= Algeria women's national football team results =

The Algerian Women's National Football Team represents Algeria in international women's football competitions. Founded during the rapid socio-economic change in North African nations, the Algerian women's football team played its first home game on July 5, 1962 at the Stadium of Algiers. As of, 2021, the Algerian women's team FIFA World Women's Rankings stood at 79th in the world. The highest ranking was at 65th, in June, 2009.

The team has been coached by Radia Fertoul since August 2018. Algeria played its first match on May 14, 1998, against France and lost 14–0.

Algerian Women National Football Team haven't yet qualified to any World Cups, although they have qualified five times to the Women's African Cup of Nations in 2004, 2006, 2010, 2014 and 2018, all finishing in the group stage.

The Algeria women's national football team is the representative women's association football team of Algeria. Its governing body is the Algerian Football Federation (AFF) and it competes as a member of the Confederation of African Football (CAF).

== Results ==
Legend

Win Draw Lose Fixture

== 1998 ==
14 May 1998 Friendly	France	14–0	Algeria	Cesson-Sévigné, France
	Diacre 3', 17' (pen.), 35'; Woock 36'; Roujas 41', 75', 83'; Lagrevol 44', 57', 70', 74'; Herbert 55'; Lattaf 67'; Pichon 70'	Report		Stadium: Stade Dézerseul; Referee: David Jouglet (France)

== 2000 ==
30 July 2000 2000 African Women's Championship qualification – 1st leg	Morocco	3–0	Algeria	El Jadida, Morocco
		Report

12 August 2000 2000 African Women's Championship qualification – 2nd leg	Algeria	1–3 (1–6 agg.)	Morocco	Algiers, Algeria
		Report
Note: Morocco won 6–1 on aggregate.

== 2003 ==
4 October 2003 2003 All-Africa Games football – Group B	DR Congo	5–2	Algeria	Kaduna, Nigeria
		Report

7 October 2003 2003 All-Africa Games football – Group B	Algeria	1–3	South Africa	Kaduna, Nigeria
	Imloul (?)	Report	Phewa (?); Jijare (?)

10 October 2003 2003 All-Africa Games football – Group B	Algeria	0–3	Mali	Kaduna, Nigeria
		Report

== 2004 ==
11 July 2004 2004 African Women's Championship qualification – First round 1st leg	Mali	2–2	Algeria	Bamako, Mali
	N'Diaye 45'; Camara 71'	Report	Zerrouki 26', 58'	Referee: Keita Aissatou (Guinea)

23 July 2004 2004 African Women's Championship qualification – First round 2nd leg	Algeria	1–0 (3–2 agg.)	Mali	Blida, Algeria
	Zerrouki 15'	Report		Stadium: Mustapha Tchaker Stadium; Referee: Fatou Gaye (Senegal)
Note: Algeria won 3–2 on aggregate.

19 September 2004 2004 African Women's Championship Group B	Nigeria	4–0	Algeria	Germiston Stadium, Germiston
	Eze 42'; Ameh 50'; Nkwocha 70'; Okolo 75'	Report

22 September 2004 2004 African Women's Championship Group B	Algeria	3–0	Mali	Germiston Stadium, Germiston
	Sedhane 10'; Imloul 11'; Laouadi 46'	Report

25 September 2004 2004 African Women's Championship Group B	Algeria	1–3	Cameroon	Germiston Stadium, Germiston
	Imloul 11'	Report	Mbida 57', 70'; Mekongo 78'

== 2006 ==
19 April 2006 2006 Arab Women's Championship Group B	Lebanon	0–12	Algeria	Alexandria Stadium, Alexandria
15:00

21 April 2006 2006 Arab Women's Championship Group B	Algeria	0–0	Morocco	Alexandria Stadium, Alexandria
15:00

26 April 2006 2006 Arab Women's Championship Semi-finals	Algeria	3–0	Tunisia	Alexandria Stadium, Alexandria
				Attendance: 14:00

29 April 2006 2006 Arab Women's Championship Final	Algeria	1–0	Morocco	Alexandria Stadium, Alexandria
16:00	Boumrar 79'

23 July 2006 2006 African Women's Championship qualification Second Round	Algeria	1–0	Egypt	Abdelkader Chabou Stadium, Annaba
	Zerrouki 55'

5 August 2006 2006 African Women's Championship qualification Second Round	Egypt	0–3	Algeria	Alexandria
			Bouhenni 44'; Imloul 54'; Laïfa 88'

October 28, 2006 2006 African Women's Championship Group A	South Africa	4–0	Algeria	Warri Township Stadium
	Phewa 1', 35'; Nompumelolo 38'; Solomon 90'

October 31, 2006 2006 African Women's Championship Group A	Algeria	0–6	Nigeria	Warri Township Stadium
			Ajayi 8'; Nkwocha 20', 90+'; Madu 35'; Ekpo 56'; Uwak 89'

3 November 2006 2006 African Women's Championship Group A	Equatorial Guinea	3–3	Algeria	Oghara Township Stadium
	Añonma 2'; Essiane 72', 78'	Report	Boumrar 35'; Bouhenni 56', 76'

== 2007 ==
6 January 2007 Friendly	Algeria	0–0	Egypt
		Report

17 February 2007 2008 Summer Olympics qualification First Round	Mozambique	0–3	Algeria
		Report	Boumrar (?); Hemour (?)

11 March 2007 2008 Summer Olympics qualification First Round	Algeria	9–1	Mozambique
	Sadou 8', 16', 41', 44'; Hemour 52', 70', 80'; Zerrouki 21', 22'	Report	Chingueleza 55'

5 May 2007 Friendly	Algeria	4–2	Tunisia
	Zerrouki 13', 30'; Boumrar 24'; Sadou 81'	Report	Hidouri 42'; Abidi 77'

8 May 2007 Friendly	Algeria	2–1	Tunisia

3 June 2007 2008 Summer Olympics qualification Second Round	Algeria	1–0	Nigeria
	Meflah 7'	Report

17 June 2007 2008 Summer Olympics qualification Second Round	Nigeria	6–0	Algeria
		Report

26 June 2007 Friendly	Tunisia	1–0	Algeria

29 June 2007 Friendly	Tunisia	0–4	Algeria

9 July 2007 2007 All-Africa Games Group B	Ghana	2–1	Algeria	Stade Ali Benfedda, Zéralda
17:30	Ankomah 17', 39'		Zerrouki 12'

12 July 2007 2007 All-Africa Games Group B	Algeria	3–1	Senegal	Stade Ali Benfedda, Zéralda
17:30	Bouhenni 9', 15'; Zerrouki 18'	Report	Fall 63'

21 July 2007 2007 All-Africa Games Semifinals	Nigeria	5–0	Algeria	Omar Hamadi Stadium, Algiers

22 July 2007 2007 All-Africa Games Third Place Match	Algeria	1–3	Ghana	Zéralda Stadium, Zéralda
	Laïfa 84'	Report	Baidoo 28'; Ankomah 59' (?)

2 December 2007 2008 African Women's Championship qualificationFirst round	Morocco	0–1	Algeria	Stade El Abdi, El Jadida
			Zerrouki	Referee: ... (Togo)

16 December 2007 2008 African Women's Championship qualificationFirst round	Algeria	2–1	Morocco	Stade Ali Benfedda, Zéralda
	Bouhenni 44'; Benguedouche 63'		Regab 42'

== 2008 ==
24 February 2008 2008 African Women's Championship qualification - Second round 1st leg	Algeria	0–0	Tunisia	Algiers, Algeria
		Report

8 March 2008 2010 African Women's Championship qualification - Second round 2nd leg	Tunisia	2–1 (2–1 agg.)	Algeria	Béni Khalled, Tunisia
	Guedri 8' (pen.); Zouaoui 90+3'	Report	Idoughi 19'	Stadium: Stade de Béni Khalled; Referee: Houaïda Brahim Sayed (Egypt)
Note: Tunisia won 2–1 on aggregate.

== 2009 ==
23 June 2009 Friendly	Algeria	4–0	Tunisia	Six-Fours-les-Plages, France
18:00	Boumrar 23'; Zerrouki 39'; Moussaoui 65'; Imloul 86'	Report		Stadium: Stade Antoine Baptiste

2 November 2009 2009 UNAF Women's Tournament	Algeria	1–1	Egypt	Bizerte, Tunisia
15:00				Stadium: Stade 15 Octobre

6 November 2009 2009 UNAF Women's Tournament	Tunisia	1–0	Algeria	Tunis, Tunisia
15:00	Mlayeh 78'			Stadium: Stade El Menzah

== 2010 ==
22 May 2010 2010 African Women's Championship qualification - First round 1st leg	Algeria	1–1	Tunisia	Algiers, Algeria
17:00	Bouhenni 90+4'	Report	Chebbi 73' (pen.)	Referee: Incaf El Harkaoui (Morocco)

5 June 2010 2010 African Women's Championship qualification - First round 2nd leg	Tunisia	0–1 (1–2 agg.)	Algeria	Tunis, Tunisia
17:00		Report	Ouadah 65'	Stadium: Stade El Menzah; Referee: Therese Sagno (Guinea)
Note: Algeria won 2–1 on aggregate.

2 November 2010 2010 African Women's Championship - Group B	Algeria	1–2	Ghana	Daveyton, South Africa
15:30	Ouadah 4'	Report	Aduako 62', 73'	Stadium: Sinaba Stadium; Referee: Fadouma Dia (Senegal)

5 November 2010 2010 African Women's Championship - Group B	Equatorial Guinea	1–0	Algeria	Daveyton, South Africa
11:00	Chinasa 31'	Report		Stadium: Sinaba Stadium; Referee: Kankou Coulibaly (Mali)

8 November 2010 2010 African Women's Championship - Group B	Cameroon	2–1	Algeria	Thembisa, Namibia
15:30	Onguéné 50'; Ejangue 65'	Report	Bouhenni 55'	Stadium: Makhulong Stadium; Referee: Therese Sagno (Guinea)

== 2011 ==
7 September 2011 2011 All-Africa - Group A	Cameroon	3–0	Algeria	Maputo, Mozambique
	Manie 5'; Iven 45'; Beyene 84'	Report		Stadium: Estádio do Zimpeto

10 September 2011 2011 All-Africa - Group A	Mozambique	1–7	Algeria	Maputo, Mozambique
	Manie 5'	Report	Meflah 2'; Bouhenni 52', 76'; Bekhedda 60'; Marek 66', 69'; Yahi 90'	Stadium: Estádio do Zimpeto

14 September 2011 2011 All-Africa Semifinals	Ghana	3–0	Algeria	Maputo, Mozambique
	Cudjoe 17', 24'; Myles 38'	Report		Stadium: Estádio do Zimpeto

16 September 2011 2011 All-Africa 3rd Place Play-off	South Africa	0–3	Algeria	Maputo, Mozambique
		Report	Zerrouki 6'; Bouhenni 50'; Marek 71'	Stadium: Estádio do Zimpeto

== 2014 ==
14 January 2014 Friendly	Algeria	1–2	Senegal	Sidi Moussa, Algeria
15:30	Bekhedda 59'	Report		Stadium: centre technique national de Sidi Moussa

18 January 2014 Friendly	Algeria	3–0	Senegal	Algiers, Algeria
17:00	Bekhedda 15'; Bouhenni 38', 70'	Report

14 February 2014 2014 African Women's Championship qualification First round 1st leg	Algeria	2–0	Morocco	Algiers, Algeria
17:00	Bouhenni 11', 56'	Report		Stadium: Omar Hamadi Stadium; Referee: Kankou Coulibaly (Mali)

1 March 2014 2014 African Women's Championship qualification First round 2nd leg	Morocco	0–0 (0–2 agg.)	Algeria	Rabat, Morocco
18:00		Report		Stadium: Prince Moulay Abdellah Stadium; Referee: Fatou Thioune (Senegal)
Note: Algeria won 2–0 on aggregate.

30 April 2014 Friendly	Algeria	1–3	Ivory Coast	Bologhine, Algeria
	Laïfa 69'	Report	Hohoues 25'; Coulibaly 67'; Nianien 87'	Stadium: Omar Hamadi Stadium

3 May 2014 Friendly	Algeria	1–2	Ivory Coast	Sidi Moussa, Algeria
		Report		Stadium: centre technique national de Sidi Moussa

23 May 2014 2014 African Women's Championship qualification Second round 1st leg	Algeria	2–1	Tunisia	Algiers, Algeria
18:00	Laïfa 1'; Sekouane 45' (pen.)	Report	Kaabachi 20'	Stadium: Omar Hamadi Stadium; Referee: Aissatou Keita (Guinea)

8 June 2014 2014 African Women's Championship qualification Second round 2nd leg	Tunisia	2–3 (3–5 agg.)	Algeria	Bizerte, Tunisia
16:00	Kaabachi 13', 32'	Report	Bouhenni 8'; Bekhedda 44' (pen.); Sekouane 81'	Stadium: Stade 15 Octobre; Referee: Damaris Kimani (Kenya)
Note: Algeria won 5–3 on aggregate.

1 October 2014 Friendly	Namibia	2–1	Algeria	Windhoek, Namibia
		Report	Bouhenni 80'	Stadium: Sam Nujoma Stadium

4 October 2014 Friendly	Namibia	3–1	Algeria	Windhoek, Namibia
		Report	Bekhedda (??)

12 October 2014 2014 African Women's Championship - Group B	Algeria	1–0	Ghana	Windhoek, Namibia
20:00	Affak 87'	Report		Stadium: Independence Stadium; Referee: Aya Irène Ahoua (Ivory Coast)

15 October 2014 2014 African Women's Championship - Group B	Cameroon	2–0	Algeria	Windhoek, Namibia
17:00	Enganamouit 17', 61' (pen.)	Report		Stadium: Independence Stadium; Referee: Kankou Coulibaly (Mali)

18 October 2014 2014 African Women's Championship - Group B	South Africa	5–1	Algeria	Windhoek, Namibia
17:00	Dlamini 36'; Modise 41', 87'; Mollo 70'; Dlamini 82'	Report	Affak 87'	Stadium: Independence Stadium; Referee: Aisha Ssemambo (Uganda)

== 2015 ==
15 December 2015 Friendly	Algeria	1–1	Tunisia	Bologhine, Algeria
17:30	Benaissa 78'	Report	Kaabachi 4'	Stadium: Omar Hamadi Stadium

18 December 2015 Friendly	Algeria	1–3	Tunisia	Sidi Moussa, Algeria
16:00	Affak (??)	Report	Kaabachi 23'; Ben Chaaben 44'; Mchara 76'	Stadium: centre technique national de Sidi Moussa

== 2016 ==
2 February 2016 Friendly	Algeria	2–2	Mali	Baraki, Algeria
15:00	Bekhedda 21'; Guellati (??)	Report		Stadium: Baraki Stadium

5 February 2016 Friendly	Algeria	5–0	Mali	Sidi Moussa, Algeria
15:00	Bouhenni (??); Bara (??); Affak (??)	Report		Stadium: centre technique national de Sidi Moussa

6 March 2016 2016 AFWCON qualification First round 1st leg	Algeria	1–0	Ethiopia	Algiers, Algeria
16:00	Zerrouki 60'	Report		Stadium: Omar Hamadi Stadium; Attendance: 300; Referee: Aissatou Inter Keita (Guinea)

26 March 2016 2016 AFWCON qualification First round 2nd leg	Ethiopia	1–1 (1–2 agg.)	Algeria	Addis Ababa, Ethiopia
	Abera 34'	Report	Zerrouki 85'	Stadium: Addis Ababa Stadium; Referee: Zomadre Sonia Kore (Ivory Coast)
Note: Algeria won 2–1 on aggregate.

8 April 2016 2016 AFWCON qualification Second round 1st leg	Algeria	2–2	Kenya	Algiers, Algeria
	Bouhenni 28', 89'	Report	Sekouane 78' (o.g.); Adam 84'	Stadium: Omar Hamadi Stadium; Attendance: 1000; Referee: Alcidia Maria Silva dos Santos (Cape Verde)

12 April 2016 2016 AFWCON qualification Second round 2nd leg	Kenya	1–1 (3–3 (a) agg.)	Algeria	Kasarani, Kenya
	Mango 75'	Report	Bouhenni 22'	Stadium: Moi International Sports Centre; Referee: Suavis Iratunga (Burundi)
Note: 3–3 on aggregate. Kenya won on away goals.

== 2017 ==
9 February 2017 Friendly	Jordan	2–1	Algeria	Amman, Jordan
16:00		Report	Affak 17'	Stadium: Petra Stadium

12 February 2017 Friendly	Jordan	2–3	Algeria	Amman, Jordan
16:00		Report	Akli 09', 86'; Bouhenni 54'	Stadium: Petra Stadium

16 June 2017 Friendly	Jordan	0–1	Algeria	Amman, Jordan
21:00		Report	Bouhenni 05'	Stadium: Petra Stadium

19 June 2017 Friendly	Jordan	3–2	Algeria	Amman, Jordan
21:00		Report	Brahimi 18'; Benlazar 25'	Stadium: Petra Stadium

== 2018 ==
4 April 2018 2018 AFWCON qualification First round 1st leg	Senegal	2–1	Algeria	Pikine, Senegal
18:00	Diédhiou 6' (pen.); Diop 10'	Report	Benlazar 38'	Stadium: Stade Al Djigo; Referee: Vincentia Enyonam Amedome (Togo)

10 April 2018 2018 AFWCON qualification First round 2nd leg	Algeria	2–0 (3–2 agg.)	Senegal	Algiers, Algeria
17:45	Sekouane 24' (pen.); Benaichouche 90+3'	Report		Stadium: 20 August 1955 Stadium; Referee: Zomadre Sonia Kore (Ivory Coast)
Note: Algeria won 3–2 on aggregate.

6 June 2018 2018 AFWCON qualification Second round 1st leg	Algeria	3–1	Ethiopia	Algiers, Algeria
22:00	Ramdani 19'; Sidhoum 32'; Sekouane 68'	Report	Biza 16'	Stadium: 5 July Stadium; Referee: Isatou Touray (Gambia)

10 June 2018 2018 AFWCON qualification Second round 2nd leg	Ethiopia	2–3 (3–6 agg.)	Algeria	Addis Ababa, Ethiopia
18:00	Abera 63', 72'	Report	Bouhenni 18'; Sekouane 45+2'; Benlazar 53'	Stadium: Addis Ababa Stadium; Referee: Dorsaf Ganouati (Tunisia)
Note: Algeria won 6–3 on aggregate.

18 October 2018 Friendly	Morocco	3–1	Algeria	Kenitra, Morocco
	Jraïdi (??), 53'; Redouani 89'	Report	Sidhoum 10'	Stadium: Stade Municipal de Kénitra

22 October 2018 Friendly	Morocco	0–1	Algeria	Salé, Morocco
14:00		Report	Marek 62'	Stadium: Centre sportif de Maâmora

9 November 2018 Friendly	Ivory Coast	2–1	Algeria	Abidjan, Ivory Coast
		Report	Benlazar (??)

11 November 2018 Friendly	Ivory Coast	3–0	Algeria	Abidjan, Ivory Coast

17 November 2018 2018 AFWCON GS	Ghana	1–0	Algeria	Accra, Ghana
15:30	Amfobea 13'	Report		Stadium: Accra Sports Stadium; Referee: Lidya Tafesse (Ethiopia)

20 November 2018 2018 AFWCON GS	Cameroon	3–0	Algeria	Accra, Ghana
18:30	Onguéné 13'; Enganamouit 54'; Nchout 60'	Report		Stadium: Accra Sports Stadium; Referee: Fatou Thioune (Senegal)

23 November 2018 2018 AFWCON GS	Algeria	2–3	Mali	Cape Coast, Ghana
16:00	Belkacemi 37'; Merrouche 63' (pen.)	Report	F. Diarra 58', 90+4' (pen.); Diadhiou 83'	Stadium: Cape Coast Sports Stadium; Referee: Patience Madu Ndidi (Nigeria)

== 2019 ==
4 April 2019 2020 CAF Women's Olympic Qualifying - First round 1st leg	Algeria	2–0	Chad	Blida, Algeria
18:00	Belkhiter 20', 23'	Report		Stadium: Stade Mustapha Tchaker

9 April 2019 2020 CAF Women's Olympic Qualifying - First round 2nd leg	Chad	1–1 (1–3 agg.)	Algeria	N'Djamena, Chad
15:00	Larkingam 90+3' (pen.)	Report	Affak 9'	Stadium: Stade Omnisports Idriss Mahamat Ouya
Note: Algeria won 3–1 on aggregate.

28 August 2019 2020 CAF Women's Olympic Qualifying - Second round 1st leg	Algeria	0–2	Nigeria	Blida, Algeria
19:00			Ouadah 15' (o.g.); Okoronkwo 54'	Stadium: Stade Mustapha Tchaker

3 September 2019 2020 CAF Women's Olympic Qualifying - Second round 2nd leg	Nigeria	1–0 (3–0 agg.)	Algeria	Lagos, Nigeria
16:00	Oshoala 57'			Stadium: Agege Stadium
Note: Nigeria won 3–0 on aggregate.

== 2020 ==
16 February 2020 2020 UNAF Women's Tournament	Algeria	2–3	Tanzania	El Kram, Tunisia
11:00	Dellidj 22'; Affak 45'	Report	Shurua 11', 45+2'; Misua 90+3'	Stadium: El Kram Stadium

18 February 2020 2020 UNAF Women's Tournament	Mauritania	0–5	Algeria	El Kram, Tunisia
11:00		Report	Boubezari 30'; Daoui 45'; Hadjar 52'; Kacem 57'; Merrouche 70'	Stadium: El Kram Stadium

20 February 2020 2020 UNAF Women's Tournament	Tunisia	1–1	Algeria	El Kram, Tunisia
13:00	Jemai 11'	Report	Merrouche 21' (pen.)	Stadium: El Kram Stadium

22 February 2020 2020 UNAF Women's Tournament	Algeria	0–2	Morocco	El Kram, Tunisia
11:00		Report	Chebbak 50'; Jraidi 86'	Stadium: El Kram Stadium

== 2021 ==
25 August 2021 Arab Women's Cup GS Group B	Jordan	1–3	Algeria	Cairo, Egypt
21:00 UTC+2	Jbarah 45'	Report	Bouhenni 34'; Ramdani 65'; Hadjar 71'	Stadium: Police Academy Stadium; Referee: Dorsaf Ganouati (Tunisia)

28 August 2021 Arab Women's Cup GS Group B	Algeria	4–1	Palestine	Cairo, Egypt
21:00 UTC+2	Benaichouche 24', 58', 86'; Bouhenni 80'	Report (SW)	Abedrabbo 57'	Stadium: Police Academy Stadium; Referee: Shahanda Saad Al-Maghraby (Egypt)

3 September 2021 Arab Women's Cup Semi-finals	Algeria	2–2 (3–4 p)	Tunisia	Cairo, Egypt
21:00 UTC+2	Merrouche 45+1'; Bouhenni 66'		Ayadi 6'; Ellouzi 46'	Stadium: Osman Ahmed Osman Stadium, Cairo; Referee: Shahanda Saad Al-Maghraby (Egypt)
	Penalties
	Kendouci (penalty scored); Arbi Aouda (penalty scored); Ouadah (penalty scored); Hamidèche (penalty missed); Daoui (penalty missed)		(penalty scored) Ellouzi; (penalty scored) Ouni; (penalty scored) Jmaii; (penalty scored) Ayadi

20 October 2021 2022 AFWCON qualification 1st round 1st leg	Algeria	14–0	Sudan	Algiers, Algeria
18:00 UTC+1	Oum Srir 2' (o.g.); Bouhenni 6', 15', 37', 46'; Koui 11', 67'; Bouzid 17', 18'; Ould Braham 29', 30'; Belkacemi 48'; Bara 67'; Merrouche 82'	Report		Stadium: Omar Hamadi Stadium; Referee: Asma Chouchane (Tunisia)

Postponed (Note: Originally to be played on 26 October 2021 at the Al Hilal Stadium in Omdurman, the Sudan v Algeria match was postponed due to security concerns following the October 2021 Sudanese coup d'état.) 2022 AFWCON qualification 1st round 2nd leg	Sudan	cancelled	Algeria	Omdurman, Sudan
		Report		Stadium: Al Hilal Stadium; Referee: Suzana Semere (Eritrea)

25 November Friendly	Tunisia	0–1	Algeria	Ariana, Tunisia
15:00		Report	Ould Braham 38'	Stadium: Ariana stadium

28 November Friendly	Tunisia	2–4	Algeria	Ariana, Tunisia
15:00	Kaabachi 55'; Laamiri 56'		Belkacemi 38'; Koui 40'; Muller 42'; Adjabi 78'	Stadium: Ariana stadium

== 2022 ==
18 February 2022 2022 AFWCON qualification 2nd round 1st leg	South Africa	2–0	Algeria	Johannesburg
16:00 UTC+2	Magaia 40'; Kgatlana 89'	Report		Stadium: Orlando Stadium; Referee: Mercy Kayira (Malawi)

23 February 2022 2022 AFWCON qualification 2nd round 2nd leg	Algeria	1–1 (1–3 agg.)	South Africa	Algiers
18:00 UTC+1	Koui 45+2'	Report	Motlhalo 63' (pen.)	Stadium: Stade Omar Hamadi; Referee: Dorsaf Ganouati (Tunisia)
Note: South Africa won 3–1 on aggregate.

== 2023 ==
9 April 2023 International Friendly	Algeria	4–0	Tanzania	Algiers, Algeria
22:30 UTC+1	Dafeur (?); Karchouni (?); Belkhiter (?)	Report		Stadium: Nelson Mandela Stadium

11 April 2023 International Friendly	Algeria	3–0	Tanzania	Algiers, Algeria
22:30 UTC+1	Boutaleb 29'; Ben Aichouche 47'; Guellati 82' (pen.)	Report		Stadium: Centre Sidi Moussa

14 July 2023 International Friendly	Senegal	3–1	Algeria	Thiès, Senegal
16:30 UTC+0	Saw 30'; N. Ndiaye 87'; S. Diallo 90+2'	Report	Dafeur 56'	Stadium: Stade Lat-Dior; Referee: Aissata Boudy Lam (Mauritania)

18 July 2023 International Friendly	Senegal	4–0	Algeria	Thiès, Senegal
16:30 UTC+0	N. Ndiaye 15', 90+1'; Diop 34'; Fall 44'	Report		Stadium: Stade Lat-Dior

20 September 2023 2024 AwconQ 1st round 1st leg	Uganda	1–2	Algeria	Njeru, Uganda
14:00 UTC+1	Najjemba 87' (pen.)	Report	Chebel 47'; Karchouni 51'	Stadium: FUFA Technical Centre Njeru; Referee: Tatu Nuru Malogo (Tanzania)

26 September 2023 2024 AwconQ 1st round 2nd leg	Algeria	1–1 (3–2 agg.)	Uganda	Oran, Algeria
19:00 UTC+1	Bouhenni 5'	Report	Najjemba 67' (pen.)	Stadium: Miloud Hadefi Stadium; Referee: Chahenda El Maghribi (Egypt)
Note: Algeria won 3–2 on aggregate.

30 November 2023 2024 AwconQ 2nd round 1st leg	Algeria	5–1	Burundi	Algiers, Algeria
20:00 UTC+1	Boutaleb 32', 43', 67'; Boussaha 65'; Chebel 80'	Report (FAF)	Niyomwungere 29'	Stadium: Stade du 5 Juillet; Referee: Aline Guimbang A Etong (Cameroon)

4 December 2023 2024 AwconQ 2nd round 2nd leg	Burundi	0–1 (1–6 agg.)	Algeria	Algiers, Algeria
15:00 UTC+3		Report (FAF)	Boutaleb 17'	Stadium: Stade du 5 Juillet; Referee: Dominique Hanjavola (Madagascar)
Note: Algeria won 6–1 on aggregate.

== 2024 ==
24 February 2024 Friendly	Algeria	2–0	Burkina Faso	Algiers, Algeria
16:00 UTC+1	Battouri 32'; Bouhenni 62'	Report (FAF)		Stadium: Centre technique national de Sidi Moussa

27 February 2024 Friendly	Algeria	3–0	Burkina Faso	Algiers, Algeria
16:00 UTC+1	Boussaha 12'; Dafeur 58'; Guellati 64' (pen.)	Report (FAF)		Stadium: Nelson Mandela Stadium

4 April 2024 Friendly	Tunisia	2–1	Algeria	Tunis, Tunisia
15:00 UTC+1	Ayadi 60'; Hamdi 90+2'	Report (FAF)	Bouhenni 48'	Stadium: Chedly Zouiten Stadium

7 April 2024 Friendly	Tunisia	2–2	Algeria	Tunis, Tunisia
15:00 UTC+1	Ben Hadj Mahmoud 29'; Hamdi 69'	Report (FAF)	Bouhenni 20' (pen.), 44'	Stadium: Chedly Zouiten Stadium

31 May 2024 Friendly	Algeria	8–0	(Algeria) CS Constantine	Blida, Algeria
11:00 UTC+1	Bouhenni 7', 19', 39'; D'Oria 21'; Bethi 24'; Belkacemi 59'; Ayadi 88'; Zemma 90+1'	Report (FAF)		Stadium: Mustapha Tchaker Stadium

3 June 2024 Friendly	Algeria	6–0	(Algeria) CF Akbou	Blida, Algeria
11:00 UTC+1	Dafeur 35'; Bouhani 53', 65'; Boussaha 59'; Bethi 87'; Naili 90'	Report (FAF)		Stadium: Mustapha Tchaker Stadium

26 October 2024 Friendly	Nigeria	2–0	Algeria	Lagos, Nigeria
16:00 UTC+1	Ajibade 24', 45+2'	Report (FAF)		Stadium: Remo Stars Stadium

29 October 2024 Friendly	Nigeria	4–1	Algeria	Lagos, Nigeria
14:00 UTC+1	Ijamilusi 9', 18', 86'; Monday 45'	Report (FAF)	Alouache 41'	Stadium: Remo Stars Stadium

27 November 2024 Friendly	Algeria	2–1	Uganda	Blida, Algeria
16:00 UTC+1	Taleb Muller 14'; Abadou 69'	Report (FAF)	Nabirye 61'	Stadium: Mustapha Tchaker Stadium

30 November 2024 Friendly	Algeria	1–0	Uganda	Blida, Algeria
16:00 UTC+1	Karchouni 34'			Stadium: Mustapha Tchaker Stadium; Referee: Mohamed Islam Mahtouk (Algeria)

== 2025 ==
19 February 2025 2026 WAFCON qualifying	South Sudan	0–5	Algeria	Juba, South Sudan
16:00 UTC+3		Report	Taleb Muller 19'; Abadou 41', 86'; Bouhani 49'; Karchouni 56' (pen.)	Stadium: Juba Stadium; Referee: Richy Nganda Madiamba (Gabon)

25 February 2025 2026 WAFCON qualifying	Algeria	3–0 (8–0 agg.)	South Sudan	Blida, Algeria
19:00 UTC+1	Karchouni 15', 89'; Taleb Muller 53'	Report		Stadium: Mustapha Tchaker Stadium
Note: Algeria won 8–0 on aggregate.

29 June 2025 Friendly	Algeria	1–0	DR Congo	Blida, Algeria
17:00 UTC+1	Boussaha 30'	Report		Stadium: Mustapha Tchaker Stadium

1 July 2025 Friendly	Algeria	0–3	Senegal	Blida, Algeria
20:00 UTC+1			N. Ndiaye 55'; H. Diallo 67'; Casset 72'	Stadium: Mustapha Tchaker Stadium

6 July 2025 2024 WAFCON GS	Algeria	1–0	Botswana	Casablanca, Morocco
20:00 UTC+1	Karchouni 11'			Stadium: Père Jégo Stadium; Referee: Yacine Samassa (Mauritania)

10 July 2025 2024 WAFCON GS	Tunisia	0–0	Algeria	Casablanca, Morocco
17:00 UTC+1		Report		Stadium: Père Jégo Stadium; Referee: Akhona Makalima (South Africa)

13 July 2025 2024 WAFCON GS	Nigeria	0–0	Algeria	Casablanca, Morocco
20:00 UTC+1		Report		Stadium: Larbi Zaouli Stadium; Referee: Antsino Twanyanyukwa (Namibia)

19 July 2025 2024 WAFCON QF	Algeria	0–0 (a.e.t.) (2–4 p)	Ghana	Berkane, Morocco
18:00 UTC+1		Report		Stadium: Berkane Stadium, Berkane; Referee: Aline Umutoni (Rwanda)
	Penalties
	Dafeur (penalty missed); Guellati (penalty scored); Belloumou (penalty missed); Taleb Muller (penalty scored)		(penalty scored) Bonsu; (penalty scored) Boaduwaa; (penalty scored) Boye-Hlorkah; (penalty scored) Badu

23 October 2025 2026 WAFCON qualifying	Algeria	2–1	Cameroon	Oran, Algeria
19:00 UTC+1	Karchouni 23'; Dafeur 35'	Report	Nchout 90+4' (pen.)	Stadium: Miloud Hadefi Stadium; Referee: Awa Ilboudo (Burkina Faso)

28 October 2025 2026 WAFCON qualifying	Cameroon	0–1 (1–3 agg.)	Algeria	Douala, Cameroon
16:00 UTC+1		Report	Dafeur 23'	Stadium: Stade de la Réunification; Attendance: 0 (Behind closed doors); Referee: Diana Murungi (Uganda)
Note: Algeria won 3–1 on aggregate.

26 November 2025 Friendly	Algeria	2–1	Kenya	Blida, Algeria
17:00 UTC+1	Khezami 47', 90'		Jereko 15'	Stadium: Mustapha Tchaker Stadium; Referee: Dhikra Houia (Algeria)

30 November 2025 Friendly	Algeria	1–1	Kenya	Blida, Algeria
15:00 UTC+1	Belloumou 90+2'		Jereko 65'	Stadium: Mustapha Tchaker Stadium

== 2026 ==
28 February 2026 Friendly	Egypt	0–3	Algeria	Cairo, Egypt
20:45 UTC+2			Boussaha 49'; Khiri 55'; Naili 87'	Stadium: EFA Center

2 March 2026 Friendly	Egypt	2–3	Algeria	Cairo, Egypt
19:30 UTC+2	El Behery 37'; Nadda 49'		D'Oria 33'; Boutaleb 61'; Khiri 74'	Stadium: EFA Center

14 April Friendly	South Africa	1–0	Algeria	Durban, South Africa
15:00 UTC+2	Majiya 35'	Report (SAFA); Report (FAF)		Stadium: Princess Magogo Stadium; Referee: Vistoria Shangula (Namibia)

17 April Friendly	South Africa	2–0	Algeria	Durban, South Africa
15:00 UTC+2	Majiya 58'; O'Malley 86'	Report (SAFA); Report (FAF)		Stadium: King Zwelithini Stadium; Referee: Seonyatseng Tshephe (Botswana)

2026 2026 WAFCON GS	Algeria	2–0	Senegal
--:--

2026 2026 WAFCON GS	Morocco	1–0	Algeria
--:--

2026 2026 WAFCON GS	Kenya	0–2	Algeria
--:--

== See also ==
- Algeria national football team results
- List of Algeria women's international footballers
