= Egypt women's national football team results =

This article lists the results and fixtures for the Egypt women's national football team.

The Cleopatra's first activity was in 1993, when they played a Unofficial Friendly against Russia in which they lost 17 to nil. After some development, the Cleopatra's made their official debut in the 1998 African Women's Championship after beating Uganda in the qualifying round. however, They lost all 3 matches scoring only 2 goals in three matches. the team saw visible improvement as they beat Ivory Coast and Kenya. Egypt is currently ranked 93rd in the FIFA Women's World Rankings. Since its return to the international stage the Egyptian team played several Friendlies three out of four were against Jordan.

== Record per opponent ==
Key

Positive balance (more wins than losses)
Neutral balance (as many wins as losses)
Negative balance (more losses than wins)

The following table shows Bahrain' all-time official international record per opponent:

Opponent	Pld	W	D	L	GF	GA	GD	W%	Confederation
Algeria	5	1	2	2	2	5	-3	20.00	CAF
Cameroon	1	0	0	1	0	2	-2	00.00	CAF
DR Congo	1	0	0	1	1	4	-3	00.00	CAF
Ethiopia	2	1	0	1	4	6	-2	50.00	CAF
Ghana	2	0	1	1	1	4	-3	00.00	CAF
India	1	0	0	1	0	1	-1	00.00	AFC
Iraq	1	1	0	0	15	0	+15	100.00	AFC
Ivory Coast	2	1	0	1	2	2	0	50.00	CAF
Jordan	10	4	2	4	8	10	-2	40.00	AFC
Kenya	2	1	0	1	1	1	0	50.00	CAF
Lebanon	2	2	0	0	9	1	+8	100.00	AFC
Libya	2	2	0	0	12	0	+12	100.00	CAF
Morocco	5	0	0	5	4	18	-14	00.00	CAF
Nigeria	1	0	0	1	0	6	-6	00.00	CAF
Palestine	2	2	0	0	13	0	+13	100.00	AFC
Réunion	2	0	1	1	4	5	-1	00.00	CAF
Senegal	2	1	1	0	2	1	+1	50.00	AFC
South Africa	2	0	0	2	1	8	-7	00.00	CAF
Sudan	1	1	0	0	10	0	+10	100.00	AFC
Syria	1	1	0	0	6	0	+6	100.00	AFC
Tunisia	10	2	2	6	12	25	-13	16.67	CAF
Uganda	4	3	1	0	7	2	+5	75.00	CAF
Zambia	2	0	0	2	0	2	-2	00.00	CAF
Zimbabwe	5	2	1	2	8	8	0	40.00	CAF
Total	68	25	11	32	122	111	+11	36.76	—

Last updated: Egypt vs Jordan, 10 October 2022.

== Results ==
=== 1998 ===
29 March 1998 1998 African Women's Championship Qualification 1st leg	Egypt	1–1	Uganda	Cairo, Egypt
--:-- UTC+2

10 April 1998 1998 African Women's Championship Qualification 2nd leg	Uganda	0–1 (1–2 agg.)	Egypt	Kampala, Uganda
--:-- UTC+2				Stadium: Nakivubo Stadium
Note: Egypt won 2–1 on aggregate.''

17 October 1998 1998 African Women's Championship Group A	DR Congo	4–1	Egypt	Kaduna, Nigeria
--:-- UTC+1				Stadium: Ahmadu Bello Stadium

20 October 1998 1998 African Women's Championship Group A	Morocco	4–1	Egypt	Kaduna, Nigeria
--:-- UTC+1				Stadium: Ahmadu Bello Stadium

23 October 1998 1998 African Women's Championship Group A	Nigeria	6–0	Egypt	Kaduna, Nigeria
--:-- UTC+1				Stadium: Ahmadu Bello Stadium

=== 2000 ===
30 July 2000 2000 African Championship qualification Final Round 1st leg	Réunion	4–3	Egypt	Saint-Paul, Réunion
--:-- UTC+2

11 August 2000 2000 African Championship qualification Final Round 2nd leg	Egypt	1–1 (4–5 agg.)	Réunion	Alexandria, Egypt
--:-- UTC+2				Stadium: Alexandria Stadium
Note: Réunion won 5–4 on aggregate.''

=== 2005 ===
25 April 2005 Friendly	Egypt	1–0	Algeria	Alexandria, Egypt
--:-- UTC+2				Stadium: Alexandria Stadium

=== 2006 ===
5 January 2006 Friendly	Egypt	0–0	Algeria	Alexandria, Egypt
--:-- UTC+2				Stadium: Alexandria Stadium

20 April 2006 2006 Arab Women's Championship Group A	Egypt	2–1	Tunisia	Alexandria, Egypt
17:00 UTC+2	Abdulmalek 54'; Rashad 79' (pen.)		Hadhraoui 6'	Stadium: Alexandria Stadium

22 April 2006 2006 Arab Women's Championship Group A	Syria	0–6	Egypt	Alexandria, Egypt
17:00 UTC+2			Abdulmalek 7', 50'; Abdel-Halim 23', 48'; Rashad 39'; Abdullatif 90+2'	Stadium: Alexandria Stadium

24 April 2006 2006 Arab Women's Championship Group A	Egypt	9–0	Palestine	Alexandria, Egypt
16:30 UTC+2				Stadium: Alexandria Stadium

26 April 2006 2006 Arab Women's Championship Semi-finals	Egypt	2–4 (a.e.t.)	Morocco	Alexandria, Egypt
17:00 UTC+2				Stadium: Alexandria Stadium

29 April 2006 2006 Arab Women's Championship 3rd place	Egypt	1–2	Tunisia	Alexandria, Egypt
13:00 UTC+2	Rashad 79'		Abidi ?', ?'	Stadium: Alexandria Stadium

23 July 2006 2006 African Championship qualification Second round 1st leg	Algeria	1–0	Egypt	Annaba, Algeria
--:-- UTC+1	Zerrouki 55'	Report		Stadium: Abdelkader Chabou Stadium

5 August 2006 2006 African Championship qualification Second round 2nd leg	Egypt	0–3 (0–4 agg.)	Algeria	Alexandria, Egypt
--:-- UTC+2		Report	Bouhenni 44'; Imloul 54'; Laïfa 88'	Stadium: Alexandria Stadium
Note: Algeria won 4–0 on aggregate.''

=== 2009 ===
2 November 2009 2009 UNAF Women's Tournament	Algeria	1–1	Egypt	Bizerte, Tunisia
15:00 UTC+1				Stadium: Stade 15 Octobre

6 November 2009 2009 UNAF Women's Tournament	Tunisia	6–2	Egypt	Tunis, Tunisia
15:00 UTC+1	Mlayeh 5', 72'; Chebbi 11' (pen.); Hannachi 31'; Mamay 80'; Abidi 85'		Abdallah 36'; Mansour 83' (pen.)	Stadium: Stade El Menzah

=== 2010 ===
19 October 2010 2010 Arabia Women's Cup Group B	Egypt	5–1	Lebanon	Manama, Bahrain
	Ebrahim ?', ?'; Unknown ?'; Unknown ?'; Unknown ?'		Bakri ?'	Stadium: Al Ahli Stadium

21 October 2010 2010 Arabia Women's Cup Group B	Egypt	15–0	Iraq	Manama, Bahrain
				Stadium: Al Ahli Stadium

23 October 2010 2010 Arabia Women's Cup Group B	Egypt	1–0	Jordan	Manama, Bahrain
				Stadium: Al Ahli Stadium

25 October 2010 2010 Arabia Women's Cup Semi finals	Egypt	4–0	Palestine	Riffa, Bahrain
	Eid 1'; Fekry 13'; Hidar 30'; Mortada 90'			Stadium: National Stadium

28 October 2010 2010 Arabia Women's Cup Final	Jordan	1–0	Egypt	Riffa, Bahrain
	Mazen 81'			Stadium: National Stadium; Attendance: 1000

=== 2011 ===
4 January 2011 Friendly	Egypt	1–2	Morocco	Cairo, Egypt
--:-- UTC+2

24 September 2011 Friendly	Egypt	0–0	Jordan	Cairo, Egypt
--:-- UTC+2

26 September 2011 Friendly	Egypt	2–1	Jordan	Cairo, Egypt
--:-- UTC+2

21 November 2011 2011 Arab Invitational Cup	Egypt	2–2	Zimbabwe	Sheikh Zayed City, Egypt
--:-- UTC+2

25 November 2011 2011 Arab Invitational Cup	Egypt	1–0	Tunisia	Sheikh Zayed City, Egypt
--:-- UTC+2

16 December 2011 Friendly	Egypt	4–1	Uganda	Cairo, Egypt
--:-- UTC+2

19 December 2011 Friendly	Egypt	1–0	Uganda	Cairo, Egypt
--:-- UTC+2

=== 2012 ===
14 January 2012 2012 African Championship qualification Preliminary round 1st leg	Egypt	4–2	Ethiopia	Cairo, Egypt
14:00 UTC+2	Atia 9', 62' (pen.); Tarek 67'; Abd El Hafiz 84'	Report	Biza ?'; Abaa 90'

29 January 2012 2012 African Championship qualification Preliminary round 2nd leg	Ethiopia	4–0 (6–4 agg.)	Egypt	Addis Ababa, Ethiopia
--:-- UTC+2	Zergaw 36', 53'; Siefu 70'; Gebrekirstos 85'	Report
Note: Ethiopia won 6–4 on aggregate.''

=== 2014 ===
22 January 2014 Friendly	Egypt	3–2	Zimbabwe	6th of October, Egypt
15:00 UTC+2		Report		Stadium: 6th of October Stadium

25 January 2014 Friendly	Egypt	1–2	Zimbabwe	6th of October, Egypt
15:00 UTC+2		Report		Stadium: 6th of October Stadium

16 February 2014 2014 African Championship qualification First round 1st leg	Egypt	0–3	Tunisia	6th of October, Egypt
15:30 UTC+2		Report	Hidouri 23'; Gomri 45'; Maknoun 50'	Stadium: 6th of October Stadium; Referee: Alla Ali Abdelssmad (Sudan)

26 October 2021 2014 African Championship qualification First round 2nd leg	Tunisia	2–2 (5–2 agg.)	Egypt	Bizerte, Tunisia
15:00 UTC+1	Houij 4' (pen.); Hidouri 61'	Report	Tarek 18'; Abdallah 77'	Stadium: Stade 15 Octobre; Referee: (Uganda)
Note: Tunisia won 5–2 on aggregate.''

27 August 2014 Friendly	Egypt	2–0	Jordan	Alexandria, Egypt
14:00 UTC+2		Report		Stadium: Alexandria Stadium

31 August 2014 Friendly	Egypt	0–2	Jordan	Alexandria, Egypt
14:00 UTC+2		Report		Stadium: Alexandria Stadium

=== 2015 ===
1 March 2015 Friendly	Kenya	0–1	Egypt	Machakos, Kenya
--:-- UTC+2		Report	Mansour 16'	Stadium: Kenyatta Stadium

21 March 2015 2015 African Games – qualification Second round 1st leg	Egypt	0–0	Senegal	Cairo, Egypt
15:30 UTC+2		Report		Stadium: Petro Sport Stadium; Referee: Zomadre Sonia Kore (Ivory Coast)

11 April 2015 2015 African Games – qualification Second round 2nd leg	Senegal	1–2 (1–2 agg.)	Egypt	M'Bour, Senegal
16:30 UTC+0	Diakhate 60'	Report	Nasser 37'; Tarik 76'	Stadium: Stade Caroline Faye; Referee: Aissata Ameyo Amegee (Togo)
Note: Egypt won 2–1 on aggregate.''

12 May 2015 Friendly	Tunisia	2–0	Egypt	Tunis, Tunisia
16:30 UTC+1		Report		Stadium: Stade Chedly Zouiten

23 May 2015 2015 Olympic Qualifying Tournament Second round 1st leg	Egypt	1–1	Ghana	Cairo, Egypt
17:30 UTC+2	Ahmed 90' (pen.)	Report	Boakye 26'	Stadium: Petro Sport Stadium

31 May 2015 2015 Olympic Qualifying Tournament Second round 2nd leg	Ghana	3–0 (4–1 agg.)	Egypt	Accra, Ghana
15:00 UTC+0	Boakye 53'; Ayieyam 85'; Addo 88'	Report		Stadium: Accra Sports Stadium
Note: Ghana won 4–1 on aggregate.''

25 November 2015 Friendly	Morocco	3–0	Egypt	Salé, Morocco
--:-- UTC+0				Stadium: Centre Sportif de Maâmora

28 November 2015 Friendly	Morocco	5–0	Egypt	Salé, Morocco
--:-- UTC+0				Stadium: Centre Sportif de Maâmora

=== 2016 ===
6 March 2016 2016 AFWCON qualification First round 1st leg	Libya	0–8	Egypt	Sousse, Tunisia
14:00 UTC+1		Report	Shoukry 4', 9', 12', 54'; Ali 28'; Engy 32' (pen.); Gazy 69'; Fayza 86' (pen.)	Stadium: Stade Olympique de Sousse; Referee: Lilia Abdeljawad (Tunisia)

20 March 2016 2016 AFWCON qualification First round 2nd leg	Egypt	4–0 (12–0 agg.)	Libya	Cairo, Egypt
13:00 UTC+2	Tarek 4'; Mohammed 25'; Engy 36'; Shoukry 82'	Report		Stadium: 30 June Stadium; Referee: Angelique Tuyishime (Rwanda)
Note: Egypt won 12–0 on aggregate.''

7 April 2016 2016 AFWCON qualification Second round 1st leg	Egypt	1–0	Ivory Coast	Cairo, Egypt
16:00 UTC+1	Samir 45'	Report		Stadium: 30 June Stadium; Referee: Aissata Ameyo Amegee (Togo)

11 April 2016 2016 AFWCON qualification Second round 2nd leg	Ivory Coast	2–1 (2–2 agg.)	Egypt	Abidjan, Ivory Coast
17:30 UTC+0	Elloh 38'; Nrehy 43'	Report	Gamal 86'	Stadium: Stade Robert Champroux; Referee: Jonesia Rukyaa Kabakama (Tanzania)
Note: 2–2 on aggregate. Egypt won on away goals rule.

20 September 2016 Friendly	Zimbabwe	2–1	Egypt	Harare, Zimbabwe
15:00 UTC+2	Mafuruse ?'; Masango ?'	Report	Shoukry ?'	Stadium: Rufaro Stadium

23 September 2016 Friendly	Zambia	1–0	Egypt	Lusaka, Zambia
15:00 UTC+2	Sosala 43'	Report		Stadium: Sunset Stadium

25 September 2016 Friendly	Zambia	1–0	Egypt	Lusaka, Zambia
16:00 UTC+2				Stadium: Sunset Stadium

22 October 2016 Friendly	South Africa	3–1	Egypt	Tembisa, South Africa
--:-- UTC+1	Makhabane ?'; Jane ?'; Nogwanya ?'	Report	Tarek ?'	Stadium: Dobsonville Stadium

28 October 2016 Friendly	Kenya	1–0	Egypt	Nairobi, Kenya
12:30 UTC+2	Corazone ?'	Report		Stadium: Moi International Sports Centre

19 November 2016 2016 Women's Africa Cup of Nations Group A	Cameroon	2–0	Egypt	Yaoundé, Cameroon
15:30 UTC+1	Onguéné 25'; Manie 72' (pen.)	Report		Stadium: Ahmadou Ahidjo Stadium; Referee: Lidya Tafesse (Ethiopia)

22 November 2016 2016 Women's Africa Cup of Nations Group A	Zimbabwe	0–1	Egypt	Yaoundé, Cameroon
19:00 UTC+1		Report	Tarik 83'	Stadium: Ahmadou Ahidjo Stadium; Referee: Suavis Iratunga (Burundi)

25 November 2016 2016 Women's Africa Cup of Nations Group A	Egypt	0–5	South Africa	Limbe, Cameroon
16:00 UTC+1		Report	Mgcoyi 27'; Vilakazi 60'; Jane 61'; Seoposenwe 66'; Motlhalo 84'	Stadium: Stade Municipal de Limbe; Referee: Salma Mukansanga (Rwanda)

=== 2021 ===
24 August 2022 2021 Arab Women's Cup Group A	Egypt	10–0	Sudan	Cairo, Egypt
17:00 UTC+2	Gomaa ?'; Ghazi ?', ?', ?', ?'; Tarek ?'; Salem ?'; El Zayat ?'; Adam ?'; Elmitwalli ?'	Report		Stadium: Police Academy Stadium; Referee: Doumouh Al Bakkar (Lebanon)

27 August 2022 2021 Arab Women's Cup Group A	Lebanon	0–4	Egypt	Cairo, Egypt
21:00 UTC+2		Report	Elmitwalli 20'; Nadda 40'; Abu Al Joud 66'; Ghazi 84'	Stadium: Police Academy Stadium; Referee: Lamia Athman (Algeria)

30 August 2022 2021 Arab Women's Cup Group A	Egypt	2–2	Tunisia	Cairo, Egypt
17:00 UTC+2	Ghazi 44', 53'	Report	Jeddi 48'; Ellouzi 73'	Stadium: Osman Ahmed Osman Stadium; Referee: Bouchra Karboubi (Morocco)

3 September 2022 2021 Arab Women's Cup Semi-finals	Egypt	2–5	Jordan	Cairo, Egypt
17:00 UTC+2	Essam 42'; El-Metwally 67'	Report	Jbarah 37', 46'; Jebreen 38'; Fraij 45+4', 78'	Stadium: Osman Ahmed Osman Stadium; Referee: Dorsaf Ganouati (Tunisia)

20 October 2021 2022 AFWCON qualification First round 1st leg	Egypt	2–6	Tunisia	Cairo, Egypt
		Report		Stadium: Petro Sport Stadium

26 October 2021 2022 AFWCON qualification First round 2nd leg	Tunisia	1–0 (7–2 agg.)	Egypt	Tunis, Tunisia
	Houij 90+1' (pen.)	Report		Stadium: Stade El Menzah
Note: Tunisia won 7–2 on aggregate.''

=== 2022 ===
5 April 2022 Friendly	India	1–0	Egypt	Zarqa, Jordan
22:00 UTC+3	Priyangka 32'	Report		Stadium: Prince Mohammed Stadium; Attendance: 100; Referee: Haneen Murad (Jordan)

11 April 2022 Friendly	Jordan	0–0	Egypt	Zarqa, Jordan
22:30 UTC+3		Report		Stadium: Prince Mohammed Stadium; Attendance: 200; Referee: Saddam Amarah (Jordan)

6 October 2022 Friendly	Egypt	1–0	Jordan	Cairo, Egypt
18:00 UTC+2	El Danbouki 14'	Report		Stadium: Police Academy Stadium

9 October 2022 Friendly	Egypt	0–1	Jordan	Cairo, Egypt
18:00 UTC+2		Report	Sweilem 89'	Stadium: Police Academy Stadium

=== 2023 ===
19 February 2023 Friendly	Lebanon	1–2	Egypt	Jounieh, Lebanon
11:00 UTC+2	Salha 15'	Report	Ismael 53'; Essam 56'	Stadium: Fouad Chehab Stadium; Referee: Doumouh Al Bakkar (Lebanon)

22 February 2023 Friendly	Lebanon	1–2	Egypt	Jounieh, Lebanon
15:00 UTC+3	Iskandar 55'	Report	Ismael 42'; Maustafa 88'	Stadium: Fouad Chehab Stadium; Referee: Doumouh Al Bakkar (Lebanon)

20 September 2023 2024 AFWCON qualification First round 1st leg	Egypt	4–0	South Sudan	Cairo, Egypt
18:00 UTC+3	S. Adam 4'; H. Maustafa 27'; O. Samir 38'; S. Essam 57'	Report (EFA)		Stadium: Petrosport Stadium; Referee: Dorsaf Ganouati (Tunisia)

24 September 2023 2024 AFWCON qualification First round 2nd leg	South Sudan	0–4 (0–8 agg.)	Egypt	Cairo, Egypt
18:00 UTC+3		Report (EFA)	S. Adam 17'; H. Maustafa 21'; S. Essam 33', 72'	Stadium: Al Salam Stadium
Note: Egypt won 8–0 on aggregate.

30 November 2023 2024 AFWCON qualification Second round 1st leg	Senegal	4–0	Egypt	Thiès, Senegal
17:00 UTC+0	Babou 26'; Ndiaye 30'; H. Diallo 68'; Sow 88'	Report (FSF)		Stadium: Stade Lat-Dior

5 December 2023 2024 AFWCON qualification Second round 2nd leg	Egypt	0-0 (0-4 agg.)	Senegal	Cairo, Egypt
--:-- UTC+3				Stadium: Al Salam Stadium

== See also ==
- Egypt national football team results
