= 2020 UNAF Women's Tournament squads =

2020 UNAF Women's Tournament

Below is a list of squads used in the 2020 UNAF Women's Tournament.

== Algeria ==
Head coach:

No.	Pos.	Player	Date of birth (age)	Caps	Goals	Club
	GK	Lamia Lounia		0	0	(Algerian Football Federation) ASE Alger Centre
	GK	Assia Rabhi	25 October 2000 (aged 19)	0	0	(Algerian Football Federation) CF Akbou
	GK	Kahina Takenint	21 May 1991 (aged 28)	0	0	(Algerian Football Federation) AS Sûreté Nationale
	DF	Wassila Alouache	11 July 2000 (aged 19)	0	0	(Algerian Football Federation) JF Khroub
	DF	Kelthoum Arbi Aouda	25 September 1987 (aged 32)	0	0	(Algerian Football Federation) Afak Relizane
	DF	Fouzia Bakli		0	0	(Algerian Football Federation) ESF Amizour
	DF	Chahrazed Bensekrane	7 April 1992 (aged 27)	0	0	(Algerian Football Federation) AS Sûreté Nationale
	DF	Anissa Dellidj	6 April 1993 (aged 26)	0	0	(French Football Federation) Grand Calais Pascal FC
	DF	Fatma Kharbache		0	0	(Algerian Football Federation) AS Sûreté Nationale
	DF	Isma Ouadah	19 January 1983 (aged 37)	0	0	(Algerian Football Federation) AS Sûreté Nationale
	MF	Hanna Boubezar	21 November 1998 (aged 21)	0	0	(Swedish Football Association) Lidköpings FK
	MF	Mounia Houhèche	5 November 1992 (aged 27)	0	0	(Algerian Football Federation) AS Sûreté Nationale
	MF	Zineb Kendouci	16 March 1994 (aged 25)	0	0	(Algerian Football Federation) Afak Relizane
	FW	Houria Affak	11 July 1988 (aged 31)	0	0	(Algerian Football Federation) Afak Relizane
	FW	Rahma Benaichouche		0	0	(Algerian Football Federation) AS Sûreté Nationale
	FW	Ferial Daoui	15 December 1999 (aged 20)	0	0	(Algerian Football Federation) FC Constantine
	FW	Kenza Hadjar	24 December 1992 (aged 27)	0	0	(Algerian Football Federation) AS Sûreté Nationale
	FW	Imene Merrouche	25 April 1994 (aged 25)	0	0	(Algerian Football Federation) FC Constantine
		Nassima Bekhti		0	0	(French Football Federation) FF Issy
		Djamila Benaïssa		0	0	(Algerian Football Federation) CF Akbou
		Yasmine Benbenai		0	0	(Algerian Football Federation) USF Béjaïa
		Aya Nour El-Houda Slim		0	0	(Algerian Football Federation) CF Akbou
		Aïda Fetni		0	0	(Algerian Football Federation) AR Guelma
		Soulef Gacem		0	0	(Algerian Football Federation) FC Constantine
		Melissa Molli		0	0	(Algerian Football Federation) FC Béjaïa
		Safia Smaïl		0	0	(Algerian Football Federation) FC Constantine
