= 2008 African Women's Championship qualification =

Tournament details
- Dates: 30 November 2007 – 8 March 2008
- Teams: 22 (from 1 confederation)

Tournament statistics
- Matches played: 24
- Goals scored: 86 (3.58 per match)

The 2008 African Women's Championship qualification process was organized by the Confederation of African Football (CAF) to decide the participating teams of the 2008 African Women's Championship. Equatorial Guinea qualified automatically as hosts, while the remaining seven spots were determined by qualifying rounds, which took place from November 2007 to March 2008.

== Teams ==
A total of 22 national teams entered qualification. The qualification was in two rounds, with each match taking place over 2 legs. In the first round, the 16 lowest-ranked nations were drawn in pairs. The eight winners joined six other national teams in the 2nd round, where the seven winners together with the hosts qualified for the finals.

Teams who withdrew before playing a match are in italics.

Round	Teams entering round	No. of teams
First round	Algeria; Benin; Botswana; Burundi; Congo; Egypt; Eritrea; Guinea; Ivory Coast; Morocco; Namibia; Senegal; Tanzania; Tunisia; Zambia; Zimbabwe	16
Second round	Cameroon; DR Congo; Ghana; Mali; Nigeria; South Africa	6
Qualifying rounds	Total	22
Final tournament	Equatorial Guinea	1

== Format ==
Qualification ties were played on a home-and-away two-legged basis. If the aggregate score was tied after the second leg, the away goals rule would be applied, and if still level, the penalty shoot-out would be used to determine the winner (no extra time would be played).

The seven winners of the final round qualified for the final tournament.

== Schedule ==
The schedule of the qualifying rounds was as follows.

Round	Leg	Date
First round	First leg	30 November 2007
First round	Second leg	16 December 2007
Second round	First leg	24 February 2008
Second round	Second leg	8 March 2008

== First round ==
Was played between 30 November and 16 December 2007. Cameroon, Congo-Kinshasa, Ghana, Mali, Nigeria and South Africa had a bye to the second round.

=== Overview ===
Team 1	Agg.	Team 2	1st leg	2nd leg
Morocco	1–3	Algeria	0–1	1–2
Zimbabwe	6–3	Zambia	3–1	3–2
Eritrea	2–4	Tanzania	2–3	0–1
Botswana	1–9	Namibia	0–3	1–6
Senegal	1–3	Ivory Coast	1–1	0–2
Tunisia	w/o	Egypt	—	—
Burundi	w/o	Congo	—	—
Guinea	w/o	Benin	—	—

Egypt, Burundi and Benin withdrew their matches.

=== Matches ===
2 December 2007

Morocco	0–1	Algeria
	Report	Zerrouki

Stade El Abdi, El Jadida
Referee: ... (Togo)
16 December 2007

Algeria	2–1	Morocco
Bouhani 44'; Benguedouche 63'	Report	Regab 42'

Stade Ali Benfedda, Zéralda

Algeria won 3–1 on aggregate.

30 November 2007

Tunisia	Cancelled	Egypt

16 December 2007

Egypt	Cancelled	Tunisia

Tunisia advanced on walkover after Egypt withdrew.

== Second round ==
Played between 24 February and 8 March 2008.

=== Overview ===
Team 1	Agg.	Team 2	1st leg	2nd leg
Algeria	1–2	Tunisia	0–0	1–2
Congo	5–2	DR Congo	4–1	1–1
Zimbabwe	1–6	South Africa	1–4	0–2
Tanzania	1–5	Cameroon	0–3	1–2
Namibia	1–13	Nigeria	0–3	1–10
Guinea	0–11	Mali	0–8	0–3
Ivory Coast	1–4	Ghana	1–1	0–3

=== Matches ===
24 February 2008

Algeria	0–0	Tunisia
	Report

Zéralda Stadium, Zeralda
Referee: Fadouma Dia (Senegal)
7 March 2008

Tunisia	2–1	Algeria
Guedri 8' (pen.); Zouaoui 90+3'	Report	Idoughi 19'

Stade de Béni Khalled, Béni Khalled
Referee: Houaïda Brahim Sayed (Egypt)

24 February 2008

Congo	4–1	DR Congo
Kokolo 3' (pen.), 50' (pen.); Ndoulou 9'; Mabonzo 86'	Report	Zuma 42'

Stade Alphonse Massemba-Débat, Brazzaville
8 March 2008

DR Congo	1–1	Congo
Bonga 61'	Report	Mvintsie 20'

Stade des Martyrs, Kinshasa
Referee: Rafiatou Sitou (Benin)

23 February 2008

Zimbabwe	1–4	South Africa
Ndlovu 41'	Report	Makhabane 50'; Nyandeni 51'; Matlou 66', 90+1'

Harare
8 March 2008

South Africa	2–0	Zimbabwe
Kubheka 55'; Ngwane 75'	Report

Tswane

23 February 2008

Tanzania	0–3	Cameroon
	Report	Ngono Mani 32', 61'; Bouma 68'

Dar es Salaam
8 March 2008

Cameroon	2–1	Tanzania
Onguéné 29'; Bekombo 41'	Report	Charati 18'

Ahmadou Ahidjo Stadium, Yaoundé
Referee: Aïssata Amégée (Togo)

22 February 2008

Namibia	0–3	Nigeria
	Report	Chikwelu 55'; Chiejine 58'; Ekpo 65'

Windhoek
8 March 2008

Nigeria	10–1	Namibia
Ekpo 12'; Nkwocha 14', 30', 7-0'; Chikwelu 20', 6-0'; Uwak 46', 10-0'; Chiejine 8-0'; Ajayi 9-0'	Report	Lucas 8-1'

Abuja National Stadium, Abuja
Attendance: 4,000

24 February 2008

Guinea	0–8	Mali
	Report	Samake 20', 54'; N'Diaye 28', 66'; Diabaté 45'; Touré 68', 70'; Diarra 76'

Stade du 28 Septembre, Conakry
8 March 2008

Mali	3–0	Guinea
Diarra 26'; Coulibaly 65'; Touré 79'	Report

Stade Modibo Kéïta, Bamako
Referee: Slidja Moula (Algeria)

23 February 2008

Ivory Coast	1–1	Ghana
Essoh 82'	Report	Oforiwaa 10'

Robert Champroux Stadium, Abidjan
Referee: Thérèse Sagno (Guinea)
8 March 2008
15:00 UTC+0

Ghana	3–0	Ivory Coast
Saabi 23'; Amankwa 60'; Okoe 85'	Report

Ohene Djan Stadium, Accra

== Qualified teams ==
The following teams qualified for the final tournament.

Team	Qualified as	Qualified on	Previous appearances in tournament^{1}
Equatorial Guinea	Hosts		1 (2006)
Cameroon	Winners against Tanzania	8 March 2008	6 (1991, 1998, 2000, 2002, 2004, 2006)
Congo	Winners against DR Congo	8 March 2008	Debut
Ghana	Winners against Ivory Coast	8 March 2008	7 (1991, 1995, 1998, 2000, 2002, 2004, 2006)
Mali	Winners against Guinea	8 March 2008	3 (2002, 2004, 2006)
Nigeria	Winners against Namibia	8 March 2008	7 (**1991**, **1995**, **1998**, **2000**, **2002**, **2004**, **2006**)
South Africa	Winners against Zimbabwe	8 March 2008	6 (1995, 1998, 2000, 2002, 2004, 2006)
Tunisia	Winners against Algeria	8 March 2008	Debut

^{1} Bold indicates champions for that year. Italic indicates hosts for that year.
