= 2021 Arab Women's Cup =

كأس العرب للسيدات 2021

Tournament details
- Host country: Egypt
- Dates: 24 August – 6 September
- Teams: 7 (from 2 confederations)
- Venues: 3 (in 1 host city)

Final positions
- Champions: Jordan (1st title)
- Runners-up: Tunisia

Tournament statistics
- Matches played: 12
- Goals scored: 63 (5.25 per match)
- Top scorer(s): (Egypt) Nadine Ghazi (7 goals)

The 2021 Arab Women's Cup (Arabic: كأس العرب للسيدات 2021) was the second edition of the Arab Women's Cup for national women's football teams affiliated with the Union of Arab Football Associations (UAFA). The tournament was hosted by Egypt between 24 August and 6 September 2021.

Hosts Egypt lost to eventual winners Jordan in the semi-finals. Jordan beat Tunisia 1–0 in the final.

== Participating teams ==
Country	Confederation	Previous appearances in tournament
Algeria	CAF	1 (**2006**)
Egypt (hosts)	CAF	1 (2006)
Jordan	AFC	0 (debut)
Lebanon	AFC	1 (2006)
Palestine	AFC	1 (2006)
Sudan	CAF	0 (debut)
Tunisia	CAF	1 (2006)

Bold indicates champion for that year. Italic indicates the hosts country.

=== Did not enter ===
- Bahrain
- Comoros
- Djibouti
- Iraq
- Kuwait
- Libya
- Mauritania
- Morocco
- Oman
- Qatar
- Saudi Arabia
- Somalia
- Syria
- United Arab Emirates
- Yemen

== Venues ==
2021 Arab Women's Cup is located in Egypt	Cairo		
2021 Arab Women's Cup is located in Egypt	Osman Ahmed Osman Stadium	Police Academy Stadium	Air Defense Stadium
2021 Arab Women's Cup is located in Egypt	Capacity: **35,000**	Capacity: **12,000**	Capacity: **1,000**

Due to the COVID-19 pandemic in Egypt, all the matches were played behind closed doors without any spectators.

== Match officials ==
**Referees**

- Lamia Athman (Algeria)
- Shahanda Saad Al-Maghraby (Egypt)
- Haneen Murad (Jordan)
- Doumouh Al Bakkar (Lebanon)
- Bouchra Karboubi (Morocco)
- Dorsaf Ganouati (Tunisia)
- (United Arab Emirates) Khuloud Al-Zaabi (United Arab Emirates)

**Assistant Referees**

- Yara Atef (Egypt)
- Mona Atalla (Egypt)
- Sabreen Al-Abadi (Jordan)
- Perissa Nasr (Lebanon)
- Fatiha Jermouni (Morocco)
- Heba Saadieh (Palestine)
- Roba Zarka (Syria)
- Houda Afine (Tunisia)
- (United Arab Emirates) Amal Gamal Badhafari (United Arab Emirates)

== Group stage ==
Tie-breaking criteria for group play
The ranking of teams in each group was based on the following criteria:
1. Number of points obtained in games between the teams involved
2. Goal difference in games between the teams involved
3. Goals scored in games between the teams involved
4. Away goals scored in games between the teams involved
5. Goal difference in all games
6. Goals scored in all games
7. Drawing of lots

=== Group A ===
Pos	Team	Pld	W	D	L	GF	GA	GD	Pts	Qualification
1	Egypt (H)	3	2	1	0	16	2	+14	**7**	Advance to knockout stage
2	Tunisia	3	1	2	0	14	3	+11	**5**	Advance to knockout stage
3	Lebanon	3	1	1	1	5	5	0	**4**	
4	Sudan	3	0	0	3	2	27	−25	**0**	

Source: Goalzz.com
(H) Hosts
24 August 2021
17:00 UTC+2

Egypt	10–0	Sudan
Gomaa; Ghazi; Tarek; Salem; El Zayat; Adam; Elmitwalli	Report

Police Academy Stadium, Cairo
Referee: Doumouh Al Bakkar (Lebanon)
24 August 2021
21:00 UTC+2

Tunisia	0–0	Lebanon
	Report

Police Academy Stadium, Cairo
Referee: Bouchra Karboubi (Morocco)

27 August 2021
17:00 UTC+2

Sudan	1–12	Tunisia
Abdelmoneim	Report	Jeddi; Mchara; Ouni; Maknoun; Masoud; Jemaii; Aboud; Hattab

Police Academy Stadium, Cairo
Referee: Haneen Murad (Jordan)
27 August 2021
21:00 UTC+2

Lebanon	0–4	Egypt
	Report	Elmitwalli 20'; Nadda 40'; Abu Al Joud 66'; Ghazi 84'

Police Academy Stadium, Cairo
Referee: Lamia Athman (Algeria)

30 August 2021
17:00 UTC+2

Egypt	2–2	Tunisia
Ghazi 44', 53'	Report	Jeddi 48'; Ellouzi 73'

Osman Ahmed Osman Stadium, Cairo
Referee: Bouchra Karboubi (Morocco)
30 August 2021
21:00 UTC+2

Lebanon	5–1	Sudan
Al Kasti 3', 19'; Maalouf 6'; Salha 26', 44'	Report	Ragab 50'

Osman Ahmed Osman Stadium, Cairo
Referee: Khuloud Al-Zaabi (United Arab Emirates)

=== Group B ===
Pos	Team	Pld	W	D	L	GF	GA	GD	Pts	Qualification
1	Algeria	2	2	0	0	7	2	+5	**6**	Advance to knockout stage
2	Jordan	2	1	0	1	5	4	+1	**3**	Advance to knockout stage
3	Palestine	2	0	0	2	2	8	−6	**0**	

Source: Goalzz.com
25 August 2021
21:00 UTC+2

Jordan	1–3	Algeria
Jbarah 45'	Report	Bouhani 34'; Ramdani 65'; Hadjar 71'

Air Defense Stadium, Cairo
Referee: Dorsaf Ganouati (Tunisia)

28 August 2021
21:00 UTC+2

Algeria	4–1	Palestine
Benaichouche 24', 58', 86'; Bouhani 80'	Report	Abedrabbo 57'

Air Defense Stadium, Cairo
Referee: Shahanda Saad Al-Maghraby (Egypt)

31 August 2021
21:00 UTC+2

Palestine	1–4	Jordan
Abedrabbo 17'	Report	Jbarah 1', 56'; Al-Majali 45+2'; Al-Masri 46'

Air Defense Stadium, Cairo
Referee: Doumouh Al Bakkar (Lebanon)

== Knockout stage ==
- In the knockout stage, extra-time and a penalty shoot-out were used to decide the winner if necessary.

=== Bracket ===
Semi-finals
3 September—Cairo
Egypt	2
**Jordan**	**5**
3 September—Cairo
Algeria	2 (3)
**Tunisia (p)**	**2 (4)**

Final
6 September—Cairo
**Jordan**	**1**
Tunisia	0

=== Semi-finals ===
3 September 2021
17:00 UTC+2

Egypt	2–5	Jordan
Essam 42'; Elmitwalli 67'		Jbarah 37', 46'; Jebreen 38'; Fraij 45+4', 78'

Osman Ahmed Osman Stadium, Cairo
Referee: Dorsaf Ganouati (Tunisia)

3 September 2021
21:00 UTC+2

Algeria	2–2	Tunisia
Merrouche 45+1'; Bouhani 66'		Ayadi 6'; Ellouzi 46'
Penalties
Kandouci (penalty scored); Arbi Aouda (penalty scored); Ouadah (penalty scored); Hamidèche (penalty missed); Daoui (penalty missed)	3–4	(penalty scored) Ellouzi; (penalty scored) Ouni; (penalty scored) Jmaii; (penalty scored) Ayadi

Osman Ahmed Osman Stadium, Cairo
Referee: Shahanda Saad Al-Maghraby (Egypt)

=== Final ===
6 September 2021
20:00 UTC+2

Jordan	1–0	Tunisia
Jbarah 85'	Report

Osman Ahmed Osman Stadium, Cairo
Referee: Shahanda Saad Al-Maghraby (Egypt)

== Statistics ==
=== Goalscorers ===
There have been 63 goals scored in 12 matches, for an average of 5.25 goals per match.

7 goals

- (Egypt) Nadine Ghazi

6 goals

- (Jordan) Maysa Jbarah

3 goals

- (Algeria) Rahma Benaichouche
- (Algeria) Naïma Bouhani
- (Egypt) Salwa El-Mitwalli
- (Tunisia) Eya Jeddi
- (Tunisia) Imen Mchara

2 goals

- (Jordan) Rouzbahan Fraij
- (Lebanon) Dima Al Kasti
- (Lebanon) Syntia Salha
- (Palestine) Lana Abedrabbo
- (Tunisia) Sabrine Ellouzi
- (Tunisia) Leila Maknoun

1 goal

- (Algeria) Kenza Hadjar
- (Algeria) Imène Merrouche
- (Algeria) Madina Ramdani
- (Egypt) Yasmine Abu Al Joud
- (Egypt) Samia Adam
- (Egypt) Asmaa Gomaa
- (Egypt) Sara Essam Mohamed
- (Egypt) Dana Nadda
- (Egypt) Noha Sadek
- (Egypt) Manar Salem
- (Egypt) Samar El Zayat
- (Jordan) Ayah Al-Majali
- (Jordan) Luna Al-Masri
- (Jordan) Shahnaz Jebreen
- (Lebanon) Christy Maalouf
- (Sudan) Rawan Abdelmoneim
- (Sudan) Rayan Ragab
- (Tunisia) Rimel Aboud
- (Tunisia) Ghada Ayadi
- (Tunisia) Ahlem Hattab
- (Tunisia) Yassmine Jemaii
- (Tunisia) Wafa Masoud
- (Tunisia) Samia Ouni

=== Final standings ===
Per statistical convention in football, matches decided in extra time are counted as wins and losses, while matches decided by penalty shoot-outs are counted as draws.

Pos.	Team	G	Pld	W	D	L	Pts	GF	GA	GD
1	Jordan	B	4	3	0	1	9	11	6	+5
2	Tunisia	A	5	1	3	1	6	16	6	+10
**Eliminated in the semi-finals**
3	Algeria	B	3	2	1	0	7	9	4	+5
3	Egypt **(H)**	A	4	2	1	1	7	18	7	+11
**Eliminated in the group stage**
5	Lebanon	A	3	1	1	1	4	5	5	0
6	Palestine	B	2	0	0	2	0	2	8	−6
7	Sudan	A	3	0	0	3	0	2	27	−25

== Media ==
=== Broadcasting ===
From the knockout stage, the competition was covered by the Egyptian channel OnTime Sports.

Territory	Channel
Egypt	OnTime Sports

== See also ==
- 2021 FIFA Arab Cup
- 2021 Arab Cup U-20
- 2021 Arab Cup U-17
