= Football at the 2011 All-Africa Games – Women's tournament =

2011 Women's All-Africa Games football tournament
Tournament details
- Host country: Mozambique
- City: Maputo
- Dates: 3–18 September
- Teams: 8 (from 1 confederation)
- Venue: 1 (in 1 host city)

Final positions
- Champions: Cameroon (1st title)
- Runners-up: Ghana
- Third place: Algeria
- Fourth place: South Africa

Tournament statistics
- Matches played: 13
- Goals scored: 44 (3.38 per match)

The 2011 All-Africa Games football – Women's tournament was the third edition of the All-Africa games to include women's football. The football tournament was held in Maputo, Mozambique between 3 and 18 September 2011 as part of the 2011 All-Africa Games. Eight teams took part to the tournament.

The tournament was won by Cameroon, which defeated Ghana 1–0 in the gold medal game. Madeleine Ngono scored the game-winning goal in the 56th minute for Cameroon, which collected their first ever All-Africa Games gold medal.

== Qualified teams ==
Only Ghana, Zimbabwe and South Africa had played games in qualifying. Other teams advanced by default because opponents withdraw. Two time champions Nigeria lost to Ghana in the qualifying.

Zone	Qualifiers
Host	Mozambique
Zone 1	Algeria
Zone 2	Guinea
Zone 3	Ghana
Zone 4	Tanzania
Zone 5	Cameroon
Zone 6	South Africa
Zone 6	Zimbabwe

== Final tournament ==
The draw for the women's final tournament took place in Cairo, Egypt on July 12 in CAF headquarters. The eight teams were divided into two groups of four teams. The two top teams from each group played the semifinals before the final match.

Group winners and runners-up advanced to the semifinals.

All times given as local time (UTC+2)

=== Group stage ===
==== Group A ====
Team	Pld	W	D	L	GF	GA	GD	Pts
Cameroon	2	2	0	0	4	0	+4	6
Algeria	2	1	0	1	7	4	+3	3
Mozambique	2	0	0	2	1	8	−7	0
Guinea	withdrew							

- Guinea withdrew and Group A became a three-team group.
4 September 2011

Mozambique	0–1	Cameroon
	Report	Zouga 16'

Estádio do Zimpeto, Maputo

7 September 2011

Cameroon	3–0	Algeria
Manie 5'; Iven 45'; Beyene 84'	Report

Estádio do Maxaquene, Maputo

10 September 2011

Mozambique	1–7	Algeria
Mutola 42'	Report	Meflah 24'; Bouhani 52', 76'; Bekhedda 60'; Marek 66', 69'; Yahi 90'

Estádio da Machava, Maputo

==== Group B ====
Team	Pld	W	D	L	GF	GA	GD	Pts
Ghana	3	2	1	0	6	4	+2	7
South Africa	3	1	2	0	8	5	+3	5
Tanzania	3	0	2	1	5	6	−1	2
Zimbabwe	3	0	1	2	4	8	−4	1

5 September 2011

South Africa	4–1	Zimbabwe

Estádio do Zimpeto, Maputo
5 September 2011

Tanzania	1–2	Ghana

Estádio do Zimpeto, Maputo

8 September 2011

South Africa	2–2	Tanzania

Estádio do Zimpeto, Maputo
8 September 2011

Zimbabwe	1–2	Ghana

Estádio do Zimpeto, Maputo

11 September 2011

South Africa	2–2	Ghana

Estádio do Zimpeto, Maputo
11 September 2011

Tanzania	2–2	Zimbabwe

Estádio do Zimpeto, Maputo

== Knockout stage ==
Semi-finals
13 September
Cameroon	2
South Africa	0
14 September
Algeria	0
Ghana	3

Final
17 September
Cameroon	1
Ghana	0
Third place
16 September
South Africa	0
Algeria	3

=== Semifinals ===
13 September 2011

Cameroon	2–0	South Africa
Aboudi 36'; Enganamouit 62'	Report

Estádio do Maxaquene, Maputo

14 September 2011

Ghana	3–0	Algeria
Cudjoe 17', 24'; Myles 38'	Report

Estádio do Maxaquene, Maputo

=== Third-place play-off ===
16 September 2011

South Africa	0–3	Algeria
	Report	Zerrouki 6'; Bouhani 50'; Marek 71'

Estádio do Maxaquene, Maputo

=== Final ===
17 September 2011

Ghana	0–1	Cameroon
	Report	Ngono 56'

Estádio do Zimpeto, Maputo

== Final ranking ==
Pos	Team	Pld	W	D	L	GF	GA	GD	Pts	Final result
1st place, gold medalist(s)	Cameroon	4	4	0	0	7	0	+7	12	Gold Medal
2nd place, silver medalist(s)	Ghana	5	3	1	1	9	5	+4	10	Silver Medal
3rd place, bronze medalist(s)	Algeria	4	2	0	2	10	7	+3	6	Bronze Medal
4	South Africa	5	1	2	2	8	10	−2	5	Fourth place
5	Tanzania	3	0	2	1	5	6	−1	2	Eliminated in group stage
6	Mozambique (H)	2	0	0	2	1	8	−7	0	Eliminated in group stage
7	Zimbabwe	3	0	1	2	4	8	−4	1	Eliminated in group stage
8	Guinea	0	0	0	0	0	0	0	0	Withdrew

Source: todor66
(H) Hosts

== See also ==
- Football at the 2011 All-Africa Games – Men's tournament
