= Football at the 2007 All-Africa Games – Women's tournament =

2007 Women's All-Africa Games football tournament
Tournament details
- Host country: Algeria
- City: Algiers
- Dates: July 2007
- Teams: 6 (from 1 confederation)

Final positions
- Champions: Nigeria (2nd title)
- Runners-up: South Africa
- Third place: Ghana
- Fourth place: Algeria

Tournament statistics
- Matches played: 10
- Goals scored: 36 (3.6 per match)

The 2007 All-Africa Games football – Women's tournament was the 2nd edition of the African Games men's football tournament for women. The football tournament was held in Algiers, Algeria in July 2007 as part of the 2007 All-Africa Games. Six teams took part. The final was a repeat of the first one four years ago. Nigeria again beat South Africa.

== Qualification ==
Algeria (hosts), Nigeria and Ghana qualified automatically. Cameroon and Mozambique withdrew. Teams that qualified for the tournament were:

Zone	Team
Zone I	Algeria (hosts)
Zone II	Senegal
Zone III	Ghana
Zone IV	Cameroon (withdrew)
Zone V	no team
Zone VI	Mozambique (withdrew)
Zone VI	South Africa
Zone VII	no team

== Final tournament ==
All times given as local time (UTC+1)

The top two teams advanced. Ethiopia and Senegal were eliminated.

=== Group stage ===
Key to colours in group tables
Teams that advanced to the semifinals

==== Group A ====
Group A consisted of Ethiopia, Nigeria and South Africa.

Team	Pld	W	D	L	GF	GA	GD	Pts
Nigeria	2	1	1	0	5	2	+3	4
South Africa	2	1	1	0	5	3	+2	4
Ethiopia	2	0	0	2	1	6	−5	0

9 July 2007
17:30

South Africa	2–2	Nigeria

Stade Omar Hamadi, Algiers

12 July 2007
17:30

Nigeria	3–0	Ethiopia

Stade Omar Hamadi, Algiers

15 July 2007
17:30

Ethiopia	1–3	South Africa

20 August Stadium, Algiers

==== Group B ====
Group B consisted of Algeria, Ghana and Senegal.

Team	Pld	W	D	L	GF	GA	GD	Pts
Ghana	2	2	0	0	5	1	+4	6
Algeria	2	1	0	1	4	3	+1	3
Senegal	2	0	0	2	1	6	−5	0

9 July 2007
17:30

Ghana	2–1	Algeria
Ankomah 17', 39'		Zerrouki 12'

Stade Ali Benfedda, Zéralda

12 July 2007
17:30

Algeria	3–1	Senegal
Bouhani 9', 15'; Zerrouki 18'		Fall 63'

Stade Ali Benfedda, Zéralda

15 July 2007
17:30

Ghana	3–0	Senegal
Ankomah 39'; Owusu 41', 85'

Stade Omar Hamadi, Algiers

=== Knockout stage ===
Semifinals
21 July – Algiers
Nigeria	5
Algeria	0
21 July – Algiers
Ghana	0
South Africa	2

Final
22 July – Zéralda
Nigeria	4
South Africa	0
Third place
22 July – Algiers
Algeria	1
Ghana	3

==== Semifinals ====
21 July 2007

Nigeria	5–0	Algeria

Omar Hamadi Stadium, Algiers

21 July 2007

Ghana	0–2	South Africa

August 20 Stadium, Algiers

==== Third-place match ====
22 July 2007

Algeria	1–3	Ghana
Laïfa 84'		Baidoo 28'; Ankomah 59' (?)

Zéralda Stadium, Zéralda

==== Final ====
22 July 2007

Nigeria	4–0	South Africa
Chiejine 4', 68'; Okolo 34'; Nkwocha 36'

August 20 Stadium, Algiers

== Final ranking ==
Pos	Team	Pld	W	D	L	GF	GA	GD	Pts	Final result
1st place, gold medalist(s)	Nigeria	4	3	1	0	14	2	+12	10	Gold Medal
2nd place, silver medalist(s)	South Africa	4	2	1	1	7	7	0	7	Silver Medal
3rd place, bronze medalist(s)	Ghana	3	2	0	1	6	6	0	6	Bronze Medal
4	Algeria (H)	4	1	0	3	5	11	−6	3	Fourth place
5	Ethiopia	2	0	0	2	1	6	−5	0	Eliminated in group stage
6	Senegal	2	0	0	2	1	6	−5	0	Eliminated in group stage

(H) Hosts

== See also ==
- Football at the 2007 All-Africa Games – Men's tournament
