= 2006 African Women's Championship qualification =

Tournament details
- Dates: 19 February – 6 August 2006
- Teams: 34 (from 1 confederation)

Tournament statistics
- Matches played: 31
- Goals scored: 129 (4.16 per match)

The 2006 African Women's Championship qualification process was organized by the Confederation of African Football (CAF) to decide the participating teams of the 2006 African Women's Championship. Gabon qualified automatically as hosts, while the remaining seven spots were determined by the qualifying rounds, which took place from February to August 2006. Later, Gabon withdrew from hosting the competition due to organisational reasons. The CAF awarded the hosting of the competition to Nigeria in May 2006.

== Teams ==
A record 34 national teams participated in the qualifying process.

Teams who withdrew before playing a match are in italics.

Round	Teams entering round	No. of teams
Preliminary round	Benin; Botswana; Central African Republic; Djibouti; Lesotho; Libya; Malawi; Mozambique; Namibia; Togo; São Tomé and Príncipe; Senegal; Swaziland; Zambia	14
First round	Algeria; Angola; Congo; DR Congo; Egypt; Equatorial Guinea; Eritrea; Ethiopia; Guinea; Ivory Coast; Kenya; Mali; Morocco; South Africa; Tanzania; Uganda; Zimbabwe	17
Second round	Cameroon; Ghana; Nigeria	3
Qualifying rounds	Total	34
Final tournament	Gabon (original hosts)	1

== Format ==
Qualification ties were played on a home-and-away two-legged basis. If the aggregate score was tied after the second leg, the away goals rule would be applied, and if still level, the penalty shoot-out would be used to determine the winner (no extra time would be played).

The seven winners of the final round qualified for the final tournament.

== Schedule ==
The schedule of the qualifying rounds was as follows.

Round	Leg	Date
Preliminary round	First leg	19 February 2006
Preliminary round	Second leg	26 February 2006
First round	First leg	11–12 March 2006
First round	Second leg	25–26 March 2006
Second round	First leg	22–23 July 2006
Second round	Second leg	4–6 August 2006

== Preliminary round ==
The results of this round do not appear in the Rec.Sport.Soccer Statistics Foundation (RSSSF) or the official FIFA website.

Team 1	Agg.	Team 2	1st leg	2nd leg
Libya	w/o^{1}	Swaziland	—	—
Benin	1–0	Malawi	1–0	0–0
Mozambique	12–0^{2}	Namibia	9–0	3–0
Djibouti	w/o^{1}	Lesotho	—	—
São Tomé and Príncipe	0–9	Togo	0–3	0–6
Zambia	w/o^{1}	Botswana	—	—
Senegal	7–0^{3}	Central African Republic	4–0	3–0

- ^{1} Botswana, Lesotho and Swaziland withdrew.
- ^{2} Namibia withdrew after the first leg.
- ^{3} Central African Republic were disqualified after the first leg.
February 2006

Libya	Cancelled	Swaziland

Libya

Libya won by default and advanced to the first round.

19 February 2006

Benin	1–0	Malawi

Benin
26 February 2006

Malawi	0–0	Benin

Malawi

Benin won 1–0 on aggregate and advanced to the first round.

19 February 2006

Mozambique	9–0	Namibia

Mozambique
February 2006

Namibia	0–3 Awarded	Mozambique

Namibia

Mozambique won by default and advanced to the first round.

February 2006

Djibouti	Cancelled	Lesotho

Djibouti

Djibouti won by default and advanced to the first round.

19 February 2006

São Tomé and Príncipe	0–3	Togo

São Tomé and Príncipe
26 February 2006

Togo	6–0	São Tomé and Príncipe

Togo

Togo won 9–0 on aggregate and advanced to the first round.

February 2006

Zambia	Cancelled	Botswana

Zambia

Zambia won by default and advanced to the first round.

19 February 2006

Senegal	4–0	Central African Republic

Senegal
February 2006

Central African Republic	0–3 Awarded	Senegal

Central African Republic

Senegal won by default and advanced to the first round.

== First round ==
Team 1	Agg.	Team 2	1st leg	2nd leg
Algeria	w/o^{1}	Libya	—	—
Eritrea	w/o^{1}	Egypt	—	—
Morocco	1–6	Mali	0–2	1–4
Benin	2–2 (4–3 p)	Ivory Coast	1–1	1–1
Angola	4–5	Equatorial Guinea	3–2	1–3
South Africa	12–3	Mozambique	6–2	6–1
Uganda	w/o^{1}	Tanzania	—	—
Congo	12–1	Togo	9–0	3–1
Kenya	7–0	Djibouti	7–0	n/p^{2}
DR Congo	6–2	Zambia	3–0	3–2
Senegal	12–1	Guinea	7–0	5–1

- ^{1} Eritrea, Libya and Uganda withdrew. Ethiopia and Zimbabwe also withdrew (they had originally received byes along with South Africa and Algeria).
- ^{2} Only one leg was played between Kenya and Djibouti.
March 2006

Algeria	Cancelled	Libya

Algeria

Algeria won by default and advanced to the second round.

March 2006

Eritrea	Cancelled	Egypt

Eritrea

Egypt won by default and advanced to the second round.

11 March 2006

Morocco	0–2	Mali
	Report	N'Diaye 60'; Samake 75'

Stade de FUS, Rabat
Referee: Fatouma Dia (Senegal)
25 March 2006

Mali	4–1	Morocco
N'Diaye 2'; Coulibaly 4', 67'; Diarra 47'	Report	Sanae 52'

Stade Modibo Kéïta, Bamako

Mali won 6–1 on aggregate and advanced to the second round.

12 March 2006

Benin	1–1	Ivory Coast

Benin
25 March 2006

Ivory Coast	1–1 (a.e.t.)	Benin
Penalties
	3–4

Ivory Coast

2–2 on aggregate. Benin won the penalty shoot-out 4–3 and advanced to the second round.

12 March 2006

Angola	3–2	Equatorial Guinea

Luanda
26 March 2006

Equatorial Guinea	3–1	Angola

Equatorial Guinea

Equatorial Guinea won 5–4 on aggregate and advanced to the second round.

11 March 2006

South Africa	6–2	Mozambique

South Africa
26 March 2006

Mozambique	1–6	South Africa

Mozambique

South Africa won 12–3 on aggregate and advanced to the second round.

March 2006

Uganda	Cancelled	Tanzania

Uganda

Tanzania won by default and advanced to the second round.

12 March 2006

Congo	9–0	Togo
Ndolou 5', 11', 24', 36'; Ilaho 20'; Mahouna 26'; Ndiaye Aminata 81', 87'; Vincthe 89'	Report

Brazzaville
26 March 2006

Togo	1–3	Congo

Lomé

Congo won 12–1 on aggregate and advanced to the second round.

25 March 2006

Kenya	7–0	Djibouti
Mureu 7'; Adhiambo 1H', 52', 84'; Wanjala 36'; Nabwire 44', 2H'	Report

Nyayo National Stadium, Nairobi

Only one leg was played. Kenya won 7–0 and advanced to the second round.

11 March 2006

DR Congo	3–0	Zambia
Bosangi 23'; Zuma 46'; Panda 80'	Report

Lubumbashi
25 March 2006

Zambia	2–3	DR Congo
Lisaka 23', 43'	Report	Mundaya 6'; Mbenza 11'; Mukanu 15'

Chingola

DR Congo won 6–2 on aggregate and advanced to the second round.

12 March 2006

Senegal	7–0	Guinea
Thiaw 5', 35'; Faye 43', 79'; Gomis 48'; Ndiaye 50'; Mbengue 90+2'	Report

Stade Demba Diop, Dakar
26 March 2006

Guinea	1–5	Senegal

Guinea

Senegal won 12–1 on aggregate and advanced to the second round.

== Second round ==
Team 1	Agg.	Team 2	1st leg	2nd leg
Algeria	4–0	Egypt	1–0	3–0
Mali	4–1	Benin	3–1	1–0
Nigeria	n/p^{1}	Equatorial Guinea	—	—
South Africa	7–0	Tanzania	4–0	3–0
Ghana	6–0^{2}	Congo	3–0	3–0
Cameroon	9–0	Kenya	4–0	5–0
DR Congo	3–2	Senegal	3–0	0–2

- ^{1} The tie was scratched after CAF awarded the hosting rights to Nigeria; Equatorial Guinea also qualified.
- ^{2} Congo were disqualified after they failed to appear for the first leg.
23 July 2006

Algeria	1–0	Egypt
Zerrouki 55'	Report

Abdelkader Chabou Stadium, Annaba
5 August 2006

Egypt	0–3	Algeria
	Report	Bouhani 44'; Imloul 54'; Laïfa 88'

Alexandria

Algeria won 4–0 on aggregate and qualified for the final tournament.

22 July 2006

Mali	3–1	Benin
Doumbia 45'; Diarra 51'; N'Diaye 65'	Report	Bathily 90'

Stade Modibo Kéïta, Bamako
6 August 2006

Benin	0–1	Mali
	Report	N'Diaye 48'

Cotonou

Mali won 4–1 on aggregate and qualified for the final tournament.

July 2006

Nigeria	Scratched	Equatorial Guinea

Nigeria

The tie was scratched after Nigeria were awarded the hosting rights: Equatorial Guinea also qualified for the final tournament.

23 July 2006

South Africa	3–0	Tanzania
Phewa 10'; Mosebo 17'; Makanye 90'	Report

Johannesburg
4 August 2006

Tanzania	0–4	South Africa
	Report	Makanye 24'; Mametja 31'; Nyandeni 51'; Phewa 85'

Dar es Salaam

South Africa won 7–0 on aggregate and qualified for the final tournament.

July 2006

Ghana	Cancelled	Congo

Obuasi

Congo disqualified; Ghana qualified for the final tournament.

22 July 2006

Cameroon	4–0	Kenya
Ngono Mani 5', 30'; Mbida 71'; Ngo Ndoumbouk 89'	Report

Ahmadou Ahidjo Stadium, Yaoundé
5 August 2006
16:00 UTC+4

Kenya	0–5	Cameroon

Moi International Sports Centre, Kasarani

Cameroon won 9–0 on aggregate and qualified for the final tournament.

23 July 2006

DR Congo	3–0	Senegal
Vavadio 12'; Malembo 22'; Diasilwa 45'	Report

Kinshasa
5 August 2006

Senegal	2–0	DR Congo

Dakar

DR Congo won 3–2 on aggregate and qualified for the final tournament.

== Qualified teams ==
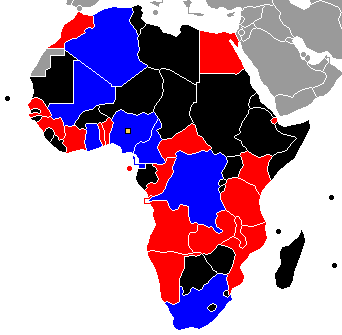
Qualified Did not qualify Did not enter or withdrew Not part of CAF

The following teams qualified for the final tournament.

Team	Qualified as	Qualified on	Previous appearances in tournament^{1}
Nigeria	Replacement hosts	17 May 2006	6 (**1991**, **1995**, **1998**, **2000**, **2002**, **2004**)
Equatorial Guinea	By default	17 May 2006	Debut
South Africa	Winners against Tanzania	4 August 2006	5 (1995, 1998, 2000, 2002, 2004)
Algeria	Winners against Egypt	5 August 2006	1 (2004)
Ghana	Winners by default against Congo	5 August 2006	6 (1991, 1995, 1998, 2000, 2002, 2004)
Cameroon	Winners against Kenya	5 August 2006	5 (1991, 1998, 2000, 2002)
DR Congo	Winners against Senegal	5 August 2006	1 (1998)
Mali	Winners against Benin	6 August 2006	2 (2002, 2004)

^{1} Bold indicates champions for that year. Italic indicates hosts for that year.
