= Aya Jeddi =

Tunisian footballer (born 1999)

Personal information
- Date of birth: 13 August 1999 (age 27)
- Position: Left winger

Team information
- Current team: Al Bayraq

Senior career*
Years	Team	Apps	(Gls)
–2022	Sousse		
2022–2023	Al Ahli SFC		
2023–2024	Al-Shoulla		
2024–	Al Bayraq		

International career
- Tunisia
- * Club domestic league appearances and goals

Aya Jeddi (Arabic: اية جدي; born 13 August 1999) is a Tunisian footballer who plays as a left winger for Saudi club Al Bayraq and the Tunisia women's national team.

== Club career ==
Jeddi has played for Sousse in Tunisia.

== International career ==
Jeddi has capped for Tunisia at senior level, including two friendly away wins over Jordan in June 2021.

=== International goals ===
Scores and results list Tunisia's goal tally first

No.	Date	Venue	Opponent	Score	Result	Competition	Ref.
1	10 June 2021	King Abdullah II Stadium, Amman, Jordan	Jordan	1	2–1	Friendly	
2	27 August 2021	Police Academy Stadium, Cairo, Egypt	Sudan	2	12–1	2021 Arab Women's Cup	
3	30 August 2021	Police Academy Stadium, Cairo, Egypt	Egypt	1	2–2	2021 Arab Women's Cup	

== See also ==
- List of Tunisia women's international footballers
