= Haifa Guedri =

Tunisian football player and manager

Personal information
- Date of birth: 19 January 1989 (age 37)
- Place of birth: Tunis, Tunisia
- Height: 1.70 m (5 ft 7 in)
- Position: Attacking midfielder

Youth career
- Sahel

Senior career*
Years	Team	Apps	(Gls)
2007–2009	Sahel		
2010–20??	TAC		

International career
2004–2015	Tunisia		
- * Club domestic league appearances and goals

Haifa Guedri (Arabic: هيفاء القيدري, born 19 January 1989) is a Tunisian former footballer and current manager. She played as an attacking midfielder and has been a member of the Tunisia women's national team.

== Club career ==
Guedri has played for ASF Sahel and Tunis Air Club in Tunisia.

== International career ==
Guedri capped for Tunisia at senior level during the 2008 African Women's Championship.

=== International goals ===
Scores and results list Tunisia's goal tally first

No.	Date	Venue	Opponent	Score	Result	Competition	Ref.
1	8 March 2008	Stade de Béni Khalled, Béni Khalled, Tunisia	Algeria	1–0	2–1	2008 African Women's Championship qualification	
2	16 November 2008	Estadio La Libertad, Bata, Equatorial Guinea	South Africa	1–?	1–2	2008 African Women's Championship	

== See also ==
- List of Tunisia women's international footballers
