= Yasmine Jemai =

Tunisian footballer (born 1999)

Personal information
- Date of birth: 12 June 1999 (age 27)
- Place of birth: Tunisia
- Position: Midfielder

Team information
- Current team: Al-Suqoor

Senior career*
Years	Team	Apps	(Gls)
–2021	ES Sahel		
2021–2022	Fatih Vatan Spor	5	(2)
2022	Kireçburnu Spor	12	(1)
2022–2023	Al Ahli SFC		
2023–	Al-Suqoor		

International career
- Tunisia
- * Club domestic league appearances and goals as of 22 May 2022

Yasmine Jemai (Arabic: ياسمين الجميعي, born 12 June 1999) is a Tunisian football midfielder who plays for Saudi club Al-Suqoor and the Tunisia women's national team.

== Club career ==
Jemai has played for ES Sahel in Tunisia.

In December 2021, she moved to Turkey and joined Fatih Vatan Spor in Istanbul to play in the 2021–22 Turkish Super League. In the second half of the season, she transferred to Kireçburnu Spor. On 17 October 2022, she left Turkey for Al Ahli SFC in Saudi Arabia.

== International career ==
Jemai has capped for Tunisia at senior level, including two friendly away wins over Jordan in June 2021.

International goals
Date	Venue	Opponent	Competition	Result	Scored
Tunisia women's national football team
20 February 2020	El Kram Stadium, El Kram, Tunisia	Algeria	2020 UNAF Women's Tournament	D 1–1	1
27 August 2021	Police Academy Stadium, Cairo, Egypt	Sudan	2021 Arab Women's Cup	w 12–1	1

== See also ==
- List of Tunisia women's international footballers
