= 2006 Arab Women's Championship =

البطولة العربية لكرة القدم النسائية 2006

Tournament details
- Host country: Egypt
- Dates: 19 – 29 April
- Teams: 7 (from 2 confederations)
- Venue: 1 (in 1 host city)

Final positions
- Champions: Algeria (1st title)
- Runners-up: Morocco
- Third place: Tunisia
- Fourth place: Egypt

Tournament statistics
- Top scorer: (Tunisia) Nassima Abidi (7 goals)

The 2006 Arab Women's Championship (Arabic: البطولة العربية لكرة القدم النسائية 2006) was the first edition of the Arab Women's Championship for national women's football teams affiliated with the Union of Arab Football Associations (UAFA). The tournament was hosted by Egypt between 19 and 29 April 2006. The winner was Algeria.

== Participating teams ==
The 7 participated teams are:

- Algeria
- Egypt (hosts)
- Lebanon
- Morocco
- Palestine
- Syria
- Tunisia

== Venues ==
Alexandria	2006 Arab Women's Championship is located in Egypt
Alexandria Stadium	2006 Arab Women's Championship is located in Egypt
Capacity: 13,660	2006 Arab Women's Championship is located in Egypt

== Group stage ==
=== Group A ===
Team	Pld	W	D	L	GF	GA	GD	Pts
Egypt	3	3	0	0	17	1	+16	9
Tunisia	3	2	0	1	15	2	+13	6
Syria	3	1	0	2	2	17	−15	3
Palestine	3	0	0	3	1	15	−14	0

20 April 2006
14:00

Palestine	1–2	Syria
... 37'		... 39'... 50'

Alexandria Stadium, Alexandria

20 April 2006
17:00

Egypt	2–1	Tunisia
Abdulmalek 54'; Rashad 79' (pen.)		Hadhraoui 6'

Alexandria Stadium, Alexandria

22 April 2006
15:00

Palestine	0–4	Tunisia
		Abidi 13', 16', 79'; Zine 15'

Alexandria Stadium, Alexandria

22 April 2006
17:00

Syria	0–6	Egypt
		Abdulmalek 7', 50'; Abdel-Halim 23', 48'; Rashad 39'; Abdullatif 90+2'

Alexandria Stadium, Alexandria

24 April 2006
14:00

Tunisia	10–0	Syria
Abidi ( .)

Alexandria Stadium, Alexandria

24 April 2006
16:30

Egypt	9–0	Palestine

Alexandria Stadium, Alexandria

=== Group B ===
Team	Pld	W	D	L	GF	GA	GD	Pts
Algeria	2	1	1	0	12	0	+12	4
Morocco	2	1	1	0	8	0	+8	4
Lebanon	2	0	0	2	0	20	−20	0

19 April 2006
15:00

Lebanon	0–12	Algeria

Alexandria Stadium, Alexandria

21 April 2006
15:00

Algeria	0–0	Morocco

Alexandria Stadium, Alexandria

23 April 2006
15:00

Morocco	8–0	Lebanon

Alexandria Stadium, Alexandria

== Knockout phase ==
The semi-final winners proceed to the final and those who lost compete in the third place playoff.

Semi-finals
26 April – Alexandria
Algeria	3
Tunisia	0
26 April – Alexandria
Egypt	2
Morocco (aet)	4

Final
29 April – Alexandria
Algeria	1
Morocco	0
Third place
29 April – Alexandria
Egypt	1
Tunisia	2

=== Semi-finals ===
26 April 2006
14:00

Algeria	3–0	Tunisia

Alexandria Stadium, Alexandria

26 April 2006
17:00

Egypt	2–4 (a.e.t.)	Morocco

Alexandria Stadium, Alexandria

=== Third place match ===
29 April 2006
13:00

Egypt	1–2	Tunisia
Rashad 79'		Abidi (...)

Alexandria Stadium, Alexandria

=== Final ===
29 April 2006
16:00

Algeria	1–0	Morocco
Boumrar 79'

Alexandria Stadium, Alexandria

== Winners ==
2006 Arab Women's Championship winners

Algeria
First title

== Goalscorers ==
7 goals

- (Tunisia) Nassima Abidi

6 goals

- (Algeria) Lilia Boumrar
- (Algeria) Dalila Zerrouki
- (Tunisia) Dina Hadhraoui

== Final ranking ==
Pos	Team	Pld	W	D	L	GF	GA	Dif	Pts
1	Algeria	4	3	1	0	16	0	+16	10
2	Morocco	4	2	1	1	12	3	+9	7
3	Tunisia	5	3	0	2	17	6	+11	9
4	Egypt (H)	5	3	0	2	20	7	+13	9
5	Syria	3	1	0	2	2	17	−15	3
6	Palestine	3	0	0	3	1	15	−14	0
7	Lebanon	3	0	0	3	0	20	−20	0
