= Lydia Belkacemi =

Algerian footballer (born 1994)

Personal information
- Date of birth: 2 March 1994 (age 32)
- Place of birth: Tazmalt, Algeria
- Position: Midfielder

Team information
- Current team: Metz
- Number: 7

Senior career*
Years	Team	Apps	(Gls)
2009–2013	Le Mans	51	(10)
2013–2017	Soyaux	54	(1)
2017–2019	Brest	47	(9)
2019–2022	Orléans	37	(0)
2022–2023	Brest	10	(1)
2023–	Metz	15	(0)

International career
2010	France U16		
2009–2011	France U17		
2011–2012	France U19		
2018–	Algeria		
- * Club domestic league appearances and goals as of 19 May 2024

Lydia Belkacemi (born 2 March 1994) is an Algerian footballer who plays as a midfielder for Seconde Ligue club Metz and the Algeria national team.

She played for Algeria at the 2018 Africa Women Cup of Nations, where she scored in the match against Mali.

She also holds French citizenship and had previously represented France at youth international levels.
