= Ghada Ayadi =

Tunisian footballer (born 1992)

Personal information
- Date of birth: 10 August 1992 (age 34)
- Positions: Forward; attacking midfielder; right back

Team information
- Current team: Al Nassr

Senior career*
| Years | Team | Apps | (Gls) |
| 2017 | SAS | | |
| 2021–2022 | Amman | | |
| 2022– | Al Nassr | +10 | (+5) |

International career
- Tunisia
- * Club domestic league appearances and goals

Ghada Ayadi (Arabic: غادة عيادي; born 10 August 1992) is a Tunisian footballer who plays as a forward, an attacking midfielder and a right back for Al Nassr and the Tunisia national team.

== Honours ==
Al Nassr

- Saudi Women's Premier League: 2022–23, 2023–24

== International career ==
Ayadi has capped for Tunisia at senior level, including two friendly away wins over Jordan in June 2021.

=== International goals ===
Scores and results list Tunisia's goal tally first

| No. | Date | Venue | Opponent | Score | Result | Competition | Ref. |
|---|---|---|---|---|---|---|---|
| 1 | 3 September 2021 | Osman Ahmed Osman Stadium , Cairo, Egypt | Algeria | 1 | 2–2 | 2021 Arab Women's Cup | |

== See also ==
- List of Tunisia women's international footballers
