= Mercy Myles =

Ghanaian footballer

Personal information
- Date of birth: 2 May 1992 (age 34)
- Place of birth: Dodowa
- Position: Midfielder

Senior career*
| Years | Team | Apps | (Gls) |
- Reformers Ladies

International career^{‡}
- Ghana
- * Club domestic league appearances and goals as of Canada ‡ National team caps and goals as of 11 October 2014 (before the 2014 African Women's Championship)

Mercy Myles is a Ghanaian international footballer who plays as a midfielder for the Ghana women's national football team. She was part of the team at the 2011 All-Africa Games scoring a goal in the semi-final against Algeria and at the 2014 African Women's Championship. Myles has participated in the FIFA U17 World Cup and two U20 World Cups, serving as team captain in two. Following a successful youth career, Myles went on to represent the Ghana Senior Women's National Team where she served as interim captain. Currently, Myles plays for St. Francis Xavier University in Canada where she has been a two-time U SPORTS All-Canadian selection and team MVP. At the club level, she played for Reformers Ladies in Ghana and currently represents Highland FC at the senior club level in Canada.

== International goals ==
| No. | Date | Venue | Opponent | Score | Result | Competition |
|---|---|---|---|---|---|---|
| 1. | 13 September 2011 | Estádio do Maxaquene, Maputo, Mozambique | Algeria | 3–0 | 3–0 | 2011 All-Africa Games |
| 2. | 18 July 2015 | Stade Ahmadou Ahidjo, Yaoundé, Cameroon | Cameroon | 1–0 | 1–1 | 2015 CAF Women's Olympic Qualifying Tournament |
