= Fatima Sekouane =

Algerian footballer (born 1983)

Personal information
- Date of birth: 21 May 1983 (age 43)
- Place of birth: Oran, Algeria
- Position: Defender

Team information
- Current team: MC Oran (manager)

Youth career
- 1996–1999: AS Intissar Oran

Senior career*
| Years | Team | Apps | (Gls) |
| 1999–2005 | AS Intissar Oran | | |
| 2005–2006 | USM Oran | | |
| 2006–2009 | AS Intissar Oran | | |
| 2009–2017 | Afak Relizane | | |
| 2017–2019 | FC Constantine | | |

International career
| 2002–2018 | Algeria | | |

Managerial career
- 2025–: MC Oran
- * Club domestic league appearances and goals

Fatima Sekouane (Arabic: فطيمة سكوان, born 21 May 1983) is a former Algerian women's international footballer who played as a defender.

== Club career ==
Sekouane was formed in AS Intissar Oran, she has played essentially for Intissar and for Afak Relizane in Algeria.

== International career ==
Sekouane is a member of the Algeria women's national football team. She was part of the team at the 2006 African Women's Championship, at the 2010 African Women's Championship, at the 2014 African Women's Championship as the team captain and the 2018 Africa Women Cup of Nations.
