= Amina Chahinez Hemour =

Algerian footballer (born 1983)

Personal information
- Date of birth: 4 August 1983 (age 43)
- Place of birth: Bab El Oued, Algeria
- Height: 1.59 m (5 ft 3 in)
- Position: Forward

Team information
- Current team: Afak Relizane

Senior career*
Years	Team	Apps	(Gls)
1997–2018	ASE Alger Centre	-	(-)
2018–2023	CFN Boumerdes	-	(-)
2023–	Afak Relizane	-	(-)

International career^{‡}
2006–2018	Algeria	3	(0)
- * Club domestic league appearances and goals ‡ National team caps and goals as of 20 June 2019

Amina Chahinez Hemour (Arabic: أمينة شاهينيز حمور; born 4 August 1983) is an Algerian footballer who played as a forward for Afak Relizane. She has been a member of the Algeria women's national team.

== Club career ==
Hemour has played for ASE Alger Centre in Algeria.

== International career ==
Hemour capped for Algeria at senior level during two Africa Women Cup of Nations editions (2006 and 2018).
