= Laura Taleb Muller =

Algerian footballer (born 1999)

Laura Muller لورا مولر
Personal information
- Full name: Laura Carine Taleb Muller
- Date of birth: 9 January 1999 (age 27)
- Place of birth: Metz, France
- Height: 1.72 m (5 ft 8 in)
- Position: Forward

Team information
- Current team: Thonon Evian
- Number: 15

Youth career
- 2014–2018: Metz

Senior career*
Years	Team	Apps	(Gls)
2018–2022	La Roche-sur-Yon	55	(17)
2022–2024	Le Havre	4	(0)
2024–	Thonon Evian	8	(2)

International career^{‡}
2021–	Algeria	7	(2)
- * Club domestic league appearances and goals as of 28 November 2024 ‡ National team caps and goals as of 27 November 2024

Laura Carine Taleb Muller (Arabic: لورا كارين طالب مولر; born 9 January 1999) is a professional footballer who plays as a forward for Seconde Ligue club Thonon Evian. Born in France, she plays for the Algeria national team.

== Club career ==
Muller was formed at FC Metz Academy. In 2018, she signed with La Roche ESOF, in the Division 2 Féminine. Despite being approached by other clubs at the end of the 2019–20 season, She decided to remain loyal to her club until she departed in 2022.

In July 2022, She joined Le Havre in Division 1 Féminine.

== International career ==
In September 2021, Muller got her first call-up to the Algerian Senior team to participate in a preparation camp for the 2022 Women's Africa Cup of Nations qualification. In November 2021, after she got recalled for Tunisia friendlies, Muller made her debut for the team on 25 November 2021, after she came as substitute in the 65th minute. On 28 November 2021, she scored her first international goal in a 4–2 win against Tunisia.

== Career statistics ==
=== Club ===
As of 31 March 2024

Appearances and goals by club, season and competition
Club	Season	League			Cup		Continental		Other		Total	
Club	Season	Division	Apps	Goals	Apps	Goals	Apps	Goals	Apps	Goals	Apps	Goals
La Roche ESOF	2018–19	Division 2 Féminine	16	6	3	2	—		—		19	8
La Roche ESOF	2019–20	Division 2 Féminine	16	4	1	0	—		—		17	4
La Roche ESOF	2020–21	Division 2 Féminine	3	2	—		—		—		3	2
La Roche ESOF	2021–22	Division 2 Féminine	20	5	1	0	—		—		21	5
La Roche ESOF	Total		55	17	5	2	—		—		60	19
Le Havre	2022–23	Division 1 Féminine	4	0	0	0	—		—		4	0
Le Havre	2023–24	Division 1 Féminine	0	0	0	0	—		—		0	0
Le Havre	Total		4	0	0	0	—		—		4	0
Career total			59	17	5	2	—		—		64	19

=== International ===
As of match played 27 November 2024

Year	Algeria	
Year	Apps	Goals
2021	2	1
2022	2	0
2024	4	1
Total	8	2

As of match played 27 November 2024
Scores and results list Algeria's goal tally first, score column indicates score after each Muller goal.

List of international goals scored by Laura Muller
No.	Date	Venue	Opponent	Score	Result	Competition
1	28 November 2021	Stade Municipal d'Ariana, Ariana, Tunisia	Tunisia	3–0	4–2	International Friendly
2	27 November 2024	Mustapha Tchaker Stadium, Blida, Algeria	Uganda	1–0	2–1	International Friendly
3	19 February 2025	Juba Stadium, Juba, South Sudan	South Sudan	1–0	5–0	2026 WAFCON qualifiers
