= Elizabeth Cudjoe =

Ghanaian footballer

Personal information
- Date of birth: 17 October 1992 (age 34)
- Position: Forward

Senior career*
Years	Team	Apps	(Gls)
- Hasaacas Ladies

International career^{‡}
	Ghana	6	(3)
- * Club domestic league appearances and goals ‡ National team caps and goals as of 13 February 2018

Elizabeth Cudjoe (born 17 October 1992) is a Ghanaian footballer who plays as a forward for the Ghana women's national football team. She made her international debut at the FIFA U-17 Women's World Cup New Zealand 2008. She was part of the senior national team at the 2011 All-Africa Games where she scored against Algeria and at the 2014 African Women's Championship. At the club level, she played for Hasaacas Ladies in Ghana.

== International goals ==
No.	Date	Venue	Opponent	Score	Result	Competition
1.	14 September 2011	Estádio do Maxaquene, Maputo, Mozambique	Algeria	1–0	3–0	2011 All-Africa Games
2.	14 September 2011	Estádio do Maxaquene, Maputo, Mozambique	Algeria	2–0	3–0	2011 All-Africa Games
