= Naïma Bouhani =

Algerian footballer (born 1985)

Personal information
- Full name: Naïma Bouhani Benziane
- Date of birth: 23 October 1985 (age 41)
- Place of birth: Oran, Algeria
- Height: 1.65 m (5 ft 5 in)
- Position: Forward

Youth career
- 1998–2001: AS Intissar Oran

Senior career*
Years	Team	Apps	(Gls)
2001–2005	AS Intissar Oran		
2005–2006	ASE Alger Centre		
2006–2007	ASJ Canastel		
2007–2008	Sadaka SC		
2008–2009	AS Intissar Oran		
2009–2011	Afak Relizane		
2011–2012	FC Vendenheim		
2012–2017	Afak Relizane		
2017–2018	FC Constantine		
2019–2023	Afak Relizane		
2023–2024	Al-Amal		
2024	Etihad Club	15	(26)
2024–2025	Afak Relizane		

International career^{‡}
2002–2025	Algeria	61	(36)
- * Club domestic league appearances and goals as of 7 February 2026 ‡ National team caps and goals as of 19 February 2026

Naïma Bouhani Benziane (Arabic: نعيمة بوهاني بن زيان; born 23 October 1985), known as Naïma Bouhani, was an Algerian footballer who plays as a forward for Afak Relizane as the last club in Algerian Women's Championship and the Algeria women's national team.

== Early life ==
Bouhani was born in Oran.

== Club career ==
Bouhani played for many clubs, but essentially for AS Intissar Oran and for Afak Relizane. In 2011, she went to France and played for FC Vendenheim in France. She returned to Afak Relizane until 2012. In 2023, she moved to the Saudi Women's First Division League to play with Al-Amal to contribute to its qualification to the Saudi Women's Premier League.

== International career ==
Bouhani capped for Algeria at senior level Africa Women Cup of Nations in 2004, 2006, 2010 and 2014. On 5 September 2022, Bouhani announced her retirement from international football. She returned playing for the national team in September 2023.

=== International goals ===
Scores and results list Algeria's goal tally first

As of match played 19 February 2025

No.	Date	Venue	Opponent	Score	Result	Competition
1	5 August 2006	Alexandria Stadium, Alexandria, Egypt	Egypt	0–1	0–3	2006 African Women's Championship qualification
2	3 November 2006	Oghara Township Stadium, Oghara, Nigeria	Equatorial Guinea	2–1	3–3	2006 African Women's Championship
3	3 November 2006	Oghara Township Stadium, Oghara, Nigeria	Equatorial Guinea	3–2	3–3	2006 African Women's Championship
4	12 July 2007	Stade Ali Benfedda, Zéralda, Algeria	Senegal	1–0	3–1	2007 All-Africa Games
5	12 July 2007	Stade Ali Benfedda, Zéralda, Algeria	Senegal	2–0	3–1	2007 All-Africa Games
6	16 December 2007	Stade Ali Benfedda, Zéralda, Algeria	Morocco	1–1	2–1	2008 African Women's Championship qualification
7	22 May 2010	Stade de Koléa, Koléa, Algeria	Tunisia	1–1	1–1	2010 African Women's Championship qualification
8	8 November 2010	Makhulong Stadium, Tembisa, South Africa	Cameroon	1–1	2–1	2010 African Women's Championship
9	10 September 2011	Estádio da Machava, Maputo, Mozambique	Mozambique	1–2	1–7	2011 All-Africa Games
10	10 September 2011	Estádio da Machava, Maputo, Mozambique	Mozambique	1–6	1–7	2011 All-Africa Games
11	16 September 2011	Estádio do Maxaquene, Maputo, Mozambique	South Africa	0–2	0–3	2011 All-Africa Games
12	14 February 2014	Stade Omar Hamadi, Algiers, Algeria	Morocco	1–0	2–0	2014 African Women's Championship qualification
13	14 February 2014	Stade Omar Hamadi, Algiers, Algeria	Morocco	2–0	2–0	2014 African Women's Championship qualification
14	8 June 2014	Stade 15 Octobre, Bizerte, Tunisia	Tunisia	0–1	2–3	2014 African Women's Championship qualification
15	1 October 2014	Independence Stadium, Windhoek, Namibia	Namibia	2–1	2–1	Friendly
16	5 February 2016	CTN Sidi Moussa, Algiers, Algeria	Mali	1–0	5–0	Friendly
17	5 February 2016	CTN Sidi Moussa, Algiers, Algeria	Mali	2–0	5–0	Friendly
18	8 April 2016	Stade Omar Hamadi, Algiers, Algeria	Kenya	1–0	2–2	2016 Africa Women Cup of Nations qualification
19	8 April 2016	Stade Omar Hamadi, Algiers, Algeria	Kenya	2–2	2–2	2016 Africa Women Cup of Nations qualification
20	12 April 2016	MISC Kasarani, Nairobi, Kenya	Kenya	0–1	1–1	2016 Africa Women Cup of Nations qualification
21	12 February 2017	Petra Stadium, Amman, Jordan	Jordan	1–2	2–3	Friendly
22	16 June 2017	Petra Stadium, Amman, Jordan	Jordan	0–1	0–1	Friendly
23	10 June 2018	Addis Ababa Stadium, Addis Ababa, Ethiopia	Ethiopia	0–1	2–3	2018 Africa Women Cup of Nations qualification
24	25 August 2021	Air Defense Stadium, Cairo, Egypt	Jordan	0–1	1–3	2021 Arab Women's Cup
25	28 August 2021	Air Defense Stadium, Cairo, Egypt	Palestine	3–1	4–1	2021 Arab Women's Cup
26	3 September 2021	Osman Ahmed Osman Stadium, Cairo, Egypt	Tunisia	2–2	2–2	2021 Arab Women's Cup
27	20 October 2021	Stade Omar Hamadi, Algiers, Algeria	Sudan	2–0	14–0	2022 Africa Women Cup of Nations qualification
28	20 October 2021	Stade Omar Hamadi, Algiers, Algeria	Sudan	4–0	14–0	2022 Africa Women Cup of Nations qualification
29	20 October 2021	Stade Omar Hamadi, Algiers, Algeria	Sudan	8–0	14–0	2022 Africa Women Cup of Nations qualification
30	20 October 2021	Stade Omar Hamadi, Algiers, Algeria	Sudan	9–0	14–0	2022 Africa Women Cup of Nations qualification
31	26 September 2023	Miloud Hadefi Stadium, Oran, Algeria	Uganda	1–0	1–1	2024 Women's Africa Cup of Nations qualification
32	24 February 2024	CTN Sidi Moussa, Algiers, Algeria	Burkina Faso	2–0	2–0	Friendly
33	4 April 2024	Chedly Zouiten Stadium, Tunis, Tunisia	Tunisia	0–1	2–1	Friendly
34	7 April 2024	Chedly Zouiten Stadium, Tunis, Tunisia	Tunisia	0–1	2–2	Friendly
35	7 April 2024	Chedly Zouiten Stadium, Tunis, Tunisia	Tunisia	1–2	2–2	Friendly
36	19 February 2025	Juba Stadium, Juba, South Sudan	South Sudan	0–3	0–5	2026 Women's Africa Cup of Nations qualification
