= Myriam Benlazar =

Algerian footballer (born 1995)

Myriam Benlazar ميريام بن لازار (Arabic)
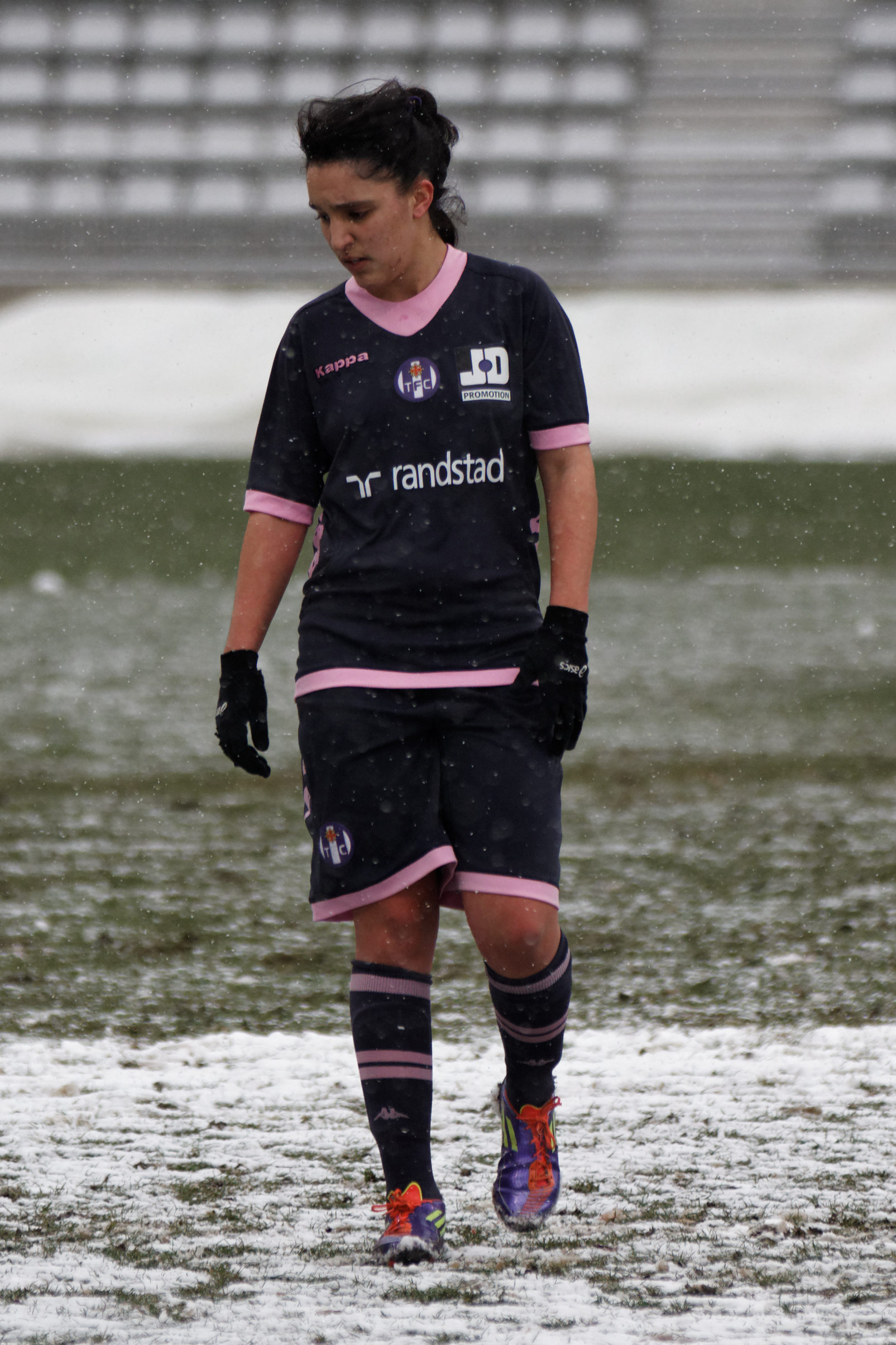

Personal information
- Full name: Myriam Yasmine Benlazar
- Date of birth: 9 June 1995 (age 31)
- Place of birth: Toulouse, France
- Height: 1.63 m (5 ft 4 in)
- Position: Midfielder

Team information
- Current team: Zulte Waregem
- Number: 24

Senior career*
Years	Team	Apps	(Gls)
2012–2015	Toulouse	36	(5)
2015–2018	ASPTT Albi	47	(1)
2018–2019	Toulouse	17	(2)
2023–	Zulte Waregem	11	(1)

International career
2011	France U16		
2014–	Algeria		
- * Club domestic league appearances and goals as of 16 July 2023 (UTC)

Myriam Yasmine Benlazar (Arabic: ميريام ياسمين بن لازار; born 9 June 1995) is a footballer who plays for Toulouse. Born in France, she plays for the Algeria national team.

She played for Algeria at the 2014 African Women's Championship and the 2018 Africa Women Cup of Nations.

She had previously represented the France national under-16 team.
