= Kenza Hadjar =

Algerian footballer (born 1992)

Personal information
- Date of birth: 24 December 1992 (age 33)
- Position: Midfielder

Team information
- Current team: Al-Shoulla

Senior career*
Years	Team	Apps	(Gls)
- Sûreté Nationale
2022–2023	Al Yamamah	8	(3)
2023–2024	Al Bayraq		
2024–	Al-Shoulla		

International career
2014–	Algeria		
- * Club domestic league appearances and goals

Kenza Hadjar (Arabic: كنزة حجار; born 24 December 1992) is an Algerian footballer who plays as a midfielder for Saudi club Al-Shoulla and the Algeria women's national team.

== Club career ==
Hadjar had played for Sûreté Nationale in Algeria.

== International career ==
Hadjar capped for Algeria at senior level during the 2021 Arab Women's Cup.
