= Fethia Bekhedda =

Algerian footballer (born 1990)

Personal information
- Date of birth: 9 July 1990 (age 36)
- Position: Defender

Team information
- Current team: GF Khroub
- Number: 15

International career^{‡}
Years	Team	Apps	(Gls)
2014–	Algeria	3	(0)
- ‡ National team caps and goals as of 20 June 2019

Fethia Bekhedda (born 9 July 1990) is an Algerian international footballer who plays as a defender for the Algeria women's national football team. She competed for Algeria at the 2018 Africa Women Cup of Nations, playing in three matches.
