= Kelthoum Arbi Aouda =

Algerian footballer (born 1987)

Personal information
- Date of birth: 25 September 1987 (age 39)
- Position: Defender

Team information
- Current team: Afak Relizane

Senior career*
Years	Team	Apps	(Gls)
- Afak Relizane

International career
- Algeria
- * Club domestic league appearances and goals

Kelthoum Arbi Aouda (Arabic: كلثوم عربي عودة; born 25 September 1987) is an Algerian footballer who plays as a defender for Afak Relizane and the Algeria women's national team.

== Club career ==
Arbi Aouda has played for Afak Relizane in Algeria.

== International career ==
Arbi Aouda capped for Algeria at senior level during the 2021 Arab Women's Cup.

== Personal life ==
Arbi Aouda is Muslim, wearing hijab even during her international football matches.
