= Nabila Idoughi =

French–Algerian footballer (born 1986)

Personal information
- Date of birth: 3 November 1986 (age 39)
- Place of birth: Meudon, France
- Height: 1.67 m (5 ft 6 in)
- Position: Defender

Senior career*
Years	Team	Apps	(Gls)
2001–2011	Bagneux	80+	(0+)

International career^{‡}
2006	Algeria	3	(0)
- * Club domestic league appearances and goals ‡ National team caps and goals as of 3 November 2006.

Nabila Idoughi (Arabic: نبيلة ادوغي; born 3 November 1986) is a French and Algerian former footballer who played as a defender. She has been a member of the Algeria women's national team.

== Club career ==
Idoughi has played for Bagneux in France.

== International career ==
Idoughi capped for Algeria at senior level during the 2006 African Women's Championship.
