= Cyrille Zuma =

DR Congolese football player and manager

Personal information
- Full name: Mamita Zuma
- Date of birth: 25 November 1988 (age 37)
- Place of birth: Kinshasa, Zaire (now DR Congo)
- Position: Centre-forward

Senior career*
Years	Team	Apps	(Gls)
- Mbilinga de Matete
- La Source
- La Colombe
- Progresso do Sambizanga
- Bayelsa Queens
- Grand Hôtel

International career^{‡}
2006	DR Congo	3+	(1+)
- * Club domestic league appearances and goals ‡ National team caps and goals as of 4 November 2006.

Mamita Zuma, «Cyrille» (born 25 November 1988) is a DR Congolese football manager and retired player who played as a centre-forward. She has captained the DR Congo women's national team.

== Early life ==
Zuma was born in Kinshasa.

== Club career ==
Zuma started in 2003. She has played for Mbilinga de Matete and Grand Hôtel in the Democratic Republic of the Congo, for La Source and La Colombe in the Republic of the Congo, for Progresso do Sambizanga in Angola and for Bayelsa Queens in Nigeria. She retired in 2013.

== International career ==
Zuma was capped for the DR Congo at senior level during the 2006 African Women's Championship.

=== International goals ===
Scores and results list DR Congo's goal tally first

No.	Date	Venue	Opponent	Score	Result	Competition	Ref.
1	1 November 2006	Oghara Township Stadium, Oghara, Nigeria	Mali	1–0	2–3	2006 African Women's Championship	

== See also ==
- List of Democratic Republic of the Congo women's international footballers
