= Nassima Abidi =

Tunisian footballer

Senior career*
Years	Team	Apps	(Gls)
- ISSEP Kef

International career
- Tunisia
- * Club domestic league appearances and goals

Nassima Abidi (Arabic: نسيمة العبيدي) is a Tunisian former footballer. She has been a member of the Tunisia women's national team.

== Club career ==
Abidi has played for ISSEP Kef in Tunisia.

== International career ==
Abidi capped for Tunisia at senior level during the 2008 African Women's Championship.

=== International goals ===
Scores and results list Tunisia's goal tally first

No.	Date	Venue	Opponent	Score	Result	Competition	Ref.
1	22 April 2006	Alexandria Stadium, Alexandria, Egypt	Palestine	1–0	4–0	2006 Arab Women's Championship	
2	22 April 2006	Alexandria Stadium, Alexandria, Egypt	Palestine	3–0	4–0	2006 Arab Women's Championship	
3	22 April 2006	Alexandria Stadium, Alexandria, Egypt	Palestine	4–0	4–0	2006 Arab Women's Championship	
4	24 April 2006	Alexandria Stadium, Alexandria, Egypt	Syria	?–0	10–0	2006 Arab Women's Championship	
5	24 April 2006	Alexandria Stadium, Alexandria, Egypt	Syria	?–0	10–0	2006 Arab Women's Championship	
6	29 April 2006	Alexandria Stadium, Alexandria, Egypt	Egypt	1–?	2–1	2006 Arab Women's Championship	
7	29 April 2006	Alexandria Stadium, Alexandria, Egypt	Egypt	2–?	2–1	2006 Arab Women's Championship	
8	22 November 2008	Estadio de Malabo, Malabo, Equatorial Guinea	Ghana	2–1	2–3	2008 African Women's Championship	

== See also ==
- List of Tunisia women's international footballers
