= Madina Ramdani =

Algerian footballer (born 1991)

Personal information
- Date of birth: 13 May 1991 (age 35)
- Place of birth: Algiers, Algeria
- Height: 1.60 m (5 ft 3 in)
- Position: Forward

Team information
- Current team: Sûreté Nationale

Senior career*
Years	Team	Apps	(Gls)
- Sûreté Nationale

International career^{‡}
2018–	Algeria	2	(0)
- * Club domestic league appearances and goals ‡ National team caps and goals as of 20 June 2019

Madina Ramdani (Arabic: مدينة رمضان; born 13 May 1991) is an Algerian footballer who plays as a forward for AS Sûreté Nationale and the Algeria women's national team.

== Club career ==
Ramdani has played for Sûreté Nationale in Algeria.

== International career ==
Ramdani competed for Algeria at the 2018 Africa Women Cup of Nations, playing in two matches.
