= Zina Hidouri =

Tunisian footballer

Personal information
- Position: Forward

Senior career*
Years	Team	Apps	(Gls)
- TAC
- Banque de l’Habitat

International career^{‡}
2009–2014	Tunisia	5+	(2+)
- * Club domestic league appearances and goals ‡ National team caps and goals as of 1 March 2014.

Zina Hidouri (Arabic: زينة حيدوري) is a Tunisian former footballer. She played as a forward and has captained the Tunisia women's national team.

== Club career ==
Hidouri has played for Tunis Air Club and AS Banque de l’Habitat in Tunisia.

== International career ==
Hidouri capped for Tunisia at senior level during two Africa Women Cup of Nations qualifications (2012 and 2014).

=== International goals ===
Scores and results list Tunisia's goal tally first

No.	Date	Venue	Opponent	Score	Result	Competition	Ref.
1	14 February 2014	Al Ahly Training Centre, 6th October City, Egypt	Egypt	1–0	3–0	2014 African Women's Championship qualification	
2	1 March 2014	Stade 15 Octobre, Bizerte, Tunisia	Egypt	2–1	2–2	2014 African Women's Championship qualification	

== See also ==
- List of Tunisia women's international footballers
