= Djamila Marek =

Algerian footballer (born 1980)

Personal information
- Date of birth: 5 May 1980 (age 46)
- Place of birth: Tizi Ouzou, Algeria
- Height: 1.55 m (5 ft 1 in)
- Position: Forward

Senior career*
Years	Team	Apps	(Gls)
1996–2000	Kabylie		
2000–2018	Alger Centre		

International career^{‡}
2006–2018	Algeria	4	(0)
2011	United Arab Emirates	4+	(6)
- * Club domestic league appearances and goals ‡ National team caps and goals as of 20 June 2019

Djamila Marek (Arabic: جميلة ماريك; born 5 May 1980) is an Algerian former footballer who played as a forward for the Algeria women's national team.

== Club career ==
Marek has played for JS Kabylie and ASE Alger Centre in Algeria.

== International career ==
Marek capped for Algeria at senior level during two Africa Women Cup of Nations editions (2006 and 2018).
