= Dalila Zerrouki =

Algerian football player and manager (born 1982)

Personal information
- Date of birth: 1 January 1982 (age 44)
- Place of birth: Chlef, Algeria
- Height: 1.60 m (5 ft 3 in)
- Position: Forward

Senior career*
Years	Team	Apps	(Gls)
1999–2002	Blida		
2003–2006	Alger Centre		
2008–2009	Lyon B	15	(8)
2009–2012	Claix	49	(49)

International career^{‡}
2004–2016	Algeria	8+	(6+)
2011	United Arab Emirates	4+	(5)

Managerial career
- Al Ain FC U8
- * Club domestic league appearances and goals ‡ National team caps and goals as of 26 March 2016

Dalila Zerrouki (Arabic: دليلة زروقي; born 1 February 1982) is an Algerian football and football manager. She played as a forward and represented the Algeria women's national team at senior international level. During her club career, she played in Algeria for FC Blida and ASE Alger Centre before moving to France, where she played for Lyon B and Claix.

== Early life ==
Zerrouki was born in Chlef.

== Club career ==
Zerrouki has played for FC Blida and ASE Alger Centre in Algeria and for Lyon B and Claix in France.

== International career ==
Zerrouki capped for Algeria at senior level during the 2006 African Women's Championship.

=== International goals ===
Scores and results list Algeria's goal tally first

No.	Date	Venue	Opponent	Score	Result	Competition
1	11 July 2004	Bamako, Mali	Mali	0–1	2–2	2004 African Women's Championship qualification
2	11 July 2004	Bamako, Mali	Mali	1-2	2–2	2004 African Women's Championship qualification
3	23 July 2004	Stade Mustapha Tchaker, Blida, Algeria	Mali	1-0	1-0	2004 African Women's Championship qualification
4	23 July 2006	Abdelkader Chabou Stadium, Annaba, Algeria	Egypt	1–0	1–0	2006 African Women's Championship qualification
5	9 July 2007	Stade Ali Benfedda, Zéralda, Algeria	Ghana	2-1	2-1	2007 All-Africa Games
6	12 July 2007	Stade Ali Benfedda, Zéralda, Algeria	Senegal	3–0	3–1	2007 All-Africa Games
7	2 December 2007	Stade El Abdi, El Jadida	Morocco	0–1	0–1	2008 African Women's Championship qualification
8	16 September 2011	Estádio do Maxaquene, Maputo, Mozambique	South Africa	0–1	0–3	2011 All-Africa Games
9	6 March 2016	Stade Omar Hamadi, Algiers, Algeria	Ethiopia	1–0	1–2	2016 Africa Women Cup of Nations qualification
10	26 March 2016	Yidnekachew Tessema Stadium, Addis Ababa, Ethiopia	Ethiopia	1-1	1-1	2016 Africa Women Cup of Nations qualification

=== International goals ===
Scores and results list United Arab Emirates goal tally first

No.	Date	Venue	Opponent	Score	Result	Competition	Ref.
1	4 October 2011	Zayed Bin Sultan Stadium, Abu Dhabi, United Arab Emirates	Syria	1–0	6–0	2011 WAFF Women's Championship	
2	4 October 2011	Zayed Bin Sultan Stadium, Abu Dhabi, United Arab Emirates	Syria	5–0	6–0	2011 WAFF Women's Championship	
3	8 October 2011	Zayed Bin Sultan Stadium, Abu Dhabi, United Arab Emirates	Lebanon	3–0	5–0	2011 WAFF Women's Championship	
4	10 October 2011	Zayed Bin Sultan Stadium, Abu Dhabi, United Arab Emirates	Bahrain	3–0	4–0	2011 WAFF Women's Championship	
5	12 October 2011	Zayed Bin Sultan Stadium, Abu Dhabi, United Arab Emirates	Iran	2–2	2–2	2011 WAFF Women's Championship	
