= Lilia Boumrar =

Algerian footballer (born 1988)

Personal information
- Date of birth: 20 October 1988 (age 38)
- Place of birth: Tizi Ghenif, Algeria
- Height: 1.62 m (5 ft 4 in)
- Position: Forward

Senior career*
| Years | Team | Apps | (Gls) |
| 2002–2011 | Bagneux | 72+ | (25+) |
| 2011–2012 | Vendenheim | 20 | (3) |
| 2012–2020 | Saint-Maur | 97 | (32) |

International career^{‡}
| 2006 | Algeria | 3 | (1) |
- * Club domestic league appearances and goals ‡ National team caps and goals as of 3 November 2006.

Lilia Boumrar (Arabic: ليليا بومرار; born 20 October 1988) is an Algerian former footballer who played as a forward. She has been a member of the Algeria women's national team.

== Club career ==
Boumrar has played for Bagneux, FC Vendenheim and Saint-Maur in France.

== International career ==
Boumrar capped for Algeria at senior level during the 2006 African Women's Championship.
