= Leila Meflah =

French–Algerian footballer (born 1982)

Leïla Meflah
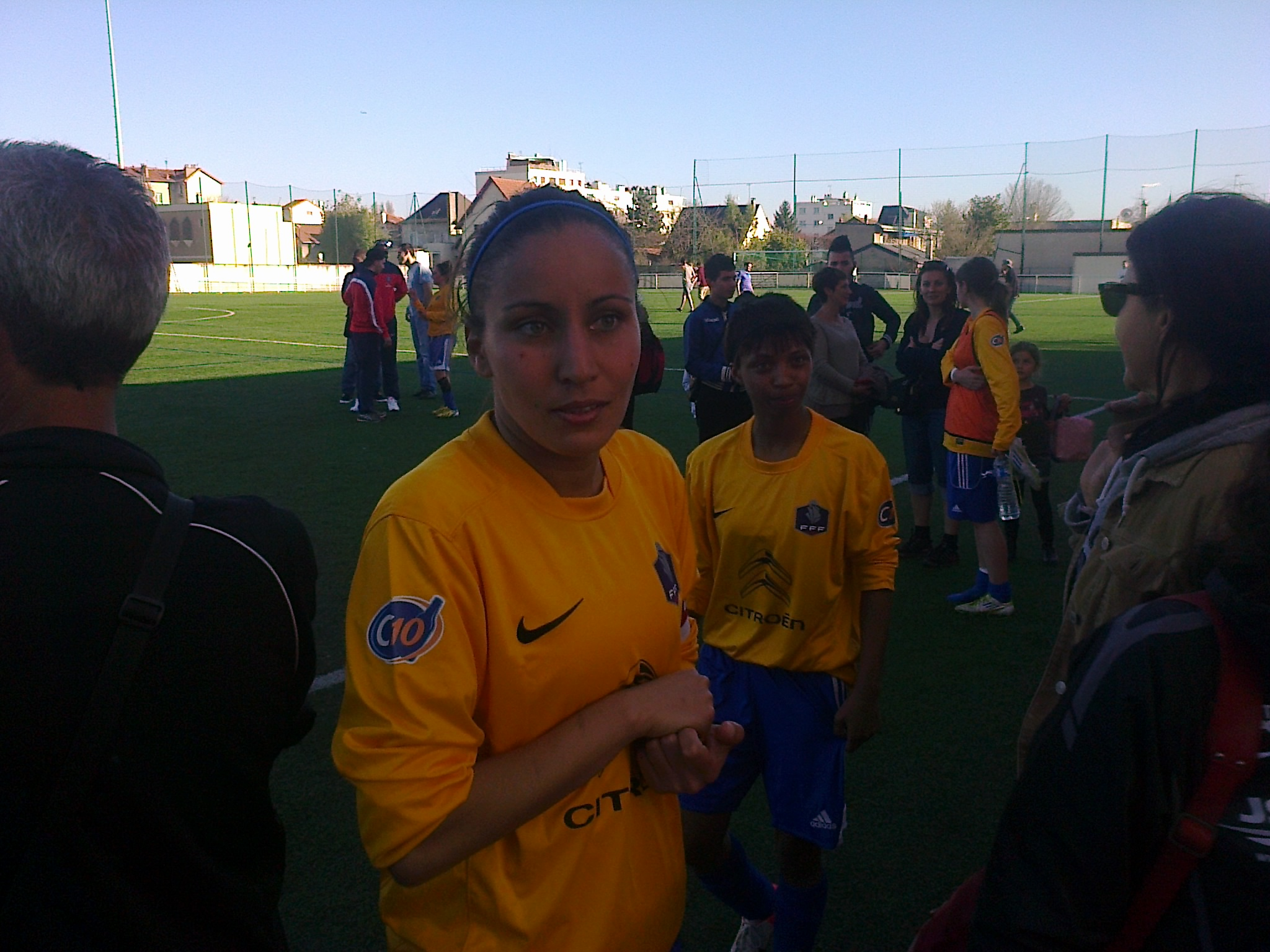

Personal information
- Date of birth: June 9, 1982 (age 44)
- Place of birth: Clamart, France
- Height: 1.69 m (5 ft 7 in)
- Position: Midfielder

Team information
- Current team: Saint-Denis

Senior career*
Years	Team	Apps	(Gls)
2001–2011	Bagneux		
2011–2012	FC Vendenheim		
2012–2016	VGA Saint-Maur		
2018–	Saint-Denis		

International career
- Algeria
- * Club domestic league appearances and goals as of VGA Saint-Maur

Leïla Meflah (born 9 June 1982 Clamart (Hauts-de-Seine)) is an Algerian international footballer. She currently plays as a midfielder for VGA Saint-Maur.

== Football career ==
Meflah trained at COM Bagneux, she began with the first team during the 2002–2003 season. In particular, contesting the D3 finals.

A regular team starter, Meflah played in the D2 competition until 2011, when she joined in the summer the Alsatian club FC Vendenheim promoted to D1 in the offseason.

Having missed the early season because of her participation in the African Games with the Algerian selection, Meflah played in the first division in the Bas-Rhin league, but disputes that are ten matches but consecutively, from the third to the twelfth day.

After one season, Meflah returned to Ile-de-France, in Saint-Maur VGA, then DH.

Meflah participates in the raising of the Val-de-Marne club in D2, with a bonus a course until 1/8 finals Cup de France.

Meflah is currently captain of the VGA.
