= Isma Ouadah =

Algerian footballer (born 1983)

Personal information
- Date of birth: 19 January 1983 (age 43)
- Position: Defender

Team information
- Current team: AS Sûreté Nationale
- Number: 2

International career^{‡}
Years	Team	Apps	(Gls)
2010–	Algeria	3	(0)
- ‡ National team caps and goals as of 20 June 2019

Isma Ouadah (Arabic: أسماء واضح, born 19 January 1983) is an Algerian international footballer who plays as a defender for the Algeria women's national football team. She competed for Algeria at the 2018 Africa Women Cup of Nations, playing in three matches.
