= Béni Khalled =

Coordinates: 36°39′N 10°36′E

Béni Khalled بني خلاد
- Commune and town
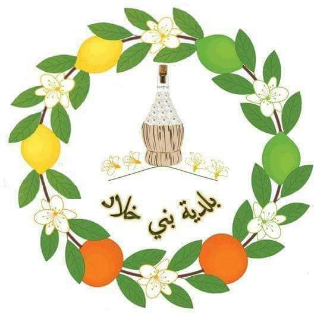
- Seal
- Interactive map of Béni Khalled
- Country: Tunisia
- Governorate: Nabeul Governorate

Population (2014)
  - Total: 23,356
- Time zone: UTC+1 (CET)

Béni Khalled is a town and commune in the west of Nabeul Governorate, Tunisia, about 42 km from the capital Tunis. As of 2004 it had a population of 12,573. Béni Khalled is considered an important agricultural town in the region due to its citrus fruit production; it contributes about 45% of the national export of the fruit. It also produces a high percentage of multiple strategic crops including grapes, potatoes and spices as well as raising livestock, milk production and beekeeping. The municipal area covers around 600 ha.

In 1999, the commune received Presidential Award of "The Cleanest Municipality of Tunisia".

== History ==
The origins of the city of Béni Khalled go back to the Amazighen era, when it had the name "Sholl". It was later influenced by the Punic civilization after the establishment of Carthage; epigraphic texts show the history of the municipal system of the city during the Punic and Roman era. The city acquired the Roman municipal system which especially includes municipal councils and ceremonial.

No mention has been traced of the city of Béni Khalled in old Arabic sources; there is only some information about the Muslim conquest of the Cape Bon.

A short film about the history of Beni Khalled was released by the Virtual Experience Company in 2020, and can be found HERE

== Institutions ==
=== Cultural events and institutions ===
Several cultural events, such as the Spring Festival (held more than 32 times) and the Golden Orange Festival (held for the first time on 14 March 2015), are organized by the city of Béni Khalled.

There are three primary schools, a prep school, a secondary school and a private secondary school.

Other cultural and youth institutions include a library, Youth and Children's Club House, several kindergartens, 20 mosques, and the Quran House.

=== Economic institutions ===
Farming services ARPEL comprise several orange, dates and olive oil roll stations for export. There are six branches of major commercial banks in Tunisia.

== Personalities ==
The notable personalities of Béni Khalled include:

- Amor Chachia, politician
- Hmaida Ben Gacem, expert in economics

== See also ==
- List of cities in Tunisia
