= Imène Merrouche =

Algerian footballer (born 1994)

Personal information
- Full name: Imène Merrouche
- Date of birth: 25 April 1994 (age 32)
- Place of birth: Algeria
- Position: Forward

Team information
- Current team: Al-Amal

Senior career*
Years	Team	Apps	(Gls)
–2023	FC Constantine		
2023–	Al-Amal		

International career
	Algeria	17	(5)
- * Club domestic league appearances and goals

Imène Merrouche (born 25 April 1994) is an Algerian footballer who plays for Saudi club Al-Amal and the Algeria national team.

In 2023, she moved to the Saudi Women's First Division League to play with Al-Amal to contribute to its qualification to the Saudi Women's Premier League.

She played for Algeria at the 2014 African Women's Championship and the 2018 Africa Women Cup of Nations, where she scored for Algeria in the match against Mali.
