= Nabila Imloul =

Algerian footballer (born 1982)

Personal information
- Date of birth: 11 December 1982 (age 43)
- Place of birth: Béjaïa, Algeria
- Position: Forward

Senior career*
Years	Team	Apps	(Gls)
2006	Evasion Bejaia		
2007–2009	Alger Centre		
2010	Bejaia		

International career^{‡}
2006–2010	Algeria	4	(0)
- * Club domestic league appearances and goals ‡ National team caps and goals as of 8 November 2010.

Nabila Imloul (Arabic: نبيلة املول; born 11 December 1982) is an Algerian former footballer who played as a forward. She has been a member of the Algeria women's national team.

== Club career ==
Imloul has played for Evasion Bejaia, ASE Alger Centre and FC Bejaia in Algeria.

== International career ==
Imloul capped for Algeria at senior level during two Africa Women Cup of Nations editions (2006 and 2010).
