= Nachida Laïfa =

Algerian footballer (born 1982)

Personal information
- Date of birth: 17 October 1982 (age 44)
- Place of birth: Algiers, Algeria
- Height: 1.77 m (5 ft 10 in)
- Position: Forward

Senior career*
Years	Team	Apps	(Gls)
1997–2014	Alger Centre		

International career^{‡}
2006–2014	Algeria	6	(0)
- * Club domestic league appearances and goals ‡ National team caps and goals as of 18 October 2014.

Nachida Laïfa (Arabic: نشيدة لعيفة; born 17 October 1982) is an Algerian former footballer who played as a forward. She has been a member of the Algeria women's national team.

== Club career ==
Laïfa has played for ASE Alger Centre in Algeria.

== International career ==
Laïfa capped for Algeria at senior level during two Africa Women Cup of Nations editions (2006 and 2014).
