= Police Academy Stadium =

Football stadium in Cairo, Egypt

Coordinates: 30°04′10″N 31°17′18″E

- Ittihad El Shorta Stadium
- Interactive map of Police Academy Stadium
- Former names: Abbassia Stadium
- Location: Cairo, Egypt
- Owner: Ittihad El Shorta
- Capacity: 12,000
- Surface: Grass

Tenants
- Ittihad El Shorta; El Dakhleya

Police Academy Stadium (Egyptian Arabic: ستاد كلية الشرطة) is a football stadium in Abbassia, Cairo, Egypt. It is the home stadium for Ittihad El Shorta and for El Dakhleya since the 2017–18 season.
