= Zéralda Stadium =

Stade Zéralda
- Interactive map of Stade Zéralda
- Full name: Stade Zéralda
- Location: Zéralda, Algiers
- Coordinates: 36°42′39″N 2°50′6″E
- Capacity: 3000
- Surface: Artificial turf

Stade Zéralda is a multi-purpose stadium in Zéralda, Algeria. The stadium was used as one of the two venues for the 2009 African U-17 Championship. The stadium can hold up to 3000 people.
