= 2026 Women's Africa Cup of Nations squads =

Football tournament squads

The 2026 Women's Africa Cup of Nations was an international women's association football tournament held in Morocco from 26 July to 16 August 2026. The 16 national teams involved in the tournament were required to register a squad of 24 to 26 players, including three goalkeepers. Only players in these squads were eligible to take part in the tournament.

The age listed for each player is as of 26 July 2026, the first day of the tournament. The club listed is the club for which the player last played a competitive match prior to the tournament. A flag is included for coaches who are of a different nationality than their own national team.

Note: All player datas are sourced from the official CAF squad lists. Club listings correspond to the official registration data provided by CAF and may not reflect recent player transfers prior to the tournament.

== Group A ==
=== Morocco ===
Head coach: (Spain) Jorge Vilda

Morocco announced their final 26-player squad on 17 July.

No.	Pos.	Player	Date of birth (age)	Club
1	GK	Khadija Er-Rmichi	16 September 1989 (aged 36)	(Royal Moroccan Football Federation) AS FAR
2	DF	Zineb Redouani	12 June 2000 (aged 26)	(Royal Moroccan Football Federation) AS FAR
3	DF	Nouhaila Benzina	11 May 1998 (aged 28)	(Royal Moroccan Football Federation) AS FAR
4	DF	Siham Boukhami	1 February 1992 (aged 34)	(Royal Moroccan Football Federation) AS FAR
5	DF	Nesryne El Chad	13 March 2003 (aged 23)	(French Football Federation) Lille
6	MF	Élodie Nakkach	20 January 1995 (aged 31)	(Swiss Football Association) Servette
7	MF	Ghizlane Chebbak (captain)	22 February 1990 (aged 36)	(Saudi Arabian Football Federation) Al-Hilal
8	FW	Kenza Chapelle	22 August 2002 (aged 23)	(French Football Federation) Le Mans
9	FW	Ibtissam Jraïdi	9 December 1992 (aged 33)	(Saudi Arabian Football Federation) Al-Ahli
10	MF	Najat Badri	19 May 1988 (aged 38)	(Royal Moroccan Football Federation) AS FAR
11	FW	Fatima Tagnaout	20 January 1999 (aged 27)	(Royal Moroccan Football Federation) AS FAR
12	GK	Fatima Zahra El Jebraoui	8 August 2007 (aged 18)	(Royal Moroccan Football Federation) SC Casablanca
13	FW	Chaymaa Mourtaji	8 December 1995 (aged 30)	(Royal Moroccan Football Federation) Union Touarga
14	DF	Aziza Rabbah	4 July 1986 (aged 40)	(Royal Moroccan Football Federation) AS FAR
15	MF	Hajar Saïd	22 May 2005 (aged 21)	(French Football Federation) Paris FC
16	DF	Maryame Atiq	24 January 1998 (aged 28)	(Royal Moroccan Football Federation) FUS Rabat
17	DF	Hanane Aït El Haj	2 November 1994 (aged 31)	(Royal Spanish Football Federation) Alavés
18	FW	Sanaâ Mssoudy	30 December 1999 (aged 26)	(Royal Moroccan Football Federation) AS FAR
19	FW	Sakina Ouzraoui Diki	29 August 2001 (aged 24)	(Royal Spanish Football Federation) Tenerife
20	FW	Imane Saoud	6 June 2002 (aged 24)	(French Football Federation) Nantes
21	MF	Yasmin Mrabet	8 August 1999 (aged 26)	(Royal Spanish Football Federation) Valencia
22	GK	Inès Arouaissa	30 June 2001 (aged 25)	(French Football Federation) Saint-Malo
23	FW	Jade Nassi	26 April 2003 (aged 23)	(French Football Federation) Le Havre
24	MF	Soumia Hady	30 June 1998 (aged 28)	(Royal Moroccan Football Federation) RS Berkane
25	DF	Rania Boutiebi	4 March 2004 (aged 22)	(Royal Belgian Football Association) Club YLA
26	FW	Kautar Azraf	3 January 2008 (aged 18)	(Royal Spanish Football Federation) Barcelona

=== Algeria ===
Head coach: (France) Farid Benstiti

Algeria announced their final 26-player squad on 5 July.

No.	Pos.	Player	Date of birth (age)	Club
1	GK	Amina Haleyi	10 September 1992 (aged 33)	(Algerian Football Federation) JS Kabylie
2	DF	Mélinne D'Oria	7 August 2001 (aged 24)	(French Football Federation) Le Mans
3	DF	Sofia Guellati (captain)	9 July 1992 (aged 34)	(French Football Federation) Lens
4	DF	Roselène Khezami	2 September 2001 (aged 24)	(French Football Federation) Marseille
5	DF	Wassila Alouache	11 July 2000 (aged 26)	(Algerian Football Federation) CF Akbou
6	MF	Mélissa Bethi	18 November 2005 (aged 20)	(French Football Federation) Nantes
7	DF	Morgane Belkhiter	23 November 1995 (aged 30)	(French Football Federation) Saint-Étienne
8	MF	Wissem Bouzid	18 December 2002 (aged 23)	(French Football Federation) Lille
9	FW	Laura Taleb Muller	9 January 1999 (aged 27)	(Swiss Football Association) Sion
10	FW	Khouloud Ournani	23 July 2003 (aged 23)	(Algerian Football Federation) CF Akbou
11	FW	Lina Boussaha	16 January 1999 (aged 27)	(Saudi Arabian Football Federation) Al-Ittihad
12	FW	Ikram Adjabi	23 May 1998 (aged 28)	(French Football Federation) Le Havre
13	FW	Lynda Bendris	25 July 2004 (aged 22)	(French Football Federation) Cannes
14	FW	Inès Boutaleb	8 November 1998 (aged 27)	(French Football Federation) Auxerre
15	FW	Inès Khiri	28 March 1999 (aged 27)	(Swiss Football Association) Yverdon
16	GK	Chloé N'Gazi	6 June 1996 (aged 30)	(French Football Federation) Montpellier
17	DF	Inès Belloumou	21 June 2001 (aged 25)	(The Football Association) West Ham United
18	MF	Sofia Bekhaled	20 October 2006 (aged 19)	(French Football Federation) Lyon
19	FW	Morgane Ikene	13 January 1999 (aged 27)	(French Football Federation) Saint-Malo
20	MF	Amira Ould Braham	17 February 1998 (aged 28)	(Turkish Football Federation) Trabzonspor
21	MF	Marine Dafeur	20 October 1994 (aged 31)	(The Football Association) Bristol City
22	DF	Lana Smits Ouraghi	24 January 2005 (aged 21)	(French Football Federation) Reims
23	GK	Amira Benaïssa	26 July 2007 (aged 19)	(French Football Federation) Fleury
24	FW	Nihed Naili	11 April 2001 (aged 25)	(French Football Federation) Cannes
25	DF	Léa Abadou	12 March 1997 (aged 29)	(Swiss Football Association) Sion
26	MF	Aïcha Hamidèche	2 October 2001 (aged 24)	(Turkish Football Federation) Beşiktaş

=== Senegal ===
Head coach: Mame Moussa Cissé

Senegal announced their final 26-player squad on 20 July 2026.

No.	Pos.	Player	Date of birth (age)	Club
1	GK	Tenning Sène	21 January 1990 (aged 36)	(Senegalese Football Federation) Jappo Olympique
2	DF	Marème Babou	13 April 2003 (aged 23)	(French Football Federation) Lens
3	DF	Anta Dembélé	15 June 1994 (aged 32)	(Senegalese Football Federation) Aigles de la Médina
4	DF	Aïssatou Fall	1 December 2007 (aged 18)	(Senegalese Football Federation) Aigles de la Médina
5	DF	Wolimata Ndiaye	10 January 2004 (aged 22)	(Royal Moroccan Football Federation) Wydad Casablanca
6	FW	Seynabou Mbengue	15 March 1992 (aged 34)	(French Football Federation) Metz
7	FW	Mama Diop	9 October 1994 (aged 31)	(French Football Federation) Saint-Malo
8	DF	Mbayang Sow	21 January 1993 (aged 33)	(Senegalese Football Federation) Aigles de la Médina
9	FW	Nguenar Ndiaye	10 January 1995 (aged 31)	(French Football Federation) Bourges
10	MF	Ndeye Awa Diakhaté	2 January 1997 (aged 29)	(Saudi Arabian Football Federation) Al-Yarmouk
11	MF	Mariama Faty	10 January 2009 (aged 17)	(Senegalese Football Federation) Kumaré Sédhiou
12	MF	Safietou Sagna	11 April 1994 (aged 32)	(French Football Federation) Saint-Denis
13	DF	Adama Sané	8 March 2005 (aged 21)	(Royal Moroccan Football Federation) Wydad Casablanca
14	MF	Sadigatou Diallo	21 February 2003 (aged 23)	(Senegalese Football Federation) Aigles de la Médina
15	MF	Fatoumata Dramé	28 March 2001 (aged 25)	(Senegalese Football Federation) Aigles de la Médina
16	GK	Khady Faye	14 January 2004 (aged 22)	(Senegalese Football Federation) Aigles de la Médina
17	FW	Khadija Badio	28 May 2006 (aged 20)	(Football Association of Slovenia) Radomlje
18	DF	Meta Kandé	26 March 2002 (aged 24)	(Saudi Arabian Football Federation) Al-Hmmah
19	MF	Bineta Korkel Seck	11 January 1998 (aged 28)	(French Football Federation) Caen
20	MF	Korka Fall (captain)	19 February 1990 (aged 36)	(French Football Federation) Caen
21	FW	Ndèye Awa Casset	12 November 2003 (aged 22)	(Senegalese Football Federation) Aigles de la Médina
22	FW	Pascaline Fofana Bassène	21 December 2002 (aged 23)	(Royal Spanish Football Federation) SE AEM
23	GK	Adji Ndiaye	4 August 2006 (aged 19)	(French Football Federation) Bourges
24	MF	Dieynaba Ndaw	10 April 2003 (aged 23)	(Royal Spanish Football Federation) CP Cacereño
25	DF	Mbène Diop	3 April 2010 (aged 16)	(Senegalese Football Federation) Dakar Sacré-Cœur
26	MF	Sokhna Nogaye Pène	11 November 2006 (aged 19)	(Senegalese Football Federation) AS Bambey

=== Kenya ===
Head coach: Beldine Odemba

Kenya announced a preliminary 29-player squad on 25 June. They announced their final 24-player squad on 21 July.

No.	Pos.	Player	Date of birth (age)	Club
1	GK	Vivian Shiyonzo	13 August 2002 (aged 23)	(Football Kenya Federation) Kibera
2	MF	Mwanalima Adam Jereko (captain)	4 September 1997 (aged 28)	(Danish Football Association) HB Køge
3	DF	Vivian Nasaka	19 December 1999 (aged 26)	(Turkish Football Federation) Hakkarigücü Spor
4	DF	Mary Nthambi	22 January 1999 (aged 27)	(Football Kenya Federation) Kenya Police Bullets
5	DF	Leah Andiema	14 April 1998 (aged 28)	(Football Kenya Federation) Kenya Police Bullets
6	MF	Lorna Nyarinda	13 October 2000 (aged 25)	(Football Kenya Federation) Kenya Police Bullets
7	FW	Shalyne Opisa	27 August 2004 (aged 21)	(Federation of Uganda Football Associations) Amus College
8	MF	Martha Amunyolet	5 January 2000 (aged 26)	(Football Kenya Federation) Vihiga Queens
9	MF	Tereza Engesha	15 December 1998 (aged 27)	(Football Kenya Federation) Kenya Police Bullets
10	FW	Marion Serenge	3 November 2007 (aged 18)	(Federation of Uganda Football Associations) St. Noa Girls
11	DF	Norah Ann	14 September 2002 (aged 23)	(Football Kenya Federation) Kenya Police Bullets
12	MF	Mercy Airo	20 October 1999 (aged 26)	(Football Kenya Federation) Ulinzi Starlets
13	DF	Elizabeth Ochaka	9 June 2009 (aged 17)	(Football Kenya Federation) Kenya Police Bullets
14	MF	Shaline Nambengele	11 November 2005 (aged 20)	(Football Kenya Federation) Ulinzi Starlets
15	FW	Valerie Nekesa	24 July 2007 (aged 19)	(Football Kenya Federation) Madira
16	MF	Airine Madalina	17 December 2000 (aged 25)	(Football Kenya Federation) Vihiga Queens
17	FW	Eglay Mukhwana	14 July 2004 (aged 22)	(Football Kenya Federation) Trinity Starlets
18	GK	Annette Kundu	17 December 1996 (aged 29)	(Football Kenya Federation) Kenya Police Bullets
19	FW	Violet Wanyonyi	20 January 2000 (aged 26)	(Saudi Arabian Football Federation) United Eagles
20	DF	Ruth Ingosi	19 December 1993 (aged 32)	(Tanzania Football Federation) Simba Queens
21	MF	Fasila Adhiambo	6 January 2006 (aged 20)	(Tanzania Football Federation) Simba Queens
22	DF	Euphrasier Shilwatso	1 July 2003 (aged 23)	(Football Kenya Federation) Kayole Starlets
23	GK	Lilian Awuor	13 June 1999 (aged 27)	(Romanian Football Federation) Farul Constanța
24	DF	Enez Mango	1 July 1993 (aged 33)	(Romanian Football Federation) Farul Constanța

== Group B ==
=== South Africa ===
Head coach: Desiree Ellis

South Africa announced a preliminary 31-player squad on 6 July. They announced their final 26-player squad on 17 July.

No.	Pos.	Player	Date of birth (age)	Club
1	GK	Kaylin Swart	30 September 1994 (aged 31)	(South African Football Association) JVW
2	DF	Lebogang Ramalepe	3 December 1991 (aged 34)	(South African Football Association) Mamelodi Sundowns
3	MF	Bongeka Gamede	22 May 1999 (aged 27)	(Danish Football Association) Nordsjælland
4	DF	Lonathemba Mhlongo	23 August 2002 (aged 23)	(South African Football Association) University of the Western Cape
5	DF	Fikile Magama	19 January 2002 (aged 24)	(South African Football Association) University of the Western Cape
6	MF	Noxolo Cesane	11 October 2000 (aged 25)	(South African Football Association) Mamelodi Sundowns
7	DF	Karabo Dhlamini	18 September 2001 (aged 24)	(South African Football Association) Mamelodi Sundowns
8	FW	Hildah Magaia	16 December 1994 (aged 31)	(Royal Spanish Football Federation) Deportivo ABANCA
9	MF	Gabriela Salgado	20 February 1998 (aged 28)	(South African Football Association) JVW
10	MF	Linda Motlhalo	1 July 1998 (aged 28)	(Scottish Football Association) Glasgow City
11	FW	Thembi Kgatlana	2 May 1996 (aged 30)	(Mexican Football Federation) Tigres UANL
12	DF	Asanda Hadebe	13 October 2003 (aged 22)	(South African Football Association) Mamelodi Sundowns
13	DF	Bambanani Mbane	12 March 1990 (aged 36)	(South African Football Association) Mamelodi Sundowns
14	MF	Nonhlanhla Mthandi	19 August 1995 (aged 30)	(South African Football Association) Mamelodi Sundowns
15	MF	Refiloe Jane (captain)	4 August 1992 (aged 33)	(South African Football Association) TS Galaxy
16	GK	Andile Dlamini	2 September 1992 (aged 33)	(South African Football Association) Mamelodi Sundowns
17	FW	Ronnel Donnelly	31 March 2004 (aged 22)	(South African Football Association) Mamelodi Sundowns
18	MF	Sibulele Holweni	28 April 2001 (aged 25)	(South African Football Association) University of the Western Cape
19	MF	Isabella Ludwig	13 December 2002 (aged 23)	(South African Football Association) Mamelodi Sundowns
20	MF	Robyn Moodaly	16 June 1994 (aged 32)	(South African Football Association) JVW
21	GK	Kebotseng Moletsane	3 March 1995 (aged 31)	(South African Football Association) University of Fort Hare
22	MF	Amogelang Motau	27 February 1997 (aged 29)	(Mexican Football Federation) Tijuana
23	FW	Nthabiseng Majiya	10 June 2004 (aged 22)	(South African Football Association) Mamelodi Sundowns
24	DF	Antonia Maponya	17 October 1999 (aged 26)	(South African Football Association) University of the Western Cape
25	DF	Khutso Pila	31 May 2000 (aged 26)	(South African Football Association) Mamelodi Sundowns
26	FW	Zoë October	16 June 2008 (aged 18)	(South African Football Association) University of the Western Cape

=== Côte d'Ivoire ===
Head coach: (France) Reynald Pedros

Côte d'Ivoire announced their final 28-player squad on 12 July. In alignment with the CAF 26-player limit, Salimata Ballo and Yabré Bimanta were omitted from the official list.

No.	Pos.	Player	Date of birth (age)	Club
1	GK	Aramatou Diakité	23 July 2001 (aged 25)	(Ivorian Football Federation) AS AGIR
2	DF	Ada Daple	12 November 1999 (aged 26)	(Italian Football Federation) San Marino Academy
3	DF	Aboa Yapo	21 June 2002 (aged 24)	(Ivorian Football Federation) ASEC Mimosas
4	FW	Anne Huviezo	1 July 2000 (aged 26)	(Ivorian Football Federation) ASEC Mimosas
5	DF	Mariam Diakité	11 April 1995 (aged 31)	(Turkish Football Federation) Fenerbahçe
6	MF	Bernadette Kakounan	4 September 1997 (aged 28)	(German Football Association) Bayern Munich
7	MF	Melissa Behinan	25 May 2003 (aged 23)	(Turkish Football Federation) Amed
8	MF	Sylviane Kokora	12 July 1995 (aged 31)	(Royal Moroccan Football Federation) SC Casablanca
9	FW	Priscille Kreto	5 August 1997 (aged 28)	(Kazakhstan Football Federation) BIIK Shymkent
10	MF	Rebecca Elloh	25 December 1994 (aged 31)	(Royal Spanish Football Federation) Valencia
11	FW	N'Sira Ouédraogo	21 April 2008 (aged 18)	(Danish Football Association) Nordsjælland
12	MF	Rosemonde Kouassi	26 December 2001 (aged 24)	(United States Soccer Federation) Washington Spirit
13	MF	Yeti Doudou Touré	16 May 2003 (aged 23)	(Ivorian Football Federation) ASEC Mimosas
14	FW	Ami Diallo	2 October 2000 (aged 25)	(Ivorian Football Federation) ASEC Mimosas
15	DF	Anastasie Gbéhi	30 December 2002 (aged 23)	(Ivorian Football Federation) ASEC Mimosas
16	GK	Océane Lamfir	15 October 2007 (aged 18)	(Ivorian Football Federation) Stella Club
17	MF	Ange N'Guessan	18 November 1990 (aged 35)	(Royal Spanish Football Federation) Tenerife
18	MF	Frédérique Abrogoua	17 July 2001 (aged 25)	(French Football Federation) Nice
19	FW	Inès Konan	8 January 2002 (aged 24)	(French Football Federation) Strasbourg
20	DF	Matoba Cissé	26 March 1997 (aged 29)	(Tanzania Football Federation) Tausi
21	MF	Essi Dagba	21 September 2003 (aged 22)	(Ivorian Football Federation) ASEC Mimosas
22	MF	Erika Gnounoué	20 January 2000 (aged 26)	(Ivorian Football Federation) ASEC Mimosas
23	GK	Leslie Amani	8 February 1998 (aged 28)	(Ivorian Football Federation) FC Mouna
24	DF	Mariam Diawara	15 April 2004 (aged 22)	(Ivorian Football Federation) ASEC Mimosas
25	DF	Aïcha Fofana	6 October 2000 (aged 25)	(Ivorian Football Federation) ASEC Mimosas
26	MF	Ruth Sery	6 February 2008 (aged 18)	(Danish Football Association) Nordsjælland

=== Burkina Faso ===
Head coach: Pascal Sawadogo

Burkina Faso announced their final 28-player squad on 16 July. In alignment with the CAF 26-player limit, Alima Kouda and Lehna Taoko were omitted from the final

No.	Pos.	Player	Date of birth (age)	Club
1	GK	Faoziatou Ouédraogo	17 September 2004 (aged 21)	(Burkinabé Football Federation) Etincelles
2	DF	Madina Traoré	16 August 2001 (aged 24)	(Royal Moroccan Football Federation) HA Nador
3	DF	Stéphanie Sow	2 November 1995 (aged 30)	(Burkinabé Football Federation) USFA
4	FW	Diamilatou Zongo	20 June 2001 (aged 25)	(Burkinabé Football Federation) Bobo Dioulasso
5	DF	Stéphanie Zida	29 November 2001 (aged 24)	(Burkinabé Football Federation) USFA
6	FW	Adama Congo	11 April 2004 (aged 22)	(Royal Spanish Football Federation) SE AEM
7	FW	Mouniratou Compaoré	26 November 1997 (aged 28)	(Saudi Arabian Football Federation) Al-Yarmouk
8	MF	Félicité Kafando	17 June 1996 (aged 30)	(Burkinabé Football Federation) Etincelles
9	MF	Alimata Bélem	2 September 2004 (aged 21)	(Royal Spanish Football Federation) Eibar
10	FW	Rasmata Sawadogo	1 January 2003 (aged 23)	(Turkish Football Federation) Hakkarigücü Spor
11	FW	Balkissa Sawadogo	2 October 1998 (aged 27)	(Saudi Arabian Football Federation) Al-Yarmouk
12	DF	Charlotte Millogo	14 July 1998 (aged 28)	(Burkinabé Football Federation) USFA
13	MF	Élodie Goungounga	24 March 2000 (aged 26)	(Burkinabé Football Federation) USFA
14	DF	Madinatou Rouamba	1 December 2001 (aged 24)	(Turkish Football Federation) Trabzonspor
15	MF	Adèle Kabré	30 December 2004 (aged 21)	(Chinese Football Association) Liaoning Shenbei Hefeng
16	GK	Nina Dabilgou	14 January 1996 (aged 30)	(Ivorian Football Federation) ASEC Mimosas
17	MF	Gloria Zongo	11 May 2007 (aged 19)	(Burkinabé Football Federation) Etincelles
18	FW	Juliette Nana	16 August 2000 (aged 25)	(Turkish Football Federation) Giresunspor
19	MF	Deborah Guira	6 September 2008 (aged 17)	(Burkinabé Football Federation) Etincelles
20	MF	Rabiatou Koudougou	19 April 2004 (aged 22)	(Burkinabé Football Federation) USFA
21	FW	Faridatou Tarnagda	14 September 1998 (aged 27)	(Burkinabé Football Federation) Etincelles
22	DF	Safiatou Sam	13 April 2002 (aged 24)	(Burkinabé Football Federation) Etincelles
23	GK	Aminata Korogo	28 October 1999 (aged 26)	(Burkinabé Football Federation) ASO
24	DF	Assanatou Nako	27 April 1998 (aged 28)	(Burkinabé Football Federation) USFA
25	DF	Eden Soulier	11 May 2005 (aged 21)	(Canadian Soccer Association) CS Saint-Laurent
26	MF	Judicaël Ouoba	15 December 2001 (aged 24)	(Tanzania Football Federation) Tausi

=== Tanzania ===
Head coach: Bakari Shime

No.	Pos.	Player	Date of birth (age)	Club
1	GK	Nusra Jafari	20 December 2010 (aged 15)	(Tanzania Football Federation) Fountain Gate Princess
2	DF	Anastazia Katunzi	29 January 1996 (aged 30)	(Tanzania Football Federation) JKT Queens
3	FW	Hasnath Ubamba	8 July 2006 (aged 20)	(Royal Spanish Football Federation) Madrid CFF
4	DF	Edina Makamba	5 December 2008 (aged 17)	(Tanzania Football Federation) Tausi
5	MF	Fatuma Issa Maonyo	6 April 1995 (aged 31)	(Tanzania Football Federation) Simba Queens
6	MF	Donisia Minja	9 August 1996 (aged 29)	(Tanzania Football Federation) JKT Queens
7	FW	Opah Clement (captain)	14 February 2001 (aged 25)	(Royal Spanish Football Federation) Eibar
8	MF	Stumai Athumani	25 August 1997 (aged 28)	(Tanzania Football Federation) JKT Queens
9	FW	Aisha Mnunka	26 July 2005 (aged 21)	(Tanzania Football Federation) Simba Queens
10	MF	Mary Siyame	25 October 2008 (aged 17)	(Tanzania Football Federation) Fountain Gate Princess
11	MF	Diana Msewa	13 November 2001 (aged 24)	(Turkish Football Federation) Trabzonspor
12	FW	Asha Omary	5 May 2009 (aged 17)	(Tanzania Football Federation) Simba Queens
13	MF	Alia Fikiri	1 September 2006 (aged 19)	(Tanzania Football Federation) JKT Queens
14	FW	Asha Rashid Mlangwa	12 January 1991 (aged 35)	(Tanzania Football Federation) JKT Queens
15	DF	Julitha Singano	8 February 2001 (aged 25)	(Saudi Arabian Football Federation) Al-Nassr
16	DF	Ester Maseke	3 June 2008 (aged 18)	(Tanzania Football Federation) JKT Queens
17	FW	Enekia Lunyamila	20 April 2002 (aged 24)	(Mexican Football Federation) Querétaro
18	GK	Najiat Abbas	2 April 1997 (aged 29)	(Tanzania Football Federation) JKT Queens
19	MF	Elizabeth Chenge	25 July 2011 (aged 15)	(Tanzania Football Federation) JKT Queens
20	GK	Janeth Shija	5 November 2003 (aged 22)	(Tanzania Football Federation) Simba Queens
21	DF	Violeth Nicholaus	9 February 2005 (aged 21)	(Egyptian Football Association) Palm Hills
22	DF	Diana Mnally	11 September 2006 (aged 19)	(Tanzania Football Federation) Yanga Princess
23	DF	Ester Mabanza	13 March 2003 (aged 23)	(Tanzania Football Federation) Yanga Princess
24	FW	Bahati Steven	24 December 2010 (aged 15)	(Tanzania Football Federation) Bunda Queens
25	MF	Winfrida Charles	20 October 2008 (aged 17)	(Tanzania Football Federation) Fountain Gate Princess
26	DF	Noela Patrick Luhala	25 December 2005 (aged 20)	(Lithuanian Football Federation) Žalgiris

== Group C ==
=== Nigeria ===
Head coach: Justine Madugu

Nigeria announced their final 25-player squad on 10 July.

No.	Pos.	Player	Date of birth (age)	Club
1	GK	Fatima Oloko	2 February 2008 (aged 18)	(Nigeria Football Federation) Abia Angels
2	FW	Rinsola Babajide	17 June 1998 (aged 28)	(Italian Football Federation) Roma
3	DF	Osinachi Ohale	21 December 1991 (aged 34)	(Mexican Football Federation) Pachuca
4	DF	Glory Ogbonna	25 December 1998 (aged 27)	(Israel Football Association) Kiryat Gat
5	FW	Joy Omewa	1 December 2002 (aged 23)	(The Football Association) Nottingham Forest
6	FW	Esther Okoronkwo	22 March 1997 (aged 29)	(Canadian Soccer Association) AFC Toronto
7	MF	Toni Payne	22 April 1995 (aged 31)	(Italian Football Federation) Inter Milan
8	FW	Asisat Oshoala	9 October 1994 (aged 31)	(Saudi Arabian Football Federation) Al-Hilal
9	FW	Folashade Ijamilusi	30 May 2001 (aged 25)	(Chinese Football Association) Liaoning Shenbei Hefeng
10	MF	Christy Ucheibe	25 December 2000 (aged 25)	(Portuguese Football Federation) Benfica
11	MF	Jennifer Echegini	22 March 2001 (aged 25)	(French Football Federation) Paris Saint-Germain
12	FW	Uchenna Kanu	20 June 1997 (aged 29)	(Mexican Football Federation) Cruz Azul
13	MF	Deborah Abiodun	2 November 2003 (aged 22)	(United States Soccer Federation) Washington Spirit
14	DF	Oluwatosin Demehin	13 March 2002 (aged 24)	(Turkish Football Federation) Galatasaray
15	MF	Rasheedat Ajibade (captain)	7 December 1999 (aged 26)	(French Football Federation) Paris Saint-Germain
16	GK	Chiamaka Nnadozie	8 December 2000 (aged 25)	(The Football Association) Brighton & Hove Albion
17	FW	Francisca Ordega	19 October 1993 (aged 32)	(Saudi Arabian Football Federation) Al-Ittihad
18	MF	Halimatu Ayinde	16 May 1995 (aged 31)	(Swedish Football Association) BK Häcken
19	FW	Chinwendu Ihezuo	30 April 1997 (aged 29)	(Mexican Football Federation) Pachuca
20	FW	Gift Monday	9 December 2001 (aged 24)	(United States Soccer Federation) Washington Spirit
21	DF	Rofiat Imuran	17 June 2004 (aged 22)	(The Football Association) London City Lionesses
22	DF	Michelle Alozie	28 April 1997 (aged 29)	(United States Soccer Federation) Chicago Stars
23	GK	Comfort Erhabor	26 April 2005 (aged 21)	(The Football Association) Portsmouth
24	DF	Shukurat Oladipo	22 September 2004 (aged 21)	(Italian Football Federation) Roma
25	MF	Sikiratu Isa	10 July 1997 (aged 29)	(Israel Football Association) Bnot Netanya

=== Zambia ===
Head coach: (Switzerland) Nora Häuptle

Zambia announced a preliminary 26-player squad on 13 July.

No.	Pos.	Player	Date of birth (age)	Club
1	GK	Catherine Musonda	20 February 1998 (aged 28)	(Football Association of Zambia) Red Arrows
2	DF	Saliya Mwanza	16 May 2007 (aged 19)	(Football Association of Zambia) Elite Ladies
3	DF	Lushomo Mweemba	10 April 2001 (aged 25)	(Turkish Football Federation) Hakkarigücü Spor
4	MF	Susan Banda	6 July 1990 (aged 36)	(Football Association of Zambia) Red Arrows
5	DF	Margaret Gondwe	1 December 2007 (aged 18)	(Football Association of Zambia) Green Buffaloes
6	MF	Rhoda Chileshe	8 May 1998 (aged 28)	(Football Association of Zambia) Indeni Roses F.C.
7	FW	Ochumba Lubandji	1 July 2001 (aged 25)	(Chinese Football Association) Fujian Quanzhou Nan'an
8	DF	Margaret Belemu	24 February 1997 (aged 29)	(Football Association of Zambia) Red Arrows
9	FW	Kabange Mupopo	21 September 1992 (aged 33)	(Chinese Football Association) Liaoning Shenbei Hefeng
10	MF	Grace Chanda	11 June 1997 (aged 29)	(Mexican Football Federation) Querétaro
11	FW	Barbra Banda (captain)	20 March 2000 (aged 26)	(United States Soccer Federation) Orlando Pride
12	MF	Evarine Katongo	29 December 2002 (aged 23)	(Israel Football Association) Hapoel Ra'anana
13	DF	Martha Tembo	8 March 1998 (aged 28)	(Israel Football Association) Hapoel Ra'anana
14	MF	Ireen Lungu	6 October 1997 (aged 28)	(Chinese Football Association) Sichuan
15	MF	Hellen Chanda	19 June 1998 (aged 28)	(Saudi Arabian Football Federation) Eastern Flames
16	GK	Hazel Nali	4 April 1998 (aged 28)	(Football Association of Zambia) ZESCO Ndola Girls
17	FW	Racheal Kundananji	3 June 2000 (aged 26)	(United States Soccer Federation) Bay FC
18	GK	Mwila Mufunte	7 September 2007 (aged 18)	(Football Association of Zambia) Green Buffaloes
19	DF	Siomala Mapepa	4 June 2002 (aged 24)	(Saudi Arabian Football Federation) Al-Taraji
20	DF	Racheal Nachula	14 January 1986 (aged 40)	(Football Association of Zambia) Green Buffaloes
21	MF	Avell Chitundu	30 June 1997 (aged 29)	(Football Association of Zambia) ZESCO Ndola Girls
22	FW	Eneless Phiri	2 June 2003 (aged 23)	(Football Association of Zambia) ZESCO Ndola Girls
23	DF	Blessing Maluba	26 March 2007 (aged 19)	(Football Association of Zambia) Nchanga Queens
24	FW	Mercy Chipasula	23 March 2008 (aged 18)	(Football Association of Zambia) ZESCO Ndola Girls
25	FW	Prisca Chilufya	8 June 1999 (aged 27)	(United States Soccer Federation) Angel City
26	FW	Fridah Mukoma	13 October 2006 (aged 19)	(Chinese Football Association) Beijing Jingtan

=== Egypt ===
Head coach: Mohamed Kamal

Egypt announced a preliminary 29-player squad on 2 July.

No.	Pos.	Player	Date of birth (age)	Club
1	GK	Maha Shehata (captain)	13 February 1989 (aged 37)	(Egyptian Football Association) Al Ahly
2	DF	Camélia El-Hofy	16 March 2007 (aged 19)	(Royal Moroccan Football Federation) Wydad Casablanca
3	DF	Nour Abdelwahed	4 April 2004 (aged 22)	(Egyptian Football Association) FC Masar
4	DF	Noura Khaled	12 December 2004 (aged 21)	(Egyptian Football Association) Al Ahly
5	DF	Thouria Ashraf	11 November 1997 (aged 28)	(Egyptian Football Association) Al Ahly
6	DF	Nada Emad	8 January 2001 (aged 25)	(Egyptian Football Association) FC Masar
7	MF	Nadine Ghazi	24 November 2001 (aged 24)	(Egyptian Football Association) Al Ahly
8	DF	Amira Mohammed	23 April 2003 (aged 23)	(Egyptian Football Association) FC Masar
9	FW	Farah El-Mahdy	30 May 2007 (aged 19)	(Egyptian Football Association) FC Masar
10	FW	Sarah Essam	6 April 1999 (aged 27)	(The Football Association) Hull City
11	MF	Menna Tarek	1 March 1999 (aged 27)	(Egyptian Football Association) Al Ahly
12	DF	Eman Hassan	6 November 2000 (aged 25)	(Egyptian Football Association) Al Ahly
13	FW	Leia Khairy	13 June 2004 (aged 22)	(Canadian Soccer Association) Mont-Royal Outremont
14	MF	Camilla Abouseif	27 August 2008 (aged 17)	(Egyptian Football Association) Palm Hills
15	DF	Christina Salama	6 June 2006 (aged 20)	(United States Soccer Federation) West Virginia Mountaineers
16	GK	Farah Samir	2 July 2001 (aged 25)	(Egyptian Football Association) Wadi Degla
17	DF	Habiba Biktash	1 March 2007 (aged 19)	(Egyptian Football Association) FC Masar
18	MF	Habiba Essam	20 March 2007 (aged 19)	(Egyptian Football Association) Al Ahly
19	MF	Yassmin Abdelaziz	2 February 2002 (aged 24)	(Egyptian Football Association) FC Masar
20	DF	Sienna Church	11 November 2007 (aged 18)	(United States Soccer Federation) UT Rio Grande Valley Vaqueros
21	MF	Dana Nadda	14 November 2004 (aged 21)	(United States Soccer Federation) Southern Illinois Salukis
22	MF	Mahira Ali	1 November 1997 (aged 28)	(Chinese Football Association) Beijing Jingtan
23	GK	Habiba Emad	8 January 2006 (aged 20)	(Egyptian Football Association) FC Masar
24	MF	Maryam El-Demerdash	21 August 2006 (aged 19)	(United States Soccer Federation) Kansas City Roos
25	MF	Mena Ezat	13 July 2006 (aged 20)	(Egyptian Football Association) Wadi Degla
26	MF	Laila Edris	29 April 2007 (aged 19)	(United States Soccer Federation) UCLA Bruins

=== Malawi ===
Head coach: Lovemore Fazili

Malawi announced a preliminary 32-player squad on 26 June. They announced their final 23-player squad on 11 July.

No.	Pos.	Player	Date of birth (age)	Club
1	GK	Mercy Sikelo	22 December 1997 (aged 28)	(Football Association of Malawi) Civil Service United
2	DF	Olivia Phikani	20 July 2006 (aged 20)	(Football Association of Malawi) Kukoma Ntopwa Super Queens
3	FW	Deborah Henry	28 September 2004 (aged 21)	(Football Association of Malawi) Silver Strikers
4	DF	Chimwemwe Madise	6 April 1992 (aged 34)	(Congolese Association Football Federation) TP Mazembe
5	DF	Tionge Phiri	28 August 2000 (aged 25)	(Football Association of Malawi) Silver Strikers
6	MF	Rose Kadzere	16 June 2006 (aged 20)	(French Football Federation) Montpellier
7	FW	Asimenye Simwaka	8 August 1997 (aged 28)	(Football Association of Malawi) MDF Lioness
8	MF	Tendai Sani	11 January 2004 (aged 22)	(Football Association of Zambia) ZISD
9	FW	Sabinah Thom	3 March 1996 (aged 30)	(Royal Moroccan Football Federation) Phoenix Marrakesh
10	FW	Temwa Chaŵinga	20 September 1998 (aged 27)	(United States Soccer Federation) Kansas City Current
11	FW	Tabitha Chaŵinga	22 May 1996 (aged 30)	(French Football Federation) Lyon
12	MF	Madyina Ngulube	18 June 1996 (aged 30)	(Football Association of Malawi) Silver Strikers
13	FW	Vanessa Chikupila	2 April 1996 (aged 30)	(Egyptian Football Association) Palm Hills
14	DF	Maggie Chavula	28 April 2005 (aged 21)	(Football Association of Malawi) Ascent Academy
15	MF	Leticia Chinyamula	12 June 2006 (aged 20)	(Football Association of Malawi) Ascent Academy
16	GK	Yamikani Kawonga	11 October 2004 (aged 21)	(Football Association of Malawi) MDF Lioness
17	MF	Faith Chimzimu	21 February 2007 (aged 19)	(Swedish Football Association) BK Häcken
18	DF	Ireen Khumalo	12 December 2003 (aged 22)	(Football Association of Malawi) Silver Strikers
19	DF	Chisomo Banda	3 November 2003 (aged 22)	(Football Association of Zambia) Konkola Blades
20	MF	Sarah Mulimbika	11 January 2007 (aged 19)	(Football Association of Zambia) Green Buffaloes
21	DF	Rose Alufandika	4 November 2005 (aged 20)	(Football Association of Malawi) Kukoma Ntopwa Super Queens
22	DF	Benadetta Mkandawire	28 September 2003 (aged 22)	(Football Association of Malawi) Nyasa Big Bullets
23	GK	Esther Maulidi	3 February 2008 (aged 18)	(Football Association of Malawi) Mighty Wanderers
24	MF	Chikondi Gondwe	16 September 1998 (aged 27)	(Football Association of Malawi) Silver Strikers
25	MF	Lyna James	23 November 1998 (aged 27)	(Football Association of Malawi) Nyasa Big Bullets
26	FW	Vitumbiko Mkandawire	17 December 2000 (aged 25)	(Football Association of Malawi) Civil Service United

== Group D ==
=== Ghana ===
Head coach: (Sweden) Kim Björkegren

Ghana announced a preliminary 27-player squad on 6 July.

No.	Pos.	Player	Date of birth (age)	Club
1	GK	Cynthia Konlan	29 November 2002 (aged 23)	(Ghana Football Association) Samartex
2	DF	Bénédicte Simon	2 June 1997 (aged 29)	(Swiss Football Association) Servette
3	DF	Susan Ama Duah	3 February 2002 (aged 24)	(Portuguese Football Federation) Racing Power
4	DF	Abena Anoma Opoku	10 January 2004 (aged 22)	(All India Football Federation) East Bengal
5	MF	Grace Asantewaa	5 December 2000 (aged 25)	(Mexican Football Federation) FC Juárez
6	MF	Jennifer Cudjoe	7 March 1994 (aged 32)	(United States Soccer Federation) Brooklyn FC
7	FW	Princess Marfo	2 October 2003 (aged 22)	(Royal Dutch Football Association) PSV Eindhoven
8	MF	Chantelle Boye-Hlorkah	8 September 1995 (aged 30)	(The Football Association) Nottingham Forest
9	FW	Doris Boaduwaa	24 December 2002 (aged 23)	(Israel Football Association) Hapoel Katamon Jerusalem
10	FW	Princella Adubea	27 December 1998 (aged 27)	(Turkish Football Federation) Yüksekova
11	FW	Alice Kusi	12 January 1995 (aged 31)	(Saudi Arabian Football Federation) Al-Hilal
12	DF	Anasthesia Achiaa	20 December 2003 (aged 22)	(Hungarian Football Federation) ETO Győr
13	MF	Evelyn Badu	11 September 2002 (aged 23)	(Canadian Soccer Association) Montreal Roses
14	FW	Stella Nyamekye	18 September 2005 (aged 20)	(Norwegian Football Federation) Brann
15	DF	Comfort Yeboah	17 December 2006 (aged 19)	(Royal Spanish Football Federation) Logroño United
16	GK	Afi Amenyeku	15 November 2005 (aged 20)	(Albanian Football Federation) Apolonia
17	DF	Portia Boakye	17 April 1989 (aged 37)	(Congolese Association Football Federation) TP Mazembe
18	DF	Louisa Aniwaa	4 April 2003 (aged 23)	(Portuguese Football Federation) Valadares Gaia
19	DF	Alexandra Tay	1 January 2007 (aged 19)	(United States Soccer Federation) Stanford Cardinal
20	FW	Ajegipina Zakaria	24 August 2005 (aged 20)	(Ghana Football Association) Ampem Darkoa
21	MF	Linda Owusu Ansah	3 July 2006 (aged 20)	(Canadian Soccer Association) AFC Toronto
22	GK	Huzeima Osman	1 October 2005 (aged 20)	(Ghana Football Association) Jonina
23	DF	Josephine Bonsu	20 August 1999 (aged 26)	(German Football Association) Carl Zeiss Jena
24	MF	Wasiima Mohammed	22 March 2004 (aged 22)	(Swiss Football Association) FC Zürich
25	FW	Abi Kim	19 July 1998 (aged 28)	(Turkish Football Federation) Trabzonspor
26	FW	Sharon Sampson	14 October 2002 (aged 23)	(Swedish Football Association) Piteå IF

=== Cameroon ===
Head coach: Valentine Nguele

Cameroon announced their final 26-player squad on 26 June.

No.	Pos.	Player	Date of birth (age)	Club
1	GK	Cathy Biya	18 July 2006 (aged 20)	(Royal Spanish Football Federation) Getafe
2	DF	Easther Mayi Kith	28 March 1997 (aged 29)	(Japan Football Association) Urawa Red Diamonds
3	DF	Berthe Abega	14 June 2001 (aged 25)	(Royal Moroccan Football Federation) Phoenix Marrakesh
4	DF	Ladifatou Ngambe	18 October 2003 (aged 22)	(Congolese Association Football Federation) TP Mazembe
5	DF	Lewyo Mogai	16 November 2004 (aged 21)	(Cameroonian Football Federation) FC Ebolowa
6	MF	Achta Toko Njoya	8 July 2005 (aged 21)	(Royal Spanish Football Federation) Real Madrid
7	FW	Gabrielle Onguéné (captain)	25 February 1989 (aged 37)	(Russian Football Union) CSKA Moscow
8	MF	Fatima Komé	22 July 2002 (aged 24)	(Turkish Football Federation) Beşiktaş
9	FW	Grâce Mendoua	18 February 2005 (aged 21)	(Cameroonian Football Federation) FC Ebolowa
10	FW	Naomi Eto	29 September 2004 (aged 21)	(Italian Football Federation) Sassuolo
11	FW	Marie Ngah	20 October 2002 (aged 23)	(Turkish Football Federation) Galatasaray
12	MF	Ornella Beulou	30 May 2001 (aged 25)	(Cameroonian Football Federation) FC Ebolowa
13	MF	Charlène Meyong	19 November 1998 (aged 27)	(Saudi Arabian Football Federation) Al-Ahli
14	MF	Monique Ngock	17 September 2004 (aged 21)	(French Football Federation) Fleury
15	DF	Colette Ndzana	19 July 2000 (aged 26)	(French Football Federation) Dijon
16	GK	Ange Bawou	12 February 2000 (aged 26)	(Cameroonian Football Federation) Dja Sports
17	FW	Rose Bella	5 May 1994 (aged 32)	(Saudi Arabian Football Federation) Al-Ula
18	DF	Claudia Dabda	1 July 2001 (aged 25)	(Saudi Arabian Football Federation) Al-Hilal
19	MF	Raïssa Mbappé	4 October 1993 (aged 32)	(Royal Spanish Football Federation) Real Oviedo
20	MF	Genevieve Ngo Mbeleck	10 March 1993 (aged 33)	(Turkish Football Federation) Amed
21	DF	Maëva Nyadjou	14 October 2006 (aged 19)	(Cameroonian Football Federation) Amazone FAP
22	FW	Michaela Abam	12 June 1997 (aged 29)	(Mexican Football Federation) Cruz Azul
23	GK	Michaely Bihina	28 December 2003 (aged 22)	(Portuguese Football Federation) Benfica
24	FW	Nina Ngueleu	11 December 2004 (aged 21)	(French Football Federation) Montpellier
25	DF	Ousmanou Doudou	26 January 1996 (aged 30)	(Cameroonian Football Federation) FC Ebolowa
26	DF	Ivana Yakana	17 November 2005 (aged 20)	(Cameroonian Football Federation) Lekié FF

=== Mali ===
Head coach: Birama Konaté

Mali announced their final 26-player squad on 15 July.

No.	Pos.	Player	Date of birth (age)	Club
1	GK	Fatoumata Karentao (captain)	8 November 1990 (aged 35)	(Malian Football Federation) USFAS
2	DF	Coulouba Sogoré	3 June 1997 (aged 29)	(French Football Federation) Auxerre
3	DF	Mariam Marega	16 September 2001 (aged 24)	(French Football Federation) Roubaix Wervicq
4	DF	Fatou Dembele	30 November 2000 (aged 25)	(Royal Spanish Football Federation) Tenerife
5	MF	Marine Coudon	1 March 1992 (aged 34)	(French Football Federation) Albi
6	MF	Coumba Dembele	25 October 2001 (aged 24)	(French Football Federation) Roubaix Wervicq
7	MF	Fatoumata Diarra	15 April 1986 (aged 40)	(Tanzania Football Federation) Tausi
8	MF	Yakaré Niakaté	12 January 1997 (aged 29)	(French Football Federation) Nice
9	FW	Oumou Kone	20 December 1999 (aged 26)	(Malian Football Federation) USFAS
10	FW	Agueicha Diarra	30 July 1998 (aged 27)	(French Football Federation) Paris Saint-Germain
11	MF	Salimata Diarra	24 October 1994 (aged 31)	(Royal Moroccan Football Federation) FUS Rabat
12	MF	Hawa N'Diaye	15 September 2003 (aged 22)	(Royal Moroccan Football Federation) USSB Berkane
13	DF	Kani Konté	13 April 1989 (aged 37)	(French Football Federation) Paris SO Cœur
14	FW	Aïssata Traoré	9 September 1997 (aged 28)	(United States Soccer Federation) Boston Legacy
15	FW	Kadidiatou Diabaté	5 February 2007 (aged 19)	(Malian Football Federation) AS Mandé
16	GK	Goundo Samaké	2 May 1992 (aged 34)	(Malian Football Federation) FE La Source
17	FW	Jasmin Diop	29 October 2005 (aged 20)	(Canadian Soccer Association) CS Longueuil
18	MF	Kadiatou Diarra	13 November 2008 (aged 17)	(French Football Federation) Paris FC
19	FW	Fatoumata Niakaté	22 December 2006 (aged 19)	(French Football Federation) Saint-Denis
20	MF	Saratou Traoré	27 September 2002 (aged 23)	(Chinese Football Association) Beijing
21	DF	Oumou Sidibé	4 January 2008 (aged 18)	(French Football Federation) Paris FC
22	GK	Aïssatou Liberge	4 December 2005 (aged 20)	(French Football Federation) La Roche-sur-Yon
23	DF	Teninsoun Sissoko	2 September 1992 (aged 33)	(French Football Federation) Paris FC
24	DF	Aliya Diagne	8 May 2001 (aged 25)	(United States Soccer Federation) UCF Knights
25	DF	Orokia Sissoko	25 October 2000 (aged 25)	(French Football Federation) Roubaix Wervicq
26	FW	Aminata Dicko	27 March 2004 (aged 22)	(French Football Federation) Rueil-Malmaison

=== Cape Verde ===
Head coach: Silvéria Nédio

Cape Verde announced a preliminary 27-player squad on 13 July.

No.	Pos.	Player	Date of birth (age)	Club
1	GK	Jacinta Rodrigues	3 August 1992 (aged 33)	(Cape Verdean Football Federation) Fénix Talentos
2	DF	Varsénia da Luz (Captain)	19 March 1992 (aged 34)	(Cape Verdean Football Federation) Fénix Talentos
3	DF	Alivia Kelly	1 December 2001 (aged 24)	(Football Association of the Czech Republic) Slovácko
4	MF	Larissa Melo	12 July 2002 (aged 24)	(Portuguese Football Federation) Albergaria
5	DF	Eleia Vieira	3 August 2000 (aged 25)	(Portuguese Football Federation) Real Sport Clube
6	MF	Maísa Cardoso	2 February 1999 (aged 27)	(Portuguese Football Federation) Guia
7	FW	Ivânia Moreira	13 May 1993 (aged 33)	(Portuguese Football Federation) Albergaria
8	DF	Romina Rosário	14 December 1992 (aged 33)	(Portuguese Football Federation) JuveForce
9	MF	Kleydiana Borges	5 October 1995 (aged 30)	(Malta Football Association) Birkirkara
10	MF	Natasha Whanon	3 August 1997 (aged 28)	(Portuguese Football Federation) JuveForce
11	DF	Leonilde Rodrigues	21 August 1998 (aged 27)	(Portuguese Football Federation) Albergaria
12	GK	Lara Silva	25 February 2007 (aged 19)	(Portuguese Football Federation) Sporting CP
13	MF	Sylviane Gomes	7 December 2001 (aged 24)	(French Football Federation) Nice
14	FW	Yeiza Rodrigues	15 February 2003 (aged 23)	(Polish Football Association) Medyk Konin
15	DF	Jennifer Santos	10 December 1998 (aged 27)	(Portuguese Football Federation) Estrela Amadora
16	DF	Leidina Semedo	8 September 2005 (aged 20)	(Portuguese Football Federation) Racing Power
17	FW	Evy Pereira	27 March 1994 (aged 32)	(Portuguese Football Federation) Valadares Gaia
18	MF	Alcione Santos	26 June 2001 (aged 25)	(Cape Verdean Football Federation) Fénix Talentos
19	FW	Luriane Tavares	2 July 2007 (aged 19)	(Portuguese Football Federation) Racing Power
20	FW	Irlanda Lopes	6 October 1996 (aged 29)	(Portuguese Football Federation) Vitória Guimarães
21	FW	Sandra Soares-Martins	25 August 1999 (aged 26)	(The Football Association) London Bees
22	FW	Adriana Semedo	30 October 1999 (aged 26)	(Portuguese Football Federation) Porto
23	GK	Luana Tavares Gomes	3 October 2005 (aged 20)	(Cape Verdean Football Federation) Vila Nova
24	MF	Dara Monteiro	25 April 2003 (aged 23)	(Portuguese Football Federation) Real Sport Clube
25	MF	Luana Moniz	9 July 2004 (aged 22)	(Portuguese Football Federation) Estrela Amadora
26	DF	Daniela Lopes	4 December 2004 (aged 21)	(Portuguese Football Federation) Estrela Amadora

== Statistics ==
Note: Only the final squad list of each national team is taken into consideration.

=== Player representation by league system ===
League systems with 14 or more players represented are listed.

Country	Players	Outside national squad
France	53	53
Tanzania	24	5
Morocco	22	9
South Africa	21	0
Portugal	20	20
Egypt	19	2
Saudi Arabia	17	17
United States	17	17
Turkey	16	16
Spain	16	16
Zambia	16	3
Malawi	16	0
Kenya	15	0
Burkina Faso	14	0

=== Average age of squads ===
Nation	Avg. Age	Oldest player	Youngest player
Morocco	27.7	Aziza Rabbah (40 years, 22 days)	Kautar Azraf (18 years, 204 days)
South Africa	27.4	Bambanani Mbane (36 years, 136 days)	Zoë October (18 years, 40 days)
Mali	26.8	Fatoumata Diarra (40 years, 102 days)	Kadiatou Diarra (17 years, 255 days)
Nigeria	26.4	Osinachi Ohale (34 years, 217 days)	Fatima Oloko (18 years, 174 days)
Algeria	25.9	Sofia Guellati (34 years, 17 days)	Amira Benaïssa (19 years, 0 days)
Cape Verde	25.9	Varsénia da Luz (34 years, 129 days)	Luriane Tavares (19 years, 24 days)
Zambia	25.9	Rachael Nachula (40 years, 193 days)	Mercy Chipasula (18 years, 125 days)
Ivory Coast	25.3	Ange N'Guessan (35 years, 250 days)	N'Sira Ouédraogo (18 years, 96 days)
Senegal	25.3	Tenning Sène (36 years, 186 days)	Mbène Diop (16 years, 114 days)
Cameroon	25.1	Gabrielle Aboudi Onguéné (37 years, 151 days)	Maéva Nyadjou (19 years, 285 days)
Kenya	24.6	Enez Mango (33 years, 25 days)	Elizabeth Ochaka (17 years, 47 days)
Burkina Faso	24.5	Stéphanie Sow (30 years, 266 days)	Deborah Guira (17 years, 323 days)
Ghana	24.2	Portia Boakye (37 years, 100 days)	Alexandra Tay (19 years, 206 days)
Malawi	24.2	Chimwemwe Madise (34 years, 111 days)	Esther Maulidi (18 years, 173 days)
Egypt	22.6	Maha Shehata (37 years, 163 days)	Camilla Abouseif (17 years, 333 days)
Tanzania	22.2	Asha Rashid (35 years, 195 days)	Elizabeth Chenge (15 years, 1 day)
