= Dimitri Lipoff =

French football manager (born 1984)

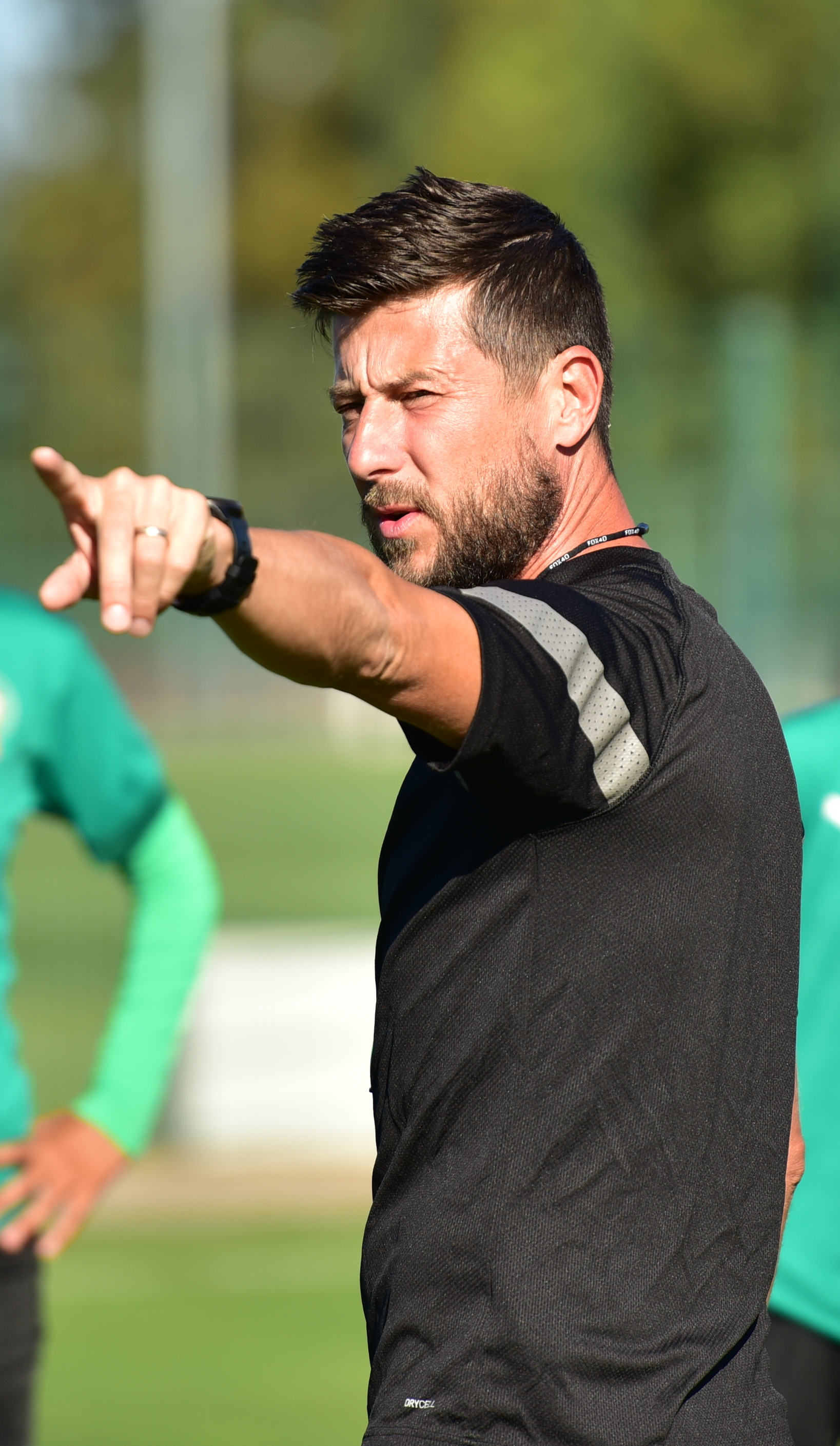
- Lipoff managing Morocco Women U20 in 2024

Personal information
- Full name: Dimitri Lipoff
- Date of birth: 20 January 1984 (age 42)
- Place of birth: Lyon, France

Team information
- Current team: Al Ahly Women (manager)

Managerial career
- Years: Team
- 2009–2011: Olympique Lyonnais(a)
- 2011–2012: WFC Rossiyanka(a)
- 2011–2012: Russia Women(a)
- 2012–2016: PSG Women(a)
- 2016–2018: Dalian W.F.C.(a)
- 2018–2019: Jiangsu W.F.C.(a)
- 2019–2021: Wuhan Jianghan W.F.C.
- 2021–2023: SSD Napoli Femminile
- 2023–2024: Morocco Women U23
- 2024: Morocco Women U20
- 2024–2026: Al Ahly Women

Dimitri Lipoff (born 20 January 1984) is a French professional football manager and former player who is the current head coach of Al Ahly Women in the Egyptian Women's Premier League.

== Career ==
=== Training and retraining ===
Former amateur player in France and Belgium, Dimitri Lipoff decided to obtain a certain number of diplomas to be able to coach. He holds the UEFA A license (BEF) which he obtained in June 2021.

=== Head coach ===
At the end of 2019, this time it was alone that Dimitri Lipoff joined Wuhan Jianghan University. The team won the national championship for the first time in its history in 2020, four years after reaching the Chinese top division. In 2021, Lipoff and her players repeated the performance by winning the Chinese Women's Super League for a second consecutive time.

In 2021, while keeping details confidential, Dimitri Lipoff is in contact with an African selection, which is part of his priority career objectives.

After a season with the Neapolitan club, Lipoff was appointed by the FRMF as coach of the Morocco women's under-23 team on August 14, 2023, for a two-year contract11. He plays his first match at the head of the Moroccan selection, on September 22, 2023, against Iceland in a friendly match at the Mohammed VI Complex. The match ended with a defeat for the Moroccans (3–2). The two teams met again three days later and the match ended in a draw (0-0).

Subsequently, still with Morocco, the FRMF appointed him as head coach of the women's under-20 selection, succeeding Stéphane Nado. His first meeting with the selection took place on February 23, 2024, as part of the Pinatar Cup against the Czech Republic. Tournament at the end of which, Morocco finished in 3rd place after its victory against Sweden (2–1).

However, while the selection is preparing for the World Cup, the FRMF decides to part ways with him and announces on May 24, 2024, the amicable termination of his contract.

In July 2024, he took charge of Egypt and was appointed coach of the Al Ahly FC Women's team.

== Honors and achievements ==
Wuhan Jianghan University

- Chinese Women's Super League:2020 and 2021

SSD Napoli

- Serie B: 2023

Morocco Women U20

- Pinatar Cup: 3rd Place in 2024

Al Ahly Women

- Egyptian Women's Cup: 2025
