= Egypt women's national football team =

Women's national association football team representing Egypt

Egypt
- Nickname: Female Pharaohs
- Association: Egyptian Football Association
- Confederation: CAF (Africa)
- Sub-confederation: UNAF (North Africa)
- Head coach: Mohamed Moustafa Abd El-Hamid
- Top scorer: Amany Rashad (21)
- Home stadium: Cairo International
- FIFA code: EGY
First colours	Second colours

FIFA ranking
- Current: 113 ▼14 (20 October 2026)
- Highest: 58 (December 2005)
- Lowest: 101 (December 2025)

First international
- Egypt 1–1 Uganda (Egypt; 29 March 1998)

Biggest win
- Egypt 15–0 Iraq (Manama, Bahrain; 21 October 2010)

Biggest defeat
- Nigeria 6–0 Egypt (Kaduna, Nigeria; 23 October 1998); Zambia 6–0 Egypt (Rabat, Morocco; 28 July 2026)

Women's Africa Cup of Nations
- Appearances: 3 (first in 1998)
- Best result: Group stage (1998, 2016, 2026)

The Egypt women's national football team (Arabic: منتخب مصر لكرة القدم للسيدات), nicknamed "Female Pharaohs", represents Egypt in international women's football. It is managed by the Egyptian Football Association, the governing body of football in the country.

Like most African nations, women's football in Egypt has lacked development and big fame, whereas the men's team is one of the continent's most established football powers, and is the most African decorated team.

== History ==
The team had an agonizing start, losing 17–0 to Russia in a 1993 unofficial friendly. An unimpressed correspondent in the Egyptian Mail newspaper wrote of the players:

Their bucksome blubbery bodies played havoc, with their running becoming turtle-paced. And the crowd shouted at them to go back home.

After some development, the Cleopatras made their official debut in the 1998 African Championship after beating Uganda in the qualifying round. They lost all three group-stage matches, scoring a total of two goals.

In 2012 they made their fourth appearance in the African Championship's qualifiers. They were knocked out by Ethiopia.

Egypt qualified for the 2016 Women's Africa Cup of Nations after beating Ivory Coast which was considered an upset as Ivory Coast had competed in the 2015 Women's World Cup. At the tournament, Egypt lost 2–0 to Cameroon and 5–0 to South Africa but were able to snatch their first victory against Zimbabwe thanks to a goal by Salma Tarik.

Egypt did not enter the qualification rounds to the 2019 World Cup nor the 2018 Women's Africa Cup of Nations. The team failed to qualify for the 2022 Women's Africa Cup of Nations.

As of 21 August 2023, the team was ranked 88th in the world by FIFA.

== Team image ==
=== Nicknames ===
The Egypt women's national football team has officially been known or nicknamed as the "Female Pharaohs" (Sayyedat El Faraana).

=== Home stadium ===
Egypt plays their home matches on the Cairo International Stadium.

=== Overall competitive record ===
Competition	Stage	Opponent	Result	Position	Scorers
1998 African Championship qualifying	Single round	Uganda	1–1 1–0		
(Nigeria) 1998 African Championship	First round	DR Congo; Morocco; Nigeria	1–4; 1–4; 0–6	4 / 4	
2000 African Championship qualifying	Single round	Réunion	3–4 1–1		
2006 African Championship qualifying	First round	Eritrea	Walkover		
2006 African Championship qualifying	Second round	Algeria	0–1 0–3		
2008 African Championship qualifying	First round	Tunisia	Withdrew		
(Tunisia) 2009 North African Tournament	Single round	Tunisia; Algeria	2–6; 1–1	3 / 3	
2010 African Championship qualifying	First round	Algeria	Withdrew		
2012 African Championship qualifying	First round	Ethiopia	4–2 0–4		Atia (2), Tarek, Abd El-Hafiz
2014 African Championship qualifying	First round	Tunisia	0–3, 2–2		Tarek
(Cameroon) 2016 Africa Women Cup of Nations	First round	Cameroon	2–0	3 / 4	Onguéné, Manie
(Cameroon) 2016 Africa Women Cup of Nations	First round	Zimbabwe	0–1	3 / 4	Tarik
(Cameroon) 2016 Africa Women Cup of Nations	First round	South Africa	5–0	3 / 4	Mgcoyi, Vilakazi, Jane, Seoposenwe, Motlhalo

== Results and fixtures ==
The following is a list of match results in the last 12 months, as well as any future matches that have been scheduled.

Legend

Win Draw Lose Fixture

=== 2025 ===
23 October 2025 2026 WAFCON qualifying	Egypt	0–3	Ghana	Ismailia
18:00 UTC+2		Report (FIFA)	Boaduwaa 42'; Amponsah 85'; Asantewaa 90+2'	Stadium: Suez Canal Stadium; Referee: Akhona Makalima (South Africa)

28 October 2025 2026 WAFCON qualifying	Ghana	4–0	Egypt	Accra
15:30 UTC+0	Boaduwaa 52', 55', 90+2'; Yeboah 57'	Report (FIFA)		Stadium: Accra Sports Stadium; Referee: Antsino Twanyanyukwa (Namibia)
Note: Ghana won 7–0 on aggregate.

=== 2026 ===
28 February 2026 Friendly	Egypt	0–3	Algeria	Cairo, Egypt
20:45 UTC+2			Boussaha 49'; Khiri 55'; Naili 87'	Stadium: EFA Center

2 March 2026 Friendly	Egypt	2–3	Algeria	Cairo, Egypt
19:30 UTC+2	El Behery 37'; Nadda 49'		D'Oria 33'; Boutaleb 61'; Khiri 74'	Stadium: EFA Center

14 April 2026 Friendly	Saudi Arabia	1–2	Egypt	Abha, Saudi Arabia
19:00 UTC+3	Abdullah 38'	Report	Ghazi 59'; El Sayed 73'; El Mitwalli (yellow card) (yellow-red card) 90+7'	Stadium: Prince Sultan bin Abdulaziz Sports City Stadium; Referee: Husain Al-Showaikh (Bahrain); Assistant referees: Ahmed Al-Ghareeb (Bahrain); Husain Jaafar (Bahrain); Fourth official: Kalthoum Hantoul (Saudi Arabia)

18 April 2026 Friendly	Saudi Arabia	0–2	Egypt	Abha, Saudi Arabia
19:00 UTC+3			Ghazi 45+2' (pen.); El Sayed 90+4'	Referee: Mohammed Al-Manii (Oman)

5 June 2026 Friendly	Egypt	1–1 (4–2 p)	Tunisia	Cairo, Egypt
19:00 UTC+2	Khalifa 17'	Report	Houij 90'	Stadium: EFA Center; Referee: Shahenda El Maghrabi (Egypt)
	Penalties
	Ghazi (penalty scored); Khaled (penalty scored); Salama (penalty scored); Nadda (penalty scored)		(penalty missed) Houij; (penalty missed) Zemzem; (penalty scored) Guermazi; (penalty scored) Ouni

8 June 2026 Friendly	Tunisia	2–2 (6–7 p)	Egypt	Cairo, Egypt
19:00 UTC+2	Zemzem 5'; Guermazi 64'		Undefined 60'; Undefined 87'

8 July 2026 Friendly	Egypt	0–1	Senegal	Cairo, Egypt
19:00 UTC+2		Report	N. Ndiaye 48' (pen.)	Stadium: EFA National Teams Center

11 July 2026 Friendly	Egypt	1–0	Senegal	Cairo, Egypt
19:00 UTC+2		Report		Stadium: EFA National Teams Center

28 July 2026 2026 WAFCON GS	Zambia	6–0	Egypt	Rabat, Morocco
18:00 UTC+1	Nachula 25'; Banda 60' (pen.), 63', 87', 90+6'; Phiri 90+2'	Report (FIFA)		Stadium: Rabat Olympic Stadium; Referee: Shamirah Nabadda (Uganda)

1 August 2026 WAFCON GS	Egypt	1–3	Malawi	Rabat, Morocco
17:00 UTC+1:00	Hassan 71'	Report	Kadzere 34'; Chinzimu 45+2'; Chawinga 68'	Stadium: Moulay El Hassan Stadium

5 August 2026 WAFCON GS	Egypt	2–6	Nigeria	Rabat, Morocco
21:00 (UTC+01:00)	Ghazi 45+9' (pen.), 84'		Oshoala 21' (pen.); Monday 45+1'; Kanu 57'; Ucheibe 81' (pen.); Ajibade 90+1' (pen.); Omewa 90+9'	Stadium: Rabat Olympic Stadium; Referee: Aline Umutoni (Rwanda)

== Coaching staff ==
=== Current coaching staff ===
As of 7 August 2026:

Position	Name	Ref.
Head coach	(Egypt) Mohamed Kamal	

=== Manager history ===
- (Egypt) Mohamed Mostafa Abdelhamid(20xx–2024)
- (Egypt) Ahmed Ramadhan(2025–present)

== Players ==
=== Current squad ===
- The following players were called up for the 2026 WAFCON matches from 26 July through 16 August 2026. .

Note: All player data is sourced from the official CAF squad list. Club listings correspond to the official registration data provided by CAF and may not reflect recent player transfers prior to the tournament.

No.	Pos.	Player	Date of birth (age)	Club
1	GK	Maha Shehata (Captain)	13 February 1989 (aged 37)	(Egyptian Football Association) Al Ahly
2	DF	Camélia El-Hofy	16 March 2007 (aged 19)	(Royal Moroccan Football Federation) Wydad
3	DF	Nour Abdelwahed	4 April 2004 (aged 22)	(Egyptian Football Association) FC Masar
4	DF	Noura Khaled	12 December 2004 (aged 21)	(Egyptian Football Association) Al Ahly
5	DF	Thouria Ashraf	11 November 1997 (aged 28)	(Egyptian Football Association) Al Ahly
6	DF	Nada Emad	8 January 2001 (aged 25)	(Egyptian Football Association) FC Masar
7	MF	Nadin Ghazy	24 November 2001 (aged 24)	(Egyptian Football Association) Al Ahly
8	DF	Amira Mohammed	23 April 2003 (aged 23)	(Egyptian Football Association) FC Masar
9	FW	Farah El-Mahdy	30 May 2007 (aged 19)	(Egyptian Football Association) FC Masar
10	FW	Sarah Essam	6 April 1999 (aged 27)	(The Football Association) Hull City
11	MF	Menna Tarek	1 March 1999 (aged 27)	(Egyptian Football Association) Al Ahly
12	DF	Eman Hassan	6 November 2000 (aged 25)	(Egyptian Football Association) Al Ahly
13	FW	Leia Khairy	13 June 2004 (aged 22)	(Canadian Soccer Association) Mont-Royal Outremont
14	MF	Camilla Abouseif	27 August 2008 (aged 17)	(Egyptian Football Association) Palm Hills
15	DF	Christina Salama	6 June 2006 (aged 20)	(United States Soccer Federation) West Virginia Mountaineers
16	GK	Farah Samir	2 July 2001 (aged 25)	(Egyptian Football Association) Wadi Degla
17	DF	Habiba Biktash	1 March 2007 (aged 19)	(Egyptian Football Association) FC Masar
18	MF	Habiba Essam	20 March 2007 (aged 19)	(Egyptian Football Association) Al Ahly
19	MF	Yassmin Abdelaziz	2 February 2002 (aged 24)	(Egyptian Football Association) FC Masar
20	DF	Sienna Church	11 November 2007 (aged 18)	(United States Soccer Federation) UT Rio Grande Valley
21	MF	Dana Nadda	14 November 2004 (aged 21)	(United States Soccer Federation) Southern Illinois Salukis
22	MF	Mahira Ali	1 November 1997 (aged 28)	(Chinese Football Association) Beijing Jingtan
23	GK	Habiba Sabry	8 January 2006 (aged 20)	(Egyptian Football Association) FC Masar
24	MF	Maryam El-Demerdash	21 August 2006 (aged 19)	(United States Soccer Federation) Kansas City Roos
25	MF	Mena Ezat	13 July 2006 (aged 20)	(Egyptian Football Association) Wadi Degla
26	MF	Laila Edris	29 April 2007 (aged 19)	(United States Soccer Federation) UCLA Bruins

=== Recent call-ups ===
The following players have been called up for the team in the last 12 months.

Pos.	Player	Date of birth (age)	Caps	Goals	Club	Latest call-up
GK	Elham Eid	26 September 1994 (age 32)	-	-	(Egypt) ZED FC	v. Algeria, 2 March 2026
GK	Kenzy Magdy				(Egypt) Zamalek SC	v. Ghana, 28 October 2025
GK	Taghred El-Shahat		-	-	(Egypt) Al Mokawloon Al Arab	v. Tunisia, 8 June 2026
DF	Yara Yasser		-	-	(Egypt)	v. Algeria, 2 March 2026
DF	Aya Khaled		-	-	(Egypt)	v. Algeria, 2 March 2026
DF	Samia Adam	19 April 1996 (age 30)	-	-	Unattached	v. Algeria, 2 March 2026
DF	Samr Adel	9 August 1993 (age 33)	-	-	(Egypt) NBE	v. Algeria, 2 March 2026
DF	Rodeina Abdelrasol	8 March 2006 (age 20)	-	-	(Egypt) {{{club}}}	v. Algeria, 2 March 2026
DF	Bassant Abdelaziz				(Egypt) Wadi Degla	v. Ghana, 28 October 2025
DF	Nour Nehad				(Egypt) []]	v. Ghana, 28 October 2025
MF	Joy Emad		-	-	(Egypt) Wadi Degla	v. Algeria, 2 March 2026
MF	Yara Sabry	21 March 1999 (age 27)	-	-	(Egypt) Masar	v. Algeria, 2 March 2026
MF	Sally Mansour	15 May 1990 (age 36)	-	-	(Egypt) NBE	v. Algeria, 2 March 2026
MF	Morgane Mohey Eldin	8 August 2003 (age 23)	-	-	(France) ES Troyes AC	v. Algeria, 2 March 2026
MF	Marwa Tawfik	3 July 1998 (age 28)			(Egypt) Wadi Degla	v. Ghana, 28 October 2025
MF	Sherouk El Sayed				(Egypt) Wadi Degla	v. Ghana, 28 October 2025
MF	Hala Moustafa	19 October 2005 (age 21)	-	-	(Egypt) FC Masar	v. Tunisia, 8 June 2026
MF	Zahra Alaa		-	-	(Egypt) NBE	v. Tunisia, 8 June 2026
FW	Abeer Haggag		-	-	(Egypt) Palm Hills	v. Algeria, 2 March 2026
FW	Nedya Sawan	22 April 2002 (age 24)	-	-	(Canada) Vancouver Rise	v. Algeria, 2 March 2026
FW	Nadia Ramadan	21 January 2005 (age 21)			(United States) Alabama Crimson Tide	v. Ghana, 28 October 2025
FW	Laila El Behery	14 September 2003 (age 23)	-	-	(Denmark) Nordsjælland	v. Tunisia, 8 June 2026
FW	Sarah Khalifa	16 July 2005 (age 21)	-	-	(Germany) Mainz 05	v. Tunisia, 8 June 2026
FW	Natalia Ortiz		-	-	(United States) Chicago State Cougars	v. Tunisia, 8 June 2026
^{INJ} Player withdrew from the squad due to an injury.^{PRE} Preliminary squad.^{SUS} Player is serving a suspension.^{WD} Player withdrew for personal reasons.

=== Previous squads ===
Africa Women Cup of Nations

- 2016 Africa Women Cup of Nations squad
- 2026 Women's Africa Cup of Nations squads

== Competitive record ==
=== FIFA Women's World Cup ===
FIFA Women's World Cup record
Year	Result	GP	W	D*	L	GF	GA	GD
(China) 1991	Did Not Enter							
(Sweden) 1995	Did Not Enter							
(United States) 1999	Did not qualify							
(United States) 2003	Did Not Enter							
(China) 2007	Did not qualify							
(Germany) 2011	Did Not Enter							
(Canada) 2015	Did not qualify							
(France) 2019	Did not qualify							
(Australia) (New Zealand) 2023	Did not qualify							
(Brazil) 2027	Did not qualify							
(Costa Rica) (Jamaica) (Mexico) (United States) 2031	To be determined							
(United Kingdom) 2035	To be determined							
Total	0/10	-	-	-	-	-	-	-

*Draws include knockout matches decided on penalty kicks.

=== Olympic Games ===
Summer Olympics record
Year	Result	Pld	W	D*	L	GS	GA	GD
(United States) 1996 to (Japan) 2020	did not exist							
(France) 2024	did not qualify							
Total	0/8	0	0	0	0	0	0	0

*Draws include knockout matches decided on penalty kicks.

=== Africa Women Cup of Nations ===
Africa Women Cup of Nations record
Year	Round	GP	W	D	L	GS	GA	GD
1991	Did Not Enter							
1995	Did Not Enter							
(Nigeria) 1998	Group Stage	3	0	0	3	2	14	−12
(South Africa) 2000	Did not qualify							
(Nigeria) 2002	Did Not Enter							
(South Africa) 2004	Did Not Enter							
(Nigeria) 2006	Did not qualify							
(Equatorial Guinea) 2008	Did Not Enter							
(South Africa) 2010	Did Not Enter							
(Equatorial Guinea) 2012	Did not qualify							
(Namibia) 2014	Did not qualify							
(Cameroon) 2016	Group Stage	3	1	0	2	1	7	−6
(Ghana) 2018	Did Not Enter							
(Republic of the Congo) 2020	Cancelled							
(Morocco) 2022	Did not qualify							
(Morocco) 2024	Did not qualify							
(Morocco) 2026	Group Stage	3	0	0	3	3	15	−12
Total	Group Stage	9	1	0	8	6	36	−30

=== UNAF Women's Tournament ===
UNAF Women's Tournament record
Appearances: 2
Year	Round	Position	Pld	W	D	L	GF	GA	GD
(Tunisia) 2009	Third place	3rd	2	0	1	1	3	7	−4
(Tunisia) 2020	Withdrew								
Total	Winner	1/2	2	0	1	1	3	7	−4

=== Arab Women's Championship ===
Arab Women's Championship record
Appearances: 1
Year	Round	Position	Pld	W	D	L	GF	GA	GD
(Egypt) 2006	Fourth	4th	5	3	0	2	20	7	+13
(Egypt) 2021	Third	3rd	4	2	1	1	18	7	+11
Total	Third	2/2	10	4	3	3	33	12	+21

== Head-to-head record ==
Key

Positive balance (more wins than losses)
Neutral balance (as many wins as losses)
Negative balance (more losses than wins)

The following table shows Bahrain' all-time official international record per opponent:

Opponent	Pld	W	D	L	GF	GA	GD	W%	Confederation
Algeria	5	1	2	2	2	5	-3	20.00	CAF
Cameroon	1	0	0	1	0	2	-2	00.00	CAF
DR Congo	1	0	0	1	1	4	-3	00.00	CAF
Ethiopia	2	1	0	1	4	6	-2	50.00	CAF
Ghana	2	0	1	1	1	4	-3	00.00	CAF
India	1	0	0	1	0	1	-1	00.00	AFC
Iraq	1	1	0	0	15	0	+15	100.00	AFC
Ivory Coast	2	1	0	1	2	2	0	50.00	CAF
Jordan	10	4	2	4	8	10	-2	40.00	AFC
Kenya	2	1	0	1	1	1	0	50.00	CAF
Lebanon	2	2	0	0	9	1	+8	100.00	AFC
Libya	2	2	0	0	12	0	+12	100.00	CAF
Morocco	5	0	0	5	4	18	-14	00.00	CAF
Nigeria	1	0	0	1	0	6	-6	00.00	CAF
Palestine	2	2	0	0	13	0	+13	100.00	AFC
Réunion	2	0	1	1	4	5	-1	00.00	CAF
Senegal	2	1	1	0	2	1	+1	50.00	AFC
South Africa	2	0	0	2	1	8	-7	00.00	CAF
Sudan	1	1	0	0	10	0	+10	100.00	AFC
Syria	1	1	0	0	6	0	+6	100.00	AFC
Tunisia	10	2	2	6	12	25	-13	16.67	CAF
Uganda	4	3	1	0	7	2	+5	75.00	CAF
Zambia	2	0	0	2	0	2	-2	00.00	CAF
Zimbabwe	5	2	1	2	8	8	0	40.00	CAF
Total	68	25	11	32	122	111	+11	36.76	—

Last updated: Egypt vs Jordan, 10 October 2022.

== See also ==
- Sport in Egypt
  - Football in Egypt
    - Women's football in Egypt
- Muslim women in sport
- Women's association football
- Egypt national football team
- Egypt women's national under-20 football team
- Egypt women's national under-17 football team
