= Nadia Ramadan =

Egyptian-American soccer player (born 2005)

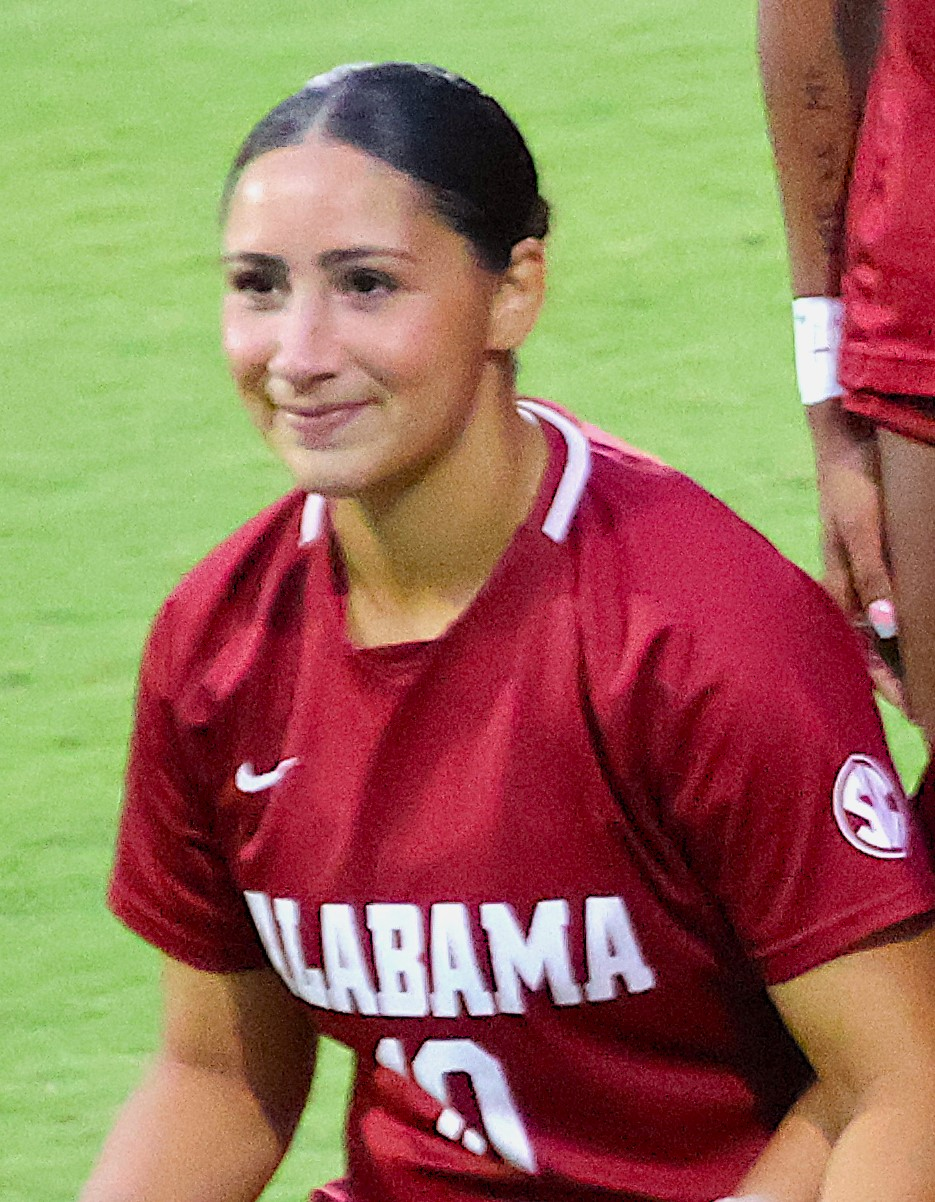
- Ramadan with Alabama in 2025

Personal information
- Full name: Nadia Ahmed Ramadan
- Date of birth: January 21, 2005 (age 21)
- Height: 5 ft 7 in (1.70 m)
- Position: Midfielder

Team information
- Current team: Kentucky Wildcats

Youth career
- 2017–2023: Sockers FC Chicago

College career
Years	Team	Apps	(Gls)
2023–2025	Alabama Crimson Tide	63	(17)
2026–	Kentucky Wildcats	0	(0)

Senior career*
Years	Team	Apps	(Gls)
2023	FC Masar		

International career
2019–2022	Egypt U-17		
2020–2024	Egypt U-20		
2025–	Egypt		
- * Club domestic league appearances and goals

Nadia Ahmed Ramadan (Arabic: نادية أحمد رمضان; born January 21, 2005) is a college soccer player who plays as a midfielder for the Kentucky Wildcats and the Egypt national team. She previously played for the Alabama Crimson Tide.

== Early life ==
Ramadan grew up in Algonquin, Illinois. When she was twelve, she joined Sockers FC Chicago, where her father coached, and helped her team reach the Girls Academy national final in 2022. She committed to play college soccer at the University of Alabama before her senior year at Huntley High School. In 2023, the summer before college, she played for Egyptian club FC Masar, while her father served as coach, and lifted the Egyptian Women's Cup with the club.

== College career ==
Ramadan became a starter for the Alabama Crimson Tide during her freshman season in 2023. She finished the season with 4 goals (joint-second on the team) in 22 games and was named to the Southeastern Conference (SEC) all-freshman team. In her sophomore season, she led the team in assists and was again their second-leading scorer with 7 goals in 21 games in 2024. She scored in both SEC tournament games the team played. The following summer, she trained with Egyptian club Wadi Degla, where her father newly coached. She was the third leading scorer for the Tide with 6 goals in 21 games as a junior in 2025, earning second-team All-SEC honors. She then transferred to the Kentucky Wildcats for her final season in 2026.

== International career ==
Ramadan began training with the Egyptian youth national team in 2019. In December 2020, at age 15, she scored a hat trick for the Egypt under-20s in a friendly win against Lebanon. Her father coached the under-20s at the time. In April 2022, she captained the Egypt under-17s in the third-round first-leg loss to Nigeria in 2022 African U-17 Women's World Cup qualification. In March 2023, she scored a penalty for the under-20s in the win against Tunisia at the 2023 UNAF U-20 Women's Tournament, where Egypt placed third. In January 2024, she scored a penalty in the fourth-round first-leg loss to Cameroon in 2024 African U-20 Women's World Cup qualification.

In April 2025, Ramadan was called up to Egypt's full national team by her father, the squad's head coach, for friendlies against Jordan.

== Personal life ==
Ramadan is the daughter of Ahmed Ramadan Gad, a professional soccer player-turned-coach, and Tagrid El Shalakany. She has three brothers who all played college soccer: Youssef at Saint Louis and DePaul, Omar at DePaul and Creighton, and Ali at Creighton.

== Honors and awards ==
FC Masar

- Egyptian Women's Cup: 2022–23

Individual

- Second-team All-SEC: 2025
- SEC all-freshman team: 2023
