= Nadine Mohamed =

Nadine Mohamed may refer to:

- Nadine Mohamed (basketball)
- Nadine Mohamed (footballer)
