= Habiba Essam =

Egyptian footballer (born 2007)

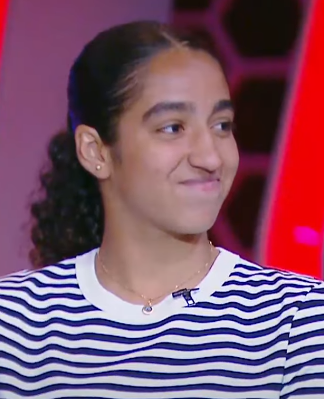
- Habiba Essam in 2025

Personal information
- Full name: Habiba Essam Mohamed Hafez
- Date of birth: 20 March 2007 (age 19)
- Positions: Midfielder; forward

Team information
- Current team: Al Ahly
- Number: 10

Youth career
- 2013–2021: Wadi Degla

Senior career*
Years	Team	Apps	(Gls)
2022–2024	Wadi Degla		
2024–	Al Ahly	14	(11)

International career^{‡}
2023–	Egypt U20	6	(3)
2023–	Egypt	3	(2)
- * Club domestic league appearances and goals as of 31 December 2024 ‡ National team caps and goals as of 25 February 2025

Habiba Essam Mohamed Hafez (Arabic: حبيبة عصام محمد حافظ; born 20 March 2007), commonly known as Habiba Essam 'Bibo' (Arabic: حبيبة عصام) is an Egyptian professional footballer playing as a midfielder for Egyptian Women's Premier League club Al Ahly and a forward for the Egyptian national football team.

== Club career ==
Habiba started playing football at the age of five and was soon spotted by then-Wadi Degla coach Mohamed Kamal, who brought her into the club. At just 16 years old, She competed in her first continental tournament, the 2022 CAF Women's Champions League, in Morocco with the Cairo-based club.

On 25 September 2024, the newly formed women's team of Al Ahly announced the signing of Habiba on a three-year contract worth over 1 million Egyptian pounds.

== International career ==
The Egyptian talent represented the country's U-20 team in the 2024 African U-20 Women's World Cup qualification, playing every match as Egypt reached the fourth round and scoring three goals.

Habiba was first called up to the Senior national team in November 2023, ahead of the 2024 Women's Africa Cup of Nations qualification matches against Senegal and was the youngest in the squad at 16 years old. On 5 December 2023, She made her debut for the team as starter in a scoreless draw against the Lioness of Teranga. On 21 February 2025, she scored her first international goal, securing the match-winning strike in an away game against Rwanda.

=== Career statistics ===
As of match played 25 February 2025

Appearances and goals by national team and year
National team	Year	Apps	Goals
Egypt	2023	1	0
Egypt	2025	2	2
Total		3	2

As of match played 25 February 2025

Scores and results list Egypt's goal tally first, score column indicates score after each Habiba Essam goal.

List of international goals scored by Habiba Essam
No.	Date	Cap	Venue	Opponent	Score	Result	Competition
1	21 February 2025	2	Kigali Pelé Stadium, Kigali, Rwanda	Rwanda	1–0	1–0	2026 WAFCON qualification
2	25 February 2025	3	Suez Canal Stadium, Ismailia, Egypt	Rwanda	2–1	2–2	2026 WAFCON qualification
