= Sahar (name) =

Iraqi Fashion designer Sahar Al-Khafaji

Sahar (Arabic: سحر, Hebrew: סהר) is either a feminine given name of common throughout the Persian-speaking and Arabic-Speaking, or unisex given name of Hebrew origin, used mainly in Israel. In Persian means exactly the time of “Sunrise”, and though the Arabic and Hebrew names are phonologically identical and both derive from Semitic languages, they are nonetheless etymologically unrelated. In Arabic, the name means "just before dawn", coming from a common Semitic root meaning "dawn" (compare with Shahar, the Ugaritic god of the dawn). Shachar(Hebrew: שחר) is a Hebrew name meaning "dawn" or "sunrise". The origin of the Hebrew name Sahar is an ancient Akkadian word for the crescent moon.

This name is mainly used by Persian, Arabic, Azeri, Turkish, Urdu, and Pashto speakers. "Seher" is the way it would be commonly spelled in Turkey and Azerbaijan.

Notable people with the name include

== Given name ==
- Sahar Baassiri (born 1986), Lebanese journalist
- Sahar Biniaz (born 1986), Canadian model
- Sahar Delijani (born 1983), Iranian author
- Sahar Dolatshahi (born 1979), Iranian actress
- Sahar El Hawari (born 1958), Egyptian football referee
- Sahar Gul (born c. 1998), Afghan child bride
- Sahar Hashemi (born 1967), British entrepreneur
- Sahar Hussein al-Haideri (1962–2007), Iraqi journalist
- Sahar Khalifeh (born 1942), Palestinian writer
- Sahar Khoury (born 1973), American sculptor
- Sahar Nusseibeh (born 1987), American basketball coach
- Sahar Taha (born 1963), Iraqi musician
- Sahar Tawfiq (born 1951), Egyptian writer
- Sahar Valadbeigi (born 1978), Iranian actress
- Sahar Youssef (born 1968), Egyptian swimmer
- Sahar Zakaria (born 1973), Iranian actress
- Sahar Maher Abd al-Rashid, wife of Qusay Hussein

== Surname ==
- Ben Sahar (born 1995), Israeli football player
- Muhamad Hasik bin Sahar (born 1980), Singaporean convicted killer and gang member of Salakau
- Hailie Sahar (born 1988), American actress
