= Nadine Ghazi =

Egyptian footballer (born 2001)

Personal information
- Full name: Nadine Yasser Ezzat Ghazi
- Date of birth: 24 November 2001 (age 24)
- Position: Attacking midfielder

Team information
- Current team: Al Ahly FC
- Number: 7

College career
Years	Team	Apps	(Gls)
2018	AUC Futsal		

Senior career*
Years	Team	Apps	(Gls)
2014–2020	Kafr Saad		
2020–2022	El Gouna FC		
2022–2024	Pyramids FC		
2024–	Al Ahly FC		

International career
2016	Egypt U17	2	(0)
2019–2020	Egypt U20	2	(2)
2019	Egypt U21	2	(1)
2016–	Egypt		(10)
- * Club domestic league appearances and goals

Nadine Yasser Ezzat Ghazi (Arabic: نادين ياسر عزت غازي; born 24 November 2001), commonly known as Nadine Ghazi, (Note: Also spelled Nadin Ghazy, Nadeen Gazy, Nadine Ghazy.) is an Egyptian footballer who plays as an attacking midfielder for Egyptian Premier League side Al Ahly and the Egypt national football team.

== Club career ==
Ghazi began her football journey in Egypt at the age of 11, spending about a year with academies such as Atlético Madrid and Wadi Degla before taking a break from the sport. She later resumed her career at Aimz Academy, where she played for the first team from 2014 to 2020. The team underwent several name changes during that period, being known as Nogoom El Mostakbal (Arabic: نجوم المستقبل) in 2013, El Alameyeen (Arabic: الإعلاميين) from 2014 to 2019, and Kafr Saad from 2019 onwards. In 2020, the forward finished as the top scorer in the Egyptian Women's Premier League. She subsequently joined El Gouna for the 2021 season. In late December 2021, she suffered an ACL tear and underwent surgery, making her return to the pitch within three months.

In July 2024, Following the establishment of Al Ahly's women's football section, the club signed Nadine on a free transfer deal from Pyramids FC.

== International career ==
Ghazi received her first call-up to the senior Egypt women's national team in 2016 at the age of 14, scoring in her debut match her first international goal in an 8–0 victory over Libya during the 2016 Women's Africa Cup of Nations qualifiers. She was subsequently included in Egypt's final squad for the 2016 Women's Africa Cup of Nations in Cameroon but remained an unused substitute throughout the team's three group-stage matches.

Following her early involvement with the senior team, Ghazi continued her development at the youth level, representing Egypt in the Under-17, Under-20, and Under-21 categories in FIFA youth World Cups qualifiers and the UNAF regional tournaments.

In August 2022, she was selected for the Cleopatras squad for the 2021 Arab Women's Cup, hosted on home soil. During the tournament, she delivered standout performances, scoring a super hat-trick against Sudan, a goal against Lebanon, and a brace against Tunisia, playing a key role in Egypt's run to the semi-finals. That match was her last for the next three years and six months, before she made her comeback in March 2025 during a two-legged encounter against Jordan.

International goals

No.	Date	Venue	Opponent	Score	Result	Competition
1.	6 March 2016	Stade Olympique de Sousse, Sousse	Libya	7–0	8–0	2016 WAFCON qualification
2.	24 August 2022	Police Academy Stadium, Cairo	Sudan	2–0	10–0	2021 Arab Women's Cup
3.	24 August 2022	Police Academy Stadium, Cairo	Sudan	3–0	10–0	2021 Arab Women's Cup
4.	24 August 2022	Police Academy Stadium, Cairo	Sudan	5–0	10–0	2021 Arab Women's Cup
5.	24 August 2022	Police Academy Stadium, Cairo	Sudan	6–0	10–0	2021 Arab Women's Cup
6.	27 August 2022	Police Academy Stadium, Cairo	Lebanon	4–0	4–0	2021 Arab Women's Cup
7.	30 August 2022	Osman Ahmed Osman Stadium, Cairo	Tunisia	1–0	2–2	2021 Arab Women's Cup
8.	30 August 2022	Osman Ahmed Osman Stadium, Cairo	Tunisia	2–1	2–2	2021 Arab Women's Cup
9.	4 April 2025	Al Ahly Club Stadium, Nasr City	Jordan	2–0	3–0	Friendly
10.	8 April 2025	Al Ahly Club Stadium, Nasr City	Jordan	3–1	5–1	Friendly
