= Eman Hassan =

Egyptian footballer (born 2000)

Personal information
- Full name: Eman Hassan Abdelrahim Kassem
- Date of birth: 6 November 2000 (age 26)
- Place of birth: Egypt
- Position: Defender

Team information
- Current team: Al Ahly
- Number: 12

Senior career*
Years	Team	Apps	(Gls)
2013–2016	Health/El-Obour SC		
2016–2022	SC Aviation		
2022–2024	Al Hilal	23	(3)
2024–2025	Abha	5	(0)
2025–	Al Ahly		

International career^{‡}
2015–2016	Egypt U17	4	(0)
2019–2020	Egypt U20	0	(0)
2021–	Egypt	7	(0)
- * Club domestic league appearances and goals as of 17 November 2023 ‡ National team caps and goals as of 30 November 2021

Eman Hassan Abdelrahim Kassem (Arabic: إيمان حسن عبد الرحيم قاسم; born 6 November 2000) is an Egyptian professional footballer who plays as a defender for Egyptian Women's Premier League club Al Ahly and the Egypt national team.

== Club career ==
Hassan has been practicing athletics since the age of 7, and when she turned 13, she switched to football thanks to coach Mohammed Ayyad who noticed her and signed her up to join the ' Health/El-Obour SC' team.

=== Aviation: 2016–2022 ===
After being chosen for the national under-17 team, Hassan joined SC Aviation, a team based in Cairo. She played a crucial role in securing Aviation's inaugural women's league title, breaking Wadi Degla's streak of seven consecutive championships.

After her contract with Aviation expired, Hassan garnered attention from several clubs, including the Egyptian women's powerhouse Wadi Degla. She also received offers from clubs in Romania and Turkey.

=== Al Hilal: 2022–2024 ===
In October 2022, Hassan joined the newly acquired Al Hilal to participate in the inaugural season of Saudi Women's Premier League. On 21 October 2023, She debuted for Al Hilal in a scoreless draw against Al Yamamah. On 2 December, She scored her first goal for the club in the 46th minute in a 6–1 win against Al-Ahli. In July 2023, Al Hilal extended Hassan's contract for a one-season deal.

== International career ==
In 2016 Hassan was selected for the under-17 team to participate in the 2016 African U-17 Women's World Cup qualification. On 22 January 2016, She debuted for the team in a 6–0 win over Djibouti.

Hassan has appeared for under-20 team in several friendlies against Egyptian local clubs, however not a single competitive game was played.

In October 2021, Hassan got her first call-up to the Senior national team to participate in a double-legged 2022 Women's Africa Cup of Nations qualifying matches. On 11 April 2022 she made her debut in a scoreless draw against Jordan.

Hassan has represented Egpyt's women Minifootball team in the 2021 WMF Women's World Cup in Ukraine and has helped the team finish fourth overall.

== Career statistics ==
=== Club ===
As of match played 30 December 2023

Appearances and goals by club, season and competition
Club	Season	League			Cup		Continental		Other		Total	
Club	Season	Division	Apps	Goals	Apps	Goals	Apps	Goals	Apps	Goals	Apps	Goals
Al Hilal	2022–23	SWPL	13	3	–	–	—		—		13	3
Al Hilal	2023–24	SWPL	5	0	2	0	—		3	0	10	0
Al Hilal	Total		18	0	2	0	—		3	0	23	3
Career total			17	0	2	0	—		5	0	24	0

=== International ===
As of match played 5 December 2023

Appearances and goals by national team and year
National team	Year	Apps	Goals
Egypt	2022	3	0
Egypt	2023	4	0
Total		7	0

== Honours ==
Aviation

- Egyptian Women's Premier League: 2018–19
