= Salma Tarik =

Egyptian footballer (born 1989)

Personal information
- Full name: Salma Tarik Mohamed Abdelmotaleb Ahmed
- Date of birth: 22 November 1989 (age 36)
- Place of birth: Cairo, Egypt
- Position: Striker

College career
Years	Team	Apps	(Gls)
2007	Cal State Northridge		
2008–2010	Hofstra		

Senior career*
Years	Team	Apps	(Gls)
- Smouha

International career
2008–	Egypt	5	(1)

Managerial career
- 2016–: St. Joseph's–Long Island
- * Club domestic league appearances and goals

Salma Tarik Mohamed Abdelmotaleb Ahmed (born 22 November 1989) is an Egyptian international footballer who plays as a midfielder for the Egypt women's national football team. At the club level, she played for Smouha in Egypt.

== Early life and education ==
Born in Cairo, Egypt, Tarik immigrated to the United States when she turned six. She began college at California State University Northridge. She then graduated from Hofstra University in Long Island, New York. She has twin older brothers and one younger brother.

== Playing career ==
=== College ===
Tarik started her college career at California State University Northridge in 2007. She was a starting player in 17 out of 18 games, and made 3 goals during this year.

She then transferred to Hofstra University, where she played from 2008 to 2012. In her first year she played in every game, and tied for the most goals scored on her team. In 2009, she led her team in goals scored at 10 goals. By the time she graduated, she was the third highest scoring player in all of Hofstra history.

=== International ===
Tarik played for the Egypt women's national football team beginning in 2008. She played for the team during World Cup qualifying matches. She took part in Egypt's second ever appearance in the African Cup of Nations scoring in Egypt's milestone win over Zimbabwe, the country's first ever win in the competition.
