= Egyptian Women's Cup =

Egyptian Women's Cup كأس مصر للسيدات
- Organiser(s): Egyptian Football Association
- Founded: 1998; 28 years ago
- Region: Egypt
- Current champions: FC Masar (3nd title) (2025-26)
- Most championships: Goldi SC; Wadi Degla SC; FC Masar (3 titles each)
- 2025–26 W-Cup

The Egyptian Women's Cup (Arabic: كأس مصر للسيدات) is a women's association football competition in Egypt. pitting regional teams against each other. It was established in 1998.

== History ==
The competition started on 1998. The first winners was Goldi SC under the name of El Maaden LSC for the three first consecutive editions.

== Finals ==
Year	Winners	Score	Runners-up	Venue
1998–99	El Maaden LSC	1–0	Somuda LSC	
1999–00	El Maaden LSC	5–0	El Tayaran SC	
2000–01	El Maaden LSC	1–0	Smouha SC	
2001–02		–		
2002–03	Smouha SC	3–0	El Tayaran SC	
2003–04		–		
2004–05		–		
2005–06		–		
2006–07		–		
2007–08		–		
2008–09		–		
2009–10	Wadi Degla SC	2–0	El Dakhleya SC	
2010–11		–		
2011–12		–		
2012–13		–		
2013–14		–		
2014–15		–		
2015–16		–		
2016–17	Wadi Degla SC	0–0 (5–4 p)	Media Club El Aalamen	
2017–18		–		
2018–19		–		
2019–20	canceled in round of 16 because of the COVID-19 pandemic in Egypt			
2020–21	El Gouna FC	0–0 (5–4 p)	El Amrya Youth Center	
2021–22	Wadi Degla SC	2–1	Maadi Sporting and Yacht Club	
2022–23	Tutankhamun FC	2–1	El Amrya Youth Center	
2023–24	Tutankhamun FC	4–2	Wadi Degla SC	30 June Stadium, Cairo
2024–25	Al Ahly FC	1–0	Wadi Degla SC	Mit Okba Stadium, Giza
2025–26	FC Masar	3–2	Wadi Degla SC	Ceramica Cleopatra Ground, Giza

- Goldi SC (ex. El Maaden LSC)
- FC Masar (ex. Tutankhamun FC)

== See also ==
- Egyptian Women's Premier League
- Women's football in Egypt
