= Nadine Mohamed (footballer) =

Palestinian footballer (born 2003)

Personal information
- Date of birth: 7 October 2003 (age 23)
- Place of birth: Berlin, Germany
- Height: 1.60 m (5 ft 3 in)
- Position: Midfielder

Team information
- Current team: Al Ahly
- Number: 17

Senior career*
Years	Team	Apps	(Gls)
2020–2024	Türkiyemspor Berlin	54	(10)
2024–	Al Ahly	7	(0)

International career^{‡}
2023–	Palestine	11	(0)
- * Club domestic league appearances and goals as of 26 November 2024 ‡ National team caps and goals as of 29 November 2024

Nadine Mohamed (Arabic: نَادِين مُحَمَّد; born 7 October 2003) is a professional footballer who plays as a midfielder for Egyptian Women's Premier League club Al Ahly. Born in Germany, she plays for the Palestine national team.

== Early life ==
Nadine Mohamed grew up in a football-oriented family and began playing with her brother and neighborhood friends. Her father, a football coach, initially opposed her playing in a club due to traditional views about women in the sport. However, with her mother's support, Nadine joined a girls' team at Berliner AK 07, marking the start of her football career before eventually joining Türkiyemspor in 2020.

== Club career ==
In September 2024, Al Ahly announced the signing of Nadine Mohamed from Türkiyemspor Berlin to strengthen their women's team, which was preparing for its debut in the Women's Premier League.

== International career ==
In May 2023, Nadine received her first call-up to the Palestine national team for two friendly matches against Saudi Arabia. On 7 May 2023, she made her debut in a scoreless draw against the host Saudi Arabia. Since then, she has made several appearances for the Palestinian team, including being selected for the final squad of the 2024 WAFF Women's Championship.
