= Dana Nadda =

Egyptian footballer

Personal information
- Full name: Dana Karim Samir Nadda
- Date of birth: 14 November 2004 (age 21)
- Place of birth: Cairo, Egypt
- Height: 5 ft 7 in (1.70 m)
- Position: Attacking midfielder

Team information
- Current team: Southern Illinois Salukis
- Number: 10

College career
Years	Team	Apps	(Gls)
2023–2024	Fairfield Stags	38	(2)
2025	Southern Illinois Salukis	19	(6)

Senior career*
Years	Team	Apps	(Gls)
2019	Wadi Degla		

International career^{‡}
2020–2024	Egypt U20	8	(5)
2021–	Egypt	10	(3)
- * Club domestic league appearances and goals ‡ National team caps and goals as of 2 March 2026

Dana Karim Samir Nadda (Arabic: دانا كريم سمير ندا; born 14 November 2004) is an Egyptian college footballer who plays as a midfielder for the Southern Illinois Salukis and the Egypt women's national football team.

== College career ==
Prior to joining the Fairfield Stags, Nadda spent three years at IMG Academy in the United States, where she played for the academy's football programme while completing her secondary education. During her time there, she developed as a midfielder and gained experience in competitive youth football.

Following her graduation from IMG Academy, Nadda received a full scholarship from Fairfield University to join its NCAA Division I women's soccer programme. She subsequently joined the Fairfield Stags on a four-year collegiate programme beginning with the 2023 season.

Nadda joined the Fairfield Stags in 2023 and started three of her 17 appearances during her freshman season, playing a total of 529 minutes. She scored her first collegiate goal from a free kick against Fordham on 3 September and recorded 13 shots overall, including two attempts in three separate matches. Her longest outing of the season came against Rider on 23 September, where she played 61 minutes and registered two shots, one of them on target. Following her goal against Fordham, Nadda was named the Metro Atlantic Athletic Conference (MAAC) Rookie of the Week, becoming the second Stag that season to receive a conference weekly award and the first to earn rookie honours.

During the 2024 season, she made 21 appearances, scoring one goal and registering a career-high five assists. She contributed to goals in three consecutive matches, beginning with a goal against Fordham on 1 September, followed by assists against Rider on 7 September and Iona on 14 September. All five assists came in MAAC play, with additional assists recorded against Niagara on 21 September, Manhattan on 5 October, and Marist on 23 October, helping the team win the 2024 MAAC women's soccer tournament.

== Club career ==
Nadda began her football journey at the Barcelona Academy in Cairo, Egypt, where she was the only girl training among boys, starting at the age of five. She later joined a private academy before moving to Wadi Degla, one of Egypt's top women's football clubs. At Degla, she competed in the Egyptian Women's Premier League, training and playing alongside the first team in competitive matches.

While at Degla, Nadda attracted international attention through her performances, which were recorded by her father and shared with foreign clubs. This led to a two-week trial with Chelsea in England, where her technical abilities and fitness impressed the coaching staff.

== International career ==
A native of Cairo, Egypt, Nadda holds three nationalities: American, Egyptian, and Lebanese.

Nadda began representing Egypt at the under-20 level following the re-establishment of the national team in 2019 ahead of the 2020 African U-20 Women's World Cup qualifiers. She made an immediate impact, scoring a rocket goal from a free-kick in a 5–3 defeat to Morocco on 17 January 2020. She later took part in the 2022 qualifying campaign, scoring Egypt's consolation goal in a 3–1 loss to Congo. In the 2024 cycle, she again faced Congo and scored in both legs as Egypt secured a 7–1 aggregate victory.

In August 2021, Danna received her first call-up to the senior national team for the final squad of the 2021 Arab Women's Cup, which was hosted on home soil and marked Egypt's first international matches in five years. On 27 August 2021, she scored her first international goal in a 4–0 win over Lebanon.

=== International goals ===
Egypt score listed first, score column indicates score after each Nadda goal.

No.	Date	Venue	Opponent	Score	Result	Competition
1	27 August 2021	Police Academy Stadium, Cairo, Egypt	Lebanon	2–0	4–0	2021 Arab Women's Cup
2	20 October 2021	Petro Sport Stadium, Cairo, Egypt	Tunisia	2–3	2–6	2022 WAFCON qualification
3	2 March 2026	EFA National Teams Center, Cairo, Egypt	Algeria	2–1	2–3	Friendly
