= Habiba Emad =

Egyptian footballer (born 2006)

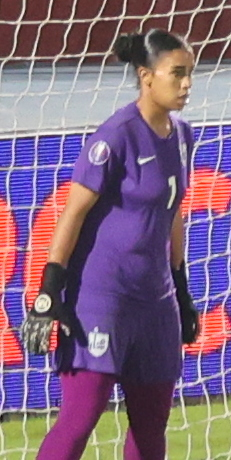
- Habiba Emad during 2024 CAF WCL

Personal information
- Full name: Habiba Emad Sabry Mohamed El Taher
- Date of birth: 8 January 2006 (age 20)
- Place of birth: Egypt
- Position: Goalkeeper

Team information
- Current team: FC Masar
- Number: 1

Senior career*
Years	Team	Apps	(Gls)
2023–	FC Masar	35	(0)

International career
2022–	Egypt U17	2	(0)
2022–	Egypt U20	9	(0)
2023–	Egypt	0	(0)
- * Club domestic league appearances and goals

Habiba Emad Sabry Mohamed El Taher (Arabic: حبيبة عماد صبري محمد الطاهر; born 8 January 2006) is an Egyptian professional footballer who plays as a goalkeeper for Egyptian Women's Premier League club FC Masar and the Egypt national team.

== Club career ==
By the end of the 2023–24 season, Habiba had already made history, achieving 21 clean sheets in 28 matches. In June 2024, Tutankhamun renewed her contract with a two-season deal. She competed with Masar in the 2024 CAF Women's Champions League, where she played a key role in securing a historic bronze medal for the team and earned the Best Goalkeeper award.

On 11 December 2024, Habiba was nominated for the 2024 CAF Awards Young Player of the Year.

At the 2026 CAF Women's Champions League, she registered two clean sheets in the tournament and was named in the group stage Best XI.

== International career ==
Representing Egypt internationally, Habiba has played at the U-17, U-20, and senior levels.

== Honours ==
FC Masar

- Egyptian Women's Premier League: 2024
- Egyptian Women's Cup: 2024
- CAF Women's Champions League third place: 2024

Individual

- CAF Women's Champions League Best Goalkeeper: 2024
- 2026 CAF Women's Champions League: Group Stage Best XI
