= Sahar El Hawari =

Egyptian football referee

- Born: November 19, 1958 (age 67)

Sahar El Hawari (Arabic: سحر الهواري; born 19 November 1958) is a former member of the Parliament of Egypt and a promoter of Women's football in Egypt. Sahar El Hawari became the first female member of the Egyptian Football Association, the first women's referee from North Africa, and a member of FIFA.

== Early life ==
El Hawari grew up fascinated about football. Her father, Ezzat El Hawari, was a former football player and international football referee. There was no women's football in the 1980s when she was in school. However, her father supported her, and told her it was not possible, but it was also not impossible, because he believed in her capabilities. She graduated from the American University in Cairo.

== Women's football ==
In 1993, after her father's death, El Hawari created her own football team. She opened the team to women in Egypt and nearby areas to join. She recruited several well-known retired football players as her coaching staff and toured Egypt in search of talented players. The players were accommodated in her own house, and she paid their salaries out-of-pocket. She also coached the players in her father's home in Cairo. She continued for five years at her own cost, but the team struggled for acceptance. Then, she began to submit her team in festivals and celebrations, with the help of her father's good relations.

El Hawari was criticized by the media and the public, as well as members of the Egyptian Football Association, for her attempts to include women in the game. Many Egyptians felt that the game should only be played by men and were shocked by the idea of women wearing shorts in public.

Her efforts to encourage women to play sports first culminated in 1998 when the Egypt women's national football team qualified for the Women's Africa Cup of Nations (WAFCON), the first edition of the competition. El Hawari headed the delegation of the Egyptian Football Federation and took the team to Nigeria. The Egyptian Minister of Youth appointed El Hawari as the first woman on the board of directors of the Egyptian Football Association. After the 1998 WAFCON, she was invited to join the FIFA Women's Committee. At the 2003 Women's World Cup in the United States, she was the official final observer from FIFA.

She has also been involved in promoting women's football across the Arab world, including work with the Bahrain Football Association, the UAE Football Association, and the University of Kuwait.

In 2006, Egypt competed in the Arab Women's Football Championship, which helped show how much Arab women participate in both society and football.

El Hawari was Africa's first female FIFA referee. She has also seen success training referees. In May 2012, the number of female referees in Egypt reached 42, more than any other country in Africa.

In 2016, Egypt qualified for the Women's Africa Cup of Nations for the second time in its history. After securing their first-ever win in the tournament in a 1–0 victory over Zimbabwe, they once again failed to make it out of the group stage.

== Fraud charges ==
In 2016, the High Administrative Court of Egypt ordered that the Egyptian Football Association board be dissolved, as the results of the 2012 board elections were invalid due to allegations of rigging. The lawsuit was filed in 2013 by Hermas Radwan, challenging the integrity of the voting process. The judgement was final and not open to appeal. Elections were held again in September 2016.

The Egyptian Football Association was once again dissolved by the High Administrative Court in 2017, due to the illegal nomination of board members Hazem El Hawari and Sahar El Hawari.

El Hawari was a member of the Parliament of Egypt. In 2017, El Hawari received a five-year sentence on charges of fraudulent bankruptcy. Her membership in Parliament was subsequently dropped, as her indictment was at odds with Parliament's code of morals and internal regulations. El Hawari's departure affected the Egypt national women's football team, as training time and resource allocation were reduced.
