= Maha Shehata =

Egyptian footballer (born 1989)

Maha Al-Demerdash
Personal information
- Full name: Maha Al-Demerdash Al-Demerdash Shehata
- Date of birth: 13 February 1989 (age 37)
- Place of birth: Gharbia Governorate, Egypt
- Position: Goalkeeper

Team information
- Current team: Piros Security

Senior career*
Years	Team	Apps	(Gls)
- Wadi Degla SC
2017–2018	Trabzon İdmanocağı	16	(0)
- Piros Security
2024–	Al Ahly Women	1	(0)

International career
- Egypt
- * Club domestic league appearances and goals as of 18 April 2018

Maha Al-Demerdash Al-Demerdash Shehata (Arabic: مها الدمردش الدمرداش شحاته; born 13 February 1989) is an Egyptian footballer who plays as a goalkeeper for Egyptian club Al Ahly Women and the Egypt women's national team.

Her nickname is "The Beast."

== Early life ==
Al-Demerdash was born on 13 February 1989 in Gharbia Governorate, Egypt. She began playing football with the boys in the street and has loved football since childhood, despite rejection from her family and her community.

She began her career as a right-back, playing in that position for five years, before becoming a goalkeeper.

== Club career ==
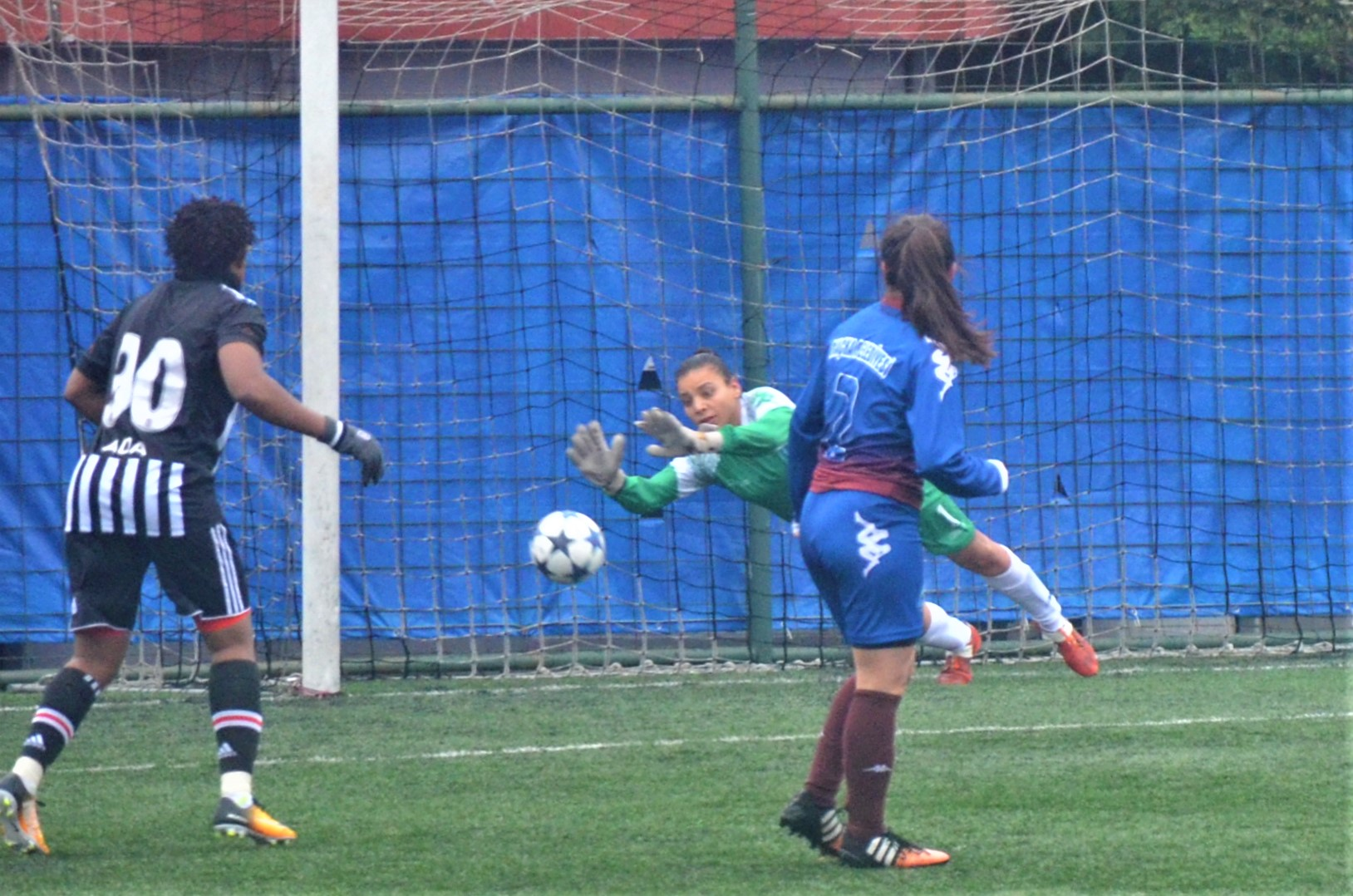
Maha Al-Demerdash (green) of Trabzon İdmanocağı (navy/maron) saving a shot in their away match against Beşiktaş J.K. (black/white) in the 2017–18 Turkish Women's First League.

Al-Demerdash joined Al-Mansoura at 17. She won Best Goalkeeper in the Egyptian Women's Premier League in 2010, and was similarly named the best goalkeeper in the Egyptian Women's Cup. The team was frozen in 2011.

She then moved to the Cairo-based team Wadi Degla SC. She was influenced by the men's team's captain and goalkeeper Essam El-Hadary. Al-Demerdash won six league championships and five Egyptian Women's Cups with the team. She won the award for Best Goalkeeper twice more with Wadi Degla.

In November 2017, she moved to Turkey to join Trabzon İdmanocağı, who play in the Turkish Women's First Football League. There, she played with fellow Egypt international Engy Attia.

Al-Demerdash returned to the Egyptian League and joined Al-Amerya during the 2021–22 season, but faced struggles with registration.

She then moved to the team Piros Security in Liga I in Romania. She became the first Egyptian player to wear the captain's armband in a European stadium.

== International career ==
Al-Demerdash appeared for the Egypt women's national football team at the 2016 Women's Africa Cup of Nations held in Cameroon.

She was called up for training and friendlies in preparation for qualifiers for the 2024 Women's African Cup of Nations. The goalkeeping coach, Mohamed Arafat, expressed his satisfaction with Al-Demerdash's level of play.

Al-Demerdash is one of the captains of the Egypt women's national team.

She has said one of her biggest dreams is to lead Egypt in the World Cup as a player or a coach.

== Personal life ==
Al-Demerdash's sister Karima died in early 2023.

Her family became more accepting of football because of her achievements, including winning titles with Wadi Degla and playing on the national team.

Her goalkeeping heroes are Manuel Neuer and Mohamed El Shenawy.
