= Menna Tarek =

Egyptian footballer (born 2000)

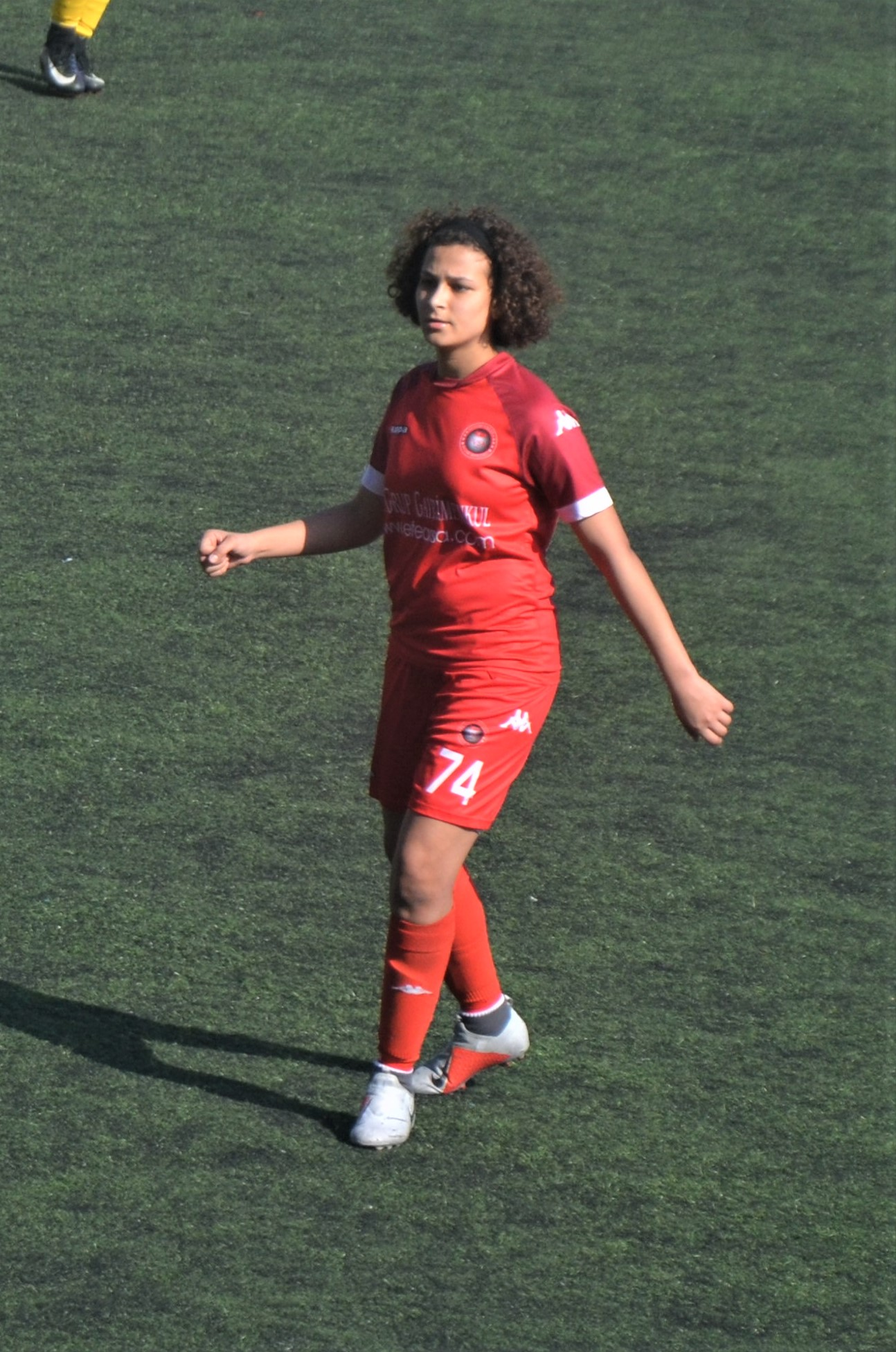
- Menna Tarek of Fatih Vatan Spor (February 2019)

Personal information
- Full name: Noha Tarek Sayed Saber
- Date of birth: 1 March 2000 (age 26)
- Place of birth: Cairo, Egypt
- Position: Forward

Team information
- Current team: Al Ahly

Senior career*
Years	Team	Apps	(Gls)
2018–2019	Fatih Vatan Spor	14	(2)
2019–2022	El Gouna		
2022–2023	Al-Shabab	13	(15)
2023–2024	Al Wehda		
2024	Al-Taqadom		
2024	Phoenix (Futsal)		
2024–	Al Ahly	1	(0)

International career
- Egypt
- * Club domestic league appearances and goals as of April 28, 2019

Noha Tarek Sayed Saber (Arabic: نهى طارق; born 1 March 2000), known as Menna Tarek, is an Egyptian footballer who plays as a forward for Egyptian club Al Ahly and the Egypt women's national team.

== Early life ==
Tarek was born in Cairo, Egypt on 1 March 1999.

== Club career ==
Tarek began playing football at age six. She signed to the club El-Dakhleya at age 10, winning the best player in the competition award her first three seasons.

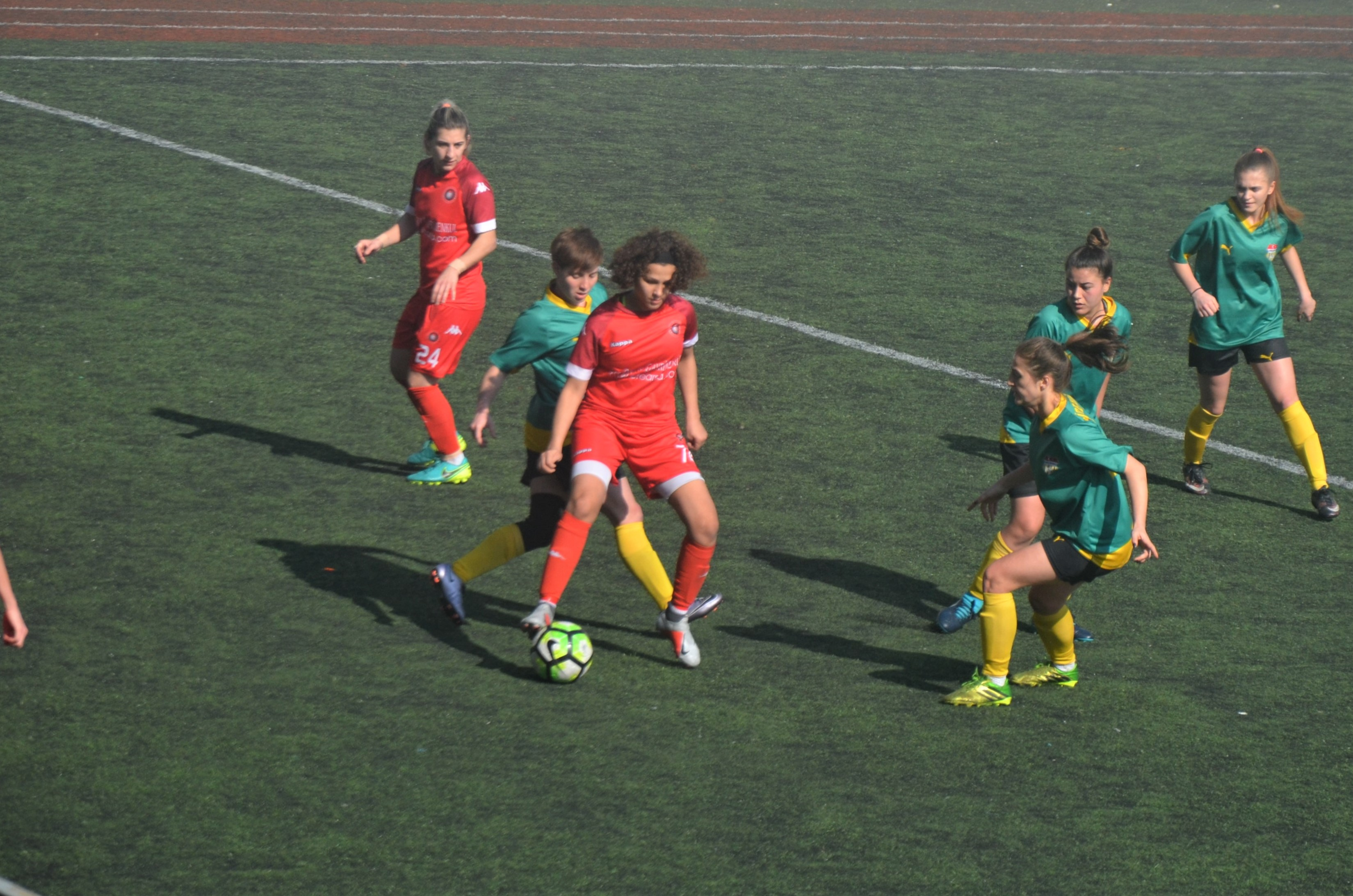
Menna Tarek (red) playing the ball for Fatih Vatan Spor in the home match of the 2018-19 Turkish Women's First Football League season against Kireçburnu Spor.

After receiving her first cap for the national team, Tarek signed for Wadi Degla. Tarek moved in November 2018 to Turkey to join Fatih Vatan Spor, who play in the Turkish Women's Football Super League. She scored one goal in the first match with her new club. Following her time in Turkey, Tarek returned to Egypt to play for El Gouna.

Tarek signed with Al Shabab in the Saudi Women's Premier League for the 2022–23 season. She scored upon her debut, a 4–2 loss to Al-Hilal on 14 October 2022. She scored the decisive goal in Al-Shabab's first win, a 2–1 victory over Al-Ahli. Tarek scored 15 goals over the course of the season. The team finished third in the league.

In 2023, Tarek signed for Al Wehda in the Saudi Women's First Division League.

In January 2024, she moved to Al-Taqadom, which reached fourth place in the Saudi Women's First Division League

Phoenix Club announced its contract with Tarek on 9 May 2024 to play with them in the Saudi Women's Futsal Tournament 2024.

She won the top scorer award in the 2024 Saudi Women's Futsal Tournament after she contributed to her Al-Ankaa team achieving fourth place.

== International career ==
At Age 13, Tarek was called up to the U-17 Egyptian national team, the first women's youth national team in Egypt. Tarek captained both Egypt's U-17 and U-20 national teams. She was the top scorer in 2016 African U-17 Women's World Cup qualifying.

Tarek appeared for the Egypt women's national football team at the 2016 Africa Women Cup of Nations held in Cameroon.

== Personal life ==
Tarek has cited Mohamed Salah, Neymar, and Marta as role models. She has stated Bayern Munich is her favorite team and it would be her dream to play for them.
