= Amany Rashad =

Egyptian footballer (born 1983)

Amany Rashad Abdelaal Mohamed (born 1 July 1983) is a football player for the Egyptian national women's team. As of 2011, she plays for Wadi Degla FC.
