= Sarah Essam =

Egyptian footballer (born 1999)

Personal information
- Full name: Sarah Essam Hassanin
- Date of birth: 6 April 1999 (age 27)
- Place of birth: Cairo, Egypt
- Positions: Midfielder; winger; forward

Team information
- Current team: Pyrgos AFC

Youth career
- Wadi Degla

Senior career*
Years	Team	Apps	(Gls)
2014–2017	Wadi Degla		
2017–2022	Stoke City Reserves	11	(2)
2022	Stoke City	1	(0)
2022–2023	Fundación Albacete	0	(0)
2023–2024	Rugby Borough	14	(1)
2025	Halifax	8	(2)
2025–2026	Hull City	3	(0)
2026–	Pyrgos		

International career
- Egypt U17
- Egypt
- * Club domestic league appearances and goals

Sarah Essam Mohamed Salah Eldin Mohamed Hassanin (Arabic: سارة عصام; born 6 April 1999) is the first Egyptian female to play football in the UK and Spain. Chosen as FIFA’s official Ambassador for World Cup Qatar 2022. She plays as a winger and attacker for Pyrgos AFC in the Greek A Division and the Egypt women's national team.

== College career ==
Essam enrolled in the University of Derby where she studied civil engineering. She also played for her university team, alongside Stoke, and was awarded a football scholarship for her senior year.

== Club career ==
Essam played soccer with her siblings when she was a child and also played basketball. She joined the academy at Wadi Degla. She made her debut for the first team at age 15 and was the youngest player in the Egyptian Women's Premier League.

After playing in Egypt, Essam became the first Egyptian woman to play competitive football in the UK when she signed with Stoke City in 2017. She also tried out at Sunderland, Derby County, and Birmingham. In 2018–19, she was the Stoke City Ladies' Development Team's top scorer, scoring 12 goals in 12 matches and receiving their Golden Boot award. During the COVID-19 pandemic, the English FA's Women's National League season results were expunged, and Essam returned to Egypt to train.

In 2022, she signed with Fundacion Albacete in the Primera Federacion, the second division of Spanish women's football.

In 2023, she signed with Rugby Borough as part of the team's rebranding efforts.

== International career ==
Essam played with the Egypt U-17 national team in 2016 World Cup qualifiers. At age 16, she was called up to the national team in 2016 to participate in 2016 Women's Africa Cup of Nations qualifiers, before being dropped for the tournament itself.

Essam featured in Egypt's third-place finish at the 2021 Arab Women's Cup, scoring one goal in Egypt's 2-5 semifinal defeat to Jordan.

She was called up for 2024 Women's Africa Cup of Nations qualification in September 2023. She scored in both legs of Egypt's 8-0 aggregate victory over South Sudan.

== Personal life ==
Essam's brother Mostafa is a former goalkeeper for Al Mokawloon.

Essam's elder sister Salma is founder of fashion brand called setta.6 Setta While her other sister Sophie is an engineering graduate.

In 2018, Essam was received the Arab Woman of the Year: Achievement in Sport award by the Arab Federation in London.

She served as part of the BBC's commentating team for the 2017 CAF Award ceremony, the 2019 Women's World Cup and the 2019 Africa Cup of Nations.

Essam was an ambassador for the 2022 World Cup, working alongside David Beckham.

Essam also signed with Adidas, making her the first Egyptian footballer the sporting giant has signed.

== Career statistics ==
No.	Date	Venue	Opponent	Score	Result	Competition
1.	19 February 2023	Fouad Chehab Stadium, Jounieh, Lebanon	Lebanon	2–0	2–1	Friendly
