= Women's football in Egypt =

Women's sport in Egypt

- Country: Egypt
- Governing body: Egyptian Football Association
- National team: Women's national team

International competitions
- Olympics; FIFA Women's World Cup (National Team); Africa Women Cup of Nations (National Team)

Football in Egypt has traditionally been played by men as women were prevented from participating in sports.

Madame Sahar El Hawari is one of the innovators of Egyptian football helping form the Egypt women's national football team and then going to the women's African cup of Nations.

== National League ==
In 2000 a women's Egyptian league was set up.

=== National team ===
FIFA has assessed the Egypt women's national football team and stated that the women footballers are good but could be better technically.

Many women experience prejudice for playing the sport. However, Sarah Essam became the first Egyptian to play in Europe for Stoke City in 2017.

== See also ==
- Football in Egypt
- Egypt women's national football team
