= Al Ahly FC Women =

- Full name: Al Ahly Women's Football Club
- Nicknames: Nadi El Watanniyah (Club of Patriotism); El Shayateen El Homr (The Red Devils); El Maared El Ahmar (The Red Giant); El Qalaa El Hamraa (The Red Castle)
- Short name: ASC, AFC, AHL
- Founded: 2 September 2021; 5 years ago
- Ground: Al Ahly Ground Fifth Settlement Stadium
- Chairman: Mahmoud El Khatib
- Manager: Ahmed Ramadan
- League: Egyptian Women's Premier League
- Website: https://www.alahlyegypt.com/en
Home colours	Away colours

Al Ahly Women's Football Club (Arabic: النادي الأهلي لكرة القدم سيدات), commonly known as Al Ahly FC Women, is an Egyptian professional sports club based in Cairo, Egypt. The club is mainly known for its professional football team which currently plays in the Egyptian Women's Premier League, the highest tier in the Egyptian football league system.

== History ==
=== Formation (2021) ===
On 2 September 2021, Al Ahly announced that it started their own women's football team by accepting applications from young girls aged four to 20-years-old to help them form their first women's football team.

On 26 June 2023, Al Ahly Club's Board of Directors decided to establish a junior women's football team in the club as a beginning to prepare a basic team to participate in the tournaments organized by the Football Association for women's football.

=== Senior Team and the first season ===
On 15 July 2024, Amir Tawfik, Acting CEO of Al-Ahly Football Company and Director of Contracts, announced the appointment of Frenchman Dimitri Lipoff as technical director of the women's football team for a period of three years.

On 28 July 2024, Al Ahly signed the duo Nadine Ghazi and Omnia Samir to support the women's football team in the Premier League for the 2024–2025 season to become the first two players in the women first team.

== Kits and crest ==
Football club kit crest
2023–

2024–25 Home	2024–25 Away	2025–26 Home	2025–26 Away

== Players ==
As of 9 March 2026

Note: Flags indicate national team as defined under FIFA eligibility rules; some limited exceptions apply. Players may hold more than one non-FIFA nationality.

No.	Pos.	Nation	Player
1	GK	EGY	Maha El Demerdash (Captain)
2	DF	EGY	Rodiena Abdelrasol
3	DF	PLE	Sara Kord
4	DF	EGY	Noura Khaled
5	DF	SRB	Aleksandra Đorđević
6	MF	PLE	Lolo Nasr
7	MF	EGY	Nadine Ghazi
8	FW	CMR	Brenda Tabe
9	FW	USA	Mia Darden
10	FW	EGY	Habiba Essam
11	FW	EGY	Menna Tarek
12	DF	EGY	Eman Hassan

No.	Pos.	Nation	Player
13	GK	EGY	Wafaa Rabee
14	DF	EGY	Soria Ashraf
16	GK	EGY	Esraa El Saka
17	MF	PLE	Nadine Mohamed
19	FW	GHA	Mercy Attobrah (injured)
20	DF	EGY	Habiba Omar
22	FW	EGY	Asmaa Aly
23	GK	EGY	Azza Fouly
24	MF	EGY	Omneya Samir
27	FW	PLE	Nour Youssef
40	FW	EGY	Ashrekt Adel
74	FW	EGY	Camilia El Deeb

== Managerial history ==
Below is a list of Al Ahly Women coaches from 2024 until the present day :

Name	Nat.	From	To	Honours
Dimitri Lipoff	France	15 July 2024	23 May 2026	1 Egyptian Women's Cup
Ahmed Ramadan	Egypt	4 June 2026	Current	

== Honours ==
=== Domestic ===
- Egyptian Women's Cup

Winners (1) : 2024–25

== Cairo Derby meetings ==
=== Key ===
Colors

Al Ahly win
Draw
Zamalek win

=== League ===
These are the meetings in the Egyptian Women's Premier League.

Season	Home team	Result	Away team
2024–25	Zamalek	1-2	Al Ahly
2024–25	Zamalek	0-0	Al Ahly
2025–26	Al Ahly	5-0	Zamalek
2025–26	Zamalek	0-3	Al Ahly
2026–27	Zamalek	0-6	Al Ahly
2026–27	Al Ahly	V	Zamalek

Al Ahly wins	Draws	Zamalek wins
4	1	0

=== Cup ===
These are the meetings in the Egyptian Women's Cup.

Al Ahly wins	Draws	Zamalek wins
0	0	0

=== Super Cup ===
Al Ahly wins	Draws	Zamalek wins
0	0	0

== See also ==
- Al Ahly SC
- Al Ahly Women's Volleyball
- Al Ahly Women's Basketball
- Al Ahly Women's Handball
- Al-Ahly TV
