= FC Masar (women) =

Women's football club in Cairo, Egypt

- Full name: Football Club Masar
- Short name: FCM,
- Founded: 2019; 7 years ago as Tutankhamun FC; 25 September 2024; 20 months ago as FC Masar
- Ground: Cairo, Egypt
- Chairman: Sir Mohamed Mansour
- Manager: Abdelrahman Ayed
- League: Egyptian Women's Premier League
- 2024–25: Champions

Football Club Masar (women) (Arabic: نادي مسار لكرة القدم (سيدات)) is an Egyptian women's football club based in Cairo. The club was established in 2019 under the name Tutankhamun FC, before rebranding to its current name in 2024. The club currently plays in the Egyptian Women's Premier League.

== History ==
The club was founded in 2019 under the name of Tutankhamun FC by Taher Mohamed, an international player of Al Ahly. In 2021, the club was acquired by Right to Dream Egypt, owned by businessman Sir Mohamed Mansour. On 25 September 2024, the club was rebranded and changed their name to FC Masar.

The club qualified for the 2024 CAF Women's Champions League for the first time in their history on 15 October 2024, despite finishing second in the UNAF Women's Champions League Qualifiers, following CAF's announcement that Morocco would host the finals. They were able to obtain third place in the tournament after their victory on penalties against Edo Queens F.C.

== Honours ==
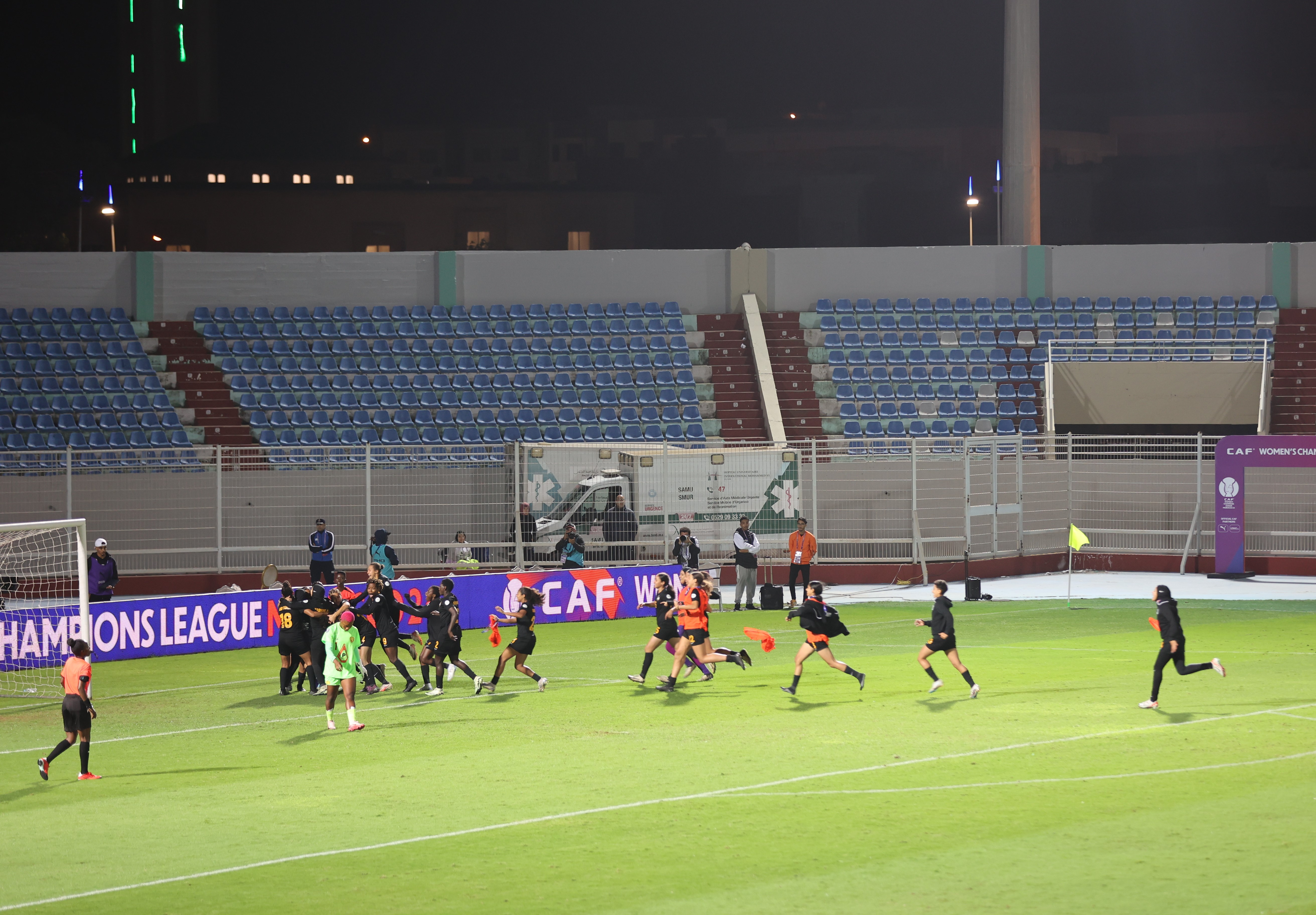
Players' celebrations after winning 3rd place in the CAF WCL.

- Egyptian Women's Premier League

Winners (3): 2024, 2025, 2026

- Egyptian Women's Cup

Winners (3): 2023, 2024, 2026

- CAF Women's Champions League

Third place (1): 2024

== Performance in CAF competitions ==
- CAF Women's Champions League: 2 appearance

2024 – Third Place
2025 – Fourth Place

== See also ==
- Egyptian Women's Premier League
