= Wadi Degla SC (women) =

Women's football club in Cairo, Egypt

Wadi Degla
- Full name: Wadi Degla Sporting Club
- Nickname(s): Community of Champions مجتمع الأبطال
- Short name: WDG
- Founded: 2007 (18 years ago)
- Ground: Egypt
- League: Egyptian Women's Premier League
- 2020–21: Egyptian Women's Premier League, 1st of 9 (champions)
| Home colours | Away colours |

Wadi Degla Sporting Club (Women) (Arabic: نادي وادي دجلة الرياضي) is an Egyptian women's football club based in Cairo. The club is related to Wadi Degla Holding, a construction company established in 1994.

The club has won the Egyptian Women's Premier League a record 12 times. The club is affiliated to men's team of Wadi Degla SC who have been playing in the Egyptian Premier League since the 2009–10 season.

== Players ==
=== Current squad ===
As of 16 August 2022

Note: Flags indicate national team as defined under FIFA eligibility rules; some limited exceptions apply. Players may hold more than one non-FIFA nationality.

| No. | Pos. | Nation | Player |
|---|---|---|---|
| — | GK | (Egypt) EGY | Elham Eid |
| — | GK | (Egypt) EGY | Farah Samir |
| — | GK | (Algeria) ALG | Hiname Di'ene |
| — | DF | (Egypt) EGY | Basant Abdelaziz |
| — | DF | (Egypt) EGY | Yasmin Samir |
| — | DF | (Egypt) EGY | Amira Ashraf |
| — | DF | (Egypt) EGY | Esraa Ahmed |
| — | DF | (Egypt) EGY | Aya Mahmoud |
| — | DF | (United States) USA | Catlin Miller |
| — | DF | (United States) USA | Chloe May Lamenzo |
| — | MF | (Egypt) EGY | Amany Rashad |
| — | MF | (Egypt) EGY | Engy Atya |
| — | MF | (Egypt) EGY | Omnia Mahmoud |
| — | MF | (Egypt) EGY | Sherouk El Sayed |
| — | MF | (Egypt) EGY | Marwa Tawfik |

| No. | Pos. | Nation | Player |
|---|---|---|---|
| — | MF | (Egypt) EGY | Dana Nadda |
| — | MF | (Egypt) EGY | Gihan Mamdouh |
| — | MF | (Egypt) EGY | Noha El Solh |
| — | MF | (Egypt) EGY | Hayam Abdelhafez |
| — | MF | (Egypt) EGY | Marwa Talat |
| — | MF | (Egypt) EGY | Maya Ehab |
| — | MF | (United States) USA | Nikole Villarin |
| — | FW | (Egypt) EGY | Noha Tarek |
| — | FW | (Egypt) EGY | Manar Hany |
| — | FW | (Egypt) EGY | Sarah Essam |
| — | FW | (Egypt) EGY | Marihan Yehia |
| — | FW | (The Gambia) GAM | Fatumata Dukureh |
| — | FW | (Egypt) EGY | Nada El Gharib |
| — | FW | (Egypt) EGY | Asmaa Ali |
| — | FW | (United States) USA | Jasmin Zachwieja |

== Honours ==
=== Domestic ===
League titles

- Egyptian Women's Premier League
  - Winners (record) (14): 2008, 2009, 2010, 2012, 2013, 2014, 2015, 2016, 2017, 2018, 2020, 2021, 2022, 2023
- Egyptian Women's Cup
  - Winners (record) (3): 2010, 2017, 2022
- Egyptian Women's Super Cup
  - Winners (1): 2023

=== Continental ===
- UNAF Women's Champions League
  - Winners (1): 2022

== See also ==
- Wadi Degla SC
- Egyptian Women's Premier League
