= Egyptian Women's Premier League =

- Organising body: Egyptian Football Association
- Founded: 1998
- Country: Egypt
- Confederation: CAF
- Number of clubs: 14
- Relegation to: Regional Leagues
- Domestic cup: Egyptian Women's Cup
- International cup: CAF W-Champions League
- Current champions: FC Masar (3nd title) (2025–26)
- Most championships: Wadi Degla (14 titles)
- Current: 2026–27

The Egyptian Women's Premier League (Arabic: الدوري المصري الممتاز للسيدات) is the top flight of women's association football in Egypt. The competition is run by the Egyptian Football Association.

== History ==
The championship was created in 1998. Maaden LFC won the first championship as well as the next three. The competition was stopped from 2003 to 2007. The championship was dominated after by Wadi Degla with ten consecutive titles from 2008 to 2018. The championship was abandoned during the 2010–2011 season due to the Egyptian revolution of 2011 but returned one season after.

== Champions ==
The list of champions and runners-up:

Year	Champions	Runners-up
1998–99	El Maaden LSC	
1999–00	El Maaden LSC	Smouha SC
2000–01	El Maaden LSC	Smouha SC
2001–02	Goldi LSC	Aviation SC
2002–03	Smouha SC	Aviation SC
2003–04	cancelled	
2004–05	cancelled	
2005–06	cancelled	
2006–07	cancelled	
2007–08	Wadi Degla	Aviation SC
2008–09	Wadi Degla	
2009–10	Wadi Degla	Smad Talkha SC
2010–11	abandoned	
2011–12	Wadi Degla	
2012–13	Wadi Degla	
2013–14	Wadi Degla	
2014–15	Wadi Degla	Aviation SC
2015–16	Wadi Degla	Aviation SC
2016–17	Wadi Degla	Aviation SC
2017–18	Wadi Degla	Aviation SC
2018–19	Aviation SC	Wadi Degla
2019–20	Wadi Degla	Kafr Saad SC
2020–21	Wadi Degla	El Gouna FC
2021–22	Wadi Degla	El Gouna FC
2022–23	Wadi Degla	Markaz Shabab Al-Amerya
2023–24	FC Masar	Wadi Degla
2024–25	FC Masar	Al Ahly FC
2025–26	FC Masar	Al Ahly FC

== Most successful clubs ==
Rank	Club	Champions	Winning seasons
1	Wadi Degla	14	2008, 2009, 2010, 2012, 2013, 2014, 2015, 2016, 2017, 2018, 2020, 2021, 2022, 2023
2	Goldi LSC	4	1999, 2000, 2001, 2002
3	FC Masar	3	2024, 2025, 2026
4	Smouha SC	1	2003
4	Aviation SC	1	2019

- Rq:

Goldi LSC (ex. El Maaden LSC)
FC Masar (ex. Tutankhamun FC)

== Goalscorers ==
Season	Player	Team	Goals
2022–23	(Burundi) Sandrine Niyonkuru	Masar	19
2023–24	(Burundi) Sandrine Niyonkuru	Masar	66
2024–25	(Burundi) Sandrine Niyonkuru	Masar	26

Most time top scorer

- 2 times.
  - (Burundi) Sandrine Niyonkuru (2022–23 and 2023–24).

Most goals scored by a player in a single season

- 66 goals.
  - (Burundi) Sandrine Niyonkuru (2023–24).

== See also ==
- Egyptian Women's Cup
- Women's football in Egypt
