= 2022 Women's Africa Cup of Nations Group B =

Football tournament group stage

Group B of 2022 Africa Women Cup of Nations was played from 3 to 9 July 2022. The group was made up of Cameroon, Zambia, Tunisia and debutants Togo.

== Teams ==
Draw position	Team	Pot	Federation	Method of qualification	Date of qualification	Finals appearance	Last appearance	Previous best performance	FIFA Rankings										
Draw position	Team	Pot	Federation	Method of qualification	Date of qualification	Finals appearance	Last appearance	Previous best performance	FIFA Rankings	B1	Cameroon	Seed	UNIFFAC	2022 Africa Women Cup of Nations qualification winner	23 February 2022	13th	2018	Runners-up (1991, 2004, 2014, 2016)	54
B2	Zambia	1	COSAFA	2022 Africa Women Cup of Nations qualification winner	22 February 2022	4th	2018	Quarter-finals (1995)	103										
B3	Tunisia	1	UNAF	2022 Africa Women Cup of Nations qualification winner	23 February 2022	2nd	2008	Group stage (2008)	72										
B4	Togo	1	WAFU	2022 Africa Women Cup of Nations qualification winner	23 February 2022	1st	—	Debut	118										

== Standings ==
Pos	Team	Pld	W	D	L	GF	GA	GD	Pts	Qualification
1	Zambia	3	2	1	0	5	1	+4	7	Knockout stage
2	Cameroon	3	1	2	0	3	1	+2	5	Knockout stage
3	Tunisia	3	1	0	2	4	4	0	3	Knockout stage
4	Togo	3	0	1	2	3	9	−6	1	

Source: CAF (archived)
Rules for classification: Group stage tiebreakers

== Matches ==
=== Cameroon vs Zambia ===
3 July 2022
18:00

Cameroon	0–0	Zambia
	Report (FIFA); Report (CAF)

Stade Mohammed V, Casablanca
Referee: Aïssata Boudy Lam (Note: Referee Aïssata Boudy Lam was replaced by fourth official Lidya Tafesse (Ethiopia) due to injury at the 64th minute.) (Mauritania)

Cameroon

Team stats
Cameroon	Statistic	Zambia
6	Shots	11
2	Shots on target	2
60%	Possession	40%
338	Passes	232
71%	Pass accuracy	56%
18	Fouls	9
0	Yellow cards	1
0	Red cards	0
5	Offsides	2
5	Corners	2

Zambia

Formation: 4–3–1–2
GK	16	Ange Bawou
RB	12	Claudine Meffometou	(substituted off) 87'
CB	11	Aurelle Awona
CB	6	Estelle Johnson
LB	15	Colette Ndzana
CM	14	Monique Ngock	(substituted off) 76'
CM	22	Michaela Abam	(substituted off) 46'
CM	10	Jeannette Yango
AM	20	Genevieve Ngo Mbeleck	(substituted off) 46'
CF	3	Ajara Nchout
CF	7	Gabrielle Onguéné	(substituted off) 87'
Substitutions:
FW	9	Flora Kameni	(substituted on) 46'
MF	8	Fadimatou Kome	(substituted on) 46'
MF	17	Brigitte Omboudou	(substituted on) 76'
DF	2	Easther Mayi Kith	(substituted on) 87'
DF	4	Catherine Mbengono	(substituted on) 87'
Manager:
Gabriel Zabo

Formation: 4–3–3
GK	16	Hazel Nali
RB	8	Margaret Belemu
CB	15	Agness Musase
CB	3	Lushomo Mweemba
LB	13	Martha Tembo		(substituted off) 81'
CM	14	Ireen Lungu
CM	12	Evarine Katongo
CM	10	Grace Chanda	(yellow card) 90+5'
RF	21	Avell Chitundu
CF	7	Misozi Zulu
LF	6	Mary Wilombe		(substituted off) 82'
Substitutions:
DF	4	Esther Siamfuko		(substituted on) 81'
FW	22	Natasha Nanyangwe		(substituted on) 82'
Manager:
Bruce Mwape

=== Tunisia vs Togo ===
3 July 2022
21:00

Tunisia	4–1	Togo
Houij 1'; Ellouzi 12', 60'; Amouklou 71' (o.g.)	Report (FIFA); Report (CAF)	Gnintegma 22' (pen.)

Stade Mohammed V, Casablanca
Referee: Antsino Twanyanyukwa (Namibia)

Tunisia

Team stats
Tunisia	Statistic	Togo
7	Shots	8
5	Shots on target	4
52%	Possession	48%
272	Passes	269
65%	Pass accuracy	62%
14	Fouls	9
1	Yellow cards	1
0	Red cards	1
2	Offsides	2
2	Corners	2

Togo

Formation: 4–1–2–1–2
GK	16	Soulaima Jabrani
RB	14	Ghada Ayadi
CB	6	Rania Aouina
CB	4	Chaima Abbassi		(substituted off) 89'
LB	18	Samia Aouni
DM	19	Chirine Lamti
RM	8	Sabrine Mamay	(yellow card) 21'	(substituted off) 82'
LM	17	Imen Troudi
AM	7	Ella Kaabachi
CF	10	Meriem Houij		(substituted off) 79'
CF	9	Sabrine Ellouzi		(substituted off) 89'
Substitutions:
MF	21	Soumaya Laamiri		(substituted on) 79'
MF	13	Yasmine Jemai		(substituted on) 79'
MF	12	Ibtissem Ben Mohamed		(substituted on) 82'
FW	15	Hanna Hamdi		(substituted on) 89'
DF	5	Jasmina Barhoumi		(substituted on) 89'
Manager:
Samir Landolsi

Formation: 4–2–3–1
GK	16	Amé Amouklou
RB	17	Akossiwa Dogbé		(substituted off) 78'
CB	5	Ayawoa Kaglan
CB	4	Ella Djankalé	(red card) 54'
LB	14	Akoko Assigno
CM	12	Nathalie Badate	(yellow card) 58'
CM	6	Reine Gaké
RW	13	Koudjoukalo Sama		(substituted off) 85'
AM	8	Odette Gnintegma		(substituted off) 85'
LW	11	Mafille Woedikou
CF	26	Tayla Gacé		(substituted off) 67'
Substitutions:
DF	19	Yawa Konou		(substituted on) 78'
MF	3	Riféla Dogli		(substituted on) 85'
MF	7	Takiyatou Yaya		(substituted on) 85'
MF	9	Amiratou N'djambara		(substituted on) 67'
Manager:
Kaï Tomety

=== Zambia vs Tunisia ===
6 July 2022
18:00

Zambia	1–0	Tunisia
Chitundu 90+2'	Report (FIFA); Report (CAF)

Stade Mohammed V, Casablanca
Referee: Maria Rivet (Mauritius)

Zambia

Team stats
Zambia	Statistic	Tunisia
24	Shots	7
5	Shots on target	5
50%	Possession	50%
306	Passes	319
65%	Pass accuracy	64%
14	Fouls	12
2	Yellow cards	0
0	Red cards	0
2	Offsides	1
6	Corners	2

Tunisia

Formation: 4–2–3–1
GK	16	Hazel Nali
RB	8	Margaret Belemu
CB	15	Agness Musase	(yellow card) 60'
CB	3	Lushomo Mweemba
LB	13	Martha Tembo
DM	14	Ireen Lungu	(yellow card) 22'
DM	12	Evarine Katongo
AM	9	Lubandji Ochumba
AM	7	Misozi Zulu		(substituted off) 58'
CF	11	Siomala Mapepa
CF	6	Mary Wilombe
Substitutions:
FW	21	Avell Chitundu		(substituted on) 58'
Manager:
Bruce Mwape

Formation: 4–1–2–1–2
GK	16	Soulaima Jabrani
RB	14	Ghada Ayadi	(substituted off) 90+3'
CB	6	Rania Aouina
CB	4	Chaima Abbassi
LB	18	Samia Aouni
DM	19	Chirine Lamti
RM	8	Sabrine Mamay
LM	17	Imen Troudi		(substituted off) 81'
AM	7	Ella Kaabachi		(substituted off) 90+3'
CF	10	Meriem Houij
CF	9	Sabrine Ellouzi		(substituted off) 55'
Substitutions:
MF	13	Yasmine Jemai		(substituted on) 55'
FW	20	Leïla Maknoun		(substituted on) 81'
DF	5	Jasmina Barhoumi		(substituted on) 90+3'
MF	21	Soumaya Laamiri		(substituted on) 90+3'
Manager:
Samir Landolsi

=== Togo vs Cameroon ===
6 July 2022
21:00

Togo	1–1	Cameroon
Woedikou 28' (pen.)	Report (FIFA); Report (CAF)	Johnson 38'

Stade Mohammed V, Casablanca
Referee: Zomadre Kore (Ivory Coast)

=== Cameroon vs Tunisia ===
9 July 2022
21:00

Cameroon	2–0	Tunisia
Abam 3'; Nchout 90'	Report (FIFA); Report (CAF)

Stade Mohammed V, Casablanca
Referee: Lidya Tafesse (Ethiopia)

=== Zambia vs Togo ===
9 July 2022
21:00

Zambia	4–1	Togo
Chanda 15', 60'; I. Lungu 21'; Mapepa 41'	Report (FIFA); Report (CAF)	Woedikou 35'

Stade Moulay Hassan, Rabat
Referee: Shamira Nabadda (Uganda)

== Discipline ==
Fair play points will be used as tiebreakers in the group if the overall and head-to-head records of teams were tied, or if teams had the same record in the ranking of third-placed teams. These are calculated based on yellow and red cards received in all group matches as follows:

- first yellow card: plus 1 point;
- indirect red card (second yellow card): plus 3 points;
- direct red card: plus 4 points;
- yellow card and direct red card: plus 5 points;

Team	Match 1				Match 2				Match 3				Points
Team	Booked	(yellow card) (yellow-red card)	Sent off (straight red)	(yellow card) (red card)	Booked	(yellow card) (yellow-red card)	Sent off (straight red)	(yellow card) (red card)	Booked	(yellow card) (yellow-red card)	Sent off (straight red)	(yellow card) (red card)	Points
Cameroon					4				3				–7
Tunisia	1								3				–4
Zambia	1				2				1				–4
Togo	1		1		4				5				–14

== Goalscorers ==
There were 15 goals scored in 6 matches, for an average of 2.5 goals per match.

2 goals

- (Togo) Mafille Woedikou
- (Tunisia) Sabrine Ellouzi
- (Zambia) Grace Chanda

1 goal

- (Cameroon) Michaela Abam
- (Cameroon) Estelle Johnson
- (Cameroon) Ajara Nchout
- (Togo) Odette Gnintegma
- (Tunisia) Mariem Houij
- (Zambia) Avell Chitundu
- (Zambia) Ireen Lungu
- (Zambia) Siomara Mapepa

1 own goal

- (Togo) Amé Amouklou (against Tunisia)
