= Benin women's national football team results =

The Benin women's national football team is the representative women's association football team of Benin . Its governing body is the Benin Football Federation (BFF) and it competes as a member of the Confederation of African Football (CAF).

== Results ==
Legend

Win Draw Lose Fixture

Date	Location	Home team	Score	Away team	Source
17 May 2006	Dakar	Benin	3–2	Guinea	
19 May 2006	Dakar	Senegal	5–1	Benin	
21 May 2006	Dakar	Benin	3–2 (a.e.t.)	Ivory Coast	
29 May 2006	Cotonou	Benin	2–3 (2–2)	Equatorial Guinea	
27 July 2006	Cotonou	Benin	1–2	(Republic of the Congo) Congo	

=== 2006 ===
19 February 2006 African Championship Qualifiers PR	Benin	1–0	Malawi	Cotonou
		Report

26 February 2006 African Championship Qualifiers PR	Malawi	0–0 (0–1 agg.)	Benin	Malawi
		Report

12 March 2006 African Championship Qualifiers R1	Benin	1–1	Ivory Coast	Cotonou
		Report

26 February 2006 African Championship Qualifiers R1	Ivory Coast	1–1 (2–2 agg.) (3–4 p)	Benin	Ivory Coast
		Report		Stadium: [[]]

22 July 2006 African Championship Qualifiers R2	Mali	3–1	Benin	Bamako, Mali
	Doumbia 45'; Diarra 51'; N'Diaye 65'	Report	Bathily 90'	Stadium: Stade Modibo Kéïta

6 August 2006 African Championship Qualifiers R2	Benin	0–1 (1–4 agg.)	Mali	Cotonou
		Report	N'Diaye 48'

=== 2019 ===
17 December Friendly	Burkina Faso	6–2	Benin	Ouagadougou, Burkina Faso
8:00 UTC+1				Stadium: FBF National Technical Center

19 December Friendly	Burkina Faso	4–0	Benin	Ouagadougou, Burkina Faso
8:00 UTC+1				Stadium: FBF National Technical Center

23 December Friendly	Togo	2–1	Benin	Lomé, Togo
	Gnintegma; Koudjoukalo			Stadium: Stade Municipal

26 December Friendly	Togo	1–1	Benin	Lomé, Togo
	Koudjoukalo			Stadium: Stade Municipal

=== 2021 ===
20 October 2022 WAFCON Qualifiers R1	Burkina Faso	2–1	Benin	Abidjan, Ivory Coast
16:00 UTC+0	Millogo 48'; Nikiéma 79'	Report	Fachinan 39'	Stadium: Stade National de la Côte d'Ivoire; Referee: Yemisi Eunice (Nigeria)

24 October 2022 WAFCON Qualifiers R1	Benin	1–3 (2–5 agg.)	Burkina Faso	Cotonou
17:00 UTC+1	Atanhloueto 90'	Report	Tamboura 39'; Sawadogo 50'; Millogo 90+2'	Stadium: Stade de l'Amitié; Referee: Zouwaira Souley Sani (Niger)

=== 2022 ===
14 January Friendly	Togo	0–2	Benin	Lomé, Togo
16:00 UTC+1		Report	Gnammi 39'; Zinsou 44'	Stadium: Stade de Kégué

=== 2023 ===
19 February Friendly	Benin	0–3	Ghana	Cotonou
16:00 UTC+1		Report	Adubea 28'; Owusu 37'; Badu 45+1'	Stadium: Stade de l'Amitié

22 February Friendly	Benin	1–3	Togo	Cotonou
16:00 UTC+1	Ahoubassou 15'	Report	Kayaba 6', 56'; Adindo-Akpo 44'	Stadium: Stade de l'Amitié

9 July Friendly	Benin	1–4	Burkina Faso	Cotonou
16:00 UTC+1	Gnammi 30'	Report	Konaté 12'; Kabré 19'; Tamboura 36'; Sedogo 57'	Stadium: Stade de l'Amitié

14 July 2024 Olympic Qualifiers R1	Guinea-Bissau	2–2	Benin	Bissau, Guinea-Bissau
16:00 UTC+0	Quade 45'; Soares 60'	Report	Gnammi 14'; Gbedjissi 76'	Stadium: Estádio 24 de Setembro

18 July 2024 Olympic Qualifiers R1	Benin	3–2 (5–4 agg.)	Guinea-Bissau	Cotonou
17:00 UTC+1	Fachinan 23'; Gbedjissi 28'; Gnammi 38'	Report	Sissé 2'; Gomes 83'	Stadium: Stade de l'Amitié

22 September 2024 WAFCON Qualifiers R1	DR Congo	2–1	Benin	Kinshasa, DR Congo
15:30 UTC+1	Pambani 14'; Kabakaba 56'	Report	Gnammi 30'	Stadium: Stade des Martyrs

26 September 2024 WAFCON Qualifiers R1	Benin	1–2 (2–4 agg.)	DR Congo	Cotonou
17:00 UTC+1	Gnammi 5'	Report	Kanjinga 31'; Kabakaba 34'	Stadium: Stade de l'Amitié

27 October 2024 Olympic Qualifiers R2	Benin	0–3	Ghana	Cotonou
17:00 UTC+1		Report	Boaduwaa 44' (pen.); Assifuah 73', 78'	Stadium: Stade de l'Amitié

31 October 2024 Olympic Qualifiers R2	Ghana	2–0 (5–0 agg.)	Benin	Accra, Ghana
17:00 UTC+1	Badu 65'; Orou Karo 75' (o.g.)	Report		Stadium: Accra Sports Stadium
