= 2024 CAF Women's Olympic qualifying tournament =

African women's Olympic football qualification tournament

Tournament details
- Dates: First round: 12–18 July 2023; Second round: 25–31 October 2023; Third round: 23–28 February 2024; Fourth Round: 5–9 April 2024
- Teams: 25 (from 1 confederation)

Tournament statistics
- Matches played: 36
- Goals scored: 93 (2.58 per match)
- Top scorer(s): (South Africa) Thembi Kgatlana (5 goals)

The 2024 CAF Women's Olympic qualifying tournament (officially, the Women's Olympic Football Tournament Qualifiers) was the sixth edition of the CAF Women's Olympic Qualifying Tournament, the quadrennial international football competition organised by the Confederation of African Football (CAF) to determine which women's national teams from Africa qualify for the Olympic football tournament.

On 24 February 2022, FIFA awarded CAF two slots for the 2024 Summer Olympic Games in France.

== Entrants ==
Fifty-three CAF members were eligible to enter qualifying, with Zimbabwe having been suspended since 24 February 2022, though only 25 submitted entries. The draw took place on 30 May 2023 in Cairo, Egypt. Seven teams were awarded a bye to the second round of qualifying based upon their results in the 2022 Women's Africa Cup of Nations.

| Second round entrants (7 teams) | First round entrants (18 teams) |
|---|---|
| 1. South Africa (54); 2. Morocco (73); 3. Zambia (77); 4. Nigeria (42); 5. Cameroon (56); 6. Tunisia (76); 7. Botswana (150) | 8. Ghana (59); 9. Ivory Coast (64); 10. Equatorial Guinea (71); 11. Mali (81); 12. Congo (111); 13. DR Congo (112); 14. Burkina Faso (141); 15. Benin (146); 16. Ethiopia (125); 17. Guinea (136); 18. Sierra Leone (138); 19. Namibia (147); 20. Tanzania (152); 21. Uganda (160); 22. Rwanda (163); 23. Guinea-Bissau (172); 24. Mozambique (173); 25. Chad (unranked) |

Notes

- Teams in **bold** qualified for the Olympics.
- Numbers in parentheses indicate world ranking at the time of the draw.

Did not enter

- Algeria
- Angola
- Burundi
- Cape Verde
- Central African Republic
- Comoros
- Djibouti
- Egypt
- Eritrea
- Eswatini
- Gabon
- Gambia
- Kenya
- Lesotho
- Liberia
- Libya
- Madagascar
- Malawi
- Mauritania
- Mauritius
- Niger
- São Tomé and Príncipe
- Senegal
- Seychelles
- Somalia
- South Sudan
- Sudan
- Togo
- Zimbabwe (suspended)

== Draw ==
The teams drawn into round 1 were divided into 4 pots based upon geographical considerations, with teams from pot 1 being drawn against teams from pot 2 and teams from pot 3 being drawn against teams from pot 4; an empty pot was used to randomize which team played at home first. One team each from pots 1 and 2 were drawn and placed into pot 5, where the first team drawn was designated to play the first leg at home and the second team drawn was designated to play the second leg at home. This process was repeated until pots 1 and 2 were empty, then the same process occurred with pots 3 and 4.

| Pot 1 (WAFU A) | Pot 2 (WAFU B) | Pot 3 (UNIFFAC) | Pot 4 (COSAFA & CECAFA) |
|---|---|---|---|
| Mali; Sierra Leone; Guinea; Guinea-Bissau | Benin; Burkina Faso; Ivory Coast; Ghana | Chad; Congo; DR Congo; Equatorial Guinea; Rwanda | Mozambique; Namibia; Uganda; Tanzania; Ethiopia |

== Format ==
Four rounds of home-and-away matches determined the two CAF representatives to the 2024 Summer Olympics in France. If the aggregate scores were tied at the end of the second leg, then 30 minutes of extra time were played. If the score was still level after extra time, then kicks from the penalty spot were used to determine the winner. The matches were played in the FIFA match windows in July and October 2023 and in February and April 2024.

Match schedule
| Round | Dates |
|---|---|
| First round | 10–18 July 2023 |
| Second round | 23–31 October 2023 |
| Third round | 23–28 February 2024 |
| Fourth round | 5–9 April 2024 |

== Bracket ==
The match bracket was as follows:

First round
10–18 July 2023
Guinea-Bissau | 2 | 2 | 4
Benin | 2 | 3 | 5
10–18 July 2023
Guinea | 0 | 0 | 0
Ghana | 3 | 4 | 7
10–18 July 2023
Burkina Faso | 0 | 2 | 2
Mali (a.e.t.) | 1 | 2 | 3
10–18 July 2023
Ivory Coast | — | — | w/o
Sierra Leone | — | —
10–18 July 2023
Namibia | 2 | 0 | 2
Equatorial Guinea | 0 | 0 | 0
10–18 July 2023
Uganda (a.e.t.) | 3 | 1 | 4
Rwanda | 3 | 0 | 3
10–18 July 2023
Ethiopia | 6 | 4 | 10
Chad | 0 | 0 | 0
10–18 July 2023
Congo | — | —
Tanzania | — | — | w/o
10–18 July 2023
Mozambique | — | —
DR Congo | — | — | w/o

Second round
23–31 October 2023
Benin | 0 | 0 | 0
Ghana | 3 | 2 | 5
23–31 October 2023
Mali | — | —
Zambia | — | — | w/o
23–31 October 2023
Ivory Coast | — | —
Tunisia | — | — | w/o
23–31 October 2023
Namibia | 0 | 0 | 0
Morocco | 2 | 2 | 4
23–31 October 2023
Uganda | 2 | 0 | 2
Cameroon (a.e.t.) | 0 | 3 | 3
23–31 October 2023
Ethiopia | 1 | 0 | 1
Nigeria | 1 | 4 | 5
23–31 October 2023
Tanzania | 2 | 1 | 3
Botswana | 0 | 0 | 0
23–31 October 2023
DR Congo | 1 | 0 | 1
South Africa | 1 | 2 | 3

Third round
19–28 February 2024
Ghana | 0 | 3 | 3
Zambia | 1 | 3 | 4
19–28 February 2024
Tunisia | 1 | 1 | 2
Morocco | 2 | 4 | 6
19–28 February 2024
Cameroon | 0 | 0 | 0
Nigeria | 0 | 1 | 1
19–28 February 2024
Tanzania | 0 | 0 | 0
South Africa | 3 | 1 | 4

Fourth round
5–9 April 2024
Zambia (a.e.t.) | 1 | 2 | 3
Morocco | 2 | 0 | 2
5–9 April 2024
Nigeria | 1 | 0 | 1
South Africa | 0 | 0 | 0

== First round ==
2024 CAF Women's Olympic qualifying tournament first round
| Team 1 | Agg. | Team 2 | 1st leg | 2nd leg |
|---|---|---|---|---|
| Guinea-Bissau | 4–5 | Benin | 2–2 | 2–3 |
| Guinea | 0–7 | Ghana | 0–3 | 0–4 |
| Burkina Faso | 2–3 | Mali | 0–1 | 2–2 (a.e.t.) |
| Ivory Coast | w/o | Sierra Leone | — | — |
| Namibia | 2–0 | Equatorial Guinea | 2–0 | 0–0 |
| Uganda | 4–3 | Rwanda | 3–3 | 1–0 (a.e.t.) |
| Ethiopia | 10–0 | Chad | 6–0 | 4–0 |
| Congo | w/o | Tanzania | — | — |
| Mozambique | w/o | DR Congo | — | — |

14 July 2023
16:00 UTC+0

| Guinea-Bissau | 2–2 | Benin |
|---|---|---|
| Quade 45'; Iala 60' | Report | Gnammi 14'; Gbedjissi 76' |

Estádio 24 de Setembro, Bissau
18 July 2023
17:00 UTC+1

| Benin | 3–2 | Guinea-Bissau |
|---|---|---|
| Fachina 23'; Gbedjissi 28'; Gnammi 38' | Report | Sissé 2'; Gomes 83' |

Stade de l'Amitié, Cotonou

Benin won 5–4 on aggregate.

14 July 2023
16:00 UTC+0

| Guinea | 0–3 | Ghana |
|---|---|---|
| | Report | Adjei 19'; Adubea 27'; Badu 72' |

General Lansana Conté Stadium, Conakry
18 July 2023
16:00 UTC+0

| Ghana | 4–0 | Guinea |
|---|---|---|
| Badu 36', 59'; Adubea 53'; Yakubu 86' | Report |

Accra Sports Stadium, Accra

Ghana won 7–0 on aggregate.

12 July 2023
14:30 UTC+1

| Burkina Faso | 0–1 | Mali |
|---|---|---|
| | Report | A. Diarra 11' |

Stade de l'Amitié, Cotonou (Benin)
18 July 2023
16:30 UTC+0

| Mali | 2–2 (a.e.t.) | Burkina Faso |
|---|---|---|
| Traoré 29'; Sogoré 100' | Report | Sawadogo 11', 52' |

Stade du 26 Mars, Bamako

Mali won 3–2 on aggregate.

12 July 2023

| Ivory Coast | Cancelled | Sierra Leone |

15 July 2023

| Sierra Leone | Cancelled | Ivory Coast |

Ivory Coast won on walkover after Sierra Leone withdrew.

13 July 2023
15:00 UTC+2

| Namibia | 2–0 | Equatorial Guinea |
|---|---|---|
| Coleman 34'; Kooper 55' | Report |

FNB Stadium, Nasrec (South Africa)
Referee: Gloria Sambumba (Zambia)
18 July 2023
16:00 UTC+1

| Equatorial Guinea | 0–0 | Namibia |
|---|---|---|
| | Report |

Estadio de Malabo, Malabo

Namibia won 2–0 on aggregate.

12 July 2023
16:00 UTC+2

| Uganda | 3–3 | Rwanda |
|---|---|---|
| Nyanagahirwa 45+2'; Nassuna 54' (pen.); Ikwaput 84' | Report | Mukhirwa 33'; Nibagwire 66'; Usanase 86' |

Kigali Pelé Stadium, Kigali (Rwanda)
16 July 2023
15:00 UTC+2

| Rwanda | 0–1 (a.e.t.) | Uganda |
|---|---|---|
| | Report | Ikwaput 103' |

Kigali Pelé Stadium, Kigali

Uganda won 4–3 on aggregate.

13 July 2023
15:30 UTC+3

| Ethiopia | 6–0 | Chad |
|---|---|---|
| Temesgen 13'; Kalsa 24', 63'; Getnet 26'; Abera 79'; Yein 82' | Report |

Abebe Bikila Stadium, Addis Ababa
16 July 2023
15:30 UTC+3

| Chad | 0–4 | Ethiopia |
|---|---|---|
| | Report | Abera 11'; Wakuma 19', 45'; Lemma 89' |

Abebe Bikila Stadium, Addis Ababa

Ethiopia won 10–0 on aggregate.

10 July 2023

| Congo | Cancelled | Tanzania |

Stade Alphonse Massemba-Débat, Brazzaville
18 July 2023

| Tanzania | Cancelled | Congo |

National Stadium, Dar es Salaam

Tanzania won on walkover after Congo withdrew.

10 July 2023

| Mozambique | Cancelled | DR Congo |

17 July 2023

| DR Congo | Cancelled | Mozambique |

DR Congo won on walkover after Mozambique withdrew.

== Second round ==
2024 CAF Women's Olympic qualifying tournament second round
| Team 1 | Agg. | Team 2 | 1st leg | 2nd leg |
|---|---|---|---|---|
| Benin | 0–5 | Ghana | 0–3 | 0–2 |
| Mali | w/o | Zambia | — | — |
| Ivory Coast | w/o | Tunisia | — | — |
| Namibia | 0–4 | Morocco | 0–2 | 0–2 |
| Uganda | 2–3 | Cameroon | 2–0 | 0–3 (a.e.t.) |
| Ethiopia | 1–5 | Nigeria | 1–1 | 0–4 |
| Tanzania | 3–0 | Botswana | 2–0 | 1–0 |
| DR Congo | 1–3 | South Africa | 1–1 | 0–2 |

27 October 2023
17:00 UTC+1

| Benin | 0–3 | Ghana |
|---|---|---|
| | Report | Boaduwaa 44' (pen.); Assifuah 73', 78' |

Stade de l'Amitié, Cotonou
31 October 2023
15:30 UTC+0

| Ghana | 2–0 | Benin |
|---|---|---|
| Badu 65'; Orou Karo 75' (o.g.) | Report |

Accra Sports Stadium, Accra

Ghana won 5–0 on aggregate.

October 2023

| Mali | Cancelled | Zambia |

October 2023

| Zambia | Cancelled | Mali |

Zambia won on walkover after Mali withdrew.

October 2023

| Ivory Coast | Cancelled | Tunisia |

October 2023

| Tunisia | Cancelled | Ivory Coast |

Tunisia won on walkover after Ivory Coast withdrew.

26 October 2023
20:00 UTC+2

| Namibia | 0–2 | Morocco |
|---|---|---|
| | Report | El Chad 20'; Lahmari 78' |

Stade de Marrakech, Marrakesh (Morocco)
31 October 2023
19:00 UTC+1

| Morocco | 2–0 | Namibia |
|---|---|---|
| Saoud 76'; Chebbak 89' (pen.) | Report |

Moulay Hassan Stadium, Rabat

Morocco won 4–0 on aggregate.

26 October 2023
16:00 UTC+3

| Uganda | 2–0 | Cameroon |
|---|---|---|
| Nagadya 12'; Ikwaput 75' | Report |

FUFA Technical Centre, Njeru
31 October 2023
17:00 UTC+1

| Cameroon | 3–0 (a.e.t.) | Uganda |
|---|---|---|
| Njoya 27'; Ngock 47'; Omboudou 115' | Report |

Stade de la Réunification, Douala

Cameroon won 3–2 on aggregate.

25 October 2023
15:30 UTC+3

| Ethiopia | 1–1 | Nigeria |
|---|---|---|
| Amare 6' | Report | Ajibade 52' |

Abebe Bikila Stadium, Addis Ababa
31 October 2023
16:00 UTC+1

| Nigeria | 4–0 | Ethiopia |
|---|---|---|
| Kanu 45+1'; Ajibade 50', 72'; Oshoala 68' | Report |

MKO Abiola Stadium, Abeokuta

Nigeria won 5–1 on aggregate.

26 October 2023
16:00 UTC+3

| Tanzania | 2–0 | Botswana |
|---|---|---|
| Clement 2' (pen.); Masaka 89' | Report |

Azam Complex Stadium, Dar es Salaam
31 October 2023
18:00 UTC+2

| Botswana | 0–1 | Tanzania |
|---|---|---|
| | Report | Masaka 26' |

Botswana National Stadium, Gaborone

Tanzania won 3–0 on aggregate.

25 October 2023
15:30 UTC+1

| DR Congo | 1–1 | South Africa |
|---|---|---|
| Mfwamba 40' | Report | Kgatlana 48' |

Stade des Martyrs, Kinshasa
30 October 2023
16:00 UTC+2

| South Africa | 2–0 | DR Congo |
|---|---|---|
| Kgatlana 71', 88' | Report |

Orlando Stadium, Johannesburg

South Africa won 3–1 on aggregate.

== Third round ==
2024 CAF Women's Olympic qualifying tournament third round
| Team 1 | Agg. | Team 2 | 1st leg | 2nd leg |
|---|---|---|---|---|
| Ghana | 3–4 | Zambia | 0–1 | 3–3 |
| Tunisia | 2–6 | Morocco | 1–2 | 1–4 |
| Cameroon | 0–1 | Nigeria | 0–0 | 0–1 |
| Tanzania | 0–4 | South Africa | 0–3 | 0–1 |

23 February 2024
17:00 UTC+0

| Ghana | 0–1 | Zambia |
|---|---|---|
| | Report | Kundananji 18' |

Accra Sports Stadium, Accra
28 February 2024
18:00 UTC+2

| Zambia | 3–3 | Ghana |
|---|---|---|
| B. Banda 10', 90+6'; Assifuah 61' (o.g.) | Report | Assifuah 22'; Boaduwaa 55'; Bugre 64' |

Levy Mwanawasa Stadium, Ndola

Zambia won 4–3 on aggregate.

23 February 2024
14:30 UTC+1

| Tunisia | 1–2 | Morocco |
|---|---|---|
| Kaabachi 51' | Report | Tagnaout 43'; Chebbak 54' |

Stade municipal de Soliman, Soliman
28 February 2024
19:00 UTC+1

| Morocco | 4–1 | Tunisia |
|---|---|---|
| Tagnaout 11'; Jraïdi 16', 20', 22' | Report | Zemzem 58' |

Moulay Hassan Stadium, Rabat

Morocco won 6–2 on aggregate.

23 February 2024
18:00 UTC+1

| Cameroon | 0–0 | Nigeria |
|---|---|---|
| | Report |

Stade de la Réunification, Douala
26 February 2024
16:00 UTC+1

| Nigeria | 1–0 | Cameroon |
|---|---|---|
| Okoronkwo 15' | Report |

Moshood Abiola National Stadium, Abuja

Nigeria won 1–0 on aggregate.

23 February 2024
16:00 UTC+3

| Tanzania | 0–3 | South Africa |
|---|---|---|
| | Report | Seoposenwe 10'; Kgatlana 58'; Magaia 86' |

Azam Complex Stadium, Dar es Salaam
27 February 2024
19:30 UTC+2

| South Africa | 1–0 | Tanzania |
|---|---|---|
| Kgatlana 58' | Report |

Mbombela Stadium, Mbombela

South Africa won 4–0 on aggregate.

== Fourth round ==
The winners of the fourth round ties qualified for the 2024 Summer Olympics in France.

2024 CAF Women's Olympic qualifying tournament fourth round
| Team 1 | Agg. | Team 2 | 1st leg | 2nd leg |
|---|---|---|---|---|
| Zambia | 3–2 | Morocco | 1–2 | 2–0 (a.e.t.) |
| Nigeria | 1–0 | South Africa | 1–0 | 0–0 |

5 April 2024
17:00 UTC+0

| Zambia | 1–2 | Morocco |
|---|---|---|
| Mweemba 80' | Report | Redouani 45'; Ayane 90+4' |

Levy Mwanawasa Stadium, Ndola
Referee: Aline Guimbang Etong (Cameroon)
9 April 2024
22:00 UTC+0

| Morocco | 0–2 (a.e.t.) | Zambia |
|---|---|---|
| | Report | B. Banda 39', 105+2' (pen.) |

Moulay Hassan Stadium, Rabat
Referee: Salima Mukansanga (Rwanda)

Zambia won 3–2 on aggregate.

5 April 2024
17:00 UTC+1

| Nigeria | 1–0 | South Africa |
|---|---|---|
| Ajibade 43' (pen.) | Report |

MKO Abiola Stadium, Abeokuta
Referee: Ghada Mehat (Algeria)
9 April 2024
19:30 UTC+2

| South Africa | 0–0 | Nigeria |
|---|---|---|
| | Report |

Loftus Versfeld Stadium, Pretoria
Referee: Dorsaf Ganouati (Tunisia)

Nigeria won 1–0 on aggregate.

== Qualified teams for the 2024 Summer Olympics ==
The following two teams from CAF qualified for the 2024 Summer Olympic women's football tournament in France.

| Team | Qualified on | Previous appearances in Summer Olympics |
|---|---|---|
| Nigeria | 9 April 2024 | 3 (2000, 2004, 2008) |
| Zambia | 10 April 2024 | 1 (2020) |

== Goalscorers ==
There were 93 goals scored in 36 matches, for an average of 2.58 goals per match.

5 goals

- (South Africa) Thembi Kgatlana

4 goals

- (Ghana) Evelyn Badu
- (Nigeria) Rasheedat Ajibade
- (Zambia) Barbra Banda

3 goals

- (Ghana) Gifty Assifuah
- (Morocco) Ibtissam Jraïdi
- (Uganda) Fazila Ikwaput

2 goals

- (Benin) Aude Gbedjissi
- (Benin) Yolande Gnammi
- (Burkina Faso) Balkissa Sawadogo
- (Ethiopia) Loza Abera
- (Ethiopia) Aregesh Kalsa
- (Ethiopia) Senaf Wakuma
- (Ghana) Princella Adubea
- (Ghana) Doris Boaduwaa
- (Morocco) Ghizlane Chebbak
- (Morocco) Fatima Tagnaout
- (Tanzania) Aisha Masaka

1 goal

- (Benin) Léa Fachina
- (Cameroon) Monique Ngock
- (Cameroon) Ajara Nchout Njoya
- (Cameroon) Brigitte Omboudou
- (Democratic Republic of the Congo) Grâce Mfwamba
- (Ethiopia) Birkie Amare
- (Ethiopia) Nardos Getnet
- (Ethiopia) Turist Lemma
- (Ethiopia) Mesay Temesgen
- (Ethiopia) Nayboney Yein
- (Ghana) Vivian Adjei
- (Ghana) Azumah Bugre
- (Ghana) Firdous Yakubu
- (Guinea-Bissau) Itcha Cesário Gomes
- (Guinea-Bissau) Nadi Quade
- (Guinea-Bissau) Fatumata Silla Sissé
- (Guinea-Bissau) Julieta Soares
- (Mali) Agueissa Diarra
- (Mali) Coulouba Sogoré
- (Mali) Aïssata Traoré
- (Morocco) Rosella Ayane
- (Morocco) Nesryne El Chad
- (Morocco) Anissa Lahmari
- (Morocco) Zineb Redouani
- (Morocco) Imane Saoud
- (Namibia) Zenatha Coleman
- (Namibia) Ivone Kooper
- (Nigeria) Uchenna Kanu
- (Nigeria) Esther Okoronkwo
- (Nigeria) Asisat Oshoala
- (Rwanda) Providence Mukahirwa
- (Rwanda) Libelle Nibagwire
- (Rwanda) Zawadi Usanase
- (South Africa) Jermaine Seoposenwe
- (South Africa) Hildah Magaia
- (Tanzania) Opah Clement
- (Tunisia) Ella Kaabachi
- (Tunisia) Salma Zemzem
- (Uganda) Catherine Nagadya
- (Uganda) Hasifah Nassuna
- (Uganda) Shakira Nyanagahirwa
- (Zambia) Racheal Kundananji
- (Zambia) Lushomo Mweemba

1 own goal

- (Benin) Kadidjath Orou Karo (against Ghana)
- (Ghana) Gifty Assifuah (against Zambia)

== External websites ==
CAF Women's Football
