= Chebli (surname) =

Chebli (Arabic: الشبلي) is a surname of Arabic origin. Notable people with the surname are as follows:

- Kamel Chebli (born 1954), Tunisian football player
- Samuel Chebli (born 1971), Liberian football player and manager
- Sana Chebli, Tunisian football player
- Sawsan Chebli (born 1978), Palestinian origin German politician
