= Chaima Abbassi =

Tunisian footballer (born 1993)

Personal information
- Full name: Chaima Abbassi
- Date of birth: 4 June 1993 (age 33)
- Place of birth: Tunisia
- Position: Defender

Team information
- Current team: NEOM
- Number: 4

Senior career*
Years	Team	Apps	(Gls)
–2022	AS Banque de l'Habitat		
2022–2023	Al Yamamah	14	(1)
2023–2024	Al-Shabab	16	(1)
2024–	NEOM	2	(0)

International career^{‡}
2009–2010	Tunisia U17		
2013–	Tunisia	35	(0)
- * Club domestic league appearances and goals as of 29 March 2023 ‡ National team caps and goals as of 28 February 2024

Chaima Abbassi (Arabic: شيماء العباسي; born 4 June 1993) is a professional Tunisian footballer who plays as a defender for Saudi Women's Premier League club NEOM and the Tunisia national team.

She is also known as Chaima Abdulaziz Al Abbassi in Saudi Arabia where the patronymic name is commonly used.

== Club career ==
=== Al Yamamah ===
In October 2022, after the establishment of the Saudi Women's Premier League, Abbassi joined Al Yamamah ahead of the 2022–23. On 14 October 2022, she started in Al Yamamah 3–1 win over Eastern Flames. On 16 December 2022, she scored her first goal for the club in a 6–0 win over Eastern Flames, netting the goal in the 12th minute.

=== Al-Shabab ===
In August 2023, Al-Shabab announced Abbassi's signing without specifying the duration of the contract. On 24 August 2023, She made her debut for the club in a 3–4 loss to the Orthodox Club in the 2023 Jordanian-Saudi Women's Clubs Championship. she made her Premier League debut on 14 October 2023, in a 1–0 win over Al-Shabab. She scored her first goal for the club in the 2023–24 SAFF Women's Cup final against Al-Ahli scoring in the 89th minute in a 2–3 loss.

== International career ==
Abbassi has represented Tunisia at the senior level and has been the team's captain since 2021, leading them in over 25 consecutive matches. This makes her the longest-serving captain of any national team in Tunisia.

== Honours ==
Tunisia

- Arab Women's Cup Runner-up (silver) : 2021
- UNAF Women's Tournament Third place (bronze) : 2020

AS Banque de l'Habitat

- Tunisian Women's Championship Winner: 2010
- Tunisian Women's Cup Winner: 2010

== See also ==
- List of Tunisia women's international footballers
