= Rahma Ghars =

Tunisian footballer (born 1994)

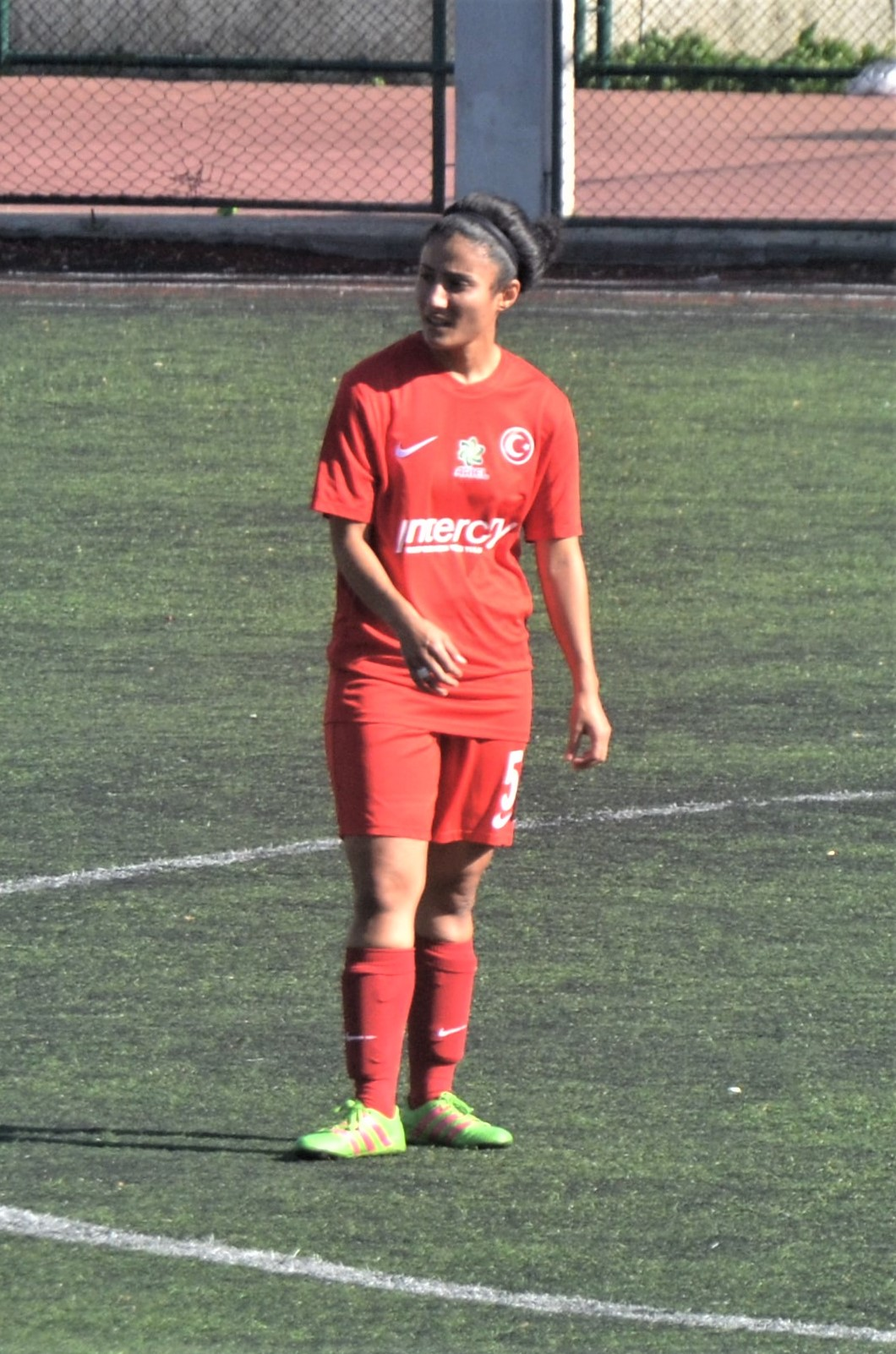
- Rahma Ghars for Ataşehir Belediyespor (November 2018)

Personal information
- Date of birth: 4 November 1994 (age 31)
- Place of birth: Tunisia
- Position: Defender

Team information
- Current team: Saham

Senior career*
| Years | Team | Apps | (Gls) |
| 2018 | Ataşehir Belediyespor | 6 | (1) |
| 2022– | Saham | | |

International career
- Tunisia
- * Club domestic league appearances and goals as of 23 December 2018

Rahma Ghars (Arabic: رحمة غارس; born 4 November 1994) is a Tunisian women's football defender. She plays for Saudi club Saham. She was a member of the Tunisia national team.

== Private life ==
Rahma Ghars was born in Tunisia on 4 November 1994.

== Playing career ==
=== Club ===
Ghars moved to Turkey and joined the Istanbul-based team Ataşehir Belediyespor on 24 October 2018. She appeared in six matches of the first half of the 2018–19 Turkish Women's First Football League season.

=== International ===
Ghars was a member of the Tunisia women's national football team at the 2016 Africa Women Cup of Nations qualification matches.

== Career statistics ==
As of match played 23 December 2018.

| Club | Season | League | | | Continental | | National | | Total | |
| Club | Season | Division | Apps | Goals | Apps | Goals | Apps | Goals | Apps | Goals |
|---|---|---|---|---|---|---|---|---|---|---|
| Ataşehir Belediyespor | 2018–19 | First League | 6 | 1 | – | – | | | 6 | 1 |
| Ataşehir Belediyespor | Total | | 6 | 1 | – | – | | | 6 | 1 |

== See also ==
- List of Tunisia women's international footballers
