= Anissa Dellidj =

French–Algerian footballer (born 1993)

Personal information
- Date of birth: 6 April 1993 (age 33)
- Place of birth: Seclin, France
- Position: Forward

Team information
- Current team: Bousbecque

Senior career*
Years	Team	Apps	(Gls)
2008–2015	Templemars	70	(14)
2015–2019	Lille	15	(0)
2019–2020	Grand Calais		
2020–	Bousbecque		

International career^{‡}
2020	Algeria	1+	(1+)
- * Club domestic league appearances and goals as of 17 November 2018 ‡ National team caps and goals as of 16 February 2020

Anissa Dellidj (Arabic: أنيسة دليج; born 6 April 1993) is a footballer who plays as a forward. Born in France, she represents Algeria at international level.

== Club career ==
Dellidj has played for Templemars Vendeville, Lille OSC, Grand Calais Pascal FC and FC Bousbecque Féminine in France.

== International career ==
Dellidj was capped for Algeria at senior level during the 2020 UNAF Women's Tournament.

=== International goals ===
Scores and results list Algeria goal tally first

No.	Date	Venue	Opponent	Score	Result	Competition	Ref.
1	16 February 2020	El Kram Stadium, El Kram, Tunisia	Tanzania	1–1	2–3	2020 UNAF Women's Tournament	
