= Soumaya Ouerghi =

Tunisian football player and manager

Soumaya Ourghui
Personal information
- Position: Goalkeeper

Senior career*
Years	Team	Apps	(Gls)
- ISSEP Kef

International career^{‡}
2008–2009	Tunisia	3+	(0+)

Managerial career
- Tunisia Women (goalkeeping coach)
- * Club domestic league appearances and goals ‡ National team caps and goals as of 25 June 2009.

Soumaya Ourghui (Arabic: سمية ورقي) is a Tunisian football former player and current manager. She played as a goalkeeper and has represented the Tunisia women's national team, of which she is now the goalkeeping coach.

== Club career ==
Ourghui has played for ISSEP Kef in Tunisia.

== International career ==
Ourghui capped for Tunisia at senior level during the 2008 African Women's Championship.

== See also ==
- List of Tunisia women's international footballers
