= Chaima Khammar =

German–Tunisian footballer

Personal information
- Date of birth: 14 September 1999 (age 27)
- Place of birth: Germany
- Height: 1.65 m (5 ft 5 in)
- Position: Midfielder

College career
Years	Team	Apps	(Gls)
2018–2022	UMass Lowell River Hawks	37	(1)
2023	Hawaii Rainbow Wahine	8	(0)

Senior career*
Years	Team	Apps	(Gls)
2016–2018	1. FC Köln (women)	13	(1)
2018	1. FC Köln II	5	(0)

International career^{‡}
2014	Germany U15	1	(0)
2021–	Tunisia	1	(0)
- * Club domestic league appearances and goals as of 15 April 2021 ‡ National team caps and goals as of 13 June 2021

Chaima Khammar (Arabic: شيماء خمّار; born 14 September 1999) is a footballer who plays as a midfielder for American collegiate team UMass Lowell River Hawks. Born in Germany, she has made one appearance for the Tunisia women's national team.

== Early life ==
Khammar was raised in Cologne.

== College career ==
Khammar has attended the University of Massachusetts Lowell in the United States.

== Club career ==
Khammar has played for 1. FC Köln in Germany.

== International career ==
Khammar has capped for Tunisia at senior level, including in a 2–0 friendly away win over Jordan on 13 June 2021.

== See also ==
- List of Tunisia women's international footballers
