= 2020 UNAF Women's Tournament =

Tournament details
- Country: Tunisia
- Dates: 13 – 23 February
- Teams: 5

Final positions
- Champions: Morocco (1st title)
- Runners-up: Tanzania
- Third place: Tunisia

Tournament statistics
- Matches played: 10
- Goals scored: 37 (3.7 per match)
- Top goal scorer(s): (Tanzania) Mwanahamisi Shurua (5 goals)

The 2020 UNAF Women's Tournament is the 2nd edition of the UNAF Women's Tournament, an association football tournament open to the women's national teams of UNAF member countries. The tournament took place in Tunisia. Of the five UNAF member countries, Libya and Egypt chose not to participate in the competition. Mauritania and Tanzania were invited to replace the two withdrawal teams.

== Participants ==
- Algeria
- Morocco
- Tunisia (hosts)
- Egypt (withdrew)
- Libya (withdrew)
- Mauritania (invited)
- Tanzania (invited)

== Venues ==
Le Kram	2020 UNAF Women's Tournament is located in Tunisia
El Kram Stadium	2020 UNAF Women's Tournament is located in Tunisia
Capacity: 5,000	2020 UNAF Women's Tournament is located in Tunisia

== Tournament ==
All times are local, CAT (UTC+1).

=== Matches ===
14 February 2020
11:00

Tanzania	7–0	Mauritania
Amina Bellali 8'; Opa Clement 13'; Fatouma Saloum 23'; Onikia Kasunga 28'; Shurua 29', 38'; Kadushu Shabami 45'	Report

El Kram Stadium, El Kram
14 February 2020
13:00

Tunisia	0–1	Morocco
	Report	Mssoudy 63'

El Kram Stadium, El Kram

16 February 2020
11:00

Algeria	2–3	Tanzania
Dellidj 22'; Affak 45'	Report	Shurua 11', 45+2'; Diana Lucas Misua 90+3'

El Kram Stadium, El Kram
16 February 2020
13:00

Tunisia	3–0	Mauritania
Laamiri 33'; Mchara 48' (pen.); Ben Mohamed 81'	Report

El Kram Stadium, El Kram

18 February 2020
11:00

Mauritania	0–5	Algeria
	Report	Boubezari 30'; Daoui 45'; Hadjar 52'; Soulef Kacem 57'; Merrouche 70'

El Kram Stadium, El Kram
18 February 2020
13:00

Tanzania	2–3	Morocco
Shurua 1'; Jolita Singanu 75'	Report	Addi 8' (pen.); Amani 44'; Mssoudy 68'

El Kram Stadium, El Kram

20 February 2020
11:00

Morocco	5–0	Mauritania
Amani 12'; Chebbak 20' (pen.), 38', 40'; Khirou 49'	Report

El Kram Stadium, El Kram
20 February 2020
13:00

Tunisia	1–1	Algeria
Jemai 11'	Report	Merrouche 21' (pen.)

El Kram Stadium, El Kram

22 February 2020
11:00

Algeria	0–2	Morocco
	Report	Chebbak 50'; Jraidi 86'

El Kram Stadium, El Kram
22 February 2020
13:00

Tunisia	1–1	Tanzania
Houij 5'	Report	Masaka 68'

El Kram Stadium, El Kram

=== Final ranking ===
R	Team	P	W	D	L	GF	GA	GD	Pts.
1	Morocco	4	4	0	0	11	2	+9	12
2	Tanzania	4	2	1	1	13	6	+7	7
3	Tunisia	4	1	2	1	5	3	+2	5
4	Algeria	4	1	1	2	8	6	+2	4
5	Mauritania	4	0	0	4	0	20	−20	0

== Goalscorers ==
5 goals

- (Tanzania) Mwanahamisi Shurua

4 goals

- (Morocco) Ghizlane Chebbak

2 goals

- (Algeria) Imene Merrouche
- (Morocco) Salma Amani
- (Morocco) Sanaâ Mssoudy

1 goal

- (Algeria) Houria Affak
- (Algeria) Hanna Boubezari
- (Algeria) Ferial Daoui
- (Algeria) Anissa Dellidj
- (Algeria) Kenza Hadjar
- (Algeria) Soulef Kacem
- (Morocco) Nour Imane Addi
- (Morocco) Ibtissam Jraidi
- (Morocco) Hayat Khirou
- (Tanzania) Amina Bellali
- (Tanzania) Opa Clement
- (Tanzania) Onikia Kasunga
- (Tanzania) Diana Lucas Misua
- (Tanzania) Aisha Masaka
- (Tanzania) Fatouma Saloum
- (Tanzania) Kadushu Shabami
- (Tanzania) Jolita Singanu
- (Tunisia) Chaima Ben Mohamed
- (Tunisia) Mariem Houij
- (Tunisia) Yasmine Jemai
- (Tunisia) Soumaya Laamiri
- (Tunisia) Imen Mchara
