= Gifty Assifuah =

Ghanaian footballer (born 2000)

Personal information
- Date of birth: 23 July 2000 (age 26)
- Place of birth: Accra, Ghana
- Position: Forward

Team information
- Current team: 1207 Antalya Spor
- Number: 11

Senior career*
Years	Team	Apps	(Gls)
2018–2019	Sekondi Hasaacas		
2019–2020	Halifax Ladies		
2020–2021	Hasaacas Ladies		
2021–	1207 Antalya Spor	33	(19)
- * Club domestic league appearances and goals

Gifty Assifuah (born 23 July 2000) is a Ghanaian professional footballer, who plays as a forward for 1207 Antalya Spor in the Turkish Women's Football Super League.

== Personal life ==
Assifuah was born in Accra, Ghana. Her birth date was officially changed from 23 July 1998 to the same day in 2000 with effect from 5 July 2017.

== Career ==
Assifuah was inspired by her brother Ebenezer, a successful national footballer. She admits that she learned and picked up tricks from him.

Being a forward, she played for Sekondi Hasaacas (2018–2019), Halifax Ladies (2019–2020) and Hasaacas Ladies (2020–2021) in her country.

In 2021, she moved to Turkey and joined 1207 Antalya Spor to play in the Turkish Women's Football Super League She scored her team's only goal in the additional time, her team's first goal in the 2021-22 league season's first and winning match.

== Career statistics ==
No.	Date	Venue	Opponent	Score	Result	Competition
1.	8 April 2023	Accra Sports Stadium, Accra, Ghana	Senegal	1–0	3–0	Friendly
2.	8 April 2023	Accra Sports Stadium, Accra, Ghana	Senegal	3–0	3–0	Friendly
3.	27 October 2023	Stade de l'Amitié, Cotonou, Benin	Benin	2–0	3–0	2024 CAF Women's Olympic qualifying tournament
4.	27 October 2023	Stade de l'Amitié, Cotonou, Benin	Benin	3–0	3–0	2024 CAF Women's Olympic qualifying tournament
5.	28 February 2024	Levy Mwanawasa Stadium, Ndola, Zambia	Zambia	1–1	3–3	2024 CAF Women's Olympic qualifying tournament
