= Salma Amani =

Moroccan footballer (born 1989)

Salma Amani سلمى أماني
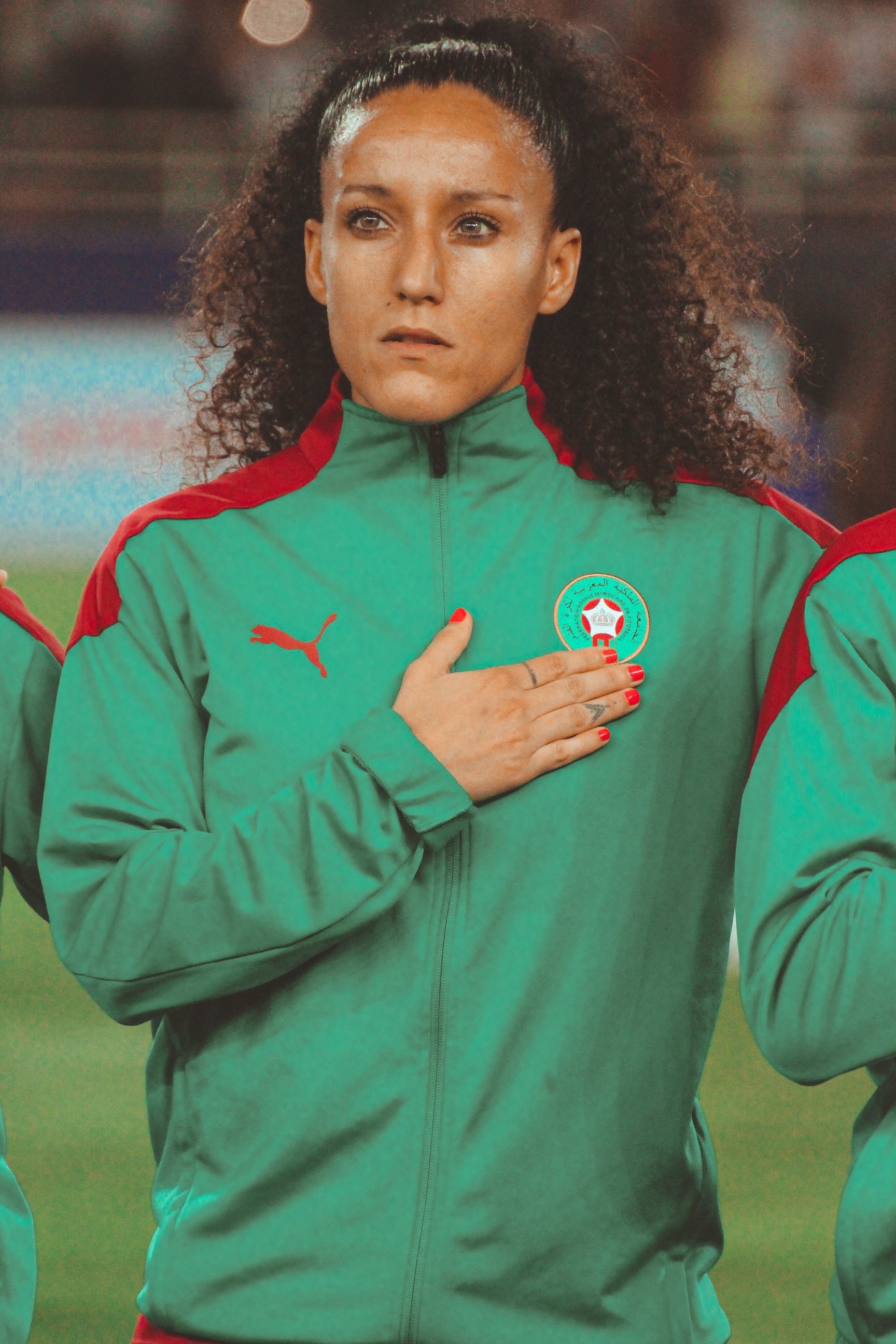
- Amani with Morocco in 2022

Personal information
- Full name: Salma Abdulkarim Lahcen Amani
- Date of birth: 28 November 1989 (age 36)
- Place of birth: Rabat, Morocco
- Height: 1.65 m (5 ft 5 in)
- Position: Midfielder

Team information
- Current team: Wydad
- Number: 28

Youth career
- 1994–2003: SC Brest 2
- 2003–2004: AS Brestoise
- 2004–2005: FC Lorient

Senior career*
Years	Team	Apps	(Gls)
2005–2007	CNFE Clairefontaine	32	(0)
2007–2011	Stade Briochin	51	(8)
2011–2017	Guingamp	122	(37)
2017–2019	Fleury	37	(5)
2019–2020	Issy	18	(9)
2020–2021	Dijon	15	(0)
2021–2022	US Saint-Malo	25	(6)
2022–2023	Metz	21	(6)
2023–2024	Al-Ittihad	8	(4)
2024–2025	Brooklyn FC	10	(1)
2025–	Wydad	0	(0)

International career
2004–2005	France U17		
2012–	Morocco		
Medal record
Representing Morocco
Women's Africa Cup of Nations
Second place	2022 Morocco
- * Club domestic league appearances and goals as of 26 August 2025

Salma Abdulkarim Lahcen Amani (Arabic: سلمى عبد الكريم لحسن أماني; born 28 November 1989) is a Moroccan professional footballer who plays as a midfielder for Moroccan Women's Championship D1 club Wydad AC and the Morocco national team. She also holds French citizenship.

== Early life ==
Amani was born in Rabat. She left her parents and Morocco at the age of eight months to settle in France with her brothers in the city of Brest, where she grew up and was educated by her grandparents.

== Club career ==
Amani started playing football at the age of 5 at SC Brest 2, with her twin brother Salam, playing with boys until the age of 13. Amani then played with AS Brestoise for a year, and then at Lorient.

== International career ==
Amani capped for Morocco at senior level during the 2016 Africa Women Cup of Nations qualification (first round).

== Career statistics ==
=== International goals ===
No.	Date	Venue	Opponent	Score	Result	Competition
1.	18 February 2020	El Kram Stadium, El Kram, Tunisia	Tanzania	2–1	3–2	2020 UNAF Women's Tournament
2.	20 February 2020	El Kram Stadium, El Kram, Tunisia	Mauritania	1–0	5–0	2020 UNAF Women's Tournament
3.	7 April 2022	Prince Moulay Abdellah Stadium, Rabat, Morocco	Gambia	4–0	6–1	Friendly
4.	7 April 2022	Prince Moulay Abdellah Stadium, Rabat, Morocco	Gambia	6–1	6–1	Friendly
5.	11 June 2022	Prince Moulay Abdellah Stadium, Rabat, Morocco	Congo	5–0	7–0	Friendly
6.	11 June 2022	Prince Moulay Abdellah Stadium, Rabat, Morocco	Congo	6–0	7–0	Friendly

== See also ==
- List of Morocco women's international footballers
