= Jasmina Barhoumi =

Tunisian footballer (born 2002)

Personal information
- Date of birth: 8 September 2002 (age 24)
- Place of birth: Worms, Germany
- Height: 1.70 m (5 ft 7 in)
- Position: Defender

Team information
- Current team: Le Moyne Dolphins
- Number: 19

Youth career
- 2017–2019: FC Speyer 09

College career
Years	Team	Apps	(Gls)
2022	D'Youville Saints	15	(0)
2023–	Le Moyne Dolphins		

Senior career*
Years	Team	Apps	(Gls)
2019	FC Speyer 09		
2019–2020	TSV Schott Mainz		
2020–2021	1. FFC Niederkirchen	8	(0)

International career^{‡}
2021–	Tunisia	4	(0)
- * Club domestic league appearances and goals as of 6 June 2021. ‡ National team caps and goals as of 13 July 2022.

Jasmina Barhoumi (Arabic: ياسمين برهومي; born 8 September 2002) is a footballer who plays as a defender for NCAA Division I team Le Moyne Dolphins. Born in Germany, she plays for the Tunisia women's national team.

== Club career ==
Barhoumi has played for FC Speyer 09, TSV Schott Mainz and 1. FFC Niederkirchen in Germany.

== International career ==
Barhoumi has capped for Tunisia at senior level, including a 2021 Arab Women's Cup match against Lebanon on 24 August 2021.

== Collegiate career ==
Barhoumi joined the D'Youville Saints as a freshman in the 2022 season, enrolling at D'Youville University in Buffalo, NY, USA.

== See also ==
- List of Tunisia women's international footballers
