= Hanna Boubezari =

Algerian footballer (born 1998)

Personal information
- Full name: Hanna-Lina Boubezari
- Date of birth: 21 November 1998 (age 27)
- Place of birth: Kungsbacka, Sweden
- Position: Midfielder

Team information
- Current team: Real Oviedo

Senior career*
Years	Team	Apps	(Gls)
2014–2016	Umeå IK	14	(0)
2017–2019	Kungsbacka DFF	43	(4)
2020–2023	Lidkopings FK	56	(7)
2023–2024	Arna-Bjørnar	0	(0)
2024–	Real Oviedo		

International career
2019–	Algeria	4	(1)
- * Club domestic league appearances and goals

Hanna-Lina Boubezari (born 21 November 1998) is a professional footballer who plays as a midfielder for Segunda Federación club Real Oviedo. Born in Sweden, she plays for the Algeria women's national team.

== International career ==
In 2019, Boubezari was called up to the Algeria women's national football team for the first time for a pair of 2020 Olympic quailfiers against Nigeria.

In 2020, Boubezari was called up again, this time for the 2020 UNAF Women's Tournament in Tunisia. Boubezari scored a goal in the second game against Mauritania, a 5–0 win.
