= Sana Chebli =

Tunisian footballer

Personal information
- Position: Defender

International career^{‡}
Years	Team	Apps	(Gls)
2008	Tunisia	1+	(0+)
- ‡ National team caps and goals as of 8 March 2008

Sana Chebli (Arabic: سناء شبلي) is a Tunisian former footballer who played as a defender. She has been a member of the Tunisia women's national team.

== International career ==
Chebli capped for Tunisia at senior level during the 2008 African Women's Championship qualification.

== See also ==
- List of Tunisia women's international footballers
