= Aude Gbedjissi =

Beninese footballer (born 1998)

Personal information
- Date of birth: 8 December 1998 (age 27)
- Place of birth: Tori-Bossito, Benin
- Position: Forward

Team information
- Current team: Galatasaray
- Number: 98

Senior career*
Years	Team	Apps	(Gls)
2018–2021	Abdul Ivoire Service	10	(13)
2021–2022	Saint-Denis	16	(17)
2022–2023	Yzeure	21	(15)
2023–2026	RC Lens	39	(28)
2026–	Galatasaray	0	(0)

International career^{‡}
2018–	Benin	11	(4)
- * Club domestic league appearances and goals as of 11 May 2025 ‡ National team caps and goals as of 12 May 2025

Aude Gbedjissi (born 8 December 1998) is a Beninese professional footballer who plays as a forward for Turkish Women's Football Super League club Galatasaray and the Benin national team.

== Early life ==
Gbédjissi started playing football at a young age, inspired by her older brothers. Her talent was first noticed while playing in the neighborhood, prompting her to leave the village to further develop her skills. During this time, she impressed scouts at an indoor tournament in Cotonou, which led to her joining the Rosa Espérance academy in 2013.

== Club career ==
After earning her Baccalauréat in 2018, she left Benin to pursue her football career abroad, following her coach Malick Lawogni's advice. She moved to Côte d'Ivoire and joined Abdul Ivoire Service Football Club a Second Division team. Over the next three years, she showed consistent performance and discipline, earning top scorer titles in both the Second and First Divisions in the country. These achievements paved the way for her move to France.

In 2021, she joined Racing Club Saint-Denis, a Régional 1 Féminine team. where she spent six months before transferring to Yzeure in the Division 2 Féminine for the 2022–2023 season. She played one season at Yzeure, scoring 15 goals in 22 league matches across all competitions.

In August 2023, she was signed by RC Lens. In her debut season, she made 21 appearances, making her the second most capped player at Lens that season. She finished as Division 2's top scorer, with 14 goals and five assists.

On July 21, 2026, she signed a contract with the Turkish giant Galatasaray.

== International career ==
Gbedjissi is a Beninese international, having represented her country since 2018. In the 2024 Summer Olympic qualifiers in July 2023, she scored her first goal for Benin against Guinea-Bissau and followed it up with another goal in the second leg to secure Benin's progression to the next round.

=== International goals ===
No.	Date	Venue	Opponent	Score	Result	Competition
1.	14 July 2023	Estádio 24 de Setembro, Bissau, Guinea-Bissau	Guinea-Bissau	2–2	2–2	2024 CAF Olympic qualifying tournament
2.	18 July 2023	Stade de l'Amitié, Cotonou, Benin	Guinea-Bissau	2–1	3–2	2024 CAF Olympic qualifying tournament
3.	20 February 2025	Estádio 24 de Setembro, Lomé, Togo	Sierra Leone	1–0	2–1	2026 WAFCON qualification
4.	20 February 2025	Estádio 24 de Setembro, Lomé, Togo	Sierra Leone	2–1	2–1	2026 WAFCON qualification
5.	26 February 2025	Samuel Kanyon Doe Sports Complex, Monrovia, Liberia	Sierra Leone	3–0	3–1	2026 WAFCON qualification
6.	25 June 2025	Ziaida Sports Complex, Benslimane, Morocco	Ghana	1–1	2–4	International Friendly
7.	25 June 2025	Ziaida Sports Complex, Benslimane, Morocco	Ghana	2–1	2–4	International Friendly
