= Yolande Gnammi =

Beninese footballer

Personal information
- Date of birth: May 12, 2000 (age 26)
- Place of birth: Benin
- Position: Forward

Team information
- Current team: Amed
- Number: 12

Senior career*
Years	Team	Apps	(Gls)
–2023	Espoire FC	18	(27)
2023–2024	CRAH		
2024–2025	Itihad Tanger FF	25	(20)
2025–2026	AS FAR	7	(4)
2026–	Amed	10	(3)

International career
2021–	Benin	10	(5)
- * Club domestic league appearances and goals as of 14 November 2026

Yolande Gnammi (born 12 May 2000) is a Beninese footballer who plays for Amed in the Turkish Women's Super League and the Benin national team.

== Club career ==
In Benin, Gnammi played for Espoire FC de Cotonou, where she twice clinched the league's top scorer title.

In January 2023, Gnammi was recognized as the Best Player of December 2022, just before her move to Raja Aïn Harrouda in the Moroccan Championship. On 5 February 2023, she debuted for the club in a 1–0 win against Raja, where she scored the winning goal.

In July 2024, she was set to join FC Aïnonvi for their campaign in the 2024 CAF Women's Champions League WAFU Zone B Qualifiers. However, a disagreement between her current club CRAH of Morocco, and FC Aïnonvi led to the cancellation of the transfer

In September 2024, she joined fellow Moroccan side Itihad Tanger FF.

She moved to Turkey in August 2026, and signed with the Diyarbakır-based club Amed, which compete in the Women's Super League.

== International career ==
Gnammi is a Beninese international.

She scored her first international goal on 14 January 2022, in a 2–0 friendly win over Togo.

=== International goals ===
Scores and results list Benin's goal tally first.

No.	Date	Venue	Opponent	Score	Result	Competition
1.	14 January 2022	Stade de Kégué, Lomé, Togo	Togo	1–0	2–0	Friendly
2.	9 July 2023	Stade de l'Amitié, Cotonou, Benin	Burkina Faso	1–2	1–4	Friendly
3.	14 July 2023	Estádio 24 de Setembro, Bissau, Guinea-Bissau	Guinea-Bissau	1–0	2–2	2024 CAF Olympic qualifying tournament
4.	18 July 2023	Stade de l'Amitié, Cotonou, Benin	Guinea-Bissau	3–1	3–2	2024 CAF Olympic qualifying tournament
5.	22 September 2023	Stade des Martyrs, Kinshasa, DR Congo	DR Congo	1–1	1–2	2024 WAFCON qualifying
6.	26 September 2023	Stade de l'Amitié, Cotonou, Benin	DR Congo	1–0	1–2	2024 WAFCON qualifying
7.	2 March 2026	Felix Houphouet Boigny Stadium, Abidjan, Ivory Coast	Kenya	2–0	2–0	Friendly
8.	14 April 2026	Complexe Sportif Manouba, Tunis, Tunisia	Comoros	2–0	2–0	Friendly
9.	11 July 2026	Stade Militaire, Yaoundé, Cameroon	Cameroon	1–0	1–3	Friendly
