= Ange Bawou =

Cameroonian footballer (born 2000)

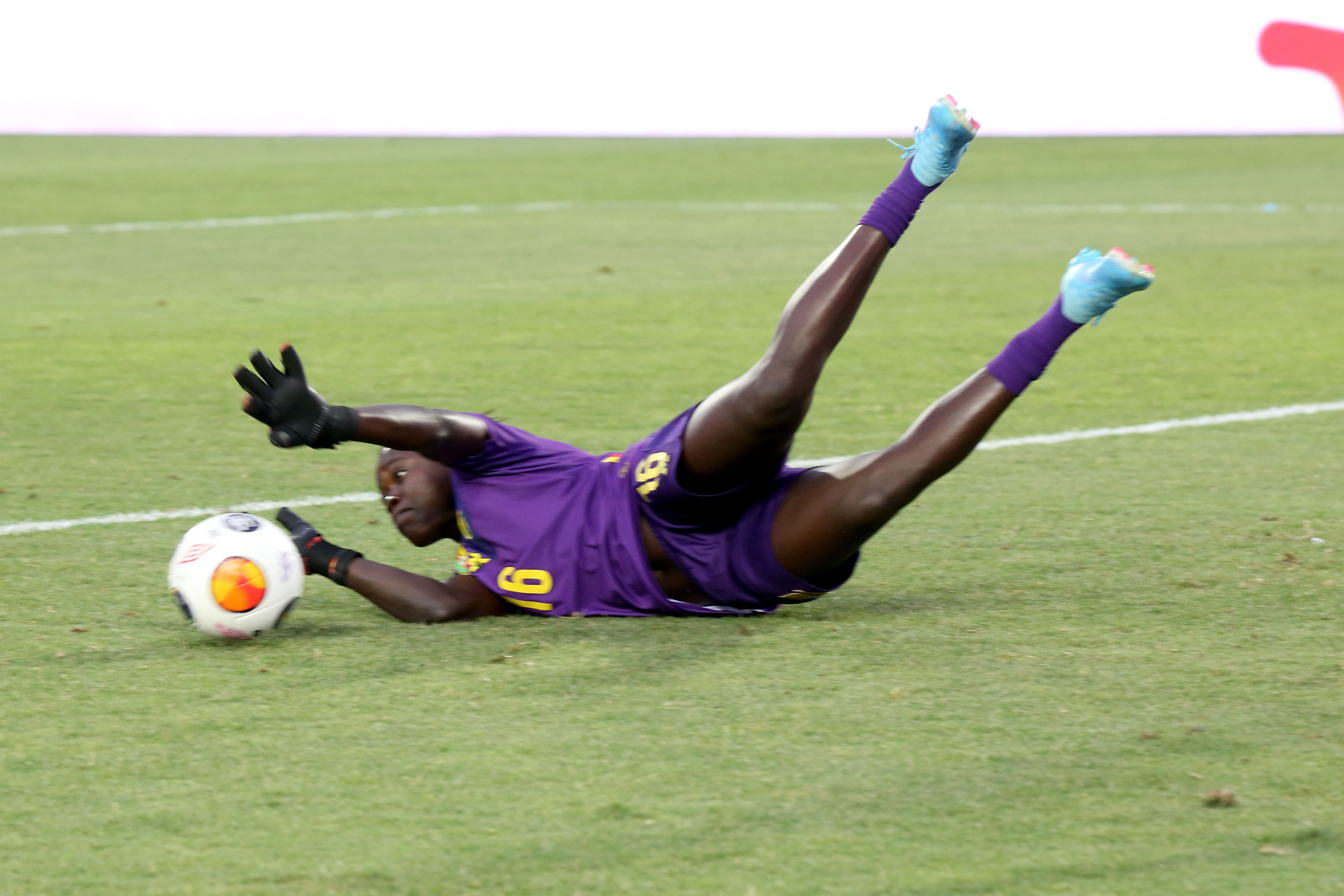

Personal information
- Full name: Ange Gabrielle Bawou
- Date of birth: 12 February 2000 (age 26)
- Place of birth: Cameroon
- Height: 1.80 m (5 ft 11 in)
- Position: Goalkeeper

Team information
- Current team: Louves Miniproff

Senior career*
Years	Team	Apps	(Gls)
- Bayelsa Queens

International career^{‡}
2019	Cameroon U20		
2019–	Cameroon	2	(0)
Medal record
Women's Africa Cup of Nations
Gold medal – first place	2026 Morocco
- * Club domestic league appearances and goals ‡ National team caps and goals as of 12 November 2019

Ange Gabrielle Bawou (born 12 February 2000) is a Cameroonian footballer who plays as a goalkeeper for Bayelsa Queens and the Cameroon women's national team.

Before joining Bayelsa Queens, she played for Louves Miniproff.

== Club career ==
Bawou has played for Louves Miniproff in Cameroon.

== International career ==
Bawou has won the silver medal at the 2019 African Games with the Cameroon women's national under-20 team. She capped at senior level during the 2020 CAF Women's Olympic Qualifying Tournament.
