= Salima Jobrani =

Tunisian footballer (born 1997)

Soulayma Jebrani
Personal information
- Date of birth: 25 February 1997 (age 29)
- Position: Goalkeeper

Team information
- Current team: Yüksekova
- Number: 16

Senior career*
Years	Team	Apps	(Gls)
–2021	ASF Sousse		
2021	Fatih Vatan Spor	2	(0)
2021–2022	Kireçburnu Spor	12	
2022–2023	Al Ahli SFC		
2023–	Al-Riyadh		
2025–	Yüksekova	0	(0)

International career
- Tunisia
- * Club domestic league appearances and goals as of 13 February 2022

Soulayma Jebrani (Arabic: سليمة جبراني; born 25 February 1997) is a Tunisian footballer plays for the Turkish Super League club Yüksekova in Hakkari, and the Tunisia women's national team.

== Club career ==
Jebrani has played for Women's Association of Sousse in Tunisia.

In December 2021, she moved to Turkey and joined the Women's Super League club Fatih Vatan Spor.

In September 2025, she moved to Turkey, and signed with Yüksekova to play in the Super League.

== International career ==
Jebrani has capped for Tunisia at senior level, including in a 2–1 friendly away win over Jordan on 10 June 2021.

== See also ==
- List of Tunisia women's international footballers
