= Salma Zemzem =

Footballer (born 2000)

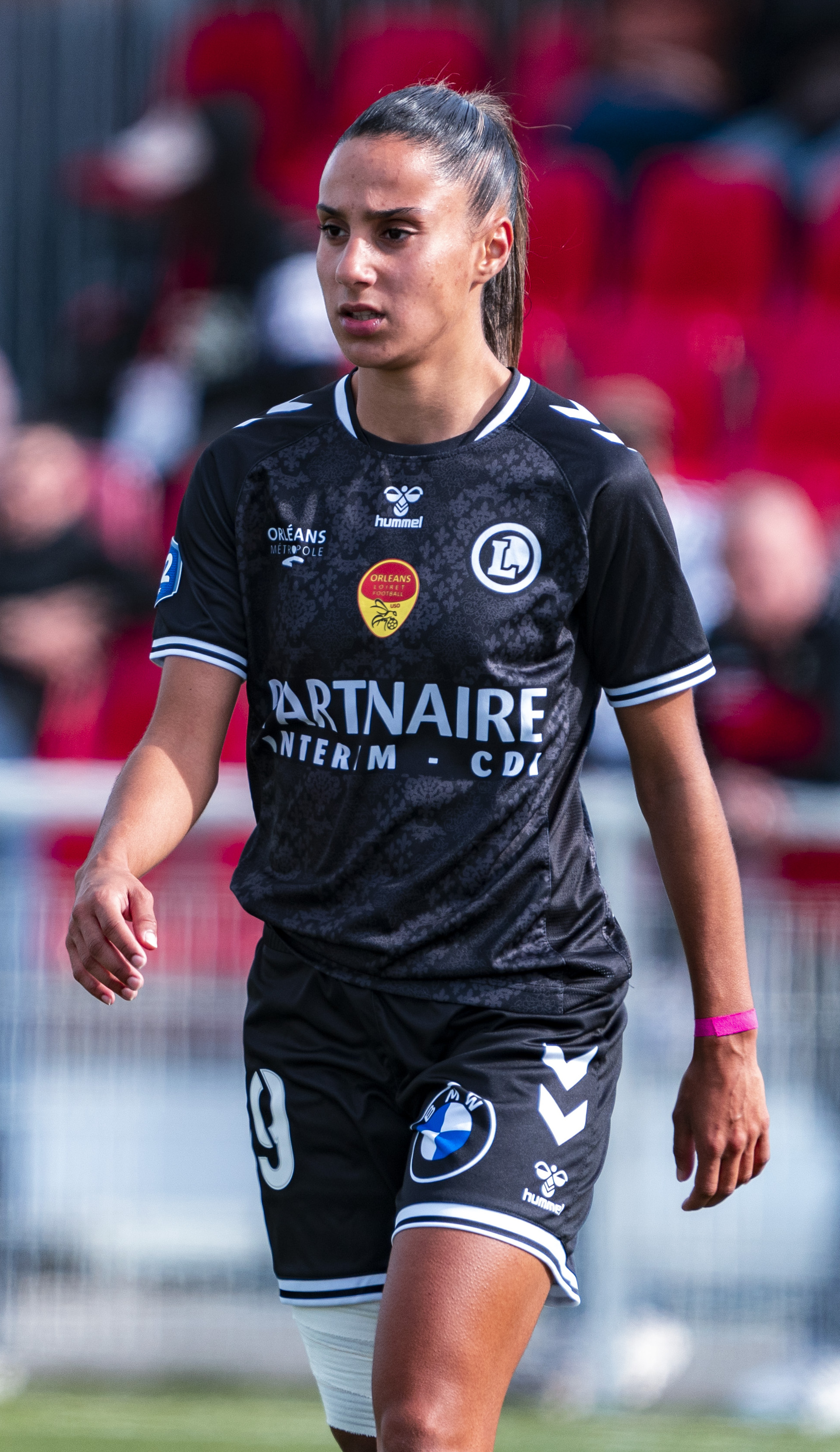
- Zemzem with Orléans in 2023

Personal information
- Date of birth: 7 April 2000 (age 26)
- Place of birth: Paris, France
- Height: 1.59 m (5 ft 3 in)
- Position: Striker

Team information
- Current team: Thonon Evian
- Number: 9

Senior career*
Years	Team	Apps	(Gls)
2018–2020	VGA Saint-Maur	15	(8)
2020–2021	GPSO 92 Issy	17	(2)
2021–2022	ASPTT Albi	22	(16)
2022–2024	Orléans	43	(11)
2024–	Thonon Evian	0	(0)

International career
2016	France U16	6	(1)
2023–	Tunisia	11	(5)
- * Club domestic league appearances and goals as of 15:26, 11 August 2024 (UTC)

Salma Zemzem (Arabic: سلمى زمزم; born 7 April 2000) is a professional footballer who plays as a striker for Seconde Ligue club Thonon Evian. Born in France, she plays for the Tunisia national team.

== Early life ==
Zemzem was born to a Moroccan mother and a Tunisian father. She is a native of Île-de-France, France. Zemzem started playing football at the age of five. She joined the youth academy of French side Paris Saint-Germain FC at the age of thirteen. She helped the club win the league.

== Career ==
Zemzem started her career with French side VGA Saint-Maur. In 2020, she signed for French side GPSO 92 Issy. In 2021, she signed for French side ASPTT Albi. In 2022, she signed for French side US Orléans.

On 13 July 2024, Zemzem joined Thonon Evian.

== International career ==
Zemzem represented France internationally at youth level. She debuted for the Tunisia women's national football team for the 2024 Women's Africa Cup of Nations qualification.

== Style of play ==
Zemzem mainly operates as a striker. She has played in a deeper role while playing for her clubs compared to playing for the Tunisia women's national football team.

== Personal life ==
She has regarded Portugal international Cristiano Ronaldo as her male football idol. She has regarded France international Eugenie Le Sommer as her female football idol.
