= Chirine Lamti =

Danish–Tunisian footballer (born 1994)

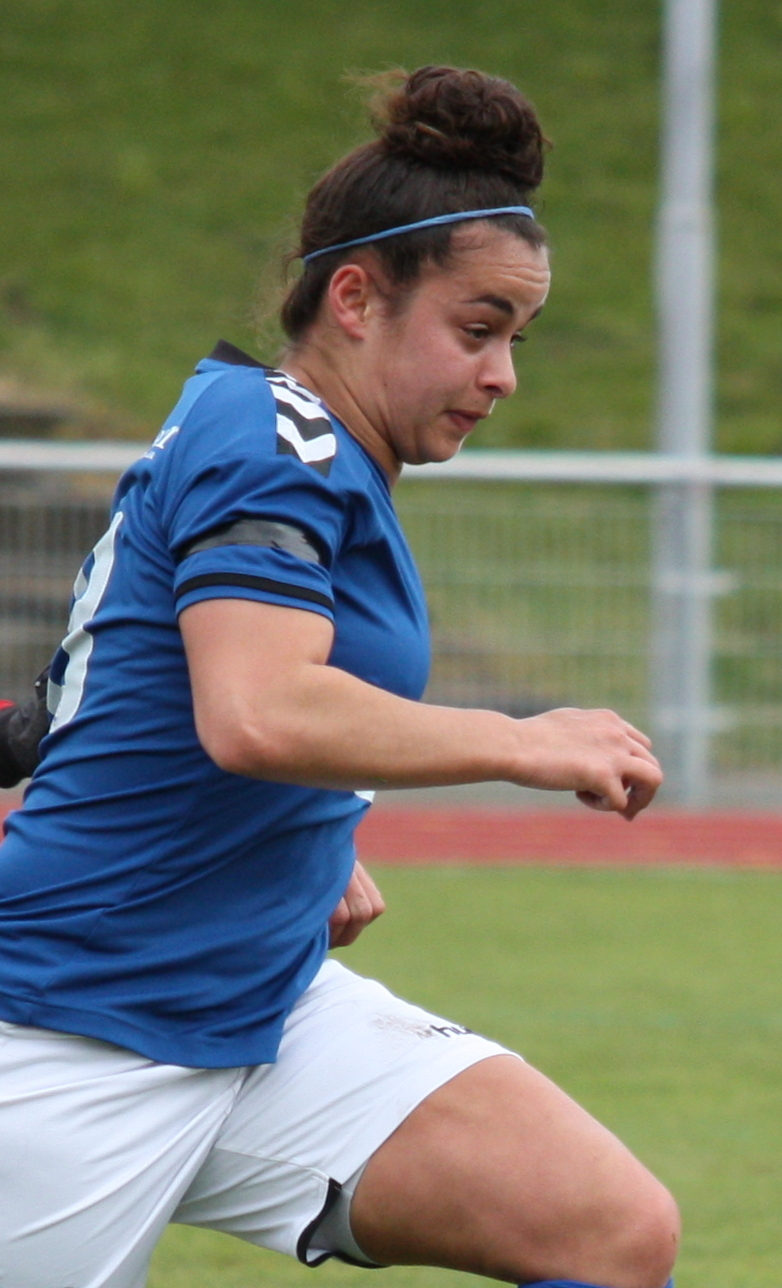

Personal information
- Date of birth: 13 September 1994 (age 32)
- Place of birth: Copenhagen, Denmark
- Position: Midfielder

Senior career*
Years	Team	Apps	(Gls)
2012–2017	Brøndby	9	(1)
2017	Greve		
2017–2019	BSF	5	(1)
2019–2021	Brøndby	24	(1)
2021–2022	Slavia Prague	18	(1)
2022	FC Tarascon		
2022–2023	Venezia	17	(1)
2023–	Cesena	52	(2)

International career
2021–	Tunisia	6+	(2+)
- * Club domestic league appearances and goals as of 31 July 2025

Chirine Lamti (Arabic: شيرين اللمطي; born 13 September 1994) is a footballer who currently plays as a midfielder for Italian Serie B club Cesena. Born in Denmark, she represents Tunisia at international level

== Club career ==
=== Slavia Prague ===
In July 2021, Lamti joined Slavia Prague.

=== Venezia F.C. ===
In October 2022, she joined Venezia.

=== Cesena F.C. ===
In August 2023, she joined Cesena.

== International career ==
Lamti, who has dual Danish nationality, made her debut for the Tunisia national team on 10 June 2021, playing the full match against Jordan.

=== International goals ===
Scores and results list Tunisia's goal tally first

No.	Date	Venue	Opponent	Score	Result	Competition	Ref.
1	31 January 2020	Stade Municipal de Témara, Témara, Morocco	Morocco	1	3–6	Friendly	
1	13 June 2021	King Abdullah II Stadium, Amman, Jordan	Jordan	1	2–0	Friendly	

== See also ==
- List of Tunisia women's international footballers
