= Benin women's national football team =

Benin
- Association: Benin Football Federation
- Confederation: CAF (Africa)
- Sub-confederation: WAFU (West Africa)
- Head coach: Vacant
- Captain: None
- Most caps: Unknown
- Top scorer: Bouraïma Bathily (1)
- Home stadium: Stade de l'Amitié
- FIFA code: BEN
First colours	Second colours

FIFA ranking
- Current: 139 ▼1 (16 June 2026)
- Highest: 96 (September 2006)
- Lowest: 152 (December 2023 – December 2024)

First international
- Benin 1–0 Malawi (Benin; 19 February 2006)

Biggest win
- Togo 0–2 Benin (Lomé, Togo; 14 January 2022); Sierra Leone 1–3 Benin (Bo, Sierra Leone; 25 February 2025); Kenya 0–2 Benin (Abidjan, Ivory Coast; 2 March 2026); Benin 3–1 Mali (Lomé, Togo; 8 October 2026)

Biggest defeat
- Senegal 5–1 Benin (Dakar, Senegal; 19 May 2006); Burkina Faso 6–2 Benin (Ouagadougou, Burkina Faso; 17 December 2019); Burkina Faso 4–0 Benin (Ouagadougou, Burkina Faso; 19 December 2019); Mali 6–2 Benin (Bamako, Mali; 13 October 2026)

The Benin women's national football team represents Benin in international women's football. It is governed by the Benin Football Federation. It never reached the African Championship or the World Cup finals.

Benin's participation in the African Championships consists of only one qualification tournament, in 2006. Benin beat Malawi at home, and therefore moved through the first qualification round. They then drew 1–1 with Ivory Coast, and won in a penalty shootout. In the second round, Benin met Mali, and lost both matches.

Benin also entered the 2008 African Championships, but then pulled out before the tournament began. Their 2006 home defeat to Mali was therefore the last match Benin has played in so far.

== History ==
=== 2006 African Women's Championship ===
The national team of Benin played its first match against Malawi on February 19, 2006; in the qualifying tournament of the 2006 African Women's Championship, which was held in Nigeria. Benin won the match by a score of 1–0, but the goalscorer was unknown. The second leg was played on February 26, 2006; this time it ended with a 0–0 draw. Benin advanced to the First Round due to an aggregate score of 1–0. In the First Round, Benin was paired with Ivory Coast and drew both matches by scores of 1–1. In the second match when it was still 1–1 after extra time, Benin won in a penalty shoot-out by a score of 4–3 and they advanced to the Second Round. In the Second Round, Benin met Mali. In the first leg, on July 22, 2006; Benin lost the match 3–1, and their only goal in the game was scored by Bouraïma Bathily, the only known goalscorer for Benin. The second leg, played on August 6, 2006, was a 1–0 loss and also so far the last match that Benin played, in which they lost by one goal. Thus, Benin was eliminated from the tournament by an aggregate score of 4–1.

=== 2008 Olympic Games qualifying ===
Benin was paired with Namibia in the preliminary round for the 2008 Olympic Games Football Tournament in China, but they withdrew.

=== 2008 African Women's Championship ===
Once again Benin withdrew from a tournament, after being paired with Guinea in the First Round of the 2008 African Women's Championship qualification. The tournament was held in Equatorial Guinea.

=== 2022 Women's Africa Cup of Nations ===
Benin did not qualify for the 2022 Women's Africa Cup of Nations.

== Team image ==
=== Nicknames ===
The Benin women's national football team has been known or nicknamed as the " ".

=== Home stadium ===
The Benin women's national football team plays their home matches at the Stade de l'Amitié.

== Results and fixtures ==
The following is a list of match results in the last 12 months, as well as any future matches that have been scheduled.

Partial results are shown in parentheses.

Legend

Win Draw Lose Fixture

=== 2025 ===
24 October 2026 WAFCON qualifying	Benin	0–2	Nigeria	Lomé, Togo
14:00 GMT		Report	Ihezuo 25'; Okoronkwo 45+2'	Stadium: Stade de Kégué; Referee: Fatou Ngum (The Gambia)

28 October 2026 WAFCON qualifying	Nigeria	1–1	Benin	Abeokuta, Nigeria
15:00 GMT	Plumptre 12'	Report	Djibril 61'	Stadium: MKO Abiola Stadium; Referee: Dominique Hanjavola (Madagascar)

=== 2026 ===
28 February Friendly	Ivory Coast	2–1	Benin	Abidjan, Côte d'Ivoire
17:00 GMT	Séry 18'; Konan 29'	Report	Gandonou 60' (pen.)	Stadium: Felix Houphouet Boigny Stadium

2 March Friendly	Kenya	0–2	Benin	Abidjan, Côte d'Ivoire
17:00 GMT		Report	Sadikou 11'; Gnammi 65'	Stadium: Felix Houphouet Boigny Stadium

12 April Friendly	Tunisia	1–0	Benin	Tunis, Tunisia
13:00 GMT	Houij 89'	Report		Stadium: El Kram Stadium; Referee: Dorsaf Ganouati (Tunisia)

14 April Friendly	Benin	2–0	Comoros	Tunis, Tunisia
15:00 GMT	Sadikou 6'; Gnammi 28'	Report		Stadium: Complexe Sportif Manouba

5 June Friendly	Morocco	4–2	Benin	Rabat, Morocco
19:00 UTC+1	Jraïdi 13'; Ouzraoui 26' (pen.); Nakkach 43'; Nassi 80'	Report	Sadikou 23'; Fachinan 88'	Stadium: Moulay El Hassan Stadium

9 June Friendly	Morocco U23	3–2	Benin	Rabat, Morocco
11:00 GMT		Report	Gandonou 13'	Stadium: Rabat Sports Complex

11 July Friendly	Cameroon	3–1	Benin	Yaoundé, Cameroon
15:00 GMT	Ngueleu 51', 54'; Ngah Manga 80'	Report	Gnammi 5'	Stadium: Stade Militaire; Referee: Aïcha Bit Oumarou (Chad)

8 October 2026 2028 Olympic Qualification Second round	Benin	3–1	Mali

13 October 2026 2028 Olympic Qualification Second round	Mali	6–2	Benin

== Coaching staff ==
=== Current coaching staff ===
As of 1 July 2023

Position	Name	Ref.
Head coach	(Benin) Immaculée Agbakou	
Assistant coach	(Benin) Frédéric Hounkponou	

=== Manager history ===
- Unknown (2006)
- Vacant (20??–2021)
- Symphorien Téhou(2021–2023)
- (Benin) Immaculée Agbakou(2023-2024)
- (Benin) Abdoulaye Ozérou(2025-)

== Players ==
=== Current squad ===
The following players were called up for the 2026 Women's Africa Cup of Nations qualification matches against Nigeria on 24 and 28 October 2025.

No.	Pos.	Player	Date of birth (age)	Club
1	GK	Diane Ogoun		(Equatoguinean Football Federation) Leones Vegetarianos FC
16	GK	Sourakatou Alassane	19 February 2002 (age 24)	(Equatoguinean Football Federation) 15 de Agosto
23	GK	Alicia Assogba	11 November 2004 (age 21)	(French Football Federation) FCE Mérignac-Arlac
2	DF	Martine Hessanon	30 December 2002 (age 23)	(Royal Moroccan Football Federation) US Yacoub El Mansour
4	DF	Naïlatou Sadikou	2 February 2007 (age 19)	(German Football Association) SC Freiburg
12	DF	Déo-Gratias Ebi	13 December 2008 (age 17)	(Benin Football Federation) AS UMSA
15	DF	Kadidjath Orou Karo	25 February 2001 (age 25)	(Benin Football Federation) Élite AC
24	DF	Rachidath Moumouni	27 February 2005 (age 21)	Free agent
	DF	Laura Abikou		(Benin Football Federation) AS UMSA
6	MF	Jocelyne Techri	30 September 2007 (age 19)	(Benin Football Federation) AS Gamia
10	MF	Noélie Abamon (Captain)	25 December 2002 (age 23)	(French Football Federation) Bergerac Périgord FC
14	MF	Yasminath Djibril	13 March 2006 (age 20)	(Benin Football Federation) Ainonvi FC
20	MF	Marguérite Ahouassou	15 February 2004 (age 22)	(Benin Football Federation) AS UMSA
25	MF	Lucie Tengue	10 August 2001 (age 25)	(French Football Federation) OGC Nice
	MF	Estelle Vidinhouede	19 July 2008 (age 18)	(Benin Football Federation) AS UMSA
	MF	Eunice Sagbohan		(Benin Football Federation) CEFoS
	MF	Ruth Hounhoue		(Benin Football Federation) AS JFA
	MF	Déborah Adingni		(Benin Football Federation) Élite AC
9	FW	Yolande Gnammi	12 May 2000 (age 26)	(Royal Moroccan Football Federation) AS FAR
11	FW	Léa Fachinan	5 June 2001 (age 25)	(French Football Federation) Clermont Foot 63
13	FW	Kadidjatou Imorou	25 February 2001 (age 25)	(Benin Football Federation) Élite AC
18	FW	Romaine Gandonou	13 November 2010 (age 15)	(Benin Football Federation) Tambours FC
19	FW	Germaine Honfo	28 May 2007 (age 19)	(Royal Moroccan Football Federation) AM Laâyoune
22	FW	Milhad Sadikou	1 August 2003 (age 23)	(French Football Federation) AJ Auxerre
	FW	Aude Gbedjissi	8 December 1998 (age 27)	(French Football Federation) RC Lens

=== Recent call-ups ===
The following players have been called up to a Benin squad in the past 12 months.

Pos.	Player	Date of birth (age)	Caps	Goals	Club	Latest call-up

== Records ==
=== Individual records ===
*Active players in bold, statistics correct as of 6 September 2021.

==== Most appearances ====
#	Player	Year(s)	Caps

==== Top goalscorers ====
#	Player	Year(s)	Goals	Caps
**1**	Bouraïma Bathily	20??–20??	1	??

== Competitive record ==
=== FIFA Women's World Cup ===
FIFA Women's World Cup
Year	Result	GP	W	D	L	GF	GA	GD
(China) 1991	Did Not Enter							
(Sweden) 1995	Did Not Enter							
(United States) 1999	Did Not Enter							
(United States) 2003	Did Not Enter							
(China) 2007	Did not qualify							
(Germany) 2011	Did Not Enter							
(Canada) 2015	Did Not Enter							
(France) 2019	Did not qualify							
(Australia) (New Zealand) 2023	Did not qualify							
(Brazil) 2027	Did not qualify							
(Costa Rica) (Jamaica) (Mexico) (United States) 2031	To be determined							
(United Kingdom) 2035	To be determined							
**Total**	0/12	-	-	-	-	-	-	-

*Draws include knockout matches decided on penalty kicks.

=== Olympic Games ===
Summer Olympics
Year	Result	Matches	Wins	Draws	Losses	GF	GA
(United States) 1996	Did Not Enter						
(Australia) 2000	Did Not Enter						
(Greece) 2004	Did Not Enter						
(China) 2008	Withdrew						
(United Kingdom) 2012	Did Not Enter						
(Brazil) 2016	Did Not Enter						
(Japan) 2020	Did Not Enter						
(France) 2024	Did Not Enter						
(United States) 2028	To be determined						
Total	0/9	0	0	0	0	0	0

=== Africa Women Cup of Nations ===
Africa Women Cup of Nations
Year	Result	Matches	Wins	Draws	Losses	GF	GA
1991	Did Not Enter						
1995	Did Not Enter						
(Nigeria) 1998	Did Not Enter						
(South Africa) 2000	Did Not Enter						
(Nigeria) 2002	Did Not Enter						
(South Africa) 2004	Did Not Enter						
(Nigeria) 2006	Did not qualify						
(Equatorial Guinea) 2008	Withdrew						
(South Africa) 2010	Did Not Enter						
(Equatorial Guinea) 2012	Did Not Enter						
(Namibia) 2014	Did Not Enter						
(Cameroon) 2016	Did Not Enter						
(Ghana) 2018	Did Not Enter						
2020	Cancelled due to COVID-19						
(Morocco) 2022	Did not qualify						
(Morocco) 2024	Did not qualify						
(Morocco) 2026	Did not qualify						
**Total**	0/16	-	-	-	-	-	-

=== African Games ===
African Games
Year	Result	Matches	Wins	Draws	Losses	GF	GA
(Nigeria) 2003	Did Not Enter						
(Algeria) 2007	Did Not Enter						
(Mozambique) 2011	Did Not Enter						
(Republic of the Congo) 2015	Did Not Enter						
(Morocco) 2019	See Benin women's national under-20 football team						
(Ghana) 2023	See Benin women's national under-20 football team						
Total	0/4	0	0	0	0	0	0

- 2019 and 2023 editions of the football tournament was played by the U-20 team.

See Benin women's national under-20 football team

=== WAFU Women's Cup record ===
WAFU Zone B Women's Cup
Year	Result	Position	Pld	W	D	L	GF	GA
(Ivory Coast) 2018	Did not enter							
(Ivory Coast) 2019	Did not enter							
Total		0/2	0	0	0	0	0	0

== Head-to-head record ==
As of 5 November 2014

Against	Played	Won	Drawn	Lost	GF	GA	GD
Congo	1	0	0	1	1	2	−1
Equatorial Guinea	1	0	0	1	2	3	−1
Guinea	1	1	0	0	3	2	+1
Ivory Coast	3	1	2	0	5	4	+1
Malawi	2	1	1	0	1	0	+1
Mali	2	0	0	2	1	4	−3
Senegal	1	0	0	1	1	5	−4
Total	11	3	3	5	14	20	−6

== See also ==
- Sport in Benin
  - Football in Benin
    - Women's football in Benin
- Benin national football team
- Africa Women Cup of Nations
- List of women's national association football teams
