= Rania Aouina =

Tunisian footballer (born 1994)

Personal information
- Date of birth: 5 May 1994 (age 32)
- Place of birth: Medenine, Tunisia
- Position: Midfielder

Team information
- Current team: Al-Shoulla

Senior career*
Years	Team	Apps	(Gls)
2018–2019	Strasbourg Vauban	22	(1)
2019–2020	Saint-Denis	16	(0)
2021	Adana İdman Yurdu		
2021–2022	Thonon Évian		
2022–2023	US Saint-Malo		
2023–2024	SV Horn		
2024	FCU Olimpia Cluj		
2024–	Al-Shoulla		

International career^{‡}
2014–	Tunisia	2+	(0+)
- * Club domestic league appearances and goals as of 29 February 2020. ‡ National team caps and goals as of 5 March 2016.

Rania Aouina (Arabic: رانيا عوينة; born 5 May 1994) is a Tunisian footballer who plays as a midfielder for Saudi club Al-Shoulla and the Tunisia women's national team.

== Club career ==
Aouina had played for Strasbourg Vauban, Saint-Denis, Thonon Évian and US Saint-Malo in France. She later joined Austrian side SV Horn and Romanian club FCU Olimpia Cluj.

== International career ==
Aouina capped for Tunisia at senior level during two Africa Women Cup of Nations qualifications (2014 and 2016).

== See also ==
- List of Tunisia women's international footballers
