= Mariem Houij =

Tunisian footballer (born 1994)

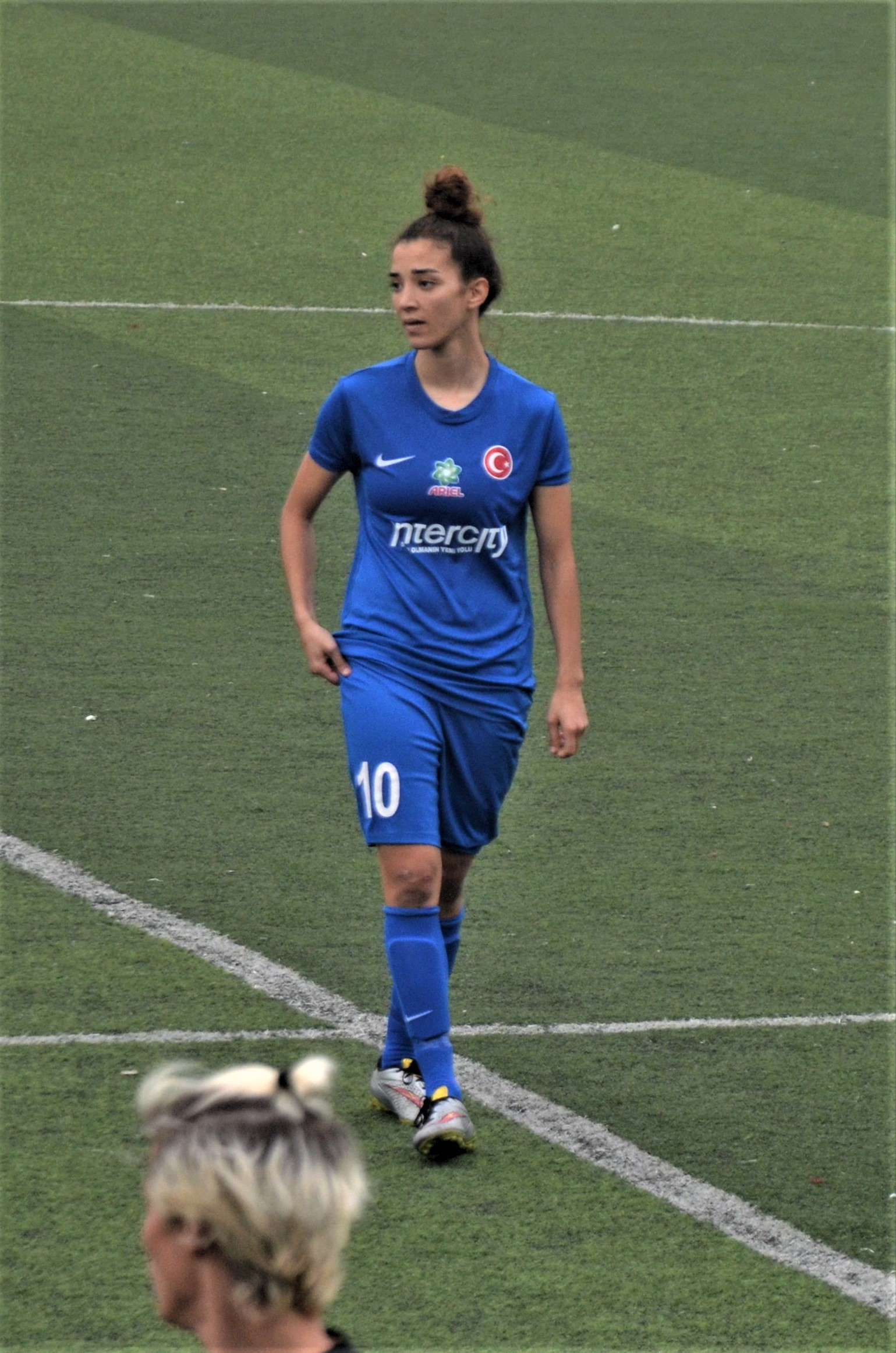
- Houij for Ataşehir in the 2018–19 Turkish Women's First League.

Personal information
- Date of birth: 8 August 1994 (age 32)
- Place of birth: Sousse, Tunisia
- Position: Forward

Team information
- Current team: Ünye
- Number: 7

Senior career*
Years	Team	Apps	(Gls)
2017–2018	Vendenheim	10	(3)
2018–2021	Ataşehir	35	(35)
2021–2023	ALG	42	(37)
2023–2024	Galatasaray	12	(2)
2024–	Abha	11	(16)
2025–2026	Yüksekova	20	(19)
2026–	Ünye	9	(1)

International career^{‡}
2012–	Tunisia	45	(15)
- * Club domestic league appearances and goals as of 14 November 2026 ‡ National team caps and goals as of 10 January 2024

Mariem "Maryama" Houij (born 8 August 1994) is a Tunisian footballer, who plays as a forward forTurkish Super League club Ünye and the Tunisia women's national team.

== Club career ==
=== Vendenheim ===
She played in the Championnat de France de Football Féminine de Division 2 – Group B for the French club Vendenheim. She capped in 13 matches in the 2017–18 season.

=== Ataşehir ===
Houij joined the Istanbul-based team Ataşehir on 20 July 2018. She took part at the 2018–19 UEFA Women's Champions League qualifying round. She played in all three matches of the qualification round, and scored two goals.

International goals
Date	Venue	Opponent	Competition	Result	Scored
Ataşehir
13 August 2018	III. Kerületi TVE Stadion, Budapest, Hungary	(Kosovo) Mitrovic	2018–19 UEFA Women's Champions League	W 6–1	2

=== ALG ===
In the 2021-22 Turkish Women's Super League season, she transferred to the Gaziantep-based club ALG. She enjoyed the 2021-22 Women's Super League champion title of her team. On 18 August 2022, she played in the 2022–23 UEFA Women's Champions League.

=== Galatasaray ===
She signed a one-year contract with Galatasaray on 4 August 2023.

=== Abha ===
She joined the Abha to compete with them in the 2024–25 Saudi Women's First Division League and contributed to her team achieving second place and qualifying for the 2025–26 Saudi Women's Premier League.

=== Yüksekova ===
Returned from Saudi Arabia to Turkey, she joined Yüksekova in Hakkari Province in September 2025, which was recently promoted to the Turkish Super League.

=== Ünye ===
For the 2026-27 Turkish Women's Super League season, she transferred to Ünye.

== International career ==
She was a member of the Tunisia women's national football team at the 2014 African Women's Championship qualification, played in all two matches each of the First and Second Round, and scored one goal.

International goals
Date	Venue	Opponent	Competition	Result	Scored
Tunisia women's national football team
28 January 2012	Soliman, Tunisia	Morocco	2012 African Women's Championship qualification	W 2–0	2
1 March 2014	Stade 15 Octobre, Bizerte, Tunisia	Egypt	2014 African Women's Championship qualification	D 2–2	1
31 January 2020	Stade Municipal de Témara, Témara, Morocco	Morocco	Friendly	L 3–6	1
22 February 2020	El Kram Stadium, El Kram, Tunisia	Tanzania	2020 UNAF Women's Tournament	D 1–1	1
4 October 2021	Theyab Awana Stadium, Dubai, United Arab Emirates	India	Friendly	W 1–0	1
6 October 2021	Theyab Awana Stadium, Dubai, United Arab Emirates	United Arab Emirates	Friendly	W 4–0	1
20 October 2021	Petro Sport Stadium, Cairo, Egypt	Egypt	2022 Africa Women Cup of Nations qualification	W 6-2	1
26 October 2021	Stade El Menzah , Tunis, Tunisia	Egypt	2022 Africa Women Cup of Nations qualification	W 1-0	1
18 February 2022	Stade Municipal de Soliman, Soliman, Tunisia	Equatorial Guinea	2022 Africa Women Cup of Nations qualification	W 5-0	3
22 February 2022	Estadio de Malabo, Malabo, Equatorial Guinea	Equatorial Guinea	2022 Africa Women Cup of Nations qualification	L 2-3	1
3 July 2022	Stade Mohammed V, Casablanca, Marocoo	Togo	2022 Africa Women Cup of Nations	W 4-1	1
5 June 2026	EFA Center, Cairo, Egypt	Egypt	Friendly	L 1-1 (2–4 p)	1

== Career statistics ==
As of match played 14 November 2026.

Club	Season	League			Continental		National		Total	
Club	Season	Division	Apps	Goals	Apps	Goals	Apps	Goals	Apps	Goals
Vendenheim	2017-18	D2 Féminine	10	3	0	0	0	0	10	3
Ataşehir	2018–19	First League	16	15	3	2			19	17
Ataşehir	2019–20	First League	15	18	-	-			15	18
Ataşehir	2020–21	First League	4	2	–	–	4	2	8	4
Ataşehir	Total		35	35	3	2	4	2	42	39
ALG	2021–22	Super League	27	29	–	–	5	7	32	36
ALG	2022–23	Super League	15	8	1	0			16	8
ALG	Total		42	37	1	0	5	7	48	44
Galatasaray	2023-24	Super League	12	2	0	0	0	0	12	2
Yüksekova	2025-26	Super League	20	19	0	0	0	0	20	19
Ünye	2026-27	Super League	9	1	0	0	0	0	9	1
Total career			128	97	4	2	9	9	143	108

== Personal life ==
Mariem Houij was born in Sousse, Tunisia on 8 August 1994.

== Honours ==
=== Club ===
Turkish Women's Football Super League

ALG
Champions (1): 2021-22

=== Individual ===
- Top goalscorer: 2018–19 (15 goals)

== See also ==
- List of Tunisia women's international footballers
