= Sabrine Ellouzi =

Dutch–Tunisian footballer

Personal information
- Date of birth: 28 June 1997 (age 29)
- Place of birth: Hengelo, Netherlands
- Position: Forward

Team information
- Current team: Excelsior
- Number: 9

Youth career
- –2010: HVV Hengelo
- 2010–2015: Twente

Senior career*
Years	Team	Apps	(Gls)
2015–2021	Twente	82	(9)
2021–2022	Excelsior	23	(7)
2022–2023	Feyenoord	20	(1)
2023–	Excelsior	22	(6)

International career^{‡}
2021–	Tunisia	6	(6)
- * Club domestic league appearances and goals as of 01:02, 3 June 2024 (UTC) ‡ National team caps and goals as of 21:35, 17 July 2022 (UTC)

Sabrine Ellouzi (Arabic: صابرين اللوزي; born 28 June 1997) is a Tunisian footballer who plays as a forward for Eredivisie club Excelsior. Born in the Netherlands, she represents Tunisia at international level.

== Club career ==
=== Twente ===
Ellouzi started her career at HVV Hengelo. She joined Twente in 2010, having progressed from the academy to the first team in 2015. Ellouzi made her league debut against PSV on 29 January 2016. She scored her first league goal against VV Alkmaar on 8 October 2016, scoring in the 56th minute.

=== First spell at Excelsior ===
On 25 May 2021, Ellouzi was announced at Excelsior. She made her league debut against Ajax on 27 August 2021. She scored her first league goal against Twente on 1 October 2021, scoring a penalty in the 74th minute.

=== Feyenoord ===
On 4 May 2022, Ellouzi was announced at Feyenoord. She made her league debut against Excelsior on 16 September 2022. Ellouzi scored her first league goal against Twente on 7 May 2023, scoring in the 13th minute.

=== Second spell at Excelsior ===
On 30 May 2023, Ellouzi was announced at Excelsior. She made her league debut against AZ on 8 September 2023. Ellouzi scored her first league goal against SC Telstar VVNH on 20 October 2023, scoring in the 59th minute.

== International career ==
Ellouzi has dual Dutch and Tunisian nationality. She was approached by the Tunisia to play for the national team. She scored on her Tunisia international debut against Morocco on 31 January 2020, scoring in the 82nd minute. Ellouzi played on 10 June 2021, starting the match against Jordan.

In 2023, she was nominated along with 29 other players as a Player of the Year at the CAF Awards.

== Personal life ==
Ellouzi has a food blog, Food by Sab, and studies Sports Science Management.

== Career statistics ==
Scores and results list Tunisia's goal tally first

No.	Date	Venue	Opponent	Score	Result	Competition	Ref.
1	31 January 2020	Stade Municipal de Témara, Témara, Morocco	Morocco	1	3–6	Friendly	
2	30 August 2021	Police Academy Stadium, Cairo, Egypt	Egypt	1	2–2	2021 Arab Women's Cup	
3	3 September 2021	Osman Ahmed Osman Stadium, Cairo, Egypt	Algeria	1	2–2	2021 Arab Women's Cup	
4	20 October 2021	Petro Sport Stadium, Cairo, Egypt	Egypt	1	6–2	2022 Africa Women Cup of Nations qualification	
5	18 February 2022	Stade Municipal de Soliman, Soliman, Tunisia	Equatorial Guinea	2	5–0	2022 Africa Women Cup of Nations qualification	
6	3 July 2022	Stade Mohammed V, Casablanca, Marocoo	Togo	2	4–1	2022 Africa Women Cup of Nations	

== See also ==
- List of Tunisia women's international footballers
