= List of Tunisia women's international footballers =

This is a non-exhaustive list of Tunisia women's international footballers – association football players who have appeared at least once for the senior Tunisia women's national football team.

== Players ==
Key
**Bold**	Named to the national team in the past year

Name	Caps	Goals	National team years	Club(s)	Ref.
**Chaima Abbassi**	2+	0+		(Tunisia) AS Banque de l'habitat	
Marwa Abidi	1+	1+			
Nassima Abidi	1+	1+		Retired	
**Rania Aouina**				(France) Thonon Évian	
**Samia Aouni**				(Jordan) Amman Sport Club	
**Ghada Ayadi**				(Jordan) Amman Sport Club	
Doha Baccouchi				Retired	
**Jasmina Barhoumi**				(Germany) 1. FFC Niederkirchen	
Hadia Ben Abdelghani					
Hasna Ben Amor				Retired	
Islem Ben Chaabane					
Oumayma Ben Maaouia				Retired	
**Chaima Ben Mohamed**				(Tunisia) AS Banque de l'habitat	
Ameni Boukari				Retired	
Maroua Chebbi					
Sana Chebli				Retired	
**Sabrine Ellouzi**				(Netherlands) Excelsior	
Rahma Ghars					
**Dhekra Gomri**				(Tunisia) AS Banque de l'habitat	
Haifa Guedri				Retired	
**Hanna Hamdi**				(Germany) Borussia Bocholt	
Mouna Hannachi				Retired	
Ahlem Hattab				(Tunisia) ASF Sousse	
Zina Hidouri				Retired	
**Mariem Houij**				(Turkey) Ataşehir Belediyespor	
**Sawssen Ismail**				(Tunisia) ASF Sahel	
**Aya Jeddi**				(Tunisia) ASF Sousse	
**Yasmine Jemai**				(Tunisia) ASF Sahel	
**Salima Jobrani**				(Tunisia) ASF Sousse	
**Ella Kaabachi**				(France) Soyaux	
**Chaima Khammar**				(United States) UMass Lowell River Hawks	
**Marwa Khmiri**				(Tunisia) ASF Sahel	
**Yasmine Klai**				(France) Lyon Youth	
Soumaya Laamiri					
**Chirine Lamti**				(Czech Republic) Slavia Prague	
**Dhekra Mahfoudh**				(Tunisia) ASF Sbiba	
**Leïla Maknoun**				(France) OSNY FC	
**Sabrine Mamay**				(United Arab Emirates) Al Ain Ladies Club	
**Imen Mchara**				(Tunisia) ASF Sousse	
**Wafe Messaoud**				(Tunisia) ASF Gafsa	
Fatma Mlayeh				Retired	
Imen Mrad					
Soumaya Ouerghi				Retired	
Racha Riabi					
**Meriem Sassi**				(Tunisia) AS Banque de l'habitat	
**Marwa Tbini**				(Tunisia) ASF Sahel	
**Imen Troudi**				(United Arab Emirates) Abu Dhabi Country Club	
**Sana Yaakoubi**				(Tunisia) AS Banque de l'habitat	
Nada Zanina				Retired	
Mehrzia Zouaoui				Retired	

== See also ==
- Tunisia women's national football team
