= Le Kram =

- Commune and town
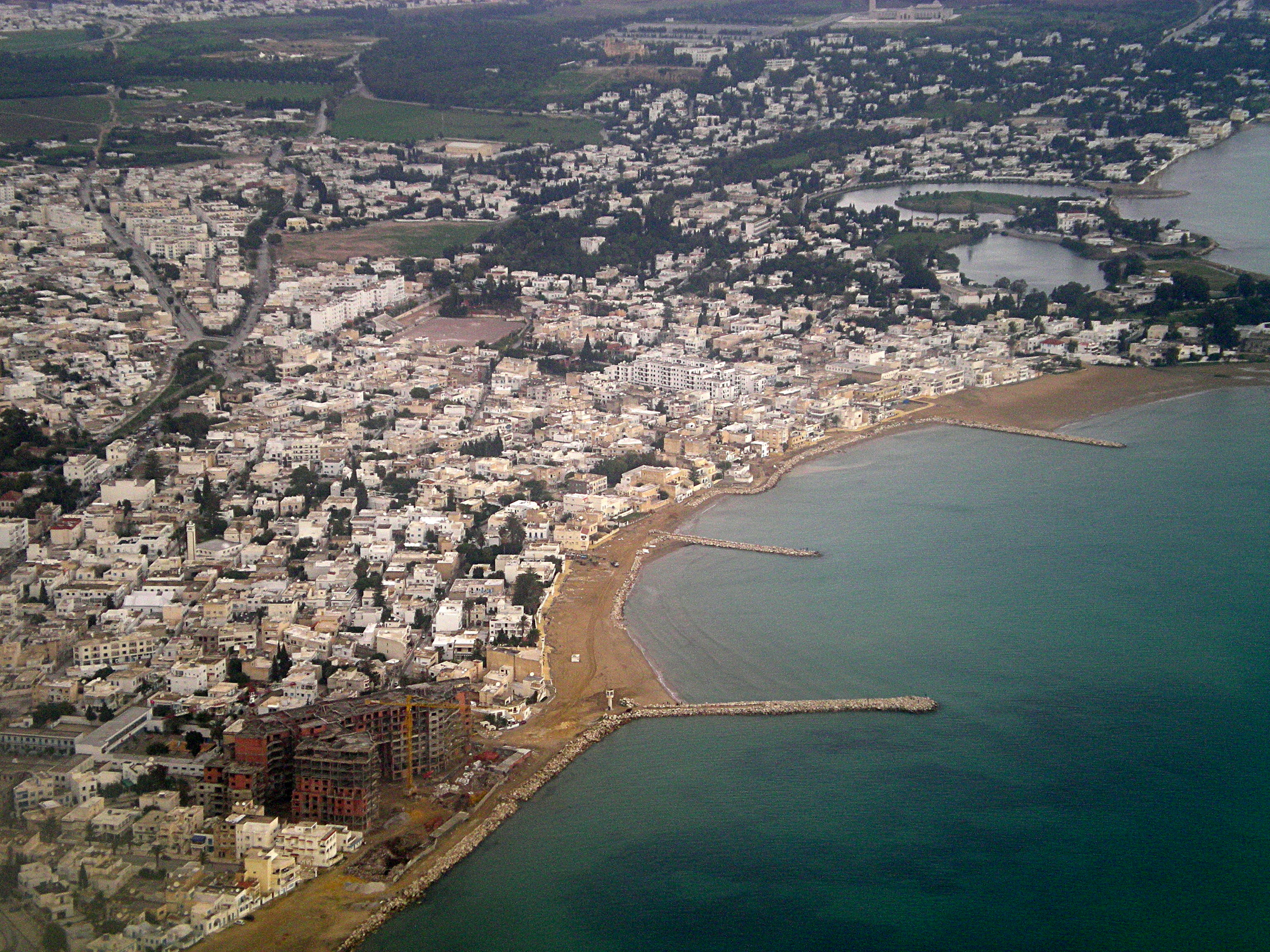
- View of the Punic ports of Carthage near Le Kram

- Location within Tunisia
- Country: Tunisia
- Governorate: Tunis Governorate
- Delegation(s): Le Kram

Government
  - Mayor: Fathi Laâyouni (Ennahdha)

Area
  - Total: 9.63 km^{2} (3.72 sq mi)
- Elevation: 10 m (33 ft)

Population (2024)
  - Total: 88,302
  - Density: 9,171/km^{2} (23,750/sq mi)
- Time zone: UTC+1 (CET)
- Postal code: 2015
- Website: www.commune-kram.gov.tn

Le Kram is a town and commune in the Tunis Governorate of Tunisia. It is situated between La Goulette, the port of Tunis, and Carthage, facing the Gulf of Tunis to the east and the Lake of Tunis to the west. As of the 2024 census, it had a population of 88,302. Prior to 2001, Le Kram was a municipal district within the neighbouring municipality of La Goulette.

The area's original name was Aga El Kram, later Gallicised to Le Kram. In Tunisian Arabic, kram refers to a fig tree or fruit tree in general. According to historian Mohamed El Aziz Ben Achour:

Mustapha Aga [...] lived peacefully in his palace in the Carthage area, in the midst of an extensive orchard of fig trees, the source of the name of the village that was later established in this location...

The orchard was granted by Ahmad I ibn Mustafa, Bey of Tunis under Ottoman suzerainty, to Mustapha Aga, who served as Minister of War in the Kingdom of Tunis from 1837 to 1855.

During the French protectorate of Tunisia, Le Kram attracted a significant European population. Many built seaside homes along the coast, ranging from modest houses to luxurious villas. Most of these structures have since been replaced by military training centres and the residential area of Kram-Salammbô, though some gardens from the original properties remain. The oldest houses followed traditional Tunisian styles, while larger bourgeois residences often adopted Italian architectural influences. An example is La Carmencita, a small villa on Sakiet Sidi Youssef Street (formerly Rue Jules Ferry).

The town's modern development was greatly influenced by the opening of the Tunis-Goulette-Marsa (TGM) railway line, which linked the Khereddine and La Goulette–Carthage–Salammbô branches.

The Salammbô district contains several significant historical sites, including the remains of the Punic port of Carthage, the Tophet (sacred precinct of the ancient Carthaginians), and the facilities of the National Institute of Marine Sciences and Technologies (INSTM) and its associated Oceanography Museum.

== See also ==
- List of cities in Tunisia
