= L'Amitié Stadium =

Sports stadium in Cotonou, Benin

Coordinates: 6°23′9.6″N 2°22′45.6″E

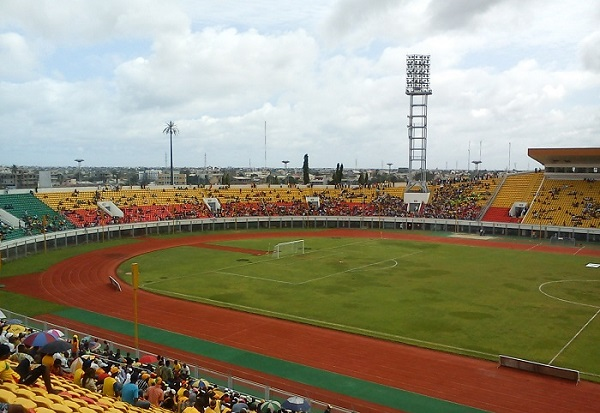
Stade de l'Amitié

L'Amitié Stadium or Friendship Stadium is a multi-purpose stadium in Cotonou, Benin. It is currently used for football matches and also has facilities for athletics. The stadium has a capacity of 35,000 people.

The stadium is home to Benin's national football team.
