= Tunisia women's national football team =

Women's national association football team representing Tunisia

Tunisia
- Nickname(s): نسور قرطاج (Eagles of Carthage)
- Association: Tunisian Football Federation
- Other affiliation: UAFA (Arab World)
- Confederation: CAF (Africa)
- Sub-confederation: UNAF (North Africa)
- Head coach: Walid Garroum
- Captain: Chaima Abbassi
- Top scorer: Mariem Houij (21)
- Home stadium: Hammadi Agrebi Stadium
- FIFA code: TUN
First colours	Second colours	Third colours

FIFA ranking
- Current: 102 ▼2 (16 June 2026)
- Highest: 67 (March 2017)
- Lowest: 100 (april 2026)

First international
- Egypt 2–1 Tunisia (Alexandria, Egypt; 20 April 2006)

Biggest win
- Tunisia 16–0 Libya (Berrechid, Morocco; 26 October 2025)

Biggest defeat
- Tunisia 0–5 Tanzania (Tunis, Tunisia; 11 July 2024)

Women's Africa Cup of Nations
- Appearances: 3 (first in 2008)
- Best result: Quarter-finals (2022)

Arab Women's Cup
- Appearances: 2 (first in 2006)
- Best result: Runners-up (2021)

UNAF Women's Tournament
- Appearances: 2 (first in 2009)
- Best result: Champions (2009)
Medal record
Arab Women's Cup
Bronze medal – third place	2006 Egypt
Silver medal – second place	2021 Egypt	Team

The Tunisia women's national football team represents Tunisia in women's international association football. The team is administered by the Tunisian Football Federation (TFF), which governs football in Tunisia. On a continental level, the team competes under the Confederation of African Football (CAF), which governs associate football in Africa, and is also affiliated with FIFA for global competitions. Additionally, the team is a member of the Union of North African Football (UNAF) and the Union of Arab Football Associations (UAFA). The team is colloquially known as Eagles of Carthage by fans and the media, with the bald eagle serving as its symbol. Their home kit is primarily white and their away kit is red, which is a reference to the national flag. Walid Garroum is the current head coach.

Tunisia has never qualified for the FIFA Women's World Cup or Summer Olympics and its participation in the Women's Africa Cup of Nations is sporadic, having only qualified for three editions. Tunisia qualified for the 2008 African Women's Championship, its first participation in a major tournament. However, the team was eliminated from the group stage after two defeats and a draw. The team returned to the competition after a 14-year absence, this time in the 2022 edition in Morocco. The team's performance did not rise to a high level, as it advanced to the quarter-finals in third place in its group after a win and two defeats, and was then eliminated by South Africa, the champion of that edition. Tunisia qualified for the 2024 Women's Africa Cup of Nations and was eliminated from the group stage. Tunisia has also participated in two editions of the Arab Women's Cup, the team finished third in 2006 and reached the final of the 2021 edition, but lost to Jordan to finish second.

== History ==
Women's football in Tunisia is now multiplying efforts to assert its national and international reputation. Nevertheless, the road may be long. The beginning of women's football in Tunisia during the 2000s, women's football remained non-existent in Tunisia. Women's football has suffered from an overall neglect, at least partly resulting from a culture rooted in and focused mainly on male football. Moreover, women have fallen behind in the field. The Tunisian Women's Championship and Tunisian Women's Cup started in the 2004–05 season. It is a national football competition organized every year. This competition opposes the best women's football clubs in Tunisia. Tunisian women's football on the international level despite the national competitions, Tunisia remains absent from international confrontations. FIFA has also qualified Tunisia as inactive since 2016.

Yet, the Tunisian federation has committed to the establishment of a large women's national team. This initiative aims to create a female model of Tunisian football at the international level and to change the finding of FIFA. This organization, advised by Tarek Bouchamaoui, will be able to see the skills of women's football. Moreover, Bouchamaoui, a member of the FIFA Council, wishes an improvement of all the teams in Africa, including the women's teams.

The Tunisian team qualified for second time to 2022 Women's Africa Cup of Nations after a victory against Equatorial Guinea. In their first match against Togo, Tunisia recorded their first win ever in the WAFCON 4–1. Even with two defeats against Zambia 1–0 and Cameroon 2–0, the team was still able to qualify to the quarter-finals for the first time ever as one of the third ranked teams. Against South Africa, Tunisia lost 1–0. The Tunisians still had another chance with a Repechage match against Senegal to enter the inter-confederation play-offs, yet another lacklustre performance saw Tunisia's dream crashed out, losing 2–4 on penalties.

On 26 October 2025, during the first match of the Friendly FIFA Unites Women's Series, Tunisia achieved their biggest victory in the team's history after defeating Libya 16–0.

== Coaching staff ==
=== Current coaching staff ===
Role	Name
Head coach	(Tunisia) Walid Garroum

=== Coaching history ===
- (Tunisia) Samir Landolsi (2006–2008)
- (Tunisia) Mohamed Ali Hami (2008–2012)
- (Tunisia) Samir Landolsi (2012–2014)
- (Tunisia) Mourad Bacha (2014–2016)
- (Tunisia) Samir Landolsi (2016–2018)
- (Tunisia) Samir Landolsi (2021–2024)
- (Tunisia) Kamel Saada (2024–2025)
- (Tunisia) Haykel Guemamdia (2025)
- (Tunisia) Walid Garroum (2026–present)

== Results and fixtures ==
The following is a list of match results in the last 12 months, as well as any future matches that have been scheduled.

Legend

Win Draw Lose Fixture

=== 2025 ===
21 February 2026 WAFCON qualifying	Kenya	0–0	Tunisia	Nairobi, Kenya
15:00 UTC+3		Report		Stadium: Ulinzi Sports Complex

26 February 2026 WAFCON qualifying	Tunisia	0–1	Kenya	Sousse, Tunisia
14:00 UTC+1		Report	Engesha 4'	Stadium: Sousse Olympic Stadium; Referee: Vincentia Amedome (Togo)

4 April Friendly	Morocco	3–1	Tunisia	Casablanca, Morocco
18:00 UTC+0	Mrabet 39'; Jraïdi 50'; I. El Ghazouani 54'	Report	Shaiek 48'	Stadium: Père Jégo Stadium; Referee: Natacha Konan Akissi (Ivory Coast)

8 April Friendly	Morocco B	2–4	Tunisia	Salé, Morocco
12:00 UTC+0	Bouftini 14'; El Madani 80'	Report	Khanchouch 2'; Zemzem 5'; Houij 72'; Ellouzi 75'	Stadium: Complexe Mohammed VI de football

6 July 2024 WAFCON GS	Nigeria	3−0	Tunisia	Casablanca, Morocco
17:00 UTC+1	Oshoala 4'; Babajide 45+1'; Ihezuo 84'	Report		Stadium: Larbi Zaouli Stadium; Referee: Suavis Iratunga (Burundi)

10 July 2024 WAFCON GS	Tunisia	0−0	Algeria	Casablanca, Morocco
17:00 UTC+1		Report		Stadium: Père Jégo Stadium; Referee: Akhona Makalima (South Africa)

13 July 2024 WAFCON GS	Tunisia	1−2	Botswana	Casablanca, Morocco
20:00 UTC+0	Khanchouch 12'	Report	Radiakanyo 66'; Ontlametse 90+5'	Stadium: Père Jégo Stadium; Referee: Aline Guimbang Etong (Cameroon)

26 October FIFA Unites Women's Series	Tunisia	16–0	Libya	Berrechid, Morocco
20:00 UTC+1	Mejri 5', 53'; Zerelli 13', 43'; Ammar 22', 39', 49'; Abbassi 24', 47'; Ben Kaabia 63', 73', 75', 88'; Nouhaili 66'; Lamti 78'; Khemili 85'	Report		Stadium: Berrechid Municipal Stadium; Referee: Haneen Murad (Jordan)

29 October FIFA Unites Women's Series	Tunisia	4–0	(Afghanistan) Afghan Women United	Berrechid, Morocco
17:00 UTC+1	Marzouki 7'; Mejri 11'; Abbassi 67'; Ammar 74'	Report		Stadium: Berrechid Municipal Stadium

1 November FIFA Unites Women's Series	Chad	1–0	Tunisia	Berrechid, Morocco
20:00 UTC+1	Larkingam 29'	Report		Stadium: Berrechid Municipal Stadium; Referee: Haneen Murad (Jordan)

=== 2026 ===
12 April Friendly	Tunisia	1–0	Benin	Manouba, Tunisia
14:00	Houij 89'			Stadium: Manouba Sports Complex

16 April Friendly	Tunisia	2–1	Comoros	Manouba, Tunisia
14:00	Nouhaili 3'; Abbassi 77'		Dahmani 5'	Stadium: Manouba Sports Complex; Referee: Sirine Abdelmalek (Tunisia)

5 June 2026 Friendly	Egypt	1–1 (4–2 p)	Tunisia	Cairo, Egypt
19:00 UTC+2	Khalifa 17'	Report	Houij 90'	Stadium: EFA Center; Referee: Shahenda El Maghrabi (Egypt)
	Penalties
	Ghazi (penalty scored); Khaled (penalty scored); Salama (penalty scored); Nadda (penalty scored)		(penalty missed) Houij; (penalty missed) Zemzem; (penalty scored) Guermazi; (penalty scored) Ouni

8 June 2026 Friendly	Tunisia	2–2 (6–7 p)	Egypt	Cairo, Egypt
19:00 UTC+2	Zemzem 5'; Guermazi 64'		tbc 60'; tbc 87'

8 October 2026 2028 Olympic Qualification Second round	Tunisia	0–1	Senegal	Radès
19:00 UTC+1		Report	Casset 63'	Stadium: Hammadi Agrebi Stadium; Referee: Chancelle Ngakosso (Congo)

13 October 2026 2028 Olympic Qualification Second round	Senegal	2–0 (3-0 agg.)	Tunisia	Dakar
17:00 UTC+0	N. Ndiaye 13', 27'			Stadium: Leopold Sédar Senghor Stadium; Referee: https://globalsportsarchive.com/en/soccer/match/2026-10-13/senegal-vs-tunisia/4549289
Note: Senegal won 3-0 on aggregate.

== Players ==
No.	Pos.	Player	Date of birth (age)	Club
	GK	Tasnime Barhoumi	12 June 2007 (aged 19)	(French Football Federation) AS Cannes
	GK	Manelle Ben Mohamed	2 August 2003 (aged 23)	(Monégasque Football Federation) AS Monaco
	GK	Soulaima Jabrani	25 February 1997 (aged 29)	(Tunisian Football Federation) ASF Sousse
	DF	Norhène Bettoumi	2 October 2005 (aged 21)	(Monégasque Football Federation) AS Monaco
	DF	Yesmine Khanchouch	18 February 2006 (aged 20)	(Royal Dutch Football Association) HERA United
	DF	Nora Nouhaili	15 February 2003 (aged 23)	(Royal Moroccan Football Federation) Wydad AC
	DF	Rania Aouini		(Saudi Arabian Football Federation) Al Hijaz SC
	DF	Ghada Ayadi	10 August 1992 (aged 34)	(Saudi Arabian Football Federation) Al Hijaz SC
	DF	Chaima Abbassi (Captain)	4 June 1993 (aged 33)	(Saudi Arabian Football Federation) NEOM
	DF	Samia Ouni	30 May 1992 (aged 34)	(Saudi Arabian Football Federation) Eagle United FC
	DF	Meriem Barhoumi		(Tunisian Football Federation) AS Banque de l'Habitat
	MF	Sana Guermazi	3 November 2001 (aged 24)	(French Football Federation) Le Mans FC
	MF	Yosra Ben Hadj Mahmoud	9 March 2001 (aged 25)	(French Football Federation) Grenoble Foot 38
	MF	Sonia Ameri		(French Football Federation) Montauban
	MF	Sarah Ben M'Barek		(French Football Federation) FC Sochaux-Montbéliard
	MF	Yasmine Klai	15 September 2002 (aged 24)	(Italian Football Federation) US Salernitana 1919
	MF	Hiba Hidri		(Tunisian Football Federation) ASF Sousse
	MF	Selma Marzouki	22 June 2006 (aged 20)	(Tunisian Football Federation) AS Banque de l'Habitat
	FW	Salma Zemzem	7 April 2000 (aged 26)	(French Football Federation) FC Metz
	FW	Yasmine Ben Kaabia	1 February 2007 (aged 19)	(French Football Federation) En Avant Guingamp
	FW	Sabrine Ellouzi	28 June 1998 (aged 28)	(Royal Dutch Football Association) AZ Alkmaar
	FW	Mariem Houij	8 August 1994 (aged 32)	(Turkish Football Federation) Ünye Gücü FK
	FW	Ines Zaghdoudi		(German Football Association) ETV Hamburg
	FW	Ahlem Ammar	22 June 2004 (aged 22)	(United States Soccer Federation) Tyler Junior College

=== Recent call-ups ===
The following players have also been called up to the Tunisia squad within the last 12 months.

Pos.	Player	Date of birth (age)	Caps	Goals	Club	Latest call-up
GK	Zahra Jelassi	11 April 2000 (aged 26)	-	-	(Morocco) Phoenix Marrakech	v. Chad, 1 November 2025
DF	Yassmine Khemili	18 December 2006 (age 19)	-	-	(Tunisia) AS Banque de l'Habitat	v. Chad, 1 November 2025
DF	Nadine Abdaoui		-	-	(Tunisia) ASF Sousse	v. Chad, 1 November 2025
DF	Arij Romhdhani	15 February 2006 (age 20)	-	-	(Tunisia) ASF Bou Hajla	v. Chad, 1 November 2025
DF	Anna Oueslati	{{{age}}}	-	-	(France) Pernes Fontaine	v. Egypt, 8 June 2026
DF	Sanah Ben Mohamed	{{{age}}}	-	-	(Switzerland) Étoile Carouge	v. Egypt, 8 June 2026
MF	Bérénice Bahloul-Machado	7 April 2005 (age 21)	-	-	(France) FC Lyon	v. Chad, 1 November 2025
MF	Chirine Lamti	13 September 1994 (aged 31)	-	-	(Italy) Venezia FC	v. Chad, 1 November 2025
MF	Chaima Ben Mohamed	11 September 1997 (age 29)	-	-	(Saudi Arabia) Phoenix Saudi Club	v. Chad, 1 November 2025
FW	Tesnim Zerelli	2 March 2006 (age 20)	-	-	(France) FC Fleury 91	v. Chad, 1 November 2025
FW	Yasmine Khalfallah	1 May 2006 (age 20)	-	-	(Tunisia) ASF Sousse	v. Chad, 1 November 2025
FW	Anna Latifa Uebing	{{{age}}}	-	-	(Germany) VfL Bochum	v. Egypt, 8 June 2026
FW	Amani Mahmoud	{{{age}}}	-	-	(Germany) 1. FFC Turbine Potsdam	v. Egypt, 8 June 2026
FW	Myriam Bayahia	{{{age}}}	-	-	(France) AJ Auxerre	v. Egypt, 8 June 2026
^{INJ} Player withdrew from the squad due to an injury.^{PRE} Preliminary squad.^{SUS} Player is serving a suspension.^{WD} Player withdrew for personal reasons.

=== Previous squads ===
Africa Women Cup of Nations

- 2022 Africa Women Cup of Nations squads
- 2024 Africa Women Cup of Nations squads

UNAF Women's Tournament

- 2020 UNAF Women's Tournament squad

Arab Women's Cup

- 2021 Arab Women's Cup squad

== Records ==
*Active players in bold, statistics correct as of 12 June 2025.

=== Most capped players ===
#	Player	Year(s)	Caps
**1**	Chaima Abbassi	2011–present	52
**2**	Mariem Houij	2011–present	45
**3**	Ella Kaabachi	2013–present	39
**4**	Sabrine Ellouzi	2020–present	28
**5**	Rania Aouina	2015–present	25

=== Top goalscorers ===
#	Player	Year(s)	Goals	Caps
1	Mariem Houij	2011–present	21	45
2	Sabrine Ellouzi	2020–present	16	28
3	Ella Kaabachi	2013–present	11	39
4	Nassima Abidi	2006–20??	8	??
5	Imen Mchara	2015–present	6	??
6	Fatma Mlayeh	2009–2011	5	??
7	Sabrine Mamay	2008–present	4	??

== Competitive records ==
Champions Runners-up Third place Fourth place

- Red border color indicates tournament was held on home soil.

=== FIFA Women's World Cup ===
FIFA Women's World Cup record									FIFA Women's World Cup qualification record					
Year	Round	Position	Pld	W	D*	L	GF	GA	Pld	W	D*	L	GF	GA
(China) 1991	Did not enter								Did not enter					
(Sweden) 1995	Did not enter								Did not enter					
(United States) 1999	Did not enter								Did not enter					
(United States) 2003	Did not enter								Did not enter					
(China) 2007	Did not enter								Did not enter					
(Germany) 2011	Did not qualify								2	0	1	1	1	2
(Canada) 2015	Did not qualify								4	1	1	2	8	7
(France) 2019	Did not enter								Did not enter					
(Australia) (New Zealand) 2023	Did not qualify								9	4	1	4	18	10
(Brazil) 2027	Did not qualify								2	0	1	1	0	1
(Costa Rica) (Jamaica) (Mexico) (United States) 2031	To be determined								To be determined					
(United Kingdom) 2035	To be determined								To be determined					
Total	–	0/12	–	–	–	–	–	–	17	5	4	8	27	20

=== Summer Olympics ===
Summer Olympics record									Summer Olympics qualification record					
Year	Round	Position	Pld	W	D*	L	GF	GA	Pld	W	D*	L	GF	GA
(United States) 1996	Did not enter								Did not enter					
(Australia) 2000	Did not enter								Did not enter					
(Greece) 2004	Did not enter								Did not enter					
(China) 2008	Did not enter								Did not enter					
(United Kingdom) 2012	Did not qualify								4	1	0	3	4	2
(Brazil) 2016	Did not qualify								2	0	0	2	0	6
(Japan) 2021	Did not enter								Did not enter					
(France) 2024	Did not qualify								2	0	0	2	2	6
(United States) 2028	Did not qualify								2	0	0	2	0	3
Total	–	0/10	–	–	–	–	–	–	10	1	0	9	6	17

=== Women's Africa Cup of Nations ===
Women's Africa Cup of Nations record									Women's Africa Cup of Nations qualification record					
Year	Round	Position	Pld	W	D*	L	GF	GA	Pld	W	D*	L	GF	GA
1991	Did not enter								Did not enter					
1995	Did not enter								Did not enter					
(Nigeria) 1998	Did not enter								Did not enter					
(South Africa) 2000	Did not enter								Did not enter					
(Nigeria) 2002	Did not enter								Did not enter					
(South Africa) 2004	Did not enter								Did not enter					
(Nigeria) 2006	Did not enter								Did not enter					
(Equatorial Guinea) 2008	Group stage	7th	3	0	1	2	3	5	4	3	1	0	8	1
(South Africa) 2010	Did not qualify								2	0	1	1	1	2
(Equatorial Guinea) 2012	Did not qualify								2	0	0	2	2	2
(Namibia) 2014	Did not qualify								4	2	0	2	8	7
(Cameroon) 2016	Did not qualify								4	1	1	2	3	6
(Ghana) 2018	Did not enter								Did not enter					
2020	Did not enter; tournament was later cancelled								Did not enter; tournament was later cancelled					
(Morocco) 2022	Quarter-finals	7th	5	1	1	3	4	5	4	3	0	1	14	5
(Morocco) 2024	Group stage	11th	3	0	1	2	1	5	4	3	1	0	18	4
(Morocco) 2026	Did not qualify								2	0	1	1	0	1
Total	Quarter-finals	3/14	11	1	3	7	8	15	26	12	5	9	54	28

=== Arab Women's Cup ===
Arab Women's Cup record
Year	Round	Position	Pld	W	D*	L	GF	GA
(Egypt) 2006	Third place	3rd	5	3	0	2	17	6
(Egypt) 2021	Runner-up	2nd	5	1	3	1	16	6
(Morocco) 2027	To be determined							
Total	Runner-up	2/2	10	4	3	3	33	12

=== UNAF Women's Tournament ===
UNAF Women's Tournament record
Year	Round	Position	Pld	W	D*	L	GF	GA
(Tunisia) 2009	**Champions**	1st	2	2	0	0	7	2
(Tunisia) 2020	Third place	3rd	4	1	2	1	5	3
(Egypt) 2021	Did not enter; tournament was later cancelled							
Total	1 Title	2/3	6	3	2	1	12	5

== Honours ==
=== Regional ===
- **Arab Women's Cup**

(silver) Runners-up (1): 2021
(bronze) Third Place (1): 2006

- **UNAF Women's Tournament**

(gold) Champions (1): 2009
(bronze) Third Place (1): 2020

=== Friendly ===
- **Menton Tournament**

(gold) Champions (3): 2010, 2013, 2014
(silver) Runners-up (1): 2009

- **FIFA Unites Women's Series**

(silver) Runners-up (1): 2025

== See also ==
- Tunisian Football Federation
- Tunisia women's national under-20 football team
- Tunisia women's national under-17 football team
