= Ivory Coast women's national football team results =

This article lists the results and fixtures for the Ivory Coast women's national football team.

Nicknamed "Les Éléphantes" or "Les Éléphants Dames," a designation derived from the men's national team "Les Éléphants," the Ivory Coast women's national football team represents the country in international women's association football. The team is governed by the Ivorian Football Federation and competes under the Confederation of African Football (CAF), as well as in regional competitions organized by the West African Football Union (WAFU), and global tournaments sanctioned by FIFA.

Established in the late 1980s, the team made history as the first African women's national team to participate in an international match when they competed in the 1988 FIFA Women's Invitation Tournament. Their debut took place on 1 June 1988 against the Netherlands, ending in a 3–0 defeat. The team went on to lose its next two matches, scoring just one goal and conceding 17. Ivory Coast recorded its first official victory 19 years later, defeating Senegal 2–0 in the qualification round for the 2008 African Women's Championship. Their largest official win came in 2021 with an emphatic 11–0 triumph over Niger. Conversely, their heaviest defeat occurred in 2015 when they lost 10–0 to Germany.

== Record per opponent ==
As of match played on 4 August 2026 against Tanzania
Key

Positive balance (more wins than losses)
Neutral balance (as many wins as losses)
Negative balance (more losses than wins)

The following table shows Ivory Coast's all-time official international record per opponent:

Opponent	Pld	W	D	L	GF	GA	GD	PPG	Confederation	Last
Algeria	4	4	0	0	10	3	+7	3.00	CAF	2018
Benin	3	1	2	0	4	3	+1	2.67	CAF	2026
Burkina Faso	2	1	1	0	5	2	+3	2.00	CAF	2026
Cameroon	5	0	1	4	5	11	−6	0.20	CAF	2019
Cape Verde	2	1	1	0	3	0	+3	2.00	CAF	2026
Canada	1	0	0	1	0	6	−6	0.00	CONCACAF	1988
China	1	0	0	1	1	8	−7	0.00	AFC	1988
Congo	1	1	0	0	1	0	+1	3.00	CAF	2015
Egypt	2	1	0	1	2	2	±0	1.50	CAF	2016
Equatorial Guinea	2	0	2	0	3	3	±0	1.00	CAF	2014
Ethiopia	1	1	0	0	5	0	+5	3.00	CAF	2012
Gabon	2	2	0	0	5	2	+3	3.00	CAF	2010
Germany	1	0	0	1	0	10	−10	0.00	UEFA	2015
Ghana	9	2	3	4	6	10	−4	1.00	CAF	2026
Guinea	2	2	0	0	10	1	+9	3.00	CAF	2012
Kenya	3	3	0	0	5	0	+5	3.00	CAF	2026
Mali	14	6	6	2	22	16	+6	1.71	CAF	2026
Mauritania	1	1	0	0	8	0	+8	3.00	CAF	2026
Morocco	3	0	3	0	1	1	±0	1.00	CAF	2022
Mozambique	2	2	0	0	12	0	+12	3.00	CAF	2012
Namibia	1	1	0	0	3	1	+2	3.00	CAF	2014
Netherlands	1	0	0	1	0	3	−3	0.00	UEFA	1988
Niger	3	3	0	0	27	0	+27	3.00	CAF	2021
Nigeria	11	2	3	6	11	19	−8	0.82	CAF	2022
Norway	1	0	0	1	1	3	−2	0.00	UEFA	2015
Pakistan	1	1	0	0	2	0	+2	3.00	AFC	2026
Senegal	8	4	4	0	18	5	+13	2.00	CAF	2025
South Africa	3	1	1	1	4	4	±0	1.33	CAF	2026
Tanzania	4	3	0	1	5	3	+2	2.25	CAF	2026
Thailand	1	0	0	1	2	3	−1	0.00	AFC	2015
Togo	1	1	0	0	5	0	+5	3.00	CAF	2019
Turks and Caicos Islands	1	1	0	0	15	1	+14	3.00	CONCACAF	2026
Zambia	1	0	1	0	1	1	±0	1.00	CAF	2014
Total	98	45	28	25	202	121	+81	1.66	—	

== Results ==
This section provides a detailed account of the Ivory Coast women's national team's historical results in matches against national teams under FIFA membership.

=== 1988 ===
1 June 1988 FIFA Invitation Tournament GS	Netherlands	3–0	Ivory Coast	Foshan, China
	Regina Miltenburg 1'; Ria Vestjens 2' (pen.); Daniëlle de Winter 46'	Report		Stadium: New Plaza Stadium

3 June 1988 FIFA Invitation Tournament GS	Canada	6–0	Ivory Coast	Foshan, China
11:45 GMT	Annie Caron 12', 20'; Fabienne Gareau 25'; Cathy Ross 35'; Joan McEachern 60'; Connie Cant 70'	Report		Stadium: New Plaza Stadium; Attendance: 9,750

6 June 1988 FIFA Invitation Tournament GS	China	8–1	Ivory Coast	Guangzhou, China
				Stadium: Tianhe Stadium

=== 1992 ===
17 April 1992 Lyon'ne Cup	United States U20	4–0	Ivory Coast	Lyon, France

18 April 1992 Lyon'ne Cup	CIS	3–0	Ivory Coast	Lyon, France

19 April 1992 Lyon'ne Cup	France	6–1	Ivory Coast	Lyon, France

=== 2002 ===
10 August 2002 African Championship qualification	Ivory Coast	3–3	Mali	Abidjan
	Rachel Bancouly 27', 71'; Adélaïde Koudougnon 48'	Report	Maichata Konaté 7', 45'; Diaty N'Diaye 74'	Referee: Fatou Gaye (Senegal)

24 August 2002 African Championship qualification	Mali	1–1	Ivory Coast	Bamako, Mali
	Diaty N'Diaye 59'	Report	Rachel Bancouly 35'	Referee: Abidoye Bola (Nigeria)

=== 2005 ===
18 May 2005 Solidarity Tournament	Mali	6–1	Ivory Coast	Dakar, Senegal
		Report		Stadium: Stade Iba Mar Diop

20 May 2005 Solidarity Tournament	Senegal	3–3	Ivory Coast	Dakar, Senegal
17:00 GMT		Report		Stadium: Stade Iba Mar Diop

=== 2006 ===
12 March 2006 African Championship qualification	Benin	1–1	Ivory Coast	Benin

25 March 2006 African Championship qualification	Ivory Coast	1–1 (a.e.t.) (3–4 p)	Benin	Abidjan

=== 2007 ===
2 September 2007 Five Nations Tournament	Ivory Coast	1–1	Mali	Ouagadougou, Burkina Faso
	Rita Akaffou 65'	Report	Fatoumata Diarra 54'	Stadium: Stade du 4 Août

4 September 2007 Five Nations Tournament	Ivory Coast	5–0 (Note: Côte d'Ivoire defeated Togo 5–0 in a match originally played as a senior international. However, Togo were later disqualified from the tournament after it was found they had fielded a club team (MBA Lomé) instead of a national team, in violation of tournament regulations.)	MBA Lomé	Ouagadougou, Burkina Faso
		Report		Stadium: Stade du 4 Août

6 September 2007 Five Nations Tournament	Mali	2–1	Ivory Coast	Ouagadougou, Burkina Faso
16:00 GMT		Report		Stadium: Stade du 4 Août

1 December 2008 African Championship qualification	Senegal	1–1	Ivory Coast	Dakar, Senegal
16:00 GMT	Séréna Léna Gomis 20'	Report	Ange Atsé Chiépo 36'	Stadium: Stade Iba Mar Diop; Referee: Mercy Tagoe (Ghana)

16 December 2008 African Championship qualification	Ivory Coast	2–0	Senegal	Abidjan
	Binta Diakité 16'; Ange Atsé Chiépo 89'	Report		Stadium: Robert Champroux Stadium

=== 2008 ===
23 February 2008 African Championship qualification	Ivory Coast	1–1	Ghana	Abidjan
	Nadege Essoh 82'	Report	Gloria Oforiwaa 10'	Stadium: Robert Champroux Stadium; Referee: Thérèse Sagno (Guinea)

8 March 2008 African Championship qualification	Ghana	3–0	Ivory Coast	Accra, Ghana
	Ama Saabi 23'; Anita Amankwa 60'; Florence Okoe 85'	Report		Stadium: Ohene Djan Stadium

=== 2010 ===
7 March 2010 African Championship qualification	Gabon	1–2	Ivory Coast	Libreville, Gabon
	Gladys Ntsame 27'	Report	Rachel Bancouly 7'; Binta Diakité 90+1'	Stadium: Stade Augustin Monédan de Sibang; Referee: Felicia Chibuogu (Nigeria)

19 March 2010 African Championship qualification	Ivory Coast	3–1	Gabon	Abidjan
15:30 GMT	Rachel Bancouly 3', 31', 46'	Report	Winie Mapangou 8'	Stadium: Felix Houphouet Boigny Stadium; Referee: Kankou Coulibaly (Mali)

23 May 2010 African Championship qualification	Ivory Coast	1–2	Nigeria	Abidjan
15:30 GMT	Ange N'Guessan 78'	Report	Perpetua Nkwocha 21'; Martina Ohadugha 45+1'	Stadium: Stade Robert Champroux; Referee: Aissata Amegee (Togo)

5 June 2010 African Championship qualification	Nigeria	3–1	Ivory Coast	Abuja, Nigeria
15:00 GMT	Rita Chikwelu 13'; Perpetua Nkwocha 72', 89'	Report	Binta Diakité 50'	Stadium: Abuja National Stadium; Referee: Patricia Obone Obiang (Gabon)

=== 2012 ===
14 January 2012 African Championship qualification	Ivory Coast	5–1	Guinea	Abidjan
	Jeanne Gnago 10', 72'; Josée Nahi 21', 55'; Ines Nrehy 35'	Report	Marra 40'	Stadium: Robert Champroux Stadium

29 January 2012 African Championship qualification	Guinea	0–5	Ivory Coast	Conakry, Guinea
16:30 GMT				Stadium: Stade du 28 Septembre

26 May 2012 African Championship qualification	Ivory Coast	7–0	Mozambique	Abidjan
				Stadium: Robert Champroux Stadium

16 June 2012 African Championship qualification	Mozambique	0–5	Ivory Coast	Maputo, Mozambique
			Binta Diakité 2'; Rita Akaffou 25'; Jeanne Gnago 29'; Josée Nahi 45+1'; Nadege Essoh 90+1'

12 October Friendly	Ivory Coast	6–0	Senegal	Abidjan
16:00 GMT				Stadium: Stade Robert Champroux

14 October Friendly	Ivory Coast	2–1	Senegal	Bingerville

29 October 2012 African Championship GS	Ivory Coast	5–0	Ethiopia	Bata, Equatorial Guinea
16:30 GMT	Ines Nrehy 1', 9', 68'; Jeanne Gnago 51'; Ange N'Guessan 53'	Report		Stadium: Nkoantoma Stadium; Referee: Kankou Coulibaly (Mali)

1 November 2012 African Championship GS	Cameroon	4–1	Ivory Coast	Bata, Equatorial Guinea
13:30 GMT	Adrienne Iven 11', 25'; Gabrielle Onguéné 62'; Francine Zouga 88'	Report	Josée Nahi 18'	Stadium: Nkoantoma Stadium; Referee: Neama Mohamed Rashad (Egypt)

4 November 2012 African Championship GS	Nigeria	3–1	Ivory Coast	Malabo, Equatorial Guinea
16:30 GMT	Ogonna Chukwudi 9'; Ngozi Ebere 39'; Stella Mbachu 75'	Report	Ines Nrehy 82'	Stadium: Estadio de Malabo; Referee: Insaf El Harkaoui (Morocco)

=== 2014 ===
15 February 2014 African Championship qualification	Ivory Coast	4–0	Mali	Abidjan
15:30 GMT	Jeanne Gnago 5' (pen.); Josée Nahi 72'; Ines Nrehy 80'; Rebecca Elloh 85'	Report		Stadium: Stade Robert Champroux; Referee: Monia Bedoui (Tunisia)

28 February 2014 African Championship qualification	Mali	0–1	Ivory Coast	Bamako, Mali
17:00 GMT		Report	Ines Nrehy 49'	Stadium: Stade Modibo Keïta; Referee: Leopoldina Ross (Guinea-Bissau)

30 April Friendly	Algeria	1–3	Ivory Coast	Algiers, Algeria
	Nachida Laïfa 69'	Report	Christine Lohoues 25'; Fatou Coulibaly 67' (pen.); Sandrine Niamien 87'	Stadium: Omar Hamadi Stadium

3 May Friendly	Algeria	1–2	Ivory Coast	Sidi Moussa, Algeria
		Report		Stadium: FAF National Technical Centre

23 May 2014 African Championship qualification	Ivory Coast	1–1	Equatorial Guinea	Abidjan
16:00 GMT	Mariam Diakité 37' (pen.)	Report	Genoveva Añonma 32'	Stadium: Stade Robert Champroux; Referee: Fadouma Dia (Senegal)

7 June 2014 African Championship qualification	Equatorial Guinea	2–2	Ivory Coast	Malabo, Equatorial Guinea
15:00 GMT	Jade Boho 3'; Dorine Chuigoué 89'	Report	Ida Guehai 35'; Ange N'Guessan 86'	Stadium: Estadio Internacional; Referee: Thérèse Neguel (Cameroon)

24 September Friendly	South Africa	2–1	Ivory Coast	Moruleng, South Africa
13:00 GMT	Portia Modise 43'; Sanah Mollo 52'	Report	Ines Nrehy 70'	Stadium: Moruleng Stadium

11 October 2014 African Championship GS	Nigeria	4–2	Ivory Coast	Windhoek, Namibia
18:00 GMT	Esther Sunday 11'; Mariam Diakité 54' (o.g.); Desire Oparanozie 74', 86'	Report	Fatou Coulibaly 21' (pen.); Christine Lohoues 75'	Stadium: Sam Nujoma Stadium; Referee: Maximina Bernado (Angola)

14 October 2014 African Championship GS	Ivory Coast	3–1	Namibia	Windhoek, Namibia
18:00 GMT	Josée Nahi 13'; Ines Nrehy 84', 90'	Report	Zenatha Coleman 20'	Stadium: Sam Nujoma Stadium; Referee: Damaris Kimani (Kenya)

17 October 2014 African Championship GS	Zambia	1–1	Ivory Coast	Windhoek, Namibia
15:00 GMT	Susan Banda 58'	Report	Josée Nahi 3'	Stadium: Independence Stadium; Referee: Bolokanang Lekgowe (Botswana)

22 October 2014 African Championship SF	Cameroon	2–1 (a.e.t.)	Ivory Coast	Windhoek, Namibia
18:00 GMT	Gaëlle Enganamouit 60'; Christine Manie 118'	Report	Ines Nrehy 65'	Stadium: Sam Nujoma Stadium; Referee: Lidya Tafesse (Ethiopia)

25 October 2014 African Championship 3rd	South Africa	0–1	Ivory Coast	Windhoek, Namibia
15:00 GMT		Report	Ida Guehai 84'	Stadium: Sam Nujoma Stadium; Referee: Lilia Abdeljaoued (Tunisia)

=== 2015 ===
10 May Friendly	Ivory Coast	2–3	Cameroon	Abidjan
	Ange N'Guessan 38'; Nadége Essoh 70'	Report	Henriette Akaba 14'; Genevieve Ngo Mbeleck 45'; Christine Manie 80'	Stadium: Stade Robert Champroux; Referee: Christine Ziga (Ghana)

7 June 2015 FIFA World Cup GS	Germany	10–0	Ivory Coast	Ottawa, Canada
20:00 GMT	Célia Šašić 3', 14', 31'; Anja Mittag 29', 35', 64'; Simone Laudehr 71'; Sara Däbritz 75'; Melanie Behringer 79'; Alexandra Popp 85'	Report		Stadium: TD Place Stadium; Attendance: 20,953; Referee: Carol Anne Chenard (Canada)

11 June 2015 FIFA World Cup GS	Ivory Coast	2–3	Thailand	Ottawa, Canada
23:00 GMT	Ange N'Guessan 4'; Josée Nahi 88'	Report	Orathai Srimanee 26', 45+3'; Thanatta Chawong 75'	Stadium: TD Place Stadium; Attendance: 18,987; Referee: Margaret Domka (United States)

15 June 2015 FIFA World Cup GS	Ivory Coast	1–3	Norway	Moncton, Canada
20:00 GMT	Ange N'Guessan 71'	Report	Ada Hegerberg 6', 62'; Solveig Gulbrandsen 67'	Stadium: Moncton Stadium; Attendance: 7,147; Referee: Salomé di Iorio (Argentina)

6 September 2015 African Games GS	Tanzania	0–1	Ivory Coast	Brazzaville, Republic of the Congo
16:00 GMT		Report	Sandrine Niamien 48'	Stadium: Stade Municipal de Kintélé; Referee: Fatou Thioune (Senegal)

9 September 2015 African Games GS	Ivory Coast	1–0	Congo	Brazzaville, Republic of the Congo
16:00 GMT	Rita Akaffou 38'	Report		Stadium: Stade Municipal de Kintélé; Referee: Maria Rivet (Mauritius)

12 September 2015 African Games GS	Nigeria	1–2	Ivory Coast	Brazzaville, Republic of the Congo
16:00 GMT	Mercy Amanze 10'	Report	Rebecca Elloh 45'; Josée Nahi 77' (pen.)	Stadium: Stade Alphonse Massemba-Débat; Referee: Christine Ziga (Ghana)

15 September 2015 African Games SF	Ivory Coast	0–1	Ghana	Brazzaville, Republic of the Congo
14:00 GMT		Report	Samira Suleman 15'	Stadium: Stade Municipal de Kintélé; Referee: Salima Mukansanga (Rwanda)

17 September 2015 African Games 3rd	Ivory Coast	2–1	Nigeria	Brazzaville, Republic of the Congo
17:00 GMT	Ange N'Guessan 70'; Fatou Coulibaly 77'	Report	Chinwendu Ihezuo 53'	Stadium: Stade Alphonse Massemba-Débat; Referee: Fatou Thioune (Senegal)

=== 2016 ===
7 April 2016 WAFCON qualification	Egypt	1–0	Ivory Coast	Cairo, Egypt
14:00 GMT	Yassmine Samir 45'	Report		Stadium: 30 June Stadium; Referee: Aissata Amegee (Togo)

11 April 2016 WAFCON qualification	Ivory Coast	2–1	Egypt	Abidjan
15:30 GMT	Rebecca Elloh 38'; Ines Nrehy 43'	Report	Neivin Gamal 86'	Stadium: Stade Robert Champroux; Referee: Jonesia Rukyaa Kabakama (Tanzania)

=== 2018 ===
14 February 2018 WAFU Zone B Cup GS	Ivory Coast	1–0	Ghana	Abidjan
15:30 GMT	Nina Kpaho 64'	Report		Stadium: Stade Robert Champroux

16 February 2018 WAFU Zone B Cup GS	Ivory Coast	1–1	Burkina Faso	Abidjan
18:00 GMT	Lynda Gauzé 51'	Report	Salimata Simporé 89' (pen.)	Stadium: Parc des sports de Treichville; Referee: Vincentia Amedome (Togo)

18 February 2018 WAFU Zone B Cup GS	Ivory Coast	7–0	Niger	Abidjan
15:00 GMT	Nina Kpaho 12'; Christine Lohoues 15'; Jessica Aby 58'; Ines Nrehy 59', 65', 90'; Nadége Essoh 67'	Report		Stadium: Robert Champroux Stadium; Referee: Teneba Bagayoko (Mali)

22 February 2018 WAFU Zone B Cup SF	Ivory Coast	2–0	Mali	Abidjan
16:30 GMT	Nina Kpaho 30', 33'	Report		Stadium: Parc des sports de Treichville

24 February 2018 WAFU Zone B Cup F	Ivory Coast	0–1	Ghana	Abidjan
19:00 GMT		Report	Janet Egyir 3'	Stadium: Robert Champroux Stadium; Referee: Vincentia Amedome (Togo)

6 April 2018 WAFCON qualification	Morocco	1–1	Ivory Coast	Rabat, Morocco
15:00 GMT	Ghizlane Chebbak 76'	Report	Fatou Coulibaly 52' (pen.)	Stadium: Moulay Hassan Stadium; Referee: Thérèse Neguel (Cameroon)

10 April 2018 WAFCON qualification	Ivory Coast	0–0	Morocco	Abidjan
15:00 GMT		Report		Stadium: Felix Houphouet Boigny Stadium; Referee: Gladys Lengwe (Zambia)

6 June 2018 WAFCON qualification	Ivory Coast	2–2	Mali	Abidjan
16:00 GMT	Rebecca Elloh 37' (pen.); Ange N'Guessan 90'	Report	Hawa Tangara 7'; Bassira Touré 47'	Stadium: Felix Houphouet Boigny Stadium; Referee: Aurore Ligan (Benin)

10 June 2018 WAFCON qualification	Mali	0–0	Ivory Coast	Bamako, Mali
16:30 GMT		Report		Stadium: Stade Mamadou Konaté; Referee: Bouchra Karboubi (Morocco)

9 November Friendly	Ivory Coast	2–1	Algeria	Abidjan
			Myriam Benlazar

11 November Friendly	Ivory Coast	3–0	Algeria	Abidjan

=== 2019 ===
8 May 2019 WAFU Zone B Cup GS	Ivory Coast	5–0	Togo	Abidjan
16:00 GMT	Rolande Tokpoledo 9' (pen.); Binta Diakité 26'; Espérance Agbo 33'; Ange N'Guessan 52'; Sandrine Kouadio 90+3'	Report		Stadium: Robert Champroux Stadium

10 May 2019 WAFU Zone B Cup GS	Ivory Coast	4–0	Senegal	Abidjan
18:30 GMT	Ange N'Guessan 66'; Rosemonde Kouassi 85', 89'; Priscille Kreto 90+3'	Report		Stadium: Parc des sports de Treichville

13 May 2019 WAFU Zone B Cup GS	Ivory Coast	0–0	Ghana	Abidjan
16:00 GMT		Report		Stadium: Robert Champroux Stadium; Referee: Patience Madu Ndidi (Nigeria)

16 May 2019 WAFU Zone B Cup SF	Ivory Coast	2–1	Mali	Abidjan
15:00 GMT	Ange N'Guessan 76'; Mariam Diakite	Report	Bassira Touré 45+3'	Stadium: Robert Champroux Stadium; Referee: Aurore Ligan (Benin)

18 May 2019 WAFU Zone B Cup F	Ivory Coast	1–1 (4–5 p)	Nigeria	Abidjan
17:30 GMT	Ange N'Guessan 42'	Report	Uchenna Kanu 90+4'	Stadium: Robert Champroux Stadium; Referee: Vincentia Amedome (Togo)
	Penalties
	Rosemonde Kouassi (penalty missed)		(penalty scored) Amarachi Okoronkwo; (penalty scored) Maryam Ibrahim; (penalty scored) Alice Ogebe; (penalty scored) Joy Bokiri; (penalty scored) Evelyn Nwabuoku

31 August 2020 CAF Olympic qualifying	Ivory Coast	3–0	Mali	Abidjan
15:30 GMT	Ines Nrehy 45+2'; Ange N'Guessan 61'; Rebecca Elloh 81'	Report		Stadium: Parc des sports de Treichville; Referee: Incaf El Harkaoui (Morocco)

3 September 2020 CAF Olympic qualifying	Mali	0–0	Ivory Coast	Bamako, Mali
16:00 GMT		Report		Stadium: Stade Mamadou Konaté

3 October 2020 CAF Olympic qualifying	Ivory Coast	0–0	Nigeria	Abidjan
15:30 GMT		Report		Stadium: Parc des sports de Treichville; Referee: Vincentia Amedome (Togo)

7 October 2020 CAF Olympic qualifying	Nigeria	1–1	Ivory Coast	Lagos, Nigeria
15:00 GMT	Asisat Oshoala 34'	Report	Nina Kpaho 12'	Stadium: Agege Stadium; Referee: Juliet Appiah (Ghana)

9 November 2020 CAF Olympic qualifying	Ivory Coast	0–0	Cameroon	Abidjan
15:30 GMT		Report		Stadium: Parc des sports de Treichville

12 November 2020 CAF Olympic qualifying	Cameroon	2–1	Ivory Coast	Yaoundé, Cameroon
14:30 GMT	Charlène Meyong 28'; Ajara Nchout 84' (pen.)	Report	Rebecca Elloh 47'	Stadium: Stade Ahmadou Ahidjo; Referee: Akhona Makalima (South Africa)

=== 2021 ===
20 October 2022 WAFCON qualification	Niger	0–9	Ivory Coast	Niamey, Niger
15:30 GMT		Report	Binta Diakité 8'; Rebecca Elloh 10'; Ida Guehai 24', 29', 30'; Ange N'Guessan 46', 48'; Ines Nrehy 55'; Rosemonde Kouassi 82'	Stadium: Stade Général Seyni Kountché; Referee: Aurore Ligan (Benin)

25 October 2022 WAFCON qualification	Ivory Coast	11–0	Niger	Abidjan
15:30 GMT	Ines Nrehy 1'; Fatou Coulibaly 19', 67'; Bernadette Kakounan 30'; Ida Guehai 35'; Rosemonde Kouassi 44', 79', 85'; Jessica Aby 53'; Rebecca Elloh 62'; Inès Konan 80'	Report		Stadium: Robert Champroux Stadium; Referee: Juliet Appiah (Ghana)

=== 2022 ===
18 February 2022 WAFCON qualification	Nigeria	2–0	Ivory Coast	Abuja, Nigeria
15:00 GMT	Ifeoma Onumonu 21', 56'	Report		Stadium: Moshood Abiola National Stadium; Referee: Jacqueline Nikiéma (Burkina Faso)

23 February 2022 WAFCON qualification	Ivory Coast	0–1	Nigeria	Abidjan
16:00 GMT	Fatou Coulibaly (penalty missed) 34'	Report	Esther Okoronkwo 87'	Stadium: Robert Champroux Stadium; Referee: Zouwaira Souley Sani (Niger)

23 June Friendly	Morocco	0–0	Ivory Coast	Rabat, Morocco
16:30 GMT		Report		Stadium: Prince Moulay Abdellah Stadium; Referee: Zakia El Grini (Morocco)

=== 2023 ===
18 July Hybrid Friendly	Algeria U20	0–13	Ivory Coast	Sidi Moussa, Algeria
18:00 GMT		Report	Rosemonde Kouassi 2', 7', 20', 21', 25', 44'; Ida Guehai 18'; Bernadette Kakounan 38'; Estelle Gnaly 45', 55'; Sandrine Niamien 49', 51'; Marie-Louise Hien 68'	Stadium: FAF National Technical Centre

22 September 2024 WAFCON qualification	Ivory Coast	2–0	Tanzania	Yamoussoukro
15:30 GMT	Frédérique Abrogoua 48'; Ida Guehai 55'	Report		Stadium: Stade de Yamoussoukro; Referee: Ghada Mehat (Algeria)

26 September 2024 WAFCON qualification	Tanzania	2–0 (4–2 p)	Ivory Coast	Chamazi, Tanzania
13:00 GMT	Donisia Minja 50'; Opah Clement 52'	Report		Stadium: Azam Complex Stadium
	Penalties
	Ester Mabanza (penalty scored); Anastazia Katunzi (penalty scored); Enekia Kasonga (penalty missed); Donisia Minja (penalty scored); Opa Clement (penalty scored)		(penalty scored) Mariam Diakité; (penalty missed) Nina Kpaho; (penalty scored) Ida Guehai; (penalty missed) Bernadette Kakounan

=== 2025 ===
4 April Friendly	Ivory Coast	2–0	Kenya	Abidjan
19:00 GMT	Amenan Grace N'dri 8'; Mariam Diakité 52'	Report		Stadium: Felix Houphouet Boigny Stadium

8 April Friendly	Ivory Coast	2–0	Kenya	Abidjan
19:00 GMT	Yasmine Timité 19'; Ami Diallo 63'	Report		Stadium: Felix Houphouet Boigny Stadium; Referee: Natacha Konan (Ivory Coast)

30 May Friendly	Ivory Coast	3–3	Ghana	Abidjan
19:00 GMT	Inès Konan 45', 80'; Rosemonde Kouassi 65'	Report	Sherifatu Sumaila 20'; Chantelle Boye-Hlorkah 41'; Nina Kpaho 52' (o.g.)	Stadium: Felix Houphouet Boigny Stadium; Referee: Edoh Kindedji (Togo)

3 June Friendly	Ivory Coast	1–0	Ghana	Abidjan
19:00 GMT	Habibou Ouédraogo 53'	Report		Stadium: Felix Houphouet Boigny Stadium

24 October 2026 WAFCON qualification	Senegal	0–0	Ivory Coast	Thiès, Senegal
17:00 GMT		Report		Stadium: Stade Lat-Dior; Referee: Mercy Mayimbo (Zimbabwe)

28 October 2026 WAFCON qualification	Ivory Coast	0–0 (4–5 p)	Senegal	Abidjan
19:00 GMT		Report		Stadium: Felix Houphouet Boigny Stadium; Referee: Shahenda El Maghrabi (Egypt)
	Penalties
	Bernadette Kakounan (penalty scored); Priscille Kreto (penalty scored); Anastasie Gbehi (penalty missed); Rebecca Elloh (penalty scored); Rosemonde Kouassi (penalty scored)		(penalty scored) Mama Diop; (penalty scored) Ndeye Awa Diakhaté; (penalty scored) Nguenar Ndiaye; (penalty scored) Hapsatou Malado Diallo; (penalty scored) Marème Babou

=== 2026 ===
28 February Friendly	Ivory Coast	2–1	Benin	Abidjan
17:00 GMT	Grâce Sery 18'; Inès Konan 29'	Report	Romaine Gandonou 60' (pen.)	Stadium: Felix Houphouet Boigny Stadium

4 March Friendly	Ivory Coast	1–0	Kenya	Abidjan
19:00 GMT	Rebecca Elloh 22'	Report		Stadium: Alassane Ouattara Stadium

9 April 2026 FIFA Women's Series	Ivory Coast	8–0	Mauritania	Abidjan
19:30 GMT	Priscille Kreto 6', 13', 31'; Bernadette Amani 23'; Habibou Ouédraogo 41', 43'; Essi Dagba 65'; Akébié Abrogoua 79'	Report		Stadium: Alassane Ouattara Stadium; Referee: Jacqueline Nikiéma (Burkina Faso)

12 April 2026 FIFA Women's Series	Turks and Caicos Isl.	1–15	Ivory Coast	Abidjan
19:30 GMT	Irener Moline 28'	Report	Ami Diallo 6', 10', 23', 42'; Priscille Kreto 12' (pen.), 22', 27', 52'; Rosemonde Kouassi 32'; Sylviane Kokora 45'; Ange N'Guessan 45+3' (pen.); Inès Konan 47', 77', 83'; Akébié Abrogoua 90+2'	Stadium: Alassane Ouattara Stadium; Referee: Edoh Kindedji (Togo)

16 April 2026 FIFA Women's Series	Ivory Coast	2–0	Pakistan	Abidjan
19:30 GMT	Ami Diallo 40'; Habibou Ouédraogo 69'	Report (FIFA)		Stadium: Alassane Ouattara Stadium; Referee: Jacqueline Nikiéma (Burkina Faso)

5 June Friendly	Ivory Coast	3–0	Cape Verde	Abidjan
19:00 GMT	Rosemonde Kouassi 28', 60'; N'Sira Ouédraogo 45+2'	Report		Stadium: Felix Houphouet Boigny Stadium

8 June Friendly	Ivory Coast	0–0	Cape Verde	Abidjan
19:00 GMT		Report		Stadium: Felix Houphouet Boigny Stadium; Referee: Félicité Kourouma (Guinea)

14 July Friendly	Ghana	1–0	Ivory Coast	Casablanca, Morocco
17:00 GMT	Sharon Sampson 75'	Report		Stadium: Père Jégo Stadium

20 July Friendly	Mali	0–1	Ivory Coast	Berrechid, Morocco
17:00 GMT		Report	Grâce Sery 42'	Stadium: Berrechid Municipal Stadium

27 July 2026 WAfCON GS	Ivory Coast	4–1	Burkina Faso	Casablanca, Morocco
20:00 GMT	Rebecca Elloh 7' (pen.); Inès Konan 16', 23'; N'Sira Ouédraogo 56'	Report	Adama Congo 60'	Stadium: Larbi Zaouli Stadium; Referee: Josephine Wanjiku (Kenya)

31 July 2026 WAfCON GS	South Africa	2–2	Ivory Coast	Casablanca, Morocco
17:00 GMT	Thembi Kgatlana 71'; Hildah Magaia 90+9'	Report	Grâce Sery 18', 36'	Stadium: Moulay Rachid Stadium; Referee: Rachel Zihindula (DR Congo)

4 August 2026 WAfCON GS	Tanzania	1–2	Ivory Coast	Casablanca, Morocco
20:00 GMT	Diana Msewa 90+9' (pen.)	Report	N'Sira Ouédraogo 44'; Inès Konan 68' (pen.)	Stadium: Larbi Zaouli Stadium; Referee: Antsino Twanyanyukwa (Namibia)

8 August 2026 WAfCON QF	Ivory Coast	1–2	Algeria	Casablanca, Morocco
17:00 GMT	Inès Konan 29'; N'Sira Ouedraogo (red card) 42'; Rebecca Elloh (penalty missed) 62'	Report	Inès Khiri 56'; Amira Ould Braham 64'	Stadium: Moulay Rachid Stadium; Referee: Shamirah Nabadda (Uganda)

13 August 2027 World Cup Qualifier	Ivory Coast	1–2	Ghana	Casablanca, Morocco
17:00 GMT	Inès Konan 4' (pen.)	Report	Princess Marfo 59'; Josephine Bonsu 72' (pen.)	Stadium: Larbi Zaouli Stadium; Referee: Akhona Makalima (South Africa)

9 October 2028 CAF Olympic qualifying	DR Congo	1–4	Ivory Coast	Lubumbashi, DR Congo
13:30 GMT	Anastasia Soulac 16'	Report	Grâce Sery 3' (pen.), 20'; Estelle Gnaly 49'; Karidja Fofana 53'	Stadium: TP Mazembe Stadium; Referee: Diana Murungi (Uganda)

13 October 2028 CAF Olympic qualifying	Ivory Coast	3–0	DR Congo	Abidjan
19:00 GMT	N'Sira Ouédraogo 18'; Nadja Meïté 24'; Grâce Sery 90+3'	Report		Stadium: Felix Houphouet Boigny Stadium

=== 2027 ===
February 2028 CAF Olympic qualifying	Cameroon	v	Ivory Coast

March 2028 CAF Olympic qualifying	Ivory Coast	v	Cameroon

== See also ==
- Ivory Coast women's national football team
- Ivory Coast national football team results (2020–present)
