= 2014 African Women's Championship qualification =

Tournament details
- Dates: 14 February – 8 June 2014
- Teams: 25 (from 1 confederation)

Tournament statistics
- Matches played: 27
- Goals scored: 83 (3.07 per match)
- Top scorer(s): (Ghana) Faiza Ibrahim (South Africa) Portia Modise (Nigeria) Desire Oparanozie (Nigeria) Asisat Oshoala (South Africa) Leandra Smeda (4 goals)

The qualification procedure for the 2014 African Women's Championship, the continent's women's association football championship started on 14 February 2014. A record 25 teams applied for the 2014 African Women's Championship. Four teams eventually withdrew before playing any match.

This tournament also served as the first stage of qualification for the 2015 FIFA Women's World Cup for the African zone.

Qualification ties were played on a home-and-away two-legged basis. If the sides were level on aggregate after the second leg, the away goals rule was applied, and if still level, the tie proceeded directly to a penalty shoot-out (no extra time was played).

== First round ==
The best placed teams from the 2012 tournament Cameroon, Equatorial Guinea and South Africa received a bye to the second round.

The first round was held on 14–16 February (first leg) and 28 February–2 March 2014 (second leg).

Team 1	Agg.	Team 2	1st leg	2nd leg
Algeria	2–0	Morocco	2–0	0–0
Egypt	2–5	Tunisia	0–3	2–2
Ethiopia	w/o^{1}	South Sudan	—	—
Burkina Faso	0–6	Ghana	0–3	0–3
Ivory Coast	5–0	Mali	4–0	1–0
Rwanda	2–2 (a)	Kenya	1–0	1–2
Nigeria	w/o^{2}	Sierra Leone	—	—
Guinea-Bissau	w/o^{3}	Senegal	—	—
Mozambique	w/o^{1}	Comoros	—	—
Botswana	1–3	Zimbabwe	0–1	1–2
Zambia	3–2	Tanzania	2–1	1–1

- ^{1} South Sudan and Mozambique withdrew. Ethiopia and Comoros advance to the next round.
- ^{2} Sierra Leone withdrew from the match because of financial problems. Nigeria advanced to the next round.
- ^{3} Guinea Bissau withdrew. Senegal advanced to the next round.

14 February 2014
17:00 UTC+1

Algeria	2–0	Morocco
Bouhani 11', 56'	Report

Stade Omar Hamadi, Algiers
Referee: Kankou Coulibaly (Mali)
1 March 2014
18:00 UTC±0

Morocco	0–0	Algeria
	Report

Prince Moulay Abdellah Stadium, Rabat
Referee: Fatou Thioune (Senegal)

Algeria won 2–0 on aggregate.

16 February 2014
15:30 UTC+2

Egypt	0–3	Tunisia
	Report	Hidouri 23'; Gomri 45'; Maknoun 50'

Al Ahly Training Centre, 6th October City
Referee: Alla Ali Abdelssmad (Sudan)
1 March 2014
15:00 UTC+1

Tunisia	2–2	Egypt
Houij 4' (pen.); Hidouri 61'	Report	Tarek 18'; Abdallah 77'

Stade 15 Octobre, Bizerte
Referee: Nabikko Ssemambo (Uganda)

Tunisia won 5–2 on aggregate.

14 February 2014

Ethiopia	Cancelled	South Sudan
	Report

28 February 2014

South Sudan	Cancelled	Ethiopia
	Report

Ethiopia won by default.

16 February 2014
17:00 UTC±0

Burkina Faso	0–3	Ghana
	Report	Ibrahim 4', 19'; Aduako 9'

Stade du 4-Août, Ouagadougou
Referee: Sara Mohamed Ramadan (Egypt)
1 March 2014
15:00 UTC±0

Ghana	3–0	Burkina Faso
Ibrahim 20'; Aduako 26' (pen.), 72'	Report

Accra Sports Stadium, Accra
Referee: Ajayi Foluso Adewuyi (Nigeria)

Ghana won 6–0 on aggregate.

15 February 2014
15:30 UTC±0

Ivory Coast	4–0	Mali
Gnago 5' (pen.); Nahi 72'; Nrehy 80'; Elloh 85'	Report

Stade Robert Champroux, Abidjan
Referee: Monia Bedoui (Tunisia)
28 February 2014
17:00 UTC±0

Mali	0–1	Ivory Coast
	Report	Nrehy 49'

Stade Modibo Keïta, Bamako
Referee: Ross Leopoldina Dayves (Guinea-Bissau)

Ivory Coast won 5–0 on aggregate.

16 February 2014
15:30 UTC+2

Rwanda	1–0	Kenya
Niyoyita 29'	Report

Stade Régional Nyamirambo, Kigali
Referee: Thérèse Sylvie Abou'ou (Cameroon)
2 March 2014
16:00 UTC+3

Kenya	2–1	Rwanda
Ogolla 14'; Amau 40'	Report	Nyirahatashima 29'

Kenyatta Stadium, Machakos
Referee: Bolokanang Julia Lekgow (Botswana)

2–2 on aggregate. Rwanda won by away goals.

14 February 2014

Nigeria	Cancelled	Sierra Leone
	Report

28 February 2014

Sierra Leone	Cancelled	Nigeria
	Report

Nigeria won by default.

14 February 2014

Guinea-Bissau	Cancelled	Senegal
	Report

28 February 2014

Senegal	Cancelled	Guinea-Bissau
	Report

Senegal won by default.

14 February 2014

Mozambique	Cancelled	Comoros
	Report

28 February 2014

Comoros	Cancelled	Mozambique
	Report

Comoros won by default.

14 February 2014
16:00 UTC+2

Botswana	0–1	Zimbabwe
	Report	Bepete 43'

SSKB Stadium, Gaborone
Referee: Gladys Lengwe (Zambia)
2 March 2014
15:00 UTC+2

Zimbabwe	2–1	Botswana
Makore 9'; Nyaumwe 14'	Report	Ngenda 90'

Rufaro Stadium, Harare
Referee: Lufuno Bevley Nemagovhani (South Africa)

Zimbabwe won 3–1 on aggregate.

14 February 2014
15:00 UTC+2

Zambia	2–1	Tanzania
Mubanga 78'; Zulu 82'	Report	Daniel 90'

Nkoloma Stadium, Lusaka
Referee: Salma Mukansanga (Rwanda)
28 February 2014
15:00 UTC+3

Tanzania	1–1	Zambia
Rashid 39'	Report	Banda 80'

Benjamin Mkapa National Stadium, Dar es Salaam
Referee: Inès Niyonsaba (Burundi)

Zambia won 3–2 on aggregate.

== Second round ==
The second round was held on 23–25 May (first leg) and 6–8 June 2014 (second leg).

Team 1	Agg.	Team 2	1st leg	2nd leg
Algeria	5–3	Tunisia	2–1	3–2
Ethiopia	0–5	Ghana	0–2	0–3
Ivory Coast	3–3 (a)	Equatorial Guinea	1–1	2–2
Rwanda	1–12	Nigeria	1–4	0–8
Senegal	1–2	Cameroon	1–1	0–1
Comoros	w/o^{4}	South Africa	0–13	—
Zimbabwe	0–2	Zambia	0–1	0–1

- ^{4} Comoros withdrew before the second leg, thus South Africa advanced to the final tournament.

23 May 2014
18:00 UTC+1

Algeria	2–1	Tunisia
Laifa 1'; Sekouane 45' (pen.)	Report	Kaabachi 20'

Stade Omar Hamadi, Algiers
Referee: Aissatou Keita (Guinea)
8 June 2014
16:00 UTC+1

Tunisia	2–3	Algeria
Kaabachi 13', 32'	Report	Bouhani 8'; Bekhedda 44' (pen.); Sekouane 81'

Stade 15 Octobre, Bizerte
Referee: Damaris Kimani (Kenya)

Algeria won 5–3 on aggregate.

25 May 2014
16:00 UTC+3

Ethiopia	0–2	Ghana
	Report	Cudjoe 43'; Suleman 55'

Addis Ababa Stadium, Addis Ababa
Referee: Lilia Abdeljaoued (Tunisia)
8 June 2014
15:00 UTC±0

Ghana	3–0	Ethiopia
Ibrahim 24' (pen.); Cudjoe 27'; Kobblah 83'	Report

Tamale Stadium, Tamale
Referee: Incaf El Harkaoui (Morocco)

Ghana won 5–0 on aggregate.

23 May 2014
16:00 UTC±0

Ivory Coast	1–1	Equatorial Guinea
Diakité 37' (pen.)	Report	Añonma 32'

Stade Robert Champroux, Abidjan
Referee: Fadouma Dia (Senegal)
7 June 2014
16:00 UTC+1

Equatorial Guinea	2–2	Ivory Coast
Jade 3'; Chuigoué 89'	Report	Guehai 35'; N'Guessan 86'

Estadio Internacional, Malabo
Referee: Therese Neguel (Cameroon)

3–3 on aggregate. Ivory Coast won on away goals.

24 May 2014
15:30 UTC+2

Rwanda	1–4	Nigeria
Mukamana 65'	Report	Oshoala 35', 40'; Sunday 48'; Oparanozie 70' (pen.)

Stade Régional Nyamirambo, Kigali
Referee: Alla Abdelssmad (Sudan)
7 June 2014
16:00 UTC+1

Nigeria	8–0	Rwanda
Edoho 10'; Oshoala 19', 81'; Oparanozie 20', 30', 52'; Sunday 41'; Nku 89'	Report

Abuja Stadium, Abuja
Referee: Sara Ramadan (Egypt)

Nigeria won 12–1 on aggregate.

24 May 2014
17:00 UTC±0

Senegal	1–1	Cameroon
Sylla 76'	Report	Njoya 58'

Stade Aline Sitoe Diatta, Ziguinchor
Referee: Christine Ziga (Ghana)
8 June 2014
15:30 UTC+1

Cameroon	1–0	Senegal
Edoa 67'	Report

Stade Ahmadou Ahidjo, Yaoundé
Referee: Aya Ahoua (Ivory Coast)

Cameroon won 2–1 on aggregate.

23 May 2014
15:00 UTC+3

Comoros	0–13	South Africa
	Report	Portia 13', 19', 43', 49' (pen.); Smeda 25', 34', 54', 60'; Ntsibande 64'; Mollo 65', 68'; Nogwanya 75' (pen.); Makhabane 85'

Stade Said Mohamed Cheikh, Mitsamiouli
Referee: Maria Rivet (Mauritius)
7 June 2014

South Africa	Cancelled	Comoros
	Report

Referee: Gladys Lengwe (Zambia)

South Africa won by default.

25 May 2014
15:00 UTC+2

Zimbabwe	0–1	Zambia
	Report	Mubanga 64'

Rufaro Stadium, Harare
Referee: Nabikko Ssemambo (Uganda)
8 June 2014
15:00 UTC+2

Zambia	1–0	Zimbabwe
Mubanga 36'	Report

Nkoloma Stadium, Lusaka
Referee: Marximina Bernardo (Angola)

Zambia won 2–0 on aggregate.

== Qualified teams ==
- Algeria
- Cameroon
- Ghana
- Ivory Coast
- Namibia (hosts)
- Nigeria
- South Africa
- Zambia

== Goalscorers ==
4 goals

- (Ghana) Faiza Ibrahim
- (Nigeria) Azizat Oshoala
- (Nigeria) Desire Oparanozie
- (South Africa) Portia Modise
- (South Africa) Leandra Smeda

3 goals

- (Algeria) Naïma Bouhani
- (Tunisia) Ella Kaabachi
- (Zambia) Hellen Mubanga

2 goals

- (Algeria) Fatima Sekouane
- (Ghana) Agnes Aduako
- (Ghana) Elizabeth Cudjoe
- (Ivory Coast) Ines Nrehy
- (Nigeria) Esther Sunday
- (South Africa) Sanah Mollo
- (Tunisia) Zina Hidouri

1 goal

- (Algeria) Fethia Bekhedda
- (Algeria) Nachida Laifa
- (Botswana) Dame Ngenda
- (Cameroon) Francine Zouga
- (Cameroon) Njoya Nkout
- (Egypt) Sara Abdallah
- (Egypt) Salma Tarek
- (Equatorial Guinea) Dorine Chuigoué
- (Equatorial Guinea) Genoveva Añonma
- (Equatorial Guinea) Jade Boho
- (Ghana) Hillia Kobblah
- (Ghana) Samira Suleman
- (Ivory Coast) Josée Nahi
- (Ivory Coast) Ida Guehai
- (Ivory Coast) Jeanne Gnago
- (Ivory Coast) Ange N'Guessan
- (Ivory Coast) Mariam Diakité
- (Ivory Coast) Rebecca Elloh
- (Kenya) Jackie Ogolla
- (Kenya) Mural Amau
- (Nigeria) Blessing Edoho
- (Nigeria) Cecilia Nku
- (Rwanda) Alice Niyoyita
- (Rwanda) Jeanne Nyirahatashima
- (Rwanda) Clementine Mukamana
- (Senegal) Sakhla Sylla
- (South Africa) Mamello Makhabane
- (South Africa) Nomathemba Ntsibande
- (South Africa) Shiwe Nogwanya
- (Tanzania) Asha Rashid
- (Tanzania) Donasia Daniel
- (Tunisia) Dhekra Gomri
- (Tunisia) Leïla Maknoun
- (Tunisia) Meriem Houij
- (Zambia) Susan Banda
- (Zambia) Misozi Zulu
- (Zimbabwe) Violet Bepete
- (Zimbabwe) Rutendo Makore
- (Zimbabwe) Marjoury Nyaumwe
