= 2018 Women's Africa Cup of Nations qualification =

Tournament details
- Dates: 4 April – 11 June 2018
- Teams: 24 (from 1 confederation)

Tournament statistics
- Matches played: 32
- Goals scored: 95 (2.97 per match)
- Top scorer: (Ethiopia) Loza Abera (8 goals)

The 2018 Women's Africa Cup of Nations qualification was a women's football competition which decided the participating teams of the 2018 Women's Africa Cup of Nations.

A total of eight teams qualified to play in the final tournament, including Ghana who qualified automatically as hosts.

== Teams ==
Apart from Ghana, the remaining 53 members of CAF were eligible to enter the qualifying competition, and a total of 24 national teams were in the qualifying draw, which was announced in early October 2017.

Equatorial Guinea were initially banned from the 2018 Africa Women Cup of Nations, but were reinstated after the ban was lifted in July 2017 at an emergency CAF committee meeting, and were included in the qualifying draw. However, FIFA banned them from qualifying for the 2019 FIFA Women's World Cup, meaning they could not qualify for the World Cup regardless of their performance in the Africa Women Cup of Nations.

FIFA Women's World Rankings in September 2017 in brackets (NR=Not ranked).

Final tournament hosts	Bye to second round (4 teams)	First round entrants (20 teams)
**Ghana** (46)	**Nigeria** (35); **Cameroon** (47); **Equatorial Guinea** (51); **South Africa** (52)	Ivory Coast (63); Morocco (72); **Algeria** (74); Senegal (78); Zimbabwe (83); **Mali** (85); Ethiopia (93); Burkina Faso (101); **Zambia** (102); Namibia (103); Tanzania (108); Kenya (114); Uganda (115); Central African Republic (NR); Congo (NR); Gambia (NR); Lesotho (NR); Libya (NR); Sierra Leone (NR); Swaziland (NR)

Notes

- Teams in **bold** qualified for the final tournament.

Did not enter

- Angola (NR)
- Benin (NR)
- Botswana (118)
- Burundi (NR)
- Cape Verde (NR)
- Chad (NR)
- Comoros (NR)
- Djibouti (NR)
- DR Congo (NR)
- Egypt (77)
- Eritrea (NR)
- Gabon (NR)
- Guinea (98)
- Guinea-Bissau (NR)
- Liberia (NR)
- Madagascar (NR)
- Malawi (NR)
- Mauritania (NR)
- Mauritius (NR)
- Mozambique (NR)
- Niger (NR)
- Rwanda (111)
- São Tomé and Príncipe (NR)
- Seychelles (NR)
- Somalia (NR)
- South Sudan (NR)
- Sudan (NR)
- Togo (NR)
- Tunisia (71)

== Format ==
Qualification ties are played on a home-and-away two-legged basis. If the aggregate score is tied after the second leg, the away goals rule is applied, and if still tied, the penalty shoot-out (no extra time) is used to determine the winner.

== Schedule ==
The schedule of the qualifying rounds is as follows.

Round	Dates
First round	4–10 April 2018
Second round	4–12 June 2018

The first round was originally scheduled for 26 February – 6 March 2018, and the second round for 2–10 April 2018, but the dates were moved due to a clash with the CAF Women's Symposium in early March.

== Bracket ==
The seven winners of the second round qualified for the final tournament.

First round
1	Senegal	2	0	2
4	Algeria	1	2	3
3	Libya	0	0	0
2	Ethiopia	8	7	15

Second round
Algeria	3	3	6
Ethiopia	1	2	3

First round
1	Morocco	1	0	1
4	Ivory Coast (a)	1	0	1
3	Sierra Leone	—	—
2	Mali	—	—	w/o

Second round
Ivory Coast	2	0	2
Mali (a)	2	0	2

First round					Second round
1	Burkina Faso	2	1	3 (3 p)
4	Gambia	1	2	3 (5 p)
4	Gambia	1	2	3 (5 p)	Gambia	0	0	0
					Nigeria	1	6	7

First round					Second round
1	Congo	2	1	3
4	Central African Republic	0	1	1
4	Central African Republic	0	1	1	Congo	0	0	0
					Cameroon	5	5	10

First round					Second round
1	Kenya	1	0	1
4	Uganda	0	0	0
4	Uganda	0	0	0	Kenya	2	0	2
					Equatorial Guinea	1	2	3

First round					Second round
1	Lesotho	1	2	3
4	Eswatini	0	1	1
4	Eswatini	0	1	1	Lesotho	0	0	0
					South Africa	1	6	7

First round
1	Tanzania	3	1	4
4	Zambia (a)	3	1	4
3	Namibia	0	0	0
2	Zimbabwe	2	2	4

Second round
Zambia (a)	0	2	2
Zimbabwe	1	1	2

== First round ==
=== Overview ===
Team 1	Agg.	Team 2	1st leg	2nd leg
Senegal	2–3	Algeria	2–1	0–2
Libya	0–15	Ethiopia	0–8	0–7
Morocco	1–1 (a)	Ivory Coast	1–1	0–0
Sierra Leone	w/o	Mali	—	—
Burkina Faso	3–3 (3–5 p)	Gambia	2–1	1–2
Congo	3–1	Central African Republic	2–0	1–1
Kenya	1–0	Uganda	1–0	0–0
Lesotho	3–1	Eswatini	1–0	2–1
Tanzania	4–4 (a)	Zambia	3–3	1–1
Namibia	0–4	Zimbabwe	0–2	0–2

=== Matches ===
4 April 2018
17:00 UTC+0

Senegal	2–1	Algeria
Diédhiou 6' (pen.); Diop 10'	Report	Benlazar 38'

Stade Al Djigo, Dakar
Referee: Vincentia Enyonam Amedome (Togo)
10 April 2018
17:45 UTC+1

Algeria	2–0	Senegal
Sekouane 24' (pen.); Benaichouche 90+3'	Report

20 August Stadium, Algiers
Referee: Zomadre Sonia Kore (Ivory Coast)

Algeria won 3–2 on aggregate.

4 April 2018
15:00 UTC+2

Libya	0–8	Ethiopia
	Report	Zergaw 4', 20', 61'; Abera 18', 23'; Feleke 32'; Tadesse 44'; Kefyalew 47'

Petro Sport Stadium, Cairo (Egypt) (Note: Libya played their home matches outside Libya due to security concerns from the ongoing civil war.)
Referee: Theresa Bremansu (Ghana)
10 April 2018
16:00 UTC+3

Ethiopia	7–0	Libya
Buwli 13'; Abera 27', 51', 82', 87'; Zergaw 45'; Boyzo 74'	Report

Addis Ababa Stadium, Addis Ababa
Referee: Salima Mukansanga (Rwanda)

Ethiopia won 15–0 on aggregate.

6 April 2018
16:00 UTC+1

Morocco	1–1	Ivory Coast
Chebbak 76'	Report	F. Coulibaly 52' (pen.)

Complexe Moulay El Hassan, Rabat
Referee: Thérèse Neguel (Cameroon)
10 April 2018
15:00 UTC+0

Ivory Coast	0–0	Morocco
	Report

Stade Félix Houphouët-Boigny, Abidjan
Referee: Gladys Lengwe (Zambia)

1–1 on aggregate. Ivory Coast won on away goals.

7 April 2018

Sierra Leone	Cancelled	Mali
	Report

Referee: Ajayi Foluso Adewuyi (Nigeria)
10 April 2018
17:00 UTC+0

Mali	Cancelled	Sierra Leone
	Report

Stade Mamadou Konaté, Bamako
Referee: Dorsaf Ganouati (Tunisia)

Mali advanced on walkover after Sierra Leone withdrew.

7 April 2018
16:00 UTC+0

Burkina Faso	2–1	Gambia
S. Simporé 27', 80'	Report	Ad. Tamba 23'

Stade du 4 Août, Ouagadougou
Referee: Fatou Thioune (Senegal)
10 April 2018
16:30 UTC+0

Gambia	2–1	Burkina Faso
Ad. Tamba 19'; Kouanda 20' (o.g.)	Report	S. Simporé 53'
Penalties
Penalty scored	5–3	(order unknown)

Independence Stadium, Bakau
Referee: Bouchra Karboubi (Morocco)

3–3 on aggregate. Gambia won 5–3 on penalties.

4 April 2018
15:30 UTC+1

Congo	2–0	Central African Republic
Kokolo 40' (pen.); Dembélé 44'	Report

Stade Alphonse Massemba-Débat, Brazzaville
Referee: Jonesia Rukyaa Kabakama (Tanzania)
8 April 2018
15:00 UTC+1

Central African Republic	1–1	Congo
Demba 71'	Report	Dembélé 18'

Barthélemy Boganda Stadium, Bangui
Referee: Suavis Iratunga (Burundi)

Congo won 3–1 on aggregate.

4 April 2018
15:00 UTC+3

Kenya	1–0	Uganda
Adera 53'	Report

Kenyatta Stadium, Machakos
Referee: Letticia Antonella Viana (Swaziland)
8 April 2018
16:00 UTC+3

Uganda	0–0	Kenya
	Report

Phillip Omondi Stadium, Kampala
Referee: Akhona Makalima (South Africa)

Kenya won 1–0 on aggregate.

6 April 2018
16:00 UTC+2

Lesotho	1–0	Eswatini
Maloro 18'	Report

Setsoto Stadium, Maseru
Referee: Anaelle Valerie Omanda (Gabon)
10 April 2018
15:00 UTC+2

Eswatini	1–2	Lesotho
Dlamini 88'	Report	Kheme 30'; Lebakeng 65'

Somhlolo National Stadium, Lobamba
Referee: Maria Rivet (Mauritius)

Lesotho won 3–1 on aggregate.

4 April 2018
16:00 UTC+3

Tanzania	3–3	Zambia
Athumani 1'; Rashid 22', 47'	Report	Banda 25', 78'; Zulu 46'

National Stadium, Dar es Salaam
Referee: Lamngar Lare (Chad)
8 April 2018
15:00 UTC+2

Zambia	1–1	Tanzania
Kundananji 2'	Report	Minja 71'

Nkoloma Stadium, Lusaka
Referee: Lidya Tafesse (Ethiopia)

4–4 on aggregate. Zambia won on away goals.

5 April 2018
18:00 UTC+2

Namibia	0–2	Zimbabwe
	Report	Nyaumwe 21'; Chirandu 89'

Sam Nujoma Stadium, Windhoek
Referee: Chancelle Cynthia Imane Ngakossa (Congo)
8 April 2018
15:00 UTC+2

Zimbabwe	2–0	Namibia
Msipa 73'; Chirandu 84'	Report

Rufaro Stadium, Harare
Referee: Carolyne Wanjala (Kenya)

Zimbabwe won 4–0 on aggregate.

== Second round ==
Winners qualified for 2018 Africa Women Cup of Nations.

=== Overview ===
Team 1	Agg.	Team 2	1st leg	2nd leg
Algeria	6–3	Ethiopia	3–1	3–2
Ivory Coast	2–2 (a)	Mali	2–2	0–0
Gambia	0–7	Nigeria	0–1	0–6
Congo	0–10	Cameroon	0–5	0–5
Kenya	2–3	Equatorial Guinea	2–1	0–2
Lesotho	0–7	South Africa	0–1	0–6
Zambia	2–2 (a)	Zimbabwe	0–1	2–1

=== Matches ===
6 June 2018
22:00 UTC+1

Algeria	3–1	Ethiopia
Ramdani 19'; Sidhoum 32'; Sekouane 68'	Report	Biza 16'

5 July Stadium, Algiers
Referee: Isatou Touray (Gambia)
10 June 2018
16:00 UTC+3

Ethiopia	2–3	Algeria
Abera 63', 72'	Report	Bouhani 18'; Sekouane 45+2'; Benlazar 53'

Addis Ababa Stadium, Addis Ababa
Referee: Dorsaf Ganouati (Tunisia)

Algeria won 6–3 on aggregate.

6 June 2018
16:00 UTC+0

Ivory Coast	2–2	Mali
Elloh 37' (pen.); N'Guessan 90'	Report	Tangara 7'; Touré 47'

Stade Félix Houphouët-Boigny, Abidjan
Referee: Aurore Christelle M. Ligan (Benin)
10 June 2018
16:30 UTC+0

Mali	0–0	Ivory Coast
	Report

Stade Mamadou Konaté, Bamako
Referee: Bouchra Karboubi (Morocco)

2–2 on aggregate. Mali won on away goals.

6 June 2018
16:00 UTC+0

Gambia	0–1	Nigeria
	Report	Okoronkwo 19'

Independence Stadium, Bakau
Referee: Teneba Bagayoko (Mali)
11 June 2018
16:00 UTC+1

Nigeria	6–0	Gambia
Oparanozie 3' (pen.), 49', 69', 83'; Oshoala 44', 74'	Report

Agege Stadium, Lagos
Referee: Lidya Tafesse (Ethiopia)

Nigeria won 7–0 on aggregate.

6 June 2018
15:30 UTC+1

Congo	0–5	Cameroon
	Report	Abena 2'; Nchout 27'; Mani 29'; Yango 61' (pen.); Onguéné 64'

Stade Alphonse Massemba-Débat, Brazzaville
Referee: Mathabo Maria Kolokotoane (Lesotho)
9 June 2018
15:30 UTC+1

Cameroon	5–0	Congo
Nchout 19'; Abena 22'; Onguéné 51', 53'; Akaba 84'	Report

Stade Ahmadou Ahidjo, Yaoundé
Referee: Ajayi Foluso Adewuyi (Nigeria)

Cameroon won 10–0 on aggregate.

6 June 2018
16:00 UTC+3

Kenya	2–1	Equatorial Guinea
Engesha 41'; Akida 82'	Report	Boho 39'

Kenyatta Stadium, Machakos
Referee: Julie Kanyembo Kyabuta (DR Congo)
9 June 2018
17:00 UTC+1

Equatorial Guinea	2–0	Kenya
Chinasa 61'; Nke 63'	Report

Estadio de Malabo, Malabo
Referee: Gladys Lengwe (Zambia)

Equatorial Guinea won 3–2 on aggregate. On 17 October 2018, Kenya were awarded the tie after Equatorial Guinea were disqualified for fielding an ineligible player. However, on 7 November 2018, the decision was overturned on appeal.

6 June 2018
15:00 UTC+2

Lesotho	0–1	South Africa
	Report	Seoposenwe 9'

Setsoto Stadium, Maseru
Referee: Thanks Nyahuye (Zimbabwe)
10 June 2018
15:00 UTC+2

South Africa	6–0	Lesotho
Seoposenwe 2', 60', 83'; Esau 5', 51'; Magaia 79'	Report

Dr. Petrus Molemela Stadium, Bloemfontein
Referee: Shamirah Nabadda (Uganda)

South Africa won 7–0 on aggregate.

6 June 2018
15:00 UTC+2

Zambia	0–1	Zimbabwe
	Report	Nyaumwe 18'

Nkoloma Stadium, Lusaka
Referee: Nirinjanahary Raharijaona (Madagascar)
10 June 2018
15:00 UTC+2

Zimbabwe	1–2	Zambia
Jeke 45'	Report	Chanda 53'; Banda 86'

Rufaro Stadium, Harare
Referee: Chancelle Cynthia Imane Ngakossa (Congo)

2–2 on aggregate. Zambia won on away goals.

== Qualified teams ==
The following eight teams qualified for the final tournament.

Team	Qualified on	Previous appearances in Africa Women Cup of Nations^{1}
Ghana (hosts)	28 September 2016	11 (1991, 1995, 1998, 2000, 2002, 2004, 2006, 2008, 2010, 2014, 2016)
Algeria	10 June 2018	4 (2004, 2006, 2010, 2014)
Mali	10 June 2018	6 (2002, 2004, 2006, 2008, 2010, 2016)
Nigeria	11 June 2018	12 (**1991**, **1995**, **1998**, **2000**, **2002**, **2004**, **2006**, 2008, **2010**, 2012, **2014**, **2016**)
Cameroon	9 June 2018	12 (1991, 1995, 1998, 2000, 2002, 2004, 2006, 2008, 2010, 2012, 2014, 2016)
Equatorial Guinea	9 June 2018	4 (2006, **2008**, 2010, **2012**)
South Africa	10 June 2018	11 (1995, 1998, 2000, 2002, 2004, 2006, 2008, 2010, 2012, 2014, 2016)
Zambia	10 June 2018	2 (1995, 2014)

^{1} Bold indicates champions for that year. Italic indicates hosts for that year.

== Goalscorers ==
There were 95 goals scored in 32 matches, for an average of 2.97 goals per match.

8 goals

- (Ethiopia) Loza Abera

4 goals

- (Ethiopia) Rehima Zergaw
- (Nigeria) Desire Oparanozie
- (South Africa) Jermaine Seoposenwe

3 goals

- (Algeria) Fatima Sekouane
- (Burkina Faso) Salimata Simporé
- (Cameroon) Gabrielle Onguéné
- (Zambia) Barbra Banda

2 goals

- (Algeria) Myriam Benlazar
- (Cameroon) Ninon Abena
- (Cameroon) Ajara Nchout
- (Republic of the Congo) Adolphine Dembélé
- (The Gambia) Adama Tamba
- (Nigeria) Asisat Oshoala
- (South Africa) Chantelle Esau
- (Tanzania) Asha Rashid
- (Zimbabwe) Mavis Chirandu
- (Zimbabwe) Marjory Nyaumwe

1 goal

- (Algeria) Rahima Benaichouche
- (Algeria) Naïma Bouhani
- (Algeria) Madina Ramdani
- (Algeria) Assia Sidhoum
- (Cameroon) Henriette Akaba
- (Cameroon) Madeleine Ngono Mani
- (Cameroon) Jeannette Yango
- (Central African Republic) Christelle Demba
- (Republic of the Congo) Frangelle Kokolo
- (Equatorial Guinea) Jade Boho
- (Equatorial Guinea) Gloria Chinasa
- (Equatorial Guinea) Ghyslaine Nke
- (Ethiopia) Erehima Biza
- (Ethiopia) Senayt Boyzo
- (Ethiopia) Hiwot Buwli
- (Ethiopia) Mirkat Feleke
- (Ethiopia) Bethlehem Kefyalew
- (Ethiopia) Bizuayehu Tadesse
- (Ivory Coast) Fatou Coulibaly
- (Ivory Coast) Rebecca Elloh
- (Ivory Coast) Ange N'Guessan
- (Kenya) Lilian Adera
- (Kenya) Esse Akida
- (Kenya) Teresa Engesha
- (Lesotho) Lerato Kheme
- (Lesotho) Kholu Lebakeng
- (Lesotho) Litseoane Maloro
- (Mali) Hawa Tangara
- (Mali) Bassira Touré
- (Morocco) Ghizlane Chebbak
- (Nigeria) Amarachi Okoronkwo
- (Senegal) Mariama Diédhiou
- (Senegal) Mama Diop
- (South Africa) Hildah Magaia
- (Eswatini) Nokuthula Dlamini
- (Tanzania) Stumai Athumani
- (Tanzania) Donisia Minja
- (Zambia) Hellen Chanda
- (Zambia) Racheal Kundananji
- (Zambia) Misozi Zulu
- (Zimbabwe) Erina Jeke
- (Zimbabwe) Emmaculate Msipa

1 own goal

- (Burkina Faso) Ramata Kouanda (against Gambia)
