= 2016 Women's Africa Cup of Nations qualification =

Tournament details
- Dates: 4 March – 12 April 2016
- Teams: 23 (from 1 confederation)

Tournament statistics
- Matches played: 30
- Goals scored: 83 (2.77 per match)
- Top scorer: (Egypt) Aliaa Shoukry (5 goals)

The 2016 Women's Africa Cup of Nations qualification was a women's football competition which decided the participating teams of the 2016 Women's Africa Cup of Nations.

A total of eight teams qualified to play in the final tournament, including Cameroon who qualified automatically as hosts.

== Teams ==
A total of 23 CAF member national teams entered the qualifying rounds.

Round	Teams entering round	No. of teams
First round	Algeria; Botswana; Burkina Faso; DR Congo; Egypt; Ethiopia^{1}; Guinea; Kenya; Libya; Mali; Mauritius; Morocco; Namibia; Senegal; Tanzania; Tunisia; Zambia; Zimbabwe	18
Second round	Equatorial Guinea; Ghana; Ivory Coast; Nigeria; South Africa	5
Qualifying rounds	Total	23
Final tournament	Cameroon (hosts)	1

Did not enter
- Angola
- Benin
- Burundi
- Cape Verde
- Central African Republic
- Chad
- Comoros
- Congo
- Djibouti
- Eritrea
- Ethiopia
- Gabon
- Gambia
- Guinea-Bissau
- Lesotho
- Liberia
- Madagascar
- Malawi
- Mauritania
- Mozambique
- Niger
- Rwanda
- São Tomé and Príncipe
- Seychelles
- Sierra Leone
- Somalia
- South Sudan
- Sudan
- Swaziland
- Togo^{1}
- Uganda

^{1} Initially Togo entered the qualification but withdrew and were replaced by Ethiopia. Togo were sanctioned by the CAF and excluded from participating in the 2018 tournament.

== Format ==
Qualification ties were played on a home-and-away two-legged basis. If the aggregate score was tied after the second leg, the away goals rule would be applied, and if still level, the penalty shoot-out would be used to determine the winner (no extra time would be played).

The seven winners of the second round qualified for the final tournament.

== Schedule ==
The schedule of the qualifying rounds was as follows.

Round	Leg	Date
First round	First leg	4–6 March 2016
First round	Second leg	18–20 March 2016
Second round	First leg	6–9 April 2016
Second round	Second leg	10–12 April 2016

The second round was initially scheduled to be played on 8–10 April (first leg) and 22–24 April (second leg), but was later changed to be played during the FIFA International Match Calendar dates of 4–12 April.

== First round ==
Team 1	Agg.	Team 2	1st leg	2nd leg
Mali	2–1	Morocco	0–0	2–1
Tanzania	2–3	Zimbabwe	1–2	1–1
Zambia	5–3	Namibia	3–1	2–2
Libya	0–12	Egypt	0–8	0–4
Algeria	2–1	Ethiopia	1–0	1–1
Kenya	w.o.	DR Congo	—	—
Senegal	1–1 (4–2 p)	Guinea	1–0	0–1
Burkina Faso	0–2	Tunisia	0–0	0–2
Botswana	11–0	Mauritius	7–0	4–0

5 March 2016

Mali	0–0	Morocco
	Report

Stade Modibo Kéïta, Bamako
Referee: Christine Enyonam Ziga (Ghana)
19 March 2016

Morocco	1–2	Mali
Jraidi 4'	Report	Baradji 36'; Diarra 75'

Stade Boubker Ammar, Salé
Referee: Fatou Thioune (Senegal)

Mali won 2–1 on aggregate.

4 March 2016

Tanzania	1–2	Zimbabwe
Omary 17'	Report	Jeke 20', 48'

Chamazi Stadium, Dar es Salaam
Referee: Tsige Sisay (Ethiopia)
20 March 2016

Zimbabwe	1–1	Tanzania
Kaitano 11'	Report	Minja 4' (pen.)

Rufaro Stadium, Harare
Referee: Letticia Antonella Viana (Swaziland)

Zimbabwe won 3–2 on aggregate.

6 March 2016

Zambia	3–1	Namibia
Sosala 3', 45+2'; Chanda 22'	Report	Jossob 89'

Nkoloma Stadium, Lusaka
Referee: Maria Rivet (Mauritius)
18 March 2016

Namibia	2–2	Zambia
Coleman 48', 78' (pen.)	Report	Chanda 3', 46'

Sam Nujoma Stadium, Windhoek
Referee: Tania Marisa Duarte (Angola)

Zambia won 5–3 on aggregate.

6 March 2016

Libya	0–8	Egypt
	Report	Shoukry 4', 9', 12', 54'; Ali 28'; Engy 32' (pen.); Gazy 69'; Fayza 86' (pen.)

Stade Olympique de Sousse, Sousse (Tunisia)
Referee: Lilia Abdeljawad (Tunisia)
20 March 2016

Egypt	4–0	Libya
Tarek 4'; Mohammed 25'; Engy 36'; Shoukry 82'	Report

30 June Stadium, Cairo
Referee: Angelique Tuyishime (Rwanda)

Egypt won 12–0 on aggregate.

6 March 2016
16:00

Algeria	1–0	Ethiopia
Zerrouki 60'	Report (CAF)

Stade Omar Hamadi, Algiers
Attendance: 300
Referee: Aissatou Inter Keita (Guinea)
26 March 2016

Ethiopia	1–1	Algeria
Abera 34'	Report (CAF)	Zerrouki 85'

Yidnekachew Tessema Stadium, Addis Ababa
Referee: Zomadre Sonia Kore (Ivory Coast)

Algeria won 2–1 on aggregate.

5 March 2016

Kenya	Cancelled	DR Congo
	Report

18 March 2016

DR Congo	Cancelled	Kenya
	Report

Kenya advanced after DR Congo withdrew for financial reasons.

5 March 2016

Senegal	1–0	Guinea
Diakhaté 5'	Report

Stade Demba Diop, Dakar
Referee: Viviane Kouélé Igue (Benin)
19 March 2016

Guinea	1–0	Senegal
Kanté 82'	Report
Penalties
	2–4

Stade du 28 Septembre, Conakry
Referee: Ross Leopoldina Dayves (Guinea-Bissau)

1–1 on aggregate. Senegal won 4–2 on penalties.

5 March 2016

Burkina Faso	0–0	Tunisia
	Report

Stade du 4 Août, Ouagadougou
Referee: Kankou Coulibaly (Mali)
19 March 2016

Tunisia	2–0	Burkina Faso
Mamay 52'; Mchara 89'	Report

Stade Oued Ellil, Oued Ellil
Referee: Khadmallah Elsayed Angato Koko (Sudan)

Tunisia won 2–0 on aggregate.

5 March 2016

Botswana	7–0	Mauritius
Mahlasela 19', 52'; Otlhagile 45'; Motlhale 62'; Ngenda 71'; Selebatso 87'; Mathlo 90'	Report

Lobatse Stadium, Lobatse
Referee: Mercy Mziya (Malawi)
19 March 2016

Mauritius	0–4	Botswana
	Report	Lesaane 27'; Tholakele 28', 74'; Ramafifi 68'

Stade George V, Curepipe
Referee: Nirinjanahary Raharijaona (Madagascar)

Botswana won 11–0 on aggregate.

== Second round ==
Winners qualified for 2016 Africa Women Cup of Nations.

Team 1	Agg.	Team 2	1st leg	2nd leg
Mali	awd.	Equatorial Guinea	1–1	1–2
Zimbabwe	4–2	Zambia	1–0	3–2
Egypt	2–2 (a)	Ivory Coast	1–0	1–2
Algeria	3–3 (a)	Kenya	2–2	1–1
Senegal	1–3	Nigeria	1–1	0–2
Tunisia	1–6	Ghana	1–2	0–4
Botswana	0–5	South Africa	0–2	0–3

6 April 2016

Mali	1–1	Equatorial Guinea
Diarra 89'	Report	Añonma 2'

Stade Mamadou Konaté, Bamako
Referee: Aissatou Inter Keita (Guinea)
10 April 2016

Equatorial Guinea	2–1	Mali
Boho; Adriana Tiga 90'	Report	Koite 53'

Estadio de Malabo, Malabo
Referee: Bolokanang Julia Lekgow (Botswana)

Equatorial Guinea won 3–2 on aggregate.
Mali were awarded the tie after Equatorial Guinea were disqualified for fielding an ineligible player.

6 April 2016

Zimbabwe	1–0	Zambia
Bhasopo 45+1'	Report

Rufaro Stadium, Harare
Referee: Thérèse Neguel (Cameroon)
10 April 2016

Zambia	2–3	Zimbabwe
Sosala 24'; Zulu 60' (pen.)	Report	Bhasopo 7'; Zulu 39'; Msipa 90'

Nkoloma Stadium, Lusaka
Referee: Nabikko Ssemambo (Uganda)

Zimbabwe won 4–2 on aggregate.

7 April 2016

Egypt	1–0	Ivory Coast
Samir 45'	Report

30 June Stadium, Cairo
Referee: Aissata Ameyo Amegee (Togo)
11 April 2016

Ivory Coast	2–1	Egypt
Elloh 38'; Nrehy 43'	Report	Gamal 86'

Stade Robert Champroux, Abidjan
Referee: Jonesia Rukyaa Kabakama (Tanzania)

2–2 on aggregate. Egypt won on away goals rule.

8 April 2016

Algeria	2–2	Kenya
Bouhani 28', 89'	Report	Sekouane 78' (o.g.); Adam 84'

Stade Omar Hamadi, Algiers
Attendance: 1,000
Referee: Alcidia Maria Silva dos Santos (Cape Verde)
12 April 2016

Kenya	1–1	Algeria
Mango 75'	Report	Bouhani 22'

MISC Kasarani, Nairobi
Referee: Suavis Iratunga (Burundi)

3–3 on aggregate. Kenya won on away goals rule.

8 April 2016

Senegal	1–1	Nigeria
Diakhaté 52'	Report	Wogu 45'

Stade Demba Diop, Dakar
Referee: Lamyaa Lourarhi (Morocco)
12 April 2016

Nigeria	2–0	Senegal
Chikwelu 36'; Igbinovia 46'	Report

National Stadium, Abuja
Referee: Julie Kanyembo Kyabuta (DR Congo)

Nigeria won 3–1 on aggregate.

6 April 2016

Tunisia	1–2	Ghana
Kaabachi 33' (pen.)	Report	Suleman 50'; Adubea 84'

Stade Oued Ellil, Oued Ellil
Referee: Fadouma Dia (Senegal)
12 April 2016

Ghana	4–0	Tunisia
Suleman 28', 85'; Boakye 34'; Adubea 77'	Report

Accra Sports Stadium, Accra
Referee: Chancelle Cynthia Imane Ngakossa (Congo)

Ghana won 6–1 on aggregate.

9 April 2016

Botswana	0–2	South Africa
	Report	Mollo 69', 73'

Lobatse Stadium, Lobatse
Referee: Rusina Kuda Majo (Zimbabwe)
12 April 2016

South Africa	3–0	Botswana
Makhabane 19' (pen.); Mollo 27'; Nyandeni 36'	Report

Makhulong Stadium, Tembisa
Referee: Mathabo Maria Kolokotoane (Lesotho)

South Africa won 5–0 on aggregate.

== Qualified teams ==
The following eight teams qualified for the final tournament.

Team	Qualified on	Previous appearances in tournament^{1}
Cameroon (hosts)	26 October 2014	10 (1991, 1998, 2000, 2002, 2004, 2006, 2008, 2010, 2012, 2014)
Zimbabwe	10 April 2016	3 (2000, 2002, 2004)
Egypt	11 April 2016	1 (1998)
Kenya	12 April 2016	0 (debut)
Nigeria	12 April 2016	11 (**1991**, **1995**, **1998**, **2000**, **2002**, **2004**, **2006**, 2008, **2010**, 2012, **2014**)
Ghana	12 April 2016	10 (1991, 1995, 1998, 2000, 2002, 2004, 2006, 2008, 2010, 2014)
South Africa	12 April 2016	10 (1995, 1998, 2000, 2002, 2004, 2006, 2008, 2010, 2012, 2014)
Mali	4 August 2016	5 (2002, 2004, 2006, 2008, 2010)

^{1} Bold indicates champion for that year. Italic indicates host for that year.

== Goalscorers ==
5 goals

- (Egypt) Aliaa Shoukry*

3 goals

- (Algeria) Naïma Bouhani
- (Ghana) Samira Suleman
- (South Africa) Sanah Mollo
- (Zambia) Grace Chanda
- (Zambia) Noria Sosala

2 goals

- (Algeria) Dalila Zerrouki
- (Botswana) Nondi Mahlasela
- (Botswana) Refilwe Tholakele
- (Egypt) Engy Ahmed*
- (Ghana) Princella Adubea
- (Mali) Binta Diarra
- (Namibia) Zenatha Coleman
- (Senegal) Binta Diakhaté
- (Zimbabwe) Kudakwashe Bhasopo
- (Zimbabwe) Erina Jeke

1 goal

- (Botswana) Refilwe Mathlo
- (Botswana) Tlamelo Motlhale
- (Botswana) Bame Ngenda
- (Botswana) Bonang Otlhagile
- (Botswana) Thuto Ramafifi
- (Botswana) Golebaone Selebatso
- (Botswana) Lesaane Tshoso
- (Egypt) Mahira Ali
- (Egypt) Neivin Gamal
- (Egypt) Nadeen Gazy
- (Egypt) Fayza Hidar
- (Egypt) Mahira Ali Mohammed*
- (Egypt) Yasmine Samir
- (Egypt) Noha Tarek*
- (Equatorial Guinea) Genoveva Añonma
- (Equatorial Guinea) Jade Boho
- (Equatorial Guinea) Adriana Tiga
- (Ethiopia) Loza Abera
- (Ghana) Portia Boakye
- (Guinea) Fatoumata Kanté
- (Ivory Coast) Rebecca Elloh
- (Ivory Coast) Ines Nrehy
- (Kenya) Mwanalima Adam
- (Kenya) Enez Medeizi Mango
- (Mali) Djeneba Baradji
- (Mali) Bintou Koite
- (Morocco) Ibtissam Jraidi
- (Namibia) Lorraine Jossob
- (Nigeria) Rita Chikwelu
- (Nigeria) Osarenoma Igbinovia
- (Nigeria) Chioma Wogu
- (South Africa) Mamello Makhabane
- (South Africa) Nompumelelo Nyandeni
- (Tanzania) Donisia Daniel Minja
- (Tanzania) Mwanahamisi Omary
- (Tunisia) Ella Kaabachi
- (Tunisia) Sabrine Mamay
- (Tunisia) Imen Mchara
- (Zambia) Misozi Zulu
- (Zimbabwe) Daisy Kaitano
- (Zimbabwe) Emmculate Msipa
- (Zimbabwe) Samkelisiwe Zulu

Own goal

- (Algeria) Fatima Sekouane (against Kenya)

* includes a goal scored at Egypt vs. Libya match, which has no goal scorers references.
