= Niamien =

Niamien is both a given name and a surname. Notable people with the name include:

- Niamien Rodolph Amessan (born 1990), Ivorian footballer
- Sandrine Niamien (born 1994), Ivorian footballer
