= Football at the 2015 African Games – Women's tournament =

2015 African Games women's football tournament
Tournament details
- Host country: Republic of the Congo
- City: Brazzaville
- Dates: 6–18 September 2015
- Teams: 7 (from 1 confederation)
- Venues: 3 (in 1 host city)

Final positions
- Champions: Ghana (1st title)
- Runners-up: Cameroon
- Third place: Ivory Coast
- Fourth place: Nigeria

Tournament statistics
- Matches played: 13
- Goals scored: 28 (2.15 per match)
- Top scorer: (Nigeria) Desire Oparanozie (5 goals)

The 2015 African Games women's football tournament was the 4th edition of the African Games women's football tournament. The women's football tournament was held in Brazzaville, the Republic of the Congo between 6–18 September 2015 as part of the 2015 African Games. The tournament was open to full women's national teams (unlike the men's tournament, which was age-restricted).

== Qualification ==
Congo qualified automatically as hosts, while the remaining seven spots were determined by the qualifying rounds, which were organized by the Confederation of African Football (CAF) and took place from February to April 2015.

=== Qualified teams ===
The following eight teams qualified for the final tournament.

Team	Appearance	Previous best performance
Cameroon	3rd	Gold medal (2011)
Congo (hosts)	1st	Debut
Egypt	1st	Debut
Ghana	3rd	Silver medal (2011)
Ivory Coast	1st	Debut
Nigeria	3rd	Gold medal (2003, 2007)
South Africa	4th	Silver medal (2003, 2007)
Tanzania	2nd	Group stage (2011)

On 26 August 2015, the CAF announced that Egypt had withdrawn from the competition. Senegal, the team eliminated by Egypt in the final round, declined to replace them due to short notice. Therefore, only seven teams competed in the tournament, and Group B, where Egypt were drawn in, was composed of three teams only.

== Venues ==
A new 60,000 capacity stadium, Stade Municipal de Kintélé, was built for the 2015 African Games. The Stade Alphonse Massemba-Débat and Stade Kintélé 3 were also used.

== Group stage ==
The draw was held on 9 July 2015, 11:00 UTC+2, at the CAF Headquarters in Cairo, Egypt. The eight teams were drawn into two groups of four. For the draw, the hosts Congo were seeded in position A1 and the holders Cameroon were seeded in position B1. The remaining six teams were drawn from one pot to fill the other positions in the two groups.

The top two teams of each group advanced to the semi-finals.

All times were local, WAT (UTC+1).

=== Group A ===
Pos	Team	Pld	W	D	L	GF	GA	GD	Pts	Qualification
1	Ivory Coast	3	3	0	0	4	1	+3	9	Knockout stage
2	Nigeria	3	2	0	1	9	3	+6	6	Knockout stage
3	Tanzania	3	0	1	2	1	5	−4	1	
4	Congo (H)	3	0	1	2	2	7	−5	1	

Source: CAF
(H) Hosts
6 September 2015
17:00

Congo	1–5	Nigeria
Mabahou-Ngoma 61'	Report	Oparanozie 5', 15', 89'; Sunday 7'; Uchendu 90'

Stade Alphonse Massemba-Débat, Brazzaville
Referee: Marximina Bernardo (Angola)
6 September 2015
17:00

Tanzania	0–1	Ivory Coast
	Report	Niamien 48'

Stade Municipal de Kintélé, Brazzaville
Referee: Fatou Thioune (Senegal)

9 September 2015
17:00

Nigeria	3–0	Tanzania
Oparanozie 13', 46'; Sunday 51'	Report

Stade Alphonse Massemba-Débat, Brazzaville
Referee: Salma Mukansanga (Rwanda)
9 September 2015
17:00

Ivory Coast	1–0	Congo
Akaffou 38'	Report

Stade Municipal de Kintélé, Brazzaville
Referee: Maria Rivet (Mauritius)

12 September 2015
17:00

Congo	1–1	Tanzania
Mbondzo 45'	Report	Mafuru 53'

Stade Municipal de Kintélé, Brazzaville
Referee: Jeanne Ekoumou (Cameroon)
12 September 2015
17:00

Nigeria	1–2	Ivory Coast
Amanze 10'	Report	Elloh 45'; Nahi 77' (pen.)

Stade Alphonse Massemba-Débat, Brazzaville
Referee: Christine Ziga (Ghana)

=== Group B ===
Pos	Team	Pld	W	D	L	GF	GA	GD	Pts	Qualification
1	Cameroon	2	0	2	0	2	2	0	2	Knockout stage
2	Ghana	2	0	2	0	1	1	0	2 (Note: As Ghana and South Africa were tied on points, head-to-head record, total goal difference and total goals scored, a drawing of lots was held on 14 September 2015, 09:00 local time, to determine which team finished as runners-up of Group B, which was won by Ghana.)	Knockout stage
3	South Africa	2	0	2	0	1	1	0	2	
4	Egypt	0	0	0	0	0	0	0	0	Withdrew

Source: CAF
Notes:
7 September 2015
17:00

Cameroon	1–1	South Africa
Manie 88' (pen.)	Report	Smeda 71'

Stade Alphonse Massemba-Débat, Brazzaville
Referee: Neama Mohamed (Egypt)
7 September 2015
17:00

Ghana	Cancelled	Egypt
	Report

Stade Municipal de Kintélé, Brazzaville

10 September 2015
17:00

South Africa	0–0	Ghana
	Report

Stade Municipal de Kintélé, Brazzaville
Referee: Chancelle Ngakosso (Congo)
10 September 2015
17:00

Egypt	Cancelled	Cameroon
	Report

Stade Alphonse Massemba-Débat, Brazzaville

13 September 2015
14:00

Cameroon	1–1	Ghana
Akaba 54'	Report	Kobblah 32'

Stade Kintélé 3, Brazzaville
Referee: Aissatou Keita (Guinea)
13 September 2015
17:00

South Africa	Cancelled	Egypt
	Report

Stade Kintélé 3, Brazzaville

== Knockout stage ==
=== Bracket ===
Semi-finals
15 September – Brazzaville
Ivory Coast	0
Ghana	1
15 September – Brazzaville
Cameroon	2
Nigeria	1

Gold medal match
17 September – Brazzaville
Ghana	1
Cameroon	0
Bronze medal match
18 September – Brazzaville
Ivory Coast	2
Nigeria	1

=== Semi-finals ===
15 September 2015
15:00

Ivory Coast	0–1	Ghana
	Report	Suleman 15'

Stade Kintélé 3, Brazzaville
Referee: Salma Mukansanga (Rwanda)

15 September 2015
18:30

Cameroon	2–1	Nigeria
Abena 10'; Ngono Mani 14'	Report	Ebi 48'

Stade Kintélé 3, Brazzaville
Referee: Maria Rivet (Mauritius)

=== Bronze medal match ===
17 September 2015
18:00

Ivory Coast	2–1	Nigeria
N'Guessan 70'; F. Coulibaly 77'	Report	Ihezuo 53'

Stade Alphonse Massemba-Débat, Brazzaville
Referee: Fatou Thioune (Senegal)

=== Gold medal match ===
18 September 2015
15:00

Ghana	1–0	Cameroon
Boakye 88'	Report

Stade Alphonse Massemba-Débat, Brazzaville
Referee: Marximina Bernardo (Angola)

== Final ranking ==
Pos	Team	Pld	W	D	L	GF	GA	GD	Pts	Final result
1st place, gold medalist(s)	Ghana	4	2	2	0	3	1	+2	8	Gold Medal
2nd place, silver medalist(s)	Cameroon	4	1	2	1	4	4	0	5	Silver Medal
3rd place, bronze medalist(s)	Ivory Coast	5	4	0	1	6	3	+3	12	Bronze Medal
4	Nigeria	5	2	0	3	11	7	+4	6	Fourth place
5	South Africa	2	0	2	0	1	1	0	2	Eliminated in group stage
6	Tanzania	3	0	1	2	1	5	−4	1	Eliminated in group stage
7	Congo (H)	3	0	1	2	2	7	−5	1	Eliminated in group stage
8	Egypt	0	0	0	0	0	0	0	0	Withdrew

Source: rsssf
(H) Hosts

== Goalscorers ==
5 goals

- (Nigeria) Desire Oparanozie

2 goals

- (Nigeria) Esther Sunday

1 goal

- (Cameroon) Ninon Abena
- (Cameroon) Henriette Akaba
- (Cameroon) Christine Manie
- (Cameroon) Madeleine Ngono Mani
- (Republic of the Congo) Flore Mabahou-Ngoma
- (Republic of the Congo) Dedina Mbondzo
- (Ghana) Hillia Kobblah
- (Ghana) Portia Boakye
- (Ghana) Samira Suleman
- (Ivory Coast) Rita Akaffou
- (Ivory Coast) Fatou Coulibaly
- (Ivory Coast) Rebecca Elloh
- (Ivory Coast) Josée Nahi
- (Ivory Coast) Ange N'Guessan
- (Ivory Coast) Sandrine Niamien
- (Nigeria) Mercy Amanze
- (Nigeria) Onome Ebi
- (Nigeria) Chinwendu Ihezuo
- (Nigeria) Chinaza Uchendu
- (South Africa) Leandra Smeda
- (Tanzania) Shelder Mafuru

== See also ==
- Football at the 2015 African Games – Men's tournament
