= Faiza Ibrahim =

Ghanaian international footballer (born 1990)

Personal information
- Full name: Faiza Ibrahim
- Date of birth: March 22, 1990 (age 36)
- Place of birth: Ghana
- Height: 1.70 m (5 ft 7 in)
- Position: Forward

Team information
- Current team: Police Accra

Senior career*
Years	Team	Apps	(Gls)
- Police Accra

International career
2008–2010	Ghana U20		
2008–	Ghana		
- * Club domestic league appearances and goals

Faiza Ibrahim (born March 22, 1990) is a Ghanaian international footballer. She plays as a forward.

She scored in a 3–0 win against Mali in a 2012 African Women's Championship qualification match. She scored in a 3–0 win against Ethiopia in a 2014 African Women's Championship qualification match. She was on the Ghana squad for the 2014 African Women's Championship. She was left off the Ghana squad in July 2015 due to injury. She was on the Ghana squad for the 2015 African Games.
