= Edoho =

Edoho is a surname. Notable people with the surname include:

- Blessing Edoho (born 1992), Nigerian footballer
- Frank Edoho (born 1972), Nigerian TV host, filmmaker, and photographer
