= Cecile Esmei Amari =

Ivorian association football player

Personal information
- Full name: Cecile Esmei Amari
- Date of birth: 20 November 1991 (age 34)
- Place of birth: Treichville, Abidjan, Ivory Coast
- Position: Midfielder

Team information
- Current team: Ataşehir Belediyespor
- Number: 7

Senior career*
Years	Team	Apps	(Gls)
2009–2012	AS Jeanne d'Arc de Treichville		
2012–2013	Raja Haroda Casablanca		
2013–	Wydad AC		
2014–	→ZFK Spartak Subotica		
2019–	Ataşehir Belediyespor	11	(7)

International career^{‡}
- Ivory Coast
- * Club domestic league appearances and goals as of 8 March 2020 ‡ National team caps and goals as of 11 october 2014 (before the 2014 African Women's Championship)

Cecile Esmei Amari (born 20 November 1991) is an Ivorian footballer who plays as a midfielder for the Ivory Coast women's national football team. She was part of the team at the 2014 African Women's Championship and 2015 FIFA Women's World Cup. On club level, she plays for Ataşehir Belediyespor in the 2019-20 Turkish Women's First Football League.

She played in Morocco in 2012 for Raja Haroda Casablanca. In 2013, she was with Wydad AC in the same country. She was loaned out to the Serbian team ZFK Spartak Subotica in 2014.

== See also ==
- List of Ivory Coast women's international footballers
