= Dhekra Gomri =

Tunisian footballer

Personal information
- Place of birth: Tunisia
- Position: Right back

Team information
- Current team: AS Banque de l'Habitat

Senior career*
Years	Team	Apps	(Gls)
- UST
- AS Banque de l'Habitat

International career^{‡}
2009–	Tunisia	4+	(1+)
2011	United Arab Emirates	1+	(0)
- * Club domestic league appearances and goals ‡ National team caps and goals as of 14 February 2014.

Dhekra Gomri (Arabic: ذكرى جومري) is a Tunisian footballer who plays as a right back for AS Banque de l'Habitat and the Tunisia women's national team.

== Club career ==
Gomri has played for UST and AS Banque de l'Habitat in Tunisia.

== International career ==
Gomri capped for Tunisia at senior level during two Africa Women Cup of Nations qualifications (2012 and 2014).

=== International goals ===
Scores and results list Tunisia's goal tally first

No.	Date	Venue	Opponent	Score	Result	Competition	Ref.
1	14 February 2014	Al Ahly Training Centre, 6th October City, Egypt	Egypt	2–0	3–0	2014 African Women's Championship qualification	

== See also ==
- List of Tunisia women's international footballers
