= Lilian Adera =

Kenyan footballer (born 1994)

Personal information
- Full name: Lilian Odaa Adera
- Date of birth: 7 May 1994 (age 32)
- Place of birth: Kisumu, Kenya
- Position: Defender

Senior career*
Years	Team	Apps	(Gls)
- Kenya Methodist University
- Vihiga Queens
- KISPED Queens

International career
	Kenya	16+	
- * Club domestic league appearances and goals

Lilian Odaa Adera (born 7 May 1994) is a Kenyan footballer who plays as a defender. She has been a member of the Kenya women's national team.

== Club career ==
Adera started her club career at Kenya Methodist University, leading them to a FKF Women's Division One title. She then joined Vihiga Queens and captained the team to three straight Kenyan Women's Premier League titles from 2017 to 2019. Adera moved to KISPED Queens next, where she was a player-coach.

== International career ==
Adera capped for Kenya at senior level during the 2018 Africa Women Cup of Nations qualification.

=== International goals ===
Scores and results list Kenya's goal tally first

No.	Date	Venue	Opponent	Score	Result	Competition	Ref.
1	4 April 2018	Machakos Stadium, Machakos, Kenya	Uganda	1–0	1–0	2018 Africa Women Cup of Nations qualification	

== See also ==
- List of Kenya women's international footballers
