= Madjoh Dosso =

Ivorian footballer

Personal information
- Full name: Salimata Madjoh Dosso
- Date of birth: 23 July 1986 (age 40)
- Place of birth: Abidjan, Ivory Coast
- Height: 1.70 m (5 ft 7 in)
- Position: Midfielder

Youth career
- Juventus de Yopougon

Senior career*
Years	Team	Apps	(Gls)
2004–2007	CF Etoile du Matin		
2008–201?	Onze Sœurs de Gagnoa		

International career^{‡}
2011–201?	Ivory Coast	1+	(0+)
- * Club domestic league appearances and goals ‡ National team caps and goals as of 1 November 2012

Salimata Madjoh Dosso (born 26 August 1986), known as Madjoh Dosso, is an Ivorian former footballer who played as a midfielder. She has been a member of the Ivory Coast women's national team.

== International career ==
Dosso capped for Ivory Coast at senior level during the 2012 African Women's Championship.

== See also ==
- List of Ivory Coast women's international footballers
