= Sakhla Sylla =

Senegalese footballer

Personal information
- Date of birth: 22 November 1989 (age 36)
- Place of birth: Fatick, Senegal
- Height: 1.77 m (5 ft 10 in)
- Position: Midfielder

Senior career*
Years	Team	Apps	(Gls)
- Etoile du Sine
- Sirènes
- US Parcelles Assainies Dakar

International career^{‡}
2014	Senegal	2	(1)
- * Club domestic league appearances and goals ‡ National team caps and goals as of 8 June 2014

Sakhla Sylla (born 22 November 1989) is a Senegalese footballer who plays as a midfielder. She has been a member of the Senegal women's national team.

== Club career ==
Sylla has played for Etoile du Sine, Sirènes Grand Yoff and US Parcelles Assainies Dakar in Senegal.

== International career ==
Sylla capped for Senegal at senior level during the 2014 Africa Women Cup of Nations qualification.
