= Michela Zroho =

Ivorian footballer (died 2019)

Personal information
- Full name: Michela Andrienne Zroho
- Date of death: January 2019
- Place of death: Tunisia

Senior career*
Years	Team	Apps	(Gls)
- Juventus de Yopougon

International career^{‡}
2002	Ivory Coast	2+	(0+)

Managerial career
- Ivory Coast Women (assistant coach)
- Juventus de Yopougon
- * Club domestic league appearances and goals ‡ National team caps and goals as of 24 August 2002.

Michela Andrienne Zroho (died 15 January 2019) was an Ivorian football player and manager. She capped for the Ivory Coast women's national team.

== Club career ==
Zroho played for Juventus de Yopougon in Ivory Coast.

== International career ==
Zroho capped for Ivory Coast at senior level during the 2002 African Women's Championship qualification.

== Managerial career ==
Zroho been the assistant coach of the Ivory Coast women's national team and the head coach of Juventus de Yopougon in Ivory Coast.

== Death ==
In mid-2018, Zroho announced to the president of Juventus de Yopougon, Yves Gossé, that she would go to Ghana to improve as a football manager. She eventually ended up going to Tunisia. On 15 January 2019, she was found dead in her room. According to witnesses to the event, she died from asphyxiation in her sleep after forgetting to turn off the firewood, which she had lit due to the low temperatures that were there at that time.

== See also ==
- List of Ivory Coast women's international footballers
