= Violet Bepete =

Zimbabwean footballer (born 1990)

Personal information
- Date of birth: 13 July 1990 (age 36)
- Position: Midfielder

Senior career*
Years	Team	Apps	(Gls)
- Aces Youth Academy

International career
- Zimbabwe
- * Club domestic league appearances and goals

Violet Bepete (born 13 July 1990) is a Zimbabwean footballer who plays as a midfielder. She has been a member of the Zimbabwe women's national team.

== Club career ==
Bepete has played for Aces Youth Academy in Zimbabwe.

== International career ==
Bepete capped for Zimbabwe at senior level during the 2014 African Women's Championship qualification.
