= Clémentine Touré =

Ivorian football player and manager (born 1977)

Personal information
- Date of birth: 21 March 1977 (age 49)
- Place of birth: Ferkessédougou, Ivory Coast

International career
Years	Team	Apps	(Gls)
1995–2002	Ivory Coast	22	

Managerial career
- 2006: Koumassi Amazons
- 2006–2008: Águilas Verdes de Guadalupe
- 2008–2010: Equatorial Guinea
- 2010–2024: Ivory Coast

Clémentine Touré (born 21 March 1977) is an Ivorian football manager and former footballer who recently coached the Ivory Coast women's national football team. She has also previously coached Equatorial Guinea women's national football team.

== Personal life ==
At elementary school, Touré decided she enjoyed playing football. Her father played professional football, and her two brothers played football, too. Touré has a degree in physical education.

== Playing career ==
As a player, Touré played for a number of Ivorian clubs, as well as in Ghana, where she won three league titles. She made 22 appearances for the Ivory Coast women's national football team between 1995 and 2002.

== Coaching career ==
Touré's coaching career began in 2004 as an assistant coach at Jeanne d'Arc Treichville. In 2006, she was appointed head coach of the Koumassi Amazons, with whom she won the Ivorian League. The press questioned her appointment as head coach, primarily due to her gender. In 2006, Touré moved to Equatorial Guinea to coach Águilas Verdes de Guadalupe. In 2008, she became head coach of the Equatorial Guinea women's national football team. During her reign, the team won the 2008 African Women's Championship, and came second at the 2010 event, losing to Nigeria in the final.

In 2010, Touré was appointed head coach of the Ivory Coast women's national football team. During her reign as head coach, the team qualified for the 2012 African Women's Championship, where they finished third overall, the 2014 African Women's Championship, and the 2015 FIFA Women's World Cup. Touré was one of eight female head coaches at the 24-team 2015 World Cup. Prior to the tournament, the national team had never played a match outside Africa, and in their first match, Ivory Coast lost a record 10–0 to Germany. Touré has recruited multiple professional footballers who were born to Ivorian parents outside of the Ivory Coast.

At The Best FIFA Football Awards 2018, Touré was on the panel to award The Best FIFA Women's Player and The Best FIFA Women's Coach awards. During the COVID-19 pandemic, Touré supported a FIFA and World Health Organization initiative against domestic violence during lockdowns. In 2020, she became a supporter of the joint FIFA and United Nations Office on Drugs and Crime "Recover with Integrity" campaign against corruption in football.

Touré's Ivory Coast team failed to qualify for the 2022 Africa Women Cup of Nations, after losing in qualifying to Nigeria. It was the third consecutive AFCON that they had failed to qualify for.

== See also ==
- List of Ivory Coast women's international footballers
