= Binta Diakhaté =

Senegalese footballer

Personal information
- Date of birth: 10 December 1994 (age 31)
- Place of birth: Rufisque, Senegal
- Position: Forward

Senior career*
Years	Team	Apps	(Gls)
- Lycée Ameth Fall
2017	Metz	4	(0)
2017–2019	Metz ESAP	40	(7)
2020	Nancy	5	(0)
2021	Yzeure	5	(1)

International career^{‡}
2016	Senegal	2	(1)
- * Club domestic league appearances and goals as of 10 October 2021 ‡ National team caps and goals as of 19 March 2016

Binta Diakhaté (born 10 December 1994) is a Senegalese footballer who plays as a forward. She has been a member of the Senegal women's national team.

== Club career ==
Diakhaté has played for Lycée Ameth Fall in Senegal and for FC Metz, Metz ESAP, AS Nancy Lorraine and FF Yzeure Allier Auvergne in France.

== International career ==
Diakhaté capped for Senegal at senior level during the 2016 Africa Women Cup of Nations qualification.
