= Rolande Tokpoledo =

Ivorian footballer

Personal information
- Full name: Houane Rolande Tokpoledo
- Date of birth: 15 December 1992 (age 33)
- Height: 1.70 m (5 ft 7 in)
- Position: Defensive midfielder

Senior career*
Years	Team	Apps	(Gls)
- Amazonne de Koumassi
- CMLFF

International career
- Ivory Coast
- * Club domestic league appearances and goals

Houane Rolande Tokpoledo (born 15 December 1992), known as Rolande Tokpoledo, is an Ivorian footballer who plays as a defensive midfielder. She has been a member of the Ivory Coast women's national team. She is nicknamed Tiotine, honoring her compatriot, late male footballer Cheick Tioté, who played at the same position of her.

== International career ==
Tokpoledo capped for Ivory Coast at senior level during the 2018 Africa Women Cup of Nations qualification.

== See also ==
- List of Ivory Coast women's international footballers
