= Armelle Lago =

French-born Ivorian footballer (born 1986)

Personal information
- Date of birth: 5 January 1986 (age 40)
- Place of birth: Ivry-sur-Seine, France
- Height: 1.68 m (5 ft 6 in)
- Position: Forward

Senior career*
Years	Team	Apps	(Gls)
2000–2002	Saint-Maur		
2002–2006	Compiègne	27+	(2+)
2006–2007	Paris Saint-Germain	2	(0)
2007–2009	Bagneux	35	(15)
2009–2010	Aulnat	5	(5)
2012	Estrées-Saint-Denis		
2012–2014	Orléans	6+	(1+)
2014–2015	Compiègne	15	(4)
2015–2016	Tremblay	1	(0)

International career
	Ivory Coast	1+	(0+)
- * Club domestic league appearances and goals

Armelle Lago (born 5 January 1986) is a French-born Ivorian former footballer who played as a forward. She has been a member of the Ivory Coast women's national team.

== International career ==
Lago capped for Ivory Coast at senior level during the 2008 African Women's Championship qualification (second round).

== See also ==
- List of Ivory Coast women's international footballers
