= Noria Sosala =

Zambian footballer (born 1988)

Personal information
- Date of birth: 25 December 1988 (age 37)
- Position: Forward

Senior career*
Years	Team	Apps	(Gls)
- National Assembly F.C.

International career^{‡}
- Zambia
Medal record
Representing Zambia
Women's Africa Cup of Nations
Third place	2022 Morocco
- * Club domestic league appearances and goals ‡ National team caps and goals as of 11 october 2014 (before the 2014 African Women's Championship)

Noria Sosala (born 25 December 1988) is a Zambian footballer who plays as a forward for the Zambia women's national team. She was part of the team at the 2014 African Women's Championship. On club level she played for National Assembly F.C. in Zambia.
