= Águilas Verdes de Guadalupe =

Águilas
- Full name: Águilas Verdes de Guadalupe
- Ground: Equatorial Guinea
- League: Equatoguinean Premier League
Away colours

Águilas Verdes de Guadalupe is an Equatoguinean football club who plays in the Equatoguinean Premier League.

The club is based in Bata, Equatorial Guinea in Litoral Province (Equatorial Guinea).

== Kits ==
The club plays in green kits
