= Litšeoane Maloro =

Mosotho footballer

Team information
- Current team: University of the Western Cape

Senior career*
Years	Team	Apps	(Gls)
2019-2022	Bloemfontein Celtic Ladies		
2022-2024	Royal AM		
2025-	University of the Western Cape		

International career
- Lesotho
- * Club domestic league appearances and goals

Litšeoane Maloro is a Mosotho footballer who plays as a striker for SAFA Women's League club UWC Ladies and the Lesotho women's national football team.

== Club career ==
In 2019, Maloro signed for South African side Bloemfontein Celtic, where she was described as "hit the ground running at her new club scoring important goals before football activities were suspended due to the Corona virus".

== International career ==
Maloro played for the Lesotho women's national football team, where she was regarded as one of the team's most important players. She captained them.

== Style of play ==
Maloro has operated as a striker and as a central defender.

== Personal life ==
Nicknamed "Kamoli", Maloro is a native of Abia Community, Lesotho.
