= Binta Diakité =

Ivorian footballer

Personal information
- Full name: Binta Diakité
- Date of birth: 7 May 1988 (age 38)
- Place of birth: Yopougon, Abidjan, Ivory Coast
- Height: 1.60 m (5 ft 3 in)
- Position: Midfielder

Senior career*
Years	Team	Apps	(Gls)
?	?		
2018	FC Minsk	10	(18)
2022–2023	Soyaux	23	(1)
2023–2024	ALC Longvic		

International career^{‡}
2006–2015	Ivory Coast	23	(2)
- * Club domestic league appearances and goals ‡ National team caps and goals as of 11:55, 16 June 2015 (UTC)

Binta Diakité (born 7 May 1988) is an Ivorian former professional footballer who played as a midfielder. She was part of the Ivorian squad for the 2015 FIFA Women's World Cup.

== See also ==
- List of Ivory Coast women's international footballers
