= List of Ivory Coast women's international footballers =

This is a list of Ivory Coast women's international footballers who have played for the Ivory Coast women's national football team.

== Players ==
Name	Caps	Goals	National team years	Club(s)
Jessica Aby	1+	0+	–	(Spain) DUX Logroño
Espérance Agbo	1+	0+	–	(Ivory Coast) Juventus de Yopougon
Sophie Aguie	1+	0+	–	Unknown
Rita Akaffou	1+	0+	–	Unknown
Ange Atsé	1+	0+	–	Unknown
Rachel Bancouly	1+	0+	–	Unknown
Huguette Bohoussou	1+	0+	–	Unknown
Nadège Cissé	1+	0+	–	(Belarus) Dinamo Minsk
Djelika Coulibaly	1+	0+	–	Unknown
Fatou Coulibaly	1+	0+	–	(Spain) DUX Logroño
Binta Diakité	1+	0+	–	(France) Soyaux
Mariam Diakité	1+	0+	–	(Ivory Coast) Juventus de Yopougon
Cynthia Djohore	1+	0+	–	(Ivory Coast) Onze Sœurs de Gagnoa
Madjoh Dosso	1+	0+	–	Unknown
Rebecca Elloh	1+	0+	–	(Spain) DUX Logroño
Cecile Amari	1+	0+	–	Unknown
Nadège Essoh	1+	0+	–	Unknown
Lynda Gauzé	1+	0+	–	(Ivory Coast) Juventus de Yopougon
Jeanne Gnago	1+	0+	–	Unknown
Rebecca Guehai	1+	0+	–	(Spain) DUX Logroño
Aminata Haidara	1+	0+	–	Unknown
Raymonde Kacou	1+	0+	–	(Equatorial Guinea) Malabo Kings
Bernadette Kakounan	1+	0+	–	(Spain) FF La Solana
Nadège Koffi	1+	0+	–	Unknown
Inès Konan	1+	0+	–	(Ivory Coast) Inter d'Abidjan
Sandrine Kouadio	1+	0+	–	Unknown
Marieta Kouassi	1+	0+	–	Unknown
Rosemonde Kouassi	1+	0+	–	(Ivory Coast) Africa
Michaela Koutouan	1+	0+	–	Unknown
Nina Kpaho	1+	0+	–	(Turkey) Fenerbahçe
Priscille Kreto	1+	0+	–	(Democratic Republic of the Congo) TP Mazembe
Armelle Lago	1+	0+	–	Unknown
Christine Lohoues	1+	0+	–	(Morocco) ASDCT
Ange N'Guessan	1+	0+	–	(Spain) Granadilla
Josée Nahi	1+	0+	–	Unknown
Sandrine Niamien	1+	0+	–	(Ivory Coast) Inter d'Abidjan
Sabine Nogbou	1+	0+	–	Unknown
Lydie Saki	1+	0+	–	Unknown
Ettien Sasso	1+	0+	–	Unknown
Mariam Sidibé	1+	0+	–	Unknown
Fernande Tchetche	1+	0+	–	(Ivory Coast) Inter d'Abidjan
Dominique Thiamale	1+	0+	–	Unknown
Inès Tia	1+	0+	–	(South Korea) Gyeongju KHNP
Rolande Tokpoledo	1+	0+	–	Unknown
Clémentine Touré	22	0+	1995–2002	Retired
Marie Claire Yassi	?	?	–	Unknown
Michela Zroho	2+	0+	2002	Deceased

== See also ==
- Ivory Coast women's national football team
