= Adama Tamba =

Gambian footballer (born 1998)

Personal information
- Date of birth: 29 August 1998 (age 28)
- Place of birth: Banjul, The Gambia
- Height: 1.59 m (5 ft 3 in)
- Position: Forward

Team information
- Current team: Rodez
- Number: 9

Senior career*
Years	Team	Apps	(Gls)
2015–2022	Red Scorpions	114	(165)
2021–2022	→ Grenoble (loan)	9	(4)
2022–2024	Cannes	25	(24)
2024–2025	Rodez	17	(5)
2025	Monaco	4	(0)

International career
2012	Gambia U17		
2015–	Gambia	3	(5)
- * Club domestic league appearances and goals

Adama Tamba (born 29 August 1998) is a Gambian professional footballer who plays as a forward for club Monaco and the Gambia national team.

== Early life ==
Adama and her sister Awa were born in Banjul, and grew up at the SOS Children's Village in Serekunda's Bakoteh neighborhood, outside of Banjul. The sisters lost their mother at a young age, while their father, a farmer, lived in the hinterlands of the Gambia. Adama began playing football with her male counterparts in primary and high school.

== Club career ==
In the 2016–17 season, Tamba scored fifty goals in eleven games in the second division, helping Red Scorpions return to the first tier of women's football in the Gambia. In the 2017–18 season, she scored fifty-one goals in ten games to help Red Scorpions move out of the relegation zone in the first division. As of May 2020, she had 165 goals in 114 league games to her name. Tamba has stated that she is "addicted to scoring goals". Her knack for scoring earned her trials with French clubs Paris Saint-Germain and Lyon in 2018.

In September 2021, Tamba signed for Division 2 Féminine club Grenoble on a one-year loan. In the 2022–23 season, she joined Régional 1 Féminine club Cannes.

== International career ==
Tamba made her debut for the Gambia U17 national team in a FIFA U-17 Women's World Cup qualifier against Sierra Leone in 2012. She would help the Gambia eventually qualify for the 2012 FIFA U-17 Women's World Cup in Azerbaijan. Tamba played in all three of her nation's matches at the tournament, all of which ended in defeat.

In March 2020, Tamba scored four goals for the Gambia national team in a 5–2 win over Guinea-Bissau in the WAFU Zone A Women's Cup. The Gambia would go on to suffer elimination in the group stage of the competition. As of May 2020, Tamba had eighteen goals in twelve matches for the Scorpions. Mariama Sowe, coach of the Scorpions, stated that Adama scored in "almost every game", while her sister Awa would "assist most of her goals".

== Honours ==
Cannes

- Régional 1 Féminine: 2022–23
