= Samira Suleman =

Ghanaian footballer

Personal information
- Full name: Samira Suleman
- Date of birth: August 16, 1991 (age 35)
- Place of birth: Ghana
- Height: 1.60 m (5 ft 3 in)
- Position: Forward

Team information
- Current team: Víkingur Ólafsvík

College career
| Years | Team | Apps | (Gls) |
| 2010–2011 | Robert Morris Eagles | | |

Senior career*
| Years | Team | Apps | (Gls) |
| | Hasaacas Ladies | 20 | (15) |
| 2015 | →Víkingur Ólafsvík (loan) | 10 | (11) |
| 2016 | Víkingur Ólafsvík | | |

International career
| 2010 | Ghana U20 | | |
| 2014– | Ghana | | |
- * Club domestic league appearances and goals

Samira Suleman (born August 16, 1991) is a Ghanaian international footballer who plays as a forward in Iceland for Víkingur Ólafsvík.

== Club career ==
=== Iceland ===
Suleman came to Víkingur Ólafsvík in 2015 and made 10 appearances during the 2015 season.

== International career ==
She scored in a 2–0 win against Ethiopia in a 2014 African Women's Championship qualification match. She was on the Ghana squad for the 2014 African Women's Championship. She scored in Ghana's 1–0 win over Ivory Coast in the semifinals of the 2015 African Games. In April 2016 she scored Brace against Tunisia which helped the Black Queens qualify for the 2016 African Women Championship in Cameroon.

== Nominations ==
She was Nominated by the Sports Writers Association of Ghana in 2016.

== International goals ==
| No. | Date | Venue | Opponent | Score | Result | Competition |
|---|---|---|---|---|---|---|
| 1. | 21 March 2015 | Accra Sports Stadium, Accra, Ghana | Zimbabwe | 2–0 | 2–1 | 2015 African Games qualification |
| 2. | 1 August 2015 | Accra Sports Stadium, Accra, Ghana | Cameroon | 1–0 | 2–2 | 2015 CAF Women's Olympic Qualifying Tournament |
| 3. | 15 September 2015 | Stade Kintélé 3, Brazzaville, Congo | Ivory Coast | 1–0 | 1–0 | 2015 African Games |
| 4. | 6 April 2016 | Stade Oued Ellil, Oued Ellil, Tunisia | Tunisia | 1–1 | 2–1 | 2016 Women's Africa Cup of Nations qualification |
| 5. | 12 April 2016 | Accra Sports Stadium, Accra, Ghana | Tunisia | 1–0 | 4–0 | 2016 Women's Africa Cup of Nations qualification |
| 6. | 12 April 2016 | Accra Sports Stadium, Accra, Ghana | Tunisia | 4–0 | 4–0 | 2016 Women's Africa Cup of Nations qualification |

== Ambassadorial Role ==
On March 14, 2018, Suleman was appointed as an ambassador by World Vision International to aid in the eradication of Early Child Marriage in the Northern Region and the rest of Northern Ghana.
