= Assia Sidhoum =

Tunisian-born Algerian footballer (born 1996)

Personal information
- Date of birth: 25 December 1996 (age 29)
- Place of birth: Tunis, Tunisia
- Position: Midfielder

Team information
- Current team: ASPTT Albi
- Number: 20

College career
Years	Team	Apps	(Gls)
2015–2016	Niagara Purple Eagles	25	(4)
2017–2018	UQAM Citadins	-	(-)

Senior career*
Years	Team	Apps	(Gls)
2018–	ASPTT Albi	12	(0)

International career^{‡}
2018–	Algeria	2	(0)
- * Club domestic league appearances and goals ‡ National team caps and goals as of 20 June 2019

Assia Sidhoum (born 25 December 1996) is an Algerian international footballer who plays as a midfielder for the Algeria women's national football team. She competed for Algeria at the 2018 Africa Women Cup of Nations, playing in two matches.

Born in Tunisia to Algerian parents, Sidhoum moved to Canada with her family when she was 18 months old.
