= Ninon Abena =

Cameroonian footballer (born 1994)

Personal information
- Full name: Therese Ninon Abena
- Date of birth: 5 September 1994 (age 32)
- Height: 1.68 m (5 ft 6 in)
- Position: Midfielder

Senior career*
| Years | Team | Apps | (Gls) |
| ?–2019 | Louves Minproff | ? | (?) |
| 2019–2020 | ACF Torino | ? | (?) |

International career^{‡}
| 2015– | Cameroon | 8 | (2) |
- * Club domestic league appearances and goals as of 28 July 2020 ‡ National team caps and goals as of 18:40, 14 March 2021 (UTC)

Therese Ninon Abena (born 5 September 1994), known as Ninon Abena, is a Cameroonian footballer who plays as a midfielder for the Cameroon women's national team.

== Domestic career ==
Abena played for Cameroon top division team Louves Minproff, before signing for Italian Serie C club ACF Torino in November 2019. She signed a one-year contract. She missed a Cameroon qualification game for the 2020 Summer Olympics in order to finalise her club deal.

== International career ==
Abena was part of the Cameroon squad at the 2015 FIFA Women's World Cup. At the time of the squad announcement, she had made 3 appearances. She didn't make an appearance at the tournament. She played in the final of the 2015 African Games, which Cameroon lost to Ghana. She was included in the squad for the 2018 Africa Women Cup of Nations, and scored two goals as Cameroon beat Mali 4–2 in the third-placed playoff. The result meant that Cameroon qualified for the 2019 FIFA Women's World Cup in France. She made two appearances at the 2019 World Cup.

== Personal life ==
Abena is the youngest of 20 siblings. One of her older sisters was unhappy when Abena started playing football.
