= Sara Mohamed =

Egyptian footballer (born 1990)

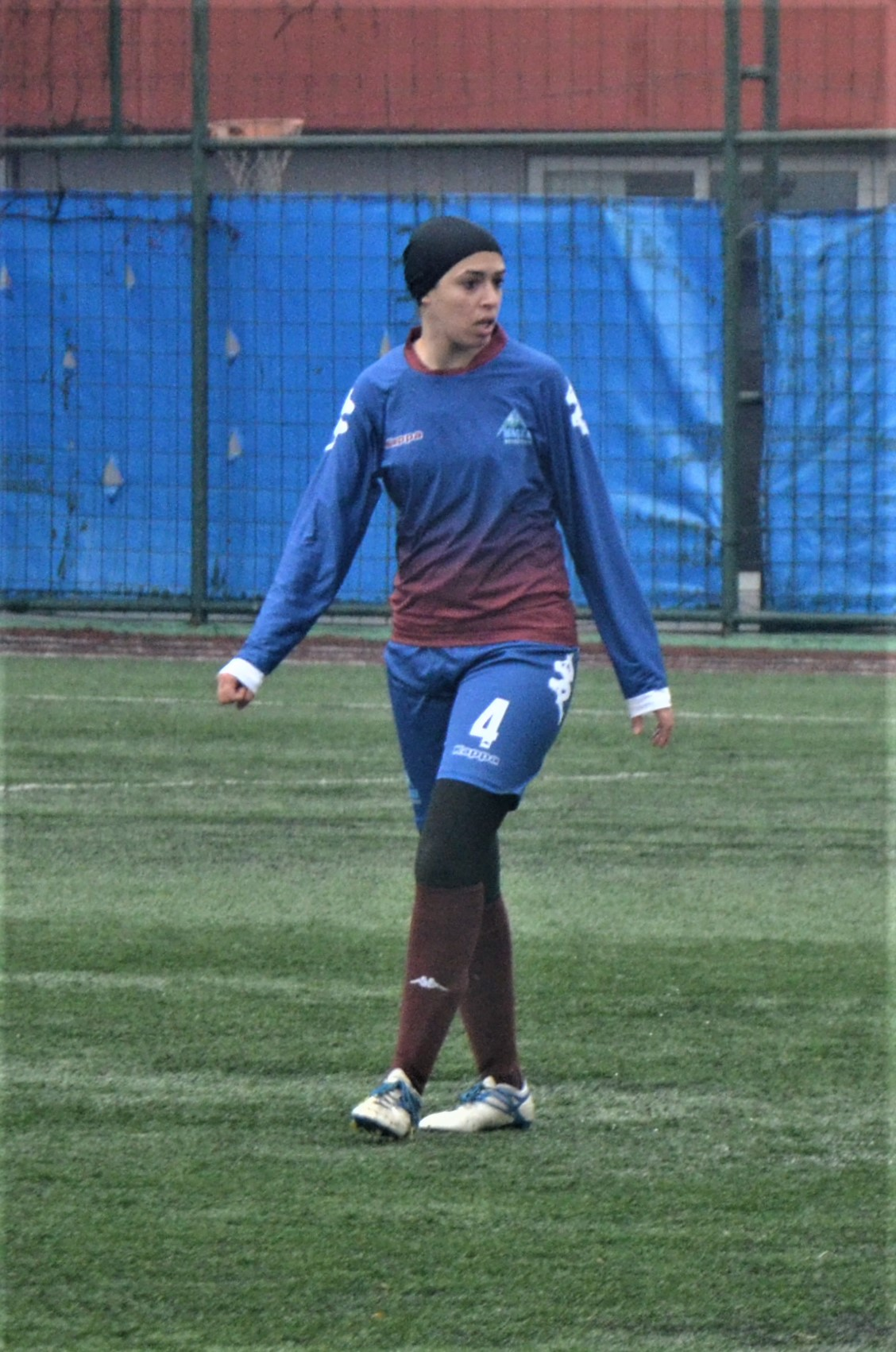
- Sara Mohamed playing for Trabzon İdmanocağı (December 2017)

Personal information
- Full name: Sarah Abdullah Abdul Latif Mohammed
- Date of birth: 6 July 1990 (age 36)
- Place of birth: Cairo, Egypt
- Position: Defender

Senior career*
Years	Team	Apps	(Gls)
- Wadi Degla SC
2017–2018	Trabzon İdmanocağı	7	(0)
2022–2023	Al-Ittihad		
2023–	Al-Suqoor		

International career
- Egypt
- * Club domestic league appearances and goals as of 13 January 2018

Sarah Abdullah Abdul Latif Mohammed (Arabic: سارة عبد الله عبد اللطيف محمد, born 6 July 1990), commonly known as Sara Mohamed, is an Egyptian football defender. She is a member of the Egyptian national team.

Sara Mohamed was born in Cairo, Egypt on 6 July 1990.

== Playing career ==
=== Club ===
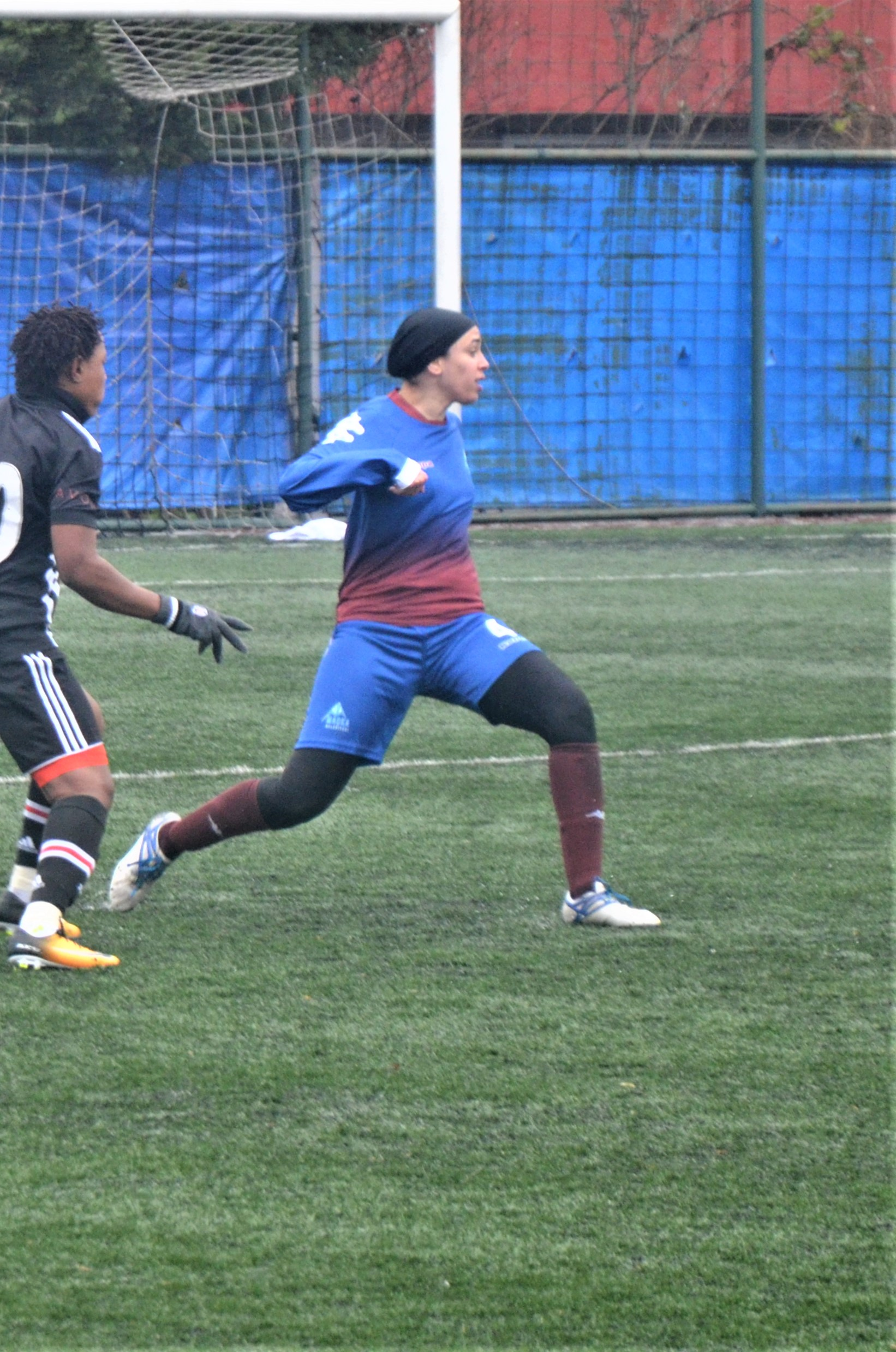
Sara Mohamed playing for Trabzon İdmanocağı in the away match against Beşiktaş J.K. (black/white) in the 2017–18 Turkish Women's First League.

Mohamed played for the Cairo-based Wadi Degla SC before she moved in November 2017 to Turkey to join Trabzon İdmanocağı, who play in the Turkish Women's First Football League.

=== International ===
Mohamed appeared for the Egypt women's national football team at the 2016 Africa Women Cup of Nations held in Cameroon.
