= Mariam Diakité =

Ivorian footballer (born 1995)

Personal information
- Date of birth: 11 April 1995 (age 31)
- Place of birth: Ouragahio, Ivory Coast
- Height: 1.69 m (5 ft 6 1/2 in)
- Position: Defender

Team information
- Current team: Toulouse
- Number: 5

Senior career*
Years	Team	Apps	(Gls)
2019	Neman Grodno	17	(4)
2022–2024	Fleury 91	39	(0)
2025–2026	Fenerbahçe	16	(0)
2026–	Toulouse	9	(0)

International career^{‡}
	Ivory Coast	12	(0)
- * Club domestic league appearances and goals as of 24 May 2026 ‡ National team caps and goals as of 11:29, 16 June 2015 (UTC)

Mariam Diakité (born 11 April 1995) is an Ivorian professional footballer who plays as a defender for Toulouse and the Ivory Coast women's national team. She was part of the Ivorian squad for the 2015 FIFA Women's World Cup.

== Personal life ==
Mariam Diakité was born in Ouragahio, Gôh, south-central Ivory Coast on 11 April 1995. She spent her childhood in Abobo, a commune of Abidjan.

She left school because of her passion for football in her childhood.

== Club career ==
Diakité is 1.69 m (5 ft 6 1/2 in) tall, and plays in the defender position.

In the years 2009–2010 at the age of 14–15, she played in the local women's football club ES Abobo. She then went abroad to play in Belarus for Neman Grodno in the Premier League. Returned home, she was with Juventus de Yopougon.

=== Fleury 91 ===
Discovered through videos, she was helped by the Ivorian coach Clémentine Touré for her remotely selection into the French club Fleury 91 in Fleury-Mérogis. In September 2021, she went to France, and joined the club to play in the Première Ligue on a two-year contract.

=== Fenerbahçe ===
In January 2025, Diakité moved to Turkey, and signed a one-and-half-year deal with Fenerbahçe from Istanbul to start playing in the second half of the 2024-25 Super League season.

== See also ==
- List of Ivory Coast women's international footballers
