= Engy Sayed =

Egyptian footballer (born 1986)

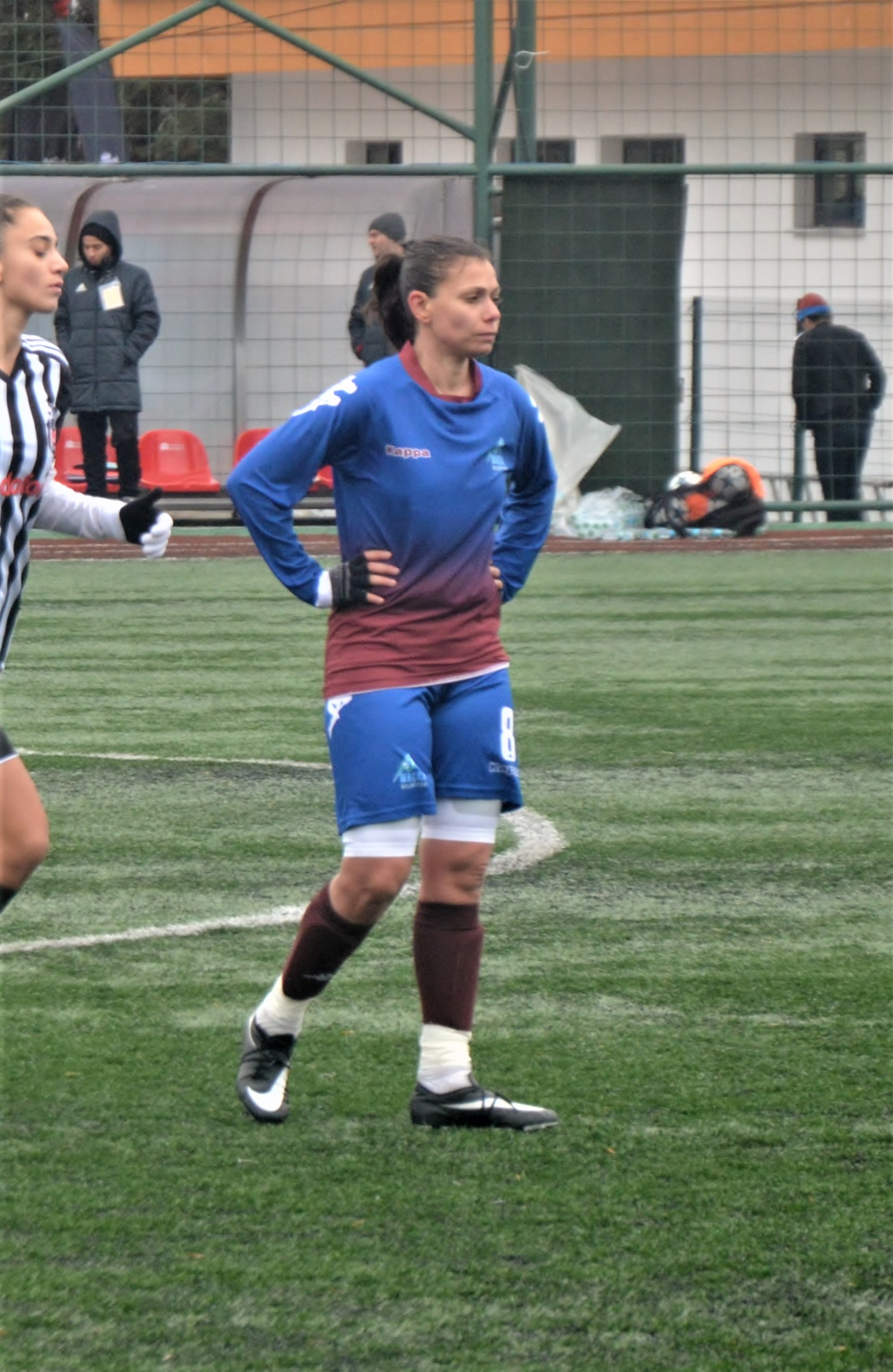
- Sayed with Trabzon İdmanocağı in 2017

Personal information
- Full name: Engy Ahmed Atya Sayed
- Date of birth: 4 September 1986 (age 40)
- Place of birth: Cairo, Egypt
- Position: Forward

Senior career*
Years	Team	Apps	(Gls)
- Wadi Degla
2017–2018	Trabzon İdmanocağı	8	(3)

International career
- Egypt
- * Club domestic league appearances and goals as of January 13, 2018

Engy Ahmed Atya Sayed (Arabic: إنجي أحمد عطية سيد, born September 4, 1986), commonly known as Engy Sayed, is an Egyptian footballer who plays as a forward for the Egypt national team and for Egyptian Women's Premier League club Al-Amerya.

== Early life ==
Engy Sayed was born in Cairo, Egypt on 4 September 4, 1986. She was supported by her family who love football, and used to play in the street with her brothers and other relatives. She marketed herself to foreign clubs through YouTube.

== Club career ==
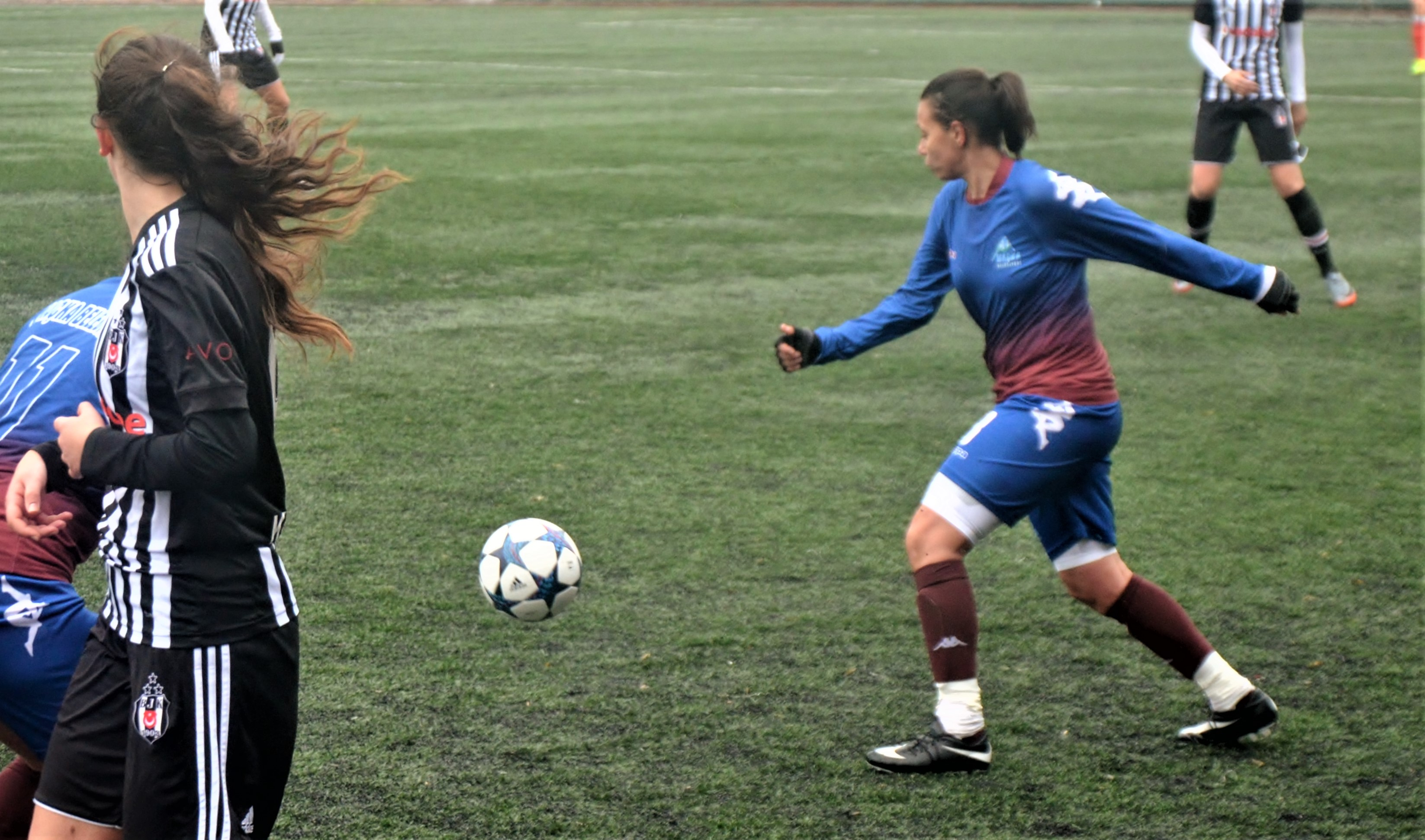
Engy Sayed (right) of Trabzon İdmanocağı attacking Beşiktaş J.K. (black/white in the 2017–18 Turkish Women's First League's away match.

Sayed played for the Cairo-based Wadi Degla SC before moving in November 2017 to Turkey to join Trabzon İdmanocağı, who play in the Turkish Women's First Football League (with jersey number 8).

She currently captains Egyptian club Al-Amerya. The team lost in the finals of the Egyptian Ladies FA Cup in 2023. It is the second time Sayed has lost in the finals with the club.

== International career ==
Sayed appeared for the Egypt women's national football team at the 2016 Africa Women Cup of Nations held in Cameroon. She scored twice in their qualifying campaign for the tournament, both goals being against Libya. As of 2023, she served as Egypt's captain.
