= Blessing Edoho =

Nigerian footballer

Personal information
- Full name: Blessing Edoho
- Date of birth: 5 September 1992 (age 34)
- Place of birth: Nigeria
- Height: 1.60 m (5 ft 3 in)
- Position: Defender

Team information
- Current team: Pelican Stars

International career^{‡}
| Years | Team | Apps | (Gls) |
| 2010–2015 | Nigeria | 4 | (1) |
- ‡ National team caps and goals as of 15:49, 17 June 2015 (UTC)

Blessing Edoho (born 5 September 1992 in Nigeria) is a Nigerian footballer who plays as a defender for Pelican Stars.

== International career ==
Edoho made her international debut in the 2010 FIFA U-20 Women's World Cup. In May 2015 Edoho was called up to play for team Nigeria in the 2015 FIFA Women's World Cup.
