= Ida Guehai =

Ivorian footballer

Rebecca Guehai
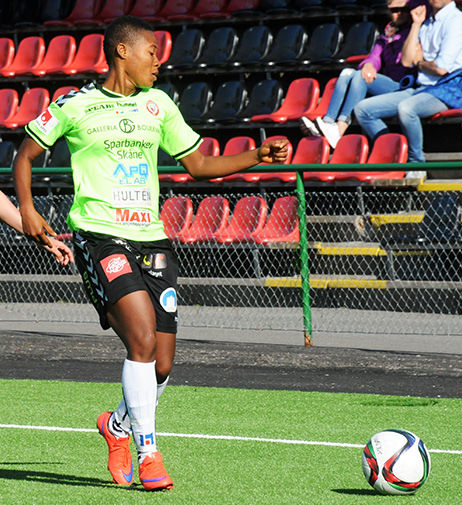

Personal information
- Full name: Ida Rebecca Guehai
- Date of birth: 15 July 1994 (age 32)
- Place of birth: Guibéroua, Ivory Coast
- Height: 1.64 m (5 ft 4 1/2 in)
- Positions: Midfielder; forward

Youth career
- Academie de Sefa

Senior career*
Years	Team	Apps	(Gls)
2009–2011	Eleven Sisters of Gagnoa		
2011–2014	Juventus de Yopougon		
2015–2016	Kristianstads DFF	29	(11)
2017–2018	Levante	19	(3)
2019–2024	Logroño	130	(24)
2024–2025	Sporting de Huelva	24	(5)
2025–2026	Cacereño	12	(0)

International career^{‡}
2011–	Ivory Coast	25	(1)
- * Club domestic league appearances and goals as of 11 April 2019 ‡ National team caps and goals as of 11:45, 16 June 2015 (UTC)

Ida Rebecca Guehai (born 15 July 1994), known as Rebecca Guehai, is an Ivorian professional footballer who plays as a midfielder or forward for the Ivory Coast women's national team.

In mid-August 2018, Guehai was diagnosed with cardiovascular deficiencies, which prevent her from playing high-level football. At the time, she was about to sign with RCD Espanyol. However, she did not retire.

== Club career ==
Guehai joined Kristianstads ahead of the 2015 season, aged 20. She scored three goals in her first two games and was hailed as the league's best acquisition in the Aftonbladet newspaper's mid-season review.

== International career ==
In December 2011, Guehai was called up in the Ivory Coast women's national football team. The following year she was part of the team selected for the 2012 African Women's Championship.

Guehai was included in the Ivory Coast women's team for the 2014 African Women's Championship that defeated South Africa, in a third place play-off finishing with Guehai's late goal, for a 1–0 win. The result qualified the underdog Ivory Coast for their debut FIFA Women's World Cup, at South Africa's expense.

== See also ==
- List of Ivory Coast women's international footballers
