= Stade Municipal de Kintélé =

Sports venue in Brazzaville, Republic of the Congo

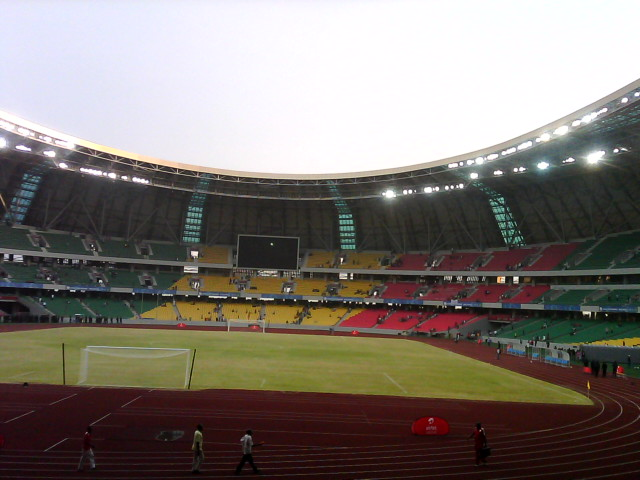
- Interactive map of Stade Municipal de Kintélé
- Full name: Stade Municipal de Kintélé
- Location: Brazzaville, Republic of the Congo
- Owner: Government of Republic of the Congo
- Capacity: 60,000
- Surface: Grass

Construction
- Groundbreaking: 2013
- Built: 2013–2015
- Opened: 2015
- General contractor: China State Construction Engineering

Tenant
- Congo national football team

Stade Municipal de Kintélé, also called Brazzavile Municipal Stadium or Stade municipal de Kintélé in Brazzaville is the national stadium of the Republic of the Congo. It is used for football matches and also has an athletics track. It hosts the home games of Congo national football team. It holds 60,000 people. and opened with a football match between Congo and Ghana. It served as the main venue for the 2015 All-Africa Games.

== See also ==
- Lists of stadiums
