= Sandrine Niamien =

Ivorian footballer

Personal information
- Full name: Adjoua Edwige Sandrine Niamien
- Date of birth: 30 August 1994 (age 32)
- Height: 1.70 m (5 ft 7 in)
- Position: Forward

Team information
- Current team: FC Inter d'Abidjan
- Number: 9

International career^{‡}
Years	Team	Apps	(Gls)
	Ivory Coast	2	(1)
- ‡ National team caps and goals as of 11:38, 16 June 2015 (UTC)

Sandrine Niamien (born 30 August 1994) is an Ivorian professional footballer who plays for FC Inter d'Abidjan. She was part of the Ivorian squad for the 2015 FIFA Women's World Cup.

== See also ==
- List of Ivory Coast women's international footballers
