= Rebecca Elloh =

Ivorian footballer (born 1994)

Rébecca Elloh
Personal information
- Full name: Amon Rébecca Grâce Elloh
- Date of birth: 25 December 1994 (age 31)
- Place of birth: Grand-Bassam, Ivory Coast
- Height: 1.60 m (5 ft 3 in)
- Position: Forward

Team information
- Current team: Valencia
- Number: 10

Senior career*
Years	Team	Apps	(Gls)
- Onze Sœurs de Gagnoa
2015	Gintra Universitetas		
2018–2019	Barcelona FA		
2019–2020	Pyrgos Limassol F.C.		
2020–2022	Logroño	61	(19)
2022–2024	Alavés	22	(2)
2024–2025	Levante Badalona	24	(3)
2025–	Valencia	22	(1)

International career^{‡}
	Ivory Coast	18	(2)
- * Club domestic league appearances and goals as of 8 September 2024 ‡ National team caps and goals as of 11:42, 16 June 2015 (UTC)

Amon Rébecca Grâce Elloh (born 25 December 1994), known as Rébecca Elloh, is an Ivorian professional footballer who plays as a forward for Primera Federación club Valencia and the Ivory Coast national team. She was part of the Ivorian squad for the 2015 FIFA Women's World Cup.

== See also ==
- List of Ivory Coast women's international footballers
