= 2025 African U-17 Women's World Cup qualification =

9th African qualification for the FIFA U-17 Women's World Cup

Tournament details
- Dates: January 2025 – 27 April 2025
- Teams: 23 (from 1 confederation)

Tournament statistics
- Matches played: 38
- Goals scored: 131 (3.45 per match)
- Top scorer(s): (Cameroon) Ange Tazanou (South Africa) Nomfundo Nzuza (Uganda) Agnes Nabukenya (6 goals each)

The 2025 African U-17 Women's World Cup qualification was the 10th edition of the African U-17 Women's World Cup qualification, the biennial international youth football competition organised by the Confederation of African Football (CAF) to determine which women's under-17 national teams from Africa qualify for the FIFA U-17 Women's World Cup. Players born on or after 1 January 2008 were eligible to compete in the tournament.

Four teams qualified from this tournament for the 2025 FIFA U-17 Women's World Cup in Morocco as the CAF representatives alongside the hosts Morocco.

== Format ==
Qualification ties were played on a home-and-away two-legged basis. If the aggregate score was tied after the second leg, the away goals rule was applied, and if still tied, the penalty shoot-out (no extra time) was used to determine the winner.

== Entrants ==
A total of 52 CAF member associations remained eligible to enter the qualification after Morocco automatically qualified as the World Cup host and Ghana was barred from competing in this age category due to a ban imposed for cheating during the 2022 qualifiers.

Only 28 teams including nine teams who did not participate in the previous edition, entered the competition. Teams that did not enter the qualification were listed below. The following teams with asterisks are the teams that never entered the qualification.

=== Did not enter ===
- Angola*
- Burkina Faso
- Cape Verde*
- Chad*
- Comoros*
- Djibouti
- Eritrea
- Gambia
- Ghana
- Guinea-Bissau
- Lesotho*
- Liberia
- Libya
- Madagascar*
- Malawi*
- Mali
- Mauritania
- Mauritius
- Mozambique
- Rwanda
- São Tomé and Príncipe
- Seychelles*
- Somalia*
- South Sudan
- Sudan*

=== Draw ===
The draw for the qualifiers was held on 12 December 2024 at the CAF Headquarters in Cairo, Egypt.

The 28 teams were seeded into six pots based on their performance at the qualifying tournament of the previous edition, decided by the round each team reached in the last edition, with ties in round decided by the number of points obtained in that particular round, the best goal difference, the highest goals scored, and the away goals. Geographical conditions were also considered, grouping neighboring zones together.

Qualification rankings

Pos	Team	Pld	W	D	L	GF	GA	GD	Pts	Round reached
1	Nigeria	6	5	1	0	24	2	+22	16	2024 FIFA U-17 Women's World Cup
2	Kenya	6	5	1	0	14	0	+14	16	2024 FIFA U-17 Women's World Cup
3	Zambia	6	3	1	2	10	3	+7	10	2024 FIFA U-17 Women's World Cup
4	Morocco	6	4	1	1	31	3	+28	13	Fourth round
5	Burundi	6	4	0	2	30	6	+24	12	Fourth round
6	Liberia	6	3	0	3	10	9	+1	9	Fourth round
7	Senegal	4	3	0	1	9	3	+6	9	Third round
8	Uganda	4	2	1	1	5	4	+1	7	Third round
9	Burkina Faso	4	2	1	1	7	9	−2	7	Third round
10	Djibouti	4	2	0	2	6	24	−18	6	Third round
11	Ethiopia	4	1	2	1	3	3	0	5	Third round
12	Algeria	4	1	0	3	2	10	−8	3	Third round
13	Benin	2	1	0	1	2	2	0	3	Second round
14	Tanzania	2	1	0	1	1	5	−4	3	Second round
15	Cameroon	2	0	1	1	2	4	−2	1	Second round
16	South Africa	2	0	1	1	0	3	−3	1	Second round
17	Guinea	2	0	0	2	2	6	−4	0	Second round
18	Botswana	2	0	0	2	1	6	−5	0	Second round
19	Central African Republic	2	0	0	2	0	12	−12	0	Second round
20	Niger	2	0	0	2	0	22	−22	0	Second round
21	DR Congo	2	0	0	2	0	6	−6	0	Forfeited the tie
21	Equatorial Guinea	2	0	0	2	0	6	−6	0	Forfeited the tie
21	Libya	2	0	0	2	0	6	−6	0	Forfeited the tie
21	Mali	2	0	0	2	0	6	−6	0	Forfeited the tie
25	Mauritius	2	0	0	2	0	6	−6	0	Forfeited the tie

Source: CAF

=== Draw pots ===
The three teams that qualified for the World Cup were exempt from the first round along with the highest-ranked non-qualified team Burundi, and were automatically seeded into ties in the second round. The qualification rankings from the previous edition are shown in parentheses, except for teams that did not participate which will be denoted by (–), and teams that participated but withdrew before playing are denoted by (w/o).

Teams exempted from the first round
1. Nigeria
2. Kenya
3. Zambia
5. Burundi (best ranked non-qualified team for the World Cup)

Teams entering the qualification first round
Lower ranked
Pot 1	Pot 3	Pot 5
Egypt (–); Eswatini (–); Namibia (–); Zimbabwe (–)	DR Congo (w/o); Equatorial Guinea (w/o); Congo (–); Gabon (–)	Tunisia (–); Sierra Leone (–); Togo (–); Ivory Coast (–)
Higher ranked
Pot 2	Pot 4	Pot 6
Uganda (8); Ethiopia (11); Tanzania (14); Cameroon (15)	Benin (13); South Africa (16); Botswana (18); Niger (20)	Senegal (7); Algeria (12); Guinea (17); Central African Republic (19)

== Schedule ==
Round	Leg	Date
First round	First leg	11–12 January 2025
First round	Second leg	17–19 January 2025
Second round	First leg	8–9 March 2025
Second round	Second leg	15–16 March 2025
Third round	First leg	19–20 April 2025
Third round	Second leg	25–26 April 2025

== Bracket ==
The four winners of the third round qualified for the 2025 FIFA U-17 Women's World Cup.

First round
Namibia	0	1	1
Uganda	10	8	18
Egypt	0	0	0
Cameroon	5	1	6
Zimbabwe	—	—
Ethiopia	—	—	w/o

Second round
Uganda	0	0	0
Kenya	2	3	5
Cameroon	5	1	6
Ethiopia	2	0	2

Third round
Kenya	0	1	1
Cameroon	1	3	4

First round
Eswatini	—	—
Tanzania	—	—	w/o
Congo	—	—
Benin	—	—	w/o
DR Congo	2	2	4
Niger	0	0	0

Second round
Tanzania	0	0	0
Zambia	3	1	4
Benin	2	3	5
DR Congo	0	0	0

Third round
Zambia	2	4	6
Benin	1	1	2

First round
Gabon	1	1	2
South Africa	12	9	21
Equatorial Guinea	—	—
Botswana	—	—	w/o
Tunisia	0	0	0
Algeria	1	0	1

Second round
South Africa	1	0	1
Nigeria	3	2	5
Botswana	2	0	2
Algeria	1	4	5

Third round
Nigeria	4	0	4
Algeria	0	0	0

First round
Ivory Coast (a)	1	2	3
Senegal	1	2	3
Sierra Leone	0	2	2
Central African Republic	0	0	0
Togo	—	—
Guinea	—	—	w/o

Second round
Ivory Coast	1	3	4
Burundi	3	0	3
Sierra Leone	2	1	3
Guinea	2	2	4

Third round
Ivory Coast (a)	1	1	2
Guinea	0	2	2

== First round ==
Team 1	Agg.	Team 2	1st leg	2nd leg
Namibia	1–18	Uganda	0–10	1–8
Egypt	0–6	Cameroon	0–5	0–1
Zimbabwe	w/o	Ethiopia	—	—
Eswatini	w/o	Tanzania	—	—
Congo	w/o	Benin	—	—
DR Congo	4–0	Niger	2–0	2–0
Gabon	2–21	South Africa	1–12 (Note: With the score 12–1 in favor of South Africa at half time the match was abandoned as Gabon were was unable to field the minimum of 6 players, Gabon started the match with a total of 10 players, including substitutes, due to most of their squad being ineligible for the qualifiers because of age restriction rules. During the first half, their goalkeeper sustained an injury, further reducing the team to 9 players.)	1–9
Equatorial Guinea	w/o	Botswana	—	—
Tunisia	0–1	Algeria	0–1	0–0
Ivory Coast	3–3 (a)	Senegal	1–1	2–2
Sierra Leone	2–0	Central African Republic	0–0	2–0
Togo	w/o	Guinea	—	—

16 January 2025
16:00 UTC+3

Namibia	0–10	Uganda
	Report	Nabukenya 6', 11', 18', 25', 69', 73'; Ariho 11', 42'; Namulindwa 67'; Blick 79'

Hamz Stadium, Kampala (Uganda)
19 January 2025
16:00 UTC+3

Uganda	8–1	Namibia
Tamara 14' (o.g.); Namulindwa 35', 46', 50'; Blick 36'; Ariho 55'; Nabirye 67'; Nakalema 75'	Report	Haukongo 69'

Hamz Stadium, Kampala

Uganda won 18–1 on aggregate.

12 January 2025
18:00 UTC+2

Egypt	0–5	Cameroon
	Report	Tazanou 25', 71', 83'; Ntsongo 28'; Tiwa 45+4' (pen.)

30 June Stadium, Cairo
18 January 2025
14:00 UTC+1

Cameroon	1–0	Egypt
Ntsongo 4'	Report

Stade Omnisports de Bafoussam, Bafoussam

Cameroon won 6–0 on aggregate.

Zimbabwe	Cancelled	Ethiopia
	Report

17 January 2025
15:00 UTC+3

Ethiopia	Cancelled	Zimbabwe
	Report

Abebe Bikila Stadium, Addis Ababa

Ethiopia won on walkover and advanced to the second round after Zimbabwe withdrew before the first leg.

Eswatini	Cancelled	Tanzania
	Report

Tanzania	Cancelled	Eswatini
	Report

Tanzania won on walkover and advanced to the second round after Eswatini withdrew before the first leg.

12 January 2025
15:30 UTC+1

Congo	Cancelled	Benin
	Report

Stade Alphonse Massemba-Débat, Brazzaville
19 January 2025
14:00 UTC+1

Benin	Cancelled	Congo
	Report

Stade Charles de Gaulle, Porto-Novo

Benin won on walkover and advanced to the second round after Congo withdrew before the first leg citing financial and institutional constraints beyond their federation control.

12 January 2025
15:30 UTC+1

DR Congo	2–0	Niger
Makika 31'; Kabunga 55'	Report

Stade des Martyrs, Kinshasa
19 January 2025
16:00 UTC+1

Niger	0–2	DR Congo
	Report	Butaka 15'; Kamondo 30'

Stade Général Seyni Kountché, Niamey

11 January 2025
15:30 UTC+1

Gabon	1–12 (Abandoned)	South Africa
11'	Report	Khoza 5', 27', 31' (??); Malebana 18' (??); Nzuza 25' (??); Simamane (??)

Stade de la rénovation, Franceville
18 January 2025
16:00 UTC+2

South Africa	9–1	Gabon
Khoza 7'; Nzuza 20', 29', 32'; Kock 74'; Mohale 78'; Horak 80', 90', 90+3'	Report	Mbassi 39'

Lucas Moripe Stadium, Pretoria

South Africa won 21–2 on aggregate.

12 January 2025
15:00 UTC+1

Equatorial Guinea	Cancelled	Botswana
	Report

Nuevo Estadio de Malabo, Malabo
19 January 2025
15:00 UTC+2

Botswana	Cancelled	Equatorial Guinea
	Report

Francistown Stadium, Francistown

Botswana won on walkover and advanced to the second round after Equatorial Guinea withdrew before the first leg.

12 January 2025
14:00 UTC+1

Tunisia	0–1	Algeria
	Report	Akkouche 58'

Sousse Olympic Stadium, Sousse
Referee: Yacine Samassa (Mauritania)
19 January 2025
14:00 UTC+1

Algeria	0–0	Tunisia
	Report

Mustapha Tchaker Stadium, Blida
Referee: Aurore Christelle Ligan (Benin)

Algeria won 1–0 on aggregate.

12 January 2025
16:00 UTC+0

Ivory Coast	1–1	Senegal
Kouame Appoh 5'	Report	Sangouthé 90'

Robert Champroux Stadium, Abidjan
19 January 2025
17:00 UTC+0

Senegal	2–2	Ivory Coast
Sarr 6', 33'	Report	N'Guessan 14'; DiGbeu 88'

Stade Lat-Dior, Thiès

11 January 2025
16:00 UTC+0

Sierra Leone	0–0	Central African Republic
	Report

Southern Arena, Bo
18 January 2025
15:00 UTC+1

Central African Republic	0–2	Sierra Leone
	Report	Kamara 45+2' (pen.); Turay 60'

Stade Omnisport de Douala, Douala (Cameroon)

Sierra Leone won 2–0 on aggregate.

Togo	Cancelled	Guinea
	Report

Guinea	Cancelled	Togo
	Report

Guinea won on walkover and advanced to the second round after Togo withdrew before the first leg.

== Second round ==
Team 1	Agg.	Team 2	1st leg	2nd leg
Uganda	0–5	Kenya	0–2	0–3
Cameroon	6–2	Ethiopia	5–2	1–0
Tanzania	0–4	Zambia	0–3	0–1
Benin	5–0	DR Congo	2–0	3–0
South Africa	1–5	Nigeria	1–3	0–2
Botswana	2–5	Algeria	2–1	0–4
Ivory Coast	4–3	Burundi	1–3	3–0
Sierra Leone	3–4	Guinea	2–2	1–2

8 March 2025
16:00 UTC+3

Uganda	0–2	Kenya
	Report	Nasipwondi 36'; Ogola 45+2'

Hamz Stadium, Kampala
16 March 2025
15:00 UTC+3

Kenya	3–0	Uganda
Asilko 5'; Achieng 86', 90+4'	Report

Nyayo National Stadium, Nairobi

Kenya won 5–0 on aggregate.

8 March 2025
19:00 UTC+1

Cameroon	5–2	Ethiopia
Tiwa 15', 86'; Tazanou 22'; Aghogue 26'; Meva 71'	Report	Kassau 3'; Birhanu 89'

Stade Omnisport Paul Biya, Yaoundé
15 March 2025
15:00 UTC+3

Ethiopia	0–1	Cameroon
	Report	Tazanou 12'

Abebe Bikila Stadium, Addis Ababa

Cameroon won 6–2 on aggregate.

9 March 2025
16:00 UTC+3

Tanzania	0–3	Zambia
	Report	Phiri 64'; Chipasula 80', 89' (pen.)

Azam Complex Stadium, Chamazi
15 March 2025
15:00 UTC+2

Zambia	1–0	Tanzania
Sekeseke 53'	Report

Levy Mwanawasa Stadium, Ndola

Zambia won 4–0 on aggregate.

9 March 2025
15:00 UTC+0

Benin	2–0	DR Congo
Lokossou 66'; Gandonou 90+2'	Report

Stade de Kégué, Lomé (Togo)
16 March 2025
15:30 UTC+1

DR Congo	0–3	Benin
	Report	Ebi 22'; Gandonou 63'; Etchou 65'

Stade des Martyrs, Kinshasa

Benin won 5–0 on aggregate.

8 March 2025
15:00 UTC+2

South Africa	1–3	Nigeria
Malebana 47' (pen.)	Report	Moshood 20'; Chidi 41' (pen.), 67'

Lucas Moripe Stadium, Pretoria
15 March 2025
16:00 UTC+1

Nigeria	2–0	South Africa
Chidi 37'; Animashaun 56'	Report

Remo Stars Stadium, Ikenne

Nigeria won 5–1 on aggregate.

8 March 2025
15:00 UTC+2

Botswana	2–1	Algeria
Lesotlho 64'; Sebotho 90+4'	Report	Sehoul 20'

Obed Itani Chilume Stadium, Francistown
16 March 2025
21:00 UTC+1

Algeria	4–0	Botswana
Rebbahi 23'; Sehoul 42', 82'; Iskounen 71'	Report

Mustapha Tchaker Stadium, Blida

Algeria won 5–2 on aggregate.

9 March 2025
16:00 UTC+0

Ivory Coast	1–3	Burundi
Bah 31'	Report	Nibogora 8', 48'; Nishmwe 36'

Felix Houphouet Boigny Stadium, Abidjan
12 March 2025
16:00 UTC+0

Burundi	0–3	Ivory Coast
	Report	Koné 9'; Bah 15'; N'Guessan 69'

Felix Houphouet Boigny Stadium, Abidjan (Ivory Coast)

Ivory Coast won 4–3 on aggregate.

8 March 2025
16:00 UTC+0

Sierra Leone	2–2	Guinea
Turay 28'; A. Kamara 47'	Report	Koroma 15' (o.g.); A. Diallo 84'

Southern Arena, Bo
15 March 2025
16:00 UTC+0

Guinea	2–1	Sierra Leone
Kouyaté 8'; A. Diallo 54'	Report	Turay 51'

Stade Mamadou Konaté, Bamako (Mali)

Guinea won 4–3 on aggregate.

== Third round ==
Team 1	Agg.	Team 2	1st leg	2nd leg
Kenya	1–4	Cameroon	0–1	1–3
Zambia	6–2	Benin	2–1	4–1
Nigeria	4–0	Algeria	4–0	0–0
Ivory Coast	2–2 (a)	Guinea	1–0	1–2

20 April 2025
15:00 UTC+3

Kenya	0–1	Cameroon
	Report	Tiwa 26'

Nyayo National Stadium, Nairobi
25 April 2025
19:00 UTC+1

Cameroon	3–1	Kenya
Avana 7'; Tazanou 53'; Tiwa 86' (pen.)	Report	Ochaka 51' (pen.)

Olembe Stadium, Yaoundé

Cameroon won 4–1 on aggregate.

19 April 2025
15:00 UTC+2

Zambia	2–1	Benin
Chipasula 16', 67'	Report	Gandonou 56'

Levy Mwanawasa Stadium, Ndola
Referee: Yacine Samassa (Mauritania)
26 April 2025
16:00 UTC+1

Benin	1–4	Zambia
Mamam Kouta 14'	Report	Chipasula 4', 8'; Mbali 80'; Mukoma 82'

Stade de Kégué, Lomé (Togo)

Zambia won 6–2 on aggregate.

19 April 2025
16:00 UTC+1

Nigeria	4–0	Algeria
Joseph 1', 16'; Raji 13'; Animashaun 90'	Report

Remo Stars Stadium, Ikenne
Referee: Shamirah Nabadda (Uganda)
25 April 2025
20:00 UTC+1

Algeria	0–0	Nigeria
	Report

Mustapha Tchaker Stadium, Blida
Referee: Aline Guimbang Etong (Cameroon)

Nigeria won 4–0 on aggregate.

20 April 2025
17:00 UTC+0

Ivory Coast	1–0	Guinea
Kone 54'	Report

Felix Houphouet Boigny Stadium, Abidjan
25 April 2025
17:00 UTC+0

Guinea	2–1	Ivory Coast
A. Diallo 33'; Zaddy 57' (o.g.)	Report	N'Guessan 6'

Stade Mamadou Konaté, Bamako (Mali)
Referee: Aline Umutoni (Rwanda)

2–2 on aggregate. Ivory Coast won on away goals.

== Qualified teams for the 2025 FIFA U-17 Women's World Cup ==
The following five teams from CAF qualified for the 2025 FIFA U-17 Women's World Cup including Morocco who automatically qualified as host.

Team	Qualified on	Previous appearances in the FIFA U-17 Women's World Cup.
Morocco	14 March 2024	1 (2022)
Ivory Coast	25 April 2025	0 (debut)
Cameroon	25 April 2025	2 (2016, 2018)
Nigeria	25 April 2025	7 (2008, 2010, 2012, 2014, 2016, 2022, 2024)
Zambia	26 April 2025	2 (2014, 2024)

== Goalscorers ==
There have been 110 goals scored in 30 matches, for an average of 3.67 goals per match (as of 16 March 2025).

6 goals

- (Zambia) Mercy Chipasula
- (South Africa) Nomfundo Nzuza
- (Uganda) Agnes Nabukenya

5 goals

- (Cameroon) Ange Tazanou
- (South Africa) Khwezi Khoza

4 goals

- (Uganda) Joan Namulindwa

3 goals

- (Algeria) Hanane Sehoul
- (Cameroon) Lys Tiwa
- (Nigeria) Harmony Chidi
- (Sierra Leone) Maseray Turay
- (South Africa) Lilani Horak
- (South Africa) Katleho Malebana
- (South Africa) Akhona Simamane
- (Uganda) Rinah Ariho

2 goals

- (Burundi) Davina Nibogora
- (Cameroon) Nkoussa Ntsongo
- (Guinea) Aïssatou Diallo
- (Ivory Coast) Naomie Bah
- (Ivory Coast) Rolande N'Guessan
- (Kenya) Brenda Achieng
- (Senegal) Marie Louise Sarr
- (Sierra Leone) Aminata Kamara
- (Uganda) Isabella Blick

1 goal

- (Algeria) Amilia Akkouche
- (Algeria) Céline Iskounen
- (Algeria) Zaza Rebbahi
- (Benin) Deo-Gratias Ebi
- (Benin) Labylle Etchou
- (Benin) Romaine Gandonou
- (Benin) Yenido Gandonou
- (Benin) Hermionne Lokossou
- (Botswana) Hope Lesotlho
- (Botswana) Amogelang Sebotho
- (Burundi) Anne-Marie Nishmwe
- (Cameroon) Crystal Aghogue
- (Cameroon) Christiane Kiki Meva
- (Democratic Republic of the Congo) Grâce Butaka
- (Democratic Republic of the Congo) Marry Kabunga
- (Democratic Republic of the Congo) Esther Kamondo
- (Democratic Republic of the Congo) Olive Makika
- (Gabon)
- (Gabon) Noëlla Mbassi
- (Guinea) Aïcha Kouyaté
- (Ivory Coast) Francine DiGbeu
- (Ivory Coast) Alimatou Zea Koné
- (Ivory Coast) Esther Kouamé
- (Kenya) Patience Asilko
- (Kenya) Edinah Nasipwondi
- (Kenya) Joan Ogola
- (Namibia) Shiwovanhu Haukongo
- (Nigeria) Aishat Animashaun
- (Nigeria) Shakirat Moshood
- (Senegal) Coumba Sangouthé
- (South Africa) Leonay Kock
- (South Africa) Katlego Mohale
- (Uganda) Shadia Nabirye
- (Uganda) Rashida Nakalema
- (Zambia) Grace Phiri
- (Zambia) Masela Sekeseke

1 own goal

- (Namibia) Renalda Tamara (against Uganda)
- (Sierra Leone) Fatmata Koroma (against Guinea)

== See also ==
- 2026 Women's Africa Cup of Nations
- 2026 African U-20 Women's World Cup qualification
