= 2016 African U-17 Women's World Cup qualification =

2016 African U-17 Women's World Cup Qualifying Tournament
Tournament details
- Dates: 27 November 2015 – 26 March 2016
- Teams: 15 (from 1 confederation)

Tournament statistics
- Matches played: 14
- Goals scored: 53 (3.79 per match)
- Top scorer(s): (Egypt) Noha Tarek (Nigeria) Rasheedat Ajibade (8 goals each)

The 2016 African U-17 Women's World Cup Qualifying Tournament was the 5th edition of the African U-17 Women's World Cup Qualifying Tournament, the biennial international youth football competition organised by the Confederation of African Football (CAF) to determine which women's under-17 national teams from Africa qualify for the FIFA U-17 Women's World Cup. Players born on or after 1 January 1999 were eligible to compete in the tournament.

The top three teams of the tournament qualified for the 2016 FIFA U-17 Women's World Cup in Jordan as the CAF representatives.

Ghana and Nigeria qualified for the World Cup like in the last four editions, while Cameroon qualified for the first time.

== Teams ==
A total of 15 CAF member national teams entered the qualifying rounds.

Round	Teams entering round	No. of teams
Preliminary round	Botswana; Djibouti; DR Congo; Gabon; Namibia; Sierra Leone	6
First round	Cameroon; Egypt; Ethiopia; Ghana; Mali; Morocco; Nigeria; South Africa; Zambia	9
Qualifying rounds	Total	15

Did not enter
- Algeria
- Angola
- Benin
- Burkina Faso
- Burundi
- Cape Verde
- Central African Republic
- Chad
- Comoros
- Congo
- Equatorial Guinea
- Eritrea
- Gambia
- Guinea
- Guinea-Bissau
- Ivory Coast
- Kenya
- Lesotho
- Liberia
- Libya
- Madagascar
- Malawi
- Mauritania
- Mauritius
- Mozambique
- Niger
- Rwanda
- São Tomé and Príncipe
- Senegal
- Seychelles
- Somalia
- South Sudan
- Sudan
- Swaziland
- Tanzania
- Togo
- Tunisia
- Uganda
- Zimbabwe

== Format ==
Qualification ties were played on a home-and-away two-legged basis. If the aggregate score was tied after the second leg, the away goals rule would be applied, and if still level, the penalty shoot-out would be used to determine the winner (no extra time would be played).

The three winners of the second round qualified for the FIFA U-17 Women's World Cup.

== Schedule ==
The schedule of the qualifying rounds was as follows.

Round	Leg	Date
Preliminary round	First leg	27–29 November 2015
Preliminary round	Second leg	11–13 December 2015
First round	First leg	8–10 January 2016
First round	Second leg	22–24 January 2016
Second round	First leg	11–13 March 2016
Second round	Second leg	25–27 March 2016

== Preliminary round ==
Team 1	Agg.	Team 2	1st leg	2nd leg
Gabon	w/o	Sierra Leone	—	—
Djibouti	w/o	DR Congo	—	—
Botswana	2–3	Namibia	1–2	1–1

Note: DR Congo and Gabon withdrew.

27 November 2015

Gabon	Cancelled	Sierra Leone
	Report

11 December 2015

Sierra Leone	Cancelled	Gabon
	Report

Sierra Leone won on walkover.

27 November 2015

Djibouti	Cancelled	DR Congo
	Report

11 December 2015

DR Congo	Cancelled	Djibouti
	Report

Djibouti won on walkover.

29 November 2015
16:00 UTC+2

Botswana	1–2	Namibia
Radiakanyo 45+1'	Report	Van Wyk 34'; Haoses 84'

Molepololo Sport Complex, Gaborone
Referee: Sarah Selemani (Zambia)
13 December 2015
16:00 UTC+2

Namibia	1–1	Botswana
Van Wyk 60'	Report	Abueng 19'

Sam Nujoma Stadium, Windhoek
Referee: Marximina Luzia Bernardo (Angola)

Namibia won 3–2 on aggregate.

== First round ==
Team 1	Agg.	Team 2	1st leg	2nd leg
Morocco	w/o	Mali	—	—
Ghana	w/o	Sierra Leone	—	—
Cameroon	3–3 (5–4 p)	Ethiopia	2–1	1–2
Egypt	9–0	Djibouti	6–0	3–0
Nigeria	9–0	Namibia	4–0	5–0
South Africa	w/o	Zambia	—	—

Note: Sierra Leone, Mali and Zambia withdrew.

8 January 2016

Morocco	Cancelled	Mali
	Report

22 January 2016

Mali	Cancelled	Morocco
	Report

Morocco won on walkover.

8 January 2016

Ghana	Cancelled	Sierra Leone
	Report

22 January 2016

Sierra Leone	Cancelled	Ghana
	Report

Ghana won on walkover.

9 January 2016
15:00 UTC+1

Cameroon	2–1	Ethiopia
Djoubi 59' (pen.), 78'	Report	Demeke 39'

Stade de la Réunification, Douala
Referee: Aissata Diarra (Mali)
24 January 2016
19:00 UTC+3

Ethiopia	2–1	Cameroon
Demeke 10'; Lakew 19'	Report	Takounda 87'
Penalties
	4–5

Addis Ababa Stadium, Addis Ababa
Referee: Akhona Makalima (South Africa)

3–3 on aggregate. Cameroon won on penalties.

9 January 2016
14:30 UTC+2

Egypt	6–0	Djibouti
Mostafa 16'; Tarek 31', 48', 65', 90+5'; Ezzat 56'	Report

30 June Stadium, Cairo
Referee: Zomadre Sonia Kore (Ivory Coast)
23 January 2016
16:00 UTC+3

Djibouti	0–3	Egypt
	Report	Tarek 44', 48', 57'

Stade du Ville, Djibouti
Referee: Maria Rivet (Mauritius)

Egypt won 9–0 on aggregate.

9 January 2016
16:00 UTC+1

Nigeria	4–0	Namibia
Ajibade 13', 67'; Aku 35'; Efih 43'	Report

National Stadium, Abuja
Referee: Lamyaa Lourarhi (Morocco)
22 January 2016
16:00 UTC+2

Namibia	0–5	Nigeria
	Report	Dike 4'; Aku 32', 53'; Ajibade 69'; Fajobi 85'

Sam Nujoma Stadium, Windhoek
Referee: Pearl Katlholo Moremi (Botswana)

Nigeria won 9–0 on aggregate.

8 January 2016

South Africa	Cancelled	Zambia
	Report

22 January 2016

Zambia	Cancelled	South Africa
	Report

South Africa won on walkover.

== Second round ==
Winners qualified for 2016 FIFA U-17 Women's World Cup.

Team 1	Agg.	Team 2	1st leg	2nd leg
Morocco	0–10	Ghana	0–4	0–6
Cameroon	6–1	Egypt	2–1	4–0
Nigeria	7–0	South Africa	6–0	1–0

12 March 2016
15:30 UTC±0

Morocco	0–4	Ghana
	Report	Abdulai 4', 22'; Alhassan 15'; Owusu-Ansah 71'

Stade de FUS, Rabat
Referee: Neama Mohamed Rashad (Egypt)
26 March 2016
15:00 UTC±0

Ghana	6–0	Morocco
Abdulai 3'; Asuako 39' (pen.); Abdul Rahman 64', 79'; Owusu-Ansah 68'; Asantewaa 77'	Report

Accra Sports Stadium, Accra
Referee: Uloma Nneka Nwogu (Nigeria)

Ghana won 10–0 on aggregate.

12 March 2016
15:00 UTC+1

Cameroon	2–1	Egypt
Takounda 12'; Djoubi 36' (pen.)	Report	Tarek 38'

Stade de la Réunification, Douala
Referee: Patricia Obone Obiang (Gabon)
26 March 2016
17:00 UTC+2

Egypt	0–4	Cameroon
	Report	Takounda 7', 11'; Dabda 21'; Mpeh Bissong 27'

30 June Stadium, Cairo
Referee: Carolyne Wanjala (Kenya)

Cameroon won 6–1 on aggregate.

12 March 2016
16:00 UTC+1

Nigeria	6–0	South Africa
Fajobi 2', 30'; Ajibade 26', 33', 34', 42'	Report

National Stadium, Abuja
Referee: Isatou Touray (Gambia)
26 March 2016
14:00 UTC+2

South Africa	0–1	Nigeria
	Report	Ajibade 27'

Makhulong Stadium, Johannesburg
Referee: Gladys Lengwe (Zambia)

Nigeria won 7–0 on aggregate.

== Qualified teams for FIFA U-17 Women's World Cup ==
The following three teams from CAF qualified for the FIFA U-17 Women's World Cup.

Team	Qualified on	Previous appearances in tournament^{1}
Ghana	26 March 2016	4 (2008, 2010, 2012, 2014)
Cameroon	26 March 2016	0 (Debut)
Nigeria	26 March 2016	4 (2008, 2010, 2012, 2014)

^{1} Bold indicates champion for that year. Italic indicates host for that year.

== Goalscorers ==
8 goals

- (Egypt) Noha Tarek
- (Nigeria) Rasheedat Ajibade

4 goals

- (Cameroon) Alexandra Takounda

3 goals

- (Cameroon) Soline Djoubi
- (Ghana) Mukarama Abdulai
- (Nigeria) Cynthia Aku
- (Nigeria) Yetunde Fajobi

2 goals

- (Ethiopia) Melat Demeke
- (Ghana) Barikisu Abdul Rahman
- (Ghana) Sandra Owusu-Ansah
- (Namibia) Kylie van Wyk

1 goal

- (Botswana) Michelle Abueng
- (Botswana) Lesego Radiakanyo
- (Cameroon) Claudia Dabda
- (Cameroon) Christiana Mpeh Bissong
- (Egypt) Nadin Yasser Ezzat
- (Egypt) Yara Mostafa
- (Ethiopia) Ymisrach Lakew
- (Ghana) Grace Asantewaa
- (Ghana) Rafia Alhassan
- (Ghana) Philicity Asuako
- (Namibia) Ignacia Haoses
- (Nigeria) Patience Dike
- (Nigeria) Peace Efih
