= 2018 African U-17 Women's World Cup qualification =

2018 African U-17 Women's World Cup Qualifying Tournament
Tournament details
- Dates: 14 October 2017 – 18 February 2018
- Teams: 17 (from 1 confederation)

Tournament statistics
- Matches played: 17
- Goals scored: 84 (4.94 per match)
- Top scorer(s): (Ghana) Mukarama Abdulai (12 goals)

The 2018 African U-17 Women's World Cup Qualifying Tournament was the 6th edition of the African U-17 Women's World Cup Qualifying Tournament, the biennial international youth football competition organised by the Confederation of African Football (CAF) to determine which women's under-17 national teams from Africa qualify for the FIFA U-17 Women's World Cup.

Players born on or after 1 January 2001 are eligible to compete in the tournament. Three teams qualify from this tournament for the 2018 FIFA U-17 Women's World Cup in Uruguay as the CAF representatives.

For the first time Nigeria failed to qualify for the Women's World Cup at any age level (senior, U-20 or U-17).

== Teams ==
A total of 17 (out of 54) CAF member national teams entered the qualifying rounds. The draw was announced by the CAF on 7 August 2017.

Bye to first round (7 teams)	Preliminary round entrants (10 teams)
**Cameroon**; Equatorial Guinea; **Ghana**; Morocco; Nigeria; **South Africa**; Tunisia	Algeria; Botswana; Djibouti; Ethiopia; Gambia; Kenya; Libya; Mali; Sierra Leone; Zambia

Notes

- Teams in **bold** qualified for the World Cup.

Did not enter

- Angola
- Benin
- Burundi
- Burkina Faso
- Cape Verde
- Central African Republic
- Chad
- Comoros
- Congo
- DR Congo
- Egypt
- Eritrea
- Gabon
- Guinea
- Guinea-Bissau
- Ivory Coast
- Lesotho
- Liberia
- Madagascar
- Malawi
- Mauritania
- Mauritius
- Mozambique
- Namibia
- Niger
- Rwanda
- São Tomé and Príncipe
- Senegal
- Seychelles
- Somalia
- South Sudan
- Sudan
- Eswatini
- Tanzania
- Togo
- Uganda
- Zimbabwe

== Format ==
Qualification ties are played on a home-and-away two-legged basis. If the aggregate score is tied after the second leg, the away goals rule is applied, and if still tied, the penalty shoot-out (no extra time) is used to determine the winner.

== Schedule ==
The schedule of the qualifying rounds is as follows.

Round	Leg	Date
Preliminary round	First leg	13–15 October 2017
Preliminary round	Second leg	27–29 October 2017
First round	First leg	1–3 December 2017
First round	Second leg	15–17 December 2017
Second round	First leg	2–4 February 2018
Second round	Second leg	16–18 February 2018

== Bracket ==
The three winners of the second round qualify for the 2018 FIFA U-17 Women's World Cup.

Preliminary round
Libya	—	—
Djibouti	—	—	w/o
Sierra Leone	0	—
Gambia	3	—	w/o

First round
Djibouti	—	—	w/o
Tunisia	—	—
Gambia	1	0	1
Ghana	5	2	7

Second round
Djibouti	0	0	0
Ghana	9	10	19

Preliminary round
Zambia	5	0	5
Botswana	2	4	6

First round
Botswana	2	4	6
South Africa	5	6	11
Morocco	—	—	w/o
Equatorial Guinea	—	—

Second round
South Africa	5	1	6
Morocco	1	0	1

Preliminary round
Ethiopia	—	—	w/o
Kenya	—	—
Mali	—	—
Algeria	—	—	w/o

First round
Ethiopia	1	0	1
Nigeria (a)	1	0	1
Algeria	0	0	0
Cameroon	4	7	11

Second round
Nigeria	2	1	3
Cameroon (a)	2	1	3

== Preliminary round ==
Team 1	Agg.	Team 2	1st leg	2nd leg
Libya	w/o	Djibouti	—	—
Sierra Leone	w/o	Gambia	0–3	—
Zambia	5–6	Botswana	5–2	0–4
Ethiopia	w/o	Kenya	—	—
Mali	w/o	Algeria	—	—

13 October 2017

Libya	Cancelled	Djibouti
	Report

27 October 2017

Djibouti	Cancelled	Libya
	Report

Djibouti won on walkover after Libya withdrew.

14 October 2017
16:30 UTC+0

Sierra Leone	0–3	Gambia
	Report	Jatta 14'; Camara 17'; Buwaro 26'

Bo Stadium, Bo Town
Referee: Salematou Bah (Guinea)
28 October 2017
16:30 UTC+0

Gambia	Cancelled	Sierra Leone
	Report

Independence Stadium, Bakau
Referee: Aissata Ameyo Amegee (Togo)

Gambia won on walkover after Sierra Leone withdrew prior to the second leg.

15 October 2017
15:00 UTC+2

Zambia	5–2	Botswana
Phiri 21', 27', 53', 85'; Mubanga 31'	Report	Gaofetoge 55'; Abueng 80' (pen.)

Nkoloma Stadium, Lusaka
Referee: Mathabo Maria Kolokotoane (Lesotho)
27 October 2017
16:00 UTC+2

Botswana	4–0	Zambia
Abueng 11', 29', 87'; Gaofetoge 64'	Report

Lobatse Stadium, Lobatse
Referee: Mercy Mziya (Malawi)

Botswana won 6–5 on aggregate.

13 October 2017

Ethiopia	Cancelled	Kenya
	Report

27 October 2017

Kenya	Cancelled	Ethiopia
	Report

Ethiopia won on walkover after Kenya withdrew.

13 October 2017

Mali	Cancelled	Algeria
	Report

27 October 2017

Algeria	Cancelled	Mali
	Report

Algeria won on walkover after Mali withdrew.

== First round ==
Team 1	Agg.	Team 2	1st leg	2nd leg
Djibouti	w/o	Tunisia	—	—
Gambia	1–7	Ghana	1–5	0–2
Botswana	6–11	South Africa	2–5	4–6
Morocco	w/o	Equatorial Guinea	—	—
Ethiopia	1–1 (a)	Nigeria	1–1	0–0
Algeria	0–11	Cameroon	0–4	0–7

1 December 2017

Djibouti	Cancelled	Tunisia
	Report

15 December 2017

Tunisia	Cancelled	Djibouti
	Report

Djibouti won on walkover after Tunisia withdrew.

2 December 2017
16:00 UTC+0

Gambia	1–5	Ghana
Sowe 43'	Report	Norshie 2'; Abdulai 12', 26', 29', 87'

Independence Stadium, Bakau
Referee: Vincentia Enyonam Amedome (Togo)
16 December 2017
15:00 UTC+0

Ghana	2–0	Gambia
S. Teye 85'; Abdulai 90'	Report

Cape Coast Sports Stadium, Cape Coast
Referee: Fatou Thioune (Senegal)

Ghana won 7–1 on aggregate.

1 December 2017
15:00 UTC+2

Botswana	2–5	South Africa
Senwelo 16', 88'	Report	Dhlamini 1'; Mzoneli 14'; Mosotho 41' (o.g.); Minnies 56'; Wade 70'

Lobatse Stadium, Lobatse
Referee: Salma Mukansanga (Rwanda)
16 December 2017
15:00 UTC+2

South Africa	6–4	Botswana
Dhlamini 21'; Mzoneli 24'; Minnies 32', 39'; T. Shamase 42'; Jordaan 77'	Report	Rathari 30', 90+2'; Botlhale 50', 80'

Dobsonville Stadium, Johannesburg
Referee: Carolyne Wanjala (Kenya)

South Africa won 11–6 on aggregate.

3 December 2017
15:00 UTC+0

Morocco	Cancelled	Equatorial Guinea
	Report

Stade Boubker Ammar, Salé
15 December 2017

Equatorial Guinea	Cancelled	Morocco
	Report

Morocco won on walkover after Equatorial Guinea withdrew.

3 December 2017
16:00 UTC+3

Ethiopia	1–1	Nigeria
Debiso 62'	Report	Jerry 21'

Addis Ababa Stadium, Addis Ababa
Referee: Jonesia Rukyaa Kabakama (Tanzania)
16 December 2017
15:00 UTC+1

Nigeria	0–0	Ethiopia
	Report

Samuel Ogbemudia Stadium, Benin City
Referee: Letticia Antonella Viana (Swaziland)

1–1 on aggregate. Nigeria won on away goals.

1 December 2017
17:45 UTC+1

Algeria	0–4	Cameroon
	Report	Ngah 17', 75'; Kome 22'; Kameni 61'

Omar Hamadi Stadium, Algiers
Attendance: 300
Referee: Dorsaf Ganouati (Tunisia)
16 December 2017
15:00 UTC+1

Cameroon	7–0	Algeria
Kameni 3', 55'; Fanta 8'; Ngah 15', 88'; Mefire 18', 64'	Report

Stade Ahmadou Ahidjo, Yaoundé
Referee: Akhona Makalima (South Africa)

Cameroon won 11–0 on aggregate.

== Second round ==
Winners qualify for 2018 FIFA U-17 Women's World Cup.

Team 1	Agg.	Team 2	1st leg	2nd leg
Djibouti	0–19	Ghana	0–9	0–10
South Africa	6–1	Morocco	5–1	1–0
Nigeria	3–3 (a)	Cameroon	2–2	1–1

2 February 2018
16:00 UTC+3

Djibouti	0–9	Ghana
	Report	S. Teye 27'; Abdulai 40', 42', 46'; Tutuawaa 44'; Owusu 48'; Mumuni 78'; Pokuaa 79'; Alhassan 88'

El Hadj Hassan Gouled Aptidon Stadium, Djibouti
Referee: Khadmallah Elsayed Angato Koko (Sudan)
18 February 2018
15:00 UTC+0

Ghana	10–0	Djibouti
Mumuni 10'; Abdulai 6', 13', 22', 49'; Norshie 65', 78'; Rahman 84'; V. Teye 86'; Bugrie 90+1'	Report

Cape Coast Sports Stadium, Cape Coast
Referee: Bouchra Karboubi (Morocco)

Ghana won 19–0 on aggregate.

4 February 2018
15:00 UTC+2

South Africa	5–1	Morocco
Mzoneli 9'; Dhlamini 12', 25'; Minnies 40'; S. Shamase 64'	Report	Mouadni 72'

Dobsonville Stadium, Johannesburg
Referee: Mathabo Maria Kolokotoane (Lesotho)
17 February 2018
14:30 UTC+0

Morocco	0–1	South Africa
	Report	Holweni 68'

Stade Boubker Ammar, Salé
Referee: Dorsaf Ganouati (Tunisia)

South Africa won 6–1 on aggregate.

3 February 2018
16:00 UTC+1

Nigeria	2–2	Cameroon
Martha 2'; Ikekhua 54'	Report	Ngah 8'; Kameni 43'

Samuel Ogbemudia Stadium, Benin City
Referee: Aurore Christelle Ligan (Benin)
18 February 2018
15:30 UTC+1

Cameroon	1–1	Nigeria
Kameni 31'	Report	Martha 76'

Stade Ahmadou Ahidjo, Yaoundé
Referee: Suavis Iratunga (Burundi)

3–3 on aggregate. Cameroon won on away goals.

== Qualified teams for FIFA U-17 Women's World Cup ==
The following three teams from CAF qualified for the 2018 FIFA U-17 Women's World Cup.

Team	Qualified on	Previous appearances in FIFA U-17 Women's World Cup^{1}
Ghana	18 February 2018	5 (2008, 2010, 2012, 2014, 2016)
South Africa	17 February 2018	1 (2010)
Cameroon	18 February 2018	1 (2016)

^{1} Bold indicates champions for that year. Italic indicates hosts for that year.

== Goalscorers ==
12 goals

- (Ghana) Mukarama Abdulai

5 goals

- (Cameroon) Alice Kameni
- (Cameroon) Marie Ngah

4 goals

- (Botswana) Michelle Abueng
- (South Africa) Karabo Dhlamini
- (South Africa) Miche Minnies
- (Zambia) Christabel Phiri

3 goals

- (Ghana) Nina Norshie
- (South Africa) Thambolinye Mzoneli

2 goals

- (Botswana) Letso Botlhale
- (Botswana) Lone Gaofetoge
- (Botswana) Obonetse Oratile Rathari
- (Botswana) Leungo Senwelo
- (Cameroon) Viviane Mefire
- (Ghana) Fuseina Mumuni
- (Ghana) Suzzy Teye
- (Nigeria) Precious Martha

1 goal

- (Cameroon) Florence Fanta
- (Cameroon) Fatima Kome
- (Ethiopia) Tarikuwa Debiso
- (The Gambia) Ola Buwaro
- (The Gambia) Aminata Camara
- (The Gambia) Cathrine Jatta
- (The Gambia) Fatoumata Sowe
- (Ghana) Adama Alhassan
- (Ghana) Azuma Bugrie
- (Ghana) Jacqueline Owusu
- (Ghana) Millot Pokuaa
- (Ghana) Barikisu Rahman
- (Ghana) Victoria Teye
- (Ghana) Abigail Tutuawaa
- (Morocco) Noura Mouadni
- (Nigeria) Osaretin Ikekhua
- (Nigeria) Joy Jerry
- (South Africa) Sibulele Holweni
- (South Africa) Kaylin Jordaan
- (South Africa) Sphumelele Shamase
- (South Africa) Thubelihle Shamase
- (South Africa) Jessica Wade
- (Zambia) Lydia Mubanga

1 own goal

- (Botswana) Tshegofatso Mosotho (against South Africa)
