= 2019 CECAFA Women's U-17 Championship =

Tournament details
- Host country: Uganda
- City: Kampala
- Dates: 9–17 December
- Teams: 6 (from 1 sub-confederation)
- Venue: 1 (in 1 host city)

Final positions
- Champions: Uganda (1st title)
- Runners-up: Tanzania
- Third place: Kenya
- Fourth place: Burundi

Tournament statistics
- Matches played: 15
- Goals scored: 91 (6.07 per match)
- Top scorer(s): (Tanzania) Aisha Masaka (12 goals)
- Best player: (Uganda) Fauzia Najjemba
- Best goalkeeper: (Uganda) Daphine Nyanyenga
- Fair play award: Burundi

The 2019 CECAFA Women's U-17 Championship was the inaugural edition of the CECAFA Women's U-17 Championship, the international women's youth football championship organised by Council of East and Central Africa Football Associations (CECAFA) for the women's under-17 national teams of East Africa. The tournament took place in Kampala, Uganda.

Uganda's Crested Cranes won the tournament without a single loss, maintaining clean sheets in four out of five matches.

== Participating nations ==
Six out of 12 CECAFA's members entered the tournaments.

Team	App	Last	Best placement in the tournament
Burundi	1st	—N/a	debut
Djibouti	1st	—N/a	debut
Eritrea	1st	—N/a	debut
Kenya	1st	—N/a	debut
Tanzania	1st	—N/a	debut
Uganda	1st	—N/a	debut

Did not enter

- Ethiopia
- Rwanda
- Somalia
- South Sudan
- Sudan
- Zanzibar

== Squads ==
Players born on or after 1 January 2002 are eligible to compete in the tournament. Each team must register a squad of a minimum of 18 players and a maximum of 23 players.

== Main tournament ==
Pos	Team	Pld	W	D	L	GF	GA	GD	Pts	Final result
1	Uganda (H)	5	4	1	0	28	1	+27	13	Champions
2	Tanzania	5	3	2	0	22	5	+17	11	Runners-up
3	Kenya	5	2	1	2	19	8	+11	7	Third place
4	Burundi	5	2	1	2	17	10	+7	7	
5	Eritrea	5	1	1	3	5	20	−15	4	
6	Djibouti	5	0	0	5	0	47	−47	0	

Source: CECAFA
Rules for classification: Group stage tiebreakers
(H) Hosts
9 December 2019
11:00

Tanzania	5–0	Eritrea
Masaka 21', 40+1'; Meshack 29', 55', 62'

FUFA Technical Centre Njeru, Kampala
9 December 2019
13:30

Djibouti	0–14	Kenya
		Arusi 17', 44', 68'; Adhiambo 20', 40+1', 52', 68'; Anyango 38'; Khalai 25', 40', 43', 50', 53'; Achieng 80+1'

FUFA Technical Centre Njeru, Kampala
9 December 2019
16:00

Uganda	4–0	Burundi
Nalukenge 12', 28', 39'; Nakacwa 70'

FUFA Technical Centre Njeru, Kampala

11 December 2019

Uganda	11–0	Djibouti
Najjemba 2', 29', 31'; Musibika 4', 80+5'; Nalukenge 9', 45'; Nandago 55', 69'; Kunihira (?); Nakachwa (?)

FUFA Technical Centre Njeru, Kampala
11 December 2019

Burundi	3–3	Tanzania
Bora 37'; Kalenzo 65'; Nezohabonayo 78'	Report	Meshack 5'; Masaka 15'; Behela 47'

FUFA Technical Centre Njeru, Kampala
11 December 2019

Kenya	1–1	Eritrea
Makhungu 77'	Report	Mehari 53'

FUFA Technical Centre Njeru, Kampala

13 December 2019

Djibouti	0–8	Burundi
		Kalenzo (?); Bora (?); Nzohbonayo (?)

FUFA Technical Centre Njeru, Kampala
13 December 2019

Tanzania	3–1	Kenya
Munga 19'; Meschak 54' (pen.); Masaka 70'		Adhiambo 55'

FUFA Technical Centre Njeru, Kampala
13 December 2019

Eritrea	0–10	Uganda
		Najjemba 5', 48'; Nalukenge 13', 34', 62'; Kunihira 15'; Nagadya 22'; Musibika (?); Nakachwa 57'; Komuntale (?)

FUFA Technical Centre Njeru, Kampala

15 December 2019

Burundi	2–3	Kenya
Mutoni 5'; Kalenzo 45+1' (pen.)		Arusi 3', 16', 28'

FUFA Technical Centre Njeru, Kampala
15 December 2019

Eritrea	4–0	Djibouti
Mehari 7', 17', 21'; Goitom 10'

FUFA Technical Centre Njeru, Kampala
15 December 2019

Uganda	1–1	Tanzania
Najjemba 35' (pen.)		Masaka 22'

FUFA Technical Centre Njeru, Kampala

17 December 2019

Burundi	4–0	Eritrea
Nezohabonayo 63'; Bora 71'; Nandine 76'; Kalenzo 79'

FUFA Technical Centre Njeru, Kampala
17 December 2019

Tanzania	10–0	Djibouti
Munga 3'; Masaka 8', 9', 15', 27', 28', 30', 33'; Salum 40'; Mrema 51'

FUFA Technical Centre Njeru, Kampala
17 December 2019

Uganda	2–0	Kenya
Najjemba 31'; Nalukenge 53'

FUFA Technical Centre Njeru, Kampala

== Goalscorers ==
There were 91 goals scored in 15 matches, for an average of 6.07 goals per match.

12 goals

- (Tanzania) Aisha Masaka

9 goals

- (Uganda) Juliet Nalukenge

7 goals

- (Uganda) Fauzia Najjemba

6 goals

- (Burundi) Ineza Bora
- (Burundi) Lydia Kalenzo
- (Kenya) Anna Arusi

5 goals

- (Kenya) Fasila Adhiambo
- (Kenya) Viola Khalai
- (Tanzania) Joyce Meshack

4 goals

- (Eritrea) Misgana Mehari

3 goals

- (Burundi) Neema Nezohabonayo
- (Uganda) Stella Musibika

2 goals

- (Uganda) Hadijja Nandago
- (Uganda) Kevin Nakachwa
- (Uganda) Margret Kunihira
- (Tanzania) Thebea Munga

1 goal

- (Burundi) Ciza Nandine
- (Burundi) Stephie Mutoni
- (Eritrea) Haben Goitom
- (Kenya) Dorine Achieng
- (Kenya) Lavin Anyango
- (Kenya) Sylvia Makhungu
- (Uganda) Catherine Nagadya
- (Uganda) Samalie Nakacwa
- (Uganda) Sumaya Komuntale
- (Tanzania) Christer Behela
- (Tanzania) Lucia Mrema
- (Tanzania) Shamim Salum

Source: CECAFA
