= 2026 CECAFA Women's U-17 Championship =

Tournament details
- Host country: Tanzania
- City: Dar es Salaam
- Dates: June 13–23
- Teams: 8 (from 1 sub-confederation)
- Venues: 2 (in 1 host city)

Final positions
- Champions: Uganda (2nd title)
- Runners-up: Tanzania
- Third place: Kenya
- Fourth place: South Sudan

Tournament statistics
- Matches played: 16
- Goals scored: 83 (5.19 per match)
- Top scorer(s): (Tanzania) Bahati Kizanguzi (Note: Although Brenda Achieng scored 13 goals during the tournament, CECAFA did not count any goals from the abandoned Kenya–Sudan match towards the topscorers' rankings. The match, which ended 16–0 on the field and included seven goals by Achieng, was subsequently awarded as a 3–0 forfeiture victory to Kenya.) (10 goals)
- Best player: (Uganda) Shadia Nabirye
- Best goalkeeper: (Uganda) Mayimuna Namuwaya
- Fair play award: South Sudan

The 2026 CECAFA Women's U-17 Championship was the second edition of the CECAFA Women's U-17 Championship, the international youth football championship contested by the women's under-17 national teams of the member associations of CECAFA. The tournament took place in Dar es Salaam, Mainland Tanzania from June 13 to 23, 2026.

Uganda were the defending champions, having gone unbeaten en route to the title in the inaugural edition. They successfully retained their title, winning all of their matches and conceding no goals throughout the tournament.

== Participating teams ==
On April 15, 2026, CECAFA confirmed that eight of its 12 member associations would participate in the tournament. On 20 May 2026, CECAFA released an updated list of participants, reducing the field to seven teams following the withdrawal of Burundi. The following day, before the draw, Rwanda were replaced by South Sudan. Two days after the draw, the Zanzibar Football Association confirmed the entry of its team into Group B, restoring the tournament lineup to eight participants.

The tournament marked the debut of both Somalia and Sudan at the women's under-17 level. For Somalia, the tournament also represented the first official competition appearance by any women's national team.

Team	App.	Previous best performance
Djibouti	2nd	Sixth place (2019)
Kenya	2nd	Third place (2019)
Somalia	1st	Debut
South Sudan	1st	Debut
Sudan	1st	Debut
Tanzania	2nd	Runners-up (2019)
Uganda	2nd	Champions (2019)
Zanzibar	1st	Debut

== Group stage ==
=== Group A ===
Pos	Team	Pld	W	D	L	GF	GA	GD	Pts	Qualification
1	Tanzania (H)	3	2	1	0	15	1	+14	7	Knockout stage
2	Kenya	3	2	1	0	10	1	+9	7	Knockout stage
3	Somalia	3	1	0	2	8	12	−4	3	
4	Sudan	3	0	0	3	2	21	−19	0	

Source: CECAFA
Rules for classification: 1) Points; 2) head-to-head matches; 3) Goal difference; 4) Number of goals scored.
(H) Hosts
June 13, 2026
13:00

Kenya	3–0 (Note: The Kenya v Sudan match was abandoned at 16–0 around the one-hour mark after Sudan were reduced to six players, which is below the minimum seven required by the Laws of the Game to continue a match. The fixture was later recorded as a 3–0 win for Kenya, with Sudan deemed to have abandoned the match.)	Sudan
Achieng 6', 22', 33', 34', 35', 46', 54'; Khatenje 8'; Atieno 19', 43'; Opiyo 35', 45'; Wambui 42'; Otieno 45+3'; Bakari 45+4'; Malaz Abdallah 48' (o.g.)

KMC Stadium, Dar es Salaam
Referee: Rehema Mhina (Tanzania)
June 13, 2026
16:00

Tanzania	4–0	Somalia
Kaliwa 1'; Kizanguzi 30', 61' (pen.); Shagembe 54'

KMC Stadium, Dar es Salaam

June 15, 2026
13:00

Sudan	0–10	Tanzania
		Juma 4', 80', 85'; Kizanguzi 7', 17' (pen.), 52' (pen.), 60', 66'; John 37'; Masasila 42'

Azam Complex Stadium, Dar es Salaam
Referee: Mouna Omer
June 15, 2026
16:00

Somalia	0–6	Kenya
		Boke 15'; Achieng 17'; Okumu 23', 25'; Opiyo 63'; Mwende 83'

Azam Complex Stadium, Dar es Salaam
Referee: Anitha Kisoma (Tanzania)

June 17, 2026
13:00

Somalia	8–2	Sudan
Sundus Mohamaed 2', 32'; Maryan Osoble 8'; Halimo Isse 9'; Nagma Mohamed 24', 40', 81'; Hibo Salad 79'		Fatin Fadol 23'; Nashwa Abbas 44'

KMC Stadium, Dar es Salaam
Referee: Rehema Mhina (Tanzania)
June 17, 2026
16:00

Tanzania	1–1	Kenya
Kizanguzi 39'		Simyu 90+2'

KMC Stadium, Dar es Salaam
Referee: Patience Namayanja (Uganda)

=== Group B ===
Pos	Team	Pld	W	D	L	GF	GA	GD	Pts	Qualification
1	Uganda	3	3	0	0	20	0	+20	9	Knockout stage
2	South Sudan	3	2	0	1	7	4	+3	6	Knockout stage
3	Zanzibar	3	1	0	2	4	4	0	3	
4	Djibouti	3	0	0	3	0	23	−23	0	

Source: CECAFA
Rules for classification: 1) Points; 2) head-to-head matches; 3) Goal difference; 4) Number of goals scored.
June 14, 2026
13:00

South Sudan	1–0	Zanzibar
Amou Seber 78'

Azam Complex Stadium, Dar es Salaam
June 14, 2026
16:00

Uganda	13–0	Djibouti
Ayerango 2', 56'; Namaseruka 10' (pen.); Yagala 25'; Nabirye 18', 39', 41'; Achen 36', 49'; Nabalanzi 81'; Nakalema 87'; Atyeronimungu 89'; Nasaka 90+2'

Azam Complex Stadium, Dar es Salaam

June 16, 2026
13:00

Zanzibar	0–3	Uganda
		Nabirye 44'; Achen 58'; Ayerango 90'

KMC Stadium, Dar es Salaam
Referee: Sezerina Henry (South Sudan)
June 16, 2026
16:00

Djibouti	0–6	South Sudan
		Amou Seber 6', 38'; Marlin Yugu 32'; Hellen Opiaha 50'; Ajak Gau 72', 90+1'

KMC Stadium, Dar es Salaam

June 18, 2026
13:00

Djibouti	0–4	Zanzibar
		Federico 2' (o.g.); Mnyachusa 9'; Hamadi 47'; Hussein 69'

KMC Stadium, Dar es Salaam
June 18, 2026
16:00

Uganda	4–0	South Sudan
Nabirye 29', 62'; Ayerango 54', 73'

KMC Stadium, Dar es Salaam

== Knockout stage ==
In the knockout stage, a penalty shoot-out was used to decide the winner if necessary (no extra time was played).

=== Bracket ===
Semi-finals
June 21 - KMC
Tanzania	4
South Sudan	0
June 21 - KMC
Uganda	3
Kenya	0

Final
June 23 - KMC
Tanzania	0
Uganda	3
Third place
June 23 - KMC
South Sudan	0
Kenya	7

=== Semi-finals ===
June 21, 2026
13:00

Uganda	3–0	Kenya
Nabirye 7'; Achen 40'; Simyu 90+4' (o.g.)

KMC Stadium, Dar es Salaam

June 21, 2026
16:30

Tanzania	4–0	South Sudan
Kizanguzi 16', 78'; Juma 30'; Kaliwa 57'

KMC Stadium, Dar es Salaam
Referee: Christine Akinyi (Kenya)

=== Match for third place ===
June 23, 2026
13:00

South Sudan	0–7	Kenya
		Achieng 6', 60', 64', 77', 85'; Opiyo 44'; Boke 81'

KMC Stadium, Dar es Salaam

=== Final ===
June 23, 2026
16:30

Tanzania	0–3	Uganda
		Ayerango 38'; Nassaka 43'; Yagala 47'

KMC Stadium, Dar es Salaam
Referee: Sezerina Gabriel (South Sudan)

== Goalscorers ==
There were 96 goals scored in 16 matches, for an average of 6 goals per match.

13 goals

- (Kenya) Brenda Achieng

10 goals

- (Tanzania) Bahati Kizanguzi

7 goals

- (Uganda) Shadia Nabirye

6 goals

- (Uganda) Justine Ayerango

4 goals

- (Kenya) Elizabeth Opiyo
- (Tanzania) Harrier Juma
- (Uganda) Immaculate Achen

3 goals

- (Somalia) Nagma Mohamed
- (South Sudan) Amou Seber

2 goals

- (Kenya) Lindey Weey Atieno
- (Kenya) Faith Boke
- (Kenya) Beryl Okumu
- (Somalia) Sundus Mohamaed
- (South Sudan) Ajak Gau
- (Tanzania) Yasinta Kaliwa
- (Uganda) Brenda Nasaka
- (Uganda) Flavia Yagala

1 goal

- (Kenya) Mwanakombo Bakari
- (Kenya) Flaviah Khatenje
- (Kenya) Patience Mwende
- (Kenya) Bevarline Otieno
- (Kenya) Jael Simyu
- (Kenya) Tabitha Wambui
- (Somalia) Halimo Isse
- (Somalia) Maryan Osoble
- (Somalia) Hibo Salad
- (South Sudan) Hellen Opiaha
- (South Sudan) Marlin Yugu
- (Sudan) Nashwa Abbas
- (Sudan) Fatin Fadol
- (Tanzania) Milembe John
- (Tanzania) Sundy Masasila
- (Tanzania) Fatuma Shagembe
- (Uganda) Vicky Atyeronimungu
- (Uganda) Tracy Nabalanzi
- (Uganda) Rashida Nakalema
- (Uganda) Lydia Namaseruka
- (Zanzibar) Aziza Hamadi
- (Zanzibar) Aidda Mnyachusa
- (Zanzibar) Mariam Hussein

1 own goal

- (Djibouti) Alexandra Federico (against Zanzibar)
- (Kenya) Jael Simyu (against Uganda)
- (Sudan) Malaz Abdallah (against Kenya)

Source: CECAFA

== Final ranking and awards ==
=== Final ranking ===
Pos.	Team	G	Pld	W	D	L	Pts	GF	GA	GD
1	Uganda	B	5	5	0	0	15	26	0	+26
2	Tanzania	A	5	3	1	1	10	19	4	+15
3	Kenya	A	5	3	1	1	10	17	4	+13
4	South Sudan	B	5	2	0	3	6	7	15	−8
Eliminated in the group stage
5	Zanzibar	B	3	1	0	2	3	4	4	0
6	Somalia	A	3	1	0	2	3	8	12	−4
7	Sudan	A	3	0	0	3	0	2	21	−19
8	Djibouti	B	3	0	0	3	0	0	23	−23

=== Individual awards ===
At the conclusion of the tournament, the following awards were presented:

Top goalscorer	Best Goalkeeper	Best Player
(Tanzania) Bahati Kizanguzi	(Uganda) Mayimuna Namuwaya	(Uganda) Shadia Nabirye
Fair play Award
South Sudan
