= 2024 African U-17 Women's World Cup qualification =

9th African qualification for the FIFA U-17 Women's World Cup

Tournament details
- Dates: 8 December 2023 – 16 June 2024
- Teams: 25 (from 1 confederation)

Tournament statistics
- Matches played: 34
- Goals scored: 136 (4 per match)
- Top scorer(s): (Nigeria) Harmony Chidi (12 goals)

The 2024 African U-17 Women's World Cup qualification was the 9th edition of the African U-17 Women's World Cup qualification, the biennial international youth football competition organised by the Confederation of African Football (CAF) to determine which women's under-17 national teams from Africa qualify for the FIFA U-17 Women's World Cup. Players born on or after 1 January 2007 were eligible to compete in the tournament.

Three teams qualified from this tournament for the 2024 FIFA U-17 Women's World Cup in Dominican Republic as the CAF representatives.

== Draw ==
A total of 25 (out of 54) CAF member national teams entered the qualifying rounds. The draw was held on 8 June 2023 at the CAF headquarters in Cairo, Egypt. The draw procedures were as follows:

- In the first round, the 2 lowest ranked teams played against each other:
- Mauritius
- Central African Republic
- In the second round, the first round winner will play against the top ranked team (Nigeria). The 22 other teams receiving byes to the second round were allocated into eleven ties.
- In the third round, the twelve second round winners were allocated into six ties based on the second round tie numbers.
- In the fourth round, the six third round winners were allocated into three ties based on the third round tie numbers.

=== Table ===
Second round entrants (23 teams)
Pot A (6 from CECAFA)	Pot B (3 from COSAFA) and (3 from UNIFFAC)	Pot C (3 from UNAF)	Pot D (8 from WAFU)
Ethiopia; Uganda; Kenya; Djibouti; Burundi; Tanzania	Cameroon; DR Congo; Equatorial Guinea; Zambia; Botswana; South Africa	Algeria; Morocco; Libya	Nigeria; Burkina Faso; Niger; Benin; Guinea; Liberia; Senegal; Mali

Notes

- Teams in **bold** qualified for the group stage.
- (W): Withdrew after the draw

=== Did not enter ===
- Angola
- Cape Verde
- Chad
- Comoros
- Congo
- Egypt
- Eritrea
- Eswatini
- Gabon
- Gambia
- Ghana
- Guinea-Bissau
- Ivory Coast
- Lesotho
- Madagascar
- Malawi
- Mauritania
- Mozambique
- Namibia
- Rwanda
- São Tomé and Príncipe
- Seychelles
- Sierra Leone
- Somalia
- South Sudan
- Sudan
- Togo
- Tunisia
- Zimbabwe

== Format ==
Qualification ties were played on a home-and-away two-legged basis. If the aggregate score was tied after the second leg, the away goals rule was applied, and if still tied, the penalty shoot-out (no extra time) was used to determine the winner.

== Schedule ==
Round	Leg	Date
First round	First leg	8–10 December 2023
First round	Second leg	15–17 December 2023
Second round	First leg	3–6 February 2024
Second round	Second leg	9–11 February 2024
Third round	First leg	10–12 May 2024
Third round	Second leg	15–19 May 2024
Fourth round	First leg	7–9 June 2024
Fourth round	Second leg	14–16 June 2024

== Bracket ==
The three winners of the fourth round will qualify for the 2024 FIFA U-17 Women's World Cup.

Second round
Djibouti	—	—	w/o
Equatorial Guinea	—	—
Burundi	4	2	6
Botswana	1	0	1
Ethiopia	3	0	3
South Africa	0	0	0
DR Congo	—	—
Kenya	—	—	w/o

Third round
Djibouti	0	0	0
Burundi	18	6	24
Ethiopia	0	0	0
Kenya	0	3	3

Fourth round
Burundi	0	0	0
Kenya	3	2	5

Second round
Zambia	5	0	5
Tanzania	0	1	1
Uganda	1	3	4
Cameroon	1	1	2
Niger	0	0	0
Morocco	11	11	22
Benin	2	0	2 (7)
Algeria (p)	0	2	2 (8)

Third round
Zambia	2	0	2
Uganda	0	1	1
Morocco	4	4	8
Algeria	0	0	0

Fourth round
Zambia	3	0	3
Morocco	1	0	1

Second round
Libya	—	—
Senegal	—	—	w/o
Liberia	—	—	w/o
Mali	—	—
Burkina Faso	4	2	6
Guinea	1	1	2
Central African Republic	0	0	0
Nigeria	6	6	12

Third round
Senegal	3	0	3
Liberia (a)	1	2	3
Burkina Faso	1	0	1
Nigeria	1	6	7

Fourth round
Liberia	1	0	1
Nigeria	4	2	6

== First round ==
Team 1	Agg.	Team 2	1st leg	2nd leg
Central African Republic	w/o	Mauritius	–	–

December 2023

Central African Republic	Cancelled	Mauritius

December 2023

Mauritius	Cancelled	Central African Republic

Central African Republic won on walkover and advanced to the Second round after Mauritius withdrew before the first leg.

== Second round ==
Team 1	Agg.	Team 2	1st leg	2nd leg
Central African Republic	0–12	Nigeria	0–6	0–6
Djibouti	w/o	Equatorial Guinea	—	—
Ethiopia	3–0	South Africa	3–0	0–0
Zambia	5–1	Tanzania	5–0	0–1
Niger	0–22	Morocco	0–11	0–11
Libya	w/o	Senegal	—	—
Burkina Faso	6–2	Guinea	4–1	2–1
Burundi	6–1	Botswana	4–1	2–0
DR Congo	w/o	Kenya	—	—
Uganda	4–2	Cameroon	1–1	3–1
Benin	2–2 (7–8 p)	Algeria	2–0	0–2
Liberia	w/o	Mali	—	—

4 February 2024
15:00 UTC+1

Central African Republic	0–6	Nigeria
	Report	Chidi 5', 42'; Nwachukwu 39'; Moshood 45', 72'; Etim 57'

Stade de la Réunification, Douala (Cameroon)
10 February 2024
--:-- UTC+1

Nigeria	6–0	Central African Republic
Chidi 2', 13', 90+3'; Ojiyovwi 36'; Kareem 55', 85'	Report

Moshood Abiola National Stadium, Abuja

Nigeria won 12–0 on aggregate.

February 2024

Djibouti	Cancelled	Equatorial Guinea

February 2024

Equatorial Guinea	Cancelled	Djibouti

Djibouti won on walkover and advanced to the third round after Equatorial Guinea withdrew before the first leg.

4 February 2024
15:00 UTC+3

Ethiopia	3–0	South Africa
Tefsaye 10'; Kassu 19', 72'	Report

Abebe Bikila Stadium, Addis Ababa
10 February 2024
--:-- UTC+2

South Africa	0–0	Ethiopia
	Report

Lucas Moripe Stadium, Pretoria

Ethiopia won 3–0 on aggregate.

3 February 2024
15:00 UTC+2

Zambia	5–0	Tanzania
Mwanza 23'; B. Zulu 27', 45+2'; Namute Chileshe 75'; Muwowo 90+2'	Report

Nkoloma Stadium, Lusaka
11 February 2024
19:00 UTC+3

Tanzania	1–0	Zambia
Juma 2'	Report

Azam Complex Stadium, Dar es Salaam

Zambia won 5–1 on aggregate.

5 February 2024
17:00 UTC+1

Niger	0–11	Morocco
	Report; Report (FRMF)	Bentahri 19'; Senhaji 26'; El Ghazouani 31'; Mokhtar Jamaï 32', 34', 45+3', 46', 90+5'; Aboucharif 51'; Bouhouch 55'; Dofry 90'

Stade Municipal de Berkane, Berkane (Morocco)
9 February 2024
17:00 UTC+1

Morocco	11–0	Niger
Layachi 3'; El Mesmoudi 8'; Kallouch 23', 80'; Boushaba 29', 66', 68'; Ihssan 36'; Erremli 45' (pen.); Djibou 56' (o.g.); Mokhtar Jamaï 78'	Report; Report (FRMF)

Stade Municipal de Berkane, Berkane

Morocco won 22–0 on aggregate.

February 2024

Libya	Cancelled	Senegal

February 2024

Senegal	Cancelled	Libya

Senegal won on walkover and advanced to the third round after Libya withdrew before the first leg.

4 February 2024
16:00 UTC+0

Burkina Faso	4–1	Guinea
Kouanda (??); Gloria	Report	Nabe (??)

Stade du 26 Mars, Bamako (Mali)
9 February 2024
16:00 UTC+0

Guinea	1–2	Burkina Faso
D. Camara 42'	Report	Kouanda (??); Rouamba (??)

Stade du 26 Mars, Bamako (Mali)

Burkina Faso won 6–2 on aggregate.

6 February 2024
15:00 UTC+2

Burundi	4–1	Botswana
Habonimana (??); R. Nzoyikorera (??); Gakima (??)	Report	Dilelo 76'

National Stadium, Gaborone (Botswana)
9 February 2024
15:00 UTC+2

Botswana	0–2	Burundi
	Report

National Stadium, Gaborone

Burundi won 6–1 on aggregate.

4 February 2024

DR Congo	Cancelled	Kenya

11 February 2024

Kenya	Cancelled	DR Congo

Kenya won on walkover and advanced to the third round after DR Congo withdrew before the first leg.

3 February 2024
16:00 UTC+3

Uganda	1–1	Cameroon
Nabukenya 34'	Report	Heutchou 50'

St. Mary's Stadium-Kitende, Entebbe
Referee: Lamia Athmane (Algeria)
9 February 2024
15:00 UTC+1

Cameroon	1–3	Uganda
Lemana 90+2'	Report	Kabene 23'; Nangendo 26'; Nabukenya 90+5'

Stade de Ngoa-Ekellé, Yaoundé

Uganda won 4–2 on aggregate

4 February 2024
14:00 UTC+1

Benin	2–0	Algeria
Honfo 48'; Toudonou 83' (pen.)	Report; Report (FAF)

Stade de l'Amitié, Cotonou
9 February 2024
17:00 UTC+1

Algeria	2–0	Benin
Aït El Kadi 64'; Rebbahi 74'	Report; Report (FAF)
Penalties
	8–7

Stade du 5 Juillet, Algiers

2–2 on aggregate. Algeria won 8–7 on penalties.

February 2024

Liberia	Cancelled	Mali

February 2024

Mali	Cancelled	Liberia

Liberia won on walkover and advanced to the third round after Mali withdrew before the first leg.

== Third round ==
Team 1	Agg.	Team 2	1st leg	2nd leg
Djibouti	0–24	Burundi	0–18	0–6
Ethiopia	0–3	Kenya	0–0	0–3
Zambia	2–1	Uganda	2–0	0–1
Morocco	8–0	Algeria	4–0	4–0
Senegal	3–3 (a)	Liberia	3–1	0–2
Burkina Faso	1–7	Nigeria	1–1	0–6

12 May 2024
14:00 UTC+3

Djibouti	0–18	Burundi
	Report	R. Nzoyikorera 1', 11', 34', 45', 48', 72'; Akimana 3', 68'; Habonimana 7', 52', 57', 66', 70', 82', 86'; Nibogora 15'; Majura 61'; Kamikazi 90+7'

Abebe Bikila Stadium, Addis Ababa (Ethiopia)
15 May 2024
14:00 UTC+3

Burundi	6–0	Djibouti
	Report

Abebe Bikila Stadium, Addis Ababa (Ethiopia)

Burundi won 24–0 on aggregate.

10 May 2024
15:00 UTC+3

Ethiopia	0–0	Kenya
	Report

Abebe Bikila Stadium, Addis Ababa
19 May 2024
15:00 UTC+3

Kenya	3–0	Ethiopia
Ochakaa 44'; Awuor 55'; Faith 70'	Report

Ulinzi Sports Complex, Nairobi

Kenya won 3–0 on aggregate.

12 May 2024
12:30 UTC+2

Zambia	2–0	Uganda
Namute Chileshe 2'; Mukoma 70'	Report

Nkoloma Stadium, Lusaka
17 May 2024
16:00 UTC+3

Uganda	1–0	Zambia
Kabene 73'	Report

St. Mary's Stadium-Kitende, Entebbe

Zambia won 2–1 on aggregate.

10 May 2024
20:00 UTC+1

Morocco	4–0	Algeria
Aboucharif 32'; Ihssan 41'; Bentahri 50'; Sehoul 58' (o.g.)	Report; Report (FRMF)

Berkane Municipal Stadium, Berkane
Referee: Patience Ndidi Madu (Nigeria)
17 May 2024
17:30 UTC+1

Algeria	0–4	Morocco
	Report	Boughazi 6'; Mokhtar Jamaï 62', 79'; Haizoun 76'

Salem Mabrouki Stadium, Algiers

Morocco won 8–0 on aggregate.

11 May 2024
17:00 UTC+0

Senegal	3–1	Liberia
Sarr 17', 24'; Faty 50'	Report	Brown 90+3' (pen.)

Stade Lat-Dior, Thiès
19 May 2024
16:00 UTC+0

Liberia	2–0	Senegal
Brown 45+3'; Glao 54'	Report

Samuel Kanyon Doe Sports Complex, Monrovia

3–3 on aggregate. Liberia won on away goals.

11 May 2024
16:00 UTC+0

Burkina Faso	1–1	Nigeria
Oubda 85'	Report	Chidi 55'

Stade du 26 Mars, Bamako (Mali)
18 May 2024
16:30 UTC+1

Nigeria	6–0	Burkina Faso
Chidi 11', 74', 86'; Effiong 34', 90'; Kareem 84'	Report

Moshood Abiola National Stadium, Abuja

Nigeria won 7–1 on aggregate.

== Fourth round ==
Team 1	Agg.	Team 2	1st leg	2nd leg
Burundi	0–5	Kenya	0–3	0–2
Zambia	3–1	Morocco	3–1	0–0
Liberia	1–6	Nigeria	1–4	0–2

9 June 2024
15:00 UTC+3

Burundi	0–3	Kenya
	Report	Faith 11'; Serenge 43'; Akoth 71'

Abebe Bikila Stadium, Addis Ababa (Ethiopia)
16 June 2024
15:00 UTC+3

Kenya	2–0	Burundi
Serenge 17'; Nekesa 21'	Report

Ulinzi Sports Complex, Nairobi

Kenya won 5–0 on aggregate.

8 June 2024
15:00 UTC+2

Zambia	3–1	Morocco
Chileshe 12', 25', 81'	Report	Azraf 37'

Nkoloma Stadium, Lusaka
Referee: Joselyne Nsabimana (Burundi)
15 June 2024
21:00 UTC+1

Morocco	0–0	Zambia
	Report

Berkane Municipal Stadium, Berkane
Referee: Shamirah Nabadda (Uganda)

Zambia won 3–1 on aggregate.

9 June 2024
16:00 UTC+0

Liberia	1–4	Nigeria
Gwaikolo 87'	Report	Moshood 19'; Effiong 29'; Chidi 36'; Ifitezue 74'

Samuel Kanyon Doe Sports Complex, Monrovia
14 June 2024
16:00 UTC+1

Nigeria	2–0	Liberia
Chidi 3', 64'	Report

Moshood Abiola National Stadium, Abuja

Nigeria won 6–1 on aggregate.

== Qualified teams for the 2024 FIFA U-17 Women's World Cup ==
The following three teams from CAF will qualify for the 2024 FIFA U-17 Women's World Cup in the Dominican Republic.

Team	Qualified on	Previous appearances in the FIFA U-17 Women's World Cup
Nigeria	14 June 2024	6 (2008, 2010, 2012, 2014, 2016, 2022)
Zambia	15 June 2024	1 (2014)
Kenya	16 June 2024	0 (debut)

== Goalscorers ==
There were 136 goals scored in 34 matches, for an average of 4 goals per match.

12 goals

- (Nigeria) Harmony Chidi

8 goals

- (Burundi) Espérance Habonimana
- (Burundi) Roy Nzoyikorera
- (Morocco) Lina Mokhtar Jamaï

3 goals

- (Burkina Faso) Salamatu Kouanda
- (Morocco) Laila Boushaba
- (Nigeria) Ramota Kareem
- (Nigeria) Shakirat Moshood
- (Nigeria) Peace Effiong
- (Zambia) Namute Chileshe

2 goals

- (Burundi) Chanceline Akimana
- (Ethiopia) Hidat Kassu
- (Liberia) Louise Brown
- (Morocco) Inès Aboucharif
- (Morocco) Ouafae Bentahri
- (Morocco) Romaissa Ihssan
- (Morocco) Amira Kallouch
- (Senegal) Marie Louise Sarr
- (Uganda) Sylvia Kabene
- (Uganda) Agnes Nabukenya
- (Zambia) Bwalya Namute Chileshe
- (Zambia) Blessing Zulu

1 goal

- (Algeria) Nora Aït El Kadi
- (Algeria) Zaza Rebbahi
- (Benin) Germaine Honfo
- (Benin) Fidèle Toudonou
- (Botswana) Lebogang Dilelo
- (Burkina Faso) Gloria
- (Burkina Faso) Salamata Kouanda
- (Burkina Faso) Rainata Oubda
- (Burkina Faso) Oumou Rouamba
- (Burundi) Gloris Gakima
- (Burundi) Nellysa Kamikazi
- (Burundi) Joséphine Majura
- (Burundi) Ange Nice Nibogora
- (Burundi) ??
- (Burundi) ??
- (Burundi) ??
- (Burundi) ??
- (Burundi) ??
- (Burundi) ??
- (Burundi) ??
- (Burundi) ??
- (Cameroon) Ernestine Heutchou
- (Cameroon) Sophie Lemana
- (Ethiopia) Menayesh Tefsaye
- (Guinea) Djenab Camara
- (Guinea) Fanta Nabe
- (Kenya) Velma Awuor
- (Kenya) Lornah Faith
- (Kenya) Elizabeth Ochakaa
- (Kenya) Lorna Faith
- (Kenya) Marion Serenge
- (Kenya) Susan Akoth
- (Kenya) Marion Serenge
- (Kenya) Valerie Nekesa
- (Liberia) Dalphine Glao
- (Liberia) Yassah Gwaikolo
- (Morocco) Chaimae Boughazi
- (Morocco) Siham Bouhouch
- (Morocco) Sara Dofry
- (Morocco) Awatif El Ghazouani
- (Morocco) Dounia El Mesmoudi
- (Morocco) Khadija Erremli
- (Morocco) Dina Nassira Haizoun
- (Morocco) Meyssane Layachi
- (Morocco) Salma Senhaji
- (Morocco) kautar Azraf
- (Nigeria) Edidiong Etim
- (Nigeria) Prisca Nwachukwu
- (Nigeria) Kesiena Tessy Ojiyovwi
- (Nigeria) Blessing Ifitezue
- (Senegal) Mariama Faty
- (Tanzania) Melkia Juma
- (Uganda) Esther Nangendo
- (Zambia) Ruth Mukoma
- (Zambia) Ruth Muwowo
- (Zambia) Saliya Mwanza

1 own goal

- (Algeria) Hannane Sehoul (against Morocco)
- (Niger) Zakou Djibou (against Morocco)

== See also ==
- 2024 Women's Africa Cup of Nations
- 2024 African U-20 Women's World Cup qualification
