= 2022 African U-17 Women's World Cup qualification =

8th African qualification for the FIFA U-17 Women's World Cup

Tournament details
- Dates: 13 January – 5 June
- Teams: 29 (from 1 confederation)

Tournament statistics
- Matches played: 30
- Goals scored: 107 (3.57 per match)
- Top scorer: (Tanzania) Clara Luvanga (10 goals)

The 2022 African U-17 Women's World Cup qualification was the 8th edition of the African U-17 Women's World Cup qualification, the biennial international youth football competition organised by the Confederation of African Football (CAF) to determine which women's under-17 national teams from Africa qualify for the FIFA U-17 Women's World Cup. Players born on or after 1 January 2005 were eligible to compete in the tournament.

Three teams qualified from this tournament for the 2022 FIFA U-17 Women's World Cup in India as the CAF representatives.

== Draw ==
A total of 29 (out of 54) CAF member national teams entered the qualifying rounds. The draw was held on 10 May 2021 at the CAF headquarters in Cairo, Egypt. The draw procedures were as follows:

- In the first round, the 10 teams were drawn into five ties, with teams divided into four pots based on their geographical zones and those in the same pot drawn to play against each other.
- In the second round, the five first round winners and the 19 teams receiving byes to the second round were allocated into twelve ties based on the first round tie numbers, with five first round winners playing against the five teams receiving byes, and the other four first round winners playing against each other.
- In the third round, the twelve second round winners were allocated into six ties based on the second round tie numbers.
- In the fourth round, the six third round winners were allocated into three ties based on the third round tie numbers.

=== Table ===
First round entrants (29 teams)
Pot A (8 from CECAFA)	Pot B (4 from COSAFA + 1 from CECAFA)	Pot C (2 from UNAF)	Pot D (4 from UNIFFAC)	Pot E (6 from WAFU A)	Pot F (4 from WAFU B)
Ethiopia; Uganda; South Sudan; Eritrea; Kenya; Djibouti; Burundi; Rwanda	Zambia; **Tanzania**; Namibia; Botswana; South Africa	Egypt; **Morocco**	Equatorial Guinea; DR Congo; São Tomé and Príncipe; Cameroon	Sierra Leone; Senegal; Mauritania; Guinea; Guinea-Bissau; Liberia	**Nigeria**; Benin; Niger; Ghana

Notes

- Teams in **bold** qualified for the group stage.
- (W): Withdrew after the draw

=== Did not enter ===
- Algeria
- Angola
- Burkina Faso
- Cape Verde
- Central African Republic
- Chad
- Comoros
- Congo
- Zimbabwe
- Eswatini
- Gabon
- Gambia
- Ivory Coast
- Lesotho
- Libya
- Madagascar
- Malawi
- Mali
- Mauritius
- Mozambique
- Seychelles
- Somalia
- Sudan
- Togo
- Tunisia

== Format ==
Qualification ties were played on a home-and-away two-legged basis. If the aggregate score was tied after the second leg, the away goals rule was applied, and if still tied, the penalty shoot-out (no extra time) was used to determine the winner.

== Schedule ==
Round	Leg	Date
First round	First leg	13–15 January 2022
First round	Second leg	27–29 January 2022
Second round	First leg	3–5 March 2022
Second round	Second leg	17–19 March 2022
Third round	First leg	15–17 April 2022
Third round	Second leg	29 April–1 May 2022
Fourth round	First leg	20–22 May 2022
Fourth round	Second leg	4–5 June 2022

== First round ==
Team 1	Agg.	Team 2	1st leg	2nd leg
Eritrea	w/o	South Sudan	—	—
Equatorial Guinea	w/o	Kenya	—	—
DR Congo	w/o	Rwanda	—	—
Senegal	w/o	Sierra Leone	—	—
Benin	w/o	Mauritania	—	—

== Second round ==
Team 1	Agg.	Team 2	1st leg	2nd leg
Eritrea	w/o	Cameroon	—	—
Zambia	w/o	Namibia	—	—
Djibouti	w/o	Burundi	—	—
Tanzania	11–0	Botswana	7–0	4–0
Kenya	w/o (Note: Kenya were disqualified as they were suspended by FIFA.)	South Africa	—	—
Uganda	3–3 (a)	Ethiopia	2–2	1–1
Egypt	w/o	Guinea-Bissau	—	—
DR Congo	0–8	Nigeria	0–3	0–5
Liberia	3–9	Guinea	2–2	1–7
Senegal	0–4	Ghana	0–1	0–3
Niger	w/o	São Tomé and Príncipe	—	—
Benin	1–3	Morocco	1–1	0–2

Notes:

6 March 2022
16:00 UTC+3

Tanzania	7–0	Botswana
Paul 3', 33'; Luvanga 40', 82'; Juma 44', 55', 69'	Report

Amaan Stadium, Zanzibar City
Referee: Elizabeth Louis (South Sudan)
20 March 2022
16:00 UTC+2

Botswana	0–4	Tanzania
	Report	Paul 32'; Luvanga 64', 68', 83'

Obed Itani Chilume Stadium, Francistown
Referee: Nonjabulo Ndlela (South Africa)

Tanzania won 11–0 on aggregate.

4 March 2022
16:00 UTC+3

Uganda	2–2	Ethiopia
Nandago 68', 72'	Report	Daniel 77'; Ahmed 90+1'

St Mary's Stadium, Entebbe
Referee: Majda Hajjana (Sudan)
20 March 2022
16:00 UTC+3

Ethiopia	1–1	Uganda
Wondemu 88'	Report	Nyinagahirwa 34'

Abebe Bikila Stadium, Addis Ababa
Referee: Aline Umutoni (Rwanda)

3–3 on aggregate. Ethiopia won on away goals.

6 March 2022
15:30 UTC+1

DR Congo	0–3	Nigeria
	Report	Emmanuel 36'; Adeshina 66'; Ajakaye 76'

Stade des Martyrs, Kinshasa
Referee: Lamngar Lare (Chad)
19 March 2022
16:00 UTC+1

Nigeria	5–0	DR Congo
Ajakaye 5', 14'; Adeshina 23'; Atume 62'; Afolabi 88'	Report

Samuel Ogbemudia Stadium, Benin City
Referee: Laurande Offin (Benin)

Nigeria won 8–0 on aggregate.

6 March 2022
16:00 UTC+0

Liberia	2–2	Guinea
Fatomah 25'; Kromah 51'	Report	F. Sidibé 16'; Samoura 48' (pen.)

Antoinette Tubman Stadium, Monrovia
Referee: Aïssata Boudy Lam (Mauritania)
20 March 2022
16:00 UTC+0

Guinea	7–1	Liberia
Diop 4'; Samoura 6', 43'; S. Sidibé 48'; F. Sidibé 54'; Fancinadouno 62'; M. Camara (?)	Report	Quachie 33'

General Lansana Conté Stadium, Conakry

Guinea won 9–3 on aggregate.

5 March 2022
16:30 UTC+0

Senegal	0–1	Ghana
	Report	Owusu 87'

Stade Lat-Dior, Thiès
Referee: Sylvina Garnett (Liberia)
20 March 2022
15:00 UTC+0

Ghana	3–0	Senegal
Aoyem 49'; Owusu 58'; Karina 73'	Report

Accra Sports Stadium, Accra
Referee: Naffisa Sani (Niger)

Ghana won 4–0 on aggregate.

6 March 2022
17:00 UTC+1

Benin	1–1	Morocco
Djibril 23'	Report	Zouhir 12'

Stade Charles de Gaulle, Porto-Novo
Referee: Edoh Kindedji (Togo)
19 March 2022
17:00 UTC+1

Morocco	2–0	Benin
El Hamzaoui 15'; Zouhir 25'	Report

Stade Moulay Hassan, Rabat
Referee: Shahenda El-Maghrabi (Egypt)

Morocco won 3–1 on aggregate.

== Third round ==
Team 1	Agg.	Team 2	1st leg	2nd leg
Zambia	0–5	Cameroon	0–2	0–3
Burundi	2–5	Tanzania	0–4	2–1
South Africa	1–3	Ethiopia	0–3	1–0
Nigeria	6–0	Egypt	4–0	2–0
Guinea	1–10	Ghana	1–3	0–7
Niger	0–18	Morocco	0–11	0–7

15 April 2022
15:00 UTC+2

Zambia	0–2	Cameroon
	Report	Lamine 48'; Daha 68'

Nkoloma Stadium, Lusaka
30 April 2022
15:30 UTC+1

Cameroon	3–0	Zambia
Daha 23', 88'; Lamine 33'	Report

Ahmadou Ahidjo Stadium, Yaoundé
Referee: Richy Nganda (Gabon)

Cameroon won 5–0 on aggregate.

16 April 2022
15:00 UTC+2

Burundi	0–4	Tanzania
	Report	Luvanga 32', 74'; Paul 52'; Mpanja 88'

Stade Urukundo, Ngozi
1 May 2022
20:30 UTC+3

Tanzania	1–2	Burundi
Gabriel 15'	Report	Gakima 22'; Bizimana 86'

Amaan Stadium, Zanzibar City
Referee: Aline Umutoni (Rwanda)

Tanzania won 5–2 on aggregate.

15 April 2022
15:00 UTC+2

South Africa	0–3	Ethiopia
	Report	Wondemu 15'; Daniel 58'; Kassa 90+2'

Bidvest Stadium, Johannesburg
Referee: Antsino Twanyanyukwa (Namibia)
1 May 2022
16:00 UTC+3

Ethiopia	0–1	South Africa
	Report	Mibe 34'

Abebe Bikila Stadium, Addis Ababa

Ethiopia won 3–1 on aggregate.

17 April 2022
16:00 UTC+1

Nigeria	4–0	Egypt
Ajakaye 28'; Bello 38', 62'; Usani 54'	Report

Moshood Abiola National Stadium, Abuja
Referee: Natacha Konan (Ivory Coast)
30 April 2022
22:00 UTC+2

Egypt	0–2	Nigeria
	Report	Ajakaye 5'; Bello 14'

Petro Sport Stadium, Cairo
Referee: Isatou Touray (Gambia)

Nigeria won 6–0 on aggregate.

16 April 2022
16:00 UTC+0

Guinea	1–3	Ghana
N. Camara 38'	Report	Aoyem 13'; Shahadu 31'; Maltiti 59'

General Lansana Conté Stadium, Conakry
30 April 2022
15:00 UTC+0

Ghana	7–0	Guinea
Amoh 12', 29'; Aoyem 18'; Kubura 49'; Amponsah 53'; Agyemang 70', 81'	Report

Cape Coast Sports Stadium, Cape Coast
Referee: Lamia Atman (Algeria)

Ghana won 10–1 on aggregate.

16 April 2022
17:00 UTC+1

Niger	0–11	Morocco
	Report	Cherif 9', 54', 66', 78'; El Madani 20', 30'; Zouhir 45', 60', 74'; Khelifi 88'; Sioui 90+2'

Stade Général Seyni Kountché, Niamey
Referee: Hannah Elaigwu (Nigeria)
29 April 2022
21:30 UTC+0

Morocco	7–0	Niger
Karimi 7'; Azizi 17'; El Madani 24'; Laksiri 45+1', 81'; Khelifi 70'; El Hannachi 87'	Report

Stade Moulay Hassan, Rabat
Referee: Joyce Appiah (Ghana)

Morocco won 18–0 on aggregate.

== Fourth round ==
Team 1	Agg.	Team 2	1st leg	2nd leg
Cameroon	1–5	Tanzania	1–4	0–1
Ethiopia	0–1	Nigeria	0–1	0–0
Ghana	2–2 (2–4 p)	Morocco	2–0	0–2

22 May 2022
15:30 UTC+1

Cameroon	1–4	Tanzania
Ngaseh 21'	Report	Mnally 4'; Luvanga 27', 64', 72'

Ahmadou Ahidjo Stadium, Yaoundé
Referee: Lamia Atman (Algeria)
5 June 2022
15:00 UTC+3

Tanzania	1–0	Cameroon
Paul 50'	Report

Amaan Stadium, Zanzibar
Referee: Aurore Ligan (Benin)

Tanzania won 5–1 on aggregate.

20 May 2022
16:00 UTC+3

Ethiopia	0–1	Nigeria
	Report	Ajakaye 36'

Abebe Bikila Stadium, Addis Ababa
Referee: Antsino Twanyanyukwa (Namibia)
4 June 2022
16:00 UTC+1

Nigeria	0–0	Ethiopia
	Report

Moshood Abiola National Stadium, Abuja
Referee: Mame Coumba Faye (Senegal)

Nigeria won 1–0 on aggregate.

20 May 2022
15:00 UTC+0

Ghana	2–0	Morocco
Nyamekye 18'; Amoh 65'	Report

Accra Sports Stadium, Accra
Referee: Suavis Iratunga (Burundi)
4 June 2022
20:00 UTC+1

Morocco	2–0	Ghana
El Ghazouani 15'; Masnaoui 47'	Report
Penalties
Penalty scored Penalty missed	4–2	Penalty scored Penalty missed

Stade Moulay Hassan, Rabat
Referee: Aïssata Boudy Lam (Mauritania)

2–2 on aggregate. Morocco won 4–2 on penalties.

== Qualified teams for the 2022 FIFA U-17 Women's World Cup ==
The following three teams from CAF qualified for the 2022 FIFA U-17 Women's World Cup in India.

Team	Qualified on	Previous appearances in the FIFA U-17 Women's World Cup
Nigeria	4 June 2022	5 (2008, 2010, 2012, 2014, 2016)
Morocco	4 June 2022	0 (debut)
Tanzania	5 June 2022	0 (debut)

== Goalscorers ==
There were 107 goals scored in 30 matches, for an average of 3.57 goals per match.

10 goals

- (Tanzania) Clara Luvanga

6 goals

- (Nigeria) Opeyemi Ajakaye

5 goals

- (Morocco) Yasmine Zouhir
- (Tanzania) Neema Paul

4 goals

- (Morocco) Djennah Cherif

3 goals

- (Cameroon) Camila Daha
- (Ghana) Nancy Amoh
- (Ghana) Georgina Aoyem
- (Guinea) Fatoumata Samoura
- (Morocco) Doha El Madani
- (Nigeria) Omowunmi Bello
- (Tanzania) Aisha Juma

2 goals

- (Cameroon) Mana Lamine
- (Ethiopia) Emush Daniel
- (Ethiopia) Eyrus Wondemu
- (Ghana) Constance Agyemang
- (Ghana) Princess Owusu
- (Guinea) Fanta Sidibé
- (Morocco) Maysane Khelifi
- (Morocco) Kenza Laksiri
- (Nigeria) Oluwatunmininu Adeshina
- (Uganda) Hadijah Nandago

1 goal

- (Benin) Yasminath Djibril
- (Burundi) Rukiya Bizimana
- (Burundi) Estella Gakima
- (Cameroon) Bernadette Ngaseh
- (Ethiopia) Semira Ahmed
- (Ethiopia) Kumneger Kassa
- (Ghana) Mary Amponsah
- (Ghana) Abdulai Karina
- (Ghana) Dejean Kubura
- (Ghana) Mariam Maltiti
- (Ghana) Stella Nyamekye
- (Ghana) Rasheeda Shahadu
- (Guinea) Mafering Camara
- (Guinea) Nana Camara
- (Guinea) Salematou Diop
- (Guinea) Maman Fancinadouno
- (Guinea) Saran Sidibé
- (Liberia) Hawa Fatomah
- (Liberia) Zeta Kromah
- (Liberia) Jessica Quachie
- (Morocco) Douae Azizi
- (Morocco) Fatima El Ghazouani
- (Morocco) Mina El Hamzaoui
- (Morocco) Iman El Hannachi
- (Morocco) Hiba Karimi
- (Morocco) Samya Masnaoui
- (Morocco) Yasmine Sioui
- (Nigeria) Taiwo Afolabi
- (Nigeria) Doosur Atume
- (Nigeria) Blessing Emmanuel
- (Nigeria) Miracle Usani
- (South Africa) Andrielle Mibe
- (Tanzania) Veronica Gabriel
- (Tanzania) Diana Mnally
- (Tanzania) Husna Mpanja
- (Uganda) Shakira Nyinagahirwa

== See also ==
- 2022 Women's Africa Cup of Nations
- 2022 African U-20 Women's World Cup qualification
