= CECAFA Women's U-17 Championship =

Football competition

- Organiser(s): CECAFA
- Founded: 2019; 7 years ago
- Region: East and Central Africa
- Teams: 12 (maximum)
- Related competitions: CECAFA U-17 Championship; CECAFA Women's U-20 Championship
- Current champions: Uganda (2nd title)
- Most championships: Uganda (2 titles)
- 2026 CECAFA Women's U-17 Championship

The CECAFA Women's U-17 Championship is a football (soccer) tournament in Africa. It is organised by the Council of East and Central Africa Football Associations (CECAFA), and includes women's national under 17 teams from Central and East Africa.

== Results ==
| Ed. | Year | Hosts | Final | | | Third place match | | | Num. teams |
| Ed. | Year | Hosts | (gold) Champions | Score | (silver) Runners-up | (bronze) Third place | Score | Fourth place | Num. teams |
|---|---|---|---|---|---|---|---|---|---|
| 1 | 2019 | Uganda | Uganda | Round; Robin | Tanzania | Kenya | Round; Robin | Burundi | 6 |
| 2 | 2026 | Tanzania | Uganda | 3–0 | Tanzania | Kenya | 7–0 | South Sudan | 8 |

== Comprehensive team results by tournament ==
Legend

- 1st – Champions
- 2nd – Runners-up
- 3rd – Third place
- 4th – Fourth place
- GS – Group stage
- P — Participating in the upcoming tournament
- × – Did not enter
- •• – Withdrew
- – Hosts

| Team | (Uganda) 2019 (6) | (Tanzania) 2026 (8) | Years |
|---|---|---|---|
| Burundi | 4th | × | 1 |
| Djibouti | 6th | GS | 2 |
| Eritrea | 5th | × | 1 |
| Ethiopia | × | × | 0 |
| Kenya | 3rd | 3rd | 2 |
| Rwanda | × | × | 0 |
| Somalia | × | GS | 1 |
| South Sudan | × | 4th | 1 |
| Sudan | × | GS | 1 |
| Tanzania | 2nd | 2nd | 2 |
| Uganda | 1st | 1st | 2 |
| Zanzibar | × | GS | 1 |
