= Morocco women's national under-17 football team =

Morocco women's U-17
- Nickname: Atlas Lionesses
- Association: Royal Moroccan Football Federation
- Confederation: CAF (Africa)
- Head coach: Youness Rabi
- FIFA code: MAR
First colours	Second colours

First international
- Morocco 0–4 Ghana (Morocco; 12 March 2016)

Biggest win
- Niger 0–11 Morocco (Morocco; 5 February 2024)

Biggest defeat
- Portugal 8–0 Morocco (Portugal; 20 September 2022)

FIFA U-17 Women's World Cup
- Appearances: 3 (first in 2022)
- Best result: Round of 16 (2025, 2026)

African U-17 Cup of Nations for Women
- Appearances: 5 (first in 2013)
- Best result: Qualified for the World Cup (2022)

Morocco women's national under-17 football team, also nicknamed the Atlas Lionesses is a youth Women's association football team operated under the auspices of Royal Moroccan Football Federation. Its primary role is the development of players in preparation for the senior Morocco women's national football team. In June 2022, The team qualified for the FIFA U-17 Women's World Cup which would be held in India, becoming the first North African side to qualify for the finals.

== History ==
=== Difficult beginnings ===
The national team made its official debut in March 2016 during a doubleheader against Ghana in the African U-17 Women's World Cup qualification. Led by Fatima Tagnaout and Sanaâ Mssoudy, who would later become prominent figures in the Morocco women's national football team, Morocco faced defeats in both matches. The first leg ended in a 4-0 loss in Rabat, while the second leg resulted in a 6-0 defeat in Accra. The team also failed to qualify for the subsequent edition of the 2018 FIFA U-17 Women's World Cup after being eliminated by South Africa. Morocco experienced a 5-1 loss in the first leg in Salé, followed by a 1-0 defeat in Pretoria. In their pursuit of qualification for the 2020 World Cup, the national team participated in the African qualifiers. After securing a convincing 7-0 victory in the first leg against Djibouti in Djibouti and another 7-0 win in the second leg in Salé, Morocco advanced. They also triumphed with a 1-0 first-leg win against Botswana in Gaborone, but the return leg was canceled due to the COVID-19 pandemic. Unfortunately, the competition was ultimately canceled, and the qualifiers could not be completed as planned. Consequently, the qualifying tournament was postponed until 2022.

=== First qualification for a World Cup ===
On June 4, 2022, the Moroccan national team, led by Patrick Cordoba, achieved a historic milestone by qualifying for the first time in their history for the 2022 FIFA U-17 Women's World Cup. The tournament took place in India from October 11 to 30, 2022. During the qualifying phase, Morocco displayed their strength by eliminating Benin, Niger, and Ghana to secure their spot in the final tournament. In preparation for the World Cup, Morocco engaged in a friendly double-confrontation against Portugal in September 2022. However, the Moroccans faced a heavy defeat in the first match held in Santarém on September 20, 2022, with a score of 8-0. In the second match, played in Rio Maior on September 22, 2022, Portugal claimed a 2-0 victory. Doha El Madani was the sole Moroccan player to find the net during these matches. Prior to the World Cup, Morocco faced Chile in their final match in Goa, resulting in a 3-1 loss, with Iman El Hannachi scoring the only goal for Morocco.

=== World Cup 2022 in India ===
Under the guidance of French coach Anthony Rimasson, Morocco made its debut in the World Cup during the 2022 FIFA U-17 Women's World Cup. Their first match took place on October 11, 2022, against Brazil, a team with a strong tournament history. Unfortunately, the match concluded with a 1-0 victory for Brazil. However, the Moroccan team bounced back in their second group stage match on October 14, 2022, securing a remarkable 3-0 win against India. Notably, Doha El Madani made history by becoming the first Moroccan player to score a goal in the U-17 World Cup, converting a penalty. Yasmine Zouhir and Djennah Chérif also contributed goals to the match, marking this victory as a significant milestone for Morocco in the history of the competition. In their final group stage match on October 17, 2022, in Goa, Morocco faced the United States. Despite their best efforts, the "Lioncelles de l'Atlas" were outplayed and suffered a 4-0 defeat.

=== World Cup 2025 on home soil ===
On March 14, 2024, Morocco was selected to host the FIFA U-17 Women's World Cups from 2025 to 2029, making it the first time the tournament will be held in Africa. This will give the team a unique opportunity to compete on home soil across five consecutive editions.

== Fixtures and results ==
Legend

Win Draw Lose Fixture

== Current squad ==
The following players were selected for the 2025 FIFA U-17 Women's World Cup.

No.	Pos.	Player	Date of birth (age)	Club
1	GK	Ahlam Boukhorb	1 March 2008 (aged 17)	(Royal Moroccan Football Federation) AS FAR
2	DF	Maryam Rahmoune	5 December 2008 (aged 16)	(French Football Federation) Montpellier HSC
3	DF	Anissa Hamdani	21 January 2009 (aged 16)	(French Football Federation) Dijon FCO
4	DF	Imène Diyen	15 June 2009 (aged 16)	(French Football Federation) Paris Saint-Germain
5	DF	Maissane Ferkous	19 June 2009 (aged 16)	(French Football Federation) Le Mans FC
6	MF	Celia Bouzman	27 March 2009 (aged 16)	(French Football Federation) Toulouse FC
7	FW	Jennah Chafni	31 July 2009 (aged 16)	(French Football Federation) Olympique Marseille
8	FW	Inaya Kahlaoui	31 October 2008 (aged 16)	(French Football Federation) Le Puy Foot 43
9	FW	Dounia El Mesmoudi	10 March 2008 (aged 17)	(German Football Association) Eintracht Frankfurt
10	FW	Kautar Azraf	3 January 2008 (aged 17)	(Royal Spanish Football Federation) FC Barcelona
11	FW	Mayssa Baha	16 January 2011 (aged 14)	(Royal Spanish Football Federation) FC Barcelona
12	GK	Salma Assahl	3 July 2008 (aged 17)	(Royal Moroccan Football Federation) RS Berkane
13	DF	Laila Boushaba	25 November 2009 (aged 15)	(Royal Dutch Football Association) PEC Zwolle
14	DF	Hiba Youssoufi	20 June 2009 (aged 16)	(Royal Moroccan Football Federation) AS FAR
15	MF	Nihad Lghachi	24 May 2008 (aged 17)	(Royal Moroccan Football Federation) SC Casablanca
16	GK	Hanna El Mokadem	13 February 2008 (aged 17)	(French Football Federation) Annecy FC
17	MF	Romaissa Ihssan	17 September 2008 (aged 17)	(French Football Federation) Montpellier HSC
18	MF	Isra Redouani	9 January 2008 (aged 17)	(Royal Dutch Football Association) Excelsior
19	FW	Sara El Hajouti	31 March 2009 (aged 16)	(Royal Dutch Football Association) FC Utrecht
20	FW	Sonia Abajiou	6 October 2009 (aged 16)	(German Football Association) Eintracht Frankfurt
21	FW	Amana Lakradi	4 March 2009 (aged 16)	(Royal Dutch Football Association) AZ Alkmaar

== Competitive record ==
=== FIFA U-17 Women's World Cup ===
Year	Result	Pld	W	D	L	GF	GA
(New Zealand) 2008	Did not enter						
(Trinidad and Tobago) 2010	Did not enter						
(Azerbaijan) 2012	Did not enter						
(Costa Rica) 2014	Did not enter						
(Jordan) 2016	Did not qualify						
(Uruguay) 2018	Did not qualify						
(India) 2022	Group stage	3	1	0	2	3	5
(Dominican Republic) 2024	Did not qualify						
(Morocco) 2025	Round of 16	4	1	0	3	5	13
(Morocco) 2026	Round of 16	4	1	0	3	7	15
(Morocco) 2027	Qualified as host						
(Morocco) 2028	Qualified as host						
(Morocco) 2029	Qualified as host						
Total	6/13	11	3	0	8	15	33

=== African U-17 Women's World Cup qualification ===
Year	Round	Position	Pld	W	D	L	GF	GA
2008	Did not enter							
2010	Did not enter							
2012	Did not enter							
2013	First round		-	-	-	-	-	-
2016	Second round	2nd	2	0	0	2	0	10
2018	Second round	2nd	2	0	0	2	1	6
2022	Qualified for World Cup	1st	6	4	1	1	23	3
2024	Fourth round	2nd	6	4	1	1	31	3
2025	Did not enter							
2026	Did not enter							
2027	Did not enter							
2028	Did not enter							
2029	Did not enter							
Total	5/13	1 title	16	8	2	6	55	22

=== Arab U-17 Women's Cup ===
Arab U-17 Women's Cup
Appearances: 0
Year	Round	Position	Pld	W	D	L	GF	GA
(Qatar) 2015	did not enter							
Total	0/1							

== Head-to-head record ==
The following table shows Morocco's head-to-head record in the FIFA U-17 Women's World Cup.

Opponent	Pld	W	D	L	GF	GA	GD	Win %
Argentina	1	0	0	1	1	5	−4	0.00
Brazil	2	0	0	2	0	4	−4	0.00
Costa Rica	1	1	0	0	3	1	+2	100.00
Germany	1	0	0	1	2	4	−2	0.00
India	1	1	0	0	3	0	+3	100.00
Italy	1	0	0	1	1	3	−2	0.00
New Zealand	1	1	0	0	4	0	+4	100.00
North Korea	2	0	0	2	1	12	−11	0.00
United States	1	0	0	1	0	4	−4	0.00
Total	11	3	0	8	15	33	−18	27.27

== Honours ==
- UNAF U-17 Women's Tournament

(gold) Winner (1): 2026
(bronze) Third Place (1): 2024

- Mediterranean Games Women's Tournament

(bronze) Bronze (1): 2026

== See also ==
- Morocco women's national football team
- Morocco women's national under-20 football team
