= African U-17 Women's World Cup qualification =

Qualification for the FIFA U-17 Women's World Cup for African nations

- Organiser(s): CAF
- Founded: 2008
- Region: Africa
- 2026 edition

The African U-17 Women's World Cup qualification is a biennial youth women's association football qualification competition for the FIFA U-17 Women's World Cup organized by the Confederation of African Football for its nations.

== History ==
With the imminent inauguration of the FIFA U-17 Women's World Cup in 2008, CAF began organizing a qualification competition that year with 12 teams entering its debut edition, but 5 withdrew before playing. On 19 January 2010, CAF released the fixtures for the second edition of this competition. Ten teams entered that edition, but only five played matches; Nigeria, Ghana and South Africa qualified for that year's FIFA U-17 Women's World Cup. On 7 June 2023, CAF revealed the formats for the qualification procedures for the next editions of the FIFA U-17 and U-20 Women's World Cups, the former whose draw was conducted the following day.

== Results ==
=== African U-17 Women's Championship ===
Year	Hosts	Champion	Score	Runner-up	Third place
2008 (Note: A round-robin mini-tournament determined the final standings though no winner was crowned.)	Home sites	Nigeria	round-robin	Ghana	Cameroon

=== African U-17 Women's World Cup qualification ===
Year	Hosts	Final round		
Year	Hosts	Winners	Agg. Score	Runners-up
2010	Home sites	Ghana	11–0	Tunisia
2010	Home sites	Nigeria	7–1	South Africa
2010	Home sites	South Africa (Note: Qualification after a play-off round.)	2–1	Tunisia
2012	Home sites	Gambia	3–1	Tunisia
2012	Home sites	Nigeria	7–1	Zambia
2012	Home sites	Ghana	5–1	South Africa
2013	Home sites	Ghana	5–2	Equatorial Guinea
2013	Home sites	Nigeria	w/o	South Sudan
2013	Home sites	Zambia	6–4	South Africa
2016	Home sites	Ghana	10–0	Morocco
2016	Home sites	Cameroon	6–1	Egypt
2016	Home sites	Nigeria	7–0	South Africa
2018	Home sites	Ghana	19–0	Djibouti
2018	Home sites	South Africa	6–1	Morocco
2018	Home sites	Cameroon	3–3 (a)	Nigeria
2020	Not completed: The 2020 FIFA U-17 Women's World Cup was cancelled due to the COVID-19 pandemic.			
2022	Home sites	Morocco	2–2 (4–2 p)	Ghana
2022	Home sites	Nigeria	1–0	Ethiopia
2022	Home sites	Tanzania	5–1	Cameroon
2024	Home sites	Kenya	5–0	Burundi
2024	Home sites	Zambia	3–1	Morocco
2024	Home sites	Nigeria	6–1	Liberia
2025	Home sites	Nigeria	4–0	Algeria
2025	Home sites	Ivory Coast	2–2 (a)	Guinea
2025	Home sites	Cameroon	4–1	Kenya
2025	Home sites	Zambia	6–2	Benin

== Results at the FIFA U-17 Women's World Cup ==
Since its inception in 2008, all editions have qualified three teams to the FIFA U-17 Women's World Cup. Nigeria won the 2026 edition in Morocco. Ghana finished 3rd in the 2012 edition in Azerbaijan. Tanzania has reached the quarter-final also the same year, with all other qualified CAF nations getting eliminated in the group stages.

- 1st — Champions
- 2nd — Runners-up
- 3rd — Third place
- 4th — Fourth place
- QF — Quarter-final
- R16 — Round of 16 (since 2025)
- GS — Group stage
- Q — Qualified
- = Hosts

World Cup	(New Zealand) 2008	(Trinidad and Tobago) 2010	(Azerbaijan) 2012	(Costa Rica) 2014	(Jordan) 2016	(Uruguay) 2018	(India) 2022	(Dominican Republic) 2024	(Morocco) 2025	(Morocco) 2026	(Morocco) 2027	Total
Cameroon					GS	GS			GS			3
Gambia			GS									1
Ghana	GS	GS	3rd	QF	QF	QF				QF		7
Ivory Coast									GS			1
Kenya								GS		R16		2
Morocco							GS		R16	R16	Q	4
Nigeria	GS	QF	QF	QF	GS		3rd	QF	R16	1st		8
South Africa		GS				GS						2
Tanzania							QF					1
Zambia				GS				GS	R16	GS		4
Total	2	3	3	3	3	3	3	3	5	5	TBD	

== Team participation ==
Team	2008	2010	2012	2013	2016	2018	2022	2024	2025	2026	Total
Algeria	×	×	×	×	×	R1	×	R3	R3	R1	4
Benin	•	×	×	×	×	×	R2	R2	R3	R3	4
Botswana	•	R1	R1	R1	PR	R1	R2	R2	R2	R1	9
Burkina Faso	×	×	×	×	×	×	×	R3	×	R1	2
Burundi	×	×	×	×	×	×	R3	R4	R2	R2	4
Cameroon	3rd	×	R1	×	Q	Q	R4	R2	Q	R2	8
Central African Republic	×	×	×	×	×	×	×	R2	R1	×	2
Congo	×	×	×	•	×	×	×	×	•	×	0
DR Congo	R1	•	×	×	•	×	R2	•	R2	R2	4
Djibouti	×	×	×	×	R1	R2	•	R3	×	×	3
Egypt	×	•	×	×	R2	×	R3	×	R1	×	3
Equatorial Guinea	×	×	×	R2	×	•	•	•	•	×	1
Eritrea	×	×	×	×	×	×	•	×	×	×	0
Eswatini	×	×	×	×	×	×	×	×	•	×	0
Ethiopia	×	×	×	×	R1	R1	R4	R3	R2	R3	6
Gabon	×	×	×	×	•	×	×	×	R1	×	1
Gambia	×	×	Q	×	×	R1	×	×	×	×	2
Ghana	2nd	Q	Q	Q	Q	Q	R4			Q	8
Guinea	PR	×	•	×	×	×	R3	R2	R3	R2	5
Guinea-Bissau	×	×	×	×	×	×	•	×	×	×	0
Ivory Coast	×	×	×	×	×	×	×	×	Q	R1	2
Kenya	×	•	R1	•	×	•	•	Q	R3	Q	4
Liberia	•	×	×	×	×	×	R2	R4	×	R2	3
Libya	×	×	×	×	×	•	×	•	×	×	0
Malawi	×	×	×	×	×	×	×	×	×	R1	1
Mali	×	×	×	×	•	•	×	•	×	×	0
Mauritania	×	×	×	×	×	×	•	×	×	×	0
Mauritius	×	×	×	×	×	×	×	•	×	×	0
Morocco	×	×	×	•	R2	R2	Q	R4	Hosts		4
Mozambique	×	×	•	×	×	×	×	×	×	×	0
Namibia	•	×	R1	×	R1	×	•	×	R1	R1	4
Niger	×	×	×	×	×	×	R3	R2	R1	R1	4
Nigeria	1st	Q	Q	Q	Q	R2	Q	Q	Q	Q	10
Rwanda	×	×	×	×	×	×	•	×	×	R1	1
São Tomé and Príncipe	×	×	×	×	×	×	•	×	×	×	0
Senegal	×	×	×	×	×	×	R2	R3	R1	R3	4
Sierra Leone	×	•	R1	×	•	••	•	×	R2	R2	4
South Africa	R1	Q	R2	R2	R2	Q	R3	R2	R2	R3	10
South Sudan	×	×	×	•	×	×	•	×	×	R1	1
Tanzania	×	×	×	×	×	×	Q	R2	R2	R2	4
Togo	×	•	×	×	×	×	×	×	•	R1	1
Tunisia	×	R2	R2	×	×	•	×	×	R1	R1	4
Uganda	×	×	×	×	×	×	R2	R3	R2	R2	4
Zambia	PR	×	R2	Q	•	PR	R3	Q	Q	Q	8
Zimbabwe	•	×	×	×	×	×	×	×	•	R1	1
Total	7	5	11	6	10	11	18	20	23	31	

Legend

- 1st — Champions
- 2nd — Runners-up
- 3rd — Third place
- Q — Qualified
- PR — Preliminary Round
- R1 — Round 1
- R2 — Round 2
- R3 — Round 3
- R4 — Round 4
- • — Withdrew
- •• — Withdrew after playing one or more matches.
- × — Did not enter
- — Hosts
- p — Participating in the upcoming tournament edition

== See also ==
- Women's Africa Cup of Nations
- CAF Women's Champions League
- African U-20 Women's World Cup qualification
