= Suzzy Teye =

Ghanaian footballer (born 2002)

Personal information
- Full name: Suzzy Dede Teye
- Date of birth: 6 November 2002 (age 23)
- Place of birth: Ghana
- Height: 1.56 m (5 ft 1 1/2 in)
- Position: Midfielder

Team information
- Current team: Yüksekova
- Number: 19

Senior career*
Years	Team	Apps	(Gls)
2020–2021	Lady Strikers		
2022–2023	Hatayspor	13	(6)
2023–2024	Kazygurt		
2025	Hakkarigücü	5	(1)
2025–	Yüksekova	3	(1)

International career
2018	Ghana U-17	4	(1)
2022	Ghana U-20	3	(0)
2022–	Ghana		
- * Club domestic league appearances and goals as of 5 February 2023

Suzzy Dede Teye (born 6 November 2002) is a Ghanaian footballer, who plays as a midfielder for Yüksekova in the Turkish Super League and the Ghana women's national team.

== Club career ==
Teye played for the Ghana Women's Premier League club Lady Strikers F.C. In 2021, she was named "Player of the Month February".

In October 2022, she moved to Turkey, and signed with Hatayspor to play in the 2022–23 Sper League. After the end of the league season, she left Turkey for Kazakhstan in March 2023.

In the 2023–24 season, she played in Kazakhstan for Kazygurt.

At the beginning of 2025, she returned to Turkey, and joined Hakkarigücü to play in the second half of the 2024–25 Super League season.

In September 2025, she transferred to Yüksekova in Hakkari Province, which was recently promoted to the Turkish Super League.

== International career ==
Teye was admitted to the Ghana girls' U-17 team to plat at the 2018 African U-17 Women's World Cup Qualifying Tournament and the 2018 FIFA U-17 Women's World Cup .

She was a member of the Ghana women's U-20 team at the 2022 FIFA U-20 Women's World Cup.

She is part of the Ghana women's national team.

== Honours ==
=== Individual ===
- Player of the Month: ,(2021 February) Lady Strikers F.C.
