= Justine Ayerango =

Female professional footballer

- Justine Ayerango is a Rines SS Women football club player, voted as the best upcoming young player of the year in FUFA Symposium of 2026 hosted at Skyz Hotel in Kampala

Personal information
- Place of birth: Entebbe Municipality, Uganda
- Position: Forward

Team information
- Current team: Rines SS WFC

Youth career
- Years: Team
- Rines Secondary School

Justine Ayerango is a Ugandan female professional footballer who plays for Rines Secondary School and Rines SS WFC. She captained Uganda to win the CECAFA U-17 Women's Championship title in June 2026.

== Early life ==
Ayerango was born in Entebbe and started playing football in 2018 at Bethel Junior School. Her academic and football journey has been heavily supported by talent rewards. She has been studying on a football bursary since Primary Six.

As of mid-2025, she was completing her secondary education at Rines Secondary School Namusera (Senior Five going into Senior Six) while simultaneously playing for the school's affiliated premier club in the FUFA Women Super League.

She has on several occasions represented her school in the USSSA football tournament and captained the side that won the 2026 edition at Kabaka Kyabaggu stadium.

== Club career ==
She plays her club football at Rines SS WFC in the FUFA Women Super League

== International career ==
She captained the Teen Cranes (U17 Uganda Women's National Team) and finished among the top scorers( with 6 goals) at the CECAFA Women's U-17 Championship 2026 edition.

== Awards and recognition ==
She has won awards for the best upcoming Women footballers at the Local Football Awards(LFA) 2025 and Women in Football symposium 2026.

She was named the Most valuable player of the USSSA girls' championship 2026
