= Jacqueline Owusu =

Ghanaian footballer (born 2002)

Jaqueline Owusu
Personal information
- Full name: Jaqueline Owusu
- Date of birth: 12 June 2002 (age 24)
- Place of birth: Kumasi, Ghana
- Height: 1.63 m (5 ft 4 in)
- Position: Midfielder

Team information
- Current team: Hapoel Tel Aviv Women

Jacqueline Owusu (born 12 June 2002) is a Ghanaian professional footballer who has played as a midfielder for Liga F side Real Sociedad and the Ghana women's national football team. She previously played for Dreamz Ladies and Israeli side Maccabi Emek Hefer. Nowadays she belongs to Hapoel Tel Aviv Women team Israel.

== Career ==
Owusu was born in Kumasi in the Ashanti Region of Ghana. Owusu started her career with Kumasi-side Dreamz Ladies. In 2021, she secured a move to Israeli Ligat Nashim side Maccabi Emek Hefer where she played for two years.

In July 2023, Owusu signed a two-year contract with Liga F side Real Sociedad that will last until the end of the 2024–25 season.

At the international level, Owusu has played for Ghana U-17 side, the Black Maidens, the Ghana U-20, and the Black Princess. She was part of the Black Princesses squad at the 2022 FIFA U-20 Women's World Cup held in Costa Rica.

Since 2023, she has been a member of the senior national team, the Black Queens. She was part of the squad that played in the 2024 Women's Africa Cup of Nations qualifiers and qualified Ghana for the 2024 Women's Africa Cup of Nations to be held in Morocco.
