= Mildred Cheche =

Kenyan footballer

Mildred Cheche is a Kenyan former footballer, and the current head coach for the U17 women's national team, the Junior Starlets, and assistant coach for the senior women's national team, the Harambee Starlets.

== Career ==
In June 2024, Cheche became the first coach to qualify any Kenyan football setup to a World Cup after Kenya U17 women's team booked a slot in the FIFA U-17 Women's World Cup. That fete earned here an award in July 2024.
