= Michelle Abueng =

Motswana footballer (born 2001)

Personal information
- Date of birth: 6 May 2001 (age 25)
- Position: Forward

Team information
- Current team: Yasa

Senior career*
Years	Team	Apps	(Gls)
2019–	Yasa		

International career
2015–2017	Botswana U17		
2017–2020	Botswana U20		
2019–	Botswana		
- * Club domestic league appearances and goals

Michelle Abueng (born 6 May 2001) is a Motswana footballer who plays as a forward for Zambian club Yasa FC and the Botswana women's national team.

She caught the attention of Zambian club Yasa Queens while playing against Zambia in the 2018 African U-17 Women's World Cup Qualifying Tournament, but they were not able to sign her until 2019 since she was still a minor at the time.

She scored five goals in a game against Namibia at the 2020 African U-20 Women's World Cup Qualifying Tournament.

She made her senior international debut at the 2019 COSAFA Women's Championship on 1 August 2019, scoring the only goal in a win over Namibia.

== Early life and education ==
Michelle Abueng was born on 6 May 2001 in Botswana. She grew up in the Selibe Phikwe area, specifically in a neighborhood fondly referred to as Distance, where she was raised by her grandmother. Immersed in a football-loving environment especially among the boys in her community, She defied traditional gender expectations and joined in the game from an early age. At 16, while preparing for the African U-17 Women's World Cup qualifiers against South Africa in 2017, she suffered a serious training injury. Although her coaches initially feared it could end her budding career, she made a remarkable recovery and, within six months, received her first call-up to the Botswana U-17 national team. She attended Jarmy Christian Academy in Zambia, where she was in Grade 12 during her early years as a professional footballer demonstrating her strong dedication to balancing academics with sports.
