= Cynthia Aku =

Nigerian professional footballer

Personal information
- Full name: Cynthia Onyedikachi Aku
- Date of birth: 31 December 1999 (age 26)
- Place of birth: Nigeria
- Height: 1.64 m (5 ft 5 in)
- Position: Forward

Team information
- Current team: Ataşehir Belediyespor

Senior career*
Years	Team	Apps	(Gls)
- Rivers Angels
2022	Kireçburnu Spor	13	(0)
2022–	Ataşehir Belediyespor	10	(12)

International career
- Nigeria
- * Club domestic league appearances and goals as of 8 January 2023

Cynthia Onyedikachi Aku (born 31 December 1999) is a Nigerian professional footballer, who plays as a forward for Ataşehir Belediyespor in the Turkish Women's Football Super League. She represented Nigeria at youth level, before making her debut for the senior team.

== Club career ==
Aku played in her country for Rivers Angels in the Nigeria Women Premier League.

In the beginning of 2022, she moved to Turkey, and joined the Istanbul-based club Kireçburnu Spor to play in the 2021-22 Turkish Women's Football Super League. On 14 October 2022, she transferred to Ataşehir Belediyespor for the 2022-23 Women's Super League season.

== International career ==
At the 2019 WAFU Zone B Women's Cup, Aku was named player of the match in Nigeria's 15–0 victory against Niger.
