= Zanzibar women's national under-17 football team =

The Zanzibar women's national under-17 football team is a national association football youth team of Zanzibar and is controlled by the Zanzibar Football Federation (ZFF), a member of the Confederation of African Football (CAF). They competed at the 2026 CECAFA Women's U-17 Championship.

== See also ==
- Football in Zanzibar
- Zanzibar women's national football team
