= Uganda women's national under-17 football team =

Uganda women's U-17
- Nickname: The Crested Cranes
- Association: Federation of Uganda Football Associations (FUFA)
- Confederation: CAF (Africa)
- Sub-confederation: CECAFA (East & Central Africa)
- FIFA code: UGA
First colours	Second colours

African U-17 Women's World Cup qualification
- Appearances: 2 (first in 2022)
- Best result: Round 1 (2022)

FIFA U-17 Women's World Cup
- Appearances: None

Uganda women's national under-17 football team is a youth association football team operated under the auspices of the Federation of Uganda Football Associations. Its primary role is the development of players in preparation for the senior Uganda women's national football team.

== Competitive record ==
=== FIFA U-17 Women's World Cup record ===
FIFA U-17 Women's World Cup
Year	Result	Pld	W	D *	L	GF	GA
(New Zealand) 2008	Did not enter						
(Trinidad and Tobago) 2010	Did not enter						
(Azerbaijan) 2012	Did not enter						
(Costa Rica) 2014	Did not enter						
(Jordan) 2016	Did not enter						
(Uruguay) 2018	Did not enter						
(India) 2022	Did not qualify						
(Dominican Republic) 2024	Did not qualify						
(Morocco) 2025	To be determined						
Total	0/9						

=== African U-17 Cup of Nations for Women record ===
African U-17 Cup of Nations for Women
Year	Round	Position	Pld	W	D	L	GF	GA
2008	Did not enter							
2010	Did not enter							
2012	Did not enter							
2013	Did not enter							
2016	Did not enter							
2018	Did not enter							
2022	Round 2	12th	2	0	2	0	3	3
2024	To be determined							
Total	2/8	0 titles	2	0	2	0	3	3

== See also ==
- Uganda women's national football team
- Uganda women's national under-20 football team
