= Somalia women's national under-17 football team =

Somalia
- Nickname: Ocean Starlets
- Association: Somali Football Federation
- Confederation: CAF (Africa)
- Sub-confederation: CECAFA (East Africa)
- Head coach: Mahad Hagi; Dadir Amin Ali
- FIFA code: SOM
First colours	Second colours

First international
- Djibouti 5–1 Somalia (Djibouti City, Djibouti; 25 October 2025)

Biggest win
- Somalia 8–2 Sudan (Dar es Salaam, Tanzania; 17 June 2026)

Biggest defeat
- Somalia 0–6 Kenya (Dar es Salaam, Tanzania; 15 June 2026)

CECAFA Women's U-17 Championship
- Appearances: 1 (first in 2026)
- Best result: Group stage (2026)

The Somalia women's national under-17 football team is a national association football youth team of Somalia and is controlled by the Somali Football Federation (SFF), a member of the Confederation of African Football (CAF). They earned their first international football victory at the 2026 CECAFA Women's U-17 Championship.

== Current squad ==
The following 19 players were called up for the 2026 CECAFA Women's U-17 Championship.

No.	Pos.	Player	Date of birth (age)	Club
1	GK	Hani Abdi		
2		Rimas Salah		
3		Najma Abdullahi		
4		Amran Ahmed		
5		Salma Abdi		
6		Zamzam Mohamud		
7		Maryan Osoble		
8		Amira Abdi		
9		Hibo Salad		
10		Halimo Isse (Captain)		
11		Sundus Mohamaed		
12		Sadiyo Muse		
13	GK	Najma Ali		
14		Maryan Nur		
15		Shaciye Nasri		
16		Ruwayda Farah		
17		Nagma Mohamed		
18		Fathi Ahmed		
20		Amino Osman		

== See also ==
- Women's football in Somalia
- Somalia national under-17 football team
