= 2010 African U-17 Women's World Cup qualification =

2010 African U-17 Women's World Cup Qualifying Tournament
Tournament details
- Teams: 10 (from 1 confederation)

Tournament statistics
- Matches played: 8
- Goals scored: 45 (5.63 per match)

The 2010 African U-17 Women's World Cup Qualifying Tournament was the second edition of the African U-17 Cup of Nations for Women and the first edition of this under-17 qualification tournament new format. The biennial international under-17 football competition organised by the Confederation of African Football (CAF) to determine which women's under-17 national teams from Africa qualify for the FIFA U-17 Women's World Cup.

10 teams entered the competition, but due to many withdrawals, only 5 played matches. The final three teams qualified to the World Cup. The top three teams of the tournament Ghana, Nigeria and South Africa qualified for the 2010 FIFA U-17 Women's World Cup in Trinidad and Tobago as the CAF representatives.

== Preliminary round ==
Team 1	Agg.	Team 2	1st leg	2nd leg
Botswana	w/o	(Kenya) Kenya^{1}	N/A	N/A
Togo	w/o	(Sierra Leone) Sierra Leone^{1}	N/A	N/A

- 1 – Both Kenya and Sierra Leone withdrew from competition before the start of the 1st leg. As a result, Botswana and Togo qualified for the next round.

== First round ==
Team 1	Agg.	Team 2	1st leg	2nd leg
Botswana	1–22	South Africa	1–9	0–13
Togo^{2} (Togo)	w/o	Nigeria	N/A	N/A
RD Congo^{2} (Democratic Republic of the Congo)	w/o	Tunisia	N/A	N/A
Ghana	w/o	(Egypt) Egypt^{2}	N/A	N/A

- 2 – Togo, RD Congo, and Egypt withdrew from competition before the start of the 1st leg. As a result, Nigeria, Tunisia, and Ghana qualified for the next round.

== Second round ==
Team 1	Agg.	Team 2	1st leg	2nd leg
Nigeria	7–1	South Africa	5–0	2–1
Ghana	11–0	Tunisia	7–0	4–0

Nigeria and Ghana qualify for the 2010 FIFA U-17 Women's World Cup held in Trinidad and Tobago. South Africa and Tunisia will play in a playoff round to determine the last qualifier.

== Play-off round ==
Team 1	Agg.	Team 2	1st leg	2nd leg
Tunisia	1–2	South Africa	0–1	1–1

The winner of the play-off round will qualify for the 2010 FIFA U-17 Women's World Cup held in Trinidad and Tobago.

== Qualified teams for FIFA U-17 Women's World Cup ==
The following three teams from CAF qualified for the FIFA U-17 Women's World Cup.

Team	Qualified on	Previous appearances in tournament
Ghana	2010	1 (2008)
Nigeria	2010	1 (2008)
South Africa	2010	0
