= Burundi women's national under-17 football team =

Burundi women's U-17
- Nickname(s): Swallows (Hirondelles)
- Association: Football Federation of Burundi
- Sub-confederation: CECAFA (East & Central Africa)
- FIFA code: BDI
First colours	Second colours

African U-17 Women's World Cup qualification
- Appearances: 2 (first in 2022)
- Best result: Round 4 (2024)

FIFA U-17 Women's World Cup
- Appearances: None

Burundi women's national under-17 football team is a youth association football team operated under the auspices of the Football Federation of Burundi. Its primary role is the development of players in preparation for the senior Burundi women's national football team.

== Competitive record ==
=== FIFA U-17 Women's World Cup record ===
FIFA U-17 Women's World Cup
Year	Result	Pld	W	D *	L	GF	GA
(New Zealand) 2008	Did not enter						
(Trinidad and Tobago) 2010	Did not enter						
(Azerbaijan) 2012	Did not enter						
(Costa Rica) 2014	Did not enter						
(Jordan) 2016	Did not enter						
(Uruguay) 2018	Did not enter						
(India) 2022	Did not qualify						
(Dominican Republic) 2024	Did not qualify						
(Morocco) 2025	Did not qualify						
Total	0/9						

=== African U-17 Cup of Nations for Women record ===
African U-17 Cup of Nations for Women
Year	Round	Position	Pld	W	D	L	GF	GA
2008	Did not enter							
2010	Did not enter							
2012	Did not enter							
2013	Did not enter							
2016	Did not enter							
2018	Did not enter							
2022	Round 2	12th	2	1	0	1	2	5
2024	Round 4	2nd	6	4	0	2	30	6
Total	2/8	0 titles	8	5	0	3	32	11

== See also ==
- Burundi women's national football team
- Burundi women's national under-20 football team
