= Tanzania women's national under-17 football team =

National association football team

Tanzania under-17
- Nickname: Serengeti girls
- Association: Tanzania Football Federation
- Confederation: CAF (Africa)
- Sub-confederation: CECAFA (East & Central Africa)
- Head coach: Bakari Shime
- Captain: Noela Luhala
- Most caps: Joyce Lema (24 matches)
- Top scorer: Clara Luvanga (36 goals)
- FIFA code: TAN
First colours	Second colours	Third colours

First international
- Tanzania 5–1 Burundi (Dar-es-Salaam, Tanzania; 25 Jan 2020)

Biggest win
- Tanzania 7–0 Botswana (Zanzibar, Tanzania; 6 March 2022)

Biggest defeat
- Japan 4–0 Tanzania (Fatorda, India; 12 October 2022)

African U-17 Women's World Cup qualification
- Appearances: 1 (first in 2022)
- Best result: Fourth round

CECAFA Women's U-17 Championship
- Appearances: 1 (first in 2021)
- Best result: Runners-up (2021)

COSAFA Women's U-17 Championship
- Appearances: 1 (first in 2020)
- Best result: Champions (2020)

FIFA U-17 Women's World Cup
- Appearances: 1 (first in 2022)
- Best result: Quarter-finals (2022)
Medal record
CECAFA Women's U-17 Championship
Silver medal – second place	2021

The Tanzania women's national under-17 football team represents Tanzania in international women's under-17 football. The team is controlled by the governing body for football in Tanzania, the Tanzania Football Federation (TFF). The team and federation is currently a member of the Confederation of African Football (CAF) and the regional Council for East and Central Africa Football Associations (CECAFA).

The team finished as runners-up in the 2021 edition of CECAFA Women's U-17 Championship and also qualified for the 2022 FIFA U-17 Women's World Cup becoming the first Tanzanian team to qualify for a FIFA World Cup event.

== Fixtures and results ==
Legend

Win Draw Lose Fixture

== Competitive records ==
=== FIFA U-17 Women's World Cup ===
FIFA U-17 Women's World Cup record
Appearances: 1
Host/Year	Result	Position	Pld	W	D	L	GF	GA
(New Zealand) 2008	Did not enter							
(Trinidad and Tobago) 2010	Did not enter							
(Azerbaijan) 2012	Did not enter							
(Costa Rica) 2014	Did not enter							
(Jordan) 2016	Did not enter							
(Uruguay) 2018	Did not enter							
(India) 2020	Initially postponed to 2021, later cancelled due to COVID-19 pandemic							
(India) 2022	Quarter-finals	8th	4	1	1	2	3	9
(Dominican Republic) 2024	did not qualify							
(Morocco) 2025	did not qualify							
Total	1/9	0 Titles	4	1	1	2	3	9
