= Mali women's national under-17 football team =

Mali women's U-17
- Nickname: Les Aiglonnes (The Female Eagles)
- Association: Malian Football Federation
- Confederation: CAF (Africa)
- Sub-confederation: WAFU (West Africa)
- FIFA code: MLI
First colours	Second colours

African U-17 Women's World Cup qualification
- Appearances: None

FIFA U-17 Women's World Cup
- Appearances: None

The Mali women's national under-17 football team is a youth association football team operated under the auspices of Malian Football Federation. Its primary role is the development of players in preparation for the senior Mali women's national football team.

== Competitive record ==
=== FIFA U-17 Women's World Cup record ===
FIFA U-17 Women's World Cup
Year	Result	Pld	W	D *	L	GF	GA
(New Zealand) 2008	Did not enter						
(Trinidad and Tobago) 2010	Did not enter						
(Azerbaijan) 2012	Did not enter						
(Costa Rica) 2014	Did not enter						
(Jordan) 2016	Did not enter						
(Uruguay) 2018	Did not enter						
(India) 2022	Did not enter						
(Dominican Republic) 2024	Did not enter						
(Morocco) 2025	Did not enter						
Total	0/9						

== See also ==
- Mali women's national football team
- Mali women's national under-20 football team
