= Ghana women's national under-17 association football team =

National association football team

Ghana Women's U-17
- Association: Ghana Football Association
- Confederation: CAF (Africa)
- Sub-confederation: WAFU (West Africa)
- FIFA code: GHA
First colours	Second colours

World Cup
- Appearances: 7 (first in 2008)
- Best result: 3rd Place (2012)

African U-17 Women's World Cup qualification
- Appearances: 6 (first in 2008)
- Best result: Champion (2010, 2012, 2013, 2016, 2018)

Ghana women's national under-17 association football team represents Ghana in international youth association football competitions.

== FIFA U-17 Women's World Cup ==
Year	Result	Pos	Pld	W	D*	L	GF	GA
(New Zealand) 2008	Group stage	9th	3	1	1	1	4	4
(Trinidad and Tobago) 2010	Group stage	11th	3	1	0	2	1	4
(Azerbaijan) 2012	Third place	3rd	6	4	0	2	10	4
(Costa Rica) 2014	Quarter-finals	6th	4	2	1	1	6	4
(Jordan) 2016	Quarter-finals	7th	4	2	0	2	4	8
(Uruguay) 2018	Quarter-finals	6th	4	3	1	0	12	3
(India) 2022	Did not qualify							
(Dominican Republic) 2024	Banned for Age Fabrication							
(Morocco) 2025	Expelled							
(Morocco) 2026	Quarter-finals	8th	5	1	2	2	6	8
(Morocco) 2027	To be determined							
(Morocco) 2028	To be determined							
(Morocco) 2029	To be determined							
Total:7/13	Third place	3rd	29	14	5	10	43	35

* Draws include knockout matches decided via penalty shoot-out.

== African U-17 Cup of Nations for Women ==
- 2008 - Runners-up
- 2010 - Champion ^{1}
- 2012 - Champion ^{2}
- 2013 - Champion ^{3}
- 2016 - Champion ^{4}
- 2018 - Champion ^{5}

^1 : with Nigeria
^2 : with Gambia & Nigeria
^3 : with Nigeria & Zambia
^4 : with Nigeria & Cameroon
^5 : with Cameroon & South Africa

== Current squad ==
Squad for the 2016 FIFA U-17 Women's World Cup.

No.	Pos.	Player	Date of birth (age)	Club
1	GK	Kayza Massey	2 February 2001 (aged 15)	(Canadian Soccer Association) Ottawa South United
2	DF	Joyce Asamoah	14 September 2000 (aged 16)	(Ghana Football Association) Fabulous Ladies FC
3	MF	Nina Norshie	14 September 2001 (aged 15)	(Ghana Football Association) Valued Girls FC
4	DF	Uwaisa Mawia	20 February 2000 (aged 16)	(Ghana Football Association) Ampem Darko Ladies
5	DF	Linda Amoako	7 February 1999 (aged 17)	(Ghana Football Association) Soccer Intellectual Ladies
6	MF	Grace Asantewaa	5 December 2000 (aged 15)	(Ghana Football Association) Ampem Darko Ladies
7	FW	Rafia Kulchirie	20 December 2001 (aged 14)	(Ghana Football Association) Hasaacas Ladies FC
8	MF	Grace Acheampong	6 September 2000 (aged 16)	(Ghana Football Association) Bafana Ladies
9	MF	Gifty Acheampong	5 November 1999 (aged 16)	(Ghana Football Association) Immigration FC
10	FW	Sandra Owusu-Ansah	29 January 2000 (aged 16)	(Ghana Football Association) Supreme Ladies
11	MF	Mary Entoah	27 April 2000 (aged 16)	(Ghana Football Association) Police Ladies
12	DF	Cecilia Hagan	7 February 2000 (aged 16)	(Ghana Football Association) Bafana Ladies
13	MF	Olivia Anokye	1 April 2000 (aged 16)	(Ghana Football Association) Bafana Ladies
14	DF	Philicity Asuako	25 December 1999 (aged 16)	(Ghana Football Association) Samaria Ladies
15	FW	Adizatu Mustapha	4 July 1999 (aged 17)	(Ghana Football Association) Soccer Intellectual Ladies
16	GK	Martha Annan	2 November 1999 (aged 16)	(Ghana Football Association) Bafana Ladies
17	MF	Fuseina Mumuni	2 April 2001 (aged 15)	(Ghana Football Association) Lepo Stars Ladies FC
18	DF	Blessing Agbomadzi	11 June 2001 (aged 15)	(Ghana Football Association) Sport Academy
19	FW	Sylvian Amankwah	20 October 1999 (aged 16)	(Ghana Football Association) Prison Ladies
20	FW	Vivian Adjei	14 January 2000 (aged 16)	(Ghana Football Association) Sport Academy
21	GK	Selina Amusilie	23 May 2001 (aged 15)	(Ghana Football Association) Soccer Intellectual Ladies

=== Previous squads ===
2008 FIFA U-17 Women's World Cup
2010 FIFA U-17 Women's World Cup
2012 FIFA U-17 Women's World Cup
2014 FIFA U-17 Women's World Cup
2016 FIFA U-17 Women's World Cup

== Head-to-head record ==
The following table shows Ghana's head-to-head record in the FIFA U-17 Women's World Cup.

Opponent	Pld	W	D	L	GF	GA	GD	Win %
Argentina	1	0	1	0	1	1	+0	0.00
Brazil	2	1	1	0	4	3	+1	50.00
Canada	3	1	0	2	3	3	+0	33.33
China	1	1	0	0	2	0	+2	100.00
Costa Rica	1	1	0	0	1	0	+1	100.00
Finland	1	1	0	0	3	1	+2	100.00
France	1	0	0	1	0	2	−2	0.00
Germany	4	2	0	2	5	5	+0	50.00
Italy	1	0	1	0	2	2	+0	0.00
Japan	3	1	0	2	1	6	−5	33.33
Mexico	1	0	1	0	2	2	+0	0.00
New Zealand	1	1	0	0	2	0	+2	100.00
North Korea	3	1	1	1	4	3	+1	33.33
Norway	1	0	0	1	0	3	−3	0.00
Paraguay	1	1	0	0	1	0	+1	100.00
Republic of Ireland	1	0	0	1	0	3	−3	0.00
United States	1	1	0	0	2	1	+1	100.00
Uruguay	2	2	0	0	10	0	+10	100.00
Total	29	14	5	10	43	35	+8	48.28

== See also ==
- Ghana women's national football team
- Ghana women's national under-20 football team
