= Kenya women's national under-17 football team =

National association football team

Kenya Under-17
- Nickname: Harambee Starlets
- Association: Football Kenya Federation
- Confederation: CAF (Africa)
- Sub-confederation: CECAFA (East and Central Africa)
- Head coach: Mildred Cheche
- FIFA code: KEN
First colours	Second colours	Third colours

African U-17 Women's World Cup qualification
- Appearances: 3 (first in 2012)
- Best result: Qualified for World Cup (2024, 2026)

FIFA U-17 Women's World Cup
- Appearances: 2 (first in 2024)
- Best result: Round of 16 (2026)

The Kenya women's national under-17 football team represents Kenya at an under-17 level in women's football and is controlled by the Football Kenya Federation.

In 2024 they became the first Kenyan team to qualify for a FIFA World Cup.

== The team ==
In 2006, the U-17 national team had 2 training sessions a week. They competed in the African Women U-17 Qualifying Tournament 2010. Botswana beat them in the opening round in a walkover win after Kenya withdrew from the tournament. The women's U-17 team competed in the CAF qualifiers for the FIFA U-17 World Cup that will be held in Azerbaijan in September 2012. They did not advance out of their region. They played a qualification match in Abeokuta against Nigeria.

== Background and development ==
Early development of the women's game at the time colonial powers brought football to the continent was limited as colonial powers in the region tended to take make concepts of patriarchy and women's participation in sport with them to local cultures that had similar concepts already embedded in them. The lack of later development of the national team on a wider international level symptomatic of all African teams is a result of several factors, including limited access to education, poverty amongst women in the wider society, and fundamental inequality present in the society that occasionally allows for female specific human rights abuses. When quality female football players are developed, they tend to leave for greater opportunities abroad. Continent wide, funding is also an issue, with most development money coming from FIFA, not the national football association. Future, success for women's football in Africa is dependent on improved facilities and access by women to these facilities. Attempting to commercialise the game and make it commercially viable is not the solution, as demonstrated by the current existence of many youth and women's football camps held throughout the continent.

Women's football gained popularity in the country during the 1990s. In 1993, this popularity led to the creation of the Kenya Women's Football Federation, who organised a national team that represented the country several times in international tournaments between its founding and 1996. In 1996, the Kenya Women's Football Federation folded under pressure from FIFA and women's football was subsumed by the Kenya Football Federation, with women being represented in the organisation as a subcommittee. Football is the fourth most popular sport for women in the country, trailing behind volley, basketball and field hockey. In 1999, a woman referee from Kenya officiated a match between the Nigerian and South African women's teams in Johannesburg and was treated poorly by fans when she failed to call an offsides. The game was delayed because of the ensuring violence, which included bricks being tossed at her. In 2006, there were 7,776 registered female football players of which 5,418 were registered, under-18 youth players and 2,358 were registered adult players. This followed a pattern of increased registration of female football players in the country with 4,915 total registered players in 2000, 5,000 in 2001, 5,500 in 2002, 6,000 in 2003, 6,700 in 2004 and 7,100 in 2005. In 2006, there were 710 total football teams in the country, with 690 being mixed gendered teams and 20 being women only. In 2006, there were over 3,000 girls playing in seven different leagues around the country. Rights to broadcast the 2011 Women's World Cup in the country were bought by the African Union of Broadcasting.

Kenya Football Federation was created and joined FIFA in 1960. Their kit includes red, green and white shirts, black shorts and black socks. The federation does not have a full-time dedicated employee working on women's football. Women's football is represented on the federation by specific constitutional mandate. FIFA suspended Kenya from all football activities for three months in 2004, due to the interference of the government in football activities. The ban was reversed after the country agreed to create new statutes. On October 25, 2006, Kenya was suspended again from international football for failing to fulfill a January 2006 agreement made to resolve recurrent problems in their football federation. FIFA announced that the suspension would be in force until the federation complies with the agreements previously reached. Rachel Kamweru is the Kenyan women football national chairperson. COSAFA and FIFA reaffirmed a commitment to women's football in the East African countries of Kenya, Ethiopia, Uganda and Tanzania in 2010. on 16 June 2024, Kenya qualified for the FIFA U-17 Women's World Cup for the first time in their history after defeating Burundi with 5-0 goals to qualify for the Dominican Republic.

== Competitive record ==
=== FIFA U-17 Women's World Cup ===
Year	Result	Pld	W	D	L	GF	GA
(New Zealand) 2008	Did not qualify						
(Trinidad and Tobago) 2010	Did not qualify						
(Azerbaijan) 2012	Did not qualify						
(Costa Rica) 2014	Did not qualify						
(Jordan) 2016	Did not qualify						
(Uruguay) 2018	Did not qualify						
(India) 2022	Did not qualify						
(Dominican Republic) 2024	Group stage	3	1	0	2	2	6
(Morocco) 2025	Did not qualify						
(Morocco) 2026	Round of 16	4	1	0	3	6	12
(Morocco) 2027	To be determined						
(Morocco) 2028	To be determined						
(Morocco) 2029	To be determined						
Total	2/13	7	2	0	5	8	18

== Head-to-head record ==
The following table shows Kenya's head-to-head record in the FIFA U-17 Women's World Cup.

Opponent	Pld	W	D	L	GF	GA	GD	Win %
China	1	0	0	1	0	3	−3	0.00
England	1	0	0	1	0	2	−2	0.00
Japan					—			
Mexico	1	1	0	0	2	1	+1	100.00
North Korea	1	0	0	1	0	3	−3	0.00
Samoa	1	1	0	0	4	0	+4	100.00
United States	1	0	0	1	1	6	−5	0.00
Total	6	2	0	4	7	15	−8	33.33
