= South Sudan women's national under-17 football team =

The South Sudan women's national under-17 football team is a national association football youth team of Somalia and is controlled by the South Sudan Football Association (S.S.F.A.), a member of the Confederation of African Football (CAF). They made their international debut at the 2026 CECAFA Women's U-17 Championship.

== See also ==
- Football in South Sudan
- South Sudan national under-17 football team
