= Sudan women's national under-17 football team =

The Sudan women's national under-17 football team is a national association football youth team of Sudan and is controlled by the Sudan Football Association. The 2026 CECAFA Women's U-17 Championship was the country's first appearance in women's football since the start of the Sudanese civil war. The team captain is Nura Mohamed.

== See also ==
- Women's football in Sudan
