= 2020 African U-17 Women's World Cup qualification =

Tournament details
- Dates: 10 January – 14 March 2020 (remaining matches cancelled)
- Teams: 20 (from 1 confederation)

Tournament statistics
- Matches played: 23
- Goals scored: 101 (4.39 per match)
- Top scorer(s): (Ghana) Ophelia Amponsah (Tanzania) Aisha Masaka (Uganda) Juliet Nalukenge (5 goals each)

The 2020 African U-17 Women's World Cup Qualifying Tournament was the 7th edition of the African U-17 Women's World Cup Qualifying Tournament, the biennial international youth football competition organised by the Confederation of African Football (CAF) to determine which women's under-17 national teams from Africa qualify for the FIFA U-17 Women's World Cup. Players born on or after 1 January 2003 were eligible to compete in the tournament.

Three teams would have qualified from this tournament for the 2021 FIFA U-17 Women's World Cup (originally 2020 but postponed due to COVID-19 pandemic) in India as the CAF representatives. However, FIFA announced on 17 November 2020 that this edition of the World Cup would be cancelled. As a result, all remaining qualifying matches were cancelled.

== Draw ==
A total of 20 (out of 54) CAF member national teams entered the qualifying rounds. The draw was held on 10 May 2020 at the CAF headquarters in Cairo, Egypt.

- In the preliminary round, the 16 teams were drawn into eight ties, with teams divided into four pots based on their geographical zones and those in the same pot drawn to play against each other.
- In the first round, the eight preliminary round winners and the four teams receiving byes to the first round were allocated into six ties based on the preliminary round tie numbers, with four preliminary round winners playing against the four teams receiving byes, and the other four preliminary round winners playing against each other.
- In the second round, the six first round winners were allocated into three ties based on the first round tie numbers.

Bye to first round (4 teams)	Preliminary round entrants (16 teams)			
Bye to first round (4 teams)	Pot A (4 from COSAFA)	Pot B (5 from CECAFA + 1 from UNAF)	Pot C (2 from UNIFFAC)	Pot D (3 from WAFU A + 1 from WAFU B)
Cameroon; Ghana; Nigeria; South Africa	Botswana; Namibia **(W)**; Zambia; Zimbabwe	Burundi; Djibouti; Ethiopia; Tanzania; Uganda; Morocco	DR Congo; São Tomé and Príncipe	Guinea; Guinea-Bissau; Liberia; Niger

Notes

- Teams in **bold** qualified for the World Cup.
- (W): Withdrew after draw

Did not enter

- Algeria
- Angola
- Benin
- Burkina Faso
- Cape Verde
- Central African Republic
- Chad
- Comoros
- Congo
- Egypt
- Equatorial Guinea
- Eritrea
- Eswatini
- Gabon
- Gambia
- Ivory Coast
- Kenya
- Lesotho
- Libya
- Madagascar
- Malawi
- Mali
- Mauritania
- Mauritius
- Mozambique
- Rwanda
- Senegal
- Seychelles
- Sierra Leone
- Somalia
- South Sudan
- Sudan
- Togo
- Tunisia

== Format ==
Qualification ties were played on a home-and-away two-legged basis. If the aggregate score was tied after the second leg, the away goals rule was applied, and if still tied, the penalty shoot-out (no extra time) was used to determine the winner.

== Schedule ==
The schedule of the qualifying rounds was as follows.

Due to the COVID-19 pandemic, all second round matches, originally scheduled for 1–3 and 8–10 May 2020, had been postponed until further notice. The CAF announced the new dates in July 2020. However, in October 2020, CAF announced that all third round matches, rescheduled for 30 October – 1 November and 20–22 November 2020, were again postponed due to travel restrictions across parts of Africa as a result of COVID-19. The CAF sent a letter to the member associations on 21 December 2020 confirming the cancellation of the qualifiers.

Round	Leg	Date
Preliminary round	First leg	10–12 January 2020
Preliminary round	Second leg	24–26 January 2020
First round	First leg	28 February–1 March 2020
First round	Second leg	13–15 March 2020
Second round	First leg	1–3 May 2020, postponed to 30 October – 1 November 2020, eventually cancelled
Second round	Second leg	15–17 May 2020, postponed to 20–22 November 2020, eventually cancelled

== Bracket ==
The three winners of the second round would have qualified for the 2021 FIFA U-17 Women's World Cup.

Preliminary round
Namibia	—	—
Zambia	—	—	w/o
Botswana	5	2	7
Zimbabwe	0	0	0
Djibouti	0	0	0
Morocco	7	7	14

First round
Zambia	2	0	2
South Africa	0	3	3
Botswana	0	0	0
Morocco	1	3	4

Second round
South Africa
Morocco

Preliminary round
Tanzania	5	1	6
Burundi	1	0	1
Uganda	2	3	5
Ethiopia	0	1	1
São Tomé and Príncipe	—	—	w/o
DR Congo	—	—

First round
Tanzania	2	0	2
Uganda	1	5	6
São Tomé and Príncipe	0	0	0
Cameroon	4	6	10

Second round
Uganda
Cameroon

Preliminary round
Liberia	4	5	9
Niger	0	0	0
Guinea	5	3	8
Guinea-Bissau	0	3	3

First round
Liberia	0	0	0
Ghana	2	8	10
Guinea	1	1	2
Nigeria	6	5	11

Second round
Ghana
Nigeria

== Preliminary round ==
Team 1	Agg.	Team 2	1st leg	2nd leg
Namibia	w/o	Zambia	—	—
Botswana	7–0	Zimbabwe	5–0	2–0
Djibouti	0–14	Morocco	0–7	0–7
Tanzania	6–1	Burundi	5–1	1–0
Uganda	5–1	Ethiopia	2–0	3–1
São Tomé and Príncipe	w/o	DR Congo	—	—
Liberia	9–0	Niger	4–0	5–0
Guinea	8–3	Guinea-Bissau	5–0	3–3

11 January 2020
--:-- UTC+2

Namibia	Cancelled	Zambia
	Report (Soccerway)

Sam Nujoma Stadium, Windhoek
25 January 2020
--:-- UTC+2

Zambia	Cancelled	Namibia
	Report (Soccerway)

Zambia won on walkover after Namibia withdrew, citing financial constraints.

10 January 2020
18:00 UTC+2

Botswana	5–0	Zimbabwe
Tlhapi 38'; Modise 72'; Sedirwa 76', 90'; Motlogelwa 88' (pen.)	Report (Soccerway)

National Stadium, Gaborone
26 January 2020
15:00 UTC+2

Zimbabwe	0–2	Botswana
	Report (Soccerway)	Manewe 59'; Munyatsi 84'

Barbourfields Stadium, Bulawayo

Botswana won 7–0 on aggregate.

10 January 2020
17:00 UTC+3

Djibouti	0–7	Morocco
	Report (Soccerway)	Errakas 4'; Temmar 17'; Heddiya 27'; Jbilou 44'; Stiten 55'; Knia 89'; Nassiri 90'

El Hadj Hassan Gouled Aptidon Stadium, Djibouti
24 January 2020
15:00 UTC+1

Morocco	7–0	Djibouti
Knia 31', 65', 78'; Jbilou 41', 87'; Errakas 38'; Erroudani 71' (pen.)	Report (Soccerway)

Stade Boubker Ammar, Salé
Referee: Vincentia Amedome (Togo)

Morocco won 14–0 on aggregate.

12 January 2020
16:00 UTC+3

Tanzania	5–1	Burundi
Masaka 13', 17', 61'; Meshack 38'; Mbunda 45'	Report (Soccerway)	Karenzo 75'

National Stadium, Dar es Salaam
Referee: Agnetta Napangor (Kenya)
25 January 2020
15:00 UTC+2

Burundi	0–1	Tanzania
	Report (Soccerway)	Mbunda 33'

Prince Louis Rwagasore Stadium, Bujumbura

Tanzania won 6–1 on aggregate.

11 January 2020
16:00 UTC+3

Uganda	2–0	Ethiopia
Nalukenge 4'; Nagaddya 85'	Report (Soccerway)

Startimes Stadium, Kampala
Referee: Khadmallah Koko (Sudan)
26 January 2020
16:00 UTC+3

Ethiopia	1–3	Uganda
Kalsa 61' (pen.)	Report (Soccerway)	Kunihira 55'; Nalukenge 64', 78'

Bahir Dar Stadium, Bahir Dar
Referee: Aline Umutoni (Rwanda)

Uganda won 5–1 on aggregate.

11 January 2020
15:00 UTC+0

São Tomé and Príncipe	Cancelled	DR Congo
	Report (Soccerway)

Estádio Nacional 12 de Julho, São Tomé
25 January 2020
--:-- UTC+1

DR Congo	Cancelled	São Tomé and Príncipe
	Report (Soccerway)

São Tomé and Príncipe won on walkover after DR Congo did not appear for the first leg.

12 January 2020
16:00 UTC+0

Liberia	4–0	Niger
Kallon 13'; Kieh 29' (pen.), 75', 84' (pen.)	Report (Soccerway)

Antoinette Tubman Stadium, Monrovia
Referee: Aïssata Boudy Lam (Mauritania)
26 January 2020
16:00 UTC+1

Niger	0–5	Liberia
	Report (Soccerway)	Kallon 39', 63'; Gebah 58'; Kieh 89'; Jackson 90+2'

Stade Général Seyni Kountché, Niamey
Referee: Bijou Mayinga (DR Congo)

Liberia won 9–0 on aggregate.

11 January 2020
16:00 UTC+0

Guinea	5–0	Guinea-Bissau
Dédé 30', 81'; Samoura 52'; N. Camara 61', 63'	Report (Soccerway)

Stade du 28 Septembre, Conakry
Referee: Folusho Ajayi (Nigeria)
25 January 2020
16:00 UTC+0

Guinea-Bissau	3–3	Guinea
Cissé 3' (pen.), 35', 70'	Report (Soccerway)	N. Camara 23'; Essomba 25'; M. Camara 51'

Estádio 24 de Setembro, Bissau

Guinea won 8–3 on aggregate.

== First round ==
Team 1	Agg.	Team 2	1st leg	2nd leg
Zambia	2–3	South Africa	2–0	0–3
Botswana	0–4	Morocco	0–1	0–3 (awd.)
Tanzania	2–6	Uganda	2–1	0–5
São Tomé and Príncipe	0–10	Cameroon	0–4	0–6
Liberia	0–10	Ghana	0–2	0–8
Guinea	2–11	Nigeria	1–6	1–5

28 February 2020
15:00 UTC+2

Zambia	2–0	South Africa
Malunga 18'; E. Banda 42'	Report (Soccerway)

Nkoloma Stadium, Lusaka
14 March 2020
15:00 UTC+2

South Africa	3–0	Zambia
Wade 12'; Gamede 72'; Taiwe 79'	Report (Soccerway)

Bidvest Stadium, Johannesburg
Referee: Salima Mukansanga (Rwanda)

South Africa won 3–2 on aggregate.

28 February 2020
18:00 UTC+2

Botswana	0–1	Morocco
	Report (Soccerway)	Temmar 22'

National Stadium, Gaborone
Referee: Jonesia Rukyaa (Tanzania)
14 March 2020
15:00 UTC+1

Morocco	3–0 Awarded	Botswana
	Report (Soccerway)

Stade Boubker Ammar, Salé
Referee: Sylvina Garnett (Liberia)

Morocco won 4–0 on aggregate and awarded as a 3–0 after Botswana did not appear for the second leg due to concerns of the COVID-19 pandemic.

1 March 2020
15:00 UTC+3

Tanzania	2–1	Uganda
Masaka 28', 88'	Report (Soccerway)	Najjemba 6'

National Stadium, Dar es Salaam
Referee: Ema Novo (Mozambique)
14 March 2020
16:00 UTC+3

Uganda	5–0	Tanzania
Kunihira 43'; Najjemba 74'; Aluka 77'; Nalukenge 87', 90+2'	Report (Soccerway)

Startimes Stadium, Kampala
Attendance: 7,000

Uganda won 6–2 on aggregate.

1 March 2020
13:00 UTC+0

São Tomé and Príncipe	0–4	Cameroon
	Report (Soccerway)	Wabeua 14', 44'; Tabé 45'; Michelle 70'

Estádio Nacional 12 de Julho, São Tomé
14 March 2020
15:30 UTC+1

Cameroon	6–0	São Tomé and Príncipe
Tabé 27', 45'; Mbiandji 35'; Ndome 47'; Bihina 68' (pen.); Luma 76'	Report (Soccerway)

Stade de Ngoa-Ekellé, Yaoundé
Referee: Anaelle Omanda (Gabon)

Cameroon won 10–0 on aggregate.

1 March 2020
16:00 UTC+0

Liberia	0–2	Ghana
	Report (Soccerway)	Amponsah 63'; Abdulai 87'

Antoinette Tubman Stadium, Monrovia
Referee: Fatou Thioune (Senegal)
14 March 2020
15:00 UTC+0

Ghana	8–0	Liberia
Amponsah 2', 3', 12', 14'; Abdulai 4'; Oppong 27'; Sarpong 64' (pen.); Twum 66'	Report (Soccerway)

Accra Sports Stadium, Accra
Referee: Patience Madu (Nigeria)

Ghana won 10–0 on aggregate.

7 March 2020 (Note: Guinea's home match against Nigeria was postponed to 7 March 2020 due to a clash with the 2020 Guinean legislative election.)
16:30 UTC+0

Guinea	1–6	Nigeria
Dédé 81'	Report (Soccerway)	Kalu 3'; Samuel 25', 85', 90+1'; Imuran 38', 65'

Stade du 28 Septembre, Conakry
14 March 2020
16:00 UTC+1

Nigeria	5–1	Guinea
Imuran 27'; Lawal 33', 40'; Dah-Zossu 86'; Kalu 90'	Report (Soccerway)	Dédé 84' (pen.)

Agege Stadium, Lagos
Attendance: 4,000

Nigeria won 11–1 on aggregate.

== Second round ==
Winners would have qualified for 2021 FIFA U-17 Women's World Cup.

Team 1	Agg.	Team 2	1st leg	2nd leg
South Africa	Match 15	Morocco	—	—
Uganda	Match 16	Cameroon	—	—
Ghana	Match 17	Nigeria	—	—

== Goalscorers ==
There were 101 goals scored in 23 matches, for an average of 4.39 goals per match.

5 goals

- (Ghana) Ophelia Amponsah
- (Tanzania) Aisha Masaka
- (Uganda) Juliet Nalukenge

4 goals

- (Guinea) Fatoumata Dédé
- (Liberia) Blessing Kieh
- (Morocco) Khaoula Knia

3 goals

- (Cameroon) Brenda Tabé
- (Guinea) Nana Camara
- (Guinea-Bissau) Fatoumata Cissé
- (Liberia) Mamie Kallon
- (Morocco) Hajar Errakas
- (Morocco) Hajar Jbilou
- (Nigeria) Rofiat Imuran
- (Nigeria) Yemisi Samuel

2 goals

- (Botswana) Dimpho Sedirwa
- (Cameroon) Doly Wabeua
- (Ghana) Salamatu Abdulai
- (Morocco) Salma Temmar
- (Nigeria) Chinyere Kalu
- (Nigeria) Taiwo Lawal
- (Tanzania) Protasia Mbunda
- (Uganda) Margret Kunihira
- (Uganda) Fauzia Najjemba

1 goal

- (Botswana) Peggy Manewe
- (Botswana) Jessica Modise
- (Botswana) Lorato Motlogelwa
- (Botswana) Christina Munyatsi
- (Botswana) Precious Tlhapi
- (Burundi) Lydia Karenzo
- (Cameroon) Michaely Bihina
- (Cameroon) Larissa Luma
- (Cameroon) Suzie Mbiandji
- (Cameroon) Ngo Nka’a Michelle
- (Cameroon) Elise Ndome
- (Ethiopia) Aregash Kalsa
- (Ghana) Elizabeth Oppong
- (Ghana) Alice Sarpong
- (Ghana) Tracy Twum
- (Guinea) Makoto Camara
- (Guinea) Odia Essomba
- (Guinea) Fatoumata Samoura
- (Liberia) Melissa Gebah
- (Liberia) Ewardline Jackson
- (Morocco) Oumaima Heddiya
- (Morocco) Wissal Nassiri
- (Morocco) Salma Stiten
- (Nigeria) Alvine Dah-Zossu
- (South Africa) Nelly Gamede
- (South Africa) Kananelo Taiwe
- (South Africa) Jessica Wade
- (Tanzania) Joyce Meshack
- (Uganda) Grace Aluka
- (Uganda) Catherine Nagaddya
- (Zambia) Esther Banda
- (Zambia) Dorica Malunga
