= 2025 COSAFA U-17 Girls' Championship =

COSAFA U-17 Girls' Championship 2025

Tournament details
- Host country: Namibia
- City: Windhoek
- Dates: 10–17 May
- Teams: 9 (from 1 sub-confederation)
- Venue(s): 1 (in 1 host city)

Final positions
- Champions: Zambia (3rd title)
- Runners-up: Malawi
- Third place: Mozambique
- Fourth place: Zimbabwe

Tournament statistics
- Matches played: 13
- Goals scored: 76 (5.85 per match)
- Top scorer(s): (Namibia) Nancy Lebang (7 goals)
- Best player(s): (Zambia) Ruth Mukoma
- Best goalkeeper: (Zambia) Bukata Kakumbi
- Fair play award: Malawi

The 2025 COSAFA U-17 Girls' Championship was the sixth edition of the COSAFA U-17 Girls' Championship, the international women's youth football championship contested by the under-17 national teams of the member associations of COSAFA. Namibia hosted the tournament from 10 to 17 May 2025. A total of nine teams played in the tournament, with players born on or after 1 January 2008 eligible to participate.

Zambia were the defending champions, having triumphed over Lesotho 15–0 in last year's final. and they successfully retained their title by defeating Malawi 3–0 in the final.

== Participating teams ==
A total of 9 out of 14 COSAFA member associations entered the tournament.

Team	App	Last	Previous best performance
Botswana	5th	2024	Runners-up (2021)
Comoros	5th	2024	Group Stage (2019, 2020, 2022, 2024)
Lesotho	2nd	2024	Runners-up (2024)
Malawi	3rd	2024	Third place (2022)
Mauritius	3rd	2024	Group Stage (2019, 2024)
Mozambique	2nd	2024	Semi-finals (2024)
Namibia	4th	2024	Group Stage (2021, 2022, 2024)
Zambia	6th	2024	Champions (2021, 2024, 2025)
Zimbabwe	3rd	2024	Group Stage (2020, 2024)

Did not enter

- Angola
- Eswatini
- Madagascar
- Seychelles
- South Africa

== Group stage ==
All times are local, CAT (UTC+2).

=== Group A ===
Pos	Team	Pld	W	D	L	GF	GA	GD	Pts	Qualification
1	Malawi	2	2	0	0	9	0	+9	6	Knockout stage
2	Namibia (H)	2	1	0	1	10	3	+7	3	
3	Comoros	2	0	0	2	0	16	−16	0	

Source: COSAFA
Rules for classification: 1) Points; 2) head-to-head matches; 3) Goal difference; 4) Number of goals scored.
(H) Hosts
10 May 2025
15:00

Namibia	0–3	Malawi
	Report	Hangula 24' (o.g.); Tambala 32'; Umali 90+3'

Hage Geingob Stadium, Windhoek
Referee: Luvhengo Maduvha (South Africa)
Woman of the match: Talandira Kachala (Malawi)

11 May 2025
15:00

Malawi	6–0	Comoros
Umali 12', 23', 79'; Nyirenda 37', 50'; Mzima 47'	Report

Hage Geingob Stadium, Windhoek
Referee: Lipontsa Lebuka (Lesotho)
Woman of the match: Faluna Umali (Malawi)

13 May 2025
15:00

Namibia	10–0	Comoros
Lebang 4', 13', 23', 25', 27', 35', 45+2'; Gawas 24'; Awases 47'; Eises 86'	Report

Hage Geingob Stadium, Windhoek
Referee: Luvhengo Maduvha (South Africa)
Woman of the match: Nancy Lebang (Namibia)

=== Group B ===
Pos	Team	Pld	W	D	L	GF	GA	GD	Pts	Qualification
1	Zambia	2	2	0	0	13	0	+13	6	Knockout stage
2	Mozambique	2	1	0	1	11	4	+7	3	Knockout stage
3	Mauritius	2	0	0	2	0	20	−20	0	

Source: COSAFA
Rules for classification: 1) Points; 2) head-to-head matches; 3) Goal difference; 4) Number of goals scored.
10 May 2025
12:00

Zambia	4–0	Mozambique
Mukoma 6', 81'; Phiri 36'; Kasema 77'	Report

Hage Geingob Stadium, Windhoek
Referee: Euphrasie Tsaramanana (Madagascar)
Woman of the match: Ruth Mukoma (Zambia)

12 May 2025
12:00

Mozambique	11–0	Mauritius
Victoria 12'; Fátima 18'; Edite Fernando 37'; Sunila 45+3'; Armance 62' (o.g.); Yumna 68'; Thandy 73'; Jéssica 85', 90+1', 90+4'; Yolanda 87'	Report

Hage Geingob Stadium, Windhoek
Referee: Deidrey Roucou (Seychelles)
Woman of the match: Sunila (Mozambique)

13 May 2025
12:00

Zambia	9–0	Mauritius
Mazimba 20'; Banda 24', 64', 76'; Mukoma 33'; Makoti 48'; Mwape 73', 80'; Ngabwe 90+1'	Report

Hage Geingob Stadium, Windhoek
Referee: Delcia Katchingavisa (Angola)
Woman of the match: Hellen Banda (Zambia)

=== Group C ===
Pos	Team	Pld	W	D	L	GF	GA	GD	Pts	Qualification
1	Zimbabwe	2	1	0	1	12	5	+7	3	Knockout stage
2	Botswana	2	1	0	1	3	1	+2	3	
3	Lesotho	2	1	0	1	3	12	−9	3	

Source: COSAFA
Rules for classification: 1) Points; 2) head-to-head matches; 3) Goal difference; 4) Number of goals scored.
11 May 2025
12:00

Lesotho	1–0	Botswana
Molete 18'	Report

Hage Geingob Stadium, Windhoek
Referee: Kwandile Somtsai (South Africa)
Woman of the match: Thato Molete (Lesotho)

12 May 2025
15:00

Botswana	3–0	Zimbabwe
Lesotlo 39' (pen.), 59'; Kgotle 67'	Report

Hage Geingob Stadium, Windhoek
Referee: Euphrasie Tsaramanana (Madagascar)
Woman of the match: Gorata Kgotle (Botswana)

14 May 2025
15:00

Lesotho	2–12	Zimbabwe
Molise 52'; Leholi 55' (pen.)	Report	Munyanduki 3', 21', 46', 69'; Mapuwa 23', 33', 36', 49'; Khumalo 43'; Chinyoka 75', 86'; Chisuro 88'

Hage Geingob Stadium, Windhoek
Referee: Luvhengo Maduvha (South Africa)
Woman of the match: Mya Munyanduki (Zimbabwe)

=== Ranking of second-placed teams ===
The best second-placed team from all groups qualifies for the semi-finals.

Pos	Grp	Team	Pld	W	D	L	GF	GA	GD	Pts	Qualification
1	B	Mozambique	2	1	0	1	11	4	+7	3	Semi-finals
2	A	Namibia	2	1	0	1	10	3	+7	3	
3	C	Botswana	2	1	0	1	3	1	+2	3	

Source: COSAFA
Rules for classification: Group stage tiebreakers

== Knockout stage ==
- In the knockout stage, penalty shoot-out will be used to decide the winner if necessary.

=== Bracket ===
Semi-finals
16 May – Windhoek
Zambia	5
Zimbabwe	1
16 May – Windhoek
Malawi	1
Mozambique	0

Final
17 May – Windhoek
Zambia	3
Malawi	0
Third place
17 May – Windhoek
Zimbabwe	2
Mozambique	3

=== Semi-finals ===
16 May 2025
12:00

Zambia	5–1	Zimbabwe
Kasema 36', 90+1'; Banda 62'; Njobvu 81'; Phiri 83'	Report	Mapuwa 74'

Hage Geingob Stadium, Windhoek
Referee: Lipontsa Lebuka (Lesotho)
Woman of the match: Hellen Banda (Zambia)

16 May 2025
15:00

Malawi	1–0	Mozambique
Kachala 84'	Report

Hage Geingob Stadium, Windhoek
Referee: Delcia Katchingavisa (Angola)
Woman of the match: Faluna Umali (Malawi)

=== Third place game ===
17 May 2025
12:00

Zimbabwe	2–3	Mozambique
Mugute 21'; Mapuwa 67'	Report	Thandy 7'; Nyamucherera 22' (o.g.); Jéssica 83'

Hage Geingob Stadium, Windhoek
Referee: Delcia Katchingavisa (Angola)
Woman of the match: Jéssica (Mozambique)

=== Final ===
17 May 2025
15:00

Zambia	3–0	Malawi
Mukoma 23'; Kasema 28'; Mazimba 45+4'	Report

Hage Geingob Stadium, Windhoek
Referee: Euphrasie Tsaramanana (Madagascar)
Woman of the match: Taonga Mubanga (Zambia)

== Goalscorers ==
There have been 73 goals scored in 12 matches, for an average of 6.08 goals per match (as of 17 May 2025).

7 goals

- (Namibia) Nancy Lebang

6 goals

- (Zimbabwe) Winne Mapuwa

4 goals

- (Malawi) Faluna Umali
- (Mozambique) Jéssica Andicene
- (Zambia) Hellen Banda
- (Zambia) Natasha Kasema
- (Zambia) Ruth Mukoma
- (Zimbabwe) Mya Munyanduki

2 goals

- (Botswana) Hope Lesotlo
- (Malawi) Alinafe Nyirenda
- (Mozambique) Thandy Nassone
- (Zambia) Gift Mazimba
- (Zambia) Precious Mwape
- (Zambia) Grace Phiri
- (Zimbabwe) Alicia Chinyoka

1 goal

- (Botswana) Gorata Kgotle
- (Lesotho) Malehlohonolo Leholi
- (Lesotho) Thato Molete
- (Lesotho) Boiketlo Molise
- (Malawi) Talandira Kachala
- (Malawi) Cecilia Mzima
- (Malawi) Ethel Tambala
- (Mozambique) Yumna Bila
- (Mozambique) Edite Fernando
- (Mozambique) Fátima Houana
- (Mozambique) Sunila Luckubary
- (Mozambique) Victoria Tennyson
- (Mozambique) Yolanda Zavale
- (Namibia) Khloe Awases
- (Namibia) Grace Eises
- (Namibia) Melania Gawas
- (Zambia) Esther Makoti
- (Zambia) Esther Ngabwe
- (Zambia) Beatrice Njobvu
- (Zimbabwe) Perpetua Chisuro
- (Zimbabwe) Chiedza Khumalo
- (Zimbabwe) Shantell Mugute

1 own goal

- (Mauritius) Kerrie Armance (against Mozambique)
- (Namibia) Renalda Hangula (against Malawi)
- (Zimbabwe) Ivy Nyamucherera (against Mozambique)
