= 2026 African U-17 Women's World Cup qualification =

African Qualifiers of the U-17 Women's World Cup 2026
Tournament details
- Dates: 10 April – 12 July 2026
- Teams: 31 (from 1 confederation)

The 2026 African U-17 Women's World Cup qualification is the upcoming under-17 women's national football team competition that will determine the four teams joining the automatically qualified host team Morocco in the 2026 FIFA U-17 Women's World Cup final tournament. Players born on or after 1 January 2009 are eligible to participate.

== Format ==
The qualification compeitition consists of three rounds of home-and-away matches. Thirty teams will enter the first round, with one team exempted based on its performance across the last five editions of the qualification competition. The 15 winners advance to the second round, where they are joined by the exempted team. These 16 teams compete for eight places in the third round. The remaining eight teams then face off in four two-legged ties, with the four winners qualifying for the 2026 FIFA U-17 Women's World Cup.

=== Schedule ===
Schedule
Round	Leg	Date(s)	Teams
First round	First	10–12 April 2026	30
First round	Second	17–19 April 2026	30
Second round	First	22–24 May 2026	16
Second round	Second	29–31 May 2026	16
Third round	First	3–5 July 2026	8
Third round	Second	10–12 July 2026	8

== Entrants ==
A total of 31 (out of 53; excluding Morocco) CAF member associations registered teams for the competition. Malawi make their qualification debuts at/in this edition.

The following 22 associations have either previously fielded or currently field a women's under-17 team, or do not have one but opted not to participate:

- Angola
- Cape Verde
- Chad
- Comoros
- Congo
- Egypt
- Equatorial Guinea
- Eswatini
- Eritrea
- Gabon
- Gambia
- Guinea-Bissau
- Lesotho
- Madagascar
- Mali
- Mauritania
- Mauritius
- Mozambique
- São Tomé and Príncipe
- Seychelles
- Somalia
- Sudan

== Draw ==
External videos
- African Qualifiers – Draw
- Qualifiers of the U17 WWC 2026 - Draw

The draw was held on 10 January 2026 in Rabat, Morocco at 13:00 (UTC+1). The draw was conducted by Jacqui Shipanga.

=== Seeding ===
Seeding is determined according to criteria established by FIFA for the FIFA U-17 Women's World Cup, based on team performances across the last five editions, with greater weight given to the most recent tournaments. To take geographical considerations into account, neighboring zones are grouped where possible depending on the number of participating teams. The draw is organized into four pots, consisting of the two highest-seeded and the two lowest-seeded teams.

Bye to second round
Nigeria (Highest ranked)

Pot 1 (Note: Pot consisted of the highest-ranked teams from WAFU A, WAFU B, and UNIFFAC.)	Pot 2 (Note: Pot consisted of the lowest-ranked teams from WAFU A, WAFU B, and UNAF.)	Pot 3 (Note: Pot consisted of the highest-ranked teams from CECAFA and COSAFA)	Pot 4 (Note: Pot consisted of the lowest-ranked teams from CECAFA, COSAFA, and UNIFFAC.)
Cameroon; Ghana; Ivory Coast; Guinea; Benin; Liberia; Senegal	Burkina Faso; Niger; Sierra Leone; Togo; Algeria; Libya; Tunisia	Zambia; Kenya; Burundi; Tanzania; South Africa; Ethiopia; Djibouti; Uganda	Botswana; Malawi; Namibia; Rwanda; South Sudan; Zimbabwe; DR Congo; Central African Republic

To maintain geographical balance, teams from Pot 1 were paired with those from Pot 2, while Pot 3 teams were paired with Pot 4.

== First round ==
All match times listed are GMT, as listed by CAF. If the venue is located in a different time zone, the local time is also given in parentheses.

Team 1	Agg.	Team 2	1st leg	2nd leg
Niger	2–8	Guinea	2–5	0–3
Burkina Faso	3–5	Benin	3–1	0–4
Sierra Leone	2–1	Ivory Coast	0–0	2–1
Tunisia	2–3	Senegal	1–1	1–2
Algeria	1–11	Cameroon	1–5	0–6
Togo	0–8	Ghana	0–2	0–6
Libya	w/o	Liberia	—	—
Rwanda	1–4	Zambia	0–2	1–2
DR Congo	w/o	Djibouti	—	—
South Sudan	0–8	Ethiopia	0–2	0–6
Malawi	2–4	Burundi	1–2	1–2
Botswana	2–6	Tanzania	2–3	0–3
Central African Republic	w/o	South Africa	—	—
Zimbabwe	1–6	Uganda	0–2	1–4
Namibia	1–7	Kenya	1–2	0–5

14 April 2026
15:30 (16:30 UTC+1)

Niger	2–5	Guinea
Oumarou Issaka 45+3', 90+5' (pen.)	Report	Touré 19', 26', 33'; Kouyaté 58'; N. Camara 73'

Stade Général Seyni Kountché, Niamey
Referee: Ghada Mehat (Algeria)
18 April 2026
15:30 (16:30 UTC+1)

Guinea	3–0	Niger
Touré 37', 41'; F. Soumah 78'	Report

Stade Général Seyni Kountché, Niamey (Niger)
Referee: Aida Sy (Senegal)

11 April 2026
16:00

Burkina Faso	3–1	Benin
Sana 7', 14'; Simporé 20'	Report	Gandonou 70' (pen.)

Stade du 4 Août, Ouagadougou
Referee: Zouwaira Souley Sani (Niger)
17 April 2026
15:00

Benin	4–0	Burkina Faso
Gandonou 31', 50', 57', 90' (pen.)	Report

Stade de Kégué, Lomé (Togo)
Referee: Yacine Samassa (Mauritania)

11 April 2026
16:00

Sierra Leone	0–0	Ivory Coast
	Report

Charles Konan Banny Stadium, Yamoussoukro (Ivory Coast)
Referee: Ana Fernandes (Cape Verde)
17 April 2026
17:00

Ivory Coast	1–2	Sierra Leone
Boka 32'	Report	Sengeh 83'; Tua 90+4'

Charles Konan Banny Stadium, Yamoussoukro
Referee: Juliet Appiah (Ghana)

11 April 2026
13:00 (14:00 UTC+1)

Tunisia	1–1	Senegal
Ayachi 49'	Report	Diop 27'

Sousse Olympic Stadium, Sousse
Referee: Zakia El Grini (Morocco)
18 April 2026
16:00

Senegal	2–1	Tunisia
Faty 28'; Diène 52'	Report	Ben Mabrouk 63'

Stade Léopold Sédar Senghor, Dakar
Referee: Alima Diarra (Mali)

12 April 2026
15:00 (16:00 UTC+1)

Algeria	1–5	Cameroon
D. Benkhellat 11'	Report	Mimbama 32', 86'; Nkenhoung 48', 60'; Bikie 67'

Mustapha Tchaker Stadium, Blida
Referee: Noura Samir (Egypt)
18 April 2026
16:00 (17:00 UTC+1)

Cameroon	6–0	Algeria
Sekem 13', 45+1', 53'; Mimbama 18', 60', 76'	Report

Olembe Stadium, Yaoundé
Referee: Leticia Kenga (Central African Republic)

12 April 2026
16:00

Togo	0–2	Ghana
	Report	Mensah 16', 64'

Stade de Kégué, Lomé
Referee: Chancelle Ngakosso (Congo)
18 April 2026
15:30

Ghana	6–0	Togo
Gyekyewaa 7'; Shani 14', 43'; Amadu 20'; Mensah 77'; Wahab 90+3'	Report

Accra Sports Stadium, Accra
Referee: Laurande Offin (Benin)

17 April 2026
13:00 (15:00 UTC+2)

Rwanda	0–2	Zambia
	Report	Mwewa 6'; Phiri 19'

Kigali Pelé Stadium, Kigali
Referee: Joselyne Nsabimana (Burundi)
22 April 2026
13:00 (15:00 UTC+2)

Zambia	2–1	Rwanda
Kapulungo 74'; Kasema 82' (pen.)	Report	Uwabeza 9'

Levy Mwanawasa Stadium, Ndola
Referee: Mathapelo Morake (Lesotho)

12 April 2026
13:00 (15:00 UTC+2)

South Sudan	0–2	Ethiopia
	Report	Gizachew 23'; Ayele 33'

Juba National Stadium, Juba
Referee: Lucy Juma (Kenya)
19 April 2026
13:00 (16:00 UTC+3)

Ethiopia	6–0	South Sudan
S. Teshome 7'; Ayele 44', 52', 72'; Daniel 82', 90+4'	Report

Abebe Bikila Stadium, Addis Ababa
Referee: Asma Chouchane (Tunisia)

11 April 2026
13:00 (15:00 UTC+2)

Malawi	1–2	Burundi
Fabiano 14'	Report	Niyokwizera 25'; Tuyishemeze 50'

Bingu National Stadium, Lilongwe
18 April 2026
13:00 (15:00 UTC+2)

Burundi	2–1	Malawi
Nshizahabona 8'; Kezimana 12'	Report	Chilimba 53'

Intwari Stadium, Bujumbura
Referee: Tatu Malogo (Tanzania)

10 April 2026
13:00 (15:00 UTC+2)

Botswana	2–3	Tanzania
Setuke 37'; Lesotlo 71' (pen.)	Report	Hassan 14'; Steven 43'; Mlekwa 45+3'

Obed Itani Chilume Stadium, Francistown
Referee: Alaba Olufunmilayo (Nigeria)
19 April 2026
13:00 (16:00 UTC+3)

Tanzania	3–0	Botswana
Steven 60', 90+4'; Juma 84'	Report

Azam Complex Stadium, Dar es Salaam
Referee: Henriette Byukusenge (Rwanda)

12 April 2026
13:00 (15:00 UTC+2)

Zimbabwe	0–2	Uganda
	Report	Acen 11'; Nameseruka 15'

MWOS Ngoni Stadium, Harare
Referee: Nonjabulo Ndlela (South Africa)
18 April 2026
13:00 (16:00 UTC+3)

Uganda	4–1	Zimbabwe
Nassaka 10'; Acen 34'; Aketogwanga 43'; Oseko 86'	Report	Gwenhame 45+1'

FUFA Stadium Kadiba, Kampala
Referee: Greta Musimu (Congo DR)

12 April 2026
13:00 (15:00 UTC+2)

Namibia	1–2	Kenya
Awases 84'	Report	Atieno 3'; Boke 6'

UNAM Stadium, Windhoek
Referee: Grace Gimo (Zimbabwe)
18 April 2026
12:00 (15:00 UTC+3)

Kenya	5–0	Namibia
B. Achieng 46', 68', 81'; Adhiambo 54'; Opiyo 90+2'	Report

Ulinzi Sports Complex, Nairobi
Referee: Alphonsine Ilboudo (Burkina Faso)

== Second round ==
Team 1	Agg.	Team 2	1st leg	2nd leg
Guinea	0–11	Nigeria	0–5	0–6
Benin	5–1	Sierra Leone	3–0	2–1
Senegal	0–0 (5–4 p)	Cameroon	0–0	0–0
Ghana	8–0	Liberia	6–0	2–0
Zambia	7–0	DR Congo	5–0	2–0
Ethiopia	4–2	Burundi	2–1	2–1
Tanzania	0–2	South Africa	0–2	0–0
Uganda	1–1 (a)	Kenya	1–1	0–0

23 May 2026
16:00

Guinea	0–5	Nigeria
	Report	Chidi 1', 12', 39'; Adegbuyi 37'; Dunstan 56'

Felix Houphouet Boigny Stadium, Abidjan (Ivory Coast)
Referee: Dorsaf Ganouati (Tunisia)
31 May 2026
15:00 (16:00 UTC+1)

Nigeria	6–0	Guinea
Adegbuyi 9', 32'; Chidi 21', 34'; Joseph 23'; Oscar 70'	Report

Remo Stars Stadium, Ikenne
Referee: Sylvina Garnett (Liberia)

25 May 2026
15:00

Benin	3–0	Sierra Leone
Gandonou 16', 67'; Dogbé 57'	Report

Stade de Kégué, Lomé (Togo)
Referee: Abigael Olufunmilayo (Nigeria)
29 May 2026
16:00

Sierra Leone	1–2	Benin
Deen 23'	Report	Dangui 69'; Gandonou 77'

Stade de Kégué, Lomé (Togo)
Referee: Aïssatou Kanté (Guinea)

22 May 2026
17:00

Senegal	0–0	Cameroon
	Report

Stade Léopold Sédar Senghor, Dakar
Referee: Zakia El Grini (Morocco)
30 May 2026
14:00 (15:00 UTC+1)

Cameroon	0–0	Senegal
	Report
Penalties
Mimbama (penalty missed); Nkenhoung (penalty scored); Oyie (penalty scored); Madji (penalty scored); Ekodeck (penalty scored); Nguelly (penalty missed)	4–5	(penalty scored) Diop; (penalty missed) Barro; (penalty scored) D. Diallo; (penalty scored) Ndiaye; (penalty scored) Faty; (penalty scored) Fall

Ahmadou Ahidjo Stadium, Yaoundé
Referee: Greta Musimu (DR Congo)

23 May 2026
15:30

Ghana	6–0	Liberia
Abass 30'; Wahab 53' (pen.); Achiaa 57'; Appiah Asamoah 60'; Mensah 73'; Yeboah 88'	Report

Accra Sports Stadium, Accra
Referee: Natacha Konan (Ivory Coast)
30 May 2026
16:00

Liberia	0–2	Ghana
	Report	Wahab 15'; Gyekyewaa 51'

Samuel Kanyon Doe Sports Complex, Monrovia
Referee: Isatou Touray (Gambia)

23 May 2026
13:00 (15:00 UTC+2)

Zambia	5–0	DR Congo
Phiri 23'; Kasema 41' (pen.), 50', 64'; Mutale 90+5' (pen.)	Report

Levy Mwanawasa Stadium, Ndola
Referee: Rose Zimba (Malawi)
31 May 2026
13:00 (15:00 UTC+2)

DR Congo	0–2	Zambia
	Report	Muzuwa 68'; Mofya 90'

Stade Frederic Kibassa Maliba, Lubumbashi
Referee: Innocentia Ntangti (Cameroon)

24 May 2026
12:00 (15:00 UTC+3)

Ethiopia	2–1	Burundi
Eyasu 27', 30'	Report	Ndikumana 65'

Abebe Bikila Stadium, Addis Ababa
Referee: Aline Umutoni (Rwanda)
30 May 2026
13:00 (15:00 UTC+2)

Burundi	1–2	Ethiopia
Iranzi 5'	Report	Ayele 53'; Eyasu 73'

Intwari Stadium, Bujumbura

23 May 2026
12:00 (15:00 UTC+3)

Tanzania	0–2	South Africa
	Report	Khoza 3'; Jacobs 24'

Amaan Stadium, Zanzibar
Referee: Chancelle Ngakosso (Congo)
31 May 2026
13:00 (15:00 UTC+2)

South Africa	0–0	Tanzania
	Report

Lucas Moripe Stadium, Atteridgeville
Referee: Rosa Hanjavola (Madagascar)

22 May 2026
13:00 (16:00 UTC+3)

Uganda	1–1	Kenya
Nabirye 12'	Report	Adhiambo 60'

FUFA Stadium Kadiba, Kampala
Referee: Sisay Raya (Ethiopia)
30 May 2026
12:00 (15:00 UTC+3)

Kenya	0–0	Uganda
	Report

Nyayo National Stadium, Nairobi
Referee: Emmanuela Clement (South Sudan)

== Third round ==
Team 1	Agg.	Team 2	1st leg	2nd leg
Nigeria	8–5	Benin	3–2	5–3
Senegal	2–2 (6–7 p)	Ghana	1–1	1–1
Zambia	3–2	Ethiopia	2–1	1–1
South Africa	1–5	Kenya	0–2	1–3

4 July 2026
15:00 (16:00 UTC+1)

Nigeria	3–2	Benin
Joseph 25'; Adegbuyi 62'; Ifeanyi 75'	Report	Gandonou 14'; Dangui 73'

Remo Stars Stadium, Ikenne
Referee: Josphine Wanjiku (Kenya)
11 July 2026
16:00

Benin	3–5	Nigeria
Gandonou 9', 64'; Lokossou 56'	Report	Dunstan 6'; Stephen 14'; Joseph 20', 54' (pen.), 75'

Stade de Kégué, Lomé (Togo)
Referee: Shamirah Nabadda (Uganda)

3 July 2026
17:00

Senegal	1–1	Ghana
Faty 21' (pen.)	Report	Danso 86'

Stade Léopold Sédar Senghor, Dakar
Referee: Rachel Zihindula (Congo DR)
11 July 2026
15:30

Ghana	1–1	Senegal
Wahab 44'	Report	D. Diallo 10'
Penalties
Wahab (penalty scored); Essenam (penalty scored); Yeboah (penalty missed); Osman (penalty scored); Gyekyewaa (penalty scored); Achiaa (penalty scored); Amadu (penalty scored); Appiah Asamoah (penalty scored)	7–6	(penalty scored) Diop; (penalty scored) D. Diallo; (penalty scored) Ndiaye; (penalty scored) Coly; (penalty missed) Fall; (penalty scored) Barro; (penalty scored) Cissé I; (penalty missed) A. Diallo

Accra Sports Stadium, Accra
Referee: Antsino Twanyanyukwa (Namibia)

4 July 2026
13:00 (15:00 UTC+2)

Zambia	2–1	Ethiopia
Mwewa 14'; Muzuwa 54'	Report	Ayele 40'

Levy Mwanawasa Stadium, Ndola
Referee: Yacine Samassa (Mauritania)
12 July 2026
12:00 (15:00 UTC+3)

Ethiopia	1–1	Zambia
Ayele 88'	Report	Mwewa 46'

Abebe Bikila Stadium, Addis Ababa
Referee: Shahena El Maghrabi (Egypt)

4 July 2026
13:00 (15:00 UTC+2)

South Africa	0–2	Kenya
	Report	Boke 13'; Achieng 60'

Lucas Moripe Stadium, Atteridgeville
Referee: Rita Boateng-Nkansah (Ghana)
12 July 2026
12:00 (15:00 UTC+3)

Kenya	3–1	South Africa
Maloba 71'; Awour 86'; Opiyo 90+2'	Report	Malebana 5'

Nyayo National Stadium, Nairobi
Referee: Zoulaikha Harmasse (Morocco)

== Qualified teams for the 2026 FIFA U-17 Women's World Cup ==
The following five teams from CAF qualified for the 2026 FIFA U-17 Women's World Cup including Morocco who automatically qualified as host.

Team	Qualified on	Previous appearances in the FIFA U-17 Women's World Cup.
Morocco	14 March 2024	2 (2022, 2025)
Nigeria	11 July 2026	8 (2008, 2010, 2012, 2014, 2016, 2022, 2024, 2025)
Ghana	11 July 2026	6 (2008, 2010, 2012, 2014, 2016, 2018)
Zambia	12 July 2026	3 (2014, 2024, 2025)
Kenya	12 July 2026	1 (2024)

== See also ==
- 2026 Women's Africa Cup of Nations
- 2026 African U-20 Women's World Cup qualification
