= 2024 COSAFA U-17 Girls' Championship =

COSAFA U-17 Girls' Championship 2024
Campeonato Feminino Sub-17 COSAFA Moçambique 2024

Tournament details
- Host country: South Africa
- Dates: 4–13 December
- Teams: 12 (from 1 sub-confederation)
- Venue(s): 2 (in 1 host city)

Final positions
- Champions: Zambia (2nd title)
- Runners-up: Lesotho

Tournament statistics
- Matches played: 21
- Goals scored: 110 (5.24 per match)
- Top scorer(s): (Zambia) Mercy Chipasula (13 goals)
- Best player(s): (Zambia) Mercy Chipasula
- Best goalkeeper: (Zambia) Loveness Chingwele
- Fair play award: Lesotho

The 2024 COSAFA U-17 Girls' Championship (Portuguese: Campeonato Feminino Sub-17 COSAFA Moçambique 2024) is the fifth edition of the COSAFA U-17 Girls' Championship, the international women's youth football championship contested by the under-17 national teams of the member associations of COSAFA. It was initially scheduled to be hosted by Mozambique but has since been moved to South Africa.

South Africa were the defending champions having clinched their first title in the previous edition. however, they failed to defend their title after being eliminated in the group stage following a loss to Madagascar.

== Participating teams ==
A record 12 out of 14 COSAFA member associations entered the tournament, with hosts Mozambique, along with Eswatini and Lesotho, set to make their debut.

Team	App	Last	Previous best performance
Botswana	4th	2022	Runners-up (2021)
Comoros	4th	2022	Group Stage (2019, 2020, 2022)
Eswatini	1st	—	Debut
Lesotho	1st	—	Debut
Madagascar	2nd	2019	Group Stage (2019)
Malawi	2nd	2022	Third place (2022)
Mauritius	2nd	2019	Group Stage (2019)
Mozambique	1st	—	Debut
Namibia	3rd	2022	Group Stage (2021, 2022)
South Africa	4th	2022	Champions (2022)
Zambia	5th	2022	Champions (2021)
Zimbabwe	2nd	2020	Group Stage (2020)

Did not enter

- Angola
- Seychelles

=== Draw ===
The tournament draw took place on 6 September 2024.

== Group stage ==
All times are local, CAT (UTC+2).

=== Group A ===
Pos	Team	Pld	W	D	L	GF	GA	GD	Pts	Qualification
1	Mozambique	3	3	0	0	9	1	+8	9	Knockout stage
2	Lesotho	3	2	0	1	16	2	+14	6	Knockout stage
3	Eswatini	3	0	1	2	1	8	−7	1	
4	Comoros	3	0	1	2	0	15	−15	1	

Source: COSAFA
Rules for classification: 1) Points; 2) head-to-head matches; 3) Goal difference; 4) Number of goals scored.
4 December 2024
11:00

Eswatini	0–6	Lesotho
	Report	Molise 13', 75'; Tholo 24', 35'; Molete 44'; Lesala 82'

UJ Soweto Stadium, Johannesburg
Referee: Kwandile Somtsai (South Africa)
4 December 2024
14:00

Mozambique	5–0	Comoros
Teresa 5' (pen.), 59'; Ana 47', 65'; Judite 86'	Report

UJ Soweto Stadium, Johannesburg
Referee: 'Malehlohonolo Foloko (Lesotho)

6 December 2024
14:00

Comoros	0–10	Lesotho
	Report	Mampona 45'; Sooane 46'; Tholo 48', 68', 80', 82'; Molete 65'; Phiri 78'; Molise 89'; Lesala 90'

UJ Soweto Stadium, Johannesburg
Referee: Jabulile Mgabhi (Eswatini)
7 December 2024
9:00

Mozambique	2–1	Eswatini
Fátima 27'; Teresa 54'	Report	Maseko 23'

UJ AW Muller Stadium, Johannesburg
Referee: Luvhengo Maduvha (South Africa)

8 December 2024
11:00

Comoros	0–0	Eswatini
	Report

UJ B Soweto Stadium, Johannesburg
Referee: Anna Banda (Zambia)
8 December 2024
14:00

Mozambique	2–0	Lesotho
Ana 71'; Victoria 82'	Report

UJ B Soweto Stadium, Johannesburg
Referee: Watson Mustafa (Malawi)

=== Group B ===
Pos	Team	Pld	W	D	L	GF	GA	GD	Pts	Qualification
1	Madagascar	3	3	0	0	10	2	+8	9	Knockout stage
2	South Africa (H)	3	2	0	1	9	3	+6	6	
3	Malawi	3	1	0	2	10	9	+1	3	
4	Namibia	3	0	0	3	1	16	−15	0	

Source: COSAFA
Rules for classification: 1) Points; 2) head-to-head matches; 3) Goal difference; 4) Number of goals scored.
(H) Hosts
5 December 2024
9:00

South Africa	4–2	Malawi
Kock 23', 72', 88'; Malebana 35' (pen.)	Report	Mwanyongo 48'; Lali 88'

UJ AW Muller Stadium, Johannesburg
Referee: Lipontsa Lebuka (Lesotho)
5 December 2024
11:00

Namibia	0–5	Madagascar
	Report	Rasoamanantena 11'; Rakotoarisoa 27' (pen.); Nambininjanahary 35'; Odilicia 37'; Nomenjanahary 67'

UJ B Soweto Stadium, Johannesburg
Referee: Hloniphile Msezane (South Africa)

7 December 2024
11:00

Malawi	2–4	Madagascar
Umali 10', 74'	Report	Andrianarison 14', 36', 90'; Odilicia 38'

UJ B Soweto Stadium, Johannesburg
Referee: Kwandile Somtsai (South Africa)
7 December 2024
14:00

South Africa	5–0	Namibia
Sithole 9'; Khoza 29'; Mohale 32'; Levy 64', 86'	Report

UJ B Soweto Stadium, Johannesburg
Referee: Jabulile Mgabhi (Eswatini)

9 December 2024
9:00

South Africa	0–1	Madagascar
	Report	Rasoamanantena 18'

UJ Soweto Stadium, Johannesburg
Referee: 'Malehlohonolo Foloko (Lesotho)
9 December 2024
14:00

Malawi	6–1	Namibia
Mkwala 5'; Fyson 7', 30', 84'; Chinyamvula 22'; Mwanyongo 45'	Report	Lebang 76'

UJ B Soweto Stadium, Johannesburg
Referee: Jabulile Mgabhi (Eswatini)

=== Group C ===
Pos	Team	Pld	W	D	L	GF	GA	GD	Pts	Qualification
1	Zambia	3	3	0	0	20	2	+18	9	Knockout stage
2	Botswana	3	2	0	1	9	4	+5	6	
3	Zimbabwe	3	1	0	2	5	11	−6	3	
4	Mauritius	3	0	0	3	1	18	−17	0	

Source: COSAFA
Rules for classification: 1) Points; 2) head-to-head matches; 3) Goal difference; 4) Number of goals scored.
5 December 2024
14:00

Zimbabwe	2–1	Mauritius
Njere 8'; Khumalo 12'	Report	Clair 32'

UJ B Soweto Stadium, Johannesburg
Referee: Anna Banda (Zambia)
6 December 2024
11:00

Zambia	3–0	Botswana
Chipasula 36'; Nkaka 64'; Banda 90'	Report

UJ Soweto Stadium, Johannesburg
Referee: Watson Mustafa (Malawi)

8 December 2024
9:00

Botswana	6–0	Mauritius
Tokonyane 18'; Lesotlo 22'; Sebotho 30'; Kesetse 51', 87'; Merven 53' (o.g.)	Report

UJ Soweto Stadium, Johannesburg
Referee: Lipontsa Lebuka (Lesotho)
8 December 2024
11:00

Zambia	7–2	Zimbabwe
Chipasula 10', 46'; Phiri 25', 63'; Sekeseke 49', 82'; Hanongo 76' (pen.)	Report	Khumalo 7'; Gambiza 15'

UJ AW Muller Stadium, Johannesburg
Referee: Hloniphile Msezane (South Africa)

9 December 2024
9:00

Botswana	3–1	Zimbabwe
Kanyuru 42' (o.g.); Lesotlo 45'; Kesetse 62'	Report	Chinyoka 24'

UJ AW Muller Stadium, Johannesburg
Referee: Kwandile Somtsai (South Africa)
9 December 2024
11:00

Zambia	10–0	Mauritius
Nkaka 12', 45'; Chipasula 13', 41'; Phiri 15'; Sekeseke 26', 43', 71', 81'; Simiette 32' (o.g.)	Report

UJ B Soweto Stadium, Johannesburg
Referee: Luvhengo Maduvha (South Africa)

=== Ranking of second-placed teams ===
The best second-placed team from all groups qualifies for the semi-finals.

Pos	Grp	Team	Pld	W	D	L	GF	GA	GD	Pts	Qualification
1	A	Lesotho	3	2	0	1	16	2	+14	6	Semi-finals
2	B	South Africa	3	2	0	1	9	3	+6	6	
3	C	Botswana	3	2	0	1	9	4	+5	6	

Source: COSAFA
Rules for classification: Group stage tiebreakers

== Knockout stage ==
- In the knockout stage, penalty shoot-out will be used to decide the winner if necessary.

=== Bracket ===
Semi-finals
11 December – Johannesburg
Madagascar	0
Zambia	3
11 December – Johannesburg
Mozambique	0
Lesotho	1

Final
13 December – Johannesburg
Zambia	15
Lesotho	0

=== Semi-finals ===
11 December 2024
11:00

Madagascar	0–3	Zambia
	Report	Banda 12'; Phiri 33'; Chipasula 79'

UJ Soweto Stadium, Johannesburg
Referee: Watson Mustafa (Malawi)
11 December 2024
14:00

Mozambique	0–1	Lesotho
	Report	Sooane 90+4'

UJ Soweto Stadium, Johannesburg
Referee: Anna Banda (Zambia)

=== Final ===
13 December 2024
11:00

Zambia	15–0	Lesotho
Sekeseke 4', 57', 60'; Banda 6', 75'; Chipasula 9', 16', 37' (pen.), 52', 54', 63', 64'; Mwenda 42'; Chirwa 82'; Mwikisa 85'	Report

UJ Soweto Stadium, Johannesburg
Referee: Hloniphile Msezane (South Africa)

== Goalscorers ==
There were 110 goals scored in 21 matches, for an average of 5.24 goals per match.

13 goals

- (Zambia) Mercy Chipasula

9 goals

- (Zambia) Masela Sekeseke

6 goals

- (Lesotho) Ntsamaeng Tholo

4 goals

- (Zambia) Hellen Banda
- (Zambia) Grace Phiri

3 goals

- (Botswana) Keotshepile Kesetse
- (Lesotho) Boiketlo Molise
- (Madagascar) Volana Andrianarison
- (Malawi) Jean Fyson
- (Mozambique) Ana Armando
- (Mozambique) Teresa Gogolo
- (South Africa) Leonay Kock
- (Zambia) Natasha Nkaka

2 goals

- (Botswana) Hope Lesotlo
- (Lesotho) Tebello Lesala
- (Lesotho) Thato Molete
- (Lesotho) Nteboheleng Sooane
- (Madagascar) Angele Odilicia
- (Madagascar) Oliva Rasoamanantena
- (Malawi) Asimenye Mwanyongo
- (Malawi) Faluna Umali
- (South Africa) Nishaat Levy
- (Zimbabwe) Chiedza Khumalo

1 goal

- (Botswana) Shirley Tokonyane
- (Botswana) Amogelang Sebotho
- (Eswatini) Sphesihle Maseko
- (Lesotho) Lekenyane Mampona
- (Lesotho) Itumeleng Phiri
- (Madagascar) Louisa Nambininjanahary
- (Madagascar) Jiscaniah Nomenjanahary
- (Madagascar) Vola Rakotoarisoa
- (Malawi) Talandira Chinyamvula
- (Malawi) Fatima Lali
- (Malawi) Victoria Mkwala
- (Mauritius) Eloisha Clair
- (Mozambique) Judite Cumbi
- (Mozambique) Fátima Houana
- (Mozambique) Victoria Tennyson
- (Namibia) Nancy Lebang
- (South Africa) Katleho Malebana
- (South Africa) Katlego Mohale
- (South Africa) Khwezi Khoza
- (South Africa) Okuhle Sithole
- (Zambia) Janet Chirwa
- (Zambia) Lweendo Hanongo
- (Zambia) Lilian Mwenda
- (Zambia) Wendy Mwikisa
- (Zimbabwe) Alicia Chinyoka
- (Zimbabwe) Tatenda Gambiza
- (Zimbabwe) Anna Njere

1 own goal

- (Botswana) Hazel Kanyuru (against Zimbabwe)
- (Mauritius) Parissa Merven (against Botswana)
- (Mauritius) Fabiana Simiette (against Zambia)
