= Lesotho women's national under-17 football team =

National U-17 association football team

Lesotho
- Association: Lesotho Football Association
- Confederation: CAF (Africa)
- Sub-confederation: COSAFA (Southern Africa)
- Top scorer: Ntsamaeng Tholo (6 goals)
- FIFA code: LES
First colours	Second colours

First international
- Eswatini 0–6 Lesotho (Johannesburg, South Africa; 4 December 2024)

Biggest win
- Comoros 0–10 Lesotho (Johannesburg, South Africa; 6 December 2024)

Biggest defeat
- Zambia 15–0 Lesotho (Johannesburg, South Africa; 13 December 2024)

COSAFA U-17 Women's Championship
- Appearances: 1 (first in 2024)
- Best result: (silver) Runners-up (2024)

The Lesotho women's national under-17 team, is a youth football team, which represents Lesotho and is controlled by the Lesotho Football Association, the governing body for football in Lesotho. The team's main objective is to qualify and play at the FIFA U-17 Women's World Cup and develop players for the main national team Mehalalitoe.

== Team ==
In 2006, there was an official FIFA recognised under-17 team. From 2002 to 2005, the team did not play a single match. In 2006, they played three games. In 2006, the team had three training sessions a week.

== Competitive record ==
=== FIFA U-17 Women's World Cup record ===
FIFA U-17 Women's World Cup
Appearances: 0
Year	Round	Position	Pld	W	D	L	GF	GA
(New Zealand) 2008	did not enter							
(Trinidad and Tobago) 2010	did not enter							
(Azerbaijan) 2012	did not enter							
(Costa Rica) 2014	did not enter							
(Jordan) 2016	did not enter							
(Uruguay) 2018	did not enter							
(India) 2022	did not enter							
(Dominican Republic) 2024	did not enter							
(Morocco) 2025	TBD							
Total	TBD	0/9	0	0	0	0	0	0

=== African U-17 Cup of Nations for Women record ===
African U-17 Cup of Nations for Women
Appearances: 0
Year	Round	Position	Pld	W	D	L	GF	GA
2008	did not enter							
2010	did not enter							
2012	did not enter							
2013	did not enter							
2016	did not enter							
2018	did not enter							
2020	The 2020 FIFA U-17 Women's World Cup was cancelled due to the COVID-19 pandemic.							
2022	did not enter							
2024	did not enter							
2025	To be determined							
Total		0/6	0	0	0	0	0	0

=== COSAFA U-17 Women's Championship ===
COSAFA U-17 Women's Championship record
Year	Round	Pld	W	D*	L	GS	GA	GD
(Mauritius) 2019	did not enter							
(South Africa) 2020	did not enter							
(Malawi) 2022	did not enter							
(South Africa) 2024	Semi-finalist	4	2	0	2	16	17	-1
Total	Semi-finalist	3	0	1	2	1	8	
