= Eswatini women's national under-17 football team =

National U-17 association football team

Eswatini under-17
- Association: Eswatini Football Association
- Confederation: CAF
- Sub-confederation: COSAFA
- Head coach: Promise Vilakati
- Top scorer: Sphesihle Maseko (1 goal)
- FIFA code: SWZ

First international
- Eswatini 0–6Lesotho (Johannesburg, South Africa; 4 December 2024)

Biggest defeat
- Eswatini 0–6Lesotho (Johannesburg, South Africa; 4 December 2024)

COSAFA U-17 Women's Championship
- Appearances: 1 (first in 2024)
- Best result: Group Stage (2024)

The Eswatini women's national under-17 football team, is a youth football team, which represents Eswatini and is controlled by the Eswatini Football Association, the governing body for football in Eswatini. The team's main objective is to qualify and play at the FIFA U-17 Women's World Cup and develop players for the main national team Sitsebe Samhlekazi.

== History ==
The team made their COSAFA U-17 Girls' Championship debut in 2024. Their first game was a 6-0 loss to fellow debutants Lesotho. Sphesihle Maseko scored the only goal for the team at the 2024 COSAFA U-17 Girls' Championship.

== Results and fixtures ==
The following is a list of match results in the last 12 months, as well as any future matches that have been scheduled.

Legend

Win Draw Loss Fixture

=== Coaching history ===
Position	Name	Ref
Head Coach	(Eswatini) Promise Vilakati	
Assistant Coach	(Eswatini) Nkosinathi Lukhele	
Fitness Coach	(Eswatini) Ronnie Ginindza	
Goalkeeper Coach	(Eswatini) Sukoluhle Sibandze	

Coach	Nat	Tenure
Promise Vilakati	Eswatini	2024–

== Competitive record ==
=== FIFA U-17 Women's World Cup record ===
FIFA U-17 Women's World Cup
Appearances: 0
Year	Round	Position	Pld	W	D	L	GF	GA
(New Zealand) 2008	did not enter							
(Trinidad and Tobago) 2010	did not enter							
(Azerbaijan) 2012	did not enter							
(Costa Rica) 2014	did not enter							
(Jordan) 2016	did not enter							
(Uruguay) 2018	did not enter							
(India) 2022	did not enter							
(Dominican Republic) 2024	did not enter							
(Morocco) 2025	TBD							
Total	TBD	0/9	0	0	0	0	0	0

=== African U-17 Cup of Nations for Women record ===
African U-17 Cup of Nations for Women
Appearances: 6
Year	Round	Position	Pld	W	D	L	GF	GA
2008	did not enter							
2010	did not enter							
2012	did not enter							
2013	did not enter							
2016	did not enter							
2018	did not enter							
2020	The 2020 FIFA U-17 Women's World Cup was cancelled due to the COVID-19 pandemic.							
2022	did not enter							
2024	did not enter							
2025	To be determined							
Total		0/6	0	0	0	0	0	0

=== COSAFA U-17 Women's Championship ===
COSAFA U-17 Women's Championship record
Year	Round	Pld	W	D*	L	GS	GA	GD
(Mauritius) 2019	did not enter							
(South Africa) 2020	did not enter							
(Malawi) 2022	did not enter							
(South Africa) 2024	Group Stage	3	0	1	2	1	8	-7
Total		3	0	1	2	1	8	
