= 2022 COSAFA U-17 Women's Championship =

Tournament details
- Host country: Malawi
- Dates: 1–11 December 2022
- Teams: 6 (from 1 sub-confederation)
- Venue(s): 1 (in 1 host city)

Final positions
- Champions: South Africa (1st title)
- Runners-up: Zambia
- Third place: Malawi
- Fourth place: Botswana

Tournament statistics
- Matches played: 10
- Goals scored: 75 (7.5 per match)
- Top scorer(s): (Malawi) Rose Kadzere (8 Goals)
- Best player(s): (South Africa) Sinazo Ntshota
- Best goalkeeper: (South Africa) Casey Gordon
- Fair play award: Zambia

The 2022 COSAFA U-17 Women's Championship was the 4th edition of the COSAFA U-17 Women's Championship an international association football competition for women's under-17 national teams organized by Council of Southern Africa Football Associations (COSAFA). The tournament took place in Lilongwe, Malawi from 1 to 11 December 2022.

Zambia was the defending champion having defeated Botswana four to nil in the final on 6 December 2021.

South Africa won their maiden title after beating Zambia four goals to three. Malawi, the hosts, clinched the bronze medal after crashing Botswana nine goals to nil on third-place match.

== Participating nations ==
Six teams from the COSAFA region entered the tournament, originally Mauritius entered the tournament and were drawn in group A, however they withdrew before the tournament started, which saw Namibia taking their place. Malawi participated for the first time in the COSAFA U-17 Women's Championship history.

Team	App	Last	Best placement in the tournament
Botswana	3rd	2021	Runners-up (2021)
Comoros	3rd	2020	Group Stage (2019, 2020)
Malawi	1st	—	—
Namibia	2nd	2021	Group Stage (2021)
South Africa	3rd	2020	Runners-up (2019)
Zambia	4th	2021	Champions (2021)

== Venue ==
All matches were played at these ground in Malawi.

Lilongwe	2022 COSAFA U-17 Women's Championship (Malawi)
Bingu National Stadium	2022 COSAFA U-17 Women's Championship (Malawi)
Capacity: 41,100	2022 COSAFA U-17 Women's Championship (Malawi)

== Draw ==
The draw for the tournament were held on 4 November 2022 at Lilongwe, Malawi. The six teams were divided into two group. Top two teams from each group will enter to the Semi-finals

== Group summary ==
Group A	Group B
Malawi; Namibia; South Africa	Botswana; Comoros; Zambia

== Group stages ==
=== Group A ===
Pos	Team	Pld	W	D	L	GF	GA	GD	Pts	Qualification
1	South Africa	2	2	0	0	16	1	+15	6	Advance to Semi-finals
2	Malawi (H)	2	1	0	1	13	4	+9	3	Advance to Semi-finals
3	Namibia	2	0	0	2	0	24	−24	0	

Source: COSAFA
(H) Hosts
1 December 2022
13:00

Malawi	1–4	South Africa
Mbalangwe 66'	[ Report]	Mibe 14', 38'; Mdelwa 41'; Mogano 84'

Bingu National Stadium, Lilongwe
3 December 2022
13:00

Namibia	0–12	South Africa
	[ Report]	Motshegwe 2'; Ntshota 4'; Phahla 13'; Sosibo 31', 65'; Mdelwa 32', 48'; Mibe 43', 46'; Gonçalves 71'; Correia 81'; Nkosi 90'

Bingu National Stadium, Lilongwe
5 December 2022
13:00

Malawi	12–0	Namibia
Kadzere 23', 50', 55', 59', 65'; Chinzimu 49', 58', 63', 82'; Mgodi 53'; Chinyamula 79'; Baziliyo 84'	[ Report]

Bingu National Stadium, Lilongwe

=== Group B ===
Pos	Team	Pld	W	D	L	GF	GA	GD	Pts	Qualification
1	Zambia	2	2	0	0	15	0	+15	6	Advance to Semi-finals
2	Botswana	2	1	0	1	8	5	+3	3	Advance to Semi-finals
3	Comoros	2	0	0	2	0	18	−18	0	

Source: COSAFA
1 December 2022
10:00

Zambia	5–0	Botswana
Chileshe 20', 72'; Z. Zulu 22'; Matipa 60'; J. Zulu 90'	[ Report]

Bingu National Stadium, Lilongwe
3 December 2022
10:00

Botswana	8–0	Comoros
Ebineng 8', 44', 87'; Ditsile 34', 55'; Hangara 41'; Mokopakgosi 42'; Dilelo 89'	[ Report]

Bingu National Stadium, Lilongwe
5 December 2022
10:00

Zambia	10–0	Comoros
Pumulo 3', 62' (pen.), 65' (pen.); B. Zulu 17'; Musialela 26'; J. Zulu 33'; Matipa 56', 80', 89'; Mabamba 78'	[ Report]

Bingu National Stadium, Lilongwe

== Knockout stage ==
- In the knockout stage, extra-time and a penalty shoot-out will be used to decide the winner if necessary.

=== Bracket ===
Semi-finals
7 December — Lilongwe
Zambia	2 (3)
Malawi	2 (1)
8 December — Lilongwe
South Africa	3
Botswana	0

Final
11 December — Lilongwe
Zambia	3
South Africa	4
Third Place match
10 December — Lilongwe
Malawi	9
Botswana	0

=== Semi-finals ===
7 December 2022
8:30

Zambia	2–2	Malawi
J. Zulu 3' (pen.); Z. Zulu 63'	Report	Kadzere 52', 76'
Penalties
J. Zulu (penalty scored); Z. Zulu (penalty scored); Musatila (penalty missed); Chileshe (penalty scored)	3–1	(penalty missed) Chinzimu; (penalty scored) Kadzere; (penalty missed) Chinyamula; (penalty missed) Mulimbika

Bingu National Stadium, Lilongwe
Referee: Njaka Raharimanantaoa (Madagascar)
8 December 2022
18:30

South Africa	3–0	Botswana
Mdelwa 25', 63'; Ntshota 82'	Report

Bingu National Stadium, Lilongwe

=== Third place match ===
10 December 2022
18:30

Malawi	9–0	Botswana
Manda 2'; Chinyamula 13', 31'; Chinzimu 24', 40', 46'; Kadzere 33'; Mulimbika 62', 70'	[ Report]

Bingu National Stadium, Lilongwe

=== Final ===
11 December 2022
18:30

Zambia	3–4	South Africa
Kajiya 16'; J. Zulu 21'; Z. Zulu 50'	[ Report]	Ntshota 2', 66'; Mdelwa 30'; Mibe 84'

Bingu National Stadium, Lilongwe

== Awards ==
4th COSAFA Under-17 Womens Championship 2022
Winners
South Africa
First Title

== Goalscorers ==
There were 75 goals scored in 10 matches, for an average of 7.5 goals per match.

8 goals

- (Malawi) Rose Kadzere

7 goals

- (Malawi) Faith Chinzimu

6 goals

- (South Africa) Nobahle Mdelwa

5 goals

- (South Africa) Adrielle Mibe

4 goals

- (South Africa) Sinazo Ntshota
- (Zambia) Harriet Matipa
- (Zambia) Jessy Zulu

3 goals

- (Botswana) Lotang Ebineng
- (Malawi) Leticia Chinyamula
- (Zambia) Lubasi Pumulo
- (Zambia) Zangose Zulu

2 goals

- (Botswana) Katlou Ditsile
- (Malawi) Sarah Mulimbika
- (South Africa) Olwethu Sosibo
- (Zambia) Bwalya Chileshe

1 goal

- (Botswana) Mbapeua Hangara
- (Botswana) Palesa Mokopakgosi
- (Botswana) Lebogang Dilelo
- (Malawi) Mary Mbalangwe
- (Malawi) Chikondi Mgodi
- (Malawi) Anna Baziliyo
- (Malawi) Linda Manda
- (South Africa) Gositang Motshegwe
- (South Africa) Julia Gonçalves
- (South Africa) Khutso Mogano
- (South Africa) Naledi Nkosi
- (South Africa) Ntando Phahla
- (South Africa) Tatiana Correia
- (Zambia) Blessing Zulu
- (Zambia) Esther Musialela
- (Zambia) Tricia Mabamba
- (Zambia) Lucy Kajiya
