= Nobahle Mdelwa =

South African soccer player

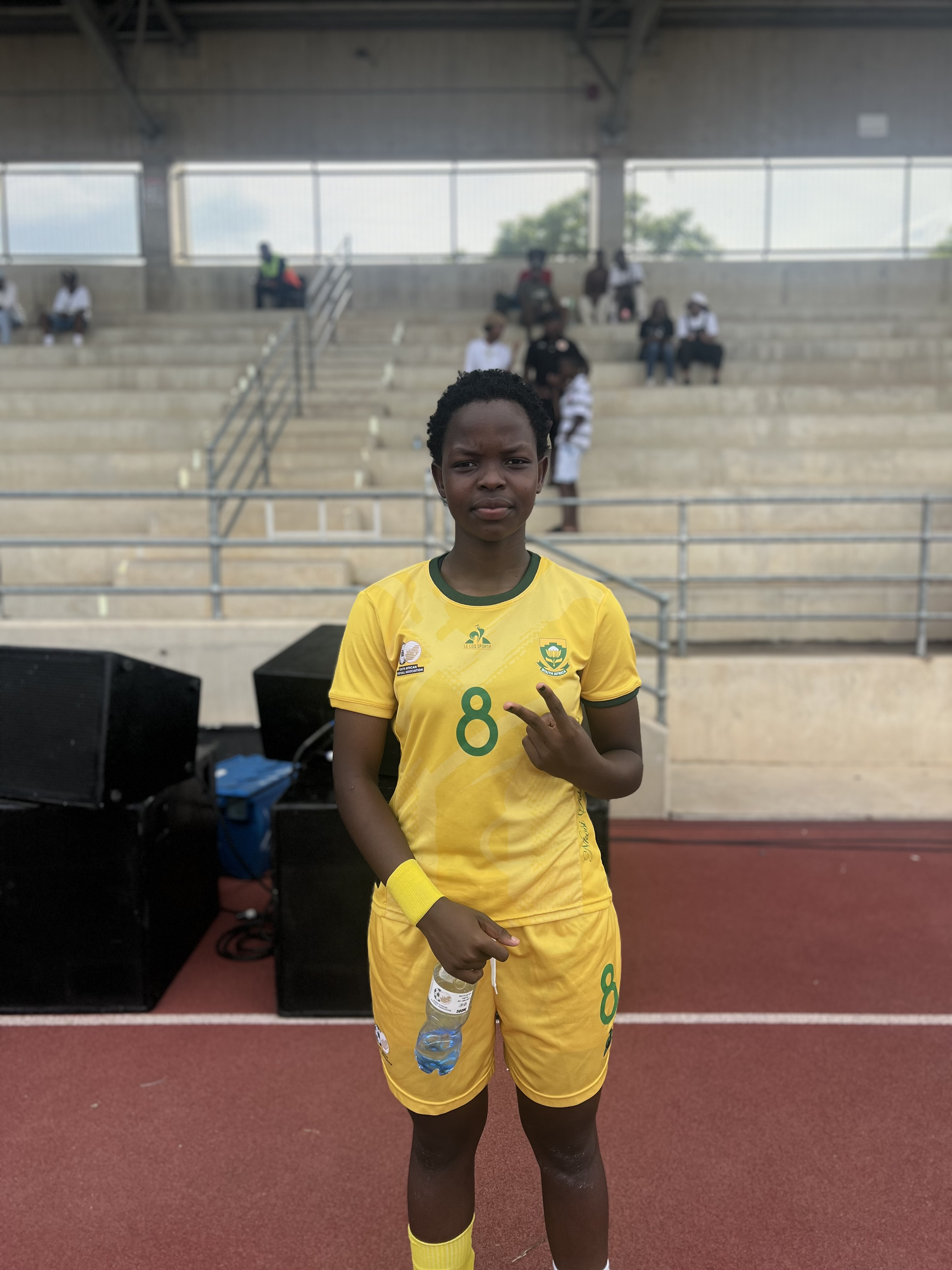
- Mdelwa in 2025

Personal information
- Date of birth: 26 June 2008 (age 18)
- Place of birth: Pietermaritzburg, South Africa
- Position: Forward

Team information
- Current team: University of Johannesburg
- Number: 10

Youth career
- -2024: Dlala Ntombazane
- 2024: Lindelani Ladies
- 2025-: University of Johannesburg

International career^{‡}
Years	Team	Apps	(Gls)
2022	South Africa U/15	5	(7)
2024-	South Africa U/17	5	(6)
2024-	South Africa U/20	4	(1)
2024-	South Africa	1	(2)
Medal record
Representing South Africa
COSAFA Women's Championship
Silver medal – second place	2024 South Africa
COSAFA U-20 Women's Championship
Silver medal – second place	2024 South Africa
COSAFA U-17 Women's Championship
Gold medal – first place	2022 Malawi
COSAFA Schools Cup
Gold medal – first place	2022 Malawi
- ‡ National team caps and goals as of 24 November 2024

Nobahle Mdelwa (born 26 June 2008) is a South African soccer player who plays as a forward for SAFA Women's League club Lindelani Ladies and the South Africa women's national team.

In 2024 she became the first player to represent South Africa at under-17, under-20, and senior level in a calendar year.

== Personal life ==
She attended Edendale Technical High. In 2023 she was awarded a scholarship to the LaLiga Academy in Madrid, Spain.

== Youth international career ==
Mdelwa competed for the South Africa women's under-15 at the 2022 COSAFA Schools Cup. She was the top goal scorer after scoring 7 goals.

She was selected for the South Africa women's under-17 team for the 2022 COSAFA U-17 Women's Championship. She scored 6 goals in the tournament to help the team to their maiden COSAFA title.

She competed for the South Africa women's under-20 team at the 2024 COSAFA U-20 Women's Championship. She scored 1 goal in 4 appearances and was player of the match twice to help the team to a runners-up position.

== International career ==
Mdelwa competed for the senior women's national team at the 2024 COSAFA Women's Championship. She made her debut against Namibia on 22 October 2024.

=== International goals ===
No.	Date	Venue	Opponent	Score	Result	Competition
1.	25 October 2024	Isaac Wolfson Stadium, Ibhayi, South Africa	Eswatini	1–0	3–0	2024 COSAFA Women's Championship
2.	23 February 2025	UJ Soweto Stadium, Johannesburg, South Africa	Lesotho	1–0	1–0	Friendly

== Honours ==
- COSAFA Women's Championship: Runners-Up: 2024
- COSAFA U-20 Women's Championship: Runners-Up: 2024
- COSAFA U-17 Women's Championship: 2022
- COSAFA Schools Cup: 2022

Individual

- COSAFA Schools Cup: Top goal scorer: 2022
