= Jessica Wade =

Jessica Wade may refer to:

- Jess Wade, British physicist
- Jessica Wade (footballer), South African soccer player
