= 2021 COSAFA Women's U-17 Championship =

2021 COSAFA U-17 Women's Championship
Tournament details
- Host country: Lesotho
- Dates: 2-6 December 2021
- Teams: 3 (from 1 confederation)
- Venue(s): 1 (in 1 host city)

Final positions
- Champions: Zambia (1st title)
- Runners-up: Botswana
- Third place: Namibia

Tournament statistics
- Matches played: 4
- Goals scored: 13 (3.25 per match)
- Top scorer(s): (Zambia) Lucy Kajiya
- Best player(s): (Zambia) Pumulo Lubasi
- Best goalkeeper: (Zambia) Chitete Munsaka
- Fair play award: Botswana

The 2021 COSAFA U-17 Women's Championship was a part of the Region 5 Games Maseru 2020, and was the third edition of the COSAFA U-17 Women's Championship. The tournament took place in Setsoto Stadium in Maseru, Lesotho on December 2–6.

== Participants ==
The championship was played by players born 2007-2005. All 14 COSAFA nation's U17 teams as well as Reunion were allowed to enter the tournament, out of which three finally participated.

- Botswana
- Namibia
- Zambia

== Group stage ==
The group stage was played in a round-robin where all 3 teams played once against each other and where the top two teams advanced to the final.

Pos	Team	Pld	W	D	L	GF	GA	GD	Pts	Qualification
1	Zambia	2	2	0	0	5	1	+4	6	Advance to the final
2	Botswana	2	1	0	1	3	4	−1	3	Advance to the final
3	Namibia	2	0	0	2	1	4	−3	0	

Source: COSAFA
2 December 2021
13.00

Zambia	3–1	Botswana
Kajiya 49', 90'; J. Zulu 83'	Report	Modisenyane 29'

Setsoto Stadium
5 December 2021
10.00

Namibia	0–2	Zambia
	Report	Z. Zulu 11'; Tailoshi 33'

Setsoto Stadium
6 December 2021
10.00

Botswana	2–1	Namibia
Tiro 10'; Hangara 42'	Report	Somses 56'

Setsoto Stadium

== Final ==
6 December 2021
17.00

Zambia	4–0	Botswana
J. Zulu 13'; Kajiya 39'; Lubasi 69'; Tailoshi 71'	Report

Setsoto Stadium

== Top Scorers ==
Representing	Player	Goals
Zambia	Lucy Kajiya	3
Zambia	Gracious Tailoshi	2
Zambia	Jessy Zulu	2

== COSAFA-La Liga partnership ==
For the second time, COSAFA awarded players for a football experience in Spain. This time Zambia's Pumulo Lubasi where selected to be traveling to Spain after awarded player of the tournament, for a LaLiga development experience, where they will get the opportunity to observe the football life in Spain and train with a local team.

== Changes due to COVID-19 ==
Many changes had to be done because of the COVID-19 pandemic and travel difficulties because of it, with many teams withdrawals.
