= 2019 COSAFA U-17 Women's Championship =

2019 COSAFA Women's U17 Championship
Tournament details
- Host country: Mauritius
- Dates: 20–29 September 2019
- Teams: 8 (from 1 confederation)
- Venue(s): 2 (in 2 host cities)

Final positions
- Champions: Uganda (1st title)
- Runners-up: South Africa
- Third place: Zambia
- Fourth place: Botswana

Tournament statistics
- Matches played: 16
- Goals scored: 158 (9.88 per match)
- Top scorer(s): (Uganda) Juliet Nalukenge
- Best player(s): (South Africa) Jessica Wade
- Best goalkeeper: (Uganda) Daphine Nyayenga

2019 COSAFA Women's U17 Championship was the first edition of COSAFA U-17 Women's Championship and took place on September 20–29, 2019, in Mauritius. Guest nation Uganda become champions after winning 2-1 in the final to South Africa.

== Participants ==
All the 14 COSAFA nations U17 teams along with Réunion were eligible for the tournament, and 7 took part. For this tournament CECAFA member Uganda was also invited.

- Botswana
- Comoros
- Madagascar
- Mauritius (host)
- Seychelles
- South Africa
- Uganda (guest)
- Zambia

== Venues ==
Groups A, B, Semifinals and Final	Groups A and B	Host locations in Mauritius.
Port Louis	Belle Vue Harel	Host locations in Mauritius.
St. François Xavier Stadium	Anjalay Stadium	Host locations in Mauritius.
Capacity: 2,500	Capacity: 16,000	Host locations in Mauritius.
14 games	2 games	Host locations in Mauritius.

== Group stage ==
The teams were drawn into two groups of four out of which two advanced to the semi-finals from each group.

=== Group A ===
Pos	Team	Pld	W	D	L	GF	GA	GD	Pts	Qualification
1	Uganda	3	2	1	0	32	1	+31	7	Advance to knockout stage
2	Zambia	3	2	1	0	24	1	+23	7	Advance to knockout stage
3	Mauritius (H)	3	1	0	2	5	20	−15	3	
4	Comoros	3	0	0	3	1	40	−39	0	

Source: COSAFA.com
(H) Hosts
20 September 2019
12:30

Uganda	1–1	Zambia
Nalukenge 62' (pen.)	Report	Masumo 84'

St. François Xavier Stadium, Port Louis
20 September 2019
15:30

Mauritius	5–1	Comoros
Pierrot 3'; Ramasawmy 14', 65'; Verloppe 84'; Quirin 87'	Report	M. Ali 10'

St. François Xavier Stadium, Port Louis

22 September 2019
12:30

Comoros	0–15	Zambia
	Report	Masumo 3', 8' (pen.), 66'; Kasonde 17', 18', 28', 52'; Maenfou 27' (o.g.); C. Banda 29', 45', 55'; Chilenga 32'; T. Lungu 34', 75'; E. Banda 62'

St. François Xavier Stadium, Port Louis
22 September 2019
15:30

Uganda	11–0	Mauritius
Kunihira 1'; Nalukenge 5', 35', 49', 51', 61', 74'; Musibika 14'; Najjemba 28', 66'; Nyayenga 54' (pen.)	Report

St. François Xavier Stadium, Port Louis

24 September 2019
15:00

Comoros	0–20	Uganda
	Report	Kunihira 2', 3', 22', 25', 61'; Nalukenge 10' (pen.), 19', 26', 31', 34', 54', 90' (pen.); Nyinagahirwa 31', 38', 44'; Akadinda 45'; Najjemba 45', 77', 79', 84'

Anjalay Stadium, Belle Vue Harel
24 September 2019
15:00

Zambia	8–0	Mauritius
Kasonde 7', 64', 81' (pen.); T. Lungu 25'; Chilenga 41'; C. Banda 44'; Selemani 85', 86'	Report

St. François Xavier Stadium, Port Louis

=== Group B ===
Pos	Team	Pld	W	D	L	GF	GA	GD	Pts	Qualification
1	South Africa	3	3	0	0	36	2	+34	9	Advance to knockout stage
2	Botswana	3	2	0	1	21	6	+15	6	Advance to knockout stage
3	Madagascar	3	1	0	2	17	9	+8	3	
4	Seychelles	3	0	0	3	1	58	−57	0	

Source: COSAFA.com
21 September 2019
12:30

Botswana	6–0	Madagascar
Modisenyane 19'; Modise 28', 79'; Monyatsi 58', 89'; Rantsho 88'	Report

St. François Xavier Stadium, Port Louis
21 September 2019
15:30

Seychelles	0–28	South Africa
	Report	Marhasi 2', 21', 22', 27', 39', 43'; Wade 5' (pen.), 12', 18'; Gamede 19'; Carollissen 30', 40'; Mzingeli 31', 44', 64'; Galant 45+1', 46', 74'; Kortjie 47', 60', 66', 71', 72', 77'; O'Malley 55'; Noble 75'; Philisani 85'; Ndluli 89'

St. François Xavier Stadium, Port Louis

23 September 2019
12:30

Madagascar	16–0	Seychelles
Razanajohary 6', 24', 47'; Raveloarisoa 9', 37'; Lalasoa 12', 42', 55', 63', 81', 87'; Randriamialimanantsoa 33', 90'; Rondromalala 60'; Raheriarisoa 70'; Aniera 86'	Report

St. François Xavier Stadium, Port Louis
23 September 2019
15:30

South Africa	5–1	Botswana
Marhasi 2', 59'; Wade 29'; Carollissen 48'; Noble 90'	Report	Sikwane 38'

St. François Xavier Stadium, Port Louis

25 September 2019
15:00

Seychelles	1–14	Botswana
Chan-Tak-Hue 18'	Report	Sikwane 1', 45', 65', 75', 84'; Motlogelwa 10', 90'; Mbongwe 17'; Rantsho 20', 28', 37' (pen.), 55', 61'; Gabana 85'

Anjalay Stadium, Belle Vue Harel
25 September 2019
15:00

Madagascar	1–3	South Africa
Raveloarisoa 79' (pen.)	Report	Gamede 22', 30' (pen.); Marhasi 66'

St. François Xavier Stadium, Port Louis

== Knockout stage ==
=== Bracket ===
Semi-finals
27 September — Port Louis
Uganda	12
Botswana	0
27 September — Port Louis
South Africa	2
Zambia	1

Final
29 September — Port Louis
Uganda	2
South Africa	1
Third Place match
29 September — Port Louis
Botswana	0
Zambia	3

=== Semi-finals ===
27 September 2019
12:00

Uganda	12–0	Botswana
Kunihira 6', 35', 58'; Nalukenge 14', 25', 47'; Najjemba 38', 45', 46', 62', 65', 82'	Report

St. François Xavier Stadium, Port Louis
27 September 2019
15:00

South Africa	2–1	Zambia
Marhasi 17'; Wade 49'	Report	Chilenga 28'

St. François Xavier Stadium, Port Louis

=== Bronze medal game ===
29 September 2019
11:00

Botswana	0–3	Zambia
	Report	Nsama 27'; Masumo 63'; Chilenga 86'

St. François Xavier Stadium, Port Louis

=== Final ===
29 September 2019
15:00

Uganda	2–1	South Africa
Najjemba 56'; Nalukenge 86'	Report	Kortjie 74'

St. François Xavier Stadium, Port Louis

== Goalscorers ==
There were 158 goals scored in 16 matches, for an average of 9.88 goals per match.

18 goals

- (Uganda) Juliet Nalukenge

13 goals

- (Uganda) Fauzia Najjemba

10 goals

- (South Africa) Oyisa Marhasi

9 goals

- (Uganda) Margret Kunihira

7 goals

- (South Africa) Tiffany Kortjie
- (Zambia) Florence Kasonde

6 goals

- (Botswana) Bofelo Rantsho
- (Madagascar) Alinah Lalasoa

5 goals

- (Botswana) Pearl Sikwane
- (South Africa) Jessica Wade
- (Zambia) Shelly Masumo

4 goals

- (Zambia) Cindy Banda
- (Zambia) Maweta Chilenga

3 goals

- (Madagascar) Lydia Razanajohary
- (Madagascar) Marie Raveloarisoa
- (South Africa) Tiyana Carollissen
- (South Africa) Nabeelah Galant
- (South Africa) Sonika Mzingeli
- (South Africa) Nelly Gamede
- (Uganda) Shakira Nyinagahirwa
- (Zambia) Tisilile Lungu

2 goals

- (Botswana) Yaone Modise
- (Botswana) Christinah Monyatsi
- (Botswana) Lorato Motlogelwa
- (Madagascar) Jenny Randriamialimanantsoa
- (Mauritius) Jerusha Ramasawmy
- (South Africa) Sonika Mzingeli
- (South Africa) Christy Noble
- (Zambia) Comfort Selemani

1 goal

- (Botswana) Tlhompho Gabana
- (Botswana) Kaone Mbongwe
- (Botswana) Serati Modisenyane
- (Comoros) Moinahedji Ali
- (Madagascar) Iloala Aniera
- (Madagascar) Laurencia Raheriarisoa
- (Madagascar) Charline Rondromalala
- (Mauritius) Marie Quirin
- (Mauritius) Marie Verloppe
- (Seychelles) Kimbelly Chan-Tak-Hue
- (South Africa) Yolanda Ndluli
- (South Africa) Shakira O'Malley
- (South Africa) Hlela Philisani
- (Uganda) Stella Musibika
- (Uganda) Daphine Nyayenga
- (Uganda) Gillian Akadinda
- (Zambia) Esther Banda
- (Zambia) Precious Nsama

1 own goal

- (Comoros) Soukaina Maenfou (Against Zambia)
