= Leticia Chinyamula =

Malawian footballer (born 2006)

Personal information
- Date of birth: 12 June 2006 (age 20)
- Place of birth: Malawi
- Position: Midfielder

Team information
- Current team: Ascent Academy

Senior career*
Years	Team	Apps	(Gls)
2022–	Ascent Academy		

International career^{‡}
2022	Malawi U17	4	(3)
2023–	Malawi	7	(7)
Medal record
Women's Africa Cup of Nations
Silver medal – second place	2026 Morocco
- * Club domestic league appearances and goals ‡ National team caps and goals as of 29 October 2024

Leticia Chinyamula (born 12 June 2006) is a Malawian footballer who plays as a midfielder for Ascent Academy and captains the Malawi national (junior) team. In 2026 she led Malawi's under 20s national team to qualify for the 2027 FIFA Women's Under-20 World Cup African Qualifiers. The only team from the COSAFA area.

== Club career ==
Chinyamula has been playing for Ascent Academy. and participated with them in the 2024 COSAFA Women'Champions League.

In February 2025 at the first Football Association Malawi awards she was named 2024 woman player of the year and she won 3m kwacha.

== International career ==
Chinyamula is a Malawian youth and senior international. She was named to Malawi's maiden under-17 team to represent the nation on the international stage at the 2022 COSAFA U-17 Women's Championship, played on home soil. In April 2024, she was nominated for the COSAFA Women's Most Promising Player Award, which she went on to win in May 2024.

In September 2023, she received her first call-up to the senior team for the 2023 COSAFA Women's Championship. On 25 September 2023 she scored her debut international goals, a brace in a historic 17–0 victory against Seychelles. She and the team went on to secure the championship, marking Malawi's first women's trophy. in the 2024 edition She was named in the group stage best 11.

By 2026 she was the captain of the "Junior Scorchers" (Malawi's under 20s national) team and they were the only team from the COSAFA area who qualified for the 2027 FIFA Women's Under-20 World Cup African Qualifiers. This was achieved after their third round win 6:2 over Guinea- Bassau.

She was in Lovemore Fazili's squad who went to Morocco in August 2026. They beat Algeria to qualify for the final. She came on as a substitute with Vanessa Chikupila to replace Asimenye Simwaka and Chikondi Gondwe. By that point both sides were down to ten players but Malawi won the match 3–1.

== Career statistics ==
=== International ===
As of match played 28 October 2024

Appearances and goals by national team and year
National team	Year	Apps	Goals
Malawi	2023	4	4
Malawi	2024	3	3
Total		7	7

Scores and results list Malawi's goal tally first, score column indicates score after each Chinyamula goal.

List of international goals scored by Leticia Chinyamula
No.	Date	Location	Opponent	Score	Result	Competition	Ref.
1	25 September 2023	Blantyre, Malawi	Seychelles	10–0	17–0	International Friendly	
2	25 September 2023	Blantyre, Malawi	Seychelles	16–0	17–0	International Friendly	
3	4 October 2023	Pretoria, South Africa	South Africa	1–0	4–3	2023 COSAFA Women's Championship	
4	12 October 2023	Johannesburg, South Africa	Madagascar	2–0	3–1	2023 COSAFA Women's Championship	
5	28 October 2024	Gqeberha, South Africa	Mauritius	1–0	9–0	2024 COSAFA Women's Championship	
6	28 October 2024	Gqeberha, South Africa	Mauritius	4–0	9–0	2024 COSAFA Women's Championship	
7	28 October 2024	Gqeberha, South Africa	Mauritius	6–0	9–0	2024 COSAFA Women's Championship	

== Honors ==
Malawi

- COSAFA Women's Championship: 2023

=== Individual ===
Malawi Women's Player of the Year: 2024
