= COSAFA U-17 Women's Championship =

Football tournament in Southern Africa

- Founded: 2019
- Region: Southern Africa (COSAFA)
- Teams: 14 (Maximum)
- Current champions: Zambia (3rd title)
- Most championships: Zambia (3 titles)
- Website: cosafa.com
- 2025 COSAFA U-17 Girls' Championship

The COSAFA Women's U17 Championship is an annual football tournament for women's under-17 teams from Southern Africa organized by the Council of Southern Africa Football Associations (COSAFA). The tournament was introduced to develop the woman's game and strengthen the region's nation's competitiveness in the continental qualifiers. Invited from CECAFA, Uganda become the first champions after beating South Africa in the inaugural 2019 final in Mauritius. Even the second edition was won by a CECAFA representant, this time Tanzania won over Zambia in the final.

== Results ==
Ed.	Year	Host	Final			Third place game / Losing Semi-finalists			Num. teams
Ed.	Year	Host	(gold) Champions	Score	(silver) Runners-up	(bronze) Third place	Score	Fourth place	Num. teams
1	2019	(Mauritius) Port Louis	Uganda^{[G]}	2–1	South Africa	Zambia	3–0	Botswana	8
2	2020	(South Africa) Port Elizabeth	Tanzania^{[G]}	1–1 (4–3 p)	Zambia	South Africa	Round-robin	Zimbabwe	5
3	2021	(Lesotho) Maseru	Zambia	4–0	Botswana	Namibia			3
4	2022	(Malawi) Lilongwe	South Africa	4–3	Zambia	Malawi	9–0	Botswana	6
5	2024	(South Africa) Johannesburg	Zambia	15–0	Lesotho	Madagascar and Mozambique			12
6	2025	(Namibia) Windhoek	Zambia	3–0	Malawi	Mozambique	3–2	Zimbabwe	9

Guest team (G): An invited guest team, not a member of COSAFA.

== Awards ==
Tournament	Best player	Top scorer	Goals	Best goalkeeper	Fair Play Award
Mauritius 2019	(South Africa) Jessica Wade	(Uganda) Juliet Nalukenge	18	(Uganda) Daphine Nyayenga	Botswana
South Africa 2020	(Zambia) Tisilile Lungu	(Tanzania) Aisha Masaka	10	(Zambia) Chitete Munsaka	Zambia
Lesotho 2021	(Zambia) Lubasi Pumulo	(Zambia) Lucy Kajiya	3	(Zambia) Chitete Munsaka	Botswana
Malawi 2022	(South Africa) Sinazo Ntshota	(Malawi) Rose Kadzere	8	(South Africa) Casey Gordon	Zambia
South Africa 2024	(Zambia) Mercy Chipasula	(Zambia) Mercy Chipasula	13	(Zambia) Loveness Chingwele	Lesotho
Namibia 2025	(Zambia) Ruth Mukoma	(Namibia) Nancy Lebang	7	(Zambia) Bukata Kakumbi	Malawi

=== All time goal scorers ===
Active players in bold, statistics correct as of November 2024.

Rank	Player	Goals
1	(Uganda) Juliet Nalukenge	**18**
2	(Zambia) Mercy Chipasula	13
2	(Uganda) Fauzia Najjemba	13
3	(South Africa) Oyisa Marhasi	11
4	(South Africa) Jessica Wade (footballer)	10
4	(Tanzania) Aisha Masaka	10
