= Elizabeth Oppong =

Ghanaian footballer (born 2003)

Personal information
- Date of birth: 15 May 2003 (age 23)
- Place of birth: Ghana
- Height: 1.60 m (5 ft 3 in)
- Position: Midfielder

Team information
- Current team: Hakkarigücü
- Number: 5

Senior career*
Years	Team	Apps	(Gls)
–2021	Thunder Queens		
2021–2025	Apollon Ladies		
2025–	Hakkarigücü	20	(2)

International career
2018–2020	Ghana U-17		
2022	Ghana U-20		
- * Club domestic league appearances and goals as of 3 April 2026

Elizabeth Oppong (born 15 May 2003) is a Ghanaian professional women's football midfielder who plays in the Turkish Super League for Hakkarigücü. She was part of the Ghana national U-17 and U-20 teams.

== Club career ==
Oppong is 1.60 m (5 ft 3 in) tall, and plays in the offensive midfielder position.

She played for the top-flight club Thunder Queens in Accra until the end of the 2020–21 Ghana Women's Premier League. During her time in the team, she won three "NASCO Electronics Player of the match" awards.

Mid August 2021, she went to Cyprus, and signed a three-year deal, which is subject to renewal every year, with the First Division League club Apollon Ladies, also called as Apollon Limassol. She took part at the UEFA Women's Champions League qualifying rounds, and at the 2024–25 tournament, she scored a goal against Pyunik of Armeni. For Apollon Ladies, she last played in the 2024–25 Cypriot league season.

In September 2025, she moved to Turkey, and joined the Super League club Hakkari.

== International career ==
Oppong was part of the Ghana national U-17 team, nicknamed "Black Maidens", at the 2018 FIFA U-17 Women's World Cup in Uruguay. She played at the 2020 African U-17 Women's World Cup qualification matches, and scored a goal in the second leg game against Liberia.

In 2022, she was named for the Ghana women's national under-20 football team, (also known as the "Black Princesses" to play at the 2022 African U-20 Women's World Cup qualification.

== Personal life ==
Elizabeth Oppong was born on 15 May 2003.
