= Zimbabwe women's national under-17 football team =

National U-17 association football team

Zimbabwe under-17
- Nickname: Young Mighty Warriors
- Association: Zimbabwe Football Association
- Confederation: CAF
- Sub-confederation: COSAFA
- Head coach: Annie Konje
- Top scorer: Chiedza Khumalo (2 goals)

First international
- South Africa 7-0 Zimbabwe (Johannesburg, South Africa; 6 November 2020)

Biggest win
- Zimbabwe 2-1 Mauritius (Johannesburg, South Africa; 5 December 2024)

Biggest defeat
- Tanzania 10-1 Zimbabwe (Johannesburg, South Africa; 10 November 2020)

COSAFA U-17 Women's Championship
- Appearances: 2 (first in 2020)
- Best result: Group Stage (2020), (2024)

The Zimbabwe women's national under-17 football team (Young Mighty Warriors), is a youth football team, which represents Zimbabwe and is controlled by the Zimbabwe Football Association, the governing body for football in Zimbabwe. The team's main objective is to qualify and play at the FIFA U-17 Women's World Cup and develop players for the main national team Mighty Warriors.

== History ==
The team made their COSAFA U-17 Girls' Championship debut in 2020. The team withdrew from the World Cup qualifiers against Ethiopia in 2025.

== Results and fixtures ==
The following is a list of match results in the last 12 months, as well as any future matches that have been scheduled.

Legend

Win Draw Loss Fixture
