= 2020 COSAFA Women's U17 Championship =

2020 COSAFA U-17 Women's Championship
Tournament details
- Host country: South Africa
- Dates: 4–14 November 2020
- Teams: 5 (from 1 confederation)
- Venues: 2 (in 1 host city)

Final positions
- Champions: Tanzania (1stth title)
- Runners-up: Zambia
- Third place: South Africa
- Fourth place: Zimbabwe

Tournament statistics
- Matches played: 11
- Goals scored: 63 (5.73 per match)
- Top scorer: (Tanzania) Aisha Masaka
- Best player: (Zambia) Tisilile Lungu
- Best goalkeeper: (Zambia) Chitete Munsaka
- Fair play award: Zambia

The 2020 COSAFA U-17 Women's Championship was the second edition of the COSAFA U-17 Women's Championship. The tournament took place in Nelson Mandela Bay, South Africa on November 4–14.

== Participants ==
All 14 COSAFA nation's U17 teams as well as Reunion were allowed to enter the tournament, out of which four finally participated. Tanzania was invited as a guest team for this tournament.

- Comoros
- South Africa (host)
- Tanzania (guest)
- Zambia
- Zimbabwe

== Group stage ==
The group stage is played in a round-robin where all 5 teams play once against each other and where the top two teams advance to the final.

Pos	Team	Pld	W	D	L	GF	GA	GD	Pts	Qualification
1	Zambia	4	4	0	0	12	4	+8	12	Advance to the final
2	Tanzania (G)	4	3	0	1	22	5	+17	9	Advance to the final
3	South Africa (H)	4	2	0	2	18	8	+10	6	
4	Zimbabwe	4	1	0	3	6	24	−18	3	
5	Comoros	4	0	0	4	3	20	−17	0	

Source: COSAFA.com
(G) Guests; (H) Hosts
4 November 2020
12.30

Comoros	1–5	Tanzania
Mistoihi 26' (pen.)	Report	Masaka 20', 59'; Lema 71'; Haruna 82'; Mbunda 88'

The Oval
4 November 2020
15.30

South Africa	1–2	Zambia
Galant 62'	Report	Chulu 68'; C. Banda 89'

The Oval

6 November 2020
12.30

Zambia	2–1	Tanzania
C. Banda 17'; Lungu 47'	Report	Masaka 85'

The Oval
6 November 2020
15.30

Zimbabwe	0–7	South Africa
	Report	Wade 32', 79', 90'; Leask 63'; Galant 75'; Marhasi 87'; Scott 90'

The Oval

8 November 2020
12.30

Zimbabwe	3–2	Comoros
Nyagumbo 78'; Maferefa 82'; Ndarowa 90'	Report	Mistoihi 4'; Dalila 43'

The Oval
8 November 2020
15.30

Tanzania	6–1	South Africa
Haruna 18'; Masaka 22', 30', 39', 45', 90'	Report	Mohamedi 69'

The Oval

10 November 2020
12.30

Zambia	3–0	Comoros
Selemani 17'; Lungu 44'; B. Banda 61'	Report

The Oval
10 November 2020
15.30

Tanzania	10–1	Zimbabwe
Mbunda 1'; Kipanga 8'; Kisisa 13'; Mohamedi 19', 89'; Gindulya 31'; Athuman 55'; Shibara 71', 87'; Masaka 83'	Report	Machadu 78'

The Oval

12 November 2020
12.30

South Africa	9–0	Comoros
Wade 24' (pen.), 37'; Mpehle 38'; Galant 44', 50'; Taiwe 54' (pen.), 83'; Leask 56', 90'	Report

The Oval
12 November 2020
15.30

Zambia	5–2	Zimbabwe
Lungu 12', 78', 85'; Chulu 13'; Sambo 45'	Report	Machadu 58'; Maferefa 59'

The Oval

== Final ==
14 November 2020
12.00

Zambia	1–1	Tanzania
Selemani 18'	Report	Masaka 90' (pen.)
Penalties
	3–4

Nelson Mandela Bay Stadium

== Top Scorers ==
Representing	Player	Goals
Tanzania	Aisha Masaka	10
South Africa	Jessica Wade	5
Zambia	Tisilile Lungu	5

== COSAFA-La Liga partnership ==
South Africa's Jessica Wade (also awarded best player of last years tournament) and Zambia's Tisilile Lungu(also scored 3 goals at last years tournament) was selected by the Technical Study Group to be traveling to Spain for a LaLiga development experience, where they will get the opportunity to observe the football life in Spain and train with a local team. The duo become the first players to get this opportunity on account of the new formalization of the partnership between COSAFA and La Liga to boost Southern African football.

== Changes due to COVID-19 ==
The tournament was originally planned to be played in Mauritius on April 17–26, with 8 participating nations, but in March COSAFA decided to postpone. Other than the four COSAFA nations finally participating, Mauritius, Botswana, Eswatini, and Malawi was set to play the tournament. When the new plan was set for the tournament to be played in South Africa in November, Tanzania had been invited and six teams should be divided into two groups where the winners and runners-up should advance to the semi-finals. After Botswana's withdrawal, as many of their players had lost time in school and were set to write exams, the five-team group was finally employed.
