= Jessica Wade (footballer) =

South African footballer (born 2003)

Personal information
- Date of birth: 11 April 2003 (age 23)
- Place of birth: Alberton, South Africa
- Position: Midfielder

Team information
- Current team: Åland United

Youth career
- 2014–: JVW Girls

College career
Years	Team	Apps	(Gls)
–2021	University of Johannesburg		

Senior career*
Years	Team	Apps	(Gls)
2022–2023	Maccabi Haifa		
2024–2024	JVW		
2025–	Åland United		

International career
2015–2018	South Africa U17		(10)
2021–2023	South Africa U20		
2025–	South Africa	1	(0)
- * Club domestic league appearances and goals

Jessica Wade (born 11 April 2003) is a South African soccer player who plays as a midfielder for Kansallinen Liiga club Åland United and the South Africa women's national team.

She was named the inaugural SAFA Women's League midfielder of the season at the 2025 awards.

== Club career ==
=== JVW ===
Wade joined JVW Girls Academy as an 11-year old. By age 16 she was playing in the Sasol League and was part of the squad that lifted the 2019 Sasol League title.

=== University of Johannesburg ===
Wade played for the University of Johannesburg in 2021 before an injury ended her season prematurely.

=== Maccabi Emek Hefer ===
In June 2022 she signed with Israeli First League side Maccabi Haifa F.C..

=== JVW ===
In 2024 she re-joined the Blue Diamonds in the SAFA Women's League. She was named the 2025 SAFA Women's League midfielder of the season.

=== Åland United ===
In December 2025 she signed with Kansallinen Liiga club Åland United on a two year deal.

== Youth international career ==
She competed with the South Africa under-17 team at the 2018 FIFA U-17 Women's World Cup and captained the team that finished as runners-up at the 2019 COSAFA U-17 Women's Championship. She won the best player award and scored 5 goals in the tournament. She also scored 5 goals at the 2020 edition when the side finished in third.

In 2021 she competed for the South Africa under-20 team in the 2022 African U-20 Women's World Cup qualification where they were knockout out in the third round by Uganda.

== International career ==
Wade was called up for the senior women's team in a friendly match against Morocco on 2 December 2025 coming on in the 30th minute to replace captain Refiloe Jane.

== Honours ==
South Africa

- COSAFA U-17 Women's Championship: Runners-Up: 2019 Third: 2020

JVW

- Sasol League National Championship: 2019

Individual

- 2019 COSAFA U-17 Women's Championship Best Player
- 2025 SAFA Women's League Midfielder of the Season
