= Comfort Selemani =

Zambian footballer (born 2004)

Personal information
- Date of birth: 8 February 2004 (age 22)
- Position: Midfielder

Team information
- Current team: Green Buffaloes (loan)

Senior career*
Years	Team	Apps	(Gls)
20??–	Elite Ladies		
2023–	→ Green Buffaloes (loan)		

International career
- Zambia
- * Club domestic league appearances and goals

Comfort Selemani (born 8 February 2004) is a Zambian footballer who plays as a midfielder for Green Buffaloes on loan from Elite Ladies and the Zambia women's national team.

== Club career ==
On 11 August 2023, Selemani joined Green Buffaloes on a season-long loan.

== International career ==
On 3 July 2023, Selemani was named as one of the reserve players for the squad for the 2023 FIFA Women's World Cup. On 21 July, Grace Chanda withdrew from the squad due to illness and Selemani was selected to replaced her.
