= Juliet Nalukenge =

Ugandan footballer (born 2003)

Personal information
- Date of birth: 14 August 2003 (age 23)
- Place of birth: Mityana, Uganda
- Height: 1.60 m (5 ft 3 in)
- Position: Forward

Team information
- Current team: Puebla
- Number: 23

Youth career
- Kawempe Muslim LFC

Senior career*
Years	Team	Apps	(Gls)
2015–2021	Kawempe Muslim LFC		
2021–2024	Apollon		
2025–2026	Atlas	10	(1)
2026–	Puebla	0	(0)

International career^{‡}
2018–	Uganda		
2019–2021	Uganda U-20		
2019	Uganda U-17	14	(32)
- * Club domestic league appearances and goals as of 6 February 2026 ‡ National team caps and goals as of 14:29, 3 May 2021 (UTC)

Juliet Nalukenge (born 14 August 2003) is a Ugandan footballer who plays as Forward for Liga MX Femenil club Puebla and the Uganda women's national team.

A promising forward, Nalukenge was named Ugandan Women's Player of the Year in 2019 and in March 2021 finished ninth in the Goal (website) NXGN Award for the best young female footballer in the world.

== Club career ==
Although Nalukenge is a Christian, her football skills won her a scholarship to Kawempe Muslim Secondary School. She began playing for the attached women's football team at youth level in the regional leagues, and in 2015–16 broke into the first team who play at FUFA Women Elite League level.

== International career ==
Nalukenge won her first cap for the senior Uganda women's national team on 8 April 2018, in a 2018 Africa Women Cup of Nations qualification first round fixture against Kenya.

She was later included in the Crested Cranes squad for the 2018 CECAFA Women's Championship held in Kigali, Rwanda.

Nalukenge scored her first national team goal on 17 September 2018 eight minutes after coming off the bench as Uganda beat Zimbabwe 2-1 in the final group game of the 2018 COSAFA Women's Championship in South Africa.

On 19 November 2019, Nalukenge scored five goals as Uganda earned a comprehensive 13-0 win over Djibouti in the 2019 CECAFA Women's Championship in Dar es Salaam, Tanzania.

=== International goals ===
Scores and results list Uganda goal tally first

No.	Date	Venue	Opponent	Score	Result	Competition
1	17 September 2018	Wolfson Stadium, KwaZakele, South Africa	Zimbabwe	1–0	2–1	2018 COSAFA Women's Championship
2	17 November 2019	Chamazi Stadium, Mbagala, Tanzania	Djibouti	1–0	13–0	2019 CECAFA Women's Championship
3	17 November 2019	Chamazi Stadium, Mbagala, Tanzania	Djibouti	2–0	13–0	2019 CECAFA Women's Championship
4	17 November 2019	Chamazi Stadium, Mbagala, Tanzania	Djibouti	4–0	13–0	2019 CECAFA Women's Championship
5	17 November 2019	Chamazi Stadium, Mbagala, Tanzania	Djibouti	7–0	13–0	2019 CECAFA Women's Championship
6	17 November 2019	Chamazi Stadium, Mbagala, Tanzania	Djibouti	11–0	13–0	2019 CECAFA Women's Championship

== Honours ==
Kawempe Muslim LFC

- FUFA Women Elite League (FWEL): 2015, 2015–16, 2016–17, 2017-18

Apollon Ladies FC

- Cypriot Women's First Division: 2022/23, 2023/24
- Cypriot Women's Cup: 2023
- Cypriot Women's Super Cup: 2023

1207 Antalyaspor

- Turkish Super Lig Promotional Play-Off: 2025

Uganda U17

- COSAFA U17 Women's Championship: 2019
- CECAFA U17 Women's Championship: 2019

Uganda U20

- All Africa Games (Bronze): 2023

Uganda

- CECAFA Women's Championship: 2022
- CECAFA Women's Championship (Silver): 2018
- COSAFA Women's Championship (Bronze): 2018
- CECAFA Women's Championship: (Bronze): 2019

Individual

- NXGN - Goal.com's Best Wonderkids in the World: 2021 (9th), 2022 (19th).
- IFFHS Youth Player of the Year: Nominated in Top 20 in 2023.
- IFFHS Best African Youth Team of the Year: 2023
- Uganda's Best Female Player of the Year (FUFA Awards): 2019
- Uganda Sports Press Association (USPA) Female Player of the Year: 2019
- COSAFA U17 Women's Championship Top Scorer: 2019 with 18 goals.
- All-time Top Scorer of the COSAFA U17 Women's Championship: 18 goals
- FIFA U17 Women's World Cup Qualifiers Joint Top Scorer: 2020 with five goals.
- All-time Top Scorer of the Uganda U17 National Team with 32 goals.
- Real Stars Sports Award: Player of the Month for January 2020.
