= 2013 African U-17 Women's World Cup qualification =

2013 African U-17 Women's World Cup Qualifying Tournament
Tournament details
- Teams: 10 (from 1 confederation)

Tournament statistics
- Matches played: 6
- Goals scored: 28 (4.67 per match)

The 2013 African U-17 Women's World Cup Qualifying Tournament was the 4th edition of the African U-17 Women's World Cup Qualifying Tournament, the biennial international youth football competition organised by the Confederation of African Football (CAF) to determine which women's under-17 national teams from Africa qualify for the FIFA U-17 Women's World Cup.

The tournament was played on a home and away knockout basis. 10 teams entered the competition. The pairings were released in late June 2013. The first round's many withdrawal of teams was openly criticised by FIFA.

The top three teams of the tournament Ghana, Nigeria and Zambia qualified for the 2014 FIFA U-17 Women's World Cup in Costa Rica as the CAF representatives.

== Teams ==
| Bye to second round (2 teams) | First round entrants (8 teams) |
|---|---|
| Nigeria; South Africa | Botswana; Congo; Equatorial Guinea; Ghana; Kenya; Morocco; South Sudan; Zambia |

== First round ==
The matches took place in the first week of August and September. Nigeria and South Africa received a bye this round.

| Team 1 | Agg. | Team 2 | 1st leg | 2nd leg |
|---|---|---|---|---|
| Equatorial Guinea | w/o^{1} | Kenya | — | — |
| Ghana | w/o^{2} | Congo | — | — |
| Botswana | 3–8 | Zambia | 2–5 | 1–3 |
| Morocco | w/o^{3} | South Sudan | — | — |
| Nigeria | Bye | | | |
| South Africa | Bye | | | |

- ^{1} : Kenya withdrew from the game and Equatorial Guinea moved on.
- ^{2} : Congo did not show up for the first leg. Consequently, CAF cancelled the second leg and Ghana moved on to the next round.
- ^{3} : Morocco apparently withdrew from the competition. South Sudan moved to the next round.

== Second round ==
Nigeria and South Africa were the top seeded teams and received a bye to the first round. Matches were played in November. The three winners qualified to the 2014 FIFA U-17 Women's World Cup. Nigeria due to withdrawal of South Sudan from the Competition. Ghana on a 5–2 aggregate against Equatorial Guinea. Zambia booked their world cup ticket after a 3–1 win against South Africa.

| Team 1 | Agg. | Team 2 | 1st leg | 2nd leg |
|---|---|---|---|---|
| Ghana | 5–2 | Equatorial Guinea | 2–0 | 3–2 |
| Zambia | 6–4 | South Africa | 3–3 | 3–1 |
| South Sudan | w/o^{1} | Nigeria | — | — |

- ^{1} : South Sudan withdrew from the competition and Nigeria got qualified for the 2014 FIFA U-17 Women's World Cup.
