= DR Congo women's national under-17 football team =

DR Congo women's U-17
- Association: Congolese Association Football Federation
- Confederation: CAF (Africa)
- Sub-confederation: UNIFFAC (Central Africa)
- FIFA code: COD
First colours	Second colours

African U-17 Women's World Cup qualification
- Appearances: 2 (first in 2022)
- Best result: Round 2 (2025)

FIFA U-17 Women's World Cup
- Appearances: None

DR Congo women's national under-17 football team is a youth association football team operated under the auspices of the Congolese Association Football Federation. Its primary role is the development of players in preparation for the senior DR Congo women's national football team.

== Competitive record ==
=== FIFA U-17 Women's World Cup record ===
FIFA U-17 Women's World Cup
Year	Result	Pld	W	D *	L	GF	GA
(New Zealand) 2008	Did not enter						
(Trinidad and Tobago) 2010	Did not enter						
(Azerbaijan) 2012	Did not enter						
(Costa Rica) 2014	Did not enter						
(Jordan) 2016	Did not enter						
(Uruguay) 2018	Did not enter						
(India) 2022	Did not qualify						
(Dominican Republic) 2024	Did not qualify						
(Morocco) 2025	Did not qualify						
Total	0/8						

== See also ==
- DR Congo women's national football team
- DR Congo women's national under-20 football team
