= Ethiopia women's national under-17 football team =

Ethiopia women's U-17
- Nickname: Lucy
- Association: Ethiopian Football Federation
- Confederation: CAF (Africa)
- Sub-confederation: CECAFA (East & Central Africa)
- FIFA code: ETH
First colours	Second colours

African U-17 Women's World Cup qualification
- Appearances: 4 (first in 2016)
- Best result: Round 3 (2022)

FIFA U-17 Women's World Cup
- Appearances: None

Ethiopia women's national under-17 football team is a youth association football team operated under the auspices of Ethiopian Football Federation. Its primary role is the development of players in preparation for the senior Ethiopia women's national football team.

== Competitive record ==
=== FIFA U-17 Women's World Cup record ===
FIFA U-17 Women's World Cup
Year	Result	Pld	W	D *	L	GF	GA
(New Zealand) 2008	Did not enter						
(Trinidad and Tobago) 2010	Did not enter						
(Azerbaijan) 2012	Did not enter						
(Costa Rica) 2014	Did not enter						
(Jordan) 2016	Did not qualify						
(Uruguay) 2018	Did not qualify						
(India) 2022	Did not qualify						
(Dominican Republic) 2024	Did not qualify						
(Morocco) 2025	To be determined						
Total	0/9						

== See also ==
- Ethiopia women's national football team
- Ethiopia women's national under-20 football team
