= Equatorial Guinea women's national under-17 football team =

Equatorial Guinea women's U-17
- Nickname(s): Nzalang Nacional (National Thunder); Los Elefantes (The Elephants)
- Association: Federación Ecuatoguineana de Fútbol
- Sub-confederation: UNIFFAC (Central Africa)
- FIFA code: EQG
| First colours | Second colours |

African U-17 Women's World Cup qualification
- Appearances: 4 (first in 2013)
- Best result: Round 2 (2013, 2024)

Equatorial Guinea women's national under-17 football team is a youth association football team operated under the auspices of the Equatoguinean Football Federation. Its primary role is the development of players in preparation for the senior Equatorial Guinea women's national football team.

== Competitive record ==
=== FIFA U-17 Women's World Cup record ===
FIFA U-17 Women's World Cup
| Year | Result | Pld | W | D * | L | GF | GA |
|---|---|---|---|---|---|---|---|
| (New Zealand) 2008 | Did not enter | | | | | | |
| (Trinidad and Tobago) 2010 | Did not enter | | | | | | |
| (Azerbaijan) 2012 | Did not enter | | | | | | |
| (Costa Rica) 2014 | Did not enter | | | | | | |
| (Jordan) 2016 | Did not enter | | | | | | |
| (Uruguay) 2018 | Did not enter | | | | | | |
| (India) 2022 | Did not qualify | | | | | | |
| (Dominican Republic) 2024 | Did not qualify | | | | | | |
| (Morocco) 2025 | Withdrawn | | | | | | |
| Total | 0/9 | | | | | | |

== See also ==
- Equatorial Guinea women's national football team
- Equatorial Guinea women's national under-20 football team
