= Esther Banda (footballer) =

Zambian footballer (born 2004)

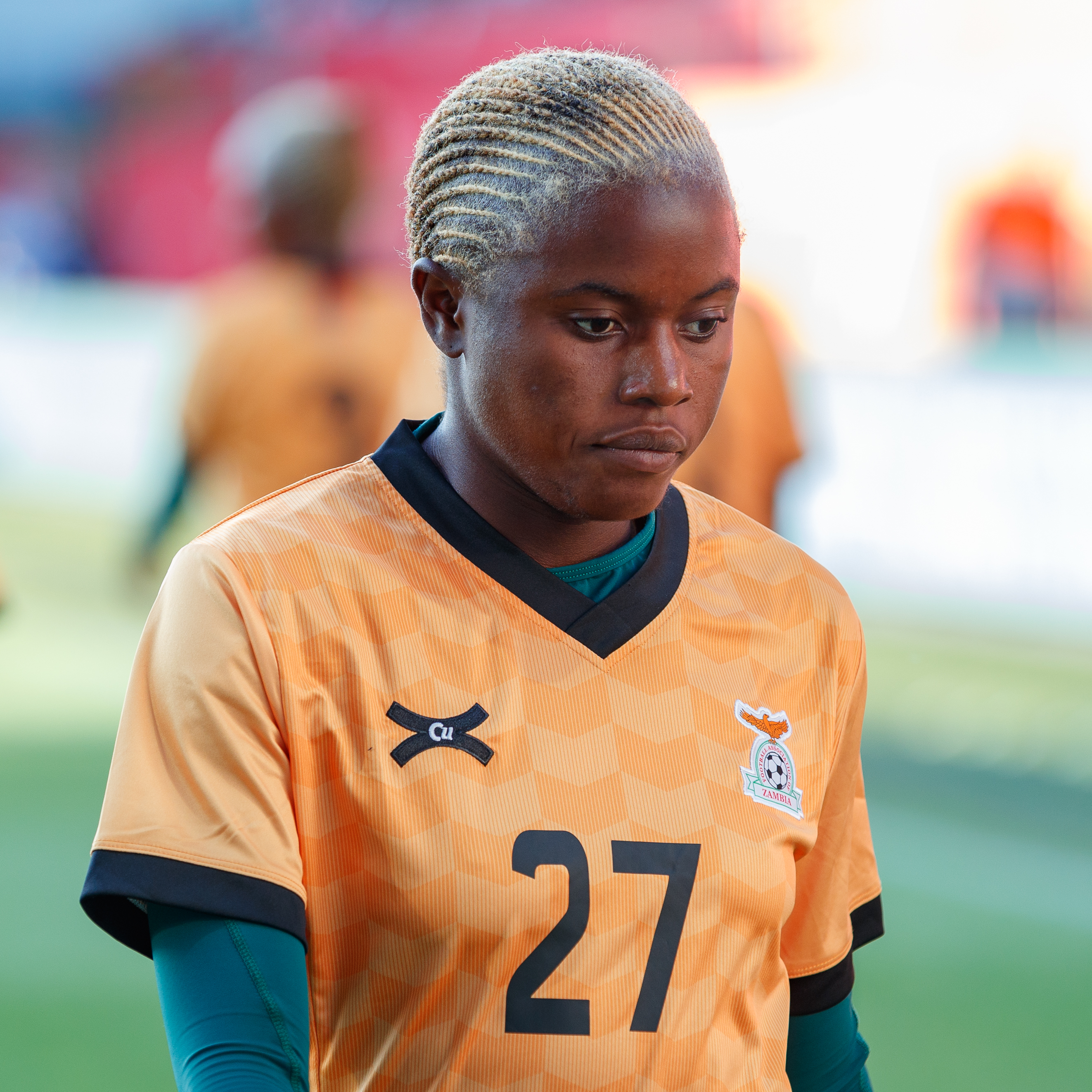

Personal information
- Date of birth: 21 November 2004 (age 21)
- Position: Defender

Team information
- Current team: Bauleni United

Senior career*
Years	Team	Apps	(Gls)
20??–	Bauleni United		

International career
2022–	Zambia	2	(0)
Medal record
Representing Zambia
Women's Africa Cup of Nations
Third place	2022 Morocco
- * Club domestic league appearances and goals

Esther Banda (born 21 November 2004) is a Zambian footballer who plays as a defender for Bauleni United and the Zambia women's national team.

== International career ==
Banda made her senior debut for Zambia on 18 June 2022 in a 1–1 friendly draw with Morocco. After that, she was also at the 2022 Women's Africa Cup of Nations, albeit as an unused substitute.

On 3 July 2023, Banda was named to the squad for the 2023 FIFA Women's World Cup.

== International goals ==
No.	Date	Venue	Opponent	Score	Result	Competition
1.	4 December 2023	Nkoloma Stadium, Lusaka, Zambia	Angola	5–0	6–0	2024 Women's Africa Cup of Nations qualification

== Honours ==
Zambia

- COSAFA Women's Championship: 2022
