= Malawi women's national under-17 football team =

National U-17 association football team

Malawi under-17
- Nickname: Baby Scorchers
- Association: Football Association of Malawi
- Confederation: CAF
- Sub-confederation: COSAFA
- Top scorer: Rose Kadzere (8 goals)

First international
- South Africa 4-1 Malawi (Lilongwe, Malawi; 1 December 2022) )

Biggest win
- Malawi 12-0 Namibia (Lilongwe, Malawi; 5 December 2022)

Biggest defeat
- South Africa 4-1 Malawi (Lilongwe, Malawi; 1 December 2022)

COSAFA U-17 Women's Championship
- Appearances: 2 (first in 2022)
- Best result: (bronze) Third (2022)

The Malawi women's national under-17 football team, also known as the Baby Scorchers, is a youth football team which represents Malawi and is controlled by the Football Association of Malawi, the governing body for football in Malawi. The team's main objective is to qualify and play at the FIFA U-17 Women's World Cup and develop players for the main national team Scorchers.

== History ==
The team made their COSAFA U-17 Girls' Championship debut in 2022 where they finished in third place.

== Results and fixtures ==
The following is a list of match results in the last 12 months, as well as any future matches that have been scheduled.

Legend

Win Draw Loss Fixture

== Statistics ==
=== Top goal scorers ===
Active players in bold, statistics correct as of November 2024.

Rank	Player	Goals
1.	Rose Kadzere	**8**
2.	Faith Chinzimu	6
3.	Leticia Chinyamula	4
4.	**Jean Fyson**	3
