= Namibia women's national under-17 football team =

National U-17 association football team

Namibia under-17
- Nickname: Baby Gladiators
- Association: Namibia Football Association
- Confederation: CAF
- Sub-confederation: COSAFA
- Head coach: Hafeni Ndeitunga

Biggest defeat
- Namibia 0-12 South Africa (Lilongwe, Malawi; 3 December 2022); Malawi 12-0 Namibia (Lilongwe, Malawi; 5 December 2022)

COSAFA U-17 Women's Championship
- Appearances: 3 (first in 2021)
- Best result: (bronze) Third (2021)
Medal record
COSAFA U-17 Women's Championship
Third place	2021 Lesotho

The Namibia women's national under-17 football team (Baby Gladiators), is a youth football team, which represents Namibia and is controlled by the Namibia Football Association, the governing body for football in Namibia. The team's main objective is to qualify and play at the FIFA U-17 Women's World Cup and develop players for the main national team Brave Gladiators.

== History ==
The team made their COSAFA U-17 Girls' Championship debut in 2021. They made their African U-17 Women's World Cup qualification in 2025. They lost 0-10 and 8-1 to Uganda in their maiden qualifiers.

== Results and fixtures ==
The following is a list of match results in the last 12 months, as well as any future matches that have been scheduled.

Legend

Win Draw Loss Fixture

== Honours ==
- 2021 COSAFA U-17 Women's Championship: Third

== See also ==
- Namibia women's national football team
- Namibia women's national under-20 football team
