= South Africa women's national under-17 soccer team =

South Africa under-17
- Nickname: Bantwana
- Association: South African Football Association
- Confederation: CAF (Africa)
- Sub-confederation: COSAFA
- Head coach: Ntombifuthi Khumalo
- Captain: Katleho Malebane
- Top scorer: Oyisa Marhasi (11 goals)
- Home stadium: FNB Stadium
- FIFA code: RSA
| First colours | Second colours |

First international
- Cameroon 2–0 South Africa (Yaoundé, Cameroon; 2008)

Biggest win
- Seychelles 0–28 South Africa (Port Louis, Mauritius; 21 September 2019)

Biggest defeat
- South Africa 0–9 Mexico; Germany 10–1 South Africa (Scarborough, Trinidad and Tobago; 8 September 2010)

African U-17 Cup of Nations
- Appearances: 6 (first in 2008)
- Best result: (gold) Champions (2010, 2018)

COSAFA U-17 Women's Championship
- Appearances: 3 (first in 2019)
- Best result: (gold) Champions (2022)

FIFA U-17 Women's World Cup
- Appearances: 2 (first in 2010)
- Best result: Group stage (2010, 2018)
Medal record
COSAFA U-17 Women's Championship
| First place | 2022 Malawi |
| Second place | 2019 Mauritius |
| Third place | 2020 South Africa |

The South Africa women's national under-17 soccer team, nicknamed Bantwana, represents South Africa in international under-17 women's soccer. It is controlled by the South African Football Association, the governing body for soccer in South Africa. The team's main objective is to qualify and play at the FIFA U-17 Women's World Cup and develop players for the senior national team (Banyana Banyana).

Bantwana hold the African record for most goals in an international match. They scored 28 goals (won 28–0) against Seychelles in the opening match of group B at the 2019 COSAFA U-17 Women's Championship.

== History ==
=== FIFA U-17 Women's World Cup ===
The team qualified for their maiden FIFA U-17 Women's World Cup at the 2010 FIFA U-17 Women's World Cup in Trinidad & Tobago. This feat made the first women's team to qualify for the World Cup. Banyana Banyana would make their World Cup debut nine years later in 2019.

In 2018, they qualified for the 2018 FIFA U-17 Women's World Cup in Uruguay making their second appearance at the FIFA U-17 Women's World Cup.

=== African U-17 Women's World Cup qualification ===
In the 2025 qualification, they reached the second round with a 21–2 aggregate win over Gabon. They failed to reach the third round qualifiers after a 5–1 aggregate loss to Nigeria.

=== COSAFA U-17 Women's Championship ===
The competed in the inaugural tournament in 2019 held in Mauritius. They were runners-up to Uganda in a 2–1 defeat in the final. They set the African goal scoring record (28 goals) in that championship.

They won their maiden COSAFA title at the 2022 edition, defeating Zambia by 4 goals to 3 in the final.

In 2025 the team did not enter the competition citing a tight school schedule as the reason.

== Results and fixtures ==
The following is a list of match results in the last 12 months, as well as any future matches that have been scheduled.

Legend

Win Draw Loss Fixture

== Current squad ==
The following 20 players were selected for the 2024 COSAFA U-17 Women's Championship held in South Africa between 4 December – 13 December 2024:

| No. | Pos. | Player | Date of birth (age) | Club |
|---|---|---|---|---|
| 1 | GK | Sphumelele Zibula | | (South African Football Association) Dlala Ntombazana |
| 2 | GK | Dakalo Mafumo | | (South African Football Association) Panorama F.C. |
| 3 | GK | Rose Ann Gerber | | (South African Football Association) Brave Generations Academy |
| 4 | DF | Katlego Mohale | | (South African Football Association) JVW Sapphires |
| 5 | DF | Akhona Smamene | | (South African Football Association) Lindelani Ladies |
| 5 | DF | Dineo Makoala | | (South African Football Association) Future Stars F.C. |
| 5 | DF | Andiswa Zuma | | (South African Football Association) Dlala Ntombazana |
| 6 | DF | Sthabile Kamwande | | (South African Football Association) Mamelodi Sundowns Ladies Academy |
| 7 | DF | Bonolo Mokomo | | (South African Football Association) JVW Sapphires |
| 8 | MF | Nomfundo Nzuza | | (South African Football Association) Dlala Ntombazana |
| 9 | MF | Rethabile Molefe | | (South African Football Association) Springs Home Sweepers |
| 10 | MF | Katleho Malebane | | (South African Football Association) UP-Tuks Ladies |
| 11 | MF | Ambani Raphadana | | (South African Football Association) Sinthumule Kutama |
| 12 | MF | Asanda Ziqubu | | (South African Football Association) Dlala Ntombazana |
| 13 | MF | Nishaat Levy | | (South African Football Association) Salt River Blackpool |
| 14 | FW | Leonay Kock | | (South African Football Association) Royal Wizards |
| 15 | FW | Khwezi Khoza | | (South African Football Association) Durban Ladies |
| 16 | FW | Nobahle Mdelwa | | (South African Football Association) Lindelani Ladies |
| 18 | DF | Alwande Mbatha | | (South African Football Association) Dlala Ntombazana |
| 19 | FW | Okuhle Sithole | | (South African Football Association) Durban Ladies |

=== Top goal scorers ===
Active players in bold, statistics correct as of November 2024.

| Rank | Player | Goals |
|---|---|---|
| 1 | Oyisa Marhasi | **11** |
| 2 | Jessica Wade | 10 |
| 3 | **Khwezi Khoza** | 5 |
| 4 | Miche Minnies | 4 |
| 4 | Karabo Dhlamini | 4 |

=== Managerial history ===
All-time Bantwana coaching records
| Coach | Nat. | Tenure |
|---|---|---|
| Simphiwe Dludlu | South Africa | 2017 – 2021 |
| Nthabeleng Modiko | South Africa | 2022 – 2024 |
| Ntombifuthi Khumalo | South Africa | 2024 – present |

== Competitive record ==
=== FIFA U-17 Women's World Cup record ===
FIFA U-17 Women's World Cup
Appearances: 2
| Year | Round | Position | Pld | W | D | L | GF | GA |
|---|---|---|---|---|---|---|---|---|
| (New Zealand) 2008 | did not qualify | | | | | | | |
| (Trinidad and Tobago) 2010 | Group stage | 16th | 3 | 0 | 0 | 3 | 2 | 17 |
| (Azerbaijan) 2012 | did not qualify | | | | | | | |
| (Costa Rica) 2014 | did not qualify | | | | | | | |
| (Jordan) 2016 | did not qualify | | | | | | | |
| (Uruguay) 2018 | Group stage | 12th | 3 | 0 | 1 | 2 | 1 | 10 |
| (India) 2022 | did not qualify | | | | | | | |
| (Dominican Republic) 2024 | did not qualify | | | | | | | |
| (Morocco) 2025 | did not qualify | | | | | | | |
| (Morocco) 2026 | did not qualify | | | | | | | |
| Total | Group stage | 2/9 | 6 | 0 | 1 | 5 | 3 | 27 |

=== African U-17 Cup of Nations for Women record ===
African U-17 Cup of Nations for Women
Appearances: 6
| Year | Round | Position | Pld | W | D | L | GF | GA |
|---|---|---|---|---|---|---|---|---|
| 2008 | First round | – | 2 | 2^{1} | 0 | 2 | 0 | 3 |
| 2010 | Play-off round | – | 6 | 3 | 1 | 2 | 25 | 9 |
| 2012 | Second round | – | 4 | 1 | 2 | 1 | 7 | 6 |
| 2013 | Second round | – | 2 | 0 | 1 | 1 | 4 | 6 |
| 2016 | Second round | – | 2 | 2^{2} | 0 | 2 | 0 | 7 |
| 2018 | Second round | – | 4 | 4 | 0 | 0 | 17 | 7 |
| 2020 | The 2020 FIFA U-17 Women's World Cup was cancelled due to the COVID-19 pandemic. | | | | | | | |
| 2022 | Third round | – | 2 | 1 | 0 | 1 | 1 | 3 |
| 2024 | Second round | – | 2 | 0 | 1 | 1 | 0 | 3 |
| 2025 | Second round | – | 4 | 2 | 0 | 2 | 22 | 7 |
| 2026 | To be determined | | | | | | | |
| Total | Second round | 6/6 | 28 | 15 | 5 | 12 | 76 | 48 |

- ^1South Africa qualified from the preliminary round by withdrawal of Botswana.
- ^2South Africa qualified from the first round by withdrawal of Zambia.

=== COSAFA U-17 Women's Championship ===
COSAFA U-17 Women's Championship record
| Year | Round | Pld | W | D* | L | GS | GA | GD |
|---|---|---|---|---|---|---|---|---|
| (Mauritius) 2019 | Runners-up | 5 | 4 | 0 | 1 | 39 | 5 | +34 |
| (South Africa) 2020 | Third Place | 4 | 2 | 0 | 2 | 18 | 8 | +10 |
| (Malawi) 2022 | Champions | 4 | 2 | 0 | 0 | 23 | 4 | +19 |
| (South Africa) 2024 | Group Stage | 3 | 2 | 0 | 1 | 9 | 3 | +6 |
| Total | | 16 | 11 | 0 | 4 | 89 | 20 | |

== See also ==
- South Africa women's national football team
- South Africa women's national under-20 soccer team
- South Africa women's national under-15 soccer team
