= Botswana women's national under-17 football team =

Botswana women's U-17
- Nickname(s): The Mares; The Zebras
- Association: Botswana Football Association
- Confederation: CAF (Africa)
- Sub-confederation: COSAFA (Southern Africa)
- FIFA code: BOT
First colours	Second colours

African U-17 Women's World Cup qualification
- Appearances: 7 (first in 2010)
- Best result: Round 2 (2025)

FIFA U-17 Women's World Cup
- Appearances: None

Botswana women's national under-17 football team is a youth association football team operated under the auspices of Botswana Football Association. Its primary role is the development of players in preparation for the senior Botswana women's national football team.

== Competitive record ==
=== FIFA U-17 Women's World Cup record ===
FIFA U-17 Women's World Cup
Year	Result	Pld	W	D *	L	GF	GA
(New Zealand) 2008	Did not enter						
(Trinidad and Tobago) 2010	Did not qualify						
(Azerbaijan) 2012	Did not qualify						
(Costa Rica) 2014	Did not qualify						
(Jordan) 2016	Did not qualify						
(Uruguay) 2018	Did not qualify						
(India) 2022	Did not qualify						
(Dominican Republic) 2024	Did not qualify						
(Morocco) 2025	Did not qualify						
Total	0/9						

== See also ==
- Botswana women's national football team
- Botswana women's national under-20 football team
