= Zambia women's national under-17 football team =

National association football team

Zambia
- Nickname: Copper Princesses
- Association: Football Association of Zambia
- Confederation: CAF
- Sub-confederation: COSAFA (Southern Africa)
- Head coach: Carol Kanyemba
- FIFA code: ZAM
First colours	Second colours

African U-17 Women's World Cup qualification
- Appearances: 5 (first in 2008)
- Best result: Qualified (2013, 2024, 2025, 2026)

FIFA U-17 Women's World Cup
- Appearances: 4 (first in 2014)
- Best result: Round of 16 (2025)

The Zambia women's national under-17 football team (nicknamed the Copper Princesses) represents the country in international under-17 matches. The team has participated in FIFA sanctioned events, including U-17 Women's World Cup qualifiers.

== Background ==
Zambia women's national under-17 football team is nicknamed the Junior She-polopolo. The team's official kit colours include green shorts, a green jersey and green socks. Women's football was formally organised by the Football Association of Zambia in 1983. Since that time, Zambia has created a women's senior national team and an under-20 team. Women's football continues to be supported by the national federation who have budgeted money for the women's game and youth game. In 2009, there were 100 women's teams for players over 16, and 112 youth women's teams for players under 16.

Women's football in Africa as a whole faces problems that include limited access to education, poverty amongst women in the wider society, and fundamental inequality present in the society that occasionally allows for female specific human rights abuses. When quality football players are produced in Africa, often they leave the country to seek greater opportunities elsewhere, to the detriment of the local game. Funding also is a problem for the women's game in Africa, with most of the funding for women's football in the Africa coming from FIFA, not the local national football association.

== Performance ==
Zambia women's national under-17 football team has competed in several competitions representing their country, including in the qualifying part of the FIFA U-17 World Cup, and the African Women U-17 Championships.

The team participated in the 2008, 2010 and 2012 African qualification tournaments for the FIFA U-17 World Cup. Zambia women's national under-17 football team participated in the 2008 African Women U-17 Championship. In the preliminary round, they played Ghana women's national under-17 football team. In the 3 February match in Lusaka, they lost 0–2. In the 17 February match in Accra, Zambia lost 0–4.

The 2012 season coach was Beauty Mwamba. The assistant coach was Angela Sunga. This team competed in the Confederation of African Football qualifiers for the FIFA U-17 World Cup that will be held in Azerbaijan in September 2012. They did not advance out of their region. In the early rounds, Zambia played Botswana women's national under-17 football team in Gaborone, beating them 5–1. In the return match against Botswana in Lusaka, Zambia won 2–0. During qualification, Zambia played Nigeria, losing 1–2 at home and 0–5 in Nigeria. Zambian officials suspected that the Nigerian team cheated by having age ineligible players on their squad. The national federation would have liked to appear the decision but it would have cost US$2,000 (K10 million) and they did not have the money to make the appeal. The loss also brought to question continued support by the Football Association of Zambia to support the team.

== FIFA U-17 Women's World Cup ==
Year	Result	Pld	W	D	L	GF	GA
(New Zealand) 2008	Did not qualify						
(Trinidad and Tobago) 2010	Did not enter						
(Azerbaijan) 2012	Did not qualify						
(Costa Rica) 2014	Group stage	3	1	0	2	2	7
(Jordan) 2016	Did not enter						
(Uruguay) 2018	Did not qualify						
(India) 2022	Did not qualify						
(Dominican Republic) 2024	Group stage	3	0	0	3	1	7
(Morocco) 2025	Round of 16	4	1	0	3	5	10
(Morocco) 2026	Group Stage	3	0	0	3	2	9
(Morocco) 2027	To be determined						
(Morocco) 2028	To be determined						
(Morocco) 2029	To be determined						
Total	4/13	13	2	0	11	10	33

== Head-to-head record ==
The following table shows Zambia's head-to-head record in the FIFA U-17 Women's World Cup.

Opponent	Pld	W	D	L	GF	GA	GD	Win %
Brazil	1	0	0	1	0	1	−1	0.00
Canada	1	0	0	1	0	6	−6	0.00
Costa Rica	1	1	0	0	2	1	+1	100.00
France	1	0	0	1	0	1	−1	0.00
Italy	1	0	0	1	0	2	−2	0.00
Japan	3	0	0	3	1	11	−10	0.00
New Zealand	1	1	0	0	4	0	+4	100.00
Paraguay	1	0	0	1	1	2	−1	0.00
Poland	1	0	0	1	0	2	−2	0.00
Venezuela	2	0	0	2	2	7	−5	0.00
Total	13	2	0	11	10	33	−23	15.38

== See also ==
- Zambia women's national football team
- Zambia women's national under-20 football team
- Zambia men's national under-17 football team
- Zambia men's national under-20 football team
