= COSAFA =

Football association in Southern Africa

Council of Southern Africa Football Associations Conseil des Associations de Football en Afrique Australe Conselho das Associações de Futebol da África Austral

- Formation: 1983
- Type: CAF regional subconfederation
- Headquarters: Johannesburg, South Africa
- Region served: Southern Africa; Western Indian Ocean
- Members: 14 members: Angola; Botswana; Comoros; Eswatini; Lesotho; Madagascar; Malawi; Mauritius; Mozambique; Namibia; Seychelles; (South Africa) South Africa; Zambia; Zimbabwe
- Official language: English, French and Portuguese
- President: (Zimbabwe) Phillip Chiyangwa
- Affiliations: CAF, FIFA
- Website: www.cosafa.com

Council of Southern Africa Football Associations (French: Conseil des Associations de Football en Afrique Australe; Portuguese: Conselho das Associações de Futebol da África Austral), also known by its acronym COSAFA, is a regional subconfederation affiliated with CAF and the governing body for football in Southern Africa that includes the Islands in the Western Indian Ocean.

The COSAFA organises competitions for men's and women's national teams in the Southern African region, its premier competitions for national teams are the COSAFA Cup and the COSAFA Women's Championship.

== Executive committee ==
The 2008 annual general assembly saw the election of the new COSAFA Executive Committee. Previously the committee consisted of 14 members; the new committee now consists of seven members: the president, vice-president and five members, as well as the chief operations officer. The most recent committee was elected on 17 December 2016.

Name	Occupation
President
(Angola) Artur de Almeida e Silva	President of The Angolan Football Federation
Vice-president:
(Namibia) Frans Mbidi	President of the Namibia Football Association
Members
(Mozambique) Alberto Simanga	President of the Mozambican Football Federation
(Zambia) Andrew Kamanga	President of the Football Association of Zambia
(Angola) Pedro Neto	President of the Angolan Football Federation
(Mauritius) Sameer Sobha	President of the Mauritius Football Association
(Malawi) Walter Nyamilandu-Manda	President of the Football Association of Malawi

The term of office of the COSAFA President is five years and that of the Vice President is four years. The other office bearer is three years.

== Member associations ==
All associations that joined in 1997 were founding members of COSAFA. Comoros is the only COSAFA member to also be a member of the Union of Arab Football Associations. Réunion's governing body, Réunionese Football League, is only an associate member of COSAFA. Since Comoros joined in 2007, COSAFA has had 14 member associations.

Country	Year	Governing body
Angola	1997	Angolan Football Federation
Botswana	1997	Botswana Football Association
Comoros	2007	Comoros Football Federation
Eswatini	1997	Eswatini Football Association
Lesotho	1997	Lesotho Football Association
Madagascar	2000	Malagasy Football Federation
Malawi	1997	Football Association of Malawi
Mauritius	2000	Mauritius Football Association
Mozambique	1997	Mozambican Football Federation
Namibia	1997	Namibia Football Association
Seychelles	2000	Seychelles Football Federation
South Africa	1997	South African Football Association
Zambia	1997	Football Association of Zambia
Zimbabwe	1997	Zimbabwe Football Association

== Competitions ==
COSAFA runs several competitions which cover men's, women's, youth.

=== Current title holders ===
Competition	Year	Champions	Title	Runners-up	Next edition	Dates
National teams
COSAFA Cup	2025	Angola	5th	South Africa	2026	TBD
COSAFA U-20 Championship	2025	South Africa	10th	Malawi	2026	18-27 September
COSAFA U-17 Championship	2025	South Africa	4th	Angola	TBD	TBD
COSAFA Boys Schools Cup	2025	Zambia	1st	South Africa	2026	TBD
COSAFA Beach Soccer Championship	2024	Morocco^{g}	1st	Mozambique	TBD	TBD
National teams (women)
COSAFA Women's Championship	2025	Namibia	1st	South Africa	2026	TBD
COSAFA U-20 Women's Championship	2025	Zambia	2nd	South Africa	TBD	TBD
COSAFA U-17 Women's Championship	2025	Zambia	3rd	Malawi	TBD	TBD
COSAFA Girls Schools Cup	2025	Zambia	1st	South Africa	TBD	TBD
Club teams (women)
COSAFA Women's Champions League	2025	(Botswana) Gaborone United Ladies	1st	(Zambia) ZESCO Ndola Girls	2026	TBD

- ^ginvited guest-nation

== Controversy ==
On 17 October 2023, it was confirmed by COSAFA organisers that the 2023 Women's Championship winners Malawi would receive zero prize money after their 2–1 over Zambia in the final.

== Rankings ==
=== Football ===
FIFA Rankings (as of 7 October 2026)
COSAFA*	FIFA	+/−	National Team	Points
1	48	▲6	South Africa	1468.88
2	83	▲4	Angola	1281.79
3	91	▼1	Zambia	1260.61
4	98	▲5	Mozambique	1238.23
5	106	▼2	Madagascar	1197.24
6	107	▲1	Comoros	1192.28
7	123	▼2	Namibia	1146.48
8	129	▲1	Zimbabwe	1128.05
9	131	▼2	Malawi	1121.84
10	141	▲6	Botswana	1073.85
11	150	▼4	Lesotho	1053.09
12	164	▲1	Eswatini	979.01
13	179	▼1	Mauritius	906.24
14	205	▼1	Seychelles	795.63

FIFA Rankings (as of 20 October 2026)
COSAFA*	FIFA	+/−	National Team	Points
1	59	▼2	South Africa	1427.91
2	70	▼5	Zambia	1363.47
3	104	▲49	Malawi	1177.33
4	131	▼6	Namibia	1099.86
5	136	▼9	Zimbabwe	1078.3
6	153	▲2	Angola	1011.42
7	155	▼7	Botswana	1005.65
8	173	Steady	Mozambique	874.79
9	177	▲1	Lesotho	836.43
10	178	▼3	Seychelles	836.36
11	184	Steady	Eswatini	797.06
12	187	Steady	Comoros	749.38
13	191	Steady	Madagascar	726.73
14	198	Steady	Mauritius	435.47

=== Futsal ===
FIFA Rankings (as of 24 September 2026)
COSAFA*	FIFA	+/−	National Team	Points
1	53	▲1	Angola	1048.16
2	61	▲1	South Africa	1004.53
3	78	Steady	Mozambique	970.84
4	82	▲4	Zambia	963.73
5	102	Steady	Comoros	901.65
6	106	Steady	Mauritius	878.18
7	135	▲1	Namibia	738.98

FIFA Rankings (as of 24 September 2026)
COSAFA*	FIFA	+/−	National Team	Points
1	84	Steady	Angola	736.89
2	87	Steady	Madagascar	711.55
3	89	Steady	Namibia	701.02

=== Beach Soccer ===
BSWW Rankings (as of 2 September 2026)
COSAFA*	BSWW	+/−	National Team	Points
1	45	Steady	Seychelles	192.75
2	50	▲3	Mozambique	168.25
3	63	▼1	Malawi	124.25
4	82	Steady	Madagascar	29.75
5	86	▼1	Comoros	19

== See also ==
- Confederation of African Football (CAF)
- Central African Football Federations' Union (UNIFFAC)
- Council for East and Central Africa Football Associations (CECAFA)
- Union of North African Football Federations (UNAF)
- West African Football Union (WAFU)
