= 2026 WAFU Zone B U-17 Girls Cup =

U-17 Coupe féminine UFOA Zone B Côte d'Ivoire 2026

Tournament details
- Host country: Ivory Coast
- City: Yamoussoukro
- Dates: 15 – 27 September
- Teams: 6 (from 1 sub-confederation)
- Venues: 3 (in 1 host city)

Final positions
- Champions: Nigeria (1st title)
- Runners-up: Ghana
- Third place: Burkina Faso
- Fourth place: Ivory Coast

Tournament statistics
- Matches played: 15
- Goals scored: 70 (4.67 per match)
- Top scorer: (Ghana) Seidatu Wahab
- Best player: (Nigeria) Oluwakemi Adegbuyi
- Best goalkeeper: (Nigeria) Onyinyechi Opara

The 2026 WAFU Zone B U-17 Girls Cup was the second edition of the WAFU Zone B U-17 Girls Cup, the international women's youth football championship contested by the under-17 national teams of the member associations of the West African Football Union Zone B. The tournament took place in Ivory Coast between 15 – 27 September 2026.

== Teams ==
=== Participating nations ===
Six out of seven team of WAFU zone B members associations confirmed participation in the first edition in Ivory Coast.

Team	App	Last	Best placement in the tournament
Burkina Faso	1st	—N/a	debut
Ghana	2nd	2024	Champions (2024)
Ivory Coast	2nd	2024	Fourth Place (2024)
Niger	2nd	2024	Group stage (2024)
Nigeria	2nd	2024	Runners-up (2024)
Togo	1st	—N/a	debut

=== Draw ===
The initial draw took place in Ouagadougou, Ivory Coast, on 3 September 2026.

Group A	Group B
Ivory Coast (hosts); Benin; Burkina Faso	Ghana; Niger; Nigeria; Togo

After being drawn in group B the Benin team withdrew.

Thus the tournament shifted to a single-group league format utilizing a round-robin competition after Benin's late withdrew from the tournament.

== Venues ==
In September 2026, WAFU B announced Yamoussoukro as the host city and confirmed venues selected for the tournament.

Cities	Venues	Capacity
Yamoussoukro	Charles Konan Banny Stadium	20,000
Yamoussoukro	Lycée Scientifique	
Yamoussoukro	INPHB Centre	

== Squads ==
Players born before 1 January 2009 are eligible to compete in the tournament.

== Match officials ==
The following match officials were selected for the tournament.

=== Referees ===
- (Ghana) Mercy Boakyewaa
- (Nigeria) Gbemisola Yusuf
- (Nigeria) Scholastica Ikeobi
- (Togo) Amekedzi Véronique

=== Assistant referees ===
- (Ghana) Patricia Kyeraa
- (Togo) Kouessan Diane

== Tournament ==
All times are local, GMT (UTC+0)

Tiebreakers
The ranking of teams in each group was determined by the points obtained in all group matches. If two or more teams were equal on points, the following criteria were used to determine the ranking:
1. Points in head-to-head matches among tied teams;
2. Goal difference in head-to-head matches among tied teams;
3. Goals scored in head-to-head matches among tied teams;
4. If more than two teams are tied, and after applying all head-to-head criteria above, a subset of teams are still tied, all head-to-head criteria above are reapplied exclusively to this subset of teams;
5. Goal difference in all group matches;
6. Goals scored in all group matches;
7. Penalty shoot-out if only two teams are tied and they met in the last round of the group;
8. Disciplinary points (yellow card = 1 point, red card as a result of two yellow cards = 3 points, direct red card = 3 points, yellow card followed by direct red card = 4 points);
9. Drawing of lots.

Pos	Team	Pld	W	D	L	GF	GA	GD	Pts	Qualification	(Nigeria women's national under-17 football team)	(Ghana women's national under-17 football team)	(Burkina Faso women's national under-17 football team)	(Ivory Coast women's national under-17 football team)	(Togo women's national under-17 football team)	(Niger women's national under-17 football team)
1	Nigeria (C)	5	5	0	0	17	2	+15	15	Champions		4–2	2–0	2–0	4–0	5–0
2	Ghana	5	4	0	1	20	5	+15	12	Runners-up			4–0	4–0	4–0	6–1
3	Burkina Faso	5	3	0	2	11	7	+4	9	Third place				1–0	2–1	8–0
4	Ivory Coast (H)	5	2	0	3	12	9	+3	6						3–2	9–0
5	Togo	5	1	0	4	7	15	−8	3							4–2
6	Niger	5	0	0	5	3	32	−29	0							

Updated to match(es) played on 27 September 2026. Source: WAFU B
Rules for classification: Group stage tiebreakers
(C) Champions; (H) Hosts

=== Matches ===
==== Matchday 1 ====
15 September 2026
15:00

Ivory Coast	3–2	Togo
Bakaro 54' (pen.); Boka 64'; Koudou 90+5'	Report	Aawi 79' (pen.); Ayiterou 90+4'

Charles Konan Banny Stadium, Yamoussoukro

15 September 2026
18:00

Ghana	4–0	Burkina Faso
Wahab 6' (pen.); Ameaa 45+3'; Danso 73'; Adams 84'	Report

Charles Konan Banny Stadium, Yamoussoukro

16 September 2026
15:00

Nigeria	5–0	Niger
Sarafa 16'; Bashiru 35'; Sunday 83'; Dunstan 84'; Rotimi 90+4'	Report

Lycée Scientifique, Yamoussoukro

==== Matchday 2 ====
18 September 2026
09:00

Burkina Faso	1–0	Ivory Coast
Ouattara 17'	Report

Lycée Scientifique, Yamoussoukro

18 September 2026
14:00

Togo	4–2	Niger
Adjoda 7'; Aawi 10'; Akossi 45+2'; Adamou 66' (o.g.)	Report	Moustapha 46'; Oumarou 74'

Lycée Scientifique, Yamoussoukro

18 September 2026
18:00

Ghana	2–4	Nigeria
Wahab 62'; Ameaa 90'	Report	Adegbuyi 33'; Chidi 45+2'; Dunstan 70'; Akanji 87'

Lycée Scientifique, Yamoussoukro

==== Matchday 3 ====
21 September 2026
09:00

Niger	0–9	Ivory Coast
	Report	Grace 2', 4', 15'; Bakaro 45+2'; Victoire 59'; Reine 78', 81', 90+1'; Ornela 86'

INPHB Centre, Yamoussoukro

21 September 2026
14:00

Burkina Faso	0–2	Nigeria
	Report	Dunstan 82'; Adegbuyi 90+4'

Lycée Scientifique, Yamoussoukro

21 September 2026
18:00

Togo	0–4	Ghana
	Report	Ameaa 3'; Wahab 9' (pen.); Achiaa 53', 69'

Lycée Scientifique, Yamoussoukro

==== Matchday 4 ====
24 September 2026
09:00

Niger	1–6	Ghana
Oumarou 2'	Report	Wahab 10', 51'; Abass 20'; Shani 27'; Yeboah 46'; Amadu 90+2'

INPHB Centre, Yamoussoukro

24 September 2026
14:00

Burkina Faso	2–1	Togo
Goribie 2'; Bagagnan 50'	Report	Lahi 78'

Lycée Scientifique, Yamoussoukro

24 September 2026
18:00

Ivory Coast	0–2	Nigeria
	Report	Adegbuyi 4'; Oparanmegwa 83'

Lycée Scientifique, Yamoussoukro

==== Matchday 5 ====
27 September 2026
09:00

Nigeria	4–0	Togo
Chidi 15' (pen.), 35' (pen.); Umejiaku 67'; Adegbuyi 90'	Report

Lycée Scientifique, Yamoussoukro

27 September 2026
14:00

Ivory Coast	0–4	Ghana
	Report	Wahab 14' (pen.); Ameaa 32'; Mannebe 79'; Nana 87'

Lycée Scientifique, Yamoussoukro

27 September 2026
18:00

Niger	0–8	Burkina Faso
	Report	Ouattara 2', 69', 75'; Sankandé 4', 14'; Belem 6'; Kinda 78'; Germina 90+3'

Lycée Scientifique, Yamoussoukro

== Goalscorers ==
There were 70 goals scored in 15 matches, for an average of 4.67 goals per match.

6 goals

- (Ghana) Seidatu Wahab

4 goals

- (Burkina Faso) Fatim Ouattara
- (Nigeria) kemi Adegbuyi

3 goals

- (Ghana) Gloria Ameaa
- (Ivory Coast) Gnadou Grace
- (Ivory Coast) Appoh Reine
- (Nigeria) Mary Dunstan
- (Nigeria) Harmony Chidi

2 goals

- (Burkina Faso) Yasmina Sankandé
- (Ghana) Linda Achiaa
- (Ivory Coast) Fatim Bakaro
- (Niger) Rakietou Oumarou
- (Togo) Essodessam Aawi

1 goal

- (Burkina Faso) Carine Goribie
- (Burkina Faso) Fadila Bagagnan
- (Burkina Faso) Oomou Belem
- (Burkina Faso) Radia Kinda
- (Burkina Faso) Tewende Germina
- (Ghana) Hajara Adams
- (Ghana) Daniella Abass
- (Ghana) Zainab Shani
- (Ghana) Anita Yeboah
- (Ghana) Sekinatu Amadu
- (Ghana) Gloria Adomako
- (Ghana) Philipa Mannebe
- (Ghana) Benedicta Danso
- (Ghana) Cynthia Nana
- (Ivory Coast) Ange Désirée Boka
- (Ivory Coast) Tina Bérénice Koudou
- (Ivory Coast) Gueyagnon Victoire
- (Ivory Coast) Mafandje Ornela
- (Niger) Fati Moustapha
- (Nigeria) Sakirat Sarafa
- (Nigeria) Awawu Bashiru
- (Nigeria) Ohunene Sunday
- (Nigeria) Ayomide Rotimi
- (Nigeria) Kaosarat Akanji
- (Nigeria) Pattra Oparanmegwa
- (Nigeria) Oluebube Umejiaku
- (Togo) Odile Ayiterou
- (Togo) Ablavi Adjoda
- (Togo) Oumali Akossi
- (Togo) Rahmatou Lahi

1 own goal

- (Niger) Zeinabou Adamou

== Awards ==
The following awards were given for the tournament:

Top Goal scorer
(Ghana) Seidatu Wahab
Most Valuable Player
(Nigeria) Oluwakemi Adegbuyi
Best Goalkeeper
(Nigeria) Onyinyechi Opara
