= 2026 FIFA U-17 Women's World Cup squads =

Football tournament squads

The following is a list of squads for each national team competing at the 2026 FIFA U-17 Women's World Cup. The tournament is taking place in Morocco, from 17 October to 7 November 2026. It is the tenth biennial international world youth football championship organised by FIFA for the women's under-17 national teams.

Players born between 1 January 2009 and 31 December 2011 are eligible to compete in the tournament. Each team has to register a squad of 21 players, minimum three of whom have to be goalkeepers (regulation article 26.1). The final squads were confirmed by FIFA on 12 October 2026. The full squad listings are below.

The age listed for each player is their age as of 17 October 2026, the first day of the tournament. The club listed is the club for which the player last played a competitive match prior to the tournament. The nationality for each club reflects the national association (not the league) to which the club is affiliated. A flag is included for coaches who are of a different nationality to their team.

== Group A ==
=== Argentina ===
Head coach: Christian Meloni

No.	Pos.	Player	Date of birth (age)	Caps	Goals	Club
1	GK	Bianca Virga	30 March 2011 (aged 15)			(Argentine Football Association) Belgrano
2	DF	Julia Vinhas	27 May 2009 (aged 17)			(Argentine Football Association) Platense
3	MF	Mía Gamarra	12 September 2009 (aged 17)			(Argentine Football Association) Independiente
4	DF	Aitana Díaz	26 May 2009 (aged 17)			(Argentine Football Association) Boca Juniors
5	MF	Agustina Maldonado	19 March 2009 (aged 17)			(Argentine Football Association) River Plate
6	DF	Oriana Bralo	12 February 2009 (aged 17)			(Argentine Football Association) Boca Juniors
7	FW	Julieta Aguilar	29 July 2010 (aged 16)			(Argentine Football Association) Newell's Old Boys
8	FW	Brunella Pilati	22 November 2010 (aged 15)			(United States Soccer Federation) Racing Louisville
9	FW	Mercedes Diz	24 February 2009 (aged 17)			(Argentine Football Association) River Plate
10	FW	Josefina Galarza	19 June 2011 (aged 15)			(Argentine Football Association) Belgrano
11	FW	Violeta Álvarez	28 April 2009 (aged 17)			(Argentine Football Association) Boca Juniors
12	GK	Araceli Saleme	1 December 2009 (aged 16)			(Argentine Football Association) River Plate
13	DF	Briana Lagartera	19 January 2011 (aged 15)			(Argentine Football Association) Boca Juniors
14	FW	Agustina Leguizamón	6 March 2011 (aged 15)			(Argentine Football Association) River Plate
15	MF	Renata Barletta	17 September 2009 (aged 17)			(Argentine Football Association) River Plate
16	MF	Macarena Torre	1 February 2010 (aged 16)			(Argentine Football Association) River Plate
17	MF	Oriana Gómez	22 July 2010 (aged 16)			(Argentine Football Association) San Lorenzo
18	MF	Lola Hernández	22 July 2010 (aged 16)			(Argentine Football Association) Talleres
19	FW	Gabriella Szczuka	8 July 2009 (aged 17)			(United States Soccer Federation) Pateadores
20	MF	Lola Conde	21 September 2009 (aged 17)			(Argentine Football Association) Rosario Central
21	GK	Julia Konjuh	15 October 2009 (aged 17)			(Argentine Football Association) Huracán

=== Germany ===
The final squad was announced on 1 October 2026.

Head coach: Sabine Loderer

No.	Pos.	Player	Date of birth (age)	Caps	Goals	Club
1	GK	Mirja Kropp	8 July 2009 (aged 17)			(German Football Association) RB Leipzig
2	DF	Eva Hell	18 November 2009 (aged 16)			(German Football Association) Eintracht Frankfurt
3	DF	Muriel Dürr	15 January 2009 (aged 17)			(German Football Association) VfB Stuttgart
4	DF	Laura Ernst	16 April 2009 (aged 17)			(German Football Association) SC Freiburg
5	DF	Mariann Noack	19 February 2010 (aged 16)			(German Football Association) Union Berlin
6	MF	Fiona Itgenhorst	15 February 2009 (aged 17)			(German Football Association) Borussia Mönchengladbach
7	MF	Victoria Säring	30 May 2009 (aged 17)			(German Football Association) TSG Hoffenheim
8	MF	Johanna Hebben	26 May 2009 (aged 17)			(German Football Association) SC Freiburg
9	FW	Lena Martens	18 February 2009 (aged 17)			(German Football Association) HSV
10	FW	Johanna Putzer	30 March 2009 (aged 17)			(German Football Association) SC Freiburg
11	MF	Mia Giesen	27 March 2009 (aged 17)			(German Football Association) Borussia Mönchengladbach
12	GK	Anika Dübel	16 May 2009 (aged 17)			(German Football Association) 1. FC Köln
13	DF	Valentina Lutz	10 May 2009 (aged 17)			(Austrian Football Association) RB Salzburg
14	DF	Lynn Feiertag	21 July 2009 (aged 17)			(German Football Association) SC Freiburg
15	DF	Laura Dafinger	12 March 2009 (aged 17)			(German Football Association) Bayern München
16	MF	Dana Kessler	30 January 2009 (aged 17)			(German Football Association) SV 67 Weinberg
17	FW	Marie Kleemann	12 September 2009 (aged 17)			(German Football Association) RB Leipzig
18	DF	Miriam Arici	5 March 2009 (aged 17)			(German Football Association) Borussia Mönchengladbach
19	FW	Mia Kuhn	4 February 2009 (aged 17)			(German Football Association) SC Freiburg
20	FW	Clara Choisy	10 May 2009 (aged 17)			(German Football Association) Bayern München
21	GK	Clementine Engel	20 May 2009 (aged 17)			(German Football Association) HSV

=== Morocco ===
Head coach: Youness Rabie

No.	Pos.	Player	Date of birth (age)	Club
1	GK	Fatiha Naam	3 June 2009 (aged 17)	(Royal Moroccan Football Federation) AS FAR
2	DF	Charaf Boughazi	18 April 2009 (aged 17)	(Royal Spanish Football Federation) Badalona
3	DF	Anissa Hamdani	21 January 2009 (aged 17)	(French Football Federation) Dijon
4	DF	Imene Diyen	15 June 2009 (aged 17)	(French Football Federation) Auxerre
5	DF	Malak Krafia	20 January 2009 (aged 17)	(Italian Football Federation) AC Milan
6	MF	Celia Bouzman	27 March 2009 (aged 17)	(French Football Federation) Toulouse
7	FW	Sonia Abajiou	6 October 2009 (aged 17)	(German Football Association) Eintracht Frankfurt
8	MF	Rita El Miroun	30 August 2009 (aged 17)	(Italian Football Federation) Südtirol
9	FW	Imane Dhissi	8 October 2009 (aged 17)	(German Football Association) Borussia Mönchengladbach
10	FW	Nessma Mouradi	30 April 2009 (aged 17)	(French Football Federation) Paris FC
11	FW	Aya Ait Khouya Mouh	13 April 2009 (aged 17)	(French Football Federation) Paris Saint-Germain
12	GK	Meriem Zeqaqi	19 August 2009 (aged 17)	(Royal Moroccan Football Federation) AS FAR
13	DF	Laila Boushaba	25 November 2009 (aged 16)	(Royal Dutch Football Association) PEC Zwolle
14	DF	Hiba Youssoufi	20 June 2009 (aged 17)	(Royal Moroccan Football Federation) AS FAR
15	MF	Nayla Aagaou	20 September 2011 (aged 15)	(French Football Federation) OL Lyonnes
16	GK	Chaymae Bouzrou	4 February 2010 (aged 16)	(Royal Moroccan Football Federation) AS FAR
17	FW	Sara El Hajouti	31 March 2009 (aged 17)	(Royal Dutch Football Association) Utrecht
18	FW	Soa Ben Amar	3 January 2009 (aged 17)	(Royal Dutch Football Association) Utrecht
19	FW	Nora El Rhachoua	3 August 2010 (aged 16)	(Royal Spanish Football Federation) Atlético Madrid
20	DF	Meryem Oubella	20 June 2009 (aged 17)	(Royal Moroccan Football Federation) Wydad AC
21	FW	Amana Lakradi	4 March 2009 (aged 17)	(Royal Dutch Football Association) AZ

=== New Zealand ===
The final squad was announced on 25 September 2026.

Head coach: Alana Gunn

No.	Pos.	Player	Date of birth (age)	Club
1	GK	Nienke Holland	8 July 2010 (aged 16)	(Royal Dutch Football Association) AZ
2	DF	Micaela Besley	11 March 2009 (aged 17)	(New Zealand Football) Fencibles United
3	DF	Alexandra Hedington	6 January 2011 (aged 15)	(New Zealand Football) Auckland United
4	DF	Mila Clark	25 September 2010 (aged 16)	(New Zealand Football) Fencibles United
5	DF	Eden Chaytor	11 March 2009 (aged 17)	(New Zealand Football) Fencibles United
6	MF	Bree Toatelegese	4 June 2010 (aged 16)	(New Zealand Football) Ellerslie
7	MF	Mia Humphrey	25 October 2009 (aged 16)	(New Zealand Football) Melville United
8	MF	Ariana Vosper	27 July 2010 (aged 16)	(New Zealand Football) Auckland United
9	FW	Lania Fili	14 February 2009 (aged 17)	(Football Australia) Nepean
10	MF	Cate Atkinson	9 May 2009 (aged 17)	(Football Australia) Northern Tigers
11	FW	Amelia Hitchcock	17 February 2009 (aged 17)	(New Zealand Football) Eastern Suburbs
12	GK	Madison Greaves	25 January 2011 (aged 15)	(The Football Association) Crystal Palace
13	FW	Isla Robson	5 June 2009 (aged 17)	(New Zealand Football) Auckland United
14	MF	Bonnie Rice	21 July 2010 (aged 16)	(New Zealand Football) Auckland United
15	DF	Madeleine Dwyer	5 April 2010 (aged 16)	(New Zealand Football) Eastern Suburbs
16	MF	Emmie Butler	16 March 2010 (aged 16)	(Football Australia) Essendon Royals
17	DF	Louisa Egley-Turner	25 March 2010 (aged 16)	(New Zealand Football) Western Suburbs
18	DF	Madison Sharkey	16 November 2009 (aged 16)	(New Zealand Football) Wellington Phoenix
19	FW	Jessica Ellis	25 February 2010 (aged 16)	(New Zealand Football) Western Springs
20	FW	Morgan Day	17 November 2010 (aged 15)	(New Zealand Football) Fencibles United
21	GK	Elin Gainsford	22 April 2009 (aged 17)	(New Zealand Football) Melville United

== Group B ==
=== Nigeria ===
A preliminary 25-player squad was announced on 29 August 2026. The final squad was announced on 6 October 2026.

Head coach: Akeem Busari

No.	Pos.	Player	Date of birth (age)	Club
1	GK	Jane Ijirigho	31 August 2009 (aged 17)	(Nigeria Football Federation) Nasarawa Amazons
2	DF	Elizabeth Adesuyi	8 March 2010 (aged 16)	(Nigeria Football Federation) Pacesetter Queens
3	DF	Azeezat Oduntan	10 July 2009 (aged 17)	(Nigeria Football Federation) Robo
4	MF	Muinat Rotimi	25 March 2009 (aged 17)	(Nigeria Football Federation) Nakamura Academy
5	DF	Ohunene Sunday	22 August 2010 (aged 16)	(Nigeria Football Federation) Nasarawa Amazons
6	DF	Pattra Oparanmegwa	7 June 2009 (aged 17)	(Nigeria Football Federation) Bayelsa Queens
7	FW	Queen Joseph	24 November 2009 (aged 16)	(Nigeria Football Federation) Fosla Academy
8	MF	Mary Dunstan	1 November 2010 (aged 15)	(Nigeria Football Federation) Bayelsa Queens
9	FW	Chidera Chidi	21 October 2009 (aged 16)	(Nigeria Football Federation) Bayelsa Queens
10	MF	Favour Nkwocha	27 April 2009 (aged 17)	(Nigeria Football Federation) Robo
11	MF	Awawu Bashiru	30 March 2010 (aged 16)	(Nigeria Football Federation) Confluence Queens
12	MF	Tosin Rafiu	8 June 2010 (aged 16)	(Nigeria Football Federation) Robo
13	DF	Esther Stephen	29 March 2010 (aged 16)	(Nigeria Football Federation) Unication
14	FW	Oluwakemi Adegbuyi	17 March 2010 (aged 16)	(Nigeria Football Federation) Robo
15	MF	Precious Oscar	7 October 2009 (aged 17)	(Nigeria Football Federation) Edo Queens
16	GK	Onyinyechi Opara	16 December 2009 (aged 16)	(Nigeria Football Federation) Delta Queens
17	FW	Oluebube Umejiaku	1 May 2010 (aged 16)	(Nigeria Football Federation) Heartland Queens
18	FW	Sakirat Sarafa	4 July 2009 (aged 17)	(Nigeria Football Federation) Remo Stars
19	DF	Kanyinsola Yusuf	31 January 2010 (aged 16)	(Nigeria Football Federation) Robo
20	MF	Kaosarat Akanji	7 April 2011 (aged 15)	(Nigeria Football Federation) DreamStar Ladies
21	GK	Mercy Felix	26 December 2010 (aged 15)	(Nigeria Football Federation) Obosa FA

=== North Korea ===
Head coach: Ji Yun-nam

No.	Pos.	Player	Date of birth (age)	Caps	Goals	Club
1	GK	Son Gyong Kim	19 March 2009 (aged 17)			(DPR Korea Football Association) April 25
2	DF	So Yon Kim	22 August 2009 (aged 17)			(DPR Korea Football Association) Pyongyang City
3	DF	Kyong Ryong Pak	15 October 2010 (aged 16)			(DPR Korea Football Association) April 25
4	MF	Nam Mi Kim	13 March 2010 (aged 16)			(DPR Korea Football Association) Rimyongsu
5	DF	Pok Rim Ri	6 February 2009 (aged 17)			(DPR Korea Football Association) Naegohyang
6	MF	Chong Gum Eh	21 January 2009 (aged 17)			(DPR Korea Football Association) Sobaeksu
7	MF	Ui Gyong Ri	19 July 2009 (aged 17)			(DPR Korea Football Association) April 25
8	MF	Yon Chong Uh	25 October 2010 (aged 15)			(DPR Korea Football Association) Naegohyang
9	MF	Kyong Im Ri	26 March 2009 (aged 17)			(DPR Korea Football Association) April 25
10	FW	Yu Jong-hyang	18 August 2009 (aged 17)			(DPR Korea Football Association) April 25
11	MF	Ye Rim So	22 January 2009 (aged 17)			(DPR Korea Football Association) Amrokgang
12	MF	Sol Gyong Won	23 February 2009 (aged 17)			(DPR Korea Football Association) Sobaeksu
13	DF	Hyo Yang Ri	20 February 2009 (aged 17)			(DPR Korea Football Association) April 25
14	FW	Won Yong Song	7 January 2020 (aged 6)			(DPR Korea Football Association) April 25
15	FW	Won Sim Kim	13 May 2010 (aged 16)			(DPR Korea Football Association) April 25
16	DF	Yu Song Ri	2 January 2009 (aged 17)			(DPR Korea Football Association) April 25
17	MF	Ye Rim Ri	26 December 2010 (aged 15)			(DPR Korea Football Association) April 25
18	GK	Su Jong Ri	25 January 2010 (aged 16)			(DPR Korea Football Association) Naegoyhyang
19	DF	Ryong Yong Jo	19 February 2009 (aged 17)			(DPR Korea Football Association) April 25
20	MF	Ju Gyong Kim	9 January 2010 (aged 16)			(DPR Korea Football Association) Amrokgang
21	GK	Ryu Mi Hong	2 June 2009 (aged 17)			(DPR Korea Football Association) Sobaeksu

=== Poland ===
The final squad was announced on 23 September 2026.

Head coach: Paulina Kawalec

No.	Pos.	Player	Date of birth (age)	Club
1	GK	Dominika Lemańczyk	24 July 2009 (aged 17)	(Polish Football Association) SMS Łódź
2	MF	Laura Urbańczyk	28 May 2009 (aged 17)	(Polish Football Association) SMS Łódź
3	DF	Lena Saja	25 December 2009 (aged 16)	(Polish Football Association) Czarni Sosnowiec
4	MF	Zuzanna Zakrzewska	12 March 2010 (aged 16)	(Polish Football Association) KKP Bydgoszcz
5	DF	Zoa Świtała	11 March 2009 (aged 17)	(Polish Football Association) Czarni Sosnowiec
6	MF	Michalina Wiśniewska	18 March 2010 (aged 16)	(Polish Football Association) Lech Poznań
7	MF	Oliwia Grewling	17 October 2009 (aged 17)	(Polish Football Association) Pogoń Szczecin
8	FW	Natalia Skrok	2 November 2009 (aged 16)	(Polish Football Association) Rekord Bielsko-Biała
9	FW	Zoa Cendrowska	2 November 2010 (aged 15)	(Swedish Football Association) AIK
10	FW	Wiktoria Skrzypczak	8 January 2009 (aged 17)	(Italian Football Federation) Parma
11	DF	Nicola Gałuszka	27 December 2010 (aged 15)	(Polish Football Association) Czarni Sosnowiec
12	GK	Amelia Sikora	17 August 2009 (aged 17)	(Polish Football Association) KKP Bydgoszcz
13	DF	Helena Zarzycka	17 May 2010 (aged 16)	(Polish Football Association) Legia Warsaw
14	FW	Zoa Burzan	30 May 2009 (aged 17)	(Polish Football Association) Czarni Sosnowiec
15	MF	Maja Leśkiewicz	7 June 2009 (aged 17)	(Polish Football Association) Pogoń Szczecin
16	MF	Olga Polewska	3 September 2009 (aged 17)	(Polish Football Association) Śląsk Wrocław
17	MF	Julia Kania	4 December 2010 (aged 15)	(Polish Football Association) Rekord Bielsko-Biała
18	MF	Marta Kwiatkowska	18 January 2009 (aged 17)	(Polish Football Association) Lech Poznań
19	MF	Blanka Zając	5 January 2009 (aged 17)	(Polish Football Association) Pogoń Szczecin
20	DF	Maja Wiśniewska	24 November 2009 (aged 16)	(Polish Football Association) KKP Bydgoszcz
21	GK	Hanna Buchta	12 February 2009 (aged 17)	(Polish Football Association) Rekord Bielsko-Biała

=== Puerto Rico ===
Head coach: (Argentina) Andrés Mirabelli

No.	Pos.	Player	Date of birth (age)	Caps	Goals	Club
1	GK	Melodee Martinez	24 February 2010 (aged 16)			(United States Soccer Federation) Florida Premier
2	DF	Jaeda Russell	15 March 2010 (aged 16)			(United States Soccer Federation) Florida Premier
3	DF	Sandra Mae O’Neill	17 July 2009 (aged 17)			(United States Soccer Federation) PDA Blue
4	DF	Camila Adame	31 January 2009 (aged 17)			(United States Soccer Federation) Sporting JAX
5	DF	Camryn Smith	23 January 2009 (aged 17)			(United States Soccer Federation) Boca ECNL
6	FW	Rhaya Everts	13 January 2009 (aged 17)			(United States Soccer Federation) Florida Kraze Krush
7	MF	Zoe Melia	17 August 2009 (aged 17)			(United States Soccer Federation) FSA FC
8	DF	Reese Lanier	28 December 2009 (aged 16)			(United States Soccer Federation) Charlotte Independence
9	FW	Aleeya Olmo	1 January 2011 (aged 15)			(United States Soccer Federation) Penn Fusion
10	MF	Giselle Falcon	12 January 2009 (aged 17)			(United States Soccer Federation) Bethesda SC
11	FW	Caroline Rivera	9 June 2011 (aged 15)			(United States Soccer Federation) Atlanta United
12	GK	Amanda Vega Rios	1 September 2009 (aged 17)			(United States Soccer Federation) Orlando Pride
13	FW	Megan Riviera	25 July 2010 (aged 16)			(United States Soccer Federation) Concorde Fire
14	DF	Daovy Acevedo	26 August 2009 (aged 17)			(United States Soccer Federation) Florida United
15	DF	Isabella Sanabria-Cora	9 February 2009 (aged 17)			(United States Soccer Federation) LAFC So Cal Youth
16	DF	Zoriah Jones	26 January 2010 (aged 16)			(United States Soccer Federation) Florida Kraze Krush
17	MF	Amanda Echevarria	23 September 2009 (aged 17)			(United States Soccer Federation) Black Rock
18	GK	Victoria Moore-Torres	6 July 2009 (aged 17)			(United States Soccer Federation) Florida Kraze Krush
19	MF	Mia Colon	18 December 2009 (aged 16)			(Puerto Rican Football Federation) Puerto Rico Surf
20	MF	Selymar Centeno	19 August 2009 (aged 17)			(Puerto Rican Football Federation) Fraigcomar
21	MF	Amanda Quinones	12 January 2010 (aged 16)			(Puerto Rican Football Federation) Coamo FC

== Group C ==
=== Brazil ===
A preliminary 28-player squad was announced on 15 September 2026. The final squad was announced on 4 October 2026.

Head coach: Rilany

No.	Pos.	Player	Date of birth (age)	Caps	Goals	Club
1	GK	Nathy	6 April 2011 (aged 15)			(Brazilian Football Confederation) Corinthians
2	DF	Isa Rech	31 August 2009 (aged 17)			(Brazilian Football Confederation) Internacional
3	DF	Elo	18 May 2010 (aged 16)			(Brazilian Football Confederation) São Paulo
4	DF	Yasmin Queiroz	1 September 2009 (aged 17)			(Brazilian Football Confederation) Ferroviária
5	DF	Andreyna	2 March 2009 (aged 17)			(Brazilian Football Confederation) Ferroviária
6	DF	Sarah Coelho	31 August 2010 (aged 16)			(Brazilian Football Confederation) São Paulo
7	MF	Gigi Pires	13 September 2010 (aged 16)			(Brazilian Football Confederation) São Paulo
8	MF	Carol Melo	28 December 2009 (aged 16)			(Brazilian Football Confederation) Corinthians
9	FW	Nicolly Manuel	9 May 2010 (aged 16)			(Brazilian Football Confederation) Flamengo
10	MF	Helena	19 September 2009 (aged 17)			(Brazilian Football Confederation) São Paulo
11	FW	Sofia Gamonal	16 July 2010 (aged 16)			(Brazilian Football Confederation) São Paulo
12	GK	Isa Dossena	6 January 2010 (aged 16)			(Brazilian Football Confederation) Ferroviária
13	FW	Greise Kelly	25 July 2010 (aged 16)			(Brazilian Football Confederation) Ferroviária
14	FW	Laura Dupont	19 October 2009 (aged 16)			(Brazilian Football Confederation) Grêmio
15	DF	Marcela Bontorim	12 May 2011 (aged 15)			(Brazilian Football Confederation) Ferroviária
16	FW	Nany	8 March 2010 (aged 16)			(Brazilian Football Confederation) Ferroviária
17	MF	Pepe	14 April 2009 (aged 17)			(Brazilian Football Confederation) Corinthians
18	DF	Leticia Pinho	17 September 2010 (aged 16)			(Brazilian Football Confederation) Flamengo
19	DF	Kaillany Ranifah	30 November 2009 (aged 16)			(Brazilian Football Confederation) Corinthians
20	MF	Indy	2 September 2009 (aged 17)			(Danish Football Association) Nordsjælland
21	GK	Andressa	20 April 2009 (aged 17)			(Brazilian Football Confederation) São Paulo

=== Canada ===
The final squad was announced on 29 September 2026.

Head coach: (England) Jen Herst

No.	Pos.	Player	Date of birth (age)	Caps	Goals	Club
1	GK	Kellyane Dumas	27 February 2009 (aged 17)			(United States Soccer Federation) Vanderbilt University
2	DF	Adri Giese	4 April 2009 (aged 17)			(Canadian Soccer Association) Vancouver Rise
3	DF	Christ-Mayron Brou	2 July 2010 (aged 16)			(Canadian Soccer Association) Montreal Roses
4	DF	Paige Rueffer	26 July 2009 (aged 17)			(Canadian Soccer Association) AFC Toronto
5	DF	Proulx Elizabeth	2 April 2009 (aged 17)			(Canadian Soccer Association) CF Montréal
6	MF	Chloe Scicchitano	4 October 2009 (aged 17)			(Canadian Soccer Association) CF Montréal
7	FW	Lacey Kindel	27 September 2009 (aged 17)			(United States Soccer Federation) Michigan State University
8	MF	Isabella Lanzillotta	30 June 2010 (aged 16)			(Canadian Soccer Association) AFC Toronto
9	FW	Reed Tingley	3 September 2009 (aged 17)			(United States Soccer Federation) Concorde Fire
10	FW	Gabriela Istocki	25 July 2009 (aged 17)			(Canadian Soccer Association) AFC Toronto
11	FW	Alexis Melyna	15 November 2009 (aged 16)			(Canadian Soccer Association) Montreal Roses
12	DF	Iris Oppong	12 May 2009 (aged 17)			(Canadian Soccer Association) AFC Toronto
13	MF	Brady Burtnett	5 February 2009 (aged 17)			(United States Soccer Federation) North Texas SC
14	DF	Laure Langlois	16 July 2010 (aged 16)			(Canadian Soccer Association) CF Montréal
15	MF	Harjanat Boora	18 December 2010 (aged 15)			(Canadian Soccer Association) Vancouver Rise
16	FW	Ailish Hennessy	23 January 2009 (aged 17)			(Canadian Soccer Association) AFC Toronto
17	MF	Brooklyn Schwartzberg	20 April 2010 (aged 16)			(United States Soccer Federation) Legends
18	GK	Megan Lemieux	26 May 2010 (aged 16)			(Canadian Soccer Association) CF Montréal
19	FW	Brooklyn Boldt	3 April 2010 (aged 16)			(Canadian Soccer Association) Vancouver Rise
20	MF	Adalyn Fairweather	12 March 2010 (aged 16)			(Canadian Soccer Association) Vancouver Rise
21	GK	Samantha Powell	2 July 2009 (aged 17)			(United States Soccer Federation) Michigan State University

=== Ghana ===
The final squad was announced on 15 October 2026.

Head coach: Joe Nana Adarkwa

No.	Pos.	Player	Date of birth (age)	Caps	Goals	Club
1	GK	Belinda Maku Aklie	1 June 2010 (aged 16)			(Ghana Football Association) Cabfix Ladies
2	DF	Rafia Osman	10 June 2009 (aged 17)			(Ghana Football Association) Tamale Super Ladies
3	DF	Hajara Adam	12 September 2009 (aged 17)			(Ghana Football Association) Tamale Super Ladies
4	MF	Latifa Musah	25 July 2009 (aged 17)			(Ghana Football Association) Sissamba Ladies
5	DF	Sarafina Essinam	3 September 2010 (aged 16)			(Ghana Football Association) Hearts of Oak
6	FW	Jessica Appiah	7 December 2009 (aged 16)			(Ghana Football Association) Epiphany Warriors
7	FW	Gloria Ameaa	17 March 2010 (aged 16)			(Ghana Football Association) Ampem Darkoa
8	MF	Zeinab Shani	9 November 2009 (aged 16)			(Ghana Football Association) Savannah Ladies
9	FW	Priscilla Mensah	7 April 2009 (aged 17)			(Ghana Football Association) Sissamba Ladies
10	MF	Seidatu Wahab	10 February 2010 (aged 16)			(Ghana Football Association) Hearts of Oak
11	MF	Sekinatu Amadu	13 November 2009 (aged 16)			(Ghana Football Association) Jonina Football Academy Ladies
12	MF	Benedicta Danso	3 March 2011 (aged 15)			(Ghana Football Association) KAC Ladies
13	FW	Cynthia Obinsrewuo	3 July 2009 (aged 17)			(Ghana Football Association) Police Ladies
14	FW	Christiana Ashiaku	6 May 2012 (aged 14)			(Ghana Football Association) Rootz Sistaz
15	MF	Mavis Koah	24 April 2012 (aged 14)			(Ghana Football Association) Rootz Sistaz
16	GK	Josephine Nyafule	24 March 2011 (aged 15)			(Ghana Football Association) Fosu Royal Ladies
17	FW	Linda Achiaa	26 December 2009 (aged 16)			(Ghana Football Association) Army Ladies Football Club
18	DF	Juliana Gyekyewaa	26 January 2009 (aged 17)			(Ghana Football Association) Rootz Sistaz
19	MF	Belinda Kpentey	25 August 2012 (aged 14)			(Ghana Football Association) Rootz Sistaz
20	DF	Matilda Abu Bonsra	2 August 2009 (aged 17)			(Ghana Football Association) Arm of God Ladies
21	GK	Rahima Napari	27 November 2009 (aged 16)			(Ghana Football Association) Northern Ladies

=== Norway ===
A preliminary 28-player squad was announced on 25 August 2026. The final squad was announced on 10 September 2026.

Head coach: Elise Brotangen

No.	Pos.	Player	Date of birth (age)	Club
1	GK	Erla Braathen	1 March 2009 (aged 17)	(Norwegian Football Federation) Hønefoss
2	DF	Ragna Marie Thorleifsson	10 November 2010 (aged 15)	(Norwegian Football Federation) Stabæk
3	DF	Vilde Riis Vinje	22 March 2009 (aged 17)	(Norwegian Football Federation) Odd
4	DF	Isa Bekken Lund	14 September 2009 (aged 17)	(Norwegian Football Federation) Arna-Bjørnar
5	DF	Selma Igesund Saga	6 July 2009 (aged 17)	(Italian Football Federation) Como
6	MF	Isabella Sara Lepore	26 February 2009 (aged 17)	(Norwegian Football Federation) LSK Kvinner
7	MF	Jenny Henriette Storsletten	26 January 2009 (aged 17)	(Norwegian Football Federation) Bodø/Glimt
8	MF	Stine Ariell Klæboe-Solemdal	18 March 2010 (aged 16)	(Norwegian Football Federation) Stabæk
9	FW	Hanne Aarrestad Nesse	22 June 2009 (aged 17)	(Norwegian Football Federation) Bryne
10	FW	Mie Ingeborg Hoem	9 August 2009 (aged 17)	(Norwegian Football Federation) Stabæk
11	FW	Maia Melgård	21 March 2009 (aged 17)	(Norwegian Football Federation) Lyn
12	GK	Helene Olsson	1 April 2009 (aged 17)	(Norwegian Football Federation) Arna-Bjørnar
13	DF	Mari Alnes Bersås	19 March 2010 (aged 16)	(Norwegian Football Federation) Molde
14	DF	Mia Soe Reinhardt	11 April 2009 (aged 17)	(Norwegian Football Federation) Haugesund
15	MF	Sofia Eugenie Mendelin-Norebø	1 December 2009 (aged 16)	(Norwegian Football Federation) LSK Kvinner
16	MF	Elisa Berisha	22 January 2009 (aged 17)	(Norwegian Football Federation) Røa
17	FW	Diana Wilson Kumi	8 January 2010 (aged 16)	(Norwegian Football Federation) Åsane
18	DF	Lina Mørch	6 February 2009 (aged 17)	(Norwegian Football Federation) Øvrevoll Hosle
19	FW	Johanna Fedeler	2 August 2009 (aged 17)	(Norwegian Football Federation) Start
20	DF	Elise Christine Juul Hovland	15 December 2009 (aged 16)	(Norwegian Football Federation) Lyn
21	GK	Mille Viken	21 May 2009 (aged 17)	(Norwegian Football Federation) Stabæk

== Group D ==
=== France ===
The final squad was announced on 1 October 2026.

Head coach: Franck Plenecassagne

No.	Pos.	Player	Date of birth (age)	Caps	Goals	Club
1	GK	Clelia Ducreux	19 August 2009 (aged 17)			(French Football Federation) Paris FC
2	DF	Emma Motyka	1 April 2009 (aged 17)			(French Football Federation) OL Lyonnes
3	DF	Mayra Ferreira	12 July 2009 (aged 17)			(French Football Federation) Toulouse
4	DF	Melissa Esdras	14 March 2009 (aged 17)			(French Football Federation) Paris Saint-Germain
5	DF	Paris Daramola	12 October 2009 (aged 17)			(French Football Federation) Paris Saint-Germain
6	MF	Lisa Mabilon	7 September 2009 (aged 17)			(French Football Federation) Montpellier
7	MF	Lea Motyka	1 April 2009 (aged 17)			(French Football Federation) OL Lyonnes
8	MF	Dienebou Niakate	1 March 2009 (aged 17)			(French Football Federation) Paris Saint-Germain
9	FW	Margot Collin	12 June 2009 (aged 17)			(French Football Federation) Le Havre
10	FW	Mehisane Zidi	6 April 2009 (aged 17)			(French Football Federation) OL Lyonnes
11	MF	Elsa Prezelin	13 November 2009 (aged 16)			(French Football Federation) Nantes
12	MF	Elise Dhalluin	22 May 2009 (aged 17)			(French Football Federation) Lille
13	DF	Angeline Girardot	13 May 2009 (aged 17)			(French Football Federation) Marseille
14	MF	Sharlie Yerro	7 February 2009 (aged 17)			(French Football Federation) Paris FC
15	DF	Rosie Olando	23 January 2009 (aged 17)			(French Football Federation) OL Lyonnes
16	GK	Garance Dekyndt	26 August 2009 (aged 17)			(French Football Federation) Le Havre
17	MF	Maelys Ane	20 March 2009 (aged 17)			(French Football Federation) OL Lyonnes
18	FW	Candice Thomas	6 April 2009 (aged 17)			(French Football Federation) Paris Saint-Germain
19	DF	Noelie Chovin	27 August 2009 (aged 17)			(French Football Federation) Saint-Étienne
20	MF	Gloria Bekoundou	25 February 2009 (aged 17)			(French Football Federation) OL Lyonnes
21	GK	Maelys Minervi	30 June 2009 (aged 17)			(French Football Federation) Marseille

=== Japan ===
The final squad was announced on 25 September 2026. On 6 October 2026, Misato Maeda was withdrawn due to injury and replaced by Himari Nishi.

Head coach: Sadayoshi Shirai

No.	Pos.	Player	Date of birth (age)	Club
1	GK	Mikan Yamanaka	5 January 2010 (aged 16)	(Japan Football Association) Fujieda Junshin High School
2	DF	Wara Shimizu	21 February 2009 (aged 17)	(Japan Football Association) Nojima Stella Kanagawa Sagamihara
3	DF	Anri Ito	13 March 2010 (aged 16)	(Japan Football Association) JFA Academy Fukushima
4	DF	Honoka Yotsumoto	4 July 2009 (aged 17)	(Japan Football Association) Cerezo Osaka Yanmar
5	DF	Himari Nishi	25 August 2009 (aged 17)	(Japan Football Association) JFA Academy Fukushima
6	DF	Sana Morota	20 October 2010 (aged 15)	(Japan Football Association) Tokyo Verdy Menina
7	MF	Rara Higuchi	11 January 2009 (aged 17)	(Japan Football Association) Mynavi Sendai
8	MF	Harura Matsushita	16 November 2009 (aged 16)	(Japan Football Association) JFA Academy Fukushima
9	MF	Yuka Kishida	5 February 2009 (aged 17)	(Japan Football Association) INAC Kobe Leonessa
10	MF	Fuki Ito	3 May 2010 (aged 16)	(Japan Football Association) Tokyo Verdy Menina
11	DF	Asuka Tanaka	31 May 2010 (aged 16)	(Japan Football Association) JFA Academy Fukushima
12	GK	Riruha Wakatsuki	3 July 2009 (aged 17)	(Japan Football Association) JFA Academy Fukushima
13	MF	Runa Sumiya	9 May 2009 (aged 17)	(Japan Football Association) JEF United Chiba
14	FW	Mei Hanashiro	23 June 2009 (aged 17)	(Japan Football Association) JFA Academy Fukushima
15	DF	Keiko Kitajima	26 February 2010 (aged 16)	(Japan Football Association) JFA Academy Fukushima
16	DF	Sayana Oshita	30 June 2009 (aged 17)	(Japan Football Association) Yanagigaura High School
17	MF	Arisu Ota	25 April 2009 (aged 17)	(Japan Football Association) INAC Kobe Leonessa
18	MF	Mashiro Yamaji	31 January 2011 (aged 15)	(Japan Football Association) JFA Academy Fukushima
19	MF	Kotone Sato	10 February 2009 (aged 17)	(Japan Football Association) Vonds Ichihara
20	MF	Nanami Kurita	24 March 2010 (aged 16)	(Japan Football Association) Tokyo Verdy Menina
21	GK	Kou Kadowaki	10 February 2011 (aged 15)	(Japan Football Association) Tokyo Verdy Menina

=== Venezuela ===
Head coach: Dayana Frías

No.	Pos.	Player	Date of birth (age)	Club
1	GK	Gabriela Fermín	18 April 2009 (aged 17)	(Peruvian Football Federation) Deportivo Municipal
2	DF	Mariángeles Ávila	24 July 2010 (aged 16)	(Venezuelan Football Federation) ADIFFEM
3	DF	Karla Alfonzo	20 August 2009 (aged 17)	(Venezuelan Football Federation) ForTalent
4	DF	Dariana Medina	27 July 2011 (aged 15)	(Venezuelan Football Federation) Caracas
5	MF	Migleydys Bolsegui	18 May 2009 (aged 17)	(Venezuelan Football Federation) Carabobo
6	DF	Abril Alejo	7 December 2011 (aged 14)	(Venezuelan Football Federation) Yurubí
7	MF	Juneski Flores	23 February 2009 (aged 17)	(Venezuelan Football Federation) Seca
8	MF	Astrid Granadillo	21 October 2009 (aged 16)	(Venezuelan Football Federation) Caracas
9	FW	Diana Bravo	7 December 2009 (aged 16)	(Venezuelan Football Federation) ADIFFEM
10	FW	Andrea Suárez	3 January 2009 (aged 17)	(Venezuelan Football Federation) Madeira Club Lara
11	FW	Orliany Durán	8 August 2009 (aged 17)	(Venezuelan Football Federation) ADIFFEM
12	GK	Valeria Rebanales	25 August 2009 (aged 17)	(Venezuelan Football Federation) Caracas
13	DF	Diana Molina	15 January 2009 (aged 17)	(Venezuelan Football Federation) Carabobo
14	MF	Ariana Ojeda	25 April 2011 (aged 15)	(Venezuelan Football Federation) Deportivo Margarita
15	DF	Antonella Carmona	31 January 2011 (aged 15)	(Venezuelan Football Federation) Caracas
16	DF	Valery Núñez	27 February 2009 (aged 17)	(Venezuelan Football Federation) Caracas
17	FW	Anabella Figueredo	19 April 2010 (aged 16)	(Venezuelan Football Federation) Seca
18	MF	Constanza Martins	4 February 2011 (aged 15)	(Venezuelan Football Federation) Deportivo Miranda
19	MF	Natalia Bermúdez	21 October 2009 (aged 16)	(Football Federation of Chile) Universidad Católica
20	FW	Mara Briceño	21 January 2011 (aged 15)	(Venezuelan Football Federation) ADIFFEM
21	GK	Roxandrys Torres	2 August 2011 (aged 15)	(Venezuelan Football Federation) Madeira Club Lara

=== Zambia ===
A preliminary 35-player squad was announced on 16 September 2026. The final squad was announced on 4 October 2026.

Head coach: Carol Kanyemba

No.	Pos.	Player	Date of birth (age)	Club
1	GK	Winfridah Mutale	20 July 2011 (aged 15)	(Football Association of Zambia) Elite LFC
2	DF	Gift Mazimba	26 June 2010 (aged 16)	(Football Association of Zambia) Elite LFC
3	DF	Ethel Njobvu	4 May 2011 (aged 15)	(Football Association of Zambia) Green Buffaloes
4	MF	Dorcas Mulosha	7 August 2011 (aged 15)	(Football Association of Zambia) Candice Girls
5	DF	Susan Mulungwa	1 November 2011 (aged 14)	(Football Association of Zambia) Green Eagles
6	FW	Grace Phiri	28 March 2009 (aged 17)	(Football Association of Zambia) Indeni Roses
7	MF	Lilian Namalambo Mwenda	18 September 2009 (aged 17)	(Football Association of Zambia) Elite LFC
8	FW	Beatrice Njobvu	4 October 2010 (aged 16)	(Football Association of Zambia) Red Arrows
9	FW	Faith Kajiya Kapilingo	21 December 2010 (aged 15)	(Football Association of Zambia) Elite LFC
10	FW	Prodia Mwiinga	26 April 2010 (aged 16)	(Football Association of Zambia) Choma Warriors Academy
11	FW	Elizabeth Mofya	23 January 2009 (aged 17)	(Football Association of Zambia) Green Buffaloes
12	MF	Faith Kaunda	22 October 2010 (aged 15)	(Football Association of Zambia) ZedPro Foundation
13	MF	Agness Mwaka	4 November 2010 (aged 15)	(Football Association of Zambia) Elite LFC
14	MF	Jessica Cholwe Johnson	3 July 2009 (aged 17)	(The Football Association) Aston Villa
15	MF	Precious Mwewa	22 November 2009 (aged 16)	(Football Association of Zambia) Candice Girls
16	GK	Bukata Kakumbi	24 April 2009 (aged 17)	(Football Association of Zambia) Police Dove Queens
17	MF	Taonga Mubanga	20 December 2009 (aged 16)	(Football Association of Zambia) Yasa Queens
18	GK	Descent Mbewe	16 January 2010 (aged 16)	(Football Association of Zambia) National Assembly
19	DF	Esther Ngabwe	14 August 2009 (aged 17)	(Football Association of Zambia) Elite LFC
20	MF	Veronica Misozi Phiri	9 April 2010 (aged 16)	(Football Association of Zambia) Yasa Queens
21	FW	Phidah Muzuwa	26 August 2011 (aged 15)	(Football Association of Zambia) Elite LFC

== Group E ==
=== China ===
Head coach: Ma Xiaoxu

No.	Pos.	Player	Date of birth (age)	Caps	Goals	Club
1	GK	Ziqi Niu	2 June 2009 (aged 17)			(Chinese Football Association) Shandong Jinghua
2	DF	Jingjie Deng	17 February 2009 (aged 17)			(Chinese Football Association) Sichuan
3	DF	Yuchen Liu	12 May 2010 (aged 16)			(Chinese Football Association) Sichuan
4	DF	Yuxuan Yang	17 May 2010 (aged 16)			(Chinese Football Association) Suzhou Taihu
5	DF	Xinlin Cai	18 May 2009 (aged 17)			(Chinese Football Association) Shanghai Shengli Football Club
6	MF	Xiaotang Xu	4 January 2010 (aged 16)			(Chinese Football Association) Suzhou Taihu
7	MF	Yuhan Yang	19 March 2010 (aged 16)			(Chinese Football Association) Shanghai Shengli Football Club
8	MF	Lan Yang	3 July 2010 (aged 16)			(Chinese Football Association) Sichuan
9	MF	Hanruo He	1 January 2009 (aged 17)			(Chinese Football Association) Suzhou Taihu
10	MF	Siqing Zhao	1 March 2009 (aged 17)			(Chinese Football Association) Suzhou Taihu
11	FW	Yuxi Liu	12 May 2010 (aged 16)			(Chinese Football Association) Sichuan
12	GK	Shuiling Bai	19 October 2009 (aged 16)			(Chinese Football Association) Shanghai Shengli Football Club
13	MF	Wandi Cheng	6 November 2009 (aged 16)			(Chinese Football Association) Shanghai Shengli Football Club
14	DF	Yaqi Li	4 March 2009 (aged 17)			(Chinese Football Association) Sichuan
15	GK	Qianna Yu	8 March 2009 (aged 17)			(Chinese Football Association) Yancheng Football Center
16	MF	Cuiping Hu	19 June 2009 (aged 17)			(Chinese Football Association) Shenzhen 2028
17	DF	Yuke Liu	5 February 2010 (aged 16)			(Chinese Football Association) Guangzhou Yangcheng Football Center
18	FW	Yichen Wu	18 March 2010 (aged 16)			(Chinese Football Association) Nanjing Football School
19	FW	Zhenzhu Fang	19 January 2009 (aged 17)			(Chinese Football Association) Shenzhen 2028
20	DF	Jiayl Zhao	8 January 2009 (aged 17)			(Chinese Football Association) Shaanxi Zhidan
21	DF	Yue Xu	7 April 2010 (aged 16)			(Chinese Football Association) Shanghai Shengli Football Club

=== Kenya ===
A preliminary 30-player squad was announced on 8 September 2026.

Head coach: Mildred Cheche

No.	Pos.	Player	Date of birth (age)	Club
1	GK	Mishel Okoyo	17 April 2010 (aged 16)	(Football Kenya Federation) Wiyeta Queens
2	DF	Ruth Mulongo Barasa	9 April 2009 (aged 17)	(Football Kenya Federation) Wiyeta Queens
3	FW	Joan Agola Orwa	20 May 2010 (aged 16)	(Football Kenya Federation) Butere Girls
4	DF	Daisy Adongo Obuya	23 April 2010 (aged 16)	(Football Kenya Federation) Gideons Starlets
5	FW	Peninah Okoth Fostine	6 March 2011 (aged 15)	(Football Kenya Federation) Butere Girls
6	MF	Gaudancia Maloba	20 August 2009 (aged 17)	(Football Kenya Federation) Lwak Girls
7	FW	Elizabeth Alizeba Opiyo	7 August 2010 (aged 16)	(Football Kenya Federation) Onding JSS Girls
8	MF	Lindey Weey Atieno	12 April 2009 (aged 17)	(Football Kenya Federation) Sunower Academy
9	FW	Brenda Achieng	28 July 2010 (aged 16)	(Football Kenya Federation) Kakamega School
10	MF	Fleviah Selestine Khatenje	3 June 2010 (aged 16)	(Football Kenya Federation) The Royal Panthers
11	MF	Mwanakombo Nlela Bakari	7 June 2009 (aged 17)	(Football Kenya Federation) Kombani Queens
12	DF	Grace Mumo Mwendwa	24 December 2009 (aged 16)	(Football Kenya Federation) Madira Soccer Assassins
13	DF	Pauline Sylivia Namisi	20 January 2011 (aged 15)	(Football Kenya Federation) Desert Scorpions WFC
14	MF	Tabitha Wambui	12 January 2010 (aged 16)	(Football Kenya Federation) Madira Soccer Assassins
15	DF	Bevarline Awuor Otieno	27 February 2009 (aged 17)	(Football Kenya Federation) Mathare United
16	GK	Vallary Achieng Odhiambo	16 March 2010 (aged 16)	(Football Kenya Federation) Nyakach Girls
17	FW	Emilly Adhiambo Mbuya	26 June 2010 (aged 16)	(Football Kenya Federation) Nyakach Girls
18	GK	Martha Michell Wekhomba	10 August 2010 (aged 16)	(Football Kenya Federation) Nasokol Queens
19	MF	Noelina Akuku	29 November 2010 (aged 15)	(Football Kenya Federation) Butere Girls
20	MF	Brenda Awuor	25 November 2009 (aged 16)	(Football Kenya Federation) Madira Soccer Assassins
21	MF	Beryl Awuor Okumu	10 May 2009 (aged 17)	(Football Kenya Federation) Nyakach Girls

=== Samoa ===
Head coach: (Germany) Juan José Chang

No.	Pos.	Player	Date of birth (age)	Club
1	GK	Susahna Peacock	6 February 2010 (aged 16)	(Football Australia) Blacktown Spartans
2	MF	Cali Ann Willis	24 June 2009 (aged 17)	(United States Soccer Federation) LFC International Academy
3	DF	Amaija Elisapeta George	24 February 2011 (aged 15)	(United States Soccer Federation) La Roca
4	FW	Brooklyn Viola Leaupepe-Nickel	11 October 2010 (aged 16)	(New Zealand Football) Auckland United
5	MF	Taimane Corabelle Devoux	7 July 2010 (aged 16)	Unattached
6	DF	Breanna Tiamane Dawn Kitiona	9 January 2009 (aged 17)	(United States Soccer Federation) Ajax Utah
7	DF	Micayla-Jane Sialoau Elika	14 September 2009 (aged 17)	Unattached
8	MF	Isela Maselina Laban	30 November 2009 (aged 16)	Unattached
9	FW	Tovah Teuila Auva'a	13 October 2011 (aged 15)	(United States Soccer Federation) Phoenix Rising
10	MF	Brooklyn Madison Leilua	23 March 2011 (aged 15)	(United States Soccer Federation) LA Surf
11	FW	Kennedy Anne Corkin	25 December 2009 (aged 16)	Unattached
12	GK	Foaiina Rachael Malae	8 June 2011 (aged 15)	(Football Federation Samoa) Vaivase-Tai
13	FW	Jayde Fetuao Alohamai Eldredge Sagapolutele	6 March 2009 (aged 17)	(United States Soccer Federation) Leahi SC
14	DF	Jazz Lucia Sutherland	14 September 2010 (aged 16)	Unattached
15	DF	Makeli Michelle Leonard	1 June 2009 (aged 17)	(United States Soccer Federation) LAFC So Cal Youth
16	DF	Selei Aina Misa	18 May 2011 (aged 15)	(United States Soccer Federation) Cordova Lancers
17	DF	Isabella Amber Hi'ilani Sibbett	6 February 2011 (aged 15)	Unattached
18	DF	Taliyah Mae Lori Taaga	11 June 2011 (aged 15)	(United States Soccer Federation) Leahi SC
19	DF	Adesina Tetoafaiga Afereti	20 September 2011 (aged 15)	(Football Australia) SD Raiders
20	GK	Peytton-Jo Poutalie Visan	29 May 2012 (aged 14)	(Football Australia) Eastern Suburbs
21	DF	Reyna Litia Tufuga	19 December 2009 (aged 16)	(United States Soccer Federation) Beach FC

=== United States ===
The final squad was announced on 24 September 2026.

Head coach: Ciara Crinion

No.	Pos.	Player	Date of birth (age)	Caps	Goals	Club
1	GK	Avellina Saunders	1 December 2010 (aged 15)	6	0	(United States Soccer Federation) Utah Royals FC Arizona
2	DF	Gigi Zuniga	November 12, 2010 (aged 15)	9	0	(United States Soccer Federation) Mountain View Los Altos SC
3	DF	Madeline Maves	16 February 2009 (aged 17)	9	0	(United States Soccer Federation) Crossfire Premier SC
4	DF	Kendra Hansen	4 April 2009 (aged 17)	9	0	(United States Soccer Federation) Pateadores SC
5	DF	Meila Brewer	24 March 2009 (aged 17)	15	1	(United States Soccer Federation) Dallas Trinity FC
6	DF	Anaiah Williams	November 28, 2009 (aged 16)	10	0	(United States Soccer Federation) Eclipse Select SC
7	FW	Maddie DiMaria	16 February 2009 (aged 17)	18	12	(United States Soccer Federation) St. Louis Scott Gallagher SC
8	MF	Loradana Paletta	13 January 2011 (aged 15)	13	5	(United States Soccer Federation) New York City FC
9	FW	Deus Stanislaus	29 January 2009 (aged 17)	12	9	(United States Soccer Federation) UNC
10	MF	Mia Corona	8 February 2009 (aged 17)	9	2	(United States Soccer Federation) UCLA
11	FW	Amari Manning	8 January 2009 (aged 17)	12	6	(United States Soccer Federation) UNC
12	GK	Alexis Fischer	10 February 2009 (aged 17)	3	0	(United States Soccer Federation) Eclipse Select SC
13	DF	Venina Moodie	25 May 2009 (aged 17)	8	0	(United States Soccer Federation) De Anza Force SC
14	FW	Jordyn Sullivan	27 May 2009 (aged 17)	5	0	(United States Soccer Federation) Match Fit Surf Academy
15	DF	Cassie Travers	10 February 2010 (aged 16)	1	0	(United States Soccer Federation) Gotham FC U-18
16	MF	Grace Murray	10 August 2009 (aged 17)	8	1	(United States Soccer Federation) Beach FC
17	FW	Carolina Reyna		5	0	(United States Soccer Federation) FC Westlake
18	MF	Jordyn Heathcock	27 December 2009 (aged 16)	8	1	(United States Soccer Federation) FC Dallas
19	FW	Gianna Hanf	18 October 2009 (aged 16)	9	2	(United States Soccer Federation) Match Fit Surf Academy
20	MF	Isabella Ortiz	8 January 2010 (aged 16)	3	0	(United States Soccer Federation) Florida United SC
21	GK	Kathy Long Capell	31 August 2009 (aged 17)	1	0	(United States Soccer Federation) Crossfire Premier SC

== Group F ==
=== Australia ===
The final squad was announced on 22 September 2026. On 25 September, Theodora Mouithys-Mickalad withdrew from the squad and was replaced by Matilda Diaz-Wadewitz

Head coach: Michael Cooper

No.	Pos.	Player	Date of birth (age)	Caps	Goals	Club
1	GK	Annabelle Croll	7 July 2009 (aged 17)	5	0	(Football Australia) Western Sydney Wanderers
2	DF	Willa Pearson (captain)	24 December 2010 (aged 15)	9	2	(Football Australia) Sydney FC
3	DF	Charlotte Bradshaw	17 April 2009 (aged 17)	6	0	(Football Australia) Western Sydney Wanderers
4	MF	Keira Sarris	24 September 2009 (aged 17)	11	2	(Football Australia) Melbourne City
5	FW	Abbie Puckett	2 June 2009 (aged 17)	6	3	(Football Australia) Sydney FC
6	MF	Frida Karaberis	7 March 2011 (aged 15)	6	1	(Football Australia) Western Sydney Wanderers
7	MF	Claire Corbett	18 February 2010 (aged 16)	10	2	(Football Australia) Sydney FC
8	MF	Kaya Jugovic	23 January 2009 (aged 17)	10	2	(Football Australia) Melbourne City
9	DF	Sienna Calvanese	16 December 2009 (aged 16)	3	3	(Football Australia) Melbourne City
10	FW	Leyla Hussein	29 March 2009 (aged 17)	8	2	(Football Australia) Melbourne Victory
11	FW	Matilda Diaz-Wadewitz	20 May 2009 (aged 17)	6	0	Unattached
12	GK	Alyse Oppedisano	26 February 2009 (aged 17)	4	0	(Football Australia) Sydney FC
13	MF	Maeve Nicholas	3 May 2009 (aged 17)	10	4	(Football Australia) Adelaide United
14	FW	Jada Taylor	31 July 2010 (aged 16)	10	0	(Football Australia) Sydney FC
15	DF	Rubi Sullivan	7 January 2009 (aged 17)	2	1	(Football Australia) Sydney FC
16	DF	Tehya Aspland	7 April 2009 (aged 17)	8	0	(Football Australia) Canberra Olympic
17	DF	Mary dal Broi	5 May 2010 (aged 16)	6	0	(Football Australia) Western Sydney Wanderers
18	GK	Dali Gorr-Burchmore	1 March 2010 (aged 16)	8	0	(Football Australia) Melbourne City
19	DF	Harper Pell	6 March 2010 (aged 16)	4	0	(Football Australia) NWS Spirit
20	DF	Sakura Leong	25 May 2009 (aged 17)	11	1	(Football Australia) Perth Glory
21	FW	Hayley Muir	9 January 2009 (aged 17)	6	2	(Football Australia) Western Sydney Wanderers

=== Chile ===
Head coach: (Ecuador) Vanessa Arauz

No.	Pos.	Player	Date of birth (age)	Caps	Goals	Club
1	GK	Oriana Cristancho	2 October 2009 (aged 17)			(Football Federation of Chile) Universidad de Chile
2	DF	Constanza Sanchez	2 June 2010 (aged 16)			(Football Federation of Chile) Universidad de Chile
3	DF	Maria Paz Valdivieso	15 February 2010 (aged 16)			(Football Federation of Chile) Huachipato
4	DF	Florencia Galvez	7 April 2009 (aged 17)			(Football Federation of Chile) Santiago Wanderers
5	MF	Amparo Abarca	8 August 2009 (aged 17)			(Football Federation of Chile) Universidad Católica
6	MF	Lia Cruz	28 June 2009 (aged 17)			(Football Federation of Chile) Colo-Colo
7	MF	Antonella Martinez	14 September 2009 (aged 17)			(Football Federation of Chile) Universidad Católica
8	MF	Martina Poblete	11 June 2009 (aged 17)			(Football Federation of Chile) Rangers de Talca
9	FW	Catalina Munoz	26 May 2010 (aged 16)			(Football Federation of Chile) Colo-Colo
10	MF	Amaral Farias	8 January 2010 (aged 16)			(Football Federation of Chile) Colo-Colo
11	FW	Kiara Concha	15 July 2009 (aged 17)			(Football Federation of Chile) Universidad de Chile
12	GK	Lia Pena	10 November 2011 (aged 14)			(Football Federation of Chile) Colo-Colo
13	FW	Antonia Crot	19 March 2010 (aged 16)			(Football Federation of Chile) Cobresal
14	MF	Isidora Benavides	31 October 2009 (aged 16)			(Football Federation of Chile) Rangers de Talca
15	DF	Isabel Cabrera	12 May 2009 (aged 17)			(Football Federation of Chile) Colo-Colo
16	FW	Elisa Cornejo	30 August 2011 (aged 15)			(Football Federation of Chile) Universidad Católica
17	DF	Josefa Munita	18 March 2011 (aged 15)			(Football Federation of Chile) Universidad Católica
18	MF	Thiare Vargas	20 August 2011 (aged 15)			(Football Federation of Chile) Puerto Montt
19	FW	Antonella Villagran	28 September 2011 (aged 15)			(Football Federation of Chile) Puerto Montt
20	MF	Valentina Contreras	11 July 2011 (aged 15)			(Football Federation of Chile) Universidad Católica
21	GK	Camila Ojeda	29 August 2010 (aged 16)			(Football Federation of Chile) Puerto Montt

=== Mexico ===
Head coach: Miguel Gamero

No.	Pos.	Player	Date of birth (age)	Club
1	GK	Ania López	29 January 2010 (aged 16)	(United States Soccer Federation) Match Fit Surf
2	DF	Fernanda Monroy	31 March 2009 (aged 17)	(Mexican Football Federation) Toluca
3	DF	Emily Delgado	27 November 2009 (aged 16)	(Mexican Football Federation) Atlas
4	DF	Valeria Figueroa	25 September 2009 (aged 17)	(Mexican Football Federation) Tigres UANL
5	DF	Camila Campos	10 March 2009 (aged 17)	(United States Soccer Federation) Seacoast United
6	MF	Ixchel Uscanga	26 January 2009 (aged 17)	(Mexican Football Federation) Guadalajara
7	FW	Natalia Pérez	19 March 2010 (aged 16)	(Mexican Football Federation) Guadalajara
8	MF	Zoé Sánchez	17 June 2009 (aged 17)	(Mexican Football Federation) Monterrey
9	FW	Mia Urbano	3 March 2009 (aged 17)	(Mexican Football Federation) Guadalajara
10	MF	Citlalli Reyes	6 July 2009 (aged 17)	(United States Soccer Federation) Las Vegas Lights
11	FW	Kemberly García	23 July 2010 (aged 16)	(Mexican Football Federation) Club América
12	GK	Emiley Ríos	18 March 2009 (aged 17)	(Mexican Football Federation) Club Tijuana
13	DF	Vanessa Paredes	2 July 2009 (aged 17)	(Mexican Football Federation) Club América
14	DF	Bethzabeth Barrón	20 February 2010 (aged 16)	(Mexican Football Federation) Guadalajara
15	DF	Araceli Pérez	24 August 2009 (aged 17)	(Mexican Football Federation) Pachuca
16	FW	Shaddai Núñez	8 January 2010 (aged 16)	(Mexican Football Federation) Toluca
17	DF	Bianka Arredondo	10 February 2010 (aged 16)	(Mexican Football Federation) Pachuca
18	MF	Naomi Rojo	17 June 2009 (aged 17)	(Mexican Football Federation) Club Tijuana
19	FW	Nicole Jiménez	21 January 2010 (aged 16)	(French Football Federation) Marseille
20	FW	Natalia Ugalde	24 September 2010 (aged 16)	(Mexican Football Federation) Pumas UNAM
21	GK	Camila Haro	24 February 2009 (aged 17)	(United States Soccer Federation) Legends FC

=== Spain ===
A 24-player preliminary squad was announced on 21 September 2026. The final squad was announced on 2 October 2026.

Head coach: Mila Martínez

No.	Pos.	Player	Date of birth (age)	Club
1	GK	Antía Veiga	9 May 2009 (aged 17)	(Royal Spanish Football Federation) Deportivo de A Coruña
2	DF	Maialen Valladares	20 January 2010 (aged 16)	(Royal Spanish Football Federation) Athletic Bilbao
3	DF	Marta Vega	7 July 2009 (aged 17)	(Royal Spanish Football Federation) Real Madrid
4	DF	Abril Díaz	8 February 2010 (aged 16)	(Royal Spanish Football Federation) Real Madrid
5	DF	Abril Rius	6 April 2009 (aged 17)	(Royal Spanish Football Federation) Barcelona
6	MF	Avril Serrano	16 February 2009 (aged 17)	(Royal Spanish Football Federation) Barcelona
7	FW	Lídia Gibert	19 March 2010 (aged 16)	(Royal Spanish Football Federation) Barcelona
8	MF	Laia Cabetas	6 August 2009 (aged 17)	(Royal Spanish Football Federation) Barcelona
9	FW	Maria Rius	23 February 2010 (aged 16)	(Royal Spanish Football Federation) Barcelona
10	MF	Vera Molina	24 April 2009 (aged 17)	(Royal Spanish Football Federation) Granada
11	FW	Bruna Quintana	12 June 2010 (aged 16)	(Royal Spanish Football Federation) Barcelona
12	MF	Ángela Gálvez	22 June 2010 (aged 16)	(Royal Spanish Football Federation) Atlético Madrid
13	GK	Nuria Carracedo	8 December 2009 (aged 16)	(Royal Spanish Football Federation) Real Madrid
14	FW	Maria Aymerich	14 August 2009 (aged 17)	(Royal Spanish Football Federation) Madrid CFF
15	MF	Carolina Ferrera	20 February 2010 (aged 16)	(Royal Spanish Football Federation) Barcelona
16	MF	Elena Vizuete	19 February 2010 (aged 16)	(Royal Spanish Football Federation) Barcelona
17	FW	Iraia Fernández	26 July 2009 (aged 17)	(Royal Spanish Football Federation) Athletic Bilbao
18	MF	Uzuri Cadenato	26 January 2010 (aged 16)	(Royal Spanish Football Federation) Athletic Bilbao
19	FW	Rocío Elaine De la Cruz	30 March 2009 (aged 17)	(Royal Spanish Football Federation) Atlético Madrid
20	DF	Maddi Martín	11 July 2010 (aged 16)	(Royal Spanish Football Federation) Athletic Bilbao
21	GK	Goiatz Ferraz	11 January 2010 (aged 16)	(Royal Spanish Football Federation) Athletic Bilbao
