= 2024 WAFU Zone B U-17 Girls Cup =

U-17 Coupe féminine UFOA Zone B Ghana 2024

Tournament details
- Host country: Ghana
- City: Prampram
- Dates: 12 – 26 December
- Teams: 5 (from 1 sub-confederation)
- Venue: 1 (in 1 host city)

Final positions
- Champions: Ghana (1st title)
- Runners-up: Nigeria
- Third place: Benin
- Fourth place: Ivory Coast

Tournament statistics
- Matches played: 9
- Goals scored: 40 (4.44 per match)
- Top scorer(s): (Ghana) Christiana Ashiaku (6 goals)
- Best player: (Ghana) Latifa Musah
- Best goalkeeper: (Nigeria) Christiana Uzoma
- All statistics correct as of 29 December 2024.

The 2024 WAFU Zone B U-17 Girls Cup was the inaugural edition of the WAFU Zone B U-17 Girls Cup, the international women's youth football championship contested by the under-17 national teams of the member associations of the West African Football Union Zone B. The tournament took place in Ghana between 12 and 26 December 2024.

== Teams ==
=== Participating nations ===
Six out of seven teams of WAFU zone B member associations confirmed participation in the first edition in Ghana.

Team	App	Last	Best placement in the tournament
Benin	1st	—N/a	debut
Burkina Faso	1st	—N/a	debut
Ghana	1st	—N/a	debut
Ivory Coast	1st	—N/a	debut
Niger	1st	—N/a	debut
Nigeria	1st	—N/a	debut

=== Draw ===
The final draw took place at the WAFU-B headquarters in Abidjan, Ivory Coast, on 29 November 2024 at 9:00 GMT (UTC+0).

Pot 1	Pot 2	Pot 3
Ghana (hosts); Nigeria	Ivory Coast; Benin	Burkina Faso; Niger

After being drawn in group A the Burkina Faso team withdrew.

== Venues ==
In November 2024, WAFU B announced that the GFA Technical Center in Prampram will serve as the host venue.

== Squads ==
Players born before 1 January 2008 were eligible to compete in the tournament.

== Group stage ==
All times are local, GMT (UTC+0)

=== Group A ===
Pos	Team	Pld	W	D	L	GF	GA	GD	Pts	Qualification
1	Ghana (H)	2	2	0	0	7	3	+4	6	Knockout stage
2	Benin	2	0	0	2	3	7	−4	0	Knockout stage

Source: WAFU B
Rules for classification: Group stage tiebreakers
(H) Hosts
12 December 2024
15:00

Ghana	4–1	Benin
Mensah (??); Ashiaku (??)		Gandonou (??)

GFA Technical Center Prampram

14 December 2024
15:00

Ghana	3–2	Benin
Amoafa (??); Mensah (??)		Gandonou (??)

GFA Technical Center Prampram

=== Group B ===
Pos	Team	Pld	W	D	L	GF	GA	GD	Pts	Qualification
1	Nigeria	2	2	0	0	12	2	+10	6	Knockout stage
2	Ivory Coast	2	1	0	1	7	3	+4	3	Knockout stage
3	Niger	2	0	0	2	0	14	−14	0	

Source: WAFU B
Rules for classification: Group stage tiebreakers
12 December 2024
18:00

Nigeria	9–0	Niger
Moshood (??); Akekoromowei (??); Animashaun (??); Effiong (??)

GFA Technical Center Prampram

14 December 2024
18:00

Niger	0–5	Ivory Coast
		N'Guessan (??); Kone (??); Ambeu (??)

GFA Technical Center Prampram

16 December 2024
15:00

Ivory Coast	2–3	Nigeria
Kouame (??); N'Guessan (??)		Harmony (??)

GFA Technical Center Prampram

== Knockout stage ==
In the knockout stage, extra time and penalty shoot-out will be used to decide the winner if necessary.

=== Progression ===
Semi-finals
19 December – GFA Technical Center Prampram
Ghana	5
Ivory Coast	0
19 December – GFA Technical Center Prampram
Nigeria	2
Benin	0

Final
22 December – GFA Technical Center Prampram
Ghana(p)	2(4)
Nigeria	2(2)
Third place
22 December – GFA Technical Center Prampram
Ivory Coast	0(3)
Benin(p)	0(4)

=== Semi-finals ===
19 December 2024
15:00

Ghana	5–0	Ivory Coast
Ashiaku (?); Ayantoya (?); Wahab (?)

GFA Technical Center Prampram
19 December 2024
18:00

Nigeria	2–0	Benin
Nkpa (?); Effiong (?)

GFA Technical Center Prampram

=== Third place match ===
22 December 2024
15:00

Ivory Coast	0–0	Benin
Penalties
	3–4

GFA Technical Center Prampram

=== Final ===
22 December 2024
18:00

Nigeria	2–2	Ghana
Oscar (?); Chidi (?)		Amoafa (?); Mensah (?)
Penalties
	2–4

GFA Technical Center Prampram

== Awards ==
The following awards were given for the tournament:

Best player
(Ghana) Latifa Musah
Topscorer
(Ghana) Christiana Ashiaku
(6 goals)
Goalkeeper of the tournament
(Nigeria) Christiana Uzoma

== Goalscorers ==
There were 40 goals scored in 9 matches, for an average of 4.44 goals per match.

6 goals

- (Ghana) Christiana Ashiaku

4 goals

- (Nigeria) Shakirat Moshood
- (Ivory Coast) Adjoua Rolande N'Guessan
- (Nigeria) Chidi Harmony

3 goals

- (Nigeria) Janet Akekekoromowei
- (Ghana) Gertrude Amoafa
- (Ghana) Priscilla Mensah

2 goals

- (Benin) Yenido Gandonou
- (Nigeria) Peace Effiong

1 goal

- (Nigeria) Aishat Animashaun
- (Nigeria) Mary Nkpa
- (Nigeria) Precious Oscar
- (Ivory Coast) Zea Alimatou Kone
- (Ivory Coast) Awa Ambeu
- (Ivory Coast) Appoh Reine Esther Kouame
- (Benin) Romaine Gandonou
- (Ghana) Zipporah Ayantoya
- (Ghana) Seidatu Wahab
