= WAFU Zone B U-17 Girls Cup =

WAFU B U-17 Girls Cup
- Founded: 2024; 2 years ago
- Region: West Africa
- Teams: 7
- Current champions: Nigeria 1st title
- Most championships: Ghana; Nigeria (1 title each)
- Website: ufoawafub.com
- 2026 WAFU Zone B U-17 Girls Cup

The WAFU Zone B U-17 Girls Cup is an international women's youth football championship competition contested by the under-17 national teams of the member associations of the West African Football Union Zone B. The tournament was inaugurated in 2024 and is held biennially.

The first edition took place from 12 and 26 December 2024 in Prampram, Ghana, with five participating teams.

Nigeria are the tournament's current champions after winning the 2026 tournament.

== Results ==
=== WAFU B U-17 Girls Cup Tournament ===
Ed.	Year	Host	First place game			Third place game		
Ed.	Year	Host	(gold) Champion	Score	(silver) Runner-up	(bronze) Third place	Score	Fourth place
1	2024	Ghana	Ghana	2–2 (4–2 p)	Nigeria	Benin	0–0 (4–3 p)	Ivory Coast
2	2026	Ivory Coast	Nigeria	round-robin	Ghana	Burkina Faso	round-robin	Ivory Coast

== Statistics ==
=== Summary ===
Team	Winners	Runners-up	Third place	Fourth place
Ghana	1 (2024*)	1 (2026)	—	—
Nigeria	1 (2026)	1 (2024)	—	—
Benin	—	—	1 (2024)	
Burkina Faso	—	—	1 (2026)	
Ivory Coast	—	—	—	2 (2024, 2026*)

* Hosts

=== Participating nations ===
Team	(Ghana) 2024	(Ivory Coast) 2026	Apps.
Benin	3rd	×	1
Burkina Faso	×	3rd	1
Ghana	1st	2nd	2
Ivory Coast	4th	4th	2
Niger	GS	6th	2
Nigeria	2nd	1st	2
Togo	×	5th	1

- 1st – Champions
- 2nd – Runners-up
- 3rd – Third place
- 4th – Fourth place
- 5th – Fifth place
- 6th – Sixth place
- GS – Group stage
- Q – Qualified for upcoming tournament
- — Hosts
- × — Did not enter / Withdrew / Banned

== See also ==
- WAFU Zone B U20 Women's Cup
- WAFU Zone B Women's Cup
