= Kemi Adegbuyi =

Nigerian female professional footballer

Personal information
- Place of birth: Nigeria
- Date of death: 2010
- Position: Forward

Team information
- Current team: Edo Queens
- Number: 14
Medal record
Women's football
Representing Nigeria
FIFA U-17 Women's World Cup
Winner	2026 Morocco

Oluwakemi Adegbuyi (born 2010) is a Nigerian professional footballer who plays as a forward or midfielder. she plays domestically in the Nigeria Women Football League (NWFL) for FC Robo Queens Lagos before she was later signed by Edo Queens. She was nominated by CAF for Women's Young Player of the Year category. She represented the Nigeria national under-17 team during the 2026 FIFA U-17 Women's World Cup in Morocco.

== Career ==
Adegbuyi began her senior club career with Lagos-based side FC Robo Queens. During the 2025/26 NWFL Premiership season and was later transferred to NWFL champions Edo Queens in August 2026.she won the NWFL Premiership Player of the Season for the 2025/2026 Season, and she participated in the 2026 WAFU Zone B U-17 Girls Cup and awarded with the player of the tournament.

== Honours ==
- NWFL Premiership Player of the Season for the 2025/2026.
- WAFU-B Player of the Tournament award.
- Nomination Caf Young Player of the Year category.
- 2026 FIFA U-17 Women's World Cup.
