= Awawu Bashiru =

Nigerian footballer (born 2010)

Personal information
- Date of birth: 30 March 2010 (age 16)
- Place of birth: Nigeria
- Position: Attacking midfielder

International career
Years	Team	Apps	(Gls)
- Nigeria U17
Medal record
Women's football
Representing Nigeria
FIFA U-17 Women's World Cup
Winner	2026 Morocco

Awawu Bashiru (born 30 March 2010) is a Nigerian professional footballer who plays as an attacking midfielder. She represented the Nigeria national under-17 team during the 2026 FIFA U-17 Women's World Cup.

== International career ==
Bashiru was born in Nigeria. She rose through the ranks of youth football before playing for the youth national team. She earned a selection for Nigeria's squad heading to the 2026 FIFA U-17 Women's World Cup hosted in Morocco.

== Honours ==
Nigeria U17

- FIFA U-17 Women's World Cup: 2026
- WAFU Zone B U-17 Girls Cup: 2026
