= Burkina Faso women's national under-17 football team =

Burkina Faso women's U-17
- Association: Burkinabé Football Federation
- Confederation: CAF
- Sub-confederation: WAFU (West Africa)
- FIFA code: BFA
First colours	Second colours

First international
- Burkina Faso 4–1 Guinea (Bamako, Mali; 4 February 2024)

Biggest win
- Burkina Faso 4–1 Guinea (Bamako, Mali; 4 February 2024)

African U-17 Women's World Cup qualification
- Appearances: 2 (first in 2024)
- Best result: Round 3 (2024)

FIFA U-17 Women's World Cup
- Appearances: None

Burkina Faso women's national under-17 football team is a youth association football team operated under the auspices of Burkinabé Football Federation. Its primary role is the development of players in preparation for the senior Burkina Faso women's national football team.

== Competitive record ==
=== FIFA U-17 Women's World Cup record ===
FIFA U-17 Women's World Cup
Year	Result	Pld	W	D *	L	GF	GA
(New Zealand) 2008	Did not enter						
(Trinidad and Tobago) 2010	Did not enter						
(Azerbaijan) 2012	Did not enter						
(Costa Rica) 2014	Did not enter						
(Jordan) 2016	Did not enter						
(Uruguay) 2018	Did not enter						
(India) 2022	Did not enter						
(Dominican Republic) 2024	Did not qualify						
(Morocco) 2025	Did not enter						
(Morocco) 2026	Did not qualify						
(Morocco) 2027	TBD						
(Morocco) 2028	TBD						
(Morocco) 2029	TBD						
Total	0/9						

=== African U-17 Cup of Nations for Women record ===
African U-17 Cup of Nations for Women
Year	Round	Position	Pld	W	D	L	GF	GA
2008	Did not enter							
2010	Did not enter							
2012	Did not enter							
2013	Did not enter							
2016	Did not enter							
2018	Did not enter							
2022	Did not enter							
2024	Round 3	9th	4	2	1	1	7	9
2025	Did not enter							
2026	Round 1	32nd	2	1	0	1	3	5
Total	2/9	0 titles	6	3	1	2	10	14

== See also ==
- Burkina Faso women's national football team
- Burkina Faso women's national under-20 football team
