= Oluebube Umejiaku =

Nigerian footballer (born 2010)

Personal information
- Date of birth: 1 May 2010 (age 16)
- Place of birth: Imo, Nigeria
- Height: 1.56 m (5 ft 1 in)
- Position: Forward

Team information
- Current team: Heartland Queens
- Number: 17

Senior career*
Years	Team	Apps	(Gls)
- Heartland Queens

International career
2026–	Nigeria U17		
Medal record
Women's football
Representing Nigeria
FIFA U-17 Women's World Cup
Winner	2026 Morocco
- * Club domestic league appearances and goals

Oluebube Umejiaku (born 1 May 2010) is a Nigerian footballer who plays as a forward for Heartland Queens of the NWFL Premiership.

== Club career ==
During the 2025–26 season, Umejiaku helped Heartland Queens reach the finals of the Nigeria Women's Federation Cup, where they lost to Nasarawa Amazons in the final.

== International career ==
In September 2026, Umejiaku was part of the Nigeria U17 national team that competed at the WAFU Zone B U-17 Girls Cup, where on the final matchday, she scored her only goal in the tournament, in which her team won 4–0 over Togo and secured the championship.

In October 2026, Umejiaku was included in the Nigeria U17 squad for the FIFA U-17 Women's World Cup. During the group stages, she scored her first goal in tournament on 17 October, in a 2–1 loss to Poland, while her next one came on 23 October, in a 3–1 win over North Korea. In the round of 16, she scored her third goal, in a 2–1 win over Mexico. In the final, she scored her fourth and final goal in the tournament, in a 2–1 win over Japan. This resulted in Nigeria winning the FIFA Women's U-17 World Cup for the first time in history, while Umejiaku herself was awarded the Golden Ball.

== Honours ==
Nigeria U17

- FIFA U-17 Women's World Cup: 2026
- WAFU Zone B U-17 Girls Cup: 2026

Individual

- FIFA U-17 Women's World Cup Golden Ball: 2026
