= Lan Yang =

Chinese-born physicist

- Born: China
- Education: University of Science and Technology of China; California Institute of Technology
- Known for: Non-Hermitian photonics, optical sensing, and nanophotonics
- Awards: CAREER Award; Presidential Early Career Awards for Scientists and Engineers (PECASE); OPTICA Fellow; APS Fellow; AAAS Fellow; IEEE Fellow; AIMBE Fellow; National Academy of Inventors (NAI) Fellow
- Scientific career
- Fields: Applied physics Electrical engineering
- Workplaces: Washington University in St. Louis
- Website: https://yanglab.wustl.edu/about-the-pi/

Lan Yang is a Chinese-born physicist specializing in optics.

Lan Yang earned her bachelor's and first master's of science degrees at the University of Science and Technology of China in 1997 and 1999, respectively. She completed a second master's degree in materials science at the California Institute of Technology in 2000, and remained at Caltech to pursue a doctorate in applied physics, which she obtained in 2005. Lan Yang began teaching at the McKelvey School of Engineering at Washington University in St. Louis in 2007, as an assistant professor. She became an associate professor in 2012, then a full professor in 2014, as Edwin H. & Florence G. Skinner Professor in Electrical and Systems Engineering. From January 2019 to December 2024, Lan Yang served as the editor-in-chief of the journal Photonics Research.

Lan Yang received a National Science Foundation CAREER Award in 2010, followed by a Presidential Early Career Award for Scientists and Engineers the next year. She was elected a fellow of the Optical Society in 2017, "for seminal contribution in nanophotonics and photonic sensing." In 2020, the American Physical Society awarded her an equivalent honor, "for seminal contributions to non-Hermitian photonics, optical sensing, and nanophotonics."
