= 2008 African U-17 Women's World Cup qualification =

2008 African U-17 Women's Championship
Tournament details
- Teams: 12 (from 1 confederation)

Final positions
- Champions: Nigeria (1st title)
- Runners-up: Ghana
- Third place: Cameroon

Tournament statistics
- Matches played: 14
- Goals scored: 50 (3.57 per match)

The 2008 African U-17 Women's World Cup qualification was the 1st edition of the African U-17 Women's World Cup qualification, the biennial international youth football competition organised by the Confederation of African Football (CAF) to determine which women's under-17 national teams from Africa qualify for the FIFA U-17 Women's World Cup. Players born on or after 1 January 1991 were eligible to compete in the tournament.

two teams, the winners of the tournament Nigeria and the runners-up Ghana, qualified from this tournament for the 2008 FIFA U-17 Women's World Cup in New Zealand as the CAF representatives.

== Preliminary round ==
Of six match pairings, only two were actually played out.

Team 1	Agg.	Team 2	1st leg	2nd leg
Liberia	w/o^{1}	Benin	—	—
Guinea	0–12	Nigeria	0–5	0–7
Cameroon	w/o^{2}	Namibia	—	—
South Africa	w/o^{3}	Botswana	—	—
Zambia	0–6	Ghana	0–2	0–4
Zimbabwe	w/o^{4}	DR Congo	—	—

- ^{1} Benin withdrew from competition before the start of the 1st leg. As a result, Liberia qualified for the next round.
- ^{2} Namibia withdrew from competition before the start of the 1st leg. As a result, Cameroon qualified for the next round.
- ^{3} Botswana withdrew from competition before the start of the 1st leg. As a result, South Africa qualified for the next round.
- ^{4} DR Congo withdrew from competition before the start of the 1st leg. As a result, Zimbabwe qualified for the next round.

== First round ==
Team 1	Agg.	Team 2	1st leg	2nd leg
Liberia	w/o^{1}	Nigeria	—	—
Cameroon	3–0	South Africa	2–0	1–0
Ghana	11–0	DR Congo	8–0	3–0

- ^{1} Liberia withdrew from competition before the start of the 1st leg. As a result, Nigeria qualified for the next round.

== Second round ==
In the second round a double-round robin was played. After that the top two teams, Nigeria and Ghana, qualified to the 2008 FIFA U-17 Women's World Cup.

Pos	Team	Pld	W	D	L	GF	GA	GD	Pts	Qualification
1	Nigeria	4	2	1	1	8	4	+4	7	2008 FIFA U-17 Women's World Cup
2	Ghana	4	2	0	2	6	7	−1	6	2008 FIFA U-17 Women's World Cup
3	Cameroon	4	1	1	2	4	7	−3	4	

1 June 2008
Cameroon	1–1	Nigeria	Yaounde
6 June 2008
Nigeria	4–2	Ghana	Abuja
14 June 2008
Ghana	1–2	Cameroon	Accra
22 June 2008
Nigeria	3–0	Cameroon	Abuja
28 June 2008
Ghana	1–0	Nigeria	Accra
5 July 2008
Cameroon	1–2	Ghana	Yaounde
