= Ivory Coast women's national under-17 football team =

Ivory Coast women's U-17
- Association: Ivorian Football Federation
- Confederation: CAF (Africa)
- Sub-confederation: WAFU (West Africa)
- FIFA code: CIV
First colours	Second colours

African U-17 Women's World Cup qualification
- Appearances: 1 (first in 2025)
- Best result: Qualified (2025)

FIFA U-17 Women's World Cup
- Appearances: 1 (first in 2025)
- Best result: Group stage (2025)

Ivory Coast women's national under-17 football team is a youth association football team operated under the auspices of the Ivorian Football Federation. Its primary role is the development of players in preparation for the senior Ivory Coast women's national football team.

== Competitive record ==
=== FIFA U-17 Women's World Cup ===
Year	Result	Pld	W	D	L	GF	GA
(New Zealand) 2008	Did not enter						
(Trinidad and Tobago) 2010	Did not enter						
(Azerbaijan) 2012	Did not enter						
(Costa Rica) 2014	Did not enter						
(Jordan) 2016	Did not enter						
(Uruguay) 2018	Did not enter						
(India) 2022	Did not enter						
(Dominican Republic) 2024	Did not enter						
(Morocco) 2025	Group stage	3	0	1	2	1	7
(Morocco) 2026	To be determined						
(Morocco) 2027	To be determined						
(Morocco) 2028	To be determined						
(Morocco) 2029	To be determined						
Total	1/13	3	0	1	2	1	7

== Head-to-head record ==
The following table shows Ivory Coast's head-to-head record in the FIFA U-17 Women's World Cup.

Opponent	Pld	W	D	L	GF	GA	GD	Win %
Colombia	1	0	0	1	0	3	−3	0.00
South Korea	1	0	1	0	1	1	+0	0.00
Spain	1	0	0	1	0	3	−3	0.00
Total	3	0	1	2	1	7	−6	0.00

== See also ==
- Ivory Coast women's national football team
- Ivory Coast women's national under-20 football team
