= 2012 African U-17 Women's World Cup qualification =

2012 African U-17 Women's World Cup Qualifying Tournament
Tournament details
- Teams: 13 (from 1 confederation)

Tournament statistics
- Matches played: 16
- Goals scored: 50 (3.13 per match)

The 2012 African U-17 Women's World Cup Qualifying Tournament was the 3rd edition of the African U-17 Women's World Cup Qualifying Tournament, the biennial international youth football competition organised by the Confederation of African Football (CAF) to determine which women's under-17 national teams from Africa qualify for the FIFA U-17 Women's World Cup.

The tournament was played on a home and away knockout basis. 13 teams entered the competition but due to withdrawals only 11 actually played matches. The top three teams of the tournament Gambia, Ghana and Nigeria qualified for the 2012 FIFA U-17 Women's World Cup in Azerbaijan as the CAF representatives.

== Preliminary round ==
The preliminary round first leg was scheduled to be played on 26 November 2011 in Nairobi, Kenya.

Team 1	Agg.	Team 2	1st leg	2nd leg
Kenya	w/o^{1}	Mozambique	—	—

- ^{1} Mozambique withdrew from competition before the start of the 1st leg. As a result, Kenya qualified for the next round.

== First round ==
The first round was held on 20–22 January 2012 (first leg) and 3–5 February 2012 (second leg).

Team 1	Agg.	Team 2	1st leg	2nd leg
Botswana	1–7	Zambia	1–5	0–2
Kenya	0–5	Nigeria	0–2	0–3
Gambia	4–3	Sierra Leone	3–0	1–3
Guinea	w/o^{1}	Tunisia	—	—
Namibia	1–6	South Africa	1–1	0–5
Cameroon	0–5	Ghana	0–1	0–4

- ^{1} Guinea withdrew from competition before the start of the 1st leg. As a result, Tunisia qualified for the next round.

== Second round ==
The second round was held on 8 and 24 March 2012. The legs of Gambia and Tunisia were played a week later. The three winning teams qualified to the 2012 FIFA U-17 Women's World Cup.

Team 1	Agg.	Team 2	1st leg	2nd leg
Zambia	1–7	Nigeria	1–2	0–5
Gambia	3–1	Tunisia	1–0	2–1
South Africa	1–5	Ghana	0–0	1–5

Nigeria and Ghana qualified for their third time. Gambia's qualification is a first.

== Qualified teams for FIFA U-17 Women's World Cup ==
The following three teams from CAF qualified for the FIFA U-17 Women's World Cup.

Team	Previous appearances in tournament
Gambia	0
Ghana	2 (2008, 2010)
Nigeria	2 (2008, 2010)
