= Nigeria women's national under-17 football team =

National under-17 association football team representing Nigeria

Nigeria Under-17
- Nickname: Flamingoes
- Association: Nigeria Football Federation
- Confederation: CAF (Africa)
- Sub-confederation: WAFU (West Africa)
- Head coach: Akeem Busari
- Home stadium: Agege Stadium, Lagos
- FIFA code: NGA
First colours	Second colours

African U-17 Women's World Cup qualification
- Appearances: 9 (first in 2008)
- Best result: Winners (2008, 2010, 2012, 2013, 2016)

FIFA U-17 Women's World Cup
- Appearances: 9 (first in 2008)
- Best result: Champions (2026)

Nigeria women's national under-17 football team, also nicknamed the Flamingoes is a youth association football team operated under the auspices of Nigeria Football Federation. Its primary role is the development of players in preparation for the senior Nigeria women's national football team. The team competes in the biennial FIFA U-17 Women's World Cup and African U-17 Women's World Cup qualification, which are the top competitions for this age group.

== Results and fixtures ==
Legend

Win Draw Lose Fixture

== Personnel ==
Below is the coaching squad for the 2022 FIFA U-17 Women's World Cup.

Position	Name
Head coach	(Nigeria) Akeem Busari
Assistant coach	(Nigeria) Adanna Gloria Nwaneri
Assistant coach I	(Nigeria) Queendolyn Akpan
Assistant coach II	(Nigeria) Nojimu Morufu Adeyemo
Goalkeeping coach	(Nigeria) Abubakar Ndanusa

== Players ==
=== Current squad ===
The following 21 players were selected for the 2026 FIFA U-17 Women's World Cup.

No.	Pos.	Player	Date of birth (age)	Club
1	GK	Jane Ijirigho	31 August 2009 (aged 17)	(Nigeria Football Federation) Nasarawa Amazons
2	DF	Elizabeth Adesuyi	8 March 2010 (aged 16)	(Nigeria Football Federation) Pacesetter Queens
3	DF	Azeezat Oduntan	10 July 2009 (aged 17)	(Nigeria Football Federation) Robo
4	MF	Muinat Rotimi	25 March 2009 (aged 17)	(Nigeria Football Federation) Nakamura Academy
5	DF	Ohunene Sunday	22 August 2010 (aged 16)	(Nigeria Football Federation) Nasarawa Amazons
6	DF	Pattra Oparanmegwa	7 June 2009 (aged 17)	(Nigeria Football Federation) Bayelsa Queens
7	FW	Queen Joseph	24 November 2009 (aged 16)	(Nigeria Football Federation) Fosla Academy
8	MF	Mary Dunstan	1 November 2010 (aged 15)	(Nigeria Football Federation) Bayelsa Queens
9	FW	Chidera Chidi	21 October 2009 (aged 16)	(Nigeria Football Federation) Bayelsa Queens
10	MF	Favour Nkwocha	27 April 2009 (aged 17)	(Nigeria Football Federation) Robo
11	MF	Awawu Bashiru	30 March 2010 (aged 16)	(Nigeria Football Federation) Confluence Queens
12	MF	Tosin Rafiu	8 June 2010 (aged 16)	(Nigeria Football Federation) Robo
13	DF	Esther Stephen	29 March 2010 (aged 16)	(Nigeria Football Federation) Unication
14	FW	Oluwakemi Adegbuyi	17 March 2010 (aged 16)	(Nigeria Football Federation) Robo
15	MF	Precious Oscar	7 October 2009 (aged 17)	(Nigeria Football Federation) Edo Queens
16	GK	Onyinyechi Opara	16 December 2009 (aged 16)	(Nigeria Football Federation) Delta Queens
17	FW	Oluebube Umejiaku	1 May 2010 (aged 16)	(Nigeria Football Federation) Heartland Queens
18	FW	Sakirat Sarafa	4 July 2009 (aged 17)	(Nigeria Football Federation) Remo Stars
19	DF	Kanyinsola Yusuf	31 January 2010 (aged 16)	(Nigeria Football Federation) Robo
20	MF	Kaosarat Akanji	7 April 2011 (aged 15)	(Nigeria Football Federation) DreamStar Ladies
21	GK	Mercy Felix	26 December 2010 (aged 15)	(Nigeria Football Federation) Obosa FA

== Honours ==
Intercontinental

- FIFA U-17 Women's World Cup
  - (gold) Champions (1): 2026
  - (bronze) Third place (1) : 2022

Continental

- African U-17 Cup of Nations for Women
  - (gold) Champions (9): 2008, 2010, 2012, 2013, 2016, 2022, 2024, 2025, 2026
  - (silver) Runners-up (6) : 2018

== Competitive record ==
The Flamingoes have been to every edition of the FIFA U-17 Women's World Cup missing only the 2018 edition. Before the 2022 edition, they've only gotten as far as the quarterfinals in the 2010, 2012 and 2014 editions respectively. They broke this "jinx" in 2022 by defeating USA in the quarterfinals via penalties after an entertaining and tightly-closed contest during regulation time which ended 1–1. In 2026, they became the first African team to reach the final. They went on to win that final against Japan with a 2-1 score, making them the first African team to win the tournament.

=== FIFA U-17 Women's World Cup ===
Year	Result	Pld	W	D*	L	GF	GA
(New Zealand) 2008	Group stage	3	1	1	1	4	4
(Trinidad and Tobago) 2010	Quarter-finals	4	3	0	1	15	9
(Azerbaijan) 2012	Quarter-finals	4	2	2	0	15	1
(Costa Rica) 2014	Quarter-finals	4	3	0	1	7	5
(Jordan) 2016	Group stage	3	0	1	2	0	4
(Uruguay) 2018	Did not qualify						
(India) 2022	Third place	6	2	3	1	11	7
(Dominican Republic) 2024	Quarter-finals	4	3	0	1	9	3
(Morocco) 2025	Round of 16	4	1	0	3	5	9
(Morocco) 2026	Champions	7	6	0	1	14	6
(Morocco) 2027	To be determined						
(Morocco) 2028	To be determined						
(Morocco) 2029	To be determined						
Total:9/13	1 Title	39	21	7	11	80	48

* Draws include knockout matches decided by penalty shoot-out.

=== African U-17 Women's World Cup qualification ===
Year	Round	Position	Pld	W	D	L	GF	GA
2008	Champions	1st	4	2	1	1	8	4
2010	Qualified for World Cup	1st	2	2	0	0	7	1
2012	Qualified for World Cup	1st	4	4	0	0	12	1
2013	Qualified for World Cup	1st	-	-	-	-	-	-
2016	Qualified for World Cup	1st	4	4	0	0	16	0
2018	Second round	2nd	4	0	4	0	3	3
2022	Qualified for World Cup	1st	4	3	1	0	7	0
2024	Qualified for World Cup	1st	6	5	1	0	25	2
2025	Qualified for World Cup	1st	4	3	1	0	9	1
2026	Qualified for World Cup	1st	4	4	0	0	19	5
Total:10/10	Qualified 9 times for the FIFA U-17 Women's World Cup		36	31	4	1	117	19

== Head-to-head record ==
The following table shows Nigeria's head-to-head record in the FIFA U-17 Women's World Cup.

Opponent	Pld	W	D	L	GF	GA	GD	Win %
Azerbaijan	1	1	0	0	11	0	+11	100.00
Brazil	3	1	1	1	5	4	+1	33.33
Canada	2	0	1	1	2	5	−3	0.00
Chile	2	2	0	0	7	1	+6	100.00
China	1	1	0	0	2	1	+1	100.00
Colombia	3	2	1	0	5	1	+4	66.67
Dominican Republic	1	1	0	0	1	0	+1	100.00
Ecuador	1	1	0	0	4	0	+4	100.00
England	2	0	1	1	0	1	−1	0.00
France	2	0	1	1	0	1	−1	0.00
Germany	2	0	1	1	4	5	−1	0.00
Italy	1	0	0	1	0	4	−4	0.00
Japan	1	1	0	0	2	1	+1	100.00
Mexico	2	2	0	0	5	1	+4	100.00
New Zealand	2	2	0	0	8	1	+7	100.00
North Korea	3	2	0	1	6	6	+0	66.67
Poland	1	0	0	1	1	2	−1	0.00
Puerto Rico	1	1	0	0	2	0	+2	100.00
Samoa	1	1	0	0	4	0	+4	100.00
South Korea	2	1	0	1	7	7	+0	50.00
Spain	1	0	0	1	0	3	−3	0.00
Trinidad and Tobago	1	1	0	0	2	1	+1	100.00
United States	2	0	1	1	1	3	−2	0.00
Venezuela	1	1	0	0	1	0	+1	100.00
Total	39	21	7	11	80	48	+32	53.85

== See also ==
- Nigeria women's national football team
- Nigeria women's national under-20 football team
