= 2026 FIFA U-17 Women's World Cup =

Association football tournament

2026 كأس العالم للسيدات تحت 17 سنة المغرب ⵜⴰⵇⴱⵓⵛⵜ ⵏ ⵓⵎⴰⴹⴰⵍ ⵏ FIFA U17 ⵏ ⵜⵍⴰⵡⵉⵏ ⵏ 2026
- Dreams in the Making

Tournament details
- Host country: Morocco
- Dates: 17 October – 7 November
- Teams: 24 (from 6 confederations)
- Venue: 1 (in 1 host city)

Final positions
- Champions: Nigeria (1st title)
- Runners-up: Japan
- Third place: North Korea
- Fourth place: Brazil

Tournament statistics
- Matches played: 52
- Goals scored: 205 (3.94 per match)
- Attendance: 15,537 (299 per match)
- Top scorer(s): (United States) Maddie DiMaria (12 goals)
- Best player: (Nigeria) Oluebube Umejiaku
- Best goalkeeper: (North Korea) Kim Son-gyong
- Fair play award: Japan

The 2026 FIFA U-17 Women's World Cup (Arabic: كأس العالم للسيدات تحت 17 سنة المغرب 2026, Standard Moroccan Tamazight: ⵜⴰⵇⴱⵓⵛⵜ ⵏ ⵓⵎⴰⴹⴰⵍ ⵏ FIFA U17 ⵏ ⵜⵍⴰⵡⵉⵏ ⵏ 2026) was the tenth edition of the FIFA U-17 Women's World Cup, the international women's youth football championship contested by the under-17 national teams of the member associations of FIFA. It was hosted by Morocco from 17 October to 7 November 2026. This was the second FIFA U-17 Women's World Cup to be held in Africa (The first one also in Morocco in 2025) and Morocco being the second Arab country to host it after Jordan in 2016. This is the second of five consecutive FIFA U-17 Women's World Cups to be held in Morocco, set to be played annually until 2029.

North Korea were the two-time defending champions, having won a record fourth title in 2025, but were eliminated in the semi-final by Japan on penalties. Nigeria won their first ever title defeating Japan in the final becoming the first African country to win a FIFA World Cup title in any FIFA women's tournament age level.

== Host selection ==
Morocco was announced as the 2025–2029 Women's U-17 World Cups host country following the FIFA Council meeting on 14 March 2024 in Zurich, Switzerland.

- Morocco

== Venues ==
Location of the host cities of the 2026 FIFA U-17 Women's World Cup.

- blue Salé

2026 FIFA U-17 Women's World Cup venues
Salé
Mohammed VI Football Academy
(4 pitches)
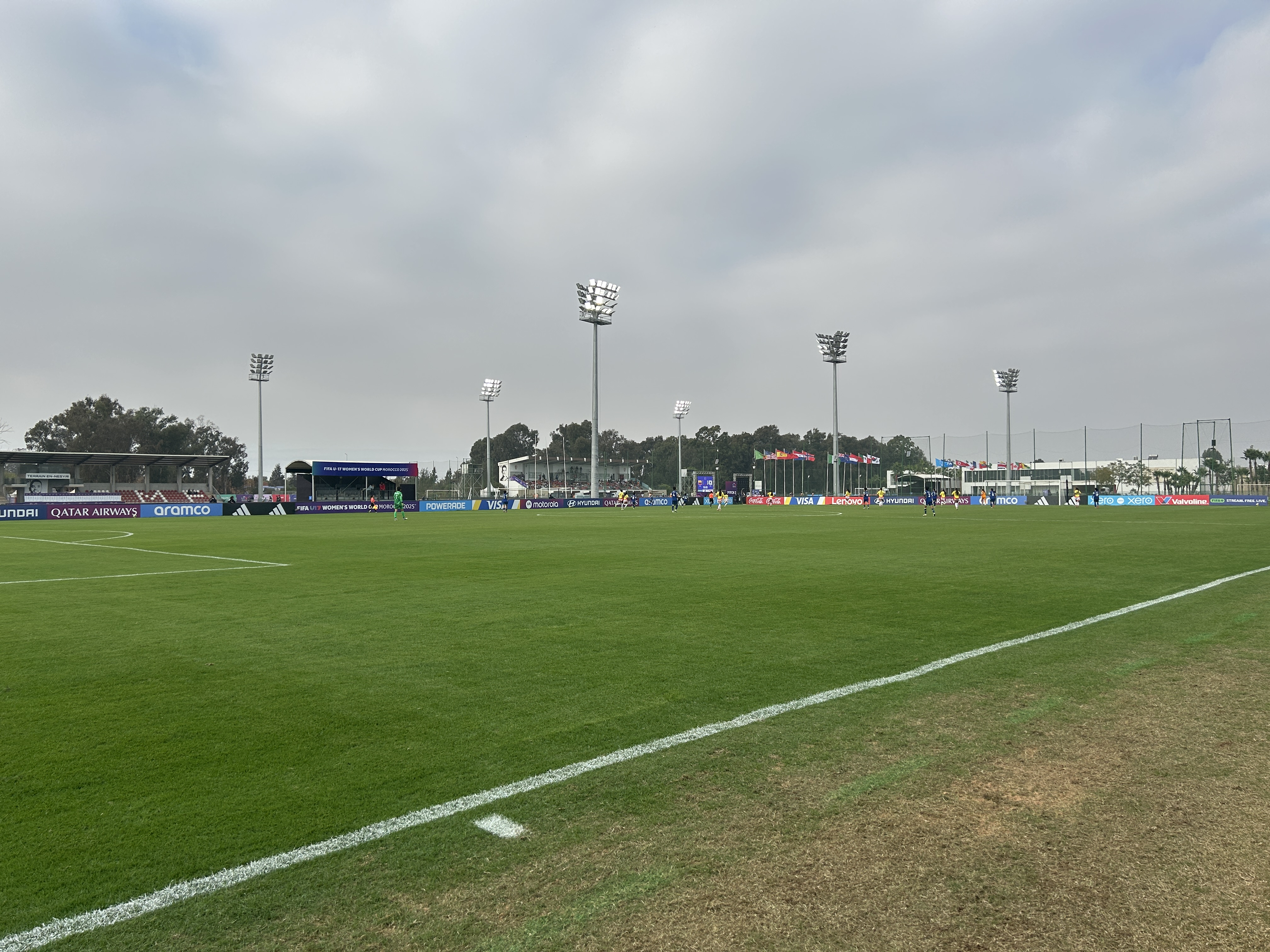

== Teams ==
=== Slot allocation ===
Teams qualified Teams failed to qualify Teams withdrew or suspended Did not enter Not a FIFA member

The slot allocation will be as follows:

- AFC (Asia): 4 slots
- CAF (Africa): 5 slots (including hosts Morocco)
- CONCACAF (North America, Central America and the Caribbean): 4 slots
- CONMEBOL (South America): 4 slots
- OFC (Oceania): 2 slots
- UEFA (Europe): 5 slots

=== Qualification ===
A total of 24 teams will qualify for the final tournament. In addition to Morocco, who qualified automatically as the host nation, the other 23 teams qualified from six separate continental competitions.

Argentina, Australia and Puerto Rico will make their debut, with Puerto Rico participating in their first ever FIFA competition. Venezuela and Ghana qualified for the first time since 2016 and 2018, respectively.

Qualifying tournament	Team	Qualification date	Appearance(s)				Previous best performance
Qualifying tournament	Team	Qualification date	Total	First	Last	Streak	Previous best performance
Host nation	Morocco	14 March 2024	3rd	2022	2025	2	Round of 16 (2025)
2026 AFC U-17 Women's Asian Cup	Australia	11 May 2026	1st	Debut			
2026 AFC U-17 Women's Asian Cup	China	11 May 2026	5th	2012	2025	2	Round of 16 (2025)
2026 AFC U-17 Women's Asian Cup	Japan	11 May 2026	10th	2008	2025	10	Champions (2014)
2026 AFC U-17 Women's Asian Cup	North Korea	11 May 2026	9th	2008	2025	3	Champions (2008, 2016, 2024, 2025)
2026 African U-17 Women's World Cup qualification	Ghana	11 July 2026	7th	2008	2018	1	Third place (2012)
2026 African U-17 Women's World Cup qualification	Nigeria	11 July 2026	9th	2008	2025	4	Third place (2022)
2026 African U-17 Women's World Cup qualification	Kenya	12 July 2026	2nd	2024		1	Group stage (2024)
2026 African U-17 Women's World Cup qualification	Zambia	12 July 2026	4th	2014	2025	3	Round of 16 (2025)
2026 CONCACAF U-17 Women's World Cup qualification	Canada	22 March 2026	9th	2008	2025	2	Fourth place (2018)
2026 CONCACAF U-17 Women's World Cup qualification	Mexico	22 March 2026	9th	2010	2025	9	Runners-up (2018)
2026 CONCACAF U-17 Women's World Cup qualification	Puerto Rico	22 March 2026	1st	Debut			
2026 CONCACAF U-17 Women's World Cup qualification	United States	22 March 2026	8th	2008	2025	6	Runners-up (2008)
2026 South American Under-17 Women's Football Championship	Argentina	6 May 2026	1st	Debut			
2026 South American Under-17 Women's Football Championship	Brazil	6 May 2026	9th	2008	2025	6	Fourth place (2025)
2026 South American Under-17 Women's Football Championship	Chile	9 May 2026	3rd	2010	2022	1	Group stage (2010, 2022)
2026 South American Under-17 Women's Football Championship	Venezuela	9 May 2026	4th	2010	2016	1	Fourth place (2014, 2016)
2025 OFC U-16 Women's Championship	New Zealand	11 August 2025	10th	2008	2025	10	Third place (2018)
2025 OFC U-16 Women's Championship	Samoa	11 August 2025	2nd	2025		2	Group stage (2025)
2026 UEFA Women's U-17 Championship	Germany	7 May 2026	8th	2008	2022	1	Third place (2008)
2026 UEFA Women's U-17 Championship	France	8 May 2026	5th	2008	2025	2	Champions (2012)
2026 UEFA Women's U-17 Championship	Norway	10 May 2026	2nd	2025		2	Group stage (2025)
2026 UEFA Women's U-17 Championship	Spain	11 May 2026	8th	2010	2025	7	Champions (2018, 2022)
2026 UEFA Women's U-17 Championship	Poland	14 May 2026	2nd	2024		1	Quarter-finals (2024)

=== Draw ===
The draw took place on 21 May 2026 in Zurich, Switzerland.

Pots
Pot	Team	Confederation	2016	2018	2022	2024	2025	Total points
Pot	Team	Confederation	Points (20%)	Points (40%)	Points (60%)	Points (80%)	Points (100%)	Total points
1	Morocco (H)	CAF	Host nation, automatically assigned to Pot 1					
1	Spain	UEFA	2.6	5.6	9	12.8	10	40
1	North Korea	AFC	2.8	2.8	W	12.8	21	39.4
1	Japan	AFC	3.2	2.4	5.4	6.4	10	27.4
1	United States	CONCACAF	0.6	1.2	4.8	9.6	10	26.2
1	Canada	CONCACAF	0.8	3.6	1.2	DNQ	13	18.6
2	Brazil	CONMEBOL	0.6	1.6	4.2	3.2	9	18.6
2	Mexico	CONCACAF	1.4	3.6	1.8	0	11	17.8
2	(N/A) CAF 1 (Note: Due to the African qualifiers not yet being completed, placeholder teams were used for the draw. The seeding of CAF1 was based on the ranking position of Nigeria.)	CAF	0.2	DNQ	5.4	7.2	3	15.8
2	Germany	UEFA	1.4	2.4	7.8	DNQ	DNQ	11.6
2	France	UEFA	DNQ	DNQ	0.6	DNQ	8	8.6
2	China	AFC	DNQ	DNQ	1.8	DNQ	6	7.8
3	New Zealand	OFC	0.6	4	0	0.8	0	5.4
3	(N/A) CAF 2 (Note: Due to the African qualifiers not yet being completed, placeholder teams were used for the draw. The seeding of CAF2 was based on the ranking position of Ghana.)	CAF	1.2	4	DNQ	DNQ	DNQ	5.2
3	Poland	UEFA	DNQ	DNQ	DNQ	4	DNQ	4
3	(N/A) CAF 3 (Note: Due to the African qualifiers not yet being completed, placeholder teams were used for the draw. The seeding of CAF3 was based on the ranking position of Zambia.)	CAF	DNQ	DNQ	DNQ	0	3	3
3	(N/A) CAF 4 (Note: Due to the African qualifiers not yet being completed, placeholder teams were used for the draw. The seeding of CAF4 was based on the ranking position of Kenya.)	CAF	DNQ	DNQ	DNQ	2.4	DNQ	2.4
3	Chile	CONMEBOL	DNQ	DNQ	1.8	DNQ	DNQ	1.8
4	Venezuela	CONMEBOL	1.8	DNQ	DNQ	DNQ	DNQ	1.8
4	Norway	UEFA	DNQ	DNQ	DNQ	DNQ	0	0
4	Samoa	OFC	DNQ	DNQ	DNQ	DNQ	0	0
4	Australia	AFC	DNQ	DNQ	DNQ	DNQ	DNQ	0
4	Puerto Rico	CONCACAF	DNQ	DNQ	DNQ	DNQ	DNQ	0
4	Argentina	CONMEBOL	DNQ	DNQ	DNQ	DNQ	DNQ	0

=== Squads ===
Players born between 1 January 2009 and 31 December 2011 were eligible to compete in the tournament.

== Match officials ==
On 23 June 2026, FIFA confirmed that a total of 54 match officials have been appointed for the competition, comprising 18 referees and 36 assistant referees.

Confederation	Referee	Assistant referees
AFC	(China) Dong Fangyu	(China) Xie Lijun (China) Bao Mengxiao
AFC	(Australia) Lara Lee	(Kyrgyzstan) Ramina Tsoi (Thailand) Nuannid Donjangreed
AFC	(South Korea) Oh Hyeon-jeong	(South Korea) Park Mi-suk (South Korea) Lee Soo-bin
CAF	(Algeria) Ghada Mehat	(Algeria) Asma Ouahab (Niger) Sakina Hamidou Alfa
CAF	(Kenya) Josephine Wanjiru	(Zambia) Nancy Kasitu (Senegal) Tabara Mbodji
CAF	(Egypt) Shahenda El Maghrabi	(Mauritius) Queency Victoire (Tunisia) Houda Afine
CAF	(Morocco) Zoulaikha Harmasse	
CAF	(Cameroon) Aline Guimbang	
CONCACAF	(Canada) Carly Shaw-MacLaren	(Canada) Melissa Snedden (Jamaica) Stephanie Yee Sing
CONCACAF	(Costa Rica) Deily Gómez	(Guatemala) Iris Vail Sales (Costa Rica) Kindria Agüero
CONCACAF	(Mexico) Karen Hernández	(Mexico) Mayra Mora (Mexico) Karla Angelica Flores Ortega
CONCACAF	(United States) Natalie Simon	(United States) Katarzyna Wasiak (United States) Tiffini Turpin
CONCACAF	(Dominican Republic) Vimarest Díaz	(Dominican Republic) Santa Felicia Medina Casanova (Trinidad and Tobago) Melissa Cureen Nicholas
CONMEBOL	(Argentina) Adriana Álvarez de Olivera	(Argentina) Carla López (Argentina) María Belén Bevilacqua
CONMEBOL	(Bolivia) Alejandra Quisbert	(Bolivia) Elizabeth Blanco Ugarte (Bolivia) Maria Luisa Cabezas Galean
CONMEBOL	(Colombia) Paula Fernández Ome	(Colombia) Nataly Arteaga (Colombia) Carolina Vicuña Collazos
UEFA	(Albania) Emanuela Rusta	
UEFA	(Belgium) Caroline Lanssens	(Slovenia) Štaša Špur (Switzerland) Linda Schmid
UEFA	(Germany) Fabienne Michel	(Austria) Amina Gutschi (Germany) Anne Uersfeld
UEFA	(Poland) Michalina Diakow	(Croatia) Ivona Pejić (Romania) Marilena Catalina Nan
UEFA	(Slovakia) Miriama Bocková	(Hungary) Anita Vad (Sweden) Tilde Hedberg

== Group stage ==
All times are local, GMT (UTC+0).

Tie-breaking criteria for group play
The ranking of teams in the group stage was determined as follows:
1. Points obtained in all group matches;
2. Points obtained in the matches played between the teams in question;
3. Goal difference in the matches played between the teams in question;
4. Number of goals scored in the matches played between the teams in question;
5. Goal difference in all group matches;
6. Number of goals scored in all group matches;
7. Fair play points in all group matches (only one deduction could be applied to a player in a single match):
  - Yellow card: −1 points;
  - Indirect red card (second yellow card): −3 points;
  - Direct red card: −4 points;
  - Yellow card and direct red card: −5 points;
8. Drawing of lots.

=== Group A ===
Pos	Team	Pld	W	D	L	GF	GA	GD	Pts	Qualification
1	Germany	3	3	0	0	8	3	+5	9	Knockout stage
2	Argentina	3	2	0	1	8	3	+5	6	Knockout stage
3	Morocco	3	1	0	2	7	9	−2	3	Knockout stage
4	New Zealand	3	0	0	3	0	8	−8	0	

Source: FIFA
Rules for classification: Group stage tiebreakers
17 October 2026
15:00

Germany	2–1	Argentina
Hebben 25'; Kuhn 52'	Report	Diz 9'

Mohammed VI Football Academy (Pitch 1), Salé
Attendance: 259
Referee: Vimarest Díaz (Dominican Republic)
17 October 2026
18:00

Morocco	4–0	New Zealand
Abajiou 57'; Chaytor 70' (o.g.); Dhissi 76'; Youssoufi 82' (pen.)	Report

Mohammed VI Football Academy (Pitch 3), Salé
Attendance: 259
Referee: Carly Shaw-MacLaren (Canada)

20 October 2026
15:00

Argentina	2–0	New Zealand
Diz 42', 69'	Report

Mohammed VI Football Academy (Pitch 1), Salé
Attendance: 231
Referee: Natalie Simon (United States)
20 October 2026
18:00

Morocco	2–4	Germany
Mouradi 64', 90+5' (pen.)	Report	Kleemann 27'; Martens 34'; Choisy 45+2'; Giesen 50' (pen.)

Mohammed VI Football Academy (Pitch 3), Salé
Attendance: 231
Referee: Lara Lee (Australia)

23 October 2026
18:00

Argentina	5–1	Morocco
Diz 17', 29', 45+2'; Galarza 35'; Aguilar 73'	Report	Mouradi 58'

Mohammed VI Football Academy (Pitch 4), Salé
Attendance: 461
Referee: Karen Hernández (Mexico)
23 October 2026
18:00

New Zealand	0–2	Germany
	Report	Ernst 45+2'; Choisy 56'

Mohammed VI Football Academy (Pitch 3), Salé
Attendance: 461
Referee: Josephine Wanjiru (Kenya)

=== Group B ===
Pos	Team	Pld	W	D	L	GF	GA	GD	Pts	Qualification
1	North Korea	3	2	0	1	13	4	+9	6	Knockout stage
2	Nigeria	3	2	0	1	6	3	+3	6	Knockout stage
3	Poland	3	2	0	1	9	9	0	6	Knockout stage
4	Puerto Rico	3	0	0	3	2	14	−12	0	

Source: FIFA
Rules for classification: Group stage tiebreakers
17 October 2026
15:00

North Korea	6–0	Puerto Rico
Yu Jong-hyang 6', 38'; Ri Ui-gyong 19'; Kim Won-sim 34', 50'; Ri Ye-rim 45+1'	Report

Mohammed VI Football Academy (Pitch 2), Salé
Attendance: 259
Referee: Alejandra Quisbert (Bolivia)
17 October 2026
18:00

Poland	2–1	Nigeria
Skrzypczak 33' (pen.); Skrok 65'	Report	Umejiaku 79'

Mohammed VI Football Academy (Pitch 4), Salé
Attendance: 259
Referee: Dong Fangyu (China)

20 October 2026
15:00

North Korea	6–1	Poland
Ri Ye-rim 9'; Yu Jong-hyang 29', 53'; Kim Won-sim 40', 40+5'; Ri Ui-gyong 58'	Report	Gałuszka 46'

Mohammed VI Football Academy (Pitch 2), Salé
Attendance: 231
Referee: Emanuela Rusta (Albania)
20 October 2026
18:00

Nigeria	2–0	Puerto Rico
Adegbuyi 25'; Oscar 90+3'	Report

Mohammed VI Football Academy (Pitch 4), Salé
Attendance: 231
Referee: Adriana Álvarez de Olivera (Argentina)

23 October 2026
15:00

Nigeria	3–1	North Korea
Adegbuyi 15'; Umejiaku 38'; Yusuf 56'	Report	Yu Jong-hyang 82' (pen.)

Mohammed VI Football Academy (Pitch 1), Salé
Attendance: 199
Referee: Fabienne Michel (Germany)
23 October 2026
15:00

Puerto Rico	2–6	Poland
Olmo 51', 90+1'	Report	Leśkiewicz 3'; Burzan 11', 72' (pen.); Skrzypczak 34', 45+2'; Świtała 90+7'

Mohammed VI Football Academy (Pitch 2), Salé
Attendance: 198
Referee: Zoulaikha Harmasse (Morocco)

=== Group C ===
Pos	Team	Pld	W	D	L	GF	GA	GD	Pts	Qualification
1	Brazil	3	2	1	0	12	5	+7	7	Knockout stage
2	Ghana	3	1	1	1	5	6	−1	4	Knockout stage
3	Canada	3	1	0	2	5	10	−5	3 (Note: Head-to-head points: Canada 3, Norway 0.)	
4	Norway	3	1	0	2	5	6	−1	3	

Source: FIFA
Rules for classification: Group stage tiebreakers
Notes:
18 October 2026
15:00

Canada	2–6	Brazil
Tingley 4'; Scicchitano 50'	Report	Helena 45+4'; Nicolly Manuel 46'; Marcela Bontorim 56'; Greise Kelly 63', 72'; Pepê 90+5'

Mohammed VI Football Academy (Pitch 1), Salé
Attendance: 156
Referee: Oh Hyeon-jeong (South Korea)
18 October 2026
18:00

Norway	3–0	Ghana
Lepore 6'; Melgård 13', 80'	Report

Mohammed VI Football Academy (Pitch 3), Salé
Attendance: 156
Referee: Karen Hernández (Mexico)

21 October 2026
15:00

Canada	3–2	Norway
Tingley 15', 32' (pen.); Fairweather 78'	Report	Klæbo-Solemdal 45+3'; Nesse 84'

Mohammed VI Football Academy (Pitch 1), Salé
Attendance: 218
Referee: Miriama Bocková (Slovakia)
21 October 2026
18:00

Ghana	3–3	Brazil
Osman 31'; Ameaa 35'; Mensah 85'	Report	Nicolly Manuel 7'; Kaillany Ranifah 44'; Indy 57'

Mohammed VI Football Academy (Pitch 3), Salé
Attendance: 221
Referee: Deily Gómez (Costa Rica)

24 October 2026
15:00

Ghana	2–0	Canada
Achiaa 64'; Ashiaku 90+5'	Report

Mohammed VI Football Academy (Pitch 1), Salé
Attendance: 203
Referee: Paula Fernández Ome (Colombia)
24 October 2026
15:00

Brazil	3–0	Norway
Carol Melo 13'; Sofia Gamonal 48'; Helena 90+10' (pen.)	Report

Mohammed VI Football Academy (Pitch 2), Salé
Attendance: 203
Referee: Vimarest Díaz (Dominican Republic)

=== Group D ===
Pos	Team	Pld	W	D	L	GF	GA	GD	Pts	Qualification
1	Japan	3	3	0	0	9	0	+9	9	Knockout stage
2	France	3	2	0	1	3	2	+1	6	Knockout stage
3	Venezuela	3	1	0	2	3	6	−3	3	Knockout stage
4	Zambia	3	0	0	3	2	9	−7	0	

Source: FIFA
Rules for classification: Group stage tiebreakers
18 October 2026
15:00

Japan	5–0	Zambia
Kurita 9', 88'; G. Phiri 13' (o.g.); Shimizu 72'; Tanaka 90+6'	Report

Mohammed VI Football Academy (Pitch 2), Salé
Attendance: 156
Referee: Caroline Lanssens (Belgium)
18 October 2026
18:00

France	2–0	Venezuela
Ané 17'; L. Motyka 56' (pen.)	Report

Mohammed VI Football Academy (Pitch 4), Salé
Attendance: 156
Referee: Deily Gómez (Costa Rica)

21 October 2026
15:00

Japan	2–0	France
Hanashiro 88', 90+3'	Report

Mohammed VI Football Academy (Pitch 2), Salé
Attendance: 218
Referee: Carly Shaw-MacLaren (Canada)
21 October 2026
18:00

Venezuela	3–2	Zambia
Ojeda 13'; Durán 63'; Suárez 90+10'	Report	Mofya 4'; G. Phiri 54'

Mohammed VI Football Academy (Pitch 4), Salé
Attendance: 220
Referee: Dong Fangyu (China)

24 October 2026
18:00

Venezuela	0–2	Japan
	Report	Hanashiro 8'; Kishida 66'

Mohammed VI Football Academy (Pitch 3), Salé
Attendance: 303
Referee: Natalie Simon (United States)
24 October 2026
18:00

Zambia	0–1	France
	Report	L. Motyka 16'

Mohammed VI Football Academy (Pitch 4), Salé
Attendance: 303
Referee: Miriama Bocková (Slovakia)

=== Group E ===
Pos	Team	Pld	W	D	L	GF	GA	GD	Pts	Qualification
1	China	3	3	0	0	13	2	+11	9	Knockout stage
2	United States	3	2	0	1	25	4	+21	6	Knockout stage
3	Kenya	3	1	0	2	5	9	−4	3	Knockout stage
4	Samoa	3	0	0	3	0	28	−28	0	

Source: FIFA
Rules for classification: Group stage tiebreakers
19 October 2026
15:00

Kenya	0–3	China
	Report	Xu Yue 12'; Xu Xiaotang 50', 53'

Mohammed VI Football Academy (Pitch 1), Salé
Attendance: 171
Referee: Fabienne Michel (Germany)
19 October 2026
18:00

United States	17–0	Samoa
DiMaria 2', 18', 20', 30', 70', 73'; Corona 12'; Paletta 25', 37'; Murray 28'; Manning 45+4'; Stanislaus 57'; Reyna 64', 78'; Ortiz 75'; Brewer 87'; Hanf 90'	Report

Mohammed VI Football Academy (Pitch 3), Salé
Attendance: 682
Referee: Zoulaikha Harmasse (Morocco)

22 October 2026
15:00

China	7–0	Samoa
Fang Zhenzhu 6' (pen.); Xu Yue 25', 29'; Cheng Wandi 39', 57' (pen.); Liu Yuxi 69'; Yang Lan 76'	Report

Mohammed VI Football Academy (Pitch 1), Salé
Attendance: 200
Referee: Aline Guimbang (Cameroon)
22 October 2026
18:00

United States	6–1	Kenya
DiMaria 5', 22', 35' (pen.), 45+2' (pen.); Paletta 48'; Hanf 90+3'	Report	Atieno 90+5'

Mohammed VI Football Academy (Pitch 3), Salé
Attendance: 279
Referee: Oh Hyeon-jeong (South Korea)

25 October 2026
18:00

China	3–2	United States
Liu Yuxi 7', 81'; Zhao Jiayi 71'	Report	DiMaria 69'; Ortiz 90+7'

Mohammed VI Football Academy (Pitch 3), Salé
Attendance: 1,316
Referee: Lara Lee (Australia)
25 October 2026
18:00

Samoa	0–4	Kenya
	Report	Bakari 4', 64'; Br. Awuor 44'; Maloba 62'

Mohammed VI Football Academy (Pitch 4), Salé
Attendance: 658
Referee: Adriana Álvarez de Olivera (Argentina)

=== Group F ===
Pos	Team	Pld	W	D	L	GF	GA	GD	Pts	Qualification
1	Spain	3	3	0	0	8	2	+6	9	Knockout stage
2	Mexico	3	2	0	1	4	3	+1	6	Knockout stage
3	Australia	3	0	1	2	2	5	−3	1	
4	Chile	3	0	1	2	3	7	−4	1	

Source: FIFA
Rules for classification: Group stage tiebreakers
19 October 2026
15:00

Spain	2–0	Mexico
Ferrera 42'; Vizuete 48'	Report

Mohammed VI Football Academy (Pitch 2), Salé
Attendance: 171
Referee: Paula Fernández Ome (Colombia)
19 October 2026
18:00

Australia	1–1	Chile
Bradshaw 63'	Report	Concha 33'

Mohammed VI Football Academy (Pitch 4), Salé
Attendance: 171
Referee: Josephine Wanjiru (Kenya)

22 October 2026
15:00

Spain	3–1	Australia
Gálvez 10', 66' (pen.); Vizuete 16'	Report	Karaberis 68'

Mohammed VI Football Academy (Pitch 2), Salé
Attendance: 200
Referee: Alejandra Quisbert (Bolivia)
22 October 2026
18:00

Chile	1–3	Mexico
Muñoz 12'	Report	Urbano 35'; Reyes 65'; Jiménez 83'

Mohammed VI Football Academy (Pitch 4), Salé
Attendance: 279
Referee: Caroline Lanssens (Belgium)

25 October 2026
15:00

Chile	1–3	Spain
Gálvez 90+8'	Report	Aymerich 5'; Quintana 22', 59'

Mohammed VI Football Academy (Pitch 2), Salé
Attendance: 310
Referee: Aline Guimbang (Cameroon)
25 October 2026
15:00

Mexico	1–0	Australia
Reyes 35'	Report

Mohammed VI Football Academy (Pitch 1), Salé
Attendance: 310
Referee: Emanuela Rusta (Albania)

=== Ranking of third-placed teams ===
The four best third-placed teams from the six groups advance to the knockout stage along with the six group winners and six runners-up.

Tie-breaking criteria for third-placed teams
The ranking of third-placed teams was determined as follows:
1. Points obtained in all group matches;
2. Goal difference in all group matches;
3. Number of goals scored in all group matches;
4. Fair play points in all group matches (only one deduction could be applied to a player in a single match):
  - Yellow card: −1 points;
  - Indirect red card (second yellow card): −3 points;
  - Direct red card: −4 points;
  - Yellow card and direct red card: −5 points;
5. Drawing of lots.

Pos	Grp	Team	Pld	W	D	L	GF	GA	GD	Pts	Qualification
1	B	Poland	3	2	0	1	9	9	0	6	Knockout stage
2	A	Morocco	3	1	0	2	7	9	−2	3	Knockout stage
3	D	Venezuela	3	1	0	2	3	6	−3	3	Knockout stage
4	E	Kenya	3	1	0	2	5	9	−4	3	Knockout stage
5	C	Canada	3	1	0	2	5	10	−5	3	
6	F	Australia	3	0	1	2	2	5	−3	1	

Source: FIFA
Rules for classification: Third-placed teams tiebreakers

== Knockout stage ==
In the knockout stage, if a match was level at the end of normal playing time, no extra time is played and a penalty shoot-out is held to determine the winners.

=== Bracket ===
Round of 16
28 October – Salé
Argentina	1 (4)
Ghana (p)	1 (5)
29 October – Salé
Japan	3
Kenya	1
28 October – Salé
North Korea	6
Morocco	0
29 October – Salé
Spain	1
United States	2
29 October – Salé
China (p)	0 (4)
France	0 (3)
28 October – Salé
Brazil (p)	3 (8)
Poland	3 (7)
29 October – Salé
Nigeria	2
Mexico	1
28 October – Salé
Germany	0
Venezuela	1

Quarter-finals
1 November – Salé
Ghana	0
Japan	1
1 November – Salé
North Korea	3
United States	0
1 November – Salé
China	1
Brazil	2
1 November – Salé
Nigeria	1
Venezuela	0

Semi-finals
4 November – Salé
Japan (p)	1 (4)
North Korea	1 (1)
4 November – Salé
Brazil	1
Nigeria	3

Final
7 November – Salé
Japan	1
Nigeria	2
Third place match
7 November – Salé
North Korea	6
Brazil	0

=== Round of 16 ===
28 October 2026
15:00

Argentina	1–1	Ghana
Diz 86'	Report	Appiah 16'
Penalties
Diz (penalty scored); Gómez (penalty missed); Conde (penalty scored); Maldonado (penalty scored); Vinhas (penalty scored)	4–5	(penalty scored) Essinam; (penalty scored) Ashiaku; (penalty scored) Osman; (penalty scored) Gyekyewaa; (penalty scored) Appiah

Mohammed VI Football Academy (Pitch 3), Salé
Attendance: 160
Referee: Emanuela Rusta (Albania)

28 October 2026
15:00

Germany	0–1	Venezuela
	Report	Bravo 5'

Mohammed VI Football Academy (Pitch 1), Salé
Attendance: 160
Referee: Deily Gómez (Costa Rica)

28 October 2026
18:00

North Korea	6–0	Morocco
Yu Jong-hyang 6', 43'; Kim Won-sim 33', 41'; Ri Ui-gyong 54'; Ri Kyong-im 62'	Report

Mohammed VI Football Academy (Pitch 2), Salé
Attendance: 664
Referee: Karen Hernández (Mexico)

28 October 2026
18:00

Brazil	3–3	Poland
Greise Kelly 11'; Marcela Bontorim 52'; Pepê 73'	Report	Gałuszka 34'; Burzan 36', 83'
Penalties
Indy (penalty scored); Pepê (penalty scored); Greise Kelly (penalty scored); Marcela Bontorim (penalty scored); Helena (penalty missed); Gigi Pires (penalty scored); Isa Rech (penalty scored); Yasmin Queiroz (penalty scored); Sofia Gamonal (penalty scored)	8–7	(penalty missed) Skrzypczak; (penalty scored) Burzan; (penalty scored) Kania; (penalty scored) Ma. Wiśniewska; (penalty scored) Grewling; (penalty scored) Polewska; (penalty scored) Saja; (penalty scored) Zarzycka; (penalty missed) Gałuszka

Mohammed VI Football Academy (Pitch 4), Salé
Attendance: 663
Referee: Carly Shaw-MacLaren (Canada)

29 October 2026
15:00

China	0–0	France
	Report
Penalties
Liu Yuxi (penalty scored); Liu Yuke (penalty scored); Liu Yuchen (penalty missed); Yang Lan (penalty scored); Cheng Wandi (penalty scored)	4–3	(penalty missed) L. Motyka; (penalty scored) Ané; (penalty scored) Chovin; (penalty scored) Girardot; (penalty missed) Mabilon

Mohammed VI Football Academy (Pitch 1), Salé
Attendance: 200
Referee: Alejandra Quisbert (Bolivia)

29 October 2026
15:00

Nigeria	2–1	Mexico
Umejiaku 40'; Dunstan 71'	Report	Delgado 90+10'

Mohammed VI Football Academy (Pitch 2), Salé
Attendance: 200
Referee: Miriama Bocková (Slovakia)

29 October 2026
18:00

Japan	3–1	Kenya
Hanashiro 36'; Kurita 59'; Tanaka 75'	Report	B. Achieng 29'

Mohammed VI Football Academy (Pitch 3), Salé
Attendance: 462
Referee: Paula Fernández Ome (Colombia)

29 October 2026
18:00

Spain	1–2	United States
Molina 71'	Report	Stanislaus 43'; DiMaria 45+3'

Mohammed VI Football Academy (Pitch 4), Salé
Attendance: 462
Referee: Dong Fangyu (China)

=== Quarter-finals ===
1 November 2026
15:00

Ghana	0–1	Japan
	Report	Kurita 54'

Mohammed VI Football Academy (Pitch 1), Salé
Attendance: 166
Referee: Vimarest Díaz (Dominican Republic)

1 November 2026
15:00

North Korea	3–0	United States
Ri Ui-gyong 30', 56'; Ri Ye-rim 45+4'	Report

Mohammed VI Football Academy (Pitch 2), Salé
Attendance: 167
Referee: Lara Lee (Australia)

1 November 2026
18:00

China	1–2	Brazil
Wu Yichen 42'	Report	Helena 46', 87'

Mohammed VI Football Academy (Pitch 3), Salé
Attendance: 502
Referee: Natalie Simon (United States)

1 November 2026
18:00

Nigeria	1–0	Venezuela
Oduntan 89' (pen.)	Report

Mohammed VI Football Academy (Pitch 4), Salé
Attendance: 501
Referee: Oh Hyeon-jeong (South Korea)

=== Semi-finals ===
4 November 2026
15:00

Japan	1–1	North Korea
Won Sol-gyong 90+4' (o.g.)	Report	Ri Ui-gyong 52'
Penalties
Ota (penalty scored); Shimizu (penalty scored); Yotsumoto (penalty scored); Tanaka (penalty scored)	4–1	(penalty scored) Ri Pok-rim; (penalty missed) Eh Chong-gum; (penalty missed) Kim Ju-gyong

Mohammed VI Football Academy (Pitch 2), Salé
Attendance: 206
Referee: Carly Shaw-MacLaren (Canada)

4 November 2026
18:00

Brazil	1–3	Nigeria
Greise Kelly 89'	Report	Joseph 56'; Bashiru 71', 80'

Mohammed VI Football Academy (Pitch 3), Salé
Attendance: 284
Referee: Karen Hernández (Mexico)

=== Bronze final ===
7 November 2026
15:00

North Korea	6–0	Brazil
Kim Won-sim 12'; Ri Ui-gyong 43', 71'; Ri Ye-rim 61'; Yu Jong-hyang 86'; Ri Kyong-im 87'	Report

Mohammed VI Football Academy (Pitch 2), Salé
Attendance: 254
Referee: Lara Lee (Australia)

=== Final ===
7 November 2026
18:30

Japan	1–2	Nigeria
F. Ito 80'	Report	Bashiru 39'; Umejiaku 47'

Mohammed VI Football Academy (Pitch 3), Salé
Attendance: 1,121
Referee: Natalie Simon (United States)

2026 FIFA U-17 Women's World Cup winners

Nigeria
First title

== Awards ==
The following awards were given for the tournament:

Golden Ball	Silver Ball	Bronze Ball
(Nigeria) Oluebube Umejiaku	(North Korea) Yu Jong-hyang	(Japan) Fuki Ito
Golden Boot	Silver Boot	Bronze Boot
(United States) Maddie DiMaria	(North Korea) Yu Jong-hyang	(North Korea) Ri Ui-gyong
12 goals	8 goals, 5 assists	8 goals, 2 assists
Golden Glove
(North Korea) Kim Son-gyong
FIFA Fair Play Award
Japan

== Goalscorers ==
There were 205 goals scored in 52 matches, for an average of 3.94 goals per match.

12 goals

- (United States) Maddie DiMaria

8 goals

- (North Korea) Ri Ui-gyong
- (North Korea) Yu Jong-hyang

7 goals

- (Argentina) Mercedes Diz
- (North Korea) Kim Won-sim

4 goals

- (Brazil) Greise Kelly
- (Brazil) Helena
- (Japan) Mei Hanashiro
- (Japan) Nanami Kurita
- (Nigeria) Oluebube Umejiaku
- (North Korea) Ri Ye-rim
- (Poland) Zofia Burzan

3 goals

- (Canada) Reed Tingley
- (China) Liu Yuxi
- (China) Xu Yue
- (Morocco) Nessma Mouradi
- (Nigeria) Awawu Bashiru
- (Poland) Wiktoria Skrzypczak
- (United States) Loradana Paletta

2 goals

- (Brazil) Marcela Bontorim
- (Brazil) Nicolly Manuel
- (Brazil) Pepê
- (China) Cheng Wandi
- (China) Xu Xiaotang
- (France) Léa Motyka
- (Germany) Clara Choisy
- (Japan) Asuka Tanaka
- (Kenya) Mwanakombo Bakari
- (Mexico) Citlalli Reyes
- (Nigeria) Oluwakemi Adegbuyi
- (Norway) Maia Melgård
- (Poland) Nicola Gałuszka
- (Puerto Rico) Aleeya Olmo
- (North Korea) Ri Kyong-im
- (Spain) Ángela Gálvez
- (Spain) Bruna Quintana
- (Spain) Elena Vizuete
- (United States) Gianna Hanf
- (United States) Isabella Ortiz
- (United States) Carolina Reyna
- (United States) Deus Stanislaus

1 goal

- (Argentina) Julieta Aguilar
- (Argentina) Josefina Galarza
- (Australia) Charlotte Bradshaw
- (Australia) Frida Karaberis
- (Brazil) Carol Melo
- (Brazil) Indy
- (Brazil) Kaillany Ranifah
- (Brazil) Sofia Gamonal
- (Canada) Adalyn Fairweather
- (Canada) Chloe Scicchitano
- (Chile) Kiara Concha
- (Chile) Florencia Gálvez
- (Chile) Catalina Muñoz
- (China) Fang Zhenzhu
- (China) Wu Yichen
- (China) Yang Lan
- (China) Zhao Jiayi
- (France) Maëlys Ané
- (Germany) Laura Ernst
- (Germany) Mia Giesen
- (Germany) Johanna Hebben
- (Germany) Marie Kleemann
- (Germany) Mia Kuhn
- (Germany) Lena Martens
- (Ghana) Linda Achiaa
- (Ghana) Gloria Ameaa
- (Ghana) Jessica Appiah
- (Ghana) Christiana Ashiaku
- (Ghana) Priscilla Mensah
- (Ghana) Rafia Osman
- (Japan) Fuki Ito
- (Japan) Yuka Kishida
- (Japan) Wara Shimizu
- (Kenya) Brenda Achieng
- (Kenya) Lindey Atieno
- (Kenya) Brenda Awuor
- (Kenya) Gaudancia Maloba
- (Mexico) Emily Delgado
- (Mexico) Nicole Jiménez
- (Mexico) Mia Urbano
- (Morocco) Sonia Abajiou
- (Morocco) Imane Dhissi
- (Morocco) Hiba Youssoufi
- (Nigeria) Mary Dunstan
- (Nigeria) Queen Joseph
- (Nigeria) Azeezat Oduntan
- (Nigeria) Precious Oscar
- (Nigeria) Kanyinsola Yusuf
- (Norway) Stine Klæbo-Solemdal
- (Norway) Isabella Lepore
- (Norway) Hanne Nesse
- (Poland) Maja Leśkiewicz
- (Poland) Natalia Skrok
- (Poland) Zofia Świtała
- (Spain) María Aymerich
- (Spain) Carolina Ferrera
- (Spain) Vera Molina
- (United States) Meila Brewer
- (United States) Mia Corona
- (United States) Amari Manning
- (United States) Grace Murray
- (Venezuela) Diana Bravo
- (Venezuela) Orliany Durán
- (Venezuela) Ariana Ojeda
- (Venezuela) Andrea Suárez
- (Zambia) Elizabeth Mofya
- (Zambia) Grace Phiri

1 own goal

- (New Zealand) Eden Chaytor (against Morocco)
- (North Korea) Won Sol-gyong (against Japan)
- (Zambia) Grace Phiri (against Japan)

Source: FIFA

== Controversies ==
=== UEFA boycott attempt ===
On 30 July 2026, following FIFA's announcement of FIFA Forward Enterprise (a proposal to sell stakes in FIFA's tournament operations, including for the U-17 Women's World Cup, to private investors), all 55 UEFA member associations agreed on an indefinite boycott of FIFA competitions until the proposal was shelved and assurances were made that such a proposal would not be tabulated again. As the boycott was announced with two and a half months until the tournament begins, it was unknown what would happen to the five qualified UEFA teams, with withdrawal a possible option. A day later on 31 July, the proposal was scrapped, although UEFA stated that, regardless, it no longer trusts FIFA's governance. Following written assurances that a similar proposal wouldn't be brought up, UEFA provisionally suspended their boycott for the 2026–27 season, which includes the FIFA U-17 Women's World Cup.

== See also ==
- 2026 FIFA U-17 World Cup
- 2026 FIFA U-20 Women's World Cup
