= 2021 FIFA U-17 Women's World Cup =

Tournament details
- Host country: India
- Dates: Cancelled
- Teams: 16 (from 6 confederations)
- Venues: 5 (in 5 host cities)

The 2020 FIFA U-17 Women's World Cup, later postponed and renamed as the 2021 FIFA U-17 Women's World Cup before its cancellation, was originally going to be the 7th edition of the FIFA U-17 Women's World Cup, the biennial international women's youth football championship contested by the under-17 national teams of the member associations of FIFA, since its inception in 2008.

The tournament was originally scheduled to be held in India between 2 and 21 November 2020. However, due to the COVID-19 pandemic, FIFA announced on 3 April 2020 that the tournament would be postponed and rescheduled. On 12 May 2020, FIFA announced that the tournament would be held between 17 February – 7 March 2021, subject to further monitoring.

On 17 November 2020, FIFA announced that the 2020 edition of the tournament would be cancelled. Instead, India were appointed as hosts of the next edition of the tournament in 2022.

Spain were the defending champions, having won their first title in 2018.

== Host selection ==
On 25 July 2018, FIFA announced that bidding process had begun for the 2020 FIFA U-20 Women's World Cup and the 2020 FIFA U-17 Women's World Cup. A member association was able to bid for both tournaments, with the caveat that two different hosts would be appointed. The following associations declared interest in hosting the event by the deadline of 12 September 2018:

- France
- India

India was appointed as the host by the FIFA Council meeting at Miami on 15 March 2019.

== Qualified teams ==
A total of 16 teams would have qualified for the final tournament. In addition to India who would have automatically qualified as host, 15 other teams would have qualified from six separate continental competitions.

| Confederation | Qualifying tournament | Team | Appearance (planned) | Last appearance | Previous best performance |
|---|---|---|---|---|---|
| AFC (Asia) (Hosts + 2 teams) | Host nation | India | 1st | None | Debut |
| AFC (Asia) (Hosts + 2 teams) | 2019 AFC U-16 Women's Championship | Japan | 7th | 2018 | Champions (2014) |
| AFC (Asia) (Hosts + 2 teams) | 2019 AFC U-16 Women's Championship | North Korea | 7th | 2018 | Champions (2008, 2016) |
| CAF (Africa) (3 teams) | 2020 African U-17 Women's World Cup Qualifying Tournament | N/A | | | |
| CAF (Africa) (3 teams) | 2020 African U-17 Women's World Cup Qualifying Tournament | N/A | | | |
| CAF (Africa) (3 teams) | 2020 African U-17 Women's World Cup Qualifying Tournament | N/A | | | |
| CONCACAF (Central, North America and Caribbean) (3 teams) | 2020 CONCACAF Women's U-17 Championship | N/A | | | |
| CONCACAF (Central, North America and Caribbean) (3 teams) | 2020 CONCACAF Women's U-17 Championship | N/A | | | |
| CONCACAF (Central, North America and Caribbean) (3 teams) | 2020 CONCACAF Women's U-17 Championship | N/A | | | |
| CONMEBOL (South America) (3 teams) | 2020 South American U-17 Women's Championship | N/A | | | |
| CONMEBOL (South America) (3 teams) | 2020 South American U-17 Women's Championship | N/A | | | |
| CONMEBOL (South America) (3 teams) | 2020 South American U-17 Women's Championship | N/A | | | |
| OFC (Oceania) (1 team) | 2020 OFC U-17 Women's Championship (cancelled due to COVID-19; nominated by OFC) | New Zealand | 7th | 2018 | Third place (2018) |
| UEFA (Europe) (3 teams) | 2020 UEFA Women's Under-17 Championship (cancelled due to COVID-19; nominated by UEFA) | England | 3rd | 2016 | Fourth place (2008) |
| UEFA (Europe) (3 teams) | 2020 UEFA Women's Under-17 Championship (cancelled due to COVID-19; nominated by UEFA) | Germany | 7th | 2018 | Third place (2008) |
| UEFA (Europe) (3 teams) | 2020 UEFA Women's Under-17 Championship (cancelled due to COVID-19; nominated by UEFA) | Spain | 5th | 2018 | Champions (2018) |

== Venues ==
On 27 August, Kalinga Stadium in the city of Bhubaneswar got provisional clearance as the first venue for the 2020 FIFA U-17 Women's World Cup. In November 2019, FIFA local organising committee after second inspection of Salt Lake Stadium in Kolkata, Indira Gandhi Athletic Stadium in Guwahati and Kalinga Stadium in Bhubaneswar, expressed their satisfaction with the preparation of infrastructure and the training facilities as the provisional venues for the tournament. On 22 December 2019, the organising committee announced EKA Arena at Ahmedabad as a provisional venue for the tournament. On 18 February 2020, the match schedule and all the five venues were finalised and announced together with the official schedule. Ahmedabad, Bhubaneswar, Guwahati and Kolkata would host the group-stage matches, where as the knockout matches would be played in four cities except Guwahati. The first match is scheduled to be held at Guwahati, and the final in Navi Mumbai.

An updated match schedule after the tournament was postponed to 2021 was announced by the All India Football Federation on 23 June 2020, with matches played at the same five venues.

| Bhubaneswar | Kolkata | Guwahati | Ahmedabad | Navi Mumbai |
| Kalinga Stadium | Salt Lake Stadium | Indira Gandhi Athletic Stadium | EKA Arena | DY Patil Stadium |
|---|---|---|---|---|
| 20°17′27.3″N 85°49′29″E | 22°34′08″N 88°24′33″E | 26°06′56″N 91°45′37″E | 23°00′39.7″N 72°35′56.8″E | 19°2′31″N 73°1′36″E |
| Capacity: 15,000 | Capacity: 85,000 | Capacity: 23,850 | Capacity: 25,000 | Capacity: 55,000 |
2021 FIFA U-17 Women's World Cup (India)

== Emblem and slogan ==
The official emblem was unveiled on 2 November 2019, at the iconic Gateway of India in Mumbai to mark one year to go. The design embodies a combination of elements from nature and Indian culture and civilisation. The emblem is designed in bright colour to incorporate India's vibrant culture. A bright blue waves rises from the base and reach up along the form of the trophy towards a crown forming the shape of Paisley or Boteh motif commonly used in Kashmiri Pashmina shawl and carpets. Within the Boteh motif, frames a ball made from a marigold flower, symbolizes growth and development, and used in almost all rituals, festivals and celebrations in India. The color and design of the petals of the marigold are drawn from Bandhani textiles, an Indian tie-dye technique dates back to Indus Valley Civilization. The design of the stem is derived from traditional Warli painting along with the bright hues found in Bandhani textile, which is accented with vibrant symbols of unity and celebration and represent nature and its resources.

On 18 February 2020, FIFA along with the Local Organising Committee (LOC) of the tournament announced the official slogan of the tournament. The official slogan of 2020 FIFA U-17 Women World Cup is "Kick Off The Dream". The director of the LOC said the slogan expresses a hope to "kickstart the growth of women's football" in India and is inclusive of everyone "to realise this dream".
