= Noori (goat) =

Cloned goat

- Species: Pashmina goat
- Sex: Female
- Born: 9 March 2012; SKUAST-K, Srinagar, India
- Died: 15 March 2023 (age 11); Shuhama Farm SKUAST-K
- Cause of death: Aging
- Nationality: India
- Notable role: First cloned pashmina goat

Noori (Arabic word for "light") was a female pashmina goat, the first pashmina goat to be cloned using the process of nuclear transfer. Born on 9 March 2012, she was kept at the place of her birth, at the Faculty of Veterinary Sciences and Animal Husbandry, Sher-e-Kashmir University of Agricultural Sciences and Technology of Kashmir, Shuhama, Srinagar in the Indian territory of Jammu and Kashmir.

== Birth ==
Noori was born on 9 March 2012 to three mothers (one provided the egg, another the DNA and a third carried the cloned embryo to term). She was created using the technique of somatic cell nuclear transfer, in which the cell nucleus from an adult cell is transferred into an unfertilised oocyte (developing egg cell) that has had its nucleus removed. The hybrid cell is then stimulated to divide by an electric shock, and when it develops into a blastocyst, it is implanted in a surrogate mother using laparoscopic surgery. This is the same method as was used in cloning the first mammal of the world, Dolly. Noori was cloned by Dr. Riaz Ahmad Shah, Dr.Syed Hilal Yaqoob, Dr. Maajid Hassan Bhat, Dr. Mujeeb Fazili, Firdous Ahmad Khan and colleagues at the Faculty of Veterinary Sciences and Animal Husbandry of Sher-e-Kashmir University of Agricultural Sciences and Technology of Kashmir in Shuhama, 13 km to the east of Srinagar. The successful cloning of Noori, which took two years, will assist the department in cloning the endangered species of Kashmir stag (hangul); they previously cloned a water buffalo in 2009. The funding for Noori's cloning was provided by the World Bank, which runs the National Agricultural Innovation Project (NAIP) of the Indian Council of Agricultural Research.

== Pashmina goat ==
Noori also offers hope to the people of Kashmir of increasing production of pashmina, a type of fine cashmere wool. At present pashmina wool is being imported from China to fulfill demand, due to the rarity of pashmina goat, which is a special breed of goat indigenous to high altitudes of the Himalayas in Ladakh. Pashmina shawls are hand spun and woven and the textiles are embroidered in Kashmir, where more than 10 million people are associated with this industry.

== Death ==
Noori died in March 2023 at the age of 11.
