= Turfani pashm =

Type of wool from goats

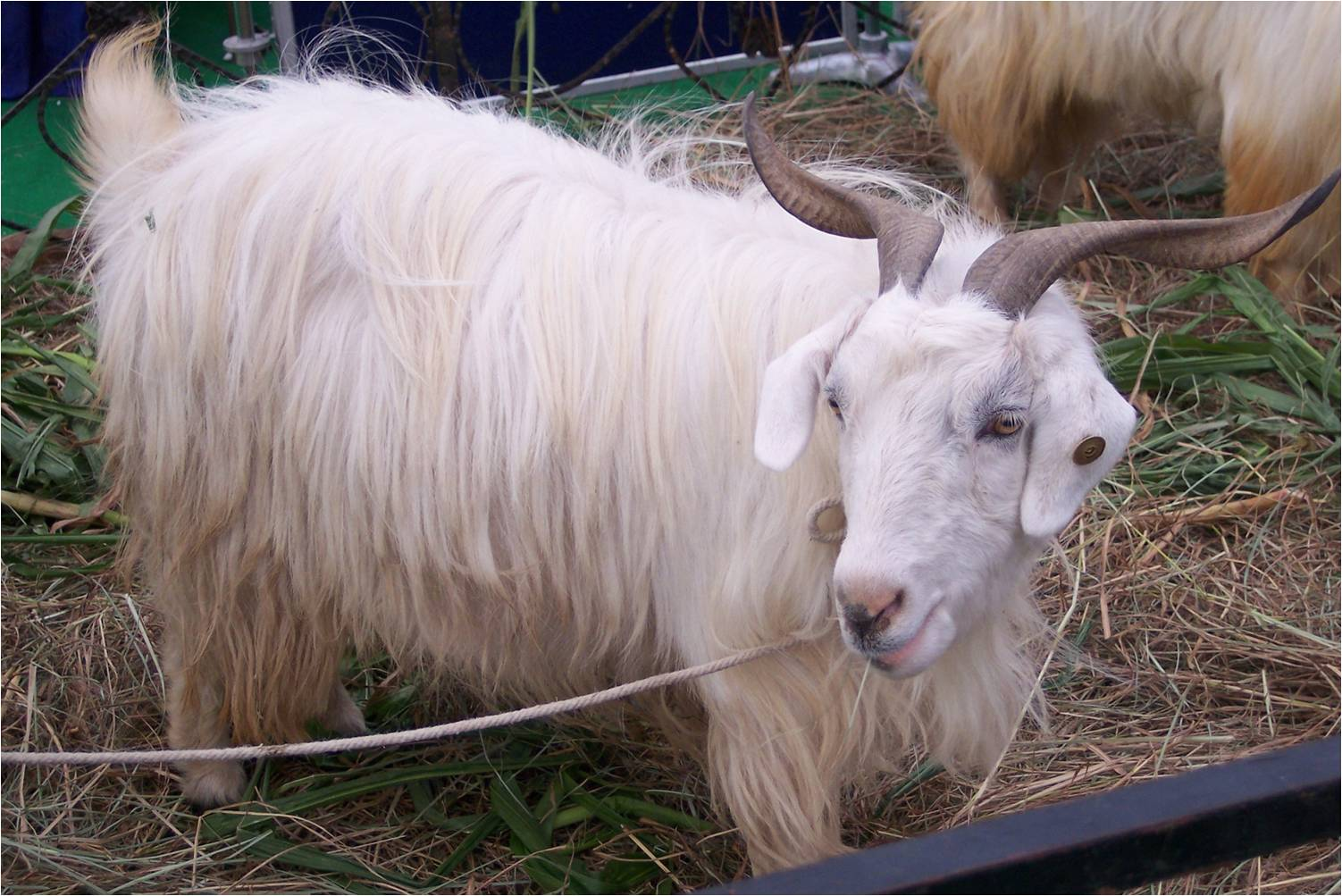
changthangi goat

Turfani pashm or Kuchari Pashm or Turfani wool is a type of shawl wool obtained from Tibetan goats. It was imported to India from Yarkant and Changtang (Chinese Tibet). The wool was considered valuable for certain shawls.

== Quality ==
Turfani was one of the finest cashmere wool.

== Imports ==
Turfani wool was imported in large quantities into Leh and in Ladakh from Changtang . The most imports were made for Maharaja's territory only and confined to Kashmir region. More than 700 maunds were imported in year. There was import duty on the Turfani pashm irrespective of the origin they were coming in 1860–1870.

== See also ==
- Puttoo
- Changthangi
