= Angola (shawl) =

Imitated version of Indian shawl

Angola was an imitated version of Indian shawl made with local wool options in England.

== Etymology ==
Angola was a derived word of ''Angora.'' a very soft Angora wool.

== Angola ==
Angola was attempted in Norwich, Lyons, and Edinburgh and Paisley. However, local manufacturers made it on machines such as drawlooms and Jacquard looms, unlike India, where a labor intensive handweaving tapestry technique was used to produce the material. The original Kashmiri shawls in India were woven in pieces and then joined. Missing fundamentals of the craftsmanship, the imitations made of Angola were short-lived.

== Angola shirting ==
Angola shirting, a twill weave structure, was a blend of cotton and wool fabric for shirts.

== See also ==
- Kashmir shawl
