= Thibet cloth =

Woven fabric made of goat's hair

Thibet cloth (Tibet cloth or Thibet) is a camlet made of goat's hair, originally from Tibet.

== Structure ==
Thibet cloth is a weave of goat's hair made by Tibetans in Asia. It is a heavy and coarse material. The cloth is normally used in local men's clothing. Thibet can also be defined as "a fine woolen fabric formerly used for dresses" or as a fabric used for suits and coats and "finished with a soft smooth heavily-felted face".

== Use ==
The Thibet cloth was suitable for over-coats.

== See also ==
- Puttoo
