= Kashmir shawl =

Fine shawl made in Kashmir

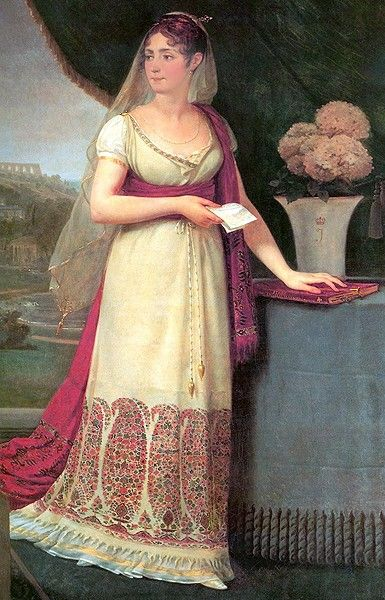
- A portrait of Empress Joséphine wearing a Kashmir shawl and a gown made of Kashmir shawl fabric
- Type: Shawl
- Material: Wool (shahtoosh, pashmina)
- Place of origin: Kashmir, India

The Kashmir shawl, the predecessor of the contemporary cashmere shawl, is a type of shawl native to the Kashmir Valley of Jammu and Kashmir, India, that is identified by its distinctive Kashmiri weave and for being made of fine shahtoosh or pashmina wool.

Contemporary variants include the pashmina and shahtoosh shawls (often mononymously referred to simply as the pashmina and shahtoosh). In the late 20th century, they evolved to middle-class popularity through generic cashmere products (rather than the higher-grade pashmina), and raffal, shawls woven in the Kashmiri style, but using thicker Merino wool. Originally designed as a covering for men in India, it has evolved in the popular cultures of India, Europe, and the United States as indicators of nobility and rank, heirlooms giving on a girl's coming-of-age and marriage, and subsequently, as artistic elements in interior design.

Valued for its warmth, light weight and characteristic buta design, the Kashmir shawl trade inspired the global cashmere industry. The shawl evolved into its high-grade, sartorial use in the 13th century and was used in the 16th century by Mughal and Iranian emperors, both personally and for honouring members of their durbar. In the late 18th century, it arrived in Britain, and then in France, where its use by Queen Victoria and Empress Joséphine popularised it as a symbol of exotic luxury and status. The Kashmir shawl has since become a toponym for the Kashmir region itself (cashmere, named after Kashmir), inspiring mass-produced imitation industries in India and Europe, and popularising the buta motif, today known as the Paisley motif after the factories in Paisley, Renfrewshire, Scotland that sought to replicate it.

== Definition ==
The principal aspects of the shawl are its distinctive Kashmiri weaving technique and fine wool. However, the Kashmir shawl's definition has varied in time and place, depending on various factors such as the material used and its cost, the method of construction, the intended use, and the status of the wearer. Today, shahtoosh shawls are no longer made because of a ban on the trade of products made from the Tibetan antelope.

The definition of the Kashmir shawl has differed in India and in the West. In India, the shawl was worn by men, with the fineness of the shawl indicating nobility or royal favour. In the West, depending on the fashion of the moment, the Kashmir shawl represented different types of commodities, originally worn by men, but thereafter by women and then as decorative items in interior design. The definition has been confused through fakery and imitation. Scholars, vendors and journalists have sometimes mistakenly used the words cashmere and pashmina synonymously, or assumed that they are the same because they derive from the same animal. In reality, pashmina is a particularly fine form of cashmere, so all pashmina is cashmere, but not all cashmere is pashmina. In the late 19th century AD, weavers who had migrated to Punjab set up an imitation industry, applying the Kashmiri technique to Merino wool. The resulting shawls were called raffal, and have been classified by some as a species of Kashmir shawls, though the thicker wool means that they lack the distinctive lightness characteristic of the traditional Kashmir shawl. More recently, in the late 1990s, western European and American sellers adopted the more exotic word pashmina to sell plain-weave shawls made from generic cashmere. As a result, the associations with pashmina went from exclusive high fashion to middle-class popularity in 2000.

=== Material ===
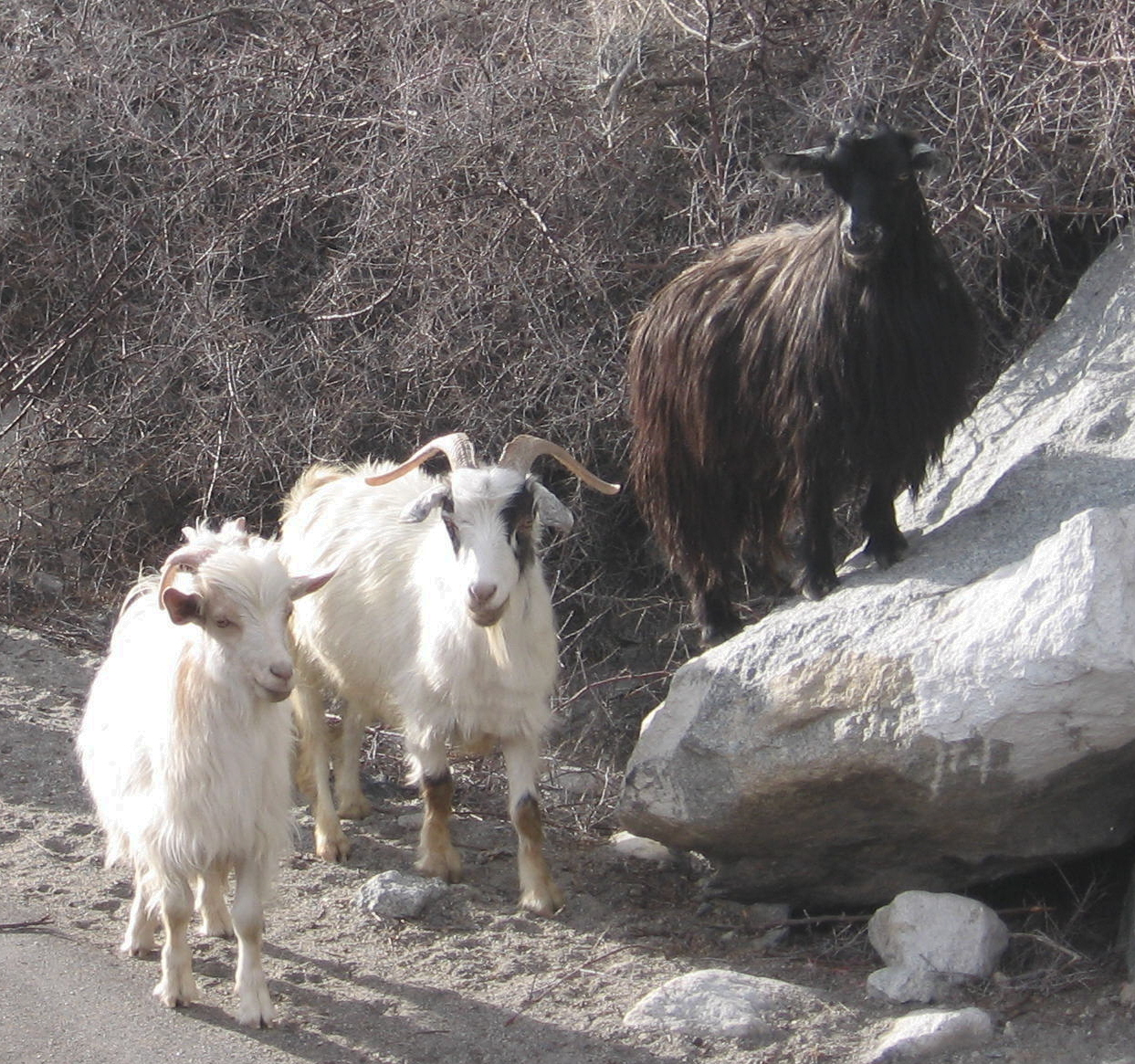
Pashmina goats in Ladakh

Kashmir shawls are traditionally made either of shahtoosh or pashmina. Shahtoosh wool comes from the fine hairs on the underbelly of the Tibetan antelope. Cashmere derives its name from the home of the Kashmir shawl, and is often incorrectly equated with pashmina. Pashmina and cashmere both come from the Changthangi goat, but pashmina is made from a fine subset of cashmere ranging from 12–16 microns, whereas generic cashmere ranges from 12–21 microns.

Types of wool by fineness
Type of wool	Diameter (μm)
Shahtoosh	10–12
Pashmina	12–16
Cashmere	12–21
Merino wool	18–24

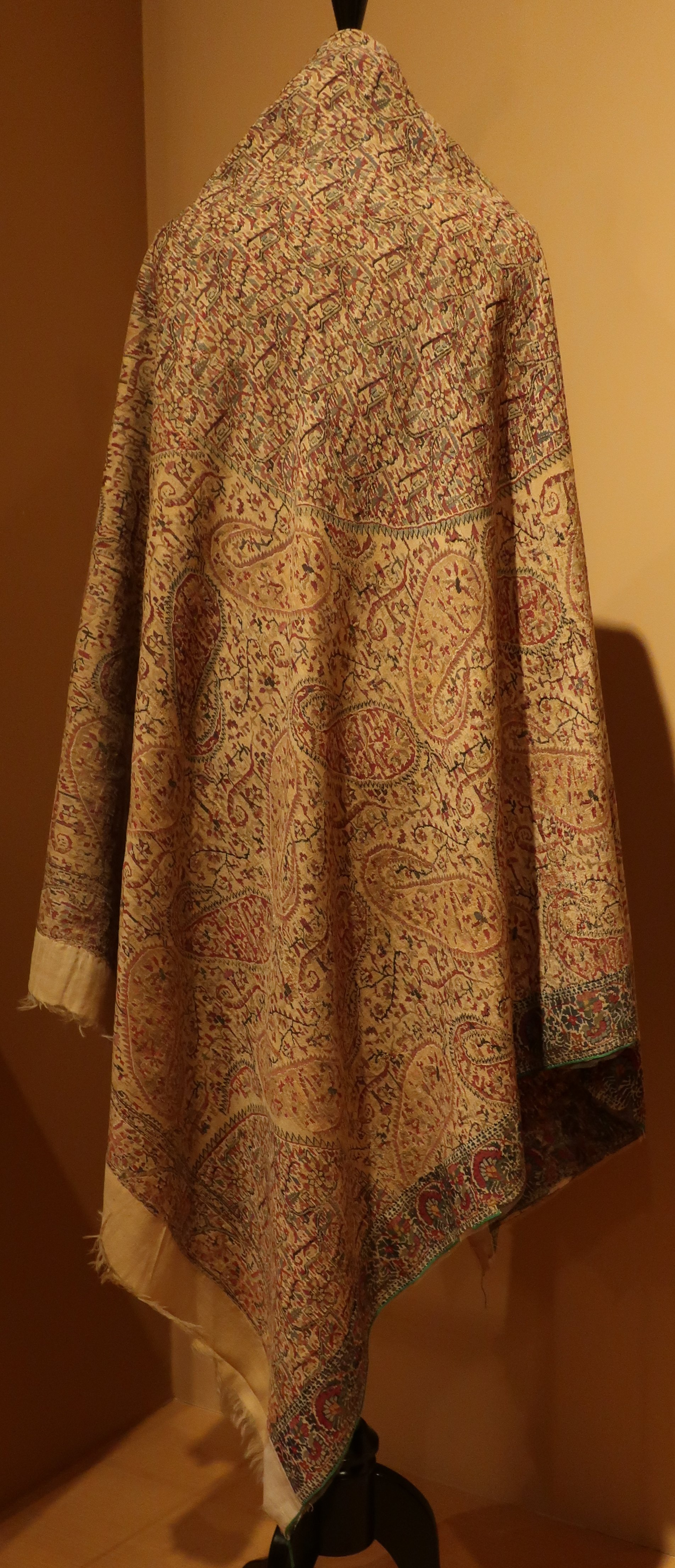
A 19th-century Kani shawl

Shahtoosh shawls are made from the hair of the Tibetan antelope which averaging 7–10 microns in diameter, is the finest hair in the world. These derived only from wild animals, grown during the harsh winters and rubbed off on rocks and shrubs in the summer, from where they were collected for weaving. As the fineness of a shawl in India was traditionally seen as a mark of nobility, they were historically reserved for members of the Mughal aristocracy. In the mid-eighteenth century, they became popular after their use by Queen Victoria of the United Kingdom and Empress Joséphine of France. In Mughal times, they became known as "ring shawls", for being extremely light, and fine enough that a one metre by two-metre shawl could be pulled whole through a finger ring. They remain known this way today. They today serve as status symbol, valued on average between USD $2,000 and $3,000, but for up to $15,000. Today, the export of shahtoosh shawls is banned under CITES and their production and sale banned under wildlife protection laws in India, China and Nepal. Domestic laws in the US prevent their sale.

=== Design ===
==== Kani shawl ====
The standard design of Kashmir shawl is the Kani shawl, named after the Kanihama village where it was originally produced. It is distinctive for using a variant of the "twill tapestry technique", referred to as such because of its similarity to European tapestry weaving techniques. However, it differs from tapestry weaving because the loom is horizontal instead of vertical, and its operation is closer to brocading. Kashmiri weavers used a distinctive technique, passing a weft over-and-under two warps. Using discontinuous wefts, it varied the weft colour and created distinct colour areas identical on both faces of the fabric. This also facilitated the creation of complex patterns like the buta to be woven onto the shawls.

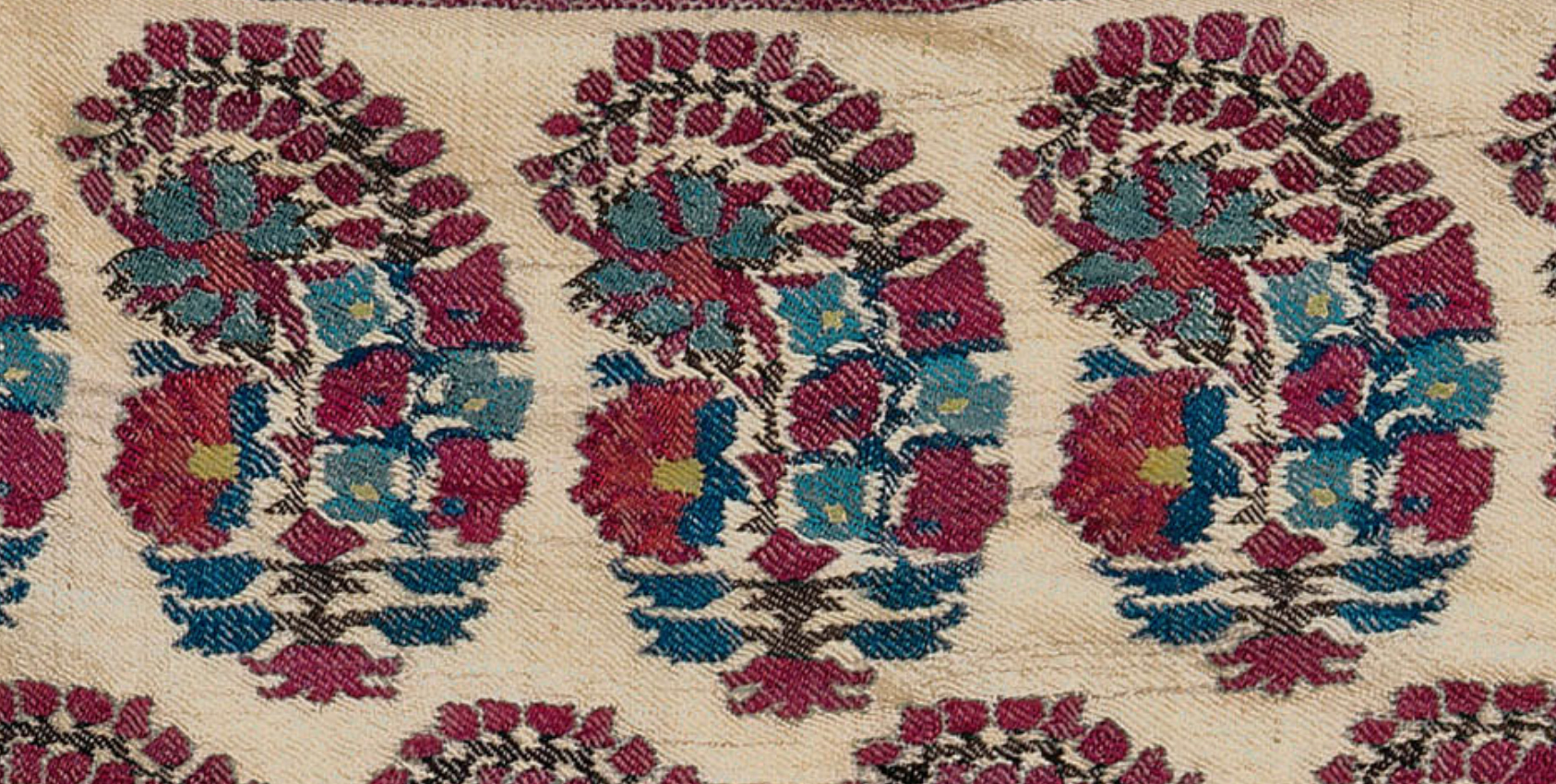
The buta design on an 18th-century Kashmiri shawl

==== Paisley shawl ====
The Kashmir shawl is closely associated with the Paisley shawl. The paisley design, originating in the buta, derives its name from the town of Paisley in Scotland, which became famous in the early 19th century for its imitation Kashmir shawls with the buta motif. After 1850, many English speakers used to refer to any shawl with the buta design, Kashmiri or otherwise, as a Paisley shawl. Missing fundamentals of the craftsmanship, imitations such as the Angola were short-lived.

== History ==
The origins of the Kashmir shawl are a matter of historical debate. The earliest known mentions of an established shawl weaving industry date back to the 11th century AD. The industry was probably older but some have suggested that Kashmir shawls were famous as far back as in the 3rd century BC, in Ashoka's reign. In earlier times, shawls were used as a warm protective garment against cold weather. By the 13th century, Kashmir shawls had risen in status and quality and were commonly used as fashion statements. Shawls were marketed towards the ruling elite and foreign markets. In the 14th century AD, the industry was energised by the enthusiastic patronage of Sultan Zain-ul-Abidin of Kashmir.

=== 16th to 18th centuries ===
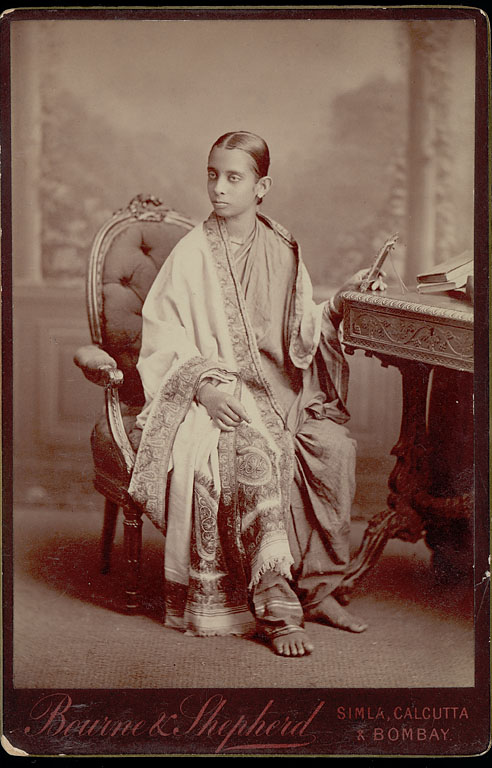
Hindu woman from Bombay wearing a Kashmir shawl

In 1526, Babur (1483–1530) founded the Mughal Empire in India, and established the practice of giving khil'at (or "robes of honour", typically made of expensive fabric) to members of their durbar to indicate high service, great achievement, or royal favour. Under Babur, the Mughal khil'at was a set of clothes, which could include a turban, long coat, gown, fitted jacket, sash, shawl, trousers, shirt, and scarf. One or all of these could be made of pashmina and embroidered in gold cloth. In 1586, Kashmir was conquered by Babur's grandson Akbar. In Akbar's time, a pair of Kashmir shawls were an expected part of khil'at ceremonies. Akbar was also known for his love for shahtoosh shawls. After conquering Kashmir, he introduced a requirement that they be woven into lengths long enough for the full body, spawning the jamawar shawl. Until the rule of Shah Jahan (1592–1666), shahtoosh shawls were reserved for Mughal royalty, with only the more common pashmina shawls being gifted to nobility as khil'at.

From the 16th to the early 20th centuries, the Safavid, Zand and Qajar emperors of Iran wore Kashmir shawl fabrics and gifted Kashmir shawls as khil'at within their political and religious practices. In the Iranian elite, both men and women wore Kashmir shawl fabric as fitted clothes, rather than as a loose covering of the upper body.

In the 17th and 18th centuries, political upheaval in Kashmir disrupted the shawl trade. Kashmir came under Afghan and subsequently Sikh rule. In 1819, Ranjit Singh of Punjab conquered Kashmir. In the 1840s, Ranjit Singh's court was lavishly decorated with Kashmir shawls and shawl cloth. He encouraged Kashmiri weavers to settle in Punjabi cities, and used Kashmir shawl cloth to pay allowances to his followers, to grant robes of honour, and to send gifts to other rulers, including the British.

=== In the Western world ===
The Kashmir shawl arrived in Europe towards the second half of the 18th century AD, by English and French individuals active in the Indian subcontinent. These officials would gift Kashmir shawls to their wives and other high-status women. Although these shawls later came to be worn exclusively by women, they were originally worn exclusively by men, in line with the Kashmiri tradition.

These shawls acquired near-mythical status following their patronage by Queen Victoria of the United Kingdom and Empress Joséphine of France, the latter of whom went on to own a collection of between three and four hundred Kashmir shawls. Article 10 of the Treaty of Amritsar (1846) which created the princely state of Jammu and Kashmir, required the Maharaja of Kashmir Gulab Singh to send three pairs of Kashmiri shawls to the British government every year, to be given to Queen Victoria. Even before becoming Empress of India, Queen Victoria adopted the Mughal practice of gifting shawls to visiting dignitaries.

==== In 19th century England ====
In nineteenth-century English writing, despite the fact that shawls were worn by men, Kashmiri shawls became coded as women's luxuries. They acquired the status of heirlooms, worn by a girl on her marriage and coming-of-age, and as heirlooms that women would inherit rather than purchase. Their romantic but inaccurate associations with a "mysterious and unchanging East" were encouraged by popular journalism.

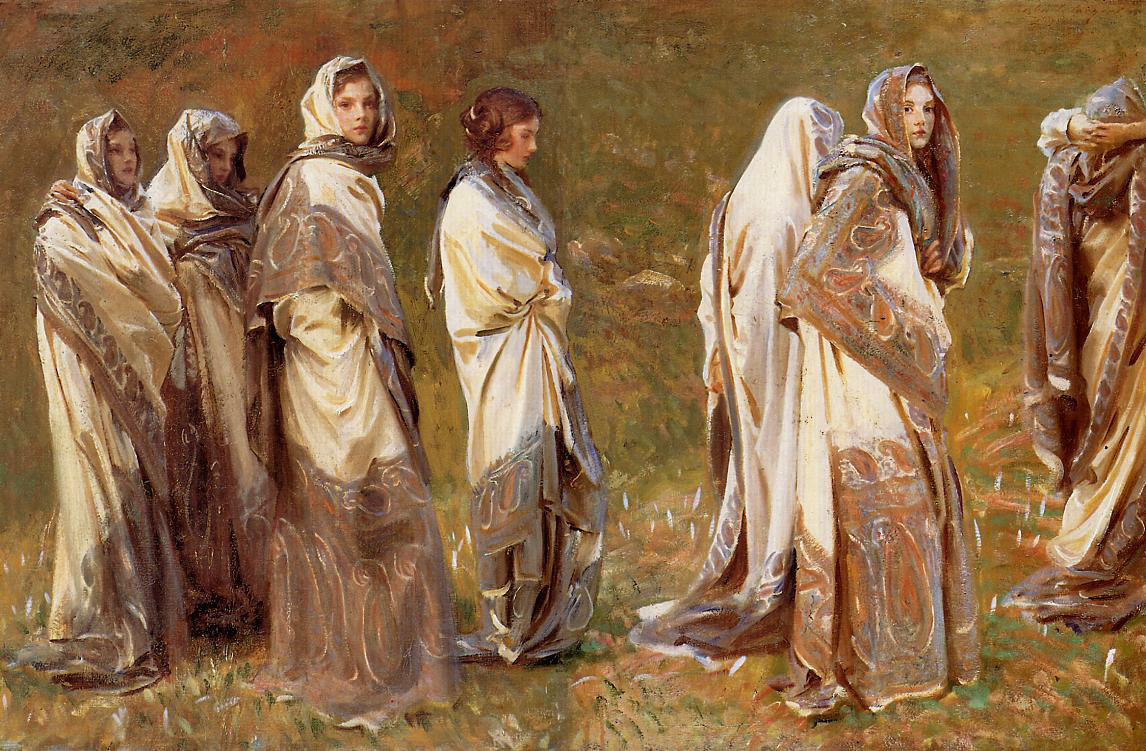
Painting by John Singer Sargent of women in Kashmir shawls

In 1852, Charles Dickens wrote in the magazine Household Words that "if an article of dress could be immutable, it would be the (Kashmir) shawl; designed for eternity in the unchanging East; copied from patterns which are the heirlooms of caste; and woven by fatalists, to be worn by adorers of the ancient garment, who resent the idea of the smallest change". By the 1780s, there were imitation textile centres in Norwich, Edinburgh, and Lyon attempting to recreate the Kashmir shawl. By the 19th century, the original Kashmir shawl (and to some extent the European imitations) were a fashion staple for Western high society. Over time, the shawls began to be seen as a ritual casting off for the European man returning from India, restoring himself to England and Englishness by handing to a woman a garment commonly understood in India to be worn by men. Kashmir shawls thereby came to play different roles in the two societies: a status symbol for Indian men, and a luxury garment for European noblewomen. In Vanity Fair, Jos Sedley returns from Bengal with a "white Cashmere shawl", an indication that it was an original, as imitations were generally patterned. Patterned shawls could take up to 18 months to make and were therefore more likely to be worn by nobility than the prosperous middle class.

Kashmir shawls came to evoke fairytale status and marriage for bourgeois women. In Elizabeth Gaskell's 1854 novel North and South, Margaret, the heroine, modelled a Kashmir shawl, with Gaskell describing the shawl as having a "spicy Eastern smell", "soft feel" and "brilliant colour". When Margaret met her future husband, Gaskell described her attire as completed by "a large Indian shawl which hung about her in heavy folds and which she wore as an empress wears her drapery".

As heirlooms, Kashmir shawls came to be seen as items of great value. Since English law restricted women's abilities to inherit land, the Kashmir shawl served as an item of high exchange value that a woman could carry.

==== In 19th century France ====
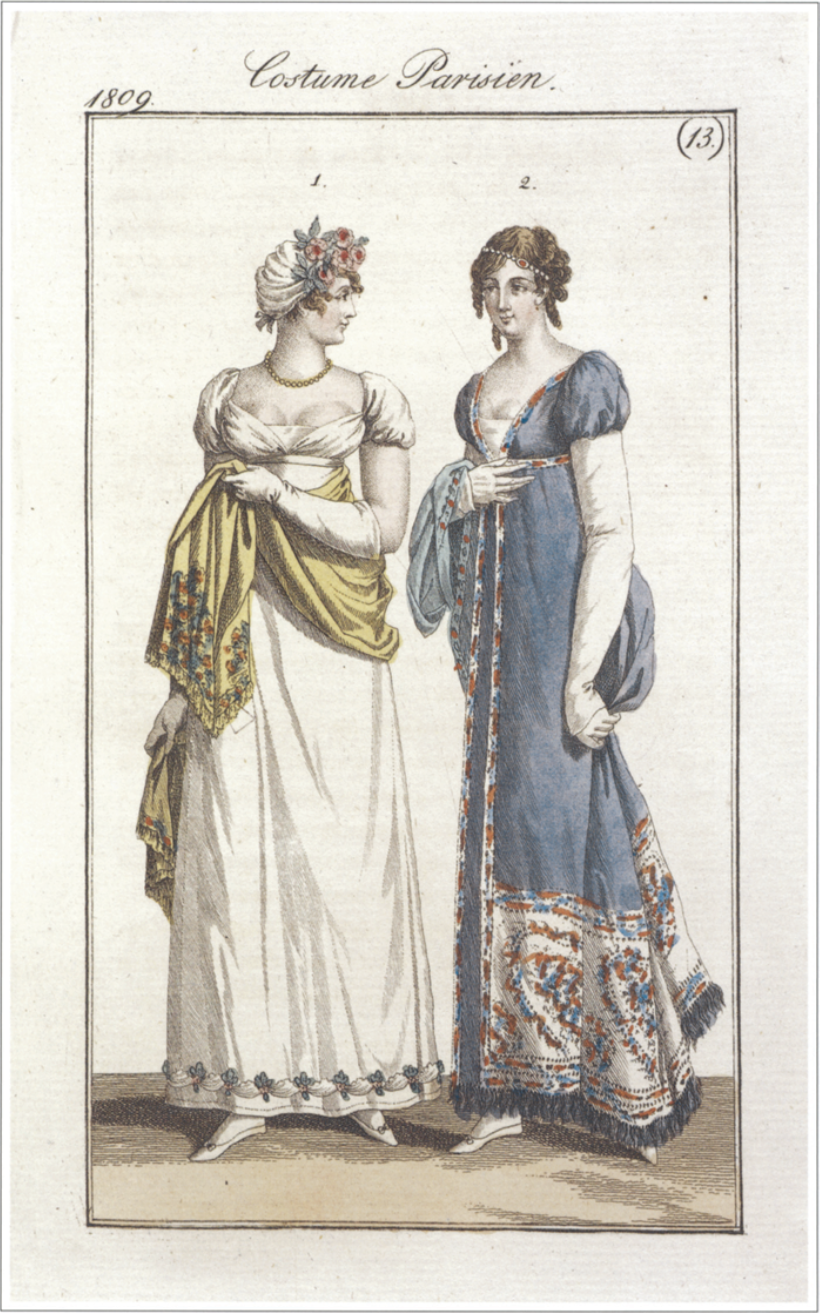
In this French fashion plate, the woman on the right wears a gown made from Kashmir shawl fabric and an apple-green Kashmir shawl, with white gloves, and white sandals.

The Kashmir shawl first appeared in French fashion magazines and portraits in 1790, but only arrived in significant quantities after the French campaign in Egypt and Syria (1798–1801). When initially presented with them Empress Joséphine wrote to her son Eugène, "I find them hideous. Their great advantage lies in their lightness, but I doubt very much if they will ever become fashionable." However, she changed her mind quickly and eventually collected three or four hundred shawls, some made of lace, gauze and muslin, but most being Kashmiri shawls. French magazines were attentive to her dress styles and reinterpreted in fashion plates, giving the shawl widespread influence. Through her enthusiastic example, the Kashmir shawl gained status as a fashion icon in Paris. The cashmere shawls suited the French well, providing the needed warmth, while adding visual interest to white French gowns through the traditional teardrop buta pattern and discreet floral motifs. It became a symbol of French bourgeois status from the Bourbon Restoration (1815–48) through the Second French Empire (1852–70). As a class marker, they fulfilled 19th century French tastes because they looked rich, had extensive ornamentation, artistic qualities, and were made of expensive raw materials. Just as in England, they acquired the status of wedding gifts. Unmarried women were discouraged from wearing Kashmir shawls because doing so would "lead people to believe that they are possessed of an unbridled love of luxury and deprive themselves of the pleasure of receiving such finery from a husband".

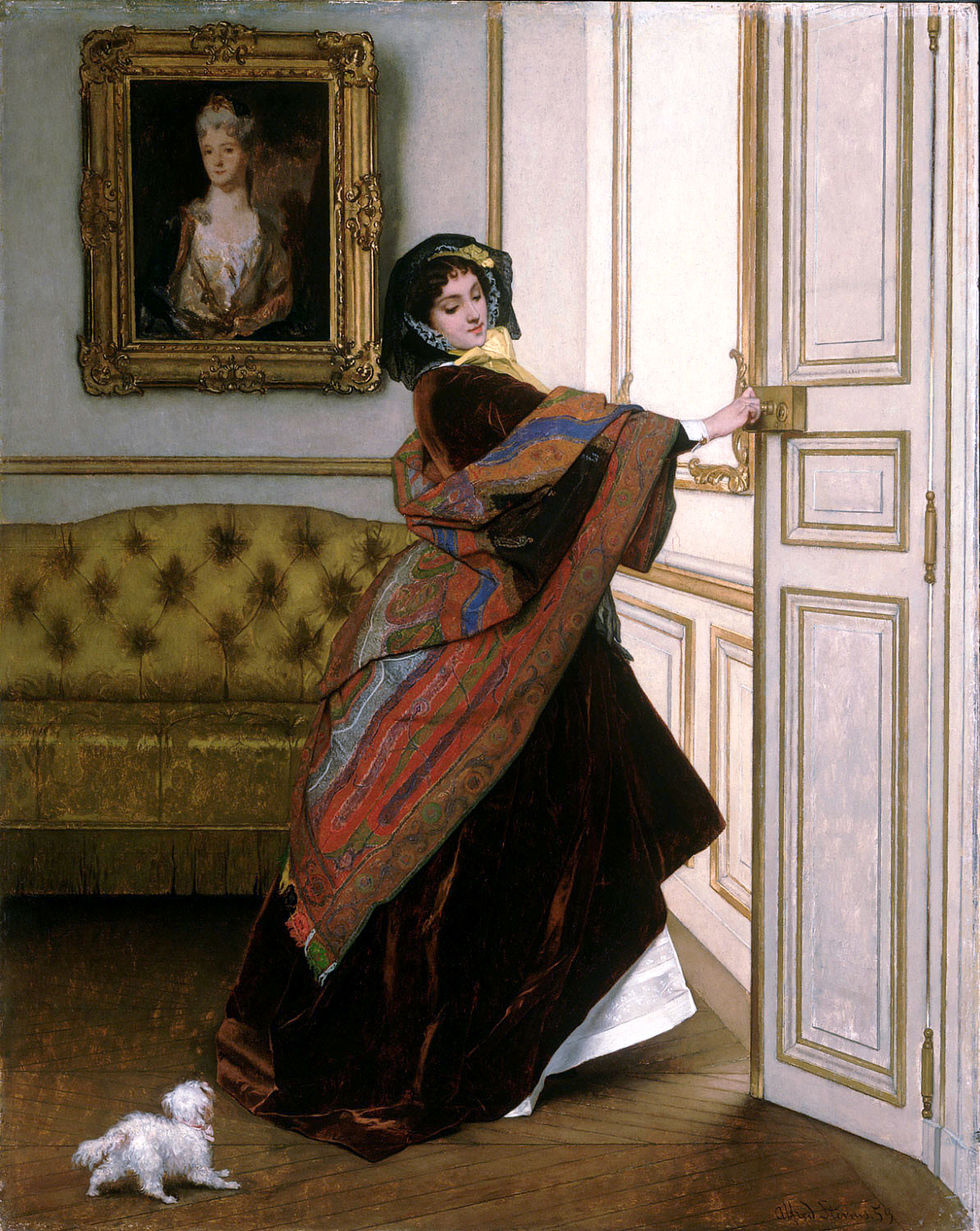
Alfred Stevens' 1859 painting is an example of the Kashmir shawl's continuing popularity in the Second Empire era.

==== In 19th century America ====
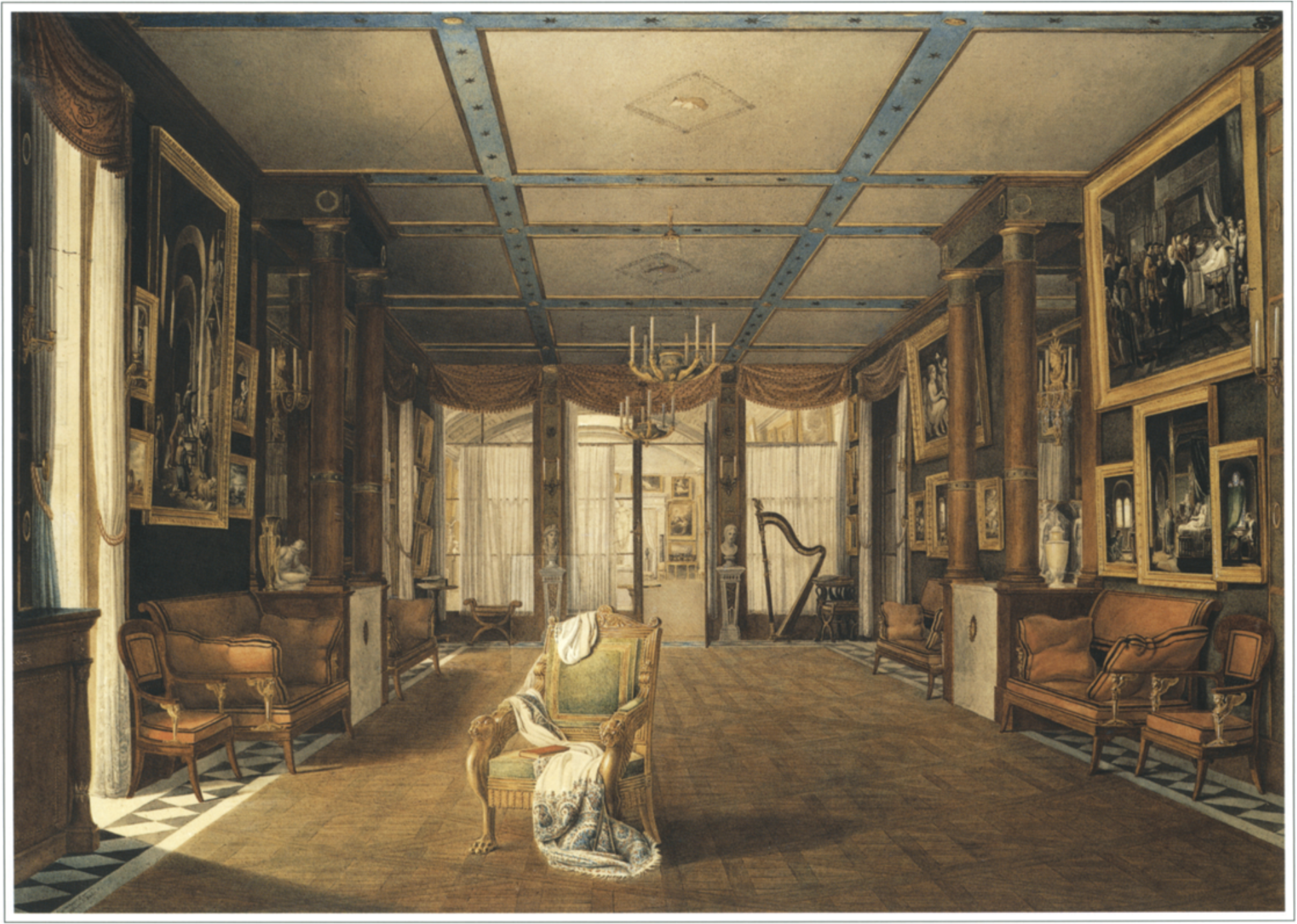
A painting of Château de Malmaison, the residence of the Empress Joséphine; a Kashmir shawl in characteristic buta design is draped over the fauteuil.

Around the time the Kashmir shawl became fashionable in Britain, Euro-American women on the northeastern coast of the United States began wearing them. Shawl fashion in the United States followed western European fashion trends. Shawls were popular holiday presents throughout the 1860s, and Indian shawls were considered wise purchases in 1870. By the end of the 1870s, however, imitation shawls began to eclipse the genuine Indian shawls in advertisements. Between the 1880s and World War I (1914–1918), wealthy European and Euro-American women began using Kashmir shawls as decorative pieces on pianos instead of on themselves.

=== Influences ===
The paisley design, originating in the Indian buta, derives its name from Paisley, Scotland, where imitation shawls were manufactured. In French, the word cachemire refers to the paisley's teardrop-shape itself, because of the close links between the pattern and the material. A talcum powder named "Cashmere Bouquet" is still sold by an American mail order business which specializes in commodity nostalgia, with an advertisement situating the product in the 1870s. Over time, repeated European and Euro-American usage disassociated the word "cashmere" from its geographical origin and may have weakened its link to the "exotic". China and Mongolia have become geographical references for cashmere sweaters in thirty-eight U.S. mail order catalogs such as Lands' End.

== Sources ==
- Gaskell, Elizabeth Cleghorn (5 May 2010). North and South. London. ISBN 978-1-4070-9088-7. OCLC 881282240.
