= Changthangi =

Goat breed of Ladakh, India

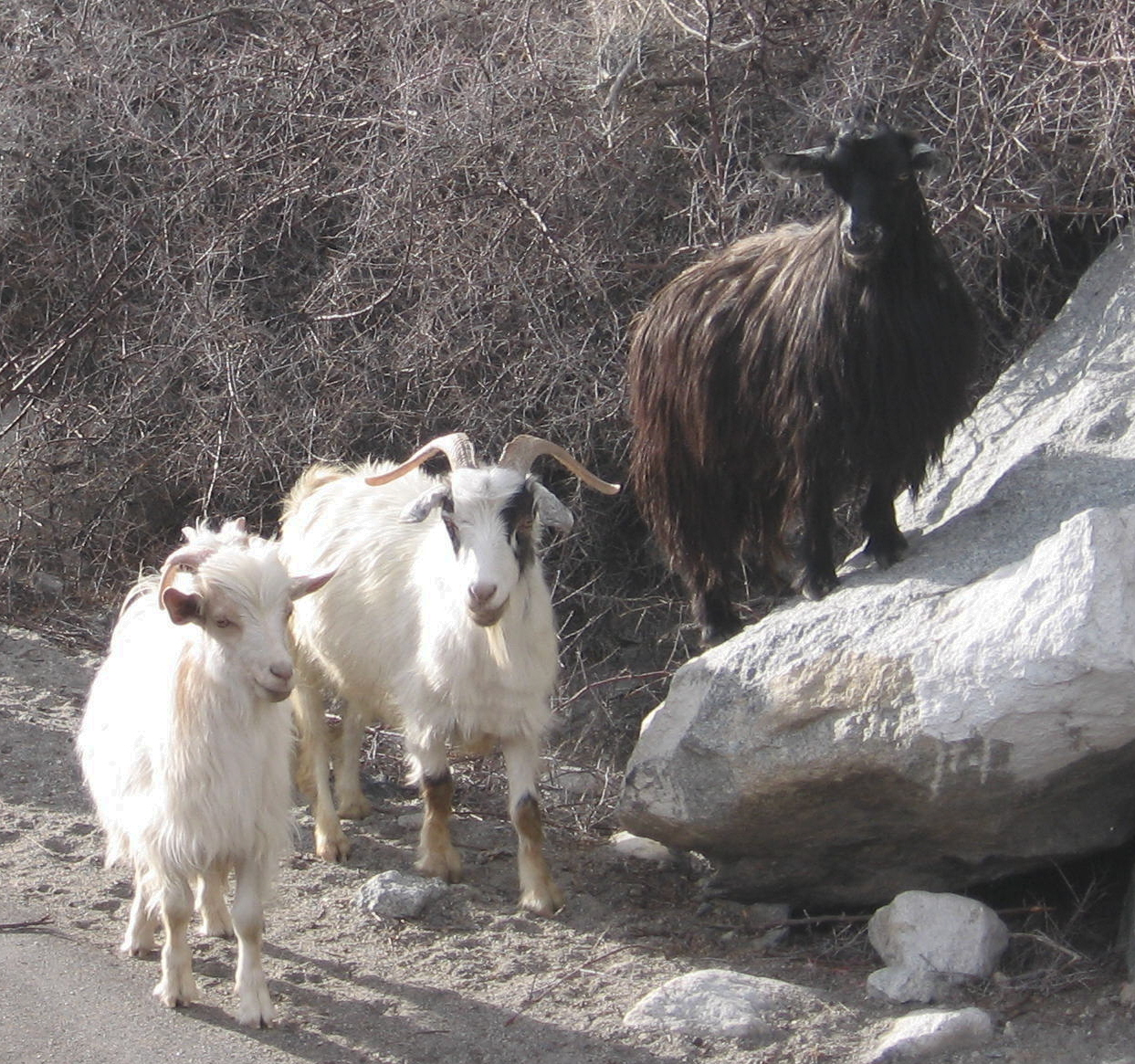
- Conservation status: FAO (2007): not at risk; DAD-IS (2020): not at risk
- Other names: Changra; Kashmiri; Ladakh Pashmina
- Country of origin: India
- Distribution: Ladakh
- Use: pashmina; meat; pack animal

Traits
- Weight: Male: 20.37 kg; Female: 19.75 kg
- Height: 49–52 cm
- Skin colour: white or light brown
- Coat: usually white, also black, brown or grey
- Horn status: horned in both sexes
- Goat; Capra aegagrus hircus

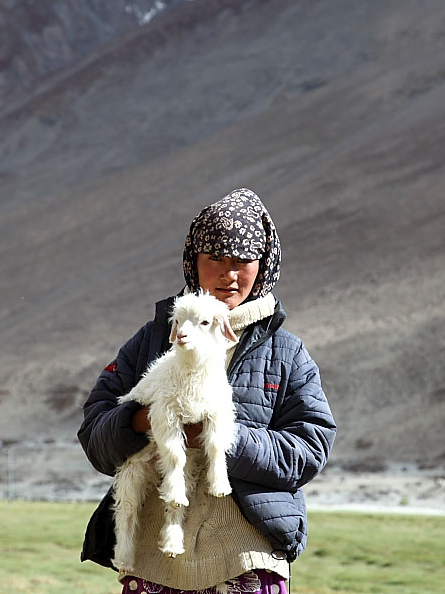
Changpa nomad with a kid

The Changthangi or Changpa is a breed of cashmere goat native to the high plateaus of Ladakh in northern India. It is closely associated with the nomadic Changpa people of the Changthang plateau. It may also be known as the Ladakh Pashmina or Kashmiri.

The intense cold of the region causes the goats to grow a thick undercoat, which is harvested to produce the fine pashmina grade of cashmere. In the twenty-first century the quality of the pashmina is threatened by global climate change; approximately three quarters of Indian pashmina production is from these goats. They are also used as pack animals and for meat.

== Description ==
These goats are generally domesticated and are reared by nomadic communities called the Changpa in the Changthang regions of Ladakh, including the Kharnak, Rupshu, Demchok/Skakjung and the Pangong Lake regions.

The goats survive on grass in Ladakh, where temperatures plunge to as low as −20 °C (−4.00 °F). These goats provide the wool for Kashmir's famous pashmina shawls. Shawls made from Pashmina wool are considered very fine, and are exported worldwide.

The Changthangi goats have revitalised the poor economy of Changthang, Ladakh where the wool production generates more than $8 million a year.

Noori, the world's first cloned Pashmina goat, was cloned at the Faculty of Veterinary Sciences and Animal Husbandry of the Sher-e-Kashmir University of Agricultural Sciences and Technology of Kashmir (SKUAST) in Shuhama, 25 km east of Srinagar, on 15 March 2012.

== Characteristics ==
The Changthangi is a small goat, standing about 50 cm at the withers, and weighing on average approximately 20 kg. Both sexes are horned; the horns are large and twisted, and may reach a length of 55 cm. The ears are small and upright. The coat consists of an outer coat of long hair, and a thick undercoat of fine pashmina; it is commonly white, but can also be black, brown or grey. The skin is white or pale brown.

== See also ==
- Turfani pashm
