= Puttoo =

Type of camel or yak hair cloth

Puttoo was the coarse woolen cloth used in and before the 19th century in the Indian subcontinent. It was made of camel's hair or yak.

== Quality ==
Puttoo was a less expensive woolen material used by locals of hilly areas for their daily garments like shawls and chogas (long coats), often decorated with silk threads. Puttoo was softer than few contemporary varieties such as Sulung or Kerseymere. Although these woolen varieties were from the same animals, the difference was the wool's quality, maybe because it was classified or picked from specific body parts. Puttoo was a smaller width cloth, one piece (of 8-10 yards) was priced at Rupees three to seven only.

== Use ==
Puttoo was used for various winter clothing types, but it was primarily used for cheaper shawls and long coats, also called chogas. Sometimes the products were decorated with silk braid and lacework.

== See also ==
- Wool
- Thibet cloth
