= Buta (ornament) =

Pine cone-shaped motif in ornament

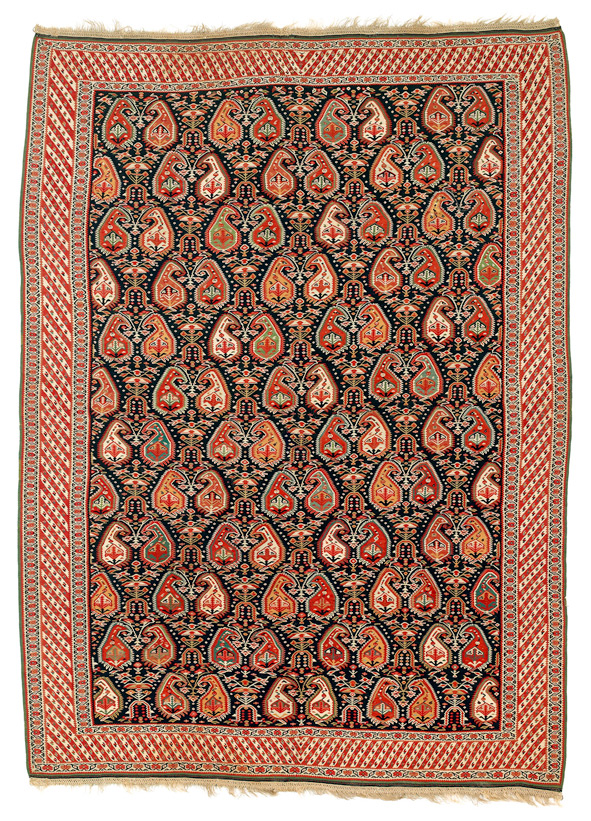
Sehna Kilim with boteh design, first half of 19th century

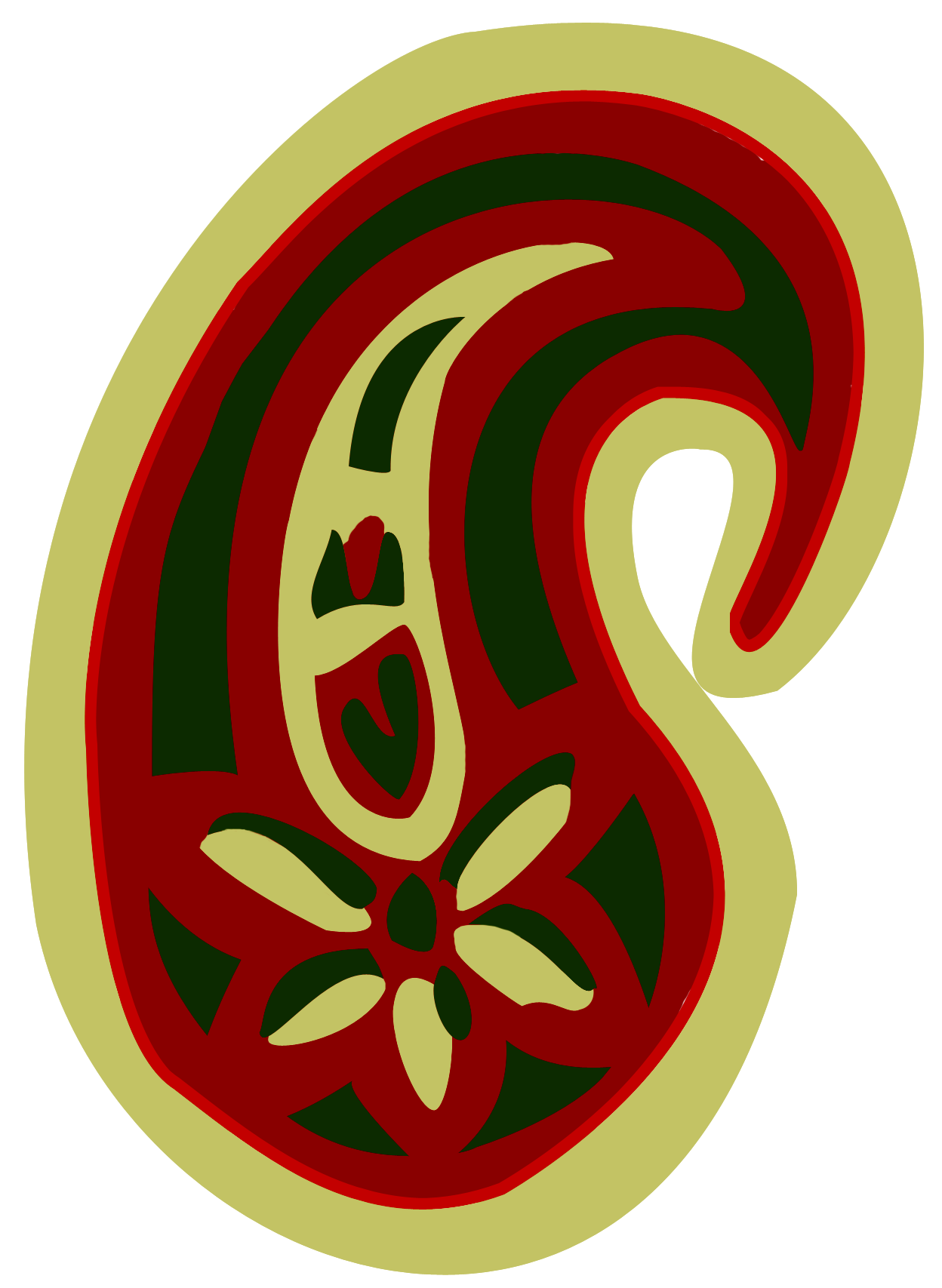
Boteh motif

The boteh (Persian: بوته), is an almond or pine cone-shaped motif in ornament with a sharp-curved upper end. This Persian pattern is one of the national symbols of Iran and also very common and called buta in India, Armenia, Azerbaijan, Turkey and other countries in the Persianate cultural sphere. In India, the shape is associated more with a mango than with a pine cone, and is called ambi, from āmra (Sanskrit: आम्र) meaning mango. By the 19th century, it spread to Europe via Kashmir shawls. By the 1860s, the shape and textiles utilizing the motif became known as Persian paisleys, as Paisley, Renfrewshire, Scotland became a major centre for the production of high-demand imitation boteh textiles that were crafted for a new audience of transatlantic consumers.

In Asian ornament, the boteh motifs are typically placed in orderly rows, though especially in India they may appear in a pattern in a variety of sizes, colours, and orientations, which is also characteristic of European paisley patterns.

Scholars believe the boteh is the convergence of a stylized floral spray and a cypress tree: a Zoroastrian symbol of life and eternity. The "bent" cedar is also a sign of strength and resistance but modesty. The floral motif originated in the Sasanian Empire and was later used in the Safavid Empire, and was a major textile pattern in Iran during the Qajar and Pahlavi eras. In these periods, the pattern was used to decorate royal regalia, crowns, and court garments, as well as textiles used by the general population. Persian and Central Asian designs usually range the motifs in orderly rows, with a plain background.

== Uses ==
The motifs can still be found on Persian carpets, Armenian carpets, Azerbaijani rugs, kalaghai shawls and textiles, paintings of decorative-applied arts of Greater Iran and also in decorations of Persian architectural monuments.

A Courtier with an Astrakhan Hat wearing Kaftan with the carefully detailed Buta pattern

It is woven using gold or silver threads on silk or other high quality textiles for gifts, for weddings and special occasions. In Iran and Uzbekistan, its use goes beyond clothing, with paintings, jewelry, frescoes, curtains, tablecloths, quilts, carpets, garden landscaping, and pottery also sporting the boteh design. In Uzbekistan the most frequently found item featuring the design is the traditional doʻppi caps.

In Tamil Nadu the manga maalai (mango necklace) with matching earrings is a traditional feature of bharathanatyam dance. It is a prominent design in Kanchipuram saris.

== Gallery ==
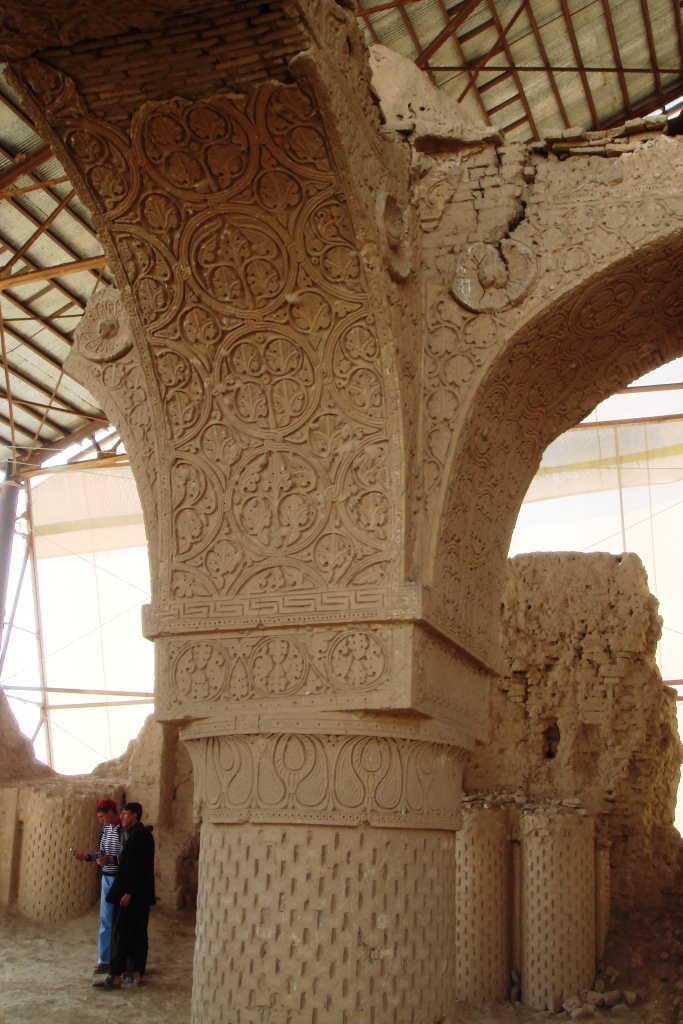
Usage of boteh pattern in Haji Piyada Mosquee, 9th century, Afghanistan

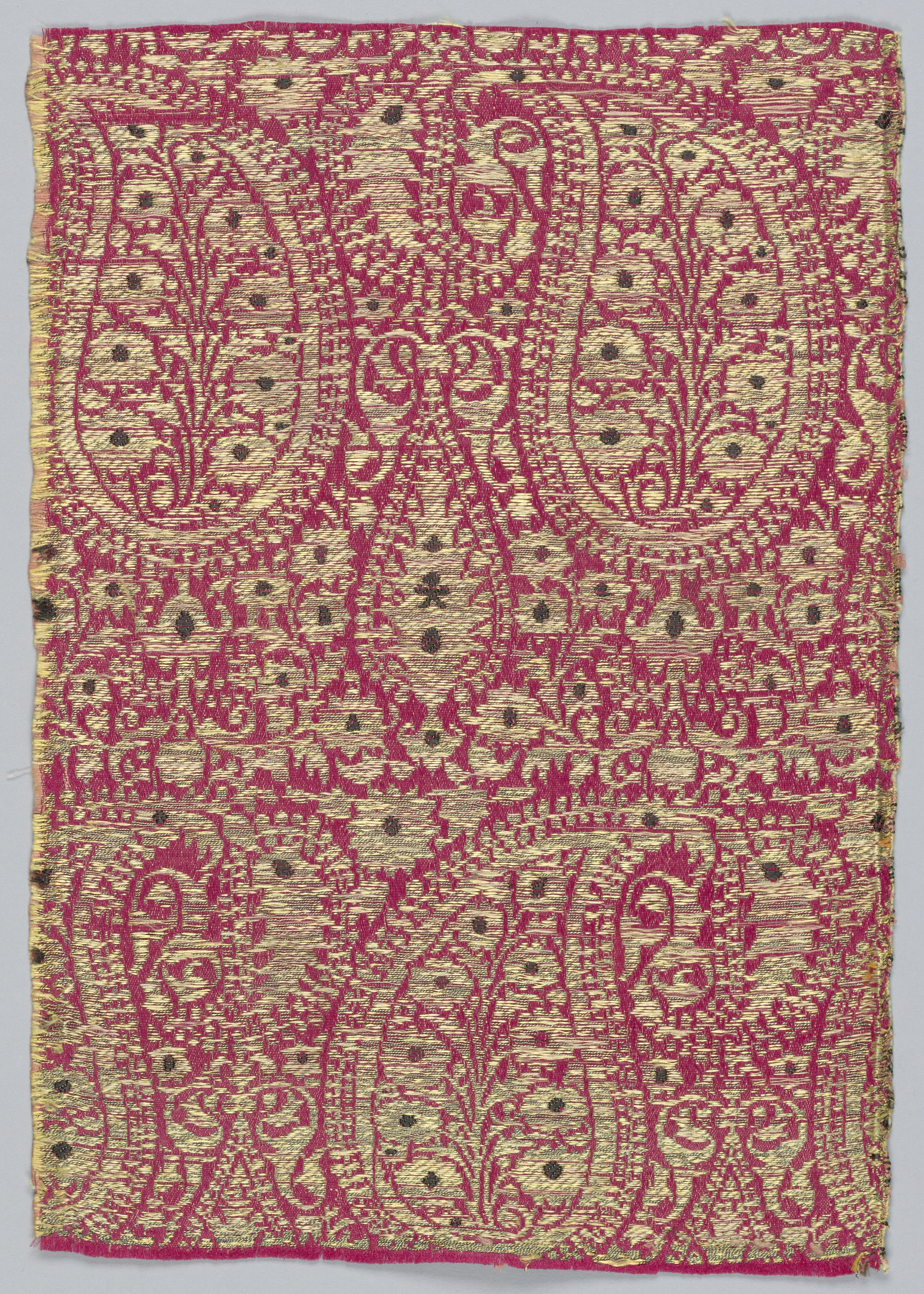
18th-century fragment of textile from Iran with boteh

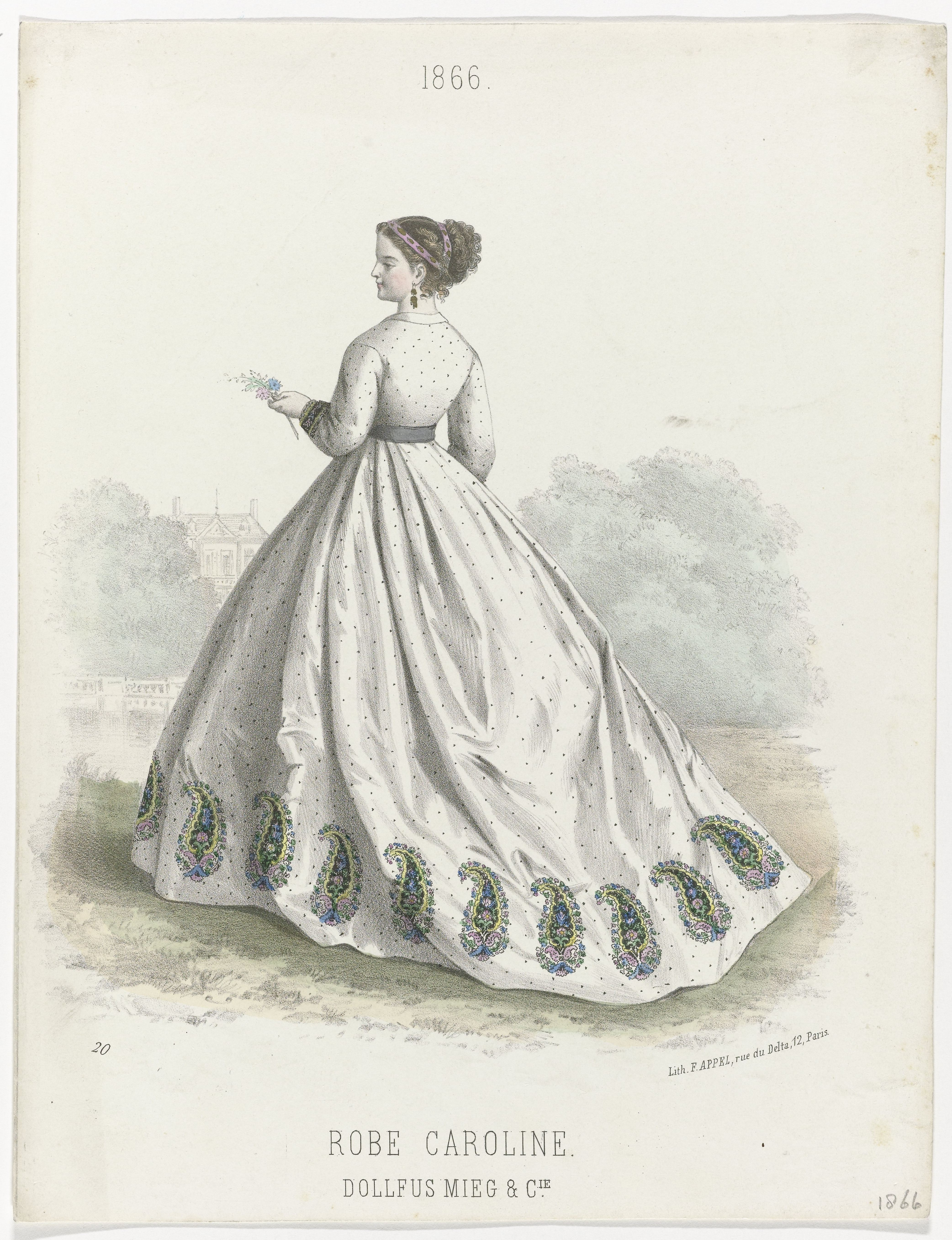
French dress with printed boteh in 1866

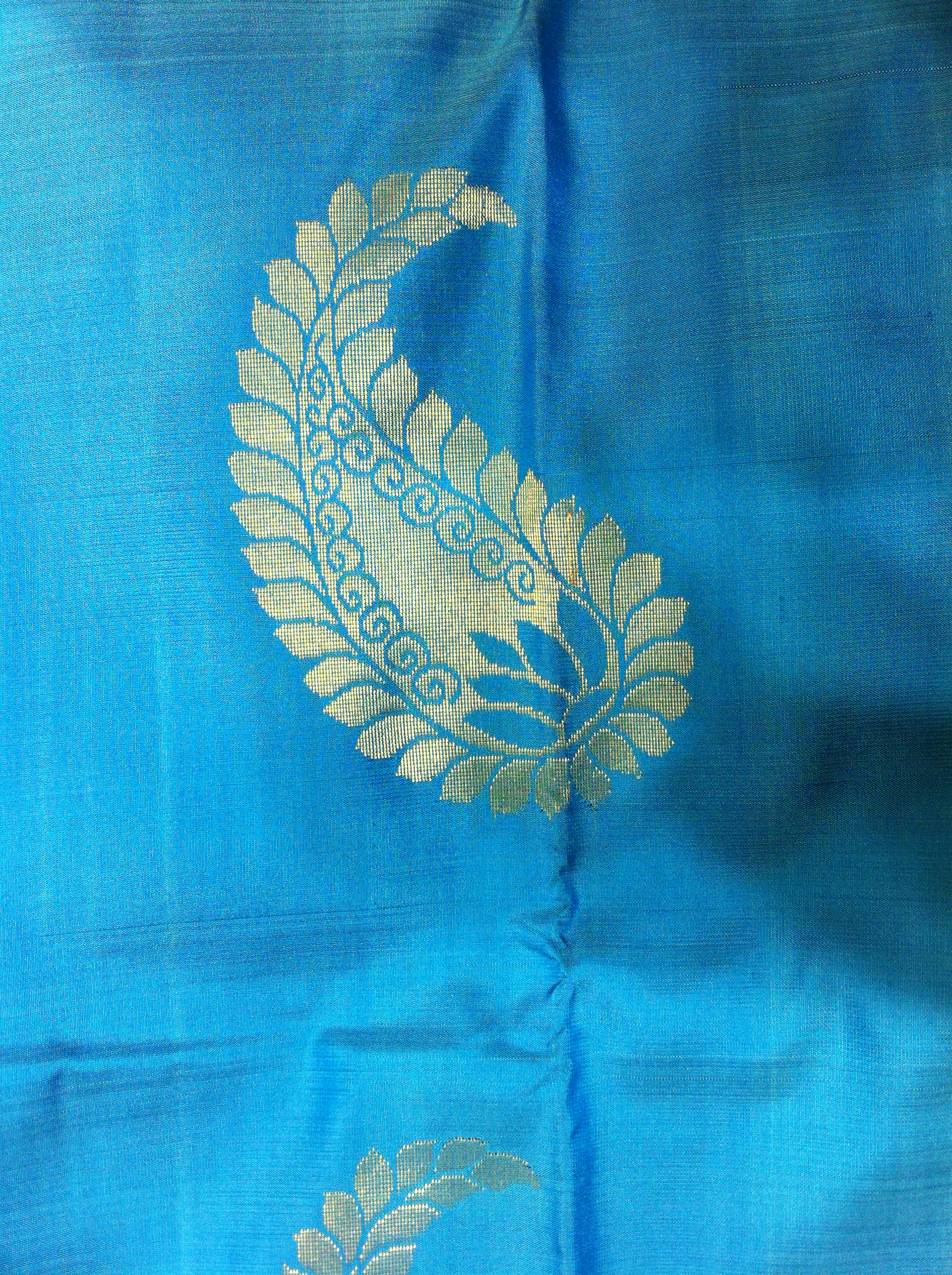
Modern silk sari with mankolam design, made in Kanchipuram

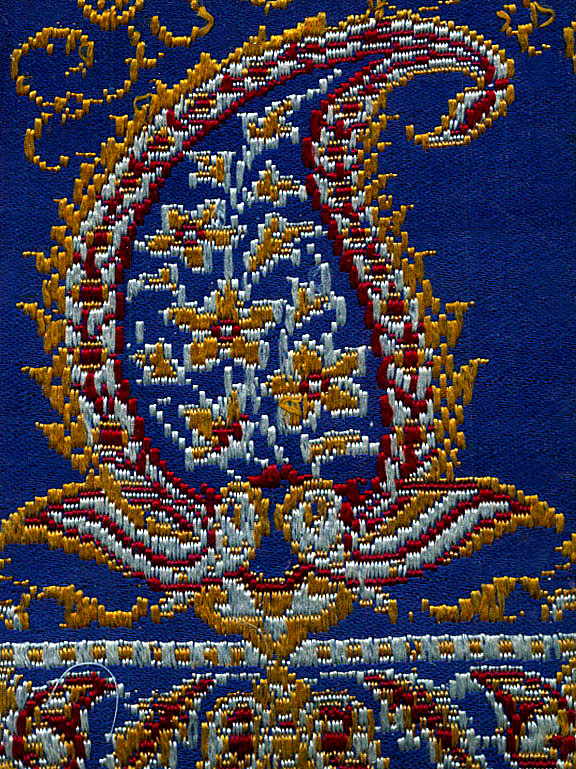
Persian silk brocade from the Pahlavi era

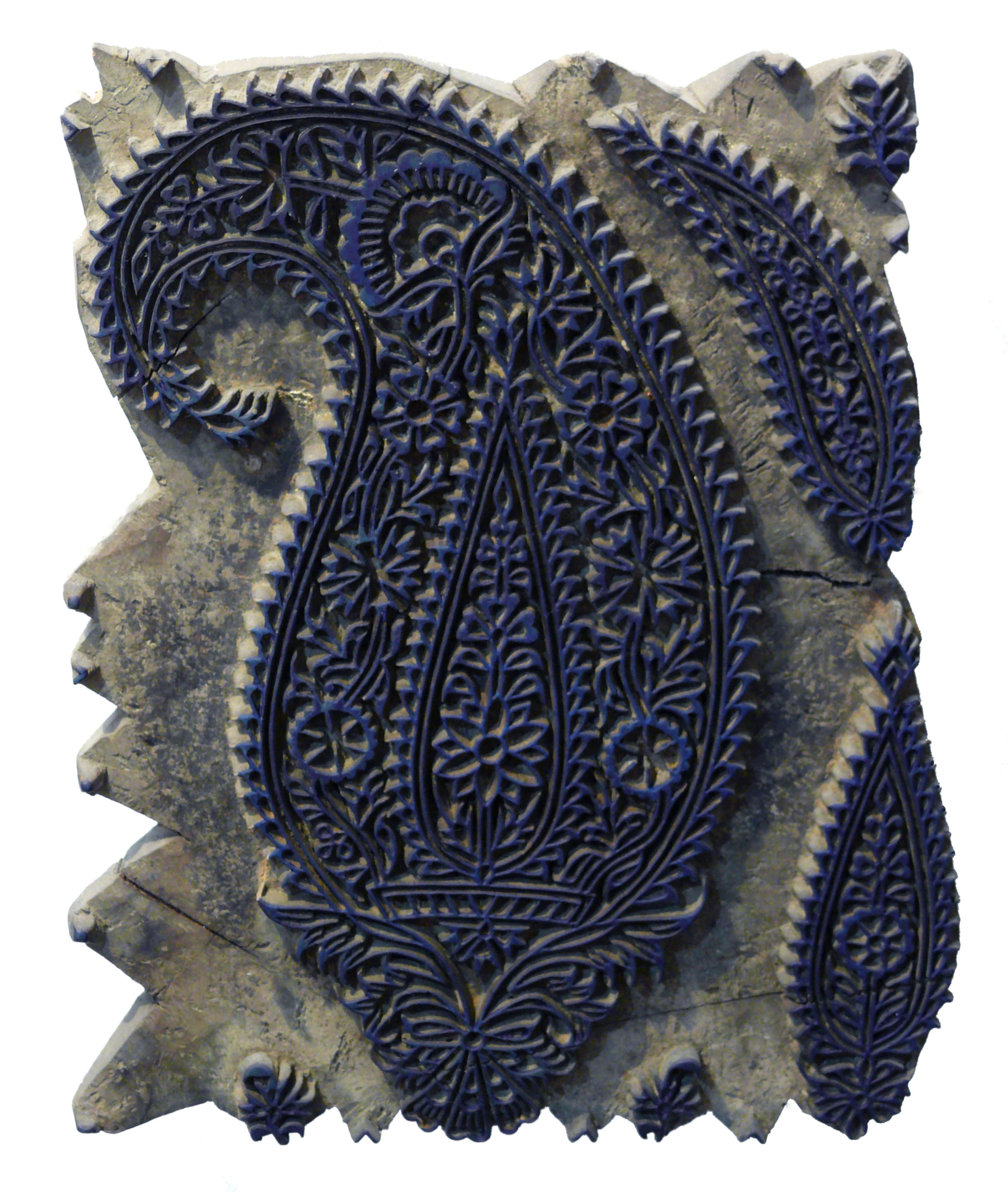
Wood handstamp for textile printing traditional "paisley" designs, Isfahan, Iran

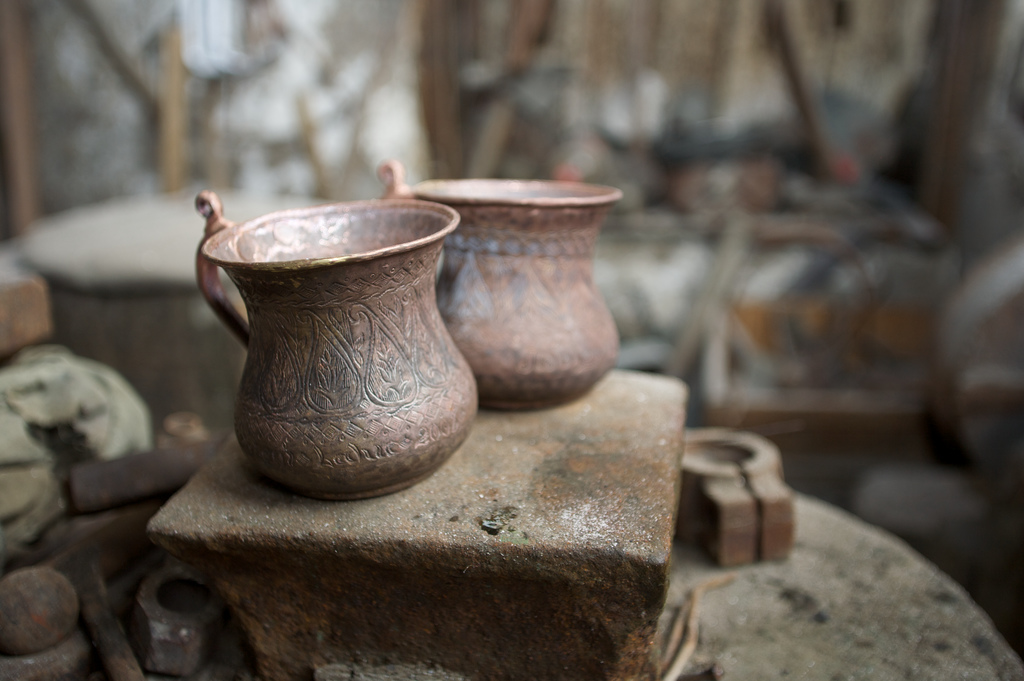
Buta on copper items in Lahij

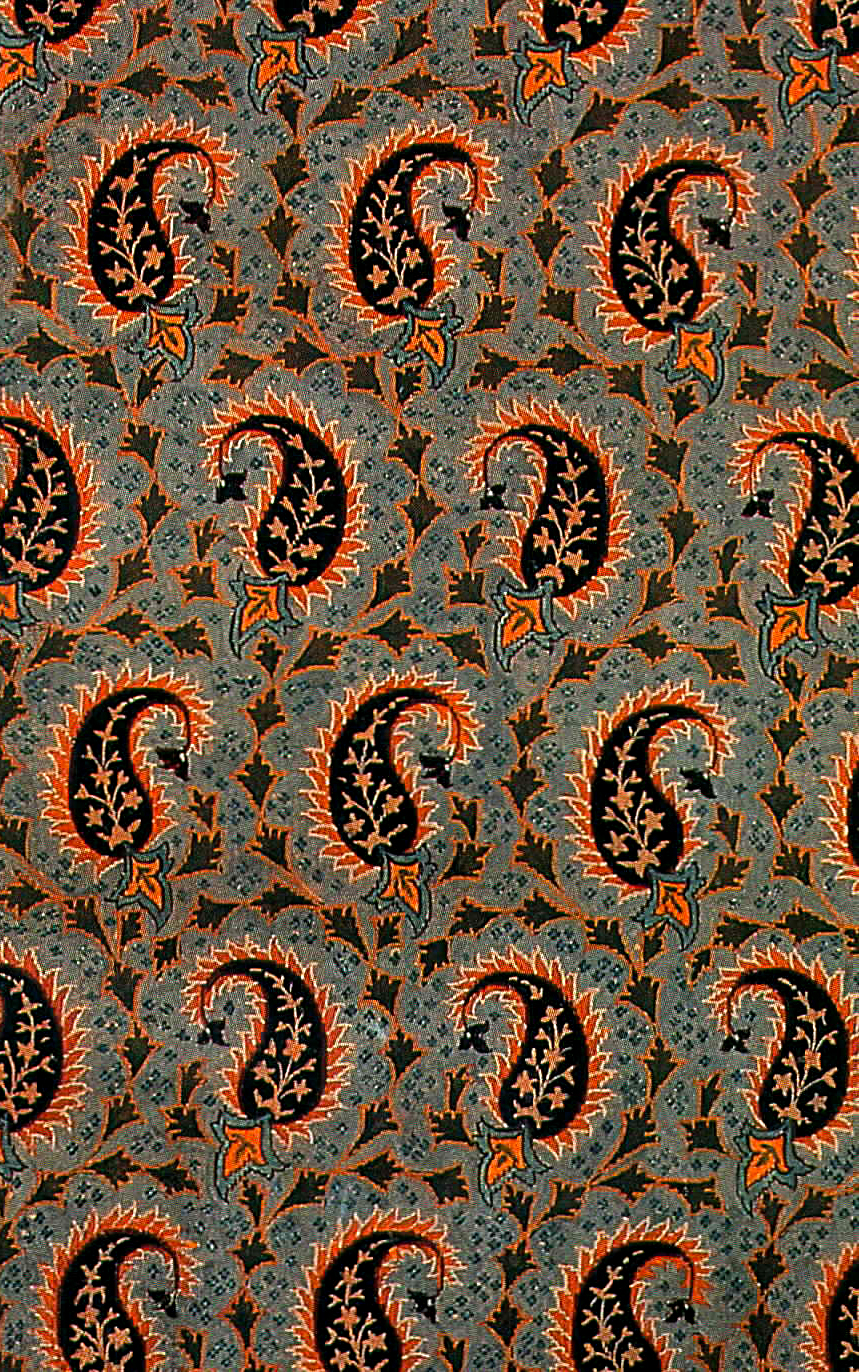
Persian silk brocade with golden thread (golabetoon), woven in 1939

== Sources ==
- F. Petri «Origin of the Book of the Dead Angient Egipt». 1926. June part 2 с 41-45
- С. Ашурбейли «Новые изыскания по истории Баку и Девичьей башни» Альманах искусств 1972 г, С.Ашурбейли «О датировке и назначении Гыз галасы в крепости» Элм. 1974 г.
