= Pashmina (material) =

Fine subset of cashmere wool

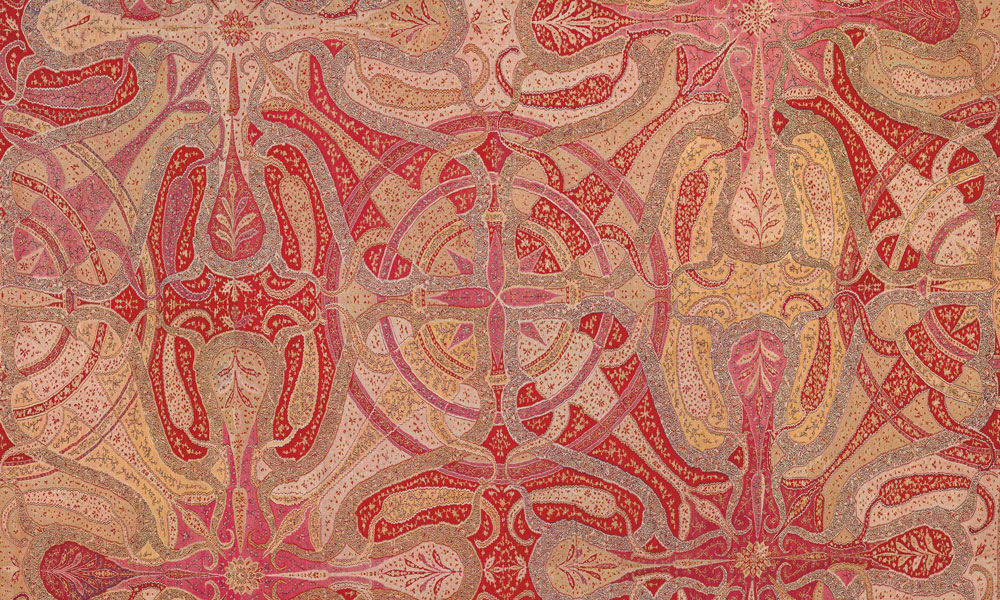
The Mandala Chandar (c. 1840, detail) is an unusual Kashmiri tantric moon shawl (chandar) with a mandala in the centre from which radiates zoomorphic tendrils, filled with multi-coloured millefleurs on a pink ground.

Pashmina (/pæʃˈmiːnə, pɑːʃ-/, also UK: /pʌʃ-/) refers to, depending on the source, the cashmere wool of the Changthangi cashmere goat, or fine Kashmiri cashmere wool.

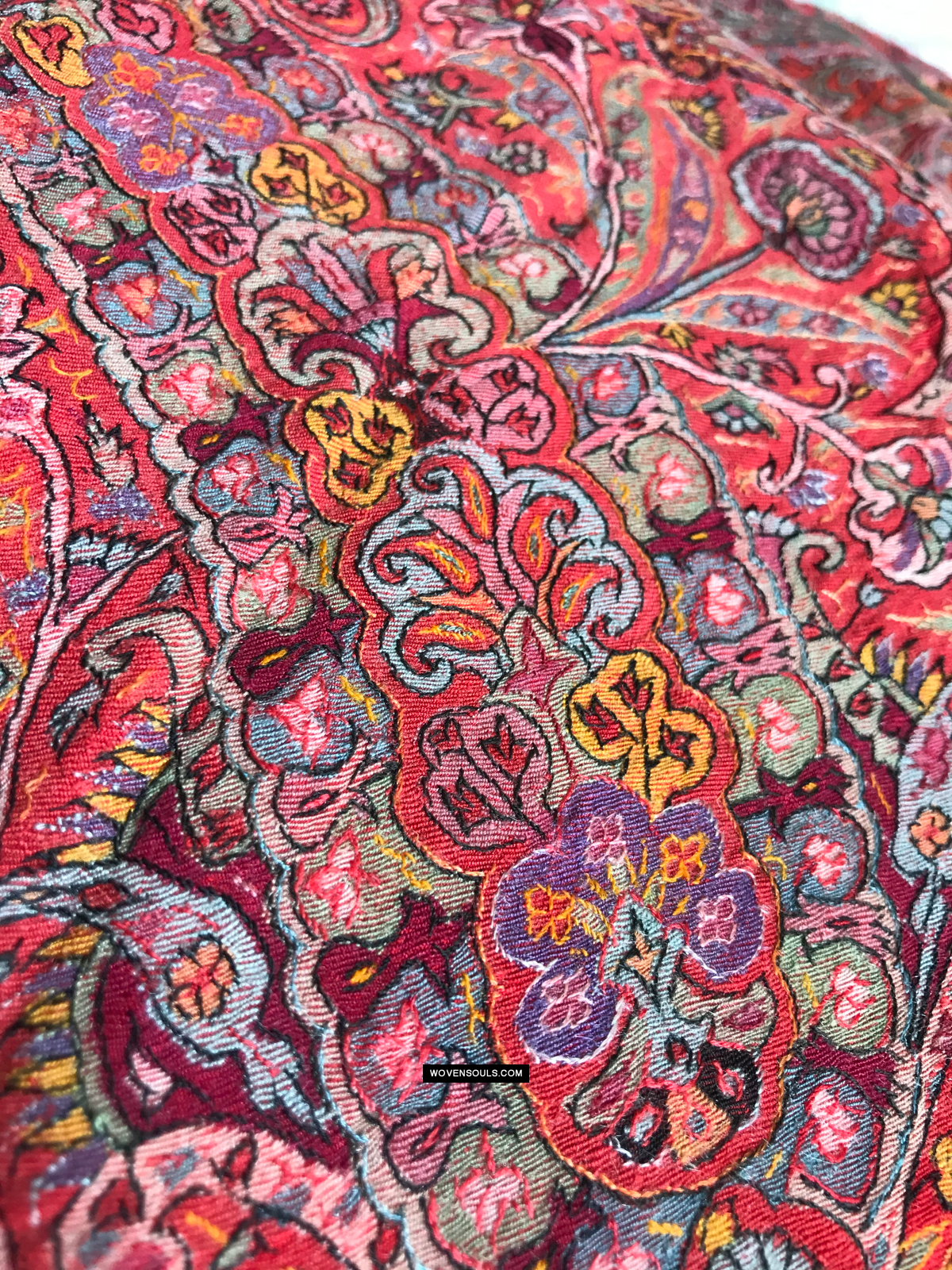
Detail of an Antique Museum-quality Pashmina Dorukha (reversible) Shawl ca. 1870 – courtesy Wovensouls collection, Singapore

The word pashm means "wool" in Persian, but in Kashmir, pashm referred to the raw unspun wool of domesticated Changthangi goats. In common parlance today, pashmina may refer either to the material or to the variant of the Kashmir shawl that is made from it. Both cashmere and pashmina come from the same goat but typical cashmere ranges from 12 to 21 microns in diameter, whereas pashmina can also refer to a cashmere and silk blend (70% / 30%) that has a typical fiber range from 12 to 16 microns.

== History ==
Samples of wool fibres recovered from corroded copper artifacts from Harappa dating back to the Indus Valley Civilisation are believed to be Pashmina and Shahtoosh. The material gained prominence through its use in the Kashmir shawl. In Mughal times, this was used as an indicator of rank and nobility. In 1526, Babur (1483–1530) founded the Mughal Empire in India, and established the practice of giving khalat or "robes of honor", typically made of expensive fabric, to members of their durbar to indicate high service, great achievement, or royal favor. In his time, the Mughal khalat was a set of clothes, which could include a turban, long coat, gown, fitted jacket, sash, shawl, trousers, shirt, and scarf. One or all of these could be made of pashmina and embroidered in gold cloth. In 1568, Kashmir was conquered by Babur's grandson Akbar. In Akbar's time, a pair of pashmina shawls was an expected part of khil'at ceremonies. From the 16th to the early 20th centuries, the Safavid, Zand, and Qajar emperors of Iran also wore pashmina and gifted Kashmir shawls as khilat within their political and religious practices.

Pashmina blankets were also part of a wealthy woman's dowry in India, Pakistan and Nepal. In nineteenth-century English literature Kashmiri shawls were coded as women's luxuries. They acquired the status of heirlooms, worn by a girl on her marriage and coming-of-age. They were inherited rather than purchased. Since English law restricted women's abilities to inherit land, the Kashmir shawl served as an item of high exchange value that a woman could carry. In France, the pashmina Kashmir shawl gained status as a fashion icon through Empress Joséphine de Beauharnais' enthusiastic use. These shawls suited the French well, providing the needed warmth, while adding visual interest to white French gowns through the traditional teardrop buta pattern and discreet floral motifs. The shawl became a symbol of French bourgeois status from the Bourbon Restoration (1815–48) through the Second French Empire (1852–70). As a class marker, it fulfilled 19th century French tastes because it looked rich, had extensive ornamentation, artistic qualities, and was made of expensive raw materials.

== Production ==
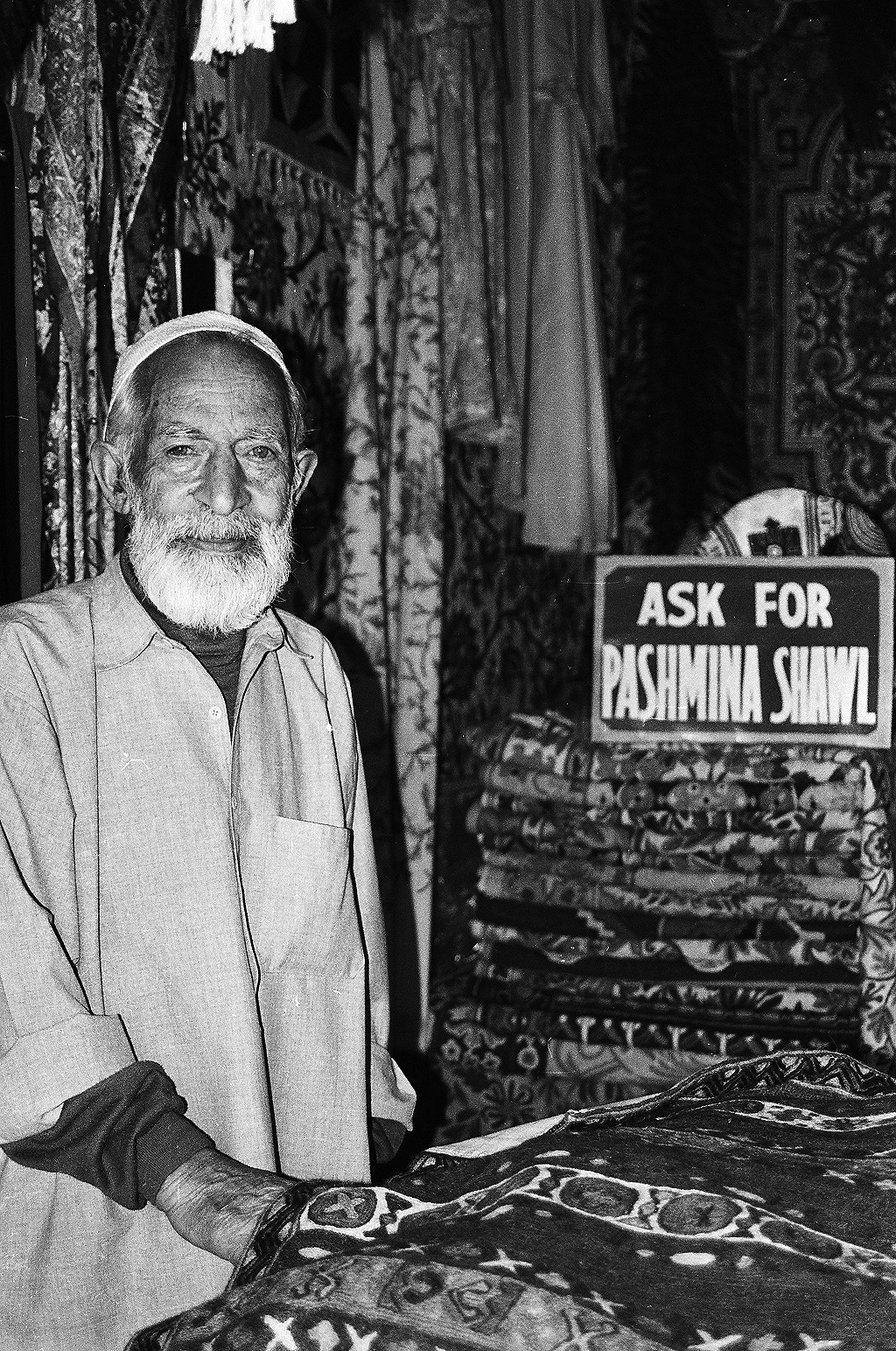
A Kashmiri man sells a pashmina shawl from Kashmir in a market in Delhi, India.

Goats used for pashmina shed their winter coat every spring. One goat sheds approximately 80–170 grams (3–6 oz) of the fibre. In the spring (the moulting season), the goats naturally shed their undercoat, which regrows in winter. This undercoat is collected by combing the goat, not by shearing, as in other fine wools. A traditional producer of pashmina wool in the Ladakh region of the Himalayas are a people known as the Changpa. These are a nomadic people and inhabit the Changthang plateau of Tibet, which has a minimum altitude of 13,500 feet (4,100 m) above sea level and a winter temperature which can drop to −40 °C (−40 °F) The Changpa rear sheep in these harsh climates for meat, and pashmina goats for wool.

Raw pashmina is exported to Kashmir. All steps, from combing (removing impurities and guard hair, and aligning fibers) and spinning, to weaving and finishing, are traditionally carried out by hand by specialized craftsmen and women. The major center of pashmina fabric production is in the old district of the city of Srinagar. The approximate time put into producing a single traditional pashmina stole (70x200cm) is 180 hours.

China accounts for 70% of the world's cashmere production, Mongolia 20%, and the remaining 10% of production is in Afghanistan, Australia, India, Iran, Nepal, Pakistan, the United States, the Central Asian republics and elsewhere. Only a small percentage of this production is the ultra-fine cashmere known as pashmina.

== Products ==
Pashmina accessories are renowned for their softness and warmth. They are produced in a range of sizes, from "scarf" 30 in x 80 in (70 cm x 200 cm)

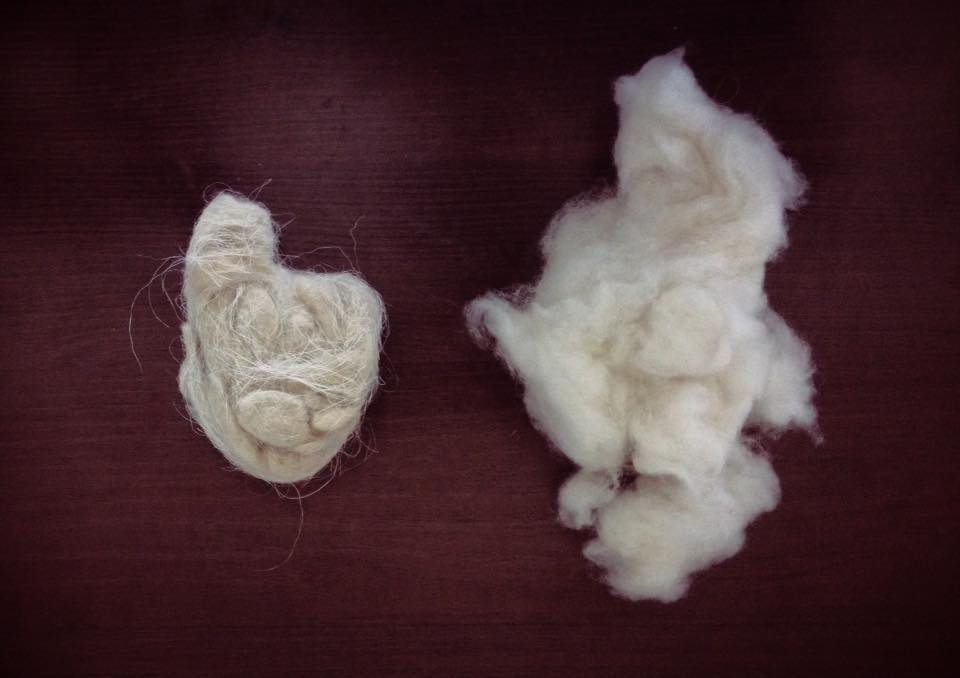
Raw (left) and de-haired (right) Cashmere Pashmina wool

to full- sized shawl measuring 40 in x 80 in (100 cm x 200 cm), large shawls measuring 45 in x 90 in (114 cm x 228 cm), and XL shawls measuring 54 in x 108 in (137 cm x 274 cm).

A craze for pashmina shawls, known as shahmina in Kashmir, in the mid-1990s resulted in high demand for the raw material, so demand exceeded supply. When these shawls rose into fashion prominence during the era, they were marketed dubiously. In the consumer markets, pashmina shawls have been redefined as a shawl/wrap with cashmere and cashmere/silk, notwithstanding the actual meaning of pashmina. Some shawls marketed as pashmina shawls contain (sheep) wool, while other unscrupulous companies marketed artificial fabrics such as viscose and others as "pashmina" with deceptive marketing statements such as "authentic viscose pashmina".

The word "pashmina" is not a labelling term recognized by law in the United States where it is considered another term for cashmere. According to the U.S. Federal Trade Commission:

Some manufacturers use the term pashmina to describe an ultra fine cashmere fiber; others use the term to describe a blend of cashmere and silk. The FTC encourages manufacturers and sellers of products described as pashmina to explain to consumers, on a hangtag, for example, what they mean by the term.

As with all other wool products, the fiber content of a shawl, scarf or other item marketed as pashmina must be accurately disclosed. For example, a blend of cashmere and silk might be labeled 50% Cashmere, 50% Silk or 70% Cashmere, 30% Silk, depending upon the actual cashmere and silk content. If the item contains only cashmere, it should be labeled 100% Pashmina or All Cashmere by the Wool Act or regulations. The earliest shawls had no particular motifs but they had striped in various colours. As time passed, the weavers derived inspiration from nature. Many floral motifs emerged. There is a strong Persian influence in the designs. There are few remnants of the mid 19th century European influence as well. Chand-dar or Moon shawl had a medallion in the center and quarters in the corner. The patterns almost covered the ground colour. Various butis and badam shapes are the popular motifs.
