= Ghania Ayadi =

Algerian footballer (born 2003)

Personal information
- Full name: Ghania Djemaâ Ayadi
- Date of birth: 7 September 2003 (age 23)
- Place of birth: Ghazaouet, Tlemcen, Algeria
- Height: 1.67 m (5 ft 6 in)
- Position: Forward

Team information
- Current team: CF Akbou
- Number: 12

Youth career
- –2021: ES Maghnia

Senior career*
Years	Team	Apps	(Gls)
2021–	CF Akbou		
2023	→ Etihad Club	4	(0)

International career^{‡}
2019	Algeria U17	0	(0)
2019–2023	Algeria U20	13	(1)
2019	Algeria U21	3	(1)
2023–	Algeria	2	(0)
- * Club domestic league appearances and goals ‡ National team caps and goals as of 4 June 2024

Ghania Djemaâ Ayadi (Arabic: غانية جمعة عيادي; born 7 September 2003) is an Algerian professional footballer who plays as a forward for Championnat Elite club CF Akbou and the Algeria national team.

== Club career ==
Ayadi began her football career with ES Maghnia, where she played for three years before moving to CF Akbou during the 2021 season.

On 24 August 2023, She signed with Jordanian Etihad Club for the 2023 Jordanian-Saudi Women's Clubs Championship in Amman. Where she won the championship.

== International career ==
Ayadi is a former youth international having played at under-17 and under-20 level. She was part of Algeria's squad for the 2019 African Games. She was also called up for the 2019 UNAF U-20 Women's Tournament in Tanger. and the 2023 UNAF U-20 Women's Tournament in Le Kram. At just 16 years old, she made the squad for the 2019 UNAF U-21 Women's Tournament with the under-21 team. She scored the opening goal against Tanzania in a 3–0 victory, securing the title for Algeria.

In February 2023, She got her first call-up to the senior team to participate in a training camp in Sidi Moussa. She played two practice matches against local ASE Alger Centre, scoring in both games against the team. On 27 February 2024, she made her debut for the national team in a 3–0 win against Burkina Faso, Coming on in the 82nd minute as a substitute for Inés Boutaleb.

== Honours ==
Algeria

- UNAF U-20 Women's Tournament:

(silver) Runners-up (1): 2023
(bronze) Third place (1): 2019

- UNAF U-21 Women's Tournament:

Champion (1): 2019

Akbou

- Championnat National Elite:

Champion (1): 2023–24

- Algerian Women's Cup:

Champion (1): 2023–24

Etihad

- Jordanian-Saudi Women's Clubs Championship:

Champion (1): 2023
