= Wassila Alouache =

Algerian footballer (born 2000)

Personal information
- Date of birth: 11 July 2000 (age 26)
- Place of birth: Bouira, Algeria
- Height: 1.67 m (5 ft 6 in)
- Position: Defender

Team information
- Current team: 1207 Antalya
- Number: 4

Youth career
- 2017–2018: NE Bouira
- 2018–2019: JF Khroub

Senior career*
Years	Team	Apps	(Gls)
2019–2020	JF Khroub	15	(20)
2020–2022	CF Akbou	40	(18)
2022–2023	CS Constantine		
2023–	CF Akbou		
2025–	1207 Antalya	3	(2)

International career^{‡}
2019–2020	Algeria U20	10	(0)
2020	Algeria U21	10	(0)
2021–	Algeria	9	(0)
- * Club domestic league appearances and goals as of 26 May 20244 October 2025 ‡ National team caps and goals as of 8 April 2024

Wassila Alouache (Arabic: وسيلة علواش; born 11 July 2000) is an Algerian professional footballer who plays as a defender for Turkish Super League club 1207 Antalya and the Algeria national team.

== Club career ==
In 2017, Allouche started playing football with NE Bouira Club's youth team, where she played for two seasons. In 2019, she joined JF Khroub, where she played for the youth team until being integrated into the senior squad in 2020.

In 2020, she signed in favor of the CF Akbou and played for the club for two seasons. Then she moved to CS Constantine for one season before returning to Akbou in 2023.

In September 2025, she moved to Turkey, and signed with 1207 Antalya to play in the Super League.

== International career ==
Alouache a former Algerian youth international, was first selected for the under-20 team in December 2018 to participate in a preparatory stage in Sidi Moussa. She later made the final squad for the 2019 African Games in Morocco. where she and the team finished fourth. Later in that year, she was also included in the squad for the 2019 UNAF U-20 Women's Tournament. and was also called for the 2020 African U-20 Women's World Cup qualification first round double confrontation against South Sudan.

In December 2019, she was selected for the under-21 team to participate in the 2019 UNAF U-21 Women's Tournament in Algeria. The tournament was ultimately won by the Algerian team.

In July 2021, she got her first call-up to the senior team to participate in a preparatory stage for the 2021 Arab Women's Cup. She ultimately made it into the final squad, and made her debut for the team on 26 August 2021 in a 3–1 win against Jordan On 29 October 2024, She scored her first international goal in a 4–1 defeat to Nigeria, becoming the first Algerian to score against them.

== International goals ==
Scores and results list Algeria's goal tally first, score column indicates score after each Alouache goal.

List of international goals scored by Wassila Alouache
No.	Date	Venue	Opponent	Score	Result	Competition
1	29 October 2024	Onikan Stadium, Lagos, Nigeria	Nigeria	1–2	1–4	Friendly

== Honours ==
Algeria

- UNAF U-21 Women's Tournament Champions: 2019

JF Khroub

- Algerian Women's Championship Champions: 2019–20

CF Akbou

- Algerian Women's Championship Champions: 2023–24
- Algerian Women's Cup Champions: 2023–24
