= 2019 UNAF U-21 Women's Tournament =

Tournament details
- Country: Algeria
- Dates: 20–27 December
- Teams: 5

Final positions
- Champions: Algeria (1st title)
- Runners-up: Morocco
- Third place: Tanzania

Tournament statistics
- Matches played: 5
- Goals scored: 9 (1.8 per match)
- Top goal scorer(s): (Algeria) Nassima Bakhti (2 goals)

The 2019 UNAF U-21 Women's Tournament is the 1st edition of the UNAF U-21 Women's Tournament. The tournament was held in Algeria, from 20 to 27 December 2019. Algeria won the tournament, Morocco finished second and Tanzania third.

== Participants ==
- Algeria (hosts)
- Egypt
- Morocco
- Burkina Faso (invited)
- Tanzania (invited)
- Libya (withdrew)
- Tunisia (withdrew)

== Venues ==
Cities	Venues	Capacity
Dar El Beïda, Algiers	Dar El Beïda Stadium	11,000

== Tournament ==
=== Standings ===
Team	Pld	W	D	L	GF	GA	GD	Pts
Algeria	3	2	1	0	6	0	+6	7
Morocco	2	1	1	0	1	0	+1	4
Tanzania	2	0	1	1	1	4	−3	1
Egypt	2	0	1	1	1	4	−3	1
Burkina Faso	1	0	0	1	0	1	−1	0

=== Matches ===
22 December 2019
11:00 UTC+1

Morocco	1–0	Burkina Faso (Note: Burkina Faso withdrew the tournament after the first match against Morocco in the first day.)
Rakkas 71'	Report

Dar El Beïda Stadium, Dar El Beïda
22 December 2019
14:00 UTC+1

Algeria	3–0	Egypt
Ghanouche 5'; Ournani 21'; Bakhti 55' (pen.)	Report

Dar El Beïda Stadium, Dar El Beïda

24 December 2019
11:00 UTC+1

Egypt	Cancelled (Note: The two matches of the second day of the tournament were cancelled due to the political reason in Algeria when the chief of staff of the People's National Army Ahmed Gaid Salah died.)	Burkina Faso

Dar El Beïda Stadium, Dar El Beïda
24 December 2019
14:00 UTC+1

Morocco	Cancelled	Tanzania

Dar El Beïda Stadium, Dar El Beïda

26 December 2019
11:00 UTC+1

Egypt	1–1	Tanzania
Ghazi 66'	Report	Sanga Tokomboki 5'

Dar El Beïda Stadium, Dar El Beïda
26 December 2019
14:00 UTC+1

Algeria	0–0	Morocco
	Report

Dar El Beïda Stadium, Dar El Beïda

28 December 2019
14:00 UTC+1

Algeria	3–0	Tanzania
Ayadi 40'; Bakhti 50' (pen.); Bahri 72'	Report

Dar El Beïda Stadium, Dar El Beïda
