= Amel Salah =

Algerian association football player (born 2002)

Personal information
- Date of birth: 23 April 2002 (age 24)
- Place of birth: Nîmes, France
- Position: Goalkeeper

Team information
- Current team: Le Puy Foot
- Number: 30

Youth career
- 2017: Montpellier
- 2017–2018: Nîmes

Senior career*
Years	Team	Apps	(Gls)
2019–2023	FC Tarascon	2	(0)
2023–	Le Puy Foot	6	(0)

International career^{‡}
2019–2020	Algeria U20	6	(0)
2023–	Algeria	3	(0)
- * Club domestic league appearances and goals as of 26 May 2024 ‡ National team caps and goals as of 7 April 2024

Amel Salah (Arabic: أمل صالح; born 23 April 2002) is an Algerian professional footballer who plays as a goalkeeper for Division 3 Féminine club Le Puy Football 43 Auvergne and the Algeria national team.

== Club career ==
Trained in Nîmes, Salah went through the Montpellier training academy in the under-15 category before playing at the national level in the U19 category. She then joined Tarascon in 2019, where she established herself at the senior level.

In August 2023, she signed with Division 3 Féminine club Le Puy Football 43 Auvergne. She played a decisive role in the Coupe de France and was named the heroine of the day for making two crucial saves that helped Le Puy qualify and eliminate Division 1 side Reims.

== International career ==
Salah is a former Algeria youth international and has played for the under-20 team. She made the final squad that represented Algeria in the 2019 African Games. later that year, she was also selected for the 2019 UNAF U-20 Women's Tournament in Morocco.

She received her first call-up to the senior team in September 2023 for the 2024 Africa Cup of Nations qualifying matches against Uganda. She made her debut for the team on 24 February 2024 in a 2–0 win against Burkina Faso.

== Career statistics ==
=== Club ===
As of match played 10 November 2024

Appearances and goals by club, season and competition
Club	Season	League			Cup		Total	
Club	Season	Division	Apps	Goals	Apps	Goals	Apps	Goals
FC Tarascon	2019–20	D3F	0	0	2	0	2	0
FC Tarascon	Total		0	0	2	0	2	0
Le Puy Foot	2023–24	D3F	5	0	5	0	10	0
Le Puy Foot	2024–25	D3F	6	0			6	0
Le Puy Foot	Total		11	0	5	0	16	0
Career total			11	0	7	0	18	0
