= Zineb Redouani =

Moroccan footballer (born 2000)

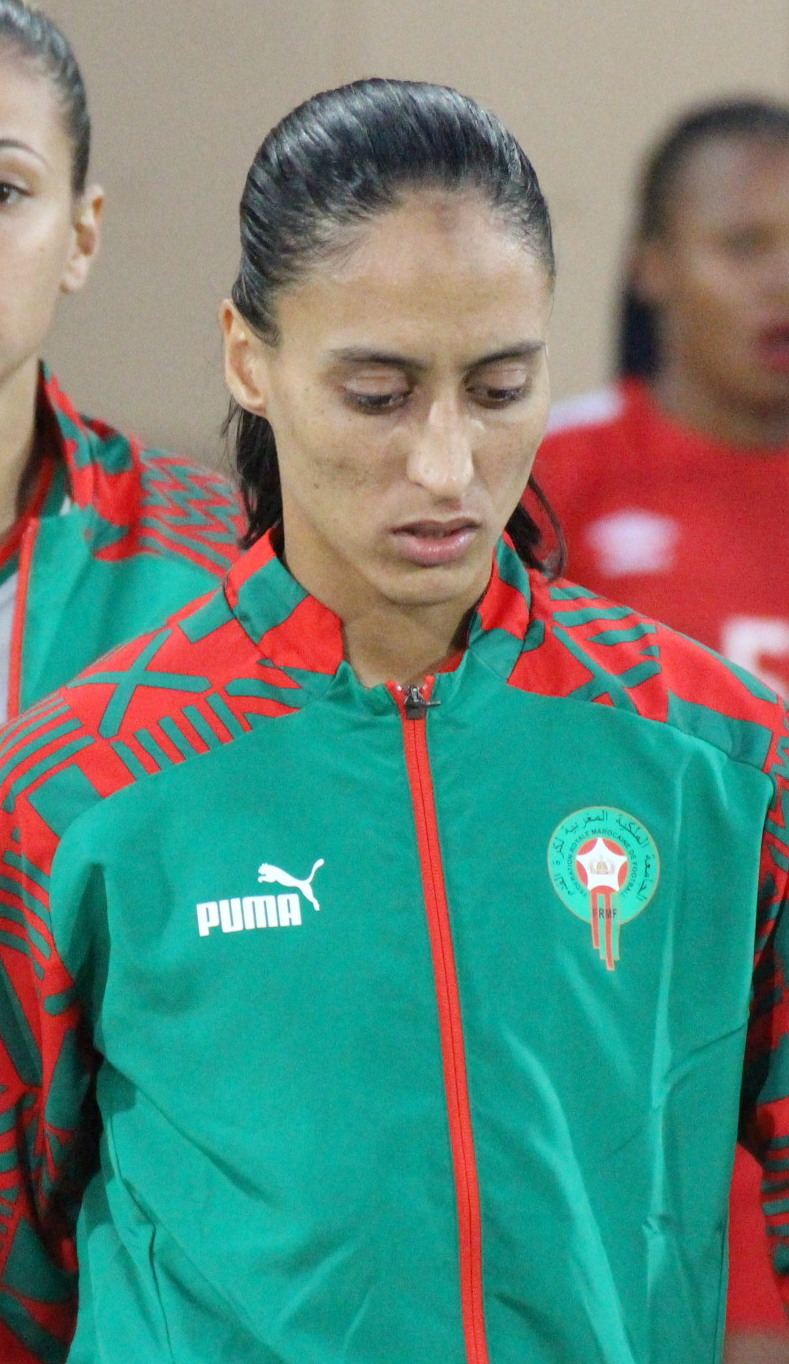
- Redouani with Morocco in 2023

Personal information
- Date of birth: 12 June 2000 (age 26)
- Place of birth: Meknes, Morocco
- Height: 1.64 m (5 ft 5 in)
- Position: Defender

Team information
- Current team: AS FAR
- Number: 2

Youth career
- –2017: CSM Toulal

Senior career*
Years	Team	Apps	(Gls)
2017–2020	Raja Aïn Harrouda		
2020–	AS FAR		

International career^{‡}
2017–2020	Morocco U20	17	(6)
2018–	Morocco		
Medal record
Representing Morocco
African Games
Bronze medal – third place	2019 Morocco
UNAF U-20 Women's Tournament
Winner	2019 Morocco
UNAF Women's Tournament
Winner	2020 Tunisia
Women's Africa Cup of Nations
Silver medal – second place	2022 Morocco
- * Club domestic league appearances and goals ‡ National team caps and goals as of 23:50, 5 December 2023 (UTC)

Zineb Redouani (Arabic: زينب رضواني; born 12 June 2000) is a Moroccan professional footballer who plays as a defender for AS FAR and the Morocco women's national team.

== Club career ==
=== AS FAR ===
Redouani first played with Raja Aïn Harrouda, before joining AS FAR in 2020. She has won two Championships and two Throne Cups. She was part of the team which competed in the 2021 CAF Champions League.

Redouani participated in AS FAR's championship-winning campaign in the 2022 CAF Champions League. During the second game against Green Buffaloes F.C., she received a straight red card after an VAR review of her foul on Natasha Nanyangwe.

== International career ==
=== Youth ===
==== 2019: African Games ====
Redouani played with the Morocco U-20s at the 2019 African Games in Rabat where Morocco won the bronze medal. She recorded a goal off a penalty kick in the third place match against Algeria. In the same year, she won the 2019 UNAF U-20 tournament in Tangier with the team.

=== Senior ===
Redouani was called up for the first team in 2018. She has capped for Morocco at senior level during the Aisha Buhari Cup. She played in the UNAF Tournament organized in Tunis in February 2020, which Morocco won.

==== 2022 Africa Cup of Nations ====
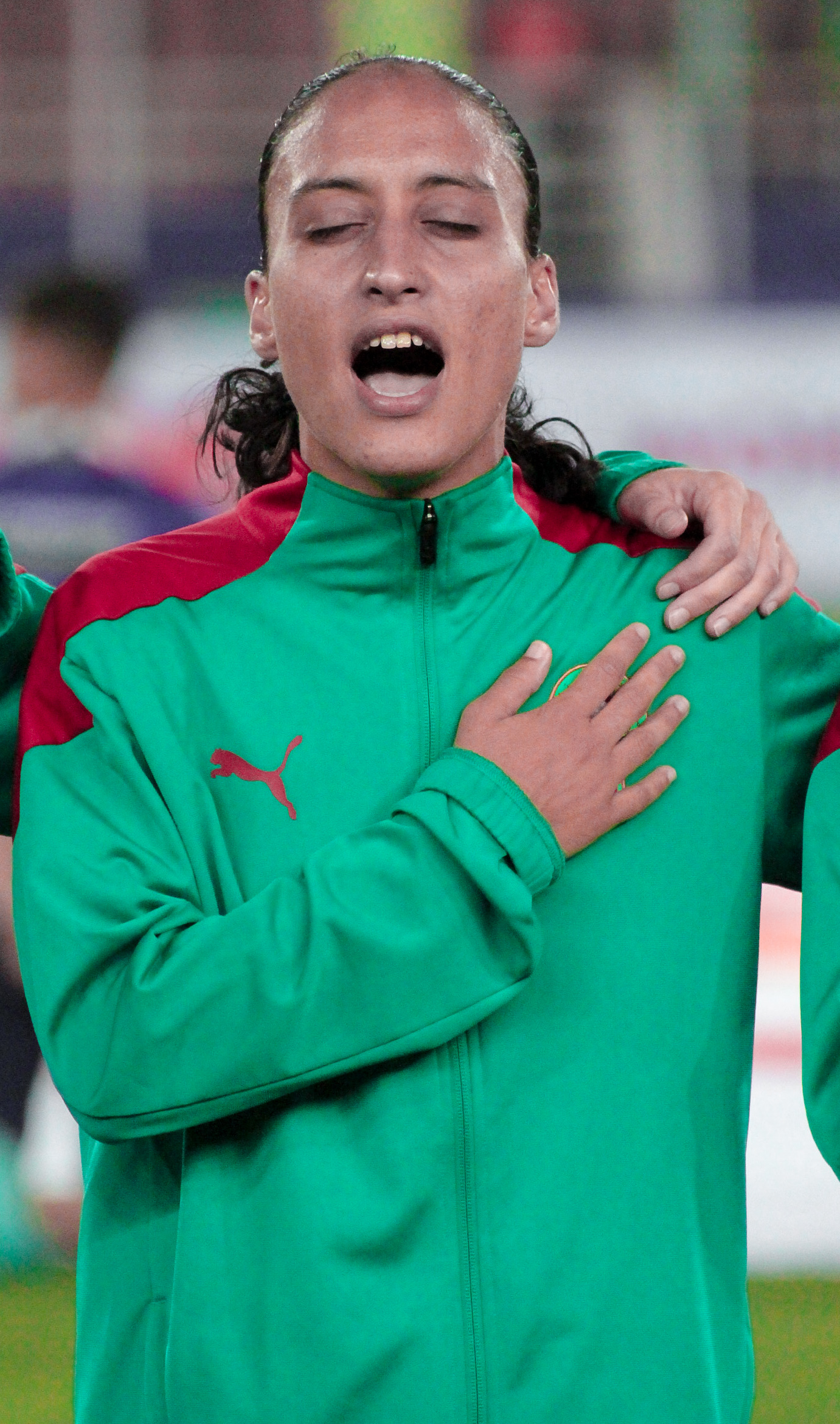
Redouani with Morocco at the 2022 Women's Africa Cup of Nations

She was part of the 26-woman squad who participated in the 2022 African Cup of Nations. Redouani started the final, which Morocco lost 2–1 to South Africa. She was injured and replaced by her teammate at AS FAR, Ghazlan Shahiri. As a result of being runners-up, Morocco won their first qualification for the FIFA World Cup.

==== 2023 FIFA World Cup ====
Redouani started all three games of the group stage at the 2023 FIFA World Cup. She scored an own goal in Morocco's opening match in which they lost 6–0 to Germany.

== Honours ==
AS FAR

- Moroccan Championship (4): 2021, 2022, 2023, 2024
- Moroccan Throne Cup (4): 2020, 2021, 2022, 2023
- UNAF Champions League (2): 2021, 2024
- CAF Champions League (1): 2022; runner up: 2024

Morocco U20

- UNAF U-20 Tournament: 2019

Morocco

- Africa Cup of Nations runner-up: 2022
- UNAF Tournament: 2020

Individual

- Africa Cup of Nations Team of the Tournament: 2022
- IFFHS CAF Team of The Year: 2022

== See also ==
- List of Morocco women's international footballers
