= 2025 UNAF U-20 Women's Tournament =

Tournament details
- Host country: Tunisia
- Dates: 26 November – 2 December
- Teams: 6
- Venues: 4 (in 4 host cities)

Final positions
- Champions: Morocco (3rd title)
- Runners-up: Egypt
- Third place: Tunisia
- Fourth place: Algeria

The 2025 UNAF U-20 Women's Tournament was the 3rd edition of the UNAF U-20 Women's Tournament, the international women's youth football championship contested by the under-20 national teams of the member associations of UNAF (North Africa). The tournament took place in Tunisia, from 26 November to 2 December 2025.

Morocco, the two-time champion, succeeded in achieving this for the third time in a row.

== Participating nations ==
The draw took place on 5 November 2025.

Team	App	Last	Best placement in the tournament
Algeria	3rd	2023	Runner-up (2023)
Egypt	2nd	2023	Third Place (2023)
Jordan (Invitee)	1st	—N/a	debut
Libya	1st	—N/a	debut
Morocco (Holders)	3rd	2023	Champions (2019, 2023)
Tunisia (Hosts)	3rd	2023	Fourth Place (2019, 2023)

== Venues ==
Cities	Venues	Capacity
Hammam-Lif	Bou Kornine Stadium	15,000
Le Bardo	Hédi Enneifer Stadium	11,000
La Marsa	Abdelaziz Chtioui Stadium	6,500
Sousse	Sousse Olympic Stadium	6,500

== Group stage ==
All times are local, CET (UTC+1).

=== Group A ===
Pos	Team	Pld	W	D	L	GF	GA	GD	Pts	Qualification
1	Egypt	2	2	0	0	13	0	+13	6	First place match
2	Tunisia (H)	2	1	0	1	12	1	+11	3	Third place match
3	Libya	2	0	0	2	0	24	−24	0	Fifth place match

Source: UNAF
Rules for classification: 1) Points; 2) Goal difference; 3) Goals scored
(H) Hosts
26 November 2025
14:30

Tunisia	0–1	Egypt
	Report	Abdelrasol 16'

Bou Kornine Stadium, Hammam-Lif
Referee: Hajar Haddouchi (Morocco)

28 November 2025
14:30

Egypt	12–0	Libya
Abouseif 3', 9', 31'; Mohamed 12', 37'; George 13', 29'; El Mahdy 15'; Essam 26'; Fekry 40+2'; Adel 56'; Khalid 65'	Report

Hédi Enneifer Stadium, Le Bardo
Referee: Slimi Tassadit (Algeria)

30 November 2025
14:30

Libya	0–12	Tunisia
	Report	Ajroud 6', 8', 27'; Marzouki 12'; Barhoumy 20'; Ben Kaabia 30'; Ghrabaa 43' (pen.); Bhouri 45'; Ben Haj Jrad 50'; Khalfallah 59'; Zerelli 76'; Abdeoui 78'

Abdelaziz Chtioui Stadium, La Marsa
Referee: Aya Antar (Egypt)

=== Group B ===
Pos	Team	Pld	W	D	L	GF	GA	GD	Pts	Qualification
1	Morocco	2	2	0	0	7	1	+6	6	First place match
2	Algeria	2	1	0	1	3	4	−1	3	Third place match
3	Jordan	2	0	0	2	0	5	−5	0	Fifth place match

Source: UNAF
Rules for classification: 1) Points; 2) Goal difference; 3) Goals scored
26 November 2025
14:30

Morocco	4–1	Algeria
Gharrou 16'; Medyouni 18', 47'; El Koumir 26'	Report	Medyouni 30' (o.g.)

Sousse Olympic Stadium, Sousse
Referee: Sana Selmi (Tunisia)

28 November 2025
14:30

Algeria	2–0	Jordan
Bourzig 29'; Habib 40+2'	Report

Sousse Olympic Stadium, Sousse
Referee: Aya Antar (Egypt)

30 November 2025
14:30

Jordan	0–3	Morocco
	Report	El Koumir 8', 22', 34'

Sousse Olympic Stadium, Sousse
Referee: Lobna Ben Njima (Tunisia)

== Ranking matches ==
=== Fifth place match ===
2 December 2025
11:00

Libya	0–17	Jordan
	Report	Issa 15' (pen.); Omrani 23' (o.g.); Al-Khashook 25'; Abu Ali 30', 37', 38', 50'; Al-Titi 31', 36', 54'; Abu Hazeem 41', 72'; Al-Batayneh 46'; Jarrar 62'; Shalabi 68'; Hammad 76'; Mara 82'

Bou Kornine Stadium, Hammam-Lif
Referee: Sana Selmi (Tunisia)

=== Third place match ===
2 December 2025
11:00

Tunisia	2–1	Algeria
Barhoumy 24' (pen.); Khanchouch 63'	Report	Tizzaoui 8'

Abdelaziz Chtioui Stadium, La Marsa
Referee: Hajar Haddouchi (Morocco)

=== First place match ===
2 December 2025
11:00

Egypt	0–2	Morocco
	Report	El Koumir 1'; Medyouni 6'

Hédi Enneifer Stadium, Le Bardo
Referee: Slimi Tassadit (Algeria)
