= Nora Nouhaili =

Tunisian footballer (born 2003)

Nora Nouhaili نورة نحايلي
Personal information
- Full name: Noura Bedoui Nouhaili
- Date of birth: 15 February 2003 (age 23)
- Place of birth: Eugene, Oregon, U.S.
- Height: 1.57 m (5 ft 2 in)
- Positions: Right winger; defensive midfielder

Team information
- Current team: Wydad AC
- Number: 7

College career
Years	Team	Apps	(Gls)
2020–2023	Upper Iowa Peacocks	15	(12)

Senior career*
Years	Team	Apps	(Gls)
2024–2025	RS Berkane	12	(3)
2025–	Wydad AC	0	(0)

International career
2023	Morocco U20	3	(1)
2023–2024	Morocco U23	1	(0)
2025–	Tunisia	1	(0)
Medal record
Women's soccer
Representing Morocco
UNAF U-20 Women's Tournament
Winner	2023 Tunisia
- * Club domestic league appearances and goals

Nora Bedoui Nouhaili (Tunisian Arabic: نورة بدوي نحايلي; born 15 February 2003) is a professional footballer who plays as a right winger for Moroccan Division 1 Féminine club Wydad. Born in the United States and a former Morocco youth international, she plays for the Tunisia national team.

== Early life ==
Nouhaili began playing competitive soccer at age 11 in Las Vegas with Albion SC DA and Players SC, and represented Nevada in the Olympic Development Program. She attended Centennial High School, where she played on both varsity and junior varsity teams.

== Club career ==
Nouhaili played collegiate soccer at Upper Iowa University from 2020 to 2023.

After graduating, she began her professional career with RS Berkane, where she helped the team earn promotion to Morocco's top division and finish runner-up in the 2024–25 season. In July 2025, she joined fellow D1 side Wydad AC.

== International career ==
Born in the USA, to Moroccan and Tunisian parents, Nouhaili was eligible to represent either Morocco or Tunisia.

In March 2023, she was called up to the Morocco under-20 team for the UNAF U-20 Women's Tournament in Tunisia, where she appeared in all matches and scored the decisive goal against Egypt in stoppage time to secure the title. A month later, she made one appearance for the Morocco under-23 team in a match against Cameroon.

She was later called up to Morocco's B team for a series of friendlies before switching allegiance to Tunisia, where she was subsequently named in the final squad for the 2024 Women's Africa Cup of Nations. On 13 July 2025, She made her debut for the Eagles of Carthage in a 1–2 loss to Botswana as a starter.
