= Equatorial Guinea at the 2019 African Games =

- Flag of Equatorial Guinea
- IOC code: GEQ
- NOC: Equatoguinean Olympic Committee

in Rabat, Morocco 19 August 2019 – 31 August 2019
- Competitors: 44 (16 men and 28 women) in 8 sports
- Medals: Gold 0 Silver 0 Bronze 0 Total 0

African Games appearances
- 2011; 2015; 2019; 2023

Equatorial Guinea competed at the 2019 African Games held from 19 to 31 August 2019 in Rabat, Morocco.

== 3x3 basketball ==
Equatorial Guinea competed in 3x3 basketball in both the men's tournament and women's tournament. In both tournaments the teams lost the majority of their matches.

== Athletics ==
Athletes representing Equatorial Guinea competed in the men's 100 metres, men's 200 metres, women's 200 metres, men's 800 metres, men's 1500 metres and men's long jump events.

== Boxing ==
Four athletes competed in boxing: Armando Moliko, Mary Eyang, Raúl Obama and Toribio Koca.

== Football ==
Equatorial Guinea women's national under-20 football team competed in the women's tournament at the 2019 African Games. The team did not advance to the semi-finals.

== Karate ==
Expedito Elá and Lisardo Perico Sabana competed in karate.

== Swimming ==
Two swimmers were scheduled to compete but neither competed in their scheduled events: Diosdado Joaquín Miko Eyenga and Pilar Asangono.

== Taekwondo ==
Jesús Boko and Verónica Mbang competed in Taekwondo. Both were eliminated in the first round.

== Tennis ==
Francisco Boesi competed in the men's singles event. He lost his only match against Charles Alipoe-Tchotchodji (representing Togo).

María Jesús Ayingono competed in the women's singles event. She lost her only match against Allyson Onya (representing Democratic Republic of the Congo).
