= UNAF =

Association football organising body

Union of North African Football اتحاد شمال إفريقيا لكرة القدم Union nord-africaine de football
- Formation: 26 February 2005
- Type: CAF regional subconfederation
- Headquarters: Tunis, Tunisia
- Region served: North Africa
- Members: 5 members: Algeria; Egypt; Libya; Morocco; Tunisia
- Official language: Arabic, English, French and Spanish
- President: (Egypt) Hany Abo Rida
- Affiliations: CAF, FIFA
- Website: www.unafonline.org

The Union of North African Football (Arabic: اتحاد شمال إفريقيا لكرة القدم, romanized: Ittiḥād Shamāl Ifrīqyā li-Kurat al-Qadam; French: Union nord-africaine de football), also known by its acronym UNAF, is a regional subconfederation affiliated with CAF and the governing body for football in North Africa. Established in 2005 by the North African members: Algeria, Egypt, Libya, Morocco, and Tunisia. The post of president will be rotated among the five founding nations.

== History ==
The Union of North African Football (UNAF) was founded in 2005 and includes the countries of Algeria, Egypt, Libya, Morocco and Tunisia and is continued to the Confederation of African Football that have 53 national football associations distributed into 6 regions. The UNAF is the sixth region of the continent by division accredited to the CAF and the Union has presided over in the first parliamentary period immediately following its founding by Mr. Samir Zaher a former president of the Egyptian Football Association, the president is elected during a plenary session for a period of 4 years by the members of the Union and are the heads of the five unions and the president-elect proposes as his deputy from among the immediate superiors five national unions during the first meeting of an executive office following the election as General Assembly by the Executive Office to determine the heads and members of the committees.

The recent president elected is Mr. Wadie Jary, a president of the Tunisian Football Federation. He was unanimously elected chairman of the UNAF for a term of four years and during the electoral general assembly, which was held on Saturday 25 October 2014 in Tunis. He was also selected Mr. Gamal Allam, a head of the Egyptian Football Association as a vice-president of the UNAF unanimously. On the other hand, the General Assembly approved in particular on the administrative and financial reports of the UNAF as well as the adoption of the estimated budget of the Union project for the year 2015 and the report of the Finance Committee meeting held on 23 October 2014. The program was approved on the North African Union's activities for the year 2015.

== Board of directors ==
=== Current board of directors ===
| President | Years |
|---|---|
| President | (Libya) Abdelhakim Al-Shalmani |
| General Secretary | (Tunisia) Mahmoud Hammami |
| Assistant General Secretary | (Tunisia) Ridha Kraiem |
| Chairman of the Technical Committee | (Algeria) Chafik Ameur |
| Chairman of the Finance Committee | (Morocco) Hassan Filali |
| Chairman of the Referees Committee | (Egypt) Essam Abdel Fattah |
| Chairman of the Medical Committee | (Tunisia) Chafik Jarraya |

=== Former presidents ===
| President | Years |
|---|---|
| (Egypt) Samir Zaher | 2005–2008 |
| (Algeria) Mohamed Raouraoua | 2008–2011 |
| (Morocco) Ali Fassi-Fihri | 2011–2014 |
| (Tunisia) Wadie Jary | 2014–2018 |
| (Libya) Jamal Al-Jaafari | 2018–2019 |
| (Libya) Abdelhakim Al-Shalmani | 2019–2024 |
| (Egypt) Gamal Allam | 2024–2025 |
| (Egypt) Hany Abo Rida | 2025–Present |

== Member associations ==
UNAF has 5 member associations. All associations were founding members of UNAF. All of them are members of the Confederation of African Football and the Union of Arab Football Associations (UAFA).

| Code | Association | National teams | Founded | FIFA affiliation | CAF affiliation | UAFA affiliation | UNAF affiliation | IOC member |
|---|---|---|---|---|---|---|---|---|
| ALG | Algeria | Men's; U23; U20; U17; F; BS; Women's; W U20; W U17; F | 1962 | 1964 | 1964 | 1974 | 2005 | Yes |
| EGY | Egypt | Men's; U23; U20; U17; F; BS; Women's; W U20; W U17; F | 1921 | 1923 | 1957 | 1974 | 2005 | Yes |
| LBY | Libya | Men's; U23; U20; U17; F; BS; Women's; W U20; W U17; F | 1962 | 1964 | 1965 | 1974 | 2005 | Yes |
| MAR | Morocco | Men's; U23; U20; U17; F; BS; Women's; W U20; W U17; F | 1955 | 1960 | 1959 | 1976 | 2005 | Yes |
| TUN | Tunisia | Men's; U23; U20; U17; F; BS; Women's; W U20; W U17; F | 1957 | 1960 | 1960 | 1976 | 2005 | Yes |

== Competitions ==
UNAF runs several competitions which cover men's, women's, youth, clubs and futsal.

=== Current title holders ===
| Competition | Year | Champions | Title | Runners-up | Next edition | Most titles |
Men's national teams
| U-20 tournament | 2026 | Egypt | 4th | Morocco | TBA | Tunisia (9) |
| U-18 tournament | 2019 | Morocco | 1st | Egypt | TBA | Morocco (1) Tunisia (1) |
| U-17 tournament | 2026 (Nov) | Algeria | 5th | Egypt | TBA | Morocco (5) Algeria (5) |
| U-16 tournament | 2026 | Tunisia | 2nd | Algeria | TBA | Tunisia (2) |
| U-15 tournament | 2019 | Morocco | 2nd | Algeria | TBA | Morocco (2) |
| Schools tournament | 2026 | Morocco | 1st | Algeria | 2027 | Algeria (2) |
Women's national teams
| Women's tournament | 2020 | Morocco | 1st | Tanzania | 2023 (Cancelled) | Morocco (1) Tunisia (1) |
| U-21 women's tournament | 2019 | Algeria | 1st | Morocco | TBA | Algeria (1) |
| U-20 women's tournament | 2025 | Morocco | 3rd | Egypt | TBA | Morocco (3) |
| U-17 women's tournament | 2026 | Morocco | 1st | Tunisia | TBA | Tanzania (1) Morocco (1) |
| Schools women's tournament | 2026 | Morocco | 4th | Algeria | 2027 | Morocco (4) |
Women's club teams
| CAF Women's Champions League UNAF Qualifiers | 2026 | (Morocco) FUS Rabat | 1st | (Egypt) FC Masar | 2027 | (Morocco) AS FAR (3) |
| Women's U-20 club tournament | 2024 | (Algeria) Afak Relizane | 1st | (Tunisia) ASF Sousse | TBA | (Algeria) Afak Relizane (1) |

=== Defunct competitions ===
| Competition | Year | Champions | Title | Runners-up | – | Most titles |
Men's national teams
| U-23 tournament | 2011 | Saudi Arabia | 1st | Algeria | – | Algeria (2) |
| Futsal tournament | 2010 | Libya | 3rd | Morocco | – | Libya (3) |
Club teams (Men's)
| Club cup | 2015 | (Morocco) Raja Casablanca | 1st | (Egypt) Ismaily SC | – | (Morocco) Raja Casablanca (1) |
| UNAF Cup of Champions | 2010 | (Tunisia) Club Africain | 2nd | (Algeria) MC Alger | – | (Tunisia) Club Africain (2) |
| UNAF Cup Winners Cup | 2010 | (Algeria) ES Sétif | 1st | (Libya) Al-Nasr Benghazi | – | – |
| UNAF Super Cup | 2010 | (Algeria) ES Sétif | 1st | (Tunisia) CS Sfaxien | – | (Algeria) ES Sétif (1) |
Club teams (Women's)
| Women's club tournament | 2009 | (Tunisia) ASF Sahel | 1st | (Egypt) Wadi Degla | – | (Algeria) ASE Alger Centre (1) (Morocco) FC Berrechid (1) (Tunisia) ASF Sahel (1) |

== Major tournament records ==
Legend

- 1st – Champions
- 2nd – Runners-up
- 3rd – Third place
- 4th – Fourth place
- QF – Quarter-finals (1934–1938, 1954–1970, and 1986–present: knockout round of 8)
- GS – Group stage
- R3 — Round 3 (2026–present: knockout round of 16)
- R2 – Round 2 (1974–1978, second group stage, top 8; 1982: second group stage, top 12; 1986–2022: knockout round of 16; 2026–present: knockout round of 32)
- R1 – Round 1
- Q – Qualified for upcoming tournament
- •• – Qualified but withdrew
- • – Did not qualify
- × – Did not enter / Withdrew / Banned
- – Hosts
- – Not affiliated in FIFA

For each tournament, the number of teams in each finals tournament (in brackets) are shown.

=== FIFA World Cup ===
FIFA World Cup record
| Team | 1930 (Uruguay) (13) | 1934 (Italy) (16) | 1938 (France) (15) | 1950 (Brazil) (13) | 1954 (Switzerland) (16) | 1958 (Sweden) (16) | 1962 (Chile) (16) | 1966 (England) (16) | 1970 (Mexico) (16) | 1974 (West Germany) (16) | 1978 (Argentina) (16) | 1982 (Spain) (24) | 1986 (Mexico) (24) | 1990 (Italy) (24) | 1994 (United States) (24) | 1998 (France) (32) | 2002 (Japan) (South Korea) (32) | 2006 (Germany) (32) | 2010 (South Africa) (32) | 2014 (Brazil) (32) | 2018 (Russia) (32) | 2022 (Qatar) (32) | 2026 (Canada) (Mexico) (United States) (48) | 2030 (Morocco) (Portugal) (Spain) (48) | 2034 (Saudi Arabia) (48) | Years |
|---|---|---|---|---|---|---|---|---|---|---|---|---|---|---|---|---|---|---|---|---|---|---|---|---|---|---|
| Algeria | | | | | | | | × | • | • | • | R1; 13th | R1; 22nd | • | • | • | • | • | R1; 28th | R2; 14th | • | • | R2; 30th | | | 5/15 |
| Egypt | × | R1; 13th | × | × | • | × | × | × | × | • | • | • | • | R1; 20th | • | • | • | • | • | • | R1; 31st | • | R3; 15th | | | 4/16 |
| Libya | | | | | | | | × | • | × | • | × | • | × | × | × | • | • | • | • | • | • | • | | | 0/10 |
| Morocco | | | | | | | • | × | R1; 14th | • | • | • | R2; 11th | • | R1; 23rd | R1; 18th | • | • | • | • | R1; 27th | 4th | QF; T-7th | Q | | 7/16 |
| Tunisia | | | | | | | • | × | • | • | R1; 9th | • | • | • | • | R1; 26th | R1; 29th | R1; 24th | • | • | R1; 24th | R1; 21st | R1; 47th | | | 7/16 |
| Total (6 teams) | 0 | 1 | 0 | 0 | 0 | 0 | 0 | 0 | 1 | 0 | 1 | 1 | 2 | 1 | 1 | 2 | 1 | 1 | 1 | 1 | 3 | 2 | 4 | TBD | TBD | 19 |

Firsts

- 1934: Egypt first African team to qualify for the World Cup
- 1970: Morocco first African team to draw a match in the World Cup
- 1978: Tunisia first African team to win a match in the World Cup
- 1982: Algeria first African team to win two matches in the World Cup
- 1986: Algeria first African team to qualify two consecutive World Cups
- 1986: Morocco first African team to reach the knockout stage (round of sixteen)
- 2022: Morocco first African team to reach the semi-finals

=== Olympic Games for Men ===
Olympic Games (Men's tournament) record
| Team | 1900 (France) (3) | 1904 (United States) (3) | 1908 (United Kingdom) (6) | 1912 (Sweden) (11) | 1920 (Belgium) (14) | 1924 (France) (22) | 1928 (Netherlands) (17) | 1936 (Germany) (16) | 1948 (United Kingdom) (18) | 1952 (Finland) (25) | 1956 (Australia) (11) | 1960 (Italy) (16) | 1964 (Japan) (14) | 1968 (Mexico) (16) | 1972 (West Germany) (16) | 1976 (Canada) (13) | 1980 (Soviet Union) (16) | 1984 (United States) (16) | 1988 (South Korea) (16) | 1992 (Spain) (16) | 1996 (United States) (16) | 2000 (Australia) (16) | 2004 (Greece) (16) | 2008 (China) (16) | 2012 (United Kingdom) (16) | 2016 (Brazil) (16) | 2020 (Japan) (16) | 2024 (France) (16) | 2028 (United States) (12) | Years |
|---|---|---|---|---|---|---|---|---|---|---|---|---|---|---|---|---|---|---|---|---|---|---|---|---|---|---|---|---|---|---|
| Algeria | | | | | | | | | | | | | × | • | • | • | QF; 8th | • | • | • | • | • | • | • | • | R1; 14th | • | • | | 2/15 |
| Egypt | | | | | R1; 8th | QF; 8th | 4th | R1; 9th | R1; 11th | R1; 9th | •• | R1; 12th | 4th | × | • | • | •• | QF; 8th | • | R1; 12th | • | • | • | • | QF; 8th | • | QF; 8th | 4th | | 13/23 |
| Libya | | | | | | | | | | × | × | × | • | × | • | × | • | • | × | × | × | × | • | • | • | × | • | • | | 0/8 |
| Morocco | | | | | | | | | | | | • | R1; 13th | •• | QF; 8th | • | • | R1; 12th | • | R1; 15 | • | R1; 16th | R1; 10th | • | R1; 11th | • | • | 3rd | | 8/17 |
| Tunisia | | | | | | | | | | | × | R1; 15th | • | • | • | • | • | • | R1; 13th | • | R1; 14th | • | R1; 12th | • | • | • | • | • | | 4/17 |
| Total (6 teams) | 0 | 0 | 0 | 0 | 1 | 1 | 1 | 1 | 1 | 1 | 0 | 2 | 2 | 0 | 1 | 0 | 1 | 2 | 1 | 2 | 1 | 1 | 2 | 0 | 2 | 1 | 1 | 2 | | 27 |

=== Africa Cup of Nations ===
Africa Cup of Nations record
| Team | (Sudan) 1957 (3) | (United Arab Republic) 1959 (3) | (Ethiopia) 1962 (4) | (Ghana) 1963 (6) | (Tunisia) 1965 (6) | (Ethiopia) 1968 (8) | (Sudan) 1970 (8) | (Cameroon) 1972 (8) | (Egypt) 1974 (8) | (Ethiopia) 1976 (8) | (Ghana) 1978 (8) | (Nigeria) 1980 (8) | (Libya) 1982 (8) | (Ivory Coast) 1984 (8) | (Egypt) 1986 (8) | (Morocco) 1988 (8) | (Algeria) 1990 (8) | (Senegal) 1992 (12) | (Tunisia) 1994 (12) | (South Africa) 1996 (15) | (Burkina Faso) 1998 (16) | (Ghana) (Nigeria) 2000 (16) | (Mali) 2002 (16) | (Tunisia) 2004 (16) | (Egypt) 2006 (16) | (Ghana) 2008 (16) | (Angola) 2010 (15) | (Equatorial Guinea) (Gabon) 2012 (16) | (South Africa) 2013 (16) | (Equatorial Guinea) 2015 (16) | (Gabon) 2017 (16) | (Egypt) 2019 (24) | (Cameroon) 2021 (24) | (Ivory Coast) 2023 (24) | (Morocco) 2025 (24) | (Kenya) (Tanzania) (Uganda) 2027 (24) | Years |
|---|---|---|---|---|---|---|---|---|---|---|---|---|---|---|---|---|---|---|---|---|---|---|---|---|---|---|---|---|---|---|---|---|---|---|---|---|---|
| Algeria | | | | | × | GS | • | • | • | • | • | 2nd | 4th | 3rd | GS | 3rd | 1st | GS | •• | QF | GS | QF | GS | QF | • | • | 4th | • | GS | QF | GS | 1st | GS | GS | QF | | 21/30 |
| Egypt | 1st | 1st | 2nd | 3rd | × | × | 3rd | • | 3rd | 4th | • | 4th | × | 4th | 1st | GS | GS | GS | QF | QF | 1st | QF | QF | GS | 1st | 1st | 1st | • | • | • | 2nd | R2 | 2nd | R2 | 4th | | 27/32 |
| Libya | | | | | | • | × | • | × | × | × | × | 2nd | • | • | × | × | × | × | × | × | • | • | • | GS | • | • | GS | • | • | • | • | • | • | • | | 3/19 |
| Morocco | | | × | • | × | × | • | GS | × | 1st | GS | 3rd | • | • | 4th | 4th | • | GS | • | • | QF | GS | GS | 2nd | GS | GS | • | GS | GS | •• | QF | R2 | QF | R2 | 1st | | 20/29 |
| Tunisia | | | 3rd | GS | 2nd | • | × | × | × | • | 4th | × | GS | • | • | • | • | • | GS | 2nd | QF | 4th | GS | 1st | QF | QF | GS | QF | GS | QF | QF | 4th | QF | GS | R16 | | 22/29 |
| Total (6 teams) | 1 | 1 | 2 | 2 | 1 | 1 | 1 | 1 | 1 | 2 | 2 | 3 | 3 | 2 | 3 | 3 | 2 | 3 | 2 | 3 | 4 | 4 | 4 | 4 | 4 | 3 | 3 | 3 | 3 | 2 | 4 | 5 | 5 | 5 | 4 | TBD | 96 |

=== African Nations Championship ===
African Nations Championship record
| Team | 2009 (Ivory Coast) (8) | 2011 (Sudan) (16) | 2014 (South Africa) (16) | 2016 (Rwanda) (16) | 2018 (Kenya) (16) | 2020 (Cameroon) (16) | 2022 (Algeria) (17) | 2024 (Kenya) (Tanzania) (Uganda) (TBD) | Years |
|---|---|---|---|---|---|---|---|---|---|
| Algeria | • | 4th | × | × | • | • | 2nd | QF | 3/6 |
| Egypt | × | × | × | × | • | × | × | × | 0/1 |
| Libya | GS | • | 1st | • | 4th | GS | GS | × | 5/7 |
| Morocco | • | • | QF | GS | 1st | 1st | •• | 1st | 5/8 |
| Tunisia | • | 1st | • | QF | × | •• | × | •• | 2/6 |
| Total (6 teams) | 1 | 2 | 3 | 2 | 3 | 2 | 3 | 3 | 19 |

=== FIFA Futsal World Cup ===
FIFA Futsal World Cup record
| Team | 1989 (Netherlands) (16) | 1992 (Hong Kong) (16) | 1996 (Spain) (16) | 2000 (Guatemala) (16) | 2004 (Taiwan) (16) | 2008 (Brazil) (20) | 2012 (Thailand) (24) | 2016 (Colombia) (24) | 2021 (Lithuania) (24) | 2024 (Uzbekistan) (24) | 2028 (24) | Years |
|---|---|---|---|---|---|---|---|---|---|---|---|---|
| Algeria | R1; 15th | × | × | × | × | × | × | × | • | • | | 1/3 |
| Egypt | × | × | R1; 12th | R2; 6th | R1; 9th | R1; 13th | R2; 14th | QF; 8th | R1; 19th | • | | 7/8 |
| Libya | × | × | × | • | × | R1; 16th | R1; 24th | • | • | R1; 18th | | 3/6 |
| Morocco | × | × | × | • | • | • | R1; 23rd | R1; 20th | QF; 8th | QF; 7th | | 4/7 |
| Tunisia | × | × | × | × | × | • | • | • | × | × | | 0/3 |
| Total (6 teams) | 1 | 0 | 1 | 1 | 1 | 2 | 3 | 2 | 2 | 2 | | 15 |

=== Futsal Africa Cup of Nations ===
Futsal Africa Cup of Nations record
| Team | (Egypt) 1996 | (Egypt) 2000 | h/a 2004 | (Libya) 2008 | (Burkina Faso) ~~2011~~ | (South Africa) 2016 | (Morocco) 2020 | (Morocco) 2024 | (Morocco) 2026 | Years |
|---|---|---|---|---|---|---|---|---|---|---|
| Algeria | × | × | × | × | | × | • | • | 4th | 1/3 |
| Egypt | 1st | 1st | 1st | 2nd | | 2nd | 2nd | 4th | 3rd | 8/8 |
| Libya | × | 3rd | × | 1st | | R1 | 4th | 3rd | R1 | 6/6 |
| Morocco | × | 2nd | 3rd | 3rd | | 1st | 1st | 1st | 1st | 7/7 |
| Tunisia | × | × | × | R1 | | R1 | × | × | × | 2/2 |
| Total (6 teams) | 1 | 3 | 2 | 4 | − | 4 | 3 | 4 | 4 | 25 |

=== FIFA Beach Soccer World Cup ===
| Year Team | Beach Soccer World Championships | | | | | | | | | | FIFA Beach Soccer World Cup | | | | | | | | | | | | | | Appearances | | |
| Year Team | 1995 (Brazil) (8) | 1996 (Brazil) (8) | 1997 (Brazil) (8) | 1998 (Brazil) (10) | 1999 (Brazil) (12) | 2000 (Brazil) (12) | 2001 (Brazil) (12) | 2002 (Brazil) (8) | 2003 (Brazil) (8) | 2004 (Brazil) (12) | 2005 (Brazil) (12) | 2006 (Brazil) (16) | 2007 (Brazil) (16) | 2008 (France) (16) | 2009 (United Arab Emirates) (16) | 2011 (Italy) (16) | 2013 (French Polynesia) (16) | 2015 (Portugal) (16) | 2017 (The Bahamas) (16) | 2019 (Paraguay) (16) | 2021 (Russia) (16) | 2024 (United Arab Emirates) (16) | 2025 (Seychelles) (16) | 2027 (16) | WC /10 | FIFA /13 | Total /23 |
|---|---|---|---|---|---|---|---|---|---|---|---|---|---|---|---|---|---|---|---|---|---|---|---|---|---|---|---|
| Egypt | • | • | • | • | • | • | • | • | • | • | × | • | • | • | • | • | • | • | • | • | • | R1; 12th | • | | 0 | 1 | 1 |
| Total (1 team) | 0 | 0 | 0 | 0 | 0 | 0 | 0 | 0 | 0 | 0 | 0 | 0 | 0 | 0 | 0 | 0 | 0 | 0 | 0 | 0 | 0 | 1 | 0 | | 0 | 1 | 1 |

=== Beach Soccer Africa Cup of Nations ===
Beach Soccer Africa Cup of Nations record
| Year Team | 2006 (South Africa) (6) | 2007 (South Africa) (8) | 2008 (South Africa) (8) | 2009 (South Africa) (9) | 2011 (Morocco) (9) | 2013 (Morocco) (8) | 2015 (Seychelles) (8) | 2016 (Nigeria) (8) | 2018 (Egypt) (8) | 2021 (Senegal) (7) | 2022 (Mozambique) (8) | 2024 (Egypt) (8) | 2026 (?) | Apps /12 |
|---|---|---|---|---|---|---|---|---|---|---|---|---|---|---|
| Algeria | × | × | × | × | 6th | × | × | × | × | × | × | × | | 1 |
| Egypt | 3rd | 5th | 4th | 4th | 3rd | R1 | 6th | 3rd | 3rd | 5th | 2nd | 4th | | 12 |
| Libya | × | × | × | R1 | 8th | R1 | × | 8th | 8th | × | × | × | | 5 |
| Morocco | 6th | × | × | 5th | 5th | 3rd | 5th | 4th | 4th | 3rd | 3rd | 3rd | | 10 |
| Tunisia | × | × | × | × | × | × | × | × | × | × | × | × | | 0 |
| Total (5 teams) | 2 | 1 | 1 | 3 | 4 | 3 | 2 | 3 | 3 | 2 | 2 | 2 | | 30 |

=== Former tournaments ===
==== FIFA Confederations Cup ====
FIFA Confederations Cup record
| Team | 1992 (Saudi Arabia) (4) | 1995 (Saudi Arabia) (6) | 1997 (Saudi Arabia) (8) | 1999 (Mexico) (8) | 2001 (South Korea) (Japan) (8) | 2003 (France) (8) | 2005 (Germany) (8) | 2009 (South Africa) (8) | 2013 (Brazil) (8) | 2017 (Russia) (8) | Years |
|---|---|---|---|---|---|---|---|---|---|---|---|
| Egypt | • | • | • | R1; 7th | • | • | • | R1; 6th | • | • | 2/10 |
| Tunisia | • | • | • | • | • | • | R1; 6th | • | • | • | 1/10 |
| Total (2 teams) | 0 | 0 | 0 | 1 | 0 | 0 | 1 | 1 | 0 | 0 | 3 |

== Rankings ==
=== Football ===
FIFA Rankings (as of 7 October 2026)
| UNAF* | FIFA | +/− | National Team | Points |
|---|---|---|---|---|
| 1 | 7 | ▼1 | Morocco | 1805.34 |
| 2 | 25 | ▼1 | Egypt | 1585.86 |
| 3 | 28 | ▲1 | Algeria | 1574.77 |
| 4 | 61 | ▼4 | Tunisia | 1415.38 |
| 5 | 113 | ▼3 | Libya | 1168.89 |

FIFA Rankings (as of 20 October 2026)
| UNAF* | FIFA | +/− | National Team | Points |
|---|---|---|---|---|
| 1 | 64 | Steady | Morocco | 1384.71 |
| 2 | 73 | ▲1 | Algeria | 1346.06 |
| 3 | 107 | ▼5 | Tunisia | 1174.95 |
| 4 | 113 | ▼14 | Egypt | 1159.69 |
| 5 | 188 | Steady | Libya | 739.94 |

=== Futsal ===
FIFA Rankings (as of 24 September 2026)
| UNAF* | FIFA | +/− | National Team | Points |
|---|---|---|---|---|
| 1 | 6 | Steady | Morocco | 1497.3 |
| 2 | 41 | ▼1 | Egypt | 1087.78 |
| 3 | 52 | ▲1 | Libya | 1048.27 |
| 4 | 93 | ▼4 | Algeria | 937.31 |

FIFA Rankings (as of 24 September 2026)
| UNAF* | FIFA | +/− | National Team | Points |
|---|---|---|---|---|
| 1 | 26 | ▼2 | Morocco | 987.04 |
| 2 | 85 | Steady | Egypt | 733.75 |

=== Beach Soccer ===
BSWW Rankings (as of 2 September 2026)
| UNAF* | BSWW | +/− | National Team | Points |
|---|---|---|---|---|
| 1 | 18 | ▼2 | Morocco | 583 |
| 2 | 24 | ▲2 | Egypt | 445.75 |
| 3 | 76 | ▼4 | Libya | 49 |

== African school football championship ==
Regional champions of UNAF, representing their regions in the final stage of the tournament.

| Year | National team (M) | National team (F) |
|---|---|---|
| 2023 | Algeria | Morocco |
| 2024 | Libya | Morocco |
| 2025 | Algeria | Morocco |
| 2026 | Morocco | Morocco |

== Controversy ==
On 20 November 2009, the Egyptian Football Association withdrew its membership citing the incidents that accompanied the playoff between Egypt and Algeria, but returned in 2011.

== See also ==
- Confederation of African Football (CAF)
- Central African Football Federations' Union (UNIFFAC)
- Council for East and Central Africa Football Associations (CECAFA)
- Council of Southern Africa Football Associations (COSAFA)
- West African Football Union (WAFU)
