= 2026 UNAF U-17 Women's Tournament =

Tournament details
- Host country: Tunisia
- Dates: 18–22 July
- Teams: 4
- Venues: 2 (in 2 host cities)

Final positions
- Champions: Morocco (2nd title)
- Runners-up: Tunisia
- Third place: Botswana
- Fourth place: Libya

The 2026 UNAF U-17 Women's Tournament was the 2nd edition of the UNAF U-17 Women's Tournament, the international women's youth football championship contested by the under-20 national teams of the member associations of UNAF (North Africa). The tournament took place in Tunisia, from between 18 and 22 July 2026.

Morocco, the defending champion, won the title for the second time.

== Participants ==
The four participating teams were:

- Botswana (Invitee)
- Morocco (Holders)
- Libya
- Tunisia (Hosts)

== Venues ==
City	Stadium	Capacity
Le Kram	Le Kram Municipal Stadium	5,000
Ariana	Ariana Municipal Stadium	7,000

== Tournament ==
All times are local, CET (UTC+1)

Pos	Team	Pld	W	D	L	GF	GA	GD	Pts	Final result
1	Morocco	3	2	1	0	15	4	+11	7	Champions
2	Tunisia (H)	3	2	0	1	16	4	+12	6	Runners-up
3	Botswana	3	1	1	1	6	3	+3	4	Third place
4	Libya	3	0	0	3	0	26	−26	0	Fourth place

Source: UNAF
Rules for classification: Group stage tiebreakers
(H) Hosts

=== Matches ===
18 July 2026
17:30

Tunisia	11−0	Libya
Mhiri 5', 40+5'; Guizani 15'; Selmi 24', 27'; Boujatla 40+3'; Jeljli 57'; Bel Hadj 66'; Bouajila 68'; Larribi 77', 79'	Report

Ariana Municipal Stadium, Ariana
Referee: Asma Nassar (Egypt)
18 July 2026
17:30

Morocco	1−1	Botswana
Wachol 53'	Report	Kelekabile 57'

Le Kram Municipal Stadium, Le Kram
Referee: Hawaa Ben Rachi (Algeria)

20 July 2026
17:30

Morocco	10−0	Libya
	Report	Benouda 1'; Benyebka 3'; Jnah 6', 28'; Kasmi 40+5'; Doudouh 48'; Aboularouah 50'; El Allali 69'; El Manouti 71'; Mikou 79'

Le Kram Municipal Stadium, Le Kram
Referee: Rouaa Ben Chedli (Tunisia)
20 July 2026
17:30

Tunisia	2−0	Botswana
Mhiri 30'; Ayari 85'	Report

Ariana Municipal Stadium, Ariana
Referee: Naila Berkani (Morocco)

22 July 2026
17:30

Libya	0−5	Botswana
	Report	14'; 20'; 25'; 47'; 54'

Le Kram Municipal Stadium, Le Kram
22 July 2026
17:30

Tunisia	3−4	Morocco
Guizani 2' (pen.); Golonka 40+2'; Selmi 44'	Report	Aagaou 7'; Wachol 18'; Tasnim Baghouz 24'; El Manouti 78'

Ariana Municipal Stadium, Ariana
Referee: Asma Nassar (Egypt)
