= 2024 UNAF U-17 Women's Tournament =

Tournament details
- Host country: Tunisia
- Dates: 3–7 September
- Teams: 4
- Venues: 2 (in 2 host cities)

Final positions
- Champions: Tanzania (2nd title)
- Runners-up: Tunisia
- Third place: Morocco
- Fourth place: Egypt

Tournament statistics
- Matches played: 6
- Goals scored: 20 (3.33 per match)

The 2024 UNAF U-17 Women's Tournament was the 1st edition of the UNAF U-17 Women's Tournament, the international women's youth football championship contested by the under-20 national teams of the member associations of UNAF (North Africa). The tournament took place in Tunisia, from between 3 and 7 September 2024.

Guests Tanzania won the title after topping the group.

== Participants ==
The four participating teams were:

- Egypt
- Morocco
- Tanzania (Invitee)
- Tunisia (Hosts)

== Venue ==
City	Stadium	Capacity
Le Kram	Le Kram Municipal Stadium	5,000
Ariana	Ariana Municipal Stadium	7,000

== Tournament ==
All times are local, CET (UTC+1)

Pos	Team	Pld	W	D	L	GF	GA	GD	Pts	Final result
1	Tanzania	3	2	1	0	9	5	+4	7	Champions
2	Tunisia (H)	3	2	1	0	4	1	+3	7	Runners-up
3	Morocco	3	0	1	2	4	8	−4	1	Third place
4	Egypt	3	0	1	2	3	7	−4	1	

Source: UNAF
Rules for classification: Group stage tiebreakers
(H) Hosts

=== Matches ===
3 September 2024
14:30

Tanzania	4−1	Egypt
Mwarabu 37', 53'; Mitoga 39'; Mnunduka 79'	Report	Mohamed 80+4'

Le Kram Municipal Stadium, Le Kram
3 September 2024
14:30

Morocco	0−2	Tunisia
	Report	Ben Kaabia 53', 80+4'

Ariana Stadium, Ariana

5 September 2024
14:30

Tanzania	5−3	Morocco
Mourabi 11', 40+1'; Joseph 48'; Gerald 62', 63'	Report	Damouni 25'; Elyousfi 34'; Bou Ghazi 80+4'

Ariana Stadium, Ariana
5 September 2024
14:30

Egypt	1−2	Tunisia
Othman 75'	Report	Kaabia 34'; Meji 55'

Le Kram Municipal Stadium, Le Kram

7 September 2024
14:30

Tanzania	0−0	Tunisia
	Report

Ariana Stadium, Ariana
7 September 2024
14:30

Morocco	1−1	Egypt
Ghazi 5'	Report	Mohamed 75'

Le Kram Municipal Stadium, Le Kram

== Goalscorers ==
There were 20 goals scored in 6 matches, for an average of 3.33 goals per match (as of 8 September 2024).

4 goals

- (Tanzania) Mwatima Mwarabu

2 goals

- (Tanzania) Yasinta Joseph Mitoga
- (Tunisia) Yasmine Ben Kaabia
- (Egypt) Hanna Mohamed Othman
- (Morocco) Charaf Boughazi

1 goal

- (Tanzania) Winfrida Gerald
- (Tanzania) Jamila Rajabu Mnunduka
- (Morocco) Danya Damouni
- (Morocco) Wahba Elyousfi
- (Tunisia) Yasmine Ben Kaabia
- (Tunisia) Wided Meji
- (Egypt) Farida Mouhamed
