= Burkina Faso women's national under-20 football team =

Women's under-20 youth team for national football in Burkina Faso

Burkina Faso Under-20
- Association: Burkinabé Football Federation
- Confederation: CAF
- Sub-confederation: WAFU (West Africa)
- FIFA code: BFA
| First colours | Second colours |

African U-20 World Cup qualification
- Appearances: 3 (first in 2015)
- Best result: Round 2 (2015)

The Burkina Faso women's national under-20 football team is the women's under-20 youth team for national football in Burkina Faso. The team is controlled by the Burkinabé Football Federation.

In 2015, the team reached the second round in the 2015 African U-20 Women's World Cup Qualifying Tournament.

The team finished in second place in the 2019 UNAF U-20 Women's Tournament, the 1st edition of the UNAF U-20 Women's Tournament.

The team qualified for the 2022 WAFU U20 Women's Cup to be held in Ghana.

== Competitive record ==
=== FIFA U-20 Women's World Cup record ===
FIFA U-20 Women's World Cup
| Year | Result | Matches | Wins | Draws* | Losses | GF | GA |
|---|---|---|---|---|---|---|---|
| (Canada) 2002 | Did not qualify | | | | | | |
| (Thailand) 2004 | Did not qualify | | | | | | |
| (Russia) 2006 | Did not qualify | | | | | | |
| (Chile) 2008 | Did not qualify | | | | | | |
| (Germany) 2010 | Did not qualify | | | | | | |
| (Japan) 2012 | Did not qualify | | | | | | |
| (Canada) 2014 | Did not qualify | | | | | | |
| (Papua New Guinea) 2016 | Did not qualify | | | | | | |
| (France) 2018 | Did not qualify | | | | | | |
| (Costa Rica) 2022 | Did not qualify | | | | | | |
| (Colombia) 2024 | Did not qualify | | | | | | |
| (Poland) 2026 | Did not qualify | | | | | | |
| Total | 0/12 | 0 | 0 | 0 | 0 | 0 | 0 |

=== African U-20 Women's World Cup Qualification record ===
African U-20 Women's World Cup qualification
Appearances: 3
| Year | Round | Position | Pld | W | D | L | GF | GA |
|---|---|---|---|---|---|---|---|---|
| 2002 | Did not enter | | | | | | | |
| 2004 | Did not enter | | | | | | | |
| 2006 | Did not enter | | | | | | | |
| 2008 | Did not enter | | | | | | | |
| 2010 | Did not enter | | | | | | | |
| 2012 | Did not enter | | | | | | | |
| 2014 | Did not enter | | | | | | | |
| 2015 | Round 2 | 8th | 6 | 3 | 2 | 1 | 10 | 4 |
| 2018 | Did not enter | | | | | | | |
| 2022 | Round 2 | 32nd | 2 | 1 | 0 | 1 | 1 | 1 |
| 2024 | Round 2 | 32nd | 2 | 0 | 1 | 1 | 1 | 5 |
| 2026 | Did not enter | | | | | | | |
| Total | 3/11 | 0 Title | 10 | 4 | 3 | 3 | 12 | 10 |

== See also ==
- Burkina Faso women's national football team
