= Armelle Khellas =

Algerian footballer (born 2001)

Personal information
- Full name: Armelle Khellas Aït-Sahed
- Date of birth: 25 June 2001 (age 25)
- Place of birth: Vaulx-en-Velin, Auvergne-Rhône-Alpes, France
- Position: Defender

Team information
- Current team: Grenoble Foot 38
- Number: 11

Youth career
- 2007–2010: FC Vaulx-en-Velin
- 2010–2020: Olympique Lyonnais

Senior career*
Years	Team	Apps	(Gls)
2020–2022	Albi-Marssac	19	(0)
2022–2023	SS Lazio	11	(0)
2023–	Grenoble Foot 38	12	(0)

International career^{‡}
2020–2021	Algeria U20	2	(0)
2021–	Algeria	4	(0)
- * Club domestic league appearances and goals as of 16 March 2024 ‡ National team caps and goals as of 7 April 2024

Armelle Khellas Aït-Sahed (Arabic: أرميل خلاص آيت ساهد; born 25 June 2001) is a professional footballer who plays as a defender for Division 3 Féminine club Grenoble Foot 38. Born in France, she represents the Algeria national team.

== Club career ==
Khellas began playing football at the age of six at FC Vaulx-en-Velin. She then joined the academy of Olympique Lyonnais, where she completed her development. In June 2020, after spending ten years at the club, she signed with Albi-Marssac in Division 2 Féminine.

After two seasons with Albi, she moved to Italy in August 2021, signing with Serie B club SS Lazio. She spent one season with the club before returning to France, where she signed with Division 3 Féminine club Grenoble.

== International career ==
Khellas is a former Algerian youth international, having been selected for the Under-20 team by coach Ahmed Laribi in January 2020 to participate in a double confrontation against South Sudan as part of the first qualifying round for the 2020 African U-20 Women's World Cup qualification. She was a starter in both matches, which resulted in a 0–5 victory in the first leg in Kampala, and a 4–0 victory in Algiers.

In September 2021, Khellas received her first call-up to the senior team to participate in a training camp for the 2022 Women's Africa Cup of Nations qualification. In October 2021, she was included in the final squad to participate in the double confrontation against Sudan as part of the 2022 AFCON qualifiers but wasn't capped. In November 2021, she was again called up for two friendly matches against Tunisia. On 25 November 2021, she earned her first cap as a starter in a 1–0 win against Tunisia.

== Career statistics ==
=== Club ===
As of match played 10 March 2023

Appearances and goals by club, season and competition
Club	Season	League			Cup		Total	
Club	Season	Division	Apps	Goals	Apps	Goals	Apps	Goals
Albi-Marssac	2020–21	D2F	2	0	0	0	2	0
Albi-Marssac	2021–22	D2F	14	0	3	0	17	0
Albi-Marssac	Total		16	0	3	0	19	0
SS Lazio	2022–23	Serie B	11	0	0	0	11	0
SS Lazio	Total		11	0	0	0	11	0
Grenoble Foot 38	2023–24	D3F	11	0	1	0	12	0
Grenoble Foot 38	Total		11	0	1	0	12	0
Career total			38	0	4	0	42	0

=== International ===
As of match played 7 April 2024

Appearances and goals by national team and year
National team	Year	Apps	Goals
Algeria	2021	2	0
Algeria	2023	0	0
Algeria	2024	2	0
Total		4	0
