= Amélia Zemma =

Algerian footballer (born 2005)

Personal information
- Full name: Amélia Maelys Zemma
- Date of birth: 17 December 2005 (age 20)
- Place of birth: Lyon, France
- Position: Forward

Team information
- Current team: Lyon B
- Number: 15

Youth career
- 2012–2014: USM Meyzieu
- 2015–2016: UE Est Lyonnais Foot
- 2016–2017: USM Meyzieu
- 2017–2023: Lyon

Senior career*
Years	Team	Apps	(Gls)
2023–2024	Lyon B	13	(3)
2024–	AAS Sarcelles	2	(0)

International career^{‡}
2023–	Algeria U20	6	(3)
2024–	Algeria	1	(0)
- * Club domestic league appearances and goals as of 1 May 2024 ‡ National team caps and goals as of 7 April 2024

Amélia Maelys Zemma (Arabic: اميليا مايليس زمة; born 17 December 2005) is a professional footballer who plays as a forward for Division 3 Féminine side AAS Sarcelles. Born in France, she represents Algeria at international level.

== Club career ==
Zemma began her football career with USM Meyzieu, playing there from 2012 to 2014. She then joined U.S. Est Lyonnais Foot for one year before returning to USM Meyzieu. After one season, she joined the academy and youth teams of Olympique Lyonnais.

She won the under-19 French championship twice in 2022 and 2024 with Lyon.

== International career ==
Zemma was part of Algeria squad for the 2023 UNAF U-20 Women's Tournament. Despite finishing second, she was the top scorer of the tournament with three goals. In October 2023, she was selected for the 2024 African U-20 Women's World Cup qualification matches against Mali.

On 22 February 2024, Zemma received her first call-up to the Senior Algeria team for two friendly matches against Burkina Faso. On 24 February 2024 she made her debut coming on as a substitute for Lina Boussaha in the 65th minute.

== Career statistics ==
=== Club ===
As of match played 1 May 2024

Appearances and goals by club, season and competition
Club	Season	League			Cup		Continental		Other		Total	
Club	Season	Division	Apps	Goals	Apps	Goals	Apps	Goals	Apps	Goals	Apps	Goals
Lyon B	2023–24	D3F	9	2	—		—		—		9	2
Career total			9	2	—		—		—		9	2

=== International ===
As of match played 7 April 2024

Appearances and goals by national team and year
National team	Year	Apps	Goals
Algeria	2024	1	0
Total		1	0

== Honours ==
Individual

- UNAF U-20 Women's Tournament Top scorer: 2023
