= Khouloud Ournani =

Algerian footballer (born 2003)

Personal information
- Date of birth: 23 July 2003 (age 23)
- Place of birth: Algiers, Algeria
- Position: Forward

Team information
- Current team: Al Hmmah Club
- Number: 90

Senior career*
| Years | Team | Apps | (Gls) |
| –2022 | ASE Alger Centre | | |
| 2022–2024 | CS Constantine | | |
| 2024–2026 | CF Akbou | | |
| 2026– | Al Hmmah Club | 7 | (13) |

International career
| 2019–2023 | Algeria U20 | | |
| 2023– | Algeria | | |
- * Club domestic league appearances and goals

Khouloud Ournani (Arabic: خلود ورناني; born 23 July 2003) is an Algerian professional footballer who plays as a forward for Saudi Women's First Division League club Al-Hmmah and the Algeria national team.

== Club career ==
On 15 July 2024, Ournani joined CF Akbou, becoming the club's first signing of the summer transfer window. She signed ahead of the club's participation in the 2024 CAF Women's Champions League UNAF Qualifiers.

During the 2025–26 season, she scored 46 goals in 24 appearances, setting a record for the most goals scored in a single season in Algerian women's football. She was subsequently named Player of the Season.

On 16 September 2026, Saudi Women's First Division League club Al-Hmmah announced the signing of the player.

== International career ==
In September 2019, Ournani was called to the national under-20 team for the 2019 UNAF U-20 Women's Tournament. She scored five goals in an 8–0 victory over Tunisia before netting Algeria's consolation goal against Morocco, bringing her tally to six goals and making her the tournament's top scorer. In January 2020, she was included in Algeria's squad for the two-legged qualifying tie against South Sudan in the 2020 African U-20 Women's World Cup qualification, scoring in the return leg. She last represented the under-20 side at the 2023 UNAF U-20 Women's Tournament.

In April 2023, Ournani got her first call-up to the senior team by head coach Farid Benstiti for friendly matches against Tanzania. In July 2026, she made Algeria final squad for the 2026 Women's Africa Cup of Nations.
