= UNAF U-21 Women's Tournament =

- Organiser(s): UNAF
- Founded: 2019; 7 years ago
- Region: North Africa
- Teams: 5 (plus guests)
- Current champions: Algeria (1st title)
- Most championships: Algeria (1 title)
- Website: unafonline.org

The UNAF U-21 Women's Tournament is an international women's football tournament organized by the Union of North African Football (UNAF) for its nations consisting of players under the age of 21. However, the tournament invites teams from other nations. Algeria are the most successful nation winning the tournament one time.

== Results ==
| Ed. | Year | Host | First place game | | | Third place game | | |
| Ed. | Year | Host | (gold) Champion | Score | (silver) Runner-up | (bronze) Third place | Score | Fourth place |
|---|---|---|---|---|---|---|---|---|
| 1 | 2019 | Algeria | Algeria | round-robin | Morocco | Tanzania | round-robin | Egypt |

== Statistics ==
=== Summary ===
| Team | Winners | Runners-up | Third place | Fourth place |
|---|---|---|---|---|
| Algeria | 1 (2019*) | — | — | — |
| Morocco | — | 1 (2019) | — | — |
| Tanzania | — | — | 1 (2019) | — |
| Egypt | — | — | — | 1 (2019) |

* Hosts
Italic Invited nation

=== Participating nations ===
| Team | (Algeria) 2019 | Apps. |
|---|---|---|
| Algeria | 1st | 1 |
| Morocco | 2nd | 1 |
| Egypt | 4th | 1 |
Invited nations
| Tanzania | 3rd | 1 |

- 1st – Champions
- 2nd – Runners-up
- 3rd – Third place
- 4th – Fourth place
- — Hosts

== See also ==
- UNAF Women's Tournament
- UNAF U-20 Women's Tournament
- UNAF U-17 Women's Tournament
