= Tunisia women's national under-17 football team =

Tunisia women's U-17
- Nickname(s): نسور قرطاج (Eagles of Carthage)
- Association: Tunisian Football Federation
- Other affiliation: UAFA (Arab World)
- Confederation: CAF (Africa)
- Sub-confederation: UNAF (North Africa)
- Home stadium: Hammadi Agrebi Stadium
- FIFA code: TUN
First colours	Second colours	Third colours

UNAF U-17 Women's Tournament
- Appearances: 1 (first in 2024)
- Best result: Runner up (2024, 2026)

The Tunisia women's national under-17 football team has represented Tunisia in women's international association football for players aged 17 or under. The team is administered by the Tunisian Football Federation (TFF), which governs football in Tunisia. On a continental level, the team competes under the Confederation of African Football (CAF), which governs associate football in Africa, and is also affiliated with FIFA for global competitions. Additionally, the team is a member of the Union of North African Football (UNAF) and the Union of Arab Football Associations (UAFA). The team is colloquially known as Eagles of Carthage by fans and the media, with the bald eagle serving as its symbol. Their home kit is primarily white and their away kit is red, which is a reference to the national flag of the country.

The team participated twice in the UNAF U-17 Women's Tournament in 2024 and 2026, with both editions held on its home soil; the team finished in second place on both occasions.

== Competitive Records ==
Champions Runners-up Third place Fourth place

- Red border color indicates tournament was held on home soil.

=== FIFA U-17 Women's World Cup ===
FIFA U-17 Women's World Cup record									African U-17 Women's World Cup qualification record					
Year	Round	Position	Pld	W	D*	L	GF	GA	Pld	W	D*	L	GF	GA
(New Zealand) 2008	Did not enter								Did not enter					
(Trinidad and Tobago) 2010	Did not qualify								6	2	1	3	7	13
(Azerbaijan) 2012	Did not qualify								4	2	0	2	7	3
(Costa Rica) 2014	Did not enter								Did not enter					
(Jordan) 2016	Did not enter								Did not enter					
(Uruguay) 2018	Withdrew								Withdrew					
(India) 2022	Did not enter								Did not enter					
(Dominican Republic) 2024	Did not enter								Did not enter					
(Morocco) 2025	Did not qualify								2	0	1	1	0	1
(Morocco) 2026	Did not qualify								2	0	1	1	2	3
(Morocco) 2027	To be determined								To be determined					
(Morocco) 2028	To be determined								To be determined					
(Morocco) 2029	To be determined								To be determined					
Total	–	0/11	–	–	–	–	–	–	14	4	3	7	16	20

=== UNAF U-17 Women's Tournament ===
UNAF U-17 Women's Tournament record
Year	Round	Position	Pld	W	D*	L	GF	GA
(Tunisia) 2024	Runner-up	2nd	3	2	0	1	4	1
(Tunisia) 2026	Runner-up	2nd	3	2	0	1	16	4
Total	Runner-up	2/2	6	4	0	2	20	5

== Honours ==
- UNAF U-17 Women's Tournament

(silver) Runners-up (2): 2024, 2026

== See also ==
- Tunisia women's national football team
- Tunisia women's national under-20 football team
