= Libyan Football Federation =

Governing body of association football in Libya

CAF
- Short name: LFF
- Founded: 1962
- Headquarters: Tripoli
- FIFA affiliation: 1964
- CAF affiliation: 1965
- UNAF affiliation: 2005
- President: Abdolmola El Mograbi

The Libyan Football Federation (Arabic: الاتحاد الليبي لكرة القدم; abbreviated as LFF) is the governing body of football in Libya. It was founded in 1962, affiliated to FIFA in 1964 and to CAF in 1965. It organizes the national football league and the national team.

== Post-revolution status ==
During the 2011 Libyan civil war, the football team continued to play, completing their 2012 African Cup of Nations qualification match against Mozambique behind closed doors on neutral territory in Cairo.
