= DR Congo women's national under-20 football team =

DR Congo Under-20
- Association: Congolese Association Football Federation
- Confederation: CAF (Africa)
- Sub-confederation: UNIFFAC (Central Africa)
- Home stadium: Stade des Martyrs, Kinshasa
- FIFA code: COD
First colours	Second colours

African World Cup qualification
- Appearances: 7 (first in 2004)
- Best result: Champions (2006, 2008)

FIFA U-20 Women's World Cup
- Appearances: 2 (first in 2006)
- Best result: Group stage (2006, 2008)

The DR Congo U-20 women's national football team represents Democratic Republic of the Congo in international women's football for under 20. The team plays its home games in Kinshasa. DR Congo became African champions twice, in 2006 and 2008, and took part in the World Cup in the same two years.

== Competitive record ==
=== FIFA U-20 Women's World Cup record ===
FIFA U-20 Women's World Cup
Year	Result	Matches	Wins	Draws*	Losses	GF	GA
(Canada) 2002	Did not qualify						
(Thailand) 2004	Did not qualify						
(Russia) 2006	Group stage	3	0	0	3	1	7
(Chile) 2008	Group stage	3	0	0	3	1	12
(Germany) 2010	Did not qualify						
(Japan) 2012	Did not qualify						
(Canada) 2014	Did not qualify						
(Papua New Guinea) 2016	Did not qualify						
(France) 2018	Did not qualify						
(Costa Rica) 2022	Did not qualify						
(Colombia) 2024	Did not qualify						
(Poland) 2026	To be determined						
Total	2/12	6	0	0	6	2	19

== Head-to-head record ==
The following table shows DR Congo's head-to-head record in the FIFA U-20 Women's World Cup.

Opponent	Pld	W	D	L	GF	GA	GD	Win %
Argentina	1	0	0	1	0	4	−4	0.00
Canada	1	0	0	1	0	4	−4	0.00
France	1	0	0	1	0	1	−1	0.00
Germany	1	0	0	1	0	5	−5	0.00
Japan	1	0	0	1	1	3	−2	0.00
United States	1	0	0	1	1	2	−1	0.00
Total	6	0	0	6	2	19	−17	0.00

== See also ==
- DR Congo women's national football team
