= UNAF U-17 Women's Tournament =

- Organiser(s): UNAF
- Founded: 2024; 2 years ago
- Region: North Africa
- Teams: 5 (plus guests)
- Current champions: Morocco (1st title)
- Most championships: Tanzania; Morocco (1 title)
- Website: unafonline.org
- 2026 UNAF U-17 Women's Tournament

The UNAF U-17 Women's Tournament is an international women's football tournament organized by the Union of North African Football (UNAF) for its nations consisting of players under the age of 17. However, the tournament invites teams from other nations.

Guests Tanzania and Morocco are the most successful nations winning the tournament one time. The current winners are Morocco.

== Results ==
| Year | Host | First place game | | | Third place game | | |
| Year | Host | (gold) Champion | Score | (silver) Runner-up | (bronze) Third place | Score | Fourth place |
|---|---|---|---|---|---|---|---|
| 2024 | Tunisia | Tanzania | round-robin | Tunisia | Morocco | round-robin | Egypt |
| 2026 | Tunisia | Morocco | round-robin | Tunisia | Botswana | round-robin | Libya |

== Statistics ==
=== Summary ===
| Team | Winners | Runners-up | Third place | Fourth place |
|---|---|---|---|---|
| Morocco | 1 (2026) | — | 1 (2024) | — |
| Tanzania | 1 (2024) | — | — | — |
| Tunisia | — | 2 (2024*, 2026*) | — | — |
| Botswana | — | — | 1 (2026) | |
| Egypt | — | — | — | 1 (2024) |
| Libya | — | — | — | 1 (2026) |

* Hosts
Italic Invited nation

=== Participating nations ===
| Team | (Tunisia) 2024 | (Tunisia) 2026 | Apps. |
|---|---|---|---|
| Egypt | 4th | × | 1 |
| Libya | × | 4th | 1 |
| Morocco | 3rd | 1st | 2 |
| Tunisia | 2nd | 2nd | 2 |
Invited nations
| Botswana | × | 3rd | 1 |
| Tanzania | 1st | × | 1 |

- 1st – Champions
- 2nd – Runners-up
- 3rd – Third place
- 4th – Fourth place
- — Hosts
- × — Did not enter / Withdrew / Banned

== See also ==
- UNAF Women's Tournament
- UNAF U-21 Women's Tournament
- UNAF U-20 Women's Tournament
