= 2023 UNAF U-20 Women's Tournament =

- Official poster of the tournament

Tournament details
- Host country: Tunisia
- City: Le Kram
- Dates: 14–18 March
- Teams: 4 (from 1 sub-confederation)
- Venue: 1 (in 1 host city)

Final positions
- Champions: Morocco (2nd title)
- Runners-up: Algeria
- Third place: Egypt

Tournament statistics
- Matches played: 6
- Goals scored: 18 (3 per match)
- Top scorer(s): (Algeria) Amélia Zemma (3 goals)
- Fair play award: Algeria

the 2023 UNAF U-20 Women's Tournament was the 2nd edition of the UNAF U-20 Women's Tournament, the international women's youth football championship contested by the under-20 national teams of the member associations of UNAF (North Africa), the tournament was originally scheduled to run from 11 to 18 February 2023. However, the tournament was postponed indefinitely due to the inability of the Tunisian Football Federation to host the tournament in that period of time adding to the lack of interest shown by the participating members. The tournament was later rescheduled and to be held from 13 to 20 March 2023 in Sousse, Tunisia.

Morocco are the defending champions having won the inaugural tournament back in 2019.

== Participating nations ==
On 25 December 2022, it was initially announced that all UNAF's member associations will compete in the tournament alongside CECAFA's Sudan (who were scheduled to make their maiden international debut in the tournament). Tanzania were also reported to be invited to the tournament. On 22 February 2023, UNAF confirmed the participation of four teams in the UNAF U-20 Women's Tournament, with Egypt debuting in the tournament.

| Team | App | Last | Best placement in the tournament |
|---|---|---|---|
| Algeria | 2nd | 2019 | Third Place (2019) |
| Egypt | 1st | —N/a | debut |
| Morocco | 2nd | 2019 | Champions (2019) |
| Tunisia | 2nd | 2019 | Fourth Place (2019) |

== Venues ==
Sousse was initially confirmed as the host city on 2 February 2023. however, on 13 March 2023 CAF announced that the tournament would take place in Al-Kram Stadium in Le Kram, Tunis, Tunisia.

| 2023 UNAF U-20 Women's Tournament is located in Tunisia | Le Kram |
|---|---|
| 2023 UNAF U-20 Women's Tournament is located in Tunisia | Al-Kram Stadium |
| 2023 UNAF U-20 Women's Tournament is located in Tunisia | Capacity: 5,000 |

== Squads ==
Players born between 1 January 2003 and 31 December 2007 are eligible to compete in the tournament.

== Match officials ==
On 7 March 2023, UNAF announced a total of 4 referees and 9 assistant referees appointed for the tournament.

Referees

- (Algeria) Ghada Mehat
- (Egypt) Noura Samir
- (Morocco) Amina Fakhr
- (Tunisia) Emna Ajbouni

Assistant referees

- (Algeria) Sarah Belmady
- (Algeria) Marwa Matallah
- (Egypt) Naglaa Fathy
- (Egypt) Nourhan ElSayed
- (Morocco) Fadwa Amish
- (Morocco) Khadija Oriefy
- (Morocco) Khadija Ourd
- (Tunisia) Shefya El-Amry
- (Tunisia) Aya Khadry
- (Tunisia) Safa Abidi

== Main Tournament ==
The match schedule was announced by UNAF on 22 February 2023 without kick-off times.

All times are local, CET (UTC+1)

| Pos | Team | Pld | W | D | L | GF | GA | GD | Pts | Final result |
|---|---|---|---|---|---|---|---|---|---|---|
| 1 | Morocco | 3 | 2 | 1 | 0 | 5 | 1 | +4 | 7 | Champions |
| 2 | Algeria | 3 | 2 | 1 | 0 | 7 | 4 | +3 | 7 | Runners-up |
| 3 | Egypt | 3 | 1 | 0 | 2 | 4 | 4 | 0 | 3 | Third place |
| 4 | Tunisia (H) | 3 | 0 | 0 | 3 | 3 | 10 | −7 | 0 | |

Source: UNAF
Rules for classification: Group stage tiebreakers
(H) Hosts
14 March 2023
11:00

| Tunisia | 1–3 | Egypt |
|---|---|---|
| Boussaida 73' | Report | Ramadan 18' (pen.); Mostafa 45'; Zaher 57' |

Al-Kram Stadium, Tunis
Referee: Ghada Mehat (Algeria)
14 March 2023
14:00

| Morocco | 1–1 | Algeria |
|---|---|---|
| Said 12' | Report | Hammoudi 67' |

Al-Kram Stadium, Tunis
Referee: Emna Ajbouni (Tunisia)

16 March 2023
11:00

| Morocco | 3–0 | Tunisia |
|---|---|---|
| Basser 14'; Cherkane 40+2'; Boussatta 54' | Report | Ben Mohamed (red card) 45' |

Al-Kram Stadium, Tunis
Referee: Noura Samir (Egypt)
16 March 2023
14:00

| Algeria | 2–1 | Egypt |
|---|---|---|
| Zemma 74' (pen.); Sidi Moussa 80' | Report | Mostafa 29' |

Al-Kram Stadium, Tunis
Referee: Amina Fakhr (Morocco)

18 March 2023
12:00

| Egypt | 0–1 | Morocco |
|---|---|---|
| | Report | Nouhaili 80+2' |

Al-Kram Stadium, Tunis
Referee: Emna Ajbouni (Tunisia)
18 March 2023
15:00

| Tunisia | 2–4 | Algeria |
|---|---|---|
| Lamouz 6', 67' | Report | Zemma 7', 23'; Chehoud 26' (o.g.); Baali 57' |

Al-Kram Stadium, Tunis
Referee: Noura Samir (Egypt)

== Goalscorers ==
There were 18 goals scored in 6 matches, for an average of 3 goals per match (as of 18 March 2023).

3 goals

- (Algeria) Amélia Zemma

2 goals

- (Egypt) Hala Mostafa Musa
- (Tunisia) Kamar Lamouz

1 goal

- (Algeria) Thiziri Baali
- (Algeria) Ikram Hammoudi
- (Algeria) Ikram Sidi Moussa
- (Egypt) Layla Sayf Zaher
- (Egypt) Nadia Ahmed Ramadan
- (Morocco) Ambre Basser
- (Morocco) Amal Cherkane
- (Morocco) Dania Boussatta
- (Morocco) Hajar Said
- (Morocco) Nora Nouhaili
- (Tunisia) Ons Boussaida

1 own goal

- (Tunisia) Malek Chehoud (against Algeria)
