= 2006 African U-20 Women's World Cup qualification =

3rd FIFA U-20 Women's World Championship/Cup qualification for African nations

Tournament details
- Dates: 4 March – 11 June 2006
- Teams: 22 (from 1 confederation)

Tournament statistics
- Matches played: 15
- Goals scored: 58 (3.87 per match)

The 2006 African U-20 Women's World Cup qualification was the 3rd edition of the African U-20 Women's World Cup qualification, the biennial international youth football competition organised by the Confederation of African Football (CAF) to determine which women's under-20 national teams from Africa qualify for the FIFA U-20 Women's World Cup. Players born on or after 1 January 1986 were eligible to compete in the tournament.

In 2006, FIFA granted Africa a second qualification spot at the FIFA U-20 Women's World Championship. The Confederation of African Football (CAF) organized qualification matches for its member nations between 4 March and 11 June 2006. At the conclusion of qualification, DR Congo and Nigeria represented Africa at the 2006 FIFA U-20 Women's World Championship in Russia.

== First round ==
Team 1	Agg.	Team 2	1st leg	2nd leg
Zambia	2–5	Mozambique	0–4	2–1
DR Congo	3–1	Benin	2–1	1–0
Liberia	w/o	Guinea	—	—
Kenya	w/o	Congo	—	—
Egypt	w/o	Ethiopia	—	—
Madagascar	w/o	Senegal	—	—
Algeria	bye			
Cameroon	bye			
Equatorial Guinea	bye			
Eritrea	bye			
Ghana	bye			
Mali	bye			
Morocco	bye			
Nigeria	bye			
South Africa	bye			
Zimbabwe	bye			

4 March 2006

Zambia	0–4	Mozambique
		Nadia Simbine 6'; Augusta Massingue 39'; Atalia Mazuze 72'; Aida Camusse 78'

Kitwe
19 March 2006

Mozambique	1–2	Zambia

Mozambique won 5−2 on aggregate and advanced to the second round.

5 March 2006

DR Congo	2–1	Benin
Kiuvu 43' (pen.); Nzuzi 85'		Ayandike 46'

Kinshasa
19 March 2006

Benin	0–1	DR Congo

DR Congo won 3−1 on aggregate and advanced to the second round.

Liberia	w/o	Guinea

Liberia won on walkover after Guinea failed to appear for the first leg.

Kenya	w/o	Congo

Kenya won on walkover after Congo failed to appear for the first leg.

Egypt	w/o	Ethiopia

Egypt won on walkover after Ethiopia failed to appear for the first leg.

Madagascar	w/o	Senegal

Senegal won on walkover after Madagascar failed to appear for the first leg.

== Second round ==
Team 1	Agg.	Team 2	1st leg	2nd leg
South Africa	9–0	Mozambique	6–0	3–0
Nigeria	10–1	Kenya	8–0	2–1
Algeria	2–6	Liberia	2–3	0–3
Mali	1–4	DR Congo	1–1	0–3
Zimbabwe	w/o	Egypt	—	—
Cameroon	w/o	Senegal	—	—
Morocco	w/o	Equatorial Guinea	—	—
Ghana	w/o	Eritrea	—	—

1 April 2006

South Africa	6−0	Mozambique

15 April 2006

Mozambique	0−3	South Africa

South Africa won 9−0 on aggregate and advanced to the third round.

2 April 2006

Nigeria	8–0	Kenya

15 April 2006

Kenya	1−2	Nigeria

Nigeria won 10−1 on aggregate and advanced to the third round.

2 April 2006

Algeria	2–3	Liberia

15 April 2006

Liberia	3–0 (Awarded)	Algeria

Liberia won after Algeria failed to appear for the second leg.

2 April 2006

Mali	1–1	DR Congo

15 April 2006

DR Congo	3–0 (Awarded)	Mali

DR Congo won after Mali failed to appear for the second leg.

2 April 2006

Zimbabwe	w/o	Egypt

Egypt won on walkover after Zimbabwe failed to appear for the first leg.

2 April 2006

Cameroon	w/o	Senegal

Cameroon won on walkover after Senegal failed to appear for the first leg.

2 April 2006

Morocco	w/o	Equatorial Guinea

Equatorial Guinea won on walkover after Morocco failed to appear for the first leg.

2 April 2006

Ghana	w/o	Eritrea

Ghana won on walkover after Eritrea failed to appear for the first leg.

== Third round ==
Team 1	Agg.	Team 2	1st leg	2nd leg
Nigeria	10–2	Liberia	1–1	9–1
South Africa	2–2 (a)	DR Congo	2–1	0–1
Egypt	w/o	Equatorial Guinea	—	—
Cameroon	dq (Note: Both Cameroon and Ghana were ejected from the competition for respectively having players holding forged visas and for fielding two overage players.)	Ghana	4–0	—

29 April 2006

Nigeria	1–1	Liberia

13 May 2006

Liberia	1–9	Nigeria

Nigeria won 10−2 on aggregate and advanced to the fourth round.

29 April 2006

South Africa	2–1	DR Congo

14 May 2006

DR Congo	1–0	South Africa

DR Congo won 2−2 on aggregate via the away goals rule and advanced to the fourth round.

29 April 2006

Egypt	w/o	Equatorial Guinea

Equatorial Guinea won on walkover after Egypt failed to appear for the first leg.

29 April 2006

Cameroon	4–0	Ghana

14 May 2006

Ghana	Not played	Cameroon

Both Cameroon and Ghana were ejected from the competition after the first leg.

== Fourth round ==
First legs were played on 27–28 May and the second legs on 10–11 June 2006. Winners qualify for the 2006 FIFA U-20 Women's World Championship.

Team 1	Agg.	Team 2	1st leg	2nd leg
DR Congo	w/o	Equatorial Guinea	—	—
Nigeria	bye			

27–28 May 2006

DR Congo	w/o	Equatorial Guinea

DR Congo won on walkover and qualified straightaway after Equatorial Guinea failed to appear for the first leg.

Nigeria were drawn to play the winner of Cameroon vs. Ghana, but with both ejected from the competition, Nigeria also qualified straightaway.

== Qualified teams for the 2006 FIFA U-20 Women's World Championship ==
The following teams represented Africa at the 2006 FIFA U-20 Women's World Championship in Russia.

Team	Qualified on	Previous FIFA U-20 Women's; World Championship appearances
DR Congo	10 June 2006	0
Nigeria	11 June 2006	2 (2002, 2004)
