= Morocco women's national under-20 football team =

National association football team

Morocco women's U-20
- Nickname: Atlas Lionesses
- Association: Royal Moroccan Football Federation
- Confederation: CAF (Africa)
- Head coach: Jorge Vilda
- FIFA code: MAR
First colours	Second colours

African U-20 World Cup qualification
- Appearances: 9 (first in 2002)
- Best result: Champions (2024)

FIFA U-20 Women's World Cup
- Appearances: 1 (first in 2024)
- Best result: Group stage (2024)

The Morocco women's national under-20 football team, nicknamed the Atlas Lionesses, represents Morocco in international youth women's football competitions. Its primary role is the development of players in preparation for the senior women's national team. The team competes in a variety of competitions, including the biennial FIFA U-20 Women's World Cup and African U-20 Women's World Cup qualification, which is the top competitions for this age group.

The team has qualified for the 2024 FIFA U-20 Women's World Cup to represent the country for the first time in this competition. The team won the bronze medal in the women's tournament at the 2019 African Games held in Rabat, Morocco.

== History ==
=== Beginnings ===
The under-20 category of the women's national team emerged in the early 2000s, with Morocco's participation in the African qualifying tournament for the 2002 FIFA U-19 Women's World Championship in Canada. The Moroccan team progressed to the qualifying semi-finals following the withdrawals of Gambia and Niger. However, unable to face Nigeria, Morocco was forced to forfeit the match. In 2004, Morocco played its first official matches in the qualification rounds for the 2004 FIFA U-19 Women's World Championship. The team faced Equatorial Guinea in the first round, resulting in a 1-1 draw in the first leg. Morocco was defeated in the second leg by a score of 1-0, thus ending their campaign. Subsequently, the national team remained absent from competitions for nearly eight years.

=== Tunisia the black beast of Morocco (2012-2014) ===
During the qualifications for the 2012 World Cup in Japan, the Moroccan national team, led by Abid Oubenaissa, faced their Tunisian counterparts. Morocco was eliminated in the first round of the competition. Although they secured a 1-0 victory in the second leg in Tunisia on March 2, 2012, their efforts were in vain as the first leg had ended with a decisive 5-0 victory for Tunisia. The match, which took place at the Stade municipal in Kenitra on February 18, 2012, saw Amel Majri, who would later represent the France national team, score a double for Tunisia. The rivalry continued in 2013 when Morocco and Tunisia met again in the first round of qualifying for the 2014 World Cup in Canada. This time, Tunisia emerged victorious in both legs. They secured a 4-0 win in Morocco during the first leg on October 26, 2013, and followed it up with a 4-1 victory in Tunisia on November 8, 2013.

=== Morocco suffers the law of Nigeria (2017) ===
The national team actively participated in the qualifying matches for the 2018 World Cup in France. Having been exempted from the preliminary round, Morocco, featuring talented players such as Fatima Tagnaout and Sanaâ Mssoudy, faced Senegal in the first round. Despite a 2-1 loss in the second leg held in Dakar on September 30, 2017, the Moroccans capitalized on their 2-0 victory in the first leg in Salé on September 16, 2017, thanks to goals from Rania Salmi and Sanaâ Mssoudy. In the second round, Morocco encountered Nigeria. The first leg took place in Salé on November 5, 2022, resulting in a draw. Nouhaila Sedki scored the Moroccan goal during the match.

=== Encouraging results (2019) ===
During the summer of 2019, Morocco was chosen to host the 2019 African Games. Under the guidance of Lamia Boumehdi, the national team achieved success in the group stage by winning all three matches. On August 17, 2019, they secured a 3-2 victory against Algeria, followed by a 2-0 win against Equatorial Guinea and a 4-1 triumph against Mali. In the semi-finals, Morocco faced Cameroon and suffered a 3-1 defeat, which ended their pursuit of the gold medal. However, in the third-place match against Algeria in Sala on August 28, 2019, the team rallied and emerged victorious, earning the bronze medal. Fatima Ezzahra Akif and her teammates showcased their skills and determination throughout the tournament. Later in October 2019, Morocco participated in the UNAF U-20 Women's Tournament held in Tangier. Zineb Redouani and her teammates performed exceptionally well, winning all three matches. They secured a 2-1 victory against Burkina Faso, a 3-1 win against Algeria, and a 2-0 triumph against Tunisia, ultimately clinching the tournament trophy.

=== Morocco and the covid-19 pandemic ===
Under the leadership of Lamia Boumehdi, the Moroccan team actively participated in the qualifying matches for the 2020 World Cup in Costa Rica. They began their campaign with a double confrontation against Egypt. In an impressive display of skill and determination, Morocco emerged victorious in both legs, securing a 5-3 win in Cairo on January 17, 2020, and a 3-1 victory in Salé on February 2, 2020. The team was set to face their Algerian counterparts in the next round. However, due to the global spread of the COVID-19 pandemic, FIFA made the decision to cancel the competition. Consequently, the World Cup was postponed for a year, and the teams had to wait for the rescheduled qualifiers to continue their journey.

=== Defeat on the edge of the Atlas Lioncelles (2022) ===
After being exempted from the first round, Morocco commenced their preparations for the 2022 FIFA U-20 Women's World Cup by facing Benin. Although the second leg in Rabat on October 9, 2021, ended in a draw, Morocco secured their qualification with a 2-1 victory in Porto-Novo on September 25, 2021, courtesy of goals from Sofia Bouftini and Nassima Jawad. The first leg of the match had to be played over two days due to heavy rain, with the game being interrupted in the 42nd minute and resumed the following day. In the third round, Morocco faced Gambia. Since Gambia couldn't host, both legs were played at the Stade Moulay Hassan in Rabat. Morocco emerged victorious in both matches, defeating Gambia 3-1 on December 6, 2021, and 6-0 on December 12, 2021, with Sofia Bouftini scoring a hat-trick. Marwa Hassani and her teammates then faced Senegal in the decisive round. Both legs ended in draws, with a 1-1 scoreline in the first leg in Rabat on January 22, 2022, with Sofia Bouftini finding the back of the net, and the same result in the second leg on February 5, 2022, in Thiès, with Morocco's goal being scored by captain Nesryne El Chad. The penalty shootout favored Senegal, who won 5-4, thus ending Morocco's journey in the qualifiers.

=== The First Qualification for the World Cup ===
After failing to qualify for the 2022 FIFA U-20 Women's World Cup, the Moroccan national team regrouped in November 2022 for a training camp held at the Mohammed VI Football Academy in Salé from November 9 to 15. In February 2023, the team traveled to Conakry to face Guinea in a double friendly match at the Stade du 28 Septembre. In the first leg on February 16, 2023, Morocco emerged victorious with a 3-0 scoreline, thanks to goals from Doha El Madani (double) and Yasmine Zouhir. However, the second match on February 19, 2023, ended in a 3-2 victory for Guinea, with Moroccan goals scored by Dania Boussatta and Yasmine Zouhir once again. From March 13 to 18, 2023, Morocco participated in the second edition of the 2023 UNAF U-20 Women's Tournament held in Tunisia. The team faced Algeria, Tunisia, and Egypt. Morocco drew 1-1 against Algeria and secured a last-minute 1-0 victory against Egypt, with a goal from Nora Nouhaili. By finishing first with 7 points on overall goal difference ahead of Algeria, Morocco won the tournament. To prepare for the qualifications for the 2024 FIFA U-20 Women's World Cup, the team played two friendly matches in Thiès on May 17 and 20, 2023. Both matches ended in defeat for Morocco, with scores of 2-0 and 2-1 respectively. The only Moroccan goal in the second match was scored by Fatima El Ghazouani.

In August 2023, the team faced Mali at the Mohammed VI Complex in a friendly double confrontation. This marks the first stage under the guidance of Stephane Nado. Anthony Rimasson transitions from head coach to assistant. Morocco wins the first leg 1-0 with a goal from Sofia Boussate. The second leg sees both teams drawing (3-3) with Moroccan goals from Dounia F'Touh (brace) and Marjane Benmansour. A few days later, a squad composed only of local players travels to Alexandria to face Egypt in a friendly double confrontation on September 6 and 9. Morocco suffers two defeats: 3-1 with a goal from Douae Azizi and then 1-0. In September, the team faced Botswana in two friendly matches to prepare for the qualifications for the 2024 FIFA U-20 Women's World Cup. The first match ended in a decisive victory for Morocco (6-0). Morocco also triumphed in the second match, this time with a score of 8-0 (the largest victory in the history of the team).

Morocco began the 2024 African U-20 Women's World Cup qualification on October 8th 2023 with a 4-0 victory over Burkina Faso, thanks to goals from Yasmine Zouhir, Sofia Boussate, Mina El Hamzaoui, and Dania Boussatta. The second leg ended in a 1-1 draw (Moroccan goal by Zina Catherine-Elasri). In late October, the team faced Benin in a friendly double confrontation at the Mohammed VI Complex. Morocco wins the first leg on 26/10/2023 with a score of 2-1, thanks to goals from Ambre Basser-Drunet and Doha El Madani. The Moroccans also prevail in the second leg, this time with a score of 4-2. The Moroccan goals are scored by Nehla Sadiki, Wissal El Assaoui, and Nouhaïla El Montaser (the fourth goal was an own goal).

The following month in El Jadida, the team plays the penultimate round of the qualifications for the 2024 World Cup against Guinea. Morocco wins both legs, the first on November 12th with a score of 3-0 thanks to a hat-trick from Doha El Madani, and the second leg on November 18th with a score of 2-0, featuring goals from Nehla Sadiki and Samya Masnaoui. Then comes the fourth round of the qualifiers, where the team faced Ethiopia. After a 2-0 victory in the first leg on January 13th, 2024 in El Jadida (goals by Yasmine Zouhir and Ambre Basser), Morocco qualifies for the FIFA U-20 Women's World Cup for the first time in the team's history, despite losing (1-0) in the second leg in Addis Ababa.

== Fixtures and results ==
Legend Win Draw Lose Fixture

== Current squad ==
The following players were named for the 2024 FIFA U-20 Women's World Cup.

No.	Pos.	Player	Date of birth (age)	Caps	Goals	Club
1	GK	Inès Souifi	17 August 2004 (aged 20)			(French Football Federation) Colomiers
2	DF	Fatima Zahra Naini	20 September 2006 (aged 17)			(Royal Moroccan Football Federation) Hilal Témara
3	FW	Djennah Cherif	10 January 2006 (aged 18)			(French Football Federation) Thonon Evian
4	DF	Ikram Neddar	11 April 2004 (aged 20)			(Italian Football Federation) Frosinone
5	DF	Fatima El Ghazouani	11 May 2005 (aged 19)			(French Football Federation) Lens
6	DF	Dania Boussatta	16 February 2005 (aged 19)			Unattached
7	FW	Doha El Madani	20 October 2005 (aged 18)			(Royal Moroccan Football Federation) AS FAR
8	MF	Samya Masnaoui	16 September 2005 (aged 18)			Unattached
9	FW	Yasmine Zouhir	16 July 2005 (aged 19)			(Royal Spanish Football Federation) Real Betis
10	MF	Dounia Ftouh	23 August 2004 (aged 20)			(Royal Moroccan Football Federation) AS FAR
11	MF	Sofia Boussate	20 April 2006 (aged 18)			(French Football Federation) Montpellier
12	GK	Fatima Zahra El Jebraoui	8 August 2007 (aged 17)			(Royal Moroccan Football Federation) Wydad AC
13	DF	Siham Bouhouch	22 October 2007 (aged 16)			(French Football Federation) Strasbourg
14	DF	Maissen Bourhrine	16 October 2004 (aged 19)			(French Football Federation) Lyon
15	MF	Lina Laetitia Farida Aich	27 January 2006 (aged 18)			(French Football Federation) Reims
16	GK	Anissa Rouinba	23 December 2004 (aged 19)			(German Football Association) 1. FC Köln
17	MF	Kawtar Ait Omar	19 February 2004 (aged 20)			(Royal Belgian Football Association) Genk
18	FW	Romaissa Boukakar	24 December 2005 (aged 18)			(Royal Dutch Football Association) AZ
19	FW	Kautar Azraf	3 January 2008 (aged 16)			(Royal Spanish Football Federation) Barcelona
20	DF	Hajar Jbilou	30 August 2004 (aged 20)			(Royal Moroccan Football Federation) AS FAR
21	DF	Hajar Said	22 May 2005 (aged 19)			(French Football Federation) Bordeaux

== Competitive record ==
=== FIFA U-20 Women's World Cup record ===
FIFA U-20 Women's World Cup
Year	Round	Pld	W	D	L	GF	GA
(Canada) 2002	did not qualify						
(Thailand) 2004	did not qualify						
(Russia) 2006	did not qualify						
(Chile) 2008	did not qualify						
(Germany) 2010	did not qualify						
(Japan) 2012	did not qualify						
(Canada) 2014	did not qualify						
(Papua New Guinea) 2016	did not qualify						
(France) 2018	did not qualify						
(Costa Rica) 2022	did not qualify						
(Colombia) 2024	Group stage	3	0	0	3	0	6
(Poland) 2026	did not qualify						
Total	1/12	3	0	0	3	0	6

=== African U-20 Women's World Cup Qualification record ===
African U-20 Women's World Cup qualification
Appearances: 8
Year	Round	Position	Pld	W	D	L	GF	GA
2002	Semifinals	4th	6	4	0	2	0	0
2004	Round 1	5th	2	0	1	1	1	2
2006	Round 2	16th	2	0	0	2	0	0
2008	Did not enter							
2010	Did not enter							
2012	Round 1	1st	2	0	0	2	0	6
2014	Round 1	16th	2	0	0	2	1	8
2015	Did not enter							
2018	Round 2	8th	4	1	1	2	5	8
2022	Round 4	8th	6	3	3	0	15	6
2024	Qualified for World Cup	1st	6	4	1	1	12	2
2026	Round 1	16th	2	0	1	1	4	6
Total	9/12	1 Title	32	12	7	13	38	38

=== African Games ===
African Games record
Year	Round	Pld	W	D	L	GF	GA
(Morocco) 2019	Bronze Medal	5	4	0	1	12	7
(Ghana) 2023	Group stage	2	0	0	2	0	6
Total	2/2	7	4	0	3	12	13

=== UNAF U-20 Women's Tournament record ===
UNAF U-20 Women's Tournament
Year	Round	Position	Pld	W	D	L	GF	GA
(Morocco) 2019	Champions	1st	3	3	0	0	7	4
(Tunisia) 2023	Champions	1st	3	2	1	0	5	1
(Tunisia) 2025	Champions	1st	3	3	0	0	9	1
Total	3 Titles	3/3	9	8	1	0	21	6

== Head-to-head record ==
The following table shows Morocco's head-to-head record in the FIFA U-20 Women's World Cup.

Opponent	Pld	W	D	L	GF	GA	GD	Win %
Paraguay	1	0	0	1	0	2	−2	0.00
Spain	1	0	0	1	0	2	−2	0.00
United States	1	0	0	1	0	2	−2	0.00
Total	3	0	0	3	0	6	−6	0.00

== Honours ==
- UNAF U-20 Women's Tournament

(gold) Winner (3): 2019, 2023, 2025

- African Games

(bronze) Bronze Medal: 2019

== See also ==
- Morocco women's national football team
- Morocco women's national under-17 football team
