= Egypt women's national under-20 football team =

Egypt Women's U-20s
- Nickname: The Young Cleopatras
- Association: Egyptian Football Association
- Confederation: CAF (Africa)
- Sub-confederation: UNAF (North Africa)
- FIFA code: EGY
First colours	Second colours

African U-20 World Cup qualification
- Appearances: 6 (first in 2006)
- Best result: Round 4 (2024)

FIFA U-20 Women's World Cup
- Appearances: None

The Egypt women's national under-20 football team represents Egypt in international youth women's football competitions.

== Competitive record ==
Champions Runners-up Third place Fourth place

- Red border color indicates tournament was held on home soil.

=== FIFA U-20 Women's World Cup ===
FIFA U-20 Women's World Cup
Year	Result	Position	Pld	W	D	L	GF	GA
(Canada) 2002	Did not qualify							
(Thailand) 2004	Did not qualify							
(Russia) 2006	Did not qualify							
(Chile) 2008	Did not qualify							
(Germany) 2010	Did not qualify							
(Japan) 2012	Did not qualify							
(Canada) 2014	Did not qualify							
(Papua New Guinea) 2016	Did not qualify							
(France) 2018	Did not qualify							
(Costa Rica) 2020	Canceled							
(Costa Rica) 2022	Did not qualify							
(Colombia) 2024	Did not qualify							
(Poland) 2026	To be determined							
Total		0/12						

=== African U-20 Women's World Cup qualification ===
African U-20 Women's World Cup qualification
Appearances: 7
Year	Round	Pld	W	D	L	GF	GA
2002	Did not enter						
2004	Did not enter						
2006	Round 2	0	0	0	0	-	-
2008	Round 2	2	0	1	1	3	3
2010	Withdrawn						
2012	Did not enter						
2014	Withdrawn						
2015	Did not enter						
2018	Did not enter						
2020	Cancelled						
2022	Round 3	4	2	1	1	9	3
2024	Round 4	6	3	2	1	28	6
2026	To be determined						
Total	4/12	12	5	4	3	40	12

=== UNAF U-20 Women's Tournament ===
UNAF U-20 Women's Tournament
Year	Round	Position	Pld	W	D	L	GF	GA
(Morocco) 2019	Withdrew							
(Tunisia) 2023	Third-place	3rd	3	1	0	2	4	4
(Tunisia) 2025	To be determined							
Total	2 Titles	3/3	3	1	0	2	4	4

== See also ==
- Egypt women's national football team
- Egypt women's national under-17 football team
