= Boubker Ammar Stadium =

Football stadium in Morocco

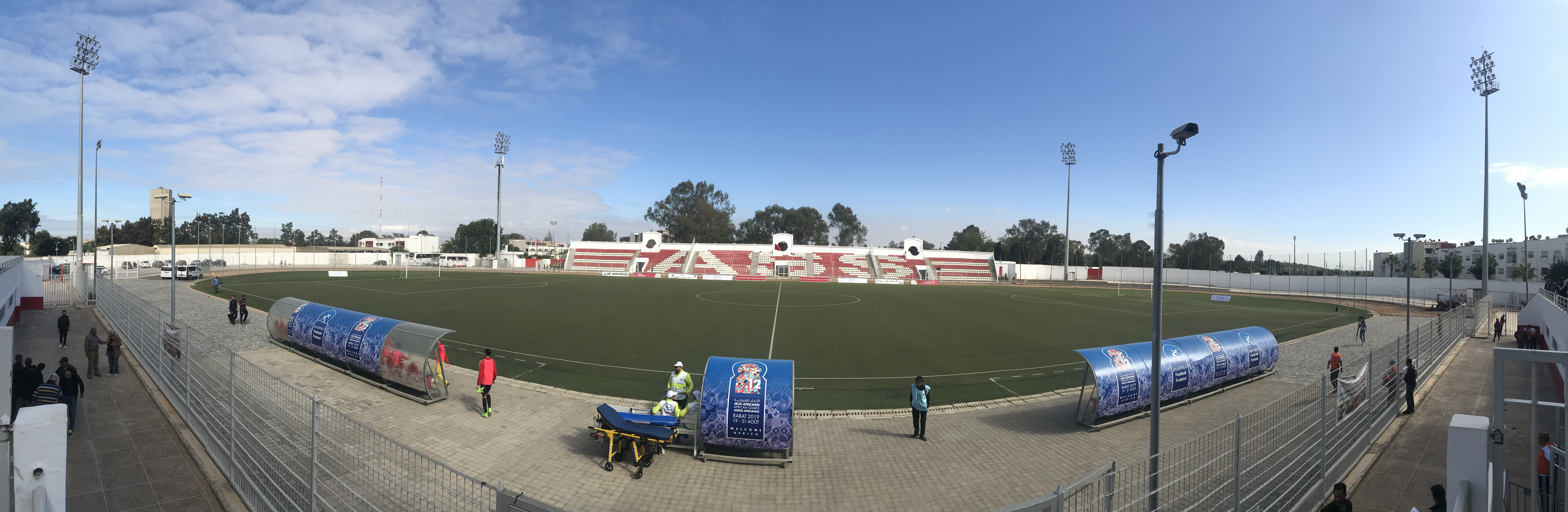
- Interactive map of Boubker Ammar Stadium
- Location: Salé, Morocco
- Coordinates: 34.0331°N 6.7972°W
- Owner: AS Salé
- Operator: AS Salé
- Capacity: 5,000

Tenants
- AS Salé; Kénitra AC (2026–) (temporary)

Boubker Ammar Stadium is a football stadium in Salé, Morocco. It is the home stadium of AS Salé. The stadium holds 5,000 spectators.
