= UNAF Women's Tournament =

- Organiser(s): UNAF
- Founded: 2009; 17 years ago
- Region: North Africa
- Teams: 5 (plus guests)
- Current champions: Morocco (1st title)
- Most championships: Morocco; Tunisia (1 title each)
- Website: unafonline.org

The UNAF Women's Tournament is an international women's football tournament organized by the Union of North African Football (UNAF) However, the tournament invites teams from other nations. Morocco and Tunisia were the most successful countries in the competition, each winning one title.

== History ==
The first edition was played in 2009 in Tunisia, with three teams participating: Algeria, Egypt and Tunisia. Tunisia won the title after topping the standings, with Algeria finishing second and Egypt third. After an 11-year hiatus, the tournament was held again in 2020 in Tunisia, with the participation of five teams: Algeria, Morocco, Tunisia, and Mauritania and Tanzania, who were invited to participate. Morocco won the title after topping the standings, with Tanzania taking second place, Tunisia third, Algeria fourth, and Mauritania fifth. The third edition was scheduled to be played in Egypt in 2023, but it was cancelled due to a decrease in the number of participating countries and a lack of interest among member federations.

== Results ==
Ed.	Year	Host	First place game			Third place game		
Ed.	Year	Host	(gold) Champion	Score	(silver) Runner-up	(bronze) Third place	Score	Fourth place
1	2009	Tunisia	Tunisia	round-robin	Algeria	Egypt		
2	2020	Tunisia	Morocco	round-robin	Tanzania	Tunisia	round-robin	Algeria
—	2023	Egypt	Cancelled			Cancelled		

== Statistics ==
=== Summary ===
Team	Winners	Runners-up	Third place	Fourth place
Tunisia	1 (2009*)	—	1 (2020*)	—
Morocco	1 (2020)	—	—	—
Algeria	—	1 (2009)	—	1 (2020)
Tanzania	—	1 (2020)	—	—
Egypt	—	—	1 (2009)	—

* Hosts
Italic Invited nation

=== Participating nations ===
Team	(Tunisia) 2009	(Tunisia) 2020	(Egypt) ~~2023~~	Apps.
Algeria	2nd	4th	~~Q~~	2
Egypt	3rd	×	~~Q~~	1
Libya	×	×	×	0
Morocco	×	1st	×	1
Tunisia	1st	3rd	×	2
Invited nations
Mauritania		5th		1
Tanzania		2nd		1

- 1st – Champions
- 2nd – Runners-up
- 3rd – Third place
- 4th – Fourth place
- 5th – Fifth place
- Q – Qualified for upcoming tournament
- × — Did not enter / Withdrew / Disqualified
- — Hosts

== See also ==
- UNAF U-21 Women's Tournament
- UNAF U-20 Women's Tournament
- UNAF U-17 Women's Tournament
