= Hany Abo Rida =

President of Egyptian Football Association

Hany Abu Rida
- هاني أبو ريدة

President of the Egyptian Football Association
- In office 2016–2019

President of the Egyptian Football Association
- Incumbent
- Assumed office 2024

Personal details
- Born: 14 August 1953 (age 73) Port Said, Egypt
- Occupation: Engineer
- Known for: Member of the FIFA Council

Hany Hassan Abou Rida (Egyptian Arabic: هاني أبو ريدة; born 14 August 1953) is the president of Egyptian Football Association since 2024, marking his second term after previously holding the position from 2016 to 2019. He is also a member of the FIFA Council (since 2009), and a member of CAF Executive Committee.

== Biography ==
Hany Abo Rida was born on 14 August 1953 in Port Said, Egypt. At a young age he began to play football with Elmasry Club, but he had a serious injury which led him to leave the football ground. He studied Engineering, and has been running his own business since 1979. In 1991, he became a member of Egyptian Football Association (EFA) Board. In 2004, he started his career in FIFA. He later became the president of Egyptian Football Association in 2016. He was pressured by the public to resign from his presidential position at the EFA, after Egypt’s AFCON 2019 loss against South Africa, which he did on July 6, 2019. In late 2024, he was re-elected for a second four-year term as president of the Egyptian Football Association.

== Professional career ==
- Board Member - Egyptian Football Association 1989–2019
- President - Egyptian Football Association 2016–2019, 2024–present
- LOC Vice President – 1997 FIFA U-17 World Championship
- LOC President – 2009 FIFA U-20 World Cup
- LOC President – CAN 2006
- CAF President – 2011 CAF U-23 Championship
- FIFA Council member - since May 2017

== See also ==
- FIFA Council
- Egyptian Football Association
- CAF
