= Tunisia women's national under-20 football team =

Tunisia women's U-20
- Nickname(s): نسور قرطاج (Eagles of Carthage)
- Association: Tunisian Football Federation
- Other affiliation: UAFA (Arab World)
- Confederation: CAF (Africa)
- Sub-confederation: UNAF (North Africa)
- Home stadium: Hammadi Agrebi Stadium
- FIFA code: TUN
First colours	Second colours	Third colours

UNAF U-20 Women's Tournament
- Appearances: 3 (first in 2019)
- Best result: Third place (2025)

The Tunisia women's national under-20 football team has represented Tunisia in women's international association football for players aged 20 or under. The team is administered by the Tunisian Football Federation (TFF), which governs football in Tunisia. On a continental level, the team competes under the Confederation of African Football (CAF), which governs associate football in Africa, and is also affiliated with FIFA for global competitions. Additionally, the team is a member of the Union of North African Football (UNAF) and the Union of Arab Football Associations (UAFA). The team is colloquially known as Eagles of Carthage by fans and the media, with the bald eagle serving as its symbol. Their home kit is primarily white and their away kit is red, which is a reference to the national flag of the country.

The team participated three times in the UNAF U-20 Women's Tournament in 2019, 2023 and 2025, achieving third place in the last participation.

== Competitive Records ==
Champions Runners-up Third place Fourth place

- Red border color indicates tournament was held on home soil.

=== FIFA U-20 Women's World Cup ===
FIFA U-20 Women's World Cup record									African U-20 Women's World Cup qualification record					
Year	Round	Position	Pld	W	D*	L	GF	GA	Pld	W	D*	L	GF	GA
(Canada) 2002	Did not enter								Did not enter					
(Thailand) 2004	Did not enter								Did not enter					
(Russia) 2006	Did not enter								Did not enter					
(Chile) 2008	Did not enter								Did not enter					
(Germany) 2010	Did not qualify								4	2	0	2	6	3
(Japan) 2012	Did not qualify								6	4	0	2	12	9
(Canada) 2014	Did not qualify								4	2	0	2	4	9
(Papua New Guinea) 2016	Did not enter								Did not enter					
(France) 2018	Did not qualify								2	0	0	2	0	4
(Costa Rica) 2022	Withdrew								Withdrew					
(Colombia) 2024	Did not enter								Did not enter					
(Poland) 2026	Did not qualify								4	1	1	2	2	5
Total	–	0/11	–	–	–	–	–	–	20	9	0	10	24	30

=== African Games ===
African Games record
Year	Round	Position	Pld	W	D*	L	GF	GA
2003 – 2015	See Tunisia women's national football team							
(Morocco) 2019	Did not enter							
(Ghana) 2023	Did not enter							
Total	–	0/2	–	–	–	–	–	–

=== UNAF U-20 Women's Tournament ===
UNAF U-20 Women's Tournament record
Year	Round	Position	Pld	W	D*	L	GF	GA
(Morocco) 2019	Fourth place	4th	3	0	0	3	0	12
(Tunisia) 2023	Fourth place	4th	3	0	0	3	3	10
(Tunisia) 2025	Third place	3rd	3	2	0	1	14	2
Total	Third place	3/3	9	2	0	7	17	24

== Honours ==
UNAF U-20 Women's Tournament

- (bronze) Third place (1): 2025

== See also ==
- Tunisia women's national football team
- Tunisia women's national under-17 football team
