= Equatorial Guinea women's national under-20 football team =

Equatorial Guinea Under-20
- Nickname(s): Nzalang Nacional (National Thunder); Los Elefantes (The Elephants)
- Association: Federación Ecuatoguineana de Fútbol
- Sub-confederation: UNIFFAC (Central Africa)
- FIFA code: EQG
First colours	Second colours

African U-20 World Cup qualification
- Appearances: 8 (first in 2002)
- Best result: Semifinals (2004)

FIFA U-20 Women's World Cup
- Appearances: None

The Equatorial Guinea women's national under-20 football team represents Equatorial Guinea in international youth women's football competitions.

The team competed in the women's tournament at the 2019 African Games held in Rabat, Morocco.

== Competitive record ==
=== FIFA U-20 Women's World Cup record ===
FIFA U-20 Women's World Cup
Year	Result	Matches	Wins	Draws*	Losses	GF	GA
(Canada) 2002	Did not qualify						
(Thailand) 2004	Did not qualify						
(Russia) 2006	Did not qualify						
(Chile) 2008	Did not qualify						
(Germany) 2010	Did not qualify						
(Japan) 2012	Did not qualify						
(Canada) 2014	Did not qualify						
(Papua New Guinea) 2016	Did not qualify						
(France) 2018	Did not qualify						
(Costa Rica) 2022	Did not qualify						
(Colombia) 2024	Did not qualify						
(Poland) 2026	Did not qualify						
Total	0/12	0	0	0	0	0	0

== See also ==
- Equatorial Guinea women's national football team
