= Football at the 2019 African Games – Women's tournament =

2019 African Games women's football tournament
Tournament details
- Host country: Morocco
- Dates: 17–29 August 2019
- Teams: 8 (from 1 confederation)
- Venues: 2 (in 2 host cities)

Final positions
- Champions: Nigeria (3rd title)
- Runners-up: Cameroon
- Third place: Morocco
- Fourth place: Algeria

The 2019 African Games women's football tournament was the 5th edition of the African Games women's football tournament. The women's football tournament was held as part of the 2019 African Games between 17–29 August 2019. Under-20 national teams took part in the tournament. Nigeria defeated Cameroon in the final on penalties to win the tournament. Morocco defeated Algeria to win the bronze medal.

Zambia had to withdraw from the competition due to issues with visa letters.

== Teams ==
CAF selected representative teams from nations that had participated in the 2018 Africa Women Cup of Nations.

- Morocco (hosts)
- Algeria
- Cameroon
- Equatorial Guinea
- Mali
- Nigeria
- South Africa
- Zambia

== Group stage ==
=== Group A ===
Pos	Team	Pld	W	D	L	GF	GA	GD	Pts	Qualification
1	Morocco (H)	3	3	0	0	9	3	+6	9	Advance to semi-final
2	Algeria	3	2	0	1	4	3	+1	6	Advance to semi-final
3	Equatorial Guinea	2	0	0	2	0	3	−3	0	
4	Mali	2	0	0	2	1	5	−4	0	

First match(es) will be played: unknown. Source:
(H) Hosts
17 August 2019
17:00

Morocco	3–2	Algeria
Mouadni 29', 59'; Stiten 84'		Bensenouci 49'; Bekhti 52'

Stade Boubker Ammar, Salé
17 August 2019

Mali	Cancelled	Equatorial Guinea

Stade Boubker Ammar, Salé
20 August 2019
17:00

Algeria	1–0	Mali
Daoui 8'

Stade Boubker Ammar, Salé
20 August 2019
20:00

Equatorial Guinea	0–2	Morocco
		Stiten 60'; Mouadni 61'

Stade Boubker Ammar, Salé
23 August 2019
16:30

Algeria	1–0	Equatorial Guinea

Stade de l'Académie Mohammed VI, Salé
23 August 2019
16:30

Morocco	4–1	Mali

Stade Boubker Ammar, Salé

=== Group B ===
Pos	Team	Pld	W	D	L	GF	GA	GD	Pts	Qualification
1	Nigeria	2	1	1	0	4	1	+3	4	Advance to semi-final
2	Cameroon	2	1	1	0	2	1	+1	4	Advance to semi-final
3	South Africa	2	0	0	2	0	4	−4	0	
4	Zambia	0	0	0	0	0	0	0	0	Withrew

First match(es) will be played: unknown. Source:
18 August 2019
17:00

Cameroon	Cancelled	Zambia

Stade de l'Académie Mohammed VI, Salé
18 August 2019
20:00

South Africa	0–3	Nigeria
		Monday 4'; Olapade 40'; Aku 65'

Stade des Chênes, Salé
21 August 2019

Zambia	Cancelled	South Africa

Stade de l'Académie Mohammed VI, Salé
21 August 2019
20:00

Nigeria	1–1	Cameroon

Stade de l'Académie Mohammed VI, Salé
24 August 2019
19:00

Cameroon	1–0	South Africa

Stade de l'Académie Mohammed VI, Salé
24 August 2019
19:00

Zambia	Cancelled	Nigeria

Stade Boubker Ammar, Salé

== Knockout stage ==
=== Semi-finals ===
26 August 2019
17:00

Nigeria	3–0	Algeria

Stade Boubker Ammar, Salé

26 August 2019
20:00

Morocco	1–3	Cameroon

Stade Boubker Ammar, Salé

=== Third-place playoff ===
28 August 2019
17:30

Morocco	2–1	Algeria
	Report

Stade des Chênes, Salé
Referee: Chancelle Ngakosso (Congo)

=== Final ===
29 August 2019
17:00

Nigeria	0–0 (a.e.t.)	Cameroon
Penalties
	3–2

Stade Boubker Ammar, Salé
