= 2004 African U-19 Women's Championship =

Tournament details
- Dates: 23 May – 19 September 2004
- Teams: 7 (from 1 confederation)

Final positions
- Champions: Nigeria (2nd title)
- Runners-up: South Africa
- Third place: DR Congo; Equatorial Guinea

Tournament statistics
- Matches played: 3
- Goals scored: 11 (3.67 per match)

The 2004 African U-19 Women's Championship was the second edition of the African under-19 women's football championship. The winners of the tournament Nigeria have qualified to the 2004 FIFA U-20 Women's World Cup.

== First round ==
Team 1	Agg.	Team 2	1st leg	2nd leg
Morocco	1–2	Equatorial Guinea	1–1	0–1
Madagascar	w/o	South Africa	—	—
DR Congo	w/o	Mozambique	—	—
Nigeria	bye			

23 May 2004

Morocco	1−1	Equatorial Guinea
Sanaa Griba 61'	Report	5' Christina Aguilera

4−6 June 2004

Equatorial Guinea	1−0	Morocco
A. G. Carmen 6'

Equatorial Guinea won 2−1 on aggregate and advanced to the Semifinals.

Madagascar	Cancelled	South Africa

South Africa won on walkover after Madagascar did not appear for the first leg and advanced to the Semifinals.

DR Congo	Cancelled	Mozambique

DR Congo won on walkover after Mozambique did not appear for the first leg and advanced to the Semifinals.

== Semifinals ==
Team 1	Agg.	Team 2	1st leg	2nd leg
Nigeria	7–0	Equatorial Guinea	3–0	4–0
South Africa	w/o	DR Congo	—	—

27 June 2004

Nigeria	3−0	Equatorial Guinea
Goal

18 July 2004

Equatorial Guinea	0−4	Nigeria
		I. Akudo 40', 66'; O. Okweme 42'; O. Rosemary 84'

Nigeria won 7−0 on aggregate and advanced to the final.

South Africa	Cancelled	DR Congo

South Africa won on walkover after DR Congo did not appear for the first leg and advanced to the final.

== Final ==
Team 1	Agg.	Team 2	1st leg	2nd leg
South Africa	0–1	Nigeria	0–1	0–0

1 August 2004

South Africa	0−1	Nigeria
		I. Akudo 34'

19 September 2004

Nigeria	0−0	South Africa

Nigeria won 1−0 on aggregate and became the champion.

== Qualified teams for FIFA U-20 Women's World Cup ==
The following team from CAF qualified for the 2004 FIFA U-20 Women's World Cup.

Team	Qualified on	Previous appearances in FIFA U-20 Women's World Cup^{1}
Nigeria	19 September 2004	1 (2002)

^{1} Bold indicates champions for that year. Italic indicates hosts for that year.
