= UNAF U-20 Women's Tournament =

- Organiser(s): UNAF
- Founded: 2019; 7 years ago
- Region: North Africa
- Teams: 5 (plus guests)
- Current champions: Morocco (3nd title)
- Most championships: Morocco (3 titles)
- Website: unafonline.org
- 2025 UNAF U-20 Women's Tournament

The UNAF U-20 Women's Tournament is an international women's football tournament organized by the Union of North African Football (UNAF) for its nations consisting of players under the age of 20. However, the tournament invites teams from other nations. Morocco are the most successful nation winning the tournament three times.

== Results ==
Ed.	Year	Host	First place game			Third place game		
Ed.	Year	Host	(gold) Champion	Score	(silver) Runner-up	(bronze) Third place	Score	Fourth place
1	2019	Morocco	Morocco	round-robin	Burkina Faso	Algeria	round-robin	Tunisia
2	2023	Tunisia	Morocco	round-robin	Algeria	Egypt	round-robin	Tunisia
3	2025	Tunisia	Morocco	round-robin	Egypt	Tunisia	round-robin	Algeria

== Statistics ==
=== Summary ===
Team	Winners	Runners-up	Third place	Fourth place
Morocco	3 (2019*, 2023, 2025)	—	—	—
Algeria	—	1 (2023)	1 (2019)	1 (2025)
Egypt	—	1 (2025)	1 (2023)	—
Tunisia	—	—	1 (2025)	2 (2019, 2023*)
Burkina Faso	—	1 (2019)	—	—

* Hosts
Italic Invited nation

=== Participating nations ===
Team	(Morocco) 2019	(Tunisia) 2023	(Tunisia) 2025	Apps.
Algeria	3rd	2nd	4th	3
Egypt	×	3rd	2nd	2
Libya	×	×	6th	1
Morocco	1st	1st	1st	3
Tunisia	4th	4th	3rd	3
Invited nations
Burkina Faso	2nd			1
Jordan			5th	1

- 1st – Champions
- 2nd – Runners-up
- 3rd – Third place
- 4th – Fourth place
- 5th – Fifth place
- 6th – Sixth place
- Q – Qualified for upcoming tournament
- × — Did not enter / Withdrew / Disqualified
- — Hosts

== See also ==
- UNAF Women's Tournament
- UNAF U-21 Women's Tournament
- UNAF U-17 Women's Tournament
