= Egyptian Football Association =

Governing body of association football in Egypt

CAF
- Short name: EFA
- Founded: 3 December 1921; 104 years ago
- Headquarters: Cairo
- FIFA affiliation: 1923
- CAF affiliation: 1957
- UNAF affiliation: 2005
- President: Hany Abo Rida
- Website: www.efa.com.eg

The Egyptian Football Association (Egyptian Arabic: الاتحاد المصري لكرة القدم) is the governing body of association football in Egypt. Founded in 1921, it became a member of FIFA since 1923 and a founding member of the CAF, the EFA has jurisdiction over the Egyptian football league system and is responsible for the men's and women's national teams.

The EFA headquarters is located in Gezira, Cairo. The EFA organizes the semi-professional Egyptian Second Division as well as the lower regional leagues at the third and fourth levels of the league system.

== History ==
Modern football was introduced to Egypt in 1882. Egyptian youth moved from spectators to become players themselves in the streets of Cairo, Alexandria, and the Suez Canal cities where the occupation forces were stationed.

A few years later, football became a popular pastime, and players began forming teams in every neighborhood. These neighborhood teams then competed against each other. The year 1895 marked a significant event in football history when Cairo's football fields witnessed the emergence of the first Egypt national football team. Led by Mohamed Effendi Nashid, this team played for Egypt against British army teams and included Ahmed Rifaat, Mohamed Khairy, and the Gibril brothers.

This team's goal was to elevate football from a neighborhood-based activity to a national one. Football activity remained limited to neighborhood and school teams until the establishment of clubs. Egypt witnessed its first competition when the newspaper Al-Impressiali presented a cup in its name to the champion of a tournament in which foreign community teams participated. The tournament lasted one season and was won by the Hockey Club of Bulaq (Railway). In 1908, the International Olympic Committee selected Angelo Polanki (of Greek nationality) to represent Egypt on the committee. Polanki began establishing the Mixed Federation of Sports Clubs in Egypt, choosing Alexandria as its headquarters. The federation included seven members of various nationalities, none of whom were Egyptian.

After the Egyptian Football Association (EFA) had consolidated its control over all sporting activities, it decided to extend its authority to football. In 1913, it organized a competition in which several Alexandria clubs and some Egyptian and foreign teams in Cairo participated. The winner received a medal depicting Alexander the Great on one side and the date of the competition on the other. However, the Egyptian clubs rebelled against the EFA's activities, refusing to participate in its competitions and limiting themselves to friendly matches amongst themselves. Meanwhile, school sports had become organized into official competitions under the supervision of Ahmed Heshmat Pasha, the Minister of Education.

In 1916, some Egyptian figures managed to assemble a team composed of most of the top players. This team, representing Egypt, played against the British Armed Forces team at the Zamalek SC stadium on May 5, 1916. The Egyptian team won 4-2. The Egyptian lineup included Mahmoud Marei in goal, Ibrahim Othman and Mohamed El-Selhadar in defense, Mustafa Hassan, Suleiman Fayek, and Riad Shawky in midfield, and Hussein Fawzy, Kamel Abdel Rabbo, Taha Farghal, Abbas Safwat, and Nicola Arqji in attack. The Egyptian elements opposed to the activities of the Mixed Union saw the need to form a body operating independently of its authority. They sought to coordinate their activities with British forces, and at on Monday, September 11, 1916, the first meeting was held at the Egyptian Mail newspaper. Representatives of the British forces and 50 delegates from clubs in Cairo, Alexandria, Port Said, and Tanta were in attendance. Clubs from Beni Suef, Sharqia, and Mansoura also sent written approval of the project. All agreed to establish a federation to organize football competitions throughout Egypt. The first competition was the Sultan Hussein Cup, a gift from Sultan Hussein Kamel, in which Egyptian and foreign teams would compete.

The success of the Sultan Hussein Cup in its early years had a significant impact on the flourishing and spread of the game. The 1919 revolution against the British occupation encouraged nationalist elements to rid themselves of foreign influence and began striving to Egyptianize football. On September 14, 1919, Ibrahim Allam and Hussein Hegazi issued the first invitation to discuss the Egyptianization of football, calling for a meeting at the office of lawyer Ahmed Bey Lotfi in the Opera Squarein Cairo on Tuesday, September 16, 1919.

By the summer of 1921, the efforts of the nationalist elements had borne fruit, and the various committees convened to establish the federation's constitution and competition regulations. On December 3, 1921, the Egyptian Football Association was founded, and its first management committee was formed. This committee included Jaafar Wali Pasha as president, Fouad Abaza Bey as vice president, Youssef Effendi Mohamed as secretary, Ismail Effendi Sirry as treasurer, and members Abbas Helmy Zaghloul, Mohamed Sobhi, Ibrahim Allam, Nicola Arqaji, Taher El-Sargani, Zakaria Abbas, Riad Shawky, Abdel Hamid Moharram, Ali Sadek, Mohamed Gaheen, and Mohamed Ibrahim.

The committee began its meetings at the Agricultural Club in Opera Square, then moved the federation's headquarters to Al Ahly Club, then to Madabigh Street, then to Shawarby Street, before finally settling at its current location at 5 El-Gabalaya Street in Gezira.

== Controversy ==
Christians make up approximately 5–9% of Egypt's population, the majority of whom are Coptic Orthodox Christians. Despite their significant numbers, there are currently no Coptic members on the national football team. However, in the past, there have been notable Christian players, such as Hany Ramzy. Additionally, prominent Christian families, like the Sawiris family, own major football clubs, including El Gouna FC and ZED FC.

Over the years, there have been numerous reports and complaints (both formal and informal) from Coptic advocacy groups and community members, such as Coptic Solidarity, regarding the alleged exclusion of Christians from the football league and Egypt's national team. A similar complaint was filed by Coptic Solidarity to the International Olympic Committee (IOC) concerning the exclusion of Christians from Egypt's Olympic teams. These exclusions have been described as systematic, though neither FIFA nor the IOC has initiated any investigations into these claims.

== Awards ==
=== EFA Player of the Year ===
Year	Player	Club
1976	(Egypt) Hassan Shehata	Zamalek SC
2000-01	(Egypt) Tarek El-Said	Zamalek SC
2001-02	(Egypt) Mohamed Barakat	Ismaily SC
2002-03	(Egypt) Hazem Emam	Zamalek SC
2005	(Egypt) Mohamed Aboutrika	Al Ahly SC
2006	(Egypt) Mohamed Aboutrika	Al Ahly SC
2007	(Egypt) Mohamed Aboutrika	Al Ahly SC
2008	(Egypt) Mohamed Aboutrika	Al Ahly SC
2021-22	(Egypt) Zizo	Zamalek SC
2022-23	(Egypt) Hussein El Shahat	Al Ahly SC
2023-24	(Egypt) Zizo	Zamalek SC
2024-25	(Egypt) Emam Ashour	Al Ahly SC

=== Coach of the Year ===
Year	Player	Club
2000-01	(Egypt) Anwar Salama	El Qanah FC
2001-02	(Egypt) Mohsen Saleh	Ismaily SC
2002-03	(Egypt) Taha Basry	ENPPI SC
2022-23	(Switzerland) Marcel Koller	Al Ahly SC
2023-24	(Switzerland) Marcel Koller	Al Ahly SC
2024-25	(Croatia) Krunoslav Jurčić	Pyramids FC

=== Goalkeeper of the Year ===
Year	Player	Club
2000-01	(Egypt) Mohamed Sobhy	Ismaily SC
2001-02	(Egypt) Essam El Hadary	Al Ahly SC
2002-03	(Egypt) Abdel-Wahed El-Sayed	Zamalek SC
2022-23	(Egypt) Mohamed El Shenawy	Al Ahly SC
2023-24	(Egypt) Mostafa Shobeir	Al Ahly SC
2024-25	(Egypt) Mohamed El Shenawy	Al Ahly SC

=== Young Player of the Year ===
Year	Player	Club
2000-01	(Egypt) Mido	Zamalek SC
2001-02	(Egypt) Hossam Ghaly	Al Ahly SC
2002-03	(Egypt) Ahmed Fathy	Ismaily SC
2021-22	(Egypt) Ibrahim Adel	Pyramids FC
2022-23	(Egypt) Ibrahim Adel	Pyramids FC

=== Best Player abroad ===
Year	Player	Club
2002	(Egypt) Mido	(Netherlands) Ajax
2003	(Egypt) Mido	(Netherlands) Ajax

== See also ==
- Egyptian Premier League
- Egypt Cup
- Egyptian League Cup
- Egyptian Super Cup
- Egyptian Women's Premier League
- Egypt national football team
- Egypt national under-23 football team
- Egypt national under-20 football team
- Egypt national under-17 football team
- Egypt national futsal team
- Egypt national beach soccer team
- Egypt women's national football team
- Egypt women's national futsal team
- Egypt vs Iran at the 2026 FIFA World Cup
