= 2019 UNAF U-20 Women's Tournament =

Tournament details
- Country: Morocco
- Dates: 1–8 October
- Teams: 4

Final positions
- Champions: Morocco
- Runners-up: Burkina Faso
- Third place: Algeria

Tournament statistics
- Matches played: 6
- Goals scored: 22 (3.67 per match)

The 2019 UNAF U-20 Women's Tournament was the 1st edition of the UNAF U-20 Women's Tournament. The tournament took place in Morocco, from 1 to 8 October 2019.

== Participants ==
- Algeria
- Burkina Faso (invited)
- Morocco (hosts)
- Tunisia
- Egypt (withdrew)
- Libya (withdrew)

== Tournament ==
Team	Pld	W	D	L	GF	GA	GD	Pts
Morocco	3	3	0	0	7	2	+5	9
Burkina Faso	3	2	0	1	5	3	+2	6
Algeria	3	1	0	2	10	5	+5	3
Tunisia	3	0	0	3	0	12	−12	0

=== Matches ===
3 October 2019

Algeria	8–0	Tunisia
Ournani 2', 35', 54', 58', 79'; Bekhti 5', 78'; Bahri 33'	Report

3 October 2019

Burkina Faso	1–2	Morocco
Goungounga 45'		El Bastali 10' (pen.); Ahmamou 47'

5 October 2019

Tunisia	0–2	Burkina Faso
		Congo 12'; Kaboré 19'

5 October 2019

Morocco	3–1	Algeria
Al Bastali 7'; Gharbi Berrima 19'; Redouani 37' (pen.)	Report	Ournani 40'

7 October 2019
14:45 UTC+1

Algeria	1–2	Burkina Faso
Seghiri 79'	Report	Ilboudo 23'; Goungounga 35' (pen.)

7 October 2019
16:30 UTC+1

Tunisia	0–2	Morocco
	Report	Ben Houssine 17'; Bouftini 46'
