= Algeria women's national under-20 football team =

Algeria Under-20
- Nickname: الأفناك (The Fennecs)
- Association: Algerian Football Federation
- Other affiliation: UAFA (Arab Nations)
- Confederation: CAF (Africa)
- Sub-confederation: UNAF (North Africa)
- Head coach: Azzedine Chih
- Home stadium: Omar Hamadi Stadium
- FIFA code: ALG
First colours	Second colours

First international
- Algeria 2–3 Liberia (Algiers, Algeria, 2 April 2006)

Biggest win
- South Sudan 0–5 Algeria (Kampala, Uganda, 19 January 2020)

Biggest defeat
- Algeria 0–5 Ghana (Algiers, Algeria, 15 September 2017); Ghana 5–0 Algeria (Cape Coast, Ghana, 1 October 2017)

African World Cup qualification
- Appearances: 4 (first in 2006)
- Best result: Round 2 (2006)

FIFA U-20 Women's World Cup
- Appearances: None

The Algeria U-20 women's national football team (Arabic: منتخب الجزائر لكرة القدم للسيدات ما تحت 20 سنة) represents Algeria in international women's football at the under-20 level. The team plays its home games at the Omar Hamadi Stadium in Algiers and is coached by Azzedine Chih. Algeria played its first match on April 2, 2006 against Liberia, and lost 2–3.

== History ==
=== Early history ===
The early history of the Algeria women's national under-20 football team dates back to its establishment in 2006. Since then, the team has aimed to develop young female football talents in the country and provide them with opportunities to showcase their skills at the international level. The team's formation has been part of the broader efforts to promote women's football in Algeria and increase participation among young women.

Algeria's first international game was a 2–3 defeat against Liberia as part of the 2006 African U-20 Women's World Cup qualification.

The Algeria women's national under-20 football team made a notable comeback to the international stage in 2015 after a hiatus of nine years. Their return coincided with their participation in the first round of the 2015 African U-20 Women's World Cup qualification. However, the Algerian team faced tough opposition from their Burkinabe counterparts and ultimately lost with an aggregate score of 2–3.

In the 2018 world cup qualifiers, the team faced a resilient Ghanaian side and unfortunately suffered defeat in both matches, with a scoreline of five-nil per match in favor of Ghana.

The year 2019 marked the team's debut in the inaugural 2019 UNAF U-20 Women's Tournament. During the tournament, the team displayed their capabilities by securing a 3rd-place finish. Notably, they achieved a resounding victory against Tunisia with a score of 8–0. However, they faced defeats against Morocco and Burkina Faso with scores of 1–3 and 1–2, respectively.

Continuing their journey, the team participated in the 2020 African U-20 Women's World Cup qualification. In the preliminary round, they faced South Sudan and demonstrated their strength by emerging victorious in both matches. The Algerian team showcased their prowess with impressive scorelines of 5–0 and 4–0 in their favor.

=== Under the new Administration ===
With the appointment of Farid Benstiti as the coach of the Senior National team, women's football in Algeria witnessed a resurgence. Consequently, the Algerian women's national under-20 team was reinstated to participate in the 2023 UNAF U-20 Women's Tournament held in Sousse, Tunisia. Despite limited preparation stages and training camp, the team put up a commendable performance, finishing in 2nd place behind Morocco, who secured the top position due to a superior goal difference.

During the tournament, the Algerian team showcased their abilities by securing victories in two games. They defeated Tunisia with a scoreline of 4–2 and triumphed over Egypt with a score of 2–1.

In July 2023, French coach Pierre-Yves Bodineau was appointed as head coach for the national team.

== Results and fixtures ==
The following is a list of match results in the last 12 months, as well as any future matches that have been scheduled.

Legend

Win Draw Lose Fixture

== Coaching staff ==
=== Current coaching staff ===
As of 10 July 2023

Position	Name
Head coach	(France) Pierre-Yves Bodineau
Assistant coach	(Algeria) Nadir Maadsi
Goalkeeping coach	(Algeria) Morad Boubgtiten
Physical coach	(Algeria) Redhouane Bentouma

== Players ==
=== Current squad ===
- The following players were called up for the 2024 African U-20 Women's World Cup qualification matches against Mali.
- Match dates: 8 and 13 October 2023
- Opposition: Mali

Head coach: Nadir Maâdsi

No.	Pos.	Player	Date of birth (age)	Club
	GK	Chaima Aourtilane	11 April 2006 (age 20)	(Algerian Football Federation) CF Akbou
	GK	Amel Benabdallah	19 October 2004 (age 22)	(Algerian Football Federation) CF Akbou
	GK	Célia Remili	13 August 2006 (age 20)	(French Football Federation) Metz
	DF	Elmira Djaraoui	17 July 2005 (age 21)	(French Football Federation) Lille
	DF	Ikram Hammoudi	17 September 2005 (age 21)	(French Football Federation) Toulouse
	DF	Ikram Sidi Moussa	12 June 2004 (age 22)	(French Football Federation) AS Monaco
	DF	Lisa Jacob	18 January 2005 (age 21)	(French Football Federation) Metz
	DF	Meriem Mihoubi	2005 (age 20–21)	(Royal Spanish Football Federation) Mislata CF
	MF	Leïla Elhadj	23 June 2005 (age 21)	(Royal Moroccan Football Federation) RS Berkane
	MF	Lyna Habbas	5 January 2006 (age 20)	(French Football Federation) Lille
	MF	Mélissa Bethi	18 November 2005 (age 20)	(French Football Federation) Metz
	MF	Madina Nador	12 April 2004 (age 22)	(French Football Federation) Le Havre
	MF	Shania Hamzaoui	29 July 2005 (age 21)	(French Football Federation) Montauban
	MF	Sarah Guellil	2 June 2006 (age 20)	(French Football Federation) Bordeaux
	FW	Thiziri Baâli	10 June 2004 (age 22)	(Algerian Football Federation) JS Kabylie
	FW	Amélia Zemma	17 December 2005 (age 20)	(French Football Federation) Sarcelles
	FW	Lynda Bendris	25 July 2004 (age 22)	(French Football Federation) AS Cannes
		Lina Tamaguelt		(Algerian Football Federation) CF Akbou
		Nada Belkhoudja		(Algerian Football Federation) Afak Relizane
		Melissa Betrouni		(Algerian Football Federation) ASE Alger Centre
		Aya Keddache		(Algerian Football Federation) ASV Tizi Ouzou
		Salma Hadji		(French Football Federation) Metz
		Léna Himi-Fahrer	2005 (age 20–21)	(French Football Federation) RC Strasbourg
		Lina Berkous		(French Football Federation) GPSO 92 Issy
		Kézia Romero	7 March 2006 (age 20)	(French Football Federation) Tarascon

=== Recent call-ups ===
The following players have also been called up to the Algeria squad within the last 24 months.

Pos.	Player	Date of birth (age)	Caps	Goals	Club	Latest call-up

== Competitive record ==
=== FIFA U-20 Women's World Cup record ===
FIFA U-20 Women's World Cup
Appearances: 0
Year	Round	Position	Pld	W	D	L	GF	GA
(Canada) 2002	Did not enter							
(Thailand) 2004	Did not enter							
(Russia) 2006	Did not qualify							
(Chile) 2008	Did not enter							
(Germany) 2010	Did not enter							
(Japan) 2012	Did not enter							
(Canada) 2014	Did not enter							
(Papua New Guinea) 2016	Did not qualify							
(France) 2018	Did not qualify							
(Costa Rica) 2022	Did not enter							
(Colombia) 2024	Did not qualify							
(Poland) 2026	Did not qualify							
Total		0/12	0	0	0	0	0	0

=== African U-20 Women's World Cup qualification record ===
African U-20 Women's World Cup qualification
Appearances: 5
Year	Round	Position	Pld	W	D	L	GF	GA
2002	Did not enter							
2004	Did not enter							
2006	Round 2		1	0	0	1	2	3
2008	Did not enter							
2010	Did not enter							
2012	Did not enter							
2014	Did not enter							
2015	Round 1		2	0	1	1	2	3
2018	Round 1		2	0	0	2	0	10
2020	Cancelled		2	2	0	0	9	0
2022	Did not enter							
2024	Round 2		2	1	0	1	2	2
2026	To be determined							
Total	Round 2	5/12	9	3	1	5	15	18

=== UNAF U-20 Women's Tournament ===
UNAF U-20 Women's Tournament record
Year	Round	Position	Pld	W	D	L	GF	GA
(Morocco) 2019	Third-place	3rd	3	1	0	2	10	5
(Tunisia) 2023	Runner-up	2nd	3	2	1	0	7	4
(Tunisia) 2025	To be determined							
Total		3/3	6	3	1	2	17	9

== See also ==
- Algeria women's national football team
- Algeria women's national under-17 football team
