= Tunisia women's national football team results =

The Tunisia women's national football team is the representative women's association football team of Tunisia. Its governing body is the Tunisian Football Federation (TFF) and it competes as a member of the Confederation of African Football (CAF).

== All−time record against FIFA recognized nations ==
The list shown below shows the Tunisia national football team all−time international record against opposing nations.
*As of 1 November 2025 after match against Chad.

Key

Positive balance (more wins than losses)
Neutral balance (as many wins as losses)
Negative balance (more losses than wins)

Against	Pld	W	D	L	GF	GA	GD	Confederation
Algeria	22	6	6	10	29	38	−9	CAF
Burkina Faso	2	1	1	0	2	0	+2	CAF
Cameroon	1	0	0	1	0	2	−2	CAF
Congo	2	1	1	0	6	3	+3	CAF
Egypt	12	8	2	2	31	12	+19	CAF
Equatorial Guinea	2	1	0	1	7	3	+4	CAF
France	1	0	0	1	1	2	−1	UEFA
Ghana	3	0	0	3	9	3	−6	CAF
India	1	1	0	0	1	0	+1	AFC
Ivory Coast	2	0	0	2	0	6	−6	CAF
Jordan	3	2	0	1	4	3	+1	AFC
Lebanon	2	1	1	0	16	0	+16	CAF
Mali	2	1	0	1	4	3	+1	CAF
Morocco	10	1	1	8	13	20	−7	CAF
Mauritania	1	1	0	0	3	0	+3	CAF
Niger	2	2	0	0	12	1	+11	CAF
Nigeria	2	0	1	1	0	3	−3	CAF
Palestine	2	2	0	0	12	4	+8	AFC
Senegal	4	0	2	2	5	2	−3	CAF
South Africa	4	1	0	3	2	4	−2	CAF
Sudan	1	1	0	0	12	1	+11	CAF
Syria	1	1	0	0	10	0	+10	AFC
Switzerland	1	0	0	1	0	1	−1	UEFA
Tanzania	2	0	1	1	1	6	−5	CAF
Togo	1	1	0	0	4	1	+3	CAF
Botswana	2	1	0	1	2	2	0	CAF
United Arab Emirates	1	1	0	0	4	0	+4	AFC
Zambia	1	0	0	1	0	1	−1	CAF
Zimbabwe	1	0	0	1	0	1	−1	CAF
Kenya	2	0	1	1	0	1	−1	CAF
Chad	1	0	0	1	0	1	−1	CAF
Total	95	34	17	44	187	144	+43	

== Record per opponent ==
*As of 1 November 2025 after match against Chad.

Key

Positive balance (more wins than losses)
Neutral balance (as many wins as losses)
Negative balance (more losses than wins)

The following table shows Tunisia's all-time official international record per opponent:

Opponent	Pld	W	D	L	GF	GA	GD	W%	Confederation
Algeria	22	6	6	10	29	38	−9	27.27	CAF
Zimbabwe	1	0	0	1	0	1	−1	0.00	CAF
Switzerland	1	0	0	1	0	1	−1	0.00	UEFA
France	1	0	0	1	1	2	−1	0.00	UEFA
Ivory Coast	2	0	0	2	0	6	−6	0.00	CAF
Burkina Faso	2	1	1	0	2	0	+2	50.00	CAF
Senegal	4	0	2	2	5	2	−3	0.00	CAF
Mali	2	1	0	1	4	3	+1	50.00	CAF
Equatorial Guinea	2	1	0	1	7	3	+4	50.00	CAF
Egypt	12	8	2	2	31	12	+19	66.67	CAF
Niger	2	2	0	0	12	1	+11	100.00	CAF
Congo	2	1	1	0	6	3	+3	50.00	CAF
Sudan	1	1	0	0	12	1	+11	100.00	CAF
Togo	1	1	0	0	4	1	+3	100.00	CAF
Botswana	2	1	0	1	2	2	0	50.00	CAF
Ghana	3	0	0	3	3	9	−6	0.00	CAF
Zambia	1	0	0	1	0	1	−1	0.00	CAF
Cameroon	1	0	0	1	0	2	−2	0.00	CAF
Jordan	3	2	0	1	4	3	+1	66.67	AFC
United Arab Emirates	1	1	0	0	4	0	+4	100.00	AFC
India	1	1	0	0	1	0	+1	100.00	AFC
Mauritania	1	1	0	0	3	0	+3	100.00	CAF
Morocco	10	1	1	8	13	20	−7	10.00	CAF
Nigeria	2	0	1	1	0	3	−3	0.00	CAF
Palestine	2	2	0	0	12	4	+8	100.00	AFC
South Africa	4	1	0	3	2	4	−2	25.00	CAF
Syria	1	1	0	0	10	0	+10	100.00	AFC
Tanzania	2	0	1	1	1	6	−5	0.00	CAF
Lebanon	2	1	1	0	16	0	+16	50.00	CAF
Kenya	2	0	1	1	0	1	−1	0.00	CAF
Chad	1	0	0	1	0	1	−1	0.00	CAF
Total	95	34	17	44	187	144	+43	35.79	—

== Results ==
=== 2006 ===
20 April 2006 Arab Women's Championship	Egypt	2–1	Tunisia	Alexandria, Egypt
17:00 UTC+2	Abdulmalek 54'; Rashad 79' (pen.)		Hadhraoui 6'	Stadium: Alexandria Stadium

22 April 2006 Arab Women's Championship	Palestine	0–4	Tunisia	Alexandria, Egypt
15:00 UTC+2			Abidi 13', 16', 79'; Zine 15'	Stadium: Alexandria Stadium

24 April 2006 Arab Women's Championship	Tunisia	10–0	Syria	Alexandria, Egypt
14:00 UTC+2				Stadium: Alexandria Stadium

26 April 2006 Arab Women's Championship	Algeria	3–0	Tunisia	Alexandria, Egypt
14:00 UTC+2				Stadium: Alexandria Stadium

29 April 2006 Arab Women's Championship	Egypt	1–2	Tunisia	Alexandria, Egypt
13:00 UTC+2				Stadium: Alexandria Stadium

=== 2007 ===
5 May Friendly	Algeria	4–2	Tunisia

8 May Friendly	Algeria	2–1	Tunisia

26 June Friendly	Tunisia	1–0	Algeria

29 June Friendly	Tunisia	0–4	Algeria

30 November 2008 African Women's Championship qualification	Tunisia	Cancelled	Egypt

16 December 2008 African Women's Championship qualification	Egypt	Cancelled	Tunisia

=== 2008 ===
18 February 2008 Friendly	Tunisia	0–1	Switzerland	, Tunisie

24 February 2008 2008 African Women's Championship qualification	Tunisia	0–0	Algeria
		Report

8 March 2008 2008 African Women's Championship qualification	Algeria	1–2	Tunisia	Stade de Béni Khalled, Béni Khalled
	Idoughi 19'	Report	Guedri 8' (pen.); Zouaoui 90+3'	Referee: Houaïda Brahim Sayed (Egypt)

31 August 2008 Friendly	Tunisia	1–3	Mali	Modibo Keita, Mali
	Chebdi 90'	Report	Samaké 33'; Doumbia 66'; Touré 83'

23 October 2008 Friendly	Tunisia	3–0	Mali	, Tunisie

16 November 2008 2008 African Women's Championship	South Africa	2–1	Tunisia	Estadio La Libertad, Bata
15:30 UTC+1	Matlou; Ngwane		Guedri

19 November 2008 2008 African Women's Championship	Tunisia	0–0	Nigeria	Estadio La Libertad, Bata
15:30 UTC+1

22 November 2008 2008 African Women's Championship	Ghana	3–2	Tunisia	Estadio I-nternacional, Malabo
15:00 UTC+1	Ibrahim 45+1'; Abdul-Rahman 51' 82'		Mamay 4'; Abidi 48'

=== 2009 ===
23 June 2009 Friendly	Algeria	4–0	Tunisia	Stade Antoine-Baptiste, Six-Fours-les-Plages, France
	Lilia BOUMRAR 23'; Dalila ZERROUKI 39'; Sabrina MOUSSAOUI 65'; Nabila IMLOUL 86'	Report

25 June 2009 Friendly	Tunisia	1–2	FranceA'	Stade Antoine-Baptiste, Six-Fours-les-Plages, France
	Mlayeh 82'	Report	Haziraj 14', 65'

4 November 2009 2009 UNAF Women's Tournament	Tunisia	1–0	Algeria	Stade Bou Ali-Lahouar, Hammam Sousse
15:00	Mlayeh 78'

6 November 2009 2009 UNAF Women's Tournament	Tunisia	6–2	Egypt	Stade El Menzah, Tunis
15:00	Mlayeh 5', 72'; Chebbi 11' (pen.); Hannachi 31'; Mamay 80'; Abidi 85'		Abdallah 36'; Mansour 83' (pen.)

=== 2010 ===
7 November 2010 Friendly	Tunisia	8–4	Palestine	, Tunisie

22 May 2010 2010 African Women's Championship qualification	Algeria	1–1	Tunisia	Stade de Koléa, Koléa
17:00 UTC+2	Bouhenni 90+5'	Report	Chebbi 73' (pen.)	Referee: Incaf El Harkaoui (Morocco)

5 June 2010 2010 African Women's Championship qualification	Tunisia	0–1	Algeria	Stade El Menzah, Tunis
17:00 UTC+2		Report	Wadah 65'	Referee: Therese Sagno (Guinea)

=== 2011 ===
23 November 2011 Friendly	Zimbabwe	1–0	Tunisia	, Tunisie

25 November 2011 Friendly	Egypt	1–0	Tunisia

15 January 2011 2012 CAF Women's Pre-Olympic Tournament	Morocco	0–3	Tunisia	El Jadida, Morocco
		Report	Chebbi 3'; Houij 21'; Mlayeh 62'	Stadium: Stade El Abdi

29 January 2011 2012 CAF Women's Pre-Olympic Tournament	Tunisia	0–1	Morocco

2 April 2011 2012 CAF Women's Pre-Olympic Tournament	South Africa	1–0	Tunisia	Umlazi, South Africa
13:00 UTC+2	Matlou 47'	Report		Stadium: King Zwelithini Stadium

17 April 2011 2012 CAF Women's Pre-Olympic Tournament	Tunisia	1–0 (5–6 p)	South Africa

=== 2012 ===
14 January 2012 2012 African Women's Championship qualification	Morocco	2–0	Tunisia	Rabat
	Jraidi 25'; Chebbak 63'	Report

28 January 2012 2012 African Women's Championship qualification	Tunisia	2–0 (3–5 p)	Morocco	Soliman
	Houij 15', 37'

=== 2014 ===
16 February 2014 2014 African Women's Championship qualification	Egypt	0–3	Tunisia	Al Ahly Training Centre, 6th October City
15:30 UTC+2		Report	Hidouri 23'; Gomri 45'; Maknoun 50'	Referee: Alla Ali Abdelssmad (Sudan)

1 March 2014 2014 African Women's Championship qualification	Tunisia	2–2	Egypt	Stade 15 Octobre, Bizerte
15:00 UTC+1	Houij 4' (pen.); Hidouri 61'	Report	Tarek 18'; Abdallah 77'	Referee: Nabikko Ssemambo (Uganda)

23 May 2014 2014 African Women's Championship qualification	Algeria	2–1	Tunisia	Stade Omar Hamadi, Algiers
18:00 UTC+1	Laifa 1'; Sekouane 45' (pen.)	Report	Kaabachi 20'	Referee: Aissatou Keita (Guinea)

8 June 2014 2014 African Women's Championship qualification	Tunisia	2–3	Algeria	Stade 15 Octobre, Bizerte
16:00 UTC+1	Kaabachi 13', 32'	Report	Bouhenni 8'; Bekhedda 44' (pen.); Sekouane 81'	Referee: Damaris Kimani (Kenya)

=== 2015 ===
22 May 2015 2015 CAF Women's Olympic Qualifying Tournament	Ivory Coast	Cancelled	Tunisia
		Report

29 May 2015 2015 CAF Women's Olympic Qualifying Tournament	Tunisia	Cancelled	Ivory Coast
		Report

12 May 2015 Friendly	Egypt	0–2	Tunisia	stade Olympique d’El Menzah, Tunis
		Report	ben Maaouia (??)

15 December 2015 Friendly	Tunisia	1–1	Algeria	stade Bouloughine, Alger
17:30	Kaabachi 4'	Report	?? (??)

18 December 2015 Friendly	Tunisia	3–1	Algeria	Centre Technique National de la FAF, Sidi Moussa
16:00	Kaabachi 23'; Ben Chaaben 44'; Mchara 76'	Report	?? (??)

=== 2016 ===
5 March 2016 2016 Africa Women Cup of Nations qualification	Burkina Faso	0–0	Tunisia	Stade du 4 Août, Ouagadougou
		Report		Referee: Kankou Coulibaly (Mali)

19 March 2016 2016 Africa Women Cup of Nations qualification	Tunisia	2–0	Burkina Faso	Stade Oued Ellil, Oued Ellil
	Mamay 52'; Mchara 89'	Report		Referee: Khadmallah Elsayed Angato Koko (Sudan)

6 April 2016 2016 Africa Women Cup of Nations qualification	Tunisia	1–2	Ghana	Stade Oued Ellil, Oued Ellil
	Kaabachi 33' (pen.)		Suleman 50'; Adubea 84'	Referee: Fadouma Dia (Senegal)

12 April 2016 2016 Africa Women Cup of Nations qualification	Ghana	4–0	Tunisia	Accra Sports Stadium, Accra
	Suleman 28', 85'; Boakye 34'; Adubea 77'	Report		Referee: Chancelle Cynthia Imane Ngakossa (Congo)

=== 2020 ===
28 January 2020 Friendly	Tunisia	1–2	Morocco	Stade Boubker Amer, Salé
	?? (??)	Report	Addi 13'; Knaidil 90'

31 January 2020 Friendly	Tunisia	3–6	Morocco	Stade Municipal de Témara, Témara
	Houij 7'; Lamti 60'; Ellouzi 82'	Report	Addi 10'; Salmi 13'; Tagnaout 37', 63'; Jraidi 71', 88'

14 February 2020 2020 UNAF Women's Tournament	Tunisia	0–1	Morocco	El Kram Stadium, El Kram
13:00		Report	Mssoudy 63'

16 February 2020 2020 UNAF Women's Tournament	Tunisia	3–0	Mauritania	El Kram Stadium, El Kram
13:00	Laamiri 33'; Mchara 48' (pen.); Ben Mohamed 81'	Report

20 February 2020 2020 UNAF Women's Tournament	Tunisia	1–1	Algeria	El Kram Stadium, El Kram
13:00	Jemai 11'	Report	Merrouche 21' (pen.)

22 February 2020 2020 UNAF Women's Tournament	Tunisia	1–1	Tanzania	El Kram Stadium, El Kram
13:00	Houij 5'	Report	Masaka 68'

=== 2021 ===
10 June Friendly	Jordan	1–2	Tunisia	Amman, Jordan
	Jbarah 66' (pen.)	Report (GSA); Report (SW)	Kaabachi 43' (pen.); Jeddi 87'	Stadium: King Abdullah II Stadium; Referee: Esra'a Al Mbaidin (Jordan)

13 June Friendly	Jordan	0–2	Tunisia	Amman, Jordan
		Report (GSA); Report (SW)	Lamti 34'; Hamdi 81'	Stadium: King Abdullah II Stadium; Referee: Haneen Murad (Jordan)

24 August 2021 Arab Women's Cup	Tunisia	0–0	Lebanon	Cairo, Egypt
21:00 UTC+2		Report (UAFA); Report (SW)		Stadium: Police Academy Stadium; Referee: Bouchra Karboubi (Morocco)

27 August 2021 Arab Women's Cup	Tunisia	12–1	Sudan	Cairo, Egypt
17:00 UTC+2	Jeddi; Mchara; Ouni; Maknoun; Masoud; Jemaii; Aboud; Hattab	Report (UAFA); Report (SW)	Abdelmoneim	Stadium: Police Academy Stadium

30 August 2021 Arab Women's Cup	Tunisia	2–2	Egypt	Cairo, Egypt
17:00 UTC+2	Jeddi 48'; Ellouzi 73'	Report (UAFA); Report (SW)	Ghazi 44', 53'	Stadium: Police Academy Stadium

3 September Arab Women's Cup Semi-finals	Tunisia	2–2 (4–3 p)	Algeria	Cairo, Egypt
17:00 UTC+2	Ayadi 6'; Ellouzi 46'	Report (UAFA); Report (SW)	Merrouche 45+1'; Bouhenni 66'	Stadium: Osman Ahmed Osman Stadium
	Penalties
	(penalty scored) Ellouzi; (penalty scored) Ouni; (penalty scored) Jmaii; (penalty scored) Ayadi		Kendouci (penalty scored); Arbi-Aouda (penalty scored); Ouadah (penalty scored); Hamidèche (penalty missed); Daoui (penalty missed)

6 September Arab Women's Cup finals	Jordan	1–0	Tunisia	Cairo, Egypt
20:00 UTC+2	Jbarah 85'			Stadium: Osman Ahmed Osman Stadium

4 October Friendly	India	0–1	Tunisia	Dubai, United Arab Emirates
		Report	Houij 8' (pen.)	Stadium: Theyab Awana Stadium

6 October Friendly	United Arab Emirates	0–4	Tunisia	Dubai, United Arab Emirates
		Report	Troudi 7'; Abboud 51'; Houij 63'; Mamay 85'	Stadium: Theyab Awana Stadium

20 October 2022 AFWCON qualification First round 1st leg	Egypt	2–6	Tunisia	Cairo, Egypt
14:00 CEST (UTC+2)	Laila Cherif 7'; Dana Nadda 65'	Report	Leïla Maknoun 5'; Ella Kaabachi 31', 47', 78'; Meriem Houij (74.pen); Sabrine Ellouzi 82'	Stadium: Petro Sport Stadium; Referee: Bouchra Karboubi (Morocco)

26 October 2022 AFWCON qualification First round 2nd leg	Tunisia	1–0	Egypt	Tunis, Tunisia
14:00 CEST (UTC+2)	Houij 90+1' (pen.)	Report		Stadium: Stade El Menzah; Referee: Mame Coumba Faye (Senegal)

25 November Friendly	Tunisia	0–1	Algeria	Ariana, Tunisia
15:00		Report	weld Brahem 38'	Stadium: Ariana stadium

28 November Friendly	Tunisia	2–4	Algeria	Ariana, Tunisia
15:00	Kaabachi 55'; Laamiri 56'	Report	Belkacemi 38'; Koui 40'; Taleb 42'; Adjabi 78'	Stadium: Ariana stadium

=== 2022 ===
18 February 2022 AFWCON qualification Second round 1st leg	Tunisia	5–0	Equatorial Guinea	Soliman
15:00 UTC+2	Houij 2', 31', 45+3'; Ellouzi 55', 65'	Report		Stadium: Stade Municipal de Soliman; Referee: Lamia Athmane (Algeria)

22 February 2022 AFWCON qualification Second round 2nd leg	Equatorial Guinea	3–2 (3–7 agg.)	Tunisia	Malabo
16:00 UTC+2	Obono 45'; Bokoka 85', 90'	Report	Houij 8'; Aouni 20'	Stadium: Estadio de Malabo; Referee: Marie Ngo Biem (Cameroon)
Note: Tunisia won 7–3 on aggregate.

28 June Friendly	Tunisia	0–0	Senegal	Tunis, Tunisia
17:00				Stadium: Chedli Zwitin

3 July 2022 2022 AFWCON GS	Tunisia	4–1	Togo	Casablanca, Morocco
21:00 UTC+0	Houij 1'; Ellouzi 12', 60'; Amé 71' (o.g.)		Gnintegma 22' (pen.)	Stadium: Stade Mohammed V Referee: Antsino Twanyanyukwa (Namibia)

6 July 2022 2022 AFWCON GS	Zambia	1–0	Tunisia	Casablanca, Morocco
16:00 UTC+0	Chitundu 90+2'			Stadium: Stade Mohammed V Referee: Maria Rivet (Mauritius)

9 July 2022 2022 AFWCON GS	Cameroon	2–0	Tunisia	Casablanca, Morocco
21:00 UTC+0	Abam 3'; Nchout 90'			Stadium: Stade Mohammed V Referee: Lidya Tafesse (Ethiopia)

14 July 2022 2022 AFWCON QF	South Africa	1–0	Tunisia	Rabat, Morocco
21:00	Seoposenwe 14'	Report (FIFA)		Stadium: Stade Moulay Hassan; Referee: Salima Mukansanga (Rwanda)

17 July 2022 2022 AFWCON Repechage	Senegal	0–0 (4–2 p)	Tunisia	Rabat, Morocco
18:00				Stadium: Stade Moulay Hassan; Referee: Letticia Viana (Eswatini)
	Penalties
	Diop (penalty scored); Diallo (penalty missed); Sow (penalty scored); N. Ndiaye (penalty scored); Fall (penalty scored)		(penalty scored) Ellouzi; (penalty missed) Houij; (penalty missed) Ayadi; (penalty scored) Aouni

=== 2023 ===
22 September 2023 2024 AFWCON qualification First round 1st leg	Tunisia	7–0	Niger	Soliman, Tunisia
16:00 UTC+1	Houij 14', 58'; Klai 43'; Ellouzi 67', 80', 90+2'; Hamdi 73'	Report (FTF)		Stadium: Stade municipal de Soliman

26 September 2023 2024 AFWCON qualification First round 2nd leg	Niger	1–5 (1–12 agg.)	Tunisia	Soliman, Tunisia
15:30 UTC+1	Hamed 90' (pen.)	Report (FTF)	Ellouzi 9', 49'; Mamay 15'; Houij 45+1' (pen.); Zemzem 77'	Stadium: Stade municipal de Soliman
Note: Tunisia won 12–1 on aggregate.

23-31October 2023 2024 Olympic qualifying	Tunisia	Cancelled	Ivory Coast

23-31October 2023 2024 Olympic qualifying	Ivory Coast	Cancelled	Tunisia
Note: Tunisia won on walkover after Ivory Coast withdrew.

27 October 2023 International Friendly	Tunisia	0–2	Senegal	Ariana, Tunisia
15:00		Report	Diop 14'; Mbodji 59'	Stadium: Stade Municipal d'Ariana

31 October 2023 International Friendly	Tunisia	2–3	Senegal	Ariana, Tunisia
15:00	Yasmine 66'; Kaabachi 90+5'		H. Diallo 9'; Fall 41' (pen.); Mbodji 56'	Stadium: Stade Municipal d'Ariana

29 November 2023 2024 AFWCON qualification Second round 1st leg	Tunisia	5–2	Congo	Soliman, Tunisia
14:30 UTC+1	Zemzem 13', 37', 57'; Houij 44'; Ellouzi 50'		56'; 87'	Stadium: Stade municipal de Soliman

5 December 2023 2024 AFWCON qualification Second round 2nd leg	Congo	1–1 (3–6 agg.)	Tunisia	Brazzaville, Congo
15:30 UTC+1	Bouanga 18'		Ellouzi 46'	Stadium: Stade Alphonse Massemba-Débat
Note: Tunisia won 6–3 on aggregate.

=== 2024 ===
23 February 2024 2024 Olympic qualifying	Tunisia	1–2	Morocco	Soliman, Tunisia
	Kaabachi 51'		Tagnaout 43'; Chebbak 54'	Stadium: Stade municipal de Soliman

28 February 2024 2024 Olympic qualifying	Morocco	4–1 (6–2 agg.)	Tunisia	Rabat, Morocco
	Tagnaout 11'; Jraïdi 16', 20', 22'		Zemzem 58'	Stadium: Moulay Hassan Stadium
Note: Morocco won 6–2 on aggregate.

4 April 2024 Friendly	Tunisia	2–1	Algeria	Tunis, Tunisia
15:00 UTC+1	Ayadi 60'; Hamdi 90+2'	Report (FAF)	Bouhenni 48'	Stadium: Chedly Zouiten Stadium

7 April 2024 Friendly	Tunisia	2–2	Algeria	Tunis, Tunisia
15:00 UTC+1	Ben Hadj Mahmoud 29'; Hamdi 69'	Report (FAF)	Bouhenni 20' (pen.), 44'	Stadium: Chedly Zouiten Stadium

11 July 2024 Tunis Women's Cup	Tanzania	5–0	Tunisia	Ariana, Tunisia
15:00 UTC+1	Juma 16', 28', 63'; Clement 41'; Minja 90+4'			Stadium: Stade Municipale d'Ariana

15 July 2024 Tunis Women's Cup	Tunisia	1–0	Botswana	Tunis, Tunisia
15:00 UTC+1	Shaiek 75'			Stadium: Chedly Zouiten Stadium

=== 2025 ===
21 February 2026 WAFCON qualifying	Kenya	0–0	Tunisia	Nairobi, Kenya
15:00 UTC+3		Report		Stadium: Ulinzi Sports Complex

26 February 2026 WAFCON qualifying	Tunisia	0–1	Kenya	Sousse, Tunisia
14:00 UTC+1		Report	Engesha 4'	Stadium: Sousse Olympic Stadium; Referee: Vincentia Amedome (Togo)

4 April Friendly	Morocco	3–1	Tunisia	Casablanca, Morocco
18:00 UTC+0	Mrabet 39'; Jraïdi 50'; I. El Ghazouani 54'	Report	Shaiek 48'	Stadium: Père Jégo Stadium; Referee: Natacha Konan Akissi (Ivory Coast)

8 April Friendly	Morocco B	2–4	Tunisia	Salé, Morocco
12:00 UTC+0	Bouftini 14'; El Madani 80'	Report	Khanchouch 2'; Zemzem 5'; Houij 72'; Ellouzi 75'	Stadium: Complexe Mohammed VI de football

6 July 2024 WAFCON GS	Nigeria	3−0	Tunisia	Casablanca, Morocco
17:00 UTC+1	Oshoala 4'; Babajide 45+1'; Ihezuo 84'	Report		Stadium: Larbi Zaouli Stadium; Referee: Suavis Iratunga (Burundi)

10 July 2024 WAFCON GS	Tunisia	0−0	Algeria	Casablanca, Morocco
17:00 UTC+1		Report		Stadium: Père Jégo Stadium; Referee: Akhona Makalima (South Africa)

13 July 2024 WAFCON GS	Tunisia	1−2	Botswana	Casablanca, Morocco
20:00 UTC+0	Khanchouch 12'	Report	Radiakanyo 66'; Ontlametse 90+5'	Stadium: Père Jégo Stadium; Referee: Aline Guimbang Etong (Cameroon)

26 October FIFA Unites Women's Series	Tunisia	16–0	Libya	Berrechid, Morocco
20:00 UTC+1	Mejri 5', 53'; Zerelli 13', 43'; Ammar 22', 39', 49'; Abbassi 24', 47'; Ben Kaabia 63', 73', 75', 88'; Nouhaili 66'; Lamti 78'; Khemili 85'	Report		Stadium: Berrechid Municipal Stadium; Referee: Haneen Murad (Jordan)

29 October FIFA Unites Women's Series	Tunisia	4–0	(Afghanistan) Afghan Women United	Berrechid, Morocco
17:00 UTC+1	Marzouki 7'; Mejri 11'; Abbassi 67'; Ammar 74'	Report		Stadium: Berrechid Municipal Stadium

1 November FIFA Unites Women's Series	Chad	1–0	Tunisia	Berrechid, Morocco
20:00 UTC+1	Larkingam 29'	Report		Stadium: Berrechid Municipal Stadium; Referee: Haneen Murad (Jordan)

=== 2026 ===
12 April Friendly	Tunisia	1–0	Benin	Manouba, Tunisia
14:00	Houij 89'			Stadium: Manouba Sports Complex

16 April Friendly	Tunisia	2–1	Comoros	Manouba, Tunisia
14:00	Nouhaili 3'; Abbassi 77'		Dahmani 5'	Stadium: Manouba Sports Complex; Referee: Sirine Abdelmalek (Tunisia)

5 June 2026 Friendly	Egypt	1–1 (4–2 p)	Tunisia	Cairo, Egypt
19:00 UTC+2	Khalifa 17'	Report	Houij 90'	Stadium: EFA Center; Referee: Shahenda El Maghrabi (Egypt)
	Penalties
	Ghazi (penalty scored); Khaled (penalty scored); Salama (penalty scored); Nadda (penalty scored)		(penalty missed) Houij; (penalty missed) Zemzem; (penalty scored) Guermazi; (penalty scored) Ouni

8 June 2026 Friendly	Tunisia	2–2 (6–7 p)	Egypt	Cairo, Egypt
19:00 UTC+2	Zemzem 5'; Guermazi 64'		tbc 60'; tbc 87'

8 October 2026 2028 Olympic Qualification Second round	Tunisia	0–1	Senegal	Radès
19:00 UTC+1		Report	Casset 63'	Stadium: Hammadi Agrebi Stadium; Referee: Chancelle Ngakosso (Congo)

13 October 2026 2028 Olympic Qualification Second round	Senegal	2–0 (3-0 agg.)	Tunisia	Dakar
17:00 UTC+0	N. Ndiaye 13', 27'			Stadium: Leopold Sédar Senghor Stadium; Referee: https://globalsportsarchive.com/en/soccer/match/2026-10-13/senegal-vs-tunisia/4549289
Note: Senegal won 3-0 on aggregate.

== See also ==
- Tunisia national football team results
- List of Tunisia women's international footballers
