= Tunisia national football team results =

This page shows the Tunisian national football team's record. The team played its first match on 2 June 1957 against Libya, which ended with Tunisia winning 4–2.

== Head-to-head records ==
The list shown below shows the Tunisia national football team all−time international record against opposing nations.

Key

Positive balance (more wins than losses)
Neutral balance (as many wins as losses)
Negative balance (more losses than wins)

Tunisia national football team head-to-head records
Against	Pld	W	D	L	GF	GA	GD	Confederation
Algeria	48	14	16	18	40	50	−10	CAF
Angola	7	3	4	0	15	5	+10	CAF
Argentina	1	0	0	1	1	2	−1	CONMEBOL
Australia	3	1	0	2	2	4	−2	AFC
Austria	4	0	1	3	2	6	−4	UEFA
Bahrain	2	1	0	1	3	1	+2	AFC
Belarus	1	1	0	0	3	0	+3	UEFA
Belgium	5	1	1	3	5	13	−8	UEFA
Benin	9	6	3	0	24	6	+18	CAF
Bosnia and Herzegovina	1	1	0	0	2	1	+1	UEFA
Botswana	10	5	3	2	16	8	+8	CAF
Brazil	3	0	1	2	3	10	−7	CONMEBOL
Bulgaria	2	1	1	0	6	3	+3	UEFA
Burkina Faso	8	2	3	3	9	8	+1	CAF
Burundi	3	3	0	0	5	2	+3	CAF
Cameroon	18	2	7	9	18	29	−11	CAF
Canada	2	1	1	0	2	0	+2	CONCACAF
Cape Verde	4	3 (Note: FIFA awarded Tunisia a 3–0 win as a result of Cape Verde fielding the player Fernando Varela, who had been sent off in the match against Equatorial Guinea on 24 March 2013. As a result of his sending off for unsporting conduct towards a match official, Varela had been given a four match suspension and would miss the rest of the qualifying campaign plus one further FIFA game. Varela did not participate in the games against Equatorial Guinea on 8 June 2013 or the game against Sierra Leone on 16 June 2013. Complicating matters, Varela's red card against Equatorial Guinea was removed from the FIFA.com website. The match originally ended 2–0 to Cape Verde.)	1	0	7	2	+5	CAF
Central African Republic	1	1	0	0	3	0	+3	CAF
Chad	4	3	1	0	10	2	+8	CAF
Chile	2	1	0	1	4	3	+1	CONMEBOL
China	4	1	2	1	3	3	0	AFC
Chinese Taipei	1	1	0	0	8	1	+7	AFC
Comoros	3	1	1	1	2	2	0	CAF
Colombia	2	0	1	1	1	2	−1	CONMEBOL
Congo	9	6	2	1	17	6	+11	CAF
Costa Rica	1	1	0	0	1	0	+1	CONCACAF
Croatia	2	1	1	0	2	1	+1	UEFA
Denmark	3	0	1	2	2	5	−3	UEFA
Djibouti	2	2	0	0	11	1	+10	CAF
DR Congo (Note: Includes matches against Zaire)	14	7	4	3	25	13	+12	CAF
East Germany	5	1	0	4	1	11	−10	UEFA
Egypt	41	18	10	13	47	38	+9	CAF
England	3	0	1	2	2	5	−3	UEFA
Equatorial Guinea	11	7	1	3	17	7	+10	CAF
Ethiopia	8	4	2	2	17	11	+6	CAF
Finland	3	0	1	2	2	6	−4	UEFA
France	5	1	2	2	4	7	−3	UEFA
Gabon	11	4	6	1	21	12	+9	CAF
Gambia	4	1	0	3	3	5	−2	CAF
Georgia	2	0	1	1	1	3	−2	UEFA
Germany (Note: Includes matches against West Germany.)	3	0	2	1	1	4	−3	UEFA
Ghana	18 (Note: The two teams play on January 18, 2000 a training match, three halves of 35 minutes, won by Ghana 2–0 but which can not be considered a real international match.)	4	5	9	20	27	−7	CAF
Guinea	20	9	4	7	31	19	+12	CAF
Guinea-Bissau	1	1	0	0	3	1	+2	CAF
Haiti	1	1	0	0	1	0	+1	CONCACAF
Hungary	4	0	1	3	3	16	−13	UEFA
Iceland	1	1	0	0	3	1	+2	UEFA
India	1	0	1	0	2	2	0	AFC
Iran	3	2	1	0	5	2	+3	AFC
Iraq	11	7	3	1	19	10	+9	AFC
Republic of Ireland	1	0	0	1	0	4	−4	UEFA
Italy	1	0	0	1	0	4	−4	UEFA
Ivory Coast	19	6	6	7	27	29	−2	CAF
Japan	7	1	0	6	3	12	−9	AFC
Jordan	4	3	1	0	15	5	+10	AFC
Kenya	7	5	1	1	10	3	+7	CAF
Kuwait	4	3	0	1	8	4	+4	AFC
Latvia	1	1	0	0	3	0	+3	UEFA
Lebanon	5	3	1	1	9	5	+4	AFC
Liberia	12	7	2	3	21	9	+12	CAF
Libya	29	19	3	7	54	33	+21	CAF
Madagascar	7	6	0	1	12	6	+6	CAF
Malawi	9	4	3	2	19	8	+11	CAF
Mali	16	7	4	5	16	12	+4	CAF
Malta	12	4	4	4	13	9	+4	UEFA
Mauritania	17	11	6	0	30	6	+24	CAF
Mauritius	2	1	1	0	2	0	+2	CAF
Mexico	1	1	0	0	3	1	+2	CONCACAF
Morocco	51	9	28	14	46	55	−9	CAF
Mozambique	3	1	1	1	3	2	+1	CAF
Namibia	6	4	1	1	11	2	+9	CAF
Netherlands	4	0	2	2	4	10	−6	UEFA
New Zealand	1	0	1	0	0	0	0	OFC
Niger	4	4	0	0	9	4	+5	CAF
Nigeria	21	7	7	7	27	22	+5	CAF
Norway	2	0	1	1	1	3	−2	UEFA
Oman	3	1	1	1	3	3	0	AFC
Palestine	3	1	2	0	9	5	+4	AFC
Panama	1	1	0	0	2	1	+1	CONCACAF
Peru	1	0	1	0	1	1	0	CONMEBOL
Poland	4	1	0	3	2	9	−7	UEFA
Portugal	2	0	2	0	3	3	0	UEFA
Qatar	4	2	0	2	8	3	+5	AFC
Romania	1	0	1	0	1	1	0	UEFA
Russia (Note: Includes matches against the Soviet Union.)	2	0	0	2	0	5	−5	UEFA
Rwanda	6	6	0	0	18	3	+15	CAF
São Tomé and Príncipe	2	2	0	0	10	0	+10	CAF
Saudi Arabia	7	3	2	2	7	6	+1	AFC
Senegal	21	9	7	5	22	13	+9	CAF
Serbia (Note: Includes matches against Yugoslavia and Serbia and Montenegro)	6	1	0	5	3	22	−19	UEFA
Seychelles	4	4	0	0	14	0	+14	CAF
Sierra Leone	7	3	3	1	10	6	+4	CAF
Slovenia	2	0	1	1	2	3	−1	UEFA
Somalia	1	1	0	0	2	1	+1	CAF
South Africa	7	3	2	2	9	7	+2	CAF
South Korea	3	1	1	1	1	4	−3	AFC
Spain	2	0	0	2	1	4	−3	UEFA
Sudan	11	8	0	3	28	11	+17	CAF
Sweden	5	1	1	3	3	8	−5	UEFA
Switzerland	3	0	1	2	2	4	−2	UEFA
Eswatini	2	2	0	0	6	0	+6	CAF
Syria	12	5	1	6	16	15	+1	AFC
Tanzania	2	1	1	0	2	1	+1	CAF
Togo	10	7	3	0	19	4	+15	CAF
Turkey	6	0	5	1	4	7	−3	UEFA
Uganda	7	6	1	0	20	3	+17	CAF
Ukraine	1	0	0	1	0	1	−1	UEFA
United Arab Emirates	5	5	0	0	10	1	+9	AFC
United States	1	0	1	0	1	1	0	CONCACAF
Uruguay	1	0	1	0	0	0	0	CONMEBOL
Wales	1	1	0	0	4	0	+4	UEFA
Yemen (Note: Includes matches against North Yemen)	1	1	0	0	2	0	+2	AFC
Zambia	14	9	2	3	24	13	+11	CAF
Zimbabwe	2	1	1	0	5	3	+2	CAF
Total	752	324	210	218	1074	791	+283	—
Last match updated was against Botwana on 28September 2026

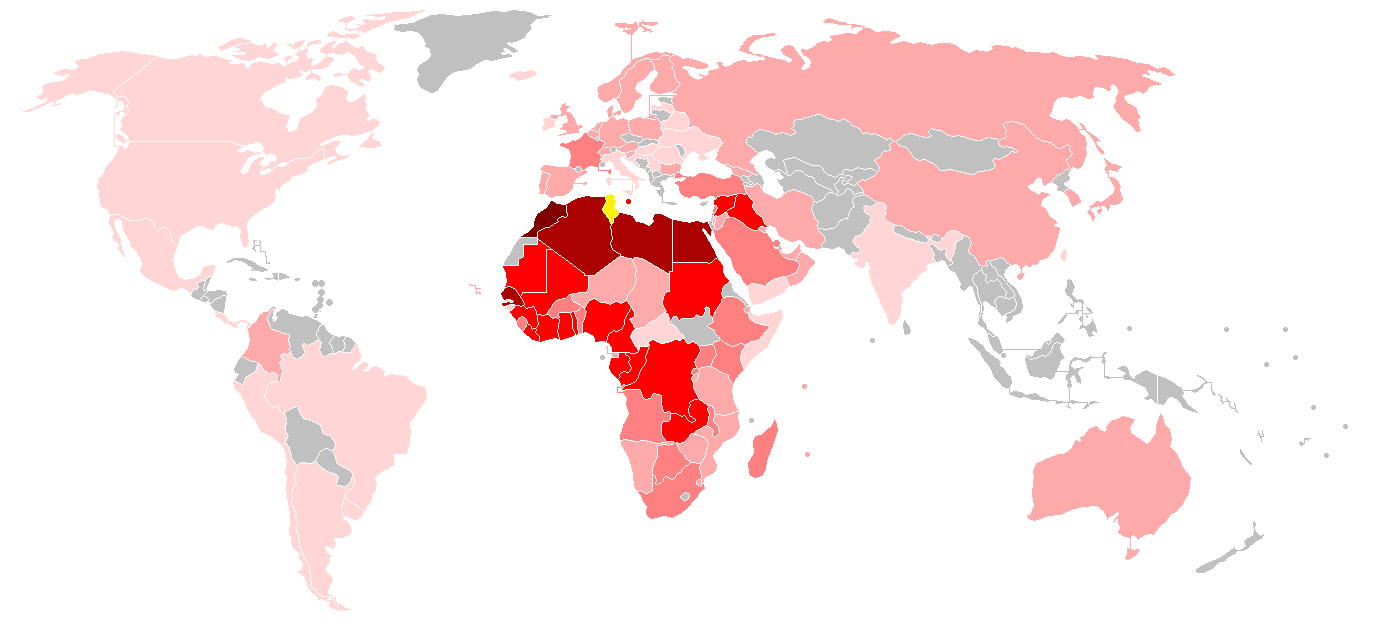
Map of teams played against Tunisia by number of matches: (Note: The map updated after the Tunisia v Tanzania match of 17 November 2020 for the Group J of the 2021 Africa Cup of Nations qualification. The matches against Germany and West Germany are combined.): 1 Match 2–4 Matches / 5–9 Matches 10–20 Matches / 20–49 Matches +50 Matches

== See also ==
- History of the Tunisia national football team
- Tunisia women's national football team results
