= Hanna Hamdi =

Tunisian footballer (born 1995)

Personal information
- Date of birth: 26 November 1995 (age 30)
- Place of birth: Tunis, Tunisia
- Position: Forward

Team information
- Current team: MSV Duisburg

Senior career*
Years	Team	Apps	(Gls)
2012–2013	Borussia Mönchengladbach		
2014–2016	GSV Moers		
2016–2019	SGS Essen		
2019–2023	Borussia Bocholt	3	(2)
2021	→ MSV Duisburg (loan)	1	(0)
2022–2023	→ VfR Warbeyen (loan)		
2023–2024	FSV Gütersloh 2009		
2024–2025	Schalke 04		
2025–	MSV Duisburg		

International career^{‡}
2021–	Tunisia	2	(1)
- * Club domestic league appearances and goals as of 09:55, 29 June 2021 (UTC) ‡ National team caps and goals as of 09:53, 29 June 2021 (UTC)

Hanna Hamdi (Arabic: حنا حمدي; born 26 November 1995) is a Tunisian footballer who plays as a forward for German club MSV Duisburg and the Tunisia women's national team.

== International career ==
Hamdi, who has dual German nationality, made her debut for the Tunisia national team on 10 June 2021, coming on as a substitute for Ella Kaabachi against Jordan. Three days after that, she scored her first goal for Tunisia, also against Jordan.

== Career statistics ==
Scores and results list Tunisia's goal tally first

No.	Date	Venue	Opponent	Score	Result	Competition	Ref.
1	13 June 2021	King Abdullah II Stadium, Amman, Jordan	Jordan	1	2–0	Friendly	

== See also ==
- List of Tunisia women's international footballers
