= History of the Tunisia national football team =

The Tunisia national football team is the national team that represents Tunisia in men's international football, since it played its first match on 2 June 1957 against Libya, which ended with Tunisia winning 4–2. It is a member team of the FIFA internationally and the Confederation of African Football (CAF) on the continent. It is supervised by the Tunisian Football Federation, which was established on 29 March 1957, after Tunisia's independence. Mouin Chaâbani has been coaching the team since 28 July 2026, accompanied by his assistant Mourad Melki. The Tunisian national team is nicknamed the Eagles of Carthage. The team's colours are red and white, similar to the colours of the Tunisian flag, and its symbol is the bald eagle. There have been periods of regular Tunisian representation at the highest international level: from 1962 to 1978, from 1994 to 2008 and again from 2014 onwards. Most of its matches have been played since 2001 at the Hammadi Agrebi Stadium, located in the city of Radès, in the southern suburbs of the capital, Tunis. It has a capacity of 60,000.

The Tunisian national team participated in three major football competitions every four years, appeared in the final stages of seven FIFA World Cups and twenty-two participations in the Africa Cup of Nations, and participated in four editions of the Olympic football tournaments. In the 1978 World Cup in Argentina, when it became the first African and Arab team to win a World Cup match by defeating Mexico 3–1 in Tunisia's first match in the competition, and a negative tie with defending champions West Germany, before being eliminated from the group stage, which led finally to an addition of a second team from Africa in the World Cup. After that, the team qualified for three consecutive tournaments, in 1998, 2002 and 2006 before returning in 2018, 2022 and 2026. Despite participating in several World Cup tournaments, Tunisia has not yet advanced beyond the group stage, nor qualified for the knockout rounds of the Summer Olympics. In terms of rivalry, the Tunisian national football team plays against North African teams such as Egypt, Morocco, and Algeria. In fact, the Tunisian national team played with them many matches, whether through friendly matches, World Cup qualifiers, Africa Cup of Nations, African Nations Championship and African Nations Cup qualifiers. Tunisia is one of the most successful national teams in African competitions, having won the Africa Cup of Nations at home in 2004, after defeating Morocco in the final. It also achieved the final in 1965 as hosts and 1996 in South Africa, and achieved third place in 1962. The Tunisian team also won the African Nations Championship during its first participation in 2011 that was held in Sudan.

The Tunisian national team is fully recognized by all international sports organizations. In 1960, Tunisia joined the FIFA and the CAF, and joined the UAFA in 1978 and the UNAF in 2005. The biggest loss for the Tunisian team was on 24 July 1960 against Hungary, with a score of 10–1, While the biggest victory was on 12 June 2015 against Djibouti with a score of 8–1. Radhi Jaïdi, with 105 international matches, holds the record for the number of matches played by the Tunisian national team. while Issam Jemâa, with 36 goals, is the top scorer in the history of the selection. The highest rank achieved by the team in the FIFA World Rankings was 14th place in April and May 2018, while the lowest rank was 65th in July 2010. On 17 November 2020, after securing qualification for the 2021 Africa Cup of Nations, the Tunisian team became the most successful African team in terms of successive qualifications for the tournament, with seventeen consecutive participations dating back to 1994, breaking the Egyptian team's previous record of fourteen consecutive participations.

== History ==
=== 1928–1956: French protectorate of Tunisia and beginning ===
Before independence, an unofficial team was formed in 1928, comprising the best Tunisian players from the Tunisian League. The team's first match was on 11 March 1928, against the France national football B team; Tunisia lost 8–2. Their next friendlies, against the same team on 23 March 1930 and 26 March 1933, also resulted in heavy defeats: 0–5 and 1–6 respectively. Tunisia had to wait until 1932 for their first match win: a 1–0 victory over French Algeria. Most of the matches that Tunisia played in the 30s and 40s were against French teams, whether it was French Algeria, the French military team or the France B team, in addition to a match against the France national team in 1941. Most of these matches were played at the Stade Vélodrome in Tunis.

The most capped players of this period are: Gustave Ducousso 22 caps(Olympique Béja), Gaetano Chiarenza 21 caps (CS Hammam-Lif), Azzopardi 19 caps (Olympique Béja), Larbi Ben Hassine 16 caps (Espérance de Tunis), Rachid Sehili 16 caps (ES Sahel), Mehl 15 caps (Racing Club), Laâroussi Tsouri 15 caps (Espérance de Tunis), Ben Moussa 15 caps (US Tunis), Alaya Douik 14 caps (ES Sahel), Dara 11 caps (Sporting Club Tunis).

=== 1956–1962: Post independence, First international participation ===
As soon as independence was proclaimed in 1956, Tunisian football leaders took the necessary steps to create an exclusively national body to replace the Tunisian Football League (an offshoot of the French Football Federation). These steps led to the creation of the Tunisian Football Federation (FTF) headed by Chedly Zouiten, which was approved on 29 March 1957. Recognized as a public utility, the FTF has since invested in its dual mission of promoting football and managing the national competition as well as the different teams representing Tunisia in international competitions. In spite of that, Tunisia's national team has been set up before independence.

Tunisian coach Rachid Turki has been appointed as Tunisia's first coach. A friendly match was held two days before independence, and this was in front of the Southwest French team. Tunisia succeeded in winning the match thanks to the goal of Ghariani. The Tunisian squad was the following: Zine el-Abidine Chennoufi, Sadok Dhaou (then Mohieddine Zeghir), Azaiez Jaballah, Driss Messaoud, Hassen Tasco, Abdou Béji, Ali Hannachi « Haj Ali », Amedée Scorsone, Hédi Braïek, Noureddine Diwa, Khemais Ghariani. The Tunisian team also played a match with the Austrian team FC Admira Wacker Mödling on 30 December of the same year and managed to win 4–1 thanks to two goals from both Diwa and Braïek and the Tunisian squad was as follows : Mohamed Bennour (then Houcine El Bez), Youssef Sehili, Azaiez Jaballah, Mokhtar Ben Nacef, Mehrez Jelassi, Abdou Béji, Ali Hannachi « Haj Ali », Abderrahman Ben Ezzedine, Hédi Braïek, Noureddine Diwa (then Khemais Ghariani), Hammadi Henia

Tunisia gained independence from France on 20 March 1956. The Tunisian Football Federation was founded on 29 March 1957 and became affiliated to FIFA and the Confederation of African Football in 1960. The independent Tunisia played their first match against Algeria on 1 June 1957, in the midst of the Algerian War; Tunisia lost 2–1. They played their first official match at the 1957 Pan Arab Games where they won Libya 4–3 after scoring the first Tunisian goal in an official competition by Farzit. They also managed to get through Iraq and Lebanon before losing in the final against Syria 3–1. In 1960, the Yugoslavian Milan Kristić to be the first foreigner to coach the national team so Tunisia qualified for 1960 Summer Olympics which was their first international event after beating Malta, Morocco and Sudan; on 24 July 1960, the team experienced its biggest-ever defeat, losing 10–1 against Hungary. However, less than a month later, on 18 August 1960, Tunisia recorded their biggest-ever win: an 8–1 thumping of Taiwan. As for the Olympic Games, the results were very poor in the first game and despite the opening of the scoring by Kerrit in the third minute, but the Polish team returned in the game and won 6–1. They also lost to Argentina 2–1 before being defeated again, this time against Denmark 3–1.

=== 1962–1978: Golden generation, First participation in the World Cup ===
Frane Matošić was appointed to coach the team as the second Yugoslav coach of the Tunisian team after Kristić led Tunisia to qualify for the Olympics. In 1962, Tunisia entered the African Cup of Nations qualifiers for the first time: the team qualified for the tournament after overcoming Morocco and Nigeria and went on to finish third after beating Uganda in the third-place match. Tunisian federation has appointed French coach André Gérard to train the team to continue contracting with foreign coaches. The team succeeded in crowning the 1963 Arab Cup to be the first championship for the team, after achieving impressive results, including winning over Syria, Jordan, Lebanon and Kuwait.

Tunisia also qualified for the 1963 Africa Cup of Nations despite the exit from the first round. CAF decided that Tunisia would host the 1965 Africa Cup of Nations, despite the fact that only 9 years have passed since the independence of the country, in addition to a distinguished generation of players, most notably Abdelmajid Chetali and Attouga who reached the final after beating Ethiopia 4–0 in the opening match in Stade Chedly Zouiten, but they lost 3–2 to Ghana in extra-time of the final. Despite this early success, Tunisia did not enter the Cup of Nations again until 1976 in Ethiopia, and did not qualify for one until 1978. In 1973, however, the team entered the Palestine Cup of Nations and won in dominant fashion, winning all six of their matches overcoming Syria, Egypt, Palestine, Yemen and Iraq, scoring 19 goals, and conceding only three with the Tunisian coach Ameur Hizem.

In February 1975, after a short experience of the Hungarian coach André Nagy, the coach of ES Sahel, Abdelmajid Chetali was hired. This coincided with the return of the team to the competition in the African Cup of Nations before going out against Sudan before it succeeded to qualify after the absence of 13 years in 1978 after overcoming Egypt and Guinea in qualifying. At the same time, the team was able to qualify for the first time in the FIFA World Cup in 1978 after a remarkable performance in the qualifiers led by a distinguished generation such as Mokhtar Dhouib, Néjib Ghommidh, Raouf Ben Aziza and Tarak Dhiab. They have reserved the only African seat by going to teams such as Morocco, Algeria, Nigeria and Egypt. Before the World Cup, Tunisia competed in the African Cup and won Uganda to find themselves in the semi-finals before losing to hosts Ghana to play third place match with Nigeria. Tunisia initially took the lead, but when Nigeria scored a controversial equalizer in the 42nd minute, the Tunisians walked off the pitch in protest and Nigeria were awarded a 2–0 victory by default. At the World Cup in Argentina, Tunisia made an immediate impact by coming from behind after preparations were not at the desired level after a draw with Hungary 2–2 and a defeat from France 2–0 and another big defeat against Netherlands 4–0.

In the first game, Mexico managed to advance through a penalty in the first half to end the break 1–0 for the Mexico. And before the start of the second half, Tunisian coach Chetali threw the Tunisian flag in front of the players and left the changing room. Tunisia managed to return to the game after Ali Kaabi scored the equalizer for Tunisia to enter history as the first Tunisian player to score a World Cup goal in the 55th minute before adding two goals to finish the game 3–1. In the second match, they made a good performance against Poland before the team lost 1–0, but in the last game it was just around the corner to win the defending champion West Germany before the game ended 0–0. This performance has been admired by most analysts who did not expect it, and that has contributed to increasing the number of African teams qualified for the World Cup to become two. The team was received at Tunis–Carthage International Airport by Tunisians, provided by Tunisian President Habib Bourguiba, telling the players that they had accomplished the task of 50 ambassadors, because they contributed to the known of Tunisia internationally. After this impressive performance, coach Abdelmajid Chetali decided to resign after a remarkable period in which he managed to reach the Tunisian national team to the international level. However, the period that will come after his resignation will be filled with several disturbances that have lasted for years.

=== 1978–1994: Decline and Missing six editions of the AFCON ===
Following their first experience of World Cup football, Tunisia experienced a sudden decline after the passage of Tunisian coaches such as Ameur Hizem and Hmid Dhib who withdrew the team in the World Cup qualifiers in 1982 against Nigeria despite the participation of dozens of players who played the previous edition. Between 1980 and 1992, the team managed to qualify for only two tournaments – the 1982 African Cup of Nations and the 1988 Summer Olympics – and in both they were knocked out in the first round. In fact, Tunisia qualified for the African Cup hosted by neighbor Libya with Polish coach Ryszard Kulesza after being banned in 1980 African Cup but achieved negative results: drew with Cameroon 1–1 in the first game before being defeated against Libya 2–0 and Ghana 1–0 to withdraw by only one point. Kulesza failed also to qualify for the 1984 African Cup after the defeat against Egypt, which precipitated his departure. Coach Youssef Zouaoui was appointed to oversee the team and had a good start by winning friendly matches against Nigeria 5–0 and Canada 2–0 and also surpassed Benin and Guinea in the first rounds of the World Cup qualifiers in 1986. However, he failed to qualify for the 1986 African Cup of Nations after the defeat to the Libyan team, which was strong in that period. But that did not prevent them from reaching the last round of the World Cup qualifiers by beating Nigeria before being defeated in front of Algeria, which qualified for the second time.

The former Cameroon coach Jean Vincent was hired but failed to qualify for the 1988 African Cup in Morocco after defeat against Algeria. He also achieved catastrophic results in the Football at the African Games with defeats against Cameroon, Madagascar and Kenya. He was immediately sacked. Taoufik Ben Othman was appointed who was the former assistant coach of Chetali in the team of 1978 team. The results improved relatively as they qualified for the Olympic Games after surpassing Morocco (thanks to the goal of Tarak Dhiab in the last minute) and Egypt in the qualifiers but Ben Othman was sacked days before the start of the competition after the poor results in the 1988 Arab Cup and the failure to win in their matches against Saudi Arabia, Lebanon, Egypt and Iraq, as well as the bad results in friendly matches against Malta, Finland and East Germany. The Polish coach Antoni Piechniczek was temporarily appointed and supervised the team in the first round of World Cup qualifiers 1990 and also in the finals of the Olympic Games where results were not good after drawing with China 0–0 and Sweden 2–2 and a heavy defeat from West Germany 1–4.

Mokhtar Tlili was appointed coach but the results did not improve by not qualifying for the African Cup in Algeria 1990 after the heavy defeat to Senegal, which precipitated his departure and the arrival of Antoni Piechniczek again and did not succeed in the World Cup qualifiers in 1990 after the defeat in the last round against Cameroon to be contracted with coach Mrad Mahjoub. Although he was unable to qualify for the 1992 African Cup again, the federation renewed confidence in him because of the respectable performance he had given in the qualifiers because the team was eliminated with goal difference to Egypt, in addition to winning Belgium in a friendly match but the early exit from the World Cup qualifiers in 1994 contributed to his dismissal after a draw with Morocco to be replaced by coach Youssef Zouaoui before the 1994 African Cup to be hosted in Tunisia so the team managed to break the streak in 1994 by hosting that year's African Cup of Nations replacing original hosts Zaire, but the result was catastrophic and unexpected with a defeat by Mali 2–0 in the opening game at El Menzah Stadium in front of 45,000, which contributed to the dismissal of Zouaoui after the opening match and compensated by Faouzi Benzarti, who drew with Zaire in the second game finishing bottom of the group.

=== 1994–2002: Beginning of Resurgence, 1996 AFCON runners-up ===
After confirming the decline of the Tunisian football, it was decided to hire a coach who knows the African football well. The former coach of Côte d'Ivoire Henryk Kasperczak was appointed, and the team's results were gradually improved. They managed to qualify for the African Cup for the first time in 14 years through the qualification after overcoming Liberia and Senegal. At the finals of 1996 African Cup of Nations, Tunisia began badly after a draw against Mozambique and a defeat from Ghana, but they finished second in their group, putting them through to the quarter-finals surpassing the first round for the first time since 1978 after winning Côte d'Ivoire 3–1. Tunisia went on to beat Gabon in the quarter-finals and Zambia in the semi-finals 4–2 to reach their first major final in 31 years, but lost to host country South Africa 2–0. This performance was appreciated by the Tunisian fans who did not expect this development in the team led by a new generation, most notably Chokri El Ouaer, Zoubeir Baya and Adel Sellimi. They were also received by President Zine El Abidine Ben Ali at the airport. In that period Tunisia qualified to the 1996 Olympic Games after surpassing Guinea. The team did not rise to what was expected after the defeat from Portugal and the United States with the same result 2–0 in addition to the draw with Argentina 1–1 which eliminated them from the group stage. Still under the leadership of Kasperczak, They qualified for the 1998 Africa Cup of Nations after defeating Guinea and Sierra Leone and qualified for the final quarter in the lead of the group with a win over DR Congo, Togo and defeat from Ghana. In the quarter-final, where they were eliminated in a penalty shootout by host country Burkina Faso. In that period, the team qualified for the second round of World Cup qualifiers after beating Rwanda. Tunisia was placed in the group 2 with Egypt, which was a strong candidate for the qualification, but Tunisia managed to qualify for the 1998 FIFA World Cup for the second time in its history and the first since 20 years after winning Egypt, Liberia and Namibia. The team played some friendly matches before the World Cup with Wales (won 4–0), Austria (lost 1–2) and Chile (lost 2–3). In the finals, they failed to advance from the group stages, losing 2–0 to England and 1–0 to Colombia, and drawing 1–1 with Romania.

Kasperczak was sacked and replaced with the Italian coach Francesco Scoglio, who qualified the team for the 2000 Africa Cup of Nations ideally after winning over Algeria, Uganda and Liberia. Tunisia qualified for the quarter-finals of the competition for the third consecutive time with difficulty after the defeat in the first round of Nigeria and the victory over Congo and draw with Morocco as the team managed to qualify for the semi-final by overcoming Egypt before they lost three to Cameroon and finish the competition in fourth place with a loss from South Africa on penalty shootout. The following year, Scoglio departed to rejoin Genoa CFC, sparking a period of severe instability. The German coach Eckhard Krautzun, was appointed and qualified the team to the 2000 Africa Cup of Nations with difficulty with a group that includes Morocco, Gabon and Kenya, he Succeeded to lead the team to the World Cup in South Korea and Japan for the third time in its history with a difficult group, including Côte d'Ivoire and the DR Congo. Krautsen was sacked surprisingly despite the good results after a sharp dispute with the Tunisian Football Federation officials. Henri Michel replaced him, but was sacked when Tunisia crashed out of the 2002 African Cup of Nations without scoring a single goal after a draw with Senegal and Zambia and defeat from Egypt. Finally, Ammar Souayah took over in time for the 2002 World Cup; The team drew in friendly matches with Norway and South Korea and were defeated by Denmark and Slovenia. In the finals, Tunisia could not do better than 1998 performance, drawing 1–1 with Belgium but losing 2–0 to Russia and co-hosts Japan making the federation look for a big coach before the start of the 2004 African Cup hosted by Tunisia.

=== 2002–2008: Roger Lemerre era, 2004 AFCON champions ===
Before the arrival of a new coach preparing the team for the upcoming African Cup, which will be held in Tunisia, the team drew 1–1 against France at Stade 7 November. The list of Tunisia's new coaches included Artur Jorge, Vahid Halilhodžić, Gilbert Gress, and Philippe Troussier. In September 2002, the Tunisian Football Federation announced that it was finalizing a contract with Roger Lemerre, the former coach of France. On 25 September 2002, the Tunisian Football Federation confirmed Lemerre as the country's new head coach. Lemerre coached his first match against Egypt on 20 November 2002.

As hosts, Tunisia did not have to qualify for the 2004 African Cup of Nations, where they face DR Congo, Rwanda and Guinea in the first round. The team won his opening match against Rwanda 2–1, thanks to goals from Ziad Jaziri and Francileudo Santos, despite the expulsion of Selim Benachour in the 60th minute with a red card. The second match against DR Congo is difficult until the Congolese Lomana LuaLua is sent off with a red card in the first half, after a frank attack on Jawhar Mnari. Thanks to Hatem Trabelsi on the right flank, the team managed to win the match 3–0 with a double from Dos Santos in the 55th and 87th minutes and a goal by Najeh Braham in the 65th minute. On the day of the third match, corresponding to eid al-Adha, 35,000 spectators came to the stadium. Guinea managed to snatch the equalizing point after the end of the game with the score at 1–1, Benachour scoring Tunisia's goal in the 58th minute, followed by a Guinean goal from Titi Camara in the last minutes of the match. Tunisia qualified for the quarter-finals on top of the group with seven points, after two wins and a draw. In the quarter-finals, Senegal who had already beaten Lemerre as France coach 1–0 in the 2002 World Cup, faced him; Tunisia also won this game 1–0, with Mnari scoring in the second half after a scissor kick from Jaziri; this match is notorious for the appearance of fog on the pitch. In the semi-finals, Nigeria which had eliminated Cameroon. The match becomes very even until the end of playing time 1–1. The first goal was scored by Nigerian Jay-Jay Okocha, who scored a penalty after Tunisian defender Karim Haggui beat Nwankwo Kanu in the penalty area. Fifteen minutes later, Nigerian defender Seyi Olofinjana broke Tunisian striker Jaziri in the penalty area, with whom Tunisia also received a penalty. The Tunisian captain Khaled Badra equalized the score 1–1. The match is finally decided in the penalty shootout, which Tunisia wins 5–3 thanks to Haggui who takes the last shot. With the victory. Tunisia reached the final, where they faced Morocco.

During the final, on 14 February 2004 at Stade 7 November in Radès in front of 70,000 supporters, Tunisia got off to a good start with a lead 1–0 after four minutes with Mehdi Nafti centered on Dos Santos, who scored his fourth goal of the tournament. At the end of the first half, Morocco came back to score with a goal from Youssouf Hadji on a lift from Youssef Mokhtari. Seven minutes passed in the second half before another Tunisian striker, Jaziri gave his country the lead. The match finally ends with the score of 2–1, giving Tunisia their first Africa Cup of Nations title. Khaled Badra and Riadh Bouazizi lifted the trophy after receiving it from President Zine El Abidine Ben Ali. The Carthage Eagles are the 13th selection in history to be crowned African champions. Roger Lemerre also becomes the first coach to win two different continental tournaments after having previously won Euro 2000 with France. The national team also wins the African National Team of the Year award from the Confederation of African Football. The victory gave rise to the team's nickname, the "Eagles of Carthage" and as a result the team's badge was changed to incorporate an eagle.

The Tunisian team, winning their first African Cup of Nations title, enabled them to qualify for the 2005 FIFA Confederations Cup in Germany, where they participated in a tough group including hosts Germany, Argentina and Australia. The opening match of this tournament was between Tunisia and Argentina, Tunisia lost by a narrow margin 1–2. In the second match, the Tunisians resisted until the 74th minute, where they conceded three goals from the German team to end the match, while in the third match they managed to beat Australia 2–0, to leave good impressions. In the same year, the Tunisian national team played the World Cup qualifiers in 2006, and succeeded in overcoming Guinea (lost 2–1, win 2–0), Kenya (win 1–0, win 0–2), Malawi (draw 2–2, win 7–0), Botswana (win 4–1, win 1–3) and finally Morocco, which attracted them to a 2–2 draw in the last round at the Stade 7 November in front of 60,000 spectators, which enabled the Tunisian team to qualify for the fourth World in its history and the third in a row. This confirmed the Tunisian domination of the continent, after the absence of all the big African teams, and Tunisia became the only African team qualified for the 2006 World Cup, and which it had previously been in. The following year, they failed to defend their title, losing to Nigeria in the quarter-finals on penalties, despite a perfect start in the group stage after beating Zambia 4–1 and South Africa 2–0. Preparations for the World Cup began as early as the team lost against Serbia and Montenegro on 1 March 2006. The Federation also announced at the end of this month that it will hold a small tournament before the World Cup, an edition of the LG Cup, which will be attended by Belarus, Libya and Uruguay. In May, Lemerre took his team to a training camp in Switzerland, where they played international friendlies against Swiss clubs.

The 2006 FIFA World Cup kicked off, the first match being on 14 June against Saudi Arabia. While Tunisia advanced with a goal by Ziad Jaziri, Saudi Arabia managed to return and scored two goals, but in the last moments of the match, Tunisia managed to end the match with a 2–2 draw with a fatal goal by Radhi Jaïdi, Lemerre was disappointed with the result. In the second match, Tunisia faced Spain led by Raul Gonzalez, Iker Casillas, Carles Puyol and Sergio Ramos. Tunisia started the match strongly and scored the first goal, signed by Jawhar Mnari. However, Spain made offensive changes in the second half, and Raul Gonzalez and his colleagues counterattacked goalkeeper Ali Boumnijel, who scored the equalizer five minutes later, Fernando Torres scored the second goal for Spain, and finally in the 90th minute, a penalty kick ended the match with a score of 3–1. Lemerre also emphasized that Tunisia must win the last match against Ukraine to qualify to the Round of 16. Against Ukraine. In the match, the referee announced a suspected penalty kick scored by Andriy Shevchenko. The match eventually ended with a score of 1–0, Tunisia were again eliminated from the group stage. Tunisian media and supporters criticized Lemerre's performance during the tournament.

At that time, Hatem Trabelsi announced his retirement from international football after 8 years, Lemerre carried on his contract until the end, as he led Tunisia to qualify for the 2008 African Cup of Nations. In the qualification Tunisia faced Mauritius, Sudan, and Seychelles. After 4 wins and 1 draw, Tunisia suffered a 3–2 loss against Sudan and finished second in the qualifying round. Despite this, Tunisia were among the favorite teams to win the cup after its outstanding performance in recent years in addition to the presence of 7 players from Étoile du Sahel, champions of CAF Champions League, and Tunisia was able to qualify for the quarter-finals. Tunisia finished at the top of the group after a draw in the opening match against Senegal 2–2, a 3–1 victory over South Africa, In the third match, it faced Angola and the match ended 0–0. They lost against Cameroon 3–2 in extra time. After the competition, it was announced that Lemerre would continue as Tunisia's coach until the end of June. Preparations for the qualifying matches began in March by winning an against Ivory Coast 2–0. Before the start of the qualifiers, the Tunisian Football Federation negotiated with Bertrand Marchand and Jacques Santini, but neither of them was able to reach the agreement they wanted with the Tunisian Football Federation. Instead, Portuguese Humberto Coelho was appointed as the new coach on 3 June 2008. Prior to his appointment, Lemerre led Tunisia for the last time in the fourth World Cup qualifier match against Burundi, which ended in a 2–1 win. On 30 June 2008, Roger Lemerre leaves Tunisia Six years later, the longest training period in the history of the Tunisian national team.

=== 2008–2014: Disappointments and missing the World Cup ===
Coelho took charge of coaching after Roger Lemerre left the national team on 30 June 2008. The qualifiers continued in September under Coelho's 0–0 draw against Burkina Faso and a large victory against Seychelles 5–0. The match paved the way for Tunisia to the third qualifying round in Group B. In the draw, Tunisia faces Nigeria, Mozambique and Kenya. Before the start of the qualifiers, Tunisia lost in a friendly match against France 1–3, and achieved a surprising 1–1 draw against the Netherlands. On 28 March 2009, Tunisia opened the qualifiers with a 1–2 victory in their opening match against Kenya. With the next qualifying match in June, Coelho played a friendly match against Sudan ended with winning 4–0 at home. Tunisia played its second qualifying match against Mozambique. The match ended with a second 2–0 victory. The third match was played on 20 June 2009 against Nigeria. Tunisia topped its group after two rounds with a full score, while Nigeria collected only four points. The match ended 0–0. The second leg of the qualifiers continued after in September. In the meantime, Tunisia played a friendly match against Ivory Coast ended 0–0. After that, the fourth qualifier match was played in Abuja. In the last minute, Darragi scored the equalizer and the match ended 2–2.

On 11 October 2009, Tunisia faced Kenya and scored after one minute at the Stade 7 November. A few days later, Tunisia lost to Saudi Arabia surprisingly. The final round of qualifying took place in November. For Tunisia, at least a draw was enough to qualify for the World Cup. but they lost the last and decisive match in the 83rd minute. So, Tunisia failed to be in the 2010 FIFA World Cup, but qualified for the 2010 Africa Cup of Nations. Four days later, the Tunisian Football Federation sacked coach Humberto Coelho and at the same time appointed Faouzi Benzarti as the new coach to oversee the national team in the 2010 Africa Cup of Nations. He was also eliminated after Tunisia were eliminated from the group stage, where all three matches were tied against Zambia, Gabon and Cameroon. Ending the session at the bottom of the group.

In June 2010, Bertrand Marchand was appointed coach for a two-year contract, with the aim of reaching the semi-finals of the 2012 Africa Cup of Nations, especially after the excellent results he achieved with Étoile Sportive du Sahel at the African and international levels. However, qualifying started poorly, losing two defeats to Botswana and a 2–2 draw against Malawi after beating Togo 1–2, stunning again against Botswana 1–0 which put the Tunisian team 65th in the FIFA World Rankings, the worst in its history . On 15 December 2010, after a meeting of the Federal Bureau, Bertrand Marchand was removed from his post. In 2011, Tunisia was marked by political events and a new coach, Sami Trabelsi, was appointed. At the same time, CAF created a new tournament, especially for local national teams. Tunisia played the qualification against Morocco and qualified. Without preparation, the team is flying for the 2011 African Nations Championship. and finished at the top of the group after a 1–1 draw against Angola, a 3–1 victory against Rwanda and another 2–0 victory against Senegal, In the quarter-finals, they won the defending champions DR Congo and in the semi-finals, Tunisia won Algeria on penalties. In the final match, they won Angola easily 3–0. But the Eagles of Carthage lost to Oman on 29 March, 2–1 in a friendly match. On 8 October, the team qualified for the 2012 Africa Cup of Nations by defeating Togo 2–0. After a good start, with wins against Morocco 2–1 and Niger, two goals from Youssef Msakni, and a 0–1 fall against host country Gabon. Tunisia is eliminated in the quarter-finals after extra games against Ghana 1–2. On 29 February 2012, they tied against Peru 1–1, then on 29 May, they won against Rwanda 5–1. In the 2014 World Cup qualifications, Tunisia fall into a group comprising Cape Verde, Equatorial Guinea and Sierra Leone; 3–1 to beat Equatorial Guinea 3–1 and Cape Verde 2–1.

And then qualified on 13 October 2013 Africa Cup of Nations despite two draws against Sierra Leone 2–2 and 0–0. In the first match, Tunisia snatched victory in the last moments 1–0 against Algeria, the best goal in the 2013 edition by Youssef Msakni. Then Tunisia were crushed by Ivory Coast 3–0. The last match ended with a 1–1 draw against Togo. In February 2013, Nabil Maâloul replaced Sami Trabelsi. In their first two 2014 FIFA World Cup qualifications, Tunisia beat Sierra Leone 2–1 and clinched a 2–2 draw in Freetown. On 16 June, during the fifth round of the group stage, Tunisia tied 1–1 against Equatorial Guinea. On 7 September, the team was defeated at home by Cape Verde 0–2 and loses all hope of being qualified for the World Cup. Nabil Maâloul announces his resignation. On 12 September, however, FIFA qualifies Tunisia after Cape Verde is disqualified for cheating. In the wake of the 2014 World Cup qualifiers, the Eagles of Carthage face Cameroon, Tunisia give a 0–0 draw at home and fail at home to Cameroon 4–1, thus losing their qualifications. Coach Ruud Krol leaves after only two games.

=== 2014–2022: Renaissance and two participation in the World Cup ===
Belgian coach Georges Leekens was appointed in early 2014 to try and revive the team's fortunes. Early results were positive, including a 1–1 draw against Colombia and a 1–0 win over South Korea, both in friendly matches. Under Leekens, the team climbed from 49th to 22nd in few months in the FIFA rankings so the team regained its continental luster after the emergence of a new generation of players. Tunisia qualified for the 2015 African Cup of Nations and finished top of their strong group including Senegal, Egypt and Botswana. At the finals of the tournament, Tunisia finished top of their group for the first time since 2008 winning Zambia 2–1 and drawing with Cape Verde and DR Congo with the same result 1–1 but were eliminated in the quarter-finals after a controversial 2–1 defeat to the host Equatorial Guinea making CAF banned the referee Rajindraparsad Seechurn for six months for his "poor performance" at the tournament. In June 2015, Leekens resigned surprisingly for security reasons after he restored the glamor of the team.

In July 2015, Henryk Kasperczak returned as coach after 17 years. He managed to qualify the team for the 2017 African Cup in the lead with victory over Liberia, Togo and Djibouti. He reached also the quarter-finals of the competition after beating Algeria and Zimbabwe 4–2 before losing again in this round, this time against Burkina Faso 2–0. The defeats in friendly matches against Cameroon and Morocco with the same result 1–0 led to the dismissal of Kasperczak. On 27 April 2017, Nabil Maâloul returned as coach despite the disapproval of the Tunisian supporters following the failure at the 2014 World Cup qualifiers, but this time he qualified Tunisia for the 2018 FIFA World Cup in Russia for the fifth time in the history of Tunisia and the first since 12 years after winning against DR Congo 2–1 and 2–2 Guinea 2–0 and 4–1 and Libya 1–0 and 0–0 in the qualification. Tunisia's qualification for the 2018 FIFA World Cup and its positive results in the friendlies against Iran and Costa Rica led to its rise to 14th place in the FIFA World Rankings for the first time ever, after being first in African teams and surpassing teams like Italy and Netherlands. The team also continued its good results before the World Cup, with a draw with Turkey and Portugal, with the same score 2–2, in addition to a difficult defeat against Spain 1–0 in the 85th minute. Despite this, in the World Cup, the performance of the team did not rise to the expected level, and was once again eliminated from the group stage.

The first match against England, the two teams had met at the 1998 FIFA World Cup. England scored by Harry Kane. After 10 minutes, Tunisia equalized from a penalty kick. In the additional time, Kane scored the second goal of his team. The second match against Belgium, the two teams had faced each other at the 2002 FIFA World Cup. The match ended 5–2 for Belgium and Tunisia has registered their worst defeat ever in their World Cup history. The last game against Panama, the two teams had never met before. Tunisia won 2–1, which was the first victory after 40 years, since their 3–1 victory over Mexico in 1978. Because of this dismal performance, Tunisian squad was heavily criticized for its unpromising performance and the team's dubious record in World Cup, and fell out of top 20 teams on FIFA ranking.

The team went through a short experience with Faouzi Benzarti, who managed to qualify for the 2019 Africa Cup of Nations surpassing Egypt, Niger and Eswatini before being fired due to problems between him and the president of the Tunisian Football Federation Wadie Jary. In December 2018, French coach Alain Giresse was hired to oversee the team at the 2019 AFCON finals due to his experience in African football and his outstanding record as a player with the France national team. Despite the good results in friendly matches by defeating World Cup finalist Croatia 2–1, the start of the competition was poor after three draws in the group stage against Angola, Mali, and Mauritania to qualify for the Round 16 with great difficulty in second place. In the next round, the results improved by beating Ghana, and Madagascar 3–0 to qualify for the semi-finals for the first time in 15 years when Tunisia won the AFCON in 2004 before they narrowly lost to Senegal 1–0 in extra time after a referee dispute of Bamlak Tessema because of not giving a clear penalty to Tunisia 4 minutes before the end of the game to complete the competition in fourth place behind Nigeria. Nonetheless, it stands as the best performance of Tunisia since winning 2004 AFCON at home.

After the 2019 Africa Cup of Nations, Alain Giresse gives up and the Tunisian Mondher Kebaier is called on 27 August 2019 to supervise the team. Preparations for the 2021 Africa Cup of Nations qualification begin, with several friendlies being played, a victory 1–0 against Mauritania, a loss 2–1 against Ivory Coast and a draw against Cameroon. Meanwhile, Tunisia plays the for 2020 African Nations Championship qualification against Libya and won 1–0 then 2–1. But, the Tunisian Football Federation withdrew due to schedule pressure. The 2021 Africa Cup of Nations qualification are drawn, with Tunisia facing Libya, Equatorial Guinea and Tanzania. The first match against Libya ended with a large victory 4–1, and another away victory against Equatorial Guinea with a goal of Khazri. Meanwhile, the 2022 FIFA World Cup qualification draw takes place and Tunisia draws again with Equatorial Guinea, Mauritania and Zambia. After almost a year of hiatus due to the COVID-19 pandemic, the national team resumes and plays two friendlies to prepare for the remainder of the 2021 Africa Cup of Nations qualification against Sudan 3–0 victory and Nigeria 1–1 draw. During the qualifiers, the Tunisian team plays four games to play, against Tanzania, 1–0 victory then 1–1 draw, in addition to a large victory over Libya in Benghazi 5–2 and a victory over Equatorial Guinea 2–1; the team ended at the top of the group with five wins and one draw. After two months, the team plays three more friendlies, with a victory 1–0 over the DR Congo, a home loss against Algeria 0–2 and a victory over Mali 1–0.

In September 2021, the national team began its matches during the 2022 FIFA World Cup qualification with three consecutive victories against Equatorial Guinea 3–0, against Zambia in Ndola 2–0 and against Mauritania 3–0, followed by a draw against Mauritania in Nouakchott 0–0 and a loss against Equatorial Guinea in Malabo 0–1, which leads to strong criticism from the supporters, the qualification for the play-offs is obtained after a victory against Zambia 3–1, concluding with four wins, a draw and a loss. In the meantime, Qatar hosted the 2021 FIFA Arab Cup. Tunisia qualified directly, due to the FIFA World Rankings. Tunisia started with a large victory 5–1 against Mauritania. Then, the team suffered an unexpected defeat to Syria, before beating the United Arab Emirates 1–0. In the quarter-finals, the team improved and beat Oman 2–1. In the semi-final, Tunisia collided with their rival Egypt, after a close match, Tunisia managed to score a goal in the 95th minute. The victory allows Tunisia to reach its first FIFA final in the country's history. In the final match, the Tunisian national team faced Algeria, but were beaten 0–2 in overtime. Despite the loss of the title, the team's performance has restored confidence to the supporters. In this context, they are congratulated by FIFA and named as the best supporters of the tournament.

The team's participation in the 2021 Africa Cup of Nations was rather bad. In the group stage, it began with a 0–1 defeat from Mali during the match, which witnessed strange refereeing events, as Zambian referee Janny Sikazwe ended the match in the 85th minute. In the second match, the team achieved a moral victory over Mauritania 4–0 thanks to the double of Wahbi Khazri and the goals of Hamza Mathlouthi and Seifeddine Jaziri, but the team was afflicted by a 0–1 defeat against Gambia in the last moments of the match, to qualify for the round of 16 as the best third in the group stage. Nevertheless, the team defeated strong Nigeria 1–0 with the goal of Youssef Msakni from outside the penalty area, despite the absence of Mondher Kebaier from the match due to his infection with the COVID-19 virus, and he was replaced by his assistant Jalel Kadri. In the end, the team was eliminated from the quarter–finals against Burkina Faso after a 0–1 defeat. After this disappointing participation, Mondher Kebaier was dismissed from coaching the national team three years after his appointment and the appointment of his assistant Jalel Kadri. as his successor. Meanwhile, the draw for the third round of the African 2022 FIFA World Cup qualification was held, as it resulted in a home–and–forth match against Mali. In the first leg match at the Stade du 26 Mars in Bamako, Tunisia won out of the rules 1–0 thanks to Mali's Moussa Sissako's own goal after pressure from Youssef Msakni, As for the return match at the Stade Hammadi Agrebi in front of 50,000 spectators, it ended in a 0–0 draw, so that the Tunisian team qualified for the FIFA World Cup for the sixth time in its history.

Preparations start early, as the team plays two matches for the 2023 Africa Cup of Nations qualification, the first against Equatorial Guinea in Radès 4–0 victory and the second against Botswana in Francistown draw 0–0. Subsequently, the team is set to play the 2022 Kirin Cup Soccer in Japan from 10 to 14 June 2022, with the participation of three other teams: Japan, Chile and Ghana. In the semi-finals, Tunisia beat Chile 2–0 and then Japan 3–0 and thus won the title for the first time. Ferjani Sassi was named the tournament's best player, while his compatriot Issam Jebali finished top scorer with two goals. After that, the team played two friendlies: the first against Comoros, which ended in victory 1–0, and the second which ended in a heavy loss against Brazil 5–1. The Carthage Eagles end their preparations with a victory against Iran with a score of 2–0 a few days before the world cup, the match not being broadcast and taking place behind closed doors at the request of the Iranian federation.

In the first match in Group D, Mohamed Dräger threatens the opponent's goal, then Issam Jebali dominates Kasper Schmeichel, but the situation is prevented by an offside. In the 43rd minute, Jebali comes face to face with Schmeichel after hitting the goal and tries to beat the goalkeeper with a through shot, but he uses his thumbs and fends off the finish. Christian Eriksen then makes an attempt beyond the goal line, but Aymen Dahmen is illustrated with a save. From the corner that follows, Andreas Cornelius wastes an opportunity by finding himself alone at the far post, but his header only seals the structure of the goals. Due to the subsequent dominance over the ball, despite their best efforts, the Danes could not find a solution against the Tunisia defence, and the match ended in a goalless draw. Thanks to his performance in this match, Aïssa Laïdouni receives the man of the match award. In the second match, the team are led to a 1–0 loss against Australia, with the technical framework and the players receiving criticism due to the weakness of the midfield and the attack, which reduces the chances of Tunisia to qualify for the round of 16. In the final game against world champions France, Wahbi Khazri put Tunisia ahead in the 58th minute with a low shot to the bottom right corner. At this stage, Tunisia is in a position to qualify in the group. However, two minutes later, Australia took the lead against Denmark in the other match, which sent Tunisia out of the knockout stage. Captain Khazri wins the Man of the Match award. This is Tunisia's first victory against a European team in the World Cup, and the team have collected the most points (four points) in the group stage since their first appearance in 1978 FIFA World Cup (three points). In this context, Wahbi Khazri is retiring from international retirement, after 74 games in which he scored 25 goals.

=== 2023–present: Difficulties and temporary decline ===
After his exclusion from the World Cup, Kadri submitted his resignation, but the Federal Bureau refused and extended his contract until 2024. The team finished the 2023 Africa Cup of Nations qualification at the top of the group after beating Libya in the first leg 3–0 and the return leg 1–0 in Benghazi, Botswana 3–0 and a defeat against Equatorial Guinea 0–1 in Malabo. The team's performances began to decline, especially after the president of the Tunisian Football Federation, Wadie Jary, was imprisoned after accusations of financial corruption were proven. The team drew a friendly against Algeria 1–1 in Annaba and won against Egypt 3–1 in Cairo. In East Asia, the team suffered two defeats against South Korea 0–4 in Seoul and Japan 0–2 in Kobe. On 17 November 2023, the national team started the 2026 FIFA World Cup qualification with two victories against São Tomé and Príncipe 4–0 and Malawi 1–0 in Lilongwe. Tunisia was drawn for the AFCON alongside Mali, Namibia and South Africa. In preparation for the competition, the team played two friendly matches in Radès, a draw against Mauritania 0–0 and a victory against Cape Verde 2–0.

In the first match, the team tried in vain to overcome the constant pressure from Namibia. At the end of the second half, two minutes before the end of regulation time, Bethuel Muzeu sent a cross from midfield to striker Deon Hotto, who scored a vertical goal that Bechir Ben Saïd could not block, so the match ended in a 0–1 defeat. Against Mali, the Tunisians fell behind after a goal by Lassine Sinayoko on a pass from Kamory Doumbia. Just ten minutes after Mali opened the scoring, Ali Abdi produced a point and a back pass for Hamza Rafia to equalise, which proved to be the final score of the match. In the last match against South Africa, Tunisia was too timid while South Africa was too reluctant to make convincing efforts while holding the advantage. However, as the match became increasingly difficult, the Tunisians almost fell into the traps of the South African counterattack, including a missed effort by Sphephelo Sithole. Despite an attempt at goal by Haythem Jouini, the match ended goalless, eliminating Tunisia from the group stage for the first time since the 2013 edition. In this context, the coach submitted his resignation two years after taking office.

Three days later, the entire technical staff was dismissed, while Anis Boussaïdi and Montasser Louhichi were appointed to act as interim managers. On 30 January the federation published a notice announcing the opening of applications in a context of controversy. In this context, the team lost thirteen places, which made it fall to 41st place in the FIFA world ranking, the worst drop since April 2011. In March, the team participated in the Egyptian Capital Cup, a friendly tournament affiliated with the 2024 FIFA Series. Under Louhichi's leadership, the team played in the semi-final against Croatia and, after a 0–0 draw, lost on penalties 4–5. In the third-place match, the team faced New Zealand; the match also ended in a goalless draw, which ended with a 4–2 penalty shootout victory and a third-place finish for Tunisia. Louhichi continued to lead the team in the third and fourth rounds of the World Cup qualifiers. The team won narrowly against Equatorial Guinea in Radès thanks to a goal from Mohamed Ali Ben Romdhane on a penalty and a goalless draw against Namibia in Johannesburg.

On 14 June, Faouzi Benzarti was appointed coach for the fourth time, to take office on 1 July, with Mehdi Nafti as assistant coach. The draw for the 2025 Africa Cup of Nations qualification took place on 4 July. Tunisia was in Group A with Madagascar, Comoros and Gambia. On 23 July, FIFA decided to create a normalization committee within the Tunisian Football Federation and Kamel Idir was asked to lead it. However, Nafti was dismissed from his duties and replaced by Kais Yaâkoubi for disciplinary reasons. On 5 September, the team began the qualifiers with a difficult victory in Radès against Madagascar 1–0, thanks to a goal by Ferjani Sassi in the 98th minute, then a victory three days later against Gambia in El Jadida, Morocco 2–1 with a double by Ali Abdi and Ben Romdhane. On the third matchday, Tunisia was shocked by a surprise defeat against the Comoros in Radès 1–0 with a poor performance. In the return match, played in Abidjan against the same opponent, Tunisia was behind until Yassine Meriah equalized in the 69th minute, ending the match 1–1. The team received strong criticism due to poor choices in the technical framework and the lack of discipline on the part of the players. After that, Benzarti threatened to resign, but the normalization committee refused, before changing his mind on 22 October by mutual agreement with Benzarti. In this context, the team lost eleven places in the FIFA world rankings, falling to 47th place, which is the biggest drop recorded in October 2024 on a global scale.

On 5 October, Kais Yaâkoubi was appointed interim coach for the last two matches of the qualifiers. On 14 November, during the penultimate day, Tunisia successfully played the return match against Madagascar in Pretoria 3–2, thus qualifying for the final phase of the 2025 Africa Cup of Nations thanks to goals from Hamza Rafia, Sayfallah Ltaief and Ali Abdi. In the last match, the team suffered a new defeat in Radès, this time against Gambia 0–1. Tunisia finished the qualifiers in second place in the group behind the Comoros with three wins, one draw and two losses. This is the first time since the 2012 qualification that Tunisia has qualified for the AFCON in second place. This causes it to fall again in the FIFA world rankings and finish in 52nd place in November 2024. In early January 2025, the normalization committee attempted to conclude a contract with Portuguese coach Carlos Queiroz, who had come to Tunisia to negotiate the deal. Despite his financial concessions, the deal fell through after the authorities intervened due to the large amount of the contract, estimated at 500,000 dinars per month. On 25 January, Moez Nasri was elected the new president of the federation. Two days later, the draw for the 2025 Africa Cup of Nations took place in Rabat, with Tunisia placed in the second pot and drawn into Group C alongside Nigeria, Uganda and Tanzania. On 1 February, Ziad Jaziri was appointed sporting director with the assistance of Khalil Chemmam and the task of proposing names for the position of coach to the federal office.

On 10 February, the federation announced the return of Sami Trabelsi as the team's coach, twelve years after his departure. He faced his first serious test on 19 and 24 March, in the fifth and sixth rounds of the 2026 World Cup qualification, where the team under his leadership won two victories against Liberia 1–0 thanks to a goal from Hazem Mastouri and Malawi 2–0, with goals from Seifeddine Jaziri and Elias Achouri. On 26 April, the team was called to participate in the 2025 FIFA Arab Cup. In June, the team played two friendly matches, with a victory 2–0 against Burkina Faso and a defeat 0–2 against Morocco, while the third match scheduled against the Central African Republic was canceled. In September, the team returned to the qualifiers and beat Liberia in Radès 3–0 with goals from Hazem Mastouri, Ferjani Sassi and Elias Saad. On 8 September, Tunisia qualified for the World Cup for the seventh time in its history after beating Equatorial Guinea 1–0 in Malabo, thanks to a goal from Ben Romdhane in the 90+4 minute.

Aymen Dahmen's three clean saves were crucial for the team's qualification. In October, the team played the final two qualifying matches, both in Radès, where Tunisia defeated São Tomé and Príncipe 6–0 thanks to braces from Saad and Ben Romdhane and goals from Ismaël Gharbi and Firas Chaouat, and Namibia 3–0 thanks to goals from Abdi, Hannibal Mejbri, and Sassi. Tunisia finished the qualifiers top of their group, collecting 28 points with nine wins and one draw. The team scored 22 goals, becoming the first team in history to reach the World Cup without conceding a single goal. In November, Trabelsi called up an extended squad of 35 local and professional players for three friendly matches. In Radès, the team drew 1–1 against Mauritania, won a hard-fought 3–2 victory against Jordan, 2023 Asian Cup runners-ups, and achieved a historic 1–1 draw in Lille, France, against Brazil, with Mestouri scoring Tunisia's only goal.

On 21 November, Trabelsi unveiled the list of players selected for the 2025 FIFA Arab Cup, despite the absence of the biggest names playing in Europe, whose clubs had refused to release them. In the opening match, despite dominating the first half, the team suffered a 1–0 defeat against Syria. In the second match against Palestine, Tunisia opened the scoring through Amor Layouni in the 16th minute, and Chaouat added a second goal in the 51st minute. However, Palestine managed to reduce the deficit in the 61st minute before equalizing in the 85th minute, thus sealing a 2–2 draw. In their third match, the Tunisian team defeated Qatar, the host country and the 2023 AFC Asian Cup champions. Tunisia opened the scoring in the 16th minute through Ben Romdhane, with Yassine Meriah doubling the lead in the 62nd minute, and Mohamed Ben Ali adding a third goal four minutes after the end of regulation time, sealing a 3–0 victory. The draw between Syria and Palestine resulted in Tunisia's elimination from the group stage. The draw for the 2026 World Cup places Tunisia in Group F alongside the Netherlands, Japan and the UEFA Path B winner.

On 11 December, Trabelsi announced the squad selected for the 2025 Africa Cup of Nations in Morocco. The team began a training camp at Cigale Tabarka Sport in Tabarka and won a friendly match against Botswana 2–1. For their first group match, Tunisia started their campaign with a 3–1 victory against Uganda at the Rabat Olympic Stadium in Rabat. Tunisia won their first AFCON match for the first time since 2013. In their second match against Nigeria, at the Fez Stadium, the Tunisian team delivered a disappointing performance and the match ended in a 3–2 defeat. The third match against Tanzania, at the Olympic Stadium in Rabat, was Tunisia's first encounter against this country in the Africa Cup of Nations. It ended in a 1–1 draw, and Tunisia qualified for the round of 16 by finishing second in their group. The round of 16 match against Mali ended in a 1–1 draw, forcing a penalty shootout which Mali won after their players missed three penalties, thus eliminating Tunisia from the round of 16. On 4 January 2026, the federation announced the termination of Sami Trabelsi's contract and the dismissal of the entire technical staff.

On 14 January 2026, the Tunisian Football Federation announced an agreement with Sabri Lamouchi to coach the team on a contract extending until 31 July 2028.

== Home stadium ==
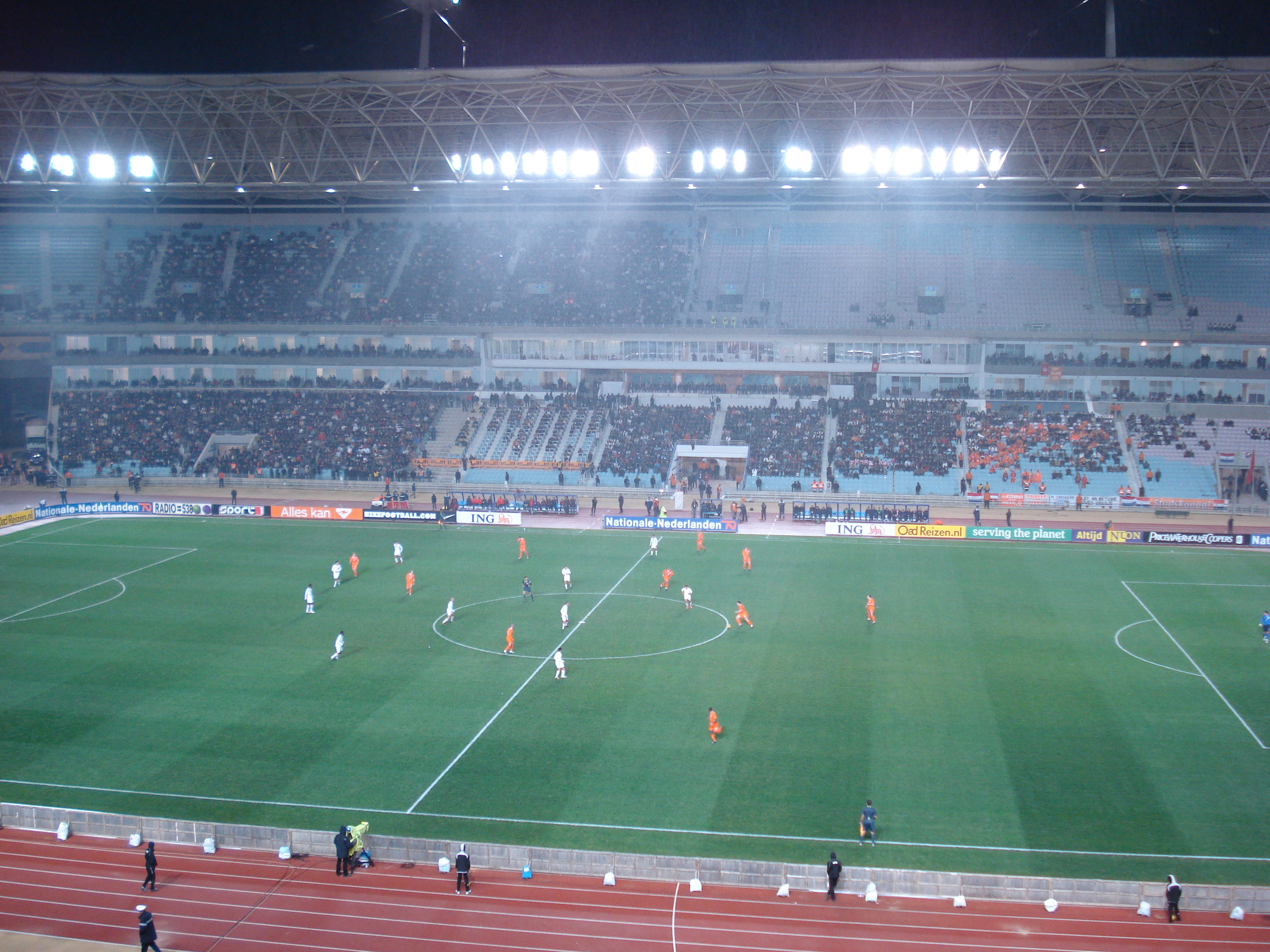
Tunisia against the Netherlands at Hammadi Agrebi Stadium in Radès.

After the independence of Tunisia in 1956, the Tunisian national stadium was Chedly Zouiten Stadium, which has a capacity of 18,000, and hosted all the matches of the Tunisian team. It hosted also the 1965 and 1994 African Cup of Nations and the 1977 FIFA World Youth Championship before it was replaced after the construction of El Menzah Stadium (45,000) in 1967 for the 1967 Mediterranean Games. Tunisia's first match at the stadium was played on 8 September 1967 against Libya. Tunisia won the match 3–0. This stadium became the new stronghold of the Eagles of Carthage. It hosted the 1977 FIFA World Youth Championship and was completely renovated for the 1994 African Cup of Nations. It hosted also the 2004 African Cup of Nations.

In 2001, the 7 November Stadium was inaugurated as Tunisia's national stadium ahead of the 2001 Mediterranean Games. Located in Radès, the stadium has an all-seater capacity of 60,000. The first match at the stadium was played on 7 July 2001 against between Étoile du Sahel and CS Hammam-Lif for the Tunisian Cup final. CS Hammam-Lif won the match 1–0, with Anis Ben Chouikha scoring the lone goal. Since that match, Tunisia has used the stadium for almost every major home game, including the 2004 African Cup of Nations Final. The Tunisians often host their matches at the Mustapha Ben Jannet Stadium in Monastir which has a capacity of 20,000.

In addition, there are many other venues that host the Tunisian team, such as the Sousse Olympic Stadium, which hosted a friendly match between Tunisia and Switzerland in November 2012 and also hosted a match in the 2012 Africa Cup of Nations qualification between Tunisia and Chad which was won by Tunisia 5–0. Gabès Municipal Stadium was also chosen to host a friendly match between Tunisia and Mauritania which ended with a draw in October 2016.

== Supporters ==
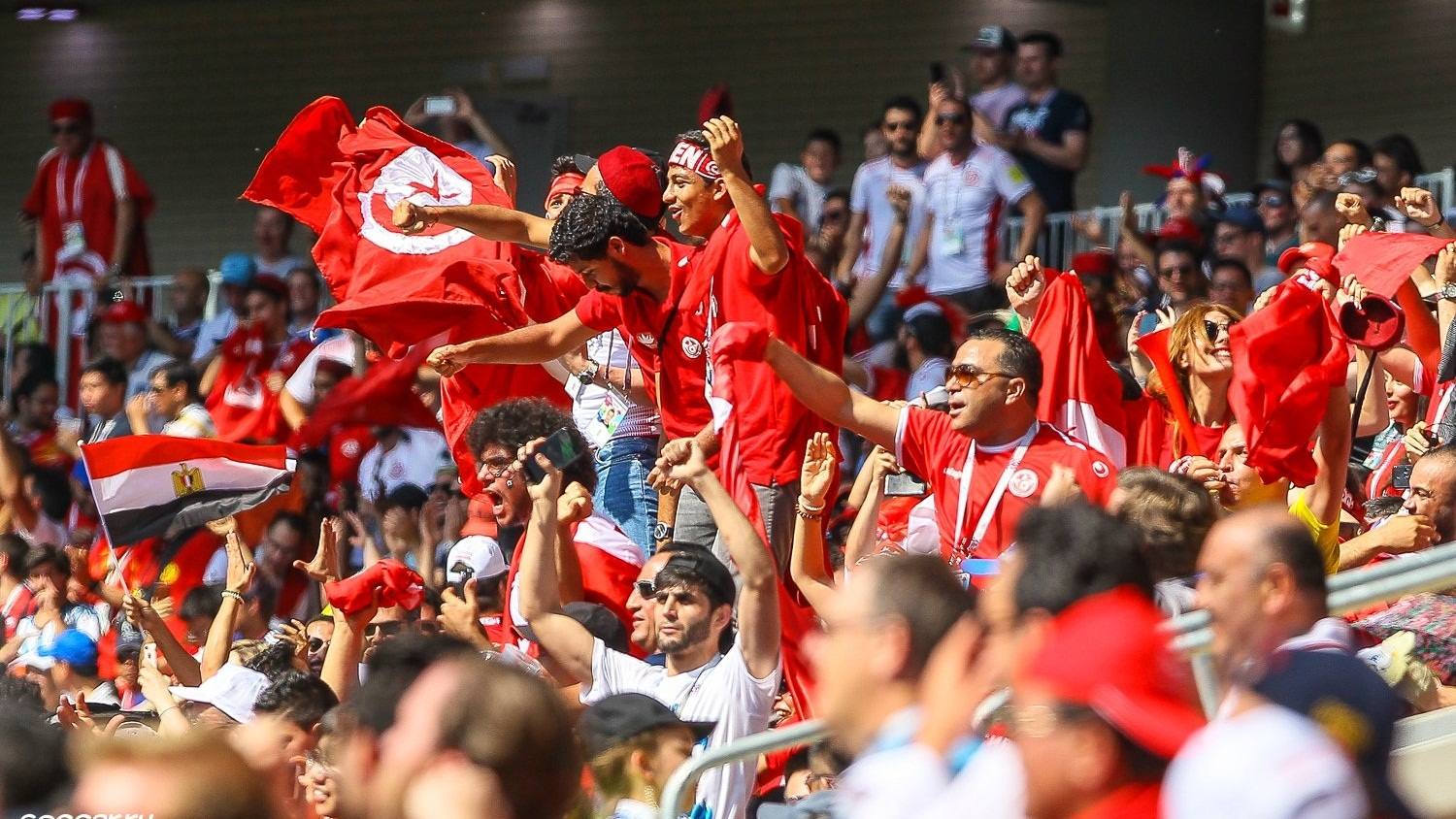
Tunisian fans in Moscow at the 2018 World Cup.

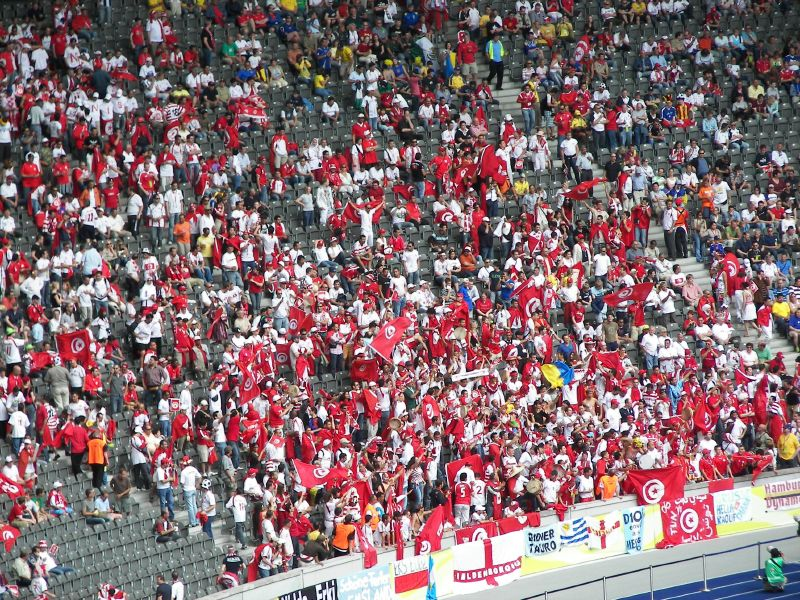
Tunisian fans in Berlin at the 2006 World Cup.

Fans of the Tunisian national team display the country's national flag, usually with an emphasis on the red element. One of the greatest moments for the Tunisian team was when the Tunisian delegation at the Tunis–Carthage International Airport received a warm "welcome home" after the 1978 epic that delighted the Tunisians, who still remember the details, and the performance of the team was credited with adding a new berth of qualification to Africa for the World Cup.

The team's popularity also appeared in the 2004 African Cup of Nations in Tunisia, where the crowds were heavily attended during that period. The Stade 7 November of Radès was filled with 60,000 spectators in the six matches of the tournament. The team's deterioration after the 2006 World Cup lead to their absence from the end stages of the next two world cups, and strained their popularity. In fact, the stadiums were almost empty with the national team's matches in that period. Between 2008 and 2014, local journalists accused the Tunisian team for their poor performance.

Of the fans that kept supporting the squad in bad times, Bechir Manoubi was one of the most loyal. He attended the team's matches worldwide since 1960, he was famous for wearing the Mexican hat and his suit with thousands of slogans and cards for the various events he covered. The 2006 World Cup qualifying match on 6 October 2005 between Tunisia and Morocco, which was just days before his death, was the last event he ever attended.

The emergence of skilled players and the rise of a new promising generation in addition to good results in the second term of Henryk Kasperczak, increased fans' enthusiasm and belief in a successful World Cup campaign. Because of this popularity peak, FIFA named the Tunisian fans among the best in the 2018 FIFA World Cup. This choice comes after the great attendance of the Tunisian masses, which turned to Russia in large numbers between 15 and 20 thousand fans, attended and supported the Tunisian team in their three group matches of the World Cup. However, fan support fell as Tunisia once again failed to live up the heavy expectation, with the Tunisians unable to progress from the group stage in its fifth World Cup participation.

== Rivalries ==
Tunisia's main football rivals are its neighbours Algeria, Morocco, and Egypt, with which it shares close cultural and political relations.

=== Algeria ===
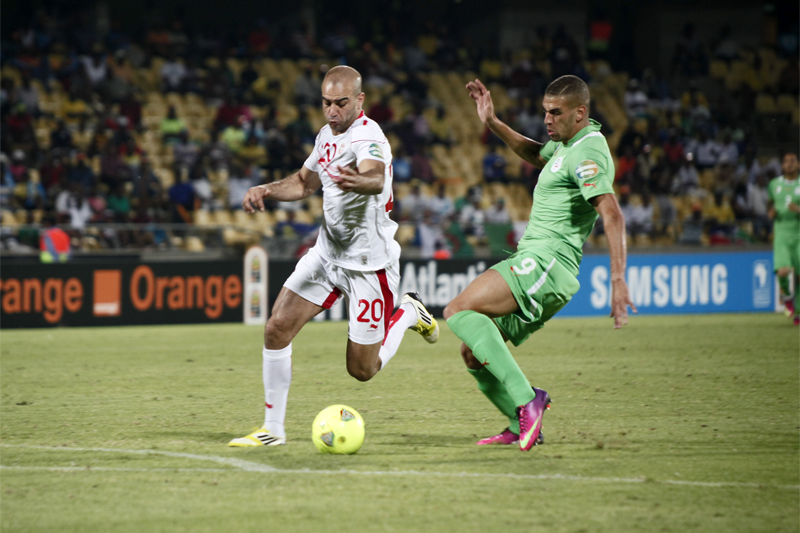
Tunisia-Algeria match in the 2013 African Cup won by Tunisia 1–0.

Tunisia played until today 45 games against Algeria. The first match took place on 1 June 1957 in a friendly match against the FLN football team when Algeria was a French colony. It was at this time that the matches were the most regular. Indeed, the two teams met six times, between June 1957 and May 1958, with eight victories for the Algerians. After the independence of Algeria, the first official match took place on 15 December 1963, in a friendly match at the Stade Chedly Zouiten in Tunisia. The teams also met three times in the qualifying phase of the World Cup in 1970, 1978 and 1986. The overall record is slightly favorable to the Algerians with sixteen wins, fourteen draws and fourteen losses. The last defeat of Algeria against their neighbors dated back to 20 January 2017 during the 2017 Africa Cup of Nations which was hosted by Gabon. Before this match, the two teams had met once in the African Cup of Nations finals in 2013, which was also dominated by the Tunisians. Currently, the Algerians dominate the head-to-head record and international achievement, nonetheless, in direct official competitions, Tunisia proves to be more dominant than Algeria. The last Algerian victory against Tunisia in an official game dates back to 1988 when the Algerians won by 1–0 in the 1988 Afcon qualifiers. Since then, Tunisia either won or drew against their neighbors in official games.

=== Egypt ===
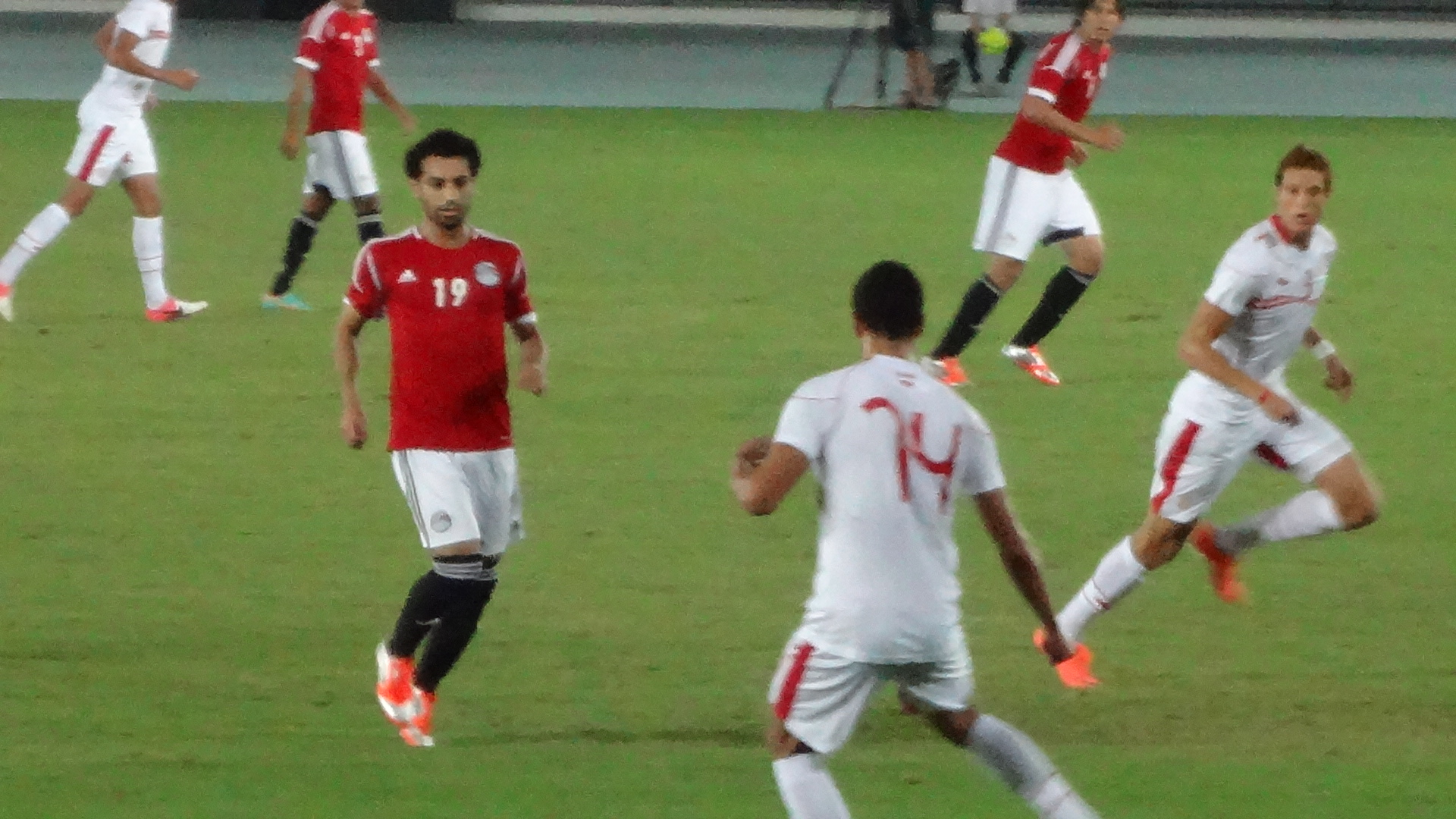
Tunisia-Egypt in a friendly match in October 2012 in Abu Dhabi.

The match between the Egyptian and the Tunisian team are one of Africa's best and most exciting matches for their long continental history. The two teams have met 39 times in both official and friendly matches. Tunisian and Egyptian teams have collected 25 official matches and 14 friendly matches. The overall record is slightly favorable to the Tunisians as they won 16 matches and Egypt won 12 matches and ended 11 matches with a draw; however Egypt has achieved more successes in Africa than Tunisia.

The Eagles scored 42 goals in the Pharaohs' goal, while Egypt scored only 35 goals against Tunisia. The largest goal scoring match was on 11 December 1977 for the 1978 FIFA World Cup qualification (CAF) after the great win of the Tunisians 4–1 which contributed in their qualification for the World Cup. Tunisia have faced the Egyptian team 7 times in qualifying for either the World Cup or the African Nations Cup. The three World Cup qualifications were in 1974, 1978 and 1998 where Tunisia qualified in the last two editions against Egypt. The four qualifiers for the African Nations Cup were in 1978 (Tunisia won 3–2 after drawing 2–2), 1984 (0–0 draw in Tunis and the Pharaohs won in Cairo 1–0), 1992 (the teams drew 2–2 twice) and 2015 (Tunisia won 1–0 and 2–1 respectively), in addition to the current 2019 qualifiers for the fifth time, which Tunisia won the first game 1–0 in Radès and lost the second game in Alexandria 2–3.

The two teams met twice in the African Nations Cup finals in 2000 in Nigeria when Tunisia won 1–0 and in the next edition in 2002 in Mali when Egypt won with the same result. Hossam Hassan is the most of Egyptian players participating in the games of the Pharaohs against the Eagles of Carthage with 12 games, while Wahbi Khazri comes as the most of Tunisian players to participate in their matches against Egypt by 3 games. Both Egypt and Tunisia also share a similar dubious record in the FIFA World Cup, with both teams being unable to progress beyond the group stage despite Tunisia qualifying for the World Cup five times, while Egypt qualified only three times.

=== Morocco ===
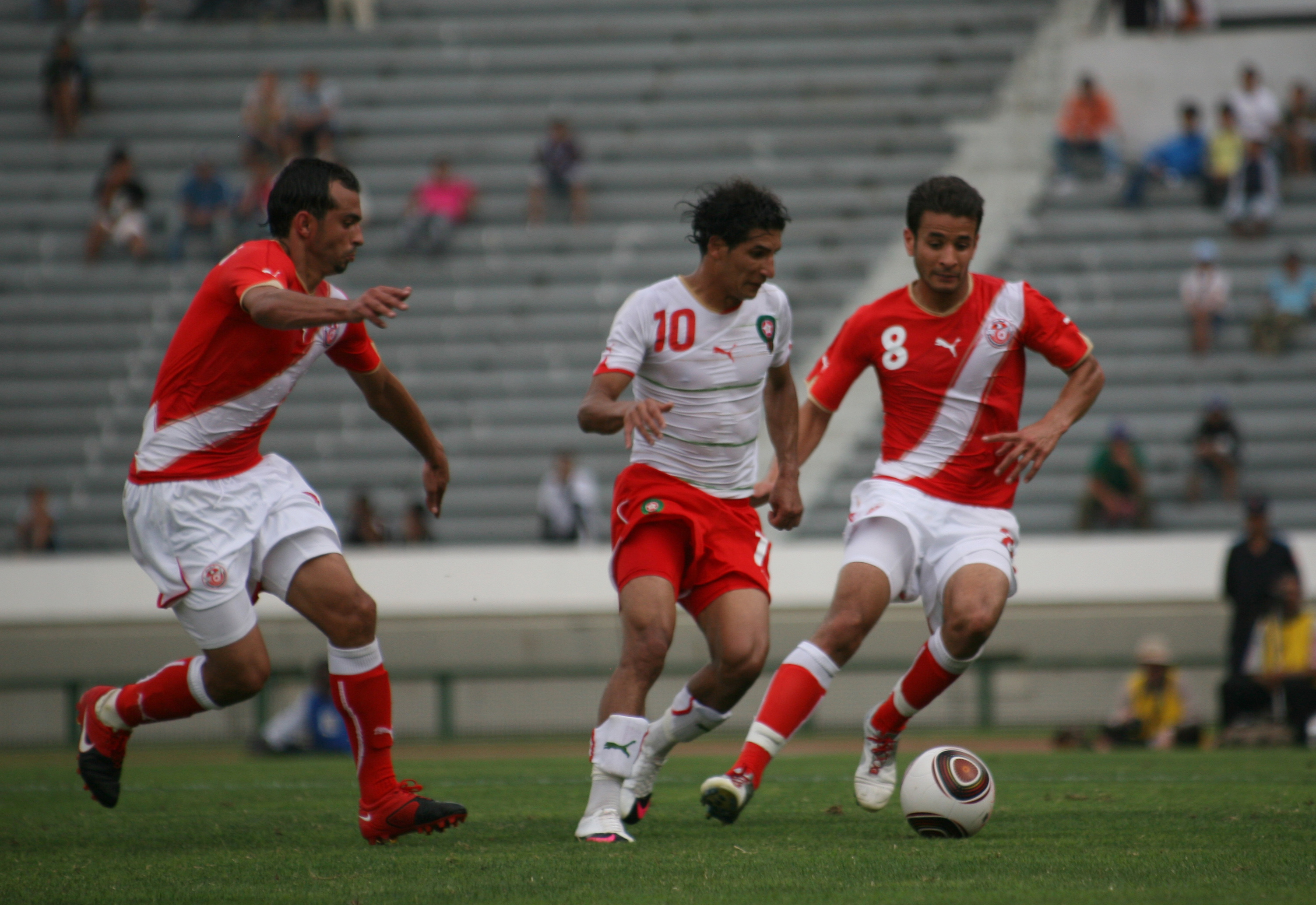
Tunisia-Morocco match on 5 June 2010 in Casablanca.

Tunisians and Moroccans have played 50 games since their independence from France in 1956. Their first match was for the 1962 World Cup qualification, took place on 30 October 1960 in Casablanca. Most of the matches were played in the FIFA World Cup qualification as they met in the qualifiers of 1962, 1970, 1978, 1990, 1994 and 2006. They also met 4 times in the African Cup of Nations. Two of them ended in a draw in 1978 and 2000 and the other two matches with the victory of the Tunisian team in 2004 and 2012 Africa Cup of Nations.

In fact, their most important match was the 2004 African Cup of Nations Final in Stade 7 November in Tunisia, where the Tunisians won their first African title. The overall record is favorable to the Moroccans with 13 wins, 28 draws and 9 losses; but Tunisia has managed to dominate majority of official encounters in major competitions. The last match between the Maghrebian teams dated back to 28 March 2017 during a friendly match won by Morocco in Marrakesh which contributed to the dismissal of the Tunisian coach Henryk Kasperczak.

The two teams are similar in terms of both having a single African Cup and the two teams have also qualified for five World Cups, despite their numerous World Cup qualifying matches. They qualified for the same tournament in 1998 in France and 2018 in Russia and 2022 in Qatar.

== Kits history ==
In the history of the Tunisia national football team, 6 companies supplied sports uniforms to the Tunisian national team, starting in 1970, when the famous German company Adidas began to adopt the Tunisian national team's uniforms for 24 years and also provided it, in his first appearance in the 1978 FIFA World Cup, with a first set of red jerseys and white socks with white Adidas posters. For the second kit, it's all white with red Adidas labels.

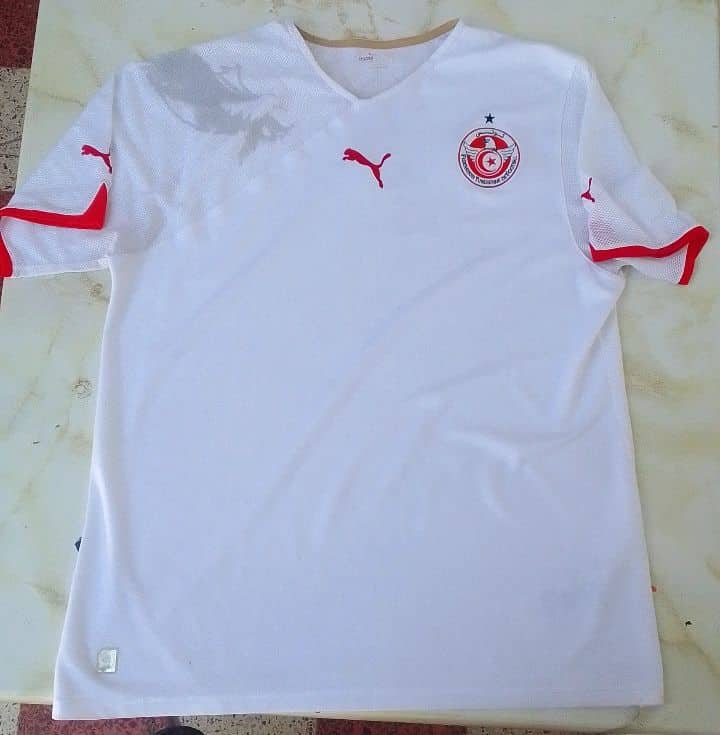
Tunisia 2010–11 home kit

Starting in 1994, the Italian company Lotto increased the Tunisian team with sports uniforms until 1998 in Tunisia's second participation in the 1998 FIFA World Cup. The first set is white decorated with curved red shapes on the shoulders and chest, while the second set is decorated in red. with curved red shapes on the shoulders, chest and abdomen. The German company Uhlsport supplied the Tunisian team with sports uniforms for two periods, the first for a single 2000–2001 season, where the company designed a white shirt with a line on the chest that extends to the hands and the second set consists of a red shirt with the same line on the chest and extended to the hands in white.

From 2002 to 2011, the German company Puma started providing the Tunisian national football team kits since the 2002 FIFA World Cup. In fact, the company supplied 6 designs of the Tunisian national team kits, all of which are similar in the wording of the logo and the company's signs, where the main kit is white with Puma red marks and the spare kit is red with white Puma markings. In 2012, the Tunisian Football Federation entered into a contract with the Swiss company Burrda Sport for a period of four years until 2016, and supplied the Tunisian national team crews in the 2012, 2013, and 2015 African Nations Cups. In 2016, the German company Uhlsport returned to supply the Tunisian national team with sports kits with a contract It has a duration of three years, and indeed the company presented the Tunisian national team kit at the 2018 FIFA World Cup, but it was not according to expectations.

In 2019, the Italian company Kappa began manufacturing the Tunisian national football team kits. The third kit has been described as the best kit in the history of the Tunisian national team. It is black and has gray trims forming an eagle, which is the title of the Tunisian national team, "Eagles of Carthage".

=== Kit manufacturer ===
Period	Kit supplier	Ref
1956–1970	Local equipment	
1970–1994	(Germany) Adidas	
1994–1995	(Tunisia) Guidas	
1995–1997	(Italy) Kappa	
1998–2000	(Italy) Lotto	
2000–2001	(Germany) Uhlsport	
2002–2010	(Germany) Puma	
2011–2015	(Switzerland) Burrda Sport	
2016–2018	(Germany) Uhlsport	
2018–	(Italy) Kappa	

== Competitive record ==
=== FIFA World Cup ===
Tunisia has participated six times in the FIFA World Cup, the biggest men's football event in the world, in 1978, 1998, 2002, 2006, 2018 and 2022. Throughout all the participations, Tunisia was unable to advance beyond the group stage. Tunisia qualified for the World Cup for the first time in its history during the 1978 edition in Argentina, competing in Group 2 under the leadership of coach Abdelmajid Chetali. Tunisia became the first African and Arab team to win a World Cup match, after defeating Mexico 3−1 in Tunisia's first match in the competition. The team then lost to Poland 0−1 and drew with defending champion West Germany 0−0, exiting the tournament in the group stage. Ali Kaabi, Mokhtar Dhouieb and Néjib Ghommidh scored the team's goals.

Tunisia failed to qualify for the World Cup for the next four editions until returning 20 years later to the 1998 FIFA World Cup in France, competing in Group G, led by polish coach Henryk Kasperczak. The team lost its first two matches against England 0−2 and Colombia 0−1, and tied with Romania in the last round 1−1. Skander Souayah scored Tunisia's only goal in the tournament. Tunisia qualified for the 2002 FIFA World Cup in South Korea and Japan, where Tunisia played its matches in Japan, competing in Group H, led by coach Ammar Souayah. The team lost its first match against Russia 0−2, then drew 1−1 with Belgium before being eliminated again after a 0−2 defeat to hosts Japan. Raouf Bouzaiene scored Tunisia's only goal. Tunisia qualified for the 2006 FIFA World Cup in Germany competing in Group H, led by french coach Roger Lemerre. The team tied in the first match against Saudi Arabia 2−2, but suffered two defeats against the strong Spain 1−3 despite taking the lead in the first minutes of the match, and then against Ukraine 0−1. Ziad Jaziri, Radhi Jaïdi and Jawhar Mnari scored Tunisia's three goals in the tournament.

Tunisia failed to qualify for the next two editions in South Africa and Brazil, and the team returned to competition after a 12-year absence at the 2018 FIFA World Cup in Russia, where it competed in Group G, led by coach Nabil Maâloul. The team's performance did not rise as it came in a difficult group that included England, Belgium and Panama, which qualified for the first time. The team suffered two consecutive defeats against European opponents: England 1−2 and a heavy defeat to strong Belgium 2−5. However, the team won its last match against Panama 2−1. Wahbi Khazri scored two goals, while Ferjani Sassi, Dylan Bronn and Fakhreddine Ben Youssef each scored one goal. Tunisia qualified for the 2022 FIFA World Cup in Qatar, the first edition to be held in the Arab world. The team competed in Group D under the leadership of coach Jalel Kadri. The team drew 0−0 with Denmark and then suffered a 0−1 defeat to Australia, but still won 1−0 against defending champions France. But the team was unable to advance to the round of 16 due to Denmark's victory over Australia, and Tunisia left the group stage again. Khazri scored Tunisia's only goal.

Wahbi Khazri is the Tunisian player who has scored the most goals in the competition with three: two in 2018 and one in the 2022 edition. Riadh Bouazizi and Kaies Ghodhbane are the two Tunisian players with the most matches played (eight games each in 1998, 2002 and 2006).

=== Africa Cup of Nations ===
Tunisia has participated in the Africa Cup of Nations 21 times, and holds the record for the number of consecutive participations with 17, as the team has not been absent from the competition since the 1994 edition on its home soil. The first participation was in the 1962 edition in Ethiopia. Tunisia played their first match on 14 January 1962 and lost to the host country team 2–4 in the semi-final. However, Tunisia beat Uganda 3–0 in the third place match to win the bronze medal. Tunisia hosted the event for the first time during the 1965 edition, where the team reached the final and lost to the defending champions Ghana 0–2 after extra time to add the silver medal.

In the next two decades, the team participated only twice, finishing fourth in the 1978 edition in Ghana and being eliminated from the group stage in the 1982 edition in Libya. After failing to qualify for the next five editions, the team returned to the competition, hosting the 1994 edition and achieving the worst participation in its history and on home soil after losing to Mali 0–2 and drawing against Zaire 1–1, eliminating it from the group stage. In the 1996 edition, led by Polish coach Henryk Kasperczak, the team reached the final, but lost to hosts South Africa 0–2. Eight years later, in the 2004 edition hosted by Tunisia for the third time, the team won the title for the first time in its history, led by the French coach Roger Lemerre with a respectable generation of players, after defeating Senegal in the quarter-finals and Nigeria in the semi-finals, and defeated Morocco in the final match 2–1.

Since then, the team has not achieved noticeable results, as it was eliminated from the group stage in 2010, 2013 and 2023, exited from the quarter-finals in 2006, 2008, 2012, 2015, 2017 and 2021, and achieved fourth place in 2019. In total, Tunisia have participated in the African Cup of Nations 21 times, playing 83 matches, with 25 wins, 30 draws and 28 losses, scoring 100 goals and conceding 97. The nation's biggest victories at the tournament were 4–0 wins against Ethiopia on 12 November 1965 and against Mauritania on 16 January 2022. Tunisia's biggest defeats were 3–0 losses against Cameroon on 10 February 2000, against Guinea on 30 January 2006, and against the Ivory Coast on 26 January 2013. Francileudo Santos is the top-scoring Tunisian player at the tournament with ten total goals, while Youssef Msakni has appeared in a record 29 matches across eight tournaments between 2010 and 2023.

=== African Nations Championship ===
Tunisia has participated in two editions of the African Nations Championship. In the 2009 African Nations Championship qualification, Tunisia represented by the U-23 team, under the management of Mondher Kebaier, where Tunisiaeliminated there in the qualification phase. In 2011, under the leadership of Sami Trabelsi, Tunisia qualified for the finals and won the championship by beating Angola in the final. In 2014, placed under the direction of Nabil Maâloul, she was eliminated in the qualification phase.

In the 2016 African Nations Championship qualification, under the leadership of Henryk Kasperczak, Tunisia qualified for the finals, but Hatem Missaoui led the team in Rwanda. Tunisia was eliminated in the quarterfinals by Mali. In the next edition, the Tunisian Football Federation announced that Tunisia will not participate in the 2018 African Nations Championship due to the participation of the first team in the 2018 FIFA World Cup. In 2020 African Nations Championship qualification, Tunisia faced Libya two home and away games, winning the first match 1–0 at Stade Olympique de Radès and the second 2–1 at Stade Boubker Ammar; Anice Badri scores the goals for Tunisia in both cases. The national team qualified for the final phase but, on 20 December 2019, the qualification was withdrawn by the Tunisian Football Federation due to the intensity of the matches. The team didn't enter to the 2022 African Nations Championship qualification.

On 9 October 2024, during the draw for the 2024 African Nations Championship qualification, CAF has allocated three places for the North African region, however Algeria and Egypt have declined to participate, it was decided that Libya, Morocco and Tunisia would automatically qualify for the final tournament. However, on 9 November Tunisia withdrew again from participation after meeting with representatives of Tunisian league clubs due to the pressure of the calendar.

=== FIFA Arab Cup ===
Tunisia has participated three times in the FIFA Arab Cup, the biggest men's football event in the Arab world. Tunisia was one of five teams participating in the first edition of the Arab Nations Cup, held in Beirut, Lebanon, in 1963. At the time, the tournament was official. Under the leadership of French coach André Gérard, Tunisia won the title, finishing first in the group after winning all four of its matches and collecting eight points against Syria 1–0, Jordan 4–0, Kuwait 5–1, and Lebanon 1–0. Mongi Haddad was the tournament's top scorer with four goals. Tunisia missed the next three editions and did not return until 1988. Under the leadership of Mokhtar Tlili, the team was forced to play two qualifying matches, drawing 0–0 against Algeria and winning 2–1 against Mauritania. During the finals, the team's performances did not live up to expectations, and they were eliminated in the first round after three draws against Iraq 1–1, Saudi Arabia 1–1, and Lebanon 1–1, as well as a 0–1 defeat against Egypt.

On 25 July 2020, FIFA invited Tunisia to participate in the 2021 FIFA Arab Cup in Qatar, the first edition under the auspices of FIFA with the participation of sixteen teams in the final tournament. Tunisia advanced directly to the finals without qualifying, thanks to its first place in the Arab world in the FIFA world rankings. The team finished first in its group after two wins against Mauritania 5–1 and the United Arab Emirates 1–0, as well as a surprise defeat against Syria 0–2. In the quarter-finals, the team defeated Oman 2–1 and, in the semifinals, Egypt 1–0 thanks to a goal in the 90+5 minute. However, Tunisia lost the final to Algeria 0–2 after extra time. Seifeddine Jaziri was the tournament's top scorer with four.

On 26 April 2025, FIFA invited Tunisia to participate in the 2025 FIFA Arab Cup in Qatar. Tunisia advanced directly to the finals without qualifying, thanks to its fifth place in the Arab world in the FIFA world rankings.

=== FIFA Confederations Cup ===
Tunisia participated at the FIFA Confederations Cup on one occasion, a sole appearance in 2005. Tunisia qualified for the 2005 FIFA Confederations Cup as the CAF representative after winning 2004 Africa Cup of Nations. The opening match of this tournament was between Tunisia and Argentina, Tunisia lost by a narrow margin 1–2. In the second match, the Tunisians resisted until the 74th minute, where they conceded three goals from the German team to end the match, while in the third match they managed to beat Australia 2–0, to leave good impressions.

=== Mediterranean Games ===
The Tunisian national team participated in the football tournament in the Mediterranean Games 12 times. The first participation in the event was in the 1963 edition in Naples, Italy. Tunisia was satisfied with the sixth place at the time after being eliminated from the group stage. The Tunisian team reached the final twice, the first in the 1971 edition in Izmir, Turkey and won the silver medal after defeating in the final by Yugoslavia 0–1 and the second time in the 2001 edition in Tunis, Tunisia. The Tunisian team then won the gold medal after defeating Italy 1–0. The Tunisian team also won the bronze medal twice, first in the 1975 edition in Algiers, Algeria and the second time in the 2013 edition in Mersin, Turkey.

== Controversies ==
=== Tunisia vs. Equatorial Guinea refereeing at 2015 Afcon ===
Wadie Jary, the president of the Tunisian Football Federation, claimed that there was a bias against Tunisia following their controversial quarter-final defeat to Equatorial Guinea on 31 January 2015. He was banned from CAF competitions and activities. Rajindraparsad Seechurn, the Mauritian referee who gave a penalty to Equatorial Guinea in that match, was banned from officiating for six months and removed from CAF's elite register of referees. The Tunisian FA was fined $50,000 for confronting the referee during the match, in addition to damage to changing room facilities, while Equatorial Guinea was fined $5,000 for inadequate security at the stadium.

=== Tunisia vs. Mali refereeing at 2021 Afcon ===
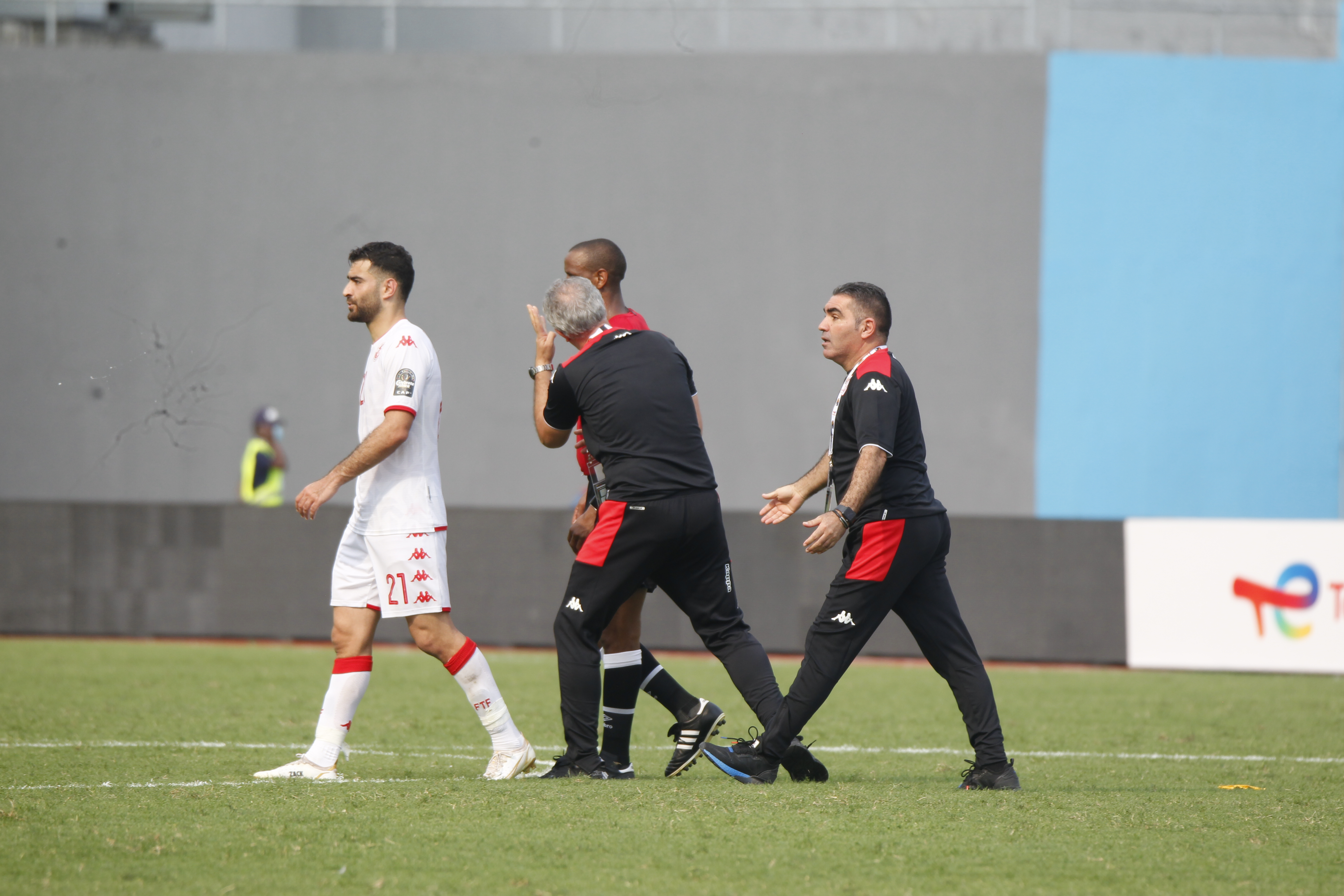
Mondher Kebaier and Jalel Kadri protesting against referee Janny Sikazwe after the controversy during the match against Mali at 2021 Afcon.

The match between Tunisia and Mali, the first meeting of Group F, was not played to completion. Zambian referee Janny Sikazwe initially whistled the end of the match in the 86th minute before changing his mind, warned by his assistant referee and the protests of the Tunisian players. He then signaled the end of the game in the 90th minute, seconds from the end of regulation time, just as the assistant referee was about to announce added time. In front of the furious Tunisians, the refereeing quartet had to leave the field under police escort.

Given the extent of the controversy, the resumption of the match, to play the remaining additional time, was announced. However, the Tunisian team refused to resume the match, claiming that the players were already in the showers, or out of the stadium, therefore unfit to resume the game. The Malians having presented themselves on the lawn, the end of the match is whistled with only one team on the ground, the result of 1–0 being ratified later by CAF.

Later, it was reported by different media that the referee Janny Sikazwe had in fact suffered a sunstroke in the middle of the game, so much so that he was even taken to the hospital, from where the presence of the fourth referee on the pitch at the time of the attempt to restart the match. According to the Tunisian player Wahbi Khazri, the referee of the match "was no longer coherent", "the referee lost the thread of the match" specified the Tunisian captain. "He was no longer consistent in his choices and decisions. He was very hot."

=== Threatening to be excluded from the 2022 World Cup ===
At the end of October 2022, an internal dispute concerning the Minister of Youth and Sports, Kamel Deguiche, and the president of the federation, Wadie Jary, threatens Tunisia's participation in the World Cup. Indeed, the two men are known to hate each other and the first wishes to dissolve the federation to separate from the second. FIFA systematically penalizes cases of interference in the world of football, it therefore warns the Tunisian federation: by means of a letter, it warns that it reserves the right to exclude Tunisia from the competition in case of taking power over the federation by Deguiche.

=== Allegations of interference in the 2022 World Cup squad ===
Dozens of news websites in Tunisia reported that coach Jalel Kadri was subjected to pressure during the formation of the Tunisian team's squad for the 2022 World Cup, according to the player Saad Bguir, who was excluded from the final list and who was on the initial list. He also announced his international retirement through a phone call on the TV program Stade Plus on Carthage Plus, until the president of the Tunisian Football Federation, Wadie Jary, left his position. It started when Bilel Ifa was excluded from the list a day before the official announcement, and was later brought back after fans outraged on social media. On 14 November 2022, hundreds of fans greeted the team bus in Doha upon their arrival, but the president of the Federation was insulted in the worst terms.

Also, the selection of four goalkeepers was under pressure from the Tunisian Football Federation to meet the wishes of certain teams on the financial level, FIFA, since the 2010 FIFA World Cup, paying a subsidy to each. team, of which at least one player has been called up in each edition of the competition. On 28 November 2022, former national team player Issam Jemâa said on Radio IFM, that TFF officials had sacrificed one of the players to call four goalkeepers into the final list, as the choice was on Bilel Ifa, who returned to the team after the anger of the fans, Taha Yassine Khenissi, who was medically examined for two hours, so they could find him injured or Seifeddine Jaziri, who was called up due of financial transactions between him and the brother of the president of the TFF, Wajih Jary. In the final, Saad Bguir was abandoned.
