= 2009 UNAF Women's Tournament =

Tournament details
- Country: Tunisia
- Dates: 2 – 6 November
- Teams: 3

Final positions
- Champions: Tunisia (1st title)
- Runners-up: Algeria
- Third place: Egypt

Tournament statistics
- Matches played: 3
- Goals scored: 11 (3.67 per match)
- Top goal scorer: (Tunisia) Fatma Mlahi (3 goals)

Awards
- Best player: (Algeria) Sabrina Dalhoum

The 2009 UNAF Women's Tournament is the 1st edition of the UNAF Women's Tournament, an association football tournament open to the women's national teams of UNAF member countries. The tournament took place in Tunisia. Of the five UNAF member countries, Libya and Morocco chose not to participate in the competition. Tunisia won the competition after winning their two games against Algeria and Egypt.

== Participants ==
- Algeria
- Egypt
- Tunisia (hosts)
- Libya (withdrew)
- Morocco (withdrew)

== Venues ==
Tunis	Bizerte
Stade El Menzah	Stade 15 Octobre
Capacity: 45,000	Capacity: 15,000
Hammam Sousse	2009 UNAF Women's Tournament is located in Tunisia
Stade Bou Ali-Lahouar	2009 UNAF Women's Tournament is located in Tunisia
Capacity: 6,500	2009 UNAF Women's Tournament is located in Tunisia

== Tournament ==
=== Matches ===
2 November 2009
15:00

Algeria	1–1	Egypt

Stade 15 Octobre, Bizerte

4 November 2009
15:00

Tunisia	1–0	Algeria
Mlayeh 78'

Stade Bou Ali-Lahouar, Hammam Sousse

6 November 2009
15:00

Tunisia	6–2	Egypt
Mlayeh 5', 72'; Chebbi 11' (pen.); Hannachi 31'; Mamay 80'; Abidi 85'		Abdallah 36'; Mansour 83' (pen.)

Stade El Menzah, Tunis

=== Final ranking ===
R	Team	P	W	D	L	GF	GA	GD	Pts.
1	Tunisia	2	2	0	0	7	2	+5	6
2	Algeria	2	0	1	1	1	2	−1	1
3	Egypt	2	0	1	1	3	7	−4	1
