= Maroua Chebbi =

Tunisian footballer (born 1986)

Personal information
- Date of birth: 30 December 1986 (age 39)
- Place of birth: Tunis, Tunisia
- Position: Midfielder

College career
Years	Team	Apps	(Gls)
2010–2011	Laval Rouge et Or		

Senior career*
Years	Team	Apps	(Gls)
2004–2009	Tunis Air Club		
2009	Quebec City Amiral SC		
2010	Tunis Air Club		
2012	Quebec City Amiral SC		

International career
- Tunisia
- * Club domestic league appearances and goals

Maroua Chebbi (Arabic: مروى الشابي; born 30 December 1986) is a Tunisian footballer who plays as a midfielder. She has been a member of the Tunisia women's national team.

== Club career ==
Chebbi has played for Tunis Air Club in Tunisia and for Quebec City Amiral SC and Laval Rouge et Or in Canada.

== International goals ==
Scores and results list Tunisia goal tally first

No.	Date	Venue	Opponent	Score	Result	Competition	Ref.
1	6 November 2009	Stade El Menzah, Tunis, Tunisia	Egypt	2–0	6-2	2009 UNAF Women's Tournament	
2	22 May 2010	Stade de Koléa, Koléa, Algeria	Algeria	1–0	1–1	2010 African Women's Championship qualification	

== See also ==
- List of Tunisia women's international footballers
