= Mouna Hannachi =

Tunisian football player and manager

Personal information
- Position: Defender

Senior career*
Years	Team	Apps	(Gls)
- ASBH

International career^{‡}
2009	Tunisia	3+	(1+)
2011	United Arab Emirates	1+	(0+)

Managerial career
- Juventus Academy Oman
- * Club domestic league appearances and goals ‡ National team caps and goals as of 12 October 2011.

Mouna Hannachi (Arabic: منى حناشي) is a Tunisian football former player and current manager. Nicknamed Manino, she played as a defender and has represented the Tunisia women's national team.

== Club career ==
Hannachi has played for AS Banque de l’Habitat in Tunisia.

== International career ==
Hannachi has capped for Tunisia at senior level, including a 0–4 friendly loss to Algeria on 23 June 2009.

=== International goals ===
Scores and results list Tunisia goal tally first

No.	Date	Venue	Opponent	Score	Result	Competition	Ref.
1	6 November 2009	Stade El Menzah, Tunis, Tunisia	Egypt	3–0	6–2	2009 UNAF Women's Tournament	

== See also ==
- List of Tunisia women's international footballers
