= Ella Kaabachi =

French–Tunisian footballer (born 1992)

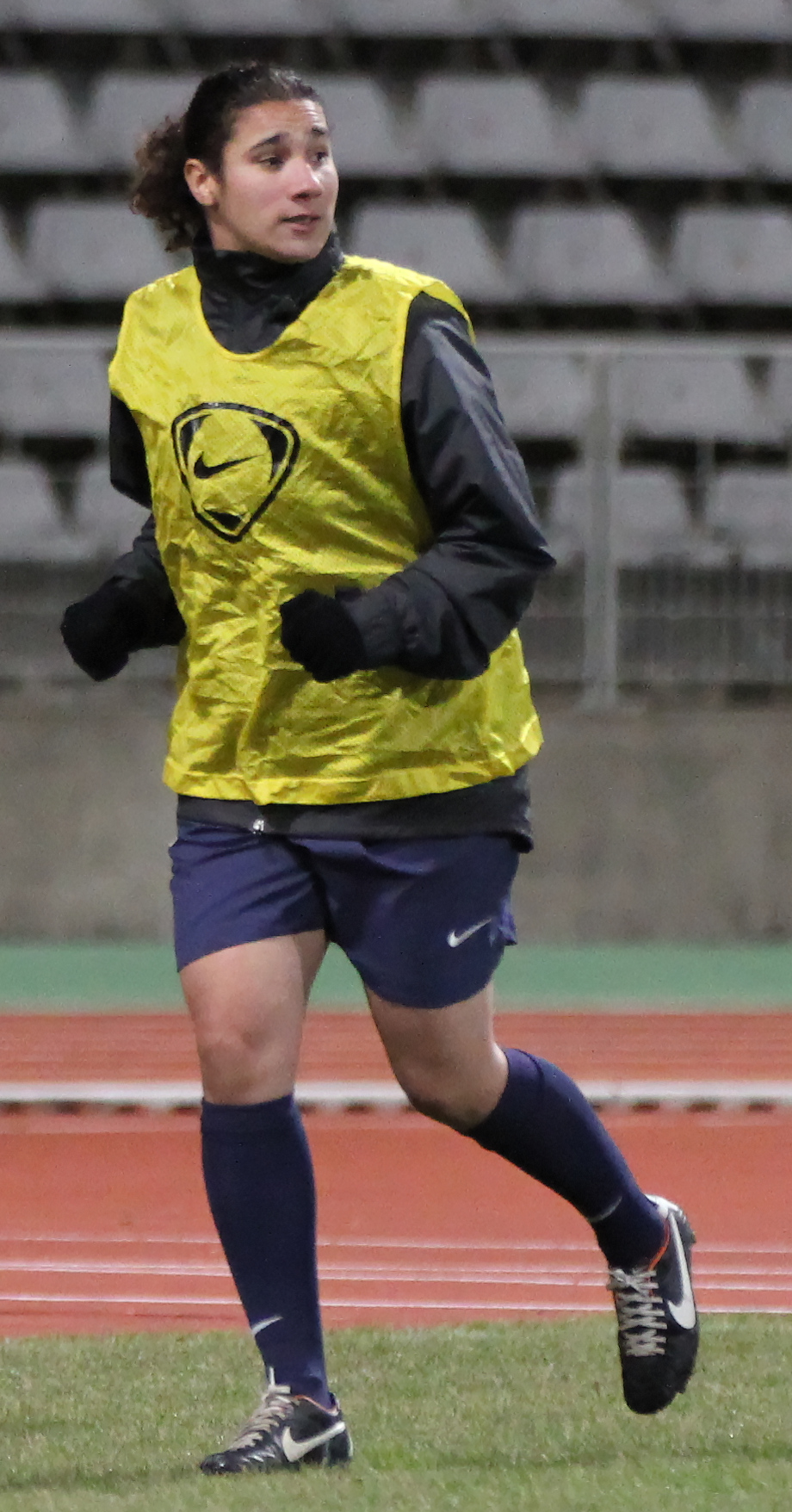
- Kaabachi in 2012

Personal information
- Date of birth: 15 May 1992 (age 34)
- Place of birth: Argenteuil, France
- Position: Forward

Senior career*
Years	Team	Apps	(Gls)
2008–2013	Paris Saint-Germain	21	(1)
2013–2016	Rodez	47	(2)
2016–2017	FC Rouen		
2017–2021	GPSO 92 Issy	24	(2)
2021–2023	Soyaux	41	(0)
2024	Al-Shabab	6	(6)

International career^{‡}
2007	France U16	2	(0)
2006	France U17	2	(0)
2014–	Tunisia	5+	(8)
- * Club domestic league appearances and goals as of 16:35, 27 November 2024 (UTC) ‡ National team caps and goals as of 10:14, 29 June 2021 (UTC)

Ella Kaabachi (Arabic: ايلا كعباشي; born 15 May 1992) is a footballer who plays as a forward. Born in France, she represents Tunisia at international level.

== Early life ==
Kaabachi was born in Argenteuil to a Tunisian father and an Algerian mother. She has French nationality.

== International career ==
Kaabachi capped for Tunisia at senior level, including a friendly on 10 June 2021, starting the match and scoring a goal against Jordan.

Kaabachi was part of the Tunisia squad that was called up for the 2022 Women's Africa Cup of Nations.

== Career statistics ==
Scores and results list Tunisia's goal tally first

No.	Date	Venue	Opponent	Score	Result	Competition	Ref.
1	23 May 2014	Stade Omar Hamadi, Algiers	Algeria	1	1–2	2014 Africa Women Cup of Nations qualification	
2	8 June 2014	Stade 15 Octobre , Bizerte, Tunisia	Algeria	2	2–3	2014 Africa Women Cup of Nations qualification	
3	15 December 2015	stade Bouloughine, Alger, Algiers	Algeria	1	1–1	Friendly	
4	18 December 2015	Centre Technique National de la FAF , Sidi Moussa, Algiers	Algeria	1	3–1	Friendly	
5	6 April 2016	Stade Oued Ellil, Oued Ellil, Tunisia	Ghana	1	1–2	2016 Africa Women Cup of Nations qualification	
6	10 June 2021	King Abdullah II Stadium, Amman, Jordan	Jordan	1	2–1	Friendly	
7	20 October 2021	Petro Sport Stadium, Cairo, Egypt	Egypt	3	6–2	2022 Africa Women Cup of Nations qualification	
8	28 November 2021	Ariana Stadium, Ariana, Tunisia	Algeria	1	2–4	Friendly	

== See also ==
- List of Tunisia women's international footballers
