= 2025–26 Algerian Women's Cup =

Tournament details
- Country: Algeria
- Dates: 28 November 2025 – 25 April 2026
- Teams: 40

Final positions
- Champions: JS Kabylie (2nd title)
- Runners-up: Afak Relizane
- All statistics correct as of 22 November 2025. Goals scored in penalty shoot-outs not included.

the 2025–26 Algerian Women's Cup is the 25th season of the annual Algerian women's association football cup competition. Thirteen teams participated in the competition. JS Kabylie are the defending champions, having beaten CF Akbou 3–1 in the 2025 final.

== Teams ==
Round	Clubs remaining	Clubs involved	Winners from previous round	New entries this round	Leagues entering at this round
Regional rounds
Preleminary round 1	24	–	–	–	National Championship D2
Preleminary round 2	22	22	12	10	Elite National Championship
National rounds
Round of 16	16	16	11	5	Elite National Championship
Quarter-finals	8	8	8	none	none
Semi-finals	4	4	4	none	none
Final	2	2	2	none	none

== Knockout stage ==
=== Preleminary round 1 ===
24 teams take part to the preliminary round from the second division. JS Saoura and DS Tiaret exempted from the first preleminary round.

==== Center ====
29 November 2025 1	AES Souk El Tenine	0–7	ASD Tizi Ouzou	El Kseur
10:00

29 November 2025 2	Paradou AC	3–4	USM Alger	Birkhadem
10:00

29 November 2025 3	CFN Boumerdes	2–4	MC Alger	Lakhdaria
10:00

28 November 2025 4	FC Casbah	3–0	US Ouled Fayet	Douera
09:00

==== East ====
29 November 2025 5	NE Bouira	1–0	CSA Bordj Bou Arreridj	Akbou
10:00				Stadium: 1 November 1954 Stadium

29 November 2025 6	CM Batna	Withrew	ES Sétif	Ras El Aioun
10:00				Stadium: Olympic Stadium

29 November 2025 7	MF Bouchegouf	1–0	AR Tebessa SF	Oum El Bouaghi
10:00				Stadium: Hassouna Zerdani Stadium

29 November 2025 8	MB Rouissat	2–0	CRA Témacine	Zelfana
10:00				Stadium: Communal Stadium

==== West ====
29 November 2025 9	CF Ténès	1–2	CSB Oran	Relizane
11:00				Stadium: Tahar Zoughari Stadium

28 November 2025 10	MC Oran	4–1	AS Intissar Oran	El Kerma
09:00	? (o.g.); Lazreg		?	Stadium: Mohamed Khassani Stadium

29 November 2025 11	CSA Jawharet Canastel	2–2 (4–2 p)	FC Bel Abbès	Aïn El Arbaa
10:00				Stadium: Communal Stadium

29 November 2025 12	MC El Bayadh	5–0	ECAFF Adrar	Béchar
10:00				Stadium: 20 August 1955 Stadium

=== Preleminary round 2 ===
22 teams take part to the preliminary round from first and second division. CF Akbou, CR Belouizdad, JF Khroub, Afak Relizane and JS Kabylie exempted from the second preleminary round.

==== East ====
13 December 2025 1	AR Guelma	7–0	MF Bouchegouf	Guelma
10:00				Stadium: Boudjemaa Souidani Stadium

13 December 2025 2	CS Constantine	3–2	JS Saoura	Biskra / El Hadjeb
10:00				Stadium: 1 November 1954 Stadium / Zaatcha Stadium

13 December 2025 3	CEA Sétif	4–0	NE Bouira	Ras El Oued
10:00				Stadium: Ras El Oued Olympic Stadium

13 December 2025 4	US Biskra	14–0	CM Batna	El Kantara
10:00				Stadium: Communal Stadium

13 December 2025 5	ALS Batna	9–0	MB Rouissat	El M'Ghair
10:00				Stadium: Communal Stadium

==== Center ====
13 December 2025 6	FC Béjaïa	1–0	MC Alger	Tizi Ouzou
10:00				Stadium: 1 November 1954 Stadium

13 December 2025 7	ASE Alger Centre	2–2 (4–3 p)	ASD Tizi Ouzou	Lakhdaria
10:00				Stadium: Mansour Khodja Stadium

13 December 2025 8	FC Casbah	0–6	USM Alger	El Biar
12:00				Stadium: Abderrahmane Ibrir Stadium

==== West ====
13 December 2025 9	RS Tissemsilt	5–2	DS Tiaret	Mahdia
10:00				Stadium: Mahdia Stadium

13 December 2025 10	CSA Jawharet Canastel	1–2	MC Oran	Oran
10:00				Stadium: Kaddour Keloua Stadium

13 December 2025 11	CSB Oran	1–4	MC El Bayadh	Saïda
10:00				Stadium: Braci Brothers Stadium

=== Round of 16 ===
16 January 2026 1	USM Alger	0–0 (11–10 p)	ALS Batna	Algiers
10:00				Stadium: Omar Hamadi Stadium

16 January 2026 2	RS Tissemsilt	1–3	MC Oran	Tissemsilt
10:00				Stadium: Djilali Bounaama Stadium

16 January 2026 3	ASE Alger Centre	1–1 (4–3 p)	FC Béjaïa	Dar El Beïda
10:00				Stadium: Mohamed Cherif Meziane Stadium

16 January 2026 4	CR Belouizdad	1–1 (5–6 p)	JS Kabylie	Algiers
10:00				Stadium: 20 August 1955 Stadium

16 January 2026 5	AR Guelma	0–4	JF Khroub	Guelma
10:00				Stadium: Boudjemaa Souidani Stadium

16 January 2026 6	CS Constantine	3–0 (Withraw)	MC El Bayadh	Constantine
10:00				Stadium: Ramdane Ben Abdelmalek Stadium

16 January 2026 7	Afak Relizane	2–1	CF Akbou	Relizane
10:00				Stadium: Tahar Zoughari Stadium

16 January 2026 8	US Biskra	0–0 (2–4 p)	CEA Sétif	El Hadjeb
14:00				Stadium: El Hadjeb Communal Stadium

=== Quarter-finals ===
5 February 2026 QF1	USM Alger	0–2	MC Oran	Algiers
15:00				Stadium: Omar Hamadi Stadium

5 February 2026 QF2	ASE Alger Centre	1–3	JS Kabylie	Dar El Beïda
13:00				Stadium: Mohamed Cherif Meziane Stadium

7 February 2026 QF3	JF Khroub	2–0	CS Constantine	El Khroub
10:00				Stadium: Abed Hamdani Stadium

7 February 2026 QF4	Afak Relizane	5–0	CEA Sétif	Relizane
10:00				Stadium: Tahar Zoughari Stadium

=== Semi-finals ===
3 March 2026 SF1	MC Oran	0–5	JS Kabylie	Oran
22:00			R. Baki 19', 47'; G. Ganouche 29'; A. Hemour 53'; K. Safa 76'	Stadium: Ahmed Zabana Stadium; Attendance: 1,000

27 March 2026 SF2	JF Khroub	1–3	Afak Relizane	El Khroub
10:00	? 82'		? 30'; ? 67'; ? 86'	Stadium: Abed Hamdani Stadium; Attendance: 1,000; Referee: Ghada Mehat

=== Final ===
25 April 2026
17:00

JS Kabylie	1–0	Afak Relizane
Ganouche 59' (pen.)

Mustapha Tchaker Stadium, Blida
Referee: Haoua Benrachi

== See also ==
- 2025–26 Algerian Women's Championship
- 2025–26 Algerian Women's Championship D2
