= 2026–27 Algerian Women's Championship =

Elite National Championship
- Season: 2026–27
- Dates: 2 October 2026 –
- All statistics correct as of 20 June 2026.

The 2026–27 Elite National Championship is the 29th season of the Algerian Women's Championship, the Algerian national women's association football competition. The winners of the competition will partiticipate to the 2027 CAF Women's Champions League. The competition will beggin on 2 October 2026

== Clubs ==
=== Changes ===
| ▲ from 2025–26 National Championship D2 | ▼ to 2025–26 National Championship D2 |
|---|---|
| JS Saoura; MC Alger; MC Oran; USM Alger | AR Guelma; ALS Batna; RS Tissemsilt; AC Biskra |

=== Stadiums and locations ===
Locations of the 2026–27 Elite National Championship

| Team | City | Stadium | Capacity |
|---|---|---|---|
| CF Akbou | Akbou | 1 November 1954 Stadium | 2,000 |
| ASE Alger Centre | Algiers | El Mokrani Stadium | 2,000 |
| CR Belouizdad | Algiers | 20 August 1955 Stadium | 15,000 |
| MC Alger | Algiers | Aït El Hocine Stadium | 3,000 |
| USM Alger | Algiers | Omar Hamadi Stadium | 10,000 |
| JS Saoura | Béchar | 10.000 Places Stadium (Touggourt) | 10,000 |
| FC Béjaïa | Béjaïa | Naceria Communal Stadium | |
| US Biskra | Biskra | Noureddine Mennani Stadium | 12,000 |
| CS Constantine | Constantine | Ramadane Ben Abdelmalek Stadium | 13,000 |
| JF Khroub | El Khroub | Abed Hamdani Stadium | 10,000 |
| MC Oran | Oran | Ahmed Zabana Stadium | 40,000 |
| Afak Relizane | Relizane | Tahar Zoughari Stadium | 30,000 |
| CEA Sétif | Sétif | Mohamed Guessab Stadium | 4,000 |
| JS Kabylie | Tizi Ouzou | 1 November 1954 Stadium | 21,240 |

== Regular season ==
=== Standings ===
| Pos | Team | Pld | W | D | L | GF | GA | GD | Pts | Qualification or relegation |
|---|---|---|---|---|---|---|---|---|---|---|
| 1 | JS Kabylie | 8 | 8 | 0 | 0 | 40 | 2 | +38 | 24 | Qualification for 2027 CAF W-CL |
| 2 | CF Akbou | 8 | 8 | 0 | 0 | 33 | 3 | +30 | 24 | |
| 3 | CEA Sétif | 8 | 7 | 0 | 1 | 26 | 5 | +21 | 21 | |
| 4 | Afak Relizane | 8 | 6 | 0 | 2 | 23 | 6 | +17 | 18 | |
| 5 | MC Oran | 8 | 5 | 1 | 2 | 18 | 6 | +12 | 16 | |
| 6 | CR Belouizdad | 8 | 3 | 2 | 3 | 9 | 11 | −2 | 11 | |
| 7 | ASE Alger Centre | 8 | 3 | 2 | 3 | 6 | 17 | −11 | 11 | |
| 8 | USM Alger | 8 | 3 | 1 | 4 | 7 | 12 | −5 | 10 | |
| 9 | CS Constantine | 8 | 2 | 1 | 5 | 6 | 21 | −15 | 7 | |
| 10 | US Biskra | 8 | 2 | 0 | 6 | 4 | 16 | −12 | 6 | |
| 11 | MC Alger | 8 | 2 | 0 | 6 | 7 | 24 | −17 | 6 | |
| 12 | JF Khroub | 8 | 1 | 2 | 5 | 7 | 19 | −12 | 5 | Relegation to 2027–28 D1 National Champ. |
| 13 | JS Saoura | 8 | 1 | 0 | 7 | 3 | 24 | −21 | 3 | Relegation to 2027–28 D1 National Champ. |
| 14 | FC Béjaïa | 8 | 0 | 1 | 7 | 3 | 26 | −23 | 1 | Relegation to 2027–28 D1 National Champ. |

Updated to match(es) played on 20 November 2026. Source: lnff.dz
Rules for classification: 1) Points; 2) Results between teams 3) Goal difference; 4) Number of goals scored

=== Results ===
| Home \ Away | JSK | CFA | CEAS | AR | MCO | CRB | ASAC | USMA | CSC | USB | MCA | JFK | JSS | FCB |
|---|---|---|---|---|---|---|---|---|---|---|---|---|---|---|
| JS Kabylie | | | | | | | | | 2–0 | | 3–0 | 5–0 | 7–0 | |
| CF Akbou | | | | | 2–1 | 3–0 | | | | | | | | 4–0 |
| CEA Sétif | | 2–3 | | 3–1 | | 1–0 | | | | | | | | 5–0 |
| Afak Relizane | 2–3 | | | | 1–0 | | 4–0 | | | 3–0 | 5–0 | | | |
| MC Oran | | | | | | | | | 3–0 | | 4–1 | 4–1 | | |
| CR Belouizdad | 0–3 | | | | 1–1 | | | | 1–0 | 2–1 | | | | |
| ASE Alger Centre | 0–10 | | | | | | | | | | 1–0 | 2–1 | 2–0 | |
| USM Alger | | | | 0–4 | | 0–3 | 0–0 | | | | | | | 1–0 |
| CS Constantine | | 0–8 | 1–5 | | | | | | | | | 0–0 | | |
| US Biskra | | 0–4 | | | 0–2 | | 1–0 | 0–2 | 1–3 | | | | | |
| MC Alger | | 0–5 | 0–6 | | | | | 2–0 | | | | | 4–0 | |
| JF Khroub | | 0–4 | 0–1 | | | 2–2 | | 3–1 | | | | | | |
| JS Saoura | | | 0–3 | 0–3 | | | | 0–3 | | 0–1 | | | | 3–1 |
| FC Béjaïa | 0–7 | | | | 0–3 | | 1–1 | | 1–2 | | | | | |

Updated to match(es) played on 20 November 2026. Source: lnff.dz
Legend: Blue = home team win; Yellow = draw; Red = away team win.

== Clubs season-progress ==
| Team ╲ Round | 1 | 2 | 3 | 4 | 5 | 6 | 7 | 8 | 9 | 10 | 11 | 12 | 13 | 14 | 15 | 16 | 17 | 18 | 19 | 20 | 21 | 22 | 23 | 24 | 25 | 26 |
|---|---|---|---|---|---|---|---|---|---|---|---|---|---|---|---|---|---|---|---|---|---|---|---|---|---|---|
| Afak Relizane | W | L | L | W | W | W | W | W | | | | | | | | | | | | | | | | | | |
| AS Alger Centre | L | D | L | W | L | W | D | W | | | | | | | | | | | | | | | | | | |
| CEA Setif | W | W | W | W | W | W | W | L | | | | | | | | | | | | | | | | | | |
| CF Akbou | W | W | W | W | W | W | W | W | | | | | | | | | | | | | | | | | | |
| CR Belouizdad | D | W | W | L | D | L | L | W | | | | | | | | | | | | | | | | | | |
| CS Constantine | W | D | L | W | L | L | L | L | | | | | | | | | | | | | | | | | | |
| FC Bejaia | L | L | L | L | L | L | D | L | | | | | | | | | | | | | | | | | | |
| JF Khroub | D | D | L | L | L | L | W | L | | | | | | | | | | | | | | | | | | |
| JS Kabylie | W | W | W | W | W | W | W | W | | | | | | | | | | | | | | | | | | |
| JS Saoura | L | L | L | L | L | L | L | W | | | | | | | | | | | | | | | | | | |
| MC Alger | L | L | L | L | W | L | W | L | | | | | | | | | | | | | | | | | | |
| MC Oran | L | W | W | W | D | W | L | W | | | | | | | | | | | | | | | | | | |
| US Biskra | L | L | W | L | W | L | L | L | | | | | | | | | | | | | | | | | | |
| USM Alger | W | D | W | L | L | W | L | L | | | | | | | | | | | | | | | | | | |

Updated to match(es) played on 20 November 2026. Source: lnff.dz
W = Win; D = Draw; L = Lose

== Positions by round ==
| Team ╲ Round | 1 | 2 | 3 | 4 | 5 | 6 | 7 | 8 | 9 | 10 | 11 | 12 | 13 | 14 | 15 | 16 | 17 | 18 | 19 | 20 | 21 | 22 | 23 | 24 | 25 | 26 |
|---|---|---|---|---|---|---|---|---|---|---|---|---|---|---|---|---|---|---|---|---|---|---|---|---|---|---|
| Afak Relizane | 6 | 8 | 8 | 8 | 5 | 5 | 4 | 4 | | | | | | | | | | | | | | | | | | |
| AS Alger Centre | 14 | 10 | 11 | 9 | 10 | 9 | 8 | 7 | | | | | | | | | | | | | | | | | | |
| CEA Setif | 3 | 3 | 3 | 2 | 3 | 3 | 3 | 3 | | | | | | | | | | | | | | | | | | |
| CF Akbou | 2 | 2 | 2 | 3 | 2 | 2 | 2 | 2 | | | | | | | | | | | | | | | | | | |
| CR Belouizdad | 7 | 5 | 5 | 7 | 6 | 7 | 7 | 6 | | | | | | | | | | | | | | | | | | |
| CS Constantine | 5 | 6 | 7 | 5 | 8 | 8 | 9 | 9 | | | | | | | | | | | | | | | | | | |
| FC Bejaia | 9 | 12 | 12 | 12 | 14 | 14 | 13 | 14 | | | | | | | | | | | | | | | | | | |
| JF Khroub | 8 | 9 | 10 | 11 | 12 | 12 | 12 | 12 | | | | | | | | | | | | | | | | | | |
| JS Kabylie | 1 | 1 | 1 | 1 | 1 | 1 | 1 | 1 | | | | | | | | | | | | | | | | | | |
| JS Saoura | 12 | 14 | 13 | 13 | 13 | 13 | 14 | 13 | | | | | | | | | | | | | | | | | | |
| MC Alger | 13 | 13 | 14 | 14 | 11 | 11 | 11 | 11 | | | | | | | | | | | | | | | | | | |
| MC Oran | 10 | 7 | 6 | 4 | 4 | 4 | 5 | 5 | | | | | | | | | | | | | | | | | | |
| US Biskra | 11 | 11 | 9 | 10 | 9 | 10 | 10 | 10 | | | | | | | | | | | | | | | | | | |
| USM Alger | 4 | 4 | 4 | 6 | 7 | 6 | 6 | 8 | | | | | | | | | | | | | | | | | | |

| Leader / CAF W-CL |
| Runners-up |
| Third place |
| Relegation to National Ch. D2 |

Updated to match(es) played on 20 November 2026. Source: lnff.dz

== See also ==
- 2026–27 Algerian Women's Cup
- 2026–27 Algerian Women's Championship D2
