= 2025–26 Algerian Women's Championship =

Elite National Championship
- Season: 2025–26
- Dates: 17 October 2025 –
- Champions: CF Akbou
- Relegated: AC Biskra; ALS Batna; AR Guelma; RS Tissemsilt
- Top goalscorer: Khouloud Ournani (50 goals).
- All statistics correct as of 17 October 2025.

The 2025–26 Elite National Championship is the 28th season of the Algerian Women's Championship, the Algerian national women's association football competition. The winners of the competition will partiticipate to the 2026 CAF Women's Champions League.

== Clubs ==
CSA Jawharat Canastel finished season as the best 2nd team ranked from 2024–25 National Championship D2 and was supposed to reach 2025–26 Elite division (D1). However, the LNFF decided to reach CR Belouizdad to the Division one.

Locations of the 2025–26 Elite National Championship

Team	City	Stadium	Capacity
CF Akbou	Akbou	1 November 1954 Stadium	2,000
ASE Alger Centre	Algiers	El Mokrani Stadium	2,000
CR Belouizdad	Algiers	20 August 1955 Stadium	15,000
ALS Batna	Batna	Hamla 3 Stadium	
FC Béjaïa	Béjaïa	Naceria Communal Stadium	
AC Biskra	Biskra	Noureddine Mennani Stadium	12,000
US Biskra	Biskra	Noureddine Mennani Stadium	12,000
CS Constantine	Constantine	Ramadane Ben Abdelmalek Stadium	13,000
AR Guelma	Guelma	Boudjemaa Souidani Stadium	15,000
JF Khroub	El Khroub	Abed Hamdani Stadium	10,000
Afak Relizane	Relizane	Tahar Zoughari Stadium	30,000
CEA Sétif	Sétif	Mohamed Guessab Stadium	4,000
RS Tissemsilt	Tissemsilt	Djilali Bounaâma Stadium	5,472
JS Kabylie	Tizi Ouzou	1 November 1954 Stadium	21,240

== Regular season ==
AC Biskra withdraw the championship after three weeks.

=== Standings ===
Pos	Team	Pld	W	D	L	GF	GA	GD	Pts	Qualification or relegation
1	CF Akbou	24	23	1	0	149	8	+141	70	Qualification for 2026 CAF W-CL
2	JS Kabylie	24	19	3	2	93	13	+80	60	
3	Afak Relizane	24	16	5	3	61	11	+50	53	
4	JF Khroub	24	16	3	5	75	17	+58	51	
5	CR Belouizdad	24	16	4	4	54	16	+38	51 (Note: CR Belouizdad were deducted 1 point because not include the U17 and U20 in the eleven last matches.)	
6	CS Constantine	24	12	4	8	43	35	+8	40	
7	ASE Alger Centre	24	9	1	14	43	81	−38	28	
8	US Biskra	24	8	4	12	27	50	−23	27 (Note: US Biskra were deducted 1 point because not include the U17 and U20 in the eleven last matches.)	
9	CEA Sétif	24	6	6	12	21	39	−18	24	
10	FC Béjaïa	24	4	4	16	17	60	−43	16	
11	AR Guelma	24	4	1	19	14	66	−52	8 (Note: AR Guelma were deducted 5 points because not include the U17 and U20 in the eleven last matches.)	Relegation to 2026–27 National Champ. D2
12	ALS Batna	24	1	3	20	14	120	−106	6	Relegation to 2026–27 National Champ. D2
13	RS Tissemsilt	24	1	3	20	13	108	−95	1 (Note: RS Tissemsilt were deducted 5 points because not include the U17 and U20 in the nine last matches.)	Relegation to 2026–27 National Champ. D2
14	AC Biskra	0	0	0	0	0	0	0	0	General withdraw

Updated to match(es) played on June 9, 2026. Source: lnff.dz
Rules for classification: 1) Points; 2) Results between teams 3) Goal difference; 4) Number of goals scored

=== Results ===
Home \ Away	CFA	JSK	AR	JFK	CRB	CSC	ASAC	USB	CEAS	FCB	ARG	ALSB	RST	ACB
CF Akbou		5–1	1–0	1–0	2–1	2–0	14–2	8–0	6–0	7–0	10–0	12–0	15–0	–
JS Kabylie	1–2		1–0	2–0	2–0	3–0	10–0	6–0	3–0	5–1	1–0	6–0	11–0	13–0
Afak Relizane	0–1	0–0		3–0	3–3	2–0	5–1	2–0	3–0	4–0	3–0	6–0	6–1	–
JF Khroub	1–1	0–0	0–1		0–0	2–0	5–1	6–0	3–1	5–0	6–0	5–1	8–1	–
CR Belouizdad	0–3	2–2	0–0	1–0		4–0	4–0	2–0	2–1	4–0	2–0	9–1	4–1	–
CS Constantine	1–6	0–3	2–2	0–2	1–0		2–0	1–0	0–0	4–0	4–1	5–0	2–1	–
ASE Alger Centre	0–13	2–4	1–5	3–4	0–2	1–3		1–3	2–1	4–0	3–0	6–0	3–0	–
US Biskra	0–3	0–6	0–0	1–2	0–2	1–1	2–2		3–1	0–2	1–0	4–0	3–0	–
CEA Sétif	0–2	0–4	0–2	0–1	0–1	2–2	3–1	0–0		1–0	2–1	2–0	3–0	–
FC Béjaïa	0–6	0–2	0–1	0–4	0–1	1–3	0–2	4–1	0–0		2–1	1–1	1–1	–
AR Guelma	0–3	0–4	0–4	0–5	0–1	2–3	0–3	0–3	1–1	2–1		3–0	1–0	–
ALS Batna	0–18	1–9	0–6	0–7	0–3	0–5	1–3	1–2	1–2	1–1	3–0		0–2	–
RS Tissemsilt	1–8	0–7	0–3	0–9	0–6	0–4	0–2	0–3	1–1	0–3	1–2	3–3		–
~~AC Biskra~~	–	–	–	–	–	–	0–3	0–3	–	–	–	–	–	

Updated to match(es) played on May 9, 2026. Source: lnff.dz
Legend: Blue = home team win; Yellow = draw; Red = away team win.

== See also ==
- 2025–26 Algerian Women's Championship D2
- 2025–26 Algerian Women's Cup
