= 2024–25 Algerian Women's Cup =

Tournament details
- Country: Algeria
- Dates: TBC – TBC
- Teams: 30
- All statistics correct as of 29 November 2024. Goals scored in penalty shoot-outs not included.

the 2024–25 Algerian Women's Cup is the 24th season of the annual Algerian women's association football cup competition. Thirteen teams participated in the competition. CF Akbou are the defending champions, having beaten CS Constantine on penalties free kicks 5–4 after a 0–0 draw in the 2024 final.

== Teams ==
Round	Clubs remaining	Clubs involved	Winners from previous round	New entries this round	Leagues entering at this round
Regional rounds
First round	28	–	–	–	D1 National Championship
National rounds
Second round	24	24	14	7	Elite National Championship
Round of 16	16	16	16	4	Afak Relizane, CF Akbou, CS Constantine, ASE Béjaïa
Quarter-finals	8	8	8	none	none
Semi-finals	4	4	4	none	none
Final	2	2	2	none	none

== Knockout stage ==
=== First round ===
13 December 2024 1	AS Intissar Oran	0–6	RS Tissemsilt	Oran
--:--

2024 2	SF El Attaf	–	MAB Oran
--:--

2024 3	MC El Bayadh	–	CSJ Canastel	El Bayadh
--:--

2024 4	CA Mostaganem	Not played	ES Mostaganem	Mostaganem
--:--

2024 5	O. M'Chedallah	–	AR Tebessa	Chorfa
--:--				Stadium: Chorfa Stadium

2024 6	SF Oum El Bouaghi	4–2	MF Bouchegouf	Oum El Bouaghi
--:--

2024 7	CM Batna	1–2	ALS Batna	Batna
--:--

2024 8	NC Magra	–	NE Bouira	Magra
--:--

2024 9	CVR Blida	–	CR Belouizdad	Blida
--:--

14 December 2024 10	ASD Tizi Ouzou	0–7	JS Kabylie	Tizi Ouzou
--:--

2024 11	USM Alger	–	FC Casbah	Algiers
--:--

2024 12	US Ouled Fayet	–	MC Alger
--:--

2024 13	AC Biskra	–	JS Saoura	Biskra
--:--

13 December 2024 14	EFJB Ouargla	9–0	UMA Djelfa	Ouargla
--:--

=== Second round ===
26 December 2024 15	O. M'Chedallah	0–2	CEA Setif	Chorfa
10:00				Stadium: Chorfa Stadium

26 December 2024 16	MC Alger	5–2	SF Oum El Bouaghi	Baraki
10:00				Stadium: Ait El Hocine Stadium

26 December 2024 17	ASE Alger Centre	11–0	MC El Bayadh	Ben Aknoun
10:00				Stadium: El Mokrani Stadium

26 December 2024 18	MAB Oran	1–1 (– p)	USM Alger	Es Senia
10:00				Stadium: Bahi Ammar Stadium

19	Winners 4	Exempt	US Biskra

26 December 2024 20	ES Sétif	1–1 (– p)	AC Biskra	Sétif
10:00				Stadium: 8 May 1945 Stadium

26 December 2024 21	CFN Boumerdes	2–0	Winners 8	Boumerdes
10:00				Stadium: Djilali Bounaama Stadium

26 December 2024 22	ALS Batna	12–0	CSA MC Aïn Arbaa	Batna
10:00				Stadium: Hamla 3 Stadium

26 December 2024 23	RS Tissemsilt	2–2 (– p)	AR Guelma	Tissemsilt
10:00				Stadium: Souidani Boudjemaâ Stadium

26 December 2024 24	AS Oran Centre	0–4	CR Belouizdad	Oran
10:00				Stadium: Kaddour Kelloua Stadium

28 December 2024 25	JF Khroub	6–0	FC Béjaïa	El Khroub
10:00	Hafida Boussetouh 3', 65'; Chaimaa Abdessalam 9', 83', 85'; Mahbouba Bekouche 68'			Stadium: Abed Hamdani Stadium

26 December 2024 26	JS Kabylie	14–0	EFJB Ouargla	Tizi Ouzou
10:00				Stadium: 1 November 1954 Stadium

=== Round of 16 ===
24 January 2025 1	ES Sétif	0–19	JS Kabylie	Sétif
14:30				Stadium: 8 May 1945 Stadium

24 January 2025 2	JF Khroub	1–0	CS Constantine	El Khroub
14:30				Stadium: Abed Hamdani Stadium

24 January 2025 3	Afak Relizane	3–0	AS Évasion Béjaïa	Relizane
10:00				Stadium: Tahar Zoughari Stadium

24 January 2025 4	ALS Batna	0–4	ASE Alger Centre	Batna
10:00				Stadium: Hamla 3 Stadium

25 January 2025 5	CFN Boumerdes	1–5	CR Belouizdad	Boumerdes
13:00				Stadium: Djilali Bounaâma Stadium

24 January 2025 6	MC Alger	0–1	RS Tissemsilt	Baraki
10:00				Stadium: Ait El Hocine Stadium

25 January 2025 7	CF Akbou	13–0	USM Alger	Akbou
14:30				Stadium: OPOD Guendouza Stadium

24 January 2025 8	US Biskra	0–0 (– p)	CEA Setif	Biskra
14:30				Stadium: Noureddine Mennani Stadium

=== Quarter-finals ===
8 February 2025 QF1	JS Kabylie	0–0 (a.e.t.) (– p)	JF Khroub	Tizi Ouzou
--:--				Stadium: 1 November 1954 Stadium

7 February 2025 QF2	Afak Relizane	3–0	ASE Alger Centre	Relizane
--:--				Attendance: Tahar Zoughari Stadium

7 February 2025 QF3	CR Belouizdad	4–0	RS Tissemsilt	Algiers
--:--				Stadium: 20 August 1955 Stadium

8 February 2025 QF4	CF Akbou	1–0	US Biskra	Akbou
--:--				Stadium: OPOD Guendouza Stadium

=== Semi-finals ===
12 April 2025 SF1	JS Kabylie	1–1 (a.e.t.) (3–0 p)	Afak Relizane	Tizi Ouzou
--:--				Stadium: 1 November 1954 Stadium

12 April 2025 SF2	CR Belouizdad	0–8	CF Akbou	Algiers
--:--				Stadium: 20 August 1955 Stadium

=== Final ===
1 May 2025
17:00

JS Kabylie	3–1	CF Akbou
Baki 21'; Ganouch 28'; Keddache 90+5'		Bara 55'

Mustapha Tchaker Stadium, Blida
Referee: Ghada Mehat

== See also ==
- 2024–25 Algerian Women's Championship
