= 2024–25 Algerian Women's Championship =

Elite National Championship
- Season: 2024–25
- Dates: 25 October 2024 –
- Top goalscorer: Ouassila Alouache (30 goals).
- All statistics correct as of 17 October 2024.

The 2024–25 Elite National Championship is the 27th season of the Algerian Women's Championship, the Algerian national women's association football competition. The winners of the competition will partiticipate to the 2025 CAF Women's Champions League.

== Clubs ==
Locations of the 2024–25 Elite National Championship

CF Ténès postponed the championship.

Team	City	Stadium	Capacity
CF Akbou	Akbou	1 November 1954 Stadium	2 000
ASE Alger Centre	Algiers	El Mokrani Stadium	2 000
AS Evasion Béjaïa	Béjaïa	Saleḥ Ben Allouache Stadium	
FC Béjaïa	Béjaïa	Naceria Communal Stadium	
US Biskra	Biskra	Noureddine Mennani Stadium	12 000
CS Constantine	Constantine	Ramadane Ben Abdelmalek Stadium	13 000
AR Guelma	Guelma	Boudjemaa Souidani Stadium	15 000
JF Khroub	El Khroub	Abed Hamdani Stadium	10 000
AS Oran Centre	Oran	Kaddour Kelloua Stadium	4 000
Afak Relizane	Relizane	Tahar Zoughari Stadium	30 000
CEA Sétif	Sétif	Mohamed Guessab Stadium	4 000
CF Ténès (withdraw)	Ténès	Gheddab Sahnoune Stadium (Chlef)	

== Regular season ==
=== Standings ===
Pos	Team	Pld	W	D	L	GF	GA	GD	Pts	Qualification or relegation
1	CF Akbou	20	20	0	0	140	7	+133	60	Qualification for 2025 CAF W-CL
2	Afak Relizane	20	16	1	3	80	12	+68	49	
3	JF Khroub	20	15	2	3	65	19	+46	47	
4	US Biskra	20	12	3	5	32	17	+15	39	
5	ASE Alger Centre	20	6	4	10	22	27	−5	22	
6	CEA Sétif	20	5	5	10	14	37	−23	20	
7	CS Constantine	20	5	5	10	20	52	−32	19 (Note: AS Oran Centre and CS Constantine were deducted 1 point.)	
8	FC Béjaïa	20	4	5	11	14	28	−14	17	
9	AR Guelma	20	4	4	12	14	59	−45	16	
10	AS Evasion Béjaïa	20	3	4	13	11	67	−56	13	Relegation to 2025–26 D1 National Champ.
11	AS Oran Centre	20	1	5	14	19	106	−87	7	Relegation to 2025–26 D1 National Champ.
12	CF Ténès	0	0	0	0	0	0	0	0	General withdraw

Updated to match(es) played on May 22, 2025. Source: lnff.dz
Rules for classification: 1) Points; 2) Results between teams 3) Goal difference; 4) Number of goals scored

=== Results ===
Home \ Away	CFA	AR	USB	JFK	ASAC	CEAS	CSC	ASEB	ARG	FCB	ASOC
CF Akbou	—	2–1	4–0	7–1	5–0	5–0	8–0	16–0	12–0	1–0	28–0
Afak Relizane	1–2	—	3–0	0–0	3–2	6–0	6–0	7–0	3–0	1–0	11–2
US Biskra	1–2	0–1	—	1–2	1–0	1–0	4–0	2–0	3–0	2–1	3–1
JF Khroub	2–4	3–1	0–1	—	1–1	4–0	3–1	5–1	5–0	2–1	8–0
ASE Alger Centre	0–3	0–6	0–1	0–1	—	2–0	0–1	0–0	2–0	0–2	5–1
CEA Sétif	0–2	1–6	1–1	0–3	0–2	—	1–1	2–0	2–0	1–0	2–2
CS Constantine	1–6	0–1	1–1	1–7	0–0	0–2	—	1–0	1–4	3–1	2–2
AS Evasion Béjaïa	0–13	0–7	0–3	0–2	1–0	0–0	3–0	—	0–0	2–2	3–1
AR Guelma	0–9	0–4	0–4	0–6	1–1	0–1	2–2	1–0	—	0–0	3–0
FC Béjaïa	0–2	0–4	0–0	0–2	0–4	1–0	0–2	2–0	2–0	—	0–0
AS Oran Centre	0–9	0–8	1–3	0–8	0–3	1–1	1–3	3–1	2–3	2–2	—

Updated to match(es) played on May 22, 2025. Source: lnff.dz
Legend: Blue = home team win; Yellow = draw; Red = away team win.

== See also ==
- 2024–25 Algerian Women's Cup
