= 2023–24 Algerian Women's Championship =

Elite National Championship
- Season: 2023–24
- Dates: 1 December 2023 –
- Matches: 5
- Goals: 16 (3.2 per match)
- Biggest home win: CS Constantine 1–0 JF Khroub (1 December 2023)
- Biggest away win: MZ Biskra 0–6 ASE Alger Centre (1 December 2023)
- Highest scoring: MZ Biskra 0–6 ASE Alger Centre (1 December 2023)
- All statistics correct as of 1 December 2023.

The 2023–24 Elite National Championship is the 26th season of the Algerian Women's Championship, the Algerian national women's association football competition. The winners of the competition will partiticipate to the 2024 CAF Women's Champions League.

== Clubs ==
Locations of the 2023–24 Elite National Championship

Team	City	Stadium	Capacity
CF Akbou	Akbou	1 November 1954 Stadium	2 000
ASE Alger Centre	Algiers	El Mokrani Stadium	2 000
CR Belouizdad	Algiers	20 August 1955 Stadium	15 000
AS Evasion Béjaïa	Béjaïa	Saleḥ Ben Allouache Stadium	
USF Béjaïa	Béjaïa	Naceria Communal Stadium	
MZ Biskra	Biskra	Noureddine Mennani Stadium	12 000
CS Constantine	Constantine	Ramadane Ben Abdelmalek Stadium	13 000
JF Khroub	El Khroub	Abed Hamdani Stadium	10 000
AR Guelma	Guelma	Boudjemaa Souidani Stadium	15 000
Afak Relizane	Relizane	Tahar Zoughari Stadium	30 000

== Standings ==
Pos	Team	Pld	W	D	L	GF	GA	GD	Pts	Qualification or relegation	CFA	JFK	CSC	ASAC	CRB	AR	ASEB	USFB	MZB	ARG
1	CF Akbou (C)	18	15	2	1	79	5	+74	47	Qualification for 2024 CAF W-CL	—	0–1	3–0	5–0	2–0	1–1	7–0	6–0	6–0	12–0
2	JF Khroub	18	13	1	4	70	13	+57	40		1–2	—	2–2	4–0	3–1	1–0	7–1	11–1	5–0	13–0
3	CS Constantine	18	12	1	5	38	17	+21	37		0–3	1–0	—	0–2	1–2	2–0	3–1	7–0	5–0	5–0
4	ASE Alger Centre	18	12	1	5	36	16	+20	37		0–1	1–0	0–2	—	1–1	1–0	5–0	5–0	2–0	2–0
5	CR Belouizdad	18	11	3	4	45	17	+28	36		1–2	1–2	2–0	2–0	—	2–2	7–2	3–0	2–1	7–0
6	Afak Relizane	18	9	3	6	29	15	+14	30		1–1	2–1	0–1	1–2	1–3	—	3–0	3–0	1–0	3–0
7	AS Evasion Béjaïa	18	3	2	13	13	54	−41	11		0–7	0–4	0–1	0–2	0–1	0–2	—	1–1	2–0	2–1
8	USF Béjaïa	18	2	3	13	9	64	−55	9		0–7	0–2	0–3	0–2	0–6	0–1	2–1	—	1–4	2–0
9	MZ Biskra	18	1	4	13	9	47	−38	7		0–4	1–5	2–3	0–6	0–0	0–3	1–1	0–0	—	0–1
10	AR Guelmalol	18	1	2	15	4	84	−80	5		0–10	0–8	0–2	0–5	0–4	0–5	0–2	2–2	0–0	—

Updated to match(es) played on 17 February 2024. Source: lnff.dz
Rules for classification: 1) Points; 2) Results between teams 3) Goal difference; 4) Number of goals scored
(C) Champions

== Matches ==
=== First leg ===
Matches - 1st leg
1st day

December 1, 2023 1	CR Belouizdad	1–2	CF Akbou	Algiers
9:00 DPRA				Stadium: 20 August 1955 Stadium

December 1, 2023 1	MZ Biskra	0–6	ASE Alger Centre	Biskra
10:00 DPRA				Stadium: Noureddine Mennani Stadium

December 1, 2023 1	AR Guelma	2–2	USF Béjaïa	Guelma
9:00 DPRA				Stadium: Boudjemaa Souidani Stadium

December 1, 2023 1	AS Evasion Béjaïa	0–2	Afak Relizane	Béjaïa
9:00 DPRA				Stadium: Saleḥ Ben Allouache Stadium

December 1, 2023 1	CS Constantine	1–0	JF Khroub	Constantine
10:00 DPRA				Stadium: Ramadane Ben Abdelmalek Stadium

2nd day

December 8, 2023 2	CF Akbou	6–0	MZ Biskra	Akbou
9:00 DPRA				Stadium: 1 November 1954 Stadium

December 8, 2023 2	USF Béjaïa	0–6	CR Belouizdad	Béjaïa
9:00 DPRA				Stadium: Naceria Communal Stadium

December 8, 2023 2	Afak Relizane	0–1	CS Constantine	Relizane
9:00 DPRA				Stadium: Tahar Zoughari Stadium

December 8, 2023 2	ASE Alger Centre	5–0	AS Evasion Béjaïa	Algiers
10:00 DPRA				Stadium: El Mokrani Stadium

December 9, 2023 2	JF Khroub	13–0	AR Guelma	El Khroub
11:00 DPRA				Stadium: Abed Hamdani Stadium

3rd day

December 15, 2023 3	CF Akbou	6–0	USF Béjaïa	Akbou
--:-- DPRA				Stadium: 1 November 1954 Stadium

December 15, 2023 3	AS Evasion Béjaïa	2–0	MZ Biskra	Béjaïa
--:-- DPRA				Stadium: Saleḥ Ben Allouache Stadium

December 15, 2023 3	CR Belouizdad	1–2	JF Khroub	Algiers
--:-- DPRA				Stadium: 20 August 1955 Stadium

December 15, 2023 3	CS Constantine	0–2	ASE Alger Centre	Constantine
--:-- DPRA				Stadium: Ramadane Ben Abdelmalek Stadium

December 15, 2023 3	AR Guelma	0–5	Afak Relizane	Guelma
--:-- DPRA				Stadium: Boudjemaa Souidani Stadium

4th day

December 28, 2023 4	AS Evasion Béjaïa	0–7	CF Akbou	Béjaïa
12:00 DPRA		Report		Stadium: Saleḥ Ben Allouache Stadium

December 28, 2023 4	JF Khroub	11–1	USF Béjaïa	El Khroub
9:00 DPRA		Report		Stadium: Abed Hamdani Stadium

December 28, 2023 4	MZ Biskra	2–3	CS Constantine	Biskra
9:00 DPRA		Report		Stadium: Noureddine Mennani Stadium

December 28, 2023 4	Afak Relizane	1–3	CR Belouizdad	Relizane
9:00 DPRA		Report		Stadium: Tahar Zoughari Stadium

December 28, 2023 4	ASE Alger Centre	2–0	AR Guelma	Algiers
10:00 DPRA		Report		Stadium: El Mokrani Stadium

5th day

January 4, 2024 5	CF Akbou	0–1	JF Khroub	Akbou
11:00 DPRA		Report		Stadium: OPOD Guendouza Stadium

January 4, 2024 5	CS Constantine	3–1	AS Evasion Béjaïa	Constantine
9:00 DPRA		Report		Stadium: Ramadane Ben Abdelmalek Stadium

January 5, 2024 5	USF Béjaïa	0–1	Afak Relizane	Béjaïa
9:00 DPRA		Report		Stadium: Naceria Communal Stadium

January 5, 2024 5	AR Guelma	0–0	MZ Biskra	Guelma
9:00 DPRA		Report		Stadium: Boudjemaa Souidani Stadium

January 5, 2024 5	CR Belouizdad	2–0	ASE Alger Centre	Algiers
9:00 DPRA		Report		Stadium: 20 August 1955 Stadium

6th day

January 12, 2024 6	CS Constantine	0–3	CF Akbou	Constantine
--:-- DPRA				Stadium: Ramadane Ben Abdelmalek Stadium

January 12, 2024 6	Afak Relizane	2–1	JF Khroub	Relizane
--:-- DPRA				Stadium: Tahar Zoughari Stadium

January 12, 2024 6	AS Evasion Béjaïa	2–1	AR Guelma	Béjaïa
--:-- DPRA				Stadium: Saleḥ Ben Allouache Stadium

January 12, 2024 6	ASE Alger Centre	5–0	USF Béjaïa	Algiers
--:-- DPRA				Stadium: El Mokrani Stadium

January 12, 2024 6	MZ Biskra	0–0	CR Belouizdad	Biskra
--:-- DPRA				Stadium: Noureddine Mennani Stadium

7th day

19 January 2024 7	CF Akbou	1–1	Afak Relizane	Akbou
--:-- DPRA				Stadium: 1 November 1954 Stadium

19 January 2024 7	AR Guelma	0–2	CS Constantine	Guelma
--:-- DPRA				Stadium: Boudjemaa Souidani Stadium

19 January 2024 7	JF Khroub	4–0	ASE Alger Centre	El Khroub
10:00 UTC+1				Stadium: Abed Hamdani Stadium

19 January 2024 7	CR Belouizdad	7–2	AS Evasion Béjaïa	Algiers
--:-- DPRA				Stadium: 20 August 1955 Stadium

19 January 2024 7	USF Béjaïa	1–4	MZ Biskra	Béjaïa
--:-- DPRA				Stadium: Naceria Communal Stadium

8th day

2 February 2024 8	AR Guelma	0–10	CF Akbou	Guelma
10:00 DPRA				Stadium: Boudjemaa Souidani Stadium

2 February 2024 8	ASE Alger Centre	1–0	Afak Relizane	Algiers
10:00 DPRA				Stadium: El Mokrani Stadium

2 February 2024 8	CS Constantine	1–2	CR Belouizdad	Constantine
10:00 DPRA				Stadium: Ramadane Ben Abdelmalek Stadium

2 February 2024 8	MZ Biskra	1–5	JF Khroub	Biskra
10:00 DPRA				Stadium: Noureddine Mennani Stadium

2 February 2024 8	AS Evasion Béjaïa	1–1	USF Béjaïa	Béjaïa
10:00 DPRA				Stadium: Saleḥ Ben Allouache Stadium

9th day

16 February 2024 9	CF Akbou	5–0	ASE Alger Centre	Akbou
10:00 DPRA				Stadium: 1 November 1954 Stadium

16 February 2024 9	CR Belouizdad	7–0	AR Guelma	Algiers
10:00 DPRA				Stadium: 20 August 1955 Stadium

16 February 2024 9	Afak Relizane	1–0	MZ Biskra	Relizane
10:00 DPRA				Stadium: Tahar Zoughari Stadium

16 February 2024 9	USF Béjaïa	0–3	CS Constantine	Béjaïa
10:30 DPRA				Stadium: Naceria Communal Stadium

17 February 2024 9	JF Khroub	7–1	AS Evasion Béjaïa	El Khroub
10:00 DPRA				Stadium: Abed Hamdani Stadium

=== Second leg ===
Matches - 2nd leg
10th day

March 1, 2024 10	CF Akbou	2–0	CR Belouizdad	Akbou
10:30 DPRA				Stadium: 1 November 1954 Stadium

March 1, 2024 10	ASE Alger Centre	2–0	MZ Biskra	Algiers
10:00 DPRA				Stadium: El Mokrani Stadium

March 1, 2024 10	USF Béjaïa	2–0	AR Guelma	Béjaïa
10:00 DPRA				Stadium: Naceria Communal Stadium

March 1, 2024 10	Afak Relizane	3–0	AS Evasion Béjaïa	Relizane
10:00 DPRA				Stadium: Tahar Zoughari Stadium

March 2, 2024 10	JF Khroub	2–2	CS Constantine	El Khroub
10:00 DPRA				Stadium: Abed Hamdani Stadium

11th day

March 15, 2024 11	MZ Biskra	0–4	CF Akbou	Biskra
14:30 DPRA				Stadium: Noureddine Mennani Stadium

March 15, 2024 11	CR Belouizdad	3–0	USF Béjaïa	Algiers
14:30 DPRA				Stadium: 20 August 1955 Stadium

March 15, 2024 11	AS Evasion Béjaïa	0–2	ASE Alger Centre	Béjaïa
14:30 DPRA				Stadium: Saleḥ Ben Allouache Stadium

March 16, 2024 11	AR Guelma	0–8	JF Khroub	Guelma
14:30 DPRA				Stadium: Boudjemaa Souidani Stadium

March 15, 2024 11	CS Constantine	2–0	Afak Relizane	Constantine
14:30 DPRA				Stadium: Ramadane Ben Abdelmalek Stadium

12th day

March 22, 2024 12	USF Béjaïa	0–7	CF Akbou	Béjaïa
14:30 DPRA				Stadium: Naceria Communal Stadium

March 22, 2024 12	MZ Biskra	1–1	AS Evasion Béjaïa	Biskra
14:30 DPRA				Stadium: Noureddine Mennani Stadium

March 22, 2024 12	JF Khroub	3–1	CR Belouizdad	El Khroub
14:30 DPRA				Stadium: Abed Hamdani Stadium

March 23, 2024 12	ASE Alger Centre	0–2	CS Constantine	Algiers
14:30 DPRA				Stadium: El Mokrani Stadium

March 22, 2024 12	Afak Relizane	3–0	AR Guelma	Relizane
14:30 DPRA				Stadium: Tahar Zoughari Stadium

13th day

April 16, 2024 13	CF Akbou	7–0	AS Evasion Béjaïa	Akbou
14:00 DPRA				Stadium: 1 November 1954 Stadium

April 16, 2024 13	USF Béjaïa	0–2	JF Khroub	Béjaïa
10:00 DPRA				Stadium: Naceria Communal Stadium

April 13, 2024 13	CS Constantine	5–0	MZ Biskra	Constantine
10:00 DPRA				Stadium: Ramadane Ben Abdelmalek Stadium

April 23, 2024 13	CR Belouizdad	2–2	Afak Relizane	Algiers
09:00 DPRA				Stadium: 20 August 1955 Stadium

May 17, 2024 13	AR Guelma	0–5	ASE Alger Centre	Guelma
10:00 DPRA				Stadium: Boudjemaa Souidani Stadium

14th day

April 26, 2024 14	JF Khroub	1–2	CF Akbou	El Khroub
10:00 DPRA				Stadium: Abed Hamdani Stadium

April 26, 2024 14	AS Evasion Béjaïa	0–1	CS Constantine	Béjaïa
09:00 DPRA				Stadium: Saleḥ Ben Allouache Stadium

April 26, 2024 14	Afak Relizane	3–0	USF Béjaïa	Relizane
09:00 DPRA				Stadium: Tahar Zoughari Stadium

April 26, 2024 14	MZ Biskra	0–1	AR Guelma	Biskra
10:00 DPRA				Stadium: Noureddine Mennani Stadium

April 26, 2024 14	ASE Alger Centre	1–1	CR Belouizdad	Algiers
14:30 DPRA				Stadium: El Mokrani Stadium

15th day

May 10, 2024 15	CF Akbou	3–0	CS Constantine	Akbou
10:30 DPRA				Stadium: 1 November 1954 Stadium

May 10, 2024 15	JF Khroub	1–0	Afak Relizane	El Khroub
09:00 DPRA				Stadium: Abed Hamdani Stadium

May 10, 2024 15	AR Guelma	0–2	AS Evasion Béjaïa	Guelma
10:00 DPRA				Stadium: Boudjemaa Souidani Stadium

May 10, 2024 15	USF Béjaïa	0–2	ASE Alger Centre	Béjaïa
09:00 DPRA				Stadium: Naceria Communal Stadium

May 10, 2024 15	CR Belouizdad	2–1	MZ Biskra	Algiers
10:00 DPRA				Stadium: 20 August 1955 Stadium

16th day

May 24, 2024 16	Afak Relizane	1–1	CF Akbou	Relizane
--:-- DPRA				Stadium: Tahar Zoughari Stadium

May 24, 2024 16	CS Constantine	5–0	AR Guelma	Constantine
--:-- DPRA				Stadium: Ramadane Ben Abdelmalek Stadium

May 25, 2024 16	ASE Alger Centre	1–0	JF Khroub	Algiers
13:00 DPRA				Stadium: El Mokrani Stadium

May 24, 2024 16	AS Evasion Béjaïa	0–1	CR Belouizdad	Béjaïa
--:-- DPRA				Stadium: Saleḥ Ben Allouache Stadium

May 24, 2024 16	MZ Biskra	0–0	USF Béjaïa	Biskra
--:-- DPRA				Stadium: Noureddine Mennani Stadium

17th day

June 7, 2024 17	CF Akbou	12–0	AR Guelma	Akbou
--:-- DPRA				Stadium: 1 November 1954 Stadium

June 7, 2024 17	Afak Relizane	1–2	ASE Alger Centre	Relizane
--:-- DPRA				Stadium: Tahar Zoughari Stadium

June 7, 2024 17	CR Belouizdad	2–0	CS Constantine	Algiers
--:-- DPRA				Stadium: 20 August 1955 Stadium

June 7, 2024 17	JF Khroub	5–0	MZ Biskra	El Khroub
--:-- DPRA				Stadium: Abed Hamdani Stadium

June 7, 2024 17	USF Béjaïa	2–1	AS Evasion Béjaïa	Béjaïa
--:-- DPRA				Stadium: Naceria Communal Stadium

18th day

June 13, 2024 18	ASE Alger Centre	0–1	CF Akbou	Algiers
15:00 DPRA				Stadium: El Mokrani Stadium

June 13, 2024 18	AR Guelma	0–4	CR Belouizdad	Guelma
10:00 DPRA				Stadium: Boudjemaa Souidani Stadium

June 14, 2024 18	MZ Biskra	0–3	Afak Relizane	Biskra
10:00 DPRA				Stadium: Noureddine Mennani Stadium

June 14, 2024 18	CS Constantine	7–0	USF Béjaïa	Constantine
09:00 DPRA				Stadium: Ramadane Ben Abdelmalek Stadium

June 14, 2024 18	AS Evasion Béjaïa	0–4	JF Khroub	Béjaïa
10:00 DPRA				Stadium: Saleḥ Ben Allouache Stadium
