= 2026–27 Algerian Women's Championship D2 =

National Championship D2
- Season: 2026–27
- Dates: 17 October 2026–
- All statistics correct as of 19 October 2026.

The 2026–27 National Championship Division 2 is the 16th season of the Algerian Women's Championship D2, the Algerian national women's association football competition. The championship is reparted into three groups, East, Center and West. The winners of each group will promoted to the Women's League 1.

== Clubs ==
=== Changes ===
| ▲ to 2025–26 Elite National Championship | ▼ from 2025–26 Elite National Championship |
|---|---|
| JS Saoura; MC Alger; MC Oran; USM Alger | AR Guelma; ALS Batna; RS Tissemsilt (did not enter); AC Biskra (did not enter) |

=== stadiums and locations ===
Locations of the 2025–26 Algerian Women's Championship D2 teams
West
Center
East

==== Group 1 - east ====
| Team | Home city | Stadium | Capacity |
|---|---|---|---|
| ALS Batna | Batna | Abdellatif Chaoui Stadium (Hamla 3) | 10,000 |
| CM Batna | Batna | Abdellatif Chaoui Stadium (Hamla 3) | 10,000 |
| CSA Al Amel Bordj Bou Arreridj | Bordj Bou Arréridj | 20 August 1955 Stadium | 15,000 |
| AR Guelma | Guelma | Boudjemaa Souidani Stadium | 15,000 |
| USM Khenchela | Khenchela | Amar Hamam Stadium | 10,000 |
| MB Rouissat | Rouissat | 18 February Stadium | 18,000 |
| ES Sétif | Sétif | 8 May 1945 Stadium | 25,000 |
| CRA Témacine | Tamacine | 5.000 Places Stadium | 5,000 |
| AR Tébessa SF | Tébessa | Lazhar Benhamza Stadium | 18,000 |

==== Group 2 - centre ====
| Team | Home city | Stadium | Capacity |
|---|---|---|---|
| Olympique Akbou | Akbou | 1 November 1954 Stadium | 2,000 |
| ES Ben Aknoun | Ben Aknoun, Algiers | El Mokrani Stadium | 2,000 |
| JS El Biar | El Biar, Algiers | Abderrahmane Ibrir Stadium | 1,000 |
| AS Evasion Béjaïa | Béjaïa | Saleḥ Ben Allouache Stadium | 1,000 |
| NE Bouira | Bouira | Saïd Bourouba Stadium | 5,000 |
| Olympique M'chedallah | Bouira | Taleb Achour Zouzaman Stadium | 2,000 |
| CFN Boumerdès | Boumerdès | Meriouli Brothers Stadium | 1,000 |
| AES Souk El Tenine | Souk El-Thenine | Souk El Thenine Communal Stadium | 3,000 |
| ASD Tizi Ouzou | Tizi Ouzou | 1 November 1954 Stadium | 21,240 |

==== Group 3 - west ====
| Team | Home city | Stadium | Capacity |
|---|---|---|---|
| ECAFF Adrar | Adrar | 18 February Stadium | 15,000 |
| MC Ain El Arbaa | Ain El Arbaa | Ain El Arbaa Communal Stadium | 1,500 |
| CR Temouchent | Ain Temouchent | M'Barek Boucif | 5,000 |
| ASO Chlef | Chlef | Mohamed Boumezrag Stadium | 18,000 |
| MAB Oran | Es Senia, Oran | Bahi Brothers Stadium | 8,000 |
| FC Bel Abbès | Sidi Bel Abbès | three Amarouche Brothers Stadium | 7,000 |
| CF Ténès | Ténès | Maâmar Sahli Stadium (Chlef) | 3,000 |
| APDSF Tiaret | Tiaret | Ahmed Ait Abderrahim Stadium | 5,000 |
| DS Tiaret | Tiaret | Ahmed Kaïd Stadium | 30,000 |

== Regular season ==
=== Group 1 (East) ===
==== Standings ====
| Pos | Team | Pld | W | D | L | GF | GA | GD | Pts | Qualification or relegation |
|---|---|---|---|---|---|---|---|---|---|---|
| 1 | USM Khenchela | 5 | 4 | 1 | 0 | 26 | 7 | +19 | 13 | Promotion to 2027–28 Women's League 1 |
| 2 | MB Rouissat | 4 | 3 | 0 | 1 | 19 | 8 | +11 | 9 | |
| 3 | ALS Batna | 3 | 2 | 1 | 0 | 26 | 4 | +22 | 7 | |
| 4 | AR Tébessa SF | 4 | 2 | 0 | 2 | 11 | 6 | +5 | 6 | |
| 5 | CM Batna | 3 | 1 | 0 | 2 | 11 | 6 | +5 | 3 | |
| 6 | ES Sétif | 3 | 1 | 0 | 2 | 7 | 6 | +1 | 3 | |
| 7 | CRA Témacine | 3 | 0 | 0 | 3 | 0 | 27 | −27 | 0 | |
| 8 | CSA Al Amel Bordj Bou Arreridj | 3 | 0 | 0 | 3 | 1 | 37 | −36 | 0 | |
| 9 | AR Guelma | 0 | 0 | 0 | 0 | 0 | 0 | 0 | 0 | General withraw |

Updated to match(es) played on 20 November 2026. Source: lnff.dz
Rules for classification: 1) Points; 2) Results between teams 3) Goal difference; 4) Number of goals scored

==== Results ====
| Home \ Away | USMK | MBR | ALSB | ART | CMB | ESS | CRAT | CBBA | ARG |
|---|---|---|---|---|---|---|---|---|---|
| USM Khenchela | | 5–2 | 2–2 | | | | 13–0 | | |
| MB Rouissat | | | | 3–1 | | 3–2 | | | |
| ALS Batna | | | | | 4–1 | | | | – |
| AR Tébessa SF | 1–3 | | | | | | | 7–0 | |
| CM Batna | | | | 0–2 | | | | 10–0 | |
| ES Sétif | 2–3 | | | | | | 3–0 | | |
| CRA Témacine | | 0–11 | | | | | | | – |
| CSA Al Amel Bordj Bou Arreridj | | | 1–20 | | | | – | | |
| AR Guelma | | | | – | – | – | | | |

Updated to match(es) played on 20 November 2026. Source: lnff.dz
Legend: Blue = home team win; Yellow = draw; Red = away team win.

=== Group 2 (Center) ===
==== Standings ====
| Pos | Team | Pld | W | D | L | GF | GA | GD | Pts | Qualification or relegation |
|---|---|---|---|---|---|---|---|---|---|---|
| 1 | Olympique Akbou | 4 | 4 | 0 | 0 | 45 | 0 | +45 | 12 | Promotion to 2027–28 Women's League 1 |
| 2 | CFN Boumerdès | 4 | 3 | 1 | 0 | 28 | 2 | +26 | 10 | |
| 3 | JS El Biar | 4 | 3 | 1 | 0 | 15 | 3 | +12 | 10 | |
| 4 | NE Bouira | 5 | 2 | 1 | 2 | 8 | 26 | −18 | 7 | |
| 5 | ASD Tizi Ouzou | 4 | 2 | 0 | 2 | 24 | 6 | +18 | 6 | |
| 6 | Olympique M'chedallah | 2 | 1 | 0 | 1 | 2 | 7 | −5 | 3 | |
| 7 | ES Ben Aknoun | 3 | 0 | 1 | 2 | 0 | 2 | −2 | 1 | |
| 8 | AS Evasion Béjaïa | 4 | 0 | 0 | 4 | 1 | 33 | −32 | 0 | |
| 9 | AES Souk El Tenine | 4 | 0 | 0 | 4 | 2 | 46 | −44 | 0 | |

Updated to match(es) played on 20 November 2026. Source: lnff.dz
Rules for classification: 1) Points; 2) Results between teams 3) Goal difference; 4) Number of goals scored

==== Results ====
| Home \ Away | OA | CFNB | JSEB | NEB | ASDT | OM | ESBA | ASEB | AESS |
|---|---|---|---|---|---|---|---|---|---|
| Olympique Akbou | | | | 17–0 | | 7–0 | | | |
| CFN Boumerdès | | | 2–2 | | | | | 12–0 | |
| JS El Biar | | | | 7–0 | | | 1–0 | | |
| NE Bouira | | | | | | | 0–0 | | 5–2 |
| ASD Tizi Ouzou | 0–4 | | | | | | | 13–0 | |
| Olympique M'chedallah | | | | | 2–0 | | | | – |
| ES Ben Aknoun | | 0–1 | | | – | | | | |
| AS Evasion Béjaïa | | | 1–5 | 0–3 | | – | | | |
| AES Souk El Tenine | 0–17 | 0–13 | | | 0–11 | | | | |

Updated to match(es) played on 20 November 2026. Source: lnff.dz
Legend: Blue = home team win; Yellow = draw; Red = away team win.

=== Group 3 (West) ===
==== Standings ====
| Pos | Team | Pld | W | D | L | GF | GA | GD | Pts | Qualification or relegation |
|---|---|---|---|---|---|---|---|---|---|---|
| 1 | APDSF Tiaret | 4 | 3 | 1 | 0 | 12 | 7 | +5 | 10 | Promotion to 2027–28 Women's League 1 |
| 2 | CR Temouchent | 4 | 2 | 1 | 1 | 10 | 4 | +6 | 7 | |
| 3 | MAB Oran | 2 | 1 | 1 | 0 | 4 | 2 | +2 | 4 | |
| 4 | CF Ténès | 3 | 1 | 1 | 1 | 5 | 5 | 0 | 4 | |
| 5 | ASO Chlef | 1 | 1 | 0 | 0 | 6 | 1 | +5 | 3 | |
| 6 | ECAFF Adrar | 3 | 1 | 0 | 2 | 4 | 11 | −7 | 3 | |
| 7 | DS Tiaret | 2 | 0 | 2 | 0 | 3 | 3 | 0 | 2 | |
| 8 | FC Bel Abbès | 3 | 0 | 1 | 2 | 5 | 9 | −4 | 1 | |
| 9 | MC Ain El Arbaa | 4 | 0 | 1 | 3 | 7 | 14 | −7 | 1 | |

Updated to match(es) played on 20 November 2026. Source: lnff.dz
Rules for classification: 1) Points; 2) Results between teams 3) Goal difference; 4) Number of goals scored

==== Results ====
| Home \ Away | APDT | CRT | MABO | CFT | ASOC | ECAF | DST | FCBA | MCAA |
|---|---|---|---|---|---|---|---|---|---|
| APDSF Tiaret | | 2–1 | | | – | | | | |
| CR Temouchent | | | | | | 5–0 | 1–1 | | |
| MAB Oran | | | | 1–1 | | – | | | |
| CF Ténès | 1–3 | | | | | | | 3–1 | |
| ASO Chlef | | | – | | | 6–1 | – | | |
| ECAFF Adrar | | | | – | | | | | 3–0 |
| DS Tiaret | 2–2 | | | | | | | | – |
| FC Bel Abbès | | | 1–3 | | – | | | | |
| MC Ain El Arbaa | 3–5 | 1–3 | | | | | | 3–3 | |

Updated to match(es) played on 20 November 2026. Source: lnff.dz
Legend: Blue = home team win; Yellow = draw; Red = away team win.

== See also ==
- 2026–27 Algerian Women's Championship
- 2026–27 Algerian Women's Cup
