= Algerian Football Federation =

Sports governing body in Algeria

CAF
- Founded: 21 October 1962; 64 years ago
- Headquarters: Algiers
- FIFA affiliation: 1964
- CAF affiliation: 1964
- UNAF affiliation: 2005
- President: Walid Sadi
- Website: www.faf.dz

The Algerian Football Federation (AFF; Arabic: الاتحادية الجزائرية لكرة القدم) is the governing body of football in Algeria. Formed in 1962 and based in the capital Algiers, it has jurisdiction on the Algerian football league system and is in charge of the men's and women's national teams. Although an unofficial national team had played fixtures since 1958, the first official national team was recognized in January 1963, six months after the country gained independence. In 2021, twenty structures were added to the Algerian Football Federation. The Algerian Football Federation is considered a member of FIFA.

== History ==
The Algerian Football Federation (FAF) was founded on 21 October 1962. During this meeting, the entire football system in Algeria was rethought, the three main leagues before the independence of Algeria were kept, but were named in the West Region (former Oran League), Center Region (former Algiers League) and East Region (former Constantine League). The official colors of the national team (red, white and green) and also the project of affiliation with FIFA were designated.

== Competitions ==
=== Football ===
==== Men's football ====
Men's competitions
Category	Organising body	competitions
Professional leagues	LFP	Ligue 1 Pro.
Amateur leagues	LNFA	League 2
Amateur leagues	LIRF	Interregional
Amateur leagues	Multiple regional leagues	Régional I
Amateur leagues	Multiple regional leagues	Régional II
Amateur leagues	Multiple province leagues	Wilayas HD
Amateur leagues	Multiple province leagues	Wilayas PHD
Cups	FAF	Algerian Cup
Cups	FAF	Algerian Super Cup
Cups	FAF	Algerian League Cup

==== Women's football ====
Women's competitions
Category	Organising body	competitions
Amateur W-leagues	LNFF	Elite National Championship
Amateur W-leagues	LNFF	National Championship D2
Amateur W-leagues	LNFF	National Championship D3
W-Cups	FAF	Algerian W-Cup
W-Cups	FAF	Algerian W-Super Cup
W-Cups	FAF	Algerian W-League Cup

==== Youth football ====
Similar as senior competitions.

=== Futsal ===
==== Men's futsal ====
Futsal competitions
Category	Organising body	competitions
Amateur futsal	LNFS	Futsal Championship
Amateur futsal	LNFS	Futsal Championship N2
Amateur futsal	FAF	Futsal Cup

==== Women's futsal ====
Futsal competitions
Category	Organising body	competitions
Amateur W-futsal	LNFS	W-Futsal Championship
Amateur W-futsal	FAF	W-Futsal Cup

== Sponsors ==
- Mobilis
- Sonatrach
- Groupe SERPORT
- Chery
- Adidas
- Aspetar
- El Rayan Healthcare
