= List of programs broadcast by Echorouk TV =

This is a list of programs broadcast by Echourouk TV.

== Programs ==
Program title		Content	Host(s)	Air date(s)			Current
Original	English	Content	Host(s)	Date	Original	Rerun	Current
Aṭ-Ṭaqs	Weather	Weather news	Cheikh Ferhat		Everyday	—N/a	Yes
Ṣabāḥ Echourouk	Echourouk's Morning	Morning show	—N/a		—N/a	—N/a	Yes (Season 3)
Green Mag	Green Mag	Environmental magazine	Hassiba Ibelaidane		Sundays; 5.30PM (AST)	—N/a	Yes
Ḥkī Ḥkāytek	Tell Your Story	Social magazine	Youssef Nekkaa		Tuesdays; 9.05PM (AST)	Wednesdays; 4PM (AST)	Yes
Al-Ḥalaqah al-Mafqūdah	The Lost Circle	Social magazine	—N/a		—N/a	—N/a	Yes
Al-Māher	The Skilled	Religious series	Yacine El Djazairi		Fridays; 5.15PM (AST)	—N/a	Yes
Al-Menshār	The Saw	Satiric series	Salim Medjahed		Everyday; 10.30PM	—N/a	Yes
Khaṭṭ Aḥmar	Red Line	Social magazine	Fadhila Mokhtari		Sundays; 9.15PM (AST)	Mondays; 4PM (AST)	Yes
Kheyrāt Blādī	My Country's Richnesses	Focuses on Agronomy and food	—N/a		Saturdays; 5.30 (AST)	—N/a	Yes
Zidnī	Give Me More	Game show	Slimane Bekhlili		Fridays; 9.15PM (AST)	Saturdays; 3PM (AST)	Yes
Star News	Star News	Star News	Samia Chemas		Mondays; 10.30PM (AST)	—N/a	Upcoming
Fa ’Is’alū Ahl az-Zikr	Ask Those Who Know	Fatwā show	—N/a		Fridays; 7PM (AST)	Sundays; 11AM (AST)	Yes
Fa Firrū Ilā Allāh	So Flee to Allah	Religious series	Cheikh Abu Musilim Bellehmer		Sundays; 10.30PM (AST)	—N/a	Yes
Kūzīnah Sans Visa	Cuisine Without Visa	World cuisine	A group of chefs		Everyday; 2PM (AST)	—N/a	Yes
Maẓāmīr Dāwūd	Psalms of David	Religious series	Redouane Houcine		Fridays; 8PM (AST)	Mondays; 10.30PM (AST)	Yes
M‘a ‘Ammū Yazid	With Oncle Yazid	Children program	Cheb Yazid		Tuesdays; 5PM (AST)	Saturdays; 10.30AM (AST)	Yes
Forum Echourouk	Echourouk's Forum	Current affairs talk show	—N/a		—N/a	—N/a	Yes
Hāzihi Ḥayātī	This Is My Life	Jetset	Toufik Fodil		Wednesdays; 7.15PM (AST)	Thursdays; 4PM (AST)	Yes
Wa ’If‘alū al-Khayr	And Do Good	Social magazine	Toumi Ayad El Ahmadi		Saturdays; 9.15PM (AST)	Sundays; 4PM (AST)	Yes
‘Aqārukum	Your real estate	Real estates	Nadjib Idris		Wednesdays; 5.30PM (AST)	Wednesdays; 10.05PM (AST); Saturdays; 2.30PM (AST)	Yes
MasterChef	MasterChef	Cooking reality show	Tayeb Kaci Abdellah		Saturdays; 8.45PM (AST)	—N/a	No
Yawmiyyāt MasterChef	MasterChef: Dailies	Spin-off of MasterChef	Rabah Ourrad; Yasmina Sellam		Everyday; 1PM (AST)	—N/a	No
Eddī Wellā Khellī	Deal or No Deal	Game show	Sofiane Dani		—N/a	Everyday; 1.15PM (AST)	Yes
Iftaḥ Qalbek	Open Your Heart	Psychosocial reality show	Salima Souakri		Thursdays; 9PM (AST)	—N/a	Yes
DZ Comedy Show	DZ Comedy Show	Reality television talent show	TBA		TBA	TBA	Upcoming
‘Ā’ilatī	My Family	Magazine	Nassima Djaffar Bey	December 2016 –	Everyday; 5PM (AST)	Everyday; 11AM (AST)	Yes

== Events ==
Notable events to which Echorouk TV hold broadcasting rights include:

=== Football ===
- Belgian First Division A

== Television dramas ==
Algerian television dramas

- B73
- Lala Zineb

Arab television dramas

- The Exit

Turkish television dramas

- Muhteşem Yüzyıl: Kösem (2017–17)
- Ötesiz İnsanlar (2016–17)

== Children's series ==
=== Animated series ===
- Qiṣṣat Āyah (Lebanon)
- Loulou & Boulboul
- Looney Tunes

=== Anime ===
- Emily of New Moon (إيميلي; 2011)
- Iron Kid (أيرون كيد; 2011)

== See also ==
- Echorouk TV
