= Rahma Benaichouche =

Algerian footballer (born 1991)

Personal information
- Date of birth: 22 November 1991 (age 34)
- Place of birth: Touggourt, Algeria
- Position: Forward

Team information
- Current team: Phoenix
- Number: 17

Senior career*
Years	Team	Apps	(Gls)
–2017	ESF Oued Righ Touggourt		
2017–2019	MZ Biskra		
2019–2020	AS Sûreté Nationale		
2020–2023	JF Khroub		
2023–2024	CF Akbou		
2024–	Phoenix	1	(4)

International career^{‡}
2014–	Algeria	19	(5)
- * Club domestic league appearances and goals as of 27 September 2024 ‡ National team caps and goals as of 5 December 2023

Rahma Benaichouche (Arabic: رحمة بن عيشوش; born 22 November 1991) is an Algerian footballer who plays as a forward for Saudi Women's First Division League club Phoenix and the Algeria national team.

== Early life ==
Benaichouche was born in Touggourt in the Algerian Sahara. developed an early interest in football. Growing up in Touggourt, she engaged in casual street games with friends. Supported by her family, she transitioned to professional football by joining the ESF Oued Righ Touggourt, marking the start of her formal involvement in the sport.

== Club career ==
Ben Aichouche began her career with amateur club ESF Oued Righ Touggourt. After she got her first call-up to the national team, Rahima later joined MZ Biskra seeing it as the team where a real breakthrough could happen. The team had a structure, a system, and a working program. After three successful seasons with MZ Biskra, she received an offer from Algiers-based team AS Sûreté Nationale for a one-season time, and she ultimately made the move.

=== JF Khroub ===
On 28 October 2020, Rahima Ben Aichouche announced her departure from AS Sûreté Nationale to join Algerian Women's Elite Championship defending champions JK Khroub.

Benaichouche's first maiden title was with JF Khroub when they lifted the 2022–23 Algerian Women's Cup for the first time in the club's history.

=== CF Akbou ===
On 25 August 2023, CF Akbou announced the signing of Benaichouche to compete in the 2023–24 Algerian Women's Championship.

=== Phoenix ===
On 18 September 2024, Phoenix announced the signing of Benaichouche, making this her first professional contract abroad.

== International career ==
In 2014, Benaichouche got her first call-up to the Algerian national team to face Senegal in double friendly matches, She didn't get called up again till 2018. when she got her second call-up to the Algerian national team to face Senegal in the 2018 Women's Africa Cup of Nations qualification, in the second leg she scored the winning goal that sent Algeria to the second round. Benaichouche played at 2021 Arab Women's Cup.

== Career statistics ==
=== International ===
As of match played 5 December 2023

Appearances and goals by national team and year
National team	Year	Apps	Goals
Algeria	2018	2	1
Algeria	2019	4	0
Algeria	2020	3	0
Algeria	2021	3	3
Algeria	2022	0	0
Algeria	2023	7	1
Total		19	5

Scores and results list Algeria's goal tally first, score column indicates score after each Sarr goal.

List of international goals scored by Rahma Benaichouche
No.	Date	Venue	Opponent	Score	Result	Competition
1	10 April 2018	20 August Stadium, Algiers, Algeria	Senegal	2–0	2–0	2018 Women's Africa Cup of Nations qualification
2	28 August 2021	Police Academy Stadium, Cairo, Egypt	Palestine	1–0	4–1	2021 Arab Women's Cup
3	28 August 2021	Police Academy Stadium, Cairo, Egypt	Palestine	2–1	4–1	2021 Arab Women's Cup
4	28 August 2021	Police Academy Stadium, Cairo, Egypt	Palestine	4–1	4–1	2021 Arab Women's Cup
5	11 April 2023	Nelson Mandela Stadium, Algiers, Algeria	Tanzania	2–0	3–0	Friendly

== Honours ==
JF Khroub

- Algerian Women's Cup: 2022–23

CF Akbou

- Algerian Women's Championship: 2023–24
- Algerian Women's Cup: 2023–24
- Algerian Women's League Cup: 2023–24
