= Roman mausoleum of Akbou =

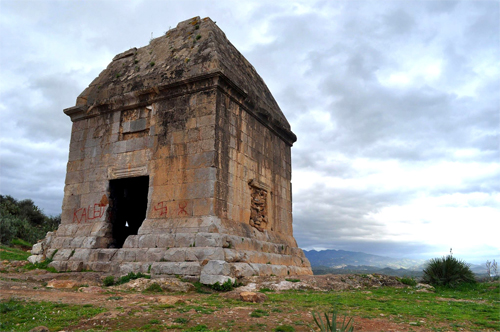
- View from the north.
- Interactive map of Roman mausoleum of Akbou
- Location: Akbou, Algeria
- Type: Mausoleum
- Material: Limestone
- Completion date: 3rd century AD

The ancient mausoleum of Akbou is a funerary monument located at Akbou, in the Béjaïa Province, Algeria. Constructed in the second half of the third century AD or the beginning of the fourth, it may have served as the tomb of a local notable, such as the city's governor. The monument was added to the general list of protected cultural heritage in the supplementary record for Béjaïa province in 2010.

== Location and name ==
The mausoleum was constructed at the extreme southwest edge of the district of Akbou (ancient Ausium), on the Soummam river valley, in Béjaïa, not far from the Mediterranean coast of Kabylia.

The monument was built on a high point, which has given it the alternate name "mausoleum of Piton", but it is not located on the summit of this hill. It was built on an extension on the northwest slope about halfway up, overlooking the river valley.

The name "Akbou" or "Aqbu" is the Berber word for a vaulted building or the layout of the land that supports it (i.e. 'mound). Either way, the mausoleum was sufficiently imposing to give its name to the general location and eventually to the nearby town. No other ancient remains have been detected in the area, but it is possible that a settlement is buried under the alluvium deposited by the Soummam.

== History and archaeology ==
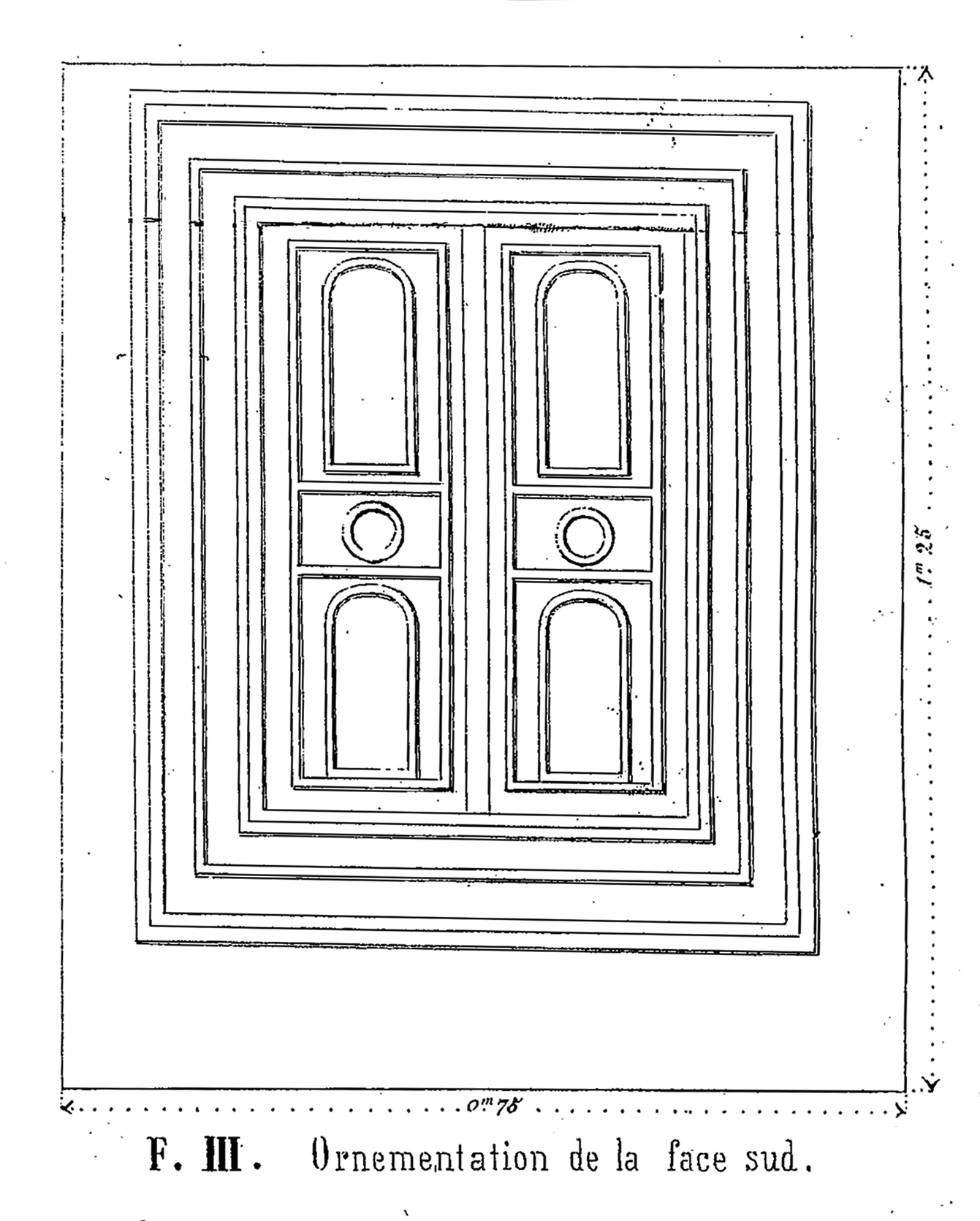
Sketch of a false door by Henri Aucapitaine.

In 1860, the baron Henri Aucapitaine, guest of the bachagha Ben Ali Cherif, was very struck by this monument. In a written account accompanied by sketches and plans, he relates his visit to the mausoleum and estimates that it was constructed around the beginning of the first century AD.

On the basis of architectural criteria and in the absence of any other method of dating it (any inscribed dedication that may have existed is lost), the date of construction is now placed in the second half of the third or beginning of the fourth century AD. No Romans were settled in the region, so the mausoleum probably belonged to a Romanised Numidian family, perhaps one of the governors of Ausium.

The mausoleum is relatively well-preserved as a result of its inaccessible location, although it was used as a local place of prayer until the 1970s and, in the same period, a shelter was attached to the side of the structure. In 2006, this shelter was removed and invasive vegetation was removed from the surrounding area.

In 2010, the mausoleum was inscribed on the general list of protected cultural heritage in the supplementary inventory of Béjaïa province, but two years later its state of conservation and proximity to an active mine was a cause for concern.

== Description ==
The monument is unique in the region and very well preserved, aside from roof, which is lost, and some damage to some of the false doors. Additionally, the ground around about, stripped down to the bedrock, has been excavated several times. It is possible that there was a tomb under the mausoleum, but no trace of this was detectable by the end of the nineteenth century.

=== Exterior ===
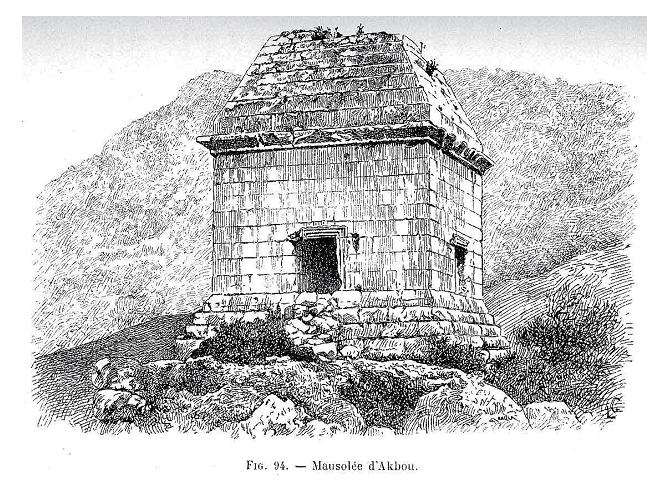
Engraving of the mausoleum

The mausoleum has a square floor plan, measuring 5.50 m on each side and is oriented to the cardinal directions. It contains a single raised chamber on a base of four steps, which each measure 30 cm in height. The chamber measures 4.10 m on each internal side. The roof is a pyramidion made of well-joined ashlar blocks, but the upper half is lost, leaving the modern height of the whole mausoleum at just 13 m.

The structure is made of limestone ashlar blocks from the local area, joined by double dovetail joints. The cornice is made of a row of ashlar blocks which are remarkably well sculpted and decorated with mouldings.

There is a door on the north side of the mausoleum, which was originally sealed by a stone block that is now lost. Above this door was a marble plaque (also lost) which would have borne an inscription naming the occupant of the mausoleum. Each of the other three sides is decorated with a white marble false door, framed by a ribbed chambranle and bearing swastikas surrounded by circles.

=== Interior ===
The internal arrangement of the mausoleum is unusual. A system of columns and arches was constructed independently of the walls and without any physical connection to them. The walls are covered in a plaster coating which extends even behind the columns, showing that it was applied before they were built.

The three walls without a door in them are decorated on the inside with a double arch, supported by three ionic columns (only one capital is preserved). This arrangement, in which the central column partially blocks the corresponding false door, shows that they were never intended to act as access ways. The vaults are further supported, particularly on the west and east sides, by bases whose feet do not make contact with the interior walls.

Vertically, the mausoleum is divided into two parts. The upper chamber's floor is level with the entrance and its ceiling is the vaulted roof of the chamber. The lower chamber occupies the lower part of the structure, corresponding to the podium and steps on the outside. A stone floor, which was broken at an unknown date, separated the two chambers. The lower chamber, which was a kind of crypt, would have contained the sarcophagi.

== See also ==
- Royal mausoleum of Mauretania
- Madghacen

== Bibliography ==
- Aucapitaine, Henri (1860). "Mausolée d'Akbou". Revue africaine: 418–421.
- Daly, Marcel (1884). "Première excursion en Algérie". Revue générale de l'architecture et des travaux publics. 41: 193–197.
- Laporte, Jean-Pierre (2020). "Recherches sur l'architecture funéraire de la Kabylie et du Titteri (Algérie)". Bulletin d'archéologie algérienne. VIII: 157–219.
