= 2025–26 Algerian Women's Championship D2 =

National Championship D2
- Season: 2025–26
- Dates: 25 October 2025–17 April 2026
- Champions: JS Saoura (Gr. East); MC Alger (Gr. Center); MC Oran (Gr. West)
- All statistics correct as of 24 October 2025.

The 2025–26 National Championship Division 2 is the 15th season of the Algerian Women's Championship D2, the Algerian national women's association football competition. The championship is reparted into three groups, East, Center and West. The winners of each group will promoted to the Elite Division (D1).

== Clubs, stadiums and locations ==
There was no group from south this season, teams are split in the three groups: center, east and west. UMA Djelfa from center, EFJB Ouargla from east, CSA Oran-Centre and APDSF Tiaret from west made a general withrawal this season.
JS Saoura from group west moved to group east replacing EFJB Ouargla, and CSA Oran-Centre was replaced by MC Oran in the group west.

=== Group 1 - east ===
Team	Home city	Stadium	Capacity
CM Batna	Batna	Abdellatif Chaoui Stadium (Hamla 3)	10,000
CSA Al Amel Bordj Bou Arreridj	Bordj Bou Arréridj	20 August 1955 Stadium	15,000
MF Bouchegouf	Bouchegouf	Boudjemaa Souidani Stadium (Guelma)	15,000
MB Rouissat	Rouissat	18 February Stadium	18,000
JS Saoura	Béchar	5.000 Places Stadium (Tamacine)	5,000
ES Sétif	Sétif	8 May 1945 Stadium	25,000
AR Tébessa SF	Tébessa	Lazhar Benhamza Stadium	18,000
CRA Témacine	Tamacine	5.000 Places Stadium	5,000
EFJB Ouargla (withrew)	Ouargla	24 February Stadium	10,000

=== Group 2 - centre ===
Team	Home city	Stadium	Capacity
Olympique Akbou	Akbou	1 November 1954 Stadium	2,000
FC Casbah	Birtouta, Algiers	Rachid Messadia Stadium	4,000
MC Alger	Baraki, Algiers	Aït El Hocine Stadium	3,000
Paradou AC	Hydra, Algiers	Belkheirani Brothers Stadium (Benkhelil)	1,000
USM Alger	Bologhine, Algiers	Omar Hamadi Stadium	10,000
NE Bouira	Bouira	Saïd Bourouba Stadium	5,000
CFN Boumerdès	Boumerdès	Boumerdès Communal Stadium	1,000
US Ouled Fayet	Ouled Fayet	Ahmed Demad Stadium	7,000
AES Souk El Tenine	Souk El-Thenine	Souk El Thenine Communal Stadium	3,000
ASD Tizi Ouzou	Tizi Ouzou	1 November 1954 Stadium	21,240
UMA Djelfa (withrew)	Djelfa	Aïn El Ibel Communal Stadium (Aïn El Ibel)	5,000

=== Group 3 - west ===
Team	Home city	Stadium	Capacity
ECAFF Adrar	Adrar	18 February Stadium	15,000
MC El Bayadh	El Bayadh	Zakaria Medjdoub Stadium	15,000
CSB Oran	El Kerma, Oran	Mohamed Khassani Stadium	5,000
AS Intissar Oran	Oran	Kaddour Keloua Stadium	4,000
CSA Jawharat Canastel	Oran	Kaddour Keloua Stadium	4,000
MC Oran	Oran	Ahmed Zabana Stadium	40,000
FC Bel Abbès	Sidi Bel Abbès	24 February Stadium	45,000
CF Ténès	Ténès	Gheddab Sahnoune Stadium (Chlef)	1,000
DS Tiaret	Tiaret	Ahmed Kaïd Stadium	30,000
CSA Oran Center (withrew)	Oran	Kaddour Keloua Stadium	4,000
APDSF Tiaret (withrew)	Tiaret	Ahmed Kaïd Stadium	30,000

=== Locations ===
Locations of the 2025–26 Algerian Women's Championship D2 teams
West
Center
East
Algiers Province clubs
Oran Province clubs

== Regular season ==
=== Group 1 (East) ===
==== Standings ====
Pos	Team	Pld	W	D	L	GF	GA	GD	Pts	Qualification or relegation
1	JS Saoura	14	14	0	0	129	3	+126	42	Promotion to 2026–27 Elite Championship
2	ES Sétif	14	10	1	3	33	16	+17	31	
3	CM Batna	14	5	3	6	25	43	−18	18	
4	AR Tébessa SF	14	7	2	5	21	21	0	17 (Note: AR Tébessa SF were deducted 6 points.)	
5	MF Bouchegouf	14	6	3	5	13	27	−14	15 (Note: MF Bouchegouf were deducted 6 points.)	
6	MB Rouissat	14	5	2	7	17	36	−19	13 (Note: MB Rouissat were deducted 4 points.)	
7	CRA Témacine	13	1	0	12	4	48	−44	−2 (Note: CRA Témacine were deducted 5 points.)	
8	CSA Al Amel Bordj Bou Arreridj	13	1	1	11	6	54	−48	−5 (Note: CSA Al Amel Bordj Bou Arreridj were deducted 9 points.)	

Updated to match(es) played on 17 April 2026. Source: lnff.dz
Rules for classification: 1) Points; 2) Results between teams 3) Goal difference; 4) Number of goals scored

==== Results ====
Home \ Away	JSS	ESS	CMB	ART	MFB	MBR	CRAT	CBBA
JS Saoura		4–0	15–1	3–0	8–0	11–0	16–0	8–0
ES Sétif	1–8		4–0	1–0	0–1	2–0	6–0	3–0
CM Batna	1–9	0–2		2–3	3–0	2–1	3–0	3–0
AR Tébessa SF	0–11	1–1	2–0		1–1	3–0	3–0	3–0
MF Bouchegouf	0–6	0–3	2–2	1–0		1–0	3–0	2–0
MB Rouissat	0–9	1–3	3–3	1–0	1–1		3–0	3–0
CRA Témacine	0–3	1–4	0–3	0–2	0–1	0–1		3–0
CSA Al Amel Bordj Bou Arreridj	0–19	0–3	2–2	0–3	3–0	1–4	–	

Updated to match(es) played on 17 April 2026. Source: lnff.dz
Legend: Blue = home team win; Yellow = draw; Red = away team win.

=== Group 2 (Center) ===
==== Standings ====
Pos	Team	Pld	W	D	L	GF	GA	GD	Pts	Qualification or relegation
1	MC Alger	18	17	0	1	69	9	+60	51	Promotion to 2026–27 Elite Championship
2	USM Alger	18	15	2	1	79	9	+70	47	Promotion to 2026–27 Elite Championship
3	ASD Tizi Ouzou	18	11	3	4	50	19	+31	35 (Note: ASD Tizi Ouzou were deducted 1 point.)	
4	Paradou AC	18	10	4	4	55	13	+42	34	
5	NE Bouira	18	7	3	8	31	33	−2	24	
6	Olympique Akbou	18	7	2	9	32	27	+5	20 (Note: Olympique Akbou were deducted 3 points.)	
7	CFN Boumerdès	18	7	4	7	30	27	+3	16 (Note: CFN Boumerdès were deducted 9 points.)	
8	FC Casbah	18	5	0	13	14	36	−22	14 (Note: FC Casbah were deducted 1 point.)	
9	AES Souk El Tenine	18	2	0	16	7	94	−87	5 (Note: AES Souk El Tenine were deducted 1 point.)	
10	US Ouled Fayet	18	0	0	18	1	101	−100	−4 (Note: US Ouled Fayet were deducted 4 points.)	

Updated to match(es) played on 17 April 2026. Source: lnff.dz
Rules for classification: 1) Points; 2) Results between teams 3) Goal difference; 4) Number of goals scored

==== Results ====
Home \ Away	MCA	USMA	ASDT	PAC	NEB	OA	CFNB	FCC	AESS	USOF
MC Alger		2–1	2–1	1–0	5–0	4–1	3–0	4–0	8–0	10–0
USM Alger	2–1		1–0	3–2	4–0	2–1	3–0	2–0	11–0	11–0
ASD Tizi Ouzou	1–2	0–6		2–1	2–1	5–0	3–1	2–0	8–0	3–0
Paradou AC	2–3	1–1	0–0		1–1	1–0	1–1	5–0	10–0	11–0
NE Bouira	1–4	0–1	0–4	3–0		1–1	2–2	3–0	3–0	3–0
Olympique Akbou	0–1	1–2	2–2	0–3	3–2		0–1	0–3	8–0	4–0
CFN Boumerdès	0–3	1–1	3–3	1–3	0–3	0–2		1–0	6–0	3–0
FC Casbah	0–2	0–4	0–3	0–1	2–3	0–2	0–3		2–0	3–0
AES Souk El Tenine	0–5	0–7	0–8	0–4	1–5	0–1	0–5	1–2		2–1
US Ouled Fayet	0–9	0–17	0–3	0–6	0–3	0–6	0–2	0–2	0–3	

Updated to match(es) played on 17 April 2026. Source: lnff.dz
Legend: Blue = home team win; Yellow = draw; Red = away team win.

=== Group 3 (West) ===
==== Standings ====
Pos	Team	Pld	W	D	L	GF	GA	GD	Pts	Qualification or relegation
1	MC Oran	16	15	1	0	72	2	+70	46	Promotion to 2026–27 Elite Championship
2	MC El Bayadh	16	14	1	1	56	11	+45	43	
3	CSA Jawharat Canastel	16	9	1	6	37	25	+12	25 (Note: CSA Jawharat Canastel were deducted 3 points.)	
4	FC Bel Abbès	16	7	1	8	20	37	−17	18 (Note: FC Bel Abbès were deducted 4 pointS.)	
5	DS Tiaret	15	5	2	8	26	34	−8	17	
6	AS Intissar Oran	16	4	1	11	23	33	−10	9 (Note: AS Intissar Oran were deducted 4 pointS.)	
7	CF Ténès	15	3	2	10	10	30	−20	7 (Note: CF Ténès were deducted 4 points.)	
8	ECAFF Adrar	16	4	0	12	14	58	−44	5 (Note: ECAFF Adrar were deducted 7 points.)	
9	CSB Oran	16	2	3	11	13	44	−31	2 (Note: CSB Oran were deducted 7 points.)	

Updated to match(es) played on 17 April 2026. Source: lnff.dz
Rules for classification: 1) Points; 2) Results between teams 3) Goal difference; 4) Number of goals scored

==== Results ====
Home \ Away	MCO	MCEB	CSJC	FCBA	DST	ASIO	CFT	ECAF	CSBO
MC Oran		5–0	3–0	8–0	2–0	3–0	3–0	10–0	3–0
MC El Bayadh	1–1		3–2	6–0	3–0	3–0	2–0	3–0	4–0
CSA Jawharat Canastel	0–5	1–3		3–0	2–1	3–0	2–2	6–1	4–0
FC Bel Abbès	1–4	0–3	2–0		1–3	2–0	1–0	3–0	1–4
DS Tiaret	0–6	1–8	2–4	2–2		0–1	1–1	3–0	2–2
AS Intissar Oran	0–3	1–3	0–3	1–3	3–0		0–1	9–0	2–2
CF Ténès	0–7	0–5	0–1	0–1	–	1–6		2–1	3–0
ECAFF Adrar	0–6	0–6	3–0	3–0	0–4	3–0	3–0		3–0
CSB Oran	0–3	0–3	0–6	0–3	0–3	0–3	1–1	4–0	

Updated to match(es) played on 17 April 2026. Source: lnff.dz
Legend: Blue = home team win; Yellow = draw; Red = away team win.

== See also ==
- 2025–26 Algerian Women's Championship
- 2025–26 Algerian Women's Cup
