= Algerian Futsal Championship =

- Logo of the LNFS
- Founded: 2017
- Country: Algeria
- Confederation: CAF
- Level on pyramid: 1
- Relegation to: Championship D2
- Domestic cup: Algerian Cup
- Current champions: AC Auzium (2025)
- Most championships: MC Béjaïa; Paradou AC (2 titles each)
- Website: Official website
- Current: 2025–26

Algerian Futsal Championship (Arabic: بطولة الجزائر لكرة الصالة) is the premier futsal league in Algeria. The competition is run by the National Futsal League under the auspices of the Algerian Football Federation.

== History ==
The first Algerian Futsal Championship started in 2017. The Ligue Nationale de Futsal which started to run the championship was created on 15 February 2017 with Djamel Zemmam first president of the Ligue.

In 2021, The Ligue changed the name to Département de Futsal (Futsal Department) with Hakim Medane president.

In 2022, the name of the departement return to its original name, the Ligue Nationale de Futsal.

== List of champions ==
Season	Champions	Runners-up	Third-place
2017–18	MC Béjaïa	AS Rabie El Djazaïri	
2018–19	MC Béjaïa	EF Constantine	
2019–20	CF Bordj Bou Arréridj	AS Rabie El Djazaïri	
2020–21	Not held due to the COVID-19 pandemic in Algeria		
2021–22	AS Rabie El Djazaïri	CF Bordj Bou Arréridj	Wifak Rouisset
2022–23	Paradou AC	AS Rabie El Djazaïri	HB Metlili Chaamba
2022–23	Paradou AC	AS Rabie El Djazaïri	...
2023–24	Paradou AC	AC Auzium	CS Ghardaia
2023–24	Paradou AC	AC Auzium	CS Nasr Bounoura
2024–25	AC Auzium	CS Nasr Bounoura	CF El Kseur
2024–25	AC Auzium	CS Nasr Bounoura	CM Hassi Messaoud
2025–26			

== Performance by club ==
Rank	Team	Winners	Runners-up	Years won	Years runners-up
1	MC Béjaïa	2	0	2018, 2019	–
1	Paradou AC	2	0	2023, 2024	–
3	AS Rabie El Djazaïri (Oran)	1	3	2022	2018, 2020, 2023
4	CF Bordj Bou Arréridj	1	1	2020	2022
4	AC Auzium (Akbou)	1	1	2025	2024
6	EF Constantine	0	1	–	2019
6	CS Nasr Bounoura (Ghardaïa)	0	1	–	2025

== See also ==
- Algerian Futsal Cup
