= 2026–27 Algerian Women's Cup =

Tournament details
- Country: Algeria
- Dates: 6 November 2026 – TBD
- Teams: 40
- All statistics correct as of 25 October 2026. Goals scored in penalty shoot-outs not included.

the 2026–27 Algerian Women's Cup is the 26th season of the annual Algerian women's association football cup competition. Fourteen teams will participate in the competition. JS Kabylie are the defending champions for the second time consecutively, having beaten Afak Relizane 1–0 in the 2026 final.

== Teams ==
The draw for the first and second preliminary rounds will take place on Thursday, October 29, 2026.

Match schedule and competition format:

- First preliminary round: To be played on 6 and 7 November 2026 (involving second-division clubs).
- Second preliminary round: To be played on 11 and 12 December 2026 (featuring the entry of first-division clubs).

Round	Clubs remaining	Clubs involved	Winners from previous round	New entries this round	Leagues entering at this round
National rounds
Preleminary round 1	20	–	–	–	Women's League 2
Preleminary round 2	22	22	12	10	Women's League 1
Round of 16	16	16	11	5	Women's League 1
Quarter-finals	8	8	8	none	none
Semi-finals	4	4	4	none	none
Final	2	2	2	none	none

== Knockout stage ==
=== Preleminary round 1 ===
20 teams take part to the preliminary round from the second division.

6 November 2026 1	Al Amel Bordj Bou Arreridj	2–7	ALS Batna	Setif
10:00				Stadium: 8 May 1945 Stadium

6 November 2026 2	MAB Oran	Canceled	CM Batna	Ben Aknoun, Algiers
10:00				Stadium: El Mokrani Stadium

6 November 2026 3	ECAFF Adrar	0–3 (withrew)	AR Tébessa SF	Ain Oussera
10:00				Stadium: 1 November 1954 Stadium

6 November 2026 4	ASO Chlef	2–1	NE Bouira	Berrouaghia
10:00				Stadium: Fergani Guernina Stadium

6 November 2026 5	CFN Boumerdès	2–3	Olympique M'chedallah	Tizi Ouzou
14:30				Stadium: 1 November 1954 Stadium

7 November 2026 6	AS Evasion Béjaïa	0–3	ES Sétif	Kherrata
10:00				Stadium: Kherrata Communal Stadium

6 November 2026 7	MC Ain El Arbaa	0–9	ASD Tizi Ouzou	Ain Defla
10:00				Stadium: Abdelkader Khellal Stadium

6 November 2026 8	USM Khenchela	1–2	ES Ben Aknoun	Ras El Oued
10:00				Stadium: Tahar Guidoum Stadium

6 November 2026 9	APDSF Tiaret	5–0	FC Bel Abbès	Mascara
10:00				Stadium: Aoued Meflah Stadium

6 November 2026 10	MB Rouissat	0–8	Olympique Akbou	Bou Saâda
10:00				Stadium: Mokhtar Abdellatif Stadium

== See also ==
- 2026–27 Algerian Women's Championship
- 2026–27 Algerian Women's Championship D2
