= CF Akbou =

Algerian women's football club

CF Akbou ⵛⵍⵓⴱ ⴼⵓⵜⴱⴰⵍ ⴰⵇⵠⵓ
- Full name: Club Football Akbou ⵛⵍⵓⴱ ⴼⵓⵜⴱⴰⵍ ⴰⵇⵠⵓ
- Nickname: Les Gazelles (in French)
- Founded: 8 March 2010 (16 years ago)
- Ground: 1 November 1954 Stadium (Akbou)
- Capacity: 2,000
- President: Omar Merabet
- Head Coach: Nadir Maadsi
- League: Algerian Women's Championship
- 2025–26: Elite National Championship, 1st of 14 (champions)
- Website: https://www.cfakbou.dz/
Home colours	Away colours

Club Football Akbou (Arabic: نادي أقبو لكرة القدم; Tamazight: ⵛⵍⵓⴱ ⴼⵓⵜⴱⴰⵍ ⴰⵇⵠⵓ), commonly referred to as CF Akbou is an Algerian women's professional football club based in Akbou, Béjaïa Province, Kabylia that currently plays in the Algerian Women's Championship, the top division in the Algerian female football league system.

In March 2023, The club was recognized by FIFA for its social and humanitarian action.

== History ==
CF Akbou was founded on 8 March 2010 as a way of supporting women's causes. In an interview with FIFA, the president and founder, Omar Merabet, stated, "Initially, our aim wasn't to be among the top clubs in Algeria. We simply wanted to provide young girls in the city, starting from the age of six, an equal opportunity to engage in sports, just like boys. For instance, we have never imposed membership fees. The club ensures that all players, from the U-6 category to the senior team, have access to necessary equipment.

In 2013, after playing three seasons, the club was promoted to the Super Division Féminine. Two years later, the club reached the semi-finals of the Algerian Women's Cup for the first time in two consecutive years, namely 2016 and 2017.

In the 2022–23 season, CF Akbou won the honorary title for the first half of the national women's football championship after finishing top of the league by the ninth round.

In 2024, CF Akbou achieved a historic national quadruple, winning for the first time in its history the Algerian Women's Championship, the Algerian Women's Cup, the Algerian Women's League Cup and the Algerian Women's Super Cup. It is the first of this kind for the Algerian women's football.

For the 2024–25 season, CF Akbou retains its title of champion of Algeria.

For the 2025–26 season, CF Akbou won the Algerian championship title for the third consecutive time.

== Players ==
=== Current squad ===
As of 26 January 2024

Note: Flags indicate national team as defined under FIFA eligibility rules; some limited exceptions apply. Players may hold more than one non-FIFA nationality.

No.	Pos.	Nation	Player
—	DF	ALG	Wassila Alouache
—	FW	ALG	Thiziri Baâli
—	FW	ALG	Rahma Benaichouche
—	GK	ALG	Aya Slim
—	FW	ALG	Ghania Ayadi
—	MF	ALG	Melissa Baâziz
—	GK	ALG	Chaima Aourtilane
—	MF	ALG	Lina Tamguelt
—	DF	ALG	Nadira Regouli
—	DF	ALG	Fatiha Wadah

No.	Pos.	Nation	Player
—	MF	ALG	Fatiha Ghorfati
—	MF	MAR	Kaabi Dàkhal
—	FW	ALG	Nadia Iouanoughene
—	GK	IRQ	Yousra Bicshe
—	MF	ALG	Djamila Benaissa
—	MF	ALG	Hanane Benemara
—	DF	ALG	Lila Benboudjemaâ
—	FW	ALG	Liza Baali
—	DF	ALG	Lilia Hamitouche

== Honours ==
=== Domestic ===
- Algerian Women's Championship

Winners (3): 2023–24, 2024–25, 2025–26

- Algerian Women's Cup

Winners (1): 2023–24
Runners-up (1): 2024–25

- Algerian Women's League Cup

Winners (1): 2023–24

- Algerian Women's Super Cup

Winners (2): 2024, 2026
Runners-up (1): 2025

== Performance in CAF competitions ==
- CAF Women's Champions League: 2 appearances

2024 – UNAF qualifiers round
2026 – UNAF qualifiers round
