= Open Your Heart (talk show) =

- Promotional poster for Open Your Heart
- Also known as: Iftah 9albek; Iftah Qalbek; Iftah Kalbek
- Genre: Reality television; Talk show
- Created by: Pascal Bataille; Laurent Fontaine
- Based on: Y'a que la vérité qui compte
- Directed by: Yassine Naoui
- Presented by: Salima Souakri
- Country of origin: Algeria
- Original language: Arabic
- No. of seasons: 2

Production
- Camera setup: Multiple
- Production companies: Not Found Prod (by Wellcom Advertising)

Original release
- Network: Echorouk TV
- Release: November 24, 2016

Related
- …And allthing is possible!; Jek El Mersoul

Open Your Heart (Arabic: افتح قلبك, ’Iftaḥ Qalbak) is an Algerian psychosocial reality television talk show hosted by Salima Souakri. The show debuted on November 24, 2016 on Echorouk TV, and airs Thursdays at 9p.m. (AST). It is the local adaptation of the French series Y'a que la vérité qui compte.

== Concept ==
A person asks the production to invite another person on the set to "make an important statement".

The guest has no idea of the reason for his invitation, nor of the person who wishes to speak to him, before entering the set.

At that moment, the two persons (the inviter and the guest) are separated by a "curtain" and can only see themselves through two television screens. This allows the guest to know the person who wanted to meet him.

A discussion then starts between the two persons. The inviter exposes what he has to say, and this may concern a declaration of love, reunion of childhood friends, etc., and the guest answers to him.

The guest, a few minutes later, decides whether or not he wants to meet in real life the person who invited him. If he refuses, the two people return without meeting; if he accepts, the curtain opens.

== Episodes ==
Season	Episodes	Season premiere	Season finale
1	23	November 24, 2016	May 4, 2017
2	TBA	December 28, 2017	TBA

== See also ==
- Television in Algeria
