= Zelfana District =

Zelfana
- District
- Map of Algeria highlighting Ghardaïa Province
- Coordinates: 32°24′N 4°14′E
- Country: Algeria
- Province: Ghardaïa Province
- Capital: Zelfana
- Time zone: UTC+1 (CET)

Zelfana is a district of Ghardaïa Province, Algeria. It was named after its capital, Zelfana.

== Municipalities ==
The district contains only one municipality:

- Zelfana
