= Algerian Women's Super Cup =

Algerian Women's Super Cup كأس الجزائر الممتازة للسيدات
- Founded: 2016
- Region: Algeria
- Current champions: JS Kabylie (1st title)
- Most championships: CF Akbou (2 titles)
- Website: lnff.dz
- 2026 W-Super Cup

The Algerian Women's Super Cup (Arabic: كأس الجزائر الممتازة للسيدات) is a women's association football competition in Algeria. pitting regional teams against each other. It was established in 2016. It is the women's equivalent of the Algerian Super Cup for men. The winner of the 2016 edition was FC Constantine.

== Finals ==
Year	Winners	Score	Runners-up	Venue
2016	FC Constantine	0–0 (3–1 p)	Afak Relizane	Stade Omar Hamadi, Algiers
2024	CF Akbou	1–0	JF Khroub	8 May 1945 Stadium, Sétif
2025	JS Kabylie	1–0	CF Akbou	Mustapha Tchaker Stadium, Blida
2026	CF Akbou	4–0	JS Kabylie	Martyrs Stadium, Akbou

== Most successful clubs ==
Club	Winners	Runners-up	Winning Cups	Runners-up
CF Akbou	2	1	2024, 2026	2025
JS Kabylie	1	1	2025	2026
CS Constantine	1	0	2016	
Afak Relizane	0	1		2016
JF Khroub	0	1		2024

- CS Constantine (ex. FC Constantine)

== See also ==
- Algerian Women's Championship
- Algerian Women's League Cup
- Algerian Women's Cup
