= Algerian Futsal Cup =

Algerian Futsal Cup كأس الجزائر لكرة الصالة
- Founded: 2004
- Region: Algeria
- Current champions: Mustakbal Hai Sabah (2026)
- Most championships: Rabie El Djazaïri Oran; MC Béjaïa; AC Auzium (2 titles each)
- 2025–26

The Algerian Futsal Cup (Arabic: كأس الجزائر لكرة الصالة) is a futsal competition in Algeria, pitting regional teams against each other. It was established in 2004. The first wa won by OM Ruisseau and the second edition of 2011-12 was won by GC Mascara.

== Finals ==
Year	Winners	Score	Runners-up	Venue	Attendance
2004–05	OM Ruisseau	8–4	ASO Chlef	Salle Omnisports, Boufarik	3.000
2011–12	GC Mascara	3–2	IRS Garidi-Kouba	Palais des Sports, Oran	5.000
2012–13	AS Sûreté de Skikda	4–3	AS Rabie El Djazaïri	Salle omnisports de Skikda, Skikda	
2013–14	AS Rabie El Djazaïri	5–2	AS Sûreté de Skikda	Palais des Sports, Oran	5,000
2014–15	AS Rabie El Djazaïri	3–2	CF Akbou	Salle omnisports de Relizane, Relizane	
2015–16	CSA Futsal Bordj Bou Arréridj	6–2	MC Béjaïa	Salle omnisports de Sidi Bel Abbès, Sidi Bel Abbès	
2016–17	MC Béjaïa	6–1	AS Guelma	Salle omnisports Rabah Bitat, Bouira	
2017–18	MC Béjaïa	7–5	EF Constantine	Hacène Harcha Arena, Algiers	
2018–19	EF Constantine	12–5	MC Béjaïa	Hacène Harcha Arena, Algiers	50
2019–20	Not held due to the COVID-19 pandemic in Algeria				
2020–21	Not held due to the COVID-19 pandemic in Algeria				
2021–22	Canceled				
2022–23	AC Auzium	6–5	Paradou AC	Hacène Harcha Arena, Algiers	
2023–24	CF El Kseur	1–1 (a.e.t.) (5–3 p)	AC Auzium	La Coupole, Algiers	
2024–25	AC Auzium	1–1 (a.e.t.) (8–7 p)	CS Bir Mourad Rais	La Coupole, Algiers	
2025–26	Mustakbal Hai Sabah	5–2	JSM Djamaa	La Coupole, Algiers	1,000

== Performance by club ==
Rank	Club	Winners	Runners-up	Winning years	Runners-up years
1	MC Béjaïa	2	2	2017, 2018	2016, 2019
2	AS Rabie El Djazaïri (Oran)	2	1	2014, 2015	2013
2	AC Auzium (Akbou)	2	1	2023, 2025	2024
4	AS Sûreté de Skikda	1	1	2013	2014
4	EF Constantine	1	1	2019	2018
6	OM Ruisseau	1	0	2005	
6	GC Mascara	1	0	2012	
6	CF Bordj Bou Arréridj	1	0	2016	
6	CF El Kseur	1	0	2024	
6	Mustakbal Hai Sabah (Oran)	1	0	2026	
10	ASO Chlef	0	1		2005
10	IRS Garidi-Kouba	0	1		2012
10	CF Akbou	0	1		2015
10	AS Guelma	0	1		2017
10	Paradou AC	0	1		2023
10	CS Bir Mourad Raïs	0	1		2025

== See also ==
- Algerian Futsal Championship
