= Chorfa, Bouïra =

Chorfa
- Location within Algeria
- Coordinates: 36°21′42″N 4°19′51″E
- Country: Algeria
- Province: Bouïra

Population (2008)
  - Total: 16,173
- Time zone: UTC+1 (West Africa Time)

Chorfa is a town and commune in Bouïra Province, Algeria.
