= Zelfana =

Zelfana زلفانة
- Commune and town
- Location of Zelfana commune within Ghardaïa Province

- Location of Zelfana within Algeria
- Coordinates: 32°23′49″N 4°13′34″E
- Country: Algeria
- Province: Ghardaïa Province
- District: Zelfana District (coextensive)
- Elevation: 358 m (1,175 ft)

Population (2008)
  - Total: 10,161
- Time zone: UTC+1 (CET)

Zelfana (Arabic: زلفانة) is a town and commune, coextensive with Zelfana District, in Ghardaïa Province, Algeria. According to the 2008 census it has a population of 10,161, up from 7,241 in 1998, with an annual growth rate of 3.5%.

== Climate ==
Zelfana has a hot desert climate (Köppen climate classification BWh), with very hot summers and mild winters, and very little precipitation throughout the year.

Climate data for Zelfana
Month	Jan	Feb	Mar	Apr	May	Jun	Jul	Aug	Sep	Oct	Nov	Dec	Year
Mean daily maximum °C (°F)	16.7 (62.1)	19.5 (67.1)	22.8 (73.0)	28.5 (83.3)	32.8 (91.0)	38.5 (101.3)	42.7 (108.9)	41.6 (106.9)	35.5 (95.9)	28.4 (83.1)	21.2 (70.2)	17.4 (63.3)	28.8 (83.8)
Daily mean °C (°F)	10.4 (50.7)	12.8 (55.0)	15.8 (60.4)	20.7 (69.3)	24.8 (76.6)	30.3 (86.5)	33.8 (92.8)	33.0 (91.4)	28.3 (82.9)	21.5 (70.7)	15.0 (59.0)	11.2 (52.2)	21.5 (70.6)
Mean daily minimum °C (°F)	4.2 (39.6)	6.2 (43.2)	8.9 (48.0)	12.9 (55.2)	16.9 (62.4)	22.1 (71.8)	25.0 (77.0)	24.5 (76.1)	21.2 (70.2)	14.7 (58.5)	8.9 (48.0)	5.1 (41.2)	14.2 (57.6)
Average precipitation mm (inches)	7 (0.3)	4 (0.2)	9 (0.4)	5 (0.2)	3 (0.1)	2 (0.1)	1 (0.0)	1 (0.0)	4 (0.2)	6 (0.2)	8 (0.3)	7 (0.3)	57 (2.3)
Source: climate-data.org

== Transportation ==
Zelfana is connected by a short 5 kilometres (3.1 mi) road to the N48 highway, which connects it to Ouargla to the east, and the Trans-Sahara Highway or N1 to the west, near Noumerat Airport. The N1 connects to Ghardaïa to the north and to El Goléa and In Salah to the south.

== Education ==
5.5% of the population has a tertiary education, and another 15.4% has completed secondary education. The overall literacy rate is 78.8%, and is 85.6% among males and 71.9% among females.

== Localities ==
The commune of Zelfana is composed of five localities:

- Centre de Zelfana
- Village socialiste agricole et Centre Pétrolier de Oued Noumer
- El Hesseï
- Gouifla
- La Palmeraie
