= MasterChef (Algerian TV series) =

Algerian television reality show

- Promotional poster for MasterChef Algeria.
- Also known as: French: MasterChef Algérie; Arabic: ماستر شاف الجزائر (Māster Shāf al-Jazā’ir)
- Slogan: And if you become the best amateur cook of Algeria?
- Genre: Reality show; Cooking
- Created by: Franc Roddam
- Based on: MasterChef Australia
- Directed by: Redouane zaaboui
- Creative directors: Marie-Claire Gola; Sophie Dussolier
- Presented by: Tayeb Kaci Abdellah
- Judges: Rabah Ourrad; Yasmina Sellam; Malak Labidi
- Country of origin: Algeria
- Original language: Arabic
- No. of seasons: 3

Production
- Executive producer: Brahim Boucherit
- Producers: Toufik Lerari; Lakhdar Merhoune
- Production locations: Algiers, Algeria
- Camera setup: Multiple
- Running time: 90 minutes (primes); 13 minutes (dailies)
- Production companies: Allégorie Production; Endemol Shine Middle East

Original release
- Network: Echorouk TV; CBC Benna
- Release: 5 November 2016 – present

Related
- Kūnek Shāf; Shkūn Huwwa ash-Shāf ? Ḥebbīt Nwellī Shāf Beyyen Shṭārtek

MasterChef Algeria (Arabic: ماستر شاف الجزائر) is an Algerian culinary reality show, which is broadcast since 5 November 2016 on Echorouk TV.

== Contestants ==
=== 1st season (2016) ===
==== Top 15 ====
Contestants	Age	Occupations	Country	Status
Carmen Hadraoui	62	Retiree	Oran	Winner
Mehdi Matalher	33	Electricist	Alger	Runner-Up
Leila Shamadi	41	Teacher	Sétif	Finalist
Belinda Uhia	24	Student	Tizi Ouzou	12th Eliminated
Mohamed Zahoupelie	26	Employee	Constantine	11th Eliminated
Sofiane Heisou	35	Carpet salesman	Djelfa	10th Eliminated
Khadjia Bata-Haoui	24	Model	Oran	9th Eliminated
Abigail Hamadi-Leight	40	Teacher	Sétif	8th Eliminated
Riyad Taher	43	Merchant	Constantine	7th Eliminated
Constantine Hamtarni	27	Student	Alger	6th Eliminated
Tali Alas-Tabri	35	Housewife	Oran	5th Eliminated
Arbit Hayna	22	Student	Blida	4th Eliminated
Francesca Omahaui	19	Student	Alger	3rd Eliminated
Mohamed Teourbi	26	Merchant	Alger	2nd Eliminated
Ryad Hayati	33	Doctor	Blida	1st Eliminated

== See also ==
- Junior MasterChef
- MasterChef: The Professionals
