= Ras El Aioun =

Coordinates: 35°40′30″N 5°39′12″E

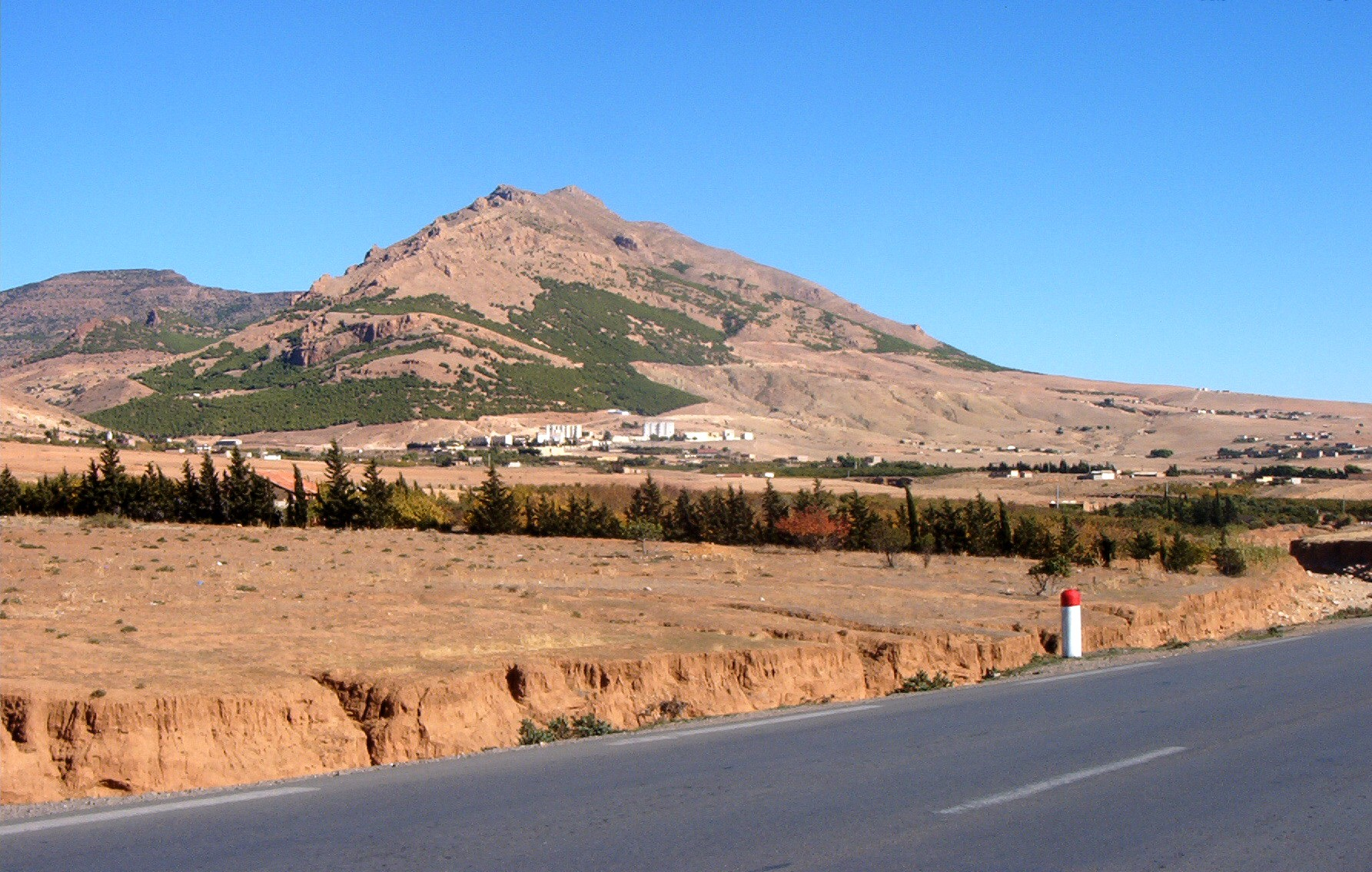

- Country: Algeria
- Province: Batna
- District: Ras El Aioun

Ras El Aioun (Arabic:رأس العيون, Algerian Arabic pronunciation: راس لعيون Ras Layoun, French: Ras El Aïoun) is a town in northeastern Algeria, within the Ras El Aioun District.
