= Ligue Nationale du Football Féminin (Algeria) =

Algerian national women's association football organization

- Abbreviation: LNFF
- Formation: 25 June 2013; 13 years ago
- Type: Sports association
- Region served: Algeria
- Members: 32 football clubs
- President: Djamel Kashi
- Main organ: General Assembly

The Ligue Nationale du Football Féminin (English: National League of Women's Football, Arabic: الرابطة الوطنية لكرة القدم النسوية) abbreviated to LNFF, is the sports league responsible for administering the three women's football divisions in Algeria, the Elite, D1 and D2 National Championship.

== History ==
The women's league was established on 25 June 2013 under the name of the Ligue du Football Féminin (LFF). The first president was Djamel Kashi.

== Crest ==
Old logo

Former logo

Present logo
