= Time in Algeria =

Time in Africa: Light Blue / Cape Verde Time^{[a]} (UTC−1); Blue / Greenwich Mean Time (UTC); Red / Central European Time; West Africa Time; (UTC+1)^{[b]}; Yellow / Central Africa Time; Eastern European Time; South African Standard Time; (UTC+2); Ochre / Egypt Standard Time (UTC+2); Ochre / Egypt Summer Time (UTC+3); Green / East Africa Time (UTC+3); Turquoise / Mauritius Time^{[d]}; Seychelles Time^{[d]}; (UTC+4)^{a} The islands of Cape Verde lie west of the African mainland.^{b} In September 2026, Morocco will switch permanently to Greenwich Mean Time.^{d} Mauritius and the Seychelles lie to the east and northeast of Madagascar, respectively.

Algeria Standard Time or DPRA Standard Time is the time zone for Algeria. It is 1 hour ahead of GMT/UTC (UTC+01:00) and is co-linear with neighboring Tunisia.

== IANA time zone database ==
The IANA time zone database contains one zone for Algeria in the file zone.tab.

c.c.	Coordinates	Timezone name	Comments	UTC offset (Std.)	UTC offset (DST)
DZ	+3647+00303	Africa/Algiers		+01:00	—N/a
