= Algerian Women's Cup =

Algerian Women's Cup كأس الجزائر للسيدات
- Founded: 1998; 28 years ago
- Region: Algeria
- Current champions: JS Kabylie (2nd title)
- Most championships: ASE Alger Centre (10 titles)
- 2026–27 W-Cup

The Algerian Women's Cup (Arabic: كأس الجزائر للسيدات) is a women's association football competition in Algeria. pitting regional teams against each other. It was established in 1998. It is the women's equivalent of the Algerian Cup for men. AS Sûreté Nationale won the last edition for the third time.

== History ==
The competition started on 1998. The first winners was Flambeau de Blida.

== Finals ==
Year	Winners	Score	Runners-up	Venue
1998–99	Flambeau de Blida	3–1	FC Béjaïa	
1999–00	ASE Alger Centre	3–0	FC Constantine	
2000–01	ASE Alger Centre	2–1	AS Intissar Oran	
2001–02	ASE Alger Centre	3–2	AS Intissar Oran	
2002–03	ASE Alger Centre	3–2	AS Evasion Béjaïa	Stade Hamid Chebcheb, Rouïba
2003–04	ASE Alger Centre	2–1	AS Intissar Oran	Stade Hamid Chebcheb, Rouïba
2004–05	ASE Alger Centre	6–1	CSF Oran	Stade des Frères Lamali, Chéraga
2005–06	ASE Alger Centre	4–1	AS Evasion Béjaïa	Stade Djilali Bounaama, Boumerdès
2006–07	ASE Alger Centre	7–2	AS Jawharet Canastel	Stade Olympique de Koléa, Tipaza
2007–08	ASE Alger Centre	1–0	Afak Relizane	Stade Saïd Ould-Moussa, Hydra
2008–09	ASE Alger Centre	1–0	Afak Relizane	Stade Ali Benfedda, Zéralda
2009–10	Afak Relizane	3–0	ASE Alger Centre	Stade Ali Benfedda, Zéralda
2010–11	Afak Relizane	0–0 (3–2 p)	CLT Belouizdad	Stade Ali Benfedda, Zéralda
2011–12	Afak Relizane	2–1	FC Constantine	Stade Ali Benfedda, Zéralda
2012–13	Afak Relizane	5–0	FC Constantine	Stade des Frères Brakni, Blida
2013–14	Afak Relizane	4–1	FC Constantine	Stade de Aïn Beïda, Algiers
2014–15	AS Sûreté Nationale	0–0 (3–1 p)	FC Constantine	Stade Djilali Bounaama, Boumerdès
2015–16	Afak Relizane	2–1	FC Constantine	Stade Djilali Bounaama, Boumerdès
2016–17	AS Sûreté Nationale	3–1	JF Khroub	Stade 8 Mai 1945, Sétif
2017–18	FC Constantine	1–1 (4–2 p)	AS Sûreté Nationale	Abdelkader Chabou Stadium, Annaba
2018–19	AS Sûreté Nationale	2–1	FC Constantine	Mustapha Tchaker Stadium, Blida
2019–20	cancelled in round of 16 because of the COVID-19 pandemic in Algeria			
2020–21	not played			
2021–22	not played			
2022–23	JF Khroub	0–0 (4–3 p)	CS Constantine	Mohamed Hamlaoui Stadium, Constantine
2023–24	CF Akbou	0–0 (5–4 p)	CS Constantine	Salem Mabrouki Stadium, Rouïba
2024–25	JS Kabylie	3–1	CF Akbou	Mustapha Tchaker Stadium, Blida
2025–26	JS Kabylie	1–0	Afak Relizane	Mustapha Tchaker Stadium, Blida
2026–27		–		

- CS Constantine (ex. FC Constantine)

== Most successful clubs ==
Club	Winners	Runners-up	Winning Cups	Runners-up
ASE Alger Centre	10	1	2000, 2001, 2002, 2003, 2004, 2005, 2006, 2007, 2008, 2009	2010
Afak Relizane	6	2	2010, 2011, 2012, 2013, 2014, 2016	2008, 2009
AS Sûreté Nationale (Algiers)	3	1	2015, 2017, 2019	2018
JS Kabylie	2	0	2025, 2026	
CS Constantine	1	9	2018	2000, 2012, 2013, 2014, 2015, 2016, 2019, 2023, 2024
JF Khroub	1	1	2023	2017
CF Akbou	1	1	2024	2025
Flambeau de Blida	1	0	1999	
AS Intissar Oran	0	3		2001, 2002, 2004
AS Evasion Béjaïa	0	2		2003, 2006
FC Béjaïa	0	1		1999
CSF Oran	0	1		2005
CSA Jawharet Canastel (Oran)	0	1		2007
CLT Belouizdad (Algiers)	0	1		2011

- CSA Jawharet Canastel (ex. AS Jawharet Canastel)

== See also ==
- Algerian Women's Championship
- Algerian Women's League Cup
- Algerian Women's Super Cup
