= Algerian Women's Championship D2 =

National Championship D2
- Organising body: LNFF (FAF)
- Founded: 2008; 18 years ago
- Country: Algeria
- Confederation: CAF
- Number of clubs: 27
- Level on pyramid: 2
- Promotion to: Elite National Championship
- Relegation to: National Championship D3
- Domestic cup: Algerian W-Cup
- Current champions: JS Saoura (Gr. East); MC Alger (Gr. Center); MC Oran (Gr. West) (2025-26)
- Website: lnff.dz
- Current: 2026–27 National Champ. D2

The National Championship Division 2 (Arabic: البطولة الوطنية للقسم الثاني) is the second-highest division of women's association football in Algeria. The competition is run by the Ligue Nationale du Football Féminin under the auspices of the Algerian Football Federation.

== History ==
Ten years after the creation of the first women's division in 1998, a national league of two divisions (D1 and D2) was created in the 2008–09 season under the auspices of the Ligue Nationale du Football (LNF). The level was named Division 2 National Championship, it changed the name to Division 1 National Championship since the 2022–23 season after creation of the third division. From the 2025–26 edition, the competition returned to it initial name.

== Champions ==
The list of winners and runners-up:

| Year | Groups | Winners | Runners-up |
|---|---|---|---|
| 2008–09 | | | |
| 2009–10 | | | |
| 2010–11 | | | |
| 2011–12 | — | AS Intissar Oran ^{P} | |
| 2012–13 | West | AS Jawharat Canastel^{P} | |
| 2012–13 | Center | AS Sûreté Nationale ^{P} | |
| 2012–13 | East | MO Khroub ^{P} | |
| 2013–14 | | | |
| 2014–15 | | | |
| 2015–16 | Center-west | SF El Attaf ^{P} | |
| 2015–16 | Center-east | AFW Oum Bouaghi ^{P} | |
| 2016–17 | Center-west | ESF Amizour ^{P} | |
| 2016–17 | Center-east | AC Biskra ^{P} | |
| 2017–18 | — | SMB Touggourt ^{P} | |
| 2018–19 | Center-west | AS Oran Centre ^{P} | |
| 2018–19 | Center-east | AR Guelma ^{P} | |
| 2019–20 | canceled because of the COVID-19 pandemic in Algeria | | |
| 2020–21 | canceled | | |
| 2021–22 | canceled | | |
| 2022–23 | Center-west | AS Evasion Bejaia ^{P} | CSASF Temouchent |
| 2022–23 | Center-east | USF Bejaia ^{P} | Wafa Hassi Messaoud |
| 2023–24 | Center-west | AS Oran Centre ^{P} | ASO Chlef |
| 2023–24 | Center-east | CE Atletic Setif ^{P} | CFN Boumerdes |
| 2024–25 | West | RS Tissemsilt ^{P} | CSA Jawharat Canastel |
| 2024–25 | Center | JS Kabylie ^{P} | CR Belouizdad ^{P} (Note: CSA Jawharat Canastel finished season as the best 2nd team ranked, however CR Belouizdad promoted to 2025–26 Elite Division by decision of LNFF.) |
| 2024–25 | East | ALS Batna ^{P} | Olympique M'chedallah |
| 2024–25 | South | AC Biskra ^{P} | EFJB Ouargla |
| 2025–26 | West | MC Oran ^{P} | MC El Bayadh |
| 2025–26 | Center | MC Alger ^{P} | USM Alger ^{P} |
| 2025–26 | East | JS Saoura ^{P} | ES Sétif |
| 2026–27 | West | | |
| 2026–27 | Center | | |
| 2026–27 | East | | |

Notes:

- In ^{P} are the teams who were promoted to Elite National Championship.
- CSA Jawharat Canastel (ex. AS Jawharat Canastel).

== See also ==
- Elite National Championship
