= Boudjemaa Souidani Stadium =

Multi-use stadium in Guelma, Algeria

- ملعب بوجمعة سويداني
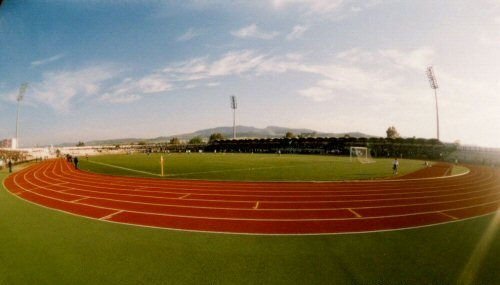
- Interactive map of Boudjemaa Souidani Stadium
- Full name: Boudjemaa Souidani Stadium
- Location: Guelma, Algeria
- Coordinates: 36.47°N 7.45°E
- Owner: OPOW Guelma
- Capacity: 15,000
- Surface: Artificial turf

Construction
- Groundbreaking: 1984
- Opened: 1986

Tenant
- ES Guelma

The Boudjemaa Souidani Stadium (Arabic: ملعب بوجمعة سويداني), is a multi-use stadium in Guelma, Algeria. It is currently used mostly for football matches and is the home ground of ES Guelma. The stadium holds 15,000 spectators.

It was named after Boudjemaa Souidani, former player of ES Guelma and member of the "Group of 22" which was the Revolutionary Committee of Unity and Action to the outbreak of the Algerian revolution.
