= Tahar Zoughari Stadium =

Building in Algeria

Coordinates: 35.7326°N 0.5450°E

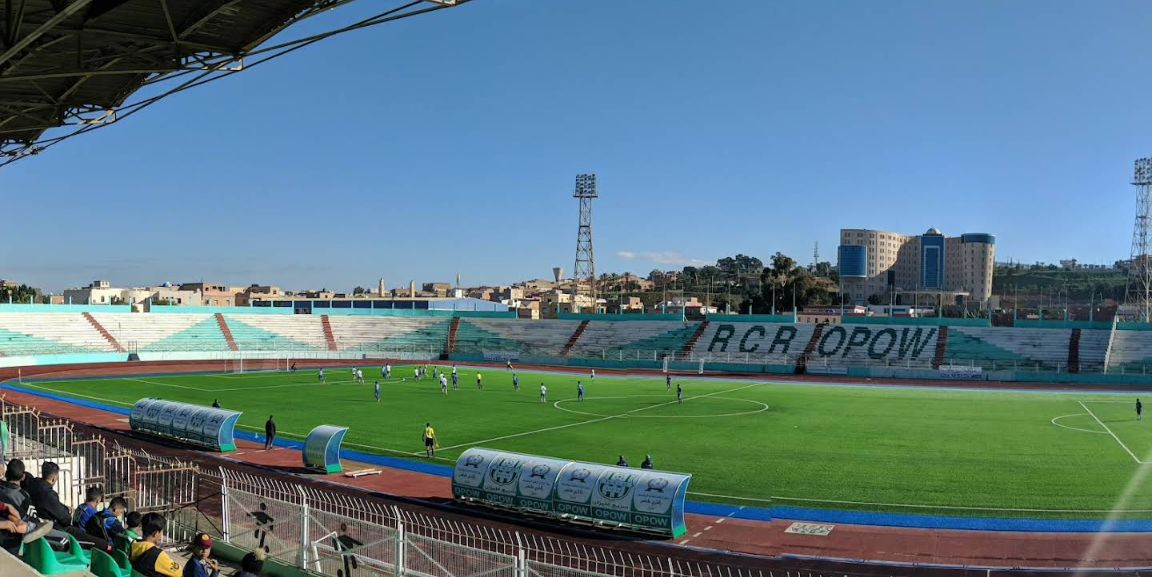
- Interactive map of Tahar Zoughari Stadium
- Full name: Tahar Zoughari Stadium
- Location: Relizane, Algeria
- Owner: APC Relizane
- Capacity: 30,000
- Surface: Artificial turf

Construction
- Opened: 18 March 1987; 39 years ago

Tenant
- RC Relizane

Tahar Zoughari Stadium (Arabic: ملعب طاهر زوقاري) is a multi-use stadium in Relizane, Algeria. It is mostly for football matches. The stadium holds 30,000 people. RC Relizane are tenants. The stadium was opened on 18 March 1987.
