= Akbou =

Akbou Aqbʷu, ⴰⵇⴱⵓ (Kabyle)
- Commune and town
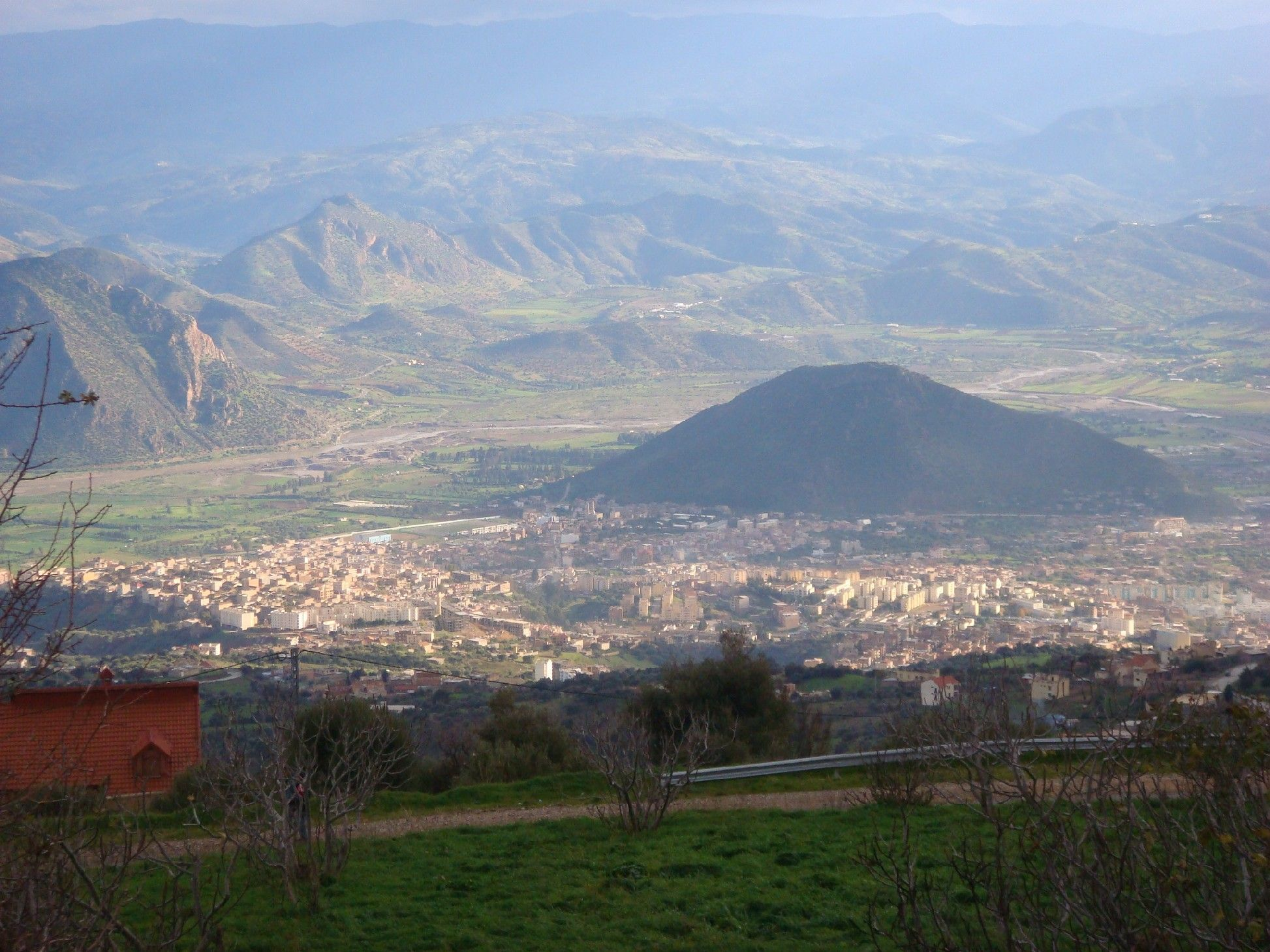

- Location within Algeria
- Coordinates: 36°28′N 4°32′E
- Country: Algeria
- Province: Béjaïa

Area
  - Total: 52.18 km^{2} (20.15 sq mi)
- Elevation: 280 m (920 ft)

Population (2008)
  - Total: 52,300
  - Density: 1,000/km^{2} (2,600/sq mi)
- Time zone: UTC+1 (WAT)

Akbou (Kabyle: Aqvu, ⴰⵇⴱⵓ) is a town in the Kabylie region in northern Algeria in Béjaïa Province. It is a growing city with a population of 52,300 in 2008.

== History ==
The modern town of Akbou was established by the French in 1874. However, the area was occupied in ancient times by the Romans and contains a Roman mausoleum in the middle of the Soummam valley.

Bou Baghli had earlier organized the uprising in Kabylie against the French conquest in 1851. The French recognized the strategic importance of the area on the Soummam river and set up a stronghold. The area was again subject to an uprising in 1871, but the French troops led a ruthless suppression. The fertile land in the Soummam valley was destined for settlement and shortly afterwards was established in 1874.

== Geography ==
Akbou is located in the upper Soummam River valley on the eastern flank of the Djurdjura. It is bounded to the north by Ouzellaguen, east by the Soummam River, which separates it from the commune of Amalou, south-east by the Sahel River, locally called "assif abbas", which separates it from the communes of Ait R'Zine, to the south by Tazmalt, to the west by the municipality of Ighram and north-west by the town of Chellata. It is located at an average altitude of 280 m, and the commune covers an area of 52.18 square kilometers, comprising two distinct areas: the urban area and peripheries on the plain such as the villages Lazib and Colonel Amirouche (ex. Riquet).

== Economy ==
Akbou plays an important economic role in the region because of its industrial base. The valley has attracted much investment and large state enterprises as Alcovel, Mac and Soum Sonaric, Soummam, General Emballage and Ramdy.

There are two large markets. The first is a wholesale market for fruits and vegetables ranked third nationally. The second is a market for vehicles and displays an average of 5,000 vehicles every Friday.

Akbou will benefit from the contribution of the large Tichy Haf Dam located not far from the city. Three large reservoirs created are scheduled to meet both the needs of people from industry and agriculture.

With a municipal budget of almost 700 million dinars, Akbou is a wealthy city that is growing rapidly.

== Culture and heritage ==
=== Monuments ===
The Ausium Mausoleum, situated on the peak of Akbou, is over 2,000 years old. It is assumed it was built by the Romans.

=== Petra Castle ===
Note the existence of the historical castle of Petra, located at a place called Mlakou, 8 km north-east of Akbou. It was destroyed by Theodosius in the war against Firmus.

== Bibliography ==
- Robin, Noël, Histoire du chérif Bou Bar'la, Alger, A. Jourdan, 1884, 294 p.
- Robin, Noël, Notes historiques sur la Grande Kabylie de 1838 à 1851, Alger, 1905, 269 p.
- Rinn, Louis, Histoire de l’insurrection de 1871 en Algérie, Alger, 1891, 672 p.
- Mahe, Alain, Histoire de la Grande Kabylie, XIXe-XXe siècles. Anthropologie historique du lien social dans les communautés villageoises, Editions Bouchene, 2001, 650 p.,
