= Zeyneb Kandouci =

Algerian footballer (born 1994)

Personal information
- Date of birth: 16 March 1994 (age 32)
- Place of birth: Mecheria, Algeria
- Positions: Defender; midfielder

Team information
- Current team: MC Oran
- Number: 11

Youth career
- –2009: Sonatrach Academy

Senior career*
Years	Team	Apps	(Gls)
2009–2013	Afak Relizane		
2013–2014	AS Intissar Oran		
2014–2017	AS Sûreté Nationale		
2017–2019	JF Khroub		
2019–2022	Afak Relizane		
2022–2023	CS Constantine		
2023	Afak Relizane		
2023–2024	Phoenix	10	
2024	Etihad	21	(3)
2025	Phoenix		
2025–2026	CF Akbou		
2026–	MC Oran		

International career
2010–	Algeria	6	(0)
- * Club domestic league appearances and goals as of 6 September 2026

Zeyneb Kandouci (Arabic: زينب قندوسي; born 16 March 1994) is an Algerian professional footballer who plays as a midfielder for Algerian Women's League 1 club MC Oran and the Algeria national team.

== Club career ==
Kandouci began her football journey at the age of five and joined Afak Relizane at fourteen, where she played from 2009 to 2013. During this period, she won five Algerian Championships, four Algerian Cups, and two Maghreb Tournaments. In 2013, she moved to AS Intissar Oran, securing the Under-20 Algerian Cup, before transferring to AS Sûreté Nationale from 2014 to 2018, where she added two more Cups and a League Cup to her achievements.

In July 2021 She Participated with Afak Relizane in the inaugural CAF Women's Champions League qualifiers and scored a goal against AS Banque de l'Habitat.

On 16 May 2024, Etihad announced the signing of Kandouci. she participated with the club in the inaugural AFC Women's Champions League.

== International career ==
Kandouci is a current Algerian international who has represented the Algeria national team at the senior level since 2010. During which, she was included in the final squad for the 2018 Women's Africa Cup of Nations, the 2020 UNAF Women's Tournament, and the 2021 Arab Women's Cup.

== Honours ==
Afak Relizane

- Algerian Women's Championship: 2009–10, 2010–11, 2011–12, 2012–13, 2013–14
- Algerian Women's Cup: 2009–10, 2010–11, 2011–12, 2012–13

AS Sûreté Nationale

- Algerian Women's Cup: 2014–15, 2016–17
- Algerian Women's League Cup: 2017–18

Etihad

- Jordan Women's Pro League: 2024
- Women's Jordan Cup: 2024
