= 2023 CAF Women's Champions League UNAF Qualifiers =

تصفيات إتحاد شمال إفريقيا المؤهلة لدوري أبطال إفريقيا للسيدات 2023

Tournament details
- Host country: Egypt
- City: Alexandria
- Dates: 22–30 August
- Teams: 4 (from 4 associations)
- Venues: 2 (in 1 host city)

Final positions
- Champions: (Morocco) SC Casablanca (1st title)
- Runners-up: (Algeria) Afak Relizane
- Third place: (Egypt) Wadi Degla
- Fourth place: (Tunisia) ASF Sousse

Tournament statistics
- Matches played: 6
- Goals scored: 36 (6 per match)
- Top scorer(s): (Algeria) Naïma Bouhenni (7 goals)
- All statistics correct as of 30 August 2023.

The 2023 CAF Women's Champions League UNAF Qualifiers was the 3rd edition of the CAF Women's Champions League UNAF Qualifiers tournament organised by the UNAF for the women's clubs of association nations. This edition was held from 22 to 30 August 2023 in Alexandria, Egypt. The winners of the tournament qualified for the 2023 CAF Women's Champions League final tournament to be held in Ivory Coast.

== Participating teams ==
The following four teams contested in the qualifying tournament. AS FAR from Morocco were the 2022 CAF Women's Champions League champions and therefore qualified automatically as title holders of the final tournament.

Team	Qualifying method	Appearances	Previous best performance
(Algeria) Afak Relizane	2022–23 Algerian Women's champions	3rd	Second place (2021)
(Egypt) Wadi Degla	2023 Egyptian League champions	2nd	First place (2022)
(Morocco) SC Casablanca	2022–23 Moroccan Women's runners-up	1st	Debut
(Tunisia) ASF Sousse	2022–23 Tunisian Women's champions	1st	Debut

== Venues ==
The Miloud Hadefi Stadium in Oran, Algeria was shosen on first to hosts the qualifying tournament. But on 6 August 2023, CAF decided changing the venue to Alexandria, Egypt.

2023 CAF Women's Champions League UNAF Qualifiers is located in Egypt	Alexandria	
2023 CAF Women's Champions League UNAF Qualifiers is located in Egypt	Alexandria Stadium	Haras El Hodoud Stadium
2023 CAF Women's Champions League UNAF Qualifiers is located in Egypt	Capacity: 13,660	Capacity: 22,000

== Match officials ==
The following referees were chosen for the tournament.

=== Referees ===
- (Algeria) Lamia Athmane
- (Egypt) Shahanda Saad Al-Maghraby
- (Morocco) Ihsane Nouajli
- (Tunisia) Asma Chouchene

=== Assistant referees ===
- (Algeria) Asma Feriel Ouahab
- (Algeria) Sarah Kemmad
- (Egypt) Yara Atef
- (Egypt) Gemalat Shebl
- (Morocco) Zakia El Krini
- (Morocco) Karima Khadri
- (Tunisia) Khouloud Amri
- (Tunisia) Nesrine Ouertani

== Qualifying tournament ==
Pos	Team	Pld	W	D	L	GF	GA	GD	Pts	Qualification	SCC	AFR	WDG	ASFS
1	(Morocco) SC Casablanca	3	3	0	0	13	5	+8	9	Main tournament	—	4–3	6–1	
2	(Algeria) Afak Relizane	3	2	0	1	12	5	+7	6			—		
3	(Egypt) Wadi Degla (H)	3	1	0	2	7	13	−6	3			1–4	—	
4	(Tunisia) ASF Sousse	3	0	0	3	4	13	−9	0		1–3	0–5	3–5	—

Source: unafonline.org
(H) Hosts
24 August 2023
17:00

SC Casablanca (Morocco)	4–3	(Algeria) Afak Relizane
Sal. Miftah 16'; Mourtaji 25', 80'; A. Diarra 90+3'	Report	Kandouci 28' (pen.), 40' (pen.); Bouhenni 45'

Alexandria Stadium, Alexandria
Referee: Shahenda ElMaghrabi (Egypt)
24 August 2023
20:00

ASF Sousse (Tunisia)	3–5	(Egypt) Wadi Degla
Ben Khalifa 55'; Jeddi 56'; Ben Ali 65'	Report	Zouwairatou 17', 19', 40'; G. Mahmoud 27', 39'

Alexandria Stadium, Alexandria
Referee: Zakia El Grini (Morocco)

27 August 2023
17:00

Wadi Degla (Egypt)	1–4	(Algeria) Afak Relizane
El Sayed 72'	Report	Bouhenni 7', 24', 53', 90+5'

Alexandria Stadium, Alexandria
Referee: Asma Chouchane (Tunisia)
27 August 2023
20:00

ASF Sousse (Tunisia)	1–3	(Morocco) SC Casablanca
Jemai 29' (pen.)	Report	Mourtaji 1', 22', 90+4'

Alexandria Stadium, Alexandria
Referee: Lamia Atman (Algeria)

30 August 2023
18:00

ASF Sousse (Tunisia)	0–5	(Algeria) Afak Relizane
	Report	Arbi Aouda 10'; Bouhenni 22', 72'; Daoudi 85'; Ayad 90' (pen.)

Haras El Hodoud Stadium, Alexandria
Referee: Shahenda ElMaghrabi (Egypt)
30 August 2023
18:00

SC Casablanca (Morocco)	6–1	(Egypt) Wadi Degla
Kokora 20'; A. Diarra 22'; Tammar 35'; Adel 73' (o.g.); Miftah 87'; Koffi 90+4'	Report	Zouwairatou 12'

Alexandria Stadium, Alexandria
Referee: Asma Chouchane (Tunisia)

== Statistics ==
=== Goalscorers ===
There have been 36 goals scored in 6 matches, for an average of 6 goals per match (as of 30 August 2023).

Rank	Player	Team	Goals
1	(Algeria) Naïma Bouhenni	(Algeria) Afak Relizane	7
2	(Morocco) Chaymaa Mourtaji	(Morocco) SC Casablanca	5
3	(Cameroon) Moussa Zouwairatou	(Egypt) Wadi Degla SC	4
4	(Algeria) Zeyneb Kandouci	(Algeria) Afak Relizane	2
4	(Egypt) Gihan Mahmoud	(Egypt) Wadi Degla SC	2
4	(Morocco) Samya Miftah	(Morocco) SC Casablanca	2
7	(Algeria) Kelthoum Arbi Aouda	(Algeria) Afak Relizane	1
7	(Algeria) Hedda Ayad	(Algeria) Afak Relizane	1
7	(Algeria) Fouzia Daoudi	(Algeria) Afak Relizane	1
7	(Egypt) Manar El Sayed	(Egypt) Wadi Degla SC	1
7	(Ivory Coast) Nadège Koffi	(Morocco) SC Casablanca	1
7	(Ivory Coast) Adjoua Sylvaine Kokora	(Morocco) SC Casablanca	1
7	(Mali) Agueicha Diarra	(Morocco) SC Casablanca	1
7	(Morocco) Salma Tammar	(Morocco) SC Casablanca	1
7	(Tunisia) Chiraz Ben Ali	(Tunisia) ASF Sousse	1
7	(Tunisia) Aya Ben Khalifa	(Tunisia) ASF Sousse	1
7	(Tunisia) Aya Jeddi	(Tunisia) ASF Sousse	1
7	(Tunisia) Yasmine Jemai	(Tunisia) ASF Sousse	1
–	(Egypt) Samr Adel	(Egypt) Wadi Degla SC (vs SC Casablanca)	o.g.

== Broadcasting rights ==
Territory	Broadcaster	Ref.
North Africa	UNAF Youtube Channel	
Egypt	On Sport	
