= Tunisian Women's Championship D2 =

- Organising body: LNFF
- Founded: 2004; 22 years ago
- Country: Tunisia
- Confederation: CAF (Africa)
- Number of clubs: 12 (2024–23)
- Level on pyramid: 2
- Relegation to: -
- Current champions: ASF Sousse (1s ttitle) (2014–15)
- Most championships: -
- Website: ftf.org.tn
- Current: 2024-25 W-Championship D2

The Tunisian Women's Championship D2 (Arabic: البطولة التونسية للسيدات المستوى الثاني) is the second flight of women's association football in Tunisia. It is the women's equivalent of the Ligue 2. The competition is run by the Ligue Nationale du Football Féminin (LNFF) under the auspices of the Tunisian Football Federation.

== History ==
The first Tunisian women's championship D2 was contested in 2004–05 season.

== Champions ==
The list of champions:

Season	Champions
2004–05	Stade féminin de Sfax
2005–06	Ribat sportif de Monastir
2006–07	Leptis sportive féminine de Lamta
2007–08	Association sportive des PTT de Bizerte
2008–09	Stade féminin de Kairouan
2009–10	Espoir sportif féminin de Djedeida (poule nord) / Association sportive féminine de Gafsa (poule sud)
2010–11	not known
2011–12	not known
2012–13	Cité universitaire Bardo II
2013–14	Majd sportif féminin de Sidi Bouzid
2014–15	Association sportive féminine de Sousse
2015–25	not known
2025–26	competition held awaiting champion info

== Most successful clubs ==
Rank	Club	Champions	Winning seasons
1	ASF Sahel	3	2008–09, 2011–12, 2012–13
2	AS Banque de l'Habitat	1	2007–08
3	ASF Sousse	1	2014–15
4	Stade féminin de Sfax	1	2004–05
5	Ribat sportif de Monastir	1	2005–06
6	Leptis sportive féminine de Lamta	1	2006–07
7	Stade féminin de Kairouan	1	2008–09
8	Espoir sportif féminin de Djedeida	1	2009–10 (poule nord)
9	Association sportive féminine de Gafsa	1	2009–10 (poule sud)
10	Cité universitaire Bardo II	1	2012–13
11	Majd sportif féminin de Sidi Bouzid	1	2013–14

== See also ==
- Tunisian Women's Cup
- Tunisian Women's Super Cup
- Tunisian Women's League Cup
- National Union of Tunisian Women Cup
- Tunisian Women's Championship
