= Afak Relizane =

Algerian football club

- Full name: Afak Chabab Relizane
- Nickname: El Afak
- Founded: 21 August 1995 (31 years ago)
- Ground: Tahar Zoughari Stadium; Relizane, Algeria
- Capacity: 30,000
- President: Rachida Benallou
- Head Coach: Sid Ahmed Mouaz
- League: Algerian Women's Championship
- 2022–23: Champions
Home colours	Away colours

Afak Chabab Relizane (Arabic: آفاق شباب غليزان, lit. 'Relizane Youth Horizons') is a women's professional football club based in Relizane, Algeria. The club is playing in the Algerian Women's Championship, the top division in the Algerian female football league system.

== History ==
Afak Relizane was founded in 21 August 1995 to encourage the practice of sports by young people from Relizane during the Algerian Civil War. The club is one of the most successful in Algerian women's football clubs.

In 2021, the team participated in the first edition of the African Champions League; they finished in second place in the 2021 CAF CL - UNAF zone qualifiers. In August 2022, Afak Relizane became the first women's Algerian club to be professional, this statue was done by the Confederation of African Football (CAF).

== Crest ==
Old logo

Present logo

== Players ==
=== Current squad ===
As of 27 August 2023

Note: Flags indicate national team as defined under FIFA eligibility rules; some limited exceptions apply. Players may hold more than one non-FIFA nationality.

No.	Pos.	Nation	Player
—	GK	ALG	Hadda Ayad
—	GK	ALG	Kaoutar Saïda Meghelli
—	DF	ALG	Kelthoum Arbi Aouda (c)
—	DF	ALG	Naïma Barkat
—	DF	ALG	Nadjah Djorni
—	DF	ALG	Djawhar Nafissa Hadji
—	DF	ALG	Faiza Messaouer
—	DF	ALG	Fatiha Belkadi
—	DF	ALG	Habiba Sadou
—	MF	ALG	Halima Meçabih
—	MF	ALG	Aïcha Hamidèche
—	MF	ALG	Zeyneb Kendouci

No.	Pos.	Nation	Player
—	FW	ALG	Bachra Benhadda
—	FW	ALG	Naïma Bouhani
—	FW	ALG	Fatiha Benssaha
—	FW	ALG	Linda Boussebih
—	FW	ALG	Amina Chahinez Hemour
—	FW	ALG	Khadidja Khelifouche
—	FW	ALG	Ikram Bahri
—	FW	ALG	Fatima Zohra Nouara
—	FW	ALG	Houria Affak
—		ALG	Amel Kheira Benabdellah
—		ALG	Selma Aifaoui
—		ALG	Fouzia Daoudi

=== Notable players ===
- (Algeria) Naïma Bouhani
- (Algeria) Sabrina Mansouri
- (Algeria) Fatima Sekouane

== Coaching staff ==
=== Current coaching staff ===
Position	Staff
Manager	(Algeria) Sid Ahmed Mouaz
Assistant manager	...
Senior goalkeeping coach	...
Fitness coaches	...

=== Manager history ===
Dates	Name	Notes
–	...	
–	(Algeria) Sid Ahmed Mouaz	
2011–2012	(Algeria) Soraya Bouabdellah	
–present	(Algeria) Sid Ahmed Mouaz	

== Presidents ==
Afak Relizane
From	To	President
		(Algeria) Belhadj Djelloul Bouazza
	present	(Algeria) Rachida Benallou

== Honours ==
=== National titles ===
- Algerian Women's Championship
  - Winners (11): 2010, 2011, 2012, 2013, 2014, 2015, 2016, 2017, 2021, 2022, 2023
  - Runners-up (7): 2000, 2002, 2003, 2004, 2008, 2009, 2019
- Algerian Women's Cup
  - Winners (6): 2010, 2011, 2012, 2013, 2014, 2016
  - Runners-up (2): 2008, 2009
- Algerian Women's Super Cup
  - Runners-up (1): 2016

=== Continental and Regional titles ===
- CAF Women's Champions League UNAF Qualifiers
  - Runners-up (2): 2021, 2023
- Maghreb Women's Club Tournament
  - Winners (2): 2010, 2012
  - Runners-up (1): 2011
- UNAF U-20 Women's Club Tournament
  - Winners (1): 2024

== Performance in CAF competitions ==
- CAF Women's Champions League: 3 appearances

2021 – UNAF qualifiers round
2022 – UNAF qualifiers round
2023 – UNAF qualifiers round
2025 – UNAF qualifiers round
