= 2022 CAF Women's Champions League UNAF Qualifiers =

تصفيات إتحاد شمال إفريقيا المؤهلة لدوري أبطال إفريقيا للسيدات 2022

Tournament details
- Host country: Morocco
- City: Agadir
- Dates: 12–21 August
- Teams: 3 (from 3 associations)

Final positions
- Champions: (Egypt) Wadi Degla (1st title)
- Runners-up: (Tunisia) AS Banque de l'Habitat
- Third place: (Algeria) Afak Relizane

Tournament statistics
- Matches played: 3
- Goals scored: 8 (2.67 per match)
- Top scorer: Nouha Saleh (4 goals)

The 2022 CAF Women's Champions League UNAF Qualifiers is the 2nd edition of the CAF Women's Champions League UNAF Qualifiers tournament organised by the UNAF for the women's clubs of association nations. This edition was held from 12 to 21 August 2022 in Agadir, Morocco. The winners of the tournament qualified for the 2022 CAF Women's Champions League final tournament to be held in Morocco. Wadi Degla were the champions.

Afak Relizane, the favorite, finished third; seven of his players had COVID-19 and didn't take part in the tournament.

== Participating teams ==
The following three teams contested in the qualifying tournament. AS FAR from Morocco were the 2022 Moroccan League champions and therefore qualified automatically as the hosts of the final tournament.

Team	Qualifying method	Appearances	Previous best performance
(Algeria) Afak Relizane	2021–22 Algerian Women's champions	2nd	Second place (2021)
(Egypt) Wadi Degla	2022 Egyptian League champions	1st	Debut
(Tunisia) AS Banque de l'Habitat	2021–22 Tunisian Women's champions	2nd	Third place (2021)

== Venues ==
Cities	Venues	Capacity
Agadir	Stade Adrar	45,480

== Qualifying tournament ==
Pos	Team	Pld	W	D	L	GF	GA	GD	Pts	Qualification	WDG	ASB	AFR
1	(Egypt) Wadi Degla	2	2	0	0	4	0	+4	6	Main tournament	—	2–0	
2	(Tunisia) AS Banque de l'Habitat	2	1	0	1	3	3	0	3			—	3–1
3	(Algeria) Afak Relizane	2	0	0	2	1	5	−4	0		0–2		—

Source: www.unafonline.org
14 August 2022
18:00 GMT+1

AS Banque de l'Habitat (Tunisia)	3–1	(Algeria) Afak Relizane
Riabi 9'; Khezri 49'; Ben Mohamed 56'	Report	Affak 6'

Stade Adrar, Agadir

17 August 2022
18:00 GMT+1

Afak Relizane (Algeria)	0–2	(Egypt) Wadi Degla
	Report	Saleh 36', 52'

Stade Adrar, Agadir

20 August 2022
18:00 GMT+1

Wadi Degla (Egypt)	2–0	(Tunisia) AS Banque de l'Habitat
Saleh 62', 90'	Report

Stade Adrar, Agadir

== Statistics ==
=== Goalscorers ===
There have been 8 goals scored in 3 matches, for an average of 2.67 goals per match (as of 20 August 2022).

Rank	Player	Team	Goals
1	(Egypt) Nouha Saleh	(Egypt) Wadi Degla	4
2	(Algeria) Houria Affak	(Algeria) Afak Relizane	1
2	(Tunisia) Ibtissem Ben Mohamed	(Tunisia) AS Banque de l'Habitat	1
2	(Tunisia) Cheima Khezri	(Tunisia) AS Banque de l'Habitat	1
2	(Tunisia) Racha Riabi	(Tunisia) AS Banque de l'Habitat	1
