= 2017–18 Algerian Women's League Cup =

Women's League Cup

Tournament details
- Country: Algeria
- Teams: 16

Final positions
- Champions: AS Sûreté Nationale (1st title)
- Runners-up: FC Constantine

Tournament statistics
- Matches played: 15
- Goals scored: 41 (2.73 per match)

The 2017–18 Algerian Women's League Cup is the 2nd season of the Algerian Women's League Cup. The competition is open to all Algerian Women's clubs participating in the Algerian Women's Championship. AS Sûreté Nationale wins the cup beating FC Constantine in the final match played in Ahmed Zabana Stadium, Oran.

== Round of 16 ==
The first round of the cup was played over 26–27 January 2018.

Home team	Score	Away team	Location
COS Tiaret	0–7	JF Khroub	Algiers (Reghaïa)
FC Béjaïa	1–3	CF Akbou	Amizour
ESF Amizour	0–3	ESFOR Tougourt	Constantine (Ramadan Ben-Abdelmalek Stadium)
FJ Skikda	1–0	AS Oran Centre	Algiers (Dar El Beïda)
ARTSF Tébessa	0–0 (4–5 pens)	AS Intissar Oran	Algiers (El Hamiz)
AS Sûreté Nationale	1–0	Affak Relizane	Aïn Defla
FC Constantine	2–0	ASE Alger Centre	Bordj Bou Arréridj
MZ Biskra	3–0	AC Biskra	Biskra (Bordj Ben Azzouz)

== Quarter-finals ==
The quarter finals were played on 22 April 2018.

Home team	Score	Away team	Location
FJ Skikda	0–0 (5-4 pens)	ARTSF Tébessa	El Khroub (Abed Hamdani Stadium)
ESFOR Touggourt	0–6	MZ Biskra	El Mghayar
FC Constantine	1–0	JF Khroub	Constantine (Didouche)
AS Sûreté Nationale	5–0	CF Akbou	Bouïra (Bourouba)

== Semi-finals ==
The semi finals were played on 8 May 2018.

Home team	Score	Away team	Location
AS Sûreté Nationale	6–0	FJ Skikda	Sétif
FC Constantine	2–0	MZ Biskra	Batna (Mustapha Seffouhi Stadium)

== Final ==
The final was played on 15 May 2018.

Home team	Score	Away team	Location
FC Constantine	0–0 (4-5 pens)	AS Sûreté Nationale	Oran (Ahmed Zabana Stadium)
