= Association Sportive Féminine de Bou Hajla =

Association football women's club in Tunisia

- Nickname(s): ASF Bou Hajla
- Founded: 2011 (14 years ago)
- Ground: Tunisia
- President: (Tunisia) Amina Abdellaoui
- Head Coach: (Tunisia) Amina Abdellaoui
- League: Tunisian Women's Championship
- 2023: 1st of 13
Home colours	Away colours

Association Sportive Féminine de Bou Hajla (Arabic: الجمعية الرياضية النسائية ببوحجلة, lit. 'Association Sportive Féminine de Bou Hajla') is a football club based in Bou Hajla, Tunisia .

They have won the championship on one occasion.

== Current squad ==
Note: Flags indicate national team as defined under FIFA eligibility rules; some limited exceptions apply. Players may hold more than one non-FIFA nationality.

No.	Pos.	Nation	Player
—	GK		
—	DF	(Tunisia) TUN	
—	DF	(Tunisia) TUN	
—	MF	(Tunisia) TUN	
—	MF	(Tunisia) TUN	
—	MF	(Tunisia) TUN	
—	MF	(Tunisia) TUN	
—	MF	(Tunisia) TUN	
—	FW	(Tunisia) TUN	
—		(Tunisia) TUN	
—		(Tunisia) TUN	

No.	Pos.	Nation	Player
—	GK		
—	DF		
—	MF		
—	FW		

== Honours ==
=== Domestic ===
League titles

- Tunisian Women's Championship

Winners (1): 2023

- Tunisian Women's Cup

- Tunisian Women's League Cup (Coupe de la Ligue Féminine)

== Performance in CAF competitions ==
- CAF Women's Champions League: 0 appearance

== See also ==
- Tunisian Women's Championship
