= 2009 UNAF Women's Club Tournament =

دورة إتحاد شمال إفريقيا للأندية للسيدات 2009

Tournament details
- Host country: Egypt
- City: Suez
- Dates: 1–9 May
- Teams: 4 (from UNAF confederations)
- Venue: 1 (in 1 host city)

Final positions
- Champions: (Tunisia) ASF Sahel (1st title)
- Runners-up: (Egypt) Wadi Degla

Tournament statistics
- Matches played: 6
- Goals scored: 19 (3.17 per match)
- Top scorer: (Tunisia) Fatma Mlih (5 goals)

The 2009 UNAF Women's Club Tournament is the 3rd edition of the UNAF Women's Club Tournament. The clubs from Algeria, Egypt, Morocco and Tunisia faced off for the title. The Tunisian team ASF Sahel wins the tournament.

== Teams ==
Association	Team	Qualifying method
Algeria	ASE Alger Centre	2007–08 Algerian Women's Championship champions & holders
Egypt	Wadi Degla	2007–08 Egyptian Women's Premier League champions
Morocco	FC Berrechid	2007–08 Moroccan Women's Championship champions
Tunisia	ASF Sahel	2007–08 Tunisian Women's Championship champions
Libya	No representative team	

== Tournament ==
The competition played in a round-robin tournament determined the final standings. It's hosted in Suez, Egypt.

Pos	Team	Pld	W	D	L	GF	GA	GD	Pts	Qualification
1	(Tunisia) ASF Sahel	3	3	0	0	7	2	+5	9	Champions
2	(Egypt) Wadi Degla (H)	3	2	0	1	6	5	+1	6	
3	(Algeria) ASE Alger Centre	3	1	0	2	4	4	0	3	
4	(Morocco) FC Berrechid	3	0	0	3	2	8	−6	0	

(H) Hosts
3 May 2009
--:--

Wadi Degla (Egypt)	2–1	(Algeria) ASE Alger Centre
Haidar 15'; Youssef 20'	Report	Haimour 55'

Suez
3 May 2009
--:--

ASF Sahel (Tunisia)	3–0	(Morocco) FC Berrechid

Suez

5 May 2009
--:--

Wadi Degla (Egypt)	1–2	(Tunisia) ASF Sahel

Suez
5 May 2009
--:--

ASE Alger Centre (Algeria)	2–0	(Morocco) FC Berrechid

Suez

8 May 2009
--:--

Wadi Degla (Egypt)	3–2	(Morocco) FC Berrechid

Suez
8 May 2009
--:--

ASE Alger Centre (Algeria)	1–2	(Tunisia) ASF Sahel
Amloul 45'	Report	Mlih 15', 80'

Suez
