= BH Bank (Tunisia) =

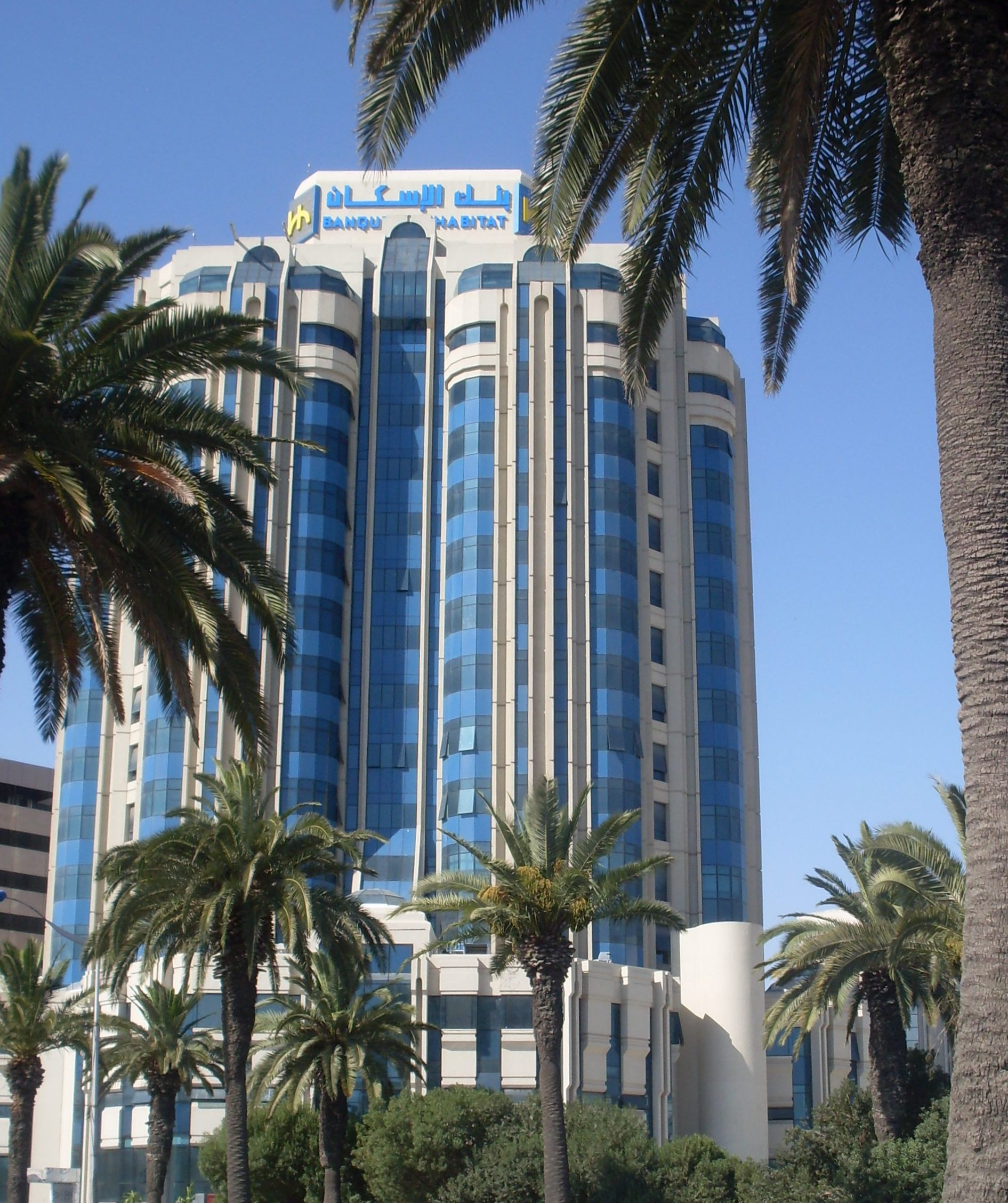
Banque de l'Habitat's headquarters

BH Bank (formerly Banque de l'habitat) is a state-controlled bank in Tunisia. It is listed in the Bourse de Tunis.

The BH headquarters is 75m and 16 floors it was built between 2003 and 2010

The building is one of the Tallest buildings in Tunisia.

== Overview ==
Banque de l'Habitat was founded in 1973 and is headquartered in Tunis, Tunisia. It has 90 million dinars in assets, mostly in real estate.

The Bank owns and manages a Tunisian women's football team called the AS Banque de l'Habitat. The club has won the Tunisian Women's Championship on three occasions and were the first team to represent Tunisia at in the CAF Champions league qualifiers.

Since January 6, 2023 Wajdi Koubaa is the president of BH Bank.
