= 2018–19 Algerian Women's League Cup =

Women's League Cup

Tournament details
- Country: Algeria
- Teams: 12

Final positions
- Champions: FC Constantine (1st title)
- Runners-up: AS Sûreté Nationale

Tournament statistics
- Matches played: 13
- Goals scored: 45 (3.46 per match)

The 2018–19 Algerian Women's League Cup is the 3rd season of the Algerian Women's League Cup. The competition is open to all Algerian Women's clubs participating in the Algerian Women's Championship. FC Constantine wins the cup beating AS Sûreté Nationale in the final match played in Omar Hamadi Stadium, Algiers.

== Round of 16 ==
The first round of the cup was played on 6 October 2018.

Home team	Score	Away team	Location
FC Constantine	8–0	Intissar Oran	Algiers (August 20, 1955 Stadium)
ASE Alger Centre	6–1	ESFOR Touggourt	Constantine (Ramadan Ben-Abdelmalek Stadium)
SMB Touggourt	1–5	FC Béjaia	Biskra (Bordj Ben Azzouz)
Affak Relizane	2–0	JF Khroub	
ESF Amizour	1–0	MZ Biskra	Bordj Bou Arréridj (Stade OPOW de Koléa)
CF Akbou	2–4	AS Sureté Nationale	Bouïra (Bourouba)

== Quarter-finals ==
The quarter finals were played on 5 February 2019.

Home team	Score	Away team	Location
FC Béjaïa	0–4	FC Constantine	Sétif
ASE Alger Centre	2–1	MZ Biskra	Constantine (Ramadan Ben-Abdelmalek Stadium)
CF Akbou	0–0 (4–5 pens)	Affak Relizane	Algiers (Reghaïa)
AS Sûreté Nationale	2–0	ESF Amizour	Bouïra (Bourouba)

== Semi-finals ==
The semi finals were played on 19 February 2019.

Home team	Score	Away team	Location
ASE Alger Centre	0–1	AS Sûreté Nationale	Algiers (Bologhine)
FC Constantine	1–1 (5–4 pens)	Affak Relizane	Algiers (Reghaïa)

== Final ==
The final was played on 7 March 2019.

Home team	Score	Away team	Location
FC Constantine	2–1	AS Sûreté Nationale	Algiers (Omar Hamadi Stadium)
