= UNAF U-20 Women's Club Tournament =

- Founded: 2024
- Region: North Africa (UNAF)
- Teams: 5
- Current champions: (Algeria) Afak Relizane (1st title)
- Most championships: (Algeria) Afak Relizane (1 title)
- Website: unaf-foot.com

The UNAF U-20 Women's Club Tournament (Arabic: دورة إتحاد شمال إفريقيا للأندية للسيدات تحت 20 سنة) is an international women's association football club competition for under 20 run by the Union of North African Football Federations (UNAF). The top club sides from North Africa's football women's leagues for under 20 are invited to participate in this competition.

== History ==
On 5 September 2024, the technical meeting for the UNAF U-20 Women's Club Tournament held in Tunis, which will take place in Tunisia from 5 to 14 September 2024, at the Ariana and El Kram stadiums, with the participation of five clubs, ASF Sousse and US Tunisienne from Tunisia, the Afak Relizane and CF Akbou from Algeria, and Pyramids FC from Egypt.

In the meeting, they agreed that the tournament would be held in the form of a mini-tournament of one group with five rounds, with each team playing four matches, and at the end the team with first place would be crowned the tournament champion.

== Finals ==
UNAF Women's Club Tournament finals
Season	Winners	Score	Runners-up	Venue	Attendance
2024	(Algeria) Afak Relizane	^{n/a}	(Tunisia) ASF Sousse	El Kram Stadium, Tunis	
2025				Tunisia	

^n/a A round-robin tournament determined the final standings.

== Records and statistics ==
=== Performance by club ===
Num	Club	Winners	Runners-up	Years won	Years runners-up
1	(Algeria) Afak Relizane	1	0	2024	
2	(Tunisia) ASF Sousse	0	1		2024

=== Performance by nation ===
Num	Nation	Winners	Runners-up
1	Algeria	1	0
2	Tunisia	0	1

== See also ==
- CAF Women's Champions League UNAF Qualifiers
- UNAF Women's Club Tournament
