= 2019–20 Algerian Women's Championship =

Algerian Women's Championship
- Season: 2019–20
- Champions: JF Khroub
- All statistics correct as of 26 August 2020.

The 2019–20 Algerian Women's Championship was the 22nd season of the Algerian Women's Championship, the Algerian national women's association football competition. On March 15, 2020, the Ligue de Football Féminin (LFF) decided to halt the season due to the COVID-19 pandemic in Algeria and declared that season is over and JF Khroub to be the champion. JF Khroub won the competition for the first time.

== Clubs ==
Team	City
ASE Alger Centre	Algiers
AS Sureté Nationale	Algiers
ESF Amizour	Amizour
FC Béjaia	Béjaïa
MZ 2000 Biskra	Biskra
FC Constantine	Constantine
JF Khroub	El Khroub
AR Guelma	Guelma
AS Intissar Oran	Oran
AS Oran Centre	Oran
CF Akbou	Ouzellaguen
Afak Relizane	Relizane

== Play-off stage ==
Pos.	Team	Pld	W	D	L	GF	GA	GD	Pts	PPG	Qualification or relegation
1	JF Khroub	19							45	2,36	Champions
2	AS Sûreté Nationale	17							40	2,35	
3	Afak Relizane	17							38	2,23	
4	ASE Alger Centre	18							38	2,11	
5	CF Akbou	18							38	2,11	
6	ESF Amizour	19							31	1,63	
7	FC Constantine	17							24	1,41	
8	FC Béjaïa	18							21	1,16	
9	AS Oran Centre	18							12	0,66	
10	AR Guelma	19							10	0,52	
11	AS Intissar Oran	17							5	0,29	
12	MZ 2000 Biskra	19							0	0,15	

Updated to match(es) played on 21 August 2020. Source: lff.dz
Rules for classification: 1) Points; 2) Goal difference; 3) Number of goals scored
