= 2007 UNAF Women's Club Tournament =

دورة إتحاد شمال إفريقيا للأندية للسيدات 2007

Tournament details
- Host country: Tunisia
- City: Tunis
- Dates: 13 – 18 August 2007
- Teams: 4 (from UNAF confederations)
- Venue: 2 (in 1 host city)

Final positions
- Champions: (Morocco) FC Berrechid (1st title)
- Runners-up: (Algeria) ASE Alger Centre

Tournament statistics
- Matches played: 6
- Goals scored: 21 (3.5 per match)

The 2007 UNAF Women's Club Tournament is the first edition of the UNAF Women's Club Tournament. The clubs from Algeria, Egypt, Morocco and Tunisia faced off for the title. The moroccan team FC Berrechid wins the tournament.

== Teams ==
Wadi Degla SC was chosen by the Egyptian Football Association as an Egyptian representative, the Egyptian Women's Premier League was cancelled since the 2002–03 season.

Association	Team	Qualifying method
Algeria	ASE Alger Centre	2005–06 Algerian Women's Championship champions
Egypt	Wadi Degla	Egyptian representative
Morocco	FC Berrechid	2005–06 Moroccan Women's Championship champions
Tunisia	Tunisair Club	2005–06 Tunisian Women's Championship runners-up
Libya	No representative team	

== Tournament ==
The competition played in a round-robin tournament determined the final standings. It's hosted in Tunis, Tunisia.

Pos	Team	Pld	W	D	L	GF	GA	GD	Pts	Qualification
1	(Morocco) FC Berrechid	3	2	1	0	8	3	+5	7	Champions
2	(Algeria) ASE Alger Centre	3	2	1	0	6	2	+4	7	
3	(Egypt) Wadi Degla	3	1	0	2	5	5	0	3	
4	(Tunisia) Tunisair Club (H)	3	0	0	3	2	11	−9	0	

Source: rsssf
(H) Hosts
13 August 2007
--:--

FC Berrechid (Morocco)	1–1	(Algeria) ASE Alger Centre

Manouba Stadium, Tunis
13 August 2007
--:--

Tunisair Club (Tunisia)	1–3	(Egypt) Wadi Degla

Manouba Stadium, Tunis

15 August 2007
--:--

FC Berrechid (Morocco)	2–1	(Egypt) Wadi Degla

Manouba Stadium, Tunis
15 August 2007
--:--

Tunisair Club (Tunisia)	0–3	(Algeria) ASE Alger Centre

Manouba Stadium, Tunis

18 August 2007
--:--

Tunisair Club (Tunisia)	1–5	(Morocco) FC Berrechid

Stade El Menzah, Tunis
18 August 2007
--:--

ASE Alger Centre (Algeria)	2–1	(Egypt) Wadi Degla

Stade El Menzah, Tunis
