= 2008 UNAF Women's Club Tournament =

دورة إتحاد شمال إفريقيا للأندية للسيدات 2008

Tournament details
- Host country: Algeria
- City: Algiers
- Dates: 26 June–4 July
- Teams: 3 (from UNAF confederations)
- Venue: 2 (in 1 host city)

Final positions
- Champions: (Algeria) ASE Alger Centre (1st title)
- Runners-up: (Tunisia) CS ISSEPC Kef

Tournament statistics
- Matches played: 3
- Goals scored: 10 (3.33 per match)

The 2008 UNAF Women's Club Tournament is the 2nd edition of the UNAF Women's Club Tournament. The clubs from Algeria, Egypt and Tunisia faced off for the title. The Algerian team ASE Alger Centre wins the tournament.

== Teams ==
Wadi Degla was chosen by the Egyptian Football Association as an Egyptian representative, the Egyptian Women's Premier League was cancelled since the 2002–03 season.

Association	Team	Qualifying method
Algeria	ASE Alger Centre	2006–07 Algerian Women's Championship champions
Egypt	Wadi Degla	Egyptian representative
Tunisia	CS ISSEPC Kef	2006–07 Tunisian Women's Championship champions
Libya	No representative team	
Morocco	FC Berrechid	2006–07 Moroccan Women's Championship runners-up & holders but withdrew

== Tournament ==
The competition played in a round-robin tournament determined the final standings. It's hosted in Algiers, Algeria.

Pos	Team	Pld	W	D	L	GF	GA	GD	Pts	Qualification
1	(Algeria) ASE Alger Centre (H)	2	1	1	0	4	2	+2	4	Champions
2	(Tunisia) CS ISSEPC Kef	2	1	0	1	3	3	0	3	
3	(Egypt) Wadi Degla	2	0	1	1	3	5	−2	1	

Source: aseac
(H) Hosts
28 June 2008
--:--

CS ISSEPC Kef (Tunisia)	3–1	(Egypt) Wadi Degla

Ali Benfedda Stadium, Zéralda

30 June 2008
18:00

ASE Alger Centre (Algeria)	2–2	(Egypt) Wadi Degla

Ali Benfedda Stadium, Zéralda

2 July 2008
--:--

ASE Alger Centre (Algeria)	2–0	(Tunisia) CS ISSEPC Kef
Marek 48', 77'

20 August Stadium, Algiers
Referee: ? (Egypt)
