= 2020–21 Tunisian Women's Championship =

Tunisian Women's Championship
- Season: 2020–21
- Champions: ASF Sousse
- All statistics correct as of 6 December 2021.

The 2020–21 Tunisian Women's Championship was the 15th season of the Tunisian Women's Championship, the Tunisian national women's association football competition. AS Banque de l'Habitat are the defending champions.

== Group stage ==
=== Group A ===
Pos	Team	Pld	W	D	L	GF	GA	GD	Pts	Qualification or relegation
1	ASF Sousse	6	6	0	0	23	2	+21	18	Knockout stage
2	AS Banque de l'Habitat	6	5	0	1	15	5	+10	15	Knockout stage
3	ASF Sahel	6	3	1	2	5	6	−1	10	
4	ASF Sbiba	6	2	1	3	15	17	−2	7	
5	ASF Bouhajla	6	2	0	4	5	13	−8	6	
6	US Tunisienne	6	1	2	3	9	11	−2	5	
7	ASF Sbeitla	6	0	0	6	2	20	−18	0	Relegated

Updated to match(es) played on 27 July 2021. Source: rsssf
Rules for classification: 1) Points; 2) Goal difference; 3) Number of goals scored

=== Group B ===
Pos	Team	Pld	W	D	L	GF	GA	GD	Pts	Qualification or relegation
1	ASF Gafsa	6	6	0	0	39	0	+39	18	Knockout stage
2	ASF Medenine	6	4	0	2	15	8	+7	12	Knockout stage
3	TS Gafsa	6	4	0	2	25	4	+21	12	
4	MS Sidi Bouzid	6	3	1	2	10	11	−1	10	
5	AS Feriana	6	2	1	3	13	31	−18	7	
6	PSF Sfax	6	1	0	5	5	27	−22	3	
7	ES Tataouine	6	0	0	6	5	31	−26	0	Relegated

Updated to match(es) played on 27 July 2021. Source: rsssf
Rules for classification: 1) Points; 2) Goal difference; 3) Number of goals scored

== Knockout stage ==
=== Bracket ===
Semi-finals
27 Jun ,-
ASF Gafsa	0
AS Banque de l'Habitat	4
27 Jun ,-
ASF Sousse	24
ASF Medenine	0

Final
5 December ,-
ASF Sousse	3
AS Banque de l'Habitat	2
