= 2008–09 Algerian Women's Championship =

Algerian Women's Championship
- Season: 2008–09
- Champions: ASE Alger Centre

The 2008–09 Algerian Women's Championship was the tenth season of the Algerian Women's Championship, the Algerian national women's association football competition. It was also the first one under its new national format. ASE Alger Centre won the championship for the seventh consecutive time and for the heith time of its history.

== Teams ==
- ASE Alger Centre
- CLT Belouizdad
- FC Béjaïa
- JF Khroub
- AS Intissar Oran
- Afak Relizane
- JF Sétif
- ARTSF Tébessa
- COS Tiaret
- ESFOR Touggourt

== Results ==
Pos	Team	Pld	W	D	L	F	A	GD	Pts	Notes
1	ASE Alger Centre	18							47	Champions
2	Afak Relizane	18							47	
3	AS Intissar Oran	18							36	
4	CLT Belouizdad	18							33	
5	JF Khroub	18							27	
6	FC Béjaïa	18							26	
7	COTS Tiaret	18							23	
8	ARTSF Tébessa	18							8	
9	ESFOR Touggourt	18							7	Relegation to 2009–10 W-Championship D2
10	JF Sétif	18							5	Relegation to 2009–10 W-Championship D2
