= 2016–17 Algerian Women's League Cup =

Women's League Cup

Tournament details
- Country: Algeria
- Teams: 15

Final positions
- Champions: ASE Alger Centre (1st title)
- Runners-up: AS Sûreté Nationale

Tournament statistics
- Matches played: 27
- Goals scored: 97 (3.59 per match)

The 2016–17 Algerian Women's League Cup is the 1st season of the Algerian Women's League Cup. The competition is open to all Algerian Women's clubs participating in the Algerian Women's Championship. ASE Alger Centre wins the cup beating AS Sûreté Nationale in the final match played in Ahmed Zabana Stadium, Oran.

== Tournament ==
=== Round of 16 ===
Team 1	Agg.	Team 2	1st leg	2nd leg
JF Khroub	10–2	COTS Tiaret	4–0	6–2
ESFOR Touggourt	3–3 (a)	AFW Oum Bouaghi	2–2	1–1
FC Béjaïa	1–2	AS Oran Centre	0–1	1–1
ARTSF Tébessa	2–5	MZ Biskra	2–2	0–3
CF Akbou	1–7	ASE Alger Centre	1–5	0–2
SF El Attaf	1–11	Afak Relizane	0–2	1–9
AS Sûreté Nationale	12–2	AS Intissar Oran	4–2	8–0
FC Constantine	Bye			

=== Quarter-finals ===
Team 1	Agg.	Team 2	1st leg	2nd leg
JF Khroub	0–2	ASE Alger Centre	0–2	0–0
AFW Oum Bouaghi	1–10	MZ Biskra	1–4	0–6
AS Oran Centre	0–11	Afak Relizane	0–4	0–7
AS Sûreté Nationale	1–1 (a)	FC Constantine	0–0	1–1

=== Semi-finals ===
Team 1	Agg.	Team 2	1st leg	2nd leg
ASE Alger Centre	1–2	MZ Biskra	1–0	1–1
AS Sûreté Nationale	2–2 (a)	Afak Relizane	1–0	1–2

=== Final ===
Team 1	Score	Team 2
ASE Alger Centre	1–1 (4–3 p)	AS Sûreté Nationale

8 March 2017
16:00

ASE Alger Centre	1−1	AS Sûreté Nationale
Marek 7'		Chaouche 59' (pen.)
Penalties
	4−3

Ahmed Zabana Stadium, Oran
Referee: Nabil Boukhalfa
