= 2024 UNAF U-20 Women's Club Tournament =

دورة إتحاد شمال إفريقيا للأندية للسيدات تحت 20 سنة 2024

Tournament details
- Host country: Tunisia
- City: Tunis
- Dates: 6–14 September
- Teams: 5 (from UNAF confederations)
- Venue(s): 2 (in 1 host city)

Final positions
- Champions: (Algeria) Afak Relizane (1st title)
- Runners-up: (Tunisia) ASF Sousse

Tournament statistics
- Matches played: 10
- Goals scored: 30 (3 per match)
- Top scorer(s): (Algeria) Siham Azzouz (6 goals)

The 2024 UNAF U-20 Women's Club Tournament is the 1st edition of the UNAF U-20 Women's Club Tournament, it's held between 6 and 14 September 2024 in Ariana and Le Kram, two suburbs from Tunis. The clubs of under 20 from Algeria, Egypt and Tunisia faced off for the title.

== Teams ==
| Association | Team | Qualifying method |
|---|---|---|
| Algeria | Afak Relizane | 2023–24 Algerian U-20 Women's Championship champions |
| Algeria | CF Akbou | 2023–24 Algerian U-20 Women's Cup runners-up |
| Egypt | Pyramids FC | 2023–24 Egyptian U-20 Women's Premier League champions |
| Tunisia | ASF Sousse | 2023–24 Tunisian U-20 Women's Championship champions |
| Tunisia | US Tunisienne | 2023–24 Tunisian U-20 Women's Championship runners-up |
| Libya | No representative teams | |
| Morocco | No representative teams | |

== Venues ==
| Cities | Venues | Capacity |
|---|---|---|
| Ariana (Tunis) | Ariana Stadium | 7,000 |
| Le Kram (Tunis) | El Kram Stadium | 5,000 |

== Tournament ==
The competition played in a round-robin tournament determined the final standings. It's hosted in Tunis, Tunisia.
All times are local, WAT (UTC+1).

| Pos | Team | Pld | W | D | L | GF | GA | GD | Pts | Qualification |
|---|---|---|---|---|---|---|---|---|---|---|
| 1 | (Algeria) Afak Relizane | 4 | 4 | 0 | 0 | 17 | 0 | +17 | 12 | Champions |
| 2 | (Tunisia) ASF Sousse (H) | 4 | 1 | 2 | 1 | 4 | 4 | 0 | 5 | |
| 3 | (Algeria) CF Akbou | 4 | 1 | 2 | 1 | 3 | 3 | 0 | 5 | |
| 4 | (Egypt) Pyramids FC | 4 | 1 | 1 | 2 | 4 | 6 | −2 | 4 | |
| 5 | (Tunisia) US Tunisienne | 4 | 0 | 1 | 3 | 2 | 17 | −15 | 1 | |

(H) Hosts
6 September 2024
14:30

| ASF Sousse (Tunisia) | 1–1 | (Algeria) CF Akbou |
|---|---|---|
| Aya Majri 78' | Report | Wafa Hamri 39' (pen.) |

El Kram Stadium, Le Kram (Tunis)
Referee: Aya Mohamed (Egypt)
6 September 2024
14:30

| Afak Relizane (Algeria) | 11–0 | (Tunisia) US Tunisienne |
|---|---|---|
| Azzouz 3', 37', 40+2', 50'; Sehoul 39'; Rebbahi 40+3', 75'; Beldjilali 40+4', 47', 54'; Nezha 80+5' | Report |

Ariana Stadium, Ariana (Tunis)
Referee: Nouhaila Belkhoukh (Morocco)

8 September 2024
14:30

| Afak Relizane (Algeria) | 1–0 | (Algeria) CF Akbou |
|---|---|---|
| Belkhodja 20' | Report (FAF); Report (UNAF) |

El Kram Stadium, Le Kram (Tunis)
Referee: Aya Mohamed (Egypt)
8 September 2024
14:30

| US Tunisienne (Tunisia) | 1–3 | (Egypt) Pyramids FC |
|---|---|---|
| Salsabil Afana 77' (pen.) | Report | Khadeeja Ahmed 7'; Malak Omar 21'; Hanaa Khaled 42' |

Ariana Stadium, Ariana (Tunis)
Referee: Dhikra Houia (Algeria)

10 September 2024
14:30

| ASF Sousse (Tunisia) | 2–0 | (Tunisia) US Tunisienne |
|---|---|---|
| Aya Majri 66'; Farah Kafraj 68' | Report |

El Kram Stadium, Le Kram (Tunis)
Referee: Dhikra Houia (Algeria)
10 September 2024
14:30

| Afak Relizane (Algeria) | 3–0 | (Egypt) Pyramids FC |
|---|---|---|
| Belkhodja 25', 78'; Sehoul 52' | Report (FAF); Report (UNAF) |

Ariana Stadium, Ariana (Tunis)
Referee: Houna Jebali (Tunisia)

12 September 2024
14:30

| CF Akbou (Algeria) | 1–0 | (Egypt) Pyramids FC |
|---|---|---|
| Wafa Hamri 12' |

El Kram Stadium, Le Kram (Tunis)
Referee: Mayssa Ben Njima (Tunisia)
12 September 2024
16:00

| Afak Relizane (Algeria) | 2–0 | (Tunisia) ASF Sousse |
|---|---|---|
| Siham Azzouz 13', 56' |

El Kram Stadium, Le Kram (Tunis)
Referee: Nouhaila Belkhoukh (Morocco)

14 September 2024
14:30

| US Tunisienne (Tunisia) | 1–1 | (Algeria) CF Akbou |
|---|---|---|
| Amel Matoussi 64' | | Yasmine Tizaoui 13' |

El Kram Stadium, Le Kram (Tunis)
Referee: Aya Mohamed (Egypt)
14 September 2024
16:00

| Pyramids FC (Egypt) | 1–1 | (Tunisia) ASF Sousse |
|---|---|---|
| Farah Mahmoud 40' | | Aya Majri 78' |

El Kram Stadium, Le Kram (Tunis)
Referee: Nouhaila Belkhoukh (Morocco)

== Statistics ==
=== Goalscorers ===
There have been 30 goals scored in 10 matches, for an average of 3 goals per match.

| Rank | Player | Team | Goals |
|---|---|---|---|
| 1 | (Algeria) Siham Azzouz | (Algeria) Afak Relizane | 6 |
| 2 | (Algeria) Sara Beldjilali | (Algeria) Afak Relizane | 3 |
| 2 | (Tunisia) Aya Majri | (Tunisia) ASF Sousse | 3 |
| 4 | (Algeria) Nada Belkhoudja | (Algeria) Afak Relizane | 2 |
| 4 | (Algeria) Zohra Rebbahi | (Algeria) Afak Relizane | 2 |
| 4 | (Algeria) Hanane Sehoul | (Algeria) Afak Relizane | 2 |
| 4 | (Algeria) Wafa Hamri | (Algeria) CF Akbou | 2 |
| 8 | (Algeria) Nour El Houda Nezha | (Algeria) Afak Relizane | 1 |
| 8 | (Algeria) Yasmine Tizaoui | (Algeria) CF Akbou | 1 |
| 8 | (Egypt) Khadeeja Ahmed | (Egypt) Pyramids FC | 1 |
| 8 | (Egypt) Hanaa Khaled | (Egypt) Pyramids FC | 1 |
| 8 | (Egypt) Farah Mahmoud | (Egypt) Pyramids FC | 1 |
| 8 | (Egypt) Malak Omar | (Egypt) Pyramids FC | 1 |
| 8 | (Tunisia) Farah Kafraj | (Tunisia) ASF Sousse | 1 |
| 8 | (Tunisia) Salsabil Afana | (Tunisia) US Tunisienne | 1 |
| 8 | (Tunisia) Amel Matoussi | (Tunisia) US Tunisienne | 1 |

== Awards ==
- Goalscorer: (Algeria) Siham Azzouz (Afak Relizane) (6 goals)
- Fairplay team: (Algeria) Afak Relizane

== Broadcasting rights ==
| Territory | Broadcaster | Ref. |
|---|---|---|
| North Africa | UNAF YouTube Channel | |
