= 2018–19 Algerian Women's Championship =

Algerian Women's Championship
- Season: 2018–19
- Champions: AS Sureté Nationale
- Matches played: 132
- Goals scored: 490 (3.71 per match)
- Biggest home win: ASE Alger Centre 12–0 SMB Touggourt
- Biggest away win: ESFOR Touggourt 0–11 AS Sureté Nationale
- Highest scoring: ASE Alger Centre 12–0 SMB Touggourt
- Longest winning run: 10 wins (Afak Relizane)
- Longest unbeaten run: 12 games (AS Sureté Nationale)
- Longest winless run: 22 games (SMB Touggourt)
- Longest losing run: 22 losses (SMB Touggourt)
- All statistics correct as of 14 December 2019.

The 2018–19 Algerian Women's Championship was the 21st season of the Algerian Women's Championship, the Algerian national women's association football competition. AS Sureté Nationale won the competition after a close battle with Afak Relizane, winning the league by one point after a final day victory against ASE Alger Centre. SMB Touggourt finished bottom of the league after failing to gain a single point, losing all 22 of their fixtures with a goal difference of -129.

In previous seasons, the league season had been split up into East and West sections, with the top six teams qualifying for a final championship round to determine the overall league champion. The 2018-19 season introduced a new, more straight-forward double round-robin, with the winner being the team with the most points after the 22 game season.

== Clubs ==
Team	City
Afak Relizane	Relizane
ASE Alger Centre	Algiers
AS Sureté Nationale	Algiers
CF Akbou	Ouzellaguen
ESF Amizour	Amizour
ESFOR Touggourt	Touggourt
FC Béjaia	Béjaïa
FC Constantine	Constantine
AS Intissar Oran	Oran
JF Khroub	El Khroub
MZ Biskra	Biskra
SMB Touggourt	Touggourt

== Standings ==
Pos	Team	Pld	W	D	L	GF	GA	GD	Pts	Qualification or relegation	SUR	AFF	FCC	ALC	JFK	CFA	AMI	MZB	FCB	INT	TOU	SMB
1	AS Sûreté Nationale	22	18	3	1	76	9	+67	57	Champions	—	1–0	1–1	0–0	1–0	2–1	3–0	2–0	7–0	6–1	11–0	9–0
2	Afak Relizane	22	18	2	2	45	9	+36	56		0–1	—	1–0	1–0	2–0	3–0	4–0	1–0	0–0	3–0	6–1	3–0
3	FC Constantine	22	15	3	4	60	15	+45	48		0–1	0–2	—	3–1	4–1	0–1	3–0	4–1	3–0	5–0	7–1	10–0
4	ASE Alger Centre	22	11	4	7	51	15	+36	37		0–1	1–2	0–2	—	0–0	1–1	1–0	3–0	2–0	4–0	3–0	12–0
5	JF Khroub	22	11	3	8	47	18	+29	36		0–1	1–3	1–2	0–2	—	1–0	2–0	1–1	3–0	3–0	7–0	6–0
6	CF Akbou	22	9	4	9	48	24	+24	31		0–1	0–1	1–1	2–1	0–3	—	4–1	1–0	0–2	4–0	9–1	8–1
7	ESF Amizour	22	9	4	9	34	32	+2	31		0–1	1–1	2–4	1–1	0–2	1–0	—	3–0	1–0	4–0	3–1	4–1
8	MZ Biskra	22	9	3	10	41	29	+12	30		0–0	0–1	0–2	0–2	2–1	1–0	1–1	—	2–0	5–1	6–1	4–0
9	FC Béjaïa	22	8	5	9	36	28	+8	29		0–5	1–2	0–2	1–0	0–0	1–1	2–2	0–1	—	3–1	2–0	7–0
10	AS Intissar Oran	22	4	3	15	32	74	−42	15		0–7	2–4	0–3	0–5	0–8	1–1	2–3	1–4	1–1	—	4–1	8–1
11	ESFOR Touggourt	22	2	2	18	14	102	−88	8	Relegated	0–11	0–2	0–0	0–5	0–3	0–8	0–4	0–7	0–1	2–2	—	3–0
12	SMB Touggourt	22	0	0	22	6	135	−129	0	Relegated	1–8	0–5	0–3	0–7	0–4	1–9	0–3	0–9	0–10	1–5	0–2	—

Updated to match(es) played on 4 October 2019. Source: goalzz.com
Rules for classification: 1) Points; 2) Goal difference; 3) Number of goals scored
