= 2017–18 Algerian Women's Championship =

Algerian Women's Championship
- Season: 2017–18
- Champions: FC Constantine
- Matches played: 152
- Goals scored: 595 (3.91 per match)
- All statistics correct as of 25 November 2019.

The 2017–18 Algerian Women's Championship was the 20th season of the Algerian Women's Championship, the Algerian national women's association football competition. FC Constantine won the competition after a close battle with AS Sureté Nationale in both the East Central Group and the Championship Round.

== Results ==
=== Groups ===
==== Group East Central ====
Pos	Team	Pld	W	D	L	GF	GA	GD	Pts	Qualification
1	FC Constantine	14	12	1	1	86	5	+81	37	Qualification to Championship Round
2	AS Sûreté Nationale	14	12	1	1	73	9	+64	37	Qualification to Championship Round
3	JF Khroub	14	7	5	2	40	5	+35	26	Qualification to Championship Round
4	MZ Biskra	14	8	2	4	43	12	+31	26	Qualification to Championship Round
5	FJ Skikda	14	3	3	8	19	59	−40	12	
6	ARTSF Tébessa	14	2	3	9	10	53	−43	9	
7	ESFOR Touggourt	14	2	1	11	7	65	−58	7	
8	AC Biskra	14	1	2	11	5	75	−70	5	

Updated to match(es) played on 24 November 2019. Source:
Rules for classification: 1) points; 2) goal difference; 3) number of goals scored.

==== Group West Central ====
Pos	Team	Pld	W	D	L	GF	GA	GD	Pts	Qualification
1	ASE Alger Centre	14	11	3	0	50	3	+47	36	Qualification to Championship Round
2	Affak Relizane	14	11	2	1	28	8	+20	35	Qualification to Championship Round
3	CF Akbou	14	9	2	3	44	12	+32	29	Qualification to Championship Round
4	AS Intissar Oran	14	5	4	5	28	15	+13	19	Qualification to Championship Round
5	AS Oran Centre	14	2	6	6	9	25	−16	12	
6	FC Béjaïa	14	2	5	7	11	22	−11	11	
7	ESF Amizour	14	2	3	9	11	47	−36	9	
8	COS Tiaret	14	1	1	12	7	56	−49	4	

Updated to match(es) played on 24 November 2019. Source:
Rules for classification: 1) points; 2) goal difference; 3) number of goals scored.

=== Play Down ===
==== Play Down East Central ====
Pos	Team	Pld	W	D	L	GF	GA	GD	Pts	Relegation
1	ESFOR Touggourt	3	2	0	1	5	4	+1	6	
2	ARTSF Tébessa	3	1	2	0	3	2	+1	5	
3	AC Biskra	3	0	2	1	3	4	−1	2	
4	FJ Skikda	3	0	2	1	2	3	−1	2	Relegation

Updated to match(es) played on 25 November 2019. Source:
Rules for classification: 1) points; 2) goal difference; 3) number of goals scored.

==== Play Down West Central ====
Pos	Team	Pld	W	D	L	GF	GA	GD	Pts	Relegation
1	FC Béjaïa	3	3	0	0	9	1	+8	9	
2	ESF Amizour	3	2	0	1	4	2	+2	6	
3	AS Oran Centre	3	1	0	2	3	3	0	3	
4	COS Tiaret	3	0	2	1	2	12	−10	2	Relegation

Updated to match(es) played on 25 November 2019. Source:
Rules for classification: 1) points; 2) goal difference; 3) number of goals scored.

=== Championship Round ===
Pos	Team	Pld	W	D	L	GF	GA	GD	Pts	Qualification
1	FC Constantine	7	6	1	0	21	4	+17	19	Champion
2	AS Sûreté Nationale	7	6	0	1	20	3	+17	18	
3	MZ Biskra	7	4	1	2	15	11	+4	13	
4	JF Khroub	7	2	3	2	6	9	−3	9	
5	ASE Alger Centre	7	2	2	3	18	12	+6	8	
6	CF Akbou	7	2	1	4	8	20	−12	7	
7	Affak Relizane	7	1	2	4	3	9	−6	5	
8	AS Intissar Oran	7	0	0	7	2	25	−23	0	

Updated to match(es) played on 25 November 2019. Source:
Rules for classification: 1) points; 2) goal difference; 3) number of goals scored.
