= 2021 CAF Women's Champions League UNAF Qualifiers =

تصفيات إتحاد شمال إفريقيا المؤهلة لدوري أبطال إفريقيا للسيدات 2021
- Official logo of the tournament

Tournament details
- Host country: Morocco
- City: Berkane
- Dates: 24–30 July
- Teams: 3 (from 3 associations)

Final positions
- Champions: (Morocco) AS FAR (1st title)
- Runners-up: (Algeria) Afak Relizane
- Third place: (Tunisia) AS Banque de l'Habitat

Tournament statistics
- Matches played: 3
- Goals scored: 19 (6.33 per match)
- Top scorer(s): (Morocco) Ibtissam Jraidi (6 goals)

The 2021 CAF Women's Champions League UNAF Qualifiers is the 1st edition of the UNAF women's club football qualifier tournament organised by the UNAF for the women's clubs of association nations. This edition was held from 24 to 30 July 2021 in Berkane, Morocco. The winners of the tournament qualified for the 2021 CAF Women's Champions League final tournament held in Egypt. The tournament was won by AS FAR of Morocco.

== Participating teams ==
The following three teams contested in the qualifying tournament. Wadi Degla SC from Egypt is the 2021 Egyptian League champions and he qualified automatically as the hosts of the final tournament. Due to the COVID-19 pandemic in Morocco, all the matches were played behind closed doors without any spectators.

Team	Qualifying method	Appearances	Previous best performance
(Algeria) Afak Relizane	2020–21 Algerian Women's champions	1st	n/a
(Morocco) AS FAR	2020–21 Moroccan Women's champions	1st	n/a
(Tunisia) AS Banque de l'Habitat	2020–21 Tunisian Women's champions	1st	n/a

== Venues ==
Cities	Venues	Capacity
Berkane	Stade Municipal de Berkane	10,000

== Match officials ==
The following referees were chosen for the tournament.

=== Referees ===
- (Algeria) Lamia Athmane
- (Egypt) Shahanda Saad Al-Maghraby
- (Morocco) Fatima Zahra El-Ajjani
- (Morocco) Sabah Sadir
- (Tunisia) Dorsaf Ganouati

=== Assistant referees ===
- (Algeria) Feriel Isma Ouahab
- (Egypt) Yara Atef
- (Morocco) Soukaina Hamdi
- (Morocco) Fatiha Jermoumi
- (Tunisia) Houda Affine
- (Tunisia) Rahma Alouini

== Qualifying tournament ==
Pos	Team	Pld	W	D	L	GF	GA	GD	Pts	Qualification
1	(Morocco) AS FAR (H)	2	2	0	0	14	1	+13	6	Final tournament
2	(Algeria) Afak Relizane	2	1	0	1	4	5	−1	3	
3	(Tunisia) AS Banque de l'Habitat	2	0	0	2	1	13	−12	0	

(H) Hosts
24 July 2021
17:00

Afak Relizane (Algeria)	3–1	(Tunisia) AS Banque de l'Habitat
Hamidèche 41'; Kandouci 61'; Bouhenni 85'	Report (UNAF)	Ben Mohamed 45'

Stade Municipal de Berkane, Berkane
Attendance: 0 (close doors)
Referee: Sabah Sadir (Morocco)

27 July 2021
17:00

AS FAR (Morocco)	4–1	(Algeria) Afak Relizane
Chebbak 16'; Jraidi 35', 37', 89'	Report (UNAF)	Bouhenni 45' (pen.)

Stade Municipal de Berkane, Berkane
Attendance: 0 (close doors)
Referee: Dorsaf Ganouati (Tunisia)

30 July 2021
18:00

AS Banque de l'Habitat (Tunisia)	0–10	(Morocco) AS FAR
	Report (UNAF)	Jraidi 14', 43', 59'; Tagnaout 24'; Moudni 30'; Chebbak 45' (pen.); Aït El Haj 54' (pen.); Yaakoubi 56' (o.g.); Badri 65'; Jbilou 77' (pen.)

Stade Municipal de Berkane, Berkane
Attendance: 0 (close doors)
Referee: Shahanda Saad Al-Maghraby (Egypt)

== Statistics ==
=== Goalscorers ===
As of 30 July 2021

Rank	Player	Team	Goals
1	(Morocco) Ibtissam Jraidi	(Morocco) AS FAR	6
2	(Algeria) Naïma Bouhenni	(Algeria) Afak Relizane	2
2	(Morocco) Ghizlane Chebbak	(Morocco) AS FAR	2
4	(Algeria) Aïcha Hamidèche	(Algeria) Afak Relizane	1
4	(Algeria) Zeyneb Kandouci	(Algeria) Afak Relizane	1
4	(Morocco) Hanane Aït El Haj	(Morocco) AS FAR	1
4	(Morocco) Najat Badri	(Morocco) AS FAR	1
4	(Morocco) Hajar Jbilou	(Morocco) AS FAR	1
4	(Morocco) Nora Moudni	(Morocco) AS FAR	1
4	(Morocco) Fatima Tagnaout	(Morocco) AS FAR	1
4	(Tunisia) Chaima Ben Mohamed	(Tunisia) AS Banque de l'Habitat	1

Own goals

- (Tunisia) Sana Yaakoubi (AS Banque de l'Habitat vs AS FAR)
