= 2021–22 Tunisian Women's Championship =

16th season of the Tunisian Women's Championship sport football

Tunisian Women's Championship
- Season: 2021–22
- Champions: AS Banque de l'Habitat
- All statistics correct as of 22 May 2022.

The 2021–22 Tunisian Women's Championship is the 16th season of the Tunisian Women's Championship, the Tunisian national women's association football competition. ASF Sousse are the defending champions.

== Clubs ==
=== North Group ===
- AS Banque de l'Habitat
- ASF Sousse
- ASF Sahel
- US Tunisienne
- ASF Sbiba
- ASF Bou Hajla

=== South Group ===
- ASF Gafsa
- ASF Medenine
- MS Sidi Bouzid
- ASF Sbeitla
- PSF Sfax
- ES Tataouine

== Group stage ==
=== Group A ===
Pos	Team	Pld	W	D	L	GF	GA	GD	Pts	Qualification or relegation
1	AS Banque de l'Habitat	8	7	1	0	39	5	+34	22	Knockout stage
2	ASF Sahel	8	4	3	1	19	8	+11	15	Knockout stage
3	ASF Sousse	8	4	1	3	23	16	+7	13	
4	US Tunisienne	8	3	0	5	12	20	−8	9	
5	ASF Bouhajla	8	2	1	5	7	15	−8	7	
6	ASF Sbiba	8	0	2	6	1	27	−26	2	Relegated

Updated to match(es) played on 6 January 2022 Day 4. Source:
Rules for classification: 1) Points; 2) Goal difference; 3) Number of goals scored

==== Results ====
Home \ Away	ASFSO	ASBH	ASFSA	ASFSB	ASFB	UST
ASF Sousse		1–3	3–5	2–0		5–1
AS Banque de l'Habitat	5–1			6–0	4–0	4–0
ASF Sahel	1–1	2–2		8–0		0–2
ASF Sbiba	0–11	1–4	0–0		0–4	
ASF Bouhajla	1–2	1–4	0–2	0–0		
US Tunisienne	0–7		0–1	6–1	3–0	

Updated to match(es) played on 25 November 2021. Source: Tunisian Football Federation
Legend: Blue = home team win; Yellow = draw; Red = away team win.
For upcoming matches, an "a" indicates there is an article about the rivalry between the two participants.

=== Group B ===
Pos	Team	Pld	W	D	L	GF	GA	GD	Pts	Qualification or relegation
1	ES Tataouine	7	5	1	1	17	6	+11	16	Knockout stage
2	ASF Medenine	8	6	0	2	22	7	+15	18	Knockout stage
3	MS Sidi Bouzid	7	5	2	0	21	3	+18	17	
4	PSF Sfax	8	2	0	6	7	21	−14	6	
5	ASF Sbeitla	8	1	2	5	6	14	−8	5	
6	ASF Gafsa	8	1	1	6	3	24	−21	4	Relegated

Updated to match(es) played on 6 February 2022. Source:
Rules for classification: 1) Points; 2) Goal difference; 3) Number of goals scored

==== Results ====
Home \ Away	ASFGA	ASFME	MSSB	PSFSF	ASFSB	ESTA
ASF Gafsa		0–2	0–1	3–2	0–0	0–4
ASF Medenine	3–0		1–3	6–1	4–1	1–0
MS Sidi Bouzid	10–0			2–0 *	3–0	3–0
PSF Sfax	2–0	0–3			1–0	
ASF Sbeitla			1–1	3–0		1–2
ES Tataouine		3–2	1–1	4–1	3–0	

Updated to match(es) played on 25 November 2021. Source: Tunisian Football Federation
Legend: Blue = home team win; Yellow = draw; Red = away team win.
For upcoming matches, an "a" indicates there is an article about the rivalry between the two participants.

== Play Off ==
Pos	Team	Pld	W	D	L	GF	GA	GD	Pts	Qualification or relegation
1	AS Banque de l'Habitat	2	2	0	0	5	0	+5	6	Winner
2	MS Sidi Bouzid	2	1	0	1	3	2	+1	3	
3	ASF Sahel	2	1	0	1	1	3	−2	3	
4	ES Tataouine	2	0	0	2	1	5	−4	0	

Updated to match(es) played on 6 January 2022 Day 4. Source:
Rules for classification: 1) Points; 2) Goal difference; 3) Number of goals scored
- 1st 15 May 2022
- AS Banque de l'Habitat 3-0 ASF Sahel
- MS Sidi Bouzid 3-1 ES Tataouine
- 2nd 18 MAy 2022
- AS Banque de l'Habitat 2-0 ES Tataouine
- MS Sidi Bouzid 0-1 ASF Sahel
- 3rd:22 May 2022
- AS Banque de l'Habitat MS Sidi Bouzid
- ASF Sahel ES Tataouine
