= Habiba Sadou =

Algerian footballer (born 1986)

Personal information
- Date of birth: 1 November 1986 (age 39)
- Position: Defender

Team information
- Current team: Afak Relizane
- Number: 24

Senior career*
Years	Team	Apps	(Gls)
–	ASE Alger Centre	-	(-)
–	Afak Relizane	-	(-)

International career^{‡}
2010–	Algeria	2	(0)
- * Club domestic league appearances and goals ‡ National team caps and goals as of 20 June 2019

Habiba Sadou (Arabic: حبيبة سعدو; born 1 November 1986) is an Algerian international footballer who plays as a defender for Afak Relizane and for the Algeria women's national football team. She competed for Algeria at the 2018 Africa Women Cup of Nations, playing in two matches.
