= Soumaya Laamiri =

Tunisian footballer

Personal information
- Date of birth: 8 September 1995 (age 31)
- Position: Midfielder

Team information
- Current team: AS Banque de l'Habitat

Senior career*
Years	Team	Apps	(Gls)
- AS Banque de l'Habitat

International career
- Tunisia
- * Club domestic league appearances and goals

Soumaya Laamiri (Arabic: سمية العميري, born 8 September 1995) is a Tunisian footballer who plays as a midfielder for AS Banque de l'Habitat and the Tunisia women's national team.

== Club career ==
Laamiri has played for AS Banque de l'Habitat in Tunisia.

== International career ==
Laamiri capped for Tunisia at senior level during 2016 Africa Women Cup of Nations qualification.

=== International goals ===
Scores and results list Tunisia's goal tally first

No.	Date	Venue	Opponent	Score	Result	Competition	Ref.
1	16 February 2020	El Kram Stadium, El Kram , Tunisia	Mauritania	1	3–0	2020 UNAF Women's Tournament	
2	28 November 2021	Ariana Stadium, Ariana, Tunisia	Algeria	1	2-4	Friendly	

== Personal life ==
Laamiri is Muslim, wearing hijab even during her international football matches.

== See also ==
- List of Tunisia women's international footballers
