= 2020–21 Algerian Women's Championship =

Algerian Women's Championship
- Season: 2020–21
- Champions: Afak Relizane
- All statistics correct as of 26 August 2021.

The 2020–21 Algerian Women's Championship was the 23rd season of the Algerian Women's Championship, the Algerian national women's association football competition. Afak Relizane won the competition for the ninth time. For the first time, the champions partiticipate to the first 2021 CAF Women's Champions League.

== Clubs ==
| Team | City |
|---|---|
| ASE Alger Centre | Algiers |
| AS Sureté Nationale | Algiers |
| ESF Amizour | Amizour |
| FC Béjaia | Béjaïa |
| MZ 2000 Biskra | Biskra |
| FC Constantine | Constantine |
| JF Khroub | El Khroub |
| AR Guelma | Guelma |
| AS Intissar Oran | Oran |
| AS Oran Centre | Oran |
| CF Akbou | Ouzellaguen |
| Afak Relizane | Relizane |

== Group stage ==
=== Centre-West Group ===
| Pos | Team | Pld | W | D | L | GF | GA | GD | Pts | Qualification or relegation |
|---|---|---|---|---|---|---|---|---|---|---|
| 1 | Afak Relizane | 10 | 8 | 2 | 0 | 36 | 7 | +29 | 26 | Play-off stage |
| 2 | AS Sûreté Nationale | 10 | 7 | 1 | 2 | 41 | 9 | +32 | 22 | Play-off stage |
| 3 | ASE Alger Centre | 10 | 5 | 4 | 1 | 40 | 11 | +29 | 19 | Play-off stage |
| 4 | ESF Amizour | 10 | 4 | 1 | 5 | 15 | 22 | −7 | 13 | Play-down stage |
| 5 | AS Intissar Oran | 10 | 2 | 0 | 8 | 7 | 35 | −28 | 6 | Play-down stage |
| 6 | AS Oran Centre | 10 | 0 | 0 | 10 | 5 | 60 | −55 | 0 | Play-down stage |

Updated to match(es) played on 26 August 2021. Source: liberté
Rules for classification: 1) Points; 2) Goal difference; 3) Number of goals scored

=== Centre-East Group ===
| Pos | Team | Pld | W | D | L | GF | GA | GD | Pts | Qualification or relegation |
|---|---|---|---|---|---|---|---|---|---|---|
| 1 | CF Akbou | 10 | 7 | 2 | 1 | 43 | 7 | +36 | 23 | Play-off stage |
| 2 | FC Constantine | 10 | 7 | 1 | 2 | 33 | 4 | +29 | 22 | Play-off stage |
| 3 | JF Khroub | 10 | 7 | 1 | 2 | 32 | 5 | +27 | 22 | Play-off stage |
| 4 | MZ Biskra | 10 | 4 | 0 | 6 | 14 | 27 | −13 | 12 | Play-down stage |
| 5 | FC Béjaïa | 10 | 1 | 3 | 6 | 3 | 13 | −10 | 6 | Play-down stage |
| 6 | AR Guelma | 10 | 0 | 1 | 9 | 2 | 71 | −69 | 1 | Play-down stage |

Updated to match(es) played on 26 August 2021. Source: liberté
Rules for classification: 1) Points; 2) Goal difference; 3) Number of goals scored

== Final stage ==
=== Play-down stage ===
ESF Amizour relegated to the Division 2.

=== Play-off stage ===
| Pos. | Team | Pld | W | D | L | GF | GA | GD | Pts | Qualification or relegation |
|---|---|---|---|---|---|---|---|---|---|---|
| 1 | Afak Relizane (C) | 5 | 5 | / | 0 | | | +6 | 14 | Qualification for Champions League |
| 2 | AS Sûreté Nationale | 5 | 3 | / | 2 | | | +6 | 11 | |
| 3 | ASE Alger Centre | 5 | 4 | / | 1 | | | +3 | 11 | |
| 4 | FC Constantine | 5 | 2 | / | 3 | | | 0 | 6 | |
| 5 | JF Khroub | 5 | 1 | / | 4 | | | –4 | 3 | |
| 6 | CF Akbou | 5 | 0 | / | 5 | | | –11 | 0 | |

Updated to match(es) played on 26 August 2021. Source: lff.dz
Rules for classification: 1) The winners have three points; 2) The winners after penalties free kicks have two points; 3) The losers have zero points
(C) Champion
