= 2016–17 Algerian Women's Championship =

Algerian Women's Championship
- Season: 2016–17
- Champions: Affak Relizane
- Goals: 652
- Top goalscorer: Djamila Marek (36 goals).
- All statistics correct as of 13 May 2017.

The 2016–17 Algerian Women's Championship is the 19th season of the Algerian Women's Championship, the Algerian national women's association football competition. Afak Relizane won the championship for the 8th time.

== Results ==
=== Groups ===
==== Group Centre-East ====
Pos	Team	Pld	W	D	L	GF	GA	GD	Pts	Qualification
1	FC Constantine	15	14	1	0	77	5	+72	43	Qualification to Play off
2	AS Sûreté Nationale	15	13	1	1	70	6	+64	40	Qualification to Play off
3	JF Khroub	16	9	2	5	31	14	+17	29	Qualification to Play off
4	MZ Biskra	14	7	3	4	22	21	+1	24	Qualification to Play off
5	ARTSF Tébessa	14	3	3	8	10	32	−22	12	
6	ESFOR Touggourt	14	2	3	9	9	39	−30	9	
7	AFW Oum Bouaghi	14	2	1	11	7	0	+7	7	
8	FJ Skikda	14	0	4	10	4	31	−27	4	

Updated to match(es) played on 24 November 2019. Source:
Rules for classification: 1) points; 2) goal difference; 3) number of goals scored.

==== Group Centre-West ====
Pos	Team	Pld	W	D	L	GF	GA	GD	Pts	Qualification
1	Affak Relizane	15	14	0	1	70	8	+62	42	Qualification to Play off
2	ASE Alger Centre	16	13	0	3	55	12	+43	39	Qualification to Play off
3	CF Akbou	15	9	1	5	29	23	+6	28	Qualification to Play off
4	AS Intissar Oran	14	6	2	6	24	27	−3	20	Qualification to Play off
5	FC Béjaïa	14	6	1	7	14	28	−14	19	
6	COS Tiaret	14	3	1	10	17	42	−25	10	
7	AS Oran Centre	14	2	1	11	9	29	−20	7	
8	SF El Attaf	14	1	0	13	3	58	−55	3	

Updated to match(es) played on 24 November 2019. Source:
Rules for classification: 1) points; 2) goal difference; 3) number of goals scored.

=== Play down ===
==== Play down Centre-East ====
Pos	Team	Pld	W	D	L	GF	GA	GD	Pts	Relegation
1	MZ Biskra	7	6	1	0	22	1	+21	19	
2	ESFOR Touggourt	7	5	1	1	13	3	+10	16	
3	ARTSF Tébessa	8	3	0	5	17	15	+2	9	
4	FJ Skikda	7	3	0	4	11	14	−3	9	
5	AFW Oum Bouaghi	7	0	0	7	3	33	−30	0	Relegation to 2017–18 W-Championship D2

Updated to match(es) played on 13 May 2017. Source: W-Championship play down
Rules for classification: 1) points; 2) goal difference; 3) number of goals scored.

==== Play down Centre-West ====
Pos	Team	Pld	W	D	L	GF	GA	GD	Pts	Relegation
1	AS Intissar Oran	7	5	1	1	8	5	+3	16	
2	AS Oran Centre	7	4	2	1	13	7	+6	14	
3	FC Béjaïa	7	3	1	3	10	8	+2	10	
4	COTS Tiaret	7	2	3	2	13	11	+2	9	
5	SF El Attaf	8	0	1	7	5	18	−13	1	Relegation to 2017–18 W-Championship D2

Updated to match(es) played on 15 May 2016. Source: W-Championship play down
Rules for classification: 1) points; 2) goal difference; 3) number of goals scored.

=== Play off ===
Pos	Team	Pld	W	D	L	GF	GA	GD	Pts	Qualification
1	Afak Relizane	10	8	2	0	29	9	+20	26	Champion
2	AS Sûreté Nationale	10	6	3	1	25	11	+14	21	
3	FC Constantine	10	5	2	3	20	12	+8	17	
4	ASE Alger Centre	10	3	3	4	15	12	+3	12	
5	JF Khroub	10	2	1	7	9	24	−15	7	
6	CF Akbou	10	0	1	9	6	36	−30	1	

Updated to match(es) played on 13 May 2017. Source: W-Championship play off
Rules for classification: 1) points; 2) goal difference; 3) number of goals scored.
