= 2022–23 Tunisian Women's Championship =

17th season of the Tunisian Women's Championship sport football

Tunisian Women's Championship
- Season: 2022–23
- Champions: ASF Sousse
- All statistics correct as of 30 May 2023.

The 2022–23 Tunisian Women's Championship is the 17th season of the Tunisian Women's Championship, the Tunisian national women's association football competition. AS Banque de l'Habitat are the defending champions. After declaring ASF Bouhajla winners, the title returned finally to ASF Sousse.

== Clubs ==
13 club

=== North Group ===
- AS Banque de l'Habitat
- ASF Bou Hajla
- ASF Sousse
- ASF Menzel Bourguiba
- AS Jérissa
- US tunisienne

=== South Group ===
- ASF Gafsa
- ASF El Guettar
- ASF Médenine
- ASF Sbeitla
- ASF Sbiba
- MS Sidi Bouzid
- PSF Sfax

== Group stage ==
=== Group A ===
Pos	Team	Pld	W	D	L	GF	GA	GD	Pts	Qualification or relegation
1	ASF Bouhajla	10	8	1	1	18	3	+15	25	Knockout stage
2	ASF Sousse	10	7	2	1	40	6	+34	23	Knockout stage
3	AS Banque de l'Habitat	10	6	1	3	22	13	+9	19	
4	US Tunisienne	10	4	1	5	10	24	−14	13	
5	Avenir Sportif Jrissa	10	2	1	7	5	26	−21	7	
6	ASF Manzel bourgiba	10	0	0	10	6	29	−23	0	Relegated

Updated to match(es) played on 08-April-2023. Source: page FFT Ligue Féminine
Rules for classification: 1) Points; 2) Goal difference; 3) Number of goals scored

==== Results ====
Home \ Away	ASFSO	ASBH	AVJ	ASFSB	ASFMB	UST
ASF Sousse		1–1	5–0	3–0	5–1	13–0
AS Banque de l'Habitat	2–6		3–0	0–2	2–1	4–1
Avenir Sportif Jrissa	0–5	0–3		0–0	2–1	0–2
ASF Bouhajla	1–0	2–0	3–0		Cancelled	2–0
ASF Manzel bourgiba	1–2	5–0	1–2	0–3		1–3
US Tunisienne	3–0	0–2	2–1	0–1	-	

Updated to match(es) played on unknown. Source: Tunisian Football Federation
Legend: Blue = home team win; Yellow = draw; Red = away team win.
For upcoming matches, an "a" indicates there is an article about the rivalry between the two participants.

=== Group B ===
Pos	Team	Pld	W	D	L	GF	GA	GD	Pts	Qualification or relegation
1	ASF Medenine	12	10	1	1	29	4	+25	31	Knockout stage
2	ASF El Gutar	12	8	2	2	37	4	+33	26	Knockout stage
3	MS Sidi Bouzid	12	7	2	3	33	9	+24	23	
4	PSF Sfax	12	5	2	5	23	12	+11	17	
5	ASF Sbiba	12	4	1	7	23	27	−4	13	
6	ASF Sbeitla	12	4	0	8	16	21	−5	12	Relegated
7	ASF Gafsa	12	0	0	12	1	85	−84	0	Relegated

Updated to match(es) played on 08-April-2023. Source: page FFT Ligue Féminine
Rules for classification: 1) Points; 2) Goal difference; 3) Number of goals scored

==== Results ====
Home \ Away	ASFGA	ASFME	MSSB	PSFSF	ASFSB	ASFG	ASFSBI
ASF Gafsa		0–10	-	0–2	0–4	0–10	0–17
ASF Medenine	3–0		2–1	-	2–1	1–0	3–0
MS Sidi Bouzid	5–0	0–3		1–1	7–0	1–1	
PSF Sfax		0–2	1–3		1–0	0–1	2–1
ASF Sbeitla	5–0	1–4	2–0	1–0		0–3	2–1
ASF El Gutar	11–0	0–2	3–0	1–0	5–1		2–1
ASF Sbiba	5–1	1–0	0–6	2–0	6–2	-	

Updated to match(es) played on unknown. Source: Tunisian Football Federation
Legend: Blue = home team win; Yellow = draw; Red = away team win.
For upcoming matches, an "a" indicates there is an article about the rivalry between the two participants.

== Play Off ==
Pos	Team	Pld	W	D	L	GF	GA	GD	Pts	Qualification or relegation
1	ASF Sousse	6	5	0	1	18	3	+15	15	Winner
2	ASF Bouhajla	6	5	0	1	12	4	+8	15	
3	ASF Medenine	6	1	1	4	3	14	−11	4	
4	ASF El Gutar	6	0	1	5	3	15	−12	1	

Updated to match(es) played on 25 May 2023. Source: page FFT Ligue Féminine
Rules for classification: 1) Points; 2) Goal difference; 3) Number of goals scored

=== Results ===
Home \ Away	ASFS	ASFME	ASFB	ASFG
ASF Sousse		6–0	0–1	3–1
ASF Medenine	0–3		0–2	3–0
ASF Bouhajla	0–3	3–0		3–0
ASF El Gutar	1–3	0–0	1–4	

Updated to match(es) played on unknown. Source: Tunisian Football Federation
Legend: Blue = home team win; Yellow = draw; Red = away team win.
For upcoming matches, an "a" indicates there is an article about the rivalry between the two participants.
