= 2015–16 Algerian Women's Championship =

Algerian Women's Championship
- Season: 2015–16
- Champions: Afak Relizane
- All statistics correct as of 9 October 2016.

The 2015–16 Algerian Women's Championship is the eighteenth season of the Algerian Women's Championship, the Algerian national women's association football competition. Afak Relizane won the championship for the seventh time.

== Clubs ==
=== Stadia and locations ===
Locations of teams in the 2015–16 Algerian Women's Championship

Team	Location	Stadium	Capacity
Afak Relizane	Relizane		
ARTSF Tébessa	Tébessa		
ASD Tizi-Ouzou	Tizi Ouzou	Stade 1er Novembre 1954	25,000
ASE Alger Centre	Algiers		
AS Intissar Oran	Oran	Stade Fréha Benyoucef	5,000
AS Oran Centre	Oran		
AS Sûreté Nationale	Algiers		
CF Akbou	Akbou		
COTS Tiaret	Tiaret		
ESFOR Touggourt	Touggourt		
FC Béjaïa	Béjaïa		
FC Constantine	Constantine		
FJ Skikda	Skikda		
JF Khroub	El Khroub		
MZ Biskra	Biskra		
UM Djelfa	Djelfa		

== Results ==
=== Groups ===
==== Group Centre-East ====
Pos	Team	Pld	W	D	L	GF	GA	GD	Pts	Qualification
1	AS Sûreté Nationale	13	11	2	0	56	5	+51	35	Qualification to Play off
2	JF Khroub	14	10	3	1	56	9	+47	33	Qualification to Play off
3	FC Constantine	14	9	4	1	76	12	+64	31	Qualification to Play off
4	MZ Biskra	13	6	1	6	21	22	−1	19	Qualification to Play off
5	ESFOR Touggourt	13	6	0	7	15	30	−15	18	
6	FC Béjaïa	13	5	0	8	18	21	−3	15	
7	ARTSF Tébessa	14	1	1	12	3	75	−72	4	
8	FJ Skikda	14	0	1	13	7	78	−71	1	

Updated to match(es) played on 15 May 2016. Source: W-Championship
Rules for classification: 1) points; 2) goal difference; 3) number of goals scored.

==== Group Centre-West ====
Pos	Team	Pld	W	D	L	GF	GA	GD	Pts	Qualification
1	Afak Relizane	14	14	0	0	90	3	+87	42	Qualification to Play off
2	ASE Alger Centre	14	11	0	3	55	8	+47	33	Qualification to Play off
3	AS Intissar Oran	13	8	1	4	36	21	+15	25	Qualification to Play off
4	AS Oran Centre	14	6	3	5	20	26	−6	21	Qualification to Play off
5	CF Akbou	14	5	1	8	21	26	−5	16	
6	COTS Tiaret	13	2	3	8	9	44	−35	9	
7	ASD Tizi-Ouzou	14	2	2	10	9	46	−37	8	
8	UM Djelfa	14	1	2	11	8	74	−66	5	

Updated to match(es) played on 15 May 2016. Source: W-Championship
Rules for classification: 1) points; 2) goal difference; 3) number of goals scored.

=== Play down ===
Pos	Team	Pld	W	D	L	GF	GA	GD	Pts	Relegation
1	CF Akbou	7	4	3	0	14	1	+13	15	
2	FC Béjaïa	7	4	2	1	14	5	+9	14	
3	COTS Tiaret	7	4	1	2	12	11	+1	13	
4	ESFOR Touggourt	7	3	2	2	11	11	0	11	
5	ARTSF Tébessa	7	2	4	1	8	8	0	10	
6	FJ Skikda	7	2	1	4	10	18	−8	7	
7	ASD Tizi-Ouzou	7	2	0	5	12	11	+1	6	Relegation to 2016–17 W-Championship D2
8	UM Djelfa	7	0	1	6	2	18	−16	1	Relegation to 2016–17 W-Championship D2

Updated to match(es) played on 15 May 2016. Source: W-Championship play down
Rules for classification: 1) points; 2) goal difference; 3) number of goals scored.

=== Play off ===
Pos	Team	Pld	W	D	L	GF	GA	GD	Pts	Qualification
1	Afak Relizane	7	7	0	0	23	3	+20	21	Champion
2	FC Constantine	7	6	0	1	19	5	+14	18	
3	JF Khroub	7	3	2	2	15	16	−1	11	
4	ASE Alger Centre	7	3	1	3	8	7	+1	10	
5	AS Sûreté Nationale	7	2	3	2	15	6	+9	9	
6	AS Intissar Oran	7	1	2	4	7	15	−8	5	
7	AS Oran Centre	7	1	1	5	5	21	−16	4	
8	MZ Biskra	7	0	1	6	2	21	−19	1	

Updated to match(es) played on 15 May 2016. Source: W-Championship playoff
Rules for classification: 1) points; 2) goal difference; 3) number of goals scored.
