= 2021–22 Algerian Women's Championship =

Elite Championship
- Season: 2021–22
- Dates: 6 November 2021 – 1 April 2022
- Champions: Afak Relizane
- Relegated: AS Oran Centre
- W-Champions League: Afak Relizane
- Matches played: 110
- Goals scored: 510 (4.64 per match)
- Top goalscorer: (Algeria) Djamila Benaissa
- Biggest home win: Afak Relizane 22–0 AS Oran Centre (18 January 2022)
- Biggest away win: AS Oran Centre 0–16 JF Khroub (15 March 2022)
- Highest scoring: Afak Relizane 22–0 AS Oran Centre (18 January 2022)
- Longest winning run: JF Khroub (8 matches)
- Longest unbeaten run: Afak Relizane (20 "all" matches)
- Longest winless run: MZ Biskra (19 matches)
- Longest losing run: AS Oran Centre (17 "all" matches)
- All statistics correct as of 23 April 2022.

The 2021–22 Algerian Women's Elite Championship was the 24th season of the Algerian Women's Championship, the Algerian national women's association football competition. Afak Relizane won the competition for the tenth time and will partiticipate to the 2022 CAF Women's Champions League.

== Clubs ==
Locations of teams for the 2021–22 Algerian Ligue Professionnelle 1

Team	City	Stadium	Capacity
ASE Alger Centre	Algiers	Ouled Fayet Communal Stadium	
AS Sureté Nationale	Algiers	Ouled Fayet Communal Stadium	
FC Béjaia	Béjaïa	Naceria Communal Stadium	
MZ Biskra	Biskra	Noureddine Menani Stadium	
FC Constantine	Constantine	Ramadane Ben Abdelmalek Stadium	13 000
JF Khroub	El Khroub	Abed Hamdani Stadium	10 000
AR Guelma	Guelma	Stade Souidani Boujemaa	15 000
AS Intissar Oran	Oran	Allal Toula Stadium	5 000
AS Oran Centre	Oran	Allal Toula Stadium	5 000
CF Akbou	Akbou	OPOD Stadium	
Afak Relizane	Relizane	Tahar Zoughari Stadium	30 000

== Standings ==
Pos	Team	Pld	W	D	L	GF	GA	GD	Pts	Qualification or relegation	AR	JFK	CFA	ASSN	FCC	ASAC	ASIO	FCB	ARG	MZB	ASOC
1	Afak Relizane (C)	20	17	3	0	104	8	+96	54	Qualification for 2022 CAF W-CL	—	0–0	4–1	3–0	2–1	4–2	9–0	3–0	4–0	10–0	22–0
2	JF Khroub	20	16	3	1	72	7	+65	51		0–0	—	0–0	2–3	2–0	1–0	4–0	4–0	10–0	8–0	8–0
3	CF Akbou	20	15	2	3	80	18	+62	47		1–5	0–1	—	2–2	2–1	2–1	8–0	2–1	4–1	8–0	13–0
4	AS Sûreté Nationale	20	13	2	5	80	26	+54	41		0–4	1–3	0–1	—	2–0	3–1	5–1	4–0	5–1	11–0	13–0
5	FC Constantine	20	12	2	6	62	17	+45	38		2–2	0–2	1–2	3–1	—	1–0	9–0	4–0	6–0	9–0	7–1
6	ASE Alger Centre	20	10	2	8	58	18	+40	32		0–3	0–1	0–1	1–1	1–1	—	4–0	2–0	2–0	6–0	6–0
7	AS Intissar Oran	20	5	2	13	14	72	−58	17		0–8	1–7	1–4	2–6	0–1	0–3	—	1–1	1–0	1–0	2–0
8	FC Béjaïa	20	3	4	13	17	48	−31	13		0–3	0–2	0–3	2–4	0–5	0–6	1–1	—	5–1	3–0	3–1
9	AR Guelma	20	4	1	15	12	68	−56	13		0–5	1–3	0–4	0–7	0–4	0–6	2–1	1–0	—	0–0	4–0
10	MZ Biskra	20	1	3	16	5	87	−82	6		1–6	1–2	0–6	0–4	0–3	0–6	0–1	0–0	0–1	—	1–0
11	AS Oran Centre	20	1	2	17	6	141	−135	5	Relegated	0–7	0–12	0–16	0–8	0–4	0–11	0–1	1–1	1–0	2–2	—

Updated to match(es) played on 1 April 2022. Source: lff.dz
Rules for classification: 1) Points; 2) Goal difference; 3) Number of goals scored
(C) Champions

== Statistics ==
=== Best goalscorers ===
- (Algeria) Djamila Benaissa (CF Akbou)
