= 2014–15 Algerian Women's Championship =

Algerian Women's Championship
- Season: 2014–15
- Champions: Afak Relizane
- All statistics correct as of 15 May 2016.

The 2014–15 Algerian Women's Championship was the 17th season of the Algerian Women's Championship, the Algerian national women's association football competition. Afak Relizane won the championship for the sixth time consecutively.

== Teams ==
Teams in Play off :

- Afak Relizane
- AS Sûreté Nationale
- ASE Alger Centre
- FC Constantine
- JF Khroub
- AS Intissar Oran
- FC Béjaïa
- USF Béjaïa
