= Algerian Women's League Cup =

Algerian Women's League Cup كأس الرابطة الجزائرية للسيدات
- Founded: 2016
- Region: Algeria
- Current champions: CS Constantine (1st title)
- Most championships: AS Sûreté Nationale; CS Constantine; ASE Alger Centre; CF Akbou (1 title each)
- Website: lnff.dz
- 2023–24

The Algerian Women's League Cup (Arabic: كأس الرابطة الجزائرية للسيدات) is a women's association football competition in Algeria pitting regional teams against each other. It was established in 2016.

== Finals ==
Year	Winners	Score	Runners-up	Venue
2016–17	ASE Alger Centre	1–1 (4–3 p)	AS Sûreté Nationale	Ahmed Zabana Stadium, Oran
2017–18	AS Sûreté Nationale	0–0 (5–4 p)	FC Constantine	Ahmed Zabana Stadium, Oran
2018–19	FC Constantine	2–1	AS Sûreté Nationale	Omar Hamadi Stadium, Algiers
2023–24	CF Akbou	4–2	CR Belouizdad	Salem Mabrouki Stadium, Rouïba, Algiers

== Most successful clubs ==
Club	Winners	Runners-up	Winning Cups	Runners-up
AS Sûreté Nationale	1	2	2018	2017, 2019
CS Constantine	1	1	2019	2018
ASE Alger Centre	1	0	2017	
CF Akbou	1	0	2024	
CR Belouizdad	0	1		2024

- CS Constantine (ex. FC Constantine)

== See also ==
- Algerian Women's Championship
- Algerian Women's Cup
- Algerian Women's Super Cup
