= 2022–23 Algerian Women's Championship =

Elite National Championship
- Season: 2022–23
- Dates: 21 October 2022 – 10 March 2023
- Champions: Afak Relizane
- Relegated: AS Intissar Oran
- W-Champions League: Afak Relizane
- Matches: 72
- Goals: 372 (5.17 per match)
- Biggest home win: CF Akbou 19–0 AS Intissar Oran (21 October 2022)
- Biggest away win: AS Intissar Oran 0–18 JF Khroub (3 March 2023)
- Highest scoring: CF Akbou 19–0 AS Intissar Oran (21 October 2022)
- Longest winning run: Afak Relizane (8 matches)
- Longest unbeaten run: Afak Relizane (14 "all" matches)
- Longest winless run: AS Intissar Oran (15 matches)
- Longest losing run: AS Intissar Oran (14 "all" matches)
- All statistics correct as of 10 March 2023.

The 2022–23 Elite National Championship is the 25th season of the Algerian Women's Championship, the Algerian national women's association football competition. The winners of the competition will partiticipate to the 2023 CAF Women's Champions League. Afak Relizane wins the championship for the 11th time.

== Clubs ==
Locations of the 2022–23 Elite National Championship

Team	City	Stadium	Capacity
CF Akbou	Akbou	Hocine Bouchaib Stadium (Seddouk)	
ASE Alger Centre	Algiers	Omar Hamadi Stadium	12 000
FC Béjaia	Béjaïa	Naceria Communal Stadium	
MZ Biskra	Biskra	Noureddine Mennani Stadium	12 000
CS Constantine	Constantine	Ramadane Ben Abdelmalek Stadium	13 000
JF Khroub	El Khroub	Abed Hamdani Stadium	10 000
AR Guelma	Guelma	Stade Souidani Boujemaa	15 000
AS Intissar Oran	Oran	Fréha Benyoucef Stadium	4 000
Afak Relizane	Relizane	Tahar Zoughari Stadium	30 000

== Standings ==
Pos	Team	Pld	W	D	L	GF	GA	GD	Pts	Qualification or relegation	AR	JFK	CSC	CFA	ASAC	FCB	ARG	MZB	ASIO
1	Afak Relizane (C)	16	12	2	2	58	12	+46	38	Qualification for 2023 CAF W-CL	—	2–2	1–0	1–0	2–1	3–0	9–0	6–0	7–0
2	JF Khroub	16	12	2	2	69	9	+60	38		1–2	—	2–1	2–0	1–1	3–0	7–0	5–0	3–0
3	CS Constantine	16	10	3	3	72	14	+58	33		2–2	1–2	—	2–0	4–2	3–0	11–0	7–0	15–0
4	CF Akbou	16	10	3	3	71	12	+59	33		3–1	2–1	2–2	—	1–1	7–0	8–0	6–1	19–0
5	ASE Alger Centre	16	9	4	3	64	12	+52	31		2–0	0–1	1–1	1–1	—	7–0	8–0	3–0	13–0
6	FC Béjaïa	16	4	2	10	12	40	−28	14		0–3	0–2	1–3	0–2	1–3	—	1–1	0–0	1–0
7	AR Guelma	16	3	2	11	15	91	−76	11		0–8	0–15	1–7	0–6	0–5	1–3	—	2–1	8–1
8	MZ Biskra	16	1	2	13	9	49	−40	5		1–3	0–4	0–3	0–2	0–3	1–2	1–1	—	3–0
9	AS Intissar Oran	16	1	0	15	4	135	−131	3	Relegation to 2023–24 D1 National Champ.	0–8	0–18	0–10	0–12	0–13	1–3	0–1	2–1	—

Updated to match(es) played on 10 March 2023. Source: lff.dz
Rules for classification: 1) Points; 2) Results between teams 3) Goal difference; 4) Number of goals scored
(C) Champions

== Matches ==
=== First leg ===
Matches - 1st leg
1st day

21 October 2022 1	ASE Alger Centre	7–0	FC Béjaïa	Algiers
9:30 DPRA		Report		Stadium: Omar Hamadi Stadium

21 October 2022 1	CF Akbou	19–0	AS Intissar Oran	Seddouk
10:30 DPRA		Report		Stadium: Hocine Bouchaib Stadium

21 October 2022 1	AR Guelma	0–8	Afak Relizane	Guelma
9:00 DPRA		Report		Stadium: Stade Souidani Boujemaa

21 October 2022 1	JF Khroub	5–0	MZ Biskra	El Khroub
9:00 DPRA		Report		Stadium: Abed Hamdani Stadium

2nd day

4 November 2022 2	CS Constantine	11–0	AR Guelma	Constantine
11:00 DPRA		Report		Stadium: Ramadane Ben Abdelmalek Stadium

4 November 2022 2	AS Intissar Oran	0–13	ASE Alger Centre	Oran
10:00 DPRA		Report		Stadium: Fréha Benyoucef Stadium

4 November 2022 2	Afak Relizane	2–2	JF Khroub	Relizane
10:00 DPRA		Report		Stadium: Tahar Zoughari Stadium

5 November 2022 2	MZ Biskra	0–2	CF Akbou	Biskra
9:00 DPRA		Report		Stadium: Noureddine Mennani Stadium

3rd day

11 November 2022 3	JF Khroub	2–1	CS Constantine	El Khroub
10:00 DPRA		Report		Stadium: Abed Hamdani Stadium

11 November 2022 3	AS Intissar Oran	2–1	MZ Biskra	Oran
10:00 DPRA		Report		Stadium: Kaddour Keloua Stadium

11 November 2022 3	AR Guelma	1–3	FC Béjaia	Guelma
10:00 DPRA		Report		Stadium: Stade Souidani Boujemaa

11 November 2022 3	CF Akbou	3–1	Afak Relizane	Seddouk
10:00 DPRA		Report		Stadium: Hocine Bouchaib Stadium

4th day

18 November 2022 4	Afak Relizane	6–0	MZ Biskra	Relizane
--:-- DPRA				Stadium: Tahar Zoughari Stadium

18 November 2022 4	ASE Alger Centre	8–0	AR Guelma	Algiers
--:-- DPRA				Stadium: Omar Hamadi Stadium

18 November 2022 4	CS Constantine	2–0	CF Akbou	Constantine
--:-- DPRA				Stadium: Ramadane Ben Abdelmalek Stadium

18 November 2022 4	FC Béjaia	0–2	JF Khroub	Béjaia
--:-- DPRA				Stadium: Naceria Communal Stadium

5th day

25 November 2022 5	AS Intissar Oran	0–8	Afak Relizane	Oran
--:-- DPRA				Stadium: Fréha Benyoucef Stadium

25 November 2022 5	MZ Biskra	0–3	CS Constantine	Biskra
--:-- DPRA				Stadium: Noureddine Mennani Stadium

25 November 2022 5	JF Khroub	1–1	ASE Alger Centre	El Khroub
--:-- DPRA				Stadium: Abed Hamdani Stadium

25 November 2022 5	CF Akbou	7–0	FC Béjaia	Seddouk
--:-- DPRA				Stadium: Hocine Bouchaib Stadium

6th day

2 December 2022 6	AR Guelma	8–1	AS Intissar Oran	Guelma
--:-- DPRA				Stadium: Stade Souidani Boujemaa

2 December 2022 6	CS Constantine	2–2	Afak Relizane	Constantine
--:-- DPRA				Stadium: Ramadane Ben Abdelmalek Stadium

2 December 2022 6	FC Béjaia	0–0	MZ Biskra	Béjaia
--:-- DPRA				Stadium: Naceria Communal Stadium

2 December 2022 6	ASE Alger Centre	1–1	CF Akbou	Algiers
--:-- DPRA				Stadium: Omar Hamadi Stadium

7th day

9 December 2022 7	AS Intissar Oran	0–10	CS Constantine	Oran
--:-- DPRA				Stadium: Fréha Benyoucef Stadium

9 December 2022 7	JF Khroub	7–0	AR Guelma	El Khroub
--:-- DPRA				Stadium: Abed Hamdani Stadium

9 December 2022 7	Afak Relizane	3–0	FC Béjaia	Relizane
--:-- DPRA				Stadium: Tahar Zoughari Stadium

9 December 2022 7	MZ Biskra	0–3	ASE Alger Centre	Biskra
--:-- DPRA				Stadium: Noureddine Mennani Stadium

8th day

16 December 2022 8	JF Khroub	3–0	AS Intissar Oran	El Khroub
--:-- DPRA				Stadium: Abed Hamdani Stadium

16 December 2022 8	FC Béjaia	1–3	CS Constantine	Béjaia
--:-- DPRA				Stadium: Naceria Communal Stadium

16 December 2022 8	AR Guelma	0–6	CF Akbou	Guelma
--:-- DPRA				Stadium: Stade Souidani Boujemaa

16 December 2022 8	ASE Alger Centre	2–0	Afak Relizane	Algiers
--:-- DPRA				Stadium: Omar Hamadi Stadium

9th day

23 December 2022 9	AS Intissar Oran	1–3	FC Béjaia	Oran
--:-- DPRA				Stadium: Fréha Benyoucef Stadium

23 December 2022 9	CF Akbou	2–1	JF Khroub	Seddouk
--:-- DPRA				Stadium: Hocine Bouchaib Stadium

23 December 2022 9	CS Constantine	4–2	ASE Alger Centre	Constantine
--:-- DPRA				Stadium: Ramadane Ben Abdelmalek Stadium

9	MZ Biskra	1–1	AR Guelma	Biskra
--:-- DPRA				Stadium: Noureddine Mennani Stadium

=== Second leg ===
Matches - 2nd leg
10th day

6 January 2023 10	FC Béjaïa	1–3	ASE Alger Centre	Béjaïa
--:-- DPRA

6 January 2023 10	AS Intissar Oran	0–12	CF Akbou	Oran
--:-- DPRA

6 January 2023 10	Afak Relizane	9–0	AR Guelma	Relizane
--:-- DPRA

6 January 2023 10	MZ Biskra	0–4	JF Khroub	Biskra
--:-- DPRA

11th day

12 January 2023 11	AR Guelma	1–7	CS Constantine	Guelma
--:-- DPRA

12 January 2023 11	ASE Alger Centre	13–0	AS Intissar Oran	Algiers
--:-- DPRA

12 January 2023 11	JF Khroub	1–2	Afak Relizane	El Khroub
--:-- DPRA

12 January 2023 11	CF Akbou	6–1	MZ Biskra	Seddouk
--:-- DPRA

12th day

16 January 2023 12	CS Constantine	1–2	JF Khroub	Constantine
--:-- DPRA

17 January 2023 12	MZ Biskra	3–0	AS Intissar Oran	Biskra
--:-- DPRA

17 January 2023 12	FC Béjaia	1–1	AR Guelma	Béjaia
--:-- DPRA

17 January 2023 12	Afak Relizane	1–0	CF Akbou	Relizane
--:-- DPRA

13th day

20 January 2023 13	MZ Biskra	1–3	Afak Relizane	Biskra
--:-- DPRA

20 January 2023 13	AR Guelma	0–5	ASE Alger Centre	Guelma
--:-- DPRA

20 January 2023 13	CF Akbou	2–2	CS Constantine	Seddouk
--:-- DPRA

20 January 2023 13	JF Khroub	3–0	FC Béjaia	El Khroub
--:-- DPRA

14th day

27 January 2023 14	Afak Relizane	7–0	AS Intissar Oran	Relizane
--:-- DPRA

27 January 2023 14	CS Constantine	7–0	MZ Biskra	Constantine
--:-- DPRA

27 January 2023 14	ASE Alger Centre	0–1	JF Khroub	Algiers
--:-- DPRA

27 January 2023 14	FC Béjaia	0–2	CF Akbou	Béjaia
--:-- DPRA

15th day

3 February 2023 15	AS Intissar Oran	0–1	AR Guelma	Oran
--:-- DPRA

3 February 2023 15	Afak Relizane	1–0	CS Constantine	Relizane
--:-- DPRA

3 February 2023 15	MZ Biskra	1–2	FC Béjaia	Biskra
--:-- DPRA

3 February 2023 15	CF Akbou	1–1	ASE Alger Centre	Seddouk
--:-- DPRA

16th day

10 February 2023 16	CS Constantine	15–0	AS Intissar Oran	Constantine
--:-- DPRA

10 February 2023 16	AR Guelma	0–15	JF Khroub	Guelma
--:-- DPRA

10 February 2023 16	FC Béjaia	0–3	Afak Relizane	Béjaia
--:-- DPRA

10 February 2023 16	ASE Alger Centre	3–0	MZ Biskra	Algiers
--:-- DPRA

17th day

3 March 2023 17	AS Intissar Oran	0–18	JF Khroub	Oran
--:-- DPRA

3 March 2023 17	CS Constantine	3–0	FC Béjaia	Constantine
--:-- DPRA

3 March 2023 17	CF Akbou	8–0	AR Guelma	Seddouk
--:-- DPRA

3 March 2023 17	Afak Relizane	2–1	ASE Alger Centre	Relizane
--:-- DPRA

18th day

10 March 2023 18	FC Béjaia	1–0	AS Intissar Oran	Béjaia
--:-- DPRA

10 March 2023 18	JF Khroub	2–0	CF Akbou	El Khroub
--:-- DPRA

10 March 2023 18	ASE Alger Centre	1–1	CS Constantine	Algiers
--:-- DPRA

10 March 2023 18	AR Guelma	2–1	MZ Biskra	Guelma
--:-- DPRA
