= Sana Yaakoubi =

Tunisian footballer (born 1995)

Personal information
- Date of birth: 18 March 1995 (age 31)
- Position: Defender

Team information
- Current team: Al Ahli SFC

Senior career*
Years	Team	Apps	(Gls)
–2022	AS Banque de l'Habitat		
2022–2023	Al Ahli SFC		

International career
- Tunisia
- * Club domestic league appearances and goals

Sana Yaakoubi (Arabic: سناء يعقوبي; born 18 March 1995) is a Tunisian footballer who last played as a defender for Saudi club Al Ahli SFC and the Tunisia women's national team.

== Club career ==
Yaakoubi has played for AS Banque de l'Habitat in Tunisia.

== International career ==
Yaakoubi has capped for Tunisia at senior level, including in a 2–0 friendly away win over Jordan on 13 June 2021.

== See also ==
- List of Tunisia women's international footballers
