= 2011–12 Algerian Women's Championship =

Algerian Women's Championship
- Season: 2011–12
- Champions: Afak Relizane
- All statistics correct as of 31 December 2016.

The 2011–12 Algerian Women's Championship was the 14th season of the Algerian Women's Championship, the Algerian national women's association football competition. Afak Relizane won the championship for the third consecutive time.

== 2011-12 teams ==
- Afak Relizane
- ASE Alger Centre
- CLT Belouizdad
- FC Béjaïa
- JF Khroub
- FC Constantine
- COS Tiaret
- AS Oran Centre
- USF Béjaïa
- FC Russicada (Skiskda) (promoted)
- AS Noudjoum Wahran (Oran) (promoted)
- UM Djelfa (promoted)

== Results ==
Pos	Team	Pld	W	D	L	F	A	GD	Pts	Notes
1	Afak Relizane	22	22	0	0				66	Champions
2	CLT Belouizdad	22							52	
3	ASE Alger Centre	22							50	
4	FC Béjaïa	22							45	
5	FC Constantine	22							40	
6	JF Khroub	22							40	
7	COTS Tiaret	22							23	
8	AS Noudjoum Wahran	22							22	
9	AS Oran Centre	22							19	
10	USF Béjaïa	22							14	
11	UM Djelfa	22							7	Relegation to 2012–13 W-Championship D2
12	FC Russicada	22							4	Relegation to 2012–13 W-Championship D2
