= 2012–13 Algerian Women's Championship =

Algerian Women's Championship
- Season: 2012–13
- Champions: Afak Relizane
- All statistics correct as of 31 December 2016.

The 2012–13 Algerian Women's Championship was the 15th season of the Algerian Women's Championship, the Algerian national women's association football competition. Afak Relizane won the championship for the fourth consecutive time.

== 2012-13 teams ==
- Affak Relizane
- ASE Alger Centre
- AS Noudjoum Wahran (Oran)
- AS Oran Centre
- COTS Tiaret
- FC Béjaïa
- FC Constantine
- JF Khroub
- USF Béjaïa
- AS Intissar Oran (promoted)

== Results ==
Pos	Team	Pld	W	D	L	F	A	GD	Pts	Notes
1	Afak Relizane	18	18	0	0				54	Champions
2	ASE Alger Centre	18	15	0	3				45	
3	FC Constantine	18							38	
4	JF Khroub	18							36	
5	AS Oran Centre	18							20	
6	AS Intissar Oran	18							19	
7	USF Béjaïa	18							15	
8	FC Béjaïa	18							15	
9	COTS Tiaret	18							12	
10	AS Noudjoum Wahran	18	0	3	15				3	Relegation to 2013–14 W-Championship D2
