= Tunisian Women's Cup =

Tunisian Women's Cup كأس تونس للسيدات
- Founded: 2004; 22 years ago
- Region: Tunisia
- Current champions: ASF Sousse (1st title)
- Most championships: ASF Sahel (8 titles)
- Broadcaster: El Wataniya
- Website: ftf.org.tn
- 2022–23 W-Cup

The Tunisian Women's Cup (Arabic: كأس تونس للسيدات) is a women's association football competition in Tunisia. pitting regional teams against each other. It was established in 2004. It is the women's equivalent of the Tunisian Cup for men. The winner of the 2023 edition is ASF Sousse for the first time.

== History ==
The first Tunisian women's Cup was contested in 2004-05 season.

== Finals ==
Year	Winners	Score	Runners-up	Venue
2004–05	ASF Sahel	4–1	US Tunisienne	Stade Chedly Zouiten, Tunis
2005–06	CS ISSEPC Kef	1–1 (a.e.t.), (3–1 p)	US Tunisienne	Stade El Menzah, Tunis
2006–07	ASF Sahel	3–2 (a.e.t.)	Tunisair Club	
2007–08	CS ISSEPC Kef	2–1	AS Banque de l'Habitat	
2008–09	Tunisair Club	2–1	ASF Sahel	
2009–10	AS Banque de l'Habitat	3–3 (a.e.t.), (3–1 p)	US Tunisienne	
2010–11	Tunisair Club	3–1	AS Banque de l'Habitat	
2011–12	Tunisair Club	5–0	ASF Médenine	
2012–13	ASF Sahel	3–2	AS Banque de l'Habitat	Stade Chedly Zouiten, Tunis
2013–14	ASF Sahel	3–1	Tunisair Club	
2014–15	ASF Sahel	1–1 (a.e.t.), (3–1 p)	Tunisair Club	
2015–16	ASF Sahel	4–2	Tunisair Club	
2016–17	ASF Sahel	2–0	US Tunisienne	
2017–18	ASF Sahel	2–0	US Tunisienne	
2018–19	ASF Gafsa	1–1 (a.e.t.), (4–2 p)	ASF Sahel	Stade Chedly Zouiten, Tunis
2019–20	cancelled because of the COVID-19 pandemic in Tunisia			
2020–21	not played			
2021–22	not played			
2022–23	ASF Sousse	4–0	US Tunisienne	Stade Chedly Zouiten, Tunis

== Most successful clubs ==
Club	Winners	Runners-Up	Winning Cups	Runners-Up
ASF Sahel	8	2	2005, 2007, 2013, 2014, 2015, 2016, 2017, 2018	2009, 2019
Tunisair Club	3	4	2009, 2011, 2012	2007, 2014, 2015, 2016
CS ISSEPC Kef	2	0	2006, 2008	
AS Banque de l'Habitat	1	3	2010	2008, 2011, 2013
ASF Gafsa	1	0	2019	
ASF Sousse	1	0	2023	
US Tunisienne	0	6		2005, 2006, 2010, 2017, 2018, 2023
ASF Médenine	0	1		2012

== See also ==
- Tunisian Women's Championship
- Tunisian Women's Super Cup
- Tunisian Women's League Cup
- National Union of Tunisian Women Cup
