= 2013–14 Algerian Women's Championship =

Algerian Women's Championship
- Season: 2013–14
- Champions: Afak Relizane
- All statistics correct as of 17 May 2016.

The 2013–14 Algerian Women's Championship was the 16th season of the Algerian Women's Championship, the Algerian national women's association football competition. Afak Relizane won the championship for the fifth time consecutively.

== Results ==
Pos	Team	Pld	W	D	L	F	A	GD	Pts	Notes
1	Afak Relizane	22							64	Champion
2	ASE Alger Centre	22							56	
3	AS Sûreté Nationale	22							51	
4	FC Constantine	22							43	
5	JF Khroub	22							37	
6	AS Intissar Oran	22							36	
7	FC Béjaïa	22							23	
8	USF Béjaïa	22							20	
9	MO Khroub	22							19	
10	AS Oran Centre	22							18	
11	COTS Tiaret	22							10	
12	ASJ Canastel Oran	22							2	Relegation to 2014–15 W-Championship D2
