= UNAF Women's Club Tournament =

- Founded: 2007
- Region: North Africa (UNAF)
- Teams: 4
- Current champions: (Tunisia) ASF Sahel (1st title)
- Most championships: (Algeria) ASE Alger Centre (Morocco) FC Berrechid (Tunisia) ASF Sahel (1 title each)
- Website: unaf-foot.com

The UNAF Women's Club Tournament (Arabic: دورة إتحاد شمال إفريقيا للأندية للسيدات) is an international club women's association football club competition run by the Union of North African Football Federations (UNAF). The top club sides from North Africa's football women's leagues are invited to participate in this competition.

== History ==
The competition started in 2007 after decision of the UNAF committee. The three first editions were held successfully. The 2010 UNAF Women's Club Tournament, initially held from 12 to 18 July 2010 in Morocco was postponed because of the withdrawal on first of Wadi Degla from Egypt which were replaced by the Moroccan team Raja CA. however ASE Alger Centre from Algeria declared to withdraw, so the organisation committee declared the tournament cancelled. The 2011 UNAF Women's Club Tournament, initially held in May 2011 was cancelled also but because Tunisian Revolution, however, UNAF negotiated with a Tunisian champion AS Banque de l'Habitat to organize the competition in Aïn Draham from 23 June to 3 July but it was finally cancelled too.

== Finals ==
UNAF Women's Club Tournament finals
Season	Winners	Score	Runners-up	Venue	Attendance
2007	(Morocco) FC Berrechid	^{n/a}	(Algeria) ASE Alger Centre	El Menzah Stadium, Tunis	
2008	(Algeria) ASE Alger Centre	^{n/a}	(Tunisia) CS ISSEPC Kef	20 August Stadium, Algiers	
2009	(Tunisia) ASF Sahel	^{n/a}	(Egypt) Wadi Degla	Suez	
2010	Postponed			Morocco	—
2011	Canceled because Tunisian Revolution			Municipal Stadium, Aïn Draham	—

^n/a A round-robin tournament determined the final standings.

== Records and statistics ==
=== Performance by club ===
Num	Club	Winners	Runners-up	Years won	Years runners-up
1	(Algeria) ASE Alger Centre	1	1	2008	2007
2	(Morocco) FC Berrechid	1	0	2007	
2	(Tunisia) ASF Sahel	1	0	2009	
4	(Tunisia) CS ISSEPC Kef	0	1		2008
4	(Egypt) Wadi Degla	0	1		2009

=== Performance by nation ===
Num	Nation	Winners	Runners-up
1	Algeria	1	1
1	Tunisia	1	1
3	Morocco	1	0
4	Egypt	0	1

== Maghreb Women's Club Tournament ==
The tournament was a related annual competition held in Aïn Defla, Algeria from 2010 to 2012. Women's clubs from Algeria, Morocco and Tunisia took part in these three editions. Afak Relizane won the tournament twice in 2010 and 2012 while ASE Alger Centre won once in 2011.

== See also ==
- CAF Women's Champions League UNAF Qualifiers
