= Bourouba =

Coordinates: 36°42′53″N 3°06′23″E

- Interactive map of Bourouba
- Country: Algeria
- Province: Algiers

Population (1998)
  - Total: 77,500
- Time zone: UTC+1 (West Africa Time)

Bourouba is a suburb of the city of Algiers in northern Algeria.

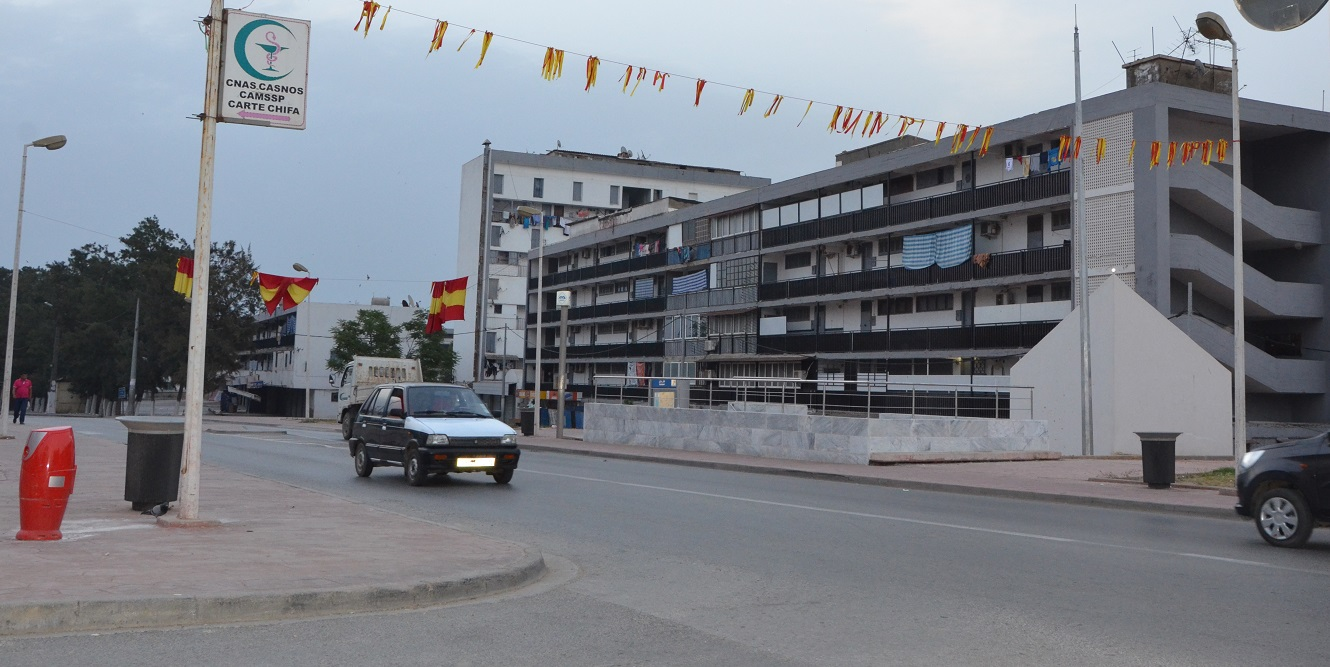
Bourouba
