= AS Banque de l'Habitat =

Association football women's club in Tunisia

- Full name: AS Banque de l'Habitat
- Nickname(s): Banque de l'Habitat
- Founded: 2005 (20 years ago)
- Ground: Tunisia
- Owner: BH Bank (Tunisia) formerly Banque de l'habitat
- President: (Tunisia) Noureddine Raddadi
- Head Coach: (Tunisia) ALi Jribi
- League: Tunisian Women's Championship
- 2022–23: —
Home colours	Away colours

AS Banque de l'Habitat (Arabic: الجمعية الرياضية لبنك الإسكان, lit. 'Association sportive de la Banque de l'habitat') is a football club based in Tunis, Tunisia and owned by the BH Bank (Tunisia) formerly Banque de l'habitat. The club is playing in the Tunisian Women's Championship, the top division in the Tunisia female football league system. They have won the championship on three occasions.

In July 2021, the club took part in the inaugural 2021 CAF Women's Champions League UNAF Qualifiers which was won by AS FAR.

== Current squad ==
Note: Flags indicate national team as defined under FIFA eligibility rules; some limited exceptions apply. Players may hold more than one non-FIFA nationality.

No.	Pos.	Nation	Player
—	GK		
—	DF	(Tunisia) TUN	Chaima Abbassi
—	DF	(Tunisia) TUN	Sana Yaakoubi
—	MF	(Tunisia) TUN	Soumaya Laamiri
—	MF	(Tunisia) TUN	Chaima Ben Mohamed
—	MF	(Tunisia) TUN	Eya Bellaaj
—	MF	(Tunisia) TUN	Soumaya Laamiri
—	MF	(Tunisia) TUN	Ibtissem Ben Mohamed
—	FW	(Tunisia) TUN	Rimel Abboud
—		(Tunisia) TUN	Nourhene Ayari
—		(Tunisia) TUN	Abir Sessi

No.	Pos.	Nation	Player
—	GK		
—	DF		
—	MF		
—	FW		

== Honours ==
=== Domestic ===
League titles

- Tunisian Women's Championship

Winners (4): 2010, 2018, 2019, 2022

Runners Up (3): 2008, 2017, 2021

- Tunisian Women's Cup

Winners (1): 2010

Runners Up (3): 2008, 2011, 2013

- Tunisian Women's League Cup (Coupe de la Ligue Féminine)

Winners (3): 2015, 2019, 2023

=== Regional ===
- UNAF Women's Club Tournament

Runners Up (1): 2021

Third Place (1): 2022

== Performance in CAF competitions ==
- CAF Women's Champions League: 2 appearance

2021 – UNAF qualifiers round
2022 – UNAF qualifiers round

== See also ==
- Tunisian Women's Championship
