= Amizour =

Amizour Amiẓuṛ (Kabyle)
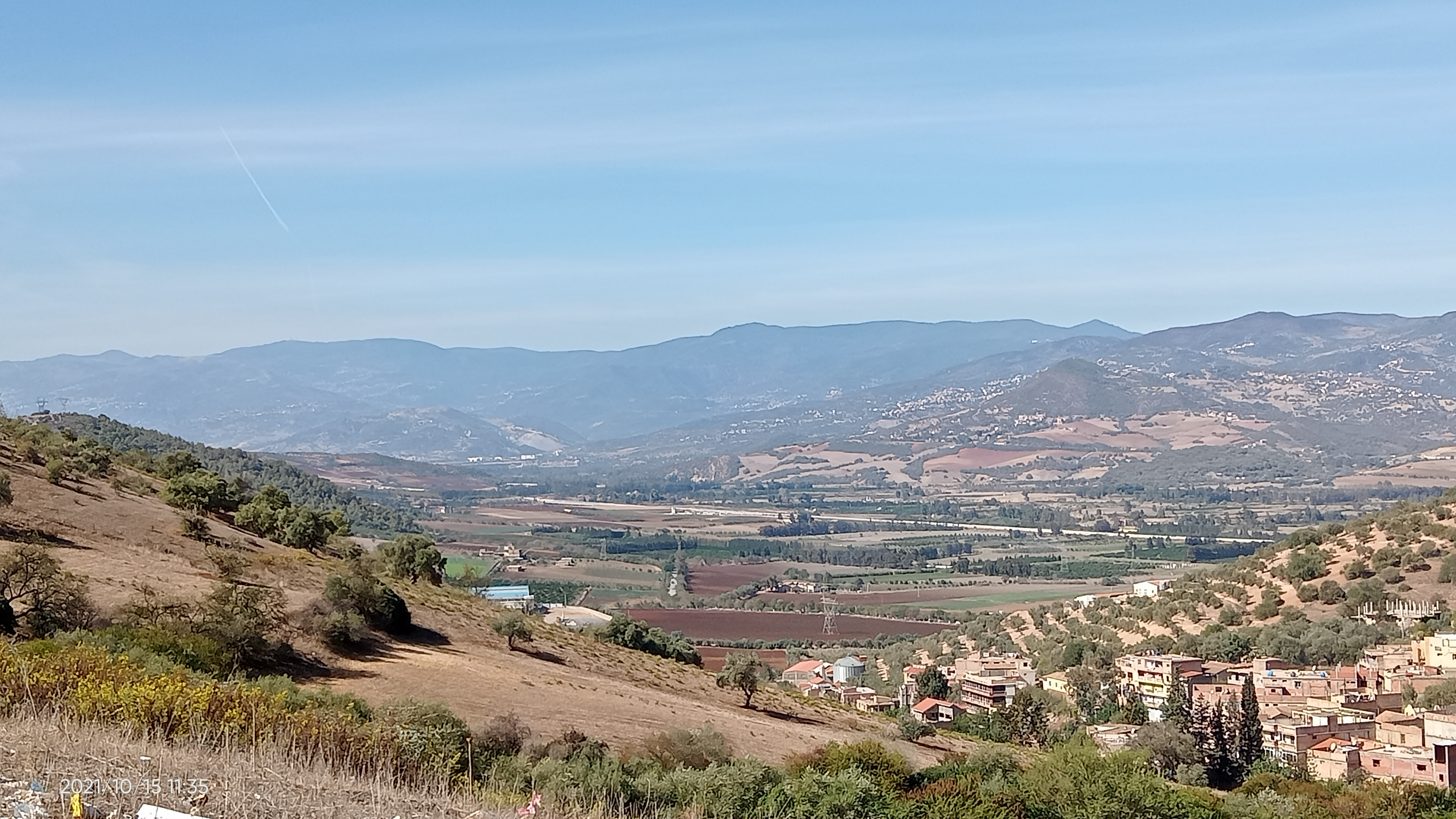

- Location within Algeria
- Coordinates: 36°38′N 4°55′E
- Country: Algeria
- Province: Bejaia
- Time zone: UTC+1 (West Africa Time)

Amizour (Kabyle: Amiẓuṛ) is a commune of northern Algeria located in the Béjaïa Province, in Kabylia.
