= Association Sportive Féminine de Sousse =

Association football women's club in Tunisia

Women's Sports Association of Sousse
- Full name: Women's Sports Association of Sousse
- Nickname: ASF sousse
- Founded: 1978 (48 years ago)
- Ground: Tunisia
- President: (Tunisia) Mounira El Aroui
- Head Coach: (Tunisia) Salah Kebaili
- League: Tunisian Women's Championship
- 2023: 2rd of 13
Home colours	Away colours

Women's Sports Association of Sousse (Arabic: الجمعية الرياضية النسائية بسوسة, lit. 'Association Sportive Féminine de Sousse') is a football club based in Sousse, Tunisia .

They have won the championship on one occasions.

== Current squad ==
Note: Flags indicate national team as defined under FIFA eligibility rules; some limited exceptions apply. Players may hold more than one non-FIFA nationality.

No.	Pos.	Nation	Player
—	GK		
—	DF	TUN	
—	DF	TUN	
—	MF	TUN	
—	MF	TUN	
—	MF	TUN	
—	MF	TUN	
—	MF	TUN	
—	FW	TUN	
—		TUN	
—		TUN	

No.	Pos.	Nation	Player
—	GK		
—	DF		
—	MF		
—	FW		

== Honours ==
=== Domestic ===
League titles

- Tunisian Women's Championship

Winners (2): 2021, 2023

- Tunisian Women's Cup

Winners (1): 2023

- National Union of Tunisian Women Cup (Coupe de l'Union nationale de la femme tunisienne)

Winners (1): 2017

== Performance in CAF competitions ==
- CAF Women's Champions League: 0 appearance

== See also ==
- Tunisian Women's Championship
