= Algerian Women's Championship =

Elite National Championship
- Logo of the LNFF
- Organising body: LNFF (FAF)
- Founded: 1998; 28 years ago
- Country: Algeria
- Confederation: CAF
- Number of clubs: 10
- Level on pyramid: 1
- Relegation to: National Championship D2
- Domestic cup(s): Algerian W-Cup; Algerian W-Super Cup
- League cup: Algerian W-League Cup
- International cup(s): UNAF W-Club Tournament; CAF W-Champions League
- Current champions: CF Akbou (3rd title) (2025-26)
- Most championships: Afak Relizane (11 titles)
- Broadcaster: EPTV
- Website: lnff.dz
- Current: 2026–27 Elite National Champ.

The Algerian Women's Championship (Arabic: البطولة الجزائرية للسيدات) known as Elite National Championship is the top flight of women's association football in Algeria. It is the women's equivalent of the Ligue 1, but is not professional. The competition is run by the Ligue Nationale du Football Féminin under the auspices of the Algerian Football Federation.

== History ==
=== Colonial era (1921-1962) ===
The first women's football match in Algeria took place on 8 May 1921, during the Algiers exhibition. This match pitted the women's sections of the two oldest clubs, AS Alger of the capital Algiers and Gallia Club of Oran of the second city Oran, against each other.

=== Emergence of women's football after independence (1962-1990) ===
The first women's football clubs appeared in Algeria after the country's independence in the 1970s, particularly in Tiaret. In 1975, the National Union of Algerian Youth (UNJA) was created, which organized several activities in all the wilayas of Algeria, including scouting, music, etc.

In the city of Tiaret, Mohamed Bensaïd, a member of the UNJA (National Union of Algerian Youth), along with other members, managed to gather a group of girls within the organization to form an inter-neighborhood league for women's football teams during the 1977-1978 season. The players, who were initially active in the UNJA, were primarily young women from the two high schools, Aflah and Ibn Rostom, in Tiaret. Within this mini-league, a team was created that played several friendly matches in Frenda, Algiers, and then Oran, including a match played on 8 March 1978, at the 5 July Stadium in Algiers, to mark International Women's Day, against a local team.

=== Appearance of clubs and the women's championship (1990-present) ===
The first Algerian women's championship was contested in 1998–1999 season under the regional leagues format. In the 2008–09 season, a national league of two divisions was created (D1 and D2) under the auspices of the Ligue Nationale du Football (LNF). In 2013, was created the Ligue du Football Féminin (LFF) which became the Ligue Nationale du Football Féminin (LNFF) and which is the body of the national women's championships.

The competition changed its name to Elite National Championship from the 2021–22 season.

== Format ==
The teams play a double round-robin. The season usually starts in October and lasts until June.

== Champions ==
The list of champions and runners-up:

Year	Champions	Runners-up
FAF Regional Leagues
1998–99	JS Kabylie	ASE Alger Centre
1999–00	ASE Alger Centre	Afak Relizane
2000–01	canceled	
2001–02	JS Kabylie	Afak Relizane
2002–03	ASE Alger Centre	Afak Relizane
2003–04	ASE Alger Centre	Afak Relizane
2004–05	ASE Alger Centre	AS Intissar Oran
2005–06	ASE Alger Centre	COS Tiaret
2006–07	ASE Alger Centre	JS Kabylie
2007–08	ASE Alger Centre	Afak Relizane
FAF National League
2008–09	ASE Alger Centre	Afak Relizane
2009–10	Afak Relizane	ASE Alger Centre
2010–11	Afak Relizane	ASE Alger Centre
2011–12	Afak Relizane	CLT Belouizdad
2012–13	Afak Relizane	ASE Alger Centre
LNFF National League
2013–14	Afak Relizane	ASE Alger Centre
2014–15	Afak Relizane	AS Sûreté Nationale
2015–16	Afak Relizane	FC Constantine
2016–17	Afak Relizane	AS Sûreté Nationale
2017–18	FC Constantine	AS Sûreté Nationale
2018–19	AS Sûreté Nationale	Afak Relizane
2019–20	JF Khroub	AS Sûreté Nationale
2020–21	Afak Relizane	AS Sûreté Nationale
2021–22	Afak Relizane	JF Khroub
2022–23	Afak Relizane	JF Khroub
2023–24	CF Akbou	JF Khroub
2024–25	CF Akbou	Afak Relizane
2025–26	CF Akbou	JS Kabylie
2026–27		

- CS Constantine (ex. FC Constantine)
- COTS Tiaret (ex. COS Tiaret)

== Most successful clubs ==
Rank	Club	Champions	Runners-up	Winning seasons	Runners-up seasons
1	Afak Relizane	11	8	2010, 2011, 2012, 2013, 2014, 2015, 2016, 2017, 2021, 2022, 2023	2000, 2002, 2003, 2004, 2008, 2009, 2019, 2025
2	ASE Alger Centre	8	5	2000, 2003, 2004, 2005, 2006, 2007, 2008, 2009	1999, 2010, 2011, 2013, 2014
3	CF Akbou	3	0	2024, 2025, 2026	
4	JS Kabylie	2	2	1999, 2002	2007, 2026
5	AS Sûreté Nationale	1	5	2019	2015, 2017, 2018, 2020, 2021
6	JF Khroub	1	3	2020	2022, 2023, 2024
7	CS Constantine	1	1	2018	2016
8	AS Intissar Oran	0	1		2005
8	COTS Tiaret	0	1		2006
8	CLT Belouizdad	0	1		2012

== Top goalscorers ==
Season	Player	Team	Goals
2004-05	(Algeria) Djamila Marek	Alger Centre	33
2016-17	(Algeria) Djamila Marek	Alger Centre	36
2024-25	(Algeria) Ouassila Alouache	Akbou	30
2025-26	(Algeria) Khouloud Ournani	Akbou	50

== See also ==
- Algerian Women's Cup
- Algerian Women's League Cup
- Algerian Women's Super Cup
- Algerian Women's Championship D2
