= Tunisian Women's Championship =

- Organising body: LNFF
- Founded: 2004; 22 years ago
- Country: Tunisia
- Confederation: CAF (Africa)
- Number of clubs: 13 (2022–23)
- Level on pyramid: 1
- Relegation to: W-Championship D2
- Domestic cup(s): W-Cup; W-Super Cup
- League cup: W-League Cup
- International cup: CAF W-Champions League
- Current champions: ASF Sousse (3rd title) (2023–24)
- Most championships: ASF Sahel (6 titles)
- Website: ftf.org.tn
- Current: 2025-26 W-Championship

The Tunisian Women's Championship (Arabic: البطولة التونسية للسيدات) is the top flight of women's association football in Tunisia. It is the women's equivalent of the Ligue 1. The competition is run by the Ligue Nationale du Football Féminin (LNFF) under the auspices of the Tunisian Football Federation.

== History ==
The first Tunisian women's championship was contested in 2004–05 season.

== Champions ==
The list of champions and runners-up:

Years	Champions
2004–05	US Tunis
2005–06	ISSEPC Kef
2006–07	ISSEPC Kef
2007–08	ASF Sahel
2008–09	ASF Sahel
2009–10	AS Banque de l'Habitat
2010–11	Cancelled because of the Tunisian Revolution
2011–12	ASF Sahel
2012–13	ASF Sahel
2013–14	ASF Sahel
2014–15	Tunisair Club
2015–16	Tunisair Club
2016–17	ASF Sahel
2017–18	AS Banque de l'Habitat
2018–19	AS Banque de l'Habitat
2019–20	Abandoned because of the COVID-19 pandemic in Tunisia
2020–21	ASF Sousse
2021–22	AS Banque de l'Habitat
2022–23	ASF Sousse
2023–24	ASF Sousse
2024–25	ASF Sousse
2025–26	ASF Sousse

== Most successful clubs ==
Club	Ville	Titres	Années
ASF Sahel	Sousse	6	2007–08, 2008–09, 2011–12, 2012–13, 2014, 2013–14
ASF Sousse	Sousse	5	2020–21, 2022–23, 2023–24, 2024–25, 2025–26
AS Banque de l'Habitat	Tunis	4	2009–10, 2017–18, 2018–19, 2021–22
Tunis Air Club	Tunis	2	2014–15, 2015–16
ISSEPC Kef	El Kef	2	2005–06, 2006–07
US Tunis	Tunis	1	2004–05

== See also ==
- Tunisian Women's Cup
- Tunisian Women's Super Cup
- Tunisian Women's League Cup
- National Union of Tunisian Women Cup
