= 2026 African U-20 Women's World Cup qualification =

2026 African U-20 Women's World Cup Qualifying Tournament
Tournament details
- Dates: 9 May 2025 – 10 May 2026
- Teams: 38

Tournament statistics
- Matches played: 63
- Goals scored: 192 (3.05 per match)
- Top scorer(s): (Benin) Romaine Gandonou (14 goals)

The 2026 African U-20 Women's World Cup qualification was the 13th edition of the biennial African youth football competition organized by the Confederation of African Football (CAF) to determine which African women's under-20 national teams qualified for the FIFA U-20 Women's World Cup. Players born on or after 1 January 2006 were eligible to compete.

Four teams qualified for the 2026 FIFA U-20 Women's World Cup in Poland as the CAF representatives.

== Draw ==
The draw was held on 12 December 2024 at the CAF headquarters in Cairo, Egypt.

- First Round: The 12 lowest-ranked teams, based on previous U-20 Women's World Cup qualifiers performance, will contest in this round. The six winners will advance to join the 26 top-ranked teams exempted from the first round.
- Second Round: The six first-round winners and 26 exempted teams will form 32 teams. These will battle it out for 16 spots in the third round.
- Third Round: The remaining 16 teams will compete in a knockout format to determine the eight teams advancing to the fourth round.
- Fourth Round: The final eight teams will play knockout ties, with the winners earning qualification to the 2026 FIFA U-20 Women's World Cup.

=== Entrants ===
A total of 38 (out of 54) CAF member associations registered teams for the competition. The teams were seeded based on their performance in the previous qualifying campaign. The four lowest-ranked teams, along with eight associations that did not participate in the previous edition, entered the first round, which featured six ties. The winners of these ties advanced to the second round.

- Algeria
- Angola
- Benin
- Burundi
- Botswana
- Cameroon
- Central African Republic
- Congo
- DR Congo
- Djibouti
- Egypt
- Equatorial Guinea
- Eswatini
- Ethiopia
- Gabon
- Gambia
- Ghana
- Guinea
- Guinea-Bissau
- Ivory Coast
- Kenya
- Morocco
- Malawi
- Mali
- Mozambique
- Namibia
- Nigeria
- Niger
- Rwanda
- Senegal
- South Africa
- South Sudan
- Tanzania
- Togo
- Tunisia
- Uganda
- Zambia
- Zimbabwe

Qualification rankings

Pos	Team	Pld	W	D	L	GF	GA	GD	Pts	Round reached
1	Ghana	6	6	0	0	21	2	+19	18	2024 FIFA U-20 Women's World Cup
2	Cameroon	6	5	1	0	17	6	+11	16	2024 FIFA U-20 Women's World Cup
3	Nigeria	6	5	1	0	11	2	+9	16	2024 FIFA U-20 Women's World Cup
4	Morocco	6	4	1	1	12	2	+10	13	2024 FIFA U-20 Women's World Cup
5	Ethiopia	6	4	1	1	12	4	+8	13	Fourth round
6	Egypt	6	3	2	1	28	6	+22	11	Fourth round
7	Senegal	6	2	2	2	5	8	−3	8	Fourth round
8	Burundi	6	1	2	3	5	7	−2	5	Fourth round
9	Tanzania	4	2	1	1	14	3	+11	7	Third round
10	Uganda	4	2	1	1	9	2	+7	7	Third round
11	Congo	4	2	1	1	6	8	−2	7	Third round
12	Kenya	4	2	0	2	12	7	+5	6	Third round
13	Guinea	4	2	0	2	10	5	+5	6	Third round
14	Eswatini	4	2	0	2	7	8	−1	6	Third round
15	DR Congo	4	1	2	1	5	5	0	5	Third round
16	Mali	4	1	0	3	2	8	−6	3	Third round
17	Algeria	2	1	0	1	2	2	0	3	Second round
18	South Africa	2	0	2	0	2	2	0	2	Second round
19	Zambia	2	0	2	0	2	2	0	2	Second round
20	Equatorial Guinea	2	0	1	1	2	5	−3	1	Second round
21	Burkina Faso	2	0	1	1	1	5	−4	1	Second round
22	Benin	2	0	1	1	0	2	−2	1	Second round
23	Namibia	2	0	0	2	1	5	−4	0	Second round
24	Botswana	2	0	0	2	1	6	−5	0	Second round
25	Guinea-Bissau	2	0	0	2	0	6	−6	0	Second round
26	Mozambique	2	0	0	2	0	8	−8	0	Second round
27	Angola	2	0	0	2	1	10	−9	0	Second round
28	Niger	2	0	0	2	0	10	−10	0	Second round
29	Djibouti	2	0	0	2	0	12	−12	0	Second round
30	São Tomé and Príncipe	2	0	0	2	0	18	−18	0	Second round
31	Gabon	2	0	0	2	0	6	−6	0	Forfeited the tie
31	Mauritius	2	0	0	2	0	6	−6	0	Forfeited the tie
33	Togo	2	0	0	2	1	6	−5	0	First round
34	Chad	2	0	0	2	0	6	−6	0	Forfeited the tie
34	Libya	2	0	0	2	0	6	−6	0	Forfeited the tie

Source: CAF

=== Draw pots ===
The teams were seeded into pots based on geographical distribution, with UNAF, UNIFFAC and WAFU placed in one pot and CECAFA and COSAFA in the other. Ties were drawn between teams from the same pot to minimize travel costs.

First round

Pot 1 (WAFU, UNAF & UNIFFAC)	Pot 2 (COSAFA, CECAFA & UNIFFAC)
Tunisia; Gambia; Togo; Ivory Coast; Niger; Gabon	Rwanda; Djibouti; South Sudan; Central African Republic; Malawi; Zimbabwe

Second round

Pot 1 (CECAFA and COSAFA)		Pot 2 (UNAF, UNIFFAC and WAFU)	
Eswatini; South Africa; Botswana; Angola; Burundi; Kenya	Zambia; Namibia; Mozambique; Ethiopia; Uganda; Tanzania	Egypt; Senegal; Mali; Benin; DR Congo	Algeria; Guinea; Guinea-Bissau; Congo; Equatorial Guinea

=== Did not enter ===
The following associations have previously fielded or currently field a women's under-20 team but chose not to participate:

- Burkina Faso
- Chad (Note: The country previously registered for the African qualifiers in this category but has not yet played an international match.)
- Comoros
- Eritrea
- Lesotho
- Liberia
- Libya
- Madagascar
- Mauritania
- Mauritius
- São Tomé and Príncipe
- Sierra Leone

The following associations have never fielded a women's under-20 team and did not participate:

- Cape Verde
- Somalia
- Sudan
- Seychelles

== Format ==
Qualification ties were played on a home-and-away two-legged basis. If the aggregate score was tied after the second leg, the away goals rule would be applied, and if still tied, the penalty shoot-out (no extra time) would be used to determine the winner.

== Schedule ==
Round	Leg	Date
First round	First leg	9–11 May 2025
First round	Second leg	16–18 May 2025
Second round	First leg	19–21 September 2025
Second round	Second leg	26–28 September 2025
Third round	First leg	6–8 February 2026
Third round	Second leg	12–14 February 2026
Fourth round	First leg	1–3 May 2026
Fourth round	Second leg	8–10 May 2026

== Bracket ==
The four winners of the fourth round would qualify for the 2026 FIFA U-20 Women's World Cup.

Second round
Niger	0	0	0
Cameroon	9	9	18
Botswana	2	1	3
Mozambique	0	1	1
Ethiopia	1	0	1
Kenya	1	4	5
Tanzania	4	3	7
Angola	0	0	0

Third round
Cameroon	5	0	5
Botswana	0	1	1
Kenya	1	0	1 (1)
Tanzania (p)	0	1	1 (3)

Fourth round
Cameroon	3	0	3
Tanzania	1	2	3

Second round
Tunisia	0	0	0
Ghana	2	2	4
Eswatini	0	0	0
South Africa	5	4	9
Uganda	3	2	5
Namibia	0	0	0
Burundi	1	0	1
Zambia	2	2	4

Third round
Ghana	2	1	3
South Africa	2	0	2
Uganda	1	1	2
Zambia	1	0	1

Fourth round
Ghana	2	1	3
Uganda	1	1	2

Second round
Ivory Coast	3	3	6
Morocco	1	3	4
Mali	1	—
DR Congo	1	—	w/o
Equatorial Guinea	1	0	1
Egypt	0	3	3
Benin	5	4	9
Guinea	1	3	4

Third round
Ivory Coast	2	0	2
DR Congo	0	1	1
Egypt	0	0	0
Benin	1	4	5

Fourth round
Ivory Coast	1	1	2
Benin	1	4	5

Second round
Rwanda	0	0	0
Nigeria	1	4	5
Senegal	2	4	6
Algeria	0	0	0
Guinea-Bissau	—	—	w/o
Congo	—	—
South Sudan	0	1	1
Malawi	2	1	3

Third round
Nigeria	1	2	3
Senegal	0	1	1
Guinea-Bissau	1	1	2
Malawi	1	5	6

Fourth round
Nigeria	2	1	3
Malawi	0	2	2

== First round ==
Team 1	Agg.	Team 2	1st leg	2nd leg
Gabon	w/o (Note: Niger won on a walkover and advanced to the second round after FEGAFOOT withdrew its women's under-20 team without giving any clarification on the reason.)	Niger	—	—
Togo	1–2	Tunisia	1–1	0–1
Gambia	0–6	Ivory Coast	0–1	0–5
Rwanda	2–1	Zimbabwe	2–1	0–0
South Sudan	13–0	Djibouti	5–0	8–0
Malawi	4–2	Central African Republic	3–1	1–1

11 May 2025
16:00 UTC+0

Togo	1–1	Tunisia
Aawi 45'	Report	Zerelli 31'

Stade de Kégué, Lomé
Referee: Suavis Iratunga (Burundi)
18 May 2025
16:00 UTC+1

Tunisia	1–0	Togo
Ajroud 12'	Report

Taieb Mhiri Stadium, Sfax
Referee: Rachel Zihindula (DR Congo)

Tunisia won 2–1 on aggregate.

9 May 2025
15:00 UTC+0

Gambia	0–1	Ivory Coast
	Report	Bah 65'

Independence Stadium, Bakau
Referee: Eness Gumbo (Malawi)
18 May 2025
17:00 UTC+0

Ivory Coast	5–0	Gambia
Timité 4'; N. N'Guessan 28', 33'; N'Dri 45'; Chyle 78'	Report

Alassane Ouattara Stadium, Abidjan
Referee: Sabah Sadir (Morocco)

Ivory Coast won 6–0 on aggregate.

11 May 2025
15:00 UTC+2

Rwanda	2–1	Zimbabwe
Ishmwe 3'; Gikundiro 50'	Report	Kondo 18'

Kigali Pelé Stadium, Kigali
Referee: Patience Madu Ndidi (Nigeria)
14 May 2025
15:00 UTC+2

Zimbabwe	0–0	Rwanda
	Report

Kigali Pelé Stadium, Kigali (Rwanda)
Referee: Innocentia Ntangti (Cameroon)

Rwanda won 2–1 on aggregate.

11 May 2025
15:00 UTC+3

South Sudan	5–0	Djibouti
Maika 1'; Joan 34'; Makuach 45+3', 57'; Nakuma 70'	Report

Juba Stadium, Juba
Referee: Sylvina Garnett (Liberia)
16 May 2025
15:00 UTC+3

Djibouti	0–8	South Sudan
	Report	Madout 8', 12', 17'; Joseph 15'; Iga 19', 40', 70'; Makuach 82'

Juba Stadium, Juba (South Sudan)
Referee: Seonyatseng Tshephe (Botswana)

South Sudan won 13–0 on aggregate.

11 May 2025
15:00 UTC+2

Malawi	3–1	Central African Republic
Lali 1'; Mkwala 8'; Phikani 45+4'	Report	Passibi Sate 76'

Bingu National Stadium, Lilongwe
Referee: Tatu Malogo (Tanzania)
18 May 2025
15:00 UTC+2

Central African Republic	1–1	Malawi
Daoud 11'	Report	Chinyamula 47'

Japoma Stadium, Douala (Cameroon)

Malawi won 4–2 on aggregate.

== Second round ==
Team 1	Agg.	Team 2	1st leg	2nd leg
Niger	0–18	Cameroon	0–9	0–9
Botswana	3–1	Mozambique	2–0	1–1
Ethiopia	1–5	Kenya	1–1	0–4
Tanzania	7–0	Angola	4–0	3–0
Tunisia	0–4	Ghana	0–2	0–2
Eswatini	0–9	South Africa	0–5	0–4
Uganda	5–0	Namibia	3–0	2–0
Burundi	1–4	Zambia	1–2	0–2
Ivory Coast	6–4	Morocco	3–1	3–3
Mali	w/o	DR Congo	1–1	— (Note: The second leg was cancelled after the Malian Football Federation withdrew from the competition due to organizational and logistical difficulties.)
Equatorial Guinea	1–3	Egypt	1–0	0–3
Benin	9–4	Guinea	5–1	4–3
Rwanda	0–5	Nigeria	0–1	0–4
Senegal	6–0	Algeria	2–0	4–0
Guinea-Bissau	w/o	Congo	—	—
South Sudan	1–3	Malawi	0–2	1–1

20 September 2025
16:00 UTC+1

Niger	0–9	Cameroon
	Report	Mekoua 2'; Nimpa 35', 64', 82'; Effa 38'; Nyadjou 42' (pen.); Ngon Biyo 47'; Tsimi 67'; Bibene 84'

Stade Général Seyni Kountché, Niamey
Referee: Bouchra Karboubi (Morocco)
27 September 2025
16:00 UTC+1

Cameroon	9–0	Niger
Son Mouen 6', 16'; Mekoua 12'; Nyadjou 20', 48'; Nimpa 34', 35'; Ngon Biyo 65'; Tsimi 86'	Report

Ahmadou Ahidjo Stadium, Yaoundé
Referee: Aïssata Lam (Mauritania)

Cameroon won 18–0 on aggregate.

19 September 2025
15:00 UTC+2

Botswana	2–0	Mozambique
Anonymous 14' (o.g.); Modumo 24'	Report

Lobatse Sports Complex, Lobatse
Referee: Khadmallah Elshayeb (Sudan)
28 September 2025
15:00 UTC+2

Mozambique	1–1	Botswana
Beatriz 16'	Report	Serokane 13'

Campo ABB Stadium, Matola
Referee: Laeticia Kenga (Central African Rep.)

Botswana won 3–1 on aggregate.

21 September 2025
15:00 UTC+3

Ethiopia	1–1	Kenya
Daniel 66'	Report	Mideva 1'

Abebe Bikila Stadium, Addis Ababa
Referee: Vistoria Shangula (Namibia)
28 September 2025
15:00 UTC+3

Kenya	4–0	Ethiopia
Nekesa 4'; Mideva 16', 67'; Adhiambo 28'	Report

Ulinzi Sports Complex, Nairobi

Kenya won 5–1 on aggregate.

21 September 2025
16:00 UTC+3

Tanzania	4–0	Angola
Gerald 20', 29'; Ubamba 77', 90+4'	Report

Azam Complex Stadium, Dar es Salaam
27 September 2025
16:00 UTC+1

Angola	0–3	Tanzania
	Report	Gerald 31'; Ramadhani 64'; Kinega 89'

Estádio 22 de Junho, Luanda
Referee: Aïcha Bit Oumarou (Chad)

Tanzania won 7–0 on aggregate.

20 September 2025
16:00 UTC+1

Tunisia	0–2	Ghana
	Report	Attobrah 4', 66'

Taieb Mhiri Stadium, Sfax
Referee: Aida Sy (Senegal)
28 September 2025
15:30 UTC+0

Ghana	2–0	Tunisia
Attobrah 37'; Yeboah 46'	Report

Accra Sports Stadium, Accra
Referee: Shamirah Nabadda (Uganda)

Ghana won 4–0 on aggregate.

19 September 2025
15:00 UTC+2

Eswatini	0–5	South Africa
	Report	Mokoma 24', 34'; Maicane 62'; Mohale 78'; October 90+1'

Somhlolo National Stadium, Lobamba
Referee: Sisay Raya (Ethiopia)
27 September 2025
15:00 UTC+2

South Africa	4–0	Eswatini
Maicane 8', 13'; Malebana 46'; Khoza 58'	Report

Mbombela Stadium, Mbombela

South Africa won 9–0 on aggregate.

19 September 2025
16:00 UTC+3

Uganda	3–0	Namibia
Kabene 47'; Anomo 82'; Kantono 90+1'	Report

FUFA Kadiba Stadium, Kampala
Referee: Rachel Zihindula (DR Congo)
22 September 2025
16:00 UTC+3

Namibia	0–2	Uganda
	Report	Muduwa 32'; Nabukenya 40'

FUFA Kadiba Stadium, Kampala (Uganda)
Referee: Yemisi Akintoye (Nigeria)

Uganda won 5–0 on aggregate.

19 September 2025
15:00 UTC+2

Burundi	1–2	Zambia
Bizimana 63'	Report	Mfunte 44'; Muwowo 88'

Intwari Stadium, Bujumbura
Referee: Dorsaf Ganouati (Tunisia)
27 September 2025
15:00 UTC+2

Zambia	2–0	Burundi
E. Phiri 9'; Chipasula 43'	Report

Nkoloma Stadium, Lusaka
Referee: Richy Nganda (Gabon)

Zambia won 4–1 on aggregate.

21 September 2025
15:00 UTC+0

Ivory Coast	3–1	Morocco
Ouédraogo 30', 66'; N. N'guessan 32'	Report	Balkhir 51'

Felix Houphouet Boigny Stadium, Abidjan
Referee: Aïssatou Kanté (Guinea)
28 September 2025
19:00 UTC+1

Morocco	3–3	Ivory Coast
Balkhir 58' (pen.), 90+6'; Houmaid 90+1'	Report	N. N'Guessan 41' (pen.); Ouédraogo 43', 85'

Rabat Olympic Stadium, Rabat
Referee: Alphonsine Ilboudo (Brukina Faso)

Ivory Coast won 6–4 on aggregate.

20 September 2025
16:00 UTC+0

Mali	1–1	DR Congo
Diabaté 30'	Report	Mukubayi 66'

Stade Mamadou Konaté, Bamako
Referee: Shahenda El Maghrabi (Egypt)
28 September 2025
15:00 UTC+1

DR Congo	Cancelled	Mali
	Report

Stade des Martyrs, Kinshasa

DR Congo won on walkover and advanced to the third round after Mali withdrew prior to the second leg following a 1–1 draw in the first leg.

19 September 2025
15:00 UTC+1

Equatorial Guinea	1–0	Egypt
Shalma Midje 9'	Report

Estadio de Malabo, Malabo
Referee: Henriette Byukusenge (Rwanda)
26 September 2025
19:00 UTC+2

Egypt	3–0	Equatorial Guinea
Habiba Essam 12', 37'; Habiba Biktash 90+4'	Report

Egyptian Air Defense Stadium, Cairo
Referee: Nonjabulo Nonhle Ndlela (South Africa)

Egypt won 3–1 on aggregate.

19 September 2025
19:00 UTC+0

Benin	5–1	Guinea
Gandonou 9', 28', 58', 86'; Titibi 13'	Report	Soumah 4'

Stade de Kégué, Lomé (Togo)
Referee: Innocentia Ntangti (Cameroon)
26 September 2025
17:00 UTC+0

Guinea	3–4	Benin
Yattara 18'; Abikou 48' (o.g.); Kouyaté 90'	Report	Gandonou 11', 14', 25'; Djibril 45+5'

Stade Mamadou Konaté, Bamako (Mali)
Referee: Cacilda Fernando (Mozambique)

Benin won 9–4 on aggregate.

21 September 2025
15:00 UTC+2

Rwanda	0–1	Nigeria
	Report; Report (NFF)	Olabiyi 70'

Kigali Pelé Stadium, Kigali
Referee: Aminata Fullah (Sierra Leone)
27 September 2025
16:00 UTC+1

Nigeria	4–0	Rwanda
Oscar 13'; Adeshina 20'; Akekoromwei 60'; Afolabi 90+1'	Report

Lekan Salami Stadium, Ibadan
Referee: Fatou Ngum (Gambia)

Nigeria won 5–0 on aggregate.

20 September 2025
20:00 UTC+0

Senegal	2–0	Algeria
Sarr 5'; Badio 9'	Report; Report (FSF)

Stade Lat-Dior, Thiès
Referee: Mercy Mayimbo (Zimbabwe)
27 September 2025
20:00 UTC+1

Algeria	0–4	Senegal
	Report; Report (FSF)	Pène 2' (pen.); Rekibi 18' (o.g.); Sagna 79'; Badio 81'

Mustapha Tchaker Stadium, Blida
Referee: Rita Boateng-Nkansah (Ghana)

Senegal won 6–0 on aggregate.

20 September 2025
16:00 UTC+0

Guinea-Bissau	Cancelled	Congo
	Report

Estádio 24 de Setembro, Bissau
Referee: Zouwaira Souley Sani (Niger)
28 September 2025
15:30 UTC+1

Congo	Cancelled	Guinea-Bissau
	Report

Stade Alphonse Massemba-Débat, Brazzaville

Guinea-Bissau won on walkover and advanced to the third round after Congo withdrew prior to the first leg without giving any clarification on the reason.

23 September 2025
16:00 UTC+3

South Sudan	0–2	Malawi
	Report	Fabiano 34'; Mulimbika 64'

Juba Stadium, Juba
Referee: Vincentia Amedome (Togo)
26 September 2025
16:00 UTC+3

Malawi	1–1	South Sudan
Fabiano 46'	Report	Makuach 33'

Juba Stadium, Juba (South Sudan)
Referee: Asma Chouchane (Tunisia)

Malawi won 3–1 on aggregate.

== Third round ==
Team 1	Agg.	Team 2	1st leg	2nd leg
Cameroon	5–1	Botswana	5–0	0–1
Kenya	1–1 (1–3 p)	Tanzania	1–0	0–1
Ghana	3–2	South Africa	2–2	1–0
Uganda	2–1	Zambia	1–1	1–0
Ivory Coast	2–1	DR Congo	2–0	0–1
Egypt	0–5	Benin	0–1	0–4
Nigeria	3–1	Senegal	1–0	2–1
Guinea-Bissau	2–6	Malawi	1–1	1–5

7 February 2026
16:00 UTC+1

Cameroon	5–0	Botswana
Effa 18' (pen.); Nimpa 30'; Mekoua 50'; Tsimi 68' (pen.); Ngo Bilong 74'	Report

Olembe Stadium, Yaoundé
Referee: Yacine Samassa (Mauritania)
13 February 2026
15:00 UTC+2

Botswana	1–0	Cameroon
Hangara 77'	Report

Obed Itani Chilume Stadium, Francistown
Referee: Yemisi Akintoye (Nigeria)

Cameroon won 5–1 on aggregate.

7 February 2026
15:00 UTC+3

Kenya	1–0	Tanzania
Mideva 84'	Report

Ulinzi Sports Complex, Nairobi
Referee: Vistoria Shangula (Namibia)
14 February 2026
16:00 UTC+3

Tanzania	1–0	Kenya
Gerald 70' (pen.)	Report
Penalties
Penalty scored Penalty missed	3–1	Penalty missed Penalty scored

Azam Complex Stadium, Dar es Salaam

1–1 on aggregate. Tanzania won 3–1 on penalties.

8 February 2026
15:30 UTC+1

Ghana	2–2	South Africa
A. Yeboah 33'; Owusu Ansah 52'	Report	October 47'; Khoza 60'

Accra Sports Stadium, Accra
Referee: Asma Chouchane (Tunisia)
14 February 2026
15:00 UTC+2

South Africa	0–1	Ghana
	Report	Mensah 63'

Mbombela Stadium, Mbombela
Referee: Fatou Ngum (Gambia)

Ghana won 3–2 on aggregate.

7 February 2026
16:00 UTC+3

Uganda	1–1	Zambia
Nabukenya 23'	Report	E. Phiri 59'

FUFA Stadium Kadiba, Kampala
Referee: Innocentia Ntangti (Cameroon)
14 February 2026
15:00 UTC+2

Zambia	0–1	Uganda
	Report	Kantono 7'

Nkoloma Stadium, Lusaka
Referee: Mariétou Fall (Senegal)

Uganda won 2–1 on aggregate.

8 February 2026
17:00 UTC+0

Ivory Coast	2–0	DR Congo
R. N'Guessan 34'; Djan 68'	Report

Felix Houphouet Boigny Stadium, Abidjan
Referee: Thanks Nyahuye (Zimbabwe)
14 February 2026
16:00 UTC+1

DR Congo	1–0	Ivory Coast
Kalumba 49'	Report

Stade Frederic Kibassa Maliba, Lubumbashi
Referee: Sisay Raya (Ethiopia)

Ivory Coast won 2–1 on aggregate.

6 February 2026
14:30 UTC+2

Egypt	0–1	Benin
	Report	Gandonou 68'

30 June Stadium Annex 2, Cairo
Referee: Dominique Hanjavola (Madagascar)
13 February 2026
16:00 UTC+0

Benin	4–0	Egypt
Djibril 45+3'; Gandonou 51', 61', 78'	Report

Kégué Stadium, Lomé (Togo)
Referee: Agnes Ngoma (Congo)

Benin won 5–0 on aggregate.

7 February 2026
16:00 UTC+1

Nigeria	1–0	Senegal
Ifeanyi 50'	Report

MKO Abiola Stadium, Abeokuta
Referee: Diana Murungi (Uganda)
14 February 2026
17:00 UTC+0

Senegal	1–2	Nigeria
Pène 76'	Report	Ifeanyi 19'; Oscar 68'

Stade Lat-Dior, Thiès
Referee: Zakia El Grini (Morocco)

Nigeria won 3–1 on aggregate.

7 February 2026
16:00 UTC+0

Guinea-Bissau	1–1	Malawi
Q. da Silva 48'	Report	Mulimbika 75'

24th of September Stadium, Bissau
Referee: Zouwaira Souley Sani (Niger)
14 February 2026
14:30 UTC+2

Malawi	5–1	Guinea-Bissau
Milanzi 5'; Mkwala 54'; Lali 71', 90+3'; Mkandawire 83'	Report	Bari 2'

Bingu National Stadium, Lilongwe
Referee: Emmanuela Clement (South Sudan)

Malawi won 6–2 on aggregate.

== Fourth round ==
Team 1	Agg.	Team 2	1st leg	2nd leg
Cameroon	3–3 (a)	Tanzania	3–1	0–2
Ghana	3–2	Uganda	2–1	1–1
Ivory Coast	2–5	Benin	1–1	1–4
Nigeria	3–2	Malawi	2–0	1–2

2 May 2026
17:00 UTC+1

Cameroon	3–1	Tanzania
Nyadjou 36', 50' (pen.); Meva 45+3'	Report; Report (TFF)	Gerald 17'

Ahmadou Ahidjo Stadium, Yaoundé
Referee: Ghada Mehat (Algeria)
10 May 2026
16:30 UTC+3

Tanzania	2–0	Cameroon
Siyame 6'; Ubamba 74' (pen.)	Report

Amaan Stadium, Zanzibar

3–3 on aggregate. Tanzania won on away goals.

3 May 2026
15:30 UTC+0

Ghana	2–1	Uganda
Mensah 56'; Abesik 85'	Report (GFA); Report (FUFA)	Nabukenya 32'

Accra Sports Stadium, Accra
Referee: Aline Guimbang Etong (Cameroon)
9 May 2026
16:00 UTC+3

Uganda	1–1	Ghana
Kabene 6'	Report	Owusu Ansah 78'

FUFA Stadium Kadiba, Kampala
Referee: Akhona Makalima (South Africa)

Ghana won 3–2 on aggregate.

2 May 2026
17:00 UTC+0

Ivory Coast	1–1	Benin
N. N'Guessan 29'	Report	Gandonou 37'

Alassane Ouattara Stadium, Abidjan
Referee: Antsino Twanyanyukwa (Namibia)
10 May 2026
15:00 UTC+0

Benin	4–1	Ivory Coast
Soukou 15'; Gandonou 34', 69'; Honfo 45+1'	Report	N'Dri 52'

Stade de Kégué, Lomé (Togo)
Referee: Shamirah Nabadda (Uganda)

Benin won 5–2 on aggregate.

2 May 2026
16:00 UTC+1

Nigeria	2–0	Malawi
Kenneth 46' (o.g.); Ifeanyi 57'	Report (NFF); Report (FAM)

Remo Stars Stadium, Ikenne
Referee: Shahenda El Maghrabi (Egypt)
9 May 2026
15:00 UTC+2

Malawi	2–1	Nigeria
Chinzimu 9', 55'	Report	Oscar 61'

Bingu National Stadium, Lilongwe
Referee: Josephine Wanjiku (Kenya)

Nigeria won 3–2 on aggregate.

== Qualified teams for FIFA U-20 Women's World Cup ==
The following four teams from CAF qualified for the 2026 FIFA U-20 Women's World Cup in Poland.

Team	Qualified on	Previous appearances in FIFA U-20 Women's World Cup^{1}
Ghana	9 May 2026	7 (2010, 2012, 2014, 2016, 2018, 2022, 2024)
Nigeria	9 May 2026	11 (2002, 2004, 2006, 2008, 2010, 2012, 2014, 2016, 2018, 2022, 2024)
Tanzania	10 May 2026	0 (debut)
Benin	10 May 2026	0 (debut)

^{1} Bold indicates champions for that year. Italic indicates hosts for that year.

== Goalscorers ==
There were 192 goals scored in 63 matches, for an average of 3.05 goals per match.

14 goals

- (Benin) Romaine Gandonou

6 goals

- (Cameroon) Beverly Nimpa

5 goals

- (Cameroon) Maëva Nyadjou
- (Ivory Coast) Nadège N'Guessan
- (Tanzania) Winfrida Gerald

4 goals

- (Ivory Coast) N'Sira Ouédraogo
- (Kenya) Elizabeth Mideva
- (South Sudan) Nyamam Makuach

3 goals

- (Cameroon) Rachou Mekoua
- (Cameroon) Aurore Tsimi
- (Ghana) Mercy Attobrah
- (Malawi) Fatima Lali
- (Morocco) Hajar Balkhir
- (Nigeria) Kindness Ifeanyi
- (Nigeria) Precious Oscar
- (South Africa) Mavis Maicane
- (South Sudan) Kayungu Iga
- (South Sudan) Anyiet Madout
- (Tanzania) Hasnath Ubamba
- (Uganda) Agnes Nabukenya

2 goals

- (Benin) Yasminath Djibril
- (Cameroon) Dorothy Effa Essomba
- (Cameroon) Marie Ngon Biyo
- (Cameroon) Gloria Son Mouen
- (Egypt) Habiba Essam
- (Ghana) Priscilla Mensah
- (Ghana) Linda Owusu Ansah
- (Ghana) Agnes Yeboah
- (Ivory Coast) Grace N'Dri
- (Malawi) Faith Chinzimu
- (Malawi) Enelesi Fabiano
- (Malawi) Victoria Mkwala
- (Malawi) Sarah Mulimbika
- (Senegal) Khadija Badio
- (Senegal) Sokhna Pène
- (South Africa) Khwezi Khoza
- (South Africa) Bonolo Mokoma
- (South Africa) Zoe October
- (Uganda) Sylvia Kabene
- (Uganda) Mary Kantono
- (Zambia) Edith Phiri

1 goal

- (Benin) Germaine Honfo
- (Benin) Hosane Soukou
- (Benin) Auriane Titibi
- (Botswana) Mbapeua Hangara
- (Botswana) Rose Modumo
- (Botswana) Mmabatho Serokane
- (Burundi) Rukiya Bizimana
- (Cameroon) Loana Bibeme
- (Cameroon) Kiki Meva
- (Cameroon) Andree Ngo Bilong
- (Central African Republic) Maïmouna Daoud
- (Central African Republic) Sylviane Passibi
- (Democratic Republic of the Congo) Gracia Kalumba
- (Democratic Republic of the Congo) Catherine Mukubayi
- (Egypt) Habiba Biktash
- (Equatorial Guinea) Shalma Midje
- (Ethiopia) Emush Daniel
- (Ghana) Latifa Abesik
- (Guinea) Aïcha Kouyaté
- (Guinea) Mariama Soumah
- (Guinea) Mariama Yattara
- (Guinea-Bissau) Lamarana Bari
- (Guinea-Bissau) Quinta da Silva
- (Ivory Coast) Nahomie Bah
- (Ivory Coast) Priscille Chyle
- (Ivory Coast) Audrey Djan Lou
- (Ivory Coast) Rolande N'Guessan
- (Ivory Coast) Yasmine Timité
- (Kenya) Fasila Adhiambo
- (Kenya) Valerie Nekesa
- (Malawi) Leticia Chinyamula
- (Malawi) Alinafe Milanzi
- (Malawi) Mayamiko Mkandawire
- (Malawi) Olivia Phikani
- (Mali) Kadidiatou Diabaté
- (Morocco) Hafsa Houmaid
- (Mozambique) Beatriz Zaqueu
- (Nigeria) Fatimah Adeshina
- (Nigeria) Taiwo Afolabi
- (Nigeria) Janet Akekoromwei
- (Nigeria) Alaba Olabiyi
- (Rwanda) Scholastique Gikundiro
- (Rwanda) Darlene Ishmwe
- (Senegal) Aïssatou Sagna
- (Senegal) Marie-Louise Sarr
- (South Africa) Katleho Malebana
- (South Africa) Katlego Mohale
- (South Sudan) Monica Akio
- (South Sudan) Nancy Joseph
- (South Sudan) Ludia Justine
- (South Sudan) Adong Olwal
- (Tanzania) Neema Kinega
- (Tanzania) Asha Ramadhani
- (Tanzania) Mary Siyame
- (Togo) Abigail Aawi
- (Tunisia) Ranim Ajroud
- (Tunisia) Tesnim Zerelli
- (Uganda) Barbara Anomo
- (Uganda) Peace Muduwa
- (Zambia) Mercy Chipasula
- (Zambia) Chishala Mfunte
- (Zambia) Ruth Muwowo
- (Zimbabwe) Bethel Kondo

1 own goal

- (Algeria) Mélissa Rekibi (against Senegal)
- (Benin) Laura Abikou (against Guinea)
- (Malawi) Maureen Kenneth (against Nigeria)
- (Mozambique) Undefined (against Botswana)

== See also ==
- 2026 Women's Africa Cup of Nations
- 2025 African U-17 Women's World Cup qualification
- 2026 African U-17 Women's World Cup qualification
