= Adidja Nzeyimana =

Burundian footballer

Personal information
- Position: Goalkeeper

Team information
- Current team: PVP Buyenzi

Senior career*
Years	Team	Apps	(Gls)
- PVP Buyenzi

International career^{‡}
2021–	Burundi	2	(0)
- * Club domestic league appearances and goals ‡ National team caps and goals as of 21 February 2022.

Adidja Nzeyimana is a Burundian footballer who plays as a goalkeeper for PVP Buyenzi and Burundi women's national team.

== Club career ==
Nzeyimana has played for PVP Buyenzi in Burundi. She partook in the 2021 CAF Women's Champions League CECAFA Qualifiers between August 2021 and September 2021. She was the first choice goalkeeper during the competition.

== International career ==
Nzeyimana was part of the Burundi U20 squad in 2017. She was earned call ups into the squad for their 2018 African U-20 Women's World Cup Qualifying Tournament matches against South Africa. Nzeyimana kept the post in both their matches for the 2022 Africa Women Cup of Nations qualifiers of which they defeated Djibouti 11–1 on aggregate to qualify for their first Africa Women Cup of Nations.
