= Tanzania women's national under-20 football team =

National under-20 association football team

Tanzania Under-20
- Nickname: Twiga Stars
- Association: Tanzania Football Federation
- Confederation: CAF (Africa)
- Sub-confederation: CECAFA (East & Central Africa)
- Head coach: Bakari Shime
- FIFA code: TAN
First colours	Second colours	Third colours

African U-20 Women's World Cup qualification
- Appearances: 6 (first in 2014)
- Best result: Qualified for World Cup (2026)

FIFA U-20 Women's World Cup
- Appearances: 1 (first in 2026)
- Best result: Group stage (2026)

The Tanzania women's national under-20 football team represents Tanzania in international youth women's football competitions.

The team finished in 3rd place in the first edition of the CECAFA Women's U-20 Championship.

== Results and fixtures ==
The following is a list of match results in the last 12 months, as well as any future matches that have been scheduled.

Legend

Win Draw Loss Fixture

=== 2026 ===
7 February 2026 World Cup Q	Kenya	1–0	Tanzania	Nairobi
15:00 UTC+3	Mideva 84'	Report		Stadium: Ulinzi Sports Complex; Referee: Vistoria Shangula (Namibia)

14 February 2026 World Cup Q	Tanzania	1–0 (3–1 p)	Kenya	Dar es Salaam
16:00 UTC+3	Gerald 70' (pen.)	Report		Stadium: Azam Complex Stadium
	Penalties
	Penalty scored Penalty missed		Penalty missed Penalty scored

== Competitive record ==
Champions Runners-up Third place Fourth place

- Red border color indicates tournament was held on home soil.

=== FIFA U-20 Women's World Cup ===
FIFA U-20 Women's World Cup
Year	Result	Matches	Wins	Draws*	Losses	GF	GA	Squad
(Canada) 2002	Did not qualify							
(Thailand) 2004	Did not qualify							
(Russia) 2006	Did not qualify							
(Chile) 2008	Did not qualify							
(Germany) 2010	Did not qualify							
(Japan) 2012	Did not qualify							
(Canada) 2014	Did not qualify							
(Papua New Guinea) 2016	Did not qualify							
(France) 2018	Did not qualify							
(Costa Rica) 2022	Did not qualify							
(Colombia) 2024	Did not qualify							
(Poland) 2026	Group stage	3	0	0	3	2	15	Squad
Total:1/12	TBD	3	0	0	3	2	15	-

=== African U-20 Women's World Cup qualification ===
African U-20 Women's World Cup qualification
Appearances: 2
Year	Round	Pld	W	D	L	GF	GA
2002	Did not enter						
2004	Did not enter						
2006	Did not enter						
2008	Did not enter						
2010	Did not enter						
2012	Did not enter						
2014	Round 2	4	2	0	2	16	10
2015	Round 1	2	0	1	1	0	4
2018	Round 1	2	0	0	2	0	9
2020	Cancelled						
2022	Semi-finals	6	4	1	1	10	5
2024	To be determined						
Total	5/11	14	6	2	6	26	28

=== African Games ===
African Games record
Appearances: 1
Year	Round	Pld	W	D	L	GF	GA
(Morocco) 2019	Did not qualify						
(Ghana) 2023	Group stage	3	0	2	1	3	4
Total	1/2	3	0	2	1	3	4

== Head-to-head record ==
The following table shows Tanzania's head-to-head record in the FIFA U-20 Women's World Cup.

Opponent	Pld	W	D	L	GF	GA	GD	Win %
Brazil	1	0	0	1	1	4	−3	0.00
England	1	0	0	1	1	5	−4	0.00
Total	2	0	0	2	2	9	−7	0.00

== See also ==
- Tanzania women's national football team
