= Safi N'Sira =

Ivorian footballer (born 2008)

Personal information
- Full name: N'Sira Safi Ouédraogo
- Date of birth: 21 April 2008 (age 18)
- Height: 1.65 m (5 ft 5 in)
- Position: Forward

Team information
- Current team: Nordsjælland
- Number: 9

Youth career
- 2019–2026: Right to Dream Academy

Senior career*
Years	Team	Apps	(Gls)
2026–	Nordsjælland	12	(12)

International career
2025	Ivory Coast U17	1	(1)
2025	Ivory Coast U20	2	(4)
2026–	Ivory Coast	7	(3)
- * Club domestic league appearances and goals as of 22:56, 14 November 2026 (UTC)

N'Sira Safi Ouédraogo (French pronunciation: [ənsiʁa safi wedʁaoɡo]; born 21 April 2008) is an Ivorian professional footballer who plays as a forward for Danish A-Liga club Nordsjælland and the Côte d'Ivoire national team.

== Club career ==
N'Sira had a trial with Women's Super League club Chelsea in 2025. In April 2026, N'Sira joined Danish A-Liga side Nordsjælland, signing her first professional contract on a three-year deal until 2029. N'Sira made her debut for the team on 15 August 2026 in a 3–1 victory over ASA, scoring once and getting an assist after coming on from the bench as a substitute. In her first 180 minutes of playing time with FCN, N'Sira amassed 3 goals and 5 assists. N'Sira has by Danish media been dubbed the biggest talent to ever play in the Danish A-Liga.

N'Sira was awarded A-Liga Player of the Month for her September 2026 achievements in her first month with Nordsjælland.

== International career ==
=== Youth ===
In the 2026 African U-20 Women's World Cup qualification, N'Sira scored four goals in Ivory Coast's two-legged tie against Morocco, helping les Elephantes progress to the third round with a 6–4 aggregate win.

A month later, N'Sira was included in Ivory Coast's squad for its maiden appearance at the 2025 FIFA U-17 Women's World Cup. On 19 October 2025, she scored the nation's first and only goal of the tournament before sustaining an injury that ruled her out for the remainder of the competition.

=== Senior ===
At the age of 17, N'Sira received her first senior national team call-up from head coach Reynald Pedros in February 2026 for friendly matches against Kenya and Benin. Against the latter, she made her debut for les Elephantes on 28 February, starting the match. After missing the 2026 FIFA Series, she was recalled in June 2026 for friendlies against Cape Verde, scoring her first international goal in a 3–0 win in the first match.

N'Sira was selected for Ivory Coast's final squad for the 2026 Women's Africa Cup of Nations, where she was the youngest member of the team at 18 years and 96 days old. She went on to score two goals in the tournament, before getting a red card in the quarter-final against Algeria.

=== International goals ===
Scores and results list Ivory Coast's goal tally first, score column indicates score after each N'Sira goal.

No.	Date	Venue	Opponent	Score	Result	Competition	Ref.
1	5 June 2026	Felix Houphouet Boigny Stadium, Abidjan, Ivory Coast	Cape Verde	2–0	3–0	Friendly	
2	27 July 2026	Larbi Zaouli Stadium, Casablanca, Morocco	Burkina Faso	4–0	4–1	2026 Africa Cup of Nations	
3	4 August 2026	Larbi Zaouli Stadium, Casablanca, Morocco	Tanzania	1–0	2–1	2026 Africa Cup of Nations	
