= CECAFA Women's U-20 Championship =

Football competition

- Sport: Football
- Founded: 2021
- First season: 2021
- Most recent champion: Ethiopia

The CECAFA Women's U-20 Championship is a football (soccer) tournament in Africa. It is organised by the Council of East and Central Africa Football Associations (CECAFA), and includes women's national under 20 teams from Central and East Africa.

== History ==
The first edition was held in Uganda from 28 October to 9 November 2021.

== Results ==
Year	Host	Final			Third Place Match		
Year	Host	Winner	Score	Runner-up	3rd Place	Score	4th Place
2021; Details	Uganda	Ethiopia	Group stage	Uganda	Tanzania	Group stage	Burundi

=== 2021 ===
Pos	Team	Pld	W	D	L	GF	GA	GD	Pts	Final result	ETH	UGA	TAN	BDI	ERI	DJI
1	Ethiopia	5	5	0	0	18	3	+15	15	Champions	—	—	—	—	5–0	—
2	Uganda (H)	5	4	0	1	23	4	+19	12	Runners-up	2–3	—	1–0	5–1	—	13–0
3	Tanzania	5	3	0	2	13	5	+8	9	Third place	1–2	—	—	—	1–0	—
4	Burundi	5	2	0	3	11	10	+1	6		0–1	—	2–3	—	2–1	—
5	Eritrea	5	1	0	4	3	10	−7	3		—	0–2	—	—	—	2–0
6	Djibouti	5	0	0	5	0	36	−36	0		0–7	—	0–8	0–6	—	—

Source: CECAFA
Rules for classification: Group stage tiebreakers
(H) Hosts

== Participating nations ==
Legend

- 1st – Champions
- 2nd – Runners-up
- 3rd – Third place
- 4th – Fourth place
- SF – Losing semi-finals
- QF – Quarter-finals
- GS – Group stage
- Q — Qualified for upcoming tournament
- • – Did not qualify
- × – Withdrew
- – Hosts

Team	(Uganda) 2021	Years
Ethiopia	1st	1
Kenya		0
Tanzania	3rd	1
Uganda	2nd	1
Rwanda		0
Burundi	4th	1
Zanzibar		0
Sudan		0
Djibouti	6th	1
South Sudan		0
Eritrea	5th	1
Somalia		0
Total (12 Teams)	6	
