= Confederation of African Football =

International governing body of association football in Africa

- Abbreviation: CAF
- Founded: 8 February 1957; 69 years ago
- Founded at: Khartoum, Sudan
- Headquarters: 6th of October City, Giza, Egypt
- Coordinates: 29°59′39″N 30°57′48″E
- Region served: Africa
- Members: 54 member associations
- Official language: Arabic; English; French; Spanish; Swahili
- President: Patrice Motsepe
- Vice Presidents: Fouzi Lekjaa (first vice president); Kurt Okraku; Pierre-Alain Mounguengui; Bestine Ditabala; Feizal Sidat
- General Secretary: Samson Adamu
- Parent organisation: FIFA
- Subsidiaries: UNAF (North Africa); WAFU (West Africa); UNIFFAC (Central Africa); CECAFA (East Africa); COSAFA (Southern Africa)
- Website: www.cafonline.com

The Confederation of African Football (Note: French: Confédération Africaine de Football; Arabic: الاتحاد الإفريقي لكرة القدم, romanised: al-Ittiḥād al-Ifrīqī li-Kurat al-Qadam; Portuguese: Confederação Africana de Futebol; Spanish: Confederación Africana de Fútbol; Swahili: Shirikisho la Soka Afrika.) (CAF) is the governing body for association football, beach soccer, and futsal in Africa. It was officially established on 8 February 1957 at the Grand Hotel in Khartoum, Sudan and today comprises 54 member associations. The foundation followed a decision made at the 1954 FIFA Congress in Bern, Switzerland, where Africa was formally recognised as a football confederation.

Representing the African confederation of FIFA, CAF organises runs and regulates national team and club continental competitions annually or biennially such as the Africa Cup of Nations and Women's Africa Cup of Nations, which they control the prize money and broadcast rights to. CAF has been allocated 9 spots at the FIFA World Cup from 2026 with an opportunity of a 10th spots through an intercontinental play-off involving 6 teams to decide the last 2 FIFA World Cup places (46+2).

The headquarters of CAF were originally located within the offices of the Sudanese Football Association in Khartoum, before being relocated to a site near Cairo, Egypt, following a fire. Youssef Mohamad served as the organisation’s first general secretary, and Abdel Aziz Abdallah Salem was its first president. The current president, Patrice Motsepe of South Africa, was first elected unopposed on 12 March 2021 in elections held in Rabat, Morocco.

== Anthem ==
CAF launched a competition for all African composers to create its anthem without lyrics to reflect the cultural patrimony and the music of Africa on 18 September 2007.

== Leadership ==
Name	Position
(South Africa) Patrice Motsepe	President
(Morocco) Fouzi Lekjaa	1st Vice President
(Ghana) Kurt Okraku	2nd Vice President
(Gabon) Pierre-Alain Mounguengui	3rd Vice President
(Democratic Republic of the Congo) Bestine Ditabala	4th Vice President
(Mozambique) Feizal Sidat	5th Vice President
(Nigeria) Samson Adamu	General Secretary
(Ghana) Frederick Acheampong	General Coordinator

== Members and zones ==
A total of 54 member associations are part of the Confederation of African Football.

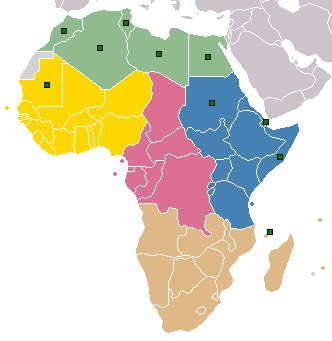
African regional federations UNAF (North Africa) WAFU (West Africa) UNIFFAC (Central Africa) CECAFA (East Africa) COSAFA (Southern Africa)

=== Members ===
Code	Association	National teams	Founded	FIFA affiliation	CAF affiliation	Regional affiliation	IOC member
Union of North African Football (UNAF) (5)
ALG	Algeria	Men's; U23; U20; U17; F; BS; Women's; W U20; W U17; F	1962	1964	1964	2005	Yes
EGY	Egypt (Note: Member of UNAF. Withdrew on 19 November 2009 and rejoined in 2011.)	Men's; U23; U20; U17; F; BS; Women's; W U20; W U17; F	1921	1923	1957	2005	Yes
LBY	Libya	Men's; U23; U20; U17; F; BS; Women's; W U20; W U17; F	1962	1964	1965	2005	Yes
MAR	Morocco	Men's; U23; U20; U17; F; BS; Women's; W U20; W U17; F	1955	1960	1960	2005	Yes
TUN	Tunisia	Men's; U23; U20; U17; F; BS; Women's; W U20; W U17; F	1957	1960	1960	2005	Yes
West African Football Union (WAFU) (16)
BEN	Benin	Men's; U23; U20; U17; F; BS; Women's; W U20; W U17; F	1962	1964	1963	1975	Yes
BFA	Burkina Faso	Men's; U23; U20; U17; F; BS; Women's; W U20; W U17; F	1960	1964	1964	1975	Yes
CPV	Cape Verde	Men's; U23; U20; U17; F; BS; Women's; W U20; W U17; F	1982	1986	1986	1975	Yes
GAM	Gambia	Men's; U23; U20; U17; F; BS; Women's; W U20; W U17; F	1952	1968	1966	1975	Yes
GHA	Ghana	Men's; U23; U20; U17; F; BS; Women's; W U20; W U17; F	1935	1948	1960	1975	Yes
GUI	Guinea	Men's; U23; U20; U17; F; BS; Women's; W U20; W U17; F	1960	1962	1962	1975	Yes
GNB	Guinea-Bissau	Men's; U23; U20; U17; F; BS; Women's; W U20; W U17; F	1974	1986	1986	1975	Yes
CIV	Ivory Coast	Men's; U23; U20; U17; F; BS; Women's; W U20; W U17; F	1960	1964	1965	1975	Yes
LBR	Liberia	Men's; U23; U20; U17; F; BS; Women's; W U20; W U17; F	1936	1964	1962	1975	Yes
MLI	Mali	Men's; U23; U20; U17; F; BS; Women's; W U20; W U17; F	1960	1964	1963	1975	Yes
MTN	Mauritania (Note: In 2025, reports circulated claiming that Mauritania had joined UNAF. These reports were incorrect, as Mauritania has never been a member of UNAF. The reports appear to have stemmed from a misunderstanding of the CAF Nations League format, in which group composition is not determined solely by the teams' sub-confederations, with some teams expected to be reassigned to balance the groups.)	Men's; U23; U20; U17; F; BS; Women's; W U20; W U17; F	1961	1970	1976	1975	Yes
NIG	Niger	Men's; U23; U20; U17; F; BS; Women's; W U20; W U17; F	1962	1964	1965	1975	Yes
NGA	Nigeria	Men's; U23; U20; U17; F; BS; Women's; W U20; W U17; F	1945	1960	1959	1975	Yes
SEN	Senegal	Men's; U23; U20; U17; F; BS; Women's; W U20; W U17; F	1960	1964	1963	1975	Yes
SLE	Sierra Leone	Men's; U23; U20; U17; F; BS; Women's; W U20; W U17; F	1960	1960	1967	1975	Yes
TOG	Togo	Men's; U23; U20; U17; F; BS; Women's; W U20; W U17; F	1960	1964	1963	1975	Yes
Central African Football Federations' Union (UNIFFAC) (8)
CMR	Cameroon	Men's; U23; U20; U17; F; BS; Women's; W U20; W U17; F	1959	1964	1963	1978	Yes
CTA	Central African Republic	Men's; U23; U20; U17; F; BS; Women's; W U20; W U17; F	1961	1964	1968	1978	Yes
CHA	Chad	Men's; U23; U20; U17; F; BS; Women's; W U20; W U17; F	1962	1964	1964	1978	Yes
CGO	Congo	Men's; U23; U20; U17; F; BS; Women's; W U20; W U17; F	1962	1964	1965	1978	Yes
COD	DR Congo	Men's; U23; U20; U17; F; BS; Women's; W U20; W U17; F	1919	1964	1964	1978	Yes
EQG	Equatorial Guinea	Men's; U23; U20; U17; F; BS; Women's; W U20; W U17; F	1957	1986	1986	1978	Yes
GAB	Gabon	Men's; U23; U20; U17; F; BS; Women's; W U20; W U17; F	1962	1966	1968	1978	Yes
STP	São Tomé and Príncipe	Men's; U23; U20; U17; F; BS; Women's; W U20; W U17; F	1975	1986	1986	1978	Yes
Council for East and Central Africa Football Associations (CECAFA) (12 (Note: Zanzibar is a full-member of CECAFA; however, it not part of CAF or FIFA. Zanzibar held full CAF membership for four months in 2017, then its status was changed after CAF stated that Zanzibar's membership was an error.))
BDI	Burundi	Men's; U23; U20; U17; F; BS; Women's; W U20; W U17; F	1948	1972	1972	1994	Yes
DJI	Djibouti	Men's; U23; U20; U17; F; BS; Women's; W U20; W U17; F	1979	1994	1994	1994	Yes
ERI	Eritrea	Men's; U23; U20; U17; F; BS; Women's; W U20; W U17; F	1996	1998	1998	1973	Yes
ETH	Ethiopia	Men's; U23; U20; U17; F; BS; Women's; W U20; W U17; F	1943	1952	1957	1983	Yes
KEN	Kenya	Men's; U23; U20; U17; F; BS; Women's; W U20; W U17; F	1960	1960	1961	1973	Yes
RWA	Rwanda	Men's; U23; U20; U17; F; BS; Women's; W U20; W U17; F	1975	1978	1976	1995	Yes
SOM	Somalia	Men's; U23; U20; U17; F; BS; Women's; W U20; W U17; F	1951	1962	1968	1973	Yes
SSD	South Sudan	Men's; U23; U20; U17; F; BS; Women's; W U20; W U17; F	2011	2012	2012	2012	Yes
SDN	Sudan	Men's; U23; U20; U17; F; BS; Women's; W U20; W U17; F	1936	1948	1957	1975	Yes
TAN	Tanzania	Men's; U23; U20; U17; F; BS; Women's; W U20; W U17; F	1945	1964	1965	1973	Yes
UGA	Uganda	Men's; U23; U20; U17; F; BS; Women's; W U20; W U17; F	1924	1960	1961	1973	Yes
Council of Southern Africa Football Associations (COSAFA) (14)
ANG	Angola	Men's; U23; U20; U17; F; BS; Women's; W U20; W U17; F	1979	1980	1980	1997	Yes
BOT	Botswana	Men's; U23; U20; U17; F; BS; Women's; W U20; W U17; F	1970	1978	1976	1997	Yes
COM	Comoros	Men's; U23; U20; U17; F; BS; Women's; W U20; W U17; F	1979	2005	2003	2007	Yes
SWZ	Eswatini	Men's; U23; U20; U17; F; BS; Women's; W U20; W U17; F	1968	1978	1976	1997	Yes
LES	Lesotho	Men's; U23; U20; U17; F; BS; Women's; W U20; W U17; F	1932	1964	1963	1997	Yes
MAD	Madagascar	Men's; U23; U20; U17; F; BS; Women's; W U20; W U17; F	1961	1964	1963	2000	Yes
MWI	Malawi	Men's; U23; U20; U17; F; BS; Women's; W U20; W U17; F	1966	1968	1974	1997	Yes
MRI	Mauritius	Men's; U23; U20; U17; F; BS; Women's; W U20; W U17; F	1952	1964	1965	2000	Yes
MOZ	Mozambique	Men's; U23; U20; U17; F; BS; Women's; W U20; W U17; F	1975	1980	1978	1997	Yes
NAM	Namibia	Men's; U23; U20; U17; F; BS; Women's; W U20; W U17; F	1990	1992	1992	1997	Yes
SEY	Seychelles	Men's; U23; U20; U17; F; BS; Women's; W U20; W U17; F	1979	1986	1986	2000	Yes
RSA	South Africa (Note: Excluded from CAF and from the 1957 African Cup of Nations due to apartheid.)	Men's; U23; U20; U17; F; BS; Women's; W U20; W U17; F	1892	1992	1992	1997	Yes
ZAM	Zambia	Men's; U23; U20; U17; F; BS; Women's; W U20; W U17; F	1929	1964	1964	1997	Yes
ZIM	Zimbabwe	Men's; U23; U20; U17; F; BS; Women's; W U20; W U17; F	1892	1965	1980	1997	Yes
Non-member special cases (2)
REU	Réunion (Note: Réunion is an associate member of COSAFA; however, it not part of CAF or FIFA..)	Men's; U23; U20; U17; F; BS; Women's; W U20; W U17; F	1956			1992	No
ZAN	Zanzibar	Men's; U23; U20; U17; F; BS; Women's; W U20; W U17; F	1926			1973	No

Additionally, there are territories located in Africa which are not affiliated with CAF or any other confederation to any extent.

- Mayotte
- Chagos Islands (British Indian Ocean Territory)

Some African states with limited or no international recognition have official national teams, but none have been considered for CAF membership. Instead, they are affiliated with organisations such as CONIFA. Somaliland is not a member of CONIFA after leaving in 2010s and is a candidate to join FIFA after its recognition in the coming years.

- Somaliland FIFA code: SMD
- Sahrawi Arab Democratic Republic

== Competitions ==
=== CAF competitions ===
National teams:

Men

- Africa Cup of Nations
- African Nations League
- U-23 Africa Cup of Nations
- U-20 Africa Cup of Nations
- U-17 Africa Cup of Nations
- CAF African Schools U15 Boy's
- Futsal Africa Cup of Nations
- African Youth Olympic Futsal Qualifying Tournament
- Beach Soccer Africa Cup of Nations

Women

- Women's Africa Cup of Nations
- African U-20 Women's World Cup qualification
- African U-17 Women's World Cup qualification
- CAF African Schools U15 Girl's
- Women's Futsal Africa Cup of Nations

Defunct

- African Nations Championship

Clubs:

- CAF Super Cup
- CAF Champions League
- CAF Confederation Cup
- CAF Women's Champions League
- CAF U-20 Women's Champions League

Defunct

- African Cup Winners' Cup
- CAF Cup
- African Football League

Regional:

- CECAFA Cup
- WAFU Nations Cup
- COSAFA Cup
- CEMAC Cup
- UNIFFAC Cup (U-17)
- UNAF U-23 Tournament

Defunct

- Amilcar Cabral Cup
- CEMAC Cup

Inter Continental:

Defunct

- Afro-Asian Cup of Nations
- Afro-Asian Club Championship
- UEFA–CAF Meridian Cup

=== International ===
Shortly after formation, CAF organised the Africa Cup of Nations (abbreviated AFCON) in 1957 and it has since become its flagship competition. Faced with undisclosed decline in popularity of local competitions and the mass exodus of homegrown footballers to Europe, Asia and the Americas in the 1990s and early 2000s, CAF launched the African Nations Championship (alternatively, though not widely used, the Championship of African Nations (CHAN)) on 11 September 2007 and began organisation two years later, to address this issue. CAF also organises qualification tournaments/competitions for the FIFA U-20 World Cup and the FIFA U-17 World Cup for its member associations; both of which initially began on a home-and-away two-legged basis but has since 1995 been organised in appointed host countries as respectively the Under-20 and U-17 Africa Cup of Nations.

For women's football operates competitions which currently serve as qualification tournaments for the related FIFA-organised tournaments which launched at the exact same year they began formation. The flagship African women's football competition/tournament is the Women's Africa Cup of Nations, which launched in 1991 as the African Women's Championship and was known in the mass media between 2015 and 2021 as the Africa/African Women/Women's Cup of Nations, which currently qualifies 4 teams to the FIFA Women's World Cup. CAF also organises qualification matches for "promising future female footballers" at both the Under-20 and Under-17 levels, launched in 2002 and 2008 respectively, both of which crowns no champions but instead qualifies 2 teams to compete at the FIFA U-20 Women's World Cup and the FIFA U-17 Women's World Cup respectively.

=== Club ===
For African clubs, CAF runs the CAF Men's and Women's Champions League, the CAF Confederation Cup, the CAF Super Cup and the African Schools Football Championship for both males and females. First held in 1964 as the African Cup of Champions Clubs (simply known sometimes as the African Cup) and rebranded in 1997 as the CAF Champions League, this football club competition currently features the champions of top-division leagues of CAF member associations and the runners-up teams of the league classifications of member associations the top 12 ranked national associations as documented by the CAF 5-year ranking system.

A currently-former competition, the African Cup Winners' Cup, commenced in 1975 for national cup winners of member associations and a third currently-former competition, the CAF Cup, launched in 1992 for African teams who finished below the top 2 positions of the league classifications of member associations and haven't met any criteria for qualification to any CAF competition. CAF decided to merge these two competitions together to form the current second-tier CAF Confederation Cup in 2004, and it currently incorporates the participation of national cup winners from the Cup Winners' Cup, whiles maintaining the format of the participation of teams who finished 3rd in the top-division league classifications of the 12 highest-ranked member associations as documented by the CAF 5-Year Ranking system from the CAF Cup. It is also ranked below the CAF Champions League.

The winners of the CAF Champions League play the winners of the African Cup Winners' Cup until 2004 and the CAF Confederation Cup thereafter in the CAF Super Cup which was launched in 1993.

The Afro-Asian Club Championship was an annual football match jointly organised between CAF and the Asian Football Confederation (AFC) between the winners of the CAF Champions League and the winners of the AFC Champions League between 1987 and 1999.

The CAF Women's Champions League was announced and approved on 30 June 2020, launched on 12 September that year and began contesting the following year, i.e. 2021. It features women's national league and cup winners nvolving the champions of CAF's sub-confederation qualification tournaments for women's club teams.

=== Current title holders ===
Competition	Year	Champions	Title	Runners-up	Next edition
Men's national teams
Africa Cup of Nations	2025 (final)	Morocco	2nd	Senegal	2027 (final)
U-23 Cup of Nations	2023	Morocco	1st	Egypt	2027
Men's African Games Tournament	2023	Ghana	1st	Uganda	2027
U-20 Cup of Nations (Note: This tournament was initially formed as a home-and-away qualification tournament for U-21 African nations in 1977. Since 1979, a proper tournament was launched as the African Youth Championship and used these branded titles until 2015: African U-21 Cup of Nations until 1989, African U-21 Championship until 2003 and African U-20 Championship until 2015. The current name was adopted in 2017.)	2025	South Africa	1st	Morocco	2027
U-17 Cup of Nations (Note: From 1995 to 2015, the tournament was known as the African U-17 Championship. The current name was adopted in 2017.)	2026	Senegal	2nd	Tanzania	2027
CAF African Schools U15 Boy's	2026	Senegal	1st	Uganda	2027
Futsal Cup of Nations	2026	Morocco	4th	Angola	2028
Youth Olympic Futsal Qualifying Tournament	2018	Egypt	1st	Angola	2026
Beach Soccer Cup of Nations	2024	Senegal	5th	Mauritania	2026
Women's national teams
Women's Africa Cup of Nations	2026 (final)	Cameroon	1st	Malawi	2028 (final)
Women's African Games Tournament	2023	Ghana	2nd	Nigeria	2027
African U-20 Women's World Cup qualification	2026	Tanzania; Ghana; Benin; Nigeria	1st 7th 1st 12th	Cameroon; Uganda; Ivory Coast; Malawi	2028
African U-17 Women's World Cup qualification	2026	Kenya; Zambia; Nigeria; Ghana	2nd 4th 9th 7th	South Africa; Ethiopia; Benin; Senegal	2027
Women's Futsal Africa Cup of Nations	2025	Morocco	1st	Tanzania	2029
CAF African Schools U15 Girl's	2026	Ghana	2nd	Burkina Faso	2027
Men's club teams
Super Cup	2025	(Egypt) Pyramids FC	1st	(Morocco) RS Berkane	2026
Champions League	2025–26 (final)	(South Africa) Mamelodi Sundowns	2nd	(Morocco) AS FAR	2026–27 (final)
Confederation Cup	2025–26 (final)	(Algeria) USM Alger	2nd	(Egypt) Zamalek	2026–27 (final)
Women's club teams
Women's Champions League	2026 (final)	(Morocco) AS FAR	3rd	(South Africa) Mamelodi Sundowns	2027 (final)

=== Competition winners ===
Nation	Men								Women			Total
Nation	CAN	CHAN	U-23s	U-20s	U-17s	Futsal	Beach Soccer	African Games	WAFCON	African Games	Women's Futsal	Total
Nigeria	3	—	1	7	2	–	–	1	10	3	—	27
Egypt	7	–	1	4	1	3	—	2	—	—	—	18
Cameroon	5	—	—	1	2	—	–	4	1	1	—	14
Ghana	4	—	—	4	2	—	—	2	—	2	—	14
Morocco	2	3	1	1	1	4	—	—	—	—	1	13
Senegal	1	1	—	1	2	—	5	1	—	—	—	11
Ivory Coast	3	—	—	—	1	—	—	—	—	—	—	4
Algeria	2	—	—	1	—	—	—	1	—	—	—	4
(Democratic Republic of the Congo) DR Congo	2	2	—	—	—	—	—	—	—	—	—	4

== Sponsorship ==
In October 2004, South African telecommunications giant, MTN, contracted a 4-year deal to sponsor CAF competitions worth US$12.5 million, which was the biggest sponsorship deal in African sporting history at that time.

CAF opened new sponsorship callouts when MTN's contract expired and French telecommunications giant Orange scooped it up in July 2009, signing an 8-year comprehensive long-term undisclosed deal to sponsor CAF competitions with a value of €100 million.

On 21 July 2016, French energy and petroleum giant, Total S.A., replaced Orange as the main sponsor with an 8-year sponsorship package from CAF for a value of €950 million to support its competitions. Total rebranded as TotalEnergies on 28 May 2021.

The current main CAF sponsors are:

- 1xBet
- TikTok
- TotalEnergies
- Orange

== FIFA World Rankings ==
=== Overview ===
FIFA Men's Rankings (as of 18 November 2026)
CAF*	FIFA	+/-	National Team	Points
1	5	▲2	Morocco	1809.37
2	18	Steady	Senegal	1655.34
3	26	▼1	Egypt	1580.49
4	28	▲1	Ivory Coast	1565.93
5	29	▲1	Nigeria	1564.18
6	32	▼4	Algeria	1557.94
7	39	▲1	DR Congo	1503.08
8	42	Steady	Cameroon	1495.84
9	43	▲4	Mali	1485.35
10	48	Steady	South Africa	1468.62
11	59	▲3	Burkina Faso	1422.07
12	64	▼3	Tunisia	1392.58
13	69	▲1	Ghana	1367.02
14	71	▼3	Cape Verde	1360.08
15	80	▲2	Guinea	1305.25
16	83	Steady	Angola	1292.86
17	85	▲4	Benin	1281.5
18	87	▼2	Gabon	1269.58
19	89	▼2	Uganda	1269.12
20	91	Steady	Zambia	1252.32
21	98	Steady	Mozambique	1230.92
22	105	▲2	Comoros	1200.61
23	106	▲7	Libya	1191.69
24	107	▲2	Gambia	1186.03
25	108	▼5	Equatorial Guinea	1184.52
26	109	▼3	Madagascar	1182.26
27	112	▲3	Tanzania	1170.61
28	113	▲7	Togo	1169.87
29	114	▼3	Niger	1168.91
30	115	▼1	Kenya	1168.82
31	118	▼8	Mauritania	1161.77
32	120	▲4	Guinea-Bissau	1159.01
33	122	▼4	Sudan	1150.24
34	125	▼6	Rwanda	1145.08
35	126	▲3	Zimbabwe	1143.92
36	129	▼6	Namibia	1135.95
37	130	▲1	Malawi	1127.22
38	131	▼1	Sierra Leone	1126.5
39	137	▼5	Congo	1094.13
40	138	▲2	Burundi	1085.04
41	139	▲2	Botswana	1082.99
42	143	▲3	Liberia	1078.08
43	144	▲3	Ethiopia	1071.78
44	147	▲3	Lesotho	1063.63
45	150	▼5	Central African Republic	1049.66
46	166	▼2	Eswatini	979.28
47	170	Steady	South Sudan	948.83
48	179	Steady	Mauritius	906.24
49	180	▲1	Chad	896.85
50	186	▼3	Eritrea	882.38
51	194	Steady	São Tomé and Príncipe	855.1
52	195	Steady	Djibouti	853.58
53	199	▲1	Somalia	826.39
54	205	Steady	Seychelles	795.63
*Local rankings based on FIFA ranking points

FIFA Women's Rankings (as of 20 October 2026)
CAF*	FIFA	+/-	National Team	Points
1	43	▼7	Nigeria	1518.02
2	59	▼2	South Africa	1427.91
3	62	▲9	Cameroon	1416.49
4	64	Steady	Morocco	1384.71
5	65	▼5	Ghana	1383.11
6	70	▼5	Zambia	1363.47
7	72	Steady	Ivory Coast	1349.27
8	73	▲1	Algeria	1346.06
9	76	▲3	Senegal	1310.26
10	86	▼2	Mali	1246.96
11	93	▼3	Equatorial Guinea	1209.26
12	104	▲49	Malawi	1177.33
13	107	▼5	Tunisia	1174.95
14	109	▲9	Burkina Faso	1168.21
15	111	▲11	Tanzania	1164.03
16	112	▼1	Congo	1161.03
17	113	▼14	Egypt	1159.69
18	114	▼8	DR Congo	1156.63
19	121	▼1	Cape Verde	1134.71
20	128	Steady	Kenya	1106.41
21	131	▼6	Namibia	1099.86
22	133	Steady	Togo	1092.99
23	134	▲5	Benin	1089.9
24	135	▼1	Gambia	1082.47
25	136	▼9	Zimbabwe	1078.3
26	140	▼2	Ethiopia	1066.87
27	143	▲2	Uganda	1063.6
28	145	▼2	Guinea	1048.64
29	148	▼4	Central African Republic	1038.44
30	150	▼1	Gabon	1028.74
31	152	Steady	Sierra Leone	1021.39
32	153	▲2	Angola	1011.42
33	155	▼7	Botswana	1005.65
34	156	Steady	Chad	985.55
35	169	Steady	Rwanda	897.44
36	171	Steady	Liberia	882.37
37	173	Steady	Mozambique	874.79
38	174	Steady	Niger	863.94
39	176	▲1	Guinea-Bissau	838.58
40	177	▲1	Lesotho	836.43
41	178	▼3	Seychelles	836.36
42	180	▼1	Burundi	822.1
43	184	Steady	Eswatini	797.06
44	187	Steady	Comoros	749.38
45	188	Steady	Libya	739.94
46	191	Steady	Madagascar	726.73
47	194	Steady	Sudan	628.74
48	195	Steady	South Sudan	628.66
49	197	Steady	Djibouti	556.64
50	198	Steady	Mauritius	435.47
*Local rankings based on FIFA ranking points

=== Historical leaders ===
==== Men ====
Top four teams at year-end
Year	First	Second	Third	Fourth
1993	Nigeria	Cameroon	Egypt	Zambia
1994	Nigeria	Zambia	Egypt	Ivory Coast
1995	Ivory Coast	Tunisia	Egypt	Zambia
1996	South Africa	Zambia	Tunisia	Ghana
1997	Morocco	Zambia	Tunisia	South Africa
1998	Morocco	Tunisia	South Africa	Egypt
1999	Morocco	South Africa	Tunisia	Zambia
2000	South Africa	Tunisia	Morocco	Egypt
2001	Tunisia	South Africa	Morocco	Cameroon
2002	Cameroon	Senegal	Nigeria	South Africa
2003	Cameroon	Egypt	Senegal	Nigeria
2004	Nigeria	Cameroon	Senegal	Morocco
2005	Cameroon	Nigeria	Tunisia	Senegal
2006	Nigeria	Cameroon	Ivory Coast	Guinea
2007	Nigeria	Cameroon	Guinea	Ivory Coast
2008	Cameroon	Egypt	Nigeria	Ghana
2009	Cameroon	Ivory Coast	Nigeria	Egypt
2010	Egypt	Ghana	Ivory Coast	Nigeria
2011	Ivory Coast	Ghana	Algeria	Egypt
2012	Ivory Coast	Algeria	Mali	Ghana
2013	Ivory Coast	Ghana	Algeria	Nigeria
2014	Algeria	Tunisia	Ivory Coast	Senegal
2015	Ivory Coast	Algeria	Ghana	Cape Verde
2016	Senegal	Ivory Coast	Tunisia	Egypt
2017	Senegal	Tunisia	Egypt	DR Congo
2018	Senegal	Tunisia	Morocco	Nigeria
2019	Senegal	Tunisia	Nigeria	Algeria
2020	Senegal	Tunisia	Algeria	Morocco
2021	Senegal	Morocco	Tunisia	Algeria
2022	Morocco	Senegal	Tunisia	Cameroon
2023	Morocco	Senegal	Tunisia	Algeria
2024	Morocco	Senegal	Egypt	Algeria
2025	Morocco	Senegal	Algeria	Egypt
2026	Morocco	Senegal	Egypt	Ivory Coast

==== Women ====
Team ranking in the top four – Women's
Year	First	Second	Third	Fourth
2003	Nigeria	Ghana	Morocco	South Africa
2004	Nigeria	Ghana	Morocco	South Africa
2005	Nigeria	Ghana	Egypt	South Africa
2006	Nigeria	Ghana	Morocco	South Africa
2007	Nigeria	Ghana	Eritrea	Algeria
2008	Nigeria	Ghana	South Africa	Morocco
2009	Nigeria	Ghana	South Africa	Algeria
2010	Nigeria	Ghana	South Africa	Equatorial Guinea
2011	Nigeria	Ghana	Equatorial Guinea	Cameroon
2012	Nigeria	Cameroon	Ghana	Equatorial Guinea
2013	Nigeria	Cameroon	Ghana	South Africa
2014	Nigeria	Ghana	Cameroon	Equatorial Guinea
2015	Nigeria	Cameroon	Ghana	Equatorial Guinea
2016	Nigeria	Ghana	Cameroon	Equatorial Guinea
2017	Nigeria	Ghana	Cameroon	Equatorial Guinea
2018	Nigeria	Cameroon	South Africa	Ghana
2019	Nigeria	Cameroon	South Africa	Ghana
2020	Nigeria	Cameroon	South Africa	Ghana
2021	Nigeria	Cameroon	South Africa	Ghana
2022	Nigeria	South Africa	Cameroon	Ghana
2023	Nigeria	South Africa	Morocco	Ghana
2024	Nigeria	South Africa	Morocco	Zambia
2025	Nigeria	South Africa	Ghana	Zambia

== Other rankings ==
=== Men's Futsal ===
Per 12 December 2025:

CAF	FIFA	Country	Points
1	6	Morocco	1481
2	39	Egypt	1098
3	50	Libya	1053
4	58	South Africa	1022
5	59	Angola	1021
6	66	Equatorial Guinea	999
7	98	Zambia	939
8	100	Algeria	916
9	105	Cameroon	729
10	114	Mauritania	661
11	126	Somalia	547
12	127	Comoros	544

(*)= Provisional ranking (played at least 10 matches) (**)= Inactive for more than 24 months

=== Beach soccer national teams ===
Rankings are calculated by Beach Soccer Worldwide (BSWW). Top ten, last updated 19 January 2026

CAF	BSWW	Country	Points
1	8	Senegal	1636.25
2	20	Morocco	755
3	24	Mauritania	561.75
4	24	Egypt	541.25
5	44	Seychelles	252.25
6	50	Tanzania	210
7	59	Mozambique	168.25
8	62	Ghana	151
9	67	Malawi	124.25
10	75	Libya	82.75

== Major tournament records ==
Legend

- 1st – Champions
- 2nd – Runners-up
- 3rd – Third place
- 4th – Fourth place
- QF – Quarter-finals (1934–1938, 1954–1970, and 1986–present: knockout round of 8)
- R3 — Round 3 (2026–present: knockout round of 16)
- R2 — Round 2 (1974–1978: second group stage, top 8; 1982: second group stage, top 12; 1986–2022: knockout round of 16; 2026–present: knockout round of 32)
- R1 — Round 1 (1930, 1950–1970 and 1986–present: group stage; 1934–1938: knockout round of 16; 1974–1982: first group stage)
- Q — Qualified for upcoming tournament
- •• – Qualified but withdrew
- • – Did not qualify
- × – Did not enter / Withdrew / Banned
- – Hosts
- – Not affiliated in FIFA

For each tournament, the flag of the host country and the number of teams in each finals tournament (in brackets) are shown.

=== FIFA World Cup ===
FIFA World Cup record
Team	1930 (Uruguay) (13)	1934 (Italy) (16)	1938 (France) (15)	1950 (Brazil) (13)	1954 (Switzerland) (16)	1958 (Sweden) (16)	1962 (Chile) (16)	1966 (England) (16)	1970 (Mexico) (16)	1974 (West Germany) (16)	1978 (Argentina) (16)	1982 (Spain) (24)	1986 (Mexico) (24)	1990 (Italy) (24)	1994 (United States) (24)	1998 (France) (32)	2002 (Japan) (South Korea) (32)	2006 (Germany) (32)	2010 (South Africa) (32)	2014 (Brazil) (32)	2018 (Russia) (32)	2022 (Qatar) (32)	2026 (Canada) (Mexico) (United States) (48)	2030 (Morocco) (Portugal) (Spain) (48)	2034 (Saudi Arabia) (48)	Apps.
Algeria	Part of France (Note: Algeria gained independence in 1962, but they joined with other African nations to boycott the 1966 FIFA World Cup. Thus the 1970 FIFA World Cup qualification was their first participation.)							×	•	•	•	R1; 13th	R1; 22nd	•	•	•	•	•	R1; 28th	R2; 14th	•	•	R2; 30th			5/15
Angola	Part of Portugal (Note: Angola gained independence in 1975. Thus the 1986 FIFA World Cup qualification was their first participation.)											×	•	•	•	•	•	R1; 23rd	•	•	•	•	•			1/9
Cameroon	Part of France						×	×	•	•	•	R1; 17th	•	QF; 7th	R1; 22nd	R1; 25th	R1; 20th	•	R1; 31st	R1; 32nd	•	R1; 19th	•			8/15
Cape Verde	Part of Portugal												×	×	×	×	•	•	•	•	•	•	R2; 32nd			1/7
DR Congo (Note: The Democratic Republic of the Congo competed as Zaire in 1974.)	Part of Belgium (Note: Democratic Republic of the Congo gained independence in 1960, but they joined with other African nations to boycott the 1966 FIFA World Cup. Thus the 1974 FIFA World Cup qualification was their first participation.)							×	×	R1; 16th	×	•	•	•	•	•	•	•	•	•	•	•	R2; 23rd			2/13
Egypt	×	R1; 13th	×	×	•	×	×	×	×	•	•	•	•	R1; 20th	•	•	•	•	•	•	R1; 31st	•	R3; 15th			4/16
Ghana	Part of the United Kingdom					×	•	×	•	•	•	×	•	•	•	•	•	R2; 13th	QF; 7th	R1; 25th	•	R1; 24th	R2; 24th			5/15
Ivory Coast	Part of France						×	×	×	•	•	×	•	•	•	•	•	R1; 19th	R1; 17th	R1; 21st	•	•	R2; 19th			4/12
Morocco	Protectorate of France/Spain						•	×	R1; 14th	•	•	•	R2; 11th	•	R1; 23rd	R1; 18th	•	•	•	•	R1; 27th	4th	QF; T-7th	Q		7/16
Nigeria	Part of the United Kingdom						•	×	•	•	•	•	•	•	R2; 9th	R2; 12th	R1; 27th	•	R1; 27th	R2; 16th	R1; 21st	•	•			6/16
Senegal	Part of France						×	×	•	•	•	•	•	×	•	•	QF; 7th	•	•	•	R1; 17th	R2; 10th	R2; 31st			4/13
South Africa					×	×	×	×	×	×	×	×	×	×	•	R1; 24th	R1; 17th	•	R1; 20th	•	•	•	R2; T-25th			4/9
Togo	Part of France						×	×	×	•	•	•	×	×	•	•	•	R1; 30th	•	•	•	•	•			1/11
Tunisia	Protectorate of France						•	×	•	•	R1; 9th	•	•	•	•	R1; 26th	R1; 29th	R1; 24th	•	•	R1; 24th	R1; 21st	R1; 47th			7/16
Total (14 teams)	0	1	0	0	0	0	0	0	1	1	1	2	2	2	3	5	5	5	6	5	5	5	10	TBD	TBD	59

Firsts

- 1934: Egypt first African team to qualify for the World Cup
- 1970: Morocco first African team to draw a match in the World Cup
- 1978: Tunisia first African team to win a match in the World Cup
- 1982: Algeria first African team to win two matches in the World Cup
- 1986: Algeria first African team to qualify for two consecutive World Cups
- 1986: Morocco first African team to reach the knockout stage (round of sixteen)
- 1990: Cameroon first African team to reach the knockout stage (quarter-finals)
- 1994 and 1998: Nigeria first African team to top a group stage and reach the knockout stage (round of 16) in two consecutive World Cups
- 2002: Senegal first African team to reach the knockout stage (quarter-finals) on their World Cup debut
- 2010: South Africa first African team to host the World Cup
- 2014: Algeria & Nigeria first African teams to reach the knockout stage (round of sixteen) simultaneously in the World Cup
- 2022: Morocco first African team to reach the knockout stage (semi-finals), taking fourth place
- 2026: Morocco first African team to reach the quarter-finals twice

=== FIFA Women's World Cup ===
FIFA Women's World Cup record
Team	1991 (China) (12)	1995 (Sweden) (12)	1999 (United States) (16)	2003 (United States) (16)	2007 (China) (16)	2011 (Germany) (16)	2015 (Canada) (24)	2019 (France) (24)	2023 (Australia) (New Zealand) (32)	2027 (Brazil) (32)	Apps.
Algeria	×	×	×	×	•	•	•	•	•	Q	1/6
Cameroon	•	×	•	•	•	•	R2; 11th	R2; 15th	•	Q	3/9
Equatorial Guinea	×	×	×	•	•	R1; 15th	•	×	•	•	1/6
Ghana	•	•	R1; T-13th	R1; 12th	R1; 15th	•	•	•	•		3/9
Ivory Coast	×	×	×	•	•	•	R1; 23rd	•	•	•	1/7
Malawi	×	×	×	×	•	×	×	×	•	Q	1/3
Morocco	×	×	•	•	•	•	•	•	R2; 12th	Q	2/8
Nigeria	R1; 10th	R1; 11th	QF; 7th	R1; 15th	R1; 13th	R1; 9th	R1; 21st	R2; 16th	R2; 10th	•	9/10
South Africa	×	•	•	•	•	•	•	R1; 22nd	R2; 16th		2/8
Zambia	•	•	•	•	•	•	•	•	R1; 25th	•	1/10
Total (10 teams)	1	1	2	2	2	2	3	3	4		16

=== Olympic Games ===
==== Men's tournament ====
Olympic Games (Men's tournament) record
Team	1900 (France) (3)	1904 (United States) (3)	1908 (United Kingdom) (6)	1912 (Sweden) (11)	1920 (Belgium) (14)	1924 (France) (22)	1928 (Netherlands) (17)	1936 (Germany) (16)	1948 (United Kingdom) (18)	1952 (Finland) (25)	1956 (Australia) (11)	1960 (Italy) (16)	1964 (Japan) (14)	1968 (Mexico) (16)	1972 (West Germany) (16)	1976 (Canada) (13)	1980 (Soviet Union) (16)	1984 (United States) (16)	1988 (South Korea) (16)	1992 (Spain) (16)	1996 (United States) (16)	2000 (Australia) (16)	2004 (Greece) (16)	2008 (China) (16)	2012 (United Kingdom) (16)	2016 (Brazil) (16)	2020 (Japan) (16)	2024 (France) (16)	2028 (United States) (12)	Apps.
Algeria	Part of France												–	–	–		8	–	–	–	–	–	–	–	–	14	–	–		2
Cameroon					Part of France								–	–	–	–	–	11	–	–	–	1	–	8	–	–	–	–		3
Egypt (Note: Egypt team represented the United Arab Republic with Syria in 1960 finishing the 12th and alone in 1964 finishing the 4th.)				–	8	8	4	9	11	9	–	12	4	–	–	–		8	–	12	–	–	–	–	8	–	8	4		13
Ivory Coast	Part of France												–	–	–	–		–	–	–	–	–	–	6	–		7	–		2
Gabon	Part of France														–			–	–	–	–	–	–	–	12	–	–	–		1
Ghana	Part of the United Kingdom									–		–	7	12	16			–	–	3	8	–	9	–	–	–	–	–		6
Guinea	Part of France													11			–	–	–	–	–	–	–	–	–	–	–	16		2
Mali	Part of France												–	–	–		–	–	–	–	–	–	5	–	–	–	–	14		2
Morocco				Protectorate of France/Spain								–	13	–	8	–		12	–	15	–	16	=10	–	11	–	–	3		8
Nigeria					Part of the United Kingdom					–	–	–	–	14	–		13	–	15	–	1	8	–	2	–	3	–	–		7
Senegal	Part of France												–	–	–	–	–	–	–	–	–	–	–	–	6	–	–	–		1
South Africa		–	–	–	–	–	–	–	–	–	–	–	Banned because of apartheid							–	–	11	–	–	–	13	16	–		3
Sudan	Part of the United Kingdom											–		–	15			–	–	–	–	–	–	–	–	–	–	–		1
Tunisia	Part of France											15	–	–	–	–		–	13	–	14	–	12	–	–	–	–	–		4
Zambia						Part of the United Kingdom						RHO	–	–	–		15	–	5	–	–	–	–	–	–	–	–	–		2
Total (15 teams)		0	0	0	1	1	1	1	1	1	0	3	3	3	3	3	3	3	3	3	3	4	4	3	4	3	3	4		

==== Women's tournament ====
Olympic Games (Women's tournament) record
Team	1996 (United States) (8)	2000 (Australia) (8)	2004 (Greece) (10)	2008 (China) (12)	2012 (United Kingdom) (12)	2016 (Brazil) (12)	2020 (Japan) (12)	2024 (France) (12)	2028 (United States) (16)	Apps.
Cameroon	–	–	–	–	12	–	–	–		1
Nigeria	–	8	6	11	–	–	–	11		4
South Africa	–	–	–	–	10	10	–	–		2
Zambia	–	–	–	–	–	–	9	12		2
Zimbabwe	–	–	–	–	–	12	–	–		1
Total (5 teams)	0	1	1	1	2	2	1	2		10

=== Africa Cup of Nations ===
Team	(Sudan) 1957 (3)	(United Arab Republic) 1959 (3)	(Ethiopia) 1962 (4)	(Ghana) 1963 (6)	(Tunisia) 1965 (6)	(Ethiopia) 1968 (8)	(Sudan) 1970 (8)	(Cameroon) 1972 (8)	(Egypt) 1974 (8)	(Ethiopia) 1976 (8)	(Ghana) 1978 (8)	(Nigeria) 1980 (8)	(Libya) 1982 (8)	(Ivory Coast) 1984 (8)	(Egypt) 1986 (8)	(Morocco) 1988 (8)	(Algeria) 1990 (8)	(Senegal) 1992 (12)	(Tunisia) 1994 (12)	(South Africa) 1996 (15)	(Burkina Faso) 1998 (16)	(Ghana) (Nigeria) 2000 (16)	(Mali) 2002 (16)	(Tunisia) 2004 (16)	(Egypt) 2006 (16)	(Ghana) 2008 (16)	(Angola) 2010 (15)	(Equatorial Guinea) (Gabon) 2012 (16)	(South Africa) 2013 (16)	(Equatorial Guinea) 2015 (16)	(Gabon) 2017 (16)	(Egypt) 2019 (24)	(Cameroon) 2021 (24)	(Ivory Coast) 2023 (24)	(Morocco) 2025 (24)	(Kenya) (Tanzania) (Uganda) 2027 (24)	Apps.
North Africa members
Algeria	Part of France				×	GS	•	•	•	•	•	2nd	4th	3rd	GS	3rd	1st	GS	••	QF	GS	QF	GS	QF	•	•	4th	•	GS	QF	GS	1st	GS	GS	QF		21
Egypt	1st	1st	2nd	3rd	×	×	3rd	•	3rd	4th	•	4th	×	4th	1st	GS	GS	GS	QF	QF	1st	QF	QF	GS	1st	1st	1st	•	•	•	2nd	R16	2nd	R16	4th		27
Libya						•	×	•	×	×	×	×	2nd	•	•	×	×	×	×	×	×	•	•	•	GS	•	•	GS	•	•	•	•	•	•	•		3
Morocco			×	•	×	×	•	GS	×	1st	GS	3rd	•	•	4th	4th	•	GS	•	•	QF	GS	GS	2nd	GS	GS	•	GS	GS	••	QF	R16	QF	R16	1st		20
Tunisia			3rd	GS	2nd	•	×	×	×	•	4th	×	GS	•	•	•	•	•	GS	2nd	QF	4th	GS	1st	QF	QF	GS	QF	GS	QF	QF	4th	QF	GS	R16		22
West Africa members
Benin	Part of France				×	×	×	•	×	×	×	•	×	•	•	•	•	•	•	×	•	•	•	GS	•	GS	GS	•	•	•	•	QF	•	•	R16		5
Burkina Faso	Part of France				×	•	×	×	•	×	GS	×	•	×	×	×	•	•	×	GS	4th	GS	GS	GS	•	•	GS	GS	2nd	GS	3rd	•	4th	R16	R16		14
Cape Verde	Part of Portugal																		•	×		•	•	•	•	•	•	•	QF	GS	•	•	R16	QF	•		4
Gambia	Part of the United Kingdom					×	×	×	×	•	×	•	•	•	•	•	×	•	×	×	×	×	•	•	•	•	•	•	•	×	•	•	QF	GS	•		2
Ghana	UK		•	1st	1st	2nd	2nd	•	•	•	1st	GS	1st	GS	•	•	•	2nd	QF	4th	GS	QF	QF	•	GS	3rd	2nd	4th	4th	2nd	4th	R16	GS	GS	•		24
Guinea	FRA			••	•	•	GS	•	GS	2nd	•	GS	•	•	•	•	•	•	GS	•	GS	•	×	QF	QF	QF	•	GS	•	QF	•	R16	R16	QF	•		14
Guinea-Bissau	Part of Portugal															×	×	×	•	×	×	×	×	×	•	×	•	•	•	•	GS	GS	GS	GS	•		4
Ivory Coast	Part of France				3rd	3rd	4th	•	GS	•	••	GS	×	GS	3rd	GS	GS	1st	3rd	GS	QF	GS	GS	•	2nd	4th	QF	2nd	QF	1st	GS	QF	R16	1st	QF		26
Liberia				×	×	•	×	×	×	•	×	×	•	×	•	•	•	×	•	GS	•	•	GS	•	•	•	•	•	•	•	•	•	•	•	•		2
Mali	Part of France				•	•	•	2nd	•	•	•	•	•	•	•	•	•	•	4th	•	•	•	4th	4th	•	GS	GS	3rd	3rd	GS	GS	R16	R16	QF	QF		14
Mauritania	Part of France									×	×	•	•	×	•	×	×	•	×	•	•	×	•	•	•	•	•	×	×	•	•	GS	GS	R16	•		3
Niger	Part of France					×	•	•	×	•	×	×	×	•	×	×	×	•	•	×	×	•	•	•	•	•	•	GS	GS	•	•	•	•	•	•		2
Nigeria			×	GS	×	•	×	•	•	3rd	3rd	1st	GS	2nd	•	2nd	2nd	3rd	1st	••	×	2nd	3rd	3rd	3rd	QF	3rd	•	1st	•	•	3rd	R16	2nd	3rd		21
Senegal	Part of France				4th	GS	•	•	•	•	•	×	•	•	GS	•	4th	QF	QF	•	•	QF	2nd	QF	4th	GS	•	GS	•	GS	QF	2nd	1st	R16	2nd		18
Sierra Leone	Part of the UK					×	×	×	•	×	•	×	•	•	×	•	×	•	GS	GS	×	×	•	•	•	•	•	•	•	•	•	×	GS	•	•		3
Togo	Part of France				×	•	•	GS	×	•	•	•	•	GS	•	•	×	•	×	•	GS	GS	GS	•	GS	•	••	•	QF	•	GS	•	•	•	•		8
Central Africa members
Cameroon	Part of France				×	•	GS	3rd	•	•	•	•	GS	1st	2nd	1st	GS	4th	•	GS	QF	1st	1st	QF	QF	2nd	QF	•	•	GS	1st	R16	3rd	R16	QF		22
Congo	Part of France					GS	×	1st	4th	•	GS	•	•	•	•	•	×	QF	•	•	•	GS	•	•	•	•	•	•	•	QF	•	•	•	•	•		7
DR Congo	Part of Belgium				GS	1st	GS	4th	1st	GS	×	•	•	×	•	GS	•	QF	QF	QF	3rd	GS	QF	GS	QF	•	•	•	GS	3rd	QF	R16	•	4th	R16		21
Equatorial Guinea	Part of Spain															×	•	×	×	×	×	×	•	•	•	•	•	QF	•	4th	•	•	QF	R16	GS		5
Gabon	Part of France						×	•	×	×	•	×	×	•	•	•	•	•	GS	QF	•	GS	•	•	•	•	GS	QF	•	GS	GS	•	R16	•	GS		9
East Africa members
Burundi	Part of Belgium								×	•	×	×	×	×	×	×	×	×	•	×	×	•	•	•	•	•	•	•	•	•	•	GS	•	•	•		1
Ethiopia	2nd	3rd	1st	4th	GS	4th	GS	•	•	GS	•	•	GS	•	×	×	•	×	•	•	•	×	•	•	•	•	×	•	GS	•	•	•	GS	•	•		11
Kenya			•	•	•	•	•	GS	•	•	•	•	•	×	•	GS	GS	GS	•	×	•	•	•	GS	•	•	•	•	•	•	•	GS	•	×	•	Q	7
Rwanda	Part of Belgium										×	×	•	•	×	×	×	×	×	×	×	•	•	GS	•	•	•	•	•	×	•	•	•	•	•		1
Sudan	3rd	2nd	•	2nd	•	•	1st	GS	•	GS	×	•	×	•	×	•	•	•	•	•	×	×	•	•	•	GS	•	QF	•	•	•	•	GS	•	R16		10
Tanzania						×	•	•	•	•	•	GS	×	•	×	•	•	•	×	•	•	•	•	×	•	•	•	•	•	•	•	GS	•	GS	R16	Q	5
Uganda			4th	×	•	GS	•	•	GS	GS	2nd	×	×	•	•	•	×	•	•	•	•	•	•	•	•	•	•	•	•	•	GS	R16	•	•	GS	Q	9
Southern Africa members
Angola	Part of Portugal												•	•	×	•	•	•	•	GS	GS	•	•	•	GS	QF	QF	GS	GS	•	•	GS	•	QF	GS		10
Botswana	Part of the United Kingdom										×	×	×	×	×	×	×	×	•	•	•	•	•	•	•	•	•	GS	•	•	•	•	•	•	GS		2
Comoros	Part of France																							×	×	×	•	•	•	•	•	•	R16	•	GS		2
Madagascar	Part of France				×	×	×	•	•	×	×	•	•	•	•	•	×	•	×	×	×	•	•	•	•	•	•	•	•	•	•	QF	•	•	•		1
Malawi	Part of the United Kingdom								×	•	•	•	•	GS	•	•	•	•	•	•	•	•	•	•	•	•	GS	•	•	•	•	•	R16	•	•		3
Mauritius						•	•	•	GS	•	•	•	•	•	•	×	•	•	•	•	•	•	•	•	•	•	•	•	×	•	•	•	•	•	•		1
Mozambique	Part of Portugal											×	•	•	GS	•	•	•	•	GS	GS	•	•	•	•	•	GS	•	•	•	•	•	•	GS	R16		6
Namibia	Part of South Africa																	×	×	•	GS	•	•	•	•	GS	•	•	•	•	•	GS	•	R16	•		4
South Africa	••	Banned because of apartheid																	•	1st	2nd	3rd	QF	GS	GS	GS	•	•	QF	GS	•	QF	•	3rd	R16		12
Zambia					×	×	•	•	2nd	•	GS	•	3rd	•	GS	×	3rd	QF	2nd	3rd	GS	GS	GS	•	GS	GS	QF	1st	GS	GS	•	•	•	GS	GS		19
Zimbabwe													•	•	•	•	•	•	•	•	•	•	•	GS	GS	•	•	•	•	•	GS	GS	GS	×	GS		6
Team	(Sudan) 1957 (3)	(United Arab Republic) 1959 (3)	(Ethiopia) 1962 (4)	(Ghana) 1963 (6)	(Tunisia) 1965 (6)	(Ethiopia) 1968 (8)	(Sudan) 1970 (8)	(Cameroon) 1972 (8)	(Egypt) 1974 (8)	(Ethiopia) 1976 (8)	(Ghana) 1978 (8)	(Nigeria) 1980 (8)	(Libya) 1982 (8)	(Ivory Coast) 1984 (8)	(Egypt) 1986 (8)	(Morocco) 1988 (8)	(Algeria) 1990 (8)	(Senegal) 1992 (12)	(Tunisia) 1994 (12)	(South Africa) 1996 (15)	(Burkina Faso) 1998 (16)	(Ghana) (Nigeria) 2000 (16)	(Mali) 2002 (16)	(Tunisia) 2004 (16)	(Egypt) 2006 (16)	(Ghana) 2008 (16)	(Angola) 2010 (15)	(Equatorial Guinea) (Gabon) 2012 (16)	(South Africa) 2013 (16)	(Equatorial Guinea) 2015 (16)	(Gabon) 2017 (16)	(Egypt) 2019 (24)	(Cameroon) 2021 (24)	(Ivory Coast) 2023 (24)	(Morocco) 2025 (24)	(Kenya) (Tanzania) (Uganda) 2027 (24)	Apps.

=== Women's Africa Cup of Nations ===
Women's Africa Cup of Nations record
Team (Total 31 teams)	1991 (4)	1995 (6)	1998 (Nigeria) (7)	2000 (South Africa) (8)	2002 (Nigeria) (8)	2004 (South Africa) (8)	2006 (Nigeria) (8)	2008 (Equatorial Guinea) (8)	2010 (South Africa) (8)	2012 (Equatorial Guinea) (8)	2014 (Namibia) (8)	2016 (Cameroon) (8)	2018 (Ghana) (8)	2022 (Morocco) (12)	2024 (Morocco) (12)	2026 (Morocco) (16)	Apps.
Algeria				•	×	R1	R1	•	R1	×	R1	•	R1	•	QF	3rd	7
Angola		SF	×	×	R1	×	•	×	•	×	×	×	×	•	•	•	2
Botswana					×	×	×	•	•	•	•	•	×	QF	R1	•	2
Burkina Faso								×	×	×	•	•	•	R1	•	GS	2
Burundi												×	×	R1	•	•	1
Cameroon	2nd	×	4th	R1	3rd	2nd	4th	4th	4th	3rd	2nd	2nd	3rd	QF	•	1st	14
Cape Verde														×	•	GS	1
Congo	••					•	•	R1	×	×	×	×	•	•	•	×	1
DR Congo			3rd	×	•	×	R1	•	•	R1	×	×	×	×	R1	•	4
Egypt			R1	•	×	×	•	×	×	•	•	R1	×	•	•	GS	3
Equatorial Guinea					•	•	R1	1st	2nd	1st	•	•	R1	•	•	•	5
Ethiopia					R1	4th	×		•	R1	•	•	•	•	•	•	3
Ghana	QF	SF	2nd	3rd	2nd	3rd	2nd	R1	R1	•	R1	3rd	R1	•	3rd	QF	14
Guinea	SF	×	•	×	×	•	•	•	•	•	×	•	×	•	•	•	1
Ivory Coast	×	×	×	×	•	×	•	•	•	R1	3rd	•	•	•	•	QF	3
Kenya							•	×	×	×	•	R1	•	×	•	GS	2
Malawi						•	•	×	×	•	×	×	×	•	×	2nd	1
Mali					R1	R1	R1	R1	R1	•	•	R1	4th	•	QF	GS	9
Morocco			R1	R1	•	×	•	•	•	•	•	•	•	2nd	2nd	4th	5
Namibia							•	•	•	•	R1	•	•	•	•	•	1
Nigeria	1st	1st	1st	1st	1st	1st	1st	3rd	1st	4th	1st	1st	1st	4th	1st	QF	16
Réunion				R1													1
Senegal	••	×	×	×	•	•	•	•	•	R1	•	•	•	QF	QF	GS	4
Sierra Leone	×	QF	×	×	×	×	×	×	•	×	×	×	×	•	×	•	1
South Africa		2nd	R1	2nd	4th	R1	3rd	2nd	3rd	2nd	4th	4th	2nd	1st	4th	QF	15
Tanzania					•	•	•	•	R1	•	•	•	•	•	R1	GS	3
Togo							•	×	×	×	×	×	×	R1	•	•	1
Tunisia								R1	•	•	•	•	×	QF	R1	•	3
Uganda			•	R1	•	×	×	×	×	•	×	×	•	R1	•	•	2
Zambia	••	QF	×	×	•	×	•	•	×	•	R1	•	R1	3rd	QF	GS	6
Zimbabwe	••			4th	R1	R1	×	•	×	•	•	R1	•	•	×	•	4

=== FIFA U-20 World Cup ===
FIFA U-20 World Cup record
Team	1977 (Tunisia) (16)	1979 (Japan) (16)	1981 (Australia) (16)	1983 (Mexico) (16)	1985 (Soviet Union) (16)	1987 (Chile) (16)	1989 (Saudi Arabia) (16)	1991 (Portugal) (16)	1993 (Australia) (16)	1995 (Qatar) (16)	1997 (Malaysia) (24)	1999 (Nigeria) (24)	2001 (Argentina) (24)	2003 (United Arab Emirates) (24)	2005 (Netherlands) (24)	2007 (Canada) (24)	2009 (Egypt) (24)	2011 (Colombia) (24)	2013 (Turkey) (24)	2015 (New Zealand) (24)	2017 (South Korea) (24)	2019 (Poland) (24)	2023 (Argentina) (24)	2025 (Chile) (24)	2027 (Azerbaijan) (Uzbekistan) (24)	Apps.
Algeria	×	QF	•	•	•	×	•	×	•	•	•	•	•	•	•	•	•	•	•	×	•	•	•	•		1
Angola	×	×	×	•	•	×	•	×	×	•	•	•	R2	•	•	•	•	•	•	•	•	•	•	•		1
Benin	×	×	×	×	×	×	×	•	×	×	•	×	×	×	R1	×	•	•	•	•	×	•	•	•		1
Burkina Faso	×	×	×	×	×	×	×	×	×	•	•	×	•	R2	•	•	•	•	•	•	•	•	•	•		1
Burundi	×	×	×	×	×	×	×	×	×	R1	×	•	×	•	×	•	•	•	×	•	•	•	•	•		1
Cameroon	×	•	R1	•	•	•	•	•	R1	QF	•	R2	•	•	•	•	R1	R2	•	•	•	•	•	•		6
Congo	×	×	×	×	×	×	×	×	•	×	×	•	×	×	×	R2	•	•	•	•	•	•	•	×		1
Egypt	•	•	QF	•	•	•	•	R1	•	•	•	•	3rd	R2	R1	•	R2	R2	R1	•	•	•	•	R1		9
Ethiopia	×	•	•	×	•	•	×	•	•	•	•	•	R1	•	×	•	×	×	×	•	•	•	•	•		1
Gambia	×	×	×	•	•	×	×	•	×	×	×	×	•	×	•	R2	•	•	•	•	•	•	R2	•		2
Ghana	×	×	×	×	•	•	•	•	2nd	•	4th	QF	2nd	•	•	•	1st	•	3rd	R2	•	•	•	•		7
Guinea	•	R1	•	•	•	•	•	•	×	•	•	•	×	•	•	•	•	•	•	•	R1	•	•	•		2
Ivory Coast	R1	×	×	R1	•	•	•	R1	×	•	R1	•	•	R2	•	•	•	•	•	•	•	•	•	•		5
Mali	×	×	×	×	×	×	R1	•	•	•	•	3rd	•	R1	•	•	•	R1	R1	3rd	•	QF	•	•		7
Morocco	R1	•	•	•	•	•	•	•	•	•	R2	•	•	•	4th	•	•	•	•	•	•	•	•	1st		4
Nigeria	×	•	•	R1	3rd	R1	2nd	•	•	•	•	QF	•	•	2nd	QF	R2	QF	R2	R2	•	R2	QF	R2		14
Senegal	×	×	×	•	×	×	•	•	•	•	•	•	•	•	•	•	•	•	•	4th	R2	QF	R1	•		4
South Africa	×	×	×	×	×	×	×	×	×	•	R1	•	•	•	•	•	R2	•	•	•	R1	R1	•	R2		5
Togo	×	×	•	•	×	R1	×	×	•	•	×	•	×	•	×	•	×	•	×	•	×	•	•	•		1
Tunisia	R1	•	•	•	R1	•	•	•	•	•	•	•	•	•	•	•	•	•	•	•	•	•	R2	•		3
Zambia	×	×	×	×	•	•	×	•	×	•	•	R1	•	•	•	R2	•	•	•	•	QF	•	•	•		3
Total (21 teams)	3	2	2	2	2	2	2	2	2	2	4	5	4	4	4	4	5	4	4	4	4	4	4	4	4	26

=== FIFA U-20 Women's World Cup ===
FIFA U-20 Women's World Cup record
Team	2002 (Canada) (12)	2004 (Thailand) (12)	2006 (Russia) (16)	2008 (Chile) (16)	2010 (Germany) (16)	2012 (Japan) (16)	2014 (Canada) (16)	2016 (Papua New Guinea) (16)	2018 (France) (16)	2022 (Costa Rica) (16) (Note: Costa Rica and Panama were originally due to host the 2020 FIFA U-20 Women's World Cup, but the latter withdrew citing the COVID-19 pandemic and left Costa Rica as the sole hosts. FIFA postponed the 2020 edition to the following year, i.e. 2021, pending improvement in pandemic management, but cancelled it altogether on 17 November 2020 due to the escalation of the pandemic caused by the discovery of the COVID-19 Omicron variant a month earlier and automatically awarded them the 2022 edition.)	2024 (Colombia) (24)	2026 (Poland) (24)	Apps.
Benin	•	•	•	•	•	•	•	•	•	•	•	R1	1
Cameroon	×	×	•	•	×	•	×	•	•	•	R2	•	1
DR Congo	×	•	R1	R1	•	•	×	•	×	•	•	•	2
Ghana	×	×	•	•	R1	R1	R1	R1	R1	R1	R1	R1	8
Morocco	•	•	•	×	×	•	•	×	•	•	R1	•	1
Nigeria	R1	QF	QF	QF	2nd	4th	2nd	R1	QF	QF	R2	QF	12
Tanzania	•	•	•	•	•	•	•	•	•	•	•	R1	1
Total (7 teams)	1	1	2	2	2	2	2	2	2	2	4	4	26

=== FIFA U-17 World Cup ===
FIFA U-17 World Cup record
Team	1985 (China) (16)	1987 (Canada) (16)	1989 (Scotland) (16)	1991 (Italy) (16)	1993 (Japan) (16)	1995 (Ecuador) (16)	1997 (Egypt) (16)	1999 (New Zealand) (16)	2001 (Trinidad and Tobago) (16)	2003 (Finland) (16)	2005 (Peru) (16)	2007 (South Korea) (24)	2009 (Nigeria) (24)	2011 (Mexico) (24)	2013 (United Arab Emirates) (24)	2015 (Chile) (24)	2017 (India) (24)	2019 (Brazil) (24) (Note: Original hosts Peru were stripped of the rights to host the 2019 edition in February that year.)	2023 (Indonesia) (24) (Note: Peru was originally due to host the 2021 FIFA U-17 World Cup but FIFA cancelled it on 24 December 2020 citing the COVID-19 pandemic and its escalation of the pandemic caused by the discovery of the COVID-19 Omicron variant a month earlier as the reasons and automatically awarded them the 2023 edition. Peru later withrew as hosts on 2 May 2023 due to infrastructural defects and FIFA awarded the hosting eights to Indonesia, whom FIFA earlier stripped the hosting rights for the year's FIFA U-20 World Cup.)	2025 (Qatar) (48)	2026 (Qatar) (48)	Apps.
Algeria	•	•	•	•	•	•	•	•	•	•	•	•	R1	•	•	•	•	•	•	•	Q	2
Angola	×	×	×	×	×	•	•	•	•	•	•	•	•	•	•	•	•	R2	×	•	•	1
Burkina Faso	•	•	•	•	•	•	•	R1	3rd	•	•	•	R2	R1	•	•	•	•	R1	QF	•	6
Cameroon	•	•	•	•	•	•	•	•	•	R1	•	•	•	•	•	•	•	R1	•	•	Q	3
Congo	R1	•	•	R1	•	•	•	•	•	•	•	•	•	R2	•	•	•	•	•	×	×	3
Egypt	•	R1	•	×	•	•	QF	•	×	•	×	•	×	•	×	•	•	×	•	R2	Q	4
Gambia	•	•	•	•	•	•	•	•	•	•	R1	•	R1	•	•	•	•	•	×	•	•	2
Ghana	•	•	R1	1st	2nd	1st	2nd	3rd	•	•	R1	4th	•	•	•	•	QF	•	•	•		9
Guinea	4th	•	R1	•	•	R1	•	•	•	•	•	•	•	•	•	R1	R1	×	×	×	•	6
Ivory Coast	•	3rd	•	•	•	•	•	•	•	•	R1	•	•	R2	QF	•	•	•	•	R1	Q	6
Malawi	•	•	•	•	•	•	•	•	•	•	•	•	R1	•	•	•	•	•	•	•	•	1
Mali	•	•	•	•	•	•	QF	R1	QF	•	•	•	•	•	•	2nd	4th	•	3rd	R3	Q	8
Morocco	•	•	•	•	•	•	•	•	•	•	•	•	•	•	R2	•	•	•	QF	QF	Q	4
Mozambique	•	•	•	•	•	•	•	•	•	•	•	•	•	•	•	•	•	•	•	•	Q	1
Niger	•	•	•	•	•	•	•	•	•	•	•	•	•	•	•	•	R2	•	•	•	•	1
Nigeria	1st	2nd	QF	•	1st	QF	•	•	2nd	R1	•	1st	2nd	•	1st	1st	•	R2	•	•	•	12
Rwanda	•	•	•	•	•	•	•	•	•	•	•	•	•	R1	•	•	•	•	×	×	•	1
Senegal	•	•	•	•	•	•	•	•	•	•	•	•	•	•	•	•	•	R2	R2	R2	Q	4
Sierra Leone	•	•	•	•	•	•	•	•	•	R1	•	•	•	•	•	•	•	•	•	•	•	1
South Africa	•	•	•	•	•	•	•	•	•	•	•	•	•	•	•	R1	•	•	•	R2	•	2
Sudan	•	•	•	R1	•	•	•	•	•	•	•	•	•	•	•	•	•	•	×	•	•	1
Tanzania	×	×	×	×	•	•	•	•	•	•	•	•	•	•	•	•	•	•	•	•	Q	1
Togo	•	•	•	•	•	•	•	•	•	•	•	R1	•	•	•	•	•	•	•	•	•	1
Tunisia	•	•	•	•	R1	•	•	•	•	•	•	R2	•	•	R2	•	•	•	•	R2	•	4
Uganda	•	•	×	×	•	×	•	•	•	•	•	•	•	•	•	•	•	•	•	R3	Q	2
Zambia	•	×	•	•	×	×	×	•	•	•	×	•	•	•	•	•	•	•	•	R2	•	1
Total (25 teams)	3	2	3	3	3	3	2	3	3	3	3	4	5	4	4	4	4	4	4	10	10	

=== FIFA U-17 Women's World Cup ===
FIFA U-17 Women's World Cup record
Team	2008 (New Zealand) (16)	2010 (Trinidad and Tobago) (16)	2012 (Azerbaijan) (16)	2014 (Costa Rica) (16)	2016 (Jordan) (16)	2018 (Uruguay) (16)	2022 (India) (16) (Note: India were originally due to host the 2020 FIFA U-17 Women's World Cup, but it was postponed to the following year, i.e. 2021, due to the COVID-19 pandemic by FIFA, who eventually cancelled it on 17 November 2020 and rather automatically awarded them the 2022 edition.)	2024 (Dominican Republic) (16)	2025 (Morocco) (24)	2026 (Morocco) (24)	2027 (Morocco) (24)	2028 (Morocco) (24)	2029 (Morocco) (24)	Apps.
Cameroon	•	×	•	×	R1	R1	•	•	R1	•				3
Gambia	×	×	R1	×	×	•	×	×	×	×				1
Ghana	R1	R1	3rd	QF	QF	QF	•	×	×	QF				7
Ivory Coast	×	×	×	×	×	×	×	×	R1	•				1
Kenya	×	×	•	×	×	×	×	R1	•	R2				2
Nigeria	R1	QF	QF	QF	R1	•	3rd	QF	R2	1st				9
South Africa	•	R1	•	•	•	R1	•	•	•	•				2
Morocco	×	×	×	×	•	•	R1	•	R2	R2	Q	Q	Q	6
Tanzania	×	×	×	×	×	×	QF	•	•	•				1
Zambia	•	×	•	R1	×	•	•	R1	R2	R1				4
Total (10 teams)	2	3	3	3	3	3	3	3	5	5	5	5	5	48

=== FIFA Futsal World Cup ===
FIFA Futsal World Cup record
Team	1989 (Netherlands) (16)	1992 (Hong Kong) (16)	1996 (Spain) (16)	2000 (Guatemala) (16)	2004 (Taiwan) (16)	2008 (Brazil) (20)	2012 (Thailand) (24)	2016 (Colombia) (24)	2021 (Lithuania) (24)	2024 (Uzbekistan) (24)	2028 (24)	Apps.
Algeria	R1	×	×	×	×	×	×	×	•	•		1
Angola	×	×	×	×	×	•	×	•	R1	R1		2
Egypt	×	×	R1	R2	R1	R1	R2	QF	R1	•		7
Libya	×	×	×	•	×	R1	R1	•	•	R1		3
Morocco	×	×	×	•	•	•	R1	R1	QF	QF		4
Mozambique	×	×	×	×	•	•	•	R1	•	•		1
Nigeria	×	R1	×	×	×	•	•	•	×	×		1
Zimbabwe	R1	×	•	×	×	×	•	×	×	×		1
Total (8 teams)	2	1	1	1	1	2	3	3	3	3		20

=== FIFA Beach Soccer World Cup ===
FIFA Beach Soccer World Cup record
Team	1995 (Brazil) (8)	1996 (Brazil) (8)	1997 (Brazil) (8)	1998 (Brazil) (10)	1999 (Brazil) (12)	2000 (Brazil) (12)	2001 (Brazil) (12)	2002 (Brazil) (8)	2003 (Brazil) (8)	2004 (Brazil) (12)	2005 (Brazil) (12)	2006 (Brazil) (12)	2007 (Brazil) (16)	2008 (France) (16)	2009 (United Arab Emirates) (16)	2011 (Italy) (16)	2013 (French Polynesia) (16)	2015 (Portugal) (16)	2017 (The Bahamas) (16)	2019 (Paraguay) (16)	2021 (Russia) (16)	2024 (United Arab Emirates) (16)	2025 (Seychelles) (16)	2027 (??)	Apps.
Cameroon	•	•	•	•	•	•	•	•	•	•	×	R1; 14th	•	R1; 16th	×	×	×	•	×	•	×	•	•		2/23
Egypt	•	•	•	•	•	•	•	•	•	•	×	•	•	•	•	•	•	•	•	•	•	R1; 12th	•		1/23
Ivory Coast	•	•	•	•	•	•	•	•	•	•	×	•	•	•	R1; 11th	•	R1; 16th	•	•	•	•	•	•		2/23
Madagascar	•	•	•	•	•	•	•	•	•	•	×	×	×	×	×	•	•	R1; 14th	•	•	•	•	×		1/23
Mauritania	×	×	×	×	×	×	×	×	×	×	×	×	×	×	×	×	×	×	×	×	×	×	R1		1/23
Mozambique	•	•	•	•	•	•	•	•	•	•	×	×	•	•	•	×	×	•	•	•	R1; 11th	•	•		1/23
Nigeria	•	•	•	•	•	•	•	•	•	•	×	R1; 9th	QF; 6th	•	R1; 12th	QF; 6th	•	•	R1; 12th	R1; 16th	×	•	•		6/23
Senegal	•	•	•	•	•	•	•	•	•	•	×	×	QF; 5th	R1; 9th	•	QF; 7th	R1; 13th	R1; 13th	QF; 6th	QF; 6th	4th	R1; 10th	4th		10/23
Seychelles	•	•	•	•	•	•	•	•	•	•	×	×	×	×	×	×	×	•	×	×	•	•	R1		1/23
South Africa	•	•	•	•	R1; 12th	•	•	•	•	•	R1; 12th	•	•	•	•	•	×	•	×	•	×	×	×		1/23
Total (10 teams)	0	0	0	0	1	0	0	0	0	0	1	2	2	2	2	2	2	2	2	2	2	2	3		

=== Former tournaments ===
==== FIFA Confederations Cup ====
FIFA Confederations Cup record
Team	1992 (Saudi Arabia) (4)	1995 (Saudi Arabia) (6)	1997 (Saudi Arabia) (8)	1999 (Mexico) (8)	2001 (South Korea) (Japan) (8)	2003 (France) (8)	2005 (Germany) (8)	2009 (South Africa) (8)	2013 (Brazil) (8)	2017 (Russia) (8)	Apps.
Cameroon	•	•	•	•	R1	2nd	•	•	•	R1	3
Egypt	•	•	•	R1	•	•	•	R1	•	•	2
Ivory Coast	4th	•	•	•	•	•	•	•	•	•	1
Nigeria	•	4th	×	×	•	•	•	•	R1	•	2
South Africa	×	•	R1	•	•	•	•	4th	•	•	2
Tunisia	•	•	•	•	•	•	R1	•	•	•	1
Total (6 teams)	1	1	1	1	1	1	1	2	1	1	11

== 2007 CAF Golden Jubilee Best Players ==
In 2007, CAF published the list of the top 30 African players who played in the 50 year-period from 1957 to 2007, as part of the celebration of the golden jubilee of the foundation of CAF, generated by an online poll.

Rank	Player	Nationality	Votes
1	Roger Milla	Cameroon	2246
2	Mahmoud El Khatib	Egypt	2165
3	Hossam Hassan	Egypt	2011
4	Samuel Eto'o	Cameroon	1840
5	Abedi Pele	Ghana	1783
6	George Weah	Liberia	1604
7	Didier Drogba	Ivory Coast	1467
8	Nwankwo Kanu	Nigeria	1209
9	Rabah Madjer	Algeria	1176
10	Kalusha Bwalya	Zambia	1073
11	Michael Essien	Ghana	996
12	Augustine Okocha	Nigeria	921
13	Saleh Selim	Egypt	850
14	Hacène Lalmas	Algeria	791
15	Benni McCarthy	South Africa	782
16	El Hadji Diouf	Senegal	711
17	Noureddine Naybet	Morocco	692
18	Rashidi Yekini	Nigeria	649
19	Hany Ramzy	Egypt	608
20	Hassan Shehata	Egypt	605
21	Lucas Radebe	South Africa	557
22	Tarak Dhiab	Tunisia	541
23	Mohammed Timoumi	Morocco	539
24	Tony Yeboah	Ghana	511
25	Salif Keita	Mali	368
26	Karim Abdul Razak	Ghana	430
27	Samuel Kuffour	Ghana	368
28	Lakhdar Belloumi	Algeria	305
29	Rigobert Song	Cameroon	283
30	Nasr Eddin Abbas	Sudan	202

== CAF resolutions ==
Awards:

- CAF Awards
- African Footballer of the Year
- African Women's Footballer of the Year
- CAF Clubs of the 20th Century

Qualifications:

- CAF 5-year ranking

== International top goalscorers ==
As of 7 July 2026

This table is for players with 30 or more goals for a CAF national team. Players in bold are still active at international level.

Indicates the CAF top scorer.
Indicates the top scorer of the respective nation.

Rank	Player	Nation	Goals	Matches	Goals per match	Career span
1	Godfrey Chitalu	Zambia	79	111	0.71	1968–1980
2	Kinnah Phiri	Malawi	71	117	0.61	1973–1981
3	**Mohamed Salah**	Egypt	70	124	0.56	2011–present
4	Hossam Hassan	Egypt	69	177	0.39	1985–2006
5	Didier Drogba	Ivory Coast	65	105	0.62	2002–2014
6	Samuel Eto'o	Cameroon	56	118	0.47	1997–2014
7	**Sadio Mané**	Senegal	55	132	0.42	2012–present
8	Asamoah Gyan	Ghana	51	109	0.47	2003–2021
9	Hassan El-Shazly	Egypt	49	64	0.77	1961–1975
10	Abdoulaye Traoré	Ivory Coast	49	90	0.54	1984–1996
11	Islam Slimani	Algeria	46	105	0.44	2012–2025
12	Edward Acquah	Ghana	45	41	1.1	1956–1964
13	**Vincent Aboubakar**	Cameroon	45	117	0.38	2010–present
14	Ali Al-Biski	Libya	44	35	1.26	1961–1970
15	Roger Milla	Cameroon	43	77	0.56	1973–1994
16	Alex Chola	Zambia	43	102	0.42	1975–1985
17	El-Sayed El-Dhizui	Egypt	41	50	0.82	1948–1960
18	Pierre-Emerick Aubameyang	Gabon	40	86	0.47	2009–2026
19	Fawzi Al-Issawi	Libya	40	90	0.44	1977–1985
20	Riyad Mahrez	Algeria	40	120	0.33	2014–2026
21	Akwá	Angola	39	78	0.5	1995–2006
22	Kalusha Bwalya	Zambia	39	87	0.45	1983–2006
23	Mohamed Aboutrika	Egypt	38	100	0.38	2001–2013
24	Rashidi Yekini	Nigeria	37	62	0.6	1984–1998
25	Peter Ndlovu	Zimbabwe	37	81	0.46	1991–2007
26	Kwasi Owusu	Ghana	36	52	0.69	1967–1977
27	Abdelhafid Tasfaout	Algeria	36	80	0.45	1990–2002
28	Issam Jemâa	Tunisia	36	84	0.43	2005–2014
29	Ahmed Faras	Morocco	36	94	0.38	1966–1979
30	**Victor Osimhen**	Nigeria	35	51	0.69	2017–present
31	William Ouma	Kenya	35	66	0.53	1965–1977
32	**Ayoub El Kaabi**	Morocco	35	72	0.49	2018–present
33	**Baghdad Bounedjah**	Algeria	35	86	0.41	2013–present
34	**Michael Olunga**	Kenya	34	69	0.49	2015–present
35	Dennis Oliech	Kenya	34	76	0.45	2002–2016
36	Moumouni Dagano	Burkina Faso	34	83	0.41	1998–2014
37	Flávio	Angola	34	91	0.37	2000–2012
38	**Jordan Ayew**	Ghana	34	124	0.27	2010–present
39	Patrick M'Boma	Cameroon	33	55	0.6	1995–2004
40	Ibrahima Kandia Diallo	Guinea	33	56	0.59	1960–1973
41	Getaneh Kebede	Ethiopia	33	66	0.5	2010–2022
42	Ahmed Hassan	Egypt	33	184	0.18	1995–2004
43	Emmanuel Adebayor	Togo	32	87	0.37	2000–2019
44	Benni McCarthy	South Africa	31	79	0.39	1997–2011
45	Amr Zaki	Egypt	30	63	0.48	2004–2013
46	Tico-Tico	Mozambique	30	94	0.32	1995–2010

== See also ==
- African nations at the FIFA World Cup
- Football in Africa
- History of CAF
- Oceania association football club records and statistics
- International Federation of Association Football (FIFA)
- Asian Football Confederation (AFC)
- Oceania Football Confederation (OFC)
- Confederation of North, Central America and Caribbean Association Football (CONCACAF)
- Confederation of South American Football (CONMEBOL)
- Union of European Football Associations (UEFA)
- List of association football competitions
- List of association football sub-confederations
- List of presidents of CAF
- List of first international of African national teams
- List of CAF club competition winners
- List of CAF club competition winning coaches
- List of African national football team managers
- Women's football in Africa
- List of top international men's football goal scorers by country
- List of men's footballers with 50 or more international goals
- List of men's footballers with 100 or more international caps
