= 2014 African U-20 Women's World Cup qualification =

2014 African U-20 Women's World Cup Qualifying Tournament
Tournament details
- Dates: September 2013 – 24 January 2014
- Teams: 17 (from 1 confederation)

Tournament statistics
- Matches played: 24
- Goals scored: 116 (4.83 per match)

The 2014 African U-20 Women's World Cup Qualifying Tournament was the 7th edition of the African U-20 Women's World Cup Qualifying Tournament, the biennial international youth football competition organised by the Confederation of African Football (CAF) to determine which women's under-20 national teams from Africa qualify for the FIFA U-20 Women's World Cup.

The tournament was played on a home and away knockout basis between September 2013 and 24 January 2014. 17 teams entered the competition, although Egypt withdrew before playing a match. The top two teams of the tournament Ghana and Nigeria qualified for the 2014 FIFA U-20 Women's World Cup in Canada as the CAF representatives.

== Participants ==
The Confederation of African Football invited all national teams, needing confirmation of participation by 14 July 2013. Eventually 17 teams entered the competition.

== Preliminary round ==
Uganda's 13–0 return leg win was a tournament record for the African qualifiers.

Team 1	Agg.	Team 2	1st leg	2nd leg
South Sudan	0–22	Uganda	0–9	0–13

South Sudan	0−9	Uganda

Uganda	13−0	South Sudan

Uganda won 22−0 on aggregate and advanced to the first round.

== First round ==
Nigeria was drawn to play Burkina Faso this round, but after Burkina Faso withdrew they were paired against Sierra Leone.

Team 1	Agg.	Team 2	1st leg	2nd leg
Nigeria	16–0	Sierra Leone	10–0	6–0
Morocco	1–8	Tunisia	0–4	1–4
Tanzania	15–1	Mozambique	10–0	5–1
Botswana	2–7	South Africa	2–5	0–2
Namibia	0–3	Zambia	0–1	0–2
Ivory Coast	2–6	Equatorial Guinea	0–4	2–2
Egypt	w/o^{1}	Uganda	—	—
Ghana	w/o^{2}	Guinea-Bissau	—	—

- ^{1}: Egypt withdrew from their match against Uganda.
- ^{2}: Guinea-Bissau withdrew from their match against Ghana.

== Second round ==
Played on weekends of 6 and 20 December 2013.

Team 1	Agg.	Team 2	1st leg	2nd leg
Nigeria	8–0	Tunisia	4–0	4–0
Tanzania	1–9	South Africa	1–4	0–5
Zambia	0–6	Equatorial Guinea	0–2	0–4
Uganda	w/o^{1}	Ghana	—	—

- ^{1}: Uganda withdrew from their match against Ghana for financial reasons.

== Third round ==
Played on weekends of 10 and 24 January 2014. Nigeria qualified for the seventh time in as many attempts. Ghana qualifies for the third time in a row.

Team 1	Agg.	Team 2	1st leg	2nd leg
Nigeria	7–0	South Africa	6–0	1–0
Equatorial Guinea	1–1 (3–4 p)	Ghana	1–0	0–1

== Qualified teams for FIFA U-20 Women's World Cup ==
The following two teams from CAF qualified for the FIFA U-20 Women's World Cup.

Team	Qualified on	Previous appearances in tournament
Ghana	24 January 2014	2 (2010, 2012)
Nigeria	24 January 2014	6 (2002, 2004, 2006, 2008, 2010, 2012)
