= Uganda women's national under-20 football team =

Uganda's U20 women national association football team

Uganda Under-20
- Nickname: The Crested Cranes
- Association: Federation of Uganda Football Associations (FUFA)
- Confederation: CAF (Africa)
- Sub-confederation: CECAFA (East & Central Africa)
- FIFA code: UGA
First colours	Second colours

African U-20 World Cup qualification
- Appearances: 2 (first in 2022)
- Best result: Semi-finals (2022)

FIFA U-20 Women's World Cup
- Appearances: None

The Uganda women's national under-20 football team is an association football team that represents Uganda women at the under-20 level. It came into existence in September 2013. It is also known as " The Queen Cranes".

The team finished in 2nd place in the first edition of the CECAFA Women's U-20 Championship.

== Pathway Transitions ==
The pathway transitions for the Uganda women's national under-20 football team are structured by the FUFA and primarily involve moving players through various youth national teams, local clubs/academies, and into the senior national team, the Crested Cranes, or international professional leagues.

== Competitive record ==
Uganda women's national under-20 football team managed by FUFA. It came into existence in September 2013 and eliminated South Sudan 22-0 on aggregate but unfortunately, the Federation executive decided to pull out the team from the qualifiers due to inadequate funds.

The Queens completed their double victory over Namibia in the FIFA U-20 Women's World Cup Qualifiers at the FUFA Stadium Kadiba. The Queens Cranes against Namibia ended in a 5.0 win on average the first leg ended 3-0 and the second leg ended 2.0 .

Champions Runners-up Third place Fourth place

- Red border color indicates tournament was held on home soil.

=== FIFA U-20 Women's World Cup ===
FIFA U-20 Women's World Cup
Year	Result	Position	Pld	W	D	L	GF	GA
(Canada) 2002	Did not qualify							
(Thailand) 2004	Did not qualify							
(Russia) 2006	Did not qualify							
(Chile) 2008	Did not qualify							
(Germany) 2010	Did not qualify							
(Japan) 2012	Did not qualify							
(Canada) 2014	Did not qualify							
(Papua New Guinea) 2016	Did not qualify							
(France) 2018	Did not qualify							
(Costa Rica) 2022	Did not qualify							
(Colombia) 2024	Did not qualify							
(Poland) 2026	To be determined							
Total		0/12						

=== African U-20 Women's World Cup qualification ===
African U-20 Women's World Cup qualification
Appearances: 2
Year	Round	Pld	W	D	L	GF	GA
2002	Did not enter						
2004	Did not enter						
2006	Did not enter						
2008	Did not enter						
2010	Did not enter						
2012	Did not enter						
2014	Did not enter						
2015	Did not enter						
2018	Did not enter						
2020	Cancelled						
2022	Round 4	6	3	1	2	12	10
2024	To be determined						
Total	1/11	6	3	1	2	12	10

== Current Squad ==
FUFA confirmed a 32-player squad for the Uganda women's national under-20 football team, ahead of their FIFA U-20 Women's World Cup Qualifier doubleheader against Namibia, which was scheduled on 19th and 22nd September 2025, with Uganda keen to take a positive step towards qualifying for the prestigious global tournament. The team, under the guidance of Head coach Sheryl Ulanda Botes, presented the following players for the team.

=== Goalkeepers ===
- Nakiirya Lillian (St. Noa Girls WFC)
- Atieno Elizabeth (Amus College WFC)
- Adeke Angella (Amus College School)
- Nambuya Josephine (Kawempe Muslim Ladies FC)
- Among Ruth (St. Mary’s Magdaline SS)
- Chebet Charity (Shammah Queens FC)

=== Defenders ===
- Natooro Desire Katasi (Kenya Police Bullets FC)
- Kaluya Bethany Lois M. N. (London City Lioness)
- Anomo Barbra (St. Noa Girls WFC)
- Namboozo Hasifah Patricia (Makerere University WFC)
- Babirye Martha (El Cambio Academy)
- Babirye Patricia (Bunya Secondary School)
- Mukula Adong Mebel (Kawempe Muslim Ladies FC)
- Asiimwe Zidah (Boni Consilli Girls Voc)
- Kadondi Ritah (UCU Lady Cardinals FC)
- Akanya Sumaya (St. Mary’s Magdaline SS)

=== Midfielders ===
- Nambozo Zabinah (Amus College WFC)
- Namataka Mariam (Amus College WFC)
- Najjuma Shamusa (Kampala Queens FC)
- Kasemire Imelda (St. Noa Girls WFC)
- Nabukenya Agnes (Kawempe Muslim LFC)
- Nangendo Esther (Kawempe Muslim LFC)
- Nayiga Patricia (St. Noa Girls WFC)
- Kisakye Dorcus (Kawempe Muslim LFC)
- Nalumu Sumaya (Kampala Queens FC)
- Aujat Doreen (Amus College WFC)
- Nanono Monica (Kawempe Muslim LFC)
- Atyrionimungu Vicky (Amus College WFC)

=== Forwards ===
- Kabene Sylvia (St. Noa Girls WFC)
- Katono Mary (She Corporate FC)
- Nalukwago Yasmeen (Rines SS WFC)
- Muduwa Peace (Kampala Queens FC)

== See also ==
- Uganda women's national football team
- England women's national under-20 football team
