= 2008 African U-20 Women's World Cup qualification =

4th FIFA U-20 Women's World Cup qualification for African nations

Tournament details
- Dates: 13 January – 14 June 2008
- Teams: 16 (from 1 confederation)

Tournament statistics
- Matches played: 18
- Goals scored: 64 (3.56 per match)

The Confederation of African Football (CAF) organized qualification matches for the 2008 FIFA U-20 Women's World Cup in Chile for its member nations between 13 January and 14 June 2008. At the conclusion of qualification, DR Congo and Nigeria booked their spots at the international tournament as CAF representatives.

== Preliminary round ==
Team 1	Agg.	Team 2	1st leg	2nd leg
Ghana	7–0	Guinea	4–0	3–0
Lesotho	2–4	Botswana	1–1	1–3
Zambia	3–3 (a)	Egypt	2–2	1–1
South Africa	7–1	Mozambique	4–0	3–1
Cameroon	w/o	Benin	—	—
Nigeria	w/o	Congo	—	—
Namibia	w/o	DR Congo	—	—
Zimbabwe	w/o	Mauritius	—	—

Ghana	4–0	Guinea

Guinea	0–3	Ghana

Ghana won 7−0 on aggregate and advanced to the first round.

Lesotho	1–1	Botswana

Botswana	3–1	Lesotho

Botswana won 4−2 on aggregate and advanced to the first round.

Zambia	2–2	Egypt

Egypt	1–1	Zambia

Egypt won 3−3 on aggregate via the away goals rule and advanced to the first round.

South Africa	4–0	Mozambique

Mozambique	1–3	South Africa

South Africa won 7−1 on aggregate and advanced to the first round.

Cameroon	w/o	Benin

Cameroon won on walkover and advanced to the first round after Benin failed to appear for the first leg .

Nigeria	w/o	Congo

Nigeria won on walkover and advanced to the first round after Congo failed to appear for the first leg.

Namibia	w/o	DR Congo

DR Congo won on walkover and advanced to the first round after Namibia failed to appear for the first leg.

Zimbabwe	w/o	Mauritius

Zimbabwe won on walkover and advanced to the first round after Mauritius failed to appear for the first leg.

== First round ==
The First Round matches were played from 4 to 20 April 2008.

Team 1	Agg.	Team 2	1st leg	2nd leg
Nigeria	4–0	Cameroon	1–0	3–0
Botswana	4–10	Ghana	4–1	0–9
DR Congo	5–1	Egypt	2–0	3–1
South Africa	w/o	Mauritius	—	—

Nigeria	1–0	Cameroon

Cameroon	0–3	Nigeria

Nigeria won 4−0 on aggregate and advanced to the second round.

Botswana	4–1	Ghana

Ghana	9–0	Botswana

Ghana won 10−4 on aggregate and advanced to the second round.

DR Congo	2–0	Egypt

Egypt	1–3	DR Congo

DR Congo won 5−1 on aggregate and advanced to the second round.

South Africa	w/o	Mauritius

South Africa won on walkover and advanced to the second round after Mauritius failed to appear for the first leg.

== Second round ==
The Second Round was played from 30 May to 18 June 2008. The winners of both two-legged ties have qualified directly to the 2008 FIFA U-20 Women's World Cup.

Team 1	Agg.	Team 2	1st leg	2nd leg
Ghana	2–5	Nigeria	2–3	0–2
South Africa	3–3 (a)	DR Congo	3–1	0–2

Ghana	2–3	Nigeria

Nigeria	2–0	Ghana

Nigeria qualified by winning 5−2 on aggregate.

South Africa	3–1	DR Congo

DR Congo	2–0	South Africa

DR Congo qualified by winning via the away goals rule 3−3 on aggregate.

== Qualified teams for the 2008 FIFA U-20 Women's World Cup ==
The following teams from CAF qualified for the 2008 FIFA U-20 Women's World Cup.

Team	Qualified on	Previous FIFA U-20 Women's World Championship appearances
DR Congo	14 June 2008	1 (2006)
Nigeria	18 June 2008	3 (2002, 2004, 2006)
