= Benin women's national under-20 football team =

Benin Under-20
- Association: Benin Football Federation
- Confederation: CAF (Africa)
- Sub-confederation: WAFU (West Africa)
- FIFA code: BEN
First colours	Second colours

African U-20 World Cup qualification
- Appearances: 3 (first in 2006)
- Best result: Qualified for World Cup (2026)

FIFA U-20 Women's World Cup
- Appearances: 1 (first in 2026)
- Best result: Group stage (2026)

The Benin women's national under-20 football team represents Benin in international youth women's football competitions.

The team qualified for the 2022 WAFU U20 Women's Cup in Ghana.

== Competitive record ==
=== FIFA U-20 Women's World Cup ===
Year	Result	Pld	W	D	L	GF	GA	Squad
(Canada) 2002	Did not qualify							
(Thailand) 2004	Did not qualify							
(Russia) 2006	Did not qualify							
(Chile) 2008	Did not qualify							
(Germany) 2010	Did not qualify							
(Japan) 2012	Did not qualify							
(Canada) 2014	Did not qualify							
(Papua New Guinea) 2016	Did not qualify							
(France) 2018	Did not qualify							
(Costa Rica) 2022	Did not qualify							
(Colombia) 2024	Did not qualify							
(Poland) 2026	Group stage	3	0	1	2	3	14	Squad
Total:1/12	Group stage	3	0	1	2	3	14	-

== Head-to-head record ==
The following table shows Benin's head-to-head record in the FIFA U-20 Women's World Cup.

Opponent	Pld	W	D	L	GF	GA	GD	Win %
Argentina	1	0	0	1	0	8	−8	0.00
Mexico	1	0	1	0	2	2	+0	0.00
Poland	1	0	0	1	1	4	−3	0.00
Total	3	0	1	2	3	14	−11	0.00

== See also ==
- Benin women's national football team
