= Burundi women's national under-20 football team =

Burundi Under-20
- Nickname(s): Swallows (Hirondelles)
- Association: Football Federation of Burundi
- Sub-confederation: CECAFA (East & Central Africa)
- FIFA code: BDI
First colours	Second colours

African U-20 World Cup qualification
- Appearances: 3 (first in 2018)
- Best result: 4th Round (2024)

FIFA U-20 Women's World Cup
- Appearances: None

The Burundi women's national under-20 football team represents Burundi in international youth women's football competitions.

The team finished in 4th place in the first edition of the CECAFA Women's U-20 Championship.

== Competitive record ==
=== FIFA U-20 Women's World Cup record ===
FIFA U-20 Women's World Cup
Year	Result	Matches	Wins	Draws*	Losses	GF	GA
(Canada) 2002	Did not qualify						
(Thailand) 2004	Did not qualify						
(Russia) 2006	Did not qualify						
(Chile) 2008	Did not qualify						
(Germany) 2010	Did not qualify						
(Japan) 2012	Did not qualify						
(Canada) 2014	Did not qualify						
(Papua New Guinea) 2016	Did not qualify						
(France) 2018	Did not qualify						
(Costa Rica) 2022	Did not qualify						
(Colombia) 2024	Did not qualify						
(Poland) 2026	To be determined						
Total	0/12	0	0	0	0	0	0

=== African U-20 Women's World Cup qualification ===
African U-20 Women's World Cup qualification
Appearances: 7
Year	Round	Pld	W	D	L	GF	GA
2002	Did not enter						
2004	Did not enter						
2006	Did not enter						
2008	Did not enter						
2010	Did not enter						
2012	Did not enter						
2014	Did not enter						
2015	Did not enter						
2018	Round 2	6	5	0	1	10	6
2020	Cancelled						
2022	Round 3	4	2	1	1	8	4
2024	Round 5	6	1	2	3	5	7
2026	To be determined						
Total	4/12	16	8	3	4	23	17

== See also ==
- Burundi women's national football team
