= Niger women's national under-20 football team =

Women's national under-20 football team representing Niger

Niger Under-20
- Association: Nigerien Football Federation
- Confederation: CAF (Africa)
- Sub-confederation: WAFU (West Africa)
- FIFA code: NIG
| First colours | Second colours |

African U-20 World Cup qualification
- Appearances: 4 (first in 2002)
- Best result: Quarter-finals (2002)

The Niger women's national under-20 football team represents Niger in international youth women's football competitions.

The team qualified for the 2022 WAFU U20 Women's Cup held in Ghana.

== Fixtures and results ==
Legend

Win Draw Lose Fixture

== Competitive record ==
=== FIFA U-20 Women's World Cup record ===
FIFA U-20 Women's World Cup
| Year | Result | Matches | Wins | Draws* | Losses | GF | GA |
|---|---|---|---|---|---|---|---|
| (Canada) 2002 | Did not qualify | | | | | | |
| (Thailand) 2004 | Did not qualify | | | | | | |
| (Russia) 2006 | Did not qualify | | | | | | |
| (Chile) 2008 | Did not qualify | | | | | | |
| (Germany) 2010 | Did not qualify | | | | | | |
| (Japan) 2012 | Did not qualify | | | | | | |
| (Canada) 2014 | Did not qualify | | | | | | |
| (Papua New Guinea) 2016 | Did not qualify | | | | | | |
| (France) 2018 | Did not qualify | | | | | | |
| (Costa Rica) 2022 | Did not qualify | | | | | | |
| (Colombia) 2024 | Did not qualify | | | | | | |
| (Poland) 2026 | Did not qualify | | | | | | |
| Total | 0/12 | 0 | 0 | 0 | 0 | 0 | 0 |

== See also ==
- Niger women's national football team
- Niger women's national under-17 football team
