= Togo women's national under-20 football team =

Togo Under-20
- Nickname: Les Éperviers Dames
- Association: Togolese Football Federation (FTF)
- Confederation: CAF (Africa)
- Sub-confederation: WAFU (West Africa)
- FIFA code: TOG
First colours	Second colours

African U-20 World Cup qualification
- Appearances: 1 (first in 2024)
- Best result: Preliminary Round (2024)

The Togo women's national under-20 football team represents Togo in international youth women's football competitions.

The team qualified for the 2022 WAFU U20 Women's Cup to be held in Ghana.

== Competitive record ==
=== FIFA U-20 Women's World Cup record ===
FIFA U-20 Women's World Cup
Year	Result	Matches	Wins	Draws*	Losses	GF	GA
(Canada) 2002	Did not qualify						
(Thailand) 2004	Did not qualify						
(Russia) 2006	Did not qualify						
(Chile) 2008	Did not qualify						
(Germany) 2010	Did not qualify						
(Japan) 2012	Did not qualify						
(Canada) 2014	Did not qualify						
(Papua New Guinea) 2016	Did not qualify						
(France) 2018	Did not qualify						
(Costa Rica) 2022	Did not qualify						
(Colombia) 2024	Did not qualify						
(Poland) 2026	To be determined						
Total	1/12	0	0	0	0	0	0

== See also ==
- Togo women's national football team
