= Oceanian association football club records and statistics =

This article details men's professional association football club records and statistics in Oceania.

== All competitions for men's Oceanian football clubs ==
Infobox of all club competitions (excluding regional and pre-season friendly / invitational tournaments)

National club competitions			Intercontinental / worldwide club competitions	
League	National Cup	Super Cup	FIFA Club World Cup (2000–)	FIFA Intercontinental Cup (2024–)
			FIFA club competition	

Oceanian club competitions
Club Campionship / Champions League (1987–2006 / 2007–)	Cup Winners' Cup (1987)	President's Cup (2014)	Professional League (2026–)
OFC club competition		OFC club competition	

== Individual records ==
=== Most goals in a season in all club competitions ===
Only the period starting from the implementation of the modern offside rule in 1925 is considered for this list. Under the revised offside rule introduced in 1925, a player would be deemed offside unless there were two opposing players (including the goalkeeper) positioned ahead of them.

Abbreviations
NL	≙	National League
NC	≙	National Cup
SC	≙	Super Cup
OCL	≙	OFC Club Campionship / OFC Champions League
OPL	≙	OFC Professional League
OCWC	≙	Oceania Cup Winners' Cup
OPC	≙	OFC President's Cup
IC	≙	Intercontinental Cup
FCWC	≙	FIFA Club World Cup

Key
	Number of goals scored in a national club competition
	Number of goals scored in a European club competition
	Number of goals scored in an intercontinental / worldwide club competition
Player (X)	Denotes the number of times the player had scored 25 or more goals in a season at that time

- The list refers to goals in all national club competitions (top division), all Oceanian club competitions organized by OFC (including all OFC preliminary and qualifying rounds) and all intercontinental / worldwide club competitions (excluding the International Champions Cup)
- Does not include goals scored in regional competitions, in pre-season friendly / invitational tournaments and international goals in the national team

=== Most goals in a season ===
In the 2020–21 season, Joses Nawo became the player with the most goals scored in a single season with 35 goals for the Henderson Eels. He passed Sasho Petrovski's tally of 34 goals from the 2000–01 season.

List of most goals in a season in all club competitions (50 or more goals)
Rank	Player	Nationality	Goals	Itemized Goals	Club	Season	Reference
1	Joses Nawo	Solomon Islands	35	(35) NL	(Solomon Islands) Henderson Eels	2020–21	

Rank	Player	Nationality	Goals	Club	Season	League	Cup	International (Note: OFC Champions League)	Other
1	Joses Nawo	Solomon Islands	35	(Solomon Islands) Henderson Eels	2020–21	35	0	**	-
2	Sasho Petrovski	Australia	34	(Australia) Wollongong Wolves	2000–01	21	*	13	-
3	Raphael Lea'i	Solomon Islands	33	(Solomon Islands) Henderson Eels	2020–21	33	0	**	-
4	Damian Mori	Australia	31	(Australia) Adelaide City	1995–96	31	0	-	-
4	Tino Vaifale	American Samoa	31	(American Samoa) Ilaoa & To'omata	2022	31	0	**	-
6	Petuliki Poula	American Samoa	30	(American Samoa) Vaiala Tongan	2021	30	*	**	-
7	Mark Viduka	Australia	27	(Australia) Melbourne Knights	1994–95	21	6	**	-
8	Gagame Feni	Solomon Islands	26	(Solomon Islands) Laugu United (Solomon Islands) Solomon Warriors	2020–21	26	0	**	-
Minimum 25 goals

- All records happened while the players' clubs in top-flight domestic league
- *: No domestic cup competition held
- **: No Oceania football competition

== Club records ==
=== Most national league titles ===
Titles	Club	Period (first and last title)
26	(Tuvalu) Nauti F.C.	1980–2023
21	(Fiji) Ba	1977–2019
21	(French Polynesia) Central Sport	1955–2018
20	(Cook Islands) Tupapa Maraerenga	1992–2025
16	(Tonga) Lotohaʻapai United	1998–2018
15	(Vanuatu) Tafea	1891–2025
14	(Cook Islands) Titikaveka	1950–1984
12	(New Caledonia) AS Magenta	2003–2023
12	(French Polynesia) Pirae	1989–2024
11	(French Polynesia) Vénus	1953–2025
10	(New Zealand) Auckland City	2005–2024
10	(Papua New Guinea) PNG Hekari	2006–2024

=== Most consecutive national league titles ===
- 15 – Tafea (1994–2009)
- 11 – Lotohaʻapai United (1998–2008)
- 11 – Nauti (1980–1990)
- 10 – Nauti (2007–2016)
- 9 – Titikaveka (1971–1979)
- 8 – Hekari United (2006–2014)
- 8 – Central Sport (1972–1979)

=== Highest goal margin in Oceania Club Championship ===
- 16 – Central United 16–0 Lotoha'apai in 1999 Oceania Club Championship
- 16 – Lotoha'apai 0–16 Wollongong Wolves in 2001 Oceania Club Championship
