= South Sudan women's national under-20 football team =

South Sudan Under-20
- Association: South Sudan Football Association (SSFA)
- Confederation: CAF (Africa)
- Sub-confederation: CECAFA (East & Central Africa)
- FIFA code: SSD
First colours	Second colours

African U-20 World Cup qualification
- Appearances: 2 (first in 2014)
- Best result: TBD

FIFA U-20 Women's World Cup
- Appearances: None

The South Sudan women's national under-20 football team represents South Sudan in international youth women's football competitions. Its primary role is the development of players in preparation for the senior women's national team. The team competes in a variety of competitions, including the biennial African U-20 Women's World Cup qualification, which is the top competitions for this age group.

== Competitive record ==
=== FIFA U-20 Women's World Cup record ===
FIFA U-20 Women's World Cup
Year	Result	Matches	Wins	Draws*	Losses	GF	GA
(Canada) 2002	Did not exist; Part of Sudan						
(Thailand) 2004	Did not exist; Part of Sudan						
(Russia) 2006	Did not exist; Part of Sudan						
(Chile) 2008	Did not exist; Part of Sudan						
(Germany) 2010	Did not exist; Part of Sudan						
(Japan) 2012	Did not enter						
(Canada) 2014	Did not qualify						
(Papua New Guinea) 2016	Did not enter						
(France) 2018	Did not enter						
(Costa Rica) 2022	Did not qualify						
(Colombia) 2024	Did not qualify						
(Poland) 2026	To be determined						
Total	0/3	0	0	0	0	0	0

== See also ==
- South Sudan women's national football team
- South Sudan women's national under-17 football team
