= 2020 African U-20 Women's World Cup qualification =

2020 African U-20 Women's World Cup Qualifying Tournament
Tournament details
- Dates: 17 January – 2 February 2020 (remaining matches cancelled)
- Teams: 29 (from 1 confederation)

Tournament statistics
- Matches played: 24
- Goals scored: 94 (3.92 per match)
- Top scorer: (Guinea-Bissau) Fatumata (7 goals)

The 2020 African U-20 Women's World Cup Qualifying Tournament was the 10th edition of the African U-20 Women's World Cup Qualifying Tournament, the biennial international youth football competition organised by the Confederation of African Football (CAF) to determine which women's under-20 national teams from Africa qualify for the FIFA U-20 Women's World Cup. Players born on or after 1 January 2000 were eligible to compete in the tournament.

Two teams would have qualified from this tournament for the 2021 FIFA U-20 Women's World Cup (originally 2020 but postponed due to COVID-19 pandemic) in Costa Rica as the CAF representatives. However, FIFA announced on 17 November 2020 that this edition of the World Cup would be cancelled. As a result, all remaining qualifying matches were cancelled.

== Draw ==
A total of 29 (out of 54) CAF member national teams entered the qualifying rounds. The draw was held on 4 December 2019 at the CAF headquarters in Cairo, Egypt. The draw procedures were as follows:

- In the preliminary round, the 26 teams were drawn into 13 ties, with teams divided into five pots based on their geographical zones and those in the same pot drawn to play against each other.
- In the first round, the 13 preliminary round winners and the three teams receiving byes to the first round were allocated into eight ties based on the preliminary round tie numbers, with three preliminary round winners playing against the three teams receiving byes, and the other ten preliminary round winners playing against each other.
- In the second round, the eight first round winners were allocated into four ties based on the first round tie numbers.
- In the third round, the four second round winners were allocated into two ties based on the second round tie numbers.

Bye to first round (3 teams)	Preliminary round entrants (26 teams)				
Bye to first round (3 teams)	Pot A (3 from UNAF + 1 from CECAFA)	Pot B (3 from UNIFFAC + 1 from COSAFA)	Pot C (7 from WAFU A + 1 from WAFU B)	Pot D (4 from CECAFA)	Pot E (6 from COSAFA)
Cameroon; Ghana; Nigeria	Algeria; Egypt; Morocco; South Sudan	Congo; DR Congo; Gabon; Angola	Gambia; Guinea; Guinea-Bissau; Liberia; Mauritania; Senegal; Sierra Leone; Burkina Faso	Burundi; Ethiopia; Tanzania; Uganda	Botswana; Malawi; Namibia; South Africa; Zambia; Zimbabwe

Notes

- Teams in **bold** qualified for the World Cup.
- (W): Withdrew after draw

Did not enter

- Benin
- Cape Verde
- Central African Republic
- Chad
- Comoros
- Djibouti
- Equatorial Guinea
- Eritrea
- Eswatini
- Ivory Coast
- Kenya
- Lesotho
- Libya
- Madagascar
- Mali
- Mauritius
- Mozambique
- Niger
- Rwanda
- São Tomé and Príncipe
- Seychelles
- Somalia
- Sudan
- Togo
- Tunisia

== Format ==
Qualification ties were played on a home-and-away two-legged basis. If the aggregate score was tied after the second leg, the away goals rule was applied, and if still tied, the penalty shoot-out (no extra time) was used to determine the winner.

== Schedule ==
The schedule of the qualifying rounds was as follows.

Due to the COVID-19 pandemic, all first round matches, originally scheduled for 20–22 and 27–29 March 2020, had been postponed until further notice. The CAF announced the new dates in July 2020. However, on 15 August 2020, CAF announced that all first round matches, rescheduled for 3–5 and 10–12 September 2020, were again postponed due to travel restrictions across parts of Africa as a result of COVID-19. The CAF sent a letter to the member associations on 21 December 2020 confirming the cancellation of the qualifiers.

Round	Leg	Date
Preliminary round	First leg	17–19 January 2020
Preliminary round	Second leg	31 January–2 February 2020
First round	First leg	20–22 March 2020, postponed to 3–5 September 2020, eventually cancelled
First round	Second leg	27–29 March 2020, postponed to 10–12 September 2020, eventually cancelled
Second round	First leg	24–26 April 2020, postponed to 2–4 October 2020, eventually cancelled
Second round	Second leg	8–10 May 2020, postponed to 9–11 October 2020, eventually cancelled
Third round	First leg	29–31 May 2020, postponed to 6–8 November 2020, eventually cancelled
Third round	Second leg	19–21 June 2020, postponed to 13–15 November 2020, eventually cancelled

== Bracket ==
The two winners of the third round would have qualified for the 2021 FIFA U-20 Women's World Cup.

Preliminary round
Egypt	3	1	4
Morocco	5	3	8
South Sudan	0	0	0
Algeria	5	4	9
Gabon	—	—	w/o
DR Congo	—	—
Congo	2	4	6
Angola	0	2	2
Liberia	3	4	7
Guinea	0	5	5
Burkina Faso	3	0	3
Gambia	2	0	2

First round
Morocco
Algeria
Gabon
Congo
Liberia
Cameroon
Burkina Faso
Nigeria

Second round
Winner 14
Winner 15
Winner 16
Winner 17

Third round
Winner 22
Winner 23

Preliminary round
Mauritania	0	0	0
Guinea-Bissau	6	9	15
Sierra Leone	0	0	0
Senegal	1	0	1
Tanzania	2	2	4
Uganda	1	1	2
Burundi	0	1	1
Ethiopia	5	2	7
Malawi	1	0	1
Zimbabwe	1	1	2
Namibia	0	0	0
Botswana	7	2	9
Zambia	0	2	2
South Africa	2	2	4

First round
Guinea-Bissau
Ghana
Senegal
Tanzania
Ethiopia
Zimbabwe
Botswana
South Africa

Second round
Winner 18
Winner 19
Winner 20
Winner 21

Third round
Winner 24
Winner 25

== Preliminary round ==
Team 1	Agg.	Team 2	1st leg	2nd leg
Egypt	4–8	Morocco	3–5	1–3
South Sudan	0–9	Algeria	0–5	0–4
Gabon	w/o	DR Congo	—	—
Congo	6–2	Angola	2–0	4–2
Liberia	7–5	Guinea	3–0	4–5
Burkina Faso	3–2	Gambia	3–2	0–0
Mauritania	0–15	Guinea-Bissau	0–6	0–9
Sierra Leone	0–1	Senegal	0–1	0–0
Tanzania	4–2	Uganda	2–1	2–1
Burundi	1–7	Ethiopia	0–5	1–2
Malawi	1–2	Zimbabwe	1–1	0–1
Namibia	0–9	Botswana	0–7	0–2
Zambia	2–4	South Africa	0–2	2–2

17 January 2020
14:30 UTC+2

Egypt	3–5	Morocco
Ghazi 32' (pen.); Emad 52'; Nadda 66'	Report (Soccerway)	Barchi 6'; Redouani 37' (pen.); Brima 38'; Banouk 50'; Ahmamou 90'

Petro Sport Stadium, Cairo
Referee: Lamia Atman (Algeria)
2 February 2020
15:00 UTC+1

Morocco	3–1	Egypt
Ahmamou 5', 50'; Tayar 37'	Report (Soccerway)	Ghazi 72'

Stade Boubker Ammar, Salé
Referee: Dorsaf Ganouati (Tunisia)

Morocco won 8–4 on aggregate.

19 January 2020
16:00 UTC+3

South Sudan	0–5	Algeria
	Report (Soccerway)	Hamidèche 18'; Bahri 35'; Nefidsa 40'; Ayadi 68'; Kennouche 80'

Startimes Stadium, Kampala (Uganda) (Note: South Sudan played their home match outside the country due to renovation of Juba Stadium.)
2 February 2020
18:00 UTC+1

Algeria	4–0	South Sudan
Nefidsa 7', 54'; Bakhti 30' (pen.); Ournani 34'	Report (Soccerway)

Stade du 20 Août, Algiers

Algeria won 9–0 on aggregate.

18 January 2020
15:30 UTC+1

Gabon	Cancelled	DR Congo
	Report (Soccerway)

Stade Augustin Monédan de Sibang, Libreville
31 January 2020
--:-- UTC+1

DR Congo	Cancelled	Gabon
	Report (Soccerway)

Gabon won on walkover after DR Congo did not appear for the first leg.

19 January 2020
15:30 UTC+1

Congo	2–0	Angola
Senga 55'; Dzoussi 90+3'	Report (Soccerway)

Stade Alphonse Massemba-Débat, Brazzaville
2 February 2020
16:00 UTC+1

Angola	2–4	Congo
Alima 22'; Madó 90+3'	Report (Soccerway)	Dembélé 25', 35' (pen.); Senga 59'; Massoumou 85'

Estádio dos Coqueiros, Luanda
Attendance: 1,500
Referee: Akhona Makalima (South Africa)

Congo won 6–2 on aggregate.

19 January 2020
16:00 UTC+0

Liberia	3–0	Guinea
Nimene 4', 15' (pen.), 51' (pen.)	Report (Soccerway)

Antoinette Tubman Stadium, Monrovia
Referee: Theresa Bremansu (Ghana)
1 February 2020
16:00 UTC+0

Guinea	5–4	Liberia
Cissé 5'; Camara 23' (pen.), 52' (pen.); Sidibé 27'; Touah 90+4' (o.g.)	Report (Soccerway)	Nimene 1'; Agbotsu 26'; Kikeh 66', 82'

Stade du 28 Septembre, Conakry
Referee: Isatou Touray (Gambia)

Liberia won 7–5 on aggregate.

18 January 2020
16:00 UTC+0

Burkina Faso	3–2	Gambia
Congo 34'; Goungounga 37'; Kaboré 53'	Report (Soccerway)	Jatta 42'; Wally 47'

Stade du 4 Août, Ouagadougou
Referee: Teneba Bagayoko (Mali)
1 February 2020
16:30 UTC+0

Gambia	0–0	Burkina Faso
	Report (Soccerway)

Independence Stadium, Bakau

Burkina Faso won 3–2 on aggregate.

18 January 2020
17:00 UTC+0

Mauritania	0–6	Guinea-Bissau
	Report (Soccerway)	Fatumata (?); Nani (?); Nanó (?)

Stade Cheikha Ould Boïdiya, Nouakchott
1 February 2020
17:00 UTC+0

Guinea-Bissau	9–0	Mauritania
Nadi 2', 89'; ? 6' (o.g.); Fatumata 17', 52', 67', 90+2'; Suraia 50'; Adama 78'	Report (Soccerway)

Estádio 24 de Setembro, Bissau

Guinea-Bissau won 15–0 on aggregate.

18 January 2020
16:30 UTC+0

Sierra Leone	0–1	Senegal
	Report (Soccerway)	Touré 55'

Bo Stadium, Bo
1 February 2020
17:00 UTC+0

Senegal	0–0	Sierra Leone
	Report (Soccerway)

Stade Al Djigo, Pikine

Senegal won 1–0 on aggregate.

19 January 2020
16:00 UTC+3

Tanzania	2–1	Uganda
Msewa 65'; Clement 70'	Report (Soccerway)	Nalukenge 47'

National Stadium, Dar es Salaam
1 February 2020
16:00 UTC+3

Uganda	1–2	Tanzania
Nabbumba 48'	Report (Soccerway)	Msewa 59'; Clement 68'

Startimes Stadium, Kampala
Referee: Darlene Nduwayo (Burundi)

Tanzania won 4–2 on aggregate.

18 January 2020
15:00 UTC+2

Burundi	0–5	Ethiopia
	Report (Soccerway)	Feleke 9'; Debisa 17'; Kalsa 47'; Angelique 72' (o.g.); Asereshagn 84'

Prince Louis Rwagasore Stadium, Bujumbura
Referee: Shamirah Nabadda (Uganda)
2 February 2020
16:00 UTC+3

Ethiopia	2–1	Burundi
Yirdaw 27'; Kalsa 30'	Report (Soccerway)	Nihorimbere 52'

Bahir Dar Stadium, Bahir Dar

Ethiopia won 7–1 on aggregate.

18 January 2020
14:30 UTC+2

Malawi	1–1	Zimbabwe
Mhango 87'	Report (Soccerway)	Dambamuromo 60'

Kamuzu Stadium, Blantyre
Referee: Letticia Viana (Eswatini)
1 February 2020
15:00 UTC+2

Zimbabwe	1–0	Malawi
Bizeki 72'	Report (Soccerway)

Barbourfields Stadium, Bulawayo

Zimbabwe won 2–1 on aggregate.

19 January 2020
17:00 UTC+2

Namibia	0–7	Botswana
	Report (Soccerway)	Abueng 2', 23', 27', 65', 67'; Rathari 44'; Pilane 75'

Sam Nujoma Stadium, Windhoek
31 January 2020
18:00 UTC+2

Botswana	2–0	Namibia
Rathari 13'; Dithebe 22'	Report (Soccerway)

Botswana National Stadium, Gaborone

Botswana won 9–0 on aggregate.

18 January 2020
15:00 UTC+2

Zambia	0–2	South Africa
	Report (Soccerway)	Daniels 8'; Shamase 38'

Nkoloma Stadium, Lusaka
1 February 2020
15:00 UTC+2

South Africa	2–2	Zambia
Daniels 18'; Vilakazi 80'	Report (Soccerway)	Mapepa 3'; Lubanji 77'

Orlando Stadium, Johannesburg
Referee: Itumeleng Methikga (Botswana)

South Africa won 4–2 on aggregate.

== First round ==
Team 1	Agg.	Team 2	1st leg	2nd leg
Morocco	Match 14	Algeria	—	—
Gabon	Match 15	Congo	—	—
Liberia	Match 16	Cameroon	—	—
Burkina Faso	Match 17	Nigeria	—	—
Guinea-Bissau	Match 18	Ghana	—	—
Senegal	Match 19	Tanzania	—	—
Ethiopia	Match 20	Zimbabwe	—	—
Botswana	Match 21	South Africa	—	—

== Second round ==
Team 1	Agg.	Team 2	1st leg	2nd leg
Winner 14	Match 22	Winner 15	—	—
Winner 16	Match 23	Winner 17	—	—
Winner 18	Match 24	Winner 19	—	—
Winner 20	Match 25	Winner 21	—	—

== Third round ==
Winners would have qualified for the 2021 FIFA U-20 Women's World Cup.

Team 1	Agg.	Team 2	1st leg	2nd leg
Winner 22	Match 26	Winner 23	—	—
Winner 24	Match 27	Winner 25	—	—

== Goalscorers ==
There were 94 goals scored in 24 matches, for an average of 3.92 goals per match (as of 2 February 2020).

7 goals

- (Guinea-Bissau) Fatumata

5 goals

- (Botswana) Michelle Abueng

4 goals

- (Liberia) Agatha Nimene

3 goals

- (Algeria) Khadidja Nefidsa
- (Morocco) Doha Ahmamou

2 goals

- (Botswana) Oratile Rathari
- (Republic of the Congo) Aminata Dembélé
- (Republic of the Congo) Dorise Senga
- (Egypt) Nadine Ghazi
- (Ethiopia) Aregash Kalsa
- (Guinea) Aminata Camara
- (Guinea-Bissau) Nadi
- (Guinea-Bissau) Nani
- (Liberia) Lucy Kikeh
- (Tanzania) Diana Msewa
- (Tanzania) Opah Clement
- (South Africa) Chelsea Daniels

1 goal

- (Algeria) Ghania Ayadi
- (Algeria) Ikram Bahri
- (Algeria) Nassima Bakhti
- (Algeria) Aïcha Hamidèche
- (Algeria) Ghada Kennouche
- (Algeria) Khouloud Ournani
- (Angola) Alima
- (Angola) Madó
- (Botswana) Keitumetse Dithebe
- (Botswana) Tebatso Pilane
- (Burkina Faso) Adama Congo
- (Burkina Faso) Elodie Goungounga
- (Burkina Faso) Adèle Kaboré
- (Burundi) Divine Nihorimbere
- (Republic of the Congo) Queen Dzoussi
- (Republic of the Congo) Magalie Massoumou
- (Egypt) Nada Emad
- (Egypt) Dana Nadda
- (Ethiopia) Rediet Asereshagn
- (Ethiopia) Tarikwua Debisa
- (Ethiopia) Mirekat Feleke
- (Ethiopia) Sira Yirdaw
- (The Gambia) Catherine Jatta
- (The Gambia) Haddy Wally
- (Guinea) Nathaly Cissé
- (Guinea) Kany Sidibé
- (Guinea-Bissau) Adama
- (Guinea-Bissau) Nanó
- (Guinea-Bissau) Surai
- (Liberia) Pauline Agbotsu
- (Malawi) Yamikani Mhango
- (Morocco) Safae Banouk
- (Morocco) Jihane Barchi
- (Morocco) Fatema Brima
- (Morocco) Zineb Redouani
- (Morocco) Oumaïma Tayar
- (Senegal) Fatou Touré
- (South Africa) Thubelihle Shamase
- (South Africa) Zethembiso Vilakazi
- (Uganda) Phiona Nabbumba
- (Uganda) Juliet Nalukenge
- (Zambia) Oseke Lubanji
- (Zambia) Siomala Mapepa
- (Zimbabwe) Talent Bizeki
- (Zimbabwe) Shyline Dambamuromo

1 own goal

- (Burundi) Keza Angelique (against Ethiopia)
- (Liberia) Jackie Touah (against Guinea)
- (Mauritania) ? (against Guinea-Bissau)
