= 2015 African U-20 Women's World Cup qualification =

2015 African U-20 Women's World Cup Qualifying Tournament
Tournament details
- Dates: 2 May – 8 November 2015
- Teams: 19 (from 1 confederation)

Tournament statistics
- Matches played: 32
- Goals scored: 94 (2.94 per match)
- Top scorer(s): (Ethiopia) Loza Abera (Nigeria) Chinwendu Ihezuo (6 goals each)

The 2015 African U-20 Women's World Cup Qualifying Tournament was the 8th edition of the African U-20 Women's World Cup Qualifying Tournament, the biennial international youth football competition organised by the Confederation of African Football (CAF) to determine which women's under-20 national teams from Africa qualify for the FIFA U-20 Women's World Cup. Players born on or after 1 January 1996 were eligible to compete in the tournament.

The top two teams of the tournament qualified for the 2016 FIFA U-20 Women's World Cup in Papua New Guinea as the CAF representatives.

Ghana and Nigeria qualified for the World Cup like in the last three editions.

== Teams ==
A total of 19 CAF member national teams entered the qualifying rounds.

Round	Teams entering round	No. of teams
Preliminary round	Burkina Faso; Djibouti; DR Congo; Gabon; Liberia; Sierra Leone	6
First round	Algeria; Botswana; Cameroon; Equatorial Guinea; Ethiopia; Ghana; Mali; Namibia; Nigeria; Senegal; South Africa; Tanzania; Zambia	13
Qualifying rounds	Total	19

Did not enter
- Angola
- Benin
- Burundi
- Cape Verde
- Central African Republic
- Chad
- Comoros
- Congo
- Egypt
- Eritrea
- Gambia
- Guinea
- Guinea-Bissau
- Ivory Coast
- Kenya
- Lesotho
- Libya
- Madagascar
- Malawi
- Mauritania
- Mauritius
- Morocco
- Mozambique
- Niger
- Rwanda
- São Tomé and Príncipe
- Somalia
- Seychelles
- South Sudan
- Sudan
- Swaziland
- Togo
- Tunisia
- Uganda
- Zimbabwe

== Format ==
Qualification ties were played on a home-and-away two-legged basis. If the aggregate score was tied after the second leg, the away goals rule would be applied, and if still level, the penalty shoot-out would be used to determine the winner (no extra time would be played).

The two winners of the third round qualified for the FIFA U-20 Women's World Cup.

== Schedule ==
The schedule of the qualifying rounds was as follows.

Round	Leg	Date
Preliminary round	First leg	1–3 May 2015
Preliminary round	Second leg	15–17 May 2015
First round	First leg	10–12 July 2015
First round	Second leg	24–26 July 2015
Second round	First leg	25–27 September 2015
Second round	Second leg	9–11 October 2015
Third round	First leg	23–25 October 2015
Third round	Second leg	6–8 November 2015

== Preliminary round ==
Team 1	Agg.	Team 2	1st leg	2nd leg
Djibouti	0–7	Burkina Faso	0–2	0–5
DR Congo	6–0	Gabon	5–0	1–0
Sierra Leone	w/o	Liberia	—	—

Note: Sierra Leone withdrew. First leg of DR Congo v Gabon was postponed to 9 May due to field problems, then to 16 May due to Gabon missing the flight.

2 May 2015
16:00 UTC+3

Djibouti	0–2	Burkina Faso
	Report	Sawadogo ?', ?'

Stade du Ville, Djibouti
Referee: Inès Niyonsaba (Burundi)
15 May 2015
15:30 UTC±0

Burkina Faso	5–0	Djibouti
Traoré 5', 46'; Sawadogo 11'; Compaoré 46' (pen.); Sow 81'	Report

Stade Municipal, Ouagadougou
Referee: Isatou Touray (Gambia)

Burkina Faso won 7–0 on aggregate.

16 May 2015
15:30 UTC+1

DR Congo	5–0	Gabon
Mwadi 13', 32'; Mbemba 53'; Salu 68'; Boyengwa 90+'	Report

Stade Tata Raphaël, Kinshasa
Referee: Jonesia Rukyaa Kabakama (Tanzania)
24 May 2015
15:30 UTC+1

Gabon	0–1	DR Congo
	Report	Salu 44'

Stade Omar Bongo, Libreville

DR Congo won 6–0 on aggregate.

1 May 2015

Sierra Leone	Cancelled	Liberia
	Report

15 May 2015

Liberia	Cancelled	Sierra Leone
	Report

Liberia won on walkover.

== First round ==
Team 1	Agg.	Team 2	1st leg	2nd leg
Algeria	2–3	Burkina Faso	1–2	1–1
Cameroon	1–2	Ethiopia	0–0	1–2
Equatorial Guinea	4–0	Mali	4–0	0–0
Ghana	8–0	Senegal	6–0	2–0
DR Congo	5–0	Namibia	4–0	1–0
Liberia	1–14	Nigeria	1–7	0–7
Tanzania	0–4	Zambia	0–4	0–0
South Africa	9–1	Botswana	8–1	1–0

Note: Order of legs between Liberia and Nigeria reversed from original fixtures.

12 July 2015
22:15 UTC+1

Algeria	1–2	Burkina Faso
Meskari 47' (pen.)	Report	Coulibaly 25'; Ouattara 85'

Stade Omar Hamadi, Algiers
25 July 2015
15:30 UTC±0

Burkina Faso	1–1	Algeria
Drabo 36'	Report	Lamari 75'

Stade Municipal, Ouagadougou

Burkina Faso won 3–2 on aggregate.

12 July 2015
15:00 UTC+1

Cameroon	0–0	Ethiopia
	Report

Stade Ahmadou Ahidjo, Yaoundé
26 July 2015
16:00 UTC+3

Ethiopia	2–1	Cameroon
Abera 18', 54'	Report	Mbengono 40'

Bahir Dar Stadium, Bahir Dar

Ethiopia won 2–1 on aggregate.

12 July 2015
16:00 UTC+1

Equatorial Guinea	4–0	Mali
Esono 37'; Aju ?'; Nsang ?'; Mendoua ?'	Report

Estadio de Malabo, Malabo
24 July 2015
16:30 UTC±0

Mali	0–0	Equatorial Guinea
	Report

Stade du 26 Mars, Bamako

Equatorial Guinea won 4–0 on aggregate.

12 July 2015
15:00 UTC±0

Ghana	6–0	Senegal
Owusu-Ansah 2', 90'; Alhassan 17' (pen.); Adubea 32'; Ayieyam 41', 78'	Report

Accra Sports Stadium, Accra
24 July 2015
17:00 UTC±0

Senegal	0–2	Ghana
	Report	Ayieyam ?'; Niber-Lawrence ?'

Stade Demba Diop, Dakar

Ghana won 8–0 on aggregate.

12 July 2015
15:30 UTC+1

DR Congo	4–0	Namibia
Salu 4'; Mwadi 13', 51'; Kipoyi 44'	Report

Stade Tata Raphaël, Kinshasa
Referee: Tsige Sisay (Ethiopia)
26 July 2015
14:30 UTC+1

Namibia	0–1	DR Congo
	Report	Mwadi 64'

Sam Nujoma Stadium, Windhoek
Referee: Akhona Makalima (South Africa)

DR Congo won 5–0 on aggregate.

12 July 2015
16:00 UTC±0

Liberia	1–7	Nigeria
Sayee 40'	Report	Adeboyejo 15', 36', 60'; Ihezuo 30'; Sunday 70'; Ojinma 78', 87'

Antoinette Tubman Stadium, Monrovia
25 July 2015
16:00 UTC+1

Nigeria	7–0	Liberia
Uchendu 23'; Ojinma 26'; Yakubu 35', 77'; Adeboyejo 39'; Bokiri 71', 82'	Report

National Stadium, Abuja
Referee: Vincentia Enyonam Amedome (Togo)

Nigeria won 14–1 on aggregate.

11 July 2015
16:00 UTC+3

Tanzania	0–4	Zambia
	Report	Phiri 4'; Lungu 20'; Banda 33'; Wilombe 50' (pen.)

Chamazi Stadium, Dar es Salaam
Referee: Batol Mahjob Ibrahim (Sudan)
25 July 2015
15:00 UTC+2

Zambia	0–0	Tanzania
	Report

Nkoloma Stadium, Lusaka

Zambia won 4–0 on aggregate.

12 July 2015
15:00 UTC+2

South Africa	8–1	Botswana
Wiltshire 8'; Salgado 27', 78' (pen.); Ndyebi 35', 50'; Kgatlana 40', 58'; Motlhalo 52'	Report	Mathlo 56'

Dobsonville Stadium, Johannesburg
24 July 2015
15:00 UTC+2

Botswana	0–1	South Africa
	Report	Sikweza 48'

Molepololo Sport Complex, Gaborone
Referee: Nirinjanahary Raharijaona (Madagascar)

South Africa won 9–1 on aggregate.

== Second round ==
Team 1	Agg.	Team 2	1st leg	2nd leg
Burkina Faso	0–2	Ethiopia	0–2	0–0
Equatorial Guinea	0–3	Ghana	0–1	0–2
DR Congo	1–4	Nigeria	1–2	0–2
Zambia	2–3	South Africa	0–0	2–3

Note: First leg of Burkina Faso v Ethiopia was postponed to 3 October, then to 10 October, due to coup in Burkina Faso.

10 October 2015
15:30 UTC±0

Burkina Faso	0–2	Ethiopia
	Report	Abera 8', 69'

Stade Municipal, Ouagadougou
Referee: Uloma Nneka Nwogu (Nigeria)
18 October 2015
16:00 UTC+3

Ethiopia	0–0	Burkina Faso
	Report

Addis Ababa Stadium, Addis Ababa
Referee: Tabitha Wambui Njoroge (Kenya)

Ethiopia won 2–0 on aggregate.

27 September 2015
16:00 UTC+1

Equatorial Guinea	0–1	Ghana
	Report	Diwura-Soale 31'

Estadio de Malabo, Malabo
Referee: Suavis Iratunga (Burundi)
11 October 2015
15:00 UTC±0

Ghana	2–0	Equatorial Guinea
Niber-Lawrence 73'; Appiah 90'	Report

Baba Yara Stadium, Kumasi
Referee: Viviane Kouélé Igue (Benin)

Ghana won 3–0 on aggregate.

27 September 2015
15:30 UTC+1

DR Congo	1–2	Nigeria
Salu 38'	Report	Uchendu 6'; Ihezuo 12'

Stade Tata Raphaël, Kinshasa
Referee: Thérèse Sylvie Abou'ou (Cameroon)
10 October 2015
16:00 UTC+1

Nigeria	2–0	DR Congo
Ihezuo 8', 56'	Report

National Stadium, Abuja
Referee: Zomadre Sonia Kore (Ivory Coast)

Nigeria won 4–1 on aggregate.

27 September 2015
15:00 UTC+2

Zambia	0–0	South Africa
	Report

Nkoloma Stadium, Lusaka
Referee: Letticia Antonella Viana (Swaziland)
10 October 2015
15:00 UTC+2

South Africa	3–2	Zambia
Motlhalo 1', 74'; Makhoali 55'	Report	Banda 52'; Musesa 57'

Makhulong Stadium, Tembisa
Referee: Rusina Kuda Majo (Zimbabwe)

South Africa won 3–2 on aggregate.

== Third round ==
Winners qualified for 2016 FIFA U-20 Women's World Cup.

Team 1	Agg.	Team 2	1st leg	2nd leg
Ethiopia	2–6	Ghana	2–2	0–4
Nigeria	3–1	South Africa	2–1	1–0

24 October 2015
16:00 UTC+3

Ethiopia	2–2	Ghana
Abera 15', 22'	Report	Muso 4' (o.g.); Addo 80'

Addis Ababa Stadium, Addis Ababa
8 November 2015
15:00 UTC±0

Ghana	4–0	Ethiopia
Adubea 33', 51'; Owusu-Ansah 49', 67'	Report

Baba Yara Stadium, Kumasi

Ghana won 6–2 on aggregate.

24 October 2015
15:00 UTC+1

Nigeria	2–1	South Africa
Ihezuo 30'; Van Reyneveld 45' (o.g.)	Report	Salgado 90' (pen.)

National Stadium, Abuja
8 November 2015
15:00 UTC+2

South Africa	0–1	Nigeria
	Report	Ihezuo 16'

Makhulong Stadium, Johannesburg

Nigeria won 3–1 on aggregate.

== Qualified teams for FIFA U-20 Women's World Cup ==
The following two teams from CAF qualified for the FIFA U-20 Women's World Cup.

Team	Qualified on	Previous appearances in tournament^{1}
Ghana	8 November 2015	3 (2010, 2012, 2014)
Nigeria	8 November 2015	7 (2002, 2004, 2006, 2008, 2010, 2012, 2014)

^{1} Bold indicates champion for that year. Italic indicates host for that year.

== Goalscorers ==
6 goals

- (Ethiopia) Loza Abera
- (Nigeria) Chinwendu Ihezuo

5 goals

- (Democratic Republic of the Congo) Joëlle Mwadi

4 goals

- (Democratic Republic of the Congo) Hornella Lengi Salu
- (Ghana) Sandra Owusu-Ansah
- (Nigeria) Yetunde Adeboyejo

3 goals

- (Burkina Faso) Barkissa Sawadogo
- (Ghana) Princella Adubea
- (Ghana) Jane Ayieyam
- (Nigeria) Amarachi Ojinma
- (South Africa) Gabriela Salgado
- (South Africa) Linda Motlhalo

2 goals

- (Burkina Faso) Mariam Fifao Traoré
- (Ghana) Lily Niber-Lawrence
- (Nigeria) Joy Bokiri
- (Nigeria) Chinaza Uchendu
- (Nigeria) Amina Yakubu
- (South Africa) Chrestinah Kgatlana
- (South Africa) Anelisa Ndyebi
- (Zambia) Barbara Banda

1 goal

- (Algeria) Naima Lamari
- (Algeria) Baya Meskari
- (Botswana) Refilwe Mathlo
- (Burkina Faso) Mouniratou Compaoré
- (Burkina Faso) Assifou Coulibaly
- (Burkina Faso) Chantal Drabo
- (Burkina Faso) Yasmine Ouattara
- (Burkina Faso) Stéphanie Sow
- (Cameroon) Catherine Mbengono
- (Democratic Republic of the Congo) Natacha Boyengwa
- (Democratic Republic of the Congo) Ruth Kipoyi
- (Democratic Republic of the Congo) Flavine Mawete
- (Democratic Republic of the Congo) Merveille Mbemba
- (Equatorial Guinea) Olga Esono
- (Equatorial Guinea) Aju Francisca
- (Equatorial Guinea) Muriel Lynda Mendoua
- (Equatorial Guinea) Isabel Nsang
- (Ghana) Kate Addo
- (Ghana) Fatima Alhassan
- (Ghana) Veronica Appiah
- (Ghana) Wasila Diwura-Soale
- (Liberia) Kanties Sayee
- (Nigeria) Chinozo Sunday
- (South Africa) Mosili Makhoali
- (South Africa) Nomathansanqa Sikweza
- (South Africa) Chamelle Wiltshire
- (Zambia) Ireen Lungu
- (Zambia) Agness Musesa
- (Zambia) Memory Phiri
- (Zambia) Mary Wilombe

Own goal

- (Ethiopia) Hassabi Muso (playing against Ghana)
- (South Africa) Caryn van Reyneveld (playing against Nigeria)
