= 2025 COSAFA U-20 Women's Championship =

COSAFA U-20 Women's Championship 2025

Tournament details
- Host country: Namibia
- Dates: 4 – 13 July
- Teams: 8 (from 1 sub-confederation)
- Venue: 1 (in 1 host city)

Final positions
- Champions: Zambia (2nd title)
- Runners-up: South Africa
- Third place: Botswana
- Fourth place: Namibia

Tournament statistics
- Matches played: 16
- Goals scored: 61 (3.81 per match)
- Top scorer(s): (Zambia) Bwalya Chileshe (Zambia) Ruth Mukoma (6 goals each)
- Best player: (Zambia) Saliya Mwanza
- Best goalkeeper: (Zambia) Margaret Phiri
- Fair play award: Namibia

The 2025 COSAFA U-20 Women's Championship was the third edition of the COSAFA U-20 Women's Championship, the international women's youth football championship contested by the under-20 women's national teams of the member associations of COSAFA. The tournament doubled as the women's football competition for the AUSC Region 5 Youth Games Namibia 2025 and was hosted in Windhoek from 4 to 13 July 2025. This is Namibia's sixth time hosting a COSAFA tournament, and the fifth time it's in a different competition category.

Zambia were the title-holders, having won their first title in last year's edition. and they successfully defended their crown, completing the tournament unbeaten and without conceding a single goal.

== Participation ==
=== Participating teams ===
Eight of the 14 COSAFA Member Associations entered teams for the competition, with Angola and Malawi making their tournament debuts.

Team	App	Last	Previous best performance	Ref.
Angola	1st	Debut		
Botswana	3rd	2024	Group stage (2019)	
Eswatini	2nd	2019	Group stage (2019)	
Malawi	1st	Debut		
Namibia	2nd	2019	Group stage (2019)	
South Africa	3rd	2024	Runners-up (2024)	
Zambia	3rd	2024	Champions (2024)	
Zimbabwe	2nd	2019	Fourth place (2019)	

Did not enter

- Comoros
- Lesotho
- Madagascar
- Mauritius
- Mozambique
- Seychelles

=== Draw ===
The tournament draw took place on 27 April 2025.

The draw resulted in the following groups:

Group A
Pos	Team
A1	Namibia
A2	Mozambique (Note: Mozambique, who were initially set to participate and were included in the original draw, later withdrew from the tournament. They were subsequently replaced by Malawi, who took their spot in the group.)
A3	Botswana
A4	Zimbabwe

Group B
Pos	Team
B1	Zambia
B2	South Africa
B3	Eswatini
B4	Angola

== Venues ==
The women's competition will mainly be held at the University of Namibia Sports Stadium, although the final and a few group stage matches will take place in the stadium designated for men's competition.

Windhoek		2025 COSAFA U-20 Women's Championship is located in Namibia
UNAM Sports Stadium	Hage Geingob Stadium	2025 COSAFA U-20 Women's Championship is located in Namibia
Capacity: 5,000	Capacity: 10,000	2025 COSAFA U-20 Women's Championship is located in Namibia

== Group stage ==
All times are local, CAT (UTC+2). The match schedule was confirmed by COSAFA on 13 June 2025.

=== Group A ===
Pos	Team	Pld	W	D	L	GF	GA	GD	Pts	Qualification
1	Namibia (H)	3	2	1	0	3	1	+2	7	Advance to knockout stage
2	Botswana	3	2	0	1	4	3	+1	6	Advance to knockout stage
3	Zimbabwe	3	1	0	2	7	6	+1	3	
4	Malawi	3	0	1	2	3	7	−4	1	

Source: COSAFA
Rules for classification: Tiebreakers
(H) Hosts
4 July 2025
12:00

Botswana	2–1	Zimbabwe
Lesotlo 38'; Sebotho 90+2'	Report	Bandason 5'

UNAM Sports Stadium, Windhoek
Referee: Elizabeth Haufiku (Namibia)
4 July 2025
15:00

Namibia	0–0	Malawi
	Report

UNAM Sports Stadium, Windhoek
Referee: Jabulile Mgabhi (Eswatini)

6 July 2025
13:00

Malawi	0–1	Botswana
	Report	Lesotlo 61'

UNAM Sports Stadium, Windhoek
Referee: Linnet Moyo (Zimbabwe)
6 July 2025
16:00

Namibia	1–0	Zimbabwe
Tokwane 68'	Report

UNAM Sports Stadium, Windhoek
Referee: Jabulile Mgabhi (Eswatini)

8 July 2025
13:00

Namibia	2–1	Botswana
Tokwane 37'; Hangula 67'	Report	Lesotlo 87'

Hage Geingob Stadium, Windhoek
Referee: Linnet Moyo (Zimbabwe)
8 July 2025
13:00

Malawi	3–6	Zimbabwe
Umali 38'; Mkwala 61', 69'	Report	Mpofu 10'; Chinyoka 28' (pen.), 41'; Mashanda 76'; Bandason 85'; Genti 90+1'

UNAM Sports Stadium, Windhoek
Referee: Hertha Angala (Namibia)

=== Group B ===
Pos	Team	Pld	W	D	L	GF	GA	GD	Pts	Qualification
1	Zambia	3	3	0	0	19	0	+19	9	Advance to knockout stage
2	South Africa	3	2	0	1	8	5	+3	6	Advance to knockout stage
3	Angola	3	1	0	2	6	15	−9	3	
4	Eswatini	3	0	0	3	2	15	−13	0	

Source: COSAFA
Rules for classification: Tiebreakers
5 July 2025
13:00

Eswatini	2–4	Angola
Se. Dlamini 41'; Gama 66' (pen.)	Report	Correia 51' (pen.); Viera 53', 64'; Araújo 83'

UNAM Sports Stadium, Windhoek
Referee: Hertha Angala (Namibia)
5 July 2025
16:00

Zambia	3–0	South Africa
Chileshe 23'; Hanongo 33'; Mwewa 90+3'	Report

UNAM Sports Stadium, Windhoek
Referee: Rose Zimba (Malawi)

7 July 2025
13:00

South Africa	3–0	Eswatini
Mokoena 6'; Mabuza 16'; Mhlahlo 45'	Report

UNAM Sports Stadium, Windhoek
Referee: Rose Zimba (Malawi)
7 July 2025
16:00

Zambia	8–0	Angola
Zulu 8'; Mwanza 16', 23'; Chileshe 33', 46'; Mbali 35', 67'; Bwalya 38' (pen.)	Report

UNAM Sports Stadium, Windhoek
Referee: Elizabeth Haufiku (Namibia)

9 July 2025
13:00

Zambia	8–0	Eswatini
Hanongo 9'; Mukoma 13', 18', 27', 33', 42'; Chileshe 24'; G. Phiri 70'	Report

Hage Geingob Stadium, Windhoek
Referee: Elizabeth Haufiku (Namibia)
9 July 2025
13:00

South Africa	5–2	Angola
Mabuza 5', 59'; Malebana 45+2', 87'; Khoza 73'	Report	Viera 24'; Araújo 52'

UNAM Sports Stadium, Windhoek
Referee: Rose Zimba (Malawi)

== Knockout stage ==
=== Bracket ===
Semi-finals
11 July
Zambia	5
Botswana	0
11 July
Namibia	0
South Africa	1

Final
13 July
Zambia	2
South Africa	0
Third place
12 July
Botswana	1
Namibia	0

=== Semi-finals ===
11 July 2025
13:00

Zambia	5–0	Botswana
Chileshe 4', 36' (pen.); Mukoma 43'; Mwanza 48'; Muwowo 90+1'	Report

Hage Geingob Stadium, Windhoek
Referee: Jabulile Mgabhi (Eswatini)

11 July 2025
16:00

Namibia	0–1	South Africa
	Report	Mabuza 6'

Hage Geingob Stadium, Windhoek
Referee: Linnet Moyo (Zimbabwe)

=== Third place ===
12 July 2025
12:00

Botswana	1–0	Namibia
Tokonyane 88'	Report

UNAM Sport Stadium, Windhoek
Referee: Linnet Moyo (Zimbabwe)

=== Final ===
13 July 2025
11:00

Zambia	2–0	South Africa
Muwowo 73'; Malanda 90+3'	Report

UNAM Sport Stadium, Windhoek
Referee: Rose Zimba (Malawi)

== Goalscorers ==
There were 61 goals scored in 16 matches, for an average of 3.81 goals per match.

6 goals

- (Zambia) Bwalya Chileshe
- (Zambia) Ruth Mukoma

4 goals

- (South Africa) Lindelwa Mabuza

3 goals

- (Angola) Maria Viera
- (Botswana) Hope Lesotlo
- (Zambia) Saliya Mwanza

2 goals

- (Angola) Glória Araújo
- (Malawi) Victoria Mkwala
- (Namibia) Ontheedite Tokwane
- (South Africa) Katleho Malebana
- (Zambia) Lweendo Hanongo
- (Zambia) Victoria Mbali
- (Zambia) Ruth Muwowo
- (Zimbabwe) Plaxina Bandason
- (Zimbabwe) Alicia Chinyoka

1 goal

- (Angola) Sandra Correia
- (Botswana) Amogelang Sebotho
- (Botswana) Shirley Tokonyane
- (Eswatini) Sethabile Dlamini
- (Eswatini) Nozenzo Gama
- (Malawi) Faluna Umali
- (Namibia) Renalda Hangula
- (South Africa) Khwezi Khoza
- (South Africa) Zizipho Mhlahlo
- (South Africa) Busisiwe Mokoena
- (Zambia) Eunice Bwalya
- (Zambia) Nana Malanda
- (Zambia) Lombanya Mwewa
- (Zambia) Grace Phiri
- (Zambia) Zangose Zulu
- (Zimbabwe) Merian Genti
- (Zimbabwe) Priviledge Mashanda
- (Zimbabwe) Ntokozo Mpofu

== See also ==
- 2025 COSAFA U-17 Girls' Championship
- 2025 COSAFA U-20 Championship
