= 2024 African U-20 Women's World Cup qualification =

2024 African U-20 Women's World Cup Qualifying Tournament
Tournament details
- Dates: 1 September 2023 – 21 January 2024
- Teams: 35 (from 1 confederation)

Tournament statistics
- Matches played: 54
- Goals scored: 183 (3.39 per match)
- Top scorer(s): (Cameroon) Naomi Ndjoah Eto (6 goals)

The 2024 African U-20 Women's World Cup qualification was the 12th edition of the African U-20 Women's World Cup qualification, the biennial international youth football competition organised by the Confederation of African Football (CAF) to determine which women's under-20 national teams from Africa qualify for the FIFA U-20 Women's World Cup. Players born on or after 1 January 2004 were eligible to compete in the tournament.

Four teams qualified from this tournament for the 2024 FIFA U-20 Women's World Cup in Colombia as the CAF representatives.

== Draw ==
A total of 35 (out of 54) CAF member national teams entered the qualifying rounds. The draw was held on 8 June 2023 at the CAF headquarters in Cairo, Egypt.

- In the first round, the 6 teams were drawn into 3 ties to play against each other.
- In the second round, the 3 first round winners and the 29 teams receiving byes to the second round were allocated into 16 ties based on the first round tie numbers, with 3 first round winners playing against the 3 teams receiving byes, and the other 26 first round winners playing against each other.
- In the third round, the 16 second round winners were allocated into eight ties based on the second round tie numbers.
- In the fourth round, the eight third round winners were allocated into four ties based on the third round tie numbers.

=== Table ===
Participants (35 teams)
Pot A (5 from CECAFA)	Pot B (9 from COSAFA)	Pot C (4 from UNAF)	Pot D (7 from UNIFFAC)	Pot E (4 from WAFU A)	Pot F (6 from WAFU B)
Ethiopia; Uganda; Kenya; Djibouti; Burundi	Tanzania; Namibia; Eswatini; Angola; Botswana; Mozambique; South Africa; Mauritius; Zambia	Algeria; Egypt; **Morocco**; Libya	Equatorial Guinea; DR Congo; São Tomé and Príncipe; Congo; Gabon; **Cameroon**; Chad	Senegal; Mali; Guinea; Guinea-Bissau	Burkina Faso; **Nigeria**; **Ghana**; Benin; Niger; Togo

Notes

- Teams in **bold** qualified for the final tournament.

=== Did not enter ===
- Cape Verde
- Central African Republic
- Comoros
- Eritrea
- Gambia
- Ivory Coast
- Lesotho
- Liberia
- Madagascar
- Malawi
- Mauritania
- Rwanda
- Seychelles
- Sierra Leone
- Somalia
- South Sudan
- Sudan
- Tunisia
- Zimbabwe

== Format ==
Qualification ties were played on a home-and-away two-legged basis. If the aggregate score was tied after the second leg, the away goals rule would be applied, and if still tied, the penalty shoot-out (no extra time) would be used to determine the winner.

== Schedule ==
Round	Leg	Date
First round	First leg	1–3 September 2023
First round	Second leg	8–10 September 2023
Second round	First leg	6–8 October 2023
Second round	Second leg	13–15 October 2023
Third round	First leg	10–12 November 2023
Third round	Second leg	17–19 November 2023
Fourth round	First leg	12–14 January 2024
Fourth round	Second leg	20–21 January 2024

== Bracket ==
The four winners of the fourth round would qualify for the 2024 FIFA U-20 Women's World Cup.

Second round
Morocco	4	1	5
Burkina Faso	0	1	1
Niger	0	0	0
Guinea	4	6	10
Mali (a)	1	1	2
Algeria	0	2	2
Equatorial Guinea	1	1	2
Ethiopia	1	4	5

Third round
Morocco	3	2	5
Guinea	0	0	0
Mali	0	0	0
Ethiopia	2	4	6

Fourth round
Morocco	2	0	2
Ethiopia	0	1	1

Second round
Senegal	2	0	2
Benin	0	0	0
Mozambique	0	0	0
Uganda	6	2	8
Eswatini	—	—	w/o
Gabon	—	—
Guinea-Bissau	0	0	0
Ghana	3	3	6

Third round
Senegal	1	1	2
Uganda	0	1	1
Eswatini	1	0	1
Ghana	6	2	8

Fourth round
Senegal	0	1	1
Ghana	2	5	7

Second round
Congo	2	3	5
Namibia	1	0	1
Egypt	7	11	18
São Tomé and Príncipe	0	0	0
Cameroon	2	4	6
Botswana	0	1	1
Kenya	6	4	10
Angola	1	0	1

Third round
Congo	1	0	1
Egypt	1	6	7
Cameroon	3	3	6
Kenya	0	2	2

Fourth round
Egypt	2	1	3
Cameroon	4	1	5

Second round
Zambia	2	0	2
DR Congo (a)	2	0	2
Burundi (a)	0	2	2
South Africa	0	2	2
Tanzania	5	7	12
Djibouti	0	0	0
Mauritius	—	—
Nigeria	—	—	w/o

Third round
DR Congo	3	0	3
Burundi (a)	2	1	3
Tanzania	1	1	2
Nigeria	1	2	3

Fourth round
Burundi	0	0	0
Nigeria	1	1	2

== First round ==
Team 1	Agg.	Team 2	1st leg	2nd leg
Equatorial Guinea	w/o	Libya	—	—
Togo	1–6	Guinea-Bissau	1–3	0–3
Mauritius	w/o	Chad	—	—

1–3 September 2023

Equatorial Guinea	Cancelled	Libya

Estadio de Malabo, Malabo
8–10 September 2023

Libya	Cancelled	Equatorial Guinea

Libya

3 September 2023
16:00 UTC+0

Togo	1–3	Guinea-Bissau
Kayaba 40'	Report (FTF)	F. Da Costa 61', 74'; C. Camara 90+6'

Stade de Kégué, Lomé
Referee: (Nigeria)
8 September 2023
16:00 UTC+0

Guinea-Bissau	3–0	Togo
B. Mané 29'; M. Correia 85', 90+4'	Report

Estádio 24 de Setembro, Bissau
Referee: Sylvina Garnett Welma (Liberia)

Guinea-Bissau won 6–1 on aggregate.

1–3 September 2023

Chad	Cancelled	Mauritius

Cote d'Or National Sports Complex, Quatre Bornes (Mauritius)
8–10 September 2023

Mauritius	Cancelled	Chad

Cote d'Or National Sports Complex, Quatre Bornes

== Second round ==
Team 1	Agg.	Team 2	1st leg	2nd leg
Morocco	5–1	Burkina Faso	4–0	1–1
Mali	2–2 (a)	Algeria	1–0	1–2
Senegal	2–0	Benin	2–0	0–0
Eswatini	w/o	Gabon	—	—
Congo	5–1	Namibia	2–1	3–0
Cameroon	6–1	Botswana	2–0	4–1
Zambia	2–2 (a)	DR Congo	2–2	0–0
Tanzania	12–0	Djibouti	5–0	7–0
Niger	0–10	Guinea	0–4	0–6
Equatorial Guinea	2–5	Ethiopia	1–1	1–4
Mozambique	0–8	Uganda	0–6	0–2
Guinea-Bissau	0–6	Ghana	0–3	0–3
Egypt	18–0	São Tomé and Príncipe	7–0	11–0
Kenya	10–1	Angola	6–1	4–0
Burundi	2–2 (a)	South Africa	0–0	2–2
Mauritius	w/o	Nigeria	—	—

8 October 2023
17:00 UTC+1

Morocco	4–0	Burkina Faso
Zouhir 5'; Boussate 49'; El Hamzaoui 61'; Boussatta 78'	Report (FRMF)

Ben M'Hamed El Abdi Stadium, El Jadida
Referee: Asma Chouchane (Tunisia)
13 October 2023
17:00 UTC+1

Burkina Faso	1–1	Morocco
Mounifatou 72'	Report (FRMF)	El Asri 42'

Ben M'Hamed El Abdi Stadium, El Jadida (Morocco)

Morocco won 5–1 on aggregate.

8 October 2023
18:00 UTC+1

Mali	1–0	Algeria
D. Traoré 67'	Report (FAF)

8 May 1945 Stadium, Sétif (Algeria)
Referee: Fatoumata Sall Touré (Senegal)
13 October 2023
18:00 UTC+1

Algeria	2–1	Mali
Cissé 51' (o.g.); El Hadj 86'	Report (FAF)	Berkous 58' (o.g.)

8 May 1945 Stadium, Sétif
Referee: Shahenda Elmaghrabi (Egypt)

2–2 on aggregate. Mali won on away goals.

7 October 2023
17:00 UTC+0

Senegal	2–0	Benin
Badio 5'; Ndiaye 9'	Report (FSF)

Stade Lat-Dior, Thiès
15 October 2023
17:00 UTC+0

Benin	0–0	Senegal
	Report (FSF)

Stade de l'Amitié, Cotonou

Senegal won 2–0 on aggregate.

6–8 October 2023
--:-- UTC+2

Eswatini	Cancelled	Gabon

Somhlolo National Stadium, Lobamba
13–15 October 2023
--:-- UTC+1

Gabon	Cancelled	Eswatini

Stade de Franceville, Franceville

Eswatini won on walkover and advanced to the third round after Gabon withdrew prior to the first leg without citing lack of preparation due to no local championship being contested.

8 October 2023
15:30 UTC+1

Congo	2–1	Namibia
Tokassi 27'; Mbayo 36'	Report (FECOFOOT)	Fillipus 19'

Stade Alphonse Massemba-Débat, Brazzaville
13 October 2023
15:30 UTC+1

Namibia	0–3	Congo
	Report (FECOFOOT)	Akouala 39'; Ntsiba 69'; Amuntale 84' (o.g.)

Stade Alphonse Massemba-Débat, Brazzaville (Congo)

Congo won 5–1 on aggregate.

7 October 2023
17:00 UTC+1

Cameroon	2–0	Botswana
Enganemben 9'; Wehiong 74'	Report

Stade de la Réunification, Douala
14 October 2023
15:00 UTC+1

Botswana	1–4	Cameroon
Dilelo 3'	Report	Enganemben 2', 73'; Eto 39', 89'

Lobatse Stadium, Lobatse

Cameroon won 6–1 on aggregate.

7 October 2023
15:00 UTC+2

Zambia	2–2	DR Congo
Shamalima 4'; Mbewe 58'	Report (FAZ)	Nyamboki 17'; Nosa 67'

Nkoloma Stadium, Lusaka
14 October 2023
15:00 UTC+1

DR Congo	0–0	Zambia
	Report

Stade des Martyrs, Kinshasa

2–2 on aggregate. DR Congo won on away goals.

8 October 2023
15:00 UTC+3

Tanzania	5–0	Djibouti
Rajabu 3', 54'; Luhala 57'; Gerald 68'; Joseph 90'

Azam Complex Stadium, Dar es Salaam
11 October 2023
15:00 UTC+3

Djibouti	0–7	Tanzania
		Rajabu 6', 15'; Gerald 13', 35'; Mnali 31'; Z. Mohamed 32'; Mitoga 89'

Azam Complex Stadium, Dar es Salaam (Tanzania)

Tanzania won 12–0 on aggregate.

12 October 2023
16:00 UTC+0

Niger	0–4	Guinea
	Report	Fancinadouno 11', 38', 62'; Samoura 17'

Stade Général Seyni Kountché, Niamey
15 October 2023
16:30 UTC+1

Guinea	6–0	Niger
Sidibé 20'; Lamah 36', 67'; Fancinadouno 41'; Kourouma 73', 90+1'	Report

Stade Général Seyni Kountché, Niamey (Niger)

Guinea won 10–0 on aggregate.

7 October 2023
15:00 UTC+1

Equatorial Guinea	1–1	Ethiopia
Bopopo 53'		Daniel 9'

Estadio de Malabo, Malabo
15 October 2023
15:30 UTC+3

Ethiopia	4–1	Equatorial Guinea
N. Bekele 31', 41'; Temesgen 60'; Daniel 86'		Etopa 39'

Abebe Bikila Stadium, Addis Ababa

Ethiopia won 5–2 on aggregate.

7 October 2023
15:00 UTC+2

Mozambique	0–6	Uganda
		Nabukenya 18', 33'; Nandago 39', 48'; Kunihira 42'; Naggayi 64'

Estádio da Matola, Maputo
13 October 2023
16:00 UTC+3

Uganda	2–0	Mozambique
Nabulime 6'; Nabukenya 19'

FUFA Technical Centre, Njeru

Uganda won 8–0 on aggregate.

8 October 2023
16:00 UTC+0

Guinea-Bissau	0–3	Ghana
		Ameyaa 45+1'; Amponsah 67'; Attobra 77'

Estádio 24 de Setembro, Bissau
14 October 2023
15:30 UTC+0

Ghana	3–0	Guinea-Bissau
Twum 49'; Mohammed 59'; Alormemu 82'	Report

Accra Sports Stadium, Accra

Ghana won 6–0 on aggregate.

8 October 2023
16:00 UTC+2

Egypt	7–0	São Tomé and Príncipe
N. Al-Sayed 15', 55'; J. Emad 25', 65'; M. Ehab 75', 85'; N. Khaled 90'

Alexandria Stadium, Alexandria
13 October 2023
16:00 UTC+2

São Tomé and Príncipe	0–11	Egypt
		H. Mustafa 13', 44', 75'; C. Shehata 45+2'; N. Khaled 52'; H. Tariq 53', 56'; H. Essam 70'; Y. Khaled 71'; H. Omar 74'; N. Al-Sayed 85'

Alexandria Stadium, Alexandria (Egypt)

Egypt won 18–0 on aggregate.

8 October 2023
15:00 UTC+3

Kenya	6–1	Angola
Nekesa 4', 7', 24'; Midewa 45+2', 58'; Naliaka 81'		Candido 25'

Nyayo National Stadium, Nairobi
14 October 2023
15:30 UTC+1

Angola	0–4	Kenya
	Report (KFF)	Nekesa 6'; Kwoba 38'; Arusi 57'; Midewa 90+4'

Estádio 22 de Junho, Luanda

Kenya won 10–1 on aggregate.

8 October 2023
15:00 UTC+2

Burundi	0–0	South Africa

Lucas Moripe Stadium, Pretoria (South Africa
11 October 2023
15:00 UTC+2

South Africa	2–2	Burundi
Mibe 30'; Mabuza 72'		Akimana 12'; Nshimirimana 68'

Lucas Moripe Stadium, Pretoria

2–2 on aggregate. Burundi won on away goals.

6 October 2023
--:-- UTC+4

Mauritius	Cancelled	Nigeria

Cote d'Or National Sports Complex, Quatre Bornes
14 October 2023
--:-- UTC+1

Nigeria	Cancelled	Mauritius

Moshood Abiola National Stadium, Abuja

Nigeria won on walkover and advanced to the third round after Mauritius withdrew prior to the first leg without providing a reason for their withdrawal.

== Third round ==
Team 1	Agg.	Team 2	1st leg	2nd leg
Morocco	5–0	Guinea	3–0	2–0
Mali	0–6	Ethiopia	0–2	0–4
Senegal	2–1	Uganda	1–0	1–1
Eswatini	1–8	Ghana	1–6	0–2
Congo	1–7	Egypt	1–1	0–6
Cameroon	6–2	Kenya	3–0	3–2
DR Congo	3–3 (a)	Burundi	3–2	0–1
Tanzania	2–3	Nigeria	1–1	1–2

12 November 2023
17:00 UTC+1

Morocco	3–0	Guinea
El Madani 23', 40', 84'

Ben M'Hamed El Abdi Stadium, El Jadida
18 November 2023
16:00 UTC+1

Guinea	0–2	Morocco
		Sadiki 17'; Masnaoui 40'

Ben M'Hamed El Abdi Stadium, El Jadida (Morocco)

Morocco won 5–0 on aggregate.

11 November 2023
16:30 UTC+0

Mali	0–2	Ethiopia
	Report (EFF)	B. Bekele 58'; Daniel 68'

Stade du 26 Mars, Bamako
19 November 2023
15:00 UTC+3

Ethiopia	4–0	Mali
Daniel 34', 45'; Sahilu 66'; Temesgen 70'

Abebe Bikila Stadium, Addis Ababa

Ethiopia won 6–0 on aggregate.

11 November 2023
17:00 UTC+0

Senegal	1–0	Uganda
Ba 44'	Report (FSF)

Stade Lat-Dior, Thiès
18 November 2023
16:00 UTC+3

Uganda	1–1	Senegal
Nandago 4'		Ba 25'

FUFA Technical Centre, Kampala

Senegal won 2–1 on aggregate.

12 November 2023
15:00 UTC+2

Eswatini	1–6	Ghana
Nkambule 5'	[ Report (EFF)]	Attobra 10', 86'; B. Nyarko 28'; Mohammed 49'; S. Nyarko 59'; ? 80' (o.g.)

Somhlolo National Stadium, Lobamba
19 November 2023
15:30 UTC+0

Ghana	2–0	Eswatini
B. Nyarko 6'; S. Nyarko 12'

Accra Sports Stadium, Accra

Ghana won 8–1 on aggregate.

10 November 2023
15:30 UTC+1

Congo	1–1	Egypt
Ndengo 55'	Report (FECOFOOT)	Dana Karim 20' (pen.)

Stade Alphonse Massemba-Débat, Brazzaville
19 November 2023
17:00 UTC+2

Egypt	6–0	Congo
Habiba Essam 5'; Farah Hisham 17'; Dana Karim 31', 67' (pen.); Maya Ehab 75'; Joy Emad 79'

Alexandria Stadium, Alexandria

Egypt won 7–1 on aggregate.

11 November 2023
17:00 UTC+1

Cameroon	3–0	Kenya
Enganemben 21', 36'; Eto 44'

Ahmadou Ahidjo Stadium, Yaoundé
17 November 2023
15:00 UTC+3

Kenya	2–3	Cameroon
Midewa 46', 78'		Eto 24', 60', 63'

Nyayo National Stadium, Nairobi

Cameroon won 6–2 on aggregate.

11 November 2023
15:30 UTC+1

DR Congo	3–2	Burundi
Lubiku 3'; Kalomba 15'; Jenovic 48'	Report (FECOFA)	Bizimana 2', 65' (pen.)

Stade des Martyrs, Kinshasa
17 November 2023
15:00 UTC+3

Burundi	1–0	DR Congo
Nshimirimana 7'

FUFA Technical Centre, Kampala (Uganda)

3–3 on aggregate. Burundi won on away goals.

12 November 2023
15:00 UTC+3

Tanzania	1–1	Nigeria
Ubamba 70'		Olise 57'

Azam Complex Stadium, Dar es Salaam
19 November 2023
16:00 UTC+1

Nigeria	2–1	Tanzania
Aikekoromowei 15'; Folorunsho 60'		Mnundika 20'

Moshood Abiola National Stadium, Abuja

Nigeria won 3–2 on aggregate.

== Fourth round ==
Winners qualify to the 2024 FIFA U-20 Women's World Cup.

Team 1	Agg.	Team 2	1st leg	2nd leg
Morocco	2–1	Ethiopia	2–0	0–1
Senegal	1–7	Ghana	0–2	1–5
Egypt	3–5	Cameroon	2–4	1–1
Burundi	0–2	Nigeria	0–1	0–1

13 January 2024
16:00 UTC+1

Morocco	2–0	Ethiopia
Zouhir 10'; Basser 51'	Report

Ben M'Hamed El Abdi Stadium, El Jadida
Referee: Shamirah Nabadda (Uganda)
21 January 2024
15:00 UTC+3

Ethiopia	1–0	Morocco
Tsehaynesh 52'	Report

Abebe Bikila Stadium, Addis Ababa

Morocco won 2–1 on aggregate and qualified for the 2024 FIFA U-20 Women's World Cup.

13 January 2024
17:00 UTC+0

Senegal	0–2	Ghana
	Report	Twum 5', 7'

Stade Lat-Dior, Thiès
Referee: Rosa Hanjavola (Madagascar)
21 January 2024
16:00 UTC+0

Ghana	5–1	Senegal
Nyame 18'; B. Nyarko 23', 72'; Twum 67' (pen.); Abdulai 78'	Report	Ba 5'

Baba Yara Stadium, Kumasi

Ghana won 7–1 on aggregate and qualified for the 2024 FIFA U-20 Women's World Cup.

12 January 2024
17:00 UTC+2

Egypt	2–4	Cameroon
N. Ramadan 17' (pen.); J. Emad 32' (pen.)	Report	Lemana 14'; Lamine 30', 78'; Meva Kiki 90+3'

Alexandria Stadium, Alexandria
Referee: Aissata Boudy Lam (Mauritania)
21 January 2024
15:00 UTC+1

Cameroon	1–1	Egypt
Lamine 74'	Report	H. Essam 40'

Stade de la Réunification, Douala
Referee: Suavis Iratunga (Burundi)

Cameroon won 5–3 on aggregate and qualified for the 2024 FIFA U-20 Women's World Cup.

14 January 2024
16:00 UTC+3

Burundi	0–1	Nigeria
	Report	Aikekoromowei 45' (pen.)

Azam Complex Stadium, Dar es Salaam (Tanzania)
20 January 2024
16:00 UTC+1

Nigeria	1–0	Burundi
Ajakaye 79'	Report

Moshood Abiola National Stadium, Abuja
Referee: (Tunisia)

Nigeria won 2–0 on aggregate and qualified for the 2024 FIFA U-20 Women's World Cup.

== Qualified teams for FIFA U-20 Women's World Cup ==
The following four teams from CAF qualified for the 2024 FIFA U-20 Women's World Cup in Colombia.

Team	Qualified on	Previous appearances in FIFA U-20 Women's World Cup^{1}
Nigeria	20 January 2024	10 (2002, 2004, 2006, 2008, 2010, 2012, 2014, 2016, 2018, 2022)
Morocco	21 January 2024	0 (debut)
Cameroon	21 January 2024	0 (debut)
Ghana	21 January 2024	6 (2010, 2012, 2014, 2016, 2018, 2022)

^{1} Bold indicates champions for that year. Italic indicates hosts for that year.

== Goalscorers ==
There were 183 goals scored in 54 matches, for an average of 3.39 goals per match.

6 goals

- (Cameroon) Naomi Ndjoah Eto

5 goals

- (Cameroon) Annie Félicia Enganemben
- (Ethiopia) Emush Daniel
- (Kenya) Charity Midewa

4 goals

- (Egypt) Joy Emad
- (Ghana) Beline Nyarko
- (Ghana) Tracey Twum
- (Guinea) Maman Sata Fancinadouno
- (Kenya) Valerie Nekesa
- (Tanzania) Jamila Rajabu

3 goals

- (Cameroon) Mana Lamine
- (Egypt) Nour Abdel Wahed Al-Sayed
- (Egypt) Maya Ehab
- (Egypt) Habiba Essam
- (Egypt) Dana Karim
- (Egypt) Hala Mustafa
- (Ghana) Mercy Attobra
- (Morocco) Doha El Madani
- (Senegal) Aissatou Chris Ba
- (Tanzania) Winifrida Gerald
- (Uganda) Agnes Nabukenya
- (Uganda) Hadijah Nandago

2 goals

- (Burundi) Rukiya Bizimana
- (Burundi) Annociate Nshimirimana
- (Egypt) Nora Khaled
- (Egypt) Habiba Tariq
- (Ethiopia) Nigist Bekele
- (Ethiopia) Mesay Temesgen
- (Ghana) Wasiima Mohammed
- (Ghana) Sarah Nyarko
- (Guinea) Nency Kourouma
- (Guinea) Suzanne Lamah
- (Guinea-Bissau) Mirna Jose Nunes Correia
- (Guinea-Bissau) Fidelia Da Costa
- (Morocco) Yasmine Zouhir
- (Nigeria) Janet Aikekoromowei

1 goal

- (Algeria) Leïla El Hadj
- (Angola) Ivone Candido
- (Botswana) Lebogang Dilelo
- (Burkina Faso) Helbi Mounifatou
- (Burundi) Chanceline Akimana
- (Cameroon) Sophie Lemana
- (Cameroon) Christiane Meva Kiki
- (Cameroon) Louise Wehiong
- (Republic of the Congo) Welcome Akouala
- (Republic of the Congo) Pauline Mbayo
- (Republic of the Congo) Merveille Ndengo
- (Republic of the Congo) Dornelia Ntsiba
- (Republic of the Congo) Ruth Tokassi
- (Democratic Republic of the Congo) Makila Jenovic
- (Democratic Republic of the Congo) Feza Kalomba
- (Democratic Republic of the Congo) Grâce Lubiku
- (Democratic Republic of the Congo) Gloria Nosa
- (Democratic Republic of the Congo) Ruth Nyamboki
- (Egypt) Farah Hisham
- (Egypt) Yara Khaled
- (Egypt) Habiba Omar
- (Egypt) Nadia Ramadan
- (Egypt) Camelia Shehata
- (Equatorial Guinea) Julia Raquel Bopopo
- (Equatorial Guinea) Júlia Etopa
- (Eswatini) Nkosephayo Nkambule
- (Ethiopia) Bethlehem Bekele
- (Ethiopia) Meadin Sahilu
- (Ethiopia) Jula Tsehaynesh
- (Ghana) Salamatu Abdulai
- (Ghana) Helen Alormemu
- (Ghana) Success Ameyaa
- (Ghana) Mary Amponsah
- (Ghana) Mafia Nyame
- (Guinea) Fatoumata Yaya Samoura
- (Guinea) Fanta Sidibé
- (Guinea-Bissau) Cumba Camara
- (Guinea-Bissau) Binta Mané
- (Kenya) Anna Arusi
- (Kenya) Rebecca Kwoba
- (Kenya) Faith Naliaka
- (Mali) Djamako Traoré
- (Morocco) Ambre Basser
- (Morocco) Sofia Boussate
- (Morocco) Dania Boussatta
- (Morocco) Zina El Asri
- (Morocco) Mina El Hamzaoui
- (Morocco) Samya Masnaoui
- (Morocco) Nehla Sadiki
- (Namibia) Albertine Fillipus
- (Nigeria) Esther Ajakaye
- (Nigeria) Comfort Folorunsho
- (Nigeria) Chioma Olise
- (Senegal) Khadija Badio
- (Senegal) Adji Ndiaye
- (South Africa) Lindelwa Mabuza
- (South Africa) Andrielle Mibe
- (Tanzania) Yasinta Joseph
- (Tanzania) Noela Luhala
- (Tanzania) Yasinta Mitoga
- (Tanzania) Diana Mnali
- (Tanzania) Jamila Mnundika
- (Tanzania) Zainabu Mohamed
- (Tanzania) Hasnath Ubamba
- (Togo) Tatiana Kayaba
- (Uganda) Margret Kunihira
- (Uganda) Phionah Nabulime
- (Uganda) Eva Naggayi
- (Zambia) Mary Mbewe
- (Zambia) Lydia Shamalima

1 own goal

- (Algeria) Lina Berkous (against Mali)
- (Eswatini) ??? (against Ghana)
- (Mali) Alima Cissé (against Algeria)
- (Namibia) Prisca Amuntale (against Congo)

== See also ==
- 2024 Women's Africa Cup of Nations
- 2024 African U-17 Women's World Cup Qualifying Tournament
