= 2024 COSAFA U-20 Women's Championship =

COSAFA U-20 Women's Championship 2024

Tournament details
- Host country: South Africa
- Dates: 19 – 24 November
- Teams: 5 (from 1 sub-confederation)
- Venue: 1 (in 1 host city)

Final positions
- Champions: Zambia (1st title)
- Runners-up: South Africa
- Third place: Mozambique

Tournament statistics
- Matches played: 10
- Goals scored: 42 (4.2 per match)
- Top scorer(s): (South Africa) Adrielle Mibe (Zambia) Ruth Muwowo (4 goals each)
- Best player: (Zambia) Saliya Mwanza
- Best goalkeeper: (Zambia) Mwila Mufunte
- Fair play award: Lesotho

The 2024 COSAFA U-20 Women's Championship was the second edition of the COSAFA U-20 Women's Championship, the international women's youth football championship contested by the under-20 women's national teams of the member associations of COSAFA. The tournament was hosted in Johannesburg, South Africa from 19 to 24 November 2024.

East African guest nation Tanzania were the inaugural Champions when they lifted a maiden title in 2019 with a 2–1 victory over Zambia in the final. As the Twiga Stars did not return for this edition the tournament saw a COSAFA member claim the title for the first time, with Zambia clinching the championship undefeated and without conceding a goal, while host South Africa finished second.

== Format ==
Unlike the previous edition, which featured a group stage followed by semifinals and a final, This year's competition followed a round-robin format due to the lower number of participants. Each of the five teams faced the others once, earning three points for a win, one for a draw, and zero for a loss. The team with the most points was crowned the 2024 champions.

== Participation ==
=== Participating teams ===
Initially, only 4 out of 14 COSAFA members entered the second edition. However, Zambia was added to the lineup on 11 November 2024, bringing the total to 5 teams. Lesotho made their debut in the competition after missing the inaugural edition in 2019.

Team	App	Last	Previous best performance
Botswana	2nd	2019	Group stage (2019)
Lesotho	1st	—	Debut
Mozambique	2nd	2019	Group stage (2019)
South Africa	2nd	2019	Third place (2019)
Zambia	2nd	2019	Runners-up (2019)

Did not enter

- Angola
- Comoros
- Eswatini
- Madagascar
- Malawi
- Mauritius
- Namibia
- Seychelles
- Zimbabwe

=== Draw ===
The tournament draw took place at COSAFA House in Johannesburg, South Africa, on 13 October 2024 at 17:00 SAST (UTC+2).

the pre-determined fixtures:

MD	Date	Matches
1	19 November 2024	A2 v A3, A1 v A4
2	20 November 2024	A5 v A4, A1 v A3
3	22 November 2024	A5 v A3, A1 v A2
4	23 November 2024	A3 v A4, A2 v A4
5	24 November 2024	A4 v A2, A1 v A5

The draw resulted in the following positions:

Pos	Team
A1	South Africa
A2	Lesotho
A3	Zambia
A4	Mozambique
A5	Botswana

=== Squads ===
Each of the five participating national teams was required to register a squad of up to 20 players. with Players born between 1 January 2004 and 31 December 2008 were eligible to compete in the tournament.

== Venue ==
All the matches will be held on the University of Johannesburg's Soweto campus in Johannesburg.

Johannesburg	2024 COSAFA U-20 Women's Championship is located in South Africa
UJ Stadium	2024 COSAFA U-20 Women's Championship is located in South Africa
Capacity: 8,000	2024 COSAFA U-20 Women's Championship is located in South Africa

== Main tournament ==
All times are local, SAST (UTC+2). The match schedule was confirmed by COSAFA on 13 November 2024.

Tie-breaking criteria for separating teams on the table
Separating teams on the table was determined as follows:
1. Points obtained in all group matches;
2. Points obtained in the matches played between the teams in question;
3. Goal difference in all group matches;
4. Number of goals scored in all group matches;
5. Fair play points in all tournament matches:
  - Yellow card: −1 points;
  - Direct red card: −2 points;
6. Drawing of lots.

Pos	Team	Pld	W	D	L	GF	GA	GD	Pts	Final result
1	Zambia	4	4	0	0	19	0	+19	12	Champions
2	South Africa (H)	4	3	0	1	10	3	+7	9	Runners-up
3	Mozambique	4	1	1	2	6	10	−4	4	Third place
4	Lesotho	4	0	2	2	4	16	−12	2	
5	Botswana	4	0	1	3	3	13	−10	1	

Source: COSAFA
Rules for classification: Tiebreakers
(H) Hosts
19 November 2024
12:00

Lesotho	0–9	Zambia
	Report	Lubasi 11', 12'; Mwanza 14'; Chileshe 28', 54'; Mbewe 37'; Muwowo 65', 86'; J. Zulu 89'

UJ Soweto Campus, Johannesburg
Referee: Nonjabulo Ndlela (South Africa)
19 November 2024
15:00

South Africa	4–0	Mozambique
Mibe 25', 67', 71'; Mofolo 80'	Report

UJ Soweto Campus, Johannesburg
Referee: Itumeleng Methikga (Botswana)

20 November 2024
12:00

Botswana	2–3	Mozambique
Modisenyane 28'; Modise 41'	Report	Joana 5', 32'; Arménia 70' (pen.)

UJ Soweto Campus, Johannesburg
Referee: Annesta Chishimba Bwalya (Zambia)
20 November 2024
15:00

South Africa	0–3	Zambia
	Report	Muwowo 62'; Mwanza 83'; J. Zulu 90+5' (pen.)

UJ Soweto Campus, Johannesburg
Referee: Itumeleng Methikga (Botswana)

22 November 2024
12:00

Botswana	0–6	Zambia
	Report	Nambeye 1'; Mwanza 35'; Mbewe 41'; Mankgatau 62' (o.g.); Phiri 79'; Muwowo 83'

UJ Soweto Campus, Johannesburg
Referee: Cacilda Fernando (Mozambique)
22 November 2024
15:00

South Africa	3–0	Lesotho
Mibe 8'; Mdelwa 52'; Mabitsela 56'	Report

UJ Soweto Campus, Johannesburg
Referee: Rosalie (Madagascar)

23 November 2024
12:00

Zambia	1–0	Mozambique
Z. Zulu 30'	Report

UJ Soweto Campus, Johannesburg
Referee: Mathapelo Morake (Lesotho)
23 November 2024
15:00

Lesotho	1–1	Botswana
Sepiriti 32'	Report	Modise 1'

UJ Soweto Campus, Johannesburg
Referee: Nonjabulo Ndlela (South Africa)

24 November 2024
12:00

Mozambique	3–3	Lesotho
Beatriz Zaqueu 22'; Arménia 26'; Amélia 89'	Report	Tholoana 10'; Mofana 16'; Lekote 40'

UJ Soweto Campus, Johannesburg
Referee: Itumeleng Methikga (Botswana)
24 November 2024
15:00

South Africa	3–0	Botswana
Goncalves 45', 75', 80' (pen.)	Report

UJ Soweto Campus, Johannesburg
Referee: Rosalie (Madagascar)

== Goalscorers ==
There were 42 goals scored in 10 matches, for an average of 4.2 goals per match.

4 goals

- (South Africa) Adrielle Mibe
- (Zambia) Ruth Muwowo

3 goals

- (South Africa) Julia Goncalves
- (Zambia) Saliya Mwanza

2 goals

- (Botswana) Yaone Modise
- (Mozambique) Arménia Machava
- (Mozambique) Joana Mossueie
- (Zambia) Bwalya Chileshe
- (Zambia) Pumulo Lubasi
- (Zambia) Mary Mbewe
- (Zambia) Jessy Zulu

1 goal

- (Botswana) Serati Modisenyane
- (Lesotho) Tebello Lekote
- (Lesotho) Limpho Mofana
- (Lesotho) Mahali Sepiriti
- (Lesotho) Tṧoaeli Tholoana
- (Mozambique) Amélia Vasco
- (Mozambique) Beatriz Zaqueu
- (South Africa) Gugu Mabitsela
- (South Africa) Nobahle Mdelwa
- (South Africa) Thato Mofolo
- (Zambia) Jaqueline Nambeye
- (Zambia) Edith Phiri
- (Zambia) Zangose Zulu

1 own goal

- (Botswana) Ivy Mankgatau (against Zambia)

== See also ==
- 2024 COSAFA U-17 Girls' Championship
