= 2012 African U-20 Women's World Cup qualification =

2012 African U-20 Women's World Cup Qualifying Tournament
Tournament details
- Dates: 28 October 2011 – 20 May 2012
- Teams: 19 (from 1 confederation)

Tournament statistics
- Matches played: 29
- Goals scored: 106 (3.66 per match)

The 2012 African U-20 Women's World Cup Qualifying Tournament was the 6th edition of the African U-20 Women's World Cup Qualifying Tournament, the biennial international youth football competition organised by the Confederation of African Football (CAF) to determine which women's under-20 national teams from Africa qualify for the FIFA U-20 Women's World Cup.

19 teams entered the competition, but due to withdrawals only 16 actually played matches. The top two teams of the tournament Ghana and Nigeria qualified for the 2012 FIFA U-20 Women's World Cup in Japan as the CAF representatives.

== Preliminary round ==
The preliminary round was played on 28 and 29 October 2011 (first leg) and 19 November 2011 (second leg). Guinea withdrew from competition before the start of the 1st leg. As a result, Sierra Leone qualified for the next round. Comoros withdrew from competition before the start of the 2nd leg. As a result, Botswana qualified for the next round.

Team 1	Agg.	Team 2	1st leg	2nd leg
Kenya	4–2	Lesotho	2–2	2–0
Botswana	w/o	Comoros	6–1	—
Guinea	w/o	Sierra Leone	—	—

Kenya	2−2	Lesotho

Lesotho	0−2	Kenya

Kenya won 4−2 on aggregate and advanced to the first round.

Botswana	6−1	Comoros

Comoros	Cancelled	Botswana
w/o

Botswana won on walkover after Comoros did not appear for the second leg and advanced to the first round.

Guinea	Cancelled	Sierra Leone
w/o

Sierra Leone won on walkover after Guinea did not appear for the first leg and advanced to the first round.

== First round ==
The first round was held on 17–19 February 2012 (first leg) and 2–3 March 2012 (second leg). Sierra Leone withdrew from competition before the start of the 1st leg due to a lack of funds. As a result, Nigeria qualified for the next round.

Team 1	Agg.	Team 2	1st leg	2nd leg
Zimbabwe	7–0	Mozambique	4–0	3–0
Mali	6–1	Equatorial Guinea	4–0	2–1
Cameroon	2–3	DR Congo	1–2	1–1
Zambia	2–5	Kenya	2–1	0–4
Morocco	1–5	Tunisia	0–5	1–0
Botswana	2–7	South Africa	1–4	1–3
Ghana	10–0	Namibia	7–0	3–0
Sierra Leone	w/o	Nigeria	—	—

Zimbabwe	4−0	Mozambique

Mozambique	0−3	Zimbabwe

Zimbabwe won 7−0 on aggregate and advanced to the second round.

Mali	4−0	Equatorial Guinea

Equatorial Guinea	1−2	Mali

Mali won 6−1 on aggregate and advanced to the second round.

Cameroon	1−2	DR Congo

DR Congo	1−1	Cameroon

DR Congo won 3−2 on aggregate and advanced to the second round.

Zambia	2−1	Kenya

Kenya	4−0	Zambia

Kenya won 5−2 on aggregate and advanced to the second round.

Morocco	0−5	Tunisia
	Report	Maknoun 20' 30'; Majri 27' 90'; Houij 80'

Tunisia	0−1	Morocco
	Report	El Jazouli

Tunisia won 5−1 on aggregate and advanced to the second round.

Botswana	1−4	South Africa

South Africa	3−1	Botswana

South Africa won 7−2 on aggregate and advanced to the second round.

Ghana	7−0	Namibia

Namibia	0−3	Ghana

Ghana won 10−0 on aggregate and advanced to the second round.

Sierra Leone	Cancelled	Nigeria
w/o

Nigeria won on walkover after Sierra Leone did not appear for the first leg and advanced to the second round.

== Second round ==
The second round was held on 30–31 Mar or 1 Apr (first leg) and 13–15 April 2012 (second leg).

Team 1	Agg.	Team 2	1st leg	2nd leg
Kenya	2–4	Tunisia	1–2	1–2
South Africa	0–5	Ghana	0–2	0–3
Nigeria	6–0	Zimbabwe	3–0	3–0
Mali	3–6	DR Congo	1–3	2–3

31 March 2012

Kenya	1–2	Tunisia
Sharon 71'	Report	Kaabachi 7' ? 38'

Nairobi
14 April 2012

Tunisia	2–1	Kenya
Kaabachi 12'; Majri 72'	Report	Atieno 90'

Tunisia won 4−2 on aggregate and advanced to the third round.

31 March 2012

South Africa	0–2	Ghana
	Report	Dadson 50'; Addo

Sinaba Stadium, Daveyton
14 April 2012

Ghana	3–0	South Africa
Saahene 11'; Ayieam 65'; Addo 72'	Report

Accra

Ghana won 5−0 on aggregate and advanced to the third round.

31 March 2012

Nigeria	3–0	Zimbabwe
Ordega 26', 80'; Sunday	Report

MKO Abiola Stadium, Abeokuta
15 April 2012

Zimbabwe	0–3	Nigeria
	Report	Oparanozie 10'; Sunday 27'; Orji 86'

Harare

Nigeria won 6−0 on aggregate and advanced to the third round.

7 April 2012

Mali	1–3	DR Congo
Tangara 45+1'	Report	Mayala 31'; Solange 45+2'; Kujoya 87'

21 April 2012

DR Congo	3–2	Mali

Bamako

RD Congo won 6−3 on aggregate and advanced to the third round.

== Third round ==
The third round was held on 4–6 May 2012 (first leg) and 18–20 May 2012 (second leg). The winners of the two third round matches qualified directly to the 2012 FIFA U-20 Women's World Cup held in Japan.

Team 1	Agg.	Team 2	1st leg	2nd leg
Tunisia	2–7	Ghana	1–3	1–4
Nigeria	7–0	DR Congo	4–0	3–0

4–6 May 2012

Tunisia	1–3	Ghana

18–20 May 2012

Ghana	4–1	Tunisia

Ghana won 7−2 on aggregate and qualified to 2012 FIFA U20 W-WC.

4–6 May 2012

Nigeria	4–0	DR Congo

18–20 May 2012

DR Congo	0–3	Nigeria

Nigeria won 7−0 on aggregate and qualified to 2012 FIFA U20 W-WC.

== Qualified teams for FIFA U-20 Women's World Cup ==
The following two teams from CAF qualified for the FIFA U-20 Women's World Cup.

Team	Qualified on	Previous appearances in tournament
Ghana	19 May 2012	1 (2010)
Nigeria	19 May 2012	5 (2002, 2004, 2006, 2008, 2010)
