= COSAFA U-20 Women's Championship =

- Organiser(s): COSAFA
- Founded: 2019; 7 years ago
- Region: Southern Africa
- Teams: 5 (as of 2024)
- Current champions: Zambia (1st title)
- Most championships: Tanzania; Zambia (1 title each)
- Website: Official website
- 2025 COSAFA U-20 Women's Championship

COSAFA U-20 Women's Championship is a football tournament for under-20 women's teams from southern Africa organized by Council of Southern Africa Football Associations (COSAFA). The first edition of the tournament was held in South Africa in 2019 with guest nation Tanzania coming out as champions. The 2020 tournament was canceled due to COVID-19 pandemic.

== Results ==
Ed.	Year	Host	Final			Third place game			Num. teams
Ed.	Year	Host	(gold) Champions	Score	(silver) Runners-up	(bronze) Third place	Score	Fourth place	Num. teams
1	2019	(South Africa) Port Elizabeth	Tanzania^{[G]}	2–1	Zambia	South Africa	1–1 (4–3 p)	Zimbabwe	8
2	2024	(South Africa) Johannesburg	Zambia	Round-robin	South Africa	Mozambique	Round-robin	Lesotho	5
3	2025	(Namibia) Windhoek	Zambia	2–0	South Africa	Botswana	1–0	Namibia	8

Guest team (G): An invited guest team, not a member of COSAFA.

== Awards ==
Tournament	Player of the Tournament	Golden Boot	Goals	Golden Glove	Fair Play
South Africa 2019	(Tanzania) Enekia Lunyamila	(Zambia) Maylan Mulenga	5	(Zimbabwe) Cynthia Shonga	—N/a
South Africa 2024	(Zambia) Saliya Mwanza	(South Africa) Adrielle Mibe (Zambia) Ruth Muwowo	4	(Zambia) Mwila Mufunte	Lesotho
Namibia 2025	(Zambia) Saliya Mwanza	(Zambia) Bwalya Chileshe (Zambia) Ruth Mukoma	6	(Zambia) Margaret Phiri	Namibia
