= African U-20 Women's World Cup qualification =

Qualification for the FIFA U-20 Women's World Cup for African nations

- Organiser(s): CAF
- Founded: 2002
- Region: Africa
- Teams: 35 (2024)
- 2026 African U-20 Women's World Cup qualification

The African U-20 Women's World Cup qualification is a biennial youth women's association football qualification competition for the FIFA U-20 Women's World Cup organized by the Confederation of African Football for its nations.

A final was played in the first two editions in 2002 and 2004 as only one team qualified for the first two editions of the U-20 Women's World Cup in those years. Since 2006, with the confederation granted a second spot, all qualification editions till date were and are played in a home-and-away knock-out format until 4 teams are left with half that number booking their spots at the international tournament. On 7 June 2023, CAF revealed the formats for the qualification procedures for the next editions of the FIFA U-20 and U-17 Women's World Cups, the former whose draw was conducted the following day.

== Results ==
=== African U-19 Women's Championship ===
Only the winner is guaranteed a spot at the FIFA U-20 Women's World Cup for its first two editions.

Year	Hosts	Final match			Semi-finalists	
Year	Hosts	Champion	Score	Runner-up	Semi-finalists	
2002	Home sites	Nigeria	6–0	South Africa	Central African Republic	Morocco
2002	Home sites	Nigeria	3–2	South Africa	Central African Republic	Morocco
2004	Home sites	Nigeria	1–0	South Africa	DR Congo	Equatorial Guinea
2004	Home sites	Nigeria	0–0	South Africa	DR Congo	Equatorial Guinea

=== African U-20 Women's World Cup qualification ===
Year	Hosts	Final round		
Year	Hosts	Winners (to FIFA U-20 Women's World Cup)	Agg. Score	Runners-up
2006	Home sites	Nigeria	bye (Note: Nigeria were drawn to play the winner of Cameroon and Ghana, but both teams were ejected from the competition.)	n/a
2006	Home sites	DR Congo	w/o	Equatorial Guinea
2008	Home sites	Nigeria	5–2	Ghana
2008	Home sites	DR Congo	3–3 (a)	South Africa
2010	Home sites	Ghana	5–0	DR Congo
2010	Home sites	Nigeria	12–3	South Africa
2012	Home sites	Ghana	7–2	Tunisia
2012	Home sites	Nigeria	7–0	DR Congo
2014	Home sites	Ghana	1–1 (4–3 p)	Equatorial Guinea
2014	Home sites	Nigeria	7–0	South Africa
2015	Home sites	Ghana	6–2	Ethiopia
2015	Home sites	Nigeria	3–1	South Africa
2018	Home sites	Ghana	4–1	Cameroon
2018	Home sites	Nigeria	8–0	South Africa
2020	Not completed as 2020 FIFA U-20 Women's World Cup was cancelled due to COVID-19 pandemic			
2022	Home sites	Ghana	5–1	Ethiopia
2022	Home sites	Nigeria	7–2	Senegal
2024	Home sites	Morocco	2–1	Ethiopia
2024	Home sites	Ghana	7–1	Senegal
2024	Home sites	Cameroon	5–3	Egypt
2024	Home sites	Nigeria	2–0	Burundi
2026	Home sites	To be determined		

== FIFA U-20 Women's World Cup qualification and results ==
Five different teams have qualified for the FIFA U-20 Women's World Cup as of the 2024 edition; Nigeria, Ghana, the Democratic Republic of Congo, Cameroon and Morocco. Nigeria has been the only team to reach the quarter-finals, the semi-finals and the final: finishing at the 2nd place twice in 2010 and 2014 and 4th in 2012. Ghana and the Democratic Republic of Congo have been eliminated in the group stages.

World Cup	(Canada) 2002	(Thailand) 2004	(Russia) 2006	(Chile) 2008	(Germany) 2010	(Japan) 2012	(Canada) 2014	(Papua New Guinea) 2016	(France) 2018	(Costa Rica) 2022	(Colombia) 2024	(Poland) 2026	Total
Cameroon											R16		1
DR Congo			GS	GS									2
Ghana					GS	GS	GS	GS	GS	GS	GS		7
Morocco											GS		1
Nigeria	GS	QF	QF	QF	2nd	4th	2nd	GS	QF	QF	R16		11
Total	1	1	2	2	2	2	2	2	2	2	4	4	

Legend

- 1st — Champions
- 2nd — Runners-up
- 3rd — Third place
- 4th — Fourth place
- QF – Quarter-finals
- GS – Group stage
- Q – Qualified

== Country participation ==
Legend

- 1st — Champions
- 2nd — Runners-up
- 3rd — Third place
- 4th — Fourth place
- SF — Semi-final
- QF — Quarterfinal
- Q — Qualified for FIFA U-20 WC
- PR — Preliminary Round
- R1 — Round 1
- R2 — Round 2
- R3 — Round 3
- • — Withdrew
- — Did not enter
- — Hosts
- q — Qualified for upcoming competition

Team	2002	2004	2006	2008	2010	2012	2014	2015	2018	2020	2022	2024	2026	Total
Algeria			R1					R1	R1	q		R1		4
Angola										q	R1	R1		2
Benin			PR	•							R1	R2		3
Botswana	•			R1	R1	R1	R1	R1	PR	q	R2	R1		8
Burkina Faso								R2		q	R1	R1		3
Burundi									R2		R2	R3		3
Cameroon			R2	R1		R1		R1	R3	q	R3	Q		7
Chad												•		0
Central African Republic	SF				R1						R1			3
Comoros						•								0
Congo			•	•	R1					q	R2	R3		3
DR Congo		SF	Q	Q	R3	R3		R2		•	R1	R3		8
Djibouti								PR	PR		PR	R1		4
Egypt			R2	R1	R1		R1			q	R1	R3		6
Eswatini											PR	R3		2
Ethiopia			•					R3	R1	q	R4	R3		4
Equatorial Guinea	R1	SF	R3			R1	R3	R2			•	R2		7
Eritrea			R1								R1			2
Gabon								PR		q	R2	•		2
Gambia	•									q	R2			1
Ghana			R2	R2	Q	Q	Q	Q	Q	q	Q	Q		9
Guinea			•	PR		•			R1	q	R2	R3		4
Guinea-Bissau							R1			q	R1	R2		3
Ivory Coast							R1							1
Kenya			R1		•	R2			R2		R1	R3		5
Lesotho				PR		PR								2
Liberia			R2					R1		q				2
Libya									•			•		0
Madagascar		•	•	PR										1
Malawi	•									q	R1			1
Mali	QF		R1			R2		R1			R1	R3		6
Mauritius				R1								•		1
Mauritania										q	R1			1
Morocco	SF	R1	R1			R1	R1		R2	q	R3	Q		8
Mozambique		•	R1	PR	•	R1	R1				R1	R1		6
Namibia				•	R2	R1	R1	R1	R1	q	R1	R1		7
Niger	QF										PR	R1		3
Nigeria	1st	1st	Q	Q	Q	Q	Q	Q	Q	q	Q	Q		11
Réunion					R1									1
Rwanda					PR				•		R1			2
São Tomé and Príncipe					•						PR	R1		2
Senegal			R1					R1	R1	q	R4	R3		5
Sierra Leone					•	R1	R1	•	R2	q	R1			4
South Africa	2nd	2nd	R2	R2	R3	R2	R3	R3	R3	q	R2	R1		11
South Sudan							PR			q	•			1
Tanzania							R2	R1	R1	q	R3	R3		5
Togo					•						•	PR		1
Tunisia						R2	R3	R2	•		•			4
Uganda										q	R3	R3		2
Zambia	QF		PR	PR	R2	R1	R2	R2		q	R3	R2		9
Zimbabwe	QF		R1	•	R2	R2				q				4
Total	13	7	22	16	18	19	17	19	16	28	40	35		

== See also ==
- Women's Africa Cup of Nations
- CAF Women's Champions League
- African U-17 Women's World Cup qualification
