= 2019 COSAFA U-20 Women's Championship =

Tournament details
- Host country: South Africa
- Dates: 1–11 August 2019
- Teams: 8 (from 1 confederation)
- Venue(s): 2 (in 1 host city)

Final positions
- Champions: Tanzania (1st title)
- Runners-up: Zambia
- Third place: South Africa
- Fourth place: Zimbabwe

Tournament statistics
- Matches played: 16
- Goals scored: 52 (3.25 per match)
- Top scorer(s): (Zambia) Maylan Mulenga
- Best player(s): (Tanzania) Enekia Lunyamila
- Best goalkeeper: (Zimbabwe) Cynthia Shonga

The 2019 COSAFA U-20 Women's Championship was the first edition of the COSAFA U-20 Women's Championship, an international football tournament, for national women's under-20 teams organized by COSAFA. The tournament was played between 1-11 August in Nelson Mandela Bay, South Africa. Invited from CECAFA, Tanzania became champions after winning 2-1 over Zambia in the final.

== Participants ==
Seven of the 14 nations in COSAFA was represented in this tournament, along with the invited CECAFA nation Tanzania. There was a late change in the line-up when Mozambique took Malawi's spot.

- Botswana
- Eswatini
- Mozambique
- Namibia
- South Africa (host)
- Tanzania (guest)
- Zambia
- Zimbabwe

== Group stage ==
The 8 teams were on 3 July, drawn into 2 groups and, played against each other once in a round-robin. The top two teams advanced to the semi-finals.

=== Group A ===
| Pos | Team | Pld | W | D | L | GF | GA | GD | Pts | Qualification |
|---|---|---|---|---|---|---|---|---|---|---|
| 1 | South Africa (H) | 3 | 3 | 0 | 0 | 7 | 1 | +6 | 9 | Advance to Semi-finals |
| 2 | Zimbabwe | 3 | 2 | 0 | 1 | 8 | 3 | +5 | 6 | Advance to Semi-finals |
| 3 | Namibia | 3 | 1 | 0 | 2 | 2 | 6 | −4 | 3 | |
| 4 | Mozambique | 3 | 0 | 0 | 3 | 2 | 9 | −7 | 0 | |

Source: COSAFA
(H) Hosts
1 August 2019
11:00

| Namibia | 2–1 | Mozambique |
|---|---|---|
| Jacobs 53'; April 60' | Report | Lopes 25' |

Gelvandale Stadium, Gqeberha
1 August 2019
14:00

| South Africa | 3–0 | Zimbabwe |
|---|---|---|
| Joss 52'; Jacobs 63'; Edwards 90' | Report |

Gelvandale Stadium, Gqeberha

3 August 2019
11:00

| Zimbabwe | 4–0 | Mozambique |
|---|---|---|
| Bizeki 17'; Banda 35'; Shonga 78' (pen.); Mudimu 79' | Report |

Gelvandale Stadium, Gqeberha
3 August 2019
14:00

| Namibia | 0–1 | South Africa |
|---|---|---|
| | Report | Jacobs 10' |

Gelvandale Stadium, Gqeberha

5 August 2019
10:00

| South Africa | 3–1 | Mozambique |
|---|---|---|
| Mokwena 7'; Jacobs 72'; Vilakazi 86' | Report | Lunguile 5' |

Wolfson Stadium, Ibhayi
5 August 2019
10:00

| Namibia | 0–4 | Zimbabwe |
|---|---|---|
| | Report | Bizeki 16'; Banda 32', 45'; Zvawanda 38' |

Gelvandale Stadium, Gqeberha

=== Group B ===
| Pos | Team | Pld | W | D | L | GF | GA | GD | Pts | Qualification |
|---|---|---|---|---|---|---|---|---|---|---|
| 1 | Zambia | 3 | 3 | 0 | 0 | 10 | 2 | +8 | 9 | Advance to semi-finals |
| 2 | Tanzania | 3 | 2 | 0 | 1 | 11 | 2 | +9 | 6 | Advance to semi-finals |
| 3 | Botswana | 3 | 1 | 0 | 2 | 4 | 6 | −2 | 3 | |
| 4 | Eswatini | 3 | 0 | 0 | 3 | 0 | 15 | −15 | 0 | |

Source: COSAFA
2 August 2019
11:00

| Botswana | 0–2 | Tanzania |
|---|---|---|
| | Report | Sanga 38'; Radipitse 46' (o.g.) |

Gelvandale Stadium, Gqeberha
2 August 2019
14:00

| Zambia | 4–0 | Eswatini |
|---|---|---|
| Mulenga 15', 50'; Mambwe 23'; Gamedze 62' (o.g.) | Report |

Gelvandale Stadium, Gqeberha

4 August 2019
11:00

| Botswana | 1–4 | Zambia |
|---|---|---|
| George 45' | Report | Mulenga 20', 68'; Ndhlovu 45'; Mambwe 62' |

Gelvandale Stadium, Gqeberha
4 August 2019
14:00

| Tanzania | 8–0 | Eswatini |
|---|---|---|
| Lunyamila 24', 74'; Masaka 39', 51', 58'; Kisisa 44'; Salum 75'; Gindulya 87' | Report |

Gelvandale Stadium, Gqeberha

6 August 2019
12:00

| Botswana | 3–0 | Eswatini |
|---|---|---|
| Radipitse 35'; Seambala 46'; Senwelo 80' | Report |

Gelvandale Stadium, Gqeberha
6 August 2019
12:00

| Zambia | 2–1 | Tanzania |
|---|---|---|
| Kasonde 4'; Kalange 61' | Report | Lunyamila 84' |

Wolfson Stadium, Ibhayi

== Knockout stage ==
=== Playoff-bracket ===
Semi-finals
Zambia | 1
Zimbabwe | 0
South Africa | 0
Tanzania | 2

Final
Zambia | 1
Tanzania | 2
Third place
Zimbabwe | 1 (3)
South Africa | 1 (4)

=== Semi-finals ===
8 August 2019
10:00

| Zambia | 1–0 | Zimbabwe |
|---|---|---|
| Mambwe 30' | Report |

Gelvandale Stadium, Port Elizabeth
8 August 2019
14:00

| South Africa | 0–2 | Tanzania |
|---|---|---|
| | Report | Lunyamila 17'; Sanga 29' |

Gelvandale Stadium, Port Elizabeth

=== Bronze medal game ===
10 August 2019
11:00

| Zimbabwe | 1–1 | South Africa |
|---|---|---|
| Zvawanda 45' | Report | Jacobs 43' |
Penalties
| | 3–4 |

Wolfson Stadium, Ibhayi

=== Final ===
11 August 2019
10:00

| Zambia | 1–2 | Tanzania |
|---|---|---|
| Malunga 56' | Report | Sanga 24'; Mbunda 86' |

Wolfson Stadium, Ibhayi

== Goalscorers ==
There were 52 goals scored in 16 matches, for an average of 3.25 goals per match.

4 goals

- (South Africa) Shakeerah Jacobs
- (Tanzania) Enekia Lunyamila
- (Zambia) Maylan Mulenga

3 goals

- (Tanzania) Aisha Masaka
- (Tanzania) Opa Sanga
- (Zambia) Mary Mambwe
- (Zimbabwe) Dinah Banda

2 goals

- (Zimbabwe) Talent Bizeki
- (Zimbabwe) Praynence Zvawanda

1 goal

- (Botswana) Theo George
- (Botswana) Thuto Radipitse
- (Botswana) Getrude Seambala
- (Botswana) Leungo Senwelo
- (Mozambique) Dulce Lopes
- (Mozambique) Leia Lunguile
- (Namibia) Veronica April
- (Namibia) Indira Jacobs
- (South Africa) Ember Edwards
- (South Africa) Tyla-Bree Joss
- (South Africa) Oratile Mokwena
- (South Africa) Zethembiso Vilakazi
- (Tanzania) Ester Gindulya
- (Tanzania) Irene Kisisa
- (Tanzania) Protasia Mbunda
- (Tanzania) Shamimu Salum
- (Zambia) Christine Kalange
- (Zambia) Florence Kasonde
- (Zambia) Loveness Malunga
- (Zambia) Thandiwe Ndhlovu
- (Zimbabwe) Rennie Mudimu
- (Zimbabwe) Cynthia Shonga

1 own goal

- (Botswana) Thuto Radipitse (against Tanzania)
- (Eswatini) Ncedo Gamedze (against Zambia)
