= 2010 African U-20 Women's World Cup qualification =

2010 African U-20 Women's World Cup Qualifying Tournament
Tournament details
- Dates: 24 October 2009 – 27 March 2010
- Teams: 18 (from 1 confederation)

Tournament statistics
- Matches played: 21
- Goals scored: 80 (3.81 per match)

The 2010 African U-20 Women's World Cup Qualifying Tournament was the 5th edition of the African U-20 Women's World Cup Qualifying Tournament, the biennial international youth football competition organised by the Confederation of African Football (CAF) to determine which women's under-20 national teams from Africa qualify for the FIFA U-20 Women's World Cup.

Players born on or after 1 January 1990 are eligible to compete in the tournament. The top two teams of the tournament Ghana and Nigeria qualified for the 2010 FIFA U-20 Women's World Cup in Germany as the CAF representatives.

== Preliminary round ==
In this preliminary round, São Tomé and Príncipe withdrew from competition before the start of the 1st leg. As a result, Central African Republic qualified for the next round.

Mozambique, Kenya, Togo, and Sierra Leone all withdrew from preliminary competition.

Team 1	Agg.	Team 2	1st leg	2nd leg
Uganda	3–1	Rwanda	2–1	1–0
Madagascar	2–7	Réunion	1–4	1–3
Central African Republic	w/o	São Tomé and Príncipe	—	—
Mozambique	np	Kenya	—	—
Togo	np	Sierra Leone	—	—
Botswana	bye			
Congo	bye			
DR Congo	bye			
Egypt	bye			
Ghana	bye			
Namibia	bye			
Nigeria	bye			
South Africa	bye			
Tunisia	bye			
Zambia	bye			
Zimbabwe	bye			

24 October 2009

Uganda	2−1	Rwanda

7 November 2009

Rwanda	0−1	Uganda

Uganda won 3−1 on aggregate and advanced to the first round.

Madagascar	1−4	Réunion

Réunion	3−1	Madagascar

Réunion won 7−2 on aggregate and advanced to the first round.

Central African Republic	Cancelled	São Tomé and Príncipe
		w/o

Central African Rep. won on walkover after São Tomé and Príncipe did not appear for the first leg and advanced to the first round.

== First round ==
In the first round, Tunisia, Ghana, and Zambia qualified for the next round after that Egypt, Congo and Uganda withdrew from competition before the start of the 1st leg.

There was no matches due to withdrawal of Mozambique, Kenya, Togo and Sierra Leone. As a result, Zimbabwe and Nigeria qualified for the next round.

Team 1	Agg.	Team 2	1st leg	2nd leg
Central African Republic	1–3	DR Congo	0–2	1–1
Botswana	3–3 (3–4 p)	Namibia	1–2	2–1
Réunion	3–6	South Africa	3–4	0–2
Tunisia	w/o	Egypt	—	—
Congo	w/o	Ghana	—	—
Uganda	w/o	Zambia	—	—
Winner of matches 7–8	np	Zimbabwe	—	—
Winner of matches 9–10	np	Nigeria	—	—

Central African Republic	0−2	DR Congo

DR Congo	1−1	Central African Republic

DR Congo won 3−1 on aggregate and advanced to the second round.

Botswana	1−2	Namibia

Namibia	1−2	Botswana
Penalties
	4–3

Namibia won on penalties free kick 4−3 after a draw of 3−3 on aggregate and advanced to the second round.

Réunion	3−4	South Africa

South Africa	2−0	Réunion

South Africa won 6−3 on aggregate and advanced to the second round.

Tunisia	Cancelled	Egypt
		w/o

Tunisia won on walkover after Egypt did not appear for the first leg and advanced to the second round.

Congo	Cancelled	Ghana
w/o

Ghana won on walkover after Congo did not appear for the first leg and advanced to the second round.

Uganda	Cancelled	Zambia
w/o

Zambia won on walkover after Uganda did not appear for the first leg and advanced to the second round.

== Second round ==
Team 1	Agg.	Team 2	1st leg	2nd leg
DR Congo	3–2	Namibia	2–2	1–0
Tunisia	0–3	Ghana	0–2	0–1
South Africa	7–2	Zambia	1–2	6–0
Zimbabwe	1–10	Nigeria	1–4	0–6

DR Congo	2−2	Namibia

Namibia	0−1	DR Congo

DR Congo won 3−2 on aggregate and advanced to the third round.

Tunisia	0−2	Ghana

Ghana	1−0	Tunisia

Ghana won 3−0 on aggregate and advanced to the third round.

South Africa	1−2	Zambia

Zambia	0−6	South Africa

South Africa won 7−2 on aggregate and advanced to the third round.

20 January 2010

Zimbabwe	1−4	Nigeria

Nigeria	6−0	Zimbabwe

Nigeria won 10−1 on aggregate and advanced to the third round.

== Third round ==
The winners of the two Third Round matches will qualify directly to the 2010 FIFA U-20 Women's World Cup held in Germany.

Team 1	Agg.	Team 2	1st leg	2nd leg
DR Congo	0–5	Ghana	0–2	0–3
South Africa	3–12	Nigeria	3–5	0–7

12 February 2010

DR Congo	0−2	Ghana
		Florence Dadson; Fauzia Ibrahim

26 February 2010

Ghana	3−0	DR Congo
Fauzia Ibrahim; Elizabeth Cudjoe; Florence Dadson

Ghana won 5−0 on aggregate and qualified for 2010 FIFA U20 W-WC.

26 February 2010

South Africa	3−5	Nigeria

27 March 2010

Nigeria	7−0	South Africa

Nigeria won 12−3 on aggregate and qualified for 2010 FIFA U20 W-WC.

== Qualified teams for FIFA U-20 Women's World Cup ==
The following two teams from CAF qualified for the FIFA U-20 Women's World Cup.

Team	Qualified on	Previous appearances in tournament
Ghana	26 February 2010	0
Nigeria	27 March 2010	4 (2002, 2004, 2006, 2008)
