= Cameroon women's national under-20 football team =

Women's national under-20 football team representing Cameroon

Cameroon Women's U-20s
- Nickname: Les Lionnes Indomptables (The Indomitable Lionesses)
- Association: Cameroonian Football Federation
- Confederation: CAF (Africa)
- Sub-confederation: UNIFFAC (Central Africa)
- FIFA code: CMR
First colours	Second colours

African U-20 World Cup qualification
- Appearances: 7 (first in 2006)
- Best result: Qualified for World Cup (2024)

FIFA U-20 Women's World Cup
- Appearances: 1 (first in 2024)
- Best result: Round of 16 (2024)

The Cameroon women's national under-20 football team represents Cameroon in international youth women's football competitions.

The team won the silver medal in the women's tournament at the 2019 African Games held in Rabat, Morocco.

== Fixtures and results ==
Legend

Win Draw Lose Fixture

=== 2026 ===
7 February 2026 World Cup Q	Cameroon	5–0	Botswana	Yaoundé
16:00 UTC+1	Effa 18' (pen.); Nimpa 30'; Mekoua 50'; Tsimi 68' (pen.); Ngo Bilong 74'	Report		Stadium: Olembe Stadium; Referee: Yacine Samassa (Mauritania)

13 February 2026 World Cup Q	Botswana	1–0	Cameroon	Francistown
15:00 UTC+2	Hangara 77'	Report		Stadium: Obed Itani Chilume Stadium; Referee: Yemisi Akintoye (Nigeria)

== Competitive record ==
=== FIFA U-20 Women's World Cup record ===
FIFA U-20 Women's World Cup
Year	Result	Matches	Wins	Draws*	Losses	GF	GA
(Canada) 2002	Did not qualify						
(Thailand) 2004	Did not qualify						
(Russia) 2006	Did not qualify						
(Chile) 2008	Did not qualify						
(Germany) 2010	Did not qualify						
(Japan) 2012	Did not qualify						
(Canada) 2014	Did not qualify						
(Papua New Guinea) 2016	Did not qualify						
(France) 2018	Did not qualify						
(Costa Rica) 2022	Did not qualify						
(Colombia) 2024	Round of 16	4	1	1	2	5	6
(Poland) 2026	Did not qualify						
Total	1/12	4	1	1	2	5	6

=== African U-20 Women's World Cup qualification ===
African U-20 Women's World Cup qualification
Appearances: 7
Year	Round	Pld	W	D	L	GF	GA
2002	Did not enter						
2004	Did not enter						
2006	Round 2	0	0	0	0	-	-
2008	Round 1	2	0	0	2	0	4
2010	Did not enter						
2012	Round 1	2	0	1	1	2	3
2014	Did not enter						
2015	Round 1	2	0	1	1	1	2
2018	Round 3	2	0	1	1	1	4
2020	Cancelled						
2022	Round 3	4	2	1	1	9	3
2024	Qualified for World Cup	6	5	1	0	17	6
2026	To be determined						
Total	7/12	18	7	5	6	30	22

== Head-to-head record ==
The following table shows Cameroon's head-to-head record in the FIFA U-20 Women's World Cup.

Opponent	Pld	W	D	L	GF	GA	GD	Win %
Australia	1	1	0	0	2	0	+2	100.00
Brazil	1	0	0	1	1	3	−2	0.00
Colombia	1	0	0	1	0	1	−1	0.00
Mexico	1	0	1	0	2	2	+0	0.00
Total	4	1	1	2	5	6	−1	25.00

== See also ==
- Cameroon women's national football team
- Cameroon women's national under-17 football team
