= Enekia Lunyamila =

Tanzanian footballer (born 2002)

Enekia Kasonga
Personal information
- Full name: Enekia Kasonga Lunyamila
- Date of birth: 20 April 2002 (age 24)
- Place of birth: Kigoma, Tanzania
- Position: Striker

Team information
- Current team: Querétaro
- Number: 17

Youth career
- Alliance FC

Senior career*
Years	Team	Apps	(Gls)
2016	Alliance FC	23	(37)
2018	Ruvuma Queens	34	(27)
2021	AUSF Assa-Zag	41	(49)
2023	Kryvbas Kryvyi Rih		
2023–2024	Eastern Flames	14	(7)
2024–2025	Mazatlán	29	(8)
2025–2026	Juárez	11	(1)
2026–	Querétaro	0	(0)

International career
2019–2020	Tanzania U20		
2018–	Tanzania	28	(20)
- * Club domestic league appearances and goals

Enekia Kasonga Lunyamila (born 20 April 2002) is a Tanzanian professional footballer who plays as a striker for Liga MX Femenil club FC Juárez and the Tanzania women's national team.

== International career ==
Kasonga played for the Tanzania national U-20 team in 2019 and 2020. She played a key role and scored 4 goals en route to the team winning the 2019 COSAFA U-20 Women's Championship. At the end of the competition she was adjudged player of the tournament.

Kasonga capped for the Tanzania women's national team during the 2020 COSAFA Women's Championship and 2021 COSAFA Women's Championship. She scored the lone goal, the winning goal in the 2021 final against Malawi to help Tanzania win the tournament for the first time in its history.

== Honours ==
Tanzania

- COSAFA U-20 Women's Championship: 2019
- COSAFA Women's Championship: 2021

Individual

- COSAFA U-20 Women's Championship Player of the Tournament: 2019
- Best player of Morocco women's professional first league 2021/22
