= Memory Phiri =

Zambian footballer (born 1998)

Personal information
- Date of birth: 12 May 1998 (age 28)
- Place of birth: Chilubi, Zambia
- Height: 1.65 m (5 ft 5 in)
- Position: Attacking midfielder

College career
Years	Team	Apps	(Gls)
2015–2016	Northern Oklahoma Mavericks	39	(31)
2017–2018	Southwestern Oklahoma State Bulldogs		

Senior career*
Years	Team	Apps	(Gls)
2013–2014	Green Buffaloes Women's Football Club	30	(42)

International career^{‡}
2013–2014	Zambia U17	7	(5)
2015–	Zambia U20	2	(2)
- * Club domestic league appearances and goals as of 23 November 2017 ‡ National team caps and goals as of 23 November 2017

Memory Phiri (born 12 May 1998) is a Zambian association football forward who plays for Southwestern Oklahoma State University in the United States of America.

== Club career ==
After playing for the high school in Lusaka, she joined the Green Buffaloes Women’s Football Team from 2013 to 2014 where she scored 42 goals in 30 appearances. In 2015, she was offered a scholarship to study medicine at Northern Oklahoma College in the United States of America. She played for the college from 2015 to 2016 where she scored 31 goals in 31 appearances.

Southwest Oklahoma State University (SWOSU) named Memory Phiri the Great American Conference Offensive Player of the Week (i.e. week two of October 2018) making it twice in 2018 season.

== International ==
She was invited for the trials for Zambia's inaugural women's Under-17 side and was later selected for a tournament in Sweden where she scored a bicycle kick. From that impressive performance, she received a call-up for the Under-17 World Cup qualifiers. She represented Zambia at the 2014 FIFA U-17 Women's World Cup in Costa Rica, turning out in all three games as Zambia won one game on its tournament debut.
