= 2002 African U-19 Women's Championship =

Tournament details
- Dates: 3 August 2001–19 April 2002
- Teams: 13 (from 1 confederation)

Final positions
- Champions: Nigeria (1st title)
- Runners-up: South Africa
- Third place: Central African Republic; Morocco

Tournament statistics
- Matches played: 11
- Goals scored: 43 (3.91 per match)

The 2002 African U-19 Women's Championship was the first edition of the African under-19 women's football championship. The winners of the tournament Nigeria have qualified to the 2002 FIFA U-20 Women's World Cup.

== Bracket ==
Three teams received a bye in the first round.

Round of 16
São Tomé and Príncipe	0	1	1
Mali	6	4	10
Gambia
Morocco (w/o)
Equatorial Guinea	0	0	0
Central African Republic	1	2	3
Botswana
Zimbabwe (w/o)
Malawi
Zambia (w/o)

Quarter-finals
Mali	0	0	0
Nigeria	6	4	10
Niger
Morocco (w/o)
Central African Republic (w/o)
Zimbabwe
South Africa	1	3	4
Zambia	0	2	2

Semi-finals
Nigeria (w/o)
Morocco
Central African Republic	0	0	0
South Africa (w/o) (Note: The 2nd leg on Feb 10 was not played after South African immigration officials refused the Central African team entry. South Africa were originally disqualified, but on appeal the disqualification was overturned, and the 2nd leg was rescheduled for March 22–24, but Central Africa withdrew: CAF awarded South Africa a 3–0 victory for the 2nd leg.)	2	3	5

Final
Nigeria	6	3	9
South Africa	0	2	2

== First round ==
First leg played between 3 and 5 August 2001. Second leg between 17 and 19 August 2001.

Team 1	Agg.	Team 2	1st leg	2nd leg
Equatorial Guinea	0–3	Central African Republic	0–1	0–2
São Tomé and Príncipe	1–10	Mali	0–6	1–4
Malawi	w/o	Zambia	—	—
Botswana	w/o	Zimbabwe	—	—
Gambia	w/o	Morocco	—	—
Niger	bye			
Nigeria	bye			
South Africa	bye			

... August 2001

Equatorial Guinea	0−1	Central African Republic

... August 2001

Central African Republic	2−0	Equatorial Guinea

Central African Republic won 3−0 on aggregate.

... August 2001

São Tomé and Príncipe	0−6	Mali

... August 2001

Mali	4−1	São Tomé and Príncipe

Mali won 10−1 on aggregate.

Malawi	Cancelled	Zambia

Zambia won on walkover after Malawi did not appear for the first leg.

Botswana	Cancelled	Zimbabwe

Zimbabwe won on walkover after Botswana did not appear for the first leg.

Gambia	Cancelled	Morocco

Morocco won on walkover after Gambia did not appear for the first leg.

== Quarterfinals ==
First leg played between 26 and 28 October 2001. Second leg between 9 and 11 November 2001.

Team 1	Agg.	Team 2	1st leg	2nd leg
Zambia	2–4	South Africa	0–1	2–3
Mali	0–10	Nigeria	0–6	0–4
Central African Republic	w/o	Zimbabwe	—	—
Niger	w/o	Morocco	—	—

... October 2001

Zambia	0−1	South Africa

... November 2001

South Africa	3−2	Zambia

Zambia won 4−2 on aggregate.

... October 2001

Mali	0−6	Nigeria

... November 2001

Nigeria	4−0	Mali

Nigeria won 10−0 on aggregate.

Central African Republic	Cancelled	Zimbabwe

Central African Republic won on walkover after Zimbabwe did not appear for the first leg.

Niger	Cancelled	Morocco

Morocco won on walkover after Niger did not appear for the first leg.

== Semifinals ==
First leg played between 25 and 27 January 2002. Second leg between 22 and 24 March 2002.

Team 1	Agg.	Team 2	1st leg	2nd leg
Central African Republic	0–5	South Africa	0–2	0–3
Nigeria	w/o	Morocco	—	—

... January 2002

Central African Republic	0−2	South Africa

... March 2002

South Africa	3–0 Awarded	Central African Republic

South Africa won 5–0 on aggregate; Central African Republic withdrew prior to the second leg.

Nigeria	Cancelled	Morocco

Nigeria won on walkover after Morocco did not appear for the first leg.

== Final ==
First leg played between 29 and 31 March 2002. Second leg between 19 April 2002.

Team 1	Agg.	Team 2	1st leg	2nd leg
Nigeria	9–2	South Africa	6–0	3–2

... March 2002

Nigeria	6−0	South Africa

19 April 2002

South Africa	2−3	Nigeria

Nigeria won 9−2 on aggregate.

== Qualified teams for FIFA U-20 Women's World Cup ==
The following team from CAF qualified for the 2002 FIFA U-20 Women's World Cup.

Team	Qualified on	Previous appearances in FIFA U-20 Women's World Cup^{1}
Nigeria	19 April 2002	0 (debut)

^{1} Bold indicates champions for that year. Italic indicates hosts for that year.
