= Adrielle Mibe =

South Africa soccer player (born 2007)

Personal information
- Date of birth: 26 January 2007 (age 19)
- Position: Midfielder

Team information
- Current team: Arizona State Sun Devils
- Number: 10

College career
Years	Team	Apps	(Gls)
2022–2025	University of Johannesburg		
2025–	Arizona State Sun Devils	1	(0)

International career
2023	South Africa U17		
2024	South Africa U20		(5)
2025–	South Africa	3	(1)

Adrielle Mibe (26 January 2007) is a South African soccer player who plays as a forward for Arizona State Sun Devils and the South Africa women's national team.

== College career ==
=== University of Johannesburg ===
Mibe joined the University of Johannesburg at age 15 where she initially played for the Sasol team. She won the 2022, 2023, and 2025 Gauteng ENGEN Knockout Challenge, the team were runners-up in 2024 when they lost to Mamelodi Sundowns Ladies Academy. They also won the ENGEN Champ of Champs in 2022 and defended their title in 2023.

Mibe was voted midfielder and player of the tournament at the 2025 Gauteng ENGEN Knockout Challenge.

=== Arizona State University ===
In July 2025 she joined Arizona State Sun Devils.

== International career ==
Mibe played for the under-17 team at the 2022 COSAFA U-17 Women's Championship where she scored 5 goals to help the team to their maiden COSAFA title.

In 2024, she played for the under-20 team at the 2024 COSAFA U-20 Women's Championship where they were runners-ups. She was joint top scorer with 4 goals.

She made her senior team debut in 2025 scoring her maiden goal against Botswana on 28 May 2025.

=== International goals ===
No.	Date	Venue	Opponent	Score	Result	Competition
1.	28 May 2025	Lucas Moripe Stadium, Pretoria, South Africa	Botswana	1–0	3–2	Three-nations Challenge

== Honours ==
South Africa

- COSAFA U-20 Women's Championship: runners-up: 2024
- COSAFA U-17 Women's Championship: 2022

University of Johannesburg

- ENGEN Champ of Champs: 2022, 2023
- Gauteng ENGEN Knockout Challenge: 2022, 2023, 2025, runners-up: 2024

Individual

- 2024 COSAFA U-20 Women's Championship: Top scorer (4 goals)
- 2025 Gauteng ENGEN Knockout Challenge: Player of the Tournament
- 2025 Gauteng ENGEN Knockout Challenge: Midfielder of the Tournament
