= Mafia Nyame =

Ghanaian footballer

Personal information
- Date of birth: 7 October 2004 (age 22)
- Place of birth: Ghana
- Height: 1.64 m (5 ft 5 in)
- Position: Forward

Team information
- Current team: AS FAR
- Number: 18

International career
Years	Team	Apps	(Gls)
- Ghana U17
- Ghana U20

Mafia Nyame (born 7 October 2004) is a Ghanaian professional footballer who plays as a forward for Moroccan Women's Championship club AS FAR.

== Club football ==
Nyame played for Faith Ladies FC from 2021 to 2023 and currently plays for FAR Rabat.

== International career ==
She played for the Ghana under-20 team as an attacker at the FIFA Under-20 Women's World Cup.
