= Ghana women's national under-20 association football team =

National soccer team

Ghana U-20
- Nickname: Black Princesses
- Association: Ghana Football Association
- Confederation: CAF (Africa)
- Sub-confederation: WAFU (West Africa)
- Head coach: Charles Sampson
- Captain: Stella Nyamekye
- FIFA code: GHA
First colours	Second colours

African World Cup qualification
- Appearances: 9 (first in 2006)
- Best result: Qualified to the World Cup (2010, 2012, 2014, 2015, 2018, 2022, 2024)

FIFA U-20 Women's World Cup
- Appearances: 8 (first in 2010)
- Best result: Group stage (2010, 2012, 2014, 2016, 2018, 2022, 2024, 2026)

Ghana women's national under-20 association football team (also known as the Black Princesses) represents Ghana in international youth football competitions.

== Fixtures and results ==
Legend

Win Draw Lose Fixture

=== 2026 ===
8 February World Cup Q	Ghana	2–2	South Africa	Accra, Ghana
15:00	A. Yeboah 33'; Owusu Ansah 52'		October 47'; Khoza 60'	Stadium: Accra Sports Stadium

14 February World Cup Q	South Africa	0–1	Ghana	Mbombela, South Africa
15:00			Mensah 63'	Stadium: Mbombela Stadium

== Head coaches ==
- (Ghana) Kuuku Dadzie (November 2009 – October 2011)
- (Ghana) Robert Sackey (2011–2014)
- (Ghana) Yusif Basigi ( September 2017–2019)
- (Ghana) Yusif Basigi (November 2020 – May 2021)
- (Ghana) Yusif Basigi (March 2023 –December 2024)
- (Ghana) Charles Sampson (December 2024 – )

== Competitive record ==
=== FIFA U-20 Women's World Cup ===
Year	Result	Pld	W	D*	L	GF	GA
(Canada) 2002	Did not enter						
(Thailand) 2004	Did not enter						
(Russia) 2006	Did not qualify						
(Chile) 2008	Did not qualify						
(Germany) 2010	Group stage	3	1	1	1	5	5
(Japan) 2012	Group stage	3	0	0	3	0	6
(Canada) 2014	Group stage	3	2	0	1	3	4
(Papua New Guinea) 2016	Group stage	3	0	2	1	3	4
(France) 2018	Group stage	3	1	0	2	2	8
(Costa Rica) 2022	Group stage	3	0	0	3	1	9
(Colombia) 2024	Group stage	3	1	0	2	5	7
(Poland) 2026	Group stage	3	1	0	2	3	8
Total:8/12	Group stage	24	6	3	15	22	51

=== African U-20 Women's World Cup Qualification record ===
African U-20 Women's World Cup qualification
Appearances: 9
Year	Round	Position	Pld	W	D	L	GF	GA
2002	Did not enter							
2004	Did not enter							
2006	Round 3	4th	4	1	0	1	0	4
2008	Round 3	4th	6	3	0	3	19	9
2010	Qualified for World Cup	1st	4	4	0	0	8	0
2012	Qualified for World Cup	1st	6	6	0	0	22	2
2014	Qualified for World Cup	1st	6	5	0	1	1	1
2015	Qualified for World Cup	1st	6	5	1	0	17	2
2018	Qualified for World Cup	1st	6	5	1	0	23	2
2022	Qualified for World Cup	1st	8	7	1	0	13	2
2024	Qualified for World Cup	1st	6	6	0	0	21	2
Total	9/11	7 Titles	52	45	3	4	124	24

=== Football at the African Games record ===
Football at the African Games
Appearances: 1
Year	Round	Position	Pld	W	D	L	GF	GA
(Morocco) 2019	Did not enter							
(Ghana) 2023	Gold medalist	1st	5	4	1	0	4	5
Total	1/2	1 Title	5	4	1	0	4	5

=== WAFU Zone B U-20 Women's Cup ===
WAFU Zone B U20 Women's Cup
Appearances: 2
Year	Round	Position	Pld	W	D	L	GF	GA
(Ghana) 2023	Champions	1st	4	3	1	0	10	3
(Benin) 2025	Runner-up	2nd	4	2	0	2	4	5
Total	2/2	1 Title	8	5	1	2	14	8

== See also ==
- Ghana women's national football team
- Ghana women's national under-17 football team
