= South Africa women's national under-20 soccer team =

South Africa under-20
- Nickname: Basetsana
- Association: South African Football Association
- Confederation: CAF (Africa)
- Sub-confederation: COSAFA
- Head coach: Maude Khumalo
- Captain: Casey Gordon
- Top scorer: Linda Motlhalo (9 goals)
- Home stadium: FNB Stadium
- FIFA code: RSA
First colours	Second colours

First international
- Zambia 0–1 South Africa (Lusaka, Zambia; 26 October 2001)

Biggest win
- South Africa 8–1 Botswana (Johannesburg, South Africa; 12 July 2015)

Biggest defeat
- Nigeria 7–0 South Africa (Abuja, Nigeria; 27 March 2010)

African U-20 Women's World Cup qualification
- Appearances: 12 (first in 2002)
- Best result: (silver) Runners-Up (2002), (2004), (2008), (2010), (2014), (2015), (2018)

COSAFA U-20 Women's Championship
- Appearances: 3 (first in 2019)
- Best result: (silver) Runners-Up (2024), (2025)
Medal record
African U-20 Women's World Cup qualification
Second place	2002
Second place	2004
COSAFA U-20 Women's Championship
Second place	2025 Namibia
Second place	2024 South Africa
Third place	2019 South Africa

The South Africa women's national under-20 soccer team, nicknamed Basetsana, represents South Africa in international under-17 women's soccer. It is controlled by the South African Football Association, the governing body for football in South Africa. The team's main objective is to qualify and play at the FIFA U-20 Women's World Cup and develop players for the main national team Banyana Banyana.

== History ==
The South Africa women's national under-19 team were runners up twice for the African U-19 Women's Championship in 2002 and 2004.

The team competed in the women's tournament at the 2019 African Games held in Rabat, Morocco.

They won the AUSC Region 5 Games title in 2016 and defended it in 2018.

=== COSAFA Women's Under-20 Championship ===
In 2019, they finished in third place at the inaugural COSAFA U-20 Women's Championship.

In 2024 and 2025, they finished as runners-up to Zambia.

== Results and fixtures ==
The following is a list of match results in the last 12 months, as well as any future matches that have been scheduled.

Legend

Win Draw Loss Fixture

=== 2026 ===
8 February World Cup Q	Ghana	2–2	South Africa	Accra, Ghana
15:00	A. Yeboah 33'; Owusu Ansah 52'		October 47'; Khoza 60'	Stadium: Accra Sports Stadium

14 February World Cup Q	South Africa	0–1	Ghana	Mbombela, South Africa
15:00			Mensah 63'	Stadium: Mbombela Stadium

== Current squad ==
The following 20 players were selected for the 2024 COSAFA U-20 Women's Championship held in South Africa between 19 November – 24 November 2024:

No.	Pos.	Player	Date of birth (age)	Club
1	GK	Casey Gordon		(South African Football Association) JVW F.C.
2	GK	Kgomotso Mussimango		(South African Football Association) TS Galaxy Queens
3	DF	Cinderella Mibe		(South African Football Association) UJ Ladies
4	DF	Sikelelwa Mhlanga		(South African Football Association) City Lads
5	DF	Judy Baloyi		(South African Football Association) Sinthumule Kutama
5	DF	Asanda Mchuni		(South African Football Association) Dlala Ntombazana
5	DF	Samkelo Gwamanda		(South African Football Association) Dlala Ntombazana
6	DF	Alvina Nwansoh Enoh		(South African Football Association) UCT Ladies
7	DF	Lizette Kolisa		(South African Football Association) Rising Stars Ladies
8	MF	Julia Goncalves		(South African Football Association) JVW F.C.
9	MF	Amukelani Masonganyi		(South African Football Association) UJ Ladies
10	MF	One Neoentle Mfisa		(South African Football Association) UP-Tuks Ladies
11	MF	Andrielle Mibe		(South African Football Association) UJ Ladies
12	MF	Nobahle Mdelwa		(South African Football Association) Lindelani Ladies
13	MF	Mmabatho Mogale		(South African Football Association) JVW F.C.
14	MF	Lindelwa Mabuza		(South African Football Association) Mamelodi Sundowns
15	FW	Tanna Hollis		(South African Football Association) JVW F.C.
16	MF	Anele Douglas		(South African Football Association) Dlala Ntombazana
18	FW	Thato Mofolo		(South African Football Association) UJ Ladies
19	FW	Gugu Mabitsela		(South African Football Association) Mamelodi Sundowns

=== Top goal scorers ===
Active players in bold, statistics correct as of September 2025.

Rank	Player	Goals
1	Linda Motlhalo	**9**
2	Gabriela Salgado	8
3	**Lindelwa Mabuza**	5
3	Adrielle Mibe	5
4	Mosili Makhoali	4
5	Shakeerah Jacobs	4

== Honours ==
- African U-19 Women's Championship: Runners up: 2002, 2004
- COSAFA U-20 Women's Championship: Runners-Up: 2024, 2025, Third: 2019
- AUSC Region 5 Games: 2016, 2018

== Competitive record ==
=== COSAFA U-20 Women's Championship ===
COSAFA U-20 Women's Championship record
Year	Round	Pld	W	D*	L	GS	GA	GD
(South Africa) 2019	Third Place	5	3	1	1	8	4	+4
(South Africa) 2024	Runners-Up	4	3	0	1	10	3	+7
(Namibia) 2025	Runners-Up	5	3	0	2	9	7	+2
Total		14	9	1	4	27	14	

== See also ==
- South Africa women's national soccer team
- South Africa women's national under-17 soccer team
- South Africa women's national under-15 soccer team
