= Angola women's national under-20 football team =

Angola Under-20
- Nickname: Welwitschias
- Association: Angolan Football Federation
- Confederation: CAF (Africa)
- Sub-confederation: COSAFA (Southern Africa)
- FIFA code: ANG
| First colours | Second colours |

African U-20 World Cup qualification
- Appearances: 2 (first in 2022)
- Best result: Round 1 (2022, 2024)

FIFA U-20 Women's World Cup
- Appearances: None

The Angola women's national under-20 football team represents Angola in international youth women's football competitions.

The team competed at the 2022 African U-20 Women's World Cup Qualifying Tournament without qualifying for the 2022 FIFA U-20 Women's World Cup.

== Results and fixtures ==
The following is a list of match results in the last 12 months, as well as any future matches that have been scheduled.

Legend

Win Draw Loss Fixture

== Competitive record ==
=== FIFA U-20 Women's World Cup record ===
FIFA U-20 Women's World Cup
| Year | Result | Matches | Wins | Draws* | Losses | GF | GA |
|---|---|---|---|---|---|---|---|
| (Canada) 2002 | Did not qualify | | | | | | |
| (Thailand) 2004 | Did not qualify | | | | | | |
| (Russia) 2006 | Did not qualify | | | | | | |
| (Chile) 2008 | Did not qualify | | | | | | |
| (Germany) 2010 | Did not qualify | | | | | | |
| (Japan) 2012 | Did not qualify | | | | | | |
| (Canada) 2014 | Did not qualify | | | | | | |
| (Papua New Guinea) 2016 | Did not qualify | | | | | | |
| (France) 2018 | Did not qualify | | | | | | |
| (Costa Rica) 2022 | Did not qualify | | | | | | |
| (Colombia) 2024 | Did not qualify | | | | | | |
| (Poland) 2026 | To be determined | | | | | | |
| Total | 0/12 | 0 | 0 | 0 | 0 | 0 | 0 |

== See also ==
- Angola women's national football team
