= Eritrea women's national under-20 football team =

The Eritrea women's national under-20 football team represents Eritrea in international youth women's football competitions.

The team finished in 5th place in the first edition of the CECAFA Women's U-20 Championship.

== See also ==
- Eritrea women's national football team
