= Eswatini women's national under-20 football team =

Eswatini Under-20
- Nickname: Sitsebe Samhlekazi
- Association: Eswatini Football Association
- Confederation: CAF (Africa)
- Sub-confederation: COSAFA (Southern Africa)
- FIFA code: ESW
First colours	Second colours

African U-20 World Cup qualification
- Appearances: 2 (first in 2022)
- Best result: Round 3 (2024)

FIFA U-20 Women's World Cup
- Appearances: None

The Eswatini women's national under-20 football team represents Eswatini in international youth women's football competitions. Its primary role is the development of players in preparation for the senior women's national team. The team competes in a variety of competitions, including the biennial African U-20 Women's World Cup qualification, which is the top competitions for this age group.

== Results and fixtures ==
The following is a list of match results in the last 12 months, as well as any future matches that have been scheduled.

Legend

Win Draw Loss Fixture

== Competitive record ==
=== FIFA U-20 Women's World Cup record ===
FIFA U-20 Women's World Cup
Year	Result	Matches	Wins	Draws*	Losses	GF	GA
(Canada) 2002	Did not qualify						
(Thailand) 2004	Did not qualify						
(Russia) 2006	Did not qualify						
(Chile) 2008	Did not qualify						
(Germany) 2010	Did not qualify						
(Japan) 2012	Did not qualify						
(Canada) 2014	Did not qualify						
(Papua New Guinea) 2016	Did not qualify						
(France) 2018	Did not qualify						
(Costa Rica) 2022	Did not qualify						
(Colombia) 2024	Did not qualify						
(Poland) 2026	Did not qualify						
Total	0/12	0	0	0	0	0	0

== See also ==
- Eswatini women's national football team
- Eswatini women's national under-17 football team
