= Zambia women's national under-20 football team =

Zambia
- Nickname: Young Copper Queens
- Association: Football Association of Zambia
- Confederation: CAF
- Sub-confederation: COSAFA (South Africa)
- Head coach: Florence Mwila
- FIFA code: ZAM
First colours	Second colours	Third colours

First international
- Zambia 0–1 South Africa (Zambia; 28 October 2001)

Biggest win
- Lesotho 0–9 Zambia (Johannesburg, South Africa; 19 November 2024)

Biggest defeat
- Zambia 0–6 South Africa (Zambia; 2009)

African U-20 Women's World Cup qualification
- Appearances: 10 (first in 2002)
- Best result: Third round (2022)

COSAFA U-20 Women's Championship
- Appearances: 2 (first in 2019)
- Best result: (gold) Champions (2024)

Zambia women's national under-20 football team, the Young Copper Queens, represents the country in international U20 competitions. The team, originally a U19 national team until 2006, has competed in the African Women U-19 Championship qualifying competition and the African qualifying competitions for the FIFA U19/U20 World Cup. Because of local conditions related to the whole of women's football on the continent, the team faces challenges for improving their performance.

== Background ==
Zambia women's national under-20 football team is nicknamed the Young She-polopolo. The team's official kit colours include green shorts, a green jersey and green socks. Women's football was formally organised by the Football Association of Zambia in 1983. Since that time, Zambia has created a women's senior national team and an under-20 team. Women's football continues to be supported by the national federation who have budgeted money for the women's game and youth game. In 2009, there were 100 women's teams for players over 16, and 112 youth women's teams for players under 16.

Women's football in Africa as a whole faces problems that include limited access to education, poverty amongst women in the wider society, and fundamental inequality present in the society that occasionally allows for female specific human rights abuses. When quality football players are produced in Africa, often they leave the country to seek greater opportunities elsewhere, to the detriment of the local game. Funding also is a problem for the women's game in Africa, with most of the funding for women's football in the Africa coming from FIFA, not the local national football association.

== Performance ==
Zambia women's national under-20 football team has participated in qualification tournaments for several events including the U19/U20 World Cup and the African Women's Championships. Up until the 2006, the FIFA Women World Cup close to this age group was for U19, but for the 2006 World Cup, the age was changed to U20. Zambia has participated in the qualification process for this competition as both the FIFA Women U19 World Cup and FIFA Women U20 World Cup.

The team participated in the first edition of the African Women U-19 Championship held in 2002. Zambia earned a bye in the first round when Malawi withdrew from the competition. They made it to the quarterfinals, where they met South Africa women's national under-20 football team whom Zambia lost to twice with scores of 0–1 and 2–3. Zambia women's national under-20 football team participated in the 2006 African Women U-20 Championship. They played a home and away series in Round 1 against Mozambique women's national under-20 football team, losing the match in Kitwe 0–4. In the return match in Mozambique, they won 2–1. They participated in the FIFA CAF U-20 World Cup 2008 Qualifying. They played against Egypt in the opening round. In the first match in Lusaka on 12 January 2008, they tied 2–2. In the return match on 25 January 2008 in Ismailia, they against tied but with a score of 1–1.

Zambia participated in the 2010 Africa Cup qualifiers. As part of a home and away series in the competition against South Africa, Zambia lost the first match 0–6 in early January in South Africa. On 23 January 2010, they played their second match, a return game at home Zambia, with the side being skippered by Veronica Banda, Jane Mutambo in goal and with Wisdom Kaira was the team's coach 2010 also saw Zambia's U20 team compete in the FIFA U20 World Cup qualifying tournament for Africa. In the first round, Zambia women's national under-20 football team beat Kenya women's national under-20 football team at home 2–1. In the return leg in Kenya, Zambia lost 4–0 and did not advance. In 2012, Zambia again tried to qualify for the FIFA U20 World Cup in the African tournament. This time, the Zambian side was coached by Martha Kapombo. In the first round, Zambia lost to Kenya by an aggregate of 5–2 from the two matches, one home and away for both teams. Zambia lost the second match at Nyayo National Stadium in Nairobi by a score of 0–4. In a mid-February game, they had beaten Kenya 2–1 at Sunset Stadium in Lusaka. Kapombo said of the second game, "We were not prepared to lose to Kenya; actually we knew that we were going to beat them by four goals like they did to us. They changed most of the players who we played with in Zambia and that made it very hard for us in the midfield which failed to click." The Kenyan coach Florence Adhiambo said of the game ""We have come very far, we've been training hard and now we've seen what good training can do. We have worked hard to be here and the fans really played a very important role into this victory." The leg winner was scheduled to play Tunisia in the second round.
