= Malawi women's national under-20 football team =

The Malawi women's national under-20 football team represents Malawi in international youth women's football competitions.

The team competed at the 2022 African U-20 Women's World Cup Qualifying Tournament without qualifying for the 2022 FIFA U-20 Women's World Cup.

== See also ==
- Malawi women's national football team
