= Zimbabwe women's national under-20 football team =

Zimbabwe Under-20
- Nickname: The Mighty Warriors
- Association: Zimbabwe Football Association (ZIFA)
- Confederation: CAF (Africa)
- Sub-confederation: COSAFA (Southern Africa)
- Home stadium: National Sports Stadium
First colours	Second colours

African U-20 World Cup qualification
- Appearances: 5 (first in 2002)
- Best result: Round 2 (2010, 2012)

FIFA U-20 Women's World Cup
- Appearances: None

The Zimbabwe women's national under-20 football team represents Zimbabwe in international youth women's football competitions. Its primary role is the development of players in preparation for the senior women's national team. The team competes in a variety of competitions, including the biennial African U-20 Women's World Cup qualification, which is the top competitions for this age group.

== Competitive record ==
=== FIFA U-20 Women's World Cup record ===
FIFA U-20 Women's World Cup
Year	Result	Matches	Wins	Draws*	Losses	GF	GA
(Canada) 2002	Did not qualify						
(Thailand) 2004	Did not qualify						
(Russia) 2006	Did not qualify						
(Chile) 2008	Did not qualify						
(Germany) 2010	Did not qualify						
(Japan) 2012	Did not qualify						
(Canada) 2014	Did not qualify						
(Papua New Guinea) 2016	Did not qualify						
(France) 2018	Did not qualify						
(Costa Rica) 2022	Did not qualify						
(Colombia) 2024	Did not qualify						
(Poland) 2026	Did not qualify						
Total	0/12	0	0	0	0	0	0

== See also ==
- Zimbabwe women's national football team
- Zimbabwe women's national under-17 football team
