= Lesotho women's national under-20 football team =

Lesotho
- Nickname: Lilies
- Association: Lesotho Football Association
- Confederation: CAF (Africa)
- Sub-confederation: COSAFA (Southern Africa)
- FIFA code: LES
First colours	Second colours

The Lesotho women's national under-20 football team represents the country in international youth women's football competitions.

== Background and development ==
The early development of women’s football on the continent was limited during the colonial period, as colonial powers introduced not only the sport itself but also patriarchal attitudes toward women’s participation in athletics. These ideas often reinforced similar social norms that were already present within local cultures.The national team’s limited development on the broader international stage, a pattern seen across many African teams, has been attributed to several factors, including restricted access to education, widespread poverty affecting women, and deep-rooted social inequalities that in some cases contribute to gender-specific human rights abuses. When quality female football players are developed, they tend to leave for greater opportunities abroad. Continent wide, funding is also an issue, with most development money coming from FIFA, not the national football association. Future, success for women's football in Africa is dependent on improved facilities and access by women to these facilities. Attempting to commercialise the game and make it commercially viable is not the solution, as demonstrated by the current existence of many youth and women's football camps held throughout the continent. Nada Grkinic was FIFA's international development manager. In 2007, one of her goals was to work on improving women's football in Africa and included work specifically pertaining to Lesotho.

The national federation was created in 1932. They joined FIFA in 1964. Their kit includes blue, white and green shirts, white shorts, and blue and white socks.

Football is the third most popular sport in the country, behind netball and athletics. Inside Lesotho, football is used to develop women's self-esteem. In 2006, there were 5,200 registered female football players, of which 5,000 were junior players and 200 were senior players. The number of female players has been increasing. In 2000, there were 210 registered players. In 2001, there were 350 registered players. In 2002, there were 480 registered players. In 2003, there were 750 registered players. In 2004, there were 2,180 registered players. In 2005, there were 4,600 registered players. In 2006, there were 5,200 registered players. In 2006, there were 61 total football clubs in the country, with 54 being mixed gendered teams and 7 being all women teams. Rights to broadcast the 2011 Women's World Cup in the country were bought by the African Union of Broadcasting.

== Team ==
The under-19/20 team is nicknamed the Lilies. They did not play any games in 2002 or 2003. In 2004, they played 3 games. In 2005, they played 2 games. In 2006, they played 2 games. In 2006, there was a change in FIFA structures for national under-19 teams, where they age group for the team was pushed up to under-20. The team participated in the African Women U-20 World Cup 2008 Qualifying. They opened against Botswana in Maseru, tying 1-1. In the return match in Gaborone, they lost 1-3. They competed in the preliminary rounds of the 2010 CAF FIFA U20 World Cup. In the preliminary round, they lost to Kenya away 2-0. At home, they tied Kenya 2-2. They did not make it out of the preliminary round.
