= Mozambique women's national under-20 football team =

Mozambique Under-20
- Nickname: Os Mambas (The Mambas)
- Association: Federação Moçambicana de Futebol (FMF)
- Confederation: CAF (Africa)
- Sub-confederation: COSAFA (Southern Africa)
- Head coach: (Mozambique) Julia Fumo
- FIFA code: MOZ
First colours	Second colours

African U-20 World Cup qualification
- Appearances: 6 (first in 2006)
- Best result: Round 2 (2026)

FIFA U-20 World Cup
- Appearances: None

The Mozambique women's national under-20 football team represents Mozambique in international youth women's football competitions.

The team competed at the 2022 African U-20 Women's World Cup Qualifying Tournament without qualifying for the 2022 FIFA U-20 Women's World Cup.

== Results and fixtures ==
The following is a list of match results in the last 12 months, as well as any future matches that have been scheduled.

Legend

Win Draw Loss Fixture

== Competitive record ==
=== FIFA U-20 Women's World Cup record ===
FIFA U-20 Women's World Cup
Year	Result	Matches	Wins	Draws*	Losses	GF	GA
(Canada) 2002	Did not qualify						
(Thailand) 2004	Did not qualify						
(Russia) 2006	Did not qualify						
(Chile) 2008	Did not qualify						
(Germany) 2010	Did not qualify						
(Japan) 2012	Did not qualify						
(Canada) 2014	Did not qualify						
(Papua New Guinea) 2016	Did not qualify						
(France) 2018	Did not qualify						
(Costa Rica) 2022	Did not qualify						
(Colombia) 2024	Did not qualify						
(Poland) 2026	Did not qualify						
Total	1/12	0	0	0	0	0	0

== See also ==
- Mozambique women's national football team
