= Botswana women's national under-20 football team =

Botswana Under-20
- Nickname: The Mares
- Association: Botswana Football Association
- Confederation: CAF (Africa)
- Sub-confederation: COSAFA (Southern Africa)
- Head coach: (Botswana) Tapaphiwa Tracy Gaebolae
- Captain: Katlo Ditsile
First colours	Second colours

African U-20 World Cup qualification
- Appearances: 8 (first in 2008)
- Best result: Round 3 (2026)

FIFA U-20 Women's World Cup
- Appearances: None

The Botswana women's national under-20 football team represents Botswana in international youth women's football competitions.

The team competed at the 2022 African U-20 Women's World Cup Qualifying Tournament without qualifying for the 2022 FIFA U-20 Women's World Cup.

== Results and fixtures ==
The following is a list of match results in the last 12 months, as well as any future matches that have been scheduled.

Legend

Win Draw Loss Fixture

=== 2026 ===
7 February 2026 World Cup Q	Cameroon	5–0	Botswana	Yaoundé
16:00 UTC+1	Effa 18' (pen.); Nimpa 30'; Mekoua 50'; Tsimi 68' (pen.); Ngo Bilong 74'	Report		Stadium: Olembe Stadium; Referee: Yacine Samassa (Mauritania)

13 February 2026 World Cup Q	Botswana	1–0	Cameroon	Francistown
15:00 UTC+2	Hangara 77'	Report		Stadium: Obed Itani Chilume Stadium; Referee: Yemisi Akintoye (Nigeria)

== Players ==
The following 20 players were selected for the 2024 COSAFA U-20 Women's Championship.

No.	Pos.	Player	Date of birth (age)	Caps	Goals	Club
1	GK	Gosego Mokola	22 July 2006 (age 20)	2	0	(Botswana Football Association) Security Systems
2	DF	Patricia Lesetedi-Malaicha	28 August 2006 (age 20)	0	0	(Botswana Football Association) Wonder Girls
3	DF	Ivy Mankgatau	27 October 2006 (age 19)	4	0	(Botswana Football Association) Orapa All Stars
4	DF	Nafisa Ngaka	9 February 2005 (age 21)	4	0	(Botswana Football Association) Police XI
5	GK	Babuyanana Dube	23 May 2005 (age 21)	0	0	(Botswana Football Association) Francistown United
6	DF	Thando Boitshepo	23 June 2005 (age 21)	3	0	(Botswana Football Association) Francistown United
7	MF	Yaone Modise	9 December 2005 (age 20)	4	2	(Botswana Football Association) Gaborone United
8	DF	Lone Letlhare	6 October 2007 (age 19)	1	0	(Botswana Football Association) Mexican Girls
9	FW	Dimpho Sedirwa	8 May 2005 (age 21)	4	0	(Botswana Football Association) Orapa United
10	MF	Lebogang Dilelo	25 April 2007 (age 19)	4	0	(Botswana Football Association) Dunamis brothers & Sisters
11	MF	Botlhe Bagotsi	20 November 2007 (age 18)	4	0	(Botswana Football Association) Moshupa New Stars
12	DF	Neo Bulala	1 February 2005 (age 21)	4	0	(Botswana Football Association) Mexican Girls
13	MF	Koketso Molwantwa	12 September 2006 (age 20)	4	0	(Botswana Football Association) Double Action
14	MF	Gaolathe Mmereki	5 June 2005 (age 21)	3	0	(Botswana Football Association) Tsabotlhe
15	MF	Palesa Mokopakgosi	5 July 2006 (age 20)	3	0	(Botswana Football Association) Gaborone United
16	GK	Karabo Luka	1 April 2005 (age 21)	3	0	(Botswana Football Association) Makufa
17	MF	Kaone Mbongwe	5 February 2005 (age 21)	4	0	(Botswana Football Association) Francistown United
18	MF	Serati Modisenyane	26 August 2005 (age 21)	4	1	(Botswana Football Association) Double Action
19	MF	Boitshepho Mpone	10 September 2006 (age 20)	0	0	(Botswana Football Association) Gaborone United
20	MF	Olorato Kwete	25 April 2006 (age 20)	0	0	(Botswana Football Association) Granada wonderous

== Competitive record ==
=== FIFA U-20 Women's World Cup record ===
FIFA U-20 Women's World Cup
Year	Result	Matches	Wins	Draws*	Losses	GF	GA
(Canada) 2002	Did not qualify						
(Thailand) 2004	Did not qualify						
(Russia) 2006	Did not qualify						
(Chile) 2008	Did not qualify						
(Germany) 2010	Did not qualify						
(Japan) 2012	Did not qualify						
(Canada) 2014	Did not qualify						
(Papua New Guinea) 2016	Did not qualify						
(France) 2018	Did not qualify						
(Costa Rica) 2022	Did not qualify						
(Colombia) 2024	Did not qualify						
(Poland) 2026	Did not qualify						
Total	0/12	0	0	0	0	0	0

== See also ==
- Botswana women's national football team
- Botswana women's national under-17 football team
