= 2018 African U-20 Women's World Cup qualification =

2018 African U-20 Women's World Cup Qualifying Tournament
Tournament details
- Dates: 21 July 2017 – 28 January 2018
- Teams: 19 (from 1 confederation)

Tournament statistics
- Matches played: 24
- Goals scored: 105 (4.38 per match)
- Top scorer(s): (Ghana) Princella Adubea (Nigeria) Rasheedat Ajibade (10 goals each)

The 2018 African U-20 Women's World Cup Qualifying Tournament was the 9th edition of the African U-20 Women's World Cup Qualifying Tournament, the biennial international youth football competition organised by the Confederation of African Football (CAF) to determine which women's under-20 national teams from Africa qualify for the FIFA U-20 Women's World Cup.

Players born on or after 1 January 1998 are eligible to compete in the tournament. Two teams qualify from this tournament for the 2018 FIFA U-20 Women's World Cup in France as the CAF representatives.

== Teams ==
A total of 19 (out of 54) CAF member national teams entered the qualifying rounds. The draw was announced by the CAF on 15 June 2017.

| Bye to first round (13 teams) | Preliminary round entrants (6 teams) |
|---|---|
| Algeria; Cameroon; Ethiopia; **Ghana**; Guinea; Morocco; Namibia; **Nigeria**; Rwanda; Senegal; South Africa; Tanzania; Tunisia | Burundi; Botswana; Djibouti; Kenya; Libya; Sierra Leone |

Notes

- Teams in **bold** qualified for the World Cup.

Did not enter

- Angola
- Benin
- Burkina Faso
- Cape Verde
- Central African Republic
- Chad
- Comoros
- Congo
- DR Congo
- Egypt
- Eritrea
- Equatorial Guinea
- Gabon
- Gambia
- Guinea-Bissau
- Ivory Coast
- Lesotho
- Liberia
- Madagascar
- Malawi
- Mali
- Mauritania
- Mauritius
- Mozambique
- Niger
- São Tomé and Príncipe
- Seychelles
- Somalia
- South Sudan
- Sudan
- Eswatini
- Togo
- Uganda
- Zambia
- Zimbabwe

== Format ==
Qualification ties are played on a home-and-away two-legged basis. If the aggregate score is tied after the second leg, the away goals rule is applied, and if still tied, the penalty shoot-out (no extra time) is used to determine the winner.

== Schedule ==
The schedule of the qualifying rounds is as follows.

| Round | Leg | Date |
|---|---|---|
| Preliminary round | First leg | 21–23 July 2017 |
| Preliminary round | Second leg | 4–6 August 2017 |
| First round | First leg | 15–17 September 2017 |
| First round | Second leg | 29 September – 1 October 2017 |
| Second round | First leg | 3–5 November 2017 |
| Second round | Second leg | 17–19 November 2017 |
| Third round | First leg | 12–14 January 2018 |
| Third round | Second leg | 26–28 January 2018 |

== Bracket ==
The two winners of the third round qualify for the 2018 FIFA U-20 Women's World Cup.

Preliminary round
Burundi | 6 | 2 | 8
Djibouti | 0 | 1 | 1

First round
Burundi | — | — | w/o
Rwanda | — | —
South Africa | 5 | 4 | 9
Namibia | 0 | 0 | 0
Morocco | 2 | 1 | 3
Senegal | 0 | 2 | 2
Nigeria | 3 | 6 | 9
Tanzania | 0 | 0 | 0

Second round
Burundi | 2 | 0 | 2
South Africa | 0 | 5 | 5
Morocco | 1 | 1 | 2
Nigeria | 1 | 5 | 6

Third round
South Africa | 0 | 0 | 0
Nigeria | 2 | 6 | 8

Preliminary round
Libya | — | —
Sierra Leone | — | — | w/o
Botswana | 1 | —
Kenya | 7 | — | w/o

First round
Tunisia | — | —
Sierra Leone | — | — | w/o
Guinea | 0 | —
Cameroon | 9 | — | w/o
Algeria | 0 | 0 | 0
Ghana | 5 | 5 | 10
Ethiopia | 2 | 1 | 3
Kenya | 2 | 2 | 4

Second round
Sierra Leone | — | —
Cameroon | — | — | w/o
Ghana | 5 | 5 | 10
Kenya | 0 | 1 | 1

Third round
Cameroon | 1 | 0 | 1
Ghana | 1 | 3 | 4

== Preliminary round ==
| Team 1 | Agg. | Team 2 | 1st leg | 2nd leg |
|---|---|---|---|---|
| Burundi | 8–1 | Djibouti | 6–0 | 2–1 |
| Libya | w/o | Sierra Leone | — | — |
| Botswana | w/o | Kenya | 1–7 | — |

22 July 2017
15:00 UTC+2

| Burundi | 6–0 | Djibouti |
|---|---|---|
| Niyonkuru 9'; Nahimana 12', 57', 62'; Irankunda 73'; Djafari 90+3' | Report |

Prince Louis Rwagasore Stadium, Bujumbura
Referee: Florentina Zablon Chief (Tanzania)
5 August 2017
16:00 UTC+3

| Djibouti | 1–2 | Burundi |
|---|---|---|
| Arab 68' | Report | Kanyamuneza 19'; Nahimana 88' |

El Hadj Hassan Gouled Aptidon Stadium, Djibouti City
Referee: Agneta Itubo Napangor (Kenya)

Burundi won 8–1 on aggregate.

21 July 2017

| Libya | Cancelled | Sierra Leone |
|---|---|---|
| | Report |

Referee: Dorsaf Ganouati (Tunisia)
4 August 2017

| Sierra Leone | Cancelled | Libya |
|---|---|---|
| | Report |

Referee: Zomadre Sonia Kore (Ivory Coast)

Sierra Leone won on walkover after Libya withdrew.

21 July 2017
16:00 UTC+2

| Botswana | 1–7 | Kenya |
|---|---|---|
| Atlang 39' | Report | Amunyolet 11', 85'; Shilwatso 20'; Nekesa 60', 75'; Corazone 79'; Wacera 83' |

Lobatse Stadium, Lobatse
Referee: Rusina Kuda Majo (Zimbabwe)
5 August 2017
15:00 UTC+3

| Kenya | Cancelled | Botswana |
|---|---|---|
| | Report |

Kenyatta Stadium, Machakos
Referee: Anna Akoyi (Uganda)

Kenya won on walkover after Botswana withdrew prior to the second leg for financial reasons.

== First round ==
| Team 1 | Agg. | Team 2 | 1st leg | 2nd leg |
|---|---|---|---|---|
| Burundi | w/o | Rwanda | — | — |
| South Africa | 9–0 | Namibia | 5–0 | 4–0 |
| Morocco | 3–2 | Senegal | 2–0 | 1–2 |
| Nigeria | 9–0 | Tanzania | 3–0 | 6–0 |
| Tunisia | w/o | Sierra Leone | — | — |
| Guinea | w/o | Cameroon | 0–9 | — |
| Algeria | 0–10 | Ghana | 0–5 | 0–5 |
| Ethiopia | 3–4 | Kenya | 2–2 | 1–2 |

15 September 2017

| Burundi | Cancelled | Rwanda |
|---|---|---|
| | Report |

29 September 2017

| Rwanda | Cancelled | Burundi |
|---|---|---|
| | Report |

Burundi won on walkover after Rwanda withdrew.

17 September 2017
15:00 UTC+2

| South Africa | 5–0 | Namibia |
|---|---|---|
| Daweti 28'; Motlhalo 39', 63'; Gladile 68'; Salgado 77' | Report |

Dobsonville Stadium, Johannesburg
Referee: Nirinjanahary Raharijaona (Madagascar)
1 October 2017
16:00 UTC+2

| Namibia | 0–4 | South Africa |
|---|---|---|
| | Report | Salgado 22'; Motlhalo 34', 47'; Ndlovu 63' |

Sam Nujoma Stadium, Windhoek
Referee: Letticia Antonella Viana (Swaziland)

South Africa won 9–0 on aggregate.

16 September 2017
17:00 UTC+1

| Morocco | 2–0 | Senegal |
|---|---|---|
| Salmi 20'; Mssoudy 85' | Report |

Stade Boubker Ammar, Salé
Referee: Dorsaf Ganouati (Tunisia)
30 September 2017
17:00 UTC+0

| Senegal | 2–1 | Morocco |
|---|---|---|
| Cissokho 52'; Baldé 87' | Report | Hady 75' |

Stade Al Djigo, Dakar
Referee: Fabienne Yvette Yameogo (Burkina Faso)

Morocco won 3–2 on aggregate.

16 September 2017
16:00 UTC+1

| Nigeria | 3–0 | Tanzania |
|---|---|---|
| Tule 22'; Ajibade 57', 64' | Report |

Samuel Ogbemudia Stadium, Benin City
Referee: Vincentia Enyonam Amedome (Togo)
1 October 2017
16:00 UTC+3

| Tanzania | 0–6 | Nigeria |
|---|---|---|
| | Report | Ajibade 20', 27'; Efih 36'; Imo 39'; Ijamilusi 51'; Aku 78' |

Chamazi Stadium, Dar es Salaam
Referee: Batol Mahjob Ibrahim (Sudan)

Nigeria won 9–0 on aggregate.

15 September 2017

| Tunisia | Cancelled | Sierra Leone |
|---|---|---|
| | Report |

29 September 2017

| Sierra Leone | Cancelled | Tunisia |
|---|---|---|
| | Report |

Sierra Leone won on walkover after Tunisia withdrew.

16 September 2017
16:30 UTC+0

| Guinea | 0–9 | Cameroon |
|---|---|---|
| | Report | Moumazin 5'; Dabda 10'; Djoubi 26'; Ndzana 27'; Takounda 47'; Ngah 61'; Tsadjia 65', 70'; Metho 75' |

Stade du 28 Septembre, Conakry
Referee: Zomadre Sonia Kore (Ivory Coast)
30 September 2017
15:30 UTC+1

| Cameroon | Cancelled | Guinea |
|---|---|---|
| | Report |

Stade Ahmadou Ahidjo, Yaoundé
Referee: Bijou Mayinga Mbimba (DR Congo)

Cameroon won on walkover after Guinea withdrew prior to the second leg.

15 September 2017
19:00 UTC+1

| Algeria | 0–5 | Ghana |
|---|---|---|
| | Report | Asantewaa 25'; Owusu-Ansah 53'; Obeng 63'; Anokye 82', 90' |

Omar Hamadi Stadium, Algiers
Referee: Aurore Christelle Ligan (Benin)
1 October 2017
15:30 UTC+0

| Ghana | 5–0 | Algeria |
|---|---|---|
| Adubea 32'; Obeng 44'; Asuako 53'; Adjei 55'; Asantewaa 86' | Report |

Cape Coast Sports Stadium, Cape Coast
Referee: Salematou Bah (Guinea)

Ghana won 10–0 on aggregate.

17 September 2017
16:00 UTC+3

| Ethiopia | 2–2 | Kenya |
|---|---|---|
| Feleke 19'; Geremew 27' | Report | Corazone 86' (pen.); Khakasa 90' |

Hawassa International Stadium, Awasa
Referee: Salma Mukansanga (Rwanda)
30 September 2017
15:00 UTC+3

| Kenya | 2–1 | Ethiopia |
|---|---|---|
| Corazone 12'; Shikangwa 50' | Report | Feleke 44' (pen.) |

Kenyatta Stadium, Machakos
Referee: Anna Akoyi (Uganda)

Kenya won 4–3 on aggregate.

== Second round ==
| Team 1 | Agg. | Team 2 | 1st leg | 2nd leg |
|---|---|---|---|---|
| Burundi | 2–5 | South Africa | 2–0 | 0–5 |
| Morocco | 2–6 | Nigeria | 1–1 | 1–5 |
| Sierra Leone | w/o | Cameroon | — | — |
| Ghana | 10–1 | Kenya | 5–0 | 5–1 |

4 November 2017
15:00 UTC+2

| Burundi | 2–0 | South Africa |
|---|---|---|
| Uwimana 3'; Nahimana 83' | Report |

Prince Louis Rwagasore Stadium, Bujumbura
Referee: Agneta Itubo Napangor (Kenya)
18 November 2017
15:00 UTC+2

| South Africa | 5–0 | Burundi |
|---|---|---|
| Xesi 9'; Daweti 23'; Motlhalo 37', 40'; Salgado 75' | Report |

Dobsonville Stadium, Johannesburg
Referee: Tania Marisa Duarte (Angola)

South Africa won 5–2 on aggregate.

5 November 2017
15:30 UTC+0

| Morocco | 1–1 | Nigeria |
|---|---|---|
| Sedki 21' | Report | Ajibade 26' |

Stade Boubker Ammar, Salé
Referee: Joyce Obenewa Appiah (Ghana)
18 November 2017
16:00 UTC+1

| Nigeria | 5–1 | Morocco |
|---|---|---|
| Ajibade 5', 90'; Monday 13'; Reuben 76', 90+2' | Report | Tagnaout 34' |

Samuel Ogbemudia Stadium, Benin City
Referee: Aurore Christelle Ligan (Benin)

Nigeria won 6–2 on aggregate.

3 November 2017

| Sierra Leone | Cancelled | Cameroon |
|---|---|---|
| | Report |

17 November 2017

| Cameroon | Cancelled | Sierra Leone |
|---|---|---|
| | Report |

Cameroon won on walkover after Sierra Leone withdrew.

5 November 2017
15:30 UTC+0

| Ghana | 5–0 | Kenya |
|---|---|---|
| Obeng 27'; Adubea 33', 43', 55', 70' | Report |

Cape Coast Sports Stadium, Cape Coast
Referee: Folusho Ajayi (Nigeria)
19 November 2017
15:00 UTC+3

| Kenya | 1–5 | Ghana |
|---|---|---|
| Muema 90+3' | Report | Anokye 1'; Adubea 8', 49', 87'; Abambila 76' |

Kenyatta Stadium, Machakos
Referee: Suavis Iratunga (Burundi)

Ghana won 10–1 on aggregate.

== Third round ==
Winners qualify for 2018 FIFA U-20 Women's World Cup.

| Team 1 | Agg. | Team 2 | 1st leg | 2nd leg |
|---|---|---|---|---|
| South Africa | 0–8 | Nigeria | 0–2 | 0–6 |
| Cameroon | 1–4 | Ghana | 1–1 | 0–3 |

13 January 2018
15:00 UTC+2

| South Africa | 0–2 | Nigeria |
|---|---|---|
| | Report | Ajibade 30'; Imo 35' |

Peter Mokaba Stadium, Polokwane
Referee: Maria Rivet (Mauritius)
27 January 2018
16:00 UTC+1

| Nigeria | 6–0 | South Africa |
|---|---|---|
| Monday 5', 39'; Ajibade 21', 31'; Imo 27', 72' | Report |

Samuel Ogbemudia Stadium, Benin City
Referee: Gladys Lengwe (Zambia)

Nigeria won 8–0 on aggregate.

14 January 2018
15:30 UTC+1

| Cameroon | 1–1 | Ghana |
|---|---|---|
| Takounda 11' | Report | Adubea 52' |

Stade Ahmadou Ahidjo, Yaoundé
Referee: Chancelle Cynthia Imane Ngakossa (Congo)
27 January 2018
15:00 UTC+0

| Ghana | 3–0 | Cameroon |
|---|---|---|
| Abambila 14'; Adubea 39'; Owusu-Ansah 87' | Report |

Cape Coast Sports Stadium, Cape Coast
Referee: Aissata Diarra (Mali)

Ghana won 4–1 on aggregate.

== Qualified teams for FIFA U-20 Women's World Cup ==
The following two teams from CAF qualified for the 2018 FIFA U-20 Women's World Cup.

| Team | Qualified on | Previous appearances in FIFA U-20 Women's World Cup^{1} |
|---|---|---|
| Nigeria | 27 January 2018 | 8 (2002, 2004, 2006, 2008, 2010, 2012, 2014, 2016) |
| Ghana | 27 January 2018 | 4 (2010, 2012, 2014, 2016) |

^{1} Bold indicates champions for that year. Italic indicates hosts for that year.

== Goalscorers ==
10 goals

- (Ghana) Princella Adubea
- (Nigeria) Rasheedat Ajibade

6 goals

- (South Africa) Linda Motlhalo

5 goals

- (Burundi) Falonne Nahimana

4 goals

- (Nigeria) Anam Imo

3 goals

- (Ghana) Olivia Anokye
- (Ghana) Helena Obeng
- (Kenya) Vivian Corazone
- (Nigeria) Gift Monday
- (South Africa) Gabriela Salgado

2 goals

- (Cameroon) Alexandra Takounda
- (Cameroon) Dolores Tsadjia
- (Ethiopia) Mirkat Feleke
- (Ghana) Ernestina Abambila
- (Ghana) Grace Asantewaa
- (Ghana) Sandra Owusu-Ansah
- (Kenya) Martha Amunyolet
- (Kenya) Marjolen Nekesa
- (Nigeria) Charity Reuben
- (South Africa) Lelona Daweti

1 goal

- (Botswana) Leano Atlang
- (Burundi) Asha Djafari
- (Burundi) Charlotte Irankunda
- (Burundi) Erica Kanyamuneza
- (Burundi) Sandrine Niyonkuru
- (Burundi) Aniella Uwimana
- (Cameroon) Claudia Dabda
- (Cameroon) Soline Djoubi
- (Cameroon) Elodie Metho
- (Cameroon) Michele Moumazin
- (Cameroon) Colette Ndzana
- (Cameroon) Marie Ngah
- (Djibouti) Kafia Abdourahman Arab
- (Ethiopia) Alemnesh Geremew
- (Ghana) Vivian Adjei
- (Ghana) Philicity Asuako
- (Kenya) Maureen Khakasa
- (Kenya) Rachael Muema
- (Kenya) Jentrix Shikangwa
- (Kenya) Cynthia Shilwatso
- (Kenya) Diana Wacera
- (Morocco) Soumia Hady
- (Morocco) Sanaâ Mssoudy
- (Morocco) Rania Salmi
- (Morocco) Nouhaila Sedki
- (Morocco) Fatima Tagnaout
- (Nigeria) Cynthia Aku
- (Nigeria) Peace Efih
- (Nigeria) Folashade Ijamilusi
- (Nigeria) Lilian Tule
- (Senegal) Haby Baldé
- (Senegal) Maty Cissokho
- (South Africa) Lindokuhle Gladile
- (South Africa) Ntombifikile Ndlovu
- (South Africa) Khanya Xesi
