= 2026 WAFU A Zonal U-20 Women's Tournament =

Torneio Sub-20 Feminino da UFOA-A 2026

Tournament details
- Host country: Guinea-Bissau
- Dates: 1–20 May
- Teams: 5 (from 1 sub-confederation)
- Venue: 1 (in 1 host city)

Final positions
- Champions: Senegal (3rd title)
- Runners-up: Liberia
- Third place: Gambia
- Fourth place: Mali

Tournament statistics
- Matches played: 10
- Goals scored: 28 (2.8 per match)
- Top scorer: (Liberia) Makasian Saryon
- Best player: (Senegal) Sokhna Nogaye Pène
- Best goalkeeper: (Senegal) Awa Baldé
- Fair play award: Gambia

The 2026 WAFU A Zonal U-20 Women's Tournament (Portuguese: Torneio Sub-20 Feminino da UFOA-A 2026) was the third edition of the WAFU A Zonal U-20 Women's Tournament, the international women's youth football championship contested by the under-20 national teams of the member associations of WAFU/UFOA Zone A (West Africa). It is being hosted by Guinea-Bissau from 1 to 20 May 2026.

Senegal are the defending champions, having won record second title in 2024.

== Host selection ==
Guinea-Bissau were announced as the 2026 edition's hosts on 20 February 2026.

== Venue ==
Bissau	2026 WAFU A Zonal U-20 Women's Tournament is located in Guinea-Bissau
Estádio 24 de Setembro	2026 WAFU A Zonal U-20 Women's Tournament is located in Guinea-Bissau
Capacity: 20,000	2026 WAFU A Zonal U-20 Women's Tournament is located in Guinea-Bissau

== Participating teams ==
A total of 5 (out of 9) member associations entered teams for the competition, all of which had also taken part in the previous edition. Guinea, Mauritania, and Sierra Leone, who participated last time, did not enter this edition.

Team	Appearance(s)				Previous best performance (Note: Bold text indicates they hosted that edition.)
Team	Total	First	Last	Streak	Previous best performance
Gambia	2nd	2024		2	Group stage (2024)
Guinea-Bissau	3rd	2023	2024	3	Runners-up (2024)
Liberia	2nd	2024		2	Third place (2024)
Mali	2nd	2024		2	Group stage (2024)
Senegal	3rd	2023	2024	3	**Champions** (2023, **2024**)

Did not enter

- Cape Verde
- Guinea
- Mauritania
- Sierra Leone

== Squads ==
Players born between 1 January 2006 and 31 December 2010 were eligible to compete in the tournament.

Gambia; 1 Mary N. F. Gomez; 18 Diminga Mendy; 22 Awa Marena 2 Fatou Fatty; 3 Lucy Saidy; 4 Rebecca Mendy; 5 Veronica Sambou; 15 Mariama Sanneh; 16 Fatoumatta E. Manneh; 20 Ramou Joof; 23 Kaddy Sanyang; Ortance Manneh 6 Kumba Kassama (C); 8 Marie Pirrera; 11 Fatoumatta Tamba; 12 Kaddijatou Drammeh; Jarra Keita 7 Ellen Gomez; 9 Sarah Jarju; 10 Awa K. Darboe; 13 Teneng Marena; 17 Nyima Sanneh; Jojo Bojang Head coach: Joseph Jabang	Guinea-Bissau; Adji Saco; Helena Sam Umbende Noia Ié; Jusepa Mendes Pereira; Jaci Tine Gomes; Janua Marrete Gomes Quinta da Silva; Lindinha da Silva; Fatumata Zacarias Bá; Djenabú Camará; Binto Baió; Leide José Barros N Bitna; Juilda Cá; Maria Isabel Gomes Monteiro Djara Djata; Arlete Eusébio Gomes; Lidania Sancá; Sali Sanhá; Rosalina Cutobó Djombate; Lamarana Bari Head coach: Domingos Na Fatcha	Liberia; 1 Makula Konneh; 16 Grace Young 4 Angel Brown; 12 Hawa Diggs; 13 Princess Hill; 15 Serena Zarwolo; 18 Yatta Jaleibah; 20 Grace Kamara 2 Patience Konah; 6 Wonder Juery; 8 Louise Brown (C); 17 Bandu Yantay; 19 Rachel Carlor 3 Janies Dunbar; 5 Kennle Paasewe; 7 Dalphine Glao; 9 Yassah Gwaikolo; 10 Makasian Saryon; 11 Olive Nyumah; 14 Gloria Karyah Head coach: Famatta Dean	Mali; 1 Saran Samaké; 16 Maïmouna Sissoko; 20 Alima Cissé 3 Lalaïcha Traoré; 4 Aïssata Konaté; 5 Ramata Diakité; 6 Fatoumata Diarra; 13 Maïmouna Traoré; 17 Adama Diakité; 18 Talata Guindo 7 Aïssata Togo; 8 Kadidiatou Diabaté (C); 11 Aïssata Dembele; 14 Aminata Ouattara; 15 Siré A. Camara 10 Gna Diarra; 12 Adam Traoré; Nachata Coulibaly; Mah Traoré; Hawa Traoré Head coach: Oumar Guindo	Senegal; 1 Awa Baldé; Fatou Ndiaye Camara; Yakhara Diagne 2 Adama Siga Diouf; 3 Astou Diabang; 4 Khady Thiandoum; 5 Ndeye Haby Barro; 12 Aissatou Fall; Khady Niang; Fatma Nguer 10 Sokhna N. Pène (C); 13 Mariama Faty; Anta Thioune; Seynabou Mbengue; Aïssatou Sagna; Monique Sadio 7 Marie-Louise Sarr; 8 Aissatou Ndiaye; 18 Aissatou Chris Ba; Mame Diarra Diallo Head coach: Abitalib Fall

== Match officials ==
The following match officials were selected for the tournament.

Referees

- (Cape Verde) Ana Fernandes
- (The Gambia) Fatou Ngum
- (Guinea) Félicité Kourouma
- (Mali) Alima Diarra
- (Mauritania) Binta Ba
- (Senegal) Aminata Sylla
- (Sierra Leone) Aminata Fullah

Assistant referees

- (The Gambia) Abbie Ceesay
- (Guinea) M'mawa Kourouma
- (Guinea-Bissau) Cadidjatu Mancal
- (Mali) Kadidia Dicko
- (Mauritania) Houleye Diba
- (Sierra Leone) Agnes Gbla

== Standings ==
Pos	Team	Pld	W	D	L	GF	GA	GD	Pts
1st place, gold medalist(s)	Senegal (C)	4	4	0	0	11	0	+11	**12**
2nd place, silver medalist(s)	Liberia	4	2	1	1	7	4	+3	**7**
3rd place, bronze medalist(s)	Gambia	4	2	1	1	6	3	+3	**7**
4	Mali	4	1	0	3	3	12	−9	**3**
5	Guinea-Bissau (H)	4	0	0	4	1	9	−8	**0**

Source: UFOA/WAFU A
Rules for classification: 1) points; 2) head-to-head result; 3) goal difference; 4) goals scored; 5) fair play ranking.
(C) Champions; (H) Hosts

== Results ==
All times are local, GMT (UTC±0).

5 May 2026
16:00

Guinea-Bissau	0–2	Liberia
	Report	Saryon 3'; Nyumah 35'

Estádio 24 de Setembro, Bissau
Referee: Binta Ba (Mauritania)
5 May 2026
19:00

Senegal	2–0	Gambia
Faty 24'; Pène 75'	Report

Estádio 24 de Setembro, Bissau
Referee: Aminata Fullah (Sierra Leone)

8 May 2026
16:00

Liberia	0–2	Senegal
	Report	Pène 10' (pen.), 55'

Estádio 24 de Setembro, Bissau
Referee: Fatou Ngum (Gambia)
8 May 2026
19:00

Mali	2–1	Guinea-Bissau
Coulibaly 24'; A. Traoré 30'	Report	A. Gomes 7'

Estádio 24 de Setembro, Bissau
Referee: Aminata Sylla (Senegal)

11 May 2026
16:00

Gambia	2–0	Guinea-Bissau
Jarju 7', 59' (pen.)	Report

Estádio 24 de Setembro, Bissau
Referee: Alima Diarra (Mali)
11 May 2026
19:00

Mali	1–4	Liberia
Diabaté 81'	Report	Juery 21'; Saryon 33', 59', 76'

Estádio 24 de Setembro, Bissau
Referee: Félicité Kourouma (Guinea)

14 May 2026
16:00

Senegal	4–0	Mali
Diallo 23'; Pène 69' (pen.), 90' (pen.); Sarr 79'	Report

Estádio 24 de Setembro, Bissau
Referee: Aminata Fullah (Sierra Leone)
15 May 2026 (Note: The match was originally scheduled to be played on 14 May 2026 at 19:00, but was suspended after 20 minutes due to poor visibility. The match is scheduled to resume on 15 May 2026 at 16:00.)
16:00

Liberia	1–1	Gambia
Yantay 55'		E. Gomez 25'

Estádio 24 de Setembro, Bissau
Referee: Félicité Kourouma (Guinea)

17 May 2026
16:00

Gambia	3–0	Mali
Jarju 13', 90'; T. Marena 44'

Estádio 24 de Setembro, Bissau
17 May 2026
19:00

Guinea-Bissau	0–3	Senegal
		Mbengue 34'; Diouf 57'; Ndiaye 81'

Estádio 24 de Setembro, Bissau

== Goalscorers ==
There were 28 goals scored in 10 matches, for an average of 2.8 goals per match.

5 goals

- (Senegal) Sokhna Nogaye Pène

4 goals

- (The Gambia) Sarah Jarju
- (Liberia) Makasian Saryon

1 goal

- (The Gambia) Ellen Gomez
- (The Gambia) Teneng Marena
- (Guinea-Bissau) Arlete Eusébio Gomes
- (Liberia) Wonder Juery
- (Liberia) Olive Nyumah
- (Liberia) Bandu Yantay
- (Mali) Nachata Coulibaly
- (Mali) Kadidiatou Diabaté
- (Mali) Adam Traoré
- (Senegal) Mame Diarra Diallo
- (Senegal) Adama Siga Diouf
- (Senegal) Mariama Faty
- (Senegal) Seynabou Mbengue
- (Senegal) Aissatou Ndiaye
- (Senegal) Marie-Louise Sarr

Source: UFOA/WAFU A
