= 2024 WAFU Zone A U-20 Women's Cup =

Tournoi UFOA A U-20 Filles Senegal 2024

Tournament details
- Host country: Senegal
- City: Thiès
- Dates: 20–30 May
- Teams: 8 (from 1 sub-confederation)
- Venue: 1 (in 1 host city)

Final positions
- Champions: Senegal (2nd title)
- Runners-up: Guinea-Bissau
- Third place: Liberia
- Fourth place: Guinea

Tournament statistics
- Matches played: 15
- Goals scored: 47 (3.13 per match)
- Top scorer(s): (Liberia) Edwardline Jackson (6 goals)
- Best player: (Guinea) Fatoumata Yaya Samoura
- Best goalkeeper: (Senegal) Khady Faye
- Fair play award: Mali

The 2024 WAFU Zone A U-20 Women's Cup is the 2nd edition of the WAFU Zone A U20 Women's Cup, the international women's youth football championship contested by the under-20 national teams of the member associations of the West African Football Union Zone A, The tournament is set to take place in Senegal from 20 to 30 May 2024.

Senegal are the title holders, having won last year's inaugural edition.

== Teams ==
=== Participating teams ===
Eight WAFU zone A members associations confirmed participation in the Second edition in Senegal.

Team	App	Last	Best placement in the tournament
Gambia	1st	—N/a	debut
Guinea	2nd	2023	Runners-up (2023)
Guinea-Bissau	2nd	2023	Fourth place (2023)
Liberia	1st	—N/a	debut
Mali	1st	—N/a	debut
Mauritania	1st	—N/a	debut
Senegal	2nd	2023	Champions (2023)
Sierra Leone	2nd	2023	Third place (2023)

Did not enter

- Cape Verde

=== Draw ===
The final draw took place in Senegal on 15 May 2024.

== Venues ==
WAFU A has announced Thiès as the host city and confirmed the selection of the following two venues:

Thiès		2024 WAFU Zone A U-20 Women's Cup (Senegal)
Stade Lat-Dior	Stade Maniang Soumaré	2024 WAFU Zone A U-20 Women's Cup (Senegal)
Capacity: 8,712	Capacity: 8,000	2024 WAFU Zone A U-20 Women's Cup (Senegal)

== Squads ==
Players born between 1 January 2004 and 31 December 2008 are eligible to compete in the tournament.

== Match officials ==
WAFU A appointed referees and assistant referees for the tournament are yet to be announced.

Referees

- (The Gambia) Fatou Ngum
- (Guinea) Aïssatou Kanté
- (Liberia) Sylvina Garnett
- (Mauritania) Yacine Samassa
- (Senegal) Fatoumata Sall Touré
- (Senegal) Aida Sy
- (Senegal) Mariétou Fall
- (Sierra Leone) Humu Marah

Assistant referees

- (Cape Verde) Marisa Monteiro
- (The Gambia) Jainaba Manneh
- (Guinea) Mahawa Kourouma
- (Guinea-Bissau) Blossan Vaz Carlitos
- (Liberia) Hannah Moses
- (Mali) Mariam Coulibaly
- (Mali) Kadidia Dicko
- (Mauritania) Houleye Diba
- (Sierra Leone) Precious Amara

== Group Stage ==
times are local SNT (UTC).

=== Group A ===
Pos	Team	Pld	W	D	L	GF	GA	GD	Pts	Qualification
1	Senegal (H)	3	3	0	0	7	0	+7	9	Knockout stage
2	Guinea-Bissau	3	0	2	1	2	3	−1	2	Knockout stage
3	Gambia	3	0	2	1	2	4	−2	2	
4	Mali	3	0	2	1	2	6	−4	2	

Source: WAFU A
Rules for classification: Group stage tiebreakers
(H) Hosts
20 May 2024
16:00

Mali	1–1	Guinea-Bissau
D. Traoré 25'		C. Camará 45'

Stade Lat-Dior, Thiès
Referee: Aissatou Kanté (Guinea)
20 May 2024
19:00

Senegal	2–0	Gambia
Colley 39' (o.g.); A. Ndiaye 90+3' (pen.)	Report

Stade Lat-Dior, Thiès
Referee: Sylvina Garnett (Liberia)

22 May 2024
16:00

Mali	1–1	Gambia
Tienou 74'		Drammeh 3'

Stade Lat-Dior, Thiès
Referee: Humu Marah (Sierra Leone)
22 May 2024
19:00

Guinea-Bissau	0–1	Senegal
		Kandé 15'

Stade Lat-Dior, Thiès
Referee: Yacine Samassa (Mauritania)

24 May 2024
17:00

Gambia	1–1	Guinea-Bissau
Saidykhan 3'		Djata 36'

Stade Maniang Soumaré, Thiès
Referee: Sylvina Garnett (Liberia)
24 May 2024
17:00

Senegal	4–0	Mali
A. Ndiaye 24'; Kandé 62', 65'; Pène 78'

Stade Lat-Dior, Thiès
Referee: Aissatou Kanté (Guinea)

=== Group B ===
Pos	Team	Pld	W	D	L	GF	GA	GD	Pts	Qualification
1	Liberia	3	3	0	0	16	0	+16	9	Knockout stage
2	Guinea	3	2	0	1	10	2	+8	6	Knockout stage
3	Sierra Leone	3	1	0	2	2	9	−7	3	
4	Mauritania	3	0	0	3	0	17	−17	0	

Source: WAFU A
Rules for classification: Group stage tiebreakers
21 May 2024
16:00

Liberia	2–0	Guinea
Parsons 60'; Kowolo 77'	Report

Stade Lat-Dior, Thiès
Referee: Fatoumata Sall Touré (Senegal)
21 May 2024
19:00

Mauritania	0–2	Sierra Leone
		K. Kamara 42'; Brima 44'

Stade Lat-Dior, Thiès
Referee: Fatou Ngum (Gambia)

23 May 2024
16:00

Mauritania	0–8	Guinea
		Samoura 11', 18' (pen.), 80'; N. Diallo 51'; N. Camara 56'; F. Diallo 71', 73'; Cissé 83'

Stade Lat-Dior, Thiès
Referee: Aida Sy (Senegal)
23 May 2024
19:00

Sierra Leone	0–7	Liberia
F. Turay (red card) 40'		Brown 31', 70'; Jackson 37', 60', 86'; Quachie 74'; Tarpeh 90+1'

Stade Lat-Dior, Thiès
Referee: Mariétou Fall (Senegal)

25 May 2024
17:00

Guinea	2–0	Sierra Leone
Samoura 19' (pen.); Conté 58'

Stade Maniang Soumaré, Thiès
Referee: Fatoumata Sall Touré (Senegal)
25 May 2024
17:00

Liberia	7–0	Mauritania
Bogar 11'; Gibson 36'; Kawolo 41'; Jackson 52', 54', 83'; Quachie 89'

Stade Lat-Dior, Thiès
Referee: Fatou Ngum (Gambia)

== Knockout stage ==
Semi-finals
27 May – Stade Lat-Dior
Senegal	4
Guinea	0
27 May – Stade Lat-Dior
Liberia	1 (1)
Guinea-Bissau (p)	1 (3)

Final
29 May – Stade Lat-Dior
Senegal	3
Guinea-Bissau	0
Third Place
29 May – Stade Lat-Dior
Guinea	0 (2)
Liberia (p)	0 (3)

=== Semi-finals ===
27 May 2024
16:00

Senegal	4–0	Guinea
Pène 12'; A. Ndiaye 38'; W. Ndiaye 61'; Sarr 84'

Stade Lat-Dior, Thiès
Referee: Yacine Samassa (Mauritania)
27 May 2024
19:00

Liberia	1–1	Guinea-Bissau
Quachie 82' (pen.)		F. Alfredo 86'
Penalties
Bogar (penalty missed); Fatomah (penalty missed); Brown (penalty scored); Jackson (penalty missed)	1–3	(penalty missed) F. Bá; (penalty scored) Sanó; (penalty scored) Djata; (penalty scored) F. Alfredo

Stade Lat-Dior, Thiès
Referee: Fatou Ngum (Gambia)

=== Third place match ===
29 May 2024
16:00

Guinea	0–0	Liberia
Penalties
Kourouma (penalty missed); A. Diallo (penalty missed); N. Camara (penalty missed); M. Traoré (penalty scored); Samoura (penalty scored)	2–3	(penalty missed) Brown; (penalty missed) Quachie; (penalty scored) Tokpah; (penalty scored) Fatomah; (penalty scored) Capehart

Stade Lat-Dior, Thiès
Referee: Mariétou Fall (Senegal)

=== Final ===
29 May 2024
19:00

Senegal	3–0	Guinea-Bissau
A. Ndiaye 17'; Pène 19'; Badio 81' (pen.)

Stade Lat-Dior, Thiès
Referee: Aissatou Kanté (Guinea)

== Goalscorers ==
There were 50 goals scored in 16 matches, for an average of 3.12 goals per match.

6 goals

- (Liberia) Edwardline Jackson

4 goals

- (Guinea) Fatoumata Samoura
- (Senegal) Adji Ndiaye

3 goals

- (Liberia) Jessica Quachie
- (Senegal) Rokhyatou Kandé
- (Senegal) Sokhna Pène

2 goals

- (Guinea) Fatoumata Dédé Diallo
- (Liberia) Louise Brown
- (Liberia) Patience Kowolo

1 goal

- (The Gambia) Haddijatou Drammeh
- (The Gambia) Salimata Saidykhan
- (Guinea) Nimatoulaye Diallo
- (Guinea) Nana Camara
- (Guinea) Mamaïssata Cissé
- (Guinea) Binta Conté
- (Guinea-Bissau) Cumba Mamadu Camará
- (Guinea-Bissau) Djara Djata
- (Guinea-Bissau) Flávia Ebatomog Alfredo
- (Liberia) Erica Parsons
- (Liberia) Annieta Tarpeh
- (Liberia) Princess Bogar
- (Liberia) Blessing Gibson
- (Mali) Latifatou Tienou
- (Mali) Djamako Traoré
- (Senegal) Marie Louise Sarr
- (Senegal) Wolimata Ndiaye
- (Senegal) Khadija Badio
- (Sierra Leone) Kadiatu Kamara
- (Sierra Leone) Juliet Brima

1 own goal

- (The Gambia) Wuday Colley (against Senegal)

Source: WAFU A
