= Jessica Quachie =

Liberian footballer (born 2006)

Personal information
- Full name: Jessica Massa Quachie
- Date of birth: December 15, 2006 (age 19)
- Place of birth: West Point, Monrovia, Liberia
- Position: Midfielder

Team information
- Current team: Katamon Jerusalem
- Number: 16

Youth career
- 2015–2019: Monrovia Football Academy

Senior career*
Years	Team	Apps	(Gls)
- Real Muja FC
2024–2025	→ Determine Girls		
2025–	Katamon Jerusalem		

International career
2022–2023	Liberia U17	2	(1)
2020–	Liberia U20	6	(3)
2025–	Liberia	1	(1)
Medal record
Women's football
Representing Liberia
WAFU Zone A U20 Women's Cup
Third place	2024 Senegal
- * Club domestic league appearances and goals

Jessica Massa Quachie (born December 15, 2006) is a Liberian footballer who plays as a midfielder for Katamon Jerusalem of the Ligat Nashim and the Liberia national football team.

== Early life ==
Quachie hails from West Point, a densely populated township in Monrovia, Liberia. She began playing football at the age of six, participating in local street games within her community. In 2015, at the age of nine, she was identified by scouts from the Monrovia Football Academy (MFA), an institution dedicated to developing young football talent in Liberia, and was subsequently enrolled in their school and training program. With whom she participated in several regional tournaments where scouts from European clubs were present. However, due to her young age, she was not eligible to be signed by any club at the time.

== Club career ==
In July 2024, Quachie joined Determine Girls on a half-season loan ahead of the 2024 CAF Women's Champions League qualifiers and the LFA Upper Women's League campaign. During the qualifying tournament held in August, she delivered a series of outstanding performances and was subsequently named the tournament's Most Valuable Player.

In July 2025, Quachie signed with the UK-based Sisu Sports Management to pursue opportunities in European football. Later that month, on 26 July, she agreed to a two-year contract with Ligat Nashim side Katamon Jerusalem.

== International career ==
Quachie began representing Liberia at youth level in 2020, when she received her first call-up to the under-20 national team for a series of friendly matches against Morocco. Following the COVID-19 pandemic, she featured for the under-17 side for the 2022 African U-17 Women's World Cup qualification, where she scored Liberia's only goal in a 7–1 defeat to Guinea. In May 2024, she was part of the Liberia squad that secured the bronze medal, contributing three goals throughout the tournament.

In December 2023, she received her first call-up to the senior national team for a series of friendly matches against Sierra Leone's Malema Queens. She made her first appearance for the Lone Stars during the 2024 Mano River Union Female Tournament, which Liberia ultimately won. Her official senior debut came on May 22, 2025, when she played a key role in Liberia's 3–1 victory over Guinea-Bissau.

=== International goals ===
Scores and results list Liberia's goal tally first, score column indicates score after each Quachie goal.

List of international goals scored by Jessica Quachie
No.	Date	Venue	Opponent	Score	Result	Competition
1	May 22, 2025	Nouakchott, Mauritania	Guinea-Bissau	1–1	3–1	2025 WAFU Zone A Women's Cup
