= 2025 WAFU Zone A U-17 Girls Tournament =

WAFU Zone A U-17 Girls Tournament 2025
Tournoi UFOA A U-17 Féminin 2025

Tournament details
- Host country: Liberia
- Dates: 17–27 September
- Teams: 3 (from 1 sub-confederation)
- Venue: 1 (in 1 host city)

Final positions
- Champions: Sierra Leone (1st title)
- Runners-up: Senegal
- Third place: Liberia

Tournament statistics
- Matches played: 6
- Goals scored: 18 (3 per match)
- Top scorer(s): (Sierra Leone) Ruth Bawoh (Sierra Leone) Sarah Turay (3 goals each)
- Best player: (Sierra Leone) Mariam Sankoh
- Best goalkeeper: (Sierra Leone) Hawa Morison

2025 WAFU Zone A U-17 Girls Tournament (French: Tournoi UFOA A U-17 Féminin 2025) was the inaugural edition of the WAFU Zone A U-17 Girls Tournament, the international women's youth football championship contested by the women's under-17 national teams of the member associations of WAFU Zone A. Liberia hosted the tournament in Paynesville, Monrovia from 17 to 27 September 2025.

Sierra Leone became the first champions of the tournament after remaining unbeaten in the round-robin stage.

== Participation ==
3 (out of 9) WAFU Zone A nations entered the tournament, with hosts Liberia joined by neighbouring Sierra Leone and Senegal.

Team	Appearance
Liberia	1st
Senegal	1st
Sierra Leone	1st

=== Withdrawals ===
- Guinea – On 14 September 2025, the FEGUFOOT withdrew its team due to internal mismanagement and poor governance.
- Mali – On 15 September Agence de presse sénégalaise announced that Senegal and the other two participants would be joined by Mali, with fixtures released. However, the following day, WAFU A confirmed the fixtures with only three teams.

Did not enter

- Cape Verde
- Gambia
- Guinea-Bissau
- Mauritania

== Venue ==
All matches were held in the capital Monrovia.

2025 WAFU Zone A U-17 Girls Tournament is located in Liberia	Paynesville
2025 WAFU Zone A U-17 Girls Tournament is located in Liberia	Samuel Kanyon Doe Sports Complex (SKD Stadium)
2025 WAFU Zone A U-17 Girls Tournament is located in Liberia	Capacity: 22,000

== Standings ==
Pos	Team	Pld	W	D	L	GF	GA	GD	Pts
1st place, gold medalist(s)	Sierra Leone	4	3	1	0	10	3	+7	10
2nd place, silver medalist(s)	Senegal	4	1	1	2	5	5	0	4
3rd place, bronze medalist(s)	Liberia (H)	4	1	0	3	3	10	−7	3

Source: WAFU A
Rules for classification: Group stage tiebreakers
(H) Hosts

== Results ==
All times are local, GMT (UTC±0)

17 September 2025
16:00

Senegal	1–2	Sierra Leone
Barro 53'	Report	Sankoh 21'; S. Turay 76'

Samuel Kanyon Doe Sports Complex, Paynesville
Referee: Sylvina Garnett (Liberia)

19 September 2025
16:00

Sierra Leone	3–0	Liberia
Sankoh 4' (pen.); Bawoh 17'; Deen 84'

Samuel Kanyon Doe Sports Complex, Paynesville
Referee: Alima Diarra (Mali)

21 September 2025
16:00

Liberia	0–2	Senegal
	Report (FSF)	Lo 56', 59'

Samuel Kanyon Doe Sports Complex, Paynesville

23 September 2025
16:00

Sierra Leone	1–1	Senegal
Bawoh 87'		Diouf 45+2'

Samuel Kanyon Doe Sports Complex, Paynesville
Referee: Alima Diarra (Mali)

25 September 2025
16:00

Liberia	1–4	Sierra Leone
Jaleibah 20'		S. Turay 21', 62'; Bawoh 30'; Mas. Turay 80'

Samuel Kanyon Doe Sports Complex, Paynesville
Referee: Mariétou Fall (Senegal)

27 September 2025
16:00

Senegal	1–2	Liberia
Ndiaye 68'		Barro 34' (o.g.); Nuah 41'

Samuel Kanyon Doe Sports Complex, Paynesville
Referee: Aissatou Kanté (Guinea)

== Goalscorers ==
There were 18 goals scored in 6 matches, for an average of 3 goals per match.

3 goals

- (Sierra Leone) Ruth Bawoh
- (Sierra Leone) Sarah Turay

2 goals

- (Senegal) Fatiha Lo
- (Sierra Leone) Marian Sankoh

1 goal

- (Liberia) Yatta Jaleibah
- (Liberia) Musu Nuah
- (Senegal) Ndeye Habi Barro
- (Senegal) Astou Diouf
- (Senegal) Mballo Ndiaye
- (Sierra Leone) Kadijatu Deen
- (Sierra Leone) Maseray Turay

1 own goal

- (Senegal) Ndeye Habi Barro (against Liberia)
