= 2023 WAFU Zone A U-20 Women's Cup =

U-20 Coupe féminine UFOA Zone A Sierra Leone2023

Tournament details
- Host country: Sierra Leone
- Dates: 24-28 May
- Teams: 4 (from 1 sub-confederation)
- Venue: 1 (in 1 host city)

Final positions
- Champions: Senegal (1st title)
- Runners-up: Guinea
- Third place: Sierra Leone
- Fourth place: Guinea-Bissau

Tournament statistics
- Matches played: 6
- Goals scored: 18 (3 per match)
- Top scorer(s): (Senegal) Hapsatou Diallo (5 goals)
- Best player: (Senegal) Hapsatou Diallo
- Best goalkeeper: (Senegal) Khady Faye
- Fair play award: Sierra Leone

The 2023 WAFU Zone A U-20 Women's Cup was the inaugural edition of the WAFU Zone A U20 Women's Cup, the international women's youth football championship contested by the under-20 national teams of the member associations of the West African Football Union Zone A, the tournament took place in Bo, Sierra Leone between 24 May and 28 May 2023.

Senegal secured the inaugural title after it remained undefeated throughout the competition, scoring ten goals and conceding only one.

== Teams ==
=== Participating nations ===
Four (out of 9) WAFU zone A member associations participated in the first edition in Sierra Leone.

Team	App	Last	Best placement in the tournament
Guinea	1st	—N/a	debut
Guinea-Bissau	1st	—N/a	debut
Sierra Leone	1st	—N/a	debut
Senegal	1st	—N/a	debut

Did not enter

- Cape Verde
- Gambia
- Liberia
- Mali
- Mauritania

=== Draw ===
The final draw took place at the Southern Arena conference room Bo, Sierra Leone, on 23 May 2023 .

== Venues ==
on 30 March 2023, WAFU A announced Bo as the host city and confirmed venues selected for the tournament.

- Southern Arena

== Squads ==
Players born between 1 January 2003 and 31 December 2007 are eligible to compete in the tournament.

- Senegal

== Group Stage ==
All times are local, GMT (UTC-1)

Pos	Team	Pld	W	D	L	GF	GA	GD	Pts
1	Senegal	3	3	0	0	10	1	+9	9
2	Guinea	3	1	1	1	4	4	0	4
3	Sierra Leone	3	1	1	1	3	5	−2	4
4	Guinea-Bissau	3	0	0	3	1	8	−7	0

Source: Wosoworld
Rules for classification: Group stage tiebreakers
24 May 2023
16:00

Sierra Leone	1–1	Guinea
K. Kamara 2'	Report (FGF); Report (CAF)	D. Diallo 44'

Southern Arena, Bo, Sierra Leone
24 May 2023
19:00

Senegal	4–0	Guinea-Bissau
H. Diallo 4', 58', 69'; Ndiaye 53'

Southern Arena, Bo, Sierra Leone

26 May 2023
16:00

Guinea	1–3	Senegal
D. Diallo 31'	Report (FGF); Report (CAF)	Samba 72'; H. Diallo 77'; Badio 78'

Southern Arena, Bo, Sierra Leone
26 May 2023
19:00

Sierra Leone	2–1	Guinea-Bissau
Turay 57'; Brima 74'	Report (CAF)	Jessica 90+4'

Southern Arena, Bo, Sierra Leone

28 May 2023
16:00

Guinea-Bissau	0–2	Guinea
	Report (FGF); Report (CAF)	N. Camara 81'; Bangoura 90+5'

Southern Arena, Bo, Sierra Leone
28 May 2023
19:00

Senegal	3–0	Sierra Leone
H. Diallo 1'; Sylla Mbodji 18'; S. Diallo 83'	Report (CAF)

Southern Arena, Bo, Sierra Leone

== Awards ==
The following awards were given for the tournament:

Best Player
(Senegal) Hapsatou Diallo
Top Scorer
(Senegal) Hapsatou Diallo (5 goals)
GoalKeeper of the Tournament
(Senegal) Khady Faye
Fair Play Award
Sierra Leone

== Goalscorers ==
There were 18 goals scored in 6 matches, for an average of 3 goals per match (as of 3 June 2023).

5 goals

- (Senegal) Hapsatou Diallo

2 goals

- (Guinea) Fatoumata Dédé Diallo

1 goal

- (Guinea) Nana Camara
- (Guinea) Aminata Bangoura
- (Sierra Leone) Kadiatu Kamara
- (Sierra Leone) Sally Turay
- (Sierra Leone) Juliet Brima
- (Senegal) Wolimata Ndiaye
- (Senegal) Aminata Samba
- (Senegal) Khadija Badio
- (Senegal) Sadigatou Diallo
- (Senegal) Coumba Sylla Mbodji
- (Guinea-Bissau) Jessica Da Costa
