= 2024 Women's Day Cup =

Tournament details
- Host country: Sierra Leone
- City: Kenema
- Dates: 1 March–8 March
- Teams: 6 (from 1 confederation)

Final positions
- Champions: Sierra Leone; Sierra Leone U-17

The 2024 Women's Day Cup was an association football friendly tournament hosted by Sierra Leone. It took place from 1 March to 8 March 2024.

The U-17 tournament was won by Sierra Leone U-17, and the joint U-20 and senior team tournament was won by Sierra Leone's senior team.

== Groups ==
=== U-17 group ===
Pos	Team	Pld	W	D	L	GF	GA	GD	Pts
1	Sierra Leone	4	2	2	0	5	3	+2	8
2	Liberia	4	0	2	2	3	5	−2	2

Source: SLFA

=== U-20 and senior group ===
8 March 2024

Sierra Leone	2–0	Liberia U-20
Kamara 38'; Kargbo 90+2'	Report
