= Wolimata Ndiaye =

Senegalese footballer (born 2004)

Personal information
- Date of birth: 10 January 2004 (age 22)
- Place of birth: Rufisque, Senegal
- Position: Defender

Team information
- Current team: Thonon Evian GG FC
- Number: 5

Senior career*
Years	Team	Apps	(Gls)
–2023	ASC Dorades Mbour		
2023–2024	AS Bambey		
2024–	Thonon Evian GG FC	15	(1)

International career
2021–2024	Senegal U20	22	(3)
2023–	Senegal	23	(1)
Medal record
Women's football
Representing Senegal
WAFU Zone A Women's Cup
Winner	Cape Verde 2023
WAFU Zone A U20 Women's Cup
Winner	Sierra Leone 2023
Winner	Senegal 2024
- * Club domestic league appearances and goals

Wolimata Ndiaye (born 10 January 2004) is a Senegalese professional footballer who plays as a defender for Seconde Ligue club Thonon Evian Grand Genève FC and the Senegal national football team.

== Club career ==
In March 2024, Ndiaye signed her first professional contract abroad, joining French Division 2 Féminine side Thonon Evian GG FC.

== International career ==
Ndiaye began representing Senegal at the under-20 level in 2021, taking part in two FIFA U-20 Women's World Cup qualifying campaigns in 2022 and 2024. She also helped the team win back-to-back WAFU Zone A regional tournaments in 2023 and 2024, captaining the side during the latter edition.

In January 2023, at the age of 19, she received her first call-up to the senior national team for the 2023 WAFU Zone A Women's Cup held in Cape Verde. Since then, she has established herself as a regular member of the Senegalese squad. On May 22, 2025, she scored her first international goal in a 2–1 victory over Guinea at the 2025 WAFU Zone A Women's Cup.

=== International goals ===
Scores and results list Senegal's goal tally first, score column indicates score after each Ndiaye goal.

No.	Date	Venue	Opponent	Score	Result	Competition
1	22 May 2025	Cheikha Ould Boïdiya Stadium, Nouakchott, Mauritania	Guinea	1–0	2–1	2025 WAFU Zone A Women's Cup

== Honours ==
Senegal

- WAFU Zone A Women's Cup: 2023

Senegal U20

- WAFU Zone A U20 Women's Cup: 2023, 2024
