= Rachael Muema =

Kenyan footballer (born 1999)

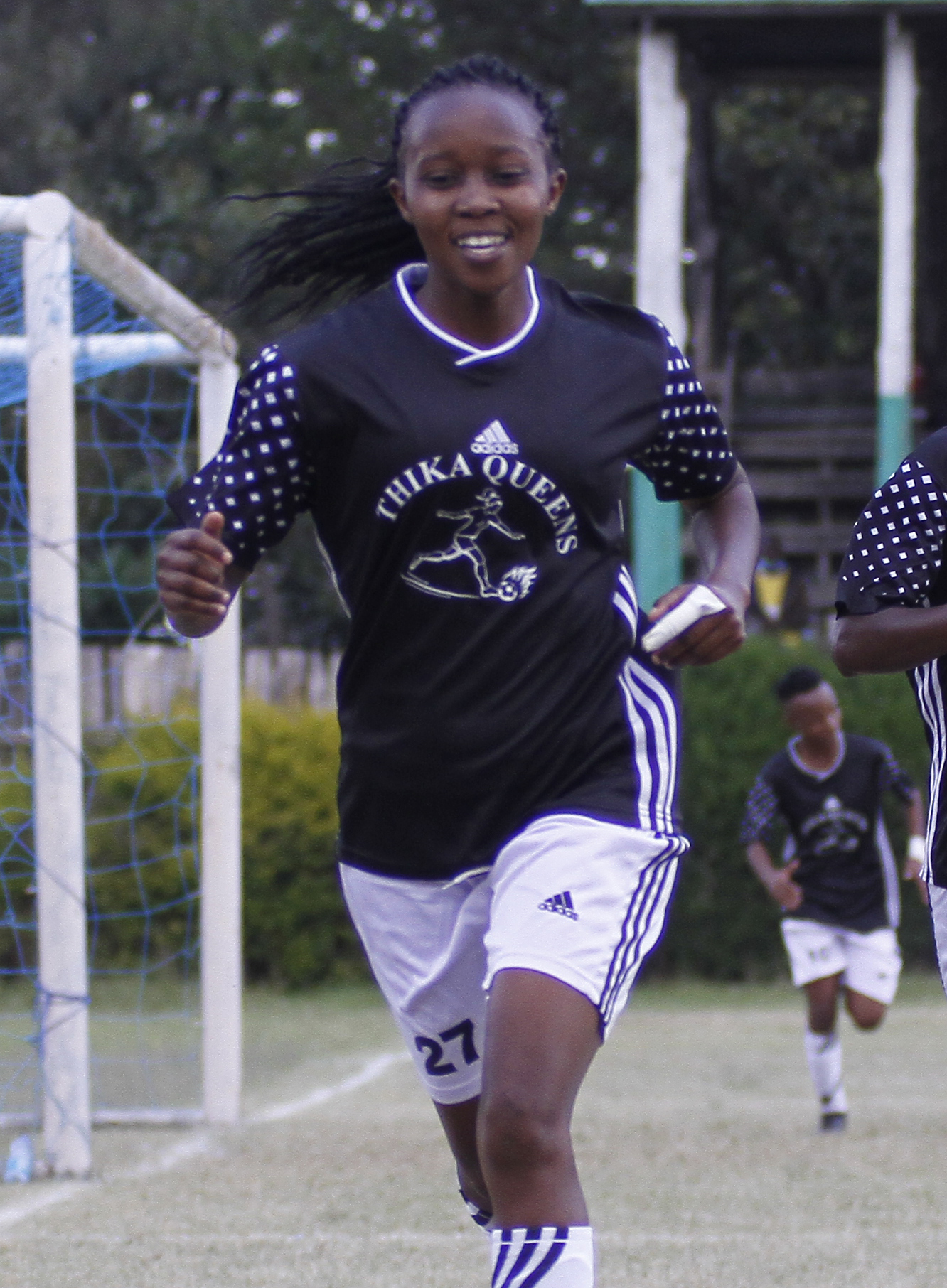
Rachael Muema celebrating her goal for Thika Queens against Gaspo Women FC in the Kenyan Women's Premier League final, on Sunday, June 27, 2021

Rachael Muema (born 6 October 1999) is a Kenyan professional footballer who plays as a midfielder or Winger (football) for Kenyan Women's Premier League club Thika Queens and the Kenya women's national football team. She has won the Kenyan Women's Premier League once and was included in the Kenya women's national football team for the 2020 Turkish Women's Cup

Rachael began her career with Thika Queens immediately after completing high school in 2016. In 2017, she earned her debut call-up in the Kenya women's u20 team, and took part in the 2018 African U-20 Women's World Cup Qualifying Tournament, scoring Kenya's only goal in the 5–1 home loss against the Ghana women's u20 team.

== Early life ==
At age 7, Rachael began playing football with village boys in Kitui County. She later was selected to represent Mutanda Primary School in the national ball games. She continued playing football for Nginda Girls High School, where she was later made captain and led the school in many inter-school games, including national and East African high school competitions. Muema's role model is Doreen Nabwire and inspired by the former Kenyan international's football journey and her record of being the inaugural Kenyan woman to play professional football in Europe as her dream is to play in Europe.

== Club career ==
Rachael has played for her current club, Thika Queens, since joining from high school in 2016, to date. She has grown to be an integral part of the team by scoring and assisting goals. She helped the club win the 2020-21 Kenyan Women's Premier League by scoring 7 goals and registering 10 assists in 14 matches.

== International career ==
=== Youth ===
Less than a year after joining Thika Queens, Rachael earned her first Kenya women's national under-20 football team call up in August 2017 for a friendly match against Jordan women's national football team in preparation for the 2018 African U-20 Women's World Cup Qualifying Tournament. She was also included in the squad that eliminated Ethiopia Women's U-20 team in the first round of the qualifiers. She debuted in the second round of the qualifiers against the Ghana women's national under-20 football team, scoring Kenya's only goal in the 5–1 defeat at home

=== Senior ===
Rachael earned her debut senior call-up in 2020; she was included in the squad for the 2020 Turkish Women's Cup. After the CCVID-19 outbreak, she was handed another call-up in April 2021, for a friendly match against Zambia, which was later suspended as a precautionary measure against the virus.

== See also ==
- List of Kenya women's international footballers
