= WAFU Zone A U20 Women's Cup =

International age group women's football tournament

WAFU Zone A U-20 Women's Tournament
- Organiser(s): WAFU/UFOA A
- Founded: 2023; 3 years ago
- Region: West Africa
- Teams: 9 (maximum)
- Current champions: Senegal (2nd title)
- Most championships: Senegal (2 titles)
- 2026 WAFU Zone A U-20 Women's Tournament

The WAFU Zone A U20 Women's Cup is a women's association football competition contested by national teams of Zone A West African Football Union.

The first edition will take place from May 24 to June 4, 2023, in Bo with four teams .

== Results ==
Ed.	Year	Host	Final			Third place game			Num. teams
Ed.	Year	Host	(gold) Champions	Score	(silver) Runners-up	(bronze) Third place	Score	Fourth place	Num. teams
1	2023	Sierra Leone	Senegal	Round-robin	Guinea	Sierra Leone	Round-robin	Guinea-Bissau	4
2	2024	Senegal	Senegal	3–0	Guinea-Bissau	Liberia	0–0 (3–2 p)	Guinea	8
3	2026	Guinea-Bissau	Senegal	Round-robin	Liberia	Gambia	Round-robin	Mali	5

== Participating nations ==
Legend

- 1st – Champions
- 2nd – Runners-up
- 3rd – Third place
- 4th – Fourth place
- SF – Losing semi-finals
- QF – Quarter-finals
- GS – Group stage
- Q — Qualified for upcoming tournament
- • – Did not participate
- × – Withdrew
- – Hosts

Team	(Sierra Leone) 2023	(Senegal) 2024	(Guinea-Bissau) 2026	Years
Cape Verde	•	•	•	0
Gambia	•	GS	3rd	2
Guinea	2nd	4th	•	2
Guinea-Bissau	4th	2nd	5th	3
Liberia	•	3rd	2nd	2
Mali	•	GS	4th	2
Mauritania	•	GS	•	1
Senegal	1st	1st	1st	3
Sierra Leone	3rd	GS	•	2
Total (8 Teams)	4	8	5	
