= Adji Ndiaye =

Senegalese footballer (born 2006)

Personal information
- Full name: Adji Ndiaye
- Date of birth: 4 August 2006 (age 20)
- Place of birth: Toubab Dialaw, Senegal
- Height: 1.77 m (5 ft 10 in)
- Position: Goalkeeper

Team information
- Current team: Bourges Foot
- Number: 40

Senior career*
| Years | Team | Apps | (Gls) |
| 2021–2022 | US Parcelles Assainies | | |
| 2022–2023 | AS Dakar Sacré-Cœur | | |
| 2023–2025 | AS Bambey | | |
| 2025– | Bourges Foot | | |

International career
| 2023– | Senegal | 21 | (0) |
- * Club domestic league appearances and goals

Adji Ndiaye (born 4 August 2006) is a Senegalese professional footballer who plays as a goalkeeper for French club Bourges Foot and the Senegal women's national football team.

Known for her versatility, Ndiaye has also featured as an outfield player during her youth international career, having played as both a midfielder and a forward before establishing herself as a goalkeeper. During the 2026 Women's Africa Cup of Nations, she gained international recognition after saving two penalties in a group-stage match against hosts Morocco.

== Early life ==
Adji Ndiaye was born on 4 August 2006 in Toubab Dialaw, Senegal.

Ndiaye began playing football at a young age and developed as a versatile player capable of playing in multiple positions. Although she would later establish herself as a goalkeeper, she also featured as a midfielder and a forward during her youth career.

Her ability to alternate between goalkeeping and outfield roles attracted attention in Senegal, particularly after scoring for the Senegal under-20 women's national team while also playing as a goalkeeper for her club and the senior national team.

== Club career ==
=== Early career ===
Ndiaye began her senior career with US Parcelles Assainies, where she played as a goalkeeper. In 2022, she helped the club win the Senegalese Women's Championship and the Senegalese Women's Cup.

She represented US Parcelles Assainies at the 2022 WAFU Zone A Women's Champions League qualifiers, where the club competed against the leading women's clubs from West Africa.

In 2022, Ndiaye joined AS Dakar Sacré-Cœur, where she spent one season before signing for AS Bambey in 2023.

=== AS Bambey ===
After joining AS Bambey in 2023, Ndiaye established herself as one of the club's standout players. While continuing to feature for Senegal's youth teams as an outfield player, she remained AS Bambey's first-choice goalkeeper and earned regular call-ups to the Senegal women's national team.

=== Bourges Foot ===
On 4 December 2025, Ndiaye signed for French Division 3 club Bourges Foot, becoming one of the latest Senegalese women's internationals to move abroad. The transfer marked her first professional experience outside Senegal. Following her arrival in France, Ndiaye continued to demonstrate her versatility. On 17 May 2026, during a Division 3 Féminine match against Molsheim-Ernolsheim, Bourges head coach Sandrine Jacquet introduced the goalkeeper as an outfield substitute late in the game. In stoppage time, after Lola Chezeau's long-range effort struck the crossbar, Ndiaye reacted quickest to score the rebound and secure a 1–0 victory for Bourges.

== International career ==
=== Youth ===
Ndiaye represented Senegal at youth international level, featuring for the under-20 team. Although primarily a goalkeeper, she was occasionally deployed as an outfield player because of her versatility. On 8 October 2023, she scored Senegal's second goal in a 2–0 victory over Benin in the first leg of the second round of qualification for the 2024 FIFA U-20 Women's World Cup. In May 2024, Ndiaye represented Senegal at the 2024 WAFU Zone A U-20 Women's Cup. Deployed as an outfield player, she scored the opening goal in the final against Guinea-Bissau, helping Senegal secure the regional title.

=== Senior ===
Ndiaye received her first senior call-up to the Senegal women's national football team in 2023 and established herself as one of the country's emerging goalkeepers.

She was named in Senegal's squad for the 2024 Women's Africa Cup of Nations, held in Morocco in 2025.

In October 2025, Ndiaye was shortlisted for the CAF Awards in the categories of Women's Young Player of the Year and Women's Goalkeeper of the Year, becoming one of only a handful of Senegalese players nominated for multiple individual awards. She later advanced to the final three-player shortlist for the Young Player of the Year award.

During the 2026 Women's Africa Cup of Nations, Ndiaye produced one of the tournament's standout goalkeeping performances in Senegal's final Group A match against hosts Morocco. She saved two second-half penalties, stopping the initial attempt before saving the retaken kick after a VAR review ordered a retake for encroachment to preserve a 0–0 draw. Despite her heroics, Senegal were eliminated from the competition after finishing third in the group.

== Honours ==
US Parcelles Assainies

- Senegalese Women's Championship: 2022
- Senegalese Women's Cup: 2022

AS Dakar Sacré-Cœur

- Senegalese Women's Championship: 2023

Senegal U20

- WAFU Zone A U-20 Women's Cup: 2024

Individual

- CAF Women's Young Player of the Year: Finalist (2025)
- CAF Women's Goalkeeper of the Year: Nominee (2025)
