= Senegal women's national under-17 football team =

Senegal women's U-17
- Nickname: Lionesses de la Téranga
- Association: Senegal Football Federation
- Confederation: CAF (Africa)
- Sub-confederation: WAFU (West Africa)
- FIFA code: SEN
First colours	Second colours

African U-17 Women's World Cup qualification
- Appearances: 3 (first in 2022)
- Best result: Third Round (2024)

Senegal women's national under-17 football team is a youth association football team operated under the auspices of Senegalese Football Federation. Its primary role is the development of players in preparation for the senior Senegal women's national football team.

== Competitive record ==
=== FIFA U-17 Women's World Cup record ===
FIFA U-17 Women's World Cup
Year	Result	Pld	W	D *	L	GF	GA
(New Zealand) 2008	Did not enter						
(Trinidad and Tobago) 2010	Did not enter						
(Azerbaijan) 2012	Did not enter						
(Costa Rica) 2014	Did not enter						
(Jordan) 2016	Did not enter						
(Uruguay) 2018	Did not enter						
(India) 2022	Did not qualify						
(Dominican Republic) 2024	Did not qualify						
(Morocco) 2025	To be determined						
Total	0/9						

== See also ==
- Senegal women's national football team
- Senegal women's national under-20 football team
