= Vivian Corazone =

Kenyan footballer (born 1998)

Personal information
- Full name: Vivian Corazone Aquino Odhiambo
- Date of birth: 2 October 1998 (age 28)
- Place of birth: Nairobi, Kenya
- Height: 1.85 m (6 ft 1 in)
- Position: Midfielder

Team information
- Current team: Simba Queens

Youth career
- 2007–2012: Masa Babes

Senior career*
Years	Team	Apps	(Gls)
2016–2019	Soccer Queens		(2)
2020–2021	Atlético Ouriense	1	(1)
2021– 2022	Gaspo Youth		
2022 –	Simba Queens		

International career^{‡}
- Kenya U20
2015–	Kenya	4	(4)
- * Club domestic league appearances and goals as of 23 February 2020 ‡ National team caps and goals as of 02 December 2016

Vivian Corazone Aquino Odhiambo (born 2 October 1998), known as Vivian Corazone, is a Kenyan footballer who plays as a midfielder for Simba Queens and the Kenya women's national team. She is known for her ability to use both feet and trickery on the ball.

== Club career ==
=== Early career ===
Masa Babes

Corazone started playing football at Nairobi's Makongeni based side Masa Babes in 2007 at the age of 9.

Makongeni High school

Makongeni High school in Nairobi enrolled Corazone for her secondary education in 2012, she played for the school's football team until she left in 2013.

Olympic High school

In 2013, Corazone joined Olympic High school in 2013, she played for the school's football team and was part of the team that won the 2013 National Crown and participated in the East Africa Secondary school games.

=== Senior career ===
Soccer Queens

Soccer Queens acquired Corazone's services immediately after she finished high school, she has two goals and six assists in the 2016 Kenya Women Premier League, and is also captain of Soccer Queens. Corazone, is currently playing for Simba Queens which is a sister team of Simba Sports club of Tanzania.

== International career ==
In 2014, Corazone was the captain of the Kenya women's national under-17 team, which was coached by Kadualo. She now represents Kenya at senior level and has 4 goals to her name.

== Personal life ==
Corazone was named after the former President of the Philippines, Corazon Aquino.

== See also ==
- List of Kenya women's international footballers
