= Guinea-Bissau women's national under-20 football team =

Guinea-Bissau Under-20
- Association: Football Federation of Guinea-Bissau
- Confederation: CAF (Africa)
- Sub-confederation: WAFU (West Africa)
- Head coach: Devil Cá
- FIFA code: GNB
First colours	Second colours

First international
- Mauritania 0–6 Guinea-Bissau (Nouakchott, Mauritania; 18 January 2020)

Biggest win
- Guinea-Bissau 9–0 Mauritania (Bissau, Guinea-Bissau; 1 February 2020)

Biggest defeat
- Senegal 4–0 Guinea-Bissau (Bo, Sierra Leone; 24 May 2023)

African U-20 World Cup qualification
- Appearances: 3 (first in 2014)
- Best result: Round 2 (2024)

FIFA U-20 Women's World Cup
- Appearances: None

The Guinea-Bissau women's national under-20 football team represents Guinea-Bissau in international youth women's football competitions. Its primary role is the development of players in preparation for the senior women's national team. The team competes in a variety of competitions, including the biennial African U-20 Women's World Cup qualification, which is the top competitions for this age group.

== Players ==
=== Current squad ===
The following players were called up for the 2026 African U-20 Women's World Cup qualification matches against Malawi on 7 and 14 February 2026.

No.	Pos.	Player	Date of birth (age)	Club
1	GK	Adji Saco	7 September 2006 (age 20)	(Football Federation of Guinea-Bissau) Fidjus di Bideras - TCB
2	DF	Latifa Sarr	12 April 2006 (age 20)	(Football Federation of Guinea-Bissau) Fidjus di Bideras - TCB
3	DF	Joia Mendes	14 September 2010 (age 16)	(Football Federation of Guinea-Bissau) FC Canchungo
4	DF	Cumba Camará	24 May 2007 (age 19)	(Senegalese Football Federation) Amazones de Grand-Yoff
5	MF	Fatumata Bá (Captain)	13 September 2006 (age 20)	(Football Federation of Guinea-Bissau) SB Benfica
6	MF	Lindinha da Silva	18 December 2008 (age 17)	(Football Federation of Guinea-Bissau) Academia Celton BIAI
7	FW	Julieta Iala	11 July 2007 (age 19)	(Senegalese Football Federation) Jappo Olympique
8	MF	Quinta da Silva	12 August 2008 (age 18)	(Football Federation of Guinea-Bissau) Academia Celton BIAI
9	FW	Fidélia daCosta	9 August 2006 (age 20)	(Senegalese Football Federation) Jappo Olympique
10	MF	Juilda Cá	3 July 2008 (age 18)	(Football Federation of Guinea-Bissau) Ajuda Sport
11	FW	Arlete Gomes	17 June 2007 (age 19)	(Football Federation of Guinea-Bissau) Fidjus di Bideras - TCB
12	GK	Mira da Costa	19 February 2010 (age 16)	(Football Federation of Guinea-Bissau) Nuno Tristão FC
13	DF	Suncar Camará	11 February 2009 (age 17)	(Football Federation of Guinea-Bissau) Ajuda Sport
14	MF	Maria Isabel Monteiro	27 November 2009 (age 16)	(Football Federation of Guinea-Bissau) UD Internacional
15	DF	Jaci Gomes	23 January 2008 (age 18)	(Football Federation of Guinea-Bissau) Sporting de Bissau
16	DF	Janua Gomes	23 January 2008 (age 18)	(Football Federation of Guinea-Bissau) Sporting de Bissau
17	FW	Lidania Sancá	4 October 2007 (age 19)	(Football Federation of Guinea-Bissau) UD Internacional
19	FW	Lamarana Bari	30 December 2007 (age 18)	(Football Federation of Guinea-Bissau) Academia Celton BIAI

== Competitive record ==
=== FIFA U-20 Women's World Cup record ===
FIFA U-20 Women's World Cup record									Qualification record						
Host nation(s) and year	Round	Pos	Pld	W	D	L	GF	GA	Round	Pld	W	D	L	GF	GA
(Canada) 2002	Did not enter								Did not enter						
(Thailand) 2004	Did not enter								Did not enter						
(Russia) 2006	Did not enter								Did not enter						
(Chile) 2008	Did not enter								Did not enter						
(Germany) 2010	Did not enter								Did not enter						
(Japan) 2012	Did not enter								Did not enter						
(Canada) 2014	Withdrew								First round	Withdrew					
(Papua New Guinea) 2016	Did not enter								Did not enter						
(France) 2018	Did not enter								Did not enter						
(Costa Rica) (Panama) 2020	Cancelled								First round	2	2	0	0	15	0
(Costa Rica) 2022	Withdrew								First round	Withdrew					
(Colombia) 2024	Did not qualify								Second round	4	2	0	2	6	7
(Poland) 2026	To be determined								Third round	Qualification on going					
Total	0/12	—	—	—	—	—	—	—	Best: Third round	6	4	0	2	21	7

=== WAFU Zone A U-20 Women's Cup ===
WAFU Zone A U20 Women's Cup record
Host nation(s) and year	Result	Pld	W	D	L	GF	GA
(Sierra Leone) 2023	Fourth place	3	0	0	3	1	8
(Senegal) 2024	Runners-up	5	0	3	2	3	7
Total	2/2	8	0	3	5	4	15

== See also ==
- Guinea-Bissau women's national football team
- Guinea-Bissau women's national under-17 football team
