= Liberia women's national under-17 football team =

Liberia women's U-17
- Association: Liberia Football Association
- Confederation: CAF (Africa)
- Sub-confederation: WAFU (West Africa)
- FIFA code: LBR
| First colours | Second colours |

African U-17 Women's World Cup qualification
- Appearances: 3 (first in 2008)
- Best result: Fourth round (2024)

FIFA U-17 Women's World Cup
- Appearances: None

Liberia women's national under-17 football team is a youth association football team operated under the auspices of Liberia Football Association. Its primary role is the development of players in preparation for the senior Liberia women's national football team.

== Competitive record ==
=== FIFA U-17 Women's World Cup record ===
FIFA U-17 Women's World Cup
| Year | Result | Pld | W | D * | L | GF | GA |
|---|---|---|---|---|---|---|---|
| (New Zealand) 2008 | Did not qualify | | | | | | |
| (Trinidad and Tobago) 2010 | Did not enter | | | | | | |
| (Azerbaijan) 2012 | Did not enter | | | | | | |
| (Costa Rica) 2014 | Did not enter | | | | | | |
| (Jordan) 2016 | Did not enter | | | | | | |
| (Uruguay) 2018 | Did not enter | | | | | | |
| (India) 2022 | Did not qualify | | | | | | |
| (Dominican Republic) 2024 | Did not qualify | | | | | | |
| (Morocco) 2025 | Did not enter | | | | | | |
| Total | 0/9 | | | | | | |

== See also ==
- Liberia women's national football team
- Liberia women's national under-20 football team
