= Monrovia Football Academy =

Liberian football club

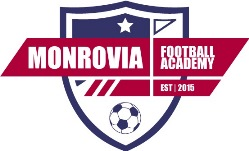
- Founded: 2015
- Type: Educational Sports Charity
- Location: Monrovia, Liberia
- Region served: Liberia
- Product: Sports, education and leadership academy in Liberia
- Key people: Sona Traore, Executive Director
- Website: monroviafa.com

Founded in 2015, Monrovia Football Academy is the first school in Liberia to combine formal education with football development.

== Overview ==
The academy provides Liberian boys and girls with academic classes, football training, and life skills lessons to break down gender barriers, improve academic performance and produce well-rounded leaders. In the 2016–17 school year, the academy has 50 students (30 boys and 20 girls) from ages 8–12 in the 3rd, 4th, and 5th grades. Students are at the academy from 9:00am–6:00pm, Monday-Friday, with football training in the morning, lunch at noon, and academic classes in the afternoon.

== Core Programs ==
=== Education ===
The academy uses football – the most popular sport in Liberia – as an incentive to encourage student-athletes to attend school and improve academic performance.

=== Football ===
The academy delivers professional coaching and a comprehensive football curriculum that disrupts bad habits, introduces fundamental techniques, and encourages student-athletes to "think about the game" at a high level.

=== Gender Equality ===
The academy uses education and football to break down gender barriers. By studying and training with the boys – and often outperforming them both in the classroom and on the pitch – the academy's girls have a sense of empowerment they themselves vocalize.

== Notable Supporters ==
=== Jill Ellis ===
Monrovia Football Academy hosted Jill Ellis - the U.S. Women's National Soccer Team Coach and 2015 FIFA Coach of the Year - on November 29-December 2, 2016. Ellis was accompanied by the U.S. Women's National Soccer Team goalkeeper Ashlyn Harris. Ellis and Harris visited as Sport Envoys sponsored by U.S. Embassy Monrovia, U.S. Soccer, and Sports United, which is the Department of State's division devoted to sports diplomacy. Ellis is an official Monrovia Football Academy Ambassador.

=== Ashlyn Harris ===
Ashlyn Harris is an American soccer player and FIFA Women's World Cup champion who is currently a goalkeeper for the United States women's national soccer team and Orlando Pride in the National Women's Soccer League. Harris accompanied her U.S. national team coach, Jill Ellis, to Liberia from November 29-December 2, 2016.
