= Rania Salmi =

Moroccan footballer

Personal information
- Date of birth: 14 October 1998 (age 28)
- Place of birth: Morocco
- Height: 1.67 m (5 ft 6 in)
- Position: Striker

Team information
- Current team: Al Ahli SFC

Youth career
- Wydad AC

Senior career*
Years	Team	Apps	(Gls)
2018–2021	Atlas 05		
2021–2023	SC Casablanca		
2023–	Al-Ahli		
2023–2024	→ Wydad AC		

International career
2017–2019	Morocco U20	4	(1)
2017–	Morocco	12	(1)
- * Club domestic league appearances and goals

Rania Salmi (Arabic: رانيا السالمي; born 14 October 1998) is a Moroccan footballer who plays as a striker for Saudi club Al Ahli SFC and the Morocco women's national team.

== Club career ==
Salmi has trained with Wydad AC. In 2018, she left Wydad to join the club Atlas 05. In 2021, she joined Sporting Casablanca, who were promoted to the first division. Atlas 05 and Sporting Casablanca subsequently merged. With Sporting Casablanca, Salmi was runner-up for the Throne Cup in 2022, losing 0–5 to AS FAR. She was voted the best player in the Moroccan Women's Championship by DMC Sport for the month of April. In 2023, she joined the Saudi Women's Premier League team Al Ahli SFC, joining fellow Morocco-international Ibtissam Jraidi.

== International career ==
Salmi has capped for Morocco at under-20 and senior levels. At the U-20 level, she participated in qualifiers for the 2018 FIFA U-20 World Cup. She scored in Morocco's first round victory versus Senegal, but lost to Nigeria in the second round.

She was first called up for Morocco in 2018. She scored her first international goal against Tunisia in a friendly match. She participated in the 2021 Aisha Buhari Cup in Nigeria.

=== International goals ===
Scores and results list Morocco's goal tally first

No.	Date	Venue	Opponent	Score	Result	Competition	Ref.
1	31 January 2020	Stade Municipal de Témara, Temara, Morocco	Tunisia	2–1	6–3	Friendly	

== See also ==
- List of Morocco women's international footballers
