= Folusho Ajayi =

Nigerian association football referee

- Other occupation: Sport

Domestic
Years	League	Role
2014 - present	NPFL	Referee

Folusho Ajayi is a Nigerian association football referee. A FIFA badge referee since January 2015, Ajayi has officiated in Nigeria Premier League, Nigeria Women Premier League, Africa Women Cup of Nations qualifiers and FIFA U-20 Women's World Cup qualifying games.

Described as being controversial by the media, she controversially blew her whistle for halftime when the ball was in motion towards the net of the home team, Kano Pillars after a free-kick was taken during the opening game of the 2017 Nigeria Professional Football League. The game was abandoned by Ifeanyi Ubah F.C. at the Sani Abacha Stadium. Wale Ajayi of Africanfootball.com explains that even though she played by the rules, she made a lot of wrong calls during the game and shouldn't have spent time building a wall for the free-kick to be taken if she was going to end the game immediately. The unsatisfactory nature of the game led to sanctions for IUFC and the league board recommending her suspension to the Nigeria Referees Association from premier league matches, however the NRA issued a vote of confidence to her decisions in the game. After matchday one, she was left out of officiating NPFL games during match day two and three but returned to ref the matchday four encounter between Gombe United F.C. and Plateau United F.C. In 2016 Nigeria Professional Football League, two of the games she officiated was abandoned with one of the games attributed to being instrumental in the relegation of Heartland F.C.

In June 2016, she officiated the matchday 24 encounter between Enugu Rangers and Warri Wolves. She was praised for her control of the game, described as "impeccable" by both the winning and losing teams.

== List of games officiated ==
! Date	Venue	Home	Away	Result	Competition	Notes
25 January 2017		Gombe United F.C.	Plateau United F.C.	0 – 0	2017 Nigeria Professional Football League	issued 3 yellow cards
14 January 2017	Sani Abacha Stadium	Kano Pillars F.C.	Ifeanyi Ubah F.C.	1 – 0	2017 Nigeria Professional Football League	match abandoned at 60th minute
10 May 2017	Legacy Pitch, National Stadium	FC Robo	Sunshine Queens F.C.	3 – 1	2017 Nigeria Women Premier League	
28 July 2016	Lekan Salami Stadium (neutral)	Rivers United F.C.	Enyimba F.C.	0 – 1	Nigeria Federation Cup	match abandoned
2 October 2016	Rwang Pam Stadium	Plateau United F.C.	Heartland F.C.	1 – 1	2016 Nigeria Professional Football League	match abandoned at 75th minute
