= Sierra Leone women's national under-17 football team =

Sierra Leone women's U-17
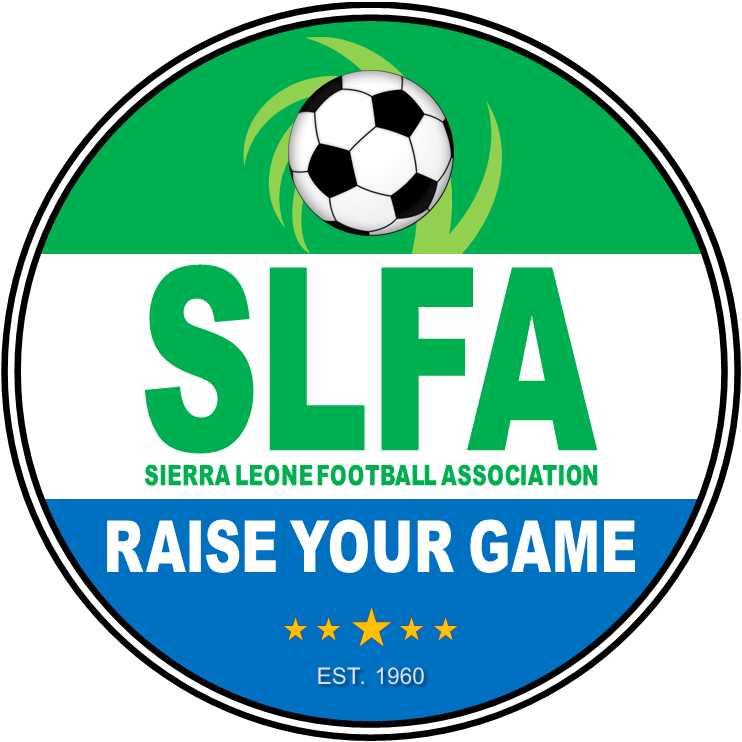
- Association: SLFA
- Confederation: CAF (Africa)
- Sub-confederation: WAFU (West Africa)
- FIFA code: SLE
First colours	Second colours

African U-17 Women's World Cup qualification
- Appearances: 4 (first in 2012)
- Best result: Round 2 (2025)

FIFA U-17 Women's World Cup
- Appearances: None

Sierra Leone women's national under-17 football team is a youth association football team operated under the auspices of the Sierra Leone Football Association. Its primary role is the development of players in preparation for the senior Sierra Leone women's national football team.

== Competitive record ==
=== FIFA U-17 Women's World Cup record ===
FIFA U-17 Women's World Cup
Year	Result	Pld	W	D *	L	GF	GA
(New Zealand) 2008	Did not enter						
(Trinidad and Tobago) 2010	Did not enter						
(Azerbaijan) 2012	Did not enter						
(Costa Rica) 2014	Did not enter						
(Jordan) 2016	Did not enter						
(Uruguay) 2018	Did not enter						
(India) 2022	Did not enter						
(Dominican Republic) 2024	Did not enter						
(Morocco) 2025	Did not qualify						
Total	0/8						

== See also ==
- Sierra Leone women's national football team
- Sierra Leone women's national under-20 football team
