= Kenya women's national under-20 football team =

Kenya
- Nickname: Harambee Starlets
- Association: Football Kenya Federation
- Confederation: CAF (Africa)
- Sub-confederation: CECAFA (East and Central Africa)
- Head coach: Charles Okere
- Home stadium: Nyayo National Stadium
- FIFA code: KEN
First colours	Second colours

African U-20 Women's World Cup qualification
- Appearances: 5 (first in 2006)
- Best result: Round 3 (2024)

FIFA U-20 Women's World Cup
- Appearances: None

The Kenya women's national under-20 football team represents Kenya at an under-20 level in women's football and is controlled by the Football Kenya Federation.

== The team ==
In 2006, the under-19 national team had 2 training sessions a week. The country participated in the African Women U-20 Championship 2006. They were supposed to play Congo-Brazzaville in Round 1 but Congo-Brazzaville withdrew from the competition. In the second round, they played Nigeria in Nigeria, losing 0–8. At home in the return match, they lost 1–2. The under-20 national team competed in the 2010/2011 FIFA U-20 CAF Women's World Cup qualifying competition. They did not advance to the U20 Women's World Cup. In the preliminary round, they tied Lesotho 2-2 in a home match for Lesotho. In the home leg, they beat Lesotho 2-0. In the first-round qualifiers, they lost to Zambia 2-1 in a home game for Zambia. They beat Zambia 4-0 in the home leg. In the qualifiers, they lost to Tunisia at home 1–2 in the second round. In 2012, the Zambian side was coached by Martha Kapombo. In the African qualification tournament for the U20 World Cup, Zambia lost to Kenya by an aggregate of 5-2 from the two matches, one home and away for both teams. Zambia lost the second match at Nyayo National Stadium in Nairobi by a score of 0-4. In a mid-February game, they had beaten Kenya 2-1 at Sunset Stadium in Lusaka. Kapombo said of the second game, "We were not prepared to lose to Kenya; we knew that we were going to beat them by four goals like they did to us. They changed most of the players who we played with in Zambia and that made it very hard for us in the midfield which failed to click." The Kenyan coach Florence Adhiambo said of the game "We have come very far, we've been training hard and now we've seen what good training can do. We have worked hard to be here and the fans played a very important role in this victory." The leg winner was scheduled to play Tunisia in the second round. The Kenyans played Tunisian on 31 March 2012 at the Nyayo National Stadium in Tunisia. In the lead-up to the game, the team had a three-week training camp. Florence Adhiambo coached them in the game. Ksh.700, 000 was given to the team by the Kenyan Prime Minister to support their World Cup aspirations. Additional funding came from UNICEF, Procter and Gamble, and Coca-Cola.

== Background and development ==
Early development of the women's game at the time colonial powers brought football to the continent was limited as colonial powers in the region tended to take make concepts of patriarchy and women's participation in sport with them to local cultures that had similar concepts already embedded in them. The lack of later development of the national team on a wider international level symptomatic of all African teams is a result of several factors, including limited access to education, poverty amongst women in the wider society, and fundamental inequality present in the society that occasionally allows for female-specific human rights abuses. When quality female football players are developed, they tend to leave for greater opportunities abroad. Continent-wide, funding is also an issue, with most development money coming from FIFA, not the national football association. Future, success for women's football in Africa is dependent on improved facilities and access by women to these facilities. Attempting to commercialize the game and make it commercially viable is not the solution, as demonstrated by the current existence of many youth and women's football camps held throughout the continent.

Women's football gained popularity in the country during the 1990s. In 1993, this popularity led to the creation of the Kenya Women's Football Federation, which organized a national team that represented the country several times in international tournaments between its founding and 1996. In 1996, the Kenya Women's Football Federation folded under pressure from FIFA, and women's football was subsumed by the Kenya Football Federation, with women being represented in the organization as a subcommittee. Football is the fourth most popular sport for women in the country, trailing behind volley, basketball and field hockey. In 1999, a woman referee from Kenya officiated a match between the Nigerian and South African women's teams in Johannesburg and was treated poorly by fans when she failed to call offsides. The game was delayed because of the ensuring violence, which included bricks being tossed at her. In 2006, there were 7,776 registered female football players of which 5,418 were registered, under-18 youth players and 2,358 were registered adult players. This followed a pattern of increased registration of female football players in the country with 4,915 total registered players in 2000, 5,000 in 2001, 5,500 in 2002, 6,000 in 2003, 6,700 in 2004, and 7,100 in 2005. In 2006, there were 710 total football teams in the country, with 690 being mixed-gender teams and 20 being women-only. In 2006, over 3,000 girls were playing in seven different leagues around the country. Rights to broadcast the 2011 Women's World Cup in the country were bought by the African Union of Broadcasting.

Kenya Football Federation was created and joined FIFA in 1960. Their kit includes red, green and white shirts, black shorts and black socks. The federation does not have a full-time dedicated employee working on women's football. Women's football is represented on the federation by specific constitutional mandate. FIFA suspended Kenya from all football activities for three months in 2004, due to the interference of the government in football activities. The ban was reversed after the country agreed to create new statutes. On October 25, 2006, Kenya was suspended again from international football for failing to fulfill a January 2006 agreement made to resolve recurrent problems in their football federation. FIFA announced that the suspension would be in force until the federation complies with the agreements previously reached. Rachel Kamweru is the Kenyan women football national chairperson. COSAFA and FIFA reaffirmed a commitment to women's football in the East African countries of Kenya, Ethiopia, Uganda and Tanzania in 2010.

== Results and fixtures ==
The following is a list of match results in the last 12 months, as well as any future matches that have been scheduled.

Legend

Win Draw Loss Fixture

=== 2026 ===
7 February 2026 World Cup Q	Kenya	1–0	Tanzania	Nairobi
15:00 UTC+3	Mideva 84'	Report		Stadium: Ulinzi Sports Complex; Referee: Vistoria Shangula (Namibia)

14 February 2026 World Cup Q	Tanzania	1–0 (3–1 p)	Kenya	Dar es Salaam
16:00 UTC+3	Gerald 70' (pen.)	Report		Stadium: Azam Complex Stadium
	Penalties
	Penalty scored Penalty missed		Penalty missed Penalty scored

== Competitive record ==
Champions Runners-up Third place Fourth place

- Red border color indicates tournament was held on home soil.

=== FIFA U-20 Women's World Cup ===
FIFA U-20 Women's World Cup
Year	Result	Position	Pld	W	D	L	GF	GA
(Canada) 2002	Did not qualify							
(Thailand) 2004	Did not qualify							
(Russia) 2006	Did not qualify							
(Chile) 2008	Did not qualify							
(Germany) 2010	Did not qualify							
(Japan) 2012	Did not qualify							
(Canada) 2014	Did not qualify							
(Papua New Guinea) 2016	Did not qualify							
(France) 2018	Did not qualify							
(Costa Rica) 2022	Did not qualify							
(Colombia) 2024	Did not qualify							
(Poland) 2026	Did not qualify							
Total		0/12						
