= Liberia women's national under-20 football team =

Women's national under-20 football team representing Liberia

Liberia U-20 Women
- Association: Liberia Football Association
- Confederation: CAF (Africa)
- Head coach: Famatta Dean
- FIFA code: LBR
First colours	Second colours	Third colours

Biggest win
- Sierra Leone 0–7 Liberia (May 23, 2024; Thiès, Senegal); Liberia 7–0 Mauritania (May 25, 2024; Thiès, Senegal)

Biggest defeat
- Nigeria 9–1 Liberia (May 13, 2006; Abuja, Nigeria)

WAFU Zone A U-20 Women's Tournament
- Appearances: 2 (first in 2024)
- Best result: (bronze) Third place (2024)
Medal record
WAFU Zone A U-20 Women's Tournament
Bronze medal – third place	Senegal 2024	Team

The Liberia women's national under-20 football team is a youth football side governed by the Liberia Football Association (LFA). Its main objective is to develop players for progression to the senior women's national team. The team participates in various regional and continental competitions, including the WAFU Zone A U-20 Women's Tournament and the African qualifiers for the FIFA U-20 Women's World Cup.

== History ==
=== Early development ===
Liberia began its women's under-20 programme as early as 2006, prior to officially entering the 2006 African U-20 Women's World Cup qualification. Drawn against Guinea in the preliminary round, the team advanced by walkover before facing Algeria in the first round, where they recorded a 3–2 away victory before being awarded a walkover win in the second leg. In the pre-final round, Liberia held Africa's sole representative at the FIFA U-20 Women's World Cup in its first two editions, Nigeria, to a 1–1 draw at home before suffering a 1–9 defeat in the return leg in Abuja. The team then went on a decade-long absence from international competition.

They returned in 2015 for the 2016 qualifiers, earning a walkover against Sierra Leone in the preliminary round before once again being eliminated by Nigeria, losing 14–1 on aggregate. Liberia missed the following edition in 2018 but returned for the 2021 qualifiers in 2020, winning the first leg 3–0 before losing the second 4–5. They advanced to the first round to face Cameroon, though the competition was ultimately cancelled due to the COVID-19 pandemic.

=== Competitive rise ===
With the establishment of the WAFU Zone A U-20 Women's Tournament in 2023, Liberia, despite missing the inaugural edition, the team made its debut in the second edition with a young squad strengthened by increased investment in women's football and domestic youth development.

In Senegal, Liberia opened with a 2–0 victory over previous runners-up Guinea, followed by dominant 7–0 wins against both Sierra Leone and Mauritania, establishing themselves as one of the tournament favourites. They were eliminated in the semi-finals by Guinea-Bissau on penalties, but recovered to secure the bronze medal after defeating Guinea 3–2 on penalties.

== Competitive record ==
=== FIFA U-20 Women's World Cup ===
FIFA U-20 Women's World Cup record										Qualification record						
Host nation(s) and year	Round	Pos	Pld	W	D	L	GF	GA	Squad	Round	Pld	W	D	L	GF	GA
(Canada) 2002	Did not enter									Did not enter						
(Thailand) 2004	Did not enter									Did not enter						
(Russia) 2006	Did not qualify									Third round	6 (Note: Liberia's 2006 campaign is recorded as six matches, though only three took place, following Guinea's withdrawal in the first round and Algeria's forfeiture of the second leg in the second.)	4	1	1	14	12
(Chile) 2008	Did not enter									Did not enter						
(Germany) 2010	Did not enter									Did not enter						
(Japan) 2012	Did not enter									Did not enter						
(Canada) 2014	Did not enter									Did not enter						
(Papua New Guinea) 2016	Did not qualify									First round	4 (Note: Liberia's 2016 campaign is recorded as four matches, though only two took place, following Sierra Leone's withdrawal from the preliminary round)	2	0	2	7	14
(France) 2018	Did not enter									Did not enter						
(Costa Rica) (Panama) 2021	Cancelled									First round (Note: Round reached before the cancellation of the finals; only the preliminary round was played, and the team qualified for the first round.)	2	1	0	1	7	5
(Costa Rica) 2022	Did not enter									Did not enter						
(Colombia) 2024	Did not enter									Did not enter						
(Poland) 2026	Did not enter									Did not enter						
Total		0/12	—	—	—	—	—	—		Third round	12	7	1	4	28	31

=== WAFU Zone A U-20 Women's Tournament ===
WAFU Zone A U-20 Women's Tournament record
Host nation(s) and year	Round	Pos	Pld	W	D	L	GF	GA	Squad
(Sierra Leone) 2023	Did not enter								
(Senegal) 2024	Third place		5	3	2	0	17	1	Squad
(Guinea-Bissau) 2026	On going								Squad
Total	Third place!!Best result	2/3	5	3	2	17	1		

== Players ==
=== Current squad ===
The following 20 players were named to the squad for the 2026 WAFU A Zonal U-20 Women's Tournament, held from 5 to 7 May 2026.

No.	Pos.	Player	Date of birth (age)	Club
1	GK	Makula Konneh	August 2, 2007 (age 18)	(Liberia Football Association) Ravia Angels
16	GK	Grace Young	July 20, 2008 (age 17)	(Liberia Football Association) Bushrod Queens
4	DF	Angel Brown	February 22, 2008 (age 18)	(Liberia Football Association) World Girls
12	DF	Hawa Diggs		(Liberia Football Association) Rover Ladies
13	DF	Princess Hill		(Liberia Football Association) Real Muja
15	DF	Serena Zarwolo	June 15, 2007 (age 19)	(Liberia Football Association) World Girls
18	DF	Yatta Jaleibah	February 7, 2009 (age 17)	(Liberia Football Association) Real Muja
20	DF	Grace Kamara	September 12, 2006 (age 19)	(Liberia Football Association) Senior Female PRO
2	MF	Patience Konah	April 30, 2008 (age 18)	(Liberia Football Association) Ravia Angels
6	MF	Wonder Juery	November 8, 2007 (age 18)	(Liberia Football Association) World Girls
8	MF	Louise Brown (Captain)	May 13, 2007 (age 19)	(Liberia Football Association) Determine Girls
17	MF	Bendu Yantay	December 24, 2007 (age 18)	(Liberia Football Association) Determine Girls
19	MF	Rachel Carlor		(Liberia Football Association) Small Town Academy
3	FW	Janies Dunbar		(Liberia Football Association) Senior Female PRO
5	FW	Kennle Paasewe	May 12, 2008 (age 18)	(Liberia Football Association) Senior Female PRO
7	FW	Dalphine Glao	January 9, 2008 (age 18)	(Liberia Football Association) Determine Girls
9	FW	Yassah Gwaikolo		(Liberia Football Association) Dolakeh
10	FW	Makasian Saryon	November 21, 2007 (age 18)	(Liberia Football Association) Ravia Angels
11	FW	Olive Nyumah	June 5, 2007 (age 19)	(Liberia Football Association) Real Muja
14	FW	Gloria Karyah		(Liberia Football Association) Small Town Academy
