= Gambia women's national under-20 football team =

Gambia Under-20
- Nickname: The Scorpions
- Association: Gambia Football Federation (GFF)
- Confederation: CAF (Africa)
- Sub-confederation: WAFU (West Africa)
- FIFA code: GAM
First colours	Second colours

African U-20 World Cup qualification
- Appearances: 1 (first in 2022)
- Best result: Round 3 (2022)

FIFA U-20 Women's World Cup
- Appearances: None

The Gambia women's national under-20 football team represents Gambia in international youth women's football competitions. Its primary role is the development of players in preparation for the senior Gambia women's national football team. The team competes in a variety of competitions, including the biennial African U-20 Women's World Cup qualification, which is the top competitions for this age group.

== Competitive record ==
=== FIFA U-20 Women's World Cup record ===
FIFA U-20 Women's World Cup
Year	Result	Matches	Wins	Draws*	Losses	GF	GA
(Canada) 2002	Did not qualify						
(Thailand) 2004	Did not qualify						
(Russia) 2006	Did not qualify						
(Chile) 2008	Did not qualify						
(Germany) 2010	Did not qualify						
(Japan) 2012	Did not qualify						
(Canada) 2014	Did not qualify						
(Papua New Guinea) 2016	Did not qualify						
(France) 2018	Did not qualify						
(Costa Rica) 2022	Did not qualify						
(Colombia) 2024	Did not qualify						
(Poland) 2026	To be determined						
Total	0/12	0	0	0	0	0	0

== See also ==
- Gambia women's national football team
- Gambia women's national under-17 football team
