= West African Football Union =

Sub-regional football governing body in West Africa

West African Football Union; Union des Fédérations Ouest-Africaines de Football; União das Federações Oeste Africanas
- Logo used between 2017 and 2020

- Zone A Zone B
- Formation: 1975; 51 years ago
- Type: Sports governing body; Football administration
- Region served: West Africa
- Members: 9 members (Zone A): Cape Verde; Gambia; Guinea; Guinea-Bissau; Liberia; Mauritania; Mali; Senegal; Sierra Leone; 7 members (Zone B): Benin; Burkina Faso; Ghana; Ivory Coast; Niger; Nigeria; Togo
- Official language: English, French and Portuguese
- Affiliations: CAF, FIFA
- Website: WAFU Zone A; WAFU Zone B

The West African Football Union (French: Union des Fédérations Ouest-Africaines de Football; Portuguese: União das Federações Oeste Africanas), also known by its acronyms WAFU and UFOA, is a regional subconfederation affiliated with CAF and the governing body for football in West Africa. Established in 1975, it is divided into two subregional zones (Zone A and Zone B).

The WAFU/UFOA organizes regional competitions for national teams, its premier men's competition was the WAFU Nations Cup. The WAFU Zone A Women's Cup and the WAFU Zone B Women's Cup are the premier women's competitions.

== Presidents ==
- (Ghana) K. Tandoh (1975–1977)
- (Togo) Seyi Memene (1977–1984)
- (Senegal) Abdoulaye Fofana (1984–1988)
- (Nigeria) Jonathan Boytie Ogufere (1988–1994)
- (Ivory Coast) Dieng Ousseynou (1994–1999)
- (Nigeria) Abdulmumini Aminu (1999–2002)
- (Senegal) El Hadji Malick Sy (2002–2004)
- (Ivory Coast) Jacques Anouma (2004–2008)
- (Nigeria) Amos Adamu (2008–2010)
- (Ghana) Kwesi Nyantakyi (2011–2018)
- (Ghana) Kurt Okraku (2019–present)

== Member associations ==
WAFU consists of all football associations of West Africa, but is split into two zones by CAF, who cited "organisational issues facing WAFU."

=== Zone A ===
Country	Governing body
Cape Verde	Cape Verdean Football Federation
Gambia	Gambia Football Association
Guinea	Guinean Football Federation
Guinea-Bissau	Football Federation of Guinea-Bissau
Liberia	Liberia Football Association
Mali	Malian Football Federation
Mauritania	Football Federation of the Islamic Republic of Mauritania
Senegal	Senegalese Football Federation
Sierra Leone	Sierra Leone Football Association

=== Zone B ===
Country	Governing body
Benin	Benin Football Federation
Burkina Faso	Burkinabé Football Federation
Ghana	Ghana Football Association
Ivory Coast	Ivorian Football Federation
Niger	Nigerien Football Federation
Nigeria	Nigeria Football Federation
Togo	Togolese Football Federation

== Competitions ==
WAFU runs main and qualifying competitions covering men, women and youth.

=== Current title holders ===
Competition	Year	Champions	Rank/Score	Runners-up	Next edition	Most titles
National teams (men)
WAFU Nations Cup	2019	Senegal	1st	Ghana	TBD	Ghana (2)
Zone A U-20 Championship	2024	Senegal	3rd	Sierra Leone	2026	Senegal (3)
Zone B U-20 Championship	2026	Burkina Faso	1st	Nigeria	2028	Nigeria (2)
Zone A U-17 Championship	2025	Senegal	4th	Mali	2026	Senegal (4)
Zone B U-17 Championship	2026	Niger		Ivory Coast	2027	Nigeria (2) Ivory Coast (2)
Zone A U-15 Championship	2022	Senegal	3–0	Liberia	TBD	
Zone A Schools Championship	2022	(Guinea) CS Ben Sekou Sylla	1st	(The Gambia) New Yundum	TBD	
Zone B Schools Championship	2022	(Benin) CEG Sainte Rita	1st	(Ivory Coast) CS Venus Saioua	TBD	
WAFU Zone A Beach Soccer					TBD	
National teams (women)
Zone A Women's Cup	2025	Sierra Leone	1st	Senegal	TBD	Senegal (2)
Zone B Women's Cup	2019	Nigeria	1st	Ivory Coast	TBD	Ghana (1) Nigeria (1)
WAFU Zone A U20 Women's Cup	2026	Senegal	3rd	Liberia	TBD	Senegal (3)
WAFU Zone A U-17 Girls Tournament	2025	Sierra Leone	1st	Senegal	TBD	Sierra Leone (1)
WAFU Zone B U20 Women's Cup	2025	Nigeria	1st	Ghana	TBD	Ghana (1) Nigeria (1)
WAFU Zone B U-17 Girls Cup	2026	Nigeria	1st	Ghana	2028	Ghana (1) Nigeria (1)
Zone A Girls Schools Championship	2022	(The Gambia) Scan Aid	1st	(Guinea-Bissau) Ecole Congresso De Cassaca	TBD	
Zone B Girls Schools Championship	2022	(Benin) CEG Colby	1st	(Burkina Faso) Ecole Chanvigny B	TBD	
Clubs (women)
CAF Women's Champions League Qualifiers (Zone A)	2025	(Mali) USFAS Bamako	1–0	(Senegal) Aigles de la Médina	2027	(Mali) AS Mandé (women) (2) (Mali) USFAS Bamako (women) (2)
CAF Women's Champions League Qualifiers (Zone B)	2026	(Nigeria) Edo Queens	2–2 (4–1 p)	(Ghana) Ampem Darkoa Ladies	2027	(Nigeria) Edo Queens (2)

=== Defunct competitions ===
Competition	Duration
CEDEAO Cup	1977–1991
West African Club Championship	1977–2011
Amílcar Cabral Cup	1979–2007
West African Nations Cup	1982–1987
UEMOA Tournament	2007–2016
WAFU U20 Women's Cup	Proposed for 2022 but never happened

== Major tournament records ==
Legend

- 1st – Champions
- 2nd – Runners-up
- 3rd – Third place
- 4th – Fourth place
- QF – Quarter-finals (1934–1938, 1954–1970, and 1986–present: knockout round of 8)
- R3 — Round 3 (2026–present: knockout round of 16)
- R2 — Round 2 (1974–1978: second group stage, top 8; 1982: second group stage, top 12; 1986–2022: knockout round of 16; 2026–present: knockout round of 32)
- R1 — Round 1 (1930, 1950–1970 and 1986–present: group stage; 1934–1938: knockout round of 16; 1974–1982: first group stage)
- Q — Qualified for upcoming tournament
- •• – Qualified but withdrew
- • – Did not qualify
- × – Did not enter / Withdrew / Banned
- – Hosts
- – Not affiliated in FIFA

For each tournament, the flag of the host country and the number of teams in each finals tournament (in brackets) are shown.

=== FIFA World Cup ===
FIFA World Cup record
Team	1930 (Uruguay) (13)	1934 (Italy) (16)	1938 (France) (15)	1950 (Brazil) (13)	1954 (Switzerland) (16)	1958 (Sweden) (16)	1962 (Chile) (16)	1966 (England) (16)	1970 (Mexico) (16)	1974 (West Germany) (16)	1978 (Argentina) (16)	1982 (Spain) (24)	1986 (Mexico) (24)	1990 (Italy) (24)	1994 (United States) (24)	1998 (France) (32)	2002 (Japan) (South Korea) (32)	2006 (Germany) (32)	2010 (South Africa) (32)	2014 (Brazil) (32)	2018 (Russia) (32)	2022 (Qatar) (32)	2026 (Canada) (Mexico) (United States) (48)	2030 (Morocco) (Portugal) (Spain) (48)	2034 (Saudi Arabia) (48)	Apps.
Zone A Members
Cape Verde	Part of Portugal												×	×	×	×	•	•	•	•	•	•	R2; 32nd			1/7
Senegal	Part of France						×	×	•	•	•	•	•	×	•	•	QF; 7th	•	•	•	R1; 17th	R2; 10th	R2; 31st			4/13
Zone B Members
Ivory Coast	Part of France						×	×	×	•	•	×	•	•	•	•	•	R1; 19th	R1; 17th	R1; 21st	•	•	R2; 19th			4/12
Ghana	Part of the United Kingdom					×	•	×	•	•	•	×	•	•	•	•	•	R2; 13th	QF; 7th	R1; 25th	•	R1; 24th	R2; 24th			5/15
Nigeria	Part of the United Kingdom						•	×	•	•	•	•	•	•	R2; 9th	R2; 12th	R1; 27th	•	R1; 27th	R2; 16th	R1; 21st	•	•			6/16
Togo	Part of France						×	×	×	•	•	•	×	×	•	•	•	R1; 30th	•	•	•	•	•			1/11
Total (6 teams)	0	0	0	0	0	0	0	0	0	0	0	0	0	0	1	1	2	3	3	3	2	2	3	TBD	TBD	21

=== FIFA Women's World Cup ===
FIFA Women's World Cup record
Team	1991 (China) (12)	1995 (Sweden) (12)	1999 (United States) (16)	2003 (United States) (16)	2007 (China) (16)	2011 (Germany) (16)	2015 (Canada) (24)	2019 (France) (24)	2023 (Australia) (New Zealand) (32)	2027 (Brazil) (32)	Apps.
Zone B Members
Ghana	•	•	R1; T-13th	R1; 12th	R1; 15th	•	•	•	•		3/9
Ivory Coast	×	×	×	•	•	•	R1; 23rd	•	•	•	1/7
Nigeria	R1; 10th	R1; 11th	QF; 7th	R1; 15th	R1; 13th	R1; 9th	R1; 21st	R2; 16th	R2; 10th	•	9/10
Total (3 teams)	1	1	2	2	2	1	2	1	1		13

=== Olympic Games ===
==== Men's tournament ====
Olympic Games (Men's tournament) record
Team	1900 (France) (3)	1904 (United States) (3)	1908 (United Kingdom) (6)	1912 (Sweden) (11)	1920 (Belgium) (14)	1924 (France) (22)	1928 (Netherlands) (17)	1936 (Germany) (16)	1948 (United Kingdom) (18)	1952 (Finland) (25)	1956 (Australia) (11)	1960 (Italy) (16)	1964 (Japan) (14)	1968 (Mexico) (16)	1972 (West Germany) (16)	1976 (Canada) (13)	1980 (Soviet Union) (16)	1984 (United States) (16)	1988 (South Korea) (16)	1992 (Spain) (16)	1996 (United States) (16)	2000 (Australia) (16)	2004 (Greece) (16)	2008 (China) (16)	2012 (United Kingdom) (16)	2016 (Brazil) (16)	2020 (Japan) (16)	2024 (France) (16)	2028 (United States) (12)	Apps.
Zone A Members
Guinea	Part of France													11			–	–	–	–	–	–	–	–	–	–	–	16		2
Mali	Part of France												–	–	–		–	–	–	–	–	–	5	–	–	–	–	14		2
Senegal	Part of France												–	–	–	–	–	–	–	–	–	–	–	–	6	–	–	–		1
Zone B Members
Ivory Coast	Part of France												–	–	–	–		–	–	–	–	–	–	6	–		7	–		2
Ghana	Part of the United Kingdom									–		–	7	12	16			–	–	3	8	–	9	–	–	–	–	–		6
Nigeria					Part of the United Kingdom					–	–	–	–	14	–		13	–	15	–	1	8	–	2	–	3	–	–		7
Total (6 teams)		0	0	0	0	0	0	0	0	0	0	0	1	3	1	0	1	0	1	1	2	1	2	2	1	1	1	2		20

==== Women's tournament ====
Olympic Games (Women's tournament) record
Team	1996 (United States) (8)	2000 (Australia) (8)	2004 (Greece) (10)	2008 (China) (12)	2012 (United Kingdom) (12)	2016 (Brazil) (12)	2020 (Japan) (12)	2024 (France) (12)	2028 (United States) (16)	Apps.
Nigeria	–	8	6	11	–	–	–	11		4
Total (1 team)	0	1	1	1	0	0	0	1	TBD	4

=== Africa Cup of Nations ===
Team	(Sudan) 1957 (3)	(United Arab Republic) 1959 (3)	(Ethiopia) 1962 (4)	(Ghana) 1963 (6)	(Tunisia) 1965 (6)	(Ethiopia) 1968 (8)	(Sudan) 1970 (8)	(Cameroon) 1972 (8)	(Egypt) 1974 (8)	(Ethiopia) 1976 (8)	(Ghana) 1978 (8)	(Nigeria) 1980 (8)	(Libya) 1982 (8)	(Ivory Coast) 1984 (8)	(Egypt) 1986 (8)	(Morocco) 1988 (8)	(Algeria) 1990 (8)	(Senegal) 1992 (12)	(Tunisia) 1994 (12)	(South Africa) 1996 (15)	(Burkina Faso) 1998 (16)	(Ghana) (Nigeria) 2000 (16)	(Mali) 2002 (16)	(Tunisia) 2004 (16)	(Egypt) 2006 (16)	(Ghana) 2008 (16)	(Angola) 2010 (15)	(Equatorial Guinea) (Gabon) 2012 (16)	(South Africa) 2013 (16)	(Equatorial Guinea) 2015 (16)	(Gabon) 2017 (16)	(Egypt) 2019 (24)	(Cameroon) 2021 (24)	(Ivory Coast) 2023 (24)	(Morocco) 2025 (24)	(Kenya) (Tanzania) (Uganda) 2027 (24)	Apps.
Zone A Members
Cape Verde	Part of Portugal																		•	×		•	•	•	•	•	•	•	QF	GS	•	•	R16	QF	•		4
Gambia	Part of the United Kingdom					×	×	×	×	•	×	•	•	•	•	•	×	•	×	×	×	×	•	•	•	•	•	•	•	×	•	•	QF	GS	•		2
Guinea	FRA			••	•	•	GS	•	GS	2nd	•	GS	•	•	•	•	•	•	GS	•	GS	•	×	QF	QF	QF	•	GS	•	QF	•	R16	R16	QF	•		14
Guinea-Bissau	Part of Portugal															×	×	×	•	×	×	×	×	×	•	×	•	•	•	•	GS	GS	GS	GS	•		4
Liberia				×	×	•	×	×	×	•	×	×	•	×	•	•	•	×	•	GS	•	•	GS	•	•	•	•	•	•	•	•	•	•	•	•		2
Mali	Part of France				•	•	•	2nd	•	•	•	•	•	•	•	•	•	•	4th	•	•	•	4th	4th	•	GS	GS	3rd	3rd	GS	GS	R16	R16	QF	QF		14
Mauritania										×	×	•	•	×	•	×	×	•	×	•	•	×	•	•	•	•	•	×	×	•	•	GS	GS	R16	•		3
Senegal	Part of France				4th	GS	•	•	•	•	•	×	•	•	GS	•	4th	QF	QF	•	•	QF	2nd	QF	4th	GS	•	GS	•	GS	QF	2nd	1st	R16	2nd		18
Sierra Leone	Part of the UK					×	×	×	•	×	•	×	•	•	×	•	×	•	GS	GS	×	×	•	•	•	•	•	•	•	•	•	×	GS	•	•		3
Zone B Members
Benin	Part of France				×	×	×	•	×	×	×	•	×	•	•	•	•	•	•	×	•	•	•	GS	•	GS	GS	•	•	•	•	QF	•	•	R16		5
Burkina Faso	Part of France				×	•	×	×	•	×	GS	×	•	×	×	×	•	•	×	GS	4th	GS	GS	GS	•	•	GS	GS	2nd	GS	3rd	•	4th	R16	R16		14
Ghana	UK		•	1st	1st	2nd	2nd	•	•	•	1st	GS	1st	GS	•	•	•	2nd	QF	4th	GS	QF	QF	•	GS	3rd	2nd	4th	4th	2nd	4th	R16	GS	GS	•		24
Ivory Coast	Part of France				3rd	3rd	4th	•	GS	•	••	GS	×	GS	3rd	GS	GS	1st	3rd	GS	QF	GS	GS	•	2nd	4th	QF	2nd	QF	1st	GS	QF	R16	1st	QF		26
Niger	Part of France					×	•	•	×	•	×	×	×	•	×	×	×	•	•	×	×	•	•	•	•	•	•	GS	GS	•	•	•	•	•	•		2
Nigeria			×	GS	×	•	×	•	•	3rd	3rd	1st	GS	2nd	•	2nd	2nd	3rd	1st	••	×	2nd	3rd	3rd	3rd	QF	3rd	•	1st	•	•	3rd	R16	2nd	3rd		21
Togo	Part of France				×	•	•	GS	×	•	•	•	•	GS	•	•	×	•	×	•	GS	GS	GS	•	GS	•	••	•	QF	•	GS	•	•	•	•		8
Total (15 teams)	0	0	0	2	3	3	3	2	2	2	3	4	2	4	2	2	3	4	7	5	5	6	8	6	6	7	6	7	8	7	7	8	11	10	6	TBD	161

=== Women's Africa Cup of Nations ===
Women's Africa Cup of Nations record
Team	1991 (4)	1995 (6)	1998 (Nigeria) (7)	2000 (South Africa) (8)	2002 (Nigeria) (8)	2004 (South Africa) (8)	2006 (Nigeria) (8)	2008 (Equatorial Guinea) (8)	2010 (South Africa) (8)	2012 (Equatorial Guinea) (8)	2014 (Namibia) (8)	2016 (Cameroon) (8)	2018 (Ghana) (8)	2022 (Morocco) (12)	2024 (Morocco) (12)	2026 (Morocco) (16)	Apps.
Zone A Members
Cape Verde														×	•	GS	1
Guinea	SF	×	•	×	×	•	•	•	•	•	×	•	×	•	•	•	1
Mali					R1	R1	R1	R1	R1	•	•	R1	4th	•	QF	GS	9
Senegal	••	×	×	×	•	•	•	•	•	R1	•	•	•	QF	QF	GS	4
Sierra Leone	×	QF	×	×	×	×	×	×	•	×	×	×	×	•	×	•	1
Zone B Members
Burkina Faso								×	×	×	•	•	•	R1	•	GS	2
Ghana	QF	SF	2nd	3rd	2nd	3rd	2nd	R1	R1	•	R1	3rd	R1	•	3rd	QF	14
Ivory Coast	×	×	×	×	•	×	•	•	•	R1	3rd	•	•	•	•	QF	3
Nigeria	1st	1st	1st	1st	1st	1st	1st	3rd	1st	4th	1st	1st	1st	4th	1st	QF	16
Togo							•	×	×	×	×	×	×	R1	•	•	1
Total (10 teams)	3	3	2	2	3	3	3	3	3	3	3	3	3	4	4	7	52

=== FIFA U-20 World Cup ===
FIFA U-20 World Cup record
Team	1977 (Tunisia) (16)	1979 (Japan) (16)	1981 (Australia) (16)	1983 (Mexico) (16)	1985 (Soviet Union) (16)	1987 (Chile) (16)	1989 (Saudi Arabia) (16)	1991 (Portugal) (16)	1993 (Australia) (16)	1995 (Qatar) (16)	1997 (Malaysia) (24)	1999 (Nigeria) (24)	2001 (Argentina) (24)	2003 (United Arab Emirates) (24)	2005 (Netherlands) (24)	2007 (Canada) (24)	2009 (Egypt) (24)	2011 (Colombia) (24)	2013 (Turkey) (24)	2015 (New Zealand) (24)	2017 (South Korea) (24)	2019 (Poland) (24)	2023 (Argentina) (24)	2025 (Chile) (24)	2027 (Azerbaijan) (Uzbekistan) (24)	Apps.
Zone A Members
Gambia	×	×	×	•	•	×	×	•	×	×	×	×	•	×	•	R2	•	•	•	•	•	•	R2	•		2
Guinea	•	R1	•	•	•	•	•	•	×	•	•	•	×	•	•	•	•	•	•	•	R1	•	•	•		2
Mali	×	×	×	×	×	×	R1	•	•	•	•	3rd	•	R1	•	•	•	R1	R1	3rd	•	QF	•	•		7
Senegal	×	×	×	•	×	×	•	•	•	•	•	•	•	•	•	•	•	•	•	4th	R2	QF	R1	•		4
Zone B Members
Benin	×	×	×	×	×	×	×	•	×	×	•	×	×	×	R1	×	•	•	•	•	×	•	•	•		1
Burkina Faso	×	×	×	×	×	×	×	×	×	•	•	×	•	R2	•	•	•	•	•	•	•	•	•	•		1
Ghana	×	×	×	×	•	•	•	•	2nd	•	4th	QF	2nd	•	•	•	1st	•	3rd	R2	•	•	•	•		7
Ivory Coast	R1	×	×	R1	•	•	•	R1	×	•	R1	•	•	R2	•	•	•	•	•	•	•	•	•	•		5
Nigeria	×	•	•	R1	3rd	R1	2nd	•	•	•	•	QF	•	•	2nd	QF	R2	QF	R2	R2	•	R2	QF	R2		14
Togo	×	×	•	•	×	R1	×	×	•	•	×	•	×	•	×	•	×	•	×	•	×	•	•	•		1
Total (10 teams)	1	1	0	2	1	2	2	1	1	0	2	3	1	3	2	2	2	2	3	4	2	3	3	1	TBD	44

=== FIFA U-20 Women's World Cup ===
FIFA U-20 Women's World Cup record
Team	2002 (Canada) (12)	2004 (Thailand) (12)	2006 (Russia) (16)	2008 (Chile) (16)	2010 (Germany) (16)	2012 (Japan) (16)	2014 (Canada) (16)	2016 (Papua New Guinea) (16)	2018 (France) (16)	2022 (Costa Rica) (16) (Note: Costa Rica and Panama were originally due to host the 2020 FIFA U-20 Women's World Cup, but the latter withdrew citing the COVID-19 pandemic and left Costa Rica as the sole hosts. FIFA postponed the 2020 edition to the following year, i.e. 2021, pending improvement in pandemic management, but cancelled it altogether on 17 November 2020 due to the escalation of the pandemic caused by the discovery of the COVID-19 Omicron variant a month earlier and automatically awarded them the 2022 edition.)	2024 (Colombia) (24)	2026 (Poland) (24)	Apps.
Zone B Members
Benin	•	•	•	•	•	•	•	•	•	•	•	R1	1
Ghana	×	×	•	•	R1	R1	R1	R1	R1	R1	R1	R1	8
Nigeria	R1	QF	QF	QF	2nd	4th	2nd	R1	QF	QF	R2	QF	12
Total (3 teams)	1	1	1	1	2	2	2	2	2	2	2	3	26

=== FIFA U-17 World Cup ===
FIFA U-17 World Cup record
Team	1985 (China) (16)	1987 (Canada) (16)	1989 (Scotland) (16)	1991 (Italy) (16)	1993 (Japan) (16)	1995 (Ecuador) (16)	1997 (Egypt) (16)	1999 (New Zealand) (16)	2001 (Trinidad and Tobago) (16)	2003 (Finland) (16)	2005 (Peru) (16)	2007 (South Korea) (24)	2009 (Nigeria) (24)	2011 (Mexico) (24)	2013 (United Arab Emirates) (24)	2015 (Chile) (24)	2017 (India) (24)	2019 (Brazil) (24) (Note: Original hosts Peru were stripped of the rights to host the 2019 edition in February that year.)	2023 (Indonesia) (24) (Note: Peru was originally due to host the 2021 FIFA U-17 World Cup but FIFA cancelled it on 24 December 2020 citing the COVID-19 pandemic and its escalation of the pandemic caused by the discovery of the COVID-19 Omicron variant a month earlier as the reasons and automatically awarded them the 2023 edition. Peru later withrew as hosts on 2 May 2023 due to infrastructural defects and FIFA awarded the hosting eights to Indonesia, whom FIFA earlier stripped the hosting rights for the year's FIFA U-20 World Cup.)	2025 (Qatar) (48)	2026 (Qatar) (48)	Apps.
Zone A Members
Gambia	•	•	•	•	•	•	•	•	•	•	R1	•	R1	•	•	•	•	•	×	•	•	2
Guinea	4th	•	R1	•	•	R1	•	•	•	•	•	•	•	•	•	R1	R1	×	×	×	•	6
Mali	•	•	•	•	•	•	QF	R1	QF	•	•	•	•	•	•	2nd	4th	•	3rd	R3	Q	8
Senegal	•	•	•	•	•	•	•	•	•	•	•	•	•	•	•	•	•	R2	R2	R2	Q	4
Sierra Leone	•	•	•	•	•	•	•	•	•	R1	•	•	•	•	•	•	•	•	•	•	•	1
Zone B Members
Burkina Faso	•	•	•	•	•	•	•	R1	3rd	•	•	•	R2	R1	•	•	•	•	R1	QF	•	6
Ghana	•	•	R1	1st	2nd	1st	2nd	3rd	•	•	R1	4th	•	•	•	•	QF	•	•	•		9
Ivory Coast	•	3rd	•	•	•	•	•	•	•	•	R1	•	•	R2	QF	•	•	•	•	R1	Q	6
Niger	•	•	•	•	•	•	•	•	•	•	•	•	•	•	•	•	R2	•	•	•	•	1
Nigeria	1st	2nd	QF	•	1st	QF	•	•	2nd	R1	•	1st	2nd	•	1st	1st	•	R2	•	•	•	12
Togo	•	•	•	•	•	•	•	•	•	•	•	R1	•	•	•	•	•	•	•	•	•	1
Total (11 teams)	2	2	3	1	2	3	2	3	3	2	3	3	3	2	2	3	4	2	3	4	3	56

=== FIFA U-17 Women's World Cup ===
FIFA U-17 Women's World Cup record
Team	2008 (New Zealand) (16)	2010 (Trinidad and Tobago) (16)	2012 (Azerbaijan) (16)	2014 (Costa Rica) (16)	2016 (Jordan) (16)	2018 (Uruguay) (16)	2022 (India) (16) (Note: India were originally due to host the 2020 FIFA U-17 Women's World Cup, but it was postponed to the following year, i.e. 2021, due to the COVID-19 pandemic by FIFA, who eventually cancelled it on 17 November 2020 and rather automatically awarded them the 2022 edition.)	2024 (Dominican Republic) (16)	2025 (Morocco) (24)	2026 (Morocco) (24)	2027 (Morocco) (24)	2028 (Morocco) (24)	2029 (Morocco) (24)	Apps.
Zone BA Members
Gambia	×	×	R1	×	×	•	×	×	×	×				1
Zone B Members
Ghana	R1	R1	3rd	QF	QF	QF	•	×	×	QF				7
Ivory Coast	×	×	×	×	×	×	×	×	R1	•				1
Nigeria	R1	QF	QF	QF	R1	•	3rd	QF	R2	1st				9
Total (4 teams)	2	2	3	2	2	1	1	1	2	2	TBD	TBD	TBD	18

=== FIFA Futsal World Cup ===
FIFA Futsal World Cup record
Team	1989 (Netherlands) (16)	1992 (Hong Kong) (16)	1996 (Spain) (16)	2000 (Guatemala) (16)	2004 (Taiwan) (16)	2008 (Brazil) (20)	2012 (Thailand) (24)	2016 (Colombia) (24)	2021 (Lithuania) (24)	2024 (Uzbekistan) (24)	2028 (24)	Apps.
Nigeria	×	R1	×	×	×	•	•	•	×	×		1
Total (1 team)	0	1	0	0	0	0	0	0	0	0		1

=== FIFA Beach Soccer World Cup ===
FIFA Beach Soccer World Cup record
Team	1995 (Brazil) (8)	1996 (Brazil) (8)	1997 (Brazil) (8)	1998 (Brazil) (10)	1999 (Brazil) (12)	2000 (Brazil) (12)	2001 (Brazil) (12)	2002 (Brazil) (8)	2003 (Brazil) (8)	2004 (Brazil) (12)	2005 (Brazil) (12)	2006 (Brazil) (12)	2007 (Brazil) (16)	2008 (France) (16)	2009 (United Arab Emirates) (16)	2011 (Italy) (16)	2013 (French Polynesia) (16)	2015 (Portugal) (16)	2017 (The Bahamas) (16)	2019 (Paraguay) (16)	2021 (Russia) (16)	2024 (United Arab Emirates) (16)	2025 (Seychelles) (16)	2027 (??)	Apps.
Ivory Coast	•	•	•	•	•	•	•	•	•	•	×	•	•	•	R1; 11th	•	R1; 16th	•	•	•	•	•	•		2/23
Nigeria	•	•	•	•	•	•	•	•	•	•	×	R1; 9th	QF; 6th	•	R1; 12th	QF; 6th	•	•	R1; 12th	R1; 16th	×	•	•		6/23
Senegal	•	•	•	•	•	•	•	•	•	•	×	×	QF; 5th	R1; 9th	•	QF; 7th	R1; 13th	R1; 13th	QF; 6th	QF; 6th	4th	R1; 10th	4th		10/23
Total (3 teams)	0	0	0	0	0	0	0	0	0	0	0	1	2	1	2	2	2	1	2	2	1	1	1		18

== FIFA World Rankings ==
=== Men's national teams ===
FIFA Rankings (as of 7 October 2026)
WAFU*	FIFA	+/−	National Team	Points
1	18	Steady	Senegal	1648.84
2	29	▲2	Ivory Coast	1569.32
3	30	▼4	Nigeria	1567.97
4	47	▲6	Mali	1474.14
5	62	Steady	Burkina Faso	1407.8
6	68	▼4	Cape Verde	1373.58
7	70	▼5	Ghana	1361.27
8	82	▼1	Guinea	1296.67
9	89	▲4	Benin	1266.01
10	109	▲7	Gambia	1182.64
11	110	▲3	Mauritania	1176.05
12	111	▲3	Niger	1172.93
13	120	▼1	Togo	1153.04
14	124	▲8	Guinea-Bissau	1144.03
15	130	▼8	Sierra Leone	1123.2
16	146	▼6	Liberia	1064.58

Top-ranked men's national football teams

=== Women's national teams ===
FIFA Rankings (as of 20 October 2026)
WAFU*	FIFA	+/−	National Team	Points
1	43	▼7	Nigeria	1518.02
2	65	▼5	Ghana	1383.11
3	72	Steady	Ivory Coast	1349.27
4	76	▲3	Senegal	1310.26
5	86	▼2	Mali	1246.96
6	109	▲9	Burkina Faso	1168.21
7	121	▼1	Cape Verde	1134.71
8	133	Steady	Togo	1092.99
9	134	▲5	Benin	1089.9
10	135	▼1	Gambia	1082.47
11	145	▼2	Guinea	1048.64
12	152	Steady	Sierra Leone	1021.39
13	171	Steady	Liberia	882.37
14	174	Steady	Niger	863.94
15	176	▲1	Guinea-Bissau	838.58

Top-ranked women's national football teams

=== Futsal ===
FIFA Rankings (as of 24 September 2026)
WAFU*	FIFA	+/−	National Team	Points
1	86	▼1	Ivory Coast	957.32
2	124	Steady	Guinea	832.08
3	126	Steady	Mauritania	805.7
4	133	Steady	Cape Verde	752.03
5	134	▲1	Ghana	747.43
6	142	Steady	Senegal	673.7

FIFA Rankings (as of 24 September 2026)
WAFU*	FIFA	+/−	National Team	Points
1	81	Steady	Senegal	750.07
2	91	Steady	Guinea	692.7

=== Beach Soccer ===
BSWW Rankings (as of 2 September 2026)
WAFU*	BSWW	+/−	National Team	Points
1	7	Steady	Senegal	1306.5
2	23	Steady	Mauritania	490
3	54	▲3	Ghana	151
4	83	Steady	Nigeria	24.25
5	89	▼1	Ivory Coast	15.25

== See also ==
- UNAF
- CECAFA
- COSAFA
- UNIFFAC
- Confederation of African Football (CAF)
