= Senegal women's national under-20 football team =

National association football team

Senegal Under-20
- Nickname: Lionesses de la Téranga
- Association: Senegal Football Federation
- Confederation: CAF (Africa)
- Sub-confederation: WAFU (West Africa)
- FIFA code: SEN
First colours	Second colours

African U-20 World Cup qualification
- Appearances: 5 (first in 2006)
- Best result: Final Round (2024)

The Senegal women's national under-20 football team competes in international youth women's football tournaments. They qualified for the 2022 WAFU U20 Women's Cup, which took place in Ghana. In the African U-20 World Cup qualification, they reached the semi-finals but lost to Nigeria, who won with a 7-2 aggregate score.

== Competitive record ==
Champions Runners-up Third place Fourth place

- Red border color indicates tournament was held on home soil.

=== FIFA U-20 Women's World Cup ===
FIFA U-20 Women's World Cup
Year	Result	Position	Pld	W	D	L	GF	GA
(Canada) 2002	Did not qualify							
(Thailand) 2004	Did not qualify							
(Russia) 2006	Did not qualify							
(Chile) 2008	Did not qualify							
(Germany) 2010	Did not qualify							
(Japan) 2012	Did not qualify							
(Canada) 2014	Did not qualify							
(Papua New Guinea) 2016	Did not qualify							
(France) 2018	Did not qualify							
(Costa Rica) 2022	Did not qualify							
(Colombia) 2024	Did not qualify							
(Poland) 2026	To be determined							
Total		0/12						

=== African U-20 Women's World Cup qualification ===
African U-20 Women's World Cup qualification
Appearances: 2
Year	Round	Pld	W	D	L	GF	GA
2002	Did not enter						
2004	Did not enter						
2006	Round 2	-	-	-	-	-	-
2008	Did not enter						
2010	Did not enter						
2012	Did not enter						
2014	Did not enter						
2015	Round 1	2	0	0	2	0	8
2018	Round 1	2	1	0	1	2	3
2020	Cancelled						
2022	Final Round	8	2	3	3	12	15
2024	Final Round	6	2	2	2	5	8
Total	5/11	18	5	5	8	19	34

== See also ==
- Senegal women's national football team
