= Football at the 2023 African Games =

- Football pictogram for the 2023 African Games

Event details
- Games: 2023 African Games
- Host country: Ghana
- Dates: 7 – 22 March 2024
- Venues: 3 (in 2 host cities)

Men's tournament
- Teams: 8 (from 1 confederation)
Medalists
Gold	Ghana
Silver	Uganda
Bronze	Senegal

Women's tournament
- Teams: 7 (from 1 confederation)
Medalists
Gold	Ghana
Silver	Nigeria
Bronze	Uganda

Editions
- ← 2019 2027 →

Football at the 2023 African Games was held in Ghana between 7 and 22 March 2024. In addition to the African Games host city of Accra, matches were also played in Cape Coast.

Two events were contested: a men's and women's competitions. Associations affiliated with CAF may send teams to participate in the tournament. Men's and women's teams were restricted to under-20 players for the tournament.

== Schedule ==
P	Group stage	½	Semifinals	B	Bronze medal match	F	Gold medal match

Event↓/Date →	7 Thu	8 Fri	9 Sat	10 Sun	11 Mon	12 Tue	13 Wed	14 Thu	15 Fri	16 Sat	17 Sun	18 Mon	19 Tue	20 Wed	21 Thu		22 Fri	
Men	G	G			G	G			G				½				B	F
Women		G	G		G	G		G	G			½			B	F		

== Venues ==
3 stadiums were allocated to host the matches.

Accra
Accra Sports Stadium	UG Sports Stadium
Capacity: 40,000	Capacity: 11,000
Cape Coast	Football at the 2023 African Games is located in Ghana
Cape Coast Sports Stadium	Football at the 2023 African Games is located in Ghana
Capacity: 15,000	Football at the 2023 African Games is located in Ghana

== Qualification ==
As per the decision of CAF Executive Committee was as below:
For men: The host nation, and the eight quarter-finalists of the 2023 U-20 Africa Cup of Nations are qualified to the final tournament.
For women: The eight teams who reached the fourth round of the 2022 African U-20 Women's World Cup qualification are qualified to the Final Tournament.

=== Men's qualification ===
Means of qualification	Venue(s)	Dates	Qualified
Host nation	—N/a	—N/a	Ghana
2023 U-20 Afcon quarter-finalists	Egypt	25 February 2023	Nigeria
2023 U-20 Afcon quarter-finalists	Egypt	25 February 2023	Senegal
2023 U-20 Afcon quarter-finalists	Egypt	26 February 2023	Congo
2023 U-20 Afcon quarter-finalists	Egypt	26 February 2023	South Sudan
2023 U-20 Afcon quarter-finalists	Egypt	26 February 2023	Uganda
2023 U-20 Afcon quarter-finalists	Egypt	27 February 2023	Benin
2023 U-20 Afcon quarter-finalists	Egypt	27 February 2023	Gambia
2023 U-20 Afcon quarter-finalists	Egypt	27 February 2023	~~Tunisia~~
Total			9 teams

=== Women's qualification ===
Means of qualification	Venue(s)	Dates	Qualified
2022 African U-20 W-WC qualification 4th round	Home/away	12 December 2021	Morocco
2022 African U-20 W-WC qualification 4th round	Home/away	17 December 2021	Ethiopia
2022 African U-20 W-WC qualification 4th round	Home/away	17 December 2021	Nigeria
2022 African U-20 W-WC qualification 4th round	Home/away	17 December 2021	Uganda
2022 African U-20 W-WC qualification 4th round	Home/away	18 December 2021	~~Cameroon~~
2022 African U-20 W-WC qualification 4th round	Home/away	18 December 2021	Ghana
2022 African U-20 W-WC qualification 4th round	Home/away	18 December 2021	Senegal
2022 African U-20 W-WC qualification 4th round	Home/away	18 December 2021	Tanzania
Total			8 teams

== Medal summary ==
=== Results ===
Event	Gold	Silver	Bronze
Men	Ghana; Yakubu Saeed; Vincent Anane; Daniel Afful; Aaron Essel; Remember Adomako; Nana kwame Boakyie; Maxwell Azafokpe; David Amuzu; McCarthy Ofori; Mohaison Mahamoud; Emmanuel Adjei; Abdul Aziz Issah; Kese Fredrick; Abdul Hakim Sulemana; Emmanuel Mensah; Kelvin Nkrumah; Aziz Misbau; Jerry Afriyie; Michael Ephson	Uganda; Abdul Magada; Shamulan Kamya; Humphrey Oyirwoth; Haruna Lukwago; Ibrahim Juma; Enock Luyima; Ronald Madoi; Apollo Kagogwe; Cyrus Kibande; Rogers Torach; Innocent Kisolo; Ivan Irinimbabazi; Allan Oyirwoth; Hakim Mutebi; Abbas Kyeyune; Arafat Kizza Usama; Patrick Jonah Kakande; Shafiq Magogo; Alpha Thiery Ssali; Bruno Bunyaga	Senegal; Prince Hally Gueye; Mourtalla Fall; Pape Mamadou Diouf; Serigne Fallou Diouf; Ousseynou Diakhate; Daouda Ba; Abdou Aziz Ndiaye; Moustapha Gueye; Ibrahima Diallo; Famara Camara; Mamadou Lamine Diouf; Youssoupha Sanyang; Cheick Tidiane Thiam; Pierre Diatta Dorival; Papa Magueye Gaye; Yaya Dieme; Lamine Mbengue; Mamadou Sarr; Idrissa Gueye; Mame Alassane Niang
Women	Ghana; Afi Amenyaku; Debora Brown; Amina Ahamadu; Comfort Yeboah; Fatimata Fuseini; Comfort Owusu; Abiba Issah; Abena Anoma Opoku; Success Ameyaa; Beline Nyarkoh; Tracey Twun; Stella Nyamekye; Agnes Yeboah; Salamatu Abdoulai; Mercy Attobrah; Mukarama Abdoulai; Jacqueline Amponsah	Nigeria; Anderline Mgbechi; Rachael Unachukwu; Faith Omilana; Shukurat Oladipo; Oluchi Ohaegbulem; Jumoke Alani; Chidinma Ogbuchi; Oluwabunmi Oladeji; Chidera Okenwa; Adoo Yina; Joy Igbokwe; Chioma Olise; Chinyere Kalu; Olushola Shobowale; Motunrayo Ezekiel; Blessing Okpe; Chiamaka Okwuchukwu; Loveth Edeh; Judith Okah; Delight Nwosu	Uganda; Sharon Kaidu; Esther Akujo; Cecilia Kamuli; Harima Kanyago; Catherine Wujja; Claire Hilder Kebirungi; Dorcus Lwalisa; Patricia Akiror; Shakirah Nankwanga; Krusum Namutebi; Shamirah Nalugya; Phiona Nabulime; Eva Nagayi; Shamusa Najjuma; Sumaya Nabuto

=== Medal table ===
* Host nation (Ghana)

Rank	NOC	Gold	Silver	Bronze	Total
1	Ghana (GHA)*	2	0	0	2
2	Uganda (UGA)	0	1	1	2
3	Nigeria (NGR)	0	1	0	1
4	Senegal (SEN)	0	0	1	1
Totals (4 entries)		2	2	2	6

== Men's tournament ==
=== Group stage ===
==== Group A ====
Pos	Team	Pld	W	D	L	GF	GA	GD	Pts	Qualification
1	Ghana (H)	3	2	1	0	4	1	+3	7	Semifinals
2	Congo	3	1	2	0	2	1	+1	5	Semifinals
3	Benin	3	0	2	1	0	1	−1	2	
4	Gambia	3	0	1	2	2	5	−3	1	

Source: https://results.accra2023ag.com
(H) Hosts

==== Group B ====
Pos	Team	Pld	W	D	L	GF	GA	GD	Pts	Qualification
1	Uganda	3	3	0	0	4	1	+3	9	Semifinals
2	Senegal	3	2	0	1	4	3	+1	6	Semifinals
3	Nigeria	3	1	0	2	4	5	−1	3	
4	South Sudan	3	0	0	3	0	3	−3	0	

Source: https://results.accra2023ag.com

=== Knockout stage ===
Semi-finals
19 March – Accra
Ghana	1
Senegal	0
19 March – Accra
Uganda	4
Congo	2

Gold medal match
22 March – Accra
Ghana	1
Uganda	0
Bronze medal match
22 March – Accra
Senegal	2
Congo	0

== Women's tournament ==
=== Group stage ===
==== Group A ====
Pos	Team	Pld	W	D	L	GF	GA	GD	Pts	Qualification
1	Ghana (H)	3	2	1	0	4	2	+2	7	Semifinals
2	Uganda	3	1	2	0	4	2	+2	5	Semifinals
3	Tanzania	3	0	2	1	3	4	−1	2	
4	Ethiopia	3	0	1	2	1	4	−3	1	

Source: results.accra2023ag.com
(H) Hosts

==== Group B ====
Pos	Team	Pld	W	D	L	GF	GA	GD	Pts	Qualification
1	Nigeria	2	2	0	0	6	0	+6	6	Semifinals
2	Senegal	2	1	0	1	4	4	0	3	Semifinals
3	Morocco	2	0	0	2	0	6	−6	0	

Source: results.accra2023ag.com

=== Knockout stage ===
Semi-finals
18 March – Cape Coast
Ghana	3
Senegal	1
18 March – Cape Coast
Nigeria	2
Uganda	0

Gold medal match
21 March – Cape Coast
Ghana (a.e.t.)	2
Nigeria	1
Bronze medal match
21 March – Cape Coast
Senegal	0 (5)
Uganda (p)	0 (6)
