= 2023 WAFU Zone B U-20 Women's Cup =

U-20 Coupe féminine UFOA Zone B Ghana 2023

Tournament details
- Host country: Ghana
- City: Kumasi
- Dates: 20th May – 3rd June
- Teams: 7 (from 1 sub-confederation)
- Venue: 1 (in 1 host city)

Final positions
- Champions: Ghana (1st title)
- Runners-up: Nigeria
- Third place: Burkina Faso
- Fourth place: Benin

Tournament statistics
- Matches played: 13
- Goals scored: 55 (4.23 per match)
- Top scorer: (Nigeria) Esther Ajakaye (6 goals)
- Best player: (Ghana) Stella Nyamekye
- Best goalkeeper: (Ghana) Afi Amenyeku
- All statistics correct as of 31 May 2023.

The 2023 WAFU Zone B U-20 Women's Cup is the inaugural edition of the WAFU Zone B U20 Women's Cup, the international women's youth football championship contested by the under-20 national teams of the member associations of the West African Football Union Zone B, the tournament is scheduled to take place in Ghana between 20 May and 3 June 2023.

== Teams ==
=== Participating nations ===
All WAFU zone B members associations confirmed participation in the first edition in Ghana.

Team	App	Last	Best placement in the tournament
Benin	1st	—N/a	debut
Burkina Faso	1st	—N/a	debut
Ghana	1st	—N/a	debut
Ivory Coast	1st	—N/a	debut
Niger	1st	—N/a	debut
Nigeria	1st	—N/a	debut
Togo	1st	—N/a	debut

=== Draw ===
The final draw took place at the WAFU-B headquarters in Abidjan, Ivory Coast, on 17 April 2023 at 10:00 GMT (UTC+0).

Pot 1	Pot 2	Pot 3	Pot 4
Ghana (hosts); Nigeria	Ivory Coast; Togo	Burkina Faso; Benin	Niger

== Venues ==
on 30 March 2023, WAFU B announced Kumasi as the host city and confirmed venues selected for the tournament.

2023 WAFU Zone B U-20 Women's Cup is located in Ghana	Kumasi	
2023 WAFU Zone B U-20 Women's Cup is located in Ghana	Baba Yara Stadium	Paa Joe Stadium
2023 WAFU Zone B U-20 Women's Cup is located in Ghana	Capacity: 40,528	Capacity: 20,000

== Squads ==
Players born between 1 January 2003 and 31 December 2007 are eligible to compete in the tournament.

- benin
- Nigeria :
- Ghana

== Match officials ==
WAFU B appointed referees and assistant referees for the tournament are yet to be announced.

Referees

Assistant referees

== Group Stage ==
All times are local, GMT (UTC+0)

=== Group A ===
Pos	Team	Pld	W	D	L	GF	GA	GD	Pts	Qualification
1	Ghana (H)	2	2	0	0	6	1	+5	6	Knockout stage
2	Benin	2	1	0	1	5	5	0	3	Knockout stage
3	Ivory Coast	2	0	0	2	3	8	−5	0	

Source: WAFU B
Rules for classification: Group stage tiebreakers
(H) Hosts
20 May 2023
15:00

Ghana	3–0	Benin
Nyame 35'; Amponsah 61'; Nyamekye 67'

Baba Yara Stadium, Kumasi

23 May 2023
18:00

Benin	5–2	Ivory Coast
Gueasseh 26' (o.g.); Zinsou 29'; Sadikou 64', 70' (pen.); Imorou 81'	Report	Dagba 54'; Nidri 59'

Baba Yara Stadium, Kumasi

27 May 2023
16:00

Ivory Coast	1–3	Ghana
Digbeu 53'		Nyame 14', 62'; Nyamekye 21'

Baba Yara Stadium, Kumasi

=== Group B ===
Pos	Team	Pld	W	D	L	GF	GA	GD	Pts	Qualification
1	Nigeria	3	3	0	0	16	0	+16	9	Knockout stage
2	Burkina Faso	3	2	0	1	10	3	+7	6	Knockout stage
3	Togo	3	1	0	2	3	8	−5	3	
4	Niger	3	0	0	3	0	18	−18	0	

Source: WAFU B
Rules for classification: Group stage tiebreakers
21 May 2023
15:00

Nigeria	7–0	Niger
Ajakaye 3', 13', 54'; Kalu 30'; Okah 49' (pen.); Alani 64'; Olise 90+1'

Baba Yara Stadium, Kumasi
21 May 2023
18:00

Burkina Faso	2–0	Togo
Helbi 29'; Bélem 83'

Baba Yara Stadium, Kumasi

24 May 2023
15:00

Niger	0–8	Burkina Faso
		Kabré 21', 34', 83'; Guira 30'; Kouanda 46'; Nayaga 75'; Djigumende 85'; Kabore 88'

Baba Yara Stadium, Kumasi
24 May 2023
18:00

Togo	0–6	Nigeria
	Report	Bello 11', 57'; Sabastine 12', 76'; Onyenezide 30' (pen.); Ajakaye 59'

Baba Yara Stadium, Kumasi

28 May 2023
16:00

Togo	3–0	Niger
Azimevi 18'; Kayaba 51'; Zoutepe 63'

Paa Joe Stadium, Kumasi
28 May 2023
16:00

Nigeria	3–0	Burkina Faso
Ajakaye 11', 60'; Sabastine 88'

Baba Yara Stadium, Kumasi

== Knockout stage ==
In the knockout stage, extra time and penalty shoot-out will be used to decide the winner if necessary.

=== Bracket ===
Semi-finals
31 May – Kumasi
Ghana	3
Burkina Faso	1
31 May – Kumasi
Nigeria	3
Benin	0

Final
3 June – Kumasi
Ghana(p)	1(3)
Nigeria	1(1)
Third place
3 June – Kumasi
Burkina Faso	2
Benin	1

=== Semi-finals ===
31 May 2023
15:00

Ghana	3-1	Burkina Faso
Nyamekye 12'; Ameyaa 28'; Seidu 83'		Djiguemde 5'

Baba Yara Stadium, Kumasi
31 May 2023
18:00

Nigeria	3–0	Benin
Bello 24'; Onyenezide 34', 62'

Baba Yara Stadium, Kumasi

=== Third place match ===
3 June 2023
15:00

Burkina Faso	2–1	Benin
Kabré 8', 13'		Coreen 84' (pen.)

Baba Yara Stadium, Kumasi

=== Final 2023 u-20 women's ===
3 June 2023
18:00

Ghana	1–1	Nigeria
Nyamekye 39' (pen.)		sabastine 85'
Penalties
Yeboah (penalty scored); Ayisha (penalty missed); Nyamekye (penalty scored); Alormenu (penalty missed); Amponsah (penalty scored)	3–1	(penalty missed) ogbuchi; (penalty missed) sabastine; (penalty missed) chinemerem; (penalty scored) Kalu

Baba Yara Stadium, Kumasi

== Awards ==
The following awards were given for the tournament:

Best Player
(Ghana) Stella Nyamekye
Top Scorer
(Nigeria) Esther Opeyemi Ajakaye
(6 goals)
GoalKeeper of the Tournament
(Ghana) Afi Amenyeku

== Goalscorers ==
There were 55 goals scored in 13 matches, for an average of 4.23 goals per match.

6 goals

- (Nigeria) Esther Ajakaye

5 goals

- (Nigeria) Esther Onyenezide
- (Burkina Faso) Adèle Kabré

4 goals

- (Ghana) Stella Nyamekye
- (Nigeria) Flourish Sabastine

3 goals

- (Nigeria) Amina Bello
- (Ghana) Mafiaa Nyame

2 goals

- (Benin) Milhad Titilola Sadikou
- (Burkina Faso) Ragnangnewende Djigumende

1 goal

- (Ghana) Mary Amponsah
- (Ghana) Succes Ameyaa
- (Ghana) Feizu Seidu
- (Benin) Mahugnon Zinsou
- (Benin) Kaddiatou Imorou
- (Benin) Eunice Coreen
- (Ivory Coast) Essi Dagba
- (Ivory Coast) Amenan Nidri
- (Nigeria) Chinyere Kalu
- (Nigeria) Adaobi Okah
- (Nigeria) Victoria Alani
- (Nigeria) Chioma Olise
- (Burkina Faso) Mounifatou Helbi
- (Burkina Faso) Alimeta Belém
- (Burkina Faso) Deborah Guira
- (Burkina Faso) Salamatu Kouanda
- (Burkina Faso) Ange Kelly Nayaga
- (Burkina Faso) Ragnangnewende Kabore
- (Togo) Akouvi Azimevi
- (Togo) Tatiana Kayaba
- (Togo) Adjovi Zoutepe

1 own goal

- (Ivory Coast) Noella Gueasseh
