= Football at the 2023 African Games – Women's tournament =

2023 African Games women's football tournament

Tournament details
- Host country: Ghana
- City: Accra
- Dates: 8–21 March 2024
- Teams: 7 (from 1 confederation)
- Venue: 1 (in 1 host city)

Final positions
- Champions: Ghana (2nd title)
- Runners-up: Nigeria
- Third place: Uganda
- Fourth place: Senegal

Tournament statistics
- Matches played: 13
- Goals scored: 31 (2.38 per match)
- Top scorer: (Ghana) Tracey Twum (3 goals)

The 2023 African Games women's football tournament is the 6th edition of the African Games women's football tournament. The women's football tournament was held as part of the 2023 African Games between 8 and 21 March 2024. Under-20 national teams took part in the tournament.

== Schedule ==
P	Group stage	½	Semifinals	B	Bronze medal match	F	Gold medal match

8 Fri	9 Sat	10 Sun	11 Mon	12 Tue	13 Wed	14 Thu	15 Fri	16 Sat	17 Sun	18 Mon	19 Tue	20 Wed	21 Thu	
G	G		G	G		G	G			½			B	F

== Qualification ==
As per the decision of CAF Executive Committee was as below, the eight teams who reached the fourth round of the 2022 African U-20 Women's World Cup qualification are qualified to the Final Tournament.

Means of qualification	Venue(s)	Dates	Qualified
2022 African U-20 W-WC qualification 4th round	Home/away	12 December 2021	Morocco
2022 African U-20 W-WC qualification 4th round	Home/away	17 December 2021	Ethiopia
2022 African U-20 W-WC qualification 4th round	Home/away	17 December 2021	Nigeria
2022 African U-20 W-WC qualification 4th round	Home/away	17 December 2021	Uganda
2022 African U-20 W-WC qualification 4th round	Home/away	18 December 2021	~~Cameroon~~
2022 African U-20 W-WC qualification 4th round	Home/away	18 December 2021	Ghana
2022 African U-20 W-WC qualification 4th round	Home/away	18 December 2021	Senegal
2022 African U-20 W-WC qualification 4th round	Home/away	18 December 2021	Tanzania
Total			8 teams

== Venues ==
1 stadium were allocated to host the matches.

Football at the 2023 African Games – Women's tournament is located in Ghana	Cape Coast
Football at the 2023 African Games – Women's tournament is located in Ghana	Cape Coast Sports Stadium
Football at the 2023 African Games – Women's tournament is located in Ghana	Capacity: 15,000

== Group stage ==
=== Group A ===
Pos	Team	Pld	W	D	L	GF	GA	GD	Pts	Qualification
1	Ghana (H)	3	2	1	0	4	2	+2	7	Semifinals
2	Uganda	3	1	2	0	4	2	+2	5	Semifinals
3	Tanzania	3	0	2	1	3	4	−1	2	
4	Ethiopia	3	0	1	2	1	4	−3	1	

Source: results.accra2023ag.com
(H) Hosts
9 March 2024
17:00

Tanzania	1–1	Uganda
Mnunka 89'	Report	Kunihira 41'

Cape Coast Sports Stadium, Cape Coast
Referee: Natacha Konan (Ivory Coast)
9 March 2024
20:00

Ghana	1–0	Ethiopia
Owusu 59'	Report

Cape Coast Sports Stadium, Cape Coast
Referee: Cynthia Ngakosso (Congo)

12 March 2024
17:00

Uganda	2–0	Ethiopia
Nagadya 11'; Lwalisa 30'	Report

Cape Coast Sports Stadium, Cape Coast
Referee: Zakia El Grini (Morocco)
12 March 2024
20:00

Ghana	2–1	Tanzania
Twum 45+2'; M. Abdulai 64'	Report	Mnunka 22'

Cape Coast Sports Stadium, Cape Coast
Referee: Noura Samir (Egypt)

15 March 2024
17:00

Ethiopia	1–1	Tanzania
Tadesse 80'	Report	Ubamba 6'

Cape Coast Sports Stadium, Cape Coast
Referee: Yacine Samassa (Mauritania)
15 March 2024
20:00

Uganda	1–1	Ghana
Nagadya 10'	Report	M. Abdulai 37'

Cape Coast Sports Stadium, Cape Coast
Referee: Seonyatseng Joyce Tshephe (Botswana)

=== Group B ===
Pos	Team	Pld	W	D	L	GF	GA	GD	Pts	Qualification
1	Nigeria	2	2	0	0	6	0	+6	6	Semifinals
2	Senegal	2	1	0	1	4	4	0	3	Semifinals
3	Morocco	2	0	0	2	0	6	−6	0	

Source: results.accra2023ag.com
8 March 2024
20:00

Nigeria	2–0	Morocco
Olise 19'; Yina 40'	Report

Cape Coast Sports Stadium, Cape Coast
Referee: Raya Sisai (Ethiopia)

11 March 2024
20:00

Nigeria	4–0	Senegal
Nijdeka 14'; Ezekiel 50'; Kales 51' (o.g.); Olise 81'	Report

Cape Coast Sports Stadium, Cape Coast
Referee: Rachel Nzigire (Central African Republic)

14 March 2024
20:00

Morocco	0–4	Senegal
	Report	Badio 6'; Kandé 18'; Choab 65' (o.g.); Mendy 87'

Cape Coast Sports Stadium, Cape Coast

== Knockout stage ==
=== Bracket ===
Semi-finals
18 March – Cape Coast
Ghana	3
Senegal	1
18 March – Cape Coast
Nigeria	2
Uganda	0

Gold medal match
21 March – Cape Coast
Ghana (a.e.t.)	2
Nigeria	1
Bronze medal match
21 March – Cape Coast
Senegal	0 (5)
Uganda (p)	0 (6)

=== Semi-finals ===
18 March 2024
20:30

Ghana	3–1	Senegal
Twum 18'; Amponsah 45+1', 55'	Report	Kandé 54' (pen.)

Cape Coast Sports Stadium, Cape Coast
Referee: Rachel Nzigire (Central African Republic)

18 March 2024
17:00

Nigeria	2–0	Uganda
Okah 74'; Okwuchukwu 89'	Report

Cape Coast Sports Stadium, Cape Coast
Referee: Noura Samir (Egypt)

=== Bronze medal match ===
21 March 2024
17:00

Senegal	0–0 (a.e.t.)	Uganda
	Report
Penalties
Kandé (penalty scored); Badio (penalty scored); Ndiaye (penalty missed); Sané (penalty scored); Diallo (penalty scored); Casset (penalty scored); Bassene (penalty missed)	5–6	(penalty scored) C. Nagadya; (penalty scored) Nalugya; (penalty scored) Lwalisa; (penalty missed) Nankwanga; (penalty scored) Wujja; (penalty scored) Kanyago; (penalty scored) Najjuma

Cape Coast Sports Stadium, Cape Coast
Referee: Seonyatseng Joyce Tshephe (Botswana)

=== Gold medal match ===
21 March 2024
20:30

Ghana	2–1 (a.e.t.)	Nigeria
Twum 77'; Issah 98'	Report	Nijdeka 23'

Cape Coast Sports Stadium, Cape Coast
Attendance: 15,000
Referee: Natacha Konan (Ivory Coast)

== Statistics ==
=== Goalscorers ===
There were 31 goals scored in 13 matches, for an average of 2.38 goals per match.

3 goals

- (Ghana) Tracey Twum

2 goals

- (Ghana) Ophelia Amponsah
- (Ghana) Murakama Abdulai
- (Nigeria) Edeh Nijdeka
- (Nigeria) Chioma Olise
- (Senegal) Rokhyatou Kandé
- (Tanzania) Aisha Mnunka
- (Uganda) Catherine Nagadya

1 goal

- (Ethiopia) Aregash Kalsa Tadesse
- (Ghana) Comfort Owusu
- (Nigeria) Motunrayo Ezekiel
- (Nigeria) Habiba Issah
- (Nigeria) Aicha Kales
- (Nigeria) Judith Adaobi Okah
- (Nigeria) Chiamaka Okwuchukwu
- (Nigeria) Addo Yina
- (Senegal) Khadija Badio
- (Senegal) Axelle Pefla Mendy
- (Tanzania) Hasnath Ubamba
- (Uganda) Docus Lwalisa
- (Uganda) Margret Kunihira

1 own goal

- (Morocco) Abir Choab (against Senegal)

=== Final ranking ===
Pos	Team	Pld	W	D	L	GF	GA	GD	Pts	Final result
Gold medal	Ghana (H)	5	4	1	0	9	4	+5	13	Gold Medal
Silver medal	Nigeria	4	3	0	1	10	1	+9	9	Silver Medal
Bronze medal	Uganda	5	1	3	1	4	4	0	6	Bronze Medal
4	Senegal	4	1	1	2	5	7	−2	4	Fourth place
5	Tanzania	3	0	2	1	3	4	−1	2	Eliminated in group stage
6	Ethiopia	3	0	1	2	1	4	−3	1	Eliminated in group stage
7	Morocco	2	0	0	2	0	6	−6	0	Eliminated in group stage

Source: Medals Standings
(H) Hosts

== See also ==
- Football at the 2023 African Games – Men's tournament
