= Football at the 2023 African Games – Men's tournament =

2023 African Games men's football tournament

Tournament details
- Host country: Ghana
- City: Accra
- Dates: 7–22 March 2024
- Teams: 8 (from 1 confederation)
- Venues: 2 (in 1 host city)

Final positions
- Champions: Ghana (2nd title)
- Runners-up: Uganda
- Third place: Senegal
- Fourth place: Congo

Tournament statistics
- Matches played: 16
- Goals scored: 30 (1.88 per match)
- Top scorer: (Ghana) Jerry Afriyie (3 goals)

The 2023 African Games men's football tournament is the 13th edition of the African Games men's football tournament. The men's football tournament was held as part of the 2023 African Games between 7 and 22 March 2024. Under-20 national teams took part in the tournament.

== Schedule ==
| P | Group stage | ½ | Semifinals | B | Bronze medal match | F | Gold medal match |

| 7 Thu | 8 Fri | 9 Sat | 10 Sun | 11 Mon | 12 Tue | 13 Wed | 14 Thu | 15 Fri | 16 Sat | 17 Sun | 18 Mon | 19 Tue | 20 Wed | 21 Thu | 22 Fri | |
|---|---|---|---|---|---|---|---|---|---|---|---|---|---|---|---|---|
| G | G | | | G | G | | | G | | | | ½ | | | B | F |

== Qualification ==
As per the decision of CAF Executive Committee decided that the host nation, and the eight quarter-finalists of the 2023 U-20 Africa Cup of Nations are qualified to the final tournament.

| Means of qualification | Venue(s) | Dates | Qualified |
|---|---|---|---|
| Host nation | —N/a | —N/a | Ghana |
| 2023 U-20 Afcon quarter-finalists | Egypt | 25 February 2023 | Nigeria |
| 2023 U-20 Afcon quarter-finalists | Egypt | 25 February 2023 | Senegal |
| 2023 U-20 Afcon quarter-finalists | Egypt | 26 February 2023 | Congo |
| 2023 U-20 Afcon quarter-finalists | Egypt | 26 February 2023 | South Sudan |
| 2023 U-20 Afcon quarter-finalists | Egypt | 26 February 2023 | Uganda |
| 2023 U-20 Afcon quarter-finalists | Egypt | 27 February 2023 | Benin |
| 2023 U-20 Afcon quarter-finalists | Egypt | 27 February 2023 | Gambia |
| 2023 U-20 Afcon quarter-finalists | Egypt | 27 February 2023 | ~~Tunisia~~ |
| Total | | | 9 teams |

== Venues ==
2 stadiums were allocated to host the matches.

| Football at the 2023 African Games – Men's tournament is located in Ghana | Accra | |
|---|---|---|
| Football at the 2023 African Games – Men's tournament is located in Ghana | Accra Sports Stadium | UG Sports Stadium |
| Football at the 2023 African Games – Men's tournament is located in Ghana | Capacity: 40,000 | Capacity: 11,000 |

== Group stage ==
=== Group A ===
| Pos | Team | Pld | W | D | L | GF | GA | GD | Pts | Qualification |
|---|---|---|---|---|---|---|---|---|---|---|
| 1 | Ghana (H) | 3 | 2 | 1 | 0 | 4 | 1 | +3 | 7 | Semifinals |
| 2 | Congo | 3 | 1 | 2 | 0 | 2 | 1 | +1 | 5 | Semifinals |
| 3 | Benin | 3 | 0 | 2 | 1 | 0 | 1 | −1 | 2 | |
| 4 | Gambia | 3 | 0 | 1 | 2 | 2 | 5 | −3 | 1 | |

Source: https://results.accra2023ag.com
(H) Hosts
8 March 2024
15:00

| Ghana | 0–0 | Congo |
|---|---|---|
| | Report |

UG Sports Stadium, Accra
Referee: Lotfi Bekouassa (Algeria)
8 March 2024
20:00

| Gambia | 0–0 | Benin |
|---|---|---|
| | Report |

UG Sports Stadium, Accra
Referee: Hambaba Hillary (Zambia)

12 March 2024
17:00

| Benin | 0–0 | Congo |
|---|---|---|
| | Report |

UG Sports Stadium, Accra
Referee: Saddam Houssein (Djibouti)
12 March 2024
20:00

| Ghana | 3–1 | Gambia |
|---|---|---|
| Aziz 13'; Issah 49'; Afriyie 90' | Report | Ceesay 83' |

UG Sports Stadium, Accra
Referee: Ahmed Arajiga (Tanzania)

15 March 2024
17:00

| Congo | 2–1 | Gambia |
|---|---|---|
| Djolvy 61'; Moussavou 89' | Report | Darbo 19' |

Accra Sports Stadium, Accra
Attendance: Basheer Salisu (Nigeria)
15 March 2024
17:00

| Benin | 0–1 | Ghana |
|---|---|---|
| | Report | Afriyie 34' |

UG Sports Stadium, Accra
Referee: El Hadji Sy (Senegal)

=== Group B ===
| Pos | Team | Pld | W | D | L | GF | GA | GD | Pts | Qualification |
|---|---|---|---|---|---|---|---|---|---|---|
| 1 | Uganda | 3 | 3 | 0 | 0 | 4 | 1 | +3 | 9 | Semifinals |
| 2 | Senegal | 3 | 2 | 0 | 1 | 4 | 3 | +1 | 6 | Semifinals |
| 3 | Nigeria | 3 | 1 | 0 | 2 | 4 | 5 | −1 | 3 | |
| 4 | South Sudan | 3 | 0 | 0 | 3 | 0 | 3 | −3 | 0 | |

Source: https://results.accra2023ag.com
7 March 2024
17:00

| South Sudan | 0–1 | Senegal |
|---|---|---|
| | Report | Sadio 16' |

Accra Sports Stadium, Accra
Referee: Cregue Moukagni (Gabon)
7 March 2024
20:00

| Nigeria | 1–2 | Uganda |
|---|---|---|
| Isyaka 37' | Report | Usama 34'; Irinimbabazi 81' |

UG Sports Stadium, Accra
Referee: Abdourazak Ahmed (Libya)

11 March 2024
17:00

| Senegal | 0–1 | Uganda |
|---|---|---|
| | Report | Oyirwoth 28' |

UG Sports Stadium, Accra
Referee: Gnama Aklesso (Togo)
11 March 2024
20:00

| Nigeria | 1–0 | South Sudan |
|---|---|---|
| Isyaka 80' (pen.) | Report |

UG Sports Stadium, Accra
Referee: Manet Abdoulaye (Guinea-Bissau)

15 March 2024
20:00

| Senegal | 3–2 | Nigeria |
|---|---|---|
| Gueye 22', 28'; Camara 66' (pen.) | Report | Aguda 2'; Chibueze 50' |

Accra Sports Stadium, Accra
Referee: Antonio Dungula (Angola)
15 March 2024
20:00

| Uganda | 1–0 | South Sudan |
|---|---|---|
| Kagogwe 74' | Report |

UG Sports Stadium, Accra
Referee: Nguema Owono (Equatorial Guinea)

== Knockout stage ==
=== Bracket ===
Semi-finals
19 March – Accra
Ghana | 1
Senegal | 0
19 March – Accra
Uganda | 4
Congo | 2

Gold medal match
22 March – Accra
Ghana | 1
Uganda | 0
Bronze medal match
22 March – Accra
Senegal | 2
Congo | 0

=== Semi-finals ===
19 March 2024
20:30

| Ghana | 1–0 | Senegal |
|---|---|---|
| Ephson 84' | Report |

Accra Sports Stadium, Accra
Referee: Ahmed Arajiga (Tanzania)

19 March 2024
17:00

| Uganda | 4–2 | Congo |
|---|---|---|
| Kyeyune 61'; Bunyaga 69' 73'; Mutebi 80' | Report | Akouala 16'; Koto 45+4' |

Accra Sports Stadium, Accra
Referee: Abdourazak Ahmed (Libya)

=== Bronze medal match ===
22 March 2024
17:00

| Senegal | 2–0 | Congo |
|---|---|---|
| Gueye 74'; Niang 90+2' | Report |

Accra Sports Stadium, Accra
Referee: Lotfi Bekouassa (Algeria)

=== Gold medal match ===
22 March 2024
20:30

| Ghana | 1–0 | Uganda |
|---|---|---|
| Afriyie 90' | Report |

Accra Sports Stadium, Accra
Attendance: 40,000
Referee: Hambaba Hillary (Zambia)

== Statistics ==
=== Goalscorers ===
There were 30 goals scored in 16 matches, for an average of 1.88 goals per match.

3 goals

- (Ghana) Jerry Afriyie

2 goals

- (Nigeria) Sadiq Isyaka
- (Senegal) Idrissa Gueye
- (Uganda) Bruno Bunyaga

1 goal

- (Republic of the Congo) Servyl Akouala
- (Republic of the Congo) Moukouba Djolvy
- (Republic of the Congo) Mignon Koto
- (Republic of the Congo) Dechan Moussavou
- (The Gambia) Ousman Ceesay
- (The Gambia) Dawda Darbo
- (Ghana) Michael Ephson
- (Ghana) Abdul Aziz Issah
- (Ghana) Aziz Musibau
- (Nigeria) Charles Aguda
- (Nigeria) Favour Izuogu Chibueze
- (Senegal) Famara Camara
- (Senegal) Alassane Niang
- (Senegal) Lamine Sadio
- (Uganda) Ivan Irinimbabazi
- (Uganda) Apollo Kagogwe
- (Uganda) Abasi Kyeyune
- (Uganda) Hakim Mutebi
- (Uganda) Allan Oyirwoth
- (Uganda) Arafat Usama

=== Final ranking ===
| Pos | Team | Pld | W | D | L | GF | GA | GD | Pts | Final result |
|---|---|---|---|---|---|---|---|---|---|---|
| Gold medal | Ghana (H) | 5 | 4 | 1 | 0 | 6 | 1 | +5 | 13 | Gold Medal |
| Silver medal | Uganda | 5 | 4 | 0 | 1 | 8 | 4 | +4 | 12 | Silver Medal |
| Bronze medal | Senegal | 5 | 3 | 0 | 2 | 6 | 4 | +2 | 9 | Bronze Medal |
| 4 | Congo | 5 | 1 | 2 | 2 | 4 | 7 | −3 | 5 | Fourth place |
| 5 | Nigeria | 3 | 1 | 0 | 2 | 4 | 5 | −1 | 3 | Eliminated in group stage |
| 6 | Benin | 3 | 0 | 2 | 1 | 0 | 1 | −1 | 2 | Eliminated in group stage |
| 7 | Gambia | 3 | 0 | 1 | 2 | 2 | 5 | −3 | 1 | Eliminated in group stage |
| 8 | South Sudan | 3 | 0 | 0 | 3 | 0 | 3 | −3 | 0 | Eliminated in group stage |

Source: Medals Standings
(H) Hosts

== See also ==
- Football at the 2023 African Games – Women's tournament
