= Ngalula =

Ngalula or N'Galula is a Congolese Unisex given name surname. Notable people with the surname include:

== N'Galula ==
- Floribert N'Galula (born 1987), Belgian footballer
- Gabriel N'Galula (born 1982), Belgian footballer
- John Buana N'Galula (born 1968), Congolese footballer

== Ngalula ==
=== Given name ===
- Ngalula Fuamba (born 1994), Canadian rugby player
- Ngalula Mubenga, Congolese academic and engineer

=== Surname ===
- Déborah Ngalula (born 2002), Congolese footballer
- Joseph Ngalula (born 1928), Congolese writer and politician
- Lukengu Ngalula (born 1971), Congolese basketball player
- Tina Ngalula (born 1995), Congolese footballer
