= Rwanda women's national under-20 football team =

Rwanda women's U-20
- Nickname: Amavubi (The Wasps)
- Association: Rwanda Football Federation
- Confederation: CAF (Africa)
- Sub-confederation: CECAFA (East Africa)
First colours	Second colours

First international
- Uganda 2–1 Rwanda (Kampala, Uganda; 24 October 2009)

Biggest win
- Rwanda 2–1 Zimbabwe (Kigali, Rwanda; 11 May 2025)

Biggest defeat
- Rwanda 0–4 Ethiopia (Kigali, Rwanda; 24 September 2021); Ethiopia 4–0 Rwanda (Bahir Dar, Ethiopia; 6 October 2021)

African U-20 Women's World Cup qualification
- Appearances: 3 (first in 2010)
- Best result: Round 1 (2022)

FIFA U-20 Women's World Cup
- Appearances: None

The Rwanda women's national under-20 football team represents Rwanda in international youth women's football competitions.

The team competed at the 2022 African U-20 Women's World Cup Qualifying Tournament without qualifying for the 2022 FIFA U-20 Women's World Cup.

== Competitive record ==
=== FIFA U-20 Women's World Cup record ===
FIFA U-20 Women's World Cup
Year	Result	Matches	Wins	Draws*	Losses	GF	GA
(Canada) 2002	Did not qualify						
(Thailand) 2004	Did not qualify						
(Russia) 2006	Did not qualify						
(Chile) 2008	Did not qualify						
(Germany) 2010	Did not qualify						
(Japan) 2012	Did not qualify						
(Canada) 2014	Did not qualify						
(Papua New Guinea) 2016	Did not qualify						
(France) 2018	Did not qualify						
(Costa Rica) 2022	Did not qualify						
(Colombia) 2024	Did not qualify						
(Poland) 2026	Did not qualify						
Total	0/12	0	0	0	0	0	0

== See also ==
- Rwanda women's national football team
- Rwanda women's national under-17 football team
