= Faith Oriyomi Omilana =

Nigerian association football player

Faith Oriyomi Omilana is a Nigerian footballer who served as the first-choice goalkeeper for the Nigeria women's national under-17 football team, known as the Flamingos.

== Early life ==
Faith Oriyomi Omilana was born on 1 December 2005 in Nigeria. She developed an early interest in football and showed particular aptitude as a goalkeeper. Her skills and commitment to the sport led to her progression through youth development systems, eventually earning her a place in the Nigeria women's national under-17 football team, commonly known as the Flamingos, where she served as the team's first-choice goalkeeper.

== International career ==
2022 FIFA U‑17 Women's World Cup

- In the 2022 FIFA U‑17 Women's World Cup held in India, Omilana was confirmed as Nigeria's first-choice goalkeeper in the official 21-player squad.
- She played in the quarter‑final match against the United States. After a 1–1 draw in regulation time, Omilana made several crucial saves including two during the penalty shootout to help the Flamingos advance to their first-ever semifinal at the competition.
- In the third place match against Germany, Omilana continued her strong form, saving a decisive penalty in the shootout to secure Nigeria's first-ever bronze medal in the tournament.

== Honours ==
Intercontinental

- FIFA U-17 Women's World Cup
  - Third place: (2022)

Continental

- African U-17 Cup of Nations for Women
  - Winners: 2008, 2010, 2012, 2013 & 2016

=== African U-17 Cup of Nations for Women record ===
African U-17 Cup of Nations for Women
Appearances: 6
Year	Round	Position	Pld	W	D	L	GF	GA
2008	Champions	1st	4	2	1	1	8	4
2010	Qualified for World Cup	1st	2	2	0	0	7	1
2012	Qualified for World Cup	1st	4	4	0	0	12	1
2013	Qualified for World Cup	1st	-	-	-	-	-	-
2016	Qualified for World Cup	1st	4	4	0	0	16	0
2018	Second round	2nd	4	0	4	0	3	3
2022	Qualified for World Cup	1st	4	3	1	0	7	0
2024	Qualified for World Cup	1st	6	5	1	0	25	2
Total	8/8	7 titles	28	24	7	1	89	13

== Head-to-head record ==
The following table shows Nigeria's head-to-head record in the FIFA U-17 Women's World Cup.

Opponent	Pld	W	D	L	GF	GA	GD	Win %
Azerbaijan	1	1	0	0	11	0	+11	100.00
Brazil	2	0	1	1	2	3	−1	0.00
Canada	1	0	1	0	1	1	+0	0.00
China	1	1	0	0	2	1	+1	100.00
Chile	2	2	0	0	7	1	+6	100.00
Colombia	3	2	1	0	5	1	+4	66.67
Dominican Republic	1	1	0	0	1	0	+1	100.00
Ecuador	1	1	0	0	4	0	+4	100.00
England	2	0	1	1	0	1	−1	0.00
France	1	0	1	0	0	0	+0	0.00
Germany	2	0	1	1	4	5	−1	0.00
Mexico	1	1	0	0	3	0	+3	100.00
New Zealand	2	2	0	0	8	1	+7	100.00
North Korea	2	1	0	1	3	5	−2	50.00
South Korea	2	1	0	1	7	7	+0	50.00
Spain	1	0	0	1	0	3	−3	0.00
Trinidad and Tobago	1	1	0	0	2	1	+1	100.00
United States	2	0	1	1	1	3	−2	0.00
Total	28	14	7	7	61	33	+28	50.00

== See also ==
- Nigeria women's national football team
- Nigeria women's national under-20 football team
