= 2022 African U-20 Women's World Cup qualification =

2022 African U-20 Women's World Cup Qualifying Tournament
Tournament details
- Dates: 7 August 2021 – 27 March 2022
- Teams: 40 (from 1 confederation)

Tournament statistics
- Matches played: 61
- Goals scored: 206 (3.38 per match)
- Top scorer(s): (Ethiopia) Rediet Assresahagn (Nigeria) Flourish Sabastine (7 goals each)

The 2022 African U-20 Women's World Cup Qualifying Tournament was the 11th edition of the African U-20 Women's World Cup Qualifying Tournament, the biennial international youth football competition organised by the Confederation of African Football (CAF) to determine which women's under-20 national teams from Africa qualify for the FIFA U-20 Women's World Cup. Players born on or after 1 January 2002 were eligible to compete in the tournament.

Two teams could qualify from this tournament for the 2022 FIFA U-20 Women's World Cup (originally 2020 but postponed due to COVID-19 pandemic) in Costa Rica as the CAF representatives. This edition of the tournament also doubles as the qualifiers for the 2023 African Games in Accra, Ghana where teams who reached the fourth round qualified automatically.

== Draw ==
A total of 40 (out of 54) CAF member national teams entered the qualifying rounds. The draw was held on 10 May 2021 at the CAF headquarters in Cairo, Egypt.

- In the first round, the 16 teams were drawn into 8 ties, with teams divided into five pots based on their geographical zones and those in the same pot drawn to play against each other.
- In the second round, the 8 first round winners and the 24 teams receiving byes to the second round were allocated into 16 ties based on the first round tie numbers, with eight first round winners playing against the eight teams receiving byes, and the other 16 first round winners playing against each other.
- In the third round, the 16 second round winners were allocated into eight ties based on the second round tie numbers.
- In the fourth round, the eight third round winners were allocated into four ties based on the third round tie numbers.
- In the fifth round, the four fourth round winners were allocated into two ties based on the fourth round tie numbers

=== Table ===
Participants (40 teams)
Pot A (8 from CECAFA)	Pot B (10 from COSAFA)	Pot C (4 from UNAF)	Pot D (8 from UNIFFAC)	Pot E (8 from WAFU A)	Pot F (6 from WAFU B)
Ethiopia; Uganda; South Sudan **(W)**; Eritrea; Kenya; Djibouti; Burundi; Rwanda	Malawi; Zambia; Tanzania; Namibia; Eswatini; Angola; Botswana; Mozambique; South Africa	Tunisia **(W)**; Egypt; Morocco	Equatorial Guinea **(W)**; DR Congo; São Tomé and Príncipe; Togo **(W)**; Congo; Gabon **(W)**; Cameroon; Central African Republic	Sierra Leone; Gambia; Senegal; Mauritania **(W)**; Mali; Guinea; Guinea-Bissau **(W)**	Burkina Faso; **Nigeria**; **Ghana**; Benin; Niger

Notes

- Teams in **bold** qualified for the final tournament.
- (W): Withdrew after draw

=== Did not enter ===
- Algeria
- Chad
- Cape Verde
- Comoros
- Ivory Coast
- Lesotho
- Libya
- Liberia
- Madagascar
- Mauritius
- Seychelles
- Somalia
- Sudan
- Zimbabwe

== Format ==
Qualification ties were played on a home-and-away two-legged basis. If the aggregate score was tied after the second leg, the away goals rule would be applied, and if still tied, the penalty shoot-out (no extra time) would be used to determine the winner.

== Schedule ==
Round	Leg	Date
First round	First leg	5–7 August 2021
First round	Second leg	19–21 August 2021
Second round	First leg	23–25 September 2021
Second round	Second leg	7–9 October 2021
Third round	First leg	2–4 December 2021
Third round	Second leg	16–18 December 2021
Fourth round	First leg	21–23 January 2022
Fourth round	Second leg	4–6 February 2022
Fifth round	First leg	12–13 March 2022
Fifth round	Second leg	26–27 March 2022

== First round ==
Team 1	Agg.	Team 2	1st leg	2nd leg
Djibouti	1–6	Eritrea	1–3	0–3
Rwanda	w/o	South Sudan	—	—
Eswatini	0–2	Mozambique	0–0	0–2
Mauritania	w/o	Tunisia	—	—
Niger	2–13	Benin	1–6	1–7
Togo	w/o	Mali	—	—
DR Congo	9–1	São Tomé and Príncipe	5–1	4–0
Equatorial Guinea	w/o	Central African Republic	—	—

15 August 2021
15:00 UTC+3

Djibouti	1–3	Eritrea
Sikieh 63'	Report	Sahle 13', 65'; Nega 45+1'

Abebe Bikila Stadium, Addis Ababa (Ethiopia)
18 August 2021
17:00 UTC+3

Eritrea	3–0	Djibouti
Mehari 47'; Estifanos 73', 86'	Report

Abebe Bikila Stadium, Addis Ababa (Ethiopia)

Eritrea won 6–1 on aggregate.

7 August 2021
14:00 UTC+2

Eswatini	0–0	Mozambique
	Report

Mavuso Sports Centre, Manzini
Referee: Patience Mumba (Zambia)
20 August 2021
15:00 UTC+1

Mozambique	2–0	Eswatini
Mulingandale 20'; Jacinto 35'	Report

Black Bulls Sports Complex, Matola

Mozambique won 2–0 on aggregate.

7 August 2021
14:00 UTC+2

Niger	1–6	Benin
? ?'	Report	Kedokpo ?', ?'; Ahouassou ?', ?'; Inonnabi ?'; Sagbohan ?'

Stade Général Seyni Kountché, Niamey
Referee: Hannah Elaigwu (Nigeria)
20 August 2021
15:00 UTC+1

Benin	7–1	Niger
Sagbohan 3'; Kedokpo 11', 65'; Bernice 31'; Ahouassou 45' (pen.); Kpadonou 56'; Kounasso 75'	Report	Hanjar 48'

Stade Charles de Gaulle, Porto-Novo
Referee: Vincentia Amedome (Togo)

Benin won 13–2 on aggregate.

10 August 2021
14:00 UTC+2

DR Congo	5–1	São Tomé and Príncipe
Luvuezo 27', 77'; Tshilombo 61', 84'; Mafuta 79'	Report	Semedo 55'

Stade TP Mazembe, Lubumbashi
27 August 2021
14:30 UTC+0

São Tomé and Príncipe	0–4	DR Congo
	Report	Mafuta ?'; Kanza ?'; Ngalula ?', ?'

Estádio Nacional 12 de Julho, São Tomé
Referee: Annael Omanda (Gabon)

DR Congo won 9–1 on aggregate.

== Second round ==
Team 1	Agg.	Team 2	1st leg	2nd leg
Eritrea	0–5	Tanzania	0–3	0–2
Burundi	5–0	Namibia	3–0	2–0
Angola	1–8	Botswana	1–4	0–4
Rwanda	0–8	Ethiopia	0–4	0–4
Kenya	3–10	Uganda	2–7	1–3
Mozambique	2–4	South Africa	0–1	2–3
Zambia	8–1	Malawi	6–0	2–1
Mauritania	w/o (Note: Ghana won on walkover and advanced to the third round after Mauritania withdrew before the first leg.)	Ghana	—	—
Benin	3–4	Morocco	1–2	2–2
Gambia	1–1 (4–3 p)	Burkina Faso	0–1	1–0
Mali	3–5	Senegal	2–4	1–1
Guinea	1–1 (3–2 p)	Sierra Leone	0–1	1–0
Gabon	w/o (Note: Gabon won on walkover and advanced to the third round after Guinea-Bissau failed to appear for the first leg.)	Guinea-Bissau	—	—
DR Congo	0–9	Cameroon	0–4	0–5
Egypt	2–4	Congo	1–1	1–3
Central African Republic	0–11	Nigeria	0–7	0–4

Notes:

25 September 2021
16:00 UTC+3

Eritrea	0–3	Tanzania
	Report	Masaka ?', ?'; Luvanga ?'

Stade Asmara, Asmara
9 October 2021
15:00 UTC+3

Tanzania	2–0	Eritrea
Kisisa 55'; Mbunda 84'	Report

Chamazi Stadium, Mbagala

Tanzania won 5–0 on aggregate.

25 September 2021
15:00 UTC+2

Burundi	3–0	Namibia
? ?'; ? ?'; ? ?'	Report

Stade Urukundo, Ngozi
Referee: Florentina Zablon (Tanzania)
8 October 2021
13:00 UTC+2

Namibia	0–2	Burundi
	Report	Nihorimbere 15', 20'

Dobsonville Stadium, Soweto (South Africa)
Referee: Patience Mumba (Zambia)

Burundi won 5–0 on aggregate.

25 September 2021
15:00 UTC+1

Angola	1–4	Botswana
? 58'	Report	? 11' (o.g.); Rathari 16'; Dithebe 61'; Manewe 66'

Estádio dos Coqueiros, Luanda
9 October 2021
16:00 UTC+2

Botswana	4–0	Angola
Rathari 13', 77'; Dithebe 23'; Motlogelwa 36' (pen.)	Report

Francistown Stadium, Francistown
Referee: Vistoria Shangula (Namibia)

Botswana won 8–1 on aggregate.

24 September 2021
15:00 UTC+2

Rwanda	0–4	Ethiopia
	Report	Assresahagn 19', 27'; Kalsa 56'; Lemma 61'

Nyamirambo Regional Stadium, Kigali
6 October 2021
16:00 UTC+3

Ethiopia	4–0	Rwanda
Temesgen 33'; Lemma 41'; Kalsa 57', 57'	Report

Bahir Dar Stadium, Bahir Dar

Ethiopia won 8–0 on aggregate.

25 September 2021
15:00 UTC+3

Kenya	2–7	Uganda
Opisa 61', 79'	Report	Nalukenge 2', 39'; Kunihira 18'; Najjemba 21'; Nalugya 26' (pen.); Komuntale 45+1', 88'

Nyayo National Stadium, Nairobi
Referee: Asnakech Gebire (Ethiopia)
8 October 2021
16:00 UTC+3

Uganda	3–1	Kenya
Kunihira 15'; Nandago 38'; Nalukenge 90'	Report	Oside 21' (pen.)

St. Mary's Stadium, Entebbe
Referee: Suavis Iratunga (Burundi)

Uganda won 10–3 on aggregate.

23 September 2021
15:00 UTC+2

Mozambique	0–1	South Africa
	Report	Vilakazi 36'

Black Bulls Sports Complex, Matola
8 October 2021
16:00 UTC+2

South Africa	3–2	Mozambique
Hadebe 13', 29', 82'	Report	Mulingandale 17', 40'

Dobsonville Stadium, Soweto

South Africa won 4–2 on aggregate.

24 September 2021
15:00 UTC+2

Zambia	6–0	Malawi
Phiri 21', 25', 69' (pen.); Katongo 37'; Mapepa 48'; Namasiku 77'	Report

Nkoloma Stadium, Lusaka
Referee: Letticia Viana (Eswatini)
9 October 2021
15:00 UTC+2

Malawi	1–2	Zambia
Kabzere 3'	Report	Phiri 7'; Namasiku 38'

Bingu National Stadium, Lilongwe
Referee: Akhona Makalima (South Africa)

Zambia won 8–1 on aggregate.

25 September 2021
16:00 UTC+1

Benin	1–2	Morocco
Sadikou 56'	Report	Bouftini 29'; Jawad 35'

Stade Charles de Gaulle, Porto-Novo
Referee: Juliet Appiah (Ghana)
9 October 2021
17:00 UTC+1

Morocco	2–2	Benin
El Yamani 38'; Mssalfyam 82'	Report	Sadikou 70' (pen.); Kadidjath 90+2'

Stade Moulay Hassan, Rabat
Referee: Aïssatou Kanté (Guinea)

Morocco won 4–3 on aggregate.

24 September 2021
16:00 UTC+0

Gambia	0–1	Burkina Faso
	Report	Kabré 77'

Independence Stadium, Bakau
9 October 2021
16:00 UTC+1

Burkina Faso	0–1	Gambia
	Report	Colley 71'
Penalties
Penalty scored Penalty missed	3–4	Kuyateh (penalty missed); Y. Jarju (penalty scored); K. Jarju (penalty missed); Wally (penalty scored); Colley (penalty scored); Jammeh (penalty scored)

Stade Charles de Gaulle, Porto-Novo (Benin)

1–1 on aggregate. Gambia won 4–3 on penalties.

25 September 2021
16:30 UTC+0

Mali	2–4	Senegal
Coulibaly 45+1', 89'	Report	Diallo 19', 29', 77'; M'Bodji 90+4'

Stade Modibo Kéïta, Bamako
7 October 2021
17:00 UTC+0

Senegal	1–1	Mali
Diallo 90+2'	Report	Coulibaly 24'

Stade Al Djigo, Pikine

Senegal won 5–3 on aggregate.

25 September 2021
16:00 UTC+0

Guinea	0–1	Sierra Leone
	Report	Turay 17'

Stade Al Djigo, Pikine (Senegal)
Referee: Ana Maria Lopes (Cape Verde)
9 October 2021
16:00 UTC+0

Sierra Leone	0–1	Guinea
	Report	Kouroum 4'
Penalties
	2–3

Antoinette Tubman Stadium, Monrovia (Liberia)
Referee: Sylvina Garnett (Liberia)

1–1 on aggregate. Guinea won 3–2 on penalties.

25 September 2021
15:30 UTC+1

DR Congo	0–4	Cameroon
	Report	Aboudi 28'; Lamine 45'; Ebika 58'; Enganemben 86'

Stade des Martyrs, Kinshasa
Referee: Annael Omanda (Gabon)
9 October 2021
15:30 UTC+1

Cameroon	5–0	DR Congo
Kome 29'; Aboudi 43'; Tabe 50', 53'; Enganemben 79'	Report

Stade Ahmadou Ahidjo, Yaoundé
Referee: Chancelle Ngakosso (Congo)

Cameroon won 9–0 on aggregate.

25 September 2021
18:00 UTC+2

Egypt	1–1	Congo
Magdy ?'	Report	Mbayo ?'

Cairo
9 October 2021
14:30 UTC+1

Congo	3–1	Egypt
Yamounou 30', 52'; Senga 32'	Report	Dana Karim 78'

Stade Alphonse Massemba-Débat, Brazzaville

Congo won 4–2 on aggregate.

25 September 2021
15:00 UTC+1

Central African Republic	0–7	Nigeria
	Report	Idoko 2', 5' (pen.); Onyenezide 34'; Jerry 44'; Abiodun 78'; Lawal 83'; Yina 90+1'

Japoma Stadium, Douala (Cameroon)
6 October 2021
16:00 UTC+1

Nigeria	4–0	Central African Republic
Sabastine 13'; Idoko 35', 51'; Okpe 87'	Report

Onikan Stadium, Lagos
Referee: Naffisa Sani (Niger)

Nigeria won 11–0 on aggregate.

== Third round ==
Team 1	Agg.	Team 2	1st leg	2nd leg
Tanzania	4–3	Burundi	3–2	1–1
Botswana	2–8	Ethiopia	1–3	1–5
Uganda	1–0	South Africa	1–0	0–0
Zambia	0–1	Ghana	0–0	0–1
Morocco	9–1	Gambia	3–1	6–0
Senegal	3–3 (a)	Guinea	2–0	1–3
Cameroon	w/o (Note: Cameroon won on walkover and advanced to the fourth round after Gabon withdrew before the first leg.)	Gabon	—	—
Congo	w/o (Note: Nigeria won on walkover and advanced to the fourth round after Congo withdrew before the second leg in Nigeria citing travel challenges.)	Nigeria	0–4	—

4 December 2021
15:00 UTC+3

Tanzania	3–2	Burundi
Luvanga 9'; Lema 15'; Masaka 44'	Report	Gakima 22'; Izakoze 57'

Chamazi Stadium, Dar es Salaam
18 December 2021
15:00 UTC+2

Burundi	1–1	Tanzania
? 13'	Report	Mdimu 8'

Stade Urukundo, Ngozi

Tanzania won 4–3 on aggregate.

3 December 2021
18:00 UTC+2

Botswana	1–3	Ethiopia
Manewe 57'	Report	Odong 35'; Assresahagn 43'; Temesgen 82' (pen.)

Francistown Stadium, Francistown
17 December 2021
16:00 UTC+3

Ethiopia	5–1	Botswana
Thomas 27' (o.g.); Odong 30'; Assresahagn 33', 37'; Motlogelwa 57' (o.g.)	Report	Mosotho 86'

Abebe Bikila Stadium, Addis Ababa

Ethiopia won 8–2 on aggregate.

3 December 2021
15:00 UTC+3

Uganda	1–0	South Africa
Nandago 19'	Report

St. Mary's Stadium, Entebbe
Referee: Tsehaynesh Abebe (Ethiopia)
17 December 2021
15:00 UTC+2

South Africa	0–0	Uganda
	Report

Dobsonville Stadium, Johannesburg

Uganda won 1–0 on aggregate.

4 December 2021
15:00 UTC+2

Zambia	0–0	Ghana
	Report

Nkoloma Stadium, Lusaka
Referee: Akhona Makalima (South Africa)
18 December 2021
15:00 UTC+0

Ghana	1–0	Zambia
Badu 35'	Report

Cape Coast Sports Stadium, Cape Coast

Ghana won 1–0 on aggregate.

6 December 2021
17:00 UTC+1

Morocco	3–1	Gambia
Bouftini 2'; Mahy 15' (pen.); El Amrani 55'	Report	Jammeh 56'

Stade Moulay Hassan, Rabat
Referee: Mame Coumba Faye (Senegal)
12 December 2021
17:00 UTC+1

Gambia	0–6	Morocco
	Report	Bouftini 2', 15', 56'; Mahy 45+2'; Jbilou 74'; El Yamani 90+1'

Stade Moulay Hassan, Rabat (Morocco)
Referee: Hamidou Diero (Burkina Faso)

Morocco won 9–1 on aggregate.

4 December 2021
17:00 UTC+0

Senegal	2–0	Guinea
M'Bodji 65'; A. N'Diaye 89'	Report

Stade Lat-Dior, Thiès
Referee: Aïssata Boudy Lam (Mauritania)
18 December 2021
16:00 UTC+0

Guinea	3–1	Senegal
Sylla 8'; F. Camara 45+1'; N. Camara 90+2'	Report	W. Ndiaye 49'

Stade du 28 Septembre, Conakry
Referee: Rakiatou Fofana (Mali)

3–3 on aggregate. Senegal won on away goals.

5 December 2021
15:30 UTC+1

Congo	0–4	Nigeria
	Report	Idoko 38'; Sabastine 47'; Onyenezide 50' (pen.); Abiodun 55'

Stade Alphonse Massamba Debat, Brazzaville
17 December 2021
14:00 UTC+1

Nigeria	Cancelled	Congo
	Report

Mobolaji Johnson Arena, Lagos

Nigeria won on walkover after Congo withdrew from the second leg in Nigeria.

== Fourth round ==
Team 1	Agg.	Team 2	1st leg	2nd leg
Tanzania	1–2	Ethiopia	1–0	0–2
Uganda	1–7	Ghana	1–2	0–5
Morocco	2–2 (4–5 p)	Senegal	1–1	1–1
Cameroon	0–3	Nigeria	0–0	0–3

23 January 2022
16:00 UTC+3

Tanzania	1–0	Ethiopia
Bahera 64'	Report

Amaan Stadium, Zanzibar
4 February 2022
16:00 UTC+3

Ethiopia	2–0	Tanzania
Assresahagn 31', 76'	Report

Abebe Bikila Stadium, Addis Ababa

Ethiopia won 2–1 on aggregate.

22 January 2022
16:00 UTC+3

Uganda	1–2	Ghana
Najjemba 86' (pen.)	Report	Abdulai 20'; Animah 48'

St. Mary's Stadium-Kitende, Entebbe
Referee: Lidya Tafesse (Ethiopia)
5 February 2022
15:00 UTC+0

Ghana	5–0	Uganda
Badu 23'; Abdulai 26'; Jafaru 82'; Boaduwaa 88', 90+3'	Report

Cape Coast Sports Stadium, Cape Coast
Referee: Patience Madu (Nigeria)

Ghana won 7–1 on aggregate.

22 January 2022
17:00 UTC+1

Morocco	1–1	Senegal
Bouftini 41'	Report	Diallo 19'

Stade Moulay Hassan, Rabat
Referee: Dorsaf Ganouati (Tunisia)
5 February 2022
16:30 UTC+0

Senegal	1–1	Morocco
Diallo 33'	Report	El Chad 49'
Penalties
	5–4

Stade Lat-Dior, Thiès

2–2 on aggregate. Senegal won 5–4 on penalties.

22 January 2022
15:30 UTC+1

Cameroon	0–0	Nigeria
	Report

Stade de la Réunification, Douala
5 February 2022
16:00 UTC+1

Nigeria	3–0	Cameroon
Onyenezide 20', 72'; Vincent 37'	Report

Moshood Abiola National Stadium, Abuja
Referee: Vincentia Amedome (Togo)

Nigeria won 3–0 on aggregate.

== Fifth round ==
Team 1	Agg.	Team 2	1st leg	2nd leg
Ethiopia	1–5	Ghana	0–3	1–2
Senegal	2–7	Nigeria	1–3	1–4

13 March 2022
16:00 UTC+3

Ethiopia	0–3	Ghana
	Report	Abdulai 29', 38'; Nyama 44'

Abebe Bikila Stadium, Addis Ababa
Referee: Florentina Zablon (Tanzania)
27 March 2022
15:00 UTC+0

Ghana	2–1	Ethiopia
Abdulai 3', 25'	Report	Temesgen 30'

Accra Sports Stadium, Accra
Referee: Aurore Ligan (Benin)

Ghana won 5–1 on aggregate.

12 March 2022
16:30 UTC+0

Senegal	1–3	Nigeria
A. N'Diaye 89' (pen.)	Report	Sabastine 8', 56', 62' (pen.)

Stade Lat-Dior, Thiès
Referee: Vincentia Amedome (Togo)
26 March 2022
16:00 UTC+1

Nigeria	4–1	Senegal
Sabastine 7', 20'; Onyenezide 25' (pen.); Jerry 89'	Report	A. N'Diaye 45' (pen.)

Samuel Ogbemudia Stadium, Benin City
Referee: Letticia Viana (Eswatini)

Nigeria won 7–2 on aggregate.

== Qualified teams for FIFA U-20 Women's World Cup ==
The following two teams from CAF qualified for the 2022 FIFA U-20 Women's World Cup.

Team	Qualified on	Previous appearances in FIFA U-20 Women's World Cup^{1}
Nigeria	26 March 2022	9 (2002, 2004, 2006, 2008, 2010, 2012, 2014, 2016, 2018)
Ghana	27 March 2022	5 (2010, 2012, 2014, 2016, 2018)

^{1} Bold indicates champions for that year. Italic indicates hosts for that year.

== Qualified teams for 2023 African Games ==
The following eight teams from CAF qualified for the 2023 African Games women's football tournament by virtue of qualifying into the Fourth Round of the Tournament.

Team	Qualified on	Previous appearances in African Games^{1}
Morocco	12 December 2021	1 (2019)
Ethiopia	17 December 2021	2 (2003, 2007)
Nigeria	17 December 2021	4 (**2003**, **2007**, 2015, **2019**)
Uganda	17 December 2021	0 (debut)
Cameroon	18 December 2021	4 (2003, **2011**, 2015, 2019)
Ghana	18 December 2021	3 (2007, 2011, **2015**)
Senegal	18 December 2021	1 (2007)
Tanzania	18 December 2021	2 (2011, 2015)

^{1} Bold indicates champions for that year. Italic indicates hosts for that year.

== Goalscorers ==
There were 206 goals scored in 61 matches, for an average of 3.38 goals per match.

7 goals

- (Ethiopia) Rediet Assresahagn
- (Nigeria) Flourish Sabastine

6 goals

- (Ghana) Salamatu Abdulai
- (Morocco) Sofia Bouftini
- (Senegal) Hapsatou Diallo

5 goals

- (Nigeria) Mercy Idoko
- (Nigeria) Esther Onyenezide

4 goals

- (Benin) Edwige Kedokpo
- (Zambia) Enelesi Phiri

3 goals

- (Benin) Marguerite Ahouassou
- (Botswana) Obonetse Rathari
- (Ethiopia) Aregash Kalsa
- (Ethiopia) Mesay Temesgen
- (Mali) Rokia Coulibaly
- (Mozambique) Elsa Mulingandale
- (Senegal) Adji N'Diaye
- (South Africa) Asanda Hadebe
- (Tanzania) Aisha Masaka
- (Uganda) Juliet Nalukenge

2 goals

- (Benin) Bernice Inonnabi
- (Benin) Milhad Sadikou
- (Benin) Eunice Sagbohan
- (Botswana) Keitumetse Dithebe
- (Botswana) Peggy Manewe
- (Burundi) Divine Nihorimbere
- (Cameroon) Jennifer Aboudi
- (Cameroon) Annie Enganemben
- (Cameroon) Brenda Tabe
- (Republic of the Congo) Aïcha Yamounou
- (Democratic Republic of the Congo) Grâce Luvuezo
- (Democratic Republic of the Congo) Ememiya Mafuta
- (Democratic Republic of the Congo) Deborah Ngalula
- (Democratic Republic of the Congo) Olga Tshilombo
- (Eritrea) Diana Estifanos
- (Eritrea) Delina Sahle
- (Ethiopia) Turist Lemma
- (Ethiopia) Araiet Odong
- (Ghana) Evelyn Badu
- (Ghana) Doris Boaduwaa
- (Kenya) Shaylene Opisa
- (Morocco) Anfal El Yamani
- (Morocco) Kawtar Mahy
- (Nigeria) Deborah Abiodun
- (Nigeria) Joy Jerry
- (Senegal) Coumba M'Bodji
- (Tanzania) Clara Luvanga
- (Uganda) Sumaya Komuntale
- (Uganda) Margret Kunihira
- (Uganda) Fauzia Najjemba
- (Uganda) Hadijah Nandago
- (Zambia) Lungowe Namasiku

1 goal

- (Angola) ?
- (Benin) Imorou Kadidjath
- (Benin) Kpènagni Kounasso
- (Benin) Joëlle Kpadonou
- (Botswana) Lorato Motlogelwa
- (Botswana) Tshegofatso Mosotho
- (Burkina Faso) Naomi Kabré
- (Burundi) Estella Gakima
- (Burundi) Noela Izakoze
- (Burundi) ?
- (Burundi) ?
- (Burundi) ?
- (Burundi) ?
- (Cameroon) Thade Ebika
- (Cameroon) Fatima Kome
- (Cameroon) Mana Lamine
- (Republic of the Congo) Pauline Mbayo
- (Republic of the Congo) Doris Senga
- (Djibouti) Lerman Sikieh
- (Democratic Republic of the Congo) Kamba Kanza
- (Egypt) Dana Nadda
- (Egypt) Mai Magdy
- (Eritrea) Misgana Mehari
- (Eritrea) Rahwa Nega
- (The Gambia) Wuday Colley
- (The Gambia) Fatoumata Jammeh
- (Ghana) Grace Animah
- (Ghana) Rahama Jafaru
- (Ghana) Cecilia Nyama
- (Guinea) Fanta Camara
- (Guinea) Nana Camara
- (Guinea) Boh Saran Kouroum
- (Guinea) N’nabinty Sylla
- (Kenya) Peris Oside
- (Malawi) Rose Kabzere
- (Morocco) Oumayma El Amrani
- (Morocco) Nesryne El Chad
- (Morocco) Nassima Jawad
- (Morocco) Hajar Jbilou
- (Morocco) Sara Mssalfyam
- (Mozambique) Nadia Jacinto
- (Niger) Naïma Hanjar
- (Niger) ?
- (Nigeria) Taiwo Lawal
- (Nigeria) Blessing Okpe
- (Nigeria) Precious Vincent
- (Nigeria) Philomina Yina
- (Senegal) Walimata N'Diaye
- (São Tomé and Príncipe) Milena Semedo
- (Sierra Leone) Fatmata Turay
- (South Africa) Zethembiso Vilakazi
- (Tanzania) Christer Bahera
- (Tanzania) Irene Kisisa
- (Tanzania) Joyce Lema
- (Tanzania) Protasia Mbunda
- (Tanzania) Emeliana Mdimu
- (Uganda) Shamirah Nalugya
- (Zambia) Evarine Katongo
- (Zambia) Siomala Mapepa

1 own goal

- (Angola) ? (against Botswana)
- (Botswana) Lorato Motlogelwa (against Ethiopia)
- (Botswana) Keitumetse Thomas (against Ethiopia)

== See also ==
- 2022 Women's Africa Cup of Nations
- 2022 African U-17 Women's World Cup Qualifying Tournament
