= Sofia Bouftini =

Moroccan footballer

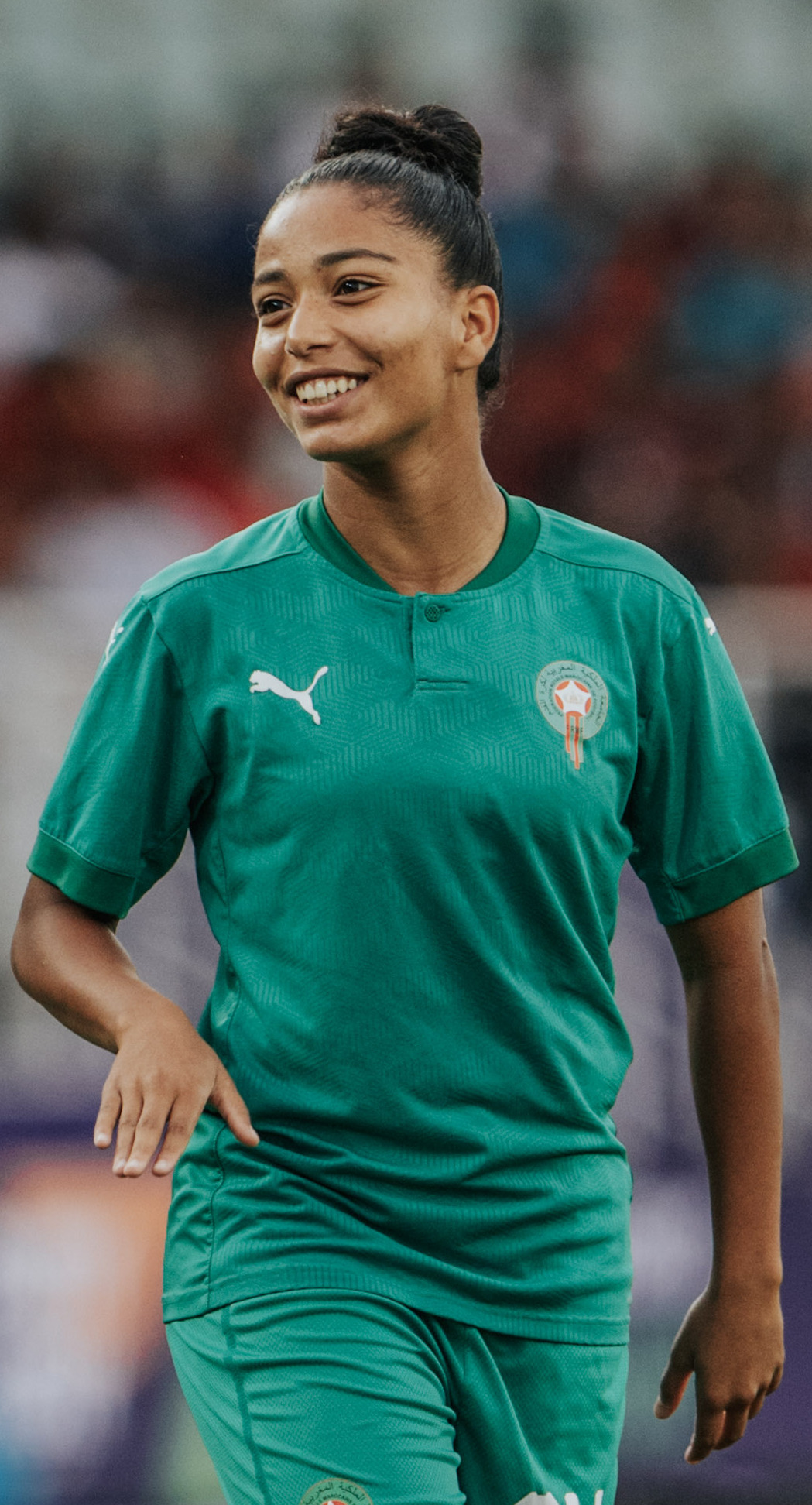
- Bouftini with Morocco at the 2022 Women's Africa Cup of Nations

Personal information
- Date of birth: 25 January 2002 (age 24)
- Place of birth: Khénifra, Morocco
- Height: 1.59 m (5 ft 3 in)
- Position: Midfielder

Youth career
- CA Khénifra

Senior career*
Years	Team	Apps	(Gls)
2021–2023	AS FAR		
2022–2023	RS Berkane (loan)		
2023–	SCC Mohammédia	12	(2)

International career
2019–2022	Morocco U20	24	(12)
2023–	Morocco U23	1	(0)
2022–	Morocco	13	(0)
- * Club domestic league appearances and goals

Sofia Bouftini (Arabic: صوفيا بوفتيني; born 25 January 2002) is a Moroccan professional footballer who plays as a midfielder for SCC Mohammédia and the Morocco women's national team.

== Club career ==
Bouftini began her career with CA Khenifra before moving to AS FAR for the 2021–2022 season.

With AS FAR, Bouftini played in the first edition of the CAF Women's Champions League which took place in Egypt. She participated in all of the matches except for the semi-final against Sekondi Haskas of Ghana. She recorded an assist for Ghizlane Chebbak in the third-place match against Malabo Kings. She also won the 2021-22 Moroccan Women's Championship with AS FAR.

In 2022, Bouftini joined the club Renaissance Berkane, who play in the Moroccan Second Division, on loan from AS FAR.

== International career ==
=== Morocco U-20 ===
Bouftini has capped over 20 times with the Morocco Women's U-20 team. She played in the 2019 African Games in Rabat, in which Morocco finished third in the women's championship. She competed in the UNAF U-20 Women's Tournament, which Morocco won.

Bouftini played in qualification for 2022 FIFA U-20 Women's World Cup. After eliminating Benin and Gambia, Morocco were knocked out by Senegal on penalties in February 2022, during the pen-ultimate round. She scored six goals throughout qualification, including a hat trick against Gambia.

=== Morocco ===
Bouftini was first called up to national team training in 2021 by Reynald Pedros when Morocco faced Spain in an October 2021 friendly. Bouftini did not participate in the match.

She played for the first time with the first team on 8 April 2022 against Gambia. She provided an assist to her teammate Iman Saud.

Bouftini was part of the 26-woman squad that was selected to participate at the 2022 Women's Africa Cup of Nations in Morocco. She did not play in any of the matches of the competition.

In preparation for the 2023 Women's World Cup, Pedros selected Bouftini to take part in the training camp in Spain in October 2022. Morocco faced the national teams of Poland and Canada. She played the second match against Canada, coming on as a substitute for Anissa Belkacemi in the 65th minute. She was called up to the next training camp where Morocco faced Ireland in a double-friendly.

She was included in the squad for the 2023 Women's World Cup. She appeared as a substitute in all four of Morocco's matches.
