= Olga Tshilombo =

DR Congolese footballer (born 2002)

Personal information
- Full name: Olga Kalamba Tshilombo
- Date of birth: 24 April 2002 (age 24)
- Place of birth: Lubumbashi, DR Congo
- Position: Forward

Team information
- Current team: La Solana
- Number: 22

Senior career*
Years	Team	Apps	(Gls)
2022	Yanga Princess		
2023	Dudullu Spor	8	(0)
2023–	La Solana	11	(2)

International career
2022	DR Congo U-20		
- * Club domestic league appearances and goals as of 26 November 2023

Olga Kalamba Tshilombo (born 24 April 2002) is a DR Congolese footballer who plays as a forward for Spanish Segunda Federación club La Solana. She capped for the DR Congo women's national under-20 team.

== Club career ==
Tshilombo played for Yanga Princess in Tanzania in 2022. In the 2022–23 season of Greek Women's Premier League.

In January 2023, she moved to Turkey, and signed with the Istanbul-based club Dudullu Spor to play in the 2022–23 Super League season.

== International career ==
Tshilombo was a member of the DR Congo women's national under-20 football team, and took part in the 2022 African U-20 Women's World Cup Qualifying Tournament.
