= Lamine Sadio =

Senegalese footballer (born 2007)

Personal information
- Full name: Mamadou Lamine Sadio
- Date of birth: 24 December 2007 (age 18)
- Place of birth: Senegal
- Height: 1.77 m (5 ft 10 in)
- Position: Midfielder

Team information
- Current team: FC Nordsjælland
- Number: 37

Youth career
- Environnement Foot Thiès

Senior career*
Years	Team	Apps	(Gls)
2026–	FC Nordsjælland	17	(2)

International career^{‡}
2023–2024	Senegal U17	9	(1)
2024	Senegal U20	1	(1)
- * Club domestic league appearances and goals as of 21:03, 9 October 2026 (UTC) ‡ National team caps and goals as of 7 March 2024

Mamadou Lamine Sadio (born 24 December 2007) is a Senegalese footballer. He currently plays for Danish Superliga club FC Nordsjælland as a midfielder.

== Career ==
Sadio signed a pre-contract with FC Nordsjælland in September 2024 at age 16, expected to join the club during the 2025–26 winter transfer window. At the time of signing, he played for Environnement Foot Thiès, a football academy located in Thiès, Senegal.

Sadio officially joined FC Nordsjælland in December 2025 on a contract until 2030. He made an unofficial debut in Nordsjælland's friendly against Czech National Football League club FC Zbrojovka Brno on 30 January 2026, scoring the lone goal in a 1–0 exhibition win. After sitting on the bench in two of three Danish Superliga matches for Nordsjælland in February 2026, his debut came on 1 March against Viborg. He was substituted into the match to begin the second half for his professional debut. In the 62nd minute, he scored to equalise the match 1–1. Viborg would ultimately win the match.

== International career ==
Sadio took part of Senegal under-17 team during the 2023 U-17 Africa Cup of Nations. The team went on to win the tournament, defeating Morocco 2–1 in the final. In November 2023, he was selected the under-17 team ahead of the 2023 FIFA U-17 World Cup. He made one appearance for the Senegal U20 team during the 2024 African Games, scoring the only goal in a 1–0 win over South Sudan U20. He finished his inaugural season with two goals from 10 appearances, as the club finished in third place.

== Career statistics ==
As of match played 15 October 2026

Appearances and goals by club, season and competition
Club	Season	League			Cup		Continental		Total	
Club	Season	Division	Apps	Goals	Apps	Goals	Apps	Goals	Apps	Goals
FC Nordsjælland	2025–26	Danish Superliga	10	2	—		—		10	2
FC Nordsjælland	2026–27	Danish Superliga	7	0	1	1	5 (Note: Appearances in UEFA Conference League)	1	13	2
Career total			17	2	1	1	5	1	23	4

== Honours ==
Senegal U17

- U-17 Africa Cup of Nations: 2023
