= WAFU Zone B U20 Women's Cup =

WAFU B U20 Women's Cup
- Founded: 2023
- Region: West Africa
- Teams: 7
- Current champions: Nigeria 1st title
- Most championships: Ghana; Nigeria (1 title each)
- Website: ufoawafub.com
- 2025 WAFU Zone B U-20 Women's Cup

The WAFU Zone B U20 Women's Cup is a women's association football competition contested by national teams of Zone B of the West African Football Union. The tournament was inaugurated in 2023 and is held biennially.

The first edition took place from 20 May to 3 June 2023 in Kumasi, Ghana, with seven participating teams.

== Tournament history ==
Year	Host	Final			Third place match		
Year	Host	Winner	Score	Runner-up	Third place	Score	Fourth place
2023; Details	Ghana	Ghana	(3–2 P) 1–1	Nigeria	Burkina Faso	2–1	Benin
2025; Details	Benin	Nigeria	2–0	Ghana	Not held		

== Participating nations ==
Legend

- 1st – Champions
- 2nd – Runners-up
- 3rd – Third place
- 4th – Fourth place
- SF – Losing semi-finals
- QF – Quarter-finals
- GS – Group stage

- Q — Qualified for upcoming tournament
- • – Did not qualify
- × – Withdrew
- – Hosts

Team	2023	2025	Years
Benin	4th	GS	2
Burkina Faso	3rd	—	1
Ghana	1st	2nd	2
Ivory Coast	GS	—	1
Niger	GS	—	1
Nigeria	2nd	1st	2
Togo	GS	—	1
Total (7 Teams)	7	3	
