= 2025 WAFU Zone B U-20 Women's Cup =

U-20 Coupe féminine UFOA Zone B Benin 2025

Tournament details
- Host country: Benin
- City: Avrankou / Adjohoun
- Dates: 3–12 November
- Teams: 3 (from 1 sub-confederation)
- Venues: 2 (in 2 host cities)

Final positions
- Champions: Nigeria (2nd title)
- Runners-up: Ghana
- Third place: Benin

Tournament statistics
- Matches played: 6
- Goals scored: 15 (2.5 per match)
- Top scorer: (Nigeria) Ramotalahi Kareem (4 goals)
- All statistics correct as of 12 November 2025.

The 2025 WAFU Zone B U-20 Women's Cup was the second edition of the WAFU Zone B U20 Women's Cup, an international women's youth football competition contested by under-20 national teams of the West African Football Union Zone B. The tournament was hosted in Benin from 3 to 12 November 2025.

== Venues ==
| Location | Stadium | Capacity |
|---|---|---|
| Avrankou | S.O. Avrankou | — |
| Adjohoun | S.O. Adjohoun | — |

== Teams ==
| Team | App | Last | Best placement |
|---|---|---|---|
| Benin | 2nd | 2023 | 3rd (2025) |
| Ghana | 2nd | 2023 | 2nd (2025) |
| Nigeria | 2nd | 2023 | Champions (2025) |

== Final standings ==
| Pos | Team | Pld | W | D | L | GF | GA | GD | Pts | Qualification |
|---|---|---|---|---|---|---|---|---|---|---|
| 1 | Nigeria (C) | 4 | 4 | 0 | 0 | 10 | 1 | +9 | 12 | Champions |
| 2 | Ghana | 4 | 2 | 0 | 2 | 4 | 5 | −1 | 6 | |
| 3 | Benin (H) | 4 | 0 | 0 | 4 | 0 | 8 | −8 | 0 | |

Updated to match(es) played on unknown. Source: WAFU B
(C) Champions; (H) Hosts

== Awards ==
- Top scorer: Ramotalahi Kareem (Nigeria, 4 goals)
- Champion: Nigeria

== Match results ==
7 November 2025
10:00

| Benin | 0–2 | Ghana |
|---|---|---|
| | | Owusu Ansah 11'; Sarah Nyakor 77' |

S.O. Avrankou
8 November 2025
10:00

| Ghana | 0–3 | Nigeria |
|---|---|---|
| | | Jenat Akeremkowei 17'; Alaba Olabiyi 24'; Ramotalahi Kareem 61' |

S.O. Adjohoun
9 November 2025
10:00

| Benin | 0–1 | Nigeria |
|---|---|---|
| | | Ramotalahi Kareem 16' |

S.O. Avrankou
10 November 2025
10:00

| Ghana | 2–0 | Benin |
|---|---|---|
| Sarah Nyarko 14'; Lafita Musah 90+2' |

S.O. Adjohoun
11 November 2025
10:00

| Nigeria | 2–0 | Ghana |
|---|---|---|
| Ramotalahi Kareem 22'; Jenat Akeremkowei 78' |

S.O. Avrankou
12 November 2025
10:00

| Benin | 0–4 | Nigeria |
|---|---|---|
| | | Ramotalahi Kareem 16', 45'; Alaba Olabiyi 67'; Jenat Akeremkowei 88' |

S.O. Adjohoun
