= Catherine Nagadya =

Ugandan footballer

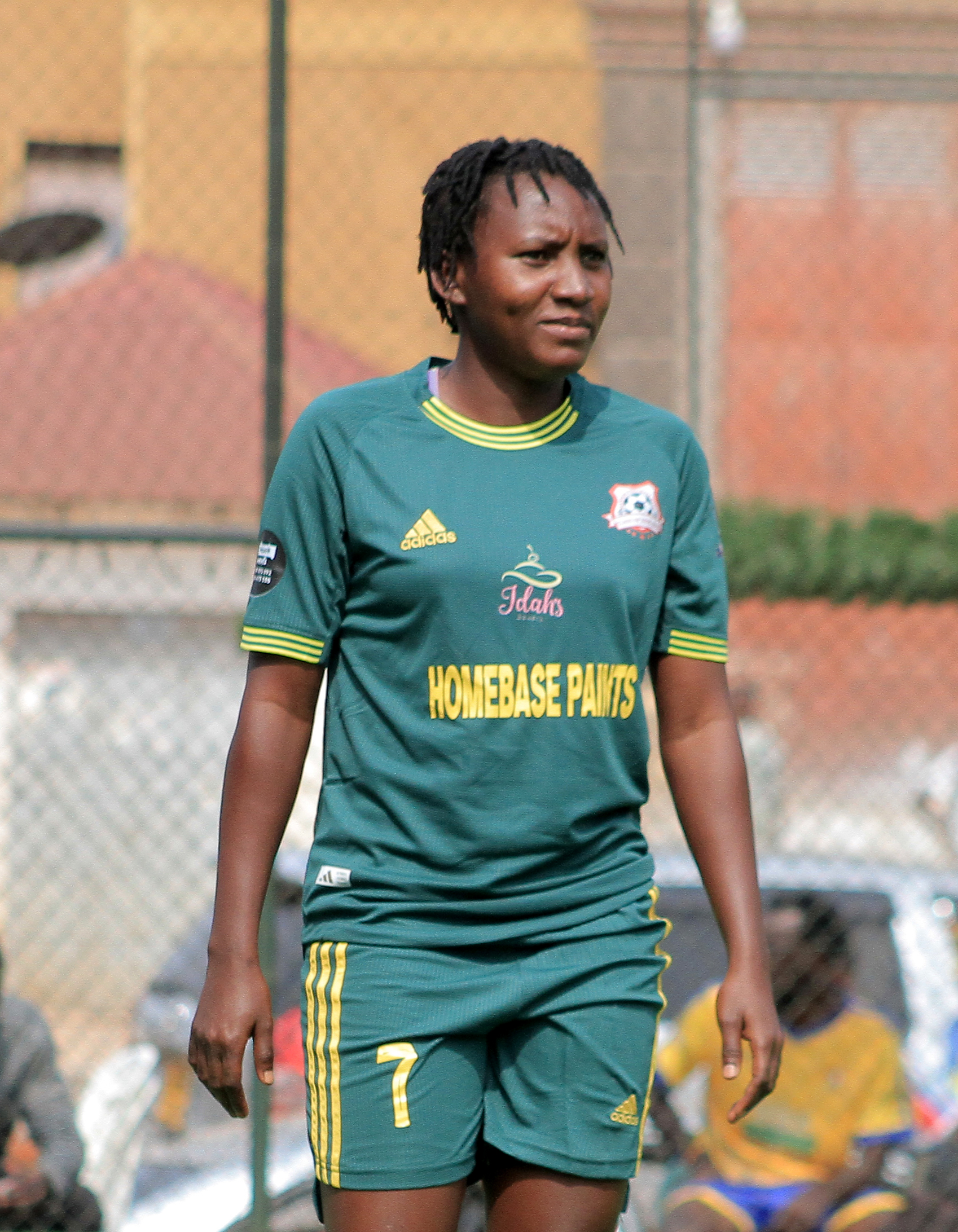

Personal information
- Full name: Catherine Nagadya
- Date of birth: 3 March 2005 (age 21)
- Height: 1.51 m (4 ft 11 in)
- Position: Winger

Team information
- Current team: Al Ahly FC Women

Senior career*
Years	Team	Apps	(Gls)
2018-2019	Makerere University WFC		
2019-2023	Uganda Martyrs LFC	58	(20)
2023-2026	Kampala Queens FC	47	(22)

International career
- Uganda U17
- Uganda U20
	Uganda	28	(1)
- * Club domestic league appearances and goals

Catherine Nagadya (born 3 March 2005) is a Ugandan professional footballer who plays as a winger for Al Ahly FC Women in the Egyptian Women's Premier League and the Uganda women's national team.

== Early life and education ==
Catherine started playing football at the age of 8 while in Primary 3. She went to Entebbe Marine Base Primary School for her primary education and Katuuso Community SS – Buziga and Uganda Martyrs High School – Lubaga for secondary school.

== Club career ==
In 2019, Nagadya helped Makerere University Women FC beat Lady Doves 2–0 in Lugogo to lift the FUFA Women Cup at the age of 14 before joining Uganda Matryrs' Lubaga.

In the 2022/23, Nagadya captained Uganda Martyrs Lubaga WFC to their first ever FUFA Women cup when she scored the only goal in the final against She Maroons FC. She was subsequently name the Most Valuable PLayer(MVP) of the tournament.

In 2023, Catherine joined Kampala Queens FC where they won the FUFA Women Super League title and the FUFA Women Cup in 2026.

In July 2026, Catherine joined Al Ahly from Kampala Capital City Authority Woman Football Club.

== International career ==
Nagadya progressed through Uganda's national football team system, representing the country at the under-17 and under-20 levels before earning selection to the senior women's national team, the Crested Cranes.

In 2019, she was part of the team that won the U-17 COSAFA and U-17 CECAFA Championships.

On 7 July 2023, Nagadya scored her first goal for the senior national team on her debut as Uganda defeated Tanzania 3–1 in an international friendly match played at Lugogo.

== Honours ==
Nagadya has won several youth and women's football titles throughout her career, including the Watoto Wasoka Christmas Camp championships in 2016, 2017 and 2018, the Sseninde Women Development Cup, the Airtel Rising Stars U-17 titles in 2015, 2016, 2017 and 2018, the 2019 and 2026 FUFA Women Cup, the FEASSA Cup, the 2019 U-17 COSAFA Championship and the 2019 U-17 CECAFA Championship.

In 2016, she was named the Most Valuable Player (MVP) of Sseninde Women Development Cup.

== Career statistics ==
Club	Year	Apps	Goals
Makerere Women FC	2018-2019		0
Uganda Martyrs WFC	2019-203	58	20
Kampala Queens FC	2023-2026	47	22
International career
Uganda National Team		28	4
