= Nigeria women's national under-20 football team =

Nigeria Under-20
- Nickname: Falconets
- Association: Nigeria Football Federation
- Confederation: CAF (Africa)
- Sub-confederation: WAFU (West Africa)
- Head coach: Christopher Danjuma
- FIFA code: NGA
First colours	Second colours

First international
- Nigeria 6–0 Mali (Nigeria; 7 April 2002)

Biggest win
- Nigeria 10–0 Sierra Leone (Nigeria; 2014)

Biggest defeat
- Japan 6–0 Nigeria (Port Moresby, Papua New Guinea; 13 November 2016)

African U-20 World Cup qualification
- Appearances: 11 (first in 2002)
- Best result: Champions; Qualified for World Cup (2002, 2004, 2006, 2008, 2010, 2012, 2014, 2015, 2018, 2022, 2024, 2024)

FIFA U-20 Women's World Cup
- Appearances: 12 (first in 2002)
- Best result: Runners-up (2010, 2014)

The Nigeria women's national under-20 football team, nicknamed the Falconets, represents Nigeria in international youth women's football competitions. Its primary role is the development of players in preparation for the senior women's national team. The team competes in a variety of competitions, including the biennial FIFA U-20 Women's World Cup and African U-20 Women's World Cup qualification, which are the top competitions for this age group.

The team has qualified for every edition of the FIFA U-20 Women's World Cup and has been runners-up twice, losing to Germany on both occasions, in 2010 and 2014.

== Fixtures and results ==
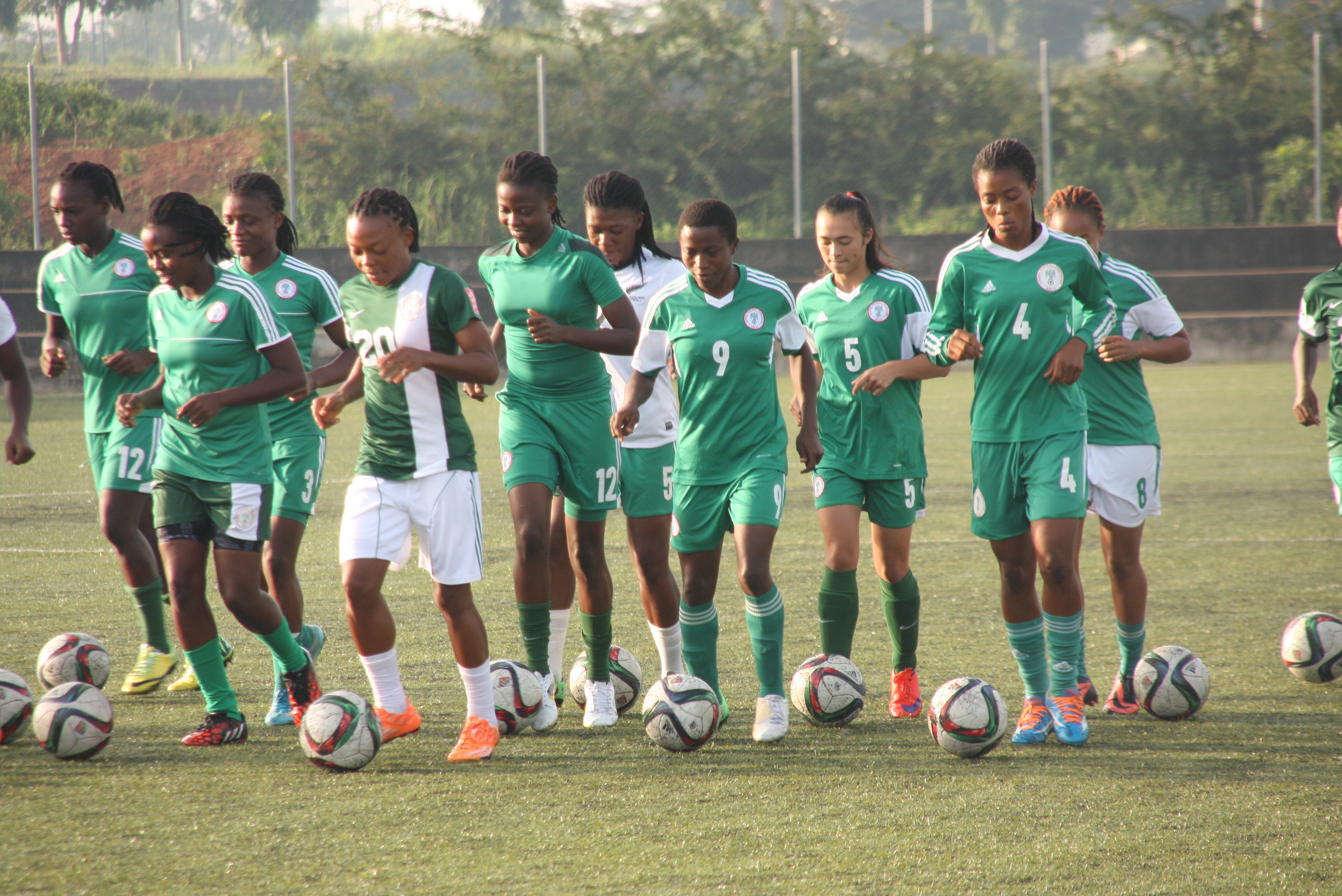
A picture of the Nigeria women's national under-20 football team

Legend

Win Draw Lose Fixture

== Personnel ==
The coaching squad for the 2022 FIFA U-20 Women's World Cup was announced by the Nigeria Football Federation on 14 August 2022.

Position	Name
Head coach	(Nigeria) Christopher Danjuma
Assistant coach	(Nigeria) Olanrewaju Wemimo Matthew
Assistant coach I	(Nigeria) Moses Opuamowei Aduku
Assistant coach II	(Nigeria) Charity Nnedinma Enwere
Assistant coach III	(Nigeria) Bilikis Aina Tijani
Goalkeeping coach	(Nigeria) Yahaya Audu

== Current squad ==
Squad for the 2024 FIFA U-20 Women's World Cup The final squad was announced on 21 August 2024.

Head coach: Christopher Danjuma

No.	Pos.	Player	Date of birth (age)	Caps	Goals	Club
1	GK	Shukura Bakare	14 August 2005 (aged 19)			(Nigeria Football Federation) Nasarawa Amazons
2	FW	Chiamaka Okwuchukwu	7 August 2005 (aged 19)			(Nigeria Football Federation) Rivers Angels
3	FW	Chiamaka Osigwe	26 April 2007 (aged 17)			(Nigeria Football Federation) Edo Queens
4	FW	Mary Nkpa	22 December 2007 (aged 16)			(Nigeria Football Federation) Heartland Queens
5	MF	Shakirat Oyinlola	8 January 2006 (aged 18)			(Royal Spanish Football Federation) La Liga Academy
6	DF	Rofiat Imuran	17 June 2004 (aged 20)			Unattached
7	FW	Flourish Sabastine	20 October 2004 (aged 19)			(French Football Federation) Reims
8	FW	Amina Bello	18 December 2005 (aged 18)			(United States Soccer Federation) Otero Rattlers
9	FW	Janet Akekoromowei	6 November 2007 (aged 16)			(Nigeria Football Federation) Asisat Oshoala Academy
10	MF	Adoo Yina	30 December 2004 (aged 19)			(Nigeria Football Federation) Nasarawa Amazons
11	MF	Olushola Shobowale	20 November 2004 (aged 19)			(Nigeria Football Federation) Nasarawa Amazons
12	DF	Oluchi Ohaegbulem (captain)	18 October 2006 (aged 17)			(Nigeria Football Federation) Nasarawa Amazons
13	DF	Oluwabunmi Oladeji	9 August 2004 (aged 20)			(Nigeria Football Federation) Naija Ratels
14	FW	Opeyemi Ajakaye	30 December 2005 (aged 18)			(Royal Spanish Football Federation) Madrid CFF
15	MF	Chioma Olise	16 March 2005 (aged 19)			(Nigeria Football Federation) Edo Queens
16	GK	Anderline Mgbechi	30 November 2005 (aged 18)			(Nigeria Football Federation) Delta Queens
17	DF	Jumoke Alani	17 July 2005 (aged 19)			(Nigeria Football Federation) Nasarawa Amazons
18	DF	Shukurat Oladipo	22 September 2004 (aged 19)			(Nigeria Football Federation) Robo
19	DF	Comfort Folorunsho	26 January 2006 (aged 18)			(Nigeria Football Federation) Edo Queens
20	MF	Joy Igbokwe	6 March 2006 (aged 18)			(Nigeria Football Federation) Naija Ratels
21	GK	Faith Omilana	1 December 2005 (aged 18)			(Nigeria Football Federation) Naija Ratels

== Competitive record ==
=== FIFA U-20 Women's World Cup record ===
FIFA U-20 Women's World Cup
Year	Result	Pld	W	D	L	GF	GA
(Canada) 2002	Group stage	3	0	1	2	2	5
(Thailand) 2004	Quarter-finals	4	1	2	1	5	5
(Russia) 2006	Quarter-finals	4	2	0	2	12	7
(Chile) 2008	Quarter-finals	4	2	1	1	8	6
(Germany) 2010	Runners-up	6	2	3	1	6	6
(Japan) 2012	Fourth place	6	3	1	2	9	5
(Canada) 2014	Runners-up	6	4	1	1	15	7
(Papua New Guinea) 2016	Group stage	3	2	0	1	5	8
(France) 2018	Quarter-finals	4	1	1	2	3	4
(Costa Rica) 2022	Quarter-finals	4	3	0	1	5	3
(Colombia) 2024	Round of 16	4	2	0	2	7	5
(Poland) 2026	Quarter-finals	5	2	1	2	13	4
Total:12/12	Runners-up	53	24	11	18	90	65

=== African U-20 Women's World Cup Qualification record ===
African U-20 Women's World Cup qualification
Appearances: 11
Year	Round	Position	Pld	W	D	L	GF	GA
2002	Champions	1st	6	6	0	0	19	2
2004	Champions	1st	6	5	1	0	8	0
2006	Qualified for World Cup	1st	4	4	0	0	20	3
2008	Qualified for World Cup	1st	4	4	0	0	9	2
2010	Qualified for World Cup	1st	4	4	0	0	22	4
2012	Qualified for World Cup	1st	4	4	0	0	13	0
2014	Qualified for World Cup	1st	4	4	0	0	15	0
2015	Qualified for World Cup	1st	4	4	0	0	21	3
2018	Qualified for World Cup	1st	4	3	1	0	23	2
2022	Qualified for World Cup	1st	4	4	0	0	25	2
2024	Qualified for World Cup	1st	2	2	0	0	5	2
Total	11/11	11 Titles	45	44	2	0	205	20

=== Football at the African Games record ===
Football at the African Games
Appearances: 2
Year	Round	Position	Pld	W	D	L	GF	GA
(Morocco) 2019	Champions	1st	4	2	2	0	7	1
(Ghana) 2023	Runners-up	2nd	4	3	0	1	10	1
Total	2/2	1 Title	8	5	2	1	17	2

=== WAFU Zone B U-20 Women's Cup ===
WAFU Zone B U20 Women's Cup
Appearances: 2
Year	Round	Position	Pld	W	D	L	GF	GA
(Ghana) 2023	Runners-up	2nd	5	4	1	0	20	1
(Benin) 2025	Champions	1st	4	4	0	0	10	1
Total	2/2	1 Title	9	8	1	0	30	2

== Head-to-head record ==
The following table shows Nigeria's head-to-head record in the FIFA U-20 Women's World Cup.

Opponent	Pld	W	D	L	GF	GA	GD	Win %
Brazil	3	1	1	1	5	5	+0	33.33
Canada	4	3	0	1	9	6	+3	75.00
China	4	0	2	2	1	5	−4	0.00
Chile	1	1	0	0	2	0	+2	100.00
Colombia	1	1	0	0	1	0	+1	100.00
Denmark	1	0	0	1	1	2	−1	0.00
Finland	1	1	0	0	8	0	+8	100.00
England	4	2	2	0	7	3	+4	50.00
France	2	1	0	1	3	3	+0	50.00
Germany	5	0	1	4	2	8	−6	0.00
Haiti	1	1	0	0	1	0	+1	100.00
Italy	2	1	1	0	5	1	+4	50.00
Japan	5	1	1	3	5	12	−7	20.00
Mexico	3	1	2	0	3	2	+1	33.33
Netherlands	1	0	0	1	0	2	−2	0.00
New Caledonia	1	1	0	0	10	1	+9	100.00
New Zealand	2	2	0	0	7	3	+4	100.00
North Korea	1	1	0	0	6	2	+4	100.00
South Korea	4	4	0	0	6	1	+5	100.00
Spain	3	1	0	2	3	5	−2	33.33
United States	2	0	1	1	1	3	−2	0.00
Venezuela	1	1	0	0	4	0	+4	100.00
Total	52	24	11	17	90	64	+26	46.15

== Honours ==
Intercontinental

- U-20 Women's World Cup
  - Runners-up: 2010, 2014
  - Fourth place: 2012

Continental

- African U-20 Women's World Cup qualification
  - Winners: 2002, 2004
  - Qualified for World Cup: 2006, 2008, 2010, 2012, 2014, 2015, 2018, 2022, 2024
- Football at the African Games
  - Gold medalists: 2019
- WAFU Zone B U20 Women's Cup
  - Champions: 2025

== See also ==
- Nigeria women's national football team
