= Alpha Thiery Ssali =

Ugandan footballer

Alpha Thierry Ssali
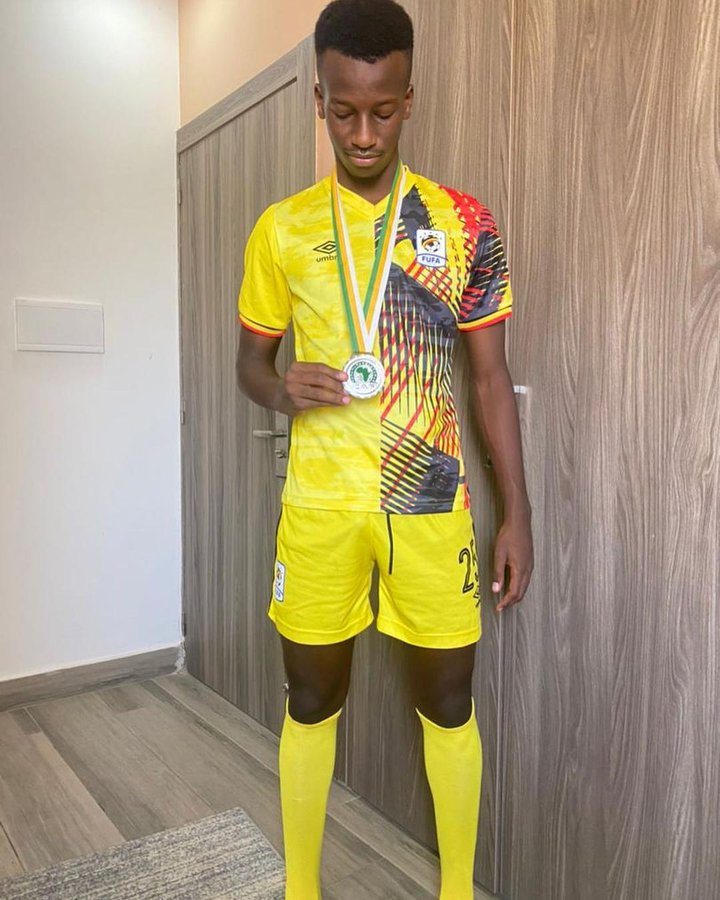

Personal information
- Full name: Alpha Thierry Ssali
- Date of birth: December 29, 2003 (age 22)
- Place of birth: Kampala, Uganda
- Height: 1.83 m (6 ft 0 in)
- Positions: Winger; forward

Team information
- Current team: KCCA FC

Youth career
- 2021: Proline Football Academy

Senior career*
Years	Team	Apps	(Gls)
2021–2023	Proline FC		
2023–2025	Express FC	35	(3)
2025	NEC FC		
2025 - Present	KCCA FC		

International career
2020–2022	Uganda Cranes U20		
2022–2023	Uganda Cranes U23		
2023–Present	Uganda Cranes		
- * Club domestic league appearances and goals

Alpha Thierry Ssali (born 29 December 2003) is a Ugandan footballer who plays as a forward for KCCA FC in the Uganda Premier League. He has represented the Uganda national football team at youth international levels.

== Early life ==
Alpha Thierry Ssali was born on 29 December 2003 in Kampala, Uganda. He is the son of Ugandan artist Moses Ssali (known professionally as Bebe Cool) and Zuena Kirema. He was named in homage to French striker Thierry Henry.

Ssali developed his football skills at the Proline Soccer Academy, where he captained the under-17 side.

== Club career ==
=== Proline FC ===
Ssali made his senior debut for Proline FC during the Stanbic Uganda Cup on 6 April 2021 and scored in a 4–1 victory over MYDA FC.

=== Express FC ===
In August 2023, he signed a two-year contract with Express FC, making 35 appearances and scoring three goals during his spell.

In December 2023, Express confirmed that Ssali missed a league fixture due to malaria.

=== NEC FC ===
In January 2025, Ssali joined NEC FC on a two-year deal. Head coach Hussein Mbalangu stated that Ssali was still adapting to the team’s style of play prior to his debut.

=== Trials in Spain ===
In early 2025, Ssali underwent trials with Khaled Catalunya Management in Spain, though his father clarified that he had not signed with a Spanish club and would return to Uganda to finish the season. Later reports linked him to a possible move to Racing Ferrol in Spain’s Segunda División.

=== KCCA FA ===
On 6 September 2025, the Kampala Capital City Authority FC announced the signing Alpha Ssali on a two year contract until 2027.

== International career ==
Ssali made his debut for the Uganda U20 in 2020 at the CECAFA U-20 Championship, in a match against Burundi. He has also represented Uganda at under-23 level and has been considered for the senior Uganda Cranes.

== Style of play ==
Ssali is primarily deployed as a winger, though he can also play as a second striker. Coaches have described him as a pacey and versatile forward with strong dribbling skills and the ability to create scoring opportunities for teammates. NEC head coach Hussein Mbalangu praised his technical ability but noted that he is still adapting to the physical demands of top-flight football.

== Career statistics ==
=== Club ===
Club appearances and goals
Club	Season(s)	League	Apps	Goals
Proline FC	2021–2023	Uganda First Division		
Express FC	2023–2025	Uganda Premier League	35	3
NEC FC	2025–Present	Uganda Premier League		

=== International ===
International appearances and goals
National team	Years	Apps	Goals
Uganda U20	2020–	–	–
Uganda U23	2022–	–	–
Uganda	2023–	–	–

== Honours ==
Uganda U20

- CECAFA U-20 Championship: 2020

== Personal life ==
Ssali is the second-born son of Ugandan musician Bebe Cool and Zuena Kirema. He has occasionally performed alongside his father at concerts.

== See also ==
- Reagan Mpande
- Allan Okello
- Rogers Ochaki Torach
