= Adaobi Okah =

Nigerian footballer

Adaobi Okah is a Nigerian footballer who plays as a forward for Rivers Angels in the Nigeria Women Football League (NWFL) and is a key member of the Nigerian women's national under-20 team, the Falconets. Known for her goal-scoring prowess and contributions to women's football, she gained recognition for her outstanding performance at the 2023 African Games held in Accra, Ghana, where she played a pivotal role in leading Nigeria to the finals of the women's football tournament.

== Early life and background ==
Adaobi Okah was born and raised in Nigeria, where she developed a passion for football from a young age. As a child, Okah drew inspiration from prominent Nigerian female footballers like Asisat Oshoala. She participated in local school competitions before joining a youth academy, where she polished her skills as a forward.

== Football career ==
Okah's career took off when she joined Rivers Angels, one of the top clubs in Nigeria's Women Football League. She became a key player for the club, known for her clinical finishing and creative play on the field. During the 2023 NWFL season, she helped Rivers Angels secure a third-place finish in the NWFL Super 6, scoring a crucial goal in their 2-0 victory over Confluence Queens. Her performance throughout the season garnered praise for her ability to deliver in high-pressure situations.

In addition to her club success, Okah has represented Nigeria at the international level, playing for the under-20 national team, the Falconets. Her versatility and strong goal-scoring record have made her a regular selection for the national side.

=== 2023 African Games ===
One of the highlights of Okah's international career came during the 2023 African Games held in Accra, Ghana. Playing as a forward for the Falconets, she was instrumental in Nigeria's march to the final. In the semi-final match against Uganda, Okah scored the opening goal in the 74th minute, propelling Nigeria to a 2-0 victory. Her composed finish underlined her ability to rise to the occasion in key moments. Alongside teammate Chiamaka Okwuchukwu, who netted the second goal, Okah's contributions were crucial in securing the team's place in the final, where they faced Ghana.
