= Opeyemi Ajakaye =

Nigerian footballer (born 2005)

Personal information
- Full name: Opeyemi Esther Ajakaye
- Date of birth: 30 December 2005 (age 20)
- Height: 1.67 m (5 ft 6 in)
- Position: Striker

Team information
- Current team: FC Robo

Senior career*
Years	Team	Apps	(Gls)
–2024	FC Robo		
2024	Madrid CFF	0	(0)
2024	Kansas City Current	0	(0)
2024	→ Carolina Ascent (loan)	2	(0)
2025–	FC Robo		

International career^{‡}
2022	Nigeria U-17	6	(1)
2024–	Nigeria U-20	2	(0)
2023–	Nigeria	1	(0)
- * Club domestic league appearances and goals as of 24 November 2024 ‡ National team caps and goals as of 12 September 2024

Opeyemi Esther Ajakaye (born 30 December 2005) is a Nigerian professional footballer who plays as a striker for NWFL Premiership club FC Robo and the Nigeria national team. She won bronze with the Flamingoes at the 2022 FIFA U-17 Women's World Cup.

== Club career ==
Ajakaye transferred from Nigerian club FC Robo to Spanish Liga F club Madrid CFF in February 2024. In October, it was reported that she left the Spanish club to play for an undisclosed club in the United States.

Ajakaye was acquired by National Women's Soccer League club Kansas City Current and sent on loan to USL Super League club Carolina Ascent FC in November 2024, making two appearances in the last games of the year. She mutually agreed to end her contract with Kansas City in January 2025.

Ajakaye returned to FC Robo in January 2025.

== International career ==
Ajakaye helped Nigeria win the bronze medal at the 2022 FIFA U-17 Women's World Cup. On 30 October 2022, she scored the first goal for Nigeria in the third place match against Germany, which ended as a 3–3 draw; she then scored the winning penalty to secure the medal.

Ajakaye made her senior debut for the Super Falcons on 25 October 2023, substituting for Asisat Oshoala in the last minutes of a 1–1 draw to Ethiopia in the 2024 CAF Women's Olympic qualifying tournament.

On 20 January 2024, Ajakaye scored the only goal against the Burundi U-20s as Nigeria won the last stage of 2024 African U-20 Women's World Cup qualification 2–0 on aggregate. She was included in the squad for the 2024 FIFA U-20 Women's World Cup, where Nigeria lost to the eventual finalists Japan in the quarterfinals.
