= Motunrayo Ezekiel =

Nigerian professional footballer

Motunrayo Ezekiel is Nigerian professional footballer who plays as a midfielder for Spanish club Valencia CF Femenino and the Nigerian women's national team. She has also represented Nigeria at the U-20 level. She was also part of the Nigerian squad that competed in the 2022 FIFA U-20 Women's World Cup in Costa Rica.

== Early life and background ==
Motunrayo Ezekiel was born on 30 May 2003 in Abuja Nigeria. Her liking for football started at an early age growing as a vasatile football player as a forward and a defender, she began her youth development football at Lakeside Queens Football Academy before she later moved to Naija Ratels Football Club.

== Club career ==
=== Lakeside Queens ===
Motunrayo started her football career with Lakeside Queens. She joined the club in 2017, she spent several years in the club developing as a vasatile player.

=== Rivers Angels ===
She later joined the Rivers Angels and played for them during the 2023–2024 Nigerian Women football league season

=== Naija Ratels ===
After she left Rivers Angels, Ezekiel moved to Naija Ratels, where her performances attracted interest from clubs outside Nigeria. She became popular after joining the Abuja-based club Naija Ratels FC. While playing in the Nigeria Women's Premier League (NWPL), she earned a reputation as a high-scoring player, famously predicting and scoring a hat-trick against the Pelican Stars in 2022.

=== Valencia ===
In January 2025, she joined the Spanish Liga F club Valencia CF Femenino and the club announced the signing of Ezekiel on a contract running until June 2026. The club described her as a versatile attacker capable of playing as a winger or centre-forward.she made appearances in Liga F during the 2024–25 season and scored her first league goal for Valencia in a match against Levante Badalona.

== International career ==
Ezekiel has represented Nigeria at under-20 level known as the Falconets . She won a silver medal with the team at the 2023 All Africa Games in Accra, Ghana. After playing for top Nigerian clubs such as Rivers Angels, her strong performances earned her a move abroad, where she signed for Valencia CF Femenino in Spain's Liga F.
