= Bruno Bunyaga =

Ugandan footballer (born 2004)

Personal information
- Date of birth: 27 March 2004 (age 22)
- Place of birth: Mpigi District, Uganda
- Height: 1.85 m (6 ft 1 in)
- Position: Striker

Team information
- Current team: Uganda Revenue Authority FC

Youth career
- Life Internal Academy
- Arrows soccer Academy

Senior career*
| Years | Team | Apps | (Gls) |
| 2023–Present | Uganda Revenue Authority FC | | |
| 2021–2022 | Buddu FC | | |
| 2020 | Buvuma FC | | |
- * Club domestic league appearances and goals as of 30 June 2024

Bruno Bunyaga (born 27 March 2004) is a Ugandan footballer who plays as a striker for Uganda Revenue Authority FC, also known as the Tax Collectors, in the Uganda Premier League.

== Early life and educational background ==
Bunyaga was born in Mawokota, Mpigi District to Moses Kawadwa and Sarah Babirye. He started his education journey at Busega Primary School (P1-P7). He joined Mackaay Memorial College, Nateete (S1-S5) and completed his A-Level at Rines SS, Namuseera. Bunyaga joined St Lawrence University for his a Bachelors degree in Business Administration.

== Club career ==
Bruno Bunyaga started his football career at Life Internal Academy– Nateete, Arrows soccer Academy – Lungujja and Devine sports Academy being inspired by Yasin Muyimba (Former Police FC player). He then played in the fourth and third divisions at Sparta 09, field of Dreams, Impala hill and Bushenyi Veterans. In 2023, he joined URA Football Club from Bushenyi Veterans. In the Buganda Masaza Cup, he started with Buvuma in 2020 and played for Buddu in 2021 and 2022 and nd was also a player for St. Lawrence University.

== Achievements and awards ==
Masaza Cup winner (2021).

Top Scorer (12 goals) in the University Football League (UFL) 2022.

Best Player of the Month for September 2022 in the Fortebet Real Star Monthly Awards.

Top scorer Masaza cup 2022(6 goals).
