= Apollo Kagogwe =

Ugandan footballer

Personal information
- Full name: Apollo Kagogwe
- Date of birth: February 18, 2003 (age 23)
- Place of birth: Uganda
- Position: Midfielder

Team information
- Current team: Maroons FC

Senior career*
Years	Team	Apps	(Gls)
2021–2022	Tooro United		
2022–2024	Wakiso Giants FC		
2024–	Maroons FC		

International career^{‡}
2023	Uganda U20		
2024	Uganda (All-Africa Games)		
- * Club domestic league appearances and goals as of date=July 2025 ‡ National team caps and goals as of date=July 2025

Apollo Kagogwe (born 18 February 2003) is a Ugandan footballer who plays as a midfielder for Maroon football club and the Uganda National Football Team. He played as a defender for Wakiso Giants FC where he participated in the star times Uganda premium league and was awarded man of the match award.

== Early life ==
Kagogwe began to develop his football career at a young age as a member of Uganda U- 20 national team also known as Uganda Hippos team. He played as right back and central defender.

== Club career ==
Kagogwe started his senior career with Tooro united during the 2021–22 season. In August 2022, he transferred to Wakiso Giants FC where he played for two seasons (2022/2023 and 2023/2024) in the defender position. His performance earned him many "man of the match accolades." On 5 July 2024, Apollo signed a contract with Maroon FC where he transitioned into the midfielder role.

== International career ==
Kagogwe represented Uganda at 2023 U-20 Africa cup of nations that took place in Egypt. He was selected in the Uganda national team to play at the all Africa games 2024 hosted in Ghana.

== See also ==
- Martin Mpuga
