= Jerry Afriyie =

Ghanaian association football player (born 2006)

Personal information
- Date of birth: 10 December 2006 (age 19)
- Height: 1.80 m (5 ft 11 in)
- Position: Striker

Team information
- Current team: Genk
- Number: 33

Youth career
- Thoughts FC

Senior career*
Years	Team	Apps	(Gls)
–2025	Thoughts FC		
2025–2026	Al-Qadsiah	0	(0)
2025	→ Lugo (loan)	10	(4)
2025–2026	→ La Louvière (loan)	31	(5)
2026–	Genk	4	(0)

International career^{‡}
2023–	Ghana U20	5	(0)
2024–	Ghana	4	(1)
- * Club domestic league appearances and goals as of 10 October 2026 ‡ National team caps and goals as of 23 May 2026

Jerry Afriyie (born 10 December 2006) is a Ghanaian professional footballer who plays as a striker for Belgian club Genk and the Ghana national team.

== Club career ==
From the Tano North Municipal District, he started playing domestic football in Ghana for Thoughts FC.

On 23 January 2025, Afriyie joined Saudi Pro League club Al-Qadsiah on a three-year deal. On 25 January 2025, Afriyie was loaned out to Primera Federación club CD Lugo. On 23 August 2025, Afriyie joined Belgian Pro League side La Louvière on a one-year loan.

On 18 August 2026, Afriyie signed a five-year contract with Genk.

== International career ==
He was called up to the Ghana under-20 national team in 2023 and was selected for the final Black Satellites team for the 13th African Games, held in Ghana. He helped the team secure the gold medal in the final against Uganda.

He was named Best Player of the 2024 WAFU B U-20 Championship after Ghana U20 finished in second position behind Nigeria U20 in Togo in October 2024. He won the Golden Boot award in the competition, scoring five goals in five matches.

He made history as the first player from the Ghanaian third-tier league to be called up for the senior Ghana national football team in November 2024, for 2025 Africa Cup of Nations qualification games. He scored on his debut against Niger on 16 November 2024.

== Career statistics ==
=== Club ===
As of match played 17 October 2026

Appearances and goals by club, season and competition
Club	Season	League			National cup		Continental		Other		Total	
Club	Season	Division	Apps	Goals	Apps	Goals	Apps	Goals	Apps	Goals	Apps	Goals
Al-Qadsiah	2024–25	Saudi Pro League	0	0	0	0	—		—		0	0
Al-Qadsiah	2025–26	Saudi Pro League	0	0	0	0	—		—		0	0
Al-Qadsiah	Total		0	0	0	0	—		—		0	0
Lugo (loan)	2024–25	Primera Federación	10	4	—		—		—		10	4
La Louvière (loan)	2025–26	Belgian Pro League	31	5	3	0	—		—		34	5
Genk	2026–27	Belgian Pro League	4	0	1	0	—		—		5	0
Career total			45	9	4	0	0	0	0	0	49	9

=== International ===
As of match played 23 May 2026

Appearances and goals by national team and year
National team	Year	Apps	Goals
Ghana	2024	1	1
Ghana	2025	2	0
Ghana	2026	1	0
Total		4	1

Scores and results list Gabon's goal tally first, score column indicates score after each Afriyie goal.

List of international goals scored by Jerry Afriyie
No.	Date	Venue	Opponent	Score	Result	Competition
1	18 November 2024	Baba Yara Stadium, Kumasi, Ghana	Niger	1–1	1–2	2025 Africa Cup of Nations qualification
