= Esther Onyenezide =

Nigerian footballer (born 2003)

Personal information
- Full name: Esther Chinemerem Onyenezide
- Date of birth: 30 June 2003
- Height: 1.61 m (5 ft 3 in)
- Position: Midfielder

Team information
- Current team: Madrid CFF

Esther Chinemerem Onyenezide (born 30 June 2003) is a Nigerian professional footballer who plays as a midfielder for the Spanish women's club Madrid CFF and the Nigeria women's national team.

In 2022, she was selected by FIFA as the Player of the Match scoring twice during the 3–1 win against Canada.

== Career ==
Onyenezide represented Nigeria in the 2022 FIFA U-20 World Cup in Costa Rica, and played for FC Robo Queens before moving to Madrid CFF with a three-season deal in 2024.
