= Déborah Ngalula =

DR Congolese footballer (born 2002)

Personal information
- Full name: Déborah Stone Kolonga Ngalula
- Date of birth: 25 May 2002 (age 24)
- Place of birth: Kinshasa, DR Congo
- Positions: Midfielder; winger

Team information
- Current team: La Roche
- Number: 9

Senior career*
Years	Team	Apps	(Gls)
20??–2021	CSF Bikira		
2021–2022	1207 Antalya Spor		
2022–2023	Žalgiris		
2023	Yzeure	8	(1)
2023–	La Roche		

International career
- DR Congo U20
- DR Congo
- * Club domestic league appearances and goals as of 28 May 2023

Déborah Stone Kolonga Ngalula (born 25 May 2002) is a DR Congolese footballer who plays as a midfielder or winger for French Régional 1 Féminine club La Roche and the DR Congo women's national team.

== Early life ==
Ngalula grew up idolizing DR Congo international Trésor Mputu.

== Club career ==
Ngalula played for DR Congolese side CSF Bikira, where she was regarded as one of the club's most important players. In 2023, she signed for French side FF Yzeure Allier Auvergne, becoming the first Congolese female player to play in France.

== International career ==
Ngalula has captained the DR Congo women's national under-20 football team.

== Style of play ==
Ngalula can operates as an offensive midfielder or as a left-winger or right-winger.

== Personal life ==
Ngalula has been nicknamed the "Congolese Mbappé" after France international Kylian Mbappé.
