= Ethiopia women's national under-20 football team =

Ethiopia women's U-20
- Nickname: Lucy
- Association: Ethiopian Football Federation
- Confederation: CAF (Africa)
- Sub-confederation: CECAFA (East & Central Africa)
- Head coach: Firew Hailegebriel
First colours	Second colours

African U-20 World Cup qualification
- Appearances: 4 (first in 2015)
- Best result: Semi-finals (2022)

The Ethiopia women's national under-20 football team represents Ethiopia in international youth women's football competitions.

The team won the first edition of the CECAFA Women's U-20 Championship.

== Results and fixtures ==
The following is a list of match results in the last 12 months, as well as any future matches that have been scheduled.

Legend

Win Draw Loss Fixture

== Competitive record ==
=== FIFA U-20 Women's World Cup record ===
FIFA U-20 Women's World Cup
Year	Result	Matches	Wins	Draws*	Losses	GF	GA
(Canada) 2002	Did not qualify						
(Thailand) 2004	Did not qualify						
(Russia) 2006	Did not qualify						
(Chile) 2008	Did not qualify						
(Germany) 2010	Did not qualify						
(Japan) 2012	Did not qualify						
(Canada) 2014	Did not qualify						
(Papua New Guinea) 2016	Did not qualify						
(France) 2018	Did not qualify						
(Costa Rica) 2022	Did not qualify						
(Colombia) 2024	Did not qualify						
(Poland) 2026	Did not qualify						
Total	1/12	0	0	0	0	0	0

=== African U-20 Women's World Cup Qualification record ===
African U-20 Women's World Cup qualification
Appearances: 4
Year	Round	Position	Pld	W	D	L	GF	GA
2002	Did not enter							
2004	Did not enter							
2006	Did not enter							
2008	Did not enter							
2010	Did not enter							
2012	Did not enter							
2014	Did not enter							
2015	Round 3	8th	6	2	3	1	6	7
2018	Round 1	16th	2	0	1	1	3	4
2022	Round 5	4th	8	5	0	3	19	8
2024	Round 4	8th	6	4	1	1	12	4
Total	4/11	0 Title	22	11	5	6	40	23

== See also ==
- Ethiopia women's national football team
- Ethiopia women's national under-17 football team
