= Chioma Olise =

Nigerian Football player

Personal information
- Full name: Chioma Olise
- Date of birth: March 16, 2005 (age 21)
- Place of birth: Nigeria
- Height: 1.69 m (5 ft 7 in)
- Position: Midfielder

Team information
- Current team: Trabzonspor
- Number: 16

Senior career*
Years	Team	Apps	(Gls)
- Edo Queens
2025–	Trabzonspor		

International career
- Nigeria U20
- * Club domestic league appearances and goals

Chioma Olise (born 16 March 2005) is a Nigerian football player that played as a midfielder for the Nigeria Women Football League champions Edo Queens she later transferred to the Turkish Women’s Football Super League side, Trabzonspor, where she now plays as a forward.

== Club career ==
Chioma began her football career with the Royal Queens when the team got promoted to the NWFL Premiership. She later joined the Edo Queens where she became a key midfielder. During her time in the club she helped them win the 2023–24 NWFL Premiership title and she also contributed to their success in other competitions. Her performance helped her gain recognition both at the international and continental level, including the 2024 CAF Women's Champions league, where Edo Queens finished in fourth place.

In February 2025, Olise moved abroad to join Turkish club Trabzonspor in the Turkish Women’s Super League on a long-term contract. She wears the number 16 jersey and plays primarily as a defensive midfielder. The Trabzonspor regularly compete in the Turkcell Women's Football Super League, which is the top tier of women's football in Turkey.

== International career ==
Olise has played for Nigeria at youth level, she played for the Nigeria U20 national team (Falconets). She was part of the squad for youth international competitions, including the FIFA U-20 Women’s World Cup campaigns, and has recorded appearances and goals at Under 20 level.

== Style of play ==
Chioma played as a forward for the Edo Queens, she also plays as a midfielder, is well known as a midfielder because of her strong defense awareness and ball distribution. She is often deployed as a defensive midfielder, where she helps in breaking up opposition attacks and supporting build-up play from deep positions.
