= 2016 Women's Africa Cup of Nations =

12th edition of WAFCON

Coupe d'Afrique des nations féminine de football 2016

Tournament details
- Host country: Cameroon
- Dates: 19 November – 3 December
- Teams: 8
- Venues: 2 (in 2 host cities)

Final positions
- Champions: Nigeria (10th title)
- Runners-up: Cameroon
- Third place: Ghana
- Fourth place: South Africa

Tournament statistics
- Matches played: 16
- Goals scored: 39 (2.44 per match)
- Top scorer: (Nigeria) Asisat Oshoala (6 goals)
- Best player: (Cameroon) Gabrielle Onguéné
- Fair play award: Cameroon

The 2016 Women's Africa Cup of Nations was the 12th edition of the biennial African women's association football tournament organized by the Confederation of African Football that was held in Cameroon. Originally scheduled to be held between 8 and 22 October 2016, it was delayed to between 19 November and 3 December 2016 due to weather considerations.

On 6 August 2015, the CAF Executive Committee announced a tournament name change from the African Women's Championship to the African Women Cup of Nations, similar to the male Africa Cup of Nations. However, CAF alternated this tournament's official logo between the original name and the new name, the Women/Women's Africa Cup of Nations or Women/Women's AFCON.

== Qualification ==
Hosts Cameroon qualified automatically, while the remaining seven spots were determined by the qualification rounds which took place in March and April 2016.

=== Qualified teams ===
The following eight teams qualified for the group stage. Mali protested to CAF about Equatorial Guinea fielding an ineligible player in their qualifier; CAF thus disqualified the latter and had the former replace them at the group stage.

Team	Appearance	Previous best appearance	FIFA ranking at start of event
Cameroon (hosts)	11th	Runners-up (1991, 2004, 2014)	47
Egypt	2nd	Group stage (1998)	80
Ghana	11th	Runners-up (1998, 2002, 2006)	46
Kenya	1st	Debut	132
Mali	6th	Group stage (2002, 2004, 2006, 2008, 2010)	92
Nigeria	12th	Champions (1991, 1995, 1998, 2000, 2002, 2004, 2006, 2010, 2014)	37
South Africa	11th	Runners-up (1995, 2000, 2008, 2012)	48
Zimbabwe	4th	Fourth place (2000)	94

== Venues ==
This edition of the tournament took place in Yaoundé and Limbe.

Yaoundé	2016 Women's Africa Cup of Nations is located in Cameroon	Limbe
Stade Ahmadou Ahidjo	2016 Women's Africa Cup of Nations is located in Cameroon	Limbe Omnisports Stadium
Capacity: 42,500	2016 Women's Africa Cup of Nations is located in Cameroon	Capacity: 20,000

== Squads ==
Each participating team's squad contained a maximum of 21 players.

== Draw ==
The draw for the group stage took place at the Palais Polyvalent des Sports in Yaoundé on 18 September 2016 at 16:00 WAT (UTC+1). The eight teams were drawn into two groups of four. For the draw, hosts Cameroon were seeded in position A1 and the defending champions Nigeria were seeded in position B1, with the remaining six teams seeded based on their results in the preceding three tournament editions.

Pot 1	Pot 2	Pot 3
Cameroon (position A1); Nigeria (position B1)	Ghana; South Africa	Egypt; Kenya; Mali; Zimbabwe

== Group stage ==
The fixtures were released on 3 November 2015. The top two teams of each group advance to the semi-finals.

Tiebreakers

The teams are ranked according to the three points for a win system; 3 for a win, 1 for a draw and none for a loss. If tied on points, the following tiebreakers are applied in the following order:

1. Number of points obtained in games between the teams concerned;
2. Goal difference in games between the teams concerned;
3. Goals scored in games between the teams concerned;
4. If, after applying criteria 1 to 3 to several teams, two teams still have an equal ranking, criteria 1 to 3 are reapplied exclusively to the matches between the two teams in question to determine their final rankings. If this procedure does not lead to a decision, criteria 5 to 7 apply;
5. Goal difference in all games;
6. Goals scored in all games;
7. Drawing of lots.

All times are local, WAT (UTC+1).

=== Group A ===
Pos	Team	Pld	W	D	L	GF	GA	GD	Pts	Qualification
1	Cameroon (H)	3	3	0	0	5	0	+5	9	Knockout stage
2	South Africa	3	1	1	1	5	1	+4	4	Knockout stage
3	Egypt	3	1	0	2	1	7	−6	3	
4	Zimbabwe	3	0	1	2	0	3	−3	1	

Source: CAF (archived)
Rules for classification: Group stage tiebreakers
(H) Hosts
19 November 2016
15:30

Cameroon	2–0	Egypt
Onguéné 25'; Manie 72' (pen.)	Report

Stade Ahmadou Ahidjo, Yaoundé
Referee: Lidya Tafesse (Ethiopia)
19 November 2016
18:30

South Africa	0–0	Zimbabwe
	Report

Stade Ahmadou Ahidjo, Yaoundé
Referee: Caroline Wanjala (Kenya)

22 November 2016
16:00

Cameroon	1–0	South Africa
Ngo 83'	Report

Stade Ahmadou Ahidjo, Yaoundé
Referee: Aissata Ameyo Amegee (Togo)
22 November 2016
19:00

Zimbabwe	0–1	Egypt
	Report	Tarik 83'

Stade Ahmadou Ahidjo, Yaoundé
Referee: Suavis Iratunga (Burundi)

25 November 2016
16:00

Zimbabwe	0–2	Cameroon
	Report	Akaba 2', 50'

Stade Ahmadou Ahidjo, Yaoundé
Referee: Jonesia Rukyaa Kabakama (Tanzania)
25 November 2016
16:00

Egypt	0–5	South Africa
	Report	Mgcoyi 27'; Vilakazi 60'; Jane 61'; Seoposenwe 66'; Motlhalo 84'

Stade Municipal de Limbe, Limbe
Referee: Salima Mukansanga (Rwanda)

=== Group B ===
Pos	Team	Pld	W	D	L	GF	GA	GD	Pts	Qualification
1	Nigeria	3	2	1	0	11	1	+10	7	Knockout stage
2	Ghana	3	2	1	0	7	3	+4	7	Knockout stage
3	Mali	3	1	0	2	4	10	−6	3	
4	Kenya	3	0	0	3	2	10	−8	0	

Source: CAF (archived)
Rules for classification: Group stage tiebreakers
20 November 2016
16:00

Nigeria	6–0	Mali
Ordega 21'; Oshoala 40', 63', 69', 78'; U. Sunday 48' (pen.)	Report

Stade Municipal de Limbe, Limbe
Referee: Gladys Lengwe (Zambia)
20 November 2016
19:00

Ghana	3–1	Kenya
Suleman 49'; Addo 71'; Boakye 90'	Report	Akida 23'

Stade Municipal de Limbe, Limbe
Referee: Jeanne Ekoumou (Cameroon)

23 November 2016
16:00

Nigeria	1–1	Ghana
Oshoala 19'	Report	Addo 43' (pen.)

Stade Municipal de Limbe, Limbe
Referee: Akhona Makalima (South Africa)
23 November 2016
19:00

Kenya	1–3	Mali
Salano 80'	Report	Coulibaly 36'; Touré 50', 62' (pen.)

Stade Municipal de Limbe, Limbe
Referee: Salima Mukansanga (Rwanda)

26 November 2016
19:00

Kenya	0–4	Nigeria
	Report	Okobi 3'; Ikidi 7'; Oshoala 53'; Oparanozie 89'

Stade Municipal de Limbe, Limbe
Referee: Letticia Viana (Swaziland)
26 November 2016
19:00

Mali	1–3	Ghana
Diarra 87'	Report	Eshun 44'; Suleman 68'; Addo 79' (pen.)

Stade Ahmadou Ahidjo, Yaoundé
Referee: Maria Rivet (Mauritius)

== Knockout stage ==
At this stage, if a match has its scores level at the end of 90 minutes, extra time except for the third place match and followed, if necessary, by a penalty shoot-out

=== Bracket ===
Semi-finals
29 November – Yaoundé
Cameroon	1
Ghana	0
29 November – Limbe
Nigeria	1
South Africa	0

Final
3 December – Yaoundé
Cameroon	0
Nigeria	1
Third place play-off
2 December – Yaoundé
Ghana	1
South Africa	0

=== Semi-finals ===
29 November 2016
16:00

Cameroon	1–0	Ghana
Feudjio 72'	Report

Ahmadou Ahidjo Stadium, Yaoundé
Referee: Gladys Lengwe (Zambia)

29 November 2016
19:00

Nigeria	1–0	South Africa
Oparanozie 54'	Report

Limbe Stadium, Limbe
Referee: Lidya Tafesse (Ethiopia)

=== Third place play-off ===
2 December 2016
15:30

Ghana	1–0	South Africa
Eshun 48'	Report

Ahmadou Ahidjo Stadium, Yaoundé
Referee: Jonesia Rukyaa Kabakama (Tanzania)

=== Final ===
3 December 2016
15:30

Cameroon	0–1	Nigeria
	Report	Oparanozie 86'

Ahmadou Ahidjo Stadium, Yaoundé
Referee: Aissata Ameyo Amegee (Togo)

== Goalscorers ==
6 goals

- (Nigeria) Asisat Oshoala

3 goals

- (Ghana) Elizabeth Addo
- (Nigeria) Desire Oparanozie

2 goals

- (Cameroon) Henriette Akaba
- (Ghana) Linda Eshun
- (Ghana) Samira Suleman
- (Mali) Bassira Touré

1 goal

- (Cameroon) Raissa Feudjio
- (Cameroon) Christine Manie
- (Cameroon) Genevieve Ngo
- (Cameroon) Gabrielle Onguéné
- (Egypt) Salma Tarik
- (Ghana) Portia Boakye
- (Kenya) Esse Akida
- (Kenya) Cheris Salano
- (Mali) Sebe Coulibaly
- (Mali) Binta Diarra
- (Nigeria) Faith Ikidi
- (Nigeria) Ngozi Okobi
- (Nigeria) Francisca Ordega
- (Nigeria) Uchechi Sunday
- (South Africa) Refiloe Jane
- (South Africa) Andisiwe Mgcoyi
- (South Africa) Linda Motlhalo
- (South Africa) Jermaine Seoposenwe
- (South Africa) Nothando Vilakazi

== Awards ==
The following awards were given at the conclusion of this edition of the tournament:

Award	Winner
Best player	(Cameroon) Gabrielle Onguéné
Top scorer	(Nigeria) Asisat Oshoala
Fair Play award	Cameroon

Best XI
Position	Players
Goalkeeper	(Cameroon) Annette Ngo Ndom
Defenders	(Cameroon) Claudine Meffometou; (Nigeria) Osinachi Ohale; (South Africa) Janine van Wyk; (Ghana) Linda Eshun
Midfielders	(South Africa) Jermaine Seoposenwe; (Cameroon) Raissa Feudjio; (Ghana) Elizabeth Addo; (Cameroon) Gabrielle Onguéné
Forwards	(Nigeria) Desire Oparanozie; (Nigeria) Asisat Oshoala
Substitutes	(Nigeria) Alaba Jonathan; (Cameroon) Aurelle Awona; (Ghana) Janet Egyir; (Nigeria) Francisca Ordega; (Ghana) Portia Boakye; (South Africa) Nothando Vilakazi

== Gallery ==
Demonstrations during the Opening Ceremony in Yaoundé

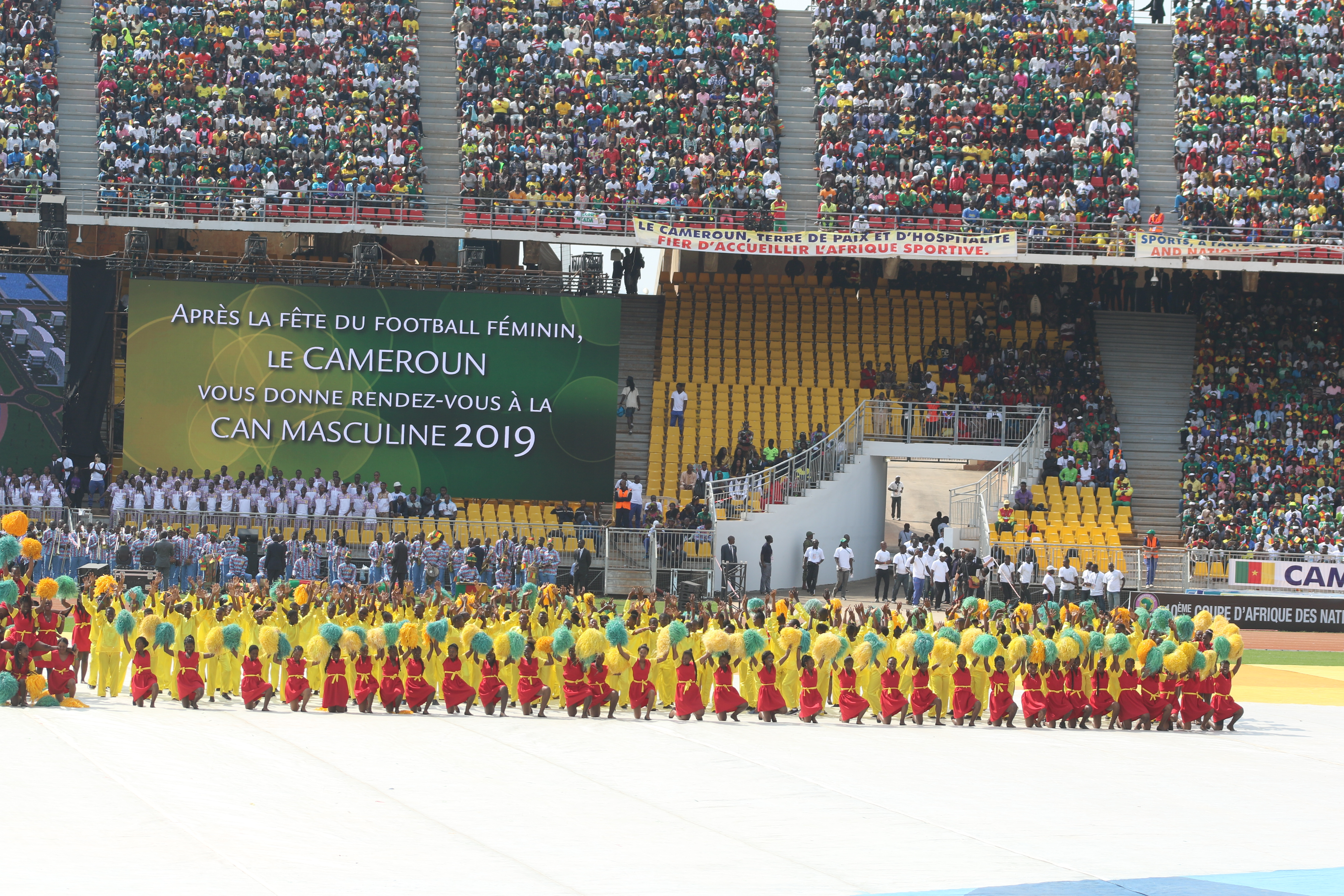

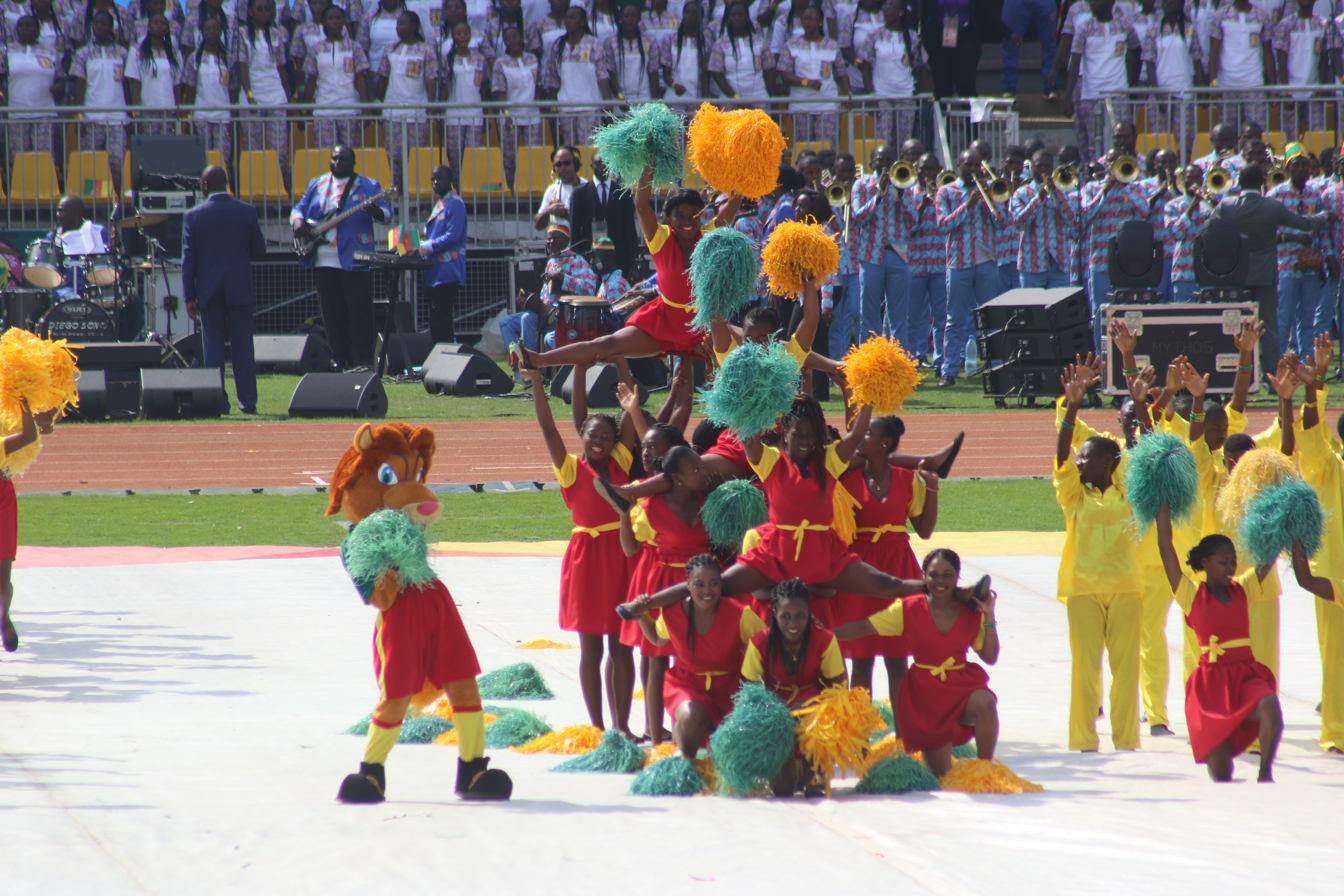

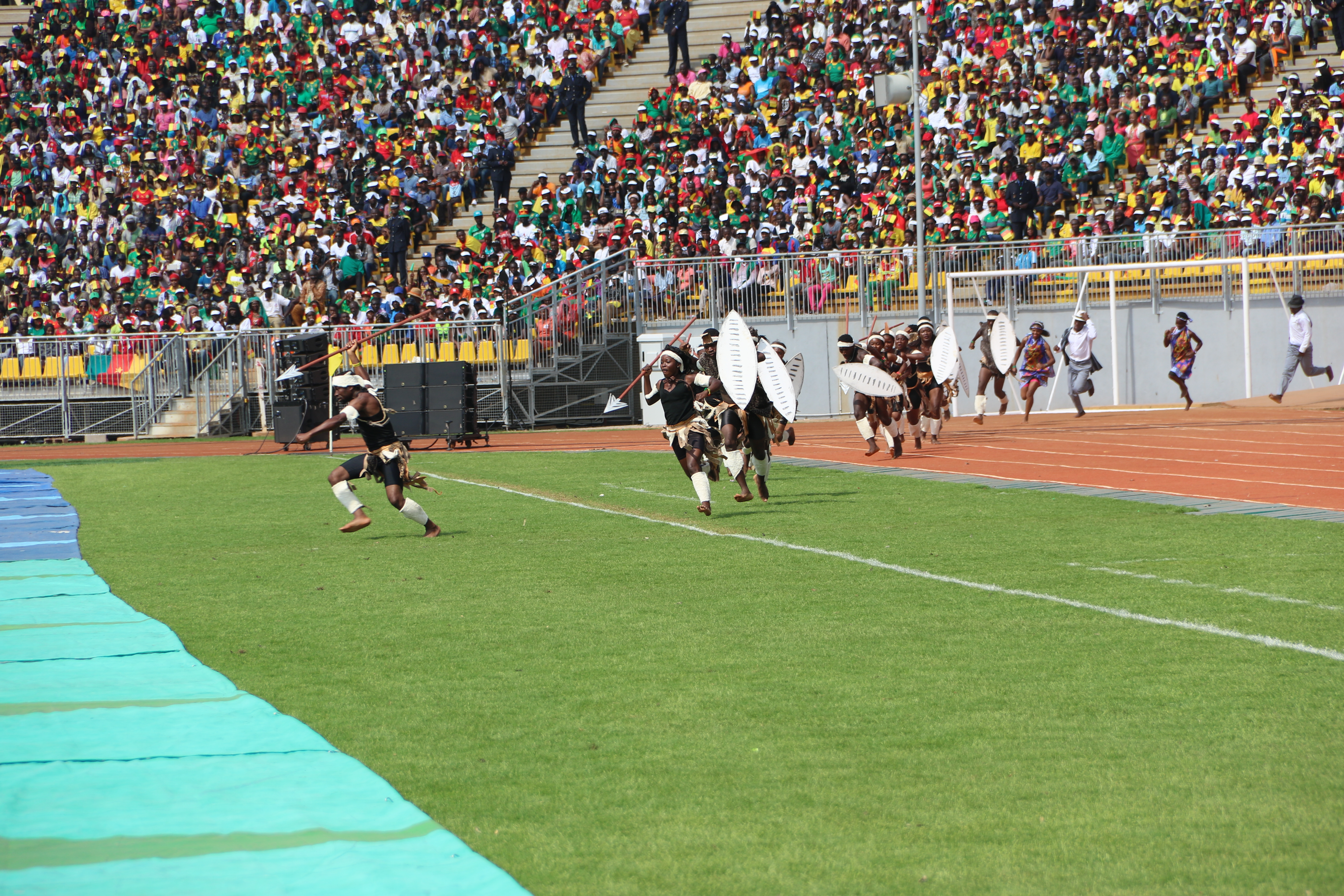

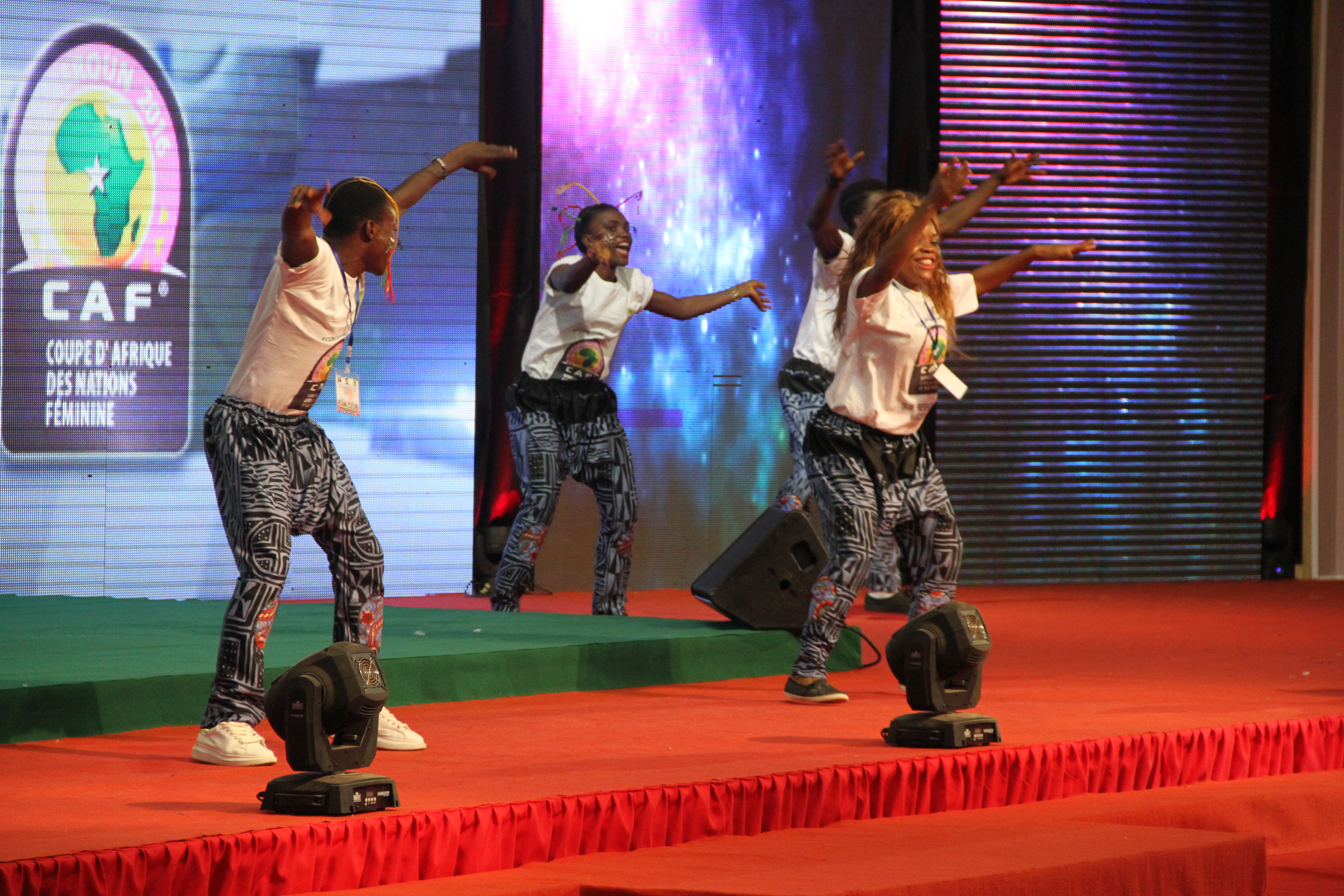

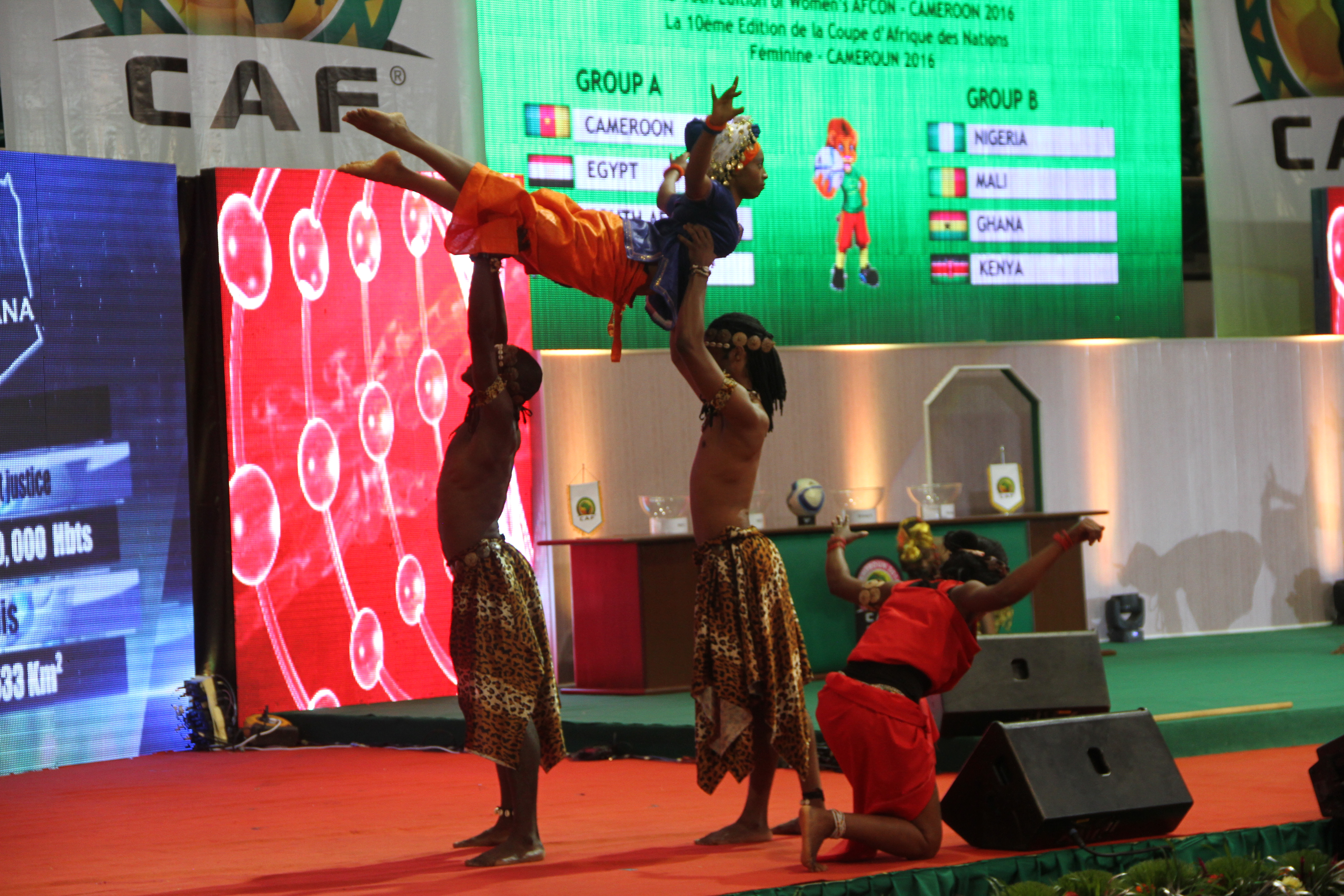

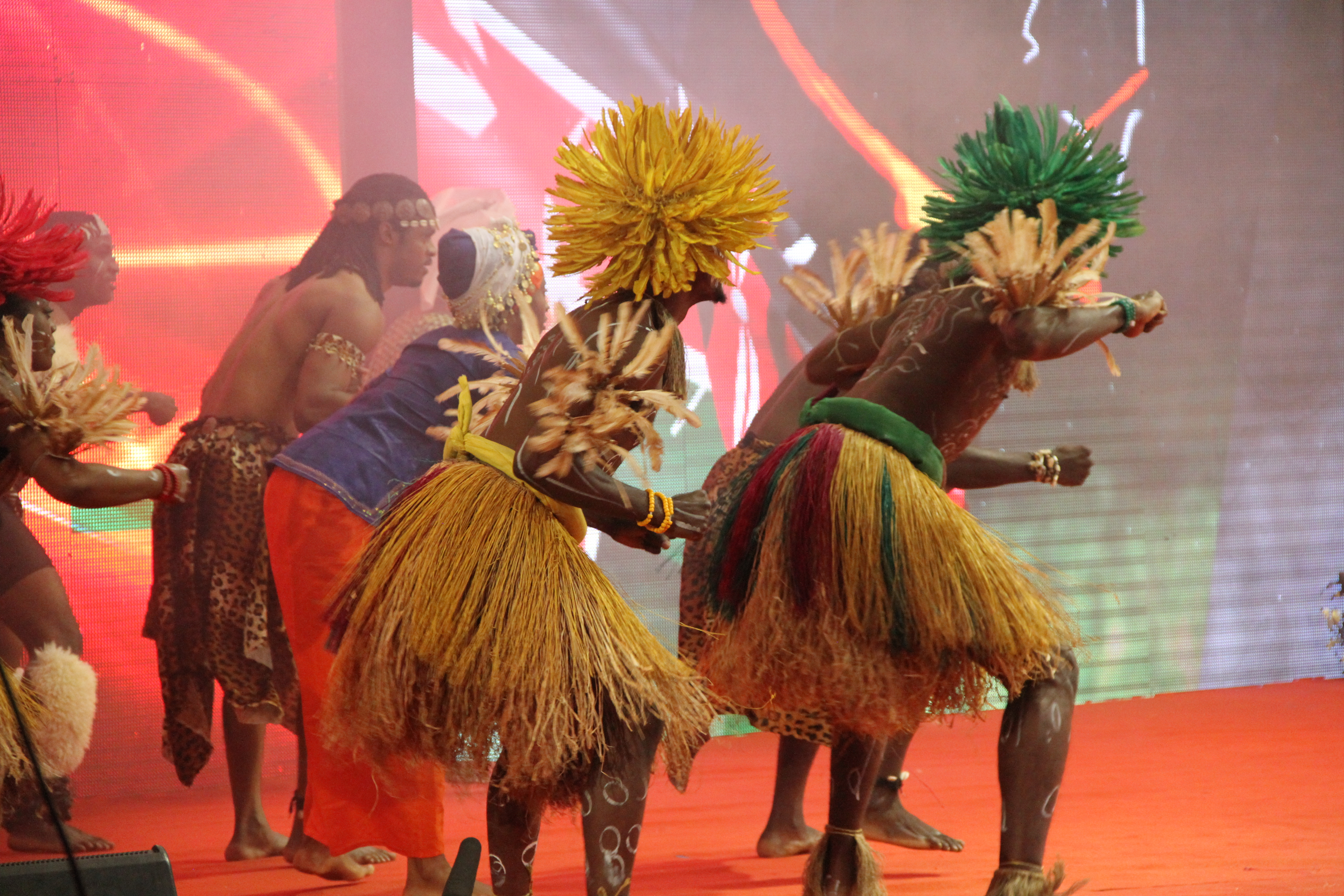

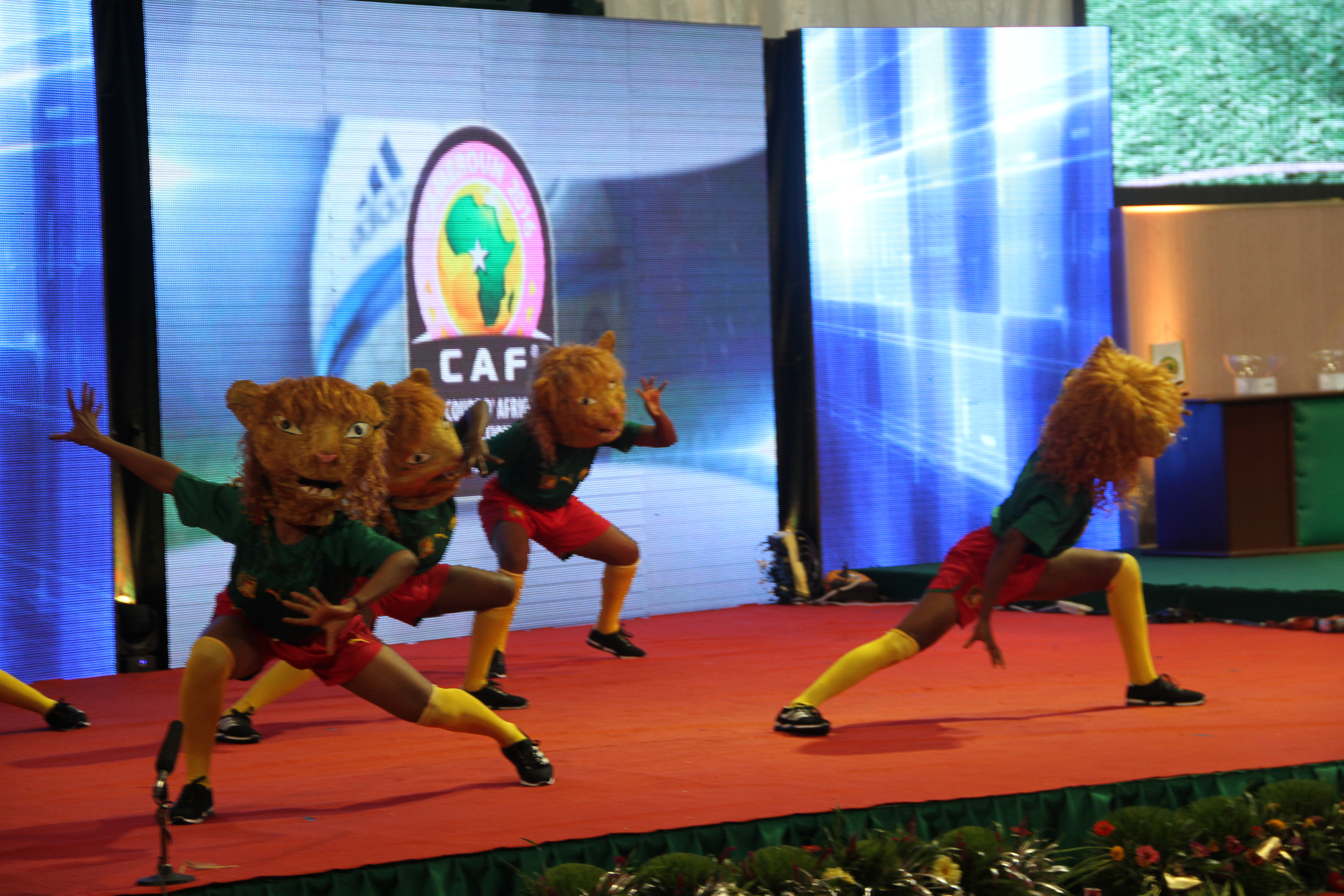

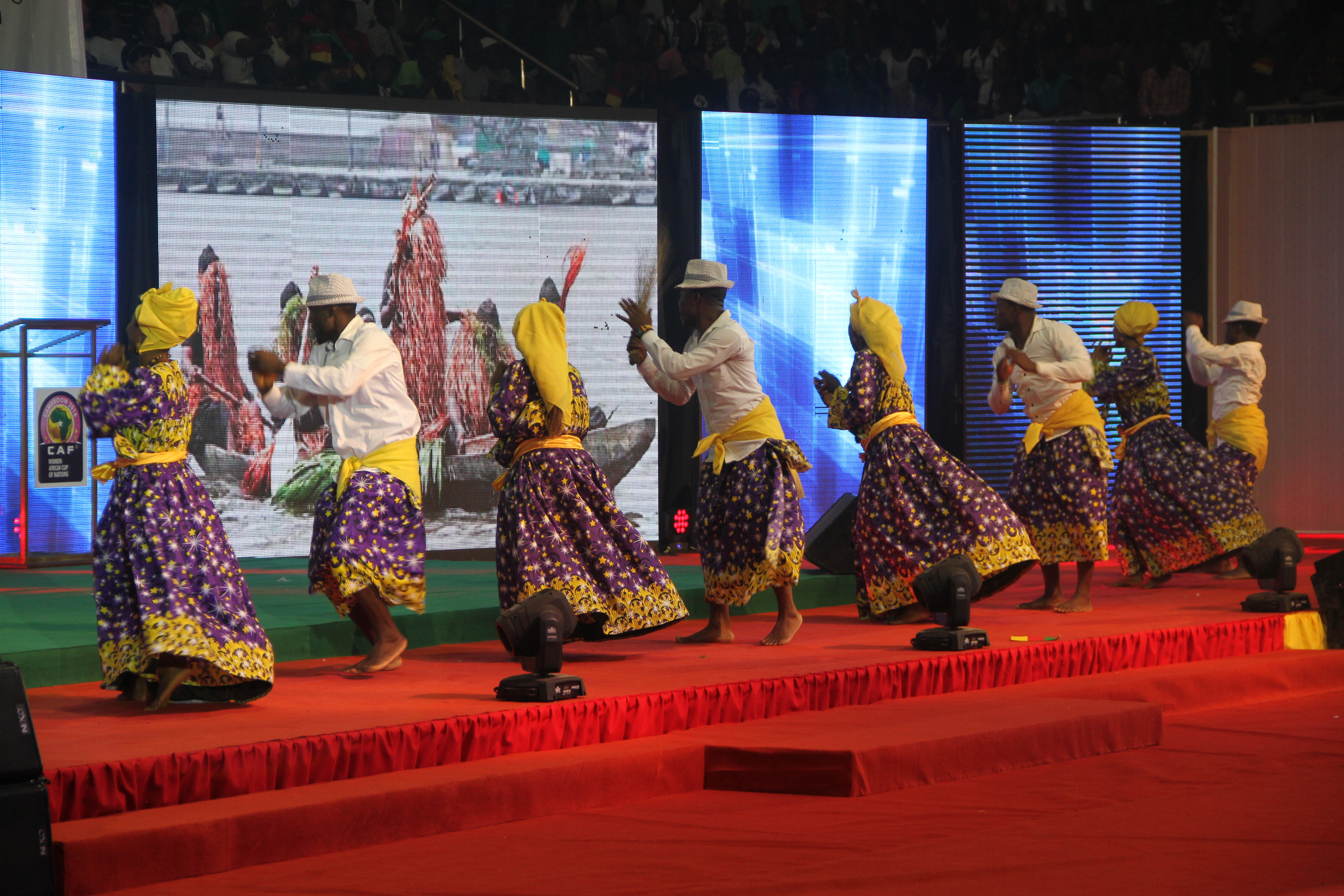

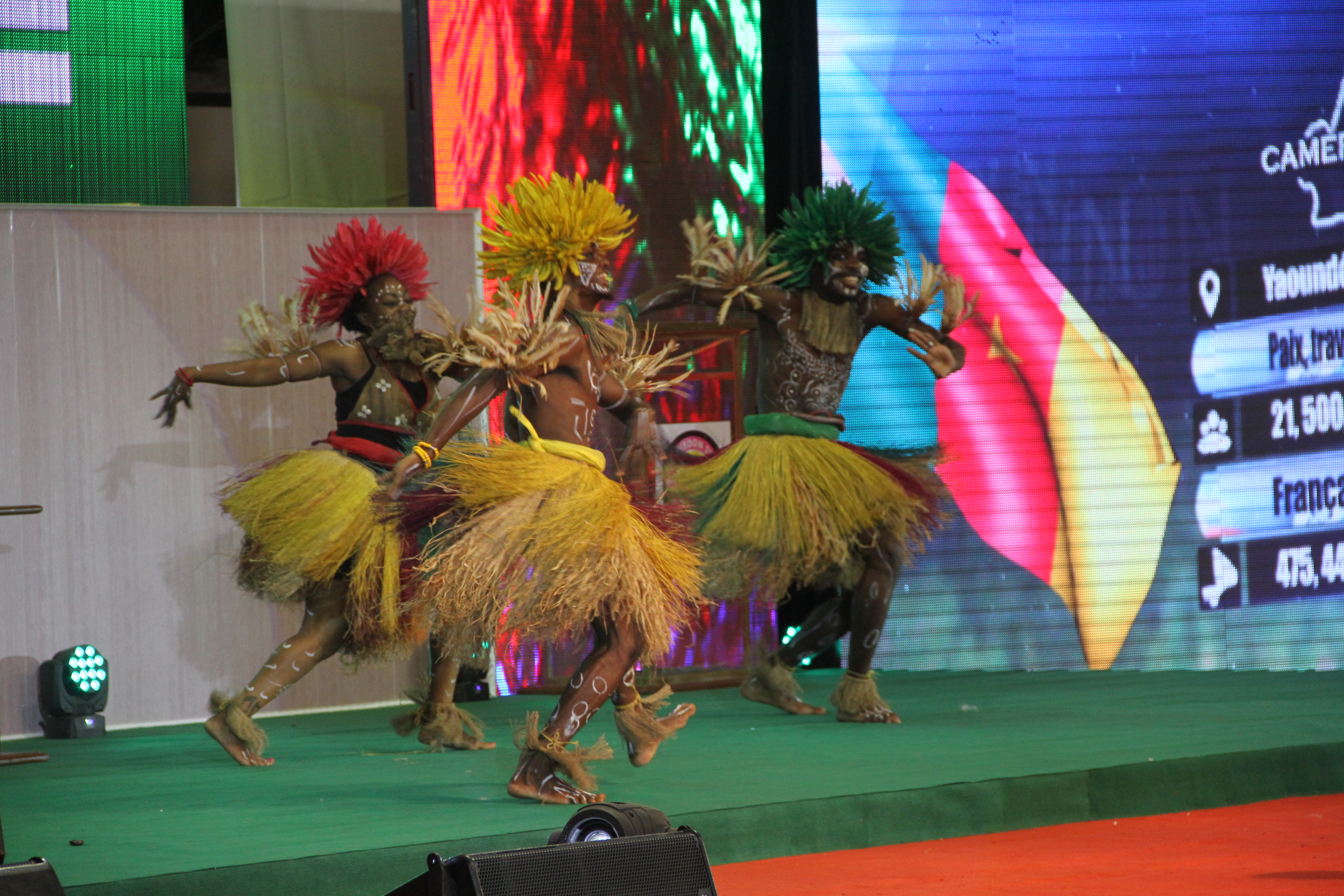

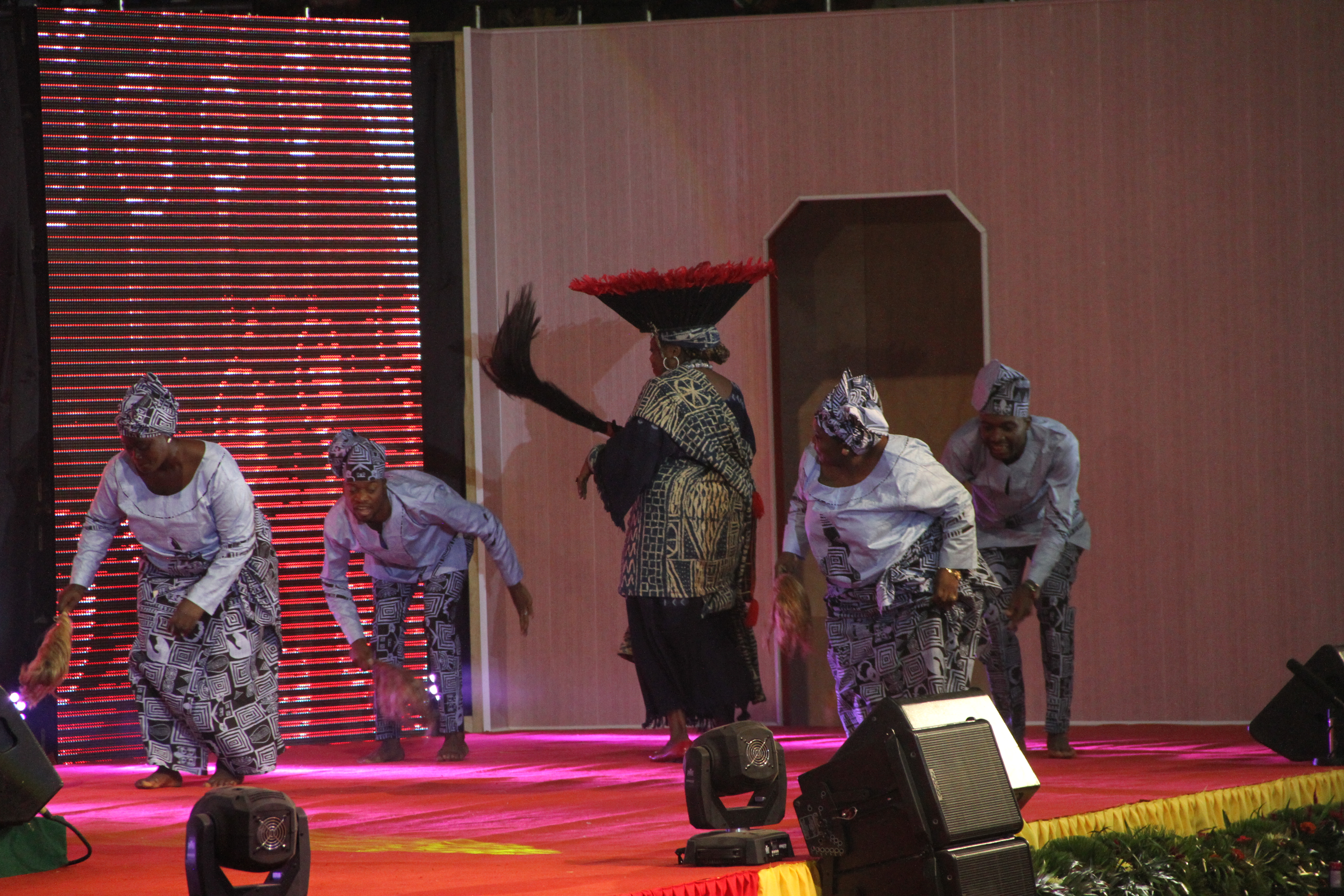

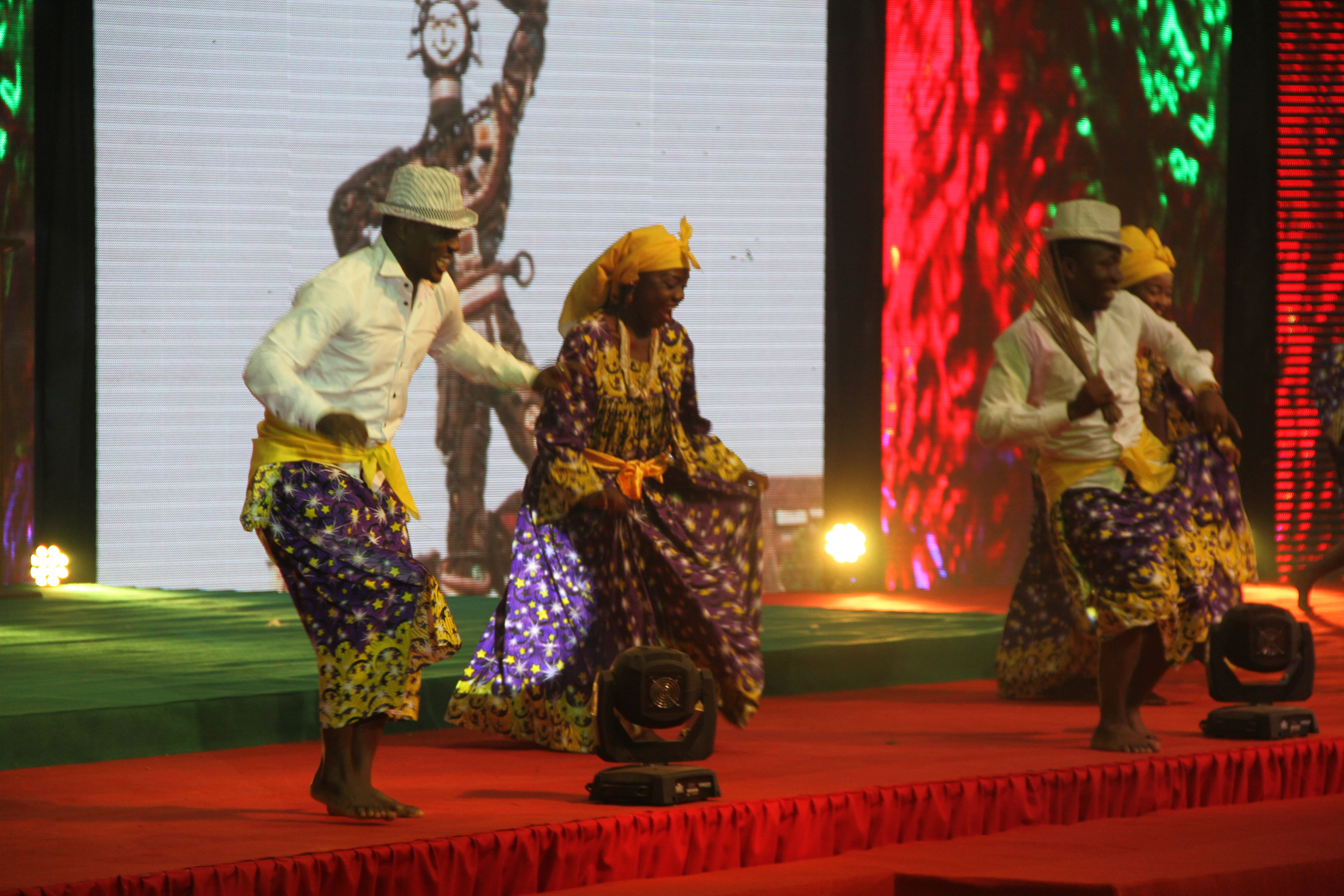

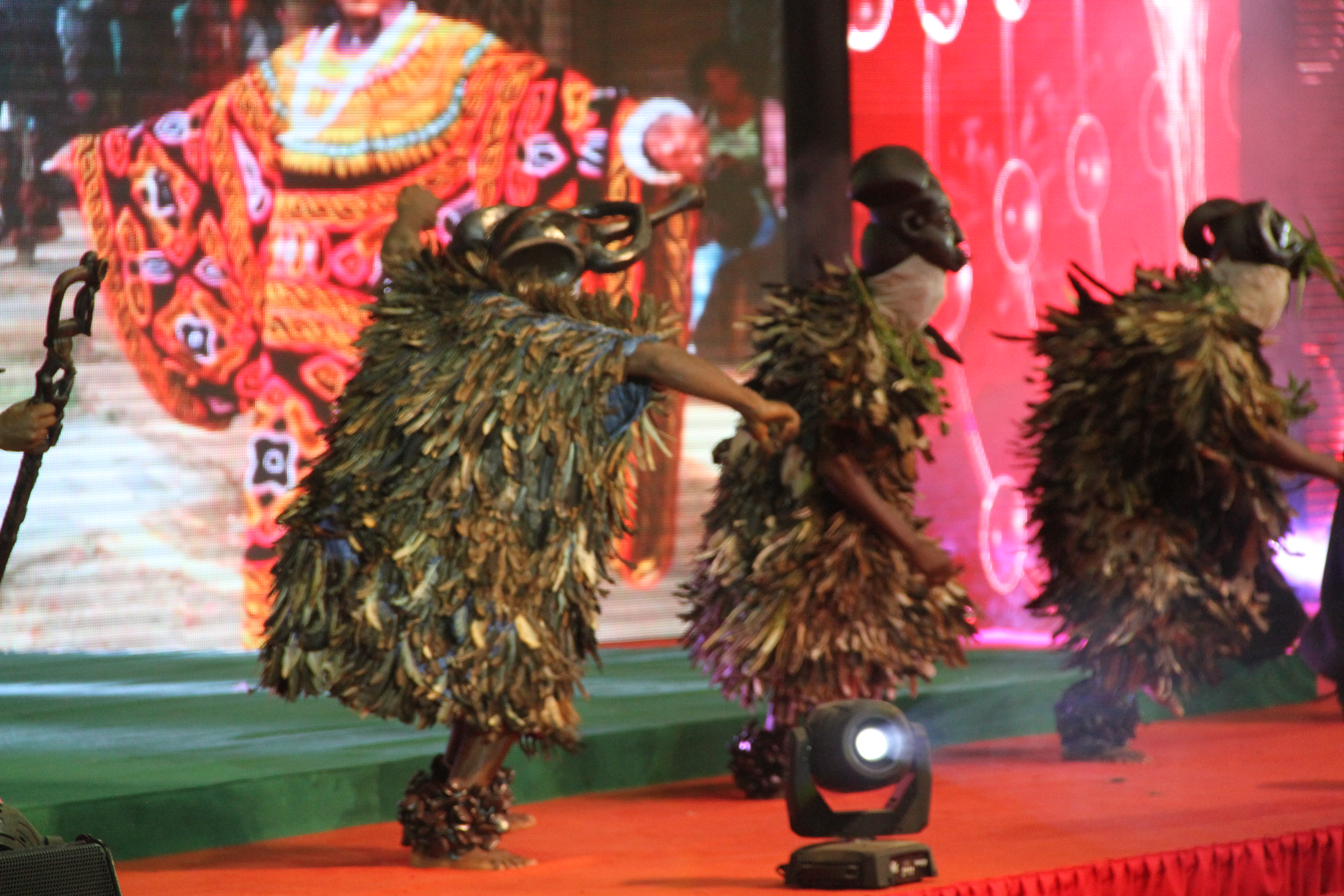

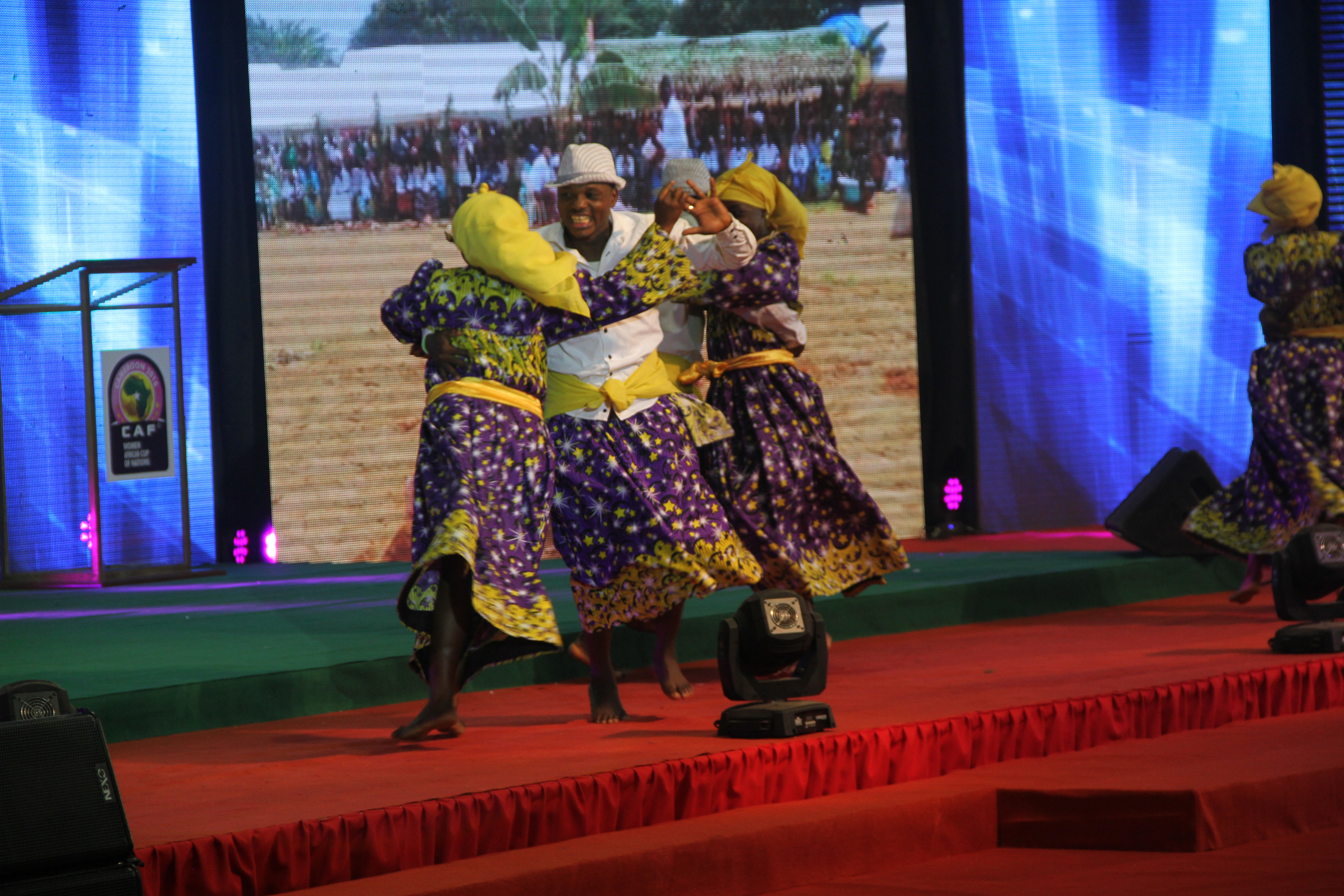

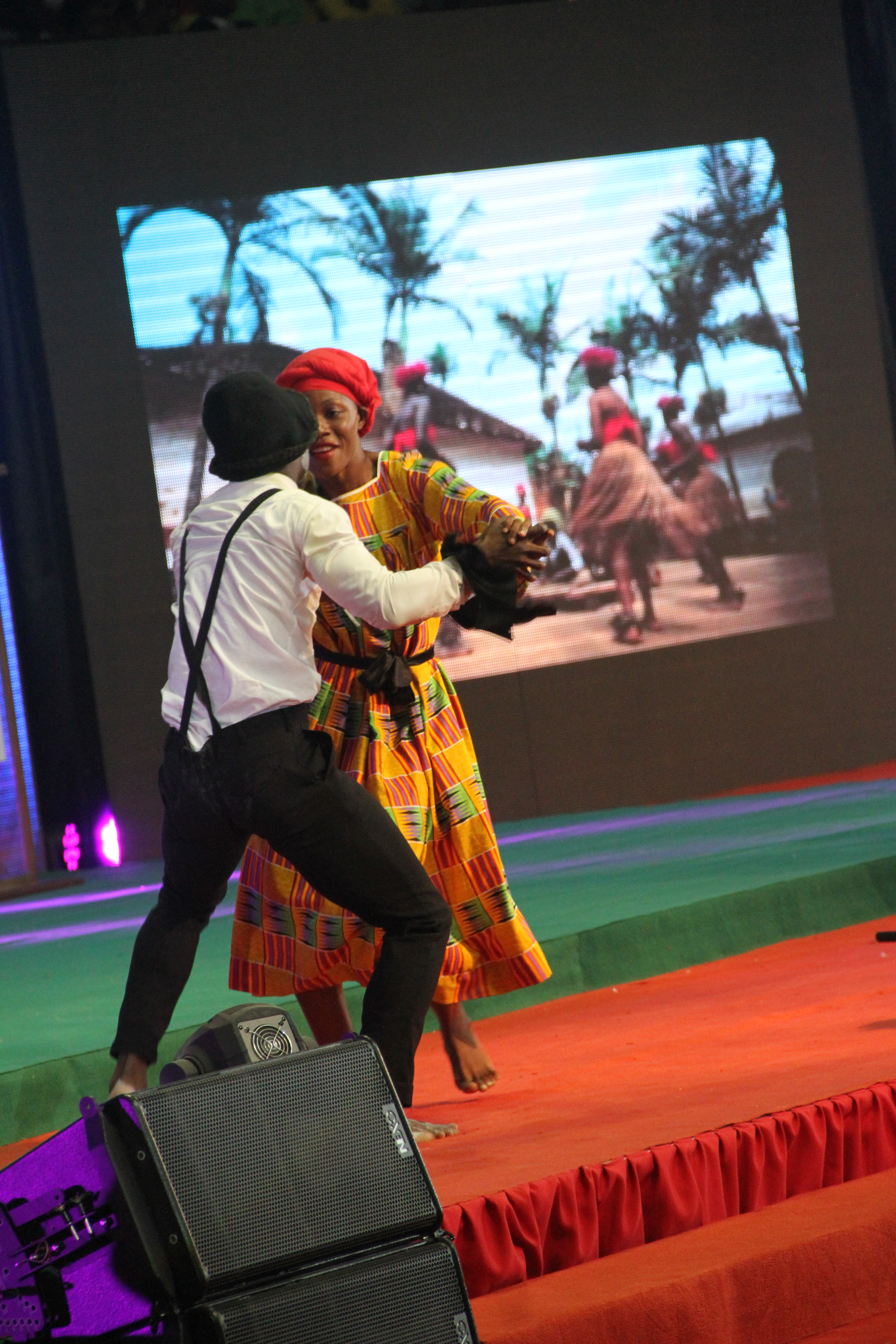

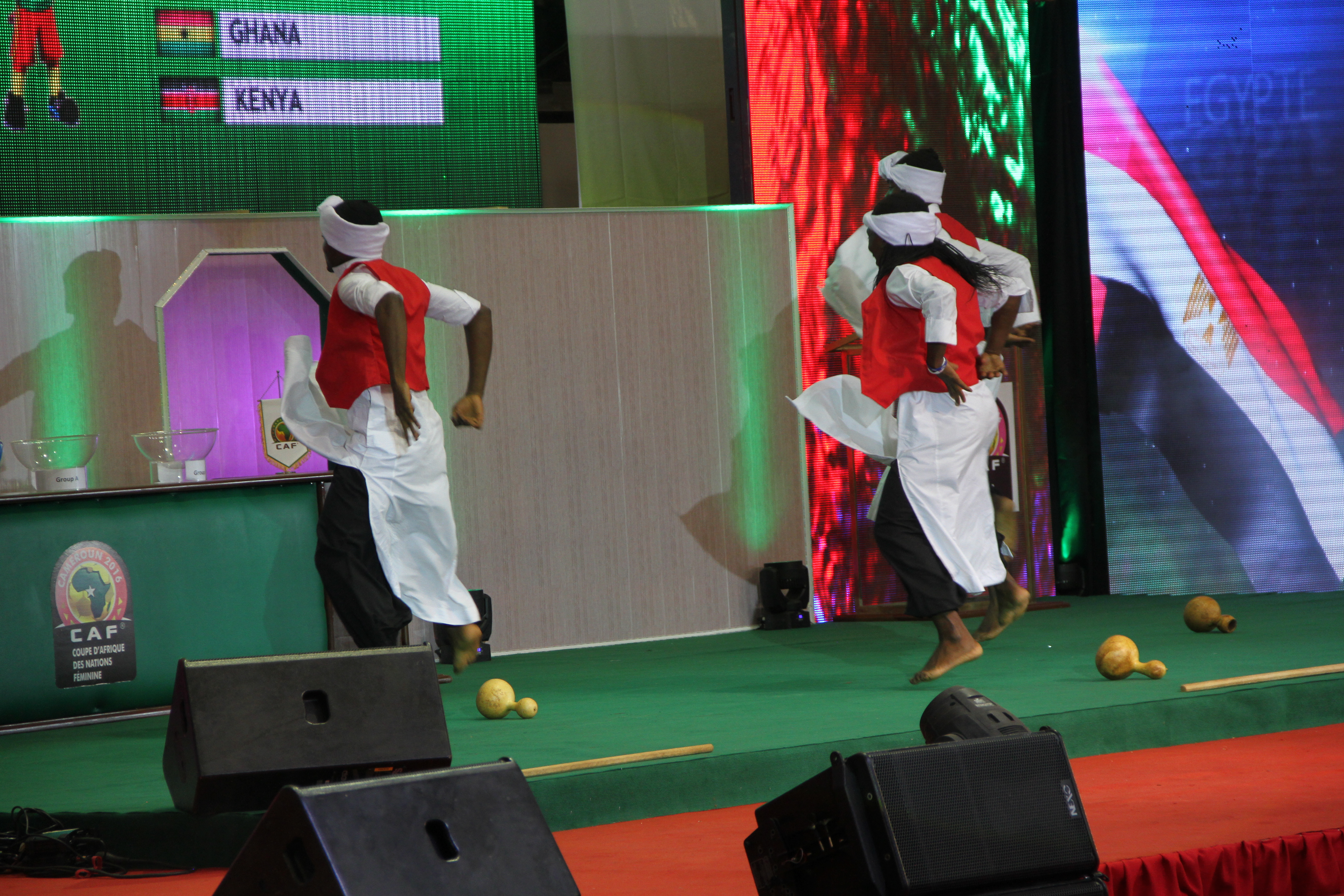

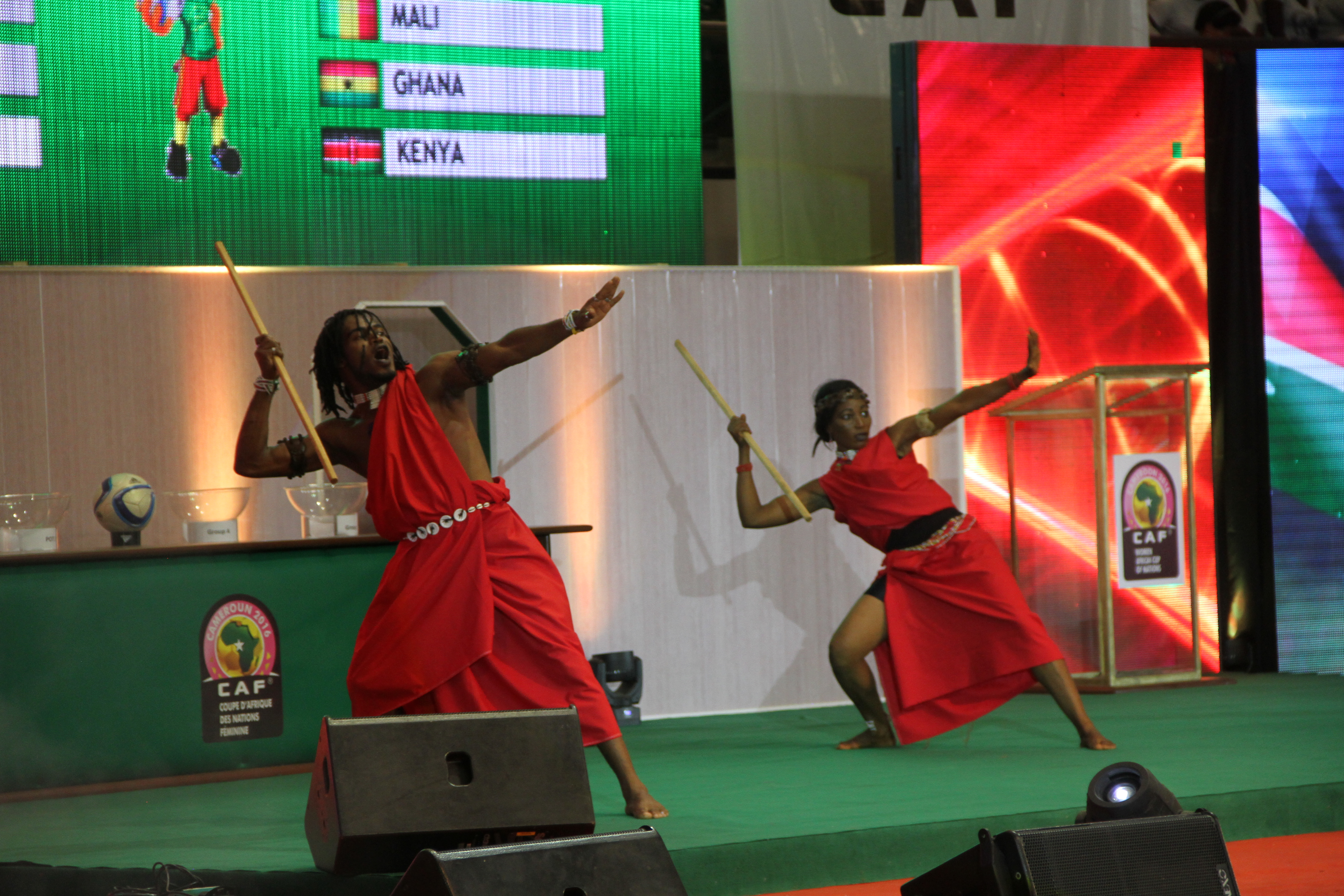

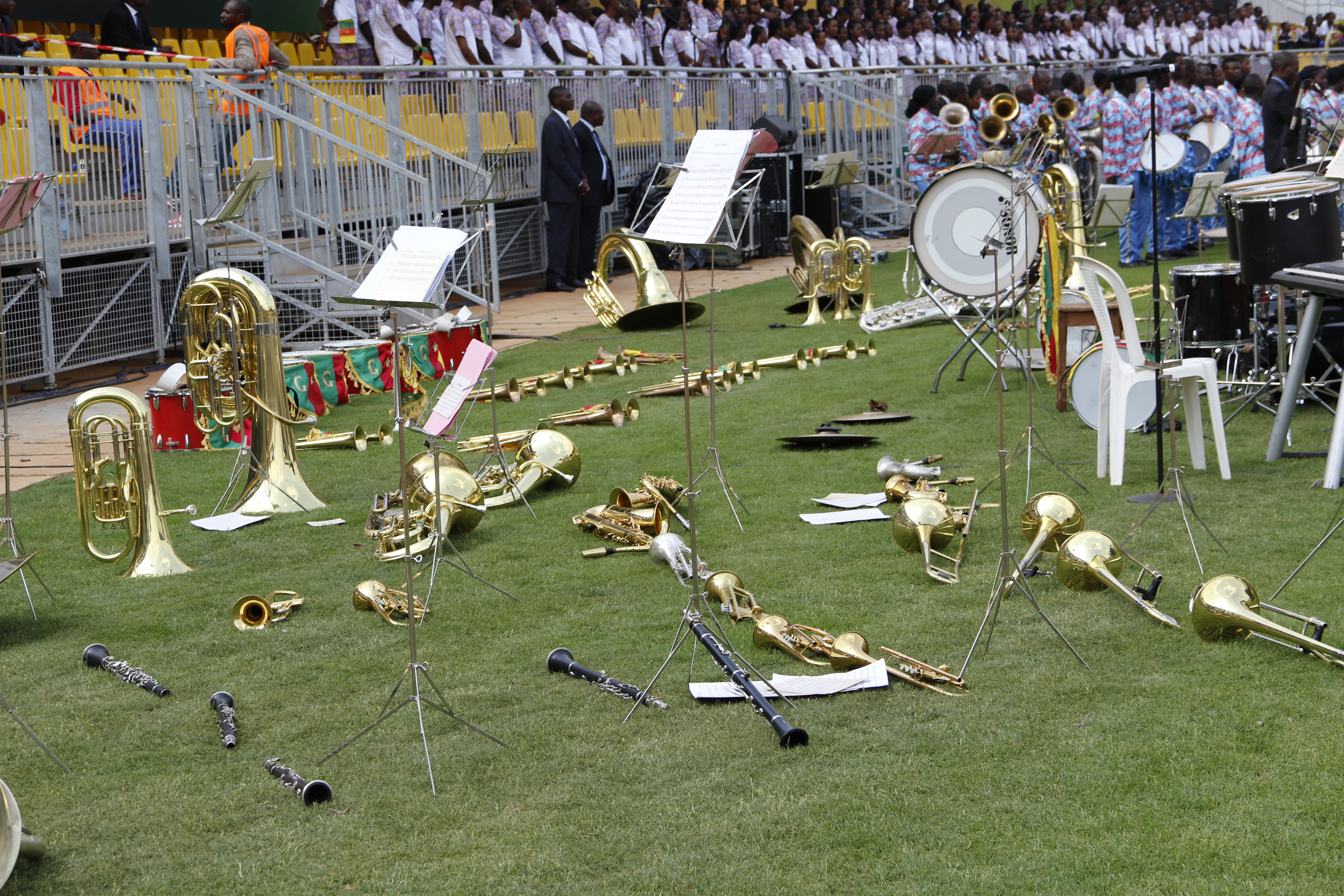
Musical instruments

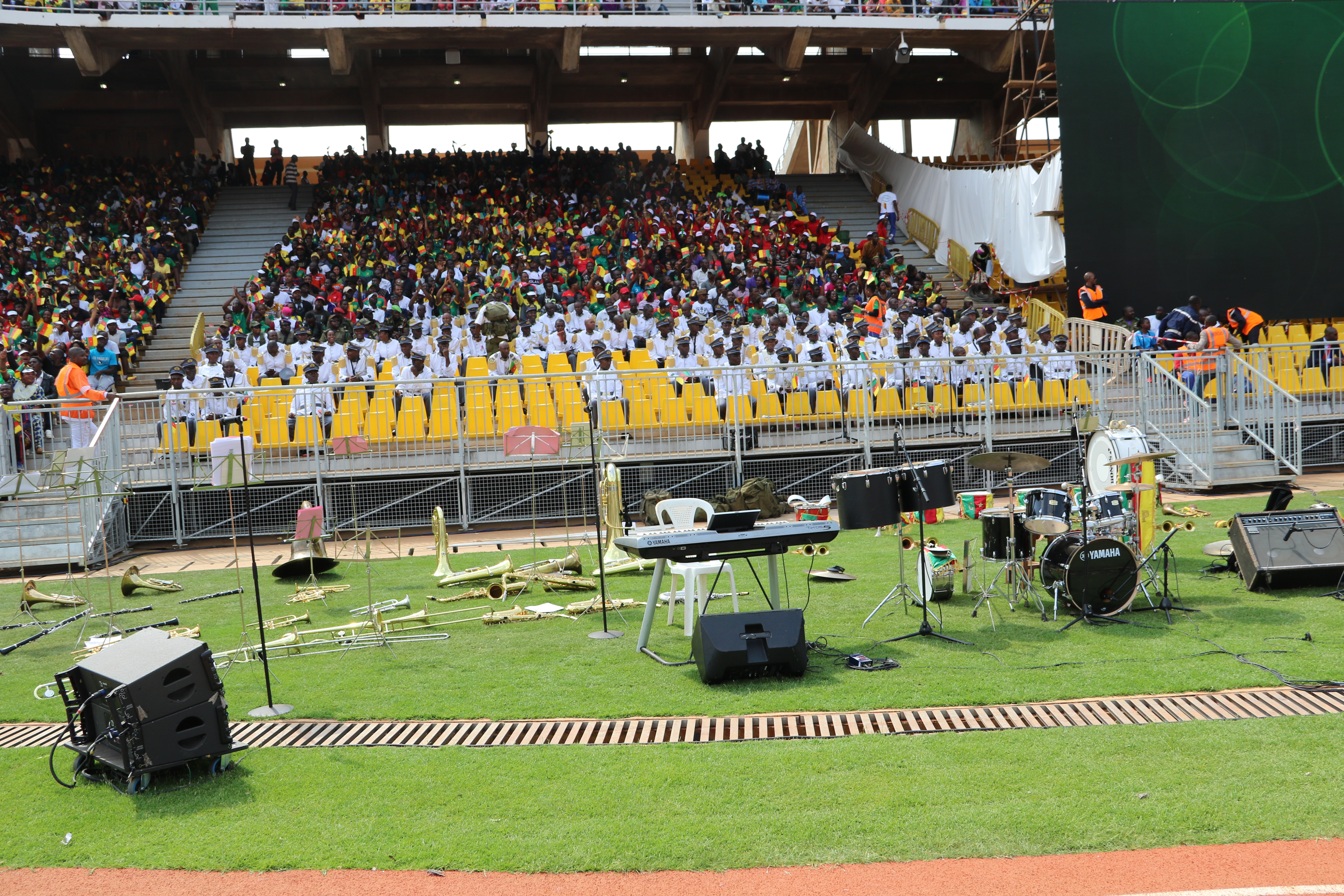

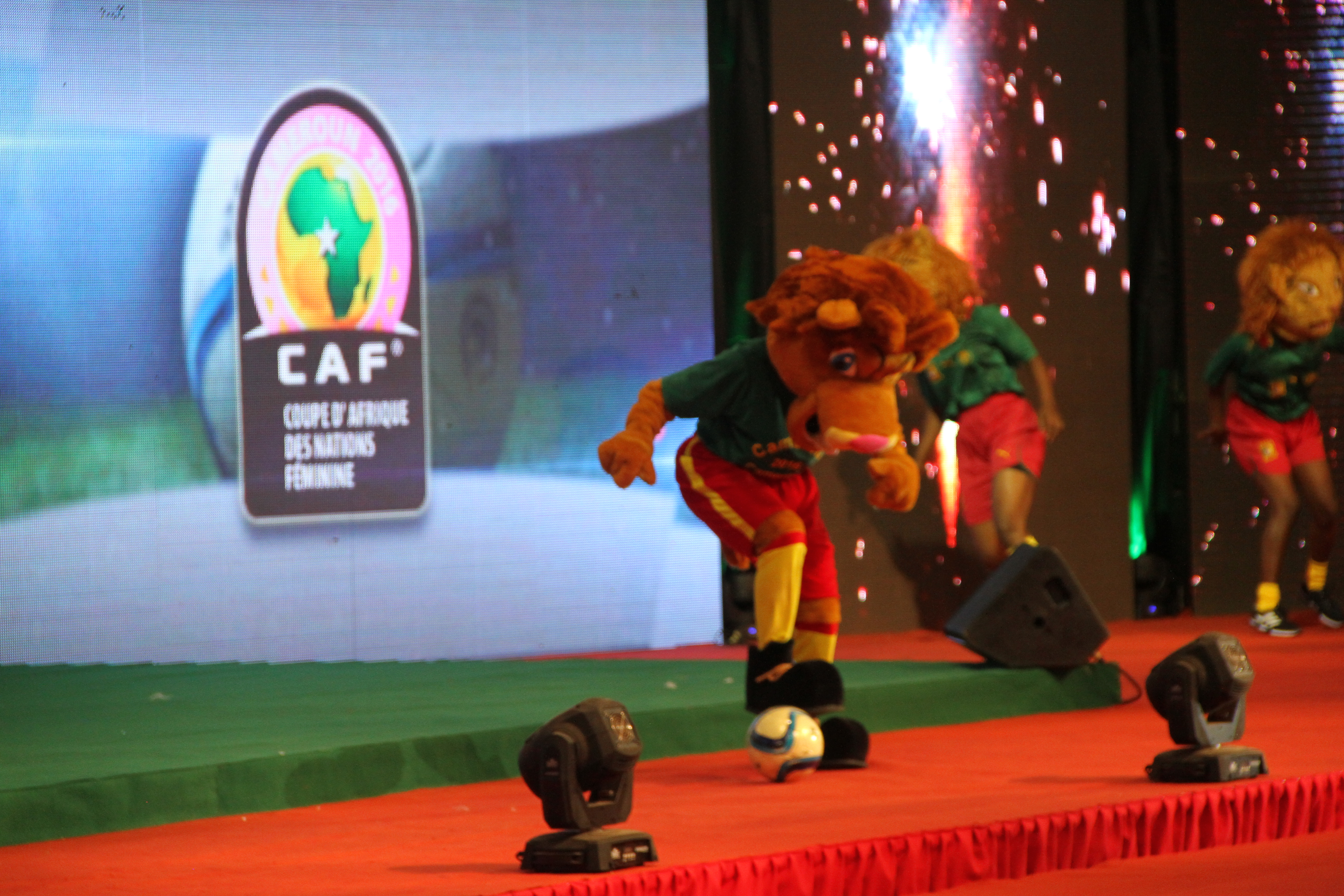

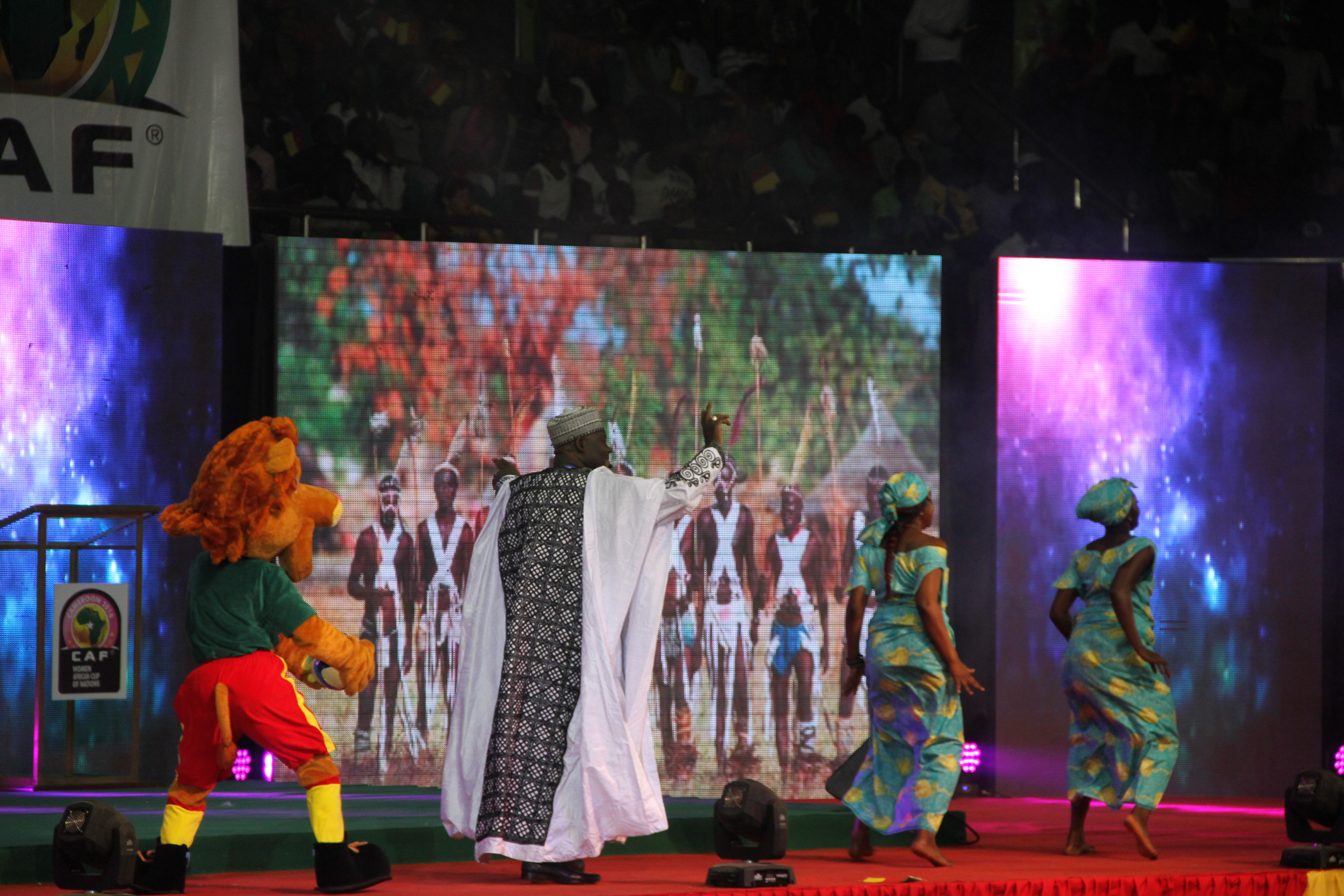

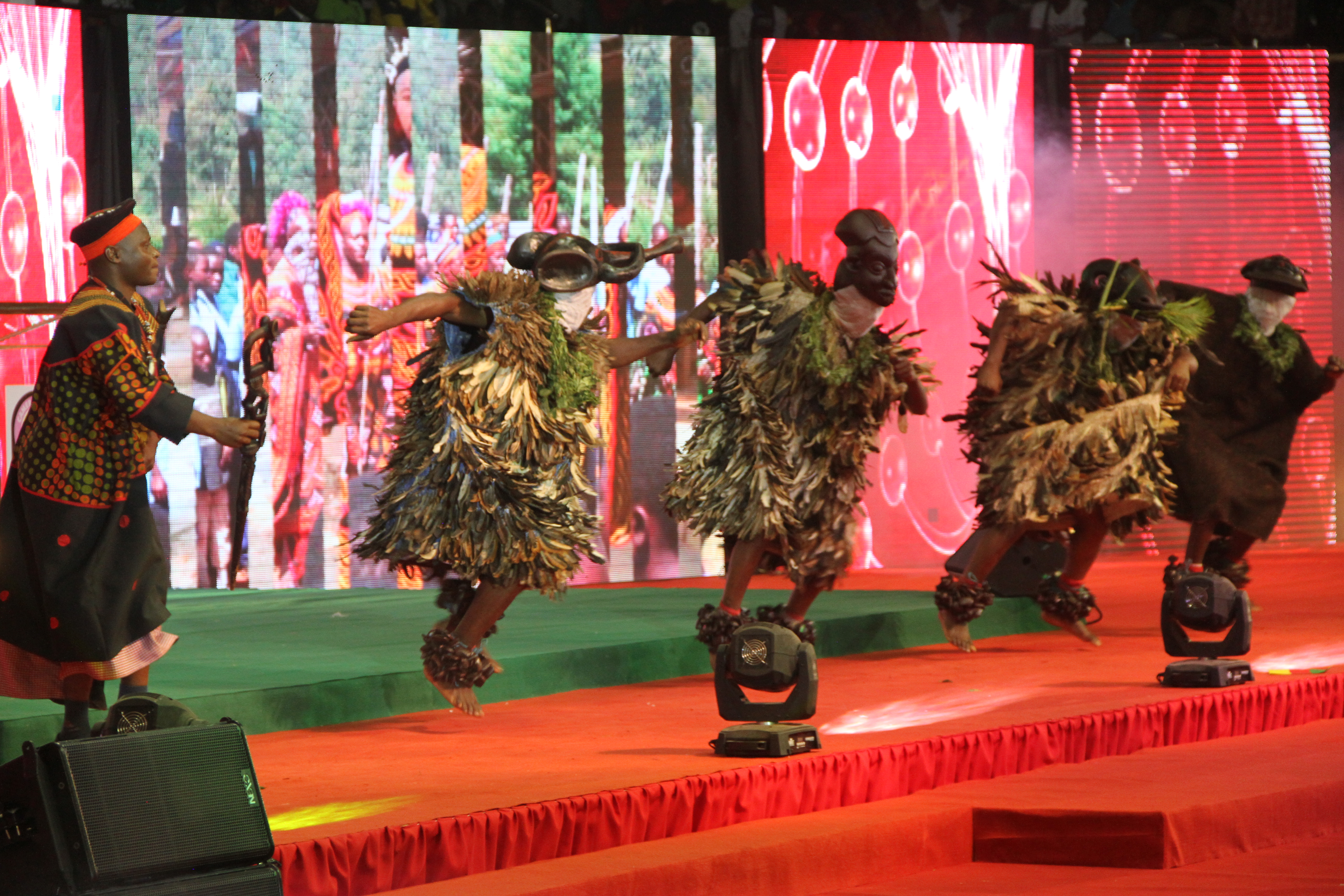

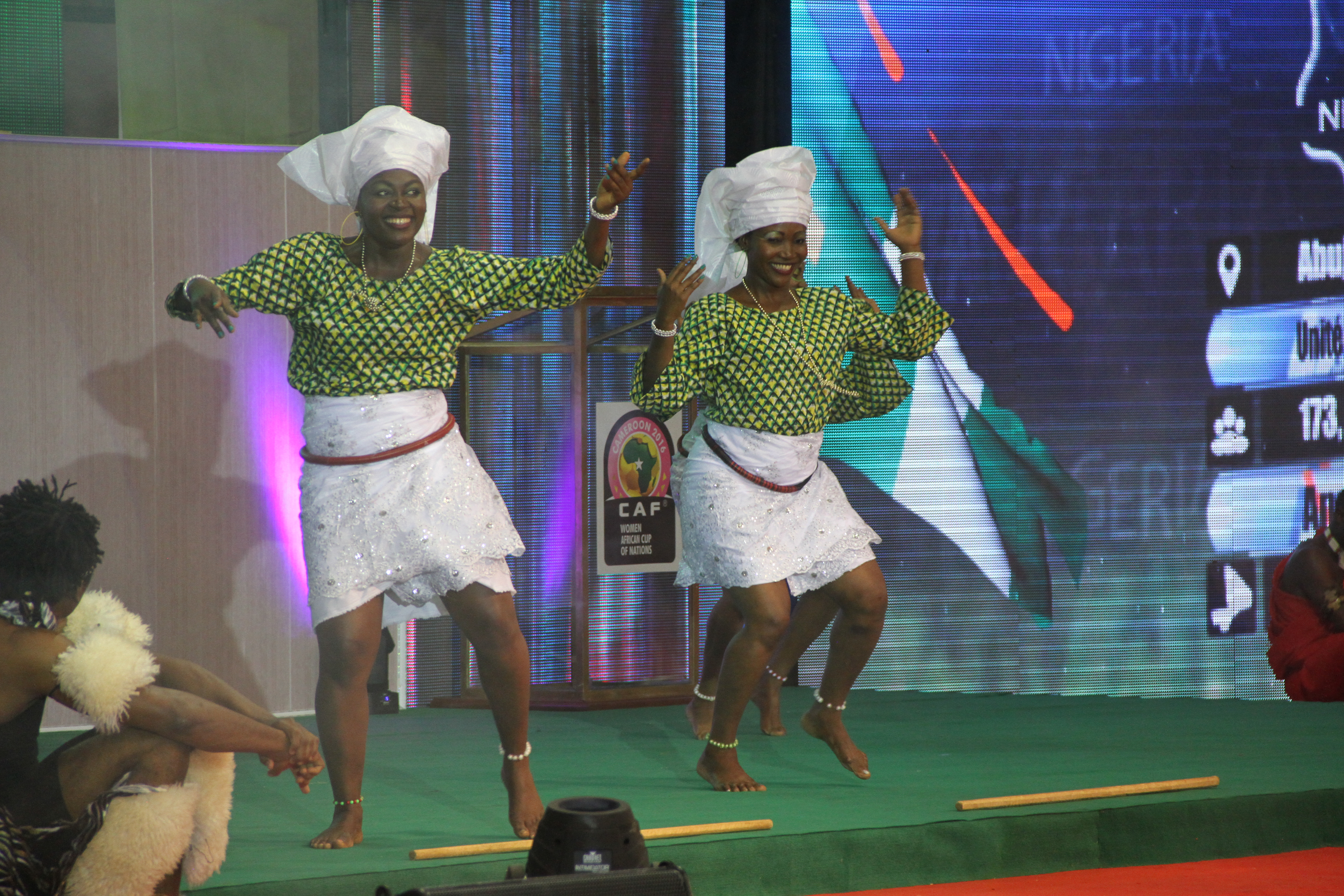

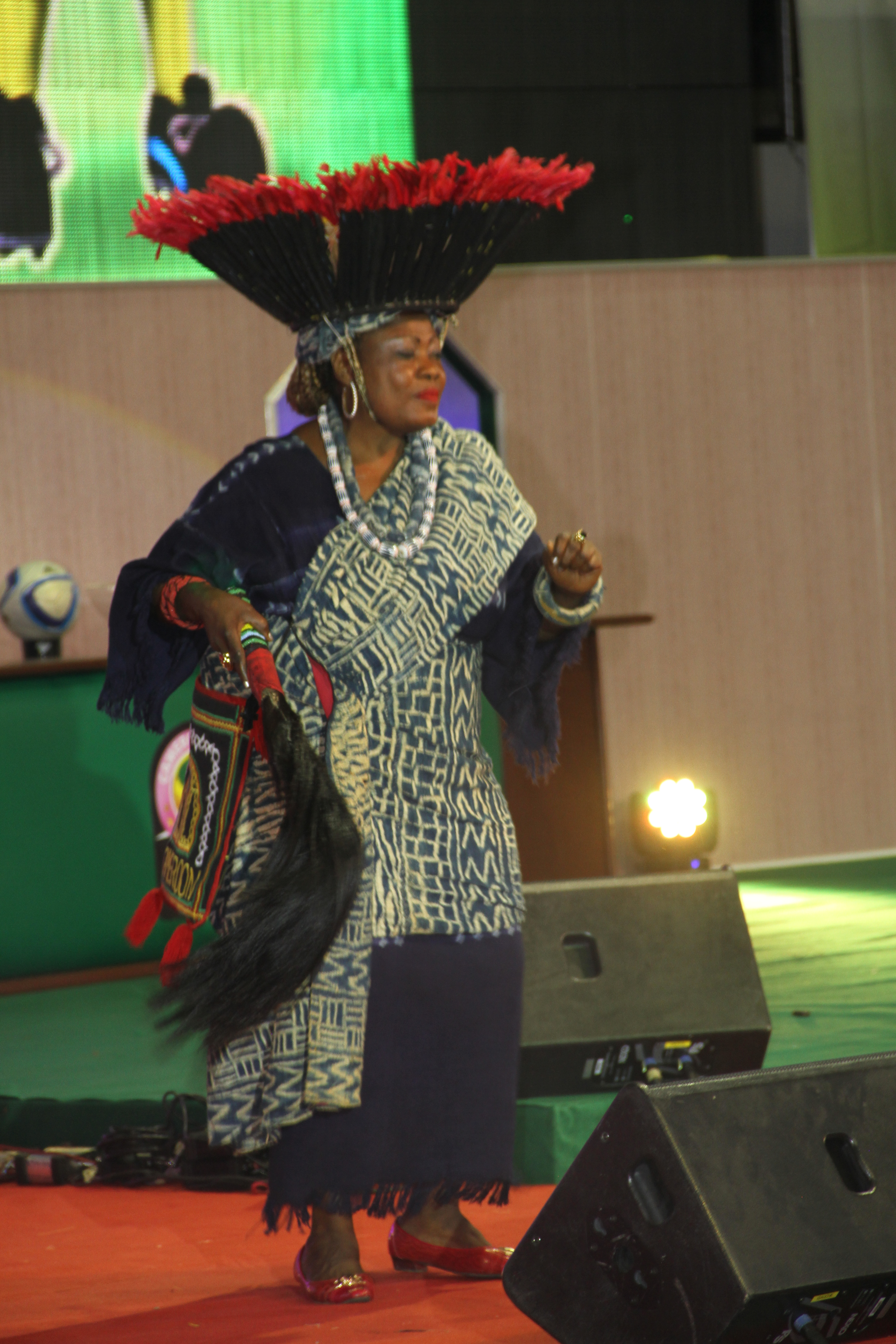
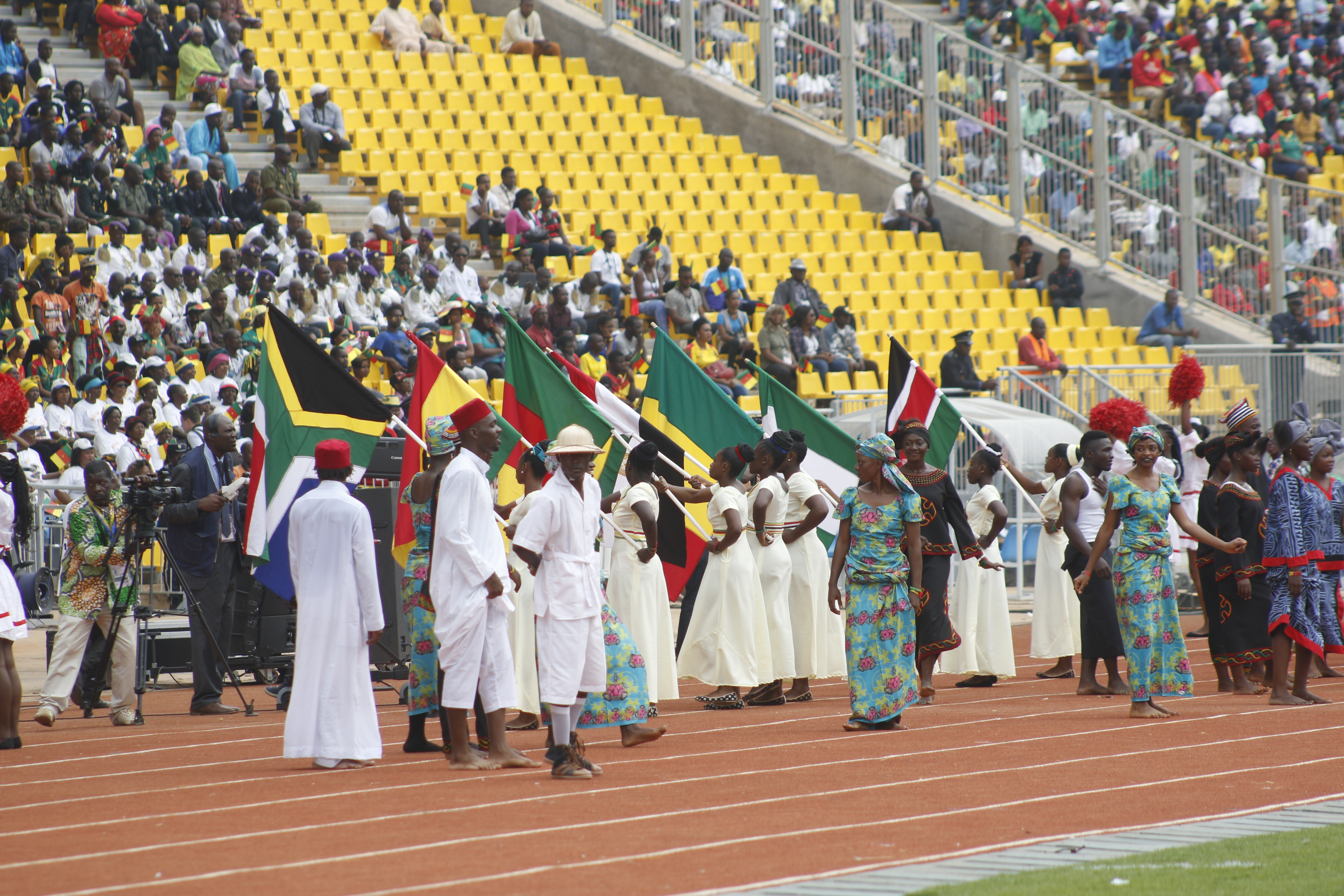
Opening Ceremony in Yaoundé, Cameroon

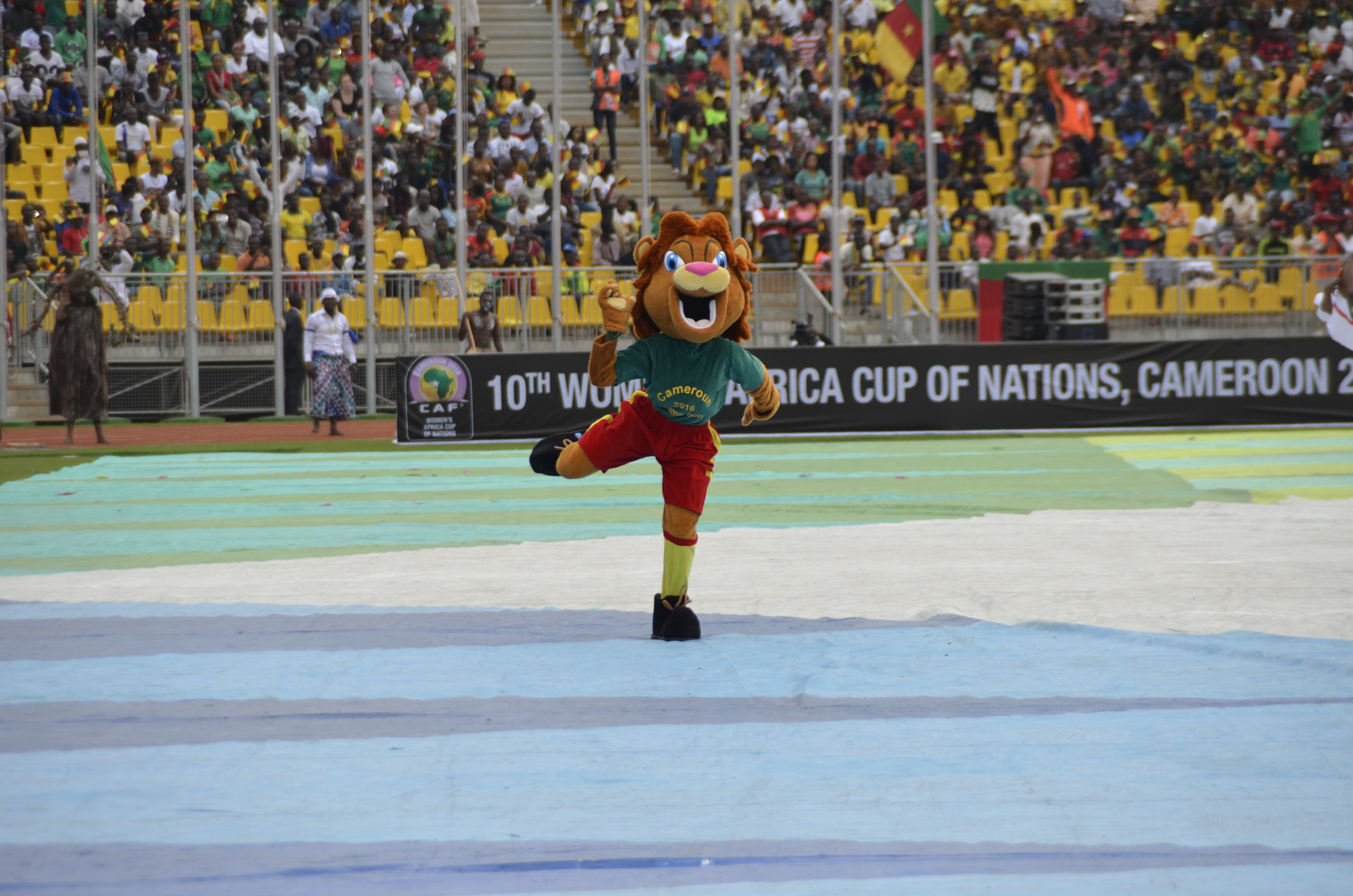

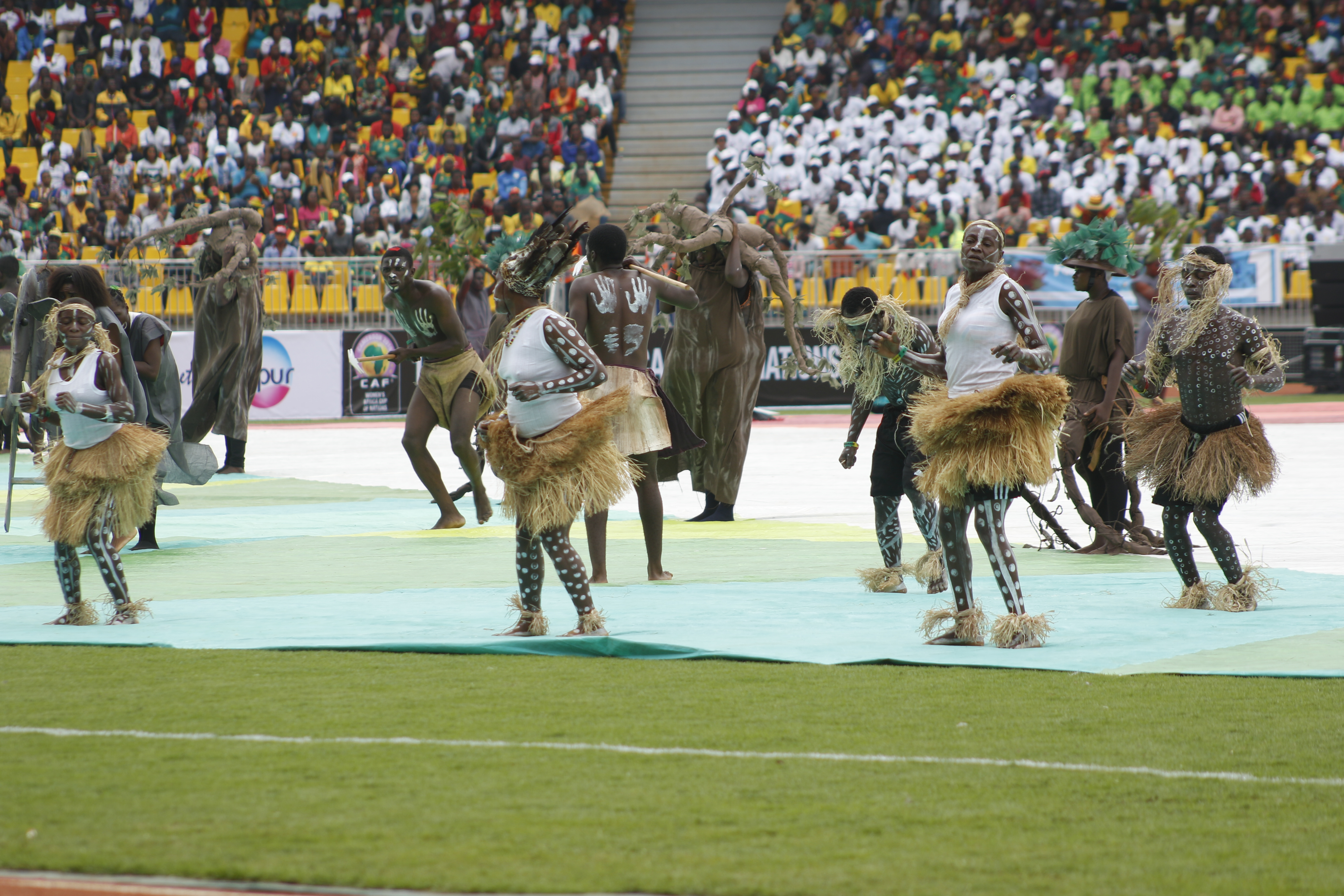

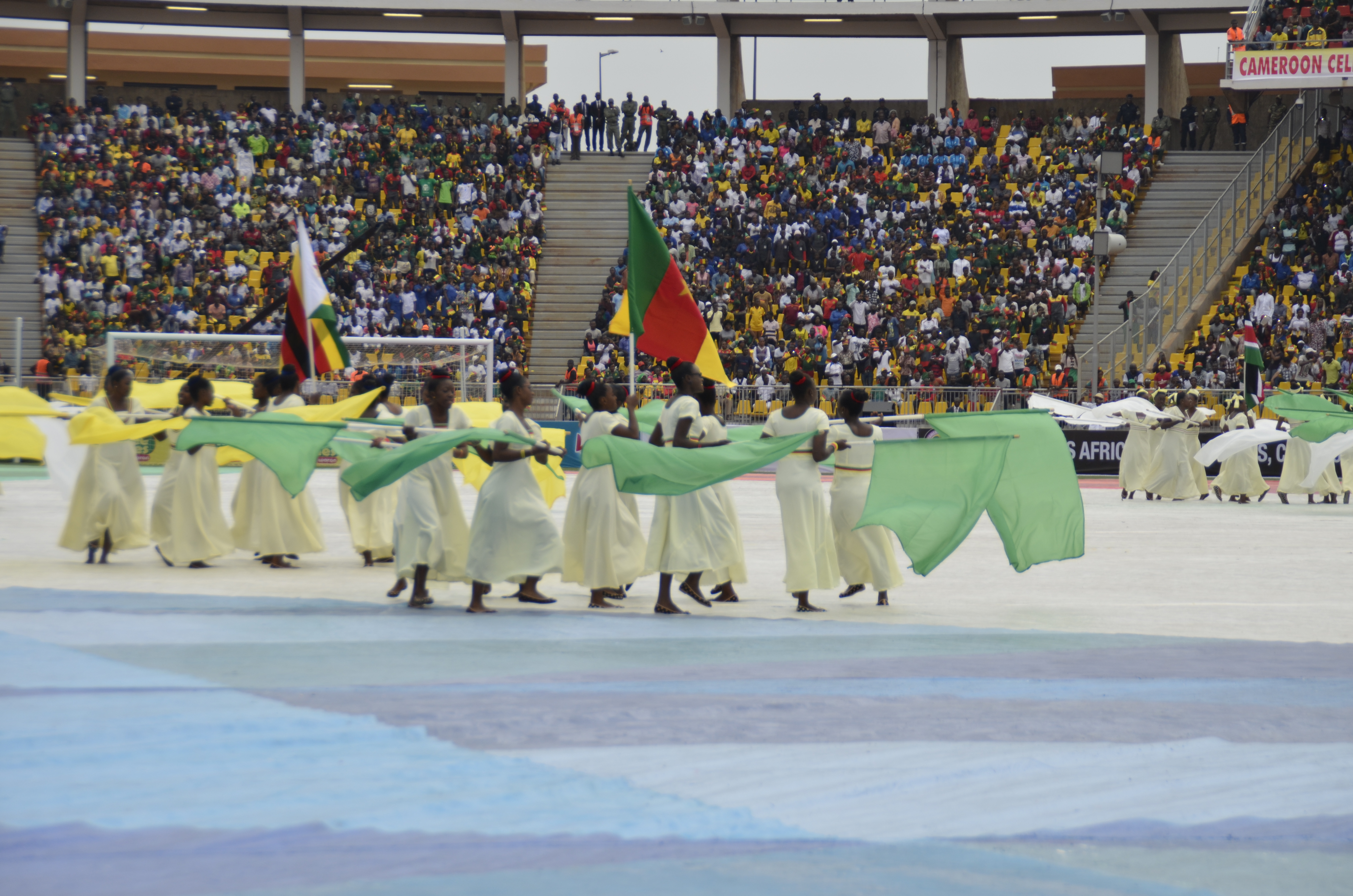

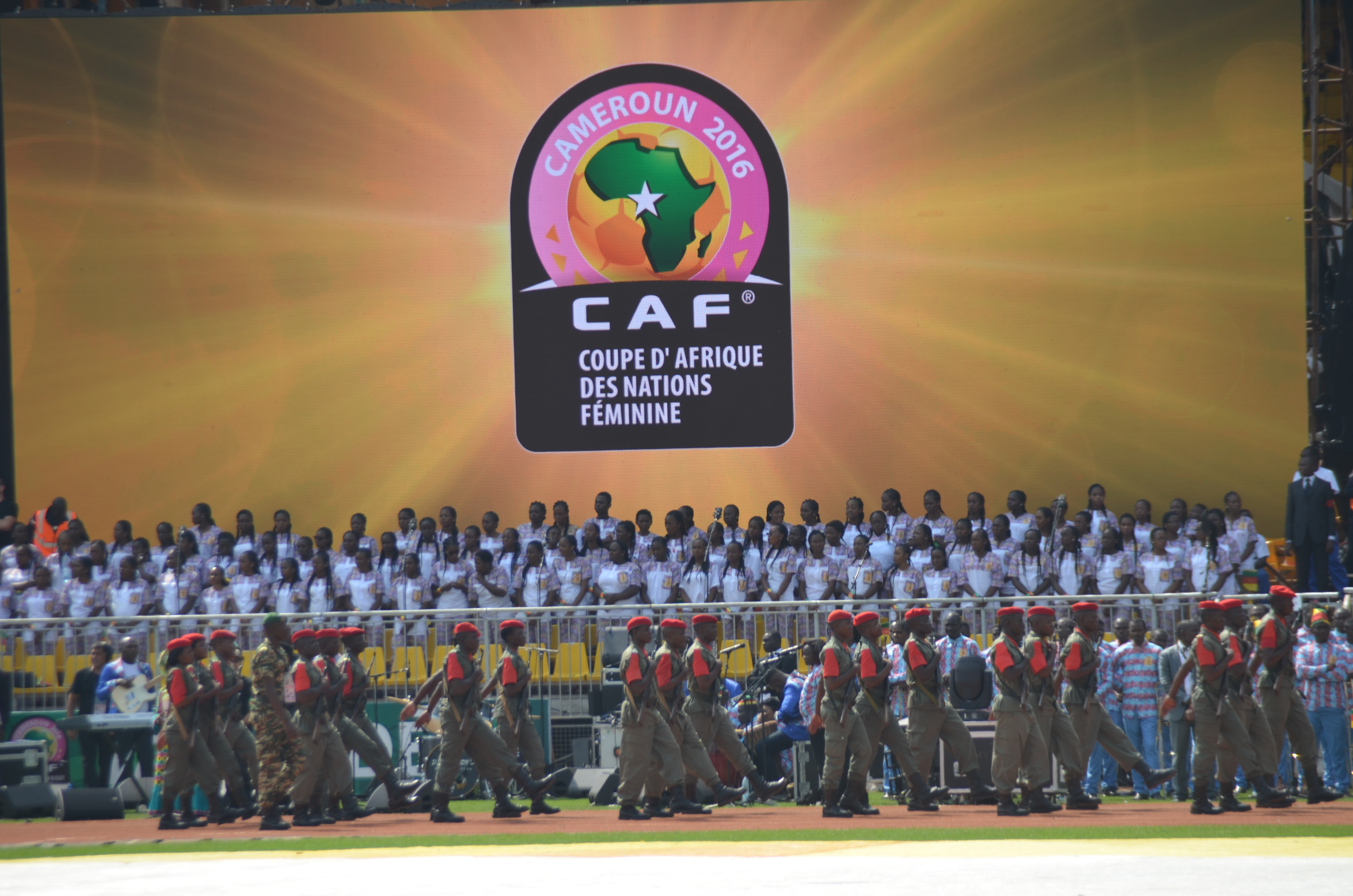

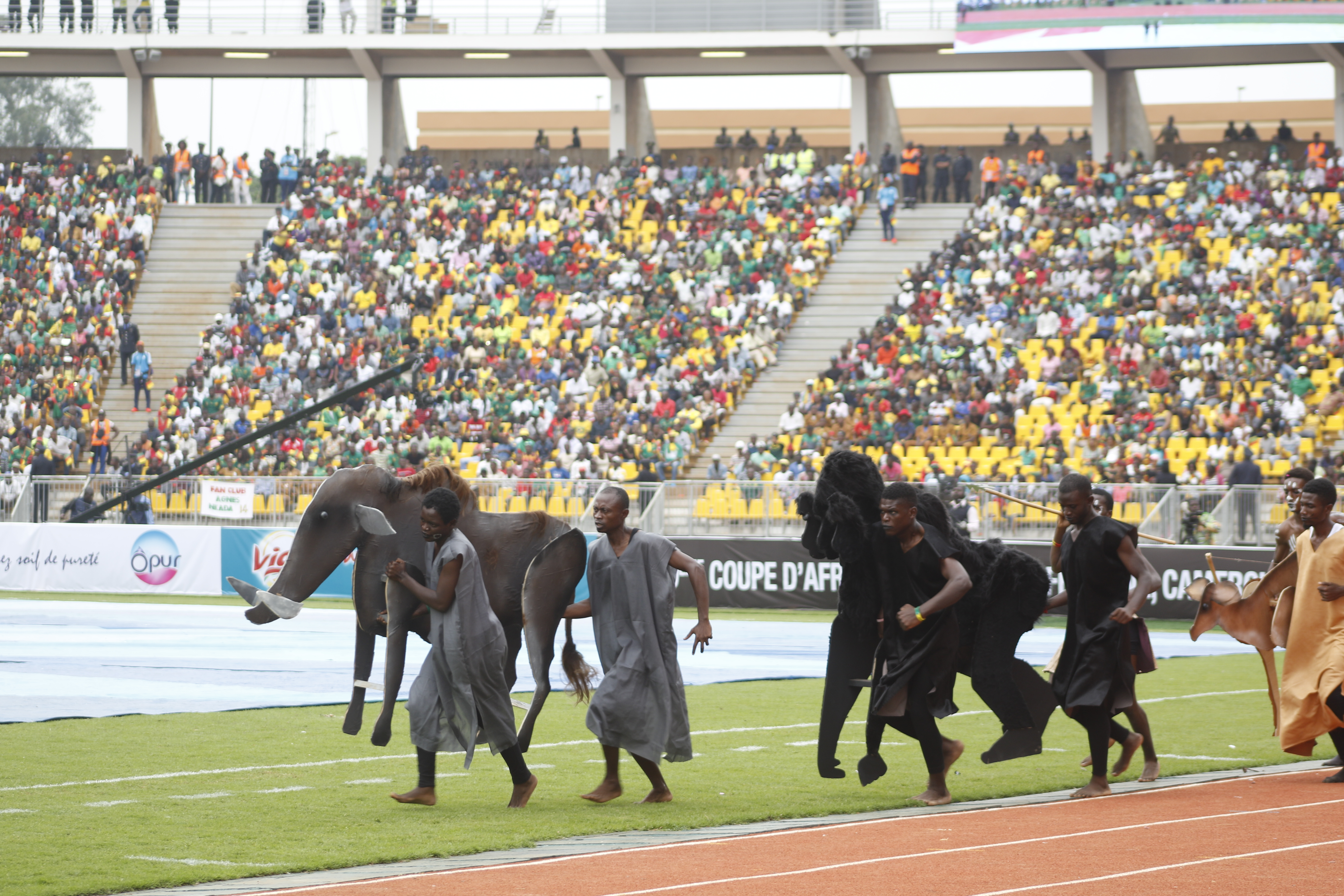

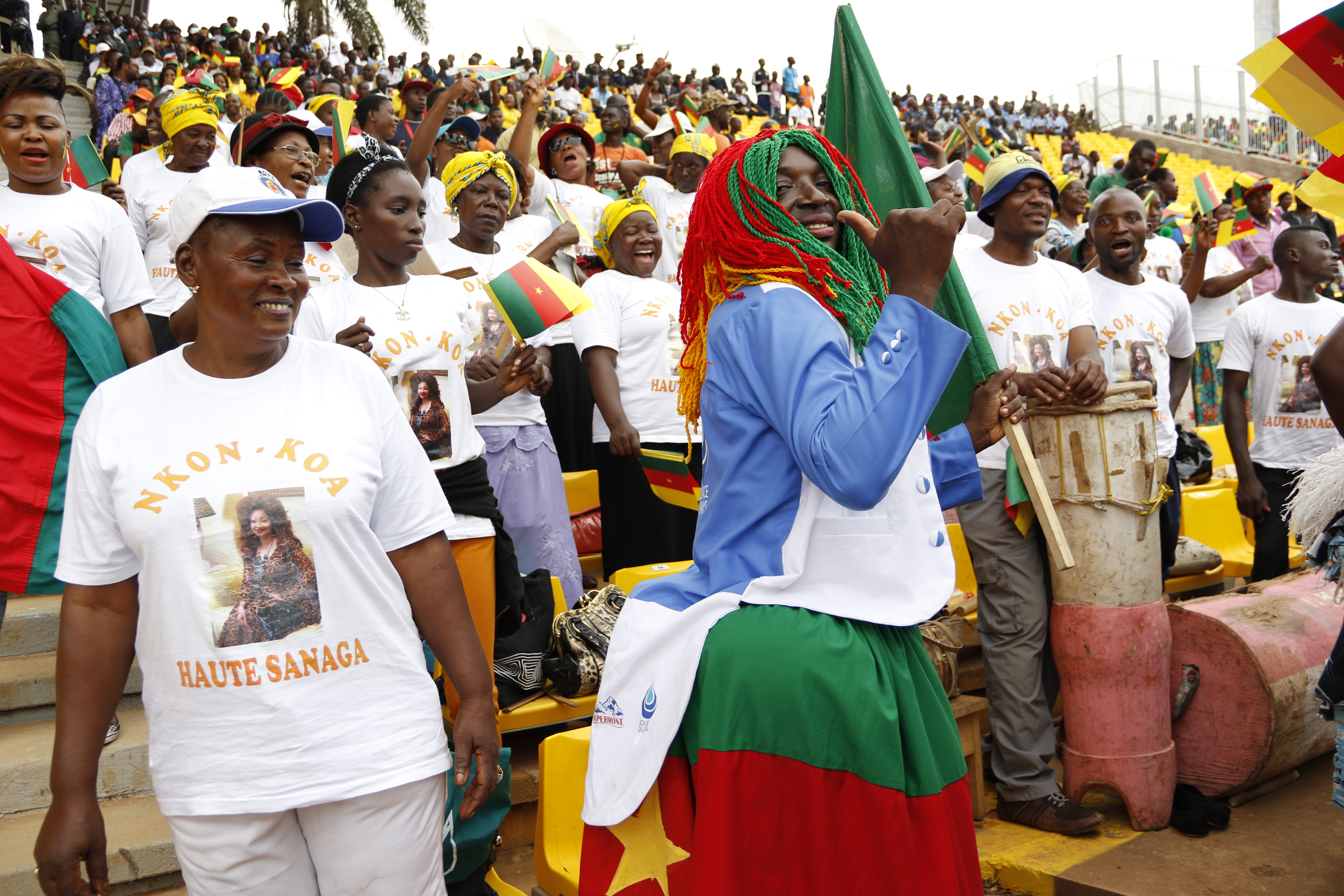

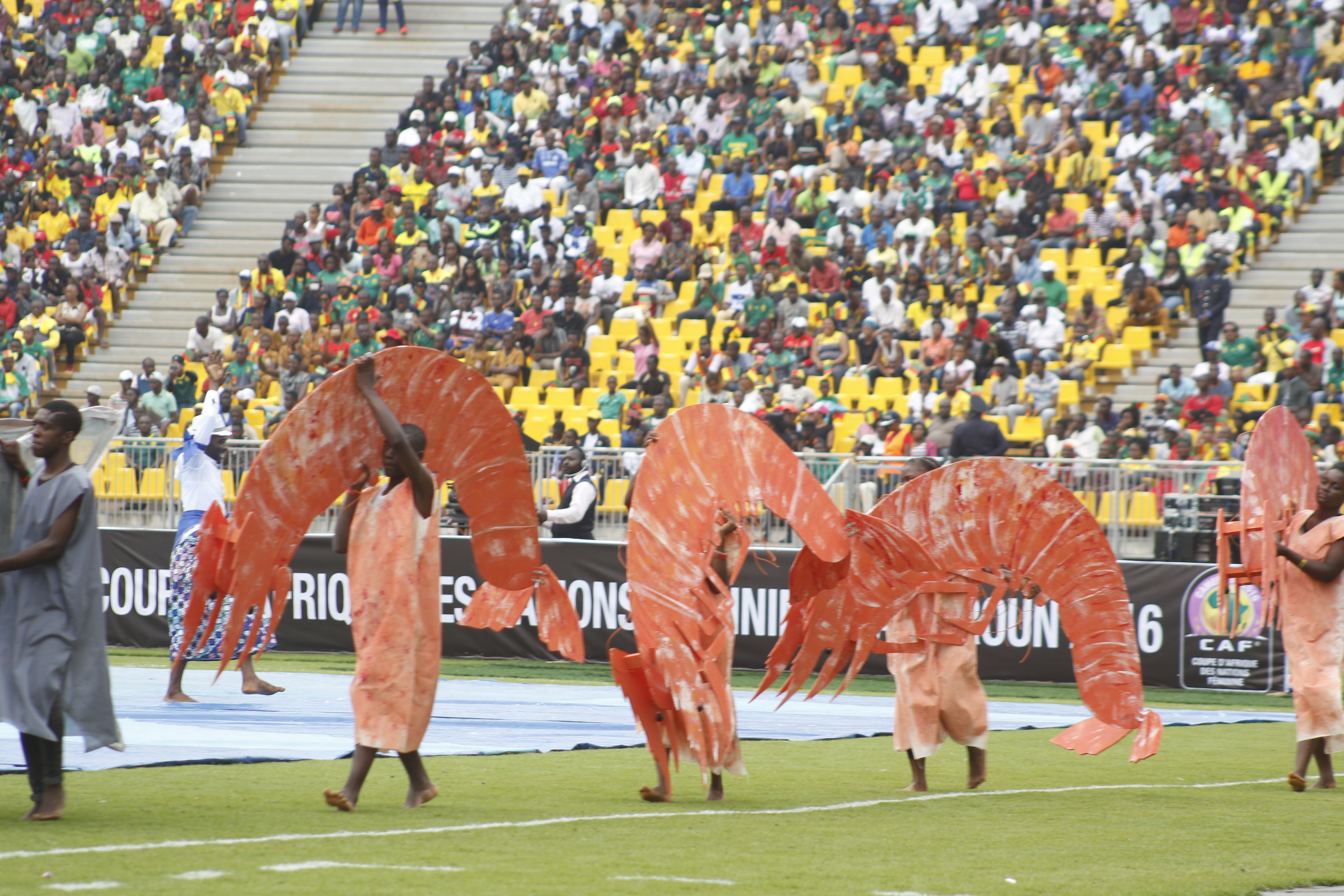

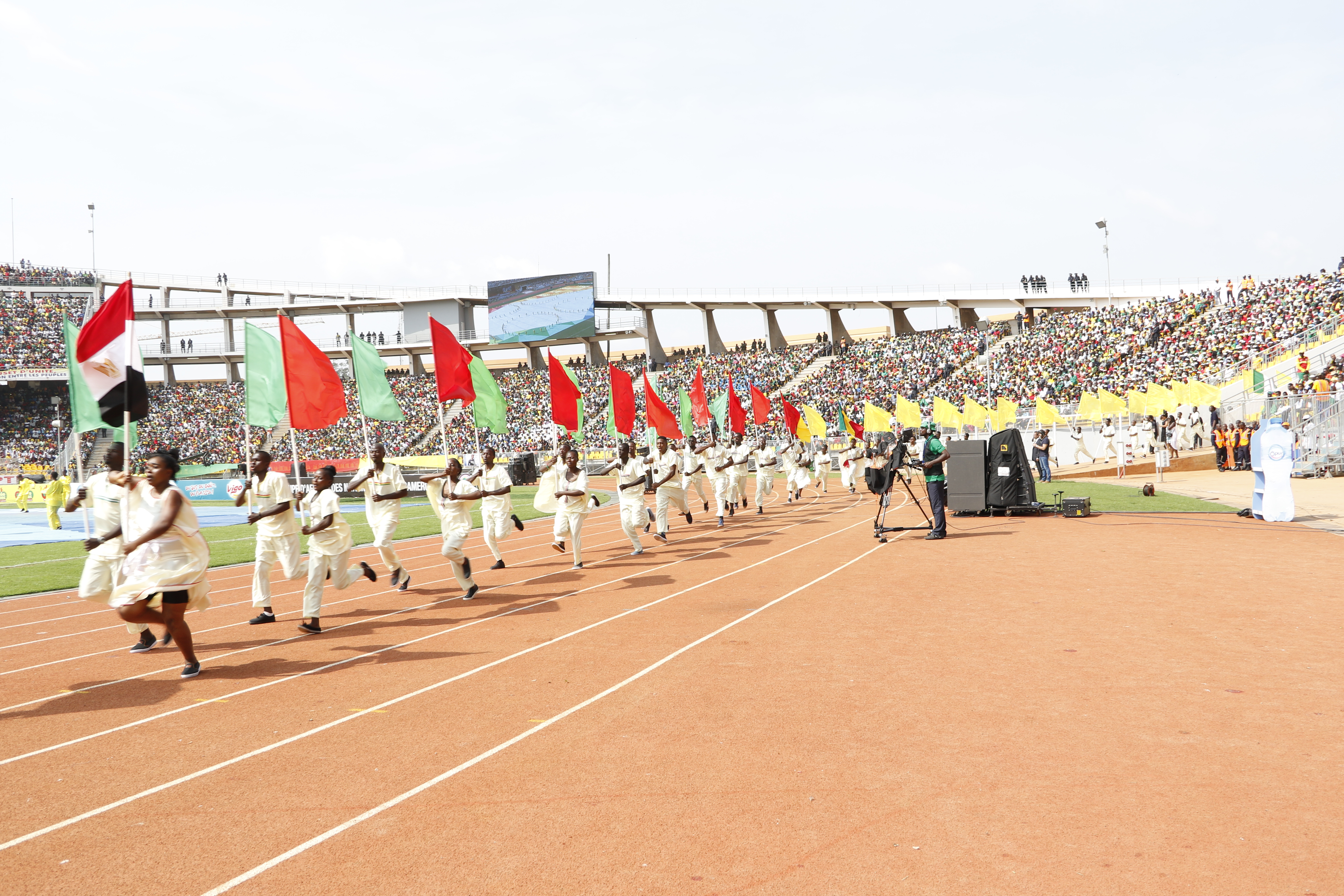

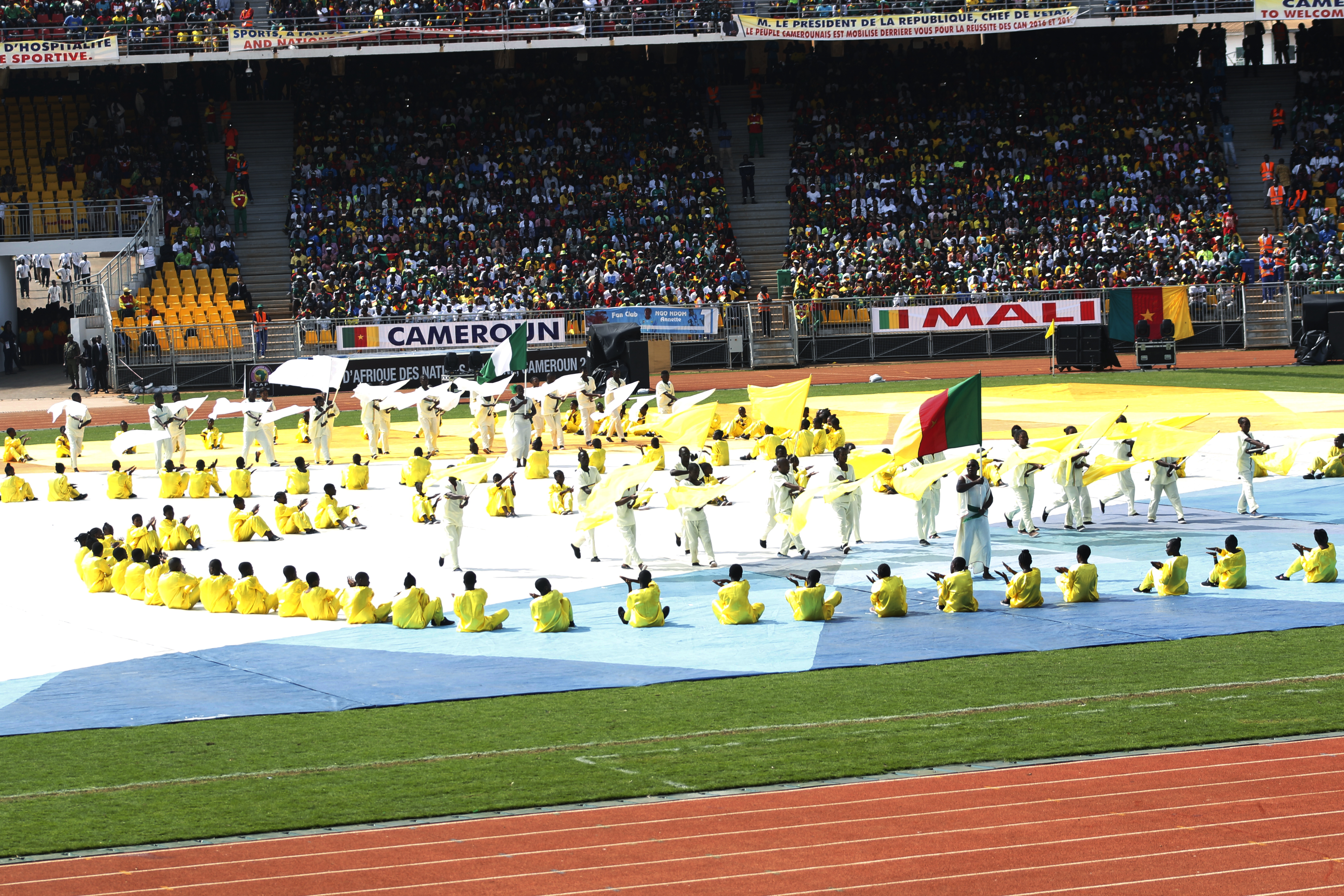

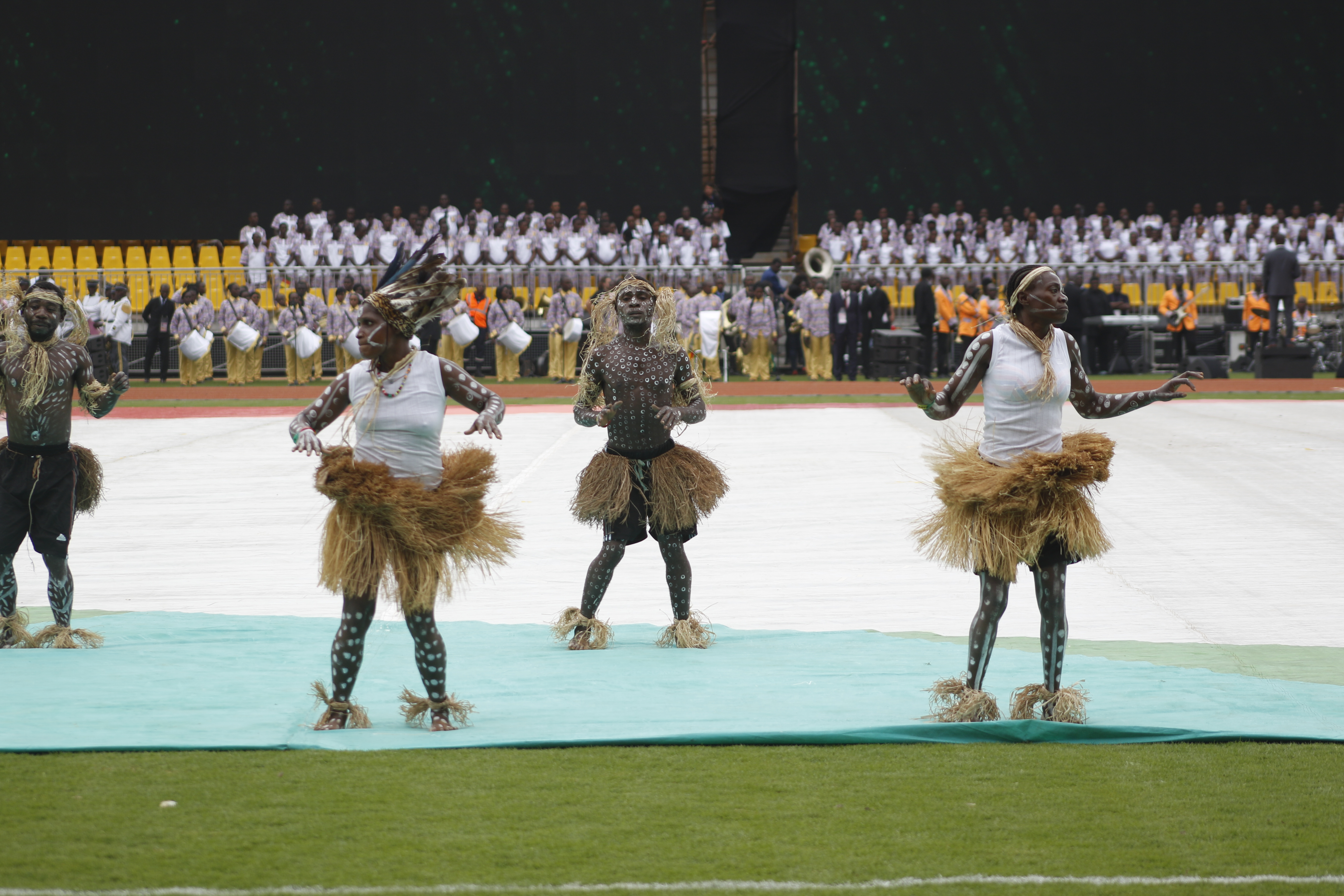

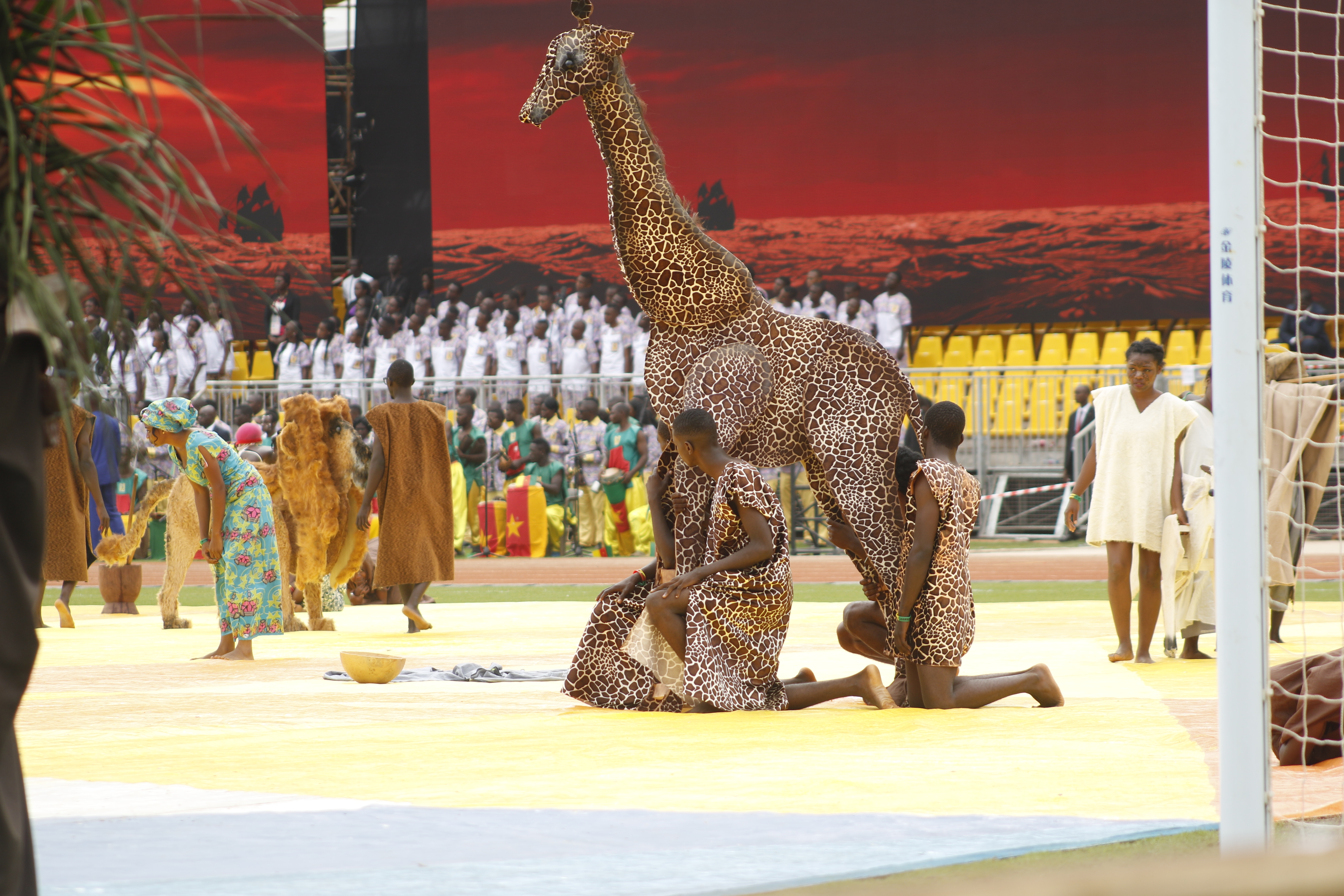

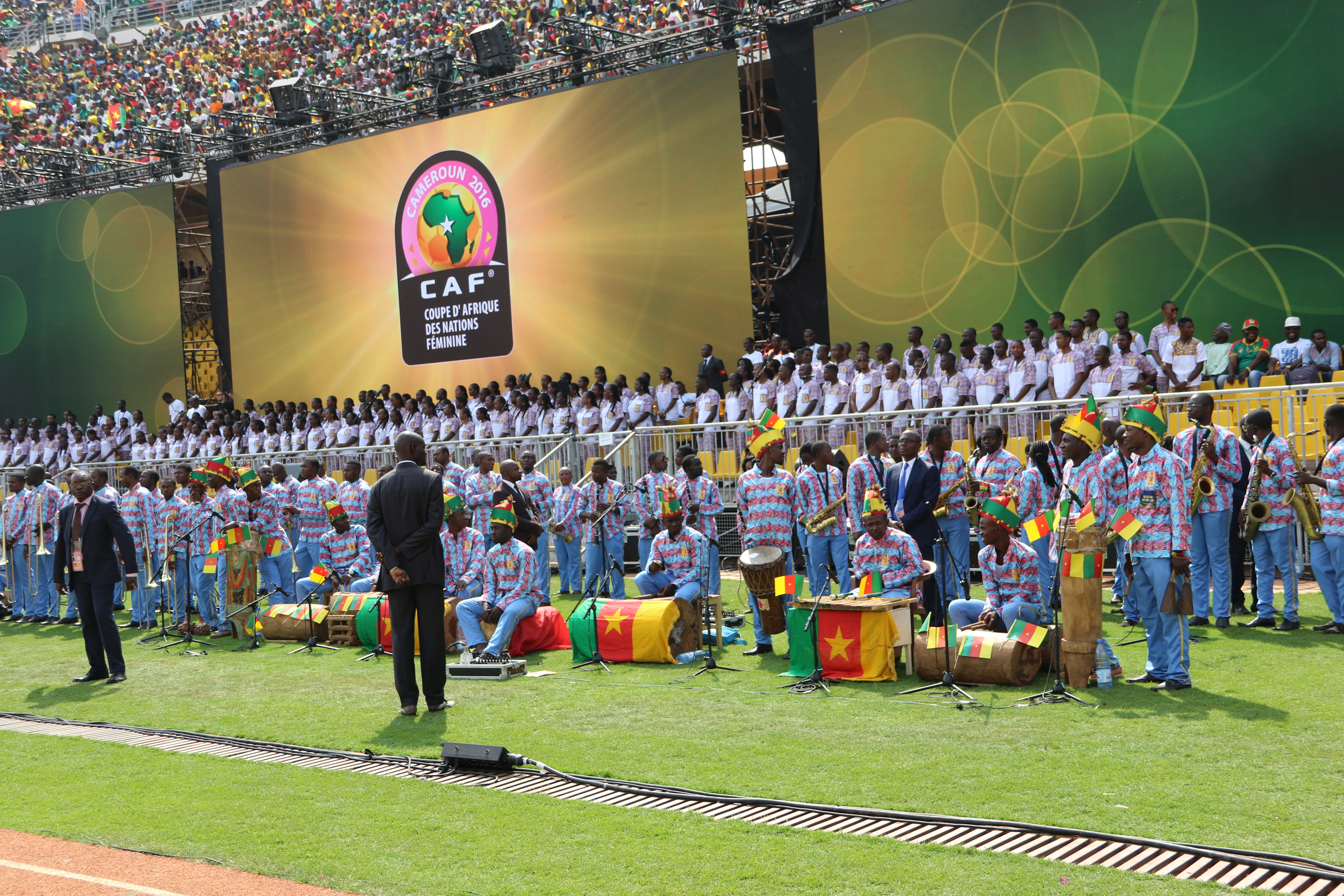

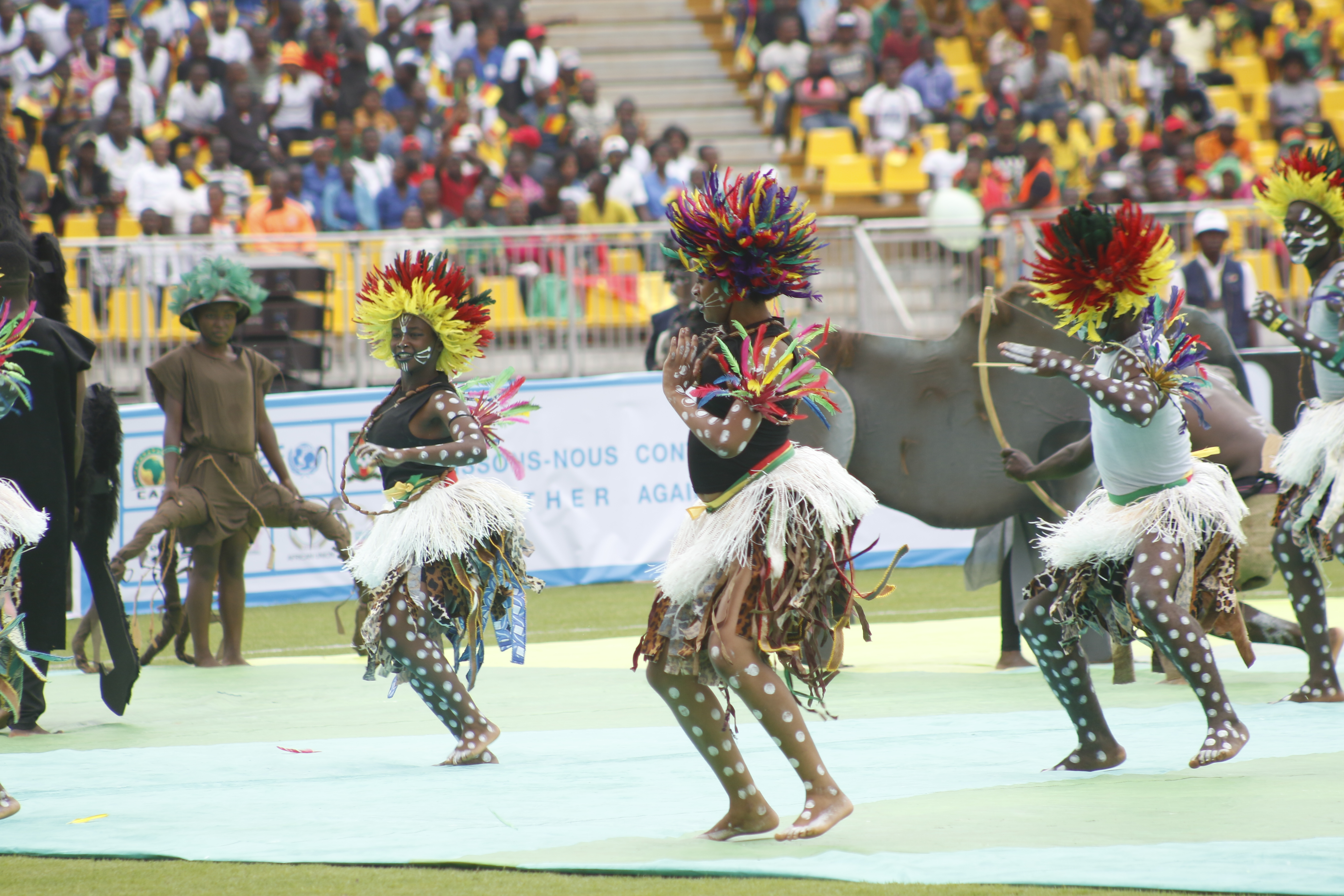

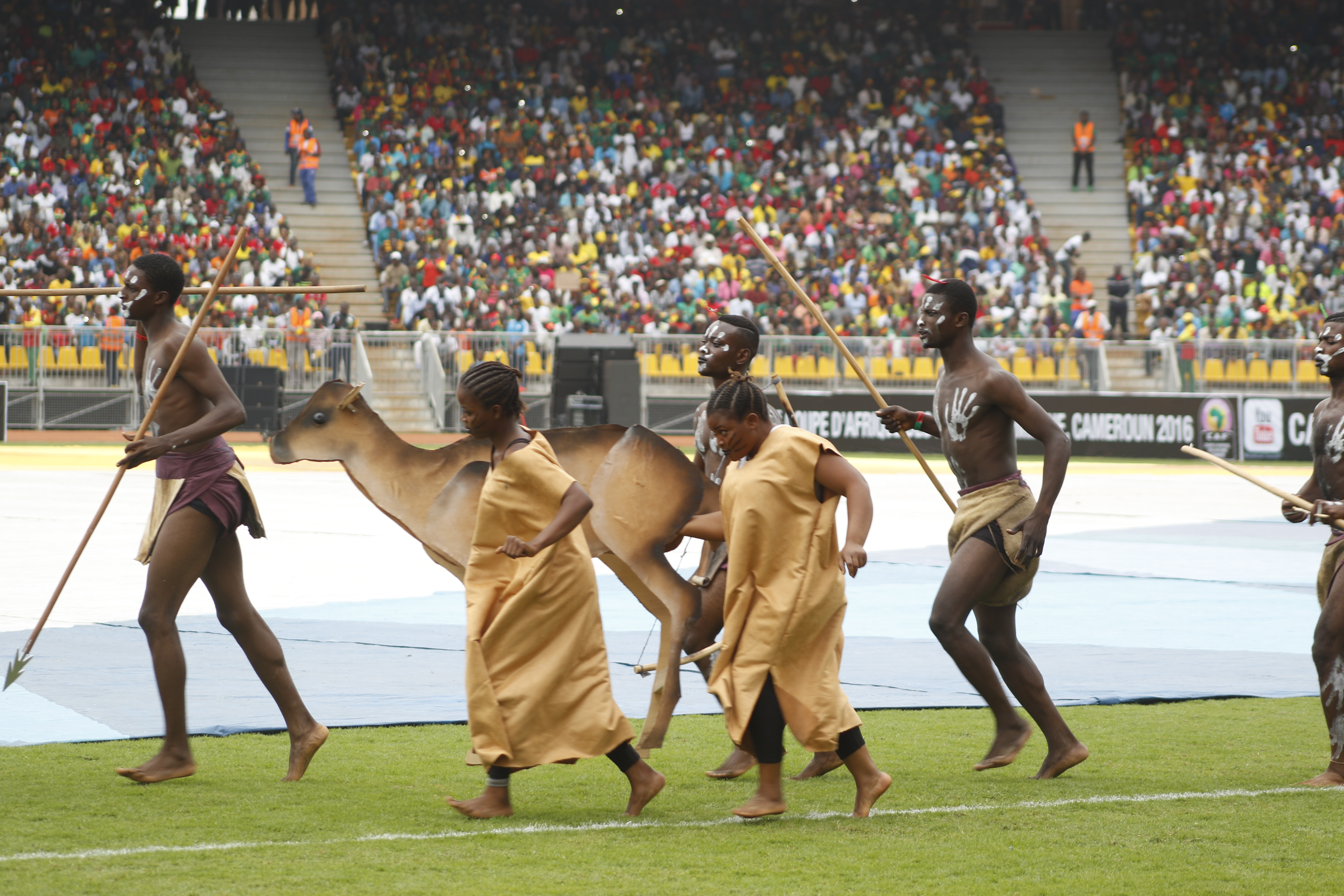

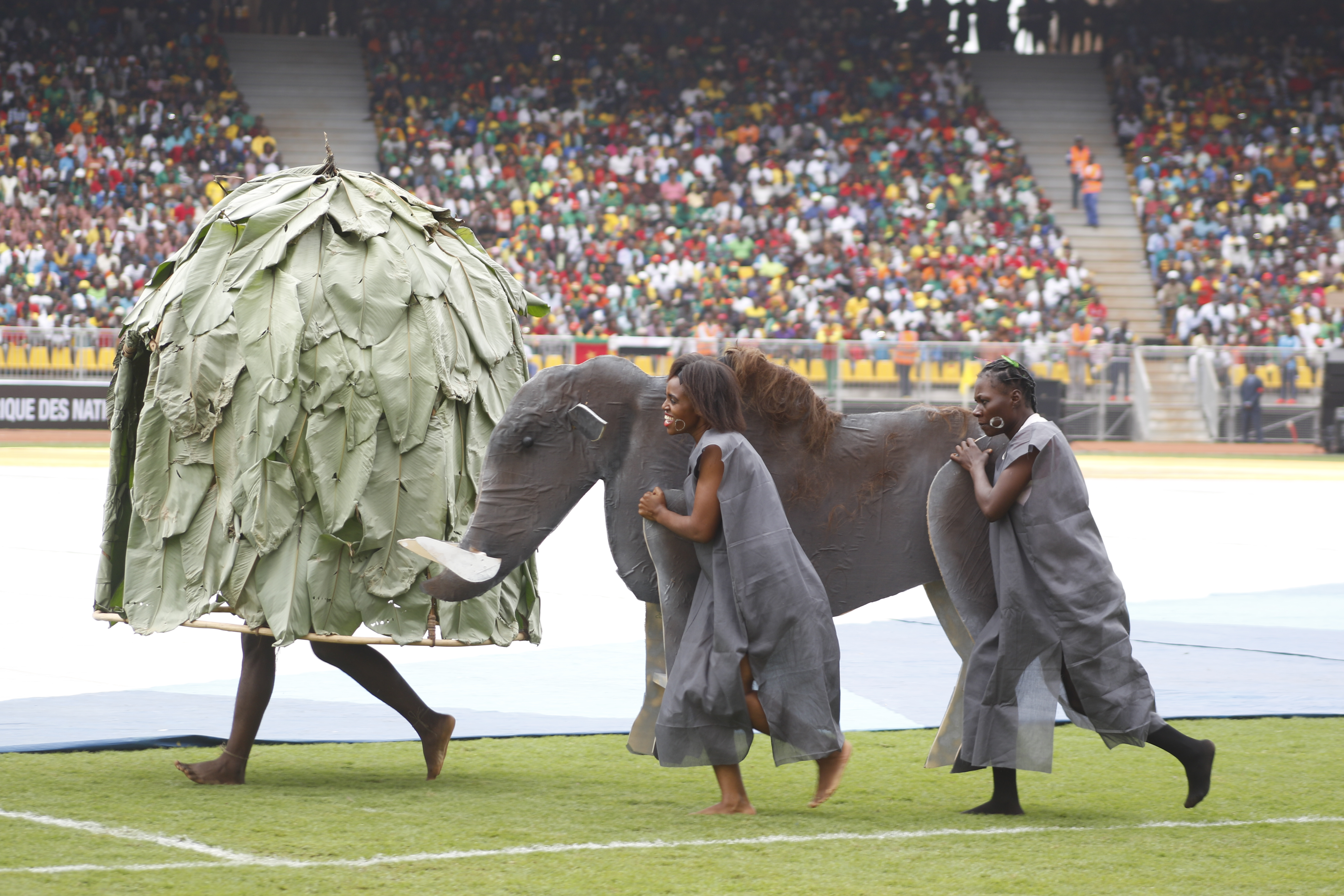

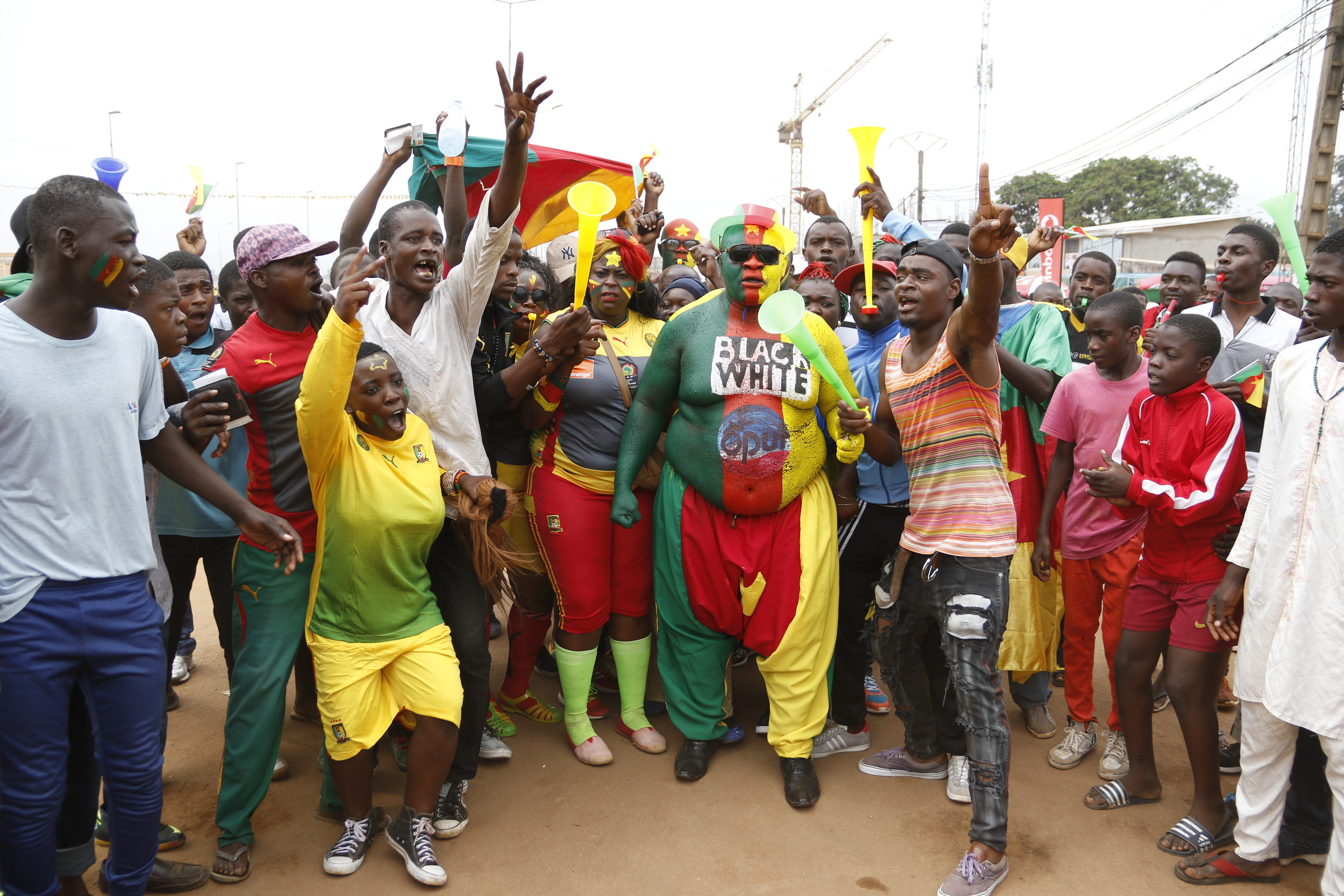

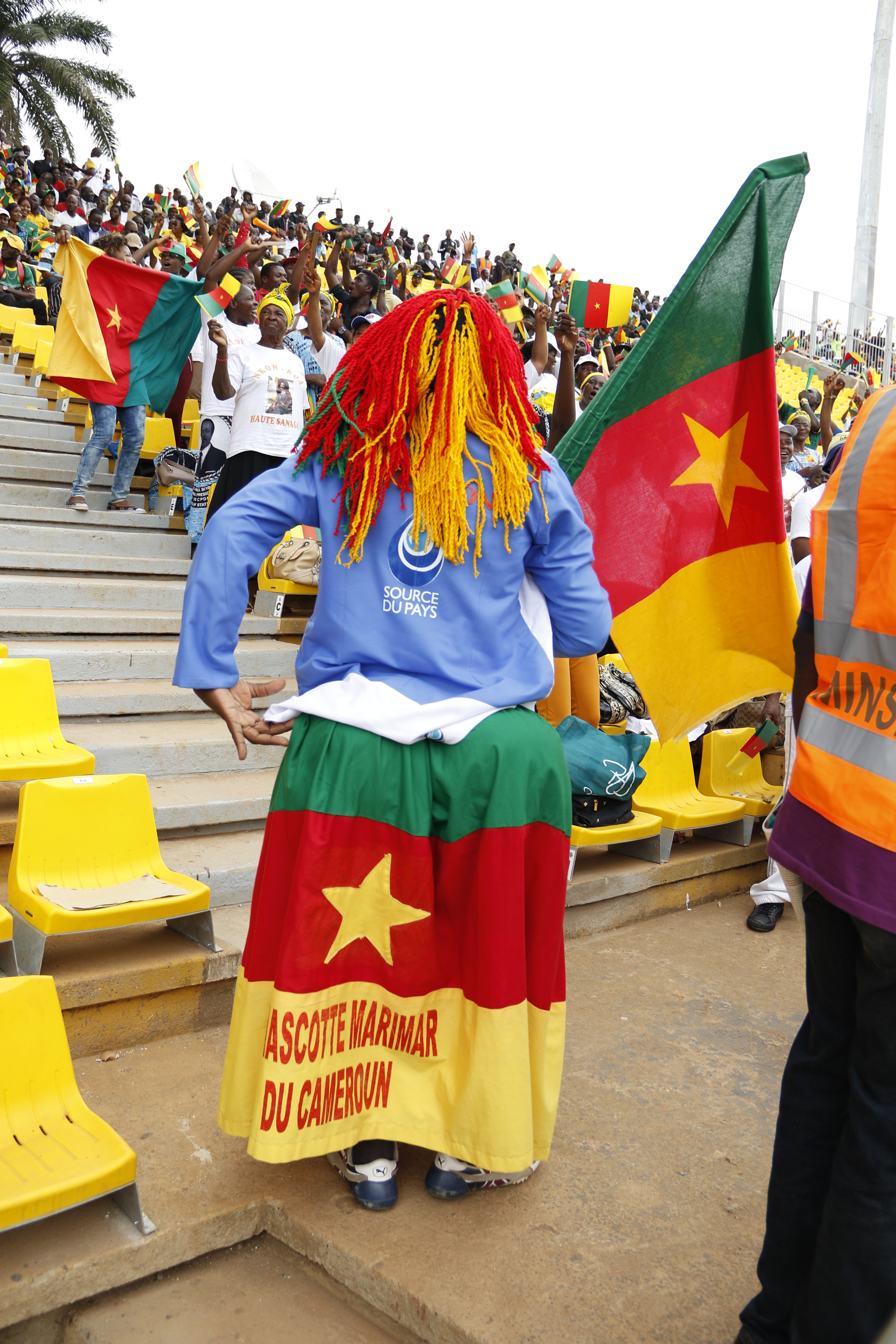

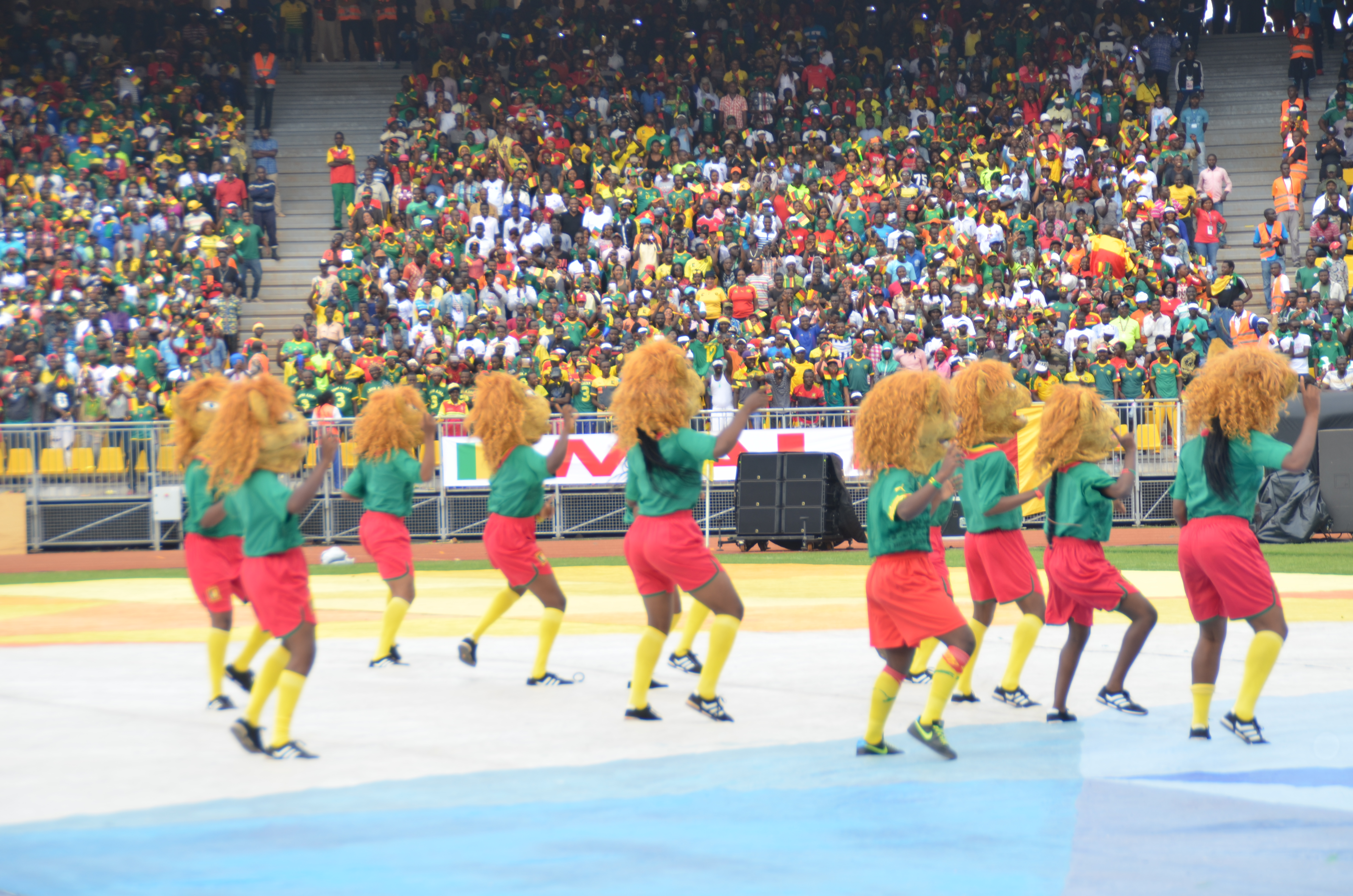

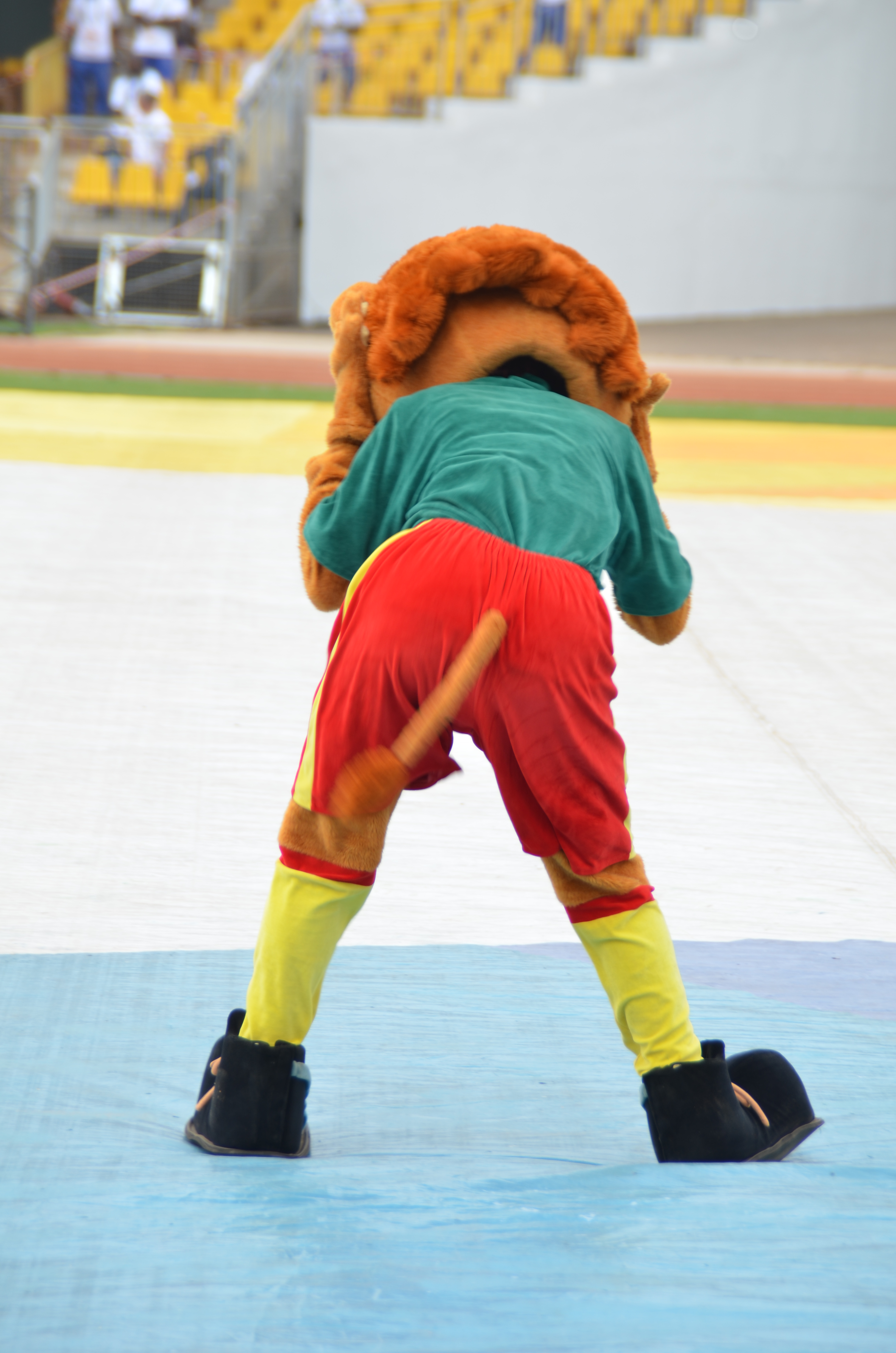

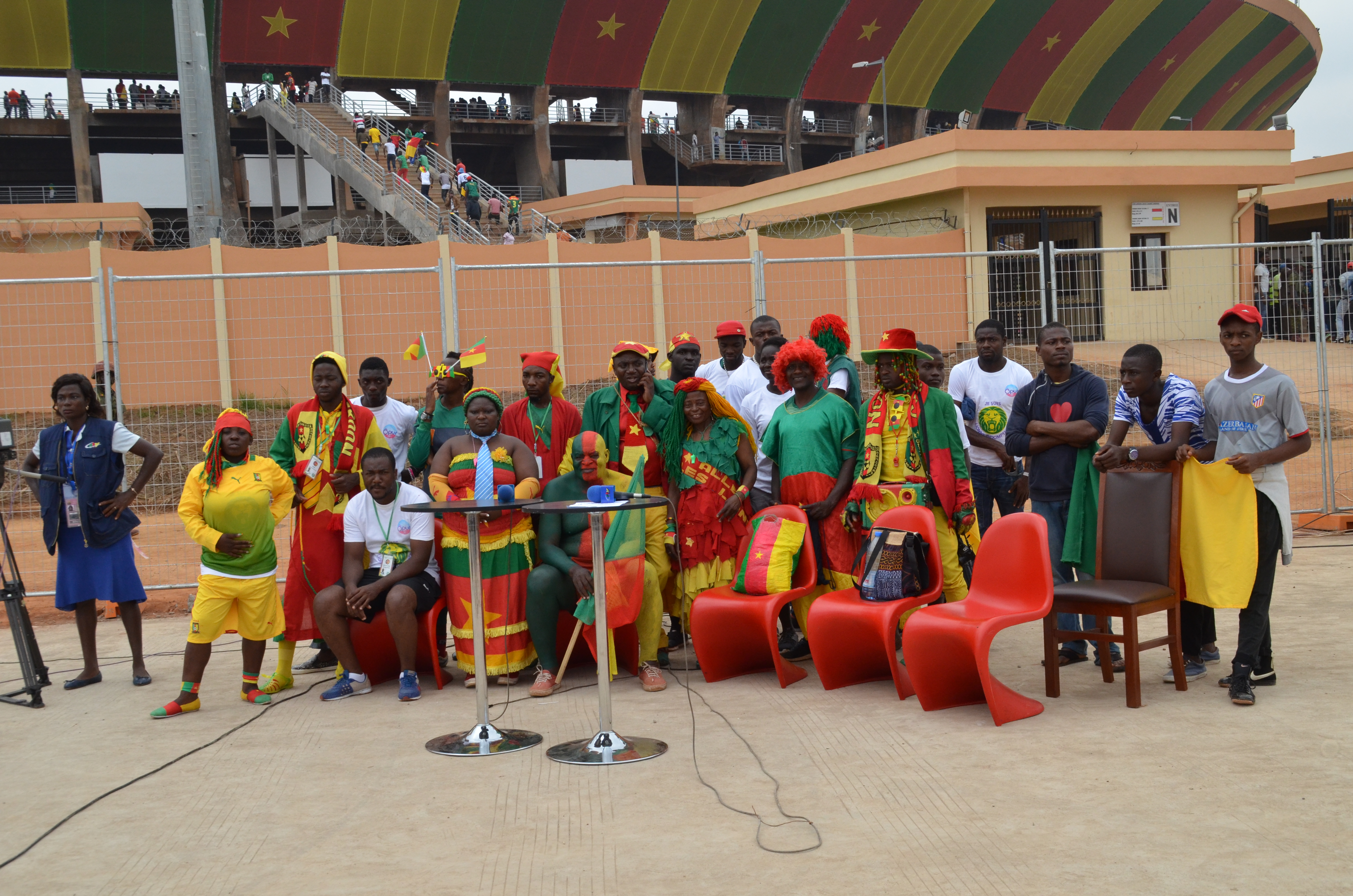

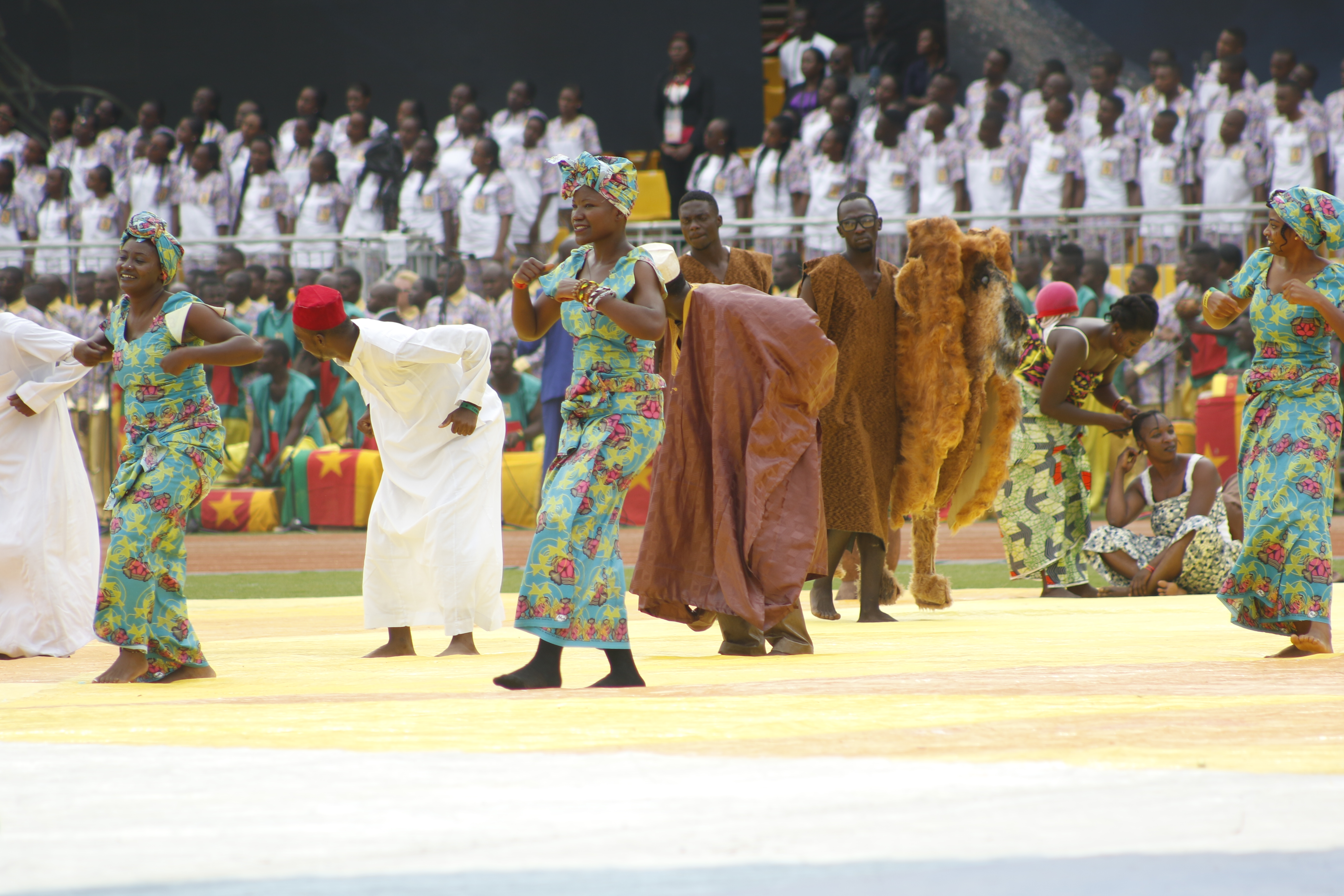

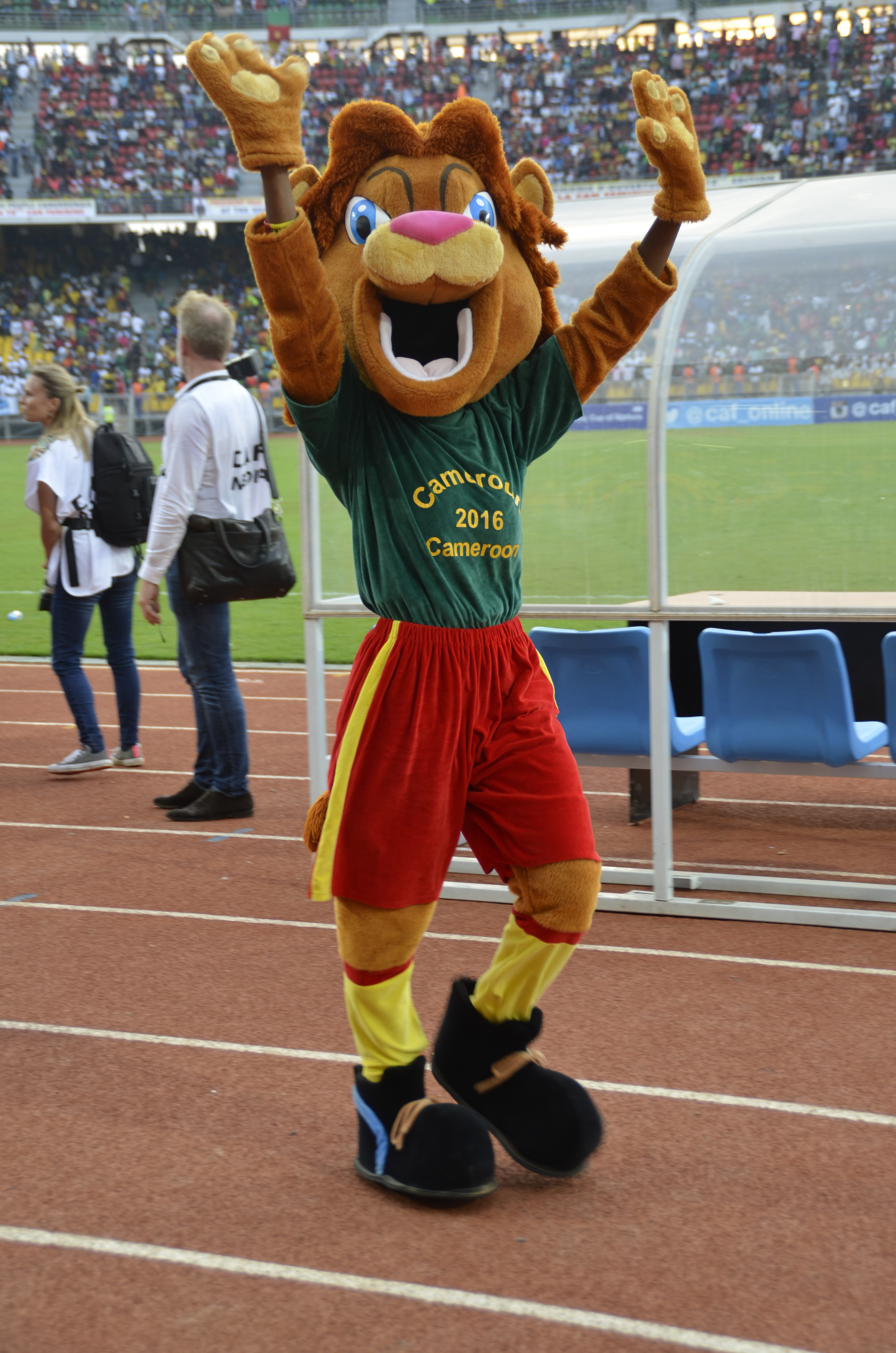
