= Niger women's national football team results =

The Niger women's national football team is the representative women's association football team of Niger. Its governing body is the Nigerien Football Federation (FENIFOOT) and it competes as a member of the Confederation of African Football (CAF).

The national team's first activity was in 2007, when they competed at the Tournoi de Cinq Nations held in Ouagadougou. On 2 September, they lost to Burkina Faso 0–10. Niger is currently ranked 164th in the FIFA Women's World Rankings.

== Record per opponent ==
Key

Positive balance (more wins than losses)
Neutral balance (as many wins as losses)
Negative balance (more losses than wins)

The following table shows Niger' all-time official international record per opponent:

Opponent	Pld	W	D	L	GF	GA	GD	W%	Confederation
Burkina Faso	4	0	0	4	1	25	−24	0.00	CAF
Ghana	1	0	0	1	0	9	−9	0.00	CAF
Ivory Coast	3	0	0	3	0	27	−27	0.00	CAF
Mali	1	0	0	1	0	12	−12	0.00	CAF
Nigeria	1	0	0	1	0	15	−15	0.00	CAF
Tunisia	2	0	0	2	1	12	−11	0.00	CAF
Total	12	0	0	12	2	100	−98	00.00	—

== Results ==
=== 2007 ===
2 September 2007 2007 Tournoi de Cinq Nations	Burkina Faso	10–0	Niger	Ouagadougou, Burkina Faso
--:-- UTC+0	Simporé 10', 11', 27', 49', 57'; Tou 22'; Sana 37', 47'; Rabo 78'; Damiba 90'	Report

6 September 2007 2007 Tournoi de Cinq Nations	Niger	0–5	Burkina Faso	Ouagadougou, Burkina Faso
--:-- UTC+0		Report

8 September 2007 2007 Tournoi de Cinq Nations 3rd place	Ivory Coast	Cancelled	Niger	Ouagadougou, Burkina Faso
--:-- UTC+0

=== 2018 ===
14 February 2018 2018 WAFU Zone B Women's Cup Group A	Burkina Faso	5–1	Niger	Abidjan, Ivory Coast
19:00 UTC+0	Simporé 8'; Nana 13'; Al Hassana 20' (o.g.); Nikiéma 65'; Millogo 74'	Report	(??)	Stadium: Stade Robert Champroux

16 February 2018 2018 WAFU Zone B Women's Cup Group A	Ghana	9–0	Niger	Abidjan, Ivory Coast
17:30 UTC+0	Boakye 2', 52'; Egyir 31', 57'; Asantewaa 35'; Okyere 45' (pen.); Appiah 45+2'; Ayieyam 55', 70'	Report		Stadium: Stade Robert Champroux

18 February 2018 2018 WAFU Zone B Women's Cup Group A	Ivory Coast	7–0	Niger	Abidjan, Ivory Coast
18:00 UTC+0	Kpaho 12'; Lohoues 15'; Aby 58'; Nrehy 59', 65', 90'; Essoh 67'	Report		Stadium: Parc des Sports de Treichville

=== 2019 ===
9 May 2019 2019 WAFU Zone B Women's Cup Group B	Mali	12–0	Niger	Abidjan, Ivory Coast
--:-- UTC+0	Touré 13', 25', 65', 79'; B. Diarra 16'; S. Diarra 47', 54'; Doumbia 50', 59', 73'; A. Diarra 68'; Tata 83'	Report		Stadium: Parc des Sports de Treichville; Referee: Sonia Zomadré (Ivory Coast)

11 May 2019 2019 WAFU Zone B Women's Cup Group B	Nigeria	15–0	Niger	Abidjan, Ivory Coast
--:-- UTC+0	Aku 9', 27'; Kanu 11', 37' (?); Sule 23', 55'; Ogbonna (?); Ogebe 65'; Nunumwen 69'; Wogu 74'; Okeke 85'; Bokiri (?)	Report		Stadium: Parc des Sports de Treichville

14 May 2019 2019 WAFU Zone B Women's Cup Group B	Burkina Faso	5–0	Niger	Abidjan, Ivory Coast
--:-- UTC+0	Sawadogo 9' (pen.), 32'; Fatoumata 36', 46'; Ilboudo 57'	Report		Stadium: Parc des Sports de Treichville

=== 2020 ===
April 2020 2020 AFWCON qualification First round 1st leg	Togo	Cancelled	Niger	Togo
--:-- UTC+0

April 2020 2020 AFWCON qualification First round 2nd leg	Niger	Cancelled	Togo	Niger
--:-- UTC+0

=== 2021 ===
20 October 2021 2022 AFWCON qualification First round 1st leg	Niger	0–9	Ivory Coast	Niamey, Niger
		Report	Guehai (?); N'Guessan (?); Elloh (?); Diakité (?); Nrehy (?); Kouassi (?)	Stadium: Stade Général Seyni Kountché; Referee: Aurore Ligan (Benin)

25 October 2021 2022 AFWCON qualification First round 2nd leg	Ivory Coast	11–0 (20–0 agg.)	Niger	Abidjan, Ivory Coast
	Nrehy 1'; Coulibaly 19', 67'; Kakounan 30'; Guehai 35'; Kouassi 44', 79', 85'; Aby 53'; Elloh 62'; Konan 80'	Report		Stadium: Stade Robert Champroux
Note: Ivory Coast won 20–0 on aggregate.

=== 2023 ===
22 September 2023 2024 AFWCON qualification First round 1st leg	Tunisia	7–0	Niger	Soliman, Tunisia
16:00 UTC+1	Houij 14', 58'; Klai 43'; Ellouzi 67', 80', 90+2'; Hamdi 73'	Report (FTF)		Stadium: Stade municipal de Soliman

26 September 2023 2024 AFWCON qualification First round 2nd leg	Niger	1–5 (1–12 agg.)	Tunisia	Soliman, Tunisia
15:30 UTC+1	Hamed 90' (pen.)	Report (FTF)	Ellouzi 9', 49'; Mamay 15'; Houij 45+1' (pen.); Zemzem 77'	Stadium: Stade municipal de Soliman
Note: Tunisia won 12–1 on aggregate.

== See also ==
- Niger national football team results
