= Burkina Faso women's national football team results =

The Burkina Faso women's national football team is the representative women's association football team of Burkina Faso. Its governing body is the Burkinabé Football Federation (FBF) and it competes as a member of the Confederation of African Football (CAF).

The national team's first activity was in 2007, when they competed at the Tournoi de Cinq Nations held in Ouagadougou. On 2 September, Burkina Faso played their first match against Niger winning both games, Burkina Faso Made it to the final in their debut year and lost to Mali in the final. Burkina Faso is currently ranked 140th in the FIFA Women's World Rankings.

== Record per opponent ==
Key

Positive balance (more wins than losses)
Neutral balance (as many wins as losses)
Negative balance (more losses than wins)

The following table shows Burkina Faso' all-time official international record per opponent:

Opponent	Pld	W	D	L	GF	GA	GD	W%	Confederation
Benin	4	4	0	0	15	4	+11	100.00	CAF
Gambia	2	1	0	1	3	3	0	50.00	CAF
Ghana	3	0	0	3	1	10	-9	00.00	CAF
Guinea-Bissau	2	2	0	0	7	0	+7	100.00	CAF
Ivory Coast	1	0	1	0	1	1	0	00.00	CAF
Mali	3	0	0	3	5	12	-7	00.00	CAF
Morocco	4	0	1	3	2	6	-4	00.00	CAF
Niger	4	4	0	0	25	1	+24	100.00	CAF
Nigeria	1	0	0	1	1	5	-4	00.00	CAF
Senegal	1	0	0	1	0	1	-1	00.00	CAF
South Africa	1	0	0	1	0	4	-4	00.00	CAF
Tunisia	2	0	1	1	0	2	-2	00.00	CAF
Uganda	1	0	1	0	2	2	0	00.00	CAF
Total	29	11	4	14	62	51	+11	37.93	—

== Results ==
=== 2007 ===
2 September 2007 2007 Tournoi de Cinq Nations	Burkina Faso	10–0	Niger	Ouagadougou, Burkina Faso
--:-- UTC+0	Simporé 10', 11', 27', 49', 57'; Tou 22'; Sana 37', 47'; Rabo 78'; Damiba 90'	Report

6 September 2007 2007 Tournoi de Cinq Nations	Niger	0–5	Burkina Faso	Ouagadougou, Burkina Faso
--:-- UTC+0		Report

9 September 2007 2007 Tournoi de Cinq Nations Final	Mali	4–2	Burkina Faso	Ouagadougou, Burkina Faso
--:-- UTC+0	Samaké 15'; Doumbia 25' (pen.); Coulibaly 31'; Diarra 52'	Report	Sana 54'; Simporé 90'

=== 2014 ===
16 February 2014 2014 AFWCON qualification First round 1st leg	Burkina Faso	0–3	Ghana	Ouagadougou, Burkina Faso
17:00 UTC+0		Report	Ibrahim 4', 19'; Aduako 9'	Stadium: Stade du 4 Août; Referee: Sara Mohamed Ramadan (Egypt)

1 March 2014 2014 AFWCON qualification First round 2nd leg	Ghana	3–0 (6–0 agg.)	Burkina Faso	Accra, Ghana
15:00 UTC+0	Ibrahim 20'; Aduako 26' (pen.), 72'	Report		Stadium: Accra Sports Stadium; Referee: Ajayi Foluso Adewuyi (Nigeria)
Note: Ghana won 6–0 on aggregate.

=== 2016 ===
12 January 2016 Friendly	Mali	5–2	Burkina Faso	Bamako, Mali

5 March 2016 2016 AFWCON qualification First round 1st leg	Burkina Faso	0–0	Tunisia	Ouagadougou, Burkina Faso
--:-- UTC+0		Report		Stadium: Stade du 4 Août; Referee: Kankou Coulibaly (Mali)

19 March 2016 2016 AFWCON qualification First round 2nd leg	Tunisia	2–0 (2–0 agg.)	Burkina Faso	Oued Ellil, Tunisia
--:-- UTC+1	Mamay 52'; Mchara 89'	Report		Stadium: Stade de Oued Ellil; Referee: Khadmallah Elsayed Angato Koko (Sudan)
Note: Tunisia won 2–0 on aggregate.

=== 2017 ===
10 July 2017 Friendly	Morocco	1–1	Burkina Faso	Salé, Morocco

22 October 2017 Friendly	South Africa	4–0	Burkina Faso	Soweto, South Africa
15:00 UTC+2		Report		Stadium: Dobsonville Stadium

27 December 2017 Friendly	Burkina Faso	1–2	Morocco	Ouagadougou, Burkina Faso
15:30 UTC+0		Report		Stadium: FBF Technical Centre

29 December 2017 Friendly	Burkina Faso	0–2	Morocco	Ouagadougou, Burkina Faso
15:30 UTC+0				Stadium: Stade Dr. Issoufou Joseph Conombo

=== 2018 ===
14 February 2018 2018 WAFU Zone B Women's Cup Group A	Burkina Faso	5–1	Niger	Abidjan, Ivory Coast
19:00 UTC+0	Simporé 8'; Nana 13'; Al Hassana 20' (o.g.); Nikiéma 65'; Millogo 74'	Report	??' (o.g.)	Stadium: Stade Robert Champroux

16 February 2018 2018 WAFU Zone B Women's Cup Group A	Ivory Coast	1–1	Burkina Faso	Abidjan, Ivory Coast
21:00 UTC+0	Gauzé 51'	Report	Simporé 89' (pen.)	Stadium: Stade Robert Champroux

18 February 2018 2018 WAFU Zone B Women's Cup Group A	Ghana	4–1	Burkina Faso	Abidjan, Ivory Coast
21:00 UTC+0	Boakye 21', 70'; Asantewaa 39'; Okyere 55'	Report	?'	Stadium: Stade Robert Champroux

7 April 2018 2018 AFWCON qualification First round 1st leg	Burkina Faso	2–1	Gambia	Ouagadougou, Burkina Faso
16:30 UTC+0	Simporé 27', 80'	Report	Tamba 23'	Stadium: Stade du 4 Août; Referee: Fatou Thioune (Senegal)

10 April 2018 2018 AFWCON qualification First round 2nd leg	Gambia	2–1 (3–3 agg.)	Burkina Faso	Bakau, Gambia
16:30 UTC+0	Tamba 19'; Kouanda 20' (o.g.)	Report	Simporé 53'	Stadium: Independence Stadium; Referee: Bouchra Karboubi (Morocco)
Note: 3–3 on aggregate. Gambia won 5–3 on penalties.

=== 2019 ===
9 May 2019 2019 WAFU Zone B Women's Cup Group B	Nigeria	5–1	Burkina Faso	Abidjan, Ivory Coast
16:30 UTC+0	Kanu 12', ?', ?'; Nwabuoku 19'; Okoronkwo 22'	Report	Millogo	Stadium: Parc des Sports de Treichville

11 May 2019 2019 WAFU Zone B Women's Cup Group B	Mali	3–1	Burkina Faso	Abidjan, Ivory Coast
18:30 UTC+0	Sogore 15'		Sawadogo 45+1'	Stadium: Parc des Sports de Treichville; Referee: Juliet Appiah (Ghana)

14 May 2019 2019 WAFU Zone B Women's Cup Group B	Burkina Faso	5–0	Niger	Abidjan, Ivory Coast
16:00 UTC+0	Sawadogo 9' (pen.); Fatoumata 36', 46'; Ilboudo 57'	Report		Stadium: Parc des Sports de Treichville

17 December 2019 Friendly	Burkina Faso	6–2	Benin	Ouagadougou, Burkina Faso

19 December 2019 Friendly	Burkina Faso	4–0	Benin	Ouagadougou, Burkina Faso

=== 2021 ===
20 October 2022 AFWCON qualification First round 1st leg	Burkina Faso	2–1	Benin	Abidjan, Ivory Coast
<!- – 20:00 CEST (UTC+2) -->		Report		Stadium: Stade National de la Côte d'Ivoire

24 October 2022 AFWCON qualification First round 2nd leg	Benin	1–3 (2–5 agg.)	Burkina Faso	Cotonou, Benin
<!- – 20:00 CEST (UTC+2) -->	Abamon 90+1'	Report	Zato 39', 90+2'; Sawadogo 50'	Stadium: Stade de l'Amitié
Note: Burkina Faso won 5–2 on aggregate.

=== 2022 ===
16 February 2022 AFWCON qualification Second round 1st leg	Guinea-Bissau	0–6	Burkina Faso	Bissau, Guinea-Bissau
		Report	Nana ?', ?'; Kabré ?'; Congo ?'; Rouamba ?'; Nikiéma ?'	Stadium: Estádio 24 de Setembro; Referee: Zomadre Sonia Lire (Ivory Coast)

23 February 2022 AFWCON qualification Second round 2nd leg	Burkina Faso	1–0 (7–0 agg.)	Guinea-Bissau	Porto-Novo (Benin)
	Nana 11'	Report		Stadium: Stade Charles de Gaulle; Referee: Patience Madu (Nigeria)
Note: Burkina Faso won 7–0 on aggregate.

2 July 2022 2022 AFWCON GS	Morocco	1–0	Burkina Faso	Rabat, Morocco
21:30	Chebbak 29'			Stadium: Prince Moulay Abdellah Stadium; Referee: Salima Mukansanga (Rwanda)

5 July 2022 2022 AFWCON GS	Burkina Faso	0–1	Senegal	Rabat, Morocco
18:00			Fall 84' (pen.)	Stadium: Prince Moulay Abdellah Stadium; Referee: Suavis Iratunga (Burundi)

8 July 2022 2022 AFWCON GS	Burkina Faso	2–2	Uganda	Casablanca, Morocco
21:00	Congo 35'; Kabré 41'		Kunihira 8'; Nabweteme 38'	Stadium: Stade Mohammed V Referee: Patience Madu (Nigeria)

=== 2023 ===
9 July 2023 Friendly	Benin	1–4	Burkina Faso	Cotonou, Benin
15:30 UTC+1		Report	O. Konaté 16'; Kabre 19'; Tamboura 36'; Sedogo 57'	Stadium: Stade de l'Amitié

12 July 2023 2024 Olympic qualifying	Burkina Faso	0–1	Mali	Cotonou, Benin
15:30 UTC+1		Report	A. Diarra 11'	Stadium: Stade de l'Amitié

18 July 2023 2024 Olympic qualifying	Mali	2–2 (a.e.t.) (4–3 agg.)	Burkina Faso	Bamako, Mali
--:-- UTC+0	Traoré 29'; Sogoré 100'		Sawadogo 11', 52'	Stadium: Stade du 26 Mars
Note: Mali won 4–3 on aggregate.

20 September 2023 2024 AFWCON qualification First round 1st leg	Eswatini	2–3	Burkina Faso	Lobamba, Eswatini
15:00 UTC+2	Simelane 47'; Ngcamphalala 90+1'	Report (EFA)	Belem 16'; R. Sawadogo 20'; Compaore 32'	Stadium: Somhlolo National Stadium

26 September 2023 2024 AFWCON qualification First round 2nd leg	Burkina Faso	3–0 (6–2 agg.)	Eswatini	Bouaké, Ivory Coast
16:00 UTC+0	Kabré 8', 19'; Zongo 61'			Stadium: Stade de la Paix
Note: Burkina Faso won 6–2 on aggregate.

30 November 2023 2024 AFWCON qualification Second round 1st leg	Burkina Faso	1–1	South Africa	Yamoussoukro, Ivory Coast
17:00 UTC+1	Konaté 68'	Report (SAFA)	Magaia 60'	Stadium: Charles Konan Banny Stadium

4 December 2023 2024 AFWCON qualification Second round 2nd leg	South Africa	2–0 (3–1 agg.)	Burkina Faso	Pretoria, South Africa
15:00 UTC+1	Motlhalo 56' (pen.); Michael 86'	Report (SAFA)		Stadium: Lucas Moripe Stadium; Attendance: x
Note: South Africa won 3–1 on aggregate.

=== 2024 ===
24 February 2024 Friendly	Algeria	2–0	Burkina Faso	Algiers, Algeria
16:00 UTC+1	Battouri 32'; Bouhenni 62'	Report (FAF)		Stadium: Centre technique national de Sidi Moussa

27 February 2024 Friendly	Algeria	3–0	Burkina Faso	Algiers, Algeria
16:00 UTC+1	Boussaha 12'; Dafeur 58'; Guellati 64'	Report (FAF)		Stadium: Nelson Mandela Stadium

14 December 2024 Friendly	Niger	1–3	Burkina Faso	Niamey, Niger
15:00 UTC+1	Moussa 76'	Report	Congo 73'; Zongo 82'; Guira 86'	Stadium: FENIFOOT Technical Center; Referee: Edoh Kendedji (Togo)

16 December 2024 Friendly	Niger	0–3	Burkina Faso	Niamey, Niger
15:00 UTC+1			Kabré 40'; Zongo 54', 90'	Stadium: FENIFOOT Technical Center

=== 2025 ===
21 February 2025 2026 WAFCON qualifying	Burundi	0–1	Burkina Faso	Bamako, Mali
16:00 UTC+0		Report	M. Traoré 24'	Stadium: Stade Mamadou Konaté; Referee: Bouchra Karboubi (Morocco)

26 February 2025 2026 WAFCON qualifying	Burkina Faso	4–1 (5–1 agg.)	Burundi	Bamako, Mali
16:00 UTC+0	Kabré 19', 44', 90'; Millogo 63'	Report	Habonimana 84'	Stadium: Stade du 26 Mars
Note: Burkina Faso won 5–1 on aggregate.

24 October 2025 2026 WAFCON qualifying	Burkina Faso	2–0	Togo	Ouagadougou
16:00 UTC+0	R. Sawadogo 65' (pen.); Kabré 89' (pen.)	Report (FIFA)		Stadium: Stade du 4 Août; Referee: Mariétou Fall (Senegal)

28 October 2025 2026 WAFCON qualifying	Togo	0–1	Burkina Faso	Lomé
16:00 UTC+0		Report (FIFA)	Congo 45+4'	Stadium: Stade de Kégué; Referee: Zakia El Grini (Morocco)
Note: Burkina Faso won 3–0 on aggregate.

== See also ==
- Burkina Faso national football team results
