= Mukarama Abdulai =

Ghanaian footballer (born 2002)

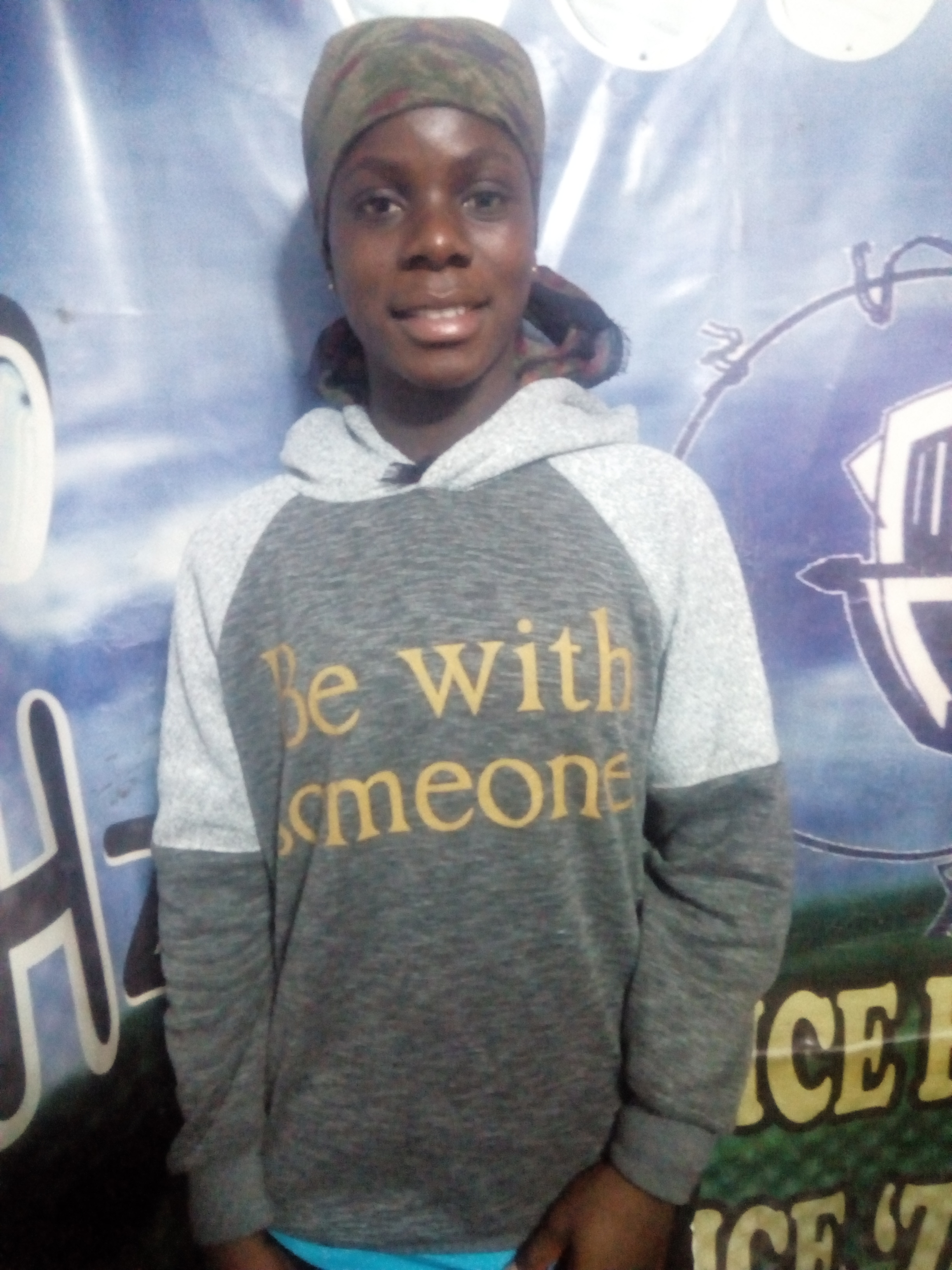
- Abdulai in 2018

Personal information
- Date of birth: 10 October 2002 (age 24)
- Place of birth: Tamale, Ghana
- Height: 1.73 m (5 ft 8 in)
- Position: Forward

Team information
- Current team: Ünye
- Number: 18

Youth career
- 2011–2019: Northern Ladies

College career
Years	Team	Apps	(Gls)
2019	UDS	-	(-)
2019–2021	Tyler Apaches	39	(50)

Senior career*
Years	Team	Apps	(Gls)
2019–2021	Northern Ladies		
2021–2023	Alavés	5	(0)
2023 - 2026	Hassacas Ladies	19	(14)
2026-	Ünye	4	(1)

International career
2017–2018	Ghana U17	8	(19)
2019	Ghana U20	2	(2)
2019–	Ghana		
- * Club domestic league appearances and goals as of 14 November 2026

Mukarama Abdulai (born 16 October 2002) is a Ghanaian professional footballer who plays as a striker for Ünye, the Black Maidens and the Ghana women's national team.

== College career ==
=== University for Development Studies ===
In late 2018, Mukarama gained admission into the University for Development Studies (UDS) and joined the school's football team. During the 8th edition of the Ghana University Sports Association (GUSA) mini games in 2019, she led the team to win the female football tournament, scored three goals and won the top scorer and the best player of the tournament accolade.

=== Tyler Junior College ===
In August 2019, she got a scholarship to study at the Tyler Junior College in Texas, USA, whilst pursuing her football career.

During her debut season for the Tyler Junior College women's soccer team, she scored 27 goals and made 13 assists to help the team win the 2019 NJCAA Gulf South District Championship and the NJCAA Women's Soccer Championship, including a brace in the final. After recording three consecutive braces to close out the tournament, she was selected as the Most Valuable Offensive Player of the competition.

In her second season, she scored 23 goals and made 10 assists to help the team win the 2020 NJCAA Gulf South District Championship and the NJCAA Women's Soccer Championship for the second consecutive year. In the finals, she scored a brace as Tyler College beat Salt Lake (Utah) 2–0 in the final match of the season to complete the campaign with an 18–0 record. She ended the championship as the top scorer, points leader and was also adjudged the Most Valuable Player.

== Club career ==
Mukarama joined Ghana Premier League side Northern Ladies FC in 2011 at the age of 9. During the 2020–21 season, on match day 1, she scored a hat-trick in their 3–1 win over Ashtown Ladies on 17 January 2021. She scored two goals in the first half and one in the second half to seal the first win for the club.

On 16 July 2021, Alavés, announced that they had signed Mukarama on a two-year deal and she was set to stay with the club until 2023. In January 2023, Mukarama and Alavés announced that she had mutually terminated her contract with the club. In September 2023, Ghanaian side, Hasaacas Ladies announced the signing of Abdulai on a two-years deal.

In August 2026, she moved to Turkey, and signed wit the Turkish Women's Super League club Ünye.

== International career ==
She captained Ghana's squad during the 2018 FIFA U-17 Women's World Cup in Uruguay, where she won the Golden Boot for her tournament-best seven goals and two assists. She scored a hat-trick in the first match against the host country. In addition, she won the Bronze Ball. After her exploits with the team, she was adjudged the Women's footballer of the Year for 2018 by SWAG, beating Grace Asantewaa and Faustina Ampah to the award.

Abdulai was called up to the senior team ahead of the 2019 WAFU Zone B Women's Cup. She made her debut during the first match of the tournament against Senegal and scored a goal to help Ghana seal a 2–0 victory.

She was named on Ghana U20 side and made captain ahead of a double friendly match against Morocco in November 2020. She made her debut in the first match on 23 November 2020 with Ghana suffering a 1–0 defeat, however in the second match on 30 November, she scored a brace to help Ghana win by 4–0.

In March 2024, Abdulai helped Ghana to secure Gold at the All African Games, scoring in the depth of extra time in a 2–1 victory over Nigeria in the final of women football.

=== International goals ===
No.	Date	Venue	Opponent	Score	Result	Competition
1.	8 May 2019	Stade Robert Champroux, Abidjan, Ivory Coast	Senegal	2–0	2–0	2019 WAFU Zone B Women's Cup
2.	10 May 2019	Treichville Sports Park, Treichville, Ivory Coast	Togo	1–0	6–0	2019 WAFU Zone B Women's Cup
3.	13 October 2026	Accra Sports Stadium, Accra, Ghana	Mauritius	4–0	7–0	2028 CAF Women's Olympic qualifying tournament
4.	13 October 2026	Accra Sports Stadium, Accra, Ghana	Mauritius	7–0	7–0	2028 CAF Women's Olympic qualifying tournament

== Honours ==
Ghana

- WAFU Zone B Women's Cup Third place : 2019

=== Individual ===
- FIFA Under 17 Women's World Cup Golden Shoe: 2018
- FIFA Under 17 Women's World Cup Bronze Ball: 2018
- SWAG Women's Footballer of the Year: 2018
- Ghana Football Awards Women's Footballer of the Year: 2019
- Ghana Football Awards Rising Star Award: 2019

== See also ==
- List of Ghana women's international footballers
