= Janet Egyir =

Ghanaian footballer

Personal information
- Date of birth: 7 May 1992 (age 34)
- Place of birth: Sekondi-Takoradi, Ghana
- Height: 1.62 m (5 ft 4 in)
- Position: Defender

Team information
- Current team: Hapoel Katamon Jerusalem

Senior career*
Years	Team	Apps	(Gls)
2010–2016	Hasaacas Ladies	86	(16)
2016–2017	Víkingur Ólafsvík	32	(0)
2018	Afturelding/Fram	18	(3)
2019	Hasaacas Ladies		
2019	Afturelding	12	(3)
2020–2022	Hasaacas Ladies		
2022–2025	Hapoel Katamon Jerusalem	67	(3)

International career^{‡}
- Ghana
- * Club domestic league appearances and goals as of 5 July 2025 ‡ National team caps and goals as of 11 October 2014 (before the 2014 African Women's Championship)

Janet Egyir (born 7 May 1992) is a Ghanaian footballer who plays as a defender for Israeli Women's Premier League club Hapoel Katamon Jerusalem FC and the Ghana women's national team. She was part of the team at the 2014 African Women's Championship. In 2018, she was adjudged the best player of the tournament at the 2018 WAFU Women's Cup. She was born in Sekondi-Takoradi.

== International goals ==
No.	Date	Venue	Opponent	Score	Result	Competition
1.	16 February 2018	Stade Robert Champroux, Abidjan, Ivory Coast	Niger	2–0	9–0	2018 WAFU Zone B Women's Cup
2.	16 February 2018	Stade Robert Champroux, Abidjan, Ivory Coast	Niger	8–0	9–0	2018 WAFU Zone B Women's Cup
3.	24 February 2018	Treichville Sports Park, Abidjan, Ivory Coast	Ivory Coast	1–0	1–0	2018 WAFU Zone B Women's Cup

== Club career ==
=== Víkingur Ólafsvík 2016 ===
In May 2016 she signed for Víkingur Ólafsvík in Iceland.

=== Hapoel Katamon Jerusalem (Israel) ===
In July 2022 she signed for Hapoel Katamon Jerusalem's women's team. On the team's first ever season in the top league, she helped the club finish 2nd, and was nominated for the Defensive player of the year award.

She continued with the club for two additional seasons, finishig 2nd in the league on each season, while on 2023/24 winning the Israeli league cup, and on 2024/25 finishing as runners up in both the league cup and the Israeli Cup.

== Honours ==
- WAFU Women's Cup player of the tournament : 2018
