= 2020 Women's Africa Cup of Nations qualification =

Cancelled qualification for cancelled 2020 WAFCON

Tournament details
- Dates: Cancelled (originally 6 April – 9 June 2020)
- Teams: 36

Qualification for the 2020 Women's Africa Cup of Nations was scheduled to run from 6 April to 9 June 2020 with 12 teams, including the host nation team, participating in the group stages for the first time in the tournament. However, the Confederation of African Football (CAF) decided to cancel this edition due to the COVID-19 pandemic in Africa and rather launch the CAF Women's Champions League, which began the following year, i.e. 2021.

== Format ==
Qualification ties were to be played on a home-and-away two-legged basis. If the aggregate score was tied after the second leg, the away goals rule would be applied, even to the extent of a penalty shoot-out, with extra time skipped, to determine the winner.

== Schedule ==
The first round of matches was originally scheduled for 8 – 14 April 2020, but CAF announced its postponement until further notice on 13 March 2020 at the onset of the spread of the COVID-19 pandemic in Africa.

The second round of matches were originally scheduled for 1 – 9 June 2020, but on 3 April 2020, FIFA had recommended that all international matches scheduled for June that year be postponed. With qualification not held, CAF announced the cancellation of this edition of the tournament on 30 June 2020, making history in the process as the first African continent-centric football event or competition that was cancelled or not held for global health reasons.

== Draw ==
A then-record of 36 (out of 54) CAF member national teams entered qualification, whose draw was held on 4 December 2019 at the CAF headquarters in Cairo, Egypt. The draw procedures were as follows:

- In the first round, the 28 teams were drawn into 14 ties, with teams divided into four pots based on their geographical zones and those in the same pot drawn to play against each other.
- In the second round, the 14 preliminary round winners and the eight teams receiving byes to the second round were allocated into 11 ties based on the first round tie numbers, with eight first round winners playing against the eight teams receiving byes, and the other six first round winners playing against each other.

| Bye to second round (8 teams) | First round entrants (28 teams) | | | | |
| Bye to second round (8 teams) | Pot A (8 from COSAFA) | Pot B (1 from COSAFA + 5 from UNIFFAC) | Pot C (6 from CECAFA) | Pot D (4 from WAFU A) | Pot E (3 from WAFU B + 1 from UNAF) |
|---|---|---|---|---|---|
| Cameroon; Equatorial Guinea; Ghana; Ivory Coast; Mali; Morocco; Nigeria; South Africa | Botswana; Eswatini; Malawi; Mauritius; Mozambique; Namibia; Zambia; Zimbabwe | Angola; Central African Republic; Congo; DR Congo; Gabon; São Tomé and Príncipe | Burundi; Djibouti; Ethiopia; Kenya; Tanzania; Uganda | Gambia; Guinea-Bissau; Liberia; Senegal | Burkina Faso; Niger; Togo; Algeria |

Notes

- Teams in **bold** qualified for the group stages.
- (W): Withdrew after draw

Did not enter

- Benin
- Cape Verde
- Chad
- Comoros
- Egypt
- Eritrea
- Guinea
- Lesotho
- Libya
- Madagascar
- Mauritania
- Rwanda
- Seychelles
- Sierra Leone
- Somalia
- South Sudan
- Sudan
- Tunisia

== Bracket ==
The 11 winners of the second round would have qualified for the main phase of the 2020 Women's Africa Cup of Nations.

First round
1 | Zambia
4 | Mozambique
3 | Zimbabwe
2 | Mauritius

Second round
Winner 1
Winner 2

| First round | | Second round |
| 1 | Malawi |
| 4 | Eswatini |
| 4 | Eswatini | Winner 3 |
| | | South Africa |

First round
1 | Namibia
4 | Botswana
3 | Gabon
2 | Central African Republic

Second round
Winner 4
Winner 5

| First round | | Second round |
| 1 | Angola |
| 4 | Congo |
| 4 | Congo | Winner 6 |
| | | Equatorial Guinea |

First round
1 | DR Congo
4 | São Tomé and Príncipe
3 | Tanzania
2 | Kenya

Second round
Winner 7
Winner 8

| First round | | Second round |
| 1 | Burundi |
| 4 | Uganda |
| 4 | Uganda | Winner 9 |
| | | Cameroon |

| First round | | Second round |
| 1 | Ethiopia |
| 4 | Djibouti |
| 4 | Djibouti | Winner 10 |
| | | Morocco |

| First round | | Second round |
| 1 | Liberia |
| 4 | Senegal |
| 4 | Senegal | Winner 11 |
| | | Mali |

| First round | | Second round |
| 1 | Guinea-Bissau |
| 4 | Gambia |
| 4 | Gambia | Winner 12 |
| | | Ghana |

| First round | | Second round |
| 1 | Togo |
| 4 | Niger |
| 4 | Niger | Winner 13 |
| | | Nigeria |

| First round | | Second round |
| 1 | Algeria |
| 4 | Burkina Faso |
| 4 | Burkina Faso | Winner 14 |
| | | Ivory Coast |

== First round ==
| Team 1 | Agg. | Team 2 | 1st leg | 2nd leg |
|---|---|---|---|---|
| Zambia | Match 1 | Mozambique | — | — |
| Zimbabwe | Match 2 | Mauritius | — | — |
| Malawi | Match 3 | Eswatini | — | — |
| Namibia | Match 4 | Botswana | — | — |
| Gabon | Match 5 | Central African Republic | — | — |
| Angola | Match 6 | Congo | — | — |
| DR Congo | Match 7 | São Tomé and Príncipe | — | — |
| Tanzania | Match 8 | Kenya | — | — |
| Burundi | Match 9 | Uganda | — | — |
| Ethiopia | Match 10 | Djibouti | — | — |
| Liberia | Match 11 | Senegal | — | — |
| Guinea-Bissau | Match 12 | Gambia | — | — |
| Togo | Match 13 | Niger | — | — |
| Algeria | Match 14 | Burkina Faso | — | — |

== Second round ==
Winners would have qualified for the main phase of the 2020 Women's Africa Cup of Nations.

| Team 1 | Agg. | Team 2 | 1st leg | 2nd leg |
|---|---|---|---|---|
| Winner 1 | Match 15 | Winner 2 | — | — |
| Winner 3 | Match 16 | South Africa | — | — |
| Winner 4 | Match 17 | Winner 5 | — | — |
| Winner 6 | Match 18 | Equatorial Guinea | — | — |
| Winner 7 | Match 19 | Winner 8 | — | — |
| Winner 9 | Match 20 | Cameroon | — | — |
| Winner 10 | Match 21 | Morocco | — | — |
| Winner 11 | Match 22 | Mali | — | — |
| Winner 12 | Match 23 | Ghana | — | — |
| Winner 13 | Match 24 | Nigeria | — | — |
| Winner 14 | Match 25 | Ivory Coast | — | — |
