= Jane Ayiyem =

Ghanaian footballer

Jane Ayieyam
Personal information
- Full name: Jane Ayieyam
- Date of birth: 19 October 1997 (age 29)
- Place of birth: Sandema, Ghana
- Height: 1.62 m (5 ft 4 in)
- Position: Forward

Team information
- Current team: Police F.C.
- Number: 3

Senior career*
Years	Team	Apps	(Gls)
2006–2012	Ghana Telecom Ladies	26	(19)
2013-	Police F.C.	32	(27)

International career
2012-2014	Ghana U-17	14	(11)
2016–2018	Ghana U-20	5	(3)
2018–	Ghana	8	(5)
- * Club domestic league appearances and goals as of 10 June 2019

Jane Ayiyem (born 19 October 1997) is a Ghanaian international footballer who plays as a forward for the Ghana women's national football team. She competed for Ghana at the 2018 Africa Women Cup of Nations, playing in three matches.

In 2012, 2013, and 2014 Sports Writers Association of Ghana "SWAG" Awards, Ayieyam won the best Female Footballer of the year and was also the 2012 female top scorer with 18 goals.

== International goals ==
No.	Date	Venue	Opponent	Score	Result	Competition
1.	16 February 2018	Stade Robert Champroux, Abidjan, Ivory Coast	Niger	7–0	9–0	2018 WAFU Zone B Women's Cup
2.	16 February 2018	Stade Robert Champroux, Abidjan, Ivory Coast	Niger	9–0	9–0	2018 WAFU Zone B Women's Cup
3.	1 April 2018	Transcosmos Stadium Nagasaki, Isahaya, Japan	Japan	1–1	1–7	Friendly
