= Priscilla Okyere =

Ghanaian footballer

Personal information
- Date of birth: 6 June 1995 (age 31)
- Place of birth: Techiman, Ghana
- Height: 1.57 m (5 ft 2 in)
- Position: Central midfielder

Team information
- Current team: Fatih Vatan S.K.
- Number: 14

Senior career*
| Years | Team | Apps | (Gls) |
| –2018 | Ampem Darkoa Ladies | | |
| 2018–2019 | ŽFK Spartak Subotica | | |
| 2019–2020 | Rayo Vallecano | 0 | (0) |
| 2020 | Gintra Universitetas | 0 | (0) |
| 2022–2023 | Hatayspor | 13 | (3) |
| 2023– | Fatih Vatan | 25 | (7) |

International career^{‡}
| 2016– | Ghana | 5 | (0) |
- * Club domestic league appearances and goals as of 19 December 2023 ‡ National team caps and goals as of 16 June 2019

Priscilla Okyere (born 6 June 1995) is a Ghanaian footballer, who plays as a central midfielder for Turkish club Fatih Vatan S.K. and the Ghana women's national team.

== Club career ==
She played for Fabulous Ladies F.C. before joining AMPEM DARKOA Ladies F.C

In October 2022, Okyere moved to Turkey, and signed with Hatayspor to play in the 2022–23 Sper League.

In the second half of the season, she transferred to the Istanbul-based club Fatih Vatan S.K.

== Interbayionalcareer ==
Okyere competed for Ghana at the 2018 Africa Women Cup of Nations, playing in two matches.

== International goals ==
| No. | Date | Venue | Opponent | Score | Result | Competition |
|---|---|---|---|---|---|---|
| 1. | 16 February 2018 | Stade Robert Champroux, Abidjan, Ivory Coast | Niger | 4–0 | 9–0 | 2018 WAFU Zone B Women's Cup |
| 2. | 18 February 2018 | Parc des sports de Treichville, Abidjan, Ivory Coast | Burkina Faso | 3–? | 4–1 | 2018 WAFU Zone B Women's Cup |
