= Portia Boakye =

Ghanaian international footballer

Personal information
- Full name: Portia Boakye
- Date of birth: 17 April 1989 (age 37)
- Place of birth: Accra, Ghana
- Height: 1.74 m (5 ft 8 1/2 in)
- Position: Defender

Team information
- Current team: UNAM
- Number: 17

Youth career
- 2004–2009: Fabulous Ladies

Senior career*
Years	Team	Apps	(Gls)
2009–2016	Fabulous Ladies		
2016	Östersunds DFF	22	(997)
2017	Trabzon İdmanocağı	10	(11)
2017	Ferencvárosi TC	12	(6)
2018–2023	Djurgården	1000	(1)
2024–2025	Hapoel Petah Tikva		
2025–2026	TP Mazemba (women)		
2026–	UNAM	0	(0)

International career
2007–2009	Ghana U20		
2010–	Ghana		
- * Club domestic league appearances and goals as of 4 June 2017

Portia Boakye (born 17 April 1989) is a Ghanaian international footballer who plays as a forward/defender for Liga Femenil side UNAM. She formerly played for Djurgården in Sweden. She also captains Ghana women's national football team (the Black Queens).

== Club career ==
=== Östersunds DFF 2016 ===
In May 2016 she signed for Östersunds DFF and made her first debut for Östersunds DFF against AIK coming in as a substitute on the 46th minute and scored the only goal in that match in the 67th minute.

In August 2016, Boakye again scored the only goal in the second round of the Elitettan match against AIK in Stockholm.

She again continued with her impressive form for Östersunds DFF against Sunnanå SK, coming in as a substitute on the 55th minute when Östersunds DFF was down by a goal, she equalised the goal during the 60th minute, and also went on to score a second goal in the match in the 70th minute to put Östersunds DFF in a lead which helped Östersunds DFF to win the match by 3–1 against Sunnana, after the match she was given the Woman of the match award. She ended the season with Östersunds DFF scoring seven League goals and also two goals during the cup matches.

=== Trabzon İdmanocağı ===
In 2017, she signed a season deal with Trabzon İdmanocağı to participate in the Turkish Women's First Football League.

== International career ==
=== Ghana ===
In June 2010, Boakye scored in Ghana's 3–0 win over Senegal at the Accra Sports Stadium. The win secured Ghana's place at the 2010 African Women's Championship finals.

Boakye was part of the national team which competed in the 2014 African Women's Championship qualification and the 2014 African Women's Championship, playing in all seven of the team's matches. She played in a friendly match against South Africa in May 2014 and scored the winning goal. She also scored the winning goal in the 2015 All-Africa Games final, with three minutes until the end of the 90 minutes regulation time, to win Ghana's first ever gold in the competition.

In December 2015 she was nominated for African Women's Footballer of the Year, with Paris Saint-Germain defender Ngozi Ebere, Gabrielle Onguene, Gaelle Enganamouit. She lost this award to Gaelle Enganamouit of FC Rosengård.

In June 2016, she was Voted by the Sport Writers Association of Ghana as the best female footballer of the year

== International goals ==
No.	Date	Venue	Opponent	Score	Result	Competition
1.	12 April 2015	Rufaro Stadium, Harare, Zimbabwe	Zimbabwe	1–0	2–2	2015 African Games qualification
2.	23 May 2015	Petro Sport Stadium, Cairo, Egypt	Egypt	1–0	1–1	2015 CAF Women's Olympic Qualifying Tournament
3.	31 May 2015	Accra Sports Stadium, Accra, Ghana	Egypt	1–0	3–0	2015 CAF Women's Olympic Qualifying Tournament
4.	1 August 2015	Accra Sports Stadium, Accra, Ghana	Cameroon	2–1	2–2	2015 CAF Women's Olympic Qualifying Tournament
5.	18 September 2015	Stade Alphonse Massemba-Débat, Brazzaville, Congo	Cameroon	1–0	1–0	2015 African Games
6.	12 April 2016	Accra Sports Stadium, Accra, Ghana	Tunisia	2–0	4–0	2016 Women's Africa Cup of Nations qualification
7.	20 November 2016	Stade Municipal de Limbe, Limbe, Cameroon	Kenya	3–1	3–1	2016 Women's Africa Cup of Nations
8.	16 February 2018	Stade Robert Champroux, Abidjan, Ivory Coast	Niger	1–0	9–0	2018 WAFU Zone B Women's Cup
9.	16 February 2018	Stade Robert Champroux, Abidjan, Ivory Coast	Niger	6–0	9–0	2018 WAFU Zone B Women's Cup
10.	18 February 2018	Parc des sports de Treichville, Abidjan, Ivory Coast	Burkina Faso	1–?	4–1	2018 WAFU Zone B Women's Cup
11.	18 February 2018	Parc des sports de Treichville, Abidjan, Ivory Coast	Burkina Faso	4–?	4–1	2018 WAFU Zone B Women's Cup
12.	23 November 2018	Accra Sports Stadium, Accra, Ghana	Cameroon	1–0	1–1	2018 Women's Africa Cup of Nations
13.	28 August 2019	Stade Augustin Monédan, Libreville, Gabon	Gabon	2–0	3–0	2020 CAF Women's Olympic qualifying tournament
14.	3 September 2019	Accra Sports Stadium, Accra, Ghana	Gabon	1–0	2–0	2020 CAF Women's Olympic qualifying tournament
15.	1 December 2023	Accra Sports Stadium, Accra, Ghana	Namibia	2–0	3–1	2024 Women's Africa Cup of Nations qualification
16.	13 October 2026	Accra Sports Stadium, Accra, Ghana	Mauritius	2–0	7–0	2028 CAF Women's Olympic qualifying tournament

== Honours ==
=== International ===
Ghana

- All African Games Gold Medal: 2015
- Africa Women Cup of Nations Bronze Medal: 2016
- WAFU Women's Cup Gold Medal and top scorer: 2018
