= Zone B =

Zone B may refer to:

- London fare Zone B, a public transport zone, located near Hartford
- Zone B east of the Morgan Line, a region of Italy under Yugoslav military administration 1945-47
- Zone B, a European division of the Davis Cup, a tennis competition
- Bantu Zone B in the Guthrie classification of Bantu languages
- WAFU Zone B Women's Cup, a West African football competition
- Zone B, a division of the Torneo Federal A, Argentine football competition
