= Salimata Simporé =

Burkinabé footballer

Personal information
- Date of birth: 29 January 1987 (age 39)
- Place of birth: Ouagadougou, Burkina Faso
- Height: 1.74 m (5 ft 9 in)
- Position: Forward

Team information
- Current team: FC Minsk

Senior career*
| Years | Team | Apps | (Gls) |
| 2005 | Princesses | | |
| 2006 | Las Vegas | | |
| 2015 | Princesses | | |
| 2016 | USFA | | |
| 2019 | Etincelles | | |
| 2020 | Dinamo Minsk | 17 | (19) |
| 2021 | Malabo Kings | 1 | (0) |
| 2022- | FC Minsk | 10 | (14) |

International career
| 2006–2010 | Equatorial Guinea | | (5) |
| 2007– | Burkina Faso | | (13) |
- * Club domestic league appearances and goals as of 8 November 2020.

Salimata Simporé (born 29 January 1987) is a Burkinabé footballer who plays as a forward for Belarusian Premier League club FC Minsk and the Burkina Faso women's national team.

== Club career ==
Simporé played in Burkina Faso for Princesses in 2005 and 2015, for USFA in 2016 and for Etincelles in 2019. In October 2006, Simporé was registered as a player for Equatorial Guinean club Las Vegas.

== International career ==
Between 2006 and 2010, Burkinabé-born Simporé used to play for Equatorial Guinea as a naturalized player, having integrated the Equatorial Guinea's squads that won the 2008 African Women's Championship and reached the second place in the 2010 African Women's Championship, which allowed Equatorial Guinea to qualify for the 2011 FIFA Women's World Cup. Around April 2011, Simporé was removed from national team by the Italian-born Brazilian coach Marcelo Frigerio, who had recently assumed, just a few months before participating in the World Cup, that Simporé was male. Since then, Simporé was never called up by Equatorial Guinea.

Simporé was a member of the Burkina Faso women's national football team in 2007 (as their captain), scoring 8 goals, and 2018.

=== International goals ===
Scores and results list Equatorial Guinea's goal tally first

| No. | Date | Venue | Opponent | Score | Result | Competition |
|---|---|---|---|---|---|---|
| 1 | 18 November 2008 | Estadio de Malabo, Malabo, Equatorial Guinea | Congo | 1–0 | 5–2 | 2008 African Women's Championship |
| 2 | 23 May 2010 | Sam Nujoma Stadium, Windhoek, Namibia | Namibia | 4–1 | 5–1 | 2010 African Women's Championship qualification |
| 3 | 8 November 2010 | Sinaba Stadium, Daveyton, South Africa | Ghana | 2–1 | 3–1 | 2010 African Women's Championship |
| 4 | 11 November 2010 | Sinaba Stadium, Daveyton, South Africa | South Africa | 1–0 | 3–1 | 2010 African Women's Championship |
| 5 | 11 November 2010 | Sinaba Stadium, Daveyton, South Africa | South Africa | 3–0 | 3–1 | 2010 African Women's Championship |

Scores and results list Burkina Faso's goal tally first

| No. | Date | Venue | Opponent | Score | Result | Competition |
|---|---|---|---|---|---|---|
| 1 | 14 February 2018 | Stade Robert Champroux, Abidjan, Ivory Coast | Niger | 1–0 | 5–1 | 2018 WAFU Women's Cup |
| 2 | 16 February 2018 | Parc des sports de Treichville, Abidjan, Ivory Coast | Ivory Coast | 1–1 | 1–1 | 2018 WAFU Women's Cup |
| 3 | 7 April 2018 | Stade du 4 Août, Ouagadougou, Burkina Faso | Gambia | 1–1 | 2–1 | 2018 Africa Women Cup of Nations qualification |
| 4 | 7 April 2018 | Stade du 4 Août, Ouagadougou, Burkina Faso | Gambia | 2–1 | 2–1 | 2018 Africa Women Cup of Nations qualification |
| 5 | 10 April 2018 | Independence Stadium, Bakau, Gambia | Gambia | 1–2 | 1–2 | 2018 Africa Women Cup of Nations qualification |

== Gender controversy ==
Beyond the mechanism by which Simporé was naturalized by Equatorial Guinea, the main controversy arose regarding whether Simporé was actually a man. In 2015, Frigerio, now a former national team coach for Equatorial Guinea, told the Brazilian press Simporé is in fact a man.

== Honors and awards ==
=== National team ===
Equatorial Guinea

- Africa Women Cup of Nations: 2008
