= Simporé =

Simporé is a surname. Notable people with the surname include:

- Saïdou Simporé (born 1992), Burkinabé footballer
- Salimata Simporé (born 1987), Burkinabé footballer
