= Inès Konan =

Ivorian footballer (born 2002)

Personal information
- Full name: Akissi Inès Mikouame Konan
- Date of birth: 8 January 2002 (age 24)
- Place of birth: Bouaké, Ivory Coast
- Height: 1.65 m (5 ft 5 in)
- Position: Forward

Team information
- Current team: Strasbourg
- Number: 19

Senior career*
Years	Team	Apps	(Gls)
- Kekrenou
2022–2025	Fleury	35	(2)
2025–	Strasbourg	3	(5)

International career^{‡}
2019–	Ivory Coast	4+	(2+)
- * Club domestic league appearances and goals as of 28 September 2025 ‡ National team caps and goals as of 3 June 2025

Akissi Inès Mikouame Konan (born 8 January 2002) is an Ivorian professional footballer who plays as a forward for Première Ligue club Strasbourg and the Ivory Coast national team.

== International career ==
Konan capped for Ivory Coast at senior level during the 2020 CAF Women's Olympic Qualifying Tournament (fourth round).

=== International goals ===
No.	Date	Venue	Opponent	Score	Result	Competition
1.	25 October 2021	Robert Champroux Stadium, Abidjan, Ivory Coast	Niger	10–0	11–0	2022 Women's Africa Cup of Nations qualification
2.	30 May 2022	Felix Houphouet Boigny Stadium, Abidjan, Ivory Coast	Ghana	1–1	3–3	Friendly
3.	30 May 2022	Felix Houphouet Boigny Stadium, Abidjan, Ivory Coast	Ghana	3–3	3–3	Friendly
4.	28 February 2026	Felix Houphouet Boigny Stadium, Abidjan, Ivory Coast	Benin	2–0	2–1	Friendly
5.	12 April 2026	Alassane Ouattara Stadium, Abidjan, Ivory Coast	Turks and Caicos Islands	11–1	15–1	2026 FIFA Series
6.	12 April 2026	Alassane Ouattara Stadium, Abidjan, Ivory Coast	Turks and Caicos Islands	13–1	15–1	2026 FIFA Series
7.	12 April 2026	Alassane Ouattara Stadium, Abidjan, Ivory Coast	Turks and Caicos Islands	14–1	15–1	2026 FIFA Series
8.	27 July 2026	Larbi Zaouli Stadium, Casablanca, Morocco	Burkina Faso	2–0	4–1	2026 Women's Africa Cup of Nations
9.	27 July 2026	Larbi Zaouli Stadium, Casablanca, Morocco	Burkina Faso	3–0	4–1	2026 Women's Africa Cup of Nations
10.	4 August 2026	Larbi Zaouli Stadium, Casablanca, Morocco	Tanzania	2–0	2–1	2026 Women's Africa Cup of Nations
11.	8 August 2026	Moulay Rachid Stadium, Casablanca, Morocco	Algeria	1–0	1–2	2026 Women's Africa Cup of Nations
12.	13 August 2026	Larbi Zaouli Stadium, Casablanca, Morocco	Ghana	1–0	1–2	2026 Women's Africa Cup of Nations

== Honours ==
Individual

- Coupe de France Féminine top scorer: 2024–25

== See also ==
- List of Ivory Coast women's international footballers
