= Chidinma Okeke =

Nigerian footballer (born 2000)

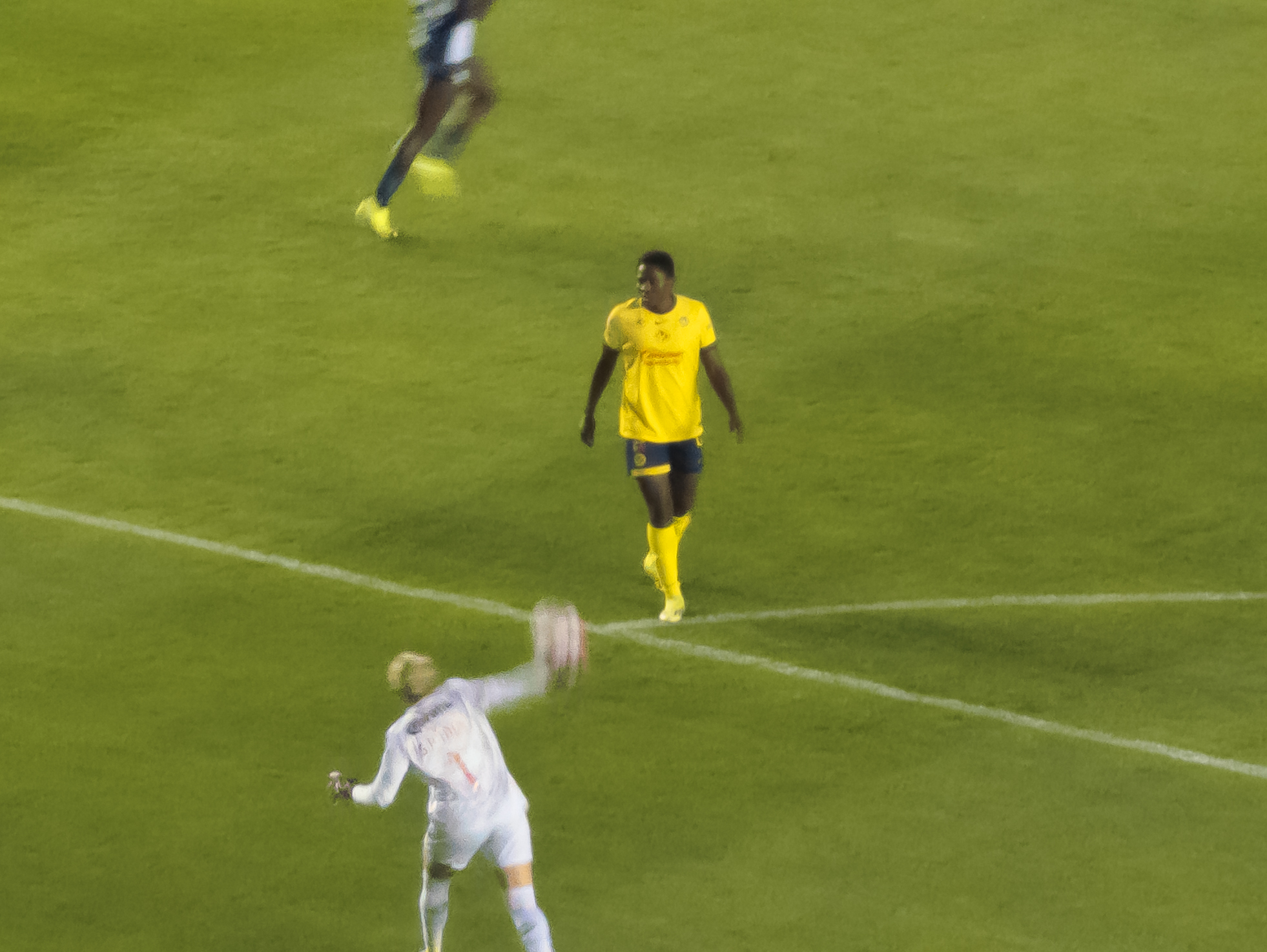
- Okeke playing as a defender for Club América of Mexico.

Personal information
- Full name: Chidinma Nkeruka Okeke
- Date of birth: 11 August 2000 (age 26)
- Place of birth: Warri, Nigeria
- Height: 1.75 m (5 ft 9 in)
- Position: Centre-back

Team information
- Current team: Napoli
- Number: 12

Senior career*
Years	Team	Apps	(Gls)
2016–2019	FC Robo		
2019–2021	Madrid CFF	13	(0)
2022–2023	Hapoel Be'er Sheva	26	(6)
2023–2024	MyNavi Sendai	9	(0)
2024–2026	América	55	(4)
2026–	Napoli	0	(0)

International career^{‡}
2016	Nigeria U17	2	(0)
2018	Nigeria U20	4	(0)
2019–	Nigeria	13	(0)
- * Club domestic league appearances and goals as of 24 May 2026 ‡ National team caps and goals as of 31 July 2024

Chidinma Nkeruka Okeke (born 11 August 2000) is a Nigerian professional footballer who plays as a centre-back for Serie A club Napoli and the Nigeria women's national team. She was formerly at FC Robo in the Nigeria Women Premier League, Madrid CFF in Liga F, Hapoel Be'er Sheva in Ligat Nashim and MyNavi Sendai in WE League. She was part of the Nigerian team that won the 2019 WAFU Women's Cup in Ivory Coast.

== Career ==
In 2017, she lost to Rasheedat Ajibade in the women's division finals of Nigeria Freestyle Football competition.

In August 2019, she signed for Madrid CFF in Spanish Primera División, and made her first team debut in a win against Real Betis on 8 September 2019.

In October 2023, she signed for MyNavi Sendai.

On 20 August 2024, the Mexican Ambassador to Nigeria leaked on Twitter that Okeke would be joining Liga MX Femenil side Club América during the 2024 summer transfer window. She was officially announced by América as their new player a few hours later on the same day.

Although Okeke was expected to make her debut with América almost immediately, head coach Ángel Villacampa ruled her out of play time for a few weeks due to poor fitness. Okeke made her league debut with América on 9 September 2024, in an away match against Mazatlán in which she was part of the starting line-up By the end of the Apertura 2024 tournament, Okeke became a regular starter for América.

== International career ==
In 2016, Okeke represented Nigeria women's national U-17 football team at the 2016 FIFA U-17 Women's World Cup.

In July 2018, she was named by Coach Christopher Danjuma in the final squad-list of Nigeria women's national under-20 football team for the 2018 FIFA U-20 Women's World Cup.

At the 2019 WAFU Women's Cup, Okeke was on the scoresheet as Nigerian team defeated Niger to qualify for the semi-finals.

She was also included in the Nigerian squad for 2019 FIFA Women's World Cup.

Okeke was called up to the Nigeria squad for the 2024 Summer Olympics.

== Honours ==
Club América

- Liga MX Femenil: Clausura 2026
- CONCACAF W Champions Cup: 2025–26
