= Adèle Kabré =

Burkinabé footballer (born 2004)

Personal information
- Full name: Naomie Adèle Kabré
- Date of birth: 30 December 2004 (age 21)
- Place of birth: Burkina Faso
- Position: Forward

Team information
- Current team: Liaoning

Senior career*
Years	Team	Apps	(Gls)
2017–2023	AO Etincelle		
2023–2024	Fatih Karagümrük	3	(0)
2025–	Liaoning	1	(2)

International career^{‡}
2022–2024	Burkina Faso U20	7	(6)
2021–	Burkina Faso	8	(6)
- * Club domestic league appearances and goals as of 8 March 2025 ‡ National team caps and goals as of 13 February 2025

Naomie Adèle Kabré (born 30 December 2004) is a Burkinabé professional footballer who plays as a forward for Chinese Women's Super League club Liaoning Shenbei Hefeng and the Burkina Faso national team.

== Club career ==
On 29 September 2023, She was crowned the "Queen of Women's Football" at the first-ever Nuit du Football Féminin in Burkina Faso and also received the award for the year's top scorer.

In October 2023, Kabré signed her first professional contract with Turkish Women's Football Super League club Fatih Karagümrük. After making her debut for the club in a match against Hakkarigücü Spor on 21 October 2023, she played just two more matches before being sidelined by a cruciate ligament injury.

In February 2025, Kabré signed a two-year contract with Chinese Women's Super League club Liaoning Shenbei Hefeng.

== International career ==
Having made her senior debut at 16, Kabré scored her first international goal at the age of 17 in a 6–0 triumph over Guinea-Bissau in the 2022 Women's Africa Cup of Nations qualification. Later in June of the same year, she was selected for the 2022 Women's Africa Cup of Nations, representing Burkina Faso's debut in the tournament, and was the second youngest player in the squad. She scored the equalizer against Uganda, securing Burkina Faso's first-ever point in the tournament's history.

In May 2023, Kabré represented Burkina Faso at the Under-20 level, being selected for the 2023 WAFU Zone B U-20 Women's Cup in Ghana, where Burkina Faso secured bronze. She scored a hat-trick in a dominant 8–0 victory over Niger.

== Career statistics ==
=== International ===
Scores and results list Burkina Faso's goal tally first, score column indicates score after each Kabré goal.

List of international goals scored by Adèle Kabré
No.	Date	Venue	Opponent	Score	Result	Competition
1	16 February 2022	Estádio 24 de Setembro, Bissau, Guinea-Bissau	Guinea-Bissau	3–0	6–0	2022 WAFCON qualification
2	8 July 2022	Stade Mohammed V, Casablanca, Morocco	Uganda	2–2	2–2	2022 WAFCON
3	9 July 2023	Stade de l'Amitié, Cotonou, Benin	Benin	2–0	4–1	Friendly
4	26 September 2023	Stade de la Paix, Bouaké, Ivory Coast	Eswatini	1–0	3–0	2024 WAFCON qualification
5	26 September 2023	Stade de la Paix, Bouaké, Ivory Coast	Eswatini	2–0	3–0	2024 WAFCON qualification
6	16 December 2024	FENIFOOT Technical Center, Niamey, Niger	Niger	1–0	3–0	Friendly
7	26 February 2025	Stade du 26 Mars, Bamako, Mali	Burundi	1–0	4–1	2026 WAFCON qualification
8	26 February 2025	Stade du 26 Mars, Bamako, Mali	Burundi	2–0	4–1	2026 WAFCON qualification
9	26 February 2025	Stade du 26 Mars, Bamako, Mali	Burundi	4–1	4–1	2026 WAFCON qualification
10	24 October 2025	Stade du 4 Août, Ouagadougou, Burkina Faso	Togo	2–0	2–0	2026 WAFCON qualification
11	28 November 2025	Marrakesh Stadium, Marrakesh, Morocco	Morocco	1–1	1–1	Friendly
