= Grace Asantewaa =

Ghanaian footballer (born 2000)

Personal information
- Date of birth: 5 December 2000 (age 25)
- Place of birth: Brong-Ahafo, Ghana
- Height: 1.70 m (5 ft 7 in)
- Position: Defensive midfielder

Team information
- Current team: Tigres UANL
- Number: 5

Senior career*
Years	Team	Apps	(Gls)
–2019	Ampem Darkoa		
2019–2021	Logroño	45	(4)
2021–2023	Real Betis	57	(8)
2023–2026	Juárez	90	(18)
2026–	Tigres UANL	4	(0)

International career^{‡}
2018–	Ghana	12	(3)
- * Club domestic league appearances and goals as of 29 November 2023 ‡ National team caps and goals as of 28 May 2024

Grace Asantewaa (born 5 December 2000) is a Ghanaian professional footballer who plays as a midfielder for Liga MX Femenil club Tigres UANL and the Ghana women's national team.

== International career ==
Asantewaa competed for Ghana at the 2018 Africa Women Cup of Nations, playing in three matches.

== International goals ==
No.	Date	Venue	Opponent	Score	Result	Competition
1.	16 February 2018	Stade Robert Champroux, Abidjan, Ivory Coast	Niger	3–0	9–0	2018 WAFU Zone B Women's Cup
2.	18 February 2018	Parc des sports de Treichville, Abidjan, Ivory Coast	Burkina Faso	2–?	4–1	2018 WAFU Zone B Women's Cup
3.	8 April 2023	Accra Sports Stadium, Accra, Ghana	Senegal	2–0	3–0	Friendly
