= Bénédicte Simon =

Ghanaian footballer (born 1997)

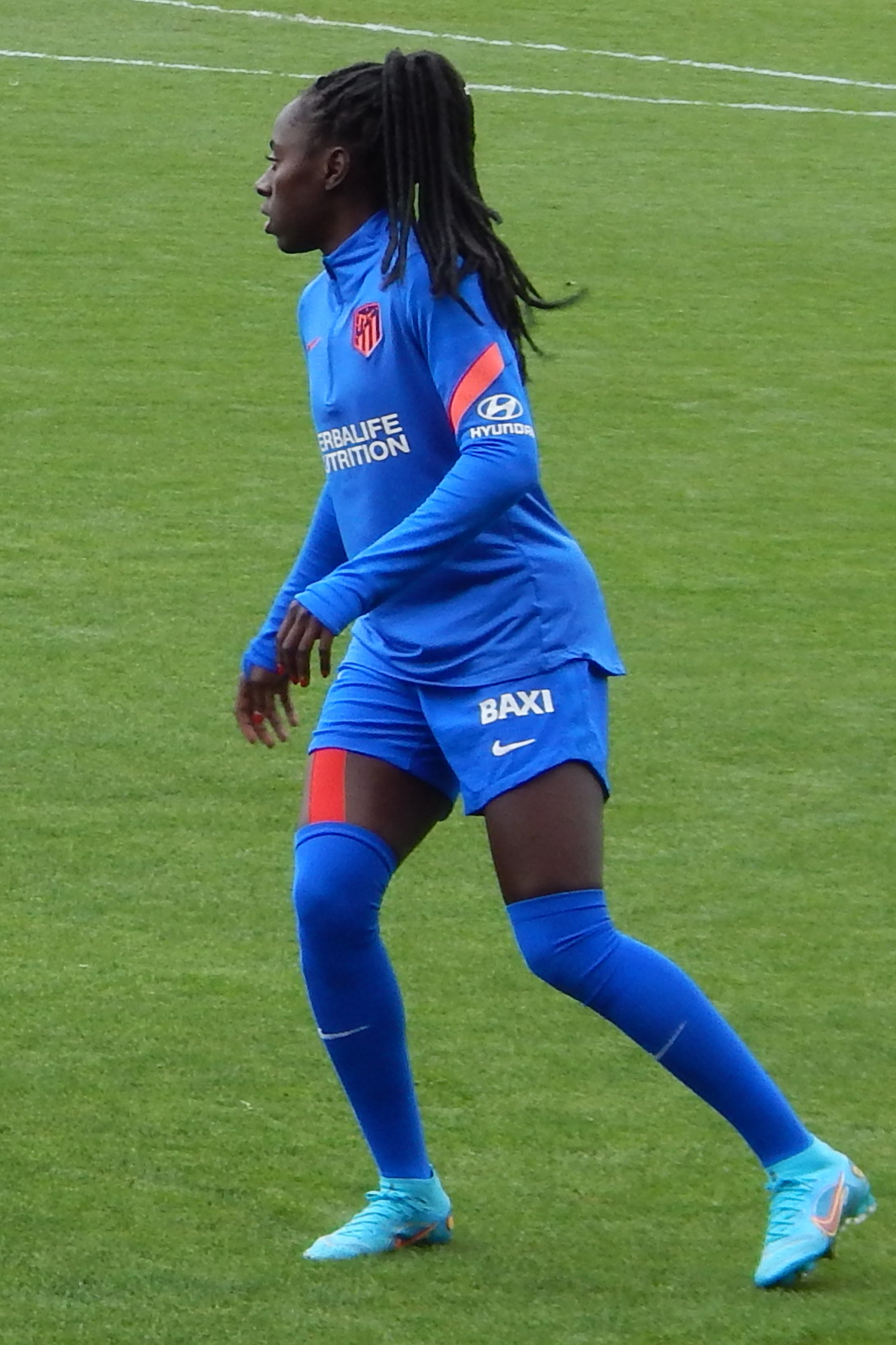
- Simon with Atlético Madrid in 2022

Personal information
- Date of birth: 2 June 1997 (age 29)
- Place of birth: Mantes-la-Jolie, France
- Position: Defender

Team information
- Current team: Servette
- Number: 78

Youth career
- 2011–2015: FC Mantois

Senior career*
Years	Team	Apps	(Gls)
2015–2016	Aurillac Arpajon	21	(8)
2016–2020	Reims	72	(5)
2020–2023	Paris Saint-Germain	7	(0)
2021–2022	→ Atlético Madrid (loan)	12	(0)
2023–2024	Juventus	2	(0)
2023	→ Levante Las Planas (loan)	14	(0)
2024	→ Sassuolo (loan)	3	(0)
2024–2025	Racing Power FC	11	(0)
2025	Valencia CF	13	(0)
2025–	Servette	11	(0)

International career^{‡}
2025–	Ghana	1	(0)
- * Club domestic league appearances and goals as of 22 November 2025 ‡ National team caps and goals as of 2 December 2025

Bénédicte Simon (born 2 June 1997) is a professional footballer who plays as a defender for Swiss Women's Super League club Servette. Born in France, she plays for the Ghana national team.

== Club career ==
Bénédicte Simon began learning to play football at FC Mantois, a club in her hometown. In 2015, she moved up to France's Division 2, playing with FC Aurillac Arpajon.

In 2016, she joined the Stade de Reims on a four-year deal, which was still in France's Division 2. In 2019, she gained promotion to the Division 1 Féminine with the club.

On 15 June 2020, she signed for Paris Saint-Germain on a three-year deal. Simon made her debut with PSG on 25 September 2020 against her former club Stade de Reims. She played her first Champions League match with of her career in a Round of 16 tie against Górnik Łęczna. PSG won the first Division 1 Féminine title of their history that season, but Simon only played 280 minutes across all competitions.

Simon was sent to Atlético Madrid on loan without an option to buy for the 2021–22 season.

On 30 January 2023, Simon joined Juventus on a contract that runs through to 30 June 2025.

On 13 July 2023, Simon joined Levante Las Planas on loan with an option to buy for the 2023–24 season.

== International career ==
Born in France, Simon is of Ghanaian descent. In April 2021, she was called up for international duty for the first time with the French under-23 team.

Simon made her debut for the Ghana national team on 2 December 2025.

== International goals ==
No.	Date	Venue	Opponent	Score	Result	Competition
1.	8 October 2026	Côte d'Or National Sports Complex, Saint Pierre, Mauritius	Mauritius	3–0	3–0	2028 CAF Women's Olympic qualifying tournament

== Honors ==
Reims

- Division 2 Féminine: 2018–19

Paris Saint-Germain

- Division 1 Féminine: 2020–21
