= Balkissa Sawadogo =

Burkinabé footballer (born 1998)

Personal information
- Date of birth: 2 October 1998 (age 28)
- Position: Forward

Team information
- Current team: Al-Yarmook
- Number: 11

Youth career
- 2014–2015: ASO

Senior career*
Years	Team	Apps	(Gls)
2015–2023	USFA		
2023	AS FAR		
2023–2024	1207 Antalya Spor	27	(4)
2024–2025	Phoenix Marrakech		
2026–	Al-Yarmook	12	(11)

International career^{‡}
2015–	Burkina Faso	36	(7)
- * Club domestic league appearances and goals ‡ National team caps and goals as of 31 July 2026

Balkissa Sawadogo (born 2 October 1998) is a Burkinabé professional footballer who plays as Forward for Al-Yarmouk Club in the Saudi Women's First Division League and the Burkina Faso national team.

== Early life ==
Sawadogo began playing football in her neighborhood with boys before joining the girls' team at Nelson Mandela High School in 2011, where she competed in events such as USSU-BF and Airtel Jeunes Talents.

She is one of the relatively few Burkinabé girls of her generation to receive parental support for the sport; her mother was a football fan who encouraged her, while her father overcame initial hesitation related to family and social prejudices. She holds a professional bachelor's degree in marketing and management and has balanced studies with her athletic career.

== Club career ==
Sawadogo began her senior career with ASO in 2014, where she quickly established herself as one of the country's brightest young talents, earning recognition for her pace, technical ability and vision. In 2015, she joined Burkinabè club USFA, where she enjoyed a highly successful spell, winning multiple Burkinabè Women's Championships, Coupe du Faso titles and Super Cups. During her time at the club, she also received several individual honours, including awards for Best Player, Top Scorer and Best Assist Provider.

After eight years with USFA, Sawadogo moved abroad in 2023 to join Moroccan champions ASFAR. During her time with the club, she won the Moroccan Women's Championship and the Throne Cup. She subsequently signed for Turkish Women's Football Super League side 1207 Antalya Spor before returning to Morocco to join Phoenix Marrakech.

In 2026, Sawadogo moved to Saudi Arabia, signing with Saudi Women's First Division League side Al Yarmook.

== International career ==
First called up to the Burkina Faso national team in 2015, Sawadogo went on to represent her country at the 2018 WAFU Zone B Women's Cup and the 2019 edition, before featuring in Burkina Faso's inaugural campaign at the 2022 Women's Africa Cup of Nations.

Selected for les Étalons Dames's squad at the 2026 Women's Africa Cup of Nations, Sawadogo scored the winning goal in a 2–1 defeat of Tanzania on 31 July 2026, earning the nation's first victory in the competition.

=== International goals ===
Scores and results list Burkina Faso's goal tally first, score column indicates score after each Sawadogo goal.

No.	Date	Venue	Opponent	Score	Result	Competition	Ref.
1	11 May 2019	Parc des sports de Treichville, Abidjan	Mali	1–1	1–3	2019 WAFU Zone B Women's Cup	
2	14 May 2019	Parc des sports de Treichville, Abidjan	Niger	1–0	5–0	2019 WAFU Zone B Women's Cup	
3	14 May 2019	Parc des sports de Treichville, Abidjan	Niger	2–0	5–0	2019 WAFU Zone B Women's Cup	
4	24 October 2021	Stade de l'Amitié, Cotonou	Benin	2–0	3–1	2022 WAfCON qualification	
5	18 July 2023	Stade du 26 Mars, Bamako	Mali	1–0	2–2 (a.e.t.)	2024 CAF Olympic qualifying tournament	
6	18 July 2023	Stade du 26 Mars, Bamako	Mali	2–1	2–2 (a.e.t.)	2024 CAF Olympic qualifying tournament	
7	31 July 2026	Larbi Zaouli Stadium, Casablanca	Tanzania	2–1	2–1	2026 WAfCON	
