= Pascal Sawadogo =

Burkinabé football manager

Personal information
- Place of birth: Burkina Faso

Managerial career
- Years: Team
- 2021–: Burkina Faso (women)

Pascal Sawadogo is a Burkinabé football manager who manages the Burkina Faso women's national football team.

== Life and career ==
Sawadogo was born in Burkina Faso. He studied sociology and geography. He has worked as a physical education teacher and in a non-governmental organization. He has also worked as manager of the women's team of a Burkina Faso secondary school. He founded Burkinabé women's side Étincelles.

In 2021, he was appointed manager of the Burkina Faso women's national football team. He has also worked as manager of the Burkina Faso women's under-23 national football team He helped the team achieve qualification for the 2022 Women's Africa Cup of Nations. However, they were unable to reach the knockout rounds during the tournament. He has regarded Scottish manager Alex Ferguson as his football idol. He has been a supporter of English Premier League side Manchester United.
