= Faustina Ampah =

Ghanaian defender (born 1996)

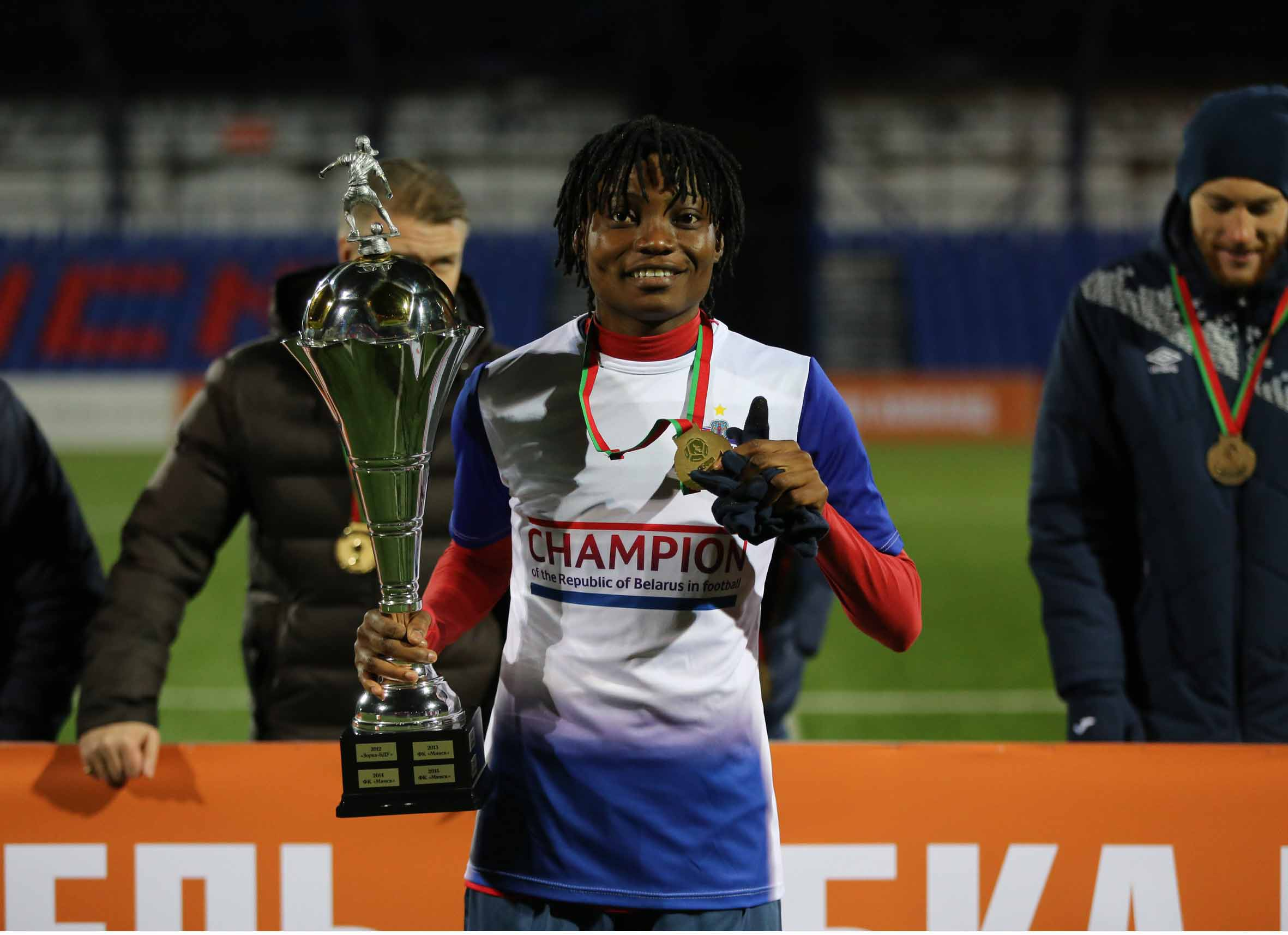

Personal information
- Full name: Faustina Ampah
- Date of birth: November 30, 1996 (age 29)
- Place of birth: Accra, Ghana
- Height: 1.73 m (5 ft 8 in)
- Position: Defender

Team information
- Current team: FC Minsk
- Number: 15

Senior career*
Years	Team	Apps	(Gls)
2009–2017	Blessed Ladies FC	60	(16)
2016	→ Lokomotiva Brno H. H. (Loan)	8	(3)
2017–2018	FC Minsk	28	(12)

International career
2012–2016	Ghana U20		
2017	Ghana	6	(1)
- * Club domestic league appearances and goals

Faustina Ampah (born November 30, 1996) is a Ghanaian defender currently playing for Belarus side, FC Minsk. Ampah is one of the two Ghanaians to have played in the round of 32 of UEFA Women's Champions League as at October 2017.

== Club career ==
Ampah began her professional football career in Ghana, with Blessed Ladies and ended the 7 -year stay with the Kasoa based side by joining Czech Republic's Lokomotiva Brno Horní Heršpice on loan. Faustina Ampah was part of the FC Minsk team in the 2017-18 UEFA Women's Champions League, exiting the competition at the round of 32, losing to Slavia Prague and becoming the first Ghanaian to play in the round of 32 of the UEFA Women's Champions League.

== International career ==
Faustina Ampah had her FIFA World Cup debut at the 2012 FIFA U-20 Women's World Cup hosted by Japan in 2012. Her debut game was against United States that ended 4:0 in favor of United States. Faustina Ampah was also part of the 2014 FIFA U-20 Women's World Cup and 2016 FIFA U-20 Women's World Cup making her the only Ghanaian to represent the nation at three FIFA U-20 Women's World Cup.

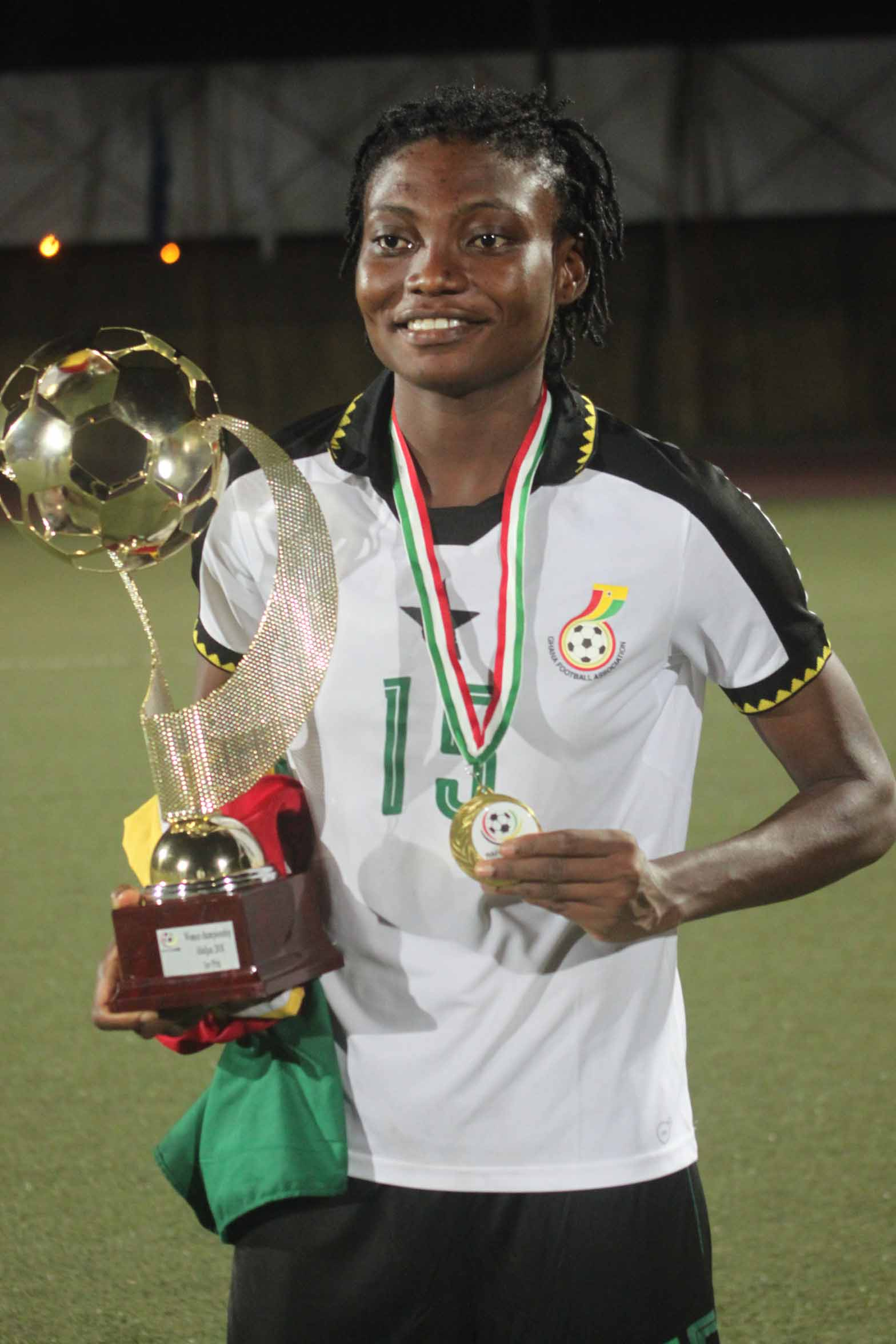
Faustina Ampah wins 2018 WAFU Women's Cup with Ghana's National Women's Football Team

Ampah's first competitive tournament for the Ghana women's national football team was the 2018 WAFU Women's Cup. She played in all five games of the tournament helping the Black Queens to the first place title. She scored a semifinal equalizer against Nigeria women's national football team. She won the player of the match in that game.

== Honours ==
=== Club ===
FC Minsk

- Belarusian Women's Super Cup 2017 Runner Up
- Belarusian Premier League (women) 2017 Winners
- Belarusian Women's Cup 2017 Winners
- Belarusian Premier League (women) Super Cup 2018 - Winners

=== National team ===
Ghana Women's National Football Team

- 2018 WAFU Women's Cup Champions
