= 2018 WAFU Zone B Women's Cup =

Tournament details
- Host country: Côte d'Ivoire
- Dates: 10–24 February 2018
- Teams: 8 (from 1 sub-confederation)
- Venue: 3 (in 1 host city)

Final positions
- Champions: Ghana (1st title)
- Runners-up: Ivory Coast
- Third place: Nigeria
- Fourth place: Mali

Tournament statistics
- Matches played: 16
- Goals scored: 62 (3.88 per match)
- Top scorer(s): (Ghana) Portia Boakye (4 goals)
- Best player: (Ghana) Janet Egyir
- Best goalkeeper: (Ivory Coast) Cynthia Djohore

The 2018 WAFU Zone B Women's Cup was the maiden edition of the international women's football event for teams from Zone B of the West African Football Union (WAFU). The competition was hosted by Ivory Coast at three match venues. Ghana defeated Ivory Coast in the final, making them simultaneously champions of both the men's and women's regional tournaments. Portia Boakye was the top scorer with four goals.

== Draw ==
The draw was held on 9 January in Abidjan. Six of WAFU's Zone B members entered a team (Benin did not enter), with Mali and Senegal (from Zone A) being invited to make up the numbers.

== Group stage ==
=== Group A ===
Pos	Team	Pld	W	D	L	GF	GA	GD	Pts	Qualification
1	Ivory Coast (H)	3	2	1	0	9	1	+8	7	Advance to semi-finals
2	Ghana	3	2	0	1	13	2	+11	6	Advance to semi-finals
3	Burkina Faso	3	1	1	1	7	6	+1	4	
4	Niger	3	0	0	3	1	21	−20	0	

(H) Hosts
14 February 2018
16:30

Ivory Coast	1–0	Ghana
Kpaho 63'	Report (FoF)

Robert Champroux Stadium, Marcory
14 February 2018
19:00

Burkina Faso	5–1	Niger
Simporé 8'; Nana 13'; Alassane 20' (o.g.); Nikiéma 65'; Millogo 74'	Report (FoF)	Moussa 70'

Robert Champroux Stadium, Marcory

16 February 2018
16:30

Ghana	9–0	Niger
Boakye 2', 52'; Egyir 31', 57'; Asantewaa 35'; Okyere 45' (pen.); Appiah 45+2'; Ayiyem 55', 70'	Report (FoF)

Parc des sports de Treichville, Treichville
16 February 2018
19:00

Ivory Coast	1–1	Burkina Faso
Diakité 50'	Report	Simporé 89' (pen.)

Parc des sports de Treichville, Treichville
Referee: Vincentia Amedome (Togo)

18 February 2018
16:30

Ivory Coast	7–0	Niger
Kpaho 12'; Lohoues 15'; Cissé 58'; Nrehy 59', 65', 90'; Essoh 67'	Report (FoF)

Robert Champroux Stadium, Marcory
Referee: Teneba Bagayoko (Mali)
18 February 2018
16:30

Ghana	4–1	Burkina Faso
Boakye 21', 70'; Asantewaa 39'; Okyere 55'	Report (FoF)	Simporé 7'

Parc des sports de Treichville, Treichville

=== Group B ===
Pos	Team	Pld	W	D	L	GF	GA	GD	Pts	Qualification
1	Nigeria	3	3	0	0	7	1	+6	9	Advance to semi-finals
2	Mali	3	2	0	1	9	1	+8	6	Advance to semi-finals
3	Senegal	3	1	0	2	6	4	+2	3	
4	Togo	3	0	0	3	1	17	−16	0	

15 February 2018
16:30

Senegal	6–0	Togo
Ngom 7'; Diédhiou 11', 31'; Sagna 28'; Diop 78'; Diakhaté 86'	Report (FoF)

Parc des sports de Treichville, Treichville
15 February 2018
19:00

Nigeria	1–0	Mali
Efih 90+4'	Report (FoF)

Parc des sports de Treichville, Treichville

17 February 2018
16:30

Nigeria	3–0	Senegal
Ajibade 22', 32', 36'	Report (FoF)

Parc des sports de Treichville, Treichville
17 February 2018
19:00

Mali	8–0	Togo
F. Diarra 16', 31'; H. Traoré 33'; Touré 35', 72'; A. Traoré 37'; A. Diarra 62'; S. Diarra 83'	Report (FoF)

Parc des sports de Treichville, Treichville

19 February 2018
19:00

Nigeria	3–1	Togo
Imo 40'; Uchendu 48'; Wogu 71'	Report (FoF)	Woedikou 82'

Robert Champroux Stadium, Marcory
19 February 2018
19:00

Mali	1–0	Senegal
A. Diarra 45'	Report (FoF)

Parc des sports de Treichville, Treichville

== Knockout stage ==
=== Semifinals ===
22 February 2018
16:30

Ivory Coast	2–0	Mali
Kpaho 30', 33'

Parc des sports de Treichville, Treichville

22 February 2018
19:00

Nigeria	1–1	Ghana
Ampah 18'	Report	Ogebe 8'
Penalties
	4–5

Parc des sports de Treichville, Treichville

=== Third place match ===
24 February 2018
16:30

Mali	1–2	Nigeria
F. Diarra 10'	Report	Uchendu 14', 40'

Robert Champroux Stadium, Marcory

=== Final ===
24 February 2018
19:00

Ivory Coast	0–1	Ghana
	Report	Egyir 2'

Robert Champroux Stadium, Marcory
Referee: Vincentia Amedome (Togo)

== Top scorers ==
4 goals

- (Ghana) Portia Boakye

3 goals

- (Nigeria) Rasheedat Ajibade
- (Ivory Coast) Ines Nrehy
- (Ghana) Janet Egyir
- (Nigeria) Chinaza Uchendu

2 goals

- (Ghana) Grace Asantewaa
- (Ghana) Priscilla Okyere
- (Ghana) Jane Ayieyam
- (Senegal) Mariama Diedhiou
- (Ivory Coast) Nina Kpaho
- (Mali) Aguecha Diarra
- (Mali) Fatoumata Diarra
- (Mali) Bassira Touré
- (Burkina Faso) Salimata Simporé
