= Fatoumata Diarra =

Fatoumata Diarra may refer to:

- Fatoumata Dembélé Diarra (born 1949), Malian lawyer and judge
- Fatoumata Diarra (footballer) (born 1986), Malian footballer on the 2024 Women's Africa Cup of Nations squad
