= Rasmata Sawadogo =

Burkinabé footballer (born 2003)

Personal information
- Date of birth: 1 January 2003 (age 23)
- Place of birth: Burkina Faso
- Position: Midfielder

Team information
- Current team: Hakkarigücü
- Number: 10

Senior career*
Years	Team	Apps	(Gls)
2021–2024	USFA		
2024–	Hakkarigücü	26	(6)

International career
2022–	Burkina Faso		
- * Club domestic league appearances and goals as of 15 October 2024

Rasmata Sawadogo (born 1 January 2003) is a Burkinabé women's football midfielder who plays in the Turkish Super League for Hakkarigücü and the Burkina Faso women's national team.

== Club career ==
Sawadogo played for USFA in her country, and took part at the 2022 CAF Women's Champions League WAFU Zone B Qualifiers.

In September 2024, she moved to Turkey, and signed with Hakkarigücü to play in the 2024–25 Super League season. The next season, her contract was extended.

== International career ==
Sawadogo is a member of Burkina Faso women's national football team. She played at the 2022 Women's Africa Cup of Nations, 2024 Women's Africa Cup of Nations qualification and 2026 Women's Africa Cup of Nations qualification.
