= Alimata Bélem =

Burkinabé footballer (born 2004)

Personal information
- Date of birth: 2 September 2004 (age 22)
- Place of birth: Ouagadougou, Burkina Faso
- Height: 1.71 m (5 ft 7 in)
- Position: Centre back

Team information
- Current team: SD Eibar (on loan from the Washington Spirit)
- Number: 12

Senior career*
Years	Team	Apps	(Gls)
2021–2023	ASO		
2023–2025	Dux Logroño	53	(2)
2025–2026	Eibar	29	(0)
2026–	Washington Spirit	0	(0)
2026–	→ Eibar (loan)	0	(0)

International career
2019–2023	Burkina Faso U20	10	(1)
2021–	Burkina Faso	9	(1)
- * Club domestic league appearances and goals as of 31 May 2026

Alimata Bélem (born 2 September 2004) is a Burkinabé professional footballer who plays as defender for Liga F club Eibar, on loan from the Washington Spirit, and the Burkina Faso national team.

== Club career ==
In February 2023, Dux Logroño announced the signing of Bélem on a two-year contract, her first professional experience abroad. On 12 February 2023, she made her debut in a 1–0 defeat against Juan Grande, coming on as a substitute in the 64th minute. A year later, on 21 January 2024, she scored her first goal for the club, securing a 1–0 victory against CP Cacereño. The following season, she helped Dux Logroño achieve promotion from the Primera Federación.

On 3 July 2025, Bélem joined Eibar in the Spanish first division, signing a two-year contract.

On 21 July 2026, Bélem signed a four-year contract with the National Women's Soccer League (NWSL)'s Washington Spirit, though she would finish the year on loan with her former club Eibar.

== International career ==
With the under-20 national team, Bélem was called up for the 2019 UNAF U-20 Women's Tournament, where Burkina Faso claimed the silver medal, and also competed in the FIFA World Cup Costa Rica 2020 qualifiers. She also captained the Burkinabé squad during the 2023 WAFU Zone B U-20 Women's Cup, where they secured the bronze medal.

Bélem was called up to the senior team for the first time in December 2019 for friendly matches and made her debut on 17 December 2019, against Benin in a 6–2 victory. She scored her first goal during the double header. After Burkina Faso's historic qualification for the 2022 Women's Africa Cup of Nations, Bélem was included in the final squad, making her one of the youngest players in the tournament at just 18.

== Career statistics ==
=== International ===
As of match played 9 August 2024

Appearances and goals by national team and year
National team	Year	Apps	Goals
Burkina Faso	2019	2	1
Burkina Faso	2020	0	0
Burkina Faso	2021	2	0
Burkina Faso	2022	5	0
Burkina Faso	2023	6	1
Burkina Faso	2024	0	0
Total		15	2

Scores and results list Burkina Faso's goal tally first, score column indicates score after each Bélem goal.

List of international goals scored by Alimata Bélem
No.	Date	Venue	Opponent	Score	Result	Competition
1.	17 December 2019	FBF National Technical Center, Ouagadougou, Burkina Faso	Benin	?–?	6–2	Friendly
2.	20 September 2023	Somhlolo National Stadium, Lobamba, Eswatini	Eswatini	1–0	3–2	2024 WAFCON qualifying
