= Adama Congo =

Burkinabé footballer (born 2004)

Adama Congo (born 11 April 2004) is a Burkinabè footballer who plays as a striker.

== Early life ==
Congo was born on 11 April 2004 in Ouagadougou. She started playing football at the age of seven.

== Club career ==
Congo has been described as "certainly one of Burkina's best-known players... first scorer in the history of the women's national team in the final phase of the African Cup of Nations". In 2022, Congo signed for Equatoguinean side Malabo Kings, becoming one of the first Burkinabé female players to play abroad.

== International career ==
Congo was described as having a "brilliant performance during the last African Cup of Nations (Women's CAN), Morocco 2022".

== Style of play ==
Congo can operate as a striker, winger, or attacking midfielder.

== Personal life ==
Congo's father initially did not allow her to play football.
