= Burkina Faso women's national football team =

Women's national association football team representing Burkina Faso

Burkina Faso
- Nickname(s): Étalons Dames (Ladies Stallions)
- Association: Burkinabé Football Federation
- Confederation: CAF
- Sub-confederation: WAFU (West Africa)
- Most caps: Danielle Cudmore (5)
- Top scorer: Danielle Cudmore (2)
- Home stadium: Stadio Paul Wilkins
- FIFA code: BFA
First colours	Second colours

FIFA ranking
- Current: 118 (16 June 2026)
- Highest: 97 (March 2018)
- Lowest: 141 (October 2022 – June 2023)

First international
- Burkina Faso 10–0 Niger (Ouagadougou, Burkina Faso; 2 September 2007)

Biggest win
- Burkina Faso 10–0 Niger (Ouagadougou, Burkina Faso; 2 September 2007)

Biggest defeat
- Morocco 5–0 Burkina Faso (Rabat, Morocco; 27 February 2026)

World Cup
- Appearances: 0

Olympic Games
- Appearances: 0

Africa Women Cup of Nations
- Appearances: 2 (first in 2022)
- Best result: Group stage (2022, 2026)

The Burkina Faso women's national football team represents Burkina Faso in international women's football. It is governed by the Burkinabé Football Federation. It played its first match on 2 September 2007 in Ouagadougou against Niger and won 10–0, the best result till today. Its next matches were against Niger (5–0) and Mali (2–4).

In the 2014 African Women's Championship qualification against Ghana, Burkina Faso lost by 6–0 on aggregate. Tunisia beat them 2–0 on aggregate in the 2016 Africa Women Cup of Nations qualification. The tie of Burkina Faso and Gambia in the 2018 qualifying tournament was a 3–3 draw on aggregate; Gambia won 5–3 on penalties.

The Burkina Faso women's national football team play their home matches at the Stade du 4 Août.

== History ==
Its first official match took place on September 2, 2007, against Niger in Ouagadougou. Burkina Faso qualified for the first major competition in its history by winning the second round of qualifying for the 2022 African Women's Cup of Nations against Guinea-Bissau on 23 February 2022.

== Results and fixtures ==
The following is a list of match results in the last 12 months, as well as any future matches that have been scheduled.

Legend

Win Draw Lose Fixture

=== 2025 ===
24 October 2025 2026 WAFCON qualifying	Burkina Faso	2–0	Togo	Ouagadougou
16:00 UTC+0	R. Sawadogo 65' (pen.); Kabré 89' (pen.)	Report (FIFA)		Stadium: Stade du 4 Août; Referee: Mariétou Fall (Senegal)

28 October 2025 2026 WAFCON qualifying	Togo	0–1	Burkina Faso	Lomé
16:00 UTC+0		Report (FIFA)	Congo 45+4'	Stadium: Stade de Kégué; Referee: Zakia El Grini (Morocco)
Note: Burkina Faso won 3–0 on aggregate.

28 November 2025 Friendly	Morocco	1–1	Burkina Faso	Marrakesh, Morocco
19:00 UTC+1	Jraïdi 45+1'		Kabré 58'	Stadium: Marrakesh Stadium

=== 2026 ===
27 February 2026 Friendly	Morocco	5–0	Burkina Faso	Rabat, Morocco
23:00 UTC+1	Mssoudy 4', 6'; Jraïdi 33', 57'; Mrabet 45'	Report		Stadium: Al Medina Stadium; Referee: Dorsaf Ganouati (Tunisia)

3 March 2026 Friendly	Morocco	1–1	Burkina Faso	Rabat, Morocco
23:00 UTC+1	Mssoudy 90+4'	Report	Kabré 80'	Stadium: Al Medina Stadium

13 April 2026 Friendly	Senegal	1–0	Burkina Faso	Dakar, Senegal
17:00 UTC+0	Pène 2'	Report		Stadium: Stade Léopold Sédar Senghor

16 April 2026 Friendly	Senegal	3–3	Burkina Faso	Dakar, Senegal
17:00 UTC+0	K. Fall 32' (pen.), 64' (pen.), 90+6'	Report	Congo 1'; Millogo 79' (pen.); Kouanda 84'	Stadium: Stade Léopold Sédar Senghor

4 June 2026 Friendly	Burkina Faso	0–0	Mali	Ouagadougou, Burkina Faso
16:00 UTC+0		Report		Stadium: Stade du 4 Août; Referee: Zouwaira Souley Sani (Niger)

7 June 2026 Friendly	Burkina Faso	2–2	Mali	Ouagadougou, Burkina Faso
16:00 UTC+0	Guira 15'; Ouoba 24'	Report	F. Diarra 10'; A. Traoré 68' (pen.)	Stadium: Stade du 4 Août

27 July 2026 WAfCON GS	Ivory Coast	4–1	Burkina Faso	Casablanca, Morocco
20:00 GMT	Rebecca Elloh 7' (pen.); Inès Konan 16', 23'; N'Sira Ouédraogo 56'	Report	Adama Congo 60'	Stadium: Larbi Zaouli Stadium; Referee: Josephine Wanjiku (Kenya)

31 July 2026 2026 Women's Africa Cup of Nations	Burkina Faso	2–1	Tanzania	Casablanca
21:00	Kabré 43'; B. Sawadogo 80'	Report (FIFA)	Mnunka 62'	Stadium: Larbi Zaouli Stadium; Referee: Yacine Samassa (Mauritania)

4 August 2026 Women's Africa Cup of Nations	Burkina Faso	0–1	South Africa	Casablanca, Morocco
		Report (FIFA)	Kgatlana 21'	Stadium: Stade Moulay Rachid

Source : global sport

== Coaching staff ==
=== Current coaching staff ===
As of 13 February 2025

Role	Name	Ref.
Head coach	(Burkina Faso) Pascal Sawadogo	
Assistant coach	(Burkina Faso) Awa Badjo Traoré	
Assistant coach	(Burkina Faso) Rachide Traoré	
Goalkeeping coach	(Burkina Faso) Harouna Bance	
Physical coach	(Burkina Faso) Aminata Sissoko	

=== Manager history ===
- (Burkina Faso) Adama Dembéle (2007–2021)
- (Burkina Faso) Pascal Sawadogo (2021–)

== Players ==
=== Current squad ===
- The following players were called up for the 2026 WAFCON matches from 26 July through 16 August 2026. . In alignment with the CAF 26-player limit, Alima Kouda and Lehna Taoko were omitted from the final

No.	Pos.	Player	Date of birth (age)	Club
1	GK	Faoziatou Ouédraogo	17 September 2004 (aged 21)	(Burkinabé Football Federation) Etincelles
2	DF	Madina Traoré	16 August 2001 (aged 24)	(Royal Moroccan Football Federation) HA Nador
3	DF	Stéphanie Sow	2 November 1995 (aged 30)	(Burkinabé Football Federation) USFA
4	FW	Diamilatou Zongo	20 June 2001 (aged 25)	(Burkinabé Football Federation) RCB
5	DF	Stéphanie Zida	29 November 2001 (aged 24)	(Burkinabé Football Federation) USFA
6	FW	Adama Congo	11 April 2004 (aged 22)	(Royal Spanish Football Federation) SE AEM
7	FW	Mouniratou Compaoré	26 November 1997 (aged 28)	(Saudi Arabian Football Federation) Al-Yarmouk
8	MF	Félicité Kafando	17 June 1996 (aged 30)	(Burkinabé Football Federation) Etincelles
9	MF	Alimata Bélem	2 September 2004 (aged 21)	(Royal Spanish Football Federation) Eibar
10	FW	Rasmata Sawadogo	1 January 2003 (aged 23)	(Turkish Football Federation) Hakkarigücü Spor
11	FW	Balkissa Sawadogo	2 October 1998 (aged 27)	(Saudi Arabian Football Federation) Al-Yarmouk
12	DF	Charlotte Millogo	14 July 1998 (aged 28)	(Burkinabé Football Federation) USFA
13	MF	Élodie Goungounga	24 March 2000 (aged 26)	(Burkinabé Football Federation) USFA
14	DF	Madinatou Rouamba	1 December 2001 (aged 24)	(Turkish Football Federation) Trabzonspor
15	MF	Adèle Kabré	30 December 2004 (aged 21)	(Chinese Football Association) Liaoning Shenbei Hefeng
16	GK	Nina Dabilgou	14 January 1996 (aged 30)	(Ivorian Football Federation) ASEC Mimosas
17	MF	Gloria Zongo	11 May 2007 (aged 19)	(Burkinabé Football Federation) Etincelles
18	FW	Juliette Nana	16 August 2000 (aged 25)	(Turkish Football Federation) Giresunspor
19	MF	Deborah Guira	6 September 2008 (aged 17)	(Burkinabé Football Federation) Etincelles
20	MF	Rabiatou Koudougou	19 April 2004 (aged 22)	(Burkinabé Football Federation) USFA
21	FW	Faridatou Tarnagda	14 September 1998 (aged 27)	(Burkinabé Football Federation) Etincelles
22	DF	Safiatou Sam	13 April 2002 (aged 24)	(Burkinabé Football Federation) Etincelles
23	GK	Aminata Korogo	28 October 1999 (aged 26)	(Burkinabé Football Federation) ASO
24	DF	Assanatou Nako	27 April 1998 (aged 28)	(Burkinabé Football Federation) USFA
25	DF	Eden Soulier	11 May 2005 (aged 21)	(Canadian Soccer Association) CS Saint-Laurent
26	MF	Judicaël Ouoba	15 December 2001 (aged 24)	(Tanzania Football Federation) Tausi

=== Recent call-ups ===
The following players have been called up to the Burkina Faso squad within the last 12 months but were not included in the current squad.

No.	Pos.	Player	Date of birth (age)	Caps	Club
	GK	Mariam Ouattara	31 March 2003 (age 23)	{{{caps}}}	(Burkina Faso) AS Douanes
	MF	Mounifatou Helbi	20 November 2005 (age 20)	{{{caps}}}	(Tanzania) Tausi FC
	FW	Fatoumata Tamboura	8 June 1999 (age 27)	{{{caps}}}	(Morocco) US Touarga
	FW	Salamata Kouanda		{{{caps}}}	(Burkina Faso) USFA

=== Previous squads ===
Africa Women Cup of Nations

- 2022 Women's Africa Cup of Nations squads
- 2026 Women's Africa Cup of Nations squads

== Records ==
Active players in bold, statistics correct as of 2020.

=== Most capped players ===
#	Player	Year(s)	Caps

=== Top goalscorers ===
#	Player	Year(s)	Goals	Caps

== Competitive record ==
=== FIFA Women's World Cup ===
FIFA Women's World Cup record
Year	Result	Matches	Wins	Draws	Losses	GF	GA
(China) 1991	did not enter						
(Sweden) 1995	did not enter						
(United States) 1999	did not enter						
(United States) 2003	did not enter						
(China) 2007	did not enter						
(Germany) 2011	did not enter						
(Canada) 2015	did not qualify						
(France) 2019	did not qualify						
(Australia) (New Zealand) 2023	did not qualify						
(Brazil) 2027	did not qualify						
(Mexico) (United States) 2031	To be determined						
(United Kingdom) 2035	To be determined						
**Total**	0/12	0	0	0	0	0	0

=== Olympic Games ===
Summer Olympics record
Year	Result	Pld	W	D*	L	GS	GA	GD
(United States) 1996	did not qualify							
(Australia) 2000	did not qualify							
(Greece) 2004	did not qualify							
(China) 2008	did not qualify							
(United Kingdom) 2012	did not qualify							
(Brazil) 2016	did not qualify							
(Japan) 2020	did not qualify							
(France) 2024	did not qualify							
Total	0/7	0	0	0	0	0	0	0

*Draws include knockout matches decided on penalty kicks.

=== Africa Women Cup of Nations ===
Africa Women Cup of Nations record
Year	Result	Matches	Wins	Draws	Losses	GF	GA	GD
1991	did not enter							
1995	did not enter							
(Nigeria) 1998	did not enter							
(South Africa) 2000	did not enter							
(Nigeria) 2002	did not enter							
(South Africa) 2004	did not enter							
(Nigeria) 2006	did not enter							
(Equatorial Guinea) 2008	did not enter							
(South Africa) 2010	did not enter							
(Equatorial Guinea) 2012	did not enter							
(Namibia) 2014	did not qualify							
(Cameroon) 2016	did not qualify							
(Ghana) 2018	did not qualify							
(Republic of the Congo) 2020	Cancelled							
(Morocco) 2022	Group stage	3	0	1	2	2	4	−2
(Morocco) 2024	Did not qualify							
(Morocco) 2026	Group stage	3	1	0	3	3	6	–3
Total	Group stage	6	1	1	4	5	10	−5

=== African Games ===
African Games record
Year	Result	Matches	Wins	Draws	Losses	GF	GA
(Nigeria) 2003	Did Not Enter						
(Algeria) 2007	Did Not Enter						
(Mozambique) 2011	Did not qualify						
(Republic of the Congo) 2015	Did not qualify						
(Morocco) 2019	See Burkina Faso women's national under-20 football team						
(Ghana) 2023	See Burkina Faso women's national under-20 football team						
Total	0/4	0	0	0	0	0	0

=== WAFU Women's Cup record ===
WAFU Zone B Women's Cup
Year	Result	Position	Pld	W	D	L	GF	GA
(Ivory Coast) 2018	Group Stage	7th	3	1	1	1	7	6
(Ivory Coast) 2019	Group Stage	7th	3	1	0	2	7	8
Total	Group Stage	1/1	3	0	0	3	1	17

== See also ==
- Sport in Burkina Faso
  - Football in Burkina Faso
    - Women's football in Burkina Faso
- Burkina Faso women's national under-20 football team
- Burkina Faso women's national under-17 football team
- Burkina Faso men's national football team
