= Juliette Nana =

Burkinabé footballer (born 2000)

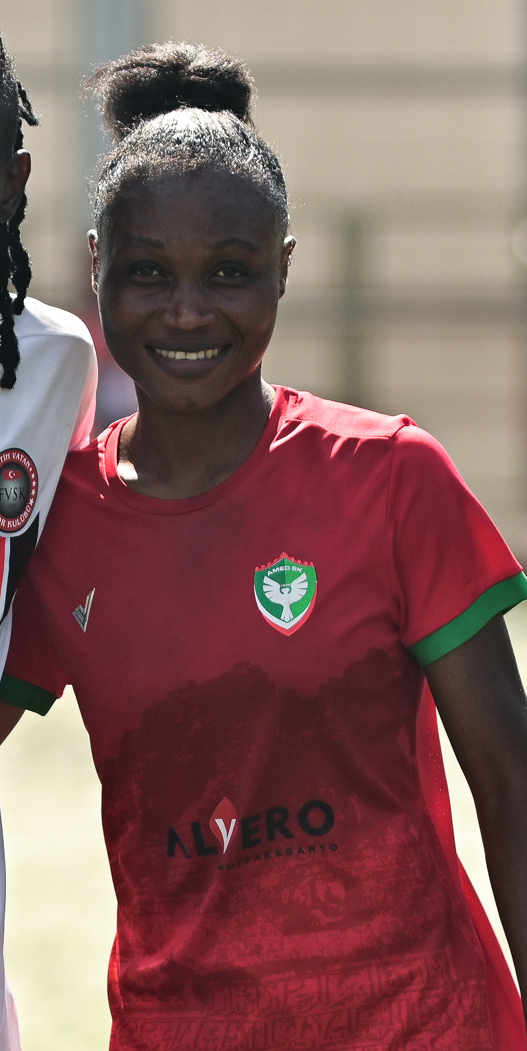

Personal information
- Full name: Juliette Nebnoma Nana
- Date of birth: 16 August 2000 (age 26)
- Place of birth: Ouagadougou, Burkina Faso
- Position: Midfielder

Team information
- Current team: Giresun Sanayı

Senior career*
Years	Team	Apps	(Gls)
2015-2017	Princesses Kadiogo	13	(17)
2017-2019	USFA	2	(2)
2020–2021	Neman Grodno	36	(24)
2022–2023	Hatay	13	(1)
2023	Hakkari	2	(1)
2023–2025	Amed	48	(11)
2025	Fatih Vatan	9	(4)
2025	Giresun sanayı	16	(5)

International career^{‡}
2022–	Burkina Faso	9	(3)
- * Club domestic league appearances and goals ‡ National team caps and goals as of

Juliette Nebnoma Nana (born 16 August 2000) is a Burkinabé women's football midfielder who plays for Giresun Sanayı in the Turkish Super League and the Burkina Faso women's national team.

== Club career ==
Nana began playing football with boys in her neighborhood around the age of seven or eight.

Nana has played for ZhFK Neman Grodno in Belarus.

In October 2022, she moved to Turkey, and signed with Hatayspor to play in the 2022–23 Super League season. In the second half of the season, she transferred to Hakkarigücü. For the 2023-24 Turkish Super League season, she joined the Diyarbakır-based club Amed.

For the 2025–26 Turkish Super League season, she transferred to Fatih Vatan in Istanbul.

== International career ==
Nana capped for Burkina Faso at senior level during the 2022 Africa Women Cup of Nations qualification).
