= 2020 Women's Africa Cup of Nations =

Cancelled 14th edition of WAFCON

Coupe d'Afrique des nations féminine de football 2020

Tournament details
- Dates: Cancelled (originally 23 November – 20 December 2020)
- Teams: 12 (planned)

The 2020 Women's Africa Cup of Nations, officially known as the 2020 Total Women's Africa Cup Of Nations for sponsorship purposes, was supposed to be the 14th edition of the biennial African women's association football tournament organized by the Confederation of African Football (CAF). This would have been the first edition to feature 12 teams at the group stages of the tournament as opposed to 8 from previous editions.

CAF decided to cancel this edition of the tournament on 30 June 2020 at an executive virtual meeting, citing "challenging conditions" caused by the COVID-19 pandemic in Africa and rather approve the creation of the CAF Women's Champions League which began in November the following year.

Nigeria were the defending champions.

== Host selection ==
The Republic of the Congo were named as the hosts on 17 September 2018, but withdrew on 10 July the following year.

No official replacement hosts were named by CAF before cancellation, although sources mentioned Tunisia, Nigeria and Equatorial Guinea as possible or potential hosts.

== Qualification ==
A total of 36 out of the 54 CAF nations entered their female national teams into the qualification rounds which were scheduled to be played in April and June 2020 before being initially postponed due to the COVID-19 pandemic in Africa and eventually cancelled.
