= WAFU Zone B Women's Cup =

- Organiser(s): WAFU
- Founded: 2018; 8 years ago
- Region: West Africa
- Teams: 8
- Current champions: Nigeria (1st title)
- Most championships: Ghana; Nigeria (1 title each)
- 2025 WAFU Zone B Women's Cup

The WAFU Zone B Women's Cup is a women's association football competition contested by national teams of Zone B of the West African Football Union.

The first edition was played in 2018 with eight teams, which included some foreign-based players.

== Inaugural Tournament (2018) ==
Eight teams were drawn in two groups of four. WAFU Zone B member teams were Ivory Coast, Niger, Burkina Faso, Ghana, Nigeria and Benin. Mali (from Zone A) replaced Benin, who had withdrawn shortly before the tournament, and Senegal (from Zone A) were invited to make the numbers up to eight. The tournament was won by Ghana.

== Tournament history ==
| Editions | Years | Hosts | Finals | | | Third place playoff | | | Number of teams |
| Editions | Years | Hosts | Winners | Scores | Runners-up | Third place | Score | Fourth place | Number of teams |
| 1 | 2018 | Ivory Coast | Ghana | 1–0 | Ivory Coast | Nigeria | 2–1 | Mali | 8 |
| 2 | 2019 | Ivory Coast | Nigeria | 1–1 (5–4 p) | Ivory Coast | Ghana | 0–0 (8–7 p) | Mali | 8 |
| 3 | 2025 | Benin (7–12 Nov) | Cancelled | | | – | | | 3 |

== Participating nations ==
Legend

- 1st – Champions
- 2nd – Runners-up
- 3rd – Third place
- 4th – Fourth place
- SF – Losing semi-finals
- QF – Quarter-finals
- GS – Group stage
- Q — Qualified for upcoming tournament
- • – Did not qualify
- × – Withdrew
- – Hosts

| Team | (Ivory Coast) 2018 | (Ivory Coast) 2019 | Years |
|---|---|---|---|
| Ivory Coast | 2nd | 2nd | 5 |
| Ghana | 1st | 3rd | 5 |
| Niger | GS | GS | 5 |
| Burkina Faso | GS | GS | 5 |
| Togo | GS | GS | 5 |
| Nigeria | 3rd | 1st | 1 |
| Benin | | | |
| Total (8 Teams) | 8 | 8 | |
