= Ghana women's national football team =

Association football team

Ghana
- Nickname: Black Queens
- Association: GFA
- Confederation: CAF (Africa)
- Sub-confederation: WAFU (West Africa)
- Head coach: Kim Björkegren
- Captain: Portia Boakye
- Most caps: Portia Boakye
- FIFA code: GHA
First colours	Second colours

FIFA ranking
- Current: 65 ▼5 (20 October 2026)
- Highest: 42 (June 2008)
- Lowest: 67 (August 2025)

First international
- Nigeria 5–1 Ghana (Lagos, Nigeria; 16 February 1991)

Biggest win
- Ghana 13–0 Guinea (Conakry, Guinea; 11 July 2004)

Biggest defeat
- Germany 11–0 Ghana (Paderborn, Germany; 22 July 2016)

World Cup
- Appearances: 3 (first in 1999)
- Best result: Group stage (1999, 2003, 2007)

Women's Africa Cup of Nations
- Appearances: 12 (first in 1991)
- Best result: Runners-up (1998, 2002, 2006)

The Ghana women's national football team represents Ghana in international women's association football and is governed by the Ghana Football Association. Its players are known as the Black Queens.

== Grounds ==
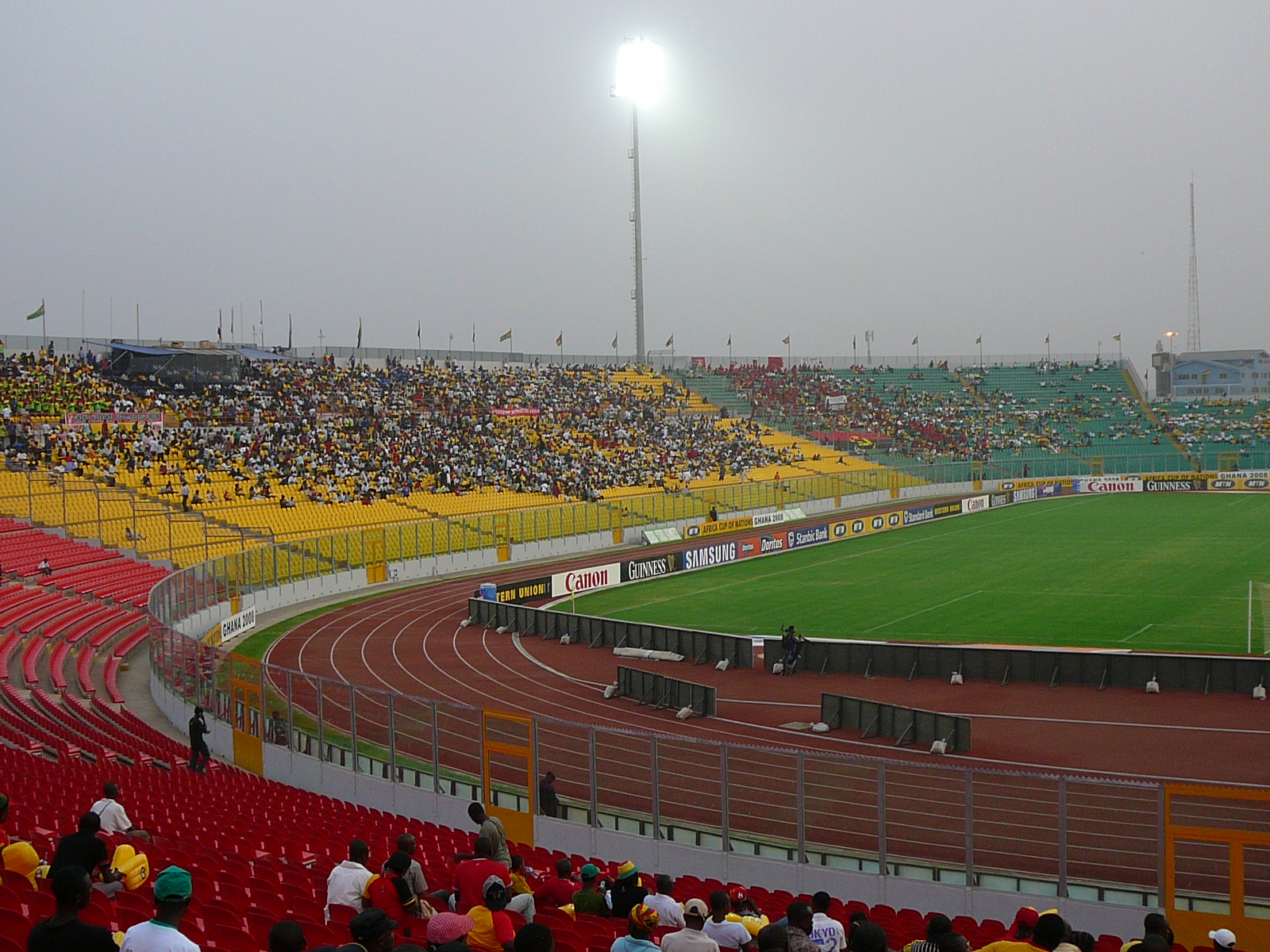
Kumasi Sports Stadium

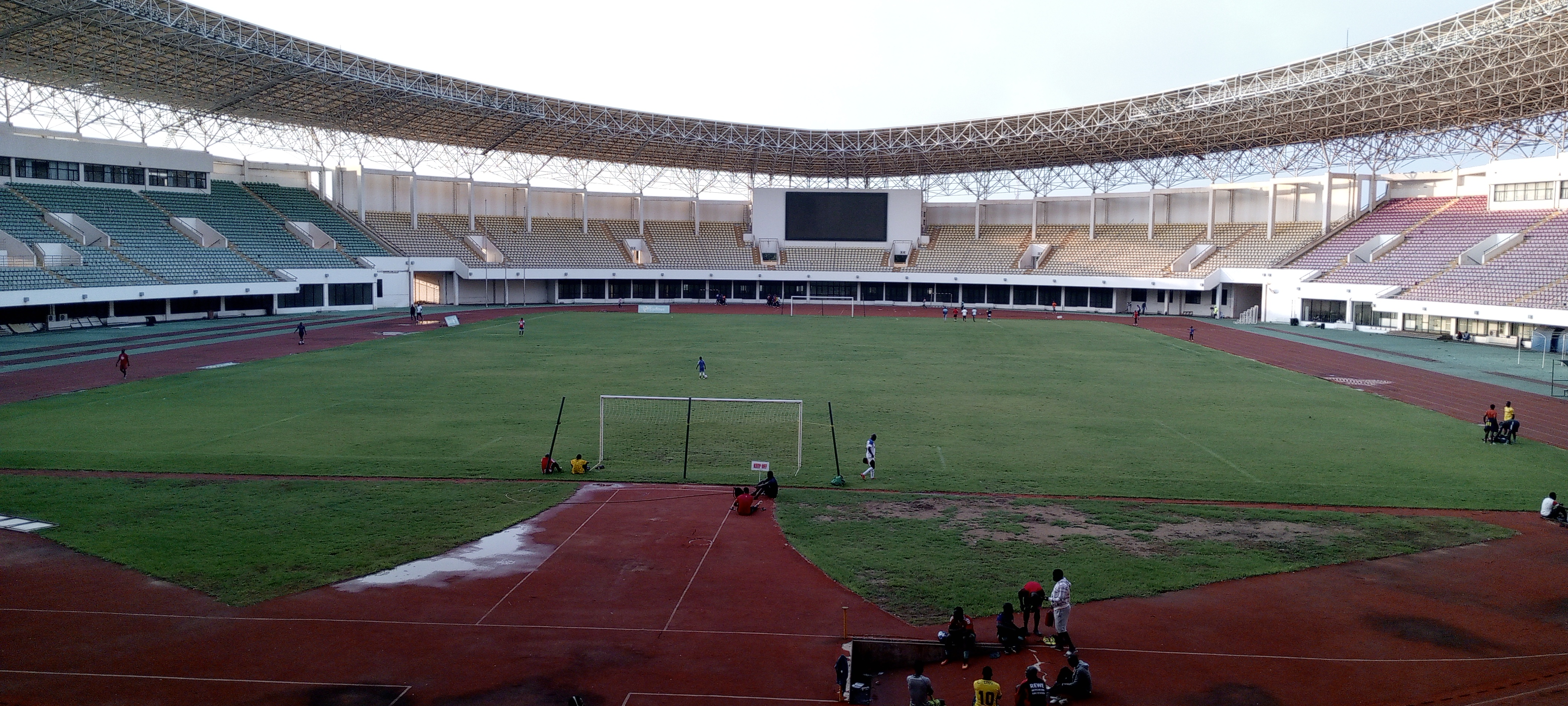
Aliu Mahama Sports Stadium

World Cup and Africa Cup of Nations qualifying matches have been played at the Essipong Stadium in Sekondi-Takoradi, Kumasi Sports Stadium in Kumasi, the Cape Coast Sports Stadium in Cape Coast, the Accra Sports Stadium in the Accra and the Tamale Stadium in Tamale.

The Black Queen's training facilities and training grounds are Ghanaman Soccer Centre of Excellence also known as the National camp site or the GFA Technical Centre (GSCE) located in Prampram.

== Rivalry ==
The Black Queens have a rivalry with the Super Falcons, the Nigeria women's national football team dating to when they played their first international match.

== Results and fixtures ==
Legend

Win Draw Loss Fixture

=== 2025 ===
23 October 2025 2026 WAFCON qualifying	Egypt	0–3	Ghana	Ismailia
18:00 UTC+2		Report (FIFA)	Boaduwaa 42'; Amponsah 85'; Asantewaa 90+2'	Stadium: Suez Canal Stadium; Referee: Akhona Makalima (South Africa)

28 October 2025 2026 WAFCON qualifying	Ghana	4–0	Egypt	Accra
15:30 UTC+0	Boaduwaa 52', 55', 90+2'; Yeboah 57'	Report (FIFA)		Stadium: Accra Sports Stadium; Referee: Antsino Twanyanyukwa (Namibia)
Note: Ghana won 7–0 on aggregate.

2 December Friendly	England	2–0	Ghana	Southampton, England
19:00 GMT	Kendall 6'; Russo 90+5' (pen.)	Report		Stadium: St Mary's Stadium; Attendance: 20,252; Referee: Lina Lehtovaara (Finland)

=== 2026 ===
28 February 2026 Pink Ladies Cup	Ghana	4–0	Hong Kong	Al Hamriyah, UAE
16:00 UTC+4	Marfo 27'; Boaduwaa 40'; Boye-Hlorkah 55'; Zakaria 87'	Report		Stadium: Al Hamriya Sports Club Stadium; Attendance: 1,000; Referee: Rawdha Almansoori (United Arab Emirates)

3 March 2026 Pink Ladies Cup	Russia	0–4	Ghana	Al Hamriyah, UAE
16:00 UTC+4		Report	Nyamekye 8'; Boaduwaa 18', 33'; Zakaria 88'	Stadium: Al Hamriya Sports Club Stadium

6 March 2026 Pink Ladies Cup	Ghana	Cancelled	Tanzania	Al Hamriyah, UAE
21:00 UTC+4				Stadium: Al Hamriya Sports Club Stadium

14 July Friendly	Ghana	1–0	Ivory Coast	Casablanca, Morocco
17:00 GMT	Sharon Sampson 75'	Report		Stadium: Père Jégo Stadium

29 July 2026 2026 WAFCON GS	Ghana	2–0	Cape Verde	Casablanca, Morocco
18:00	Boaduwaa 6'; Vieira 54' (o.g.)	Report (FIFA)		Stadium: Moulay Rachid Stadium; Referee: Zouleikha Harmasse (Morocco)

2 August 2026 WAFCON GS	Ghana	0–1	Cameroon	Casablanca, Morocco
18:00 (UTC+01:00)		Report (FIFA)	Ngah Manga 19' (pen.)	Stadium: Moulay Rachid Stadium; Referee: Shahenda El Maghrabi (Egypt)

6 August 2026 WAFCON GS	Mali	1–1	Ghana	Casablanca, Morocco
21:00 (UTC+01:00)	Diabaté 50'	Report (FIFA)	Badu 45+3'	Stadium: Moulay Rachid Stadium; Referee: Akhona Makalima (South Africa)

9 August 2026 WAFCON QF	Malawi	2–1	Ghana	Rabat, Morocco
21:00 UTC+0	Te. Chawinga 12'; Kadzere 79'	Report	Boye-Hlorkah 7'	Stadium: Al Medina Stadium; Referee: Shahenda El Maghrabi (Egypt)

13 August 2027 World Cup Qualifier	Ivory Coast	1–2	Ghana	Casablanca, Morocco
17:00 GMT	Inès Konan 4' (pen.)	Report	Princess Marfo 59'; Josephine Bonsu 72' (pen.)	Stadium: Larbi Zaouli Stadium; Referee: Akhona Makalima (South Africa)

8 October 2028 Olympic Qualification Second round	Mauritius	0–3	Ghana	Saint Pierre, Mauritius
18:30 UTC+4		Report	Kim 16'; Kusi 24'; Simon 45+3'	Stadium: Côte d'Or National Sports Complex; Referee: Sisay Raya (Ethiopia)

13 October 2028 Olympic Qualification Second round	Ghana	7–0 (10–0 agg.)	Mauritius	Accra, Ghana
16:00 UTC+0	Badu 9'; Boakye 27'; Zakaria 32'; Abdulai 74', 90+3'; Cudjoe 87' (pen.); Amoh 89'	Report		Stadium: Accra Sports Stadium; Referee: Joselyne Nsabimana (Burundi)

28 November 2027 FIFA Women's World Cup qualification	Ghana	–	Ecuador	Salé, Morocco
19:00 UTC+0				Stadium: Mohammed VI Football Academy

1 December 2027 FIFA Women's World Cup qualification	Uzbekistan	–	Ghana	Salé, Morocco
16:30 UTC+0				Stadium: Mohammed VI Football Academy

5 December 2027 FIFA Women's World Cup qualification	Papua New Guinea	–	Ghana	Salé, Morocco
17:00 UTC+0				Stadium: Mohammed VI Football Academy

== Coaching staff ==
As of January 2025

Role	Name
Head coach	(Sweden) Kim Björkegren
Assistant coach	(Ghana) Aboagye Dacosta
Assistant coach	(Ghana) Joyce Boatey-Agyei
Pysiotherapist	(Ghana) Margaret Foli
Goalkeeping coach	(Ghana) Raymond Fenny
Welfare manager	(Ghana) Anita Wiredu-Minta
Kits manager	(Ghana) Patience Quarshie
Team doctor	(Ghana) Caryn Agyeman Prempeh
Team nurse	(Ghana) Rosemary Aseidua

=== Manager history ===
- Anthony Edusei (1993)
- Jones Ofosuhene (1997)
- Emmanuel Kwasi Afranie (1998–1999)
- P.S.K. Paha (2000–2002)
- Oko Aryee (2002–)
- John Eshun (2005)
- Bashir Hayford (2005–2006, no competitive games)
- Isaac Paha 2006–2008)
- Mumuni Gamel (2008–2009)
- Anthony Edusei (2009–2011)
- Kuuku Dadzie (2011–2012)
- Yusif Basigi (2013–2017)
- Didi Dramani (2017–2018)
- Mercy Tagoe-Quarcoo (2018)
- Bashir Hayford (2018–2019)
- Mercy Tagoe-Quarcoo (2019–2023)
- Nora Häuptle (2023–2025)
- Kim Björkegren (2025–)

== Players ==
=== Current squad ===
- The following players were called up for the 2026 Women's Africa Cup of Nations.

No.	Pos.	Player	Date of birth (age)	Club
1	GK	Cynthia Konlan	29 November 2002 (age 23)	(Ghana Football Association) FC Samartex Ladies
16	GK	Afi Amenyeku	15 November 2005 (age 21)	(Albanian Football Federation) FK Apolonia Fier
22	GK	Osman Huzeimah	1 October 2005 (age 21)	(Ghana Football Association) Jonina Ladies
2	DF	Bénédicte Simon	17 June 1997 (age 29)	(Swiss Football Association) Servette FC
3	DF	Susan Ama Duah	3 February 2002 (age 24)	(Portuguese Football Federation) Racing Power FC
4	DF	Abena Anoma Opoku	1 October 2004 (age 22)	(All India Football Federation) East Bengal FC
12	DF	Anasthesia Achiaa	20 December 2003 (age 22)	(Hungarian Football Federation) ETO Győri
15	DF	Comfort Yeboah	17 December 2006 (age 19)	(Royal Spanish Football Federation) DUX Logroño
17	DF	Portia Boakye	17 April 1989 (age 37)	(Congolese Association Football Federation) TP Mazembe
19	DF	Alex Tay	1 January 2007 (age 19)	(United States Soccer Federation) Stanford University
23	DF	Josephine Bonsu	20 August 1999 (age 27)	(German Football Association) Carl Zeiss Jena
5	MF	Grace Asantewaa	5 December 2000 (age 25)	(Mexican Football Federation) Juárez
6	MF	Jennifer Cudjoe	7 March 1994 (age 32)	(United States Soccer Federation) Brooklyn FC
7	FW	Princess Marfo	2 October 2003 (age 23)	(Royal Dutch Football Association) PSV Eindhoven
8	MF	Chantelle Boye-Hlorkah	8 September 1995 (age 31)	(The Football Association) Nottingham Forest
10	FW	Princella Adubea	27 December 1998 (age 27)	(Turkish Football Federation) Yüksekova S.K.
11	FW	Alice Kusi	12 January 1995 (age 31)	(Saudi Arabian Football Federation) Al-Ahli
13	MF	Evelyn Badu	11 September 2002 (age 24)	(Canadian Soccer Association) Montreal Roses FC
15	MF	Stella Nyamekye	18 September 2005 (age 21)	(Norwegian Football Federation) SK Brann
21	FW	Linda Owusu Ansah	3 July 2006 (age 20)	(Canadian Soccer Association) AFC Toronto
24	MF	Wasiima Mohammed	22 March 2004 (age 22)	(Swiss Football Association) FC Zürich
26	FW	Sharon Sampson	14 October 2002 (age 24)	(Swedish Football Association) Piteå IF
9	FW	Doris Boaduwaa	24 December 2002 (age 23)	(Israel Football Association) Hapoel Katamon
20	FW	Ajegipina Zakaria	24 August 2005 (age 21)	(Ghana Football Association) Ampem Darkoa
25	FW	Abi Kim	19 July 1998 (age 28)	(Turkish Football Federation) Trabzonspor

(Players listed by position then kit number, wingers marked as 'fw' midfielders. Updated 29 July 2026.)

=== Recent call-ups ===
The following players have been called up to a Ghana squad in the past 12 months.

Pos.	Player	Date of birth (age)	Caps	Goals	Club	Latest call-up
GK	Afi Amenyeku	15 November 2005 (age 21)			(Albania) FK Apolonia Fier	v. Egypt,28 October 2025
MF	Sarah Nyarko	—			(Ghana) Dreamz Ladies F.C.	v. Egypt,28 October 2025
MF	Grace Asantewaa	5 December 2000 (age 25)			(Mexico) Juárez	v. Egypt,28 October 2025
MF	Jennifer Cudjoe	7 March 1994 (age 32)			(United States) DC Power	v. Egypt,28 October 2025
MF	Evelyn Badu	11 September 2002 (age 24)			(Norway) Molde	v. Egypt,28 October 2025
MF	Nancy Amoh	18 September 2005 (age 21)			(Ghana) Ampem Darkoa	v. Egypt,28 October 2025
FW	Abigail Appiah	—			Unspecified	v. Egypt,28 October 2025
Notes: PRE: Preliminary squad

=== Other players ===
- Alberta Sackey – 2002 African Women Player of the Year
- Adjoa Bayor – 2003 African Women Player of the Year

=== Captains ===
- Alberta Sackey (199?–2003)
- Memunatu Sulemana (2003–2006)
- Adjoa Bayor (2006–2010)
- Florence Okoe (2010–2012)
- Leticia Zikpi (2012–2014) General Captain (2018)
- Elizabeth Addo (2016–)

== Tournament record ==
=== FIFA Women's World Cup ===
FIFA Women's World Cup record
Year	Round	Position	Pld	W	D	L	GF	GA	Squad
(China) 1991	Did not qualify								
(Sweden) 1995	Did not qualify								
(United States) 1999	Group stage	13th	3	0	1	2	1	10	Squad
(United States) 2003	Group stage	12th	3	1	0	2	2	5	Squad
(China) 2007	Group stage	15th	3	0	0	3	3	15	Squad
(Germany) 2011	Did not qualify								
(Canada) 2015	Did not qualify								
(France) 2019	Did not qualify								
(Australia) (New Zealand) 2023	Did not qualify								
(Brazil) 2027	To be determined in 2027 FIFA Women's World Cup qualification (inter-confederation play-offs)								
(Mexico) (United States) 2031	To be determined								
(United Kingdom) 2035	To be determined								
Total:3/10	Group Stage	12th	9	1	1	7	6	30	

FIFA Women's World Cup history
Year	Round	Date	Opponent	Result	Stadium
(United States) 1999	Group stage	20 June	Australia	D 1–1	Foxboro Stadium, Foxborough
(United States) 1999	Group stage	23 June	China	L 0–7	Civic Stadium, Portland
(United States) 1999	Group stage	26 June	Sweden	L 0–2	Soldier Field, Chicago
(United States) 2003	Group stage	21 September	China	L 0–1	The Home Depot Center, Carson
(United States) 2003	Group stage	25 September	Russia	L 0–3	The Home Depot Center, Carson
(United States) 2003	Group stage	28 September	Australia	W 2–1	PGE Park, Portland
(China) 2007	Group stage	12 September	Australia	L 1–4	Yellow Dragon Sports Center, Hangzhou
(China) 2007	Group stage	15 September	Canada	L 0–4	Yellow Dragon Sports Center, Hangzhou
(China) 2007	Group stage	20 September	Norway	L 2–7	Yellow Dragon Sports Center, Hangzhou

=== Olympic Games ===
Olympic Games record
Year	Round	Position	Pld	W	D*	L	GF	GA	Squad
(United States) 1996	Africa not eligible								
(Australia) 2000	Did not qualify								
(Greece) 2004	Did not qualify								
(China) 2008	Did not qualify								
(United Kingdom) 2012	Did not qualify								
(Brazil) 2016	Did not qualify								
(Japan) 2020	Did not qualify								
(France) 2024	Did not qualify								
(United States) 2028	To be determined								
Total									

=== Women's Africa Cup of Nations ===
Women's Africa Cup of Nations record
Year	Round	Position	Pld	W	D	L	GF	GA	Squad
1991	Quarter-finals	5th	2	0	0	2	2	7	Squad
1995	Semi-finals	4th	2	0	0	2	0	5	Squad
(Nigeria) 1998	Runners-up	2nd	4	3	0	1	11	4	Squad
(South Africa) 2000	Third place	3rd	5	3	1	1	13	6	Squad
(Nigeria) 2002	Runners-up	2nd	5	4	0	1	9	4	Squad
(South Africa) 2004	Third place	3rd	5	3	1	1	7	2	Squad
(Nigeria) 2006	Runners-up	2nd	5	4	0	1	7	3	Squad
(Equatorial Guinea) 2008	Group stage	5th	3	1	1	1	4	4	Squad
(South Africa) 2010	Group stage	5th	3	1	0	2	4	6	Squad
(Equatorial Guinea) 2012	Did not qualify								
(Namibia) 2014	Group stage	5th	3	1	1	1	2	2	Squad
(Cameroon) 2016	Third place	3rd	5	3	1	1	8	4	Squad
(Ghana) 2018	Group stage	6th	3	1	1	1	3	3	Squad
(Republic of the Congo) 2020	Cancelled								
(Morocco) 2022	Did not qualify								
(Morocco) 2024	Third place	3rd	6	1	4	1	7	6	Squad
(Morocco) 2026	Quarter-final	5th	5	2	1	2	6	5	Squad
Total	Runners-up	14/16	56	27	11	18	83	61	

*Draws include knockout matches decided on penalty kicks.

=== African Games ===
African Games record
Year	Round	Position	Pld	W	D	L	GF	GA
(Nigeria) 2003	Did not enter							
(Algeria) 2007	Did not enter							
(Mozambique) 2011	Did not enter							
(Republic of the Congo) 2015	Gold medalist	1st	4	2	2	0	3	1
(Morocco) 2019	See Ghana women's national under-20 football team							
(Ghana) 2023	See Ghana women's national under-20 football team							
Total	1 Title	1/4	4	2	2	0	3	1

- 2019 and 2023 editions of the football tournament was played by the U-20 team.

=== WAFU Women's Cup ===
WAFU Zone B Women's Cup record
Year	Round	Position	Pld	W	D	L	GF	GA
(Ivory Coast) 2018	Champions	1st	4	2	1	1	15	3
(Ivory Coast) 2019	Third place	3rd	5	2	3	0	8	0
Total	1 Title	2/2	3	0	0	3	1	17
