= Robert Champroux Stadium =

Sports stadium in Abidjan, Ivory Coast

Coordinates: 5°18′19″N 3°59′32″W

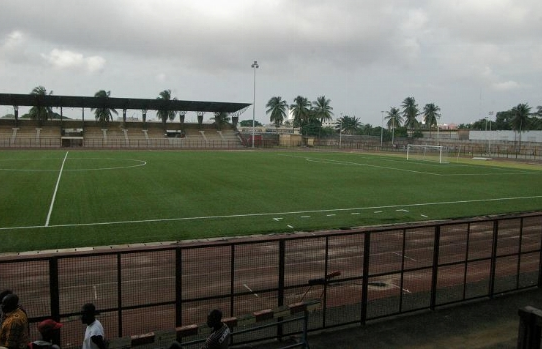
The stadium in 2007

Robert Champroux Stadium (French: Stade Robert Champroux) is a multi-use stadium in Marcory, a suburb of Abidjan, Ivory Coast. It is currently used mostly for association football matches, serving the home ground of Jeunesse Club d'Abidjan and Stella Club d'Adjamé. The stadium has a capacity of 10,000. Rugby union club Treichville Biafra Olympique (TBO) sometimes use the stadium for matches.

== Architecture and features ==
Designed by a team of talented architects and engineers from Ivory Coast, the stadium's design emphasizes functionality, aesthetics, and spectator comfort. Notable features include an intricate roofing system that provides shade and protection, ergonomic seating arrangements, and state-of-the-art technology, including high-definition screens and sound systems.

== Facilities ==
Stade Robert Champroux offers various seating options, including general seating areas, premium seating, and private boxes. Facilities within the stadium include concession stands, restrooms, shops for merchandise, and accessibility features for disabled spectators.
