= Niger women's national football team =

Women's national association football team representing Niger

Niger
- Association: Nigerien Football Federation
- Confederation: CAF (Africa)
- Sub-confederation: WAFU (West Africa)
- Head coach: Ali Mamadou
- FIFA code: NIG
First colours	Second colours

FIFA ranking
- Current: 174 (21 April 2026)
- Highest: 161 (December 2021 – June 2022)
- Lowest: 174 (December 2025)

First international
- Niger 0–10 Burkina Faso (Ouagadougou, Burkina Faso; 2 September 2007)

Biggest defeat
- Nigeria 15–0 Niger (Côte d'Ivoire; 11 April 2019)

The Niger women's national football team represents Niger in international women's football. It is governed by the Nigerien Football Federation. It has played in four FIFA-recognised matches, two of which were losses to Burkina Faso women's national football team in 2007. There is an under-20 women's national team who were supposed to participate in the 2002 African Women U-19 Championship but withdrew before playing a game. Some problems impact the development of the women's game in Africa that effect Niger of which sexism, abuse, homophobia, religion and financial setbacks have been huge factors.

== Team image background ==
=== Human rights and development ===
Early development of the women's game at the time colonial powers brought football to the continent was limited as colonial powers in the region tended to take male concepts of patriarchy and women's participation in sport with them to local cultures that had similar concepts already embedded in them. The lack of later development of the national team on a wider international level symptomatic of all African teams is a result of several factors, including limited access to education, poverty amongst women in the wider society, and fundamental inequality present in the society that occasionally allows for female-specific human rights abuses. When quality female football players are developed, they tend to leave for greater opportunities abroad. Continent-wide, funding is also an issue, with most development money coming from FIFA, not the National Football Association. Future, success for women's football in Africa is dependent on improved facilities and access by women to these facilities. Attempting to commercialize the game and make it commercially viable is not the solution, as demonstrated by the current existence of many youth and women's football camps held throughout the continent.

The Nigerien Football Federation was founded in 1967 and became a FIFA affiliate that same year. The FIFA trigramme is NIG. The national association does not have a full-time staffer dedicated to women, and there are no organizational or constitutional provisions specifically about the women's game.

No organized women's football program existed in the country despite football being one of the most popular sports in the country by 2009. For women though, basketball is the most popular participation sport. In 2006, there were zero registered female players and zero registered football clubs for women only. Rights to broadcast the 2011 Women's World Cup in the country were bought by the African Union of Broadcasting and Supersport International.

=== Team ===
Niger officially had no women's national senior A team before 2006 and only had their first FIFA-recognised international in 2007 when they competed at the Tournoi de Cinq Nations held in Ouagadougou. On 2 September, they lost to Burkina Faso 0–10. On 6 September, they lost to Burkina Faso 0–5. The country did not have a team competing in the 2010 African Women's Championships during the preliminary rounds or the 2011 All Africa Games. In June 2012, the team was not ranked in the world by FIFA. The country has never been ranked by FIFA.

The country has had a Niger women's national under-19 football team who have competed in the 2002 African Women U-19 Championship, the first edition of the competition to be held. They had a bye in the first round. In the quarterfinals, they were supposed to play Morocco but Niger withdrew from the competition.

== Results and fixtures ==
The following is a list of match results in the last 12 months, as well as any future matches that have been scheduled.

Legend

Win Draw Lose Fixture

== Coaching staff ==
=== Current coaching staff ===
Role	Name	Ref.
Head coach	(Niger) Ali Badje Mamadou	

=== Managerial history ===
(Niger) Ali Badje Mamadou(20??–present)

== Players ==
=== Current squad ===
The following 22 players were called up for the 2026 Women's Africa Cup of Nations qualification matches against Gambia on 19 and 24 February 2025.

No.	Pos.	Player	Date of birth (age)	Club
16	GK	Khadidja Ousmane		(Nigerien Football Federation) AS Police
1	GK	Oumeyra Issoufou		(Nigerien Football Federation) Atcha Académie
22	GK	Assamaou Moussa		(Nigerien Football Federation) Atcha Académie
2	DF	Aichatou Hamed Alhassane		(Nigerien Football Federation) AS GNN
3	DF	Faouzia Ahmed Sidi		(Nigerien Football Federation) AS FAN
4	DF	Pascaline Zeinab Ezin		(Nigerien Football Federation) Atcha Académie
5	DF	Samira Adamou Samna		(Nigerien Football Federation) Atcha Académie
18	DF	Falmata Mamadou		(Burkinabé Football Federation) AS Douanes
	DF	Nana Hadiza Souley		(Nigerien Football Federation) AS GNN
	DF	Zoubeina Moudi		(Nigerien Football Federation) AS GNN
6	MF	Roukaya Yacouba		(Nigerien Football Federation) AS GNN
14	MF	Nana Farida Illa		(Nigerien Football Federation) Awaf
15	MF	Firdaws Zakari		(Nigerien Football Federation) Wadrae
20	MF	Dicko Abdoulaye Traoré		(Nigerien Football Federation) Atcha Académie
	MF	Faouzia Boubacar		(Nigerien Football Federation) AS GNN
	MF	Kadi Hama		(Nigerien Football Federation) AS Police
7	FW	Saadia Lawali		(Nigerien Football Federation) AS Police
10	FW	Rahina Moussa (captain)		(Nigerien Football Federation) AS GNN
11	FW	Zeinabou Zakou		(Nigerien Football Federation) AS GNN
8	FW	Rakiatou Oumarou Bongo		(Nigerien Football Federation) Wadrae
	FW	Naima Moustapha Hanjar		(Nigerien Football Federation) AS GNN
9	FW	Aichatou Abdourahaman		(Nigerien Football Federation) AS Police
12	FW	Soraya A. Kader		

=== Recent call-ups ===
The following players have been called up to a Niger squad in the past 12 months.

Pos.	Player	Date of birth (age)	Caps	Goals	Club	Latest call-up

== Records ==
*Active players in bold, statistics correct as of 26 October 2021.

=== Most capped players ===
#	Player	Year(s)	Caps

=== Top goalscorers ===
#	Player	Year(s)	Goals	Caps

== Competitive record ==
=== FIFA Women's World Cup ===
FIFA Women's World Cup record
Year	Round	GP	W	D*	L	GS	GA	GD
(China) 1991 to (Canada) 2015	Did not exist							
(France) 2019	Did not enter							
(Australia) (New Zealand) 2023	Did not qualify							
(Brazil) 2027	To be determined							
**Total**	0/2	0	0	0	0	0	0	0

*Draws include knockout matches decided on penalty kicks.

=== Olympic Games ===
Summer Olympics
Year	Result	Matches	Wins	Draws	Losses	GF	GA
(United States) 1996	Did Not Enter						
(Australia) 2000	Did Not Enter						
(Greece) 2004	Did Not Enter						
(China) 2008	Withdrew						
(United Kingdom) 2012	Did Not Enter						
(Brazil) 2016	Did Not Enter						
(Japan) 2021	Did Not Enter						
(France) 2024	Did Not Enter						
Total	0/8	0	0	0	0	0	0

=== Women's Africa Cup of Nations ===
Women's Africa Cup of Nations
Year	Round	GP	W	D*	L	GS	GA	GD
1991 to (Namibia) 2014	Did not exist							
(Cameroon) 2016 to (Ghana) 2018	Did not enter							
2020	Cancelled due to COVID-19 pandemic in Africa							
(Morocco) 2022	Did not qualify							
(Morocco) 2024	Did not qualify							
**Total**	0/3	0	0	0	0	0	0	0

*Draws include knockout matches decided on penalty kicks.

=== African Games ===
African Games
Year	Result	Matches	Wins	Draws	Losses	GF	GA
(Nigeria) 2003	Did Not Enter						
(Algeria) 2007	Did Not Enter						
(Mozambique) 2011	Did Not Enter						
(Republic of the Congo) 2015	Did Not Enter						
(Morocco) 2019	Did Not Enter						
(Ghana) 2023	Did Not Enter						
Total	0/6	0	0	0	0	0	0

=== WAFU Women's Cup record ===
WAFU Zone B Women's Cup
Year	Result	Position	Pld	W	D	L	GF	GA
(Ivory Coast) 2018	Group Stage	7th	3	0	0	3	1	20
(Ivory Coast) 2019	Group Stage	7th	3	0	0	3	0	32
Total	Group Stage	1/1	3	0	0	3	1	17

== See also ==
- Sport in Niger
  - Football in Niger
    - Women's football in Niger
- Niger men's national football team
