= Mali women's national football team results =

This article lists the results and fixtures for the Mali women's national football team.

Nicknamed "Les Aigles Dames", in reference to the men's team known as "the Eagles", the Mali women's national football team represents Mali in international women's association football. It is governed by the Malian Football Federation (FEMAFOOT) and competes under the auspices of the Confederation of African Football (CAF), as well as in regional competitions organized by the West African Football Union (WAFU) and global tournaments sanctioned by FIFA.

Established in 1998, the team played its first international match against Côte d'Ivoire on 10 August 2002, which ended in a 3–3 draw as part of the 2010 African Women's Championship qualification. With three more consecutive draws, Mali secured qualification for the continental tournament in their first attempt. However, the team did not record its first victory until 10 October 2003, when it defeated Algeria 3–0 during the All-Africa Games.

In terms of records, Mali's largest win came against neighbouring Niger with a 12–0 victory at the 2019 WAFU Zone B Women's Cup, while its heaviest defeat was an 8–0 loss to Nigeria in the 2015 African Games qualifiers four years earlier.

== Record per opponent ==
As of the match played on 17 April 2026 against Morocco
Key

Positive balance (more wins than losses)
Neutral balance (as many wins as losses)
Negative balance (more losses than wins)

The following table shows Mali's all-time official international record per opponent:

Opponent	Pld	W	D	L	GF	GA	GD	PPG	Confederation	Last
Algeria	7	2	2	3	10	15	−5	1.14	CAF	2018
Benin	2	2	0	0	4	1	+3	3.00	CAF	2006
Botswana	1	0	0	1	0	1	−1	0.00	CAF	2024
Burkina Faso	6	4	2	0	17	9	+8	2.33	CAF	2023
Cameroon	10	0	2	8	6	20	−14	0.20	CAF	2018
Cape Verde	3	2	0	1	7	4	+3	2.00	CAF	2025
Central African Republic	2	2	0	0	10	1	+9	3.00	CAF	2023
Congo	1	0	0	1	0	1	−1	0.00	CAF	2008
DR Congo	2	1	1	0	3	2	+1	2.00	CAF	2006
Equatorial Guinea	3	0	1	2	3	5	−2	0.33	CAF	2016
Ethiopia	1	0	1	0	2	2	±0	1.00	CAF	2002
Gabon	2	2	0	0	10	1	+9	3.00	CAF	2025
Gambia	3	3	0	0	11	2	+9	3.00	CAF	2020
Ghana	8	1	2	5	4	16	−12	0.62	CAF	2025
Guinea	8	6	1	1	28	6	+22	2.38	CAF	2023
Guinea-Bissau	2	2	0	0	6	1	+5	3.00	CAF	2025
Ivory Coast	13	2	6	5	16	21	−5	0.92	CAF	2019
Kenya	1	1	0	0	3	1	+2	3.00	CAF	2016
Liberia	3	1	1	1	4	2	+2	1.33	CAF	2025
Mauritania	1	1	0	0	5	0	+5	3.00	CAF	2025
Morocco	14	4	6	4	17	16	+1	1.29	CAF	2026
Niger	1	1	0	0	12	0	+12	3.00	CAF	2019
Nigeria	11	0	1	10	4	38	−34	0.09	CAF	2021
Senegal	6	3	0	3	4	8	−4	1.50	CAF	2022
Seychelles	1	1	0	0	9	0	+9	3.00	CAF	2024
Sierra Leone	1	0	0	1	0	1	−1	0.00	CAF	2025
South Africa	5	0	1	4	2	14	−12	0.20	CAF	2025
Tanzania	3	2	1	0	6	4	+2	2.33	CAF	2025
Togo	1	1	0	0	8	0	+8	3.00	CAF	2018
Tunisia	2	1	0	1	3	4	−1	1.50	CAF	2008
Zambia	1	0	1	0	1	1	±0	1.00	CAF	2025
Total	125	45	29	51	215	197	+18	1.31	—	

== Results ==
This section lists the results of les Aigles Dames in international matches against other FIFA member associations' senior women's national teams.

=== 2002 ===
10 August 2002 African Championship qualiying	Ivory Coast	3–3	Mali	Abidjan, Ivory Coast
	Bancouly 27', 71'; Koudougnon 48'	Report	Maic. Konaté 7', 45'; N'Diaye 74'	Referee: Fatou Gaye (Senegal)

24 August 2002 African Championship qualiying	Mali	1–1	Ivory Coast	Bamako, Mali
	N'Diaye 59'	Report	Bancouly 35'	Referee: Abidoye Bola (Nigeria)

22 September 2002 African Championship qualiying	Mali	0–0	Morocco	Bamako, Mali
		Report		Referee: Fati Babatchene (Benin)

11 October 2002 African Championship qualiying	Morocco	0–0 (4–5 p)	Mali	Rabat, Morocco
		Report		Referee: Fatou Gaye (Senegal)

7 December 2002 African Championship GS	Mali	0–2	Ghana	Warri, Nigeria
14:30 GMT		Report	Sackey 55'; Dgajmah 78'	Stadium: Warri Township Stadium; Referee: Xonam Agboyi (Togo)

10 December 2002 African Championship GS	Ethiopia	2–2	Mali	Warri, Nigeria
12:30 GMT	Aawasso 61', 69'	Report	Maic. Konaté 20'; Samaké 43'	Stadium: Warri Township Stadium; Referee: Mukulu Mbula (Congo DR)

13 December 2002 African Championship GS	Nigeria	5–1	Mali	Warri, Nigeria
14:30 GMT	Akide 38'; Nkwocha 40', 72'; Iweta 50'; Chiejine 83'	Report	Samaké 58'	Stadium: Warri Township Stadium; Referee: Xonam Agboyi (Togo)

=== 2003 ===
4 October 2003 All-Africa Games GS	South Africa	2–0	Mali	Kaduna, Nigeria

7 October 2003 All-Africa Games GS	Mali	0–0	DR Congo	Kaduna, Nigeria

10 October 2003 All-Africa Games GS	Algeria	0–3	Mali	Kaduna, Nigeria

12 October 2003 All-Africa Games SF	Nigeria	3–1	Mali	Kaduna, Nigeria

15 October 2003 All-Africa Games 3rd place	Mali	0–1	Cameroon	Kaduna, Nigeria

=== 2004 ===
11 July 2004 African Championship qualfiying	Mali	2–2	Algeria	Bamako, Mali
	N'Diaye 45'; Camara 71'	Report	Zerrouki 26', 58'	Referee: Aïssatou Kéita (Guinea)

23 July 2004 African Championship qualfiying	Algeria	1–0	Mali	Blida, Algeria
	Zerrouki 15'	Report		Stadium: Stade Mustapha Tchaker; Referee: Fatou Gaye (Senegal)

19 September 2004 African Championship GS	Cameroon	2–2	Mali	Germiston, South Africa
	Mete 18'; Mbida 60'	Report	F. Diarra 29'; Keïta 34'	Stadium: Germiston Stadium

22 September 2004 African Championship GS	Algeria	3–0	Mali	Germiston, South Africa
	Sedhane 10'; Imloul 11'; Laouadi 46'	Report		Stadium: Germiston Stadium

25 September 2004 African Championship GS	Nigeria	3–0	Mali	Pretoria, South Africa
	Uwak 7'; Nkwocha 33', 48'	Report		Stadium: Caledonian Stadium

=== 2005 ===
16 May 2005 Tournoi de Solidarite	Senegal	4–1	Mali	Dakar, Senegal
		Report		Stadium: Stade Iba Mar Diop

18 May 2005 Tournoi de Solidarite	Mali	6–1	Ivory Coast	Dakar, Senegal
		Report		Stadium: Stade Iba Mar Diop

22 May 2005 Tournoi de Solidarite F	Senegal	0–1	Mali	Dakar, Senegal
		Report	Doumbia 9'	Stadium: Stade Iba Mar Diop

=== 2006 ===
11 March 2006 African Championship qualifying	Morocco	0–2	Mali	Rabat, Morocco
		Report	N'Diaye 60'; Samaké 75'	Stadium: Stade de FUS

25 March 2006 African Championship qualifying	Mali	4–1	Morocco	Bamako, Mali
	N'Diaye 2'; Coulibaly 4', 67'; F. Diarra 47'	Report	Griba 52'	Stadium: Stade Modibo Kéïta

22 July 2006 African Championship qualifying	Mali	3–1	Benin	Bamako, Mali
	Doumbia 45'; F. Diarra 51'; N'Diaye 65'	Report	Bathily 90'	Stadium: Stade Modibo Kéïta

6 August 2006 African Championship qualifying	Benin	0–1	Mali	Cotonou, Benin
		Report	N'Diaye 48'

29 October 2006 African Championship GS	Mali	0–1	Ghana	Oghara, Nigeria
15:00 GMT		Report	Tahiru 50'	Stadium: Oghara Township Stadium

1 November 2006 African Championship GS	DR Congo	2–3	Mali	Oghara, Nigeria
13:00 GMT	Zuma 28'; Mafuta 85'	Report	Doumbia 35'; F. Diarra 68', 90'	Stadium: Oghara Township Stadium

4 November 2006 African Championship GS	Cameroon	2–0	Mali	Warri, Nigeria
15:00 GMT	Bekombo 43'; Ngo Ndoumbouk 77'	Report		Stadium: Warri Stadium

=== 2007 ===
2 September 2007 WAFU-UFOA Tournament	Ivory Coast	1–1	Mali	Ouagadougou, Burkina Faso
	Akaffou 65'	Report	F. Diarra 54'	Stadium: Stade du 4 Août

6 September 2007 WAFU-UFOA Tournament	Ivory Coast	1–2	Mali	Ouagadougou, Burkina Faso
16:00 GMT		Report		Stadium: Stade du 4 Août

9 September 2007 WAFU-UFOA Tournament	Burkina Faso	2–4	Mali	Ouagadougou, Burkina Faso
	Sana 54'; S. Simporé 90'	Report	Samaké 15'; Doumbia 25' (pen.); Coulibaly 31'; Diarra 52'	Stadium: Stade du 4 Août

=== 2008 ===
24 February 2008 African Championship qualifying	Guinea	0–8	Mali	Conakry, Guinea
		Report	Samaké 20', 54'; N'Diaye 28', 66'; Diabaté 45'; Touré 68', 70'; Diarra 76'	Stadium: Stade du 28 Septembre

8 March 2008 African Championship qualifying	Mali	3–0	Guinea	Bamako, Mali
	Diarra 26'; Coulibaly 65'; Touré 79'	Report		Stadium: Stade Modibo Kéïta

31 August Friendly	Mali	3–1	Tunisia	Bamako, Mali
	Samaké 33'; Doumbia 66'; Touré 83'		Guedri 90'	Stadium: Stade Modibo Kéïta

23 October Friendly	Tunisia	3–0	Mali	Tunisia

15 November 2008 African Championship GS	Mali	0–1	Congo	Malabo, Equatorial Guinea
		Report	Passou Ndiaye 69'	Stadium: Estadio Internacional

18 November 2008 African Championship GS	Cameroon	2–1	Mali	Malabo, Equatorial Guinea
	Bekombo 38'; Ngo Ndoumbouk 90+3'	Report	Doumbia 75' (pen.)	Stadium: Estadio Internacional

21 November 2008 African Championship GS	Equatorial Guinea	2–1	Mali	Malabo, Equatorial Guinea
	Chinasa 18'; Añonman 88'	Report	K. Diarra 30'	Stadium: Estadio Internacional

=== 2010 ===
23 May 2010 African Championship qualifying	Guinea	0–2	Mali	Conakry, Guinea
15:00 GMT		Report		Stadium: Stade du 28 Septembre; Referee: Mercy Tagoe-Quarcoo (Ghana)

5 June 2010 African Championship qualifying	Mali	1–2	Guinea	Bamako, Mali
		Report		Referee: Felicia Chibuogu (Nigeria)

9 October Friendly	South Africa	2–2	Mali	Thembisa, South Africa
	Matlou 4', 17'	Report	K. Traoré 37'; N'Diaye 62'	Stadium: Makhulong Stadium

1 November 2010 African Championship GS	Nigeria	5–0	Mali	Daveyton, South Africa
13:30 GMT	Nkwocha 15', 16', 42'; Mbachu 70'; Ordega 84'	Report		Stadium: Sinaba Stadium; Referee: Thérèse Sagno (Guinea)

4 November 2010 African Championship GS	Mali	3–2	Tanzania	Daveyton, South Africa
13:30 GMT	Konate 25'; F. Diarra 31'; N'Diaye 67'	Report	Mwasikili 30'; Swalehe 32'	Stadium: Sinaba Stadium; Referee: Patricia Obiang (Gabon)

7 November 2010 African Championship GS	South Africa	4–0	Mali	Daveyton, South Africa
13:30 GMT	Dlamini 32', 76', 90'; Seoposenwe 84'	Report		Stadium: Sinaba Stadium; Referee: Fadouma Dia (Senegal)

=== 2011 ===
15 January 2012 Summer Olympics qualifying	Cameroon	5–0	Mali	Yaoundé, Cameroon
	Nchout 13'; Onguéné 27'; Bella 40'; Manie 67'; Zouga 80'	Report

29 January 2012 Summer Olympics qualifying	Mali	0–1	Cameroon	Bamako, Mali
		Report	Manie 10'

=== 2012 ===
15 January 2010 African Championship qualifying	Mali	0–3	Ghana	Bamako, Mali
		Report	Ibrahim 14'; Myles 61'; Zikpi 82'	Stadium: Stade Modibo Keïta

29 January 2010 African Championship qualifying	Ghana	5–0	Mali	Accra, Ghana
	Boakye 21', 53'; Abdul Rahman 42', 47'; Okoe 74'	Report		Stadium: Accra Sports Stadium

=== 2014 ===
15 February 2014 African Championship qualifying	Ivory Coast	4–0	Mali	Abidjan, Ivory Coast
15:30 GMT	Gnago 5' (pen.); Nahi 72'; Nrehy 80'; Elloh 85'	Report		Stadium: Robert Champroux Stadium; Referee: Monia Bedoui (Tunisia)

28 February 2014 African Championship qualifying	Mali	0–1	Ivory Coast	Bamako, Mali
17:00 GMT		Report	Nrehy 60'	Stadium: Stade Modibo Keïta; Referee: Leopoldina Ross (Guinea-Bissau)

=== 2015 ===
21 March 2015 African Games qualifying	Mali	1–1	Nigeria	Bamako, Mali
17:00 GMT	Tangara 83'	Report	Okobi 52'	Stadium: Stade Modibo Kéïta; Referee: Fatou Thioune (Senegal)

10 April 2015 African Games qualifying	Nigeria	8–0	Mali	Abuja, Nigeria
15:00 GMT	Oparanozie 3', 45+2'; Ordega 19', 62'; Oshoala 36', 47'; Nwabuoku 69'; Sunday 71'	Report		Stadium: National Stadium; Referee: Joyce Appiah (Ghana)

=== 2016 ===
12 January Friendly	Mali	5–2	Burkina Faso	Bamako, Mali
	Tangara 29', 44'; F. Diarra 35', 58'; Koné 60' (pen.)	Report	Poda 57'; S. Simporé 62'	Stadium: Stade Mamadou Konaté

14 January Friendly	Mali	2–2	Burkina Faso	Bamako, Mali
	Tangara 31'; Koné 36'	Report	S. Simporé 3'; B. Simporé 44'	Stadium: Stade Mamadou Konaté

2 February Friendly	Algeria	2–2	Mali	Algiers, Algeria
14:00 GMT	Guellati 6'; Bekhedda 21'	Report	Tangara 55', 61'	Stadium: Stade Communal de Baraki

5 February Friendly	Algeria	5–0	Mali	Algiers, Algeria
14:00 GMT	Bouhani (?); Bara (?); Affak (?)	Report		Stadium: FAF National Technical Centre

5 March 2016 WAFCON qualifying	Mali	0–0	Morocco	Bamako, Mali
16:30 GMT		Report		Stadium: Stade Modibo Kéïta; Referee: Christine Ziga (Ghana)

19 March 2016 WAFCON qualifying	Morocco	1–2	Mali	Salé, Morocco
	Jraïdi 4'	Report	D. Baradji 30'; B. Diarra 75'	Stadium: Stade Boubker Ammar; Referee: Fatou Thioune (Senegal)

6 April 2016 WAFCON qualifying	Mali	1–1	Equatorial Guinea	Bamako, Mali
17:00 GMT	B. Diarra 89'	Report	Añonman 2'	Stadium: Stade Mamadou Konaté; Referee: Aïssata Kéita (Guinea)

10 April 2016 WAFCON qualifying	Equatorial Guinea	2–1	Mali	Malabo, Equatorial Guinea
17:30 GMT	G. Samaké 17' (o.g.); Costa 86'	Report	Koité 53'	Stadium: Estadio de Malabo; Referee: Bolokanang Lekgowe (Botswana)

13 October Friendly	Mali	0–1	Cameroon	Bamako, Mali
17:00 GMT		Report	Ngo Mbeleck 17'	Stadium: Stade Mamadou Konaté

16 October Friendly	Mali	0–0	Cameroon	Bamako, Mali
17:00 GMT		Report		Stadium: Stade Mamadou Konaté

20 November 2016 WAFCON GS	Nigeria	6–0	Mali	Limbé, Cameroon
15:00 GMT	Ordega 21'; Oshoala 40', 63', 69', 78'; Sunday 48' (pen.)	Report		Stadium: Stade Municipal de Limbe; Referee: Gladys Lengwe (Zambia)

23 November 2016 WAFCON GS	Kenya	1–3	Mali	Limbé, Cameroon
18:00 GMT	Avilia 80'	Report	Coulibaly 36'; Touré 50', 62' (pen.)	Stadium: Stade Municipal de Limbe; Referee: Salima Mukansanga (Rwanda)

26 November 2016 WAFCON GS	Mali	1–3	Ghana	Yaoundé, Cameroon
18:00 GMT	B. Diarra 87'	Report	Eshun 44'; Suleman 68'; Addo 79' (pen.)	Stadium: Stade Ahmadou Ahidjo; Referee: Maria Rivet (Mauritius)

=== 2018 ===
15 February 2018 WAFU Zone B Cup GS	Nigeria	1–0	Mali	Abidjan, Ivory Coast
19:00 GMT	Efih 90+4'	Report		Stadium: Parc des sports de Treichville

17 February 2018 WAFU Zone B Cup GS	Mali	8–0	Togo	Abidjan, Ivory Coast
19:00 GMT	F. Diarra 16', 31'; H. Traoré 33'; Touré 35', 72'; A. Traoré 37'; A. Diarra 62'; S. Diarra 83'	Report		Stadium: Parc des sports de Treichville

19 February 2018 WAFU Zone B Cup GS	Mali	1–0	Senegal	Abidjan, Ivory Coast
19:00 GMT	A. Diarra 45'	Report		Stadium: Parc des sports de Treichville

22 February 2018 WAFU Zone B Cup SF	Ivory Coast	2–0	Mali	Abidjan, Ivory Coast
16:30 GMT	Kpaho 32', 34'	Report		Stadium: Parc des sports de Treichville

24 February 2018 WAFU Zone B Cup	Mali	1–2	Nigeria	Abidjan, Ivory Coast
16:30 GMT	F. Diarra 10'	Report	Uchendu 14', 40'	Stadium: Robert Champroux Stadium

17 May Friendly	Gambia	2–3	Mali	Bakau, Gambia
16:00 GMT			Koité; Touré; M. Traoré	Stadium: Independence Stadium

20 May Friendly	Gambia	0–2	Mali	Bakau, Gambia
16:00 GMT			A. Diarra; Doumbia	Stadium: Independence Stadium

6 June 2018 WAFCON qualifying	Ivory Coast	2–2	Mali	Abidjan, Ivory Coast
16:00 GMT	Elloh 37' (pen.); N'Guessan 90'	Report	Tangara 7'; Touré 47'	Stadium: Felix Houphouet Boigny Stadium; Referee: Aurore Ligan (Benin)

10 June 2018 WAFCON qualifying	Mali	0–0	Ivory Coast	Bamako, Mali
16:30 GMT		Report		Stadium: Stade Mamadou Konaté; Referee: Bouchra Karboubi (Morocco)

17 November 2018 WAFCON GS	Mali	1–2	Cameroon	Accra, Ghana
18:30 GMT	A. Traoré 56'	Report	Meffometou 71'; Nchout 73'	Stadium: Accra Sports Stadium; Referee: Jonesia Kabakama (Tanzania)

20 November 2018 WAFCON GS	Ghana	1–2	Mali	Accra, Ghana
15:30 GMT	Addo 71' (pen.)	Report	Touré 24' (pen.), 75'	Stadium: Accra Sports Stadium; Referee: Letticia Viana (Eswatini)

23 November 2018 WAFCON GS	Algeria	2–3	Mali	Cape Coast, Ghana
16:00 GMT	Belkacemi 37'; Merrouche 63' (pen.)	Report	F. Diarra 58', 90+4' (pen.); Diadhiou 83'	Stadium: Cape Coast Sports Stadium; Referee: Patience Madu (Nigeria)

27 November 2018 WAFCON SF	South Africa	2–0	Mali	Cape Coast, Ghana
18:30 GMT	Kgatlana 31'; Ramalepe 81'	Report		Stadium: Cape Coast Sports Stadium; Referee: Jonesia Kabakama (Tanzania)

30 November 2018 WAFCON 3rd place	Cameroon	4–2	Mali	Cape Coast, Ghana
16:00 GMT	Abena 32', 40'; Onguéné 62'; Manie 90+2'	Report	F. Diarra 44'; Awona 56' (o.g.)	Stadium: Cape Coast Sports Stadium; Referee: Maria Rivet (Mauritius)

=== 2019 ===
3 April 2020 Summer Olympics qualifying	Mali	3–1	Morocco	Bamako, Mali
17:00 GMT	S. Diarra 3', 53'; A. Traoré 10'	Report	Badri 54'	Stadium: Stade Mamadou Konaté

7 April 2020 Summer Olympics qualifying	Morocco	2–2	Mali	Salé, Morocco
15:00 GMT	Jraïdi 24', 82'	Report	S. Diarra 68' (pen.); A. Diarra 90'	Stadium: Stade Boubker Ammar

9 May 2019 WAFU Zone B Cup GS	Niger	0–12	Mali	Abidjan, Ivory Coast
18:30 GMT		Report	Touré 18', 36', 65', 81'; B. Diarra 21'; S. Diarra 47', 54'; Doumbia 51', 59'; A. Diarra 69'; F. Diarra 73'; Tangara 83'	Stadium: Parc des sports de Treichville

11 May 2019 WAFU Zone B Cup GS	Burkina Faso	1–3	Mali	Abidjan, Ivory Coast
18:30 GMT	Sawadogo 45+1'	Report	Sogoré 15'; Touré; F. Diarra	Stadium: Parc des sports de Treichville; Referee: Juliet Appiah (Ghana)

14 May 2019 WAFU Zone B Cup GS	Mali	0–2	Nigeria	Abidjan, Ivory Coast
16:00 GMT		Report	Sule 67'; Kanu 90+2'	Stadium: Robert Champroux Stadium

16 May 2019 WAFU Zone B Cup SF	Ivory Coast	2–1	Mali	Abidjan, Ivory Coast
15:00 GMT	N'Guessan 76'; Diakite	Report	Touré 45+3'	Stadium: Robert Champroux Stadium; Referee: Aurore Ligan (Benin)

18 May 2019 WAFU Zone B Cup	Ghana	0–0 (8–7 p)	Mali	Abidjan, Ivory Coast
		Report		Stadium: Robert Champroux Stadium

31 August 2020 Summer Olympics qualifying	Ivory Coast	3–0	Mali	Abidjan, Ivory Coast
15:30	Nrehy 45+2'; N'Guessan 61'; Elloh 81'	Report		Stadium: Parc des sports de Treichville; Referee: Incaf El Harkaoui (Morocco)

3 September 2020 Summer Olympics qualifying	Mali	0–0	Ivory Coast	Bamako, Mali
16:00 GMT		Report		Stadium: Stade Mamadou Konaté

=== 2020 ===
26 March 2020 WAFU Zone A Cup GS	Mali	6–0	Gambia	Makeni, Sierra Leone
14:00 GMT	A. Diarra 33' (pen.), 49', 57'; Kone 45', 46'; S. Sidibé 75'	Report		Stadium: Wusum Sports Stadium

28 February 2020 WAFU Zone A Cup GS	Mali	3–0	Liberia	Makeni, Sierra Leone
14:00 GMT	S. Sidibé 31'; B. Diarra 43'; A. Diarra 78'	Report		Stadium: Wusum Sports Stadium

2 March 2020 WAFU Zone A Cup GS	Guinea-Bissau	0–2	Mali	Bo, Sierra Leone
16:00 GMT		Report	S. Sidibé 60'; A. Diarra 90+1'	Stadium: Bo Stadium

4 March 2020 WAFU Zone A Cup SF	Mali	4–0	Cape Verde	Makeni, Sierra Leone
16:00 GMT	A. Diarra 32', 42'; S. Sidibé 55', 88'	Report		Stadium: Wusum Sports Stadium

7 March 2020 WAFU Zone A Cup F	Senegal	3–0	Mali	Makeni, Sierra Leone
16:30 GMT	Diakhaté 27'; Sow 59'; Baldé 69'	Report		Stadium: Wusum Sports Stadium

=== 2021 ===
10 June Friendly	Morocco	3–0	Mali	Rabat, Morocco
18:00 GMT	Ayane 1'; Saoud 44'; Amani 45+3'	Report		Stadium: Moulay El Hassan Stadium

14 June Friendly	Morocco	3–2	Mali	Rabat, Morocco
18:00 GMT	Sacko 13' (o.g.); Senhaji 14', 35'	Report	F. Diarra 29', 43'	Stadium: Moulay El Hassan Stadium

15 September 2021 Aisha Buhari Cup	Nigeria	2–0	Mali	Lagos, Nigeria
15:00 GMT	Monday 82', 90+2'	Report		Stadium: Onikan Stadium

19 September 2021 Aisha Buhari Cup	Morocco	0–0	Mali	Lagos, Nigeria
15:00 GMT		Report		Stadium: Onikan Stadium

20 October 2022 WAFCON qualifying	Mali	2–2	Guinea	Bamako, Mali
16:30 GMT	B. Diarra 11'; A. Traoré 22'	Report	Sogoré 5' (o.g.); M. Camara 66'	Stadium: Stade Modibo Kéïta; Referee: Shahenda El Maghrabi (Egypt)

25 October 2022 WAFCON qualifying	Guinea	0–2	Mali	Conakry, Guinea
16:00 GMT		Report	A. Traoré 56'; A. Diarra 77'	Stadium: General Lansana Conté Stadium; Referee: Aïssata Lam (Mauritania)

=== 2022 ===
16 February 2022 WAFCON qualifying	Senegal	1–0	Mali	Thiès, Senegal
14:30 GMT	N. Ndiaye 72'	Report		Stadium: Stade Lat-Dior; Referee: Aïssata Lam (Mauritania)

22 February 2022 WAFCON qualifying	Mali	1–0 (2–3 p)	Senegal	Bamako, Mali
18:00 GMT	A. Diarra 14'	Report		Stadium: Stade Modibo Kéïta; Referee: Juliet Appiah (Ghana)
	Penalties
	F. Diarra (penalty missed); S. Diarra (penalty missed); Sogoré (penalty scored); D. Baradji (penalty scored); Niakaté (penalty missed)		(penalty scored) Diop; (penalty missed) Ndiaye; (penalty scored) Diakhaté; (penalty scored) Baldé

=== 2023 ===
12 July 2024 Summer Olympics qualifying	Burkina Faso	0–1	Mali	Cotonou, Benin
13:30 GMT		Report	A. Diarra 11'	Stadium: Stade de l'Amitié

18 July 2024 Summer Olympics qualifying	Mali	2–2 (a.e.t.)	Burkina Faso	Bamako, Mali
16:30 GMT	A. Traoré 29'; Sogoré 100'	Report	Sawadogo 11', 52'	Stadium: Stade du 26 Mars

22 September 2024 WAFCON qualifying	Central African Republic	1–7	Mali	Douala, Cameroon
13:00 GMT	Demba 45+3' (pen.)	Report	A. Diarra 3', 15' (pen.), 55'; F. Diarra 6'; Kone 18'; A. Traoré 43', 48'	Stadium: Stade de la Réunification

26 September 2024 WAFCON qualifying	Mali	3–0	Central African Republic	Bamako, Mali
16:30	A. Diarra 31'; A. Traoré 35'; S. Diarra 58'	Report		Stadium: Stade du 26 Mars

30 November 2024 WAFCON qualifying	Mali	7–2	Guinea	Bamako, Mali
16:30 GMT	A. Diarra 5', 45+2', 69'; F. Dembele 11'; Sogoré 34'; D. Baradji 82'; A. Traoré 90+2'	Report	Lamah 39'; Kourouma 90'	Stadium: Stade du 26 Mars

5 December 2024 WAFCON qualifying	Guinea	0–3	Mali	Thiès, Senegal
17:00 GMT		Report	F. Diarra 41'; Kone 57'; A. Diarra 90+4'	Stadium: Stade Lat-Dior; Referee: Natacha Konan (Ivory Coast)

=== 2024 ===
29 May Friendly	Mali	9–0	Seychelles	Dar es Salaam, Tanzania
13:00 GMT	S. Traoré 9', 32' (pen.), 51'; Konté 17'; H. Baradji 55' (pen.); A. Diarra 60', 83'; N. Diarra 86'; A. Traoré 89'	Report		Stadium: Azam Complex

31 May Friendly	Tanzania	2–2	Mali	Dar es Salaam, Tanzania
16:00 GMT	Masaka 31'; Clement 68'	Report	A. Diarra 4'; A. Traoré 29'	Stadium: Azam Complex

30 November Friendly	Mali	0–1	Botswana	Tanger, Morocco
14:30		Report	Moloi 62'	Stadium: Tanger Stadium

3 December Friendly	Morocco	1–0	Mali	Tétouan, Morocco
17:00 GMT	Jraïdi 7'	Report		Stadium: Saniat Rmel Stadium; Referee: Zomadre Kore (Ivory Coast)

=== 2025 ===
20 February 2026 WAFCON qualifying	Gabon	0–6	Mali	Franceville, Gabon
14:30 GMT		Report	A. Traoré 3', 7'; A. Diarra 20', 34'; F. Dembele 55'; F. Niakaté 74'	Stadium: Stade de Franceville; Referee: Zakia El Grini (Morocco)

25 February 2026 WAFCON qualifying	Mali	4–1	Gabon	Bamako, Mali
19:00 GMT	A. Diarra 22' (pen.); S. Diarra 36'; Sogoré 43'; Tapily 82'	Report	Assengone 81' (pen.)	Stadium: Stade du 26 Mars

22 May 2025 WAFU Zone A Cup GS	Mauritania	0–5	Mali	Nouakchott, Mauritania
16:00		Report	Koné 5'; S. Diarra 14', 66'; Ag. Diarra 26'; Samaké 28'	Stadium: Cheikha Ould Boïdiya Stadium; Referee: Fatou Ngum (Gambia)

24 May 2025 WAFU Zone A Cup GS	Guinea-Bissau	1–4	Mali	Nouakchott, Mauritania
19:00	Iala 36'	Report	Koné 24', 49', 62'; Ag. Diarra 40'	Stadium: Stade Ksar; Referee: Aida Sy (Senegal)

26 May 2025 WAFU Zone A Cup GS	Mali	1–1	Liberia	Nouakchott, Mauritania
16:00	F. Dembele 21'	Report	Yantay 45+3'	Stadium: Stade Ksar; Referee: Fatou Ngum (Gambia)

29 May 2025 WAFU Zone A Cup SF	Mali	0–1	Sierra Leone	Nouakchott, Mauritania
16:00		Report	S. Kamara 82'	Stadium: Cheikha Ould Boïdiya Stadium; Referee: Félicité Kourouma (Guinea)

31 May 2025 WAFU Zone A Cup	Mali	0–1	Liberia	Nouakchott, Mauritania
17:00		Report	Glao 63'	Stadium: Cheikha Ould Boïdiya Stadium; Referee: Félicité Kourouma (Guinea)

30 June Friendly	Mali	1–1	Zambia	Mohammedia, Morocco
17:00 GMT		Report

7 July 2024 WAFCON GS	Mali	1–0	Tanzania	Berkane, Morocco
19:00 GMT	S. Traoré 45+1'	Report		Stadium: Berkane Stadium; Referee: Aline Guimbang A Etong (Cameroon)

11 July 2024 WAFCON GS	Ghana	1–1	Mali	Berkane, Morocco
16:00 GMT	Kusi 6'	Report	A. Traoré 52'	Stadium: Berkane Stadium; Referee: Ghada Mehat (Algeria)

14 July 2024 WAFCON GS	South Africa	4–0	Mali	Oujda, Morocco
19:00 GMT	Ramalepe 5'; Jane 32'; Magaia 61'; Donnelly 79'	Report		Stadium: Honneur Stadium; Referee: Bouchra Karboubi (Morocco)

18 July 2024 WAFCON QF	Morocco	3–1	Mali	Rabat, Morocco
20:00 GMT	Jraïdi 7', 79' (pen.); Chapelle 89'	Report	A. Traoré 90+7' (pen.)	Stadium: Rabat Olympic Stadium; Referee: Akhona Makalima (South Africa)

24 October 2026 WAFCON qualifying	Cape Verde	0–1	Mali	Praia, Cape Verde
16:00 GMT		Report	C. Dembele 81'	Stadium: Estádio Nacional de Cabo Verde; Referee: Aicha Bit Oumarou (Chad)

28 October 2026 WAFCON qualifying	Mali	2–4	Cape Verde	Bamako, Mali
17:00 GMT	Kone 55', 88'	Report	Melo 14'; Moreira 17'; Vieira 24'; Pereira 72'	Stadium: Stade du 26 Mars; Referee: Kindédji Edoh (Togo)

=== 2026 ===
17 April Friendly	Morocco	1–1	Mali	Rabat, Morocco
17:30 GMT	Jraïdi 61'	Report	A. Traoré 45+4'	Stadium: Moulay El Hassan Stadium; Referee: Dorsaf Ganouati (Tunisia)

27 July 2026 WAFCON GS	Cameroon	2-1	Mali	Casablanca, Morocco
21:00	Ngah Manga 14', 73' (pen.)	Report (FIFA)	A. Traoré 30' (pen.)	Stadium: Larbi Zaouli Stadium; Referee: Antsino Twanyanyukwa (Namibia)

30 July 2026 WAFCON GS	Mali	3-2	Cape Verde	Fez, Morocco
21:00	Koné 29'; F. Niakaté 50'; F. Diarra 79'	Report (FIFA)	Pereira 36'; Kelly 88'	Stadium: Fez Stadium; Referee: Aminata Fullah (Sierra Leone)

6 August 2026 WAFCON GS	Mali	1-1	Ghana	Casablanca
21:00 (UTC+01:00)	Diabaté 50'	Report (FIFA)	Badu 45+3'	Stadium: Moulay Rachid Stadium; Referee: Akhona Makalima (South Africa)

8 October 2028 Summer Olympic qualifying	Benin	3–1	Mali

13 October 2028 Summer Olympic qualifying	Mali	6–2	Benin	Bamako, Mali

== See also ==
- Mali women's national football team
- Mali national football team results (2020–present)
