= 2016 Women's Africa Cup of Nations squads =

The squad listings were announced on 16 November 2016.

== Group A ==
=== Cameroon ===
Head coach: Enow Ngachu

No.	Pos.	Player	Date of birth (age)	Club
1	GK	Annette Ngo Ndom	2 June 1985 (aged 31)	(Cameroonian Football Federation) Amazone Fap
2	FW	Christine Manie	4 May 1984 (aged 32)	(Romanian Football Federation) Cff Olimpi Cluj
3	MF	Ajara Nchout	12 January 1993 (aged 23)	(Swedish Football Association) Kansli
4	DF	Yvonne Leuko	20 November 1991 (aged 24)	(French Football Federation) Arras Feminine
5	MF	Augustine Ejangue	19 January 1989 (aged 27)	(Danish Football Association) Fortuna
6	MF	Augustine Ngo Mback	1 July 1997 (aged 19)	(Cameroonian Football Federation) Louves Minproff
7	FW	Gabrielle Onguéné	25 February 1989 (aged 27)	(Russian Football Union) Rossyanka
8	FW	Raissa Feudjio	29 October 1995 (aged 21)	(Football Association of Finland) Aland United
9	FW	Madeleine Ngono Mani	16 October 1983 (aged 33)	(French Football Federation) Football Claix
10	FW	Jeannette Yango	12 June 1993 (aged 23)	(French Football Federation) Stade Brestois
11	DF	Aurelle Awona	2 February 1993 (aged 23)	(French Football Federation) Asj Soyaux
12	DF	Claudine Meffometou	1 July 1990 (aged 26)	(French Football Federation) Arras Feminine
13	FW	Jacquette Ada	27 August 1991 (aged 25)	(Turkish Football Federation) Besiktas
14	FW	Agnès Nkada	12 March 1995 (aged 21)	(French Football Federation) FC Lorient
15	DF	Ysis Sonkeng	20 September 1989 (aged 27)	(Cameroonian Football Federation) Louves Minproff
16	GK	Thècle Mbororo	24 September 1989 (aged 27)	(Cameroonian Football Federation) Panthere Security
17	FW	Gaëlle Enganamouit	9 June 1992 (aged 24)	(Swedish Football Association) FC Rosengard
18	FW	Henriette Akaba	7 June 1992 (aged 24)	(Turkish Football Federation) Trabzonspor
19	FW	Agathe Ngani	26 May 1992 (aged 24)	(French Football Federation) FC Lorient
20	MF	Genevieve Ngo	10 March 1993 (aged 23)	(Cameroonian Football Federation) Louves Minproff
21	GK	Isabelle Mambingo	10 April 1991 (aged 25)	(Cameroonian Football Federation) Amazone Fap

=== Egypt ===
Head coach: Mohamed Mostafa Abdelhameed

No.	Pos.	Player	Date of birth (age)	Club
1	GK	Maha Shehata	13 February 1989 (aged 27)	(Egyptian Football Association) Wadi Degla
2	MF	Samia Adam	19 April 1996 (aged 20)	Unattached
3	DF	Rana Hamdy	11 September 1989 (aged 27)	Unattached
4	DF	Sara Mohamed	6 July 1990 (aged 26)	(Egyptian Football Association) Wadi Degla
5	DF	Mervat Rashwan	5 June 1993 (aged 23)	(Egyptian Football Association) Tayaran
6	MF	Engy Sayed	4 September 1986 (aged 30)	(Egyptian Football Association) Wadi Degla
7	FW	Nadin Ghazy	24 November 2001 (aged 14)	(Egyptian Football Association) Elamyeen
8	MF	Omnia Mahmoud	6 February 1994 (aged 22)	(Egyptian Football Association) Wadi Degla
9	MF	Amany Rashad	1 July 1983 (aged 33)	(Egyptian Football Association) Wadi Degla
10	FW	Salma Tarik	22 November 1989 (aged 26)	Unattached
11	MF	Fayza Rahim	12 February 1984 (aged 32)	(Egyptian Football Association) Tayaran
12	FW	Suzanne Arafa	5 November 1994 (aged 22)	Unattached
13	FW	Aliaa Elzenouki	15 June 1997 (aged 19)	(Egyptian Football Association) Wadi Degla
14	MF	Mahira Eldanbouki	1 November 1997 (aged 19)	(Egyptian Football Association) Elalmyeen
15	FW	Noha Tarek	1 March 1999 (aged 17)	(Egyptian Football Association) Wadi Degla
16	GK	Elham Abdelnaaem	26 September 1994 (aged 22)	(Egyptian Football Association) Tayaran
17	MF	Sherouk Farhan	26 November 1999 (aged 16)	(Egyptian Football Association) Wadi Degla
18	MF	Mirna Youssef	5 February 1996 (aged 20)	(Egyptian Football Association) Tayaran
19	MF	Esraa Awad	1 December 1986 (aged 29)	(Egyptian Football Association) Elamyeen
20	DF	Rehab Eid Abdelaziz Attia	6 February 1988 (aged 28)	(Egyptian Football Association) Tayaran
21	GK	Farah Hassan	2 July 2001 (aged 15)	(Egyptian Football Association) Wadi Degla

=== South Africa ===
Head coach: Desiree Ellis

No.	Pos.	Player	Date of birth (age)	Club
1	GK	Roxanne Barker	6 May 1991 (aged 25)	(Royal Dutch Football Association) Heerenveen
2	GK	Lebogang Mabatle	3 March 1992 (aged 24)	(South African Football Association) Tuks
3	GK	Nothando Vilakazi	28 October 1988 (aged 28)	(South African Football Association) Palace Super Falcon
4	DF	Noko Matlou	30 September 1985 (aged 31)	(South African Football Association) Ma-Indies
5	DF	Janine van Wyk	17 April 1987 (aged 29)	(South African Football Association) JVW
6	DF	Mamello Makhabane	24 February 1988 (aged 28)	(South African Football Association) JVW
7	DF	Nomathemba Charlotte Ntsibande	19 April 1986 (aged 30)	(South African Football Association) Spring Home Sweepers
8	DF	Linda Motlhalo	1 July 1998 (aged 18)	(South African Football Association) JVW
9	DF	Amogelang Motau	27 February 1997 (aged 19)	(South African Football Association) University of Western Cape
10	DF	Silindile Ngubane	25 March 1987 (aged 29)	(South African Football Association) Durban FC
11	DF	Thembi Kgatlana	2 May 1996 (aged 20)	(South African Football Association) University of Western Cape
12	MF	Jermaine Seoposenwe	12 October 1993 (aged 23)	Unattached
13	MF	Bambanani Mbane	12 March 1990 (aged 26)	(South African Football Association) Bloemfontein
14	MF	Andisiwe Mgcoyi	16 June 1988 (aged 28)	(South African Football Association) Mamelodi Sundowns
15	MF	Refiloe Jane	4 August 1992 (aged 24)	(South African Football Association) Mamelodi Sundowns
16	MF	Andile Dlamini	2 September 1992 (aged 24)	(South African Football Association) Mamelodi Sundowns
17	MF	Leandra Smeda	22 July 1989 (aged 27)	(South African Football Association) University of Western Cape
18	MF	Nompumelelo Nyandeni	19 August 1987 (aged 29)	(South African Football Association) JVW
19	MF	Astria Boks	26 February 1994 (aged 22)	(South African Football Association) Santos
20	FW	Shiwe Nogwanya	7 March 1994 (aged 22)	(South African Football Association) Bloemfontein Celtics
21	FW	Yolula Tsawe	23 June 1992 (aged 24)	(South African Football Association) JVW

=== Zimbabwe ===
Head coach: Shadreck Mlauzi

No.	Pos.	Player	Date of birth (age)	Club
1	GK	Chido Dzingirai	25 October 1991 (aged 25)	(Zimbabwe Football Association) Flame lily
2	MF	Aldiglade Bhamu	26 November 1987 (aged 28)	(Zimbabwe Football Association) Mufakose Queens
3	DF	Shiela Makoto	14 January 1990 (aged 26)	(Zimbabwe Football Association) Blue Swallows
4	DF	Nobuhle Majika	9 May 1991 (aged 25)	(Zimbabwe Football Association) Inline Academy
5	MF	Emmaculate Msipa	7 June 1992 (aged 24)	(Zimbabwe Football Association) Black Rhinos
6	MF	Felistas Muzongondi	22 March 1986 (aged 30)	(Zimbabwe Football Association) Mwenezana
7	FW	Maudy Mafuruse	24 April 1999 (aged 17)	(Zimbabwe Football Association) Faithdrive FC
8	DF	Patience Mujuru	21 December 1986 (aged 29)	(Zimbabwe Football Association) Black Rhinos
9	DF	Nobukhosi Ncube	17 February 1993 (aged 23)	(Zimbabwe Football Association) New Orleans
10	MF	Talent Mandaza	11 December 1985 (aged 30)	(Zimbabwe Football Association) Black Rhinos
11	DF	Ruvimbo Mutyavaviri	8 December 1986 (aged 29)	(Zimbabwe Football Association) Mufakose Queens
12	MF	Marjory Nyaumwe	10 July 1987 (aged 29)	(Zimbabwe Football Association) Flame lily
13	MF	Berita Kabwe	17 December 1990 (aged 25)	(Zimbabwe Football Association) Flame lily
14	DF	Eunice Chibanda	26 March 1993 (aged 23)	(Zimbabwe Football Association) Black Rhinos
15	FW	Rutendo Makore	30 September 1992 (aged 24)	(Zimbabwe Football Association) Black Rhinos
16	GK	Lindiwe Magwede	1 December 1991 (aged 24)	(Zimbabwe Football Association) Cyclone Stars FC
17	FW	Kudakwashe Basopo	18 July 1990 (aged 26)	(Zimbabwe Football Association) Black Rhinos
18	MF	Mavis Chirandu	15 January 1995 (aged 21)	(Zimbabwe Football Association) Weerams FC
19	MF	Sifundile Moyo	17 December 1991 (aged 24)	(Zimbabwe Football Association) Inline Academy
20	DF	Danai Bhobho	1 December 1992 (aged 23)	(Zimbabwe Football Association) Mwenezana
21	GK	Manyara Mandara	18 June 1991 (aged 25)	(Zimbabwe Football Association) Mwenezana

== Group B ==
=== Ghana ===
Head coach: Yusif Basigi

No.	Pos.	Player	Date of birth (age)	Club
1	GK	Fafali Dumehasi	25 December 1993 (aged 22)	(Ghana Football Association) Police Ladies
2	DF	Cynthia Adjei	23 September 1991 (aged 25)	(Ghana Football Association) Police Ladies
3	DF	Linda Eshun	5 August 1992 (aged 24)	(Ghana Football Association) Hasaacas Ladies
4	DF	Janet Egyir	7 May 1992 (aged 24)	(Ghana Football Association) Hasaacas Ladies
5	DF	Faiza Ibrahim	22 March 1990 (aged 26)	(Ghana Football Association) Police Ladies
6	MF	Priscilla Saahene	24 July 1992 (aged 24)	(Ghana Football Association) Fabulous Ladies
7	MF	Safia Rahman	5 May 1986 (aged 30)	(Ghana Football Association) Lepo Ladies FC
8	MF	Juliet Acheampong	11 July 1991 (aged 25)	(Ghana Football Association) Ashtown Ladies
9	FW	Samira Suleman	16 August 1991 (aged 25)	(Ghana Football Association) Hasaacas Ladies
10	MF	Grace Asare	12 October 1989 (aged 27)	(Ghana Football Association) Prisons Ladies
11	MF	Cynthia Adobea	1 August 1990 (aged 26)	(Ghana Football Association) Prisons Ladies
12	MF	Alice Kusi	12 January 1995 (aged 21)	(Ghana Football Association) Fabulous Ladies
13	MF	Mary Essiful	22 June 1993 (aged 23)	(Ghana Football Association) Intellectuals
14	MF	Priscilla Okyere	6 June 1995 (aged 21)	(Ghana Football Association) Fabulous Ladies
15	MF	Rosemary Ampem	27 August 1992 (aged 24)	(Ghana Football Association) Immigration Ladies
16	GK	Nana Asantewaa	28 December 1993 (aged 22)	(Ghana Football Association) Police Ladies
17	FW	Portia Boakye	17 April 1989 (aged 27)	(Ghana Football Association) Fabulous Ladies
18	MF	Elizabeth Addo	1 September 1993 (aged 23)	(Swedish Football Association) Kvarnsvedensik
19	MF	Regina Antwi	26 November 1995 (aged 20)	(Ghana Football Association) Hasaacas Ladies
20	FW	Florence Dadson	23 April 1992 (aged 24)	(United States Soccer Federation) Dayton Dutch Lions
21	GK	Patricia Mantey	27 September 1992 (aged 24)	(Ghana Football Association) Immigration Ladies

=== Kenya ===
Head coach: David Ouma

No.	Pos.	Player	Date of birth (age)	Club
1	GK	Samantha Akinyi	6 January 1995 (aged 21)	(Football Kenya Federation) Spedag
2	DF	Lilian Adera	7 May 1994 (aged 22)	(Football Kenya Federation) Vihiga Queens
3	DF	Irene Ogutu	14 June 1987 (aged 29)	(Football Kenya Federation) Oserian FC
4	MF	Mary Kinuthia	19 February 1990 (aged 26)	(Football Kenya Federation) Thika Queens
5	MF	Dorcas Nixon	4 April 1989 (aged 27)	(Football Kenya Federation) Oserian FC
6	MF	Christine Nafula	10 November 1991 (aged 25)	(Football Kenya Federation) Thika Queens
7	MF	Cheris Salano	11 December 1989 (aged 26)	(Football Kenya Federation) Spedag
8	DF	Ann Aluoch	5 January 1990 (aged 26)	(Football Kenya Federation) Spedag
9	FW	Sharon Bushenei	7 June 1988 (aged 28)	(Football Kenya Federation) Spedag
10	MF	Carolyne Anyango	27 February 1989 (aged 27)	(Football Kenya Federation) Spedag
11	MF	Jacky Ogol	2 December 1994 (aged 21)	(Football Kenya Federation) Spedag
12	MF	Lydia Akoth	22 September 1994 (aged 22)	(Football Kenya Federation) Thika Queens
13	FW	Janet Bundi	15 December 1996 (aged 19)	(Football Kenya Federation) Nyamira Starlets
14	FW	Esse Akida	18 November 1992 (aged 24)	(Football Kenya Federation) Spedag
15	DF	Wendy Achieng	12 September 1993 (aged 23)	(Football Kenya Federation) Spedag
16	MF	Mercy Achieng	12 August 1992 (aged 24)	(Football Kenya Federation) Thika Queens
17	MF	Vivian Corazone	2 October 1998 (aged 18)	(Football Kenya Federation) Soccer Queens
18	GK	Vivian Akinyi	20 May 1994 (aged 22)	(Football Kenya Federation) Soccer Queens
19	DF	Elizabeth Ambogo	28 July 1990 (aged 26)	(Football Kenya Federation) Spedag
20	DF	Doris Anyango	19 November 1993 (aged 23)	(Football Kenya Federation) Spedag
21	GK	Lilian Awuor	13 June 1999 (aged 17)	(Football Kenya Federation) Vihiga Queens

=== Mali ===
Head coach: Oumar Guindo

No.	Pos.	Player	Date of birth (age)	Club
1	GK	Fatoumata Karentao	8 November 1990 (aged 26)	(Malian Football Federation) USFAS
2	DF	Coulouba Sogore	3 June 1997 (aged 19)	(Malian Football Federation) AS Real De Bamako
3	DF	Oumou Tangara	27 July 1994 (aged 22)	(Malian Football Federation) USFAS
4	DF	Aminata Sacko (C)	27 August 1984 (aged 32)	(Malian Football Federation) Super Lionnes
5	DF	Saran Sangare	10 June 1994 (aged 22)	(Malian Football Federation) USFAS
6	DF	Fatoumata Dembele	28 November 1990 (aged 25)	(Malian Football Federation) USFAS
7	FW	Hawa Tangara	12 January 1993 (aged 23)	(Malian Football Federation) AS Real De Bamako
8	MF	Aicha Samake	13 September 1994 (aged 22)	(Malian Football Federation) AS Mande
9	FW	Bassira Touré	6 January 1990 (aged 26)	(Malian Football Federation) AS Mande
10	MF	Binta Diarra	15 December 1994 (aged 21)	(Malian Football Federation) AS Real De Bamako
11	MF	Salimata Diarra	24 October 1994 (aged 22)	(Malian Football Federation) AS Mande
12	MF	Lala Dicko	21 June 1991 (aged 25)	(Malian Football Federation) AS Real De Bamako
13	DF	Aissatou Diadhiou	8 September 1991 (aged 25)	(French Football Federation) FC Domot
14	FW	Sebe Coulibaly	9 February 1994 (aged 22)	(French Football Federation) Tremblay FC
15	MF	Aminata Doucoure	3 April 1994 (aged 22)	(French Football Federation) RC Saint Denis
16	GK	Goundo Samake	2 May 1992 (aged 24)	(Equatoguinean Football Federation) Intercontinental
17	MF	Bintou Koite	20 November 1995 (aged 20)	(Malian Football Federation) AS Mande
18	MF	Aïchata Doumbia	20 August 1985 (aged 31)	(Malian Football Federation) USFAS
19	FW	Djeneba Baradji	16 December 1995 (aged 20)	(French Football Federation) RC Saint Denis
20	MF	Maimouna Traore	1 January 1998 (aged 18)	(Malian Football Federation) AS Police
21	GK	Hawa Keita	19 February 1996 (aged 20)	(Malian Football Federation) AS Real De Bamako

=== Nigeria ===
Head coach: Florence Omagbemi

No.	Pos.	Player	Date of birth (age)	Club
1	GK	Ibubeleye Whyte	9 January 1992 (aged 24)	(Nigeria Football Federation) Rivers Angels F.C.
2	DF	Faith Ikidi	28 February 1987 (aged 29)	(Swedish Football Association) Piteå IF
3	DF	Osinachi Ohale	21 December 1991 (aged 24)	(Nigeria Football Federation) Rivers Angels F.C.
4	MF	Osarenoma Igbinovia	5 June 1996 (aged 20)	(Nigeria Football Federation) Bayelsa Queens F.C.
5	DF	Onome Ebi	8 May 1983 (aged 33)	(Football Federation of Belarus) FC Minsk
6	DF	Ngozi Ebere	5 August 1991 (aged 25)	(French Football Federation) Paris Saint-Germain Féminines
7	MF	Wogu Chioma Success	28 January 1999 (aged 17)	(Nigeria Football Federation) Rivers Angels F.C.
8	FW	Asisat Oshoala	9 October 1994 (aged 22)	(The Football Association) Arsenal Ladies F.C.
9	FW	Desire Oparanozie	17 December 1993 (aged 22)	(French Football Federation) EA Guingamp
10	MF	Rita Chikwelu	6 March 1988 (aged 28)	(Swedish Football Association) Umeå IK
11	FW	Esther Sunday	13 March 1992 (aged 24)	(Turkish Football Federation) Trabzonspor
12	DF	Gladys Akpa	1 January 1986 (aged 30)	(Nigeria Football Federation) Rivers Angels F.C.
13	MF	Ngozi Okobi	14 December 1993 (aged 22)	(Swedish Football Association) Vittsjö GIK
14	DF	Evelyn Nwabuoku	14 November 1985 (aged 31)	(French Football Federation) EA Guingamp
15	DF	Ugo Njoku	27 November 1994 (aged 21)	(Nigeria Football Federation) Rivers Angels F.C.
16	GK	Alaba Jonathan	1 June 1992 (aged 24)	(Nigeria Football Federation) Bayelsa Queens F.C.
17	FW	Francisca Ordega	19 October 1993 (aged 23)	(United States Soccer Federation) Washington Spirit
18	MF	Halimatu Ayinde	16 May 1995 (aged 21)	(Football Federation of Belarus) FC Minsk
19	MF	Ijeoma Obi	1 April 1985 (aged 31)	(Nigeria Football Federation) Sunshine Queens F.C.
20	FW	Uchechi Sunday	9 September 1994 (aged 22)	(Korea Football Association) Incheon Daeyko
21	GK	Rita Akarekor	13 February 2001 (aged 15)	(Nigeria Football Federation) Delta Queens F.C.
