= 2019 WAFU Zone B Women's Cup =

Tournament details
- Host country: Côte d'Ivoire
- Dates: 8-18 May 2019
- Teams: 8 (from 1 sub-confederation)
- Venues: 2 (in 1 host city)

Final positions
- Champions: Nigeria (1st title)
- Runners-up: Ivory Coast
- Third place: Ghana
- Fourth place: Mali

Tournament statistics
- Matches played: 16
- Goals scored: 69 (4.31 per match)
- Top scorer: Uchenna Kanu (10)

The 2019 WAFU Zone B Women's Cup was the second edition of the international women's football event for teams from Zone B of the West African Football Union (WAFU). The competition was hosted by Ivory Coast, and Ghana were the defending champions. All team had participate only Benin did not enter . Nigeria defeated Ivory Coast through penalties in the final to win their first trophy in the tournament. Uchenna Kanu topped the scorers chart with ten goals.

== Draw ==
The draws were made on April 16, 2019 in Abidjan, Ivory Coast, with May 8 set for the opening game. The tournament was also highlighted as preparation for Football at the Summer Olympics qualifiers for some of the teams. Robert Champroux Stadium and Stade du Parc des Sports were retained as venues.

== Squad ==
Nigeria's manager, Thomas Dennerby released his 20-man squad for the tournament on May 6. Ghana's manager, named the full squad

== Group stage ==
=== Group A ===
Pos	Team	Pld	W	D	L	GF	GA	GD	Pts	Qualification
1	Ivory Coast (H)	3	2	1	0	9	0	+9	7	Advance to semi-finals
2	Ghana	3	2	1	0	8	0	+8	7	Advance to semi-finals
3	Togo	3	1	0	2	2	12	−10	3	
4	Senegal	3	0	0	3	1	8	−7	0	

(H) Hosts
8 May 2019

Ghana	2–0	Senegal

8 May 2019

Ivory Coast	5–0	Togo
Tokpoledo 9' (pen.); Diakité 26'; Agbo 33'; N'Guessan 52'; Kouadio 90+3'	Report

10 May 2019

Ghana	6–0	Togo

10 May 2019

Ivory Coast	4–0	Senegal
N'Guessan 66'; Kouassi 85', 89'; Kreto 90+3'	Report

13 May 2019

Ghana	0–0	Ivory Coast
	Report

13 May 2019

Senegal	1–2	Togo

=== Group B ===
Pos	Team	Pld	W	D	L	GF	GA	GD	Pts	Qualification
1	Nigeria	3	3	0	0	22	1	+21	9	Advance to semi-finals
2	Mali	3	2	0	1	15	3	+12	6	Advance to semi-finals
3	Burkina Faso	3	1	0	2	7	8	−1	3	
4	Niger	3	0	0	3	0	32	−32	0	

Source: WAFU B
9 May 2019
16:00

Nigeria	5–1	Burkina Faso
Kanu 8', 47'; Nwabuoku 10' (pen.); Okoronkwo 23' (pen.), 64'	Report	Simporé (red card) 9'; Millogo 71'

Treichville Sports Park, Treichville
Referee: Vincentia Amedome (Togo)
9 May 2019
18:30

Niger	0–12	Mali
	Report	Touré 18', 36', 65', 81'; B. Diarra 21'; S. Diarra 47', 54'; Doumbia 51', 59'; A. Diarra 69'; F. Diarra 73'; Tangara 83'

Treichville Sports Park, Treichville

11 May 2019
16:00

Nigeria	15–0	Niger
Aku 9', 28'; Kanu 11', 31', 39', 41', 45+2'; Sule 23', 51'; Bokiri 34'; Ogebe 61' (pen.); Nunumwen 66'; Wogu 72'; Okeke 80' (pen.); Ogbonna 90+1'	Report

Treichville Sports Park, Treichville
11 May 2019
18:30

Burkina Faso	1–3	Mali
Sawadogo 45+1'		Sogoré 15'; Touré; F. Diarra

Treichville Sports Park, Treichville
Referee: Juliet Appiah (Ghana)

14 May 2019
16:00

Mali	0–2	Nigeria
	Report	Sule 67'; Kanu 92'

Robert Champroux Stadium, Marcory
14 May 2019
16:00

Burkina Faso	5–0	Niger
Sawadogo 9' (pen.), 32'; Tamboura 36', 46'; Ilboudo 57'

Treichville Sports Park, Treichville

== Knockout stage ==
=== Semi finals ===
16 May 2019

Ivory Coast	2–1	Mali
N'Guessan; Diakite	Report

16 May 2019

Ghana	0–0	Nigeria
	Report
Penalties
	2–4

=== Third place ===
18 May 2019

Ghana	0–0	Mali
	Report
Penalties
	8–7

=== Final ===
18 May 2019

Ivory Coast	1–1	Nigeria
N'Guessan 42'	Report	Kanu 94'
Penalties
	4–5

Stade Robert Champroux de Macory
