= 2020 CAF Women's Olympic qualifying tournament =

Football tournament qualification stage

Tournament details
- Dates: 3 April 2019 – 10 March 2020
- Teams: 25 (from 1 confederation)

Final positions
- Champions: Zambia
- Runners-up: Cameroon

Tournament statistics
- Matches played: 41
- Goals scored: 100 (2.44 per match)
- Top scorer: (Zambia) Grace Chanda (8 goals)

The Confederation of African Football (CAF) organized the 5th edition of its qualifying tournament for African female national teams from 3 April 2019 to 10 March 2020 so as to gain entry into the 2020 Summer Olympics women's football tournament in Japan, in which CAF was allocated 1.5 places by FIFA.

Zambia qualified directly as winners, while as runners-up, Cameroon entered a play-off against the second-placed team from CONMEBOL, Chile.

== Teams ==
All 54 CAF member nations were eligible to enter the qualifying competition and a total of 25 national teams were in the qualifying draw which was announced on 21 February 2019. The seven teams which had the best performance at the previous edition of the qualifying competition were given a bye to the second round.

Despite competing in the qualifying competition, Equatorial Guinea were banned by FIFA from qualifying for the 2020 Summer Olympics.

Bye to second round (7 teams)	First round entrants (18 teams)
Cameroon; Equatorial Guinea **(W)**; Ghana; Kenya; Nigeria; South Africa; Zimbabwe	Algeria; Angola **(W)**; Botswana; Chad; Congo; DR Congo; Ethiopia; Gabon; Ivory Coast; Malawi; Mali; Morocco; Mozambique; Namibia; Sierra Leone **(D)**; Tanzania; Uganda; Zambia

Notes

- Teams in **bold** qualified for the Olympics
- (D): Disqualified after draw
- (W): Withdrew after draw

Did not enter

- Benin
- Burkina Faso
- Burundi
- Cape Verde
- Central African Republic
- Comoros
- Djibouti
- Egypt
- Eritrea
- Eswatini
- Gambia
- Guinea
- Guinea-Bissau
- Lesotho
- Liberia
- Libya
- Madagascar
- Mauritania
- Mauritius
- Niger
- Rwanda
- São Tomé and Príncipe
- Senegal
- Seychelles
- Somalia
- South Sudan
- Sudan
- Tunisia
- Togo

== Format ==
Qualification ties are played on a home-and-away two-legged basis. The away goals rule is applied if the aggregate score is tied after the second leg, and if still level, extra time is played. The away goals rule applied again after extra time, although the penalty shoot-out applied if scorewere still level/unchanged.

== Schedule ==
The schedule of the qualifying rounds was as follows. All matches were played during the FIFA International Window.

Round	Leg	Date
First round	First leg	1 – 9 April 2019
First round	Second leg	1 – 9 April 2019
Second round	First leg	26 August – 3 September 2019
Second round	Second leg	26 August – 3 September 2019
Third round	First leg	30 September – 8 October 2019
Third round	Second leg	30 September – 8 October 2019
Fourth round	First leg	4 – 12 November 2019
Fourth round	Second leg	4 – 12 November 2019
Fifth round	First leg	2 – 11 March 2020
Fifth round	Second leg	2 – 11 March 2020

== Bracket ==
First round
Ivory Coast	—	—	w/o
Sierra Leone	—	—
Mali	3	2	5
Morocco	1	2	3
Algeria	2	1	3
Chad	0	1	1
Ethiopia	3	1	4
Uganda	2	0	2
Tanzania	2	0	2
DR Congo	2	1	3
Gabon (p)	0	2	2 (5)
Congo	2	0	2 (3)
Malawi	11	3	14
Mozambique	1	0	1
Angola	—	—
Zambia	—	—	w/o
Botswana	1	2	3
Namibia	0	2	2

Second round
Ivory Coast	3	0	3
Mali	0	0	0
Algeria	0	0	0
Nigeria	2	1	3
Ethiopia	1	0	1
Cameroon (a)	1	0	1
DR Congo	—	—	w/o
Equatorial Guinea	—	—
Gabon	0	0	0
Ghana	3	2	5
Malawi	3	0	3
Kenya	2	3	5
Zambia (Note: Zimbabwe Football Association failed to field a side for the second leg against Zambia after its players refused to fulfill the fixture as they were owed allowances from the 2019 COSAFA Women's Championship.)	5	—	w/o
Zimbabwe	0	—
Botswana (p)	0	0	0 (3)
South Africa	0	0	0 (2)

Third round
Ivory Coast (a)	0	1	1
Nigeria	0	1	1
Cameroon	2	1	3
DR Congo	0	2	2
Ghana	0	0	0
Kenya (a.e.t.)	0	1	1
Zambia	1	2	3
Botswana	0	0	0

Fourth round
Ivory Coast	0	1	1
Cameroon	0	2	2
Kenya	2	0	2
Zambia	2	1	3

Fifth round
Cameroon	3	1	4
Zambia (a)	2	2	4

== First round ==
Team 1	Agg.	Team 2	1st leg	2nd leg
Ivory Coast	w/o	Sierra Leone	—	—
Mali	5–3	Morocco	3–1	2–2
Algeria	3–1	Chad	2–0	1–1
Ethiopia	4–2	Uganda	3–2	1–0
Tanzania	2–3	DR Congo	2–2	0–1
Gabon	2–2 (5–3 p)	Congo	0–2	2–0 (a.e.t.)
Malawi	14–1	Mozambique	11–1	3–0
Angola	w/o	Zambia	—	—
Botswana	3–2	Namibia	1–0	2–2

3 April 2019
15:30 UTC+0

Ivory Coast	Cancelled	Sierra Leone

Stade Robert Champroux, Abidjan
5 April 2019

Sierra Leone	Cancelled	Ivory Coast

Ivory Coast won on walkover due to FIFA's suspension of the Sierra Leone Football Association.

3 April 2019
17:00 UTC+0

Mali	3–1	Morocco
S. Diarra 3', 53'; Traoré 10'		Badri 54'

Stade Mamadou Konaté, Bamako
7 April 2019
16:00 UTC+1

Morocco	2–2	Mali
Jraidi 24', 82'		S. Diarra 68' (pen.); A. Diarra 90'

Stade Boubker Ammar, Salé

Mali won 5–3 on aggregate.

4 April 2019
18:00 UTC+1

Algeria	2–0	Chad
Belkhiter 20', 23'

Mustapha Tchaker Stadium, Blida
9 April 2019
15:00 UTC+1

Chad	1–1	Algeria
Larkingam 90+3' (pen.)		Affak 9'

Stade Omnisports Idriss Mahamat Ouya, N'Djamena

Algeria won 3–1 on aggregate.

3 April 2019
16:00 UTC+3

Ethiopia	3–2	Uganda
Namukisa 13' (o.g.); Abera 76'; Guta 79'		Debiso 90' (o.g.); Nassuna 90+2'

Addis Ababa Stadium, Addis Ababa
Referee: Shahenda El-Maghrabi (Egypt)
6 April 2019
16:00 UTC+3

Uganda	0–1	Ethiopia
		Abera 68'

Phillip Omondi Stadium, Kampala
Referee: Aline Umutoni (Rwanda)

Ethiopia won 4–2 on aggregate.

5 April 2019
18:00 UTC+3

Tanzania	2–2	DR Congo
Minja 47'; Rashid 79'		Kasaj 12'; Mfwamba 54'

National Stadium, Dar es Salaam
9 April 2019
16:30 UTC+1

DR Congo	1–0	Tanzania
Mfwamba 45'

Stade des Martyrs, Kinshasa

DR Congo won 3–2 on aggregate.

3 April 2019
15:30 UTC+1

Gabon	0–2	Congo
		Mahouma 38' (pen.); Moundzeli 40'

Stade Augustin Monédan de Sibang, Libreville
9 April 2019
15:30 UTC+1

Congo	0–2 (a.e.t.)	Gabon
	Report	Edzoumou 71'; Wassende 82'
Penalties
	3–5

Stade Alphonse Massemba-Débat, Brazzaville

2–2 on aggregate. Gabon won 5–3 on penalties.

4 April 2019
14:30 UTC+2

Malawi	11–1	Mozambique
Ta. Chawinga 13', 30', 90+1'; Te. Chawinga 20', 34', 36', 43', 56'; Mvula 39'; Kasenda 52', 53'	Report	Isabel 90+3'

Kamuzu Stadium, Blantyre
9 April 2019
15:00 UTC+2

Mozambique	0–3	Malawi
	Report	Te. Chawinga 51'; Ta. Chawinga 72'; Thom 82'

Estádio do Zimpeto, Maputo

Malawi won 14–1 on aggregate.

1 April 2019

Angola	Cancelled	Zambia
	Report

7 April 2019
15:00 UTC+2

Zambia	Cancelled	Angola
	Report

Nkoloma Stadium, Lusaka

Zambia won on walkover after Angola withdrew.

5 April 2019
18:00 UTC+2

Botswana	1–0	Namibia
Tholakele 81'	Report

Botswana National Stadium, Gaborone
9 April 2019
18:30 UTC+2

Namibia	2–2	Botswana
Mulunga 3'; Coleman 41'	Report	Mahlasela 10', 52'

Sam Nujoma Stadium, Windhoek

Botswana won 3–2 on aggregate.

== Second round ==
Team 1	Agg.	Team 2	1st leg	2nd leg
Ivory Coast	3–0	Mali	3–0	0–0
Algeria	0–3	Nigeria	0–2	0–1
Ethiopia	1–1 (a)	Cameroon	1–1	0–0
DR Congo	w/o	Equatorial Guinea	—	—
Gabon	0–5	Ghana	0–3	0–2
Malawi	3–5	Kenya	3–2	0–3
Zambia	w/o	Zimbabwe	5–0	—
Botswana	0–0 (3–2 p)	South Africa	0–0	0–0 (a.e.t.)

31 August 2019
15:30 UTC+0

Ivory Coast	3–0	Mali
Nrehy 45+2'; N'Guessan 61'; Elloh 81'

Parc des Sports, Treichville
Referee: Incaf El Harkaoui (Morocco)
3 September 2019
16:00 UTC+0

Mali	0–0	Ivory Coast

Stade Mamadou Konaté, Bamako

Ivory Coast won 3–0 on aggregate.

28 August 2019
19:00 UTC+1

Algeria	0–2	Nigeria
		Ouadah 15' (o.g.); Okoronkwo 54'

Mustapha Tchaker Stadium, Blida
3 September 2019
16:00 UTC+1

Nigeria	1–0	Algeria
Oshoala 57'

Agege Stadium, Lagos

Nigeria won 3–0 on aggregate.

26 August 2019
14:00 UTC+3

Ethiopia	1–1	Cameroon
Bogale 82'		Abam 52'

Bahir Dar Stadium, Bahir Dar
3 September 2019
15:30 UTC+1

Cameroon	0–0	Ethiopia

Ahmadou Ahidjo Stadium, Yaoundé
Referee: Anaelle Omanda (Gabon)

1–1 on aggregate. Cameroon won on away goals.

28 August 2019
--:-- UTC+1

DR Congo	Cancelled	Equatorial Guinea

Stade des Martyrs, Kinshasa
1 September 2019
--:-- UTC+1

Equatorial Guinea	Cancelled	DR Congo

Referee: Juliet Appiah (Ghana)

DR Congo won on walkover after Equatorial Guinea withdrew.

28 August 2019
15:30 UTC+1

Gabon	0–3	Ghana
		Acheampong 45'; Boakye 70'; Okyere 90'

Stade Augustin Monédan, Libreville
Referee: Vincentia Amedome (Togo)
3 September 2019
15:30 UTC+0

Ghana	2–0	Gabon
Boakye 16'; Acheampong 70'

Accra Sports Stadium, Accra

Ghana won 5–0 on aggregate.

28 August 2019
14:30 UTC+2

Malawi	3–2	Kenya
Nguluwe 13'; Ta. Chawinga 36', 40' (pen.)		Shilwatso 24'; Wambui 81'

Kamuzu Stadium, Blantyre
Referee: Thanks Nyahuye (Zimbabwe)
1 September 2019
13:00 UTC+3

Kenya	3–0	Malawi
Shilwatso 19'; Adam 77', 88'

Kenyatta Stadium, Machakos
Referee: Shamirah Nabadda (Uganda)

Kenya won 5–3 on aggregate.

28 August 2019
15:00 UTC+2

Zambia	5–0	Zimbabwe
Zulu 50'; Chanda 73', 79', 86'; Kundananji 89'

Nkoloma Stadium, Lusaka
1 September 2019
15:00 UTC+2

Zimbabwe	Cancelled	Zambia

National Sports Stadium, Harare

Zambia won on walkover after Zimbabwe failed to arrive for the second leg.

30 August 2019
19:00 UTC+2

Botswana	0–0	South Africa

National Stadium, Gaborone
3 September 2019
19:00 UTC+2

South Africa	0–0 (a.e.t.)	Botswana
Penalties
Smeda (penalty scored); Ramalepe (penalty missed); Makhabane (penalty missed); Mbane (penalty scored); Jane (penalty missed)	2–3	(penalty scored) Radiakanyo; (penalty scored) Gaofetoge; (penalty missed) Tholakele; (penalty missed) Mokgabo; (penalty scored) Bosija

Orlando Stadium, Johannesburg

0–0 on aggregate. Botswana won 3–2 on penalties.

== Third round ==
Team 1	Agg.	Team 2	1st leg	2nd leg
Ivory Coast	1–1 (a)	Nigeria	0–0	1–1
Cameroon	3–2	DR Congo	2–0	1–2
Ghana	0–1	Kenya	0–0	0–1 (a.e.t.)
Zambia	3–0	Botswana	1–0	2–0

3 October 2019
15:30 UTC+0

Ivory Coast	0–0	Nigeria

Parc des Sports, Treichville
Referee: Vincentia Amedome (Togo)
7 October 2019
16:00 UTC+1

Nigeria	1–1	Ivory Coast
Oshoala 34'		Kpaho 12'

Agege Stadium, Lagos
Referee: Juliet Appiah (Ghana)

1–1 on aggregate. Ivory Coast won on away goals.

3 October 2019
15:30 UTC+1

Cameroon	2–0	DR Congo
Meyong 28'; Nchout 30'

Ahmadou Ahidjo Stadium, Yaoundé
Referee: Patience Madu (Nigeria)
8 October 2019
16:00 UTC+1

DR Congo	2–1	Cameroon
Diakese 11'; Kasaj 42'		Nchout 82'

Stade des Martyrs, Kinshasa

Cameroon won 3–2 on aggregate.

4 October 2019
15:30 UTC+0

Ghana	0–0	Kenya

Accra Sports Stadium, Accra
8 October 2019
16:00 UTC+3

Kenya	1–0 (a.e.t.)	Ghana
Shikangwa 99' (pen.)

Moi International Sports Centre, Kasarani

Kenya won 1–0 on aggregate.

2 October 2019
15:00 UTC+2

Zambia	1–0	Botswana
Mwakapila 21'

Nkoloma Stadium, Lusaka
8 October 2019
19:00 UTC+2

Botswana	0–2	Zambia
		Chanda 18', 53'

Francistown Stadium, Francistown

Zambia won 3–0 on aggregate.

== Fourth round ==
Team 1	Agg.	Team 2	1st leg	2nd leg
Ivory Coast	1–2	Cameroon	0–0	1–2
Kenya	2–3	Zambia	2–2	0–1

9 November 2019
15:30 UTC+0

Ivory Coast	0–0	Cameroon

Parc des sports, Treichville
12 November 2019
15:30 UTC+1

Cameroon	2–1	Ivory Coast
Meyong 28'; Nchout 84' (pen.)		Elloh 47'

Ahmadou Ahidjo Stadium, Yaoundé
Referee: Akhona Makalima (South Africa)

Cameroon won 2–1 on aggregate.

8 November 2019
16:00 UTC+3

Kenya	2–2	Zambia
Tembo 30' (o.g.); Corazone 71'		Chanda 13'; Kundananji 72'

Moi International Sports Centre, Kasarani
Referee: Shamirah Nabadda (Uganda)
11 November 2019
15:00 UTC+2

Zambia	1–0	Kenya
Mweemba 57'

Nkoloma Stadium, Lusaka

Zambia won 3–2 on aggregate.

== Fifth round ==
The winner qualified for the 2020 Summer Olympics, while the loser entered a play-off against a team from CONMEBOL.

Team 1	Agg.	Team 2	1st leg	2nd leg
Cameroon	4–4 (a)	Zambia	3–2	1–2

5 March 2020
15:30 UTC+1

Cameroon	3–2	Zambia
Nchout 41'; Onguéné 71', 89'	Report	Chanda 35', 74'

Ahmadou Ahidjo Stadium, Yaoundé
Referee: Bouchra Karboubi (Morocco)
10 March 2020
15:00 UTC+2

Zambia	2–1	Cameroon
Mwakapila 10'; Mubanga 42'	Report	Nchout 87'

Nkoloma Stadium, Lusaka

4–4 on aggregate. Zambia won on away goals.

== Qualified teams for Summer Olympics ==
The following team from CAF qualified for the 2020 Summer Olympic women's football tournament. Cameroon failed to qualify after they lost the play-off against the 2018 Copa América Femenina second-placed team, Chile.

Team	Qualified on	Previous appearances in Summer Olympics^{2}
Zambia	10 March 2020	0 (debut)

^{2} Bold indicates champions for that year. Italic indicates hosts for that year.

== Goalscorers ==
There were 100 goals scored in 41 matches, for an average of 2.44 goals per match.

8 goals

- (Zambia) Grace Chanda

6 goals

- (Malawi) Tabitha Chawinga
- (Malawi) Temwa Chawinga

5 goals

- (Cameroon) Ajara Nchout

3 goals

- (Mali) Salimata Diarra

2 goals

- (Algeria) Morgane Belkhiter
- (Botswana) Nondi Mahlasela
- (Cameroon) Charlène Meyong
- (Cameroon) Gabrielle Onguéné
- (Democratic Republic of the Congo) Marlène Kasaj
- (Democratic Republic of the Congo) Grâce Mfwamba
- (Ethiopia) Loza Abera
- (Ghana) Juliet Acheampong
- (Ghana) Portia Boakye
- (Ivory Coast) Rebecca Elloh
- (Kenya) Mwanalima Adam
- (Kenya) Cynthia Shilwatso
- (Malawi) Linda Kasenda
- (Morocco) Ibtissam Jraidi
- (Nigeria) Asisat Oshoala
- (Zambia) Racheal Kundananji
- (Zambia) Mary Mwakapila

1 goal

- (Algeria) Houria Affak
- (Botswana) Refilwe Tholakele
- (Cameroon) Michaela Abam
- (Chad) Solange Larkingam
- (Republic of the Congo) Paulmiche Mahouma
- (Republic of the Congo) Charmelle Moundzeli
- (Democratic Republic of the Congo) Isa Diakese
- (Ethiopia) Senait Bogale
- (Ethiopia) Serkaddis Guta
- (Gabon) Reine Edzoumou
- (Gabon) Doris Wassende
- (Ghana) Priscilla Okyere
- (Ivory Coast) Nina Kpaho
- (Ivory Coast) Ange N'Guessan
- (Ivory Coast) Ines Nrehy
- (Kenya) Vivian Corazone
- (Kenya) Jentrix Shikangwa
- (Kenya) Elizabeth Wambui
- (Malawi) Wezzie Mvula
- (Malawi) Madina Nguluwe
- (Malawi) Sabina Thom
- (Mali) Agueissa Diarra
- (Mali) Aissata Traoré
- (Morocco) Najat Badri
- (Mozambique) Isabel Jorge
- (Namibia) Zenatha Coleman
- (Namibia) Lovisa Mulunga
- (Nigeria) Amarachi Okoronkwo
- (Tanzania) Donisia Minja
- (Tanzania) Asha Rashid
- (Uganda) Hasifah Nassuna
- (Zambia) Hellen Mubanga
- (Zambia) Lushomo Mweemba
- (Zambia) Misozi Zulu

1 own goal

- (Algeria) Isma Ouadah (against Nigeria)
- (Ethiopia) Tarikuwa Debiso (against Uganda)
- (Uganda) Aisha Namukisa (against Ethiopia)
- (Zambia) Martha Tembo (against Kenya)
