= Niakaté =

Niakaté is a French surname that may refer to

- Kalidiatou Niakaté (born 1995), French handball player
- Modibo Niakaté (born 1981), French basketball player
- Youssouf Niakaté (born 1992), French association football player
- Sikou Niakaté (born 1999), French association football player
- Yakaré Niakaté (born 1997), French association football player
