= Uchenna Kanu =

Nigerian footballer (born 1997)

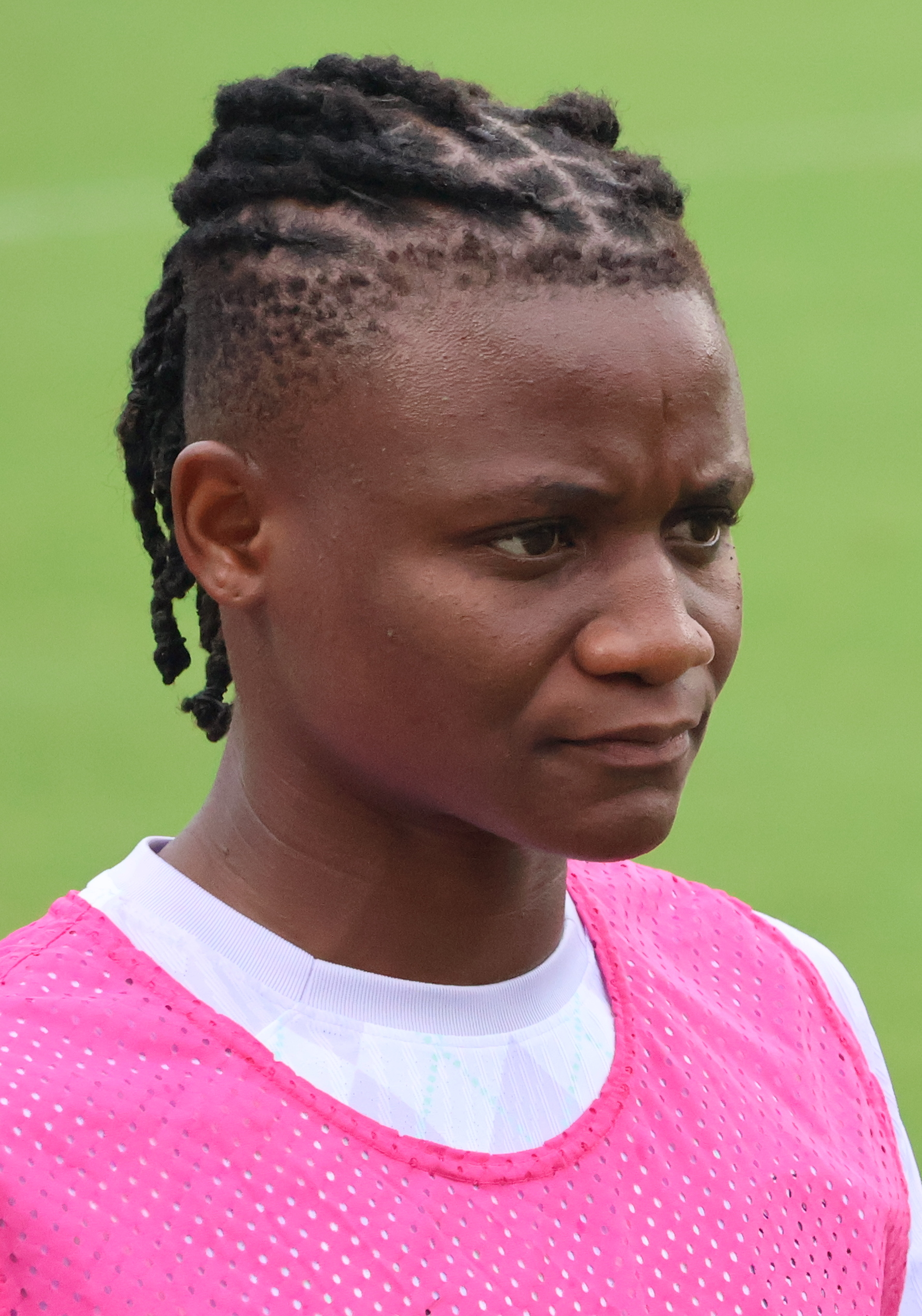
- Kanu with Racing Louisville in 2024

Personal information
- Full name: Uchenna Grace Kanu
- Date of birth: 20 June 1997 (age 29)
- Place of birth: Abia, Nigeria
- Height: 1.73 m (5 ft 8 in)
- Position: Forward

Team information
- Current team: Cruz Azul
- Number: 29

College career
Years	Team	Apps	(Gls)
2016–2019	Southeastern Fire	78	(157)

Senior career*
Years	Team	Apps	(Gls)
2018–2020	Pensacola FC	12	(17)
2020	Sevilla	4	(0)
2020–2021	Linköpings FC	42	(22)
2022–2023	Tigres UANL	30	(20)
2023–2025	Racing Louisville	35	(6)
2026–	Cruz Azul	13	(10)

International career^{‡}
2014	Nigeria U17	4	(3)
2014	Nigeria U20	3	(0)
2019–	Nigeria	45	(25)
- * Club domestic league appearances and goals as of 16 August 2026 ‡ National team caps and goals as of 16 October 2026

Uchenna Grace Kanu ( ;born 20 June 1997) is a Nigerian professional footballer who plays as a forward for Liga Femenil club Cruz Azul and Nigeria national team.

== Career ==
On 3 December 2021, Kanu was announced at Tigres UANL. In joining Tigres, she became the first African player to play in the Liga MX Femenil.

On 2 February 2023, Kanu was announced at Racing Louisville on a two-year contract with an option for an extra year. In exchange for Kanu, Racing Louisville used allocation money to pay a transfer free, and loaned Riley Parker to Tigres UANL.

== International career ==
Kanu represented Nigeria at the 2014 FIFA U-17 Women's World Cup and the 2014 FIFA U-20 Women's World Cup. She made her senior debut on 8 April 2019 in a 1–2 friendly loss to Canada.

On 24 May 2019, Kanu was called up to the Nigeria squad for the 2019 FIFA Women's World Cup.

Kanu was called up to the Nigeria squad for the 2022 Women's Africa Cup of Nations.

On 16 June 2023, she was included in the 23-player Nigerian squad for the FIFA Women's World Cup 2023.

Kanu was called up to the Nigeria squad for the 2024 Summer Olympics.

== Personal life ==
In her earlier years, at the age of 26, she shared her journey, saying, "I used to sell oranges and water on the streets of Aba. My brother and I would hawk sodas like Coca-Cola, Fanta, and Pepsi in the market. We'd cross paths, share a laugh, and then go our separate ways." Now, Kanu excels as a forward for NWSL club Racing Louisville in the United States, having risen to prominence through her representation of Nigeria in various FIFA Women's World Cups.

== Career statistics ==
=== International goals ===
No.	Date	Venue	Opponent	Score	Result	Competition
1	9 May 2019	Stade Robert Champroux de Macory, Abidjan, Ivory Coast	Burkina Faso	1-0	5-1	2019 WAFU Zone B Women's Cup
2	9 May 2019	Stade Robert Champroux de Macory, Abidjan, Ivory Coast	Burkina Faso	4-1	5-1	2019 WAFU Zone B Women's Cup
3	9 May 2019	Stade Robert Champroux de Macory, Abidjan, Ivory Coast	Burkina Faso	5-1	5-1	2019 WAFU Zone B Women's Cup
4	11 May 2019	Stade Robert Champroux de Macory, Abidjan, Ivory Coast	Niger	2-0	15-0	2019 WAFU Zone B Women's Cup
5	11 May 2019	Stade Robert Champroux de Macory, Abidjan, Ivory Coast	Niger	3-0	15-0	2019 WAFU Zone B Women's Cup
6	11 May 2019	Stade Robert Champroux de Macory, Abidjan, Ivory Coast	Niger	6-0	15-0	2019 WAFU Zone B Women's Cup
7	11 May 2019	Stade Robert Champroux de Macory, Abidjan, Ivory Coast	Niger	7-0	15-0	2019 WAFU Zone B Women's Cup
8	11 May 2019	Stade Robert Champroux de Macory, Abidjan, Ivory Coast	Niger	11-0	15-0	2019 WAFU Zone B Women's Cup
9	14 May 2019	Stade Robert Champroux de Macory, Abidjan, Ivory Coast	Mali	2-0	2-0	2019 WAFU Zone B Women's Cup
10	18 May 2019	Stade Robert Champroux de Macory, Abidjan, Ivory Coast	Ivory Coast	1-1	1-1	2019 WAFU Zone B Women's Cup
11	23 February 2021	Arslan Zeki Demirci Sports Complex, Ilıca, Turkey	Equatorial Guinea	5–0	9–0	2021 Turkish Women's Cup
12	20 October 2021	Onikan Stadium, Lagos, Nigeria	Ghana	1–0	2–0	2022 Women's Africa Cup of Nations qualification
13	20 October 2021	Onikan Stadium, Lagos, Nigeria	Ghana	2–0	2–0	2022 Women's Africa Cup of Nations qualification
14	10 July 2022	Stade Moulay Hassan, Rabat, Morocco	Burundi	3–0	4–0	2022 Women's Africa Cup of Nations
15	10 July 2022	Stade Moulay Hassan, Rabat, Morocco	Burundi	4–0	4–0	2022 Women's Africa Cup of Nations
16	6 September 2022	Audi Field, Washington D.C., United States	United States	1–1	1–2	Friendly
17	27 July 2023	Lang Park, Brisbane, Australia	Australia	1–1	3–2	2023 FIFA Women's World Cup
18	31 October 2023	MKO Abiola Stadium, Abuja, Nigeria	Ethiopia	1–0	4–0	2024 CAF Women's Olympic Qualifying Tournament
19	30 November 2023	MKO Abiola Stadium, Abuja, Nigeria	Cape Verde	1-0	5-0	2024 Women's Africa Cup of Nations qualification
20	30 November 2023	MKO Abiola Stadium, Abuja, Nigeria	Cape Verde	3-0	5-0	2024 Women's Africa Cup of Nations qualification
21	28 July 2026	Al Medina Stadium, Rabat, Morocco	Malawi	2–3	2−3	2026 Women's Africa Cup of Nations
22	5 August 2026	Rabat Olympic Stadium, Rabat, Morocco	Egypt	3–1	6−2	2026 Women's Africa Cup of Nations
23	9 October 2026	Remo Stars Stadium, Ikenne, Nigeria	Comoros	2–0	2−0	2028 CAF Women's Olympic qualifying tournament
24	13 October 2026	Remo Stars Stadium, Ikenne, Nigeria	Comoros	2–0	5−0	2028 CAF Women's Olympic qualifying tournament
25	13 October 2026	Remo Stars Stadium, Ikenne, Nigeria	Comoros	4–0	5−0	2028 CAF Women's Olympic qualifying tournament
