= Augustine Ngo Mback =

Cameroonian footballer

Personal information
- Full name: Augustine Chouchou Ngo Mback Batoum
- Date of birth: 1 July 1997 (age 29)
- Place of birth: Cameroon
- Height: 1.66 m (5 ft 5 in)
- Position: Left midfielder

Team information
- Current team: Louves Miniproff

Senior career*
| Years | Team | Apps | (Gls) |
- Louves Miniproff

International career^{‡}
| 2016– | Cameroon | 4 | (0) |
- * Club domestic league appearances and goals ‡ National team caps and goals as of 10 March 2020

Augustine Chouchou Ngo Mback Batoum (born 1 July 1997) is a Cameroonian footballer who plays as a left midfielder for Louves Miniproff and the Cameroon women's national team.

== Club career ==
Ngo Mback has played for Louves Miniproff in Cameroon.

== International career ==
Ngo Mback capped for Cameroon at senior level during the 2016 Africa Women Cup of Nations and the 2020 CAF Women's Olympic Qualifying Tournament.
