= Christa Kgamphe =

South African sports administrator/agent

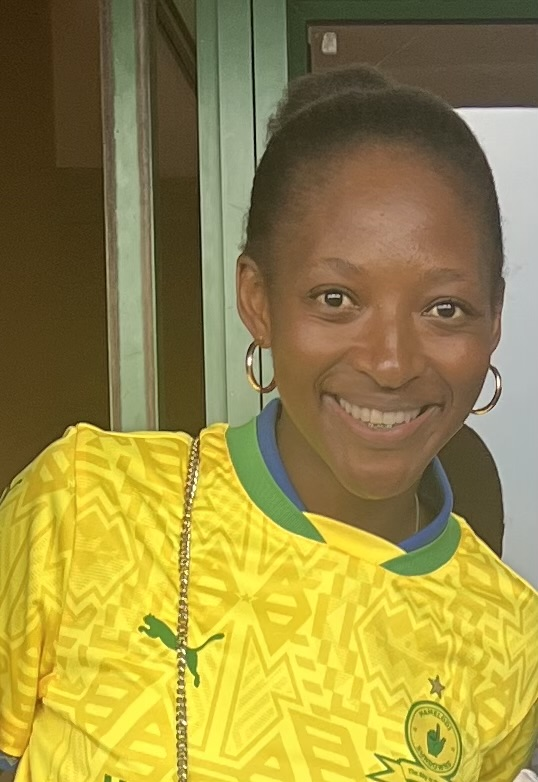
- Kgamphe in 2024
- Born: Christa Boitumelo Flora Kgamphe; 25 December 1986; Rustenburg
- Other names: Christa Kgamphe-Jane
- Education: Masters in Sport Management, University of Johannesburg (2022)
- Employer(s): Tshwane University of Technology (lecturer); Mamelodi Sundowns Ladies (head of women's football)
- Television: Sports Wives
- Spouse: Refiloe Jane (m. 2021)
- Website: IG.com/chrissielola

Christa Boitumelo Flora Kgamphe (born 25 December 1986) is a South African lecturer, sports masseuse, coach, talent manager, and sports administrator who is the current head of women's football at Mamelodi Sundowns Ladies.

== Personal life ==
Kgamphe is married to South African soccer player Refiloe Jane who she also manages. Their wedding was held on 18 June 2021.

In 2022, she graduated with a Masters in Sport Management from the University of Johannesburg.

== Sports ==
Kgamphe joined football management company LTA Agency in 2020.

In March 2024, Kgamphe was appointed the Head of Women's Football at Mamelodi Sundowns Ladies.

== Other works ==
She lectured Sports Management at the Tshwane University of Technology.

In 2023, she starred in the Ndlovukazi Concepts show Sports Wives. The show gave a glimpse into the lives of South African WAG's.
