= Coline Bouby =

French footballer (born 1998)

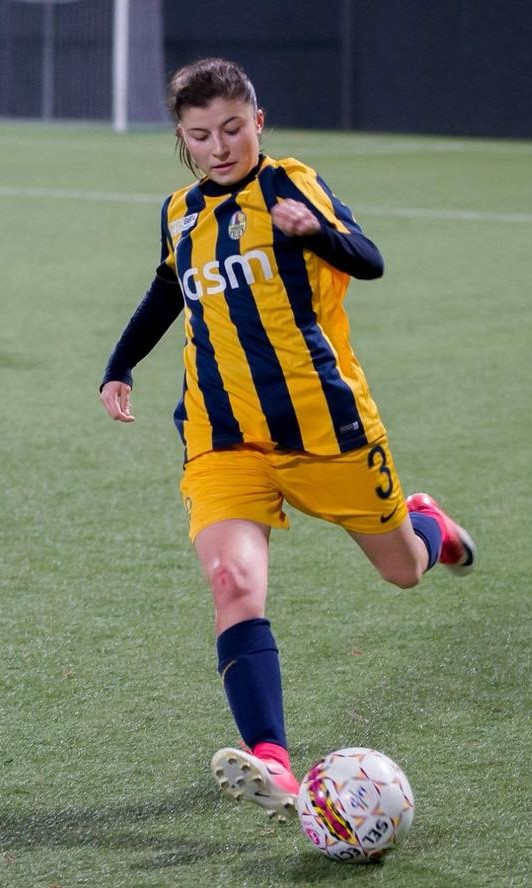
- Bouby with Hellas Verona in 2018

Personal information
- Full name: Coline Zoe Mary Bouby
- Date of birth: 14 August 1998 (age 28)
- Place of birth: Saint-Mandé, France
- Height: 1.62 m (5 ft 4 in)
- Position: Defender

Team information
- Current team: Nice
- Number: 21

Youth career
- Paris Saint-Germain

Senior career*
Years	Team	Apps	(Gls)
2017	Nîmes	4	(0)
2017–2018	Hellas Verona		
2018–2020	Ravenna		
2020–	Nice	82	(2)
- * Club domestic league appearances and goals as of 3 May 2026

Coline Zoe Mary Bouby (born 14 August 1998) is a French footballer who plays as a defender for Seconde Ligue club OGC Nice.

== Career ==
Coline Bouby transferred to Serie A side Verona on December 12, 2017 after starting her career at the French side FF Nîmes MG. In the summer of 2018, she signed with her new club Ravenna Women and left after 2 seasons.

On February 11, 2020, Bouby joined OGC Nice five days later Bouby would score her first goal for the club.
