= Bintou Camara =

Malian football manager

Managerial career
- Years: Team
- Mali

Bintou Camara is a Malian football manager and former footballer.

== Early life ==
According to one pundit, Camara "first acquired her notoriety as a player, notably in clubs with evocative names like Les Tigresses or the Super Lionnes before landing at AS Mandé. It is here that she will show off her first coaching stripes in 2009".

== Career ==
Camara managed the Mali women's national football team, where she was tasked with reaching the semifinals of the 2018 Women's Africa Cup of Nations and achieving qualification to the 2019 FIFA Women's World Cup.

== Personal life ==
Camara obtained a master's degree in physical education.
