= OGC Nice (women) =

Nice
- Full name: Olympique Gymnaste Club de Nice
- Nicknames: Les Aiglons (The Eaglets), Le Gym (The Gym)
- Founded: 9 September 2005; 21 years ago
- Owner: Ineos
- President: Jean-Pierre Rivère
- League: Seconde Ligue
- 2025–26: Seconde Ligue, 8th of 12
- Website: https://www.ogcnice.com
Home colours	Away colours

OGC Nice is a French football club based in Nice, which plays in the Seconde Ligue. The club is the women's side of the French football club of the same name and was founded in 2005.

== Players ==
=== Current squad ===
As of 29 December 2024

Note: Flags indicate national team as defined under FIFA eligibility rules; some limited exceptions apply. Players may hold more than one non-FIFA nationality.

No.	Pos.	Nation	Player
1	GK	FRA	Noa Gaumet
2	DF	FRA	Marina Rousseau
3	DF	FRA	Estelle Laurier
4	DF	FRA	Julie Marichaud
5	DF	FRA	Clara Galli
6	MF	FRA	Fiona Brandazzi
7	MF	FRA	Morgane De Seixas
8	MF	FRA	Jade Prault
9	FW	FRA	Inès Barrier
10	FW	FRA	Joséphine Palin
11	MF	FRA	Rachel Robert
13	FW	COD	Anastasia Soulac
14	FW	FRA	Léa Rosenberger
15	FW	FRA	Naomie Gribel

No.	Pos.	Nation	Player
16	GK	FRA	Lana Levaux
17	MF	FRA	Léa Ducarin
19	FW	FRA	Yrma Mze Issa
20	FW	CIV	Angela Malaussena
21	DF	FRA	Coline Bouby
22	DF	MAR	Jade Mokhtari
23	DF	FRA	Mellie Lacolla
24	MF	POR	Léa Cassagne
25	FW	FRA	Manon Ceresola
27	DF	MLI	Yakaré Niakaté
30	GK	FRA	Lina-Lou Nicolas
33	DF	FRA	Pauline Vinciguerra
40	GK	FRA	Pauline Lemière
99	GK	FRA	Maureen Saint-Léger
