= Morgane Belkhiter =

Algerian footballer (born 1995)

Personal information
- Date of birth: 23 November 1995 (age 30)
- Place of birth: La Ciotat, France
- Height: 1.70 m (5 ft 7 in)
- Position: Defender

Team information
- Current team: Saint-Étienne (on loan from Le Havre)
- Number: 21

Youth career
- 2008–2011: ES Pennoise
- 2013–2014: AS Marzargues

Senior career*
Years	Team	Apps	(Gls)
2015–2017	Nîmes	26	(1)
2017–2018	ASPTT Albi	18	(0)
2018	Marseille	1	(0)
2019–2021	Metz	18	(0)
2021–2022	Brest	21	(4)
2022–2023	Soyaux	22	(3)
2023–2024	Le Havre	1	(0)
2023–2024	→ AS Saint-Étienne (loan)	12	(0)
2024–2026	AS Saint-Étienne	26	(0)
2026–	Saint-Malo	4	(0)

International career^{‡}
2018–	Algeria	23	(3)
- * Club domestic league appearances and goals as of 16 October 2026 ‡ National team caps and goals as of 20 June 2019

Morgane Belkhiter (born 23 November 1995) is a professional footballer who plays as a defender for Première Ligue club Saint-Malo. Born in France, she plays for the Algeria women's national team. She competed at the 2018 Women's Africa Cup of Nations, playing in two matches.

== Youth career ==
Belkhiter started her career at ES Pennoise, and after a two-year break, joined AS Marzargues.

== Career ==
=== ASPTT Albi ===
In 2017, she joined Albi. She made her league debut against Bordeaux on 10 September 2017.

=== Metz ===
On 18 January 2019, Belkhiter was announced at Metz. She made her league debut against Soyaux on 2 February 2019.

=== Brest ===
On 28 June 2021, Belkhiter was announced at Brest.

=== Soyaux ===
Belkhiter made her league debut against PSG on 9 September 2022. She scored her first league goal against Le Havre on 15 October 2022, scoring in the 49th minute.

=== Le Havre ===
On 30 June 2023, Belkhiter was announced at Le Havre. She made her league debut against Paris FC on 6 October 2023.

=== Loan to AS Saint-Étienne ===
On 7 December 2023, Belkhiter was announced at Saint-Étienne. She made her league debut against EA Guingamp on 9 December 2023.

=== AS Saint-Étienne ===
After impressing in her initial loan deal, Belkhiter signed permanently for Saint-Étienne.

== International career ==
Belkhiter was called up to the Algerian national team for the first time in November 2018. On October 19, 2021, she was called up to the squad for qualifying matches for the 2022 Women's Africa Cup of Nations.
