= Sebe Coulibaly =

Footballer (born 1994)

Personal information
- Full name: Sebe Coulibaly
- Date of birth: 9 February 1994 (age 32)
- Place of birth: Paris, France
- Positions: Midfielder; forward

Team information
- Current team: RC Saint-Denis

Senior career*
Years	Team	Apps	(Gls)
2008–2015	Tremblay FC		
2015–2016	AS Saint-Étienne	2	(0)
2016	Tremblay FC		
2017–	RC Saint-Denis		

International career
- Mali
- * Club domestic league appearances and goals

Sebe Coulibaly (born 9 February 1994) is a footballer who plays as a midfielder for RC Saint-Denis. Born in France, she plays for Mali women's national team.

She played for Mali at the 2016 Africa Women Cup of Nations, scoring for Mali in the match against Kenya.

She has played for RC Saint-Denis since 2017. She had previously played for Tremblay FC and AS Saint-Étienne.
