= Saratou Traoré =

Malian footballer (born 2002)

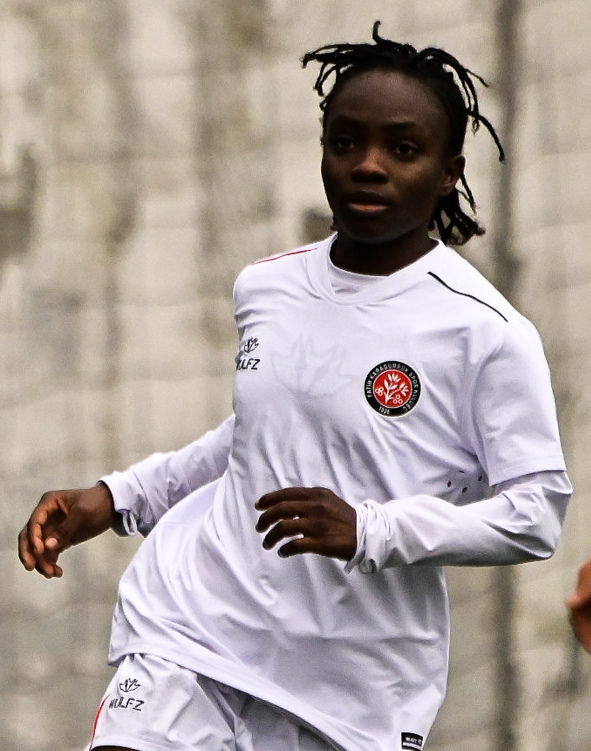
- Saratou Traoré of Fatih Karagümrük (January 2024)

Personal information
- Full name: Bassira Touré
- Date of birth: 27 September 2002 (age 24)
- Place of birth: Nioro du Sahel, Kayes Region, Mali
- Height: 1.56 m (5 ft 1 1/2 in)
- Position: Midfielder

Team information
- Current team: Fatih Karagümrük
- Number: 10

Senior career*
Years	Team	Apps	(Gls)
- Super Lionnes d’Hamdallay
2021–	Fatih Karagümrük	26	(16)

International career
	Mali	2	(0)
- * Club domestic league appearances and goals as of 16 October 2022

Saratou Traoré (born 27 September 2002) is a Malian footballer, who plays as a midfielder for Fatih Karagümrük in the Turkish Women's Super League and the Mali women's national team.

== Club career ==
Traoré played as attacking midfielder for Super Lionnes d’Hamdallay in her country. She enjoyed her team's runners-up rank in the Mali Women's National Football Championship and the champions title in the 2020-21 Mali Women's Football Cup.

By December 2021, she moved to Turkey, and signed with the newly established Women's Super League club Fatih Karagümrük in Istanbul. She scored 15 goals in 25 matches of the 2021-22 Women's Super League season.

== International career ==
She is a member of the Mali women's national team.

== Career statistics ==
As of 16 October 2022

Club	Season	League			Continental		National		Total	
Club	Season	Division	Apps	Goals	Apps	Goals	Apps	Goals	Apps	Goals
Fatih Karagümrük	2021–22	Super League	25	15	-	-	0	0	25	15
Fatih Karagümrük	2022–23	Super League	1	1	-	-	0	0	1	1
Fatih Karagümrük	Total		26	16	-	-	0	0	26	16
Career total			26	16	6	2	0	0	26	16
