= Bintou Koité =

Malian footballer (born 1995)

Personal information
- Date of birth: 20 November 1995 (age 30)
- Position: Midfielder

Team information
- Current team: Raja Casablanca
- Number: 15

International career^{‡}
Years	Team	Apps	(Gls)
2016–	Mali	20	(0)
- ‡ National team caps and goals as of 11 June 2019

Bintou Koité (born 20 November 1995) is a Malian international footballer who plays as a midfielder for the Mali women's national football team. She competed for Mali at the 2016 and 2018 Africa Women Cup of Nations.
