= Fatou Dembele =

Malian footballer (born 2000)

Personal information
- Date of birth: 30 November 2000 (age 25)
- Place of birth: Bamako, Mali
- Height: 1.76 m (5 ft 9 in)
- Positions: Defensive midfielder; right winger

Team information
- Current team: UD Tenerife
- Number: 25

Senior career*
Years	Team	Apps	(Gls)
2019–2021	Les Amazones C.V		
2021–2022	Itihad Tanger		
2023	Fenerbahçe	8	(0)
2023	Kryvbas Kryvyi Rih		
2023	AS Mandé	3	(0)
2023–2024	AS FAR	12	(2)
2024–	UD Tenerife	14	(1)

International career
2019	Mali U20		
2020–	Mali		
- * Club domestic league appearances and goals

Fatou Dembele (born 30 November 2000) is a Malian professional footballer who plays as a right winger for Liga F club UD Tenerife and the Mali national team.

== Club career ==
In October 2021, Dembele joined Moroccan Women's Championship D1 side Itihad Tanger on a 3-year contract. In December 2021, she made history by scoring the fastest goal in the league's history, just 37 seconds into the match.

In December 2022, Dembele signed her first professional contract with Turkish club Fenerbahçe.

Having joined AS Mandé in October 2023, She played the 2023 CAF Women's Champions League with the club.

She played a key role in AS FAR's eleventh league title, scoring 12 goals and providing two assists in 12 appearances.

In September 2024, Fatou joined Costa Adeje Tenerife Egatesa in La Liga F.

== International career ==
In August 2019, Fatou represented Mali at under-20 level during the 2019 African Games held in Morocco. Six months later She got her first call-up to the senior team for the 2020 WAFU Zone A Women's Cup held in Sierra Leone. She scored her first international goal on 30 November 2023, in a 7–2 victory over Guinea during the 2024 Women's Africa Cup of Nations qualification.

== International goals ==
Scores and results list Mali's goal tally first, score column indicates score after each Dembele goal.

No.	Date	Venue	Opponent	Score	Result	Competition
1	30 November 2023	Stade du 26 Mars, Bamako, Mali	Guinea	2–0	7–2	2024 WAFCON qualifiers
2	20 February 2025	Stade de Franceville, Franceville, Gabon	Gabon	5–0	6–0	2026 WAFCON qualifiers
3	26 May 2025	Cheikha Ould Boïdiya Stadium, Nouakchott, Mauritania	Liberia	1–0	1–1	2025 WAFU Zone A Women's Cup
