= Isabelle Mambingo =

Cameroonian footballer

Personal information
- Full name: Isabelle Mireille Mambingo Mambingo
- Date of birth: 10 April 1985 (age 41)
- Height: 1.71 m (5 ft 7 in)
- Position: Goalkeeper

Team information
- Current team: Sunshine Queens

Senior career*
Years	Team	Apps	(Gls)
- Sunshine Queens

International career^{‡}
2015–	Cameroon	1+	(0)
- * Club domestic league appearances and goals ‡ National team caps and goals as of 7 September 2015

Isabelle Mireille Mambingo Mambingo (born 10 April 1985) is a Cameroonian footballer who plays as a goalkeeper for Sunshine Queens and the Cameroon women's national team.

== Club career ==
Mambingo played for Nigerian Women Premier League club Sunshine Queens FC.

== International career ==
Mambingo played for Cameroon at senior level in the 2015 African Games.
