= Aldiglade Bhamu =

Zimbabwean footballer (1987–2022)

Personal information
- Date of birth: 26 November 1987
- Date of death: 26 May 2022 (aged 34)
- Place of death: Harare, Zimbabwe
- Position: Midfielder

Senior career*
Years	Team	Apps	(Gls)
- Mufakose Queens

International career
- Zimbabwe
- * Club domestic league appearances and goals

Aldiglade Bhamu (26 November 1987 – 26 May 2022) was a Zimbabwean footballer who played as a midfielder.

== Club career ==
Bhamu was part of the Mighty Warriors squad that featured at the 2016 Women Africa Cup of Nations in Cameroon. She also played for Mufakose Queens and Harare City Queens where she established herself as one of the top players in the Zimbabwe National Women's Soccer League. At the time of her death, Bhamu was still an integral member of the Rosemary Mugadza-coached Harare City Queens.

The veteran player was also a part-time coach for the girls team at the BN Academy. Veteran coach, Langton Giwa, said he started working with Bhamu when she was in Form 1 at Mufakose High 3. "She once went to play for Black Rhinos Queens and then came to Harare City, and she was working with coach Rosemary Mugadza and I was with the junior team," said Giwa. Bhamu began her career as a right-back before she was later converted into a midfielder. She also featured for the national Under-20 side as well as the Mighty Warriors.

== International career ==
Bhamu capped for Zimbabwe at senior level during the 2016 Africa Women Cup of Nations. Aldiglade Bhamu was a Zimbabwean footballer who played as a midfielder for Zimbabwe women's national team.

== Death ==
Bhamu died at hospital on 26 May 2022, at the age of 34, after collapsing at her family home in Harare.
