= Bassira Touré =

Malian footballer (born 1990)

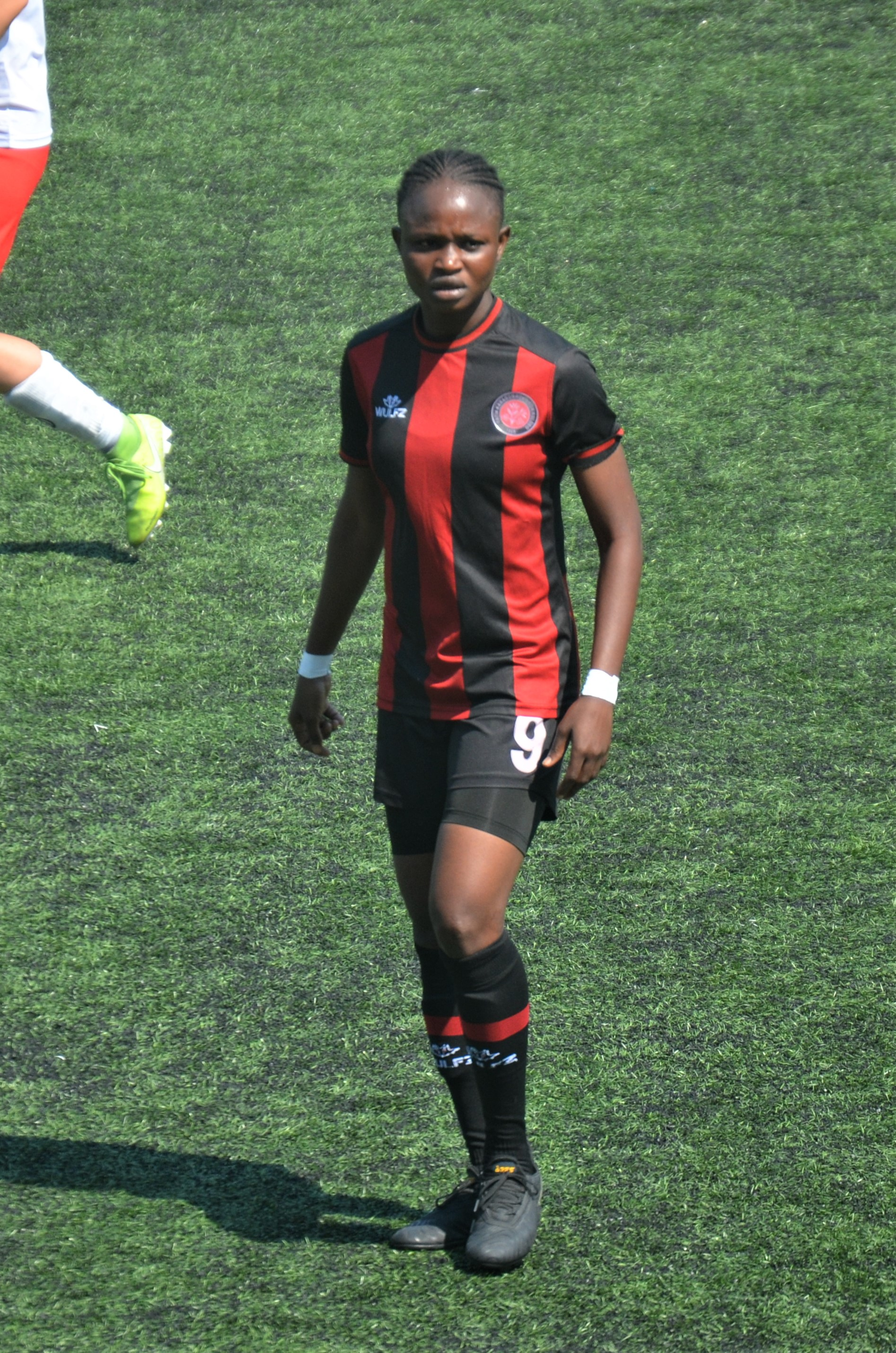
- Bassira Touré of Fatih Karagümrük (May 2022)

Personal information
- Full name: Bassira Touré
- Date of birth: 6 January 1990 (age 36)
- Place of birth: Bozola, Bamako, Mali
- Position: Forward

Team information
- Current team: Mandé

Senior career*
| Years | Team | Apps | (Gls) |
| | Mandé | 22 | (47) |
| 2019 | Malaga | 4 | (0) |
| 2020 | Kiryat Gat | 1 | (1) |
| 2021 | ALG Spor | 5 | (6) |
| 2021 | Mandé | | |
| 2021-2022 | Fatih Karagümrük | 26 | (8) |
| 2022-2023 | DUX Logroño | 4 | (1) |
| 2023- | Mandé | | |

International career
| 2010– | Mali | 39 | (20) |
- * Club domestic league appearances and goals as of 12 January 2023

Bassira Touré (born 6 January 1990) is a Malian footballer, who plays as a forward for Fatih Karagümrük and the Mali women's national team.

== Club career ==
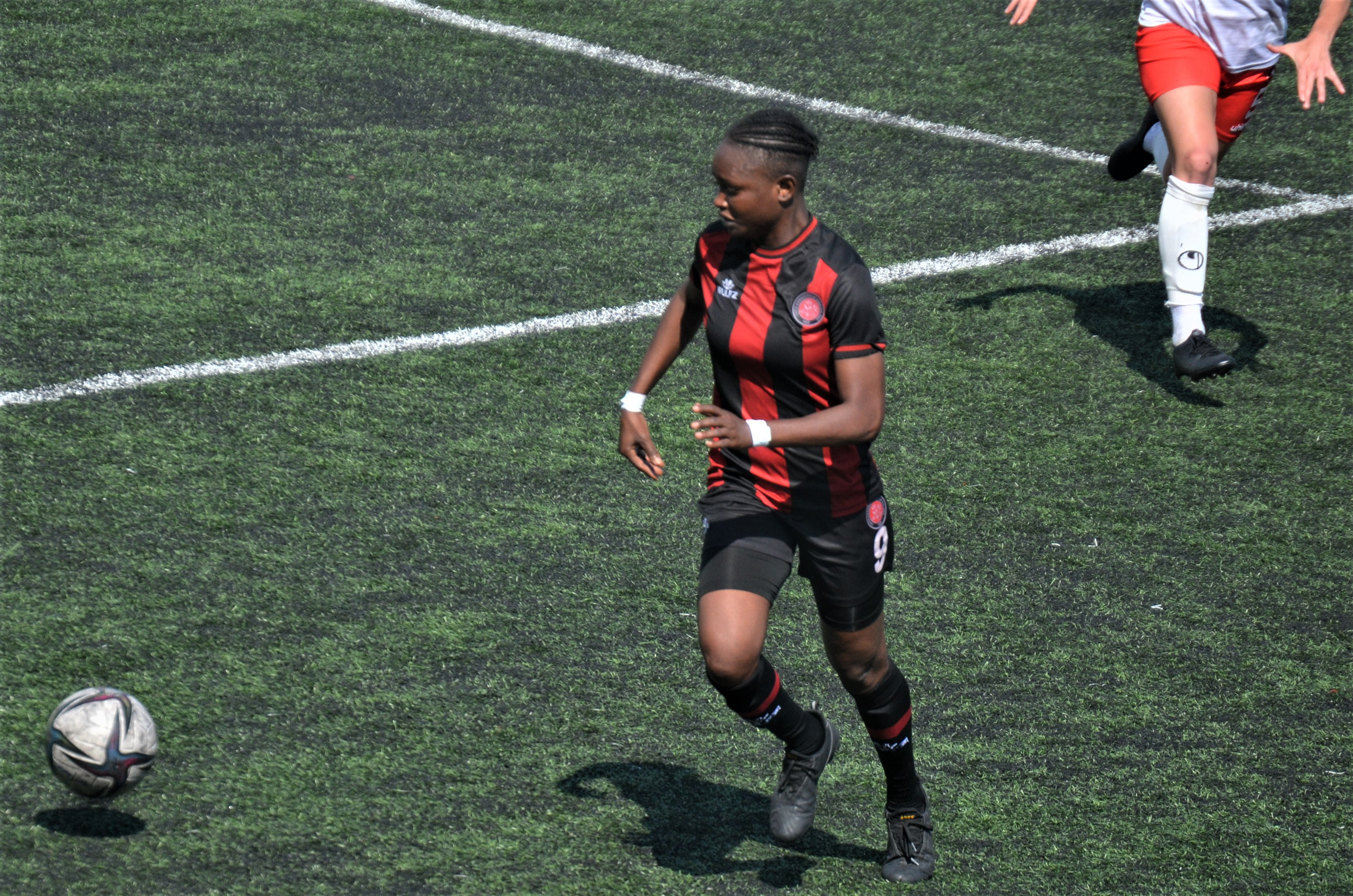
Bassira Touré of Fatih Karagümrük in the 2021-22 Turkish Women's Football Super League play-offs.

Touré returned to Turkey again and joined the newly established Istanbul clubFatih Karagümrük to play 2021-22 Turkcell Women's Super League.

== International career ==
She played for Mali at the 2016 Africa Women Cup of Nations, scoring twice for Mali in the match against Kenya.

She scored for Mali in a 2018 Africa Women Cup of Nations qualification match against Ivory Coast.
