= Juliet Acheampong =

Ghanaian footballer (born 1991)

Personal information
- Full name: Juliet Acheampong
- Date of birth: 11 July 1991 (age 35)
- Place of birth: Ghana
- Position: Midfielder

Senior career*
Years	Team	Apps	(Gls)
2016	Ashtown Ladies	22	(4)
2016	Ånge IF	12	(0)

International career^{‡}
2007–2008	Ghana Under 17		
2008–2011	Ghana Under 20		
2012–	Ghana		
- * Club domestic league appearances and goals ‡ National team caps and goals as of 11 October 2014

Juliet Acheampong (born 11 July 1991) is a Ghanaian women's international footballer who plays as a midfielder for the Ghana women's national football team (Black Queens) and Prisons Ladies.

Acheampong joined Ånge IF for the 2016 season. She made 12 appearances for the team in Division 2.

== International career ==
As a member of the Ghana women's national football team, she competed at the 2014 African Women's Championship.

== Honours ==
=== International ===
Ghana

- All African Games Gold Medal: 2015
- Africa Women Cup of Nations Bronze Medal: 2016

== See also ==
- List of Ghana women's international footballers
