= Yakaré Niakaté =

Malian footballer (born 1997)

Personal information
- Date of birth: 12 January 1997 (age 29)
- Place of birth: Vernon, France
- Positions: Attacking midfielder; defender

Team information
- Current team: Nice
- Number: 27

Youth career
- 2015–2017: Soyaux

Senior career*
Years	Team	Apps	(Gls)
2013–2015	Soyaux	0	(0)
2016–2019	Brest	41	(2)
2019–2020	Saint-Malo	11	(0)
2020–2022	Orléans	21	(0)
2022–2023	Metz	16	(1)
2023–	Nice	21	(1)

International career^{‡}
2018–	Mali	3	(0)
- * Club domestic league appearances and goals as of 20 October 2024. ‡ National team caps and goals as of 11 June 2019

Yakaré Niakaté (born 12 January 1997) is a professional footballer who plays as a defender for Seconde Ligue club Nice. Born in France, she represents Mali at international level.

== Club career ==
Niakaté is a ASJ Soyaux product. She has played for Stade Brestois 29, US Saint-Malo and Orléans in France.

== International career ==
Niakaté competed for Mali at the 2018 Africa Women Cup of Nations, playing in three matches.
