= Coulouba Sogoré =

Malian footballer (born 1997)

Personal information
- Date of birth: 3 June 1997 (age 29)
- Place of birth: Koulikoro, Mali
- Position: Defender

Senior career*
Years	Team	Apps	(Gls)
2019–	Auxerre		

International career^{‡}
2018–	Mali	5	(0)
- * Club domestic league appearances and goals ‡ National team caps and goals as of 11 June 2019

Coulouba Sogoré (born 3 June 1997) is a Malian footballer who plays as a defender for the Mali women's national team.

== Club career ==
Sogoré has played for AS Real in Mali and for Auxerre in France.

== International career ==
Sogoré competed for Mali at the 2018 Africa Women Cup of Nations, playing in five matches.
