= Juliet Appiah =

Ghanaian football referee

- Full name: Juliet Appiah
- Born: 1989 (age 36–37); Ghana
- Other occupation: Police officer

Domestic
Years	League	Role
?–2016	Division One League	Referee
2018–	Ghana Premier League	Referee

International
Years	League	Role
2018–	FIFA listed	Referee

Juliet Appiah (born 1989) is a Ghanaian association football referee in the Ghana Premier League. She is a Ghanaian police officer and a FIFA referee. In 2018, she became the first person in the Ghana Police Service to be awarded a FIFA refereeing license.

== FIFA referee ==
In February 2018 the Ghana Football Association received accreditation from FIFA for 22 Ghanaian referees who had applied for international refereeing licenses. Juliet Appiah became the first Ghanaian police officer of either sex to be awarded a FIFA refereeing badge.

After she had received her badge, a brief ceremony took place at the Ghana Police headquarters. The presentation involved a delegation from the Ghana Football Association who officially announced the achievement of Juliet Appiah to the Inspector General of Police (IGP). The technical director of the Ghana Football Association, Francis Oti Akenteng and Ghana Women's League Board chairperson Linear Addy were present during the ceremony. The IGP, David Asante-Apeatu, advised Juliet Appiah to maintain the highest level of integrity on and off the football field.

== Officiation ==
Juliet Appiah has officiated at several matches in the second tier of the Ghana football league. Some of her match handling skills have received praise from various association executives.

Appiah was appointed by the Referees' Appointment Committee of the GFA to officiate at a match-day 11 game between Dreams FC and Inter Allies in Dawu. She officiated at her first Ghana Premier League match when the match kicked off on Wednesday May 2, 2018. Her performance was generally considered to have been average as many of her decisions during the match were deemed controversial. In the game she wrongly awarded a penalty to the home team after the ball had hit the chin of an Inter Allies player.

== Honours ==
- The most promising referee – 2015 MTN FA Cup Awards.
- First female police officer to referee a Ghana Premier League match.
