= Agueicha Diarra =

Malian footballer (born 1998)

Agueissa Diarra
Personal information
- Date of birth: 30 July 1998 (age 28)
- Place of birth: Bamako, Mali
- Height: 1.67 m (5 ft 6 in)
- Position: Forward

Senior career*
Years	Team	Apps	(Gls)
201?–2020	Super Lionnes d'Hamdallaye		
2020–2022	CM Laâyoune	50	(47)
2022–2023	Wydad AC	23	(16)
2023–2024	SC Casablanca	25	(29)
2024–2026	Paris Saint-Germain	8	(1)

International career^{‡}
2018–	Mali	38	(31)
- * Club domestic league appearances and goals ‡ National team caps and goals as of 11 June 2026

Agueissa Diarra (born 30 July 1998) is a Malian footballer who plays as a forward for the Mali national team. She competed for Mali at the 2018 Africa Women Cup of Nations, playing in three matches.

== Career statistics ==
=== Club ===
Club	Season	Division	League		Cup		Continental		Total	
Club	Season	Division	Apps	Goals	Apps	Goals	Apps	Goals	!Apps	Goals
Laâyoune	2020-21	Morocco Women D1	24	26	2	5			26	31
Laâyoune	2021-22	Morocco Women D1	26	21	2	3			28	24
Laâyoune	Total		50	47	4	8			54	55
Wydad	2022-23	Morocco Women D1	23	16	2	3			25	19
Sporting Club	2023-24	Morocco Women D1	25	29			6	2	31	31
PSG	2024-25	Ligue Féminin	8	1	2	0			10	2
Total career			106	93	8	11	6	2	120	106
