= Refiloe Jane =

South African soccer player (born 1992)

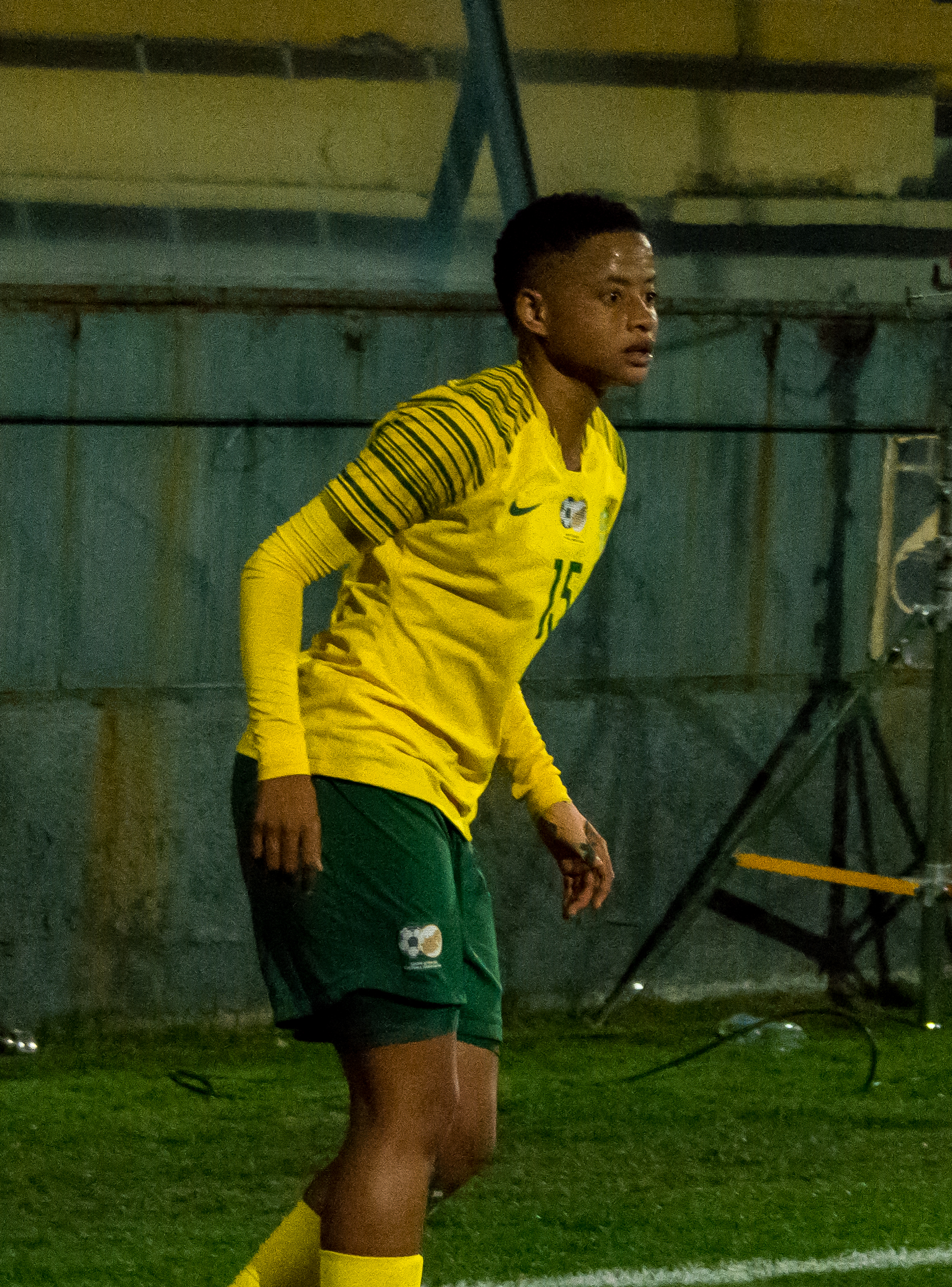
- Jane with South Africa in 2018

Personal information
- Date of birth: 4 August 1992 (age 34)
- Place of birth: Kliptown, Gauteng, South Africa
- Height: 1.68 m (5 ft 6 in)
- Position: Midfielder

Team information
- Current team: TS Galaxy Queens
- Number: 4

Senior career*
Years	Team	Apps	(Gls)
–	Colchester United		
2012	Mamelodi Sundowns		
–2018	TUT Ladies		
2018–2019	Canberra United	10	(2)
2019–2022	AC Milan	45	(3)
2022–2024	Sassuolo	29	(3)
2025–	TS Galaxy Queens	22	(1)

International career^{‡}
2012–	South Africa	150	(18)
Medal record
Representing South Africa
Women's Africa Cup of Nations
Second place	2012 Equatorial Guinea
Second place	2018 Ghana
First place	2022 Morocco
- * Club domestic league appearances and goals as of 9 June 2026 ‡ National team caps and goals as of 9 June 2026

Refiloe Jane (born 4 August 1992) is a South African professional soccer player who plays as a midfielder and captain for the South African women's national team. She plays for SAFA Women's League club TS Galaxy Queens.

== Club career ==
=== Canberra United ===
From 20 August 2018 to 2019, Canberra United announced that it had signed Jane for the 2018–19 W-League Season. She joined the club alongside fellow South African Rhoda Mulaudzi; they are the first players from South Africa to play in the W-League.

=== AC Milan ===
After parting ways with the Australian team Canberra United in April 2019, Refiloe signed for Italian Serie A Women's League outfit AC Milan on a one-year deal for an undisclosed fee.

=== Sassuolo ===
In August 2022, she joined Italian Serie A side Sassuolo. After two seasons at the club, she left in the summer of 2024, seeking a new challenge.

=== TS Galaxy Queens ===
She returned from being sidelined for 10 months due to an injury by signing with SAFA Women's League side TS Galaxy Queens. Jane made her debut on 15 March 2025 and assisted the first goal in a 2-0 win over First Touch.

== International career ==
Jane represented South Africa at the 2012 London Olympics. In September 2014, Jane was named to the roster for the 2014 African Women's Championship in Namibia.

Jane was named in the South African squad for the 2016 Summer Olympics and played every minute of the team's three group games. On 27 February 2019, Jane made her 100th appearance for South Africa against Finland.

She captained the South African women's national team at the Women's Africa Cup of Nations where they won their first continental title and the 2023 FIFA Women's World Cup where they reached the last 16. Jane played the opening two games, a 2-1 defeat to Sweden and 2-2 draw against Argentina, where she exited Dunedin Stadium in New Zealand on a stretcher after a tough collision with Argentine midfielder Florencia Bonsegundo. South Africa went on to beat Italy 3-2 without Jane, but bowed out in the last-16 to the Netherlands on a 2-0 scoreline. In April 2024, she returned to the national team in the 2024 Olympic last round qualifiers against Nigeria where the team failed to qualify for the tournament after a 1–0 aggregate loss.

Jane played her 150th appearance for the national team on 9 June 2026 against Japan, becoming the fourth most-capped player in the team following Nompumelelo Nyandeni (150 caps), Noko Matlou (174 caps), and Janine van Wyk (185 caps).

In July-August 2026, Jane was again captain of the team in the 2026 Women's Africa Cup of Nations (WAFCON). South Africa got knocked out in the quarterfinals, ending their title defense and also failing to secure an automatic spot in the 2027 Women's World Cup. They did, however, reach an inter-confederation play-in game to keep alive their hopes of reaching the World Cup. In that game, against Nigeria on August 13, Jane scored the game-winning goal in the 77^{th} minute and then received a red card (second yellow) in the 90+2^{nd} minute. With this win, South Africa qualified for the preliminary phase of the 2027 FIFA Women's World Cup qualification inter-confederation play-offs.

International goals

Scores and results list South Africa's goal tally first

No.	Date	Venue	Opponent	Score	Result	Competition	Reference
1	10 December 2012	Royal Bafokeng Stadium, Phokeng, South Africa	Botswana	2-0	3-0	Friendly	
2	13 September 2014	Royal Bafokeng Stadium, Phokeng, South Africa	Botswana	4–0	10–0	Friendly	
3	22 October 2014	Sam Nujoma Stadium, Windhoek, Namibia	Nigeria	1–2	1–2	2014 African Women's Championship	
4	25 November 2016	Limbe Stadium, Limbe, Cameroon	Egypt	3–0	5–0	2016 Africa Women Cup of Nations	
5	21 September 2017	Barbourfields Stadium, Bulawayo, Zimbabwe	Zambia	3–3	3–3	2017 COSAFA Women's Championship	
6	22 September 2018	Wolfson Stadium, KwaZakele, South Africa	Cameroon	1–0	2–1	2018 COSAFA Women's Championship	
7	22 September 2018	Wolfson Stadium, KwaZakele, South Africa	Cameroon	2–1	2–1	2018 COSAFA Women's Championship	
8	7 October 2018	Estadio Sausalito, Viña del Mar, Chile	Chile	1–1	1–2	Friendly	
9	21 November 2018	Cape Coast Sports Stadium, Cape Coast, Ghana	Equatorial Guinea	3–1	7–1	2018 Africa Women Cup of Nations	
10	14 July 2025	Honneur Stadium, Oujda, Morocco	Mali	2–0	4–0	2024 Women's Africa Cup of Nations	
11	13 August 2026	Moulay Rachid Stadium, Casablanca, Morocco	Nigeria	2–0	2–1	Inter-confederation play-in, 2026 Women's Africa Cup of Nations	

== Personal life ==
She married Christa Kgamphe on 18 June 2021.

== Honours ==
South Africa

- Women's Africa Cup of Nations: 2022, runner-up: 2012, 2018

Individual

- Women's Africa Cup of Nations Team of the Tournament: 2022
- IFFHS CAF Women's Team of The Year: 2022
- Women's Africa XI: 2023
