= Mali women's national football team =

Women's national association football team representing Mali

Mali
- Nickname: Les Aiglonnes (The Female Eagles)
- Association: Malian Football Federation
- Confederation: CAF (Africa)
- Sub-confederation: WAFU (West Africa)
- Head coach: Birama Konate
- Top scorer: Agueissa Diarra (31)
- Home stadium: Stade Modibo Kéïta
- FIFA code: MLI
First colours	Second colours

FIFA ranking
- Current: 84 ▲1 (16 June 2026)
- Highest: 62 (July 2003)
- Lowest: 101 (September 2015)

First international
- Ivory Coast 3–3 Mali (Abidjan, Ivory Coast; 9 August 2002)

Biggest win
- Mali 12–0 Niger (Abidjan, Ivory Coast; 9 May 2019)

Biggest defeat
- Nigeria 8–0 Mali (Abuja, Nigeria; 9 April 2015)

World Cup
- Appearances: 0

Olympic Games
- Appearances: 0

Women's Africa Cup of Nations
- Appearances: 9 (first in 2002)
- Best result: Fourth place (2018)

The Mali women's national football team represents Mali in women's international football and is overseen by the Malian Football Federation, the governing body for football in Mali. They play their home matches at the Stade Modibo Kéïta, a multi-purpose stadium located in the city of Bamako.

Currently, Mali is ranked 85th in FIFA Women's World Rankings. They have never qualified for a FIFA Women's World Cup, but made a total of nine appearances in the Africa Women Cup of Nations since the 2002 edition.

== Team image ==
=== Home stadium ===
The Mali women's national football team plays their home matches on the Stade Modibo Kéïta.

== Results and fixtures ==
The following is a list of match results in the last 12 months, as well as any future matches that have been scheduled.

Legend

Win Draw Lose Fixture

=== 2025 ===
20 February 2026 WAFCON qualifying	Gabon	0–6	Mali	Franceville, Gabon
14:30 GMT		Report	A. Traoré 3', 7'; A. Diarra 20', 34'; F. Dembele 55'; F. Niakaté 74'	Stadium: Stade de Franceville; Referee: Zakia El Grini (Morocco)

25 February 2026 WAFCON qualifying	Mali	4–1	Gabon	Bamako, Mali
19:00 GMT	A. Diarra 22' (pen.); S. Diarra 36'; Sogoré 43'; Tapily 82'	Report	Assengone 81' (pen.)	Stadium: Stade du 26 Mars

22 May 2025 WAFU Zone A Cup GS	Mauritania	0–5	Mali	Nouakchott, Mauritania
16:00		Report	Koné 5'; S. Diarra 14', 66'; Ag. Diarra 26'; Samaké 28'	Stadium: Cheikha Ould Boïdiya Stadium; Referee: Fatou Ngum (Gambia)

24 May 2025 WAFU Zone A Cup GS	Guinea-Bissau	1–4	Mali	Nouakchott, Mauritania
19:00	Iala 36'	Report	Koné 24', 49', 62'; Ag. Diarra 40'	Stadium: Stade Ksar; Referee: Aida Sy (Senegal)

26 May 2025 WAFU Zone A Cup GS	Mali	1–1	Liberia	Nouakchott, Mauritania
16:00	F. Dembele 21'	Report	Yantay 45+3'	Stadium: Stade Ksar; Referee: Fatou Ngum (Gambia)

29 May 2025 WAFU Zone A Cup SF	Mali	0–1	Sierra Leone	Nouakchott, Mauritania
16:00		Report	S. Kamara 82'	Stadium: Cheikha Ould Boïdiya Stadium; Referee: Félicité Kourouma (Guinea)

31 May 2025 WAFU Zone A Cup	Mali	0–1	Liberia	Nouakchott, Mauritania
17:00		Report	Glao 63'	Stadium: Cheikha Ould Boïdiya Stadium; Referee: Félicité Kourouma (Guinea)

30 June Friendly	Mali	1–1	Zambia	Mohammedia, Morocco
17:00 GMT		Report

7 July 2024 WAFCON GS	Mali	1–0	Tanzania	Berkane, Morocco
19:00 GMT	S. Traoré 45+1'	Report		Stadium: Berkane Stadium; Referee: Aline Guimbang A Etong (Cameroon)

11 July 2024 WAFCON GS	Ghana	1–1	Mali	Berkane, Morocco
16:00 GMT	Kusi 6'	Report	A. Traoré 52'	Stadium: Berkane Stadium; Referee: Ghada Mehat (Algeria)

14 July 2024 WAFCON GS	South Africa	4–0	Mali	Oujda, Morocco
19:00 GMT	Ramalepe 5'; Jane 32'; Magaia 61'; Donnelly 79'	Report		Stadium: Honneur Stadium; Referee: Bouchra Karboubi (Morocco)

18 July 2024 WAFCON QF	Morocco	3–1	Mali	Rabat, Morocco
20:00 GMT	Jraïdi 7', 79' (pen.); Chapelle 89'	Report	A. Traoré 90+7' (pen.)	Stadium: Rabat Olympic Stadium; Referee: Akhona Makalima (South Africa)

24 October 2026 WAFCON qualifying	Cape Verde	0–1	Mali	Praia, Cape Verde
16:00 GMT		Report	C. Dembele 81'	Stadium: Estádio Nacional de Cabo Verde; Referee: Aicha Bit Oumarou (Chad)

28 October 2026 WAFCON qualifying	Mali	2–4	Cape Verde	Bamako, Mali
17:00 GMT	Kone 55', 88'	Report	Melo 14'; Moreira 17'; Vieira 24'; Pereira 72'	Stadium: Stade du 26 Mars; Referee: Kindédji Edoh (Togo)

=== 2026 ===
17 April Friendly	Morocco	1–1	Mali	Rabat, Morocco
17:30 GMT	Jraïdi 61'	Report	A. Traoré 45+4'	Stadium: Moulay El Hassan Stadium; Referee: Dorsaf Ganouati (Tunisia)

27 July 2026 WAFCON GS	Cameroon	2-1	Mali	Casablanca, Morocco
21:00	Ngah Manga 14', 73' (pen.)	Report (FIFA)	A. Traoré 30' (pen.)	Stadium: Larbi Zaouli Stadium; Referee: Antsino Twanyanyukwa (Namibia)

30 July 2026 WAFCON GS	Mali	3-2	Cape Verde	Fez, Morocco
21:00	Koné 29'; F. Niakaté 50'; F. Diarra 79'	Report (FIFA)	Pereira 36'; Kelly 88'	Stadium: Fez Stadium; Referee: Aminata Fullah (Sierra Leone)

6 August 2026 WAFCON GS	Mali	1-1	Ghana	Casablanca
21:00 (UTC+01:00)	Diabaté 50'	Report (FIFA)	Badu 45+3'	Stadium: Moulay Rachid Stadium; Referee: Akhona Makalima (South Africa)

5–8 October 2028 Summer Olympic qualifying	Benin	v	Mali	TBD

11–13 October 2028 Summer Olympic qualifying	Mali	v	Benin	Bamako, Mali

== Coaching staff ==
=== Current coaching staff ===
Position	Name	Ref.
Head coach	(Mali) Birama Konate	

== Former managers ==
- (Mali) Bintou Camara

== Players ==
=== Current squad ===
- The following players were called up for the 2026 WAFCON matches from 26 July through 16 August 2026. .

No.	Pos.	Player	Date of birth (age)	Club
1	GK	Fatoumata Karentao (Captain)	8 November 1990 (aged 35)	(Malian Football Federation) USFAS
2	DF	Coulouba Sogoré	3 June 1997 (aged 29)	(French Football Federation) Auxerre
3	DF	Mariam Marega	16 September 2001 (aged 24)	(French Football Federation) Roubaix Wervicq
4	DF	Fatou Dembele	30 November 2000 (aged 25)	(Royal Spanish Football Federation) Tenerife
5	MF	Marine Coudon	1 March 1992 (aged 34)	(French Football Federation) Albi
6	MF	Coumba Dembele	25 October 2001 (aged 24)	(French Football Federation) Roubaix Wervicq
7	MF	Fatoumata Diarra	15 April 1986 (aged 40)	(Tanzania Football Federation) Tausi
8	MF	Yakaré Niakaté	12 January 1997 (aged 29)	(French Football Federation) Nice
9	FW	Oumou Koné	20 December 1999 (aged 26)	(Malian Football Federation) USFAS
10	FW	Agueissa Diarra	30 July 1998 (aged 27)	(French Football Federation) Paris Saint-Germain
11	MF	Salimata Diarra	24 October 1994 (aged 31)	(Royal Moroccan Football Federation) FUS Rabat
12	MF	Hawa N'Diaye	15 September 2003 (aged 22)	(Royal Moroccan Football Federation) USSB Berkane
13	DF	Kani Konté	13 April 1989 (aged 37)	(French Football Federation) Paris SO Cœur
14	FW	Aissata Traoré	9 September 1997 (aged 28)	(United States Soccer Federation) Boston Legacy
15	FW	Kadidiatou Diabaté	5 February 2007 (aged 19)	(Malian Football Federation) AS Mandé
16	GK	Goundo Samaké	2 May 1992 (aged 34)	(Malian Football Federation) FE La Source
17	FW	Jasmin Diop	29 October 2005 (aged 20)	(Canadian Soccer Association) CS Longueuil
18	MF	Kadiatou Diarra	13 November 2008 (aged 17)	(French Football Federation) Paris FC
19	FW	Fatoumata Niakaté	22 December 2006 (aged 19)	(French Football Federation) Saint-Denis
20	MF	Saratou Traoré	27 September 2002 (aged 23)	(Chinese Football Association) Beijing
21	DF	Oumou Sidibé	4 January 2008 (aged 18)	(French Football Federation) Paris FC
22	GK	Aïssatou Liberge	4 December 2005 (aged 20)	(French Football Federation) La Roche-sur-Yon
23	DF	Teninsoun Sissoko	2 September 1992 (aged 33)	(French Football Federation) Paris FC
24	DF	Aliya Diagne	8 May 2001 (aged 25)	(United States Soccer Federation) UCF Knights
25	DF	Orokia Sissoko	25 October 2000 (aged 25)	(French Football Federation) Roubaix Wervicq
26	FW	Aminata Dicko	27 March 2004 (aged 22)	(French Football Federation) Rueil-Malmaison

=== Recent call-ups ===
- The following players have been called up to the Mali squad in the past 12 months.

Pos.	Player	Date of birth (age)	Caps	Goals	Club	Latest call-up
GK	Mariam Camara	19 February 2002 (age 24)	-	-	(Mali) USFAS Bamako	v. Cape Verde,28 October 2025
DF	Maimouna Traoré	31 December 1998 (age 27)	-	-	(Mali) USFAS Bamako	v. Cape Verde,28 October 2025
DF	Bintou Guindo	22 February 1997 (age 29)	-	-	(Mali) USFAS Bamako	v. Cape Verde,28 October 2025
MF	Korotoumou Keita	×10^{2000}	-	-	(Mali) AS Mandé	v. Cape Verde,28 October 2025
FW	Djamako Traoré		-	-	(Mali) USFAS Bamako	v. Cape Verde,28 October 2025
FW	Nountene Traoré		-	-	(Mali) AS Mandé	v. Cape Verde,28 October 2025

== Records ==
- Active players in **bold**, statistics correct **as of 2020**.

=== Most capped players ===
#	Player	Year(s)	Caps

=== Top goalscorers ===
#	Player	Year(s)	Goals	Caps

== Competitive record ==
=== FIFA Women's World Cup ===
FIFA Women's World Cup record									Qualification record					
Year	Result	Pos	Pld	W	D	L	GF	GA	Pld	W	D	L	GF	GA
(China) 1991	Did not enter								–	–	–	–	–	–
(Sweden) 1995	Did not enter								–	–	–	–	–	–
(United States) 1999	Did not enter								–	–	–	–	–	–
(United States) 2003	Did not qualify								7	0	5	2	7	13
(China) 2007	Did not qualify								7	5	0	2	13	7
(Germany) 2011	Did not qualify								5	2	0	3	6	13
(Canada) 2015	Did not qualify								2	0	0	2	0	5
(France) 2019	Did not qualify								5	2	0	3	6	5
(Australia) (New Zealand) 2023	Did not qualify								4	1	1	2	4	4
(Brazil) 2027	Did not qualify								Did not qualify					
Total	–	–	–	–	–	–	–	–	25	8	6	11	30	42

=== Olympic Games ===
Summer Olympics record									Qualification record					
Year	Result	Pos	Pld	W	D	L	GF	GA	Pld	W	D	L	GF	GA
(United States) 1996	Ineligible								–	–	–	–	–	–
(Australia) 2000	Ineligible								–	–	–	–	–	–
(Greece) 2004	Did not enter								–	–	–	–	–	–
(China) 2008	Did not enter								–	–	–	–	–	–
(United Kingdom) 2012	Did not qualify								2	0	0	2	0	6
(Brazil) 2016	Withdrew								–	–	–	–	–	–
(Japan) 2020	Did not qualify								4	2	0	2	5	6
(France) 2024	Withdrew								2	2	0	0	3	0
Total	–	–	–	–	–	–	–	–	8	4	0	4	5	6

=== Africa Women Cup of Nations ===
Africa Women Cup of Nations record									Qualification record					
Year	Result	Pos	Pld	W	D	L	GF	GA	Pld	W	D	L	GF	GA
1991	Did not enter								Invitational Tournament					
1995	Did not enter								Invitational Tournament					
(Nigeria) 1998	Did not enter								–	–	–	–	–	–
(South Africa) 2000	Did not enter								–	–	–	–	–	–
(Nigeria) 2002	Group stage	7th	3	0	1	2	3	9	4	0	4	0	4	4
(South Africa) 2004	Group stage	7th	3	0	1	2	2	8	2	0	1	1	2	3
(Nigeria) 2006	Group stage	5th	3	1	0	2	3	5	4	4	0	0	10	2
(Equatorial Guinea) 2008	Group stage	8th	3	0	0	3	2	5	2	2	0	0	11	0
(South Africa) 2010	Group stage	6th	3	1	0	2	3	11	2	1	0	1	3	2
(Equatorial Guinea) 2012	Did not qualify								2	0	0	2	0	8
(Namibia) 2014	Did not qualify								2	0	0	2	0	5
(Cameroon) 2016	Group stage	5th	3	1	0	2	4	10	4	1	2	1	4	4
(Ghana) 2018	**Fourth Place**	**4th**	**5**	**2**	**0**	**3**	**8**	**11**	2	0	2	0	2	2
2020	Cancelled due to covid								–	–	–	–	–	–
(Morocco) 2022	Did Not qualify								–	–	–	–	–	–
(Morocco) 2024	Quarter-finals	7th	4	1	1	2	3	8	4	4	0	0	20	3
(Morocco) 2026	Group stage	10th	3	1	1	1	5	5	4	3	0	1	13	5
Total:9/14	Fourth Place	4th	30	7	4	19	33	72	32	15	9	8	69	38

=== African Games ===
African Games record									Qualification record					
Year	Result	Pos	Pld	W	D	L	GF	GA	Pld	W	D	L	GF	GA
(Nigeria) 2003	Fourth place	4th	5	1	1	3	4	6	No Qualifying Process					
(Algeria) 2007	Withdrew								–	–	–	–	–	–
(Mozambique) 2011	Withdrew								–	–	–	–	–	–
(Republic of the Congo) 2015	Did not qualify								2	0	1	1	1	9
(Morocco) 2019	See U-20 team								See U-20 team					
(Ghana) 2023	See U-20 team								See U-20 team					
Total	Fourth place	1/4	5	1	1	3	4	6	2	0	1	1	1	9

- 2019 and 2023 editions of the football tournament was played by the U-20 team.

See Mali women's national under-20 football team

=== Tournoi de Cinq Nations ===
Tournoi de Cinq Nations record
Year	Result	Pos	Pld	W	D	L	GF	GA
(Burkina Faso) 2007	**Champions**	1st	3	2	1	0	7	4
Total	1/1	1st	3	2	1	0	7	4

=== WAFU Women's Cup record ===
WAFU Zone A Women's Cup
Year	Result	Position	Pld	W	D	L	GF	GA
(Sierra Leone) 2020	Runners-up	2nd	5	4	0	1	12	3
(Cape Verde) 2023	Did not enter							
Total	Runners-up	1/2	5	4	0	1	12	3

== See also ==
- Sport in Mali
  - Football in Mali
    - Women's football in Mali
