= Traoré =

Traoré or Traore is a surname of Manding origin (Bambara: Taara-oray), as written in French orthography, which is common in Mali, Senegal, Burkina Faso, Ivory Coast and Guinea. In anglophone West Africa the name is often spelled Trawally.

== Notable people with the surname include ==
=== A ===
- Abd Traore, Guinean entrepreneur
- Abdou Traoré (disambiguation), multiple people
- Abdoulaye Traoré (disambiguation), multiple people
- Abdoullaye Traoré (born 2000), Ivorian-Italian footballer
- Abibatou Traoré (born 1973), Senegalese writer
- Abou Traoré, Guinean politician
- Aboubacar Traoré (born 1992), Burkinabé footballer
- Adama Traoré (disambiguation), multiple people
- Aissata Traoré (born 1997), Malian footballer
- Alain Traoré (born 1988), Burkinabé footballer
- Ali Traoré (born 1985), French basketball player
- Aliou Traoré (born 2001), French footballer
- Alou Traoré (born 1974), Malian footballer
- Alyssa Traoré (born 1998), Dutch fashion model
- Amadou Traoré (born 2002), French footballer
- Amara Traoré (born 1965), Senegalese footballer
- Amina Moussou Ouédraogo Traoré (born 1948), Burkinabé lawyer and politician
- Aminata Traoré (disambiguation), multiple people
- Apolline Traoré (born 1976), Burkinabé filmmaker
- Arissou Traore (born 1984), Togolese footballer
- Armand Traoré (born 1989), French footballer
- Armel Traoré (born 2003), French basketball player
- Assa Traoré (born 1985), French activist
- Astou Traoré (born 1981), Senegalese basketball player
- Awa Traoré, Malian filmmaker
- Aya Traoré (born 1983), Senegalese basketball player
- Ayouba Traoré (born 1982), Malian judoka

=== B ===
- Baba Traoré (born 1992), French footballer
- Babemba Traoré (1855–1898), Malian royal
- Baboye Traoré (born 1990), French footballer
- Badara Traore (born 1997), American football player
- Bakaye Traoré (born 1985), Malian footballer
- Bano Traoré (born 1985), Malian-French athlete
- Ben Traoré (born 1986), Malian footballer
- Bénie Traoré (born 2002), Ivorian footballer
- Bertrand Traoré (born 1995), Burkinabé footballer
- Bio Aï Traoré (born 1985), Beninese footballer
- Boubacar Traoré (disambiguation), multiple people
- Brahim Traoré (born 2004), French footballer
- Brahima Traoré (born 1974), Burkinabé footballer
- Brama Traoré (born 1962), Burkinabé footballer
- Bréhima Traoré (born 1973), Malian footballer

=== C ===
- Chaka Traore (born 2004), Ivorian footballer
- Charles Traoré (born 1992), Malian footballer
- Cheibane Traoré (born 1990), Malian footballer
- Cheick Traoré (born 1995), Malian footballer
- Cheick Bougadary Traoré, Malian political candidate
- Cheickna Traore (born 2000), Ivorian sprinter
- Cherif Traoré (born 1994), Guinean-Italian footballer
- Christian Traoré (born 1982), Danish footballer

=== D ===
- Dambou Traoré (born 1977), French footballer
- Dame Traoré (born 1986), French footballer
- Daouda Traoré (born 2006), French footballer
- Demba Traoré (born 1982), Swedish footballer
- Demba Traoré (politician) (born 1972), Malian lawyer and politician
- Diarra Traoré (1935–1985), Guinean politician
- Diedie Traore (born 1999), French footballer
- Dioncounda Traoré (born 1942), Malian politician
- Diongolo Traore (1914–1971), Burkinabé politician
- Djiguible Traoré (born 1960), Malian boxer
- Djimi Traoré (born 1980), Malian footballer
- Dramane Traoré (born 1982), Malian footballer
- Drissa Traoré (born 1992), Ivorian footballer

=== E ===
- Efua Traoré, Nigerian-German writer
- Elhadj Oumar Traoré, Guinean politician
- Eric Traoré (born 1996), Burkinabé footballer

=== F ===
- Falaba Issa Traoré (1930–2003), Malian writer
- Fodie Traore (born 1985), French footballer

=== G ===
- Gaoussou Traoré (born 1999), French footballer

=== H ===
- Hadamou Traoré (born 1993), French footballer
- Hamari Traoré (born 1992), Malian footballer
- Hamed Traorè (born 2000), Ivorian footballer
- Hamidou Traoré (born 1996), Malian footballer
- Henri Traoré (born 1983), Burkinabé footballer
- Honoré Traoré (1957–2026), Burkinabé soldier

=== I ===
- Ibrahim Traoré (born 1988), Burkinabé military officer and politician
- Ibrahim Traoré (footballer) (born 1988), Ivorian footballer
- Ibrahima Traoré (born 1988), Guinean footballer
- Idrissa Traoré (disambiguation), multiple people
- Ismaël Traoré (born 1986), French/Ivorian footballer
- Issa de Brahima Traoré (born 1962), Burkinabé filmmaker
- Issa Falaba Traoré (1930–2003), Malian filmmaker
- Issa Traoré (born 1979), Malian footballer
- Iya Traoré (born 1986), Guinean footballer

=== J ===
- Jean-Victor Traoré (born 1985), Burkinabé basketball player

=== K ===
- Kady Traoré (born 1979), Burkinabé actress
- Kalifa Traoré (born 1991), Malian footballer
- Kalilou Traoré (born 1987), Malian footballer
- Kandia Traoré (born 1980), Ivorian footballer
- Karamoko Jean-Marie Traoré (born 1972), Burkinabé politician
- Kassim Traoré (born 1966), Malian boxer
- Koh Traoré (born 1989), Burkinabé-Ivorian footballer

=== L ===
- Lacina Traoré (born 1990), Ivorian footballer
- Lamine Traoré (disambiguation), multiple people
- Lassana Traoré (born 1945), Malian politician and diplomat
- Lassina Traoré (born 2001), Burkinabé footballer
- Lobi Traoré (1961–2010), Malian musician

=== M ===
- Madimoussa Traoré (born 1986), French footballer
- Mahama Johnson Traoré (1942–2010), Senegalese film director
- Mahamadou Traoré (born 1994), Malian footballer
- Mahamane Traoré (born 1988), Malian footballer
- Mai Traore (born 1999), Guinean footballer
- Maimouna Traoré (born 1998), Malian footballer
- Makan Traoré (boxer) (born 2000), French boxer
- Makan Traore (footballer, born 1992) (born 1992), French footballer
- Mamadou Traoré (disambiguation), multiple people
- Mamary Traoré (born 1980), Malian footballer
- Manssita Traoré (born 2003), French footballer
- Mariam Traore (born 1980), Ivorian handball player
- Mathieu Traoré (born 1972), Burkinabé footballer
- Mélégué Maurice Traoré (born 1951), Burkinabé politician
- Méry Traoré (born 2003), Malian footballer
- Mody Traoré (born 1980), French footballer
- Moha Traoré (born 1994), Malian-Spanish footballer
- Mohamed Traoré (disambiguation), multiple people
- Mossi Traoré (born 1985), French fashion designer
- Mouhamadou Traoré (born 1982/1986), Senegalese footballer
- Mouna Traoré, Canadian actress
- Moussa Traoré (disambiguation), multiple people
- Mustapha Traoré (born 1982), French footballer

=== N ===
- Nassira Traoré (born 1988), Malian volleyball player
- Nolan Traoré (born 2006), French basketball player

=== O ===
- Oula Abass Traoré (born 1995), Burkinabé footballer
- Omar Haktab Traoré (born 1998), German footballer
- Oumar Traoré (disambiguation), multiple people
- Oumou Traoré (born 1969), Malian athlete
- Ousmane Traoré (born 1977), Burkinabé footballer
- Ousmane Traoré (footballer, born 1985) (born 1985), Senegalese footballer

=== P ===
- Pon-Karidjatou Traoré (born 1986), Burkinabé athlete

=== R ===
- Rokia Traoré (born 1974), Malian singer–songwriter

=== S ===
- Sa Brahima Traore (born 1982), Burkinabé footballer
- Safradine Traoré (born 1986), Beninese footballer
- Salif Traoré (born 1972), Malian politician
- Salimata Traoré (born 1994), Malian politician
- Saloum Traoré, Nigerien politician
- Sambou Traoré (born 1979), Malian basketball player
- Sammy Traoré (born 1976), Malian footballer
- Saratou Traoré (born 2002), Malian footballer
- Sékou Traoré born 1962, Burkinabé filmmaker
- Seydou Traoré (footballer) (born 1970), Burkinabé footballer
- Seydou Traore (American football) (born 2002), English American football player
- Seydou Traoré (politician) (1936–1992), Burkinabé politician
- Souleymane Traore (1987–2009), Guinean footballer
- Soumaila Traoré (born 1973), Malian footballer
- Steve Traoré (born 1998), French-Beninese footballer

=== T ===
- Thérèse Traoré, Burkinabé judge
- Tiécoura Traoré, Malian actor
- Tieba Traoré (1845–1893), Malian royal
- Tiramakhan Traore, Malian general
- Togba Traoré, Guinean politician

=== Y ===
- Yohan Traore (born 2003), French basketball player
- Youssouf Traoré (born 1991), Ivorian footballer
