= Salimata =

Salimata is a feminine West African given name, a form of Salima, the feminine form of Arabic Salim, which means "safe" or intact". Notable people with the given name include:

- Salimata Diarra (born 1994), Malian footballer
- Salimata Fofana (born 1997), Ivorian judoka
- Salimata Koné (born 1990), Malian footballer
- Salimata Lam (fl. 2017–present), Mauritanian human rights activist
- Salimata Sawadogo (born 1958), Burkinabé diplomat and magistrate
- Salimata Simporé (born 1987), Burkinabé footballer
- Salimata Traoré (born 1994), Malian politician

== See also ==
- Salimata et Taséré FC, the official name of Salitas FC, a Burkinabé association football club
- Salima (disambiguation)
