= 2019–20 Hellas Verona FC season =

Hellas Verona
2019–20 season
- President: Maurizio Setti
- Manager: Ivan Jurić
- Stadium: Stadio Marc'Antonio Bentegodi
- Serie A: 9th
- Coppa Italia: Third round
- Top goalscorer: League: Samuel Di Carmine (8); All: Samuel Di Carmine (8)
Home colours	Away colours	Third colours

The 2019–20 season was Hellas Verona Football Club's 29th season in Serie A and their first back in the top-flight after being relegated to Serie B at the end of the 2017–18 Serie A season. The club finished 5th in the 2018–19 Serie B season and were promoted via winning the play-off.

== Players ==
=== Squad information ===
Last updated on 8 February 2020
Appearances include league matches only

No.	Name	Nat	Position(s)	Date of birth (age)	Signed from	Signed in	Contract ends	Apps.	Goals	Notes
Goalkeepers
1	Marco Silvestri	(Italy)	GK	2 March 1991 (age 34)	(England) Leeds United	2017	2021	65	0	
22	Alessandro Berardi	(Italy)	GK	16 January 1991 (age 35)	(Italy) Bari	2018	2021	0	0	
96	Boris Radunović	(Serbia)	GK	26 May 1996 (age 29)	(Italy) Atalanta	2019	2020	0	0	Loan
Defenders
5	Davide Faraoni	(Italy)	RB / RM / LB	25 October 1991 (age 34)	(Italy) Crotone	2019	2022	40	6	
13	Amir Rrahmani	(Kosovo)	CB / RB / LB	24 February 1994 (age 31)	(Croatia) Dinamo Zagreb	2019	2022	23	0	
15	Salvatore Bocchetti	(Italy)	CB / LB / DM	30 November 1986 (age 39)	(Russia) Spartak Moscow	2019	2021	5	0	
21	Koray Günter	(Germany)	CB / DM / RB	16 August 1994 (age 31)	(Italy) Genoa	2019	2020	20	0	Loan
23	Federico Dimarco	(Italy)	LB / LM	10 November 1997 (age 28)	(Italy) Internazionale	2020	2020	1	0	Loan
24	Marash Kumbulla	(Albania)	CB / DM	8 February 2000 (age 25)	(Italy) Youth Sector	2018	2022	18	1	
27	Paweł Dawidowicz	(Poland)	CB / DM	20 May 1995 (age 30)	(Portugal) Benfica B	2019	2022	41	2	
33	Alan Empereur	(Brazil)	CB / LB	10 March 1994 (age 31)	(Italy) Foggia	2018	2021	21	0	
98	Claud Adjapong	(Italy)	RB	6 May 1998 (age 27)	(Italy) Sassuolo	2019	2020	1	0	Loan
Midfielders
4	Miguel Veloso	(Portugal)	DM / CM	11 May 1986 (age 39)	(Italy) Genoa	2019	2020	20	2	
7	Emmanuel Agyemang-Badu	(Ghana)	CM / DM	2 December 1990 (age 35)	(Italy) Udinese	2019	2020	3	0	Loan
8	Valentin Eysseric	(France)	AM / LW / RW	25 March 1992 (age 33)	(Italy) Fiorentina	2020	2020	1	0	Loan
14	Valerio Verre	(Italy)	CM / DM / AM	11 January 1994 (age 32)	(Italy) Sampdoria	2019	2020	21	3	Loan
18	Lucas Felippe	(Brazil)	CM / DM / AM	3 May 2000 (age 25)	(Italy) Youth Sector	2019	2022	0	0	
20	Mattia Zaccagni	(Italy)	CM / DM	16 June 1995 (age 30)	(Italy) Bellaria Igea	2014	2022	64	3	
25	Andrea Danzi	(Italy)	DM / LM / CM	25 February 1999 (age 26)	(Italy) Youth Sector	2018	2022	1	0	
32	Matteo Pessina	(Italy)	CM / AM / DM	21 April 1997 (age 28)	(Italy) Atalanta	2019	2020	22	3	Loan
34	Sofyan Amrabat	(Morocco)	CM / RM / CB	21 August 1996 (age 29)	(Belgium) Club Brugge	2019	2020	21	0	Loan
88	Darko Lazović	(Serbia)	RM / RW / LW	15 September 1990 (age 35)	(Italy) Genoa	2019	2022	23	1	
Forwards
9	Mariusz Stępiński	(Poland)	CF / SS	12 May 1995 (age 30)	(Italy) Chievo	2019	2020	12	2	Loan
10	Samuel Di Carmine	(Italy)	CF	29 September 1988 (age 37)	(Italy) Perugia	2019	2021	11	3	
11	Giampaolo Pazzini	(Italy)	CF	2 August 1984 (age 41)	(Italy) Milan	2015	2021	122	49	
16	Fabio Borini	(Italy)	LW / CF / RW	29 March 1991 (age 34)	(Italy) Milan	2020	2020	5	2	Loan
29	Eddie Salcedo	(Italy)	CF / LW	1 October 2001 (age 24)	(Italy) Genoa	2019	2020	9	1	Loan
Players transferred during the season
3	Luigi Vitale	(Italy)	LB / LM / LW	5 October 1987 (age 38)	(Italy) Salernitana	2019	2021	12	0	
6	Luca Marrone	(Italy)	CB / DM	28 March 1990 (age 35)	(Italy) Juventus	2018	2021	24	0	
8	Liam Henderson	(Scotland)	CM / RM / AM	25 April 1996 (age 29)	(Italy) Bari	2018	2022	32	3	
12	Daniel Bessa	(Italy)	CM / LM / AM	14 January 1993 (age 33)	(Italy) Internazionale	2016	2021	58	9	
16	Abdoullaye Traoré	(Ivory Coast)	LW / CF / SS	30 April 2000 (age 25)	(Italy) Youth Sector	2019	2021	0	0	
17	Alessandro Crescenzi	(Italy)	LB / RB / LM	25 September 1991 (age 34)	(Italy) Pescara	2018	2021	12	0	
19	Ľubomír Tupta	(Slovakia)	CF / LW / SS	30 April 2000 (age 25)	(Italy) Youth Sector	2018	2021	19	2	
23	Antonio Di Gaudio	(Italy)	LW / LM / SS	16 August 1989 (age 36)	(Italy) Parma	2019	2021	0	0	
66	Gennaro Tutino	(Italy)	LW / CF / RW	20 August 1996 (age 29)	(Italy) Napoli	2019	2020	6	0	Loan
—	Lee Seung-woo	(South Korea)	LW / SS	6 January 1998 (age 28)	(Spain) Barcelona B	2017	2021	37	2	

== Transfers ==
=== In ===
Date	Pos.	Player	Age	Moving from	Fee	Notes	Source
27 June 2019	DF	(Kosovo) Amir Rrahmani	25	(Croatia) Dinamo Zagreb	€2,1 M		
20 July 2019	MF	(Portugal) Miguel Veloso	33	(Italy) Genoa	Free	Signed as a free agent	
25 July 2019	DF	(Italy) Salvatore Bocchetti	33	(Russia) Spartak Moscow	Free	Signed as a free agent	
6 August 2019	MF	(Serbia) Darko Lazović	29	(Italy) Genoa	Free	Signed as a free agent	
Winter
14 January 2020	MF	(Italy) Fabio Borini	28	(Italy) Milan	Free	Signed as a free agent	

==== Loans in ====
Date	Pos.	Player	Age	Moving from	Fee	Notes	Source
13 July 2019	MF	(Ghana) Emmanuel Agyemang-Badu	29	(Italy) Udinese	€0,4 M	Obligation to buy	
15 July 2019	GK	(Serbia) Boris Radunović	23	(Italy) Atalanta	N/A		
19 July 2019	DF	(Germany) Koray Günter	24	(Italy) Genoa	N/A	Option to buy	
10 August 2019	MF	(Italy) Valerio Verre	25	(Italy) Sampdoria	N/A	Option to buy	
21 August 2019	DF	(Italy) Claud Adjapong	21	(Italy) Sassuolo	N/A		
22 August 2019	MF	(Morocco) Sofyan Amrabat	23	(Belgium) Club Brugge	N/A	Option to buy for €3,5 M	
27 August 2019	MF	(Italy) Matteo Pessina	22	(Italy) Atalanta	N/A	Option to buy	

=== Out ===
Date	Pos.	Player	Age	Moving to	Fee	Notes	Source
18 July 2019	GK	(Brazil) Nícolas	31	(Italy) Udinese	€1,2 M		
30 August 2019	FW	(South Korea) Lee Seung-Woo	21	(Belgium) Sint-Truiden	N/A		

==== Loans out ====
Date	Pos.	Player	Age	Moving to	Fee	Notes	Source
8 August 2019	FW	(Slovenia) Jure Balkovec	24	(Italy) Empoli	N/A	Option to buy	

== Pre-season and friendlies ==
25 July 2019 Friendly	Hoffenheim (Germany)	0–0	(Italy) Hellas Verona	Bad Wimsbach, Austria
17:00 CEST (UTC+2)		Report		Stadium: Hofmaninger Stadion; Referee: Stefan Stangl (Austria)

29 July 2019 Friendly	Hellas Verona (Italy)	1–1	(Turkey) Trabzonspor	Bad Zell, Austria
18:00 CEST (UTC+2)	Veloso 28'; Empereur (yellow card) 45+1'; Pazzini (yellow card) 79'	Report	Baykuş 80'	Stadium: Hedwigs Park Sportplatz; Referee: Achim Untergasser (Austria)

4 August 2019 Friendly	SPAL (Italy)	0–0	(Italy) Hellas Verona	Trento, Italy
19:00 CEST (UTC+2)		Report		Stadium: Stadio Briamasco; Referee: Riccardo Ros (Italy)

6 September 2019 Friendly	Hellas Verona (Italy)	1–2	(Slovenia) Olimpija Ljubljana	Verona, Italy
17:00 CEST (UTC+2)	Verre 4'	Report	Savić 17'; Boakye 36'	Stadium: Stadio Marc'Antonio Bentegodi; Referee: Daniele Chiffi (Italy)

11 October 2019 Friendly	Hellas Verona (Italy)	4–0	(Slovenia) Bravo	Verona, Italy
16:00 CEST (UTC+2)	Tutino 13', 21'; Verre 27'; Stępiński 77'	Report		Stadium: Stadio Marc'Antonio Bentegodi; Referee: Daniele Chiffi (Italy)

16 November 2019 Friendly	Hellas Verona (Italy)	5–1	(Slovenia) Tabor Sežana	Verona, Italy
14:30 CET (UTC+1)	Di Carmine 3', 81'; Pessina 25'; Zaccagni 65'; Dawidowicz 71'	Report	Milošev 26'	Stadium: Campo Sportivo Villafranca; Referee: Daniel Amabile (Italy)

== Competitions ==
=== Serie A ===
==== League table ====
Pos	Team	Pld	W	D	L	GF	GA	GD	Pts	Qualification or relegation
7	Napoli	38	18	8	12	61	50	+11	62	Qualification for the Europa League group stage (Note: Napoli qualified for the Europa League group stage by winning the 2019–20 Coppa Italia.)
8	Sassuolo	38	14	9	15	69	63	+6	51	
9	Hellas Verona	38	12	13	13	47	51	−4	49 (Note: Positions determined by head-to-head points: Hellas Verona: 10 pts; Fiorentina: 5 pts; Parma: 1 pt.)	
10	Fiorentina	38	12	13	13	51	48	+3	49	
11	Parma	38	14	7	17	56	57	−1	49	

Source: Serie A, Soccerway
Rules for classification: 1) Points; 2) Head-to-head points; 3) Head-to-head goal difference; 4) Goal difference; 5) Goals scored; 6) Draw. (Note: Head-to-head record is used only after all the matches between the teams in question have been played)

==== Results summary ====
Overall								Home						Away					
Pld	W	D	L	GF	GA	GD	Pts	W	D	L	GF	GA	GD	W	D	L	GF	GA	GD
38	12	13	13	47	51	−4	49	9	5	5	29	25	+4	3	8	8	18	26	−8

Last updated: 2 August 2020.
Source: Competitive matches

==== Results by round ====
Round	1	2	3	4	5	6	7	8	9	10	11	12	13	14	15	16	17	18	19	20	21	22	23	24	25	26	27	28	29	30	31	32	33	34	35	36	37	38
Ground	H	A	H	A	H	A	H	A	H	A	H	A	H	H	A	H	A	A	H	A	H	A	H	A	H	A	H	A	H	A	H	A	A	H	A	H	H	A
Result	D	W	L	L	D	D	W	L	L	W	W	L	W	L	L	D	D	W	W	D	W	D	W	D	W	L	L	D	W	L	D	D	L	D	D	L	W	L
Position	12	7	12	13	16	14	10	14	16	12	9	10	9	9	11	12	12	11	8	10	9	9	6	6	8	8	9	9	8	8	9	9	9	9	9	9	9	9

Updated to match(es) played on 2 August 2020. Source: Competitive matches
A = Away; H = Home; W = Win; D = Draw; L = Loss

==== Matches ====
25 August 2019 1	Hellas Verona	1–1	Bologna	Verona
20:45 CEST (UTC+02:00)	Dawidowicz (red card) 13'; Henderson (yellow card) 18'; Veloso 37'	Report	Sansone 15' (pen.); Denswil (yellow card) 65'; Destro (yellow card) 80'; Dijks (yellow card) 88'	Stadium: Stadio Marc'Antonio Bentegodi; Attendance: 16,324; Referee: Antonio Giua

1 September 2019 2	Lecce	0–1	Hellas Verona	Lecce
20:45 CEST (UTC+02:00)	Rossettini (yellow card) 22'; Majer (yellow card) 85'	Report	Kumbulla (yellow card) 3'; Günter (yellow card) 65'; Verre (yellow card) 67'; Pessina 81'	Stadium: Stadio Via del Mare; Attendance: 24,418; Referee: Juan Luca Sacchi

15 September 2019 3	Hellas Verona	0–1	Milan	Verona
20:45 CEST (UTC+02:00)	Stępiński (red card) 21'; Veloso (yellow card) 40'; Günter (yellow card) 65'; Amrabat (yellow card) 74'; Silvestri (yellow card) 85'	Report	Piątek (yellow card) 24', (goal) 68' (pen.); Paquetá (yellow card) 35'; Rebić (yellow card) 86'; Calabria (red card) 90+3'	Stadium: Stadio Marc'Antonio Bentegodi; Attendance: 24,363; Referee: Gianluca Manganiello

21 September 2019 4	Juventus	2–1	Hellas Verona	Turin
18:00 CEST (UTC+02:00)	Ramsey 31'; Ronaldo 49' (pen.)	Report	Kumbulla (yellow card) 16' (yellow-red card) 90+4'; Veloso 21'; Rrahmani (yellow card) 28'; Faraoni (yellow card) 34'	Stadium: Allianz Stadium; Attendance: 39,945; Referee: Federico La Penna

24 September 2019 5	Hellas Verona	0–0	Udinese	Verona
19:00 CEST (UTC+02:00)		Report	Stryger Larsen (yellow card) 42'; Jajalo (yellow card) 60'; Walace (yellow card) 82'; Becão (yellow card) 90+1'	Stadium: Stadio Marc'Antonio Bentegodi; Attendance: 13,740; Referee: Daniele Chiffi

29 September 2019 6	Cagliari	1–1	Hellas Verona	Cagliari
18:00 CEST (UTC+02:00)	João Pedro 29'; Castro (yellow card) 33'; Pellegrini (yellow card) 64'	Report	Stępiński (yellow card) 31'; Dawidowicz (yellow card) 56'; Faraoni 66'	Stadium: Sardegna Arena; Attendance: 15,846; Referee: Manuel Volpi

5 October 2019 7	Hellas Verona	2–0	Sampdoria	Verona
18:00 CEST (UTC+02:00)	Kumbulla 9'; Lazović (yellow card) 24'; Murru 81' (o.g.)	Report	Ferrari (yellow card) 15'; Chabot (yellow card) 33'; Bonazzoli (yellow card) 41'	Stadium: Stadio Marc'Antonio Bentegodi; Attendance: 17,787; Referee: Michael Fabbri

19 October 2019 8	Napoli	2–0	Hellas Verona	Naples
18:00 CEST (UTC+02:00)	Koulibaly (yellow card) 4'; Milik 37', 67'; Zieliński (yellow card) 83'; Mertens (yellow card) 90+1'	Report	Lazović (yellow card) 15'; Günter (yellow card) 54'; Faraoni (yellow card) 66'	Stadium: Stadio San Paolo; Attendance: 38,686; Referee: Marco Piccinini

25 October 2019 9	Hellas Verona	0–1	Sassuolo	Verona
20:45 CEST (UTC+02:00)	Kumbulla (yellow card) 6'; Günter (yellow card) 10'; Verre (yellow card) 20'; Pessina (yellow card) 36'; Amrabat (yellow card) 40'	Report	Romagna (yellow card) 15'; Defrel (yellow card) 21'; Đuričić 50', (yellow card) 59'; Peluso (yellow card) 60'; Magnanelli (yellow card) 68'	Stadium: Stadio Marc'Antonio Bentegodi; Attendance: 11,453; Referee: Luca Pairetto

29 October 2019 10	Parma	0–1	Hellas Verona	Parma
19:00 CET (UTC+01:00)	Gervinho (yellow card) 90+1'	Report	Lazović 10'; Kumbulla (yellow card) 27'; Verre (yellow card) 36'; Amrabat (yellow card) 51'; Veloso (yellow card) 73'; Zaccagni (yellow card) 90+1'	Stadium: Stadio Ennio Tardini; Attendance: 14,638; Referee: Gianluca Manganiello

3 November 2019 11	Hellas Verona	2–1	Brescia	Verona
15:00 CET (UTC+01:00)	Empereur (yellow card) 20'; Salcedo 50'; Pessina 81'	Report	Martella (yellow card) 5'; Mangraviti (yellow card) 9'; Matějů (yellow card) 36'; Balotelli 85'; Tonali (yellow card) 90+4'; Matri (red card) 90+7'	Stadium: Stadio Marc'Antonio Bentegodi; Attendance: 16,525; Referee: Maurizio Mariani

9 November 2019 12	Internazionale	2–1	Hellas Verona	Milan
18:00 CET (UTC+01:00)	Brozović (yellow card) 32'; Martínez (yellow card) 42'; Vecino 65'; Barella 83', (yellow card) 83'	Report	Verre 19' (pen.); Zaccagni (yellow card) 35'	Stadium: San Siro; Attendance: 66,202; Referee: Paolo Valeri

24 November 2019 13	Hellas Verona	1–0	Fiorentina	Verona
15:00 CET (UTC+01:00)	Di Carmine (yellow card) 3', (goal) 66'; Pessina (yellow card) 19'; Faraoni (yellow card) 61'	Report	Venuti (yellow card) 57'; Milenković (yellow card) 60'	Stadium: Stadio Marc'Antonio Bentegodi; Attendance: 22,581; Referee: Antonio Giua

1 December 2019 14	Hellas Verona	1–3	Roma	Verona
20:45 CET (UTC+01:00)	Faraoni 21'; Günter (yellow card) 44'; Bocchetti (yellow card) 64'; Amrabat (yellow card) 87'	Report	Kluivert 17'; Pellegrini (yellow card) 28'; Perotti 45' (pen.); Mancini (yellow card) 61'; Diawara (yellow card) 70'; Mkhitaryan 90+2'	Stadium: Stadio Marc'Antonio Bentegodi; Attendance: 17,405; Referee: Marco Guida

7 December 2019 15	Atalanta	3–2	Hellas Verona	Bergamo
15:00 CET (UTC+01:00)	Hateboer (yellow card) 20'; Malinovskyi 44'; Muriel 64' (pen.); Djimsiti 90+3'	Report	Di Carmine 23', 57'; Veloso (yellow card) 32'; Bocchetti (yellow card) 41'; Zaccagni (yellow card) 63'; Dawidowicz (yellow card) 68' (yellow-red card) 86'	Stadium: Gewiss Stadium; Attendance: 19,335; Referee: Paolo Valeri

15 December 2019 16	Hellas Verona	3–3	Torino	Verona
12:30 CET (UTC+01:00)	Amrabat (yellow card) 35'; Günter (yellow card) 40'; Veloso (yellow card) 65'; Pazzini 69' (pen.); Verre 76'; Stępiński 84'	Report	Ansaldi 36', 61'; Bremer (yellow card) 52'; Berenguer 55'	Stadium: Stadio Marc'Antonio Bentegodi; Attendance: 16,453; Referee: Federico La Penna

5 January 2020 18	SPAL	0–2	Hellas Verona	Ferrara
15:00 CET (UTC+01:00)	Tomović (red card) 39'; Espeto (yellow card) 45+1'	Report	Pazzini 14'; Zaccagni (yellow card) 66'; Stępiński 86'	Stadium: Stadio Paolo Mazza; Attendance: 18,553; Referee: Marco Guida

12 January 2020 19	Hellas Verona	2–1	Genoa	Verona
18:00 CET (UTC+01:00)	Rrahmani (yellow card) 4'; Amrabat (yellow card) 49'; Verre 55' (pen.), (yellow card) 56'; Zaccagni 65'	Report	Criscito (yellow card) 25'; Schöne (yellow card) 28'; Sanabria 41'; Pandev (yellow card) 52'; Behrami (yellow card) 73'; Cassata (yellow card) 77'; Favilli (yellow card) 79'	Stadium: Stadio Marc'Antonio Bentegodi; Attendance: 14,849; Referee: Maurizio Mariani

19 January 2020 20	Bologna	1–1	Hellas Verona	Bologna
15:00 CET (UTC+01:00)	Bani 20', (yellow card) 35' (yellow-red card) 67'; Sansone (yellow card) 27'; Schouten (yellow card) 55'; Mbaye (yellow card) 76'; Poli (yellow card) 90'	Report	Amrabat (yellow card) 15'; Zaccagni (yellow card) 25'; Borini 81'	Stadium: Stadio Renato Dall'Ara; Attendance: 20,697; Referee: Giovanni Ayroldi

26 January 2020 21	Hellas Verona	3–0	Lecce	Verona
15:00 CET (UTC+01:00)	Dawidowicz 19'; Faraoni (yellow card) 30'; Pessina 34'; Amrabat (yellow card) 65'; Pazzini 87' (pen.)	Report	Tachtsidis (yellow card) 15'; Dell'Orco (yellow card) 58' (yellow-red card) 68'	Stadium: Stadio Marc'Antonio Bentegodi; Attendance: 15,425; Referee: Rosario Abisso

2 February 2020 22	Milan	1–1	Hellas Verona	Milan
15:00 CET (UTC+01:00)	Çalhanoğlu 29'; Hernandez (yellow card) 45+1'	Report	Faraoni 13'; Rrahmani (yellow card) 24'; Amrabat (red card) 68'; Pessina (yellow card) 86'; Borini (yellow card) 90+3'; Silvestri (yellow card) 90+5'	Stadium: San Siro; Attendance: 55,355; Referee: Daniele Chiffi

5 February 2020 17	Lazio	0–0	Hellas Verona	Rome
20:45 CET (UTC+01:00)	Milinković-Savić (yellow card) 29'; Jony (yellow card) 77'; Radu (yellow card) 80'	Report	Kumbulla (yellow card) 23'; Rrahmani (yellow card) 87'	Stadium: Stadio Olimpico; Attendance: 40,000; Referee: Rosario Abisso
Note: Match was originally postponed to 8 January because of Lazio's involvement in the 2019 Supercoppa Italiana, and was further postponed to 5 February.

8 February 2020 23	Hellas Verona	2–1	Juventus	Verona
20:45 CET (UTC+01:00)	Lazović (yellow card) 39'; Pessina (yellow card) 41'; Borini 76'; Pazzini 86' (pen.)	Report	Alex Sandro (yellow card) 20'; Ronaldo 65'; Dybala (yellow card) 75'; Bonucci (yellow card) 85'	Stadium: Stadio Marc'Antonio Bentegodi; Attendance: 28,654; Referee: Davide Massa

16 February 2020 24	Udinese	0–0	Hellas Verona	Udine
12:30 CET (UTC+01:00)	Troost-Ekong (yellow card) 77'	Report	Veloso (yellow card) 56'; Lazović (yellow card) 59'	Stadium: Dacia Arena; Attendance: 22,308; Referee: Eugenio Abbattista

8 March 2020 26	Sampdoria	2–1	Hellas Verona	Genoa
15:00 CET (UTC+01:00)	Vieira (yellow card) 40'; Tonelli (yellow card) 70'; Quagliarella 77', 86' (pen.); Jankto (yellow card) 79'; Linetty (yellow card) 90+7'	Report	Audero 32' (o.g.); Di Carmine (yellow card) 47'; Badu (yellow card) 77'; Dawidowicz (yellow card) 85'	Stadium: Stadio Luigi Ferraris; Attendance: 0 Referee: Paolo Valeri
Note: Match was initially postponed to 13 May from its original date of 2 March due to concerns over the COVID-19 pandemic, but was later moved to 8 March to be played behind closed doors.

20 June 2020 25	Hellas Verona	2–1	Cagliari	Verona
21:45 CEST (UTC+02:00)	Di Carmine 14', 26'; Badu (yellow card) 34'; Borini (red card) 35'	Report	Pereiro (yellow card) 16'; Nández (yellow card) 34'; Simeone 43'; Pisacane (yellow card) 51'; Cigarini (yellow card) 58' (yellow-red card) 70'; Ceppitelli (yellow card) 80'	Stadium: Stadio Marc'Antonio Bentegodi; Attendance: 0 Referee: Gianluca Manganiello
Note: Match was initially postponed to 11 March, then to 20 June, from its original date of 23 February due to concerns over the COVID-19 pandemic, after it was moved to 18 March to be played behind closed doors. On 9 March all sports events in Italy were suspended until 3 April. This was the first match played since the COVID-19 pandemic lockdown in Italy.

23 June 2020 27	Hellas Verona	0–2	Napoli	Verona
19:30 CEST (UTC+02:00)	Faraoni (yellow card) 54'	Report	Milik 38'; Koulibaly (yellow card) 58'; Lozano 90'	Stadium: Stadio Marc'Antonio Bentegodi; Attendance: 0 Referee: Fabrizio Pasqua
Note: Match was postponed to 13 March, then to 23 June, from its original date of 8 March due to schedule shuffling to allow for Sampdoria vs Hellas Verona to be played following its previous postponement due to concerns over the COVID-19 pandemic. All subsequent matches were also shuffled to allow for this accommodation.

28 June 2020 28	Sassuolo	3–3	Hellas Verona	Reggio Emilia
19:30 CEST (UTC+02:00)	Magnani (yellow card) 25'; Boga 53', 77'; Bourabia (yellow card) 70'; Rogério 90+7'	Report	Kumbulla (yellow card) 15'; Lazović 51'; Stępiński (yellow card) 55', (goal) 57'; Pessina 68'	Stadium: Mapei Stadium – Città del Tricolore; Attendance: 0 Referee: Antonio Giua

1 July 2020 29	Hellas Verona	3–2	Parma	Verona
21:45 CEST (UTC+02:00)	Di Carmine 45+2' (pen.); Zaccagni 54'; Empereur (yellow card) 54'; Pessina 81', (yellow card) 90+4'	Report	Barillà (yellow card) 6'; Kulusevski 14'; Iacoponi (yellow card) 15'; Hernani (yellow card) 38'; Gagliolo 64'	Stadium: Stadio Marc'Antonio Bentegodi; Attendance: 0 Referee: Paolo Valeri

5 July 2020 30	Brescia	2–0	Hellas Verona	Brescia
19:30 CEST (UTC+02:00)	Martella (yellow card) 17'; Papetti (yellow card) 43', (goal) 52'; Špalek (yellow card) 80'; Donnarumma 90+6'	Report	Di Carmine (yellow card) 71'	Stadium: Stadio Mario Rigamonti; Attendance: 0 Referee: Marco Piccinini

9 July 2020 31	Hellas Verona	2–2	Internazionale	Verona
21:45 CEST (UTC+02:00)	Lazović 2'; Dimarco (yellow card) 29'; Günter (yellow card) 37'; Amrabat (yellow card) 45+2'; Veloso 86'	Report	Valero (yellow card) 45+2'; Candreva 49'; Dimarco 55' (o.g.); Young (yellow card) 65'	Stadium: Stadio Marc'Antonio Bentegodi; Attendance: 0 Referee: Massimiliano Irrati

12 July 2020 32	Fiorentina	1–1	Hellas Verona	Florence
19:30 CEST (UTC+02:00)	Pulgar (yellow card) 28'; Igor (yellow card) 51'; Milenković (yellow card) 63'; Cutrone 90+6'	Report	Faraoni 18'; Stępiński (yellow card) 88'	Stadium: Stadio Artemio Franchi; Attendance: 0 Referee: Daniele Chiffi

15 July 2020 33	Roma	2–1	Hellas Verona	Rome
21:45 CEST (UTC+02:00)	Veretout 10' (pen.); Džeko 45+3'; Mancini (yellow card) 63'; Zaniolo (yellow card) 71'; Cristante (yellow card) 78'; Villar (yellow card) 90+6'	Report	Veloso (yellow card) 9'; Pessina 47', (yellow card) 67'; Eysseric (yellow card) 90+5'	Stadium: Stadio Olimpico; Attendance: 0 Referee: Fabio Maresca

18 July 2020 34	Hellas Verona	1–1	Atalanta	Verona
17:15 CEST (UTC+02:00)	Amrabat (yellow card) 41'; Pessina 59', (yellow card) 84'	Report	Zapata 50'; Hateboer (yellow card) 64'; Toloi (yellow card) 85'	Stadium: Stadio Marc'Antonio Bentegodi; Attendance: 0 Referee: Rosario Abisso

22 July 2020 35	Torino	1–1	Hellas Verona	Turin
21:45 CEST (UTC+02:00)	Lyanco (yellow card) 39'; Nkoulou (yellow card) 56'; Zaza (yellow card) 59', (goal) 67'; Verdi (yellow card) 60'	Report	Empereur (yellow card) 39'; Borini 56' (pen.); Eysseric (yellow card) 89'	Stadium: Stadio Olimpico Grande Torino; Attendance: 0 Referee: Paolo Valeri

26 July 2020 36	Hellas Verona	1–5	Lazio	Verona
19:30 CEST (UTC+02:00)	Amrabat 38' (pen.); Rrahmani (yellow card) 45+2'; Radunović (yellow card) 90+3'	Report	Immobile 45+6' (pen.), 84', 90+4' (pen.); Milinković-Savić 56'; Correa 63'; Marušić (yellow card) 67'; Strakosha (yellow card) 86'	Stadium: Stadio Marc'Antonio Bentegodi; Attendance: 0 Referee: Manuel Volpi

29 July 2020 37	Hellas Verona	3–0	SPAL	Verona
19:30 CEST (UTC+02:00)	Di Carmine 7', 11'; Faraoni 47'; Eysseric (yellow card) 53'	Report	Dabo (yellow card) 66'	Stadium: Stadio Marc'Antonio Bentegodi; Attendance: 0 Referee: Simone Sozza

2 August 2020 38	Genoa	3–0	Hellas Verona	Genoa
20:45 CEST (UTC+02:00)	Sanabria (yellow card) 6', (goal) 13', 25'; Romero 44', (yellow card) 45+3' (yellow-red card) 62'; Masiello (yellow card) 49'; Cassata (red card) 90+1'	Report	Amrabat (red card) 90+1'	Stadium: Stadio Luigi Ferraris; Attendance: 0 Referee: Massimiliano Irrati

=== Coppa Italia ===
18 August 2019 Third round	Hellas Verona	1–2 (a.e.t.)	Cremonese	Verona
20:30 CEST (UTC+02:00)	Empereur 7'; Veloso (yellow card) 49'		Ravanelli (yellow card) 34'; Soddimo (yellow card) 76'; Claiton (yellow card) 77'; Castagnetti 90+3'; Deli 102'	Stadium: Stadio Marc'Antonio Bentegodi; Attendance: 8,211; Referee: Gianluca Manganiello

== Statistics ==
=== Appearances and goals ===
No.	Pos	Nat	Player	Total		Serie A		Coppa Italia	
No.	Pos	Nat	Player	Apps	Goals	Apps	Goals	Apps	Goals
Goalkeepers
1	GK	(Italy) ITA	Marco Silvestri	36	0	35	0	1	0
22	GK	(Italy) ITA	Alessandro Berardi	0	0	0	0	0	0
96	GK	(Serbia) SRB	Boris Radunović	3	0	3	0	0	0
Defenders
5	DF	(Italy) ITA	Davide Faraoni	37	5	36	5	1	0
6	DF	(Italy) ITA	Matteo Lovato	1	0	0+1	0	0	0
13	DF	(Kosovo) KOS	Amir Rrahmani	37	0	36	0	1	0
15	DF	(Italy) ITA	Salvatore Bocchetti	5	0	3+2	0	0	0
21	DF	(Germany) GER	Koray Günter	33	0	31+1	0	0+1	0
23	DF	(Italy) ITA	Federico Dimarco	13	0	5+8	0	0	0
24	DF	(Albania) ALB	Marash Kumbulla	26	1	25	1	1	0
27	DF	(Poland) POL	Paweł Dawidowicz	15	1	7+8	1	0	0
33	DF	(Brazil) BRA	Alan Empereur	14	1	8+5	0	1	1
98	DF	(Italy) ITA	Claud Adjapong	5	0	2+3	0	0	0
Midfielders
4	MF	(Portugal) POR	Miguel Veloso	35	3	32+2	3	1	0
7	MF	(Ghana) GHA	Emmanuel Agyemang-Badu	10	0	2+8	0	0	0
8	MF	(France) FRA	Valentin Eysseric	6	0	3+3	0	0	0
14	MF	(Italy) ITA	Valerio Verre	33	3	22+10	3	1	0
18	MF	(Brazil) BRA	Lucas Felippe	2	0	0+2	0	0	0
20	MF	(Italy) ITA	Mattia Zaccagni	35	2	26+8	2	0+1	0
25	MF	(Italy) ITA	Andrea Danzi	1	0	0+1	0	0	0
32	MF	(Italy) ITA	Matteo Pessina	35	7	27+8	7	0	0
34	MF	(Morocco) MAR	Sofyan Amrabat	34	1	33+1	1	0	0
88	MF	(Serbia) SRB	Darko Lazović	39	3	37+1	3	1	0
Forwards
9	FW	(Poland) POL	Mariusz Stępiński	21	3	7+14	3	0	0
10	FW	(Italy) ITA	Samuel Di Carmine	22	8	17+5	8	0	0
11	FW	(Italy) ITA	Giampaolo Pazzini	16	4	1+14	4	0+1	0
16	FW	(Italy) ITA	Fabio Borini	14	3	9+5	3	0	0
29	FW	(Italy) ITA	Eddie Salcedo	17	1	7+10	1	0	0
Players transferred out during the season
3	DF	(Italy) ITA	Luigi Vitale	3	0	0+2	0	0+1	0
8	MF	(Scotland) SCO	Liam Henderson	5	0	2+2	0	1	0
12	MF	(Italy) ITA	Daniel Bessa	0	0	0	0	0	0
16	FW	(Ivory Coast) CIV	Abdoullaye Traoré	0	0	0	0	0	0
17	DF	(Italy) ITA	Alessandro Crescenzi	0	0	0	0	0	0
19	FW	(Slovakia) SVK	Ľubomír Tupta	1	0	0	0	1	0
23	FW	(Italy) ITA	Antonio Di Gaudio	0	0	0	0	0	0
29	DF	(Italy) ITA	Alberto Almici	0	0	0	0	0	0
66	FW	(Italy) ITA	Gennaro Tutino	7	0	2+4	0	1	0

Last updated: 2 August 2020
Source: Competitions

=== Goalscorers ===
Rank	No.	Pos	Nat	Name	Serie A	Coppa Italia	Total
1	10	FW	(Italy)	Samuel Di Carmine	8	0	8
2	32	MF	(Italy)	Matteo Pessina	7	0	7
3	5	DF	(Italy)	Davide Faraoni	5	0	5
4	11	FW	(Italy)	Giampaolo Pazzini	4	0	4
5	14	MF	(Italy)	Valerio Verre	3	0	3
5	4	MF	(Portugal)	Miguel Veloso	3	0	3
5	9	FW	(Poland)	Mariusz Stępiński	3	0	3
5	88	MF	(Serbia)	Darko Lazović	3	0	3
5	16	FW	(Italy)	Fabio Borini	3	0	3
10	20	MF	(Italy)	Mattia Zaccagni	2	0	2
11	24	DF	(Albania)	Marash Kumbulla	1	0	1
11	27	DF	(Poland)	Paweł Dawidowicz	1	0	1
11	29	FW	(Italy)	Eddie Salcedo	1	0	1
11	34	MF	(Morocco)	Sofyan Amrabat	1	0	1
11	33	DF	(Brazil)	Alan Empereur	0	1	1
Own goal					2	0	2
Totals					47	1	48

Last updated: 29 July 2020

=== Clean sheets ===
Rank	No.	Pos	Nat	Name	Serie A	Coppa Italia	Total
1	1	GK	(Italy)	Marco Silvestri	8	0	8
Totals					8	0	8

Last updated: 8 February 2020

=== Disciplinary record ===
No.	Pos	Nat	Name	Serie A			Coppa Italia			Total		
No.	Pos	Nat	Name	Booked	(yellow card) (yellow-red card)	Sent off (straight red)	Booked	(yellow card) (yellow-red card)	Sent off (straight red)	Booked	(yellow card) (yellow-red card)	Sent off (straight red)
1	GK	(Italy)	Marco Silvestri	2	0	0	0	0	0	2	0	0
5	DF	(Italy)	Davide Faraoni	4	0	0	0	0	0	4	0	0
13	DF	(Kosovo)	Amir Rrahmani	4	0	0	0	0	0	4	0	0
15	DF	(Italy)	Salvatore Bocchetti	2	0	0	0	0	0	2	0	0
21	DF	(Germany)	Koray Günter	6	0	0	0	0	0	6	0	0
24	DF	(Albania)	Marash Kumbulla	4	1	0	0	0	0	4	1	0
27	DF	(Poland)	Paweł Dawidowicz	1	1	1	0	0	0	1	1	1
33	DF	(Brazil)	Alan Empereur	1	0	0	0	0	0	1	0	0
4	MF	(Portugal)	Miguel Veloso	4	0	0	1	0	0	5	0	0
8	MF	(Scotland)	Liam Henderson	1	0	0	0	0	0	1	0	0
14	MF	(Italy)	Valerio Verre	4	0	0	0	0	0	4	0	0
20	MF	(Italy)	Mattia Zaccagni	5	0	0	0	0	0	5	0	0
32	MF	(Italy)	Matteo Pessina	4	0	0	0	0	0	4	0	0
34	MF	(Morocco)	Sofyan Amrabat	8	0	1	0	0	0	8	0	1
88	MF	(Serbia)	Darko Lazović	3	0	0	0	0	0	3	0	0
9	FW	(Poland)	Mariusz Stępiński	1	0	1	0	0	0	1	0	1
10	FW	(Italy)	Samuel Di Carmine	1	0	0	0	0	0	1	0	0
16	FW	(Italy)	Fabio Borini	1	0	0	0	0	0	1	0	0
Totals				56	2	3	1	0	0	57	2	3

Last updated: 8 February 2020
