= List of awards and nominations received by Diamond Platnumz =

Diamond awards and nominations
Awards and nominations
Award	Wins	Nominations
HiPipo Music Awards	1	0
Top Ten Tube Music Awards	1	0
The Future Africa Awards	1	0
Nzumari Awards	1	0
MTV Europe Music Awards	3	5
MTV Africa Music Awards	1	12
BET Awards	0	2
African Muzik Magazine Awards	1	4
Tanzania Music Awards	17	11
IRAWMA Awards	1	1
AFRIMMA Awards	6	9
HIRONIMO MHAPA Awards	0	1
Channel O Music Video Awards	3	1

Totals (Note: Certain award groups do not simply award one winner. They acknowledge several different recipients, have runners-up, and have third place. Since this is a specific recognition and is different from losing an award, runner-up mentions are considered wins in this award tally. For simplification and to avoid errors, each award in this list has been presumed to have had a prior nomination.)
- Wins: 28
- Nominations: 38

Diamond Platnumz is a Tanzanian recording artist, dancer, philanthropist and businessman.

On 3 May 2013, Diamond Platnumz set a new record at the Tanzania Music Awards by winning 7 awards, including Best Male Writer, Best Male Artist, Best Song Writer and Best Male Entertainer of the Year. The previous record was set by 20%, a recording artist who walked away with 5 awards at the 2011 Tanzania Music Awards where diamond left empty handed. Prior to accomplishments, Diamond held the record for winning 4 awards at the 2010 Tanzania Music Awards.

== Afro X Digital Awards ==
Year	Nominee / work	Award	Result
2021	"Kamata"	Music Video Of The Year	Won

== WatsUp TV Africa Music Video Awards ==
Year	Nominee / work	Award	Result	Ref
2016	"Kidogo"	African Video of the Year	Won	
2016	"Kidogo"	Best African Combo Video	Won	
2016	"Kidogo"	Best African Performance	Nominated	
2016	"Kidogo"	Best African Male Video	Won	
2016	"Kidogo"	Best East African Video	Nominated	

== Channel O Music Video Awards ==
Year	Nominee / work	Award	Result
2014	"Number One"	Most Gifted Newcomer	Won
2014	"Number One"	Most Gifted East	Won
2014	"Number One"	Most Gifted Afro Pop	Won
2014	"Number One"	Most Gifted Video of the Year	Nominated

== HiPipo Music Awards ==
Year	Nominee / work	Award	Result
2015	"Number One"	East Africa Superhit	Won
2016	"Nana by Diamond Platnumz"	East Africa Superhit	Won
2016	"Nana by Diamond Platnumz Ft Mr Flavour"	East Africa Best Video	Won
2017	"Diamond Platnumz"	Quinquennial Africa Music Vanguard Award	Won
2017	"Salome by Diamond Platnumz ft Rayvanny"	East Africa Best Video	Won
2018	"Marry You"	Africa Song of the Year	Won
2018	"Eneka"	East Africa Best Video	Won

== Top Ten Tube Music Awards ==
Year	Nominee / work	Award	Result
2014	"Diamond Platnumz"	Best Artist East Africa	Won

=== The Headies ===
Year	Nominee / work	Award	Result
2014	Himself	African Artiste of the Year	Nominated

== The Future Africa Awards ==
Year	Nominee / work	Award	Result
2014	Himself	Prize in Entertainment	Won

=== Nzumari Awards ===
Year	Nominee / work	Award	Result
2012	"Diamond"	Best Male Artist – Tanzania	Won

== MTV Europe Music Awards ==
Year	Nominee / work	Award	Result
2014	Diamond	Best African Act	Nominated
2015	Diamond	Best African Act	Won
2015	Diamond	Best African and Indian Act	Won

== MTV Africa Music Awards ==
Year	Nominee / work	Award	Result
2010	Diamond	Best New Artist	Nominated
2014	Diamond	Best Male	Nominated
2014	Diamond (featuring Davido)	Best Collaboration	Nominated
2015	Diamond	Best Male	Nominated
2015	Diamond	Best Collaboration (BumBum Ft Iyanya)	Nominated
2015	Diamond	Best Live Act	Won
2016	Diamond	Best Male Artist	Nominated
2016	Diamond	Artist of the year	Nominated

== BET Awards ==
Year	Nominee / work	Award	Result
2014	Diamond	Best International Act: Africa	Nominated
2016	Diamond	Best International Act: Africa	Nominated
2021	Diamond	Best International Act: Africa	Nominated

== African Muzik Magazine Awards ==
Year	Nominee / work	Award	Result
2014	Himself	Best Male East Africa	Won
2014	Himself	Artist of the Year	Nominated
2014	"Number One"	Best Video of the Year	Nominated
2014	"Number One Remix"	Best Collabo	Nominated
2014	"Number One Remix"	Song of the Year	Nominated
2015	Himself	Best Male Artist East Africa	Won
2015	Nana	Video of the year	Won
2015	Himself	Artist Of The Year	Won
2015	Alive with Bracket	Afrimma Best Insipirational Song	Won
2015	Nana Ft Flavour N'abania	Best Collaboration	Nominated
2015	Nana	Best Dance Video	Nominated
2015	Nitampata Wapi	Song Of The Year	Nominated
2020	Himself	Best Male East Africa	Won

== Tanzania Music Awards ==
Year	Nominee / work	Award	Result
2010	Diamond	Best Upcoming Artist	Won
2010	"Kamwambie"	Best Song	Won
2010	"Kamwambie"	Best R&B Song	Won
2011	Diamond	Best Male Singer	Nominated
2011	Diamond	Best Male Artist	Nominated
2011	Diamond	Best Afro Pop Song "Mbagala"	Nominated
2011	Diamond	Best Video "Mbagala"	Nominated
2012	Diamond	Best Male Artist	Won
2012	Diamond	Best Song Writer	Won
2012	Diamond	Best Male Singer	Nominated
2012	"Moyo Wangu"	Best Music Video	Won
2012	"Moyo Wangu"	Best Song of the year	Nominated
2012	"Moyo Wangu"	Afro Pop Song of the Year	Nominated
2013	Diamond	Best Male Artist	Won
2013	Diamond	Best Male Singer	Won
2014	Diamond	Best Male Artist	Won
2014	Diamond	Best Male Writer	Won
2014	Diamond	Best Male Entertainer of the Year	Won
2014	"Muziki Gani" (Nay Wamitego featuring Diamond)	Best Collaboration Song	Won
2014	"Number One"	Best Afro Pop Song	Won
2014	"Number One"	Best Music Video	Won
2014	"Number One"	Song of the year	Won
2015	Diamond	Best Male Artist	Nominated
2015	Diamond	Best Male Performer	Nominated
2015	Diamond	Songwriter of the Year	Nominated
2015	Mdogo Mdogo	Afro Pop Song of the Year	Nominated
2015	Mdogo Mdogo	Video of the Year	Won
2015	Nitampata Wapi	Best Zouk/Rhumba Song	Won
2015	Kerewa	Best Collaboration	Nominated
2024	Best Male Artist of the Year	"Shu!"	Won
2024	Best Male Performer of the Year	"Shu!"	Won
2024	Best Song of the Year	"Shu!"	Nominated
2024	Best Song of the Year	"Enjoy"	Nominated
2024	Best Collaboration of the Year	"Enjoy"	Won
2024	Best Collaboration of the Year	"Achii"	Nominated
2024	Best Dance Music of the Year	"Achii"	Won
2024	Best Male Bongo Flava Singer of the Year	"Yatapita"	Nominated
2024	Best Bongo Flava Song of the Year	"Yatapita"	Nominated

== People's Choice Awards ==
Year	Nominee / work	Award	Result
2014	My Number One	Favourite Male Video	Won
2015	Diamond	Favourite Male Artist	Nominated

== AFRIMA ==
Year	Nominee/ work	Award	Result
2019	"Inama" (featuring Fally Ipupa)	Song of The Year	Nominated
2019	"Inama" (featuring Fally Ipupa)	Best Collaboration	Nominated
2019	"Inama" (featuring Fally Ipupa)	AFRIMMA Video of The Year	Nominated
2019	Himself	Best Live Act	Won
2019	Himself	Artist of The Year	Nominated
2019	Himself	Best Male East Africa	Nominated
