= Abd Traore =

Guinean entrepreneur and television executive

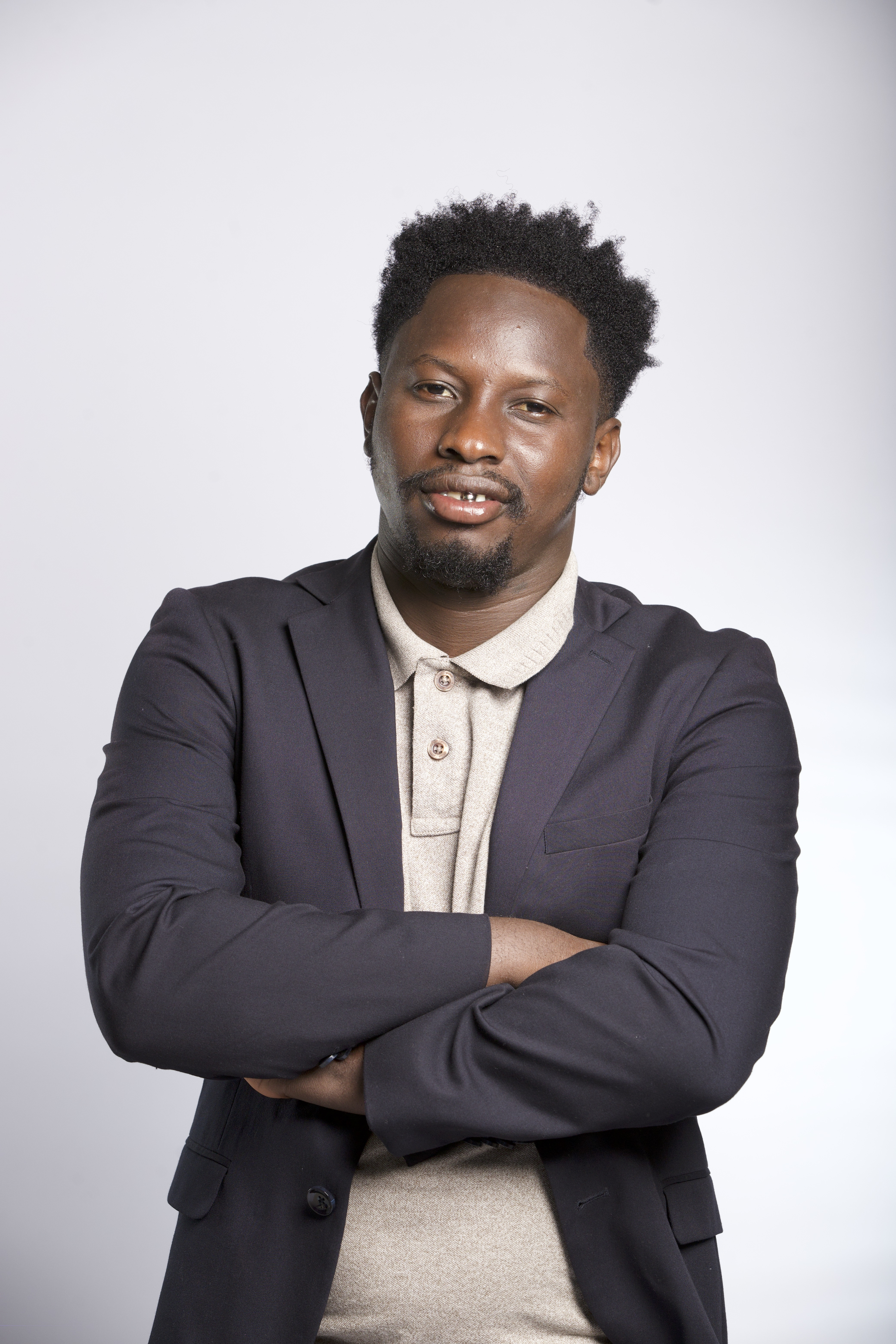
- Born: Abdoulaye Traore
- Occupation: Entrepreneur
- Organization(s): Founder, CEO of WatsUp TV
- Relatives: Iya Traore
- Awards: 100 Most Influential African 2018

Abd Traore is a Guinean entertainment entrepreneur and television executive who is founder and CEO of WatsUp TV, WatsUp Magazine, 369 Live and Shob Group.

== Early life ==
Abdoulaye Traore known as Abd Traore was born in Guinea, but grew up and schooled in Kuala Lumpur, Malaysia. In 2010 he moved to Ghana, where he studied graphic and web design at IPMC.

== Career ==
He is the CEO of WatsUp Co, the entertainment company that produces WatsUp TV and organises the annual WatsUp TV Africa Music Video Awards which recognises African Music Videos and Artistes. He has produced WatsUp TV which is noted be a leading pan-African TV Show across the continent airing on DSTV & Canal+ Channels. In 2016, his show ranked as the Most Influential TV Show in Ghana in the annual Ghana Social Media Rankings.

In March 2018, he launched his first entertainment music magazine named WatsUp Magazine, which was covered by Afrobeat highlife Ghanaian artist Bisa Kdei.

== Recognition ==
In 2017, Busy JUMP referred to him as a rising media entrepreneur, and he was also nominated for the prestigious Africa Youth Awards in the Media Personality of the year category. WatsUp TV has also consistently being nominated in the Ghana Startup Awards organised by The African Network of Entrepreneur and Jack Daniel's Ghana Nightlife Awards.

In 2018 and 2020, Traore was ranked among 100 Most Influential Young Africans a prestigious annual ranking of young people across Africa. His TV Show, WatsUp TV was awarded the TV Show of the Year at the 2018 Jack Daniel's Ghana Nightlife Awards in Accra.
