= Amrabat =

Amrabat is a surname. Notable people with the surname include:

- Nordin Amrabat (born 1987), Dutch-born Moroccan footballer
- Sofyan Amrabat (born 1996), Dutch-born Moroccan footballer
