= Abdoulaye Traoré =

Abdoulaye Traoré may refer to:

- Abdoulaye Traoré (athlete) (born 1959), Malian Olympic athlete
- Abdoulaye Traoré (director) (born 1992), Guinean film director, screenwriter, and producer
- Abdoulaye Traoré (footballer, born 1967)), Ivorian football forward
- Abdoulaye Traoré (Malian footballer) (born 1970), Malian football midfielder
- Abdoulaye Traoré (Burkinabé footballer) (born 1974), Burkinabé football attacking midfielder
- Abdoulaye Traoré (footballer, born 2003), Ivorian football winger for Zulte Waregem

== See also ==
- Abdoullaye Traoré (born 2000), Ivorian football forward
