= Abdoulaye Traoré (director) =

Guinean film director and screenwriter

- Born: January 2, 1992 (age 34); Kankan, Guinea
- Occupations: Filmmaker, screenwriter, producer
- Years active: 2007–present

Abdoulaye Traoré (born January 2, 1992) is a Guinean film director, screenwriter, and producer. He is best known for the film Le Destin de Bineta (2023) and his active role in promoting Guinean cinema through SGCM and the Festival International du Film Espoir (FIFE).

== Biography ==
Abdoulaye Traoré was born in Kankan, Guinea, and grew up between West Africa and Qatar. Though he earned a degree in law, he turned to filmmaking in 2007 as a self-taught director.

He is the founder of SGCM (Société Générale du Cinéma et Musique), a production company based in Guinea, and has directed several films and documentaries addressing social issues. He is also an organizer of FIFE, a film festival promoting African cinema and youth empowerment.

== Career ==
In 2023, Traoré wrote and directed Le Destin de Bineta, a drama exploring social and family pressures faced by a young Guinean girl. The film premiered at the Centre Culturel Franco-Guinéen in Conakry on June 23, 2023.

In addition to his work as a director, Traoré plays a key role in developing Guinea's audiovisual infrastructure through initiatives such as the Ciné Positif campaign and the FIFE film festival.

== Filmography ==
=== Feature films ===
- Le Destin de Bineta (2023) – Director, screenwriter, producer

=== Short films ===
- L’Existence (2023) – Director, producer
- On Veut Tous Aller à l’École (2020) – Director, producer
- Matou Face à l’Échec (2010) – Co-director
- La Fille d’Autrui (2010) – Co-director

=== Documentaries ===
- Culture Baga (2021) – Director, producer

=== Other projects ===
- Ne Vas Pas – Immigration Clandestine 1 (2013) – Co-director
- Ebola awareness film (2014) – Director
- Alerte Rouge COVID-19 (2020) – Director

== Awards and recognition ==
- Organizer and programming committee member of the Festival International du Film Espoir (2023–2024)
