= Boubacar Traoré =

Boubacar Traoré may refer to:

- Boubacar Traoré (musician) (born 1942), Malian guitarist and singer
- Boubacar Traore (runner) (born 1971), Guinean marathon runner and political activist
- Boubacar Traoré (basketball) (born 1946), Senegalese basketball player
- Boubacar Traorè (footballer, born 1997), Senegalese footballer
- Boubacar Traoré (footballer, born 1998), Malian footballer for Naft Maysan FC
- Boubacar Traoré (footballer, born 1999), Malian footballer for MC Oran
- Boubacar Traoré (footballer, born 2001), Malian footballer
- Boubacar Traore (American football), American football player

== See also ==
- Traoré
