= Boris Radunović =

Serbian footballer (born 1996)

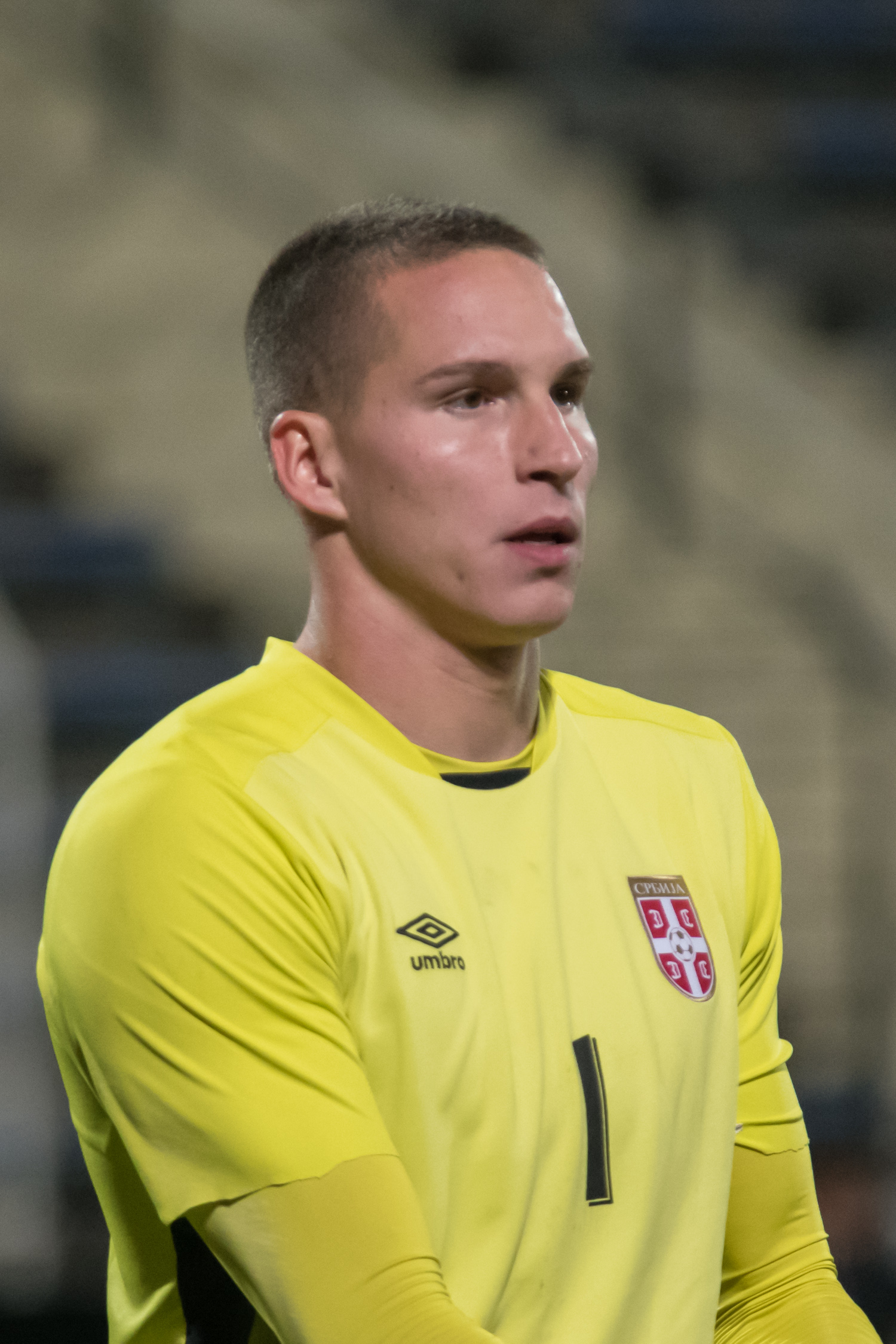
- Radunović with Serbia U21 in 2017

Personal information
- Date of birth: 26 May 1996 (age 30)
- Place of birth: Belgrade, FR Yugoslavia
- Height: 1.94 m (6 ft 4 in)
- Position: Goalkeeper

Team information
- Current team: Cagliari
- Number: 23

Senior career*
Years	Team	Apps	(Gls)
2013–2015	Rad	22	(0)
2015–2021	Atalanta	1	(0)
2016–2017	→ Avellino (loan)	31	(0)
2017–2018	→ Salernitana (loan)	36	(0)
2018–2019	→ Cremonese (loan)	10	(0)
2019–2020	→ Verona (loan)	3	(0)
2021–	Cagliari	48	(0)
2024–2025	→ Bari (loan)	37	(0)
2026	→ Spezia (loan)	16	(0)

International career^{‡}
2011	Serbia U16		
2013–2014	Serbia U18		
2014–2015	Serbia U19	1	(0)
2015–2019	Serbia U21	18	(0)
- * Club domestic league appearances and goals as of 13 May 2026 ‡ National team caps and goals as of 21 June 2019

Boris Radunović (Serbian Cyrillic: Борис Радуновић, pronounced [bǒ:ris radǔːnoʋitɕ, bôː-]; born 26 May 1996) is a Serbian professional footballer who plays as a goalkeeper for Serie A club Cagliari.

== Club career ==
=== Rad ===
Radunović made his professional debut for Rad on his 17th birthday, 26 May 2013, in a Serbian SuperLiga match versus Radnički Niš, when he was substituted on for Filip Kljajić.

=== Atalanta ===
On 18 July 2015, Atalanta confirmed the signing of Radunović for an undisclosed fee.

On 31 July 2018, Radunović joined Cremonese on loan until 30 June 2019.

On 15 July 2019, he joined Hellas Verona on loan until 30 June 2020.

=== Cagliari Calcio ===
On 11 July 2021, he signed a four-year contract with Serie A club Cagliari.

On 1 August 2024, Radunović moved on loan to Bari.

On 4 January 2026, Radunović moved on loan to Spezia.

== International career ==
In October 2019, Radunović received his first call-up to the Serbia senior national team for two a UEFA Euro qualifying matches against Portugal and Lithuania. He remained unused in both matches, and only returned to the national set-up in August 2023, for two UEFA Euro 2024 qualifying matches against Hungary and Lithuania.

== Personal life ==
He is a twin brother of Pavle Radunović.

== Career statistics ==
As of match played 12 April 2026

Appearances and goals by club, season and competition
Club	Season	League			National Cup		Continental		Other		Total	
Club	Season	Division	Apps	Goals	Apps	Goals	Apps	Goals	Apps	Goals	Apps	Goals
Rad	2012–13	Serbian SuperLiga	1	0	0	0	0	0	—		1	0
Rad	2013–14	Serbian SuperLiga	0	0	0	0	0	0	—		0	0
Rad	2014–15	Serbian SuperLiga	21	0	3	0	0	0	—		24	0
Rad	Total		22	0	3	0	0	0	—		25	0
Atalanta	2015–16	Serie A	1	0	0	0	—		—		1	0
Atalanta	2020–21	Serie A	0	0	0	0	0	0	—		0	0
Atalanta	Total		1	0	0	0	0	0	—		1	0
Avelino (loan)	2016–17	Serie B	31	0	0	0	—		—		31	0
Salernitana (loan)	2017–18	Serie B	36	0	0	0	—		—		36	0
Cremonese (loan)	2018–19	Serie B	10	0	1	0	—		—		11	0
Verona (loan)	2019–20	Serie A	3	0	0	0	—		—		3	0
Cagliari	2021–22	Serie A	3	0	2	0	—		—		5	0
Cagliari	2022–23	Serie B	38	0	1	0	—		5	0	44	0
Cagliari	2023–24	Serie A	7	0	3	0	—		—		10	0
Cagliari	2025–26	Serie A	0	0	0	0	—		—		0	0
Cagliari	2026–27	Serie A	0	0	0	0	—		—		0	0
Cagliari	Total		48	0	6	0	—		5	0	59	0
Bari (loan)	2024–25	Serie B	37	0	1	0	—		—		38	0
Spezia (loan)	2025–26	Serie B	16	0	—		—		—		16	0
Career total			204	0	11	0	0	0	5	0	220	0
