= Mamadou Traoré =

Mamadou Traoré may refer to:

- Mamadou Traoré (murderer) (born 1973), Senegalese-born French serial rapist and murderer
- Mamadou Traoré (footballer, born 1994), Malian footballer
- Mamadou Traoré (footballer, born 2002), Malian footballer
- Mamadou Lamine Traoré (1947–2007), Malian politician
- Mamadou Namory Traoré, Malian politician
