= WatsUp TV =

Television Channel

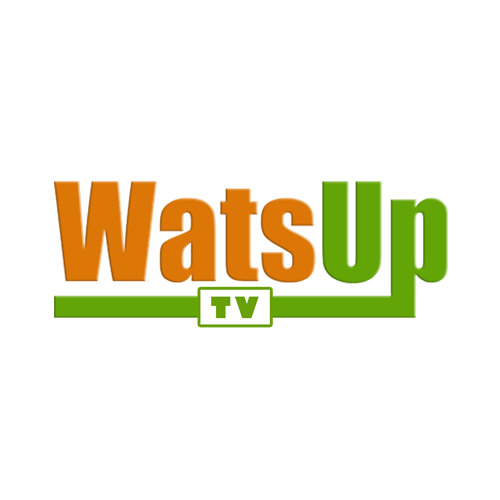
- Country: Ghana

Programming
- Picture format: 16:9, 576i (SDTV) 16:9, 1080i (HDTV)

Ownership
- Owner: Abd Traore

History
- Launched: 28 August 2014

Links
- Website: www.watsup.tv

WatsUp TV is a 24 hour digital entertainment Television channel made for the Pan-African Bi-Lingual community and also aired on various television channels across Africa founded by Abd Traore.

Its award, the WatsUp TV Africa Music Video Awards (WAMVA) was launched on 29 September 2016 in Accra, Ghana and on 28 December 2016, winners of the maiden edition of the Awards were announced in a ceremony that hosted industry players and the media.

The CEO of WatsUp TV, Mr Abd Traore launched its sister company named WatsUp Magazine on 14 March 2018, an Entertainment Music Magazine and its first edition was covered by Afrobeat highlife Ghanaian Artist Bisa Kdei.

== History ==
The brand was launched as a TV show on 28 August 2014 at the High Gate Hotel in Accra, followed by a public performance by the International Football Freestyler Iya Traore at the Marina Mall.

It was ranked the 9th most influential program on social media in Ghana in 2014, the 2nd most influential TV program in on social media in Ghana in 2015, and the most influential program on social media in Ghana in 2016.

In July 2016, WatsUp TV launched in Guinea Conakry on Evasion Guinee TV, which airs on Canal +.

In 2018, WatsUp TV hosted the 66th annual Legon Hall Concert which was headlined by Mayorkun and hosted Le Planet Concert in Burkina Faso which was also headlined by Ghanaian Acts, EL and Epixode and Ibah One from Mali.

In 2020, WatsUp TV launched its 24 hours digital channel in Accra and was nominated for the 10th RTP Awards for Best Entertainment TV Program.

== TV shows ==
The WatsUp TV content features music videos from Africa, interviews with celebrities and industry players across the African Continent with custom-made entertainment. They are:

- #FansTweetRequest- This segment allows Twitter users of the show to send in requests, shout outs and messages directly to their friends, family and loved ones on TV.
- News- This will serve entertainment news, current and informative news from across Africa and the rest of the world.
- Watsup TV Interviews- This brings viewers exclusive one on one interview with all top celebrities across Africa.
- Fresh Videos- The Fresh Videos segment features the just-released music videos across the continent.
- Spit on it- Features celebrities and upcoming musicians as they put up their rapping gears and bars over the microphone.
- Event Report- This gets viewers updates from previous and current events, red carpets, concerts, nightlife and award shows.
- Now Showing- This broadcasts previews of blockbuster movies to hit theatres in Africa, the USA, and other countries across the world.
- Top 5- Celebrities from the worlds of music, movies, and sports unveil their own top five videos and then host the segment sharing their reasons for selecting the songs.
- Fresh Videos
- #FansTweetRequest
- Event Report
- African Hit

=== Top 10 Naija, Top 10 Franco Vibes & Top 10 GH ===
- Top 10 Naija is a Nigerian music video Top 10 countdown in which the viewers vote for their favourite music video to be included in the countdown
- Top 10 Franco Vibes is a French music video Top 10 countdown in which the viewers vote for their favourite music video to be included in the countdown
- Top 10 GH is a Ghanaian music video Top 10 countdown in which the viewers vote for their favourite music video to be included in the countdown
- #FansTweetRequest
- Celebrity Interviews (French Version)

== Channels ==
WatsUp TV also produced content for the following TV channels (as a TV show):

- Evasion Guinee ( Canal + )
- Viasat 1
- GH One TV
- TV 7
- ETV Ghana
- Max TV
- EBN Channel
- 3TV (Canal +)
