= Le Destin de Bineta =

- Directed by: Abdoulaye Traoré
- Written by: Abdoulaye Traoré
- Produced by: Abdoulaye Traoré; Société Générale du Cinéma et Musique (SGCM Prod)
- Starring: Fatoumata Condé; Toucha Syllah; Mory Syllah; Ousmane Camara; Mabety Camara; Mariame Fofana; Mamoudou Kanté; Malon Magassouba
- Cinematography: Abdoulaye Traoré, Baldé Abdoulaye
- Edited by: Manet Mouloukou Souleymane
- Production company: SGCM Prod
- Release date: 23 June 2023
- Running time: 90 minutes
- Country: Guinea
- Language: French

Le Destin de Bineta (English The Fate of Bineta) is a 2023 Guinean drama film directed by Abdoulaye Traoré and produced by La Société Générale du Cinéma et Musique (SGCM Prod).

== Synopsis ==
Bineta, a young girl orphaned by her mother's death, faces even greater tragedy when her father is poisoned by his own family members, who are after his inheritance. After her father's death, she is thrown out of her home by her uncle. However, she is taken in by a kind woman who supports her and helps her continue her education. Despite the challenges, Bineta's determination allows her to succeed and build a stable life, fulfilling the dreams her father had for her.

== Cast ==
- Fatoumata Condé
- Toucha Syllah
- Mory Syllah
- Ousmane Camara
- Mabety Camara
- Mariame Fofana
- Mamoudou Kanté
- Malon Magassouba

== Technical details ==
- Director: Abdoulaye Traoré
- Assistant Director: Kanté Mamoudou
- Writers: Abdoulaye Traoré, Manet Mouloukou Souleymane, Mansaré Mathieu, Cissoko Laouratou
- Cinematography: Abdoulaye Traoré, Baldé Abdoulaye
- Editing: Manet Mouloukou Souleymane
- Costumes: Camara N'nady
- Production Company: Société Générale du Cinéma et Musique (SGCM Prod)
- Distribution: Société Générale du Cinéma et Musique (SGCM Prod)

The film explores complex social themes affecting African families, highlighting the trials and dilemmas individuals face. With high-quality production, it aims to raise awareness of Guinea's cultural and societal issues.

== Production background ==
The film was supported by Société Générale du Cinéma et Musique (SGCM Prod), a key player in promoting Guinean cinema. It premiered on June 23, 2023, at the Franco-Guinean Cultural Center CCFG and was praised for its realistic portrayal of the country's social realities.

== Reception ==
The film received positive reviews for addressing sensitive subjects with realism and emotion, solidifying its place as a significant testament to contemporary Guinean cinema.
