= Abou Traoré =

Guinean politician

Aou Traoré

Deputy in the National Assembly (Guinea), Rapporteur of the Commission for Environnement, Fisheries, and durable Rural Development
- President: Alpha Conde
- Preceded by: Kaba Kourouma
- Constituency: Faranah

Personal details
- Party: Rally of the Guinean People

Abou Traoré is a Guinean politician who represents the constituency of Faranah Prefecture. He is a member of the Majority Rally of the Guinean People Party of former president Alpha Conde.
