= Mamadou Namory Traoré =

Malian politician

Mamadou Namory Traoré is the Minister of Public Employees, of Governance and of Administrative and Political Reforms of Mali since 24 April 2012. In October 2021, he was retired from the army.
