= Mohamed Traoré =

Mohamed Traoré may refer to:

- Kalilou Traoré (1987-2026), Malian footballer who played in Switzerland
- Mohamed Traoré (footballer, born 1988), Malian footballer
- Mohamed Traoré (footballer, born 1991), Guinean footballer
- Mohamed Traoré (footballer, born 1993), Guinean footballer
- Moha Traoré, Spanish footballer
- Mohamed Traore (footballer, born 2002), Senegalese footballer
