= Alyssa Traoré =

Dutch fashion model

- Born: Alyssa Fatou Traoré; 7 September 1998 (age 27); Nijmegen, Gelderland, Netherlands
- Occupation: Model
- Modeling information
- Height: 1.78 m (5 ft 10 in)
- Hair color: Brown
- Eye color: Brown
- Agency: IMG Models (worldwide); Traffic Models (Barcelona); It's me Model Management

Alyssa Fatou Traoré is a Dutch fashion model. She was one of the first people discovered via IMG Models' "We Love Your Genes" initiative.

== Early life and career ==
Traoré is of Dutch and Ivorian heritage and grew up in Nijmegen, Gelderland, Netherlands. At age 11, she was originally discovered by a scout in Amsterdam though in order to expand her career opportunities, she used the We Love Your Genes initiative on Instagram to get connected to IMG Models, who signed her weeks later. Traoré debuted at Jacquemus in Paris. She has also walked the runway for Burberry, Loewe, Erdem, Sonia Rykiel, Missoni, Giambattista Valli, Elie Saab, John Galliano, Roberto Cavalli, Prada, Dior, Calvin Klein (the show which took place on her 19th birthday). Traoré has appeared in campaigns for Prada, and Calvin Klein.

She has appeared in editorials for Elle Vogue Italia, Vogue Korea, and others.
