= Ousmane Traoré (footballer, born 1985) =

Senegalese footballer

Ousmane Traore
Personal information
- Date of birth: 15 February 1985 (age 41)
- Place of birth: Senegal
- Height: 1.72 m (5 ft 8 in)
- Position: Forward

Senior career*
Years	Team	Apps	(Gls)
2000–2001	Livorno B		
2001–2005	Grenoble B		
2005–2006	CO Châlons		
2006	Roye		
2006–2007	Sedan B		
2007–2008	Reims Sainte-Anne	0	(0)
2008–2010	Beveren	17	(5)
2010–2012	Turnhout	53	(18)
2012–2013	Laval	12	(0)
2013–2014	FC Dieppe	7	(0)
2015–2016	FC Vevey United		
- * Club domestic league appearances and goals

Ousmane Traoré (born 16 February 1985) is a Senegalese former professional footballer who played as a forward.

== Career ==
Good performances for K.S.K. Beveren and KFC Turnhout in the Belgian Second Division earned Traoré a move to Ligue 2 club Laval.
