= Dambou Traoré =

French footballer (born 1977)

Personal information
- Date of birth: 27 November 1977 (age 48)
- Place of birth: Paris, France
- Height: 1.79 m (5 ft 10 in)
- Position: Midfielder

Senior career*
Years	Team	Apps	(Gls)
1996–2000	Créteil	41	(2)
2000–2001	Red Star	26	(0)
2001–2003	Athinaikos		
2003–2006	Créteil	13	(0)
2008–2009	Ivry		
2009–2011	Viry-Châtillon		

International career
2000–2001	Mali	2	(0)
- * Club domestic league appearances and goals

Dambou Traoré (born 27 November 1977) is a French former professional footballer who played as a midfielder. He played on the professional level in Ligue 2 for US Créteil-Lusitanos and earned two caps with the Mali national team in 2000 and 2001.
