= Sofyan Amrabat =

Morocco international footballer (born 1996)

Sofyan Amrabat سفيان أمرابط
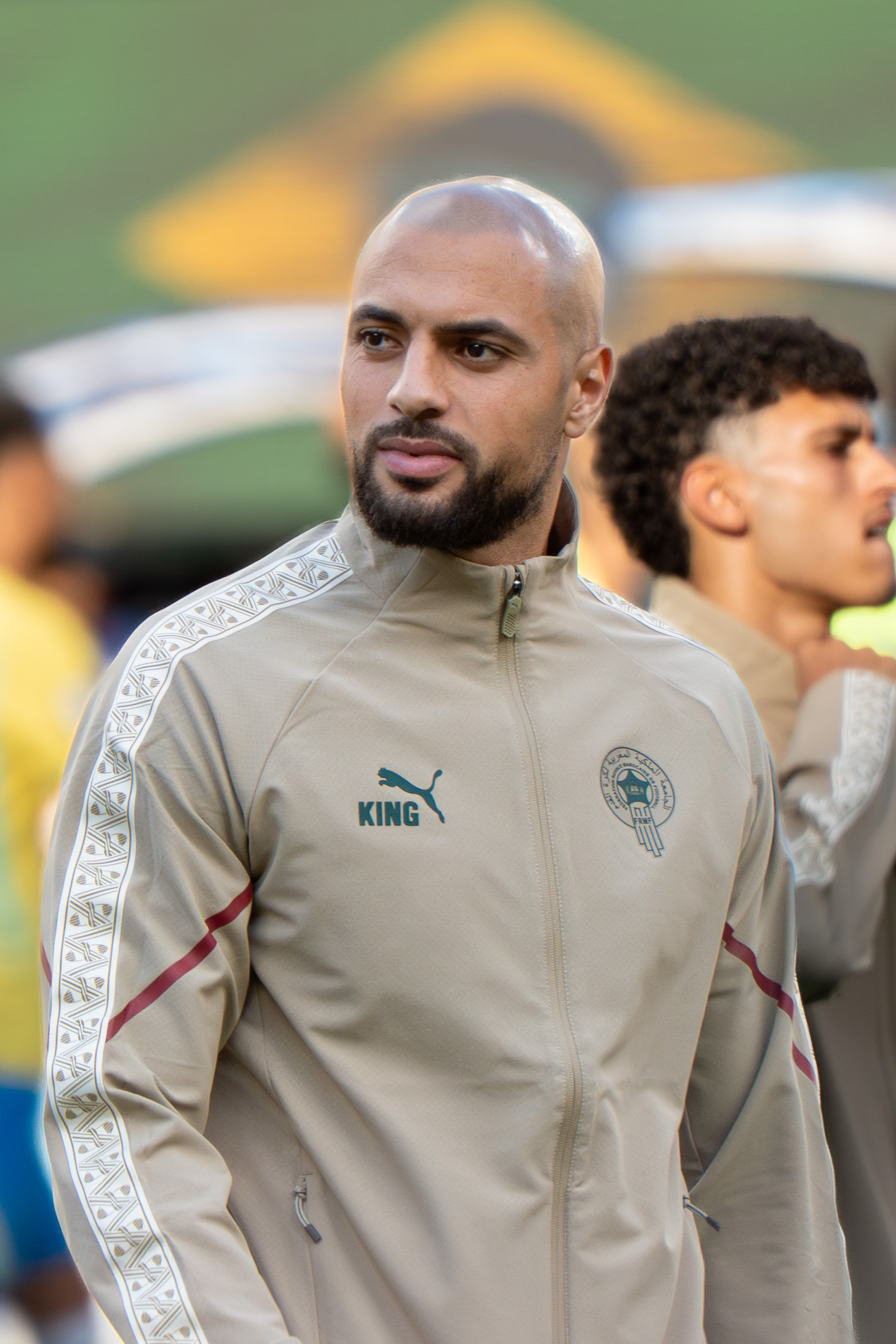
- Amrabat with Morocco in 2026

Personal information
- Full name: Sofyan Amrabat
- Date of birth: 21 August 1996 (age 30)
- Place of birth: Huizen, Netherlands
- Height: 1.85 m (6 ft 1 in)
- Position: Defensive midfielder

Team information
- Current team: Ajax
- Number: 4

Youth career
- –2007: HSV De Zuidvogels
- 2007–2014: Utrecht

Senior career*
Years	Team	Apps	(Gls)
2014–2017	Utrecht	42	(0)
2017–2018	Feyenoord	21	(1)
2018–2020	Club Brugge	25	(1)
2019–2020	→ Hellas Verona (loan)	34	(1)
2020–2025	Fiorentina	85	(1)
2023–2024	→ Manchester United (loan)	21	(0)
2024–2025	→ Fenerbahçe (loan)	26	(2)
2025–2026	Fenerbahçe	2	(0)
2025–2026	→ Betis (loan)	17	(0)
2026–	Ajax	7	(0)

International career^{‡}
2010–2011	Netherlands U15	4	(0)
2013	Morocco U17	3	(0)
2015–2016	Morocco U20	2	(0)
2017–	Morocco	78	(0)
Medal record
Men's football
Representing Morocco
Africa Cup of Nations
Winner	2025 Morocco
- * Club domestic league appearances and goals as of 25 October 2026 ‡ National team caps and goals as of 9 July 2026

Sofyan Amrabat (Arabic: سفيان أمرابط; born 21 August 1996) is a professional footballer who plays as a defensive midfielder for Dutch Eredivisie club Ajax. Born in the Netherlands, he plays for the Morocco national team.

Amrabat is a graduate of Utrecht's youth system. He made his first-team debut for the club in November 2014, and went on to make 54 appearances for them in total, before being signed by Feyenoord in 2017. One year later, he joined Belgian team Club Brugge, who loaned him to Italian club Hellas Verona in August 2019. Verona purchased him and immediately sold him to Fiorentina in January 2020. He joined Manchester United on loan in September 2023, winning the FA Cup.

Amrabat played youth international football for both the Netherlands and Morocco. He made his senior international debut for Morocco in March 2017, and has represented the country at three FIFA World Cups and three Africa Cup of Nations.

== Club career ==
=== Utrecht ===
Amrabat joined Utrecht's youth system in 2007 from HSV De Zuidvogels. He made his first-team debut for Utrecht against Vitesse on 2 November 2014.

=== Feyenoord ===
Amrabat joined Feyenoord in the summer of 2017. He signed a four-year contract and Utrecht received a transfer fee of €4 million.

=== Club Brugge ===
In August 2018, he joined Belgian team Club Brugge on a four-year contract, with Feyenoord receiving €2.5 million. He was sent on loan to Italian club Hellas Verona in August 2019.

=== Hellas Verona ===
In January 2020, Hellas Verona exercised their option to purchase Amrabat from Club Brugge for €3.5 million. They immediately sold him to Fiorentina for a transfer fee of €20 million, with the deal containing potential add-ons of €1.5 million. Amrabat remained on loan at Hellas Verona until the end of the 2019–20 season, as he was not permitted to play for more than two clubs during the season. In July 2020, he won Hellas Verona's Player of the Season award.

=== Fiorentina ===
Amrabat made his debut for Fiorentina in a 4–3 loss to Inter Milan on 26 September 2020. He started and played every minute of Fiorentina's 2–1 defeat to West Ham United in the 2023 UEFA Europa Conference League final.

==== Loan to Manchester United ====
Amrabat joined Manchester United on loan from Fiorentina on 1 September 2023, on a deadline day until the end of the 2023–24 season. Manchester United paid Fiorentina a loan fee of £8.5 million, with the deal containing an option to buy for £21.4 million. On 23 September, he made his Premier League debut, coming off the bench in the 89th minute replacing Jonny Evans, in a 1–0 away win over Burnley. Three days later, Amrabat made his first start for the Red Devils, in a 3–0 victory over Crystal Palace in the Carabao Cup third round at Old Trafford where he played 60 minutes before being replaced by debutant Dan Gore. On 1 November 2023, Amrabat was nominated for the 2023 African Footballer of the Year by the CAF.

Amrabat became the first Moroccan player to win the FA Cup after United beat Manchester City in the 2024 FA Cup final.

=== Fenerbahçe ===
On 30 August 2024, Fenerbahçe announced that they had reached an agreement to sign Amrabat on loan for the 2024–25 season, with an obligation to buy for €12 million after the season. He scored his first goal for the team in an away match against Trabzonspor on the last minute, helping his team achieve a victory. The transfer became permanent on 1 July 2025.

On 1 September 2025, Amrabat was loaned to Real Betis without a buy option, due to Fenerbahçe recently buying the player. On 29 August 2026, his contract with Fenerbahçe was terminated by mutual consent.

=== Ajax ===
On 30 August 2026, Amrabat signed for Eredivisie club Ajax as a free agent on a two-year deal.

== International career ==
=== Netherlands under-15 team ===
Amrabat was eligible to represent the Netherlands or Morocco at international level. At first, he represented the Netherlands, making four appearances at under-15 level.

=== Morocco ===
Amrabat was selected in the Morocco under-17 national team for the 2013 FIFA U-17 World Cup. He made three appearances at the tournament. On 28 March 2017, Amrabat made his senior debut for the Morocco national team in a 1–0 friendly win over Tunisia. In May 2018, he was named in Morocco's 23-man squad for the 2018 FIFA World Cup in Russia. On 10 November 2022, Amrabat was named in Morocco's 26-man squad for the 2022 FIFA World Cup in Qatar. As Morocco clinched 4th place in the tournament, his strong performances led to an increase of interest for his services across Europe. Amrabat appeared for Morocco at the 2023 Africa Cup of Nations where he was sent off in the 83rd minute of the team's 2–0 loss to South Africa in the round of 16.

On 11 December 2025, Amrabat was called up to the Morocco squad for the 2025 Africa Cup of Nations.

On 26 May 2026, Amrabat was selected in the 26-man squad for the 2026 FIFA World Cup.

== Personal life ==
Amrabat was born in Huizen in the Netherlands, to parents of Moroccan-Riffian descent. He is the younger brother of former Morocco international Nordin Amrabat.

== Career statistics ==
=== Club ===
As of match played 25 October 2026

Appearances and goals by club, season and competition
Club	Season	League			National cup (Note: Includes KNVB Cup, Belgian Cup, Coppa Italia, FA Cup, Turkish Cup, Copa del Rey)		League cup (Note: Includes EFL Cup)		Europe		Other		Total	
Club	Season	Division	Apps	Goals	Apps	Goals	Apps	Goals	Apps	Goals	Apps	Goals	Apps	Goals
Utrecht	2014–15	Eredivisie	4	0	0	0	—		—		—		4	0
Utrecht	2015–16	Eredivisie	7	0	1	0	—		—		4 (Note: Appearances in Eredivisie Europa League play-offs)	0	12	0
Utrecht	2016–17	Eredivisie	31	0	4	0	—		—		3	1	38	1
Utrecht	Total		42	0	5	0	—		—		7	1	54	1
Feyenoord	2017–18	Eredivisie	21	1	3	0	—		6 (Note: Appearances in UEFA Champions League)	1	1 (Note: Appearance in Johan Cruyff Shield)	0	31	2
Feyenoord	2018–19	Eredivisie	0	0	—		—		1 (Note: Appearance(s) in UEFA Europa League)	0	1	0	2	0
Feyenoord	Total		21	1	3	0	—		7	1	2	0	33	2
Club Brugge	2018–19	Belgian Pro League	24	1	1	0	—		4 (Note: Two appearances in UEFA Champions League, two appearances in UEFA Europa League)	0	—		29	1
Club Brugge	2019–20	Belgian Pro League	1	0	—		—		0	0	—		1	0
Club Brugge	Total		25	1	1	0	—|		4	0	—		30	1
Hellas Verona (loan)	2019–20	Serie A	34	1	0	0	—		—		—		34	1
Fiorentina	2020–21	Serie A	31	0	2	0	—		—		—		33	0
Fiorentina	2021–22	Serie A	23	1	2	0	—		—		—		25	1
Fiorentina	2022–23	Serie A	29	0	5	0	—		15 (Note: Appearances in UEFA (Europa) Conference League)	0	—		49	0
Fiorentina	2024–25	Serie A	2	0	—		—		2	0	—		4	0
Fiorentina	Total		85	1	9	0	—		17	0	—		111	1
Manchester United (loan)	2023–24	Premier League	21	0	2	0	2	0	5	0	—		30	0
Fenerbahçe (loan)	2024–25	Süper Lig	26	2	3	0	—		10	0	—		39	2
Fenerbahçe	2025–26	Süper Lig	2	0	—		—		4	1	—		6	1
Fenerbahçe	Fenerbahçe total		28	2	3	0	—		14	1	—		45	3
Real Betis (loan)	2025–26	La Liga	17	0	0	0	—		6	1	—		23	1
Ajax	2026–27	Eredivisie	7	0	0	0	—		2	0	—		9	0
Career total			280	6	23	0	2	0	55	3	9	1	369	10

=== International ===
As of match played 9 July 2026

Appearances and goals by national team and year
National team	Year	Apps	Goals
Morocco	2017	2	0
Morocco	2018	6	0
Morocco	2019	6	0
Morocco	2020	4	0
Morocco	2021	9	0
Morocco	2022	19	0
Morocco	2023	4	0
Morocco	2024	12	0
Morocco	2025	10	0
Morocco	2026	6	0
Total		78	0

== Honours ==
Feyenoord

- KNVB Cup: 2017–18
- Johan Cruyff Shield: 2017, 2018

Club Brugge

- Belgian Pro League: 2019–20

Fiorentina

- UEFA Conference League runner-up: 2022–23

Manchester United

- FA Cup: 2023–24

Morocco

- Africa Cup of Nations: 2025

Individual

- Eredivisie Player of the Month: November 2017
- Hellas Verona Player of the Season: 2019–20
- La Gazzetta dello Sport Best African Player in Serie A: 2020
- IFFHS CAF Men's Team of the Year: 2022
- CAF Team of the Year: 2023, 2024

Orders

- Order of the Throne: 2022
