= Aminata Traoré =

Aminata Traoré may refer to:

- Aminata Traoré (author) (born 1947), Malian politician
- Aminata Traoré (taekwondo) (born 1999), Ivorian taekwondo practitioner
