= Salimata Lam =

Mauritanian human rights defender

- Occupation: Coordinator for S.O.S. Esclaves
- Known for: Anti-slavery activism

Salimata Lam is a Mauritanian human rights defender. She is an anti-slavery activist, and national coordinator of the human rights non-governmental organisation S.O.S. Esclaves.

== Biography ==
Lam is the coordinator for S.O.S. Esclaves, a non-governmental organisation founded in 1995 by Mauritanian lawyer Boubacar Ould Messaoud, to tackle the issue of modern slavery. Lam's organisation also advocates against forced marriages. As of August 2015, programs of anti slavery organisations including S.O.S. Esclaves has resulted in the institution of laws in Mauritania that stipulate the increase of prison term for offenders from ten to twenty years as well as criminalizing the act of forced marriages. In a 2015 interview with Al Jazeera however, Lam indicated that despite the presence of the amended laws in the constitution to tackle slavery and forced marriages in Mauritania, "only one slaveholder has been conclusively prosecuted for owning slaves". Since then, other cases have been successfully prosecuted with the assistance of S.O.S. Esclaves.

In 2017, Lam was nominated for the New African Woman in Civil Society Award but lost to Theresa Kachindamoto of Malawi.
