= FIFE Guinea =

Festival International du Film Espoir (FIFE)
- Location: Conakry, Guinea
- Founded: September 2022; 3 years ago
- Awards: Best Film, Best Director, Best Actor
- Language: French, English, Dialect
- Website: Official website

The FIFE (Festival International du Film Espoir) is an annual film festival held across several African countries, in America, and in select European nations. Established in 2022 by Abdoulaye Bamba, the festival aims to promote African films on an international scale while introducing international films to the African continent. It seeks to foster intercultural dialogue through cinema, addressing social and political themes such as human rights, peace, ecology, and the fight against racism.

== History ==
=== First edition (2022) ===
The first edition of FIFE took place in 2022, with screenings in several cities, including Abidjan, Washington, Paris, and Lille. This festival featured films from various continents and highlighted issues such as racial discrimination and social inequalities. The festival was praised for its commitment to showcasing works that reflect contemporary challenges while providing a platform for emerging filmmakers.

=== Expansion and first edition of FIFE Guinea (2023) ===
In 2023, the FIFE expanded its reach by including new African cities such as Bamako and Conakry, marking the beginning of the festival's first edition in Guinea. This event strengthened the festival's presence across the continent by showcasing films that address strong social and political themes. FIFE Guinea played a key role in bringing together committed filmmakers and an audience eager to explore socially relevant works, thereby solidifying the festival's reputation as a must-attend event for impactful cinema.

== Objectives and vision ==
FIFE Guinea mission is to promote cinema that not only entertains, but also educates and raises awareness. By highlighting works that address diverse themes such as human rights, social justice, and environmental preservation, the festival aims to be a catalyst for change through the cinematic arts.

== Awards ==
Among the awards given at FIFE Guinea, the following are notable:

- Best Film
- Best Director
- Best Actor

These awards are intended to encourage and recognize talents who use cinema as a tool for reflection and social transformation.
