= Lamine Traoré =

Lamine Traoré is the name of:

- Lamine Traoré (footballer, born 1982), Burkinabé footballer
- Lamine Traoré (footballer, born 1991), Guinean footballer
- Lamine Traoré (footballer, born 1993), Malian footballer
