= Moussa Traoré (disambiguation) =

Moussa Traoré (1936–2020) was the 2nd President of Mali.

Moussa Traoré may also refer to:

- Moussa Traoré (footballer, born 1952) (died 2003), association football player from the 1972 African Cup of Nations squad for Mali
- Moussa Traoré (footballer, born 1971), association football player from Ivory Coast
- Moussa Traoré (footballer, born 1990), Ivorian-Burkinabé association football player
- Moussa Traoré (footballer, born 1995), Guinean footballer who plays as goalkeeper
