= Togba Traoré =

Guinean politician

Deputy in the National Assembly (Guinea), President of the Commission of Economic and Financial Affairs, of the Budget and of Cooperation
- President: Alpha Conde
- Preceded by: Jeanne Lolamou
- Constituency: Lola

Personal details
- Party: Rally of the Guinean People

Togba Traoré is a Guinean politician who represents the constituency of Lola, in the National Assembly. He is a member of the majority Rally of the Guinean People of former president Alpha Conde.
