= Alan Empereur =

Brazilian footballer (born 1994)

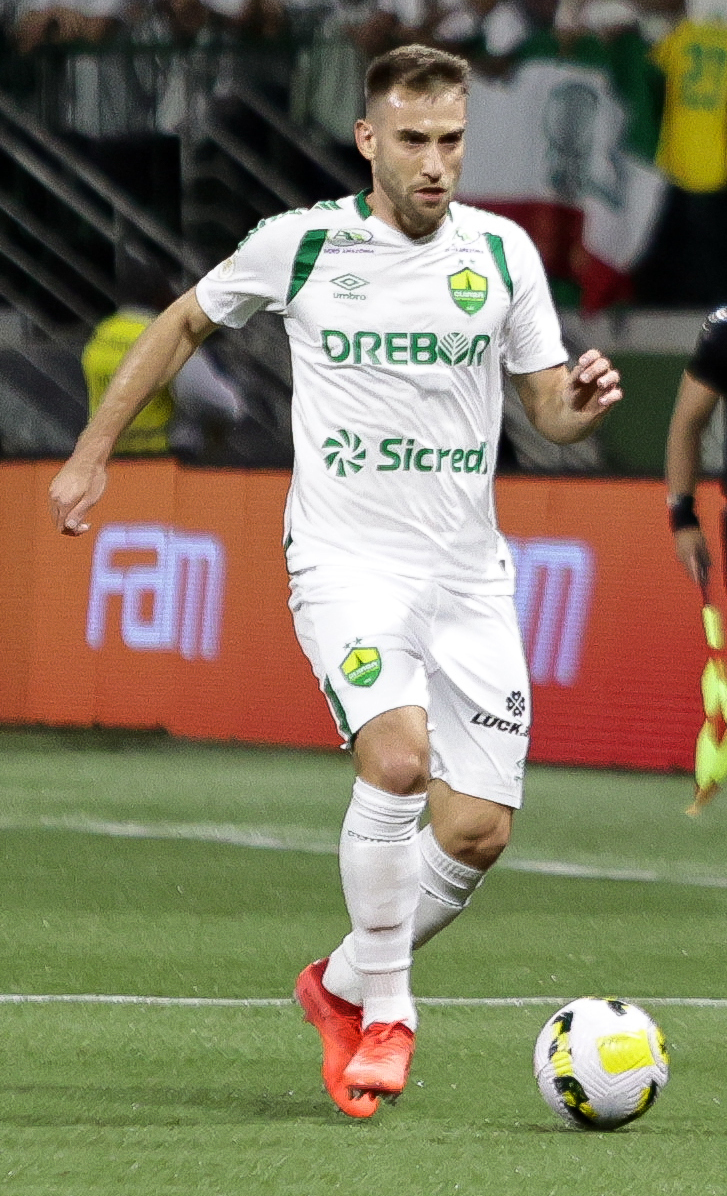

Personal information
- Full name: Alan Pereira Empereur
- Date of birth: 10 March 1994 (age 32)
- Place of birth: Ipatinga, Brazil
- Height: 1.86 m (6 ft 1 in)
- Position: Defender

Team information
- Current team: Cuiabá
- Number: 33

Youth career
- –2008: Atlético Mineiro
- 2008–2014: Fiorentina

Senior career*
Years	Team	Apps	(Gls)
2014–2015	Fiorentina	0	(0)
2014–2015	→ Ischia (loan)	17	(0)
2015	→ Livorno (loan)	1	(0)
2015	Teramo	0	(0)
2015–2016	Salernitana	32	(0)
2016–2018	Foggia	20	(0)
2018	→ Bari (loan)	8	(0)
2018–2021	Hellas Verona	39	(1)
2020–2021	→ Palmeiras (loan)	16	(0)
2021–	Cuiabá	159	(3)
2025	→ Mirassol (loan)	8	(0)
- * Club domestic league appearances and goals as of 18 November 2026

Alan Pereira Empereur (born 10 March 1994) is a Brazilian professional footballer who plays as a defender for Cuiabá. He also holds Italian citizenship.

== Playing career ==
=== Early career ===
Empereur played for local clubs Associação Esportiva e Recreativa Usipa and Associação Atlética Aciaria. From there, he made the move to Atlético Mineiro's youth academy, where he played in the youth leagues and various cups. During a tournament in São Paulo in January 2007, he caught the attention of an agent, Camilo Abranches, who offered to take him to Italy to join the Fiorentina youth team. His Italian ancestry, through his paternal grandfather, allowed him to easily secure an Italian passport, facilitating the transition.

At Fiorentina, he passed through the U15 and U17 squads before graduating to the Primavera (U19) team in 2010, where he made 59 league appearances in four seasons. He eventually rose to the position of captain, and regularly trained with the first team.

=== Club career ===
In January 2014, it was reported that negotiations were underway to send Empereur to Teramo on a loan. He said his goodbyes and thanked the city through his Facebook account on January 20. However, negotiations continued for over a week, and on 1 February, the day of the transfer deadline, it was reported that the deal had fallen through.

Empereur was loaned to Ischia in the third-tier Lega Pro in August. He made his debut on August 31, playing the full 90 minutes in a 1–0 loss to Benevento. Ischia finished near the bottom of the table in his only season there, but Empereur was seen as one of the team's lone bright spots that year.

On his return to Fiorentina in February 2015, he was loaned to the Serie B team Livorno for five months, although he spent most of his time with Amaranto on the bench. His only appearance for the club was on February 7, when he came on for Giuseppe Gemiti in a 5–2 win against Bari.

In July 2017, Empereur signed a three-year deal with Teramo. However, less than two months later, Empereur and his new team mutually agreed to separate. His only appearance with the team was on August 9, when he played the full 90 minutes of a Coppa Italia match against Cittadella.

He joined Salernitana on a three-year contract in August; he made his debut on 26 September against Ternana, coming on to replace Andrea Bovo.

In July 2016, Empereur signed a three-year contract with Foggia.

On 17 August 2018, Empereur signed with the Serie B side Hellas Verona. He scored his first professional goal during a league fixture against Perugia on May 18, 2019.

On 9 November 2020, Empereur returned to his native Brazil and signed a loan deal with Palmeiras until June 2021 with the option to buy. On 11 November, he made his debut for Palmeiras against Ceará during a quarter-final's fixture in Copa do Brasil.

== Honours ==
Palmeiras

- Copa do Brasil: 2020
- Copa Libertadores: 2020
- Recopa Sudamericana runner-up: 2021

Cuiabá

- Campeonato Mato-Grossense: 2022
