= WatsUp TV Africa Music Video Awards =

- Awarded for: African Music Videos
- Presented by: WatsUp TV
- First award: 2016
- Website: WatsUp TV Africa Music Video Awards

WatsUp TV Africa Music Video Awards (commonly abbreviated as a WAMVA) is an award presented by the TV channel WatsUp TV to honor the best in the African music videos scene.

The award was launched in Accra, Ghana in September 2016 coupled with the announcement of Nominees across 20 categories.

WAMVA will be honoring Anglophone and the Francophone artists from the Africa music video medium.

On 28 December, winners of the maiden edition were announced in Accra ahead of a Made in Africa concert to be hosted in 2017 which will feature all winners.

== 2016 ==
- Venue: Paparazzi- Lizzy Sports Complex, Accra
- Hosts: Gladys Wiredu & Prince Akpah

Winners

- African Video of the Year - Diamond Platnumz ft P-Square - Kidogo - Tanzania
- Best African Video Director - Godfather - Kidogo – Nigeria
- WAMVA Special Recognition Award - Mr Eazi ft Efya – Skin Tight - Nigeria
- WatsUp TV Viewers Choice Awards - Desiigner – Panda - United States
- Best African Newcomer Video - Harmonize ft Diamond Platnumz - BADO - Tanzania
- Best African Reggae/Dancehall Video - Shatta Wale - Chopkiss - Ghana
- Best International Video - Beyoncé - Formation - United States
- Best Afro Pop Video - Scientific ft Quincy B - Rotate - Liberia
- Best African Hip Hop Video - Iba One - Dokèra - Mali
- Best African Rnb Video - Ali Kiba - Aje - Tanzania
- Best African Traditional Video - Tay Grin ft 2baba - Chipapapa - Malawi
- Best African Performance - DJ Arafat - Concert a Korhogo - Côte d'Ivoire
- Best African Dance Video - Oudy 1er - Lokolo - Guinea
- Best African Combo Video - Diamond Platnumz ft AKA (rapper) - Make Me Sing - Tanzania
- Best African Male Video - Diamond Platnumz ft P-Square - Kidogo - Tanzania
- Best African Female Video - Vivian Chidid - Wuyuma - Senegal
- Best East African Video - Ali Kiba - Aje - Tanzania
- Best Central African Video - Ferré Gola ft Victoria Kimani - Tucheze - DR Congo
- Best North African Video - Ibtissam Tiskat - Ma Fi Mn Habibi - Morocco
- Best South African Video - Cassper Nyovest - War Ready - South Africa
- Best West African Video - DJ Arafat - Maplôrly - Côte d'Ivoire
- Best African Group Video - Navy Kenzo - Kamatia – Tanzania
