= Salimata Traoré =

Malian politician

Salimata Traoré (born 1994) is a politician and member of the national assembly in Mali.

== See also ==
- Politics of Mali
