= Iya Traoré =

Guinean footballer and freestyler

Iya Traore
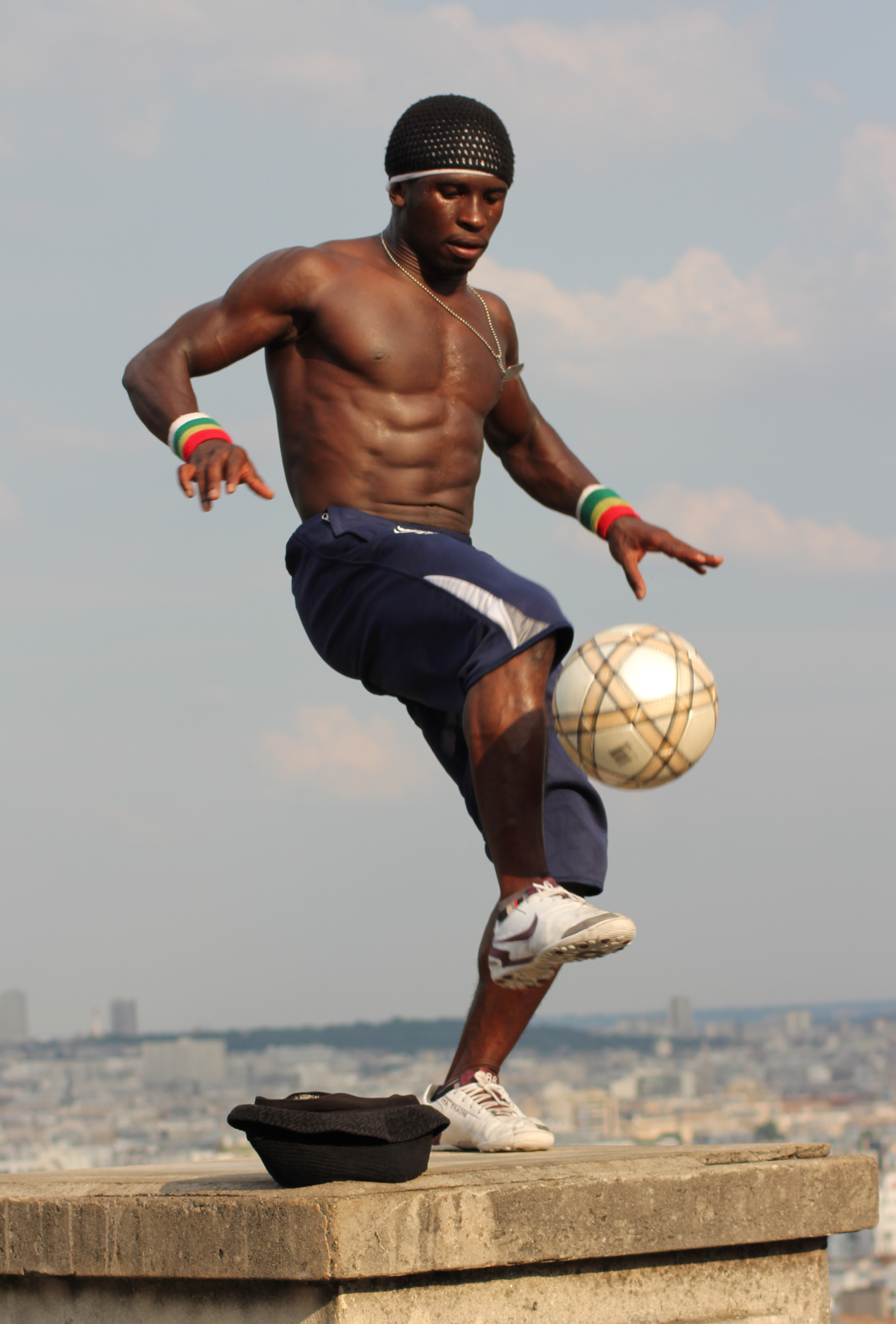
- Traoré in 2010

Personal information
- Born: Kebeya, Guinea
- Occupations: Football player; football freestyler
- Years active: 2002
- Other interests: Music; dance
- Website: iya.fr/en/

Iya Traoré (born 1986) is a Guinean freestyler and former footballer who has been featured in the Guinness World Records three times. He currently resides in Paris and is featured on various TV programs, including reality shows, music videos, and commercials.

== Early and personal life ==
Traore started as a local goalkeeper in his village, Kebeya, Republic of Guinea. Following his father's return from Europe, Traore relocated to Conakry to pursue his studies and joined the football club Ibrahim FC, where his team went on to win several local trophies.

== Football career ==
In 2000, Traore arrived in Paris, where he played for football clubs such as ESP, Paris FC, Paris Saint Germain. However, he was never offered a professional contract. During this time, he also assisted his father, an African art merchant.

== Freestyle career ==
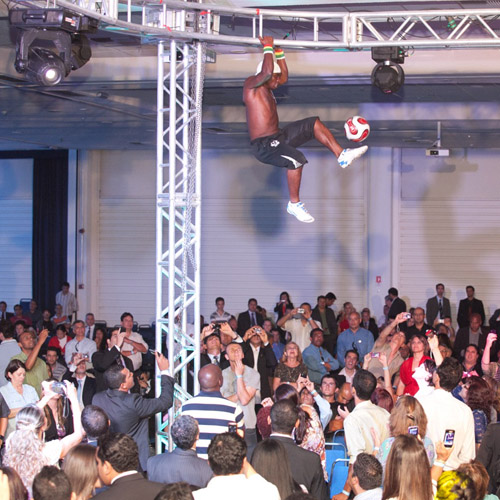
Iya Performing before a crowd

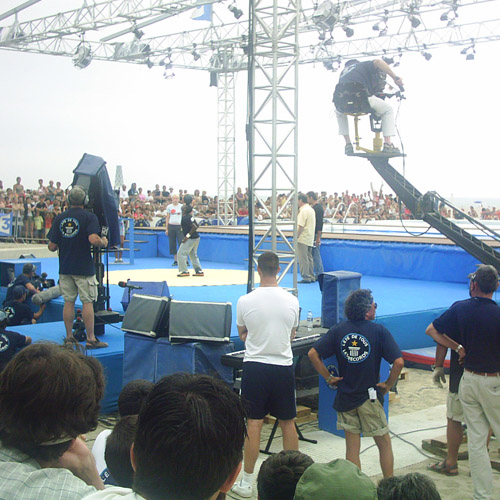
Iya Performing during the recording of Guinness World Records 2004

On July 20, 2011, Traoré achieved a Guinness World Records in Beijing, China, where he ascended 75 steps backward on a fire brigade ladder while managing a football with his feet. The ladder, set at an inclination of 55 degrees and measuring 25 meters in length, concluded at a height of 21.5 meters from the ground.

Traore's work has challenged conventional views of freestyle on the global stage, leading to documentary opportunities and awards worldwide. He appeared in Shakira's "La La La" video in 2014, for the World Cup in Brazil. He has performed in over 40 countries, spanning China, France, Ghana, Egypt, Morocco, Italy, the US, Brazil and more.
