= Abdoullaye Traoré =

Ivorian-born Italian footballer (born 2000)

Abdoulaye Traoré
Personal information
- Date of birth: 30 April 2000 (age 26)
- Place of birth: Abidjan, Ivory Coast
- Height: 1.75 m (5 ft 9 in)
- Position: Forward

Youth career
- –2016: Inter

Senior career*
Years	Team	Apps	(Gls)
2016–2018	Perugia	2	(0)
2018–2020	Hellas Verona	2	(0)
2019–2020	→ Rende (loan)	4	(0)
2020	Sharjah	0	(0)
- * Club domestic league appearances and goals as of 12 January 2020

Abdoulaye Traoré (born 30 April 2000) is an Italian football player of Ivorian descent.

== Club career ==
=== Perugia ===
He made his professional debut in the Serie B for Perugia on 20 September 2016 in a game against Virtus Entella.

=== Hellas Verona ===
On 28 July 2018, Traorè signed with Hellas Verona for free.

==== Loan to Rende ====
On 2 September 2019, he moved to Serie C club Rende on loan.

=== Al-Sharjah ===
On 3 February 2020, Sharjah has signed Traoré from Hellas Verona.
