= Ghana women's national football team results =

The Ghana women's national football team represents Ghana in women's association football and is administered by the Ghana Football Association (GFA); the association is affiliated to the Confederation of African Football (CAF). Football has been played in the country since 1903, organised by the national association since 8 September 1957. In 1991, the Black Queens were "hurriedly assembled" ahead of their first official match during the qualifying rounds for the 1991 FIFA Women's World Cup, a 5–1 defeat against Nigeria on 16 February 1991 — the first women's association football match on African ground.

The team's largest victories came on 29 March 1998 and 11 July 2004 when they defeated Guinea by 11–0 and 13–0, respectively. Their worst loss is 11–0 against Germany on 22 July 2016. Between 1991 and 2020, Ghana played 140 international matches, resulting in 76 victories, 28 draws and 36 defeats.

== Results ==
=== 1991 ===
16 February 1991 African Championship	Nigeria	5–1	Ghana	Lagos, Nigeria
				Stadium: Lagos National Stadium

3 March 1991 African Championship	Ghana	1–2	Nigeria	(Ghana) Accra
	Baidu		Igunbor (0–1); Uche (0–2)	Stadium: Accra Sports Stadium

=== 1995 ===
9 January 1995 African Championship	Ghana	0–3	Nigeria	(Ghana) Accra
				Stadium: Accra Sports Stadium

23 January 1995 African Championship	Nigeria	2–0	Ghana	Lagos, Nigeria
				Stadium: Lagos National Stadium

=== 1998 ===
29 March 1998 African Championship Q	Ghana	11–0	Guinea	(Ghana) Accra
	Gyamfuah 4', 22', 35', 90'; Mensah 17', 24' (1st hf. (6–0)); Bayor (1st hf. (7–0)); Sackey 73', 80'; Quartey 78'	Report		Stadium: Accra Sports Stadium

12 April 1998 African Championship Q	Guinea	0–8	Ghana	Conakry, Guinea
				Stadium: Stade du 28 Septembre

5 July 1998 International Friendly	Ghana	1–1	Nigeria	Accra, Ghana
		Report		Stadium: Accra Sports Stadium

ca. 26 September 1998 Friendly	Egypt	1–3	Ghana	Cairo, Egypt
				Stadium: Cairo International Stadium

10 October 1998 Friendly	Ghana	4–0	Egypt	(Ghana) Accra
	Sackey 42'; Mensah 61'; Bayor 70'; Shalaby 89' (o.g.)	Report		Stadium: Accra Sports Stadium

18 October 1998 African Championship	Ghana	4–0	South Africa	Ijebu Ode, Nigeria
		Report		Stadium: Gateway Stadium

24 October 1998 African Championship	Ghana	3–1	Cameroon	Ijebu Ode, Nigeria
				Stadium: Gateway Stadium

27 October 1998 African Championship	Ghana	4–1 (a.e.t.)	DR Congo	Ijebu Ode, Nigeria
	Gyamfuah 7'; Sackey 96'; Mensah 108' (a.e.t. (4–1))	Report	unknown	Stadium: Gateway Stadium

31 October 1998 African Championship Final	Nigeria	2–0	Ghana	Ijebu Ode, Nigeria
	Okosieme 43'; Mbachu 64'	Report		Stadium: Gateway Stadium

=== 1999 ===
6 March 1999 Friendly	China	2–1	Ghana	Beijing, China

9 March 1999 Friendly	China	2–1	Ghana	Beijing, China

15 May 1999 Friendly	Nigeria	2–1	Ghana	Lagos, Nigeria
	Mercy Akide		Mensah	Stadium: Lagos National Stadium

20 June 1999 World Cup	Australia	1–1	Ghana	Foxborough, United States
	Murray 74'	(Report)	Gyamfuah 76'	Stadium: Foxboro Stadium; Attendance: 14,873; Referee: Kari Seitz (United States)

23 June 1999 World Cup	China	7–0	Ghana	Portland, United States
	Sun 9', 21', 54'; Jin 16'; Zhang 82', 90+1'; Zhao 90+2'	(Report)		Stadium: Civic Stadium; Attendance: 17,668; Referee: Elke Günthner (Germany)

26 June 1999 World Cup	Ghana	0–2	Sweden	Chicago, United States
		(Report)	Svensson 58', 86'	Stadium: Soldier Field; Attendance: 34,256; Referee: Sonia Denoncourt (Canada)

=== 2000 ===
12 November 2000 African Championship	Nigeria	2–2	Ghana	Tembisa, South Africa
	Akide 40' (pen.), 50'	(Report)	Baidu 52'; Okine 80'	Stadium: Makhulong Stadium; Referee: Fatou Gaye (Senegal)

15 November 2000 African Championship	Ghana	2–0	Cameroon	Tembisa, South Africa
	Sackey 7'; Djangmah 82'	(Report)		Stadium: Makhulong Stadium; Referee: Justine Rasonirina (Madagascar)

18 November 2000 African Championship	Ghana	3–0	Morocco	Tembisa, South Africa
	Baidu 65'; Bayor 66'; Gyamfuah 70'	(Report)		Stadium: Makhulong Stadium; Referee: Sabelo Sibindi (Zimbabwe)

21 November 2000 African Championship	South Africa	1–0	Ghana	Vosloorus, South Africa
	Solomon 9'	(Report)		Stadium: Vosloorus Stadium; Referee: Fatou Gaye (Senegal)

24 November 2000 African Championship	Ghana	6–3	Zimbabwe	Vosloorus, South Africa
	Baidu 1'; Bayor 6', 31'; Darku 24'; Oforiwaa 35'; Djangmah 44'	(Report)	Mpala 14'; Moyo 16'; Nyerukai 61'	Stadium: Vosloorus Stadium; Referee: Justine Rasoanirina (Madagascar)

=== 2002 ===
22 September 2002 African Championship Q	Senegal	0–3	Ghana	Dakar, Senegal
		(Report)	Amoah-Tetteh 24', 56'; Darku 29'	Stadium: Stade Iba-Mar-Diop; Referee: Xonam Agboyi (Togo)

12 October 2002 African Championship Q	Ghana	3–1	Senegal	(Ghana) Kumasi
	Okine 30'; Ohenewaa 51', 67'	(Report)	Gueye 81'	Stadium: Kumasi Sports Stadium; Referee: Bola Abidoye (Nigeria)

7 December 2002 African Championship	Mali	0–2	Ghana	Warri, Nigeria

10 December 2002 African Championship	Nigeria	0–1	Ghana	Warri, Nigeria

13 December 2002 African Championship	Ghana	3–0	Ethiopia	Oghara, Nigeria

17 December 2002 African Championship	Ghana	3–2 (a.e.t.)	Cameroon	Warri, Nigeria

20 December 2002 African Championship Final	Ghana	0–2	Nigeria	Warri, Nigeria

=== 2003 ===
16 August 2003 Friendly	Canada	1–1	Ghana	Seattle, United States

21 September 2003 World Cup	China	1–0	Ghana	Carson, United States
	Sun 29'	(Report)		Stadium: Home Depot Center, Carson; Attendance: 10,027; Referee: Sonia Denoncourt (Canada)

25 September 2003 World Cup	Ghana	0–3	Russia	Carson, United States
		(Report)	Saenko 36'; Barbashina 54'; Letyushova 80'	Stadium: Home Depot Center, Carson; Attendance: 13,929; Referee: Kari Seitz (United States)

28 September 2003 World Cup	Ghana	2–1	Australia	Portland, United States
	Sackey 34', 39'	(Report)	Garriock 61'	Stadium: PGE Park, Portland; Attendance: 19,132; Referee: Xonam Agboyi (Togo)

26 October 2003 Olympic Games Q	Ghana	2–0	DR Congo	(Ghana) Kumasi

9 November 2003 Olympic Games Q	DR Congo	1–2	Ghana	(Democratic Republic of the Congo) Kinshasa, DR Congo

=== 2004 ===
14 February 2004 Olympic Games Q	Ghana	1–1 (a.e.t.) (2–3 p)	Nigeria	(Ghana) Accra

11 July 2004 African Championship Q	Guinea	0–13	Ghana	Conakry, Guinea

24 July 2004 African Championship Q	Ghana	9–0	Guinea	(Ghana) Accra

18 September 2004 African Championship	South Africa	0–3	Ghana	Pretoria, South Africa

21 September 2004 African Championship	Ghana	2–1	Ethiopia	Johannesburg, South Africa

24 September 2004 African Championship	Ghana	2–0	Zimbabwe	Johannesburg, South Africa

28 September 2004 African Championship	Ghana	0–1 (a.e.t.)	Cameroon	Johannesburg, South Africa

2 October 2004 African Championship	Ghana	0–0 (a.e.t.) (6–5 p)	Ethiopia	Johannesburg, South Africa

=== 2006 ===
29 October 2006 African Championship	Mali	0–1	Ghana	Oghara, Nigeria

1 November 2006 African Championship	Ghana	2–1	Cameroon	Ughelli, Nigeria

4 November 2006 African Championship	DR Congo	1–3	Ghana	Ughelli, Nigeria

7 November 2006 African Championship	Ghana	1–0	South Africa	Oghara, Nigeria

11 November 2006 African Championship Final	Nigeria	1–0	Ghana	Warri, Nigeria

=== 2007 ===
17 February 2007 Olympic Games Q	Angola	1–2	Ghana	Luanda, Angola

11 March 2007 Olympic Games Q	Ghana	2–0	Angola	(Ghana) Sunyani

3 June 2007 Olympic Games Q	Ghana	3–1	DR Congo	(Ghana) Sunyani

17 June 2007 Olympic Games Q	DR Congo	0–1	Ghana	(Democratic Republic of the Congo) Kinshasa, DR Congo

29 July 2007 Olympic Games Q	Ethiopia	1–3	Ghana	Addis Ababa, Ethiopia

12 August 2007 Olympic Games Q	Ghana	1–0	Nigeria	(Ghana) Accra

25 August 2007 Olympic Games Q	South Africa	1–0	Ghana	Pretoria, South Africa

12 September 2007 World Cup	Australia	4–1	Ghana	Hangzhou, China
	Walsh 15'; De Vanna 57', 81'; Garriock 69'	(Report)	Amankwah 70'	Stadium: Yellow Dragon Stadium; Attendance: 30,752; Referee: Adriana Correa (Colombia)

15 September 2007 World Cup	Canada	4–0	Ghana	Hangzhou, China
	Sinclair 16', 62'; Schmidt 55'; Franko 77'	(Report)		Stadium: Yellow Dragon Stadium; Attendance: 33,835; Referee: Nicole Petignat (Switzerland)

20 September 2007 World Cup	Norway	7–2	Ghana	Hangzhou, China
	Storløkken 4'; R. Gulbrandsen 39', 59', 62'; Horpestad 45' (pen.); Herlovsen 56'; Klaveness 69'	(Report)	Bayor 73'; Okoe 80' (pen.)	Stadium: Yellow Dragon Stadium; Attendance: 43,817; Referee: Jennifer Bennet (United States)

9 December 2007 Olympic Games Q	Ghana	2–1	South Africa	(Ghana) Accra

=== 2008 ===
23 February 2008 African Championship Q	Ivory Coast	1–1	Ghana	Abidjan, Ivory Coast

8 March 2008 African Championship Q	Ghana	3–0	Ivory Coast	(Ghana) Accra

25 March 2008 Olympic Games Q	Nigeria	2–0	Ghana	Abuja, Nigeria

19 April 2008 Olympic Games Q	Brazil	5–1	Ghana	Beijing, China

16 November 2008 African Championship	Nigeria	1–1	Ghana	Bata, Equatorial Guinea

19 November 2008 African Championship	Ghana	0–1	South Africa	Bata, Equatorial Guinea

22 November 2008 African Championship	Ghana	3–2	Tunisia	Malabo, Equatorial Guinea

=== 2010 ===
22 May 2010 African Championship Q	Senegal	0–1	Ghana	Dakar, Senegal

6 June 2010 African Championship Q	Ghana	3–0	Senegal	(Ghana) Accra

2 November 2010 African Championship	Algeria	1–2	Ghana	Daveyton, South Africa

5 November 2010 African Championship	Ghana	1–2	Cameroon	Daveyton, South Africa

8 November 2010 African Championship	Ghana	1–3	Equatorial Guinea	Daveyton, South Africa

=== 2011 ===
16 January 2011 Olympic Games Q	Guinea	0–2	Ghana	Conakry, Guinea

29 January 2011 Olympic Games Q	Ghana	5–1	Guinea	(Ghana) Accra

21 March 2011 Friendly	Ghana	0–0	Cameroon	(Ghana) Accra

3 April 2011 Olympic Games Q	Ethiopia	1–0	Ghana	Addis Ababa, Ethiopia

16 April 2011 Olympic Games Q	Ghana	2–1	Ethiopia	(Ghana) Accra

=== 2012 ===
15 January 2012 African Championship Q	Mali	0–3	Ghana	Bamako, Mali

29 January 2012 African Championship Q	Ghana	5–0	Mali	(Ghana) Accra

21 March 2012 Friendly	South Africa	1–1 (5–4 p)	Ghana	Johannesburg, South Africa

26 May 2012 African Championship Q	Ghana	1–1	Cameroon	(Ghana) Accra

9 June 2012 Friendly	Ethiopia	0–0	Ghana	Addis Ababa, Ethiopia

17 June 2012 African Championship Q	Cameroon	1–1 (a.e.t.) (9–8 p)	Ghana	Yaoundé, Cameroon

=== 2014 ===
16 February 2014 African Championship Q	Burkina Faso	0–3	Ghana	Ouagadougou, Burkina Faso

1 March 2014 African Championship Q	Ghana	3–0	Burkina Faso	(Ghana) Accra

21 March 2014 Friendly	Namibia	1–3	Ghana	Windhoek, Namibia

25 March 2014 Friendly	Namibia	0–3	Ghana	Windhoek, Namibia

18 May 2014 Friendly	South Africa	0–1	Ghana	Soweto, South Africa

25 May 2014 African Championship Q	Ethiopia	0–2	Ghana	Addis Ababa, Ethiopia

8 June 2014 African Championship Q	Ghana	3–0	Ethiopia	(Ghana) Tamale

13 September 2014 Friendly	Japan	5–0	Ghana	Tendō, Japan

12 October 2014 African Championship	Algeria	1–0	Ghana	Windhoek, Namibia

15 October 2014 African Championship	Ghana	1–1	South Africa	Windhoek, Namibia

18 October 2014 African Championship	Cameroon	0–1	Ghana	Windhoek, Namibia

=== 2015 ===
21 March 2015 African Games Q	Ghana	2–1	Zimbabwe	(Ghana) Accra

12 April 2015 African Games Q	Zimbabwe	2–2	Ghana	Harare, Zimbabwe

23 May 2015 Olympic Games Q	Egypt	1–1	Ghana	New Cairo, Egypt

31 May 2015 Olympic Games Q	Ghana	3–0	Egypt	(Ghana) Accra

18 July 2015 Olympic Games Q	Cameroon	1–1	Ghana	Yaoundé, Cameroon

1 August 2015 Olympic Games Q	Ghana	2–2	Cameroon	(Ghana) Accra

10 September 2015 African Games	South Africa	0–0	Ghana	(Republic of the Congo) Brazzaville, Congo Rep.
		(Report)		Stadium: Stade Municipal de Kintélé; Referee: Chancelle Ngakosso (Congo)

13 September 2015 African Games	Cameroon	1–1	Ghana	(Republic of the Congo) Brazzaville, Congo Rep.
	Akaba 54'	(Report)	Kobblah 32'	Stadium: Stade Kintélé 3 Referee: Aissatou Keita (Guinea)

15 September 2015 African Games	Ivory Coast	0–1	Ghana	(Republic of the Congo) Brazzaville, Congo Rep.
		(Report)	Suleman 15'	Stadium: Stade Kintélé 3 Referee: Salma Mukansanga (Rwanda)

18 September 2015 African Games Final	Ghana	1–0	Cameroon	(Republic of the Congo) Brazzaville, Congo Rep.
	Boakye 88'	(Report)		Stadium: Stade Alphonse Massemba-Débat; Referee: Marximina Bernardo (Angola)

=== 2016 ===
6 April 2016 Africa Cup of Nations Q	Tunisia	1–2	Ghana	Oued Ellil, Tunisia
	Kabaache 33' (pen.)	(Report 1) (Report 2)	Suleman 49'; P. Adobea 84'; Mantey (red card) 60'	Stadium: Stade Municipal d'Oued Ellil; Referee: Fadouma Dia (Senegal)

12 April 2016 Africa Cup of Nations Q	Ghana	4–0	Tunisia	(Ghana) Accra
	Suleman 26', 89'; Boakye 32'; P. Adobea 80'	(Report)		Stadium: Accra Sports Stadium; Referee: Chancelle Ngakosso (Congo)

22 July 2016 Friendly	Germany	11–0	Ghana	Paderborn, Germany
	Mittag 1', 31', 39', 42'; Marozsán 6', 90+1'; Popp 13'; C. Adobea 27' (o.g.); Bartusiak 29'; Däbritz 30'; Islacker 66'	(Report)		Stadium: Benteler-Arena; Attendance: 6,243; Referee: Lina Lehtovaara (Finland)

20 November 2016 Africa Cup of Nations	Ghana	3–1	Kenya	Limbe, Cameroon
	Suleman 49'; Addo 71'; Boakye 90'	(Report)	Akida 23'	Stadium: Limbe Stadium; Referee: Jeanne Ekoumou (Cameroon)

23 November 2016 Africa Cup of Nations	Nigeria	1–1	Ghana	Limbe, Cameroon
	Oshoala 19'	(Report)	Addo 43' (pen.)	Stadium: Limbe Stadium; Referee: Akhona Makalima (South Africa)

26 November 2016 Africa Cup of Nations	Mali	1–3	Ghana	Yaoundé, Cameroon
	Diarra 87'	(Report)	Eshun 44'; Suleman 68'; Addo 79' (pen.)	Stadium: Stade Ahmadou Ahidjo; Referee: Maria Rivet (Mauritius)

29 November 2016 Africa Cup of Nations	Cameroon	1–0	Ghana	Yaoundé, Cameroon
	Feudjio 72'	(Report)		Stadium: Stade Ahmadou Ahidjo; Referee: Gladys Lengwe (Zambia)

2 December 2016 Africa Cup of Nations	Ghana	1–0	South Africa	Yaoundé, Cameroon
	Eshun 48'	(Report)		Stadium: Stade Ahmadou Ahidjo; Referee: Jonesia Kabakama (Tanzania)

=== 2017 ===
23 October 2017 Friendly	France	8–0	Ghana	Reims, France
	Sarr 37'; Henry 46', 52' (pen.); Asseyi 58', 76'; Le Sommer 68', 70'; Gauvin 83'	(Report 1) (Report 2)		Stadium: Stade Auguste Delaune; Attendance: 16,982; Referee: Monika Mularczyk (Poland)

=== 2018 ===
14 February 2018 WAFU Cup	Ivory Coast	1–0	Ghana	Abidjan, Ivory Coast

16 February 2018 WAFU Cup	Ghana	9–0	Niger	Abidjan, Ivory Coast

18 February 2018 WAFU Cup	Ghana	4–1	Burkina Faso	Abidjan, Ivory Coast

22 February 2018 WAFU Cup	Nigeria	1–1 (a.e.t.) (4–5 p)	Ghana	Abidjan, Ivory Coast

24 February 2018 WAFU Cup Final	Ivory Coast	0–1	Ghana	Abidjan, Ivory Coast

1 April 2018 Friendly	Japan	7–1	Ghana	Isahaya, Japan

3 November 2018 Friendly	Zambia	3–2	Ghana	Lusaka, Zambia
	Kundananji 65', 75', 87'		Boakye 21'; Addo 33'	Stadium: Nkoloma Stadium

7 November 2018 Friendly	Kenya	1–1	Ghana	Nairobi, Kenya
	Achieng 14'		Eshun 74'	Stadium: Moi International Sports Centre

11 November 2018 Friendly	Ghana	1–0	South Africa	Accra, Ghana
	Suleman 21'			Stadium: Accra Sports Stadium

17 November 2018 2018 Africa Women Cup of Nations	Ghana	1–0	Algeria	Accra, Ghana
	Amfobea 21'	(Report)		Stadium: Accra Sports Stadium; Referee: Lidya Tafesse (Ethiopia)

20 November 2018 2018 Africa Women Cup of Nations	Ghana	1–2	Mali	Accra, Ghana
	Addo 71' (pen.)	(Report)	Touré 24' (pen.), 75'	Stadium: Accra Sports Stadium; Referee: Letticia Antonella Viana (Eswatini)

23 November 2018 2018 Africa Women Cup of Nations	Cameroon	1–1	Ghana	Accra, Ghana
	Manie 41' (pen.)	(Report)	Boakye 31'	Stadium: Accra Sports Stadium; Referee: Maria Rivet (Mauritius)

=== 2019 ===
8 May 2019 WAFU Cup	Senegal	0–2	Ghana	Abidjan, Ivory Coast
		Report	Badu (0–1); Abdulai (0–2)	Stadium: Stade Robert Champroux

10 May 2019 WAFU Cup	Togo	0–6	Ghana	Abidjan, Ivory Coast
		Report	Abdulai (0–1); Kusi 0', 0'; Asantewaa (0–4); Owusu 0', 0'	Stadium: Parc des Sports de Treichville

13 May 2019 WAFU Cup	Ivory Coast	0–0	Ghana	Abidjan, Ivory Coast
		Report		Stadium: Stade Robert Champroux

16 May 2019 WAFU Cup	Ghana	0–0 (2–4 p)	Nigeria	Abidjan, Ivory Coast
		Report		Stadium: Parc des Sports de Treichville

18 May 2019 WAFU Cup	Ghana	0–0 (8–7 p)	Mali	Abidjan, Ivory Coast
		Report		Stadium: Stade Robert Champroux

28 August 2019 Olympic Games Q	Gabon	0–3	Ghana	Libreville, Gabon
		Report	Owusua 41'; Boakye 62'; Okyere 86'	Stadium: Stade Augustin Monédan de Sibang

3 September 2019 Olympic Games Q	Ghana	2–0	Gabon	(Ghana) Accra
	Boakye 15'; Acheampong 69'	Report		Stadium: Accra Sports Stadium

4 October 2019 Olympic Games Q	Ghana	0–0	Kenya	(Ghana) Accra
		Report		Stadium: Accra Sports Stadium

8 October 2019 Olympic Games Q	Kenya	1–0	Ghana	Kasarani, Kenya
	Shikangwa 99' (pen.)	Report		Stadium: Moi International Sports Centre

=== 2020 ===
4 March 2020 Turkish Women's Cup	Chile	3–0	Ghana	Alanya, Turkey
	Araya 55' (pen.); Sáez 57'; Pardo 71'	Report		Stadium: Gold City Sport Complex

7 March 2020 Turkish Women's Cup	Northern Ireland U-19	0–4	Ghana	Alanya, Turkey
		Report	Adubea 17'; Sesu 32'; Asantewaa 40', 53'	Stadium: Gold City Sport Complex

10 March 2020 Turkish Women's Cup	Ghana	3–1	Kenya	Alanya, Turkey
	Addo 9', 55' (pen.); Asantewaa 83'	Report	unknown 90+4'	Stadium: Gold City Sport Complex

26 November 2020 Friendly	Ghana	3–1	Morocco	(Ghana) Accra
	Kyeremeh 26'; Eshun 45+3'; Aoyem 62'	Report	Chebbak 5' (pen.)	Stadium: Accra Sports Stadium

30 November 2020 Friendly	Ghana	2–0	Morocco	(Ghana) Accra
	Owusu-Ansah 11', 15'	Report		Stadium: Accra Sports Stadium

=== 2021 ===
17 September Aisha Buhari Cup	South Africa	3–0	Ghana

20 September Aisha Buhari Cup	Cameroon	0–2	Ghana

20 October 2022 AFWCON qualification First round 1st leg	Nigeria	2–0	Ghana	Lagos, Nigeria
	Kanu 22', 26'	Report		Stadium: Onikan Stadium; Referee: Vincentia Amedome (Togo)

24 October 2022 AFWCON qualification First round 2nd leg	Ghana	1–0 (1–2 agg.)	Nigeria	Accra, Ghana
	Adubea 48'	Report (FIFA); Report (Soccerway)		Stadium: Accra Sports Stadium; Referee: Zomadre Kore (Ivory Coast)
Note: Nigeria won 2–1 on aggregate.

=== 2022 ===
12 April International Friendly	Morocco	2–0	Ghana
	Ayane 49', 76'

=== 2023 ===
25 February 2023 International Friendly	Ghana	Cancelled	Togo	Cotonou, Benin
--:-- UTC+1				Stadium: Stade de l'Amitié

17 May 2023 Friendly	Ghana	11–0	Niger

8 April 2023 International Friendly	Ghana	3–0	Senegal	Accra, Ghana
16:00 UTC+0	Assifuah 2', 45+1'; Asantewaa 9'	Report		Stadium: Accra Sports Stadium; Referee: Vincentia Amedome (Togo)

11 April 2023 International Friendly	Ghana	1–0	Senegal	Accra, Ghana
16:00 UTC+0	Badu 84'	Report		Stadium: Accra Sports Stadium

14 July 2023 2024 Olympic qualifying	Guinea	0–3	Ghana	Conakry, Guinea
			Adjei 19'; Adubea 27'; Badu 72'	Stadium: General Lansana Conté Stadium

18 July 2023 2024 Olympic qualifying	Ghana	4–0 (7–0 agg.)	Guinea	Accra, Ghana
				Stadium: Accra Sports Stadium
Note: Ghana won 7–0 on aggregate.

20 September 2023 2024 AFWCON qualification First round 1st leg	Rwanda	0–7	Ghana	Kigali, Rwanda
15:00 UTC+2		Report	Boaduwaa 3'; Badu 14', 64'; Adubea 28'; Kusi 51'; Achiaa 76', 81'	Stadium: Kigali Pelé Stadium

26 September 2023 2024 AFWCON qualification First round 2nd leg	Ghana	5–0 (12–0 agg.)	Rwanda	Accra, Ghana
16:00 UTC+0	Alice Kusi 22', 26', 37'; Badu 42'; Nyamekye 90+3'	Report (GFA)		Stadium: Accra Sports Stadium; Referee: Jacqueline Nikiema (Burkina Faso)
Note: Ghana won 12–0 on aggregate.

27 October 2023 2024 Olympic qualifying	Benin	0–3	Ghana	Cotonou, Benin
18:00 UTC+1		Report	Boaduwaa 44' (pen.); Assifuah 73', 78'	Stadium: Stade de l'Amitié

31 October 2023 2024 Olympic qualifying	Ghana	2–0 (5–0 agg.)	Benin	Accra, Ghana
				Stadium: Accra Sports Stadium
Note: Ghana won 5–0 on aggregate

1 December 2023 2024 AFWCON qualification Second round 1st leg	Ghana	3–1	Namibia	Accra, Ghana
15:30 UTC+0	Boaduwaa 26', 58'; Boakye 37'	Report	Boakye 69' (o.g.)	Stadium: Accra Sports Stadium; Referee: Ghada Mehat (Algeria)

5 December 2023 2024 AFWCON qualification Second round 2nd leg	Namibia	1–0 (2–3 agg.)	Ghana	Pretoria, South Africa
	Nanamus 15'			Stadium: Lucas Moripe Stadium
Note: Ghana won 3–2 on aggregate.

=== 2024 ===
23 February 2024 2024 Olympic qualifying	Ghana	0–1	Zambia	Accra, Ghana
			Kundananji 18'	Stadium: Accra Sports Stadium

28 February 2024 2024 Olympic qualifying	Zambia	3–3 (4–3 agg.)	Ghana	Ndola, Zambia
	Banda 10', 90+6'; Assifuah 61' (o.g.)		Assifuah 22'; Boaduwaa 55'; Bugre 64'	Stadium: Levy Mwanawasa Stadium
Note: Zambia won 4–3 on aggregate.

13 July MS&AD Cup	Japan	4–0	Ghana	Kanazawa, Japan
15:20 UTC+9	Tanaka 51'; Hamano 65'; Fujino 67'; Ueki 80'	Report (JFA)		Stadium: Kanazawa Go Go Curry Stadium; Attendance: 9,648; Referee: Oh Hyeon-jeong (Korea)

=== 2025 ===
21 February Friendly	Morocco	1–0	Ghana	Casablanca, Morocco
18:00 UTC+1	Ouzraoui Diki 90+1'	Report		Stadium: Père Jégo Stadium

5 April Friendly	Senegal	0–1	Ghana	Thiès, Senegal
16:00 UTC+0		Report	Badu 24'; Achiaa (red card) 62'	Stadium: Stade Lat-Dior

8 April Friendly	Senegal	1–0	Ghana	Thiès, Senegal
17:00 UTC+1	H. Diallo 90'	Report		Stadium: Stade Lat-Dior

30 May Friendly	Ivory Coast	3–3	Ghana	Abidjan, Ivory Coast
19:00 UTC+0	Konan 44', 80'; Kouassi 65'	Report	Sumaila 20'; Boye-Hlorkah 41'; Kpaho 52' (o.g.)	Stadium: Felix Houphouet Boigny Stadium; Referee: Edoh Kindedji (Togo)

3 June Friendly	Ivory Coast	1–0	Ghana	Abidjan, Ivory Coast
19:00 UTC+0	Ouédraogo 52'	Report		Stadium: Felix Houphouet Boigny Stadium

21 June Friendly	Ghana	3–1	Malawi	Benslimane, Morocco
17:00 UTC+1	Boaduwaa 23' (pen.), 32', 81'	Report	Sani 15'	Stadium: Ziaida Sports Complex

25 June Friendly	Ghana	4–2	Benin	Benslimane, Morocco
17:00 UTC+1	Norshie 4'; Kusi 55'; Duah 70'; Boye-Hlorkah 81'	Report	Gbedjissi 12', 32' (pen.)	Stadium: Ziaida Sports Complex

29 June Friendly	Ghana	1−3	Nigeria	Benslimane, Morocco
17:00 UTC+1	Kusi 88' (pen.)	Report	Ihezuo 34'; Oshoala 44' (pen.); Ajibade 50'	Stadium: Ziaida Sports Complex

7 July CAF WAFCON 2024 GS	South Africa	2–0	Ghana	Oujda, Morocco
17:00	Motlhalo 28' (pen.); Seoposenwe 34'	Report		Stadium: Honneur Stadium; Referee: Bouchra Karboubi (Morocco)

11 July CAF WAFCON 2024 GS	Ghana	1–1	Mali	Berkane, Morocco
17:00	Kusi 6'	Report	A. Traoré 52'	Stadium: Berkane Stadium; Referee: Ghada Mehat (Algeria)

14 July 2025 CAF WAFCON 2024 GS	Ghana	4 - 1	Tanzania	Berkane, Morocco
20:00 UTC+1	Adubea 12'; Kusi 63' (pen.); Badu 87'; Boye-Hlorkah 90'	Report	Athumani 41'	Stadium: Berkane Stadium; Referee: Dorsaf Ganouati (Tunisia) Dorsaf Ganouati

19 July 2025 2024 WAFCON QF	Algeria	0–0 (a.e.t.) (2–4 p)	Ghana	Berkane, Morocco
18:00 UTC+1		Report		Stadium: Berkane Stadium; Referee: Aline Umutoni (Rwanda)
	Penalties
	Dafeur (penalty missed); Guellati (penalty scored); Belloumou (penalty missed); Taleb Muller (penalty scored)		(penalty scored) Bonsu; (penalty scored) Boaduwaa; (penalty scored) Boye-Hlorkah; (penalty scored) Badu

22 July 2025 CAF WAFCON 2024 SF	Morocco	1–1 (a.e.t.) (4–2 p)	Ghana	Rabat, Morocco
21:00	Ouzraoui 55'	Report	Nyamekye 26'	Stadium: Olympic Stadium; Referee: Suavis Iratunga (Burundi)
	Penalties
	Aït El Haj (penalty scored); Jraïdi (penalty scored); Chapelle (penalty scored); Lahmari (penalty scored)		(penalty scored) Bonsu; (penalty scored) Kusi; (penalty missed) Badu; (penalty missed) Yeboah

25 July CAF WAFCON 2024 3rd	Ghana	1–1 (4–3 p)	South Africa	Casablanca, Morocco
21:00	Dlamini 68' (o.g.)	Report	Mthandi 45'	Stadium: Larbi Zaouli Stadium; Referee: Shahenda El Maghrabi (Egypt)
	Penalties
	Chantelle (penalty missed); Kusi (penalty scored); Bonsu (penalty scored); Cudjoe (penalty scored); Amoh (penalty scored)		(penalty scored) Motlhalo; (penalty scored) Mbane; (penalty missed) Holweni; (penalty missed) Magaia; (penalty scored) Seoposenwe

23 October 2025 2026 WAFCON qualifying	Egypt	0–3	Ghana	Ismailia
18:00 UTC+2		Report (FIFA)	Boaduwaa 42'; Amponsah 85'; Asantewaa 90+2'	Stadium: Suez Canal Stadium; Referee: Akhona Makalima (South Africa)

28 October 2025 2026 WAFCON qualifying	Ghana	4–0	Egypt	Accra
15:30 UTC+0	Boaduwaa 52', 55', 90+2'; Yeboah 57'	Report (FIFA)		Stadium: Accra Sports Stadium; Referee: Antsino Twanyanyukwa (Namibia)
Note: Ghana won 7–0 on aggregate.

2 December Friendly	England	2–0	Ghana	Southampton, England
19:00 GMT	Kendall 6'; Russo 90+5' (pen.)	Report		Stadium: St Mary's Stadium; Attendance: 20,252; Referee: Lina Lehtovaara (Finland)

== Record by opponent ==
All-time record of the Ghana women's national football team
Opponents	P	W	D	L	GF	GA	First
Algeria	3	2	0	1	3	2	2010
Angola	2	2	0	0	4	1	2007
Australia	3	1	1	1	4	6	1999
Brazil	1	0	0	1	1	5	2008
Burkina Faso	3	3	0	0	10	1	2014
Cameroon	16	6	7	3	20	15	1998
Canada	2	0	1	1	1	5	2003
Chile	1	0	0	1	0	3	2020
China	4	0	0	4	2	12	1999
DR Congo	6	6	0	0	15	4	1998
Egypt	4	3	1	0	11	2	1998
Equatorial Guinea	1	0	0	1	1	3	2010
Ethiopia	9	6	2	1	15	5	2002
France	1	0	0	1	0	8	2017
Gabon	2	2	0	0	5	0	2019
Germany	1	0	0	1	0	11	2016
Guinea	6	6	0	0	48	1	1998
Ivory Coast	6	3	2	1	6	2	2008
Japan	3	0	0	3	1	16	2014
Kenya	5	2	2	1	7	4	2016
Liberia	2	2	0	0	11	0	2011
Mali	7	5	1	1	15	3	2002
Morocco	3	3	0	0	8	1	2000
Namibia	2	2	0	0	6	1	2014
Niger	1	1	0	0	9	0	2018
Nigeria	18	2	7	9	12	28	1991
Northern Ireland U-19	1	1	0	0	4	0	2020
Norway	1	0	0	1	2	7	2007
Russia	1	0	0	1	0	3	2003
Senegal	5	5	0	0	12	1	2002
South Africa	15	8	3	2	16	5	1998
Sweden	1	0	0	1	0	2	1999
Tanzania	1	1	0	0	2	1	2011
Togo	1	1	0	0	6	0	2019
Tunisia	3	3	0	0	9	3	2008
Zambia	1	0	0	1	2	3	2018
Zimbabwe	5	4	1	0	14	7	2000
Total	140	76	28	36	267	165	
