= Women's Africa Cup of Nations records and statistics =

This article concerns the records and statistics of the Women's Africa Cup of Nations, previously known as the African Women's Championship.

== General performances ==
=== Teams reaching the semi-finals/top four ===
Team	Winners	Runners-up	Third-place	Fourth-place	Total top four
Nigeria	10 (1998*, 2000, 2002*, 2004, 2006*, 2010, 2014, 2016, 2018, 2024)	—	1 (2008)	2 (2012, 2022)	13
Equatorial Guinea	2 (2008*, 2012*)	1 (2010)	—	—	3
South Africa	1 (2022)	4 (2000*, 2008, 2012, 2018)	2 (2006, 2010*)	4 (2002, 2014, 2016, 2024)	11
Cameroon	1 (2026)	3 (2004, 2014, 2016*)	3 (2002, 2012, 2018)	4 (1998, 2006, 2008, 2010)	11
Ghana	—	3 (1998, 2002, 2006)	4 (2000, 2004, 2016, 2024)	—	7
Morocco	—	2 (2022*, 2024*)	—	1 (2026*)	3
Malawi	—	1 (2026)	—	—	1
DR Congo	—	—	1 (1998)	—	1
Ivory Coast	—	—	1 (2014)	—	1
Zambia	—	—	1 (2022)	—	1
Algeria	—	—	1 (2026)	—	1
Zimbabwe	—	—	—	1 (2000)	1
Ethiopia	—	—	—	1 (2004)	1
Mali	—	—	—	1 (2018)	1

* hosts
** losing semi-finals

=== Ranking of teams by number of appearances ===
As of 2026 Women's Africa Cup of Nations

Team	Appearances	Debut	Most recent	Best result
Nigeria	14	1998	2026	Champions (1998, 2000, 2002, 2004, 2006, 2010, 2014, 2016, 2018, 2024)
South Africa	14	1998	2026	Champions (2022)
Cameroon	13	1998	2026	Champions (2026)
Ghana	12	1998	2026	Runners-up (1998, 2002, 2006)
Mali	9	2002	2026	Fourth place (2018)
Algeria	7	2004	2026	Third place (2026)
Equatorial Guinea	5	2006	2018	Champions (2008, 2012)
Morocco	5	1998	2026	Runners-up (2022, 2024)
Zambia	5	2014	2026	Third place (2022)
DR Congo	4	1998	2024	Third place (1998)
Zimbabwe	4	2000	2016	Fourth place (2000)
Senegal	4	2012	2026	Quarter-finals (2022, 2024)
Ivory Coast	3	2012	2026	Third place (2014)
Ethiopia	3	2002	2012	Fourth place (2004)
Tunisia	3	2008	2024	Quarter-finals (2022)
Egypt	3	1998	2026	Group stage
Tanzania	3	2010	2026	Group stage
Botswana	2	2022	2024	Quarter-finals (2022)
Uganda	2	2000	2022	Group stage
Kenya	2	2016	2026	Group stage
Burkina Faso	2	2022	2026	Group stage
Malawi	1	2026	2026	Runners-up (2026)
Réunion	1	2000	2000	Group stage
Angola	1	2002	2002	Group stage
Congo	1	2008	2008	Group stage
Namibia	1	2014	2014	Group stage
Burundi	1	2022	2022	Group stage
Togo	1	2022	2022	Group stage
Cape Verde	1	2026	2026	Group stage

== Overall team statistics ==
As of 2026 Women's Africa Cup of Nations

Rank	Team	Part	M	W	D	L	GF	GA	GD	Points
1	Nigeria	14	71	52	10	9	199	37	+162	166
2	South Africa	14	66	31	11	24	97	73	+24	104
3	Cameroon	13	62	28	16	18	81	79	+2	100
4	Ghana	12	51	24	13	14	79	47	+32	85
5	Equatorial Guinea	5	21	13	2	6	46	39	+7	41
6	Morocco	5	24	11	7	6	35	38	−3	40
7	Zambia	5	19	8	5	6	28	28	0	29
8	Mali	9	30	7	4	19	33	72	−39	25
9	Algeria	7	25	6	5	14	22	45	−23	23
10	Ivory Coast	3	12	5	2	5	24	21	+3	17
11	Senegal	4	14	4	3	7	11	15	−4	15
12	Malawi	1	6	4	0	2	12	10	+2	12
13	Zimbabwe	4	14	2	5	7	13	28	−15	11
14	DR Congo	4	14	2	3	9	16	40	−24	9
15	Ethiopia	3	11	1	4	6	6	24	−18	7
16	Botswana	2	7	2	0	5	7	10	−3	6
17	Uganda	2	6	1	2	3	7	13	−6	5
18	Tunisia	3	10	1	2	7	8	15	−7	5
19	Burkina Faso	2	6	1	1	4	5	10	−5	4
20	Tanzania	3	9	1	1	7	9	19	−10	4
21	Namibia	1	3	1	0	2	3	5	−2	3
22	Congo	1	3	1	0	2	3	6	−3	3
23	Egypt	3	9	1	0	8	6	36	−30	3
24	Angola	1	3	0	2	1	2	3	−1	2
25	Cape Verde	1	3	0	1	2	3	6	−3	1
26	Togo	1	3	0	1	2	3	9	−6	1
27	Réunion	1	3	0	0	3	2	7	−5	0
28	Burundi	1	3	0	0	3	3	11	−8	0
29	Kenya	2	6	0	0	6	2	17	−15	0

== Comprehensive team results by tournament ==
Legend

- 1st – Champions
- 2nd – Runners-up
- 3rd – Third place
- 4th – Fourth place
- SF – Semi-finals
- QF – Quarter-finalists
- GS – Group stage
- W – Winner and advance to World Cup
- Q – Qualified
- • – Did not qualify
- × – Did not enter
- × – Withdrew before qualification
- — Withdrew/Disqualified after qualification
- – Hosts

For each tournament, the number of teams in each finals tournament (in brackets) are shown.

Team (Total 31 teams)	1991	1995	1998 (Nigeria)	2000 (South Africa)	2002 (Nigeria)	2004 (South Africa)	2006 (Nigeria)	2008 (Equatorial Guinea)	2010 (South Africa)	2012 (Equatorial Guinea)	2014 (Namibia)	2016 (Cameroon)	2018 (Ghana)	2022 (Morocco)	2024 (Morocco)	2026 (Morocco)	App.
Team (Total 31 teams)	(4)	(6)	(7)	(8)										(12)		(16)	App.
Algeria	×	×	×	•	×	GS	GS	•	GS	×	GS	•	GS	•	QF	3rd	7
Angola	×	SF	×	×	GS	×	•	×	•	×	×	×	×	•	•	•	2
Botswana	×	×	×	×	×	×	×	•	•	•	•	•	×	QF	GS	•	2
Burkina Faso	×	×	×	×	×	×	×	×	×	×	•	•	•	GS	•	GS	2
Burundi												×	×	GS	•	•	1
Cameroon	2nd	×	4th	GS	3rd	2nd	4th	4th	4th	3rd	2nd	2nd	3rd	QF	•	1st	14
Cape Verde														×	•	GS	1
Congo		×	×	×	×	•	•	GS	×	×	×	×	•	•	•	×	1
DR Congo	×	×	3rd	×	•	×	GS	•	•	GS	×	×	×	×	GS	•	4
Egypt	×	×	GS	•	×	×	•	×	×	•	•	GS	×	•	•	GS	3
Equatorial Guinea	×	×	×	×	•	•	GS	1st	2nd	1st	•	•	GS	•	•	•	5
Ethiopia	×	×	×	×	GS	4th	×	×	•	GS	•	•	•	•	•	•	3
Ghana	QF	SF	2nd	3rd	2nd	3rd	2nd	GS	GS	•	GS	3rd	GS	•	3rd	QF	14
Guinea	SF	×	•	×	×	•	•	•	•	•	×	•	×	•	•	•	1
Ivory Coast	×	×	×	×	•	×	•	•	•	GS	3rd	•	•	•	•	QF	3
Kenya	×	×	×	×	×	×	•	×	×	×	•	GS	•	•	•	GS	2
Malawi						•	•	×	×	•	×	×	×	•	×	2nd	1
Mali	×	×	×	×	GS	GS	GS	GS	GS	•	•	GS	4th	•	QF	GS	9
Morocco	×	×	GS	GS	•	×	•	•	•	•	•	•	•	2nd	2nd	4th	5
Namibia	×	×	×	×	×	×	•	•	•	•	GS	•	•	•	•	•	1
Nigeria	W	W	1st	1st	1st	1st	1st	3rd	1st	4th	1st	1st	1st	4th	1st	QF	16
Réunion				GS													1
Senegal		×	×	×	•	•	•	•	•	GS	•	•	•	QF	QF	GS	4
Sierra Leone	×	QF	×	×	×	×	×	×	•	×	×	×	×	•	×	•	1
South Africa	×	2nd	GS	2nd	4th	GS	3rd	2nd	3rd	2nd	4th	4th	2nd	1st	4th	QF	15
Tanzania	×	×	×	×	•	•	•	•	GS	•	•	•	•	•	GS	GS	3
Togo	×	×	×	×	×	×	•	×	×	×	×	×	×	GS	•	•	1
Tunisia	×	×	×	×	×	×	×	GS	•	•	•	•	×	QF	GS	•	3
Uganda	×	×	•	GS	•	×	×	×	×	•	×	×	•	GS	•	•	2
Zambia		QF	×	×	•	×	•	•	×	•	GS	•	GS	3rd	QF	GS	6
Zimbabwe		×	×	4th	GS	GS	×	•	×	•	•	GS	•	•	×	•	4

=== Debut of national teams ===
Year	Debuting teams		
Year	Teams	No.	Cum.
1998	Cameroon, DR Congo, Egypt, Ghana, Morocco, Nigeria, South Africa	7	7
2000	Réunion, Uganda, Zimbabwe	3	10
2002	Angola, Ethiopia, Mali	3	13
2004	Algeria	1	14
2006	Equatorial Guinea, Tunisia	2	16
2008	Congo	1	17
2010	Tanzania	1	18
2012	Ivory Coast, Senegal	2	20
2014	Namibia, Zambia	2	22
2016	Kenya	1	23
2018	None	0	23
2022	Botswana, Burkina Faso, Burundi, Togo	4	27
2024	None	0	27
2026	Cape Verde, Malawi	2	29

== Medal table ==
Rank	Nation	Gold	Silver	Bronze	Total
1	Nigeria	10	0	1	11
2	Equatorial Guinea	2	1	0	3
3	South Africa	1	4	2	7
4	Cameroon	1	3	3	7
5	Ghana	0	3	4	7
6	Morocco	0	2	0	2
7	Malawi	0	1	0	1
8	Algeria	0	0	1	1
8	DR Congo	0	0	1	1
8	Ivory Coast	0	0	1	1
8	Zambia	0	0	1	1
Totals (11 entries)		14	14	14	42

== Results of host nations ==
=== Most tournaments hosted ===
Years in bold indicate hosting nation won the tournament.

No. of times hosted	Country	Year(s)	Wins as host
Thrice	Nigeria	**1998, 2002, 2006**	3/3
Thrice	South Africa	2000, 2004, 2010	0/3
Thrice	Morocco	2022, 2024, 2026	0/3
Twice	Equatorial Guinea	**2008, 2012**	2/2
Once	Namibia	2014	0/1
Once	Cameroon	2016	0/1
Once	Ghana	2018	0/1

Year	Host nation	Result
1998	Nigeria	**Champions**
2000	South Africa	**Runners-up**
2002	Nigeria	**Champions**
2004	South Africa	Group Stage
2006	Nigeria	**Champions**
2008	Equatorial Guinea	**Champions**
2010	South Africa	**Third place**
2012	Equatorial Guinea	**Champions**
2014	Namibia	Group Stage
2016	Cameroon	**Runners-up**
2018	Ghana	Group Stage
2022	Morocco	**Runners-up**
2024	Morocco	**Runners-up**
2026	Morocco	**Fourth place**

== Results of defending finalists ==
Year	Defending champions	Finish	Defending runners-up	Finish
2000	Nigeria	**Champions**	Ghana	**Third place**
2002	Nigeria	**Champions**	South Africa	**Fourth place**
2004	Nigeria	**Champions**	Ghana	**Third place**
2006	Nigeria	**Champions**	Cameroon	**Fourth place**
2008	Nigeria	**Third place**	Ghana	Group Stage
2010	Equatorial Guinea	**Runners-up**	South Africa	**Third place**
2012	Nigeria	**Fourth place**	Equatorial Guinea	**Champions**
2014	Equatorial Guinea	Did not qualify	South Africa	**Fourth place**
2016	Nigeria	**Champions**	Cameroon	**Runners-up**
2018	Nigeria	**Champions**	Cameroon	**Third place**
2022	Nigeria	**Fourth place**	South Africa	**Champions**
2024	South Africa	**Fourth place**	Morocco	**Runners-up**
2026	Nigeria	**Quarter-finals**	Morocco	**Fourth place**

== Results by regions ==
Total times teams qualified by region
Region	WAFU	UNIFFAC	COSAFA	UNAF	CECAFA	Total
Top 8	9	2	7	6	0	24
Top 4	22	15	14	4	1	56
Top 2	13	7	6	2	0	28
1st	10	3	1	0	0	14
2nd	3	4	5	2	0	14
3rd	6	4	3	1	0	14
4th	3	4	5	1	1	14

Champions by region
Region	Champion(s)	Titles
WAFU (West Africa)	Nigeria (10)	10
UNIFFAC (Central Africa)	Equatorial Guinea (2), Cameroon (1)	3
COSAFA (Southern Africa)	South Africa (1)	1
UNAF (North Africa)	–	–
CECAFA (East Africa)	–	–

== General statistics by tournament ==
Year	Hosts	Champions (titles)	Winning Coach	Player of the Tournament	Top scorer(s) (goals)	Best Goalkeeper
1998	Nigeria	Nigeria **(1)**	(Nigeria) Ismaila Mabo	—N/a	(Nigeria) Nkiru Okosieme **(3)**	—N/a
2000	South Africa	Nigeria **(2)**	(Nigeria) Ismaila Mabo	—N/a	(Nigeria) Mercy Akide **(7)**	—N/a
2002	Nigeria	Nigeria **(3)**	(Nigeria) Samuel Okpodu	—N/a	(Nigeria) Perpetua Nkwocha **(4)**	—N/a
2004	South Africa	Nigeria **(4)**	(Nigeria) Godwin Izilien	(Nigeria) Perpetua Nkwocha	(Nigeria) Perpetua Nkwocha **(9)**	—N/a
2006	Nigeria	Nigeria **(5)**	(Nigeria) Ntiero Effiom	(South Africa) Portia Modise	(Nigeria) Perpetua Nkwocha **(7)**	—N/a
2008	Equatorial Guinea	Equatorial Guinea **(1)**	(Ivory Coast) Clémentine Touré	(Cameroon) Noko Matlou	(Equatorial Guinea) Genoveva Añonman **(6)**	—N/a
2010	South Africa	Nigeria **(6)**	(Nigeria) Ngozi Eucharia Uche	(Nigeria) Stella Mbachu	(Nigeria) Perpetua Nkwocha **(11)**	—N/a
2012	Equatorial Guinea	Equatorial Guinea **(2)**	(Argentina) Esteban Becker	(Equatorial Guinea) Genoveva Añonman	(Equatorial Guinea) Genoveva Añonman **(6)**	—N/a
2014	Namibia	Nigeria **(7)**	(Nigeria) Edwin Okon	(Nigeria) Asisat Oshoala	(Nigeria) Desire Oparanozie **(5)**	(Cameroon) Annette Ngo Ndom
2016	Cameroon	Nigeria **(8)**	(Nigeria) Florence Omagbemi	(Cameroon) Gabrielle Onguéné	(Nigeria) Asisat Oshoala **(6)**	(Cameroon) Annette Ngo Ndom
2018	Ghana	Nigeria **(9)**	(Sweden) Thomas Dennerby	(South Africa) Thembi Kgatlana	(South Africa) Thembi Kgatlana **(5)**	(Nigeria) Tochukwu Oluehi
2022	Morocco	South Africa **(1)**	(South Africa) Desiree Ellis	(Morocco) Ghizlane Chebbak	(Morocco) Ghizlane Chebbak **(3)** (Nigeria) Rasheedat Ajibade **(3)** (South Africa) Hildah Magaia **(3)**	(South Africa) Andile Dlamini
2024	Morocco	Nigeria **(10)**	(Nigeria) Justine Madugu	(Nigeria) Rasheedat Ajibade	(Morocco) Ghizlane Chebbak **(5)**	(Nigeria) Chiamaka Nnadozie
2026	Morocco	Cameroon **(1)**	(Cameroon) Valentine Nguele	(Cameroon) Monique Ngock	(Cameroon) Marie Ngah Manga **(5)** (Malawi) Temwa Chaŵinga **(5)** (Zambia) Barbra Banda **(5)**	(Cameroon) Michaely Bihina

== Teams: tournament position ==
Teams having equal quantities in the tables below are ordered by the tournament the quantity was attained in (the teams that attained the quantity first are listed first). If the quantity was attained by more than one team in the same tournament, these teams are ordered alphabetically.

Most titles won
10, Nigeria (1998, 2000, 2002, 2004, 2006, 2010, 2014, 2016, 2018, 2024).
Most finishes in the top two
10, Nigeria (1998, 2000, 2002, 2004, 2006, 2010, 2014, 2016, 2018, 2024).
Most finishes in the top four
13, Nigeria (1998, 2000, 2002, 2004, 2006, 2008, 2010, 2012, 2014, 2016, 2018, 2022, 2024).
Most second-place finishes
4, South Africa (2000, 2008, 2012, 2018).
Most third-place finishes
4, Ghana (2000, 2004, 2016, 2024).
Most third/fourth-place finishes
7, Cameroon (1998, 2002, 2006, 2008, 2010, 2012, 2016).
Most championship appearances
14, Nigeria and South Africa.(every tournament)

=== Consecutive ===
Most consecutive championships
5, Nigeria (1998–2006).
Most consecutive finishes in the top two
5, Nigeria (1998–2006).
Most consecutive finishes in the top three
7, Nigeria (1998–2010).
Most consecutive finishes in the top four
13, Nigeria (1998–2024).
Most consecutive appearances in the finals tournament
14, Nigeria & South Africa (1998–2026) (every tournament).
Most consecutive second-place finishes
2, Cameroon (2014–2016), Morocco (2022–2024).
Most consecutive third-place finishes
no country has finished third in two consecutive tournaments
Most consecutive fourth-place finishes
3, Cameroon (2006–2010).

=== Gaps ===
Longest gap between successive titles
6 years, Nigeria (2018–2024).(1 edition)
Longest gap between successive appearances in the top two
10 years, Cameroon (2004–2014),(2016-2026).
Longest gap between successive appearances in the top four
10 years, Ghana (2000–2016).
Longest gap between successive appearances in the finals
22 years, Morocco and Uganda (2000–2022).

=== Host team ===
Best finish by host team
Champion: Nigeria (1998, 2002, 2006) Equatorial Guinea (2008, 2012).
Worst finish by host team
Group stage: South Africa (2004), Namibia (2014), Ghana (2018).

=== Defending champion ===
Best finish by defending champion
Champion: Nigeria (2000, 2002, 2004, 2006, 2016, 2018).
Worst finish by defending champion
Did not qualify: Equatorial Guinea (2014).

=== Debuting teams ===
Best finish by a debuting team
Champion: Nigeria (1998).
Best finish by a debuting team, excluding inaugural tournament
Runners-up: Malawi (2026).

==== Top scoring teams by tournament ====
- 1998: **Nigeria**, 28 goals
- 2000: **Nigeria**, 19 goals
- 2002: **Nigeria**, 15 goals
- 2004: **Nigeria**, 18 goals
- 2006: **Nigeria**, 18 goals
- 2008: **Equatorial Guinea**, 11 goals
- 2010: **Nigeria**, 19 goals
- 2012: **Equatorial Guinea**, 18 goals
- 2014: **Nigeria**, 16 goals
- 2016: **Nigeria**, 13 goals
- 2018: South Africa, 11 goals
- 2022: **South Africa**, 10 goals
- 2024: **Nigeria**, 14 goals
- 2026: Malawi, 12 goals

Teams listed in bold won the tournament.

=== Other ===
Most finishes in the top two without ever being champion
3, Ghana (1998, 2002, 2006).
Most finishes in the top four without ever being champion
7, Ghana (1998–2006, 2016, 2024).
Most appearances without ever being champion
12, Ghana (1998–2010, 2014–2018, 2024, 2026).
Most finishes in the top four without ever finishing in the top two
1, DR Congo (1998), Ivory Coast (2014), Zambia (2022), Algeria (2026).
Most appearances without ever finishing in the top two
9, Mali (2000–2010, 2016, 2018, 2024, 2026).
Most appearances without ever finishing in the top four
4, Senegal (2012, 2022, 2024, 2026).
Most points in the group stage, yet eliminated
6, Zambia (2026)
Most meetings between two teams, final match
3, Nigeria vs Ghana (1998, 2002, 2006) and Nigeria vs Cameroon (2004, 2014, 2016).

==== Tournament progression ====
Progressed from the group stage the most times
14, Nigeria (every tournament).
Eliminated in the group stage the most times
7, Mali (2002–2010, 2016, 2026)
Most appearances, always progressed from the group stage
14, Nigeria (every tournament).
Most appearances, never progressing from the group stage
3, Egypt (1998, 2016, 2026) and Tanzania (2010, 2024, 2026).
Most consecutive appearances, progressing from the group stage
14, Nigeria (every tournament).
Most consecutive eliminations from the group stage
6, Mali (2002–2010, 2016).

== Teams: matches played and goals scored ==
=== All time ===
Most matches played
71, Nigeria.
Most wins
52, Nigeria.
Fewest wins
0, Angola, Togo, Réunion, Burundi, Kenya, Uganda.
Most losses
24, South Africa.
Fewest losses
2, Namibia, Angola, Togo, Congo, Uganda.
Most draws
16, Cameroon.
Most goals scored
199, Nigeria.
Most goals conceded
79, Cameroon.
Fewest goals scored
2, Réunion, Kenya.
Fewest goals conceded
5, Namibia.
Highest goal difference
+162, Nigeria.
Lowest goal difference
−39, Mali.

=== In one tournament ===
Most wins
6, South Africa (2022, out of 6)
Winning all matches

Nigeria (1998, 2006, 2010, 2014, 5 matches), Equatorial Guinea, (2012, 5 matches), South Africa, (2022, 6 matches).

Most goals scored
28, Nigeria, (1998).
Most goals scored, group stage
20, Nigeria, (1998).
Most goals scored, champions
28, Nigeria, 1998.
Most goals scored, hosts
28, Nigeria, (1998).
Fewest goals scored, champions
8, Cameroon, (2026).
Fewest goals scored, hosts
2, South Africa, (2004).
Most goals conceded, champions
4, Equatorial Guinea, (2008), Nigeria, (2010).
Fewest goals conceded, champions
0, Nigeria, (1998), Equatorial Guinea, (2012).

=== Tournament ===
Most goals scored in a tournament
90, 2026.
Fewest goals scored in a tournament
37, 2008.
Most goals per match in a tournament
4.77 goals per match, 1998.
Fewest goals per match in a tournament
2.25 goals per match, 2022.
Most players scoring at least two goals in a tournament
17: 2022.
Most players scoring at least three goals in a tournament
7: 2002.
Most players scoring at least four goals in a tournament
4: 2012, 2026.
Most players scoring at least five goals in a tournament
3: 2026.
Most players scoring at least six goals in a tournament
2: 2006.
Most players scoring at least nine goals in a tournament
1: 2000, 2010 (Perpetua Nkwocha Nigeria).
Most players scoring at least eleven goals in a tournament
1: 2010 (Perpetua Nkwocha Nigeria).

==== Other ====
Biggest margin of victory
8, Nigeria 8–0 Morocco, 1998
Biggest margin of victory, qualifying match
14, Algeria 14–0 Sudan, 20 October 2021, First Round
Most goals scored in a match, one team
8, Nigeria 8–0 Morocco, 1998
Most goals scored in a match, both teams
9, Ghana 6–3 Zimbabwe, 2000
Highest scoring draw
3–3, on two occasions:
DR Congo vs Cameroon,1998
Equatorial Guinea vs Algeria, 2006
Most goals scored in a final, one team
5, Nigeria 5–0 Cameroon, 2004
Most goals scored in a final, both teams
6, Nigeria 4–2 Equatorial Guinea, 2010
Fewest goals scored in a final, both teams
0, Nigeria 0–0 South Africa after extra time, 4–3 on penalties 2018
Biggest margin of victory in a final
5, Nigeria 5–0 Cameroon, 2004
Largest deficit overcome to win in a final
2, Nigeria, 2024 (coming from 0–2 down to win 3–2 vs Morocco)

== Streaks ==
Most consecutive wins
8, on two occasions:
Nigeria, from 3–0 vs Mali (2004) to 1–0 vs Ghana (2006)
Nigeria, from 5–0 vs Mali (2010) to 3–1 vs Ivory Coast (2012).
Most consecutive matches without a loss
16, Nigeria, from 5–1 vs Mali (2002) to 1–0 vs South Africa (2008).
Most consecutive losses
5, on two occasions:
Mali, from 0–2 vs Cameroon (2006) to 0–5 vs Nigeria (2010)
Algeria, from 0–2 vs Cameroon (2014) to 2–3 vs Mali (2018).
Most consecutive matches scoring at least one goal
16, Equatorial Guinea (2006–2012).
Most consecutive matches scoring at least two goals
12, Nigeria (2002–2006).
Most consecutive matches scoring at least three goals
5, Nigeria (2004–2006).
Most consecutive matches scoring at least four goals
4, Nigeria (1998), (2004–2006).
Most consecutive matches scoring at least six goals
4, Nigeria (1998).
Most consecutive matches without conceding a goal (clean sheets)
5, Nigeria (1998), Nigeria (2000–2002), Equatorial Guinea (2012).
Most consecutive matches conceding at least one goals
23, Mali (2002–2018).

=== Penalty shoot-outs ===
Most shoot-outs, team, all-time
5, Cameroon.
Most shoot-outs, team, tournament
3, Ghana, (2024).
Most shoot-outs, all teams, tournament
4, 2024.
Most shoot-out wins, team, all-time
3, Nigeria and Ghana.
Most wins, team, tournament
2, Nigeria, (2018) and Ghana, (2024).
Most shoot-out losses, team, all-time
4, Cameroon.
Most shoot-outs with 100% record (all won)
1, DR Congo, Zambia.
Most shoot-outs with 0% record (all lost)
1, Ethiopia, Senegal.

== Individual ==
Most championships
5, Florence Ajayi (Nigeria, 1998–2006),
Perpetua Nkwocha (Nigeria, 2002–2006, 2010, 2014),
Osinachi Ohale (Nigeria, 2010, 2014–2018, 2024),
Francisca Ordega (Nigeria, 2010, 2014–2018, 2024).
Most medals
6, Perpetua Nkwocha (Nigeria, 2002 (champions), 2004 (champions), 2006 (champions), 2008 (third place), 2010 (champions), 2014 (champions)
Most tournaments played
8, Gabrielle Aboudi Onguéné (Cameroon, 2008–2022, 2026).

=== Goalscoring ===
Most goals scored, final tournaments
34, Perpetua Nkwocha (Nigeria, 2002–2014).
Most goals scored, qualifying
13, Agueicha Diarra (Mali, 2022–2026).
Most goals scored, final tournaments and qualifying
41, Perpetua Nkwocha (Nigeria, 2002–2014).
Most goals scored in a tournament
11, Perpetua Nkwocha (Nigeria, 2010).
Most goals scored in a match
4, Perpetua Nkwocha (Nigeria), vs Cameroon, 2004;
Asisat Oshoala (Nigeria), vs Mali, 2016;
Barbra Banda (Zambia), vs Egypt, 2026.
Most goals scored in a qualifying match
5, Neddy Atieno (Kenya), vs South Sudan, 2021.
Most goals scored in all final matches
7, Perpetua Nkwocha (Nigeria), 1 vs Ghana in 2002, 4 vs Cameroon in 2004, 1 vs Ghana in 2006 & 1 vs Equatorial Guinea in 2010.
Most matches with at least one goal
20, Perpetua Nkwocha (Nigeria, 2002–2014).
Most consecutive matches with at least one goal
10, Perpetua Nkwocha (Nigeria, 2002–2006).
Most matches with at least two goals
9, Perpetua Nkwocha (Nigeria, 2002–2010).
Fastest hat-trick
9 minutes, Perpetua Nkwocha (Nigeria), scored at 45', 46' and 54', vs Cameroon, 2006.
Most tournaments with at least one goals
6, Perpetua Nkwocha (Nigeria, 2002–2006, 2010–2014).
Most tournaments with at least two goals
5, Perpetua Nkwocha (Nigeria, 2002–2006, 2010–2012).
Most tournaments with at least three goals
4, Perpetua Nkwocha (Nigeria, 2002–2006, 2010).
Most tournaments with at least four goals
4, Perpetua Nkwocha (Nigeria, 2002–2006, 2010).
Most tournaments with at least nine goals
2, Perpetua Nkwocha (Nigeria, 2004, 2010).
Youngest goalscorer
16 years, 325 days, Desire Oparanozie (Nigeria), vs Tanzania, 7 November 2010.
Youngest hat-trick scorer
19 years, 28 days, Ines Nrehy (Ivory Coast), vs Ethiopia, 29 October 2012.
Youngest goalscorer, final
16 years, 332 days, Desire Oparanozie (Nigeria), vs Equatorial Guinea, 14 November 2010.
Oldest goalscorer
40 years, 195 days, Racheal Nachula (Zambia), vs Egypt, 28 July 2026.
Oldest hat-trick scorer
34 years, 321 days, Ghizlane Chebbak (Morocco), vs DR Congo, 9 July 2025.
Oldest goalscorer, final
34 years, 338 days, Ghizlane Chebbak (Morocco), vs Nigeria, 26 July 2025.
Fastest goal
17 seconds, Mariem Houij (Tunisia vs Togo, 2022)
Fastest goal from kickoff in a final
8th minute, Perpetua Nkwocha (Nigeria), vs Equatorial Guinea, 2010.
Latest goal from kickoff
120+8th minute, Amanda Dlamini (South Africa), vs Equatorial Guinea, 2010.
Latest goal from kickoff in a final
88th minute, Jennifer Echegini (Nigeria), vs Morocco, 2024.

== Coaching ==
Most championships
2, Mabo Ismaila (Nigeria, 1998–2000).
Most consecutive titles won as coach
2, Mabo Ismaila (Nigeria, 1998–2000).
Most matches coached
27, Desiree Ellis (South Africa, 2016–2026).
Foreign championship
(Ivory Coast) Clémentine Touré (Equatorial Guinea, 2008); (Argentina) Esteban Becker (Equatorial Guinea, 2012); (Sweden) . Thomas Dennerby (Nigeria, 2018)
Most tournaments
5, Desiree Ellis (South Africa, 2016–2026).
Most consecutive tournaments with same team
5, Desiree Ellis (South Africa, 2016–2026).
Appearance in final as both player and coach

- Florence Omagbemi (won 1998, 2000, 2002, 2004 finals as a player, won 2016 final as a manager, all with Nigeria)
- Desiree Ellis (lost 2000 final as a player, lost 2018 final and won 2022 final as a manager, all with South Africa)

Most championship wins as player and head coach
5, Florence Omagbemi, Nigeria (1998, 2000, 2002, 2004 as playing squad member; 2016 as coach).

== Tournament awards ==
=== Top scorers (Golden boot) by year ===
Player	Country	Tournament edition	Number of goals	Ref
Nkiru Okosieme	Nigeria	1998	3 goals	
Mercy Akide	Nigeria	2000	7 goals	
Perpetua Nkwocha	Nigeria	2002	4 goals	
Perpetua Nkwocha	Nigeria	2004	9 goals	
Perpetua Nkwocha	Nigeria	2006	7 goals	
Genoveva Añonman	Equatorial Guinea	2008	6 goals	
Perpetua Nkwocha	Nigeria	2010	11 goals	
Genoveva Añonman	Equatorial Guinea	2012	6 goals	
Desire Oparanozie	Nigeria	2014	5 goals	
Asisat Oshoala	Nigeria	2016	6 goals	
Thembi Kgatlana	South Africa	2018	5 goals	
Ghizlane Chebbak; Rasheedat Ajibade; Hildah Magaia	Morocco; Nigeria; South Africa	2022	3 goals	
Ghizlane Chebbak	Morocco	2024	5 goals	
Temwa Chaŵinga; Marie Ngah Manga; Barbra Banda	Malawi; Cameroon; Zambia	2026	5 goals	

=== Best player (Golden ball) by year ===
Player	Country	Edition	Ref
		1998	
		2000	
		2002	
Perpetua Nkwocha	Nigeria	2004	
Portia Modise	South Africa	2006	
Noko Matlou	South Africa	2008	
Stella Mbachu	Nigeria	2010	
Genoveva Añonman	Equatorial Guinea	2012	
Asisat Oshoala	Nigeria	2014	
Gabrielle Onguéné	Cameroon	2016	
Thembi Kgatlana	South Africa	2018	
Ghizlane Chebbak	Morocco	2022	
Rasheedat Ajibade	Nigeria	2024	
Monique Ngock	Cameroon	2026	

=== Best Goalkeeper by year ===
Player	Country	Edition	Ref
		1998	
		2000	
		2002	
		2004	
		2006	
		2008	
		2010	
		2012	
Annette Ngo Ndom	Cameroon	2014	
		2016	
		2018	
Andile Dlamini	South Africa	2022	
Chiamaka Nnadozie	Nigeria	2024	
Michaely Bihina	Cameroon	2026	

== Hat-tricks ==
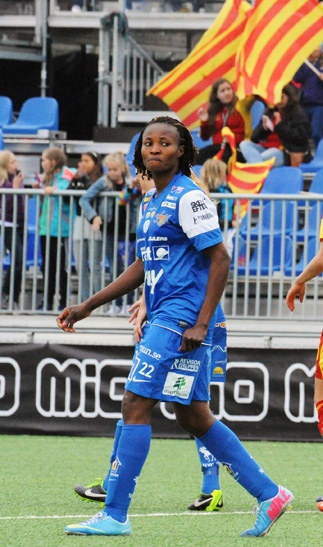
Perpetua Nkwocha of Nigeria is the only player, as at the 2022 edition, to have scored a hat-trick in back-to-back editions of the tournament, once in 2004 and 2006 and twice in 2010.

- Veronica Phewa from South Africa scored the first-ever hat-trick in the tournament's history in her side's group-stage win over Zimbabwe at the 2002 edition.
- Nigeria's Perpetua Nkwocha (in the final of the 2004 edition) and Asisat Oshoala (in 2016) are the only players to score 4 goals in match at an edition of the tournament.
- Nigeria (6) is the leading hat-trick scoring team at the tournament, with Perpetua Nkwocha (4) accounting for 80% of them.
- Cameroon has conceded the most hat-tricks (4) in the tournament as of the 2022 edition.

No.	Player	No. of goals	Time of goals	Team	Final score	Opponent	Edition	Round	Date
1.	Veronica Phewa	3	27', 33', 61'	South Africa	3–1	Zimbabwe	2002	Group stage	14 December 2002
2.	Perpetua Nkwocha	4	15', 35', 42', 60'	Nigeria	5–0	Cameroon	2004	Final	3 October 2004
3.	Perpetua Nkwocha (2)	3	45', 46', 54'	Nigeria	5–0	Cameroon	2006	Semi-finals	7 November 2006
4.	Noko Matlou	3	28', 47', 80'	South Africa	3–0	Cameroon	2008	Semi-finals	25 November 2008
5.	Perpetua Nkwocha (3)	3	15', 16', 42'	Nigeria	5–0	Mali	2010	Group stage	1 November 2010
6.	Amanda Dlamini	3	32', 76', 90'	South Africa	4–0	Mali	2010	Group stage	7 November 2010
7.	Perpetua Nkwocha (4)	3	54', 74', 81'	Nigeria	5–1	Cameroon	2010	Semi-finals	11 November 2010
8.	Ines Nrehy	3	1', 9', 68'	Ivory Coast	5–0	Ethiopia	2012	Group stage	29 October 2012
9.	Genoveva Añonman	3	25', 66', 73'	Equatorial Guinea	6–0	DR Congo	2012	Group stage	31 October 2012
10.	Andisiwe Mgcoyi	3	10', 48', 57'	South Africa	4–1	DR Congo	2012	Group stage	3 November 2012
11.	Asisat Oshoala	4	40', 64', 69', 78'	Nigeria	6–0	Mali	2016	Group stage	20 November 2016
12.	Asisat Oshoala (2)	3	13', 22', 44'	Nigeria	6–0	Equatorial Guinea	2018	Group stage	24 November 2018
13.	Ghizlane Chebbak	3	25', 43', 75'	Morocco	4–2	DR Congo	2024	Group stage	9 July 2025
14.	Barbra Banda	4	60', 63', 87', 90+6'	Zambia	6–0	Egypt	2026	Group stage	28 July 2026

== See also ==
- African Footballer of the Year
- African Women's Footballer of the Year
- List of hat-tricks
- List of Africa Cup of Nations hat-tricks
- List of sport awards
- List of sports awards honoring women
