= 2002 African Women's Championship =

5th edition of WAFCON

Tournament details
- Host country: Nigeria
- Dates: 7 – 20 December
- Teams: 8 (from 1 confederation)
- Venues: 2 (in 2 host cities)

Final positions
- Champions: Nigeria (5th title)
- Runners-up: Ghana
- Third place: Cameroon
- Fourth place: South Africa

Tournament statistics
- Matches played: 16
- Goals scored: 46 (2.88 per match)
- Top scorers: (Ghana) Alberta Sackey; (Nigeria) Perpetua Nkwocha; (South Africa) Veronica Phewa (4 goals)

The 2002 African Women's Championship was the 5th edition of the biennial African women's association football tournament organized by the Confederation of African Football. It took place in Nigeria between 7 and 20 December 2002.

This edition of the tournament also doubled as the African qualification for the 2003 FIFA Women's World Cup. Nigeria beat Ghana 2–0 in the final to with their 5th title, although both were guaranteed qualification to that international tournament edition held in the United States.

== Host selection ==
On 24 January 2001, the Botswana Football Association announced the submission of a hosting bid, but it was neither considered nor came to fruition by CAF.

CAF approached Nigeria at the 2002 African Cup of Nations in Mali for that tournament edition's hosting rights and got it on 19 March that year. Nigeria previously had the honor of hosting the tournament when it began full-scale in 1998.

== Qualification ==
Nigeria qualified automatically as both hosts and defending champions, while the remaining seven spots were determined by the qualifying rounds, which took place from August to October 2002.

=== Format ===
Qualification ties were played on a home-and-away two-legged basis. If the aggregate score was tied after the second leg, the away goals rule would be applied, and if still level, the penalty shoot-out would be used to determine the winner (no extra time would be played).

The seven winners of the final round qualified for the final tournament.

=== Qualified teams ===
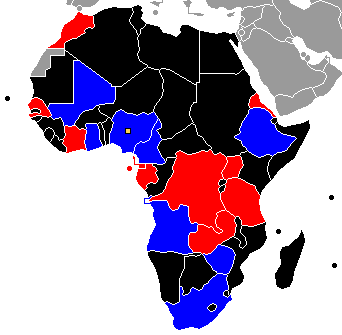
Qualified Did not qualify Did not enter or withdrew Not part of CAF

Ethiopia and Mali made their first appearances in the tournament.

Team	Qualified as	Qualified on	Previous tournament appearances (Note: Bold indicates champions for that year. Italic indicates hosts for that year.)
Nigeria	Hosts and defending champions	19 March 2002	4 (**1991**, **1995**, **1998**, **2000**)
Angola	Winners against DR Congo	11 October 2002	1 (1995)
Mali	Winners against Morocco	11 October 2002	Debut
South Africa	Winners against Zambia	12 October 2002	3 (1995, 1998, 2000)
Cameroon	Winners against Gabon	12 October 2002	3 (1991, 1998, 2000)
Ghana	Winners against Senegal	12 October 2002	4 (1991, 1995, 1998, 2000)
Ethiopia	Winners against Uganda	13 October 2002	Debut
Zimbabwe	Winners against Tanzania	13 October 2002	1 (2000)

== Officials ==
The following referees were named for the tournament:

- (Cameroon) Ondo Akono
- (Republic of the Congo) Chimane Nombauli
- (Democratic Republic of the Congo) Mukulu Mbula
- (Ghana) Scholastica Tetteh
- (Nigeria) Bola Abidoye
- (Nigeria) Bolanle Sekiteri
- (Togo) Xonam Agboyi
- (Uganda) Catherine Adipo

== Format ==
The eight teams were divided into two groups of four teams, where the top two teams in each group advanced to the semi-finals. The finalists of this edition of the tournament qualified for the 2003 FIFA Women's World Cup in the United States.

The teams were ranked according to the three points for a win standard.

== Group stage ==
=== Tiebreakers ===
If two or more teams in the group stage are tied on points tie-breakers are in order:

1. greater number of points in matches between tied teams
2. superior goal difference in matches between tied teams
3. greater number of goals scored in matches between tied teams
4. superior goal difference in all group matches
5. greater number of goals scored in all group matches
6. fair play criteria based on red and yellow cards received
7. drawing of lots

=== Group A ===
Pos	Team	Pld	W	D	L	GF	GA	GD	Pts	Qualification
1	Ghana	3	3	0	0	6	0	+6	9	Advance to knockout stage
2	Nigeria (H)	3	2	0	1	8	2	+6	6	Advance to knockout stage
3	Mali	3	0	1	2	3	9	−6	1 (Note: Tied on head-to-head points and overall goal difference. goals scored: Mali 3, Ethiopia 2.)	
4	Ethiopia	3	0	1	2	2	8	−6	1	

Rules for classification: Group stage tiebreakers
(H) Hosts
Notes:
7 December 2002

Nigeria	3–0	Ethiopia
Mbachu 15'; Akide 63', 66'

Warri Township Stadium, Warri
Referee: Chimane Nombauli (Congo)
7 December 2002

Mali	0–2	Ghana
		Sackey 55'; Dgajmah 78'

Warri Township Stadium, Warri
Referee: Xonam Agboyi (Togo)

10 December 2002

Ethiopia	2–2	Mali
Endegene-Leme 61', 70'		Konaté 20'; Samake 44'

Warri Township Stadium, Warri
Referee: Mukulu Mbula (DR Congo)
10 December 2002

Nigeria	0–1	Ghana
		Sackey 33'

Warri Township Stadium, Warri
Referee: Ondo Akono (Cameroon)

13 December 2002

Nigeria	5–1	Mali
Akide 38'; Nkwocha 40', 70'; Iweta 49'; Chiejine 82'		Samake 60'

Warri Township Stadium, Warri
Referee: Xonam Agboyi (Togo)
13 December 2002

Ghana	3–0	Ethiopia
Sackey 30', 60'; Gyamfuah 75'

Oghara Township Stadium, Oghara
Referee: Chimane Nombauli (Congo)

=== Group B ===
Pos	Team	Pld	W	D	L	GF	GA	GD	Pts	Qualification
1	South Africa	3	2	1	0	6	3	+3	7	Advance to knockout stage
2	Cameroon	3	1	1	1	2	2	0	4	Advance to knockout stage
3	Angola	3	0	2	1	2	3	−1	2 (Note: Tied on head-to-head points. Overall goal difference: Angola −1, Zimbabwe −2.)	
4	Zimbabwe	3	0	2	1	2	4	−2	2	

Rules for classification: Group stage tiebreakers
Notes:
8 December 2002

South Africa	2–1	Cameroon
Phewa 70'; Carelse 71'		Anounga 72'

Oghara Township Stadium, Oghara
Referee: Bola Abidoye (Nigeria)
8 December 2002

Angola	1–1	Zimbabwe
Gonçalves 16'		Talent 48'

Oghara Township Stadium, Oghara
Referee: Bolanle Sekiteri (Nigeria)

11 December 2002

Cameroon	0–0	Zimbabwe

Oghara Township Stadium, Oghara
Referee: Scholastica Tetteh (Ghana)
11 December 2002

South Africa	1–1	Angola
Monyepao 9'		Ramos 75'

Oghara Township Stadium, Oghara
Referee: Constance Adipo (Uganda)

14 December 2002

Cameroon	1–0	Angola
Ngono Mani 89'

Oghara Township Stadium, Oghara
Referee: Scholastica Tetteh (Ghana)
14 December 2002

South Africa	3–1	Zimbabwe
Phewa 27', 33', 61'		Talent 50'

Warri Township Stadium, Warri
Referee: Bola Abidoye (Nigeria)

== Knockout stage ==
In the knockout stage, if a match is level at the end of normal playing time, extra time is played (two periods of 15 minutes each) and followed, if necessary, by kicks from the penalty mark to determine the winner, except for the third place match where no extra time is played.

=== Bracket ===
Semi-finals
17 December - Warri
Ghana	3
Cameroon	2
18 December - Warri
South Africa	0
Nigeria	5

Final
20 December - Warri
Ghana	0
Nigeria	2
Third place play-off
20 December - Warri
Cameroon	3
South Africa	0

=== Semi-finals ===
Winners qualified for the 2003 FIFA Women's World Cup.

17 December 2002

Ghana	3–2 (a.e.t./g.g.)	Cameroon
Dgajmah 2'; Gyamfuah 75'; Bayor 120'		Pokam 83'; Belemgoto 90' (pen.)

Warri Township Stadium, Warri
Attendance: 10,000
Referee: Constance Adipo (Uganda)

18 December 2002

South Africa	0–5	Nigeria
		Yusuf 31'; Chiejine 47'; Mbachu 56', 81'; Nkwocha 69'

Warri Township Stadium, Warri
Referee: Chimane Nombauli (Congo)

=== Third place play-off ===
20 December 2002

Cameroon	3–0	South Africa

Warri Township Stadium, Warri

=== Final ===
20 December 2002

Ghana	0–2	Nigeria
		Nkwocha 25'; 75' Effionwan

Warri Township Stadium, Warri
Referee: Xonam Agboyi (Togo)

The match was held up for about 5 minutes after fans pelted a lineswoman with sachets of water after Alberta Sackey had not been given offside (but missed the chance anyway).

== Awards ==
2002 African Women's Championship

Nigeria
5th title

== Statistics ==
=== Team statistics ===
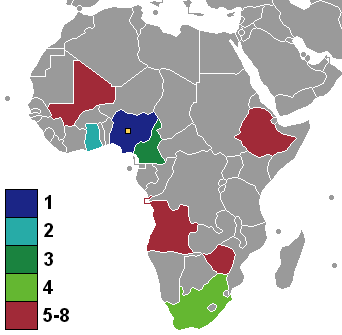
Champion Runner-up Third place Fourth place Group stage

Pos	Team	Pld	W	D	L	GF	GA	GD	Pts
1	Nigeria	5	4	0	1	15	2	+13	12
2	Ghana	5	4	0	1	9	4	+5	12
3	Cameroon	5	2	1	2	7	5	+2	7
4	South Africa	5	2	1	2	6	11	–5	7
Eliminated in the group stage
5	Angola	3	0	2	1	2	3	–1	2
6	Zimbabwe	3	0	2	1	2	4	–2	2
7	Mali	3	0	1	2	3	9	–6	1
8	Ethiopia	3	0	1	2	2	8	–6	1

=== Goalscorers ===
4 goals

- (Ghana) Alberta Sackey
- (Nigeria) Perpetua Nkwocha
- (South Africa) Veronica Phewa

3 goals

- (Nigeria) Mercy Akide
- (Nigeria) Stella Mbachu

2 goals

- (Ethiopia) Awasso Endegene-Leme
- (Ghana) Mavis Dgajmah
- (Ghana) Nana Gyamfuah
- (Mali) Rokiatou Samake
- (Nigeria) Ifenyichukwu Chiejine
- (Zimbabwe) Esther Zulu Talent

1 goal

- (Angola) Irene Gonçalves
- (Angola) Jacinta Rios
- (Cameroon) Antoinette Anounga
- (Cameroon) Rolande Belemgoto
- (Cameroon) Christelle Pokam
- (Cameroon) Madeleine Ngono Mani
- (Ghana) Adjoa Bayor
- (Mali) Maïchata Konaté
- (Nigeria) Ekpo Effionwan
- (Nigeria) Florence Iweta
- (Nigeria) Olaitan Yusuf
- (South Africa) Antonia Carelse
- (South Africa) Lydia Monyepao

Unknown goalscorers

- Cameroon: 3 additional goals

== Qualified teams for the 2003 FIFA Women's World Cup ==
The teams below qualified to represent Africa at the 2003 FIFA Women's World Cup in the United States.

Team	Qualified on	Previous tournament appearances (Note: Bold indicates champions for that year, whiles Italic indicates hosts for that year.)
Ghana	17 December 2002	1 (1999)
Nigeria	18 December 2002	3 (1991, 1995, 1999)
