= 2000 African Women's Championship =

4th edition of WAFCON

Tournament details
- Host country: South Africa
- Dates: 11 – 25 November
- Teams: 8
- Venues: 2 (in 2 host cities)

Final positions
- Champions: Nigeria (4th title)
- Runners-up: South Africa
- Third place: Ghana
- Fourth place: Zimbabwe

Tournament statistics
- Matches played: 16
- Goals scored: 60 (3.75 per match)
- Top scorer: (Nigeria) Mercy Akide (7 goals)

The 2000 African Women's Championship was the 4th edition of the biennial African women's association football tournament organized by Confederation of African Football and the second to be hosted by a country. It was held in South Africa between 11 and 25 November 2000.

Nigeria won their 4th title, beating South Africa 2–0 in a final which got abandoned at the 73rd minute.

== Qualification ==
South Africa as hosts and Nigeria as title holders qualified automatically, while the remaining six spots were determined by the qualification rounds which took place between June and August 2000.

=== Format ===
Qualification took place on a home-and-away two-legged basis. If aggregate scores were tied after the second leg, the away goals rule would apply, even adding the penalty shoot-out if scores were still level. No extra time period was used.

The six winners of the qualification round qualified for the group stage.

==== Preliminary round ====
Team 1	Agg.	Team 2	1st leg	2nd leg
Réunion	w/o (Note: Réunion advanced to the qualification round after Kenya withdrew.)	Kenya	—	—

24 June 2000

Réunion (Note: Réunion won by default and qualified for the qualification round.)	Cancelled	Kenya

Réunion

==== Qualification round ====
Team 1	Agg.	Team 2	1st leg	2nd leg
Réunion	5–4	Egypt	4–3	1–1
Gabon	w/o (Note: Gabon failed to show for the second leg.)	Cameroon	0–3	—
Morocco	6–1	Algeria	3–0	3–1
Zimbabwe	8–0	Lesotho	4–0	4–0
Sierra Leone	w/o (Note: DR Congo withdrew.)	Ghana	—	—
Uganda	w/o (Note: Sierra Leone withdrew.)	DR Congo	—	—

Notes

First leg on 29–30 July; Second leg on 11–13 August.

30 July 2000

Réunion	4–3	Egypt

Saint Paul
11 August 2000

Egypt	1–1	Réunion

Alexandria

Réunion won 5–4 on aggregate and qualified for the group stage.

29 July 2000

Gabon	0–3	Cameroon

Libreville
11–13 August 2000

Cameroon	Cancelled	Gabon

Cameroon won by default and qualified for the group stage after Gabon failed to show up for the second leg.

30 July 2000

Morocco	3–0	Algeria
El Jazouli 5'; El Amrani 47'; Najeh 86'	Report

El Jadida
12 August 2000

Algeria	1–3	Morocco

Algiers

Morocco won 6–1 on aggregate and qualified for the group stage.

30 July 2000

Zimbabwe	4–0	Lesotho
Moyo	Report

Rufaro Stadium, Harare
13 August 2000

Lesotho	0–4	Zimbabwe

Maseru

Zimbabwe won 8–0 on aggregate and qualified for the group stage.

29–30 July 2000

Sierra Leone	Cancelled	Ghana

Ghana won by default and qualified for the group stage.

29–30 July 2000

Uganda	Cancelled	DR Congo

Uganda won by default and qualified for the group stage.

=== Qualified teams ===
Réunion, Uganda and Zimbabwe made their tournament debut at this edition. Zimbabwe originally entered this tournament's inaugural edition, but withdrew before playing any match.

Team	Appearance	Previous best appearance
Cameroon	3rd	Runners-up (1991)
Ghana	4th	Runners-up (1998)
Morocco	2nd	Group stage (1998)
Nigeria	4th	Champions (1991, 1995, 1998)
Réunion	1st	Debut
South Africa (hosts)	3rd	Runners-up (1995)
Uganda	1st	Debut
Zimbabwe	1st	Debut

== Match officials ==
=== Referees ===
The following referees were named for this edition of the tournament:

- (Cameroon) Ondo Akono
- (Ghana) Scholastica Tetteh
- (Madagascar) Justine Rasoanirina
- (Nigeria) Bola Abidoye
- (Nigeria) Bolanle Sekiteri
- (Senegal) Fatou Gaye
- (Uganda) Catherine Adipo
- (Zimbabwe) Sabelo Sibindi

== Group stage ==
=== Tiebreakers ===
If two or more teams in the group stage are tied on points tie-breakers are in order:

1. greater number of points in matches between tied teams
2. superior goal difference in matches between tied teams
3. greater number of goals scored in matches between tied teams
4. superior goal difference in all group matches
5. greater number of goals scored in all group matches
6. fair play criteria based on red and yellow cards received
7. drawing of lots

=== Group A ===
Pos	Team	Pld	W	D	L	GF	GA	GD	Pts	Qualification
1	South Africa (H)	3	3	0	0	8	1	+7	9	Advance to knockout stage
2	Zimbabwe	3	1	1	1	5	5	0	4 (Note: Tied on head-to-head points. Overall goal difference: Zimbabwe 0, Uganda −2.)	Advance to knockout stage
3	Uganda	3	1	1	1	4	6	−2	4	
4	Réunion	3	0	0	3	2	7	−5	0	

Rules for classification: Group stage tiebreakers
(H) Hosts
Notes:
11 November 2000

South Africa	3–0	Réunion
Phewa 33'; Ellis 55'; Malaku 69'

Boksburg, South Africa
Referee: Bola Abidoye(Nigeria)
11 November 2000

Zimbabwe	2–2	Uganda
Mathobela 26'; Moyo 79'		Nakawagi 21'; Nakintu 30'

Boksburg, South Africa
Referee: Bolanle Sekiteri (Nigeria)

14 November 2000

Zimbabwe	2–1	Réunion
Mpala 57'; Mutero 82'		Mussard 18'

Boksburg, South Africa
Referee: Ondo Akono (Cameroon)
14 November 2000

South Africa	3–0	Uganda
Solomon 27'; Luthuli 32'; Lekalakala 51'

Boksburg, South Africa
Referee: Scholastica Tetteh (Ghana)

17 November 2000

Uganda	2–1	Réunion
Nakimbugwe 42'; Mbekeka 89'		Lecoutre 29'

Johannesburg, South Africa
Referee: Bola Abidoye (Nigeria)
17 November 2000

South Africa	2–1	Zimbabwe
Luthili 49'; Phewa 65'		Mpala 44'

Boksburg, South Africa
Referee: Ondo Akono (Cameroon)

=== Group B ===
Pos	Team	Pld	W	D	L	GF	GA	GD	Pts	Qualification
1	Nigeria	3	2	1	0	11	2	+9	7 (Note: Tied on head-to-head points. Overall goal difference: Nigeria +9, Ghana +5.)	Advance to knockout stage
2	Ghana	3	2	1	0	7	2	+5	7	Advance to knockout stage
3	Cameroon	3	1	0	2	4	6	−2	3	
4	Morocco	3	0	0	3	1	13	−12	0	

Rules for classification: Group stage tiebreakers
Notes:
12 November 2000

Nigeria	2–2	Ghana
Akide 40', 50'		Baidu 52'; Okine 80'

Johannesburg, South Africa
Referee: Fatou Gaye (Senegal)
12 November 2000

Cameroon	4–1	Morocco
Eko Njolle 17'; Anounga 67'; Enama Abbe 89'; Anong 90'		Maqdi 13'

Boksburg, South Africa
Referee: Sabelo Sibindi (Zimbabwe)

15 November 2000

Ghana	2–0	Cameroon
Sackey 7'; Dgajmah 82'

Johannesburg, South Africa
Referee: Justine Rasoanirina (Madagascar)
15 November 2000

Nigeria	6–0	Morocco
Akide 44', 73'; Ajayi 49', 70'; Mmadu; Nwadike 90+2'

Boksburg, South Africa
Referee: Catherine Adipo (Uganda)

18 November 2000

Ghana	3–0	Morocco
Baidu 65'; Bayor 66'; Gyamfuah 70'

Johannesburg, South Africa
Referee: Sabelo Sibindi (Zimbabwe)
18 November 2000

Nigeria	3–0	Cameroon
Akide 14'; Yusuf 35'; Mmadu 90'

Boksburg, South Africa
Referee: Fatou Gaye (Senegal)

== Knockout stage ==
A match at the third-place match with a levelled score at the end of 90 minutes would go to an extra time of 30 minutes is played and followed by a penalty shoot-out if necessary.

=== Bracket ===
Semi-finals
21 November - Boksburg
South Africa	1
Ghana	0
21 November - Johannesburg
Nigeria	6
Zimbabwe	0

Final
25 November - Boksburg
Nigeria	2
South Africa	0
Third place play-off
24 November - Boksburg
Ghana	6
Zimbabwe	3

=== Semi-finals ===
21 November 2000

South Africa	1–0	Ghana
Solomon 9'

Boksburg, South Africa
Referee: Fatou Gaye (Senegal)

21 November 2000

Nigeria	6–0	Zimbabwe
Yusuf 3'; Mmadu 34'; Akide 40', 65'; Nwadike 52'; Ajayi 79'

Johannesburg, South Africa
Referee: Catherine Adipo (Uganda)

=== Third place play-off ===
24 November 2000

Ghana	6–3	Zimbabwe
Baidu 1'; Bayor 6', 31'; Darku 24'; Foriwaa 35'; Dgajmah 44'		14' Mpala; 16' Moyo; 61' Nyerukai

Boksburg, South Africa
Referee: Justine Rasoanirina (Madagascar)

=== Final ===
25 November 2000

Nigeria	2–0 ^{1}	South Africa
Yusuf 30'; Mbachu 72'

Boksburg, South Africa
Referee: Ondo Akono (Cameroon)

^{1} The match was abandoned in the 73rd minute with Nigeria leading 2–0 after fans started throwing objects at the referee following the second goal, with riot police arriving 40 minutes later and firing tear gas in the crowds; fans needed hospital treatment and cars belonging to journalists were attacked as they were leaving the stadium. The result stood as final.

== Awards ==
2000 African Women's Championship winners

Nigeria
4th title

== Statistics ==
=== Team statistics ===
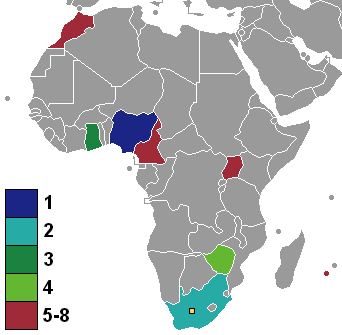
Champion Runner-up Third place Fourth place Group stage

Pos	Team	Pld	W	D	L	GF	GA	GD	Pts
1	Nigeria	5	4	1	0	19	2	+17	13
2	South Africa	5	4	0	1	9	3	+6	12
3	Ghana	5	3	1	1	13	6	+7	10
4	Zimbabwe	5	1	1	3	8	17	–9	4
Eliminated in the group stage
5	Uganda	3	1	1	1	4	6	–2	4
6	Cameroon	3	1	0	2	4	6	–2	3
7	Réunion	3	0	0	3	2	7	–5	0
8	Morocco	3	0	0	3	1	13	–12	0

=== Goalscorers ===
7 goals

- (Nigeria) Mercy Akide

3 goals

- (Ghana) Elizabeth Baidu
- (Ghana) Adjoa Bayor
- (Nigeria) Kikelomo Ajayi
- (Nigeria) Maureen Mmadu
- (Nigeria) Olaitan Yusuf
- (Zimbabwe) Precious Mpala

2 goals

- (Ghana) Mavis Dgajmah
- (Nigeria) Rita Nwadike
- (South Africa) Makhosi Luthuli
- (South Africa) Veronica Phewa
- (South Africa) Joanne Solomon
- (Zimbabwe) Nomsa Moyo

1 goal

- (Cameroon) Bernadette Anong
- (Cameroon) Antoinette Anounga
- (Cameroon) Lydienne Eko Njolle
- (Cameroon) Desire Enama Abbe
- (Ghana) Memuna Darku
- (Ghana) Gloria Foriwaa
- (Ghana) Nana Gyamfuah
- (Ghana) Sheila Okine
- (Ghana) Alberta Sackey
- (Morocco) Nadia Maqdi
- (Nigeria) Stella Mbachu
- (Réunion) Rachelle Lecoutre
- (Réunion) Florence Mussard
- (South Africa) Desiree Ellis
- (South Africa) Hilda Lekalakala
- (South Africa) Martha Malaku
- (Uganda) Oliver Mbekeka
- (Uganda) Alaisa Nakawagi
- (Uganda) Annet Nakimbugwe
- (Uganda) Robina Nakintu
- (Zimbabwe) Thandekile Mathobela
- (Zimbabwe) Yesmore Mutero
- (Zimbabwe) Florence Nyerukai
