= Yesmore Mutero =

Zimbabwean footballer

Personal information
- Date of birth: 1979 or 1980
- Date of death: 28 March 2005 (aged 25)
- Position: Forward

International career
Years	Team	Apps	(Gls)
- Zimbabwe

Yesmore Mutero (1979 or 1980 – 28 March 2005) was a Zimbabwean footballer who played as a forward. She has been a member of the Zimbabwe women's national team.

== International career ==
Mutero capped for Zimbabwe at senior level during the 2000 African Women's Championship.

=== International goals ===
Scores and results list Zimbabwe goal tally first

No.	Date	Venue	Opponent	Score	Result	Competition
1	14 November 2000	Boksburg, South Africa	Réunion	2–1	2–1	2000 African Women's Championship

== Death ==
Mutero died of an AIDS-related illness on 28 March 2005. She was 25 years old.
