= Precious Mpala =

Zimbabwean footballer

Personal information
- Position: Midfielder

International career
Years	Team	Apps	(Gls)
- Zimbabwe

Precious Mpala is a Zimbabwean former footballer who played as a midfielder. Nicknamed Gringo, she has been a member of the Zimbabwe women's national team.

== International career ==
Mpala capped for Zimbabwe at senior level during the 2000 African Women's Championship.

=== International goals ===
Scores and results list Zimbabwe goal tally first

No.	Date	Venue	Opponent	Score	Result	Competition
1	14 November 2000	Boksburg, South Africa	Réunion	1–1	2–1	2000 African Women's Championship
2	17 November 2000	Boksburg, South Africa	South Africa	1–0	1–2	2000 African Women's Championship
3	24 November 2000	Boksburg, South Africa	Ghana	1–2	3–6	2000 African Women's Championship
4	21 September 2002	Dar es Salaam, Tanzania	Tanzania	1–0	5–0	2002 African Women's Championship qualification
5	13 October 2002	Harare, Zimbabwe	Tanzania	3–0	5–0	2002 African Women's Championship qualification
