= Perpetua Nkwocha =

Nigerian footballer

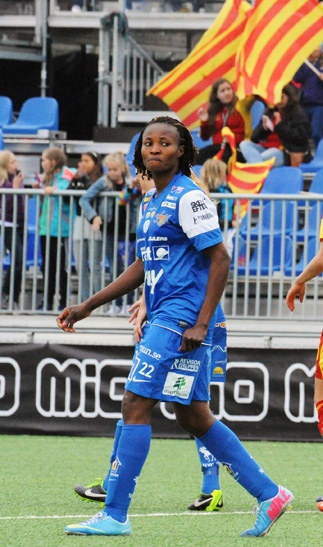
- Nwocha in May 2013

Personal information
- Full name: Perpetua Ijeoma Nkwocha
- Date of birth: 3 January 1976 (age 50)
- Height: 1.80 m (5 ft 11 in)
- Position: Midfielder

Team information
- Current team: Clemensnäs IF (coach)

Senior career*
Years	Team	Apps	(Gls)
2007–2014	Sunnanå SK	139	(65)

International career^{‡}
1999–2015	Nigeria	99	(80)

Managerial career
- 2015–: Clemensnäs IF
- * Club domestic league appearances and goals as of 16:41, 29 June 2015 (UTC); **From 2008–2014 ‡ National team caps and goals as of 15:56, 17 June 2015 (UTC)

Perpetua Ijeoma Nkwocha // (born 3 January 1976) is a Nigerian former professional footballer who played for and captained the Nigeria women's national football team. She is the coach of Clemensnäs IF from Swedish Women's Football Division 2. She previously played for Swedish club Sunnanå SK.

== Club career ==
She played for Swedish side Sunnanå SK in both the top division (Damallsvenskan) and the second division (Elitettan) leagues from 2007 until 2014.

In June 2008, the BBC reported that Nkwocha had announced her plans to retire in two years, and that after doing so she wants to continue to be involved in football by becoming a coach. As of 2012 she was still playing in Sweden's second-tier league.

Ahead of the 2015 season, 39-year-old Nkwocha left Sunnanå to join lower division (4th tier) Clemensnäs IF in a player-coach role. She spent part of the previous season coaching boys' football in Nigeria, but wanted to settle in Sweden after taking Swedish citizenship.

== International career ==
With the Nigeria national team Nkwocha has participated in seven CAF Women's Championship editions (2002, 2004, 2006, 2008, 2010, 2012 and 2014), winning five of them (2002, 2004, 2006, 2010 and 2014). At the 2004 African Women's Championship, she scored four goals in the final against Cameroon to help her country win the title. She also set a record by scoring nine overall goals during the tournament, and was named the best player of the tournament. Nkwocha was voted African Women's Footballer of the Year in 2004, 2005, 2010 and 2011 by Confederation of African Football (CAF).

Nkwocha has also participated in four FIFA Women's World Cup (2003, 2007, 2011 and 2015), as well as the Olympic tournaments of Sydney 2000, Athens 2004, and Beijing 2008

== Personal life ==
Nkwocha is in partnership with former Turkey based Çanakkale Dardanelspor professional striker and now by Piteå IF playing Ghanaian footballer Justice Tetteh Komey.

== Honours ==
Nigeria

- African Women's Championship: 2002, 2004, 2006, 2010, 2014

Individual

- African Women's Footballer of the Year: 2004, 2005, 2010, 2011
- African Women's Championship Top goalscorer: 2004, 2006, 2010
- IFFHS All-time Africa Women's Dream Team: 2021

== Career statistics ==
Scores and results list Nigeria goal tally first, score column indicates score after each Nkwocha goal.

List of international goals scored by Perpetua Nkwocha
No.	Date	Venue	Opponent	Score	Result	Competition
1	14 September 2000	Canberra, Australia	China	1–3	1–3	2000 Summer Olympics
2	13 December 2002	Warri, Nigeria	Mali	2–0	5–1	2002 African Women's Championship
3	13 December 2002	Warri, Nigeria	Mali	4–1	5–1	2002 African Women's Championship
4	18 December 2002	Warri, Nigeria	South Africa	4–0	5–0	2002 African Women's Championship
5	20 December 2002	Warri, Nigeria	Ghana	1–0	2–0	2002 African Women's Championship
6	12 March 2004	South Africa	South Africa	2–0	2–2	2004 Summer Olympics qualification
7	22 April 2004	Reading, England	England	2–0	3–0	Friendly
8	22 April 2004	Reading, England	England	3–0	3–0	Friendly
9	19 September 2004	Germiston, South Africa	Algeria	3–0	4–0	2004 African Women's Championship
10	22 September 2004	Germiston, South Africa	Cameroon	1–0	2–2	2004 African Women's Championship
11	25 September 2004	Pretoria, South Africa	Mali	2–0	3–0	2004 African Women's Championship
12	25 September 2004	Pretoria, South Africa	Mali	3–0	3–0	2004 African Women's Championship
13	28 September 2004	Johannesburg, South Africa	Ethiopia	4–0	4–0	2004 African Women's Championship
14	3 October 2004	Johannesburg, South Africa	Cameroon	1–0	5–0	2004 African Women's Championship
15	3 October 2004	Johannesburg, South Africa	Cameroon	2–0	5–0	2004 African Women's Championship
16	3 October 2004	Johannesburg, South Africa	Cameroon	3–0	5–0	2004 African Women's Championship
17	3 October 2004	Johannesburg, South Africa	Cameroon	4–0	5–0	2004 African Women's Championship
18	28 October 2006	Oleh, Nigeria	Equatorial Guinea	3–2	4–2	2006 African Women's Championship
19	31 October 2006	Warri, Nigeria	Algeria	2–0	6–0	2006 African Women's Championship
20	31 October 2006	Warri, Nigeria	Algeria	6–0	6–0	2006 African Women's Championship
21	7 November 2006	Warri, Nigeria	Cameroon	2–0	5–0	2006 African Women's Championship
22	7 November 2006	Warri, Nigeria	Cameroon	3–0	5–0	2006 African Women's Championship
23	7 November 2006	Warri, Nigeria	Cameroon	4–0	5–0	2006 African Women's Championship
24	11 November 2006	Warri, Nigeria	Ghana	1–0	1–0	2006 African Women's Championship
25	22 July 2007	Algiers, Algeria	South Africa	3–0	4–0	2007 All-Africa Games
26	12 August 2008	Beijing, China	Brazil	1–0	1–3	2008 Summer Olympics
27	1 November 2010	Daveyton, South Africa	Mali	1–0	5–0	2010 African Women's Championship
28	1 November 2010	Daveyton, South Africa	Mali	2–0	5–0	2010 African Women's Championship
29	1 November 2010	Daveyton, South Africa	Mali	3–0	5–0	2010 African Women's Championship
30	4 November 2010	Daveyton, South Africa	South Africa	1–0	2–1	2010 African Women's Championship
31	4 November 2010	Daveyton, South Africa	South Africa	2–0	2–1	2010 African Women's Championship
32	7 November 2010	Daveyton, South Africa	Tanzania	1–0	3–0	2010 African Women's Championship
33	7 November 2010	Daveyton, South Africa	Tanzania	2–0	3–0	2010 African Women's Championship
34	11 November 2010	Daveyton, South Africa	Cameroon	3–1	5–1	2010 African Women's Championship
35	11 November 2010	Daveyton, South Africa	Cameroon	4–1	5–1	2010 African Women's Championship
36	11 November 2010	Daveyton, South Africa	Cameroon	5–1	5–1	2010 African Women's Championship
37	14 November 2010	Daveyton, South Africa	Equatorial Guinea	1–0	4–2	2010 African Women's Championship
38	5 July 2011	Dresden, Germany	Canada	1–0	1–0	2011 FIFA Women's World Cup
39	16 June 2012	Lagos, Nigeria	Zimbabwe	1–0	4–0	2012 African Women's Championship qualification
40	29 October 2012	Bata, Equatorial Guinea	Cameroon	2–1	2–1	2012 African Women's Championship
41	1 November 2012	Bata, Equatorial Guinea	Ethiopia	3–0	3–0	2012 African Women's Championship
42	14 October 2014	Windhoek, Namibia	Zambia	6–0	6–0	2014 African Women's Championship

Awards
Preceded by Adjoa Bayor^{1}	African Women Player of the Year; 2004–2005	Succeeded by Cynthia Uwak^{2,3}
Notes and references
1. https://www.rsssf.org/miscellaneous/afr-wpoy.html; 2=http://www.sundayworld.co.za/swzones/sundayworldNEW/sport/sport1190617583.asp; 3=http://sports.tbo.com/sports/MGBHFW7DE6F.html
