= Catherine Adipo =

Ugandan sportswoman

Catherine Adipo (also referred to as Catherine Constance Adipo and Catherine Adipo Wejuli) is a Ugandan sportswoman, sports administrator and the first female FIFA referee in Uganda as well as East and Central Africa.

== Background and education ==
Adipo is one of 16 children born to the late Reverend Canon Kezironi Wejuli and Abisiagi Wejuli.

Adipo attended Busia Integrated School, Mt.St.Mary's College, Namagunga and King's College Budo. She graduated from Makerere University with a Bachelor of Arts Degree in Geography and Languages in 1987. She also holds a Post Graduate Diploma in Education still from Makerere University and a Master's degree in Sports science from Kyambogo University.

== Career ==
=== Playing career ===
- Featured as a centre for local volleyball club Kampala Amateur Volleyball Club (KAVC)
- 1982 – national ladies team captain (volleyball)

=== Professional career ===
- 1988 – games mistress and football coach, Makerere College School
- 1989 – undergoes referee training and joins Uganda Referees Association
- 1995 – attains FIFA badge thus becoming first woman FIFA referee in Uganda
- 1991–1997 – sports officer, Kampala City Council
- 2005 – lecturer, physical science, Kyambogo University
- 2006–present – FIFA/CAF Instructor
- 2015 – FUFA Referees Standing Committee vice chairperson

== Notable achievements and appearances ==
- 1995 – first Ugandan woman FIFA referee
- 2000 – referee, 2000 African Women's Championship, South Africa
- 2002 – referee, 2002 African Women's Championship, Nigeria
- 2003 – centre referee, CAF second round, women Olympic football qualifier between Angola and Zimbabwe
- 2004 – referee, 2004 African Women's Championship, South Africa

== Controversy ==
In 2011, it was alleged that while still a lecturer at Kyambogo University, Adipo had travelled to China on a Uganda Olympics Committee ticket to represent the organisation yet she was not a member of the said organisation.

== Personal life ==
Adipo is married and has 2 children

== See also ==
- Uganda women's national football team.
- Football in Uganda.
- Faridah Bulega.
- Flavia Oketcho.
