= List of Africa Cup of Nations hat-tricks =

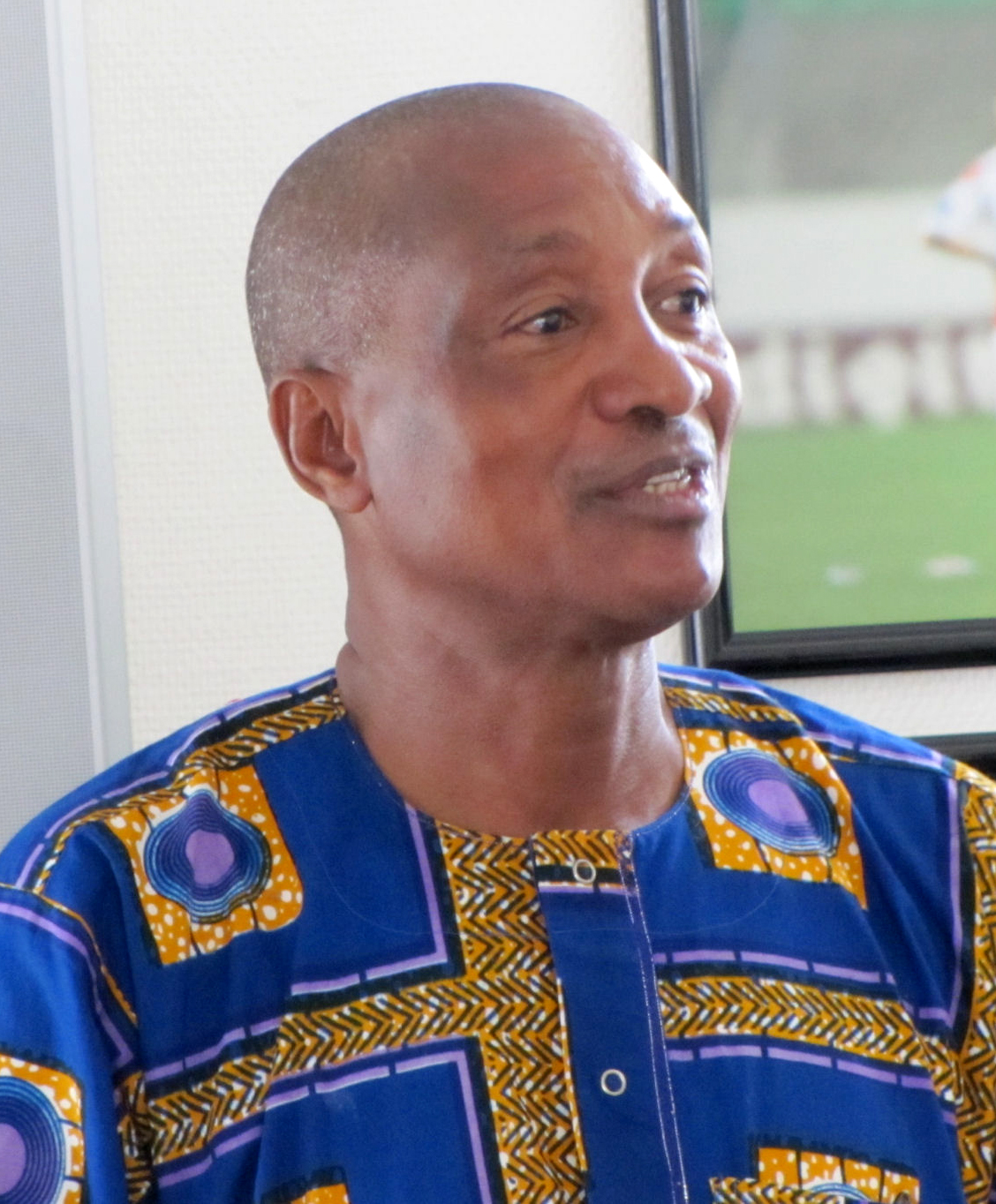
Laurent Pokou of Ivory Coast is the only player to score a hat-trick of five goals in Africa Cup of Nations (1970)

This is a list of hat-tricks in the Africa Cup of Nations, that being when a player scores three or more goals in a tournament match of the Africa Cup of Nations (not including Africa Cup of Nations qualification matches). Hat-tricks have occurred 17 times across the 35 editions.

== Hat-tricks ==
=== Notable Africa Cup of Nations hat-tricks ===
- Ad-Diba of Egypt is the first ever player to score a hat-trick in Africa Cup of Nations in 1957; in the inaugural tournament's final. He is the only player to score a hat-trick in an Africa Cup of Nations final.
- Mahmoud El-Gohary of United Arab Republic is the first and only player to score a hat-trick in an opening match of Africa Cup of Nations in a 4–0 victory against Ethiopia on the 22 May 1959.
- Hassan El-Shazly of United Arab Republic is the only player to score a hat-trick in two Africa Cup of Nations (1963 and 1970).
- Laurent Pokou of Ivory Coast is the only player to score a hat-trick of five goals in Africa Cup of Nations (1970).
- The fastest hat-trick was scored by Soufiane Alloudi of Morocco against Namibia in 2008, (1', 5', 28) in their 5–1 victory.
- The latest hat-trick without extra time was scored by Francileudo dos Santos of Tunisia against Zambia in 2006, (35', 82', 90+3') in their 4–1 victory.
- The latest hat-trick in extra time was scored by Bernard Chanda of Zambia against Congo-Brazzaville in the semi-final of 1974, (70', 97', 111') in their 4–2 victory.
- The shortest hat-trick was scored by Benedict McCarthy of South Africa against Namibia in 1998, in the span of 14 minutes; (8', 11', 19', 21') in their 4–1 victory.
- The slowest hat-trick was scored by Laurent Pokou of Ivory Coast against Ethiopia in 1970, in the span of 67 minutes; (21', 60', 71', 80', 87') in their 6–1 victory.
- The longest hat-trick was scored by Ad-Diba of Egypt against Ethiopia in 1957, in the span of 88 minutes; (2', 7', 68', 89') in their 4–0 victory; in the inaugural tournament's final.
- Every player that has scored a hat trick in a match during the tournament has won the match.
- 1963; 1970; 1998 and 2006 are the only tournaments to have more than one hat-trick, with two each.
- On more than 15 occasions there were no hat-tricks scored in a tournament.
- There has been one occasion when two hat-tricks have been scored in the same match: when United Arab Republic defeated Nigeria 6–3 in the group stage match of 1963; Egyptians Mohamed Morsi Hussein and Hassan El-Shazly scored three goals each.
- Egypt holds the record of most hat-tricks scored with 6.
- Ethiopia has conceded the most hat-tricks with 3 and conceded the most goals from hat-tricks with 12.

=== Hat-tricks ===
A hat-trick is achieved when the same player scores three or more goals in one match. Listed in chronological order.

| Sequence | Player | No. of goals | Time of goals | Representing | Final score | Opponent | Tournament | Round | Date |
|---|---|---|---|---|---|---|---|---|---|
| 1. | Ad-Diba | 4 | 2', 7', 68', 89' | Egypt | 4–0 | Ethiopia | 1957 | Final | 16 February 1957 |
| 2. | Mahmoud El-Gohary | 3 | 29', 42', 73' | United Arab Republic | 4–0 | Ethiopia | 1959 | Final tournament | 22 May 1959 |
| 3. | Mohamed Morsi Hussein | 3 | 30', 32', 82' | United Arab Republic | 6–3 | Nigeria | 1963 | Group stage | 24 November 1963 |
| 4. | Hassan El-Shazly | 3 | 42', 44', 81' | United Arab Republic | 6–3 | Nigeria | 1963 | Group stage | 24 November 1963 |
| 5. | Eustache Manglé | 3 | 14', 59', 80' | Ivory Coast | 3–0 | Congo-Léopoldville | 1965 | Group stage | 14 November 1965 |
| 6. | Hacène Lalmas | 3 | 15', 25', 70' | Algeria | 4–0 | Uganda | 1968 | Group stage | 14 January 1968 |
| 7. | Laurent Pokou | 5 | 21', 60', 71', 80', 87' | Ivory Coast | 6–1 | Ethiopia | 1970 | Group stage | 10 February 1970 |
| 8. | Hassan El-Shazly (II) | 3 | 3', 14', 50' | United Arab Republic | 3–1 | Ivory Coast | 1970 | Third place | 16 February 1970 |
| 9. | Bernard Chanda | 3 | 70', 97', 111' | Zambia | 4–2 | Congo-Brazzaville | 1974 | Semi-final | 9 March 1974 |
| 10. | Joël Tiéhi | 3 | 19', 63', 70' | Ivory Coast | 4–0 | Sierra Leone | 1994 | Group stage | 27 March 1994 |
| 11. | Kalusha Bwalya | 3 | 2', 9', 87' | Zambia | 4–0 | Sierra Leone | 1996 | Group stage | 24 January 1996 |
| 12. | Benedict McCarthy | 4 | 8', 11', 19', 21' | South Africa | 4–1 | Namibia | 1998 | Group stage | 16 February 1998 |
| 13. | Hossam Hassan | 3 | 34', 57', 71' | Egypt | 4–0 | Zambia | 1998 | Group stage | 13 February 1998 |
| 14. | Patrick Mboma | 3 | 31', 44', 65' | Cameroon | 5–3 | Zimbabwe | 2004 | Group stage | 29 January 2004 |
| 15. | Samuel Eto'o | 3 | 20', 39', 78' | Cameroon | 3–1 | Angola | 2006 | Group stage | 21 January 2006 |
| 16. | Francileudo dos Santos | 3 | 35', 82', 90+3' | Tunisia | 4–1 | Zambia | 2006 | Group stage | 22 January 2006 |
| 17. | Soufiane Alloudi | 3 | 1', 5', 28' | Morocco | 5–1 | Namibia | 2008 | Group stage | 21 January 2008 |
| 18. | Emilio Nsue | 3 | 21', 51', 61' | Equatorial Guinea | 4–2 | Guinea-Bissau | 2023 | Group stage | 18 January 2024 |

=== By nation ===
| Nation | Hat-tricks for | Hat-tricks against |
|---|---|---|
| Egypt | 6 | 0 |
| Ivory Coast | 3 | 1 |
| Cameroon | 2 | 0 |
| Zambia | 2 | 2 |
| Algeria | 1 | 0 |
| Morocco | 1 | 0 |
| South Africa | 1 | 0 |
| Tunisia | 1 | 0 |
| Equatorial Guinea | 1 | 0 |
| Ethiopia | 0 | 3 |
| Namibia | 0 | 2 |
| Nigeria | 0 | 2 |
| Sierra Leone | 0 | 2 |
| Angola | 0 | 1 |
| Congo-Brazzaville | 0 | 1 |
| Congo-Léopoldville | 0 | 1 |
| Guinea-Bissau | 0 | 1 |
| Uganda | 0 | 1 |
| Zimbabwe | 0 | 1 |

== See also ==
- List of hat-tricks
- List of Africa Women Cup of Nations hat-tricks
- List of African Nations Championship hat-tricks
