= Cynthia Uwak =

Nigerian footballer

Personal information
- Full name: Cynthia Uwak
- Date of birth: 15 July 1986 (age 40)
- Place of birth: Nigeria
- Height: 1.60 m (5 ft 3 in)
- Position: Striker

Team information
- Current team: Åland United
- Number: 18

Senior career*
Years	Team	Apps	(Gls)
2005	KMF		
2006	FC United		(17)
2007	Falköpings KIK		
2008	FC United		
2008–2009	Lyon		
2009	KMF	12	(18)
2009–2011	1. FC Saarbrücken	42	(12)
2011–2012	PK-35 Vantaa	29	(22)
2012–	Åland United	32	(22)

International career
2002	Nigeria U-19		
2004–	Nigeria		
Medal record
Women's Football
Representing Nigeria
African Championships
Gold medal – first place	2004 South Africa	Nigeria
Gold medal – first place	2006 Nigeria	Nigeria
- * Club domestic league appearances and goals as of 21 June 2014

Cynthia Uwak (born 15 July 1986 in Akwa Ibom State) is a Nigerian football striker who most recently played for Åland United in the Naisten Liiga in Finland.

== Early life ==
Cynthia Uwak's first experience of playing football was against boys in the streets of her hometown. She was supported by her mother to pursue football, and was able to combine playing with her secondary education.

== Football career ==
=== Club ===
Cynthia Uwak began her club career with Finnish women's side KMF, and has spent the majority of her club career in Scandinavia with the exception of a stint in France and Germany. She was part of the Olympique Lyonnais team that won the Division 1 Féminine title in France in 2009. After moving to Finnish side Åland United, she won a further Naisten Liiga title in 2013, and was the top goal scorer in the division.

=== International ===
She is a member of the Nigeria national football team. Uwak competed at the 2008 Summer Olympics and the 2007 FIFA Women's World Cup.

She missed out on the squad for the 2010 African Women's Championship in South Africa following an injury. The national coach Eucharia Uche said at the time that that would not automatically mean that she would be left out of the squad for the 2011 FIFA Women's World Cup the following year. However, when the World Cup squad was announced, Uwak was not listed. No specific reason was given for her omission, with a general statement saying, "The coach has strictly gone with players that are capable of doing the country proud at the World Cup in Germany".

She was considered for a return to the national team by coach Florence Omagbemi in 2016 for the Africa Women Cup of Nations in Cameroon. The coach was looking at a succession of former players in an effort to bolster the team's chances at the upcoming tournament.

== Personal life ==
Uwak has previously spoken out against the notion that all women involved in football are lesbians; "saying that female footballers are lesbians is rather pathetic. You can’t just label people based on assumptions."

== Honours ==
=== Club ===
- Division 1 Féminine (1): 2009
- Naisten Liiga (3): 2011, 2012, 2013

=== International ===
- African Women's Championship (2): 2004, 2006

=== Personal ===
- African Women Footballer of the Year (2): 2006, 2007
- Naisten Liiga top scorer (1): 2013
