= Colin Udoh =

Nigerian journalist & sports TV presenter

- Born: Port Harcourt
- Occupation: Media

Colin Udoh is a Nigerian journalist and sports television presenter.

Colin is currently working for Kwese Sports.

He has featured as a studio analyst for the Super Sport television network and has written for the African football magazine Kick Off. He worked for the Nigeria Football Federation as a media officer.

Udoh is married to the female Nigerian international football player Mercy Akide.

In an interview, he mentioned how working as the Nigerian national side's Media Officer was part fun, but part frustrating. Despite the frustrations, he said he wouldn't change the experience for anything.
