= African Women's Footballer of the Year =

Top women's football award in Africa

African Women Footballer of the Year, an annual award for Africa's best female football player. It is awarded by the Confederation of African Football (CAF) in December each year. Nigeria's Asisat Oshoala has won the award a record six times. The award was given out for the first time in 2001.

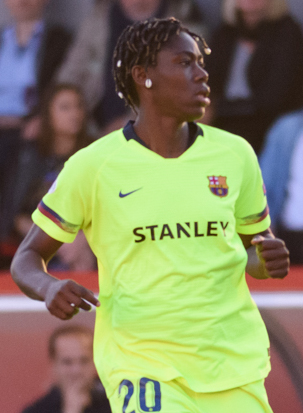
Record six time winner: Asisat Oshoala

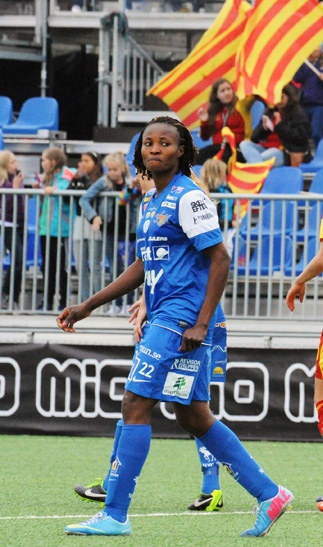
Four time winner: Perpetua Nkwocha

== Winners ==
Year	Player	Country
2025	Ghizlane Chebbak	Morocco
2024	Barbra Banda	Zambia
2023	Asisat Oshoala	Nigeria
2022	Asisat Oshoala	Nigeria
2021	not awarded	—
2020	not awarded	—
2019	Asisat Oshoala	Nigeria
2018	Thembi Kgatlana	South Africa
2017	Asisat Oshoala	Nigeria
2016	Asisat Oshoala	Nigeria
2015	Gaëlle Enganamouit	Cameroon
2014	Asisat Oshoala	Nigeria
2013	not awarded	—
2012	Genoveva Añonma	Equatorial Guinea
2011	Perpetua Nkwocha	Nigeria
2010	Perpetua Nkwocha	Nigeria
2009	not awarded	—
2008	Noko Matlou	South Africa
2007	Cynthia Uwak	Nigeria
2006	Cynthia Uwak	Nigeria
2005	Perpetua Nkwocha	Nigeria
2004	Perpetua Nkwocha	Nigeria
2003	Adjoa Bayor	Ghana
2002	Alberta Sackey	Ghana
2001	Mercy Akide	Nigeria

== Multiple winners ==
^{* Players in bold are currently active}

Player	Winner
**Asisat Oshoala**	6
Perpetua Nkwocha	4
Cynthia Uwak	2

== Awards won by nationality ==
Nation	Winners
Nigeria	13
Ghana	2
South Africa	2
Cameroon	1
Equatorial Guinea	1
Zambia	1
Morocco	1

== See also ==
- List of sports awards honoring women
