= Linda Eshun =

Ghanaian footballer

Personal information
- Date of birth: 5 August 1992 (age 34)
- Place of birth: Sekondi-Takoradi, Ghana
- Height: 1.54 m (5 ft 1 in)
- Position: Defender

Senior career*
Years	Team	Apps	(Gls)
- Hasaacas Ladies
2021	Parquesol	1	(0)

International career^{‡}
2014–	Ghana		
Medal record
Representing Ghana
Women's Africa Cup of Nations
Third place	2016 Cameroon
- * Club domestic league appearances and goals ‡ National team caps and goals as of 11 october 2014 (before the 2014 African Women's Championship)

Linda Eshun (born 5 August 1992) is a Ghanaian footballer who plays as a defender who has played for the Ghana women's national football team since 2014. She competed at the 2014 African Women's Championship. At the club level, she played for Hasaacas Ladies in Ghana.
