= Florence Iweta =

Nigerian footballer

Personal information
- Date of birth: 29 March 1983 (age 43)
- Place of birth: Nigeria
- Position: Defender

International career
Years	Team	Apps	(Gls)
1999–2003	Nigeria	2	(0)

Florence Iweta (born 29 March 1983) is a Nigerian former football defender who played for the Nigeria women's national football team. She represented Nigeria at the 2000 Summer Olympics.

== See also ==
- Nigeria at the 2000 Summer Olympics
