= Mabo Ismaila =

Nigerian football manager (1944–2023)

Personal information
- Date of birth: 15 July 1944
- Date of death: 13 March 2023 (aged 78)

Managerial career
- Years: Team
- 1999–2002: Nigeria Women
- 2004: Nigeria Women

Mabo Ismaila (15 July 1944 – 13 March 2023) was a Nigerian football manager and international footballer.

== Career ==
Ismaila was the head coach of the Nigeria women's national team at the 1999 FIFA Women's World Cup, 2000 Summer Olympics and 2004 Summer Olympics. He led Nigeria to the quarter-finals of the World Cup, the team's best ever result. Before then, Mabo played for Nigeria national team, then known as the Green Eagles. He was the captain of the great Mighty Jet of Jos. In the team, he played along players such as his younger brother Uba Junior, Sule Kekere, Jide Dina, Alloysius Atuegbu, Lawandi Layiwola Olagbemiro, Baba Otu Mohammed and Sam Garba Okoye.

== Personal life and death ==
Ismaila confirmed that he was ill to The Punch in January 2023, following the death of his wife. He died on 13 March 2023, at the age of 78.
