= Florence Ajayi =

Nigerian footballer

Personal information
- Full name: Florence Kikelomo Ajayi
- Date of birth: 28 April 1977 (age 49)
- Place of birth: Akure, Nigeria
- Height: 1.64 m (5 ft 5 in)
- Position: Defender

Senior career*
Years	Team	Apps	(Gls)
- Koko Queens
- Rivers Angels
- Jegede Babes
–1999	Pelican Stars		
1999–2001	Niederkirchen		
2001–2004	Police Machine		
2004–2008	Bayelsa Queens		
2008–2010	Tianjin Teda		
2011–2012	Krka Novo Mesto	7	(0)
2012–2013	Pogoń Szczecin		
2013–2014	Dínamo Guadalajara		
2014–?	FC Gintra		

International career
1998–2008	Nigeria (Note: FIFA World Cup (including qualifications) and Olympics matches only)	19	(2)
- * Club domestic league appearances and goals

Florence Kikelomo Ajayi is a former Nigerian footballer who played as a defender.

== Career ==
Ajayi started her career in the Nigerian Championship for teams including Kakanfo Babes, Abeokuta, Rivers Angels, Jagede Babes and the Pelican Stars. Following her participation in the 1999 World Cup she signed for 1. FFC 08 Niederkirchen in the German Bundesliga, where she spent two full seasons. She later returned to Nigeria, playing for the Police Machine and the Bayelsa Queen. She continued playing there until 2008, when she relocated to the Tianjin Teda within the Chinese Super League. In 2010, she returned to the European leagues, playing for Slovenia's Krka Novo Mesto, Poland's Pogoń Szczecin, and Spain's Dínamo Guadalajara.

== International ==
As a member of the Nigerian national team, Ajayi won a total of five consecutive African Championships between 1998 and 2006. She also competed in the 1999 and 2003 World Cups and in the 2000 and 2008 Summer Olympics. During the events, she served as the Nigerian women's team captain.
