= Sheila Okai =

Ghanaian footballer

Personal information
- Date of birth: 14 February 1979 (age 47)
- Positions: Midfielder; forward

Senior career*
Years	Team	Apps	(Gls)
- Ghatel Ladies

International career^{‡}
	Ghana	30	(5)
- * Club domestic league appearances and goals ‡ National team caps and goals as of 10 September 2007 (before the 2007 FIFA Women's World Cup)

Sheila Okai (born 14 February 1979) is a Ghanaian women's international footballer who plays as a midfielder and forward. She is a member of the Ghana women's national football team. She was part of the team at the 1999 FIFA Women's World Cup and at the 2007 FIFA Women's World Cup. On club level she plays for Ghatel Ladies in Ghana.
