= Adjoa Bayor =

Ghanaian footballer

Personal information
- Date of birth: 17 May 1979 (age 47)
- Place of birth: Accra, Ghana
- Height: 1.63 m (5 ft 4 in)
- Position: Midfielder

Senior career*
Years	Team	Apps	(Gls)
1997–2005	Ghatel Ladies		
2006–2007	FC Indiana	5	(0)
2007–2008	Ghatel Ladies	9	(0)
2009–2011	FF USV Jena	18	(1)
2010	FF USV Jena II	2	(0)
2011–20??	FC Indiana		

International career^{‡}
1997–2011	Ghana	33	(6)
- * Club domestic league appearances and goals ‡ National team caps and goals as of 20 September 2007

Grace Adjoa Bayor (popularly known as Adjoa Bayor, born 17 May 1979) is a Ghanaian former footballer who played as a midfielder. She has captained the Ghana women's national team.

== International career ==
Bayor was part of the Ghana women's national football team at the 1999 FIFA Women's World Cup in the United States.

== Career ==
She was a member of the World All Stars team to play against the China women's national football team in April 2007 at Wuhan, China.

She has played for Ghatel Ladies in Accra, Ghana and has also played for FC Indiana in the United States recently. Bayor joined on 21 January 2009 to FF USV Jena.

She was selected in 2018 by CAF to assist Deputy Secretary in football and development Anthony Baffoe to conduct the draw for Africa Women Cup of Nations.

== International ==
In September 2007 Adjoa Bayor captained the Ghana national team at the World Cup in China. Although Ghana did not get out of the group stage, Bayor scored a remarkable goal from a free kick just outside Norway's penalty area when she faced the wrong way as another player ran up and jumped over the ball, then she casually turned and shot.

== Titles ==
She was voted African Women Footballer of the Year in 2003 by CAF and was in contention in 2004 and 2006.

== Honours ==
- 2003 — African Women Player of the Year.

Awards
Preceded by Alberta Sackey	African Women Player of the Year; 2003	Succeeded by Perpetua Nkwocha
Notes and references
1. https://www.rsssf.org/miscellaneous/afr-wpoy.html
