= Elizabeth Baidu =

Ghanaian footballer

Personal information
- Date of birth: 28 April 1978 (age 48)
- Position: Defender

Senior career*
Years	Team	Apps	(Gls)
- Bluna Ladies

International career^{‡}
- Ghana
- * Club domestic league appearances and goals ‡ National team caps and goals as of 19 June 1999 (before the 1999 FIFA Women's World Cup)

Elizabeth Baidu (born 28 April 1978) is a Ghanaian women's international footballer who plays as a defender. She was a member of the Ghana women's national football team. She was part of the team at the 1999 FIFA Women's World Cup and at the 2003 FIFA Women's World Cup. On club level she played for Bluna Ladies in Ghana.
