= Olaitan Yusuf =

Nigerian footballer

Personal information
- Date of birth: 12 January 1982 (age 44)
- Place of birth: Ilorin, Kwara, Nigeria
- Height: 1.81 m (5 ft 11 in)
- Position: Forward

Senior career*
Years	Team	Apps	(Gls)
2003–2004	Pelican Stars		

International career
	Nigeria	3	(0)
- * Club domestic league appearances and goals

Olaitan Yusuf (born 12 January 1982) is a Nigerian footballer who plays as a forward for the Nigeria women's national football team. She was part of the team at the 2003 FIFA Women's World Cup and has been a two-time Peach Belt Conference Player of the Year.

== Club career ==
Yusuf got onto the national stage with her first season in 2004, when she led D-II with 3.7 points and 1.75 goals per game where she drilled 35 goals and finished with 74 points which broke the Peach Belt Conference record and Clayton State Athletics Hall of Famer Nkiru Okosieme's 2001 program records of 33 goals and 72 points.

== International career ==
Yusuf played an international friendly game in 2003 against Netherlands and Germany.

She made her first major appearance for the Nigerian national team as a substitute in the match against Sweden on 28 September 2003 at the Women's World Cup in the United States.
