= Mavis Dgajmah =

Ghanaian footballer

Personal information
- Date of birth: 21 December 1973 (age 52)
- Position: Forward

Senior career*
| Years | Team | Apps | (Gls) |
- La Ladies

International career^{‡}
- Ghana
- * Club domestic league appearances and goals ‡ National team caps and goals as of 19 June 1999 (before the 1999 FIFA Women's World Cup)

Mavis Dgajmah (born 21 December 1973) is a Ghanaian women's international footballer who plays as a forward. She was a member of the Ghana women's national football team. She was part of the team at the 1999 FIFA Women's World Cup and at the 2003 FIFA Women's World Cup. On club level she played for La Ladies in Ghana.
