= Réunion women's national football team =

Women's national association football team representing Réunion

Réunion
- Association: Réunionese Football League
- Confederation: CAF (Africa)
- FIFA code: REU
First colours	Second colours

First international
- Réunion 4–3 Egypt (Saint-Paul; 30 July 2000)

Biggest win
- Mayotte 0–8 Réunion (Mliha, Mayotte; 2 May 2015)

Biggest defeat
- South Africa 3–0 Réunion (Vosloorus; 11 November 2000)

Women's Africa Cup of Nations
- Appearances: 1 (first in 2000)
- Best result: Group stage (2000)

The Réunion women's national football team is the regional football team of Réunion, a French island, and is not recognised by FIFA. They have played international matches against Egypt, South Africa, Zimbabwe, Uganda and Mauritius. There is a two-level women's league in the country, with promotion and relegation between each division.

== History ==
The national team is not recognised by FIFA. In 2000, they participated in the African Women's Championships. They qualified by beating Egypt women's national football team 5–4 on aggregate (winning 4–3 at home and drawing the away leg 1–1). The first match at the final tournament was a 0–3 loss to South Africa women's national football team in Vosloorus. The second match they played in was a 1–2 loss to Zimbabwe women's national football team. Their final match was a 1–2 loss to Uganda women's national football team. They finished last in their group. Members of the team who played in the tournament included Carole Keita, Lise May Ouledi, Tania Nice, Laurianne Boyer, Claure Lebon, Kelly Bello, Marie Therese Fanovana, Prisca Maraguet, Cathy Chateauroux, Nadege Grosmane, Martine Turpin, Rachelle Lecoutre, Florence Mussard. The side was coached by Patrick Honorine. To date, this is the only competition in CAF which Réunion have participated and qualified. In July 2011, there were plans to host a COSAFA Women's Championship in Réunion. The competition was eventually held in Zimbabwe and Réunion did not participate. On 3 June 2012, Réunion recorded their biggest win to date, winning 3–0 against Mauritius, who were playing their first ever international match.

The Réunion women's national under-20 football team competed in the 2010 African U-20 Women's World Cup Qualifying Tournament. They beat Madagascar 3–1 away from home in the first leg, and went on to win the second leg 4–1 at home.

== Results and fixtures ==
The following is a list of match results in the last 12 months, as well as any future matches that have been scheduled.

Legend

Win Draw Lose Fixture

== Players ==
=== Current squad ===
The following players were called up for the friendly matche against the Seychelles on 23 November 2022.

Caps and goals correct as of 23 November 2022

No.	Pos.	Player	Date of birth (age)	Caps	Goals	Club
		Sarah Amdria				(Ligue réunionnaise de football) St Denis FC
		Olivia Banor				(Ligue réunionnaise de football) S.S. Jeanne D'Arc
		Laura Beatrix				(Ligue réunionnaise de football) Saint-Pauloise FC
		Aurélie Chaissac				(Ligue réunionnaise de football) S.S. Jeanne D'Arc
		Marie Laure Chamand				(Ligue réunionnaise de football) Saint-Pauloise FC
		Anaëlle Clara				(Ligue réunionnaise de football) AFFE
		Pamela Clorate				(Ligue réunionnaise de football) AFFE
		Maëlle Dufestin				(Ligue réunionnaise de football) Saint-Pauloise FC
		Lucie Etheve				(Ligue réunionnaise de football) A.S. Excelsior
		Gwedoline Etheve				(Ligue réunionnaise de football) JS Saint-Pierroise
		Emma Fontaine				(Ligue réunionnaise de football) A.S. Excelsior
		Héléna Fontaine				(Ligue réunionnaise de football) US Stade Tamponnaise
		Eleanore Fontaine				(Ligue réunionnaise de football) S.S. Jeanne D'Arc
		Léa Fradelin				(Ligue réunionnaise de football) St Denis FC
		Samira Ganova				(Ligue réunionnaise de football) JS Saint-Pierroise
		Cynthia Genna				(Ligue réunionnaise de football) OC Avirons
		Anaëlle Grondin				(Ligue réunionnaise de football) St Denis FC
		Lashuana Grondin				(Ligue réunionnaise de football) St Denis FC
		Oyana Hoarau				(Ligue réunionnaise de football) St Denis FC
		Lorenza Hoarau				(Ligue réunionnaise de football) Saint-Pauloise FC
		Lisa Hubert				(Ligue réunionnaise de football) A.S. St Louisienne
		Agnés Mareux				(Ligue réunionnaise de football) S.D.E.F.A
		Orlane Maurice				(Ligue réunionnaise de football) S.D.E.F.A
		Macy Mera				(Ligue réunionnaise de football) A.S. St Louisienne
		Laurie Nangue				(Ligue réunionnaise de football) A.S. St Louisienne
		Noemie Nayagom				(Ligue réunionnaise de football) A.S. St Louisienne
		Shirley Orange				(Ligue réunionnaise de football) St Denis FC
		Laura Payet				(Ligue réunionnaise de football) A.S. St Louisienne
		Saïna Sincere				(Ligue réunionnaise de football) Saint-Pauloise FC
		Emy Techer				(Ligue réunionnaise de football) JS Saint-Pierroise
		Gwenaelle Vimbouly				(Ligue réunionnaise de football) FC Bagatelle
		Anaïs Zafarane				(Ligue réunionnaise de football) A.S. Excelsior

== Previous squads ==
Africa Women Cup of Nations

- 2000 African Women's Championship squad

== Honours ==
- Football at the Indian Ocean Island Games: Champion 2015

== See also ==
- Football in Réunion
    - Women's football in Réunion
- Réunion men's football team
