= Alberta Sackey =

Ghanaian footballer

Personal information
- Full name: Alberta Sackey
- Date of birth: November 6, 1972 (age 53)
- Place of birth: Ghana
- Height: 1.68 m (5 ft 6 in)
- Position: Forward

International career
Years	Team	Apps	(Gls)
1999–2003	Ghana		

Alberta Sackey (born November 6, 1972) is a Ghanaian former international footballer who played as a forward. She played for Ghana at the 1999 FIFA Women's World Cup and the 2003 FIFA Women's World Cup. Her goal against Australia in the 2003 World Cup was nominated on FIFA.com for the greatest goal in Women's World Cup history. She was the 2002 African Women's Footballer of the Year.
