= 1995 African Women's Championship =

2nd edition of WAFCON

Tournament details
- Dates: 5 November 1994 – 18 March 1995
- Teams: 8

Final positions
- Champions: Nigeria (2nd title)
- Runners-up: South Africa

Tournament statistics
- Matches played: 10
- Goals scored: 55 (5.5 per match)

The 1995 African Women's Championship was the second edition of the African women's football tournament organized by the Confederation of African Football to determine its single qualifier for the 1995 FIFA Women's World Cup, which eventually went to Nigeria.

Eight teams were initially scheduled to play in this edition of the tournament, but two withdrew. This was the second and final edition of the tournament to be played on a home-and-away knockout basis, as CAF upgraded and rechristen the tournament to full-scale with the introduction of a group stage from the following edition onwards.

== Participating teams ==
The participating teams were:

- Angola
- Cameroon
- Ghana
- Guinea
- Nigeria
- Sierra Leone
- South Africa
- Zambia

== Bracket ==
Quarter-finals
Ghana (w/o)
Guinea
Nigeria	9	2	11
Sierra Leone	0	0	0
South Africa	5	6	11
Zambia	3	2	5
Angola (w/o)
Cameroon

Semi-finals
Ghana	0	0	0
Nigeria	3	2	5
South Africa	3	3	6
Angola	1	3	4

Final
Nigeria	4	7	11
South Africa	1	1	2

== First round ==
6 November 1994

Nigeria	9–0	Sierra Leone

Lagos
20 November 1994

Sierra Leone	0–2	Nigeria

Freetown

Nigeria win 11–0 on aggregate.

5 November 1994

South Africa	5–3	Zambia

South Africa
20 November 1994

Zambia	2–6	South Africa

Zambia

South Africa win 11–5 on aggregate.

Angola	w/o	Cameroon

Cameroon withdrew, thus Angola advance.

Ghana	w/o	Guinea

Guinea withdrew, thus Ghana advance.

== Second round ==
9 January 1995

Ghana	0–3	Nigeria

Ghana
23 January 1995

Nigeria	2–0	Ghana

Lagos

Nigeria win 5–0 on aggregate.

7 January 1995

Angola	1–3	South Africa

Estádio dos Coqueiros, Luanda, Angola
21 January 1995

South Africa	3–3	Angola

South Africa

South Africa win 6–4 on aggregate.

== Final round ==
4 March 1995

Nigeria	4–1	South Africa

Ibadan
18 March 1995

South Africa	1–7	Nigeria

Johannesburg

Nigeria won 11–2 on aggregate, thus won this edition of the tournament and qualified for the 1995 FIFA Women's World Cup in Sweden.

== Awards ==
1995 African Women's Championship winners

**Nigeria**

=== Team statistics ===
Pos.	Team	Pld	W	D	L	Pts	GF	GA	GD
1	Nigeria	6	6	0	0	18	27	2	+25
2	South Africa	6	3	1	2	10	19	20	−1
**Eliminated in the second round**
3	Angola	2	0	1	1	1	4	6	−2
4	Ghana	2	0	0	2	0	0	5	−5
**Eliminated in the first round**
5	Zambia	2	0	0	2	0	5	11	−6
6	Sierra Leone	2	0	0	2	0	0	11	−11
—	Cameroon	0	0	0	0	0	0	0	0
—	Guinea	0	0	0	0	0	0	0	0
Total		10^{(1)}	9	1^{(2)}	9	29	55	55	0

Team(s) rendered in italics represent(s) the host nation(s). The competition's winning team is rendered in bold.
^{(1)} – Total games lost not counted in total games played (total games lost = total games won)
^{(2)} – Total number of games drawn (tied) for all teams = Total number of games drawn (tied) ÷ 2 (both teams involved)

== Qualified team for FIFA Women's World Cup ==
Team	Qualified on	Previous appearances in FIFA Women's World Cup^{1}
Nigeria	18 April 1995	1 (1991)
