= Mercy Akide =

Nigerian footballer

Personal information
- Full name: Mercy Joy Akide Udoh
- Birth name: Mercy Joy Akide
- Date of birth: 26 August 1975 (age 51)
- Place of birth: Port Harcourt, Nigeria
- Height: 1.81 m (5 ft 11 in)
- Position: Midfielder

College career
Years	Team	Apps	(Gls)
1999	Milligan Buffaloes		(42)

Senior career*
Years	Team	Apps	(Gls)
1988–1990	Garden City Queens		
1991–1994	Jegede Babes		
1995–1998	Ufuoma Babes		
1998–1999	Pelican Stars		
1999–2000	Hampton Roads Piranhas		
2001–2002	San Diego Spirit		
2003–2006	Hampton Roads Piranhas		

International career
- Nigeria
- * Club domestic league appearances and goals

Mercy Joy Akide Udoh (née Akide; born 26 August 1975) is a Nigerian former footballer who played as a midfielder for the Nigeria women's national football team.

== Early life ==
Mercy started playing football at the age of five with her oldest brother Seleipiri and younger brother Ipali in the sandy field of Bundu Waterside, near Port Harcourt Prisons in Port Harcourt. Her speed was recognized from a young age, and when she was 12 years old, at Holy Rosary Secondary School in Port Harcourt, she took part in long-distance races, running the 400m, 800m and 1500m races against older competitors. She was also a regional table tennis champion, but soccer was the sport where she really stood out.

Mercy earned the nickname "Ske", which in local parlance meant "skinny", while playing against boys at Mile 1 in Port Harcourt. Among her many admirers then was a young kid called Chidi Odiah, who is now a full Nigeria international, playing club football with CSKA Moscow.

In consideration of her skills in particular, a group of youth soccer organisers put together a girls' tournament to select the girls who would become "the Garden City Queens".

After two years of playing for the Queens, and turning down the overtures of the rival Port Harcourt-based Larry's Angels, Akide left Port Harcourt for Lagos to continue both education and soccer with Jegede Babes under the influence of Princess Bola Jegede.

== Career ==
=== Garden City Queens ===
At that time, the Nigerian Women's league was in its formative years and Garden City Queens was not among the top teams such as Jegede Babes, Ufuoma Babes and Larry's Angels. The club played mostly exhibition games around the state with Akide as the star attraction. She averaged nearly five goals per game during the two years she spent at the club. One of those friendly games was against elite team Jegede Babes, and although the Queens lost 6–1, Akide scored the only goal for her side.

Club proprietor Princess Bola Jegede was so impressed by her that she promptly offered her a place in her club.

=== Jegede Babes ===
Akide joined Jegede Babes just as Nigeria were taking part in the inaugural Women's World Cup in China in 1991. With an already established strike force in place, Akide was moved to central midfield for the 1992 season where she took time to adjust. But by the 1993 season, she emerged highest goalscorer in both league and Cup. She plundered 16 goals in the league and another 8 in the Challenge Cup. She took the form into the next season, scoring 15 goals in the 1994 league season and 10 in the Challenge Cup to earn herself a call-up to coach Ismaila Mabo's national camp. Unfortunately, her goals were not enough to help Jegede to either title.

=== Ufuoma Babes ===
After returning from the 1995 FIFA Women's World Cup, Akide (who had by now earned the nickname of Marvelous) pitched tent with Warri-based club Ufuoma Babes, who had won the league and Cup double in the previous two years. It was to be a rewarding move. Her 17 goals in the league and 9 in the Challenge Cup helped Ufuoma to the double. It was the first of many titles. The next season, she hit 11 league goals and 10 Challenge Cup goals and Ufuoma Babes continued their dominance of the domestic league. Akide still finished with the top goalscoring honours in 1997. She scored 14 league goals and 8 Challenge Cup goals as Ufuoma romped to their fourth consecutive double. Pelican Stars dethroned Ufuoma Babes in both the league and Cup in 1998 with Akide scoring a disappointing 10 league goals and 7 in the Challenge Cup.

=== Pelican Stars ===
Akide spent only one year with Pelican Stars, but it was a rewarding year, trophy wise. Pelican again won the double even though Akide only managed 9 league goals and 6 Challenge Cup goals. By the time the season was over, Akide had earned a scholarship to Milligan College in Tennessee, United States, after a scintillating World Cup performance with the Super Falcons. In her only season at the school, she recorded 42 goals and 15 assists, setting a record for goals and points (99) in a season.

== International career ==
Her two seasons of consistency with Jegede Babes, where she scored a total of 49 goals in two seasons, caught the attention of national coach Ismaila Mabo and Mercy was called to camp in 1994. But another rush of goals, 17 in the league and 9 in the Challenge Cup earned her a recall. Her international debut came soon after, a World Cup qualifier against Sierra Leone in Ibadan with Mercy playing as a winger. She marked it with two goals. She scored one more in the return leg to cement her place in the team. In 2001, she was named the first African Women Footballer of the Year, and was a 1999 and 2004 FIFA World All-Star.

She has played for Nigeria in three FIFA Women's World Cups and also helped Nigeria's Super Falcons to three African Women Championships (AWC) titles in 1998, 2000 and 2002. In November 2004, she married football journalist Colin Udoh in her home town of Port Harcourt.

In 2005, she was named by FIFA as one of its 15 Ambassadors for Women Football.

== Coaching career ==
Between 2006 and 2008, Mercy was employed at Stars Soccer Club, where she was the head coach for Stars U-16 Athena C Gold Girls and worked within Youth Development (an NGO also employing her friend Luke Concannon, a coach of the U-13 girls team.) From 2008 to 2013, Mercy worked as the co-director of Youth Development and for Beach FC in Virginia Beach, Virginia. In 2013, Mercy joined the coaching staff of Virginia Rush Soccer Club, in Virginia Beach, Virginia.

== Honours ==
Individual

- IFFHS All-time Africa Women's Dream Team: 2021
