= Stella Mbachu =

Nigerian footballer

Personal information
- Full name: Stella Mbachu
- Date of birth: 16 April 1978 (age 48)
- Place of birth: Mgbidi, Nigeria
- Height: 1.65 m (5 ft 5 in)
- Position: Forward

Senior career*
Years	Team	Apps	(Gls)
????-2014	Rivers Angels		

International career
1999–2014	Nigeria	88	(20)
- * Club domestic league appearances and goals

Stella Chinyere Mbachu // (born 16 April 1978) is a Nigerian former professional soccer player who played as a forward for the Nigeria women's national football team.
