= 2024 Women's Africa Cup of Nations final =

Final match of the 2024 WAFCON

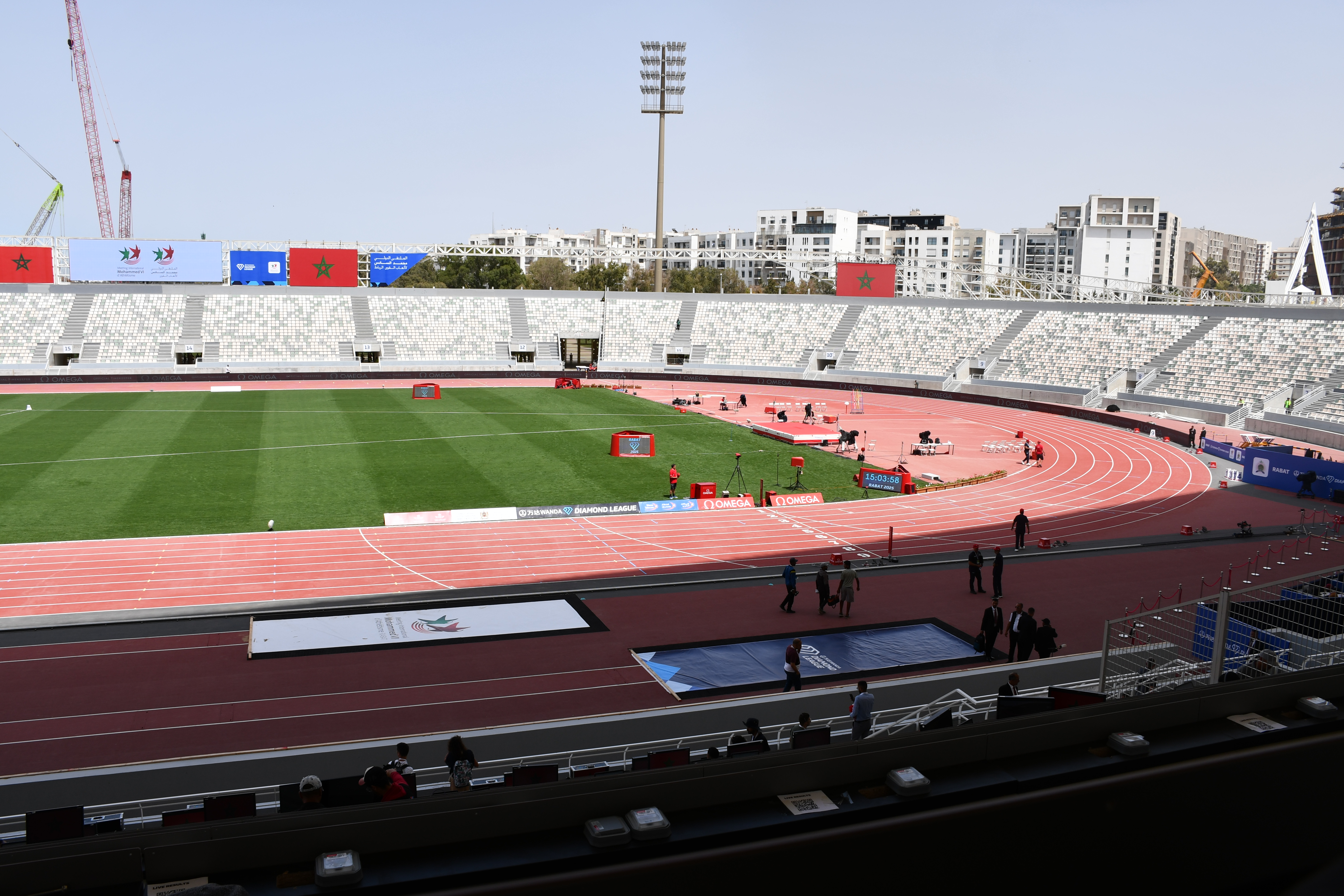
- The Rabat Olympic Stadium in Rabat hosted the final
- Event: 2024 Women's Africa Cup of Nations
Morocco	Nigeria
2	3
- Date: July 26, 2025
- Venue: Rabat Olympic Stadium, Rabat.
- Player of the Match: Esther Okoronkwo
- Referee: Antsino Twanyanyukwa (Namibia)
- Attendance: 21,000
- Weather: Cloudy night 22 °C (72 °F); 96% humidity

The 2024 Women's Africa Cup of Nations final was an association football match that took place at Rabat Olympic Stadium in Rabat, Morocco, on 26 July 2025, to determine the winners of 2024 Women's Africa Cup of Nations. It was the 13th final of the biennial African women's association football tournament organized by the Confederation of African Football (CAF) contested between Morocco, in their second Wafcon final, and Nigeria, in their tenth Wafcon final. This was the first final between both teams at any major tournament.

Nigeria won the match in regulation time with a score of 3–2 for a record-extending 10th title, their fourth WAFCON title in five tournaments.

Morocco led 2-0 at the break through goals from Ghizlane Chebbak and Sanaa Mssoudy. But Nigeria after the break, pulled a goal back from the penalty spot in the 64th minute through Esther Okoronkwo. Subsequent goals from Folashade Ijamilusi to equalise in the 71st minute, and substitute Jennifer Echegini winner with two minutes of the game remaining, completed Nigeria's comeback.

== Background ==
The 2024 edition continued the expansion from previous tournament and was held between 5 July and 26 July 2025 in five cities, all in Morocco. Qualifying rounds were held between September and concluded 26 December 2023, with 42 out of the 54 African nations vying for the 11 available group stage spots through matches played on a home-and-away two-legged basis. The tournament featured twelve teams divided into three groups of four. The top two teams from each group, along with the two best third-placed teams, advanced to the knockout stage. Video assistant referee (VAR) technology was used throughout the tournament matches to assist refereeing decisions.

The tournament was delayed and took place Northern Hemisphere's Summer 2025, while retaining the name WAFCON 2024 and using the same host and venues.

The match marked Morocco's second consecutive appearance in a Women's Afcon final, having lost the 2022 final. This would be two consecutive finals on home soil for Morocco, and would be the first Wafcon final for manager Jorge Vilda after recently winning the 2023 Women's World Cup with Spain.

Nigeria played in a record-extending 10th Women's Africa Cup of Nations title final, their recent since the 2018 final. With a record nine titles from 12 editions, they have won all previous 9 finals they played in. They were the highest-ranked team in the tournament, ranked number 36th in the world when the tournament began.

This would be the fourth meeting between the two teams at the WAFCON; the two sides had met in semifinals of the previous edition with Morocco winning 5–4 on penalty shootout following a 1–1 draw. Nigeria leads the all-time series against Morocco, with a 2–1–0 record.

=== Previous finals ===
Only counting African Women's Championship era (1998 onwards).

Team	Previous final appearances (bold indicates winners)
Morocco	1 (2022)
Nigeria	9 (**1998**, **2000**, **2002**, **2004**, **2006**, **2010**, **2014**, **2016**, **2018**)

== Venue ==
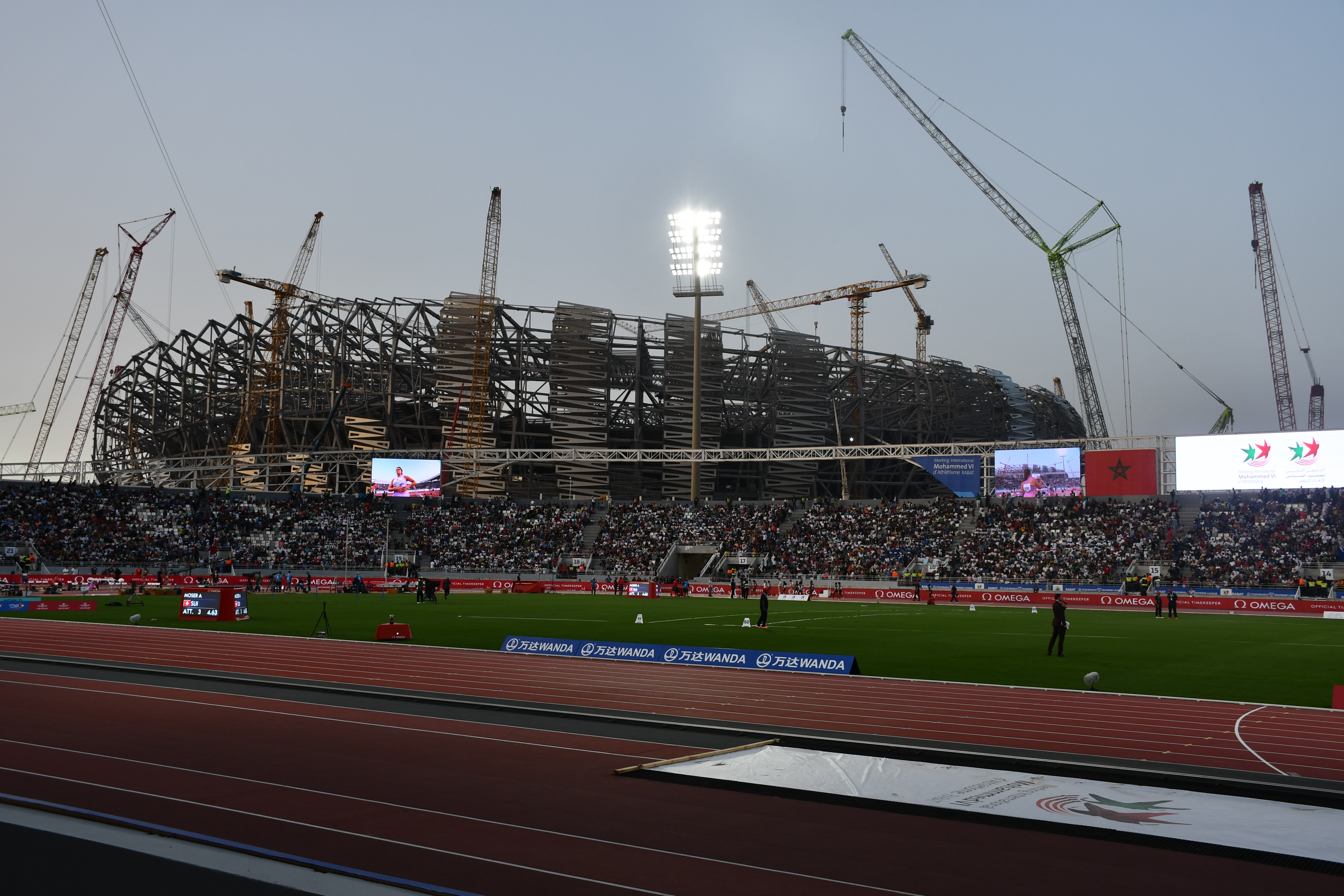
Olympic Stadium, in Rabat, Morocco hosted the final.

The final was held at the 21,000-capacity multi-purpose Rabat Olympic Stadium in the capital city of Rabat.

The stadium was built in a record time of nine months (approximately 36 weeks). The allocated budget was nearly 496 million dirhams, plus an additional 32.1 million dirhams for laying the turf and installing the stands. The project required intensive organization, with work proceeding day and night to ensure the stadium was ready before the inauguration of the Meeting International Mohammed VI d'Athlétisme de Rabat, the fourth stage of the 2025 Diamond League.

== Road to the final ==
=== Morocco ===
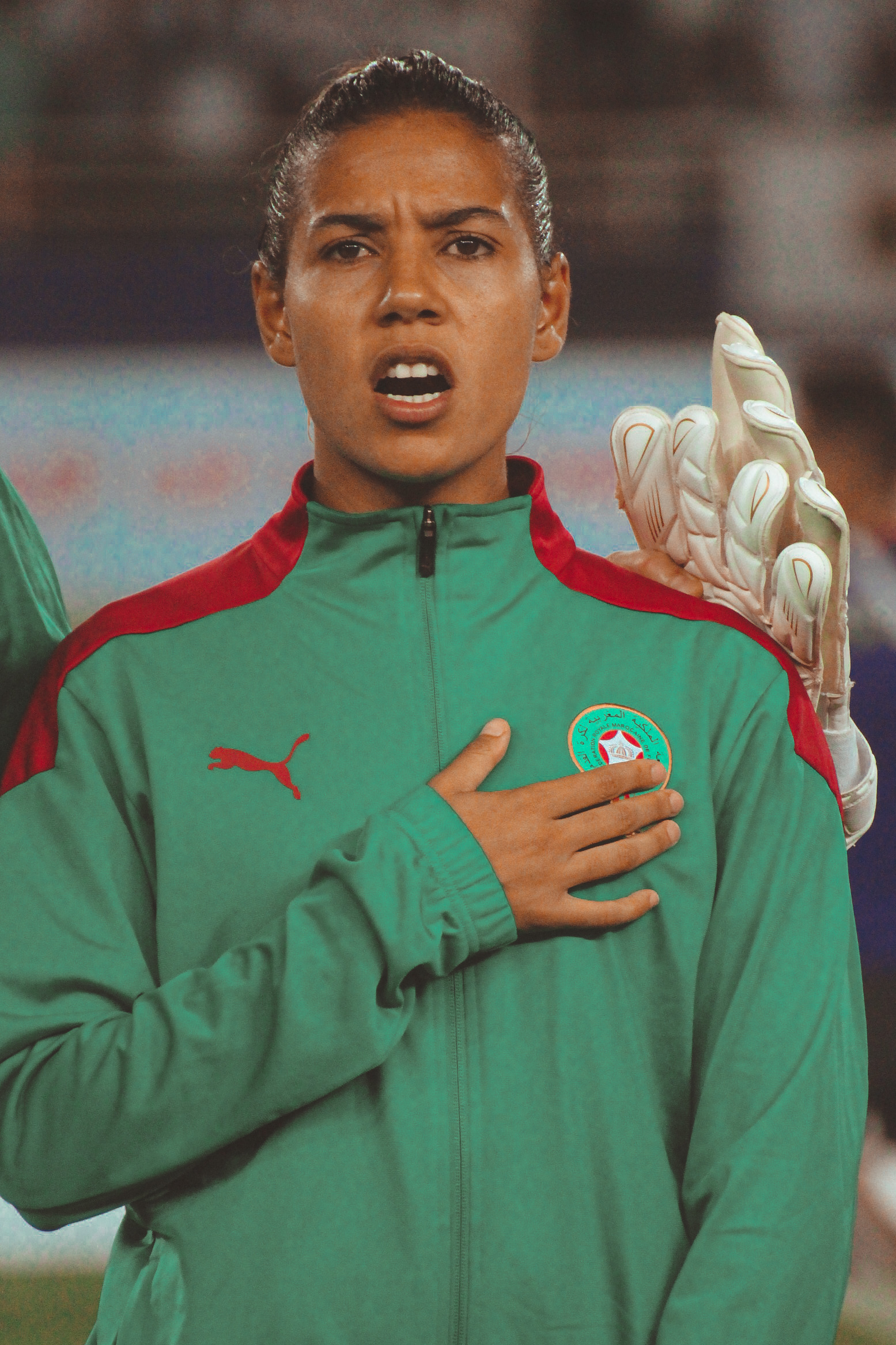
Morocco's captain and tournament's top scorer Ghizlane Chebbak scored a goal in the final

Having been selected as host consecutively, Morocco automatically qualified as the host nation for the tournament. Morocco finished as runners-up in the previous edition, their best run in the Wafcon.

As host they were drawn into Group A alongside Zambia, Senegal, and DR Congo. Morocco drew 2–2 in their first group match against Zambia, with Morocco equalizing twice in the match. Morocco managed to finish top in the group edging Zambia in goals difference, after a 4–2 win over Dr Congo which included an hattrick from Ghizlane Chebbak and a 1–0 win against Senegal. Their quarter-finals match would be against Mali, Morocco cruised to a 3–1 win, conceding late in the match.

In the semi-finals with Ghana, Morocco again conceded in the first half, going down 1–0 and until the 55th minute, when Ouzraoui scored the equalizer to draw 1–1 after extended regulation time, and win 4–2 in a four-round penalty shoot-out, sending Morocco to a second consecutive Wafcon finals.

=== Nigeria ===
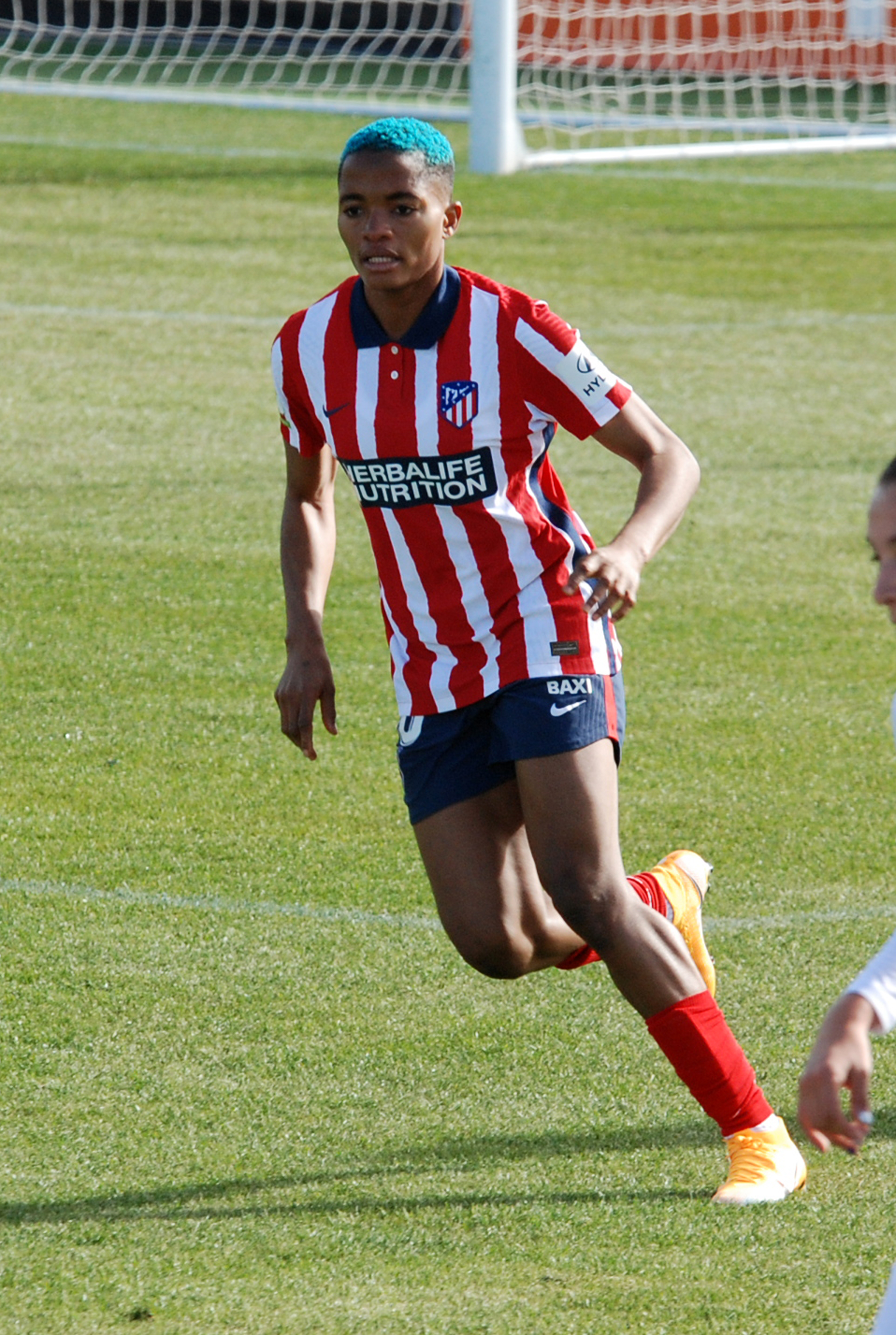
Nigeria's captain Rasheedat Ajibade was named player of the tournament.

As the most decorated women's team in Africa with nine Wafcon titles, Nigeria's Super falcons has won more continental titles than any other African national side – men's or women's. Nigeria qualified for the tournament with 7–1 aggregate win over Cape Verde in the second stage of the qualification rounds.

Nigeria's opening match of the tournament was against Tunisia, with the match finishing with a 3–0 win. Their second game against Botswana, Nigeria won 1–0 with Chinwendu Ihezuo scoring late. Nigeria drew 0–0 in their final group stage match against Algeria to finish on top of their group; they were yet to conceded after three matches. Nigeria's quarter-finals match would be against 2022 third place Zambia, who defeated them in that edition's third place play-off, ending with a 5–0 thumping, continuing Nigeria's perfect goals defence.

Their thirteenth straight semi-final, would be against the defending Wafcon champions, South Africa. Nigeria won 2–1, Rasheedat Ajibade would convert a penalty to score the first goal of the match in the 45th minute, but conceded for the first time when South Africa leveled the scoreline with a penalty of their own. The match appeared destined for extra time until Michelle Alozie scored late with a long range strike from 35-yards for the win, to see Nigeria through to the finals for the tenth time.

Morocco
Round
Nigeria
Opponents
Results
Group stage
Opponents
Results
Zambia
2–2
Match 1
Tunisia
3–0
DR Congo
4–2
Match 2
Botswana
1–0
Senegal
1–0
Match 3
Algeria
0–0
Group A winners

Pos	Team	Pld	Pts
1	Morocco (H)	3	7
2	Zambia	3	7
3	Senegal	3	3
4	DR Congo	3	0

Source: CAF
(H) Hosts
Final standings
Group B winners

Pos	Team	Pld	Pts
1	Nigeria	3	7
2	Algeria	3	5
3	Botswana	3	3
4	Tunisia	3	1

Source: CAF
Opponents
Results
Knockout stage
Opponents
Results
Mali
3–1
Quarter-finals
Zambia
5–0
Ghana
1–1 (a.e.t.; 4–2 p)
Semi-finals
South Africa
2–1

== Match ==
=== Summary ===
Both Nigeria and Morocco made just one change each to their semi final line up. Nigeria had the first real attack in the 4th minute with a corner kick, Folashade Ijamilusi with the cross as Michelle Alozie fired wide. Najat Badri hit from just outside the box was off target in the 8th minute. Ashleigh Plumptre fluffed the chance to clear the ball, and it fell just outside the area to Ghizlane Chebbak, whose rising shot gave goalkeeper Chiamaka Nnadozie no chance as Nigeria conceded for the first time in open play at the tournament in the 12th minute. The Moroccan lead doubled in the 24th minute as the ball flew across the Nigerian goalmouth to Sanaa Mssoudy, with excellent footwork on the left side of the penalty area before drilling a low, left-footed shot into the far corner. The first half belonged entirely to Morocco, going into the break with a comfortable two-goal cushion. Nigeria, despite enjoying 56.9% possession, managed just two shots with only one weak effort on target went into half-time trailing 0–2.

In the second half as Nigeria were handed a lifeline in the 63rd minute when they were awarded a penalty. The decision came after Ijamilusi hooked the ball back, striking the arm of Moroccan defender Nouhaila Benzina. Okoronkwo converted the penalty down the middle, sending the goalkeeper the wrong way. In the 71st minute, Okoronkwo on a solo run slipped a well-timed pass through to Ijamilusi, who finished with her left foot into the bottom corner to level the match. Ijamilusi was replaced for Nigeria by Asisat Oshoala, and a minute later the referee initially awarded Morocco a penalty for handball following a corner, when Imane Saoud helped a cross onto the hand of Nigeria's Blessing Demehin, who was barely two yards away. Chebbak had the ball on the spot when Namibian referee Antsino Twanyanyukwa was called to the VAR screen and overturned her decision almost four minutes later.

With extra time looming, a set-piece routine saw Okoronkwo swing in a free-kick that fell kindly to unmarked Jennifer Echegini, to guide the ball in on the half-volley in the 88th minute. Morocco pushed for an equaliser in the final stages, forcing a few nervy moments, but Nigeria held their shape and saw out the result.

== Details ==
26 July 2025
21:00

Morocco	2–3	Nigeria
Chebbak 12'; Mssoudy 24'	(FIFA) (CAF)	Okoronkwo 64' (pen.); Ijamilusi 71'; Echegini 88'

Rabat Olympic Stadium, Rabat
Attendance: 21,000
Referee: Antsino Twanyanyukwa (Namibia)

2024 Women's African cup of Nations winners

Nigeria
10th title

Morocco	Nigeria

Formation: 4–3–3
GK	1	Khadija Er-Rmichi
RB	17	Hanane Aït El Haj
DF	3	Nouhaila Benzina
DF	14	Aziza Rabbah	(substituted off) 90'
LB	2	Zineb Redouani
CB	21	Yasmin Mrabet	(substituted off) 74'
LM	7	Ghizlane Chebbak (c)
MF	10	Najat Badri
RM	18	Sanaâ Mssoudy
FW	19	Sakina Ouzraoui Diki
FW	9	Ibtissam Jraïdi	(substituted off) 74'
Substitutions:
MF	5	Sarah Kassi	(substituted on) 74'
CF	20	Imane Saoud	(substituted on) 74'
FW	20	Kenza Chapelle	(substituted on) 90'
CM	6	Élodie Nakkach
DF	4	Siham Boukhami
DF	13	Sabah Seghir
MF	16	Anissa Lahmari
GK	22	Inès Arouaissa
GK	23	Hind Hasnaoui
Manager:
(Spain) Jorge Vilda

Formation: 4–3–3
GK	16	Chiamaka Nnadozie
RB	22	Michelle Alozie	(substituted off) 90'
CB	3	Osinachi Ohale
CB	14	Oluwatosin Demehin
LB	5	Ashleigh Plumptre
MF	18	Halimatu Ayinde	(substituted off) 58'
MF	13	Deborah Abiodun
FW	20	Folashade Ijamilusi	(substituted off) 78'
MF	15	Rasheedat Ajibade (c)
FW	19	Chinwendu Ihezuo	(substituted off) 58'
CF	6	Esther Okoronkwo	(substituted off) 90'
Substitutions:
MF	12	Jennifer Echegini	(substituted on) 58'
FW	2	Rinsola Babajide	(substituted on) 58'
FW	8	Asisat Oshoala	(substituted on) 78'
DF	4	Shukurat Oladipo	(substituted on) 90'
DF	11	Sikiratu Isa	(substituted on) 90'
GK	1	Tochukwu Oluehi
MF	7	Toni Payne
FW	9	Ifeoma Onumonu
MF	10	Christy Ucheibe
FW	24	Chioma Okafor
Manager:
Justine Madugu

Woman of the Match: Esther Okoronkwo (Nigeria)

Assistant referees:

- Alice Umutesi (Rwanda)
- Tabara Mbodji (Senegal)

Fourth official:

- Josephine Wanjiku (Kenya)

Reserve assistant referee: Video assistant referee:

- Salima Mukansanga Guirat (Rwanda)

Assistant video assistant referees:

- Letticia Viana (Eswatini)
- Diana Chikotesha (Zambia)

Match rules

- 90 minutes
- 30 minutes of extra time if necessary
- Penalty shoot-out if scores still level
- Maximum of fifteen named substitutes
- Maximum of five substitutions, with a sixth allowed in extra time

=== Statistics ===
First half
Statistic	Morocco	Nigeria
Goals scored	2	0
Total shots	6	5
Shots on target	2	1
Saves	1	0
Ball possession	43%	57%
Corner kicks	1	4
Fouls committed	7	3
Offsides	0	0
Yellow cards	0	0
Red cards	0	0

Second half
Statistic	Morocco	Nigeria
Goals scored	0	3
Total shots	4	9
Shots on target	1	4
Saves	1	1
Ball possession	49%	51%
Corner kicks	2	1
Fouls committed	6	3
Offsides	0	2
Yellow cards	0	0
Red cards	0	0

Overall
Statistic	Morocco	Nigeria
Goals scored	2	3
Total shots	10	14
Shots on target	3	5
Saves	2	1
Ball possession	46%	54%
Corner kicks	3	5
Fouls committed	13	6
Offsides	0	2
Yellow cards	0	0
Red cards	0	0

== Post-match ==
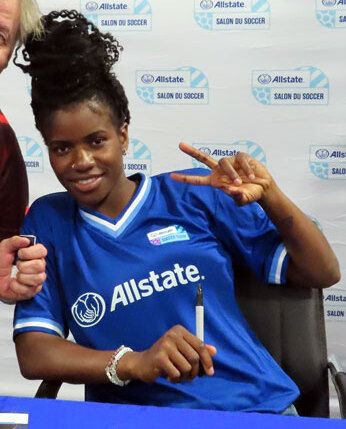
Nigeria's Esther Okoronkwo was awarded the player of the match after scoring and then assisting the two goals that won Nigeria the tournament.

CAF president Patrice Motsepe and FIFA President Gianni Infantino were present on the pitch stage during the awards ceremony to hand out the medals and present the trophy to the Nigerian captain Ajibade.

Nigeria forward Esther Okoronkwo was named the player of the match for the final. Teammate Rasheedat Ajibade was named the player of the tournament by CAF's technical observers. Moroccan forward Chebbak became the tournament's top scorer with five goals. Okoronkwo, Jraidi, Ajibade and Chebbak were among the players named to the Team of the Tournament; composed largely of those who played in the final, the team also included goalkeeper Chiamaka Nnadozie and defender Michelle Alozie.

Two Nigerian players (Francisca Ordega and Osinachi Ohale) equalled the record of winning five Wafcon titles. Nigerian's Asisat Oshoala won her fourth Wafcon title.

=== Records ===
Nigeria won their tenth Women's African cup of Nations title in the 13 editions of the competition, whilst maintaining their perfect win rate at WAFCON finals 1998, 2000, 2002, 2004, 2006, 2010, 2014, 2016, 2018 and 2024. Nigeria's win also marks the first time a national team won a WAFCON final after trailing by 2 goals. Nigeria's victory meant that they have now beaten a third host nation in a Wafcon final following successes over South Africa and Cameroon in 2000 and 2016 respectively. As winners, Nigeria was awarded a prize of U$1 million.

With this triumph, Nigeria became the first women's national team (across all continents) to reach 10 continental titles.
