= Diana Chikotesha =

Zambian football referee

- Chikotesha in 2022
- Born: 1990 or 1991 (age 35–36); Petauke District, Zambia

Domestic
Years	League	Role
2009–present	Football in Zambia	Assistant referee

International
Years	League	Role
2014–present	FIFA listed	Assistant referee

Diana Chikotesha (born 1990 or 1991) is a Zambian football assistant referee who has been listed on the FIFA International Referees List since 2014.

== Career ==
Chikotesha was born in Petauke District, in the Eastern Province of Zambia. She decided to pursue refereeing in 2009, stating later that it was difficult as a girl to pursue an athletic career due to African culture barriers and male-dominated fields. In 2014, Chikotesha earned her FIFA badge and began taking part in tournaments of the Confederation of African Football (CAF).

Among her most prominent matches are the 2023 Africa Cup of Nations final between Nigeria and Ivory Coast under referee Dahane Beida, and the 2024 Women's Africa Cup of Nations final between Morocco and Nigeria under referee Antsino Twanyanyukwa. Other important competitions within CAF in which Chikothesha participated were the 2019 U-23 Africa Cup of Nations and the 2023 U-17 Africa Cup of Nations, both held in Egypt.

In 2022, Chikotesha was appointed to the 2022 FIFA U-20 Women's World Cup in Costa Rica and to the FIFA Women's World Cup in 2023 in Australia and New Zealand.

Chikothesa was bestowed with the Insignia of Honour by President Hakainde Hichilema for her participation at the women's tournament of the 2024 Summer Olympics in Paris.

== Personal life ==
Chikotesha has a master's degree in physical education and civic education and another degree in sport management, all obtained from the University of Zambia. She is also a faculty member at Rockview University in Lusaka.

== Selected performances ==
2023 Africa Cup of Nations – Ivory Coast
Date	Match	Result	Round	Venue
11 February 2024	Nigeria – Ivory Coast	1–2	Final	Alassane Ouattara Stadium, Abidjan
Football at the 2024 Summer Olympics – Women's tournament – Paris
Date	Match	Result	Round	Venue
25 July 2024	Spain – Japan	2–1	Group stage	Stade de la Beaujoire, Nantes
28 July 2024	France – Canada	1–2	Group stage	Stade Geoffroy-Guichard, Saint-Étienne
6 August 2024	United States – Germany	1–0 (a.e.t.)	Semifinal	Stade de Lyon, Décines-Charpieu
2024 Women's Africa Cup of Nations – Morocco
Date	Match	Result	Round	Venue
26 July 2025	Morocco – Nigeria	2–3	Final	Rabat Olympic Stadium, Rabat
