= Nigeria women's national football team =

Women's national football team representing Nigeria

Nigeria
- Nickname: Super Falcons
- Association: Nigeria Football Federation (NFF)
- Confederation: CAF (Africa)
- Sub-confederation: WAFU (West Africa)
- Head coach: Augustine Eguavoen (caretaker)
- Captain: Rasheedat Ajibade
- Most caps: Onome Ebi (109)
- Top scorer: Perpetua Nkwocha (80)
- Home stadium: Various
- FIFA code: NGA
First colours	Second colours

FIFA ranking
- Current: 43 ▼7 (20 October 2026)
- Highest: 23 (July – August 2003; August 2004; March 2005)
- Lowest: 46 (August 2022)

First international
- Nigeria 5–1 Ghana (Nigeria; 16 February 1991)

Biggest win
- Nigeria 15–0 Niger (Ivory Coast; 11 May 2019)

Biggest defeat
- Norway 8–0 Nigeria (Karlstad, Sweden; 6 June 1995); Germany 8–0 Nigeria (Leverkusen, Germany; 25 November 2010); France 8–0 Nigeria (Le Mans, France; 6 April 2018)

World Cup
- Appearances: 9 (first in 1991)
- Best result: Quarter-finals (1999)

Olympic Games
- Appearances: 4 (first in 2000)
- Best result: Quarter-finals (2004)

Women's Africa Cup of Nations
- Appearances: 13 (first in 1998)
- Best result: Champions (1998, 2000, 2002, 2004, 2006, 2010, 2014, 2016, 2018, 2024)

WAFU Zone B Women's Cup
- Appearances: 2 (first in 2018)
- Best result: Champions (2019)
Medal record
Women's Africa Cup of Nations
Gold medal – first place	1998 Nigeria
Gold medal – first place	2000 South Africa	Team
Gold medal – first place	2002 Nigeria	Team
Gold medal – first place	2004 South Africa
Gold medal – first place	2006 Nigeria
Gold medal – first place	2010 South Africa	Team
Gold medal – first place	2014 Namibia	Team
Gold medal – first place	2016 Cameroon	Team
Gold medal – first place	2018 Ghana	Team
Gold medal – first place	2024 Morocco	Team
Bronze medal – third place	2008 Equatorial Guinea	Team
African Games
Gold medal – first place	2003 Abuja	Team
Gold medal – first place	2007 Algiers	Team

The Nigeria women's national football team, (Note: Hausa: Kungiyar kwallon kafa ta mata ta Najeriya, Igbo: Ndị otu egwuregwu bọọlụ ụmụ nwanyị nke mba Naịjirịa) nicknamed the Super Falcons, represents Nigeria in international women's football and is controlled by the Nigeria Football Federation (NFF). The team is Africa's most successful international women's football team, having won a record ten Women's Africa Cup of Nations titles. The most recent came at the 2024 Women's Africa Cup of Nations, which was postponed by twelve months because of the 2024 Summer Olympics and played in Morocco from 5 to 26 July 2025; Nigeria recovered from a two-goal deficit to beat the hosts 3–2 in the final at the Olympic Stadium in Rabat on 26 July 2025. The team is also the only women's national team from the Confederation of African Football to have reached the quarterfinals in both the FIFA Women's World Cup and the Summer Olympics.

They qualified for every edition of the FIFA Women's World Cup until missing out on qualification for the 2027 edition, with their best performance at the 1999 FIFA Women's World Cup where they reached the quarterfinals.

Since FIFA rankings were established in 2003, the team has been ranked No. 1 in Africa and have never relinquished that position. Their 23rd position in the FIFA world ranking achieved on three occasions remains the highest they have ever attained.

== History ==
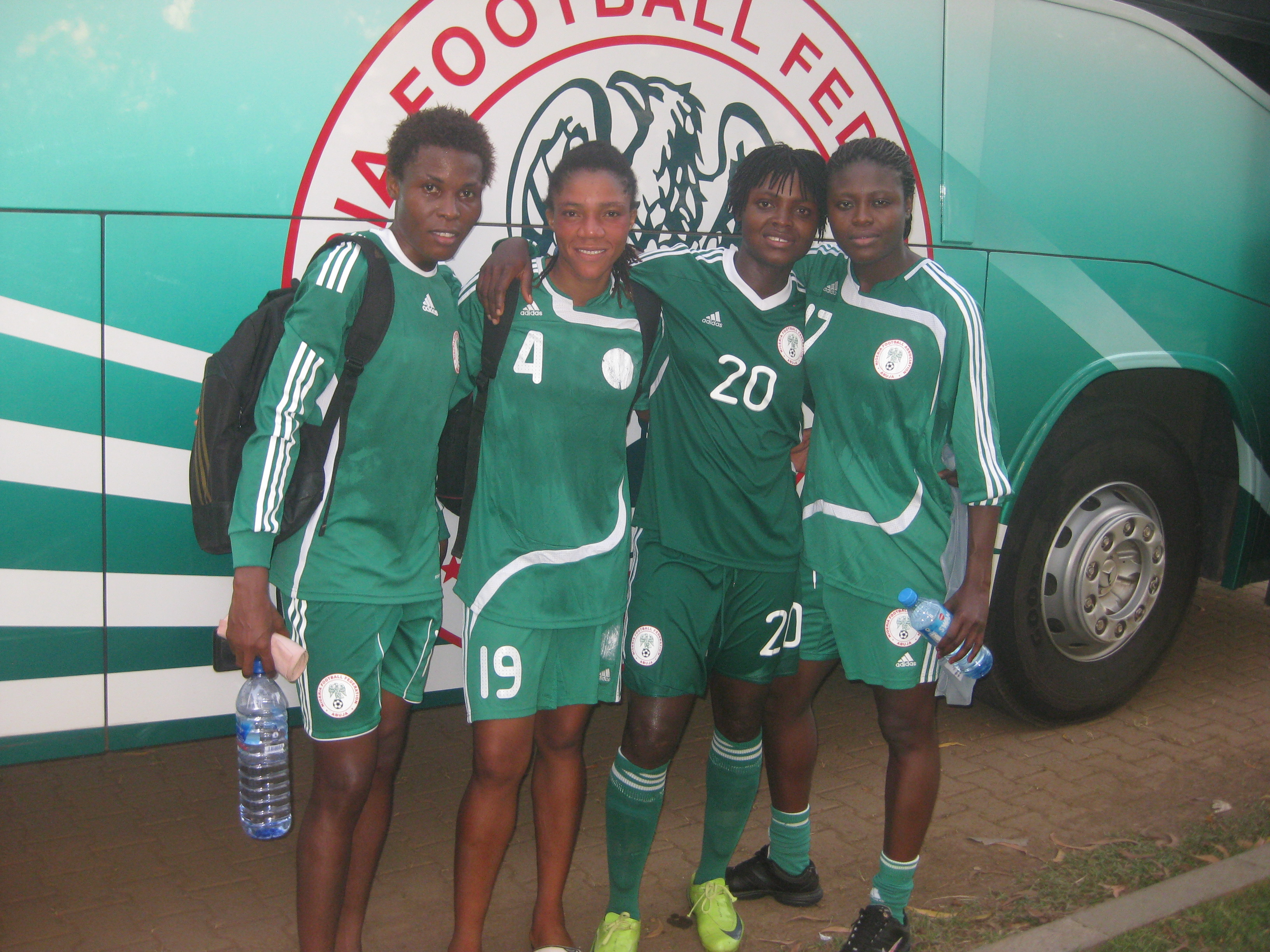
Nigeria women's national football team after a concluded training session

They won the first seven African championships, and through their first 20 years lost only five games to African competition: 12 December 2002 to Ghana in Warri, 3 June 2007 at Algeria, 12 August 2007 to Ghana in an Olympic qualifier, 25 November 2008 at Equatorial Guinea in the semis of the 2008 Women's African Football Championship and May 2011 at Ghana in an All Africa Games qualification match.

The Super Falcons have been able to dominate beyond Africa in such arenas as the FIFA Women's World Cup or the Olympic Games however. The team has been to every World Cup since 1991, but managed just once to finish in the top two. In 2003, the Super Falcons turned out to be the biggest disappointment of the first round, failing to score a single goal and losing all three Group A matches. They did little better in 2007, drawing only one of their Group B matches. However, they faced the group of death in both 2003 and 2007, grouped both times with rising Asian power North Korea, traditional European power Sweden, and a historic women's superpower in the USA.

Nigeria hosted the African women's championship finals for the third time in 2001 which were then canceled due to a severe outbreak of gang induced violence within the Nigerian area, replacing Gabon, which was initially granted the right to host but later pulled out citing financial difficulties, and won it for the seventh time in a row. Nigeria's Super Falcons and Ghana's Black Queens represented Africa in China for the 2007 FIFA Women's World Cup.

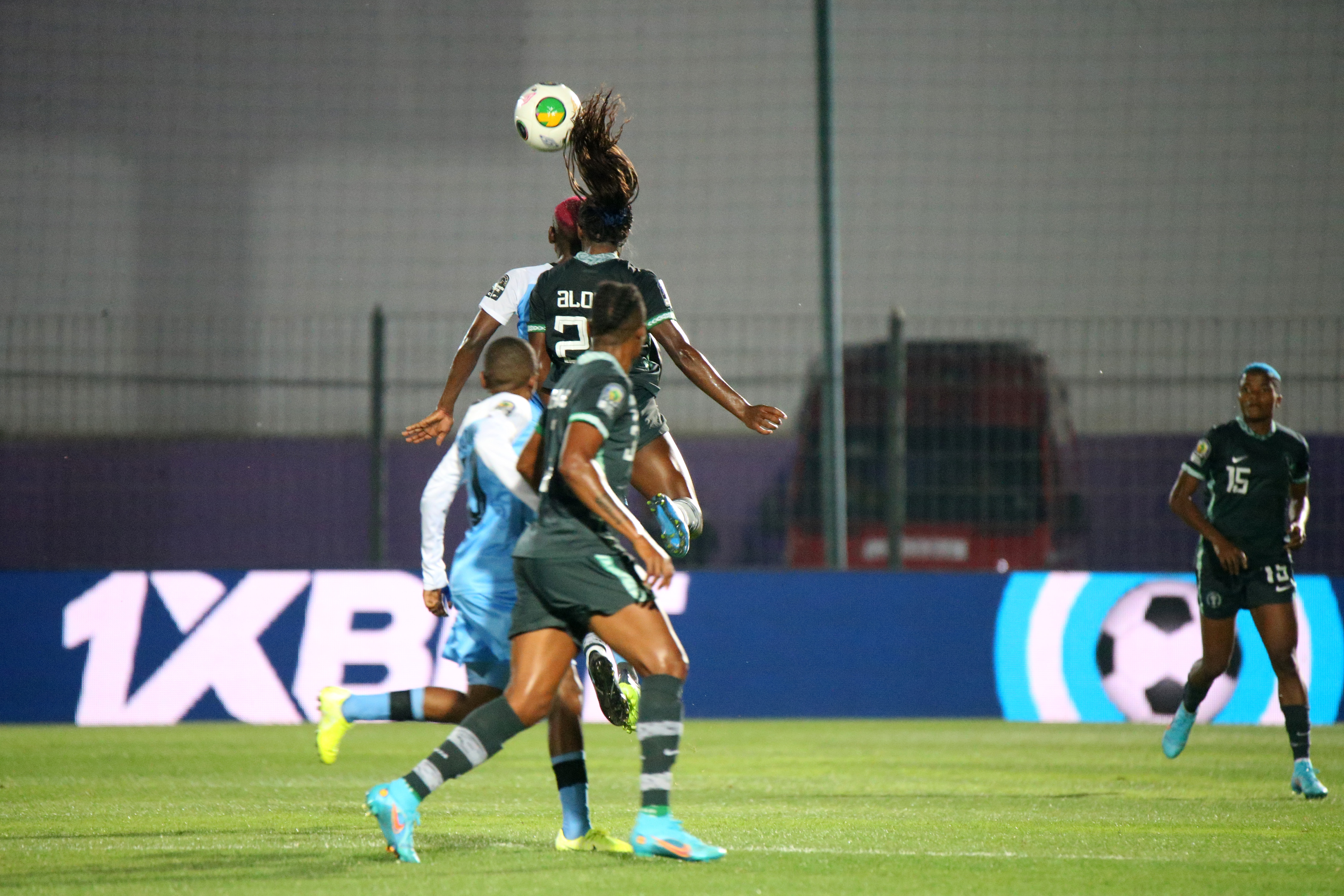
The Super falcons playing Botswana at the 2022 Women's Africa Cup of Nations

The "Falconets" are the country's junior team (U-20), which performed creditably in the 2006 FIFA U-20 Women's World Championship held in Russia when they beat Finland 8–0 before they were sent packing by Brazil in the Quarter-finals. They were the runner-up to Germany at the 2010 FIFA U-20 Women's World Cup. Nigeria also played in the 2014 FIFA U-20 Women's World Cup held in Canada and lost to Germany in the finals 0–1, Asisat Oshoala got both the golden ball and golden boot.

The "Flamingoes" are the country's cadet team (U-17), which qualified for the inaugural women's U-17 World Cup New Zealand 2008. Nigeria qualified for the 2019 FIFA Women's World Cup where they were placed in Group A with South Korea, Norway and hosts France.

=== 2023 FIFA Women's World Cup ===
Nigeria again maintained their record of appearing in all Women's Women Cup finals after qualifying for their ninth world cup. The 2023 FIFA Women’s World Cup was widely regarded as one of the best tournaments in the history of the Nigerian women's national team. Nigeria opened with a 0–0 draw against the reigning Olympic champions Canada with Goalkeeper Chiamaka Nnadozie outstanding performance making the difference. They went on to defeat co-hosts Australia 3–2 in what was arguably the biggest upset involving Nigeria at the tournament. Nigeria's last group game finished another 0–0 draw with Republic of Ireland, the draw secured second place and qualification for the Round of 16. Nigeria finished the group unbeaten and conceded only twice in three matches.

In the round of 16 Nigeria faced England with the match ending 0–0 at extended regulation time. Ultimately losing 4–2 on penalties after Desire Oparanozie and Michelle Alozie both missed their spot kicks.

The Super Falcons did not reach the quarterfinals, but their 2023 campaign demonstrated that they could compete tactically, physically, and mentally with the world's elite teams. For many Nigerian fans, it was the team's most complete World Cup performance since the historic quarterfinal run at the 1999 tournament.

=== 2025: Tenth WAFCON Title ===
In 2025, after playing through the tournament unbeaten Nigeria reached another WAFCON final for a record tenth time. Nigeria as the favorites to win the title and was placed in a relatively easy Group B along with Tunisia, Algeria and Botswana. Their game against Tunisia started with a comfortable 3–0 win, then sealed their quarter-finals spot with a 1–0 win over Botswana. They drew 0–0 with Algeria in their final group game to top their group, with most starters rested in the match.

Nigeria in the quarterfinals eliminated Zambia with a dominating 5–0 victory revenging the 1–0 loss in the previous edition's third place play-off. Nigeria advanced to the semis against then defending champions South Africa, where they won 2-1 and conceded their first goal of the tournament.

Nigeria then faced off with hosts Morocco and came out on top with a 3–2 scoreline for a record-extending 10th title in 13 editions of the competition. Goals from Esther Okoronkwo, Folashade Ijamilusi and Jennifer Echegini's winner in the 88th minute completed Nigeria's second half comeback after going down 2–0 in the first half.

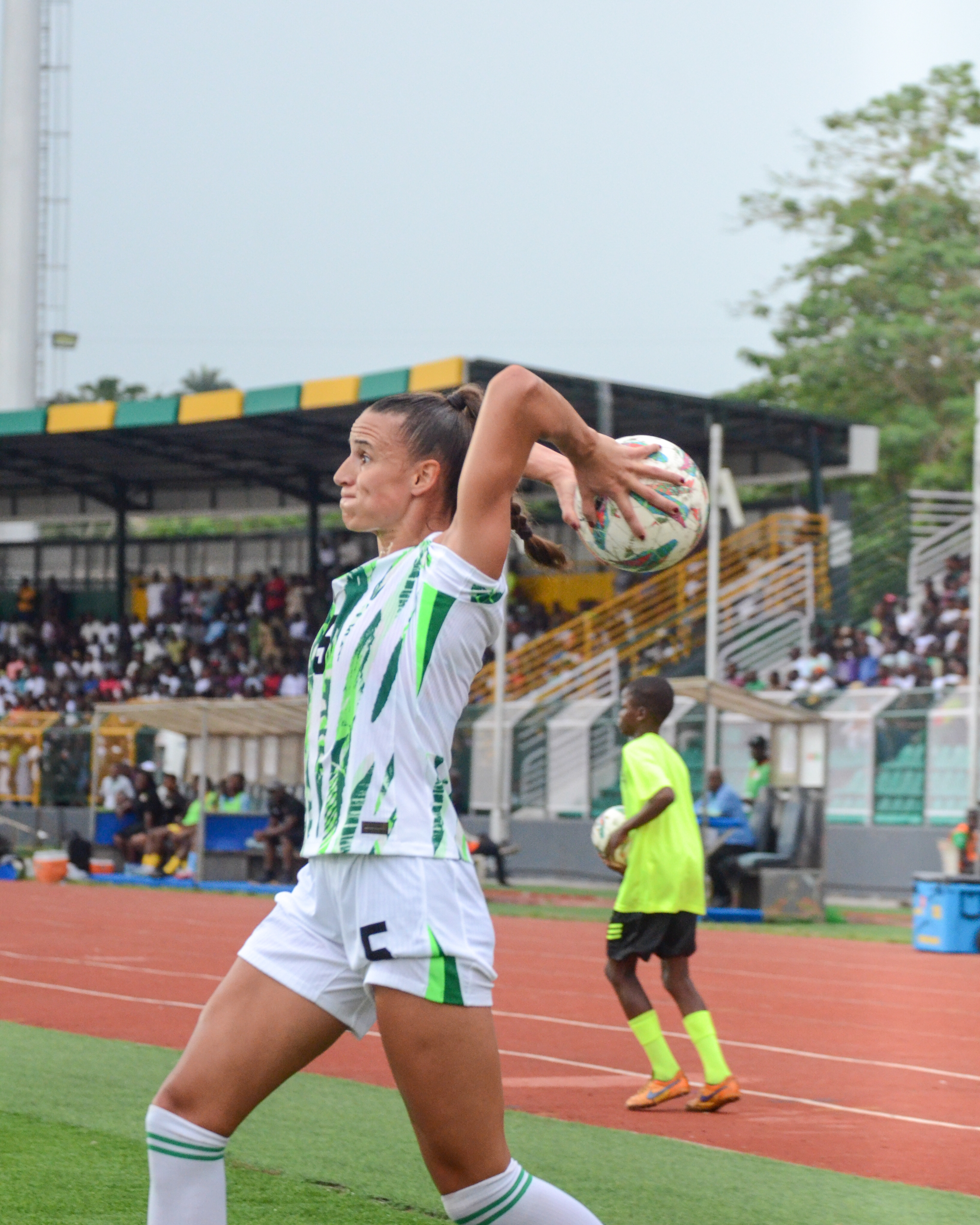
Ashleigh Plumptre executing a throw-in during a match for Nigeria

With the triumph, Nigeria became the first women's national team (across all continents) to reach 10 continental titles. Nigeria still extended their perfect winning streak in WAFCON finals.

=== 2026: WAFCON defeat ===
In 2026 WAFCON, Nigeria lost to Malawi with a score of 2-3. Although they win against Zambia and Egypt with the score of 1-0 and 6-2 in the next two group matches, they suffer a defeat against Cameroon with the score of 0-1 in quarters-final. This mark that Nigeria will not compete in Semi-Final of the tournament for the first time in history. Subsequently, 4 days later, Nigeria lost a decisive play-in match to South Africa 2-1 and failed to qualify for the FIFA Women's World Cup for the first time in history. South Africa advanced to the inter-confederation playoffs leading up to the 2027 edition of the FIFA Women's World Cup.

== Team image ==
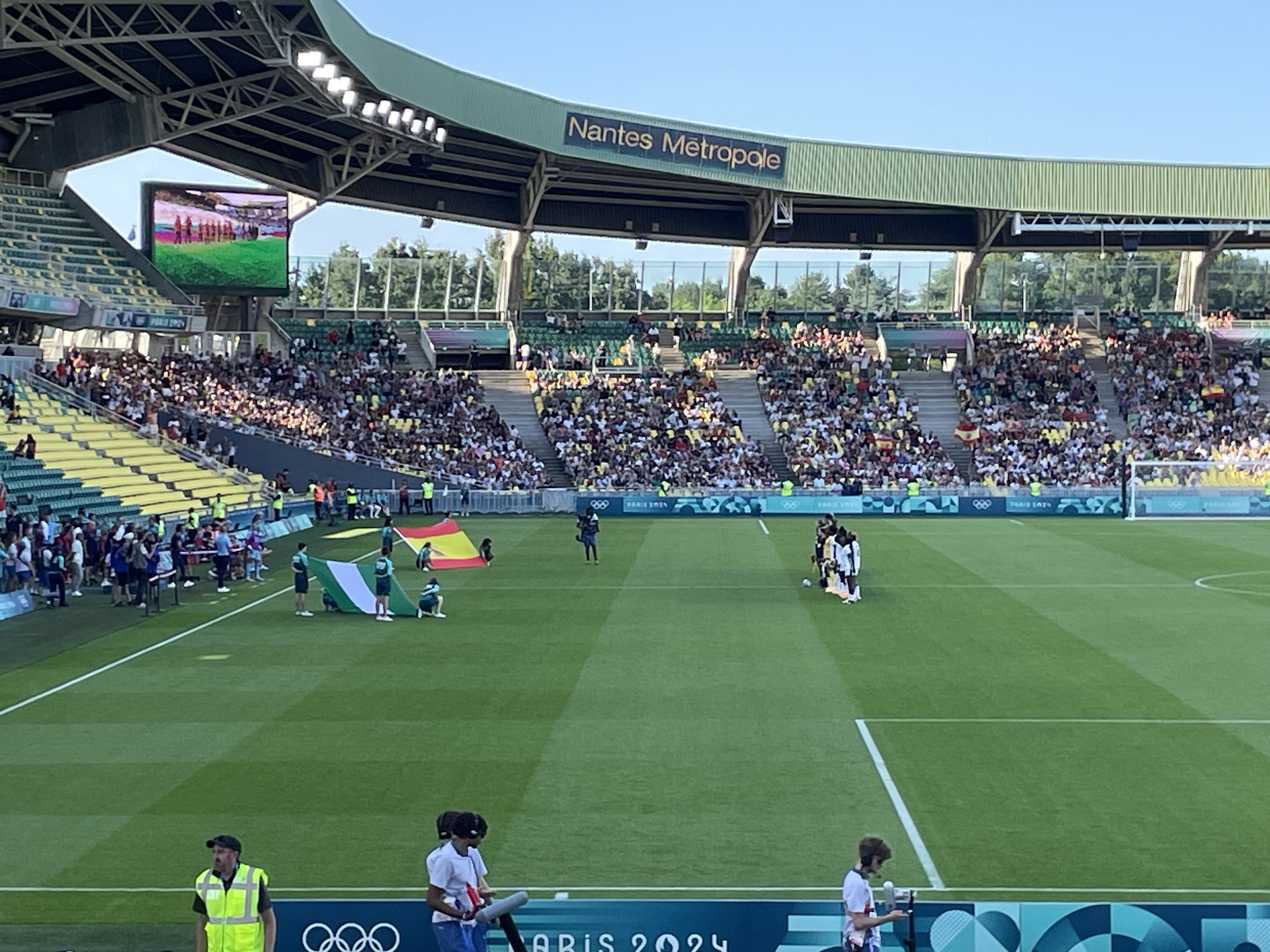
Nigeria vs Spain on July 28, 2024, during the Paris 2024 Olympic Games

=== Nicknames ===
The Nigeria women's national football team has been known or nicknamed as the "Super Falcons".

== Home stadium ==
The Nigerian women's national football team has no national stadium. The women's team play their home matches in different stadiums throughout the country. Most home games have been held in Moshood Abiola National Stadium (formerly known as National Stadium, Abuja) which serves as the official home stadium of the Men's team. Other venues which has hosted some of their matches are the MKO Abiola Stadium, Onikan Stadium and Remo Stars Stadium.

== Labour disputes ==
The Super Falcons have consistently clashed with the Nigeria Football Federation (NFF) over back pay, unpaid bonuses, daily allowances, and poor facilities. These disputes have resulted in sit‑in protests, training boycotts, or threats to boycott several key tournaments:

- 2004 – Following their WAFCON victory in Johannesburg, players staged a three-day sit-in at their hotel over unpaid bonuses. President Olusegun Obasanjo intervened and paid ₦1 million to each player.
- 2007 – At the FIFA Women's World Cup, the team boycotted training over unpaid back pay after their group match against Sweden. The dispute was resolved ahead of their final group match against the United States.
- 2016 – After winning AWCON, players refused to leave their hotel for 13 days and marched to the National Assembly demanding unpaid bonuses (~US$23,650 per player).
- 2019 – After their World Cup exit in France, players staged a sit-in protest in their hotel over unpaid bonuses and allowances.
- 2022 – During WAFCON in Morocco, the Falcons boycotted training ahead of the third-place playoff due to unpaid match bonuses.
- 2023 – Ahead of the FIFA Women's World Cup, the NFF canceled players’ match bonuses and delayed grant disbursements. FIFPRO announced support for the players. Head coach Randy Waldrum accused the NFF of withholding salaries and mismanaging funds, which led to internal backlash.

== FIFA world rankings ==
As of 9 June 2023

Worst Ranking Best Ranking Worst Mover Best Mover

Nigeria's FIFA world rankings
Rank	Year	Matches played	Won	Lost	Drawn	Best		Worst	
Rank	Year	Matches played	Won	Lost	Drawn	Rank	Move	Rank	Move
41	2021	6	3	2	1	37	▲0	41	▼1
45	2022	10	5	3	2	39	▼2	46	▼5
40	2023	5	3	2	0	40	▼1	45	▲1

== Results and fixtures ==
The following is a list of match results in the last 12 months, as well as any future matches that have been scheduled.

Legend

Win Draw Lose Fixture

=== 2025 ===
24 October 2025 CAF WAFCON 2026 qualifying	Benin	0–2	Nigeria	Lomé (Togo)
15:00 UTC+1		Report (FIFA)	Ihezuo 25'; Okoronkwo 45+2'	Stadium: Stade de Kégué; Referee: Fatou Ngum (Gambia)

28 October 2025 CAF WAFCON 2026 qualifying	Nigeria	1–1	Benin	Abeokuta
16:00 UTC+1	Plumptre 12'	Report (FIFA)	Djibril 61'	Stadium: MKO Abiola Stadium; Referee: Dominique Hanjavola (Madagascar)
Note: Nigeria won 3–1 on aggregate.

=== 2026 ===
28 February Friendly	Cameroon	1–0	Nigeria	Yaoundé, Cameroon
16:00 UTC+1	Mbomozomo 90'			Stadium: Military Stadium

3 March Friendly	Cameroon	1–3	Nigeria	Yaoundé, Cameroon
16:00 UTC+1	Meva 7'		Ihezuo 26'; Babajide 43'; Alozie 64'	Stadium: Military Stadium

5 June Friendly	Nigeria	2–1	Senegal	Ikenne, Nigeria
15:00 UTC+0	Oshoala 32' (pen.); Payne 41'	Report	Pène 86'	Stadium: Remo Stars Stadium; Referee: Juliet Appiah (Ghana)

8 June Friendly	Nigeria	3–0	Senegal	Ikenne, Nigeria
15:00 UTC+0	Omewa 49', 53'; Oshoala 66'	Report		Stadium: Remo Stars Stadium

22 July Friendly	Nigeria	2–1	Tanzania	Casablanca, Morocco
18:00 (UTC+01:00)	Ajibade 15'; Okoronkwo 89'	Report	Clement 79'	Stadium: Lenoria Sports Complex

28 July 2026 WAFCON GS	Nigeria	2–3	Malawi	Rabat, Morocco
21:00 (UTC+01:00)	Ajibade 90+2'; Kanu 90+9'		Chaŵinga 73', 90+5'; Chaŵinga 79'	Stadium: Al Medina Stadium; Referee: Aline Umutoni (Rwanda)

1 August 2026 WAFCON GS	Nigeria	1–0	Zambia	Rabat, Morocco
21:00 (UTC+01:00)	Oshoala 8'			Stadium: Al Medina Stadium; Referee: josephine wanjiku (Football Kenya Federation)

5 August 2026 WAFCON GS	Egypt	2–6	Nigeria	Rabat, Morocco
21:00 (UTC+01:00)	Ghazi 45+9' (pen.), 84'		Oshoala 21' (pen.); Monday 45+1'; Kanu 57'; Ucheibe 81' (pen.); Ajibade 90+1' (pen.); Omewa 90+9'	Stadium: Rabat Olympic Stadium; Referee: Aline Umutoni (Rwanda)

9 August 2026 CAF WAFCON 2026 QF	Cameroon	1–0	Nigeria	Casablanca, Morocco
18:00 (UTC+01:00)	Nyadjou 19'			Stadium: Larbi Zaouli Stadium; Referee: Antsino Twanyanyukwa (Namibia)

13 August 2026 CAF WAFCON 2026 PIM	South Africa	2–1	Nigeria	Casablanca, Morocco
21:00 (UTC+01:00)	Kgatlana 56'; Jane 77'		Ucheibe 90+3' (pen.)	Stadium: Moulay Rachid Stadium; Referee: Aline Guimbang Etong (Cameroon)

9 October 2026 2028 Summer Olympic qualifying	Comoros	0–2	Nigeria	Ikenne, Nigeria
18:00 (UTC+01:00)		Report	Alozie 48'; Kanu 60'	Stadium: Remo Stars Stadium; Referee: Henriette Byukusenge (Rwanda)

13 October 2026 2028 Summer Olympic qualifying	Nigeria	5–0	Comoros	Ikenne, Nigeria
16:00 (UTC+01:00)	Payne 41', 63'; Kanu 58', 66'; Ucheibe 71' (pen.)			Stadium: Remo Stars Stadium

30 November 2026 Friendly	Algeria	v	Nigeria	Algiers, Algeria
18:00 (UTC+01:00)				Stadium: Stade du 5 Juillet

4 December 2026 Friendly	Algeria	v	Nigeria	Tizi Ouzou, Algeria
17:00 (UTC+01:00)				Stadium: Hocine Aït Ahmed Stadium

== Coaching staff ==
=== Current coaching staff ===
Following the dismissal of Justin Madugu after the 2026 WAFCON failure, the NFF appointed its erstwhile technical director and former Super Eagles defender Augustine Eguavoen as interim coach, to be assisted by Christopher Danjuma, former international player Ayisat Yusuf and goalkeeper trainer, Olatunji Baruwa.

As of 22 November 2026

Name	Role	Ref.
(Nigeria) Augustine Eguavoen	Interim Head coach	
(Nigeria) Christopher Danjuma	Interim Assistant coaches	
(Nigeria) Ayisat Yusuf	Interim Assistant coaches	
(Nigeria) Olatunji Baruwa	Goalkeeping coach	

=== Manager history ===
Name	Start date	End date	Notes	Ref
(Netherlands) Jo Bonfrere			managed Nigeria at 1991 FIFA Women's World Cup, concurrently with the men's national team of Nigeria.	
(Nigeria) Paul Hamilton			regarded as the first coach of the women national team; managed Nigeria at 1995 FIFA Women's World Cup	
(Nigeria) Ismaila Mabo			managed Nigeria to quarter finals at 1999 FIFA Women's World Cup, thus regarded as the most successful coach; led Nigeria to 2000 Olympics and 2004 Olympics	
(Nigeria) Samuel Okpodu	2002		managed Nigeria at 2003 FIFA Women's World Cup	
(Nigeria) Godwin Izilien			managed Nigeria to win 2004 African Women's Championship	
(Nigeria) Ntiero Effiom			managed Nigeria at 2007 FIFA Women's World Cup; led Nigeria to win 2003 All-Africa Games	
(Nigeria) Joseph Ladipo			managed Nigeria at 2008 Olympics; led Nigeria to win 2007 All-Africa Games; managed Nigeria to third-place finish at 2008 African Women's Championship	
(Nigeria) Uche Eucharia		October 2011	managed Nigeria to win 2010 African Women's Championship; managed Nigeria at 2011 FIFA Women's World Cup	
(Nigeria) Kadiri Ikhana	April 2012	November 2012	led Nigeria to fourth place at 2012 African Women's Championship	
(Nigeria) Edwin Okon		June 2015	managed Nigeria to win 2014 African Women's Championship; managed Nigeria at 2015 FIFA Women's World Cup	
(Nigeria) Christopher Danjuma		September 2015	led Nigeria to fourth place at 2015 All-Africa Games	
(Nigeria) Florence Omagbemi	February 2016	December 2016	led Nigeria to win 2016 Women's Africa Cup of Nations	
(Sweden) Thomas Dennerby	January 2018	October 2019	led Nigeria to win at 2019 WAFU Zone B Women's Cup	
(United States) Randy Waldrum	2020	October 2023		
(Nigeria) Justine Madugu	November 2023	November 2023	Interim Coach	
(United States) Randy Waldrum	November 2023	September 2024		
(Nigeria) Justine Madugu	September 2024	August 2026	led Nigeria to win 2024 Women's Africa Cup of Nations	
(Nigeria) Augustine Eguavoen	September 2026		Interim Coach	

== Players ==
=== Current squad ===
The following players were called up for the 2028 Olympics second round qualifying double-header against Comoros. However, Ashleigh Plumptre and Asisat Oshoala withdrew due to injury and for personal reasons, respectively; Benfica duo of Blessing Demehin and Flourish Sabastine withdrew due to residency issues, while interim coach Augustine Eguavoen released Kemi Adegbuyi and Favour Nkwocha to the Under-17 team for the 2026 FIFA U-17 Women's World Cup. Following the withdrawals, Eguavoen extended invitations to Blessing Okpe, Favour Omenazu, and Folashade Ijamilusi.

Caps and goals correct as of October 13, 2026, after the two matches against Comoros.

No.	Pos.	Player	Date of birth (age)	Caps	Goals	Club
	GK	Chiamaka Nnadozie	8 December 2000 (aged 25)	58	0	(The Football Association) Brighton & Hove Albion
	GK	Comfort Erhabor	26 April 2005 (aged 21)	2	0	(The Football Association) Crystal Palace
	GK	Christiana Uzoma	20 December 2008 (aged 17)	0	0	(Nigeria Football Federation) Edo Queens
	DF	Shukurat Oladipo	22 September 2004 (aged 22)	23	0	(Italian Football Federation) Roma
	DF	Glory Ogbonna	25 December 1998 (aged 27)	21	0	(Turkish Football Federation) Beşiktaş JK
	DF	Michelle Alozie	28 April 1997 (aged 29)	57	4	(United States Soccer Federation) Chicago Stars
	DF	Farida Abdulwahab	26 October 2007 (aged 19)	1	0	(Nigeria Football Federation) Nasarawa Amazons
	DF	Glory Edet	26 February 2001 (aged 25)	0	0	(Nigeria Football Federation) Bayelsa Queens
	DF	Tumininu Adeshina	22 April 2006 (aged 20)	0	0	(Nigeria Football Federation) Edo Queens
	MF	Christy Ucheibe	25 December 2000 (aged 25)	34	4	(Saudi Arabian Football Federation) Al-Hilal
	MF	Joy Igbokwe	6 May 2006 (aged 20)	2	0	(Nigeria Football Federation) Nasarawa Amazons
	MF	Jennifer Echegini	22 March 2001 (aged 25)	35	3	(French Football Federation) Paris Saint-Germain
	MF	Toni Payne	22 April 1995 (aged 31)	54	4	(Italian Football Federation) Inter Milan
	MF	Suliat Abideen	3 December 2001 (aged 24)	2	0	(Turkish Football Federation) Fenerbahçe S.K.
	MF	Favour Omenazu	8 March 2002 (aged 24)	0	0	(The Football Association) MK Dons
	MF	Rasheedat Ajibade (Captain)	7 December 1999 (aged 26)	53	23	(French Football Federation) Paris Saint-Germain
	FW	Joy Omewa	1 December 2002 (aged 23)	7	3	(Swedish Football Association) BK Häcken
	FW	Folashade Ijamilusi	30 May 2001 (aged 25)	18	5	(Chinese Football Association) Liaoning Shenbei Hefeng
	FW	Uchenna Kanu	20 June 1997 (aged 29)	45	26	(Mexican Football Federation) Cruz Azul
	FW	Gift Monday	9 December 2001 (aged 24)	21	6	(United States Soccer Federation) Boston Legacy FC
	FW	Blessing Nkor	1 October 2003 (aged 23)	3	0	(Football Federation of Belarus) Dinamo Brest
	FW	Blessing Okpe	1 October 2003 (aged 23)	1	0	(Football Federation of Belarus) Dnepr Mogilev
	FW	Janet Akekoromowei	6 November 2007 (aged 18)	1	0	(Portuguese Football Federation) S.L. Benfica

=== Recent call-ups ===
Following players have been called up to a squad in the past 12 months.

Pos.	Player	Date of birth (age)	Caps	Goals	Club	Latest call-up
GK	Udoka Unachukwu	17 December 2005 (age 20)	1	0	(Nigeria) Nasarawa Amazons	v. Benin, 31 October 2025
GK	Fatima Oloko	2 February 2008 (age 18)	0	0	(Nigeria) Abia Angels	2026 Women's Africa Cup of Nations
GK	Anderline Mgbechi	30 November 2005 (age 20)	1	0	(Nigeria) Delta Queens	v. Cameroon, 3 March 2026
DF	Osinachi Ohale^{RET}	12 December 1991 (aged 34)	87	4	(Italy) Como	2026 Women's Africa Cup of Nations
DF	Oluwatosin Demehin	13 March 2002 (age 24)	36	1	(Portugal) Benfica	v. Comoros; October 9, 2026^{WD}
DF	Rofiat Imuran	17 June 2004 (aged 22)	11	0	(England) Aston Villa	2026 Women's Africa Cup of Nations
DF	Blessing Ilivieda	20 October 2002 (age 24)	5	0	(Nigeria) Edo Queens	v. Benin, 31 October 2025
DF	Miracle Usani	20 June 2007 (age 19)	4	0	(Nigeria) Edo Queens	v. Benin, 31 October 2025
DF	Ashleigh Plumptre	8 May 1998 (age 28)	27	1	(Saudi Arabia) Al-Ittihad	v. Comoros, 9 October 2026^{INJ}
DF	Chidinma Okeke	11 August 2000 (age 26)	13	0	(Mexico) Club América	v. Cameroon, 3 March 2026
DF	Sikiratu Isa	10 July 1997 (aged 29)	10	0	(Israel) Bnot Netanya	2026 Women's Africa Cup of Nations
MF	Deborah Abiodun^{INJ}	2 November 2003 (aged 22)	29	0	(United States) Washington Spirit	2026 Women's Africa Cup of Nations
MF	Halimatu Ayinde	16 May 1995 (aged 31)	48	1	(Sweden) BK Häcken	2026 Women's Africa Cup of Nations
MF	Taiwo Tewogbola Afolabi	2 March 2007 (age 19)	2	0	(Nigeria) FC Robo Queens	v. Benin, 31 October 2025
MF	Ngozi Okobi-Okeoghene	16 May 1995 (age 31)	29	4	(Canada) Ottawa Rapid	v. Senegal, 10 June 2026
MF	Precious Christopher	14 August 2001 (age 25)	2	0	(Tanzania) Yanga Princess	v. Cameroon, 3 March 2026
FW	Esther Okoronkwo^{INJ}	22 March 1997 (aged 29)	28	11	(Canada) AFC Toronto	2026 Women's Africa Cup of Nations
FW	Rinsola Babajide	17 June 1998 (aged 28)	23	2	(Italy) AS Roma	2026 Women's Africa Cup of Nations
FW	Asisat Oshoala	9 October 1994 (aged 32)	74	40	(Saudi Arabia) Al-Hilal	v. Comoros, 9 October 2026^{WD}
FW	Francisca Ordega	19 October 1993 (aged 33)	54	7	(Saudi Arabia) Al-Ittihad	2026 Women's Africa Cup of Nations
FW	Chinwendu Ihezuo	30 April 1997 (aged 29)	27	8	(Mexico) Pachuca	2026 Women's Africa Cup of Nations
FW	Kafayat Mafisere	21 May 2006 (age 20)	0	0	(Nigeria) Rivers Angels	v. Benin, 31 October 2025^{PRE}
FW	Flourish Sabastine	20 October 2004 (age 22)	1	0	(Portugal) Benfica	v. Comoros; October 9, 2026^{WD}
Notes: ^{INJ} = Withdrew due to injury; ^{PRE} = Preliminary squad / standby

=== Previous squads ===
Bold indicates winning squads

FIFA Women's World Cup

- 1991 FIFA Women's World Cup squad
- 1995 FIFA Women's World Cup squad
- 1999 FIFA Women's World Cup squad
- 2003 FIFA Women's World Cup squad
- 2007 FIFA Women's World Cup squad
- 2011 FIFA Women's World Cup squad
- 2015 FIFA Women's World Cup squad
- 2019 FIFA Women's World Cup squad
- 2023 FIFA Women's World Cup squads

Olympic Games

- 2000 Summer Olympics squad
- 2004 Summer Olympics squad
- 2008 Summer Olympics squad

Africa Women Cup of Nations

- **2000 African Women's Championship squad**
- **2010 African Women's Championship squad**
- 2012 African Women's Championship squad
- **2014 African Women's Championship squad**
- **2016 Africa Women Cup of Nations squad**
- **2018 Africa Women Cup of Nations squad**
- 2022 Africa Women Cup of Nations squad
- **2024 Women's Africa Cup of Nations squad**
- 2026 Women's Africa Cup of Nations squad

=== Captains ===
- **Desire Oparanozie** (2019)
- **Asisat Oshoala** (2019–2022)
- **Onome Ebi** (2022–2025)
- **Rasheedat Ajibade** (2025–present)

== Records ==
*Active players in bold, statistics as of November 2020.

=== Most capped players ===
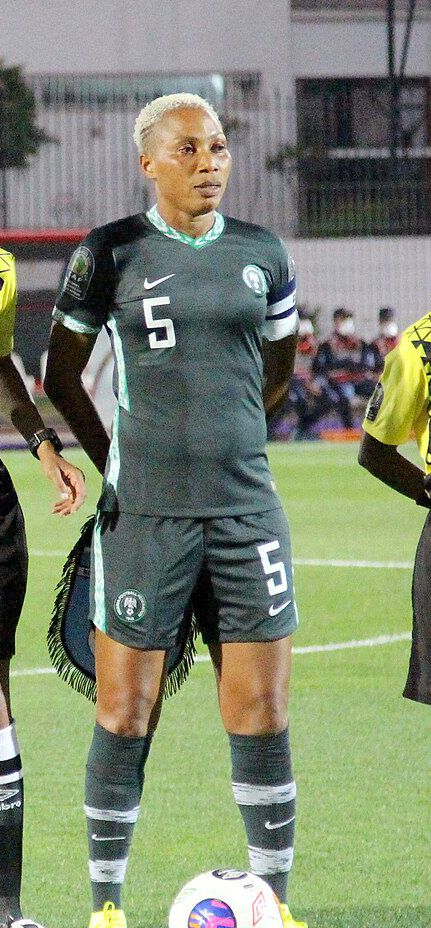
Onome Ebi is the most capped Nigeria player with 109 caps.

#	Name	Caps	Goals	Career
1	Onome Ebi	109	3	2003–2025
2	Maureen Mmadu	52	15	1995–2007

=== Top goalscorers ===
#	Name	Goals	Caps	Ratio	Career
1	Perpetua Nkwocha	80	99	0.81	1999–2015
2	Asisat Oshoala	37	61	0.61	2015–
3	Desire Oparanozie	22	35	0.63	2010–2022
4	Uchenna Kanu	22	40	0.55	2019–
5	Stella Mbachu	20	88	0.23	1999–2014
6	Cynthia Uwak	18	40	0.45	2004–2010
7	Florence Omagbemi	17	60	0.28	1991–2004
8	Kikelomo Ajayi	16	55	0.29	1998–2006
9	Maureen Mmadu	15	52	0.29	1995–2007
10	Onome Ebi	3	109	0.03	2003–2025

== Honours ==
=== Major competitions ===
- FIFA Women's World Cup
  - Quarterfinals: 1999
- Olympic Games
  - Quarterfinals: 2004
- Africa Women Cup of Nations
  - Champions (10): 1998, 2000, 2002, 2004, 2006, 2010, 2014, 2016, 2018, 2024
  - (bronze) Third place (1): 2008

=== Continental ===
- African Women's Championship
  - (gold) Champions (2): 1991, 1995
- African Games^{1}
  - (gold) Gold medalists (2): 2003, 2007
  - Fourth-place: 2015

=== Regional ===
- WAFU Zone B Women's Cup
  - (gold) Champions (1): 2019
  - (bronze) Third place (1): 2018

=== Friendly ===
- 2019 Four Nations Tournament (women's football)
  - (bronze) Third-place
- 2021 Turkish Women's Cup
  - (gold) Champions
- 2023 Women's Revelations Cup
  - (bronze) Third-place

=== Awards ===
- African Women's National Team of the Year
  - (gold) Winners: (2010, 2014, 2016, 2018, 2023, 2024)
1. Competition organized by the Association of National Olympic Committees of Africa, officially not recognized by FIFA.

=== Summary ===
Competition	1st place, gold medalist(s)	2nd place, silver medalist(s)	3rd place, bronze medalist(s)	Total
FIFA Women's World Cup	0	0	0	0
Olympic Games	0	0	0	0
Women's Africa Cup of Nations	10	0	1	11
African Games	2	0	0	2
WAFU Women's Cup	1^{s}	0	1	2
Total	13	0	2	15

- record
- ^{s} shared record

== Competitive record ==
Champions
Runners-up
Third place
Fourth place
Tournament played fully or partially on home soil

=== FIFA Women's World Cup ===
FIFA Women's World Cup record										FIFA Women's World Cup Qualification record					
Year	Result	Position	Pld	W	D	L	GF	GA	Squad	Pld	W	D	L	GF	GA
(China) 1991	Group stage	10th	3	0	0	3	0	7	Squad	Via Women's Africa Cup of Nations					
(Sweden) 1995	Group stage	11th	3	0	1	2	5	14	Squad	Via Women's Africa Cup of Nations					
(United States) 1999	Quarter-finals	7th	4	2	0	2	8	12	Squad	Via Women's Africa Cup of Nations					
(United States) 2003	Group stage	15th	3	0	0	3	0	11	Squad	Via Women's Africa Cup of Nations					
(China) 2007	Group stage	13th	3	0	1	2	1	4	Squad	Via Women's Africa Cup of Nations					
(Germany) 2011	Group stage	9th	3	1	0	2	1	2	Squad	Via Women's Africa Cup of Nations					
(Canada) 2015	Group stage	21st	3	0	1	2	3	6	Squad	Via Women's Africa Cup of Nations					
(France) 2019	Round of 16	16th	4	1	0	3	2	7	Squad	Via Women's Africa Cup of Nations					
(Australia) (New Zealand) 2023	Round of 16	10th	4	1	3	0	3	2	Squad	Via Women's Africa Cup of Nations					
(Brazil) 2027	Did not qualify									Via Women's Africa Cup of Nations					
(Costa Rica) (Jamaica) (Mexico) (United States) 2031	To be determined									To be determined					
(United Kingdom) 2035	To be determined									To be determined					
Total:9/10	Quarter-finals	7th	30	5	6	19	23	65		–	–	–	–	–	–

FIFA Women's World Cup history
Year	Round	Date	Opponent	Result	Stadium
(China) 1991	Group stage	17 November	Germany	L 0–4	Jiangmen Stadium, Jiangmen
(China) 1991	Group stage	19 November	Italy	L 0–1	Zhongshan Stadium, Zhongshan
(China) 1991	Group stage	21 November	Chinese Taipei	L 0–2	Jiangmen Stadium, Jiangmen
(Sweden) 1995	Group stage	6 June	Norway	L 0–8	Tingvallen, Karlstad
(Sweden) 1995	Group stage	8 June	Canada	D 3–3	Olympia Stadion, Helsingborg
(Sweden) 1995	Group stage	10 June	England	L 2–3	Tingvallen, Karlstad
(United States) 1999	Group stage	20 June	North Korea	W 2–1	Rose Bowl, Pasadena
(United States) 1999	Group stage	24 June	United States	L 1–7	Soldier Field, Chicago
(United States) 1999	Group stage	27 June	Denmark	W 2–0	Jack Kent Cooke Stadium, Landover
(United States) 1999	Quarter-finals	1 July	Brazil	L 3–4 (a.e.t.)	Jack Kent Cooke Stadium, Landover
(United States) 2003	Group stage	20 September	North Korea	L 0–3	Lincoln Financial Field, Philadelphia
(United States) 2003	Group stage	25 September	United States	L 0–5	Lincoln Financial Field, Philadelphia
(United States) 2003	Group stage	28 September	Sweden	L 0–3	Columbus Crew Stadium, Columbus
(China) 2007	Group stage	11 September	Sweden	D 1–1	Chengdu Sports Center, Chengdu
(China) 2007	Group stage	14 September	North Korea	L 0–2	Chengdu Sports Center, Chengdu
(China) 2007	Group stage	18 September	United States	L 0–1	Hongkou Stadium, Shanghai
(Germany) 2011	Group stage	26 June	France	L 0–1	Rhein-Neckar-Arena, Sinsheim
(Germany) 2011	Group stage	30 June	Germany	L 0–1	Commerzbank-Arena, Frankfurt
(Germany) 2011	Group stage	5 July	Canada	W 1–0	Rudolf-Harbig-Stadion, Dresden
(Canada) 2015	Group stage	8 June	Sweden	D 3–3	Winnipeg Stadium, Winnipeg
(Canada) 2015	Group stage	12 June	Australia	L 0–2	Winnipeg Stadium, Winnipeg
(Canada) 2015	Group stage	16 June	United States	L 0–1	BC Place, Vancouver
(France) 2019	Group stage	8 June	Norway	L 0–3	Stade Auguste-Delaune, Reims
(France) 2019	Group stage	12 June	South Korea	W 2–0	Stade des Alpes, Grenoble
(France) 2019	Group stage	17 June	France	L 0–1	Roazhon Park, Rennes
(France) 2019	Round of 16	22 June	Germany	L 0–3	Stade des Alpes, Grenoble
(Australia) / (New Zealand) 2023	Group stage	21 July	Canada	D 0–0	Melbourne Rectangular Stadium, Melbourne
(Australia) / (New Zealand) 2023	Group stage	27 July	Australia	W 3–2	Lang Park, Brisbane
(Australia) / (New Zealand) 2023	Group stage	31 July	Republic of Ireland	D 0–0	Lang Park, Brisbane
(Australia) / (New Zealand) 2023	Round of 16	7 August	England	D 0–0 (4–2(p))	Lang Park, Brisbane

=== Olympic Games ===
(International Olympic Committee) Summer Olympics record
Year	Result	Pld	W	D	L	GF	GA
(United States) 1996	Did not qualify						
(Australia) 2000	Group stage	3	0	0	3	3	9
(Greece) 2004	Quarter-finals	3	1	0	2	3	4
(China) 2008	Group stage	3	0	0	3	1	5
(United Kingdom) 2012	Did not qualify						
(Brazil) 2016	Did not qualify						
(Japan) 2020	Did not qualify						
(France) 2024	Group stage	3	0	0	3	1	5
(United States) 2028	To be determined						
Total	4/8	12	1	0	11	8	23

=== Women's Africa Cup of Nations ===
Women's Africa Cup of Nations record										Qualification record					
Year	Round	Position	Pld	W	D	L	GF	GA	Squad	Pld	W	D	L	GF	GA
1991	Winners	1st	6	6	0	0	20	2		Qualified Directly					
1995	Winners	1st	6	6	0	0	27	2		Qualified Directly					
(Nigeria) 1998	Champions	1st	5	5	0	0	28	0		Qualified as host					
(South Africa) 2000	Champions	1st	5	4	1	0	19	2	Squad	Qualified as title holders					
(Nigeria) 2002	Champions	1st	5	4	0	1	15	2	Squad	Qualified as host					
(South Africa) 2004	Champions	1st	5	4	1	0	18	2		2	2	0	0	12	3
(Nigeria) 2006	Champions	1st	5	5	0	0	18	2		Qualified as host					
(Equatorial Guinea) 2008	Third place	3rd	5	1	3	1	3	3	Squad	2	2	0	0	13	1
(South Africa) 2010	Champions	1st	5	5	0	0	19	4	Squad	2	2	0	0	5	2
(Equatorial Guinea) 2012	Fourth place	4th	5	3	0	2	8	4	Squad	2	2	0	0	6	0
(Namibia) 2014	Champions	1st	5	5	0	0	16	3	Squad	4	4	0	0	18	1
(Cameroon) 2016	Champions	1st	5	4	1	0	13	1	Squad	2	1	1	0	3	1
(Ghana) 2018	Champions	1st	5	2	2	1	10	1	Squad	2	2	0	0	7	0
2020	Cancelled due to the COVID-19 pandemic									Cancelled due to the COVID-19 pandemic					
(Morocco) 2022	Fourth place	4th	6	3	1	2	9	4	Squad	4	3	0	1	5	1
(Morocco) 2024	Champions	1st	6	5	1	0	14	3	Squad	4	4	0	0	13	1
(Morocco) 2026	Quarter-finals	7th	5	2	0	3	10	8	Squad	2	1	1	0	3	1
Total	10 Titles (Note: CAF does not award an official title to the winner in 1991 and 1995. The first champion is registered from the 1998 edition onwards. However, it considers the 1991 and 1995 as official tournaments, counting the number of participations from 1991 onwards.)	16/16	84	64	10	10	247	43		26	23	2	1	85	11

=== African Games ===
African Games record
Year	Result	Position	Pld	W	D	L	GF	GA
(Nigeria) 2003	Champions	1st	5	5	0	0	17	1
(Algeria) 2007	Champions	1st	4	3	1	0	14	2
(Mozambique) 2011	did not qualify							
(Republic of the Congo) 2015	Fourth place	4th	5	2	0	3	11	7
(Morocco) 2019	See Nigeria women's national under-20 football team							
(Ghana) 2023	See Nigeria women's national under-20 football team							
(Egypt) 2027	To be determined							
Total	2 Titles	3/5	14	10	1	3	42	10

- 2019 and 2023 editions of the football tournament was played by the U-20 team.

See Nigeria women's national under-20 football team

=== WAFU Women's Cup ===
WAFU Zone B Women's Cup
Year	Result	Position	Pld	W	D	L	GF	GA
(Ivory Coast) 2018	3rd	3rd	5	4	1	0	10	3
(Ivory Coast) 2019	Winner	1st	5	3	2	0	23	2
Total	1 Title	2/2	10	7	3	0	33	5

=== Minor tournaments ===
Tournaments record
Year	Result	Pld	W	D	L	GF	GA	GD
(China) 2019 Four Nations Tournament	Third place	2	1	0	1	4	4	0
2019 Cyprus Women's Cup	Seventh place	4	2	0	2	8	8	0
(Turkey) 2021 Turkish Women's Cup	Champions	3	3	0	0	11	0	+11
(Mexico) 2023 Women's Revelations Cup	Third place	3	1	0	2	1	2	−1

== See also ==
- Sport in Nigeria
  - Football in Nigeria
    - Women's football in Nigeria
- Nigeria women's national under-20 football team
- Nigeria women's national under-17 football team
- NWFL Premiership
- Nigeria men's national football team
