= Sikiratu Isa =

Nigerian footballer (born 1997)

Sikiratu Isah
Personal information
- Full name: Sikiratu Isah
- Date of birth: 10 July 1997 (age 29)
- Place of birth: Benin City Nigeria
- Position: Defender

Team information
- Current team: Bnot Netanya
- Number: 6

International career^{‡}
Years	Team	Apps	(Gls)
2024–	Nigeria	10	(0)
- ‡ National team caps and goals as of 5 September 2026

Sikiratu Isah OON (born 10 July 1997) is a professional footballer who plays as a Defender for Bnot Netanya She also plays for the Nigeria women's national team.

She was part of the Nigerian women national team squad that won the 2025 Women's Africa Cup of Nations and was awarded the national honour Officer of the Order of the Niger, a hundred thousand dollars and a three-bedroom apartment at the renewed hope estate in Abuja.

== Honours ==
Nigeria

- Africa Women Cup of Nations: 2024 winner

Orders

- Officer of the Order of the Niger
