= Taiwo Tewogbola Afolabi =

Nigerian football player

Taiwo Afolabi
Personal information
- Full name: Taiwo Afolabi
- Date of birth: March 2, 2007 (age 19)
- Place of birth: Nigeria
- Position: Midfielder

Team information
- Current team: Delta Queens

Senior career*
Years	Team	Apps	(Gls)
- Delta Queens

International career
- Nigeria U17
- * Club domestic league appearances and goals

Taiwo Tewogbola Afolabi is a Nigerian football player who plays as a midfielder for Delta Queens and has also played for Nigeria at youth level as the captain of the Flamingos (U-17) and for the Super Falcons.

== Early Life and background ==
Taiwo Tewogbola Afolabi was born on 2 March 2007. Her liking of football started at an early age and progressed through youth football development system before moving into professional Women's football.

== Club career ==
Afolabi plays as a midfielder for the Delta Queens in the Nigerian Women football league. She has played in league competitions for Delta Queens and has continued to play as a midfielder within the Nigeria Women's football.

== International career ==
Taiwo represented Nigeria at youth international level, she played for the Nigeria Women's under-17 national team in international competitions and qualifications matches. She was among the players in the Nigerian youth teams that played in the FIFA under-17 women's world competitions and qualifiers where she became well known for her performance as a midfielder.

In 2024, She was mentioned in Sports 247, which described her growth in the national youth team as a "remarkable journey" during their coverage of Nigeria's preparation for the FIFA under-20 women world cup qualifiers. In May 2026, reports from Nigerian football media linked Afolabi with the Super Falcons setup as Nigeria intensified preparations for the 2026 Women's Africa Cup of Nations (WAFCON).
