= Christy Ucheibe =

Nigerian footballer

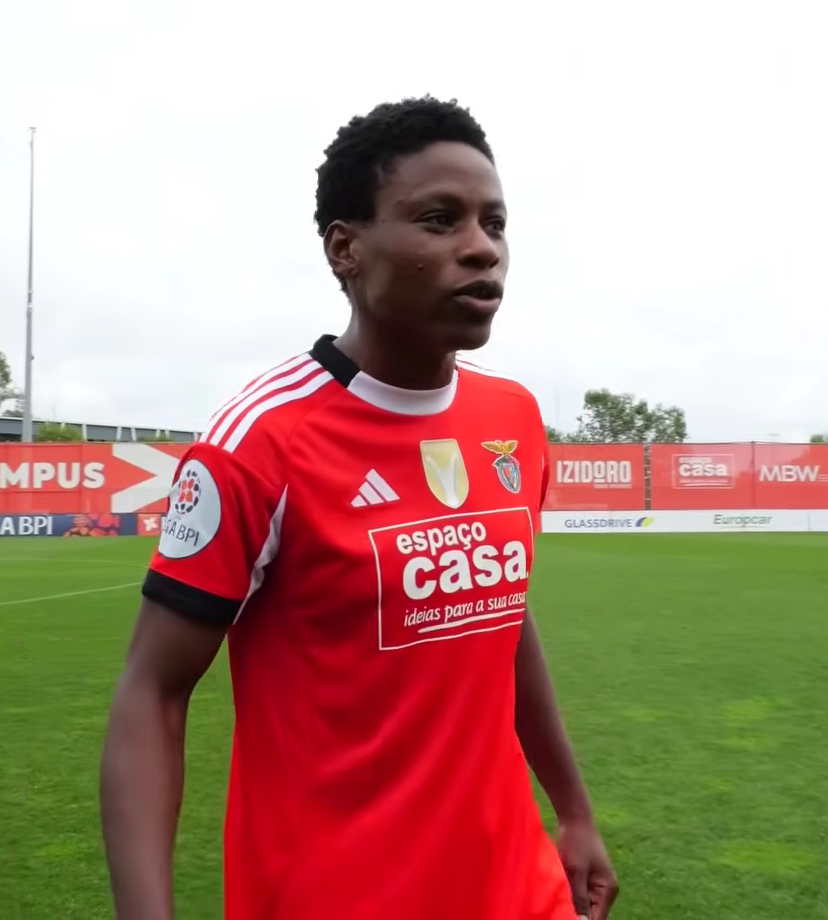
- Ucheibe with Benfica in 2025

Personal information
- Full name: Christy Onyenaturuchi Ucheibe
- Date of birth: 25 December 2000 (age 25)
- Place of birth: Kano, Nigeria
- Height: 1.73 m (5 ft 8 in)
- Positions: Defensive midfielder; defender

Team information
- Current team: Benfica
- Number: 16

Senior career*
Years	Team	Apps	(Gls)
2018–2019	Nasarawa Amazons		
2019–2020	Assi IF	24	(1)
2020–	Benfica	91	(6)

International career^{‡}
2016–2018	Nigeria U17	2	(0)
2018	Nigeria U20	3	(0)
2022–	Nigeria	32	(3)
- * Club domestic league appearances and goals as of 16 August 2026 ‡ National team caps and goals as of 13 August 2026

Christy Onyenaturuchi Ucheibe OON (born 25 December 2000) is a Nigerian professional footballer who plays as a defensive midfielder or a centre-back for Portuguese club Benfica and the Nigeria national team.

== Club career ==
Ucheibe played for Nasarawa Amazons in the 2018 season.

On 14 February 2020, Ucheibe signed for Portuguese club Benfica on a 3 1/2-year deal.

== International career ==
Ucheibe was selected for the 2014 FIFA U-17 Women's World Cup and the 2018 FIFA U-20 Women's World Cup. In the last tournament she played three matches from the start.

Ucheibe was called up to the Nigeria squad for the 2022 Women's Africa Cup of Nations.

On 16 June 2023, she was included in the 23-player Nigerian squad for the FIFA Women's World Cup 2023.

Ucheibe was called up to the Nigeria squad for the 2024 Summer Olympics.

== International goals ==
No.	Date	Venue	Opponent	Score	Result	Competition
1.	7 July 2022	Stade Moulay Hassan, Rabat, Morocco	Botswana	2–0	2–0	2022 Women's Africa Cup of Nations
2.	5 August 2026	Rabat Olympic Stadium, Rabat, Morocco	Egypt	4–1	6–2	2026 Women's Africa Cup of Nations
3.	13 August 2026	Moulay Rachid Stadium, Casablanca, Morocco	South Africa	1–2	1–2	2026 Women's Africa Cup of Nations
4.	13 October 2026	Remo Stars Stadium, Ikenne, Nigeria	Comoros	5–0	5–0	2028 CAF Women's Olympic qualifying tournament

== Honours ==
Benfica

- Campeonato Nacional Feminino: 2020–21, 2021–22, 2022–23, 2023–24, 2024–25, 2025–26
- Taça de Portugal: 2023–24, 2025–26
- Taça da Liga: 2019–20, 2020–21, 2022–23, 2023–24, 2024–25
- Supertaça de Portugal: 2022, 2023

Nigeria

- Women's Africa Cup of Nations: 2024

Individual

- EaglesTracker Defender of the Season: 2023-24

Orders

- Officer of the Order of the Niger
