= Esther Okoronkwo =

Nigerian footballer (born 1997)

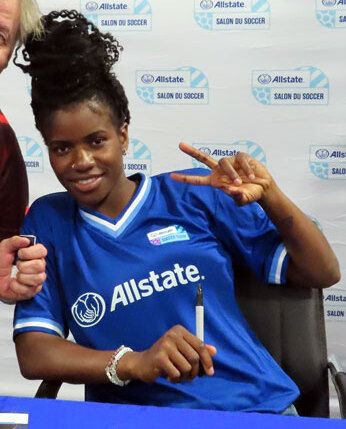
- Okoronkwo in 2026

Personal information
- Full name: Ijeoma Esther Okoronkwo
- Date of birth: 27 March 1997 (age 29)
- Place of birth: Abia State, Nigeria
- Height: 1.73 m (5 ft 8 in)
- Position: Forward

Team information
- Current team: AFC Toronto
- Number: 23

College career
Years	Team	Apps	(Gls)
2016–2017	Northeast Texas Eagles	33	(28)
2018–2021	Lamar Lady Cardinals	39	(35)

Senior career*
Years	Team	Apps	(Gls)
2021–2023	Saint-Étienne	27	(7)
2023–2024	UD Tenerife	10	(2)
2024–2025	Changchun Dazhong Zhuoyue		
2025–	AFC Toronto	26	(9)

International career^{‡}
2021–	Nigeria	28	(11)
- * Club domestic league appearances and goals as of 28 October 2026 ‡ National team caps and goals as of 16 August 2026

Ijeoma Esther Okoronkwo OON (born 27 March 1997) is a Nigerian professional footballer who plays as a forward for Canadian Northern Super League club AFC Toronto and the Nigeria national team.

== Early life ==
Okoronkwo was born in Abia State and raised in Richmond, Texas, United States.

== College career ==
Okoronkwo has attended the John and Randolph Foster High School. She spent two years at the Northeast Texas Community College, and then moved to Lamar University while she was recovering from a torn ACL.

== Club career ==
In June 2023, Okoronkwo joined Spanish Liga F club UD Tenerife.

In February 2025, Okoronkwo signed with at Northern Super League club AFC Toronto. On 1 May 2025, she scored both goals in a 2–1 victory over Calgary Wild FC, to help the club earn their first win in club history. She was named the NSL assist leader upon the conclusion of the inaugural NSL regular season, having tallied 7 assists that season and was also named to the league's Team of the Season. On November 10, 2025, she scored a hat trick in a 4-1 victory over Montreal Roses FC, in the second leg of the playoff semi-finals, to help her club advance to the championship final. On January 15, 2026, it was announced that she had signed a contract extension to keep her with AFC Toronto through 2027. She scored in the opening game of the 2026 season, a 3-2 win over Vancouver Rise FC on 24 April 2026.

== International career ==
Okoronkwo made her senior debut for Nigeria on 10 June 2021 as a 43rd-minute substitution in a 0–1 friendly loss to Jamaica.

On 23 February 2022, she scored her first goal against Ivory Coast in a 2022 Women's Africa Cup of Nations qualification match in Ivory Coast, after receiving a pass from Michelle Alozie. The goal gave Nigeria a 1-0 away victory over the Ivory Coast and ensured qualification for the 2022 Women's Africa Cup of Nations with a 3-0 aggregate scoreline.

On 16 June 2023, she was included in the 23-player Nigerian squad for the FIFA Women's World Cup 2023.

Okoronkwo was called up to the Nigeria squad for the 2024 Summer Olympics.

At the 2024 Women's Africa Cup of Nations (WAFCON), Okoronkwo emerged as the talisman for the Super Falcons. During the quarter finals, she scored once and created two assists in the 5-0 demolition of Zambia to advance the Falcons to the semi final.

At the final match played on July 26, 2025 versus Morocco (in Rabat, Morocco), Okoronkwo converted a 60th minute penalty kick, set up Folashade Ijamilusi for a goal at 70th minute and threaded a weighted free-kick to Jennifer Echegini, who scored at the 88th minute.

== International goals ==
No.	Date	Venue	Opponent	Score	Result	Competition
1.	23 February 2022	Stade Robert Champroux, Abidjan, Ivory Coast	Ivory Coast	1–0	1–0	2022 Women's Africa Cup of Nations qualification
2.	21 February 2023	Estadio León, León, Mexico	Costa Rica	1–0	1–0	2023 Women's Revelations Cup
3.	7 April 2023	Marden Sports Complex, Alanya, Turkey	Haiti	1–0	2–1	Friendly
4.	30 November 2023	Onikan Stadium, Lagos, Nigeria	Cape Verde	4–0	5–0	2024 Women's Africa Cup of Nations qualification
5.	30 November 2023	Onikan Stadium, Lagos, Nigeria	Cape Verde	5–0	5–0	2024 Women's Africa Cup of Nations qualification
6.	5 December 2023	Estádio Nacional de Cabo Verde, Praia, Cape Verde	Cape Verde	1–1	2–1	2024 Women's Africa Cup of Nations qualification
7.	26 February 2024	Moshood Abiola National Stadium, Abuja, Nigeria	Cameroon	1–0	1–0	2024 CAF Women's Olympic Qualifying Tournament
8.	18 July 2025	Larbi Zaouli Stadium, Casablanca, Morocco	Zambia	2−0	5−0	2024 Women's Africa Cup of Nations
9.	26 July 2025	Olympic Stadium, Rabat, Morocco	Morocco	1−2	3−2	2024 Women's Africa Cup of Nations
10.	24 October 2025	Stade de Kégué, Lomé, Togo	Benin	2–0	2–0	2026 Women's Africa Cup of Nations qualification
11.	22 July 2026	Lenoria sports Complex, Casablanca, Morocco	Tanzania	2–1	2–1	Friendly

== Honours ==
Nigeria

- Women's Africa Cup of Nations: 2024

Orders

- Officer of the Order of the Niger
