= Josephine Bonsu =

Ghanaian footballer (born 1999)

Personal information
- Full name: Josephine Afua Kyerewaa Bonsu
- Date of birth: 20 August 1999 (age 27)
- Place of birth: Berlin, Germany
- Height: 1.65 m (5 ft 5 in)
- Position: Winger

Team information
- Current team: Young Boys
- Number: 47

Youth career
- Alemannia Haselhorst
- 2014–2015: 1. FC Lübars
- 2015–2016: Union Berlin

Senior career*
Years	Team	Apps	(Gls)
2016–2021	Union Berlin		
2021–2022	Türkiyemspor Berlin		
2022–2026	Carl Zeiss Jena	85	(8)
2026–	Young Boys	0	(0)

International career
2025–	Ghana		
- * Club domestic league appearances and goals as of 23 July 2026

Josephine Afua Kyerewaa Bonsu (born 20 August 1999) is a professional footballer who plays as a winger for Swiss Women's Super League club Young Boys and the Ghana women's national football team. Born in Germany to a Ghanaian father and German mother, she represents Ghana at international level.

Bonsu began her career in Germany and played for Union Berlin, Türkiyemspor Berlin and Carl Zeiss Jena. She spent four seasons with Jena, helping the club gain promotion to the Frauen-Bundesliga in 2024 and subsequently playing two seasons in the German top flight. In July 2026, she joined Swiss club Young Boys on a two-year contract.

At international level, Bonsu received her first call-up to the Ghana national team in February 2025. She later represented Ghana at the 2024 Women's Africa Cup of Nations, where the Black Queens finished third.

== Early life ==
Bonsu was born on 20 August 1999 in Berlin, Germany. She began playing football with Alemannia Haselhorst, where she played in boys' teams until under-15 level. She subsequently joined the youth setup of 1. FC Lübars, playing in the B-Juniorinnen Bundesliga during the 2014–15 season. In 2015, she moved to the youth academy of 1. FC Union Berlin, where she spent a season with the under-17 team before progressing to the senior side.

== Club career ==
=== Union Berlin and Türkiyemspor ===
After progressing through Union Berlin's youth system, Bonsu was promoted to the club's senior women's team. She remained with Union until 2021. During the 2018–19 season, she featured in both legs of Union's promotion play-off for the 2. Frauen-Bundesliga.

In 2021, Bonsu left Union after six years with the club and joined Berlin-based Regionalliga Nordost side Türkiyemspor Berlin. She spent one season with Türkiyemspor before joining FC Carl Zeiss Jena in 2022.

=== Carl Zeiss Jena ===
Bonsu joined Carl Zeiss Jena in 2022 and made 19 league appearances during her first season in the 2. Frauen-Bundesliga, scoring once.

During the 2023–24 season, she developed into a regular on the right side of midfield. Despite injury problems early in the campaign, she recorded six goals and six assists as Jena secured promotion to the Frauen-Bundesliga. In Jena's decisive match against TSG Hoffenheim II, Bonsu scored the second goal in stoppage time to seal a 2–0 victory and promotion to the top flight.

Following Jena's promotion, Bonsu extended her stay with the club in May 2024. She subsequently made 22 appearances in each of the 2024–25 and 2025–26 Frauen-Bundesliga seasons, scoring her first top-flight league goal during the latter campaign. Across her four seasons with Jena, she made 85 league appearances, including 41 in the 2. Frauen-Bundesliga and 44 in the Frauen-Bundesliga.

=== Young Boys ===
On 23 July 2026, Swiss Women's Super League club Young Boys announced the signing of Bonsu from Carl Zeiss Jena. She signed a contract with the club until the summer of 2028, marking her first move to a club outside Germany.

== International career ==
Born in Germany to a Ghanaian father and German mother, Bonsu is eligible to represent both Germany and Ghana internationally.

Bonsu received her first call-up to the Ghana national team in February 2025, after being selected by head coach Kim Lars Björkegren for a training camp and friendly against Morocco. She made her senior international debut against Morocco on 21 February 2025, coming on as a substitute in the 69th minute.

Bonsu was subsequently selected for Ghana's squad for the 2024 Women's Africa Cup of Nations, which was held in Morocco in July 2025. She made her tournament debut in Ghana's final group-stage match against Tanzania, starting as Ghana won 4–1 to advance to the knockout stage. She remained involved as Ghana progressed through the knockout stages and eventually finished third, defeating defending champions South Africa on penalties in the third-place play-off.

Later in 2025, Bonsu featured for Ghana during qualification for the 2026 Women's Africa Cup of Nations. She played in both legs of the final qualifying tie against Egypt, which Ghana won 7–0 on aggregate to qualify for the tournament.

Bonsu was named in Ghana's squad for the 2026 Women's Africa Cup of Nations in Morocco. She started Ghana's opening group match against Cape Verde, helping the team to a 2–0 victory and being named player of the match for her performance.

== International goals ==
No.	Date	Venue	Opponent	Score	Result	Competition
1.	13 August 2026	Larbi Zaouli Stadium, Casablanca, Morocco	Ivory Coast	2–1	2–1	2026 Women's Africa Cup of Nations

== Career statistics ==
=== Club ===
As of 17 May 2026

Club	Season	League		Cup		Total	
Club	Season	Apps	Goals	Apps	Goals	Apps	Goals
Carl Zeiss Jena	2022–23	19	1	3	0	22	1
Carl Zeiss Jena	2023–24	22	6	4	0	26	6
Carl Zeiss Jena	2024–25	22	0	2	0	24	0
Carl Zeiss Jena	2025–26	22	1	3	0	25	1
Carl Zeiss Jena	Total	85	8	12	0	97	8
Young Boys	2026–27	0	0	0	0	0	0
Total		85	8	12	0	97	8

== Honours ==
FC Carl Zeiss Jena

- 2. Frauen-Bundesliga promotion: 2023–24

Ghana

- Women's Africa Cup of Nations third place: 2024
