= Justin Madugu =

Nigerian football manager (born 1964)

Personal information
- Full name: Justin Pwanidi Madugu
- Date of birth: 19 January 1964 (age 62)
- Place of birth: Nigeria

Managerial career
- Years: Team
- –2021: Adamawa United
- 2021–2024: Nigeria (women, assistant)
- 2021–2023: Plateau United
- 2024–2026: Nigeria (women)
Medal record
Representing Nigeria
Women's Africa Cup of Nations
First place	2024 Morocco

Justin Pwanidi Madugu (born 19 January 1964) is a Nigerian football manager and official. He was recently the manager of the Nigeria women's team.

== Managerial career ==
Madugu became part of the coaching staff of the Nigeria women's team from 2012 onwards. He also coached the Nigerian national mini-football team at least until 2018.

He later coached Adamawa United and returned to the Nigeria women's national team in November 2021.

He was also listed as coach of Plateau United for the 2022–23 season. He participated with the team in the Confederation Cup and the Champions League.

In June 2023, he was elected Financial Secretary of the Nigerian FA.

In September 2024, Madugu was announced as the interim coach of the Nigeria women's national team. Madugu's appointment later became permanent. In July 2025, Madugu led the team to win the 2024 Women's Africa Cup of Nations (WAFCON), beating hosts Morocco in a 3-2 comeback victory in the final. On 7 August 2025, Madugu was nominated for the Ballon d'Or Women's Team Coach of the Year award.

On 17 August 2026, Madugu was dismissed from his role as the head coach of the Super Falcons, following their quarter-final exit in the 2026 WAFCON. As the tournament acted as a qualifier, it meant that the team had failed to qualify for the Women's World Cup for the first time in their history.

== Honours ==
=== Manager ===
International

- Women's Africa Cup of Nations: 2024
