= Jennifer Echegini =

Nigerian footballer (born 2001)

Personal information
- Full name: Jennifer Onyinyechi Echegini (OON)
- Date of birth: 22 March 2001 (age 25)
- Place of birth: Nijmegen, Netherlands
- Height: 1.70 m (5 ft 7 in)
- Position: Midfielder

Team information
- Current team: Paris Saint-Germain
- Number: 6

Youth career
- SCE Nijmegen
- Charlton Athletic
- Millwall Lionesses
- 2018–2019: Arsenal

College career
Years	Team	Apps	(Gls)
2019–2021	Mississippi State Bulldogs	42	(11)
2022–2023	Florida State Seminoles	44	(27)

Senior career*
Years	Team	Apps	(Gls)
2024	Juventus	14	(10)
2024–	Paris Saint-Germain	37	(10)

International career^{‡}
2022–	Nigeria	33	(3)
- * Club domestic league appearances and goals as of 6 May 2026 ‡ National team caps and goals as of 16 August 2026

Jennifer Onyinyechi Echegini OON (born 22 March 2001) is a Nigerian professional footballer who plays as a midfielder for Première Ligue club Paris Saint-Germain. Born in the Netherlands, she plays for the Nigeria national team.

Echegini played collegiately for the Mississippi State Bulldogs and the Florida State Seminoles. In 2023, she led the Seminoles to the NCAA championship and won the Hermann Trophy as the best player in college soccer. She turned professional with Juventus before moving to Paris Saint-Germain.

== Early life and college career ==
Echegini was born in the Netherlands to Nigerian parents. Her family moved to England when she was 11. She spent her youth career at SCE Nijmegen, Charlton Athletic, Millwall and Arsenal.

=== Mississippi State Bulldogs ===
Echegini was recruited by incoming head coach James Armstrong to play collegiately for the Bulldogs soccer team at Mississippi State University in 2019. She spent three seasons there, scoring 11 goals with 6 assists in 42 games. In 2022, she transferred to Florida State University to play for the Seminoles soccer team under Brian Pensky, who had tried to recruit her previously. In her first season for the defending national champions, she had 11 goals and 6 assists in 21 games and earned second-team All-ACC honors. She had two goals and three assists during the NCAA tournament, including a goal and an assist in their 3–2 loss to North Carolina in the semifinals.

=== Florida State Seminoles ===
In the 2023 season, Echegini led the ACC with 16 goals and had 5 assists in 23 games for the Seminoles. She was the MVP of the ACC tournament, bracing in a 2–1 final victory over Clemson. She recorded three goals and two assists during the NCAA tournament, including one of each in a 5–1 final victory against Stanford, concluding Florida State's undefeated season. She was highly decorated for the season, receiving first-team All-ACC and first-team All-American honors, the ACC Offensive Player of the Year, the Honda Sports Award, and the Hermann Trophy, which is given to the most outstanding college soccer player of the season.

== Club career ==
=== Juventus ===
On 4 January 2024, Echegini signed with Italian club Juventus on a multi-year contract through June 2026. She scored 10 goals from 16 matches before leaving the club in July 2024.

=== Paris Saint-Germain ===
On 10 July 2024, Echegini joined French club Paris Saint-Germain on a three-year contract until June 2027.

== International career ==
Echegini scored her first international goal for Nigeria on 11 April 2023 in a 3–0 win against New Zealand.

On 16 June 2023, Echegini was called up to the Nigeria squad for the 2023 FIFA Women's World Cup. She was a member of the Nigerian Super Falcons squad that reached the round of 16 in the 2023 FIFA Women's World Cup.

Echegini was called up to the Nigeria squad for the 2024 Summer Olympics.

On June 20, 2025, Echegini was included in Nigeria's squad for the 2024 Women's Africa Cup of Nations. At the tournament, she scored the winning goal in the final against Morocco after sweeping home a free kick from Esther Okoronkwo; the goal ultimately helping the Super Falcons win a record-extending 10th title.

== Career statistics ==
=== International ===
As of match played 31 July 2024

Appearances and goals by national team and year
National team	Year	Apps	Goals
Nigeria	2022	4	0
Nigeria	2023	7	1
Nigeria	2024	7	1
Nigeria	2025	8	1
Total		26	3

Scores and results list Nigeria's goal tally first, score column indicates score after each Echegini goal.

List of international goals scored by Jennifer Echegini
No.	Date	Venue	Opponent	Score	Result	Competition
1	11 April 2023	Marden Sports Complex, Alanya, Turkey	New Zealand	2–0	3–0	Friendly
2	31 July 2024	Stade de la Beaujoire, Nantes, France	Japan	1–2	1–3	2024 Summer Olympics
3	26 July 2025	Olympic Stadium, Rabat, Morocco	Morocco	3−2	3−2	2024 Women's Africa Cup of Nations

== Honours ==
Florida State Seminoles

- NCAA Division I women's soccer tournament: 2023

Nigeria

- Women's Africa Cup of Nations: 2024

Individual

- NCAA Division I First-Team All-America: 2023
- Hermann Trophy: 2023
- Atlantic Coast Conference Offensive Player of the Year: 2023

Orders

- Officer of the Order of the Niger
