= Oluwatosin Demehin =

Nigerian footballer (born 2002)

Personal information
- Full name: Oluwatosin Blessing Demehin
- Date of birth: 13 March 2002 (age 24)
- Place of birth: Lagos, Nigeria
- Height: 1.67 m (5 ft 6 in)
- Position: Defender

Senior career*
Years	Team	Apps	(Gls)
–2020	Sunshine Stars		
2021–2022	Rivers Angels		
2022–2024	Reims	15	(0)
2024–2026	Galatasaray	41	(2)

International career^{‡}
2022–	Nigeria	36	(1)
- * Club domestic league appearances and goals as of 17 August 2026 ‡ National team caps and goals as of 17 August 2026

Oluwatosin Blessing Demehin OON (born 13 March 2002) is a Nigerian footballer who plays as a defender for Turkish Super League club Galatasaray and the Nigeria women's national team.

== Club career ==
Demehin played for Rivers Angels from July 2021 to June 2022.

She played for Stade de Reims from October 2022 to June 2024.

On 18 September 2024, Demehin signed a one-year contract with Turkish Super League club Galatasaray on a free transfer. She signed a new one-year contract with Galatasaray on 19 August 2025.

== International career ==
Demehin competed in the FIFA U-20 Women's World Cup.

On 16 June 2023, she was included in the 23-player Nigerian squad for the 2023 FIFA Women's World Cup.

Demehin was called up to the Nigeria squad for the 2024 Summer Olympics.

She played for Nigeria in the 2024 Women’s Africa Cup of Nations.

She scored her first goal for Nigeria in the 2024 Women's Africa Cup of Nations in the match against Zambia which Nigeria won 5-0. She contributed to clean sheets for Nigeria during WAFCON 2024 qualifying matches.

she was part of the Nigerian women national team squad that won the 2025 Women's Africa Cup of Nations and was awarded the national honour Officer of the Order of the Niger , a hundred thousand dollars and a three-bedroom apartments at the renewed hope estate in Abuja

== Honours ==
Nigeria

- Women's Africa Cup of Nations: 2024

Orders

- Officer of the Order of the Niger
