= 2018 Women's Africa Cup of Nations final =

Final match of the 2018 WAFCON

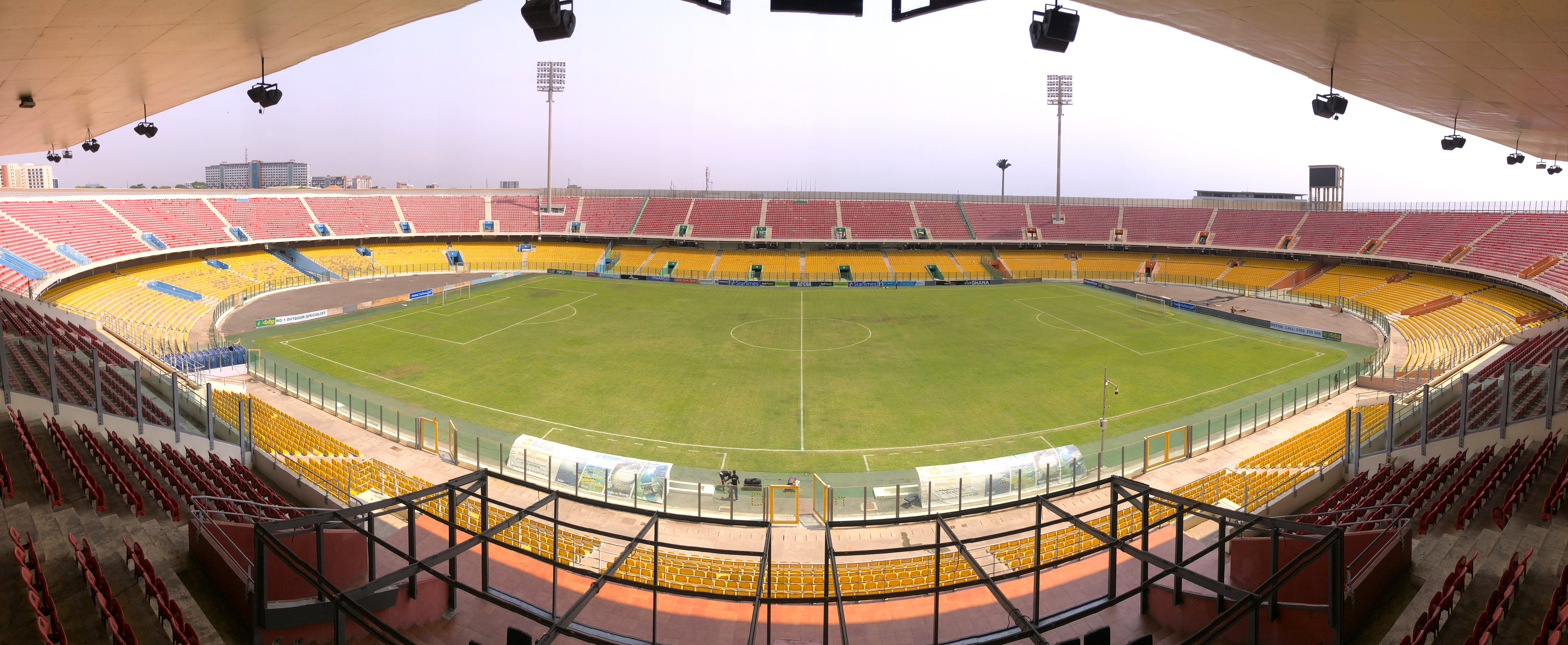
- The venue of the final
- Event: 2018 Women's Africa Cup of Nations
Nigeria	South Africa
(Nigeria)	(South Africa)
0	0
- After extra time Nigeria won 4–3 on penalties
- Date: 1 December 2018
- Venue: Accra Sports Stadium, Accra
- Player of the Match: Francisca Ordega (Nigeria)
- Referee: Gladys Lengwe (Zambia)

The 2018 Women's Africa Cup of Nations final was a football match at the Accra Sports Stadium in Accra, Ghana which determined the winner of the 2018 Women's Africa Cup of Nations. The final was contested between Nigeria and South Africa.

This was the second time in the tournament that Nigeria and South Africa had met in a final, with Nigeria having won 2–0 in 2000.

Following a 0–0 draw after extra time, Nigeria won 4–3 in a penalty shoot-out for their third consecutive and a record-extending 9th overall Africa Women Cup of Nations title. The 2018 final was the first Women's African Cup of Nations final to be decided on penalties.

== Background ==
Nigeria had previously won the competition a record eight times (in 1998, 2000, 2002, 2004, 2006, 2010, 2014, 2016) and were the two-time defending champions. Nigeria had played in eight finals and won all.

The match also marked South Africa's fourth appearance in a Women's Afcon Cup final, having finished as runners-up in all previous three.

Prior to the final, the two sides had met in the group stage of the 2018 Women's Africa Cup of Nations. Their encounter ended in a 1–0 win for South Africa.

== Route to the final ==
Nigeria and South Africa were both part of Group B in the group stage. The first game was against each other, South Africa were able to defeat the Nigerians 1–0 through a late Thembi Kgatlana goal in the 85th minute. South Africa finished as group leaders and faced second-placers Mali in the semifinal while Nigeria had to play against Cameroon, the Group A leaders.

In the first semi-final at Accra Sports Stadium in Accra, Nigeria faced Cameroon in a tightly contested match that ended 0–0 after 120 minutes. Nigeria advanced to the final with a 4–2 victory in the penalty shootout, where goalkeeper Tochukwu Oluehi saved two penalties to secured a berth at the 2019 FIFA Women's World Cup. South Africa won over Mali in the other semifinal at Cape Coast Sports Stadium in Cape Coast. South Africa secured a 2–0 win, with Kgatlana opening the scoring in the 31st minute after capitalizing on a defensive error. A late goal in the 80th minute from Lebohang Ramalepe then sealed the victory.

Nigeria
Round
South Africa
Opponent
Result
Group stage
Opponent
Result
South Africa
0–1
Match 1
Nigeria
1–0
Zambia
4–0
Match 2
Equatorial Guinea
7–1
Equatorial Guinea
6–0
Match 3
Zambia
1–1
Group B Runner-ups

Team	Pld	W	D	L	GF	GA	GD	Pts
South Africa	3	2	1	0	9	2	+7	7
Nigeria	3	2	0	1	10	1	+9	6
Zambia	3	1	1	1	6	5	+1	4
Equatorial Guinea	3	0	0	3	1	18	−17	0

Source: CAF
Final standings
Group B Winners

Team	Pld	W	D	L	GF	GA	GD	Pts
South Africa	3	2	1	0	9	2	+7	7
Nigeria	3	2	0	1	10	1	+9	6
Zambia	3	1	1	1	6	5	+1	4
Equatorial Guinea	3	0	0	3	1	18	−17	0

Source: CAF
Opponent
Result
Knockout stage
Opponent
Result
Cameroon
0–0 (a.e.t.)
(4–2 p)
Semi-finals
Mali
2–0

== Match ==
In the second half, Nigeria had a chance to score when they were awarded a penalty after Goalkeeper Kaylin Swart fouled Francisca Ordega in the penalty box at the 76th minute, but Asisat Oshoala failed to convert, putting the penalty wide.

=== Details ===
1 December 2018
16:00

Nigeria	0–0 (a.e.t.)	South Africa
	Report
Penalties
Ebi (penalty missed); Ebere (penalty scored); Chikwelu (penalty scored); Ihezuo (penalty scored); Uchendu (penalty scored)	4–3	(penalty scored) Matlou; (penalty missed) Ramalepe; (penalty scored) Nyandeni; (penalty scored) Makhabane; (penalty missed) Motlhalo

Accra Sports Stadium, Accra
Referee: Gladys Lengwe (Zambia)

Nigeria	South Africa

GK	1	Tochukwu Oluehi
DF	6	Josephine Chukwunonye
CB	5	Onome Ebi
CB	3	Osinachi Ohale
LB	4	Ngozi Ebere	(yellow card) 29'
MF	18	Halimatu Ayinde
AM	10	Rita Chikwelu (c)	(yellow card) 117'
CM	13	Ngozi Okobi
FW	17	Francisca Ordega	(yellow card) 92'	(substituted off) 112'
CF	8	Asisat Oshoala
FW	15	Rasheedat Ajibade		(substituted off) 62'
Substitutes:
FW	19	Chinwendu Ihezuo		(substituted on) 62'
FW	11	Chinaza Uchendu		(substituted on) 112'
GK	16	Chiamaka Nnadozie
GK	21	Christy Ohiaeriaku
DF	2	Glory Ogbonna
MF	12	Amarachi Okoronkwo
FW	9	Desire Oparanozie
Manager:
(Sweden) Thomas Dennerby

GK	20	Kaylin Swart	(yellow card) 74'
RB	2	Lebohang Ramalepe	(yellow card) 80'
CB	5	Janine van Wyk (c)
DF	13	Bambanani Mbane
DF	3	Nothando Vilakazi
MF	17	Leandra Smeda		(substituted off) 67'
MF	6	Mamello Makhabane
RW	10	Linda Motlhalo
FW	21	Busisiwe Ndimeni		(substituted off) 73'
FW	12	Jermaine Seoposenwe
FW	9	Thembi Kgatlana
Substitutes:
DF	4	Noko Matlou		(substituted on) 67'
MF	18	Mpumi Nyandeni		(substituted on) 73'
GK	16	Andile Dlamini
GK	1	Roxanne Barker
DF	2	Caitlin Cooper
DF	7	Koketso Tlailane
MF	8	Kgalebane Mohlakoana
Manager:
(South Africa) Desiree Ellis

=== Statistics ===
Statistic	Nigeria	South Africa
Goals scored	0	0
Total shots	18	10
Shots on target	3	6
Ball possession	52%	48%
Corner kicks	5	9
Fouls committed	18	8
Offsides	4	1
Yellow cards	3	2
Red cards	0	0

== Aftermath ==
Nigeria won their record-extending ninth Women's Africa Cup of Nations title after suffering a surprise 1-0 group-stage defeat to South Africa earlier in the tournament. Nigeria's win also marks the second time a national team won the continental title three times consecutively, a feat last done Nigeria themselves, who emerged champions five consecutive times in the 1998, 2000, 2002, 2004 and 2006 editions. It was also the first title won by Nigeria women's team under the tutelage of Swedish manager, Thomas Dennerby.
