= Folashade Ijamilusi =

Nigerian footballer

Personal information
- Full name: Folashade Florence Ijamilusi
- Date of birth: 30 May 2001 (age 25)
- Height: 1.67 m (5 ft 6 in)
- Position: Forward

Team information
- Current team: Liaoning Baiye
- Number: 38

Youth career
- Springsoca Academy

Senior career*
| Years | Team | Apps | (Gls) |
| 2019–2024 | Robo Queens | | |
| 2024–2025 | Edo Queens | | |
| 2025– | Liaoning Baiye | | |

International career^{‡}
| 2016 | Nigeria U17 | | |
| 2018–2019 | Nigeria U20 | | |
| 2019– | Nigeria | 16 | (5) |
Medal record
Women's Football
Representing Nigeria
Women's Africa Cup of Nations
| Winner | 2024 |
- * Club domestic league appearances and goals ‡ National team caps and goals as of 16 August 2026

Folashade Florence Ijamilusi OON (born 30 May 2001) is a Nigerian professional footballer who plays as a forward for Chinese club Liaoning Baiye and the Nigeria Women's National Team. She scored Nigeria's equaliser in the 2024 Women's Africa Cup of Nations final against Morocco, which Nigeria won.

== Career ==
Folashade Ijamilusi started playing football aged 6, before eventually joining Springsoca Academy. From there, she joined Nigeria Women's Football League (NWFL) club, Robo Queens, winning the Young Player of the Season award in 2019. She finished as the Top Scorer in the 2023-24 NWFL season.

On 5 February 2025, Ijamilusi joined Chinese Women's Super League side, Liaoning Baiye. On 9 March 2025, she made her debut, grabbing an assist in a 3-0 win over defending champions, Wuhan Jianghan.

== International career ==
Ijamilusi played for Nigeria's youth teams at U17 and U20 level, between 2016 and 2019, featuring at the 2016 FIFA U-17 Women's World Cup and the 2019 All Africa Games Women's tournament which Nigeria won.

In 2019, she got her first call-up to the senior national, as coach Thomas Dennerby called up 30 home-based players in preparation for the 2019 FIFA Women's World Cup. She didn't make the final squad for the tournament.

On 30 October 2024, she made her national team debut, scoring a hat-trick against Algeria in a friendly.

She was called up to the Nigerian squad for the 2024 Women's Africa Cup of Nations tournament. On 18 July 2025, she scored her first-ever goal at the tournament against Zambia, in the quarter final.

On 26 July 2025, Ijamilusi scored Nigeria's equaliser against hosts Morocco in the final, as they overcame a 2-goal deficit to win their record-extending 10th title.

On 10 July 2026, she was named in Nigeria's squad for the 2026 Women's Africa Cup of Nations.

== International goals ==
| No. | Date | Venue | Opponent | Score | Result | Competition |
|---|---|---|---|---|---|---|
| 1. | 29 October 2024 | Onikan Stadium, Lagos, Nigeria | Algeria | 1–0 | 4–1 | Friendly |
| 2. | 29 October 2024 | Onikan Stadium, Lagos, Nigeria | Algeria | 2–0 | 4–1 | Friendly |
| 3. | 29 October 2024 | Onikan Stadium, Lagos, Nigeria | Algeria | 4–1 | 4–1 | Friendly |
| 4. | 18 July 2025 | Larbi Zaouli Stadium, Casablanca, Morocco | Zambia | 5–0 | 5–0 | 2024 Women's Africa Cup of Nations |
| 5. | 26 July 2025 | Olympic Stadium, Rabat, Morocco | Morocco | 2–2 | 3–2 | 2024 Women's Africa Cup of Nations |

== Honours ==
Edo Queens

- WAFU B: 2024

Nigeria

- Women's Africa Cup of Nations: 2024
- African Games: 2019

Individual

- Nigeria Women Premier League Young Player of the Season: 2019
- Nigeria Women Premier League Top scorer: 2024

Orders

- Officer of the Order of the Niger
