= 2024 Women's Africa Cup of Nations =

13th edition of the WAFCON

كأس الأمم الإفريقية للسيدات 2024; Coupe d'Afrique des nations féminine 2024
- Official logo

Tournament details
- Host country: Morocco
- Dates: 5–26 July 2025
- Teams: 12
- Venues: 6 (in 5 host cities)

Final positions
- Champions: Nigeria (10th title)
- Runners-up: Morocco
- Third place: Ghana
- Fourth place: South Africa

Tournament statistics
- Matches played: 26
- Goals scored: 66 (2.54 per match)
- Top scorer(s): (Morocco) Ghizlane Chebbak (5 goals)
- Best player: (Nigeria) Rasheedat Ajibade
- Best goalkeeper: (Nigeria) Chiamaka Nnadozie
- Fair play award: South Africa

The 2024 Women's Africa Cup of Nations (Arabic: كأس الأمم الإفريقية للسيدات 2024), officially known as the 2024 TotalEnergies Women's Africa Cup of Nations for sponsorship purposes and as WAFCON 2024 for short, was the 13th edition (15th if editions of the tournament without hosts are included) of the biennial African women's football tournament organised by the Confederation of African Football. This was the second consecutive time for Morocco hosting the tournament, having also hosted the previous edition two years before. The tournament was delayed and took place between 5 and 26 July 2025.

South Africa were the defending champions but were eliminated by record champions Nigeria in the semi-finals. Nigeria went on to beat Morocco 3–2 in the final to win the tournament for the record-extending 10th time.

== Host selection ==
CAF retained Morocco as hosts on 10 August 2022, thus becoming the first country to host back-to-back WAFCON editions. South Africa had stated an interest in hosting.

== Qualification ==
Morocco qualified automatically as hosts, while the remaining spots were determined by the qualification rounds, whose draw was conducted on 6 July 2023 at the Mohammed VI Complex in Rabat, Morocco and commenced in August.

=== Qualified teams ===
The following 12 teams have qualified for this edition of the tournament.

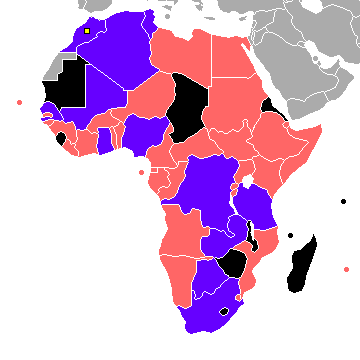
Qualified Did not qualify Did not enter or withdrew Not part of CAF

| Team | Method of qualification | Date of qualification | Finals appearance | Last appearance | Previous best performance | WR (Note: Teams's FIFA Women's World Ranking at the start of the event, according to the ranking released on 12 June 2025.) |
|---|---|---|---|---|---|---|
| Morocco | Hosts | 10 August 2022 | 4th | 2022 | Runners-up (2022) | 60 |
| South Africa | Second round winners | 4 December 2023 | 13th | 2022 | Champions (2022) | 54 |
| Algeria | Second round winners | 4 December 2023 | 6th | 2018 | Group stage (2004, 2006, 2010, 2014, 2018) | 82 |
| Ghana | Second round winners | 5 December 2023 | 11th | 2018 | Runners-up (1998, 2002, 2006) | 66 |
| Botswana | Second round winners | 5 December 2023 | 2nd | 2022 | Quarter-finals (2022) | 153 |
| DR Congo | Second round winners | 5 December 2023 | 4th | 2012 | Third place (1998) | 109 |
| Tunisia | Second round winners | 5 December 2023 | 3rd | 2022 | Quarter-finals (2022) | 89 |
| Senegal | Second round winners | 5 December 2023 | 3rd | 2022 | Quarter-finals (2022) | 81 |
| Zambia | Second round winners | 5 December 2023 | 4th | 2022 | Third place (2022) | 65 |
| Tanzania | Second round winners | 5 December 2023 | 2nd | 2010 | Group stage (2010) | 137 |
| Mali | Second round winners | 5 December 2023 | 8th | 2018 | Fourth place (2018) | 78 |
| Nigeria | Second round winners | 5 December 2023 | 13th | 2022 | Champions (1998, 2000, 2002, 2004, 2006, 2010, 2014, 2016, 2018) | 36 |

== Venues ==
Rabat, Casablanca, Mohammedia, Oujda and Berkane were the five cities chosen to host the competition.

Location of the host cities of the 2024 WAFCON
1 Rabat
2 Casablanca
3 Mohammedia
4 Berkane
5 Oujda

2024 Women's Africa Cup of Nations venues
| Rabat | Casablanca | |
|---|---|---|
| Rabat Olympic Stadium (Stade Olympique de Rabat) | Larbi Zaouli Stadium (Stade Larbi Zaouli) | Père Jégo Stadium (Stade Père Jégo) |
| Capacity: 21,000 | Capacity: 20,000 | Capacity: 10,000 |
| Mohammedia | Oujda | Berkane |
| El Bachir Stadium (Stade El Bachir) | Honneur Stadium (Stade d’Honneur d’Oujda) | Berkane Stadium (Stade Municipal de Berkane) |
| Capacity: 15,000 | Capacity: 35,000 | Capacity: 12,000 |

== Draw ==
The final draw was held at the Mohammed VI Technical Centre in Salé on 22 November 2024. The 12 qualified teams were seeded into four levels based on their FIFA rankings from August 2024. Host nation Morocco will automatically be assigned position A1, while defending champions South Africa will occupy position C1. Nigeria, the third team in Level 1, will take position B1.

| Seeds | Pot 1 | Pot 2 | Pot 3 |
|---|---|---|---|
| Morocco (60) (hosts); Nigeria (36); South Africa (50) (title holders) | Zambia (62); Ghana (66); Tunisia (78) | Mali (81); Senegal (83); Algeria (84) | DR Congo (102); Tanzania (145); Botswana (153) |

== Match officials ==
A total of 18 referees, 18 assistant referees and 10 VAR referees were appointed for the tournament.

Referees

- (Algeria) Ghada Mehat
- (Burkina Faso) Awa Ilboudo
- (Burundi) Suavis Iratunga
- (Cameroon) Aline Guimbang Etong
- (Egypt) Shahenda El Maghrabi
- (Ivory Coast) Akissi Konan
- (Kenya) Josephine Wanjiku
- (Mauritania) Yacine Samassa
- (Morocco) Bouchra Karboubi
- (Morocco) Sabah Sadir
- (Namibia) Twanyanyukwa Antsino
- (Nigeria) Yemisi Akintoye
- (Rwanda) Aline Umutoni
- (Sierra Leone) Aminata Fullah
- (South Africa) Akhona Makalima
- (Togo) Vincentia Amedome
- (Tunisia) Dorsaf Ganouati
- (Uganda) Shamirah Nabadda

Assistant referees

- (Algeria) Asma Feriel Ouahab
- (Benin) Nafissatou Yekini
- (Burundi) Fides Bangourabona
- (Cameroon) Carine Atezambong Fomo
- (Democratic Republic of the Congo) Mireille Kanjinga
- (Egypt) Yara Atef
- (Guinea) Mahawa Kourouma
- (Liberia) Hannah Moses
- (Mali) Fanta Kone
- (Mauritania) Mariem Chedad
- (Morocco) Fathia Jermoumi
- (Morocco) Ishsane Nouajli
- (Niger) Sakina Hamidou Alfa
- (Rwanda) Alice Umutesi
- (Senegal) Tabara Mbodji
- (Tunisia) Houda Afine
- (Zambia) Diana Chikotesha
- (Zambia) Nancy Kasitu

Video assistant referees

- (Algeria) Lamia Atman
- (Egypt) Hossam Haggag
- (Eswatini) Letticia Viana
- (Gabon) Pierre Atcho
- (Ghana) Daniel Nii Laryea
- (Libya) Abdulrazg Ahmed
- (Mauritania) Babacar Sarr
- (Mauritius) Maria Rivet
- (Rwanda) Salima Mukansanga
- (Sudan) Abdalaziz Yasir Ahmed

== Group stage ==
CAF released the official match schedule for the tournament on 29 May 2025. The top two teams of each group, along with the best two third-placed teams, advanced to the quarter-finals.

=== Tiebreakers ===
Teams were ranked according to points (3 points for a win, 1 point for a draw, 0 points for a loss).

If two teams were tied on points, the following tiebreaking criteria were applied, in the order given, to determine the rankings (Regulations Article 74):

1. Points in head-to-head matches match between the two tied teams;
2. Goal difference in all group matches;
3. Goals scored in all group matches;
4. Drawing of lots.

If more than two teams were tied, the following criteria were applied instead:

1. Points in matches between the tied teams;
2. Goal difference in matches between the tied teams;
3. Goals scored in matches between the tied teams;
4. If after applying all criteria above, two teams were still tied, the above criteria were again applied to matches played between the two teams in question. If this did not resolve the tie, the next three criteria were applied;
5. Goal difference in all group matches;
6. Goals scored in all group matches;
7. Drawing of lots.

=== Group A ===
| Pos | Team | Pld | W | D | L | GF | GA | GD | Pts | Qualification |
|---|---|---|---|---|---|---|---|---|---|---|
| 1 | Morocco (H) | 3 | 2 | 1 | 0 | 7 | 4 | +3 | 7 | Advance to knockout stage |
| 2 | Zambia | 3 | 2 | 1 | 0 | 6 | 4 | +2 | 7 | Advance to knockout stage |
| 3 | Senegal | 3 | 1 | 0 | 2 | 6 | 4 | +2 | 3 | Advance to knockout stage |
| 4 | DR Congo | 3 | 0 | 0 | 3 | 2 | 9 | −7 | 0 | |

Source: CAF
Rules for classification: Group stage tiebreakers
(H) Hosts
5 July 2025
21:00

| Morocco | 2–2 | Zambia |
|---|---|---|
| Jraïdi 12' (pen.); Chebbak 87' | Report | Banda 1'; Kundananji 27' |

Rabat Olympic Stadium, Rabat
Referee: Shamirah Nabadda (Uganda)
6 July 2025
15:00

| Senegal | 4–0 | DR Congo |
|---|---|---|
| Diop 5', 22'; N. Ndiaye 13', 40' | Report |

El Bachir Stadium, Mohammedia
Referee: Shahenda El Maghrabi (Egypt)

9 July 2025
17:00

| Zambia | 3–2 | Senegal |
|---|---|---|
| Banda 12', 73'; Kundananji 51' | Report | N. Ndiaye 5', 80' (pen.) |

El Bachir Stadium, Mohammedia
Referee: Vincentia Amédomé (Togo)
9 July 2025
20:00

| DR Congo | 2–4 | Morocco |
|---|---|---|
| Kanjinga 6'; Mawete 70' | Report | Chebbak 25', 43', 76'; Mrabet 83' (pen.) |

Rabat Olympic Stadium, Rabat
Referee: Antsino Twanyanyukwa (Namibia)

12 July 2025
20:00

| Morocco | 1–0 | Senegal |
|---|---|---|
| Mrabet 45+2' (pen.) | Report |

Rabat Olympic Stadium, Rabat
Referee: Shamirah Nabadda (Uganda)
12 July 2025
20:00

| Zambia | 1–0 | DR Congo |
|---|---|---|
| Kundananji 9' | Report |

El Bachir Stadium, Mohammedia
Referee: Josephine Wanjiku (Kenya)

=== Group B ===
| Pos | Team | Pld | W | D | L | GF | GA | GD | Pts | Qualification |
|---|---|---|---|---|---|---|---|---|---|---|
| 1 | Nigeria | 3 | 2 | 1 | 0 | 4 | 0 | +4 | 7 | Advance to knockout stage |
| 2 | Algeria | 3 | 1 | 2 | 0 | 1 | 0 | +1 | 5 | Advance to knockout stage |
| 3 | Botswana | 3 | 1 | 0 | 2 | 2 | 3 | −1 | 3 | |
| 4 | Tunisia | 3 | 0 | 1 | 2 | 1 | 5 | −4 | 1 | |

Source: CAF
Rules for classification: Group stage tiebreakers
6 July 2025
17:00

| Nigeria | 3–0 | Tunisia |
|---|---|---|
| Oshoala 4'; Babajide 45+1'; Ihezuo 84' | Report |

Larbi Zaouli Stadium, Casablanca
Referee: Suavis Iratunga (Burundi)
6 July 2025
20:00

| Algeria | 1–0 | Botswana |
|---|---|---|
| Karchouni 10' | Report |

Père Jégo Stadium, Casablanca
Referee: Yacine Samassa (Mauritania)

10 July 2025
17:00

| Tunisia | 0–0 | Algeria |
|---|---|---|
| | Report |

Père Jégo Stadium, Casablanca
Referee: Akhona Makalima (South Africa)
10 July 2025
20:00

| Botswana | 0–1 | Nigeria |
|---|---|---|
| | Report | Ihezuo 89' |

Larbi Zaouli Stadium, Casablanca
Referee: Aline Umutoni (Rwanda)

13 July 2025
20:00

| Nigeria | 0–0 | Algeria |
|---|---|---|
| | Report |

Larbi Zaouli Stadium, Casablanca
Referee: Antsino Twanyanyukwa (Namibia)
13 July 2025
20:00

| Tunisia | 1–2 | Botswana |
|---|---|---|
| Khanchouch 12' | Report | Radiakanyo 66'; Ontlametse 90+5' |

Père Jégo Stadium, Casablanca
Referee: Aline Guimbang Etong (Cameroon)

=== Group C ===
| Pos | Team | Pld | W | D | L | GF | GA | GD | Pts | Qualification |
|---|---|---|---|---|---|---|---|---|---|---|
| 1 | South Africa | 3 | 2 | 1 | 0 | 7 | 1 | +6 | 7 | Advance to knockout stage |
| 2 | Ghana | 3 | 1 | 1 | 1 | 5 | 4 | +1 | 4 | Advance to knockout stage |
| 3 | Mali | 3 | 1 | 1 | 1 | 2 | 5 | −3 | 4 | Advance to knockout stage |
| 4 | Tanzania | 3 | 0 | 1 | 2 | 2 | 6 | −4 | 1 | |

Source: CAF
Rules for classification: Group stage tiebreakers
7 July 2025
17:00

| South Africa | 2–0 | Ghana |
|---|---|---|
| Motlhalo 28' (pen.); Seoposenwe 34' | Report |

Honneur Stadium, Oujda
Referee: Bouchra Karboubi (Morocco)
7 July 2025
20:00

| Mali | 1–0 | Tanzania |
|---|---|---|
| S. Traoré 45+1' | Report |

Berkane Stadium, Berkane
Referee: Aline Guimbang Etong (Cameroon)

11 July 2025
17:00

| Ghana | 1–1 | Mali |
|---|---|---|
| Kusi 6' | Report | A. Traoré 52' |

Berkane Stadium, Berkane
Referee: Ghada Mehat (Algeria)
11 July 2025
20:00

| Tanzania | 1–1 | South Africa |
|---|---|---|
| Clement 24' | Report | Mbane 70' |

Honneur Stadium, Oujda
Referee: Natacha Konan (Ivory Coast)

14 July 2025
20:00

| South Africa | 4–0 | Mali |
|---|---|---|
| Ramalepe 5'; Jane 32'; Magaia 61'; Donnelly 79' | Report |

Honneur Stadium, Oujda
Referee: Bouchra Karboubi (Morocco)
14 July 2025
20:00

| Ghana | 4–1 | Tanzania |
|---|---|---|
| Adubea 12'; Kusi 63' (pen.); Badu 87'; Boye-Hlorkah 90' | Report | Athumani 41' |

Berkane Stadium, Berkane
Referee: Dorsaf Ganouati (Tunisia)

=== Ranking of third-placed teams ===
| Pos | Grp | Team | Pld | W | D | L | GF | GA | GD | Pts | Qualification |
|---|---|---|---|---|---|---|---|---|---|---|---|
| 1 | C | Mali | 3 | 1 | 1 | 1 | 2 | 5 | −3 | 4 | Advance to knockout stage |
| 2 | A | Senegal | 3 | 1 | 0 | 2 | 6 | 4 | +2 | 3 | Advance to knockout stage |
| 3 | B | Botswana | 3 | 1 | 0 | 2 | 2 | 3 | −1 | 3 | |

Source: CAF
Rules for classification: 1) Points; 2) Goal difference; 3) Goals scored; 4) Disciplinary points; 5) Drawing of lots.

== Knockout stage ==
=== Bracket ===
Quarter-finals
18 July – Rabat
Morocco | 3
Mali | 1
19 July – Berkane
Algeria | 0 (2)
Ghana (p) | 0 (4)
18 July – Casablanca (LZ)
Nigeria | 5
Zambia | 0
19 July – Oujda
South Africa (p) | 0 (4)
Senegal | 0 (1)

Semi-finals
22 July– Rabat
Morocco (p) | 1 (4)
Ghana | 1 (2)
22 July – Casablanca (LZ)
Nigeria | 2
South Africa | 1

Final
26 July – Rabat
Morocco | 2
Nigeria | 3
Third place match
25 July – Casablanca (LZ)
Ghana (p) | 1 (4)
South Africa | 1 (3)

=== Quarter-finals ===
18 July 2025
18:00

| Nigeria | 5–0 | Zambia |
|---|---|---|
| Ohale 2'; Okoronkwo 33'; Ihezuo 45'; Demehin 68'; Ijamilusi 90+1' | Report |

Larbi Zaouli Stadium, Casablanca
Referee: Bouchra Karboubi (Morocco)

18 July 2025
21:00

| Morocco | 3–1 | Mali |
|---|---|---|
| Jraïdi 7', 79' (pen.); Chapelle 89' | Report | A. Traoré 90+7' (pen.) |

Rabat Olympic Stadium, Rabat
Referee: Akhona Makalima (South Africa)

19 July 2025
18:00

| Algeria | 0–0 (a.e.t.) | Ghana |
|---|---|---|
| | Report |
Penalties
| Dafeur (penalty missed); Guellati (penalty scored); Belloumou (penalty missed); Taleb Muller (penalty scored) | 2–4 | (penalty scored) Bonsu; (penalty scored) Boaduwaa; (penalty scored) Boye-Hlorkah; (penalty scored) Badu |

Berkane Stadium, Berkane
Referee: Aline Umutoni (Rwanda)

19 July 2025
21:00

| South Africa | 0–0 (a.e.t.) | Senegal |
|---|---|---|
| | Report |
Penalties
| Dhlamini (penalty scored); Makhubela (penalty scored); Salgado (penalty scored); Mbane (penalty scored) | 4–1 | (penalty scored) Diop; (penalty missed) N. Ndiaye; (penalty missed) Kandé |

Honneur Stadium, Oujda
Referee: Shahenda El Maghrabi (Egypt)

=== Semi-finals ===
22 July 2025
18:00

| Nigeria | 2–1 | South Africa |
|---|---|---|
| Ajibade 45' (pen.); Alozie 90+4' | Report | Motlhalo 60' (pen.) |

Larbi Zaouli Stadium, Casablanca
Referee: Shamirah Nabadda (Uganda)

22 July 2025
21:00

| Morocco | 1–1 (a.e.t.) | Ghana |
|---|---|---|
| Ouzraoui 55' | Report | Nyamekye 26' |
Penalties
| Aït El Haj (penalty scored); Jraïdi (penalty scored); Chapelle (penalty scored); Lahmari (penalty scored) | 4–2 | (penalty scored) Bonsu; (penalty scored) Kusi; (penalty missed) Badu; (penalty missed) Yeboah |

Rabat Olympic Stadium, Rabat
Referee: Suavis Iratunga (Burundi)

=== Third place play-off ===
25 July 2025
21:00

| Ghana | 1–1 | South Africa |
|---|---|---|
| Dlamini 68' (o.g.) | Report | Mthandi 45' |
Penalties
| Chantelle (penalty missed); Kusi (penalty scored); Bonsu (penalty scored); Cudjoe (penalty scored); Amoh (penalty scored) | 4–3 | (penalty scored) Motlhalo; (penalty scored) Mbane; (penalty missed) Holweni; (penalty missed) Magaia; (penalty scored) Seoposenwe |

Larbi Zaouli Stadium, Casablanca
Referee: Shahenda El Maghrabi (Egypt)

=== Final ===
26 July 2025
21:00

| Morocco | 2–3 | Nigeria |
|---|---|---|
| Chebbak 12'; Mssoudy 24' | Report | Okoronkwo 64' (pen.); Ijamilusi 71'; Echegini 88' |

Rabat Olympic Stadium, Rabat
Referee: Antsino Twanyanyukwa (Namibia)

== Goalscorers ==
There were 66 goals scored in 26 matches, for an average of 2.54 goals per match.

5 goals

- (Morocco) Ghizlane Chebbak

4 goals

- (Senegal) Nguenar Ndiaye

3 goals

- (Morocco) Ibtissam Jraïdi
- (Nigeria) Chinwendu Ihezuo
- (Zambia) Barbra Banda
- (Zambia) Racheal Kundananji

2 goals

- (Ghana) Alice Kusi
- (Mali) Aissata Traoré
- (Morocco) Yasmin Mrabet
- (Nigeria) Folashade Ijamilusi
- (Nigeria) Esther Okoronkwo
- (Senegal) Mama Diop
- (South Africa) Linda Motlhalo

1 goal

- (Algeria) Ghoutia Karchouni
- (Botswana) Gaonyadiwe Ontlametse
- (Botswana) Lesego Radiakanyo
- (Democratic Republic of the Congo) Merveille Kanjinga
- (Democratic Republic of the Congo) Flavine Mawete
- (Ghana) Princella Adubea
- (Ghana) Evelyn Badu
- (Ghana) Chantelle Boye-Hlorkah
- (Ghana) Stella Nyamekye
- (Mali) Saratou Traoré
- (Morocco) Kenza Chapelle
- (Morocco) Sanaâ Mssoudy
- (Morocco) Sakina Ouzraoui
- (Nigeria) Rasheedat Ajibade
- (Nigeria) Michelle Alozie
- (Nigeria) Rinsola Babajide
- (Nigeria) Oluwatosin Demehin
- (Nigeria) Jennifer Echegini
- (Nigeria) Osinachi Ohale
- (Nigeria) Asisat Oshoala
- (South Africa) Ronnel Donnelly
- (South Africa) Refiloe Jane
- (South Africa) Hildah Magaia
- (South Africa) Bambanani Mbane
- (South Africa) Nonhlanhla Mthandi
- (South Africa) Lebohang Ramalepe
- (South Africa) Jermaine Seoposenwe
- (Tanzania) Stumai Athumani
- (Tanzania) Opah Clement
- (Tunisia) Yesmin Khanchouch

1 own goal

- (South Africa) Andile Dlamini (against Ghana)

== Awards ==
The following awards were given at the conclusion of the tournament:

| Award | Winner |
|---|---|
| Best player | (Nigeria) Rasheedat Ajibade |
| Best goalkeeper | (Nigeria) Chiamaka Nnadozie |
| Top scorer | (Morocco) Ghizlane Chebbak |
| Fair Play | South Africa |
| Best coach | (Nigeria) Justine Madugu |

Best XI
| Goalkeeper | Defenders | Midfielders | Forwards |
|---|---|---|---|
| (Nigeria) Chiamaka Nnadozie | (South Africa) Karabo Dhlamini; (Ghana) Portia Boakye; (South Africa) Bambanani Mbane; (Nigeria) Michelle Alozie | (Morocco) Ghizlane Chebbak; (South Africa) Refiloe Jane; (Ghana) Grace Asantewaa | (Nigeria) Esther Okoronkwo; (Morocco) Ibtissam Jraidi; (Nigeria) Rasheedat Ajibade |
