= Antsino Twanyanyukwa =

Namibian football referee

Antsino Twanyanyukwa Ndemugwanitha is a Namibian football referee.

== Early life ==
Twanyanyukwa was born and raised in Oshikuku, Namibia.

== Career ==
Twanyanyukwa was awarded 2021 Debmarine Namibia Referee of the Year. She has refereed the CAF Women's Champions League. In July 2025, she was the referee for the Women's Africa Cup of Nations between Morocco and Nigeria which ended 2-3. She led an all women officiating game in a seamless contest between both teams.

== Personal life ==
Twanyanyukwa was nicknamed "Di Maria" after Argentina international Angel di Maria while she played football.
