= Ethiopia women's national football team results =

This article lists the results and fixtures for the Ethiopia women's national football team

Nicknamed "Lucy" in honor of the famous hominid fossil, the team represents Ethiopia in international women's association football and is controlled by the Ethiopian Football Federation (EFF). It competes under the auspices of the Confederation of African Football (CAF), as well as in regional competitions organized by the CECAFA.

The Ethiopians played the first international match against neighboring Uganda on 22 September 2002, which Lucy went on to win 2–0. The team went on to qualify for its first African championship that year. A year later, at the All-Africa Games, it suffered its largest defeat to date, a 7–0 loss to Nigeria. Its biggest victory came in a friendly against Seychelles, which it won 16–0.

== Record per opponent ==
As of match played on 3 October 2026 against Seychelles
Key

Positive balance (more wins than losses)
Neutral balance (as many wins as losses)
Negative balance (more losses than wins)

The following table shows Ethiopia's all-time official international record per opponent:

Opponent	Pld	W	D	L	GF	GA	GD	%
East Africa (CECAFA)
Burundi	2	0	2	0	2	2	0	.500
Djibouti	3	3	0	0	25	0	+25	1.000
Kenya	5	2	0	3	10	8	+2	.400
Rwanda	2	2	0	0	6	2	+4	1.000
South Sudan	3	3	0	0	18	0	+18	1.000
Tanzania	10	3	3	4	10	15	−5	.450
Uganda	12	6	1	5	17	13	+4	.542
Zanzibar	1	1	0	0	5	0	+5	1.000
Africa (CAF)
Algeria	4	0	1	3	4	8	−4	.125
Cameroon	7	0	4	3	3	8	−5	.286
Chad	2	2	0	0	10	0	+10	1.000
DR Congo	2	1	1	0	3	0	+3	.750
Egypt	2	1	0	1	6	4	+2	.500
Ghana	9	1	2	6	4	15	−11	.222
Ivory Coast	1	0	0	1	0	5	−5	.000
Liberia	2	2	0	0	5	0	+5	1.000
Libya	2	2	0	0	15	0	+15	1.000
Malawi	2	2	0	0	9	0	+9	1.000
Mali	1	0	1	0	2	2	0	.500
Morocco	2	1	0	1	2	2	0	.500
Namibia	1	0	0	1	0	1	−1	.000
Nigeria	7	0	1	6	1	25	−24	.071
Seychelles	2	2	0	0	26	0	+26	1.000
South Africa	4	1	1	2	4	8	−4	.375
Zimbabwe	2	0	1	1	1	5	−4	.250
Total	90	35	18	37	188	123	+65	.489

== Results ==
This section lists the results of the Ethiopia women's national football team in international matches against teams representing other FIFA member associations, including both FIFA-recognized and non-FIFA-recognized matches.

=== 2002 ===
22 September 2002 African Championship Qualifiers	Ethiopia	2–0	Uganda	Addis Ababa
	Addis Feleke 13'; Endgena-Leme Aawasso	Report		Stadium: Addis Ababa Stadium; Referee: Ondo Akono (Cameroon)

13 October 2002 African Championship Qualifiers	Uganda	2–2	Ethiopia	Kampala, Uganda
	Nakimbugwe 20'; Mbekeka 51'	Report	Endgena-Leme Aawasso 54'; Teramage Tesfaye 72'	Referee: Loice Limisi (Kenya)

7 December 2002 African Championship	Nigeria	3–0	Ethiopia	Warri, Nigeria
	Mbachu 15'; Akide 63', 66'	Report		Stadium: Warri Township Stadium; Referee: Chimane Nombauli (Congo)

10 December 2002 African Championship	Ethiopia	2–2	Mali	Warri, Nigeria
	Endgena-Leme Aawasso 61', 70'	Report	Maichata Konaré 20'; Rokiatou Samake 43'	Stadium: Warri Township Stadium; Referee: Mukulu Mbula (DR Congo)

13 December 2002 African Championship	Ghana	3–0	Ethiopia	Oghara, Nigeria
	Sackey 30', 60'; Gyamfuah 75'	Report		Stadium: Oghara Township Stadium; Referee: Chimane Nombauli (Congo)

=== 2003 ===
3 October 2003 All-Africa Games	Ethiopia	0–3	Cameroon	Lagos, Nigeria
		Report	Mekongo 57'; Ngono Mani 72'; Bella 87'

6 October 2003 All-Africa Games	Zimbabwe	4–0	Ethiopia	Lagos, Nigeria
	Mpala ×2; Moyo; Ndlovu

9 October 2003 All-Africa Games	Nigeria U23	7–0	Ethiopia	Lagos, Nigeria
	Julia Ekwerike ×3; Ajuma Ameh ×2; Blessing Igbojionu; Rita Nwadike
Note: The match did not count towards the FIFA rankings.

=== 2004 ===
11 July 2004 African Championship Qualifiers	Malawi	0–4	Ethiopia	Blantyre, Malawi
		Report	Feleke Addis 6', 87'; Birtukan Gebrekirstos 27'; Semira Kemal 83'	Stadium: Chichiri Stadium

25 July 2004 African Championship Qualifiers	Ethiopia	5–0	Malawi	Addis Ababa
	Birtukan Gebrekirstos 24', 32', 53'; Helen Seifu 57'; Feleke Addisu 66'	Report		Stadium: Addis Ababa Stadium

18 September 2004 African Championship	Zimbabwe	1–1	Ethiopia	Pretoria, South Africa
	Moyo 81'		Feleke Addisu 48'	Stadium: Caledonian Stadium

21 September 2004 African Championship	Ghana	2–1	Ethiopia	Pretoria, South Africa
	Amenuku 16'; Asante 90'		Belay Tutu 18'	Stadium: Caledonian Stadium

24 September 2004 African Championship	South Africa	1–2	Ethiopia	Germiston, South Africa
	Phewa 24'		Belay Tutu 7'; Birtukan Gebrekirstos 45'	Stadium: Germiston Stadium

28 September 2004 African Championship	Nigeria	4–0	Ethiopia	Johannesburg, South Africa
	Uwak 3', 43'; Ekpo 20'; Nkwocha 68'			Stadium: Johannesburg Stadium

2 October 2004 African Championship	Ghana	0–0 (a.e.t.) (6–5 p)	Ethiopia	Johannesburg, South Africa
				Stadium: Johannesburg Stadium
	Penalties
	Ankrah (penalty scored); Bayor (penalty scored); Sulemana (penalty scored); Ameneku (penalty scored); Rumanatu (penalty missed); Ofori (penalty scored); Avoe (penalty scored)		(penalty scored) Birtukan Gebrekirstos; (penalty scored) Zaytuna Yasine; (penalty missed) Radwa Ali; (penalty scored) Feleke Addisu; (penalty scored) Belay Tutu; (penalty scored) Semira Kemal; (penalty missed) Helen Seifu; (penalty missed) Endale Bezuhan

=== 2007 ===
18 February 2008 Summer Olympics Qualifiers	Liberia	0–3	Ethiopia	Monrovia, Liberia
				Stadium: Antoinette Tubman Stadium

10 March 2008 Summer Olympics Qualifiers	Ethiopia	2–0	Liberia	Addis Ababa
				Stadium: Addis Ababa Stadium

2 June 2008 Summer Olympics Qualifiers	Ethiopia	1–0	Morocco	Addis Ababa
				Stadium: Addis Ababa Stadium

16 June 2008 Summer Olympics Qualifiers	Morocco	2–1	Ethiopia	El Jadida, Morocco

12 July 2007 All-Africa Games	Ethiopia	0–3	Nigeria	Algiers, Algeria
				Stadium: Omar Hamadi Stadium

15 July 2007 All-Africa Games	Ethiopia	1–3	South Africa	Algiers, Algeria
				Stadium: 20 August 1955 Stadium

29 July 2008 Summer Olympics Qualifiers	Ethiopia	1–3	Ghana	Addis Ababa
				Stadium: Addis Ababa Stadium

=== 2010 ===
7 March 2010 African Championship Qualifiers	Ethiopia	1–3	Tanzania	Addis Ababa
4:00 p.m. EAT	Zaituni Yassin 67' (pen.)	Report	Chaburuma 23'; Shurua 53'; Rashid 88'	Stadium: Addis Ababa Stadium; Referee: Damaris Kimani (Kenya)

20 March 2010 African Championship Qualifiers	Tanzania	1–1	Ethiopia	Dar es Salaam, Tanzania
4:00 p.m. EAT	Rashid 77'	Report	Birtukan Gebrekirstos 73'	Stadium: National Stadium; Referee: Martha Nyekanyeka (Malawi)

=== 2011 ===
15 January 2012 Summer Olympic Qualifiers	DR Congo	0–0	Ethiopia	Kinshasa, DR Congo
		Report		Stadium: Stade des Martyrs

30 January 2012 Summer Olympic Qualifiers	Ethiopia	3–0	DR Congo	Addis Ababa
	Hiruth Gabisso 11'; Rehima Zergaw 26'; Shetaye Asmamew 68'	Report		Stadium: Addis Ababa Stadium

3 April 2012 Summer Olympic Qualifiers	Ethiopia	1–0	Ghana	Addis Ababa
2:00 p.m. EAT	Shitaye Sissay 14'	Report	Enti (red card) 85'; Abdul Rahman (red card) 88'	Stadium: Addis Ababa Stadium

16 April 2012 Summer Olympic Qualifiers	Ghana	2–1	Ethiopia	Accra, Ghana
	Ibrahim; Zikpi	Report	Rehima Zergaw	Stadium: El Wak Stadium

27 August 2012 Summer Olympic Qualifiers	South Africa	3–0	Ethiopia	Soweto, South Africa
4:00 p.m. EAT	Matlou 6' (pen.), 13', 90+2'	Report		Stadium: Orlando Stadium

11 September 2012 Summer Olympic Qualifiers	Ethiopia	1–1	South Africa	Addis Ababa
1:00 p.m. EAT	Tibyin Mesfin 78'	Report	Nyandeni 47'	Stadium: Addis Ababa National Stadium; Attendance: 15,000

=== 2012 ===
14 January 2012 African Championship Qualifiers	Egypt	4–2	Ethiopia	Cairo, Egypt
4:00 p.m. EAT	Engy Attia 9', 62' (pen.); Salma Tarik 67'; Hayam Abdelhafez 84'	Report	Rehima Zergaw 45' (pen.); Shitaye Sisay 90'	Stadium: Egyptian Shooting Club

29 January 2012 African Championship Qualifiers	Ethiopia	4–0	Egypt	Addis Ababa
3:00 p.m. EAT	Rehima Zergaw 36', 53'; Helen Bekele 70'; Birtukan Gebrekirstos 85'	Report		Stadium: Addis Ababa Stadium

27 May 2012 African Championship Qualifiers	Ethiopia	2–1	Tanzania	Addis Ababa
4:00 p.m. EAT	Helen Bekele; Berktawit Aboye	Report	Fatuma Mustapha	Stadium: Addis Ababa Stadium

9 June International friendly	Ethiopia	0–0	Ghana	Addis Ababa
4:00 p.m. EAT		Report		Stadium: Addis Ababa Stadium

16 June 2012 African Championship Qualifiers	Tanzania	0–1	Ethiopia	Dar es Salaam, Tanzania
2:00 p.m. EAT		Report	Bertawit Girma	Stadium: Benjamin Mkapa Stadium

29 September International friendly	Ethiopia	5–0	Kenya	Addis Ababa
4:00 p.m. EAT	Shitaye Sisay 8', 31', 87'; Undefined 22' (o.g.); Rehima Zergaw 65'	Report		Stadium: Addis Ababa Stadium

29 October 2012 African Championship	Ivory Coast	5–0	Ethiopia	Bata, Equatorial Guinea
7:30 p.m. EAT	Nrehy 1', 9', 68'; Gnago 51'; N'Guessan 53'	Report		Stadium: Nkoantoma Stadium; Referee: Kankou Coulibaly (Mali)

1 November 2012 African Championship	Ethiopia	0–3	Nigeria	Bata, Equatorial Guinea
7:30 p.m. EAT		Report	Sunday 26'; Mbachu 64'; Nkwocha 66'	Stadium: Nkoantoma Stadium; Referee: Marximina Bernardo (Angola)

4 November 2012 African Championship	Cameroon	0–0	Ethiopia	Bata, Equatorial Guinea
7:30 p.m. EAT		Report		Stadium: Nkoantoma Stadium; Referee: Aisha Ssemambo (Uganda)

=== 2014 ===
30 March International friendly	Namibia	1–0	Ethiopia	Windhoek, Namibia
5:00 p.m. EAT	Amukoto 2'	Report		Stadium: Sam Nujoma Stadium

6 April International friendly	Ethiopia	0–0	Cameroon	Addis Ababa
3:00 p.m. EAT		Report		Stadium: Addis Ababa Stadium

25 May 2014 African Championship Qualifiers	Ethiopia	0–2	Ghana	Addis Ababa
4:00 p.m. EAT		Report	Cudjoe 43'; Suleman 55'	Stadium: Addis Ababa Stadium; Referee: Lilia Abdeljaoued (Tunisia)

8 June 2014 African Championship Qualifiers	Ghana	3–0	Ethiopia	Tamale, Ghana
6:00 p.m. EAT	Ibrahim 24' (pen.); Cudjoe 27'; Kobblah 83'	Report		Stadium: Tamale Stadium; Referee: Incaf El Harkaoui (Morocco)

=== 2015 ===
21 March 2015 African Games Qualifiers	Ethiopia	1–2	Cameroon	Addis Ababa
4:00 p.m. EAT	Loza Abera 15'	Report	Meffometou 83'; Ngono Mani 88'	Stadium: Addis Ababa Stadium; Referee: Sara Mohamed (Egypt)

11 April 2015 African Games Qualifiers	Cameroon	2–1	Ethiopia	Yaoundé, Cameroon
5:30 p.m. EAT	Onguéné 41'; Ngono Mani 77'	Report	Ngo Ndom 2' (o.g.)	Stadium: Stade Ahmadou Ahidjo; Referee: Kankou Coulibaly (Mali)

=== 2016 ===
6 March 2016 WAFCON Qualifiers	Algeria	1–0	Ethiopia	Algiers, Algeria
6:00 p.m. EAT	Zerrouki 60'	Report		Stadium: Omar Hamadi Stadium; Attendance: 300; Referee: Aïssatou Inter Keita (Guinea)

26 March 2016 WAFCON Qualifiers	Ethiopia	1–1	Algeria	Addis Ababa
	Loza Abera 34'	Report	Zerrouki 85'	Stadium: Yidnekachew Tessema Stadium; Referee: Zomadre Koré (Côte d'Ivoire)

14 September 2016 CECAFA Championship	Rwanda	2–3	Ethiopia	Njeru, Uganda
4:00 p.m. EAT	Mukeshimana 45'; Nibagwire 68'	Report	Loza Abera 3', 64'; Meskerem Kanko 71'	Stadium: FUFA Technical Center

16 September 2016 CECAFA Championship	Tanzania	0–0	Ethiopia	Njeru, Uganda
4:00 p.m. EAT		Report		Stadium: FUFA Technical Center

18 September 2016 CECAFA Championship	Kenya	3–2	Ethiopia	Njeru, Uganda
1:30 p.m. EAT	Okoth 52', 64'; Anyango 73'	Report	Loza Abera 37', 82'	Stadium: FUFA Technical Center

20 September 2016 CECAFA Championship	Ethiopia	4–1	Uganda	Njeru, Uganda
1:30 p.m. EAT	Rehima Zergaw 16', 45', 73'; Loza Abera 78'	Report	Nassuna 5'	Stadium: FUFA Technical Center

=== 2018 ===
4 April 2018 WAFCON Qualifiers	Libya	0–8	Ethiopia	Cairo, Egypt
4:00 p.m. EAT		Report	Rehima Zergaw 5', 21', 62'; Loza Abera 18', 23'; Mirkat Feleke 33'; Bizuayehu Tadesse 44'; Betelhem Kefyalew 48'	Stadium: Petro Sport Stadium; Referee: Theresa Bremansu (Ghana)

10 April 2018 WAFCON Qualifiers	Ethiopia	7–0	Libya	Addis Ababa
4:00 p.m. EAT	Hiwot Dengiso 13'; Loza Abera 27', 51', 82', 87'; Rehima Zergaw 45+1'; Senait Bogale 73'	Report		Stadium: Addis Ababa Stadium; Referee: Salima Mukansanga (Rwanda)

7 June 2018 WAFCON Qualifiers	Algeria	3–1	Ethiopia	Algiers, Algeria
12:00 a.m. EAT	Ramdani 19'; Sidhoum 32'; Sekouane 68'	Report	Erehima Zerga 16'	Stadium: 5 July Stadium; Referee: Isatou Touray (The Gambia)

10 June 2018 WAFCON Qualifiers	Ethiopia	2–3	Algeria	Addis Ababa
4:00 p.m. EAT	Loza Abera 63', 72'	Report	Bouhani 18'; Sekouane 45+2'; Benlazar 53'	Stadium: Addis Ababa Stadium; Referee: Dorsaf Ganouati (Tunisia)

21 July 2018 CECAFA Championship	Ethiopia	1–2	Uganda	Kigali, Rwanda
3:00 p.m. EAT	Birtukan Gebrekirstos 39'	Report	Aluka 68'; Nakayenze 75'	Stadium: Kigali Stadium

23 July 2018 CECAFA Championship	Rwanda	0–3	Ethiopia	Kigali, Rwanda
5:15 p.m. EAT		Report	Loza Abera 32'; Mirkat Feleke 66'; Senaf Wakuma 75'	Stadium: Kigali Stadium

25 July 2018 CECAFA Championship	Kenya	0–1	Ethiopia	Kigali, Rwanda
3:00 p.m. EAT		Report	Loza Abera 30'	Stadium: Kigali Stadium

27 July 2018 CECAFA Championship	Ethiopia	1–4	Tanzania	Kigali, Rwanda
3:00 p.m. EAT	Loza Abera 29'	Report	Shurua 45+1'; Minja 56'; Athumani 60'; Swaleh 90+2'	Stadium: Kigali Stadium

=== 2019 ===
3 April 2020 Summer Olympic Qualifiers	Ethiopia	3–2	Uganda	Addis Ababa
4:00 p.m. EAT	Namukisa 13' (o.g.); Loza Abera 76'; Serkadis Kidane 79'	Report	Tarikuwa Debiso 90' (o.g.); Nassuna 90+2'	Stadium: Addis Ababa Stadium; Referee: Shahenda El Maghrabi (Egypt)

6 April 2020 Summer Olympic Qualifiers	Uganda	0–1	Ethiopia	Kampala, Uganda
4:00 p.m. EAT		Report	Loza Abera 68'	Stadium: Phillip Omondi Stadium; Referee: Aline Umutoni (Rwanda)

17 August International friendly	Kenya	3–2	Ethiopia	Machakos, Kenya
3:00 p.m. EAT	Jereko 7', 73'; Shikangwa 90+2' (pen.)	Report	Birtukan Gebrekirstos 46'; Serkadis Kidane 90'	Stadium: Kenyatta Stadium

26 August 2020 Summer Olympic Qualifiers	Ethiopia	1–1	Cameroon	Bahir Dar
2:00 p.m. EAT	Senait Bogale 82'	Report	Abam 52'	Stadium: Bahir Dar Stadium

3 September 2020 Summer Olympic Qualifiers	Cameroon	0–0	Ethiopia	Yaoundé, Cameroon
5:30 p.m. EAT		Report		Stadium: Ahmadou Ahidjo Stadium; Referee: Anaëlle Omanda (Gabon)

17 November 2019 CECAFA Championship	Ethiopia	0–2	Kenya	Dar es Salaam, Tanzania
2:00 p.m. EAT		Report	Shikangwa 80' (pen.); Musongo 81' (pen.)	Stadium: Chamazi Stadium
Note: The match did not count towards the FIFA rankings.

19 November 2019 CECAFA Championship	Uganda	1–0	Ethiopia	Dar es Salaam, Tanzania
4:30 p.m. EAT	Najjemba 63'	Report		Stadium: Chamazi Stadium
Note: The match did not count towards the FIFA rankings.

21 November 2019 CECAFA Championship	Djibouti	0–8	Ethiopia	Dar es Salaam, Tanzania
2:00 p.m. EAT		Report	Senaf Wakuma 11', 66'; Shitaye Sisay 14'; Rehima Zergaw 64', 65', 88'; Soumeya Abdi 71' (o.g.); Alemnesh Geremew 80'	Stadium: Chamazi Stadium
Note: The match did not count towards the FIFA rankings.

=== 2021 ===
10 April International friendly	Ethiopia	11–0	South Sudan	Addis Ababa
8:00 p.m. EAT	Senaf Wakuma 8'; Loza Abera 9', 18', 67', 69', 80', 86', 90'; Modesto Asienzo 19' (o.g.); Aregash Kalsa 40', 52'	Report		Stadium: Addis Ababa Stadium; Referee: Medab Wondimu (Ethiopia)

13 April International friendly	Ethiopia	3–0	South Sudan	Addis Ababa
10:00 a.m. EAT	Senaf Wakuma 27', 53'; Aregash Kalsa 86'	Report		Stadium: Addis Ababa Stadium; Referee: Asnakech Gebre (Ethiopia)

20 October 2022 WAFCON Qualifiers	Uganda	2–0	Ethiopia	Kampala, Uganda
4:00 p.m. EAT	Nabbosa 3'; Najjemba 75'	Report		Stadium: St. Mary's Stadium; Referee: Josphine Wanjiku (Kenya)

26 October 2022 WAFCON Qualifiers	Ethiopia	2–0 (1–2 p)	Uganda	Addis Ababa
4:00 p.m. EAT	Senaf Wakuma 22'; Loza Abera 32'	Report		Stadium: Abebe Bikila Stadium; Referee: Aline Umutoni (Rwanda)
	Penalties
	Loza Abera (penalty missed); Aregash Kalsa (penalty missed); Emebet Adisu (penalty scored); Hiwot Dengiso (penalty missed); Birtukan Gebrekirstos (penalty missed)		(penalty scored) Nassuna; (penalty missed) Nabirye; (penalty scored) Najjemba; (penalty missed) Komuntale

=== 2022 ===
2 June 2022 CECAFA Championship	Zanzibar	0–5	Ethiopia	Njeru, Uganda
1:00 p.m. EAT		Report	Aregash Kalsa 1'; Loza Abera 27', 57'; Kidist Zeleke 74', 88'	Stadium: FUFA Technical Centre
Note: The match did not count towards the FIFA rankings.

4 June 2022 CECAFA Championship	Ethiopia	2–2	Tanzania	Njeru, Uganda
1:00 p.m. EAT	Loza Abera 9'; Mesay Temesgen 62'	Report	Clement 23'; Lunyamila 78'	Stadium: FUFA Technical Centre

6 June 2022 CECAFA Championship	South Sudan	0–4	Ethiopia	Bugembe, Uganda
4:00 p.m. EAT		Report	Aregash Kalsa 26', 65', 87'; Loza Abera 27' (pen.)	Stadium: Bugembe Stadium

9 June 2022 CECAFA Championship	Uganda	1–0 (a.e.t.)	Ethiopia	Njeru, Uganda
12:00 p.m. EAT	Ikwaput 116'	Report		Stadium: FUFA Technical Centre

11 June 2022 CECAFA Championship	Ethiopia	2–1	Tanzania	Njeru, Uganda
12:00 p.m. EAT	Bizuayehu Tadesse 9'; Turist Lema 27'	Report	Clement 80'	Stadium: FUFA Technical Centre; Referee: Diana Murungi (Uganda)

=== 2023 ===
13 July 2024 Summer Olympic Qualifiers	Ethiopia	6–0	Chad	Addis Ababa
3:30 p.m. EAT	Mesay Temesgen 13'; Aregash Kalsa 24', 63'; Nardos Getenet 26'; Rediet Assresahagn 79'; Nyabuony Yien 82'	Report		Stadium: Abebe Bikila Stadium

16 July 2024 Summer Olympic Qualifiers	Chad	0–4	Ethiopia	Addis Ababa
4:00 p.m. EAT		Report	Loza Abera 11'; Senaf Wakuma 20', 45+1'; Turist Lema 89'	Stadium: Abebe Bikila Stadium

22 September 2024 WAFCON Qualifiers	Burundi	1–1	Ethiopia	Addis Ababa
3:00 p.m. EAT	Kanyamuneza 49'	Report	Rediet Asresahegn 38'	Stadium: Abebe Bikila Stadium

26 September 2024 WAFCON Qualifiers	Ethiopia	1–1 (3–5 p)	Burundi	Addis Ababa
3:30 p.m. EAT	Rediet Asresahegn 19'	Report	Niyonkuru 49'	Stadium: Abebe Bikila Stadium
	Penalties
	Loza Abera (penalty scored); Nyabuony Yien (penalty missed); Aregash Kalsa (penalty scored); Birkie Amare (penalty scored)		(penalty scored) Kanyamuneza; (penalty scored) R. Bukuru; (penalty scored) Nahimana; (penalty scored) Niyonkuru; (penalty scored) Djafari

25 October 2024 Summer Olympic Qualifiers	Ethiopia	1–1	Nigeria	Addis Ababa
3:30 p.m. EAT	Birkie Amare 6'	Report	Ajibade 52'	Stadium: Abebe Bikila Stadium

31 October 2024 Summer Olympic Qualifiers	Nigeria	4–0	Ethiopia	Abuja, Nigeria
6:00 p.m. EAT	Kanu 45+1'; Ajibade 50', 72'; Oshoala 68'	Report		Stadium: Moshood Abiola National Stadium

=== 2025 ===
12 February International friendly	Ethiopia	10–0	Djibouti	Addis Ababa
3:00 p.m. EAT	Hasabe Muso 7'; Senaf Wakuma 11', 21'; Emush Daniel 17', 25'; Etsegenet Bizuneh 29'; Nigist Bekele 41'; Emebet Addisu 57'; Etsegenet Girma 62'; Mahlet Mitiku 77'	Report		Stadium: Abebe Bikila Stadium
Note: The match did not count towards the FIFA rankings.

16 February International friendly	Ethiopia	7–0	Djibouti	Addis Ababa
3:00 p.m. EAT	Senaf Wakuma 2'; Emush Daniel 15', 30'; Mirkat Feleke 57' (pen.); Aregash Kalsa 67'; Undefined 79' (o.g.); Mahlet Mitiku 87'	Report		Stadium: Abebe Bikila Stadium
Note: The match did not count towards the FIFA rankings.

21 February 2026 WAFCON Qualifiers	Uganda	2–0	Ethiopia	Kampala, Uganda
4:00 p.m. EAT	Namuleme 89'; Ikwaput 90+3'	Report		Stadium: Hamz Stadium; Referee: Marie-Joséphine Ngo Biem (Cameroon)

26 February 2026 WAFCON Qualifiers	Ethiopia	2–0 (5–4 p)	Uganda	Addis Ababa
3:00 p.m. EAT	Aregash Kalsa 66'; Etsegenet Girma 90+6'	Report		Stadium: Abebe Bikila Stadium; Referee: Patience Madu (Nigeria)
	Penalties
	Emebet Addisu (penalty scored); Emush Daniel (penalty scored); Etsegenet Girma (penalty scored); Mirkat Feleke (penalty scored); Senaf Wakuma (penalty missed); Birke Amare (penalty scored)		(penalty scored) Namuleme; (penalty scored) Nabirye; (penalty missed) Nabbumba; (penalty scored) Nabulime; (penalty scored) Nantongo; (penalty missed) Kobusobozi

22 October 2026 WAFCON Qualifiers	Tanzania	2–0	Ethiopia	Dar es Salaam, Tanzania
5:00 p.m. EAT	Mnunka 7'; Mnunduka 54'	Report		Stadium: Azam Complex Stadium; Referee: Aminata Fullah (Sierra Leone)

28 October 2026 WAFCON Qualifiers	Ethiopia	0–1	Tanzania	Dire Dawa
3:00 p.m. EAT		Report	Msewa 15'	Stadium: Dire Dawa Stadium; Referee: Agnes Ngoma (Congo)

=== 2026 ===
30 September International friendly	Ethiopia	16–0	Seychelles	Addis Ababa
3:00 p.m. EAT	Mihiret Ayele 22'; Turist Lema 24'; Milen Gayim 27'; Nigist Bekele 30', 43'; Etsegenet Girma 45'; Tarikuwa Debiso 45+2', 67'; Emush Daniel 47', 79'; Aregash Kalsa 60', 77'; Dagmawit Solomon 68'; Bethlehem Mentelo 76', 89'; Mahlet Mitiku 80'	Report		Stadium: Abebe Bikila Stadium; Referee: Emmanuela Akoo (South Sudan)

3 October International friendly	Ethiopia	10–0	Seychelles	Addis Ababa
3:00 p.m. EAT	Ashanta Mari 3' (o.g.); Emush Daniel 6', 15'; Bethlehem Bekele 7'; Dagmawit Solomon 22', 32', 57' (pen.); Bethlehem Mentelo 58'; Turist Lema 68'; Rediet Asresahegn 90'	Report		Stadium: Abebe Bikila Stadium; Referee: Emmanuela Akoo (South Sudan)

7 October 2028 Summer Olympic Qualifiers	Rwanda	0–1	Ethiopia	Kigali, Rwanda
7:00 p.m. EAT		Report	Uzayisenga 45+3' (o.g.)	Stadium: Kigali Pelé Stadium; Referee: Anaëlle Omanda (Gabon)

13 October 2028 Summer Olympic Qualifiers	Ethiopia	v	Rwanda	Dire Dawa
4:00 p.m. EAT				Stadium: Dire Dawa Stadium

== See also ==
- Ethiopia national football team results (2020–present)
