= Rwanda women's national football team results =

This is a list of matches played by the Rwanda women's national football team.

== 2014 ==
February 15 Cup of Nations Qualification	Rwanda	1–0	Kenya	Kigali, Rwanda
	Alice 29'	Report		Stadium: Stade Régional Nyamirambo

March 1 Cup of Nations Qualification	Kenya	2–1	Rwanda	Machakos, Kenya
	Ogol 14'; Aide 40'	Report	Nvirahapashimana 29'	Stadium: Kenyatta Stadium

May 14 Friendly	Rwanda	0–3	Zambia	Kigali, Rwanda
		Report		Stadium: Stade Régional Nyamirambo

May 24 Cup of Nations Qualification	Rwanda	1–4	Nigeria	Kigali, Rwanda
	Mukamana 65'	Report	Oshoala 35', 40'; Sunday 48'; Oparanozie 70' (pen.)	Stadium: Stade Régional Nyamirambo

June 7 Cup of Nations Qualification	Nigeria	8–0	Rwanda	Abuja, Nigeria
	Blessing 10'; Oshoala 19', 81'; Oparanozie 20', 30', 52'; Sunday 41'; Nku 89'	Report		Stadium: Moshood Abiola National Stadium

== 2016 ==
September 12 CECAFA Championship	Tanzania	3-2	Rwanda
	Rashid (?); Abdalla (?)	Report	Anne Marie (?); Anton Anastazia (?)

September 14 CECAFA Championship	Rwanda	2-3	Ethiopia
	Dorothy Mukeshimana (?); Sifa Gloria Nibagwire (?)	Report	Abera (?); Meskerem Kanko (?)

== 2018 ==
July 19 CEFACA Championship	Rwanda	1-0	Tanzania	Kigali, Rwanda
	Kalimba 37'	Report		Stadium: Stade Régional Nyamirambo

July 23 CEFACA Championship	Rwanda	0-3	Ethiopia	Kigali, Rwanda
		Report	Abera 32'; Feleke 66'; Demise 75'	Stadium: Stade Régional Nyamirambo

July 25 CEFACA Championship	Rwanda	2-2	Uganda	Kigali, Rwanda
	Ibangarye 62'; Mukeshimana 72'	Report	Mutuuzo 52'; Alupo 74'	Stadium: Stade Régional Nyamirambo

July 27 CEFACA Championship	Rwanda	0-2	Kenya	Kigali, Rwanda
		Report	Achieng 11' (pen.); Engesha 29'	Stadium: Stade Régional Nyamirambo

== 2021 ==
20 October 2022 AFWCON qualification First round 1st leg	Djibouti	Awarded	Rwanda	Djibouti, Djibouti
		Report		Stadium: El Hadj Hassan Gouled Aptidon Stadium

26 October 2022 AFWCON qualification First round 2nd leg	Rwanda	Awarded	Djibouti	Kigali, Rwanda
		Report		Stadium: Nyamirambo Regional Stadium
Note: Djibouti won on walkover after Rwanda withdrew before the first leg citing lack of preparation due to no local championship being contested since 2018.

== 2022 ==
1 June 2022 CECAFA Women's Championship GS Group A	Uganda	2–0	Rwanda	Njeru, Uganda
16:00	Ikwaput 39', 49'			Stadium: FUFA Technical Centre; Referee: Tsehaynesh Abebe (Ethiopia)

3 June 2022 CECAFA Women's Championship GS Group A	Burundi	2–1	Rwanda	Njeru, Uganda
16:00	Niyonkuru 13', 79' (pen.)		Usanase 37'	Stadium: FUFA Technical Centre; Referee: Misgana Tilahun (Ethiopia)

5 June 2022 CECAFA Women's Championship GS Group A	Rwanda	2–0	Djibouti	Njeru, Uganda
13:00	Uzayisenga 11'; Ibangarye 21'			Stadium: FUFA Technical Centre; Referee: Elizabeth Gisma Louis (South Sudan)

== 2023 ==
12 July 2023 2024 Olympic qualifying	Uganda	3–3	Rwanda	Kigal, Rwanda
	Nyanagahirwa 45'; Nassuna 54'; Ikwaput 84'		Mukhirwa 32'; Nibagwire 66'; Usanase 86'	Stadium: Kigali Pelé Stadium

16 July 2023 2024 Olympic qualifying	Rwanda	0–1 (a.e.t.) (3–4 agg.)	Uganda	Kigali, Rwanda
Note: Uganda won 4–3 on aggregate.

15 September 2023 Friendly	Rwanda	0–1	Burundi	Nyamata, Rwanda
15:00 UTC+2			Uwimana 23'	Stadium: Bugesera stadium

16 September 2023 Friendly	Rwanda	1–1	Burundi	Kigali, Rwanda
19:00 UTC+2	Uwase 28'		Zilfa 55'	Stadium: Kigali Pelé Stadium

20 September 2023 2024 AFWCON qualification First round 1st leg	Rwanda	0–7	Ghana	Kigali, Rwanda
15:00 UTC+2		Report	Boaduwaa 3'; Badu 14', 64'; Adubea 28'; Kusi 51'; Achiaa 76', 81'	Stadium: Kigali Pelé Stadium

26 September 2023 2024 AFWCON qualification First round 2nd leg	Ghana	5–0 (12–0 agg.)	Rwanda	Accra, Ghana
16:00 UTC+0	Alice Kusi 22', 26', 37'; Badu 42'; Nyamekye 90+3'	Report (GFA)		Stadium: Accra Sports Stadium; Referee: Jacqueline Nikiema (Burkina Faso)
Note: Ghana won 12–0 on aggregate.

== 2025 ==
21 February 2025 2026 WACON qualifying	Rwanda	0–1	Egypt	Kigal, Rwanda
		Report	Essam 64'	Stadium: Kigali Pelé Stadium; Referee: Sylvina Garnett (Liberia)

25 February 2025 2026 WACON qualifying	Egypt	2–2 (2–3 agg.)	Rwanda	Ismailia, Egypt
	Tarek 6'; Essam 68'	Report	Zawadi 26', 90+5'	Stadium: Suez Canal Stadium; Referee: Marietou Fall (Senegal)
Note: Egypt won 3–2 on aggregate.
