= 2004 African Women's Championship =

6th edition of WAFCON

Tournament details
- Host country: South Africa
- Dates: 18 September – 3 October
- Teams: 8
- Venues: 3 (in 3 host cities)

Final positions
- Champions: Nigeria (6th title)
- Runners-up: Cameroon
- Third place: Ghana
- Fourth place: Ethiopia

Tournament statistics
- Matches played: 16
- Goals scored: 48 (3 per match)
- Top scorer: (Nigeria) Perpetua Nkwocha (9 goals)

The 2004 African Women's Championship was the 6th edition of the biennial African women's association football tournament organized by the Confederation of African Football held in South Africa, who were elected as hosts on 12 December 2003, between 18 September and 3 October 2004.

Nigeria beat Cameroon 5–0 in the final to win its 6th title.

== Qualification ==
South Africa qualified automatically as hosts, while the remaining seven spots were determined by the qualification rounds which took place from May to July 2004. The defending champions receives no automatic qualification from this edition of the tournament onwards.

=== Format ===
Qualification ties were played on a home-and-away two-legged basis. If scores were tied after the second leg, the away goals rule would be applied and if still level, extra time would be skipped and will use the last-resort tie breaker of a penalty shoot-out.

The seven winners of the qualification round qualified for the group stage.

=== Qualified teams ===
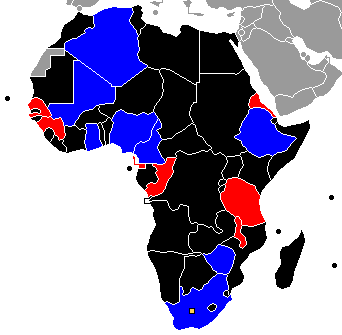
Qualified Did not qualify Did not enter or withdrew Not part of CAF

Algeria made their tournament debut at this edition.

Team	Qualified as	Qualified on	Previous tournament appearances (Note: Bold indicates champions for that year. Italic indicates hosts for that year.)
South Africa	Hosts	12 December 2003	4 (1995, 1998, 2000, 2002)
Algeria	Winners against Mali	23 July 2004	Debut
Ghana	Winners against Guinea	24 July 2004	5 (1991, 1995, 1998, 2000, 2002)
Nigeria	Winners against Senegal	24 July 2004	5 (**1991**, **1995**, **1998**, **2000**, **2002**)
Cameroon	Winners against Congo	25 July 2004	4 (1991, 1998, 2000, 2002)
Ethiopia	Winners against Malawi	25 July 2004	1 (2002)
Zimbabwe	Winners against Tanzania	25 July 2004	2 (2000, 2002)
Mali	Lucky loser (Note: Mali qualified on walkover or as a lucky loser after both DR Congo and Gabon withdrew.)	July–August 2004	1 (2002)

== Format ==
The qualified teams were divided into two groups of four teams each. The top two in each group advanced to the semi-finals. The teams were ranked according to the three points for a win system. (3 for a win, 1 for a draw and none for a loss)

== Group stage ==
=== Tiebreakers ===
If two or more teams in the group stage are tied on points tie-breakers are in order:

1. greater number of points in matches between tied teams
2. superior goal difference in matches between tied teams
3. greater number of goals scored in matches between tied teams
4. superior goal difference in all group matches
5. greater number of goals scored in all group matches
6. fair play criteria based on red and yellow cards received
7. drawing of lots

=== Group A ===
Pos	Team	Pld	W	D	L	GF	GA	GD	Pts	Qualification
1	Ghana	3	3	0	0	7	1	+6	9	Advance to knockout stage
2	Ethiopia	3	1	1	1	4	4	0	4 (Note: Tied on head-to-head points. Overall goal difference: Ethiopia 0, Zimbabwe −1.)	Advance to knockout stage
3	Zimbabwe	3	1	1	1	3	4	−1	4	
4	South Africa (H)	3	0	0	3	2	7	−5	0	

Rules for classification: Group stage tiebreakers
(H) Hosts
Notes:
18 September 2004

South Africa	0–3	Ghana
	Report	Anokyewaa 36'; Foriwa 51'; Asante 89'

Caledonian Stadium, Pretoria
18 September 2004

Zimbabwe	1–1	Ethiopia
Moyo 81'	Report	Addis 48'

Caledonian Stadium, Pretoria

21 September 2004

Ghana	2–1	Ethiopia
Amenuku 16'; Asante 90'	Report	Tutu 18'

Caledonian Stadium, Pretoria
21 September 2004

Zimbabwe	2–1	South Africa
Moyo 30'; Nyaumwe 50'	Report	Modise 4'

Caledonian Stadium, Pretoria

24 September 2004

Ghana	2–0	Zimbabwe
Anokyewaa 18'; Bayor 25'	Report

Caledonian Stadium, Pretoria
24 September 2004

South Africa	1–2	Ethiopia
Phewa 24'	Report	Tutu 7'; Gebrekirstos 45'

Germiston Stadium, Germiston

=== Group B ===
Pos	Team	Pld	W	D	L	GF	GA	GD	Pts	Qualification
1	Nigeria	3	2	1	0	9	2	+7	7	Advance to knockout stage
2	Cameroon	3	1	2	0	7	5	+2	5	Advance to knockout stage
3	Algeria	3	1	0	2	4	7	−3	3	
4	Mali	3	0	1	2	2	8	−6	1	

Rules for classification: Group stage tiebreakers
19 September 2004

Nigeria	4–0	Algeria
Eze 42'; Ameh 50'; Nkwocha 70'; Okolo 75'	Report

Germiston Stadium, Germiston
19 September 2004

Cameroon	2–2	Mali
Mete 18'; Mbida 60'	Report	Diarra 29'; Keita 34'

Germiston Stadium, Germiston

22 September 2004

Algeria	3–0	Mali
Sedhane 10'; Imloul 11'; Laouadi 46'	Report

Germiston Stadium, Germiston
22 September 2004

Nigeria	2–2	Cameroon
Nkwocha 10'; Uwak 69'	Report	Mekongo 61'; Bella 74'

Germiston Stadium, Germiston

25 September 2004

Algeria	1–3	Cameroon
Imloul 11'	Report	Mbida 57', 70'; Mekongo 78'

Germiston Stadium, Germiston
25 September 2004

Nigeria	3–0	Mali
Uwak 7'; Nkwocha 33', 48'	Report

Caledonian Stadium, Pretoria

== Knockout stage ==
At this stage, if a match is level at the end of 90 minutes and additional playing time, extra time, except for the third place match, is played and followed by a penalty shoot-out if necessary.

=== Bracket ===
Semi-finals
28 September - Johannesburg
Ghana	0
Cameroon (a.e.t.)	1
28 September - Johannesburg
Nigeria	4
Ethiopia	0

Final
3 October - Johannesburg
Cameroon	0
Nigeria	5
Third place play-off
1 October - Johannesburg
Ghana (p)	0 (6)
Ethiopia	0 (5)

=== Semi-finals ===
28 September 2004

Ghana	0–1 (a.e.t./s.g.)	Cameroon
	Report	Bella 96'

Johannesburg Stadium, Johannesburg

28 September 2004

Nigeria	4–0	Ethiopia
Uwak 3', 43'; Ekpo 20'; Nkwocha 68'	Report

Johannesburg Stadium, Johannesburg

=== Third place play-off ===
2 October 2004

Ghana	0–0 (a.e.t.)	Ethiopia
	Report
Penalties
Ankrah (penalty scored); Bayor (penalty scored); Sulemana (penalty scored); Ameneku (penalty scored); Rumanatu (penalty missed); Ofori (penalty scored); Avoe (penalty scored)	6–5	(penalty scored) Gebrekirstos; (penalty scored) Yasine; (penalty missed) Ali; (penalty scored) Addis; (penalty scored) Tutu; (penalty scored) Kemal; (penalty missed) Seifu; (penalty missed) Bezuhan

Johannesburg Stadium, Johannesburg

=== Final ===
3 October 2004

Nigeria	5–0	Cameroon
Nkwocha 15', 35', 42', 60'; Okolo 83'	Report

Johannesburg Stadium, Johannesburg

== Awards ==
2004 African Women's Championship winners

Nigeria
6th title

== Statistics ==
=== Team statistics ===
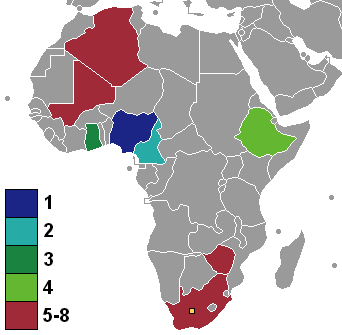
Champion Runner-up Third place Fourth place Group stage

Pos	Team	Pld	W	D	L	GF	GA	GD	Pts
1	Nigeria	5	4	1	0	18	2	+16	13
2	Cameroon	5	2	2	1	8	10	–2	8
3	Ghana	5	3	1	1	7	2	+5	10
4	Ethiopia	5	1	2	2	4	8	–4	5
Eliminated in the group stage
5	Zimbabwe	3	1	1	1	3	4	–1	4
6	Algeria	3	1	0	2	4	7	–3	3
7	Mali	3	0	1	2	2	8	–6	1
8	South Africa	3	0	0	3	2	7	–5	0

=== Goalscorers ===
There were 48 goals scored in 16 matches, for an average of 3 goals per match.

9 goals

- (Nigeria) Perpetua Nkwocha

4 goals

- (Nigeria) Cynthia Uwak

3 goals

- (Cameroon) Séraphine Mbida

2 goals

- (Algeria) Nabila Imloul
- (Cameroon) Françoise Bella
- (Cameroon) Stéphanie Mekongo
- (Ethiopia) Belay Tutu
- (Ghana) Akua Anokyewaa
- (Ghana) Bernice Asante
- (Nigeria) Vera Okolo
- (Zimbabwe) Nomsa Moyo

1 goal

- (Algeria) Naïma Laouadi
- (Algeria) Farida Sedhane
- (Cameroon) Marceline Mete
- (Ethiopia) Feleke Addis
- (Ethiopia) Birtukan Gebrekirstos
- (Ghana) Anita Amenuku
- (Ghana) Adjoa Bayor
- (Ghana) Gloria Foriwa
- (Mali) Fatoumata Diarra
- (Mali) Man Keita
- (Nigeria) Ajuma Ameh
- (Nigeria) Effioanwan Ekpo
- (Nigeria) Felicia Eze
- (South Africa) Portia Modise
- (South Africa) Veronica Phewa
- (Zimbabwe) Marjory Nyaumwe
