= 2016 CECAFA Women's Championship =

Tournament details
- Host country: Uganda
- Dates: 11–20 September 2016
- Teams: 7

Final positions
- Champions: Tanzania
- Runners-up: Kenya
- Third place: Ethiopia
- Fourth place: Uganda

Tournament statistics
- Matches played: 13
- Goals scored: 68 (5.23 per match)
- Top scorer(s): (Kenya) Esse Mbeyu Akida (Uganda) Hasifah Nassuna (6 goals)

The 2016 CECAFA Women's Championship was the second edition of the association football tournament for women's national teams in the East African region. The first edition was hosted in 1986 and won by Zanzibar.

It was held in Jinja, Uganda between 11 and 20 September 2016. There were no sponsors besides the Uganda Football Association.

== Participants ==
The seven participants were announced on 29 August 2016.

-	National teams
Participants	Burundi; Ethiopia; Kenya; Rwanda; Tanzania; Uganda (Hosts); Zanzibar
Non-participants	Djibouti; Eritrea; Sudan; Somalia; South Sudan

Sudan and South Sudan were initially reported as having confirmed participation, but did not appear in the draw. Equally not in the draw were Namibia, Zimbabwe and Malawi, who had requested guest spots.

== Draw ==
The draw was announced on 29 August 2016.

== Group stage ==
=== Group A ===
Pos	Team	Pld	W	D	L	GF	GA	GD	Pts	Qualification
1	Kenya	3	3	0	0	19	0	+19	9	Semi-finals
2	Uganda (H)	3	2	0	1	10	4	+6	6	Semi-finals
3	Burundi	3	1	0	2	10	6	+4	3	
4	Zanzibar	3	0	0	3	1	30	−29	0	

Updated to match(es) played on 13 September 2016. Source: soccerway.com
(H) Hosts
11 September 2016
14:00

Zanzibar	1–10	Burundi
Mwajuma 36' (pen.)	Report	Uwimeza 19', 42', 51'; Misigiyimana 21'; Uwimana 35'; J. Bukuru 39'; Mumezero 44', 66'; Saidi 63', 89'

11 September 2016
16:00

Kenya	4–0	Uganda
Kinuthia 22'; Akida 49', 89'; Corazone 73'	Report

13 September 2016
14:00

Burundi	0–4	Kenya
	Report	Atieno 30', 46'; Kinuthia 33'; Akida 45'

13 September 2016
16:00

Zanzibar	0–9	Uganda
	Report	Nassuna 40' (pen.), 57', 82', 88'; Ikwaput 41', 47'; Nambirige 45+2'; Laki 77', 90+2'

15 September 2016
14:00

Kenya	11–0	Zanzibar
Nafula 12', 39', 69'; Ogol 45', 70' (pen.); Achieng 48'; Akida 72', 82'; Corazone 79', 89', 90+1'	Report

15 September 2016
16:00

Uganda	1–0	Burundi
Ikwaput 45+2'	Report

=== Group B ===
Tanzania and Ethiopia tied for first place after their draw on the last match day. Tanzania were placed first then by the toss of a coin.

Pos	Team	Pld	W	D	L	GF	GA	GD	Pts	Qualification
1	Tanzania	2	1	1	0	3	2	+1	4	Semi-finals
2	Ethiopia	2	1	1	0	3	2	+1	4	Semi-finals
3	Rwanda	2	0	0	2	4	6	−2	0	

Updated to match(es) played on 14 September 2016. Source:
12 September 2016
16:00

Tanzania	3–2	Rwanda
Rashid 5', 74'; Abdalla 30'	Report	Ibangarye 44'; Anastazia 45+1' (o.g.)

14 September 2016
16:00

Rwanda	2–3	Ethiopia
Mukeshimana 45'; Nibagwire 70'	Report	Abera 3', 64'; Kanko 71'

16 September 2016
16:00

Tanzania	0–0	Ethiopia
	Report

== Knockout stage ==
=== Semi-finals ===
18 September 2016

Kenya	3–2	Ethiopia
Atieno 52', 64'; Anyango 73'	Report	Abera 37', 82'

18 September 2016

Tanzania	4–1	Uganda
Donisa 4'; Mwanahamisi 14'; Abdalla 28'; Rashid 46'	Report	Nassuna 89'

=== Third-place playoff ===
20 September 2016

Ethiopia	4–1	Uganda
Zergaw 16', 45', 73'; Abera 78'	Report	Nassuna 5'

=== Final ===
20 September 2016

Kenya	1–2	Tanzania
Akida 48'	report	Mwanahamisi 27'; Abdalla 44'

== Goalscorers ==
Top goal scorers.

6 goals

- (Kenya) Esse Akida
- (Uganda) Hasifah Nassuna

5 goals

- (Ethiopia) Loza Abera

4 goals

- (Kenya) Vivian Corazone
- (Kenya) Neddy Atieno

3 goals

- (Burundi) Djazilla Uwimeza
- (Ethiopia) Rehima Zergaw
- (Kenya) Christine Nafula
- (Tanzania) Asha Rashid
- (Tanzania) Stumai Abdalla
- (Uganda) Fazila Ikwaput

2 goals

- (Burundi) Maggy Mumezero
- (Burundi) Saidi Sakina Bukuru
- (Kenya) Jacky Ogol
- (Kenya) Mary Kinuthia
- (Tanzania) Mwanahamisi Omari
- (Uganda) Otandeka Laki

1 goal

- (Burundi) Aziza Misigiyimana
- (Burundi) Joëlle Bukuru
- (Burundi) Nella Uwimana
- (Ethiopia) Meskerem Kanko
- (Kenya) Carolyne Anyango
- (Kenya) Mercy Achieng
- (Rwanda) Anne Marie
- (Rwanda) Dorothy Mukeshimana
- (Rwanda) Sifa Gloria Nibagwire
- (Tanzania) Donisa Daniel
- (Uganda) Christine Nambirige
- (Zanzibar) Abdullahi Abdallah Mwajuma

Own goal

- (Tanzania) Anton Anastazia (playing against Rwanda)
