= Yudaya Nakayenze =

Ugandan footballer (born 1997)

Personal information
- Full name: Yudaya Nakayenze
- Date of birth: 4 June 1997 (age 29)
- Position: Midfielder

Team information
- Current team: Ergotelis W.F.C.

Youth career
- 2012–2013: C.R.O Club
- 2013–2016: Kawempe Muslim

College career
Years	Team	Apps	(Gls)
2018	Seminole State Trojans	20	(12)
2019–2021	Lindsey Wilson Blue Raiders	32	(20)

Senior career*
Years	Team	Apps	(Gls)
2015–2017	Kawempe Muslim	32	(8)
2017–2018	UCU Lady Cardinals	35	(8)
2023–2024	Kawempe Muslim	?	(4)
2024–2025	REA	17	(0)
2025–	Ergotelis	14	(14)

International career
2018–	Uganda	12	(2)
- * Club domestic league appearances and goals as of 22 June 2026

Yudaya Nakayenze (born 4 June 1997) is a Ugandan professional footballer who plays as a midfielder for Greek club Ergotelis and the Uganda women's national team.

== International career ==
On 21 July 2018, Nakayenze scored a 75th minute winning goal via a header for Uganda as they defeated Ethiopia by 2–1 in the 2018 CECAFA Women's Championship in Rwanda.

Nakayenze featured for the Ugandan national team during the 2016 and 2018 CECAFA Women's championship. She also played in the 2020 Tokyo Olympics Qualifiers against Ethiopia. She also featured for the Ugandan national team during the 2022 Africa Women Cup of Nations in Morocco.

=== International goals ===
Scores and results list Uganda goal tally first

No.	Date	Venue	Opponent	Score	Result	Competition
1	21 July 2018	Kigali Stadium, Kigali, Rwanda	Ethiopia	2–1	2–1	2018 CECAFA Women's Championship

== Honours ==
Kawempe Muslim Ladies FC

- FUFA Women Super League (4): 2014/15, 2015/16, 2016/17, 2023/24

UCU Lady Cardinals

- Uganda Cup (1): 2018

Seminole State College

- Regional Games MVP : 2018
- Conference Games, First Team: 2018
- NAIA Games, All American First Team: 2019

Linsay Wilson College

- NAIA Conference Games, All Conference First Team: 2020
- NAIA Conference Games, All Conference Second Team: 2021
