= Adélaïde Koudougnon =

Ivorian athlete and football player and manager

Personal information
- Full name: Adélaïde Koudougnon Ozoua
- Date of birth: 1977 (age 48–49)
- Positions: Right back; right winger; attacking midfielder

Youth career
- 1987–19??: Carpes Rouges

Senior career*
Years	Team	Apps	(Gls)
19??–199?	Carpes Rouges		
1998–2002	Juventus de Yopougon		

International career
2002	Ivory Coast	1+	(1+)

Managerial career
- 2002: Juventus de Yopougon (player-coach)
- 2004–2010: Ivory Coast Women
Medal record
Women's athletics
Representing Ivory Coast
African Championships
Bronze medal – third place	1996 Yaoundé	Heptathlon
- * Club domestic league appearances and goals

Adélaïde Koudougnon Ozoua (born 1977) is an Ivorian former athlete and a former football player and manager.

As an athlete, Koudougnon has competed in heptathlon, hurdling, long jump and triple jump. As a footballer, she played first as a right back, then as a right winger and finally as an attacking midfielder. She has been a member of the Ivory Coast women's national team as both player and manager.

== Athletics career ==
Koudougnon is a bronze medalist in the triple jump at the 1995 African Junior Championships in Bouaké. She was then a bronze medalist in heptathlon at the 1996 African Championships in Athletics in Yaoundé.

Koudougnon was crowned champion of Ivory Coast in the 100 metres hurdles in 1994, 1995 and 1998, the 200 meters hurdles in 1994, the long jump in 1995 and 1998 and the triple jump in 1994 and 1995.

== Football career ==
=== Club career ===
Koudougnon began her football career in 1987 for Carpes Rouges, a team from San-Pédro. She was a national champion with this side in 1993. Five years later, she moved to Abidjan-based club Juventus de Yopougon, which she has won the league four times and was distinguished as best player in 2000.

=== International career ===
Koudougnon capped for Ivory Coast at senior level during the 2002 African Women's Championship qualification.

==== International goals ====
Scores and results list Ivory Coast's goal tally first

No.	Date	Venue	Opponent	Score	Result	Competition	Ref.
1	10 August 2002	?, Abidjan, Ivory Coast	Mali	2–2	3–3	2002 African Women's Championship qualification	

=== Managerial career ===
In 2002, Koudougnon was player-coach for Juventus de Yopougon and was the best league manager that year. She became the head coach of the Ivory Coast women's national team in 2004. She was replaced by Clémentine Touré in February 2010.
