= Aregash Kalsa =

Ethiopian footballer

Aregash Kalsa Tadesse
Personal information
- Place of birth: Ethiopia
- Positions: Forward; midfielder

Team information
- Current team: Ethiopia Nigd Bank

Senior career*
Years	Team	Apps	(Gls)
2022–2024	Ethiopia Nigd Bank		(39)

International career
2021–2024	Ethiopia	6	(3)
- * Club domestic league appearances and goals

Aregash Kalsa Tadesse (born September 8, 2003) is an Ethiopian footballer who plays as a forward and midfielder for Ethiopia Nigd Bank and the Ethiopia women's national team.

== Club career ==
Kalsa has played for the football club called Ethiopia Nigd Bank in the Ethiopian Women's Premier League.

She has also featured with the club in domestic competitions as well as continental tournament such as the CAF Women's Champions League.

== International career ==
Kalsa has represented the Ethiopia at both the youth and senior level.

At the youth level, she featured for the Ethiopian U20 team during competition such as the African Games-Women 2023 Accra.

She also played for the senior national women's team appearing in international competitions including FIFA friendlies and qualifications matches for major African tournaments. She was included in the teams squad setup for major tournaments like the Women's Africa Cup of Nations (WAFCON).

== International goals ==
No.	Date	Venue	Opponent	Score	Result	Competition
1.	30 September 2026	Abebe Bikila Stadium, Addis Ababa, Ethiopia	Seychelles	9–0	16–0	Friendly
2.	30 September 2026	Abebe Bikila Stadium, Addis Ababa, Ethiopia	Seychelles	13–0	16–0	Friendly

== Career statistics ==
Kalsa has participated in international matches for Ethiopia scoring multiple goals in friendlies and competitive fixtures.

== Playing style ==
Kalsa plays primarily as a forward but can also operate as a midfielder.
