= Laure Koléla =

Congolese footballer (born 1991)

Personal information
- Date of birth: 8 March 1991 (age 35)
- Place of birth: Pointe-Noire, Congo
- Position: Defender

Senior career*
Years	Team	Apps	(Gls)
2009–2010	Évreux FC 27	11	(0)
2012–2013	Compiègne	?	(?)

International career^{‡}
? – ?	Congo	?	(?)
- * Club domestic league appearances and goals as of 17 December 2020 ‡ National team caps and goals as of 17 December 2020

Laure Koléla (born 8 March 1991) is a Congolese women's footballer who plays as a defender.

== Personal life ==
Koléla was born in Pointe-Noire, Republic of the Congo. She is the sister of fellow Congoloese women's footballer Chardente Saya Ndoulou. In 2008, Koléla and Saya Ndoulou fled Congo due to the war there, and claimed asylum in France.

== Career ==
In the 2009/10 season, Koléla made eleven appearances for Évreux FC 27 in Division 2 Féminine. For the 2012/13 season, she signed for Union sportive Compiègne Club Oise. She scored in a 2013 Coupe de France Féminine match against St-Léonard, a match which Compiègne won 9–0.

Koléla has played for Congo women's national football team, and has been co-captain alongside Chardente Ndoulou.
