= Rwanda women's national football team =

Rwanda
- Nickname(s): She-Amavubi (The She-Wasps)
- Association: Rwandese Association Football Federation
- Confederation: CAF (Africa)
- Sub-confederation: CECAFA (East & Central Africa)
- Head coach: (Rwanda) Sosthenes Habimana
- Captain: Gloria Nibagwire
- Top scorer: Alice Niyoyita; Jeanne Nyirahatashima; Clementine Mukamana (1)
- Home stadium: Stade Régional Nyamirambo
- FIFA code: RWA
First colours

FIFA ranking
- Current: 169 (16 June 2026)
- Highest: 105 (December 2017)
- Lowest: 169 (December 2025)

First international
- Rwanda 1–0 Kenya (Kigali, Rwanda; 16 February 2014)

Biggest win
- Rwanda 2–0 Djibouti (Njeru, Uganda; 5 June 2022)

Biggest defeat
- Nigeria 8–0 Rwanda (Kaduna, Nigeria; 7 June 2014)

The Rwanda women's national football team represents Rwanda in women's association football and is controlled by the Rwandese Association Football Federation. It had to date been scheduled to compete in one major tournament, the inaugural Women's Challenge Cup held in Zanzibar in October 2007, but the event was ultimately canceled. It has finally debuted in February 2014 against Kenya. The team is nicknamed The She-Amavubi (Kinyarwanda for The She-Wasps).

As of the latest update on August 16, 2024, the Rwanda National Women's Team is ranked 167th in the world with a total of 874.81 points.

== History ==
=== Background ===
The development of women's football in Africa faces several challenges, including limited access to education, poverty amongst women in the wider society, and fundamental inequality present in that society that occasionally allows for female-specific human rights abuses. At the same time, if talented women footballers do emerge, many choose to go abroad to maximize playing opportunities. A lack of funding impedes regional development of women's football as most of the funding for the women's national team comes from FIFA, not the national football association.

Inside Rwanda, the first women's football programme was developed in 2000. "Kicking for Reconciliation" was created during the late 2000s, and involved over 100 young players in an attempt at "bringing healing to a nation that saw the worst genocide since World War II" through sport. The programme was open to both Tutsis and Hutus. By 2008, this included a schools and university competition. Women's football was supported by a single dedicated national federation staffer by 2006. Women's sport, including football, received little press coverage in the Rwandan media. A women's football league was founded in 2008, and the country is the only one in the region with a viable league, but it still faces challenges related to funding for teams, with most of its funding coming from FIFA. Grace Nyinawumuntu became the first female referee at the senior level in Rwanda in 2004, and went on to become the first woman to coach a professional team in the country in 2009. Her professional women's side went on to win the league championship under her leadership. The lack of high-level football opportunities in Uganda led to some players going from there to Rwanda for opportunities to play in the country's professional league.

International training related to women is limited in Rwanda. Between 1991 and 2010, there was no FIFA FUTURO III regional course for women's coaching, no women's football seminar held in the country, and no FIFA MA course held for women and youth football. Internationally, in 2007, a representative from the country attended a FIFA sponsored women's football symposium in China. Felicite Rwemarika is the head of women's football in the country. She is credited with developing the sport in the country by founding the Association of Kigali Women in Football amongst other things.

=== Canceled 2007 participation ===
The inaugural Council for East and Central Africa Football Associations (CECAFA) Women's Challenge Cup was supposed to be held in Zanzibar in October 2007, an event Rwanda was planning to send a national team to compete in, but the competition was ultimately canceled. The competition was to be funded by Confederation of African Football. The Council of East and Central Africa Football Associations secretary, Nicholas Musonye said of the event, "CAF wants to develop women football in this region in recognition of the milestones CECAFA has achieved over the years. CAF appreciates what CECAFA has done despite the hardships the association has gone through, from financial problems to political instability in member states and poor management of associations. Member states in the CECAFA region have not taken women's football seriously. CAF now wants to sponsor a long-term campaign to attract women from this region into the game."

=== Home stadium ===
The Rwanda women's national football team plays their home matches on the Nyamirambo Regional Stadium.

=== Senior national team ===
While the Rwanda women's national under-20 football team existed and played in matches by 2009 for the 2010 FIFA U-20 Women's World Cup African qualifiers, the senior national team was not competing in matches during the 2010s. There was no senior team competing in the 2010 African Women's Championships during the preliminary rounds or the 2011 All Africa Games. In March 2012, the team was not ranked in the world by FIFA and a senior national team still did not exist. However, a senior national team played its first official match on 16 February 2014.

She-Amavubi debuted on 16 January 2014, in the 2014 African Women's Championship first qualification round, against Kenya in the Stade Régional Nyamirambo in Kigali. They won 1–0 from a goal scored by Alice Niyoyita at the 29th minute in the first leg. In the second leg in Kenyatta Stadium, Machakos, Kenya they lost 2–1 with the solitary goal scored by Jeanne Nyirahatashima. Rwanda qualified for the second round by the away goals rule after finishing 2–2 on aggregate and played against Nigeria. Their third official match was disputed on 13 May 2014 against Zambia and ended in a 3–0 loss, making it the third loss of their record. They disputed the 2014 African Women's Championship second qualification round with Nigeria on 24 May 2014, losing 4–1. The goal was scored by Clementine Mukamana at the 53rd minute. In the second leg, again competing against Nigeria on 7 June 2014, the She-Amavubi lost by a crushing 8–0 defeat, leaving them out of the 2014 African Women's Championship by a 12–1 aggregate score.

Gloria Nibagwire became the first captain of She-Amavubi.

Rwanda competed at the 2016 CECAFA Women's Championship, losing both games by a 3–2 scoreline, to Tanzania and Ethiopia.

The Rwandan federation hosted the 2018 CECAFA Women's Championship. The Nyamirambo Regional Stadium held all 10 of the games in the round robin tournament. Rwanda beat Tanzania (the eventual champions) 1–0 but finished last on 4 points from their 4 games.

Rwanda's women national football – the 'She-Wasps' eliminated Kenya in the first round of the 2014 African Women's Championship (AWC).

== Results and fixtures ==
The following is a list of match results in the last 12 months, as well as any future matches that have been scheduled.

Legend

Win Draw Lose Fixture

== Record per opponent ==
Key

Positive balance (more wins than losses)
Neutral balance (as many wins as losses)
Negative balance (more losses than wins)

The following table shows Rwanda' all-time official international record per opponent:

Opponent	Pld	W	D	L	GF	GA	GD	W%	Confederation
Burundi	1	0	0	1	1	2	−1	00.00	CAF
Djibouti	1	1	0	0	2	0	2	100.00	CAF
Ethiopia	2	0	0	2	2	6	−4	00.00	CAF
Kenya	3	1	0	2	2	4	−2	33.33	CAF
Nigeria	2	0	0	2	1	12	−11	00.00	CAF
Tanzania	2	1	0	1	3	3	0	50.00	CAF
Uganda	2	0	1	1	2	4	−2	00.00	CAF
Zambia	1	0	0	1	0	3	−3	00.00	CAF
Total	14	3	1	10	13	34	-21	21.43	—

== Coaching staff ==
=== Current coaching staff ===
As of 21 May 2022

Position	Name
Head coach	(Rwanda) Sosthenes Habimana
Technical Director	
Assistant coach	Shabani Mbarushimana
Assistant coach	Consolee Mukashema
Goalkeeping Coach	Claude Maniraguha
Physical coach	Jennifer Ujeneza
Physical coach	Solange Niyigena
Team Manager	

=== Manager history ===
Name	Period
(Rwanda) Grace Nyinawumuntu	2014–2017
(Rwanda) Jean Baptiste Kayiranga	2018–2020
(Rwanda) Sosthenes Habimana	2022–present

== Players ==
=== Current squad ===
- This is the Final Squad named in September 2023 For 2024 Women's Africa Cup of Nations qualification.
- Caps and goals accurate up to and including 30 October 2021.

No.	Pos.	Player	Date of birth (age)	Club
	GK	Elisabeth Mutuyimana		(Rwanda Football Federation) APAER WFC
	GK	Angeline Ndakimana		(Rwanda Football Federation) As Kigali
	GK	Diane Uwamahoro		(Rwanda Football Federation) As Kigali
	DF	Djamila Abimana		(Rwanda Football Federation) Kamony
	DF	Joselyne Mukantaganira		(Rwanda Football Federation) Rayon Sport WFC
	DF	Lydia Uzayisenga		(Rwanda Football Federation) APAER WFC
	DF	Safi Uwanyirigira		(Rwanda Football Federation) Rayon Sport WFC
	DF	Louise Maniraguha		(Rwanda Football Federation) AS Kigali
	DF	Androsene Uwase	28 November 1995 (age 30)	(Rwanda Football Federation) Rayon Sport WFC
	DF	Providence Mukahirwe		(Rwanda Football Federation) Fatima WFC
	DF	Gorette Niyonkuru		(Rwanda Football Federation)
	MF	Dorothee Mukeshimana		(Rwanda Football Federation) Rayon Sport WFC
	MF	Diane Nyirandagijimana		(Rwanda Football Federation)
	MF	Dudja Umwari		(Rwanda Football Federation) FAtima WFC
	MF	Leoncie Tugeriwacu		(Rwanda Football Federation) Inyemera WFC
	MF	Emerance Niyonshuti		(Rwanda Football Federation) KomaniWFC
	MF	Gloria Nibagwire (captain)	14 August 1982 (age 44)	(Rwanda Football Federation) AS Kigali
	MF	Alodia Kayitesi	28 November 1996 (age 29)	(Rwanda Football Federation) AS Kigali
	MF	Angelique Umuhoza		(Rwanda Football Federation) Rayon Sport WFC
	MF	Martha Nyiramwiza		(Rwanda Football Federation)
	FW	Folrence Imanizabayo		(Rwanda Football Federation) Rayon Sport WFC
	FW	Zawadi Usanase		(Rwanda Football Federation)
	FW	Delphine Irumya		(Rwanda Football Federation) Fatima WFC
	FW	Liberathe Nibagwire		(Rwanda Football Federation)
	FW	Evelyne Ishimwe		(Rwanda Football Federation)

=== Recent call-ups ===
The following players have been called up to a Rwanda squad in the past 12 months.

Pos.	Player	Date of birth (age)	Caps	Goals	Club	Latest call-up
^{INJ} Player withdrew from the squad due to an injury.^{PRE} Preliminary squad.^{SUS} Player is serving a suspension.^{WD} Player withdrew for personal reasons.

=== Previous squads ===
CECAFA Women's Championship

- 2022 CECAFA Women's Championship squads

== Records ==
- Active players in **bold**, statistics correct **as of 2020**.

=== Most capped players ===
#	Player	Year(s)	Caps
1			
2			
3			
4			
5			
6			
7			
8			
9			
10			

=== Top goalscorers ===
**Rnk**	Player	**Goals**	**Caps**	**Ratio**	**Career**
1	Anne Marie Ibangarye	3	9	0.33	2016–present
2	Gloria Nibagwire	1	?	1	2014–present
2	Alice Kalimba	1	?	1	2014–present
2	Zawadi Usanase	1	?	1	??–present
2	Lydia Uzayisenga	1	?	1	??–present
2	Jeanette Mukeshimana	1	?	1	2018–present
2	Dorothea Mukeshimana	1	?	1	2016–present
2	Alice Niyoyita	1	5	0.2	2014–??
2	Jeanne Nyirahatashima	1	5	0.2	2014–??
2	Clementine Mukamana	1	5	0.2	2014–??

== Competitive record ==
=== FIFA Women's World Cup ===
FIFA Women's World Cup record
Year	Round	Position	Pld	W	D*	L	GS	GA
(China) 1991	did not enter							
(Sweden) 1995	did not enter							
(United States) 1999	did not enter							
(United States) 2003	did not enter							
(China) 2007	did not enter							
(Germany) 2011	did not enter							
(Canada) 2015	did not qualify							
(France) 2019	did not enter							
(Australia) (New Zealand) 2023	withdrew							
(Brazil) 2027	To be determined							
**Appearances**	**0/10**	–	–	–	–	–	–	–

=== Olympic Games ===
Summer Olympics record
Year	Round	Position	Pld	W	D*	L	GS	GA
(United States) 1996	did not enter							
(Australia) 2000	did not enter							
(Greece) 2004	did not enter							
(China) 2008	did not enter							
(United Kingdom) 2012	did not enter							
(Brazil) 2016	did not enter							
(Japan) 2020	did not enter							
(France) 2024	did not qualify							
(United States) 2028	to be determined							
**Appearances**	**0/8**	–	–	–	–	–	–	–

=== Women's Africa Cup of Nations ===
Africa Women Cup of Nations record
Year	Round	Position	Pld	W	D*	L	GS	GA
1991	did not enter							
1995	did not enter							
(Nigeria) 1998	did not enter							
(South Africa) 2000	did not enter							
(Nigeria) 2002	did not enter							
(South Africa) 2004	did not enter							
(Nigeria) 2006	did not enter							
(Equatorial Guinea) 2008	did not enter							
(South Africa) 2010	did not enter							
(Equatorial Guinea) 2012	did not enter							
(Namibia) 2014	did not qualify							
(Cameroon) 2016	did not enter							
(Ghana) 2018	did not enter							
2020	did not enter, tournament was later canceled							
(Morocco) 2022	Withdrew							
(Morocco) 2024	Did not qualify							
**Appearances**	**0/14**	–	–	–	–	–	–	–

=== African Games ===
African Games record
Year	Round	Position	Pld	W	D*	L	GS	GA
(Nigeria) 2003	did not enter							
(Algeria) 2007	did not enter							
(Mozambique) 2011	did not enter							
(Republic of the Congo) 2015	did not enter							
(Morocco) 2019	See Rwanda women's national under-20 football team							
(Ghana) 2023	See Rwanda women's national under-20 football team							
(Egypt) 2027	to be determined							
**Appearances**	**0/6**	–	–	–	–	–	–	–

=== CECAFA Women's Championship ===
CECAFA Women's Championship record
Year	Round	Position	Pld	W	D*	L	GS	GA
(Zanzibar) 1986	did not enter							
(Uganda) 2016	Group Stage	6th	2	0	0	2	4	6
(Rwanda) 2018	Group Stage	5th	4	1	1	2	3	7
(Tanzania) 2019	did not enter							
(Djibouti) 2021	did not enter, tournament was later canceled							
(Uganda) 2022	Group Stage	5th	3	1	0	2	3	4
**Appearances**	**Group Stage**	**5th**	**9**	**2**	**1**	**6**	**10**	**17**

== See also ==
- Football in Rwanda
- Sport in Rwanda
