= Chardente Saya Ndoulou =

Congolese women's footballer

Personal information
- Date of birth: 15 August 1990 (age 36)
- Place of birth: Zanaga, Congo
- Position: Forward

Senior career*
Years	Team	Apps	(Gls)
2009–2010	Évreux FC 27	9	(9)
2011–2013	Compiègne	30	(28)
2013–2014	FCF Arras	9	(2)

International career^{‡}
? – ?	Congo	?	(?)
- * Club domestic league appearances and goals as of 30 May 2020 ‡ National team caps and goals as of 30 May 2020

Chardente Saya Ndoulou (also spelt Saya-Ndoulou, born 15 August 1990) is a Congolese women's footballer who played as a forward.

== Personal life ==
Saya Ndoulou is from Zanaga, Republic of the Congo. Saya Ndoulou is the sister of Congolese footballer Laure Koléla. In 2008, Saya Ndoulou and Koléla fled Congo due to the war there, and claimed asylum in France.

== Club career ==
In the 2009–10 Division 2 Féminine season, Saya Ndoulou played for Évreux FC 27, scoring nine goals in nine appearances. In the 2011–12 season, Saya Ndoulou scored 22 goals for Division 2 Féminine side Union sportive Compiègne Club Oise, making her the division's top scorer. She scored six goals in eight appearances for Compiègne in the 2012–13 season. During the season, she transferred to Division 1 Féminine side FCF Arras. Arras lost 1–4 in the first match that Saya Ndoulou played for them. Saya Ndoulou scored two goals in nine appearances during the 2012–13 Division 1 Féminine.

== International career ==
She has been co-captain of the Congo women's national football team, alongside Laure Koléla. She scored for Congo in a 2004 African Women's Championship qualification match against Equatorial Guinea.
