= Annet Nakimbugwe =

Ugandan and DR Congolese footballer

Personal information
- Place of birth: Uganda
- Position: Midfielder

Senior career*
Years	Team	Apps	(Gls)
2008	Source de Kivu		
2009	APR		
- Buikwe She Red Stars

International career^{‡}
2000–2002	Uganda	4+	(2)
2006–2008	DR Congo U20	4+	(0+)
- * Club domestic league appearances and goals ‡ National team caps and goals as of 17 November 2000

Annet Nakimbugwe is a footballer who plays as a midfielder. She has been a member of the Uganda women's national team and the DR Congo U20s.

== Club career ==
Nakimbugwe has played for Source de Kivu in the Democratic Republic of the Congo, for APR FC in Rwanda and for Buikwe She Red Stars in Uganda.

== International career ==
Nakimbugwe capped for Uganda at senior level during the 2000 African Women's Championship and the 2002 African Women's Championship qualification.

=== International goals ===
Scores and results list Uganda goal tally first

No.	Date	Venue	Opponent	Score	Result	Competition
1	17 November 2000	Johannesburg, South Africa	Réunion	1–1	2–1	2000 African Women's Championship
2	13 October 2002	Kampala, Uganda	Ethiopia	1–0	2–2	2002 African Women's Championship qualification

=== Controversy ===
After Uganda withdrew from the 2004 African Women's Championship qualification prior the preliminary round matches against Malawi, Nakimbugwe and fellow Ugandan footballer Oliver Mbekeka moved abroad. Being in the Democratic Republic of the Congo, they were naturalized there as Annette Nshimire and Oliva Amani, respectively, and represented the country at the 2006 FIFA U-20 Women's World Championship. She also played the following edition in 2008.

== Personal life ==
Nakimbugwe's daughter, Hasifah Nassuna, is also a footballer and both have faced each other in Ugandan women's league matches.
