= Fatuma Issa Maonyo =

Tanzanian footballer

Fatuma Maonyo
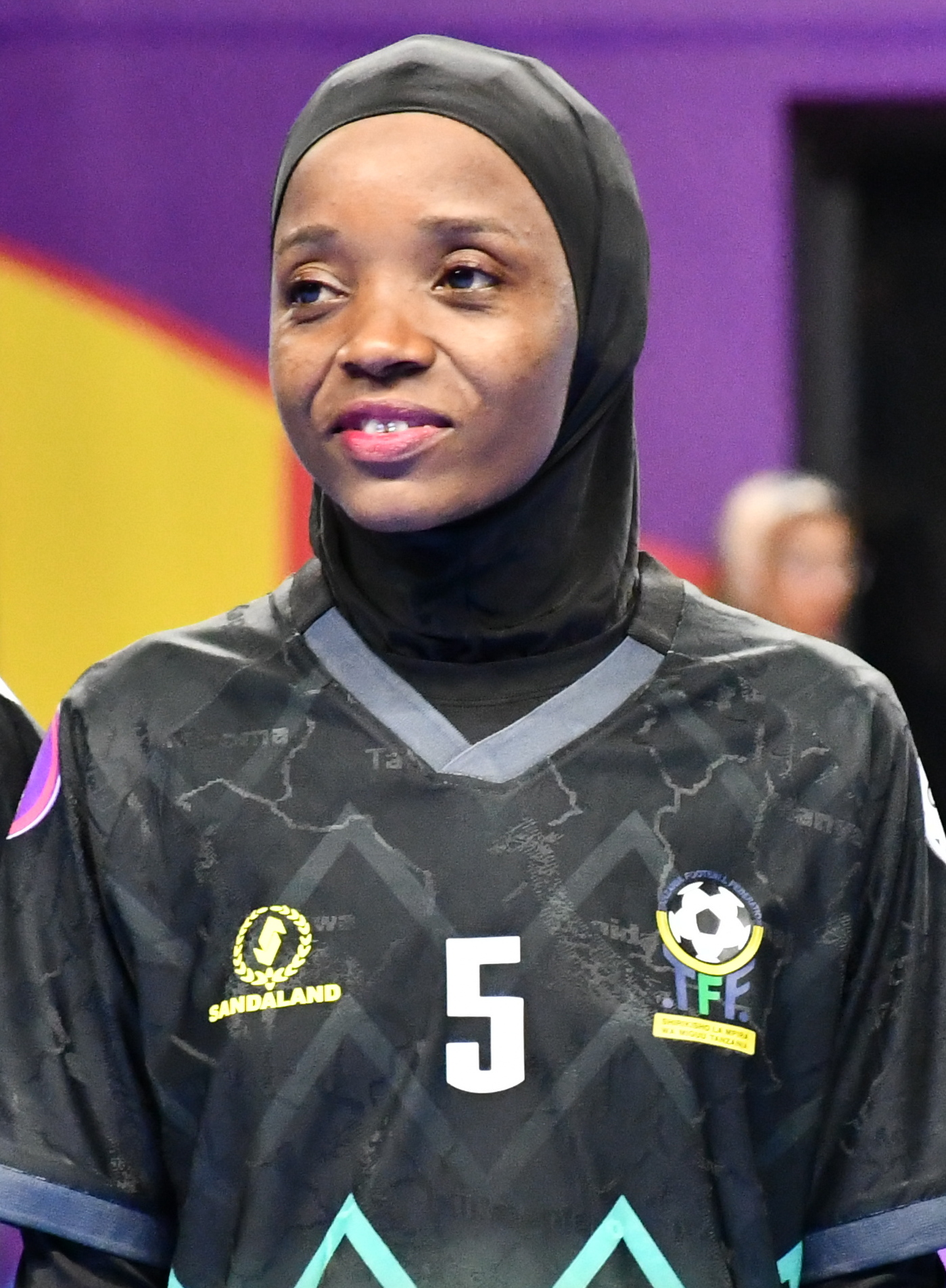
- Fatuma during 2025 WAFCON Futsal.

Personal information
- Full name: Fatuma Issa Maonyo
- Date of birth: 9 April 1995 (age 31)
- Place of birth: Tanzania
- Position: Defender

Team information
- Current team: Simba Queens

Senior career*
Years	Team	Apps	(Gls)
- Simba Queens

International career
- Tanzania
- * Club domestic league appearances and goals as of 2 March 2022

Fatuma Issa Maonyo (born 9 April 1995) is a Tanzanian professional footballer who plays as a defender for Simba Queens and the Tanzania women's national team.

== International career ==
In July 2018, Maonyo won the 2018 CECAFA Women's Championship with Tanzania after defeating Ethiopia by 4–1 in their final match. She was also adjudged the best player of the tournament at the end.

== Honours ==
- CECAFA Women's Championship: 2018
- CECAFA Women's Championship Player of the Tournament: 2018
