= 2002 African Women's Championship qualification =

Tournament details
- Dates: 10 August – 13 October 2002
- Teams: 21 (from 1 confederation)

Tournament statistics
- Matches played: 22
- Goals scored: 70 (3.18 per match)
- Top scorer(s): (Angola) Guigui (Gabon) Géraldine Okawe (South Africa) Joanne Solomon (Zimbabwe) Nomsa Moyo (4 goals)

The 2002 African Women's Championship qualification process was organized by the Confederation of African Football (CAF) to decide the participating teams of the 2002 African Women's Championship. Nigeria qualified automatically as both hosts and defending champions, while the remaining seven spots were determined by the qualifying rounds, which took place from August to October 2002.

== Teams ==
A record 21 national teams participated in the qualifying process.

Teams who withdrew are in italics.

Round	Teams entering round	No. of teams
First round	Angola; Botswana; Equatorial Guinea; Eritrea; Ethiopia; Gabon; Guinea-Bissau; Ivory Coast; Mali; São Tomé and Príncipe; Senegal; Swaziland; Tanzania; Zambia	14
Second round	Cameroon; DR Congo; Ghana; Morocco; South Africa; Uganda; Zimbabwe	7
Qualifying rounds	Total	21
Final tournament	Nigeria (hosts and defending champions)	1

== Format ==
Qualification ties were played on a home-and-away two-legged basis. If the aggregate score was tied after the second leg, the away goals rule would be applied, and if still level, the penalty shoot-out would be used to determine the winner (no extra time would be played).

The seven winners of the final round qualified for the final tournament.

== Schedule ==
The schedule of the qualifying rounds was as follows.

Round	Leg	Date
First round	First leg	10–11 August 2002
First round	Second leg	24 August 2002
Second round	First leg	21–22 September 2002
Second round	Second leg	11–13 October 2002

== First round ==
Team 1	Agg.	Team 2	1st leg	2nd leg
Zambia	w/o^{1}	Botswana	—	—
Ethiopia	w/o^{1}	Swaziland	—	—
Eritrea	4–5	Tanzania	2–3	2–2
Angola	6–1	Equatorial Guinea	3–0	3–1
São Tomé and Príncipe	0–8	Gabon	0–2	0–6
Senegal	w/o^{1}	Guinea-Bissau	—	—
Ivory Coast	4–4 (a)	Mali	3–3	1–1

- ^{1} Botswana, Guinea-Bissau and Swaziland withdrew.
10–11 August 2002

Zambia	Cancelled	Botswana

Zambia won by default and advanced to the second round.

10–11 August 2002

Ethiopia	Cancelled	Swaziland

Ethiopia won by default and advanced to the second round.

10 August 2002

Eritrea	2–3	Tanzania
Mebrahtu 3'; Debessay 47'	Report	Kavena 20'; Paul 31'; Chambruma 45'

Asmara
Referee: Constance Adipo (Uganda)
24 August 2002

Tanzania	2–2	Eritrea
Mosi 54'; Chambruma 89'	Report	Tekeste 7'; Bereket-ab 17'

Dar es Salaam
Referee: Viviana Mbula Mukulu (DR Congo)

Tanzania won 5–4 on aggregate and advanced to the second round.

11 August 2002

Angola	3–0	Equatorial Guinea
Guigui 3', 78'; Mvunbio 83'	Report

Luanda
Referee: Eugenie Akono Ondo (Cameroon)
24 August 2002

Equatorial Guinea	1–3	Angola
Añonman 10'	Report	Mvunbio 20'; Guigui 39' de Souza 86'

Malabo
Referee: Chimene Nombault Nuptia (Congo)

Angola won 6–1 on aggregate and advanced to the second round.

10 August 2002

São Tomé and Príncipe	0–2	Gabon
	Report	Okawe 36' (pen.); Etoua 48'

São Tomé
Referee: Nodjigoto Tokinon Esther (Chad)
24 August 2002

Gabon	6–0	São Tomé and Príncipe
Okawe 24', 71', 81'; Etoua 25'; Nisame 45'; Mapangou 85'	Report

Libreville
Referee: Xonam Agboyi (Togo)

Gabon won 8–0 on aggregate and advanced to the second round.

10–11 August 2002

Senegal	Cancelled	Guinea-Bissau

Senegal won by default and advanced to the second round.

10 August 2002

Ivory Coast	3–3	Mali
Bancouly 27', 71'; Koudougnon 48'	Report	Konaté 7', 45'; N'Diaye 74'

Abidjan
Referee: Fatou Gaye (Senegal)
24 August 2002

Mali	1–1	Ivory Coast
N'Diaye 59'	Report	Bancouly 35'

Bamako
Referee: Abidoye Bola (Nigeria)

4–4 on aggregate. Mali won on the away goals rule and advanced to the second round.

== Second round ==
Team 1	Agg.	Team 2	1st leg	2nd leg
Zambia	1–8	South Africa	1–4	0–4
Ethiopia	4–2	Uganda	2–0	2–2
Tanzania	0–10	Zimbabwe	0–5	0–5
Angola	1–1 (5–4 p)	DR Congo	1–0	0–1
Gabon	0–4	Cameroon	0–0	0–4
Senegal	1–6	Ghana	0–3	1–3
Mali	0–0 (5–4 p)	Morocco	0–0	0–0

21 September 2002

Zambia	1–4	South Africa
Muchindu 64'	Report	Solomon 19', 40', 62'; Phewa 80'

Lusaka
Attendance: 5,000
Referee: Viviana Mbula Mukulu (DR Congo)
12 October 2002

South Africa	4–0	Zambia
Solomon 13'; Nteso 17'; Mlomo 36'; Phewa 47'	Report

Seisa Ramabodu Stadium, Bloemfontein
Attendance: 30,000
Referee: Rasoanirina Justine (Madagascar)

South Africa won 8–1 on aggregate and qualified for the final tournament.

22 September 2002

Ethiopia	2–0	Uganda
Adois 13'; Endegene-Leme (?)	Report

Addis Ababa
Referee: Ondo Akono (Cameroon)
13 October 2002

Uganda	2–2	Ethiopia
Nakimbugwe 20'; Mbekeka 51'	Report	Endegene-Leme 54'; Teramah 72'

Kampala
Referee: Loise Shitilu Limsi (Kenya)

Ethiopia won 4–2 on aggregate and qualified for the final tournament.

21 September 2002

Tanzania	0–5	Zimbabwe
	Report	Mpala 10'; Moyo 11', 40', 48'; Zulu 43'

Dar es Salaam
Referee: Constance Catherine Adipo (Uganda)
13 October 2002

Zimbabwe	5–0	Tanzania
Zulu 2', 76'; Moyo 9'; Mpala 34'; Phiri 62'	Report

Harare
Referee: Gladys Lengwe (Zambia)

Zimbabwe won 10–0 on aggregate and qualified for the final tournament.

22 September 2002

Angola	1–0	DR Congo
Ramos 38'	Report

Lubango
Referee: Esther Tokino Nodjigoto (Chad)
11 October 2002

DR Congo	1–0 (a.e.t.)	Angola
Binga 16'	Report
Penalties
	4–5

Kinshasa
Referee: Sabelo Sibindi (Zimbabwe)

1–1 on aggregate. Angola won the penalty shoot-out 5–4 and qualified for the final tournament.

21 September 2002

Gabon	0–0	Cameroon
	Report

Libreville
Referee: Chimene Nombault Nuptia (Congo)
12 October 2002

Cameroon	4–0	Gabon
Belemgoto 20' (pen.); Mekongo 72' (pen.); Anounga 90+1'; Mvie Manga 90+4'	Report

Stade de la Réunification, Douala
Referee: Eugénie Kouao (Ivory Coast)

Cameroon won 4–0 on aggregate and qualified for the final tournament.

22 September 2002

Senegal	0–3	Ghana
	Report	Amoah-Tetteh 24', 56'; Darku 29'

Stade Iba Mar Diop, Dakar
Referee: Xonam Agboyi (Togo)
12 October 2002

Ghana	3–1	Senegal
Okah 30'; Ohenewaa 51', 67'	Report	Gueye 81'

Kumasi
Referee: Bola Abidoye (Nigeria)

Ghana won 6–1 on aggregate and qualified for the final tournament.

22 September 2002

Mali	0–0	Morocco
	Report

Bamako
Referee: Fati Maman Babatchene (Benin)
11 October 2002

Morocco	0–0 (a.e.t.)	Mali
	Report
Penalties
	4–5

Rabat
Referee: Fatou Gaye (Senegal)

0–0 on aggregate. Mali won the penalty shoot-out 5–4 and qualified for the final tournament.

== Goalscorers ==
Angolan Jacinta Ramos, Gabonese Géraldine Okawe, South African Joanne Solomon and Zimbabwean Nomsa Moyo were the top scorers in the qualifying process. In total, 70 goals were scored by 44 different players.

4 goals

- (Angola) Jacinta Ramos
- (Gabon) Géraldine Okawe
- (South Africa) Joanne Solomon
- (Zimbabwe) Nomsa Moyo

3 goals

- (Ivory Coast) Rachel Bancouly
- (Zimbabwe) Esther Zulu

2 goals

- (Angola) Nadine Mvunbio
- (Ethiopia) Awasso Endegene-Leme
- (Gabon) Ornella Etoua
- (Ghana) Basilea Amoah-Tetteh
- (Ghana) Joyce Ohenewaa
- (Mali) Maïchata Konaté
- (Mali) Diaty N'Diaye
- (South Africa) Veronica Phewa
- (Tanzania) Ester Chambruma
- (Zimbabwe) Precious Mpala

1 goal

- (Angola) Sonia de Souza
- (Cameroon) Antoinette Anounga
- (Cameroon) Rolande Belemgoto
- (Cameroon) Cecile Mekongo
- (Cameroon) Etebe Mvie Manga
- (Democratic Republic of the Congo) Louyeye Binga
- (Equatorial Guinea) Genoveva Añonman
- (Eritrea) Semhar Bereket-ab
- (Eritrea) Teamu Debessay
- (Eritrea) Makda Mebrahtu
- (Eritrea) Merhawit Tekeste
- (Ethiopia) Feleke Adois
- (Ethiopia) Tesfaye Teramah
- (Gabon) Winie Mapangou
- (Gabon) Gladys Nisame
- (Ghana) Memuna Darku
- (Ghana) Sheila Okah
- (Ivory Coast) Adélaïde Koudougnon
- (Senegal) Absah Gueye
- (South Africa) Nandipha Mlomo
- (South Africa) Mapule Nteso
- (Tanzania) Mwaka Kavena
- (Tanzania) Ally Mosi
- (Tanzania) Sweet Paul
- (Uganda) Oliver Mbekeka
- (Uganda) Annet Nankimbugwe
- (Zambia) Christabel Muchindu
- (Zimbabwe) Pretty Phiri

== Qualified teams ==
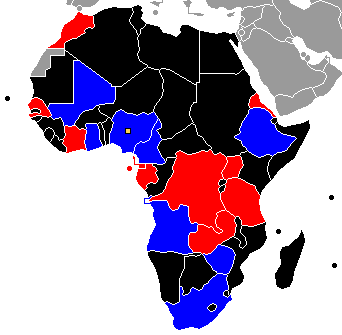
Qualified Did not qualify Did not enter or withdrew Not part of CAF

The following teams qualified for the final tournament.

Team	Qualified as	Qualified on	Previous appearances in tournament^{1}
Nigeria	Hosts and defending champions	19 March 2002	4 (**1991**, **1995**, **1998**, **2000**)
Angola	Winners against DR Congo	11 October 2002	1 (1995)
Mali	Winners against Morocco	11 October 2002	Debut
South Africa	Winners against Zambia	12 October 2002	3 (1995, 1998, 2000)
Cameroon	Winners against Gabon	12 October 2002	3 (1991, 1998, 2000)
Ghana	Winners against Senegal	12 October 2002	4 (1991, 1995, 1998, 2000)
Ethiopia	Winners against Uganda	13 October 2002	Debut
Zimbabwe	Winners against Tanzania	13 October 2002	1 (2000)

^{1} Bold indicates champions for that year. Italic indicates hosts for that year.
