= Oliver Mbekeka =

Ugandan and Congolese football player and manager (born 1979)

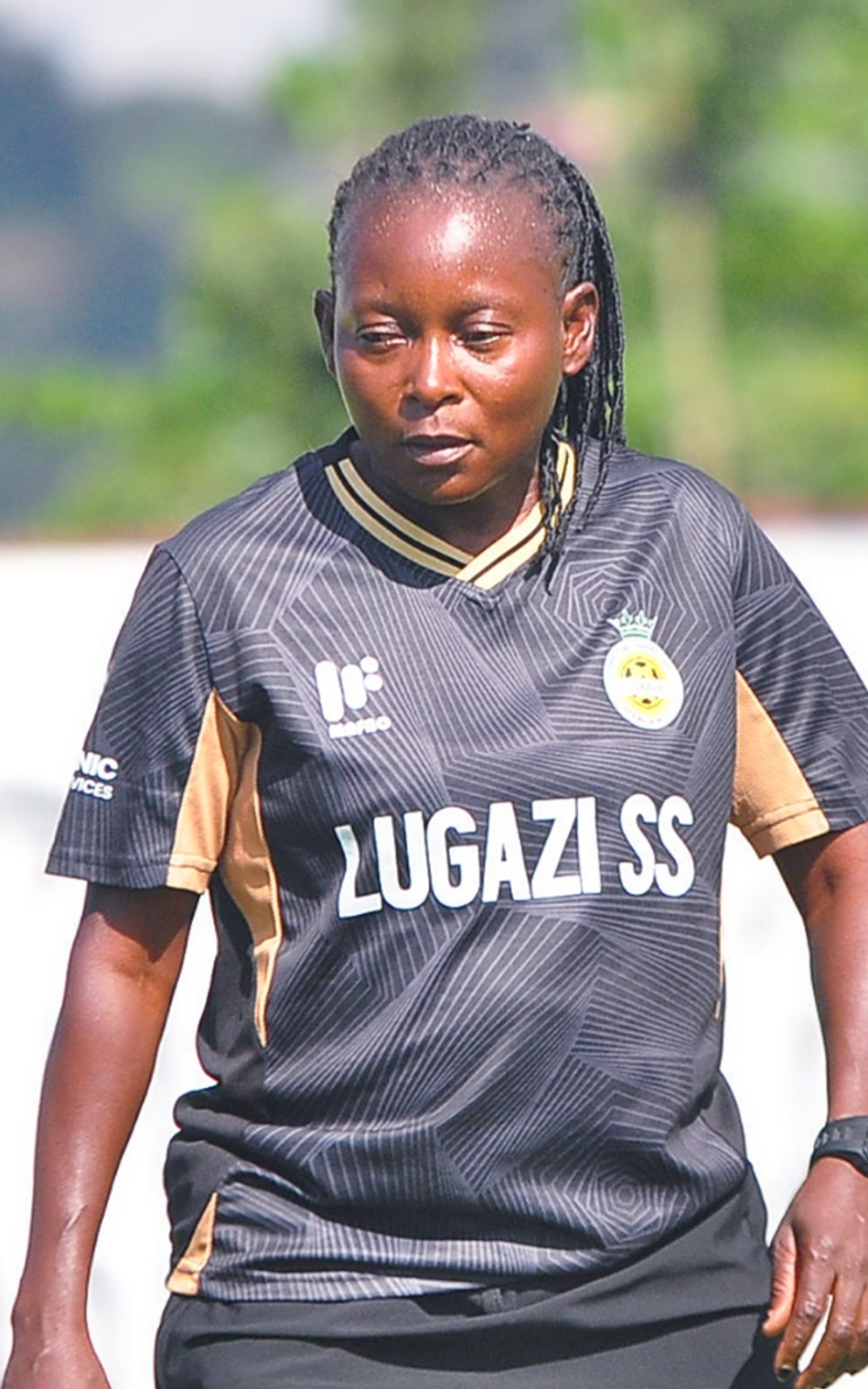
- Oliver Mbekeka in 2024

Personal information
- Full name: Oliver Amani Mbekeka
- Date of birth: 22 August 1979 (age 47)
- Place of birth: Uganda
- Height: 1.61 m (5 ft 3 in)
- Position: Forward

Senior career*
Years	Team	Apps	(Gls)
2006–2008	Source de Kivu		
2010–2012	APR		

International career^{‡}
2000–2002	Uganda	12	(2+)
- As Oliva Amani
2006–2008	DR Congo U20	6+	(1+)
2006	DR Congo	3+	(0+)

Managerial career
- Lady Doves Masindi
- Uganda Women U20
- * Club domestic league appearances and goals ‡ National team caps and goals as of 27 November 2008.

Oliver Amani Mbekeka (born 22 August 1979) is a football manager and former player who played as a forward. She is a former player of the Uganda and DR Congo national team, and the first woman to lead a men's team as a head coach in Uganda.

== Club career ==
Mbekeka has played for Kampala Women, City Stars and She Corporate in Uganda, for Source de Kivu and OCL City in the Democratic Republic of the Congo and for APR FC in Rwanda.

== International career ==
Mbekeka capped for Uganda at senior level during the 2000 African Women's Championship and the 2002 African Women's Championship qualification. She has played in 12 international matches.

=== International goals ===
Scores and results list Uganda goal tally first

No.	Date	Venue	Opponent	Score	Result	Competition
1	17 November 2000	Johannesburg, South Africa	Réunion	2–1	2–1	2000 African Women's Championship
2	13 October 2002	Kampala, Uganda	Ethiopia	2–0	2–2	2002 African Women's Championship qualification

=== Controversy ===
After Uganda withdrew from the 2004 African Women's Championship qualification prior the preliminary round matches against Malawi, Mbekeka and fellow Ugandan footballer Annet Nakimbugwe moved abroad. Being in the Democratic Republic of the Congo, they were naturalized there as Oliva Amani and Annette Nshimire, respectively, and represented the country at the 2006 FIFA U-20 Women's World Championship. She ended up playing for the DR Congo at senior level during the 2006 African Women's Championship.

== Managerial career ==
Mbekeka has coached Lady Doves Masindi in Uganda and the Uganda women's national under-20 football team.

Oliver Mbekeka is the Head Coach and Interim Manager for Lugazi FC.

== See also ==
- Lady Doves FC
- 2006 FIFA U-20 Women's World Championship
