= Ethiopian Women's Premier League =

Women's section of professional association football league in Ethiopia

- Founded: 2012
- Country: Ethiopia
- Confederation: CAF
- Number of clubs: 20 (11 in Division 1) (9 in Division 2)
- Level on pyramid: 1
- International cup: CAF W-Champions League
- Current champions: CBE FC (2022-23)
- Most championships: Dedebit (6)
- Top scorer: Loza Abera (274 goals)
- Current: 2025–26

The Ethiopian Women's Premier League (Amharic: የሴቶች ፕሪምየር ሊግ) is the top Women's association football league in Ethiopia. It is regulated by the Ethiopian Football Federation and divided into two division, division 1 (the top division) and division 2 ( the second division).

== History ==
The league was founded in 2012 (2005 E.C.).

Dedebit won their 2nd title in the 2015-16 season. Ethiopia Nigd Bank's striker Shitaye Sisay won the 2015-16 Most Valuable Player award. Loza Abera was top goal scorer at season's end with 10 goals in the playoffs and 47 goals during season competition.

Dedebit won its 3rd title in the 2016-17 season. After the 2016-17 season the first division was split into two divisions with the inaugural season of the Women's second division league set for the 2017-18 season.

The format of the league for the 2016-17 season had 20 teams in two groups (10 teams per group) with group winners fighting for the trophy at the end of the season. The 20 clubs that participated were a record high since the establishment of the league.

Dedebit were crowned champions for a third straight year earning the club's 4th title overall in its history. The Dedebit Women's team was disbanded the after 2017-18 season due to the club's financial problems.

Adama City won the 2018-19 league title, its first as a club. In 2021, Nigd Bank secured its fourth championship in the team's history, first since 2015, by virtue of 2-1 victory over Adama City. The 2020-21 second division was won by Bahir Dar Kenema, qualifying the team for the next season's first division competition. CBE FC won the first division title in the 2020-21 season.

== Clubs ==
=== Division 1 ===
The following 11 clubs competed in the Ethiopian Women's Premier League (Division 1) during the 2020-21 Season.

Club	Location	Stadium
Akaki Kality	Addis Abeba	Addis Abeba
CBE FC	Addis Abeba	Addis Abeba
Defense	Addis Abeba	Addis Abeba
Hawassa City	Hawassa	Hawassa Int.
Adama city	Adama	Abebe Bikila
Dire Dawa City	Dire Dawa	Dire Dawa
Gedeo Dilla	Dila	Dila
Addis Abeba City	Addis Abeba	Addis Abeba
Arba Minch City	Arba Minch	Arba Minch
Ethio Electric	Addis Abeba	Addis Abeba

=== Division 2 ===
The following 8 clubs competed in the Ethiopian Premier League (Division 2) during the 2020-21 Season.

Club
Kidus Giorgis
Bahir Dar
EWS Academy
Lideta Sub City (Addis Abeba)
Kirkos Sub City (Addis Abeba)
Fasil City
Bole Sub City (Addis Abeba)
Legetafo
Shashemene City
NIfas Silk Lafto
Tirunesh Dibaba Academy

== Previous Winners (First Division) ==
- 2004: Dedebit (Addis Abeba)
- 2012: Dedebit (Addis Abeba)
- 2012-13: Dedebit (Addis Abeba)
- 2013-14: CBE FC
- 2014-15: CBE FC
- 2015-16: Dedebit (Addis Abeba)
- 2016-17: Dedebit (Addis Abeba)
- 2017-18: Dedebit (Addis Abeba)
- 2018-19: Adama City (Adama)
- 2019-20: Season Cancelled
- 2020-21: CBE FC
- 2021-22: CBE FC
- 2022-23: CBE FC

== Top Goal Scorer (First Division) ==
Year	Country	Name	Team	Goals
2014-15	(Ethiopia)	Loza Abera	Dedebit	
2015-16	(Ethiopia)	Loza Abera	Dedebit	57*
2016-17	(Ethiopia)	Loza Abera	Dedebit	33
2017-18	(Ethiopia)	Loza Abera	Dedebit	17
2018-19	(Ethiopia)	Senaf Wakuma	Adama City	21
2019-20	N/A	N/A	N/A	N/A
2020-21	(Ethiopia)	Loza Abera	CBE FC	17
2021-22	(Ethiopia)	Loza Abera	CBE FC	34
2022-23	(Ethiopia)	Aregash Kalsa	CBE FC	23
2022-23	(Ethiopia)	Loza Abera	CBE FC	23
2025-26	(Ethiopia)	Dagmawit Solomon	Ethio Electric	24

Most goals by a player in a single season

- 57 goals.
  - Loza Abera (2015-16).

*including playoff goals
