= Christine Nambirige =

Ugandan footballer

Personal information
- Position: Winger

Senior career*
Years	Team	Apps	(Gls)
- She Corporates

International career^{‡}
2012–2018	Uganda	3+	(1+)
- * Club domestic league appearances and goals ‡ National team caps and goals as of 4 April 2018

Christine Nambirige is a Ugandan footballer who plays as a winger. She has been a member of the Uganda women's national team.

== Club career ==
Nambirige has played for She Corporates in Uganda.

== International career ==
Nambirige capped for Uganda at senior level during the 2012 African Women's Championship qualification, the 2016 CECAFA Women's Championship and the 2018 Africa Women Cup of Nations qualification.

=== International goals ===
Scores and results list Uganda goal tally first

No.	Date	Venue	Opponent	Score	Result	Competition
1	13 September 2016	Jinja, Uganda	Zanzibar	1–0	9–0	2016 CECAFA Women's Championship
