= Otandeka Laki =

Ugandan footballer (born 1996)

Personal information
- Full name: Otandeka Kanyesigye Laki
- Date of birth: 24 January 1996 (age 30)
- Place of birth: The Bronx, New York, U.S.
- Height: 1.61 m (5 ft 3 in)
- Positions: Winger; striker

Youth career
- 2010–2012: Colts Neck Cougars
- Match Fit Chelsea

Senior career*
Years	Team	Apps	(Gls)
2019	SV 67 Weinberg II	7	(3)
2019	SV 67 Weinberg	1	(0)
2019	MSV Duisburg II	13	(9)
2021	New Jersey Copa		
2022	Doncaster Rovers Belles		
2023	FK Saned	9	(2)
2024	MFA Žalgiris-MRU	1	(2)
2024	Doncaster Rovers Belles		
2025	Kayseri Kadın FK		
2026–	Coamo FC		

International career^{‡}
2014–	Uganda	6	(2)
- * Club domestic league appearances and goals as of 16 October 2026 ‡ National team caps and goals as of 5 October 2021.

Otandeka Kanyesigye Laki (born 24 January 1996) is a Ugandan footballer who plays as a winger and a striker for Coamo FC in Liga Puerto Rico Pro and the Uganda women's national team.

== Early life and education ==
Laki was born in The Bronx, New York, United States and raised in Marlboro Township, New Jersey to Ugandan parents – her father being an ambassador. She has attended the Colts Neck High School.

== Club career ==
Laki has played for SV 67 Weinberg and MSV Duisburg II in Germany and for New Jersey Copa in the United States.

Laki signed for English club Doncaster Rovers Belles in October 2022, making her debut against Peterborough United.

In 2023 she removed to Lithuania and joined FK Saned. On 3 August 2023 she made her debut in the Women's A League against FK Vilnius. On 13 September 2023 she scored a goal in the women's A league match against FC Gintra. The defending champions title FC Gintra crushed their rivals with a score of 10-1. On 17 September 2023 in the match against FK Vilnius he scored an honorary goal. Vilnius won a crushing victory with the result 11-1.

In 2024 Laki transferred to MFA Žalgiris-MRU. On 17 March 2024 MFA Žalgiris-MRU crushed FK Saned with a score of 21-0. Laki scored two goals in this match.

In September 2024, Laki returned to Doncaster Rovers Belles.

== International career ==
Laki was capped for Uganda at senior level during the 2016 CECAFA Women's Championship, where she scored two goals, and the 2021 COSAFA Women's Championship.

=== International goals ===
Scores and results list Uganda goal tally first

No.	Date	Venue	Opponent	Score	Result	Competition
1	13 September 2016	Jinja, Uganda	Zanzibar	?–0	9–0	2016 CECAFA Women's Championship
2	13 September 2016	Jinja, Uganda	Zanzibar	?–0	9–0	2016 CECAFA Women's Championship

== Personal life ==
Nicknamed Oti, Laki has studied journalism and media studies at the Rutgers University.

== See also ==
- Ugandan Americans
