= Rehima Zergaw =

Ethiopian footballer

Personal information
- Full name: Rehima Zergaw
- Place of birth: Ethiopia
- Position: Forward

International career
Years	Team	Apps	(Gls)
2007–2022	Ethiopia		

Rehima Zergaw (sometimes written as Rehima Zerga or Rehima Zerega) is a retired Ethiopian footballer who played as a forward for the Ethiopia women's national team. She is known for her goal-scoring performances in regional competitions.

== Playing style ==
Rehima Zergaw played as a forward and was known for her goal-scoring ability and attacking presence, particularly in regional tournaments.

== International career ==
She is a member of the Ethiopia women's national team also known as the "Lucy" and represented the country in several competitions including the CECAFA women's championship. She was part of the Ethiopia's squad for the 2016 CECAFA women's championship in Uganda.

In September 2016, she scored a hat-trick in Ethiopia's 4–1 victory over Uganda to secure third place in the tournament.

She was also included in the national teams squad for major tournaments, including African Women's Championship qualifiers which took place in Cameroon in 2016.

Zergaw has been part of the national team setup for several years, been called up as early as the 2000s and contributing through the 2010s.

== Club career ==
At club level, she played in the Ethiopian Women's Premier League and was associated with clubs such as Commercial Bank of Ethiopia (CBE).

She was active during a time when the league was expanding, with teams like Dedebit achieving domestic success.

== Later career ==
Rehima retired from international football in 2022 after sustaining an injury.

She was subsequently honored by the Ethiopian Football Federation for her long service to the national team.
