= Meselu Abera =

Kenyan footballer

Personal information
- Position: Forward

International career
Years	Team	Apps	(Gls)
- Ethiopia

Meselu Abera Tesfamariam is an Ethiopian professional footballer who plays as a forward for and the Ethiopia women's national team. In 2018, she scored three goals in the 2018 CECAFA Women's Championship to win the top goal scorer of the competition award.
