= Felicia Eze =

Nigerian footballer

Personal information
- Date of birth: 27 September 1974
- Date of death: 31 January 2012 (aged 37)
- Place of death: Anambra State, Nigeria

Felicia Eze // (27 September 1974 – 31 January 2012) was a Nigerian footballer. She competed for Nigeria at the 2004 Summer Olympics. Eze died on 31 January 2012 in Anambra State after a brief illness, aged 37.

== See also ==
- Football at the 2004 Summer Olympics
