= Lillian Mutuuzo =

Ugandan footballer (born 2002)

Lilian Mutuuzo
Personal information
- Date of birth: 22 December 2002 (age 23)
- Position: Forward

Team information
- Current team: Kampala Queens

Senior career*
Years	Team	Apps	(Gls)
- Kampala Queens

International career^{‡}
2018–	Uganda		
- * Club domestic league appearances and goals ‡ National team caps and goals as of 26 October 2021

Lilian Mutuuzo (born 22 December 2002) is a Ugandan footballer who plays as a forward for FUFA Women Super League club Kampala Queens and the Uganda women's national team.

== Club career ==
Mutuuzo has played for Kampala Queens in Uganda.

== International career ==
Mutuuzo capped for Uganda at senior level during the 2018 CECAFA Women's Championship.
