= Grace Nyinawumuntu =

Rwandan footballer (born 1981)

Marie Grace Nyinawumuntu (born 16 December 1982) is a Rwandan football manager, referee and former footballer.

== Biography ==
=== Personal life ===
Nyinawumuntu was born in 1982. Her father died in the Rwandan genocide in 1994. She has been married to a lawyer.

Nyinawumuntu grew up playing sports with her male cousins. Nyinawumuntu attended the Lycée de Kigali in Rwanda. She then obtained a bachelor's degree in physical education and sport and Master's degree in Business Administration.

=== Playing career ===
Nyinawumuntu played for the city of Kigali, where she was described as "her impressive performances earned her a place in the national team". Nyinawumuntu mainly operated as a central defender.

=== Managerial career and referee ===
Nyinawumuntu became the first Rwandan female international referee and the first Rwandan female national football manager. Nyinawumuntu attended a coaching course in Germany in 2008. She managed Rwandan side AS Kigali, helping the club win the league.
