= Vera Okolo =

Nigerian footballer

Personal information
- Full name: Vera Okolo
- Date of birth: 5 January 1985 (age 41)
- Place of birth: Nigeria
- Height: 1.61 m (5 ft 3 1/2 in)

International career
Years	Team	Apps	(Gls)
- Nigeria

Vera Okolo (born 5 January 1985) is a Nigerian footballer who plays for the Nigeria women's national football team. She played for the Delta Queens in the Nigerian Women's Championship.

== Playing career ==
=== International ===
Okolo was put forward for the team at the 2004 Olympics by coach Isamaila Mabo. After the matches she was nominated to be African Women's Footballer of the Year but the award was eventually given to Perpetua Nkwocha.

She played in Algiers in 2007 and scored the game-winning goal. Okolo was amongst the team who refused to return from Algiers until they were paid. They had been promised money when they returned to Nigeria, but they had learned from experience that such promises would be broken. Each team member was eventually paid $1m Nigerian by the President.

Okolo was involved in a dispute with the Nigerian Football Association following her injury in 2007 whilst playing for her country. She wanted an operation in Germany but there was a dispute about who would pay for it.
