= Jacky Ogol =

Kenyan footballer (born 1994)

Personal information
- Full name: Jacky Akinyi Ogol
- Date of birth: 2 December 1994 (age 31)
- Position: Midfielder

Senior career*
Years	Team	Apps	(Gls)
- Spedag

International career
- Kenya
- * Club domestic league appearances and goals

Jacky Akinyi Ogol (born 2 December 1994) is a Kenyan footballer who plays as a midfielder. She has been a member of the Kenya women's national team.

== International career ==
Ogol played for Kenya at the 2016 Africa Women Cup of Nations.

== See also ==
- List of Kenya women's international footballers
