= Nodjigoto Tokinon Esther =

Chadian football referee

Nodjigoto Tokinon Esther is a Chadian football referee.

== Early life ==
She is a native of Sarh, Chad.

== Education ==
She attended Ecole Nationale d’Education Physique et Sportive in Chad.

== Career ==
She worked as a referee, physical trainer for referees, match commissioners for referees and Confederation of African Football Panel instructor. She refereed at the 2002 African Women's Championship.

== Personal life ==
She has a daughter and two grandsons.
