= Gloria Nibagwire =

Rwandan footballer

Personal information
- Full name: Gloria Sifa Nibagwire
- Date of birth: 14 August 1982 (age 44)

International career
Years	Team	Apps	(Gls)
- Rwanda

Gloria Sofa Nibagwire (born 14 August 1982) is a Rwandan footballer who captains the Rwanda women's national team.

== International career ==
Nibagwire capped for Rwanda at senior level during the 2014 African Women's Championship qualification.
