= Germiston Stadium =

Sports venue in Germiston, South Africa

Coordinates: 26°13′40.36″S 28°10′29.46″E

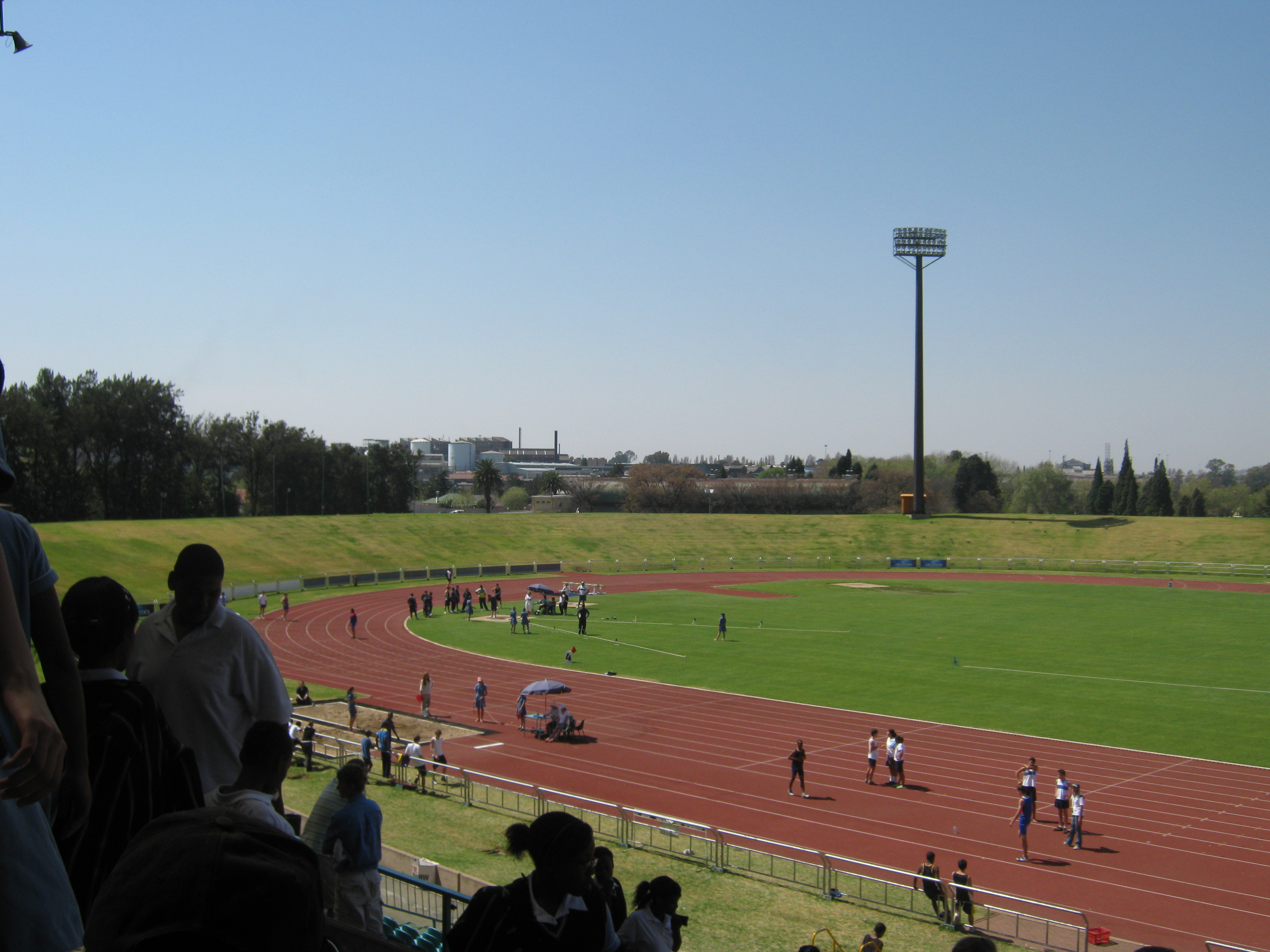
Germiston Stadium during a school athletics competition.

Germiston Stadium (formerly the Herman Immelman Stadium) is a multi-purpose stadium in Germiston, South Africa. It is currently used mostly for rugby matches and track events. Germiston Stadium is the home stadium of Germiston Simmer Rugby Club and Germiston Football Club. It is also used for inter-school athletic events and as a training venue for teams such as Bafana Bafana (the South African National Football Team) and the Lions. The stadium holds 18,000 people.
