= Donisia Minja =

Tanzanian footballer (born 1999)

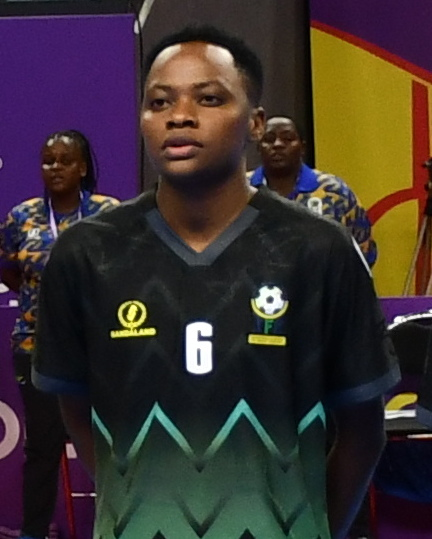
- Donisia during 2025 WAFCON Futsal.

Personal information
- Full name: Donisia Daniel Minja
- Date of birth: 9 August 1999 (age 27)
- Place of birth: Tanzania
- Position: Defender

Team information
- Current team: Yanga Princess

Senior career*
Years	Team	Apps	(Gls)
- Yanga Princess

International career
- Tanzania
- * Club domestic league appearances and goals as of 2 March 2022

Donisia Daniel Minja (born 9 August 1999) is a Tanzanian professional footballer who plays as a forward for Yanga Princess and the Tanzania women's national team.

== International career ==
In 2018, Minja scored three goals in the 2018 CECAFA Women's Championship to win the top goal scorer of the competition award.

== Honours ==
- CECAFA Women's Championship: 2018
- CECAFA Women's Championship Top Scorer : 2018
