= Nomsa Moyo =

Zimbabwean footballer

Personal information
- Full name: Tapfuma Nomsa Moyo
- Position: Midfielder

Senior career*
Years	Team	Apps	(Gls)
- New Orleans

International career
- Zimbabwe
- * Club domestic league appearances and goals

Tapfuma Nomsa Moyo, known as Nomsa Moyo, is a Zimbabwean former footballer who played as a midfielder. Nicknamed Boys or Boyz, she has been a member of the Zimbabwe women's national team.

== Club career ==
Moyo has played for New Orleans in Zimbabwe.

== International career ==
Moyo capped for Zimbabwe at senior level during the 2000 African Women's Championship and two Africa Women Cup of Nations qualifications (2002 and 2004).

=== International goals ===
Scores and results list Zimbabwe goal tally first

No.	Date	Venue	Opponent	Score	Result	Competition
1	30 July 2000	Rufaro Stadium, Harare, Zimbabwe	Lesotho	1–0	4–0	2000 African Women's Championship qualification
2	30 July 2000	Rufaro Stadium, Harare, Zimbabwe	Lesotho	2–0	4–0	2000 African Women's Championship qualification
3	30 July 2000	Rufaro Stadium, Harare, Zimbabwe	Lesotho	3–0	4–0	2000 African Women's Championship qualification
4	30 July 2000	Rufaro Stadium, Harare, Zimbabwe	Lesotho	4–0	4–0	2000 African Women's Championship qualification
5	11 November 2000	Boksburg, South Africa	Uganda	2–2	2–2	2000 African Women's Championship
6	24 November 2000	Boksburg, South Africa	Ghana	2–2	6–3	2000 African Women's Championship
7	21 September 2002	Dar es Salaam, Tanzania	Tanzania	2–0	5–0	2002 African Women's Championship qualification
8	21 September 2002	Dar es Salaam, Tanzania	Tanzania	3–0	5–0	2002 African Women's Championship qualification
9	21 September 2002	Dar es Salaam, Tanzania	Tanzania	5–0	5–0	2002 African Women's Championship qualification
10	13 October 2002	Harare, Zimbabwe	Tanzania	2–0	5–0	2002 African Women's Championship qualification
11	11 July 2004	Dar es Salaam, Tanzania	Tanzania	1–0	3–0	2004 African Women's Championship qualification
12	11 July 2004	Dar es Salaam, Tanzania	Tanzania	2–0	3–0	2004 African Women's Championship qualification
13	25 July 2004	Harare, Zimbabwe	Tanzania	1–0	4–0	2004 African Women's Championship qualification
14	25 July 2004	Harare, Zimbabwe	Tanzania	2–0	4–0	2004 African Women's Championship qualification
