= 2004 African Women's Championship qualification =

Tournament details
- Dates: 29 May – 25 July 2004
- Teams: 17 (from 1 confederation)

Tournament statistics
- Matches played: 16
- Goals scored: 72 (4.5 per match)
- Top scorer(s): (Ghana) Akua Anokyewaa (Ghana) Adjoa Bayor (6 goals)

The 2004 African Women's Championship qualification process was organized by the Confederation of African Football (CAF) to decide the participating teams of the 2004 African Women's Championship. South Africa qualified automatically as hosts, while the remaining seven spots were determined by the qualifying rounds, which took place from May to July 2004.

From this tournament onwards, the defending champions does not receive automatic qualification.

== Teams ==
A total of 17 national teams participated in the qualifying process.

Teams who withdrew are in italics.

Round	Teams entering round	No. of teams
Preliminary round	Congo; Equatorial Guinea; Eritrea; Malawi; Tanzania; Uganda	6
First round	Algeria; Cameroon; DR Congo; Ethiopia; Gabon; Ghana; Guinea; Mali; Nigeria; Senegal; Zimbabwe	11
Qualifying rounds	Total	17
Final tournament	South Africa (hosts)	1

== Format ==
Qualification ties were played on a home-and-away two-legged basis. If the aggregate score was tied after the second leg, the away goals rule would be applied, and if still level, the penalty shoot-out would be used to determine the winner (no extra time would be played).

The seven winners of the final round qualified for the final tournament.

== Schedule ==
The schedule of the qualifying rounds was as follows.

Round	Leg	Date
Preliminary round	First leg	29–30 May 2004
Preliminary round	Second leg	12 June 2004
First round	First leg	10–11 July 2004
First round	Second leg	23–25 July 2004

== Preliminary round ==
Team 1	Agg.	Team 2	1st leg	2nd leg
Equatorial Guinea	2–4	Congo	2–2	0–2
Malawi	w/o^{1}	Uganda	—	—
Tanzania	5–1	Eritrea	4–0	1–1

- ^{1} Uganda withdrew.
30 May 2004

Equatorial Guinea	2–2	Congo
Aguilera Angono 52', 60'	Report	Ndolou 24'; Mpassou 50'

Malabo
Referee: (Central African Republic)
12 June 2004

Congo	2–0	Equatorial Guinea
? 1H' ? 1H'	Report

Brazzaville

Congo won 4–2 on aggregate and advanced to the first round.

May 2004

Malawi	Cancelled	Uganda

Malawi won by default and advanced to the first round.

29 May 2004

Tanzania	4–0	Eritrea
Mtumwa 2', 7', 10'; Yusuf 14'	Report

Dar es Salaam
Referee: Jane Silungwe (Malawi)
12 June 2004

Eritrea	1–1	Tanzania
? 2H'	Report	? 1H'

Asmara

Tanzania won 5–1 on aggregate and advanced to the first round.

== First round ==
Team 1	Agg.	Team 2	1st leg	2nd leg
Congo	0–2	Cameroon	0–2	0–0
Malawi	0–9	Ethiopia	0–4	0–5
Tanzania	0–7	Zimbabwe	0–3	0–4
Mali	2–3	Algeria	2–2	0–1
Guinea	0–22	Ghana	0–13	0–9
Senegal	3–12	Nigeria	2–8	1–4
DR Congo	—	Gabon	—	—

11 July 2004

Congo	0–2	Cameroon
	Report	Mbida 15'; Ngo Ndoumbouk 75'

Stade Alphonse Massemba-Débat, Brazzaville
Referee: Bento Vila Nova Clara (São Tomé and Príncipe)
25 July 2004

Cameroon	0–0	Congo
	Report

Stade Ahmadou Ahidjo, Yaoundé
Referee: Maximina Luzia Bernado (Angola)

Cameroon won 2–0 on aggregate and qualified for the final tournament.

11 July 2004

Malawi	0–4	Ethiopia
	Report	Addis 6', 87'; Gebrekirstos 27'; Kemal 83'

Blantyre
Referee: Risina Kuda Majo (Zimbabwe)
25 July 2004

Ethiopia	5–0	Malawi
Gebrekirstos 24', 32', 53'; Seifu 57'; Addis 66'	Report

Addis Ababa
Referee: Kubingi Margre (Uganda)

Ethiopia won 9–0 on aggregate and qualified for the final tournament.

11 July 2004

Tanzania	0–3	Zimbabwe
	Report	Moyo 8', 64'; Kulunga 82'

Dar es Salaam
Referee: Limsisi Loise Shitilu (Kenya)
25 July 2004

Zimbabwe	4–0	Tanzania
Moyo 5', 30'; Simao 84'; Mathobela 90'	Report

Harare
Referee: Rasoanirina Justine (Madagascar)

Zimbabwe won 7–0 on aggregate and qualified for the final tournament.

11 July 2004

Mali	2–2	Algeria
N'Diaye 45'; Camara 71'	Report	Zerrouki 26', 58'

Bamako
Referee: Keita Aissatou (Guinea)
23 July 2004

Algeria	1–0	Mali
Zerrouki 15'	Report

Stade Mustapha Tchaker, Blida
Referee: Fatou Gaye (Senegal)

Algeria won 3–2 on aggregate and qualified for the final tournament.

11 July 2004

Guinea	0–13	Ghana
	Report	Okoe 10', 1H', 1H'; Anokyewaa 14', 1H', 1H'; Bayor 18', 1H', 84'; Darku 1H'; Baidu 2H'; Amenuku 2H', 2H'

Conakry
Referee: Athacou Agathe (Ivory Coast)
24 July 2004

Ghana	9–0	Guinea
Bayor 4', 23', 54'; Okoe 10', 40'; Anokyewaa 14', 16', 48'; Foriwaa 56'	Report

Accra
Referee: Felicia Okwugba (Nigeria)

Ghana won 22–0 on aggregate and qualified for the final tournament.

10 July 2004

Senegal	2–8	Nigeria
Thiaw 53'; Diop 90'	Report	Uwak 8', 17', 89'; Avre 15', 35', 50', 66'; Ulunma 89'

Dakar
Referee: Maman Fati (Benin)
24 July 2004

Nigeria	4–1^{1}	Senegal
Uwak 6', 59'; Obi 49'; Titilayo 74'	Report	N'Diaye 66'

Warri
Referee: Amegee Aissata Ameyo (Togo)

^{1} The match was abandoned at the 76th minute after an officer from the riot police mistakenly fired tear gas which dispersed fans rushing to find an open space.

Nigeria won 12–3 on aggregate and qualified for the final tournament.

July 2004

DR Congo	Cancelled	Gabon

Originally, DR Congo qualified for the final tournament after Gabon withdrew. DR Congo subsequently withdrew, meaning CAF were required to select a lucky loser to qualify for the final tournament.

Team	Pld	W	D	L	GF	GA	GD	Pts
Mali	2	0	1	1	2	3	−1	1
Congo	2	0	1	1	0	2	−2	1
Tanzania	2	0	0	2	0	7	−7	0
Senegal	2	0	0	2	3	12	−9	0
Malawi	2	0	0	2	0	9	−9	0
Guinea	2	0	0	2	0	22	−22	0

Mali, as the lucky loser, thus qualified for the final tournament.

== Goalscorers ==
Akua Anokyewaa and Adjoa Bayor, both from Ghana, were the top scorers of the qualifying process with 6 goals each.

6 goals

- (Ghana) Akua Anokyewaa
- (Ghana) Adjoa Bayor

5 goals

- (Ghana) Florence Okoe
- (Nigeria) Cynthia Uwak

4 goals

- (Ethiopia) Birtukan Gebrekirstos
- (Nigeria) Patience Avre
- (Zimbabwe) Nomsa Moyo

3 goals

- (Ethiopia) Feleke Addis
- (Tanzania) Mwapewa Mtumwa

2 goals

- (Algeria) Dalila Zerrouki
- (Equatorial Guinea) Carmen Aguilera Angono
- (Ghana) Anita Amenuku

1 goal

- (Algeria) Naïma Bouhenni
- (Cameroon) Séraphine Mbida
- (Cameroon) Marlyse Ngo Ndoumbouk
- (Republic of the Congo) Ndiaye Mpassou
- (Republic of the Congo) Saya Ndolou
- (Ethiopia) Semira Kemal
- (Ethiopia) Helen Seifu
- (Ghana) Elizabeth Baidu
- (Ghana) Memuna Darku
- (Ghana) Gloria Foriwaa
- (Mali) Fatou Camara
- (Mali) Diaty N'Diaye
- (Nigeria) Ijeoma Obi
- (Nigeria) Melkuleyi Titilayo
- (Nigeria) Jerome Ulunma
- (Senegal) Awa Diop
- (Senegal) Mamy N'Diaye
- (Senegal) Bathe Thiaw
- (Tanzania) Mwanaidi Yusuf
- (Zimbabwe) Sharon Kulunga
- (Zimbabwe) Sithandekile Mathobela
- (Zimbabwe) Margaret Simao

Unknown goalscorers

- Congo: 2 additional goals
- Eritrea: 1 additional goal
- Tanzania: 1 additional goal

== Qualified teams ==
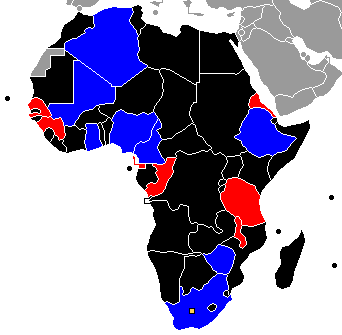
Qualified Did not qualify Did not enter or withdrew Not part of CAF

The following teams qualified for the final tournament.

Team	Qualified as	Qualified on	Previous appearances in tournament^{1}
South Africa	Hosts	12 December 2003	4 (1995, 1998, 2000, 2002)
Algeria	Winners against Mali	23 July 2004	Debut
Ghana	Winners against Guinea	24 July 2004	5 (1991, 1995, 1998, 2000, 2002)
Nigeria	Winners against Senegal	24 July 2004	5 (**1991**, **1995**, **1998**, **2000**, **2002**)
Cameroon	Winners against Congo	25 July 2004	4 (1991, 1998, 2000, 2002)
Ethiopia	Winners against Malawi	25 July 2004	1 (2002)
Zimbabwe	Winners against Tanzania	25 July 2004	2 (2000, 2002)
Mali	Lucky loser	July–August 2004	1 (2002)

^{1} Bold indicates champions for that year. Italic indicates hosts for that year.
