= Caledonian Stadium (Pretoria) =

Stadium in Gauteng, South Africa

- Interactive map of Caledonian Stadium
- Location: Pretoria, Gauteng, South Africa
- Coordinates: 25.74714°S 28.20098°E

Tenant
- Arcadia Shepherds F.C.

Caledonian Stadium is a multi-use stadium in Pretoria, Gauteng, South Africa. It is currently used mostly for football matches, and is the home venue of Arcadia Shepherds. The stadium was built specifically for Arcadia Shepherds in the 1950s. They left the stadium in 1974 but returned in 1997. In 2016, the club was threatened with an eviction order by the City of Tshwane mayor's office, who planned to turn the land into a public park.
