= 2018 CECAFA Women's Championship =

Tournament details
- Host country: Kigali, Rawanda
- Dates: 19–27 July 2018
- Teams: 5

Final positions
- Champions: Tanzania
- Runners-up: Uganda

Tournament statistics
- Top scorer(s): (Ethiopia) Meselu Abera (Tanzania) Donisia Minja
- Best player: (Tanzania) Fatuma Issa Maonyo

The 2018 CECAFA Women's Championship was the third edition of the association football tournament for women's national teams in the East African region. It was held in Kigali, Rwanda between 19 and 27 July 2018.

The defending champions Tanzania won the competition for the second time after defeating Ethiopia 4–1 in their final match on 27 July 2018.

== Participants ==
-	National teams
Participants	Ethiopia; Kenya; Rwanda(Hosts); Tanzania; Uganda
Non-participants	Burundi; Djibouti; Eritrea; Sudan; Somalia; South Sudan; Zanzibar

== Venue ==
The matches were played at one venue in the city of Kigali.

2018 CECAFA Women's Championship is located in Rwanda	Kigali
2018 CECAFA Women's Championship is located in Rwanda	Kigali Stadium
2018 CECAFA Women's Championship is located in Rwanda	Capacity: 22,000

== Draw ==
The tournament was played on a league basis with the team topping the table being declared the winner.

== Group stage ==
Pos	Team	Pld	W	D	L	GF	GA	GD	Pts
1	Tanzania	4	2	1	1	9	4	+5	7
2	Uganda	4	2	1	1	6	7	−1	7
3	Ethiopia	4	2	0	2	6	6	0	6
4	Kenya	4	1	1	2	3	3	0	4
5	Rwanda (H)	4	1	1	2	3	7	−4	4

Updated to match(es) played on unknown. Source:
(H) Hosts
19 July 2018

Kenya	0–1	Uganda
		Mutuuzo 7'

Kigali Stadium
19 July 2018

Rwanda	1–0	Tanzania
Kalimba 37'

Kigali Stadium

21 July 2018

Ethiopia	1–2	Uganda
Gebrekirstos 39'	Report	Aluka 68'; Yudaya 75'

Kigali Stadium
21 July 2018

Kenya	1–1	Tanzania
Shikobe 21'		Minja 13'

Kigali Stadium

23 July 2018

Tanzania	4–1	Uganda
Rashid 17', 45'; Minja 23'; Hamza 53'		Nankya 90+1'

Kigali Stadium
23 July 2018

Rwanda	0–3	Ethiopia
		Abera 32'; Feleke 66'; Wakuma 75'

Kigali Stadium

25 July 2018

Kenya	0–1	Ethiopia
		Abera 30'

Kigali Stadium
25 July 2018

Rwanda	2–2	Uganda
Ibangarye 62'; Mukeshimana 72'		Mutuuzo 52'; Alupo 74'

Kigali Stadium

27 July 2018

Ethiopia	1–4	Tanzania
Abera 29'	Report	Shurua 46'; Minja 56'; Abdallah 60'; Salum 90+2'

Kigali Stadium
27 July 2018

Rwanda	0–2	Kenya
	Report	Achieng 11' (pen.); Engesha 29'

Kigali Stadium

== Final standings ==
R	Team	P	W	D	L	GF	GA	GD	Pts.
1	Tanzania	4	2	1	1	9	4	+5	7
2	Uganda	4	2	1	1	6	7	-1	7
3	Ethiopia	4	2	0	2	6	6	0	6
4	Kenya	4	1	1	2	3	3	0	4
5	Rwanda	4	1	1	2	3	7	−4	4

== Statistics ==
=== Goalscorers ===
Top goal scorers;

3 goals

- (Ethiopia) Meselu Abera Tesfamariam
- (Tanzania) Donisia Daniel Minja

2 goals

- (Uganda) Lillian Mutuuzo

1 goal

- (Ethiopia) Birtukan Gebrekirstos
- (Ethiopia) Mirikat Feleke
- (Ethiopia) Senaf Wakuma
- (Kenya) Dorcas Shikobe
- (Kenya) Mercy Achieng
- (Kenya) Terry Engesha
- (Rwanda) Alice Kalimba
- (Tanzania) Asha Saada Rashid
- (Tanzania) Asha Shabani Hamza
- (Tanzania) Mwanahamisi Shurua
- (Tanzania) Stumai Abdallah Athumani
- (Tanzania) Fatuma Khatibu Salum
- (Uganda) Grace Aluka
- (Uganda) Yudaya Nakayenze
- (Uganda) Norah Alupo
- (Uganda) Shadia Nankya

=== Awards ===
The following awards were given at the conclusion of the tournament.

Player of the tournament	Best goalkeeper	Top scorer
(Tanzania) Issa Fatuma Maonyo	(Uganda) Ruth Aturo	(Ethiopia) Meselu Tesfamariam (Tanzania) Donisia Minja
FIFA Fair Play Award
Ethiopia
