= Abebe Bikila Stadium =

Stadium in Addis Ababa, Ethiopia

Coordinates: 09°02′35″N 38°43′26″E

- Interactive map of Abebe Bikila Stadium
- Full name: Abebe Bikila Stadium
- Location: Addis Ababa, Ethiopia
- Owner: Addis Abeba City Administration
- Operator: Addis Abeba Youth and Sport Bureau
- Capacity: 13,000
- Surface: Artificial turf

Construction
- Opened: 2002
- Renovated: 2017
- Cost: 105.5 million birr (2017 renovation)
- General contractor: Zhongmei Engineering Group Ltd. (2017 renovation)

Tenant
- Ethiopia national football team (selected matches)

Abebe Bikila Stadium (Amharic: አበበ ቢቂላ ስታዲያም) is a multi-purpose stadium in Addis Ababa, Ethiopia. It is currently used mostly for football matches, on club level it was used by Dedebit F.C. of the Ethiopian Premier League. The stadium has a capacity of 13,000 spectators. It is named after famed Olympic Marathon champion Abebe Bikila.

== History ==
The stadium hosted the final of the inaugural Ethiopian Super Cup in 2016.

In March 2017 the project to renovate the stadium was awarded to the Chinese firm Zhongmei Engineering Group Ltd. with the total cost of the project being 105.5 million Birr. The stadium was renovated in large part to ease congestion at Addis Ababa Stadium, while the city continues to construct the 62,000 seat Addis Ababa National Stadium.
