= Loza Abera =

Ethiopian football player (born 1997)

Loza Abera (ሎዛ አበራ)
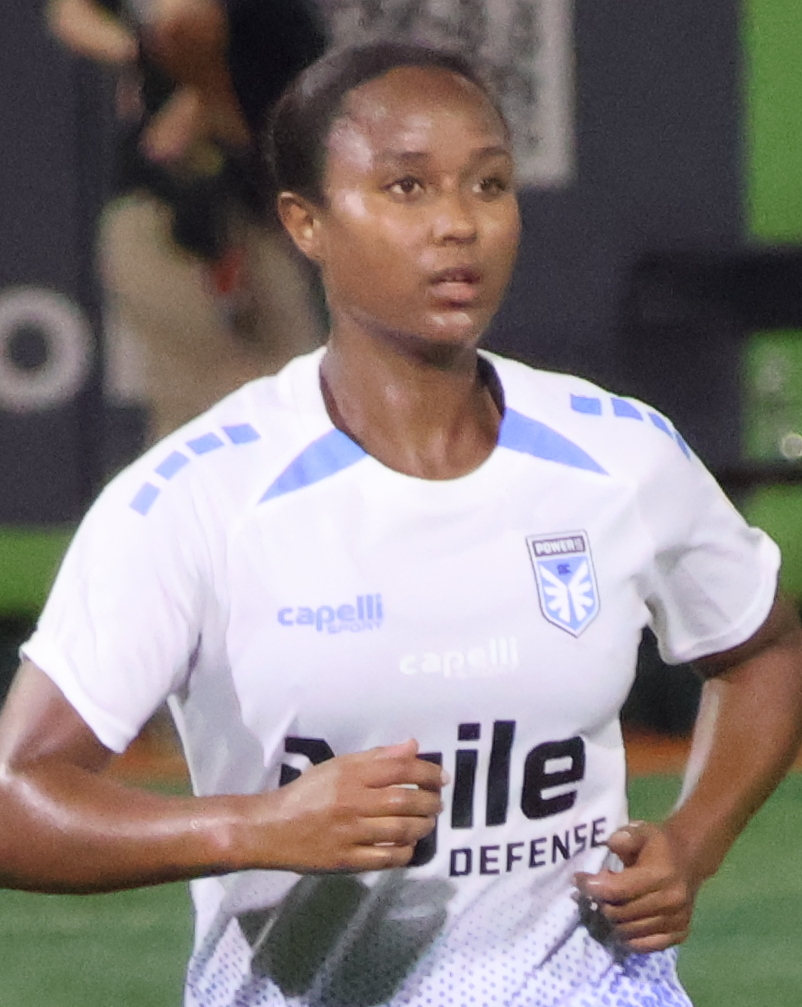
- Abera with DC Power FC in 2026

Personal information
- Full name: Loza Abera Geinore
- Date of birth: 2 October 1997 (age 29)
- Place of birth: Durame, Ethiopia
- Position: Forward

Team information
- Current team: DC Power FC
- Number: 30

Senior career*
Years	Team	Apps	(Gls)
2012–14	Hawassa City	28	(44)
2014–18	Dedebit	86	(148)
2018	Kungsbacka DFF	13	(9)
2018–19	Adama City	9	(17)
2020–2024	CBE F.C.	66	(74)
2023–2024	Virginia Marauders	11	(10)
2024-	DC Power FC	61	(18)

International career^{‡}
2011–2015	Ethiopia U20		
2015–	Ethiopia	31	(33)
- * Club domestic league appearances and goals ‡ National team caps and goals as of 25 October 2023

Loza Abera Geinore (Amharic: ሎዛ አበራ; born 2 October 1997) is an Ethiopian professional footballer who plays as a forward for USL Super League club DC Power FC and the Ethiopia national team.

== Early life ==
She was the third child of her family and the only female player in her neighborhood, she used to play football with mainly male composed teams both in school football matches and neighborhood football matches in her town Durame. Loza started playing football at the age of six. In 2011, she participated in the All Ethiopian Games, a tournament in which she represented the SNNP regional state and scored seven goals. That became her initial momentum to get noticed by Ethiopian women's national team recruiters.

== Club career ==
Abera joined her first professional club, Hawassa City S.C. Women, in 2012. Spending two years at the club, she helped the club to two 3rd-place finishes in the league while being the team's top goal scorer for both seasons.

After an invitation from then coach Asrat Abate, Abera joined Dedebit F.C. Women (now defunct). She spent four years at Dedebit F.C., winning the League and top goal scorer honors in all four years. She finished the 2015–16 EWPL season with 47 goals during season and 10 goals in the playoff competition. Despite lucrative offers from various teams, she made a promise to herself to finish high school. She did, and went on to Addis-Abeba University school of commerce while signing contracts from the area.

Abera signed with Adama City Women midway through the 2018–19 EWPL season after her brief stint in Sweden with Kungsbaka DFF. Continuing her success in her home country, she helped Adama City win its first ever EWPL title. After six seasons playing in the EWPL, Abera has scored over 200 goals and holds the record for most goals in the league's history. In November 2020, she signed for Nigd Bank of the Ethiopian Women's Premier League.

Abera has had trials with Antalyaspor (Turkey) and Kungsbaka DFF (Sweden). During her stay in Kungsbaka, she helped the team win a regional title and gain promotion to the top tier. However, her stay with the club ended after the season due to financial reasons.

In September 2019, she signed for Birkirkara F.C. (women) Women of the Malta Women's Premier League. She finished her first season as the Maltese league's top goal scorer with 30 goals in 12 appearances.

In September 2024, Abera signed with DC Power FC ahead of the inaugural USL Super League season. In March 2026, she received her second USL Super League Team of the Month honor after registering one assist and two goals across five matches.

== Awards ==
Abera was included on the list of the BBC's list of 100 Women announced on 23 November 2020.
