= 2003 FIFA Women's World Cup squads =

International football squads

Below are the rosters for the 2003 FIFA Women's World Cup tournament in the United States. The 16 national teams involved in the tournament were required to register a squad of up to 20 players, including at least two goalkeepers. Only players in these squads were eligible to take part in the tournament. The final squads were published by FIFA on 13 September 2003.

== Group A ==
=== Nigeria ===
Head coach: Samuel Okpodu

No.	Pos.	Player	Date of birth (age)	Caps	Goals	Club
1	GK	Ugochi Opara	27 May 1976 (aged 27)			(Nigeria Football Federation) Pelican Stars
2	MF	Efioanwan Ekpo	25 January 1984 (aged 19)			(Chinese Football Association) Beijing Chengjian
3	DF	Bunmi Kayode	13 April 1985 (aged 18)			(Nigeria Football Federation) Inneh Queens
4	MF	Perpetua Nkwocha	3 January 1976 (aged 27)			(Chinese Football Association) Beijing Chengjian
5	DF	Onome Ebi	8 May 1983 (aged 20)			(Nigeria Football Federation) Omidiran Babes
6	DF	Florence Ajayi	28 April 1977 (aged 26)			(Nigeria Football Federation) Police Machine
7	MF	Stella Mbachu	16 April 1978 (aged 25)			(Nigeria Football Federation) Rivers Angels
8	FW	Olaitan Yusuf	12 January 1982 (aged 21)			(Nigeria Football Federation) Pelican Stars
9	MF	Faith Ikidi	28 February 1987 (aged 16)			(Nigeria Football Federation) Bayelsa Queens
10	FW	Mercy Akide	26 August 1975 (aged 28)			(United States Soccer Federation) Hampton Roads Piranhas
11	FW	Nkechi Egbe	5 February 1978 (aged 25)			(Nigeria Football Federation) Delta Queens
12	GK	Precious Dede	18 January 1980 (aged 23)			(Nigeria Football Federation) Delta Queens
13	MF	Nkiru Okosieme	1 March 1972 (aged 31)			(United States Soccer Federation) Charlotte Eagles
14	DF	Ifeanyi Chiejine	17 May 1983 (aged 20)			(Nigeria Football Federation) Pelican Stars
15	MF	Maureen Mmadu	7 May 1975 (aged 28)			(Norwegian Football Federation) Amazon Grimstad
16	DF	Florence Iweta	29 March 1983 (aged 20)			(Nigeria Football Federation) Delta Queens
17	DF	Florence Omagbemi (captain)	2 February 1975 (aged 28)			(United States Soccer Federation) Hampton Roads Piranhas
18	MF	Patience Avre	10 June 1976 (aged 27)			(United States Soccer Federation) Charlotte Eagles
19	GK	Esther Okhae	12 March 1986 (aged 17)			(Nigeria Football Federation) Sunshine Queens
20	FW	Vera Okolo	5 January 1985 (aged 18)			(Nigeria Football Federation) Delta Queens

=== North Korea ===
Head coach: Ri Song-gun

North Korea only named a squad of 19 players, leaving the number 4 shirt unassigned.

No.	Pos.	Player	Date of birth (age)	Caps	Goals	Club
1	GK	Ri Jong-hui (captain)	20 August 1975 (aged 28)			(DPR Korea Football Association) Pyongyang
2	DF	Yun In-sil	10 January 1976 (aged 27)			(DPR Korea Football Association) Amnokgang
3	DF	Kim Hwa-song	19 August 1985 (aged 18)			(DPR Korea Football Association) Sobaeksu
5	DF	Sin Kum-ok	25 November 1975 (aged 27)			(DPR Korea Football Association) Amnokgang
6	DF	Ra Mi-ae	8 December 1975 (aged 27)			(DPR Korea Football Association) Pyongyang
7	FW	Ri Kum-suk	16 August 1978 (aged 25)			(DPR Korea Football Association) Sobaeksu
8	FW	Pak Kum-chun	22 February 1978 (aged 25)			(DPR Korea Football Association) Amnokgang
9	MF	Ho Sun-hui	5 March 1980 (aged 23)			(DPR Korea Football Association) Amnokgang
10	FW	Jin Pyol-hui	19 August 1980 (aged 23)			(DPR Korea Football Association) Wolmido
11	MF	Yun Yong-hui	18 March 1977 (aged 26)			(DPR Korea Football Association) Rimyongsu
12	DF	Jang Ok-gyong	29 January 1980 (aged 23)			(DPR Korea Football Association) Amnokgang
13	DF	Song Jong-sun	11 March 1981 (aged 22)			(DPR Korea Football Association) Amnokgang
14	MF	O Kum-ran	18 September 1981 (aged 22)			(DPR Korea Football Association) Amnokgang
15	MF	Ri Un-gyong	19 November 1980 (aged 22)			(DPR Korea Football Association) Rimyongsu
16	FW	Pak Kyong-sun	23 June 1985 (aged 18)			(DPR Korea Football Association) Rimyongsu
17	DF	Jon Hye-yong	16 February 1977 (aged 26)			(DPR Korea Football Association) Amnokgang
18	GK	Chon Kyong-hwa	7 August 1983 (aged 20)			(DPR Korea Football Association) Rimyongsu
19	MF	Ri Hyang-ok	18 December 1977 (aged 25)			(DPR Korea Football Association) Rimyongsu
20	DF	Ri Un-ju	25 October 1983 (aged 19)			(DPR Korea Football Association) Pyongyang

=== Sweden ===
Head coach: Marika Domanski-Lyfors

No.	Pos.	Player	Date of birth (age)	Caps	Goals	Club
1	GK	Caroline Jönsson	22 November 1977 (aged 25)	44	0	(Swedish Football Association) Malmö FF
2	DF	Karolina Westberg	16 May 1978 (aged 25)	82	0	(Swedish Football Association) Malmö FF
3	DF	Jane Törnqvist	9 May 1975 (aged 28)	83	10	(Swedish Football Association) Djurgården/Älvsjö
4	DF	Hanna Marklund	26 November 1977 (aged 25)	62	3	(Swedish Football Association) Umeå IK
5	DF	Kristin Bengtsson	12 January 1970 (aged 33)	125	14	(Swedish Football Association) Kopparbergs/Landvetter
6	MF	Malin Moström (captain)	1 August 1975 (aged 28)	68	11	(Swedish Football Association) Umeå IK
7	DF	Sara Larsson	13 May 1979 (aged 24)	36	2	(Swedish Football Association) Malmö FF
8	MF	Frida Nordin	23 May 1982 (aged 21)	14	1	(Swedish Football Association) Malmö FF
9	MF	Malin Andersson	4 May 1973 (aged 30)	127	36	(Swedish Football Association) Malmö FF
10	FW	Hanna Ljungberg	8 January 1979 (aged 24)	90	51	(Swedish Football Association) Umeå IK
11	FW	Victoria Svensson	18 May 1977 (aged 26)	85	33	(Swedish Football Association) Djurgården/Älvsjö
12	GK	Sofia Lundgren	20 September 1982 (aged 21)	7	0	(Swedish Football Association) Umeå IK
13	MF	Sara Johansson	23 January 1980 (aged 23)	8	1	(Swedish Football Association) Djurgården/Älvsjö
14	MF	Linda Fagerström	17 March 1977 (aged 26)	72	7	(Swedish Football Association) Djurgården/Älvsjö
15	MF	Therese Sjögran	4 August 1977 (aged 26)	58	4	(Swedish Football Association) Malmö FF
16	FW	Salina Olsson	29 August 1978 (aged 25)	36	7	(Swedish Football Association) Hammarby
17	MF	Anna Sjöström	23 April 1977 (aged 26)	21	2	(Swedish Football Association) Umeå IK
18	DF	Frida Östberg	10 December 1977 (aged 25)	8	1	(Swedish Football Association) Umeå IK
19	DF	Sara Call	16 July 1977 (aged 26)	34	1	(Swedish Football Association) Bälinge IF
20	FW	Josefine Öqvist	23 July 1983 (aged 20)	5	1	(Swedish Football Association) Bälinge IF

=== United States ===
Head coach: April Heinrichs

No.	Pos.	Player	Date of birth (age)	Caps	Goals	Club
1	GK	Briana Scurry	7 September 1971 (aged 32)			(United States Soccer Federation) Atlanta Beat
2	DF	Kylie Bivens	24 October 1978 (aged 24)			(United States Soccer Federation) Atlanta Beat
3	DF	Christie Pearce	24 June 1975 (aged 28)			(United States Soccer Federation) New York Power
4	DF	Cat Reddick	10 February 1982 (aged 21)			(United States Soccer Federation) University of North Carolina
5	MF	Tiffany Roberts	5 May 1977 (aged 26)			(United States Soccer Federation) Carolina Courage
6	DF	Brandi Chastain	21 July 1968 (aged 35)			(United States Soccer Federation) San Jose CyberRays
7	MF	Shannon Boxx	29 June 1977 (aged 26)			(United States Soccer Federation) New York Power
8	FW	Shannon MacMillan	7 October 1974 (aged 28)			(United States Soccer Federation) San Diego Spirit
9	FW	Mia Hamm	17 March 1972 (aged 31)			(United States Soccer Federation) Washington Freedom
10	MF	Aly Wagner	10 August 1980 (aged 23)			(United States Soccer Federation) Boston Breakers
11	MF	Julie Foudy (captain)	23 January 1971 (aged 32)			(United States Soccer Federation) San Diego Spirit
12	FW	Cindy Parlow	8 May 1978 (aged 25)			(United States Soccer Federation) Atlanta Beat
13	MF	Kristine Lilly	22 July 1971 (aged 32)			(United States Soccer Federation) Boston Breakers
14	DF	Joy Fawcett	8 February 1968 (aged 35)			(United States Soccer Federation) San Diego Spirit
15	DF	Kate Sobrero	23 August 1976 (aged 27)			(United States Soccer Federation) Boston Breakers
16	FW	Tiffeny Milbrett	23 October 1972 (aged 30)			(United States Soccer Federation) New York Power
17	DF	Danielle Slaton	10 June 1980 (aged 23)			(United States Soccer Federation) Carolina Courage
18	GK	Siri Mullinix	22 May 1978 (aged 25)			(United States Soccer Federation) Washington Freedom
19	MF	Angela Hucles	5 July 1978 (aged 25)			(United States Soccer Federation) San Diego Spirit
20	FW	Abby Wambach	2 June 1980 (aged 23)			(United States Soccer Federation) Washington Freedom

== Group B ==
=== Brazil ===
Head coach: Paulo Gonçalves

No.	Pos.	Player	Date of birth (age)	Caps	Goals	Club
1	GK	Andréia	14 September 1977 (aged 26)			(Brazilian Football Confederation) Santa Isabel
2	DF	Simone	10 February 1981 (aged 22)			(Brazilian Football Confederation) Santos
3	DF	Juliana (captain)	3 October 1981 (aged 21)			(Brazilian Football Confederation) Corinthians
4	DF	Tânia	3 October 1974 (aged 28)			(Brazilian Football Confederation) Santa Isabel
5	MF	Renata Costa	8 July 1986 (aged 17)			Unattached
6	MF	Michele	10 June 1984 (aged 19)			(Brazilian Football Confederation) Palmeiras
7	FW	Formiga	3 March 1978 (aged 25)			(Brazilian Football Confederation) Santa Isabel
8	MF	Rafaela	23 May 1981 (aged 22)			(Brazilian Football Confederation) Grêmio Maringá
9	FW	Kelly	8 May 1985 (aged 18)			(Brazilian Football Confederation) CEPE-Caxias
10	FW	Marta	19 February 1986 (aged 17)			(Brazilian Football Confederation) Santa Cruz
11	FW	Cristiane	15 May 1985 (aged 18)			(Brazilian Football Confederation) Juventus
12	GK	Giselle	20 November 1983 (aged 19)			(Brazilian Football Confederation) Juventus
13	DF	Mônica	4 April 1978 (aged 25)			(Brazilian Football Confederation) Matonense
14	FW	Rosana	7 July 1982 (aged 21)			(Brazilian Football Confederation) Internacional
15	DF	Renata Diniz	1 November 1985 (aged 17)			(Brazilian Football Confederation) Juventus
16	FW	Maycon	30 April 1977 (aged 26)			(Brazilian Football Confederation) Grêmio
17	FW	Kátia	18 February 1977 (aged 26)			(United States Soccer Federation) San Jose CyberRays
18	FW	Daniela	12 January 1984 (aged 19)			(United States Soccer Federation) San Diego Spirit
19	MF	Priscila	10 March 1982 (aged 21)			(Brazilian Football Confederation) Portuguesa
20	MF	Milene	18 June 1979 (aged 24)			(Royal Spanish Football Federation) Rayo Vallecano

=== France ===
Head coach: Élisabeth Loisel

No.	Pos.	Player	Date of birth (age)	Caps	Goals	Club
1	GK	Céline Marty	30 March 1976 (aged 27)			(French Football Federation) Toulouse
2	DF	Sabrina Viguier	4 January 1981 (aged 22)			(French Football Federation) Toulouse
3	DF	Peggy Provost	19 September 1977 (aged 26)			(French Football Federation) Juvisy
4	DF	Laura Georges	20 August 1984 (aged 19)			(French Football Federation) Paris Saint-Germain
5	DF	Corinne Diacre (captain)	4 August 1974 (aged 29)			(French Football Federation) Soyaux
6	MF	Sandrine Soubeyrand	16 August 1973 (aged 30)			(French Football Federation) Juvisy
7	FW	Stéphanie Mugneret-Béghé	22 March 1974 (aged 29)			(United States Soccer Federation) Boston Breakers
8	MF	Sonia Bompastor	8 June 1980 (aged 23)			(French Football Federation) Montpellier
9	FW	Marinette Pichon	26 November 1975 (aged 27)			(United States Soccer Federation) Philadelphia Charge
10	MF	Élodie Woock	13 January 1976 (aged 27)			(French Football Federation) Toulouse
11	MF	Amélie Coquet	31 December 1984 (aged 18)			(French Football Federation) Hénin-Beaumont
12	MF	Séverine Lecouflé	31 March 1975 (aged 28)			(French Football Federation) Saint-Brieuc
13	DF	Anne-Laure Casseleux	13 January 1984 (aged 19)			(French Football Federation) Soyaux
14	MF	Virginie Dessalle	3 July 1981 (aged 22)			(French Football Federation) Lyon
15	FW	Laëtitia Tonazzi	31 January 1981 (aged 22)			(French Football Federation) Juvisy
16	GK	Bérangère Sapowicz	6 February 1983 (aged 20)			(French Football Federation) Paris Saint-Germain
17	FW	Marie-Ange Kramo	20 February 1979 (aged 24)			(French Football Federation) Toulouse
18	FW	Hoda Lattaf	31 August 1978 (aged 25)			(French Football Federation) Montpellier
19	DF	Severine Goulois	18 April 1982 (aged 21)			(French Football Federation) Hénin-Beaumont
20	DF	Emmanuelle Sykora	21 February 1976 (aged 27)			(French Football Federation) Lyon

=== Norway ===
Head coach: Åge Steen

No.	Pos.	Player	Date of birth (age)	Caps	Goals	Club
1	GK	Bente Nordby	23 July 1974 (aged 29)	119		(Norwegian Football Federation) Kolbotn
2	DF	Brit Sandaune	5 June 1972 (aged 31)	115		(Norwegian Football Federation) Trondheims-Ørn
3	DF	Ane Stangeland	2 June 1980 (aged 23)	27		(Norwegian Football Federation) Klepp
4	DF	Monica Knudsen	25 March 1975 (aged 28)	81		(Norwegian Football Federation) Asker
5	MF	Karin Bredland	7 January 1978 (aged 25)	1		(Norwegian Football Federation) Røa
6	MF	Hege Riise	18 July 1969 (aged 34)	177		(United States Soccer Federation) Carolina Courage
7	FW	Trine Rønning	14 June 1982 (aged 21)	30		(Norwegian Football Federation) Kolbotn
8	MF	Solveig Gulbrandsen	12 January 1981 (aged 22)	67		(Norwegian Football Federation) Kolbotn
9	FW	Anita Rapp	24 July 1976 (aged 27)	58		(Norwegian Football Federation) Asker
10	MF	Unni Lehn	7 June 1977 (aged 26)	88		(United States Soccer Federation) Carolina Courage
11	FW	Marianne Pettersen	12 April 1975 (aged 28)	93		(Norwegian Football Federation) Asker
12	GK	Silje Vesterbekkmo	22 June 1983 (aged 20)			(Norwegian Football Federation) Røa
13	DF	Anne Tønnessen	18 March 1974 (aged 29)	59		(Norwegian Football Federation) Klepp
14	FW	Dagny Mellgren (captain)	19 June 1978 (aged 25)	71		(United States Soccer Federation) Boston Breakers
15	DF	Marit Fiane Christensen	11 December 1980 (aged 22)	6		(Norwegian Football Federation) Asker
16	DF	Gunhild Følstad	3 November 1981 (aged 21)	3		(Norwegian Football Federation) Trondheims-Ørn
17	FW	Linda Ørmen	22 March 1977 (aged 26)	46		(Norwegian Football Federation) Asker
18	FW	Ingrid Camilla Fosse Sæthre	19 January 1978 (aged 25)	15		(Norwegian Football Federation) Arna-Bjørnar
19	MF	Kristine Edner	8 March 1976 (aged 27)	10		(Norwegian Football Federation) Røa
20	MF	Lise Klaveness	19 April 1981 (aged 22)	10		(Norwegian Football Federation) Asker

=== South Korea ===
Head coach: An Jong-goan

No.	Pos.	Player	Date of birth (age)	Caps	Goals	Club
1	GK	Jung Ho-jung	11 May 1976 (aged 27)			(Korea Football Association) INI Steel
2	MF	Kim Ju-hee	10 March 1985 (aged 18)			(Korea Football Association) Wirye Information Industry HS
3	MF	Hong Kyung-suk	14 October 1984 (aged 18)			(Korea Football Association) Yeojoo Institute of Technology
4	DF	Kim Yu-jin	17 July 1979 (aged 24)			(Korea Football Association) INI Steel
5	DF	Park Hae-jung	10 March 1977 (aged 26)			(Korea Football Association) INI Steel
6	DF	Jin Suk-hee	9 July 1978 (aged 25)			(Korea Football Association) INI Steel
7	FW	Park Eun-sun	25 December 1986 (aged 16)			(Korea Football Association) Wirye Information Industry HS
8	MF	Hwang In-sun	2 February 1976 (aged 27)			(Korea Football Association) INI Steel
9	MF	Song Ju-hee	30 October 1977 (aged 25)			(Korea Football Association) INI Steel
10	MF	Kim Jin-hee	26 March 1981 (aged 22)			(Korea Football Association) Ulsan College
11	FW	Lee Ji-eun	16 December 1979 (aged 23)			(Korea Football Association) INI Steel
12	GK	Kim Jung-mi	16 October 1984 (aged 18)			(Korea Football Association) Yeungjin College
13	MF	Kim Yoo-jin	26 September 1981 (aged 21)			(Korea Football Association) INI Steel
14	MF	Han Jin-sook	15 December 1979 (aged 23)			(Korea Football Association) Daekyo Kangaroos
15	MF	Kim Kyul-sil	13 April 1982 (aged 21)			(Korea Football Association) Yeojoo Institute of Technology
16	MF	Shin Sun-nam	30 May 1981 (aged 22)			(Korea Football Association) INI Steel
17	FW	Sung Hyun-ah	5 May 1982 (aged 21)			(Korea Football Association) Daekyo Kangaroos
18	DF	Kim Yu-mi	15 August 1979 (aged 24)			(Korea Football Association) INI Steel
19	MF	Lee Myung-hwa	29 July 1973 (aged 30)			(Korea Football Association) INI Steel
20	DF	Yoo Young-sil (captain)	1 May 1975 (aged 28)			(Korea Football Association) INI Steel

== Group C ==
=== Argentina ===
Head coach: Carlos Borrello

No.	Pos.	Player	Date of birth (age)	Caps	Goals	Club
1	GK	Romina Ferro	26 June 1980 (aged 23)			(Argentine Football Association) River Plate
2	DF	Clarisa Huber	22 December 1984 (aged 18)			Unattached
3	DF	Mariela Ricotti	2 April 1979 (aged 24)			(Argentine Football Association) Boca Juniors
4	DF	Andrea Gonsebate	7 May 1977 (aged 26)			Unattached
5	MF	Marisa Gerez (captain)	3 November 1976 (aged 26)			(Argentine Football Association) Boca Juniors
6	DF	Noelia López	29 July 1978 (aged 25)			(Argentine Football Association) River Plate
7	FW	Karina Alvariza	11 April 1976 (aged 27)			(Argentine Football Association) Boca Juniors
8	MF	Natalia Gatti	20 October 1982 (aged 20)			Unattached
9	DF	Yesica Arrien	1 July 1980 (aged 23)			(Argentine Football Association) Gimnasia y Esgrima
10	MF	Rosana Gómez	13 July 1980 (aged 23)			(Argentine Football Association) Boca Juniors
11	FW	Marisol Medina	11 May 1980 (aged 23)			Unattached
12	GK	Vanina Correa	14 August 1983 (aged 20)			(Argentine Football Association) Banfield
13	DF	Nancy Díaz	14 March 1973 (aged 30)			(Argentine Football Association) Boca Juniors
14	FW	Fabiana Vallejos	30 June 1985 (aged 18)			(Argentine Football Association) River Plate
15	MF	Yanina Gaitán	3 June 1978 (aged 25)			(Argentine Football Association) Boca Juniors
16	DF	Adela Medina	3 November 1978 (aged 24)			Unattached
17	DF	Valeria Cotelo	26 March 1984 (aged 19)			Unattached
18	FW	Mariela Coronel	20 June 1981 (aged 22)			(Argentine Football Association) Independiente
19	DF	Celeste Barbitta	22 May 1979 (aged 24)			Unattached
20	FW	Elizabeth Villanueva	29 October 1974 (aged 28)			(Argentine Football Association) Boca Juniors

=== Canada ===
Head coach: (Norway) Even Pellerud

No.	Pos.	Player	Date of birth (age)	Caps	Goals	Club
1	GK	Karina LeBlanc	30 March 1980 (aged 23)	39	0	(United States Soccer Federation) Boston Breakers
2	FW	Christine Latham	15 September 1981 (aged 22)	32	9	(United States Soccer Federation) San Diego Spirit
3	DF	Linda Consolante	23 May 1982 (aged 21)	3	0	(United States Soccer Federation) Maine Black Bears
4	DF	Sasha Andrews	24 February 1983 (aged 20)	22	2	(United States Soccer Federation) SMU Mustangs
5	MF	Andrea Neil	26 October 1971 (aged 31)	84	18	(Canadian Soccer Association) Vancouver Whitecaps
6	DF	Sharolta Nonen	30 December 1977 (aged 25)	45	1	(United States Soccer Federation) Atlanta Beat
7	DF	Isabelle Morneau	18 April 1976 (aged 27)	58	6	(Canadian Soccer Association) Ottawa Fury
8	MF	Kristina Kiss	13 February 1981 (aged 22)	48	8	(Norwegian Football Federation) IF Fløya
9	MF	Rhian Wilkinson	12 May 1982 (aged 21)	6	3	(Canadian Soccer Association) Ottawa Fury
10	FW	Charmaine Hooper (captain)	15 January 1968 (aged 35)	99	58	(United States Soccer Federation) Atlanta Beat
11	DF	Randee Hermus	14 November 1979 (aged 23)	50	4	(Norwegian Football Federation) IF Fløya
12	FW	Christine Sinclair	12 June 1983 (aged 20)	51	40	(United States Soccer Federation) Portland Pilots
13	MF	Diana Matheson	16 April 1984 (aged 19)	13	1	(Canadian Soccer Association) Toronto Inferno
14	MF	Carmelina Moscato	2 May 1984 (aged 19)	14	1	(United States Soccer Federation) Penn State
15	MF	Kara Lang	22 October 1986 (aged 16)	30	19	(Canadian Soccer Association) Vancouver Whitecaps
16	MF	Brittany Timko	5 September 1985 (aged 18)	22	0	(United States Soccer Federation) Nebraska Cornhuskers
17	FW	Silvana Burtini	10 May 1969 (aged 34)	73	38	Unattached
18	FW	Tanya Dennis	26 August 1985 (aged 18)	3	0	(United States Soccer Federation) Nebraska Cornhuskers
19	GK	Erin McLeod	26 February 1983 (aged 20)	12	0	Unattached
20	GK	Taryn Swiatek	4 February 1981 (aged 22)	6	0	(Canadian Soccer Association) Ottawa Fury

=== Germany ===
Head coach: Tina Theune-Meyer

No.	Pos.	Player	Date of birth (age)	Caps	Goals	Club
1	GK	Silke Rottenberg	25 January 1972 (aged 31)	5		(German Football Association) FCR 2001 Duisburg
2	DF	Kerstin Stegemann	29 September 1977 (aged 25)	42		(German Football Association) FFC Heike Rheine
3	DF	Linda Bresonik	7 December 1983 (aged 19)	26		(German Football Association) FCR 2001 Duisburg
4	DF	Nia Künzer	18 January 1980 (aged 23)	81		(German Football Association) 1. FFC Frankfurt
5	MF	Steffi Jones	22 December 1972 (aged 30)	38		(German Football Association) 1. FFC Frankfurt
6	MF	Renate Lingor	11 October 1975 (aged 27)	14		(German Football Association) 1. FFC Frankfurt
7	MF	Pia Wunderlich	26 January 1975 (aged 28)	28		(German Football Association) 1. FFC Frankfurt
8	MF	Sandra Smisek	3 July 1977 (aged 26)	18		(German Football Association) FSV Frankfurt
9	FW	Birgit Prinz	25 October 1977 (aged 25)	43		(German Football Association) 1. FFC Frankfurt
10	MF	Bettina Wiegmann (captain)	7 October 1971 (aged 31)	44		(German Football Association) FFC Brauweiler Pulheim
11	FW	Martina Müller	18 April 1980 (aged 23)	26		(German Football Association) SC 07 Bad Neuenahr
12	DF	Sonja Fuss	5 November 1978 (aged 24)	45		(German Football Association) FFC Brauweiler Pulheim
13	DF	Sandra Minnert	7 April 1973 (aged 30)	42		(German Football Association) 1. FFC Frankfurt
14	FW	Maren Meinert	5 August 1973 (aged 30)	40		(United States Soccer Federation) Boston Breakers
15	GK	Nadine Angerer	10 November 1978 (aged 24)	25		(German Football Association) 1. FFC Turbine Potsdam
16	MF	Viola Odebrecht	11 February 1983 (aged 20)	48		(German Football Association) 1. FFC Turbine Potsdam
17	DF	Ariane Hingst	25 July 1979 (aged 24)	46		(German Football Association) 1. FFC Turbine Potsdam
18	MF	Kerstin Garefrekes	4 September 1979 (aged 24)	17		(German Football Association) FFC Heike Rheine
19	DF	Stefanie Gottschlich	5 August 1978 (aged 25)	46		(German Football Association) VfL Wolfsburg
20	FW	Conny Pohlers	16 November 1978 (aged 24)	17		(German Football Association) 1. FFC Turbine Potsdam

=== Japan ===
Head coach: Eiji Ueda

No.	Pos.	Player	Date of birth (age)	Caps	Goals	Club
1	GK	Nozomi Yamago	16 January 1975 (aged 28)			(Japan Football Association) Urawa Reds
2	DF	Yumi Obe (captain)	15 February 1975 (aged 28)			(Japan Football Association) TEPCO Mareeze
3	DF	Hiromi Isozaki	22 December 1975 (aged 27)			(Japan Football Association) Tasaki Perule
4	DF	Yasuyo Yamagishi	28 November 1979 (aged 23)			(Japan Football Association) Kunoichi
5	MF	Tomoe Sakai	27 May 1978 (aged 25)			(Japan Football Association) NTV Beleza
6	MF	Yayoi Kobayashi	18 September 1981 (aged 22)			(Japan Football Association) NTV Beleza
7	MF	Naoko Kawakami	16 November 1977 (aged 25)			(Japan Football Association) Tasaki Perule
8	MF	Tomomi Miyamoto	31 December 1978 (aged 24)			(Japan Football Association) Kunoichi
9	FW	Eriko Arakawa	30 October 1979 (aged 23)			(Japan Football Association) NTV Beleza
10	FW	Homare Sawa	6 September 1978 (aged 25)			(United States Soccer Federation) Atlanta Beat
11	FW	Mio Otani	5 May 1979 (aged 24)			(Japan Football Association) Tasaki Perule
12	GK	Shiho Onodera	18 November 1973 (aged 29)			(Japan Football Association) NTV Beleza
13	MF	Mai Nakachi	16 December 1980 (aged 22)			(Japan Football Association) NTV Beleza
14	DF	Kyoko Yano	3 June 1984 (aged 19)			(Japan Football Association) Kanagawa University
15	DF	Yuka Miyazaki	13 October 1983 (aged 19)			(Japan Football Association) Kunoichi
16	MF	Emi Yamamoto	9 March 1982 (aged 21)			(Japan Football Association) Tasaki Perule
17	MF	Miyuki Yanagita	11 April 1981 (aged 22)			(Japan Football Association) Tasaki Perule
18	FW	Karina Maruyama	26 March 1983 (aged 20)			(Japan Football Association) Nippon Sport Science University
19	FW	Akiko Sudo	7 April 1984 (aged 19)			(Japan Football Association) NTV Beleza
20	MF	Aya Miyama	28 January 1985 (aged 18)			(Japan Football Association) Okayama Yunogo Belle

== Group D ==
=== Australia ===
Head coach: Adrian Santrac

No.	Pos.	Player	Date of birth (age)	Caps	Goals	Club
1	GK	Cassandra Kell	8 August 1980 (aged 23)			(Football Australia) NSW Sapphires
2	MF	Gillian Foster	28 August 1976 (aged 27)			(Football Australia) Canberra Eclipse
3	DF	Sacha Wainwright	6 February 1972 (aged 31)			(Football Australia) Canberra Eclipse
4	DF	Dianne Alagich	12 May 1979 (aged 24)			(United States Soccer Federation) San Jose CyberRays
5	DF	Cheryl Salisbury (captain)	8 March 1974 (aged 29)			(United States Soccer Federation) New York Power
6	DF	Rhian Davies	5 January 1981 (aged 22)			(Football Australia) Canberra Eclipse
7	FW	Kelly Golebiowski	26 July 1981 (aged 22)			(United States Soccer Federation) Washington Freedom
8	MF	Bryony Duus	7 October 1977 (aged 25)			(Football Australia) Queensland Sting
9	FW	April Mann	21 April 1978 (aged 25)			(Football Australia) Queensland Sting
10	MF	Joanne Peters	11 March 1979 (aged 24)			(United States Soccer Federation) New York Power
11	MF	Heather Garriock	21 December 1982 (aged 20)			(Football Australia) Queensland Sting
12	GK	Melissa Barbieri	20 January 1980 (aged 23)			(Football Australia) Victoria Vision
13	DF	Karla Reuter	14 June 1984 (aged 19)			(Football Australia) Queensland Sting
14	DF	Pamela Grant	15 November 1982 (aged 20)			(Football Australia) Queensland Sting
15	MF	Tal Karp	30 December 1981 (aged 21)			(Football Australia) Canberra Eclipse
16	MF	Taryn Rockall	11 November 1977 (aged 25)			(Football Australia) NSW Sapphires
17	FW	Danielle Small	7 February 1979 (aged 24)			(Football Australia) Northern NSW Pride
18	GK	Amy Beattie	8 September 1980 (aged 23)			(Football Australia) Canberra Eclipse
19	FW	Amy Wilson	9 June 1980 (aged 23)			(Football Australia) Canberra Eclipse
20	FW	Hayley Crawford	27 March 1984 (aged 19)			(Football Australia) Northern NSW Pride

=== China PR ===
Head coach: Ma Liangxing

No.	Pos.	Player	Date of birth (age)	Caps	Goals	Club
1	GK	Han Wenxia	23 August 1976 (aged 27)			(Chinese Football Association) Dalian
2	DF	Sun Rui	30 March 1978 (aged 25)			(Chinese Football Association) Shanghai SVA
3	DF	Li Jie	8 July 1979 (aged 24)			(Chinese Football Association) Beijing Chengjian
4	DF	Gao Hongxia	7 December 1973 (aged 29)			(Chinese Football Association) Shanghai SVA
5	DF	Fan Yunjie	29 April 1972 (aged 31)			(Chinese Football Association) Henan
6	MF	Zhao Lihong	25 December 1972 (aged 30)			(Chinese Football Association) Guangdong
7	FW	Bai Jie	28 March 1972 (aged 31)			(United States Soccer Federation) Washington Freedom
8	MF	Zhang Ouying	2 November 1975 (aged 27)			(United States Soccer Federation) San Diego Spirit
9	FW	Sun Wen (captain)	6 April 1973 (aged 30)			(Chinese Football Association) Shanghai SVA
10	MF	Liu Ying	11 June 1974 (aged 29)			(Chinese Football Association) Beijing Chengjian
11	DF	Pu Wei	20 August 1980 (aged 23)			(Chinese Football Association) Beijing Chengfeng F.C.
12	MF	Qu Feifei	18 May 1982 (aged 21)			(Chinese Football Association) Bayi
13	FW	Teng Wei	21 May 1974 (aged 29)			(Chinese Football Association) Beijing Chengjian
14	MF	Bi Yan	17 February 1984 (aged 19)			(Chinese Football Association) Dalian
15	MF	Ren Liping	21 October 1978 (aged 24)			(Chinese Football Association) Beijing Chengjian
16	DF	Liu Yali	9 February 1980 (aged 23)			(Chinese Football Association) Hebei
17	MF	Pan Lina	18 July 1977 (aged 26)			(Chinese Football Association) Shanghai SVA
18	GK	Zhao Yan	7 May 1972 (aged 31)			(Chinese Football Association) Beijing Chengfeng F.C.
19	FW	Han Duan	15 June 1983 (aged 20)			(Chinese Football Association) Dalian
20	DF	Wang Liping	12 November 1973 (aged 29)			(Chinese Football Association) Hebei

=== Ghana ===
Head coach: Oko Aryee

No.	Pos.	Player	Date of birth (age)	Caps	Goals	Club
1	GK	Memunatu Sulemana	4 November 1977 (aged 25)			(Ghana Football Association) Post Ladies
2	DF	Aminatu Ibrahim	3 January 1979 (aged 24)			(Ghana Football Association) Ghatel Ladies
3	DF	Mavis Danso	24 March 1984 (aged 19)			(Ghana Football Association) Ghatel Ladies
4	DF	Patience Sackey	22 April 1975 (aged 28)			(Ghana Football Association) Post Ladies
5	MF	Patricia Ofori	9 June 1981 (aged 22)			(Ghana Football Association) Mawuena Ladies
6	MF	Florence Okoe	12 November 1984 (aged 18)			(Ghana Football Association) La Ladies
7	MF	Genevive Clottey	25 April 1969 (aged 34)			(Ghana Football Association) Ghatel Ladies
8	FW	Myralyn Osei Agyemang	5 November 1981 (aged 21)			(United States Soccer Federation) Portland Rain
9	FW	Akua Anokyewaa	15 October 1984 (aged 18)			(Ghana Football Association) Ashtown Ladies
10	FW	Adjoa Bayor	17 May 1979 (aged 24)			(United States Soccer Federation) Robert Morris College
11	FW	Gloria Foriwa	11 May 1981 (aged 22)			(Ghana Football Association) Ghatel Ladies
12	GK	Fati Mohammed	4 June 1979 (aged 24)			(Ghana Football Association) Post Ladies
13	DF	Yaa Avoe	1 July 1982 (aged 21)			(Ghana Football Association) Ashtown Ladies
14	DF	Elizabeth Baidu	28 April 1978 (aged 25)			(United States Soccer Federation) Robert Morris College
15	FW	Alberta Sackey (captain)	6 November 1972 (aged 30)			(United States Soccer Federation) Robert Morris College
16	DF	Lydia Ankrah	1 December 1973 (aged 29)			(Ghana Football Association) Post Ladies
17	MF	Belinda Kanda	3 November 1982 (aged 20)			(Ghana Football Association) Mawuena Ladies
18	FW	Mavis Dgajmah	21 December 1973 (aged 29)			(Ghana Football Association) La Ladies
19	FW	Basilea Amoa-Tetteh	7 March 1984 (aged 19)			(United States Soccer Federation) Robert Morris College
20	GK	Gladys Enti	21 April 1975 (aged 28)			(Ghana Football Association) Ghatel Ladies

=== Russia ===
Head coach: Yuri Bystritsky

No.	Pos.	Player	Date of birth (age)	Caps	Goals	Club
1	GK	Svetlana Petko	6 June 1970 (aged 33)			(Russian Football Union) Samara
2	DF	Tatiana Zaitseva	27 August 1978 (aged 25)			(Russian Football Union) Voronezh
3	DF	Marina Burakova (captain)	8 May 1966 (aged 37)			(Russian Football Union) Nadezhda Noginsk
4	DF	Marina Saenko	1 May 1975 (aged 28)			(Russian Football Union) Voronezh
5	DF	Vera Stroukova	6 August 1981 (aged 22)			(Russian Football Union) Voronezh
6	MF	Galina Komarova	12 August 1977 (aged 26)			(Russian Football Union) Samara
7	MF	Tatiana Egorova	10 March 1970 (aged 33)			(Russian Football Union) Samara
8	MF	Alexandra Svetlitskaya	20 August 1971 (aged 32)			(Russian Football Union) Samara
9	MF	Olga Sergaeva	8 March 1977 (aged 26)			(Russian Football Union) Ryazan
10	FW	Natalia Barbashina	26 August 1973 (aged 30)			(Russian Football Union) Lada Togliatti
11	FW	Olga Letyushova	29 December 1975 (aged 27)			(Russian Football Union) Ryazan
12	GK	Alla Volkova	12 April 1968 (aged 35)			(Russian Football Union) Lada Togliatti
13	MF	Elena Fomina	5 April 1979 (aged 24)			(Russian Football Union) Samara
14	MF	Oksana Shmachkova	20 June 1981 (aged 22)			(Russian Football Union) Voronezh
15	MF	Tatyana Skotnikova	27 November 1978 (aged 24)			(Russian Football Union) Voronezh
16	DF	Marina Kolomiets	29 September 1972 (aged 30)			(Russian Football Union) Lada Togliatti
17	FW	Elena Danilova	17 June 1987 (aged 16)			(Russian Football Union) Voronezh
18	DF	Anastasia Pustovoitova	10 February 1981 (aged 22)			(Russian Football Union) Ryazan
19	MF	Elena Denchtchik	11 November 1973 (aged 29)			(Russian Football Union) Samara
20	GK	Maria Pigaleva	19 February 1981 (aged 22)			(Russian Football Union) Nadezhda Noginsk
