= 2003 FIFA Women's World Cup Group A =

Football tournament group stage

Group A of the 2003 FIFA Women's World Cup was one of four groups of nations, consisting of Nigeria, North Korea, Sweden and the United States. It began on September 20 and ended on September 28. Defending champions and host United States topped the group with a 100% record, joined in the second round by Sweden, who overcame their defeat in the first game to qualify for the knockout stage.

Three of these teams had also been also drawn together in Group A of the previous World Cup in 1999 (the exception was Sweden, whose place was taken by fellow Scandinavians Denmark). The four teams were then drawn together in Group B at the 2007 World Cup.

== Standings ==
Pos	Team	Pld	W	D	L	GF	GA	GD	Pts	Qualification
1	United States (H)	3	3	0	0	11	1	+10	9	Advance to knockout stage
2	Sweden	3	2	0	1	5	3	+2	6	Advance to knockout stage
3	North Korea	3	1	0	2	3	4	−1	3	
4	Nigeria	3	0	0	3	0	11	−11	0	

Source: FIFA
Rules for classification: Group stage tiebreakers
(H) Hosts

== Matches ==
All times local (EDT/UTC–4)

=== Nigeria vs North Korea ===
September 20, 2003
14:45

Nigeria	0–3	North Korea
	Report	Jin Pyol-hui 13', 88'; Ri Un-gyong 73'

Lincoln Financial Field, Philadelphia
Attendance: 24,347
Referee: Nicole Petignat (Switzerland)

GK	12	Precious Dede
DF	3	Bunmi Kayode
DF	6	Kikelomo Ajayi	(yellow card) 28'
DF	17	Florence Omagbemi (c)		(substituted off) 44'
DF	14	Ifeanyichukwu Chiejine		(substituted off) 85'
DF	16	Florence Iweta
MF	2	Efioanwan Ekpo
MF	4	Perpetua Nkwocha
MF	7	Stella Mbachu
FW	10	Mercy Akide	(yellow card) 22'
FW	11	Nkechi Egbe		(substituted off) 46'
Substitutions:
MF	15	Maureen Mmadu		(substituted in) 44'
MF	18	Patience Avre		(substituted in) 46'
DF	5	Onome Ebi		(substituted in) 85'
Manager:
Samuel Okpodu

GK	1	Ri Jong-hui (c)
DF	2	Yun In-sil
DF	5	Sin Kum-ok
DF	12	Jang Ok-gyong
DF	17	Jon Hye-yong	(yellow card) 71'
MF	11	Yun Yong-hui		(substituted off) 57'
MF	14	O Kum-ran
MF	15	Ri Un-gyong
MF	19	Ri Hyang Ok	(yellow card) 25'
FW	7	Ri Kum Suk		(substituted off) 81'
FW	10	Jin Pyol Hui
Substitutions:
FW	16	Pak Kyong Sun		(substituted in) 57'
MF	9	Ho Sun Hui		(substituted in) 81'
Manager:
Song Gun Ri

Player of the Match:
Jin Pyol Hui (North Korea)

Assistant referees:
Elke Lüthi (Switzerland)
Nelly Viennot (France)
Fourth official:
Tammy Ogston (Australia)

=== United States vs Sweden ===
September 21, 2003
12:30

United States	3–1	Sweden
Lilly 27'; Parlow 36'; Boxx 78'	Report	Svensson 58'

Robert F. Kennedy Memorial Stadium, Washington, D.C.
Attendance: 34,144
Referee: Zhang Dongqing (China PR)

GK	1	Briana Scurry	(yellow card) 13'
DF	3	Christie Rampone
DF	14	Joy Fawcett
DF	6	Brandi Chastain		(substituted off) 46'
DF	15	Kate Markgraf
MF	13	Kristine Lilly
MF	7	Shannon Boxx
MF	11	Julie Foudy (c)
FW	12	Cindy Parlow		(substituted off) 70'
FW	9	Mia Hamm
FW	20	Abby Wambach		(substituted off) 56'
Substitutions:
DF	4	Cat Whitehill		(substituted in) 46'
FW	16	Tiffeny Milbrett		(substituted in) 56'
MF	10	Aly Wagner	(yellow card) 72'	(substituted in) 70'
Manager:
April Heinrichs

GK	1	Caroline Jönsson
DF	4	Hanna Marklund
DF	2	Karolina Westberg
DF	3	Jane Törnqvist
DF	7	Sara Larsson
MF	9	Malin Andersson (c)		(substituted off) 77'
MF	15	Therese Sjögran		(substituted off) 46'
MF	6	Malin Moström
MF	14	Linda Fagerström
FW	10	Hanna Ljungberg		(substituted off) 83'
FW	11	Victoria Svensson
Substitutes:
DF	18	Frida Östberg		(substituted in) 46'
MF	17	Anna Sjöström	(yellow card) 90+3'	(substituted in) 77'
FW	20	Josefine Öqvist		(substituted in) 83'
Manager:
Marika Domanski-Lyfors

Player of the Match:
Kristine Lilly (United States)

Assistant referees:
Liu Hsiu-mei (Chinese Taipei)
Hisae Yoshizawa (Japan)
Fourth official:
Xonam Agboyi (Togo)

=== Sweden vs North Korea ===
September 25, 2003
16:45

Sweden	1–0	North Korea
Svensson 7'	Report

Lincoln Financial Field, Philadelphia
Attendance: 31,553
Referee: Tammy Ogston (Australia)

GK	1	Caroline Jönsson
DF	4	Hanna Marklund
DF	2	Karolina Westberg	(yellow card) 52'
DF	3	Jane Törnqvist
DF	7	Sara Larsson
DF	18	Frida Östberg
MF	9	Malin Andersson		(substituted off) 65'
MF	6	Malin Moström (c)
MF	14	Linda Fagerström		(substituted off) 56'
FW	10	Hanna Ljungberg		(substituted off) 86'
FW	11	Victoria Svensson
Substitutes:
MF	17	Anna Sjöström		(substituted in) 56'
DF	5	Kristin Bengtsson		(substituted in) 65'
FW	20	Josefine Öqvist		(substituted in) 86'
Manager:
Marika Domanski-Lyfors

GK	1	Ri Jong-hui (c)
DF	6	Ra Mi Ae		(substituted off) 62'
DF	5	Sin Kum Ok		(substituted off) 55'
DF	12	Jang Ok Gyong	(yellow card) 56'
DF	17	Jon Hye Yong
MF	11	Yun Yong Hui		(substituted off) 36'
MF	14	O Kum Ran
MF	15	Ri Un Gyong
MF	19	Ri Hyang Ok
FW	7	Ri Kum Suk
FW	10	Jin Pyol Hui
Substitutions:
MF	9	Ho Sun Hui		(substituted in) 36'
DF	2	Yun In Sil		(substituted in) 55'
DF	13	Song Jong Sun		(substituted in) 62'
Manager:
Song Gun Ri

Player of the Match:
Victoria Svensson (Sweden)

Assistant referees:
Airlie Keen (Australia)
Jacqueline Leleu (Australia)
Fourth official:
Im Eun-Ju (South Korea)

=== United States vs Nigeria ===
September 25, 2003
19:30

United States	5–0	Nigeria
Hamm 6' (pen.), 12'; Parlow 47'; Wambach 65'; Foudy 89' (pen.)	Report

Lincoln Financial Field, Philadelphia
Attendance: 31,553
Referee: Florencia Romano (Argentina)

GK	1	Briana Scurry
DF	2	Kylie Bivens
DF	14	Joy Fawcett
DF	4	Cat Whitehill
DF	15	Kate Markgraf
MF	13	Kristine Lilly
MF	7	Shannon Boxx	(substituted off) 71'
MF	11	Julie Foudy (c)
MF	10	Aly Wagner	(substituted off) 46'
FW	12	Cindy Parlow	(substituted off) 57'
FW	9	Mia Hamm
Substitutions:
FW	20	Abby Wambach	(substituted in) 46'
FW	16	Tiffeny Milbrett	(substituted in) 57'
MF	5	Tiffany Roberts	(substituted in) 71'
Manager:
April Heinrichs

GK	12	Precious Dede
DF	3	Bunmi Kayode
DF	6	Kikelomo Ajayi
DF	17	Florence Omagbemi (c)	(yellow card) 76'
DF	14	Ifeanyichukwu Chiejine
MF	18	Patience Avre
MF	15	Maureen Mmadu
MF	13	Nkiru Okosieme
MF	7	Stella Mbachu
MF	4	Perpetua Nkwocha
FW	10	Mercy Akide
Manager:
Samuel Okpodu

Player of the Match:
Mia Hamm (United States)

Assistant referees:
Sabrina Lois (Argentina)
Alejandra Cercato (Argentina)
Fourth official:
Im Eun-Ju (South Korea)

=== Sweden vs Nigeria ===
September 28, 2003
13:00

Sweden	3–0	Nigeria
Ljungberg 56', 79'; Moström 81'	Report

Columbus Crew Stadium, Columbus
Attendance: 22,828
Referee: Sonia Denoncourt (Canada)

GK	1	Caroline Jönsson
DF	4	Hanna Marklund
DF	2	Karolina Westberg
DF	5	Kristin Bengtsson	(substituted off) 46'
DF	19	Sara Call
DF	7	Sara Larsson
DF	18	Frida Östberg
MF	9	Malin Andersson (c)	(substituted off) 66'
MF	6	Malin Moström
FW	10	Hanna Ljungberg
FW	11	Victoria Svensson	(substituted off) 85'
Substitutes:
MF	17	Anna Sjöström	(substituted in) 46'
MF	15	Therese Sjögran	(substituted in) 66'
FW	20	Josefine Öqvist	(substituted in) 85'
Manager:
Marika Domanski-Lyfors

GK	12	Precious Dede
DF	6	Kikelomo Ajayi
DF	16	Florence Iweta	(substituted off) 83'
DF	17	Florence Omagbemi (c)
DF	14	Ifeanyichukwu Chiejine
MF	18	Patience Avre	(substituted off) 89'
MF	15	Maureen Mmadu
MF	13	Nkiru Okosieme	(substituted off) 65'
MF	7	Stella Mbachu
MF	4	Perpetua Nkwocha
FW	10	Mercy Akide
Substitutions:
MF	2	Efioanwan Ekpo	(substituted in) 63'
DF	5	Onome Ebi	(substituted in) 83'
FW	8	Yusuf Olaitan	(substituted in) 89'
Manager:
Samuel Okpodu

Player of the Match:
Hanna Ljungberg (Sweden)

Assistant referees:
Denise Robinson (Canada)
Lynda Bramble (Trinidad and Tobago)
Fourth official:
Katriina Elovirta (Finland)

=== North Korea vs United States ===
September 28, 2003
15:45

North Korea	0–3	United States
	Report	Wambach 17' (pen.); Reddick 48', 66'

Columbus Crew Stadium, Columbus
Attendance: 22,828
Referee: Sueli Tortura (Brazil)

GK	1	Ri Jong-hui (c)
DF	2	Yun In Sil
DF	6	Ra Mi Ae
DF	5	Sin Kum Ok		(substituted off) 26'
DF	12	Jang Ok Gyong
MF	11	Yun Yong Hui		(substituted off) 74'
MF	14	O Kum Ran	(yellow card) 16'	(substituted off) 53'
MF	15	Ri Un Gyong
MF	19	Ri Hyang Ok
FW	7	Ri Kum Suk
FW	10	Jin Pyol Hui
Substitutions:
DF	17	Jon Hye Yong		(substituted in) 26'
DF	13	Song Jong Sun		(substituted in) 53'
FW	16	Pak Kyong Sun	(yellow card) 90+1'	(substituted in) 74'
Manager:
Song Gun Ri

GK	1	Briana Scurry
DF	2	Kylie Bivens
DF	3	Christie Rampone
DF	14	Joy Fawcett (c)
DF	15	Kate Markgraf		(substituted off) 73'
DF	4	Cat Whitehill
MF	13	Kristine Lilly		(substituted off) 46'
MF	5	Tiffany Roberts
MF	10	Aly Wagner
FW	16	Tiffeny Milbrett	(yellow card) 40'
FW	20	Abby Wambach	(yellow card) 22'	(substituted off) 56'
Substitutions:
MF	11	Julie Foudy		(substituted in) 46'
FW	8	Shannon MacMillan		(substituted in) 56'
DF	17	Danielle Slaton		(substituted in) 73'
Manager:
April Heinrichs

Player of the Match:
Cat Whitehill (United States)

Assistant referees:
Cleidy Mary Ribeiro (Brazil)
Marlei Silva (Brazil)
Fourth official:
Katriina Elovirta (Finland)

== See also ==
- Nigeria at the FIFA Women's World Cup
- North Korea at the FIFA Women's World Cup
- Sweden at the FIFA Women's World Cup
- United States at the FIFA Women's World Cup
