= Ugochi Opara =

Nigerian footballer

Personal information
- Date of birth: 27 May 1976 (age 50)
- Position: Goalkeeper

International career^{‡}
Years	Team	Apps	(Gls)
	Nigeria	0	(0)
- ‡ National team caps and goals as of 20 September 2003 (before the 2003 FIFA Women's World Cup)

Ugochi Opara (born 27 May 1976) is a Nigerian footballer who played as a goalkeeper for the Nigeria women's national football team. She was part of the team at the 1995 and 2003 FIFA Women's World Cups.

== Club career ==
Ugochi was a member of the Pelican star from 07/2003 to 06/2004 where she played as a goalkeeper.

== International career ==
She participated in the FIFA friendlies league in 2003 with the Nigeria team.

Group A

Pos	Team	Pld	W	D	L	GF	GA	GD	Pts	Qualification
1	United States (H)	3	3	0	0	11	1	+10	9	Advance to knockout stage
2	Sweden	3	2	0	1	5	3	+2	6	Advance to knockout stage
3	North Korea	3	1	0	2	3	4	−1	3	
4	Nigeria	3	0	0	3	0	11	−11	0	

Source: FIFA
(H) Hosts
September 20, 2003
14:45 EDT (UTC−4)

Nigeria	0–3	North Korea
	Report	Jin Pyol-hui 13', 88'; Ri Un-gyong 73'

Lincoln Financial Field, Philadelphia
Attendance: 24,347
Referee: Nicole Petignat (Switzerland)
September 21, 2003
12:30 EDT (UTC−4)

United States	3–1	Sweden
Lilly 27'; Parlow 36'; Boxx 78'	Report	Svensson 58'

Robert F. Kennedy Memorial Stadium, Washington, D.C.
Attendance: 34,144
Referee: Zhang Dongqing (China PR)

September 25, 2003
16:45 EDT (UTC−4)

Sweden	1–0	North Korea
Svensson 7'	Report

Lincoln Financial Field, Philadelphia
Attendance: 31,553
Referee: Tammy Ogston (Australia)
September 25, 2003
19:30 EDT (UTC−4)

United States	5–0	Nigeria
Hamm 6' (pen.), 12'; Parlow 47'; Wambach 65'; Foudy 89' (pen.)	Report

Lincoln Financial Field, Philadelphia
Attendance: 31,553
Referee: Florencia Romano (Argentina)

September 28, 2003
13:00 EDT (UTC−4)

Sweden	3–0	Nigeria
Ljungberg 56', 79'; Moström 81'	Report

Columbus Crew Stadium, Columbus
Attendance: 22,828
Referee: Sonia Denoncourt (Canada)
September 28, 2003
15:45 EDT (UTC−4)

North Korea	0–3	United States
	Report	Wambach 17' (pen.); Reddick 48', 66'

Columbus Crew Stadium, Columbus
Attendance: 22,828
Referee: Sueli Tortura (Brazil)
