= Park Hae-jung =

Park Hae-jung may refer to the following South Korean sportswomen:

- Park Hae-jung (footballer) (born 1977)
- Park Hae-jung (table tennis) (born 1972)

== See also ==
- Park Hae-jin, South Korean actor
