= Kim Ju-hee =

South Korean footballer (born 1985)

Personal information
- Date of birth: 10 March 1985 (age 41)
- Position: Midfielder

Senior career*
Years	Team	Apps	(Gls)
- Wirye High School
- Incheon Red Angels

International career^{‡}
	South Korea	2	(0)
- * Club domestic league appearances and goals ‡ National team caps and goals as of 29 September 2003

- Kim Ju-hee
- Hangul: 김주희
- RR: Gim Juhui
- MR: Kim Chuhŭi

Kim Ju-hee (born 10 March 1985) is a South Korean women's international footballer who plays as a midfielder. She is a member of the South Korea women's national football team. She was part of the 2003 FIFA Women's World Cup team. At club level, she plays for Wirye Information Industry High School in South Korea.
