= Maria Pigaleva =

Russian footballer (born 1981)

Personal information
- Date of birth: 19 February 1981 (age 45)
- Position: Goalkeeper

International career^{‡}
Years	Team	Apps	(Gls)
- Russia
- ‡ National team caps and goals as of 20 September 2003 (before the 2003 FIFA Women's World Cup)

Maria Pigaleva (born 19 February 1981) is a former Russian women's international footballer who played as a goalkeeper. She was a member of the Russia women's national football team. She was part of the team at the 2003 FIFA Women's World Cup.
