= Bunmi Kayode =

Nigerian footballer

Personal information
- Date of birth: 13 April 1985 (age 41)
- Place of birth: Efon Alaaye, Ekiti state
- Position: Defender

International career^{‡}
Years	Team	Apps	(Gls)
	Nigeria	2	(0)
- ‡ National team caps and goals as of 27 September 2003

Bunmi Kayode (born 13 April 1985) is a Nigerian international footballer who plays as a defender. She is a member of the Nigeria women's national football team. She was part of the team at the 2003 FIFA Women's World Cup.
