= Ri Un-ju =

North Korean footballer

Personal information
- Date of birth: 25 October 1983 (age 43)
- Position: Defender

International career^{‡}
Years	Team	Apps	(Gls)
- North Korea
- ‡ National team caps and goals as of 20 September 2003 (before the 2003 FIFA Women's World Cup)

Ri Un-ju (born 25 October 1983) is a North Korean women's international footballer who plays as a defender. She is a member of the North Korea women's national football team. She was part of the team at the 2003 FIFA Women's World Cup.
