= Kim Yeo-jin (footballer, born 1979) =

South Korean footballer

Personal information
- Date of birth: 17 July 1979 (age 47)
- Height: 1.61 m (5 ft 3 in)
- Position: Defender

Senior career*
Years	Team	Apps	(Gls)
1999-2002	Soongmin Wonders		
2003-2005	INI Steel		

International career^{‡}
1996-2004	South Korea	39	(3)
- * Club domestic league appearances and goals ‡ National team caps and goals as of 00:20, 22 July 2026 (UTC)

Kim Yeo-jin (born 17 July 1979) is a South Korean former footballer who played as a defender for the South Korea women's national football team. She played at the 2003 FIFA Women's World Cup.

== Club career ==
As a youth, Kim played for Hyundai Girls' High School, who were runners-up in the U-18 girls' section of the National Football Championship in 1996 and 1997. Kim, who was already playing for the national team, was named tournament MVP in 1997. She went on to play for Hanyang Women's University.

Kim joined Soongmin Wonders upon the club's foundation in late 1999. With the club's disbandment imminent, Kim played in Soongmin's final match despite not being fully recovered from surgery for a knee injury.

Kim later joined INI Steel, but stopped playing in April 2005 after another knee injury that required surgery. Later the same year, she returned to football, attending trials for new team Ilhwa Chunma. She was subsequently selected by the club to join their inaugural squad.

== Career statistics ==
=== International ===
As of match played 22 April 2004

Appearances and goals by national team and year
National team	Year	Apps	Goals
South Korea	1996	2	0
South Korea	1997	2	0
South Korea	1998	4	0
South Korea	1999	9	3
South Korea	2000	4	0
South Korea	2001	3	0
South Korea	2002	0	0
South Korea	2003	13	0
South Korea	2004	2	0
Total		39	3

Scores and results list South Korea's goal tally first, score column indicates score after each Kim Yeo-jin goal.

List of international goals scored by Kim Yeo-jin
No.	Date	Venue	Opponent	Score	Result	Competition
1	13 November 1999	Panaad Stadium, Bacolod, Philippines	Guam	–	11–0	1999 AFC Women's Championship
2	13 November 1999	Panaad Stadium, Bacolod, Philippines	Guam	–	11–0	1999 AFC Women's Championship
3	15 November 1999	Panaad Stadium, Bacolod, Philippines	Hong Kong	–	14–0	1999 AFC Women's Championship
