= Sara Call =

Swedish footballer

Personal information
- Date of birth: 16 July 1977 (age 49)
- Place of birth: Sweden
- Position: Defender

International career^{‡}
| Years | Team | Apps | (Gls) |
| | Sweden | 36 | (1) |
- ‡ National team caps and goals as of 2017

Sara Call (born 16 July 1977) is a Swedish former football defender who played for the Sweden women's national football team. She represented Sweden at the 2003 FIFA Women's World Cup qualification at the 2000 Summer Olympics.
