= Karin Bredland =

Norwegian footballer (born 1978)

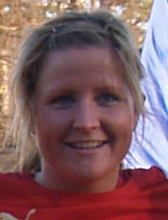

Personal information
- Full name: Karin Johanne Bredland
- Date of birth: 7 January 1978 (age 48)
- Position: Midfielder

Youth career
- Søgne

Senior career*
Years	Team	Apps	(Gls)
1999–2008	Røa		
2010–2011	Røa		

International career^{‡}
	Norway	1	
- * Club domestic league appearances and goals ‡ National team caps and goals as of 20 September 2003 (before the 2003 FIFA Women's World Cup)

Karin Johanne Bredland (born 7 January 1978) is a retired Norwegian women's international footballer who plays as a midfielder. She is a member of the Norway women's national football team. She was part of the team at the 2003 FIFA Women's World Cup. On club level she played for Røa IL in Norway.
