= Esther Okhae =

Nigerian footballer (born 1986)

Personal information
- Date of birth: 12 March 1986 (age 40)
- Position: Goalkeeper

International career^{‡}
Years	Team	Apps	(Gls)
	Nigeria	0	(0)
- ‡ National team caps and goals as of 20 September 2003 (before the 2003 FIFA Women's World Cup)

Esther Okhae (born 12 March 1986) is a Nigerian international footballer who plays as a goalkeeper. She is a member of the Nigeria women's national football team. She was part of the team at the 2003 FIFA Women's World Cup.
