= Nancy Díaz =

Argentine footballer

Personal information
- Date of birth: 14 March 1973 (age 53)
- Position: Defender

Senior career*
Years	Team	Apps	(Gls)
- Boca Juniors

International career^{‡}
- Argentina
- * Club domestic league appearances and goals ‡ National team caps and goals as of 20 September 2003 (before the 2003 FIFA Women's World Cup)

Nancy Díaz (born 14 March 1973) is an Argentine women's international footballer who plays as a defender. She is a member of the Argentina women's national football team. She was part of the team at the 2003 FIFA Women's World Cup. On club level she plays for Boca Juniors in Argentina.
