= Rafaela (footballer) =

Brazilian footballer

Personal information
- Full name: Rafaela Andrade de Moraes
- Date of birth: 23 May 1981 (age 45)
- Place of birth: Paranacity, Brazil
- Position: Midfielder

Senior career*
Years	Team	Apps	(Gls)
- Japanese club
2009–2011	Collerense	10	(2)

International career^{‡}
	Brazil	2	(0)
- * Club domestic league appearances and goals ‡ National team caps and goals as of 29 September 2003

Rafaela Andrade de Moraes (born 23 May 1981), commonly known as Rafaela, is a Brazilian women's international footballer who plays as a midfielder. She is a member of the Brazil women's national football team. She was part of the team at the 2003 FIFA Women's World Cup.
