= Severine Goulois =

French footballer (born 1982)

Personal information
- Date of birth: 18 April 1982 (age 44)
- Position: Defender

International career^{‡}
Years	Team	Apps	(Gls)
2003–2004	France	3	
- ‡ National team caps and goals as of 20 September 2003 (before the 2003 FIFA Women's World Cup)

Severine Goulois (born 18 April 1982) is a French footballer who played as a defender for the France women's national football team. She was part of the team at the 2003 FIFA Women's World Cup.
