= Kim Yoo-jin (footballer, born 1981) =

South Korean footballer

Personal information
- Date of birth: 26 September 1981 (age 45)
- Position: Midfielder

Senior career*
| Years | Team | Apps | (Gls) |
- INI Steel

International career^{‡}
| | South Korea | 1 | (0) |
- * Club domestic league appearances and goals ‡ National team caps and goals as of 29 September 2003

- Kim Yoo-jin
- Hangul: 김유진
- RR: Gim Yujin
- MR: Kim Yujin

Kim Yoo-jin (Korean: 김유진; born 26 September 1981) is a retired South Korean women's international footballer who played as a midfielder. She was a member of the South Korea women's national football team. She was part of the team at the 2003 FIFA Women's World Cup. At club level, she played for INI Steel in South Korea.
