= Kim Hwa-song =

North Korean footballer (born 1985)

Personal information
- Date of birth: 19 August 1985 (age 41)
- Position: Defender

International career^{‡}
| Years | Team | Apps | (Gls) |
- North Korea
- ‡ National team caps and goals as of 20 September 2003 (before the 2003 FIFA Women's World Cup)

Kim Hwa-song (Korean: 김화성; born 19 August 1985) is a former North Korean women's international footballer who played as a defender. She was a member of the North Korea women's national football team. She was part of the team at the 2003 FIFA Women's World Cup.
