= Lincoln Financial Field =

Stadium in Philadelphia, Pennsylvania

- The Linc

- Lincoln Financial Field in 2025

- Location in Philadelphia Location in Pennsylvania Location in the United States
- Former names: Philadelphia Stadium (2026 FIFA World Cup)
- Address: 1020 Pattison Avenue
- Location: Philadelphia, Pennsylvania, United States
- Coordinates: 39°54′3″N 75°10′3″W
- Owner: City of Philadelphia
- Operator: Philadelphia Eagles
- Capacity: 67,594; 68,324 (2026 FIFA World Cup)
- Executive suites: 172
- Surface: HERO Hybrid Grass
- Scoreboard: Panasonic; North End-zone 192' x 27'; South End-zone 160' x 27'
- Record attendance: 145,298 (Wrestlemania XL, April 6 and 7, 2024)
- Field size: 790 by 825 feet (241 m × 251 m) – 15 acres (6.1 ha) (Stadium footprint)
- Public transit: SEPTA Metro: (NRG); SEPTA bus: 4, 45, 68

Construction
- Groundbreaking: May 7, 2001; 25 years ago
- Opened: August 3, 2003; 23 years ago
- Renovated: 2013–14
- Expanded: 2013–14
- Cost: US$512 million ($896 million in 2025 dollars)
- Architects: NBBJ; Agoos Lovera Architects
- Project manager: KUD International
- Structural engineers: Ove Arup & Partners
- Services engineer: M-E Engineers Inc.
- General contractor: Turner Construction
- Main contractors: Keating Building Corp., McKissack Group Inc.

Tenants
- Philadelphia Eagles (NFL) (2003–present); Temple Owls football (NCAA) (2003–present); Philadelphia Union (MLS) (2010)

Website
- lincolnfinancialfield.com

Lincoln Financial Field is an American football stadium in Philadelphia, Pennsylvania, United States. It is the home stadium of the Philadelphia Eagles of the National Football League (NFL) and the Temple Owls football team of Temple University. The stadium is located in South Philadelphia on Pattison Avenue between 11th and South Darien streets alongside Interstate 95. It is part of the South Philadelphia Sports Complex and has a seating capacity of 67,594.

The stadium opened on August 3, 2003, after two years of construction that began on May 7, 2001, replacing Veterans Stadium, which opened in 1971 and served as the home field for both the Eagles and the Philadelphia Phillies through 2002 and 2003, respectively. While total seating capacity is similar to that of Veterans Stadium, the new stadium includes double the number of luxury and wheelchair-accessible seats and more modern services. The field's construction included several LED video displays and more than 624 feet (190 m) of LED ribbon boards.

Naming rights were sold in June 2002 to the Lincoln Financial Group, for a sum of $139.6 million over 21 years. The City of Philadelphia and the Commonwealth of Pennsylvania cumulatively contributed approximately $188 million in public funding to the stadium construction. Additional construction funding was raised from the sale of stadium builder's licenses, which are necessary to purchase season tickets for some of the stadium's best seating levels. The City of Philadelphia owns the stadium due to the sizable public contribution, but the Eagles lease the stadium from the city as the sole operator of the stadium, giving them full control over the stadium's operations.

The Army–Navy football game is frequently played at the stadium due to Philadelphia being located halfway between the two service academies, the stadium being able to house the large crowds in attendance, and the historic nature of the city. Temple University's Division I college football team also plays their home games at Lincoln Financial Field, paying the Eagles $3 million a year to do so as of February 2020. The Philadelphia Union of Major League Soccer have played exhibition games here against high-profile international clubs when their stadium Subaru Park does not provide adequate seating. The stadium also plays host to several soccer games each year and hosted six matches during the 2026 FIFA World Cup. It has also played host to the NCAA lacrosse national championship five times: 2005, 2006, 2013, 2019, and 2023.

== Features ==
The design of the stadium is meant to evoke the team's namesake eagle with wing like canopies above the east and west stands and the Eagle's Nest balcony beyond the north end-zone. The team's primary eagle logo is patterned in the dark green seats of the upper deck of the east and west stands. Three open corners of the stadium provide fans with views of the Philadelphia skyline and the field. The exterior of the stadium uses a brick façade to reference the historic brick architecture present throughout Philadelphia, while the exposed steel structure evokes the city's bridges and future.

In late spring 2013, the Eagles announced that there would be some major upgrades to Lincoln Financial Field over the next two years. The total project estimate was valued at over $125 million. The upgrades included seating expansion, two new HD video boards, upgraded amenities, WiFi, and two new connecting bridges for upper levels. These upgrades were decided upon after research from season ticket holders, advisory boards, and fan focus groups. The majority of these changes, including WiFi (which would accommodate 45,000 users and have coverage over the entire stadium), were completed by the 2013 home opener. The upgraded sound systems and video boards were finished for the 2014 season.

== Suites and lounges ==
Lincoln Financial Field seen from I-95

There are 172 luxury suites at Lincoln Financial Field. They range in capacity from 12 to 40 people and cost $75,000 to $300,000 per year or $20,000 for a single game rental. The suites are located in six separate areas throughout the stadium. There are 3,040 luxury suite seats in total.

There are two exclusive 40,000 sq ft (3,700 m^{2}) club lounges in the stadium. The lounge on the west side is the "Hyundai Club" and the one on the east side is the "Tork Club". Suite holders and club seat holders have access to these 2 lounges. There are a total of 10,828 club seats in the stadium. These club seats feature some unique benefits above and beyond the lounges. One major benefit is the lounges open hours before the event, in most cases 2–4 hours. The lounges also have multiple full-service bars in them. The seats in the club level are padded, and there is also a wait staff present to serve food and drinks.

== Parking ==
There are numerous parking lots surrounding Lincoln Financial Field. The parking assignments may change depending on other activities in the area on a particular day. According to the stadium's website, all lots cost visitors $45 and $90 for an oversized vehicle. Tailgating is allowed in all lots except for T-X lots. The majority of the lots are public cash lots.

== Notable events ==
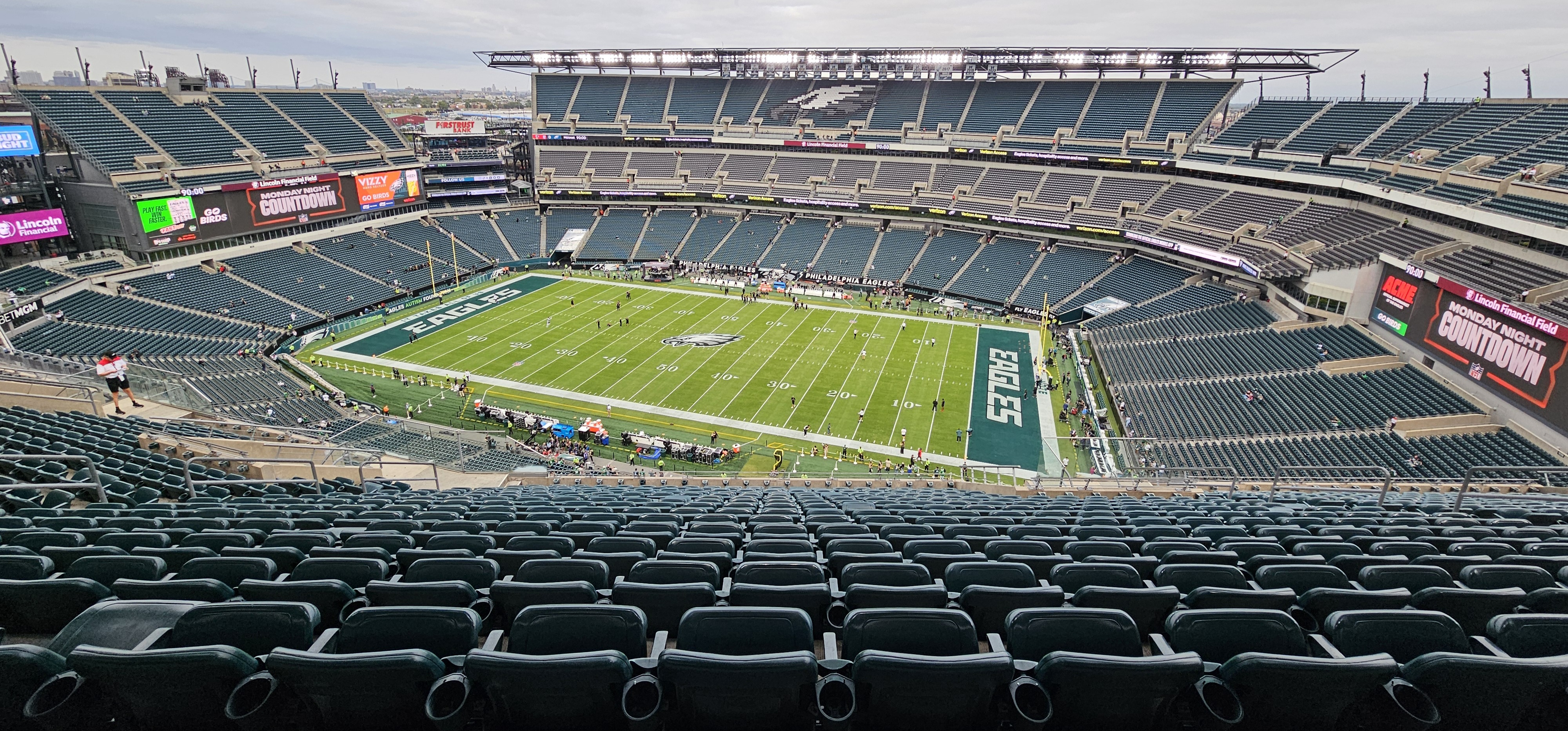
The interior of the stadium in September 2024

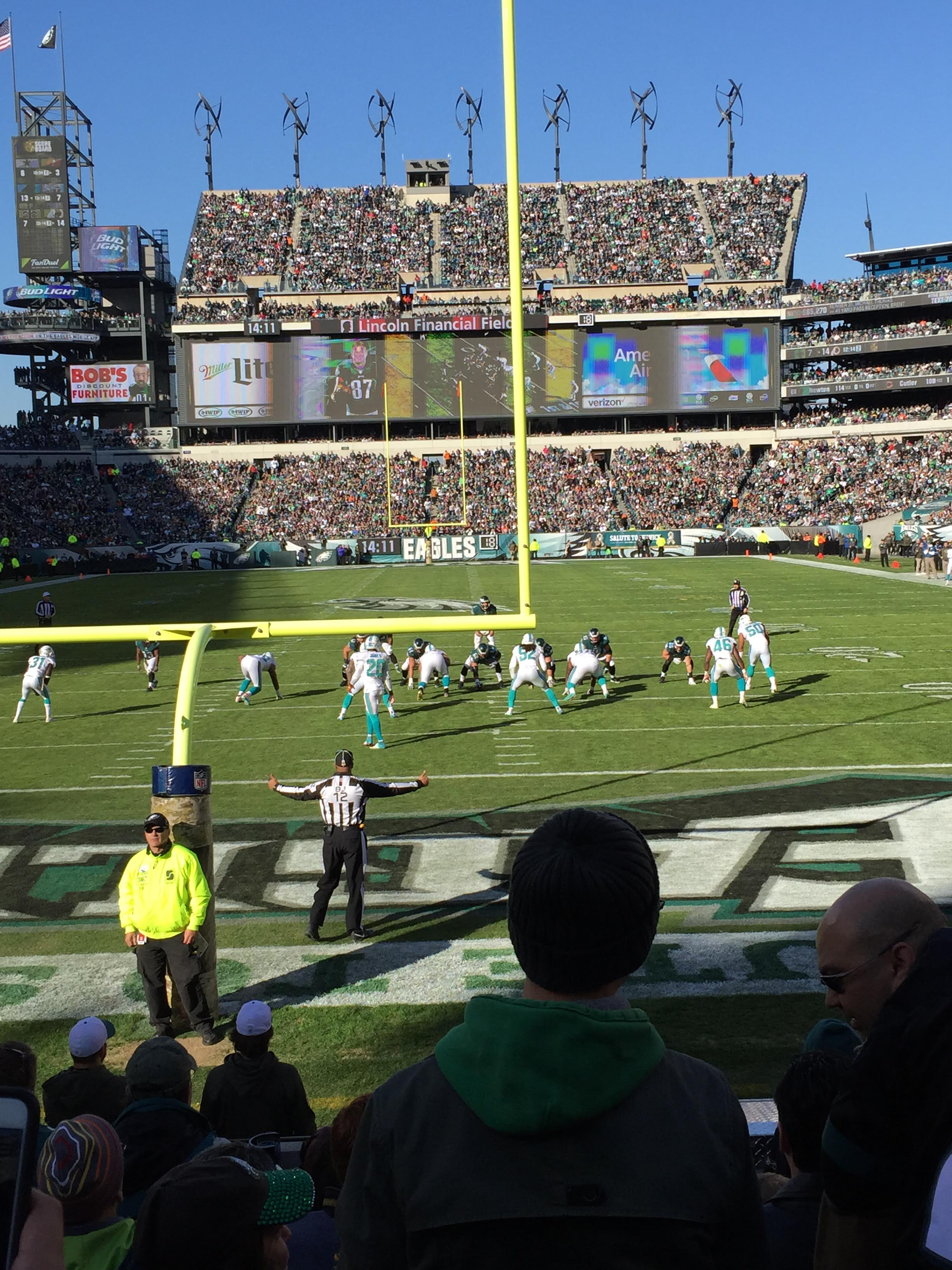
The Miami Dolphins visiting Lincoln Financial Field to play the Philadelphia Eagles in Week 10 of the 2015 NFL season

- August 3, 2003: Lincoln Financial Field hosted its first ticketed event, a soccer match between Manchester United and FC Barcelona
- August 22, 2003: The Philadelphia Eagles hosted the New England Patriots in the first pre-season football game at Lincoln Financial Field, with the Patriots defeating the Eagles 24–12.
- September 6, 2003: Lincoln Financial Field hosted its first regular-season college football game, a college matchup of local Philadelphia rivals, Villanova and Temple. Villanova prevailed 23–20 in double overtime.
- September 8, 2003: The Eagles and the Tampa Bay Buccaneers competed on Monday Night Football in the first regular-season NFL game at Lincoln Financial Field. The game was referenced as the "Inaugural Game" at Lincoln Financial Field. The Eagles were shut out by a score of 17–0 in their new home by the Buccaneers. Tampa Bay wide receiver Joe Jurevicius scored the stadium's first touchdown in the third quarter.
- September 14, 2003: Duce Staley scored the first Eagles points at the new stadium, a two-yard touchdown run in the second quarter of a 31–10 loss to the New England Patriots.
- January 11, 2004: NFL Divisional Playoff game (Philadelphia Eagles 20, Green Bay Packers 17). This game is also known as "The Miracle of 4th and 26". Donovan McNabb connected on a 28-yard pass to receiver Freddie Mitchell on 4th and 26 late in the 4th quarter with the Eagles out of timeouts. This led to the game-tying field goal that sent the game into overtime. In the overtime period, Brett Favre tossed an interception to Brian Dawkins, which set up David Akers' game-deciding 37-yard field goal that sent the Eagles to their third straight NFC Championship Game.
- May 2004: Minor modifications were made to the stadium to change capacity slightly. Some seats were removed from the club box level to increase handicap access. The temporary seats were removed in the north east end zone and a permanent structure was erected and formally named The Pepsi Zone. It is designed as a family-friendly section.
- January 23, 2005: NFC Championship Game (Philadelphia Eagles 27, Atlanta Falcons 10). Eagles advance to the Super Bowl for the first time since 1980.
- April 10, 2010: The Philadelphia Union win their inaugural home opener, a 3–2 victory over D.C. United. A second match was played against FC Dallas on May 15, ending in a 1–1 tie; those games served as home games before the opening of Subaru Park June 27 against Seattle Sounders FC.
- July 21, 2010: Philadelphia Union hosted Manchester United on their North America tour. Manchester United won, 1–0.
- July 26, 2015: In the 2015 CONCACAF Gold Cup final, Mexico defeated Jamaica 3–1 in a nearly sold-out game with 68,930 in attendance.
- October 31, 2015: Temple hosts Notre Dame on ESPN Saturday Night Football on ABC in primetime in front of a sold-out record crowd of 69,280. Notre Dame defeated Temple 24–20.
- January 21, 2018: NFC Championship Game (Philadelphia Eagles 38, Minnesota Vikings 7). Eagles advance to the Super Bowl for the first time in thirteen years.
- September 6, 2018: NFL Kickoff Game (Philadelphia Eagles 18, Atlanta Falcons 12). The Super Bowl champion Philadelphia Eagles defeated the Atlanta Falcons in a rematch of their 2017 NFC Divisional Playoff matchup.
- February 23, 2019: In the 2019 NHL Stadium Series, the Philadelphia Flyers defeated the Pittsburgh Penguins 4–3 in overtime, in front of a crowd of 69,620, the largest recorded attendance for a hockey game in Pennsylvania.
- November 20, 2019: The Linc hosted a high school football game between the Pleasantville Greyhounds and Camden Panthers in a resumption of a game that was interrupted on November 15 due to a shooting that left one dead.
- January 29, 2023: NFC Championship Game (Philadelphia Eagles 31, San Francisco 49ers 7). The Eagles won in dominant fashion against the 49ers to advance to Super Bowl LVII.
- April 6–7, 2024: WWE held their 40th annual WrestleMania, the largest annual pro-wrestling event, at this venue. The event was held across 2 nights. WrestleMania XL holds significance as the first pro-wrestling event taking place in the stadium.
- January 26, 2025: NFC Championship Game (Philadelphia Eagles 55, Washington Commanders 23). The Eagles dominated the Commanders to win their 5th NFC title and 6th overall conference title in franchise history to advance to Super Bowl LIX.
- September 4, 2025: NFL Kickoff Game (Philadelphia Eagles 24, Dallas Cowboys 20). The Super Bowl champion Philadelphia Eagles defeated their longtime rival Dallas Cowboys.
- January 31, 2026: After having their competition postponed due to severe weather and high winds that resulted in injuries on New Year's Day, the Linc welcomed members of the String Band Association of the Philadelphia Mummers for the "String Band Spectacular." It featured the full New Year's Day lineup, with the Quaker City String Band taking home the championship trophy. Other fan-favorite bands performing full routines, music, and props included Fralinger, South Philadelphia, and Avalon.

== Training camp ==
The Eagles decided after the 2012 season to move training camp from Lehigh University in Bethlehem to Philadelphia. As a part of this new agreement, the Eagles will have multiple practices, which are open to the public, at Lincoln Financial Field. The rest of the practices will be closed, and will take place across the street at the NovaCare Complex.

== College football ==
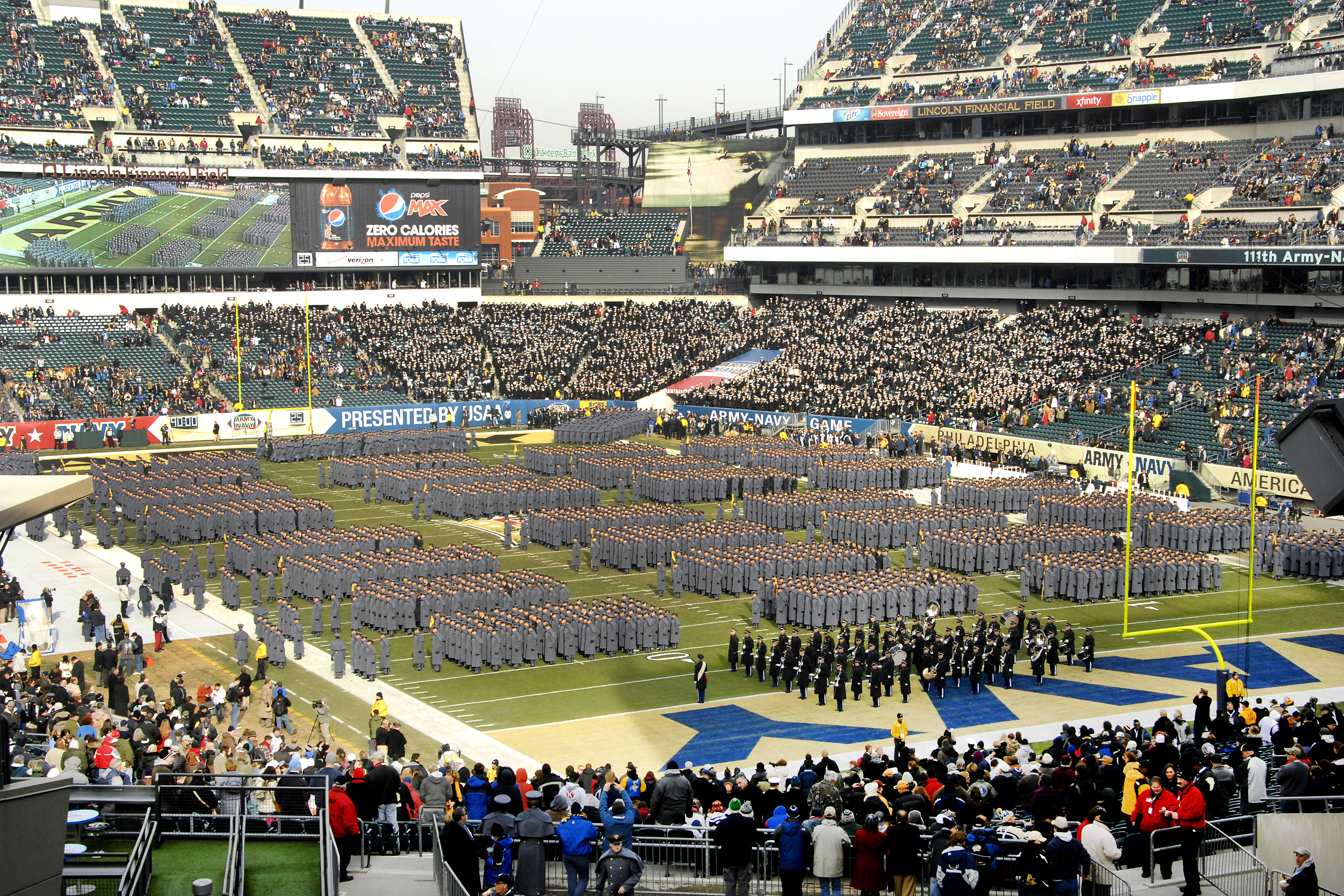
The Army–Navy Game at Lincoln Financial Field in 2010

Lincoln Financial Field is the home field for Temple University football. On August 13, 2003, the Philadelphia Eagles and Temple University announced a 15-year agreement for Temple to play their home football games at Lincoln Financial Field. Temple played its first game at the Linc on September 6, 2003, against Villanova, the teams' first meeting since 1980. During the 2015 season, the Temple Owls sold out the Linc on two occasions. The September 5 season opener against Penn State, and again on October 31 in a prime time matchup against Notre Dame. With its capacity of 67,594, it is the largest stadium in the American Athletic Conference.

Lincoln Financial Field is the primary home to the Army–Navy Game. The game has been played the most often in Philadelphia. It was played at Veterans Stadium for the final time in 2001, and prior to the Vet, at John F. Kennedy Stadium and Franklin Field. The Linc hosted the game five times between 2003 and 2009. It was announced on June 9, 2009, that the game would be played in Philadelphia at the Linc in 2010, 2012, 2013, 2015 and 2017.

On October 30, 2025, Lincoln Financial Field hosted an HBCU rivalry game between Delaware State University and Norfolk State University. The teams' head coaches were both former Eagles players and teammates: DeSean Jackson for DSU and Michael Vick for NSU. The game was publicized as the "Battle of the Legends" and occurred on a rainy and windy day as remnants from Hurricane Melissa moved past the Atlantic coast. Delaware State won 27–20. The teams will return to Lincoln Financial Field for their 2026 meeting on October 31.

Lincoln Financial Field is one of only five stadiums to be the home of both an NFL and a college team; the other four are Allegiant Stadium in Las Vegas (Raiders and UNLV), Hard Rock Stadium in Miami (Dolphins and Hurricanes), Acrisure Stadium in Pittsburgh (Steelers and Panthers), and Raymond James Stadium in Tampa (Buccaneers and South Florida).

Attendance records

Rank	Attendance	Date	Result
1	69,280	October 31, 2015	21 Temple 20, 9 Notre Dame 24
2	69,179	September 5, 2015	Temple 27, Penn State 10
3	69,029	November 10, 2007	Temple 0, 25 Penn State 31
4	57,323	September 17, 2011	Temple 10, Penn State 14
5	35,279	October 13, 2012	Temple 10, 17 Rutgers 35
6	35,179	October 10, 2015	Temple 49, Tulane 10
7	35,117	September 9, 2017	Temple 16, Villanova 13
8	34,253	October 12, 2019	Temple 30, 23 Memphis 28
9	34,005	September 2, 2016	Temple 13, Army 28
10	33,026	October 20, 2018	Temple 24, 20 Cincinnati 17^{OT}

== Soccer ==
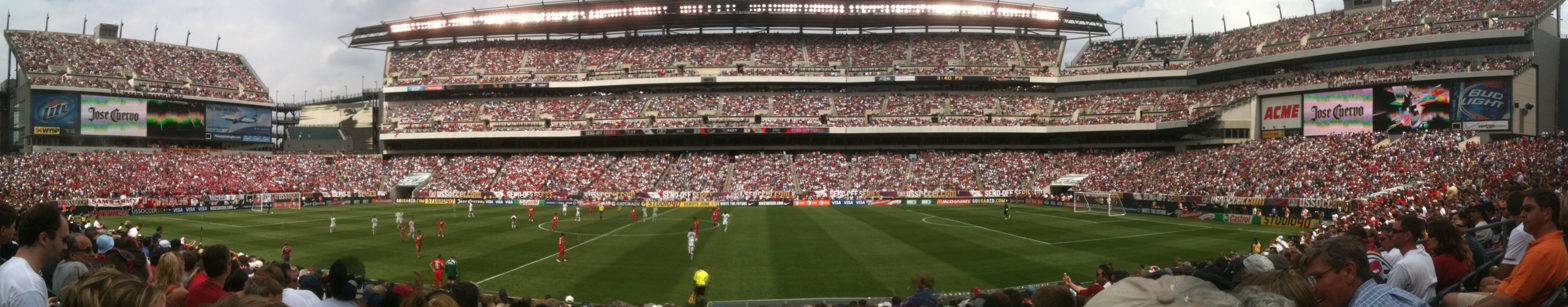
Panorama of the U.S. National Soccer Team playing the national team of Turkey in the 2010 World Cup send-off series

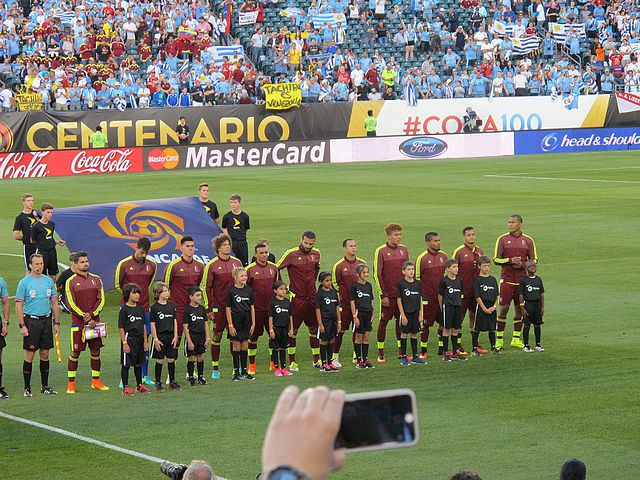
Uruguay vs. Venezuela soccer match at the stadium in June 2016

The stadium opened on August 3, 2003, with 68,396 attending a preseason friendly with Manchester United defeating Barcelona 3–1. It hosted some 2003 FIFA Women's World Cup matches.

In 2004, after winning the gold medal in soccer at the 2004 Summer Olympics, the U.S. women's team conducted a "Fan Celebration Tour", playing ten matches across the United States from September to December 2004. The matches were the final national team appearances for Mia Hamm, Joy Fawcett, and Julie Foudy, all of whom retired after the tour. The team played at the Linc on November 6, 2004, where they lost 3–1 to Denmark in front of 14,812 spectators.

In late July and early August 2004, Manchester United returned to play Celtic and AC Milan played Chelsea in two friendly matches.

On July 18, 2009, Lincoln Financial Field hosted a doubleheader quarterfinal for the 2009 CONCACAF Gold Cup. The first game was between Canada and Honduras, and the second between the United States and Panama. This was the first full international appearance for the United States national soccer team in Philadelphia since a 1968 friendly against Israel at Temple Stadium.

Lincoln Financial Field was listed by U.S. Soccer's World Cup bid committee as one of 18 stadiums to be potential sites for the United States to host the 2022 FIFA World Cup.

The Linc was also the first home of the Philadelphia Union early in 2010. The Union played their home opener against D.C. United at the Linc on April 10, 2010, due to construction delays at their new stadium, PPL Park (now Subaru Park). The Union defeated United, 3–2. The Union also played FC Dallas to a 1–1 tie in the second home game in franchise history at the Linc. After moving to their permanent venue in Chester, the Philadelphia Union continued to use the Linc for matches where ticket demand is expected to far exceed the full capacity at its regular home until 2011. English powerhouse club Manchester United met the Philadelphia Union during their pre-season tour on July 21, 2010, with Manchester United defeating the Union by a score of 1–0. The Union played the Spanish powerhouse club Real Madrid on July 24, 2011, with Real Madrid prevailing, 2–1.

Lincoln Financial Field also hosted the U.S. National team's final match on home soil before the 2010 World Cup. The US defeated Turkey 2–1 on May 29, 2010.

The U.S. men's national team returned to Lincoln Financial Field on August 10, 2011, for an international friendly match against Mexico, where they tied 1-1.

In 2012, the stadium hosted a World Football Challenge match between Real Madrid and Celtic F.C. with Real Madrid winning 2–0.

On August 2, 2014, Lincoln Financial Field hosted a soccer match between A.S. Roma and Inter Milan which was part of the 2014 International Champions Cup. Inter Milan won the match 2–0.

On July 26, 2015, the Linc hosted the final match of the 2015 CONCACAF Gold Cup.

In 2016, the stadium hosted games in the Copa América Centenario.

The Linc hosted a doubleheader of quarterfinals of the 2017 CONCACAF Gold Cup and did so again for the 2019 CONCACAF Gold Cup.

On July 25, 2018, the Linc hosted a 2018 International Champions Cup match between Juventus FC and FC Bayern Munich that Juventus won 2–0.

On August 29, 2019, the Linc hosted the U.S. Women's National Team in the second match of their victory tour in a game against Portugal. The match set the record for the highest attendance for the team in a friendly match, attracting 49,504 fans. The United States won 4–0.

On July 31, 2024, Lincoln Financial Field hosted a friendly between Liverpool and Arsenal, with Liverpool winning 2–1. The match attracted a total of 69,879 fans, setting the record for the highest-attended soccer match in the stadium's history.

Date	Winning Team	Result	Losing Team	Tournament
August 3, 2003	(England) Manchester United	3–1	(Spain) Barcelona	Friendly
July 28, 2004	(Scotland) Celtic	2–1	(England) Manchester United	Friendly
August 2, 2004	(Italy) AC Milan	3–2	(England) Chelsea	Friendly
November 6, 2004	Denmark	3–1	United States	Friendly
September 13, 2008	United States	2–0	Republic of Ireland	Friendly
July 19, 2009	United States	2–1	Panama	2009 CONCACAF Gold Cup
July 19, 2009	Honduras	1–0	Canada	2009 CONCACAF Gold Cup
April 10, 2010	(United States) Philadelphia Union	3–2	(United States) D.C. United	2010 MLS Season
May 15, 2010	(United States) Philadelphia Union	1–1	(United States) FC Dallas	2010 MLS Season
May 29, 2010	United States	2–1	Turkey	Friendly
July 20, 2010	(England) Manchester United	1–0	(United States) Philadelphia Union	Friendly
July 24, 2011	(Spain) Real Madrid	2–1	(United States) Philadelphia Union	Friendly
August 10, 2011	United States	1–1	Mexico	Friendly
August 11, 2012	(Spain) Real Madrid	2–0	(Scotland) Celtic	2012 World Football Challenge
August 3, 2014	(Italy) Inter Milan	2–0	(Italy) Roma	2014 International Champions Cup
July 26, 2015	Mexico	3–1	Jamaica	2015 CONCACAF Gold Cup Final
June 9, 2016	Venezuela	1–0	Uruguay	Copa América Centenario
June 11, 2016	United States	1–0	Paraguay	Copa América Centenario
June 14, 2016	Chile	4–2	Panama	Copa América Centenario
July 19, 2017	Costa Rica	1–0	Panama	2017 CONCACAF Gold Cup
July 19, 2017	United States	2–0	El Salvador	2017 CONCACAF Gold Cup
July 25, 2018	(Italy) Juventus	2–0	(Germany) Bayern Munich	2018 International Champions Cup
June 30, 2019	Jamaica	1–0	Panama	2019 CONCACAF Gold Cup
June 30, 2019	United States	1–0	Curaçao	2019 CONCACAF Gold Cup
August 29, 2019	United States	4–0	Portugal	Friendly
July 22, 2023	(England) Chelsea	4–3	(England) Brighton & Hove Albion	2023 Premier League Summer Series
July 23, 2023	(England) Fulham	3–2	(England) Brentford	2023 Premier League Summer Series
July 23, 2023	(England) Newcastle United	3–3	(England) Aston Villa	2023 Premier League Summer Series
October 17, 2023	Mexico	2–2	Germany	Friendly
March 22, 2024	Argentina	3–0	El Salvador	Friendly
June 14, 2024	Peru	1–0	El Salvador	Friendly
July 31, 2024	(England) Liverpool	2–1	(England) Arsenal	Friendly

=== 2003 FIFA Women's World Cup ===
Date	Winning Team	Result	Losing Team	Group	Attendance
September 20, 2003	Norway	2–0	France	Group B	24,347
September 20, 2003	North Korea	3–0	Nigeria	Group A	24,347
September 25, 2003	Sweden	1–0	North Korea	Group A	31,553
September 25, 2003	United States	5–0	Nigeria	Group A	31,553

=== 2025 FIFA Club World Cup ===
Date	Time (UTC−4)	Team #1	Res.	Team #2	Round	Attendance
June 16, 2025	21:00	(Brazil) Flamengo	2–0	(Tunisia) ES Tunis	Group D	25,797
June 18, 2025	12:00	(England) Manchester City	2–0	(Morocco) Wydad AC	Group G	37,446
June 20, 2025	14:00	(Brazil) Flamengo	3–1	(England) Chelsea	Group D	54,619
June 22, 2025	12:00	(Italy) Juventus	4–1	(Morocco) Wydad AC	Group G	31,975
June 24, 2025	21:00	(Tunisia) ES Tunis	0–3	(England) Chelsea	Group D	32,967
June 26, 2025	21:00	(Austria) Red Bull Salzburg	0–3	(Spain) Real Madrid	Group H	64,811
June 28, 2025	12:00	(Brazil) Palmeiras	1–0 (a.e.t.)	(Brazil) Botafogo	Round of 16	33,657
July 4, 2025	15:00	(Brazil) Palmeiras	1–2	(England) Chelsea	Quarter-finals	65,782

=== 2026 FIFA World Cup ===
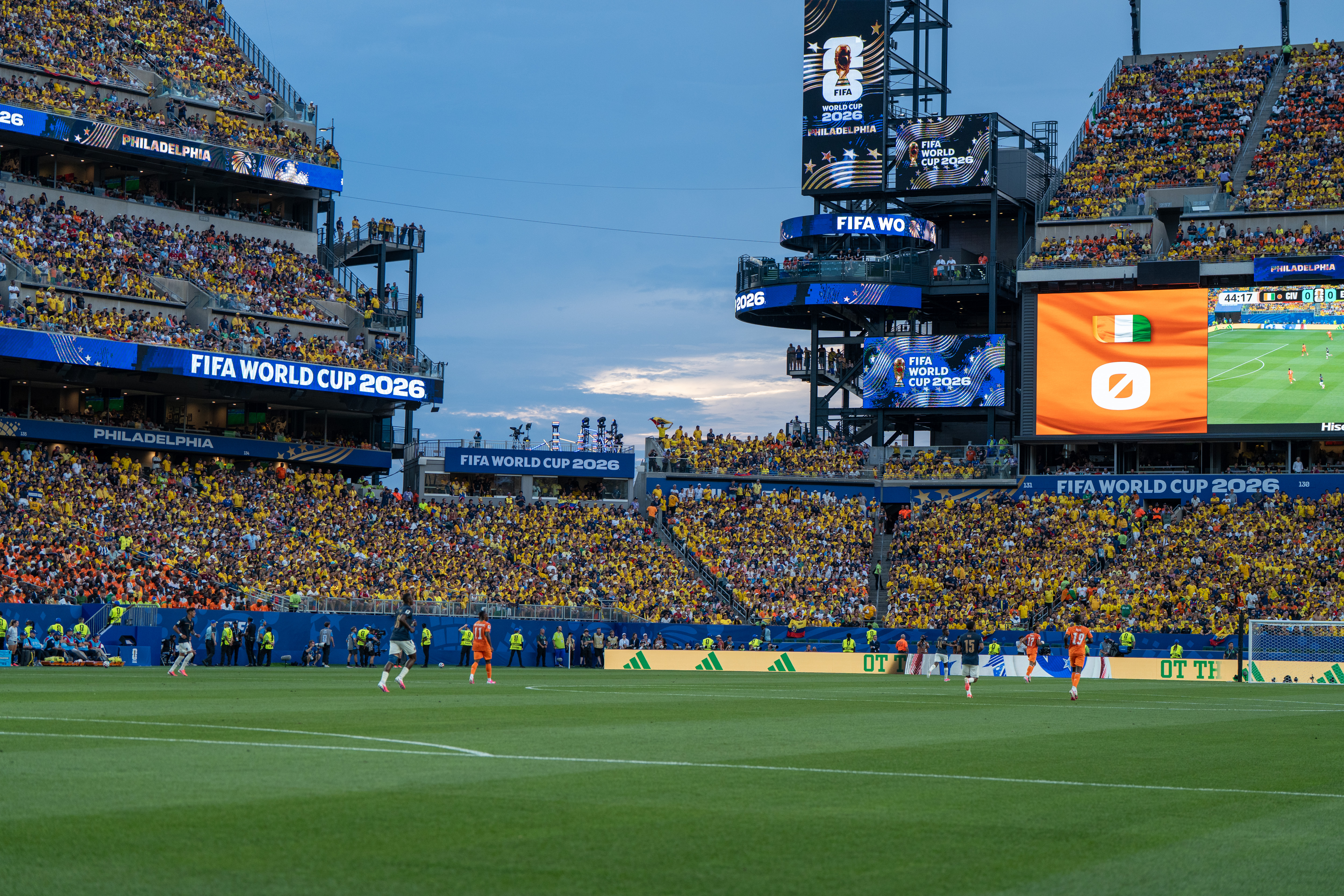
Inside Lincoln Financial Field during a match between Cote D'Ivoire and Ecuador at the 2026 FIFA World Cup.

Lincoln Financial Field hosted six matches during the 2026 FIFA World Cup, making it one of the eleven selected United States venues. During the event, the stadium was temporarily renamed to "Philadelphia Stadium" in accordance with FIFA's policy on corporate sponsored names. The stadium hosted five group stage matches and one Round of 16 match on Independence Day.

Date	Time (UTC−4)	Team #1	Result	Team #2	Round	Attendance
June 14, 2026	19:00	Ivory Coast	1–0	Ecuador	Group E	68,274
June 19, 2026	21:00	Brazil	3–0	Haiti	Group C	68,324
June 22, 2026	17:00	France	3–0	Iraq	Group I	68,324
June 25, 2026	16:00	Curaçao	0–2	Ivory Coast	Group E	68,324
June 27, 2026	17:00	Croatia	2–1	Ghana	Group L	68,324
July 4, 2026	17:00	Paraguay	0–1	France	Round of 16	68,324

== Other sports ==
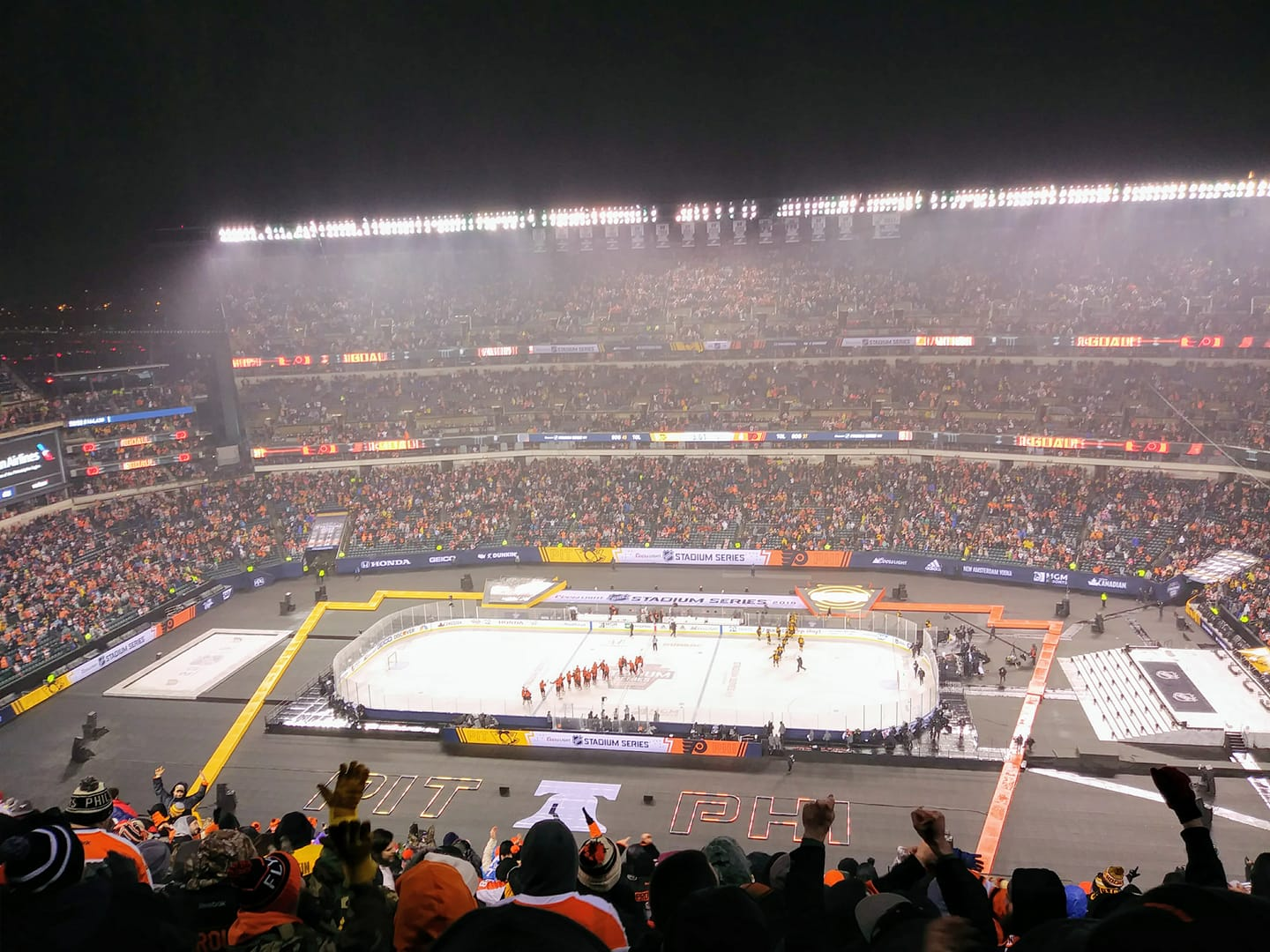
The 2019 NHL Stadium Series game after the Philadelphia Flyers defeated the Pittsburgh Penguins 4–3 in overtime

The NCAA Division I Men's Lacrosse Championship in 2005, 2006, 2013, 2015, 2016, 2019, 2023, and 2024 were held at the stadium. In 2020, the event was scheduled to take place in May but was canceled due to the COVID-19 pandemic.

The Philadelphia Phillies celebrated their 2008 World Series championship with a parade down Broad Street, appearance before a sold-out crowd at the Linc, and then a ceremony at Citizens Bank Park. The Citizens Bank Park ceremony was simulcast to the crowd at the Linc. Tickets to the event at Lincoln Financial Field were made available at no cost to the public and were gone within 45 minutes when they were made available at 3 p.m. on October 30, 2008.

Monster Jam performed at the stadium from 2010 to 2012 as part of the summer stadium tour. After a six-year absence, Monster Jam returned to the stadium on May 5, 2018. Previous events took place during the winter at the Spectrum and the Wells Fargo Center from 2013 to 2015. The Linc would host Monster Jam again in 2022, 2023, 2024, and 2025.

On February 23, 2019, the Philadelphia Flyers defeated the Pittsburgh Penguins 4–3 in overtime in the 2019 NHL Stadium Series in front of a crowd of 69,620, the largest record attendance for a hockey game in Pennsylvania.

Lincoln Financial Field hosted WrestleMania XL on April 6 and 7, 2024.

== Entertainment ==
=== Concerts ===
Date	Artist	Opening act(s)	Tour / Concert name	Attendance	Revenue	Notes
August 8, 2003	Bruce Springsteen & The E Street Band	—N/a	The Rising Tour	139,318 / 147,763	$10,342,060	
August 9, 2003	Bruce Springsteen & The E Street Band	—N/a	The Rising Tour	139,318 / 147,763	$10,342,060	
August 11, 2003	Bruce Springsteen & The E Street Band	—N/a	The Rising Tour	139,318 / 147,763	$10,342,060	
July 19, 2008	Kenny Chesney	Keith Urban; LeAnn Rimes; Gary Allan; Luke Bryan; Sammy Hagar	The Poets and Pirates Tour	49,169 / 50,017	$4,519,632	Before 2008 his tours were performed at Xfinity Mobile Arena or Susquehanna Bank Center. His summer tours have been held here ever since.
June 27, 2009	Kenny Chesney	Lady Antebellum; Miranda Lambert; Sugarland; Montgomery Gentry	Sun City Carnival Tour	52,343 / 52,343	$4,407,377	
June 18, 2011	Kenny Chesney; Zac Brown Band	Billy Currington; Uncle Kracker	Goin' Coastal Tour	54,166 / 54,166	$5,084,803	
July 14, 2011	U2	Interpol	U2 360° Tour	75,796 / 75,796	$6,536,230	The show was originally scheduled to take place on July 12, 2010, but was postponed, due to Bono's emergency back surgery.
August 6, 2011	Taylor Swift	Needtobreathe; Hunter Hayes; James Wesley	Speak Now World Tour	51,395 / 51,395	$4,268,678	
June 16, 2012	Kenny Chesney; Tim McGraw	Grace Potter and the Nocturnals; Jake Owen	Brothers of the Sun Tour	53,111 / 53,111	$5,541,757	
June 8, 2013	Kenny Chesney; Eric Church	Eli Young Band; Kacey Musgraves	No Shoes Nation Tour	50,962 / 50,962	$5,351,550	
July 19, 2013	Taylor Swift	Ed Sheeran; Austin Mahone; Joel Crouse	The Red Tour	101,277 / 101,277	$8,822,335	On the show of July 20, 2013, after the opening acts performed, Swift was about to start her set, until heavy rain as well as lightning delayed the show.
July 20, 2013	Taylor Swift	Ed Sheeran; Austin Mahone; Joel Crouse	The Red Tour	101,277 / 101,277	$8,822,335	On the show of July 20, 2013, after the opening acts performed, Swift was about to start her set, until heavy rain as well as lightning delayed the show.
August 13, 2014	One Direction	5 Seconds of Summer	Where We Are Tour	101,527 / 101,527	$8,818,556	
August 14, 2014	One Direction	5 Seconds of Summer	Where We Are Tour	101,527 / 101,527	$8,818,556	
August 15, 2014	Luke Bryan	Brantley Gilbert; Lee Brice; Cole Swindell; DJ Rock	That's My Kind of Night Tour	48,576 / 48,576	$3,896,840	
June 12, 2015	Taylor Swift	Vance Joy; Shawn Mendes	The 1989 World Tour	101,052 / 101,052	$11,987,816	Echosmith, Cara Delevingne & Mariska Hargitay were special guests.
June 13, 2015	Taylor Swift	Vance Joy; Shawn Mendes	The 1989 World Tour	101,052 / 101,052	$11,987,816	Rachel Platten and Mariska Hargitay were special guests.
July 11, 2015	Kenny Chesney	Eric Church; Brantley Gilbert; Chase Rice; Old Dominion	The Big Revival Tour	55,131 / 55,131	$5,952,700	
August 30, 2015	Kevin Hart	—N/a	What Now? Tour	53,000	—N/a	First comedian to sell out a football stadium for a stand-up comedy show.
September 1, 2015	One Direction	Icona Pop	On the Road Again Tour	47,761 / 47,761	$3,079,651	During the performance, the band performed a cover of "The Fresh Prince of Bel Air" by Will Smith.
June 5, 2016	Beyoncé	DJ Khaled	The Formation World Tour	47,223 / 47,223	$5,563,435	Heavy rain and lighting slightly delayed the start of the concert. Yo Gotti, Young Gunz, Freeway, Meek Mill and Rick Ross joined DJ Khaled during the opening act.
June 25, 2016	Kenny Chesney	Miranda Lambert; Big & Rich; Old Dominion	Spread the Love Tour	48,322 / 50,676	$4,634,450	
July 14, 2016	Guns N' Roses	Wolfmother	Not in This Lifetime... Tour	49,328 / 49,328	$4,883,474	
August 6, 2016	Coldplay	Alessia Cara; Foxes	A Head Full of Dreams Tour	54,497 / 54,497	$5,530,866	
September 29, 2016	Beyoncé	DJ Khaled	The Formation World Tour	44,693 / 44,693	$3,353,627	
May 12, 2017	Metallica	Volbeat	WorldWired Tour	49,722 / 51,728	$5,421,187	Avenged Sevenfold was not able to appear as an opening act for Metallica due to Synyster Gates' wife going into labor.
June 18, 2017	U2	The Lumineers	The Joshua Tree Tour 2017	56,570 / 56,570	$6,259,880	
June 9, 2018	Kenny Chesney	Thomas Rhett; Old Dominion; Brandon Lay	The Trip Around The Sun Tour	55,238 / 55,238	$6,384,845	
July 13, 2018	Taylor Swift	Camila Cabello; Charli XCX	Taylor Swift's Reputation Stadium Tour	107,378 / 107,378	$11,951,047	During the second show, Swift performed "Our Song" and "Wildest Dreams" a cappella after the levitating basket stage used during "Delicate" malfunctioned.
July 14, 2018	Taylor Swift	Camila Cabello; Charli XCX	Taylor Swift's Reputation Stadium Tour	107,378 / 107,378	$11,951,047	During the second show, Swift performed "Our Song" and "Wildest Dreams" a cappella after the levitating basket stage used during "Delicate" malfunctioned.
July 30, 2018	Beyoncé; Jay-Z	Chloe X Halle and DJ Khaled	On the Run II Tour	54,870 / 54,870	$6,709,691	“Black Effect” was premiered and added to the setlist.
September 27, 2018	Ed Sheeran	Snow Patrol; Anne-Marie	÷ Tour	54,292 / 54,292	$5,161,683	
July 23, 2019	The Rolling Stones	Des Rocs	No Filter Tour	51,115 / 51,115	$11,741,373	This concert was originally scheduled to take place on June 4, 2019, but was postponed due to Mick Jagger recovering from a heart procedure.
June 8, 2022	Coldplay	H.E.R.	Music of the Spheres World Tour	57,415 / 57,415	$5,606,712	The band performed a small excerpt of "Fly, Eagles Fly".
June 19, 2022	Kenny Chesney	Carly Pearce; Dan + Shay; Old Dominion	Here and Now Tour			
July 14, 2022	The Weeknd	Kaytranada; Mike Dean	After Hours til Dawn Stadium Tour	46,486 / 46,486	$5,131,280	
August 31, 2022	Rammstein	Duo Jatekok	Rammstein Stadium Tour			Originally scheduled for August 23, 2020
May 12, 2023	Taylor Swift	Phoebe Bridgers; Gayle	The Eras Tour	—	—	First act in stadium history to sell out three shows on a single tour.
May 13, 2023	Taylor Swift	Phoebe Bridgers; Gayle	The Eras Tour	—	—	First act in stadium history to sell out three shows on a single tour.
May 14, 2023	Taylor Swift	Phoebe Bridgers; Gracie Abrams	The Eras Tour	—	—	First act in stadium history to sell out three shows on a single tour.
June 3, 2023	Ed Sheeran	Khalid; Dylan	+–=÷× Tour	77,900 / 77,900	$7,767,923	Broke the previous record for attendance on a single night with 77,900 fans attending the Mathematics tour.
June 16, 2023	Billy Joel; Stevie Nicks		Two Icons: One Night			
July 12, 2023	Beyoncé		Renaissance World Tour	52,181 / 52,181	$11,976,831	
July 28, 2023	Luke Combs	Brent Cobb; The Old Machine Show	Luke Combs World Tour			
July 29, 2023	Luke Combs	Riley Green; Lainey Wilson	Luke Combs World Tour			
June 8, 2024	Kenny Chesney	Zac Brown Band; Megan Moroney; Uncle Kracker	Sun Goes Down Tour			
June 11, 2024	The Rolling Stones	Kaleo	Hackney Diamonds Tour			
August 6, 2024	Zach Bryan	Turnpike Troubadours; Levi Turner	Quittin’ Time Tour			
August 7, 2024	Zach Bryan	Turnpike Troubadours; Levi Turner	Quittin’ Time Tour			
August 18, 2024	P!nk	Sheryl Crow; The Script; KidCutUp	Summer Carnival			
May 5, 2025	Kendrick Lamar; SZA	Mustard	Grand National Tour			
May 10, 2025	George Strait; Chris Stapleton	Parker McCollum				
May 23, 2025	Metallica	Limp Bizkit; Ice Nine Kills	M72 World Tour			
May 25, 2025	Metallica	Pantera; Suicidal Tendencies	M72 World Tour			
July 30, 2025	The Weeknd	Playboi Carti; Mike Dean	After Hours til Dawn Tour			
July 31, 2025	The Weeknd	Playboi Carti; Mike Dean	After Hours til Dawn Tour			
July 31, 2026	Morgan Wallen	Brooks & Dunn; Hudson Westbrook; Blake Whiten	Stil The Problem Tour			
August 1, 2026	Morgan Wallen	Ella Langley; Hudson Westbrook; Blake Whiten	Stil The Problem Tour			
August 13, 2026	Foo Fighters	Queens of the Stone Age; Mannequin Pussy	Take Cover Tour			
September 1, 2026	Bruno Mars	DJ Pee .Wee; Raye	The Romantic Tour			
September 2, 2026	Bruno Mars	DJ Pee .Wee; Raye	The Romantic Tour			
September 19, 2026	Ed Sheeran	Lukas Graham; Aaron Rowe	Loop Tour			Macklemore was removed as an opening act when Lincoln Financial Field and other venues would not allow him to perform.
September 29, 2026	AC/DC	The Pretty Reckless	Power Up Tour			
May 25, 2027	Zach Bryan	John Fogerty; Fey Fili	Young Manhood and Other Donatable Organs Tour			

=== In TV and Movies ===
The stadium is prominently featured in the opening of the television show It's Always Sunny in Philadelphia. It also features in the second episode of season 3 of the show. The stadium also appeared in the 2012 movie Silver Linings Playbook.

In The Walking Dead: The Ones Who Live, the stadium was destroyed in an airstrike during the early days of the zombie apocalypse by U.S. Air Force pilot Donald Okafor, killing 4,000 U.S. Marines, including his own wife, as mentioned in episode 1 of the show. In the same episode, Okafor uses the ruins of the stadium to hold a secret meeting with Rick Grimes and Pearl Thorne. Rick later returns to collect a zombie corpse for his escape plan. In episode 3, Thorne uses the ruins to meet with Rick and Michonne in secret.

It was featured on the finale of The Amazing Race 36.

=== Other events ===
On July 17, 2026, the stadium hosted a comedy show by Pennsylvania native Shane Gillis. The show set two Guinness World Records: largest audience for a comedian (73,946), and the most tickets sold for a solo comedy show (76,212).

== Awards ==
In 2013, Lincoln Financial Field was considered one of the "greenest" NFL stadiums. Energy-efficient additions include 11,000 solar panels, and 14 UGE-4K wind turbines outside and on top of the stadium respectively. These installations account for 30% of the electricity used to run the facility. 2013 also marked the fourth year in a row that the venue made the top of PETA's list of "Vegetarian-Friendly NFL Stadiums".

== See also ==
- List of NCAA Division I FBS football stadiums
- Lists of stadiums

Events and tenants
Preceded by Veterans Stadium	Home of the Philadelphia Eagles; 2003 – present	Succeeded by current
Preceded by Veterans Stadium	Home of the Temple Owls; 2003 – present	Succeeded by current
Preceded by M&T Bank Stadium	Home of the NCAA Lacrosse Final Four; 2005–2006	Succeeded by M&T Bank Stadium
Preceded by Veterans Stadium; Georgia Dome; SoFi Stadium; Levi's Stadium	Host of the NFC Championship Game; 2004–2005; 2018; 2023; 2025	Succeeded by Qwest Field; Mercedes-Benz Superdome; Levi's Stadium; Lumen Field
Preceded by Soldier Field; Chicago	CONCACAF Gold Cup; Final Venue; 2015	Succeeded by Levi's Stadium; Santa Clara
Preceded by SoFi Stadium	Host of WrestleMania; 2024 (XL)	Succeeded by Allegiant Stadium
