= Céline Marty =

French footballer (born 1976)

Celine Marty
Personal information
- Date of birth: 30 March 1976 (age 50)
- Place of birth: Toulouse, France
- Position: Goalkeeper

International career^{‡}
Years	Team	Apps	(Gls)
	France	3	(0)
- ‡ National team caps and goals as of 29 September 2003

Celine Marty (born 30 March 1976) is a French women's international footballer who plays as a goalkeeper. She is a member of the France women's national football team. She was part of the team at the 2003 FIFA Women's World Cup.
