= Pamela Grant =

Australian soccer player

Personal information
- Date of birth: 15 November 1982 (age 43)
- Position: Defender

International career^{‡}
Years	Team	Apps	(Gls)
	Australia	1	(0)
- ‡ National team caps and goals as of 29 September 2003

Pamela Grant (born 15 November 1982) was an Australian women's international footballer who played as a defender. She was a member of the Australia women's national soccer team. She was part of the team at the 2003 FIFA Women's World Cup.

Grant currently plays her club football at the Samford Rangers Football Club.
