= Patricia Ofori =

Ghanaian footballer (1981–2011)

Personal information
- Date of birth: 9 June 1981
- Place of birth: Ghana
- Date of death: 20 April 2011 (aged 29)
- Place of death: Huntsville, Alabama, United States
- Height: 1.70 m (5 ft 7 in)
- Position: Defender

College career
Years	Team	Apps	(Gls)
2005–2007	Alabama A&M Lady Bulldogs		

Senior career*
Years	Team	Apps	(Gls)
2001–2004	Mawuena Ladies		

International career^{‡}
2003–2007	Ghana	8	(0)
- * Club domestic league appearances and goals ‡ National team caps and goals as of 10 September 2007 (before the 2007 FIFA Women's World Cup)

Patricia Ofori (9 June 1981 – 20 April 2011) was a Ghanaian footballer who played as a defender. She has been a member of the Ghana women's national team.

== Early life ==
Ofori was raised in Accra.

== College career ==
Ofori has attended the Alabama A&M University in the United States.

== Club career ==
Ofori has played for Mawuena Ladies in Ghana.

== International career ==
Ofori was a member of the Ghana women's national football team from 2003 to 2007. She was part of the team at the 2003 FIFA Women's World Cup and 2007 FIFA Women's World Cup.

== Death ==
Ofori died on 20 April 2011 in a car accident. Her Ford Mustang collided with a Toyota Tacoma at the intersection of Patterson Lane and Pulaski Pike in the Meridianville area. Her interment was Accra, Ghana in late April 2011.

== See also ==
- List of Ghana women's international footballers
