= Gao Hongxia =

Chinese footballer

Personal information
- Date of birth: 7 December 1973 (age 52)
- Place of birth: China
- Position: Defender

International career
Years	Team	Apps	(Gls)
- China
Medal record
Women's football
Representing China
Asian Games
Silver medal – second place	2002 Busan	Team

Gao Hongxia is a Chinese football player. She was part of the Chinese team at the 1999 FIFA Women's World Cup and 2003 FIFA Women's World Cup.

== International goals ==
No.	Date	Venue	Opponent	Score	Result	Competition
1.	7 October 2002	Busan Gudeok Stadium, Busan, South Korea	Vietnam	2–0	4–1	2002 Asian Games
