= Giselle (footballer) =

Brazilian footballer (born 1983)

Personal information
- Full name: Giselle Pereira de Vasconcellos
- Date of birth: 20 November 1983 (age 42)
- Position: Goalkeeper

Senior career*
Years	Team	Apps	(Gls)
- Juventus
- Palmeiras

International career^{‡}
- Brazil
- * Club domestic league appearances and goals ‡ National team caps and goals as of 20 September 2003 (before the 2003 FIFA Women's World Cup)

Giselle Pereira de Vasconcellos (born 20 November 1983), commonly known as Giselle, is a Brazilian women's international footballer who plays as a goalkeeper. She is a member of the Brazil women's national football team. She was a non-playing squad member at the 2003 FIFA Women's World Cup.

== International career ==
Giselle was part of the Brazil under-20 selection at the FIFA U-20 Women's World Championships in 2002.

In July 2003, Giselle played for the senior Brazil women's national football team in two friendly games against Canada.
