= Amy Beattie =

Australian soccer player

Personal information
- Date of birth: 8 September 1980 (age 46)
- Position: Goalkeeper

International career^{‡}
Years	Team	Apps	(Gls)
- Australia
- ‡ National team caps and goals as of 20 September 2003 (before the 2003 FIFA Women's World Cup)

Amy Beattie (born 8 September 1980) is an Australian women's international footballer who plays as a goalkeeper. She is a member of the Australia women's national football team. She was part of the team at the 2003 FIFA Women's World Cup.
