= Adela Medina =

Argentine footballer (born 1978)

Personal information
- Date of birth: 3 November 1978 (age 47)
- Position: Defender

International career^{‡}
Years	Team	Apps	(Gls)
- Argentina
- ‡ National team caps and goals as of 20 September 2003 (before the 2003 FIFA Women's World Cup)

Adela Medina (born 3 November 1978) is an Argentine footballer who played as a defender for the Argentina women's national football team. She was part of the team at the 2003 FIFA Women's World Cup.
