= Kim Kyul-sil =

South Korean footballer (born 1982)

Personal information
- Date of birth: 13 April 1982 (age 44)
- Position: Midfielder

Senior career*
Years	Team	Apps	(Gls)
2000-2001	Soongmin Wonders		
2003-2004	Yeoju Institute of Tech.		
2005-2011	Incheon Hyundai Steel		
2012	Suwon FMC		

International career^{‡}
1998-2008	South Korea	35	(1)
- * Club domestic league appearances and goals ‡ National team caps and goals as of 00:50, 21 April 2026 (UTC)

- Kim Kyul-sil
- Hangul: 김결실
- RR: Gim Gyeolsil
- MR: Kim Kyŏlsil

Kim Kyul-sil (Korean: 김결실, born 13 April 1982) is a South Korean retired footballer who played as a midfielder or defender. She was a member of the South Korea women's national football team. She was part of the team at the 2003 FIFA Women's World Cup.

== Early life ==
Kim started playing football in her first year at Seolbong Middle School in Yeoju.

== Club career ==
Having gained attention as a high schooler playing for the national team, Kim joined Soongmin Wonders in 2000, but after sustaining injuries to both ankles the following year, she was left unable to play and considered retiring from the sport. However, she underwent surgery and rehabilitation and began playing for Yeoju Institute of Technology in 2003.

After graduating from college, Kim joined Incheon Hyundai Steel. She scored in the final of the 2005 KWFF Spring Championship to help Incheon win the tournament. Kim played in the inaugural season of the WK League, scoring a crucial goal in Round 17 to take Incheon into the championship final despite a knee injury earlier in the season that had taken her out of action and led to a dip in form for the club.

Kim played for Suwon FMC in the 2012 WK League season.

== International career ==
When Kim received her first national team call-up in 1997 at age 15, she was the youngest player ever to be named in the South Korean squad. After an absence from the national team during which she underwent surgery on both ankles, Kim returned to the squad ahead of the 2003 FIFA Women's World Cup. She scored her only international goal in a friendly match against Argentina during the build-up to the tournament.

Kim was a key member of the South Korean squad that won the 2005 EAFF East Asian Cup. On their way to winning the tournament the side recorded a symbolic first ever victory over North Korea. She went on to play at the 2006 Asian Games. Kim was part of South Korea's squad at the 2006 AFC Women's Asian Cup but was unable to play due to injury.

Kim was selected to play at the 2010 AFC Women's Asian Cup but withdrew from the squad due to her recovery from a fractured toe taking longer than expected.

== Style of play ==
Kim was known for her speed, dribbling, and powerful shooting ability. While at Incheon Hyundai she played as a defensive midfielder, but she also played at wingback for the national team. Later in her career, Kim played as a central defender, but was still known as one of the fastest players in the WK League.

== Career statistics ==
=== International ===
As of match played 28 April 2008

Appearances and goals by national team and year
National team	Year	Apps	Goals
South Korea	1998	1	0
South Korea	1999	9	0
South Korea	2000	2	0
South Korea	2003	7	1
South Korea	2005	4	0
South Korea	2006	4	0
South Korea	2007	6	0
South Korea	2008	2	0
Total		59	5

Scores and results list South Korea's goal tally first, score column indicates score after each Kim Kyul-sil goal.

List of international goals scored by Kim Kyul-sil
No.	Date	Venue	Opponent	Score	Result	Competition	Ref.
1	13 September 2003	Veterans Memorial Stadium, Long Beach, U.S.A.	Argentina	1–0	2–1	Friendly	

== Honours ==
=== Incheon Hyundai Steel ===
- KWFF Spring Championship
  - Champions: 2005
  - Runners-up: 2008
- WK League
  - Runners-up: 2009, 2010, 2011

=== South Korea ===
- EAFF E-1 Football Championship
  - Champions: 2005
