= Frida Nordin =

Swedish football midfielder (born 1982)

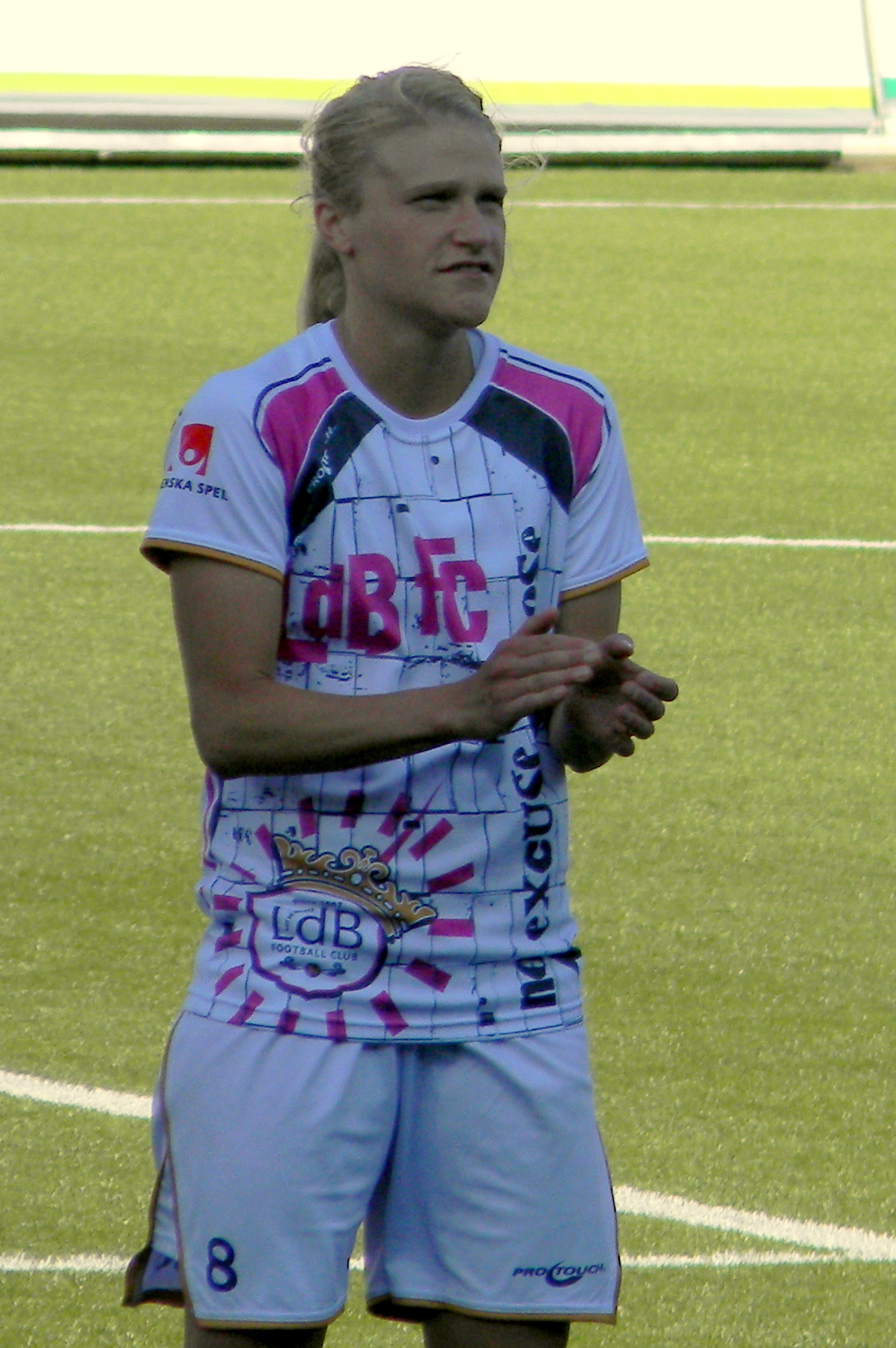

Personal information
- Full name: Frida Nordin
- Date of birth: 23 May 1982 (age 44)
- Place of birth: Växjö, Sweden
- Height: 1.63 m (5 ft 4 in)
- Position: Midfielder

Youth career
- Hovshaga AIF

Senior career*
Years	Team	Apps	(Gls)
1995–1997	Alvesta GoIF		
1998–2001	Östers IF		
2002–2013	LdB FC Malmö		
2013	IF Limhamn Bunkeflo		

International career
2001–2008	Sweden	40	(3)
- * Club domestic league appearances and goals

Frida Nordin (born 23 May 1982) is a Swedish football midfielder who played for IF Limhamn Bunkeflo in the Elitettan. She first played in the UEFA Women's Cup in 2004.

Since 2001 Nordin has been a member of the Swedish national team. She was included in the silver medal-winning 2003 World Cup squad, while she missed the 2007 World Cup due to an injury.

In May 2013 Nordin returned to action for Malmö after a year out with an anterior cruciate ligament injury, but just two months later she departed for another Malmö-based club, Limhamn Bunkeflo.
