= Elena Denchtchik =

Russian footballer (born 1973)

Personal information
- Date of birth: 11 November 1973 (age 52)
- Position: Midfielder

Senior career*
Years	Team	Apps	(Gls)
2011–2012	Mordovochka Saransk	25	(0)

International career^{‡}
	Russia	2	(0)
- * Club domestic league appearances and goals ‡ National team caps and goals as of 4 October 2003

Elena Denchtchik (born 11 November 1973) is a former Russian women's international footballer who played as a midfielder. She was a member of the Russia women's national football team. She was part of the team at the 2003 FIFA Women's World Cup.
