= Ri Jong-hui =

North Korean footballer

Personal information
- Date of birth: 20 August 1975 (age 51)
- Position: Goalkeeper

International career^{‡}
Years	Team	Apps	(Gls)
	North Korea	3	(0)
- ‡ National team caps and goals as of 29 September 2003

- Ri Jong-hui
- Hangul: 리정희
- RR: Ri Jeonghui
- MR: Ri Chŏnghŭi

Ri Jong-hui (born 20 August 1975) is a North Korean women's international footballer who plays as a goalkeeper. She is a member of the North Korea women's national football team. She was part of the team at the 1999 FIFA Women's World Cup and 2003 FIFA Women's World Cup.
