= Jon Hye-yong =

North Korean footballer (born 1977)

Personal information
- Date of birth: 16 February 1977 (age 49)
- Position: Defender

International career^{‡}
Years	Team	Apps	(Gls)
	North Korea	3	(0)
- ‡ National team caps and goals as of 29 September 2003

Jon Hye-yong (Korean: 전혜영; born 16 February 1977) is a North Korean women's international footballer who plays as a defender. She is a member of the North Korea women's national football team. She was part of the team at the 2003 FIFA Women's World Cup.
