= Park Hae-jung (footballer) =

South Korean association football player

Personal information
- Date of birth: 10 March 1977 (age 49)
- Position: Defender

Senior career*
Years	Team	Apps	(Gls)
- INI Steel

International career^{‡}
1996-2003	South Korea	21	(0)
- * Club domestic league appearances and goals ‡ National team caps and goals as of 03:45, 16 March 2026 (UTC)

Park Hae-jung (born 10 March 1977) is a retired South Korean international football defender who played for the South Korea women's national football team. She was part of the South Korean team at the 2003 FIFA Women's World Cup. At club level, she played for INI Steel in South Korea.
