= Precious Dede =

Nigerian footballer

Personal information
- Full name: Precious Uzoaru Dede
- Date of birth: 18 January 1980 (age 46)
- Place of birth: Lagos, Nigeria
- Height: 1.70 m (5 ft 7 in)
- Position: Goalkeeper

Senior career*
Years	Team	Apps	(Gls)
????-2008	Delta Queens		
2009	Arna-Bjørnar	16	(0)
2010	Delta Queens		
2012	Rivers Angels		
2013	Bayelsa Queens		

International career^{‡}
2003–2016	Nigeria	99	(0)
- * Club domestic league appearances and goals as of 11:33, 29 June 2015 (UTC) ‡ National team caps and goals as of 15:46, 17 June 2015 (UTC)

Precious Uzoaru Dede (born 18 January 1980) is a Nigerian retired footballer who played as a goalkeeper for the women's national football team. She formerly played for several clubs, including Delta Queens FC, Ibom Queens and Arna-Bjørnar, as well as appearing 99 times for the Nigeria women's national football team.

== Club career ==
On 30 March 2009 Dede signed a one-year contract to play for Arna-Bjørnar in Bergen, Norway. She had been brought in following an injury to fellow goalkeeper Erika Skarbø.

== International career ==
Dede has been in many Nigerian squads over the years, including the Women's World Cup tournaments of 2003, 2007, 2011, 2015, the Olympic tournaments of Sydney 2000, Athens 2004 and Beijing 2008, and the African Women's Championship tournaments of 2008, 2010, 2012 and 2014, winning it twice (2010, 2014).

=== Retirement ===
She had initially considered retiring from international football following the 2014 African Women's Championship, but was convinced to continue playing through the 2015 World Cup. Following the tournament, she announced her retirement in March 2016, having played 99 games for the senior national team. At the time of her retirement, she had been the longest serving player for the squad, and had recently been dropped from the team for the qualification tournament for the 2016 Summer Olympics.

She decided to fully retire from professional football in October that year, saying "I cherish the opportunity to play at club level and represent my country, it was a dream come true. I am very grateful to have spent over a decade in female football, I owe so much to the best game in the world."

== Honours ==
=== International ===
Nigeria

- African Women's Championship (2): 2010, 2014
