= 2025 CAF Women's Champions League WAFU Zone B Qualifiers =

Tournament details
- Host country: Ivory Coast
- City: Yamoussoukro
- Dates: 23 August-4 September
- Teams: 7 (from 7 associations)
- Venues: 2 (in 2 host cities)

Final positions
- Champions: (Ivory Coast) ASEC Mimosas (1st title)
- Runners-up: (Nigeria) Bayelsa Queens
- Third place: (Burkina Faso) USFA
- Fourth place: (Ghana) Police Ladies

Tournament statistics
- Matches played: 13
- Goals scored: 36 (2.77 per match)
- Top scorer: multiple player (3goals)
- All statistics correct as of 5 September 2025.

The 2025 CAF Women's Champions League WAFU Zone B Qualifiers is the 5th edition of the CAF Women's Champions League WAFU Zone B Qualifiers organized by the WAFU for the women's clubs of association nations. This edition will be held in Yamoussoukro, Ivory Coast from 23 August to 4 September 2025.

The tournament winners qualified automatically for the 2025 CAF Women's Champions League final tournament

== Participating clubs ==
Team	Qualifying method	Appearances	Previous best performance
(Ivory Coast) ASEC Mimosas	2024–25 Ivory Coast Women's Championship Champions	1st	n/a
(Benin) Sam Nelly FC	2024–25 Benin Women's Championship Champions	2nd	4th(2025)
(Ghana) Police Ladies FC	2024–25 Ghana Women's Premier League Champions	1st	n/a
(Niger) AS GNN	2023–24 Niger Women's Championship Champions	2nd	Groupe-stage (2025)
(Burkina Faso) USFA	2024–25 Burkinabé Women's Championship Champions	4th	4th(2021)
(Togo) ASKO Kara	2024–25 Togolese Women's Championship Champions	2nd	Groupe-stage (2025)
(Nigeria) Bayelsa Queens FC	2024–25 NWFL Premiership Champions	2nd	Champion(2022)

== Venues ==
2025 CAF Women's Champions League WAFU Zone B Qualifiers is located in Ivory Coast	Yamoussoukro
2025 CAF Women's Champions League WAFU Zone B Qualifiers is located in Ivory Coast	Charles Konan Banny Stadium
2025 CAF Women's Champions League WAFU Zone B Qualifiers is located in Ivory Coast	Capacity: 20,000

== Draw ==
The draw for this edition of the tournament was held on 14 August 2025 at 10:00 UTC+0 in Abidjan,Ivory Coast at the CAF WEST ZONE B headquarters. The seven teams were drawn into 2 groups with teams finishing first and second in the groups qualifying for the knockout stages.

== Match officials ==
The following match officials were selected for the tournament.

=== Referees ===
- (Benin) Béatrice Gouchoedou
- (Burkina Faso) Jacqueline Nikiéma
- (Ivory Coast) Natacha Konan
- (Ghana) Rita Boateng-Nkansah
- (Niger) Zouwaira Souley Sani
- (Nigeria) Alaba Olufunmilayo
- (Tanzania) Tatu Malogo
- (Togo) Edoh Kindedji

=== Assistant referees ===
- (Benin) Sonia Louis
- (Burkina Faso) Ami Kouma
- (Ivory Coast) Ndeko Appia
- (Ghana) Patricia Kyeraa
- (Mali) Kadidia Dicko
- (Niger) Sakina Hamidou Alfa
- (Nigeria) Faith Agbons
- (Togo) Kossiwa Awoutey

== Group stage ==
Tiebreakers

Teams are ranked according to points (3 points for a win, 1 point for a draw, 0 points for a loss), and if tied on points, the following tiebreaking criteria are applied, in the order given, to determine the rankings.

1. Points in head-to-head matches among tied teams;
2. Goal difference in head-to-head matches among tied teams;
3. Goals scored in head-to-head matches among tied teams;
4. If more than two teams are tied, and after applying all head-to-head criteria above, a subset of teams are still tied, all head-to-head criteria above are reapplied exclusively to this subset of teams;
5. Goal difference in all group matches;
6. Goals scored in all group matches;
7. Penalty shoot-out if only two teams are tied and they met in the last round of the group;
8. Disciplinary points (yellow card = 1 point, red card as a result of two yellow cards = 3 points, direct red card = 3 points, yellow card followed by direct red card = 4 points);
9. Drawing of lots.

=== Group A ===
Pos	Team	Pld	W	D	L	GF	GA	GD	Pts	Qualification
1	(Ivory Coast) ASEC Mimosas (H)	2	2	0	0	5	1	+4	6	Semi-finals
2	(Burkina Faso) USFA	2	1	0	1	1	3	−2	3	Semi-finals
3	(Niger) AS GNN	2	0	0	2	1	3	−2	0	

Source: WAFU B
(H) Hosts
23 August 2025
15:00

ASEC Mimosas (Ivory Coast)	2–1	(Niger) AS GNN
Ouédraogo 21', 90'	Report	Moussa 31'

Charles Konan Banny Stadium, Yamoussoukro
Referee: Edoh Kindedji (Togo)

26 August 2025
15:00

AS GNN (Niger)	0–1	(Burkina Faso) USFA
	Report	Kouanda 89'

Charles Konan Banny Stadium, Yamoussoukro

29 August 2025
15:00

USFA (Burkina Faso)	0–3	(Ivory Coast) ASEC Mimosas
	Report	Diallo 22'; Brou 77'; Dagba 90'

Charles Konan Banny Stadium, Yamoussoukro
Referee: Alaba Olufunmilayo (Nigeria)

=== Group B ===
Pos	Team	Pld	W	D	L	GF	GA	GD	Pts	Qualification
1	(Nigeria) Bayelsa Queens	3	3	0	0	9	2	+7	9	Semi-finals
2	(Ghana) Police Ladies	3	2	0	1	7	4	+3	6	Semi-finals
3	(Benin) Sam Nelly	3	1	0	2	3	7	−4	3	
4	(Togo) ASKO Kara	3	0	0	3	1	7	−6	0	

Source: WAFU B
24 August 2025
15:00

Bayelsa Queens (Nigeria)	2–1	(Ghana) Police Ladies
Moshood 12'; Essien 62'	Report	Berko 67'

Charles Konan Banny Stadium, Yamoussoukro
24 August 2025
18:00

ASKO Kara (Togo)	0–1	(Benin) Sam Nelly
	Report	Gandonou 34'

Charles Konan Banny Stadium, Yamoussoukro

27 August 2025
15:00

ASKO Kara (Togo)	0–3	(Nigeria) Bayelsa Queens
	Report	Bani 46' (o.g.); Olabiyi 55'; Moshood 88'

Charles Konan Banny Stadium, Yamoussoukro
Referee: Béatrice Gouchoedou (Benin)
27 August 2025
18:00

Police Ladies (Ghana)	3–1	(Benin) Sam Nelly
Animah 14' (pen.); Nyarkoh 25'; Afriyie 68'		Gandonou 81'

Charles Konan Banny Stadium, Yamoussoukro
Referee: Tatu Malogo (Tanzania)

30 August 2025
15:00

Police Ladies (Ghana)	3–1	(Togo) ASKO Kara
Afriyie 23'; Amponsah 45+1'; Animah 78'	Report	Koudjou 66'

Charles Konan Banny Stadium, Yamoussoukro
30 August 2025
15:00

Sam Nelly (Benin)	1–4	(Nigeria) Bayelsa Queens
Favour 44'	Report	Akekoromowei 14'; Moshood 35'; Olabiyi 55'; Akekoromowei 59'

Charles Konan Banny Stadium, Yamoussoukro

== Knockout stage ==
=== Bracket ===
Semi-finals
2 September – Yamoussoukro
(Ivory Coast) ASEC Mimosas	4
(Ghana) Police Ladies	1
2 September – Yamoussoukro
(Nigeria) Bayelsa Queens	2
(Burkina Faso) USFA	1

Final
5 September – Yamoussoukro
(Ivory Coast) ASEC Mimosas (p)	1 (8)
(Nigeria) Bayelsa Queens	1 (7)
Third place
5 September – Yamoussoukro
(Ghana) Police Ladies	0 (4)
(Burkina Faso) USFA (p)	0 (5)

=== Semi-finals ===
2 September 2025
15:00

ASEC Mimosas (Ivory Coast)	4–1	(Ghana) Police Ladies
Diallo 44'; Dagba 47'; Ouédraogo 54'; N'Guessan 68' (pen.)	Report	Nyarko 56'

Charles Konan Banny Stadium, Yamoussoukro
Referee: Tatu Malogo (Tanzania)

2 September 2025
19:00

Bayelsa Queens (Nigeria)	2–1	(Burkina Faso) USFA
Essien 15'; Akekoromowei 63'	Report	Yeboah 2'

Charles Konan Banny Stadium, Yamoussoukro
Referee: Kindedji Edoh (Togo)

=== 3rd Place ===
5 September 2025
15:00

Police Ladies (Ghana)	0–0	(Burkina Faso) USFA
Penalties
	4–5

Charles Konan Banny Stadium, Yamoussoukro
Referee: (Ivory Coast) Natacha Konan

=== Final ===
5 September 2025
19:00

ASEC Mimosas (Ivory Coast)	1–1 (a.e.t.)	(Nigeria) Bayelsa Queens
Diallo 5'	Report	Essien 18'
Penalties
	8–7

Charles Konan Banny Stadium, Yamoussoukro
Referee: (Niger) Zouwaira Souley Sani

== Awards and statistics ==
=== Goalscorers ===
There have been 36 goals scored in 13 matches, for an average of 2.77 goals per match (as of 5 September 2025).

Rank	Player	Team	Goals
1	(Nigeria) Shakirat Moshood	(Nigeria) Bayelsa Queens	3
1	(Ivory Coast) Habibou Ouédraogo	(Ivory Coast) ASEC Mimosas	3
1	(Nigeria) Janet Akekoromowei	(Nigeria) Bayelsa Queens	3
1	(Nigeria) Emem Essien	(Nigeria) Bayelsa Queens	3
1	(Ivory Coast) Ami Diallo	(Ivory Coast) ASEC Mimosas	3
6	(Benin) Romaine Gandonou	(Benin) Sam Nelly	2
6	(Ghana) Grace Animah	(Ghana) Police Ladies	2
6	(Ghana) Deborah Afriyie	(Ghana) Police Ladies	2
6	(Nigeria) Alaba Olabiyi	(Nigeria) Bayelsa Queens	2
6	(Ivory Coast) Essi Dagba	(Ivory Coast) ASEC Mimosas	2
6	(Ghana) Sarah Nyarkoh	(Ghana) Police Ladies	2
12	(Niger) Rahina Moussa	(Niger) AS GNN	1
12	(Benin) Kalu Favour	(Benin) Sam Nelly	1
12	(Ivory Coast) Sopie Brou	(Ivory Coast) ASEC Mimosas	1
12	(Ivory Coast) Nadège N'Guessan	(Ivory Coast) ASEC Mimosas	1
12	(Burkina Faso) Salamata Kouanda	(Burkina Faso) USFA	1
12	(Burkina Faso) Comfort Yeboah	(Burkina Faso) USFA	1
12	(Ghana) Mary Berko	(Ghana) Police Ladies	1
12	(Ghana) Mary Amponsah	(Ghana) Police Ladies	1
12	(Togo) Afi Koudjou	(Togo) ASKO Kara	1

=== Own goals ===
Rank	Player	Team	Goals
1	(Togo) Oumou Bani	(Togo) ASKO Kara	1
