= CAF Women's Champions League WAFU Zone B =

WAFU B Women's Champions League
- Organiser(s): WAFU
- Founded: 2021; 5 years ago
- Region: West Africa
- Teams: 7
- Current champions: (Ghana) Ampem Darkoa (2nd title)
- Most championships: (Ghana) Ampem Darkoa (2 titles)
- Broadcaster: CAF TV
- 2026 edition

The CAF Women's Champions League WAFU Zone B, is an annual qualification tournament for the CAF Women's Champions League organized by WAFU for its WAFU B member nations.

== History ==
In 2020, CAF announced the launch of the CAF Women's Champions League with each of the six sub confederations to hold qualifiers with the winners to represent them at the main tournament.

The 2025 edition of the qualifiers was held from 23 August to 5 September at the Charles Konan Banny Stadium in the Ivory Coast.

== Results ==
Season	Champions	Score	Runners-up	Ref.
2021	(Ghana) Hasaacas Ladies	3–1	(Nigeria) Rivers Angels	
2022	(Nigeria) Bayelsa Queens	3–0	(Ghana) Ampem Darkoa Ladies	
2023	(Ghana) Ampem Darkoa Ladies	1–0	(Nigeria) Delta Queens	
2024	(Nigeria) Edo Queens	3–0	(Benin) Ainonvi	
2025	(Ivory Coast) ASEC Mimosas (women)	1–1 (8–7 p)	(Nigeria) Bayelsa Queens	
2026	(Ghana) Ampem Darkoa Ladies	3–2 (a.e.t.) (Note: Edo Queens were initially declared winners after a 4–1 penalty shootout victory in the final. However, following a protest by Ampem Darkoa regarding the officials' decision not to play extra time before the shootout, the extra time was subsequently played. Ampem Darkoa won the replay.)	(Nigeria) Edo Queens	

== Performances ==
=== By teams ===
Performance of CAF Women's Champions League WAFU Zone B by club
Club	Titles	Runners-up	Seasons won	Seasons runners-up
(Ghana) Ampem Darkoa Ladies	2	1	2023, 2026	2022
(Nigeria) Edo Queens	1	1	2024	2026
(Nigeria) Bayelsa Queens	1	1	2022	2025
(Ghana) Hasaacas Ladies	1	0	2021	
(Ivory Coast) ASEC Mimosas (women)	1	0	2025	
(Nigeria) Rivers Angels	0	1		2021
(Nigeria) Delta Queens	0	1		2023
(Benin) Ainonvi	0	1		2024

=== Performance by nation ===
After the 2026 edition. So far only Nigerien teams have not reached a semi-final.

Nation	Winners	Runners-up	Third	Fourth	Winner	Runners-up	Third place	Fourth place
Ghana	3	1	—	1	Hasaacas Ladies; Ampem Darkoa Ladies (2)	Ampem Darkoa Ladies		Police Ladies
Nigeria	2	4	—	—	Edo Queens; Bayelsa Queens	Rivers Angels; Delta Queens; Bayelsa Queens; Edo Queens		
Ivory Coast	1	—	3	—	ASEC Mimosas (women)		Africa Sports (women); Athlético FC d'Abidjan; FC Inter d'Abidjan	
Benin	—	1	—	3		Ainonvi		Espoir FC (women); Sam Nelly FC; Dynamique FC
Burkina Faso	—	—	2	2			USFA (2)	USFA; AO Etincelle
Togo	—	—	1	—			AS OTR Lomé	

== Records and statistics ==
Tournament	Golden Boot	Goals	Ref
2021	(Nigeria) Maryann Ezenagu	5	
2022	(Nigeria) Edidiong Etim	6	
2023	(Ghana) Mary Amponsah	8	
2024	(Nigeria) Emem Essien	6	
2025	(Nigeria) Shakirat Moshood (Ivory Coast) Habibou Ouédraogo (Nigeria) Janet Akekoromowei (Nigeria) Emem Essien (Ivory Coast) Ami Diallo	3	
2026	(Nigeria) Doosuur Atume	5	
