= 2026 CAF Women's Champions League WAFU Zone B Qualifiers =

Tournament details
- Host country: Burkina Faso
- Dates: 23 August–5 September
- Teams: 7 (from 7 associations)

Final positions
- Champions: (Ghana) Ampem Darkoa Ladies (2nd title)
- Runners-up: (Nigeria) Edo Queens
- Third place: (Burkina Faso) USFA
- Fourth place: (Benin) Dynamique FC

Tournament statistics
- Matches played: 13
- Goals scored: 54 (4.15 per match)
- Top scorer: (Nigeria) Doosuur Atume (5 goals)
- Best player: (Nigeria) Oluwakemi Adegbuyi
- Best goalkeeper: (Ghana) Rose Teye Baah
- All statistics correct as of 29 October 2026.

The 2026 CAF Women's Champions League WAFU Zone B Qualifiers was the 6th edition of the CAF Women's Champions League WAFU Zone B Qualifiers organized by the WAFU for the women's clubs of association nations. This edition was held in Burkina Faso from 23 August to 5 September 2026, with the final completed on 29 October in Egypt.

Ampem Darkoa Ladies were the champions, winning their second CAF Women's Champions League WAFU Zone B title after defeating Edo Queens after extra time in the final. Edo Queens were initially the winners after winning on penalty shootout however Ampem Darkoa protested to CAF, stating that in contradiction to competition regulations, extra time was not played. CAF annulled the penalty shootout win and ordered the game to resume with extra time, after which Ampem Darkoa won. As winners, Ampem Darkoa also qualified for the 2026 CAF Women's Champions League.

== Participating clubs ==
Association	Team	Qualifying method	Appearances	Previous best performance
Benin	Dynamique FC	2025–26 Benin Women's Championship Champions	1st	Debut
Burkina Faso	USFA	2025–26 Burkinabé Women's Championship Champions	5th	Third place (2025)
Ghana	Ampem Darkoa	2025–26 Ghana Women's Premier League Champions	3rd	Champions (2023)
Ivory Coast	ASEC Mimosas	2025–26 Ivory Coast Women's Championship Champions	2nd	Champions (2025)
Niger	AS GNN	2025–26 Niger Women's Championship Champions	3rd	Group stage (2024, 2025)
Nigeria	Edo Queens	2025–26 NWFL Premiership Champions	2nd	Champions (2024)
Togo	ASKO Kara	2025–26 Togolese Women's Championship Champions	3rd	Group stage (2024, 2025)

== Venues ==
All matches will be played in Ouagadougou, Burkina Faso.

City	Venue	Capacity
Ouagadougou	Stade du 4 Août	29,800

== Group stage ==
Tiebreakers

Teams are ranked according to points (3 points for a win, 1 point for a draw, 0 points for a loss), and if tied on points, the following tiebreaking criteria are applied, in the order given, to determine the rankings.

1. Points in head-to-head matches among tied teams;
2. Goal difference in head-to-head matches among tied teams;
3. Goals scored in head-to-head matches among tied teams;
4. If more than two teams are tied, and after applying all head-to-head criteria above, a subset of teams are still tied, all head-to-head criteria above are reapplied exclusively to this subset of teams;
5. Goal difference in all group matches;
6. Goals scored in all group matches;
7. Penalty shoot-out if only two teams are tied and they met in the last round of the group;
8. Disciplinary points (yellow card = 1 point, red card as a result of two yellow cards = 3 points, direct red card = 3 points, yellow card followed by direct red card = 4 points);
9. Drawing of lots.

=== Group A ===
Pos	Team	Pld	W	D	L	GF	GA	GD	Pts	Qualification
1	(Burkina Faso) USFA (H)	2	2	0	0	8	0	+8	6	Semi-finals
2	(Benin) Dynamique	2	0	1	1	0	3	−3	1	Semi-finals
3	(Togo) ASKO	2	0	1	1	0	5	−5	1	

Source: CAF Zone Ouest B
Rules for classification: Tiebreakers
(H) Hosts
23 August 2026
16:00

USFA (Burkina Faso)	3–0	(Benin) Dynamique
Nako 54'; Guira 72'; Sow 87'

Stade du 4 Août, Ouagadougou

26 August 2026
16:00

Dynamique (Benin)	0–0	(Togo) ASKO

Stade du 4 Août, Ouagadougou

29 August 2026
16:00

ASKO (Togo)	0–5	(Burkina Faso) USFA
		Yeboah 5', 20'; Sow 26'; Nana 41'; Guira 54'

Stade du 4 Août, Ouagadougou

=== Group B ===
Pos	Team	Pld	W	D	L	GF	GA	GD	Pts	Qualification
1	(Ghana) Ampem Darkoa Ladies	3	3	0	0	7	1	+6	9	Semi-finals
2	(Nigeria) Edo Queens	3	2	0	1	11	3	+8	6	Semi-finals
3	(Ivory Coast) ASEC Mimosas	3	1	0	2	6	4	+2	3	
4	(Niger) AS GNN	3	0	0	3	0	16	−16	0	

Source: CAF Zone Ouest B
Rules for classification: Tiebreakers
24 August 2026
15:00

ASEC Mimosas (Ivory Coast)	0–1	(Ghana) Ampem Darkoa Ladies
		Adomako 29'

Stade du 4 Août, Ouagadougou
24 August 2026
18:00

Edo Queens (Nigeria)	7–0	(Niger) AS GNN
Moses 5', 45+5', 75'; Atume 46', 56'; Folorunsho 62'; Adegbuyi 90+3'

Stade du 4 Août, Ouagadougou

27 August 2026
15:00

Edo Queens (Nigeria)	3–1	(Ivory Coast) ASEC Mimosas
Adegbuyi 23'; Tarnum 41'; Umejiaku 89'		Touré 83'

Stade du 4 Août, Ouagadougou
27 August 2026
18:00

Ampem Darkoa Ladies (Ghana)	4–0	(Niger) AS GNN
Amoh 23'; Pokuaa 39'; Adjei 81'; Okyere 90+1'

Stade du 4 Août, Ouagadougou

30 August 2026
16:00

Ampem Darkoa Ladies (Ghana)	2–1	(Nigeria) Edo Queens
Assemani 46'; Pokuaa 78'		Atume 11'

Terrain Focus Sports, Ouagadougou
Referee: Laurande Offin (Benin)
30 August 2026
16:00

AS GNN (Niger)	0–5	(Ivory Coast) ASEC Mimosas
		Kayaba 36', 55', 61'; Gnounoué 45+1'; Brou 90+1'

Stade du 4 Août, Ouagadougou
Referee: Rejoice Addokwei (Ghana)

== Knockout stage ==
=== Bracket ===
Semi-finals
2 September – Ouagadougou
(Burkina Faso) USFA	1
(Nigeria) Edo Queens	5
2 September – Ouagadougou
(Ghana) Ampem Darkoa Ladies	4
(Benin) Dynamique	1

Final
5 September/29 October (Note: The match initially ended 2–2 after regulation time on 5 September with Edo Queens winning 4–1 on penalties. However Ampem Darkoa filed a formal protest to CAF claiming that extra time was not played in violation to the competition's regulations and demanded the final to be replayed. CAF admitted that indeed the match went against the regulations due to an administrative error, annulled the penalty shootout result and ordered the game to resume with extra time. The match resumed on 29 October in Cairo and was eventually won by Ampem Darkoa after extra time.) – Ouagadougou/Cairo
(Ghana) Ampem Darkoa Ladies (a.e.t.)	3
(Nigeria) Edo Queens	2
Third place
5 September – Ouagadougou
(Burkina Faso) USFA	4
(Benin) Dynamique	1

=== Semi-finals ===
2 September 2026
16:00

USFA (Burkina Faso)	1–5	(Nigeria) Edo Queens
Beremwidougou 90+3'		Atume 17'; Moses 43'; Uroko 45+3'; Tarnum 47'; Folorunso 63'

Stade du 4 Août, Ouagadougou
Referee: Vistoria Shangula (Namibia)

2 September 2026
19:00

Ampem Darkoa Ladies (Ghana)	4–1	(Benin) Dynamique
Pokuaa 17', 66'; Assemani 28'; Ameaa 38'		Anagha 47'

Stade du 4 Août, Ouagadougou
Referee: Odilone Ehui (Ivory Coast)

=== Third place ===
5 September 2026
16:00

USFA (Burkina Faso)	4–1	(Benin) Dynamique
Sow 6', 78'; Beremwidougou 29'; Guira 84'		Anagha 8'

Stade du 4 Août, Ouagadougou

=== Final ===
5 September 2026
19:00

Edo Queens (Nigeria)	2–3 (a.e.t.)	(Ghana) Ampem Darkoa Ladies
Atume 4'; Umejiaku 90+4'		Nyarkoh 2', 74'; Mohammed 92'

Stade du 4 Août, Ouagadougou

== Top goalscorers ==
There were 53 goals scored in 13 matches, for an average of 4.08 goals per match.

Rank	Player	Team	Goals
1	(Nigeria) Doosuur Atume	(Nigeria) Edo Queens	5
2	(Nigeria) Chioma Moses	(Nigeria) Edo Queens	4
2	(Burkina Faso) Stéphanie Sow	(Burkina Faso) USFA	4
4	(Togo) Tatiana Kayaba	(Ivory Coast) ASEC Mimosas	3
4	(Ghana) Millot Abena Pokuaa	(Ghana) Ampem Darkoa	3
4	(Burkina Faso) Déborah Guira	(Burkina Faso) USFA	3
