= 2023 CAF Women's Champions League qualification =

Qualification phase for the 2023 CAF Women's Champions League

Tournament details
- Host countries: Egypt (North Zone); Liberia (West A Zone); Nigeria (West B Zone); Equatorial Guinea (Central Zone); Uganda (Central-East Zone); South Africa (South Zone)
- Dates: 5 August – 14 September 2023

Tournament statistics
- Matches played: 61
- Goals scored: 198 (3.25 per match)

Qualification for the 2023 CAF Women's Champions League began on 5 August and concluded on 14 September 2023.

Qualification was made up of 6 sub-confederation qualifying tournaments which commenced on 12 August within COSAFA for Southern Africa and the CECAFA for mostly East Africa and a bit of Central Africa. Qualification ended on 14 September with the participating teams reduced to the final 8 which consisted of one winning team each from the 6 CAF sub-confederations (WAFU is split into two zones), the tournament's defending champions and the host nation's league-winning team. These 8 teams would proceed to the main tournament phases currently being held in Ivory Coast.

== Teams ==
All participating teams qualified for the qualification phase via winning their respective national league titles and had their club licensing applications accepted by CAF. A total of 34 (out of 54) countries have a participant club in this edition.

Qualified teams for the 2023 CAF Women's Champions League qualification phase
Zones		Teams			
UNAF		(Algeria) Afak Relizane (3rd)	(Egypt) Wadi Degla (3rd)	(Morocco) SC Casablanca (1st)	(Tunisia) ASF Sousse (1st)
WAFU	A	(Liberia) Determine Girls (3rd)	(Mali) AS Mandé (3rd)	(Senegal) AS Dakar Sacré-Cœur (1st)	(Sierra Leone) Mogbwemo Queens (1st)
WAFU	B	(Burkina Faso) US Forces Armées (3rd)	(Ivory Coast) Athlético F.C. d'Abidjan (2nd)	(Ghana) Ampem Darkoa (2nd)	
WAFU	B	(Nigeria) Delta Queens (1st)	(Togo) Academie Amis du Monde (2nd)	(Benin) Sam Nelly (1st)	
UNIFFAC		(Republic of the Congo) AS Epah-Ngamba (1st)	(Equatorial Guinea) Huracanes (1st)	(Democratic Republic of the Congo) TP Mazembe (2nd)	
CECAFA		(Burundi) Buja Queens (1st)	(Djibouti) FAD Club (2nd)	(Ethiopia) CBE (3rd)	(Kenya) Vihiga Queens (2nd)
CECAFA		(Rwanda) AS Kigali (2nd)	(South Sudan) Yei Joint Stars (3rd)	(Tanzania) JKT Queens (1st)	(Uganda) Kampala Queens (1st)
CECAFA		(Zanzibar) New Generation FC (2nd)			
COSAFA		(Botswana) Double Action Ladies (3rd)	(Eswatini) Young Buffaloes (2nd)	(Comoros) Olympic de Moroni (2nd)	(Mozambique) CD Costa do Sol (2nd)
COSAFA		(South Africa) Mamelodi Sundowns (3rd)	(Zambia) Green Buffaloes (3rd)	Lesotho Defence Force Ladies (2nd)	(Malawi) Ntopwa FC (1st)

Associations which did not enter a team:

- Angola
- Central African Republic
- Cameroon (AS Awa withdrawn)
- Cape Verde
- Chad
- Eritrea
- Gabon
- Gambia
- Guinea
- Guinea-Bissau
- Libya
- Madagascar
- Mauritania
- Mauritius
- Namibia
- Niger (AS Police withdrawn)
- São Tomé and Príncipe
- Seychelles
- Somalia
- Sudan
- Zimbabwe

== Main Qualification Phase ==
=== UNAF ===
Pos	Team	Pld	W	D	L	GF	GA	GD	Pts	Qualification	SCC	AFR	WDG	ASFS
1	(Morocco) SC Casablanca	3	3	0	0	13	5	+8	9	Main tournament	—	4–3	6–1	
2	(Algeria) Afak Relizane	3	2	0	1	12	5	+7	6			—		
3	(Egypt) Wadi Degla (H)	3	1	0	2	7	13	−6	3			1–4	—	
4	(Tunisia) ASF Sousse	3	0	0	3	4	13	−9	0		1–3	0–5	3–5	—

Source: unafonline.org
(H) Hosts

=== WAFU Zone A ===
Pos	Team	Pld	W	D	L	GF	GA	GD	Pts	Qualification	ASM	ASD	DGF	MQFC
1	(Mali) AS Mandé	3	1	2	0	4	1	+3	5	Main tournament	—			
2	(Senegal) AS Dakar	3	1	2	0	3	2	+1	5		1–1	—	1–1	1–0
3	(Liberia) Determine Girls FC	3	1	1	1	3	5	−2	4		0–3		—	2–1
4	(Sierra Leone) Mogbwemo Queens	3	0	1	2	1	3	−2	1		0–0			—

=== WAFU Zone B ===
==== Group stage ====
===== Group A =====
Pos	Team	Pld	W	D	L	GF	GA	GD	Pts	Qualification	DQ	SN	USFA
1	(Nigeria) Delta Queens F.C.	2	2	0	0	5	0	+5	6	Semi-finals	—	2–0	
2	(Benin) Sam Nelly	2	0	1	1	0	2	−2	1	Semi-finals		—	0–0
3	(Burkina Faso) US Forces Armées	2	0	1	1	0	3	−3	1		0–3		—

===== Group B =====
Pos	Team	Pld	W	D	L	GF	GA	GD	Pts	Qualification	AD	AA	OTR
1	(Ghana) Ampem Darkoa	2	2	0	0	7	3	+4	6	Semi-finals	—		4–2
2	(Ivory Coast) Athlético FC d'Abidjan	2	1	0	1	3	3	0	3	Semi-finals	1–3	—	
3	(Togo) AS OTR Lomé	2	0	0	2	2	6	−4	0			0–2	—

==== Knockout stage ====
===== Semi-finals =====
Team 1	Score	Team 2
Delta Queens (Nigeria)	3–2	(Ivory Coast) Athlético d'Abidjan
Ampem Darkoa (Ghana)	4–1	(Benin) Sam Nelly

===== Third place =====
Team 1	Score	Team 2
Athlético d'Abidjan (Ivory Coast)	3–0	(Benin) Sam Nelly

===== Final =====
Team 1	Score	Team 2
Delta Queens (Nigeria)	0–1	(Ghana) Ampem Darkoa

=== UNIFFAC ===
Pos	Team	Pld	W	D	L	GF	GA	GD	Pts	Qualification	HFC	TPM	ASEN	ASA
1	(Equatorial Guinea) Huracanes	2	2	0	0	8	3	+5	6	Main tournament	—	3–2	5–1	
2	(Democratic Republic of the Congo) TP Mazembe	2	1	0	1	4	3	+1	3			—	2–0	
3	(Republic of the Congo) AS Epah-Ngamba	2	0	0	2	1	7	−6	0				—	
4	(Cameroon) AS Awa	0	0	0	0	0	0	0	0	Withdrew				—

=== CECAFA ===
==== Group stage ====
===== Group A =====
Pos	Team	Pld	W	D	L	GF	GA	GD	Pts	Qualification
1	(Ethiopia) CBE	4	3	1	0	15	2	+13	10	Semi-finals
2	(Burundi) Buja Queens	4	3	0	1	6	4	+2	9	Semi-finals
3	(Uganda) Kampala Queens	4	2	1	1	11	4	+7	7	
4	(South Sudan) Yei Joint Stars	4	1	0	3	2	8	−6	3	
5	(Djibouti) FAD Club	4	0	0	4	2	18	−16	0	

===== Group B =====
Pos	Team	Pld	W	D	L	GF	GA	GD	Pts	Qualification
1	(Tanzania) JKT Queens	3	3	0	0	4	1	+3	9	Semi-finals
2	(Kenya) Vihiga Queens FC	3	2	0	1	4	2	+2	6	Semi-finals
3	(Rwanda) AS Kigali WFC	3	1	0	2	3	3	0	3	
4	(Zanzibar) New Generation FC	3	0	0	3	1	6	−5	0	

==== Knockout stage ====
===== Semi-finals =====
Team 1	Score	Team 2
JKT Queens (Tanzania)	3–1	(Burundi) Buja Queens
CBE (Ethiopia)	2–1	(Kenya) Vihiga Queens F.C.

===== Third place =====
Team 1	Score	Team 2
Buja Queens (Burundi)	1–0	(Kenya) Vihiga Queens F.C.

===== Final =====
Team 1	Score	Team 2
CBE (Ethiopia)	0–0 (4–5 p)	(Tanzania) JKT Queens

=== COSAFA ===
==== Group stage ====
===== Group A =====
Pos	Team	Pld	W	D	L	GF	GA	GD	Pts	Qualification
1	(Botswana) Double Action Ladies	3	2	1	0	6	1	+5	7	Semi-finals
2	(Zambia) Green Buffaloes	3	2	1	0	4	2	+2	7	Semi-finals
3	Lesotho Defence Force Ladies	3	0	1	2	2	4	−2	1	
4	(Malawi) Ntopwa	3	0	1	2	1	6	−5	1	

Source: Group standings section in-page

===== Group B =====
Pos	Team	Pld	W	D	L	GF	GA	GD	Pts	Qualification
1	(South Africa) Mamelodi Sundowns	3	3	0	0	16	0	+16	9	Semi-finals
2	(Mozambique) CD Costa do Sol	3	2	0	1	4	6	−2	6	Semi-finals
3	(Eswatini) Young Buffaloes	3	0	1	2	4	9	−5	1	
4	(Comoros) Olympic de Moroni	3	0	1	2	4	13	−9	1	

Source: Group standings section in-page

==== Knockout stage ====
===== Semi-finals =====
Team 1	Score	Team 2
Double Action Ladies (Botswana)	2–0	(Mozambique) CD Costa do Sol
Mamelodi Sundowns (South Africa)	3–1	(Zambia) Green Buffaloes

===== Third place =====
Team 1	Score	Team 2
CD Costa do Sol (Mozambique)	2–1	(Zambia) Green Buffaloes

===== Final =====
Team 1	Score	Team 2
Double Action Ladies (Botswana)	0–2	(South Africa) Mamelodi Sundowns
