= Mavis Owusu =

Ghanaian footballer

Personal information
- Date of birth: 7 December 2003 (age 22)
- Place of birth: Ghana
- Height: 1.67 m (5 ft 6 in)
- Position: Forward

Team information
- Current team: Al Hilal
- Number: 15

Senior career*
Years	Team	Apps	(Gls)
2018–2023	Ampem Darkoa Ladies	+31	(+8)
2023–	Al Hilal	9	(4)

International career^{‡}
2017–2018	Ghana U17	4	(0)
2019–	Ghana	7	(2)
- * Club domestic league appearances and goals as of 30 December 2023 ‡ National team caps and goals as of 5 December 2023

Mavis Owusu (born 7 December 2003) is a Ghanaian professional footballer who plays as a forward for Saudi Women's Premier League club Al Hilal and the Ghana national team.

== Club career ==
=== Ampem Darkoa Ladies ===
Aged 15, Owusu was already playing for Ampem Darkoa Ladies for whom she played till 2023. She played a pivotal role in Ampem Darkoa recent success. reaching Ghana's Women's Special Competition final. alongside two Ghana's Malta Guinness women's premier league triumph as Ampem were crowned champions for two consecutive seasons. she scored three goals in Ampem second-place finishing in the 2022 CAF Women's Champions League WAFU Zone B Qualifiers.

=== Al Hilal ===
In October 2023, Owusu signed with Saudi side Al Hilal. On 13 October 2023, Owusu made her official debut for Al Hilal as a starter in a scoreless draw against Al Qadsiah. On 4 November 2023, She scored her first goal on a 4–0 win against Al-Riyadh.

== International career ==
Owusu was part of Ghana women's national under-17 football team for the 2018 FIFA U-17 Women's World Cup in Uruguay.

the year after at the age of 16, Owusu got her first call-up to the senior national team to participate 2019 WAFU Zone B Women's Cup in Ivory Coast. On 10 May 2019, she scored her first international goal against Togo.

== Career statistics ==
=== Club ===
As of match played 30 December 2023

Appearances and goals by club, season and competition
Club	Season	League			Cup		Continental		Other		Total	
Club	Season	Division	Apps	Goals	Apps	Goals	Apps	Goals	Apps	Goals	Apps	Goals
Ampem Darkoa Ladies	2022–23	GWPL	18	4	–	–	—		—		18	4
Ampem Darkoa Ladies	Total		18	4	–	–	—		—		18	4
Al Hilal	2023–24	SWPL	7	1	2	3	—		—		9	4
Al Hilal	Total		7	1	2	3	—		—		9	4

=== International ===
As of 11 April 2023

Ghana
Year	Apps	Goals
2019	7	2
2020	0	0
2021	0	0
2022	0	0
2023	0	0
Total	7	2

Scores and results list Ghana's goal tally first.

No.	Date	Venue	Opponent	Score	Result	Competition
1.	10 May 2019	Stade Robert Champroux, Abidjan, Ivory Coast	Togo	5–0	6–0	2019 WAFU Zone B Women's Cup
2.	10 May 2019	Stade Robert Champroux, Abidjan, Ivory Coast	Togo	6–0	6–0	2019 WAFU Zone B Women's Cup

== Honours ==
Ampem Darkoa Ladies

- Ghana Women's Premier League: 2021–22, 2022–23
- CAF Women's Champions League WAFU Zone B Qualifiers: 2023
