= 2024 CAF Women's Champions League WAFU Zone B Qualifiers =

Tournament details
- Host country: Ivory Coast
- Dates: 10–23 August
- Teams: 7 (from 7 associations)
- Venue: 2 (in 2 host cities)

Final positions
- Champions: (Nigeria) Edo Queens (1st title)
- Runners-up: (Benin) Ainonvi FC

Tournament statistics
- Matches played: 13
- Goals scored: 44 (3.38 per match)
- Top scorer(s): (Nigeria) Emem Peace Essien (6 goals)

The 2024 CAF Women's Champions League WAFU Zone B Qualifiers is the 4th edition of the CAF Women's Champions League WAFU Zone B Qualifiers organized by the WAFU for the women's clubs of association nations. This edition was held from 10 to 23 August 2023 in Ivory Coast. The tournament winners qualified automatically for the 2024 CAF Women's Champions League final tournament.

== Participating clubs ==
Team	Qualifying method	Appearances	Previous best performance
(Ivory Coast) FC Inter d'Abidjan	2023–24 Ivory Coast Women's Championship Champions	1st	n/a
(Benin) Ainonvi FC	2023–24 Benin Women's Championship Champions	1st	n/a
(Ghana) Hasaacas Ladies	2023–24 Ghana Women's Premier League Champions	2nd	Champions (2021)
(Niger) AS GNN	2023–24 Niger Women's Championship Champions	1st	n/a
(Burkina Faso) AO Etincelle	2023–24 Burkinabé Women's Championship Champions	1st	n/a
(Togo) ASKO Kara	2023–24 Togolese Women's Championship Champions	1st	n/a
(Nigeria) Edo Queens	2023–24 NWFL Premiership Champions	1st	n/a

== Venues ==
2024 CAF Women's Champions League WAFU Zone B Qualifiers is located in Ivory Coast	Bouaké	Yamoussoukro
2024 CAF Women's Champions League WAFU Zone B Qualifiers is located in Ivory Coast	Stade de la Paix	Charles Konan Banny Stadium
2024 CAF Women's Champions League WAFU Zone B Qualifiers is located in Ivory Coast	Capacity: 40,000	Capacity: 20,000

== Draw ==
The draw for this edition of the tournament was held on 24 July 2024 at 13:00 UTC+2 (13:00 CAT) in Egypt. The seven teams were drawn into 2 groups with teams finishing first and second in the groups qualifying for the knockout stages.

Seeded	Unseeded
(Ivory Coast) FC Inter d'Abidjan (hosts); (Ghana) Hasaacas Ladies	(Nigeria) Edo Queens; (Benin) Ainonvi FC; (Niger) AS GNN; (Burkina Faso) AO Etincelle; (Togo) ASKO Kara

== Group stage ==
Tiebreakers

Teams are ranked according to points (3 points for a win, 1 point for a draw, 0 points for a loss), and if tied on points, the following tiebreaking criteria are applied, in the order given, to determine the rankings.

1. Points in head-to-head matches among tied teams;
2. Goal difference in head-to-head matches among tied teams;
3. Goals scored in head-to-head matches among tied teams;
4. If more than two teams are tied, and after applying all head-to-head criteria above, a subset of teams are still tied, all head-to-head criteria above are reapplied exclusively to this subset of teams;
5. Goal difference in all group matches;
6. Goals scored in all group matches;
7. Penalty shoot-out if only two teams are tied and they met in the last round of the group;
8. Disciplinary points (yellow card = 1 point, red card as a result of two yellow cards = 3 points, direct red card = 3 points, yellow card followed by direct red card = 4 points);
9. Drawing of lots.

=== Group A ===
Pos	Team	Pld	W	D	L	GF	GA	GD	Pts	Qualification	AFC	FCI	ASK
1	(Benin) Ainonvi FC	2	2	0	0	4	2	+2	6	Semi-finals	—		2–1
2	(Ivory Coast) FC Inter d'Abidjan (H)	2	1	0	1	5	5	0	3	Semi-finals	1–2	—	
3	(Togo) ASKO Kara	2	0	0	2	4	6	−2	0			3–4	—

(H) Hosts
10 August 2024
15:00

FC Inter d'Abidjan (Ivory Coast)	1–2	(Benin) Ainonvi FC
Fofana 14'		Ligali 30'; Djibril 56'

Stade de la Paix, Bouake

13 August 2024
16:00

ASKO Kara (Togo)	1–2	(Benin) Ainonvi FC
Gbati 90'		Honfo 3'; Ligali 12'

Charles Konan Banny Stadium, Yamoussoukro

16 August 2024
16:00

FC Inter d'Abidjan (Ivory Coast)	4–3	(Togo) ASKO Kara
Behinan 39'; Agbo 52', 72', 90+1'	Report	Kadanga 8'; Kayaba 15'; Gbati 25'

Stade de la Paix, Bouake

=== Group B ===
Pos	Team	Pld	W	D	L	GF	GA	GD	Pts	Qualification	EDO	AOE	HSC	ASG
1	(Nigeria) Edo Queens	3	3	0	0	9	0	+9	9	Semi-finals	—	1–0	0–3	
2	(Burkina Faso) AO Etincelle	3	1	1	1	6	2	+4	4	Semi-finals		—		1–6
3	(Ghana) Hasaacas Ladies	3	1	1	1	6	4	+2	4			0–0	—	6–1
4	(Niger) AS GNN	3	0	0	3	2	17	−15	0		0–5			—

11 August 2024
16:00

Hasaacas Ladies (Ghana)	0–0	(Burkina Faso) AO Etincelle
	Report

Stade de la Paix, Bouake
11 August 2024
18:00

AS GNN (Niger)	0–5	(Nigeria) Edo Queens
	Report	Essien 36', 73'; Abideen 45+2'; Ilivieda 59'; Moses 71'

Stade de la Paix, Bouake

14 August 2024
15:00

AS GNN (Niger)	1–6	(Burkina Faso) AO Etincelle
Hassane 61'		Helbi 24', 56'; Congo 45+2'; Aicha 54'; Guira 75', 80'

Stade de la Paix, Bouake
14 August 2024
18:00

Hasaacas Ladies (Ghana)	0–3	(Nigeria) Edo Queens
		Essien 58', 68'; Suliat 88'

Stade de la Paix, Bouake

17 August 2024
16:00

Hasaacas Ladies (Ghana)	6–1	(Niger) AS GNN
Tamboura 17'; Animah 37'; Owusu 40', 46', 90+2'; Sakyiwaa 90+6'	Report	Hassane 45'

Stade de la Paix, Bouake
17 August 2024
16:00

AO Etincelle (Burkina Faso)	0–1	(Nigeria) Edo Queens
	Report	Jerry 41'

Stade de la Paix, Bouake

== Knockout stage ==
=== Semi-finals ===
20 August 2024
15:00

Ainonvi FC (Benin)	1–0	(Burkina Faso) AO Etincelle
Djibril 84'

Charles Konan Banny Stadium, Yamoussoukro
20 August 2024
18:30

Edo Queens (Nigeria)	2–1	(Ivory Coast) FC Inter d'Abidjan
Essien 7'; Ilivieda 34'		Niamien 46' (pen.)

Charles Konan Banny Stadium, Yamoussoukro

=== Third place match ===
22 August 2024
18:30

AO Etincelle (Burkina Faso)	0–1	(Ivory Coast) FC Inter d'Abidjan
		S. Behinan 27'

Stade de la Paix, Bouake

=== Final ===
23 August 2024
18:30

Ainonvi FC (Benin)	0–3	(Nigeria) Edo Queens
		Abideen 45+2'; Essien 59'; Ukandu 76' (o.g.)

Stade de la Paix, Bouake

== Awards and statistics ==
=== Goalscorers ===
There have been 44 goals scored in 13 matches, for an average of 3.38 goals per match (as of 23 August 2024).

Rank	Player	Team	Goals
1	Emem Peace Essien	(Nigeria) Edo Queens	6
2	Esperance Cousso Agbo	(Ivory Coast) FC Inter d'Abidjan	3
2	Suliat Abideen	(Nigeria) Edo Queens	3
2	Comfort Owusu	(Ghana) Hasaacas Ladies	3
5	Faridatou Ligali	(Benin) Ainonvi FC	2
5	Mounifatou Helbi	(Burkina Faso) AO Etincelle	2
5	Deborah Guira	(Burkina Faso) AO Etincelle	2
5	Kpandjapou Gbati	(Togo) ASKO Kara	2
5	Rahina Moussa Hassane	(Niger) AS GNN	2
5	Yasminath Djribil	(Benin) Ainonvi FC	2
5	Blessing Ilivieda	(Nigeria) Edo Queens	2
5	Melissa Sandrine Behinan	(Ivory Coast) FC Inter d'Abidjan	2
13	Mama Junior Fofana	(Ivory Coast) FC Inter d'Abidjan	1
13	Sandrine Niamien	(Ivory Coast) FC Inter d'Abidjan	1
13	A Dossi Germaine Honfo	(Benin) Ainonvi FC	1
13	Esther Chioma Moses	(Nigeria) Edo Queens	1
13	Joy Jerry	(Nigeria) Edo Queens	1
13	Solim Kadanga	(Togo) ASKO Kara	1
13	Tatiana Kayaba	(Togo) ASKO Kara	1
13	Adama Congo	(Burkina Faso) AO Etincelle	1
13	Sawadogo Aicha	(Burkina Faso) AO Etincelle	1
13	Fatoumata Tamboura	(Ghana) Hasaacas Ladies	1
13	Grace Animah	(Ghana) Hasaacas Ladies	1
13	Abigail Sakyiwaa	(Ghana) Hasaacas Ladies	1

own goals

Rank	Player	Team	Opponent	Goals
1	Elizabeth Ukandu	Ainonvi FC (Benin)	Edo Queens (Nigeria)	1
