= Mary Amponsah =

Ghanaian association football player

Personal information
- Date of birth: 16 April 2006 (age 20)
- Position: Forward

Team information
- Current team: Ampem Darkoa Ladies
- Number: 20

Senior career*
| Years | Team | Apps | (Gls) |
| 2021– | Ampem Darkoa Ladies | 37 | (24) |

International career
| 2023– | Ghana | 1 | (0) |
- * Club domestic league appearances and goals

Mary Amponsah (born 16 April 2006) is a Ghanaian professional footballer who plays as a forward for Ghana Women's Premier League side Ampem Darkoa Ladies and the Ghana women's national football team. She was adjudged the Women's footballer of the Year in 2023.

== Club career ==
Amponsah is a native of Sefwi Debiso in the Bia West District of the Western North Region, where she grew up.

Amponsah was top goal scorer in the 2021 Ghana Women's Super Cup.

In the 2022–23 Women's Premier League, Amponsah scored 16 goals in 19 games to help Ampem Darkoa win the league back-to-back. She also scored a goal in the final of the Ghana Women's FA Cup to secure a 3–1 victory over Police Ladies, to complete the club's first consecutive double in history. She was adjudged the Women's footballer of the Year in 2023.

On 20 August 2023, Amponsah scored all four goals in the 4–2 victory over Academie Amis du Monde in the 2023 CAF Women's Champions League WAFU Zone B Qualifiers.

== International career ==
Amponsah was a member of the Ghana U17 Women in 2022, and she took part in the 2022 African U-17 Women's World Cup qualifiers. She scored her first goal in their 7–0 rout of Guinea. In 2023, she was promoted to the Ghana U20 Women's team, where she scored her first goal in their 11–0 pre-tournament friendly win over Niger. She scored one goal in Ghana's 2023 WAFU Zone B U-20 Women's Cup victory.

Amponsah received her maiden senior call-up for the Ghana Women's national team ahead of a double-friendly match against Senegal in April 2023. She was an unused substitute in both matches. In July, she earned another call up ahead of the 2024 Olympic qualifiers against Guinea. On 14 July 2023, she made her debut coming on the second half to assist the third goal in a 3–0 victory.

Amponsah was named to the Ghana Women's national team for the first time ahead of a double-friendly match against Senegal in April 2023. In both games, she was an unused substitute. She was called up again in July for the 2024 Olympic qualifiers against Guinea. She made her debut on 14 July 2023, coming on in the second half for Princella Adubea to assist the third goal for Evelyn Badu in a 3–0 victory.

== Honours ==
Ghana U20

- WAFU Zone B U20 Women's Cup: 2023

Ampem Darkoa Ladies

- Ghana Women's Premier League: 2021–22, 2022–23
- Ghana Women's FA Cup: 2022, 2023
- WAFU Zone B Women's Champions League: 2023

Individual

- WAFU Zone B Women's Champions League Top goal scorer: 2023
- Ghana Women's Super Cup Top goal scorer: 2021
- Ghana Football Awards Women's Footballer of the Year: 2023
