= Nancy Amoh =

Ghanaian footballer

Personal information
- Date of birth: 18 September 2005 (age 21)
- Place of birth: Kumasi, Ghana
- Height: 1.67 m (5 ft 6 in)
- Position: Midfielder

Team information
- Current team: Ampem Darkoa Ladies
- Number: 10

Senior career*
Years	Team	Apps	(Gls)
- Ampem Darkoa Ladies
2025–2026	DUX Logroño		
2026	Real Oviedo		
2026–	Ampem Darkoa Ladies		

International career
- Ghana U17
- Ghana
- * Club domestic league appearances and goals

Nancy Amoh (born 18 September 2005) is a Ghanaian footballer who plays as a midfielder. She has represented the Ghana national team and played club football for Ampem Darkoa Ladies, DUX Logroño and Real Oviedo.

== Club career ==
Amoh played for Ampem Darkoa Ladies in Ghana before joining Spanish club DUX Logroño in September 2025.

In January 2026, she joined Real Oviedo from DUX Logroño on a contract running until 30 June 2026.

She returned to Ampem Darkoa Ladies and helped the team win the 2026 CAF Women's Champions League WAFU B qualifiers. Amoh scored two goals in the 2026 CAF Women's Champions League, one against USFAS Bamako and the other against Kawempe Muslim Ladies. Even though the team failed to progress out the group stages she was included in the group stage best XI for her performances.

== International career ==
=== Youth ===
Amoh represented Ghana at under-17 level. On 20 May 2022, she scored a direct free kick in a 2–0 victory over Morocco in qualification for the FIFA U-17 Women's World Cup.

=== Senior ===
Amoh was part of Ghana's squad at the 2024 Women's Africa Cup of Nations, held in Morocco in 2025. She converted Ghana's decisive penalty in the third-place play-off against South Africa. Ghana won the shoot-out 4–3 following a 1–1 draw to secure the bronze medal.

== International goals ==
No.	Date	Venue	Opponent	Score	Result	Competition
1.	13 October 2026	Accra Sports Stadium, Accra, Ghana	Mauritius	6–0	7–0	2028 CAF Women's Olympic qualifying tournament

== Honours ==
Ghana

- Women's Africa Cup of Nations third place: 2024

Ampem Darkoa Ladies

- CAF Women's Champions League WAFU Zone B Qualifiers: 2026

Individual

- 2026 CAF Women's Champions League: Group Stage Best XI
