= Melissa Behinan =

Ivorian footballer (born 2003)

Personal information
- Full name: Melissa Sandrine Behinan
- Date of birth: 25 May 2003 (age 23)/>
- Place of birth: Ivory Coast
- Position: Midfielder

Team information
- Current team: Amed
- Number: 52

Senior career*
Years	Team	Apps	(Gls)
- Athlético d'Abidjan
- Inter d'Abidjan
2025–	Amed	2	(0)

International career
- Ivory Coast
- * Club domestic league appearances and goals as of 28 September 2025

Melissa Sandrine Behinan (born 25 May 2003) is an Ivorian professional women's football midfielder who plays in the Turkish Super League for Amed and the Ivory Coast women's national team.

== Club career ==
Behinan played for Athlético d'Abidjan, and took part at the 2023 CAF Women's Champions League WAFU Zone B Qualifiers matches. She then transferred to Inter d'Abidjan, and played at the 2024 CAF Women's Champions League WAFU Zone B Qualifiers matches.

In September 2025, she moved to Turkey, and signed with the Diyarbakır-based club Amed to play in the Super League.

== International career ==
Behinan is part of the Ivory Coast women's national football team.
