= Ami Diallo =

Ivorian footballer (born 2000)

Personal information
- Full name: Ami Prisca Diallo
- Date of birth: October 2, 2000 (age 26)
- Place of birth: Abobo, Ivory Coast
- Height: 1.74 m (5 ft 9 in)
- Position: Forward

Team information
- Current team: Seattle Reign
- Number: 27

Senior career*
Years	Team	Apps	(Gls)
- Juventus Yopougon
- ASEC Mimosas
2026–	Seattle Reign	0	(0)

International career
- Ivory Coast
- * Club domestic league appearances and goals

Ami Prisca Diallo (born 2 October 2000) is an Ivorian professional footballer who plays as a forward for Seattle Reign FC of the National Women's Soccer League (NWSL) and the Ivory Coast national team.

== Club career ==
Diallo joined ASEC Mimosas from Juventus Yopougon. On 21 November 2025, she scored the only goal for her side in the CAF Women's Champions League final against AS FAR, but lost the match 2–1. She finished the tournament with three goals, including a double against Gaborone United to secure a spot in the semifinals, and was among three finalists for CAF Interclub Player of the Year. At year's end, she led the domestic league with 18 goals halfway through the season. She finished the season with 31 goals (second behind her teammate Habibou Ouédraogo) as ASEC won their second consecutive league title.

On 18 August 2026, it was announced that Diallo had joined the National Women's Soccer League (NWSL)'s Seattle Reign for an undisclosed transfer fee, signing a three-year contract.

== International career ==
Diallo helped the Ivory Coast qualify for the 2026 Women's Africa Cup of Nations, their first appearance at the tournament since 2014.

== Honors ==
ASEC Mimosas

- Ivorian Division 1 Féminine: 2024–25, 2025–26
