= Grâce Sery =

Ivorian footballer (born 2008)

Personal information
- Full name: Grâce Ruth Sery
- Date of birth: 6 February 2008 (age 18)
- Height: 1.63 m (5 ft 4 in)
- Position: Midfielder

Team information
- Current team: Nordsjælland
- Number: 10

Youth career
- 2018–2026: Right to Dream Academy

Senior career*
Years	Team	Apps	(Gls)
2026–	Nordsjælland	9	(7)

International career
2025	Ivory Coast U17		
2025	Ivory Coast U20		
2026–	Ivory Coast		(4)
- * Club domestic league appearances and goals as of 08:10, 4 November 2026 (UTC)

Grâce Ruth Sery (born 6 February 2008) is an Ivorian professional footballer who plays as a midfielder for Danish A-Liga club Nordsjælland and the Côte d'Ivoire national team.

== Club career ==
At just 10 years old, Sery joined the Right to Dream Academy in Ghana in 2018.

In February 2026, Sery joined Danish club Nordsjælland on a three-year contract. becoming the second Right to Dream graduate to join the Farum-based side after Princess Marfo.

Sery was nominated for the CAF Youth Player of the Year award in November 2026.

== International career ==
=== Senior ===
At the age of 18, Sery earned her first senior call-up for Ivory Coast in February 2026 for friendly matches against Benin and Kenya. She made her debut on 28 February, scoring the opening goal in a 2–1 win over Benin. Although she missed the 2026 FIFA Series, she returned to the squad in June for friendlies against Cape Verde before being selected for Ivory Coast's final squad for the 2026 Women's Africa Cup of Nations, where she scored twice in a 2–2 draw against South Africa.

=== International goals ===
Scores and results list Ivory Coast's goal tally first, score column indicates score after each Sery goal.

No.	Date	Venue	Opponent	Score	Result	Competition
1	28 February 2026	Felix Houphouet Boigny Stadium, Abidjan	Benin	1–0	2–1	Friendly
2	20 July 2026	Berrechid Municipal Stadium, Berrechid	Mali	1–0	1–0	Friendly
3	31 July 2026	Moulay Rachid Stadium, Casablanca	South Africa	1–0	2–2	2026 Africa Cup of Nations
4	31 July 2026	Moulay Rachid Stadium, Casablanca	South Africa	2–0	2–2	2026 Africa Cup of Nations
