= ASKO Kara (women) =

Togolese women's football team

- Full name: Association sportive de la Kozah
- League: Togolese Women's Championship

Association sportive de la Kozah is a Togolese professional women's football club in Kara who plays in the Togolese Women's Championship, the top tier of Togolese women's football.

== History ==
In June 2023, ASKO Kara absorbed Bella FC, a women's club based in Kara, establishing its own women's section to meet CAF's criteria for participating in continental competitions. During the 2022–2023 season, ASKO lost in the championship final to AS OTR Lomé 2–0.

When AS OTR Lomé withdrew from the 2024 CAF Women's Champions League WAFU Zone B Qualifiers due to financial constraints, ASKO replaced them as Togo's representative. In the final group match of the UFOA-B qualifying tournament, ASKO needed to defeat FC Inter d'Abidjan to advance. Despite leading 3–0, the team suffered a comeback as the Ivorians won 4–3, eliminating the Kondonas.

== Honours ==
Type	Competition	Titles	Winning Seasons	Runners-up
Domestic	Togolese Women's Championship	1	2023	2024

== See also ==
- Togolese Women's Championship
- CAF Women's Champions League
