= Princella Adubea =

Ghanaian footballer (born 1998)

Personal information
- Date of birth: 27 December 1998 (age 27)
- Place of birth: Techiman, Ghana
- Position: Forward

Team information
- Current team: Abu Dhabi Country Club

Senior career*
| Years | Team | Apps | (Gls) |
| 2014–2019 | Ampem Darkoa Ladies | | |
| 2019–2020 | Sporting de Huelva | 20 | (1) |
| 2020–2022 | Racing de Santander | 32 | (4) |
| 2022–2024 | Kiryat Gat | 28 | (17) |
| 2024–2025 | Trabzonspor | 7 | (0) |
| 2025– | Abu Dhabi Country Club | 1 | (1) |

International career
- Ghana
- * Club domestic league appearances and goals as of 22 December 2024

Princella Adubea (born 27 December 1998) is a Ghanaian professional women's football forward who plays in the Emirati side Abu Dhabi Country Club, and the Ghana women's national team. She represented Ghana at the U20 level at two World Cups in 2016 and 2018. She previously played for Sporting de Huelva.

== Club career ==
Adubea started her career with Techiman-based club Ampem Darkoa Ladies in 2014. In 2016, she led the club to their maiden Ghana Women's Premier League for the 2015–16 season after defeating the defending champions Hasaacas Ladies by a lone goal in the championship final. She scored 19 goals in 11 matches to emerge as the top goal scorer of the season. She also ended the season as the top goal scorer in the 2016 Ghana Women's FA Cup. She won the SWAG Female footballer of the year beating off competition from Elizabeth Addo and Sandra Owusu-Ansah.

She helped the club to retain their Premier League title by scoring the lone goal in the Championship final at the Baba Yara Sports Stadium against Lady Strikers. She scored 16 goals to also retain her top scorer award and win it in two consecutive seasons.

In September 2024, she moved to Turkey, and joined Trabzonspor to play in the Super League. In March 2025, she joined Emirati side Abu Dhabi Country Club.

== International goals ==
| No. | Date | Venue | Opponent | Score | Result | Competition |
|---|---|---|---|---|---|---|
| 1. | 6 April 2016 | Stade Oued Ellil, Oued Ellil, Tunisia | Tunisia | 2–1 | 2–1 | 2016 Women's Africa Cup of Nations qualification |
| 2. | 12 April 2016 | Accra Sports Stadium, Accra, Ghana | Tunisia | 3–0 | 4–0 | 2016 Women's Africa Cup of Nations qualification |
| 3. | 20 September 2021 | Onikan Stadium, Lagos, Nigeria | Cameroon | 1–0 | 2–0 | Aisha Buhari Cup |
| 4. | 24 October 2021 | Accra Sports Stadium, Accra, Ghana | Nigeria | 1–0 | 1–0 | 2022 Women's Africa Cup of Nations qualification |
| 5. | 19 February 2023 | Stade de l'Amitié, Cotonou, Benin | Benin | 2–0 | 3–0 | Friendly |
| 6. | 14 July 2023 | General Lansana Conté Stadium, Conakry, Guinea | Guinea | 2–0 | 3–0 | 2024 CAF Women's Olympic Qualifying Tournament |
| 7. | 18 July 2023 | Accra Sports Stadium, Accra, Ghana | Guinea | 2–0 | 4–0 | 2024 CAF Women's Olympic Qualifying Tournament |
| 8. | 20 September 2023 | Kigali Pelé Stadium, Kigali, Rwanda | Rwanda | 3–0 | 7–0 | 2024 Women's Africa Cup of Nations qualification |
| 9. | 14 July 2025 | Berkane Stadium, Berkane, Morocco | Tanzania | 1–0 | 4–1 | 2024 Women's Africa Cup of Nations |

== Honours ==
Ampem Darkoa

- Ghana Women's Premier League: 2015–16, 2017
- Ghana Women's Super Cup: 2017, 2018

Kiryat Gat

- Ligat Nashim: 2022–23
- Toto Cup: 2022

Ghana

- Turkish Women's Cup third-place: 2020

Individual

- African U-20 Women's World Cup Qualifying Tournament Top goal scorer: 2018
- Ghana Women's Premier League Top goal scorer: 2015–16, 2017
- Ghana Women's Premier League Most Promising Player: 2014–15
- SWAG Female footballer of the Year: 2016, 2017
- Ghana Women's FA Cup Top goal scorer: 2016

== See also ==
- List of Ghana women's international footballers
