= Ghana Women's FA Cup =

Cup competition for women's football in the Ghana

- Founded: 2016
- Region: Ghana
- Current champions: Hasaacas Ladies (1st title) 2021
- Most championships: Police Ladies (1 title); Prisons Ladies (1 title); Hasaacas Ladies (1 title)
- 2021 Ghana Women's FA Cup

The Ghana Women's FA Cup, is the top women's knockout tournament of the Ghanaian association football. The competition is played between the clubs of the Ghana Women's Premier League and Division One League. The inaugural winners of the competition were Police Ladies.

== History ==
The Ghana Women's FA Cup was launched in 2016 by the Women's League Board (WLB) of Ghana Football Association (GFA) as the highest women's knockout tournament. The first four editions of the competitions from 2016 to 2020 were sponsored by Sanford Women's Clinic. In 2016, Police Ladies defeated Fabulous Ladies by 2–1 to win the maiden edition of the cup. Princella Adubea of Ampem Darko Ladies won the top goal scorer of the competition with 6 goals, whilst Suzy Teye Dede of Lady Strikers was also awarded as the discovery of the tournament.

In 2017, Prisons Ladies defeated Police Ladies by a lone goal to lift the Women's FA Cup. Former Black Maidens striker Sylvian Amankwah scored the only goal to give the Sunyani-based side a win to help them claim the trophy.

In 2018, there was no Ghana Women's FA Cup competition due to the dissolution of the Ghana Football Association (GFA) after the Anas Number 12 investigative piece. Similarly, in 2019, there was no competition. Then in 2020, the competition was abandoned due to the Covid-19 pandemic.

The competition returned in the 2020/21 football season. That season, Hasaacas Ladies emerged as champions after a campaign where they defeated Ampem Darkoa Ladies in the final.

The following year, Army Ladies secured the Ghana Women's FA Cup title in the 2023/24 season, before Faith Ladies also won the trophy for the first time in the 2024/25 campaign to add their name to the growing list of champions.

Hasaacas Ladies were crowned champions of the 2025/26 Women's FA Cup after defeating Army Ladies 5-3 on penalties in the final at Kukurantumi Ohene Park. The encounter ended 1-1 after extra time before Hasaacas Ladies won the trophy through the penalty shootout.

== Sponsorship ==
The first four editions of the competitions from 2016 to 2020 were sponsored by Sanford Women's Clinic.

In June 2021, the GFA announced that Electroland Ghana Ltd, distributors of NASCO electronic appliances and sponsors of the Player of the Match award for the Women's Premier League had extended their sponsorship package to the Women's FA Cup competition, with players who were adjudged as best players from the Round of 16 and Quarter-finals were to receive a NASCO Hand dryer and a sleek NASCO Mobile Phone each. The best players from the Semi-finals and the Final game were also entitled to products from NASCO.

== Winners ==
	Winner	Score	Finalist
2016	Police Ladies	2–1	Fabulous Ladies
2017	Prisons Ladies	1–0	Police Ladies
2018	Abandoned due to GFA dissolution		
2019	Not played		
2020	Abandoned due COVID-19 pandemic		
2021	Hasaacas Ladies	2–0	Ampem Darkoa Ladies
2022	Ampem Darkoa Ladies	1-0	Hasaacas Ladies
2023	Ampem Darkoa Ladies	3-1(aet)	Police Ladies FC
2024	Army Ladies	1-0	Police Ladies FC
2025	Hasaacas Ladies	5-3pen	Army Ladies

== See also ==
- Ghanaian FA Cup
- Ghana Women's Premier League
- Ghana Women's Super Cup
