= Ivory Coast women's national football team =

Women's national association football team representing Ivory Coast

Ivory Coast
- Association: Ivorian Football Federation
- Confederation: CAF (Africa)
- Sub-confederation: WAFU (West Africa)
- Head coach: Reynald Pedros
- Captain: Cynthia Djohoré
- FIFA code: CIV
First colours	Second colours

FIFA ranking
- Current: 72 (16 June 2026)
- Highest: 59 (March 2017)
- Lowest: 78 (December 2007)

First international
- Netherlands 3–0 Ivory Coast (Foshan, China; 1 June 1988)

Biggest win
- Turks & Caicos 1–15 Ivory Coast (Abidjan, Ivory Coast; 12 April 2026)

Biggest defeat
- Germany 10–0 Ivory Coast (Ottawa, Ontario, Canada; 7 June 2015)

World Cup
- Appearances: 1 (first in 2015)
- Best result: Group stage (2015)

Africa Women Cup of Nations
- Appearances: 3 (first in 2012)
- Best result: Third place (2014)

The Ivory Coast women's national football team (French: Équipe de Côte d'Ivoire féminine de football, recognized as Côte d'Ivoire by FIFA) represents Ivory Coast in international women's football and is controlled by the Ivorian Football Federation. They played their first international match in 1988. The team is currently ranked 72nd in the FIFA Women's World Rankings and as the 6th best team in CAF.

== History ==
=== The beginning ===
Ivory Coast played their first FIFA recognised match in 1988 when they participated in the 1988 FIFA Women's Invitation Tournament. The country was in Group A. On 1 June, they lost to the Netherlands 0–3 in a game in Foshan. On 3 June, they lost to Canada 0–6 in a game in Foshan. In a game on 5 June, they lost to China 1–8 in a game in Guangzhou. In 1992, they competed at the 1st Lyon'ne Cup — Women, held in Lyon, France from 17 to 20 April. Ivory Coast was in the nation's group. They lost to the United States U20 team 0–4, lost to the CIS team 0–3 and lost to France 1–6. In 2002, the team competed in 2 matches. In 2003, they played in 0 matches. In 2004, they played in 0 matches. In 2005, they played in 3 matches. In 2006, they played in 2 matches. In 2006, the team had 3 training sessions a week. In 2005, they played in the women's Tournoi de Solidarité in Dakar, Senegal. On 18 May, they lost to Mali 1–6. On 20 May, they tied Senegal 3–3. They did not make the finals and overall finished last in the tournament. On 17 May 2006 in Dakar, Togo tied Ivory Coast 3–3. In 2007, the country competed at the Tournoi de Cinq Nations] held in Ouagadougou. On 2 September, they tied Mali 1–1 with Rita Akaffou scoring for the team in the 65th minute. On 5 September, they beat Togo 5–0 before Togo was disqualified from the competition for bringing a club team. On 6 September, they lost to Mali 1–2. In 2010, the country had a team at the African Women's Championships during the preliminary rounds. In the round, they beat Guinea 5–1. They lost to Malawi 4–2 in the return leg. In the 2010, Women's Championship in Africa, they lost in the preliminary round in March, they beat Gabon at home and away 2–1 and 3–1. In the first round against Nigeria, they lost both matches by scores of 1–2 and 1–3. The country did not have a team competing at the 2011 All Africa Games.

The national team has trained in Abidjan. As of 2006, the country did not have an under-17 or under-20 side. In June 2012, the team was ranked 67th in the world by FIFA and the 6th best team in CAF. This was an improvement of four places from March 2012 when they were ranked 71st in the world. The team's worst ever ranking was in 2011 when they were ranked 136th in the world. Other rankings include 73 in 2006, 75 in 2007, 74 in 2008, 92 in 2009, and 77 in 2010.

However, in 2014 African Women's Championship, Ivory Coast surprised everyone by passing through into the semi-final, and later, they shocked Africa by beating giant South Africa, marked for the first time they would play in FIFA Women's World Cup, in Canada 2015. In the later tournament, the World Cup, they were eliminated with three total losses to Germany (0–10), Thailand (2–3) and Norway (1–3). Despite having lost all, Ange N'Guessan's goal over Norway was voted as one of ten best goal in the whole tournament.

=== Background and development ===
Early development of the women's game at the time colonial powers brought football to the continent was limited, as colonial powers in the region tended to take concepts of patriarchy and women's participation in sport with them to local cultures that had similar concepts already embedded in them. The lack of later development of the national team on a wider international level symptomatic of all African teams is a result of several factors, including limited access to education, poverty amongst women in the wider society, and fundamental inequality present in the society that occasionally allows for female-specific human rights abuses. When quality female football players are developed, they tend to leave for greater opportunities abroad. Continent-wide, funding is also an issue, with most development money coming from FIFA, not the national football association. Future success for women's football in Africa is dependent on improved facilities and access by women to these facilities. Attempting to commercialise the game and make it commercially viable is not the solution, as demonstrated by the current existence of many youth and women's football camps held throughout the continent.

Football is the fourth most popular girls' sport, trailing behind handball, basketball and athletics. A women's football program was set up in the country in 1975 and girls' football is played in schools. Player registration starts at nine years of age. In 2006, there were 610 registered female players, 560 of whom were senior players and 50 were under 18 years of age. This was an increase from 2002 when there were 130 registered female players, 2003 when there were 220, 2004 when there were 253, and 2005 when there were 428 registered players. In 2006, there were 123 football clubs in the country, of which 11 were women's-only sides. As of 2009, there are 36 senior teams and 4 youth teams for women. A school based competition exists.

The national federation was created in 1960 and became FIFA affiliated in 1964. Their kit includes orange shirts, white shorts and green socks. The national committee does not have a full-time employee in charge of women's football. Representation of women's football is not guaranteed in the federation's constitution. The FIFA trigramme is CIV. A FIFA-run women's MA football course was run in the country in 2007.

== Results and fixtures ==
The following is a list of match results within the last 12 months.

Legend

Win Draw Lose Fixture

=== 2026 ===
28 February Friendly	Ivory Coast	2–1	Benin	Abidjan
17:00 GMT	Grâce Sery 18'; Inès Konan 29'	Report	Romaine Gandonou 60' (pen.)	Stadium: Felix Houphouet Boigny Stadium

4 March Friendly	Ivory Coast	1–0	Kenya	Abidjan
19:00 GMT	Rebecca Elloh 22'	Report		Stadium: Alassane Ouattara Stadium

9 April 2026 FIFA Women's Series	Ivory Coast	8–0	Mauritania	Abidjan
19:30 GMT	Priscille Kreto 6', 13', 31'; Bernadette Amani 23'; Habibou Ouédraogo 41', 43'; Essi Dagba 65'; Akébié Abrogoua 79'	Report		Stadium: Alassane Ouattara Stadium; Referee: Jacqueline Nikiéma (Burkina Faso)

12 April 2026 FIFA Women's Series	Turks and Caicos Isl.	1–15	Ivory Coast	Abidjan
19:30 GMT	Irener Moline 28'	Report	Ami Diallo 6', 10', 23', 42'; Priscille Kreto 12' (pen.), 22', 27', 52'; Rosemonde Kouassi 32'; Sylviane Kokora 45'; Ange N'Guessan 45+3' (pen.); Inès Konan 47', 77', 83'; Akébié Abrogoua 90+2'	Stadium: Alassane Ouattara Stadium; Referee: Edoh Kindedji (Togo)

16 April 2026 FIFA Women's Series	Ivory Coast	2–0	Pakistan	Abidjan
19:30 GMT	Ami Diallo 40'; Habibou Ouédraogo 69'	Report (FIFA)		Stadium: Alassane Ouattara Stadium; Referee: Jacqueline Nikiéma (Burkina Faso)

5 June Friendly	Ivory Coast	3–0	Cape Verde	Abidjan
19:00 GMT	Rosemonde Kouassi 28', 60'; N'Sira Ouédraogo 45+2'	Report		Stadium: Felix Houphouet Boigny Stadium

8 June Friendly	Ivory Coast	0–0	Cape Verde	Abidjan
19:00 GMT		Report		Stadium: Felix Houphouet Boigny Stadium; Referee: Félicité Kourouma (Guinea)

14 July Friendly	Ghana	1–0	Ivory Coast	Casablanca, Morocco
17:00 GMT	Sharon Sampson 75'	Report		Stadium: Père Jégo Stadium

20 July Friendly	Mali	0–1	Ivory Coast	Berrechid, Morocco
17:00 GMT		Report	Grâce Sery 42'	Stadium: Berrechid Municipal Stadium

27 July 2026 WAfCON GS	Ivory Coast	4–1	Burkina Faso	Casablanca, Morocco
20:00 GMT	Rebecca Elloh 7' (pen.); Inès Konan 16', 23'; N'Sira Ouédraogo 56'	Report	Adama Congo 60'	Stadium: Larbi Zaouli Stadium; Referee: Josephine Wanjiku (Kenya)

31 July 2026 WAfCON GS	South Africa	2–2	Ivory Coast	Casablanca, Morocco
17:00 GMT	Thembi Kgatlana 71'; Hildah Magaia 90+9'	Report	Grâce Sery 18', 36'	Stadium: Moulay Rachid Stadium; Referee: Rachel Zihindula (DR Congo)

4 August 2026 WAfCON GS	Tanzania	1–2	Ivory Coast	Casablanca, Morocco
20:00 GMT	Diana Msewa 90+9' (pen.)	Report	N'Sira Ouédraogo 44'; Inès Konan 68' (pen.)	Stadium: Larbi Zaouli Stadium; Referee: Antsino Twanyanyukwa (Namibia)

8 August 2026 WAfCON QF	Ivory Coast	1–2	Algeria	Casablanca, Morocco
17:00 GMT	Inès Konan 29'; N'Sira Ouedraogo (red card) 42'; Rebecca Elloh (penalty missed) 62'	Report	Inès Khiri 56'; Amira Ould Braham 64'	Stadium: Moulay Rachid Stadium; Referee: Shamirah Nabadda (Uganda)

13 August 2027 World Cup Qualifier	Ivory Coast	1–2	Ghana	Casablanca, Morocco
17:00 GMT	Inès Konan 4' (pen.)	Report	Princess Marfo 59'; Josephine Bonsu 72' (pen.)	Stadium: Larbi Zaouli Stadium; Referee: Akhona Makalima (South Africa)

9 October 2028 CAF Olympic qualifying	DR Congo	1–4	Ivory Coast	Lubumbashi, DR Congo
13:30 GMT	Anastasia Soulac 16'	Report	Grâce Sery 3' (pen.), 20'; Estelle Gnaly 49'; Karidja Fofana 53'	Stadium: TP Mazembe Stadium; Referee: Diana Murungi (Uganda)

13 October 2028 CAF Olympic qualifying	Ivory Coast	3–0	DR Congo	Abidjan
19:00 GMT	N'Sira Ouédraogo 18'; Nadja Meïté 24'; Grâce Sery 90+3'	Report		Stadium: Felix Houphouet Boigny Stadium

=== 2027 ===
Source :Global archive

== Coaching staff ==
=== Current coaching staff ===
Position	Name	Ref.
Head coach	(France) Reynald Pedros	
Assistant coach	(France) Éric Garcin	
GK coach	(Ivory Coast) Mathieu Kipré	
Assistant physical coach	(Ivory Coast) Krah Kouabenan	
Video analyst	(France) Raphaël Eugster	

=== Manager history ===
- (Ivory Coast) Adélaïde Koudougnon (2004–2010)
- (Ivory Coast) Clémentine Touré (2010–2024)
- (France) Reynald Pedros (2024–)

== Players ==
Up-to-date caps, goals, and statistics are not publicly available; therefore, caps and goals listed may be incorrect.

=== Current squad ===
- The following players were called up for the 2026 WAFCON matches from 26 July through 16 August 2026. . In alignment with the CAF 26-player limit, Salimata Ballo and Yabré Bimanta were omitted from the official list.

No.	Pos.	Player	Date of birth (age)	Club
1	GK	Aramatou Diakité	23 July 2001 (aged 25)	(Ivorian Football Federation) AGIR
2	DF	Ada Daple	12 November 1999 (aged 26)	(Italian Football Federation) San Marino Academy
3	DF	Aboa Yapo	21 June 2002 (aged 24)	(Ivorian Football Federation) ASEC Mimosas
4	FW	Anne Huviezo	1 July 2000 (aged 26)	(Ivorian Football Federation) ASEC Mimosas
5	DF	Mariam Diakité	11 April 1995 (aged 31)	(Turkish Football Federation) Fenerbahçe
6	MF	Bernadette Kakounan	4 September 1997 (aged 28)	(German Football Association) Bayern Munich
7	MF	Melissa Behinan	25 May 2003 (aged 23)	(Turkish Football Federation) Amed
8	MF	Sylviane Kokora	12 July 1995 (aged 31)	(Royal Moroccan Football Federation) SC Casablanca
9	FW	Priscille Kreto	5 August 1997 (aged 28)	(Kazakhstan Football Federation) BIIK Shymkent
10	MF	Rebecca Elloh	25 December 1994 (aged 31)	(Royal Spanish Football Federation) Valencia
11	FW	N'Sira Ouédraogo	21 April 2008 (aged 18)	(Danish Football Association) Nordsjælland
12	MF	Rosemonde Kouassi	26 December 2001 (aged 24)	(United States Soccer Federation) Washington Spirit
13	MF	Yeti Doudou Touré	16 May 2003 (aged 23)	(Ivorian Football Federation) ASEC Mimosas
14	FW	Ami Diallo	2 October 2000 (aged 25)	(Ivorian Football Federation) ASEC Mimosas
15	DF	Anastasie Gbéhi	30 December 2002 (aged 23)	(Ivorian Football Federation) ASEC Mimosas
16	GK	Océane Lamfir	15 October 2007 (aged 18)	(Ivorian Football Federation) Stella Club
17	MF	Ange N'Guessan	18 November 1990 (aged 35)	(Royal Spanish Football Federation) Tenerife
18	MF	Frédérique Abrogoua	17 July 2001 (aged 25)	(French Football Federation) Nice
19	FW	Inès Konan	8 January 2002 (aged 24)	(French Football Federation) Strasbourg
20	DF	Matoba Cissé	26 March 1997 (aged 29)	(Tanzania Football Federation) Tausi
21	MF	Essi Dagba	21 September 2003 (aged 22)	(Ivorian Football Federation) ASEC Mimosas
22	MF	Erika Gnounoué	20 January 2000 (aged 26)	(Ivorian Football Federation) ASEC Mimosas
23	GK	Leslie Amani	8 February 1998 (aged 28)	(Ivorian Football Federation) FC Mouna
24	DF	Mariam Diawara	15 April 2004 (aged 22)	(Ivorian Football Federation) ASEC Mimosas
25	DF	Aïcha Fofana	6 October 2000 (aged 25)	(Ivorian Football Federation) ASEC Mimosas
26	MF	Ruth Sery	6 February 2008 (aged 18)	(Danish Football Association) Nordsjælland

=== Recent call-ups ===
The following players have been called up to an Ivory Coast squad in the past 12 months.

Pos.	Player	Date of birth (age)	Caps	Goals	Club	Latest call-up
GK	Ablan Gnamien	-	-	-	(Ivory Coast) AFAN Abengourou	v Senegal, November 2025
GK	Agnès Koffi	27 January 1996 (age 30)	-	-	(Ivory Coast) Juventus Yopougon	v Senegal, November 2025
DF	Nina Kpaho	30 December 1996 (age 29)	-	-	(Turkey) Beylerbeyi	v Senegal, November 2025
MF	Sopie Brou	27 January 2006 (age 20)	-	-	(Ivory Coast) ASEC Mimosas	v Senegal, November 2025
FW	Habibou Ouedraogo	18 February 2002 (age 24)	-	-	(Ivory Coast) ASEC Mimosas	v Senegal, November 2025
FW	Jocelyne Koffi	-	-	-	(United States) Suffield Academy	v Senegal, November 2025

== Records ==
=== Individual records ===
*Active players in bold, statistics correct as of 26 July 2021.

=== Most capped players ===
#	Player	Year(s)	Caps

=== Top goalscorers ===
#	Player	Year(s)	Goals	Caps

== Competitive record ==
=== FIFA Women's World Cup ===
FIFA Women's World Cup record
Year	Result	Position	Pld	W	D	L	GF	GA
(China) 1991	Did not enter							
(Sweden) 1995	Did not enter							
(United States) 1999	Did not enter							
(United States) 2003	Did not qualify							
(China) 2007	Did not qualify							
(Germany) 2011	Did not qualify							
(Canada) 2015	Group stage	23rd	3	0	0	3	3	16
(France) 2019	Did not qualify							
(Australia) (New Zealand) 2023	Did not qualify							
(Brazil) 2027	Did not qualify							
(Costa Rica) (Jamaica) (Mexico) (United States) 2031	To be determined							
(United Kingdom) 2035	To be determined							
Total	1/12	-	3	0	0	3	3	16

FIFA Women's World Cup history
Year	Round	Date	Opponent	Result	Stadium
(Canada) 2015	Group stage	7 June	Germany	**L** 0–10	TD Place Stadium, Ottawa
(Canada) 2015	Group stage	11 June	Thailand	**L** 2–3	TD Place Stadium, Ottawa
(Canada) 2015	Group stage	15 June	Norway	**L** 1–3	Moncton Stadium, Moncton

=== Olympic Games ===
Summer Olympics record
Year	Result	Pld	W	D*	L	GS	GA	GD
(United States) 1996	Did not qualify							
(Australia) 2000	Did not qualify							
(Greece) 2004	Did not qualify							
(China) 2008	Did not qualify							
(United Kingdom) 2012	Did not qualify							
(Brazil) 2016	Did not qualify							
(Japan) 2020	Did not qualify							
(France) 2024	Did not qualify							
(United States) 2028	To be determined							
Total	0/9	0	0	0	0	0	0	0

*Draws include knockout matches decided on penalty kicks.

=== Africa Women Cup of Nations ===
Africa Women Cup of Nations record
Year	Result	Matches	Wins	Draws	Losses	GF	GA
1991	Did not enter						
1995	Did not enter						
(Nigeria) 1998	Did not enter						
(South Africa) 2000	Did not enter						
(Nigeria) 2002	Did not qualify						
(South Africa) 2004	Did not enter						
(Nigeria) 2006	Did not qualify						
(Equatorial Guinea) 2008	Did not qualify						
(South Africa) 2010	Did not qualify						
(Equatorial Guinea) 2012	Group stage	3	1	0	2	7	7
(Namibia) 2014	**Third place**	**5**	**2**	**1**	**2**	**8**	**8**
(Cameroon) 2016	Did not qualify						
(Ghana) 2018	Did not qualify						
2020	Cancelled due to covid						
(Morocco) 2022	Did not qualify						
(Morocco) 2024	Did not qualify						
(Morocco) 2026	Quarter final	4	2	1	2	10	8
**Total:3/14**	**Third place**	**13**	**5**	**2**	**6**	**25**	**23**

=== African Games ===
African Games record
Year	Result	Matches	Wins	Draws	Losses	GF	GA
(Nigeria) 2003	Did not enter						
(Algeria) 2007	Did not enter						
(Mozambique) 2011	Did not qualify						
(Republic of the Congo) 2015	**Bronze Medal**	5	4	0	1	6	3
(Morocco) 2019	See Ivory Coast women's national under-20 football team						
(Ghana) 2023	See Ivory Coast women's national under-20 football team						
Total	1/4	5	4	0	1	6	3

=== WAFU Women's Cup record ===
WAFU Zone B Women's Cup
Year	Result	Position	Pld	W	D	L	GF	GA
(Ivory Coast) 2018	Runners-up	2nd	5	3	1	1	11	2
(Ivory Coast) 2019	Runners-up	2nd	5	3	2	0	12	2
Total	Runners-up	2/2	10	6	3	1	23	4

== Honours ==
=== Major competitions ===
- **Women's Africa Cup of Nations**

Third place: (1) 2014

== See also ==
- Sport in Ivory Coast
  - Football in Ivory Coast
- Ivory Coast women's national football team
  - List of Ivory Coast women's international footballers
- Ivory Coast women's national youth football team
  - Ivory Coast women's national under-20 football team
  - Ivory Coast women's national under-17 football team
