= Ghana Women's Super Cup =

- Founded: 2017
- Region: Ghana
- Teams: 2
- Current champions: Ampem Darkoa Ladies
- Most championships: Ampem Darkoa Ladies (2 titles)

The Ghana Women's Super Cup is an annual game, featuring the teams that won the Ghana Women's Premier League and the Ghana Women's FA Cup in the previous season. The first edition was contested on 23 April 2017 between Ampem Darkoa Ladies and Police Ladies at Baba Yara Sports Stadium, Kumasi. The game also signals the curtain opener for the new football season.

== List of finals ==
| Year | Winners | Score | Runners up |
|---|---|---|---|
| 2017 | Ampem Darkoa Ladies | 2–0 | Police Ladies |
| 2018 | Ampem Darkoa Ladies | 1–0 | Prisons Ladies |
| 2019 | Not held | | |
| 2020 | Not held | | |
| 2021 | | | |

=== Performance by club ===
| Club | Winners | Runners-up | Winning years |
|---|---|---|---|
| Ampem Darkoa Ladies | 2 | 0 | 2017, 2018 |
| Police Ladies | 0 | 1 | |
| Prisons Ladies | 0 | 1 | |

== See also ==
- Women's football in Ghana
- Ghana Women's Premier League
- Ghana Women's FA Cup
