= Comfort Yeboah =

Ghanaian footballer (born 2006)

Personal information
- Full name: Comfort Yeboah
- Date of birth: 17 December 2006 (age 19)
- Place of birth: Kumasi, Ghana
- Position: Forward

Team information
- Current team: Ampem Darkoa Ladies
- Number: 22

Senior career*
Years	Team	Apps	(Gls)
- Ampem Darkoa Ladies

International career
- Ghana U17
- Ghana U20
- * Club domestic league appearances and goals

Comfort Yeboah (born 17 December 2006) is a Ghanaian professional footballer who plays as a defender for the Ampem Darkoa Ladies and Ghana women's national football team.

== Career ==
She plays for both Ampem Darkoa Ladies in the CAF Women's Champions League and also the Black Princesses in the maiden edition of the WAFU B Girls Cup which was held in Kumasi. In the year 2023, Comfort was successfully named part of the team of the year for the 2023 CAF Women's Champions League which was held in Côte d'Ivoire.

In 2023, Yeboah was nominated for the CAF women's Young Player of the Year award. She finished amongst the top three but lost the award to Nesryne El Chad.

This nomination came as a result of her impressive CAF Women's Champions League performance with Ampem Darkoa. She helped push her team to the semi-final stage of the tournament. At the semi-final stage, she scored two goals for her side.

Yeboah is an Asante and her native dialect is the Asante Twi. In one of her international interviews with CAF TV, she was seen speaking confidently in Twi in a post-match interview with international media following her stellar performance during their CAF Women's Champions League campaign with Ampem Darkoa Ladies, which earned her the title of Woman of the Match.
