= Ainonvi FC =

Beninese women's football team

- Full name: Ainonvi Football Club
- League: Benin Women's Championship

Ainonvi Football Club is a Benin professional women's football club in Porto-Novo who plays in the Benin Women's Championship, the top tier of Beninese women's football.

== History ==
In the 2023–2024 season, Ainonvi FC secured their first Benin Women's Championship title. With this victory, Ainonvi earned a spot in the 2024 CAF Women's Champions League WAFU Zone B Qualifiers, where they will represent Benin in the competition.

== Honours ==
Type	Competition	Titles	Winning Seasons	Runners-up
Domestic	Benin Women's Championship	1	2024	

== See also ==
- Benin Women's Championship
- CAF Women's Champions League
