= Mary Berko =

Ghanaian footballer

Personal information
- Date of birth: 1 June 1988 (age 38)
- Position: Midfielder

Senior career*
| Years | Team | Apps | (Gls) |
- Police Accra

International career^{‡}
- Ghana
- * Club domestic league appearances and goals ‡ National team caps and goals as of 11 october 2014 (before the 2014 African Women's Championship)

Mary Berko (born 1 June 1988) is a Ghanaian footballer who plays as a midfielder for the Ghana women's national football team. She was part of the team at the 2014 African Women's Championship. At the club level, she played for Police Accra in Ghana.
