= Romaine Gandonou =

Beninese footballer (born 2010)

Personal information
- Full name: Romaine Yenido Gandonou
- Date of birth: 13 November 2010 (age 16)
- Place of birth: Akpro-Missérété, Benin
- Position: Forward

Team information
- Current team: Tambours FC
- Number: 7

Senior career*
Years	Team	Apps	(Gls)
2022–2023	Aigle Royal		
2023–	Tambours FC	35	(89)

International career^{‡}
- Benin U15
2024–	Benin U17	13	(15)
2025–	Benin U20	8	(17)
2025–	Benin	5	(5)
- * Club domestic league appearances and goals as of 26 February 2026 ‡ National team caps and goals as of 13 October 2026

Romaine Yenido Gandonou (born 13 November 2010) is a Beninese footballer who plays as striker for Tambours FC in Benin's Division 1 Féminine and the Benin national football teams across all categories.

== Early life ==
Born into a football-oriented environment, Gandonou began playing at a young age with her father, Victor Gandonou, a former player of Jeunesse Athlétique de Missérété. She developed her early technical foundation through regular training within a supportive family environment.

She initially engaged in multiple sports, notably athletics, which contributed to her speed and physical development. She later joined the Étoile FC Akpro-Missérété academy, where she competed in youth tournaments and developed her attacking profile.

== Club career ==
In 2021, Gandonou was selected following a talent identification campaign organised by Tambours FC. She was among the first recruits when the club launched its women's section. She began her senior career in the second division with Aigle Royal, helping the team secure promotion to the top flight during the 2022–23 season. She later returned to Tambours FC the following season.

In the 2023–24 season in the Beninese Division 2 Féminine (D2), she became the top scorer with 53 goals in 14 matches, playing a decisive role in the team's promotion. In the following season, competing in la division 1 féminine (D1), she scored 19 goals in 15 matches, again finishing as the league's leading scorer. and was later named best player and top scorer at the Trophées Footeuses 229, the main individual awards in Beninese women's football.

Following her performances during the African qualification campaign for the 2026 FIFA U-20 Women's World Cup, Gandonou travelled to France in May 2026 to undergo a trial with Paris Saint-Germain.

== International career ==
Gandonou has progressed through the youth ranks of the Benin national teams, having represented the under-15, under-17 and under-20 sides before being called up to the senior national team. She rose to prominence during the qualifying campaign for the 2026 FIFA U-20 Women's World Cup, in which she has scored 14 goals in six matches to finish as the competition's top scorer.

Her qualifying campaign has included four goals in a 5–1 win over Guinea and a hat-trick in a 4–0 victory against Egypt in Lomé, contributing to Benin's progression to the next round with a 5–0 aggregate score. In the final round, she scored in both legs against the Ivory Coast to help Benin secure qualification for their first-ever FIFA women's tournament.

In October 2025, at the age of 14, she received her first call-up to the senior national team (Les Amazones) for 2026 WAFCON qualifying matches against Nigeria. On 28 February, she scored her first senior international goal, converting a penalty in the 60th minute against Ivory Coast in a 2–1 defeat, after coming on as a substitute around the hour mark.

== International goals ==
No.	Date	Venue	Opponent	Score	Result	Competition
1.	28 February 2026	Felix Houphouet Boigny Stadium, Abidjan, Ivory Coast	Ivory Coast	1–2	1–2	Friendly
2.	8 October 2026	Stade de Kégué, Lomé, Togo	Mali	1–0	3–1	2028 CAF Women's Olympic qualifying tournament
3.	8 October 2026	Stade de Kégué, Lomé, Togo	Mali	2–0	3–1	2028 CAF Women's Olympic qualifying tournament
4.	13 October 2026	26 March Stadium, Bamako, Mali	Mali	3–1	2–6	2028 CAF Women's Olympic qualifying tournament
5.	13 October 2026	26 March Stadium, Bamako, Mali	Mali	2–3	2–6	2028 CAF Women's Olympic qualifying tournament
