= Taiwo Afolabi =

Nigerian business magnate and lawyer (born 1962)

- Born: Taiwo Olayinka Afolabi; April 29, 1962 (age 64); Ondo State, Nigeria
- Education: University of Lagos
- Occupations: business mogul; entrepreneur; lawyer
- Years active: 1981–present
- Organization: SIFAX Group
- Spouse: Folashade Afolabi

Taiwo Olayinka Afolabi (born April 29, 1962), MON, is a Nigerian business magnate and lawyer. He is the founder and Chief executive officer of SIFAX Group, a conglomerate that deals in Maritime, Aviation, Haulage, Hospitality, Financial Services and Oil and Gas.

== Early life and education ==
Afolabi was born as the first child of a set of twins in Ondo State, but he is a native of Idokunusi Ijebu in Ijebu East local government area of Ogun State, Nigeria. He completed his primary and secondary school education at Ansar Ud Deen Primary School, Ondo State, and Baptist Grammar School, Ibadan respectively. He later proceeded to the University of Lagos where he graduated with an LL.B. certificate in Law.

== Career ==
In 1981, he began his professional career with Nigerian Express Agencies Limited until 1988 when he left to establish SIFAX Group. Upon its establishment, the company has since risen to become one of Nigeria's leading companies with investments in oil and gas, haulage, logistics and maritime and aviation. He is a Fellow of the Nigeria Institute of Financial Management, and the Institute of Freight Forwarders of Nigeria.

== Recognitions ==
Afolabi is a Member of the Order of the Niger since 2010. In recognition of his contribution to the Nigerian industrial sector, he was awarded the 2014 "Businessman of the Year" by The Sun Awards. The Taiwo Afolabi Annual Maritime Conference (TAAM Conference) is organized in honor of Taiwo Afolabi by students of the University of Lagos and sponsored by SIFAX Group.

== Personal life ==
He is married to Folashade Afolabi and he is the father of Olayinka Afolabi and L.A.X. He is a member of the Institute of Directors Nigeria; Ikoyi Club 1938; IBB Golf Club, Abuja; the Building Committee of the Nigerian-British Chamber of Commerce and Industry, among many others.

Taiwo Afolabi is a sports lover, who enjoys watching and playing football.

== Philanthropy ==
His company SIFAX donated a one thousand seater (1,000) lecture hall to the Ladoke Akintola University of Technology (LAUTECH). A total of 184 persons have enjoyed free dental and medical care at the Taiwo Afolabi Free Rural Dental Outreach which was held at the popular Dugbe market in Ibadan recently. The beneficiaries included market men and women.
