= 2023 CAF Women's Champions League WAFU Zone B Qualifiers =

Tournament details
- Host country: Nigeria
- City: Benin City
- Dates: 18–31 August
- Teams: 7 (from 7 associations)
- Venue: 1 (in 1 host city)

Final positions
- Champions: (Ghana) Ampem Darkoa (1st title)
- Runners-up: (Nigeria) Delta Queens F.C.
- Third place: (Ivory Coast) Athlético FC d'Abidjan
- Fourth place: (Benin) Sam Nelly FC

Tournament statistics
- Matches played: 10
- Goals scored: 31 (3.1 per match)
- Top scorer: (Ghana) Mary Amponsah (7goals)
- All statistics correct as of 31 August 2023.

The 2023 CAF Women's Champions League WAFU Zone B Qualifiers was the third edition of the CAF Women's Champions League WAFU Zone B Qualifiers organized by the WAFU for the women's clubs of association nations. This edition was held from 18 to 31 August 2023 in Benin City, Nigeria. The tournament winners qualified automatically for the 2023 CAF Women's Champions League final tournament.

== Participating clubs ==
Team	Appearances	Previous best performance
(Ivory Coast) Athlético FC d'Abidjan	1st	n/a
(Benin) Sam Nelly FC	1st	n/a
(Ghana) Ampem Darkoa	2nd	Runner up (2022)
(Niger) AS Police (W)	3rd	Groupe stage (2021 and 2022)
(Burkina Faso) US Forces Armées	2nd	Fourth (2021)
(Togo) AS OTR Lomé	2nd	Third (2021)
(Nigeria) Delta Queens F.C.	1st	n/a

== Venues ==
Cities	Venues	Capacity
Benin City	Samuel Ogbemudia Stadium	

== Draw ==
The draw for this edition of the tournament was held on 5 July 2023 at 11:00 UTC (13:00 CAT) in Morocco. The seven teams were drawn into 2 group with teams finishing first and second in the groups qualifying for the knockout stages.

Group A	Group B
(Benin) Sam Nelly; (Ivory Coast) Athlético FC d'Abidjan; (Niger) AS Police	(Burkina Faso) US Forces Armées; (Ghana) Ampem Darkoa; (Nigeria) Delta Queens F.C.; (Togo) AS OTR Lomé

Due to the withdrawal of the club AS Police from Niger for reasons mentioned in a letter sent to the management of UFOA-B. A new draw will be made Friday, August 18, 2023 at 10:00 am at the Samuel Ogbemudia Stadium in Benin City.

Group A	Group B
(Benin) Sam Nelly; (Burkina Faso) US Forces Armées; (Nigeria) Delta Queens F.C.	(Ivory Coast) Athlético FC d'Abidjan; (Ghana) Ampem Darkoa; (Togo) AS OTR Lomé

== Group stage ==
Tiebreakers

Teams are ranked according to points (3 points for a win, 1 point for a draw, 0 points for a loss), and if tied on points, the following tiebreaking criteria are applied, in the order given, to determine the rankings.

1. Points in head-to-head matches among tied teams;
2. Goal difference in head-to-head matches among tied teams;
3. Goals scored in head-to-head matches among tied teams;
4. If more than two teams are tied, and after applying all head-to-head criteria above, a subset of teams are still tied, all head-to-head criteria above are reapplied exclusively to this subset of teams;
5. Goal difference in all group matches;
6. Goals scored in all group matches;
7. Penalty shoot-out if only two teams are tied and they met in the last round of the group;
8. Disciplinary points (yellow card = 1 point, red card as a result of two yellow cards = 3 points, direct red card = 3 points, yellow card followed by direct red card = 4 points);
9. Drawing of lots.

=== Group A ===
Pos	Team	Pld	W	D	L	GF	GA	GD	Pts	Qualification	DQ	SN	USFA
1	(Nigeria) Delta Queens F.C.	2	2	0	0	5	0	+5	6	Semi-finals	—	2–0	
2	(Benin) Sam Nelly	2	0	1	1	0	2	−2	1	Semi-finals		—	0–0
3	(Burkina Faso) US Forces Armées	2	0	1	1	0	3	−3	1		0–3		—

20 August 2023
15:00 UTC+1

US Forces Armées (Burkina Faso)	0–3	(Nigeria) Delta Queens F.C.
		Olabiyi 1'; Agoh 61'; Omokwo 78'

Samuel Ogbemudia Stadium, Benin City

22 August 2023
15:00 UTC+1

Sam Nelly (Benin)	0–0	(Burkina Faso) US Forces Armées

Samuel Ogbemudia Stadium, Benin City

25 August 2023
18:00 UTC+1

Delta Queens F.C. (Nigeria)	2–0	(Benin) Sam Nelly
Owoeye 34'; Ifituzue 54'

Samuel Ogbemudia Stadium, Benin City

=== Group B ===
Pos	Team	Pld	W	D	L	GF	GA	GD	Pts	Qualification	AD	AA	OTR
1	(Ghana) Ampem Darkoa	2	2	0	0	7	3	+4	6	Semi-finals	—		4–2
2	(Ivory Coast) Athlético FC d'Abidjan	2	1	0	1	3	3	0	3	Semi-finals	1–3	—	
3	(Togo) AS OTR Lomé	2	0	0	2	2	6	−4	0			0–2	—

20 August 2023
18:00 UTC+1

Ampem Darkoa (Ghana)	4–2	(Togo) AS OTR Lomé
Amponsah 1', 21', 55', 65'		Ufomba 18'; Tassa 90'

Samuel Ogbemudia Stadium, Benin City

22 August 2023
18:00 UTC+1

AS OTR Lomé (Togo)	0–2	(Ivory Coast) Athlético FC d'Abidjan
		Niamien 43 ', 57'

Samuel Ogbemudia Stadium, Benin City

25 August 2023
15:00 UTC+1

Athlético FC d'Abidjan (Ivory Coast)	1–3	(Ghana) Ampem Darkoa
Gnaly 83'		Amponsah 1', 15', 28'

Samuel Ogbemudia Stadium, Benin City

== Knockout stage ==
Semifinals
28 August – Benin City
(Nigeria) Delta Queens F.C.	3
(Ivory Coast) Athlético FC d'Abidjan	2
28 August – Benin City
(Ghana) Ampem Darkoa	4
(Benin) Sam Nelly	1

Final
31 August – Benin City
(Nigeria) Delta Queens F.C.	0
(Ghana) Ampem Darkoa	1
Third place
31 August – Benin City
(Ivory Coast) Athlético FC d'Abidjan	3
(Benin) Sam Nelly	0

=== Semi-finals ===
28 August 2023
15:00 UTC+1

Delta Queens F.C. (Nigeria)	3–2 (a.e.t.)	(Ivory Coast) Athlético FC d'Abidjan
Omokwo 64', 98'; Afolabi 106'		Behinan 5'; Sunday 114'

Samuel Ogbemudia Stadium, Benin City

28 August 2023
18:30 UTC+1

Ampem Darkoa (Ghana)	4–1	(Benin) Sam Nelly
Twum 1', 12'; M.Amponsah 19'; O.Amponsah 44'		Cloto 55'

Samuel Ogbemudia Stadium, Benin City

=== Third place match ===
30 August 2023
15:00 UTC+1

Athlético FC d'Abidjan (Ivory Coast)	3–0	(Benin) Sam Nelly
Niamien 24'; Gnaly 27'; Kalu ?'

Samuel Ogbemudia Stadium, Benin City

=== Final ===
31 August 2023

Delta Queens F.C. (Nigeria)	0–1	(Ghana) Ampem Darkoa
		Amponsah 43'

Samuel Ogbemudia Stadium, Benin City

=== Goalscorers ===
There have been 31 goals scored in 10 matches, for an average of 3.1 goals per match (as of 31 August 2023).

Rank	Player	Team	Goals
1	(Ghana) Mary Amponsah	(Ghana) Ampem Darkoa	8
2	(Nigeria) Mercy Omokwo	(Nigeria) Delta Queens F.C.	3
2	(Ivory Coast) Adjoua Edgwige Sandrine Niamien	(Ivory Coast) Athlético FC d'Abidjan	3
4	(Ghana) Tracey Twum	(Ghana) Ampem Darkoa	2
4	(Ivory Coast) Grewa Gnaly	(Ivory Coast) Athlético FC d'Abidjan	2
4	(Ghana) Ophelia Amponsah	(Ghana) Ampem Darkoa	2
7	(Nigeria) Alaba Olabiyi	(Nigeria) Delta Queens F.C.	1
7	(Nigeria) Chinaza Agoh	(Nigeria) Delta Queens F.C.	1
7	(Nigeria) Taiwo Afolabi	(Nigeria) Delta Queens F.C.	1
7	(Nigeria) Ifeoma Ifituzue	(Nigeria) Delta Queens F.C.	1
7	(Nigeria) Temilope Owoeye	(Nigeria) Delta Queens F.C.	1
7	(Togo) Chinwendu Ufomba	(Togo) AS OTR Lomé	1
7	(Togo) Senyebia Tassa	(Togo) AS OTR Lomé	1
7	(Ivory Coast) Favour Kalu	(Ivory Coast) Athlético FC d'Abidjan	1
7	(Ivory Coast) Melissa Behinan	(Ivory Coast) Athlético FC d'Abidjan	1
7	(Ivory Coast) Joy Sunday	(Ivory Coast) Athlético FC d'Abidjan	1
7	(Benin) Valentine Cloto	(Benin) Sam Nelly	1
