= Emem Essien =

Nigerian footballer (born 2001)

Personal information
- Full name: Emem Peace Essien
- Date of birth: 28 August 2001 (age 25)
- Place of birth: Nigeria
- Position: Forward

Senior career*
Years	Team	Apps	(Gls)
- Ibom Angels
- Sunshine Queens
- Bayelsa Queens
2021–2025	Edo Queens		
2025–2026	Kickstart FC		

International career
2025	Nigeria		
- * Club domestic league appearances and goals

Emem Peace Essien (born 28 August 2001) is a Nigerian professional women's football forward.

== Club career ==
After playing for clubs like Ibom Angels, Sunshine Queens and Bayelsa Queens, Emem Essien joined Edo Queens in 2021. She was crucial to Edo Queens performance in the 2023–24 which saw them win the league and qualify for the CAF Champions League for the first time. During that season, she scored 6 goals and was voted the season's Most Valuable Player.

At the qualifiers for the 2024 CAF Champions League, she finished as the top scorer with 6 goals. She further scored three goals at the main tournament; scoring at the group stage in wins over Ethiopian outfits CBE and Mamelodi Sundowns, where she won the Woman of the Match award the only goal in a loss against TP Mazembe in the semifinal. Her performance that year made her get nominated for the 2024 CAF Interclub Player of the Year.

The following season, she scored 7 goals in the 2024–25 NWFL, finishing as one of the top scorers.

In 2025, she rejoined Bayelsa Queens where she had a short stint with them, playing in the 2025 CAF Women's Champions League qualifiers. The same year, she joined Indian club Kickstart FC.

== National team career ==
In May 2025, she was called up for the Nigeria national football team in friendlies against Cameroon.

== Personal life ==
She comes from a family of nine children. She has declared her father to be her mentor.

== Honours ==
- NWFL Premiership: 2023–24
- NWFL MVP: 2024
