= Police Ladies F.C. (Ghana) =

Football club in Ghana

- Full name: Police Ladies Football Club
- Founded: 2007; 19 years ago
- Ground: McDan La Town Park, Accra
- Chairman: Lydia Yaako Donkor
- Coach: Franklin Oswald Sam
- League: Ghana Women's Premier League

Police Ladies Football Club is a Ghanaian professional women's football club based in Accra. The club features in the Ghana Women's Premier League. Over the years, the club has produced players for Ghana's various women's national teams including the Black Queens. Several players such as Fafali Dumehasi, Philicity Asuako, Deborah Afriyie, Henrietta Annie, and Beatrice Sasu have featured for the Black Queens in the past.

== History ==
The Police Ladies Football Club was formed by the Ghana Police Service in 2007. The club led by their coach the Late Chief Inspector Bright Attuquaye won the Ghana Women's FA Cup in 2016 after defeating Fabulous Ladies by 2–1 in the final.

During the 2024-25 Ghanaian football season, Police Ladies Football Club achieved a major milestone in the Southern Division of the Malta Guinness Women's Premier League. The club secured the Southern Zone championship after an 18-match league campaign. They finished two points ahead of Hasaacas Ladies. They entered the final matchday level on 36 points with Hasaacas Ladies but ahead on goal difference. A 2-0 victory over FC Epiphany Warriors at the Adjiriganor Astro Turf in Accra confirmed Police Ladies Football Club as Southern Zone champions.

The club later defeated defending champions Ampem Darkoa Ladies 2-0 in the Ghana Women's Premier League championship playoff at the University of Ghana Stadium to claim their maiden league title. Goals from Jane Ayieyam and Victoria Teye Williams secured the league trophy for the club.

== Outside Ghana ==
Following their maiden Ghana Women's Premier League title in the 2024-25 season, Police Ladies FC qualified to represent Ghana in the WAFU Zone B qualifiers for the 2025 CAF Women's Champions League. The competition marked the club's first opportunity to compete for a place in Africa's top women's club football tournament.

Police Ladies' qualification hopes ended after a 4-1 defeat to Ivorian champions ASEC Mimosas in the semi-final of the WAFU Zone B qualifiers on 2 September 2025 at the Charles Konan Banny Stadium. The result meant Police Ladies Football Club missed out on qualification for the CAF Women's Champions League final tournament.

== Grounds ==
The club plays their home matches at the McDan La Town Park. In May 2020, the club announced the construction of an artificial turf at the Police Training and Academy School in Tesano, Accra.

== Honours ==
=== Domestic ===
- Ghana Women's FA Cup
Winners (record) (1): 2016
- Ghana Women's Premier League

Winners (record) (1): 2024-25

== Management ==
Position	Name
Chairperson	COP Lydia Yaako Donkor

== Notable players ==
For details on notable Police Ladies F.C. footballers see Category:Police Ladies F.C. (Ghana) players.

== See also ==
- Women's football in Ghana
