= Zouwaira Souley Sani =

Nigerien football referee

Zouwaira Souley Sani is a Nigerien football referee.

== Early life ==
She started refereeing in 2017.

== Career ==
She has shown her skill at the 2019 All African Games held in Morocco. In 2019, she also gained valuable experience through internship programs conducted in Egypt, Gabon, and Morocco". She has also refereed at 2022 Women's Africa Cup of Nations qualification.
