= Habibou Ouédraogo =

Ivorian footballer (born 2002)

Personal information
- Date of birth: February 18, 2002 (age 24)
- Place of birth: Ivory Coast
- Height: 1.82 m (6 ft 0 in)
- Positions: Midfielder; forward

Team information
- Current team: Marseille

Youth career
- 2017–2018: EFA Espoir

Senior career*
Years	Team	Apps	(Gls)
2019–2021	Jeunesse FC		
2021–2022	Danta AC	18	(19)
2022–2023	FC Inter d'Abidjan	18	(20)
2024–2026	ASEC Mimosas	67	(112)
2026	Marseille	6	(2)

International career
2022	Burkina Faso	0	(0)
2025–	Ivory Coast	6	(4)
- * Club domestic league appearances and goals

Habibou Ouédraogo (born 18 February 2002) is a Burkinabé-Ivorian professional footballer who plays as a Attacking midfielder for Marseille of the Première Ligue (D1) and the Ivory Coast national team.

== Club career ==
Ouédraogo began her football training in 2017 at the EFA Espoir Académie Football Club Songon, a football training center established in 2016 in Yopougon, Abidjan. Primarily an offensive midfielder, Ouédraogo quickly demonstrated technical ability, game intelligence, and versatility, capable of both orchestrating play and contributing to the attack.

From 2019 to 2021, she played for Jeunesse Football Club de Marcory before moving to Burkina Faso to join Danta AC in 2021. During her single season with Danta AC, she scored 19 goals and provided 8 assists, drawing attention from FC Inter d'Abidjan.

Ouédraogo joined FC Inter for the 2022–2023 season, becoming an undisputed starter, recording 20 goals and 4 assists. Known for her strong physique and technical skills, she has been described as a promising Ivorian-Burkinabé talent with ambitions to play professionally in Europe.

Ouédraogo participated with the club in their inaugural 2025 CAF Women's Champions League WAFU Zone B Qualifiers, helping the team secure the title by scoring three goals. She finished as joint top scorer and became the first player from the club to score at this stage of the competition.

On 9 November 2025, she became the first player from the club to score in the Champions League, delivering the match-winning goal against the defending champions TP Mazembe. She helped the club reach their first final in their debut by scoring three goals along the way, ultimately finishing as the club's top scorer and being named the competition's most valuable player, despite losing in the final.

== International career ==
Born in Ivory Coast, Ouédraogo is of Burkinabé descent and holds dual nationalities.

At 20 years old, while based in Burkina Faso, Ouédraogo was selected for the final Etalons Dames squad at the 2022 Women's Africa Cup of Nations. After being sidelined by the coaching staff during the competition, she returned to Ivory Coast and did not play again for or in Burkina Faso.

She received her first call-up to the senior Ivorian team in April 2025 for two friendly matches against Kenya; however, she was unable to participate due to administrative formalities, as her naturalization process had not yet been finalized. By the May-June window, her change of nationality was completed, making her eligible to represent Ivory Coast.

In late May 2025, Ouédraogo was called again to the squad for friendlies against Ghana. On 30 May 2025, she made her debut for the team, coming on as a substitute. And on 3 June 2025, she scored her first international goal against the Black Queens, securing a victory for the Elephantes.

=== International goals ===
No.	Date	Venue	Opponent	Score	Result	Competition
1.	9 April 2026	Alassane Ouattara Stadium, Abidjan, Ivory Coast	Mauritania	5–0	8–0	2026 FIFA Series
2.	9 April 2026	Alassane Ouattara Stadium, Abidjan, Ivory Coast	Mauritania	6–0	8–0	2026 FIFA Series
3.	16 April 2026	Alassane Ouattara Stadium, Abidjan, Ivory Coast	Pakistan	2–0	2–0	2026 FIFA Series

== Honours ==
Individual

- CAF Women's Champions League Player of the Tournament: 2025
