= ASEC Mimosas (women) =

Ivorian professional women's football team in Abidjan

- Nicknames: les Fleurs Mimosas; Les Jaunes et Noirs
- Founded: December 2022; 3 years ago
- Stadium: Various; Abidjan
- President: Roger Ouégnin
- Head coach: Siaka Traoré
- League: Ivorian Division 1 féminine
- 2024–25: D1, 1st of 14 (champions)
- Website: asec.ci
Home colours	Away colours

Association Sportive des Employés de Commerce Mimosas (commonly abbreviated as ASEC Mimosas) is the women's football team of its namesake club, based in Abidjan. The team competes in the Ivorian Division 1 féminine, the highest level of women's football in the country.

== History ==
In late 2022, the women's section of ASEC Mimosas was established ahead of the 2022–23 season following a talent detection session held on 15 December 2022 at Sol Béni. The initiative, led by club president Roger Ouégnin, aimed to form a competitive squad and promote the development of women's football within the club and in line with the CAF regulations requiring teams participating in the CAF Champions League to maintain a women's team. For their inaugural season in Division 2, Adélaïde Koudougnon was appointed as head coach, bringing her experience as a former national team player and pioneer of women's football in Ivory Coast. In 2023, competing in Division 2, ASEC Mimosas dominated their group, winning all four matches with a remarkable +57 goal difference, securing promotion to Division 1 féminine. Although they lost 1–0 to Teco FC in the Division 2 final, ASEC was later awarded the title administratively after it was determined that their opponents had fielded more foreign players than the permitted quota.

In their debut top-flight campaign, ASEC Mimosas played their first Division 1 match on 15 November 2023, recording a commanding 7–1 victory over the 2021 champions Africa Sports. Living up to their reputation, the team went on to finish the season as runners-up.

In the following season, ASEC demonstrated greater stability and excellence, culminating in their first-ever Ivorian championship title after losing only once in 26 matches. Their domestic triumph was followed by success in the 2025 CAF Women's Champions League WAFU Zone B Qualifiers, where they went unbeaten to claim the regional crown and secure qualification for the final tournament in Egypt. With this achievement, ASEC became the first Ivorian club to win the qualifiers and reach the continental finals on merit.

== Players and staff ==
=== Current squad ===
As of 8 November 2025

No.	Pos.	Nation	Player
1	GK	CIV	Marie-Viviane Aké
2	DF	CIV	Orlane Essis
3	DF	CIV	Aboa Yapo
4	DF	CIV	Noura Diarra
5	DF	CIV	Anastasie Gbéhi
6	MF	CIV	Erika Gnounoué (Captain)
7	FW	CIV	Habibou Ouédraogo
8	MF	CIV	Yeti Doudou Touré
10	MF	GHA	Amavi Huviezo
11	FW	CIV	Ami Diallo

No.	Pos.	Nation	Player
12	FW	CIV	Minouzan Tra Lou
13	DF	CIV	Aïcha Fofana
14	DF	CIV	Mariam Diawara
15	MF	CIV	Essi Dagba
16	GK	BFA	Nina Dabilgou
17	FW	CIV	Naomie Abbé
18	DF	CIV	Naomie Kouassi
19	MF	CIV	Nadège N'Guessan
20	FW	CIV	Sopie Brou
21	MF	CIV	Yasmine Timité
22	FW	CIV	Korotoum Koné

=== Coaching staff ===
As of 12 November 2025

Position	Staff
Head coach	Siaka Traoré "Gigi"
Assistant coach	Bakary Doumbia
Goalkeeping coach	Christophe Aïfimi
Doctor	Nina Mah Talé
Physiotherapist	Marie-Paule Iritie-Lou

== Honors ==
=== Domestic ===
- Ivorian Division 1 féminine

Winners (1): 2024–25
Runners-up (1): 2023–24

- Ivorian Division 2 féminine

Winners (1): 2023

=== International ===
- CAF Women's Champions League

Runner-up (1): 2025

- WAFU Zone B Women's Champions League

Winners (1): 2025

== See also ==
- ASEC Mimosas
