= 2022 CAF Women's Champions League WAFU Zone B Qualifiers =

Tournament details
- Host country: Ivory Coast
- City: Yamoussoukro
- Dates: 20 August – 2 September
- Teams: 7 (from 7 associations)
- Venue: 2 (in 1 host city)

Final positions
- Champions: (Nigeria) Bayelsa Queens F.C. (1st title)
- Runners-up: (Ghana) Ampem Darkoa
- Third place: (Ivory Coast) Africa Sports
- Fourth place: (Benin) Espoir FC

Tournament statistics
- Matches played: 11
- Goals scored: 41 (3.73 per match)
- Top scorer: (Nigeria) Etim Edidiong (6 goals)

Qualification for the 2022 CAF Women's Champions League for West African Football Union (WAFU) Zone B took place in Yamoussoukro, Ivory Coast between 20 August and 2 September 2022 to qualify its representative at the group stage in Morocco. Originally scheduled to be held in Abidjan, this edition was moved due to then-ongoing renovations at the stadiums situated there.

== Participating clubs ==
Team	Appearances	Previous best performance
(Ivory Coast) Africa Sports	1st	n/a
(Benin) Espoir FC	1st	n/a
(Ghana) Ampem Darkoa	1st	n/a
(Niger) AS Police	2nd	Groupe stage(2021)
(Burkina Faso) US Forces Armées	2nd	Fourth (2021)
(Togo) Athleta FC	1st	n/a
(Nigeria) Bayelsa Queens F.C.	1st	n/a

== Venues ==
Cities	Venues	Capacity
Yamoussoukro	Stade de Yamoussoukro	20,000

== Draw ==
The draw for this edition of the tournament was held on 20 July 2022 at 11:00 UTC (13:00 CAT) in Morocco. The seven teams were drawn into 2 group with teams finishing first and second in the groups qualifying for the knockout stages.

Group A	Group B
(Benin) Espoir FC; (Ivory Coast) Africa Sports; (Niger) AS Police	(Burkina Faso) US Forces Armées; (Ghana) Ampem Darkoa; (Nigeria) Bayelsa Queens; (Togo) Athleta FC

== Group stage ==
Tiebreakers

Teams are ranked according to points (3 points for a win, 1 point for a draw, 0 points for a loss), and if tied on points, the following tiebreaking criteria are applied, in the order given, to determine the rankings.

1. Points in head-to-head matches among tied teams;
2. Goal difference in head-to-head matches among tied teams;
3. Goals scored in head-to-head matches among tied teams;
4. If more than two teams are tied, and after applying all head-to-head criteria above, a subset of teams are still tied, all head-to-head criteria above are reapplied exclusively to this subset of teams;
5. Goal difference in all group matches;
6. Goals scored in all group matches;
7. Penalty shoot-out if only two teams are tied and they met in the last round of the group;
8. Disciplinary points (yellow card = 1 point, red card as a result of two yellow cards = 3 points, direct red card = 3 points, yellow card followed by direct red card = 4 points);
9. Drawing of lots.

All times are Time in Ivory Coast (UTC+0).

=== Group A ===
Pos	Team	Pld	W	D	L	GF	GA	GD	Pts	Qualification	ASA	EFC	ASP
1	(Ivory Coast) Africa Sports	2	2	0	0	8	1	+7	6	Semi-finals	—		5–0
2	(Benin) Espoir FC	2	1	0	1	3	4	−1	3	Semi-finals	1–3	—	
3	(Niger) AS Police	2	0	0	2	1	7	−6	0			1–2	—

20 August 2022
15:00

Africa Sports (Ivory Coast)	5-0	(Niger) AS Police
Edwige 14'; Abrogoua 24'; Esperance 36'; Doudou 69'; Deborah 80'	Report

Stade de Yamoussoukro, Yamoussoukro

23 August 2022
15:00

AS Police (Niger)	1-2	(Benin) Espoir FC
Mamadou 82'	Report	Zinsou 21', 90'

Stade de Yamoussoukro, Yamoussoukro

26 August 2022
16:00

Africa Sports (Ivory Coast)	3-1	(Benin) Espoir FC
Akebie Abrogoua ??'; Adjoua Edwige ??'; Estelle Grewa ??'	Report	Merveille Zinsou ??'

Stade de Yamoussoukro, Yamoussoukro

=== Group B ===
Pos	Team	Pld	W	D	L	GF	GA	GD	Pts	Qualification	AD	BFC	USFA	AFC
1	(Ghana) Ampem Darkoa	3	2	1	0	4	0	+4	7	Semi-finals	—	0–0	3–0	
2	(Nigeria) Bayelsa Queens	3	2	1	0	8	1	+7	7	Semi-finals		—	3–1	
3	(Burkina Faso) USFA	3	1	0	2	6	4	+2	3				—	5–1
4	(Togo) Athleta FC	3	0	0	3	1	11	−10	0		0–1	0–5		—

21 August 2022
15:00

Ampem Darkoa (Ghana)	3-0	(Burkina Faso) USFA
E.Owusu 6'; Ouattara 44', .og'; M.Owusu 89'	Report

Stade de Yamoussoukro, Yamoussoukro
21 August 2022
18:00

(Togo) Athleta FC	0-5	(Nigeria) Bayelsa Queens
	Report	Miracle 6'; Belssing 8'; Mercy 64', 78', 89'

Stade de Yamoussoukro, Yamoussoukro

24 August 2022
15:00

USFA (Burkina Faso)	5-1	(Togo) Athleta FC
Compaoré ?'; Ilboudo ?'; Millogo ?'; Sawadogo ?'; Sawadogo ?'	Report	Bendoukilou ?'

Stade de Yamoussoukro, Yamoussoukro
24 August 2022
18:00

Bayelsa Queens (Nigeria)	0-0	(Ghana) Ampem Darkoa
	Report

Stade de Yamoussoukro, Yamoussoukro

27 August 2022
16:00

Ampem Darkoa (Ghana)	1-0	(Togo) Athleta FC
Mavis Owusu ?'

Stade INHP
27 August 2022
16:00

Bayelsa Queens (Nigeria)	3-1	USFA (Burkina Faso)
Etim Belssing ?'; Flourish Sabastine ?'; Aderami Shola ?'		?'

Stade de Yamoussoukro, Yamoussoukro

== Knockout stage ==
Semifinals
30 August –
(Ivory Coast) Africa Sports	1(5)
(Ghana) Ampem Darkoa	1(6)
30 August –
(Nigeria) Bayelsa Queens	6
(Benin) Espoir FC	0

Final
3 September –
(Ghana) Ampem Darkoa	0
(Nigeria) Bayelsa Queens	3
Third place
3 September –
(Ivory Coast) Africa Sports	4
(Benin) Espoir FC	0

=== Semi-finals ===
31 August 2022
15:00

Africa Sports (Ivory Coast)	1–1 (a.e.t.)	(Ghana) Ampem Darkoa
Penalties
	5–6

31 August 2022
18:30

Bayelsa Queens (Nigeria)	6–0	(Benin) Espoir FC

=== Third place match ===
3 September 2022
15:00

Africa Sports (Ivory Coast)	4-0	(Benin) Espoir FC

=== Final ===
3 September 2022
18:30

Ampem Darkoa (Ghana)	0-3	(Nigeria) Bayelsa Queens

== Awards and statistics ==
=== Goalscorers ===
There have been 32 goals scored in 14 matches, for an average of 2.29 goals per match (as of 1 September 2022).

Rank	Player	Team	Goals
1	(Nigeria) Etim Edidiong	(Nigeria) Bayelsa Queens	6
2	(Ivory Coast) Adjoua Edwige Sandrine	(Ivory Coast) Africa Sports	3
3	(Benin) Adjouvi Zonsou	(Benin) Espoir FC	2
3	(Ghana) Mavis Owusu	(Ghana) Ampem Darkoa	2
3	(Nigeria) Chinyere Igboamalu	(Nigeria) Bayelsa Queens FC	2
6	(Nigeria) Joseph Miracle	(Nigeria) Bayelsa Queens FC	1
7	(Nigeria) Flourish Sebastine	(Nigeria) Bayelsa Queens	1
8	(Nigeria) Adeyemi Mary	(Nigeria) Bayelsa Queens	1
9	(Nigeria) Kafayat Bashiru	(Nigeria) Bayelsa Queens	1
10	(Nigeria) Glory Edet	(Nigeria) Bayelsa Queens	1
11	(Nigeria) Anjor Mary	(Nigeria) Bayelsa Queens	1
12	(Ivory Coast) Akebe Abrougoua	(Ivory Coast) Africa Sports	1
13	(Ivory Coast) Cousso Esperance	(Ivory Coast) Africa Sports	1
14	(Ivory Coast) Yeti Doudou	(Ivory Coast) Africa Sports	1
15	(Ivory Coast) Ange Deborah	(Ivory Coast) Africa Sports	1
16	(Ivory Coast) Grewa Estelle	(Ivory Coast) Africa Sports	1
17	(Ivory Coast) Abrougoua	(Ivory Coast) Africa Sports	1
18	(Niger) Fatimata Mamadou	(Niger) AS Police	1
19	(Benin) Merrveille	(Benin) Espoir FC	1
20	(Ghana) Gladys Amfobea	(Ghana) Ampem Darkoa	1
21	(Burkina Faso) Sara Ilboudo	(Burkina Faso) USFA	1
22	(Ghana) Charlotte Millogo	(Ghana) USFA	1
23	(Burkina Faso) Mouniratou Compaore	(Burkina Faso) USFA	1
24	(Burkina Faso) Balkissa Sawadogo	(Burkina Faso) USFA	1
25	(Burkina Faso) Rasmata Sawadogo	(Burkina Faso) USFA	1
26	(Burkina Faso) Lala Traore	(Burkina Faso) USFA	1

- own goal: (Burkina Faso) Mariam Ouattara
