= Janet Akekoromowei =

Nigerian footballer

Personal information
- Full name: Seimeyeha Janet Akekoromowei
- Date of birth: 6 November 2007 (age 19)
- Place of birth: Ese-Odo, Ondo State, Nigeria
- Height: 1.70 m (5 ft 7 in)
- Position: Striker

Team information
- Current team: S.L. Benfica
- Number: 24

Youth career
- Asisat Oshoala Academy

Senior career*
Years	Team	Apps	(Gls)
2024−2025	Nasarawa Amazons	19	(13)
2025-2026	Bayelsa Queens		(6+)
2026-	S.L. Benfica		

International career^{‡}
2022	Nigeria U20	15	(7)
2026–	Nigeria	1	(0)
- * Club domestic league appearances and goals as of 30 June 2026 ‡ National team caps and goals as of 15 October 2026

Seimeyeha Janet Akekoromowei (born 6 November 2007) is a Nigerian footballer who plays as a striker for S.L. Benfica in the Campeonato Nacional Feminino in Portugal. She has represented Nigeria at youth international level with the Falconets, the Nigeria women's national under-20 football team. She gained recognition following her performances in the NWFL and her participation in the FIFA U-20 Women's World Cup and 2026 FIFA U-20 Women's World Cup qualifiers.

== Early life and education ==
Akekoromowei was born in Ese-Odo, Ondo State, Nigeria, and was raised in Lagos State. She is the last of eleven children. She attended Police Children School and Command Secondary School in Lagos.

== Football career ==
=== Nasarawa Amazons ===
Akekoromowei played for Nasarawa Amazons in the Nigeria Women Football League. During the 2024–25 NWFL season, she emerged as one of the league's top performers and finished as the second-highest goalscorer with 13 goals in 19 matches. She was also named the league's Most Valuable Player (MVP).

=== Bayelsa Queens ===
In July 2025, Akekoromowei signed for Bayelsa Queens from Nasarawa Amazons ahead of the 2025–26 season. The transfer was announced as part of Bayelsa Queens' preparations for the CAF Women's Champions League and NWFL campaign. Following her move, she became a key player for the club, contributing goals and assists in domestic and regional competitions. During the 2025 WAFU B Women's Champions League qualifiers, she scored important goals for Bayelsa Queens and received Player of the Match recognition in matches against Sam-Nelly FC and USFA. Despite an ankle injury she suffered while on international duty which limited her appearances for Bayelsa Queens, she was still voted the NWFL Premiership Matchday One Top Performer during the 2025–26 season.

=== Benfica ===
Reports in 2026 linked her with potential moves to European clubs including FC Barcelona Femení, S.L. Benfica, and PSG, although she stated her immediate focus was on helping Nigeria qualify for the FIFA U-20 Women's World Cup. On 21 July 2026, she signed for Benfica in a two-year deal, with an option for a further year extension.

== International career ==
Akekoromowei has represented Nigeria at youth level with the Falconets. She was part of Nigeria's squad for the 2024 FIFA U-20 Women's World Cup in Colombia and made three appearances during the tournament.

She later featured prominently during the 2026 FIFA U-20 Women's World Cup qualification campaign, scoring in qualifying matches against Rwanda and participating in preparatory matches for the team. However, in a qualifying game against Senegal, she suffered an ankle injury, which ruled her out of the rest of the qualifying series.

On 25 August 2026, she was included in the Falconets' squad for the 2026 FIFA U-20 Women's World Cup in Poland. However, due to issues with completing her paperwork with Benfica, she would miss Nigeria's first game of the tournament against Spain. On October 9, 2026, she made her Super Falcons debut, coming on as a second half substitute in Nigeria's Olympic qualifier first leg match against Comoros which Nigeria won 2−0.

== Playing style ==
Akekoromowei has been described in Nigerian sports media as a prolific forward known for her finishing ability, attacking intelligence and pace.

== Honours and awards ==
=== Nigeria Women Football League Most Valuable Player: 2024–25 ===
NWFL Premiership Matchday One Top Performer: 2025–26
