= 2021 CAF Women's Champions League WAFU Zone B Qualifiers =

Tournament details
- Host country: Ivory Coast
- City: Abidjan
- Dates: 24 July to 5 August
- Teams: 7 (from 7 associations)
- Venue: 1 (in 1 host city)

Final positions
- Champions: (Ghana) Hasaacas Ladies (1st title)
- Runners-up: (Nigeria) Rivers Angels FC
- Third place: (Togo) AS OTR Lomé

Tournament statistics
- Matches played: 10
- Goals scored: 30 (3 per match)
- Top scorer: (Nigeria) Maryann Ezenagu (5 goals)

The 2021 CAF Women's Champions League WAFU Zone B Qualifiers was the inaugural edition of the WAFU Zone B women's club football qualifier tournament organized by the WAFU for the women's clubs of association nations. This edition was held from 24 July to 5 August 2021 in Abidjan, Ivory Coast. The winners of the tournament qualified automatically for the 2021 CAF Women's Champions League final tournament, that was held in Egypt.

== Participating teams ==
Team	Qualifying method	Appearances	Previous best performance
(Ivory Coast) Onze Sœurs de Gagnoa	2019 Ivory Coast Women's Championship Champions	1st	n/a
(Ghana) Hasaacas Ladies	2020–21 Ghana Women's Premier League Champions	1st	n/a
(Niger) AS Police	2019 Niger Women's Championship Champions	1st	n/a
(Burkina Faso) USFA	2018–19 Burkinabé Women's Championship Champions	1st	n/a
(Togo) AS OTR Lomé	2018–19 Togolese Women's Championship Champions	1st	n/a
(Nigeria) Rivers Angels	2020–21 NWFL Premiership Champions	1st	n/a

== Match officials ==
=== Referees ===
- (Nigeria) Yemisi Akintoye
- (Niger) Nafissa Iro Sari
- (Benin) Kayodé Laurande Offin
- (Burkina Faso) Jacqueline Nikiema
- (Ivory Coast) Zomadre Kore
- (Togo) Edoh Kindedji

=== Assistant referees ===
- (Nigeria) Mfon Akpan
- (Niger) Hawa Douno Moussa
- (Benin) Nafissatou Yekini Shitou
- (Ivory Coast) Lou Prisca Danielle Ta
- (Ivory Coast) Edwige Appia
- (Ghana) Alice Farizua Chakule

== Group stage ==
Tiebreakers

Teams are ranked according to points (3 points for a win, 1 point for a draw, 0 points for a loss). If tied on points, the following tiebreaking criteria are applied, in the order given, to determine the rankings.

1. Points in head-to-head matches among tied teams;
2. Goal difference in head-to-head matches among tied teams;
3. Goals scored in head-to-head matches among tied teams;
4. If more than two teams are tied, and after applying all head-to-head criteria above, a subset of teams are still tied, all head-to-head criteria above are reapplied exclusively to this subset of teams;
5. Goal difference in all group matches;
6. Goals scored in all group matches;
7. Penalty shoot-out if only two teams are tied and they met in the last round of the group;
8. Disciplinary points (yellow card = 1 point, red card as a result of two yellow cards = 3 points, direct red card = 3 points, yellow card followed by direct red card = 4 points);
9. Drawing of lots.

=== Group A ===
Pos	Team	Pld	W	D	L	GF	GA	GD	Pts	Qualification
1	(Burkina Faso) US Forces Armées	2	2	0	0	3	1	+2	6	SemiFinal
2	(Togo) AS OTR Lomé	2	0	1	1	3	4	−1	1	SemiFinal
3	(Ivory Coast) Onze Sœurs de Gagnoa (H)	2	0	1	1	2	3	−1	1	

(H) Hosts
24 July 2021
16:00

Onze Sœurs de Gagnoa (Ivory Coast)	0–1	(Burkina Faso) US Forces Armées
	Report	Tamboura 43'

Stade Robert Champroux, Marcory
Attendance: 0 (close doors)
Referee: Edoh Kindedji (Togo)

27 July 2021
16:00

AS OTR Lomé (Togo)	2–2	(Ivory Coast) Onze Sœurs de Gagnoa
Yapi 28' (o.g.); Badate 38'	Report	Ouedraogo 8'; Kreto 39'

Stade Robert Champroux, Marcory
Attendance: 0 (close doors)
Referee: Yemisi Akintoye (Nigeria)

30 July 2021
16:00

US Forces Armées (Burkina Faso)	2–1	(Togo) AS OTR Lomé
Omolatcho 8' (o.g.); Kie 83'	Report	Tassa 17'

Stade Robert Champroux, Marcory
Attendance: 0 (close doors)
Referee: Nafissa Iro Sani (Niger)

=== Group B ===
Pos	Team	Pld	W	D	L	GF	GA	GD	Pts	Qualification
1	(Nigeria) Rivers Angels F.C.	2	2	0	0	7	0	+7	6	SemiFinal
2	(Ghana) Hasaacas Ladies	2	1	0	1	3	2	+1	3	SemiFinal
3	(Niger) AS Police	2	0	0	2	0	8	−8	0	

24 July 2021
19:00

Rivers Angels F.C. (Nigeria)	2–0	(Ghana) Hasaacas Ladies
Abiodun 17'; Ezenagu 53'	Report

Stade Robert Champroux, Marcory
Attendance: 0 (close doors)
Referee: Zomadre Kore (Ivory Coast)

27 July 2021
19:00

AS Police (Niger)	0–5	(Nigeria) Rivers Angels F.C.
	Report	Oghenebrume 13', 60'; Ogebe 35'; Ezenagu 44', 76'

Stade Robert Champroux, Marcory
Attendance: 0 (close doors)
Referee: Kayodé Laurande Offin (Benin)

30 July 2021
19:00

Hasaacas Ladies (Ghana)	3–0	(Niger) AS Police
Boaduwaa 23'; Pokuaa 44', 73'	Report

Stade Robert Champroux, Marcory
Attendance: 0 (close doors)
Referee: Jacqueline Nikiema (Burkina Faso)

== Knockout stage ==
Semifinals
2 August – Marcory
(Burkina Faso) US Forces Armées	0
(Ghana) Hasaacas Ladies	2
2 August – Marcory
(Nigeria) Rivers Angels	5
(Togo) AS OTR Lomé	1

Final
5 August – Marcory
(Ghana) Hasaacas Ladies	3
(Nigeria) Rivers Angels	1
Third place
5 August – Marcory
(Burkina Faso) US Forces Armées	0
(Togo) AS OTR Lomé	2

=== Semifinals ===
2 August 2021
15:30

US Forces Armées (Burkina Faso)	0–2	(Ghana) Hasaacas Ladies
	Report	Badu 44'; Boaduwaa 59'

Stade Robert Champroux, Marcory
Attendance: 0 (close doors)
Referee: Nafissa Iro Sani (Niger)

2 August 2021
19:00

Rivers Angels F.C. (Nigeria)	5–1	(Togo) AS OTR Lomé
Abiodun 16'; Ezenagu Ogochukwu 21', 78'; Iyabo 65'; Onyedikachi 67'	Report	Badate 73' (pen.)

Stade Robert Champroux, Marcory
Attendance: 0 (close doors)
Referee: Kayodé Laurande Offin (Benin)

=== Third place match ===
5 August 2021
15:30

US Forces Armées (Burkina Faso)	0–2	(Togo) AS OTR Lomé
	report(CAF)	Sama 35'; Aboudou 54'

Stade Robert Champroux, Marcory
Attendance: 0 (close doors)
Referee: Yemisi Akintoye (Nigeria)

=== Final ===
5 August 2021
19:00

Hasaacas Ladies (Ghana)	3–1	(Nigeria) Rivers Angels F.C.
Appiah 1'; Agyekum 41'; Bugre 57'	report (CAF)	Ikechukwu 10'

Stade Robert Champroux, Marcory
Attendance: 0 (close doors)
Referee: Jacqueline Nikiema (Burkina Faso)

== Awards and statistics ==
=== Goalscorers ===
As of 28 August 2021

Rank	Player	Team	Goals
1	(Nigeria) Maryann Ezenagu	(Nigeria) Rivers Angels F.C.	5
2	(Ghana) Millot Abena Pokuaa	(Ghana) Hasaacas Ladies F.C.	2
2	(Nigeria) Deborah Abiodun	(Nigeria) Rivers Angels F.C.	2
2	(Nigeria) Vivian Ikechukwu	(Nigeria) Rivers Angels F.C.	2
2	(Ghana) Doris Boaduwaa	(Ghana) Hasaacas Ladies F.C.	2
2	(Nigeria) Ikekhua Osaretin Oghenebrume	(Nigeria) Rivers Angels F.C.	2
2	(Togo) Nathalie Badate	(Togo) AS OTR Lomé	2
7	(Burkina Faso) Fatoumata Tamboura	(Burkina Faso) US Forces Armées	1
7	(Ivory Coast) Priscille Kreto	(Ivory Coast) Onze Sœurs de Gagnoa	1
7	(Ivory Coast) Habiba Ouedraogo	(Ivory Coast) Onze Sœurs de Gagnoa	1
7	(Togo) Rachida Aboudou	(Togo) AS OTR Lomé	1
7	(Togo) Koudjoukalo Sama	(Togo) AS OTR Lomé	1
7	(Burkina Faso) Charlotte Kie	(Burkina Faso) US Forces Armées	1
7	(Togo) Senyebia Tassa	(Togo) AS OTR Lomé	1
7	(Nigeria) Koku Iyabo	(Nigeria) Rivers Angels F.C.	1
7	(Nigeria) Cynthia Onyedikachi	(Nigeria) Rivers Angels F.C.	1
7	(Ghana) Evelyn Badu	(Ghana) Hasaacas Ladies F.C.	1
7	(Ghana) Veronica Appiah	(Ghana) Hasaacas Ladies F.C.	1
7	(Ghana) Perpetual Agyekum	(Ghana) Hasaacas Ladies F.C.	1
7	(Ghana) Azumah Bugre	(Ghana) Hasaacas Ladies F.C.	1

=== Own goals ===
Rank	Player	Team	Goals
1	(Togo) Ella Omolatcho	(Togo) AS OTR Lomé	1
1	(Ivory Coast) Élodie Inès Yapi	(Ivory Coast) Onze Sœurs de Gagnoa	1
