= Benin Women's Championship =

- Founded: 2002; 24 years ago
- Country: Benin
- Confederation: CAF
- Number of clubs: 18
- Relegation to: W-Championship D2
- International cup: CAF W-Champions League
- Current champions: Ainonvi FC (1st title) (2023-24)
- Current: 2025–26 W-Championship

The Benin Women's Championship is the top flight of women's association football in Benin. The competition is run by the Benin Football Federation.

== History ==
The first Benin women's championship was contested on 2002. It was won by Flèche Noire SC.

== Champions ==
The list of champions and runners-up:

Year	Champions	Runners-up
2002	Flèche Noire SC	Black Stones FC
2003	not held	
2004	not held	
2005	not held	
2005–06	Jeanne d’Arc FC	AO Avrankou Babies
2006–07	not held	
2007–08	not held	
2008–09	not held	
2009–10	not held	
2010–11	not held	
2011–12	not held	
2012–13	not held	
2013–14	not held	
2014–15	Ouémé-Plateau	Atlantique-Littoral
2015–16		
2016–17		
2017–18		
2018–19	JS Vallée	Phénix FC de Bohicon
2019–20	abandoned because of the COVID-19 pandemic in Benin	
2020–21	Espoir FC	Léopards FC d'Abomey
2021–22	Espoir FC	Ainonvi FC
2022–23	Sam Nelly	Espoir FC
2023–24	Ainonvi FC	Elite AS

== Most successful clubs ==
Rank	Club	Champions	Runners-up	Winning seasons	Runners-up seasons
1	Espoir FC	2	1	2021, 2022	2024
2	Flèche Noire SC	1	0	2002	
2	Ainonvi FC	1	1	2024	2022
2	Sam Nelly	1	0	2023	
2	Jeanne d’Arc FC	1	0	2006	
2	Ouémé-Plateau	1	0	2015	
2	JS Vallée	1	0	2019	
8	Black Stones FC	0	1		2002
8	AO Avrankou Babies	0	1		2006
8	Atlantique-Littoral	0	1		2015
8	Phénix FC de Bohicon	0	1		2019
8	Léopards FC d'Abomey	0	1		2021

== Top goalscorers ==
Season	Player	Team	Goals
2024-25	Romaine Gandonou	Tambours	19
2025-26	Romaine Gandonou	Tambours	26
