= FC Inter d'Abidjan =

Ivorian women's football team

- Full name: Football Club Inter d'Abidjan
- League: Ivory Coast Women's Championship

Football Club Inter d'Abidjan is an Ivorian professional women's football club in Abidjan who plays in the Ivory Coast Women's Championship, the top tier of Ivorian women's football.

== History ==
In the 2020–2021 season, Inter finished in second place in the championship behind Africa Sports. Inter won the trophy for the first time in its history in 2023, lifting the national cup after a 2–1 victory over Athlético in the final. Tis happened thanks to a double from Habibou Ouedraogo. In the 2023–2024 season, Inter finally clinched the championship title, qualifying for the Champions League.

== Honours ==
- Ivory Coast Women's Championship
  - Champion : 2024
  - Runner-up: 2021, 2022

== See also ==
- Ivory Coast Women's Championship
- Ivory Coast Women's Cup
- CAF Women's Champions League
