= Niger Women's Championship =

Highest division of league competition for Niger women's football

- Founded: 2018; 8 years ago
- Country: Niger
- Confederation: CAF
- Number of clubs: 9
- Level on pyramid: 1
- International cup: CAF Champions League
- Current champions: AS GNN (3rd title) (2023–24)
- Most championships: AS GNN (3 titles)

The Niger Women's Championship is the highest level of league competition for women's football in Niger. It is the women's equivalent of the men's Niger Super Ligue. Starting with the 2021, the league champion will qualify for the CAF Women's Champions League.

== List of Champions ==
Season	Champion
2019	AS Police
2020	Canceled
2021	AS GNN
2022	AS GNN
2023	AS Police
2024	AS GNN

== Top goalscorers ==
Season	Player	Team	Goals
2025	(Niger) Aichatou Hamed	GNN	16
2026	(Niger) Rahina Moussa	GNN	47
