= AS OTR Lomé (women) =

Togolese women's football team

- Full name: Association Sportive de l'Office Togolais des Recettes
- Founded: 1993; 32 years ago, as Academie Amis du Monde
- president: Nabiyou Hayindiete
- League: Togolese Women's Championship

Association Sportive de l'Office Togolais des Recettes is a Women's association football club from Lomé, Togo. It competes in the Togolese Women's Championship the top tier women's football league in Togo.

== History ==
The club was established in 1993 under the name Academie Amis du Monde. In 2021, AS OTR Lomé represented Togo in the inaugural edition of the CAF Women's Champions League. The club was convincingly defeated (5-1) in the semifinals of the qualifying tournament for the UFOA-B zone by the Rivers Angels, failing to qualify for the continental final phase. However, Amis du Monde secured third place by winning the third-place playoff (2-0) against the USFA.

In the 2021-2022 championship, Amis du Monde emerged victorious in all their matches, including the final against Athlèta (1-0), clinching yet another title.

In 2024 the club changed its name from "Academie Amis du Monde" to its current name "AS OTR Lomé" to be affiliated with AS OTR Lomé.

== Honours ==
Competition	Titles	Winning Seasons	Runners-up
Togolese Women's Championship	3	2000, 2019, 2022	2015

== See also ==
- Togolese Women's Championship
- CAF Women's Champions League
