= Côte d'Ivoire Women's Championship =

- Founded: 1985; 41 years ago
- Country: Ivory Coast
- Confederation: CAF
- Number of clubs: 10
- Relegation to: W-Championship D2
- Domestic cup: Côte d'Ivoire W-Cup
- International cup: CAF W-Champions League
- Current champions: AS D'Abidjan (1st title) (2022-23)
- Most championships: Juventus FC de Yopougon (16 titles)
- Top scorer: Habibou Ouédraogo (132 goals)
- Current: 2025–26 W-Championship

The Côte d'Ivoire Women's Championship is the top flight of women's association football in Ivory Coast. The competition is run by the Ivorian Football Federation.

== History ==
The first Ivorian women's championship was contested in the 1985–86 season. The season 1985/86 had 8 clubs participating while season 1986/87 had 11 participants.

== Champions ==
The list of champions and runners-up:

Year	Champions	Runners-up
1985–86		
1986–87		
1987–88		
1988–89		
1989–90		
1990–91		
1991–92		
1992–93		
1993–94	not held	
1994–95	not held	
1995–96	Juventus FC de Yopougon	
1996–97	Juventus FC de Yopougon	
1998	Juventus FC de Yopougon	
1999	Juventus FC de Yopougon	
2000		
2001	Juventus FC de Yopougon	Omnes de Dabou
2002	Juventus FC de Yopougon	JCA Treichville
2002–03	Juventus FC de Yopougon	Nabab Africaine Sinfra
2004	Juventus FC de Yopougon	Amazones de Koumassi
2005	Juventus FC de Yopougon	Amazones de Koumassi
2006	Juventus FC de Yopougon	
2007	Juventus FC de Yopougon	Amazones de Koumassi
2008	Juventus FC de Yopougon	
2009	Juventus FC de Yopougon	Omnes de Dabou
2010	Juventus FC de Yopougon	Onze Sœurs de Gagnoa
2011	Onze Sœurs de Gagnoa	Omnes de Dabou
2012	Juventus FC de Yopougon	Onze Sœurs de Gagnoa
2013	Omnes de Dabou	Juventus FC de Yopougon
2014	Onze Sœurs de Gagnoa	Juventus FC de Yopougon
2015	abandoned	
2016		
2017	Juventus FC de Yopougon	Africa Sports d'Abidjan
2018	Onze Sœurs de Gagnoa	Juventus FC de Yopougon
2019	Onze Sœurs de Gagnoa	Africa Sports d'Abidjan
2020	cancelled because of the COVID-19 pandemic in Ivory Coast	
2021	Africa Sports d'Abidjan	FC Inter Abidjan
2022	abandoned	
2022-23	Athlético FC d'Abidjan	Juventus FC de Yopougon

== Most successful clubs ==
Rank	Club	Champions	Runners-up	Winning seasons	Runners-up seasons
1	Juventus FC de Yopougon	16	3	1996, 1997, 1998, 1999, 2001, 2002, 2003, 2004, 2005, 2006, 2007, 2008, 2009, 2010, 2012, 2017	2013, 2014, 2018
2	Onze Sœurs de Gagnoa	4	2	2011, 2014, 2018, 2019	2010, 2012
3	Omnes de Dabou	1	3	2013	2001, 2009, 2011
4	Africa Sports d'Abidjan	1	2	2021	2017, 2019
5	Athlético FC d'Abidjan	1	0	2023	

== Top goalscorers ==
Season	Player	Team	Goals
2023-24	(Ivory Coast) Habibou Ouédraogo	ASEC	33
2024-25	(Ivory Coast) Habibou Ouédraogo	ASEC	39
2025-26	(Ivory Coast) Habibou Ouédraogo	ASEC	40

== See also ==
- Côte d'Ivoire Women's Cup
- Côte d'Ivoire Women's Federation Cup
