= Ampem Darkoa Ladies F.C. =

Football team in Ghana

- Full name: Ampem Darkoa Ladies Football Club
- Nickname: NanaMma
- Founded: 2009; 17 years ago
- Ground: Nana Ameyaw Park
- Owner: Nana Opoku Fosu Gyeabour II
- Coach: Joe Nana Adarkwa
- League: Ghana Women’s Premier League
- 2025–26: 1st

Ampem Darkoa Ladies F.C. is a Ghanaian professional women's football club based in Techiman in the Bono East Region of Ghana. The club features in the Ghana Women’s Premier League GWPL).

The club was formed in 2009. It was one of the foundational clubs for the maiden GWPL season in 2012–13. It is currently the 2nd most successful women's club in Ghana after winning the Women's League on 2 different occasions against Hasaacas Ladies who have won it 4 times.

== History ==
In 2009, the club was formed in Techiman, the capital of Techiman Municipal and Bono East Region of Ghana as one of the women's association football clubs in Ghana.

The team competed in their first regional torunament, CAF Women's Champions League WAFU Zone B, in 2022 where they were runners-up to Bayelsa Queens of Nigeria. They went on to win their first regional title in 2023 and qualified for the 2023 CAF Women's Champions League where they finished in fourth.

They won their second regional title in 2026. Edo Queens of Nigeria initially qualified after a 4–1 penalty shootout victory over Ampem Darkoa in the WAFU Zone B Qualifiers final after it ended 2–2 in regulation time. However, following a protest by the Ghanaian side regarding the officials' decision not to play extra time before the shootout, the extra time was subsequently played. Ampem Darkoa won the replay to qualify for the 2026 CAF Women's Champions League.

== Grounds ==
The club plays their home matches at the Nana Ameyaw park in Techiman.

== Honours ==
Type	Competition	Titles	Seasons
Domestic	Ghana Women's Premier League	5	Champions (5): 2015–16, 2017, 2021–22, 2022–23, 2025–26
Domestic	Ghana Women's Super Cup	1	Champions (1): 2017 Runners-up (2): 2022, 2024
Regional	CAF Women's Champions League WAFU Zone B	2	Champions (2): 2023, 2026 Runners-up (1): 2022

== Players ==
=== Current squad ===
As of 2 November 2026

Note: Flags indicate national team as defined under FIFA eligibility rules; some limited exceptions apply. Players may hold more than one non-FIFA nationality.

No.	Pos.	Nation	Player
1	GK	GHA	Rose Teye Baah
2	DF	GHA	Patience Afriyie Berchie
3	DF	GHA	Afishata Mohammed
5	DF	GHA	Rabiatu Maltiti Mohammed
6	MF	GHA	Rebecca Assemani
8	MF	GHA	Victoria Banful (captain)
10	FW	GHA	Nancy Amoh
11	MF	GHA	Asana Hamidu
12	GK	GHA	Aishetu Fatao Awinimi

No.	Pos.	Nation	Player
13	DF	GHA	Patricia Agyei
14	MF	GHA	Priscilla Okyere
15	FW	GHA	Anita Yeboah
16	MF	GHA	Dorothy Pokuaa
17	MF	GHA	Beline Nyarkoh
18	DF	GHA	Gladys Teye Djorkah
19	FW	GHA	Angelina Yeboah
24	DF	GHA	Evelyn Asimo
25	DF	GHA	Victoria Teilar

=== Notable players ===
For details on notable Ampem Darkoa Ladies F.C. footballers see Category:Ampem Darkoa Ladies F.C. players.

== See also ==
- Women's football in Ghana
