= 2021–22 Ghana Women's Premier League =

Ghana Women's Football League season

Ghana Women's Premier League
- Season: 2021–22
- Dates: 17 December 2021 — 28 May 2022
- Champions: Ampem Darkoa Ladies
- Top goalscorer: Princess Owusu (15 goals)
- All statistics correct as of 27 June 2021. Live Matches on StarTimes

The 2021–22 Ghana Women's Premier League (GWPL) is the top division league for women. The league was launched in 2012 and the 2021–22 is set to be its 9th season. Ampem Darkoa Ladies were crowned champions after beating Hasaacas Ladies 5–3 on penalty after 1–1 draw after extra time during the Championship final.

== Season Overview ==
In 2021, the Executive Council of the Ghana Football Association (GFA) decided to expand the League from its current format 16 Clubs to 18 Clubs beginning from this season, meaning nine teams for the respective zones to allow for a minimum of 16 league matches in a season. The league as usual is set to be played in two zones: the Northern Zone and the Southern Zone. Winners of the northern and southern zones then meet in a championship final to declare the champions for the season. The season for 2021–2022 was set to kick off in late 2021.

Faith Ladies FC, Army Ladies FC were promoted from the southern zone Division One League and Savannah ladies and Dreamz Ladies FC were promoted from the northern zone.

== Teams ==
=== Stadiums and locations ===
Note: Table lists in alphabetical order.

Team	Location	Venue
Ampem Darkoa FC	Techiman	
Army Ladies FC	Accra	
Ashtown Ladies	Kumasi	
Berry Ladies (Halifax Ladies)	Accra	
Dreamz Ladies FC	Kumasi	
Faith Ladies FC	Accra	
Hasaacas Ladies	Sekondi-Takoradi	
Immigration Ladies	Accra	
Kumasi Sports Academy	Kumasi	
Lady Strikers	Cape Coast	
Northern Ladies	Tamale	
Pearl Pia Ladies	Tamale	
Police Ladies	Accra	
Prison Ladies	Accra	
Savannah Ladies FC	Tamale	
Soccer Intellectuals	Winneba	
Supreme Ladies	Kumasi	
Thunder Queens FC	Kumasi	

=== Club managers and captains ===
Note: Table lists in alphabetical order.

Team	Manager	Captain
Ampem Darkoa FC	(Ghana) Joe Nana Adarkwa	(Ghana) Justice Tweneboaa
Army Ladies FC	(Ghana) Norbert Ayinbire Elegant	
Ashtown Ladies	(Ghana) Alex Kamara	
Berry Ladies (Halifax Ladies)	(Ghana) Mercy Tagoe Quarcoo	
Dreamz Ladies FC		
Faith Ladies FC	(Ghana) Edna Quagraine	
Hasaacas Ladies	(Ghana) Yusif Basigi	(Ghana) Janet Egyiri
Immigration Ladies	(Ghana) Joseph Badger	
Kumasi Sports Academy	(Ghana) Charles Anokye Frimpong	(Ghana) Naomi Anima
Lady Strikers	(Ghana) Rashid Iddi	(Ghana) Ellen Coleman
Northern Ladies	(Ghana) Sumani Bashirudeen	(Ghana) Jafar Rahama
Pearl Pia Ladies	(Ghana) Baba Nuhu	
Police Ladies	(Ghana) Franklin Oswald Sam	
Prison Ladies	(Ghana) Imoro Amadu	
Soccer Intellectuals Ladies	(Ghana) Ali Yakubu	(Ghana) Mary Essiful
Savannah Ladies FC		
Supreme Ladies	(Ghana) Joyce Boatey-Agyei	(Ghana) Sandra Owusu-Ansah
Thunder Queens FC		

== League table ==
=== Northern Zone ===
Pos	Team	Pld	W	L	D	GF	GA	GD	Pts	
1	Ampem Darkoa Ladies	18	12	3	3	45	10	35	39	NZ Winner & Super Cup 2021
2	Pearl Pia Ladies	18	10	2	6	34	18	16	25	Super Cup 2021
3	Dreamz Ladies	18	10	5	3	29	19	10	23	
4	Prison Ladies	18	9	5	4	29	25	4	16	
5	Ashtown Ladies	18	8	6	4	28	26	2	15	
6	Pearl Pia Ladies	18	7	8	3	24	25	−1	13	
7	Supreme Ladies	18	5	9	4	25	41	−16	19	
8	Fabulous LadiesKumasi Sports Academy Ladies	18	4	8	6	18	30	−12	18	
9	Northern Ladies	18	1	8	9	17	22	-5	12	
10	FC Savannah	18	1	13	4	16	49	-33	7	

Source: Ghana Football Association

=== Southern Zone ===
Pos	Team	Pld	W	L	D	GF	GA	GD	Pts	
1	Hasaacas Ladies	18	14	0	4	36	10	26	46	SZ Winner & Super Cup 2021
2	Faith Ladies	18	9	5	4	32	20	12	31	Super Cup 2021
3	Police Ladies	18	8	4	6	22	16	6	30	
4	Lady Strikers	18	9	8	1	34	24	10	28	
5	Army Ladies	18	8	8	2	21	28	-7	26	
6	Thunder Queens	18	6	5	7	22	22	0	25	
7	Berry Ladies	18	4	4	10	18	20	−2	22	
8	Soccer Intellectuals Ladies	18	4	9	5	15	25	−10	17	
9	Sea Lions	18	2	10	6	9	22	-13	12	
10	Immigration Ladies	18	1	12	5	13	35	-22	8	

Source: Ghana Football Association

=== Championship final ===
28 May 2022
16:00

Ampem Darkoa Ladies	1–1	Hasaacas Ladies
Yeboah 25'		Ameyaa 19'
Penalties
	5−3

Accra Sports Stadium, Accra, Ghana
Referee: Rita Boateng Nkansah

== Statistics ==
=== Top scorers ===
Rank	Player	Club	Goals
1	Princess Owusu	Fabulous Ladies	15
2	(Ghana) Ophelia Serwaa Amponsah	Ampem Darkoa Ladies	12
2	Sarah Nyarko	Dreamz Ladies	12
4	(Ghana) Veronica Appiah	Hasaacas Ladies	10
5	(Ghana) Doris Boaduwaa	Hasaacas Ladies	9
5	(Ghana) Fiduos Yakubu	Ashtown Ladies	9
5	(Ghana) Suzzy Dede Teye	Lady Strikers	9
5	(Ghana) Stella Nyamekye	Dreamz Ladies	9
10	Mary Amponsah	Ampem Darkoa Ladies	8
10	Gladys Amfobea	Lady Strikers	8

== Awards ==
=== Monthly awards ===
The monthly awards were sponsored by NASCO Ghana.

Month	NASCO Player of the Month		NASCO Manager of the Month		References
Month	Player	Club	Manager	Club	References
January	(Ghana) Stella Nyamekye	Dreamz Ladies	(Ghana) Prince Acheampong	Fabulous Ladies	
February / March	(Ghana) Barikusu Abdul Rahman	Pearl Pia Ladies	(Ghana) Yusif Basigi	Hasaacas Ladies	
April	(Ghana) Stella Nyamekye	Dreamz Ladies	(Ghana) Mercy Tagoe-Quarcoo	Berry Ladies	
May	(Ghana) Ophelia Serwaa Amponsah	Ampem Darkoa Ladies	(Ghana) Norbert Ayinbire	Army Ladies	

=== Annual awards ===
The annual awards were given at the end of the season.

Award	Winner	Club
Top scorer of the season	(Ghana) Princess Owusu	Fabulous Ladies
Player of the season	(Ghana) Grace Acheampong	Ampem Darkoa Ladies
Defender of the season	(Ghana) Veronica Darkwah	Ashtown Ladies
Goalkeeper of the season	(Ghana) Safiatu Salifu	Ampem Darkoa Ladies
Discovery of the season	(Ghana) Stella Nyamekye	Dreamz Ladies
Coach of the season	(Ghana) Joe Nana Adarkwah	Ampem Darkoa Ladies

== See also ==
- Women's football in Ghana
- Ghana Women's FA Cup
- 2021–22 Ghana Premier League
