= 2021 Ghana Women's FA Cup =

3rd season of the Ghana Women's FA Cup

Tournament details
- Country: Ghana
- Teams: 32

Final positions
- Champions: Hasaacas Ladies
- Runners-up: Ampem Darkoa Ladies

Tournament statistics
- Matches played: 31
- Top goal scorer: Rahama Jafar (9 goals)

Awards
- Best player: Sonia Opoku (Ampem Darkoa Ladies)

The 2021 Ghana Women's FA Cup was the 3rd edition of the Ghana Women's FA Cup, the knockout women's football competition in Ghana organised by the Ghana Football Association.

This season marks the return of the then-new competition due to the dissolution of the association in the wake of the Anas Aremeyaw Anas' Number 12 exposé and the COVID-19 pandemic in Ghana.

Hasaacas Ladies were crowned champions after beating Ampem Darkoa Ladies 2–0 in the final.

== Sponsorship ==
In June 2021, Electroland Ghana Ltd, distributors of NASCO electronic appliances and sponsors of the Player of the Match award for the Women’s Premier League extended their sponsorship package to the Women’s FA Cup. The players who were adjudged as best players from the round of 16 and quarter-finals of the competition received a NASCO Hand dryer and a sleek NASCO Mobile Phone each. The best players from the semi-finals and the final game were also entitled to products from NASCO.

== Format ==
A total of 32 clubs consisting of 16 Premier League clubs and 16 Women's Division One League clubs from the Regional Football Associations will participate in the 2021 edition competition.

The preliminary round, also known as the round of 32, was contested between the 16 Premier League and 16 Division One clubs across the country. At the round of 32 stage, the clubs were grouped on zonal basis to reduce travelling time, cost and facilitate more local derbies. The preliminary round ran between 14 and 16 May 2021, with the winners advancing to the round of 16.

== Preliminary Round ==
The draw for the preliminary round or round of 32 was made on 10 May 2021. Matches for this round were scheduled for the weekend of 14 May 2021.

The round featured 16 teams from the Women's Premier League and 16 teams from the Women's Division One League.

=== Southern Zone ===
==== Zone 1 ====
14 May 2021	Blessed Ladies (2)	1–5	Berry Ladies (1)
15:00 GMT		Report

14 May 2021	Thunder Queens (2)	4–1	Faith Ladies (2)
15:00 GMT		Report

14 May 2021	Police Ladies (1)	6–1	Ideal Ladies (2)
15:00 GMT		Report

14 May 2021	Army Ladies (2)	0–2	Immigration Ladies (1)
15:00 GMT		Report

14 May 2021	Anlo Ladies (2)	1–2	Valued Ladies (2)
15:00 GMT		Report

==== Zone 2 ====
14 May 2021 Round 32	Basake Royal Ladies (2)	2–6	Essiam Socrates Ladies (2)
15:00 GMT		Report

14 May 2021	Hasaacas Ladies (1)	3–3 (5–4 p)	Lady Strikers (1)
15:00 GMT		Report

14 May 2021	Sea Lions FC (1)	2–1	Soccer Intellectuals Ladies (1)
15:00 GMT		Report

=== Northern Zone ===
==== Zone 1 ====
14 May 2021	Afia Kobi Ampem Ladies (2)	0–7	Ashtown Ladies (1)
15:00 GMT		Report

14 May 2021 Round 32	Fabulous Ladies (1)	0–3	Dreamz Ladies (2)
15:00 GMT		Report

14 May 2021	Supreme Ladies (1)	1–0	Kumasi Sports Academy Ladies (1)
15:00 GMT		Report

==== Zone 2 ====
14 May 2021	Prisons Ladies (1)	16–0	Kintampo Falls Ladies (2)
15:00 GMT		Report

14 May 2021	Candy Soccer Academy (2)	v	Ampem Darkoa Ladies (1)
15:00 GMT		Report

==== Zone 3 ====
14 May 2021	Upland Ladies (2)	0–6	FC Savannah (2)
15:00 GMT		Report

14 May 2021	Zicom Ladies (2)	1–8	Northern Ladies (1)
15:00 GMT		Report

14 May 2021	Pearl Pia Ladies (1)	2–0	Bagabaga Ladies (2)
15:00 GMT		Report

== Round of 16 ==
The draw for this round was held on 18 April 2021. Matches for this round were scheduled for the weekend of 22–23 May 2021.

This round featured 14 teams from the Women's Premier League and two teams from the Women's Division One League.

=== Southern Zone ===
22 May 2021	Berry Ladies (1)	2–0	Sea Lions FC (1)	Madina, Ghana
15:00 GMT		Report		Stadium: Madina Astro Turf

22 May 2021 Round 16	Immigration Ladies (1)	3–1	Valued Girls (2)	Accra, Ghana
15:00 GMT		Report		Stadium: Mcdan La Town Park

23 May 2021	Police Ladies (1)	1–1 (3–5 p)	Hasaacas Ladies (1)	Accra, Ghana
15:00 GMT		Report		Stadium: Mcdan La Town Park

23 May 2021	Essiam Socrates Ladies (2)	0–2	Thunder Queens (1)	Sekondi-Takoradi, Ghana
15:00 GMT		Report		Stadium: Aduyaw Asasan Park

=== Northern Zone ===
21 May 2021	Northern Ladies (1)	5–0	FC Savannah (1)	Tamale, Ghana
15:00 GMT		Report		Stadium: Aliu Mahama Sports Stadium

22 May 2021	Ashtown Ladies (1)	1–2	Supreme Ladies (1)	Kumasi, Ghana
15:00 GMT		Report		Stadium: Wesley College Park

23 May 2021 Round 16	Ampem Darkoa Ladies (1)	2–1	Dreamz Ladies (2)	Techiman, Ghana
15:00 GMT		Report		Stadium: Ohene Ameyaw Park

24 May 2021 Round 16	Prison Ladies (1)	3–2	Pearl Pia Ladies (1)	Sunyani, Ghana
15:00 GMT		Report		Stadium: Sunyani Coronation Park

== Quarter-finals ==
The draw for this round was held on 4 June 2021 in the studio of StarTimes Adepa channel 247 and Max TV. The balloting was done having teams in the Northern and Southern zone put together in one pot. There were no restrictions for teams in both the Northern and Southern zones to play against each other. The matches were played from 11 to 14 June 2021.

11 June 2021	Prison Ladies (1)	1–2	Supreme Ladies (1)	Sunyani, Ghana
15:00 GMT				Stadium: Sunyani Coronation Park

12 June 2021	Thunder Queens (1)	v	Berry Ladies (1)	Tema, Ghana
15:00 GMT				Stadium: Tema Comma 8 School Park

13 June 2021	Hasaacas Ladies (1)	2–0	Northern Ladies (1)	Sekondi-Takoradi, Ghana
15:00 GMT				Stadium: Gyandu Park

14 June 2021	Ampem Darkoa Ladies (1)	2–0	Immigration Ladies (1)	Techiman, Ghana
15:00 GMT				Stadium: Ohene Ameyaw Park

== Semi-finals ==
The draw for the semi-finals was held on 21 March 2021, in the studio of StarTimes Adepa channel 247 and Max TV. The ties were played on the weekend of 19–20 June 2021.

21 June 2021
11:00 GMT

Ampem Darkoa Ladies (1)	1–0 (a.e.t.)	Thunder Queens (1)
Sonia Opoku 92'	Report

Ohene Ameyaw Park, Techiman, Ghana
21 June 2021
15:00 GMT

Supreme Ladies (1)	2–1	Hasaacas Ladies (1)
Linda Owusu Ansah 9'	Report	Milot Abena Pokua 61'; Doris Boaduwaa 82'

Gyandu Park, Sekondi-Takoradi, Ghana

== Final ==
4 July 2021
15:00 GMT

Ampem Darkoa Ladies	0–2	Hasaacas Ladies
	Report	Milot Abena Pokua 44'; Doris Boaduwaa 25'

Accra Sports Stadium, Ghana
Referee: Mansa Hommey

=== Annual awards ===
The annual awards were given at the end final match

Award	Winner	Club	Ref.
Top scorer of the season	(Ghana) Rahama Jafar (9 goals)	Northern Ladies	
Player of the season	(Ghana) Sonia Opoku	Ampem Darkoa Ladies	
Defender of the season	(Ghana) Comfort Yeboah	Hasaacas Ladies	
Goalkeeper of the season	(Ghana) Evelyn Yeboah	Ampem Darkoa Ladies	
Coach of the season	(Ghana) Yusif Basigi	Hasaacas Ladies	

== See also ==
- 2020–21 Ghana Women's Premier League
- 2021 Ghana FA Cup
