= 2024 FIFA U-20 Women's World Cup squads =

The following is a list of squads for each national team that competed at the 2024 FIFA U-20 Women's World Cup. The tournament took place in Colombia, from 31 August to 22 September 2024. It was the 11th biennial international world youth football championship organised by FIFA for the women's under-20 national teams.

Players born between 1 January 2004 and 31 December 2008 were eligible to compete in the tournament. Each team had to register a squad of 21 players, minimum three of whom had to be goalkeepers (regulation article 27.1). The final squads were confirmed by FIFA on 26 August 2024. The full squad listings are below.

The age listed for each player is their age as of 31 August 2024, the first day of the tournament. The numbers of caps and goals listed for each player do not include any matches played after the start of the tournament. The club listed is the club for which the player last played a competitive match prior to the tournament. The nationality for each club reflects the national association (not the league) to which the club is affiliated. A flag is included for coaches who are of a different nationality to their team.

== Group A ==
=== Australia ===
The final squad was announced on 9 August 2024. The following week, Emilia Murray withdrew due to an injury and was replaced by Avaani Prakash.

Head coach: Leah Blayney

No.	Pos.	Player	Date of birth (age)	Caps	Goals	Club
1	GK	Chloe Lincoln	4 January 2005 (aged 19)	16	0	(Football Australia) Western United
2	DF	Ella Buchanan	31 March 2004 (aged 20)	2	0	(Football Australia) Western Sydney Wanderers
3	DF	Naomi Chinnama	13 May 2004 (aged 20)	19	1	(Football Australia) Perth Glory
4	FW	Lara Gooch	2 November 2005 (aged 18)	5	1	(Football Australia) Newcastle Jets
5	DF	Jessika Nash (captain)	5 October 2004 (aged 19)	17	1	(Football Australia) Melbourne Victory
6	MF	Zara Kruger	29 May 2006 (aged 18)	12	1	(Football Australia) Brisbane Roar
7	MF	Jynaya Dos Santos	22 September 2005 (aged 18)	10	4	(Football Australia) Blacktown Spartans
8	DF	Sasha Grove	30 December 2004 (aged 19)	14	2	(Football Australia) Western United
9	FW	Ella O'Grady	31 December 2006 (aged 17)	6	3	(Football Australia) Melbourne Victory
10	MF	Indiana Dos Santos	10 October 2007 (aged 16)	10	0	(Football Australia) Sydney FC
11	FW	Kahli Johnson	18 February 2004 (aged 20)	19	6	(Football Australia) Western United
12	GK	Tahlia Franco	29 June 2006 (aged 18)	2	0	(Football Australia) Sydney FC
13	FW	Peta Trimis	18 May 2006 (aged 18)	10	3	(Football Australia) Central Coast Mariners
14	MF	Alicia Woods	18 January 2004 (aged 20)	2	1	(Football Australia) Peninsula Power
15	DF	Alexia Apostolakis	16 May 2006 (aged 18)	16	1	(Football Australia) Melbourne City
16	MF	Avaani Prakash	13 December 2006 (aged 17)	4	1	(Football Australia) Western United
17	MF	Madeleine Caspers	15 March 2007 (aged 17)	4	0	(Football Australia) Sydney FC
18	GK	Grace Wilson	4 March 2005 (aged 19)	2	0	(United States Soccer Federation) Maine Black Bears
19	MF	Shay Hollman	19 September 2005 (aged 18)	11	2	(Football Australia) Sydney FC
20	FW	Tanaye Morris	11 March 2004 (aged 20)	2	1	(Football Australia) Adelaide University
21	FW	Amber Luchtmeijer	26 February 2007 (aged 17)	0	0	(Football Australia) Sydney FC

=== Cameroon ===
A 30-player preliminary squad was announced on 7 August 2024. A 24-player preliminary squad was announced on 15 August 2024. The squad was cut down to 21 players ahead of the beginning of the tournament.

Head coach: Hassan Balla Abdoussalami

No.	Pos.	Player	Date of birth (age)	Caps	Goals	Club
1	GK	Cathy Biya	18 July 2006 (aged 18)			(Cameroonian Football Federation) Éclair
2	DF	Estelle Yanga Zeh	29 August 2005 (aged 19)			(Cameroonian Football Federation) Ebolowa
3	DF	Marlene Essimi	29 November 2005 (aged 18)			(Cameroonian Football Federation) Amazone Fap
4	MF	Mariane Maague	11 June 2004 (aged 20)			(Cameroonian Football Federation) Amazone Fap
5	DF	Orline Djutchie Segning	26 July 2005 (aged 19)			(Cameroonian Football Federation) Lekié
6	MF	Achta Toko	8 July 2005 (aged 19)			(Royal Spanish Football Federation) CD Getafe
7	FW	Mana Lamine	15 June 2005 (aged 19)			(French Football Federation) Le Mans
8	FW	Kiki Meva	5 January 2008 (aged 16)			(Cameroonian Football Federation) Authentic LFC Douala
9	MF	Victoire Divawissa	13 January 2006 (aged 18)			(Cameroonian Football Federation) Cyclone
10	MF	Naomi Eto (captain)	23 September 2004 (aged 19)			(Cameroonian Football Federation) Amazone Fap
11	MF	Nicole Ndjock Pouhe	12 November 2005 (aged 18)			(Cameroonian Football Federation) Lekié
12	DF	Bernadette Ngaseh Mbele	16 November 2005 (aged 18)			(French Football Federation) Fleury
13	FW	Suzie Mbiandji	14 May 2005 (aged 19)			(Cameroonian Football Federation) Authentic LFC Douala
14	MF	Monique Ngock	17 September 2004 (aged 19)			(French Football Federation) Reims
15	FW	Annie Enganemben	1 April 2004 (aged 20)			(Cameroonian Football Federation) Ebolowa
16	GK	Chelsea Ngole	14 June 2007 (aged 17)			(Cameroonian Football Federation) Authentic LFC Douala
17	FW	Camilla Daha	18 March 2005 (aged 19)			(Royal Spanish Football Federation) CD Getafe
18	FW	Nina Ngueleu	11 December 2004 (aged 19)			(French Football Federation) Montpellier
19	DF	Victoire Ngono	15 December 2004 (aged 19)			(Royal Spanish Football Federation) CD Getafe
20	FW	Andree Ngo Bilong	29 October 2007 (aged 16)			(Cameroonian Football Federation) Authentic LFC Douala
21	GK	Calixte Chantal Ngah	1 March 2006 (aged 18)			(Cameroonian Football Federation) Amazone Fap

=== Colombia ===
A 23-player preliminary squad was announced on 16 August 2024. The following week, the final squad was announced. On 27 August, Daniela Garavito withdrew due to injury and was replaced by Jylis Corena.

Head coach: Carlos Paniagua

No.	Pos.	Player	Date of birth (age)	Caps	Goals	Club
1	GK	Luisa Agudelo	27 March 2007 (aged 17)			(Colombian Football Federation) Deportivo Cali
2	DF	Mary Álvarez	22 August 2005 (aged 19)			(Colombian Football Federation) Atlético Nacional
3	DF	Cristina Motta	15 September 2005 (aged 18)			(Colombian Football Federation) Santa Fe
4	DF	Yunaira López	4 December 2004 (aged 19)			(Colombian Football Federation) Atlético Nacional
5	DF	Ledys Calvo	19 October 2004 (aged 19)			(Colombian Football Federation) Millonarios
6	DF	Katerine Osorio	20 November 2004 (aged 19)			(Colombian Football Federation) Atlético Nacional
7	DF	Jylis Corena	28 September 2005 (aged 18)			(Colombian Football Federation) Atlético Nacional
8	MF	Natalia Hernández	19 January 2005 (aged 19)			(Colombian Football Federation) Deportivo Cali
9	FW	Yésica Muñoz	27 April 2005 (aged 19)			(Colombian Football Federation) Llaneros
10	MF	Gabriela Rodríguez	10 May 2005 (aged 19)	23	8	(Colombian Football Federation) América de Cali
11	FW	Maithé López	24 January 2007 (aged 17)			(Colombian Football Federation) Real Santander
12	GK	Jimena Ospina Domínguez	26 October 2006 (aged 17)			(Colombian Football Federation) Deportivo Cali
13	DF	Greicy Landázury	1 August 2004 (aged 20)			(Colombian Football Federation) Independiente Medellín
14	DF	Fernanda Viáfara	22 July 2006 (aged 18)			(Colombian Football Federation) Alianza
15	MF	Karla Torres	11 October 2006 (aged 17)			(Colombian Football Federation) Santa Fe
16	MF	Juana Ortegón	6 August 2006 (aged 18)			(Colombian Football Federation) Deportivo Cali
17	FW	Ana Mile González	18 June 2005 (aged 19)			(Colombian Football Federation) Millonarios
18	FW	Linda Caicedo (captain)	22 February 2005 (aged 19)	4	2	(Royal Spanish Football Federation) Real Madrid
19	FW	Sintia Cabezas	1 May 2006 (aged 18)			(Colombian Football Federation) América de Cali
20	MF	Karla Viancha	8 November 2005 (aged 18)			(Colombian Football Federation) Santa Fe
21	GK	Valeria Candanoza	29 April 2004 (aged 20)			(Colombian Football Federation) Independiente Medellín

=== Mexico ===
The final squad was announced on 11 August 2024. On 24 August, Ivonne González withdrew due to injury and was replaced by Tatiana Flores.

Head coach: Ana Galindo

No.	Pos.	Player	Date of birth (age)	Caps	Goals	Club
1	GK	Renatta Cota	12 May 2005 (aged 19)			(Mexican Football Federation) León
2	DF	Michel Fong	2 June 2006 (aged 18)			(Mexican Football Federation) Tijuana
3	DF	Ana Mendoza	7 August 2005 (aged 19)			(Mexican Football Federation) Pumas UNAM
4	DF	Natalia Colin	17 May 2005 (aged 19)			(Mexican Football Federation) Tigres UANL
5	DF	Giselle Espinoza	8 March 2005 (aged 19)			(Mexican Football Federation) Juárez
6	MF	Alejandra Lomelí	30 June 2004 (aged 20)			(Mexican Football Federation) Atlas
7	FW	Maribel Flores	8 January 2005 (aged 19)			(United States Soccer Federation) USC Trojans
8	MF	Fátima Servín (captain)	17 May 2005 (aged 19)			(Mexican Football Federation) Monterrey
9	FW	Paola García	29 March 2004 (aged 20)			(Mexican Football Federation) Atlas
10	MF	Alice Soto	26 March 2006 (aged 18)			(Mexican Football Federation) Pachuca
11	MF	Valerie Vargas	25 May 2005 (aged 19)			(United States Soccer Federation) UCLA Bruins
12	GK	Valeria Martínez	23 September 2005 (aged 18)			(Mexican Football Federation) Necaxa
13	DF	Nicol de León	21 July 2007 (aged 17)			(Mexican Football Federation) Santos Laguna
14	DF	Isabela Esquivias	14 February 2004 (aged 20)			(Mexican Football Federation) León
15	MF	Silvana González	24 October 2006 (aged 17)			(Mexican Football Federation) Atlético San Luis
16	MF	Julia Valadez	6 April 2006 (aged 18)			(Mexican Football Federation) Pachuca
17	FW	Tatiana Flores	15 September 2005 (aged 18)			(Mexican Football Federation) Tigres UANL
18	FW	América Frías	19 January 2004 (aged 20)			(United States Soccer Federation) UCLA Bruins
19	MF	Montserrat Saldívar	20 September 2006 (aged 17)			(Mexican Football Federation) América
20	FW	Hailey Gordon	21 January 2006 (aged 18)			(United States Soccer Federation) Slammers FC HB Køge
21	GK	Mariángela Medina	9 May 2006 (aged 18)			(United States Soccer Federation) UCLA Bruins

== Group B ==
=== Brazil ===
The final squad was announced on 12 August 2024. On 29 August, Ana Flávia withdrew due to injury and was replaced by Fernanda.

Head coach: Rosana

No.	Pos.	Player	Date of birth (age)	Caps	Goals	Club
1	GK	Rillary	10 July 2005 (aged 19)			(Brazilian Football Confederation) Corinthians
2	DF	Gi Fernandes	23 December 2004 (aged 19)			(Brazilian Football Confederation) Corinthians
3	DF	Guta	5 May 2005 (aged 19)			(United States Soccer Federation) UCF Knights
4	DF	Carla	12 May 2004 (aged 20)			(Brazilian Football Confederation) Internacional
5	DF	Rebeca	1 September 2005 (aged 18)			(Brazilian Football Confederation) Cruzeiro
6	DF	Ana Guimarães	11 February 2004 (aged 20)			(Brazilian Football Confederation) Botafogo
7	FW	Vendito	25 March 2005 (aged 19)			(Brazilian Football Confederation) Ferroviária
8	MF	Maiara	11 August 2004 (aged 20)			(Portuguese Football Federation) Sporting
9	FW	Priscila	22 August 2004 (aged 20)	4	1	(Brazilian Football Confederation) Internacional
10	MF	Vitória Amaral (captain)	11 November 2004 (aged 19)			(Brazilian Football Confederation) São Paulo
11	FW	Dudinha	4 July 2005 (aged 19)			(Brazilian Football Confederation) São Paulo
12	GK	Nanda Mayrink	15 September 2005 (aged 18)			(United States Soccer Federation) Barry Buccaneers
13	DF	Ravena	30 January 2004 (aged 20)			(Brazilian Football Confederation) São Paulo
14	DF	Duda Mineira	4 December 2004 (aged 19)			(Brazilian Football Confederation) Corinthians
15	MF	Marzia	7 June 2004 (aged 20)			(Brazilian Football Confederation) Internacional
16	FW	Milena	7 April 2004 (aged 20)			(Brazilian Football Confederation) São Paulo
17	MF	Lara	1 September 2005 (aged 18)			(United States Soccer Federation) Florida State Seminoles
18	FW	Fernanda	19 January 2005 (aged 19)			(Brazilian Football Confederation) Ferroviária
19	FW	Gisele	20 May 2007 (aged 17)			(Brazilian Football Confederation) Grêmio
20	MF	Carol	1 June 2005 (aged 19)			(Brazilian Football Confederation) Fluminense
21	GK	Mari	7 July 2005 (aged 19)			(Brazilian Football Confederation) Internacional

=== Canada ===
The final squad was announced on 19 August 2024.

Head coach: Cindy Tye

No.	Pos.	Player	Date of birth (age)	Caps	Goals	Club
1	GK	Faith Fenwick	4 February 2005 (aged 19)			(United States Soccer Federation) Gonzaga Bulldogs
2	DF	Mya Archibald	31 March 2005 (aged 19)			(United States Soccer Federation) Illinois Fighting Illini
3	DF	Ella Ottey	12 August 2005 (aged 19)			(United States Soccer Federation) Wisconsin Badgers
4	DF	Zoe Markesini	7 October 2005 (aged 18)			(United States Soccer Federation) Princeton Tigers
5	DF	Clare Logan	24 August 2005 (aged 19)			(United States Soccer Federation) Notre Dame Fighting Irish
6	MF	Jeneva Hernandez Gray	5 October 2006 (aged 17)			(Canadian Soccer Association) Vancouver Whitecaps
7	FW	Amanda Allen	21 February 2005 (aged 19)	6	4	(United States Soccer Federation) Orlando Pride
8	MF	Florianne Jourde (captain)	5 November 2004 (aged 19)			(United States Soccer Federation) USC Trojans
9	FW	Nyah Rose	4 April 2005 (aged 19)			(United States Soccer Federation) SMU Mustangs
10	FW	Olivia Smith	5 August 2004 (aged 20)	18	20	(The Football Association) Liverpool
11	FW	Annabelle Chukwu	8 February 2007 (aged 17)	9	9	(United States Soccer Federation) Notre Dame Fighting Irish
12	MF	Sadie Waite	21 October 2004 (aged 19)			(United States Soccer Federation) Nebraska Cornhuskers
13	DF	Renee Watson	28 May 2005 (aged 19)			(United States Soccer Federation) Michigan State Spartans
14	FW	Jaime Perrault	8 August 2006 (aged 18)			(Canadian Soccer Association) Vancouver Whitecaps
15	DF	Jadea Collin	29 January 2006 (aged 18)			(United States Soccer Federation) Wisconsin Badgers
16	FW	Ella McBride	16 April 2004 (aged 20)			(United States Soccer Federation) Providence Friars
17	DF	Janet Okeke	1 March 2006 (aged 18)			(United States Soccer Federation) NC State Wolfpack
18	MF	Kayla Briggs	5 July 2005 (aged 19)			(United States Soccer Federation) Providence Friars
19	MF	Anaya Johnson	2 August 2005 (aged 19)			(United States Soccer Federation) UConn Huskies
20	GK	Noelle Henning	4 February 2007 (aged 17)			(Canadian Soccer Association) NDC-CDN Ontario
21	GK	Sofia Cortes-Browne	15 August 2006 (aged 18)			(United States Soccer Federation) Arizona Wildcats

=== Fiji ===
A 25-player preliminary squad was announced on 20 May 2024. The final squad was announced on 27 August 2024.

Head coach: (Singapore) Angeline Chua

No.	Pos.	Player	Date of birth (age)	Caps	Goals	Club
1	GK	Meresani Waqali	21 April 2004 (aged 20)			(Fiji Football Association) Ba FC
2	DF	Ema Mereaia	29 October 2006 (aged 17)			(Fiji Football Association) Labasa FC
3	MF	Adi Bakaniceva (captain)	9 March 2004 (aged 20)			(Fiji Football Association) Rewa FC
4	DF	Seruwaia Laulaba	27 December 2007 (aged 16)			(Fiji Football Association) Tailevu Naitasiri FC
5	DF	Caroline Qalivere	8 March 2007 (aged 17)			(Fiji Football Association) Lautoka FC
6	DF	Talei Moodie	10 February 2004 (aged 20)			(United States Soccer Federation) Cal State Fullerton Titans
7	FW	Kasanita Tabua	28 May 2007 (aged 17)			(Fiji Football Association) Tailevu Naitasiri FC
8	MF	Preeya Singh	19 August 2004 (aged 20)			(United States Soccer Federation) Manteca FC
9	FW	Narieta Leba	18 August 2004 (aged 20)			(Fiji Football Association) Labasa FC
10	FW	Elesi Tabunase	12 August 2008 (aged 16)			(Fiji Football Association) Ba FC
11	DF	Sereana Naweni	3 October 2006 (aged 17)			(Fiji Football Association) Ba FC
12	MF	Pijila Kilawaca	27 December 2005 (aged 18)			(Fiji Football Association) Navua FC
13	FW	Sonia Alfred	22 January 2004 (aged 20)			(Fiji Football Association) Labasa FC
14	DF	Adi Naiveli	28 November 2005 (aged 18)			(Fiji Football Association) Nadi FC
15	DF	Asela Cokanasiga	22 May 2005 (aged 19)			(Fiji Football Association) Ba FC
16	MF	Evivi Buka	27 July 2004 (aged 20)			(Fiji Football Association) Ba FC
17	FW	Asenaca Naio	19 June 2008 (aged 16)			(Fiji Football Association) Ba FC
18	MF	Katarina Nailele	21 November 2005 (aged 18)			(Fiji Football Association) Tailevu Naitasiri FC
19	DF	Angeline Rekha	29 September 2004 (aged 19)			(Fiji Football Association) Ba FC
20	GK	Aliana Vakaloloma	13 October 2008 (aged 15)			(United States Soccer Federation) Spokane Shadow
21	GK	Emily Esposito	20 January 2007 (aged 17)			(Fiji Football Association) Nasinu FC

=== France ===
The final squad was announced on 2 August 2024.

Head coach: Sandrine Ringler

No.	Pos.	Player	Date of birth (age)	Caps	Goals	Club
1	GK	Féerine Belhadj	14 February 2005 (aged 19)			(French Football Federation) Lyon
2	DF	Marion Haelewyn	30 October 2004 (aged 19)			(French Football Federation) Reims
3	FW	Léa Bourgain	26 January 2004 (aged 20)			(French Football Federation) Reims
4	DF	Romane Lejeune	9 October 2004 (aged 19)			(French Football Federation) Lens
5	FW	Océane Hurtré	17 February 2004 (aged 20)			(French Football Federation) Paris Saint-Germain
6	MF	Maëlle Seguin	18 July 2004 (aged 20)			(French Football Federation) Guingamp
7	FW	Pauline Haugou	29 September 2004 (aged 19)			(French Football Federation) Lille
8	MF	Chloé Neller (captain)	13 May 2004 (aged 20)			(French Football Federation) Strasbourg
9	FW	Madeleine Yetna	9 April 2004 (aged 20)			(French Football Federation) Le Mans
10	MF	Juliette Mossard	9 July 2005 (aged 19)			(French Football Federation) Nantes
11	MF	Airine Fontaine	20 August 2004 (aged 20)			(French Football Federation) Fleury
12	DF	Pauline Sierra	13 March 2004 (aged 20)			(French Football Federation) Toulouse
13	DF	Léa Notel	3 October 2004 (aged 19)			(French Football Federation) Reims
14	DF	Hillary Diaz	24 July 2004 (aged 20)			(French Football Federation) Bordeaux
15	MF	Maeline Mendy	26 December 2006 (aged 17)			(French Football Federation) Lyon
16	GK	Emma Francart	31 January 2004 (aged 20)			(French Football Federation) Fleury
17	FW	Shana Chossenotte	14 February 2005 (aged 19)			(French Football Federation) Reims
18	MF	Mélinda Mendy	21 December 2006 (aged 17)			(French Football Federation) Le Havre
19	FW	Dona Scannapiéco	6 June 2004 (aged 20)			(French Football Federation) Marseille
20	FW	Liana Joseph	15 August 2006 (aged 18)			(French Football Federation) Lyon
21	GK	Jade Dumas	30 December 2004 (aged 19)			(French Football Federation) Le Mans

== Group C ==
=== Morocco ===
The final squad was announced on 21 August 2024.

Head coach: (Spain) Jorge Vilda

No.	Pos.	Player	Date of birth (age)	Caps	Goals	Club
1	GK	Inès Souifi	17 August 2004 (aged 20)			(French Football Federation) Colomiers
2	DF	Fatima Zahra Naini	20 September 2006 (aged 17)			(Royal Moroccan Football Federation) Hilal Témara
3	FW	Djennah Cherif	10 January 2006 (aged 18)			(French Football Federation) Thonon Evian
4	DF	Ikram Neddar	11 April 2004 (aged 20)			(Italian Football Federation) Frosinone
5	DF	Fatima El Ghazouani	11 May 2005 (aged 19)			(French Football Federation) Lens
6	DF	Dania Boussatta	16 February 2005 (aged 19)			Unattached
7	FW	Doha El Madani	20 October 2005 (aged 18)			(Royal Moroccan Football Federation) AS FAR
8	MF	Samya Masnaoui	16 September 2005 (aged 18)			Unattached
9	FW	Yasmine Zouhir (captain)	16 July 2005 (aged 19)	7	4	(Royal Spanish Football Federation) Real Betis
10	MF	Dounia Ftouh	23 August 2004 (aged 20)			(Royal Moroccan Football Federation) AS FAR
11	MF	Sofia Boussate	20 April 2006 (aged 18)			(French Football Federation) Montpellier
12	GK	Fatima Zahra El Jebraoui	8 August 2007 (aged 17)			(Royal Moroccan Football Federation) Wydad AC
13	DF	Siham Bouhouch	22 October 2007 (aged 16)			(French Football Federation) Strasbourg
14	DF	Maissen Bourhrine	16 October 2004 (aged 19)			(French Football Federation) Lyon
15	MF	Lina Laetitia Farida Aich	27 January 2006 (aged 18)			(French Football Federation) Reims
16	GK	Anissa Rouinba	23 December 2004 (aged 19)			(German Football Association) 1. FC Köln
17	MF	Kawtar Ait Omar	19 February 2004 (aged 20)			(Royal Belgian Football Association) Genk
18	FW	Romaissa Boukakar	24 December 2005 (aged 18)			(Royal Dutch Football Association) AZ
19	FW	Kautar Azraf	3 January 2008 (aged 16)			(Royal Spanish Football Federation) Barcelona
20	DF	Hajar Jbilou	30 August 2004 (aged 20)			(Royal Moroccan Football Federation) AS FAR
21	DF	Hajar Said	22 May 2005 (aged 19)			(French Football Federation) Bordeaux

=== Paraguay ===
The final squad was announced on 19 August 2024.

Head coach: (Brazil) Fábio Fukumoto

No.	Pos.	Player	Date of birth (age)	Caps	Goals	Club
1	GK	Araceli Leguizamón	6 August 2005 (aged 19)			(Brazilian Football Confederation) Grêmio
2	DF	Milagros Rolón	19 August 2004 (aged 20)			(Brazilian Football Confederation) AD Taubaté
3	DF	Sofía Almirón	20 January 2004 (aged 20)			(Football Federation of Chile) Everton
4	MF	Naomi de León	6 May 2005 (aged 19)			(Paraguayan Football Association) Libertad
5	MF	Danna Garcete	21 May 2005 (aged 19)			(Paraguayan Football Association) Olimpia
6	DF	Gabriela Valdez	25 January 2004 (aged 20)			(Argentine Football Association) Banfield
7	MF	Fiorella Fernández	31 August 2006 (aged 18)			(Paraguayan Football Association) Libertad
8	FW	Adriana Martínez (captain)	9 April 2005 (aged 19)			(Brazilian Football Confederation) Grêmio
9	FW	Lujan Tamay	23 April 2004 (aged 20)			(Paraguayan Football Association) Olimpia
10	FW	Fátima Acosta	7 January 2005 (aged 19)			(Brazilian Football Confederation) São Paulo
11	MF	Agustina Varela	21 May 2005 (aged 19)			(Paraguayan Football Association) Olimpia
12	GK	Luana Rodríguez	26 November 2004 (aged 19)			(Paraguayan Football Association) Guaraní
13	GK	Kamila Benítez	24 January 2008 (aged 16)			(Paraguayan Football Association) Sol de América
14	DF	Vanessa Arnaboldi	14 February 2005 (aged 19)			(Brazilian Football Confederation) Internacional
15	MF	Belén Talavera	22 May 2005 (aged 19)			(Paraguayan Football Association) Libertad
16	DF	Nayeli Torres	2 August 2006 (aged 18)			(Paraguayan Football Association) Cerro Porteño
17	FW	Jorgelina González	23 April 2004 (aged 20)			(Paraguayan Football Association) Nacional
18	FW	Claudia Martínez	15 January 2008 (aged 16)			(Paraguayan Football Association) Olimpia
19	FW	Zunilda Coronel	2 August 2004 (aged 20)			(Paraguayan Football Association) Libertad
20	FW	Pamela Villalba	2 February 2006 (aged 18)			(Paraguayan Football Association) Olimpia
21	DF	Luz Cardozo	19 July 2006 (aged 18)			(Paraguayan Football Association) Olimpia

=== Spain ===
The final squad was announced on 16 August 2024.

Head coach: Sonia Bermúdez

No.	Pos.	Player	Date of birth (age)	Caps	Goals	Club
1	GK	Sofía Fuente	14 March 2005 (aged 19)	3	0	(Royal Spanish Football Federation) Real Madrid
2	DF	Judit Pujols	25 February 2005 (aged 19)	3	0	(Royal Spanish Football Federation) Barcelona
3	DF	Estela Carbonell	18 October 2004 (aged 19)	1	0	(Royal Spanish Football Federation) Levante
4	MF	Nahia Aparicio	24 October 2004 (aged 19)	2	0	(Royal Spanish Football Federation) Real Sociedad
5	DF	Sandra Villafañe	18 September 2005 (aged 18)	3	0	(Royal Spanish Football Federation) Madrid CFF
6	MF	Maite Zubieta	28 May 2004 (aged 20)	10	0	(Royal Spanish Football Federation) Athletic Club
7	FW	Ornella Vignola	30 September 2004 (aged 19)	8	0	(Royal Spanish Football Federation) Granada
8	DF	Silvia Lloris (captain)	15 May 2004 (aged 20)	10	0	(Royal Spanish Football Federation) Atlético Madrid
9	FW	Jone Amezaga	2 January 2005 (aged 19)	3	1	(Royal Spanish Football Federation) Athletic Club
10	MF	Júlia Bartel	18 May 2004 (aged 20)	9	0	(The Football Association) Chelsea
11	FW	Ona Baradad	31 August 2004 (aged 20)	2	0	(Royal Spanish Football Federation) Barcelona
12	DF	Aïcha Cámara	11 December 2006 (aged 17)	1	0	(Royal Spanish Football Federation) Barcelona
13	GK	Andrea Tarazona	21 March 2004 (aged 20)	2	0	(Royal Spanish Football Federation) Levante
14	MF	Marina Artero	24 October 2005 (aged 18)	1	0	(Royal Spanish Football Federation) Deportivo La Coruña
15	DF	Sara Ortega	20 February 2005 (aged 19)	3	0	(Royal Spanish Football Federation) Athletic Club
16	MF	Olaya Enrique	10 May 2005 (aged 19)	3	1	(Royal Spanish Football Federation) Deportivo La Coruña
17	FW	Lucía Corrales	24 November 2005 (aged 18)	3	0	(Royal Spanish Football Federation) Sevilla
18	FW	Lucía Moral	11 February 2004 (aged 20)	2	1	(Royal Spanish Football Federation) Sevilla
19	FW	Laia Martret	28 August 2005 (aged 19)	2	1	(Royal Spanish Football Federation) Barcelona
20	MF	Érika González	31 August 2004 (aged 20)	3	0	(Royal Spanish Football Federation) Levante
21	GK	Eunate Astralaga	30 November 2005 (aged 18)	0	0	(Royal Spanish Football Federation) Athletic Club

=== United States ===
The final squad was announced on 8 August 2024. On 15 August, Sam Courtwright withdrew from the squad due to an anterior cruciate ligament injury and was replaced by Addison Halpern.

Head coach: (England) Tracey Kevins

No.	Pos.	Player	Date of birth (age)	Caps	Goals	Club
1	GK	Teagan Wy	30 July 2004 (aged 20)	8	0	(United States Soccer Federation) California Golden Bears
2	DF	Gisele Thompson	2 December 2005 (aged 18)	7	1	(United States Soccer Federation) Angel City
3	DF	Savannah King	7 February 2005 (aged 19)	12	0	(United States Soccer Federation) Bay FC
4	DF	Jordyn Bugg	11 August 2006 (aged 18)	12	0	(United States Soccer Federation) Seattle Reign
5	DF	Elise Evans	16 December 2004 (aged 19)	12	0	(United States Soccer Federation) Stanford Cardinal
6	MF	Claire Hutton	11 January 2006 (aged 18)	5	0	(United States Soccer Federation) Kansas City Current
7	FW	Giana Riley	13 April 2004 (aged 20)	8	1	(United States Soccer Federation) Florida State Seminoles
8	FW	Jordynn Dudley	21 November 2004 (aged 19)	9	3	(United States Soccer Federation) Florida State Seminoles
9	FW	Ally Sentnor (captain)	18 February 2004 (aged 20)	16	9	(United States Soccer Federation) Utah Royals
10	MF	Ally Lemos	4 March 2004 (aged 20)	13	1	(United States Soccer Federation) Orlando Pride
11	FW	Emeri Adames	3 April 2006 (aged 18)	6	1	(United States Soccer Federation) Seattle Reign
12	GK	Mackenzie Gress	3 June 2004 (aged 20)	5	0	(United States Soccer Federation) Penn State Nittany Lions
13	DF	Leah Klenke	21 June 2004 (aged 20)	11	0	(United States Soccer Federation) Notre Dame Fighting Irish
14	MF	Taylor Suarez	27 May 2005 (aged 19)	8	1	(United States Soccer Federation) Florida State Seminoles
15	DF	Heather Gilchrist	4 March 2004 (aged 20)	6	0	(United States Soccer Federation) Florida State Seminoles
16	MF	Riley Jackson	2 December 2005 (aged 18)	8	1	(United States Soccer Federation) North Carolina Courage
17	FW	Maddie Dahlien	25 July 2004 (aged 20)	8	4	(United States Soccer Federation) North Carolina Tar Heels
18	MF	Yuna McCormack	3 November 2004 (aged 19)	0	0	(United States Soccer Federation) Virginia Cavaliers
19	FW	Pietra Tordin	30 March 2004 (aged 20)	7	2	(United States Soccer Federation) Princeton Tigers
20	MF	Addison Halpern	5 December 2006 (aged 17)	0	0	(United States Soccer Federation) Players Development Academy
21	GK	Caroline Birkel	25 August 2006 (aged 18)	0	0	(United States Soccer Federation) St. Louis Scott Gallagher

== Group D ==
=== Germany ===
The final squad was announced on 13 August 2024. The following week, Paula Hoppe withdrew from the squad and was replaced by Kiara Beck.

Head coach: Kathrin Peter

No.	Pos.	Player	Date of birth (age)	Caps	Goals	Club
1	GK	Rebecca Adamczyk	3 April 2005 (aged 19)	4	0	(German Football Association) SC Freiburg
2	DF	Miriam Hils	11 March 2004 (aged 20)	10	0	(United States Soccer Federation) California Golden Bears
3	MF	Mathilde Janzen	14 February 2005 (aged 19)	5	0	(Swedish Football Association) Kristianstads DFF
4	DF	Jella Veit	3 May 2005 (aged 19)	6	1	(German Football Association) Eintracht Frankfurt
5	DF	Vanessa Diehm (captain)	22 March 2004 (aged 20)	11	0	(German Football Association) TSG Hoffenheim
6	DF	Sara Ritter	25 July 2005 (aged 19)	6	0	(German Football Association) TSG Hoffenheim
7	FW	Cora Zicai	29 November 2004 (aged 19)	12	2	(German Football Association) SC Freiburg
8	MF	Sofie Zdebel	8 August 2004 (aged 20)	7	0	(German Football Association) Bayer Leverkusen
9	FW	Marie Steiner	4 September 2005 (aged 18)	6	1	(German Football Association) TSG Hoffenheim
10	MF	Sophie Nachtigall	12 February 2004 (aged 20)	7	1	(German Football Association) Eintracht Frankfurt
11	FW	Lisa Baum	25 November 2006 (aged 17)	6	1	(German Football Association) Hamburger SV
12	GK	Kiara Beck	1 June 2004 (aged 20)	1	0	(German Football Association) VfB Stuttgart
13	MF	Nia Szenk	5 May 2004 (aged 20)	5	0	(German Football Association) SC Freiburg
14	DF	Alina Axtmann	25 June 2005 (aged 19)	3	0	(German Football Association) SC Freiburg
15	DF	Tomke Schneider	31 July 2004 (aged 20)	4	0	(German Football Association) Eintracht Frankfurt
16	MF	Paulina Platner	16 November 2005 (aged 18)	7	2	(German Football Association) SGS Essen
17	MF	Alara Şehitler	27 November 2006 (aged 17)	7	1	(German Football Association) Bayern Munich
18	MF	Sarah Ernst	31 July 2004 (aged 20)	4	0	(German Football Association) Bayern Munich
19	MF	Loreen Bender	21 August 2005 (aged 19)	3	0	(German Football Association) Bayer Leverkusen
20	FW	Laura Gloning	5 June 2005 (aged 19)	2	0	(German Football Association) Bayern Munich
21	GK	Lina von Schrader	8 February 2004 (aged 20)	4	0	(German Football Association) RB Leipzig

=== Nigeria ===
A preliminary squad was announced on 5 July 2024. The final squad was announced on 21 August 2024.

Head coach: Christopher Danjuma

No.	Pos.	Player	Date of birth (age)	Caps	Goals	Club
1	GK	Shukura Bakare	14 August 2005 (aged 19)			(Nigeria Football Federation) Nasarawa Amazons
2	FW	Chiamaka Okwuchukwu	7 August 2005 (aged 19)			(Nigeria Football Federation) Rivers Angels
3	FW	Goodness Osigwe	26 April 2007 (aged 17)			(Nigeria Football Federation) Edo Queens
4	FW	Mary Nkpa	22 December 2007 (aged 16)			(Nigeria Football Federation) Heartland Queens
5	MF	Shakirat Oyinlola	8 January 2006 (aged 18)			(Royal Spanish Football Federation) La Liga Academy
6	DF	Rofiat Imuran	17 June 2004 (aged 20)			Unattached
7	FW	Flourish Sabastine	20 October 2004 (aged 19)			(French Football Federation) Reims
8	FW	Amina Bello	18 December 2005 (aged 18)			(United States Soccer Federation) Otero Rattlers
9	FW	Janet Akekoromowei	6 November 2007 (aged 16)			(Nigeria Football Federation) Asisat Oshoala Academy
10	MF	Adoo Yina	30 December 2004 (aged 19)			(Nigeria Football Federation) Nasarawa Amazons
11	MF	Olushola Shobowale	20 November 2004 (aged 19)			(Nigeria Football Federation) Nasarawa Amazons
12	DF	Oluchi Ohaegbulem (captain)	18 October 2006 (aged 17)			(Nigeria Football Federation) Nasarawa Amazons
13	DF	Oluwabunmi Oladeji	9 August 2004 (aged 20)			(Nigeria Football Federation) Naija Ratels
14	FW	Opeyemi Ajakaye	30 December 2005 (aged 18)			(Royal Spanish Football Federation) Madrid CFF
15	MF	Chioma Olise	16 March 2005 (aged 19)			(Nigeria Football Federation) Edo Queens
16	GK	Anderline Mgbechi	30 November 2005 (aged 18)			(Nigeria Football Federation) Delta Queens
17	DF	Jumoke Alani	17 July 2005 (aged 19)			(Nigeria Football Federation) Nasarawa Amazons
18	DF	Shukurat Oladipo	22 September 2004 (aged 19)			(Nigeria Football Federation) Robo
19	DF	Comfort Folorunsho	26 January 2006 (aged 18)			(Nigeria Football Federation) Edo Queens
20	MF	Joy Igbokwe	6 March 2006 (aged 18)			(Nigeria Football Federation) Naija Ratels
21	GK	Faith Omilana	1 December 2005 (aged 18)			(Nigeria Football Federation) Naija Ratels

=== South Korea ===
The final squad was announced on 12 August 2024.

Head coach: Park Youn-jeong

No.	Pos.	Player	Date of birth (age)	Caps	Goals	Club
1	GK	Woo Seo-bin	13 April 2004 (aged 20)			(Korea Football Association) Uiduk University
2	DF	Jung You-jin	10 October 2005 (aged 18)			(Korea Football Association) Uiduk University
3	DF	Yang Da-min	18 September 2005 (aged 18)			(Korea Football Association) Ulsan College
4	DF	Eom Min-kyoung	24 November 2004 (aged 19)			(Korea Football Association) Uiduk University
5	DF	Nam Seung-eun	10 January 2006 (aged 18)			(Korea Football Association) Osan Information High School
6	MF	Kim Shin-ji	3 May 2004 (aged 20)			(Korea Football Association) Uiduk University
7	FW	Jeon Yu-gyeong (captain)	20 January 2004 (aged 20)			(Korea Football Association) Uiduk University
8	MF	Kim Ji-hyeon	27 July 2004 (aged 20)			(Korea Football Association) Daedeok University
9	FW	Park Soo-jeong	3 November 2004 (aged 19)			(Korea Football Association) Ulsan College
10	MF	Bae Ye-bin	7 December 2004 (aged 19)			(Korea Football Association) Uiduk University
11	FW	Cho Hye-young	18 February 2006 (aged 18)			(Korea Football Association) Gwangyang Girls' High School
12	GK	Cho Eo-jin	20 March 2005 (aged 19)			(Korea Football Association) Ulsan College
13	MF	Choi Han-bin	2 March 2004 (aged 20)			(Korea Football Association) Korea University
14	FW	Cheon Se-hwa	11 November 2004 (aged 19)			(Korea Football Association) Ulsan College
15	DF	Choi Eun-hyoung	25 May 2005 (aged 19)			(Korea Football Association) Korea University
16	DF	Kim Kyu-yeon	23 June 2005 (aged 19)			(Korea Football Association) Ulsan College
17	MF	Hong Chae-bin	11 February 2004 (aged 20)			(Korea Football Association) Korea University
18	MF	Kang Eun-young	5 December 2004 (aged 19)			(Korea Football Association) Daedeok University
19	FW	Jeong Da-bin	5 September 2005 (aged 18)			(Korea Football Association) Korea University
20	DF	Chang Seo-yoon	30 October 2004 (aged 19)			(United States Soccer Federation) Yale Bulldogs
21	GK	Jeong Da-hee	13 November 2006 (aged 17)			(Korea Football Association) Chungnam Internet High School

=== Venezuela ===
A 23-player preliminary squad was announced on 8 July 2024. A 26-player preliminary squad was announced on 6 August 2024. The final squad was announced on 22 August 2024.

Head coach: (Italy) Pamela Conti

No.	Pos.	Player	Date of birth (age)	Caps	Goals	Club
1	GK	Hilary Azuaje	27 October 2004 (aged 19)			(Venezuelan Football Federation) Deportivo La Guaira
2	DF	Gabriela Angulo (captain)	27 February 2004 (aged 20)			(United States Soccer Federation) Purdue Boilermakers
3	DF	Nazly Sánchez	16 May 2005 (aged 19)			(Colombian Football Federation) Cúcuta Deportivo
4	DF	Sabrina Araujo-Elorza	11 May 2004 (aged 20)			(United States Soccer Federation) Northeastern Huskies
5	DF	María León	22 January 2007 (aged 17)			(Venezuelan Football Federation) Academia Puerto Cabello
6	DF	Cristina Rivas	7 September 2005 (aged 18)			(Venezuelan Football Federation) ADIFFEM
7	MF	Floriangel Apóstol	7 September 2005 (aged 18)			(Royal Spanish Football Federation) Deportivo La Coruña
8	MF	Andrea Cova	1 October 2006 (aged 17)			(Venezuelan Football Federation) Deportivo La Guaira
9	FW	Mariana Barreto	12 March 2004 (aged 20)			(United States Soccer Federation) Central Methodist Eagles
10	MF	Marianyela Jiménez	16 April 2004 (aged 20)			(United States Soccer Federation) Florida State Seminoles
11	FW	Génesis Hernández	19 June 2006 (aged 18)			(United States Soccer Federation) Florida United
12	GK	Tibayre Rodríguez	9 August 2004 (aged 20)			(Israel Football Association) Bnot Netanya
13	MF	Karelis Alvarado	3 September 2005 (aged 18)			(Colombian Football Federation) Cúcuta Deportivo
14	MF	Gabriela González	17 May 2005 (aged 19)			(United States Soccer Federation) Georgia State Panthers
15	MF	Claudia Pérez	10 July 2008 (aged 16)			(Venezuelan Football Federation) Deportivo Miranda
16	FW	Rebecca Vega	15 June 2005 (aged 19)			(United States Soccer Federation) Southern Miss Golden Eagles
17	MF	Fabiana Vásquez	20 July 2005 (aged 19)			(Venezuelan Football Federation) Nueva Esparta
18	MF	Melanie Chirinos	20 March 2008 (aged 16)			(Venezuelan Football Federation) ADIFFEM
19	FW	Francelis Graterol	29 March 2006 (aged 18)			(Venezuelan Football Federation) Academia Puerto Cabello
20	MF	Amanda Gugliotta	26 September 2008 (aged 15)			(United States Soccer Federation) Miami Rush Kendall
21	GK	Yusnireth Rodríguez	21 December 2006 (aged 17)			(Venezuelan Football Federation) Estudiantes de Mérida

== Group E ==
=== Austria ===
A 23-player preliminary squad was announced on 6 August 2024. The final squad was announced on 29 August 2024.

Head coach: Markus Hackl

No.	Pos.	Player	Date of birth (age)	Caps	Goals	Club
1	GK	Mariella El Sherif	2 September 2004 (aged 19)			(German Football Association) Carl Zeiss Jena
2	GK	Christina Schönwetter	21 April 2005 (aged 19)			(Austrian Football Association) First Vienna
3	DF	Sarah Gutmann	17 July 2006 (aged 18)			(Austrian Football Association) First Vienna
4	DF	Isabell Schneiderbauer	28 April 2004 (aged 20)			(Austrian Football Association) First Vienna
5	DF	Jovana Čavić	17 June 2004 (aged 20)			(Austrian Football Association) First Vienna
6	MF	Anna Holl	22 March 2004 (aged 20)			(Austrian Football Association) Neulengbach
7	MF	Valentina Mädl	18 December 2005 (aged 18)			(Austrian Football Association) St. Pölten
8	MF	Emilia Purtscher	26 July 2005 (aged 19)			(Austrian Football Association) Rheindorf Altach
9	DF	Tatjana Weiss	12 January 2004 (aged 20)			(Austrian Football Association) Neulengbach
10	MF	Nicole Ojukwu	28 November 2005 (aged 18)			(German Football Association) SC Freiburg
11	MF	Magdalena Rukavina	19 January 2005 (aged 19)			(Austrian Football Association) First Vienna
12	MF	Greta Spinn	27 March 2007 (aged 17)			(Austrian Football Association) Bergheim
13	FW	Alisa Ziletkina	6 November 2006 (aged 17)			(Austrian Football Association) Austria Wien
14	DF	Chiara D'Angelo (captain)	31 July 2004 (aged 20)			(Austrian Football Association) St. Pölten
15	MF	Julia Keutz	18 March 2004 (aged 20)			(Austrian Football Association) Sturm Graz
16	DF	Nadine Seidl	3 May 2004 (aged 20)			(Austrian Football Association) First Vienna
17	DF	Laura Spinn	7 February 2005 (aged 19)			(Austrian Football Association) Bergheim
18	FW	Hannah Fankhauser	10 September 2006 (aged 17)			(Austrian Football Association) First Vienna
19	FW	Almedina Šišić	2 February 2006 (aged 18)			(Austrian Football Association) Blau-Weiß Linz/Union Kleinmünchen
20	MF	Anna Wirnsberger	8 December 2004 (aged 19)			(Austrian Football Association) Sturm Graz
21	GK	Larissa Rusek	1 January 2005 (aged 19)			(Austrian Football Association) Neulengbach

=== Ghana ===
The final squad was announced on 19 August 2024.

Head coach: Yusif Basigi

No.	Pos.	Player	Date of birth (age)	Caps	Goals	Club
1	GK	Afi Amenyeku	15 November 2005 (aged 18)			(Ghana Football Association) Northern Ladies
2	DF	Sarah Kulible	20 April 2004 (aged 20)			(Ghana Football Association) Army Ladies
3	DF	Alexandra Emefa Tay	1 January 2007 (aged 17)			(United States Soccer Federation) Seattle United
4	DF	Abiba Issah	1 January 2004 (aged 20)			(Ghana Football Association) Hasaacas Ladies
5	FW	Jennifer Owusuwaa	1 June 2004 (aged 20)			(Ghana Football Association) Ampem Darkoa Ladies
6	MF	Veronica Kumah	6 August 2006 (aged 18)			(Ghana Football Association) Hasaacas Ladies
7	FW	Mary Amponsah	16 April 2006 (aged 18)			(Ghana Football Association) Ampem Darkoa Ladies
8	MF	Wasiima Mohammed	22 March 2004 (aged 20)			(Ghana Football Association) Northern Ladies
9	FW	Salamatu Abdulai	27 November 2004 (aged 19)			(Ghana Football Association) Ampem Darkoa Ladies
10	MF	Stella Nyamekye (captain)	18 September 2005 (aged 18)			(Ghana Football Association) Dreamz Ladies
11	FW	Jennifer Dawah	10 April 2007 (aged 17)			(Ghana Football Association) Epiphany Warriors
12	MF	Asana Alhassan	25 August 2006 (aged 18)			(Ghana Football Association) Tamale Super Ladies
13	DF	Comfort Yeboah	17 December 2006 (aged 17)			(Ghana Football Association) Ampem Darkoa Ladies
14	FW	Mercy Attobrah	1 May 2007 (aged 17)			(Ghana Football Association) Hasaacas Ladies
15	MF	Beline Nyarkoh	1 May 2005 (aged 19)			(Ghana Football Association) Mfantseman Royal Ladies
16	GK	Jenna Kayla Sapong	11 January 2006 (aged 18)			(United States Soccer Federation) Auburn Tigers
17	FW	Tracey Twum	16 January 2004 (aged 20)			(Ghana Football Association) Ampem Darkoa Ladies
18	FW	Mafia Nyame	7 October 2004 (aged 19)			(Royal Moroccan Football Federation) AS FAR
19	MF	Helen Alormenu	21 September 2005 (aged 18)			(United States Soccer Federation) Texas State Bobcats
20	GK	Najat Salam	10 March 2006 (aged 18)			(Ghana Football Association) Tamale Super Ladies
21	DF	Hannah Nyame	12 December 2005 (aged 18)			(Ghana Football Association) Socrates Ladies

=== Japan ===
The final squad was announced on 14 August 2024. Mao Kubota withdrew from the squad due to injury and was replaced by Asaki Wada.

Head coach: Michihisa Kano

No.	Pos.	Player	Date of birth (age)	Caps	Goals	Club
1	GK	Akane Okuma	15 September 2004 (aged 19)			(Japan Football Association) INAC Kobe Leonessa
2	DF	Nana Kashimura	15 April 2004 (aged 20)			(Japan Football Association) NTV Tokyo Verdy Beleza
3	DF	Raika Okamura	30 July 2005 (aged 19)			(Japan Football Association) Urawa Red Diamonds
4	DF	Hiromi Yoneda	2 October 2004 (aged 19)			(Japan Football Association) Cerezo Osaka Yanmar
5	MF	Manaka Hayashi (captain)	16 August 2004 (aged 20)			(United States Soccer Federation) Santa Clara Broncos
6	DF	Rio Sasaki	17 September 2004 (aged 19)			(Japan Football Association) Mynavi Sendai
7	MF	Fuka Tsunoda	24 October 2004 (aged 19)			(Japan Football Association) Urawa Red Diamonds
8	MF	Aemu Oyama	19 September 2004 (aged 19)			(Japan Football Association) Waseda University
9	FW	Chinari Sasai	12 October 2004 (aged 19)			(Japan Football Association) Nojima Stella Kanagawa Sagamihara
10	FW	Manaka Matsukubo	28 July 2004 (aged 20)			(United States Soccer Federation) North Carolina Courage
11	MF	Rihona Ujihara	8 July 2004 (aged 20)			(Japan Football Association) NTV Tokyo Verdy Beleza
12	FW	Asaki Wada	30 May 2004 (aged 20)			(Japan Football Association) INAC Kobe Leonessa
13	FW	Maya Hijikata	19 August 2004 (aged 20)			(Japan Football Association) NTV Tokyo Verdy Beleza
14	DF	Shinomi Koyama	31 January 2005 (aged 19)			(Swedish Football Association) Djurgården
15	MF	Miku Hayama	14 May 2005 (aged 19)			(Japan Football Association) Sanfrecce Hiroshima Regina
16	MF	Suzu Amano	18 February 2004 (aged 20)			(Swedish Football Association) Hammarby
17	DF	Uno Shiragaki	11 October 2005 (aged 18)			(Japan Football Association) Cerezo Osaka Yanmar
18	GK	Uruha Iwasaki	13 March 2006 (aged 18)			(Japan Football Association) Nojima Stella Kanagawa Sagamihara
19	MF	Miyu Matsunaga	8 June 2006 (aged 18)			(Japan Football Association) NTV Tokyo Verdy Beleza
20	MF	Mao Itamura	6 August 2006 (aged 18)			(Japan Football Association) JFA Academy Fukushima
21	GK	Jessica Yuri Wulf	20 May 2005 (aged 19)			(Japan Football Association) NTV Tokyo Verdy Beleza

=== New Zealand ===
The final squad was announced on 20 August 2024.

Head coach: Leon Birnie

No.	Pos.	Player	Date of birth (age)	Caps	Goals	Club
1	GK	Aimee Danieli	11 February 2005 (aged 19)			(New Zealand Football) Wellington Phoenix
2	DF	Zoe McMeeken	11 March 2004 (aged 20)			(New Zealand Football) Wellington Phoenix
3	FW	Ella McMillan	20 March 2005 (aged 19)			(New Zealand Football) Wellington Phoenix
4	MF	Ella Findlay	3 February 2004 (aged 20)			(New Zealand Football) Western Springs
5	DF	Suya Haering	3 July 2005 (aged 19)			(German Football Association) Turbine Potsdam
6	MF	Emma Pijnenburg	13 September 2004 (aged 19)			(Royal Dutch Football Association) Feyenoord
7	MF	Kiara Bercelli	23 February 2005 (aged 19)			(Italian Football Federation) Sampdoria
8	MF	Helena Errington	31 July 2005 (aged 19)			Unattached
9	FW	Milly Clegg	1 November 2005 (aged 18)			(United States Soccer Federation) Racing Louisville
10	FW	Ruby Nathan	11 October 2005 (aged 18)			(Football Australia) Canberra United
11	MF	Manaia Elliott (captain)	21 April 2005 (aged 19)			(New Zealand Football) Wellington Phoenix
12	DF	Ella McCann	25 March 2005 (aged 19)			(New Zealand Football) Wellington Phoenix
13	MF	Lara Colpi	5 May 2005 (aged 19)			(Swiss Football Association) Young Boys
14	MF	Daisy Brazendale	12 March 2006 (aged 18)			(New Zealand Football) Wellington Phoenix
15	DF	Marie Green	12 January 2005 (aged 19)			(New Zealand Football) Wellington Phoenix
16	DF	Rebekah Trewhitt	13 December 2005 (aged 18)			(New Zealand Football) Wellington Phoenix
17	MF	Olivia Ingham	9 November 2005 (aged 18)			(New Zealand Football) Wellington Phoenix
18	GK	Maddie Iro	24 October 2005 (aged 18)			(United States Soccer Federation) High Point Panthers
19	MF	Zoe Benson	14 August 2006 (aged 18)			(New Zealand Football) Eastern Suburbs
20	MF	Olivia Page	2 February 2005 (aged 19)			(The Football Association) Sheffield United
21	GK	Amber Bennett	28 September 2004 (aged 19)			(New Zealand Football) Cashmere Technical

== Group F ==
=== Argentina ===
The final squad was announced on 22 August 2024.

Head coach: Christian Meloni

No.	Pos.	Player	Date of birth (age)	Caps	Goals	Club
1	GK	Paulina Aprile	13 May 2008 (aged 16)			(Argentine Football Association) Rosario Central
2	DF	Camila Duarte	3 October 2005 (aged 18)			(Argentine Football Association) River Plate
3	DF	Milagros Martin	26 April 2007 (aged 17)			(Argentine Football Association) Platense
4	DF	Juana Cangaro	13 February 2006 (aged 18)			(Argentine Football Association) River Plate
5	MF	Samantha Weiss	24 February 2005 (aged 19)			(United States Soccer Federation) Columbia Lions
6	DF	Anela Nigito	22 June 2004 (aged 20)			(United States Soccer Federation) Cal State Bakersfield Roadrunners
7	FW	Delfina Lombardi	17 March 2006 (aged 18)			(United States Soccer Federation) Keiser Seahawks
8	MF	Sofía Domínguez (captain)	16 December 2005 (aged 18)			(Argentine Football Association) River Plate
9	FW	Kishi Núñez	17 May 2006 (aged 18)			(Argentine Football Association) Boca Juniors
10	FW	Francisca Altgelt	11 May 2006 (aged 18)			(Argentine Football Association) River Plate
11	FW	Verónica Acuña	12 February 2004 (aged 20)			(Argentine Football Association) Banfield
12	GK	Martina Krotter	2 June 2005 (aged 19)			(Argentine Football Association) River Plate
13	DF	Luciana Pérez	22 January 2005 (aged 19)			(Argentine Football Association) Racing
14	DF	Serena Rodríguez	26 December 2005 (aged 18)			(Argentine Football Association) Racing
15	MF	Valentina Tesio	6 February 2006 (aged 18)			(Argentine Football Association) Ferro
16	DF	Julieta Romero	8 June 2004 (aged 20)			(Argentine Football Association) River Plate
17	MF	Denise Rojo	15 March 2006 (aged 18)			(Royal Spanish Football Federation) Rayo Vallecano
18	MF	Margarita Giménez	1 November 2004 (aged 19)			(Argentine Football Association) Ferro
19	MF	Juana Fonseca	16 May 2004 (aged 20)			(Argentine Football Association) San Lorenzo
20	MF	Julieta Martínez	3 October 2007 (aged 16)			(Argentine Football Association) Boca Juniors
21	GK	Priscila Siben	3 April 2007 (aged 17)			(Argentine Football Association) Boca Juniors

=== Costa Rica ===
The final squad was announced on 22 August 2024. Two days later, Tanisha Fonseca withdrew from the squad due to injury and was replaced by María Luisa González.

Head coach: Patricia Aguilar Córdoba

No.	Pos.	Player	Date of birth (age)	Caps	Goals	Club
1	GK	Génesis Pérez (captain)	4 May 2005 (aged 19)	5	0	(United States Soccer Federation) UCF Knights
2	DF	Marian Solano	19 May 2006 (aged 18)			(Costa Rican Football Federation) Alajuelense
3	DF	Joselyn Briceño	24 September 2006 (aged 17)			(Costa Rican Football Federation) Sporting
4	DF	Jimena Rodríguez	3 August 2005 (aged 19)			(Costa Rican Football Federation) Sporting
5	DF	Saray Benavides	24 December 2004 (aged 19)			(Costa Rican Football Federation) Alajuelense
6	DF	Jimena González	31 December 2005 (aged 18)			(Costa Rican Football Federation) Sporting
7	MF	Alexa Herrera	16 November 2004 (aged 19)			(Costa Rican Football Federation) Alajuelense
8	MF	Priscilla Rodríguez	26 May 2005 (aged 19)			(Costa Rican Football Federation) Saprissa
9	FW	María Luisa González	28 December 2005 (aged 18)			(Costa Rican Football Federation) Sporting
10	FW	Sheika Scott	22 October 2006 (aged 17)			(Costa Rican Football Federation) Alajuelense
11	FW	Pamela Elizondo	11 January 2005 (aged 19)			(Costa Rican Football Federation) Dimas Escazú
12	MF	Alisha Lindo	28 September 2008 (aged 15)			(Costa Rican Football Federation) Saprissa
13	GK	Isabella Arvide	26 January 2007 (aged 17)			(Costa Rican Football Federation) Sporting
14	DF	María Paula Arce	9 March 2004 (aged 20)			(Costa Rican Football Federation) Alajuelense
15	MF	Jimena Jiménez	27 July 2006 (aged 18)			(Costa Rican Football Federation) Sporting
16	MF	Monserrat Díaz	11 November 2004 (aged 19)			(Costa Rican Football Federation) Sporting
17	MF	Mónica Matarrita	7 November 2005 (aged 18)			(Costa Rican Football Federation) Saprissa
18	GK	Marely Fonseca	5 March 2005 (aged 19)			(United States Soccer Federation) John Brown Golden Eagles
19	FW	Sianyf Agüero	27 January 2004 (aged 20)			(Costa Rican Football Federation) Alajuelense
20	MF	Daniela Ocampo	16 July 2008 (aged 16)			(Costa Rican Football Federation) Alajuelense
21	DF	Keishlyn Mena	12 October 2005 (aged 18)			(Costa Rican Football Federation) Dimas Escazú

=== Netherlands ===
A 23-player preliminary squad was announced on 22 July 2024. The final squad was announced on 16 August 2024.

Head coach: Roos Kwakkenbos

No.	Pos.	Player	Date of birth (age)	Caps	Goals	Club
1	GK	Femke Liefting (captain)	2 January 2006 (aged 18)			(Royal Dutch Football Association) AZ
2	DF	Louise van Oosten	2 July 2004 (aged 20)			(Royal Dutch Football Association) ADO Den Haag
3	DF	Djoeke de Ridder	21 August 2005 (aged 19)			(Royal Dutch Football Association) AZ
4	DF	Veerle Buurman	21 April 2006 (aged 18)			(Royal Dutch Football Association) PSV
5	DF	Emma Frijns	25 February 2005 (aged 19)			(Royal Dutch Football Association) PSV
6	MF	Kealyn Thomas	27 July 2005 (aged 19)			(Royal Dutch Football Association) AZ
7	FW	Zoë Zuidberg	29 March 2007 (aged 17)			(Royal Dutch Football Association) PEC Zwolle
8	MF	Ilse Kemper	20 June 2006 (aged 18)			(Royal Dutch Football Association) PEC Zwolle
9	FW	Bo van Egmond	13 November 2006 (aged 17)			(Royal Dutch Football Association) PEC Zwolle
10	MF	Robine Lacroix	2 June 2005 (aged 19)			(Royal Dutch Football Association) PSV
11	MF	Iris Remmers	1 November 2004 (aged 19)			(Royal Dutch Football Association) ADO Den Haag
12	DF	Inske Weiman	23 August 2006 (aged 18)			(Royal Dutch Football Association) PEC Zwolle
13	DF	Eef Smits	5 February 2004 (aged 20)			(Royal Dutch Football Association) Heerenveen
14	DF	Noëlle van der Sluijs	7 September 2005 (aged 18)			(Royal Dutch Football Association) Feyenoord
15	MF	Jet van Beijeren	30 October 2004 (aged 19)			(Royal Dutch Football Association) Heerenveen
16	GK	Trinette Booms	25 October 2006 (aged 17)			(Royal Dutch Football Association) AZ
17	FW	Fleur Stoit	9 January 2004 (aged 20)			(Royal Dutch Football Association) PSV
18	MF	Nayomi Buikema	5 May 2004 (aged 20)			(Royal Dutch Football Association) PEC Zwolle
19	FW	Eva Oude Elberink	13 April 2006 (aged 18)			(Royal Dutch Football Association) Twente
20	FW	Fieke Kroese	7 February 2005 (aged 19)			(Royal Dutch Football Association) AZ
21	GK	Febe Copier	10 July 2006 (aged 18)			(Royal Dutch Football Association) Utrecht

=== North Korea ===
Head coach: Ri Song-ho

No.	Pos.	Player	Date of birth (age)	Caps	Goals	Club
1	GK	Hyon Son-gyong	23 January 2004 (aged 20)	1	0	(DPR Korea Football Association) April 25
2	DF	Ri Su-yang	15 April 2004 (aged 20)	2	0	(DPR Korea Football Association) April 25
3	DF	Han Hong-ryon	10 January 2004 (aged 20)	4	0	(DPR Korea Football Association) Wolmido
4	FW	Sin Hyang	9 July 2005 (aged 19)	0	0	(DPR Korea Football Association) Wolmido
5	DF	Oh Sol-song	30 June 2004 (aged 20)	5	0	(DPR Korea Football Association) Sobaeksu
6	DF	Kim Kang-mi	1 November 2004 (aged 19)	5	0	(DPR Korea Football Association) Amnokgang
7	FW	Jong Kum	1 June 2004 (aged 20)	5	1	(DPR Korea Football Association) Naegohyang
8	MF	Choe Song-gyong	18 February 2004 (aged 20)	0	0	(DPR Korea Football Association) April 25
9	MF	Kim Song-gyong	12 February 2005 (aged 19)	5	1	(DPR Korea Football Association) Amnokgang
10	FW	Pak Mi-ryong	27 January 2004 (aged 20)	5	2	(DPR Korea Football Association) Naegohyang
11	MF	Ham Ju-hyang	25 April 2004 (aged 20)	3	0	(DPR Korea Football Association) April 25
12	MF	Choe Kang-ryon	2 January 2004 (aged 20)	4	0	(DPR Korea Football Association) April 25
13	MF	Jon Ryong-jong	25 July 2004 (aged 20)	5	2	(DPR Korea Football Association) April 25
14	FW	Hwang Yu-yong	13 April 2006 (aged 18)	5	1	(DPR Korea Football Association) Amnokgang
15	FW	Choe Il-son	1 January 2007 (aged 17)	5	1	(DPR Korea Football Association) April 25
16	DF	Pak Hyo-son	5 April 2004 (aged 20)	1	0	(DPR Korea Football Association) Naegohyang
17	MF	Kim Song-ok	11 December 2004 (aged 19)	5	0	(DPR Korea Football Association) Naegohyang
18	GK	Pak Su-mi	10 March 2004 (aged 20)	0	0	(DPR Korea Football Association) Sobaeksu
19	MF	Min Kyong-jin	23 January 2005 (aged 19)	1	1	(DPR Korea Football Association) Naegohyang
20	MF	Chae Un-yong (captain)	12 April 2004 (aged 20)	5	2	(DPR Korea Football Association) Wolmido
21	GK	Chae Un-gyong	29 November 2004 (aged 19)	4	0	(DPR Korea Football Association) Pyongyang City
