= Fredrica Torkudzor =

Ghanaian footballer (born 2004)

Personal information
- Date of birth: 31 July 2004 (age 22)
- Position: Forward

Team information
- Current team: Ünye Gücü
- Number: 6

Senior career*
Years	Team	Apps	(Gls)
2021–2022	Northern Ladies	17	(8)
2022–2023	Pearl Pia Ladies		
2023–2024	HOPS		
2024–	Ünye Gücü	1	(1)

International career
- Ghana
- * Club domestic league appearances and goals as of 8 September 2024

Fredrica Torkudzor (born 31 July 2004) is a Ghanaian professional women's football forward who plays in the Turkish Super League for Ünye Gücü.

== Club career ==
Torkudzor played in her country in the Ghana Women's Premier League for the Tamale-based clubs Northern Ladies F.C. (2021–22), and Pearl Pia Ladies F.C. (2022–23).

She played in the Indian Women's League for the Delhi-based club House of Power Soccer FC.

End August 2024, she moved to Turkey, and signed with the newly to the Super League promoted club Ünye Gücü F.K. in Ordu.

In the 2023–2024 season, Torkudzor joined HOPS FC in the Indian Women's League (IWL). She was a key player for the team, scoring 7 goals during the season, including a hat-trick in a 5–1 away victory against Kickstart FC on January 29, 2024.
