= 2025 Gotham FC season =

Gotham FC's sixteenth season

Gotham FC
2025 season
- Operating owners: Carolyn Tisch Blodgett (lead); Ed Nalbandian
- General manager: Yael Averbuch West
- Head coach: Juan Carlos Amorós
- Stadium: Sports Illustrated Stadium; Harrison, New Jersey; (Capacity: 25,000)
- NWSL: 8th
- CONCACAF W Champions Cup: Winners
- Playoffs: Champions
Home colors	Away colors
- All statistics correct as of January 8, 2025.

The 2025 Gotham FC season was the team's 16th as a professional women's soccer team and their 12th participating in the National Women's Soccer League (NWSL), the top tier of women's soccer in the United States. Finishing 8th in the regular season, they entered the playoffs as the lowest-ranked contender. They went on to win their second NWSL championship in three years.

In continental play, they won the 2024–25 CONCACAF W Champions Cup. In the 2025–26 competition, they qualified for the knockout phase by finishing second in their group. By winning the 2025 NWSL championship, they qualified for the 2026–27 edition.

== Background ==
In 2024, Gotham FC finished the NWSL season in 3rd place and with a 17–4–5 record. The team advanced past the quarterfinals stage of the playoffs with a 2–1 win over Portland Thorns FC before being eliminated in the semifinals by the Washington Spirit.

Gotham competed in three other competitions, kicking off 2024 with a defeat to 2023 shield winners San Diego Wave FC in the one-match NWSL Challenge Cup. The team later competed in the first edition of the NWSL x Liga MX Femenil Summer Cup, where they made it to the championship match before falling at the hands of the Kansas City Current. Finally, Gotham FC advanced to the knockout stage of the CONCACAF W Champions Cup, played in May 2025.

=== Preseason ===
Gotham FC began preseason by announcing a flurry of departures in early December 2024, including defender Sam Hiatt and midfielders Maitane López and Delanie Sheehan. All three players later signed with fellow NWSL clubs as free agents. On December 10, 2024, the club announced its end-of-year contract statuses. Five players were listed as out of contract: Michelle Betos, Mandy Freeman, McCall Zerboni, and forwards Svava Rós Guðmundsdóttir, Midge Purce, and Jéssica Silva. While Freeman and Silva both re-signed with Gotham, the club announced that veteran midfielder Zerboni would not be returning to Gotham in 2025.

Gotham continued to make roster moves in the form of trades as the new year approached. On December 20, the club executed a trade with Seattle Reign FC, involving the move of Lynn Williams and Cassie Miller to Seattle while also obtaining midfielder Jaelin Howell. Another attacking departure occurred one week later, with Yazmeen Ryan being traded to the Houston Dash in exchange for a record-high sum of allocation money.

Several players were subsequently signed, filling in the gaps left behind by the club's departures. As part of the NWSL's transition from a college draft to free agency, Gotham signed Sarah Schupansky, Lilly Reale, Khyah Harper, and Ryan Campbell to their first professional contracts. The club also signed international players Stella Nyamekye and Gabi Portilho in late December. On January 17, the club traded goalkeeper Abby Smith to the Houston Dash for $20,000 in intra-league transfer funds.

== Team ==
=== Current squad ===
As of June 11, 2025

No.	Nat.	Name	Date of birth (age)	Since	Previous team	Notes (Note: denotes a season-ending injury.)
Goalkeepers
1	(United States)	Shelby Hogan	May 10, 1998 (aged 26)	2025	(United States) Portland Thorns FC	
12	(United States)	Ryan Campbell	March 18, 2002 (aged 22)	2025	(United States) UCLA Bruins	
26	(United States)	Tyler McCamey	August 19, 2001 (aged 23)	2025	(United States) Princeton Tigers	IRP
30	(Germany)	Ann-Katrin Berger	October 9, 1990 (aged 34)	2024	(England) Chelsea	INT
33	(United States)	Michelle Betos	February 20, 1988 (aged 37)	2025	(United States) Gotham FC	IRP
Defenders
3	(Brazil)	Bruninha	June 16, 2002 (aged 22)	2022	(Brazil) Santos	INT
4	(United States)	Lilly Reale	November 28, 2000 (aged 24)	2025	(United States) UCLA Bruins	
6	(United States)	Emily Sonnett	November 25, 1993 (aged 31)	2024	(United States) OL Reign	
15	(United States)	Tierna Davidson	September 19, 1998 (aged 26)	2024	(United States) Chicago Red Stars	
19	(United States)	Kayla Duran	September 29, 1999 (aged 25)	2025	(United States) USC Trojans	IRP
22	(United States)	Mandy Freeman	March 23, 1995 (aged 29)	2017	(United States) USC Trojans	
24	(United States)	Emerson Elgin	March 21, 2003 (aged 21)	2025	(United States) North Carolina Tar Heels	IRP
27	(England)	Jess Carter	October 27, 1997 (aged 27)	2024	(England) Chelsea	
Midfielders
7	(United States)	Jaelin Howell	November 21, 1999 (aged 25)	2025	(United States) Seattle Reign FC	INT
8	(United States)	Taryn Torres	April 23, 1999 (aged 25)	2021	(United States) Virginia Cavaliers	
14	(United States)	Nealy Martin	April 22, 1998 (aged 26)	2023	(United States) Racing Louisville FC	
16	(United States)	Rose Lavelle	May 14, 1995 (aged 29)	2024	(United States) OL Reign	
21	(United States)	Sofia Cook	August 7, 2004 (aged 20)	2025	(United States) UCLA Bruins	
90	(Ghana)	Stella Nyamekye	September 18, 2005 (aged 19)	2025	(Ghana) Dreamz Ladies	INT
5	(Denmark)	Josefine Hasbo	November 20, 2001 (aged 23)	2025	(United States) Harvard Crimson	INT
Forwards
9	(Spain)	Esther González	December 8, 1992 (aged 32)	2023	(Spain) Real Madrid	INT
10	(Brazil)	Geyse	March 27, 1998 (aged 26)	2025	(England) Manchester United W.F.C.	INT
11	(United States)	Sarah Schupansky	August 25, 2003 (aged 21)	2025	(United States) Pittsburgh Panthers	
13	(United States)	Ella Stevens	December 11, 1997 (aged 27)	2024	(United States) Chicago Red Stars	
17	(United States)	Mak Whitham	July 27, 2010 (aged 14)	2024	(United States) Slammers FC HB Køge	U18
18	(Brazil)	Gabi Portilho	July 18, 1995 (aged 29)	2025	(Brazil) Corinthians	INT
20	(Portugal)	Jéssica Silva	December 11, 1994 (aged 30)	2024	(Portugal) Benfica	INT
23	(United States)	Midge Purce	September 18, 1995 (aged 29)	2020	(United States) Portland Thorns FC	INT
28	(United States)	Katie Stengel	February 29, 1992 (aged 33)	2025	(England) Crystal Palace	IRP
34	(United States)	Khyah Harper	August 15, 2002 (aged 23)	2025	(United States) Minnesota Golden Gophers	

=== Technical staff ===
As of January 9, 2025

Technical staff
Role	Name
General manager Head of soccer operations	(United States) Yael Averbuch West
Head coach	(Spain) Juan Carlos Amorós
Assistant coaches	(United States) Jennifer Lalor
Assistant coaches	Shaun Harris
Assistant coaches	Ak Lakhani
Goalkeeper coach	Brody Sams
Head of sports science	Phillip Congleton
Strength and conditioning coach	Adrián Benítez Jiménez
Head of medical Physical therapist	Erin Morton

== Competitions ==
Win Draw Loss

=== Friendlies ===
February 26	Fort Lauderdale United FC	1–2	Gotham FC	Davie, Florida
7:00 pm ET	Hamid 90+1'	Report	Esther 19'; Howell 29'	Stadium: Beyond Bancard Stadium

March 2	Tampa Bay Sun FC	1–1 (2–4 p)	Gotham FC	Tampa, Florida
6:00 p.m. ET	Goins 15'	Report	Portilho 3'	Stadium: Riverfront Stadium

=== Regular season ===
March 15 1	Seattle Reign FC	1–1	Gotham FC	Seattle, Washington
10:00 pm ET	Huitema (yellow card) 42'; Bugg (yellow card) 52'; Adames 71'	Report	Portilho (yellow card) 38', (goal) 47'; Schupansky (yellow card) 66'; Howell (yellow card) 74'; Freeman (red card) 87'	Stadium: Lumen Field; Attendance: 8,467; Referee: Alexandra Billeter

March 23 2	Gotham FC	0–2	Orlando Pride	Harrison, New Jersey
2:00 pm ET	Carter (yellow card) 45+1'; Stevens (yellow card) 70'	Report	Reale 2' (o.g.); Watt (yellow card) 7'; Marta 45+2' (pen.)	Stadium: Sports Illustrated Stadium; Attendance: 9,718; Referee: Brad Jensen

March 28 3	Houston Dash	0–0	Gotham FC	Houston, Texas
6:00 pm ET	Olivieri (yellow card) 52'; Graham (yellow card) 80'	Report	Bruninha (yellow card) 36'	Stadium: Shell Energy Stadium; Referee: Shawn Tehini

April 13 4	Gotham FC	3–1	North Carolina Courage	Harrison, New Jersey
1:00 pm ET	Stevens (yellow card) 26'; Esther 43', 45+4'; Reale 46'	Report	Jackson (yellow card) 79'; Pinto 90+4'	Stadium: Sports Illustrated Stadium; Attendance: 7,115; Referee: Joshua Encarnación

April 18 5	Angel City FC	0–4	Gotham FC	Los Angeles, California
10:30 pm ET	Hodge (yellow card) 32'	Report	Esther 18', 75'; Portilho (yellow card) 58'; Moriya 67' (o.g.); Torres (yellow card) 81'; Geyse 85'	Stadium: BMO Stadium; Attendance: 18,465; Referee: Danielle Chesky

April 22 6	Portland Thorns FC	4–1	Gotham FC	Portland, Oregon
10:30 pm ET	Alidou 7'; Reyes (yellow card) 53'; Hanks 61'; Perry 73' (pen.); Castellanos 80'	Report	Esther 8'; Torres (yellow card) 51'	Stadium: Providence Park; Attendance: 15,373; Referee: John Griggs

April 26 7	Washington Spirit	0–3	Gotham FC	Washington, D.C.
10:00 am ET	Miura (yellow card) 51'	Report	Schupansky 3'; Martin (yellow card) 11'; Esther 32' (pen.), 39'; Reale (yellow card) 45+6'; Howell (yellow card) 85'	Stadium: Audi Field; Attendance: 16,443; Referee: Abdou Ndiaye

May 4 8	Gotham FC	0–0	Chicago Stars FC	Harrison, New Jersey
10:00 am ET	Howell (yellow card) 90+4'	Report	Nesbeth (yellow card) 90+2'; Curran (yellow card) 90+2'	Stadium: Sports Illustrated Stadium; Attendance: 7,330; Referee: Adorae Monroy

May 9 9	Racing Louisville FC	1–0	Gotham FC	Louisville, Kentucky
5:00 pm ET	Fischer (yellow card) 16'; Flint 56'	Report	Howell (yellow card) 7'; Geyse (yellow card) 55'; Torres (yellow card) 84'	Stadium: Lynn Family Stadium; Attendance: 5,495; Referee: Muhammad Hassan

May 16 10	Gotham FC	0–1	San Diego Wave FC	Harrison, New Jersey
7:30 pm ET	Harper (yellow card) 90+2'	Report	Dali (yellow card) 6'; Ascanio 30'; Corley (yellow card) 78'	Stadium: Sports Illustrated Stadium; Attendance: 7,819; Referee: Thomas Snyder

June 7 11	Gotham FC	1–2	Kansas City Current	Harrison, New Jersey
10:00 am ET	Sonnett (yellow card) 33'; Geyse (yellow card) 85'; DiBernardo 90+11' (o.g.)	Report	Cooper 3'; Chawinga 11'; Mace (yellow card) 40'; Sharples (yellow card) 67'	Stadium: Sports Illustrated Stadium; Attendance: 10,399; Referee: Danielle Chesky

June 13 12	Utah Royals	0–3	Gotham FC	Sandy, Utah
9:30 pm ET		Report	González 9' 58' (pen.); Howell 45+1' (yellow card) 87' (red card) 90+6'; Carter (red card) 76'	Stadium: America First Field; Attendance: 8,351; Referee: Iryna Petrunok

June 21 13	Gotham FC	2–1	Bay FC	Harrison, New Jersey
7:30 pm ET	González 30' (yellow card) 90+3'; Schupansky (yellow card) 41'; Geyse 55'; Dahlkemper (yellow card) 86'	Report	Hocking 11'; Conti (yellow card) 45'; Bebar (yellow card) 45+7'	Stadium: Sports Illustrated Stadium; Attendance: 9,009; Referee: Shawn Tehini

August 1 14	Chicago Stars FC	1–1	Gotham FC	Bridgeview, Illinois
8:00 pm ET	Schlegel 68'	Report	Harper 39'	Stadium: SeatGeek Stadium; Attendance: 2,874; Referee: Muhammad Hassan

August 9 15	Gotham FC	0–0	Washington Spirit	Harrison, New Jersey
12:00 pm ET	Geyse (red card) 30'; Lavelle (yellow card) 59'; González (yellow card) 72'	Report	Wiesner (yellow card) 11'; Miura (yellow card) 61'	Stadium: Sports Illustrated Stadium; Attendance: 13,860; Referee: Jaclyn Metz

August 17 16	Gotham FC	1–2	Houston Dash	Harrison, New Jersey
4:00 pm ET	González 8'	Report	Sonnett 51' (o.g.); Chapman (yellow card) 72'; Alozie 90+3'	Stadium: Sports Illustrated Stadium; Attendance: 7,519; Referee: Elijio Arreguin

August 23 17	Gotham FC	0–0	Utah Royals	Harrison, New Jersey
7:30 pm ET		Report	Lacasse (yellow card) 61'; Rábano (yellow card) 79'; Del Fava (yellow card) 90+1'	Stadium: Sports Illustrated Stadium; Attendance: 4,446; Referee: Gerald Flores

August 29 18	Orlando Pride	0–2	Gotham FC	Orlando, Florida
8:00 pm ET	Rafaelle (yellow card) 22'	Report	González 13'; Howell 45+1'; Portilho (yellow card) 45+3'; Sonnett (yellow card) 90+3'	Stadium: Inter&Co Stadium; Attendance: 7,132; Referee: Matthew Corrigan

September 7 19	Gotham FC	3–1	Angel City FC	Harrison, New Jersey
5:00 pm ET	Portilho 47'; Lavelle 51'; Howell 68'	Report	Fuller 2'; Doorsoun (yellow card) 83'	Stadium: Sports Illustrated Stadium; Attendance: 8,890; Referee: Greg Dopka

September 12 20	San Diego Wave FC	0–2	Gotham FC	San Diego, California
10:00 pm ET	Corley (yellow card) 67'	Report	Geyse (yellow card) 40'; González 45'; Sonnett (yellow card) 55'; Shaw 79'	Stadium: Snapdragon Stadium; Attendance: 10,403; Referee: Brandon Stevis

September 21 21	Bay FC	1–1	Gotham FC	San Jose, California
8:30 pm ET	Kundananji 68'	Report	Lavelle 36'; Schupansky (yellow card) 90+3'	Stadium: PayPal Park; Attendance: 11,193; Referee: Brad Jensen

September 26 22	Gotham FC	3–0	Portland Thorns FC	Harrison, New Jersey
8:00 pm ET	Purce 10'; Lavelle 43'; Stengel 73'	Report	Moultrie (yellow card) 90+1'	Stadium: Sports Illustrated Stadium; Attendance: 8,522; Referee: Alyssa Nichols

October 5 23	Gotham FC	0–0	Seattle Reign FC	Harrison, New Jersey
4:00 pm ET	Purce (yellow card) 70'	Report	Bugg (yellow card) 13'; Mondésir (yellow card) 58'	Stadium: Sports Illustrated Stadium; Attendance: 9,752; Referee: Elvis Osmanovic

October 11 24	Kansas City Current	2–0	Gotham FC	Kansas City, Missouri
5:00 pm ET	Bia Zaneratto 34'; Chawinga 51'; Hutton (yellow card) 62'	Report	Howell (yellow card) 40'; Sonnett (yellow card) 85'	Stadium: CPKC Stadium; Attendance: 11,500; Referee: Nabil Bensalah

October 19 25	Gotham FC	2–2	Racing Louisville FC	Harrison, New Jersey
3:00 pm ET	Howell 15'; Bruninha (yellow card) 53'; Sonnett (yellow card) 67'; Lavelle 85'	Report	Sonis 29'; Weber 65'; Flint (yellow card) 84'	Stadium: Sports Illustrated Stadium; Attendance: 11,219; Referee: Alexandra Billeter

November 2 26	North Carolina Courage	3–2	Gotham FC	Cary, North Carolina
	Speck 14'; Matsukubo 16'; Carter 51' (o.g.)	Report	Stengel (yellow card) 77'; Lavelle 87' (pen.); Portilho 90+5'	Stadium: WakeMed Soccer Park; Attendance: 11,170; Referee: Abdou Ndiaye

==== Regular-season standings ====
Pos	Team	Pld	W	D	L	GF	GA	GD	Pts	Qualification
6	San Diego Wave FC	26	10	7	9	41	34	+7	37	Playoffs
7	Racing Louisville FC	26	10	7	9	35	38	−3	37	Playoffs
8	Gotham FC (C)	26	9	9	8	35	25	+10	36	Playoffs and CONCACAF W Champions Cup
9	North Carolina Courage	26	9	8	9	37	39	−2	35	
10	Houston Dash	26	8	6	12	27	39	−12	30	

Source: NWSL
Rules for classification: 1) points; 2) total goal difference; 3) total wins; 4) total goals scored; 5) head-to-head points; 6) head-to-head goals scored; 7) fewest disciplinary points; 8) coin toss (if 2 clubs tied) or drawing of lots (if ≥3 clubs tied).
(C) Champions

=== NWSL playoffs ===
==== Bracket ====
Quarterfinals
1	Kansas City Current	1
8	Gotham FC (a.e.t.)	2
4	Orlando Pride	2
5	Seattle Reign FC	0
2	Washington Spirit (p)	1 (3)
7	Racing Louisville FC	1 (1)
3	Portland Thorns FC (a.e.t.)	1
6	San Diego Wave FC	0

Semifinals
8	Gotham FC	1
4	Orlando Pride	0
2	Washington Spirit	2
3	Portland Thorns FC	0

Championship
8	Gotham FC	1
2	Washington Spirit	0

==== Results ====
November 9 Quarterfinals	Kansas City Current	1–2 (a.e.t.)	Gotham FC	Kansas City, Missouri
12:30 pm EST	Wheeler 90+6'	Report	Shaw 68'; Stengel 120+1'	Stadium: CPKC Stadium; Attendance: 11,500; Referee: Elijio Arreguin

November 16 Semifinals	Orlando Pride	0–1	Gotham FC	Orlando, Florida
3:00 pm EST		Report	Shaw 90+7'	Stadium: Inter&Co Stadium; Attendance: 15,714; Referee: Alyssa Pennington

Championship

November 22, 2025
5:00 PST

Washington Spirit	0–1	Gotham FC
	Report	Lavelle 80'

PayPal Park, San Jose, California
Attendance: 18,000
Referee: Natalie Simon (Florida)

=== 2024–25 CONCACAF W Champions Cup ===
Pos	Team	Pld	W	D	L	GF	GA	GD	Pts	Qualification	TUA	NYJ	MON	LDA	FRA
1	(Mexico) Tigres UANL	4	3	1	0	18	6	+12	10	Advance to knockout stage	—	—	4–0	3–1	—
2	(United States) NJ/NY Gotham	4	2	2	0	21	4	+17	8	Advance to knockout stage	4–4	—	0–0	—	—
3	(Mexico) Monterrey	4	2	1	1	8	4	+4	7		—	—	—	3–0	5–0
4	(Costa Rica) Alajuelense	4	1	0	3	6	10	−4	3		—	0–4	—	—	5–0
5	(Jamaica) Frazsiers Whip	4	0	0	4	1	30	−29	0		1–7	0–13	—	—	—

Source: CONCACAF
Rules for classification: Tiebreakers

==== Group stage ====
September 5, 2024 1	Alajuelense (Costa Rica)	0–4	(United States) Gotham FC	Alajuela, Costa Rica
8:00 p.m. EDT (UTC-4)		Report	Gonzalez 3'; Stengel 31' (pen.); Nighswonger 45+1'; Sheehan 54'	Stadium: Estadio Alejandro Morera Soto; Referee: Merlin Soto (Honduras)

September 19, 2024 2	Gotham FC (United States)	0–0	(Mexico) C.F. Monterrey Feminil	Harrison, United States
7:00 p.m. EDT (UTC-4)		Report		Stadium: Red Bull Arena

October 2, 2024 3	Frazsiers Whip (Jamaica)	0–13	(United States) Gotham FC	Kingston, Jamaica
8:00 p.m. EDT (UTC-4)		Report	Ryan 13', 18', 90+2'; Freeman 39'; Kizer 45+5'; Nighswonger 47'; Torres 52', 53'; Williams 82', 86', 90+3'; Silva 84'; Able 85' (o.g.)	Stadium: National Stadium; Referee: Amairany Garcìa (Mexico)

October 16, 2024 4	Gotham FC (United States)	4–4	(Mexico) Tigres Femenil	Harrison, United States
8:00 p.m. EDT (UTC-4)	Zerboni 4'; González 21'; Sheehan 42'; López 71'	Report	Mayor 6'; Dias 15', 25'; Ovalle 60' (pen.)	Stadium: Red Bull Arena; Referee: Astrid Gramajo (Guatemala)

==== Semifinals ====
May 21, 2025	Club América (Mexico)	1–3	Gotham FC (United States)	San Nicolás de los Garza, Mexico
6:30 pm ET	Guerrero 38'; Saldívar (yellow card) 73'	Report	Geyse 21'; Purce 30' (pen.); Gutiérrez 33' (o.g.); Reale (yellow card) 62'	Stadium: Estadio Universitario; Referee: Odette Hamilton

==== Final ====
May 24, 2025	Tigres Femenil (Mexico)	0–1	Gotham FC (United States)	San Nicolás de los Garza, Mexico
9:00 pm ET	Ovalle (yellow card) 90'	Report	Esther 82'; Stevens (yellow card) 89'	Stadium: Estadio Universitario; Referee: Marianela Araya Cruz

=== 2025–26 CONCACAF W Champions Cup ===
==== Group B ====
Pos	Team	Pld	W	D	L	GF	GA	GD	Pts	Qualification	WAS	GFC	MON	VNR	ALI
1	(United States) Washington Spirit	4	3	1	0	15	0	+15	10	Advanced to knockout stage	—	—	4–0	4–0	—
2	(United States) Gotham FC	4	3	1	0	8	2	+6	10	Advanced to knockout stage	0–0	—	2–1	—	—
3	(Mexico) Monterrey	4	2	0	2	13	6	+7	6		—	—	—	4–0	8–0
4	(Canada) Vancouver Rise Academy	4	1	0	3	9	12	−3	3		—	1–4	—	—	8–0
5	(El Salvador) Alianza	4	0	0	4	0	25	−25	0		0–7	0–2	—	—	—

Source: CONCACAF
Rules for classification: Tiebreakers

===== Results =====
August 20 Group Stage	Gotham FC (United States)	2–1	(Mexico) Monterrey	New York, United States
7:00 pm	Bruninha 6'; Harper 24'	Report	Restrepo 32'	Stadium: Icahn Stadium; Referee: Vimarest Diaz

September 2 Group Stage	Alianza (El Salvador)	0–2	(United States) Gotham FC	San Salvador, El Salvador
9:00 pm		Report	Geyse 62' (pen.); Duran 90+4'	Stadium: Estadio Jorge "El Mágico" González; Referee: Astrid Gramajo

September 16 Group Stage	Vancouver Rise FC (Canada)	1–4	(United States) Gotham FC	Burnaby, Canada
10:00 pm	Bout 14'	Report	Hasbo 9'; Stengel 12'; González 46'; Bruninha 90+3'	Stadium: Swangard Stadium; Referee: Lizzet Amairany García Olvera

October 1 Group Stage	Gotham FC (United States)	0–0	(United States) Washington Spirit	Chester, United States
7:00 pm		Report		Stadium: Subaru Park; Referee: Janeishka Caban

== Transactions ==
=== Contract operations ===
Date	Player	Pos.	Notes	Ref.
December 19, 2024	(United States) Mandy Freeman	DF	Re-signed to a two-year contract.	
December 31, 2024	(Portugal) Jéssica Silva	FW	Re-signed to a short-term contract through June 30, 2025.	
February 5, 2025	(United States) Midge Purce	FW	Re-signed to a one-year contract.	
May 15, 2025	(Spain) Esther González	GK	Re-signed through the 2027 NWSL season.	
June 23, 2025	(United States) Jaelin Howell	MF	Extended through the 2027 NWSL season.	
July 16, 2025	(United States) Tierna Davidson	DF	Extended through the 2027 NWSL season.	
July 18, 2025	(United States) Taryn Torres	MF	Extended through the 2027 NWSL season.	
July 30, 2025	(Brazil) Bruninha	DF	Extended through the 2027 NWSL season.	
August 8, 2025	(United States) Kayla Duran	DF	Extended through February 2026.	
August 12, 2025	(United States) Ryan Campbell	GK	Extended through the 2028 NWSL season.	
September 15, 2025	(United States) Sarah Schupansky	MF	Extended through the 2027 NWSL season.	
September 19, 2025	(United States) Khyah Harper	FW	Extended through the 2026 NWSL season.	

=== Loans in ===
Date	Player	Pos.	Previous club	Fee/notes	Ref.
March 24, 2025	(Brazil) Geyse	FW	(England) Manchester United	Loaned through the 2025 NWSL season. Includes an option for a permanent transfer.	

=== Loans out ===
Date	Player	Pos.	Destination club	Fee/notes	Ref.
August 28, 2025	(Ghana) Stella Nyamekye	MF	(United States) Fort Lauderdale United FC	Loaned through the end of 2025. Includes a mutual option to extend through the end of the 2025–26 USL Super League season.	
September 9, 2025	(England) Princess Ademiluyi	FW	(United States) Fort Lauderdale United FC	Loaned through the end of 2025. Includes a mutual option to extend through the end of the 2025–26 USL Super League season.	

=== Transfers in ===
Date	Player	Pos.	Previous club	Fee/notes	Ref.
December 20, 2024	(United States) Jaelin Howell	MF	(United States) Seattle Reign FC	Traded, along with $70,000 in allocation money and a 2025 international roster spot, in exchange for Cassie Miller and Lynn Williams.	
December 23, 2024	(United States) Sarah Schupansky	FW	(United States) Pittsburgh Panthers	Free agent rookie signed to a two-year contract with a club option.	
December 24, 2024	(Ghana) Stella Nyamekye	MF	(Ghana) Dreamz Ladies F.C.	Acquired in exchange for an undisclosed transfer fee and signed to a three-year contract with a mutual option.	
December 30, 2024	(Brazil) Gabi Portilho	FW	(Brazil) Corinthians	Signed to a two-year contract with an option.	
December 31, 2024	(United States) Shelby Hogan	GK	(United States) Portland Thorns FC	Traded, along with $40,000 in allocation money, in exchange for $10,000 in intra-league transfer funds and a 2025 international roster spot.	
January 3, 2025	(United States) Lilly Reale	DF	(United States) UCLA Bruins	Rookie signed to a three-year contract.	
January 8, 2025	(United States) Khyah Harper	FW	(United States) Minnesota Golden Gophers	Rookie signed to a one-year contract.	
January 10, 2025	(United States) Ryan Campbell	GK	(United States) UCLA Bruins	Rookie signed to a one-year contract.	
January 29, 2025	(United States) Sofia Cook	MF	(United States) UCLA Bruins	Rookie signed to a two-year contract with a mutual option.	
April 12, 2025	(United States) Michelle Betos	GK	(United States) Gotham FC	Signed to a short-term injury replacement contract.	
April 12, 2025	(United States) Emerson Elgin	DF	(United States) North Carolina Tar Heels	Signed to a short-term injury replacement contract.	
April 17, 2025	(United States) Tyler McCamey	GK	(United States) Princeton Tigers	Signed to a short-term injury replacement contract.	
June 10, 2025	(Denmark) Josefine Hasbo	MF	(United States) Harvard Crimson	Signed to a three-year contract through 2027.	
July 14, 2025	(United States) Meg Boade	MF	(United States) UCLA Bruins	Signed to national team replacement player contracts.	
July 14, 2025	(United States) Kayla Duran	DF	(United States) USC Trojans	Signed to national team replacement player contracts.	
July 31, 2025	(United States) Katie Stengel	FW	(England) Crystal Palace	Acquired in exchange for an undisclosed transfer fee and signed through February 2026.	
September 1, 2025	(England) Princess Ademiluyi	FW	(England) West Ham United	Acquired in exchange for an undisclosed transfer fee.	
September 11, 2025	(United States) Jaedyn Shaw	MF	(United States) North Carolina Courage	Acquired in exchange for an NWSL-record $1.25 million in intra-league transfer funds.	

=== Transfers out ===
Date	Player	Pos.	Destination club	Fee/notes	Ref.
December 4, 2024	(United States) Delanie Sheehan	MF	(United States) Houston Dash	Free agent.	
December 5, 2024	(Spain) Maitane López	MF	(United States) Chicago Stars FC	Free agent.	
December 6, 2024	(United States) Sam Hiatt	DF	(United States) Portland Thorns FC	Free agent.	
December 10, 2024	(United States) Michelle Betos	GK	(United States) Gotham FC	Out of contract.	
December 10, 2024	(Iceland) Svava Rós Guðmundsdóttir	FW	Retirement	Out of contract.	
December 10, 2024	(United States) McCall Zerboni	MF	Retirement	Out of contract.	
December 20, 2024	(United States) Cassie Miller	GK	(United States) Seattle Reign FC	Both players traded in exchange for $70,000 in allocation money, a 2025 international roster spot, and Jaelin Howell.	
December 20, 2024	(United States) Lynn Williams	FW	(United States) Seattle Reign FC	Both players traded in exchange for $70,000 in allocation money, a 2025 international roster spot, and Jaelin Howell.	
December 27, 2024	(United States) Yazmeen Ryan	MF	(United States) Houston Dash	Traded, along with $80,000 in intra-league transfer funds, in exchange for $400,000 in allocation money and a 2025 international roster spot.	
January 17, 2025	(United States) Abby Smith	GK	(United States) Houston Dash	Traded in exchange for $20,000 in intra-league transfer funds.	
January 31, 2025	(United States) Crystal Dunn	FW	(France) Paris Saint-Germain	Mutual contract termination.	
April 17, 2025	(United States) Cece Kizer	FW	(United States) Utah Royals	Mutual contract termination.	
June 20, 2025	(United States) Emerson Elgin	DF	(United States) Boston Legacy FC	Out of contract.	
June 20, 2025	(United States) Tyler McCamey	GK	(United States) Kansas City Current	Out of contract.	
June 20, 2025	(Portugal) Jéssica Silva	FW	(Saudi Arabia) Al Hilal	Out of contract.	
August 22, 2025	(United States) Meg Boade	MF	(United States) Chicago Stars FC	Out of contract.	
