= Kaladan Park, Tamale =

Sports venue in Tamale, Ghana

Coordinates: 9.3986°N 0.8462°W

Kaladan Park, Tamale also known as the Sakora Park is a multi purpose stadium located in the Tamale Metropolitan Assembly. It served as the fountain of football in the northern part of Ghana.

== History ==
The Kaladan Park is an old and pride site for the people of Tamale. It served as a venue hosting for activities such as sports, athletics, Eid festivities etc. It was the home ground of Real Tamale United (RTU) football club before they moved to the then Tamale Sports Stadium now Aliu Mahama Sports Stadium in the year 2008 after the African Cup of Nations Tournament in Ghana. Abede Pele, one of the Ghanaian football legends has his early football career made from the park. In May 2025, after a battle with some authorities, the National Sports Authority won the case and has taken the mandate as part of their regulations the management of the stadium.
