= Faith Ladies F.C. =

Football team in Ghana

- Full name: Faith Ladies Football Club
- Founded: 2004; 22 years ago
- Stadium: Carl Reindorf Park Stadium
- CEO: Ebenezer Allotey
- Head Coach: Reginald Asante
- League: Ghana Women’s Premier League
- 2021–22: Ghana Women’s Premier League, 2nd Place in Southern Zone

Faith Ladies F.C. is a Ghanaian professional women's football club based in Dansoman in the Greater Accra Region of Ghana. The club features in the Ghana Women’s Premier League (GWPL). The club was formed in 2004. The club plays their home matches at the Carl Reindorf Park in Dansoman.

== History ==
In 2004, the club was formed in Dansoman, a suburban town in Greater Accra Region of Ghana as one of the women's association football clubs in Ghana. In 2021, the club won the Greater Accra Regional Football Association (GARFA) Women's Division One League Zone A to qualify for the Regional Women's Zonal playoff and champions of champions (championship final for the GARFA Women's League). They won the championship final against Army Ladies and won the Regional Women's Zonal playoff for the Southern Zone to qualify for the Ghana Women's Premier League for the first time in the club's history.

Prior to the start of their first top flight season, the club appointed Edna Quagraine as the club's head coach. In their debut season (2021–22 season) in the GWPL, they placed second in the Southern Zone behind Hasaacas Ladies. Their second-place finish earned them qualification into the Ghana Women's Super Cup.

On 25 September 2022, they won the 2022 Ghana Women's Super Cup defeating the League Champions, Ampem Darkoa by 3–1 in the final.

== Honours ==
=== Domestic ===
- Ghana Women's Super Cup

Winners (1): 2022

- GARFA Women's Division One League

Winners (1): 2020–21

- Division One Regional Women's Zonal League

Winners (1): 2021

== See also ==
- Women's football in Ghana
