= Thunder Queens F.C. =

Football club in Ghana

- Full name: Thunder Queens Football Club
- Founded: 2010; 15 years ago
- Ground: Tema Community 8 park
- Owner: Anas Seidu Thunder
- Coach: Edna Quagraine
- League: Ghana Women’s Premier League

Thunder Queens F.C. is a Ghanaian professional women's football club based in Accra in the Greater Accra Region of Ghana. The club is in the Ghana Women’s Premier League.

== History ==
Thunder Queens was established in 2010 by Sammy Adamaley and Anas Seidu Thunder as Samaria Ladies Academy. Adameley, who was the co-owner of the club, mutually terminated his contract and left the club, after which Siedu became the sole owner and CEO. In August 2020, the club was rebranded and the name changed to Thunder Queens.

In the 2015–16 season, the club gained promotion to the Southern zone of the Ghana Women's Premier League (GWPL) for the first time. In 2021, the club reached the semi-finals of the 2021 Ghana Women's FA Cup.

== Ground ==
The club plays its home matches at the Tema Community 8 park.

== Notable players ==
For details on notable Thunder Queens F.C. footballers see Category:Thunder Queens F.C. players.

Philicity Asuako, Gladys Amfobea and Gifty Acheampong.
