= Bolga Ghatel =

Ghanaian Women's Football club

Bolga Ghatel Ladies
- Ground: Bolga Sports Stadium
- Manager: Sofo Al-Amin
- League: Ghana Women's Premier League

Bolgatanga Ghatel Ladies, also known as Bolga Ghatel Ladies, is a women's football team based in Bolgatanga in the Upper East Region of Ghana. They were one of the 16 teams to play in the maiden edition of the Ghana Women's Premier League in 2012.
