= Pearl Pia Ladies F.C. =

Football club in Ghana

- Full name: Pearl Pia Ladies Football Club
- Ground: Tamale Stadium, Tamale
- League: Ghana Women’s Premier League

Pearl Pia Ladies F.C. is a Ghanaian professional women's football club based in Tamale in the Northern Region of Ghana. The club features in the Ghana Women’s Premier League.

Peal Pia was founded in the Northern region of Ghana as a women's club with a focus on player development and education. The club has a rivalry with Northern Ladies Football Club as the two teams are located in the Tamale in the Northern Region.

On 21 December 2021, Pearl Pia escaped an armed robbery attack while returning from Techiman en route to Tamale after defeating reigning Northern Zone champions Ampem Darkoa. There were several gunshots fired at their team bus, but no one was hurt.

== Grounds ==
The club plays their home matches at the Aliu Mahama Sports Stadium in Tamale.
