= Stella Nyamekye =

Ghanaian footballer (born 2005)

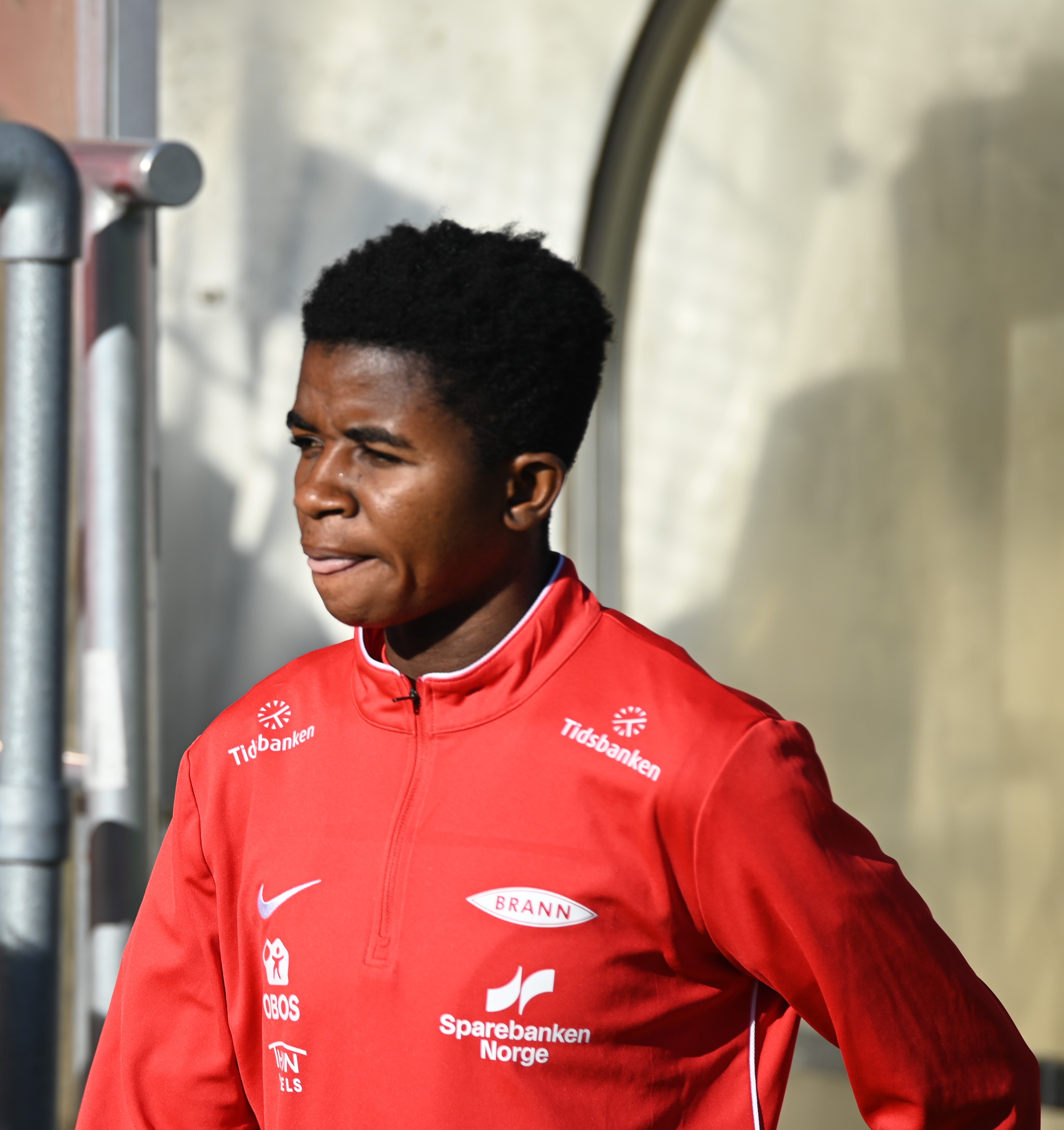

Personal information
- Full name: Stella Nyamekye
- Date of birth: 18 September 2005 (age 21)
- Place of birth: Kumasi, Ghana
- Height: 1.60 m (5 ft 3 in)
- Positions: Midfielder; forward

Team information
- Current team: Brann

Senior career*
Years	Team	Apps	(Gls)
2021–2024	Dreamz Ladies	41	(31)
2025–2026	Gotham FC	2	(0)
2025	→ Fort Lauderdale United (loan)	14	(1)
2026	→ Fort Lauderdale United (loan)	2	(0)
2026–	Brann	0	(0)

International career^{‡}
- Ghana U17
2024	Ghana U20	3	(2)
2024–	Ghana	6	(1)
- * Club domestic league appearances and goals as of 02:21, 4 March 2026 (UTC) ‡ National team caps and goals as of 20:36, 7 September 2025 (UTC)

Stella Nyamekye (born 18 September 2005) is a Ghanaian professional footballer who plays as a midfielder for Norwegian Toppserien club SK Brann and the Ghana national team. She has previously played for Ghana Women's Premier League club Dreamz Ladies, Gotham FC of the NWSL, and USL Super League club Fort Lauderdale United FC.

== Club career ==
=== Dreamz Ladies ===
Nyamekye started her career with Dreamz Ladies in 2021. In 2022, she led the team into the Ghana Women's Premier League after winning the Ashanti Regional Division One League and placing second in the Zonal Playoff championship.

=== Gotham FC ===
Gotham FC announced on 24 December 2024 that they had signed Nyamekye on a three-year contract with an option to extend an additional year. Nyamekye made her NWSL debut on 19 April 2025, entering the match as a second-half substitute for Sarah Schupansky in a 4–0 victory over Angel City FC.

On 28 August 2025, Nyamekye joined USL Super League club Fort Lauderdale United FC on a loan through the remainder of 2025. She made her USL Super League debut on August 30, coming on at halftime in a 2–2 draw with the Carolina Ascent. Nyamekye was temporarily recalled from her loan in January 2026 to join Gotham FC's training camp ahead of the 2026 FIFA Women's Champions Cup. The following month, Gotham sent Nyamekye back on loan to Fort Lauderdale, this time through the end of the 2025–26 USL Super League season. She made 2 more appearances for Fort Lauderdale United before her loan was permanently terminated on 19 February 2026.

=== Brann ===
In March 2026, Gotham FC transferred Nyamekye to Norwegian club SK Brann in exchange for an undisclosed fee.

== International career ==
=== Youth ===
Nyamekye made her youth debut for Ghana at under-17 level in 2022. She went on to feature for Ghana in the 2022 African U-17 Women's World Cup qualifiers. In the final qualification round, she scored the first goal in the first leg to help Ghana to a 2–0 advantage. However, they lost to Morocco on a 4–2 penalties score after the match ended in a 2–2 aggregate missing out on the 2022 FIFA U-17 Women's World Cup.

In 2023, she was promoted to the Ghana U20 Women's team, where she scored a hat-trick in their 11–0 pre-tournament friendly win over Niger. She was named as the captain of the team by Yusif Basigi. She scored four goals in Ghana's 2023 WAFU Zone B U-20 Women's Cup victory.

Nyamekye is an aspiring coach. In 2022, she earned her CAF License D coaching badge at age sixteen whilst playing for the Black Maidens (Ghana under-17 side).

=== Senior ===
Nyamekye received her first call-up to the Ghana women's national team, the Black Queens, in early 2023. She made her senior debut on 19 February 2023, featuring in a 3–0 friendly win over Benin.

In June 2025, she was named in Ghana's provisional squad for the 2024 Women's Africa Cup of Nations in Morocco. She played a key role in midfield throughout the competition, drawing praise for her composure and technical ability. Head coach Morten Björkegren described her performance in the semi-final defeat to Morocco as “outstanding”, highlighting her impact in the first hour of the match. On 25 July 2025, Nyamekye and Ghana clinched the bronze medal after defeating South Africa 4–3 on penalties following a 1–1 draw in the third-place playoff. The result secured Ghana's first WAFCON medal since 2016.

== International goals ==
No.	Date	Venue	Opponent	Score	Result	Competition
1.	26 September 2023	Accra Sports Stadium, Accra, Ghana	Rwanda	5–0	5–0	2024 Women's Africa Cup of Nations qualification
2.	22 July 2025	Rabat Olympic Stadium, Rabat, Morocco	Morocco	1–0	1–1 (a.e.t.) (2–4 p)	2024 Women's Africa Cup of Nations
3.	3 March 2026	Al Hamriya Sports Club Stadium, Al Hamriyah, United Arab Emirates	Russia	1–0	4–0	2026 Pink Ladies Cup

== Honours ==
Dreamz Ladies

- Ashanti Regional Women's Division One League: 2021
- Regional Women's Northern Zone championship runner-up: 2021

Gotham FC

- CONCACAF W Champions Cup: 2024–25
- NWSL: 2025

SK Brann

- Norwegian Women's Cup: 2026
- Norwegian Toppserien: 2026

Ghana U17

- WAFU Zone B U20 Women's Cup: 2023

Ghana

- Women's Africa Cup of Nations third place: 2024

Individual

- Ghana Women's Premier League Discovery of the Season: 2021–22
- Ghana Women's Premier League Player of the Month: January 2022, April 2022, October 2022
