= Gifty Acheampong =

Ghanaian footballer

Personal information
- Date of birth: 5 November 1999 (age 26)
- Place of birth: Koforidua, Ghana
- Height: 1.63 m (5 ft 4 in)
- Position: Forward

Team information
- Current team: Nita FA
- Number: 9

Youth career
- Koforidua Gartel SC

Senior career*
Years	Team	Apps	(Gls)
- Immigration Ladies FC
2017–2018	1207 Antalya Spor	14	(2)
2018–2020	Thunder Queens		
2019	→ Voskhod Stara Maiachka (loan)	6	(2)
2020	Rivers Angels F.C.		
2024	Bagmati Youth Club		
2025–	Nita FA		

International career^{‡}
2016	Ghana U-17	4	(2)
- * Club domestic league appearances and goals as of 14 September 2019 ‡ National team caps and goals as of 8 October 2016

Gifty Acheampong (born 5 November 1999) is a Ghanaian women's footballer who plays as a forward for the Indian Women's League club Nita FA. She played in the Turkish Women's First League for 1207 Antalya Döşemealtı Belediye Spor with jersey number 19. She was a member of the Ghana women's U-17 team.

== Early life ==
Gifty was born in Koforidua, in the Eastern Region of Ghana on 5 November 1999.

She was abandoned by her parents without knowing them, and was adopted by the petty trader couple Acheapong when she was only one month old. She lost her father at a young age, and things got difficult. She was raised by her adoptive mother during her school years. However, she had to drop out the high school as her mother could no more afford to earn her keep. She decided to concentrate on playing football in order to earn money to take care of herself and support her mother financially.

== Club career ==
Acheampong began playing football already at the age of ten in the local club Koforidua Gartel SC. She then moved to Accra, where she joined Immigration Ladies FC. She later joined Samaria Ladies now Thunder Queens in 2018, where she served as the club captain from 2019 to 2020.

Beginning of December 2017, the 1.63 m (5 ft 4 in)-tall forward moved to Turkey to join 1207 Antalya Döşemealtı Belediyespor to play in the Turkish Women's First Football League. In October 2020, she signed for NWFL Premiership side, Rivers Angels F.C.

== International career ==
Acheampong was a member of the Ghana women's national under-17 football team. She took part in four matches of the 2016 FIFA U-17 Women's World Cup - Group D held in Jordan, and scored two goals of three in total.
