= Supreme Ladies F.C. =

Football club in Ghana

- Full name: Supreme Ladies Football Club
- Ground: Okese Park, Ejisu
- League: Ghana Women’s Premier League

Supreme Ladies F.C. is a Ghanaian professional women's football club based in Kumasi in the Ashanti Region of Ghana. The club features in the Ghana Women’s Premier League. Their rivals are Fabulous Ladies and Kumasi Sports Academy Ladies.

== Grounds ==
The club plays their home matches at the Okese Park in Ejisu.

== Notable players ==
In the 2020–21 season, Sandra Owusu-Ansah captained the side, she scored 10 goals ending the season as the club's top goal scorer, before joining Serbian club ZFK Spartak Subotica.
