= Yusif Basigi =

Ghanaian association football manager

Personal information
- Date of birth: 1 March 1972 (age 54)
- Place of birth: Daboya, Ghana
- Position: Left winger

Team information
- Current team: Ghana (U-20 women)

Senior career*
Years	Team	Apps	(Gls)
- Tamale Road Masters
- RC Bobo Dioulasso
- Police National

Managerial career
- 2011: Hasaacas Ladies
- 2011–2013: Ghana (women) assistant coach
- 2013–2017: Ghana (women)
- 2013–2016: Sekondi Hasaacas
- 2013–2024: Hasaacas Ladies
- 2017–2021: Ghana (U-20 women)
- 2022–2024: Ghana (U-20 women)
- 2024–: Simba Queens
- * Club domestic league appearances and goals

Yusif Basigi (born 1 March 1972) is a Ghanaian professional football manager who currently coaches the Simba Queens and the Ghana women's national under-20 football team. He previously coached former Ghana Premier League team; Sekondi Hasaacas in 2016, Ghana women's national under-17 football team and Ghana women's national football team for 5 years from 2012 to 2017.

== Early life and education ==
Yusif Basigi was born on 1 March 1972 in Daboya within the Savannah region of Ghana. He is a trained teacher and has a diploma in Education from the Bagabaga Teacher Training College. He also holds a bachelor's degree in Health, Physical Training and Recreation from the University of Education, Winneba.

He has since then been working as a Physical Education (PE) instructor rising to become the PE coordinator for the Shama District in the Western Region since 2008. In 2004 and 2005, he led the Western Region to win the second cycle regional girls soccer competition. He was awarded as the Western Region most outstanding coach and Western Region coach of the year in 2007 and 2013 respectively. His service and role in the development and promotion of girls' soccer in Western Region Schools Sports Federation, he was honoured by the Ghana Education Service.

== Playing career ==
Basigi developed the interest for football at a tender age, but started playing professionally as a left-winger with Tamale Road Masters a former lower-tier side in Northern Region of Ghana. He moved abroad to play for RC Bobo Dioulasso in Burkina Faso and later returned Ghana to play for Police National in Takoradi.

== Coaching career ==
In 2003, Basigi started taking his coaching badges during GFA president Ben Koufie's 5-year football development plan which involved development of coaches. He went through the ranks attending basic coaching training courses and seminars to earn his coaching licenses, CAF Licence ‘C’, ‘B’ and ‘A’. He has had coaching attachment ZFK Napredak Krusevac, Serbia and ATS Buntentor e.V. at Bremen, Germany. In May 2019, he went on a coaching internship program at the Pick Up Academy at the Crystal Palace National Sports Centre in England.

=== Sekondi Hasaacas ===
Basigi was a technical member of Sekondi Hasaacas. He was part of the team in 2013 when they gained promotion to the Ghana Premier League. He was also the head coach of Sekondi Hasaacas' second and youth team Malavands. In October 2013, he replaced Kobina Amissah as the head coach of the senior team. He led the team to a seventh-place finish at the end of both the 2013–14 and 2015 seasons. He stepped down in October 2016 after the team were relegated in the 2016 season to the Division One League. He has since then been serving as the technical director for the entire Sekondi Hasaacas brand doubling as the head coach of the female side, Hasaacas Ladies.

=== Hasaacas Ladies ===
In 2013, Basigi led Hasaacas Ladies to win the inaugural Ghana Women's Premier League title after winning the Southern Zone league and beating Fabulous Ladies by 2–1 in the championship final through a brace from Jennifer Cudjoe. The following year he led the team to win the Premier League again, beating Fabulous Ladies via a 5–3 penalty shootout in the final after the scores remained goalless in extra time. In December 2015, he led the team to their third consecutive league title this time around beating Northern Zone champions Ampem Darkoa Ladies by a lone goal courtesy Samira Suleman in the 66th minute. In the 2015–16 season, Hasaacas Ladies finished in Southern Zone in first place and qualified for the championship final against Ampem Darkoa Ladies. They however lost in the final by a lone goal scored by Grace Asantewaa via direct free kick, ending the Hasmals three year dominance.

Hasaacas's league form during the 2017 season was not as impressive as in the previous campaigns with the club finishing in fifth place in the Southern Zone league losing out on qualifying for the championship final for the first time in the league's history.

=== Ghana Women ===
Between 2011 and 2013, he served as the assistant coach of the Ghana women's national football team under Kuuku Dadzie. In 2013, Dadzie was sacked and he was appointed as the head coach of the team. Ghana qualified for the 2014 African Women's Championship in Namibia on 8 June 2014, with a 5–0 aggregate win over Ethiopia. After a loss to Algeria, a draw against South Africa and a win against Cameroon, Basigi's side finished the group stage in third place, on points with South Africa, with South Africa qualifying to the next stage due to a better goal difference. In March 2015, Ghana qualified for the 2015 African Games after defeating Zimbabwe by 4–3 aggregate score line in the final round of the qualifiers. Ghana once again finished on the same points with South Africa. The two teams were tied on points, head-to-head record, total goal difference and total goals scored, due to that lots were drawn to determine the who qualifies to the next stage, which Ghana won. Ghana went on to win against Ivory Coast in semi-finals via 15th-minute goal by Samira Suleman and reached the final of the Football at the African Games for the second consecutive time. In the final at Stade Alphonse Massemba-Débat, Brazzaville, a late 88th-minute goal from striker Portia Boakye saw Ghana win by 1–0 against Cameroon, serving as a revenge after losing to the Indomitable Lionesses in the 2011 edition and winning the title for the first time in Ghana's history.

Following their 2015 African Games victory, Basigi led Ghana to qualify for the 2016 Africa Women Cup of Nations after beating Tunisia 6–1 on aggregate in the final qualifying round. Basigi felt that his side were one of the favorites to lift the trophy. At the competition, Ghana finished as runners-up of Group B which included West African counterparts Nigeria and Mali along with debutants Kenya. The team beat Kenya by 3–1 in their first group match, drew 1–1 against rivals Nigeria and won by 3–1 against Mali in their final group match to finish on 7 points, level with group winners Nigeria to qualify to the semi-finals.

In the semi-finals, Ghana lost to Cameroon by a lone-goal from Raissa Feudjio. Following a 1–0 victory over South Africa in the third place play-off via a 49th-minute header from defender Linda Eshun, Ghana ended the Africa Women Cup of Nations in third place, their first medal since finishing as runners-up in 2006. In May 2017, Basigi was replaced by Mas-Ud Didi Dramani after 5 years in charge.

=== Ghana Women U20 ===
Basigi was assigned to the Ghana women's national under-20 football team in July 2017, ahead of the 2018 African U-20 Women's World Cup Qualifying Tournament. He led Ghana to win all their matches to qualify for the 2018 FIFA U-20 Women's World Cup with Princella Adubea finishing the tournament as top goalscorer with 10 goals. During the competition, Ghana struggled to score after Adubea suffered an injury ahead of the competition and were eliminated from the group stages after they finished Group A in third place with three points only winning against New Zealand. The team had future senior players including Ernestina Abambila and Sandra Owusu-Ansah who was their captain. On 2 January 2020, the Ghana Football Association dissolved all technical teams of all the national team causing Basigi to lose his role as the head coach of the Black Princesses. However, after 12 days, on 14 January 2020, he was reappointed as the head coach of the team, returning to coach the side after serving as the manager for the team in 2017 to 2020 qualifying them and coaching them for the 2018 FIFA U-20 Women's World Cup.

In May 2021, he was appointed as the assistant coach of the Ghana national under-23 football team, assisting Paa Kwesi Fabin along with Godwin Attram.

On 14 December 2022, the Ghana FA announced the re-appointment of Yusif Basigi as the head coach of the Ghana Women's U20 national team to be assisted by Nana A. Adarkwa and Anita Wiredu-Minta.

== Personal life ==
Basigi is married and has 3 children. In 2016, Basigi likened himself to former Arsenal manager Arsène Wenger because of his expertise to develop promising talents in Ghana just Wenger developed youngsters over the course of his coaching career. In a statement to SportsCrusader, a news outlet in Ghana he refereed himself as the Arsene Wenger of Ghana.

== Honours ==
=== Manager ===
Hasaacas Ladies

- Ghana Women's Premier League (GWPL): 2012–13, 2013–14, 2014–15, 2020–21
- Ghana Women's Special Competition: 2019
- Ghana Women's FA Cup: 2021
- WAFU Zone B Tournament: 2021

Ghana Women U20

- WAFU Zone B U20 Women's Cup: 2023

Ghana Women

- All-Africa Games: 2015
- Africa Women Cup of Nations third place: 2016

Individual

- SWAG Coach of the Year: 2015
- GWPL Coach of the Month: April 2021
- GWPL Coach of the Year: 2021
- Ghana Women's FA Cup Coach of the Year: 2021

== See also ==
- Evans Adotey
