= Kumasi Sports Academy Ladies F.C. =

Football club in Ghana

Kumasi Sports Academy Ladies Football Club
- Full name: Kumasi Sports Academy Ladies Football Club
- Ground: Okese Park, Ejisu
- Manager: Charles Anokye Frimpong
- League: Ghana Women’s Premier League

Kumasi Sports Academy Ladies Football Club is a Ghanaian professional women's football club based in Kumasi in the Ashanti Region of Ghana. The club features in the Ghana Women’s Premier League. Their rivals are Supreme Ladies and Fabulous Ladies.

== Grounds ==
The club plays their home matches at the Okese Park in Ejisu.
