= Women's football in Ghana =

- Country: Ghana
- Governing body: Ghana Football Association
- National team: Women's national team

National competitions
- Ghana Women's Premier League

Club competitions
- Ghana Women's FA Cup

International competitions
- Olympics; FIFA Women's World Cup(National Team); Africa Women Cup of Nations(National Team)

Ghana is traditionally a powerhouse of African Football but the sport is believed to be dying due to lack of corporate sponsorship.

Although popular amongst girls, many experience prejudice and discrimination.

== Domestic football ==
After several years the Ghana FA implemented a Ghana Women's Football League. In 2022 the GWFL has finally gained television sponsorship.

Since 2016, the Ghana Women's FA Cup is played as the top knockout tournament of the Ghanaian association football.

In 2024, to promote women's football in the country, the Ghana Football Association (GFA) launched Football4Girls and Girls for Goals programs across the country.

== National team ==
Ghana have qualified for 3 world cups.

Alberta Sackey and Adjoa Bayor are considered one of the best female players to come from Africa.

== See also ==
- Football in Ghana
- Ghana women's national football team
- List of Women football clubs in Ghana#Ghana (Women) Clubs
