= Soccer Intellectuals Ladies F.C. =

Football club in Ghana

- Full name: Soccer Intellectuals Ladies Football Club
- Ground: Kofi Assansa Park, Ajumako
- League: Ghana Women’s Premier League

Soccer Intellectuals Ladies Football Club is a Ghanaian professional women's football club based in Ajumako - Assasan, within the Ajumako-Enyan-Esiam District in the Central Region of Ghana. The club features in the Ghana Women’s Premier League. The club is a founding member of the league.

== Grounds ==
The club plays their home matches at the Kofi Assansa Park in Ajumako.

== Notable players ==
In the 2020–21 season, Mary Essiful captained the side.
