= Aliu Mahama Sports Stadium =

Football stadium in Tamale, Ghana

Coordinates: 9°24′35″N 0°51′42″W

- Interactive map of Aliu Mahama Sports Stadium
- Former names: Tamale Sports Stadium
- Location: Tamale, Ghana
- Owner: NSC/RCC
- Capacity: 20,000

Construction
- Opened: 2008

Tenants
- Real Tamale United; Steadfast FC; Northern Ladies FC; Ghana national football team

The Aliu Mahama Sports Stadium, formerly Tamale Sports Stadium, is a multipurpose stadium in Tamale, Ghana, mostly used for football matches as well as a place for hosting events such as entertainment concerts and album shows and serves as the home stadium of Real Tamale United, Tamale City FC, Northern City FC and Steadfast FC.

The stadium was completed in 2008 by the Shanghai Construction Group of China. The stadium looks similar to the Sekondi-Takoradi Stadium. The stadium, which hosted some matches during the 2008 African Cup of Nations, has a capacity of about 20,000.

In December 2017, Tamale Sports Stadium was renamed Aliu Mahama Sports Stadium after the late Alhaji Aliu Mahama, the former vice-president of Ghana.

== Management crisis ==
The tamale sports stadium has face several crises, including the disconnection of electricity by NEDco over nonpayment of bills.

== Gallery ==
Aliu Mahama Sports Stadium

Exterior

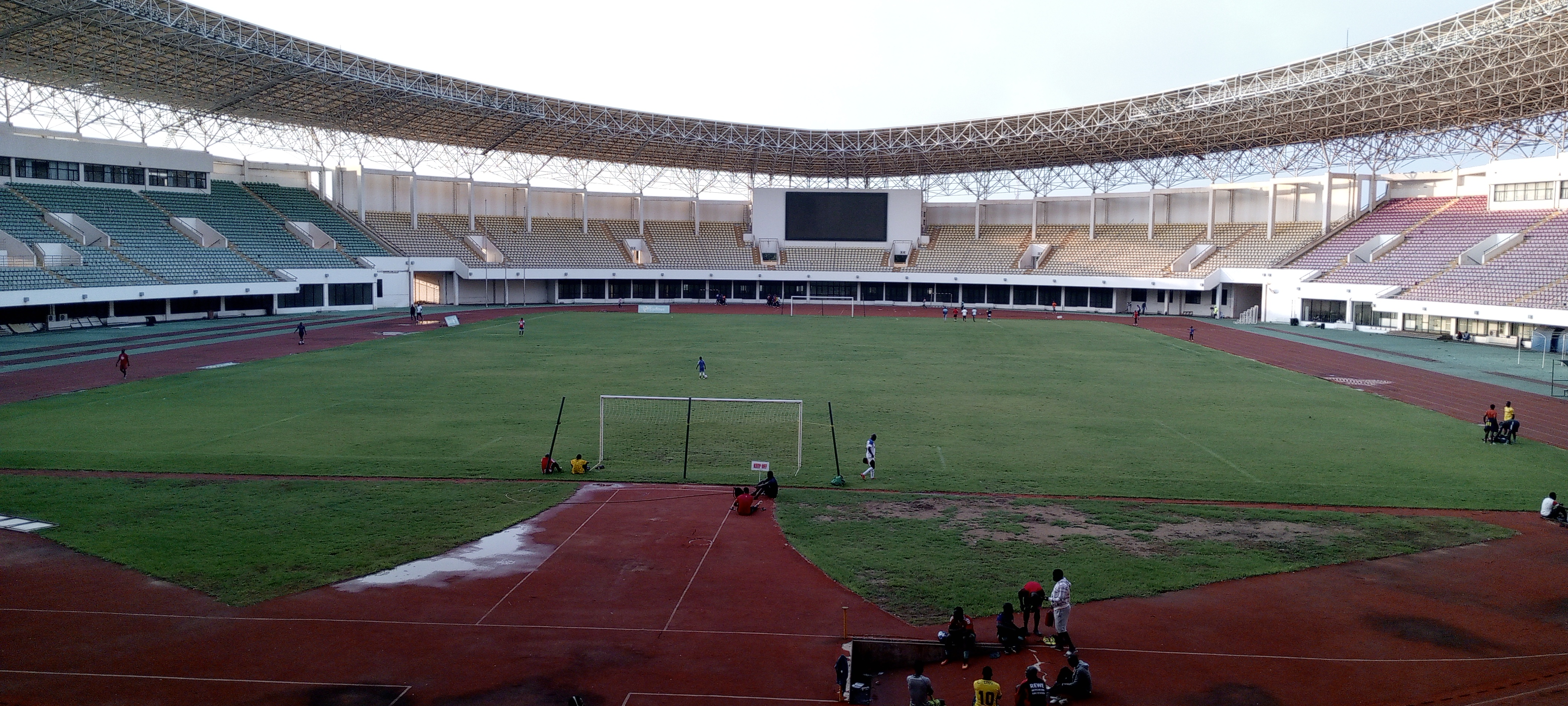
Interior
