= Dreamz Ladies F.C. =

Football club in Ghana

- Full name: Dreamz Ladies Football Club
- Ground: Bantama Astroturf, Bantama
- League: Ghana Women’s Premier League

Dreamz Ladies F.C. is a Ghanaian professional women's football club based in Kumasi in the Ashanti Region of Ghana. The club features in the Ghana Women’s Premier League.

In July-August 2021, Dreamz Ladies finished as champions of the Ashanti Regional Women's Division One League qualifying them for the Regional Women’s Northern Zone championship.

In October 2021, the team gained promotion into the top-flight women's league in Ghana, the Ghana Women's Premier League after finishing as runner-up in the Regional Zonal Championship. In their debut season in the GWPL, they placed third in the Northern Zone.

== Grounds ==
The club plays their home matches at the Bantama Astroturf in Kumasi.
