= Northern Ladies F.C. =

Football club in Ghana

- Full name: Northern Ladies Football Club
- Founded: 2005; 21 years ago
- Ground: Aliu Mahama Sports Stadium, Tamale
- League: Ghana Women’s Premier League

Northern Ladies F.C. is a Ghanaian professional women's football club based in Tamale in the Northern Region of Ghana. The club features in the Ghana Women’s Premier League. The club was formed as the major women's team in the three northern regions.

== Grounds ==
The club plays their home matches at the Aliu Mahama Sports Stadium in Tamale with a capacity of 20.000.

== History ==
In 2005, the club was formed in Tamale, capital of the Northern region of Ghana. The club plays in the Northern Zone of the Ghana Women's Premier League.

== Technical staff ==
Sumani Basirudeen - Headcoach

== Notable players ==
=== A ===
- Mukarama Abdulai ( Northern Ladies F.C. / unknown )
- Doris Akaheeh ( Northern Ladies F.C. / ALG Spor )
- Afi Amenyeku ( Northern Ladies F.C. / FK Apolonia Fier )

=== M ===
- Wasiima Mohammed ( Northern Ladies F.C. / FC Zürich )
