= Ghana Women's Premier League =

Association football league

Ghana Women’s Premier League (GWPL)
- Organising body: Ghana Football Association
- Founded: 2012
- Country: Ghana
- Confederation: CAF
- Number of clubs: 18 (18 from 2021/2022)
- Level on pyramid: 1
- Domestic cup: Ghana Women's FA Cup
- International cup: CAF W-Champions League
- Current champions: Ampem Darkoa Ladies (3 titles) (2022)
- Most championships: Hasaacas Ladies (4 titles)
- Website: Official Website

The Ghana Women’s Premier League (GWPL) is a top division league for women's soccer in Ghana.

== History ==
The league was launched in 2012 as the National Women's League (NWL). Up to 2006, regional areas had active women's soccer leagues. In 2006, a zonal league was created, that played out a national champion for the first time. Ghana was divided into 3 zones that played a league stage. Each zone then advanced 2 teams to a national stage.

A format was played in 2012–13. The league is played in 2 divisions. After the league stage, both division winners meet in a championship final. The first final was won by Hasaacas Ladies 2–1 over Fabulous Ladies at the Accra Sports Stadium. A part of the soccer equipment was sponsored by FIFA.

The 12 teams of the initial season were divided into 2 zones of 6 teams.

Southern Zone
- Cape Coast Ghatel Ladies
- Soccer Intellectuals
- Hasaacas Ladies
- Ayoola Ladies
- Immigration Ladies
- Volta Amalga Ladies
Northern Zone
- Bolga Ghatel
- Reformers
- Lepo Ladies
- Ampem Darkoa Ladies
- Fabulous Ladies
- Ashtown Ladies

In 2021, the Executive Council of the Ghana Football Association decided to expand the League from its format 16 clubs to 18 clubs beginning from the 2021–22 season, meaning 9 teams for the respective zones to allow for a minimum of 16 league matches in a season.

== Format ==
There are 16 clubs in the Women's Premier League, 8 in the southern zone and 8 in the northern zone. During the course of a season (from December to July) each club in each zone plays the others twice (a double round-robin system), once at their home stadium and once at that of their opponents', for 16 games in each zone making it 32 games all together. Teams receive three points for a win and 1 point for a draw. No points are awarded for a loss. Teams are ranked by total points, then goal difference, and then goals scored. If still equal, teams are deemed to occupy the same position. At the end of the zonal league both top placed clubs and zonal winners meet in a championship final to decide the national champion.

=== Promotion and relegation ===
A system of promotion and relegation exists between the Premier League and the Division 1 League. The lowest placed teams in zones of the Premier League are relegated to the Division 1 League, and the top teams from zones in the Championship promoted to the Premier League. The number of clubs was increased from 16 to 18 in 2021–22 season.

== Finals ==
The list of champions and runners-ups:

Season	Champions	Result	Runners-up	Top scorer	Best player	Best goalkeeper	Most promising player
2012–13	Hasaacas Ladies	2–1	Fabulous Ladies	Agnes Aduako Samira Suleiman (14 goals)	Samira Suleman		not awarded
2013–14	Hasaacas Ladies	0–0 a.e.t. (5–3 pen.)	Fabulous Ladies	Agnes Aduako (17 goals)	Janet Egyir	Susan Atsem	not awarded
2014–15	Hasaacas Ladies	1–0	Ampem Darkoa	Samira Suleiman	Janet Egyir	Beatrice Ntiwaa Nketia	Princella Adubea
2015–16	Ampem Darkoa	1–0	Hasaacas Ladies	Princella Adubea (19 goals)	Grace Asantewaa	Evelyn Yeboah	not awarded
2017	Ampem Darkoa	1–0	Lady Strikers	Princella Adubea (16 goals)	Priscilla Okyere	Kerrie McCarthy	not awarded
2018	League abandoned due to the Anas exposé						
2019***	Hasaacas Ladies	3–2	Ampem Darkoa	Pepertual Agyekum (9 goals)	Grace Asantewaa	Evelyn Yeboah	Constance Serwah Agyemang
2019–20	League cancelled due to COVID-19 pandemic						
2020–21	Hasaacas Ladies	4–0	Ampem Darkoa	Ophelia Serwaa Amponsah (17 goals)	Constance Serwah Agyemang	Grace Banwa	Comfort Yeboah
2021–22	Ampem Darkoa	1–1 a.e.t. (5–4 pen.)	Hasaacas Ladies	Princess Owusu (15 goals)	Grace Acheampong	Safiatu Salifu	Stella Nyamekye

2019*** Ghana Women's Special Competition

== Winners by club ==
Clubs	City/ Region	Years	Winners
Hasaacas Ladies	Sekondi-Takoradi, Western Region	2012–13, 2013–14, 2014–15, 2020–21	4
Ampem Darkoa Ladies	Techiman, Bono East Region	2015–16, 2017, 2021–22	3

== Sponsorship ==
Electroland Ghana Ltd, distributors of NASCO electronic appliances, has been a partner and sponsor of the Women's Premier League since 2019–20 season. The company sponsors the Player of the Match award, the monthly awards which includes the Player of the month and Coach of the month awards along with the annual and end of the season awards Player of the season, Top Scorer, Discovery of the year award, Best Goalkeeper and Coach of the season awards.

In October 2020, the Ghana Football Association signed a four-year partnership deal with Decathlon Ghana which includes Decathlon providing 1,000 Kipsta balls and other complementary sports products per year to the league from the 2020–21 season onwards. The deal was extended for another four years in November 2024.

In February 2022, online gambling company Betway signed a sponsorship deal with the Ghana Football Association as a Development Partner of the Ghana Women's Premier League. As a development partner, amongst their roles would be to provide a season-long mentorship and leadership programme for officials, administrators and coaches of the women's soccer clubs. Betway provides training equipment and warm-up kits to all participating clubs in GWPL. The sponsorship was extended in February 2023.

=== Title sponsors ===
Period	Sponsor	Name
2012–2017	No title sponsor	National Women’s League
2018–2019	FreshPak Products	FreshPak National Women’s League
2019–2022	No title sponsor	Ghana Women's Premier League
2022–2026	Guinness Ghana	Malta Guinness Women's Premier League

== Media coverage ==
In February 2020, the Ghana Football Association signed a broadcasting right sponsorship deal with StarTimes Television for 6 years starting from the 2019–20 Ghana Premier League season. As part of the deal StarTimes dedicated $100,000 in the first year as a visibility support to the Ghana Division 1 League and women's soccer especially the Ghana Women's Premier League. They dedicated $50,000 for the following 5 years.

As part of the deal, StarTimes Sports and shareholders Max TV broadcast the 2020–21 Ghana Women's Premier League Final and 2020–21 Ghana Women's FA Cup Final.
