= Araki =

Araki may refer to:

== People ==
- Araki (surname) (荒木)
- Hirohiko Araki (荒木 飛呂彦), a Japanese manga artist, fashion designer and illustrator
- Nobuyoshi Araki (荒木 経惟), a Japanese photographer and contemporary artist also known by the mononym Arākī

== Places ==
- Arakichō 荒木町 a neighborhood in Shinjuku
- Araki Island, an island in Vanuatu
  - Araki language, the language spoken on that island
- Araki Station (Fukuoka)
- Araki Shrine, a Shinto Shrine in Shimane

== Objects ==
- アラキ, a historic Japanese name for the liquor shōchū.
- The Araki, a sushi restaurant in London
- Araki (restaurant) (あら輝), a former sushi restaurant in Tokyo
- alternative spelling for Araqi, a Sudanese liquor
- an Ethiopian liquor; see Ethiopian cuisine

== See also ==
- Arak (disambiguation)
- Araqi (disambiguation)
- Arrakis (disambiguation)
