= Araki (surname) =

Araki is a surname in various cultures.

== Japanese ==
Notable people with the Japanese surname Araki (荒木 or 新木) include:

=== Entertainers ===
- Gregg Araki (born 1959), American movie director
- Hirohiko Araki (荒木 飛呂彦; born 1960), Japanese manga artist
- Hirofumi Araki (荒木 宏文; born 1984), Japanese actor
- Kae Araki (荒木 香恵; born 1963), Japanese voice actress
- Kanao Araki, Japanese manga artist
- Sayaka Araki (荒木 さやか; born 1984), Japanese fashion model and hostess
- Shingo Araki (荒木 伸吾; 1939–2011), Japanese animation artist and character designer
- Tarō Araki (荒木太郎,; born 1961), Japanese film director, screenwriter, and actor
- Tetsurō Araki (荒木 哲郎; born 1976), Japanese animation director
- Yuko Araki (新木 優子; born 1993), Japanese actress

=== Sportspeople ===
- Akane Araki (荒木 茜羽; born 1996), Japanese badminton player
- Daigo Araki (荒木 大吾; born 1994), Japanese footballer
- Daisuke Araki (荒木 大輔; born 1964), Japanese baseball pitcher (Nippon Professional Baseball league)
- Daisuke Araki (荒木 大輔; born 2000), Japanese footballer
- Daizou Araki (荒木 大三; born 1955), Japanese modern pentathlete
- Erika Araki (荒木 絵里香; born 1984), Japanese volleyball player
- Fumiya Araki (荒木 郁也; born 1988), Japanese baseball player (Nippon Professional Baseball league)
- Hayato Araki (荒木 隼人; born 1996), Japanese footballer
- Kenta Araki (荒木 健太; born 1995), Japanese water polo player
- Kumi Araki (荒木 久美; born 1965), Japanese long-distance runner
- Masahiro Araki (荒木 雅博; born 1977), Japanese baseball player (Nippon Professional Baseball league)
- Miharu Araki (荒城 三晴; born 1971), Japanese ice hockey player
- Nana Araki (荒木 菜那; born 2002), Japanese figure skater
- Nobuhiro Araki (荒城 信弘; born 1944), Japanese ice hockey player
- Ryotaro Araki (荒木 遼太郎; born 2002), Japanese footballer
- Sho Araki (荒木 翔; born 1995), Japanese footballer
- Shunta Araki (荒木 駿太; born 1999), Japanese footballer
- Takahiro Araki (荒木 貴裕; born 1987), Japanese baseball player (Nippon Professional Baseball league)
- Toshiaki Araki (荒木 敏明; born 1942), Japanese fencer
- Yugo Araki (荒木 雄豪; 1925–2012), Japanese equestrian

=== Other ===
- Chiharu Araki (荒木 千陽; born 1982), Japanese politician with the Tomin First no Kai party
- Eikichi Araki (1891–1959), Japanese businessman
- Hiroshi Araki (荒木 博志), Japanese astronomer
- Huzihiro Araki (荒木 不二洋; 1932–2022), Japanese mathematical physicist
- Kiyohiro Araki (荒木 清寛; born 1956), Japanese politician with the New Komeito Party
- Araki Mataemon (荒木 又右衛門; 1584–1637), samurai of Japan's early Edo period
- Minol Araki (荒木 實; 1928–2010), Japanese painter and industrial designer
- Araki Murashige (荒木 村重; 1535–1586), retainer of Nobunaga Oda during Japan's Sengoku period
- Nobuyoshi Araki (荒木 経惟; born 1940), Japanese photographer
- Sadao Araki (荒木 貞夫; 1877–1966), Imperial Japanese Army general
- Shoko Araki (荒木 章子), Japanese speech processing engineer
- Takeshi Araki (荒木 武; 1916–1994), Japanese politician, mayor of Hiroshima from 1975 to 1991
- Tetsuo Araki (荒木 哲夫) 1937–1984, Japanese print artist
- Tōichirō Araki (荒木 東一郎; 1895–1977), Japanese writer
- Yoshikuni Araki (荒木芳邦; 1921–1997), Japanese landscape architect
- Yukio Araki (荒木 幸雄; 1928-1945), youngest-known Japanese Kamikaze pilot killed in World War II

== Persian ==
Notable people with the Persian surname Araki (Persian: اراکی) include:

- Mohammad Ali Araki (1894–1994), Iranian religious scholar
- Mohsen Araki (born 1956), Iranian religious scholar
