= Arak =

Arak, Arack or Araq may refer to:

== Places ==
- Arak, Algeria, a village in In Amguel Commune of Tamanrasset Province, Algeria
  - Arak gorges, a series of gorges in Algeria
- Arak, Iran, a city in Markazi Province, Iran
  - Arak County, an administrative subdivision centred on the city
- Araq, Iran, a village in North Khorasan Province, Iran
- Arak, Mengen, a village in Bolu Province, Turkey
- Arak, Republic of Dagestan, a rural locality in Dagestan, Russia
- Arak, Syria, a historic desert town in Syria

== Beverages ==
- Arak (drink), an alcoholic beverage of the Eastern Mediterranean
- Arrack, an alcoholic beverage of South and Southeast Asia

== Other uses ==
- Arak (character), the hero of Arak, Son of Thunder, a comic book published by DC Comics
- Arak University, Arak, Iran
- Arak, a tree or shrub, species Salvadora persica

== See also ==
- Arac (disambiguation)
- Araki (disambiguation)
- Araqi (disambiguation)
- Arrakis (disambiguation)
- Araka
