= Arac =

Arac or ARAC may refer to:

- Araç, a town in Turkey
- Araç (surname)
- Arač, former name of Novi Bečej, a town in Serbia
- Arac (video game), a 1986 video game
- Ara-C, alternative name of Cytarabine, a chemotherapy drug
- AraC, a component of the L-arabinose operon in the genome of the bacterium Escherichia coli
- ARAC, the Army Reserve Aviation Command of the US
- A character in Alfred Lord Tennyson's The Princess (Tennyson poem)
- A character in Gilbert and Sullivan's Princess Ida and Gilbert's earlier The Princess (play), both based on the Tennyson poem.

== People with the name ==
- Jonathan Arac, American literary scholar
- Özlem Araç, Turkish footballer

== See also ==
- Arak (disambiguation)
