= Araqi =

Araqi may refer to:

- Araqi (drink), a date-gin brewed in Sudan
- Araqi, Iran, a village in North Khorasan Province
- Fakhr al-Din Iraqi or Fakhr al-Din Araqi (1213–1289), Sufi writer

== See also ==
- Arax (disambiguation)
- Araki (disambiguation)
- Arrakis (disambiguation)
