= Araç (surname) =

Araç, sometimes spelled Arač, is a surname. Notable people with the surname include:

- Özlem Araç (born 1989), Turkish footballer and manager
- Ege Araç (born 2007), Turkish footballer
- Jonathan Arac (fl. 21st century), American literary scholar
