= Araks (disambiguation) =

Aras River is a river in the Caucasus region.

Araks may refer to:

- Araks, Armavir (east), a village in Araks Municipality, Armavir Province, Armenia
- Araks, Armavir (west), a village in Armavir Municipality, Armavir Province, Armenia
- Arax (weekly), Armenian weekly in Iran
