= Alcohol in Sudan =

Alcohol in Sudan has been broadly illegal since 1983, when the single-party Sudan Socialist Union passed the Liquor Prohibition Bill, making illegal the manufacture, sale, and consumption of any form of alcohol for the Muslim citizens of the country. Alcoholic drinks have been banned since former President Jaafar Nimeiri introduced Islamic law, throwing bottles of whisky into the Nile in the capital Khartoum. On 12 July 2020, Sudan decided to allow non-Muslims to drink alcohol.

== Colonial government ==
During the period of Anglo-Egyptian Sudan (1899-1956), the British colonial government enacted several pieces of legislation limiting alcohol in the country:

- 1899: prohibited import and sale without a license
- 1903: prohibited production and sale of all alcoholic beverages without a license, including traditional brews like marisa (millet beer)
- 1919: prohibited production, sale, or possession of araqi (date gin) or marisa without a license
