= Yorx =

American electronics manufacturer

Yorx Electronics, Inc.
- Formerly: New York Transistor Corporation (until 1967); York Radio Corporation (1967–1974)
- Industry: Consumer electronics
- Founded: c. 1959; 67 years ago in New York, New York, United States
- Founder: Morris J. Feldman
- Defunct: 1994; 32 years ago
- Fate: Acquired by Hagemeyer
- Products: Audio equipment

Yorx Electronics, Inc., was an American consumer electronics manufacturer best known for its low-priced hi-fi audio equipment. Founded as the New York Transistor Corporation in the late 1950s, it began as an importer of transistor radios from Japan before diversifying into other products. It reincorporated as York Radio Corporation in New Jersey in 1967 before trading as Yorx in 1974. It was ultimately acquired by Hagemeyer of the Netherlands in 1994.

== History ==
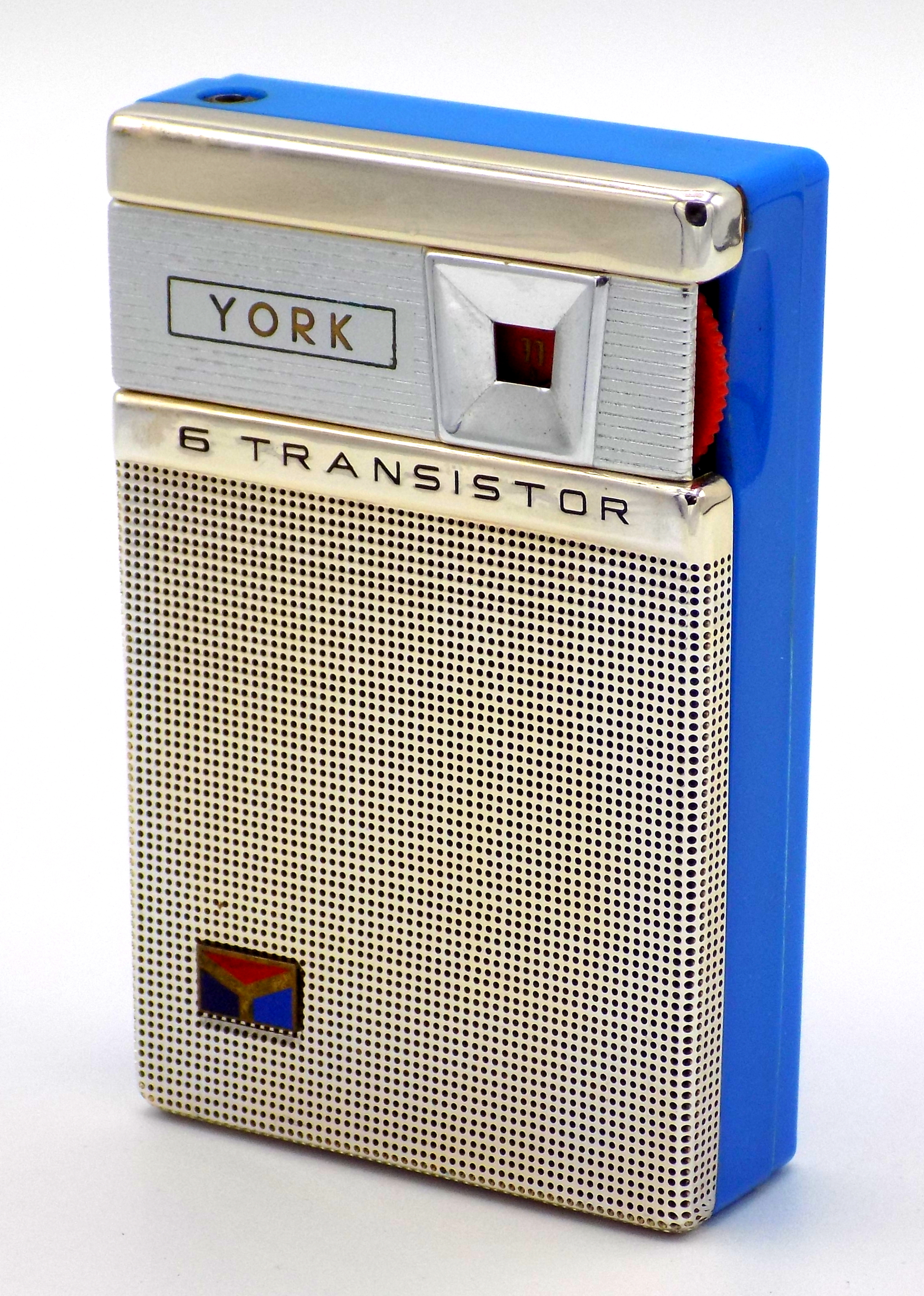
A York-branded transistor radio, from around 1961

Yorx Electronics was founded in the late 1950s as the New York Transistor Corporation in New York City. Its principal founder was Morris J. Feldman, previously of the Hong Kong distribution company Shriro. The company, which was headquartered on 150 Fifth Avenue, was originally incorporated as an importer of transistor radios from Japan. It traded under the brand name York. In 1967, New York Transistor reincorporated itself as the York Radio Corporation and relocated to its new headquarters in South Hackensack, New Jersey, occupying a new 28,000-square-foot facility that was built starting in April that year.

In April 1974, York Radio was acquired by the industrialist Alvin Tanenbaum and renamed Yorx Electronics, Inc. Tanenbaum had previously co-founded the consumer electronics company Lloyd's Electronics in Edison, New Jersey, in the late 1950s, serving as its chairman until 1973. Morse Electro Products of New York had previously put in a bid to acquire York earlier in 1974, before pulling back in favor of purchasing Ross Electronics from Interphoto (also of New York).

Early in his tenure, Tanenbaum spearheaded the design of the Space Saver, a compact stereo system combining a record player, a tape player, and a clock radio. Tanenbaum hired the Japanese painter and industrial designer Minol Araki to render its design. It sold well and was lauded in the press for its striking design, especially that of its control panel which "looked like the cockpit on a 747", according to one journalist. Also under Tanenbaum's tenure, Yorx signed a contract with Emerson Radio to handle the latter's engineering, product design, and procurement of parts.

In August 1977, the Netherlands-based trading company Hagemeyer acquired a controlling interest in Yorx, seeking to expand the company's presence in the audio equipment market by selling both mid-priced and hi-fi products, as well as establishing a line of home video products. Hagemeyer simultaneously opened a number of international subsidiaries for Yorx to distribute the company's products worldwide. In addition, it built a manufacturing facility in Europe in a bid to expand its manufacturing footprint in the Far East. Yorx's partnership with Emerson was terminated as a result of Hagemeyer taking stake in the company. Hagemeyer relocated Yorx's American headquarters to Totowa, New Jersey.

By the early 1980s, Yorx had achieved significant market share in the consumer audio market. This was primarily on the strength of its Araki-designed compact stereo systems. The company's design-led approach proved influential in the industry and gave Yorx's products a high-tech visual style while being engineered to a cost. Following a management shuffle in the late 1980s, however, the company shifted toward more generic designs closely resembling more mainstream offerings from larger manufacturers such as Sony for its products.

In around 1990, Mitsuyoshi "Mitts" Kanbayashi was named president of Yorx. Previously a product manager for the company, Kanbayashi had been employed with Yorx since 1972, starting out as a bench technician. Simultaneously, Lawrence Gordon was hired as Yorx's chairman. By this time, according to the author Brendan I. Koerner, Yorx had become "had become synonymous with so-so quality and affordable prices", a departure from "its glory days in the Carter era". Both Kanbayashi and Gordon sought to return Yorx back to its original design philosophy; Kanbayashi in particular found that Yorx had begun to "look like just another supplier of audio products" by the time he took his post. The investment firm Merrill Lynch, which by this point held majority interest in Yorx, provided Kanbayashi and Gordon the capital necessary to expand Yorx's product lines beyond its core compact stereo line. Kanbayashi, who possessed an engineering background from his time as a circuit designer in Tokyo, pushed Yorx into more niche markets, such as CD changers and karaoke machines based on the CD+G format.

In 1992, Yorx began using CAD software in its design process to create more freeform designs with curved accents, a departure from the boxy aesthetics of its 1970s and 1980s product lineups. Araki was tasked with establishing a uniform design language in an attempt to make Yorx a household name. This period also saw the introduction of new product lines, including boomboxes, clock radios, and hybrid devices such as a handheld electronic game integrated into a personal cassette player and a 4.5-inch black-and-white handheld TV integrated into a personal cassette player. These measures had diminishing returns for Yorx, and by the mid-1990s the company was synonymous with low-end commodity hardware along the lines of Tandy and its house brands.

Freeman Robinson, previously an executive for GTE and Smith Corona, was named chairman and CEO of Yorx in August 1993. In April 1994, Hagemeyer announced its intent to acquire back Yorx in full for an undisclosed sum. Robinson accepted Hagemeyer's bid, and the acquisition was completed the following month. Hagemeyer moved Yorx to St. Louis, Missouri, the following year and began selling budget CD changers and boomboxes. Yorx maintained a low profile for the next decade, culminating in its acquisition by Grand Prix Electronics (GPX; now Digital Products International), a low-end consumer electronics manufacturer that had been spun off from Hagemeyer, in 2004. By 2007, the Yorx trademark was dormant.
