= Filiz Koç =

Turkish-German footballer (born 1986)

Personal information
- Full name: Filiz Heilmann Koç
- Date of birth: 6 October 1986 (age 40)
- Place of birth: Ankara, Turkey
- Height: 1.74 m (5 ft 8 1/2 in)
- Position: Midfielder

Team information
- Current team: 1207 Antalyaspor
- Number: 13

Youth career
- 1997: TSV Havelse
- 1998–2006: Mellendorfer TV

Senior career*
Years	Team	Apps	(Gls)
2006–2009	Mellendorfer TV		
2009–2011	FFC Oldesloe 2000	2	(0)
2011–2012	TSV Havelse	17	(1)
2012–2014	SC Wedemark		
2014–2015	TSV Limmer	20	(0)
2015–2016	1207 Antalyaspor	16	(1)

International career^{‡}
2002	Turkey girls' U-17	3	(0)
2009-2015	Turkey women's	5	(0)
- * Club domestic league appearances and goals as of 26 March 2016 ‡ National team caps and goals as of 21 October 2015

Filiz Koç (born 6 October 1986), a.k.a. Filiz Heilmann or Filiz Heilmann Koç, is a Turkish-German women's footballer who plays as a midfielder in the Turkish Women's First League for 1207 Antalya Muratpaşa Belediye Spor. She is a member of the Turkey women's team. She also has a media career as model, beauty pageant contestant, actress and sideline reporter.

== Early life ==
Filiz Koç was born to a Turkish father and a German mother in Ankara, Turkey on 6 October 1986. Her father, Savaş Koç, played football for the Turkish Süper Lig-team Galatasaray SK between 1986 and 1990.

Her national-footballer father met his later wife during a football match in Munich. The couple married in Turkey, but moved to Germany when Filiz was three years old. where her father continued his football career playing for the Bundesliga team Hannover 96. At age 16, she was naturalized in Germany, holding now dual citizenship.

Filiz Koç completed her education in a private school to become an instructor for sports and fitness.

In her early years, she preferred to be called after her mother's family name "Heilmann" hoping so to have more opportunities. Later on, however, she began using her father's surname "Koç".

== Sports career ==
Inspired by her father's sports profession, Filiz Koç developed a passion for football in her childhood at home. Already at age ten, she decided to become a footballer.

=== Club ===
She began football playing in 1997 at age eleven, entering the German club TSV Havelse based near Hanover. The next season, she moved to Mellendorfer TV, and enjoyed in 2008 her team's promotion to the Group North of 2nd Women's Bundesliga (German: 2. Frauen-Bundesliga Nord). In 2009, she transferred to another 2nd-League-team FFC Oldesloe 2000, where she briefly played. In the 2011–12 season, she rejoined her first team TSV Havelse in the Women's Regional League North (German: Fußball-Regionalliga Nord Frauen). The next season, she resigned from professional football, and was loaned out to SC Wedemark, which competed in the Landesliga (State League) until the team fell apart at the end of the 2014–15 season. She was taken over by TSV Limmer, and played in the Regionalliga one season.

In September 2015, she moved in a loan-out contract to the Turkish club 1207 Antalya Muratpaşa Belediye Spor, which had finished the 2014–15 season in the Turkish Women's Second League as champion, and was so promoted to the Women"s First League. The release approval of her former club TSV Limmer for her to play in Turkey was set to run out at the end of the 2015–16 season, end of March 2016.

At age 20, she suffered a nasal fracture during a futsal game, and had to undergo a corrective surgery later on.

=== International ===
In 2002 at age 16, Filiz Koç was called up to the Turkey girls' under-17 team. She played three games before she had to stay away from the pitch due to a severe muscle injury.

In 2009, she appeared in two matches of the Turkey women's team. She was called up again in 2015, and played in the friendly match against Albania on 19 August 2015. Koç took part at the UEFA Women's Euro 2017 qualifying Group 5 game against Hungary on 21 October the same year.

== Career statistics ==
As of match played 26 March 2016

Club	Season	League			Continental		National		Total	
Club	Season	Division	Apps	Goals	Apps	Goals	Apps	Goals	Apps	Goals
1207 Antalyaspor	2015–16	Women's First	16	1	–	–	2	0	18	1
1207 Antalyaspor	Total		16	1	–	–	2	0	18	1

== In media ==
Filiz Koç acts as a model, and appears in advertisings.

At age 18, she participated at the local beauty pageant "Miss Hannover" upon her mother's request, and placed second.

Representing Turkey, she became runner-up "Miss EM" (EM is the German language abbreviation for European Championship) among 16 contestants ranking after Domenica Huzvarova from the Czech Republic at a beauty pageant held at Europa-Park, Germany on the occasion of the UEFA Euro 2008.

Filiz Koç took part in 2010 at the game show Die perfekte Minute broadcast by Sat.1, and won a money prize of €75,000 by exhibiting her freestyle football art.

In June 2011, Filiz Koç performed the role of "Fadime Gülüc", a murdered fictional German woman footballer of Turkish descent in the episode Im Abseits (In Offside) of police procedural television series Tatort aired by the ARD channel.

She worked as a sideline reporter of Sky Deutschland for the 2. Bundesliga matches beginning with the 2011–12 football season.

Filiz Koç appeared in the German reality shows Die Model WG and Das Model und der Freak aired by the German commercial TV channel ProSieben.
