= Lloyd's Electronics =

US consumer company (1959–1988)

Lloyd's Electronics, Inc.
- Formerly: Lloyd Trade Company (1959–1972)
- Type: Public
- Industry: Consumer electronics
- Founded: May 11, 1959; 67 years ago in Los Angeles, California, United States
- Founder: Abraham Zagha; Alvin Tanenbaum
- Defunct: May 1988; 38 years ago
- Fate: Acquired by Dynascan Corporation
- Products: Audio equipment; Calculators

Lloyd's Electronics, Inc., was an American consumer electronics company best known for its consumer audio equipment and calculators imported from East Asia. Founded as the Lloyd Trade Company in Los Angeles in 1959, Lloyd's moved back and forth from the West Coast to the East Coast for over a decade before settling in Edison, New Jersey in the 1970s. During this period, it was one of the largest consumer electronics brands in the United States. It changed hands from Bacardi to an Oklahoma City–based television manufacturer before ultimately being acquired by Dynascan Corporation of Chicago in 1988.

== History ==
=== Foundation and success (1959–1973) ===
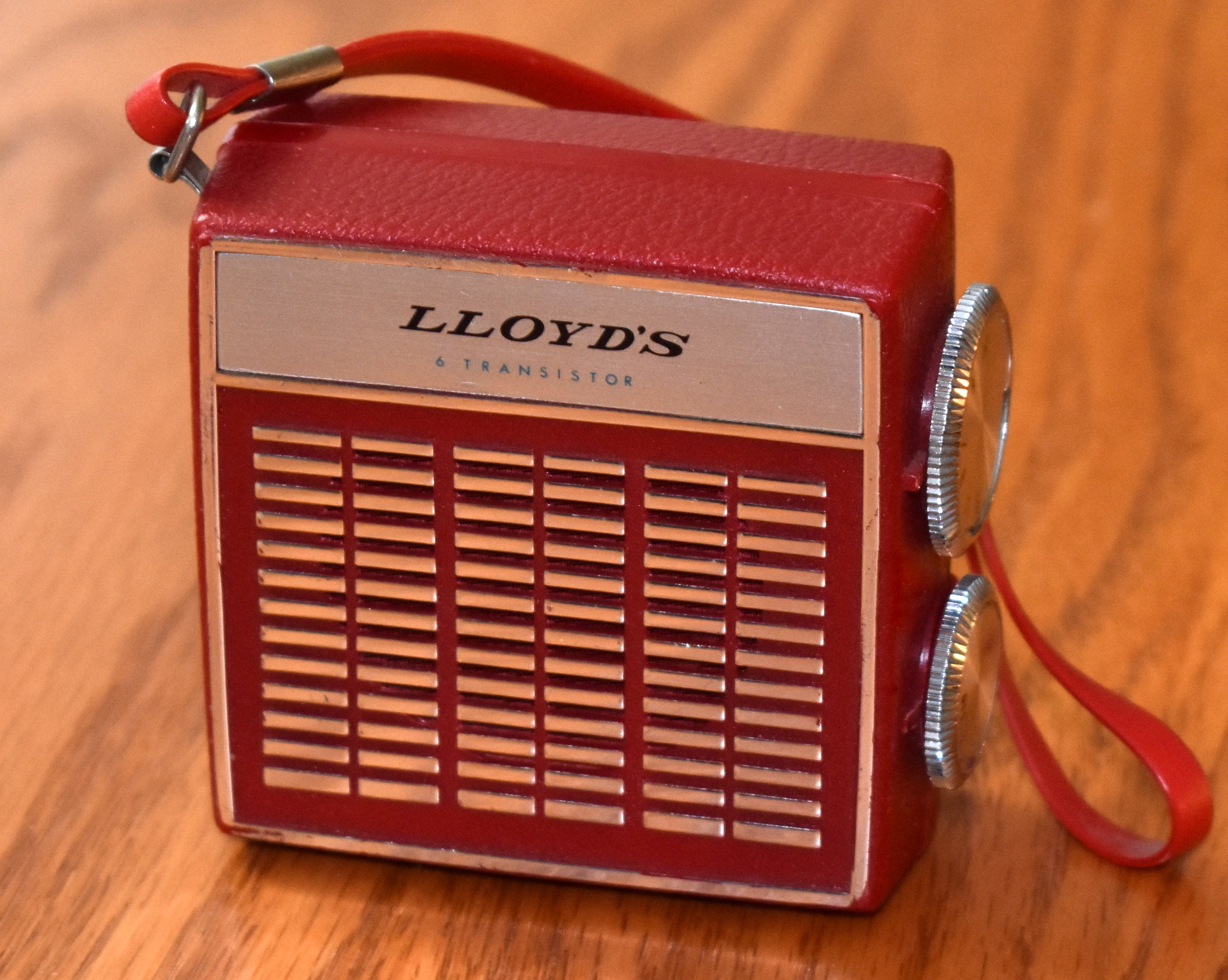
Lloyd's Electronics Model 6K87D AM transistor radio, made in Japan c. 1966

Lloyd's Electronics was founded as the Lloyd Trade Company in Los Angeles, California, on May 11, 1959, by Abraham Zagha and Alvin Tanenbaum (c. 1928 – June 26, 1991). Initially specializing in the import of then cutting-edge audio equipment such as transistor radios, tape recorders, and solid-state amplifiers from East Asia, the firm eventually expanded its product line to include more traditional commodity products such as phonographs, speakers, and headphones. Early in its existence, the company largely imported from Japan and Taiwan. Within a few years of its foundation, Lloyd's became one of the largest importers of consumer electronics in the United States. By 1966, the company had relocated its corporate headquarters to New York City while owning warehouses in Los Angeles and Lodi, New Jersey. In the summer of 1966, Lloyd's raised another large warehouse in Saddle Brook, New Jersey, in anticipation of heavy consumer demand for winter 1966. By the end of the decade, it raised yet another warehouse in nearby Teterboro as well as a satellite office in East Paterson.

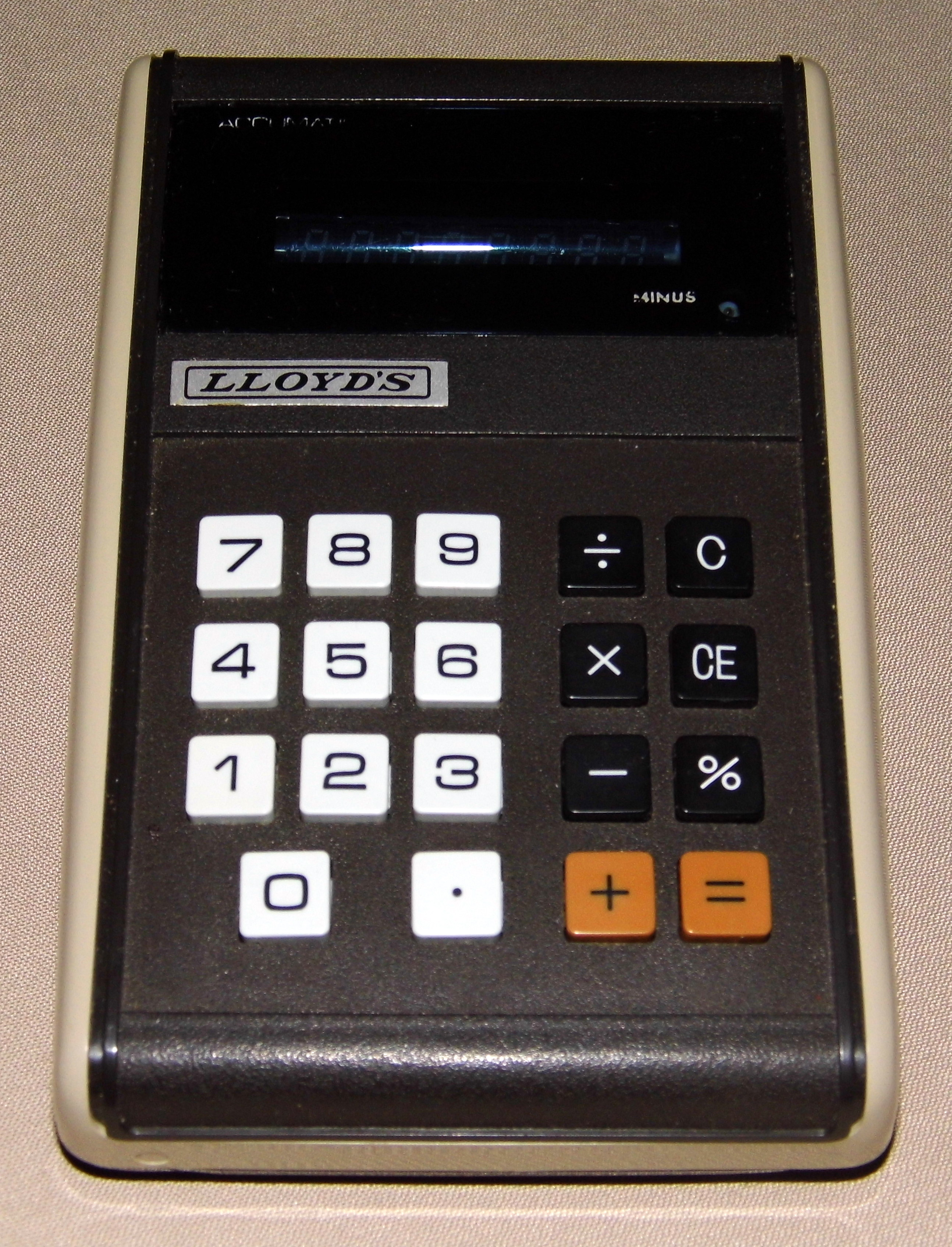
Lloyd's Electronics Model 30 pocket calculator, made in Taiwan

In 1972, the company relocated its headquarters again to Compton, California, and filed its initial public offering on the American Stock Exchange (AMEX). That year it entered the office equipment market with the introduction of a series of desktop calculators and pocket calculators, which featured some of the earliest liquid crystal displays (LCDs) on a calculator. The LCDs were sourced from North American Rockwell, who also manufactured the integrated circuits. Final assembly of Lloyd's calculators meanwhile was performed in Japan and Taiwan.

Lloyd's expanded further in 1973, establishing a sales and service office in Chicago, Illinois, early in the year. It also opened a new East Coast regional office in New York City, out of which Tanenbaum worked, in May that year. Lloyd's briefly operated a manufacturing plant in Toronto this year, before shifting all production back to East Asia within a matter of months.

=== Ouster of co-founder and acquisition by Bacardi (1973–1986) ===
Internal restructuring within Lloyd's in late 1973 led to Tanenbaum being ousted as chairman. In retaliation, Tanenbaum convinced a New York judge to block his removal in early November 1973, before the other board members obtained a restraining order against Tanenbaum the following week. The restraining order was dissolved in December 1973, with New York courts ordering Lloyd's to retain Tanenbaum for the next two months. In early 1974, Tanenbaum left Lloyd's to acquire the York Radio Company (later Yorx), a rival consumer electronics company based in South Hackensack, New Jersey. Zagha, heretofore the president of Lloyd's, assumed the role of chairman in the wake of Tanenbaum's exit.

In fall 1974, Lloyd's moved its corporate headquarters from Compton to the Raritan Center in Edison, New Jersey. Toward the end of the 1970s, Lloyd's encountered financial difficulty, posting four years of losses between 1979 and 1982. It finally regained profitability in 1983, following the dropping of its primary lender Chemical Bank in favor of Meinhard-Commercial and a wave of cost-cutting measures.

In late 1983, Bacardi announced its intent to acquire Lloyd's for approximately US$12 million. Under the proposed terms of the merger, Bacardi offered to purchase all outstanding shares of Lloyd's at $6 per share, a premium over its AMEX share price. The acquisition was structured as a strategic expansion for Bacardi, chiefly known for its distilled beverages, into the United States consumer electronics market. This followed Bacardi's earlier purchase of Willmark Electronics of Puerto Rico, which had an existing procurement relationship with Lloyd's. For Lloyd's, the merger alleviated the company's cash flow problems; in the words of the company's secretary and treasurer, Walter Cruickshank, "Bacardi is an extremely wealthy company. They've got cash and that could help us". In addition, despite having recently returned to profitability, the company remained heavily leveraged. Zagha agreed to grant Bacardi an option to purchase his 22-percent stake in Lloyd's, while Bacardi president Manuel Luis del Valle signaled a commitment to retain management and provide the capital necessary to stabilize Lloyd's core businesses. The acquisition was completed in January 1984.

=== Sale to Texas Hitech, transfer of assets to Dynascan, and decline (1986–2004) ===
Bacardi's acquisition of Lloyd's was initially a boon for the latter, allowing the company to compete with giants in the consumer electronics business such as Emerson Radio, owing to its newfound working capital. Lloyd's failed to reach Bacard's sales expectations, however, with the latter forced to write off $8 million in unsold inventory during their ownership. In February 1986, Bacardi announced that it had expressed interest in selling off Lloyd's to a prospective buyer. In September 1986, Texas Hitech, Inc. (THT), of Oklahoma City, Oklahoma purchased Lloyd's from Bacardi for roughly $20 million. The merged company was subsequently renamed THT Lloyd's, Inc.

Despite THT's earlier profitability and respectable market share in television sets and VCRs, the merged THT Lloyd was fraught with financial difficulties, including a reported two-quarter string of losses of $5.5 million by late 1987. These challenges were exacerbated by a volatile market and a loss of creditors, prompting the company to divest its TV and VCR assets to focus on consumer audio equipment and clock radios. In early 1988, the company also finalized the sale of its Metrosound car stereo division to private investors Jack Rochell and Richard Bertsch.

In January 1988, Dynascan Corporation of Chicago announced its acquisition the trademark and assets of Lloyd's Electronics from THT for just under $3 million. The acquisition was completed in May 1988; it followed a competitive bidding process where Jerry Kalov, the CEO of Dynascan, successfully intercepted a previous letter of intent from Hagemeyer of the Netherlands. The deal was structured so that Peers & Company, a minority stakeholder in Lloyd's, would retain the company's existing liabilities, including lawsuits stemming from the 1985 sale to THT. Industry analysts viewed the merger as a strategic move to position Dynascan as a stronger contender in the American consumer electronics market, effectively doubling its projected annual sales to approximately $250 million. Under the leadership of Kalov, Lloyd's was integrated into a portfolio that included popular audio equipment brands such as Marantz; while Marantz catered to the hi-fi audio market, Lloyd's was positioned as a budget audio brand. Kalov intended to leverage Lloyd's Hong Kong office as an offshore procurement hub for its other divisions while implementing a rapid turnaround strategy similar to its successful revitalization of Marantz.

While initially promsising for Dynascan, Lloyd's and Marantz both ultimately underperformed in the marketplace in 1989, with Lloyd's in particular losing nearly $1.5 million on "paltry" sales of $3 million in fiscal year 1988. Dynascan, later Cobra Electronics, let the rights to the Lloyd's trademark lapse in 2004.
