= 1207 Antalya Spor =

1207 Antalya
- Full name: 1207 Antalya Spor Kadın Futbol Kulübü
- Founded: 2006; 20 years ago
- Ground: Zeytinköy Stadium
- Chairman: Süleyman Türk
- Manager: Ramazan Irmak
- League: Turkish Women's Football Super League
- 2024–25: 3rd

1207 Antalya Spor Kadın Futbol Kulübü, also known as 1207 Antalyaspor, is a women's football team based in Antalya playing in the Turkish Women's First Football League. Current chairman of the club is Süleyman Türk.

== History ==
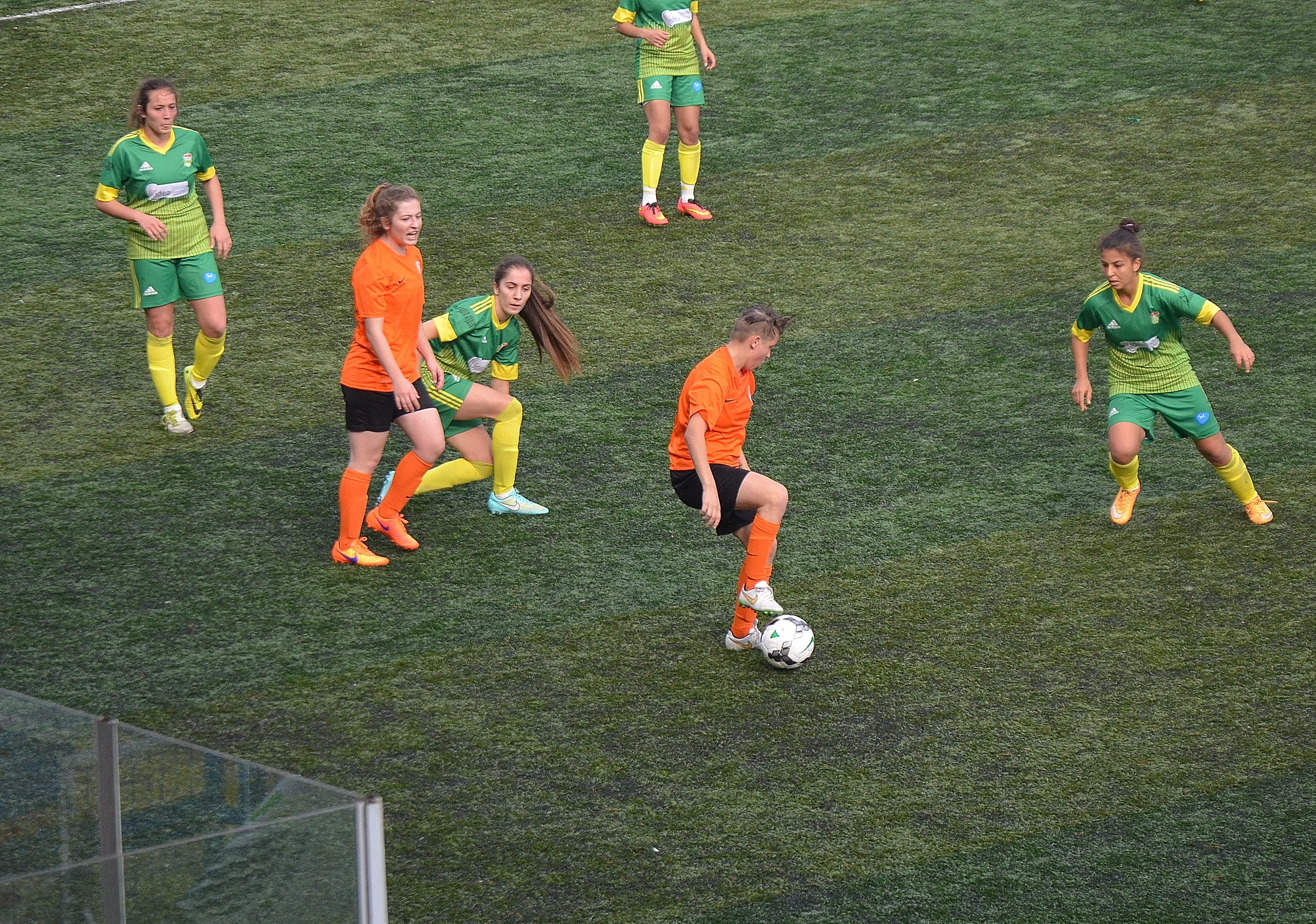
1207 Antalya Muratpaşa Belediye Spor (orange/black) in the away match of the 2015–16 season's against Kireçburnu Spor.

The women's team was founded as Antalya Yeni Kapıspor in 2006, and started to play in the Women's League. From 2007 until 2012, the team was part of Antalyaspor while they played in the 2011–12 season under the name Medical Park Antalyaspor in line with their sponsor. After three seasons in Women's First League, the team was relegated to the Women's Second League for the 2012–13 season. As a result, Antalyaspor's club management decided to close the women's football branch. The team merged with the other women's football club in Antalya, the Döşemealtı Kırkgöz Gençlik Spor and was renamed 1207 Antalya Muratpaşa Belediye Spor. The municipality of Muratpaşa District sponsors the club.

1207 Antalya Muratpaşa Belediye Spor finished the following two seasons as group leader in the Women's Second League, however, lost the play-off matches and failed so to get promoted to the Women's First League. At the end of the 2014–15 season, they became league champion, and were promoted to the Women's First League again in the 2015–16 season. The team played three seasons in the Women's First League, but at the end of the 2017-18 League season, they were relegated to the Women's Second League.

Between 2016 and 2018, the club was sponsored by the district municipality of Döşemealtı in Antalya. The club was renamed to ""1207 Antalya Döşemealtı Belediye Spor". With the 2018–19 season, the name of the club was changed to "1207 Antalyaspor Kadın Futbol Kulübü" ("1207 Antalyaspor Women's Football Club").

After playing two seasons in the Women's Second League, the team were promoted to the Women's First League againaccording to point average by decision of the Turkish Football Federation (TFF) as the season could not be completed due to the outbreak of the COVID-19 pandemic in Turkey.

The team finished the 2023-24 Super League season at 15th place, and was relegated to the First League for the next season.

Team name history

- 2006–2008 Antalya Yeni Kapıspor
- 2008–2010 Antalyaspor
- 2011–2012 Medical Park Antalyaspor
- 2012–2014 1207 Antalyaspor
- 2014–2016 1207 Antalya Muratpaşa Belediye Spor
- 2016–2018 1207 Antalya Döşemealtı Belediye Spor
- 2018–2022 1207 Antalyaspor Kadın Futbol Kulübü
- 2022-2024 Bitexen 1207 Antalya Spor Kadın Futbol Kulübü
- 2024- 1207 Antalya Spor Kadın Futbol Kulübü

== Colors ==
1207 Antalya Spor's colors are orange and blue.

== Stadium ==
The team play their home matches at the Zeytinköy Stadium.

== Statistics ==
As of 8 November 2026.

Season	League	Pos.	Pld	W	D	L	GF	GA	GD	Pts
2006–07	Women's League – Gr. A	6	11	2	1	8	9	31	−22	7
2007–08	Women's League – 1st Stage Gr. E	4	8	2	1	5	6	34	−28	17
2008–09	Second League – Gr. 3	1	8	6	0	2	23	8	+15	18
2009–10	First League	7	18	4	2	12	22	79	−57	14
2010–11	First League	10	21	4	2	15	17	97	−80	14
2011–12	First League – Gr. B	6	11	1	2	8	19	40	−21	5
2012–13	Second League – Gr. 1	1	11	9	0	2	73	6	+67	27
2013–14	Second League – Gr. 2	1	15	13	0	2	113	8	+105	39
2014–15	Second League	1	22	18	3	1	93	20	+70	37
2015–16	First League	4	18	12	2	4	53	12	+41	38
2016–17	First League	4	26	10	5	11	44	36	+8	35
2017–18	First League	9	18	3	1	14	13	37	−124	10
2018–19	Second League	6	28	19	2	7	74	24	+50	56 (Note: 3 penalty points deducted by the decision of the Federation)
2019–20	Second League	3	15	11	1	3	52	7	+45	34 (Note: Promoted after the incomplete season by the decision of the Federation)
2020–21	First League Gr. B	3 (Note: Eliminated for play-offs)	3	0	2	1	2	3	-1	2
2021-22	Super League Gr. A	4 (Note: Finished Gr. A 4th, eliminated in the play-offs QF)	24	15	2	7	51	29	+22	47
2022-23	Super League Gr. B	5	18	7	4	7	32	25	+7	25
2022-23	Play-offs		2	0	0	2	0	7	-7	0
2023-24	Super League	15	30	4	8	18	22	76	-54	20
2023-24	Play-offs		2	0	0	2	0	7	-7	0
2024–25	First League Gr. B	2	14	11	1	2	44	9	+35	34
2024–25	Play-offs	3	6	2	2	2	6	8	-2	25
2025-26	Super League	13	30	7	3	20	30	88	-58	21 (Note: 3 penalty points deducted by the decision of the Federation)
2026-27	Super League	13	10 (Note: Season in progress)	2	3	5	13	26	-13	9
Green marks a season followed by promotion, red a season followed by relegation.

- Legend:

== Current squad ==
As of 8 November 2026.

Head coach: (Turkey) Ramazan Irmak

Note: Flags indicate national team as defined under FIFA eligibility rules; some limited exceptions apply. Players may hold more than one non-FIFA nationality.

No.	Pos.	Nation	Player
1	GK	TUR	Nurcan Yağcı
23	GK	GHA	Olivia Asiamah
2	DF	LBN	Karly Harfouche
14	DF	GHA	Rita Doku
19	DF	SWE	Amanda Lihv
25	DF	TTO	Myla Schneider
5	MF	TUR	Yağmur Gönüllü
8	MF	COD	Francesca Lueya

No.	Pos.	Nation	Player
15	MF	USA	Kiera Laney
17	MF	TAN	Nasma Manduta
22	MF	TUR	Fatma Kılınç
30	MF	JPN	Chinatsu Kaio
61	MF	TUR	Beyza Emine Saruhan
6	FW	TUR	Şefika Öz
13	FW	GHA	Helena Obeng
35	FW	TUR	Sude Koç

== Former notabşe players ==
Algeria

- Ouassila Alouache

Azerbaijan

- Aysun Aliyeva
- Esra Manya

Brazil

- Ana Paula

Republic of the Congo

- Adama Smith Dickens

Ivory Coast

- Fanta Zara Kamaté

Cameroon

- Jacquette Ada

Democratic Republic of the Congo

- Déborah Ngalula

Colombia

- Lady Andrade
- Carolina Arias
- Oriánica Velásquez

Georgia

- Tatiana Matveeva

Ghana

- Gifty Acheampong
- Victoria Agyei
- Regina Antwi
- Ellen Coleman
- Gifty Assifuah
- Sonia Opoku

Nigeria

- Alice Ogebe

Northern Cyprus

- Zehra Borazancı

Puerto Rico

- Karina Socarrás

Turkey

- Serenay Aktaş
- Özlem Araç
- Beyzanur Aslan
- Kübra Berber
- Serra Çağan
- Yaşam Göksu
- Esra Güler}
- Bahar Güvenç

- Fatma Songül Gültekin

- Seda Nur İncik
- Filiz Koç
- Fatma Şahin
- Selin Sivrikaya

Ukraine

- Nadiia Khavanska

== Former managers ==
- (Turkey) Hakan İskender Zıvalıoğlu (2010)
- (Turkey) Necdet Erdoğan (2002–2010, 2011)
- (Turkey) Salih Kamil Kabay (2011)
- (Turkey) Hüseyin Türk (2012–2014)
- (Turkey) Özlem Araç (2014–2017)
- (Turkey) Serhat Ürek (2017–2020)
- (Turkey) Cihat Susever (2021-2022)
- (Turkey) Mevlüt Çırpan (2022-2023)
- (Turkey) Adil Özlü (2023-2024)
- (Turkey) Murat Ülkü (2024-2025)

== Kit history ==
2015–16 home	2015–16 away	2016–17 away	2017–18 away	2021–22 away	2022–23 away

== Squad history ==
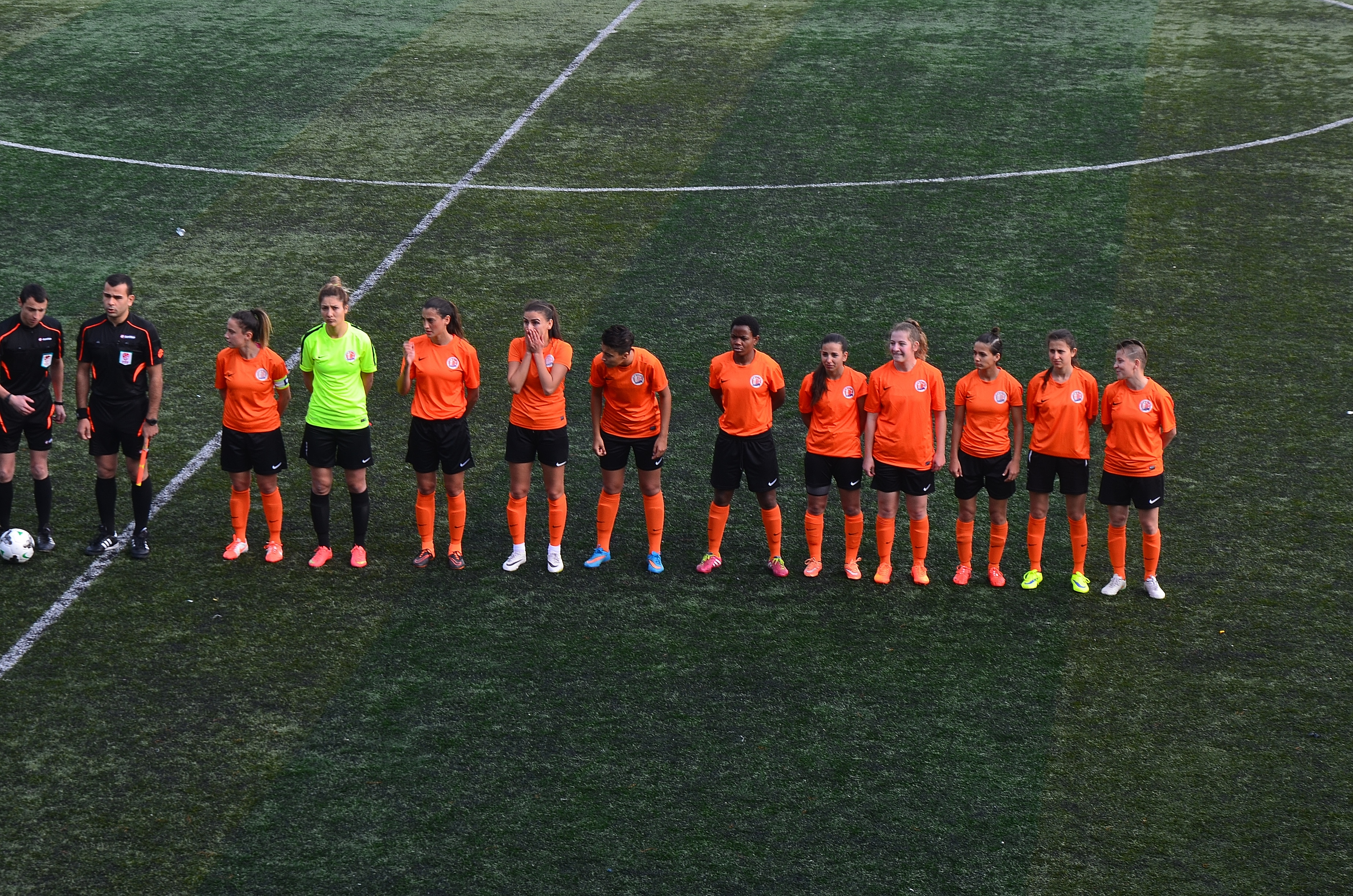
1207 Antalya Muratpaşa Belediyespor team in the 2015–16 season's away match against Kireçburnu Spor.

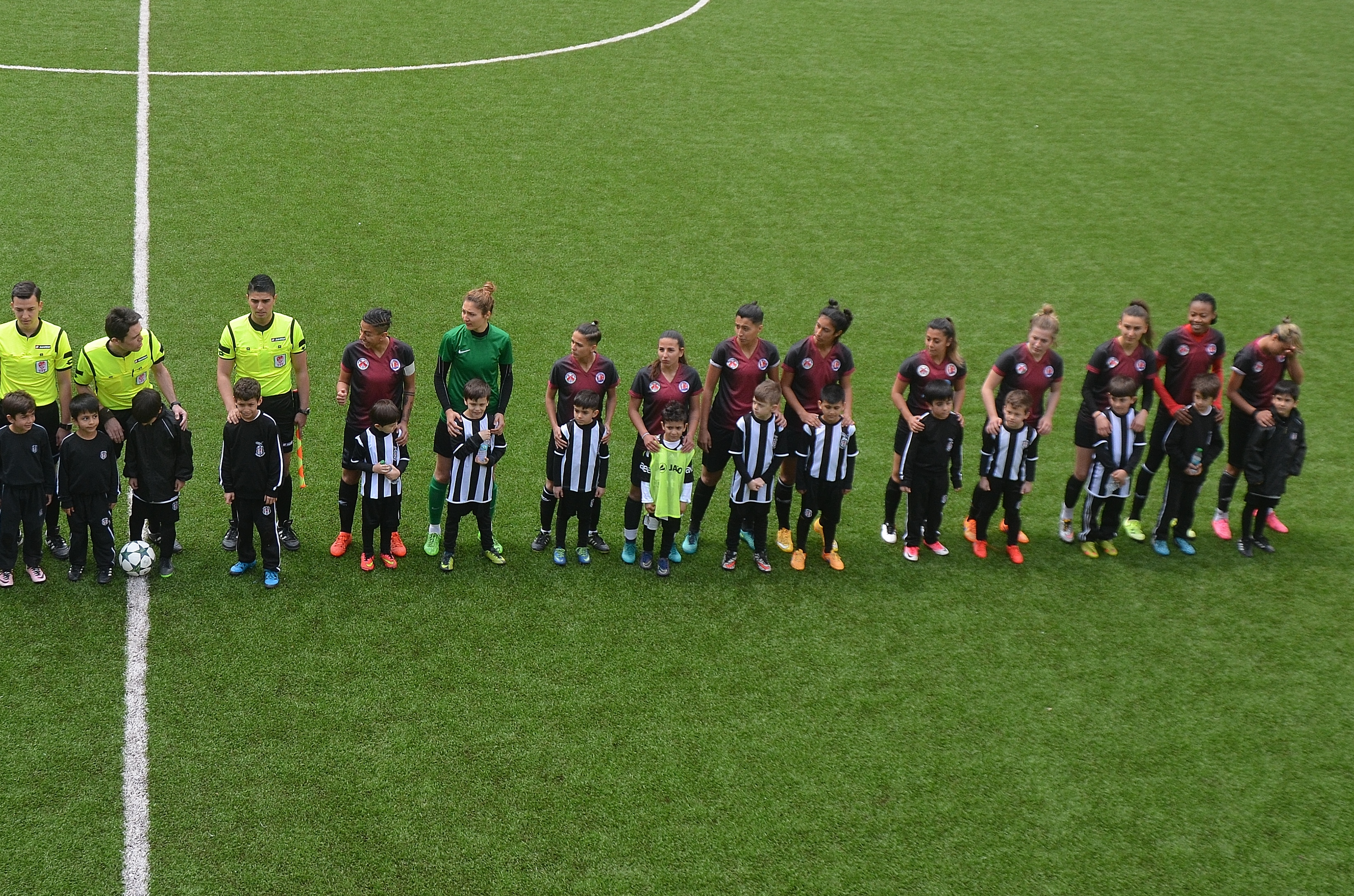
1207 Antalya Döşemealtı Belediyespor team in the 2016–17 season's play-off away match against Beşiktaş J.K.
