= Victoria Agyei =

Ghanaian footballer (born 1996)

Personal information
- Full name: Victoria Antwi-Agyei
- Date of birth: 15 May 1996 (age 30)
- Height: 1.76 m (5 ft 9 in)
- Position: Goalkeeper

Team information
- Current team: AFC Sudbury

Senior career*
Years	Team	Apps	(Gls)
2009–2012	Ashtown Ladies		
2012–2014	Frobuse Ladies		
2014–2016	Ghana Ladies		
2016–2017	ŽFK Obilic		
2017–2018	Sea Lions		
2018–2019	Bnot Netanya	6	(0)
2019–2021	Kumasi Sports Academy Ladies		
2021	Ergotelis	0	(0)
2021–2024	1207 Antalya Spor	46	(0)
2024–	AFC Sudbury		

International career
2013	Ghana U17	6	(0)
2014	Ghana U20	3	(0)
2016	Ghana U17	3	(0)
2021	Ghana	1	(1)
Medal record
Representing Ghana
Ghana women's national under-17 football team
2012 FIFA U-17 Women's World Cup
Runner-up	2012
- * Club domestic league appearances and goals

Victoria Antwi-Agyei (born 15 May 1996) is a Ghanaian footballer who plays as a goalkeeper for AFC Sudbury.

== Club career ==
In August 2021, she sign a year deal with Ergotelis W.F.C and got transferred to 1207 Antalya Spor. Before then, Agyei was in the post for Kumasi Sport Academy Ladies F.C.

== International career ==
Agyei was part of the Ghanaian team at the FIFA 2012 FIFA U-17 Women's World Cup held in Azerbaijan. The team under the leadership of Coach Mas-Ud Dramani won bronze in the tournament. She competed for Ghana Black Princesses in 2014 and 2016 FIFA U-20 Women's World Cup in Canada and Papua New Guinea respectively.

Agyei was invited by coach Mercy Tagoe-Quarcoo to compete for the Ghana Black Queens in the 2021 Aisha Buhari Cup, where she made her only senior appearance for Ghana.

== International goals ==
No.	Date	Venue	Opponent	Score	Result	Competition
1.	20 September 2021	Onikan Stadium, Lagos, Nigeria	Cameroon	2–0	2–0	Aisha Buhari Cup

== Honours ==
- Player of The Match – Canada Vs. Ghana (2014 FIFA U-20 Women's World Cup)
