= Bahar Güvenç =

Turkish footballer (born 1997)

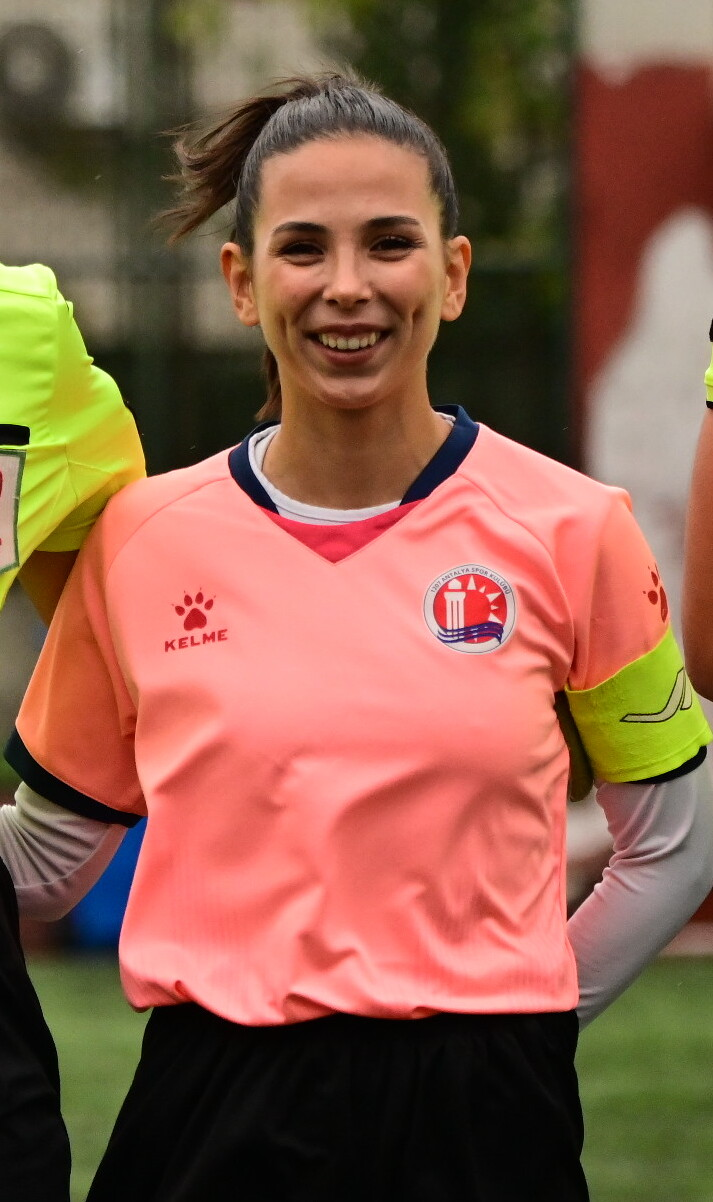
- Bahar Güvenç for 1207 Antalyaspor (November 2023)

Personal information
- Date of birth: 15 January 1997 (age 29)
- Place of birth: Antalya, Turkey
- Position: Defender

Team information
- Current team: 1207 Antalya Spor
- Number: 3

Senior career*
| Years | Team | Apps | (Gls) |
| 2010–2018 | 1207 Antalya Belediyespor | 129 | (13) |
| 2018–2019 | Kdz. Ereğli Belediye Spor | 10 | (0) |
| 2020– | 1207 Antalya Spor | 76 | (3) |

International career^{‡}
| 2012–2014 | Turkey U-17 | 17 | (0) |
| 2013–2015 | Turkey U-19 | 30 | (0) |
| 2016–2017 | Turkey | 6 | (0) |
- * Club domestic league appearances and goals as of 28 September 2025 ‡ National team caps and goals as of 7 March 2017

Bahar Güvenç (born 15 January 1997) is a Turkish women's football defender currently playing in the Super League for 1207 Antalya Sporr with jersey number 3. She was a member of the Turkey girls' U-17 and Turkey women's U-19 teams. Currently, she is part of the Turkey women's team.

Bahar Güvenç is a student of physical education and sports at Akdeniz University.

== Career ==
=== Club ===
Güvenç obtained her license for her hometown club Antalyaspor on March 18, 2010. She began to play in the Turkish Women's First League's 2010–11 season. Two seasons later, her team was relegated to the Second League. She enjoyed her team's promotion to the First League in the 2015–16 season. She captains the team in the 2017–18 season.

In October 2018, she transferred to Kdz. Ereğli Belediye Spor.

She returned to her hometown club 1207 Antalya Spor in the 2020–21 Turkcell Women's Football League season.

=== International ===
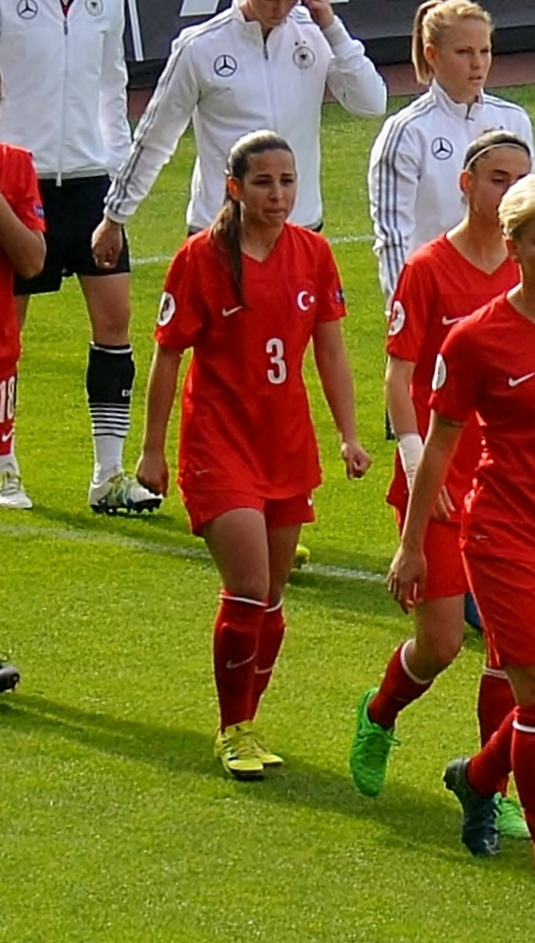
Bahar Güvenç for Turkey women's national team.

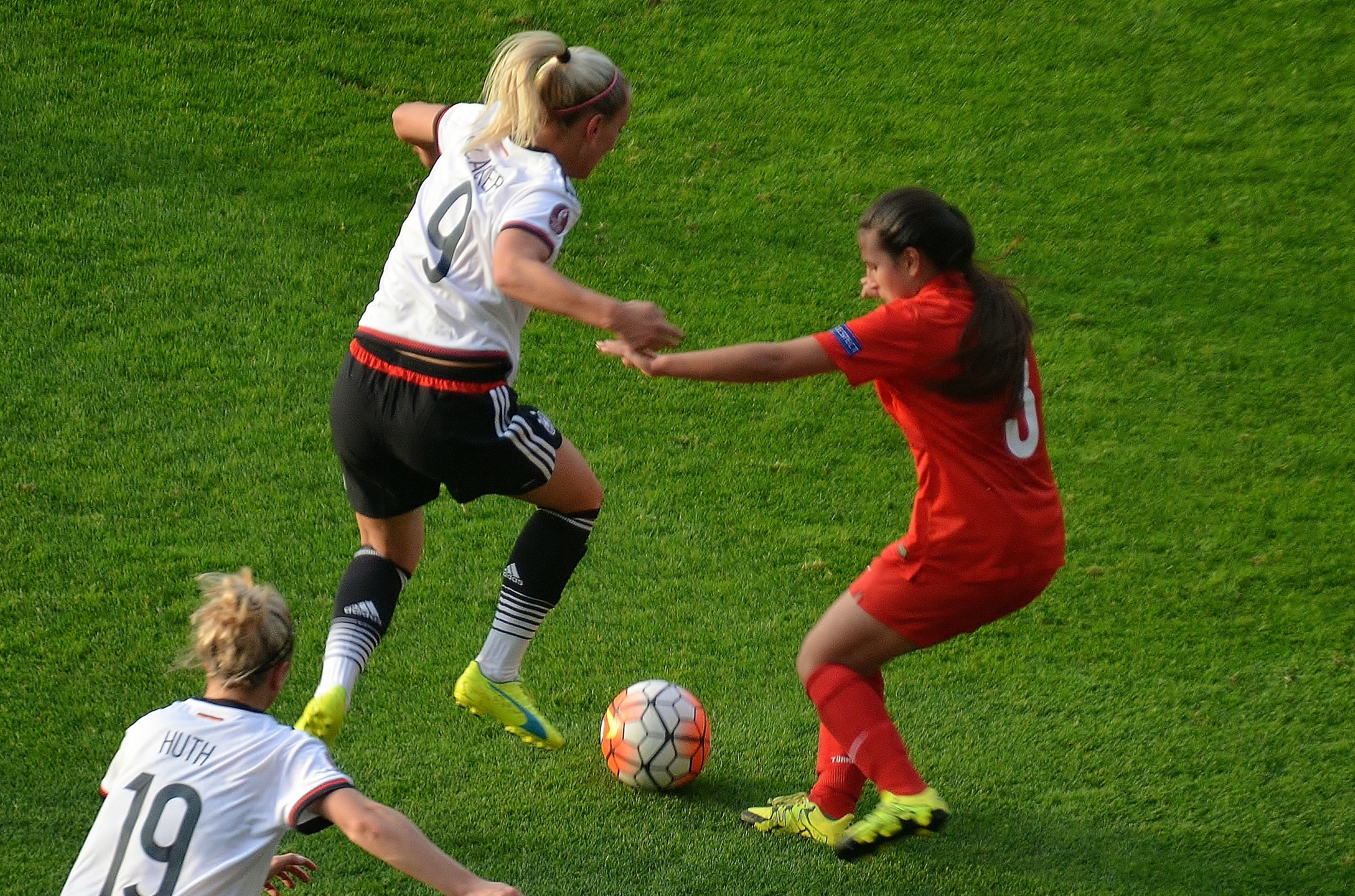
Bahar Güvenç (red) trying to stop a German attack at the UEFA Women's Euro 2017 qualifying Group 5 match in Istanbul, Turkey.

Güvenç was admitted to the Turkey girls U-17 team, and debuted in the UEFA Development Tournament match against Azerbaijan on April 19, 2012. She capped in total 17 times for the Turkey U-17.

On November 26, 2013, she appeared for the first time for the Turkey women's U-19 team in the friendly match against Azerbaijan. She played in 30 matches.

She made her debut for the Turkey women's team in the UEFA Women's Euro 2017 qualifying Group 5 match against Germany on April 8, 2016.

== Career statistics ==
As of 28 September 2025.

| Club | Season | League | | | Continental | | National | | Total | |
| Club | Season | Division | Apps | Goals | Apps | Goals | Apps | Goals | Apps | Goals |
|---|---|---|---|---|---|---|---|---|---|---|
| Medicalpark Antalya Spor | 2010–11 | First League | 18 | 0 | – | – | 0 | 0 | 18 | 0 |
| Medicalpark Antalya Spor | 2011–12 | First League | 19 | 1 | – | – | 2 | 0 | 21 | 1 |
| 1207 Antalya Spor | 2012–13 | Second League | 9 | 2 | – | – | 9 | 0 | 18 | 2 |
| 1207 Antalya Spor | 2013–14 | Second League | 9 | 4 | – | – | 17 | 0 | 26 | 4 |
| 1207 Antalya Muratpaşa BS | 2014–15 | Second League | 21 | 5 | – | – | 14 | 0 | 35 | 5 |
| 1207 Antalya Muratpaşa BS | 2015–16 | First League | 15 | 0 | – | – | 8 | 0 | 23 | 0 |
| 1207 Antalya Döşemealtı BS | 2016–17 | First League | 21 | 0 | – | – | 3 | 0 | 24 | 0 |
| 1207 Antalya Döşemealtı BS | 2017–18 | First League | 17 | 1 | – | – | 0 | 0 | 17 | 1 |
| 1207 Antalya Döşemealtı BS | Total | | 129 | 13 | – | – | 53 | 0 | 182 | 13 |
| Kdz. Ereğli Belediye Spor | 2018–19 | First League | 10 | 0 | – | – | 0 | 0 | 10 | 0 |
| 1207 Antalya Spor | 2020–21 | First League | 3 | 1 | – | – | 0 | 0 | 3 | 1 |
| 1207 Antalya Spor | 2021–22 | Super League | 23 | 0 | – | – | 0 | 0 | 23 | 0 |
| 1207 Antalya Spor | 2022–23 | Super League | 10 | 1 | – | – | 0 | 0 | 10 | 1 |
| 1207 Antalya Spor | 2023–24 | Super League | 29 | 0 | – | – | 0 | 0 | 29 | 0 |
| 1207 Antalya Spor | 2024–25 | First League | 11 | 1 | – | – | 0 | 0 | 11 | 1 |
| 1207 Antalya Spor | 2025–26 | Super League | 0 | 0 | – | – | 0 | 0 | 0 | 0 |
| 1207 Antalya Spor | Total | | 76 | 3 | – | – | 0 | 0 | 76 | 3 |
| Career total | | | 215 | 16 | – | – | 53 | 0 | 268 | 16 |

== Honours ==
Turkish Women's First League

1207 Antalyaspor
Third places (1): 2024–25

Turkish Women's Second League

1207 Antalyaspor
Winners (1): 2014–15
