= Chang Dai-chien =

Chinese artist and forger

Chang Dai-chien Zhang Daqian
- 張大千
- Born: Zhāng Zhèngquán (張正權); 10 May 1899; Neijiang, Sichuan, China
- Died: 2 April 1983 (aged 83); Taipei, Taiwan
- Known for: Painting
- Movement: guohua, impressionism, expressionism
- Spouse(s): Xie Shunhua (謝舜華), Huang Ningsu (黃凝素), Zheng Qingrong (曾慶蓉), Yang Wanjun (楊婉君), Xu Wenbo (徐雯波)

Chinese name
- Traditional Chinese: 張大千
- Simplified Chinese: 张大千
Transcriptions
Standard Mandarin
- Hanyu Pinyin: Zhāng Dàqiān
- Wade–Giles: Chang Ta-ch'ien
- IPA: [ʈʂáŋ tâ.tɕʰjɛ́n]

Chang Dai-chien
- Children: Zhang Xinrui (eldest daughter) (長女張心瑞)、 Zhang Xincheng (son) (子張心澄)、Zhang Xinsheng (youngest daughter)(么女張心聲)

Chang Dai-chien or Zhang Daqian (Chinese: 張大千; Wade–Giles: Chang Ta-ch'ien; 10 May 1899 – 2 April 1983) was one of the best-known and most prodigious Chinese artists of the twentieth century. Originally known as a guohua (traditionalist) painter, by the 1960s he was also renowned as a modern impressionist and expressionist painter. In addition, he is regarded as one of the most gifted master forgers of the twentieth century.

== Background ==
Chang was born in 1899 in Sichuan Province to a financially struggling but artistic family, whose members had converted to Roman Catholicism. His first commission came at age 12, when a traveling fortune-teller requested he paint her a new set of divining cards. At age 17 he was captured by bandits while returning home from boarding school in Chongqing. When the bandit chief ordered him to write a letter home demanding a ransom, he was so impressed by the boy's brushmanship that he made the boy his personal secretary. During the more than three months that he was held captive, he read books of poetry which the bandits had looted from raided homes.

In 1917, Chang moved to Kyoto to learn textile dyeing techniques. He later returned to Shanghai in 1919 and established a successful career selling his paintings.

The governor of Qinghai, Ma Bufang, sent Chang to Sku'bum to seek helpers for analyzing and copying Dunhuang's Buddhist art.

Due to the political climate of China in 1949, he left the country and then moved to Mendoza, Argentina in 1952. Two years later, he resided in São Paulo, Brazil.

In the 1967 Chang settled in Carmel-by-the-Sea, California. During their stay, he and his wife lodged at the Dolores Lodge, owned by Thomas Chew and currently known as the Carmel Country Inn, situated at the intersection of Dolores Street and 3rd Avenue. They stayed in a distinctive cabin that had a set of connected rooms. By 1968, they had relocated to their personal residence, which the artist dubbed 'K'e-yi Chu' - meaning "barely habitable" or "just okay" when translated. Their home was situated on the western side of Crespi Avenue, precisely six houses south of Mountain View Avenue.

They toured extensively around Northern California. Chang's first California solo exhibition in 1967 at Stanford University attracted an opening reception crowd of a thousand. Finally he settled in Taipei, Taiwan in 1978. During his years of wandering he had several wives simultaneously, curried favor with influential people, and maintained a large entourage of relatives and supporters. He also kept a pet gibbon. He affected the long robe and long beard of a scholar.

A meeting between Chang and Picasso in Nice, France in 1956 was viewed as a summit between the preeminent masters of Eastern and Western art. The two men exchanged paintings at this meeting.

== Artistic career ==
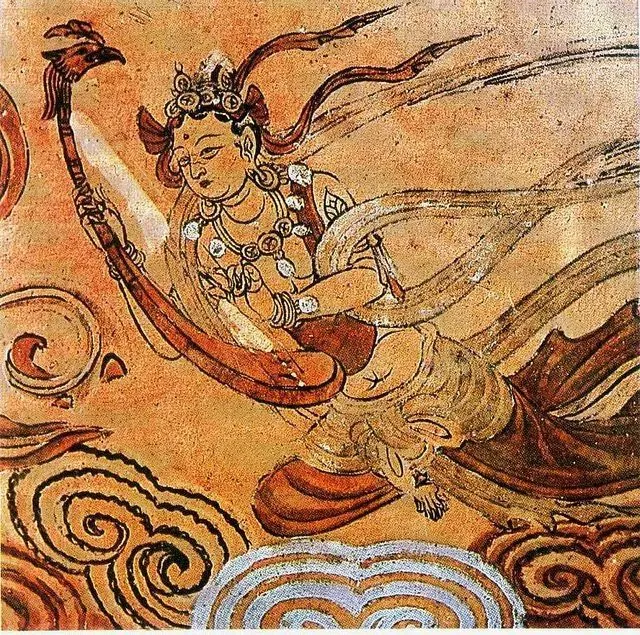
Painting in Mogao Cave 327, dated to the Western Xia (1036-1226 A.D.), of which Chang would paint a replica. That painting was titled "中的飞天" Flying Sky or Flying Feintian.

In the early 1920s, Chang started pursuing professional studies in Shanghai, where he studied with two famous artists, Zeng Xi and Li Ruiqing. His elder brother Zhang Shanzi, who was a famous painter at the time, brought him to a literary salon in 1924 where his first appearance impressed the attendants. His first exhibition of 100 paintings was in 1925 at Ningbo Association in Shanghai.

In the late 1920s and 1930s, Chang moved to Beijing where he befriended other famous artists, including Yu Feian, Wang Shensheng, Ye Qianyu, Chen Banding, Qi Baishi, and Pu Xinyu. Chang had collaborated with Pu on painting and calligraphy. At the time, there was an idiom "Chang from the south, Pu from the north (南張北溥)" for those two of the most renowned artists in China. There was also a saying that Chang was "southern counterpart of Pu Xinyu in shan-shui painting, Qi Baishi in flower-and-bird painting, and Xu Cao in figure painting".

In the 1930s he worked out of a studio on the grounds of the Master of the Nets Garden in Suzhou. In 1933, while an exhibition of modern Chinese paintings organized by Xu Beihong was held in Paris, France, and Zhang's exhibited painting "Golden Lotus (金荷)" was purchased by the French government. In 1935, he accepted the invitation from Xu Beihong to be a professor at National Central University Art Department in Nanjing. In the same year, his portfolio was published in Shanghai. In 1936, his personal exhibition was held in the United Kingdom.

In the early 1940s, Chang led a group of artists in copying the Buddhist wall paintings in the Mogao and Yulin caves. In order to copy the inner layer of the multilayered murals in the Mogao Caves, Chang removed and damaged several outer layers of the paintings in Cave 108, 130 and 454. In 1943, he exhibited his copies of murals and supported the establishment of the Dunhuang Art Institute, the predecessor of the Dunhuang Research Academy. In 1945, Chang's works, as a part of a UNESCO's touring contemporary art exhibition, were shown in Paris, London, Prague and Geneva.

In the late 1950s, his deteriorating eyesight led him to develop his splashed color, or pocai, style, which combines abstract expressionism with traditional Chinese styles of painting. In the 1970s, he mentored painter Minol Araki.

In 1957, Zhang Daqian was invited to hold exhibitions in The Louvre and Musée Guimet in Paris, where Picasso was also holding a show. Zhang seized this opportunity to meet with him. Picasso was delighted to meet Zhang and even asked him to criticise his Chinese paintings. Zhang directly told Picasso that he did not have the right brushes to do Chinese art. Ten years later, Picasso received a gift from Zhang– two Chinese writing brushes made from the hair of 2500 three-year-old cows.

== Forgeries ==
Chang's forgeries are difficult to detect for many reasons. First, his ability to mimic the great Chinese masters:

So prodigious was his virtuosity within the medium of Chinese ink and colour that it seemed he could paint anything. His output spanned a huge range, from archaising works based on the early masters of Chinese painting to the innovations of his late works which connect with the language of Western abstract art.

Second, he paid scrupulous attention to the materials he used. "He studied paper, ink, brushes, pigments, seals, seal paste, and scroll mountings in exacting detail. When he wrote an inscription on a painting, he sometimes included a postscript describing the type of paper, the age and the origin of the ink, or the provenance of the pigments he had used."

Third, he often forged paintings based on descriptions in catalogues of lost paintings; his forgeries came with ready-made provenance.

Chang's forgeries have been purchased as original paintings by several major art museums in the United States, including the Museum of Fine Arts, Boston:

Of particular interest is a master forgery acquired by the Museum in 1957 as an authentic work of the tenth century. The painting, which was allegedly a landscape by the Five Dynasties period master Guan Tong, is one of Chang’s most ambitious forgeries and serves to illustrate both his skill and his audacity.

It can be hard to attribute works to Chang since his style was so varied. Not only did he create his own work as well as forging other artists, but others would forge his originals.

Additionally, in China, "forgery" does not hold the same nefarious connotation as it does in Western culture. What would be considered illegal forgery in the United States is not necessarily as criminal in China. Actions he took to fall under the Western definition of forgery include aging work with electric hairdryers, and creating fake provenance with his collection of seals that he could use to mark past "owners" of the work. To further this provenance, his friend Puru, a cousin of Puyi and member of the former imperial family, would provide a colophon authenticating the work's imperial origins.

Art historian James Cahill claimed that the painting The Riverbank, a masterpiece from the Southern Tang dynasty, held by the New York Metropolitan Museum of Art, was likely another Chang forgery. The silk the piece is painted on could be carbon dated to help authenticate it, however since there has been some restoration on it—the border repaired and the painting remounted and reglued—not only would getting a sample to test be difficult, but there would be no guarantee the sample only contains original material.

Museum curators are cautioned to examine Chinese paintings of questionable origins, especially those from the bird and flower genre with the query, "Could this be by Chang Dai-chien?" Joseph Chang, Curator of Chinese Art at the Sackler Museum, suggested that many notable collections of Chinese art contained forgeries by the master painter.

It is estimated that Chang made more than 10 million dollars selling his forgeries.

== Notable works ==
- 1932 "Meditating at Lakeside"
- 1941 "Flying Deity"
- 1944 "Lady Red Whisk" (《紅拂女》)
- 1944 "Reproduction of Dunhuang Fresco-Mahasattva"
- 1944 "Tibetan Women with Dogs" (《番女掣厖图》)
- 1947 "Living in the Mountains on a Summer Day after Wang Meng"
- 1947 "Lotus and Mandarin Ducks"
- 1947 "Sound of the Flute on the River"
- 1948 "Children Playing under a Pomegranate Tree"
- 1949 "Dwelling in the Qingbian"
- 1949 "Refreshments beneath a Pine"
- 1950 "Indian Dancer"
- 1953 "Ancient Beauty"
- 《金箋峨嵋記青山中花》(pocai Shan Shui)
- 1960 "Lotus "
- 1962 "Panorama of Blue Mountains"
- 1962 "Strange Pines of Mount Huang"
- 1964 "The Poet Li Bai"
- 1965 "Cottages in Misty Mountains"
- 1965 "First Light in the Gorges in Autumn"
- 1965 "Snowy Mountain"
- 1965 "Splashed-color" landscape
- 1965 "Spring Clouds on Country River"
- 1966 "Spring Mist"
- 1966 "Woman with Screen Painted with Lotus Blossom"
- 1967 "Rain and Fog"
- 1967 "Waterfall on a Mountain in Spring"
- 1968 “Mist at Dawn” 《春雲曉靄》
- 1968 "Aafchen See" (《愛痕湖》)
- 1968 "Morning Mist"
- 1968 "Poetic Landscape"
- 1968 "Swiss Peaks"
- 1968 "The Great Yangtze River" (《長江萬里圖》)
- 1968 "The Lake of the Five Pavilions"
- 1968 "Tormented Landscape"
- 1969 "Manchurian Mountains"
- 1970 "Secluded Valley "
- 1970 "Vast Landscape with Waterfalls and Pines"
- 1971《可以橫絕峨嵋巔》(pocai Shan Shui)
- 1972 " Lakeshore"
- "Scenery by the Lake"《湖畔風景》(pocai Shan Shui)：張大千於1972年74歲時，於美國加州十七哩海岸(17 Mile Drive)小半島所繪之公園湖畔風景潑彩山水圖(住居環蓽盦附近)
- 1973 "Sailing in the Wu Gorges"
- 1973《青城天下幽》潑彩山水圖
- 1974 "Night Strolling in Xitou"
- 1978《長江江靜瀨船秋水釣魚》(pocai Shan Shui)
- 1979《闊浦遙山系列》潑彩山水圖、《摩耶精舍外雙溪》(pocai Shan Shui)、巨幅金箋《金碧潑彩紅荷花圖》
- 1980 "Clouds at Mount Ali"
- 1981《台北外雙溪摩耶精舍》(pocai Shan Shui)
- 1981 "Blue and Green Landscape"
- 1981 "Majestic Waterfall"
- 1982 “Peach Blossom Spring” 《桃源圖》
- 1982《人家在仙堂》潑彩山水圖、《春雲曉靄》(pocai Shan Shui)、大風堂作潑彩山水圖、《水殿幽香荷花圖》、《水墨紅荷圖》等作品。
- 1983《廬山圖》(pocai Shan Shui)

== See also ==
- National Palace Museum
- Yu Youren

== Bibliography ==
- Shen, Fu. Challenging the past: the paintings of Chang Dai-chien. Washington, D.C.: Arthur M. Sackler Gallery, Smithsonian Institution; Seattle: University of Washington Press, c. 1991. (OCLC 23765860)
- Chen, Jiazi. Chang Dai-Chien: the enigmatic genius. Singapore : Asian Civilisations Museum, ©2001. (OCLC 48501375)
- Yang, Liu. Lion among painters: Chinese master Chang Dai Chien. Sydney, Australia: Art Gallery of New South Wales, ©1998. (OCLC 39837498)
