= Kiera Laney =

American soccer player (born 2003)

Personal information
- Full name: Kiera Riley Laney
- Date of birth: November 7, 2003 (age 23)
- Place of birth: Edina, Minnesota, United States
- Height: 5 ft 6 in (1.68 m)
- Position: Midfielder

Team information
- Current team: 1207 Antalya
- Number: 15

Youth career
- 2018–2022: Eagles

College career
Years	Team	Apps	(Gls)
2022–2025	Minnesota State Mavericks	90	(3)

Senior career*
Years	Team	Apps	(Gls)
2026	Sioux Falls City		
2026–	1207 Antalya	10	(2)
- * Club domestic league appearances and goals as of November 8, 2026

Kiera Riley Laney (born November 7, 2003) is an American professional soccer player who plays as a midfielder for Turkish Super League club 1207 Antalya.

== Club career ==
Laney played for Eagles of the Totino-Grace High School in the Northwest Suburban Conference, captaining the team. She practised hockey and lacrosse in addition to soccer four years long from 2018 on during her high school education.

She played in the Minnesota State Mavericks women's soccer team and appeared in a total of 90 games scoring three goals between 2022 and 2025 during her university education.

After graduation from the university, she entered Sioux Falls City FC to play in the 2026 USL W League season.

She moved to Turkey in August 2026, and signed with the Women's Super League club 1207 Antalya.

== Personal life ==
Laney was born to Michael and Michele Laney in Edina, Minnesota, United States on November 7, 2003. She has a sister Shealyn. She is a resident of Maple Grove, Minnesota.

She attended Totino-Grace High School in Fridley, Minnesota for two tearms, and shifted to Osseo Senior High School for the final two terms. She studied Finance and Business Law at Minnesota State University, Mankato between 2022 and 2025.
