= Adama Smith Dickens =

Congolese footballer

Personal information
- Date of birth: 28 December 1992 (age 33)
- Place of birth: Congo
- Position: Midfielder

Senior career*
Years	Team	Apps	(Gls)
2015	AC Léopards		
2015	Trabzon İdmanocağı	1	(0)
2016	1207 Antalyaspor	5	(0)

International career
- Congo
- * Club domestic league appearances and goals as of 28 December 2016

Adama Smith Dickens (born 28 December 1992) is a Congolese footballer who plays as a midfielder. She played for 1207 Antalya Muratpaşa Belediye Spor in the Turkish Women's First Football League with jersey number 24. She is a member of the Congo women's national football team.

== Career ==
=== Club ===
Smith Dickens played in her country for the women's team of the Dolisie-based club AC Léopards.

In 2015, she played a brief time for the Turkish team Trabzon İdmanocağı.

Smith Dickens was transferred by 1207 Antalya Muratpaşa Belediye Spor in January 2016 to play in the second half of the 2015–16 Turkish Women's First Football League.

=== International ===
She was admitted to the Congo women's national football team and took part at the women's tournament of the 2015 African Games held in Brazzaville, Republic of the Congo.

== Career statistics ==
As of match played 28 February 2016.

Club	Season	League			Continental		National		Total	
Club	Season	Division	Apps	Goals	Apps	Goals	Apps	Goals	Apps	Goals
Trabzon İdmanocağı	2014–15	First League	1	0	–	–			1	0
Trabzon İdmanocağı	Total		1	0	–	–			1	0
1207 Antalyaspor	2015–16	First League	5	0	–	–			5	0
1207 Antalyaspor	Total		5	0	–	–			5	0
