= Karly Harfouche =

Lebanese footballer (born 2004)

- Harfouche with Lebanon in 2025

Personal information
- Full name: Karly Carlos Harfouche
- Date of birth: 3 August 2004 (age 22)
- Place of birth: Baabda, Lebanon
- Height: 1.68 m (5 ft 6 in)
- Position: Centre-back

Team information
- Current team: 1207 Antalya Spor
- Number: 2

College career
Years	Team	Apps	(Gls)
2022–2025	Bethel Pilots	73	(2)

Senior career*
Years	Team	Apps	(Gls)
2021–2024	SAS	32	(5)
2025–2026	No Limits	4	(0)
2026–	1207 Antalya Spor	5	(0)

International career^{‡}
2023	Lebanon U20	3	(0)
2023–	Lebanon	9	(0)
Medal record
Women's football
Representing Lebanon
WAFF U-18 Girls Championship
Gold medal – first place	2019	U-18 Team
WAFF U-15 Girls Championship
Silver medal – second place	2018	U-15 Team
- * Club domestic league appearances and goals as of 8 November 2026 ‡ National team caps and goals as of 10 October 2026

Karly Carlos Harfouche (Arabic: كارلي كارلوس حرفوش; born 3 August 2004) is a Lebanese footballer who plays as a centre-back for Turkish club 1207 Antalya Spor and the Lebanon national team.

== Club career ==
In 2023, Harfouche was part of the Bethel Pilots roster that won their first NCCAA National Championship; she was included to the All-Tournament Team.

On 9 January 2025, Harfouche joined No Limits.

She moved to Turkey in August 2026, and signed with Turkish Women's Super League club 1207 Antalya Spor.

== International career ==
Harfouche was first called up to the Lebanon national team ahead of two friendly matches against Palestine in July 2023. She made her international debut on 18 July 2023 against Palestine. She was called up to the 2024 WAFF Women's Championship.

== Personal life ==
Harfouche studied at Brummana High School in Lebanon, before studying kinesiology and exercise science at Bethel University in Indiana.

== See also ==
- List of Lebanon women's international footballers
