= Arax (disambiguation) =

The Arax, or Aras, is a river in the Caucasus.

Arax may also refer to:

- Arax (weekly), Armenian-language newspaper in Iran
- Arax Mansourian (born 1946), Armenian classical singer
- Arax Airways, a defunct airline of Armenia
- Arax, a fictional character in Dark Matter
