= Puru (artist) =

Chinese painter, calligrapher and nobleman (1893-1963)

- 溥儒
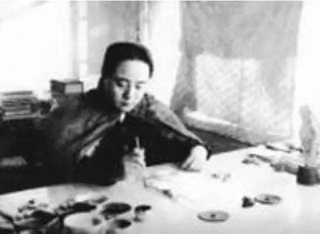
- Born: Aisin Gioro Puru (爱新觉罗·溥儒); August 30, 1896; Beijing, Qing dynasty, China
- Died: November 18, 1963 (aged 67); Taipei, Taiwan
- Resting place: Yangmingshan No.1 Public Cemetery
- Education: Royal College of Law and Political Science (贵胄法政学堂), Beijing, 1913
- Occupations: Painter, professor, politician
- Spouses: Luo Qingyuan (died 1947): Lee Moyun
- Children: Pu Yuli; Pu Yucen; Pu Yuqi
- Relatives: Prince Gong (Grandfather); Puyi (Cousin)
- Family: Aisin Gioro

Puru
- Chinese: 溥儒
Transcriptions
Standard Mandarin
- Hanyu Pinyin: Pǔrú
- Wade–Giles: P'u-ju

Courtesy name
- Chinese: 溥心畬
Transcriptions
Standard Mandarin
- Hanyu Pinyin: Pǔ Xīnyú
- Wade–Giles: P'u Hsin-yü

Art name
- Chinese: 寒玉堂
Transcriptions
Standard Mandarin
- Hanyu Pinyin: Hán Yùtáng
- Wade–Giles: Han Yü-t’ang

Sobriquet
- Chinese: 西山逸士
- Literal meaning: Hermit of the Western Mountain
Transcriptions
Standard Mandarin
- Hanyu Pinyin: Xīshānyìshì

Puru (Chinese: 溥儒; August 30, 1896 – November 18, 1963), courtesy name Xinyu (心畬), art name Han Yutang (寒玉堂), sobriquet Xishanyishi (西山逸士), later known as Pu Xinyu (溥心畬), was a traditional Chinese painter, calligrapher and nobleman. A member of the Manchu Aisin Gioro clan, the ruling house of the Qing dynasty, he was a cousin to Puyi, the last Emperor of China. It was speculated that Puru would have succeeded to the Chinese throne if Puyi and the Qing government were not overthrown after the 1911 Xinhai Revolution.

Puru was reputed to be as talented as the famous southern artist Zhang Daqian (Chang Ta-ch'ien). Together, they became known as "P'u of the North and Chang of the South."

Puru fled to Taiwan after the Chinese Communist Party came to power, and was appointed by Chiang Kai-shek as a Manchu representative at the National Constituent Assembly. In Taiwan, he made a living selling paintings and calligraphy, teaching as a professor of fine arts at the National Taiwan Normal University, and eventually dying in Taipei.

== Names ==
Puru was born as Aisin Gioro Puru (愛新覺羅 溥儒). He shared his family name Aisin Gioro with the other members of the Qing imperial family. He was a part of the Pu generation of imperial sons. The second character, the given name, ru (儒) was bestowed upon him by the Guangxu Emperor. His courtesy name was "Xinyu" (心畬). After fleeing to Taiwan, he adopted his generation name "Pu" as his family name and took his courtesy name "Xinyu" as his personal name, and was thus then on known in full as Pu Xinyu (溥心畬). While working as a calligrapher, he took on the art name "Han Yutang" (寒玉堂).

While living in seclusion with his family at a temple in the 1910s, he took on the sobriquet "Xishanyishi" (西山逸士, lit. "Hermit of the Western Mountain"). This name is engraved on his tombstone.

== Biography ==
Puru was born in the Manchu Aisin Gioro clan as the second son of Zaiying (載瀅), a son of Prince Gong. His mother was Lady Xiang (項氏), a secondary spouse of Zaiying. Puru received "a strictly traditional education" and spent much of his early years at Jietai Monastery, in Xishan (Western Hills), near Beijing. Being a member of the ruling imperial elite, his family owned a large collection of art works which Puru was able to study as he developed his artistic skills.

Puru was once selected as a potential candidate to succeed the Guangxu Emperor, but his cousin Puyi was chosen instead. After he returned from Europe, he retreated into the Western Mountains, where he spent many years in Jietai Monastery to concentrate on his studies. After the fall of the Qing dynasty in 1911, he changed his family name to "Pu".

In 1947, Puru was appointed by Chiang Kai-shek as a Manchu representative at the National Constituent Assembly. He was strongly against Puyi's cooperation with the Empire of Japan. In 1949, when the Chinese Communist Party came to power, Pu fled to Taiwan.

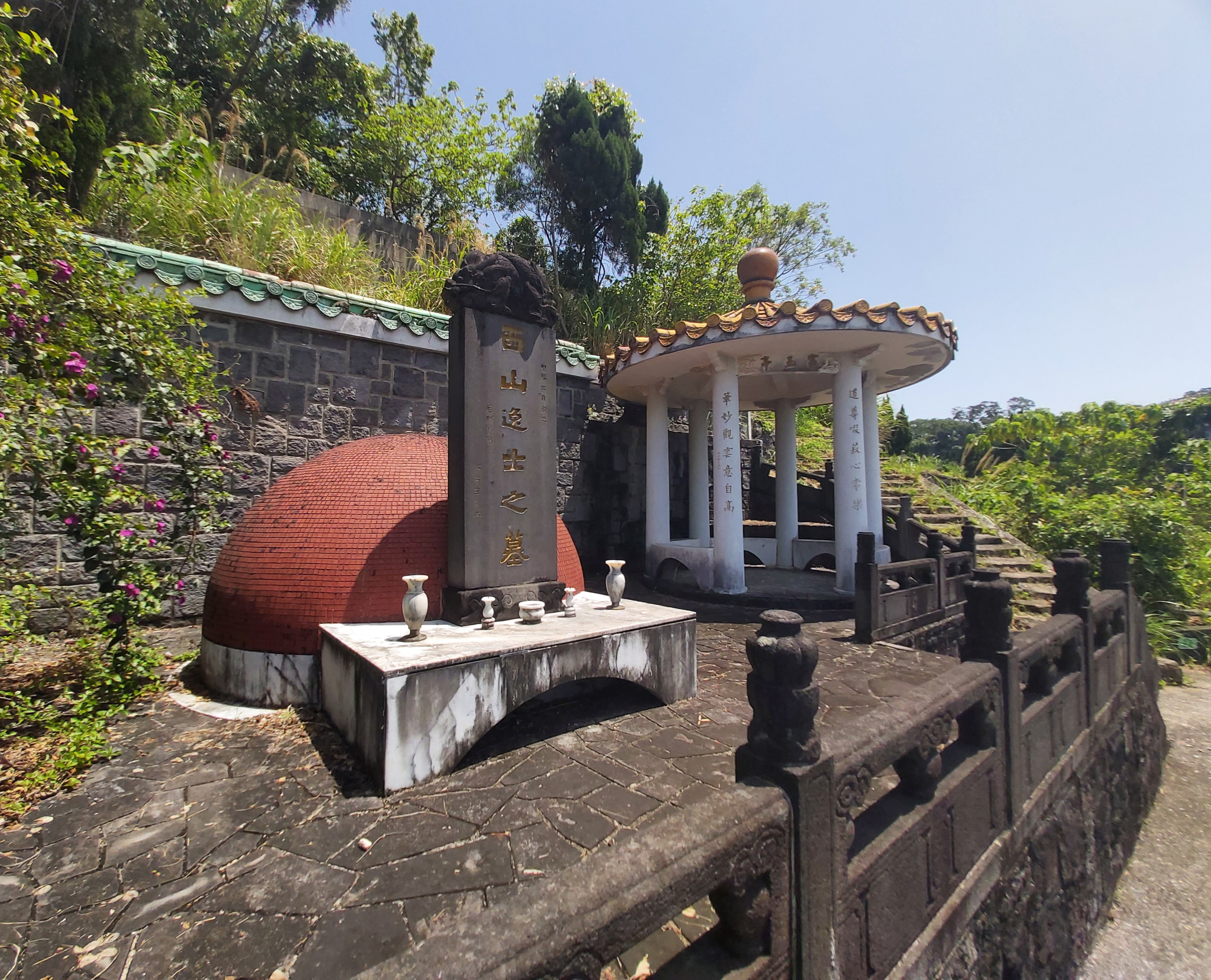
Tomb of Puru in Yangmingshan No. 1 Public Cemetery, Taipei.

In Taiwan, Puru made a living by selling paintings and calligraphy works during the first months of his arrival in Taipei. He lived in a Japanese-style house on Linyi Street in Taipei that the government provided for him. He was appointed in October 1949 as a professor of fine arts at the National Taiwan Normal University. In 1959, he held a two-week-long art exhibition at the National Museum of History with 318 works on display.

Puru died in 1963 and was buried in the Yangmingshan No. 1 Public Cemetery in Taipei.

== Career ==
Puru worked at a variety of places during his life. These included Kyoto Imperial University (1928-1928), Peking National College of Art (1934-1949), Republic of China National Assembly Representative (1947-1963), National Taiwan Normal University Art Department (1950-1963), and Tunghai University Art Department (1955-1963).

== Family and Issue ==
- Father: Zaiying (載瀅; 1861 - 1909), second son of Yixin, Prince Gong (sixth son of the Daoguang Emperor).
- Mother: Lady Xiang (項氏), a secondary consort of Zaiying.
- Spouses:
  - First wife, of the Dolote clan (多罗特), personal name Luo Qingyuan (羅清媛), mother of Yuli and Yucen
  - Second wife, personal name Li Moyun (李墨雲)
- Children:
  - Pu Yuli (溥毓岦); b. 1924, first son, also known as Xiaohua (孝華)
  - Pu Yucen (溥毓岑; b. 1925), second son
  - Pu Yuqi (溥毓岐), adopted son

== See also ==
- Manchu people in Taiwan
- Chang Dai-chien
- Qigong (artist)
- Guanghua Temple (Beijing)
- Qing Dynasty nobility
- Ranks of Imperial Consorts in China Qing
- Taiwanese art
