= Arak, Republic of Dagestan =

Arak Арак Әрак
- Selo
- Location within Republic of Dagestan Location within Russia
- Coordinates: 41°57′N 47°59′E
- Country: Russia
- Region: Republic of Dagestan
- District: Tabasaransky District
- Time zone: UTC+3:00

Arak (Russian: Арак; Azerbaijani: Әрак, Ərak) is a rural locality (a selo) and the administrative centre of Araksky Selsoviet, Tabasaransky District, Republic of Dagestan, Russia. Population: 464 (2010 census); 524 (2002 census); 367 (1989 Soviet census). There are 4 streets.

== Geography ==
It is located 12 km (7.5 mi) southwest of Khuchni. Novoye Lidzhe is the nearest rural locality.
