= Miharu Araki =

Japanese ice hockey player

Personal information
- Nationality: Japanese
- Born: 20 July 1971 (age 53); Tochigi, Japan

Sport
- Sport: Ice hockey

Miharu Araki (荒城 三晴, Araki Miharu, born 20 July 1971) is a Japanese ice hockey player. She competed in the women's tournament at the 1998 Winter Olympics.
