= Araki (restaurant) =

Sushi restaurant in Ginza, Tokyo, Japan

Coordinates: 35.6488793721269°N 139.73729904430445°E

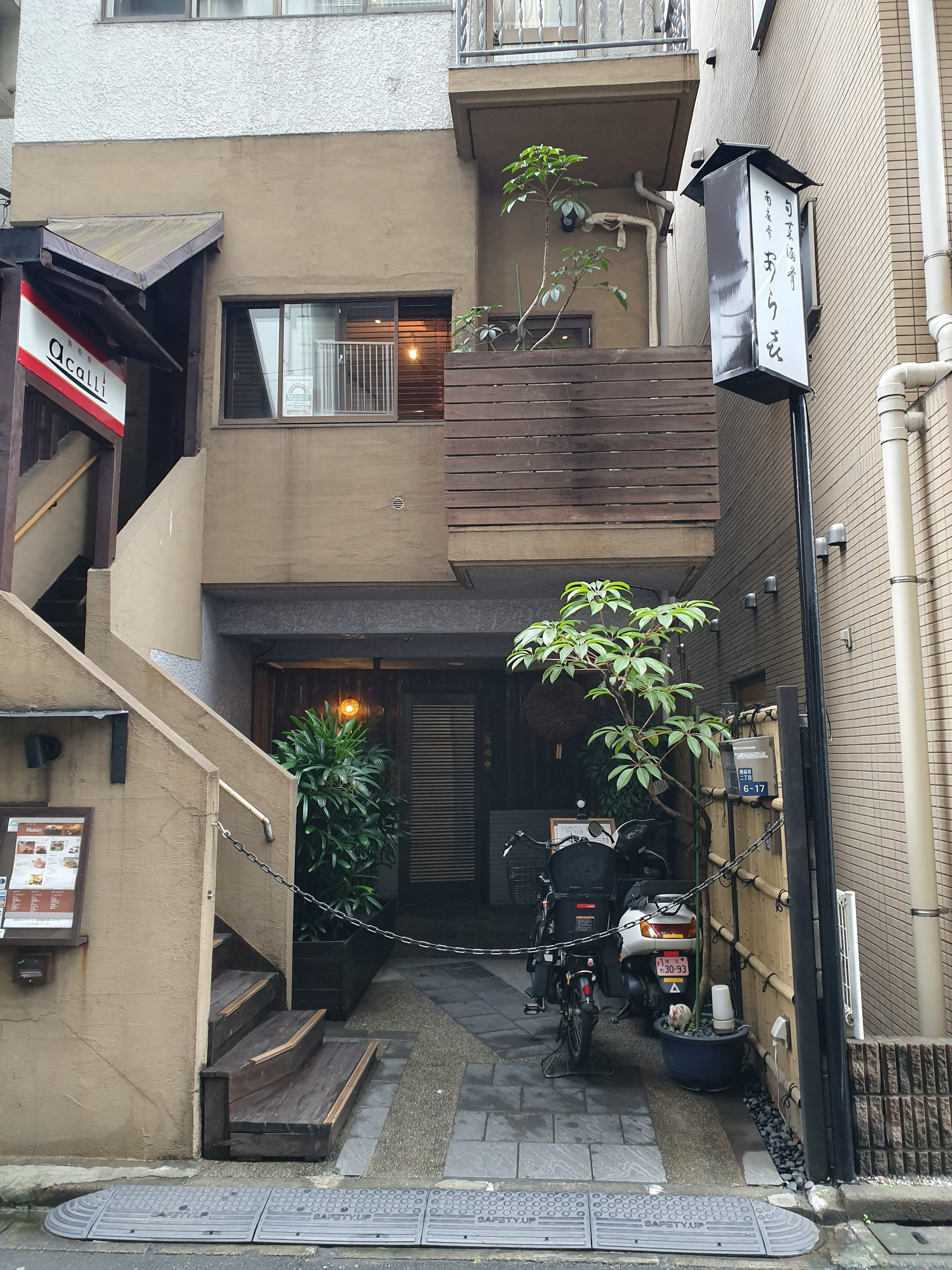
The former site of Araki in 2021

Araki (Japanese: あら輝, Hepburn: Araki) was a sushi restaurant operated by Japanese chef Mitsuhiro Araki in the Ginza area of Tokyo, Japan. It received three Michelin stars, the highest possible rating, in 2011. Described as "Japan's most difficult restaurant to make a booking at", it was known for its seafood and for showcasing Japanese culture, with staff members often wearing traditional clothes. The average cost was around ¥62,160 (approximately $400) per person.

The restaurant closed in February 2013, when Araki left for London in preparation for the opening of its successor The Araki in October 2014. The London restaurant also received three Michelin stars, but lost all three in 2020 following Araki's departure for Hong Kong.

== See also ==
- List of Michelin starred restaurants
- List of sushi restaurants
- The Araki
