= Takahiro Araki =

Japanese baseball player (born 1987)

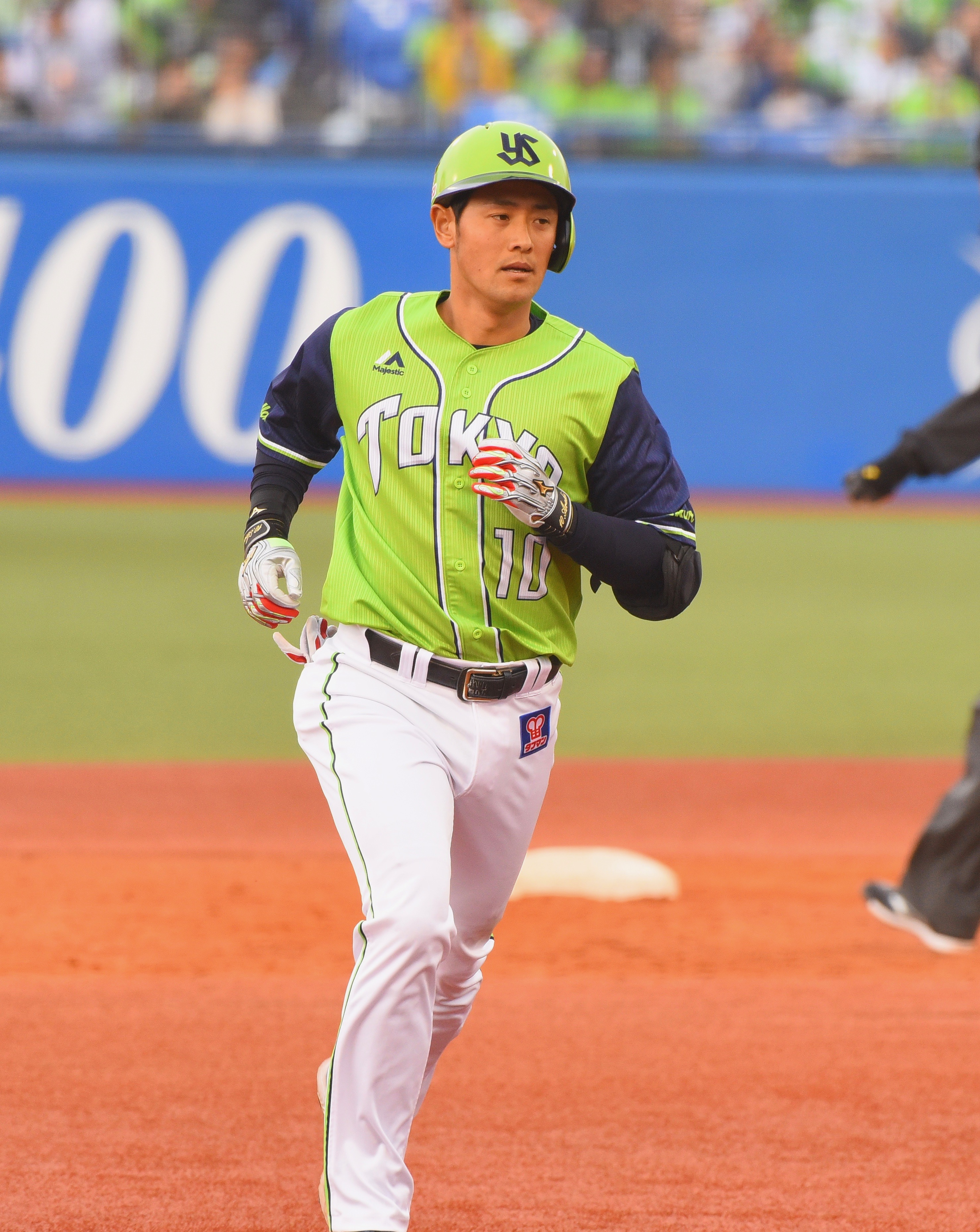
- Araki in 2018 with the Tokyo Yakult Swallows
- Infielder / Outfielder
- Born: July 26, 1987 (age 38); Oyabe, Toyama, Japan
- Batted: Right Threw: Right

debut
- March 26, 2010, for the Tokyo Yakult Swallows

Last appearance
- September 30, 2023, for the Tokyo Yakult Swallows

Career statistics (through 2023 season)
- Batting average: .228
- Hits: 241
- Home runs: 18
- RBIs: 116
- Stolen bases: 16
- Stats at Baseball Reference

Teams
- Tokyo Yakult Swallows (2010–2023)

Career highlights and awards
- 1× Japan Series champion (2021)

Takahiro Araki (荒木 貴裕, Araki Takahiro; born July 26, 1987 in Oyabe, Toyama, Japan) is a former professional Japanese baseball player.
