= Tōichirō Araki =

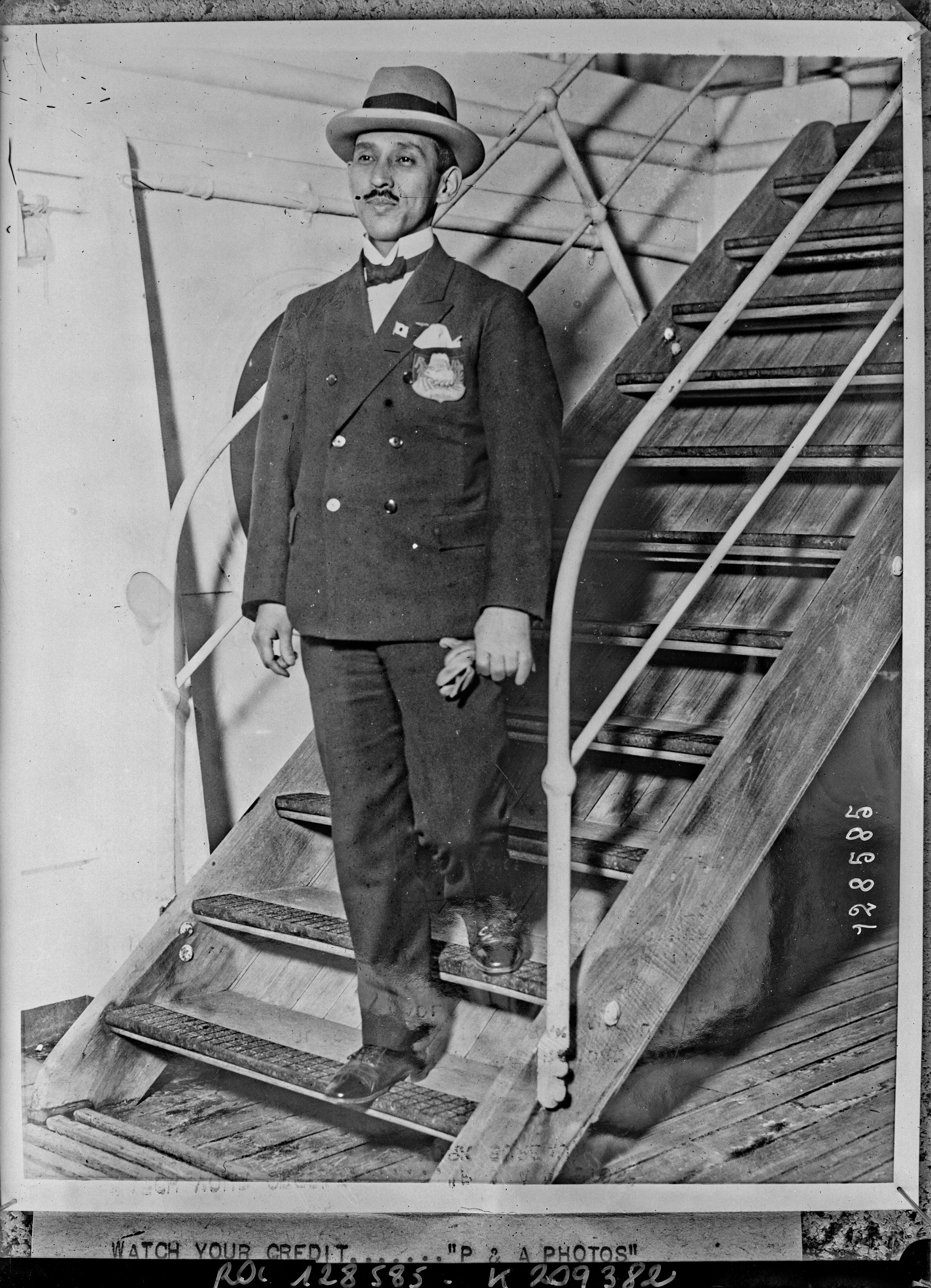
Tōichirō Araki on race around the world

Tōichirō Araki (荒木 東一郎, Araki Tōichirō; January 25, 1895 – May 15, 1977) was a Japanese writer, scientist, and engineer who won a race around the world in 1928. He wrote many books, most notably Prince of the Air: Around the World in 33 Days, and is sometimes called the Pioneer of Efficiency Management in Japan. He was one of the first successful professional business consultants in Japan. Araki managed to meet with two prominent industrial engineers and industrial psychologists, Lillian Gilbreth and Harrington Emerson. Toichiro had three daughters, Keiko, Nobuko, and Aiko.

In 1945, Japanese military police arrested Toichiro Araki on the pretext of being a spy.
