= The Araki =

- The Araki logo
- Interactive map of The Araki

Restaurant information
- Established: 2014; 12 years ago
- Chef: Marty Lau
- Food type: Sushi
- Location: 12, New Burlington Street, London, W1, United Kingdom
- Coordinates: 51°30′42″N 0°08′25″W
- Seating capacity: 16 (10 at the counter, 6 in a private dining room)
- Other information: Nearest station: Piccadilly Circus
- Website: the-araki.co.uk

The Araki is a sushi restaurant founded by Japanese chef Mitsuhiro Araki which opened in London in 2014. It was awarded two stars in the 2016 Michelin Guide for the UK and Ireland, before being awarded three in the 2018 guide, making it the first Japanese restaurant to win three stars in Europe. In the 2020 guide, it lost all its 3 stars following the departure of head chef Mitsuhiro Araki.

== Description ==
Chef Mitsuhiro Araki had previously run a restaurant in Tokyo called Araki for which he held three Michelin stars, but chose to close it in February 2013 in order to pursue a new challenge. He had considered New York, Paris, and Singapore, but chef Joël Robuchon suggested London to him. The move took three years to organise.

The interior of the restaurant, designed by the Takenaka Corporation, features a counter made from 200-year-old cypress wood gifted to Araki by Japanese musician Ryuichi Sakamoto. That counter is divided from the kitchen by a pair of green curtains, and the overall look of the interior is based upon the architecture of the Japanese Edo period. There are only fifteen seats – nine at the counter and six in a private dining room. The restaurant formed part of a £250 million redevelopment of the combined office and retail space at Burlington Street.

In March 2019, Mitsuhiro Araki left London returning to Japan, and his apprentice UK born Marty Lau took over the position of head chef.

The restaurant offers a single choice of a set menu consisting of three starters usually, followed by sushi and dessert, with two sittings taking place each evening. Araki has modified the style of sushi he has made to take into account European produce, such as salmon sushi, Cornish squid, and langoustines. Other dishes include similar designs to those he used at his previous restaurant, but from sources within Europe, such as his signature tuna sashimi, in which he serves three different cuts of the fish.

== Reception ==
Chef Jason Atherton called the food at The Araki "mind blowing" and said that it was as good as any restaurant in Japan. The Araki was named the best Japanese restaurant in London by Tatler magazine in their 2015 restaurant guide. In September 2015, The Araki was awarded two stars in the 2016 Michelin Guide for the UK and Ireland. It was one of two Japanese restaurants in London to be elevated to the two-star level that year, the other being Umu, which is located a short distance away from The Araki. The Araki was awarded a third star in the 2018 guide, announced in October 2017. It was then stripped of all 3 stars in the 2020 guide.

== See also ==
- List of Japanese restaurants
- List of sushi restaurants
- "Araki" – in Tokyo, Japan
