= Ege Araç =

Turkish footballer (born 2007)

Personal information
- Date of birth: 28 February 2007 (age 19)
- Place of birth: Istanbul, Turkey
- Position: Defensive midfielder

Team information
- Current team: Galatasaray

Youth career
- 2016–2020: Güngören Atletikspor
- 2020–: Galatasaray

International career^{‡}
Years	Team	Apps	(Gls)
2022	Turkey U15	2	(0)
2022–2023	Turkey U16	7	(0)
2023–2024	Turkey U17	15	(0)
2024–	Turkey U18	5	(0)
- ‡ National team caps and goals as of 03:58, 14 February 2024 (UTC)

Ege Araç (born 28 February 2007) is a Turkish professional footballer who plays as a defensive midfielder for Turkish club Galatasaray football academy.

== Club career ==
He joined Galatasaray football academy as a child in 2020.

On 15 October 2024, he was named by English newspaper The Guardian as one of the best players born in 2007 worldwide.

== International career ==
Araç has represented Turkey youth national teams from under-15 to under-18 level.
