= Minol Araki =

Japanese painter and interior designer

- 荒木 實
- Born: 1928; Dalian, Kwantung, China
- Died: 2010 (aged 81–82)
- Known for: painting and industrial design
- Style: Japanese Zen, contemporary abstract, Nihonga

Minol Araki or Minoru Araki (荒木 實; 1928 – 2010) was a Japanese painter and industrial designer.

== Life and education ==
Araki was born in Dalian, in Japanese-occupied Kwantung Leased Territory, in 1928. His father owned a restaurant and died when Araki was a teenager. Araki began painting at an early age and at age seven entered the tutelage of an old Chinese painter who his parents were friends with. He studied traditional Chinese painting until moving back to Japan after World War II. He then pursued graphic design and industrial design, and studied under modernist and avant-garde artists in Tokyo. Araki died in 2010.

== Work ==
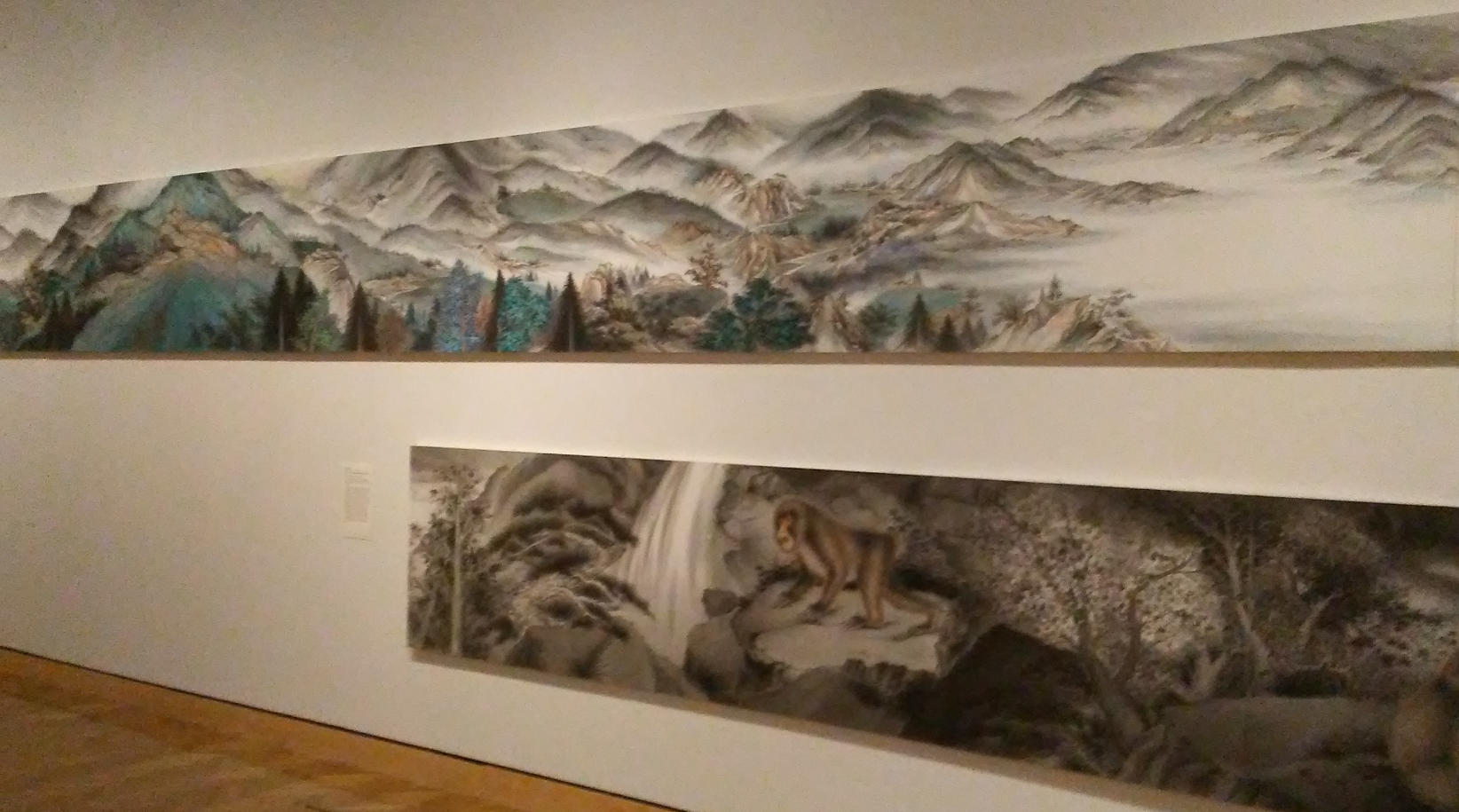
Installation view of paintings by Minol Araki at the Minneapolis Institute of Art.

Inspired in part by Raymond Loewy's book Never Leave Well Enough Alone, Araki started a career in industrial design in the 1950s. In the 1960s, he started a network of design studios. During his career as a designer, Araki worked on housewares such as lamps, calendars, and organizers, and byōbu, traditional Japanese folding screens.

In the 1970s, Araki was mentored by painter Zhang Daqian. After Zhang's death, Araki created five paintings demonstrating his mentor's influence and his personal interest in modern Japanese painting methods. These paintings, which are each over 70 feet long, contain multiple panels illustrating landscapes, dragons, and other natural scenes. In addition to influences from Zhang, these paintings also demonstrate influence from Bada Shanren, Ben Shahn, and medieval Japanese Zen painters.

Araki's work was also influenced by his travels, and by painters Henri de Toulouse-Lautrec and Egon Schiele. Another interest was Pablo Picasso and other contemporary abstract painters. Through various styles, Araki is known for his literati painting and expressing his unique perspective as someone with various cultural influences, both from upbringing and his travels. Araki's best-known piece is Snow Monkeys at Play in Autumn and Winter, a work that is inspired by the Nihonga painting style of 20th-century Japan. He is also known for a series of lotus paintings.

From the 1970s to the 1990s, Araki was hired by the American consumer electronics company Yorx to design many of its compact stereos and hi-fi gear. Araki's designs for York were noted by journalists for their striking accents, characterized by intricate control panels intended to resemble aircraft cockpits.

Unlike most artists, Araki did not collect old paintings, preferring to save antique painting instruments, like brushes, ink and inkstones, and paper. This may have been inspired by his mentor Zhang's work in textile dyeing. For most of his career, Araki did not exhibit or sell any of his pieces. His business work allowed him the financial freedom to pursue his art without having the need to sell it.

On his art, Araki said, "My painting is a celebration of nature, a grateful song to all forms of creation expressed through brush painting. By drawing from both East and West, I hope to achieve a perspective which is international, a bridge between cultures."

== Collections ==
Araki's work has been exhibited in the collections and/or traveling exhibits of the following:

- Erik Thomsen Gallery in New York
- Metropolitan Museum of Art
- Minneapolis Institute of Art
- National Museum of History in Taipei
- Phoenix Art Museum (1999)
