= Shoko Araki =

Japanese speech processing researcher

Shoko Araki (Japanese: 荒木 章子) is a Japanese speech processing researcher known for her research in signal separation. She is a senior research scientist for Nippon Telegraph and Telephone in the NTT Communication Science Laboratories, where she heads the Signal Processing Research Group in the Media Information Research Department.

After earning bachelor's and master's degrees at the University of Tokyo in 1998 and 2000, Araki completed her doctorate in 2007 at Hokkaido University. She has been affiliated with NTT since 2000.

In 2001, the Acoustical Society of Japan gave Araki their Awaya Prize Young Researcher Award, and in 2008 they gave her their Itakura Prize Innovative Young Researcher Award. In 2022, Araki was named an IEEE Fellow "for contributions to blind source separation of noisy and reverberant speech signals".
