= Daisuke Araki =

Japanese baseball player (born 1964)

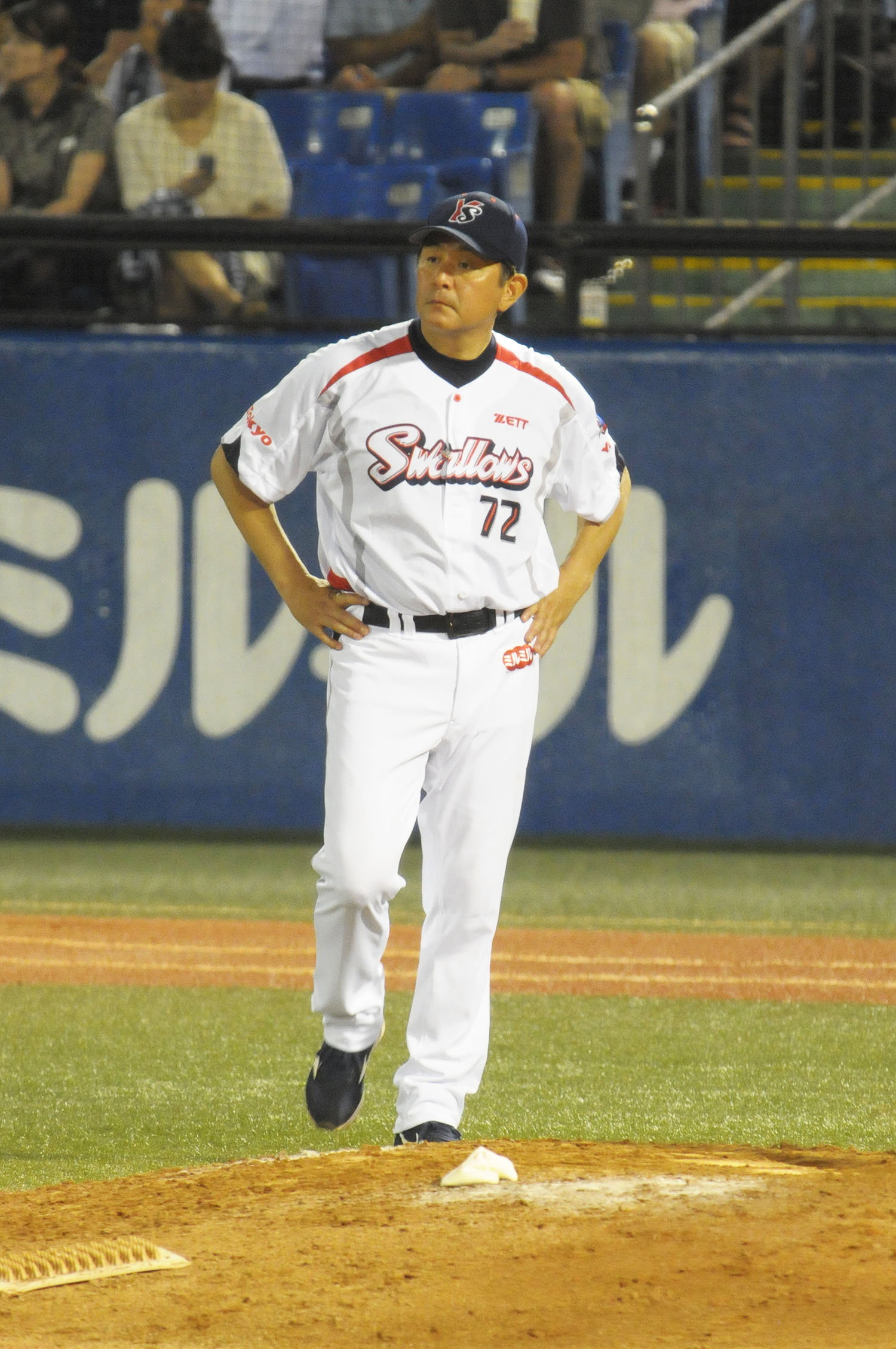
- Pitcher
- Born: May 6, 1964 (age 62); Chōfu, Tokyo, Japan
- Batted: Right Threw: Right

NPB debut
- April 26, 1983, for the Yakult Swallows

Last NPB appearance
- October 9, 1996, for the Yokohama BayStars

NPB statistics (through 1996)
- Win–loss record: 39-49
- Saves: 2
- ERA: 4.80
- Strikeouts: 359
- Stats at Baseball Reference

Teams
- As player: Yakult Swallows (1983–1995); Yokohama BayStars (1996); As coach: Seibu Lions (2004–2007); Tokyo Yakult Swallows (2008–2013); Hokkaido Nippon-Ham Fighters (2018–2021)

Career highlights and awards
- 1× NPB All-Star (1986); 2× Japan Series champion (1993, 1995)
- Last updated on: 29 December 2021

Daisuke Araki (荒木 大輔, Araki Daisuke; born May 6, 1964) is a former Nippon Professional Baseball pitcher.

He is known for being the namesake of former Major League Baseball pitcher Daisuke Matsuzaka.
