= Araks, Armenia (Araks Municipality) =

Village in Armavir, Armenia

Araks Արաքս
- Location within Armenia
- Coordinates: 40°03′17″N 44°18′10″E
- Country: Armenia
- Province: Armavir
- Municipality: Araks
- Founded: 1923

Population (2011)
  - Total: 1,364
- Time zone: UTC+4

Araks (Armenian: Արաքս), known as Nerkin Karkhun and Sharifabad until 1946, is a village in the eastern part of the Armavir Province of Armenia, specifically in the Araks Municipality.
