= Arakichō =

Tokyo neighborhood

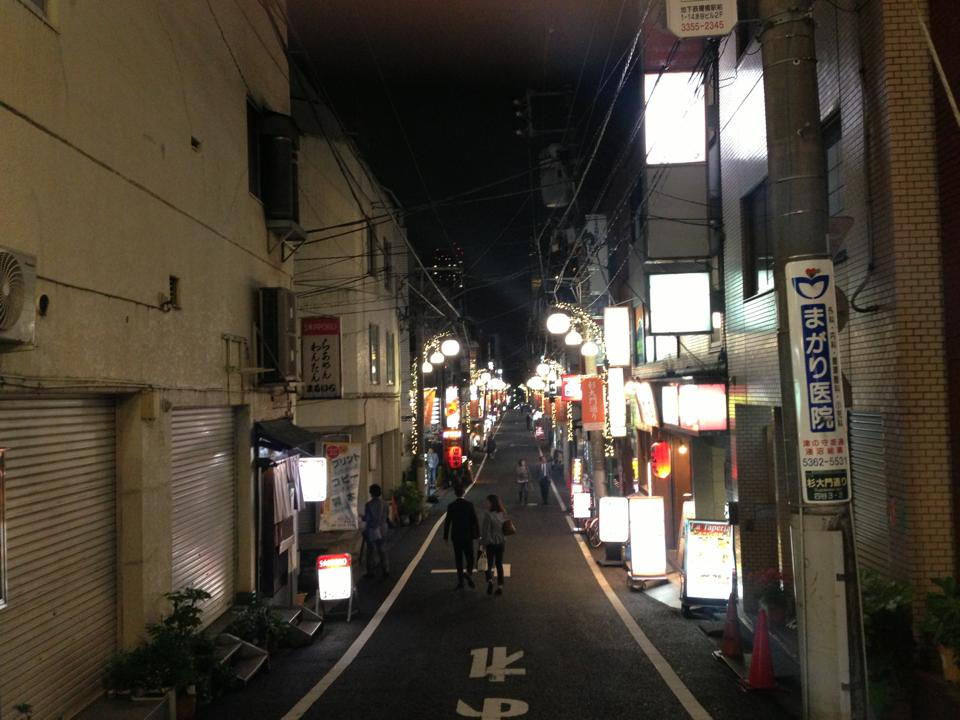
Arakichō at night in 2017

Arakichō (荒木町) is a neighborhood in Shinjuku, Tokyo. Its postal code is 160–0007. Yotsuya-sanchōme Station is a major train hub in the area.

== Geography ==
Arakichō is located in the southeastern part of Shinjuku Ward. The northern part borders Sumiyoshicho and Katamachi, and the eastern part borders Morisaka-dori in Tsu, which borders Yotsuya-zakacho and Yotsuya-Saneicho. The southern part borders Yotsuya 3-chome. The western part borders Funamachi. The area is bowl-shaped, with the pond at the back of the Araki Mansion in the center of the area at its bottom. It retains the appearance of a former entertainment district, but now has high-rise buildings.

== History ==
During the Edo period, the Arakicho area was the site of the residence of Matsudaira Yoshiyuki, lord of the Takasu Domain in Mino Province. Morisaka Street in Tsu, which borders the northern edge of Arakicho, is also named after Yoshiyuki (Lord of Settsu). Even after Yoshiyuki's death, the area continued to serve as the Takasu Domain's main residence, and at the end of the Edo period, Matsudaira Yoshitake's four sons, the Takasu Brothers were born here: second son Tokugawa Yoshikatsu, fifth son Tokugawa Shigehide, seventh son Matsudaira Katamori, and eighth son Matsudaira Sadakata.

The Takasu Domain's main residence had a large pond with a waterfall. Because Tokugawa Ieyasu used this pond to wash his riding whip, it came to be known as "Saku no Ike" (Saku Pond).

"Yotsuya Arakicho" was established on November 2, 1872 (Meiji 5). The neighborhood's name comes from Arakizaka (also known as Shinkizaka and Tsu no Morizaka) and Araki Yokocho, which run along its eastern edge. After the Meiji Restoration, the Matsudaira family, the lords of Takasu Domain, moved their residence there, and the pond and gardens became known to the public. The area became a renowned scenic spot in the Tokyo suburbs, and a red-light district developed, with restaurants lining the streets and geisha frequenting the area. In 1911, the name was changed from "Yotsuya Arakicho" to "Arakicho."

The red-light district Arakicho reached its peak after the Great Kanto Earthquake. Due to damage to other red-light districts, customers flocked to Arakicho, and the area boasted 13 restaurants, 63 waiting rooms, 86 okiya (brothels), and 252 geisha. However, during the war, the red-light district's business was scaled back, and it suffered devastating damage in the Great Tokyo Air Raids of 1945. Although it recovered after the war, it declined in the 1960s (1966-1975), and Arakicho's status as a red-light district declined in the late 1970s and early 1980s.

Even today, various restaurants can be found along the streets and back alleys of Sharikkanmon-dori and Sugidaimon-dori within the town, and you can still see traces of the atmosphere of the former red-light district. Although the size of Sakenoike Pond has shrunk considerably, it still remains at Tsunomori Benzaiten. Many people visit the town, as it retains a strong sense of the atmosphere of the 1950s.
