= Araqi, Iran =

Araqi عراقي
- Village
- Location within Iran
- Coordinates: 37°11′08″N 57°25′32″E
- Country: Iran
- Province: North Khorasan
- County: Esfarayen
- Bakhsh: Central
- Rural District: Ruin

Population (2006)
  - Total: 507
- Time zone: UTC+3:30 (IRST)
  - Summer (DST): UTC+4:30 (IRDT)

Araqi (Persian: عراقي, also Romanized as ‘Arāqī; also known as ‘Arāq) is a village in Ruin Rural District, in the Central District of Esfarayen County, North Khorasan Province, Iran. At the 2006 census, its population was 507, in 109 families.
