= Jonathan Arac =

American literary scholar

Jonathan Arac is an American literary scholar. He is the Andrew W. Mellon Professor of Literature at the University of Pittsburgh, and was previously a visiting professor at Columbia University from 2001 to 2006 and director of the University of Pittsburgh's Humanities Center from 2008 to 2019. He has also been on the editorial board of the literary journal Boundary 2 since 1979.

== Selected works ==
- Commissioned spirits: the shaping of social motion in Dickens, Carlyle, Melville, and Hawthorne. New Brunswick, N.J.: Rutgers University Press. 1979. ISBN 978-0-8135-0874-0.
- Critical genealogies: historical situations for postmodern literary studies. New York: Columbia University Press. 1987. ISBN 978-0-231-06254-1.
- Huckleberry Finn as idol and target: the functions of criticism in our time. Madison: University of Wisconsin Press. 1997. ISBN 978-0-299-15530-8.
- The emergence of American literary narrative, 1820-1860. Cambridge, M.A.: Harvard University Press. 2005. ISBN 978-0-674-01869-3.
- Impure worlds: the institution of literature in the age of the novel. New York: Fordham University Press. 2011. ISBN 978-0-8232-3178-2.
