= Özlem Araç =

Turkish footballer and manager

Personal information
- Date of birth: May 26, 1989 (age 37)
- Place of birth: Ankara, Turkey

Team information
- Current team: 1207 Antalya Muratpaşa Belediye Spor
2009–2011	Başkentgücü Spor	18	(1)
2011–2012	Medical Park Antalyaspor	10	(1)
Total		28	(2)

Managerial career
- Years: Team
- 2013–2014: Çankırıspor
- 2014–2017: 1207 Antalya Spor

Özlem Araç (born May 26, 1989) is a Turkish female football manager and former women's football player. Currently, she coached 1207 Antalya Spor in the Women's First League.

== Early years ==
Özlem Araç was born in Ankara, Turkey on May 26, 1989. She graduated in Physical Education and Sports from Gazi Universitz in Ankara specializing in football coaching.

=== Player ===
Özlem Araç obtained her license from the Women's Regional League club Yeni Kapı Gençler Birliği in Antalya. She began paying after her transfer to the Ankara-based team Başkentgücü Spor in the 2009–10 season of the Regional League. She capped in 18 matches and scored one goal in two seasons. In the 2011–12 season, she played for Medical Park Antalyaspor in the Women's First League. She retired after one season, in which she played ten games and netted one goal.

=== Manager ===
Özlem Araç began her managerial career by July 2013 as assistant coach at the men's team Çankırıspor, which competed in the TFF Second League.

On September 30, 2014, she signed with her club a manager contract. She was successful to have her team, which was renamed to 1207 Antalya Spor, to finish the season 2014–15 in the Women's Second League as champion, and so get promoted to the Women's First League. She left 1207 Antalya Spor at the end of the regular season of the 2016–17 Women's First League before the play-off round.

== Career statistics ==
=== Player ===
As of match played April 4, 2012

Club	Season	League			Continental		National		Total	
Club	Season	Division	Apps	Goals	Apps	Goals	Apps	Goals	Apps	Goals
Başkentgücü Spor	2009–10	Regöonal League	9	0	–	–	–	–	9	0
Başkentgücü Spor	2010–11	Second League	9	1	–	–	–	–	9	1
Başkentgücü Spor	Total		18	1	-	–	–	–	18	1
Medical Park Antalyaspor	2011–12	First League	10	1	–	–	–	–	10	1
Medical Park Antalyaspor	Total		10	1	–	–	–	–	10	1
Career total			28	2	–	–	–	-	28	2

=== Manager ===
As of April 14, 2017.

Team	From	To	Record				
Team	From	To	G	W	D	L	Win %
1207 Antalya Spor
1207 Antalya Spor	2014	2015	22	18	3	1	81.82
1207 Antalya Spor	2015	2016	18	12	2	4	66.67
1207 Antalya Spor	2016	2017	18	10	4	4	55.56
Total			58	40	9	9	68.97
