= Arax (weekly) =

Arax (Արաքս in Armenian) is an Armenian language literary, social and cultural weekly newspaper published in Tehran, Iran.

Arax also has an online edition in Armenian and Persian.
