= Araqi (drink) =

Date-liquor distilled illegally in Sudan

- Type: Distilled alcoholic spirit
- Origin: Sudan, Sudan and South Sudan
- Introduced: Medieval
- Alcohol by volume: Variable, 30–80%
- Proof (US): 60–160°
- Color: clear
- Ingredients: dates, water, yeast

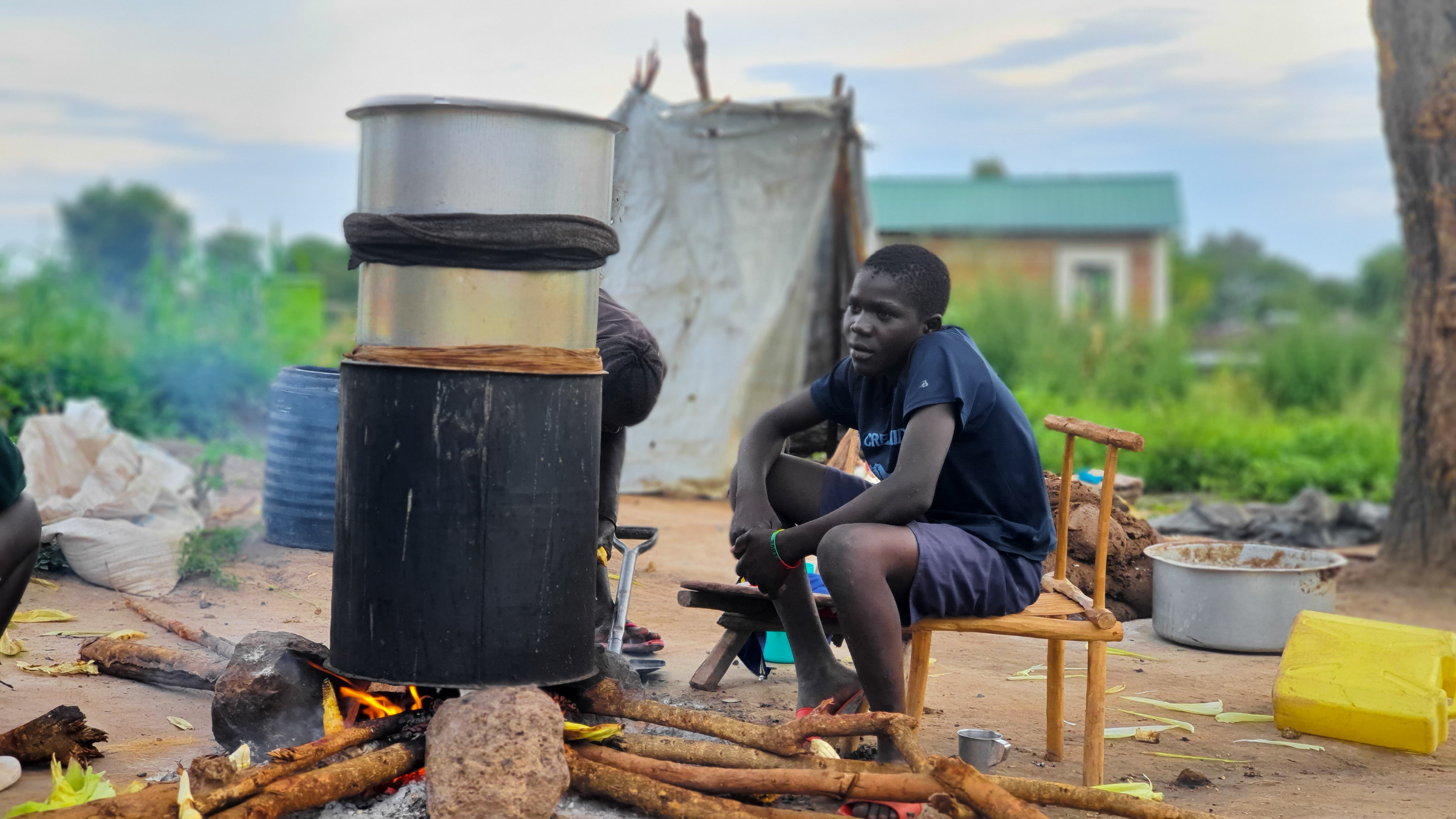
Boy distilling alcohol in South Sudan; most araqi is made in home stills like this.

Araqi (Arabic: عرقي, romanized: ʿaraqī; also araki, aragy) is a liquor distilled in Sudan. The 1983 introduction of sharia in Sudan banned sales of alcohol, but a black market exists to meet local demand. The drink is made by mixing dates with water and yeast, fermenting the mix, and then distilling it. It is usually drunk neat.

During the war in Darfur, a number of southern Sudanese women came to the north as refugees, and found that some of the only professions available to them were prostitution or brewing araqi, the latter being a skill some already had, with a reliable market demand. A 2000 UN report noted that 80% of the women in Khartoum's women's prison were there on charges of prostitution or brewing araqi.

Araqi is also popular in South Sudan, which split from Sudan in 2011 and where alcohol is legal.

Home distilling can lead to methanol poisoning; 10 died, and several others were blinded by a batch of incorrectly distilled araqi in East Darfur in 2017.

In 2020, a new law permitted alcohol sales to non-Muslims in Sudan.

== See also ==
- Arak (drink)
- Arrack
- Moonshine
- Rakia
