= Arrakis (disambiguation) =

Arrakis may refer to:

- Arrakis (fixed star), a various form of the proper name Alrakis for Mu Draconis.
- Arrakis (fictional planet), is also the name of the fictional planet on which Frank Herbert's novel Dune is set. However, the planet's primary is the star Canopus.
- Arrakis Planitia, a plain on Saturn's moon Titan
- Arrakis Therapeutics, a biotechnology company
- ARRAKIHS, planned mission by European Space Agency
- Arrakiscolex, a genus of fossil worm
- Arrakis (cricket), a genus of cricket in the subfamily Eneopterinae
