= 2020–21 Ghana Women's Premier League final =

Association football match

2020–21 Ghana Women's Premier League Final
Ampem Darkoa Ladies	Hasaacas Ladies
0	4
- Date: 26 June 2021
- Venue: Madina Astroturf, Accra
- Player of the Match: Sonia Opoku
- Referee: Joyce Ohenewaa Appiah
- Attendance: -

The 2020–21 Ghana Women's Premier League Final was an association football match which was played on 26th June 2021 Madina Astroturf in Accra, the capital of Ghana to determine winner of the Ghana Women's Premier League, the top tier women's league in Ghana. The two teams that qualified to the final were the winners of the two zones, the Northern Zone and the Southern Zone. between the two most successful women's team. At the end of the match Hasaacas Ladies won the match and won the league. Winners the final were set earn a trophy along with a cash prize of GHC50,000 and 40 gold medals, whilst qualifying for the CAF Women's Champions League.

== Match ==
=== Background ===
Hasaacas Ladies finished the season as the winners of the Southern Zone losing only a match. Ampem Darkoa Ladies emerged as the winners of the Northern Zone after going the whole season unbeaten. The two teams are the most successful women's team in Ghana. Prior to the final, Hasaacas had won the league on three occasions winning their last in 2014–15, whilst Ampem Darkoa had won the league two times last winning the league in 2017, therefore serving as the defending champions since the league was truncated in the 2018, and 2019–20 season.

Ampem Darkoa's Ophelia Serwaa Amponsah was the Championship's top scorer during the regular season with 17 goals while Veronica Appiah and Milot Abena Pokua were Hasaacas' leading scorers with 9 goals each, followed by Doris Boaduwaa on 8.

=== Summary ===
The match was initially set to start at 4:00pm, but due to a heavy downpour it was scheduled to 5:15 pm for kick off.

=== Details ===
26 June 2021
16:00

Ampem Darkoa Ladies	0–4	Hasaacas Ladies
	Report	Nyame 11'; Badu 30'; Boaduwaa 70' 84'

Madina Astroturf, Madina, Ghana
Referee: Joyce Ohenewaa Appiah

Ampem Darkoa Ladies	Hasaacas Ladies

GK	22	(Ghana) Deborah Brown
CB	4	(Ghana) Justice Tweneboaa (c)
CB	6	(Ghana) Patience Kundok
CB	7	(Ghana) Ophelia Amponsah
RM	8	(Ghana) Sonia Opoku
CM	9	(Ghana) Tracy Twum
CM	11	(Ghana) Mawia Uwasia
LM	13	(Ghana) Comfort Yeboah
AM	14	(Ghana) Priscilla Okyere
CF	16	(Ghana) Diana Antwi
CF	18	(Ghana) Abena Opoku
Substitutes:
GK	1	(Ghana) Evelyn Yeboah
DF	2	(Ghana) Comfort Frimpong
DF	3	(Ghana) Mavis Owusu
DF	5	(Ghana) Akyiaa Asante
MF	10	(Ghana) Fatima Adjei
MF	20	(Ghana) Mary Amponsah
MF	32	(Ghana) Jennifer Ofosuwaa
Head Coach:
(Ghana) Joe Nana Adarkwa

GK	16	(Ghana) Grace Baanwa
CB	3	(Ghana) Millot Pokuaa
CB	5	(Ghana) Janet Egyir (c)
CB	10	(Ghana) Doris Boaduwaa
DM	11	(Ghana) Faustina Aidoo
RM	13	(Ghana) Evelyn Badu
CM	18	(Ghana) Regina Antwi
CM	20	(Ghana) Queenabel Amankwaah
LM	25	(Ghana) Comfort Owusu
CF	28	(Ghana) Veronica Appiah
CF	34	(Ghana) Azumah Bugre
Substitutes:
GK	1	(Ghana) Faustina Nyamekye
DF	2	(Ghana) Francisca Asante
DF	6	(Ghana) Perpetual Agyekum
DF	14	(Ghana) Ama Appiah
DF	15	(Ghana) Success Ameyaa
MF	27	(Ghana) Doreen Copson
MF	8	(Ghana) Lily Niber-Lawrence
Head Coach:
(Ghana) Yusif Basigi

Player of the Match:

Sonia Opoku (Ampem Darkoa)
