= 2020–21 Ghana Women's Premier League =

Ghana Women's Football League season

Ghana Women's Premier League
- Season: 2020–21
- Dates: December 2020 — June 2021
- Country: (Ghana) (16 teams)
- Champions: Hasaacas Ladies
- Top goalscorer: Ophelia Serwaa Amponsah (17 goals)
- All statistics correct as of 27 June 2021. Live Matches on StarTimes

The 2020–21 Ghana Women's Premier League (GWPL) is the top division league for women. The league was launched in 2012 and it is currently in its 8th season. Hasaacas Ladies were crowned champions after beating Ampem Darkoa FC 4–0 in the Championship final.

== Season overview ==
The women's league went on a long break for the 2019–2020 season due to the COVID-19 pandemic. The season for 2020–2021 was set to kick off on 15 January 2021. The league is played in two zones: the Northern Zone and the Southern Zone. Winners of the northern and southern zones then meet in a championship final to declare the champions for the season.

== Prize money ==
- The club that places first in the league season would earn a trophy along with a cash prize of GHC50,000, 40 gold medals.
- The club that places second in the league season would receive GHC 30,000 and 40 silver medals.
- The club that places third in the league season would earn an amount of GHC 15,000 and 40 bronze medals.

== Teams ==
=== Stadiums and locations ===
Note: Table lists in alphabetical order.

Team	Location	Venue
Ampem Darkoa FC	Techiman	
Ashtown Ladies	Kumasi	
Fabulous Ladies	Kumasi	
Berry Ladies (Halifax Ladies)	Accra	
Hasaacas Ladies	Sekondi-Takoradi	
Immigration Ladies	Accra	
Kumasi Sports Academy	Kumasi	
Lady Strikers	Cape Coast	
Northern Ladies	Tamale	
Pearl Pia Ladies	Tamale	
Police Ladies	Accra	
Prison Ladies	Accra	
Sea Lions FC	Elmina	
Soccer Intellectuals	Winneba	
Supreme Ladies	Kumasi	
Thunder Queens FC	Kumasi	

=== Club managers and captains ===
Note: Table lists in alphabetical order.

Team	Manager	Captain
Ampem Darkoa FC	(Ghana) Joe Nana Adarkwa	(Ghana) Justice Tweneboaa
Ashtown Ladies	(Ghana) Alex Kamara	
Fabulous Ladies	(Ghana) Augustine Nana Atuahene	
Berry Ladies (Halifax Ladies)	(Ghana) Mercy Tagoe Quarcoo	
Hasaacas Ladies	(Ghana) Yusif Basigi	(Ghana) Janet Egyiri
Immigration Ladies	(Ghana) Joseph Badger	
Kumasi Sports Academy	(Ghana) Charles Anokye Frimpong	(Ghana) Naomi Anima
Lady Strikers	(Ghana) Rashid Iddi	(Ghana) Ellen Coleman
Northern Ladies	(Ghana) Sumani Bashirudeen	(Ghana) Jafar Rahama
Pearl Pia Ladies	(Ghana) Baba Nuhu	
Police Ladies	(Ghana) Franklin Oswald Sam	
Prison Ladies	(Ghana) Imoro Amadu	
Sea Lions FC	(Ghana) Richard Mensah	
Soccer Intellectuals Ladies	(Ghana) Ali Yakubu	(Ghana) Mary Essiful
Supreme Ladies	(Ghana) Joyce Boatey-Agyei	(Ghana) Sandra Owusu-Ansah
Thunder Queens FC	(Ghana) Edna Quagraine	

== League table ==
=== Northern Zone ===
Pos	Team	Pld	W	L	D	GF	GA	GD	Pts	
1	Ampem Darkoa Ladies	14	10	0	4	33	11	22	34	NZ Winner & Super Cup 2021
2	Kumasi Sports Academy Ladies	14	7	3	4	13	8	5	25	Super Cup 2021
3	Ashtown Ladies	14	7	5	2	18	21	−3	23	
4	Prison Ladies	14	4	6	4	9	10	-1	16	
5	Northern Ladies	14	4	4	6	21	18	3	15	
6	Pearl Pia Ladies	14	2	5	7	8	13	−3	13	
7	Supreme Ladies	14	3	8	3	20	26	−6	12	
8	Fabulous Ladies	14	2	8	4	13	30	−17	10	

Source: Ghana Football Association

=== Southern Zone ===
Pos	Team	Pld	W	L	D	GF	GA	GD	Pts	
1	Hasaacas Ladies	14	10	1	3	29	7	22	33	SZ Winner & Super Cup 2021
2	Halifax Soccer Academy Ladies	14	10	3	1	24	12	12	31	Super Cup 2021
3	Soccer Intellectuals Ladies	14	8	5	1	15	14	7	25	
4	Lady Strikers	14	7	5	2	26	22	4	23	
5	Police Ladies	14	6	5	3	19	16	3	21	
6	Thunder Queens	14	4	7	3	18	27	−9	15	
7	Immigration Ladies	14	2	10	2	10	27	−17	8	
8	Sea Lions	14	0	11	3	9	31	−22	3	

Source: Ghana Football Association

=== Championship final ===
26 June 2021
16:00

Ampem Darkoa Ladies	0–4	Hasaacas Ladies
		Nyame 11'; Badu 30'; Boaduwaa 70' 84'

Madina Astroturf, Madina, Ghana
Referee: Joyce Ohenewaa Appiah

== Statistics ==
=== Top scorers ===
Rank	Player	Club	Goals
1	(Ghana) Ophelia Serwaa Amponsah	Ampem Darkoa Ladies	17
2	Gladys Amfobea	Lady Strikers	11
3	Jafar Rahama	Northern Ladies	10
3	Sandra Owusu-Ansah	Supreme Ladies	10
4	(Ghana) Milot Abena Pokua	Hasaacas Ladies	9
4	(Ghana) Veronica Appiah	Hasaacas Ladies	9
5	(Ghana) Doris Boaduwaa	Hasaacas Ladies	8
6	(Ghana) Vivian Adjei Konadu	Thunder Queens	7
7	(Ghana) Suzzy Dede Teye	Lady Strikers	6
8	(Ghana) Adina M. Akpo	Soccer Intellectuals Ladies	5
8	(Ghana) Felicity Asante	Berry Ladies	5
8	(Ghana) Elizabeth Owusuaa	Sea Lions	5
8	(Ghana) Grace Animah	Police Ladies	5
8	(Ghana) Constance S. Agyemang	Berry Ladies	5
8	(Ghana) Tracy Twum	Ampem Darkoa Ladies	5
8	(Ghana) Fiddus Yakubu	Ashtown Ladies	5

The 1st goal of the season was scored by Nina Norshie (Berry Ladies).

The 100th goal of the season was scored by Victoria Salifu (Northern Ladies).

== Awards ==
=== Monthly awards ===
The monthly awards were sponsored by NASCO Ghana.

Month	NASCO Player of the Month		NASCO Manager of the Month		References
Month	Player	Club	Manager	Club	References
January	(Ghana) Felicity Asante	Berry Ladies	(Ghana) Mercy Tagoe Quarcoo	Berry Ladies	
February	(Ghana) Suzzy Dede Teye	Lady Strikers	(Ghana) Joe Nana Adarkwa	Ampem Darkoa Ladies	
April	(Ghana) Gladys Amfobea	Lady Strikers	(Ghana) Yusif Basigi	Hasaacas Ladies	
May	(Ghana) Ophelia Serwaa Amponsah	Ampem Darkoa Ladies	(Ghana) Charles Anokye Frimpong	Kumasi Sports Academy	

=== Annual awards ===
The annual awards were given during the championship final.

Award	Winner	Club
Top scorer of the season	(Ghana) Ophelia Serwaa Amponsah	Ampem Darkoa Ladies
Player of the season	(Ghana) Constance Serwah Agyemang	Berry Ladies
Defender of the season	(Ghana) Janet Egyiri	Hasaacas Ladies
Goalkeeper of the season	(Ghana) Grace Banwa	Hasaacas Ladies
Discovery of the season	(Ghana) Comfort Yeboah	Ampem Darkoa Ladies
Coach of the season	(Ghana) Yusif Basigi	Hasaacas Ladies

== See also ==
- Ghana Women’s Premier League
- 2020–21 Ghana Premier League
- 2021 Ghana Women's FA Cup
