= Blessing Agbomadzi =

Ghanaian footballer (born 2001)

Personal information
- Full name: Blessing Shine Agbomadzi
- Date of birth: 11 June 2001 (age 25)
- Position: Defender

Team information
- Current team: AS FAR

Senior career*
Years	Team	Apps	(Gls)
- AS FAR

International career
- Ghana U17
- Ghana U20
- Ghana
- * Club domestic league appearances and goals

Blessing Shine Agbomadzi (born 11 June 2001) is a Ghanaian professional footballer who plays as a defender for Moroccan Women's Championship club AS FAR and the Ghana women's national team. She also represented Ghana at youth international level.

== Club career ==
Agbomadzi started her career with Kumasi Sports Academy Ladies before joining Sea Lions. She played for Sea Lions in the Ghana Women's Premier League. In October 2020, she joined Israeli top-flight side, Hapoel Be'er Sheva on a two-year deal. Her time at Hapoel Be'er Sheva was cut short abruptly as it lasted only a season, due to the conflict between Israel and Palestine which spanned for months.

Agbomadzi returned to Ghana and subsequently joined Hasaacas Ladies ahead of the maiden CAF Women's Champions League. She played in all matches and formed a strong centre-back partnership with Janet Egyir, helping Hasaacas Ladies to reach the final of the 2021 CAF Women's Champions League. They however lost to Mamelodi Sundowns Ladies by 2–0 in the 2021 CAF Women's Champions League final. In her only season (2021–22 season) with Hasaacas, she played in 17 out of 19 league matches with Hasaacas finishing the season as Southern Zone Champions but losing the championship final to Ampem Darkoa Ladies. She was nominated for the Defender of the Year award.

In September 2022, Agbomadzi joined the Moroccan Women's Championship club AS FAR on a two-year contract. In her first season with the club, she won the 2022 CAF Women's Champions League where she played in all matches, including the final which AS FAR won by 4–0 against defending champions Mamelodi Sundowns Ladies. The following season, she won a double, winning the Moroccan Women's Championship and Moroccan Women Throne Cup trophies. She also helped AS FAR to win third place in the 2023 CAF Women's Champions League defeating Ampem Darkoa Ladies by 2–0. As a result, she became the first player to win all three medals in the CAF Women's Champions League.

== International career ==
Agbomadzi played for the Ghana U-17 women's team, the Black Maidens. In 2016, she was a member of the team that played at the 2016 FIFA U-17 Women's World Cup, where they reached the quarter-finals. She played alongside Sandra Owusu-Ansah, Nina Norshie and Vivian Adjei.

In 2018, Agbomadzi was a member of the Ghana U-20 women's team, the Black Princesses and was part of the squad that played at the 2018 FIFA U-20 Women's World Cup coached by Yusif Basigi. In August 2020, she was also part of the 31 players who were invited to the Black Princesses camp ahead of the 2020 FIFA U-20 World Cup qualifying matches. In late October 2020, FIFA announced that the 2020 edition of the tournament had been cancelled.

== Honours ==
Hasaacas Ladies

- CAF Women's Champions League runner-up: 2021
- Ghana Women's Super Cup: 2021
- First Lady's Cup: 2021

AS FAR

- CAF Women's Champions League: 2022
- Moroccan Women's Championship: 2022–23
- Moroccan Women Throne Cup: 2023

Individual

- Ghana Football Awards Women's Footballer of the Year: 2023
