= 2022 CAF Awards =

- Date: 21 July 2022
- Location: Rabat
- Country: Morocco
- Presented by: CAF

Highlights
- African Footballer of the Year: Men's: Women's:
- Website: cafonline.com

The 2022 CAF Awards was held on 21 July 2022 at Mohammed VI Technical Centre in Rabat, the capital city of Morocco.

== Player of the Year (Men) ==
The shortlist nominees for the award were announced on 11 July 2022.

Rank	Player	Club(s)	Points
1st	(Senegal) Sadio Mané	(England) Liverpool (Germany) Bayern Munich	
2nd	(Egypt) Mohamed Salah	(England) Liverpool	
3rd	(Senegal) Édouard Mendy	(England) Chelsea	
	(Algeria) Riyad Mahrez	(England) Manchester City	
	(Cameroon) Karl Toko Ekambi	(France) Lyon	
	(Cameroon) Vincent Aboubakar	(Saudi Arabia) Al Nassr	
	(Ivory Coast) Sébastien Haller	(Netherlands) Ajax	
	(Guinea) Naby Keïta	(England) Liverpool	
	(Morocco) Achraf Hakimi	(France) Paris Saint-Germain	
	(Senegal) Kalidou Koulibaly	(Italy) Napoli (England) Chelsea	

== Player of the Year (Women) ==
The shortlist nominees for the award were announced on 14 July 2022.

Rank	Player	Club(s)	Points
	(Cameroon) Ajara Nchout	(Italy) Inter Milan	
	(Ghana) Evelyn Badu	(Norway) Alvaldsnes	
	(Ghana) Doris Boaduwaa	(Ghana) Hasaacas	
	(Morocco) Ghizlane Chebbak	(Morocco) AS FAR	
	(Nigeria) Asisat Oshoala	(Spain) Barcelona	
	(South Africa) Andile Dlamini	(South Africa) Mamelodi Sundowns	
	(South Africa) Bambanani Mbane	(South Africa) Mamelodi Sundowns	
	(South Africa) Thembi Kgatlana	(Spain) Atlético Madrid (United States) Racing Louisville	
	(South Africa) Refiloe Jane	(Italy) A.C. Milan	
	(Zambia) Grace Chanda	(Kazakhstan) BIIK Kazygurt	

== Interclub Player of the Year (Men) ==
Rank	Player	Club(s)	Points
	(Brazil) Tiago Azulão	(Angola) Atlético Petróleos de Luanda	
	(Ivory Coast) Karim Konate	(Ivory Coast) ASEC Mimosas	
	(Mali) Aliou Dieng	(Egypt) Al Ahly	
	(Tunisia) Ali Maâloul	(Egypt) Al Ahly	
	(South Africa) Percy Tau	(Egypt) Al Ahly	
	(Egypt) Mohamed Sherif	(Egypt) Al Ahly	
	(Egypt) Mohamed El Shenawy	(Egypt) Al Ahly	
	(Morocco) Achraf Dari	(Morocco) Wydad AC	
	(Morocco) Yahya Jabrane	(Morocco) Wydad AC	
	(Morocco) Zouhair El Moutaraji	(Morocco) Wydad AC	

== Interclub Player of the Year (Women) ==
Rank	Player	Club(s)	Points
	(South Africa) Andile Dlamini	(South Africa) Mamelodi Sundowns	
	(South Africa) Bambanani Mbane	(South Africa) Mamelodi Sundowns	
	(South Africa) Andisiwe Mgcoyi	(South Africa) Mamelodi Sundowns	
	(Ghana) Evelyn Badu	(Norway) Alvaldsnes	
	(Ghana) Doris Boaduwaa	(Ghana) Hasaacas	
	(Morocco) Ghizlane Chebbak	(Morocco) AS FAR	
	(Morocco) Sanaâ Mssoudy	(Morocco) AS FAR	
	(Morocco) Fatima Tagnaout	(Morocco) AS FAR	
	(Cameroon) Rose Bella	(Equatorial Guinea) Malabo Kings	
	(Nigeria) Gift Monday	(Nigeria) Rivers Angels (Nigeria) FC Robo	

== Young Player of the Year (Men) ==
Rank	Player	Club(s)	Points
	(Burkina Faso) Dango Ouattara	(France) Lorient	
	(Ivory Coast) Karim Konaté	(Ivory Coast) ASEC Mimosas (Austria) Red Bull Salzburg	
	(Ghana) Kamaldeen Sulemana	(France) Rennes	
	(Senegal) Pape Matar Sarr	(France) Metz	
	(Tunisia) Hannibal Mejbri	(England) Manchester United	

== Young Player of the Year (Women) ==
Rank	Player	Club(s)	Points
	(Ghana) Evelyn Badu	(Norway) Alvaldsnes	
	(Ghana) Doris Boaduwaa	(Ghana) Hasaacas	
	(Morocco) Yasmine Zouhir	(France) Saint-Étienne	
	(Nigeria) Gift Monday	(Nigeria) Rivers Angels (Nigeria) FC Robo	
	(Nigeria) Flourish Sebastine	(Nigeria) Bayelsa Queens	

== Coach of the Year (Men) ==
Rank	Coach	Team(s) managed	Points
	(Portugal) Carlos Queiroz	Egypt	
	(South Africa) Pitso Mosimane	(Egypt) Al Ahly	
	(Belgium) Tom Saintfiet	Gambia	
	(Morocco) Walid Regragui	Morocco	
	(Senegal) Aliou Cissé	Senegal	

== Coach of the Year (Women) ==
Rank	Coach	Team(s) managed	Points
	(Botswana) Gaoletlhoo Nkutlwisang	Botswana	
	(Cameroon) Gabriel Zabo	Cameroon	
	(Ghana) Yusif Basigi	(Ghana) Hasaacas	
	(France) Reynald Pedros	Morocco	
	(United States) Randy Waldrum	Nigeria	
	(Senegal) Serigne Amar Mousse Niang Cisse	Senegal	
	(South Africa) Desiree Ellis	South Africa	
	(South Africa) Jerry Tshabalala	(South Africa) Mamelodi Sundowns	
	(Tunisia) Samir Landolsi	Tunisia	
	(Zambia) Bruce Mwape	Zambia	

== National Team of the Year (Men) ==
Rank	National team	Points
	Burkina Faso	
	Cameroon	
	Egypt	
	Morocco	
	Senegal	

== National Team of the Year (Women) ==
South Africa

== Club of the Year (Men) ==
Rank	Club	Points
	(Angola) Petro de Luanda	
	(Egypt) Al Ahly	
	(Morocco) RS Berkane	
	(Morocco) Wydad AC	
	(South Africa) Orlando Pirates	

== Club of the Year (Women) ==
Rank	Club	Points
	(South Africa) Mamelodi Sundowns	
	(Ghana) Hasaacas	
	(Morocco) AS FAR	
	(Equatorial Guinea) Malabo Kings	
	(Nigeria) Rivers Angels	
