= Azumah Bugre =

Ghanaian footballer (born 2002)

Personal information
- Date of birth: 15 December 2002 (age 23)
- Place of birth: Ghana
- Height: 1.67 m (5 ft 6 in)
- Position: Midfielder

Senior career*
Years	Team	Apps	(Gls)
2016–2021	Police Ladies		
2021–2022	Hasaacas Ladies		
2022–2023	IFK Norrköping	26	(0)
2025	Fenerbahçe	2	(0)
2026	AEK Athens	0	(0)

International career^{‡}
2018	Ghana U17	4	(0)
2022	Ghana U20	3	(0)
2023–	Ghana	1	(0)
- * Club domestic league appearances and goals as of 8 September 2026 ‡ National team caps and goals as of 19 February 2023

Azumah Bugre (born 15 December 2002) is a free agent Ghanaian women's football midfielder who plays for the Ghana women's national team.

== Personal life ==
Azumah Bugre was born in Ghana on 15 December 2002. She has four siblings.

She grew up in northern Ghana and joined the Air Force.

== Club career ==
Bugre is nicknamed "Zum-Zum". In 2022, she signed for Swedish side IFK Norrköping. Previously, she played for Ghanaian side Hasaacas Ladies, where she was regarded as an important player for the club as they achieved second place at the 2021 CAF Women's Champions League.

In January 2025, she moved to Turkey, and joined the Istanbul-based club Fenerbahçe to play in the second half of the 2024–25 Super League season. She recorded only two appearances during her time with the club.

In the summer of 2026, Bugre signed a contract with the Greek A Division club AEK Athens. Bugre was released by the club on 8 September 2026 after failing to follow the pre-season programme and integrate smoothly with her teammates.

== International career ==
Bugre was regarded as an important player for the Ghana women's national under-20 football team as they achieved qualification for the U-20 Women's World Cup. In 2023, she debuted for the Ghana women's national football team.

== Style of play ==
Bugre mainly operates as a midfielder and can also operate as a defender.
