= Sonia Opoku =

Ghanaian footballer (born 2001)

Personal information
- Date of birth: 25 December 2001 (age 24)
- Place of birth: Ghana
- Position: Midfielder

Team information
- Current team: Kickstart FC Karnataka
- Number: 8

Senior career*
Years	Team	Apps	(Gls)
2014–2022	Ampem Darkoa Ladies		
2022	Trabzonspor	8	(4)
2022–2023	1207 Antalya Spor	18	(8)
2023–	Misaka United		
2024-2025	Epiphany Warriors FC	12	(5)
2025	Asa Tel aviv WFC		

International career
2016–2017	Ghana U17		
- Ghana Black Queens
- * Club domestic league appearances and goals as of 2025

Sonia Opoku (born 25 December 2001) is a Ghanaian international footballer who plays as a midfielder for the Indian Women's League club Misaka United and the Ghana women's national team. She previously played for Ghanaian club Ampem Darkoa Ladies.

== Club career ==
Opoku started her career with Ampem Darkoa Ladies. In 2017, she suffered an injury that kept her out for close to two years until 2019 when she recovered fully . She returned to playing in 2020 during the 2020–21 Ghana Women's Premier League season. Opoku played a key role in her return by helping Ampem Darkoa to a first-place finish in the Northern Zone league and qualifying for the play-off final. Ampem Darko however lost the final to Hasaacas Ladies losing by 2–0. Opoku was adjudged the NASCO player of the match for her great performance even though her team lost.

In the Ghana Women's FA Cup, Opoku also played a key role in getting Ampem-Darkoa to do final by scoring the winning goal in their semi-final fixture against Thunder Queens. She scored the goal in the 92nd minute of extra time after the match remained goalless at full time. In the FA Cup final, Ampem Darkoa lost the final again to Hasaacas Ladies by 2–0. Opoku was however adjudged the player of the season.

By March 2022, she moved to Turkey and signed with Trabzonspor to play in the second half of the 2021–22 Turkish Women's Super League season. In the 2022–23 Turkish Women's Football Super League, she transferred to 1207 Antalya Spor.

On 5 April 2023, Opoku joined Indian Women's League club Misaka United as one of the foreign players.

== International career ==
Opoku was a member of the Ghana U-17 women's team from 2016 to 2018. En route to the 2016 FIFA U-17 Women's World Cup, she suffered an ACL injury during their final training camp session which ended her chances of featuring at the tournament. Due to the recurring nature of the injury she was kept out of featuring in the 2018 FIFA U-17 Women's World Cup after being part of the squad during the initial qualifiers.

Opoku earned her first senior national team call up in July 2021 ahead of the Aisha Buhari Cup and 2022 Africa Women Cup of Nations qualifiers against Nigeria. She made her international debut during an Aisha Buhari Cup friendly match against South African women's national team on 17 September 2021.

== Honours ==
Ampem Darkoa

- Ghana Women's Premier League: 2015–16, 2017, 2021–22
- Ghana Women's Super Cup: 2017

Individual

- Ghana Women's FA Cup Player of the Season: 2021
