= Regina Antwi =

Ghanaian footballer (born 1995)

Personal information
- Full name: Regina Antwi
- Date of birth: 26 November 1995 (age 30)
- Place of birth: Accra, Ghana
- Position: Defender

Senior career*
Years	Team	Apps	(Gls)
2010	Vodafone Ladies		
2012	Ghatel Ladies Accra		
2012–2019	Hasaacas Ladies		
2019–2020	Diósgyőri VTK women		
2020–2021	Hasaacas Ladies		
2021	1207 Antalya Spor	30	(0)
2024–2025	Sreebhumi		
2026	East Bengal	0	(0)

International career
2010–2012	Ghana U17	-	(-)
2013–2016	Ghana U20	-	(-)
2016–	Ghana	-	(-)
- * Club domestic league appearances and goals

Regina Antwi (born 26 November 1995) is a Ghanaian professional footballer who plays as a defender for the Ghana women's national football team. She represented Ghana at the U17 level at two World Cups in 2010 and 2012. She previously played for Hungarian club Diósgyőri VTK.

== Club career ==
Antwi started her career with Vodafone Ladies before joining Ghatel Ladies Accra. She later joined Hasaacas Ladies in 2012. She would go on to become an integral member of the squad and help the club to win the Ghana Women's Premier League on three consecutive occasions and the 2019 Ghana Women's Special Competition.

In 2019, she joined Hungarian side Diósgyőri VTK on a two-year deal. She played for the Női NB I for a season, before moving back to Ghana to rejoin her former club. She returned to Hasaacas ahead of the 2020–21 season which she helped the club in winning the treble, the league, the cup and the inaugural 2021 WAFU Zone B Tournament.

In 2021, Antwi transferred to 1207 Antalya Spor to play in the Turkish Women's Football Super League.

== International career ==
=== Youth ===
Antwi made her youth debut for Ghana at under-17 level in 2010. She went on to feature for Ghana at the 2010 FIFA U-17 Women's World Cup in Trinidad and Tobago.

After gaining experience in the 2010 edition, she was recalled in August 2012, for the 2012 FIFA U-17 Women's World Cup in Azerbaijan. She was one of the key players as the Ghana under-17 team finished in third place by beating Germany in the third place match. At the competition she played in all six games and played 90 minutes in all.

=== Senior ===
Antwi was part of the Ghana team that placed third at the 2016 Africa Women Cup of Nations.

== Honours ==
Hasaacas Ladies

- Ghana Women's Premier League (GWPL): 2012–13, 2013–14, 2014–15, 2020–21
- Ghana Women's Special Competition: 2019
- Ghana Women's FA Cup: 2021
- WAFU Zone B Tournament: 2021
- CAF Women's Champions League runner-up: 2021

Ghana U17

- FIFA U-17 Women's World Cup third place: 2012

Ghana

- Africa Women Cup of Nations third place: 2016
