= Nina Norshie =

Ghanaian association football player

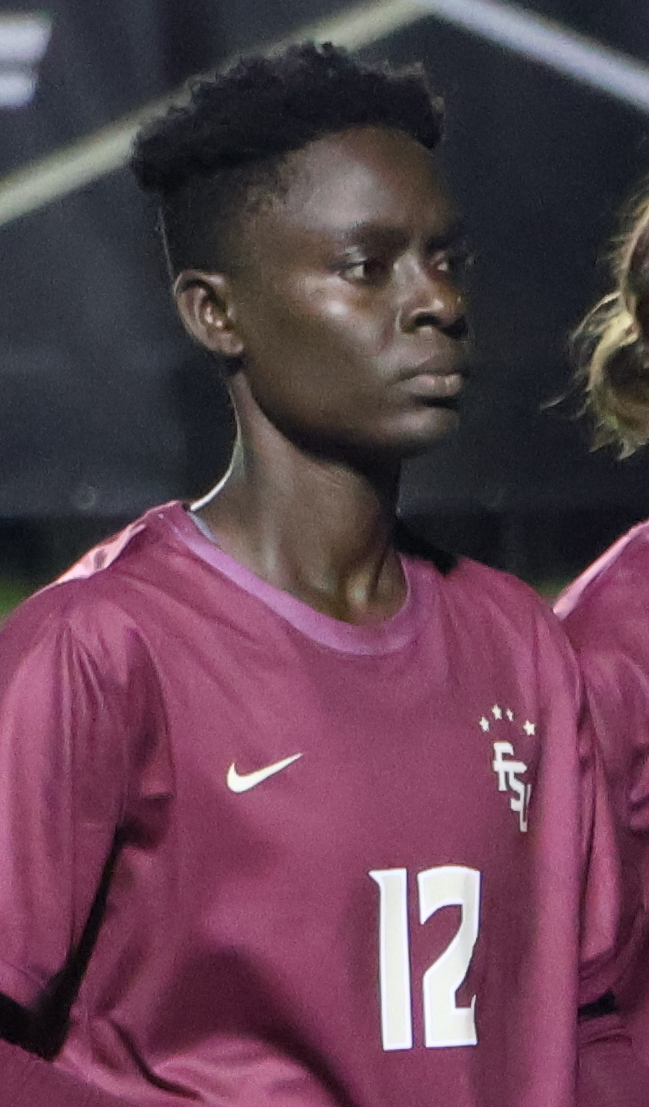
- Norshie with Florida State in 2024

Personal information
- Date of birth: 14 September 2001 (age 25)

Team information
- Current team: Florida State Seminoles
- Number: 12

College career
Years	Team	Apps	(Gls)
2024–	Florida State Seminoles		

Nina Norshie (born 14 September 2001) is a Ghanaian footballer who plays as a defender for the Florida State Seminoles and the Ghana national team.

== Club career ==
Norshie started her career with Valued Girls when she was part of the Ghana U17 squad between 2015 and 2019. In February 2019, Norshie and two other players from Valued Girls were signed by Nigerian club Edo Queens on a six months loan deal. She later left the club permanently and joined Ghana Women's Premier League side Berry Ladies in 2020. On 18 January 2021, she made her debut in a 3–2 victory against Immigration Ladies. She started, played the full 90 minutes and scored her debut goal which was the first goal of the 2020–21 Ghana Women's Premier League season. In May 2022, Norshie joined the KC Courage of the United Women's Soccer League. She started and played the full 90 minutes of the entire 2022 season. She was named to the United Women's Soccer All-Central Conference First Team and Iron Woman of the year (most minutes played).

== International career ==
Norshie capped for Ghana at both the U17 and U20 levels. At the U17 level, she represented Ghana at the 2016 FIFA U-17 Women's World Cup and 2018 FIFA U-17 Women's World Cup, in the process she played 4 matches in the latter. In the 2016 squad she played alongside Sandra Owusu-Ansah and Blessing Agbomadzi whilst playing alongside Mukarama Abdulai and Millot Pokuaa in 2018. She also served as the deputy captain for the U17 team. In August 2020, she was promoted to the U20 team being coached by Yusif Basigi. She earned a call-up into the team for 2020 FIFA U-20 World Cup qualifying matches and friendly matches against Morocco between August and October 2020.

Norshie earned her first senior national team call up in July 2021 ahead of the Aisha Buhari Cup and 2022 Africa Women Cup of Nations qualifiers against Nigeria. She made her international debut during an Aisha Buhari Cup friendly match against South African women's national team on 17 September 2021.
