= Nathalie Badate =

Togolese footballer

Personal information
- Date of birth: 28 August 1991 (age 35)
- Position: Midfielder

Team information
- Current team: Tarascon

Senior career*
Years	Team	Apps	(Gls)
- Amis du monde
2022–	Tarascon		

International career^{‡}
2021–	Togo	2	(0)
- * Club domestic league appearances and goals ‡ National team caps and goals as of 21 February 2022.

Nathalie Badate (born 28 August 1991) is a Togolese footballer who plays as a midfielder for French club FC Tarascon and captains the Togo women's national team.

== Career ==
Nathalie captained the Togolese women's national team to their first ever qualification for the African Cup of Nations AFCON in 2022 which took place in Morocco
