= Gifty Oware-Mensah =

Ghanaian politician

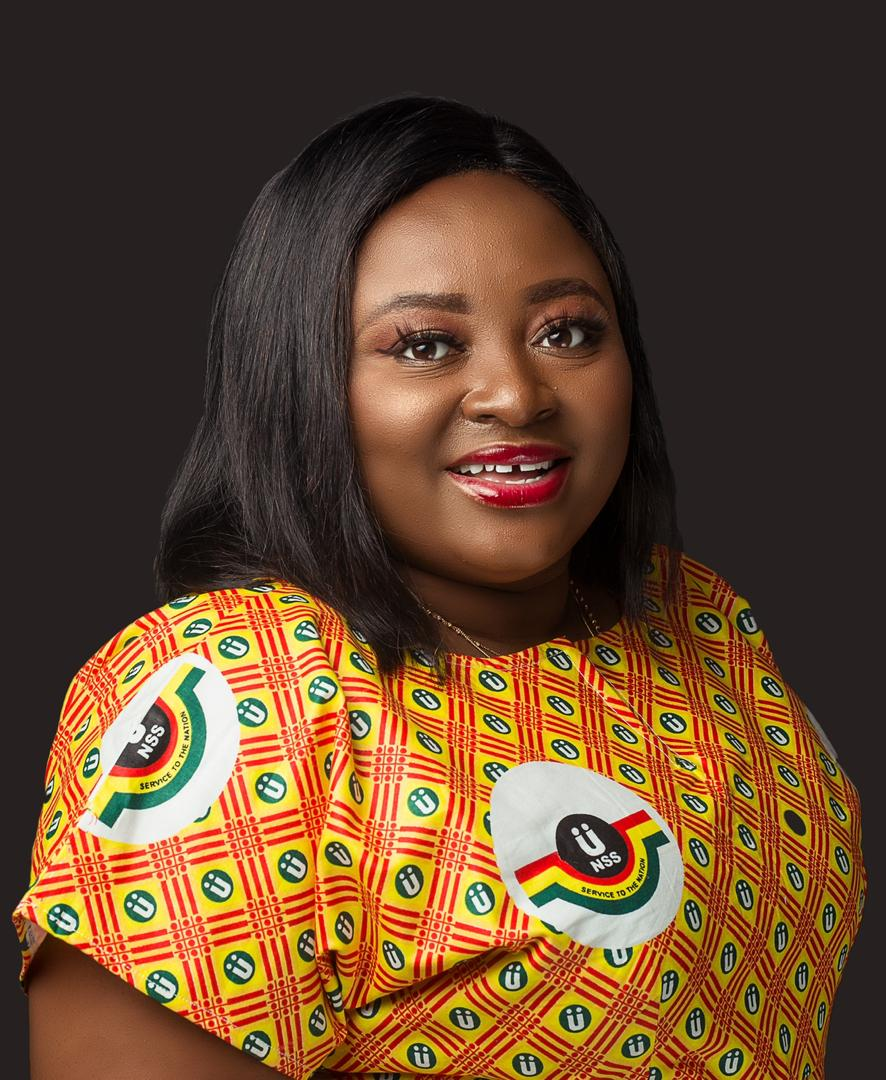

Deputy Executive Director of the National Service Scheme
- In office March 2017 – January 2025

Personal details
- Born: Gifty Oware-Aboagye; 4 July 1986 (age 40) Koforidua Eastern Region, Ghana
- Party: New Patriotic Party
- Education: Ghana Secondary School; Kwame Nkrumah University of Science and Technology; University of South Africa

Gifty Oware-Mensah (born 4 July 1986) is a Ghanaian politician and former deputy executive director of the National Service Scheme in Ghana. She had responsibility for administration and finance, helping to manage an annual personnel pool of about 100,000.

== Early life and education ==
Gifty Oware-Aboagye was born to Isaac Oware-Aboagye, a Development Worker, and Kate Donkor, a textile trader in Koforidua in the Eastern Region of Ghana on 4 July 1986. Aboagye lived and had her early education in Koforidua. She had her secondary education at the Ghana Secondary School before proceeding to the KNUST where she studied for a Bachelor of Arts Degree in History.

She also holds a postgraduate certificate in Management of Democratic Elections in Africa (MDeA) from the University of South Africa. She holds an MSc. Defense and International Politics at the Ghana Armed Forces Command and Staff College (GAFCSC).

Oware-Aboagye has Executive Development Certificate, Women in Leadership from Stellenbosch University and an executive Education in Digital Marketing from Yale University

== Career ==
Oware-Aboagye began her career as the events and marketing manager for Reflects Marketing Plus in Accra from 2011 to 2014. In 2014 she joined the Danquah Institute, a political think-thank named after J. B. Danquah. Prior to her appointment as the deputy director of the National Service Scheme, she was the director of research and media relations at the institute. She also consults as financial and investment analyst for Oware Fruit Juice company.

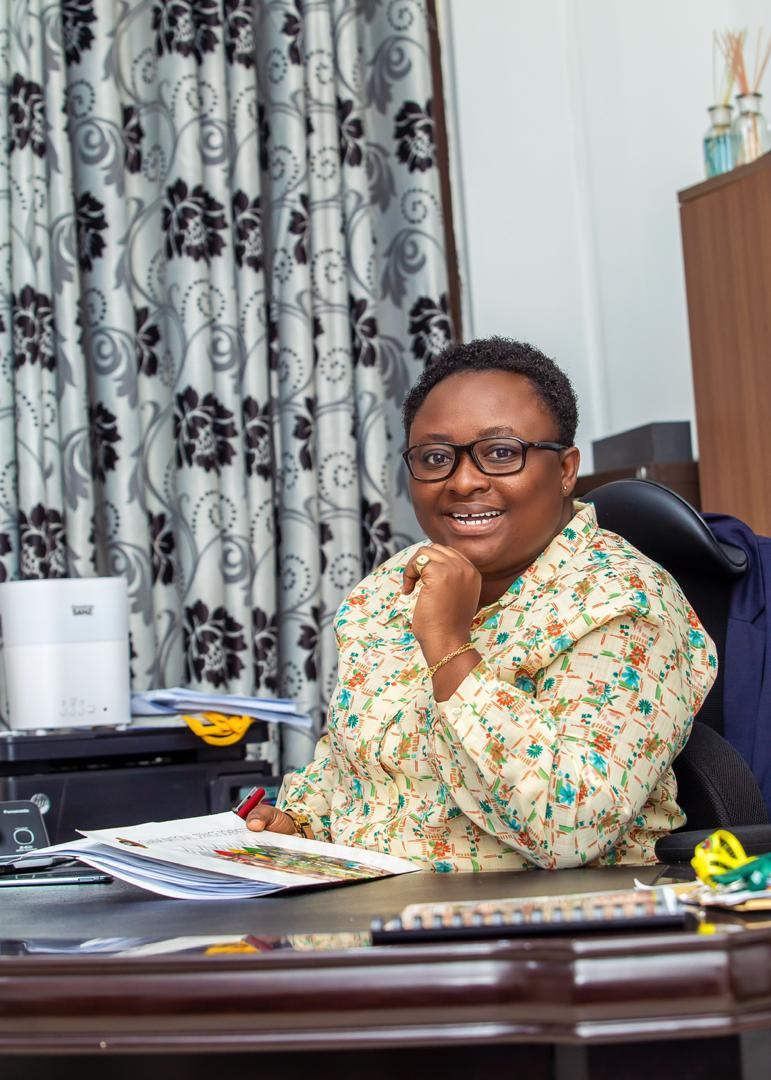
Gifty Oware-Aboagye

=== Football administration ===
She is vice president of Berekum Chelsea FC and co-owner of Berry Ladies Football club (formerly Halifax Ladies), a women's premier league team in Ghana. She is currently a member of the Ghana Football Association's management committee for the Black Maidens (Under-17 female football level).

She was appointed as the vice-chairperson for the Women's Premier League Super Cup's Local Organising Committee (LOC). she serve as an Executive Council Member of Ghana football Association, ocuppying the Women`s football slot

== Politics ==
Oware-Aboagye began active politics at KNUST where she was an active member of TESCON; the student wing of the New Patriotic Party (NPP) and later an Executive Member. She was at the forefront of student leadership at KNUST and rose from Line President of the Independence Hall to become the first female to contest for the Presidency of the Social Science Faculty.

In March 2010, she was appointed as the Under-Secretary-General for Political Affairs at the First Session of Ghana International Model of The United Nations. In 2011 she became a member of the communications team of the New Patriotic Party.^{[1]} She was also a senior member of the political pressure group, Let My Vote Count Alliance. Oware-Aboagye contested for the National Youth Organizer for the NPP in 2014 but failed to win the seat.^{[2]}

== Scandals ==
Oware-Aboagye has been implicated in a major scandal at the National Service Secretariat, allegedly costing the Ghanaian public billions of Ghana cedis. According to the Ghanaian investigative journalism outlet The Fourth Estate, Aboagye and her leadership team at the NSS reportedly inflated the database with hundreds of thousands of ghost names, diverting funds for personal gain. She is under investigation by the Special Prosecutor of the Republic of Ghana.

She was charged by Ghana's Office of the Attorney-General in connection with an alleged corruption scandal involving the National Service Authority (NSA). She faces multiple charges, including stealing, willfully causing financial loss to the state, using public office for profit, and money laundering.

Irregular NSS enrollment: A recent forensic audit by the Auditor-General uncovered that, on March 16, 2021, Oware-Mensah was manually and illegally enrolled in the NSS system using her master's degree from KNUST and paid as a national service personnel, receiving monthly allowances despite already serving as a full-time, salaried public official at the time. She received a full year's allowance totaling GH¢6,708.48 (GH¢559.04 per month), which was deducted and paid to a vendor platform to finance a personal credit facility. The case is currently being prosecuted as part of the government's Operation Recover All Loot (ORAL) initiative.

Bail conditions: In late October 2025, High Court judge Justice Audrey Kocuvi-Tay granted Oware-Mensah bail set at GH¢10 million with three sureties.

== Awards and recognition ==
Oware-Aboagye is a recipient of an honorary PhD in Sociology and Social Work by the Day Spring Christian University College Lauredale Florida for her dedication to social activism and efforts aimed at changing society for the better.

Nominated for best club CEO of the season.

== Personal life ==
Gifty is married to her longtime friend Peter Mensah an Accra-based legal practitioner.
