= Justice Tweneboaa =

Ghanaian footballer

Justice Tweneboaa (born 28 October 2001) is a Ghanaian footballer who plays as a defender for Ampem Darkoaa whom she also captains and the Ghana women's national team.

== Club career ==
Tweneboaa started her career with Ghana Women’s Premier League side Ampem Darkoa. In 2020, ahead of the 2020–21 season, she was appointed as the team captain.

== International career ==
=== Youth ===
Tweneboaa has capped for Ghana at the U17, U20 and senior level. At the U17 level, she represented Ghana at the 2018 FIFA U-17 Women's World Cup, where she played 4 matches as Ghana were eliminated by Mexico in the quarter-finals via a penalty shootout. She was one of the two who missed their penalties. At that World Cup she played alongside players like Mukarama Abdulai and Nina Norshie.

That same year, Tweneboaa had been called to U20 team at the age of 16 by Yusif Basigi in July 2018 and was called up for the 2018 FIFA U-20 Women's World Cup where she played in all the group matches. In June 2020, she was called up into team as one of the senior players for their 2020 FIFA U-20 World Cup qualifying matches and friendly matches against Morocco between August and October 2020.

=== Senior ===
In March 2018, she got her first senior national team call up ahead of a friendly match against Japan. She made her debut on 1 April 2018 at the age of 16 in the friendly match against Japan which Ghana lost by 7–1. In July 2021, Tweneboaa made the squad for the Aisha Buhari Cup and 2022 Africa Women Cup of Nations qualifiers against Nigeria. This came after her impressive performances in the league which led Ampem Darkoa to 2nd place in the league. She made her international debut during an Aisha Buhari Cup friendly match against South African women's national team on 17 September 2021.
