= Evelyn Badu =

Ghanaian footballer (born 2002)

Personal information
- Date of birth: 11 September 2002 (age 24)
- Place of birth: Seikwa, Ghana
- Height: 1.66 m (5 ft 5 in)
- Positions: Forward; midfielder

Team information
- Current team: Montreal Roses FC
- Number: 13

Senior career*
Years	Team	Apps	(Gls)
- Hasaacas Ladies
2022–2024	Avaldsnes IL	47	(3)
2024–2025	Fleury	13	(1)
2025–2026	Molde	0+	(0+)
2026–	Montreal Roses FC	0	(0)

International career^{‡}
2019–	Ghana		
- * Club domestic league appearances and goals as of 26 March 2025 ‡ National team caps and goals as of 8 October 2019

Evelyn Badu (born 11 September 2002) is a Ghanaian professional footballer who plays as a forward for Montreal Roses FC and the Ghana national team.

She previously played for Norwegian club Avaldsnes IL and French club FC Fleury 91.

== Club career ==
Badu has played for Hasaacas Ladies in Ghana, appearing at the 2021 CAF Women's Champions League final tournament in which she scored 5 goals and won the Golden Boot award. She moved to Norwegian club Avaldsnes IL for the 2022 season.

In March 2024, French club FC Fleury 91 announced the signing of Badu midway into the 2023–24 season.

On 26 March 2025, Norwegian 1. divisjon club Molde FK announced that they had signed Badu to a one-year contract.

On 28 January 2026, Badu was announced at Montreal Roses FC.

== International career ==
Badu was part of the Ghana squad that competed in the 2018 FIFA U-20 Women's World Cup, but she did not play any matches. She capped at senior level during the 2020 CAF Women's Olympic Qualifying Tournament (third round).

Badu was part of the Ghanaian team which finished third at the 2024 Women's Africa Cup of Nations.

== International goals ==
Scores and results list Ghana's goal tally first.

No.	Date	Venue	Opponent	Score	Result	Competition
1.	8 May 2019	Stade Robert Champroux, Abidjan, Ivory Coast	Senegal	1–0	3–0	2019 WAFU Zone B Women's Cup
2.	19 February 2023	Stade de l'Amitié, Cotonou, Benin	Benin	1–0	3–0	Friendly
3.	11 April 2023	Accra Sports Stadium, Accra, Ghana	Senegal	1–0	1–0	Friendly
4.	14 July 2023	General Lansana Conté Stadium, Conakry, Guinea	Guinea	3–0	3–0	2024 CAF Women's Olympic Qualifying Tournament
5.	18 July 2023	Accra Sports Stadium, Accra, Ghana	Guinea	1–0	4–0	2024 CAF Women's Olympic Qualifying Tournament
6.	18 July 2023	Accra Sports Stadium, Accra, Ghana	Guinea	3–0	4–0	2024 CAF Women's Olympic Qualifying Tournament
7.	20 September 2023	Kigali Pelé Stadium, Kigali, Rwanda	Rwanda	2–0	7–0	2024 Women's Africa Cup of Nations qualification
8.	20 September 2023	Kigali Pelé Stadium, Kigali, Rwanda	Rwanda	5–0	7–0	2024 Women's Africa Cup of Nations qualification
9.	26 September 2023	Accra Sports Stadium, Accra, Ghana	Rwanda	4–0	5–0	2024 Women's Africa Cup of Nations qualification
10.	31 October 2023	Accra Sports Stadium, Accra, Ghana	Benin	1–0	2–0	2024 CAF Women's Olympic qualifying tournament
11.	5 April 2024	Stade Lat-Dior, Thiès, Senegal	Senegal	1–0	1–0	Friendly
12.	14 July 2025	Berkane Stadium, Berkane, Morocco	Tanzania	3–1	4–1	2024 Women's Africa Cup of Nations
13.	6 August 2026	Moulay Rachid Stadium, Casablanca, Morocco	Mali	1–0	1–0	2026 Women's Africa Cup of Nations
14.	13 October 2026	Accra Sports Stadium, Accra, Ghana	Mauritius	1–0	7–0	2028 CAF Women's Olympic qualifying tournament

== Honours ==
Hasaacas Ladies

- Ghana Women's Premier League (GWPL): 2020–21
- Ghana Women's Special Competition: 2019
- Ghana Women's FA Cup: 2021
- WAFU Zone B Tournament: 2021
- CAF Women's Champions League runner-up: 2021

Individual

- CAF Women's Champions League top scorer: 2021
- CAF Women's Champions League Player of the group stage: 2021
- CAF Women's Champions League Player of the Tournament: 2021
- Entertainment Achievement Awards Sportswoman of the Year: 2022
- CAF Awards Interclub Player of the Year: 2022
- CAF Awards Young Player of the Year: 2022
- Avaldsnes IL Best Player of the Season: 2023
- Avaldsnes IL Players’ Player Award: 2023
