= University of South Africa =

Largest public university in South Africa

- Former name: University of the Cape of Good Hope
- Motto: Pro Gentibus Sapientia (Latin)
- Motto in English: In the service of humanity
- Type: Public; Distance education Mega University
- Established: 1873; 153 years ago
- Affiliations: AAU; ACU; HESA
- Endowment: R22 billion
- Chancellor: Thabo Mbeki
- Vice-chancellor: Puleng LenkaBula
- Administrative staff: 6,218 (as of 2015)
- Students: 420,000 (as of 2019)
- Location: Pretoria, Gauteng, South Africa; 25°46′02″S 28°11′58″E
- Campus: Urban
- Colours: Maroon, Navy and White
- Nickname: UNISA
- Website: unisa.ac.za

The University of South Africa (UNISA) (Note: Afrikaans: Universiteit van Suid-Afrika, Zulu: Inyuvesi yaseNingizimu Afrika, Xhosa: IYunivesithi yoMzantsi Afrika, Tswana: Yunibesithi ya Aforika Borwa, Swazi: INyuvesi yase Ningizimu Afrika, Venda: Yunivesithi ya Afurika Tshipembe) is the largest university system in South Africa by enrollment. It attracts a third of all higher education students in South Africa. Through various colleges and affiliates, UNISA has over 400,000 students, including international students from 130 countries worldwide, making it one of the world's mega universities and the only such university in Africa. It is the only higher education institution to carry the name of the country in South Africa. It is the first tertiary institution in Africa to own an airport.

As a comprehensive university, Unisa offers both vocational and academic programmes, many of which have received international accreditation. It also has an extensive geographical footprint, providing its students with recognition and employability in many countries around the world. The university lists many notable South Africans among its alumni, including two Nobel Prize winners: Nelson Mandela, the first democratically elected president of South Africa, and Archbishop Desmond Tutu. It is the first tertiary institution in Africa to own an airport.

Founded in 1873 as the University of the Cape of Good Hope, the University of South Africa (commonly known as Unisa) spent most of its early history as an examining agency for Oxford and Cambridge universities, and as an incubator from which most other universities in South Africa are descended. Legislation in 1916 established the autonomous University of South Africa (the same legislation also established Stellenbosch University and the University of Cape Town as autonomous universities) as an "umbrella" or federal institution, with its seat in Pretoria, playing an academic trusteeship role for several colleges that eventually became autonomous universities. The colleges that were under UNISA's trusteeship were Grey University College (Bloemfontein), Huguenot University College (Wellington), Natal University College (Pietermaritzburg), Rhodes University College (Grahamstown), Transvaal University College (Pretoria), the South African School of Mines and Technology (Johannesburg), and Potchefstroom University College. In 1959, with the passage of the Extension of University Education Act, UNISA's trusteeship also extended to the five "black universities", namely University of Zululand, University of the Western Cape, University of the North, University of Durban-Westville, and University of Fort Hare. In 1946, UNISA was given a new role as a distance education university, and today it offers certificate, diploma, and degree courses up to doctoral level.

In January 2004, UNISA merged with Technikon Southern Africa (Technikon SA, a polytechnic) and incorporated the distance education component of Vista University (VUDEC). The combined institution retained the name University of South Africa. It is now organised by college and by school; see below.

== Campus ==
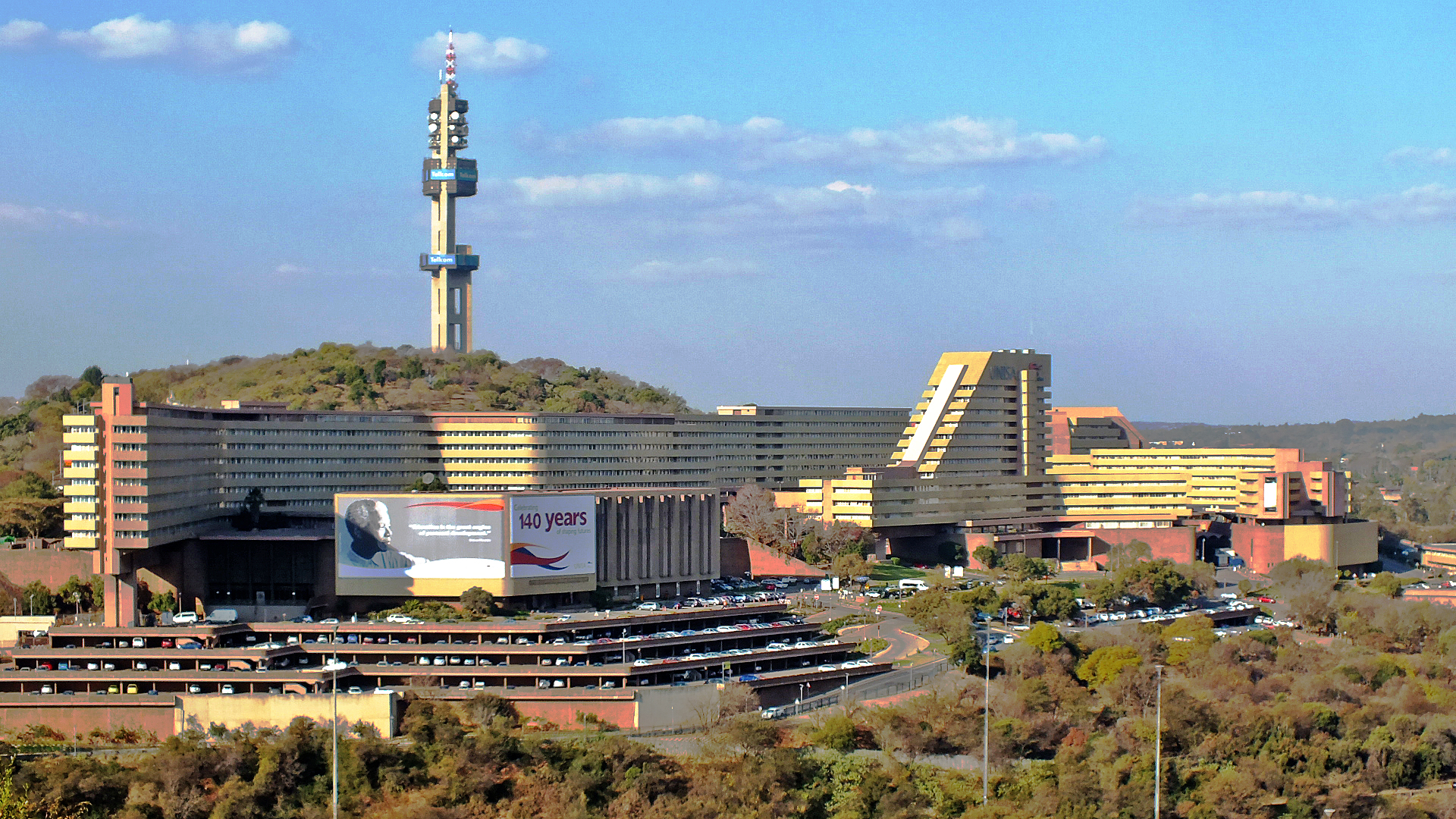
The university campus in Pretoria

=== Location ===
Unisa's Muckleneuk Campus is located in Pretoria and is a major landmark of the capital city. It was in 1972 that Unisa moved into its new home on Muckleneuk Ridge having vacated the old quarters in central Pretoria. The complex of buildings was designed by Bryan Sandrock Architects in the 1960s and expresses an international style characterised by monumental proportions and engineering feats like the cantilevered structures. The most striking feature is the long projection from the brow of the hill, supported by a giant steel girder resting on a massive column.

Panorama View of Unisa (Main Campus)

Also in Pretoria is the Sunnyside campus, the main area of student activity. The Florida campus in Johannesburg is Unisa's science campus. The College of Agriculture and Environmental Sciences and some departments of the College of Science, Engineering and Technology are housed here. The science campus contains 12 buildings, a library, two auditoriums and a large study area. It also includes a horticultural centre and a multipurpose research and training facility designed to meet the education and research needs of students in a range of programmes including agriculture, ornamental horticulture and nature conservation. Aside from in-person campuses, the University of South Africa also offers correspondence learning, extending their institution beyond brick-and-mortar locations.

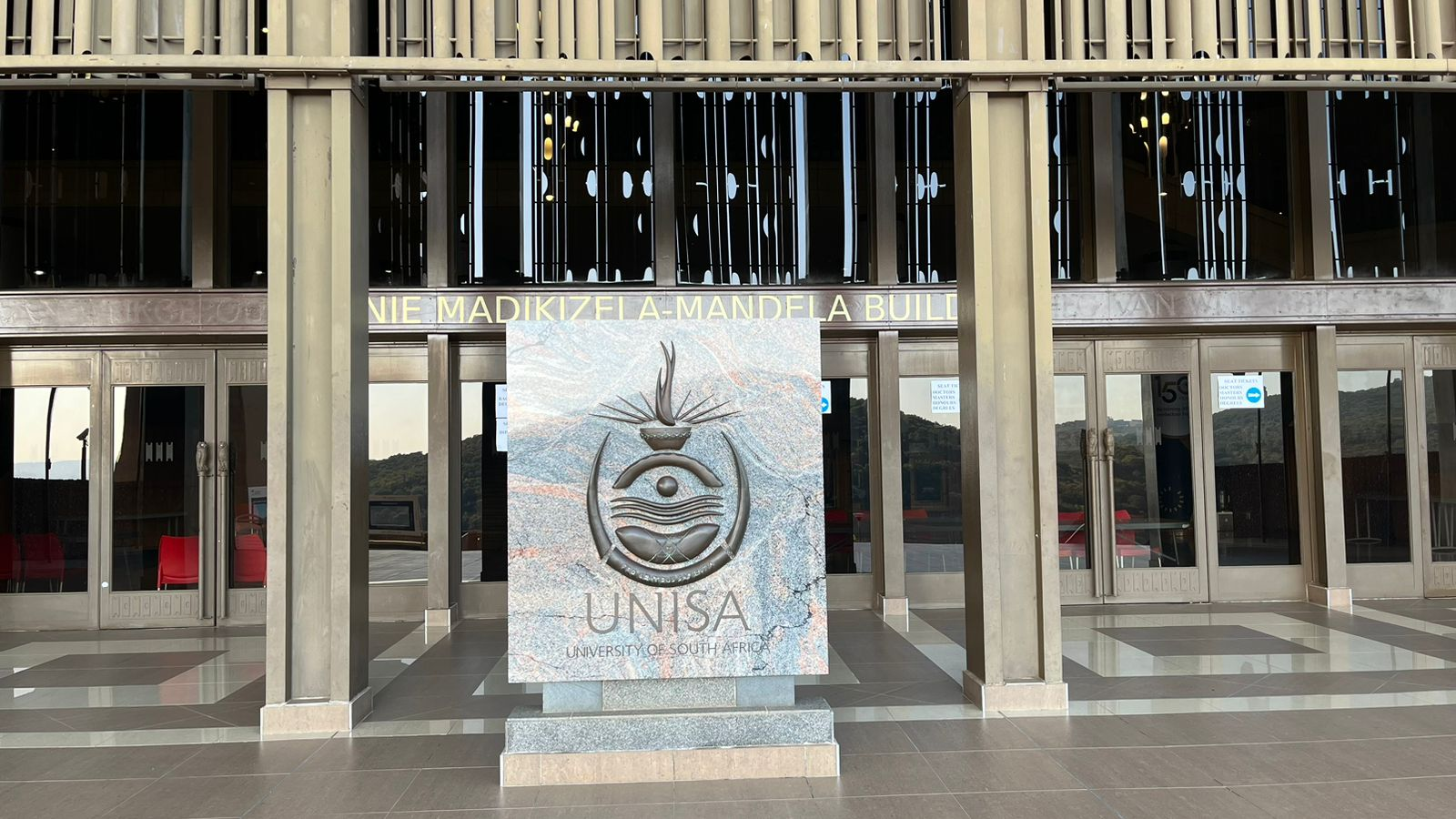
Winnie Madikizela-Mandela Building

The university has seven regional centres in South Africa, servicing students in all nine provinces. These are:

- Eastern Cape (East London, Mthatha, Port Elizabeth)
- Free State (Bloemfontein, Kroonstad)
- Gauteng (Ekurhuleni, Florida, Johannesburg, Pretoria, Vaal Triangle)
- Kwazulu-Natal (Durban, Newcastle, Pietermaritzburg, Richards Bay, Wild Coast Region)
- Limpopo Province (Giyani, Makhado, Polokwane)
- Northern Cape (Kimberley)
- North West (Mafikeng, Potchefstroom, Rustenburg)
- Mpumalanga (Middelburg, Nelspruit)
- Western Cape (Cape Town, George)

=== Students and staff ===
According to data extracted from the final audited Higher Education Management information system (HEMIS) submissions to the Department of Higher Education and Training (DHET), Unisa had 355,240 students enrolled in 2013 from South Africa, Africa, and other international states. The largest portion of these students are South African, being 91.4% (324,607) of the sum of the student enrollments. The College of Economic and Management sciences (CEMS) is the largest of the eight colleges, with 26.7% (94,972) of the total student enrollments.

According to the same HEMIS submission, UNISA had 5,575 staff members in 2013. The staff complement consisted of 3,261 females (55.7%) and 2,593 (44.3%) males. 2011 figures from the Department of Institutional Statistics and Analysis (DISA) at the university show that the majority of the staff employed are non-professional administrative staff, being 56.8% (3,164). The number of institutional/research professionals is 33.2% (1,846) of the sum of the staff employed. Therefore, it is imperative for editors to note unverified notes here,<now everyone is editing>

=== Academic community ===
As one of the world's mega universities, Unisa presents academic offerings associated with both technological and traditional universities. These include, but are not limited to, a combination of career-orientated courses usually associated with a university of technology, and formative academic programmes typically linked to a traditional university.

- College of Accounting Sciences
- College of Agricultural and Environmental sciences
- College of Education
- College of Economic and Management sciences
- College of Graduate Studies
- College of Human sciences
- College of Law
- College of Science, Engineering and Technology
- Graduate School of Business Leadership (SBL)

In addition to the eight colleges and SBL, UNISA has numerous bureaus, centres, institutes, museums and units supporting academic development and research.

The qualifications offered by the College of Science, Engineering and Technology for the field of engineering are intended for technician and technologist training rather than as the academic component for admission to the engineering profession. The programs are therefore aligned with Dublin (Technician) & Sydney (Technologist) Accords. Graduates from the university in these programmes cannot register with the as a Professional Engineer with the Engineering Council of South Africa. The university has introduced a Bachelor of Engineering Technology Honours being a Level 8 qualification (on the National Qualification Framework). This is not recognized for admission as a Professional Engineer and is a bridging mechanism for further studies for technologists and technicians.

South Africa has an extreme skills shortage in respect of engineering and allied vocations.

== Ranking ==
University rankings

Global – Overall
- ARWU World: 901–1000 (2023)
- QS World: 901–950 (2026)
- THE World: 1001–1200 (2024)
- USNWR Global: =770 (2026)

In 2015, the University of South Africa was ranked the 6th best university in South Africa by the Times Higher Education. This makes the university the 6th best university in Africa, out of 30.

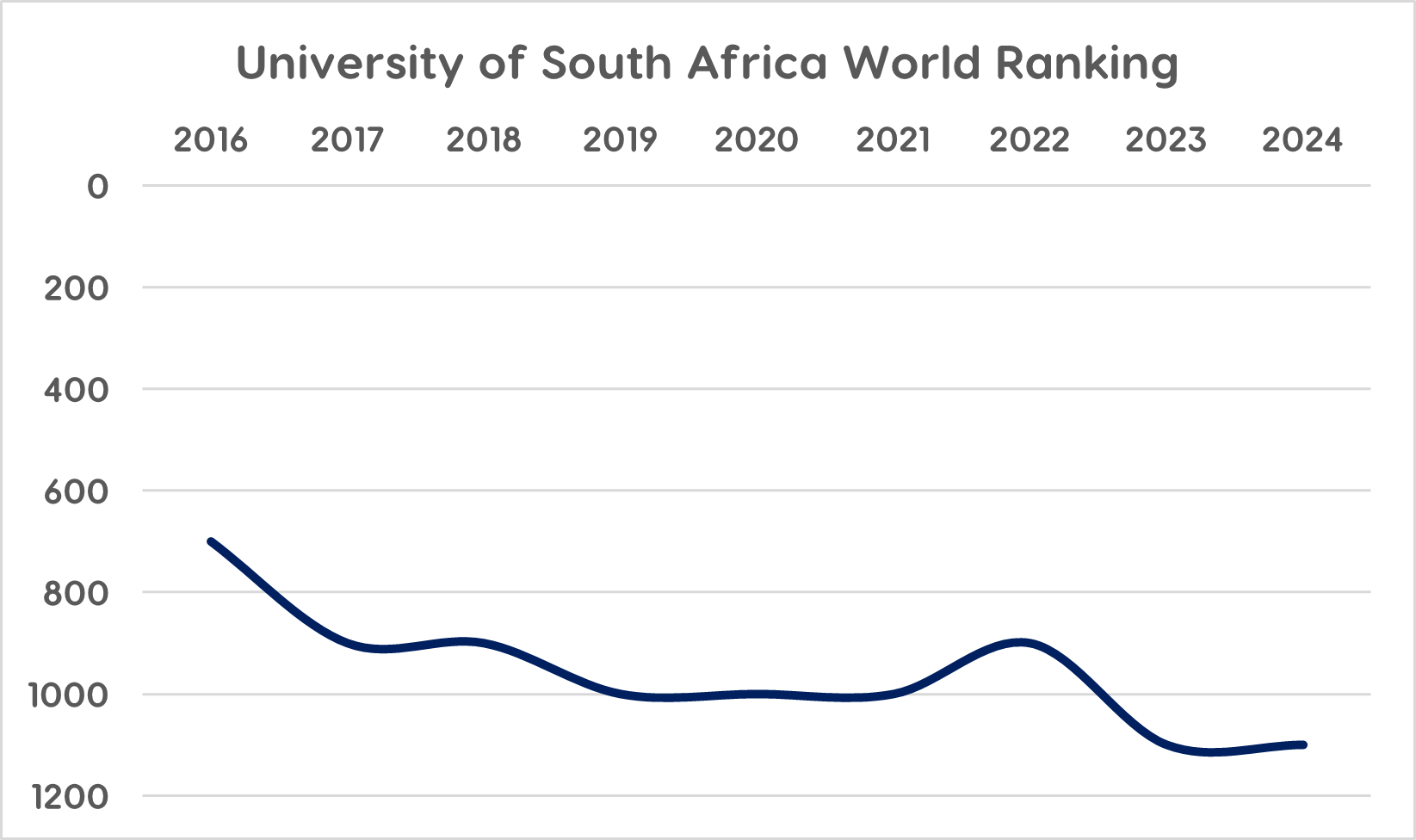
University of South Africa World Ranking

UNISA Times Higher Education Ranking 2016 to 2024
Year	World Rank
2024	1001–1200
2023	1001–1200
2022	801–1000
2021	1001+
2020	1001+
2019	1001+
2018	801–1000
2017	801+
2016	601–800

== Education at UNISA ==
=== Accreditation ===
UNISA received a royal charter in 1877. It currently operates under the Statute of the University of South Africa issued in terms of the Higher Education Act (No. 101 of 1997), and is accredited by the South African Department of Education and the Council on Higher Education (CHE). Its qualifications (including those of the SBL) are registered with the South African Qualifications Authority (SAQA).

=== International accreditation of UNISA's qualifications ===
UNISA is inter alia listed in the following publications: International handbook of universities published by the United Nations Education, Scientific and Cultural Organization (UNESCO) and officially verified by the International Association of Universities.

In other cases the publication of an institution's name in specific authoritative publications forms the basis of accreditation. Students must, however, inquire from the specific foreign country/university whether UNISA's qualifications are accredited/recognized.

Internationally, UNISA is listed in the Commonwealth Universities Handbook of 1999 and also in the International Handbook of Universities of 1998. It is actually listed as Member of the Association of Commonwealth Universities (ACU 2018).

The qualifications offered by the College of Science, Engineering and Technology are also accredited internationally through the accreditation done by the Engineering Council of South Africa under the Dublin and Sydney Accords.

=== Entrance requirements ===
Students need a school-leaving qualification that would entitle them to enter a university or college in their own country. The majority of applications are now processed online. Applicants must meet the requirements for the course they wish to study.

The university has introduced new rules on entrance requirements since 2014, this outright rejects TVET College graduates. Previously these students were allowed to complete bridge subjects and even Higher Certificates before going towards the Diploma and National Diploma. Even completing the National Senior Certificate (Vocational) Level 4 will not be accepted without further education. Universities South Africa argue the subjects from the school curriculum are more "significant in-depth" than the N3 subjects. The university is therefore likely the only university with this rule. University of South Africa refers these students to consider other universities and colleges.

=== Distance education at UNISA ===
UNISA is renowned for its versatile teaching approaches, providing online and distance courses and high-quality education. Since its establishment, UNISA has proposed the concept of "learner-centered" distance open education. Over the past 150 years, UNISA has continuously provided high-quality, efficiency-driven tools for students and teachers, for example, providing data services for students and academic personnel to access UNISA's virtual education environment.

UNISA has seized the opportunities of digital transformation, facilitated high scientific research output, and ensured more efficient course implementation through multiple and strategic partnerships of the years to enhance and innovate open and distance learning experience across the world. Notable among these partnerships is the Times Higher Education – University of South Africa on University Impact Forum: Quality Education by hosting higher education leaders to develop quality education in Africa to meet the United Nations Sustainable Development Goal 4 – Quality Education. Higher education Africa is hindered by chronic lack of investment, an unsustainable policy environment, competition from outside Africa for academic talent, international conflicts and a colonial legacy that has created multiple socio-economic challenges that higher education must respond to.

=== Disciplinary action ===
The UNISA policy document on Academic integrity sets out the basic definition and types of academic integrity transgressions (A1), guidelines for policy implementation (A2) guidelines for corrective measures to be imposed for transgression identified in the policy on academic integrity (A3) and declaration of originality (A4). UNISA has a zero tolerance for any form of dishonesty or cheating activity related to assessments and exams and spell out punishments for students found guilty of any form of academic dishonesty to have their modules cancelled and their marks withdrawn. They will also face up to a maximum of five years suspension from the university and from all universities in South Africa.

In recent times there has been an outcry on cheating cases, with students blaming glitches on the online invigilator application of the institution. UNISA is currently investigating over 1,400 student disciplinary cases of academic dishonesty as of 2024. The University’s Vice Principal for Institutional Development, Ramagoai Magano, says most cases of academic dishonesty are by postgraduate students. A significant number of the cases of academic dishonesty are cases of plagiarism as the university's online system has flagged potential instances of cheating and copying during tests which has prompted these thousands of investigations of academic integrity. Many students, on the other hand, have blamed the academic institution for the inconsistencies in its online platform academic assessment.

== Academic dress ==
- Bachelors, masters and honours degrees: black gown with the same pattern as a Master of Arts gown of the University of Oxford or Cambridge, and a black cap with a black tassel.
- Doctoral degrees: cardinal red gown with open sleeves lined in cardinal red, cardinal red cap with a tassel in the colour of the college concerned.

== Culture ==
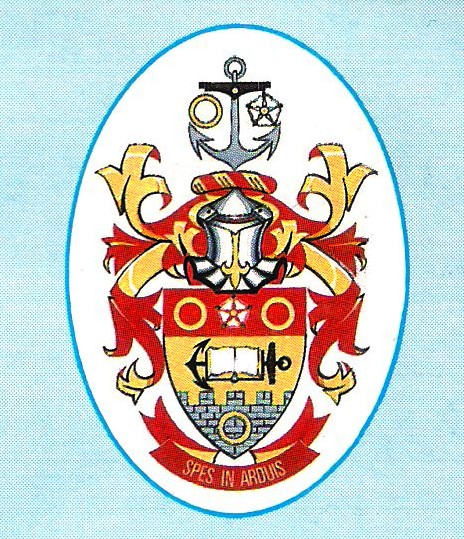
Former coat of arms

Unisa has been promoting and promulgating culture in all its manifestations since its inception in 1873. Apart from the academic courses offered by UNISA's College of Humanities, practical language, art and music skills have been actively pursued through the setting of curricula and the implementation of special courses and examinations.

- African Centre for Arts, Culture and Heritage studies
- Museum of Anthropology and Archaeology
- Department of Music
- Unisa Space Art Gallery
- Unisa Music Foundation

== Unisa Foundation ==
The Unisa Foundation was established in 1966 and now has approximately 280 active donors, many of them individual alumni with the desire to give back to the communities, South African and international, with a sense of social responsibility. Equally vital is the role played by the Board of Trustees, whose members not only oversee the affairs of the Unisa Foundation but who also lend the weight of their professional and personal reputations in a drive to reach potential donors, without financial reward to themselves.

Based at Unisa's main campus in Muckleneuck, Pretoria, the foundation has Fundraising and Development Divisions in Gauteng, the Western Cape and KwaZulu-Natal. These divisions support the smooth running of projects being undertaken in their regions while raising additional funding for local community projects.

== UNISA Press ==
UNISA Press is the largest university press in South Africa and Africa, with the biggest publication list.

Notable among the list of publications include; Sisters in the Struggle by Kalpana Hiralal (Women of Indian Origin in South Africa's Liberation Struggle 1900–1994 Volume 1: 1900–1940s), Essays in Online Education; A Global Perspective by Professor Mandla S. Makhanya and Dr Divya Singh, Names Fashioned by Gender by Prof Thenjiwe Meyiwa and Prof Madodo Cekiso (a collection of essays on onomastics – a linguistics field of study focusing on the origin, form, history, and use of proper names), Dark Matters: A Conversation with History, Saluting the Extraordinary Humanitarian Endeavours of South African Black Scientists by Colin T. Johnson and Violence in Schools: South Africa in an International Context by Clive Harber and Vusi Mncube.

== List of notable alumni ==
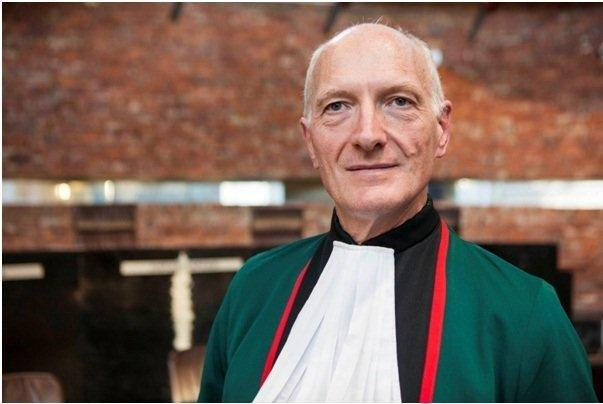
Edwin Cameron

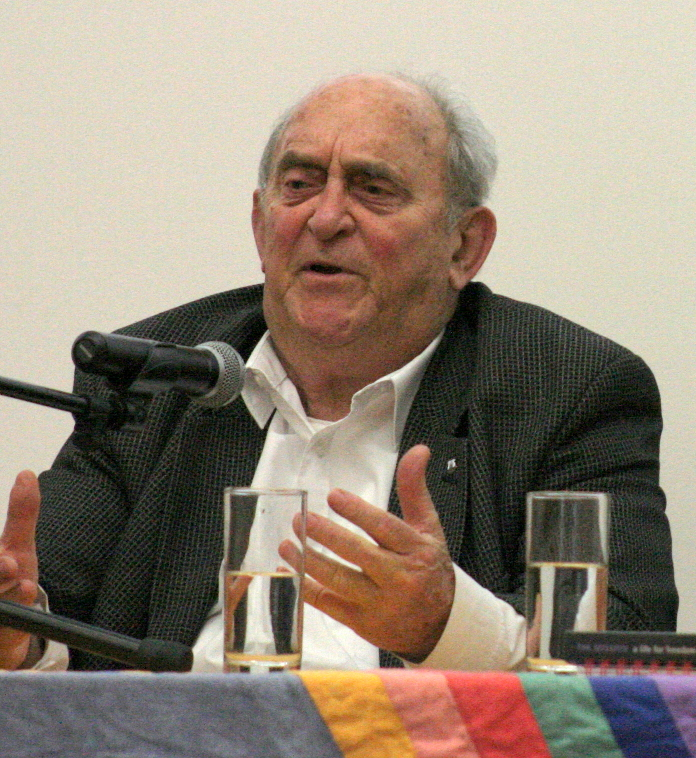
Denis Goldberg

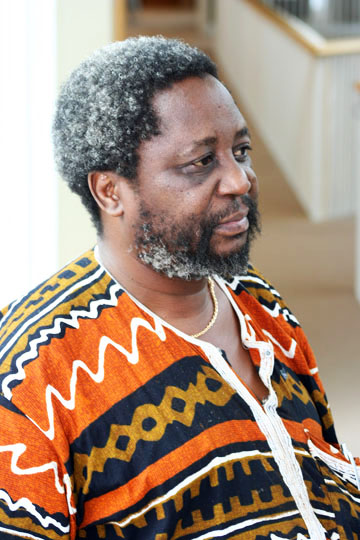
Chenjerai Hove

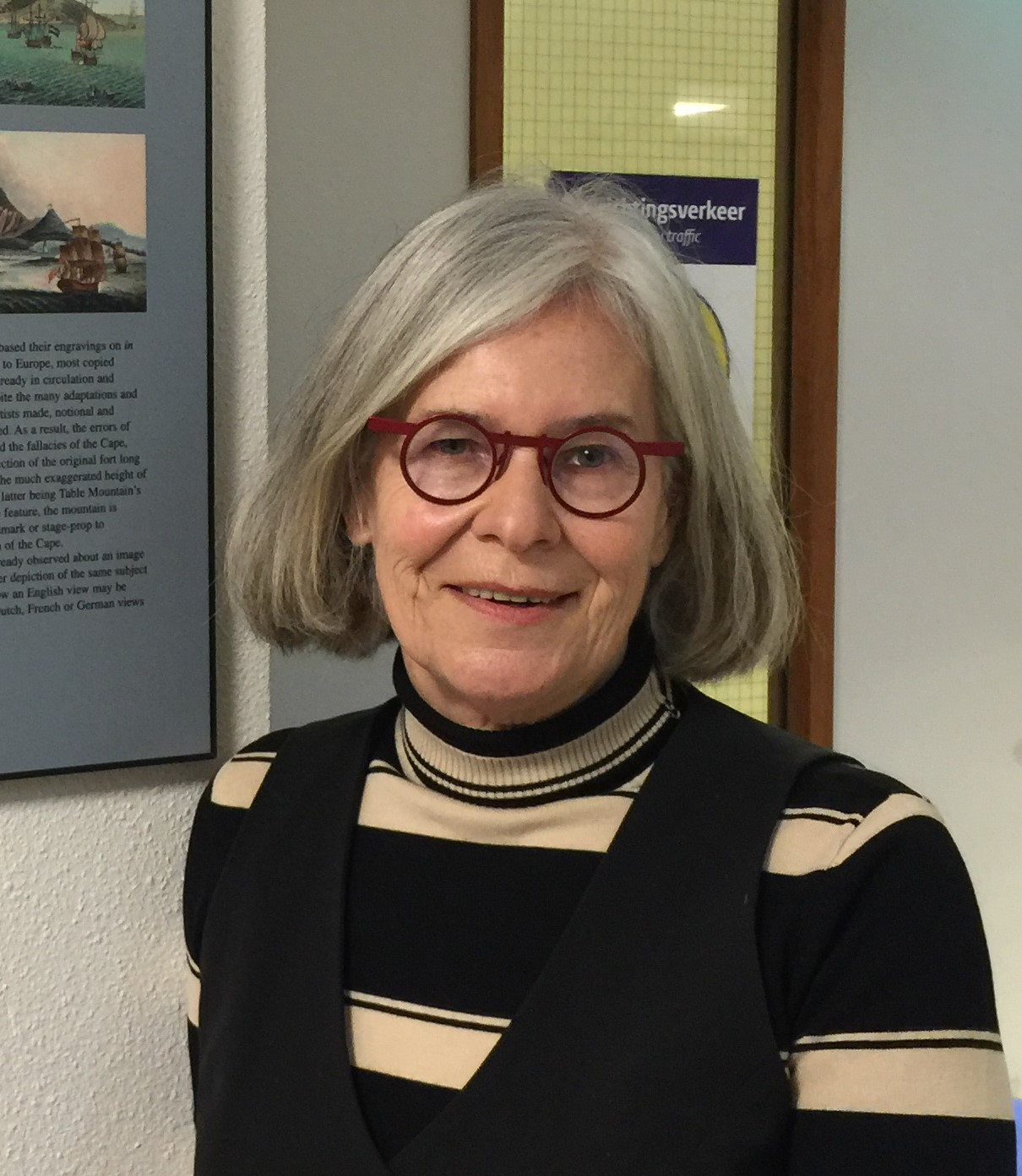
Antjie Krog

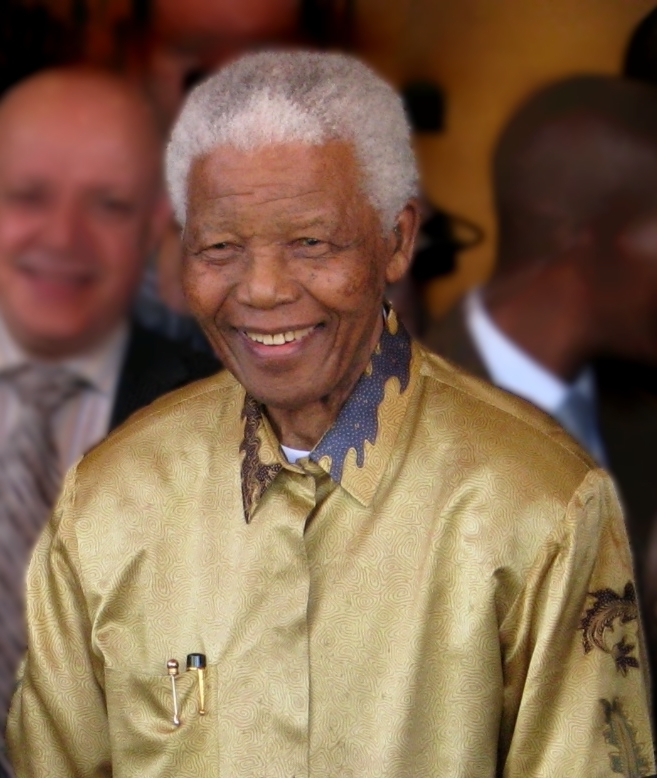
Nelson Mandela

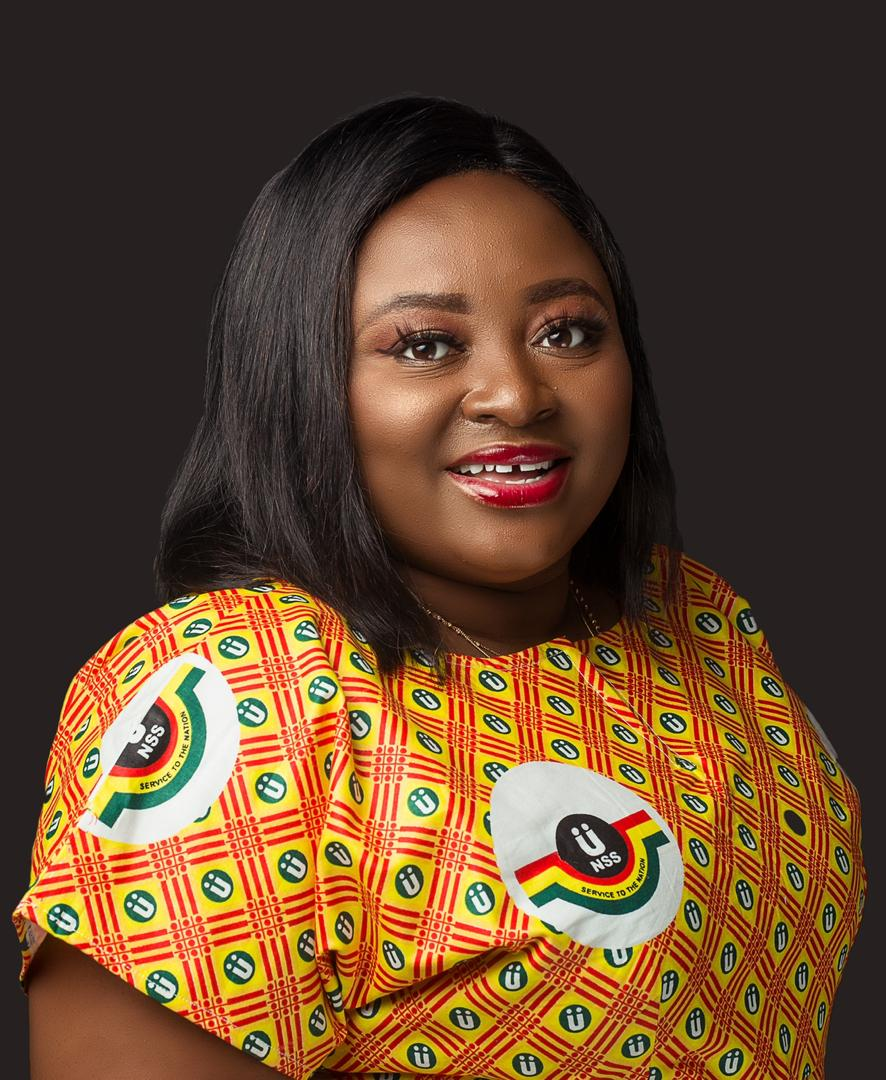
Gifty Oware-Mensah

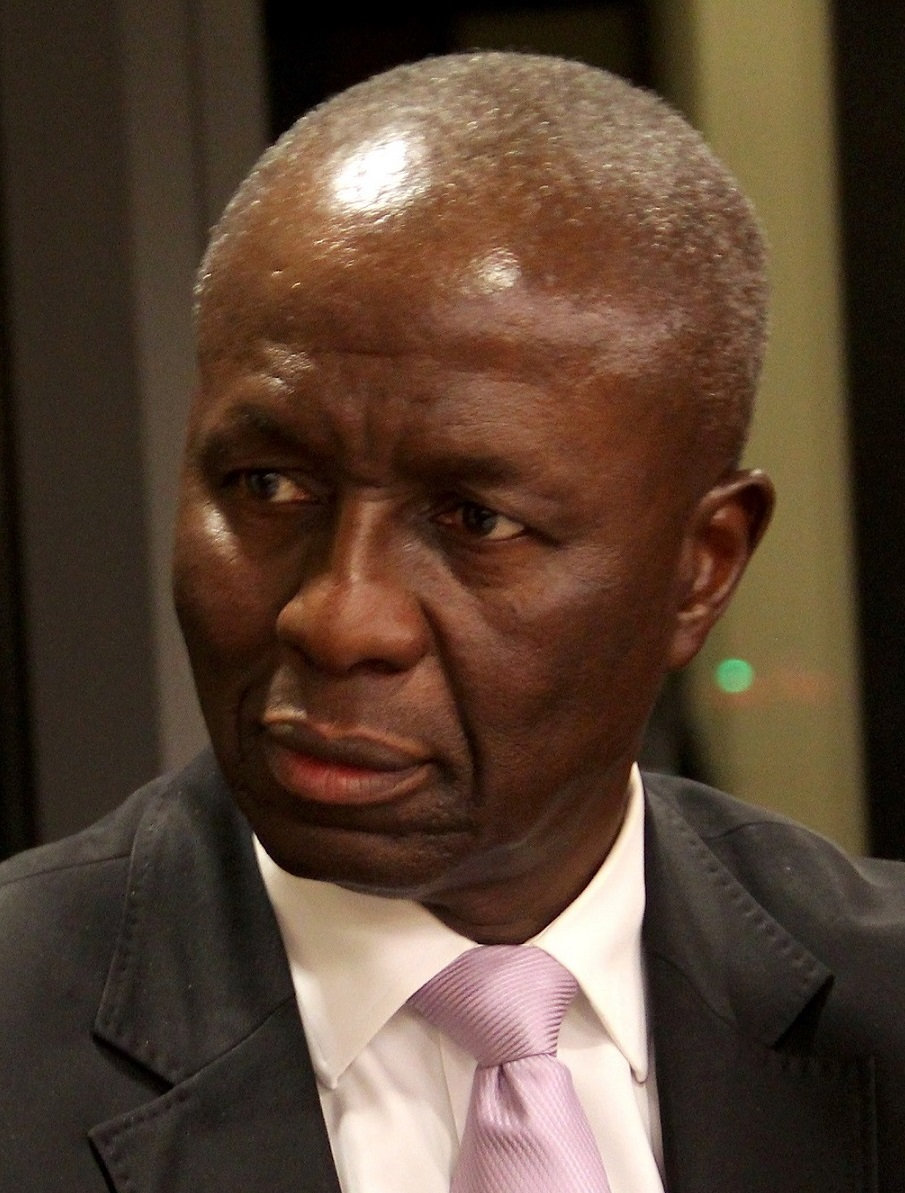
Dikgang Moseneke

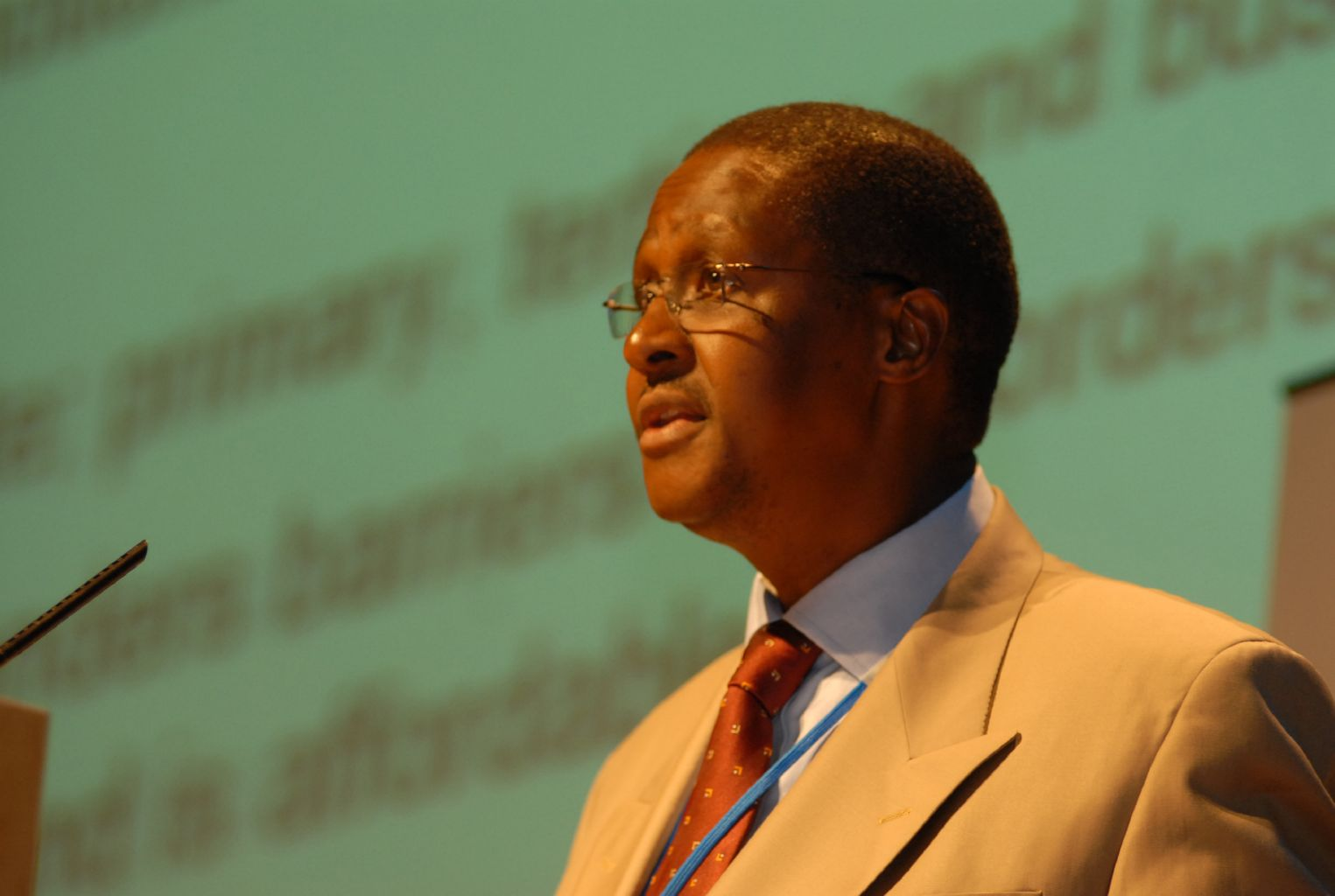
Barney Pityana

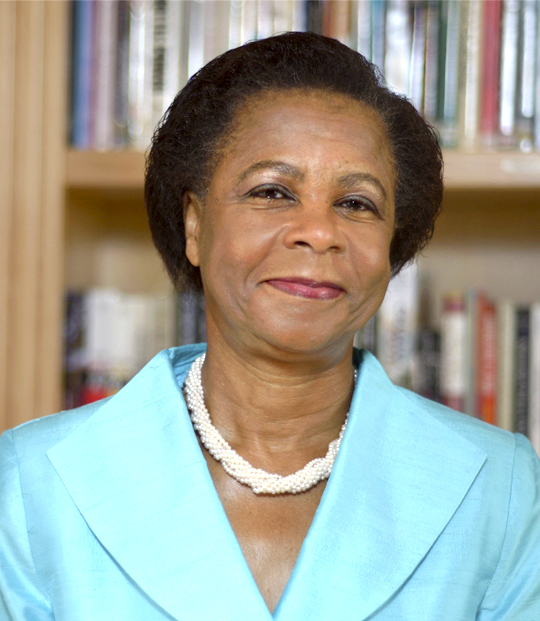
Mamphela Ramphele

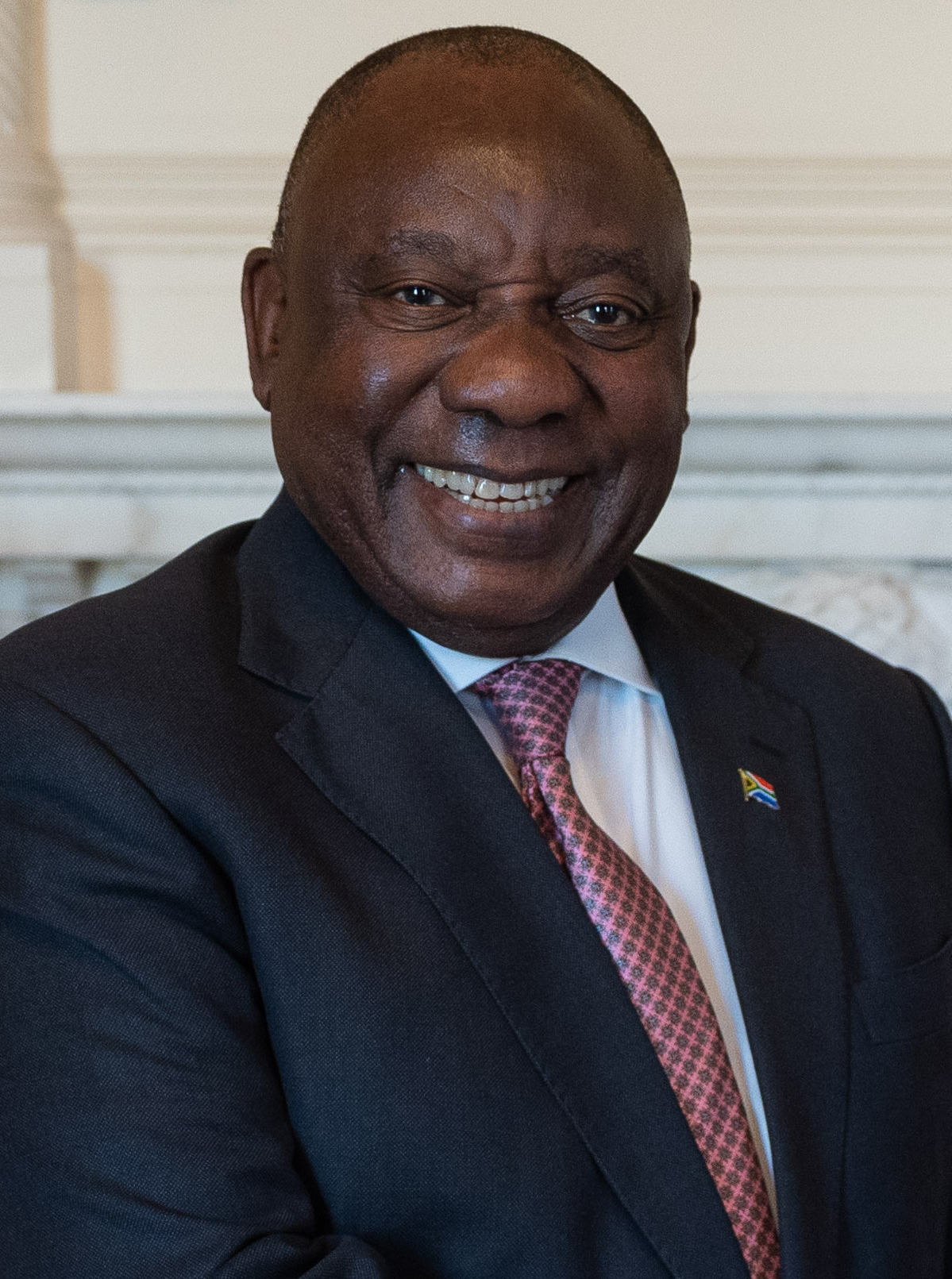
Cyril Ramaphosa

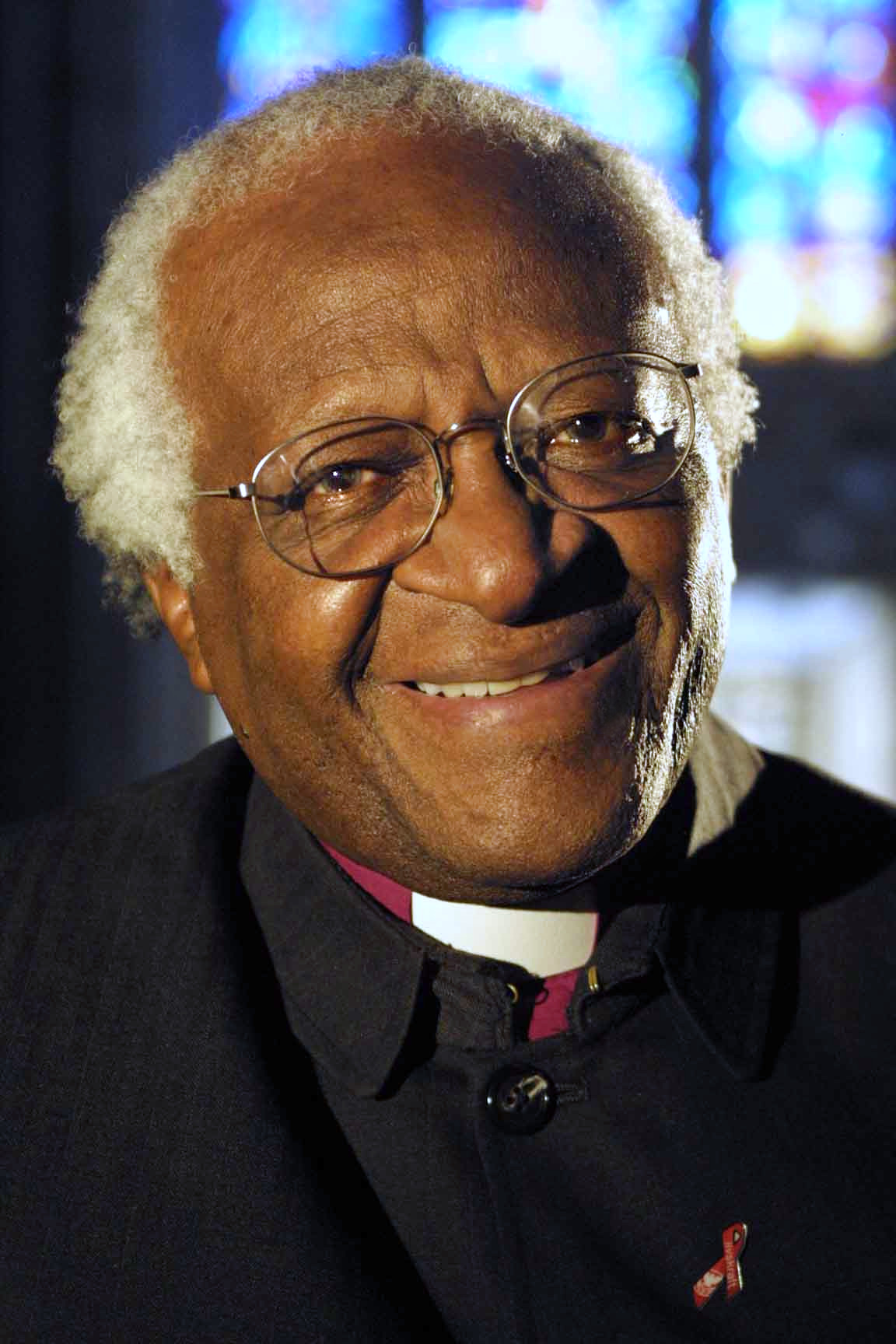
Desmond Tutu

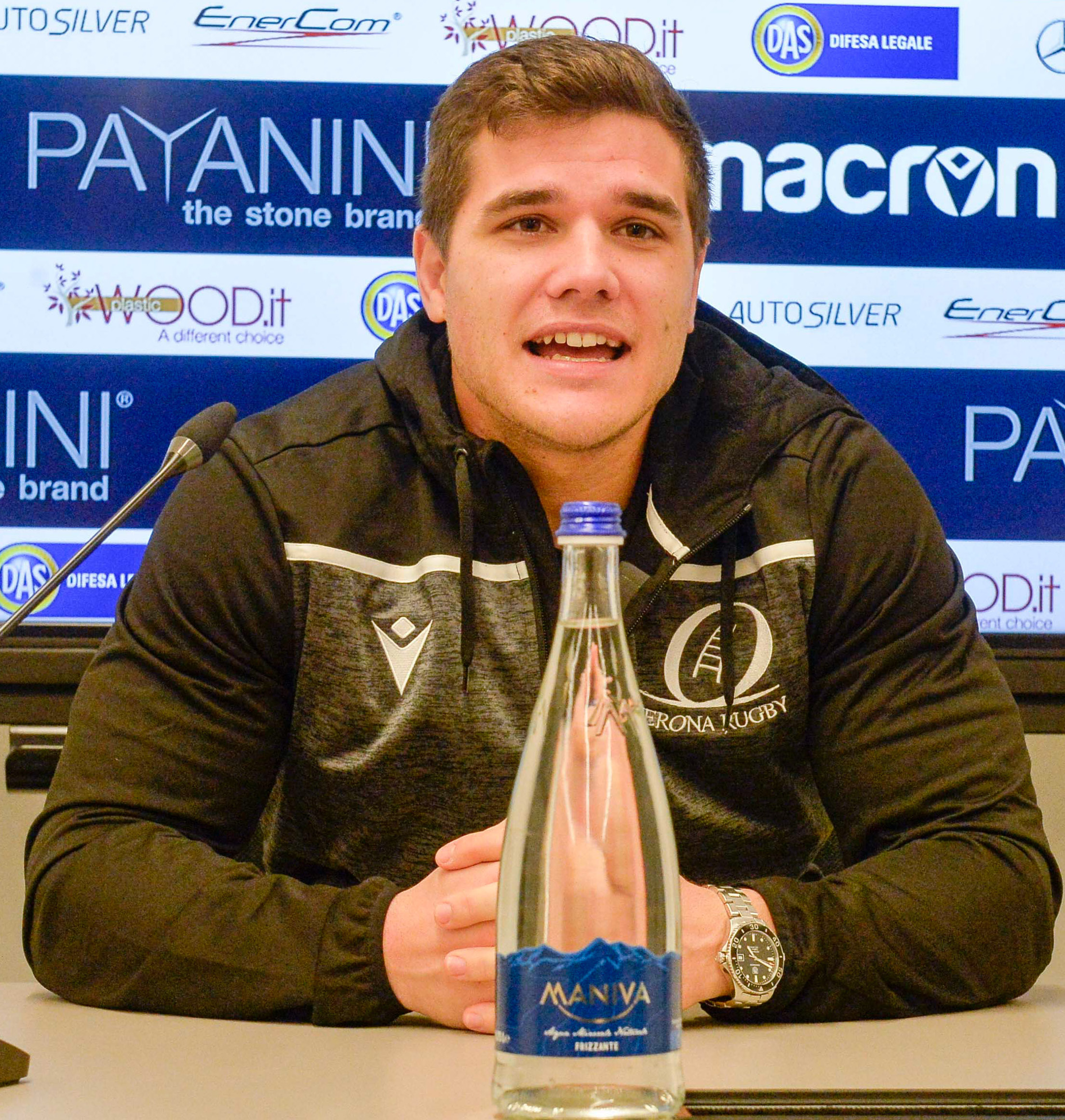
Gino Lupini

== Controversies ==
On 17 October 2021, a leaked ministerial report claimed that rampant corruption at Unisa undermines the quality of education, and highlighted the risk that the institution is becoming a "qualifications factory". The claim that Unisa was becoming a diploma mill due to mismanagement were being reviewed by Blade Nzimande, the Minister of Higher Education, Science and Technology. On 19 October 2021, Unisa released a statement attempting to "correct" these claims.

The University boasts of being an institution that has given access to tertiary education to all people, irrespective of race or colour, particularly given South Africa's history of apartheid. Its rich history includes a diverse mix of notable and famous alumni. This identity of UNISA has been its strongest and positive attraction that it is open, flexible and affordable thus serving the needs of the most disadvantaged communities. However, the University's anniversary year in 2023 is blemished by a range of controversies and a failure to live up to its mission and strategic goals as it celebrates its 150 years of existence. These controversies elicited the Human Rights Commission report, the Ministerial Task Team Report, and now this Independent Assessor report, all of which do not present a positive outlook for the University. According to the report, UNISA's problems came to the fore around 2015, with reports of challenges in governance, management and the quality of higher education provision such as allegations of deterioration of governance, instability of the executive management; continued complaints regarding student administration issues; the under-spending of earmarked grants; poor throughput and success rates, and very high dropout numbers; specific concerns regarding the quality of teacher education provision; levels of support provided to students at the institution within the context of distance learning; and concerns around the enrollment planning processes.

Critics have shared their opinions about Nzimande announcement of his intention to place the 150-year-old open-distance e-learning institution under administration after dissolving the institution's council and appointing former University of Johannesburg Vice-chancellor Prof Ihron Rensburg as administrator for 24 months. Minister Blade Nzimande's appointment of Prof Ihron Rensburg as administrator in October 2023 puts control of UNISA under the government for the next 24 months and he will be reporting to the Minister of Higher Education, Science and Innovation or any delegated official in the Department of Higher Education and Training in writing on a biannual basis. A notable critic of the Minister's placement of UNISA under administration, Dr Seán Muller, a senior research fellow at the Johannesburg Institute of Advanced Study based at the University of Johannesburg has indicated that, placing UNISA under an Administrator will not solve the problems and challenges outlined by the Independent Assessor in his report. However, he reiterates that, "What has been clear is that there are many vested interests and agendas at play, including some of those who support the institution being placed under administration for reasons that have nothing to do with setting it on a better path."

The management of University of South Africa (UNISA) challenged the decision of the Minister of Higher Education, Science and Innovation to place the institution under administration in court by interdicting the Minister Blade Nzimande. A sighted order granted by the North Gauteng High Court declared that Nzimande's notice of intention was in breach of an order granted by Mr Justice Adams on 24 August 2023. The institution's council has always maintained that the report of the independent assessor was fundamentally flawed, and its recommendations misplaced.

Another concern about the Minister's decision to place UNISA under administration has brought up possible impacts on students of the University. However, the Department of Higher Education, Science and Innovation has assured University of South Africa (UNISA) students they will not be affected when the institution is placed under administration.

== See also ==
- List of universities in South Africa
- List of split up universities
