= First Lady's Cup (Ghana) =

Ghana football cup game

GHALCA First Lady's Cup
- Organiser(s): Ghana League Clubs Association (GHALCA)
- Founded: 2021; 5 years ago
- Region: Ghana
- Teams: 2
- Current champions: Hasaacas Ladies
- Most championships: Hasaacas Ladies (1 title)
- Broadcaster: GTV

The First Lady's Cup is an annual one-off game, featuring two selected clubs at the end of the season. The cup is called the GHALCA First Lady's Cup because it is organized by the Ghana League Clubs Association (GHALCA) and is played in honour of the sitting First Lady of Ghana.

The current holders are Hasaacas Ladies, who defeated rivals Ampem Darkoa Ladies 4–3 on penalties after the match ended in a 1–1 draw after full time in the 2021 maiden match.

== History ==
In early 2021, The Ghana League Clubs Association (GHALCA) began talks with Ghana Football Association (GFA) on the organization of the First Lady's Cup a female version of the President's Cup. They further set up a four-member committee to work on the competition including Anita Wiredu-Minta, a Ghanaian former international. In May 2021, GHALCA announced that arrangement for the organization of the First Lady's Cup has been concluded and formalized by the association's welfare body. The cup competition was launched on 5 November 2021. On 10 December 2021, the maiden edition was played at the Accra Sports Stadium with Hasaacas Ladies emerging victorious after a 4–3 penalty shootout after the match remained goalless after full time.

== List of finals ==
Year	Winners	Score	Runners up
2021	Hasaacas Ladies	1–1 (4–3 p)	Ampem Darkoa Ladies

=== Performance by club ===
Club	Winners	Runners-up	Winning years	Years runners-up
Hasaacas Ladies	1	0	2021	
Ampem Darkoa Ladies	0	1		2021

== See also ==
- Football in Ghana
- Ghana Women's Premier League
- Ghana Women's FA Cup
