= Anita Wiredu-Minta =

Ghanaian football manager and former footballer

Personal information
- Full name: Anita Wiredu-Minta
- Date of birth: September 4, 1983 (age 43)
- Place of birth: Ghana
- Position: Forward

Senior career*
Years	Team	Apps	(Gls)
2001–2010	Ghatel Ladies		
2010–2018	Immigration Ladies		

International career
2005–2007	Ghana		
- * Club domestic league appearances and goals

Anita Wiredu-Minta (born 4 September 1983) is a Ghanaian association football manager, an immigration officer and former professional footballer. She is currently the assistant coach of the Ghana Women's Premier League team Immigration Ladies and team manager for the Ghana women's national football team. During her playing days, she played as a forward for Ghatel Ladies, Immigration Ladies and the Ghana national team.

== Career ==
Wiredu-Minta is an immigration officer by profession. She served as an assistant Immigration Control Officer 1 (AICO I) from 2002 to 2012, Senior Inspector 2012 to 2016, Assistant Superintendent 2IC of Ghana Immigration Sports from Apr 2016 to Apr 2020. She was promoted to the rank of Deputy Superintendent under the Ghana Immigration Sports in April 2020.

== Playing career ==
Wiredu-Minta started her career with Ghatel Ladies, playing for them from March 2001 to October 2010. She later joined Immigration Ladies Football Club in 2010 and retired in 2018. She also played for the Ghana women's national football team. She played in the 2006 African Women's Championship helping Ghana to finish as runner-ups after losing to Nigeria in the final.

== Coaching career ==
After retiring from playing football, Wiredu-Minta went into coaching. Between August 2017 to September 2018, she served as the welfare officer for the Ghana women's U20 national team. In July 2019, she was appointed as the assistant coach for Immigration Ladies Football Club. She was elevated to the role of welfare officer for senior team the Ghana women's national football team (Black Queens).

Wiredu-Minta also serves on The Ghana Leagues Clubs Association (GHALCA) executive board as the women's representative. She was also appointed to serve on the Events and Competitions committee in March 2021. She is a member of the newly formed First Lady's Cup committee by GHALCA.

She is inaugural member of the Retired Women National Footballers Association of Ghana (RWONFAG) of which she serves as the association's inaugural general secretary.

In 2023 Wiredu-Minta was instated as a member of the Ghana U-20 women's coaching team.
