= Gladys Amfobea =

Ghanaian footballer (born 1998)

Personal information
- Date of birth: 1 July 1998 (age 28)
- Position: Defender

Senior career*
Years	Team	Apps	(Gls)
2018–2022	Lady Strikers	13+	(8+)
2022–2023	Ampem Darkoa	0	(0)
2023–2024	Lady Strikers	5	(6)
2024	SAS	7	(12)

International career^{‡}
2012–2014	Ghana U17	7	(1)
2018–2022	Ghana	4	(1)
- * Club domestic league appearances and goals as of 4 August 2024 ‡ National team caps and goals as of 13 April 2022

Gladys Amfobea (born 1 July 1998) is a Ghanaian footballer who plays as a defender. She played for the Ghana national team between 2018 and 2022.

== Club career ==
Amfobea played for SAS during the 2023–24 Lebanese Women's Football League.

== International career ==
Amfobea competed for Ghana at the 2018 Africa Women Cup of Nations, playing in three matches and scoring one goal.

== See also ==
- List of Ghana women's international footballers
