= Lady Strikers F.C. =

Football club in Ghana

LadyStrikers F.C.
- Full name: LadyStrikers Football Club
- Ground: Robert Mensah Sports Stadium, Cape Coast
- Owner: Kojo Taylor
- League: Ghana Women’s Premier League

LadyStrikers Football Club is a Ghanaian professional women's football club based in Cape Coast in the Central Region of Ghana. The club features in the Ghana Women’s Premier League. The club is sponsored by Sanford World Clinic.

== Grounds ==
The club plays their home matches at the Robert Mensah Sports Stadium.

== Notable players ==
- Gladys Amfobea
- Ellen Coleman (Team captain 2021–)
