= Ellen Coleman (footballer) =

Ghanaian footballer

Personal information
- Date of birth: 11 December 1995 (age 30)
- Position: Defender

Team information
- Current team: 1207 Antalya
- Number: 19

Senior career*
Years	Team	Apps	(Gls)
- Lady Strikers
	1207 Antalya	3	(0)

International career^{‡}
2017-18	Ghana	2	(0)
- * Club domestic league appearances and goals as of 4 October 2025 ‡ National team caps and goals as of 16 June 2019

Ellen Coleman (born 11 December 1995) is a Ghanaian footballer who plays as a defender for the Turkish Super League club 1207 Antalya and the Ghana women's national team.

== Club career ==
Coleman has played for Lady Strikers in Ghana.

In September 2025, she moved to Turkey, and signed with 1207 Antalya to play in the Super League.

== International career ==
Coleman was on the Ghana squad at the 2018 Africa Women Cup of Nations but did not appear in any matches.
