= Ophelia Serwaa Amponsah =

Ghanaian footballer

Personal information
- Position: Forward

Team information
- Current team: Ampem Darkoa Ladies
- Number: 7

Senior career*
| Years | Team | Apps | (Gls) |
| 2019– | Ampem Darkoa Ladies | 19 | (27) |

International career
| 2020– | Ghana | | |
- * Club domestic league appearances and goals

Ophelia Serwaa Amponsah is a Ghanaian professional footballer who plays as a forward for Ghana Women's Premier League side Ampem Darkoa Ladies and the Ghana women's national football team. She was top goal scorer in the 2020–21 season. She was adjudged the Women's footballer of the Year in 2021.

== Club career ==
Pokuaa joined Ampem Darkoa Ladies in 2019. She scored 10 goals in 5 matches in the 2019–20 season before the league was truncated. The following season, the 2020–21 season, she scored 17 goals to end the season as the top goal scorer.

== International career ==
In 2020, after an impressive season with Ampem Darkoa, she was named on the squad for the Ghana U17 women's team (the Black Maidens) ahead of their 2020 African U-17 Women's World Cup Qualifying Tournament. She scored a goal on her debut against Liberia to help Ghana to a 2–0 win. In the return leg, she scored 4 first half goals in a thrilling 8–0 victory. The qualifiers were cancelled in 2020 due to the COVID-19 pandemic however she ended as the top scorer with 5 goals in 2 matches. She was called up for the first time into the Ghana women's national football team in 2020 for the 2020 CAF Women's Olympic Qualifying Tournament.

== Honours ==
Individual

- NASCO GWPL Player of the Month: May 2021
- Ghana Women's Premier League Top goal scorer: 2020–21
- Ghana Football Awards Women's Footballer of the Year: 2021
