= Berry Ladies Football Club =

Football club in Ghana

- Full name: Berry Ladies Football Club
- Ground: Madina Astroturf
- Capacity: 5000
- Coordinates: 5.677230133971621, -0.1831426
- Owner: Gifty Oware-Mensah
- Chairman: Gifty Oware-Mensah
- Head Coach: Paul Freeman Amponsah
- League: Ghana Women’s Premier League
- 2022/2023: Ghana Women's Premier League 4 of 16
- Website: https://berryladiesfcgh.com/

Berry Ladies Football Club is a Ghanaian professional women's football club based in Accra in the Greater Accra Region of Ghana. The club features in the Southern Zone of the Ghana Women’s Premier League. The club was previously known as Halifax Ladies Football Club or as Halifax Soccer Academy Ladies until 2020.

== History ==
Berry Ladies (then Halifax Ladies Football Club or Halifax Soccer Academy Ladies) was based in Nungua in Greater Accra Region. In 2020, the club was taken over by a new management board led by Gifty Oware-Aboagye. The name of the club was then changed to Berry Ladies. The club was relocated from Nungua to Madina still within the Greater Accra Region.

=== 2019-2022 ===
They won the Greater Accra Regional Football Association (GARFA) Women's Division One League Zone A to qualify for the Regional Women's Zonal playoff and champions of champions (championship final for the GARFA Women's League). They won the championship final and won the Regional Women's Zonal playoff for the Southern Zone to qualify for the Ghana Women's Premier League for the first time in the club's history.

=== 2020 - Till Date ===
Before the start of their first top-flight season, the club appointed Mercy Tagoe-Quarcoo, a Ghanaian football coach and former player who played as a defender for the Ghana women's national football team. In their debut season (2020–21 season) in the GWPL, they placed second in the Southern Zone behind Hasaacas Ladies. Their second-place finish earned them qualification into the Ghana Women's Super Cup. In the 2022/2023 season, they finished fourth in the Southern-Zone of the Ghana Women's Premier League under their new interim coach, Coach Paul Freeman Amponsah. Coach Paul Freeman Amponsah was then appointed as the new Head Coach of the Club ahead of the 2023 Ghana Women’s Super Cup League. Berry Ladies FC finished 3rd place in the 2023 Ghana Women’s Super Cup for the first time in the history of the club.

== Grounds ==
The club plays their home matches at the Madina AstroTurf.

== Players ==
=== 2023/2024 Season Roster ===
Shirt Number	Player name	Position	Appearances	Goals	Nationality
1	Grace Krofi Amoah	Goalkeeper	6	0	Ghana
16	Gifty Amewoyi	Goalkeeper	0	0	Ghana
	Abigail Tawiah Mensah	Goalkeeper	Transferred		Ghana
	Portia Asantewaa	Goalkeeper	Transferred		Ghana
	Doris Addi	Goalkeeper	o	0	Ghana
2	Hannah Buabeng	Defender	1	0	Ghana
3	Dorcas Quansah	Defender	0	0	Ghana
4	Cynthia Boakye-Yiadom	Defender	2	0	Ghana
21	Comfort Yeboah	Defender	6	2	Ghana
23	Victoria Amenyo	Defender	2	0	Ghana
24	Regina Donkor	Defender	6	0	Ghana
25	Deborah Annoh	Defender	6	1	Ghana
	Rahama Jafaru	Defender	0	0	Ghana
	Ama Marina Boaduwaa	Defender	Transferred		Ghana
	Princess Boakye Ansah	Defender	0	0	Ghana
	Linda Oforiwaa	Defender	Transferred		Ghana
5	Doreen Graham	Midfielder	6	1	Ghana
6	Comfort Cobinnah	Midfielder	6	0	Ghana
12	Fakiha Alhassan	Midfielder	5	2	Ghana
13	Sarah Buckman	Midfielder	0	0	Ghana
14	Ernestina Amoateng	Midfielder	5	1	Ghana
17	Janet Korkor Osei	Midfielder	6	2	Ghana
27	Afriyie Agyeiwaa Akosua	Midfielder	0	0	Ghana
	Nina Norshie	Midfielder	Transferred		Ghana
	Selina Anima	Midfielder	Transferred		Ghana
	Rashida Ibrahim	Midfielder	Transferred		Ghana
	Vivian Asare	Midfielder	0	0	Ghana
	Precious Ohenewaa	Midfielder	0	0	Ghana
7	Jacqueline Amponsah Ampomaa	Forward	2	0	Ghana
8	Elizabeth Adjoa Linking Boateng	Forward	4	2	Ghana
9	Victoria Salifu	Forward	5	0	Ghana
10	Christabel Boateng	Forward	3	0	Ghana
11	Felicity Antwi-Agyei	Forward	3	0	Ghana
18	Portia Sekyiwaa	Forward	5	0	Ghana
29	Dorcas Ntiriwa	Forward	1	0	Ghana
	Benedicta Swatson	Forward			
	Elizabeth Ayeabea	Forward	4	0	Ghana
	Mabel Amoyaw	Forward	0	0	Ghana
	Priscilla Sintim Agyemang	Forward	0	0	Ghana
	Thelma Baffour Attuah	Forward	Transferred		Ghana
	Aisha Osman	Forward	0	0	Ghana
	Emmanuela Adu Gyamfi	Forward	Transferred		Ghana
	Ginika Ikeh	Forward	0	0	Nigeria
	Diana Weige	Forward	Transferred		Ghana
	Daniela Abass	Forward	0	0	Ghana
	Lilian Serinye		0	0	Ghana
	Bebe Kpozo		0	0	Ghana
	Ernestina Tetteh		0	0	Ghana
	Priscilla Lartey		0	0	Ghana
	Eugenia Korkor		0	0	Ghana

== Titles ==
Here are trophies won by Berry Ladies

Titles Won By Berry Ladies FC
Season	Competition	Position
2022/2023	Ghana Women's Super Cup	3rd Place
2019/2020	Greater Accra Regional Football Association Women's Division One League	Winner
2019/2020	Division One Regional Women's Zonal League	Winner

== Management ==
Club Owner & CEO - Gifty Oware-Aboagye

General Manager - Victor Elias Seshie

Sporting Director - Kwasi Osei Danso Ofori-Atta

Director - Paa Kwesi Todd

Coaches - Reginald Asante, Paul Freeman Amponsah

Head, Digital Marketing - Samuel Kwame Boadu

Welfare Manager – Aicha Amoako Boukari Denteh

Kits & Equipment Manager – Gideon Sosu

== Affiliation ==
Berry Ladies announced ahead of the 2023/2024 season its partnership with Berekum Chelsea Football Club to become their women's team for the sports outfit
