= Millot Abena Pokuaa =

Ghanaian association football player

Personal information
- Position: Forward

Team information
- Current team: Hasaacas Ladies
- Number: 3

Senior career*
Years	Team	Apps	(Gls)
2019–	Hasaacas Ladies		

International career
2020–	Ghana		
- * Club domestic league appearances and goals

Millot Abena Pokuaa (born 10 October 2001) is a Ghanaian professional footballer who plays as a forward for Ghana Women's Premier League side Hasaacas Ladies and the Ghana women's national football team. She represented Ghana at the U17 level at World Cups in 2018.

== Career ==
Pokuaa joined Hasaacas Ladies in 2019. She was called up for the first time into the Ghana women's national football team in 2020 for the 2020 CAF Women's Olympic Qualifying Tournament.
