= Hasaacas Ladies F.C. =

Football team in Ghana

Sekondi Hasaacas Ladies F.C.
- Full name: Sekondi Hasaacas Ladies Football Club
- Nicknames: Hasmal; Do The Do; Giant of the west
- Founded: 2003; 23 years ago
- Stadium: Kobby's Astro Turf
- Coach: Raymond Fenny
- League: Ghana Women’s Premier League
- 2020–21: GWPL 1st of 16 (champions)
- Website: https://hasaacasladies.com/

Sekondi Hasaacas Ladies F.C. is a Ghanaian professional women's football club based in Sekondi-Takoradi in the Western Region of Ghana. The club features in the Ghana Women’s Premier League. The club was formed as a women's club by Sekondi Hasaacas F.C. football management. It is currently the most successful women's club in Ghana after winning the Women's League on 4 occasions.

== History ==
=== Establishment ===
Hasaacas Ladies Football Club was formed in June 2003, the club was formed as part of the Sekondi Hasaacas F.C. conglomerate of clubs. The idea to form the a women's club was brought up by women's football enthusiast and Sekondi Hasaacas fan Ben Hassan upon his return from Germany, he later pitched the idea to Benjamin Nanabayin Eyison and Alhaji Fuseini Mahama and the club was formed. After that the club played in games in the Western Region and invitational friendly tournaments internationally before the creation of the Ghana Women's Premier League.

=== Ghana Women's Premier League (2012–) ===
On 8 April 2013, the club won the inaugural Ghana Women's Premier League in the 2012–13 season after defeating Fabulous Ladies by 2–1 in the Championship final. Their club captain Samira Suleman was adjudged as the best player of the inaugural season. The 2013–14 season was as successful as the previous season, as Hasaacas won the Southern Zone League and qualified for the Championship final against Fabulous Ladies winners of the Northern Zone, making it the second successive year the two teams were meeting in a championship final. Hasaacas Ladies defeated Fabulous Ladies via a 5–3 penalty shootout after the match had ended in a goalless draw after extra time to clinch the title for the second time in the club's history. Ghanaian International defender Janet Egyir was adjudged the player of the season. The club is set to represent Ghana at the maiden CAF Women's Champions League scheduled June 2021.

2021-Present

Hasaacas Ladies won the 2021 Ghana Women's Premier League qualifying for the WAFU ZONE B Caf Women's Champions League in the process. They were drawn in the Ground B on the tournament. In the first match of the tournament, the lost 2-0 to River Angels F.C. of Nigeria. They won 3-0 against [AS Police] to reach the semi-finals of the tournament. On August 2, Hasaacas Ladies defeated [US Force Améé] 2-0 to qualify to the final. On August 5, Hasaacas Ladies defeated River Angels F.C. 3-1 to winner the tournament. Winning the WAFU ZONE B Caf Women's Champions League, granted them automatic qualification to play in the maiden CAF Women's Champions League.

== Grounds ==
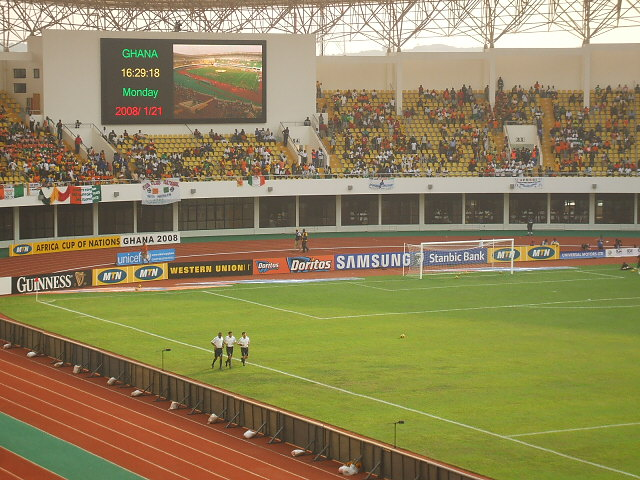
Essipong Stadium

The club trains at the Hasaacas Park also known as the Chapel Hill Park in Sekondi-Takoradi. They occasionally train at the Effiakuma police park. The Essipong Stadium and Essipong Stadium Annex have served as home venue for their fixtures over a period of years, however the club currently plays their home matches at Gyandu Park in Sekondi-Takoradi.

== Support ==
The club is the women's club affiliate of male team Sekondi Hasaacas F.C. who won the Ghana Premier League in 1977.

== Honours ==
=== Domestic ===
Leagues

- Ghana Women's Premier League

- Winners (record) (4): 2012–13, 2013–14, 2014–15, 2020–21

- Ghana Women's Special Competition

- Winners (1): 2019

Cups

- Ghana Women's FA Cup

- Winners (1): 2021

=== African ===
- CAF Women's Champions League WAFU Zone B Qualifiers

- Winners (1): 2021

- CAF Women's Champions League

- Runners-up (1): 2021

=== Doubles and Trebles ===
- Trebles
  - Premier League, FA Cup, WAFU Zone B: 2020–21

== Notable players ==
For details on notable Hasaacas Ladies F.C. footballers see Category:Hasaacas Ladies F.C. players.

== See also ==
- Women's football in Ghana
- Sekondi Hasaacas F.C.
- Ampem Darkoa Ladies F.C.
