= Tanzania women's national football team results =

This article lists the results and fixtures for the Tanzania women's national football team.

Known as the Twiga Stars, the team represents Tanzania in international women's association football, representing the country as a whole in international competitions and mainland Tanzania in CECAFA competitions. The team is governed by the Tanzania Football Federation and competes under the Confederation of African Football (CAF), as well as in regional competitions organized by CECAFA and international competitions sanctioned by FIFA.

The team played its first international match in August 2002, defeating fellow East African side Eritrea 3–2. Tanzania's largest recorded victory came against Zanzibar, a 12–0 win, while its largest victory over a FIFA member association was a 9–0 defeat of South Sudan on 16 November 2019. The team's heaviest defeat was a 6–0 loss to South Africa in a friendly match in July 2010.

Tanzania is one of the most successful women's national teams in East Africa. It has qualified for the Women's Africa Cup of Nations (WAFCON) three times and has won the CECAFA Women's Championship on three occasions.

== Record per opponent ==
As of match played on 4 August 2026 against Ivory Coast
Key

Positive balance (more wins than losses)
Neutral balance (as many wins as losses)
Negative balance (more losses than wins)

The following table shows Tanzania's all-time official international record per opponent:

Opponent	Pld	W	D	L	GF	GA	GD	PCT	Confederation
Algeria	3	1	0	2	3	9	−6	.333	CAF
Botswana	9	5	3	1	12	5	+7	.722	CAF
Burkina Faso	1	0	0	1	1	2	−1	.000	CAF
Burundi	3	2	0	1	11	2	+9	.667	CAF
Cameroon	4	1	0	3	3	8	−5	.250	CAF
Comoros	1	1	0	0	3	0	+3	1.000	CAF
Congo	1	0	1	0	1	1	0	.500	CAF
DR Congo	4	2	1	1	7	5	+2	.625	CAF
Equatorial Guinea	2	1	1	0	4	2	+2	.750	CAF
Eritrea	8	5	3	0	25	11	+14	.813	CAF
Ethiopia	10	4	3	3	15	10	+5	.550	CAF
Ghana	3	0	1	2	2	6	−4	.167	CAF
Ivory Coast	4	1	0	3	3	5	−2	.250	CAF
Kenya	5	2	2	1	5	5	0	.600	CAF
Malawi	6	5	1	0	10	1	+9	.917	CAF
Mali	3	0	1	2	4	6	−2	.167	CAF
Mauritania	1	1	0	0	7	0	+7	1.000	CAF
Morocco	4	0	0	4	3	14	−11	.000	CAF
Namibia	5	3	0	2	12	8	+4	.600	CAF
Nigeria	3	0	0	3	1	8	−7	.000	CAF
Russia	1	0	0	1	1	4	−3	.000	UEFA
Rwanda	2	1	0	1	3	3	0	.500	CAF
Senegal	1	0	1	0	1	1	0	.500	CAF
South Africa	12	1	2	9	9	35	−26	.167	CAF
South Sudan	5	5	0	0	21	0	+21	1.000	CAF
Togo	2	1	0	1	3	2	+1	.500	CAF
Tunisia	2	1	1	0	6	1	+5	.750	CAF
Uganda	5	4	0	1	12	5	+7	.800	CAF
Zambia	10	2	4	4	16	16	0	.400	CAF
Zanzibar	2	2	0	0	19	0	+19	1.000	—
Zimbabwe	11	2	3	6	9	26	−17	.318	CAF
Total	133	53	28	52	232	201	+31	.504	

== Results ==
[Non-FIFA]: Match not recognized as a FIFA-sanctioned international match and therefore does not count towards the FIFA Women's World Ranking.

=== 2002 ===
10 August 2002 African Championship Qualifying	Eritrea	2–3	Tanzania	Asmara, Eritrea

24 August 2002 African Championship Qualifying	Tanzania	2–2	Eritrea	Dar es Salaam, Tanzania

21 September 2002 African Championship Qualifying	Tanzania	0–5	Zimbabwe	Dar es Salaam, Tanzania

13 October 2002 African Championship Qualifying	Zimbabwe	5–0	Tanzania	Harare, Zimbabwe

=== 2004 ===
29 May 2004 African Championship Qualifying	Tanzania	4–0	Eritrea	Dar es Salaam, Tanzania

12 June 2004 African Championship Qualifying	Eritrea	1–1	Tanzania	Asmara, Eritrea

11 July 2004 African Championship Qualifying	Tanzania	0–3	Zimbabwe	Dar es Salaam, Tanzania

11 July 2004 African Championship Qualifying	Zimbabwe	4–0	Tanzania	Harare, Zimbabwe

=== 2006 ===
23 July 2006 African Championship Qualifying	South Africa	3–0	Tanzania	Johannesburg, South Africa

4 August 2006 African Championship Qualifying	Tanzania	0–4	South Africa	Dar es Salaam, Tanzania

=== 2007 ===
30 November 2008 African Championship Qualifying	Eritrea	2–3	Tanzania	Asmara, Ethiopia

16 December 2008 African Championship Qualifying	Tanzania	1–0	Eritrea	Dar es Salaam, Tanzania

=== 2008 ===
23 February 2008 African Championship Qualifying	Tanzania	0–3	Cameroon	Dar es Salaam, Tanzania

8 March 2008 African Championship Qualifying	Cameroon	2–1	Tanzania	Yaoundé, Cameroon

=== 2010 ===
6 March 2010 African Championship Qualifying	Ethiopia	1–3	Tanzania	Addis Ababa, Ethiopia

20 March 2010 African Championship Qualifying	Tanzania	1–1	Ethiopia	Dar es Salaam, Tanzania

23 May 2010 African Championship Qualifying	Tanzania	8–1	Eritrea	Dar es Salaam, Tanzania

5 June 2010 African Championship Qualifying	Eritrea	3–3	Tanzania	Asmara, Eritrea

24 July International friendly	South Africa	6–0	Tanzania	Johannesburg, South Africa

25 October International friendly	Botswana	2–3	Tanzania	Gaborone, Botswana

26 October International friendly	Botswana	1–1	Tanzania	Gaborone, Botswana

31 October 2010 African Championship GS	South Africa	2–1	Tanzania	Daveyton, South Africa

4 November 2010 African Championship GS	Mali	3–2	Tanzania	Daveyton, South Africa

7 November 2010 African Championship GS	Tanzania	0–3	Nigeria	Daveyton, South Africa

=== 2011 ===
2 July 2011 COSAFA Championship GS	Botswana	1–3	Tanzania	Harare, Zimbabwe

3 July 2011 COSAFA Championship GS	Tanzania	2–0	Zambia	Harare, Zimbabwe

5 July 2011 COSAFA Championship GS	South Africa	1–0	Tanzania	Harare, Zimbabwe

6 July 2011 COSAFA Championship SF	Zimbabwe	0–0 (4–2 p)	Tanzania	Harare, Zimbabwe

8 July 2011 COSAFA Championship	Tanzania	3–0	Malawi	Harare, Zimbabwe

5 September 2011 All-Africa Games GS	Tanzania	1–2	Ghana	Maputo, Mozambique

8 September 2011 All-Africa Games GS	South Africa	2–2	Tanzania	Maputo, Mozambique

11 September 2011 All-Africa Games GS	Tanzania	2–2	Zimbabwe	Maputo, Mozambique

=== 2012 ===
14 January 2012 African Championship Qualifying	Namibia	0–2	Tanzania	Windhoek, Namibia

29 January 2012 African Championship Qualifying	Tanzania	5–2	Namibia	Dar es Salaam, Tanzania

12 May International friendly	Tanzania	1–4	Zimbabwe	Dar es Salaam, Tanzania

20 May International friendly	Tanzania	2–5	South Africa	Dar es Salaam, Tanzania

27 May 2012 African Championship Qualifying	Ethiopia	2–1	Tanzania	Addis Ababa, Ethiopia

16 June 2012 African Championship Qualifying	Tanzania	0–1	Ethiopia	Dar es Salaam, Tanzania

=== 2014 ===
14 February 2014 African Championship Qualifying	Zambia	2–1	Tanzania	Lusaka, Zambia
15:00 UTC+2	Mubanga 78'; Zulu 82'		Minja 90'	Stadium: Nkoloma Stadium; Referee: Salima Mukansanga (Rwanda)

28 February 2014 African Championship Qualifying	Tanzania	1–1	Zambia	Dar es Salaam, Tanzania
15:00 UTC+3	Rashid 39'		S. Banda 80'	Stadium: Benjamin Mkapa National Stadium; Referee: Inès Niyonsaba (Burundi)

31 August International friendly	South Africa	6–1	Tanzania	Polokwane, South Africa
15:00 UTC+2	Nogwanya 21'; Smeda 29'; Van Wyk 53'; Ngubane 78', 82'; Mollo 89'	Report	Mwasikili 15'	Stadium: Peter Mokaba Stadium

=== 2015 ===
22 March 2015 African Games qualifying	Zambia	2–4	Tanzania	Lusaka, Zambia
15:00 UTC+2	Zulu 44'; Chanda 69'	Report	Rashid 50', 77'; Mafuru 59'; Mwasikili 89'	Stadium: Nkoloma Stadium; Referee: Damaris Wangari Kimani (Kenya)

10 April 2015 African Games qualifying	Tanzania	2–3	Zambia	Dar es Salaam, Tanzania
16:30 UTC+3	Rashid 3'; Shurua 29'	Report	Chanda 53'; Lungu 61' (pen.); Zulu 89'	Stadium: National Stadium; Referee: Anna Akoyi (Uganda)

23 August International friendly	Tanzania	1–1	Kenya	Zanzibar City, Tanzania
20:00 UTC+1		Report		Stadium: Amaan Stadium

6 September 2015 African Games GS	Tanzania	0–1	Ivory Coast	Brazzaville, Congo
17:00 UTC+1		Report	Niamien 48'	Stadium: Stade Municipal de Kintélé; Referee: Fatou Thioune (Senegal)

9 September 2015 African Games GS	Nigeria	3–0	Tanzania	Brazzaville, Congo
17:00 UTC+1	Oparanozie 13', 46'; Sunday 51'	Report		Stadium: Stade Alphonse Massemba-Débat; Referee: Salima Mukansanga (Rwanda)

12 September 2015 African Games GS	Congo	1–1	Tanzania	Brazzaville, Congo
17:00 UTC+1	Mbondzo 45'	Report	Mafuru 53'	Stadium: Stade Municipal de Kintélé; Referee: Jeanne Ekoumou (Cameroon)

7 November International friendly	Tanzania	2–0	Malawi	Dar es Salaam, Tanzania
16:00 UTC+2		Report		Stadium: Chamazi Stadium

=== 2016 ===
4 March 2016 WAfCON Qualifying	Tanzania	1–2	Zimbabwe	Dar es Salaam, Tanzania
16:00 UTC+3	Shurua 17'	Report	Jeke 20', 48'	Stadium: Chamazi Stadium; Referee: Tsege Sisay (Ethiopia)

20 March 2016 WAfCON Qualifying	Zimbabwe	1–1	Tanzania	Harare, Zimbabwe
15:00 UTC+2	Kaitano 11'	Report	Minja 4' (pen.)	Stadium: Rufaro Stadium; Referee: Letticia Viana (Swaziland)

12 September 2016 CECAFA Championship GS	Tanzania	3–2	Rwanda	Njeru, Uganda
16:00 UTC+3	Rashid 5', 75'; Athumani 30'	Report	Ibangarye 35'; Katunzi 39' (o.g.)	Stadium: FUFA Technical Center; Referee: Anna Akoyi (Uganda)

16 September 2016 CECAFA Championship GS	Ethiopia	0–0	Tanzania	Njeru, Uganda
16:00 UTC+3		Report		Stadium: FUFA Technical Center; Referee: Suavis Iratunga (Burundi)

18 September 2016 CECAFA Championship SF	Tanzania	4–1	Uganda	Njeru, Uganda
16:00 UTC+3	Minja 4'; Shurua 14'; Athumani 28'; Rashid 46'	Report	Nassuna 89'	Stadium: FUFA Technical Center; Referee: Suavis Iratunga (Burundi)

20 September 2016 CECAFA Championship Final	Kenya	1–2	Tanzania	Njeru, Uganda
15:30 UTC+3	Akida 48'	Report	Shurua 27'; Athumani 44'	Stadium: FUFA Technical Center; Referee: Anna Akoyi (Uganda)

10 November Friendly [Non-FIFA]	Cameroon	2–0	Tanzania	Yaoundé, Cameroon
15:00 UTC+1	Nchout 35'; Ngono Mani 70'	Report		Stadium: Ahmadou Ahidjo Stadium

13 November Friendly [Non-FIFA]	Cameroon	1–2	Tanzania	Yaoundé, Cameroon
17:30 UTC+1	Nkada 38'	Report	Shurua 42', 45+3'	Stadium: Ahmadou Ahidjo Stadium

=== 2018 ===
4 April 2018 WAfCON Qualifying	Tanzania	3–3	Zambia	Dar es Salaam, Taznania
16:00 UTC+3	Athumani 1'; Rashid 22', 47'	Report	B. Banda 25', 78'; Zulu 46'	Stadium: National Stadium; Referee: Lare Lamngar (Chad)

8 April 2018 WAfCON Qualifying	Zambia	1–1	Tanzania	Lusaka, Zambia
15:00 UTC+2	Kundananji 2'	Report	Minja 71'	Stadium: Nkoloma Stadium; Referee: Lidya Tafesse (Ethiopia)

19 July 2018 CECAFA Championship	Rwanda	1–0	Tanzania	Kigali, Rwanda
16:15 UTC+2	Kalimba 37'	Report		Stadium: Kigali Stadium

21 July 2018 CECAFA Championship	Kenya	1–1	Tanzania	Kigali, Rwanda
16:15 UTC+2	Shikobe 21'	Report	Minja 13'	Stadium: Kigali Stadium

23 July 2018 CECAFA Championship	Uganda	1–4	Tanzania	Kigali, Rwanda
14:00 UTC+2		Report	Rashid 18', 44'; Minja 23'; Hamza 52'	Stadium: Kigali Stadium

27 July 2018 CECAFA Championship	Ethiopia	1–4	Tanzania	Kigali, Rwanda
14:00 UTC+2	Abera 29'	Report	Shurua 45'; Minja 57'; Athumani 60'; Swaleh 90+2'	Stadium: Kigali Stadium

=== 2019 ===
5 April 2020 Summer Olympic qualifying	Tanzania	2–2	DR Congo	Dar es Salaam, Tanzania
18:00 UTC+3	Minja 47'; Rashid 79'	Report	Kasaj 12'; Mfwamba 54'	Stadium: National Stadium

9 April 2020 Summer Olympic qualifying	DR Congo	1–0	Tanzania	Kinshasa, D.R. Congo
16:30 UTC+1	Mfwamba 45'	Report		Stadium: Stade des Martyrs

16 November 2019 CECAFA Championship [Non-FIFA]	Tanzania	9–0	South Sudan	Dar es Salaam, Tanzania
16:30 UTC+3	Shurua 17', 41', 46'; Minja 32'; Athumani 47', 50'; Singano 52'; Clement 87', 90'	Report		Stadium: Azam Complex Stadium

18 November 2019 CECAFA Championship [Non-FIFA]	Burundi	0–4	Tanzania	Dar es Salaam, Tanzania
16:30 UTC+3		Report	Minja 36', 65'; Rashid 72'; Shurua 86'	Stadium: Azam Complex Stadium; Referee: Shamirah Nabadda (Uganda)

20 November 2019 CECAFA Championship [Non-FIFA]	Tanzania	7–0	Zanzibar	Dar es Salaam, Tanzania
16:30 UTC+3	Minja 25', 56'; Msewa 31'; Kizima 71'; Rashid 85', 87'; Katunzi 90'	Report		Stadium: Azam Complex Stadium

23 November 2019 CECAFA Championship [Non-FIFA]	Tanzania	1–0	Uganda	Dar es Salaam, Tanzania
16:00 UTC+3	Rashid 90+2'	Report		Stadium: Azam Complex Stadium

25 November 2019 CECAFA Championship [Non-FIFA]	Tanzania	0–2	Kenya	Dar es Salaam, Tanzania
16:00 UTC+3		Report	Shikangwa 71' (pen.), 88'	Stadium: Azam Complex Stadium

=== 2020 ===
14 February 2020 UNAF Tournament [Non-FIFA]	Tanzania	7–0	Mauritania	Le Kram, Tunisia
11:00 UTC+1	Bilali 8'; Clement 13'; Hamza 23', 45'; Lunyamila 28'; Shurua 29', 38'	Report		Stadium: Le Kram Stadium

16 February 2020 UNAF Tournament [Non-FIFA]	Algeria	2–3	Tanzania	Le Kram, Tunisia
11:00 UTC+1	Dellidj 22'; Affak 45'	Report	Shurua 11', 45+2'; Msewa 90+3'	Stadium: Le Kram Stadium

18 February 2020 UNAF Tournament [Non-FIFA]	Tanzania	2–3	Morocco	Le Kram, Tunisia
13:00 UTC+1	Shurua 1'; Singano 75'	Report	Addi 8' (pen.); Amani 44'; Mssoudy 68'	Stadium: Le Kram Stadium

22 February 2020 UNAF Tournament [Non-FIFA]	Tunisia	1–1	Tanzania	Le Kram, Tunisia
13:00 UTC+1	Houij 5'	Report	Masaka 68'	Stadium: Le Kram Stadium

4 November 2020 COSAFA Championship GS	Zimbabwe	0–1	Tanzania	Gqeberha, South Africa
14:30 UTC+2	Msipa (yellow card) (yellow-red card) 74'	Report	Shekigenda 60'	Stadium: Isaac Wolfson Stadium

7 November 2020 COSAFA Championship GS	Botswana	1–0	Tanzania	Gqeberha, South Africa
11:30 UTC+2	Thanda 48'	Report		Stadium: Isaac Wolfson Stadium; Referee: Ema Novo (Mozambique)

=== 2021 ===
29 September 2021 COSAFA Championship GS	Tanzania	3–0	Zimbabwe	Gqeberha, South Africa
15:30 UTC+2	Minja 42'; Shurua 51'; Masaka 90+1'	Report		Stadium: Nelson Mandela Bay Stadium; Referee: Akhona Makalima (South Africa)

2 October 2021 COSAFA Championship GS	Botswana	0–2	Tanzania	Gqeberha, South Africa
12:00 UTC+2		Report	Minja 5'; Shurua 79'	Stadium: NMU Stadium; Referee: Mercy Kayira (Malawi)

4 October 2021 COSAFA Championship GS	Tanzania	3–0	South Sudan	Gqeberha, South Africa
12:00 UTC+2	Athumani 52', 80', 90+1'	Report		Stadium: NMU Stadium; Referee: Mercy Mayimbo (Zimbabwe)

7 October 2021 COSAFA Championship SF	Tanzania	1–1 (3–2 p)	Zambia	Gqeberha, South Africa
12:00 UTC+2	Mweemba 17' (o.g.)	Report	Chanda 69'	Stadium: Nelson Mandela Bay Stadium; Referee: Mercy Kayira (Malawi)
	Penalties
	Kasonga (penalty scored); Bilali (penalty missed); Issa (penalty scored); Clement (penalty scored)		(penalty scored) Mupeso; (penalty missed) Belemu; (penalty scored) Musesa; (penalty missed) Mweemba; (penalty missed) Oseke

9 October 2021 COSAFA Championship Final	Tanzania	1–0	Malawi	Gqeberha, South Africa
15:00 UTC+2	Kasonga 64'	Report		Stadium: Nelson Mandela Bay Stadium; Referee: Antsino Twanyanyukwa (Namibia)

20 October 2022 WAfCON Qualifying	Tanzania	1–2	Namibia	Dar es Salaam, Tanzania
16:00 UTC+3	Athumani 41'	Report	Coleman 22', 61'	Stadium: National Stadium; Referee: Lidya Tafesse (Ethiopia)

23 October 2022 WAfCON Qualifying	Namibia	3–2	Tanzania	Johannesburg, South Africa
15:30 UTC+2	Coleman 16', 21', 43'	Report	Shurua 8'; Clement 58'	Stadium: Dobsonville Stadium; Referee: Nteboheleng Setoko (Lesotho)

=== 2022 ===
2 June 2022 CECAFA Championship GS	Tanzania	2–0	South Sudan	Njeru, Uganda
16:00 UTC+3	Bilali 39'; Msewa 90+3'	Report		Stadium: FUFA Technical Centre; Referee: Aline Umuton (Rwanda)

4 June 2022 CECAFA Championship GS	Ethiopia	2–2	Tanzania	Njeru, Uganda
13:00 UTC+3	Abera 9'; Temesgen 64'	Report	Clement 23'; Kasonga 78' (pen.)	Stadium: FUFA Technical Centre; Referee: Suavis Iratunga (Burundi)

6 June 2022 CECAFA Championship [Non-FIFA]	Tanzania	12–0	Zanzibar	Njeru, Uganda
16:00 UTC+3	Clement 1', 32', 59', 85'; Pangamwene 21'; Msewa 22'; Lunyamila 29'; Shurua 48', 61', 81'; Mbunda 50'; Mabanza 60'	Report		Stadium: FUFA Technical Centre

9 June 2022 CECAFA Championship SF	Tanzania	1–2	Burundi	Njeru, Uganda
12:00 UTC+3	Clement 1'	Report	Djafari 13'; Niyonkuru 78' (pen.)	Stadium: FUFA Technical Centre

11 June 2022 CECAFA Championship	Ethiopia	2–1	Tanzania	Njeru, Uganda
12:00 UTC+3	Tadesse 9', 26'	Report	Clement 78'	Stadium: FUFA Technical Centre; Referee: Diana Murungi (Uganda)

2 September 2022 COSAFA Championship GS	Tanzania	3–0	Comoros	Gqeberha, South Africa
12:00 UTC+2	Minja 14'; Lunyamila 42', 51'	Report		Stadium: NMU Stadium

5 September 2022 COSAFA Championship GS	Botswana	0–0	Tanzania	Gqeberha, South Africa
15:30 UTC+2		Report		Stadium: NMU Stadium

7 September 2022 COSAFA Championship GS	Tanzania	3–1	Malawi	Gqeberha, South Africa
15:30 UTC+2	Minja 20'; Msewa 45'; Clement 59'	Report	Simwaka 65'	Stadium: NMU Stadium

9 September 2022 COSAFA Championship SF	Zambia	2–1	Tanzania	Gqeberha, South Africa
12:00 UTC+2	B. Banda 12'; Zulu 46'	Report	Mweemba 28' (o.g.)	Stadium: Wolfson Stadium

11 September 2022 COSAFA Championship	Tanzania	2–1	Namibia	Gqeberha, South Africa
12:00 UTC+2	Bahera 12'; Naris 88' (o.g.)	Report	Mnunka 20' (o.g.)	Stadium: Wolfson Stadium

=== 2023 ===
9 April Friendly [Non-FIFA]	Algeria	4–0	Tanzania	Algiers, Algeria
22:30 UTC+1	Dafeur 23'; Karchouni 37', 67'; Belkhiter 80'	Report		Stadium: Nelson Mandela Stadium

11 April Friendly [Non-FIFA]	Algeria	3–0	Tanzania	Algiers, Algeria
22:30 UTC+1	Boutaleb 29'; Benaichouche 47'; Guellati 82' (pen.)	Report		Stadium: FAF National Technical Centre

11 June International friendly	Zambia	1–0	Tanzania	Lusaka, Zambia
15:00 UTC+2	Selemani 69'	Report		Stadium: Woodlands Stadium

7 July International friendly	Uganda	3–1	Tanzania	Kampala, Uganda
14:00 UTC+1	Nagadya 31'; Najjemba 86'; Kunihira 88'	Report	Clement 2'	Stadium: MTN Omondi Stadium

22 September 2024 WAfCON Qualifying	Ivory Coast	2–0	Tanzania	Yamoussoukro, Côte d'Ivoire
15:30 UTC+0	Abrogoua 48'; Guehai 55'	Report		Stadium: Stade de Yamoussoukro; Referee: Ghada Mehat (Algeria)

26 September 2024 WAfCON Qualifying	Tanzania	2–0 (4–2 p)	Ivory Coast	Dar es Salaam, Tanzania
16:00 UTC+3	Minja 50'; Clement 52'	Report		Stadium: Azam Complex Stadium
	Penalties
	Mabanza (penalty scored); Katunzi (penalty scored); Kasonga (penalty missed); Minja (penalty scored); Clement (penalty scored)		(penalty scored) Diakité; (penalty missed) Kpaho; (penalty scored) Guehai; (penalty missed) Kakounan

26 October 2024 Summer Olympic qualifying	Tanzania	2–0	Botswana	Dar es Salaam, Tanzania
16:00 UTC+3	Clement 2' (pen.); Masaka 89'	Report		Stadium: Azam Complex Stadium

31 October 2024 Summer Olympic qualifying	Botswana	0–1	Tanzania	Gaborone, Botswana
18:00 UTC+2		Report	Masaka 26'	Stadium: Botswana National Stadium

30 November 2024 WAfCON Qualifying	Tanzania	3–0	Togo	Dar es Salaam, Tanzania
16:00 UTC+3	Clement 45', 81'; Konou 50' (o.g.)	Report		Stadium: Azam Complex Stadium

5 December 2024 WAfCON Qualifying	Togo	2–0	Tanzania	Lomé, Togo
17:00 UTC+1	Undefined 69' (o.g.); Gnintegma 90+8'	Report		Stadium: Stade de Kégué

=== 2024 ===
23 February 2024 Summer Olympic qualifying	Tanzania	0–3	South Africa	Dar es Salaam, Tanzania
16:00 UTC+3		Report	Seoposenwe 10'; Kgatlana 58'; Magaia 86'	Stadium: Azam Complex Stadium

27 February 2024 Summer Olympic qualifying	South Africa	1–0	Tanzania	Mbombela, South Africa
16:00 UTC+3	Kgatlana 58'	Report		Stadium: Mbombela Stadium

29 May Friendly [Non-FIFA]	Tanzania	3–0	South Sudan	Dar es Salaam, Tanzania
19:00 UTC+3	Clement 36'; Masaka 37', 56'	Report		Stadium: Azam Complex Stadium

31 May Friendly [Non-FIFA]	Tanzania	2–2	Mali	Dar es Salaam, Tanzania
19:00 UTC+3	Masaka 31'; Kabambo 68'	Report	A. Diarra 4'; A. Traoré 29'	Stadium: Azam Complex Stadium

11 July Friendly [Non-FIFA]	Tunisia	0–5	Tanzania	Ariana, Tunisia
19:00 UTC+3		Report	Mnunka 16', 28', 63'; Clement 41'; Minja 90+4'	Stadium: Ariana Municipal Stadium; Referee: Dorsaf Ganouati (Tunisia)

13 July Friendly [Non-FIFA]	Botswana	0–0	Tanzania	Ariana, Tunisia
19:00 UTC+3		Report		Stadium: Ariana Municipal Stadium

25 October Friendly [Non-FIFA]	Morocco	4–1	Tanzania	Casablanca, Morocco
19:00 UTC+1	Jraïdi 27'; Bahera 56' (o.g.); Chebbak 73'; Chapelle 78'	Report	Kasonga 42'	Stadium: Père Jégo Stadium; Referee: Yacine Samassa (Mauritania)

27 October Friendly [Non-FIFA]	Senegal	1–1	Tanzania	Mohammedia, Morocco
18:00 UTC+1	N. Ndiaye 90'	Report	Clement 45+4'	Stadium: El Bachir Stadium; Referee: Sabah Sadir (Morocco)

=== 2025 ===
20 February 2026 WAfCON Qualifying	Tanzania	3–1	Equatorial Guinea	Dar es Salaam, Tanzania
16:00 UTC+3	Athumani 49'; Kasonga 55'; Msewa 90+1'	Report	Midje 42'	Stadium: Azam Complex Stadium; Referee: Zouwaira Souley Sani (Niger)

26 February 2026 WAfCON Qualifying	Equatorial Guinea	1–1	Tanzania	Malabo, Equatorial Guinea
19:00 UTC+1	Chuigoué 9'	Report	Kasonga 73'	Stadium: Estadio de Malabo; Referee: Mercy Mayimbo (Zimbabwe)

30 May Friendly [Non-FIFA]	Tanzania	2–1	DR Congo	Dar es Salaam, Tanzania
18:00 UTC+3	Luvanga 28', 88'	Report	Dikisha 71'	Stadium: Azam Complex Stadium

3 June Friendly [Non-FIFA]	Tanzania	3–1	DR Congo	Dar es Salaam, Tanzania
20:00 UTC+3	Clement 28'; Singano 44'; Luvanga 48'	Report	Dikisha 89'	Stadium: Azam Complex Stadium

13 June 2025 CECAFA Championship [Non-FIFA]	South Sudan	0–4	Tanzania	Dar es Salaam, Tanzania
19:00 UTC+3		Report	Msewa 9'; Clement 35', 64'; Luvanga 69'	Stadium: Azam Complex Stadium; Referee: Joselyne Nsabimana (Burundi)

17 June 2025 CECAFA Championship [Non-FIFA]	Tanzania	6–0	Burundi	Dar es Salaam, Tanzania
16:00 UTC+3	Clement 8', 31'; Mnunduka 65'; Luvanga 70'; Msewa 73'; Athumani 79'	Report		Stadium: Azam Complex Stadium; Referee: Diana Murungi (Uganda)

19 June 2025 CECAFA Championship [Non-FIFA]	Uganda	0–2	Tanzania	Dar es Salaam, Tanzania
19:00 UTC+3		Report	Clement 21'; Msewa 83'	Stadium: Azam Complex Stadium; Referee: Lucy Juma (Kenya)

21 June 2025 CECAFA Championship [Non-FIFA]	Tanzania	1–0	Kenya	Dar es Salaam, Tanzania
18:00 UTC+3	Mango 49' (o.g.)	Report		Stadium: Azam Complex Stadium; Referee: Diana Murungi (Uganda)

28 June Friendly [Non-FIFA]	Morocco	4–0	Tanzania	Rabat, Morocco
20:30 UTC+1	Jraïdi 28' (pen.); Chebbak 45'; I. El Ghazouani 68'; Badri 76'	Report		Stadium: Rabat Olympic Stadium; Referee: Zakia El Grini (Morocco)

7 July 2024 WAfCON GS	Mali	1–0	Tanzania	Berkane, Morocco
20:00	S. Traoré 45+1'	Report		Stadium: Berkane Municipal Stadium; Referee: Aline Guimbang Etong (Cameroon)

11 July 2024 WAfCON GS	Tanzania	1–1	South Africa	Oujda, Morocco
20:00	Clement 24'	Report	Mbane 70'	Stadium: Honor Stadium; Referee: Natacha Konan (Ivory Coast)

14 July 2024 WAfCON GS	Ghana	4–1	Tanzania	Berkane, Morocco
20:00	Adubea 12'; Kusi 63' (pen.); Badu 87'; Boye-Hlorkah 90'	Report	Athumani 41'	Stadium: Berkane Municipal Stadium; Referee: Dorsaf Ganouati (Tunisia)

22 October 2026 WAfCON Qualifying	Tanzania	2–0	Ethiopia	Dar es Salaam, Tanzania
17:00 UTC+3	Mnunka 7'; Mnunduka 54'	Report		Stadium: Azam Complex Stadium; Referee: Aminata Fullah (Sierra Leone)

28 October 2026 WAfCON Qualifying	Ethiopia	0–1	Tanzania	Addis Ababa, Ethiopia
15:00 UTC+3		Report	Msewa 15'	Stadium: Abebe Bikila Stadium; Referee: Agnes Ngoma (Congo)

=== 2026 ===
28 February 2026 Pink Ladies Cup	Russia	4–1	Tanzania	Sharjah, United Arab Emirates
20:00 UTC+3	yuklyaeva 1'; Smirnova 43' (pen.), 65'; Lushnikova 82'	Report	Gerald 85'	Stadium: Al Hamriya Sports Club Stadium

13 April International friendly	Morocco	3–0	Tanzania	Rabat, Morocco
21:00 UTC+1	Mssoudy 4', 77'; M'rabet 80'	Report		Stadium: Moulay El Hassan Stadium

3 June Friendly [Non-FIFA]	Tanzania	1–0	Malawi	Dar es Salaam, Tanzania
14:00 UTC+2	Katunzi 48'	Report		Stadium: KMC Complex

6 June Friendly [Non-FIFA]	Tanzania	0–0	Malawi	Dar es Salaam, Tanzania
15:00 UTC+2		Report		Stadium: KMC Complex

20 July Friendly [Non-FIFA]	Ghana	0–0	Tanzania	Casablanca, Morocco
20:00 UTC+3		Report		Stadium: LANORIA Field

23 July Friendly [Non-FIFA]	Nigeria	2–1	Tanzania	Casablanca, Morocco
20:00 UTC+3	Ajibade 14'; Okoronkwo 88'	Report	Clement 79'	Stadium: LANORIA Field

27 July 2026 WAfCON GS	South Africa	1–2	Tanzania	Casablanca, Morocco
18:00 UTC+1	Mbane 45+2'	Report	Msewa 37'; Ubamba 87'	Stadium: Moulay Rachid Stadium; Referee: Shahenda El Maghrabi (Egypt)

31 July 2026 WAfCON GS	Burkina Faso	2–1	Tanzania	Casablanca, Morocco
21:00 UTC+1	Kabré 43'; B. Sawadogo 80'	Report	Ubamba (red card) 55'; Mnunka 62'	Stadium: Larbi Zaouli Stadium; Referee: Yacine Samassa (Mauritania)

4 August 2026 WAfCON GS	Tanzania	1–2	Ivory Coast	Casablanca, Morocco
21:00 UTC+1	Msewa 90+9' (pen.)	Report	Ouedraogo 44'; Konan 68' (pen.)	Stadium: Larbi Zaouli Stadium; Referee: Antsino Twanyanyukwa (Namibia)

== See also ==
- Tanzania women's national football team
- Tanzania national football team results
