= Burundi women's national football team results =

Burundi women's national football team all-time results

The Burundi women's national football team is the representative women's association football team of Burundi. Its governing body is the Football Federation of Burundi (FBF) and it competes as a member of the Confederation of African Football (CAF).

The national team has never participated in an official FIFA-sanctioned match or the Women's World Cup. Despite initially preparing for the qualification tournament for the 2007 Cup, the team did not compete in the event and has withdrawn from various other competitions. In 2008, Burundi was set to play in the African Women's Championship but withdrew, granting automatic qualification to the DR the Congo. The team also withdrew from the 2010 and 2012 editions of the Africa Women's Cup of Nations before the first-round qualifiers. Burundi first international game was on 8 September 2016 when they faced Tanzania in a friendly match as preparation for their debut in the CECAFA Women's Championship. in 2022, Burundi qualified for the Africa Women's Cup of Nations in their first try. Burundi is currently ranked 177th in the FIFA Women's World Rankings.

== Record per opponent ==
Key

Positive balance (more wins than losses)
Neutral balance (as many wins as losses)
Negative balance (more losses than wins)

The following table shows Burundi' all-time official international record per opponent:

Opponent	Pld	W	D	L	GF	GA	GD	W%	Confederation
Algeria	2	0	0	2	1	6	−5	00.00	CAF
Botswana	1	0	0	1	2	4	−2	00.00	CAF
Djibouti	3	3	0	0	14	1	+13	100.00	CAF
Eritrea	2	2	0	0	6	0	+6	100.00	CAF
Ethiopia	2	0	2	0	2	2	0	00.00	CAF
Kenya	2	0	0	2	0	4	−9	00.00	CAF
Nigeria	1	0	0	1	0	4	−4	00.00	CAF
Rwanda	3	2	1	0	4	2	+2	66.67	CAF
South Africa	1	0	0	1	1	3	−2	00.00	CAF
South Sudan	1	1	0	0	3	0	+3	100.00	CAF
Tanzania	3	1	0	2	2	8	−6	33.33	CAF
Uganda	4	0	0	4	2	10	−8	00.00	CAF
Zanzibar	2	2	0	0	15	1	+14	100.00	CECAFA
Total	27	11	3	13	52	45	+7	40.74	—

== Results ==
=== 2016 ===
8 September 2016 Friendly	Tanzania	3–0	Burundi	Bukoba, Tanzania
14:00 UTC+3		Report (TFF)

11 September 2016 2016 CECAFA Women's Championship Group A	Zanzibar	1–10	Burundi	Njeru, Uganda
14:00 UTC+3	Abdullahi 36' (pen.)	Report	Uwimeza 19', 42', 51'; Misigiyimana 21'; Uwimana 35'; J. Bukuru 39'; Mumezero 44', 66'; Saidi 63', 89'	Stadium: FUFA Technical Centre; Referee: Carolyne Wanjala (Kenya)

13 September 2016 2016 CECAFA Women's Championship Group A	Burundi	0–4	Kenya	Njeru, Uganda
14:00 UTC+3		Report	Atieno 30', 46'; Kinuthia 33'; Akida 45'	Stadium: FUFA Technical Centre

15 September 2016 2016 CECAFA Women's Championship Group A	Uganda	1–0	Burundi	Njeru, Uganda
16:00 UTC+3	Ikwaput 45+2'	Report		Stadium: FUFA Technical Centre

=== 2019 ===
16 November 2019 2019 CECAFA Women's Championship Group A	Burundi	5–0	Zanzibar	Mbagala, Tanzania
14:00 UTC+3	Saidi 24', 26'; Niyonkuru 50'; Mwadini 60' (o.g.); Uwimana 88'	Report (CECAFA)		Stadium: Chamazi Stadium

18 November 2019 2019 CECAFA Women's Championship Group A	Burundi	0–4	Tanzania	Mbagala, Tanzania
14:30 UTC+3		Report (CECAFA)	Minja 36', 56'; Rashid 78'; Shurua 86'	Stadium: Chamazi Stadium; Referee: Shamirah Namadda (Uganda)

20 November 2019 2019 CECAFA Women's Championship Group A	South Sudan	0–3	Burundi	Mbagala, Tanzania
14:00 UTC+3		Report	Adebo Vita 10' (o.g.); Saidi 54'; Irankunda 90+1'	Stadium: Chamazi Stadium

23 November 2019 2019 CECAFA Women's Championship SF	Kenya	5–0	Burundi	Mbagala, Tanzania
16:30 UTC+3	Nixon 14'; Shikangwa 45', 71'; Adam 68'; Corazone 77'	Report		Stadium: Chamazi Stadium

25 November 2019 2019 CECAFA Women's Championship 3rd place	Uganda	2–0	Burundi	Mbagala, Tanzania
14:00 UTC+3	Nababi 61'; Nalugya 85'	Report		Stadium: Chamazi Stadium

=== 2021 ===
20 October 2021 2022 AFWCON qualification First round 1st leg	Eritrea	0–5	Burundi	Asmara, Eritrea
16:00 UTC+3		Report (FIFA)	Uwimana 13'; Niyonkuru 20'; Djafari 24', 49' (pen.); Bukuru 81'	Stadium: Denden Stadium; Referee: Khamdallah El Shayeb (Sudan)

21 February 2022 2022 AFWCON qualification First round 2nd leg	Burundi	1–0 (6–0 agg.)	Eritrea	Asmara, Eritrea
15:00 UTC+3	Bukuru 21'	Report (FIFA)		Stadium: Denden Stadium; Referee: Asnakech Gebre (Ethiopia)
Note: Burundi won 6–0 on aggregate.

=== 2022 ===
16 February 2022 2022 AFWCON qualification Second round 1st leg	Burundi	6–1	Djibouti	Ngozi, Burundi
16:00 UTC+3	Bizimana 19', 43', 62'; Djafari 24'; Uwimana 45+3'; Niyonkuru 57'	Report (FIFA)	Abdo 33'	Stadium: Stade Urukundo; Referee: Shamirah Nabadda (Uganda)

21 February 2022 2022 AFWCON qualification Second round 2nd leg	Djibouti	0–5 (1–11 agg.)	Burundi	Ngozi, Burundi
15:00 UTC+3		Report (FIFA)	Bizimana 9', 54'; Uwimana 38', 86', 90+5'	Stadium: Stade Urukundo; Referee: Josephine Wanjiku (Kenya)
Note: Burundi won 11–1 on aggregate.

1 June 2022 2022 CECAFA Women's Championship Group A	Burundi	3–0	Djibouti	Njeru, Uganda
13:00 UTC+3	J. Bukuru 36'; Niyonkuru 38', 90+2'	Report	N. Nour (red card) 39'	Stadium: FUFA technical centre Referee: Florentina Zabron Chief (Tanzania)

3 June 2022 2022 CECAFA Women's Championship Group A	Burundi	2–1	Rwanda	Njeru, Uganda
16:00 UTC+3	Niyonkuru 13', 79' (pen.)	Report	Usanase 37'	Stadium: FUFA technical centre Referee: Misgana Tilahun (Ethiopia)

5 June 2022 2022 CECAFA Women's Championship Group A	Uganda	4–1	Burundi	Njeru, Uganda
16:00 UTC+3	Ikwaput 14'; Nalugya 47'; Nabweteme 79', 90+3'	Report	Nahimana 11'	Stadium: FUFA technical centre Referee: Tsehaynesh Abebe (Ethiopia)

9 June 2022 2022 CECAFA Women's Championship SF	Tanzania	1–2	Burundi	Njeru, Uganda
18:30 UTC+3	Clement 1'	Report	Yona 13' (o.g.); Niyonkuru 78' (pen.)	Stadium: FUFA Technical Centre

11 June 2022 2022 CECAFA Women's Championship Final	Uganda	3–1	Burundi	Njeru, Uganda
15:00 UTC+3	Nabweteme 2', 90+1'; Ikwaput 44'	Report	J. Bukuru 49'	Stadium: FUFA Technical Centre; Referee: Aline Umuton (Rwanda)

4 July 2022 2022 AFWCON GS	Burundi	2–4	Botswana	Rabat, Morocco
21:00 UTC+1	Niyonkuru 52', 81'	Report (FIFA); Report (CAF)	Dithebe 43'; Radiakanyo 47'; Tholakele 55', 60'	Stadium: Stade Moulay Hassan; Referee: Mame Faye (Senegal)

7 July 2022 2022 AFWCON GS	South Africa	3–1	Burundi	Rabat, Morocco
18:00 UTC+1	Kgatlana 20'; Motau 32'; Motlhalo 54' (pen.)	Report (FIFA); Report (CAF)	Uwimana 30'	Stadium: Stade Moulay Hassan; Referee: Shahenda El-Maghrabi (Egypt)

10 July 2022 2022 AFWCON GS	Nigeria	4–0	Burundi	Rabat, Morocco
21:00 UTC+1	Ajibade 25' (pen.); Efih 28'; Kanu 29', 46'	Report (FIFA); Report (CAF)		Stadium: Stade Moulay Hassan; Referee: Fatima El Ajjani (Morocco)

=== 2023 ===
15 September 2023 Friendly	Rwanda	0–1	Burundi	Nyamata, Rwanda
15:00 UTC+2		Report	Uwimana 23'	Stadium: Bugesera stadium

16 September 2023 Friendly	Rwanda	1–1	Burundi	Kigali, Rwanda
19:00 UTC+2	Uwase 28'		Zilfa 55'	Stadium: Kigali Pelé Stadium

22 September 2023 2024 AFWCON qualification First round 1st leg	Burundi	1–1	Ethiopia	Addis Ababa, Ethiopia
15:00 UTC+3	Kanyamuneza 49'	Report (EFF)	Asresahegn 38'	Stadium: Abebe Bikila Stadium

26 September 2023 2024 AFWCON qualification First round 2nd leg	Ethiopia	1–1 (2–2 agg.) (3–5 p)	Burundi	Addis Ababa, Ethiopia
15:30 UTC+3	Asresahegn 19'	Report (EFF)	Niyonkuru 49'	Stadium: Abebe Bikila Stadium
	Penalties
	Abera (penalty scored); Yien (penalty missed); Kalsa (penalty scored); Amare (penalty scored)		(penalty scored) Kanyamuneza; (penalty scored) R. Bukuru; (penalty scored) Nahimana; (penalty scored) Niyonkuru; (penalty scored) Djafari
Note: 2–2 on aggregate. Burundi won 5–3 on penalties.

30 November 2023 2024 AFWCON qualification Second round 1st leg	Algeria	5–1	Burundi	Algiers, Algeria
20:00 UTC+1	Boutaleb 32', 43', 67'; Boussaha 65'; Chebel 80'	Report (FAF)	Niyomwungere 29'	Stadium: Stade du 5 Juillet; Referee: Aline Guimbang A Etong (Cameroon)

5 December 2023 2024 AFWCON qualification Second round 2nd leg	Burundi	0–1 (1–6 agg.)	Algeria	Algiers, Algeria
15:00 UTC+3		Report (FAF)	Boutaleb 17'	Stadium: Stade du 5 Juillet; Referee: Dominique Hanjavola (Madagascar)
Note: Algeria won 6–1 on aggregate.
