= Djibouti women's national football team results =

The Djibouti women's national football team is the representative women's association football team of Djibouti. Its governing body is the Djiboutian Football Federation (FDF) and it competes as a member of the Confederation of African Football (CAF).

The national team's first activity was in 2006, when they played a friendly match against Kenya in which they lost 0–7. Djibouti is currently unranked in the FIFA Women's World Rankings.

== Record per opponent ==
Key

Positive balance (more wins than losses)
Neutral balance (as many wins as losses)
Negative balance (more losses than wins)

The following table shows Djibouti' all-time official international record per opponent:

Opponent	Pld	W	D	L	GF	GA	GD	W%	Confederation
Burundi	3	0	0	3	1	14	−13	0.00	CAF
Ethiopia	3	0	0	1	0	25	−25	0.00	CAF
Kenya	2	0	0	2	0	19	−19	0.00	CAF
Mauritania	1	1	0	0	3	1	+2	100.00	CAF
Mauritius	2	0	0	2	1	3	+2	0.00	CAF
Rwanda	1	0	0	1	0	2	−2	0.00	CAF
Somalia	1	1	0	0	4	1	+3	100.00	CAF
Togo	4	0	0	4	0	23	−23	0.00	CAF
Uganda	2	0	0	2	0	18	−18	0.00	CAF
Total	19	2	0	17	9	106	−97	10.93	—

== Results ==
=== 2006 ===
26 March 2006 Friendly	Kenya	7–0	Djibouti	Nairobi, Kenya
		Report

=== 2019 ===
30 July 2019 Friendly	Mauritania	1–3	Djibouti	Nouakchott, Mauritania
	Dioup (?)	Report	Abdo (?); Abdallah 34'; Abdillahi (?)	Stadium: Stade Cheikha Ould Boïdiya

10 November 2019 Friendly	Morocco U-20	6–0	Djibouti	Salé, Morocco

17 November 2019 CECAFA Women's Championship Group B	Uganda	13–0	Djibouti	Mbagala, Tanzania
14:30 UTC+3	Nalukenge 2', 16', 22', 45', 66'; Nassuna 18' (pen.), 32' (?); Ikwaput 40', 50', 62'; Najjemba 65'; Nababi (?)	Report		Stadium: Chamazi Stadium

19 November 2019 CECAFA Women's Championship Group B	Kenya	12–0	Djibouti	Mbagala, Tanzania
14:00 UTC+3	Nasaka 13'; Shikangwa 14', 17' (pen.), 56'; Adam 34'; Bundi 45'; Airo 53' (pen.), 61', 65'	Report		Stadium: Chamazi Stadium

21 November 2019 CECAFA Women's Championship Group B	Djibouti	0–8	Ethiopia	Mbagala, Tanzania
14:00 UTC+3		Report	Demise 11', 66'; Abaa 14'; Zergaw 64', 65', 88'; Abdi 71' (o.g.); Geremew 80'	Stadium: Chamazi Stadium

=== 2021 ===
18 February 2021 Friendly	Morocco U-20	3–1	Djibouti	Salé, Morocco
		Report

22 February 2021 Friendly	Morocco U-20	5–1	Djibouti	Salé, Morocco

20 October 2021 2022 AFWCON qualification First round 1st leg	Djibouti	Cancelled	Rwanda	Djibouti, Djibouti
		Report		Stadium: El Hadj Hassan Gouled Aptidon Stadium

26 October 2021 2022 AFWCON qualification First round 2nd leg	Rwanda	Cancelled	Djibouti	Kigali, Rwanda
		Report		Stadium: Nyamirambo Regional Stadium
Note: Djibouti won on walkover after Rwanda withdrew before the first leg citing lack of preparation due to no local championship being contested since 2018.

=== 2022 ===
16 February 2022 2022 AFWCON qualification Second round 1st leg	Burundi	6–1	Djibouti	Ngozi, Burundi
	Bizimana 19', 79'; Djafari 24'; Niyonkuru 40', 75'; Uwimana 45'	Report	Abdo 33'	Stadium: Stade Urukundo; Referee: Shamirah Nabadda (Uganda)

21 February 2022 2022 AFWCON qualification Second round 2nd leg	Djibouti	0–5 (1–11 agg.)	Burundi	Ngozi, Burundi
		Report	Bizimana 9', 54'; Uwimana 38', 86', 90+5'	Stadium: Stade Urukundo; Referee: Josephine Wanjiku (Kenya)
Note: Burundi won 11–1 on aggregate.

1 June 2022 CECAFA Women's Championship Group A	Burundi	3–0	Djibouti	Njeru, Uganda
13:00 UTC+3	Bukuru 36'; Niyonkuru 38', 90+2'	Report		Stadium: FUFA technical centre

3 June 2022 CECAFA Women's Championship Group A	Uganda	5–0	Djibouti	Njeru, Uganda
13:00 UTC+3	Nantongo 15'; Namirimu 43'; Nabweteme 48'; Nabbumba 51'; Ikwaput 66'	Report		Stadium: FUFA Technical Centre

5 June 2022 CECAFA Women's Championship Group A	Rwanda	2–0	Djibouti	Njeru, Uganda
13:00 UTC+3	Uzayisenga 11'; Ibangarye 21'	Report		Stadium: FUFA Technical Centre; Referee: Elizabeth Gisma Louis (South Sudan)

=== 2023 ===
22 September 2023 2024 AFWCON qualification First round 1st leg	Djibouti	0–7	Togo	Lomé, Togo
14:30 UTC+0		Report (FTF)	Woedikou 8', 47', 76', 90'; N'djambara 25'; Gnintegma 32'; Kayaba 76'	Stadium: Stade de Kégué

26 September 2023 2024 AFWCON qualification First round 2nd leg	Togo	6–0 (13–0 agg.)	Djibouti	Lomé, Togo
15:30 UTC+0	Woedikou 4', 15', 40'; Koudjoukalo 31', 89'; Adinda-Apko 66'	Report (FTF)		Stadium: Stade de Kégué
Note: Togo won 13–0 on aggregate.

=== 2025 ===
12 February 2025 Friendly	Ethiopia	10–0	Djibouti	Addis Ababa, Ethiopia
21:00 UTC+3	Muso (?); Daniel (?); Wakuma (?); Bizuneh (?); Bekele (?); Girma (?); Addisu (?); (?)			Stadium: Abebe Bikila Stadium

16 February 2025 Friendly	Ethiopia	7–0	Djibouti	Addis Ababa, Ethiopia
21:00 UTC+3	Wakuma (?); Daniel (?); Feleke (?); Kalsa (?); (?); Mitiku (?)			Stadium: Abebe Bikila Stadium

21 February 2025 2026 WAFCON qualifying	Djibouti	0–5	Togo	Lomé, Togo
16:00 UTC+0		Report	Woedikou 9', 58'; Gnintegma 45+1'; Dogli 47'; Sama 77'	Stadium: Stade de Kégué; Referee: Gloria Sambumba (Zambia)

26 February 2025 2026 WAFCON qualifying	Togo	5–0 (10–0 agg.)	Djibouti	Lomé, Togo
16:00 UTC+0	Sama 27'; N'djambara 58'; Gnintegma 81', 87'; Badate 85'	Report		Stadium: Stade de Kégué; Referee: Isatou Touray (The Gambia)
Note: Togo won 10–0 on aggregate.

24 October 2025 Friendly	Djibouti	4–1	Somalia	Djibouti City, Djibouti
16:00 UTC+3	Doubad 27', 68', 85'; Gouled 46'		Okiyaale 12'	Stadium: Académie de Douda

=== 2026 ===
4 June 2026 Olympic qualifying tournament	Mauritius	2–1	Djibouti	Saint Pierre, Mauritius
19:00 UTC+4	Clair 1'; Gopal 90+6' (pen.)	Report	Geremew 38'	Stadium: Côte d'Or National Sports Complex; Referee: Nonjabulo Nonhle Ndlela (South Africa)

8 June 2026 Olympic qualifying tournament	Djibouti	0–1	Mauritius	Saint Pierre, Mauritius
17:30 UTC+4		Report	Fourneau 75'	Stadium: Côte d'Or National Sports Complex; Referee: https://globalsportsarchive.com/en/soccer/match/2026-06-08/djibouti-vs-mauritius/4297200

== See also ==
- Djibouti national football team results
