= 2022 CECAFA Women's Championship =

Tournament details
- Host country: Uganda
- Dates: 1–11 June 2022
- Teams: 8 (from 1 sub-confederation)

Final positions
- Champions: Uganda (1st title)
- Runners-up: Burundi
- Third place: Ethiopia
- Fourth place: Tanzania

Tournament statistics
- Matches played: 16
- Goals scored: 59 (3.69 per match)
- Top scorer(s): (Tanzania) Opah Clement (7 goals)
- Best player: (Uganda) Fazila Ikwaput
- Best goalkeeper: (Uganda) Daisy Nakaziro
- Fair play award: Tanzania
- All statistics correct as of 11 June 2022.

The 2022 CECAFA Women's Championship is the 6th edition of the biennial association football tournament for women's national teams in the East Africa region organized by CECAFA. It is hosted by Uganda between 1 and 11 June 2022. Being one of the nations currently serving a FIFA suspension as a result of issues between the local FA and central government, the Kenya Harambe Starlets will not have an opportunity to defend the title

== Participants ==
The following 8 teams are set to contest in the tournament.

| Team | Appearances | Previous best performance |
|---|---|---|
| Burundi | 3rd | 4th place (2019) |
| Djibouti | 2nd | Group stage (2019) |
| Ethiopia | 4th | 3rd place (2016, 2018) |
| South Sudan | 2nd | Group stage (2019) |
| Tanzania | 4th | Champions (2016, 2018) |
| Uganda | 4th | Runner-up (2018) |
| Zanzibar | 4th | Champions (1986) |
| Rwanda | 3rd | 5th place (2018) |

=== Did not enter ===
- Kenya:suspended by FIFA
- Sudan
- Eritrea
- Somalia

== Venue ==
Uganda will host the Championship at the FUFA Technical Centre in Njeru .

== Draw ==
The draw will take place on May 11 at 10.00 am East Africa Time

== Officials ==
Referees

- (Burundi) Suavis Iratunga
- (Ethiopia) Tsehaynesh Abebe
- (Ethiopia) Misgana Tilahun
- (Rwanda) Aline Umuton
- (Tanzania) Florentina Zabron Chief
- (Tanzania) Tatu Nuru Malogo
- (South Sudan) Elizabeth Gisma Louis
- (Uganda) Shamirah Nabadda

Assistant Referees

- (Burundi) Alida Iradukunda
- (Burundi) Arcella Uwizer
- (Ethiopia) Woinshet Kassaye
- (Rwanda) Sandrine Murangwa
- (Rwanda) Alice Umutesi
- (Tanzania) Janet Balama
- (Uganda) Docus Atuhaire
- (Uganda) Nkumbi Nakitto

== Group stage ==
=== Group A ===
| Pos | Team | Pld | W | D | L | GF | GA | GD | Pts | Qualification |
|---|---|---|---|---|---|---|---|---|---|---|
| 1 | Uganda (H) | 3 | 3 | 0 | 0 | 11 | 1 | +10 | 9 | Semi-finals |
| 2 | Burundi | 3 | 2 | 0 | 1 | 6 | 5 | +1 | 6 | Semi-finals |
| 3 | Rwanda | 3 | 1 | 0 | 2 | 3 | 4 | −1 | 3 | |
| 4 | Djibouti | 3 | 0 | 0 | 3 | 0 | 10 | −10 | 0 | |

Source: Soccerway
(H) Hosts
1 June 2022
13:00

| Burundi | 3–0 | Djibouti |
|---|---|---|
| Bukuru 36'; Niyonkuru 38', 90+2' | Report |

FUFA Technical Centre, Njeru
Referee: Florentina Zabron Chief (Tanzania)
1 June 2022
16:00

| Uganda | 2–0 | Rwanda |
|---|---|---|
| Ikwaput 39', 49' | Report |

FUFA Technical Centre, Njeru
Referee: Tsehaynesh Abebe (Ethiopia)

3 June 2022
13:00

| Uganda | 5–0 | Djibouti |
|---|---|---|
| Nantongo 15'; Namirimu 43'; Nabweteme 48'; Nabbumba 51'; Ikwaput 66' | Report |

FUFA Technical Centre, Njeru
Referee: Tatu Nuru Malogo (Tanzania)
3 June 2022
16:00

| Burundi | 2–1 | Rwanda |
|---|---|---|
| Niyonkuru 13', 79' (pen.) | Report | Usanase 37' |

FUFA Technical Centre, Njeru
Referee: Misgana Tilahun (Ethiopia)

5 June 2022
13:00

| Rwanda | 2–0 | Djibouti |
|---|---|---|
| Uzayisenga 11'; Ibangarye 21' | Report |

FUFA Technical Centre, Njeru
Referee: Elizabeth Gisma Louis (South Sudan)
5 June 2022
16:00

| Uganda | 4–1 | Burundi |
|---|---|---|
| Ikwaput 14'; Nalugya 47'; Nabweteme 79', 90+3' | Report | Nahimana 11' |

FUFA Technical Centre, Njeru
Referee: Tsehaynesh Abebe (Ethiopia)

=== Group B ===
| Pos | Team | Pld | W | D | L | GF | GA | GD | Pts | Qualification |
|---|---|---|---|---|---|---|---|---|---|---|
| 1 | Tanzania | 3 | 2 | 1 | 0 | 16 | 2 | +14 | 7 | Semi-finals |
| 2 | Ethiopia | 3 | 2 | 1 | 0 | 11 | 2 | +9 | 7 | Semi-finals |
| 3 | South Sudan | 3 | 1 | 0 | 2 | 1 | 6 | −5 | 3 | |
| 4 | Zanzibar | 3 | 0 | 0 | 3 | 0 | 18 | −18 | 0 | |

Source: Soccerway
2 June 2022
13:00

| Zanzibar | 0–5 | Ethiopia |
|---|---|---|
| | Report | Tadesse 2'; Abera 27', 55'; Zeleke 73', 84' |

FUFA Technical Centre, Njeru
2 June 2022
16:00

| Tanzania | 2–0 | South Sudan |
|---|---|---|
| Bilali 38'; Msewa 90+3' | Report |

FUFA Technical Centre, Njeru
Referee: Aline Umuton (Rwanda)

4 June 2022
13:00

| Ethiopia | 2–2 | Tanzania |
|---|---|---|
| Abera 9'; Temesgen 64' | Report | Clement 23'; Kasonga 78' |

FUFA Technical Centre, Njeru
Referee: Suavis Iratunga (Burundi)
4 June 2022
16:00

| South Sudan | 1–0 | Zanzibar |
|---|---|---|
| Stephen 80' | Report |

FUFA Technical Centre, Njeru
Referee: Shamirah Nabadda (Uganda)

6 June 2022
16:00

| South Sudan | 0–4 | Ethiopia |
|---|---|---|
| | Report | Kalsa 26', 65', 87'; Abera 27' (pen.) |

Bugembe Stadium, Jinja
6 June 2022
16:00

| Tanzania | 12–0 | Zanzibar |
|---|---|---|
| Clement 1', 32', 59', 85'; Pangamwene 21'; Msewa 22'; Kasonga 29'; Omary 48', 61', 81'; Mbunda 50'; Mabanza 60' | Report |

FUFA Technical Centre, Njeru

== Knockout stage ==
Semi-finals
9 June – FUFA Technical Centre
Uganda (a.e.t.) | 1
Ethiopia | 0
9 June – FUFA Technical Centre
Tanzania | 1
Burundi | 2

Final
11 June – FUFA Technical Centre
Uganda | 3
Burundi | 1
Third place
11 June –
Ethiopia | 2
Tanzania | 1

=== Semi-finals ===
9 June 2022
12:00

| Uganda | 1–0 (a.e.t.) | Ethiopia |
|---|---|---|
| Ikwaput 116' | Report |

FUFA Technical Centre, Njeru
9 June 2022
15:30

| Tanzania | 1–2 | Burundi |
|---|---|---|
| Clement 1' | Report | Yona 13' (o.g.); Niyonkuru 78' (pen.) |

FUFA Technical Centre, Njeru

=== Third place ===
11 June 2022
12:00

| Ethiopia | 2–1 | Tanzania |
|---|---|---|
| Taddese 9'; Lema 27' | Report | Clement 80' |

FUFA Technical Tentre, Njeru
Referee: Diana Murungi (Uganda)

=== Final ===
11 June 2022
15:00

| Uganda | 3–1 | Burundi |
|---|---|---|
| Nabweteme 2', 90+1'; Ikwaput 44' | Report | Bukuru 49' |

FUFA Technical Centre, Njeru
Referee: Aline Umuton (Rwanda)

== Goalscorers ==
There have been 59 goals scored in 16 matches, for an average of 3.69 goals per match (as of 11 June 2022).

7 goals

- (Tanzania) Opah Clement

6 goals

- (Uganda) Fazila Ikwaput

5 goals

- (Burundi) Sandrine Niyonkuru
- (Uganda) Sandra Nabweteme

4 goals

- (Ethiopia) Loza Abera
- (Ethiopia) Aregash Tadesse

3 goals

- (Tanzania) Mwanahamis Omary

2 goals

- (Burundi) Rachelle Bukuru
- (Ethiopia) Kidist Zeleke
- (Tanzania) Enekia Kasonga
- (Tanzania) Diana Msewa

1 goal

- (Burundi) Falonne Nahimana
- (Ethiopia) Turist Lema
- (Ethiopia) Bizuayehu Aymeku Taddese
- (Ethiopia) Mesay Temesgen
- (Rwanda) Anne Marie Ibangarye
- (Rwanda) Zawadi Usanase
- (Rwanda) Lydia Uzayisenga
- (South Sudan) Debora Stephen
- (Tanzania) Amina Ally Bilali
- (Tanzania) Ester Mabanza
- (Tanzania) Protasia Mbunda
- (Tanzania) Janeth Pangamwene
- (Uganda) Phionah Nabbumba
- (Uganda) Shamirah Nalugya
- (Uganda) Margaret Namirimu
- (Uganda) Aisha Nantongo

1 own goal

- (Tanzania) Gelwa Yona (against Burundi)

== Awards ==
The following awards were given at the conclusion of the tournament.

| Player of the tournament | Best goalkeeper | Top scorer |
|---|---|---|
| (Uganda) Fazila Ikwaput | (Uganda) Daisy Nakaziro | (Tanzania) Opah Clement |
FIFA Fair Play Award
Tanzania

== Final standings ==
| Pos | Team | Pld | W | D | L | GF | GA | GD | Pts | Final result |
|---|---|---|---|---|---|---|---|---|---|---|
| 1 | Uganda (H) | 5 | 5 | 0 | 0 | 15 | 2 | +13 | 15 | Champions |
| 2 | Burundi | 5 | 3 | 0 | 2 | 9 | 9 | 0 | 9 | Runners-up |
| 3 | Ethiopia | 5 | 3 | 1 | 1 | 13 | 4 | +9 | 10 | Third place |
| 4 | Tanzania | 5 | 2 | 1 | 2 | 18 | 6 | +12 | 7 | Fourth place |
| 5 | Rwanda | 3 | 1 | 0 | 2 | 3 | 4 | −1 | 3 | Eliminated in group stage |
| 6 | South Sudan | 3 | 1 | 0 | 2 | 1 | 6 | −5 | 3 | Eliminated in group stage |
| 7 | Djibouti | 3 | 0 | 0 | 3 | 0 | 10 | −10 | 0 | Eliminated in group stage |
| 8 | Zanzibar | 3 | 0 | 0 | 3 | 0 | 18 | −18 | 0 | Eliminated in group stage |

(H) Hosts
