= 2010 African Women's Championship qualification =

Tournament details
- Dates: -
- Teams: 24 (from 1 confederation)

Tournament statistics
- Matches played: -
- Top scorer: -

This page provides the summaries of the matches of the qualifying rounds for the group stage of the 2010 African Women's Championship. These matches also served as part of the qualifiers for the 2011 FIFA Women's World Cup to be held in Germany.

A total of 23 national teams entered the qualification, which was held over two rounds. In the preliminary round, the 18 lowest-ranked nations were drawn in pairs. The nine winners then joined five other national teams in the first round, where the seven winners qualified for the finals.

== Preliminary round ==
The matches in the preliminary round were held on 6–7 March 2010 (first leg) and 19–21 March 2010 (second leg).

=== Summary ===
Team 1	Agg.	Team 2	1st leg	2nd leg
Egypt	w/o	Algeria		
Namibia	3–2	Angola	2–1	1–1
Botswana	2–7	DR Congo	0–2	2–5
Senegal	1–0	Morocco	0–0	1–0
Gabon	2–5	Ivory Coast	1–2	1–3
Guinea	4–3	Sierra Leone	3–2	1–1
Togo	w/o	Mali		
Ethiopia	2–4	Tanzania	1–3	1–1
Kenya	w/o	Eritrea		

=== Matches ===
Algeria	w/o	Egypt

Algeria advanced to the first round after Egypt withdrew.

7 March 2010
16:00 UTC+3

Namibia	2–1	Angola
Adams 73'; Fredericks 85'	Report	Gonçalves 37'

Sam Nujoma Stadium, Windhoek
Referee: Diedre Mitchell (South Africa)
21 March 2010
16:00 UTC+1

Angola	1–1	Namibia
Gonçalves 51'	Report	Kleihtjia 87'

Ombaka National Stadium, Benguela
Referee: Pamela Chiwaya (Zimbabwe)

Namibia won 3 – 2 on aggregate and advanced to the first round.

7 March 2010

Botswana	0–2	DR Congo
	Report	Malembo 11'; Dianteso 17'

University of Botswana Stadium, Gaborone
Referee: Gladys Lengwe (Zambia)
19 March 2010
15:30 UTC+2

DR Congo	5–2	Botswana
Malembo 20', 27'; Nzuzi 24', 28'; Mafutu 88'	Report	Ramasi 21', 55'

Stade des Martyrs, Kinshasa
Referee: Thérèse Sylvie Abou'ou (Cameroon)

Congo DR won 7 – 2 on aggregate and advanced to the first round.

6 March 2010
17:00 UTC±0

Senegal	0–0	Morocco

Stade Alassane Djigo, Pikine
Referee: Therese Sagno (Guinea)
20 March 2010
15:30 UTC±0

Morocco	0–1	Senegal
	Report	Ndiaye 10'

Stade Boubker Ammar, Salé
Referee: Lilia Abdeljaoued (Tunisia)

Senegal won 1 – 0 on aggregate and advanced to the first round.

7 March 2010

Gabon	1–2	Ivory Coast
Glwadis 27'	Report	Bancouly 7'; Diakité 90+1'

Stade Augustin Monédan de Sibang, Libreville
Referee: Felicia Chibuogu Okwugba (Nigeria)
19 March 2010
15:30 UTC±0

Ivory Coast	3–1	Gabon
Bancouly 3', 31', 46'	Report	Mapangou 8'

Stade Robert Champroux, Abidjan
Referee: Kankou Coulibaly (Mali)

Ivory Coast won 5 – 2 on aggregate and advanced to the first round.

7 March 2010

Guinea	3–2	Sierra Leone
(1H)		Moriba (2H) (2H)

Stade du 28 Septembre, Conakry
Referee: Aisatta Ameyo Amegee (Togo)
20 March 2010
19:00 UTC±0

Sierra Leone	1–1	Guinea

National Stadium, Freetown
Referee: Vivian Aggor (Ghana)

Guinea won 4 – 3 on aggregate and advanced to the first round.

Mali	w/o	Togo

Mali advanced to the first round after Togo withdrew.

6 March 2010
16:00 UTC+3

Ethiopia	1–3	Tanzania
Yassin 67' (pen.)	Report	Chabruma 23'; Shurua 53'; Rashid 88'

Addis Ababa Stadium, Addis Ababa
Referee: Damaris Kimani (Kenya)
20 March 2010
16:00 UTC+3

Tanzania	1–1	Ethiopia
Rashid 77'	Report	Ware 73'

Uhuru Stadium, Dar es Salaam
Referee: Martha Nyekanyeka (Malawi)

Tanzania won 4 – 2 on aggregate and advanced to the first round.

Eritrea	w/o	Kenya

Eritrea advanced to the first round after Kenya withdrew.

== First round ==
The first round was scheduled to be held on 21–23 May 2010 (first leg) and 4–6 June 2010 (second leg).

=== Summary ===
Team 1	Agg.	Team 2	1st leg	2nd leg
Algeria	2–1	Tunisia	1–1	1–0
Namibia	w/o	Equatorial Guinea	1–5	n/p
DR Congo	0–5	Cameroon	0–2	0–3
Senegal	0–4	Ghana	0–1	0–3
Ivory Coast	2–5	Nigeria	1–2	1–3
Guinea	2–3	Mali	0–2	2–1
Tanzania	11–4	Eritrea	8–1	3–3

=== Matches ===
22 May 2010
17:00 UTC+2

Algeria	1–1	Tunisia
Bouhani 90+5'	Report	Chebbi 73' (pen.)

Stade de Koléa, Koléa
Referee: Incaf El Harkaoui (Morocco)
5 June 2010
17:00 UTC+2

Tunisia	0–1	Algeria
	Report	Wadah 65'

Stade El Menzah, Tunis
Referee: Therese Sagno (Guinea)

Algeria won 2 – 1 on aggregate and advanced to the final tournament.

23 May 2010
16:00 UTC+1

Namibia	1–5	Equatorial Guinea
Skrywer 3'	Report	Carol 19', 36'; Añonma 25'; Simporé 42'; Chinasa 45+1'

Sam Nujoma Stadium, Windhoek
Referee: Gladys Lengwe (Zambia)

Equatorial Guinea	n/p (Note: Namibian were unable to obtain transport to Equatorial Guinea after their initial flight was cancelled; the match was scratched.)	Namibia

Equatorial Guinea advanced to the final tournament after Namibia were forced to withdraw prior to the second leg.

21 May 2010
15:30 UTC+1

DR Congo	0–2	Cameroon
	Report	Mani 4'; Mbella 35'

Stade des Martyrs, Kinshasa
Referee: Diedre Mitchell (South Africa)
5 June 2010
15:30 UTC+1

Cameroon	3–0	DR Congo
Mani 23'; Enganamouit 45'; Onguene 86'	Report

Stade Ahmadou Ahidjo, Yaoundé
Referee: Agathe Athacou (Ivory Coast)

Cameroon won 5 – 0 on aggregate and advanced to the final tournament.

22 May 2010
17:00 UTC±0

Senegal	0–1	Ghana
	Report	Ankomah 43'

Stade Demba Diop, Dakar
Referee: Slidja Moula (Algeria)
6 June 2010

Ghana	3–0	Senegal
Boakye 23'; Ankomah 34'; Okoe 65'

Ohene Djan Stadium, Accra
Referee: Kankou Coulibaly (Mali)

Ghana won 4 – 0 on aggregate and advanced to the final tournament.

23 May 2010
15:30 UTC±0

Ivory Coast	1–2	Nigeria
N'Guessan 78'	Report	Nkwocha 21'; Ohadugha 45+1'

Stade Robert Champroux, Abidjan
Referee: Aisatta Ameyo Amegee (Togo)
5 June 2010
16:00 UTC+1

Nigeria	3–1	Ivory Coast
Chikwelu 13'; Nkwocha 72', 89'		Diakité 50'

Abuja National Stadium, Abuja
Referee: Patricia Obone Obiang (Gabon)

Nigeria won 5 – 2 on aggregate and advanced to the final tournament.

23 May 2010
15:00 UTC±0

Guinea	0–2	Mali
	Report	Sako 43' (o.g.); Touré 90'

Stade du 28 Septembre, Conakry
Referee: Mercy Tagoe-Quarcoo (Ghana)
5 June 2010

Mali	1–2	Guinea

Bamako
Referee: Felicia Chibuogu Okwugba (Nigeria)

Mali won 3 – 2 on aggregate and advanced to the final tournament.

23 May 2010
16:00 UTC+3

Tanzania	8–1	Eritrea
Shurua 6', 27', 64', 80'; Mwasikili 19'; Rashidi 21', 60', 74'	Report	Ghebresa 90'

Uhuru Stadium, Dar es Salaam
Referee: Nabikko Ssemmambo (Uganda)
5 June 2010

Eritrea	3–3	Tanzania
Mehari 1'; Zerihani 48', 52'		Rashidi 76', 78', 88'

Cicero Stadium, Asmara
Referee: Damaris Kimani (Kenya)

Tanzania won 11 – 4 on aggregate and advanced to the final tournament.
