= Diana Msewa =

Tanzanian footballer (born 2001)

Diana Mswa
Personal information
- Full name: Diana Lucas Msewa
- Date of birth: 13 November 2001 (age 25)
- Place of birth: Mbeya, Tanzania
- Position: Midfielder

Team information
- Current team: Trabzonspor
- Number: 80

Youth career
- 2010: Ruvuma Queens

Senior career*
Years	Team	Apps	(Gls)
2016	Ruvuma Queens	60	(48)
2021–2023	AUSF Assa-Zag	43	(25)
2023–2024	Amed	25	(8)
2024–	Trabzonspor	27	(9)

International career
2018-	Tanzania	30	(25)
- * Club domestic league appearances and goals as of 11 October 2025

Diana Lucas Msewa (born 13 November 2001) is a Tanzanian professional women's football forward who plays in the Turkish Super League for Trabzonspor and the Tanzania women's national team.

== Club career ==
In September 2023, Msewa moved to Turkey, and signed with the Diyarbakır-based club Amed to play in the Super League. She scored eight goals in 25 matches. The next season, she transferred to Trabzon.

== International career ==
In 2019, Msewa earned a call up to the Tanzania women's under-20 team for the inaugural 2019 COSAFA U-20 Women's Championship. At the end of the competition they emerged champions after defeating Zambia by 2–1 in the final. During the 2020 African U-20 Women's World Cup Qualifying Tournament, Msewa scored both first goals in the first and second legs of the preliminary round qualifiers against Uganda leading to the 4–2 victory on aggregate to advance to the first round.

In 2019, she was promoted to the senior team and made the squad for the 2019 CECAFA Women's Championship. She later named in the 2021 COSAFA Women's Championship squad list. She played four matches during the competition as Tanzania emerged champions for the first time in history.

== International goals ==
No.	Date	Venue	Opponent	Score	Result	Competition
1.	2 June 2022	FUFA Technical Centre, Njeru, Uganda	South Sudan	2–0	2–0	2022 CECAFA Women's Championship
2.	7 September 2022	Madibaz Stadium, Port Elizabeth, South Africa	Malawi	2–0	3–1	2022 COSAFA Women's Championship
3.	20 February 2025	Azam Complex Stadium, Dar es Salaam, Tanzania	Equatorial Guinea	3–1	3–1	2026 Women's Africa Cup of Nations qualification
4.	28 October 2025	Abebe Bikila Stadium, Addis Ababa, Ethiopia	Ethiopia	1–0	1–0	2026 Women's Africa Cup of Nations qualification
5.	13 June 2025	Azam Complex Stadium, Dar es Salaam, Tanzania	South Sudan	1–0	4–0	2025 CECAFA Women's Championship
6.	17 June 2025	Azam Complex Stadium, Dar es Salaam, Tanzania	Burundi	5–0	6–0	2025 CECAFA Women's Championship
7.	27 July 2026	Moulay Rachid Stadium, Casablanca, Morocco	South Africa	1–0	2–1	2026 Women's Africa Cup of Nations
8.	4 August 2026	Larbi Zaouli Stadium, Casablanca. Morocco	Ivory Coast	1–2	1–2	2026 Women's Africa Cup of Nations

== Honours ==
- COSAFA U-20 Women's Championship: 2019
- COSAFA Women's Championship: 2021
