= Julitha Singano =

Tanzanian footballer (born 2001)

Personal information
- Full name: Julitha Aminiel Tamuwai Singano
- Date of birth: 8 February 2001 (age 25)
- Place of birth: Kilimanjaro Region, Tanzania
- Height: 1.69 m (5 ft 7 in)
- Position: Defender

Team information
- Current team: Al-Nassr
- Number: 19

Senior career*
Years	Team	Apps	(Gls)
2019–2022	Simba Queens		
2022–2026	Juárez	119	(3)
2026–	Al Nassr	3	(0)

International career
2019–	Tanzania		(3)
- * Club domestic league appearances and goals

Julitha Aminiel Tamuwai Singano (born 8 February 2001), shortly known as Julitha Singano (Note: Also written as Julietha or Julieth Singano; in Arabic: جوليثا سينغانو), is a Tanzanian professional footballer who plays as defender for Saudi Women's Premier League (SWPL) club Al Nassr and the Tanzania national team.

== Club career ==
In Tanzania, Singano played for Simba Queens.

In July 2022, Singano joined Liga MX Femenil side Juárez, becoming the club's first player born outside Mexico to represent the team. She made her league debut on 1 August 2022 against Monterrey and quickly established herself as one of the club's leading foreign players, becoming a regular starter.

By March 2026, she had made 103 appearances for the club, becoming one of the most-capped players in its history.

On 13 June 2026, the club announced Singano's departure after four seasons with the club, following the conclusion of her contract. During her time with the Bravas, she made 119 appearances and scored three goals across eight tournaments.

Prior to the 2026 Women's Africa Cup of Nations, Singano joined Al Nassr on a two-year contract. She made her debut for the club as a substitute in the final of the 2026 WAFF Women's Clubs Championship, before making her first start in the AFC Women's Champions League on 17 August 2026.

== International career ==
Singano has represented Tanzania at senior level since 2019, when she was selected for the 2019 CECAFA Women's Championship. During the tournament, she scored her first international goal in a 9–0 win over South Sudan.

=== International goals ===
Scores and results list Tanzania's goal tally first, score column indicates score after each Singano goal.

No.	Date	Venue	Opponent	Score	Result	Competition	Ref.
1	16 November 2019	Azam Complex Stadium, Dar es Salaam, Tanzania	South Sudan	7–0	9–0	2019 CECAFA Championship	
2	18 February 2020	Le Kram Stadium, Le Kram, Tunisia	Morocco	2–3	2–3	2020 UNAF Tournament	
3	3 June 2025	Azam Complex Stadium, Dar es Salaam, Tanzania	DR Congo	2–0	3–1	Friendly	
