= Fazila Ikwaput =

Ugandan footballer (born 2000)

Personal information
- Date of birth: 15 September 1995 (age 31)
- Place of birth: Uganda
- Position: Forward

Team information
- Current team: East Bengal
- Number: 10

Youth career
- 2016–2018: Olila High School Ladies

Senior career*
Years	Team	Apps	(Gls)
2018	Gokulam Kerala	6	(5)
2018	BIIK-Kazygurt	5	(6)
2019–2022	Lady Doves	45	(34)
2022–2023	Omonia Women	18	(16)
2024–2025	Gokulam Kerala	22	(37)
2025–	East Bengal	13	(21)

International career
2016–	Uganda		(14)
- * Club domestic league appearances and goals

Fazila Ikwaput (born 15 September 1995) is a Ugandan professional footballer who plays for Indian Women's League club East Bengal and the Uganda women's national football team.

== Club career ==
Ikwaput played for Gokulam Kerala FC (women) in the 2017–18 Indian Women's League (IWL) season, scoring five goals for her team. In the same year, she became the first Ugandan female footballer to play in the UEFA Champions League group stage with Kazakh club BIIK Kazygurt. She later played for Omonia Women FC in Cyprus.

In January 2024, Ikwaput rejoined Gokulam Kerala ahead of the 2023–24 season of the IWL. She finished the season as the top-scorer in the league, with 13 goals in nine matches, winning the golden boot. She scored two goals on her debut against Sports Odisha in a 8–0 win. She then scored a hat-trick against East Bengal in a 4–0 win before netting four goals against Sports Odisha. Ikwaput was awarded the Best Striker for the reason.

== International goals ==
Scores and results list Uganda goal tally first

No.	Date	Venue	Opponent	Score	Result	Competition
1	15 September 2016	Jinja, Uganda	Burundi	1–0	1–0	2016 CECAFA Women's Championship
2	17 November 2019	Chamazi Stadium, Mbagala, Tanzania	Djibouti	6–0	13–0	2019 CECAFA Women's Championship
3	17 November 2019	Chamazi Stadium, Mbagala, Tanzania	Djibouti	8–0	13–0	2019 CECAFA Women's Championship
4	17 November 2019	Chamazi Stadium, Mbagala, Tanzania	Djibouti	9–0	13–0	2019 CECAFA Women's Championship
5	1 June 2022	FUFA Technical Centre, Njeru, Uganda	Rwanda	1–0	2–0	2022 CECAFA Women's Championship
6	1 June 2022	FUFA Technical Centre, Njeru, Uganda	Rwanda	2–0	2–0	2022 CECAFA Women's Championship
7	3 June 2022	FUFA Technical Centre, Njeru, Uganda	Djibouti	5–0	5–0	2022 CECAFA Women's Championship
8	5 June 2022	FUFA Technical Centre, Njeru, Uganda	Burundi	1–1	4–1	2022 CECAFA Women's Championship
9	9 June 2022	FUFA Technical Centre, Njeru, Uganda	Ethiopia	1–0	1–0 (a.e.t.)	2022 CECAFA Women's Championship
10	11 June 2022	FUFA Technical Centre, Njeru, Uganda	Burundi	2–0	3–1	2022 CECAFA Women's Championship
11	12 July 2023	Kigali Pelé Stadium, Kigali, Rwanda	Rwanda	3–3	3–3	2024 CAF Women's Olympic qualifying tournament
12	16 July 2023	Kigali Pelé Stadium, Kigali, Rwanda	Rwanda	1–0	1–0	2024 CAF Women's Olympic qualifying tournament
13	26 October 2023	FUFA Technical Centre, Njeru, Uganda	Cameroon	2–0	2–0	2024 CAF Women's Olympic qualifying tournament
14	21 February 2025	Hamz Stadium, Kampala, Uganda	Ethiopia	2–0	2–0	2026 Women's Africa Cup of Nations qualification

== Honours ==
East Bengal

- SAFF Women's Club Championship: 2025
- Indian Women's League: 2024–25, 2025–26

Individual

- Indian Women's League Top Scorer: 2023–24
- Indian Women's League Best Striker: 2023–24:
- Uganda Women’s Most Valuable Footballer: 2017
