= Fauzia Najjemba =

Ugandan footballer (born 2003)

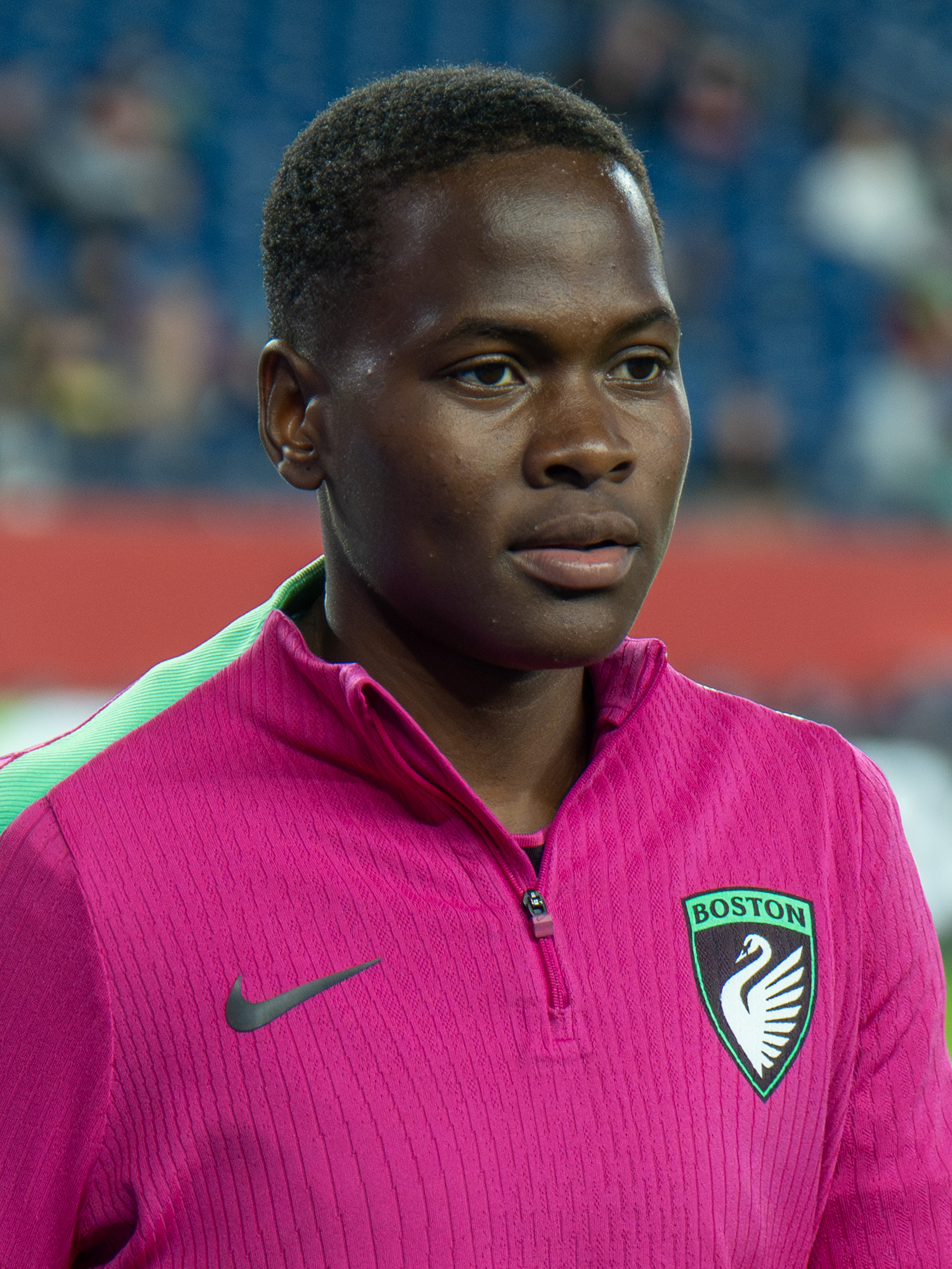
- Najjemba with the Boston Legacy in 2026

Personal information
- Date of birth: 7 October 2003 (age 23)
- Place of birth: Nagalama, Uganda
- Height: 1.65 m (5 ft 5 in)
- Position: Striker

Team information
- Current team: Boston Legacy
- Number: 13

Senior career*
Years	Team	Apps	(Gls)
–2022	Kampala Queens		
2022	BIIK Shymkent		
2023–2025	Dynamo Moscow	32	(9)
2026–	Boston Legacy	5	(0)

International career^{‡}
2021–	Uganda	2	(1)
- * Club domestic league appearances and goals as of 02:15, 8 November 2026 (UTC) ‡ National team caps and goals as of 26 October 2021.

Fauzia Najjemba (born 7 October 2003) is a Ugandan professional footballer who plays as a striker for Boston Legacy FC of the National Women's Soccer League (NWSL) and the Uganda national team.

== Early life ==
Najjemba was born to Zubair Kivumbi and Hawa Namulono and raised in Nakifuma, Uganda. She belongs to the Baganda tribe in Uganda. She attended St. Joseph P/ S (Primary School) Naggalama where she sat for her PLE (Primary Leaving Exam) in 2014. She joined Nakifuma High and later Mukono High School where she finished her O level in 2018.

== Club career ==
Najjemba has played for Kampala Queens FC in Uganda.

She also played for Isra Soccer Academy.

On 8 January 2026, National Women's Soccer League (NWSL) expansion club Boston Legacy FC announced the signing of Najjemba on a two-year contract with a mutual option for another year.

== International career ==
Najjemba capped for Uganda at senior level during the 2022 Africa Women Cup of Nations qualification.

=== International goals ===
Scores and results list Uganda goal tally first

No.	Date	Venue	Opponent	Score	Result	Competition
1	17 November 2019	Chamazi Stadium, Mbagala, Tanzania	Djibouti	10–0	13–0	2019 CECAFA Women's Championship
2	19 November 2019	Chamazi Stadium, Mbagala, Tanzania	Ethiopia	1–0	1–0	2019 CECAFA Women's Championship
3	20 October 2021	St. Mary's Stadium-Kitende, Kampala, Uganda	Ethiopia	2–0	2–0	2022 Africa Women Cup of Nations qualification
4	1 December 2023	Père Jégo Stadium, Casablanca, Morocco	Morocco	1–0	1–1	Friendly

== Awards and recognition ==
Najjemba won the most valuable player award at the 2019 CECAFA Under 17 Championship in Njeru.

== See also ==
- Uganda women's national football team
- Kampala Queens FC
- CECAFA Women's Championship
- 2022 Africa Women Cup of Nations qualification
- Football in Uganda
