= Samy Smaili =

French football manager

Personal information
- Date of birth: 24 November 1965 (age 60)
- Place of birth: France

Managerial career
- Years: Team
- 1993–1999: Reims Sainte-Anne
- 2000–2005: Taissy
- 2005–2007: Saint-Quentin
- 2007–2009: Sedan B
- 2009: Reims Sainte-Anne
- 2011–2012: Villeneuve-Saint-Germain
- 2012–2014: Charleville-Mézières
- 2015–2016: Prix-lès-Mézières
- 2016–2017: Racing (Luxembourg)
- 2017–2020: Luxembourg (women)
- 2020–2021: Djibouti (women)

Samy Smaili (born 24 November 1965) is a French football manager who last managed the Djibouti women's national football team.

== Career ==
In 2000, Smaili was appointed manager of French seventh tier side Taissy, helping them earn promotion to the French fifth tier within 4 seasons. In 2005, he was appointed manager of Saint-Quentin in the French fifth tier, helping them earn promotion to the French fourth tier. In 2009, he was appointed manager of French sixth tier club Reims Sainte-Anne. In 2012, Smaili was appointed manager of Charleville-Mézières in the French seventh tier, helping them earn promotion to the French sixth tier.

Before the second half of 2014–15, he was appointed manager of French sixth tier club Prix-lès-Mézières. In 2016, he was appointed manager of Racing (Luxembourg) in Luxembourg. In 2017, Smaili was appointed manager of the Luxembourg women's national football team. In 2020, he was appointed manager of the Djibouti women's national football team.
