= Amy Lasu =

South Sudanese footballer

Personal information
- Full name: Amy Lasu Luaya Lasu
- Date of birth: 8 November 1995 (age 30)
- Position: Defender

Team information
- Current team: OFI Crete W.F.C.

Senior career*
Years	Team	Apps	(Gls)
2015–2016	Gaspo		
2016–2019	Makolanders		
2019–2021	Juba Super Sports	14	(11)
2021–2022	Determine Girls		
2023–2024	Saned	31	(1)
2024–2025	Transinvest	21	(1)
2026	Panetolikos	8	(0)
2026–	OFI		

International career^{‡}
2021–	South Sudan	8	(3)
- * Club domestic league appearances and goals ‡ National team caps and goals as of 4 October 2021.

Amy Lasu Luaya Lasu (born 8 November 1995) is a South Sudanese footballer who plays as a defender for Greek club OFI Crete and the South Sudan women's national team.

== Early life ==
Lasu moved to Kenya in 1998, aged three.

== International career ==
Lasu capped for South Sudan at senior level during the 2021 COSAFA Women's Championship.

== Personal life ==
In 2018, Lasu earned a bachelor's degree in human resource management from Moi University.
