= Deborah Luka =

South Sudanese footballer (born 2003)

Personal information
- Full name: Alworonga Debora Stephen Luka
- Date of birth: Disputed; 30 January 2003 (age 23); 1 March 2004 (age 22)
- Place of birth: Nebbi, Uganda
- Positions: Midfielder; forward

Team information
- Current team: Uganda Martyrs Lubaga
- Number: 10

Senior career*
Years	Team	Apps	(Gls)
2016–2019	Paidha FC		
2019–2022	Yei Joint Stars	56	(67)
2023–2024	FK Saned	32	(14)
2024	MFA Žalgiris-MRU	7	(3)
2024–2026	FK Apolonia		
2026	Uganda Martyrs Lubaga	3	(0)

International career
2022–	South Sudan	9	(6)
- * Club domestic league appearances and goals

Alworonga Debora Stephen Luka (born 30 January 2003), commonly known as Deborah Luka, is a professional footballer who plays as a forward for FUFA Women Super League club Uganda Martyrs Lubaga. Born in Uganda, she plays for the South Sudan national team.

== Career ==
Deborah is currently playing as a striker for FK Apolonia, which is in the Kategoria Superiore Femra division, which is the first-tier division of Albania.

She plays for the South Sudan women's national football team and has scored in nearly every match she has played for the nation.
