= Winie Mapangou =

Gabonese footballer

Personal information
- Full name: Winnie Delma Mapangou
- Date of birth: 27 August 1993 (age 33)
- Place of birth: Libreville, Gabon
- Height: 1.60 m (5 ft 3 in)
- Position: Forward

Team information
- Current team: Brest
- Number: 7

Senior career*
| Years | Team | Apps | (Gls) |
| 2013 | Claix | 11 | (1) |
| 2016–2017 | Grenoble | 16 | (7) |
| 2019– | Brest | 12 | (2) |

International career
- Gabon
- * Club domestic league appearances and goals as of 5 September 2020

Winnie Delma Mapangou (born 27 August 1993), known as Winie Mapangou, is a Gabonese footballer who plays as a forward for French Division 2 Féminine club Stade Brestois 29 and captains the Gabon women's national team.

== International career ==
Mapangou capped for Gabon at senior level during the 2010 African Women's Championship qualification (preliminary round).

=== International goals ===
Scores and results list Gabon's goal tally first

| No. | Date | Venue | Opponent | Score | Result | Competition |
|---|---|---|---|---|---|---|
| 1 | 19 March 2010 | Stade Robert Champroux, Abidjan, Ivory Coast | Ivory Coast | 1–1 | 1–3 | 2010 African Women's Championship qualification |
| 2 | 23 May 2015 | Stade Augustin Monédan de Sibang, Libreville, Gabon | South Africa | 1–0 | 2–3 | 2015 CAF Women's Olympic Qualifying Tournament |
