= Nyanza Textile Industries Limited =

Textile manufacturing company in Uganda

Coordinates: 00°26′10″N 33°11′10″E

- Company type: Private
- Industry: Textile industry
- Founded: 1954
- Headquarters: Njeru, Uganda
- Products: Cloth, bedsheets, T-shirts, uniforms
- Number of employees: 1500 (2016)
- Website: Homepage

Nyanza Textile Industries Limited (Nytil), is an integrated textile manufacturing company in Uganda.

== Location ==
The headquarters of the company and the company's factory are located in the town of Njeru, in Buikwe District, along the western bank of the Victoria Nile, between the Source of the Nile and Nalubaale Hydroelectric Power Station. This is approximately 6 kilometres (4 mi), by road, west of the central business district of Jinja, the nearest large town. Nytil lies approximately 77 kilometres (48 mi), by road, east of Kampala, the capital and largest city in that country. The coordinates of the main office and factory are:0°26'10.0"N, 33°11'10.0"E (Latitude:0.436116; Longitude:33.186104).

The company also operates a second factory located on Kampala Road, in Kampala's central business district.

== History ==
Nyanza Textitle Industries was established in 1954, by the colonial government as a parastatal company. The company was initially managed by Calico Printers Association (CPA), a Manchester, England based Company. CPA provided equipment and technical and managerial support until 1972 after which the independent governments in Uganda ran the factory until 1996, when they sold it to Southern Range Nyanza Limited, the company that runs it today.

== Overview ==
Nytil is the largest integrated textile industry, Uganda. It has facilities for spinning, weaving, coloring, and tailoring. Spinning capacity is 8,000 kilograms (18,000 lb) per 24 hours. Also in 24 hours, the factory can weave 100,000 metres (110,000 yd) and tailor 18,000 T-shirts. The plant produces 150,000 bales of fabric annually, of which 15,000 are sold inside Uganda and the rest is exported. In 2018, total revenue is planned at US$50m (Shs167 billion), compared to $40m (about Shs133 billion) in 2015.

== Operations ==
The plant employs 1,500 in three shifts. This compares with 6,800 employees in 1996, whose output was less than that of the present workforce. The factory buys cotton from farmers from the districts of Kasese, Arua, Hoima and Masindi. The factory has a dedicated high voltage power line that supplies up to 3 MW (4,000 hp) of electric power. The cotton used by this company is either imported from Tanzania or sourced from Kasese District in the Western Region of Uganda.

== See also ==
- Economy of Uganda
- List of power stations in Uganda
