= Shamirah Nabadda =

Ugandan association football referee (born 1995)

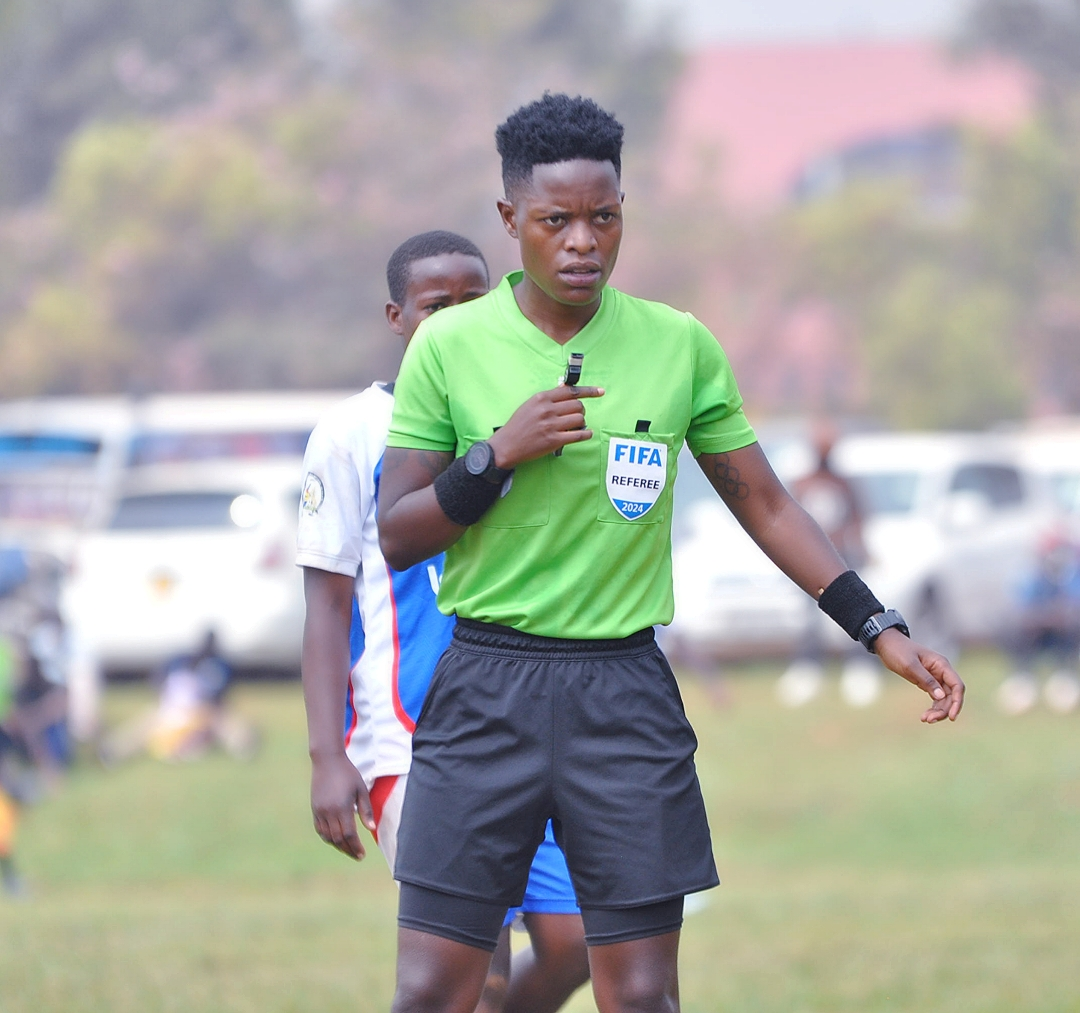
- Born: 23 September 1995 (age 31); Mbarara, Uganda

International
Years	League	Role
2018–present	FIFA listed	Referee
2018–present	CAF	Referee

Shamirah Nabadda (born 26 September 1995) is a Ugandan association football referee.

== Early life and education ==
Nabadda was born and raised in Mbarara City, Uganda. She is the third born of Quraish Mutagubya and Mastula Birungi, a family blessed with six children.

Nabadda attended Masaka SS where she completed her Uganda Advanced Certificate of Education. She was part of the school football team and she played as a left back during her secondary school days.

She graduated from Bishop Stuart University with a Bachelor's dedgree in journalism.

Nabadda later joined Western United which played in the top-flight Women's League (FWEL). She attracted attention from Abbas Sendyowa who was a FUFA delegate for Mbarara and a close family friend. He recommended Nabadda to a short refereeing course at FUFA Technical Center in Njeru.

In 2018, she attended and attained her Fifa badge. Nabadda got her first international assignment for the African Women's Championship qualifier between South Africa and Lesotho.

== History ==
Nabadda was appointed as one of the referees who officiated at the Paris Olympics in 2024. The Paris Olympics had 21 referees, 42 assistant referees, 20 video officials and six support referees from 45 countries making a total of 89 appointed officials, ten officials came from Africa and she was the only one from to come from Uganda making her the first female from Uganda to officiate at the Olympic Games. She served as a support referee among other three female match officials selected from Africa.

In 2022, she was selected among the 40 match officials by CAF who officiated at the 2022 Africa Women Cup of Nations that took place in Morocco and she was also selected for the 2023 African Women's Champions League that took place in Cote d'Ivoire between 5 and 19 November.

== Refereeing ==
Nabadda attended a short refereeing course at the FUFA Technical Centre in Njeru and she started officiating at low-tier football tournaments.

Nabadda had gained acceptance by 2016, she was selected to officiate at the Uganda's most competitive school tournaments known as Copa Coca-Cola. She was later voted as the best referee from the national schools football championship for girls.

Nabadda attained the Fufa badge, Uganda's highest level for domestic referees and she was promoted to the second-tier of Ugandan football called the FUFA Big League. She was recognized as one of the top match officials and elevated to officiate at the Uganda Premier League.

Nabadda became the second Ugandan referee to officiate at the Olympics Games after Ali Tomusange (who officiated in Sydney, Australia, in 2000) and the very first female Ugandan referee to officiate at any Olympics.

Nabadda has been selected by FIFA as one of the match officials who will officiate at the FIFA U-17 Women's World Cup in the Dominican Republic from 6 October to 3 November 2024.

Nabadda was selected to be among the Ugandan officials to take charge of the African Nations Championship (CHAN) 2024 as a centre referee.
