= Falone Sumaili =

Burundian footballer

Personal information
- Date of birth: 16 June 2001 (age 25)
- Place of birth: DR Congo
- Position: Striker

Team information
- Current team: Huddersfield Town
- Number: 34

Senior career*
Years	Team	Apps	(Gls)
2018–2021	Bradford City		
2021–	Huddersfield Town		

International career^{‡}
- Burundi
- * Club domestic league appearances and goals as of 13:03, 5 November 2021 (UTC)` ‡ National team caps and goals as of 14:43, 22 August 2019 (UTC)

Falone Sumaili (born 16 June 2001) is a Burundian footballer who plays as a striker for English club Huddersfield Town and the Burundi women's national team.

== Early life ==
Sumaili was born in the Democratic Republic of the Congo in 2001, however, her family was forced to move to Burundi due to the Second Congo War, before later applying for refugee status in the United Kingdom. She first formally joined a women's football club at age sixteen after years of playing street football with the boys. Her uncle and her grandfather both played football, but her mother was skeptical.

== Club career ==
Sumaili began her career in Burundi with the club La Columbe. She played amateur football in both Uganda and Tanzania. She moved to England as a refugee and signed for Bradford City in 2018. She scored a hat-trick on the opening day of the 2019–20 season, and went on to score 13 goals in 33 appearances, making her the club's top scorer.

Sumaili moved to Huddersfield Town in summer 2021. In 2022, she scored 16 goals in 17 games for their Development Team. With the Development Team, she reached the semi-finals of the Sheffield and Hallamshire County Cup. She earned a call-up to the first team for the 2022 Cup final. She made 6 appearances for the first team during the 2022–23 season.

== International career ==
Sumaili plays for the Burundi women's national team. She participated in their second-place finish at the 2022 CECAFA Women's Championship. She also played in the 2022 Women's Africa Cup of Nations group stage, Burundi's first ever appearance in the tournament.
