= Opah Clement =

Tanzanian footballer (born 2001)

Personal information
- Full name: Opah Clement Tukumbuke Sanga
- Date of birth: 14 February 2001 (age 25)
- Place of birth: Iringa, Tanzania
- Height: 1.72 m (5 ft 8 in)
- Position: Forward

Senior career*
Years	Team	Apps	(Gls)
2019–2022	Simba Queens		
2022	→ Kayseri Kadın (loan)	10	(5)
2023–2024	Beşiktaş	11	(6)
2024	Henan Jianye		
2025	Juárez	5	(0)

International career^{‡}
2017–2019	Tanzania U20		
2019–	Tanzania	12	(4)
- * Club domestic league appearances and goals as of 1 November 2023 ‡ National team caps and goals as of 1 November 2023

Opah Clement Tukumbuke Sanga (born 14 February 2001) is a Tanzanian professional footballer who plays as a forward for Liga MX Femenil club Juárez and the Tanzania national team.

== Club career ==
Clement began her career with Simba Queens, playing in the Serengeti Lite Women's Premier League. She won the league in both 2019/20 and 2020/21. The latter victory qualified Simba Queens to play in the 2021 CAF Women's Champion's League CECAFA qualifiers. Simba Queens finished fourth. She scored a hat-trick in her team's 10-0 victory over FAD Club.

In the midst of the 2021/22 season, Clement went on loan to Kayseri Kadin FK in early 2022.

Simba Queens won the 2022 CAF Women's Champions League CECAFA qualifiers, with Clement scoring two goals over the course of the tournament. In the 2022 CAF Women's Champions League, Simba Queens finished fourth. Clement scored twice in the tournament and was named in CAF's best XI of the tournament.

Clement signed with Beşiktaş in 2023. Prior to signing with the team, she was the leading scorer in the Serengeti Lite Women's Premier League, having scored 9 goals.

== International career ==
Clement has capped for the Tanzania under-20 team. Clement made her competitive debut for the Tanzania national team during the 2020 COSAFA Women's Championship. The following year, Tanzania won the 2021 COSAFA Women's Championship.

In 2022, she finished third with Tanzania in the 2022 COSAFA Women's Championship and fourth in the 2022 CEFCAFA Women's Championship. Clement was the top scorer at the latter tournament.

== Honours ==
Simba Queens

- Serengeti Lite Women's Premier League: 2019-20, 2020/21

Tanzania

- COSAFA Women's Championship: 2021

Individual

- CAF Women's Champion's League Best XI: 2022
- CECAFA Women's Championship, Top Scorer: 2022
