= Eritrea women's national football team =

Women's association football team

Eritrea
- Association: Eritrean National Football Federation
- Confederation: CAF (Africa)
- Sub-confederation: CECAFA (East & Central Africa)
- Head coach: Ghezai Tesfagabir
- Top scorer: Selamahawit Almin Zerihani (2)
- Home stadium: Cicero Stadium
- FIFA code: ERI
First colours	Second colours

FIFA ranking
- Current: NR (16 June 2026)
- Highest: 29 (March 2007)
- Lowest: 58 (June – December 2007)

First international
- Eritrea 2–3 Tanzania (Asmara, Eritrea; 10 August 2002)

Biggest win
- Eritrea 3–2 Morocco (Asmara; 10 March 2007)

Biggest defeat
- Tanzania 8–1 Eritrea (Dar es Salaam, Tanzania; 23 May 2010)

The Eritrea women's national football team (Tigrinya: ኤርትራ ሃገራዊት ጋንታ ኩዕሶ እግሪ ደቂ ኣንስትዮ) is the national women's football team of Eritrea and is overseen by the Eritrean National Football Federation (ENFF), the governing body of football in Eritrea. It has neither qualified for the finals of the FIFA Women's World Cup nor the Africa Women Cup of Nations.

It is managed by Ghezai Tesfagabir and plays its home games in Asmara. As of 16 June 2026 and since 21 March 2008, Eritrea is unranked in the FIFA rankings because they did not play a recognised match within the last four years.

== Team image ==
=== Home stadium ===
The Eritrea women's national football team play their home matches on the Cicero Stadium.

== Results and fixtures ==
The following is a list of match results in the last 12 months, as well as any future matches that have been scheduled.

== Coaching staff ==
=== Current coaching staff ===
As of September 2022

Position	Name	Ref.
Head coach	??	

=== Manager history ===
- ??? (2022– )

== Players ==
=== Current squad ===
- The following players were named on 10 October 2021 for the 2022 Africa Women Cup of Nations qualification tournament.
- Caps and goals accurate up to and including 30 October 2021.

No.	Pos.	Player	Date of birth (age)	Club
	GK	Rim Redie		(Eritrean National Football Federation) Denden SC
	GK	Yosan Trieste		(Eritrean National Football Federation) Denden SC
	DF	Saron Goytom		(Eritrean National Football Federation) Insurance
	DF	Rim Bexam		(Eritrean National Football Federation) Denden SC
	DF	Misgana Mehari		(Eritrean National Football Federation) Denden SC
	DF	Hermiela Tedros		(Eritrean National Football Federation) Insurance
	DF	Diana Estifanos		(Eritrean National Football Federation) Denden SC
	DF	Helen Michael		(Eritrean National Football Federation) Denden SC
	DF	Thras Habte		(Eritrean National Football Federation) Insurance
	DF	Venus Habteselassie		(Eritrean National Football Federation) Insurance
	DF	Helen Yohannes		(Eritrean National Football Federation) Denden SC
	DF	Rahwa Mega		(Eritrean National Football Federation) Denden SC
	MF	Fithawit Yohannes		(Eritrean National Football Federation) Denden SC
	MF	Hermon Eyob		(Eritrean National Football Federation) Denden SC
	MF	Selam Kibrom		(Eritrean National Football Federation) Denden SC
	MF	Liya Elias		(Eritrean National Football Federation) Insurance
	MF	Luwam Solomon		(Eritrean National Football Federation) Insurance
	MF	Rahwa Teweldemedhin		(Eritrean National Football Federation) Insurance
	MF	Haben Goytom		(Eritrean National Football Federation) Denden SC
	FW	Fithawit Tewelde		(Eritrean National Football Federation) Insurance

=== Recent call-ups ===
The following players have been called up to an Eritrea squad in the past 12 months.

Pos.	Player	Date of birth (age)	Caps	Goals	Club	Latest call-up

== Head-to-head record ==
- need update

Against	Played	Won	Drawn	Lost	GF	GA	GD
Morocco	2	1	0	1	4	4	0
Tanzania	8	0	3	5	11	25	−14
Total	10	1	3	6	15	29	−14

== Competitive record ==
=== FIFA Women's World Cup ===
FIFA Women's World Cup record									Qualification record					
Year	Result	Position	Pld	W	D	L	GF	GA	Pld	W	D	L	GF	GA
(China) 1991	Part of Ethiopia													
(Sweden) 1995	Not a FIFA member													
(United States) 1999	Ineligible (Note: The Eritrean National Football Federation was recognised in 1998, shortly after qualification started.)													
(United States) 2003	Did not qualify								2	0	1	1	4	5
(China) 2007	Withdrew								–	–	–	–	–	–
(Germany) 2011	Did not qualify								2	0	1	1	4	11
(Canada) 2015	Did not enter								–	–	–	–	–	–
(France) 2019	Did not enter								–	–	–	–	–	–
(Australia) (New Zealand) 2023	Did not qualify								2	0	0	2	0	6
(Brazil) 2027	Did not enter								–	–	–	–	–	–
(Costa Rica) (Jamaica) (Mexico) (United States) 2031	To be determined								–	–	–	–	–	–
(England) (Northern Ireland) (Scotland) (Wales) 2035	To be determined								–	–	–	–	–	–
Total	–	0/3	–	–	–	–	–	–	6	0	2	4	8	22

=== Olympic Games ===
Summer Olympics record									Qualification record					
Year	Result	Position	Pld	W	D	L	GF	GA	Pld	W	D	L	GF	GA
(United States) 1996	Ineligible								–	–	–	–	–	–
(Australia) 2000	Ineligible								–	–	–	–	–	–
(Greece) 2004	Did not enter								–	–	–	–	–	–
(China) 2008	Did not qualify								2	1	0	1	4	4
(United Kingdom) 2012	Did not enter								–	–	–	–	–	–
(Brazil) 2016	Did not enter								–	–	–	–	–	–
(Japan) 2021	Did not enter								–	–	–	–	–	–
(France) 2024	Did not enter								–	–	–	–	–	–
(United States) 2028	Did not enter								–	–	–	–	–	–
Total	–	0/1	–	–	–	–	–	–	2	1	0	1	4	4

=== Africa Women Cup of Nations ===
Africa Women Cup of Nations record									Qualification record					
Year	Result	Position	Pld	W	D	L	GF	GA	Pld	W	D	L	GF	GA
1991	Part of Ethiopia													
1995	Not a CAF member													
(Nigeria) 1998	Did not enter								–	–	–	–	–	–
(South Africa) 2000	Did not enter								–	–	–	–	–	–
(Nigeria) 2002	Did not qualify								2	0	1	1	4	5
(South Africa) 2004	Did not qualify								2	0	1	1	1	5
(Nigeria) 2006	Withdrew								–	–	–	–	–	–
(Equatorial Guinea) 2008	Did not qualify								2	0	0	2	2	4
(South Africa) 2010	Did not qualify								2	0	1	1	4	11
(Equatorial Guinea) 2012	Did not enter								–	–	–	–	–	–
(Namibia) 2014	Did not enter								–	–	–	–	–	–
(Cameroon) 2016	Did not enter								–	–	–	–	–	–
(Ghana) 2018	Did not enter								–	–	–	–	–	–
(Republic of the Congo) 2020	Did not enter, tournament was later canceled								–	–	–	–	–	–
(Morocco) 2022	Did not qualify								2	0	0	2	0	6
(Morocco) 2024	Did not enter								–	–	–	–	–	–
(Morocco) 2026	Did not enter								–	–	–	–	–	–
Total	–	0/5	–	–	–	–	–	–	10	0	3	7	11	31

=== African Games ===
African Games record									Qualification record					
Year	Result	Position	Pld	W	D	L	GF	GA	Pld	W	D	L	GF	GA
(Nigeria) 2003	Did not enter								No qualifying process					
(Algeria) 2007	Did not enter								–	–	–	–	–	–
(Mozambique) 2011	Did not enter								–	–	–	–	–	–
(Republic of the Congo) 2015	Did not enter								–	–	–	–	–	–
(Morocco) 2019	Did not enter								–	–	–	–	–	–
(Ghana) 2023	Did not qualify (Note: Eritrea was knocked out in the second round of the 2022 African U-20 Women's World Cup qualification.)								4	2	0	2	6	6
Total	–	0/1	–	–	–	–	–	–	4	2	0	2	6	6

=== CECAFA Women's Championship ===
CECAFA Women's Championship
Year	Round	GP	W	D*	L	GS	GA	GD
(Zanzibar) 1986	Part of Ethiopia							
(Uganda) 2016	Did not enter							
(Rwanda) 2018	Did not enter							
(Tanzania) 2019	Did not enter							
(Djibouti) 2021	Cancelled							
(Uganda) 2022	Did not enter							
(Tanzania) 2025	Did not enter							
Total	0/0	0	0	0	0	0	0	0
