= Amina Bilali =

Tanzanian footballer

Amina Ally Bilali is a Tanzanian professional footballer who plays as a midfielder for Yanga Princess and captains the Tanzania women's national team.

== International career ==
Ally captained the Tanzania women's national team at the 2020 COSAFA Women's Championship and the 2021 COSAFA Women's Championship.

She was adjudged the man of the match of the final against Malawi which they won by 1–0 via a goal from Enekia Kasonga and later the player of the tournament.

== Honours ==
- CECAFA Women's Championship: 2018
- COSAFA Women's Championship: 2021
- COSAFA Women's Championship Player of the tournament: 2021
