= Suavis Iratunga =

Burundian football referee (born 1987)

Suavis Iratunga (born 30 December 1987) is a Burundian football referee.

== Early life ==
Iratunga started playing football at school. Iratunga attended the University of Burundi in Burundi.

== Career ==
She refereed at the 2022 Women's Africa Cup of Nations. Iratunga received controversy for disallowing a goal Zimbabwe scored during a 0–1 loss to Egypt.
