= Asha Rashid =

Tanzanian footballer

Personal information
- Position: Forward

International career
Years	Team	Apps	(Gls)
- Tanzania

Asha Rashid is a Tanzanian footballer who plays as a forward for the Tanzanian women's national team.
