= 2019 CECAFA Women's Championship =

Tournament details
- Host country: Tanzania
- Dates: 16–25 November 2019
- Teams: 8 (from 1 sub-confederation)

Final positions
- Champions: Kenya (1st title)
- Runners-up: Tanzania
- Third place: Uganda
- Fourth place: Burundi

Tournament statistics
- Top scorer(s): (Kenya) Jentrix Shikangwa (10 goals)
- Best player: (Tanzania) Mwanahamis Omary

The 2019 CECAFA Women's Championship was the fourth edition of the association football tournament for women's national teams in the East African region.

It was held in Dar es Salaam, Tanzania between 16 and 25 November 2019. Kenya won the tournament with a 2–0 win over Tanzania in the final.

== Participants and draw ==
Group A

- Tanzania (hosts)
- Burundi
- Zanzibar
- South Sudan

Group B

- Uganda
- Ethiopia
- Djibouti
- Kenya

== Group stage ==
=== Group A ===
Pos	Team	Pld	W	D	L	GF	GA	GD	Pts	Qualification
1	Tanzania (H)	3	3	0	0	20	0	+20	9	Semi-finals
2	Burundi	3	2	0	1	8	4	+4	6	Semi-finals
3	South Sudan	3	1	0	2	5	12	−7	3	
4	Zanzibar	3	0	0	3	0	17	−17	0	

Updated to match(es) played on 18 November 2019. Source: soccerway.com
(H) Hosts
16 November 2019
14:00

Burundi	5–0	Zanzibar
Saidi Sakina 24', 26'; Sandrine Niyonkuru 50'; Aziza Mwadini (?); Aniella Umimana 88'	Report

Chamazi Stadium, Mbagala
16 November 2019
14:30

Tanzania	9–0	South Sudan
Omary Mwanahamisi 17', 41', 46'; Donisa Minja 32'; Stumai Abdallah 47', 50'; Julitha Tamuwahi 52'; Clement Sanga (?), 87'	Report

Chamazi Stadium, Mbagala

18 November 2019
14:00

South Sudan	5–0	Zanzibar
Amy Lasu 24', 82'; Suzy Iriamba 39'; Mwajuma 62' (o.g.); Manyol 77'

Chamazi Stadium, Mbagala
Referee: Asnakech Gebre
18 November 2019
14:30

Burundi	0–4	Tanzania
	Report	Donisia Minja 36', 65'; Asha Rashid 72'; Omary Mwanahamisi 86'

Chamazi Stadium, Mbagala
Referee: Shamirah Namadda

20 November 2019
14:00

South Sudan	0–3	Burundi
		Annet Adebo Vita Nakirijja 10' (o.g.); Sakina Saidi 54' (pen.); Charlotte Irankunda 90+1'

Chamazi Stadium, Mbagala
20 November 2019
14:30

Tanzania	7–0	Zanzibar
Donisia Minja 26', 56'; Diana Msewa 33'; Philomena Daniel 71'; Asha Rashid 85', 87'; Anastazia Katunzi 90'

Chamazi Stadium, Mbagala

=== Group B ===
Pos	Team	Pld	W	D	L	GF	GA	GD	Pts	Qualification
1	Kenya	3	3	0	0	17	0	+17	9	Semi-finals
2	Uganda	3	2	0	1	14	3	+11	6	Semi-finals
3	Ethiopia	3	1	0	2	8	3	+5	3	
4	Djibouti	3	0	0	3	0	33	−33	0	

Updated to match(es) played on 18 November 2019. Source: soccerway.com
17 November 2019
14:00

Ethiopia	0–2	Kenya
	Report	Shikangwa 79'; Shilwatso 82'

Chamazi Stadium, Mbagala
17 November 2019
14:30

Uganda	13–0	Djibouti
Nalukenge 2', 16', 22', 45', 66'; Nassuna 18' (pen.), 32' (?); Ikwaput 40', 50', 62'; Najjemba 65'; Nababi (?)	Report

Chamazi Stadium, Mbagala

19 November 2019
14:00

Kenya	12–0	Djibouti
Nasaka 13'; Shikangwa 14', 17' (pen.), 56'; Adam 34'; Bundi 45'; Airo 53' (pen.), 61', 65'	Report

Chamazi Stadium, Mbagala
19 November 2019
14:30

Uganda	1–0	Ethiopia
Najjemba (?)

Chamazi Stadium, Mbagala

21 November 2019

Djibouti	0–8	Ethiopia

21 November 2019

Kenya	3–0	Uganda

== Knockout stage ==
=== Semi-finals ===
23 November 2019

Tanzania	1–0	Uganda
Asha Rashid 90+1'	Report

23 November 2019

Kenya	5–0	Burundi
Nixon 14'; Shikangwa 45', 71'; Adam 68'; Corazone 77'	Report

=== Third-place playoff ===
25 November 2019

Burundi	0–2	Uganda
		Nababi 61'; Nalugya 85'

=== Final ===
25 November 2019

Tanzania	0–2	Kenya
	Report	Shikangwa 70', 81' (pen.)

== Awards ==
Jentrix Shikangwa from Kenya won the top scorer award with 10 goals. The Golden Glove Award went to Kenyan goalkeeper Annedy Kundu who did not concede a single goal in the whole tournament. Tanzania's Mwanahamisi Shurua was voted Most Valuable Player and her team also bagged the Fair Play Award.
