= South Sudan women's national football team =

Women's national association football team representing South Sudan

South Sudan
- Nickname: Bright Starlets
- Association: South Sudan Football Association (SSFA)
- Confederation: CAF (Africa)
- Sub-confederation: CECAFA (East & Central Africa)
- Head coach: Sidi Mohammed Karouane
- Captain: Amy Lasu
- Top scorer: Luka Deborah (6)
- FIFA code: SSD
First colours

FIFA ranking
- Current: 195 ▼1 (16 June 2026)
- Highest: 175 (December 2021)
- Lowest: 195 (December 2025)

First international
- Tanzania 9–0 South Sudan (Dar es Salaam, Tanzania, 16 November 2019)

Biggest win
- Sudan 0–6 South Sudan (Khartoum, Sudan, 16 February 2022)

Biggest defeat
- Ethiopia 11–0 South Sudan (Addis Ababa, Ethiopia, 10 April 2021)

The South Sudan women's national team represents South Sudan in international women's football competitions.

== History ==
South Sudan gained its independent from Sudan in 2011. That same year the women's team was created.

The team then gained Confederation of African Football (CAF) membership in February 2012 and full FIFA membership in May.

They played their first international competition at the 2019 CECAFA Women's Championship where they lost their first game 0–9 on16 November 2019 against Tanzania, achieved their first win in their second match 5 - 0 vs Zanzibar on 18 November 2019, and two days later on 20 November 2019, dropped their third game 0 - 5 against Burundi. The team was eliminated in the group stage. Kenya women national team went on to win the tournament with 2 - 0 victory over Tanzania women national team.

== Team image ==
=== Nicknames ===
The South Sudan women's national football team has been known or nicknamed as the "Bright Starlets" derived from the men's national team "Bright Star".

== Results and fixtures ==
The following is a list of match results in the last 12 months, as well as any future matches that have been scheduled.

Legend

Win Draw Lose Fixture

=== 2026 ===
6 June 2026 2028 Olympic Qualification First round	South Sudan	1–1	Madagascar	Juba
15:00 UTC+2	Albert 56'	Report	Razananivo 18'	Stadium: Juba Stadium; Referee: Josephine Nantongo (Uganda)

9 June 2026 2028 Olympic Qualification First round	Madagascar	1–0 (2–1 agg.)	South Sudan	Juba (South Sudan)
15:00 UTC+2	Razanarisoa 90+3'	Report		Stadium: Juba Stadium; Referee: Vistoria Shangula (Namibia)

== All-time record ==
As of match played 21 June 2025 against Burundi
Key

Positive balance (more wins than losses)
Neutral balance (as many wins as losses)
Negative balance (more losses than wins)

The following table shows South Sudan's all-time official international record per opponent:

Opponent	Pld	W	D	L	GF	GA	GD	W%	Confederation
Algeria	2	0	0	2	0	8	−8	00.00	CAF
Botswana	1	0	0	1	0	7	−7	00.00	CAF
Burundi	2	1	0	1	3	4	−1	50.00	CAF
Egypt	2	0	0	2	0	8	−8	00.00	CAF
Ethiopia	3	0	0	3	0	18	−18	00.00	CAF
Kenya	3	0	0	3	1	19	−18	00.00	CAF
Seychelles	1	1	0	0	5	1	+4	100.00	CAF
Sudan	2	2	0	0	9	0	+9	100.00	CAF
Tanzania	5	0	0	5	0	21	−21	00.00	CAF
Uganda	1	0	0	1	0	5	−5	00.00	CAF
Zanzibar	2	2	0	0	6	0	+6	100.00	—
Zimbabwe	1	0	0	1	1	2	−1	00.00	CAF
Total	25	6	0	19	25	93	−68	24.00	—

== Coaching staff ==
=== Current coaching staff ===
As of 14 June 2025

Staff
Role	Name
Head Coach	Simon James Yor Kak
Assistant Coach	Cinderela Mathew Sebit Daniel
Goalkeeper Coach	Mohammed Seifeldin Both Diu
Physical Trainer	Brin George Lou Walla
Physiotherapists	Rose Hakim Maze
Team Doctor	Poni Anna Wani
Equipment Manager	Charity Samuel Laku Soro

=== Manager history ===
- Sarah Edward (2011–20??)
- Sabino Domaso (20??)
- Moses Machar Akol (2019)
- Sabino Domaso (20??–20??)
- Shilene Booysen (2021–2023)
- Sidi Mohamed Karoune( 2023-2024)
- Simon James Yor Kak( 2025-)

== Players ==
=== Current squad ===
As of 9 June 2026

The following players were called up for the 2028 LA Olympic Qualifiers preliminary round fixtures against Madagascar on 6 and 9 June 2026.

Caps and goals correct as of 9 June 2026, after the second leg match against Madagascar.

No.	Pos.	Player	Date of birth (age)	Club
1	GK	Khalda Hassan	16 December 2004 (age 21)	(South Sudan Football Association) Yei Joint Stars
12	GK	Asunta Emmanuel		(South Sudan Football Association)
2	DF	Filda Amadrio		(South Sudan Football Association) Yei Joint Stars
3	DF	Annet Adebo		(South Sudan Football Association) Yei Joint Stars
4	DF	Dorka Lam	24 November 1999 (age 26)	(South Sudan Football Association)
5	DF	Diana Emmanuel		(South Sudan Football Association)
14	DF	Rutha Night		(South Sudan Football Association)
6	MF	Amy Lasu (Captain)	8 November 1995 (age 30)	(Hellenic Football Federation) OFI
8	MF	Mary Dawa		(South Sudan Football Association) Yei Joint Stars
10	MF	Anger Bol		(South Sudan Football Association)
13	MF	Ludia Maika		(South Sudan Football Association)
15	MF	Malili		(South Sudan Football Association)
7	FW	Luka Deborah		(South Sudan Football Association) Yei Joint Stars
9	FW	Makuach		(South Sudan Football Association)

=== Recent call-ups ===
The following players have been called up to a South Sudan squad in the past 12 months.

Pos.	Player	Date of birth (age)	Caps	Goals	Club	Latest call-up

=== Previous squads ===
COSAFA Women's Championship

- 2021 COSAFA Women's Championship squads

CECAFA Women's Championship

- 2022 CECAFA Women's Championship squads
- 2025 CECAFA Women's Championship squads

== Records ==
*Active players in bold, statistics correct as of 16 July 2022.

=== Most capped players ===
#	Player	Year(s)	Caps

=== Top goalscorers ===
#	Player	Year(s)	Goals	Caps
1	Luka Deborah	2022	6	9
2	chiang Tomas	2022	3	???
3	Amy Lasu	2019	2	5
4	Suzy Iriamba	2019	1	?
5	Manyol	2019	1	3
6	Makuei Josephine	2021	1	?
7	Chieng Riek	2021	1	?
8	Sarah Aparo	2022	1	??
9	Diana Padonyi	2022	1	???

== Competitive record ==
=== FIFA Women's World Cup ===
FIFA Women's World Cup record
Year	Round	GP	W	D*	L	GF	GA	GD
(Canada) 2015	Did not qualify							
(France) 2019	Did not enter							
(Australia) (New Zealand) 2023	Did not qualify							
(Brazil) 2027	To be determined							
**Total**	0/4	0	0	0	0	0	0	0

=== Olympic Games ===
Summer Olympics record
Year	Result	Pld	W	D*	L	GS	GA	GD
(United States) 1996	Did not qualify							
(Australia) 2000	Did not qualify							
(Greece) 2004	Did not qualify							
(China) 2008	Did not qualify							
(United Kingdom) 2012	Did not qualify							
(Brazil) 2016	Did not qualify							
(Japan) 2020	Did not qualify							
(France) 2024	Did not qualify							
Total	0/8	0	0	0	0	0	0	0

*Draws include knockout matches decided on penalty kicks.

=== Africa Women Cup of Nations ===
The team was in the draw for qualifying to the 2014 African Championship, but had withdrawn from their first round match against Ethiopia.

Africa Women Cup of Nations record
Year	Round	GP	W	D*	L	GF	GA	GD
(Equatorial Guinea) 2012	Did not enter							
(Namibia) 2014	Did not qualify							
(Cameroon) 2016	Did not enter							
(Ghana) 2018	Did not enter							
2020	Cancelled due to COVID-19 pandemic in Africa							
(Morocco) 2022	Did not qualify							
(Morocco) 2024	Did not qualify							
**Total**	0/4	0	0	0	0	0	0	0

*Draws include knockout matches decided on penalty kicks.

=== African Games ===
African Games record
Year	Round	GP	W	D	L	GS	GA
(Nigeria) 2003	Did not qualify						
(Algeria) 2007	Did not qualify						
(Mozambique) 2011	Did not qualify						
(Republic of the Congo) 2015	Did not qualify						
(Morocco) 2019	Did not qualify						
(Ghana) 2023	Did not qualify						
Total	**2/4**	0	0	0	0	0	0

=== CECAFA Women's Championship ===
CECAFA Women's Championship
Year	Round	GP	W	D*	L	GS	GA	GD
(Zanzibar) 1986
(Uganda) 2016	Did not qualify							
(Rwanda) 2018	Did not qualify							
(Tanzania) 2019	**Groupe stage**	3	1	0	2	5	12	−7
(Tanzania) 2021	Cancelled							
(Uganda) 2022	**Groupe stage**	3	1	0	2	1	6	−5
**Total**	2/5	6	2	0	4	6	18	−12

== See also ==
- Sport in South Sudan
  - Football in South Sudan
    - Women's football in South Sudan
- South Sudan women's national under-20 football team
- South Sudan women's national under-17 football team
- South Sudan national football team
