= Djibouti women's national football team =

Djibouti
- Association: Djiboutian Football Federation
- Confederation: CAF (Africa)
- Sub-confederation: CECAFA (East Africa & Central Africa)
- Head coach: (Djibouti) Hassan kako
- FIFA code: DJI
| First colours | Second colours |

FIFA ranking
- Current: 197 ▼1 (16 June 2026)
- Highest: 195 (March – August 2025)
- Lowest: 197 (December 2025)

First international
- Kenya 7–0 Djibouti (Kenya; 26 March 2006)

Biggest win
- Djibouti 4–1 Somalia (Djibouti City, Djibouti; 24 October 2025)

Biggest defeat
- Uganda 13–0 Djibouti (17 November 2019)

World Cup
- Appearances: 0

Olympic Games
- Appearances: 0

African Women's Championship
- Appearances: 0

The Djibouti women's national football team represents the country in international competitions. Football is organised by the Djiboutian Football Federation, with women's football formally organised in the country in 2002, and a national team was later created.

== History ==
=== Background ===
The country became independent in 1977. The Djiboutian Football Federation was founded in 1977 and joined FIFA in 1994. Football is one of the most popular sports in the country. Women's football development in Africa has to deal with several challenges that impact the ability to develop a high level of play, including limited access to education, poverty amongst women in the wider society, and fundamental inequality present in the society that occasionally allows for female specific human rights abuses. When high level women's players are developed, many leave the country seeking greater opportunity in Northern Europe or the United States. Another issue facing women's football in Africa is that most of the money for the game does not come from national football federations but instead from FIFA.

By 1985, few countries had their own women's national football teams. Djibouti was no exception: women's football was not officially organized in the country until 2002 and then, only for players sixteen years and older. As of 2009, there were only eight women's clubs for these players in the country. There is a regional and national women's competition, which was established in 2007. The league provided the first opportunity for women outside the capital and major cities to play football. The country has a women's national team but has no youth teams, meaning no U17 or U20 teams. 12% of the money from the FIFA Financial Assistance Programme (FAP) is targeted at the technical development of the game, which includes women's football, sport medicine and futsal. This compares to 11% specifically set aside for men's competitions and 10% set aside for youth football. Between 1991 and 2010, there was no FIFA FUTURO III regional course for women's coaching. A FUTURO III regional course men's coaching workshop was hosted in 2008. In 2007, there was a women's football seminar held in the country. In 2007, there was a FIFA MA course held for women/youth football.

=== Performance ===
Between 1977 and April 2012, Djibouti women's national football team played in only one FIFA sanctioned match. It was played in Nairobi on 26 March 2006, with Kenya women's national football team winning 7–0, holding a lead of 4–0 over Djibouti at the half. The women's national team has not competed at the Women's World Cup. They played two non-sanctioned games, one in 2004 and one in 2005. In March 2012, the team was not ranked in the world by FIFA and did not formally exist.

== Results and fixtures ==
The following is a list of match results in the last 12 months, as well as any future matches that have been scheduled.

Legend

Win Draw Lose Fixture

=== 2025 ===
| 24 October 2025 Friendly | Djibouti | 4–1 | Somalia | Djibouti City, Djibouti |
| 16:00 UTC+3 | Doubad 27', 68', 85'; Gouled 46' | | Okiyaale 12' | Stadium: Académie de Douda |

=== 2026 ===
| 4 June 2026 2028 Olympic Qualification First round | Mauritius | 2–1 | Djibouti | Saint Pierre |
| 19:00 UTC+4 | Clair 1'; Gopal 90+6' (pen.) | Report | Geremew 38' | Stadium: Côte d'Or National Sports Complex; Referee: Nonjabulo Nonhle Ndlela (South Africa) |

| 8 June 2026 2028 Olympic Qualification First round | Djibouti | 0–1 (1-3 agg.) | Mauritius | Saint Pierre (Mauritius) |
| 17:30 UTC+4 | | Report | Fourneau 75' | Stadium: Côte d'Or National Sports Complex |

- Results and Fixtures – Soccerway.com
- globalsportsarchive

== Coaching staff ==
=== Current coaching staff ===
update 14 September 2023

| Position | Name | Ref. |
|---|---|---|
| Head coach | (Djibouti) Mohamed Abdourahman Mahamoud | |
| Assistant coach | (Djibouti) Mohamed Idriss Ahmed | |

=== Manager history ===
(Djibouti) Mohamed Abdourahman Mahamoud (2023-)

- (Djibouti) Hassan Kako (2022–2023)
- (Djibouti) Mawlid Ali Beilleh (2021–2022)
- (France) Samy Smaili (2020–2021)

== Players ==
=== Current squad ===
The following 18 players were called up for the 2028 LA Olympic Qualifiers preliminary round fixtures against Mauritius on 4 and 8 June 2026.

Caps and goals correct as of 8 June 2026, after the second leg match against Mauritius.

| No. | Pos. | Player | Date of birth (age) | Caps | Club | |
|---|---|---|---|---|---|---|
| 1 | GK | Soubane Ahmed Omar | July 24, 2004 (age 22) | 14 | 0 | (Djiboutian Football Federation) FAD |
| 12 | GK | Carren Jebichii Rutto | January 1, 2009 (age 17) | 2 | 0 | (Djiboutian Football Federation) UJQ4 |
| 2 | DF | Soumeya Yacin Moussa | October 28, 2005 (age 21) | 12 | 0 | (Djiboutian Football Federation) FAD |
| 3 | DF | Meski Mohamed Hagayo | November 6, 2003 (age 23) | 10 | 0 | (Djiboutian Football Federation) FC Hodan |
| 4 | DF | Hibo Abdi Abdillahi | September 8, 1994 (age 32) | 18 | 1 | (Djiboutian Football Federation) FC Hodan |
| 5 | DF | Ayan Houssein Abdallahi | August 25, 2009 (age 17) | 4 | 0 | (Djiboutian Football Federation) FAD |
| 14 | DF | Ikram Ali Moussa | December 6, 2003 (age 22) | 8 | 0 | (Djiboutian Football Federation) FC Hodan |
| 16 | DF | Ilham Djama Douhour | January 13, 2001 (age 25) | 11 | 0 | (Djiboutian Football Federation) FAD |
| 19 | DF | Hana Setiye Yimer | January 1, 2009 (age 17) | 3 | 0 | (Djiboutian Football Federation) FC Hodan |
| 6 | MF | Mariam Mari Ahmed Miguil | November 26, 2000 (age 25) | 15 | 2 | (Djiboutian Football Federation) FC UJECO |
| 8 | MF | Assia Hassan Abdallah | December 18, 2002 (age 23) | 9 | 0 | (Djiboutian Football Federation) FC UJECO |
| 13 | MF | Yousra Mohamed Awad (Captain) | September 13, 1999 (age 27) | 21 | 3 | (Djiboutian Football Federation) FAD |
| 15 | MF | Mouna Abdillahi Dabar | September 15, 2001 (age 25) | 7 | 0 | (Djiboutian Football Federation) FAD |
| 7 | FW | Fardoussa Ali Doubad | November 11, 2004 (age 22) | 16 | 6 | (Djiboutian Football Federation) FAD |
| 9 | FW | Filsane Djama Ibrahim | May 1, 2004 (age 22) | 10 | 1 | (Djiboutian Football Federation) FC Hodan |
| 11 | FW | Nadia Mahamoud Nour | September 29, 1998 (age 28) | 13 | 2 | (Djiboutian Football Federation) FAD |
| 17 | FW | Rahma Moustapha Aden | February 4, 1998 (age 28) | 8 | 1 | (Djiboutian Football Federation) FAD |
| 18 | FW | Ferouze Mohamed Issa | January 30, 2004 (age 22) | 5 | 0 | (Djiboutian Football Federation) FAD |

=== Recent call-ups ===
The following players have been called up to a Djibouti squad in the past 12 months.

| Pos. | Player | Date of birth (age) | Caps | Goals | Club | Latest call-up |

=== Previous squads ===
CECAFA Women's Championship

- 2022 CECAFA Women's Championship squads

== Records ==
- Active players in **bold**, statistics correct as of 2020.

=== Most capped players ===
| # | Player | Year(s) | Caps |

=== Top goalscorers ===
| # | Player | Year(s) | Goals | Caps |

== Competitive record ==
Champions Runners-up Third place Fourth place

=== FIFA Women's World Cup ===
FIFA Women's World Cup record
| Year | Result | Pld | W | D* | L | GS | GA | GD |
|---|---|---|---|---|---|---|---|---|
| (China) 1991 | did not exist | | | | | | | |
| (Sweden) 1995 | did not exist | | | | | | | |
| (United States) 1999 | did not exist | | | | | | | |
| (United States) 2003 | did not exist | | | | | | | |
| (China) 2007 | did not enter | | | | | | | |
| (Germany) 2011 | did not enter | | | | | | | |
| (Canada) 2015 | did not enter | | | | | | | |
| (France) 2019 | did not enter | | | | | | | |
| (Australia) (New Zealand) 2023 | did not Qualify | | | | | | | |
| (Brazil) 2027 | did not Qualify | | | | | | | |
| Total | 0/10 | 0 | 0 | 0 | 0 | 0 | 0 | 0 |

*Draws include knockout matches decided on penalty kicks.

=== Olympic Games ===
Summer Olympics record
| Year | Result | Pld | W | D* | L | GS | GA | GD |
|---|---|---|---|---|---|---|---|---|
| (United States) 1996 | did not exist | | | | | | | |
| (Australia) 2000 | did not exist | | | | | | | |
| (Greece) 2004 | did not exist | | | | | | | |
| (China) 2008 | did not enter | | | | | | | |
| (United Kingdom) 2012 | did not enter | | | | | | | |
| (Brazil) 2016 | did not enter | | | | | | | |
| (Japan) 2020 | did not enter | | | | | | | |
| (France) 2024 | did not enter | | | | | | | |
| (United States) 2028 | did not qualify | | | | | | | |
| Total | 0/9 | 0 | 0 | 0 | 0 | 0 | 0 | 0 |

*Draws include knockout matches decided on penalty kicks.

=== Africa Women Cup of Nations ===
Africa Women Cup of Nations
| Year | Round | GP | W | D* | L | GS | GA | GD |
|---|---|---|---|---|---|---|---|---|
| 1991 to (Nigeria) 2004 | did not exist | | | | | | | |
| (Gabon) 2006 | did not Qualify | | | | | | | |
| (Equatorial Guinea) 2008 to (Republic of the Congo) 2018 | did not enter | | | | | | | |
| 2020 | Cancelled due to COVID-19 pandemic in Africa | | | | | | | |
| (Morocco) 2022 | did not Qualify | | | | | | | |
| (Morocco) 2024 | did not Qualify | | | | | | | |
| (Morocco) 2026 | did not Qualify | | | | | | | |
| **Total** | 0/14 | 0 | 0 | 0 | 0 | 0 | 0 | 0 |

(The former format was amended as it did not comply with MOS:FLAG as discussed here)

*Draws include knockout matches decided on penalty kicks.

=== African Games ===
African Games record
| Year | Result | Matches | Wins | Draws | Losses | GF | GA | GD |
|---|---|---|---|---|---|---|---|---|
| (Nigeria) 2003 | Did Not exist | | | | | | | |
| (Algeria) 2007 | Did not qualify | | | | | | | |
| (Mozambique) 2011 | Did Not Enter | | | | | | | |
| (Republic of the Congo) 2015 | Did Not Enter | | | | | | | |
| (Morocco) 2019 | Did Not Enter | | | | | | | |
| (Republic of the Congo) 2023 | to be determined | | | | | | | |
| Total | 0/4 | 0 | 0 | 0 | 0 | 0 | 0 | 0 |

=== CECAFA Women's Championship ===
CECAFA Women's Championship
| Year | Round | GP | W | D* | L | GS | GA | GD |
|---|---|---|---|---|---|---|---|---|
| (Zanzibar) 1986 | did not exist | | | | | | | |
| (Uganda) 2016 | did not enter | | | | | | | |
| (Rwanda) 2018 | did not enter | | | | | | | |
| (Tanzania) 2019 | **Groupe stage** | 3 | 0 | 0 | 3 | 0 | 33 | −33 |
| (Djibouti) 2021 | Cancelled | | | | | | | |
| (Uganda) 2022 | **Groupe stage** | 3 | 0 | 0 | 3 | 0 | 10 | −10 |
| **Total** | 2/5 | 6 | 0 | 0 | 6 | 0 | −43 | −43 |

== All−time record against FIFA recognized nations ==
The list shown below shows the Djibouti national football team all−time international record against opposing nations.
*As of xxxxxx after match against xxxx.

Key

Positive balance (more wins than losses)
Neutral balance (as many wins as losses)
Negative balance (more losses than wins)

| Against | Pld | W | D | L | GF | GA | GD | Confederation |

=== Record per opponent ===
*As of xxxxx after match against xxxxx.

Key

Positive balance (more wins than losses)
Neutral balance (as many wins as losses)
Negative balance (more losses than wins)

The following table shows Djibouti's all-time official international record per opponent:

| Opponent | Pld | W | D | L | GF | GA | GD | W% | Confederation |
| Total | | | | | | | | | — |

== See also ==
- Sport in Djibouti
  - Football in Djibouti
    - Women's football in Djibouti
- Djibouti women's national under-20 football team
- Djibouti women's national under-17 football team
- Djibouti men's national football team
