= Mwanahamisi Shurua =

Tanzanian footballer

Mwanahamisi Omary Shurua (born 16 October 1989) is a Tanzanian professional footballer who plays as a forward for Simba Queens and the Tanzania women's national team.

== International career ==
In 2018, Shurua scored one goal in their run to winning the 2018 CECAFA Women's Championship after scoring Ethiopia 4–1 in their final group match.

== Honours ==
- CECAFA Women's Championship: 2018
