= Njeru =

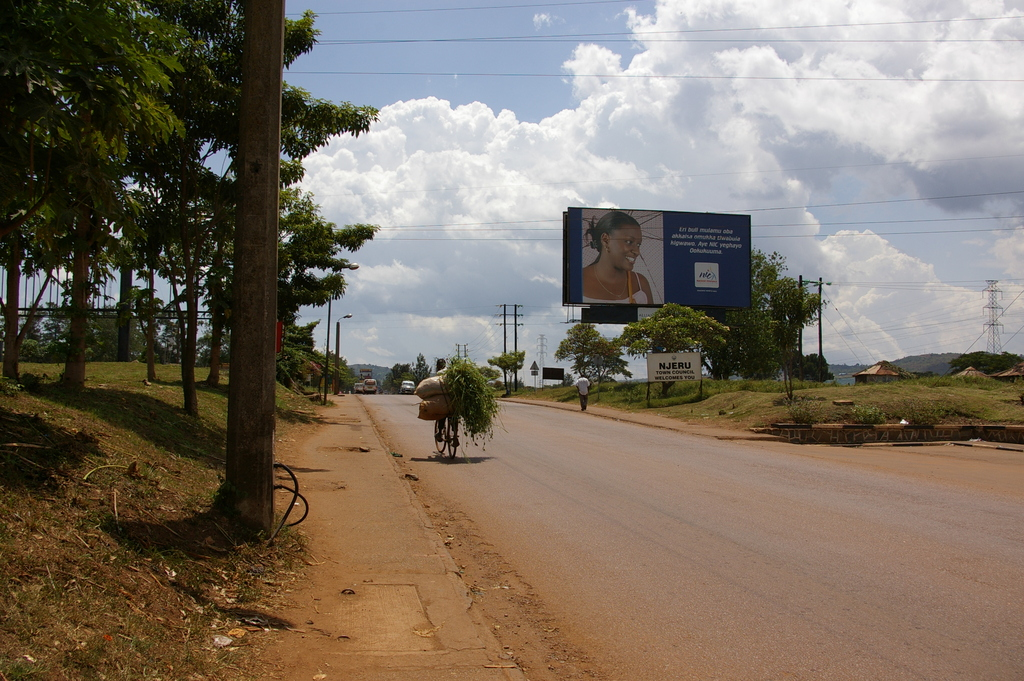
- Njeru, Uganda

- Map of Uganda showing the location of Njeru.
- Coordinates: 0°25′52″N 33°08′52″E
- Country: Uganda
- Region: Central Region
- District: Buikwe District
- County: Buikwe County
- Constituency: Buikwe North

Government
  - Member of Parliament: Kakoba Onyango
- Elevation: 1,100 m (3,600 ft)

Population (2024 Estimate)
  - Total: 201,484
- Time zone: UTC+3 (EAT)

Njeru is a town in Buikwe District, in the Central Region of Uganda. It is the largest town in the district. It is mainly a residential town. However, it hosts industries such as East African Packaging Solutions Limited, a manufacturer of paper packaging supplies, Nile Breweries Limited, a subsidiary of AB InBev and Nyanza Textile Industries Limited (Nytil), a textile manufacturer.

== Location ==
Njeru is located approximately 38 kilometres (24 mi) northeast of Buikwe, where the district headquarters are located. This location lies about 7.5 kilometres (5 mi) west of downtown Jinja. The town is located across the River Nile from the city of Jinja and is functionally a suburb of that city. The coordinate of Njeru Town Council are:0°25'52.0"N, 33°08'52.0"E (Latitude:0.431111; Longitude:33.147778).

== Economic activity ==
There are several industries and businesses located in Njeru that provide employment to a significant number of people and contribute significantly to the economy of Uganda. Some of these include:

1. Nile Breweries Limited, a subsidiary of SAB Miller, based in South Africa and ultimately of AB InBev of Belgium

2. Nalubaale Power Station - Installed Capacity 180 MW, owned by the Ugandan government. Operated under concession by Eskom (Uganda), a subsidiary of Eskom

3. East African Packaging Solutions - A 50/50 joint venture between the Madhvani Group and Graphic Systems Limited.

4. Nile Vocational Institute - A technical college with over 100 students founded by German charity Kindernothilfe

5. Vitafoam Industries - A Factory Manufacturing Mattresses.

6. Njeru Stock Farm - Formerly a government livestock farm, now used as an Army Detach.

7. Nytil Picfare - The biggest garments factory in Uganda, making garments out of locally grown organic cotton.

== Transportation ==
Both the old Kampala-Jinja Highway and the new Kampala–Jinja Expressway, pass through Njeru and are part of the northern corridor of the Trans-Africa Highway. The Kampala–Jinja Expressway connects to the Source of the Nile Bridge in Njeru.

== Population ==
In 2014, the national population census put the population of Njeru at 159,549. In 2020, UBOS estimated the population of Njeru at 178,800 people. The population agency calculated the average annual growth rate of the town's population at 1.97 percent every year, between 2014 and 2020.

Historical population
Year	Pop.	±%
2014	159,549	—
2020	178,800	+12.1%

== See also ==
- Isimba Power Station
- Bujagali Power Station
- Kiira Power Station
- List of cities and towns in Uganda
