= Chamazi Stadium =

Stadium in Dar es Salaam, Tanzania

- Kiwanja cha Michezo cha Chamazi (Swahili)
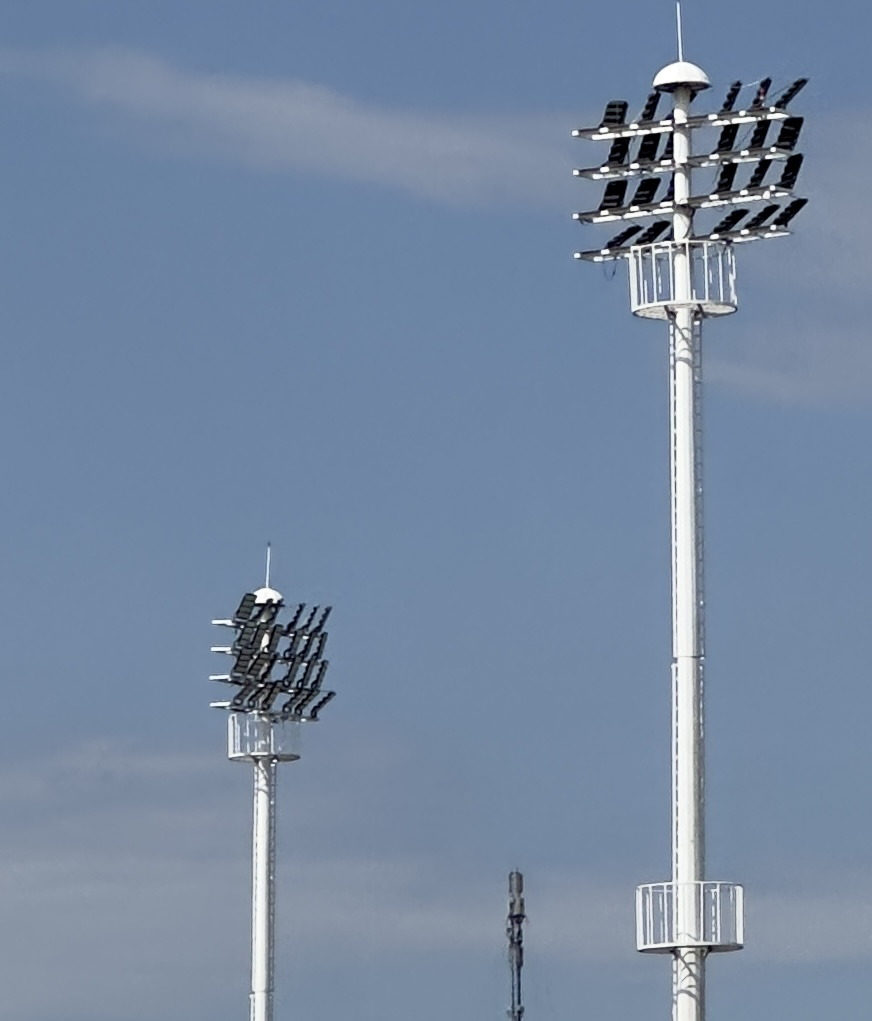
- Chamazi Stadium Lights
- Interactive map of Chamazi Stadium
- Former names: Azam Complex
- Location: Chamazi ward, Temeke, Dar es Salaam Region
- Coordinates: 6.97054°S 39.2234971°E
- Owner: Bakhresa Group
- Operator: Azam F.C.
- Capacity: 10,000

Tenant
- Azam F.C.

The Chamazi Stadium officially known as the Azam Complex Stadium (Kiwanja cha Michezo cha Chamazi, in Swahili) is a multi-use stadium in Chamazi ward of Temeke MC in Dar es Salaam, Tanzania. It is currently used mostly for football matches and is the home stadium of Azam FC. The stadium holds 10,000 people.

The ground has been recognized by the African football federation and it can used to play the international matches.This season the stadium has been the only stadium in Tanzania which met CAF standards, all international matches involving Tanzania clubs are played in this stadium.Also some teams from around east Africa have been using this stadium as their home ground.Dar es salaam Young Africans have been having five star performances in this stadium to the extent some fans are proposing the stadium to be renamed Yanga complex.

Azam FC drew an average home attendance of 2,358 in the 2023–24 Tanzanian Premier League.
