= South Sudan women's national football team results =

Women's national association football

This is an all-time list of the South Sudan women's national football team results.

== Results ==
Key
Win
Draw
Defeat

=== 2019 ===
16 November 2019 2019 CECAFA Women's Championship	Tanzania	9–0	South Sudan	Mbagala, Tanzania
14:30	Shurua 17', 41', 46'; Donisa Minja 32'; Stumai Abdallah 47', 50'; Julitha Tamuwahi 52'; Clement Sanga (?), 87'	Report		Stadium: Chamazi Stadium

18 November 2019 2019 CECAFA Women's Championship	South Sudan	5–0	Zanzibar	Mbagala, Tanzania
14:00	Amy Lasu 24', 82'; Suzy Iriamba 39'; Mwajuma 62' (o.g.); Manyol 77'			Stadium: Chamazi Stadium, Referee: Asnakech Gebre

20 November 2019 2019 CECAFA Women's Championship	South Sudan	0–3	Burundi	Mbagala, Tanzania
14:00			Annet Adebo Vita Nakirijja 10' (o.g.); Sakina Saidi 54' (pen.); Charlotte Irankunda 90+1'	Stadium: Chamazi Stadium,

=== 2021 ===
10 April 2021 Friendly	Ethiopia	11–0	South Sudan	Addis Ababa, Ethiopia
		Report (SW)		Stadium: Addis Ababa National Stadium

13 April 2021 Friendly	Ethiopia	3–0	South Sudan	Addis Ababa, Ethiopia
		Report (SW)		Stadium: Addis Ababa National Stadium

29 September COSAFA Women's Championship GS Group B	Botswana	7–0	South Sudan	Port Elizabeth, South Africa
	Tholakele 9', 30', 40'; Radiakanyo 15'; Thanda 24'; Johannes 39'; Montsho 87'	Report		Stadium: Wolfson Stadium

2 October COSAFA Women's Championship GS Group B	South Sudan	1–2	Zimbabwe	Port Elizabeth, South Africa
15:30	Riek 77'	Report (COSAFA); Report (SW)	Neshamba 12'; Nyaumwe 83'	Stadium: Gelvandale Stadium

4 October COSAFA Women's Championship GS Group B	Tanzania	3–0	South Sudan	Port Elizabeth, South Africa
15:30	S. Athuman 52', 80', 90+1'	Report		Stadium: Gelvandale Stadium; Referee: Chipo Mayimbo Mercy (Zimbabwe)

20 October 2022 AFWCON qualification first round 1st leg	Kenya	8–0	South Sudan	Nairobi, Kenya
15:00	Atieno 2', 3', 34', 57', 61'; Shikangwa 39', 72'; Adam 65'	Report		Stadium: Nyayo National Stadium; Referee: Salima Mukansanga (Rwanda)

23 October 2022 AFWCON qualification first round 2nd leg	South Sudan	1–7 (1–15 agg.)	Kenya	Nairobi, Kenya
13:00	Josephine 81'	Report	Adam 37' (pen.), 45'; Bundi 48'; Shikangwa 67', 73'; Akoth 88'; Atieno 90+3'	Stadium: Nyayo National Stadium
Note: Kenya won 15–1 on aggregate.

=== 2022 ===
16 February Friendly	Sudan	0–6	South Sudan	Khartoum, Sudan
15:15 UTC+2		Report	Deborah (??); chiang Tomas (??); Diana Padonyi (?? )	Stadium: Jebel Aulia Stadium

20 February Friendly	Sudan	0–3	South Sudan	Khartoum, Sudan
17:00 UTC+2		Report	Deborah (?? ): Sarah Aparo (?? ); chiang Tomas (?? )	Stadium: Jebel Aulia Stadium

2 June 2022 CECAFA Women's Championship GS Group B	Tanzania	2–0	South Sudan	Njeru, Uganda
16:00	Bilali 38'; Lucas 93'			Stadium: FUFA Technical Centre

4 June 2022 CECAFA Women's Championship GS Group B	South Sudan	1–0	Zanzibar	Njeru, Uganda
16:00	Deborah 80'			Stadium: FUFA Technical Centre

6 June 2022 CECAFA Women's Championship GS Group B	South Sudan	0–4	Ethiopia	Bugembe Stadium, Jinja
16:00			Tadesse 26', 65', 87'; Abera 27' (pen.)

=== 2023 ===
20 September 2023 2024 AFWCON qualification First round 1st leg	Egypt	4–0	South Sudan	Cairo, Egypt
18:00 UTC+3	S. Adam 4'; H. Maustafa 27'; O. Samir 38'; S. Essam 57'	Report (EFA)		Stadium: Petrosport Stadium; Referee: Dorsaf Ganouati (Tunisia)

24 September 2023 2024 AFWCON qualification First round 2nd leg	South Sudan	0–4 (0–8 agg.)	Egypt	Cairo, Egypt
18:00 UTC+3		Report (EFA)	S. Adam 17'; H. Maustafa 21'; S. Essam 33', 72'	Stadium: Al Salam Stadium
Note: Egypt won 8–0 on aggregate.

=== 2024 ===
29 May 2024 Friendly	Tanzania	3–0	South Sudan	Dar es Salaam, Tanzania
19:00 UTC+3	Clement 34'; Masaka 35', 54'			Stadium: Azam Complex Stadium

31 May 2024 Friendly	Seychelles	1–5	South Sudan	Dar es Salaam, Tanzania
16:00 UTC+3	Esther (??)		Malili (??); Bol Kuach (??); Deborah (??); Nyoka (??)	Stadium: Azam Complex Stadium

=== 2025 ===
13 June 2025 2025 CECAFA Championship	South Sudan	0–4	Tanzania	Chamazi, Tanzania
19:00		Report	Msewa 9'; Clement 35', 64'; Luvagna 69'	Stadium: Azam Complex Stadium; Referee: Joselyne Nsabimana (Burundi); Player of the Match: D. Msewa (Tanzania)

15 June 2025 2025 CECAFA Championship	South Sudan	0–5	Uganda	Chamazi, Tanzania
19:00		Report	Kabene 6', 22', 34'; Nalugya 9'; Namuleme 17' (pen.)	Stadium: Azam Complex Stadium; Referee: Tatu Malogo (Tanzania); Player of the Match: S. Kabene (Uganda)

19 June 2025 2025 CECAFA Championship	Kenya	4–0	South Sudan	Chamazi, Tanzania
16:00	Mboya 3'; Nanjala 47'; Amunyolet 66'; Ochaka 90+5'	Report		Stadium: Azam Complex Stadium; Referee: Joselyne Nsabimana (Burundi)

21 June 2025 2025 CECAFA Championship	Burundi	1–3	South Sudan	Chamazi, Tanzania
14:00	Bizimana 67' (pen.)	Report	Anger Bol 38'; Malili 72'; Makuach 90+1'	Stadium: Azam Complex Stadium; Referee: Tatu Malogo (Tanzania); Player of the Match: Ludia Maika (South Sudan)
