= 2025 CECAFA Women's Championship squads =

The 2025 CECAFA Women's Championship is the upcoming international women's association football tournament to be held in Dar es Salaam, Tanzania from 12 to 22 June 2025. Each of the five national teams participating in the tournament was required to submit a squad of at least 20 players, including two goalkeepers. Only players included in these squads were eligible to take part in the tournament. In the event of a serious injury or illness prior to a team’s first match, a player could be replaced.

The age listed for each player is their age as of 12 June 2025, the first day of the tournament. The club listed is the club for which the player last played a competitive match prior to the tournament. The nationality for each club reflects the national association (not the league) to which the club is affiliated. A flag is included for coaches who are of a different nationality to their team.

== Squads ==
=== Tanzania ===
A 30-player squad was announced on 10 May 2025 for a WAFCON preparation camp and two friendly matches against DR Congo. The final list was later trimmed to a 20-player squad for the CECAFA Championship in June 2025.

Head coach: Bakari Shime

No.	Pos.	Player	Date of birth (age)	Club
1	GK	Najiati Idrisa	2 April 1997 (aged 28)	(Tanzania) JKT Queens
20	GK	Asha Mrisho	10 February 2004 (aged 21)	(Tanzania) Mashukaa Queens
2	DF	Anastazia Katunzi	29 January 1996 (aged 29)	(Tanzania) JKT Queens
4	DF	Vioeth Mwamakamba	9 February 2005 (aged 20)	(Tanzania) Simba Queens
5	DF	Fatuma Issa	9 April 1995 (aged 30)	(Tanzania) Simba Queens
13	DF	Asha Ramadhani	5 May 2009 (aged 16)	(Tanzania) Yanga Princess
15	DF	Lidya Kabambo	27 November 2008 (aged 16)	(Tanzania) JKT Queens
16	DF	Ester Marwa	3 June 2008 (aged 17)	(Tanzania) Bunda Queens
17	DF	Christer Bahera	17 November 2005 (aged 19)	(Tanzania) JKT Queens
18	DF	Maimuna Kaimu	28 August 1997 (aged 27)	(Egypt) ZED FC
3	MF	Hasnath Ubamba	8 July 2006 (aged 18)	(Egypt) FC Masar
6	MF	Donisia Minja	9 August 1996 (aged 28)	(Tanzania) JKT Queens
11	MF	Diana Msewa	13 November 2001 (aged 23)	(Turkey) Trabzonspor
12	MF	Janeth Pangamwene	27 November 2000 (aged 24)	(Tanzania) JKT Queens
19	MF	Winfrida Gerald	26 August 2008 (aged 16)	(Tanzania) JKT Queens
7	FW	Opah Clement (Captain)	14 February 2001 (aged 24)	(Mexico) Juárez
8	FW	Stumai Athumani	25 August 1997 (aged 27)	(Tanzania) JKT Queens
9	FW	Aisha Mnunka	26 July 2005 (aged 19)	(Tanzania) Simba Queens
10	FW	Jamila Mnunduka	10 November 2007 (aged 17)	(Tanzania) JKT Queens
14	FW	Clara Luvanga	25 February 2005 (aged 20)	(Saudi Arabia) Al Nassr

=== Uganda ===
The 20-woman final squad was announced on 7 June 2025. On 10 June 2025, Ruth Aturo and Zidah Asiimwe were called up to replace Nulu Nakyaze Babirye and Resty Kobusobozi, respectively.

Head coach: (South Africa) Sheryl Botes

No.	Pos.	Player	Date of birth (age)	Club
1	GK	Ruth Aturo	19 July 1995 (aged 29)	(Tanzania) Tausi
18	GK	Lillian Nakiirya	7 September 2007 (aged 17)	(Uganda) St. Noa Girls
19	GK	Daisy Nakaziro	22 September 1997 (aged 27)	(Uganda) Kampala Queens
2	DF	Esther Namusoke	4 May 2005 (aged 20)	(Uganda) Kampala Queens
3	DF	Jolly Kobusinge	25 July 2001 (aged 23)	(Uganda) Kawempe Muslim Ladies
4	DF	Hasifah Patricia Namboozo	1 January 2006 (aged 19)	(Uganda) Makerere University
5	DF	Desire Katisi Natooro	15 October 2007 (aged 17)	(Uganda) Asubo Ladies
14	DF	Docas Lwalisa	18 January 2003 (aged 22)	(Uganda) Olila HS
15	DF	Jamilah Nabulime	8 August 1999 (aged 25)	(Uganda) Kampala Queens
20	DF	Zainah Nandede	15 October 2003 (aged 21)	(Uganda) Kampala Queens
6	MF	Zaina Namuleme (Captain)	9 January 2000 (aged 25)	(Uganda) Makerere University
7	MF	Margaret Kunihira	9 September 2004 (aged 20)	(Tanzania) Ceasiaa Queens
8	FW	Zidah Asiimwe	15 September 2008 (aged 16)	(Uganda) Boni Consilii Girls
10	MF	Shamirah Nalugya	12 September 2003 (aged 21)	(Uganda) Kampala Queens
12	MF	Sumayah Nabuto	17 January 2004 (aged 21)	(Uganda) Kawempe Muslim Ladies
13	MF	Brenda Munyana	26 November 2005 (aged 19)	Uganda Martyrs Lubaga
16	MF	Shakirah Nankwanga	15 July 2002 (aged 22)	(Uganda) Kampala Queens
9	FW	Jovia Nakagolo	23 July 2005 (aged 19)	(Uganda) Kawempe Muslim Ladies
11	FW	Sylvia Kabene	3 May 2007 (aged 18)	(Uganda) St. Noa Girls
17	FW	Latifah Nakasi	3 May 2003 (aged 22)	Uganda Martyrs Lubaga

=== Burundi ===
The 20-woman final squad was announced on 9 June 2025.

Head coach: Olivier Niyungeko

No.	Pos.	Player	Date of birth (age)	Club
1	GK	Faida Habimana	24 March 2005 (aged 20)	(Burundi) Buja Queens
13	GK	Médiatrice Nsabimana	5 July 2010 (aged 14)	(Burundi) Arena Star
	GK	Solange Manirakiza		(Burundi) La Colombe
2	DF	Zena Shabani Nahimana	10 October 2007 (aged 17)	(Burundi) Top Girls Academy
9	DF	Dorine Irankunda	13 October 2009 (aged 15)	(Burundi) Maika
11	DF	Channy Nsabiyuva	7 June 2005 (aged 20)	(Burundi) Top Girls Academy
12	DF	Angélique Keza	1 August 2004 (aged 20)	(Rwanda) Rayon Sports
17	DF	Esperance Habonimana	12 April 2007 (aged 18)	(Rwanda) Police
19	DF	Evelyne Akimana	1 September 2006 (aged 18)	(Burundi) La Colombe
20	DF	Annociate Nshimirimana	2 October 2004 (aged 20)	(Tanzania) Fountain Gate Princess
4	MF	Estelle Gakima	21 November 2005 (aged 19)	(Burundi) La Colombe
6	MF	Peace Olga Niyomwungere (Captain)	20 December 2005 (aged 19)	(Rwanda) Rayon Sports
16	MF	Grâce Niyonkuru	1 January 1999 (aged 26)	(Burundi) Kazoza Keza
18	MF	Joëlle Bukuru	13 February 1999 (aged 26)	(Tanzania) Fountain Gate Princess
5	FW	Gloris Gakiza	25 November 2007 (aged 17)	(Burundi) Buja Queens
7	FW	Aniella Uwimana	17 November 1999 (aged 25)	(Saudi Arabia) Jeddah
8	FW	Erica Kanyamuneza	11 August 2001 (aged 23)	(Rwanda) Police
10	FW	Rukiya Bizimana	23 March 2006 (aged 19)	(Rwanda) Rayon Sports
14	FW	Adolphine Salum Rumuri	31 December 2007 (aged 17)	(Rwanda) Bugesera FC
15	FW	Aline Hakizimana	13 June 2010 (aged 14)	(Burundi) Intwarikazi
	FW	Rahay-Roy Nzoyikorera		(Burundi) Top Girls Academy

=== South Sudan ===
A 30-player provisional squad was announced on 5 June 2025. The final 20-woman squad was announced by CECAFA on 12 June 2025.

Head coach: Simon James Yor Kak

No.	Pos.	Player	Date of birth (age)	Club
1	GK	Nawal Isaac	2 March 2005 (aged 20)	(South Sudan) Yei Joint Stars
6	GK	Ayiet Kur Ajing		(South Sudan)
16	GK	Margaret Mande	3 August 2008 (aged 16)	(South Sudan) Munuki
5	DF	Awut Madout	5 May 2009 (aged 16)	(South Sudan) Wajuma
12	DF	Sumaya Malili	27 December 2003 (aged 21)	(South Sudan) Yei Joint Stars
15	DF	Paska John	20 April 2007 (aged 18)	(South Sudan) Munuki
17	DF	Amama Issa	11 July 1998 (aged 26)	(South Sudan) Munuki
20	DF	Modong Jeska	2 February 1997 (aged 28)	(South Sudan) Yei Joint Stars
3	MF	Diana Padonyi	15 December 2004 (aged 20)	(South Sudan) Munuki
4	MF	Ambayo Immaculate	10 May 2008 (aged 17)	(South Sudan) Yei Joint Stars
10	MF	Monica Nakamu (Captain)	13 August 2008 (aged 16)	(South Sudan) Munuki
11	MF	Amuna Kenneth	6 June 2008 (aged 17)	(South Sudan) Munuki
13	MF	Adong Juan	3 March 2007 (aged 18)	(South Sudan) Simba FC
19	MF	Poni Esther Wani	14 April 2002 (aged 23)	(South Sudan) Yei Joint Stars
7	FW	Kayungu Vivian Iga	27 September 2009 (aged 15)	Free agent
8	FW	Anyiet Wek Maduok	24 February 2006 (aged 19)	(South Sudan) Wajuma
9	FW	Nyamam Makuach	5 October 2008 (aged 16)	(South Sudan) Munuki
14	FW	Mary Anger Bol	27 January 2001 (aged 24)	(South Sudan) Yei Joint Stars
18	FW	Ludia Maika	6 January 2009 (aged 16)	(South Sudan) Munuki
	FW	Debora Luka	30 January 2003 (aged 22)	(Albania) FK Apolonia Fier

=== Kenya ===
The 23-woman final squad was announced on 10 June 2025. Vivian Shiyonzo, Corazone Aquino and Elizabeth Wambui were all named in Kenya's final 23-player squad, but were not included in the official 20-player list published by CECAFA on 12 June 2025.

Head coach: Beldine Odemba

No.	Pos.	Player	Date of birth (age)	Club
1	GK	Lilian Awuor	13 June 1999 (aged 25)	(Romania) FCV Farul Constanța
18	GK	Annedy Kundu	17 September 1996 (aged 28)	Kenya Police Bullets
2	DF	Janet Mumo	28 May 2002 (aged 23)	(Kenya) Kibera Soccer
3	DF	Vivian Nasaka (Captain)	19 December 1999 (aged 25)	(Turkey) Hakkarigücü Spor
5	DF	Dorcas Shikobe	4 April 1989 (aged 36)	(Greece) Seirines Grevenon
11	DF	Tabitha Amoit	5 April 2004 (aged 21)	(Kenya) Ulinzi Starlets
13	DF	Alice Mideri	2 July 1996 (aged 28)	(Kenya) Vihiga Queens
15	DF	Elizabeth Ochaka	9 June 2009 (aged 16)	Kenya Police Bullets
16	DF	Enez Mango	1 July 1993 (aged 31)	(Romania) FCV Farul Constanța
20	DF	Ruth Ingosi	19 December 1993 (aged 31)	(Tanzania) Simba Queens
4	MF	Diana Wacera	6 July 1998 (aged 26)	Kenya Police Bullets
6	MF	Medina Abubakar	7 March 2003 (aged 22)	(Kenya) Kibera Soccer
7	MF	Lavender Akinyi	15 May 2003 (aged 22)	(Kenya) Ulinzi Starlets
12	MF	Martha Amunyolet	5 January 2000 (aged 25)	(Kenya) Vihiga Queens
17	MF	Fasila Adhiambo	6 January 2006 (aged 19)	(Kenya) Ulinzi Starlets
8	FW	Faith Mboya	10 September 2004 (aged 20)	(Kenya) Kibera Soccer
9	FW	Tumaini Waliaula	5 June 1999 (aged 26)	(Greece) Seirines Grevenon
10	FW	Swaum Nanjala	20 April 2004 (aged 21)	(Kenya) Vihiga Queens
14	FW	Emily Morang'a	22 February 2006 (aged 19)	Kenya Police Bullets
19	FW	Violet Nanjala	20 January 2000 (aged 25)	(Morocco) AM Laâyoune
