= 2025 CECAFA Women's Championship =

CECAFA Women's C'ship 2025
Mashindano ya CECAFA kwa Wanawake 2025

Tournament details
- Host country: Tanzania
- City: Dar es Salaam
- Dates: 13–21 June
- Teams: 5 (from 1 sub-confederation)
- Venue: 1 (in 1 host city)

Final positions
- Champions: Tanzania (3rd title)
- Runners-up: Kenya
- Third place: Uganda
- Fourth place: Burundi

Tournament statistics
- Matches played: 10
- Goals scored: 34 (3.4 per match)
- Top scorer(s): (Tanzania) Opah Clement (5 goals)
- Best player: (Tanzania) Diana Msewa
- Best goalkeeper: (Tanzania) Najiati Idrissa

The 2025 CECAFA Women's Championship (Swahili: Mashindano ya CECAFA kwa Wanawake 2025) was the sixth edition of the CECAFA Women's Championship and the fifth to be held since the tournament's Reintroduction in 2016. It was an international women's football tournament contested by the women's national association football teams of East Africa, organized by the Council for East and Central Africa Football Associations (CECAFA). Tanzania hosted the tournament from 13 to 21 June 2025.

Uganda were the defending champions, having won their first title on home soil in the last edition. However, they were unable to defend their title, winning only one of their four matches, which stood as their worst performance in the competition to date. In contrast, hosts and most successful side Tanzania secured their third title, defeating Kenya 1–0 on the final matchday. Twiga Stars's captain Opah Clement won the Golden Boot for the second consecutive time, netting five goals during the competition.

== Teams ==
=== Participating teams ===
On 2 June 2025, CECAFA confirmed the participation of 4 of its member associations, with more teams expected to confirm in the coming days. On 5 June, it was confirmed that five (of 11 teams) would take part in the final tournament.

Note: All appearance statistics exclude the 1986 edition.

Team	App.	Previous best performance	WR (Note: As of the latest FIFA Women's World Ranking, published on 6 March 2025.)
Burundi	4th	Runners-up (2022)	178
Kenya	4th	Champions (2019)	142
South Sudan	3rd	Group stage (2019, 2022)	193
Tanzania	5th	Champions (2016, 2018)	138
Uganda	5th	Champions (2022)	148

Did not enter

- Djibouti (195)
- Eritrea (NR)
- Ethiopia (128)
- Rwanda (165)
- Sudan (NR)
- Zanzibar

=== Squads ===
Each national team had to submit a squad of 20 players, two of whom must be goalkeepers by the deadline.

== Match officials ==
CECAFA appointed 6 referees, 5 assistant referees for the tournament.

=== Referees ===
- (Burundi) Joselyne Nsabimana
- (Kenya) Lucy Juma
- (South Sudan) Emmanuela Akoo
- (South Sudan) Stella Sebit
- (Tanzania) Tatu Malogo
- (Uganda) Diana Murungi

=== Assistant referees ===
- (Burundi) Anitha Niyokindi
- (Kenya) Elizabeth Njoroge
- (Tanzania) Glory Tesha
- (Tanzania) Zawadi Hashim
- (Uganda) Immaculate Ongiera

== Main tournament ==
The official match schedule was confirmed by CECAFA on 5 June 2025. A slight adjustment was made after South Sudan's late arrival due to logistical challenges, with the first two matchdays, originally set for 12 and 14 June, rescheduled to 13 and 15 June.

All times are local, EAT (UTC+3).

=== Standings ===
Pos	Team	Pld	W	D	L	GF	GA	GD	Pts
1st place, gold medalist(s)	Tanzania	4	4	0	0	13	0	+13	12
2nd place, silver medalist(s)	Kenya	4	3	0	1	11	1	+10	9
3rd place, bronze medalist(s)	Uganda	4	1	0	3	5	7	−2	3
4	Burundi	4	1	0	3	2	12	−10	3
5	South Sudan	4	1	0	3	3	14	−11	3

Source: CECAFA
Rules for classification: Tiebreakers

=== Matches ===
13 June 2025
16:00

Uganda	0–1	Burundi
	Report; Report (CECAFA)	Habonimana 76'

Azam Complex Stadium, Chamazi
Referee: Lucy Juma (Kenya)
13 June 2025
19:00

South Sudan	0–4	Tanzania
	Report; Report (CECAFA)	Msewa 9'; Clement 35', 64'; Luvanga 69'

Azam Complex Stadium, Chamazi
Referee: Joselyne Nsabimana (Burundi)

15 June 2025
16:00

Burundi	0–3	Kenya
	Report; Report (CECAFA)	Amunyolet 2', 5'; Mboya 90+1'

Azam Complex Stadium, Chamazi
Referee: Emmanuela Akoo (South Sudan)
15 June 2025
19:00

South Sudan	0–5	Uganda
	Report; Report (CECAFA)	Kabene 6', 22', 34'; Nalugya 9'; Namuleme 17' (pen.)

Azam Complex Stadium, Chamazi
Referee: Tatu Malogo (Tanzania)

17 June 2025
16:00

Tanzania	6–0	Burundi
Clement 8', 31'; Mnunduka 65'; Luvanga 70'; Msewa 73'; Athumani 79'	Report; Report (CECAFA)

Azam Complex Stadium, Chamazi
Referee: Diana Murungi (Uganda)
17 June 2025
19:00

Kenya	4–0	Uganda
Wacera 18'; Shikobe 27'; Nanjala 28'; Amunyolet 81'	Report; Report (CECAFA)

Azam Complex Stadium, Chamazi
Referee: Tatu Malogo (Tanzania)

19 June 2025
16:00

Kenya	4–0	South Sudan
Mboya 3'; Nanjala 47'; Amunyolet 66'; Ochaka 90+5'	Report; Report (CECAFA)

Azam Complex Stadium, Chamazi
Referee: Joselyne Nsabimana (Burundi)
19 June 2025
19:00

Uganda	0–2	Tanzania
	Report; Report (CECAFA)	Clement 21'; Msewa 83'

Azam Complex Stadium, Chamazi
Referee: Lucy Juma (Kenya)

21 June 2025
14:00

Burundi	1–3	South Sudan
Bizimana 67' (pen.)	Report; Report (CECAFA)	Anger Bol 38'; Malili 72'; Makuach 90+1'

Azam Complex Stadium, Chamazi
Referee: Tatu Malogo (Tanzania)
21 June 2025
18:00

Tanzania	1–0	Kenya
Mango 49' (o.g.)	Report; Report (CECAFA)

Azam Complex Stadium, Chamazi
Referee: Diana Murungi (Uganda)

== Goalscorers ==
There were 34 goals scored in 10 matches, for an average of 3.4 goals per match.

5 goals

- (Tanzania) Opah Clement

4 goals

- (Kenya) Martha Amunyolet

3 goals

- (Tanzania) Diana Msewa
- (Uganda) Sylvia Kabene

2 goals

- (Kenya) Faith Mboya
- (Kenya) Violet Nanjala
- (Tanzania) Clara Luvanga

1 goal

- (Burundi) Rukiya Bizimana
- (Burundi) Espérance Habonimana
- (Kenya) Elizabeth Ochaka
- (Kenya) Dorcas Shikobe
- (Kenya) Diana Wacera
- (South Sudan) Mary Anger Bol
- (South Sudan) Nyamam Makuach
- (South Sudan) Sumaya Malili
- (Tanzania) Stumai Athumani
- (Tanzania) Jamila Mnunduka
- (Uganda) Shamirah Nalugya
- (Uganda) Zaina Namuleme

1 own goal

- (Kenya) Enez Mango (against Tanzania)

== See also ==
- 2025 WAFU Zone A Women's Cup
- 2025 WAFU Zone B Women's Cup
- 2024 Women's Africa Cup of Nations
