= 2021 CECAFA Women's Championship =

Tournament details
- Host country: Djibouti
- Dates: 17–31 December 2021
- Teams: 8

The 2021 CECAFA Women's Championship was set to be the 5th edition of the biennial association football tournament for women's national teams in the East Africa region organized by CECAFA. It was set to held in Djibouti City, Djibouti 17 to 31 December 2021. but was cancelled after the Djiboutian Football Federation withdrew from hosting the tournament due to ongoing work of the El Hadj Hassan Gouled Aptidon Stadium.

Kenya are the defending champion by having defeated Tanzania 2–0 goals on 25 November 2019 in the previous edition final.

== Participants ==
The following eight teams were set to contest in the tournament.

Team	Appearances	Previous best performance
Burundi	5th	Semi-finals (2019)
Djibouti	4th	Group stage (1986, 2016, 2019)
Ethiopia	5th	3rd place (2016, 2018)
Kenya	5th	Champions (2019)
South Sudan	5th	Third place (1983)
Tanzania	5th	Champions (2016, 2018)
Uganda	5th	Third place (2019)
Zanzibar	5th	Champions (1986)

== Venue ==
The tournament was scheduled to take place in the El Hadj Hassan Gouled Aptidon Stadium in Djibouti City, but was cancelled due to reconstruction of the stadium.
