= Zaina Namuleme =

Ugandan footballer

Personal information
- Full name: Zaina Namuleme
- Date of birth: 9 January 2000 (age 26)
- Position: Midfielder

Team information
- Current team: URA Women FC
- Number: 13

Youth career
- 2013–2016: Gadhafi Integrated Academy

Senior career*
Years	Team	Apps	(Gls)
2016–2024	Kampala Queens		
2024–2025	Makerere University		
2025-2026	Kenya Police Bullets		
2026	Rayon Sport Women FC		
2026-date	URA Women FC		

International career
2020	Uganda U20	2	(0)
2016–	Uganda	+4	(2)
- * Club domestic league appearances and goals

Zaina Namuleme (born 9 January 2000) is a Ugandan professional footballer who plays as a midfielder for Uganda Revenue Authority Women Football Club. She is the current captain of the Uganda Revenue Authority Women football club and Uganda women's national team since June 2025.

== Club career ==
Namuleme began her football career with Gadhafi Integrated Academy in 2013, remaining with the team until 2016, when it transitioned into Kampala Queens. In May 2022, she transitioned from a striker to a midfield role.

In April 2024, Namuleme stepped down as Kampala Queens captain after serving for two and a half seasons. In July 2024, Kampala Queens announced the departure of the midfielder, who had been with the club since its inception eight years prior. She joined Makerere University Women Football Club, where she made became the first player to score a super hat-trick in the 2024–25 FUFA Women Super League season. She later later signed for Kenya Police Bullets in July, 2024. After one year with the club, Namuleme joined Rwanda's Women team Rayon Sport Women FC in July, 2026 ahead of their preparation for the CAF Women's Champions League CECAFA Zonal Qualifiers on two years contract. Two months later, she parted ways with the club to return to uganda.

In September 2026, Namuleme left Rayon Sport Women FC for Uganda Revenue Authority Women Football Club on a two years working contract.

== International career ==
Namuleme represented Uganda at the under-20 level, featuring in the 2020 African U-20 Women's World Cup qualifiers against Tanzania.

In June 2016, Namuleme received her first call-up to the senior national team for a friendly match against Kenya. She was part of the final squad for the 2016 CECAFA Women's Championship. She also participated in the 2018 and 2019 CECAFA Women's Championship editions.

On 21 February 2025, she scored her first international goal in stoppage time in a 2–0 victory for Uganda. In June 2025, ahead of her fourth appearance at the CECAFA Women's Championship, Namuleme was appointed captain of the Crested Cranes to lead the team throughout the 2025 edition.

=== International goals ===
Scores and results list Uganda's goal tally first, score column indicates score after each Namuleme goal.

No.	Date	Venue	Opponent	Score	Match result	Competition
1	21 February 2025	Nakivubo Stadium, Kampala, Uganda	Ethiopia	1–0	2–0	2026 WAFCON qualifying
2	15 June 2025	Chamazi Stadium, Chamazi, Tanzania	South Sudan	3–0	3–0	2025 CECAFA Women's Championship
