= Uganda women's national football team =

Women's association football team

Uganda
- Nickname: The Crested Cranes
- Association: Federation of Uganda Football Associations (FUFA)
- Confederation: CAF (Africa)
- Sub-confederation: CECAFA (East & Central Africa)
- Head coach: Sheryl Botes Ulanda
- Captain: Zaina Namuleme
- Top scorer: Fazila Ikwaput (20)
- Home stadium: Mandela National Stadium and others (Note: The Uganda women's team uses a variety of venues around the country, in part to promote women's football. As of June 2025 they had played home games at 7 different grounds. Mandela is typically used for games of major importance.)
- FIFA code: UGA
First colours	Second colours

FIFA ranking
- Current: 145 (16 June 2026)
- Highest: 111 (December 2017)
- Lowest: 161 (October – December 2022; June 2023)

First international
- Egypt 1–1 Uganda (Egypt, 29 March 1998)

Biggest win
- Uganda 13–0 Djibouti (17 November 2019)

Biggest defeat
- DR Congo 4–0 Uganda (Kinshasa, DR Congo; 28 January 2012); Kenya 4–0 Uganda (Kisumu, Kenya; 3 July 2016); Uganda 0–4 Kenya (Jinja, Uganda; 11 September 2016); Kenya 4–0 Uganda (Chamazi, Tanzania; 17 June 2025)

World Cup
- Appearances: 0

Olympic Games
- Appearances: 0

African Women's Championship
- Appearances: 2 (first in 2000)
- Best result: Group stage (2000, 2022)

The Uganda women's national football team also known as The Crested Cranes is the national women's football team of Uganda. It is controlled by the Federation of Uganda Football Associations.

== History ==
FUFA President Lawrence Mulindwa addressed this in 2007, saying, "We had a girls' tournament in Luweero earlier this year and top players are going to be assembled into a national team to contest at the inaugural CECAFA Women's Challenge Cup to be held in Zanzibar in October." The tournament though was never played.

== Team image ==
=== Nicknames ===
The Uganda women's national football team has been known or nicknamed as the "Crested Cranes".

== Results and fixtures ==
The following is a list of match results in the last 12 months, as well as any future matches that have been scheduled.

Legend

Win Draw Lose Fixture

== Coaching staff ==
=== Current coaching staff ===
update :November 2023

Position	Name	Ref.
Head coach	(South Africa) Sheryl Botes	
Assistant coach	Charles Ayiekoh Lukula	
Goalkeeping coach	David Ribeiro; George Ssebuliba	

=== Manager history ===
- (Uganda) Faridah Bulega (2017–2022)
- (Uganda) George Lutalo (2022–2023)
- (Uganda) Ayub Khalifah Klyingl (2023)
- (South Africa) Sheryl Botes Ulanda (2023-)

== Players ==
=== Current squad ===
The following is the final squad for 2025 CECAFA Women's Championship, announced on 7 June 2025. On 10 June 2025, Ruth Aturo and Zidah Asiimwe were called up to replace Nulu Nakyaze Babirye and Resty Kobusobozi, respectively.

No.	Pos.	Player	Date of birth (age)	Club
1	GK	Ruth Aturo	19 July 1995 (age 31)	(Tanzania Football Federation) Ukerewe Queens SC
19	GK	Daisy Nakaziro	22 September 1997 (age 29)	(Federation of Uganda Football Associations) Kampala Queens
18	GK	Lillian Nakiirya	7 September 2007 (age 19)	(Federation of Uganda Football Associations) St. Noa Girls
2	DF	Esther Namusoke	4 May 2005 (age 21)	(Federation of Uganda Football Associations) Kampala Queens
15	DF	Jolly Kobusinge	25 July 2001 (age 25)	(Federation of Uganda Football Associations) Kawempe Muslim Ladies
4	DF	Hasifah Patricia Namboozo	1 January 2006 (age 20)	(Federation of Uganda Football Associations) Makerere University
5	DF	Desire Katisi Natooro	15 October 2007 (age 19)	(Federation of Uganda Football Associations) Asubo Ladies
20	DF	Zainah Nandede	15 October 2003 (age 23)	(Federation of Uganda Football Associations) Kampala Queens
14	DF	Docas Lwalisa	18 January 2003 (age 23)	(Federation of Uganda Football Associations) Olila HS
15	DF	Jamilah Nabulime	8 August 1999 (age 27)	(Federation of Uganda Football Associations) Kampala Queens
6	MF	Zaina Namuleme (Captain)	9 January 2000 (age 26)	(Federation of Uganda Football Associations) Makerere University
7	MF	Margret Kunihira	9 September 2004 (age 22)	(Tanzania Football Federation) Ceasiaa Queens
8	FW	Zidah Asiimwe	15 September 2008 (age 18)	(Federation of Uganda Football Associations) Boni Consilii Girls
–	MF	Shamirah Nalugya	12 September 2003 (age 23)	(Federation of Uganda Football Associations) Kampala Queens FC
12	MF	Sumayah Nabuto	17 January 2004 (age 22)	(Federation of Uganda Football Associations) Kawempe Muslim Ladies
13	MF	Brenda Munyana	26 November 2005 (age 20)	(Federation of Uganda Football Associations) Uganda Martyrs Lubaga
16	MF	Shakirah Nankwanga	15 July 2002 (age 24)	(Federation of Uganda Football Associations) Kampala Queens
9	FW	Jovia Nakagolo	23 July 2005 (age 21)	(Federation of Uganda Football Associations) Kawempe Muslim Ladies
11	FW	Sylvia Kabene	3 May 2007 (age 19)	(Federation of Uganda Football Associations) St. Noa Girls
17	FW	Latifah Nakasi	3 May 2003 (age 23)	(Federation of Uganda Football Associations) Uganda Martyrs Lubaga

=== Recent call-ups ===
The following players have been called up to a Uganda squad in the past 12 months.

Pos.	Player	Date of birth (age)	Caps	Goals	Club	Latest call-up
^{INJ} Player withdrew from the squad due to an injury.^{PRE} Preliminary squad.^{SUS} Player is serving a suspension.^{WD} Player withdrew for personal reasons.

=== Previous squads ===
Africa Women Cup of Nations

- 2000 African Women's Championship squad
- 2022 Women's Africa Cup of Nations squads

CECAFA Women's Championship

- 2022 CECAFA Women's Championship squads
- 2025 CECAFA Women's Championship squads

== Records ==
As of 1 July 2021
Players in bold are still active, at least at club level.

=== Most capped players ===
#	Player	Year(s)	Caps

=== Top goalscorers ===
#	Player	Year(s)	Goals	Caps

== Competitive record ==
=== FIFA Women's World Cup ===
FIFA Women's World Cup record
Year	Result	Pld	W	D*	L	GS	GA	GD
(China) 1991	did not enter							
(Sweden) 1995	did not qualify							
(United States) 1999	did not qualify							
(United States) 2003	did not qualify							
(China) 2007	did not qualify							
(Germany) 2011	did not qualify							
(Canada) 2015	did not qualify							
(France) 2019	did not qualify							
(Australia) (New Zealand) 2023	did not qualify							
(Brazil) 2027	to be determined							
Total	0/10	0	0	0	0	0	0	0

*Draws include knockout matches decided on penalty kicks.

=== Olympic Games ===
Summer Olympics record
Year	Result	Pld	W	D*	L	GS	GA	GD
(United States) 1996	did not qualify							
(Australia) 2000	did not qualify							
(Greece) 2004	did not qualify							
(China) 2008	did not qualify							
(United Kingdom) 2012	did not qualify							
(Brazil) 2016	did not qualify							
(Japan) 2020	did not qualify							
(France) 2024	did not qualify							
(United States) 2028	did not qualify							
Total	0/9	0	0	0	0	0	0	0

*Draws include knockout matches decided on penalty kicks.

=== Africa Women Cup of Nations ===
Africa Women Cup of Nations record
Year	Round	Pld	W	D*	L	GS	GA	GD
1991	did not qualify							
1995	did not qualify							
(Nigeria) 1998	did not qualify							
(South Africa) 2000	Group stage	3	1	1	1	4	6	−2
(Nigeria) 2002	Did not qualify							
(South Africa) 2004	Did not qualify							
(Nigeria) 2006	Did not qualify							
(Equatorial Guinea) 2008	Did not qualify							
(South Africa) 2010	Did not qualify							
(Equatorial Guinea) 2012	Did not qualify							
(Namibia) 2014	Did not qualify							
(Cameroon) 2016	Did not qualify							
(Ghana) 2018	Did not qualify							
(Republic of the Congo) 2020	Cancelled							
(Morocco) 2022	Group stage	3	0	1	2	3	7	−4
(Morocco) 2024	Did not qualify							
(Morocco) 2026	Did not qualify							
Total	Group stage	6	1	2	3	7	13	−6

*Draws include knockout matches decided on penalty kicks.

=== African Games ===
African Games record
Year	Result	Matches	Wins	Draws	Losses	GF	GA
(Nigeria) 2003	Did not enter						
(Algeria) 2007	Did not enter						
(Mozambique) 2011	Did not qualify						
(Republic of the Congo) 2015	Did not enter						
(Morocco) 2019	Did not qualify						
(Ghana) 2023	**Third place**	5	1	3	1	4	4
Total	1/5	5	1	3	1	4	4

=== CECAFA Women's Championship ===
CECAFA Women's Championship
Year	Round	GP	W	D*	L	GS	GA	GD
(Zanzibar) 1986
(Uganda) 2016	**4th**	5	2	0	3	12	12	0
(Rwanda) 2018	**runner up**	4	2	1	1	6	7	−1
(Tanzania) 2019	**3rd**	5	3	0	2	16	4	+12
(Djibouti) 2021	Cancelled							
(Uganda) 2022	**Winner**	5	5	0	0	15	2	+13
(Tanzania) 2025	**3rd**	4	1	0	3	5	7	-2
**Total**	4/6	23	13	1	9	54	32	22

== Honours ==
=== Regional ===
- **CECAFA Women's Championship**

Champions: 2022

== All−time record against FIFA recognized nations ==
The list shown below shows the Djibouti national football team all−time international record against opposing nations.
*As of xxxxxx after match against xxxx.

Key

Positive balance (more wins than losses)
Neutral balance (as many wins as losses)
Negative balance (more losses than wins)

Against	Pld	W	D	L	GF	GA	GD	Confederation

=== Record per opponent ===
*As ofxxxxx after match against xxxxx.

Key

Positive balance (more wins than losses)
Neutral balance (as many wins as losses)
Negative balance (more losses than wins)

The following table shows Djibouti's all-time official international record per opponent:

Opponent	Pld	W	D	L	GF	GA	GD	W%	Confederation
Total									—

== See also ==
- Sport in Uganda
  - Football in Uganda
    - Women's football in Uganda
- Uganda women's national under-20 football team
- Uganda women's national under-17 football team
- Uganda men's national football team
