= Faridah Bulega =

Ugandan football coach

Personal information
- Place of birth: Uganda
- Position

Senior career*
Years	Team	Apps	(Gls)
- Kampala Queens WFC
- Wakiso United

International career
- Uganda women's national football team (Crested Cranes)
- * Club domestic league appearances and goals

Faridah Bulega is a Ugandan football coach who served as the coach for the Crested Cranes women's team in Uganda. Previously, Madijah Nantanda was the national women's team coach at Crested Cranes. George Lutalo took over from Bulega as the new Crested Cranes head coach.

== Career history ==
While as the coach for the Crested Cranes, she appointed Ayub Khalifan as a second assistant coach on the technical bench during the Cecafa Women's Championship. Khalifan won four Fufa Women's Elite League titles with Kawempe Muslim and the Cosafa U17 Women's Championship in Mauritius. She enrolled in and completed the CAF B Coaching Course in Kenya. She was head coach at Kampala Queens Women Football Club. She also coached Wakiso United.

== See also ==
- Uganda women's national football team
- CECAFA Women's Challenge Cup
- Federation of Uganda Football Associations
- Uganda national football team
