= Tanzanite University =

Tanzanian university

- Type: Private
- Location: Chamazi, Tanzania
- Website: University website

Tanzanite University(TC) is a private university in Chamanzi, Tanzania.
