= Women's football in Somalia =

Football is the most popular sport for women in Somalia. However, Somalia does not have a women's national football team with FIFA recognition, and have never played in a single international fixture. They are in a region that faces many challenges for the development of women's sport. Football is the most popular women's sport in the country and teams do exist for women to play on though they are few. Participation rates dropped by a large number in 2006. The sport's governing body in the country is not providing much support for the game and faces its own challenges.

== History ==
=== National team ===
Somalia did not have a FIFA recognised senior or youth team by 2006 and have never played in a FIFA sanctioned game. The country has not sent a team to compete in major regional championships including the 2010 African Women's Championships during the preliminary rounds or the 2011 All Africa Games. In March 2012, the team was not ranked in the world by FIFA and did not formally exist.

=== Background and development ===
Women's football in Africa in general faces several challenges, including limited access to education, poverty amongst women in the wider society, and fundamental inequality present in the society that occasionally allows for female specific human rights abuses. At the same time, if quality female players in Africa are developed, many, including Somalis, leave their home countries to seek greater football opportunities in places like Northern Europe or the United States. Funding for women's football in Africa is also an issue: Most of the funding for women's football and for the women's national teams comes from FIFA, not the national football association, which in this case is Somali Football Federation who have not established a women's football programme in the country. Future success for women's football in Africa is dependent on improved facilities and access by women to these facilities. Attempting to commercialise the game is not the solution, as demonstrated by the many youth and women's football camps held on the continent leading to improvements in player skill and increased interest in the sport.

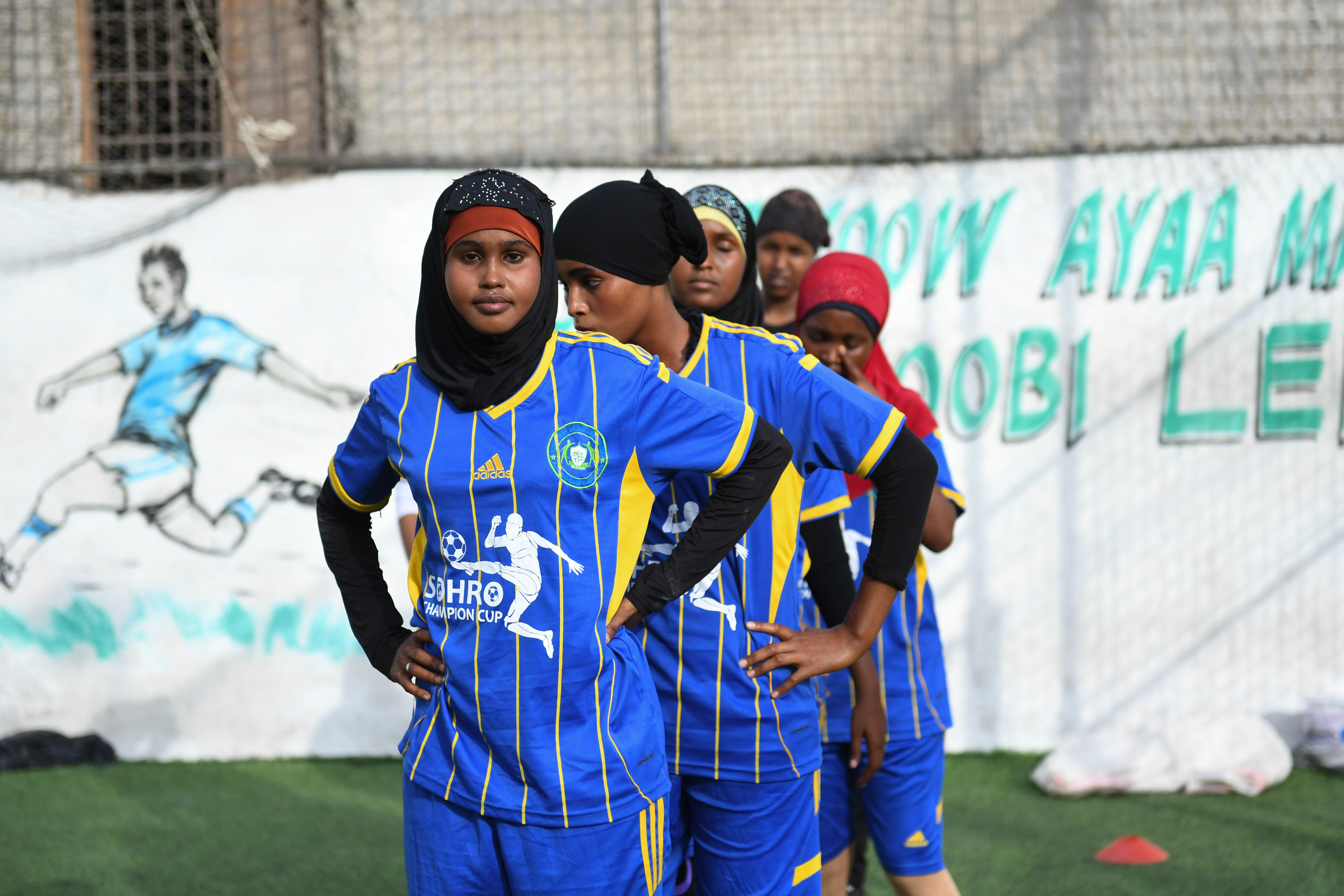
Players for Golden Girls Football Club in a training session in Mogadishu on February 18, 2017

Football is the most popular women's sport in the country. In schools, girls and boys do not play mixed football in Somalia. On the adult level, there are 450 teams, 8 of which are available to women to play as mixed gendered teams and 6 which are women only. In 2000, there were 280 registered female players on the junior and senior levels. This data was not kept from 2001 to 2004. In 2005, there were 1,435 registered female players but in 2006, the number dropped dramatically to 220. This can be contrasted to futsal where there were 175 registered female footballers and 440 unregistered footballers in 2006. In 2005, football was seen as a way to potentially help rebuild the country, with the concept having support from Somali women living abroad. Women from Djibouti have been working to help Somali play football. Muslim extremists inside the country have made it difficult for women to play because of restrictions on what women can do. Inside Somalia, women have been completely prohibited from playing any sport. Rights to broadcast the 2011 Women's World Cup in the country were bought by Al Jazeera, despite the government having banned people from watching the men's competition in 2006 which resulted in several deaths.

Somali Football Federation was founded in 1951 and became a FIFA affiliate in 1962. Between 1991 and 2010 in Somalia, there was no FIFA FUTURO III regional course for women's coaching, no women's football seminar held in the country and no FIFA MA course held for women/youth football. The national federation has six full-time staffers dedicated to supporting women's football, and women's football has representation on the federation's committee. In April 2012, the national football association suffered a setback when its president Said Mohamed Nur was killed in a suicide attack that also killed the president of the country's Olympic Organising Committee.

On 8 July 2019 Golden Girls FC from Mogadishu became the first Somali women’s football team to play an international match. They lost 3-0 to Queen Lozikeyi Academy from Zimbabwe at the 2019 Human Rights Cup.

In 2024, the first ever women's football tournament was played in Somalia. The Somali Football Federation also developed a women's football strategy, with plans to launch a dedicated women's league, along with regional and youth competitions.

In 2025, the participation of an under-17 women's club from Somalia in a regional tournament organized by CECAFA, was supposed to mark the first time that a Somali women's team took part in an international competition, but it ended up withdrawing.
