= Burundi women's national football team =

Women's association football team

Burundi
- Nickname: Swallows (Hirondelles)
- Association: Football Federation of Burundi
- Confederation: CAF (Africa)
- Sub-confederation: CECAFA (East & Central Africa)
- Head coach: Gustave Niyonkuru
- Top scorer: Sandrine Niyonkuru (12)
- FIFA code: BDI
First colours	Second colours

FIFA ranking
- Current: 179 ▲1 (16 June 2026)
- Highest: 169 (June 2022)
- Lowest: 179 (December 2025)

First international
- Unofficial Zanzibar 1–10 Burundi (Jinja, Uganda; 11 September 2016); Official Burundi 0–4 Kenya (Njeru, Uganda; 13 September 2016)

Biggest win
- Unofficial Zanzibar 1–10 Burundi (Jinja, Uganda; 11 September 2019); Official Eritrea 0–5 Burundi (Asmara, Eritrea; 20 October 2021) Burundi 6–1 Djibouti (Ngozi, Burundi; 16 February 2022) Djibouti 0–5 Burundi (Ngozi, Burundi; 21 February 2022)

Biggest defeat
- Tanzania 6–0 Burundi (Chamazi, Tanzania; 17 June 2025)

World Cup
- Appearances: 0

Olympic Games
- Appearances: 0

Africa Women Cup of Nations
- Appearances: 1 (first in 2022)
- Best result: Group stage (2022)

The Burundi women's national football team, nicknamed the Swallows (French: Hirondelles), represents Burundi in women's international football competitions. The team has competed since 2016 in matches recognised by FIFA, the sport's international governing body. A senior national team has been continually inactive, but an under-20 team has played in numerous matches. Further development of football in the country faces challenges found across Africa, including inequality and limited access to education for women. A women's football programme did not exist in Burundi until 2000, and only 455 players had registered for participation on the national level by 2006.

== History ==
In 1985, almost no country in the world had a women's national football team. While the sport grew in popularity worldwide in the ensuing years, Burundi did not have an official team until more than two decades later. By 2009, however, Burundi had a FIFA-recognised senior national team nicknamed the Swallows and a FIFA-recognised Burundi women's national under-20 football team. The under-20 team played one international match in 2002, one in 2004 and one in 2006.

The senior national football team has never competed in a FIFA-sanctioned fixture and has not competed at the Women's World Cup. The team was one of 200 preparing for a qualification tournament for the cup in 2007, but did not play in the competition. The team has withdrawn from numerous other events. Burundi was to play in the 2008 African Women's Championship but withdrew from the tournament, giving the Democratic Republic of the Congo an automatic qualification. The team also withdrew from the 2010 and 2012 editions of the Africa Women Cup of Nations before the first-round qualifiers. Burundi has not participated in other major events on the continent, including the 2011 All-Africa Games. As of March 2012, the team was not ranked by FIFA.

Burundi was scheduled to participate in a competition in 2007 organised by the Confederation of African Football (CAF) in Zanzibar. Nicholas Musonye, the secretary of the Council for East and Central Africa Football Associations (Cecafa), said of the event, "CAF wants to develop women's football in this region in recognition of the milestones Cecafa has achieved over the years. CAF appreciates what Cecafa has done despite the hardships the association has gone through, from financial problems to political instability in member states and poor management of associations. Member states in the Cecafa region have not taken women's football seriously. CAF now wants to sponsor a long-term campaign to attract women from this region into the game." The competition was canceled due to lack of funds.

Burundi's women's team was assembled in 2019 under coach Daniella Niyibimenya in anticipation of the 2019 CECAFA Women's Championship. The team was defeated 2–0 in a match with the Uganda women's national football team. Speaking on the team's lack of permanence and performance, Niyibimenya said, "We have a talented team but they need several warm-up matches to develop their character. Due to a lack of resources, we can only bring the girls together when a competition is announced."

=== Background and development ===
Women's football is now [a] big deal. The standard that we have attained in Africa is good enough. Soon, an African team will challenge seriously for the World Cup. But we need far more support from governments and big business.

— Lydia Nsekera, president of the Football Federation of Burundi

The development of women's football in Africa faces several challenges, including limited access to education, poverty amongst women, inequalities and human rights abuses.

The Football Federation of Burundi, the country's national association, created a woman's football programme in 2000. By 2006, there were just 455 registered women players, and the absence of a thriving women's game has been an obstacle for the national team. Lydia Nsekera is the head of the national football association.

Outside the national federation, the Commission nationale du football féminin was established by the 1990s, and a league and women's teams were organised in the same period in Bujumbura.

== Results and fixtures ==
The following is a list of match results in the last 12 months, as well as any future matches that have been scheduled.

Legend

Win Draw Lose Void or Postponed Fixture

== Coaching staff ==
=== Current coaching staff ===
Updated as February 2025

Position	Name	Ref.
Head coach	(Burundi) Olivier Niyungeko	

=== Manager history ===
- (Burundi) Gustave Niyonkuru (20xx–2023)
- (Burundi) Olivier Mutombola (2023-2024)
- (Burundi) Niyungeko Alain Olivier (2024-)

== Players ==
=== Current squad ===
- The following is the Squad called up for the 2025 CECAFA Women's Championship in June 2025.
- Caps and goals accurate up to and including 30 October 2021.

No.	Pos.	Player	Date of birth (age)	Club
1	GK	Faida Habimana	24 March 2005 (age 21)	(Football Federation of Burundi) Buja Queens
13	GK	Médiatrice Nsabimana	5 July 2010 (age 16)	(Football Federation of Burundi) Arena Star
	GK	Solange Manirakiza		(Football Federation of Burundi) La Colombe
2	DF	Zena Shabani Nahimana	10 October 2007 (age 19)	(Football Federation of Burundi) Top Girls Academy
9	DF	Dorine Irankunda	13 October 2009 (age 17)	(Football Federation of Burundi) Maika
11	DF	Channy Nsabiyuva	7 June 2005 (age 21)	(Football Federation of Burundi) Top Girls Academy
12	DF	Angélique Keza	1 August 2004 (age 22)	(Rwanda Football Federation) Rayon Sport
	DF	Espérance Habonimana	12 April 2007 (age 19)	(Rwanda Football Federation) Police WFC
19	DF	Evelyne Akimana	1 September 2006 (age 20)	(Football Federation of Burundi) La Colombe
20	DF	Annociate Nshimirimana	2 October 2004 (age 22)	(Tanzania Football Federation) Fouantaine Gate
4	MF	Estelle Gakima	21 November 2005 (age 20)	(Football Federation of Burundi) La Colombe
6	MF	Peace Olga Niyomwungere (Captain)	20 December 2005 (age 20)	(Rwanda Football Federation) Rayon Sports
16	MF	Grâce Niyonkuru	1 January 1999 (age 27)	(Football Federation of Burundi) Kazoza Keza
18	MF	Joëlle Bukuru	13 February 1999 (age 27)	(Tanzania Football Federation) Fountain Gate Princess
7	FW	Aniella Uwimana	17 November 1999 (age 26)	(Saudi Arabian Football Federation) Jeddah
8	FW	Erica Kanyamuneza	11 August 2001 (age 25)	(Rwanda Football Federation) Police
	FW	Gloris Gakiza	25 November 2007 (age 18)	(Football Federation of Burundi) Guja Queen
	FW	Rukiya Bizimana	23 March 2006 (age 20)	(Rwanda Football Federation) Rayon Sport
14	FW	Adolphine Salum Rumuri	31 December 2007 (age 18)	(Rwanda Football Federation) Bugesera FC
15	FW	Aline Hakizimana	13 June 2010 (age 16)	(Football Federation of Burundi) Intwarikazi
	FW	Rahay-Roy Nzoyikorera		(Football Federation of Burundi) Top Girls Academy

=== Recent call-ups ===
The following players have been called up to a Burundi squad in the past 12 months.

Pos.	Player	Date of birth (age)	Caps	Goals	Club	Latest call-up
^{INJ} Player withdrew from the squad due to an injury.^{PRE} Preliminary squad.^{SUS} Player is serving a suspension.^{WD} Player withdrew for personal reasons.

=== Previous squads ===
Africa Women Cup of Nations

- 2022 Women's Africa Cup of Nations squads

CECAFA Women's Championship

- 2022 CECAFA Women's Championship squads

== Competitive record ==
Champions Runners-up Third place Fourth place

=== Africa Women Cup of Nations ===
Africa Women Cup of Nations
Year	Round	GP	W	D*	L	GS	GA	GD
1991 to (Namibia) 2014	did not exist							
(Cameroon) 2016	did not enter							
(Ghana) 2018	did not enter							
2020	Cancelled due to COVID-19 pandemic in Africa							
(Morocco) 2022	Group Stage	3	0	0	3	3	11	−8
(Morocco) 2024	Did not qualify							
(Morocco) 2026	Did not qualify							
Total	1/14	3	0	0	3	3	11	−8

(The former format was amended as it did not comply with MOS:FLAG as discussed here)

*Draws include knockout matches decided on penalty kicks.

=== African Games ===
African Games record
Year	Result	Matches	Wins	Draws	Losses	GF	GA
(Nigeria) 2003	did not exist						
(Algeria) 2007	did not exist						
(Mozambique) 2011	did not exist						
(Republic of the Congo) 2015	did not exist						
(Morocco) 2019	See Burundi women's national under-20 football team						
(Ghana) 2023	See Burundi women's national under-20 football team						
Total	0/4	0	0	0	0	0	0

- 2019 and 2023 editions of the football tournament was played by the U-20 team.

=== FIFA Women's World Cup ===
FIFA Women's World Cup record
Year	Result	Pld	W	D*	L	GS	GA	GD
(China) 1991	did not exist							
(Sweden) 1995	did not exist							
(United States) 1999	did not exist							
(United States) 2003	did not exist							
(China) 2007	did not exist							
(Germany) 2011	did not exist							
(Canada) 2015	did not exist							
(France) 2019	did not enter							
(Australia) (New Zealand) 2023	did not qualify							
(Brazil) 2027	did not qualify							
(Mexico) (United States) 2031	To be determined							
(United Kingdom) 2035	To be determined							
Total	0/12	0	0	0	0	0	0	0

*Draws include knockout matches decided on penalty kicks.

=== Olympic Games ===
Summer Olympics record
Year	Result	Pld	W	D*	L	GS	GA	GD
(United States) 1996	did not exist							
(Australia) 2000	did not exist							
(Greece) 2004	did not exist							
(China) 2008	did not exist							
(United Kingdom) 2012	did not exist							
(Brazil) 2016	did not enter							
(Japan) 2020	did not enter							
(France) 2024	did not enter							
Total	0/7	0	0	0	0	0	0	0

*Draws include knockout matches decided on penalty kicks.

=== CECAFA Women's Championship ===
CECAFA Women's Championship
Year	Round	GP	W	D*	L	GS	GA	GD
(Zanzibar) 1986	did not enter							
(Uganda) 2016	Groupe stage	3	1	0	2	10	6	+4
(Rwanda) 2018	did not enter							
(Tanzania) 2019	4th	5	2	0	3	8	11	−3
(Djibouti) 2021	Cancelled							
(Uganda) 2022	Runner-up	5	3	0	2	9	9	0
Total	1/5	0	0	0	0	0	0	0

== Honours ==
=== Regional ===
- CECAFA Women's Championship

Runners-up:

== All−time record against FIFA recognized nations ==
The list shown below shows the Djibouti national football team all−time international record against opposing nations.
*As of xxxxxx after match against xxxx.

Key

Positive balance (more wins than losses)
Neutral balance (as many wins as losses)
Negative balance (more losses than wins)

Against	Pld	W	D	L	GF	GA	GD	Confederation

=== Record per opponent ===
*As ofxxxxx after match against xxxxx.

Key

Positive balance (more wins than losses)
Neutral balance (as many wins as losses)
Negative balance (more losses than wins)

The following table shows Djibouti's all-time official international record per opponent:

Opponent	Pld	W	D	L	GF	GA	GD	W%	Confederation
Total									—

== See also ==
- Football in Burundi
- Women's football in Africa
- African Nations Cup
