= 2022 CECAFA Women's Championship squads =

Football championship

This article describes the squads for the 2022 CECAFA Women's Championship.

The age listed for each player is in May 2022, the first day of the tournament. The numbers of caps and goals listed for each player do not include any matches played after the start of the tournament. The club listed is the club for which the player last played a competitive match prior to the tournament. A flag is included for coaches who are of a different nationality than their own national team.

== Group A ==
=== Burundi ===
Head coach: (Burundi) Gustave Niyonkuru

No.	Pos.	Player	Date of birth (age)	Club
23	GK	Ariella Umurerwa		(Burundi) Fofila PF
13	GK	Amissa Inarukundo		(Burundi) Rain Bow
13	GK	Belinda Ndoreraho		(Burundi)
30	DF	Annociate Nshimirimana		(Burundi) Rain Bow
22	DF	Angélique Keza		(Burundi) PVP
5	DF	Diane Irankunda		(Burundi) Fofila PF
17	DF	Nasra Nahimana		(Burundi) PVP
	DF	Djazila Uwineza		(Burundi) Rain Bow
6	MF	Peace Olga Niyomwungere		(Burundi) La colombe FC
11	MF	Asha Djafari (captain)		(Burundi)
18	MF	Joëlle Bukuru	13 February 1999 (age 26)	(Tanzania) Simba Queens
15	MF	Charlotte Irankunda		(Burundi) Fofila PF
4	FW	Zilfa Suzanne		(Burundi)
4	FW	Rachelle Bukuru		(Burundi) Onze etoiles
	FW	Bora Ineza		(Burundi) Fofila Pf
3	FW	Falonne Nahimana		
9	FW	Rukiya Bizimana		(Burundi) Etoile du matin
10	FW	Sandrine Niyonkuru		(France) Fontain AC
3	FW	Aldophine Rumuri		
3	FW	Gloris Gakiza		
7	FW	Aniella Uwimana		(Tanzania) Yanga Princess

=== Djibouti ===
Head coach: (Djibouti) Hassan kako

=== Rwanda ===
Head coach: (Rwanda) Sosthenes Habimana

No.	Pos.	Player	Date of birth (age)	Club
	GK	Judith Nyirabashitsi		(Rwanda) AS Kigali
	GK	Claudine Itangishaka		(Democratic Republic of the Congo) OCL City
	GK	Jeanne Pauline Umuhoza		(Rwanda)
	DF	Gloria Nibagwire (captain)	14 August 1982 (age 42)	(Rwanda) AS Kigali
	DF	Immaculate Uwimbabazi		(Rwanda) As Kigali
	DF	Constance Muhawenimana		(Rwanda) Inyemera WFC
	DF	Providence Mukahirwe		(Rwanda) Fatima WFC
	DF	Louise Maniraguha		(Rwanda) AS Kigali
	DF	Joselyne Mukantaganira		(Rwanda) AS Kigali
	DF	Lydia Uzayisenga		(Rwanda) APAER WFC
	DF	Irera Umuziranenga		(Rwanda) FATIMA WFC
	DF	Marie Claire Mukarwego		(Rwanda) Inyemera WFC
	MF	Alice Kalimba		(Rwanda) AS Kigali
	MF	Nadine Mukandayisenga		(Rwanda) AS Kigali
	MF	Jeanette Mukeshimana		(Rwanda) AS Kigali
	MF	Marie Claire Uwamahoro		(Rwanda) Inyemera WFC
	MF	Zawadi Usanase		(Rwanda) AS Kigali
	MF	Liberthee Nibagwire		(Rwanda) AS Kigali
	MF	Dorothee Mukeshimana		(Rwanda) AS Kigali
	FW	Marie Claire Dukuzumuremyi		(Rwanda) Youvia WFC
	FW	Callixte Iradukunda		(Rwanda) As Kigali
	FW	Anne Marie Ibangarye		(Rwanda) Fitima WFC
	FW	Grace Uwase		(Rwanda)

=== Uganda ===
Head coach: (Uganda) George Lutalo

No.	Pos.	Player	Date of birth (age)	Club
	GK	Daisy Nakaziro	1997 or 1998	Uganda Martyrs WFC
	GK	Juliet Adeke	2000 (age 24–25)	(Uganda) Kawempe Muslim Ladies
	GK	Daphine Nyayenga	19 December 2004 (age 20)	(Uganda) She Corporate FC
	DF	Asia Nakibuuka	2002 or 2003	(Uganda) Kawempe Muslim Ladies
	DF	Sumayah Komuntale	3 August 2003 (age 21)	(Uganda) Tooro Queens
	DF	Lukia Namubiru		(Uganda) Kampala Queens FC
	DF	Shadia Nankya	25 November 2001 (age 23)	(Uganda) UCU Lady Cardinals
	DF	Margaret Namirimu		(Uganda) She Corporate FC
	DF	Samalie Nakacwa	15 January 2003 (age 22)	(Uganda) Kawempe Muslim Ladies
	DF	Aisha Nantongo	6 April 2002 (age 23)	(Uganda) Kawempe Muslim Ladies
	MF	Phionah Nabbumba	20 July 2000 (age 25)	(Uganda) She Corporate
	MF	Joan Nabirye	25 June 1998 (age 27)	(Kenya) Vihiga Queens
	MF	Sheebah Zalwango	2000 or 2001	(Democratic Republic of the Congo) FC Amani
	MF	Shamirah Nalugya	12 September 2003 (age 21)	(Uganda) Kampala Queens FC
	MF	Riticia Nabbosa	1997 or 1998	(Uganda) Lady Doves
	FW	Juliet Nalukenge		(Cyprus) Chrysomolia FC
	FW	Fazila Ikwaput	5 August 1997 (age 27)	(Uganda) Lady Doves
	FW	Sandra Nabweteme	1 November 1996 (age 28)	Unattached
	FW	Hasifa Nassuna		(Uganda) UCU Lady Cardinals FC
	FW	Lilian Mutuuzo	22 December 2002 (age 22)	(Uganda) Kampala Queens
	FW	Margret Kunihira	9 September 2004 (age 20)	(Uganda) Kampala Queens
	FW	Zainah Nandede	15 October 2003 (age 21)	(Uganda) Kampala Queens FC
	FW	Natasha Shirazi	8 February 1996 (age 29)	(Israel) Maccabi Kishronot Hadera

== Group B ==
=== Ethiopia ===
Head coach: (Ethiopia) Frew Hailegbrael

No.	Pos.	Player	Date of birth (age)	Caps	Goals	Club
	GK	Tarikwa Bergena				(Ethiopia) CBE
	GK	Yemwodish Yergashewa				(Ethiopia) Adama
	GK	Betelhem Yohannes				(Ethiopia) Addis Ababa
	DF	Bizuayehu Aymeku				(Ethiopia)
	DF	Betelhem Bekele				(Ethiopia)
	DF	Assabe Muso				(Ethiopia)
	DF	Kidist Zeleke				(Ethiopia)
	DF	Nardos Mekonnen				(Ethiopia) Adama Ketema FC
	DF	Birkie Amare				(Ethiopia) Diredawa
	MF	Nybogne Yen				(Ethiopia) Electric
	MF	Emebet Asfaw				Ethiopia Nigd Bank SA
	MF	Genet Hailu				(Ethiopia) Mekelakeya SC
	MF	Meadin Sahilu				(Ethiopia) Mekelakeya SC
	MF	Mesay Tanga				(Ethiopia) Mekelakeya SC
	MF	Birtukan Ware	30 November 1988 (age 36)			Ethiopia Nigd Bank SA
	FW	Rediet Matios				(Ethiopia) Hawassa Ketema FC
	FW	Aregash Tadesse				Ethiopia Nigd Bank SA
	FW	Loza Geinore				Ethiopia Nigd Bank SA
	FW	Rehima Zergaw				(Ethiopia) Mekelakeya SC
	FW	Senaf Demise				(Ethiopia) Mekelakeya SC
	FW	Ariet Odong				(Ethiopia) Addis Ababa
	FW	Turist Lemma				(Ethiopia) Hawassa Ketema FC
	FW	Nigist Bekele				(Ethiopia) Bole

=== South Sudan ===
Head coach: (South Africa) Shilene Booysen

No.	Pos.	Player	Date of birth (age)	Caps	Goals	Club
	GK	Goyo Lino Margret				(South Sudan) Atlabara
	GK	Khalda Hassan Tutu				(South Sudan) El-Merreikh
	GK	Isaac Henri Nawal				(South Sudan) Yei Joint Stars
	DF	Amadrio Filda Bandas				(South Sudan) El Merriekh FC
	DF	Sumaya Malili Taban				(South Sudan) Yei Join Stars
	DF	Doka Geroald				(South Sudan) El Merriekh FC
	DF	Issa Oliver				(South Sudan) Munuki FC
	DF	Nakirijja Annet				(South Sudan) Yei Join Stars
	DF	Esther Luis				(South Sudan) Muniki FC
	DF	Ester Kide				(South Sudan) El Merriekh FC
	MF	Makunga Maurine				(South Sudan) Yei Join Stars
	MF	Chieng Thomas				(South Sudan) El Merriekh FC
	MF	Luis Johnson Mariam				(South Sudan) Yei Joint Stars
	MF	Apayi Hatima				(South Sudan) Yei Join Stars
	MF	Ester Mercy				(South Sudan)
	MF	Viola Idaha				(South Sudan) Atlabara WFC
	MF	Mary Dawa				(South Sudan) Yei Join Stars
	MF	Amy Lasu (captain)	8 November 1995 (age 29)			(South Sudan) El Merriekh FC
	FW	Josphine Makuei				(South Sudan)
	FW	Debora Stephen				(South Sudan) Yei Join Stars
	FW	Sarah Aparo				(South Sudan) El Merriekh FC
	FW	Mary Anger				(South Sudan) Yei Join Stars
	FW	Stella Chaplan				(South Sudan) Yei Join Stars

=== Tanzania ===
Head coach: Oscar Mirambo

No.	Pos.	Player	Date of birth (age)	Club
1	GK	Janeth Shija		(Tanzania) Simba Queens
18	GK	Gelwa Yona		(Tanzania) Simba Queens
20	GK	Asha Mrisho		(Tanzania) The Tiger Queens
5	DF	Fatuma Issa	9 May 1995 (age 30)	(Tanzania) Simba Queens
2	DF	Violeth Mchela		(Tanzania) Simba Queens
3	MF	Eva Jackson		
4	MF	Amina Bilali		(Tanzania) Yanga Princess
12	MF	Janeth Pangamwene		(Tanzania) Mlandizi Queens
13	MF	Silvia Thomas		(Tanzania) Simba Queens
15	MF	Julietha Singano		(Tanzania) Simba Queens
7	FW	Mwanahamis Omary	16 October 1989 (age 35)	(Tanzania) Simba Queens
10	FW	Opa Clement	14 February 2001 (age 24)	(Tanzania) Simba Queens
11	FW	Diana Msewa		(Morocco) AUSFAZ
14	FW	Amina Ramadhani		(Tanzania) Simba Queens
17	FW	Enekia Kasonga	20 May 2002 (age 23)	(Morocco) AUSFAZ
6		Protasia Mbunda		(Tanzania) Fountain Gate Princess
23		Esta Mabanza		
19		Irene Kisisa		(Tanzania) Yanga Princess
8		Agnes Sawe		
22		Aisha Juma		(Tanzania) Yanga Princess

=== Zanzibar ===
Head coach:
