= Meseret Manne =

Ethiopian football coach

Personal information
- Full name: Meseret Manne
- Place of birth: Ethiopia

Meseret Manne (also spelled Meseret Manni) is an Ethiopian football coach. She served as head coach of the Ethiopia women's national football team from 2016 to 2017.

== Coaching career ==
In 2016, Manne was appointed head coach of the Ethiopia women's national team ahead of the 2016 CECAFA Women’s Championship tournament in Jinja, Uganda. She named a squad of 20 players for the competition, which included players such as Loza Abera and Birtukan GebreKirstos.

During the team’s preparation, she oversaw a residential training camp where the squad engaged in preparatory matches, including games against male club sides. She was listed as the national women's team manager for 2016–2017.

== Club coaching ==
Before her national team role, Meseret Manne coached Dire Dawa Kenema (also known as Dire Dawa City SC) in Ethiopia’s top division. She became one of the first women to coach a club in the Ethiopian Premier League.

Her role in leading the club to promotion to the Ethiopian Premier League has been described in media reports as a milestone for female coaches in Ethiopian football.
