= Stumai Athumani =

Tanzanian footballer (born 1997)

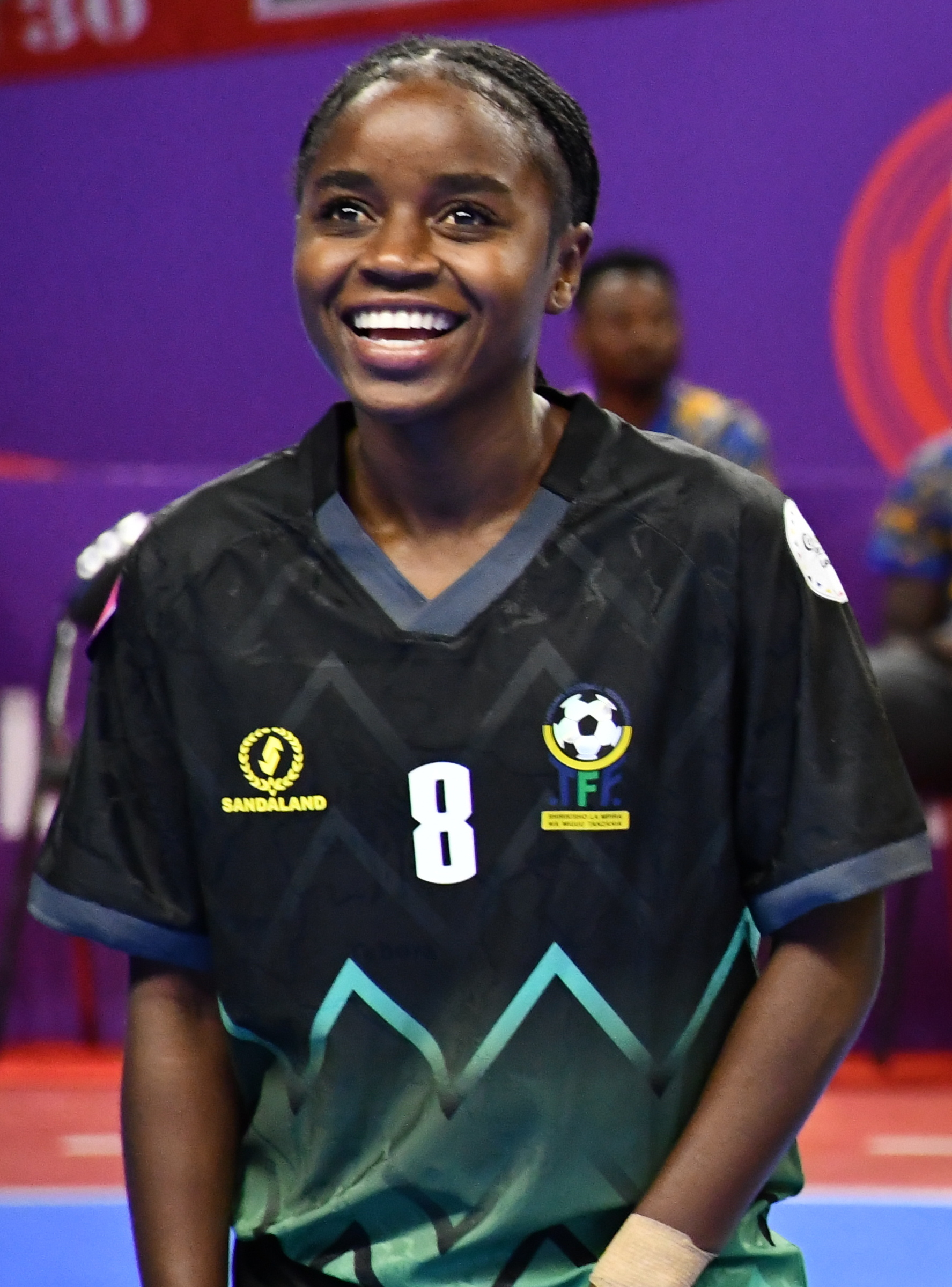
- Stumai during 2025 WAFCON Futsal.

Personal information
- Full name: Stumai Abdallah Athumani
- Date of birth: 25 August 1997 (age 29)
- Position: Midfielder

Team information
- Current team: JKT Queens

Senior career*
Years	Team	Apps	(Gls)
- JKT Queens

International career^{‡}
	Tanzania	18	(5)
- * Club domestic league appearances and goals ‡ National team caps and goals as of 12 July 2025

Stumai Abdallah Athumani (born 25 August 1997) is a Tanzanian military officer and professional footballer who plays as a midfielder for JKT Queens and the Tanzania women's national team.

== International career ==
In 2018, Athumani was called up to the Tanzania women's national team. She scored one goal in their run to winning the 2018 CECAFA Women's Championship by scoring third goal in the goal in eventual 4–1 victory over Ethiopia.

Athumani was selected for Tanzania's final 21-person squad for the 2021 COSAFA Women's Championship. She would go on to start in all five of Tanzania's games and play every minute.

On 4 October, in the final group stage game against fellow guest team South Sudan, Athumani scored a hat-trick which led to 3–0 win and qualification to the semi-final. In the semi-final she played the full 90 minutes as Tanzania won via 3–2 penalty shootout after the match ended in a 1–1 draw. On 15 July, she was named as a starter, as Tanzania beat Malawi 1–0 in the final to win the competition for the first time in history.

== Honours ==
- CECAFA Women's Championship: 2018, 2025
- COSAFA Women's Championship: 2021
