= Charles Ayiekoh Lukula =

Ugandan football coach

Personal information
- Full name: Charles Ayiekoh Lukula

Managerial career
- Years: Team
- Maroons FC
- Kirinya Jinja SS
- SOANA
- Water FC
- Wandegeya FC
- Bunamwaya SC
- Horizon FC
- URA FC
- 2023-24: Kampala Queens FC

Charles Ayiekoh Lukula is a Ugandan football coach. He was the head coach at FUFA Women Super League Champions Kampala Queens FC.

== Work history ==
Charles joined FUFA Women Super League Champions Kampala Queens FC after working with She Corporate during the CAF Women's Champions League zonal qualifiers which took place in Tanzania. He previously coached at Maroons FC, Kirinya Jinja SS (now Busoga United), SOANA, Water FC, Wandegeya FC, Bunamwaya SC, Horizon FC and Uganda Revenue Authority (URA FC). He also serves with Makerere University Business School (MUBS) in the Pepsi University Football League and the National Beach Soccer league. He started working with Crested Cranes ahead of the 2024 Summer Olympics qualifiers. He was appointed for a month interim basis ahead of the FUFA Technical Centre, Njeru that took place Thursday, October 26, 2023.

== See also ==
- Uganda women's national football team
- Maroons FC
- Federation of Uganda Football Associations
