= Ruth Aturo =

Ugandan footballer (born 1995)

- Aturo with Uganda in 2026

Personal information
- Date of birth: 19 July 1995 (age 31)
- Place of birth: Soroti, Uganda
- Height: 1.57 m (5 ft 2 in)
- Position: Goalkeeper

Team information
- Current team: Simba Queens
- Number: 1

Senior career*
Years	Team	Apps	(Gls)
- UCU Lady Cardinals
2021–2022	KTP Naiset		
2022–2023	Al Shabab	2	(0)
2023	Al Taqadoum		
2024	Vihiga Queens		
2025	Tausi Women FC		
2025-	Simba Queens		

International career^{‡}
2021–	Uganda	4	(0)
- * Club domestic league appearances and goals ‡ National team caps and goals as of 26 October 2021

Ruth Aturo (born 19 July 1995) is a Ugandan footballer who plays as a goalkeeper for Tanzanian Women's premier league club Simba Queens and the Uganda women's national team.

== Club career ==
Ruth Aturo began her football journey at Soroti Secondary School. Her talent attracted the attention of Kawempe Muslim Secondary School technical team who later ensured that she joined Kawempe Muslim Secondary School for her A level Studies while she played for their club Kawempe Muslim Ladies FC in the FUFA Women Elite League where she helped the team win several titles. Her performances between the sticks attracted the attention of Uganda Christian University who offered her a scholarship and also added her to the ranks of their women's football club, UCU Lady Cardinals.

Aturo has played for UCU Lady Cardinals in Uganda.

In 2022, Ruth Aturo joined Football Club Kotkan Työväen Palloilijat (FC KTP) on a two-year contract .

In 2023, Aturo played for Vihiga queens at the CAF Champions league CECAFA Zonal qulifiers held in Uganda.

In 2025, Aturo joined Tausi Women FC, formerly known as Ukerewe Queens after her departure from Kenyan side Vihiga Queens.

== International career ==
Aturo capped for Uganda at senior level during the 2021 COSAFA Women's Championship and the 2022 Africa Women Cup of Nations qualification.

In 2025, Aturo was part of the Crested Cranes squad that played Ethiopia in the Women Africa Cup of Nations 2026 Qualifiers.

Aturo was part of the 34 players squad to play against Zambia in Olympic Qualifiers in October 2026.
