= Tanzania women's national football team =

Tanzania
- Nickname: Twiga Stars
- Association: Tanzania Football Federation
- Confederation: CAF (Africa)
- Sub-confederation: CECAFA (East & Central Africa)
- Head coach: Oscar Mirambo
- Captain: Amina Bilali
- FIFA code: TAN
First colours	Second colours	Third colours

FIFA ranking
- Current: 122 ▼1 (16 June 2026)
- Highest: 98 (June 2009)
- Lowest: 155 (August 2022)

First international
- Eritrea 2–3 Tanzania (Asmara, Eritrea; 10 August 2002)

Biggest win
- Tanzania 12–0 Zanzibar (Njeru, Uganda; 6 June 2022)

Biggest defeat
- South Africa 6–0 Tanzania (Johannesburg, South Africa; 24 July 2010)

African Women's Championship
- Appearances: 3 (first in 2010)
- Best result: Group stage (2010, 2024, 2026)

The Tanzania national women's football team is the national team of Tanzania and is controlled by the Tanzania Football Federation. They are nicknamed the Twiga Stars.

The Twiga Stars qualified for their first CAF Women's Championship finals on 5 June 2010, after defeating Eritrea 11–4 on aggregate.

== History ==
=== 2010 ===
The Twiga Stars defeated Ethiopia in the preliminary round of the 2010 African Women's Football Championship on aggregate 4–2. The first leg was played in Addis Ababa on 8 March. Tanzania won the match 3–1, with goals by Ester Chabruma, Mwanahamis Omary, and Asha Rashid. The return leg played at Uhuru Stadium in Dar es Salaam on 29 March ended in a 1–1 draw.

In the first round of the African Championship, Tanzania defeated Eritrea on aggregate 11–4. The Twiga Stars won 8–1 in Dar es Salaam on 23 May and drew 3–3 in Asmara on 5 June.

After the Twiga Stars' success in qualifying for the African Championship finals in South Africa, a Tanzanian businesswoman, Rahma Al-Kharoosi, sponsored them to train in the United States for two weeks in August 2010. Tanzanian President Jakaya Kikwete donated 53 million Tanzanian shillings (approximately US$30,000) on 9 June to cover training camp expenses and allowances before the championship tournament.

Tanzania lost all three games in Group A of the African Championship, to the hosts South Africa 2–1 on 31 October, Mali 3–2 on 4 November, and Nigeria 3–0 on 7 November.

They are the subject of the 2010 documentary film Twiga Stars: Tanzania's Soccer Sisters by Nisha Ligon.

=== 2011 ===
Tanzania qualified for the 2011 All-Africa Games in Maputo when its opponents in the qualifying rounds, Kenya, Uganda, and Sudan, declined to play. The Twiga Stars finished in third place in the four-team Group B at the games. They lost to Ghana 2–1 on 5 September, drew with South Africa 2–2 on 8 September, and drew with Zimbabwe 2–2 on 11 September.

=== 2012 ===
In the preliminary round of the 2012 African Women's Championship, Tanzania defeated Namibia 2–0 in Windhoek on 14 January and 5–2 in Dar es Salaam on 29 January. In the first round, Tanzania lost to Ethiopia 2–1 in Addis Ababa on 27 May and 1–0 in Dar es Salaam on 16 June. Tanzania thus failed to qualify for the finals of the African Championship in Equatorial Guinea. The head coach, Charles Boniface Mkwasa, resigned two days after the last match with Ethiopia, and the following day, Nasra Mohammed, the assistant coach, blamed inadequate financial support from the Tanzania Football Federation for the failure to advance.

On 21 June, Mkwasa admitted that he had dismissed several players from the team after discovering that they had engaged in homosexual acts.

It is true that some of the players engaged themselves in homosexuality, but we removed them from the team as soon as we learnt of their behaviour. We took the decision regardless of the player's ability and contribution in the team. There is this problem that these players want to behave like their male counterparts, because they play football, they want to look like men players. But I have always been very tough on this. I have been talking to them, trying to counsel them on how they should behave and I think there is tremendous change on that area and of course their discipline is generally good.

At a subsequent news conference, Mkwasa claimed he had been misquoted. Lina Mhando, the chairperson of Tanzania Women Football, called it a "non-existing scandal" and said there is no concrete proof of the allegations. The team manager, Furaha Francis, said that regardless of whether the scandal exists, it has been blown out of proportion and that there is no proof to substantiate the allegations.

=== 2014 ===
Zambia defeated Tanzania in the first round of qualifying for the 2014 African Women's Football Championship on aggregate 3–2.

=== 2015 ===
Tanzania has qualified for the 2015 All-Africa Games in Brazzaville, Republic of the Congo by defeating Zambia in the second round of qualifying on aggregate 6–5.

== Results and fixtures ==
The following is a list of match results in the last 12 months, as well as any future matches that have been scheduled.

Legend

Win Draw Loss Void or postponed Fixture

=== 2025 ===
22 October 2026 WAfCON Qualifying	Tanzania	2–0	Ethiopia	Dar es Salaam, Tanzania
17:00 UTC+3	Mnunka 7'; Mnunduka 54'	Report		Stadium: Azam Complex Stadium; Referee: Aminata Fullah (Sierra Leone)

28 October 2026 WAfCON Qualifying	Ethiopia	0–1	Tanzania	Addis Ababa, Ethiopia
15:00 UTC+3		Report	Msewa 15'	Stadium: Abebe Bikila Stadium; Referee: Agnes Ngoma (Congo)

=== 2026 ===
28 February 2026 Pink Ladies Cup	Russia	4–1	Tanzania	Sharjah, United Arab Emirates
20:00 UTC+3	yuklyaeva 1'; Smirnova 43' (pen.), 65'; Lushnikova 82'	Report	Gerald 85'	Stadium: Al Hamriya Sports Club Stadium

13 April International friendly	Morocco	3–0	Tanzania	Rabat, Morocco
21:00 UTC+1	Mssoudy 4', 77'; M'rabet 80'	Report		Stadium: Moulay El Hassan Stadium

3 June Friendly [Non-FIFA]	Tanzania	1–0	Malawi	Dar es Salaam, Tanzania
14:00 UTC+2	Katunzi 48'	Report		Stadium: KMC Complex

6 June Friendly [Non-FIFA]	Tanzania	0–0	Malawi	Dar es Salaam, Tanzania
15:00 UTC+2		Report		Stadium: KMC Complex

20 July Friendly [Non-FIFA]	Ghana	0–0	Tanzania	Casablanca, Morocco
20:00 UTC+3		Report		Stadium: LANORIA Field

23 July Friendly [Non-FIFA]	Nigeria	2–1	Tanzania	Casablanca, Morocco
20:00 UTC+3	Ajibade 14'; Okoronkwo 88'	Report	Clement 79'	Stadium: LANORIA Field

27 July 2026 WAfCON GS	South Africa	1–2	Tanzania	Casablanca, Morocco
18:00 UTC+1	Mbane 45+2'	Report	Msewa 37'; Ubamba 87'	Stadium: Moulay Rachid Stadium; Referee: Shahenda El Maghrabi (Egypt)

31 July 2026 WAfCON GS	Burkina Faso	2–1	Tanzania	Casablanca, Morocco
21:00 UTC+1	Kabré 43'; B. Sawadogo 80'	Report	Ubamba (red card) 55'; Mnunka 62'	Stadium: Larbi Zaouli Stadium; Referee: Yacine Samassa (Mauritania)

4 August 2026 WAfCON GS	Tanzania	1–2	Ivory Coast	Casablanca, Morocco
21:00 UTC+1	Msewa 90+9' (pen.)	Report	Ouedraogo 44'; Konan 68' (pen.)	Stadium: Larbi Zaouli Stadium; Referee: Antsino Twanyanyukwa (Namibia)

== Coaching staff ==
=== Current Coaching staff ===
As of 5 June 2025

Staff
Role	Name
Head Coach	Bakari Nyundo Shime
Goalkeeper Coach	Maimuna Said Mkane
Assistant Coach	Bertha Marco Kazobe
Team Manager	Neema Hassan Issa
Team Doctors	Sechelela Michael Pesse; Subira Salehe Mipiko
Equipment Manager	Amina Mwinchuma Hatibu

=== Manager history ===
- Rogasian Kaijage (????–2021)
- Bakari Shime(2021–2022)
- Oscar Mirambo( 2022–2023)
- Bakari Shime(2023–present)

== Players ==
=== Current squad ===
The following players were called up for the 2026 WAFCON matches from 26 July through 16 August 2026.

No.	Pos.	Player	Date of birth (age)	Club
1	GK	Nusra Jafari	20 December 2010 (aged 15)	(Tanzania Football Federation) Fountain Gate Princess
2	DF	Anastazia Katunzi	29 January 1996 (aged 30)	(Tanzania Football Federation) JKT Queens
3	FW	Hasnath Ubamba	8 July 2006 (aged 20)	(Royal Spanish Football Federation) Madrid CFF
4	DF	Edina Makamba	5 December 2008 (aged 17)	(Tanzania Football Federation) Tausi
5	MF	Fatuma Issa Maonyo	6 April 1995 (aged 31)	(Tanzania Football Federation) Simba Queens
6	MF	Donisia Minja	9 August 1996 (aged 29)	(Tanzania Football Federation) JKT Queens
7	FW	Opah Clement (captain)	14 February 2001 (aged 25)	(Royal Spanish Football Federation) Eibar
8	MF	Stumai Athumani	25 August 1997 (aged 28)	(Tanzania Football Federation) JKT Queens
9	FW	Aisha Mnunka	26 July 2005 (aged 21)	(Tanzania Football Federation) Simba Queens
10	MF	Mary Siyame	25 October 2008 (aged 17)	(Tanzania Football Federation) Fountain Gate Princess
11	MF	Diana Msewa	13 November 2001 (aged 24)	(Turkish Football Federation) Trabzonspor
12	FW	Asha Omary	5 May 2009 (aged 17)	(Tanzania Football Federation) Simba Queens
13	MF	Alia Fikiri	1 September 2006 (aged 19)	(Tanzania Football Federation) JKT Queens
14	FW	Asha Rashid Mlangwa	12 January 1991 (aged 35)	(Tanzania Football Federation) JKT Queens
15	DF	Julitha Singano	8 February 2001 (aged 25)	(Saudi Arabian Football Federation) Al-Nassr
16	DF	Ester Maseke	3 June 2008 (aged 18)	(Tanzania Football Federation) JKT Queens
17	FW	Enekia Lunyamila	20 April 2002 (aged 24)	(Mexican Football Federation) Querétaro
18	GK	Najiat Abbas	2 April 1997 (aged 29)	(Tanzania Football Federation) JKT Queens
19	MF	Elizabeth Chenge	25 July 2011 (aged 15)	(Tanzania Football Federation) JKT Queens
20	GK	Janeth Shija	5 November 2003 (aged 22)	(Tanzania Football Federation) Simba Queens
21	DF	Violeth Nicholaus	9 February 2005 (aged 21)	(Egyptian Football Association) Palm Hills
22	DF	Diana Mnally	11 September 2006 (aged 19)	(Tanzania Football Federation) Yanga Princess
23	DF	Ester Mabanza	13 March 2003 (aged 23)	(Tanzania Football Federation) Yanga Princess
24	FW	Bahati Steven	24 December 2010 (aged 15)	(Tanzania Football Federation) Bunda Queens
25	MF	Winfrida Charles	20 October 2008 (aged 17)	(Tanzania Football Federation) Fountain Gate Princess
26	DF	Noela Luhala	25 December 2005 (aged 20)	(Lithuanian Football Federation) Žalgiris

=== Recent call-ups ===
The following players have been called up to a Tanzania squad in the past 12 months.

Pos.	Player	Date of birth (age)	Caps	Goals	Club	Latest call-up
GK	Asha Mrisho				(Tanzania) JKT Queens	v. Ethiopia,2025
DF	Lidya Maximilian				(Tanzania) JKT Queens	v. Ethiopia,2025
DF	Christer Bahera				(Tanzania) JKT Queens	v. Ethiopia,2025
MF	Janeth Pangamwene				(Tanzania) JKT Queens	v. Ethiopia,2025
MF	Asha Ramadhan				(Tanzania) Simba Queens	v. Ethiopia,2025
MF	Suzan Adam				(Tanzania) Tausi Queens	v. Ethiopia,2025
FW	Clara Luvanga	25 February 2005 (age 21)			(Saudi Arabia) Al Nassr	v. Ethiopia,2025
FW	Jamila Rajab				(Tanzania) JKT Queens	v. Ethiopia,2025

=== Previous squads ===
COSAFA Women's Championship

- 2020 COSAFA Women's Championship squad
- 2022 COSAFA Women's Championship squad

CECAFA Women's Championship

- 2022 CECAFA Women's Championship squads
- 2025 CECAFA Women's Championship squads

== Records ==
- *Active players in **bold**, statistics correct as of 2020.

=== Most capped players ===
#	Player	Year(s)	Caps

=== Top goalscorers ===
#	Player	Year(s)	Goals	Caps

== Competitive record ==
=== FIFA Women's World Cup ===
FIFA Women's World Cup record
Year	Result	Pld	W	D*	L	GS	GA	GD
(China) 1991	did not exist							
(Sweden) 1995	did not exist							
(United States) 1999	did not exist							
(United States) 2003	did not qualify							
(China) 2007	did not qualify							
(Germany) 2011	did not qualify							
(Canada) 2015	did not qualify							
(France) 2019	did not qualify							
(Australia) (New Zealand) 2023	did not qualify							
(Brazil) 2027	did not qualify							
(Costa Rica) (Jamaica) (Mexico) (United States) 2031	To be determined							
(United Kingdom) 2035	To be determined							
Total	0/12	0	0	0	0	0	0	0

*Draws include knockout matches decided on penalty kicks.

=== Olympic Games ===
Summer Olympics record
Year	Result	Pld	W	D*	L	GS	GA	GD
(United States) 1996	did not exist							
(Australia) 2000	did not exist							
(Greece) 2004	did not qualify							
(China) 2008	did not qualify							
(United Kingdom) 2012	did not qualify							
(Brazil) 2016	did not qualify							
(Japan) 2020	did not qualify							
(France) 2024	did not qualify							
(United States) 2028	To be determined							
Total	0/9	0	0	0	0	0	0	0

*Draws include knockout matches decided on penalty kicks.

=== Women's Africa Cup of Nations ===
Africa Women Cup of Nations record
Year	Round	GP	W	D	L	GF	GA
1991	did not exist						
1995	did not exist						
(Nigeria) 1998	did not exist						
(South Africa) 2000	did not exist						
(Nigeria) 2002	did not qualify						
(South Africa) 2004	did not qualify						
(Nigeria) 2006	did not qualify						
(Equatorial Guinea) 2008	did not qualify						
(South Africa) 2010	**Group stage**	3	0	0	3	3	8
(Equatorial Guinea) 2012	did not qualify						
(Namibia) 2014	did not qualify						
(Cameroon) 2016	did not qualify						
(Ghana) 2018	did not qualify						
(Morocco) 2022	did not qualify						
(Morocco) 2024	**Group stage**	3	0	1	2	2	6
(Morocco) 2026	**Group stage**	3	1	0	2	4	5
Total:3/16	Group stage	9	1	1	7	9	19

=== African Games ===
African Games record
Year	Round	GP	W	D	L	GS	GA
(Nigeria) 2003	did not qualify						
(Algeria) 2007	did not qualify						
(Mozambique) 2011	Group Stage	3	0	2	1	5	6
(Republic of the Congo) 2015	Group Stage	3	0	1	2	1	5
(Morocco) 2019	See Tanzania women's national under-20 football team						
(Ghana) 2023	See Tanzania women's national under-20 football team						
Total	**2/4**	6	0	3	3	6	11

=== CECAFA Women's Championship ===
CECAFA Women's Championship
Year	Round	GP	W	D*	L	GS	GA	GD
(Zanzibar) 1986
(Uganda) 2016	**Winner**	4	3	1	0	9	4	+5
(Rwanda) 2018	**Winner**	4	2	1	1	9	4	+5
(Tanzania) 2019	**Runner-up**	5	4	0	1	21	2	+19
(Djibouti) 2021	Cancelled							
(Uganda) 2022	**Fourth**	5	2	1	2	18	6	+12
(Tanzania) 2025	**Winner**	4	4	0	0	13	0	+13
**Total**	3/5	22	15	3	4	70	16	+54

== Honours ==
=== Regional ===
- **COSAFA Women's Championship**

Champions: 2021

- **CECAFA Women's Championship**

Champions: 2016, 2018, 2025

== See also ==
- Sport in Tanzania
  - Football in Tanzania
    - Women's football in Tanzania
- Tanzania women's national under-20 football team
- Tanzania women's national under-17 football team
- Tanzania men's national football team
