= Shakirah Nankwanga =

Ugandan football player (born 2002)

Shakirah Nankwanga (born 15 July 2002) is a Ugandan player at Kampala Queens Women Football Club. The club is headed by Ethiopian coach Asefa Firew Hailegebal. Nakawanga plays in the FUFA Women Super League.

== Career ==
She began her football career in Kawempe Muslim Ladies Football Club before moving to Kampala Queens Football Club.

In 2024, during the 13th African Games in Ghana, Nakawanga played with the Uganda U20 Women's National team. She scored a penalty that secured the team a bronze medal, defeating the opposing Senegal team in a 3rd-place playoff game at Cape Coast Stadium.

She also plays tournaments within East Africa.

== See also ==
- Shamirah Nalugya
- Fauzia Najjemba
