= 2025 WAFU Zone B Women's Cup =

Tournament details
- Host country: Benin
- Dates: 7–12 November
- Teams: TBD (from 1 sub-confederation)
- Venue: (in 1 host city)
- All statistics correct as of TBD.

The 2025 WAFU Zone B Women's Cup will be the third edition of the international women's football event for teams from Zone B of the West African Football Union (WAFU). The competition will be hosted by Benin, and Nigeria will be the defending champions. All team can participate. Benin, Nigeria, and Ghana will participate after tournament was changed to a U-20 tournament.
