= Sylvia Kabene =

Ugandan footballer (born 2007)

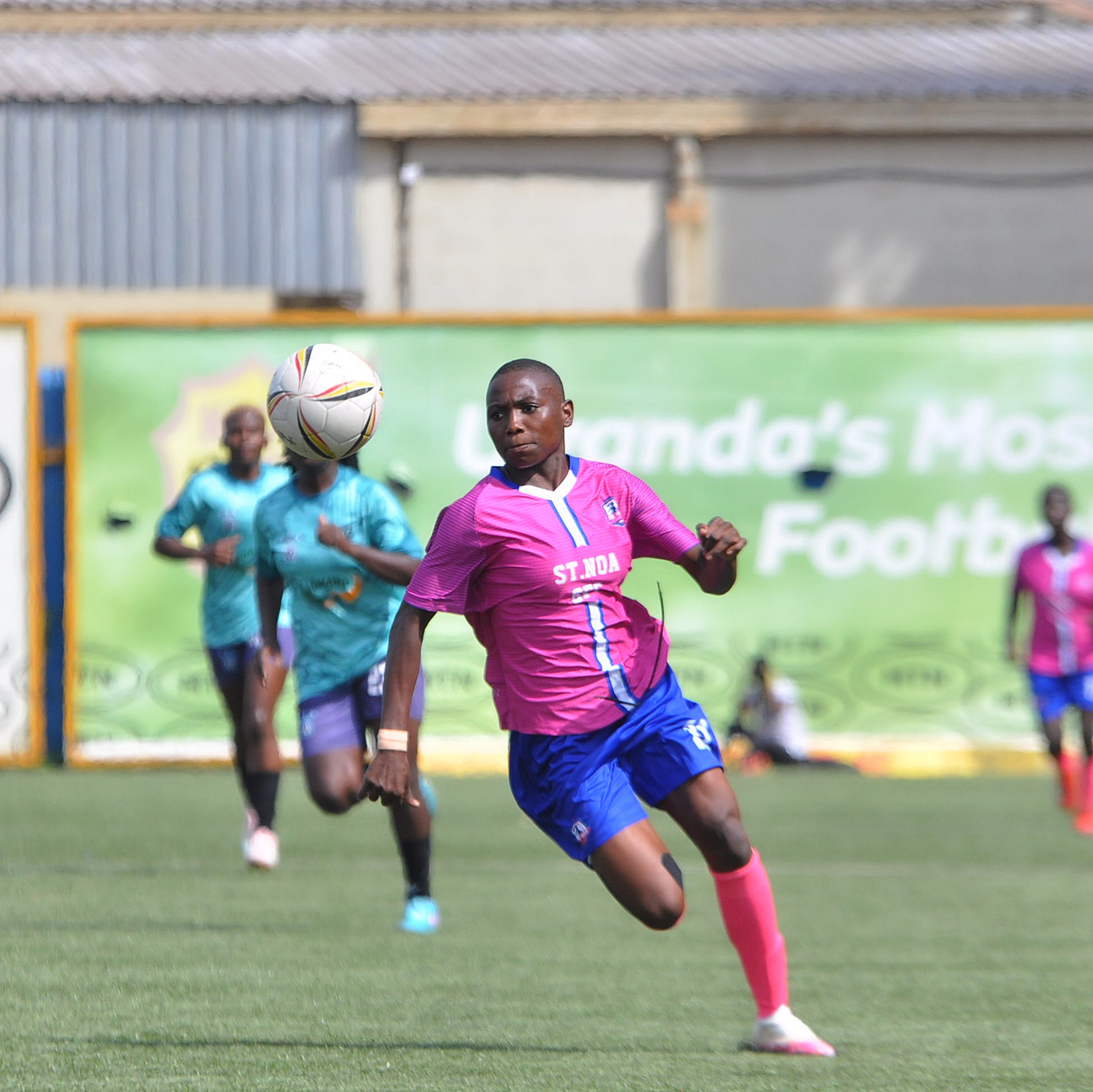

Personal information
- Date of birth: 3 May 2007 (age 19)
- Position: Forward

Team information
- Current team: Hibernians FC

International career^{‡}
Years	Team	Apps	(Gls)
–2024	Uganda U17	4	(2)
2024–	Uganda	6	(4)
- ‡ National team caps and goals as of 15 June 2025

Sylvia Kabene (born 3 May 2007) is an Ugandan professional footballer who plays as a forward for Hibernians FC in the Malta Women's Super League and the Uganda women's national team.

== Club career ==
While a student at St. Noa Girls School, Kabene played for the school's football team competing in the FUFA Women Elite League, where she attracted attention for her goalscoring ability across league matches, cup competitions, and the Fresh Dairy Games. Following the conclusion of the 2024–25 season, the young striker was named the league's Most Valuable Player after a standout campaign that played a key role in her club's title win and promotion to the Super League.

In September 2025, Kabene joined Hibernians FC in the Malta Women's Super League in Europe upon signing a two year contract.

== International career ==
At youth level, Kabene represented Uganda at the under-17 level, featuring in the 2024 African U-17 Women's World Cup qualifiers.

Kabene earned her first call-up to the senior national team in October 2024 for friendly matches against DR Congo. On 27 October 2024, she made her debut for the Crested Cranes, coming on as a substitute after the hour mark. She had an immediate impact, scoring her first international goal in the 77th minute to help Uganda regain the lead and secure the win. In June 2025, she was named in Uganda's final squad for the 2025 CECAFA Women's Championship in Chamazi. On 15 June 2025, she scored her first goals of the tournament, netting a hat-trick against South Sudan and earning the Player of the Match award in a 5–0 victory.

== Achievements ==
Kabene helped the Uganda Queen cranes to win Namibia in the FIFA U20 Women's World Cup qualifiers at Kadiba.

She helped St. Noa Girls Football Club to eliminate Kampala Queens from the 2025 FUFA Women’s Cup in a low margin of 3-2 win.

Kabene was named Most Valuable Player (MVP) in St. Noa Girls FC’s FUFA Women Elite League.

== Career statistics ==
As of 15 June 2025

Appearances and goals by national team and year
National team	Year	Apps	Goals
Uganda	2024	4	1
Uganda	2025	2	3
Total		6	4

Scores and results list Uganda's goal tally first, score column indicates score after each Kabene goal.

List of international goals scored by Sylvia Kabene
No.	Date	Venue	Opponent	Score	Result	Competition
1.	27 October 2024	Stade des Martyrs, Kinshasa, DR Congo	DR Congo	2–1	2–1	Friendly
2.	15 June 2025	Chamazi Stadium, Chamazi, Tanzania	South Sudan	1–0	5–0	2025 CECAFA Championship
3.	15 June 2025	Chamazi Stadium, Chamazi, Tanzania	South Sudan	4–0	5–0	2025 CECAFA Championship
4.	15 June 2025	Chamazi Stadium, Chamazi, Tanzania	South Sudan	5–0	5–0	2025 CECAFA Championship
