= Birtukan Gebrekristos =

Ethiopian footballer

Ambassador of Ethiopia to the United States

Personal details
- Profession: Footballer

Birtukan Gebrekristo is an Ethiopian female football player, she was a mid-field player, who has played for the Ethiopia women's national football team.

== Biography ==
Birtukan Gebrekristo as a female football player helped the Ethiopia finish WAFCON being fourth in the year 2004. Birtukan Gebrekristo as a mid-field female footballer has won several league trophies with Central College, Dedebit and Commercial Bank of Ethiopia.

In the year 2025, she retired from playing international leagues, while in 2026, she was called to play WAFCON but Birtukan Gebrekristo declined by saying that the offer should be giving to upcoming Female players.

== See also ==
- Ethiopia women's national football team
