= Ethiopia women's national football team =

Women's association football team

Ethiopia
- Nickname: Lucy
- Association: Ethiopian Football Federation (EFF)
- Confederation: CAF (Africa)
- Sub-confederation: CECAFA (East & Central Africa)
- Head coach: Frew Hailegbrael
- Most caps: Bizuhan
- Top scorer: Loza Abera (33)
- FIFA code: ETH
First colours	Second colours

FIFA ranking
- Current: 138 ▼1 (16 June 2026)
- Highest: 77 (July 2003)
- Lowest: 138 (December 2025)

First international
- Ethiopia 2–0 Uganda (Addis Ababa; 22 September 2002)

Biggest win
- Ethiopia 16–0 Seychelles (Addis Ababa; 30 September 2026)

Biggest defeat
- FIFA recognized Ivory Coast 5–0 Ethiopia (Bata, Equatorial Guinea; 29 October 2012); Unofficial; Nigeria U23 7–0 Ethiopia (Lagos, Nigeria; 9 October 2003)

Africa Women Cup of Nations
- Appearances: 3 (first in 2002)
- Best result: Fourth Place, 2004

The Ethiopia women's national football team (Amharic: የኢትዮጵያ ሴቶች ብሔራዊ እግር ኳስ ቡድን) represents Ethiopia in international women's football. They are overseen by the Ethiopian Football Federation. As of 12 June 2025, they are ranked 127th in the world.

== Team image ==
=== Nicknames ===
They are popularly known as "Lucy" in reference to the Australopithecus fossil.

== Results and fixtures ==
The following is a list of match results in the last 12 months, as well as any future matches that have been scheduled.

Legend

Win Draw Lose Fixture

=== 2025 ===
22 October 2025 2026 WAFCON qualifying	Tanzania	2–0	Ethiopia	Chamazi
17:00 UTC+3	Mnunka 7'; Mnunduka 54'	Report (FIFA)		Stadium: Azam Complex Stadium; Referee: Aminata Fullah (Sierra Leone)

28 October 2025 2026 WAFCON qualifying	Ethiopia	0–1	Tanzania	Addis Ababa
15:00 UTC+3		Report (FIFA)	Msewa 15'	Stadium: Abebe Bikila Stadium; Referee: Agnes Ngoma (Congo)
Note: Tanzania won 3–0 on aggregate.

=== 2026 ===
30 September International friendly	Ethiopia	16–0	Seychelles	Addis Ababa
3:00 p.m. EAT	Mihiret Ayele 22'; Turist Lema 24'; Milen Gayim 27'; Nigist Bekele 30', 43'; Etsegenet Girma 45'; Tarikuwa Debiso 45+2', 67'; Emush Daniel 47', 79'; Aregash Kalsa 60', 77'; Dagmawit Solomon 68'; Bethlehem Mentelo 76', 89'; Mahlet Mitiku 80'	Report		Stadium: Abebe Bikila Stadium; Referee: Emmanuela Akoo (South Sudan)

3 October International friendly	Ethiopia	10–0	Seychelles	Addis Ababa
3:00 p.m. EAT	Ashanta Mari 3' (o.g.); Emush Daniel 6', 15'; Bethlehem Bekele 7'; Dagmawit Solomon 22', 32', 57' (pen.); Bethlehem Mentelo 58'; Turist Lema 68'; Rediet Asresahegn 90'	Report		Stadium: Abebe Bikila Stadium; Referee: Emmanuela Akoo (South Sudan)

7 October 2028 Summer Olympic Qualifiers	Rwanda	0–1	Ethiopia	Kigali, Rwanda
7:00 p.m. EAT		Report	Uzayisenga 45+3' (o.g.)	Stadium: Kigali Pelé Stadium; Referee: Anaëlle Omanda (Gabon)

13 October 2028 Summer Olympic Qualifiers	Ethiopia	v	Rwanda	Dire Dawa
4:00 p.m. EAT				Stadium: Dire Dawa Stadium

== Coaching staff ==
=== Current coaching staff ===
As of October 2021

Position	Name	Ref.
Head coach	(Ethiopia) Yosef Gebrewold	

=== Manager history ===
- Abrham Haimanot
- Meseret Manne (2016–2017)
- (Ethiopia) Selam Zeray (????–2021)
- (Ethiopia) Birhanu Gizaw (2021–2022)
- (Ethiopia) Frew Hailegbrael( 2022–2024)
- (Ethiopia) Yosef Gebrewold(2024-)

== Players ==
=== Current squad ===
- The following players were called up for the 2026 WAFCON qualifying First Round match against Tanzania November 2025.
- Caps and goals accurate up to and including 30 October 2021.

No.	Pos.	Player	Date of birth (age)	Club
	GK	Tarikua Bargena	11 August 1996 (age 30)	(Ethiopian Football Federation) CBE
	GK	Betelhem Yohannes		(Ethiopian Football Federation) Hawassa
	GK	Roman Ambaye		(Ethiopian Football Federation) Diredawa
	DF	Hasabe Muso	27 March 1996 (age 30)	(Ethiopian Football Federation) CBE
	DF	Tarikuwa Debiso	17 February 2002 (age 24)	(Ethiopian Football Federation) CBE
	DF	Tigist Adane		(Ethiopian Football Federation) Hawassa
	DF	Tsehaynesh Julla		(Ethiopian Football Federation) Hawassa
	DF	Etsegenet Bizuneh		(Ethiopian Football Federation) Ethio Electric
	DF	Birke Amare		(Ethiopian Football Federation) Mechal
	DF	Mahider Bayeh		(Ethiopian Football Federation) Arbaminch
	DF	Tsega Nigussie		(Ethiopian Football Federation) Hawassa
	MF	Emebet Adisu	28 July 2001 (age 25)	(Ethiopian Football Federation) CBE
	MF	Senayt Bogale	6 May 1996 (age 30)	(Ethiopian Football Federation) CBE
	MF	Tsion Feyera		(Ethiopian Football Federation) Mechal
	MF	Meadin Sahilu		(Ethiopian Football Federation) Hawassa
	MF	Betelhem Mentelo		(Ethiopian Football Federation) Mechal
	MF	Etsegenet Girma	3 March 2004 (age 22)	(Ethiopian Football Federation) Hawassa
	MF	Mesay Temesgen	12 September 2004 (age 22)	(Tanzania Football Federation) Yanga Princess
	MF	Birtukan Gebrekristos	30 November 1988 (age 37)	(Ethiopian Football Federation) CBE
	MF	Zufan Defersha		(Ethiopian Football Federation) Ethio Electric
	MF	Simegn Mihrete		(Ethiopian Football Federation) Arbaminch
	FW	Loza Abera (Captain)	2 October 1997 (age 29)	(United States Soccer Federation) DC Power
	FW	Senaf Wakuma	23 September 1999 (age 27)	(Tanzania Football Federation) Simba
	FW	Aregash Kalsa	8 September 2003 (age 23)	(Tanzania Football Federation) Yanga Princess
	FW	Emush Daniel		(Ethiopian Football Federation) Hawassa
	FW	Ariet Odong		(Royal Moroccan Football Federation) RS Berkane
	FW	Mirkat Feleke		(Ethiopian Football Federation) Arbaminch
	FW	Nigist Bekele	26 September 2004 (age 22)	(Ethiopian Football Federation) CBE
	FW	Mahlet Mitiku		(Ethiopian Football Federation) Ethio Electric

=== Recent call-ups ===
The following players have been called up to an Ethiopia squad in the past 12 months.

Pos.	Player	Date of birth (age)	Caps	Goals	Club	Latest call-up

=== Previous squads ===
Africa Women Cup of Nations

- 2012 African Women's Championship squad

CECAFA Women's Championship

- 2022 CECAFA Women's Championship squads

== Records ==
- Active players in **bold**, statistics correct as of 2020.

=== Most capped players ===
#	Player	Year(s)	Caps
**1**	Bizuhan		

=== Top goalscorers ===
As of 25 October 2023

Rank	Player	Year(s)	Goals	Caps
**1**	Loza Abera	2018 -	23	30

== Competitive record ==
=== FIFA Women's World Cup ===
FIFA Women's World Cup record
Year	Result	Pld	W	D*	L	GS	GA	GD
(China) 1991	did not enter							
(Sweden) 1995	did not enter							
(United States) 1999	did not enter							
(United States) 2003	did not qualify							
(China) 2007	did not enter							
(Germany) 2011	did not qualify							
(Canada) 2015	did not qualify							
(France) 2019	did not qualify							
(Australia) (New Zealand) 2023	did not qualify							
(Brazil) 2027	did not qualify							
Total	0/10	0	0	0	0	0	0	0

*Draws include knockout matches decided on penalty kicks.

=== Olympic Games ===
Summer Olympics record
Year	Result	Pld	W	D*	L	GS	GA	GD
(United States) 1996	did not qualify							
(Australia) 2000	did not qualify							
(Greece) 2004	did not qualify							
(China) 2008	did not qualify							
(United Kingdom) 2012	did not qualify							
(Brazil) 2016	did not qualify							
(Japan) 2020	did not qualify							
(France) 2024	did not qualify							
Total	0/8	0	0	0	0	0	0	0

*Draws include knockout matches decided on penalty kicks.

=== Africa Women Cup of Nations ===
Africa Women Cup of Nations record
Year	Round	M	W	D	L	GF	GA
1991-1998	did not enter						
(South Africa) 2000	did not qualify						
(Nigeria) 2002	Group stage	3	0	1	2	2	8
(South Africa) 2004	**Fourth place**	5	1	2	2	4	8
2006-2008	did not enter						
(South Africa) 2010	did not qualify						
(Equatorial Guinea) 2012	Group stage	3	0	1	2	0	8
(Namibia) 2014	did not qualify						
(Cameroon) 2016	did not qualify						
(Ghana) 2018	did not qualify						
(Republic of the Congo) 2020	Cancelled due to covid						
(Morocco) 2022	did not qualify						
(Morocco) 2024	did not qualify						
(Morocco) 2026	did not qualify						
**Total**	3/14	11	1	4	6	6	24

=== African Games ===
African Games record
Year	Result	M	W	D	L	GF	GA
(Nigeria) 2003	Group Stage	3	0	0	3	0	15
(Algeria) 2007	Group Stage	2	0	0	2	1	6
(Mozambique) 2011	did not enter						
(Republic of the Congo) 2015	did not qualify						
(Morocco) 2019	See Ethiopia women's national under-20 football team						
(Ghana) 2023	See Ethiopia women's national under-20 football team						
Total	**2/4**	5	0	0	5	1	21

=== CECAFA Women's Championship ===
CECAFA Women's Championship
Year	Round	GP	W	D*	L	GS	GA	GD
(Zanzibar) 1986
(Uganda) 2016	**3rd**	4	2	1	1	9	5	+4
(Rwanda) 2018	**3rd**	4	2	0	2	6	6	0
(Tanzania) 2019	Group Stage	3	1	0	2	8	3	+5
(Djibouti) 2021	Cancelled							
(Uganda) 2022	**3rd**	5	3	1	1	13	4	+9
**Total**	4/5	16	8	2	6	36	18	18

At the 2022 CECAFA Senior Women's Championship, Ethiopia opened its campaign with a 5–0 victory over Zanzibar.

== Honours ==
=== Regional ===
- **CECAFA Women's Championship**

== See also ==
- Sport in Ethiopia
  - Football in Ethiopia
    - Women's football in Ethiopia
- Ethiopia women's national under-20 football team
- Ethiopia women's national under-17 football team
- Ethiopia men's national football team
