= Oscar Mirambo =

Tanzanian association football manager

Personal information
- Place of birth: Tanzania

Managerial career
- Years: Team
- 2019-: Tanzania U17
- 2022-: Tanzania Women's team

Oscar Mirambo is a professional Tanzanian association football manager who is the current head coach of the Tanzania national under-17 football team and Tanzania women's national football team.
