= CECAFA Women's Championship =

- Founded: 2016
- Region: Eastern Africa (CECAFA)
- Current champions: Tanzania (3rd title)
- Most championships: Tanzania (3 titles)
- Website: Official website
- 2025 CECAFA Women's Championship

The CECAFA Women's Championship, also called Women's Challenge Cup, is an association football tournament for teams from Eastern Africa organized by Council for East and Central Africa Football Associations (CECAFA).

== History ==
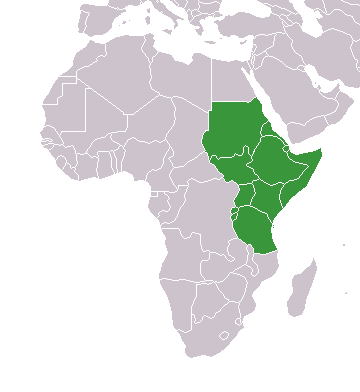
CECAFA members

The first tournament was played in Zanzibar in 1986 and won by the host team. After that there was no tournament for the next thirty years. The try for reviving the women's championship in the CECAFA region had been attempted in Zanzibar for October 2007. But the tournament was cancelled and never played. The next edition then was proposed for 2016.

That 2016 edition was hosted by Uganda and played in Jinja. There were no other bids to host the tournament. Tanzania won the championship and also Burundi were playing their first official FIFA recognized games ever.

The 2018 edition was again won by Tanzania.

== Results ==
Editions	Years	Hosts	Finals			Third place playoff			Number of teams
Editions	Years	Hosts	Winners	Scores	Runners-up	Third place	Score	Fourth place	
X	1986	Zanzibar	Zanzibar						?
1	2016	Uganda	Tanzania	2–1	Kenya	Ethiopia	4–1	Uganda	7
2	2018	Rwanda	Tanzania	round-robin	Uganda	Ethiopia	round-robin	Kenya	5
3	2019	Tanzania	Kenya	2–0	Tanzania	Uganda	2–0	Burundi	8
~~4~~	2021	Djibouti	Cancelled due to reconstruction of the stadium						8
5	2022	Uganda	Uganda	3–1	Burundi	Ethiopia	2–1	Tanzania	8
6	2025	Tanzania	Tanzania	round-robin	Kenya	Uganda	round-robin	Burundi	5

== Participating nations ==
Legend

- 1st – Champions
- 2nd – Runners-up
- 3rd – Third place
- 4th – Fourth place
- SF – Losing semi-finals
- QF – Quarter-finals
- GS – Group stage
- Q — Qualified for upcoming tournament
- • – Did not qualify
- × – Did not enter
- × – Withdrew / Banned / Entry not accepted by FIFA
- XX — National Team did not exist
- – Hosts

Team	(Zanzibar) 1986	(Uganda) 2016	(Rwanda) 2018	(Tanzania) 2019	(Uganda) 2022	Years
Ethiopia		3rd	3rd	GS	3rd	4
Kenya		2nd	4th	1st	×	3
Tanzania		1st	1st	2nd	4th	4
Uganda		4th	2nd	3rd	1st	4
Rwanda		GS	5th	×	GS	3
Burundi		GS	×	4th	2nd	3
Zanzibar	1st	GS	×	GS	GS	4
Sudan					×	0
Djibouti		×	×	GS	GS	2
South Sudan				GS	GS	2
Eritrea		×	×	×	×	0
Somalia						0
Total (12 Teams)	?	7	5	8	8	8

== See also ==
- CECAFA Cup
