= Peace Olga Niyomwungere =

Burundian footballer (born 2005)

Personal information
- Date of birth: 20 December 2005 (age 20)
- Place of birth: Burundi
- Position: Midfielder

Team information
- Current team: Shan United

Senior career*
Years	Team	Apps	(Gls)
- La Colombe
- AS Kigali
- Rayon Sports
2026–	Shan United		

International career
- Burundi U17
- Burundi U20
- Burundi
- * Club domestic league appearances and goals

Peace Olga Niyomwungere (born 20 December 2005) is a Burundian professional footballer who plays as a midfielder for Shan United.

== Early life ==
Niyomwungere was born on 20 December 2005 in Burundi. Nicknamed "Black Ninja", she has four brothers.

Growing up, she attended Lycée Municipal de Kanyosha in Burundi. Initially, her parents were against her playing football as a woman.

== Club career ==
Niyomwungere started her career with La Colombe, where she captained the club. Following her stint there, she signed for Rwandan side AS Kigali, helping the club win the league title.

Subsequently, she signed for Rayon Sports in Rwanda. In 2026, she signed for Burmese outfit Shan United after the club received criticism from supporters for not signing foreign players ahead of the 2026–27 season.

== International career ==
Niyomwungere is a Burundi international and has represented and captained the country internationally at under-17, under-20 and senior level.

During February 2022, she played for the Burundi women's national football team for 2022 Women's Africa Cup of Nations qualification. The same year, she played for the Burundi women's national football team at the 2022 Women's Africa Cup of Nations.
