= Makerere University WFC =

Makerere University WFC is a Ugandan women's football club competing in the FUFA Women Super League. The club is based in Kampala city.

== History ==
Makerere University WFC won the FUFA Women's Cup in the season of 2018 - 2019. They defeated Lady Doves FC 2-0 in the final that took place at the StarTimes Stadium Lugogo on 8 June 2019.

== Honours ==
Type	Competition	Titles	Winning Seasons	Runners-up
Domestic	FUFA Women's Cup	1	2019	
