= Zanzibar women's national football team =

Women's national association football team representing Zanzibar

Zanzibar
- Nickname: Zanzibar Queens
- Association: Zanzibar Football Association
- Confederation: CAF (associate member); Zone 5, CECAFA
- FIFA code: ZAN

First international
- Zanzibar 1–10 Burundi (Jinja, Uganda; 11 September 2016)

Biggest win
- None

Biggest defeat
- Tanzania 12–0 Zanzibar (Njeru, Uganda; 6 June 2022)

The Zanzibar women's national football team, nicknamed the "Zanzibar Queens", is the women's representative team from Zanzibar, a semi-autonomous part of Tanzania. Founded in 1988, the team has limited recognition as the regional governing body, the Zanzibar Football Association, is a full member of the Council for East and Central Africa Football Associations (CECAFA) and Confederation of African Football (CAF), but Zanzibar Football Association is not recognised by Fédération Internationale de Football Association (FIFA) as an independent national association. The national team was supposed to have its first international matches in the CECAFA Women's Challenge Cup in October 2007, but the event was cancelled. The team plays domestically against men's sides in Zanzibar. The development of women's football in Zanzibar faces several challenges specific to Africa and their own islands, including efforts to politicize the game.

== Background and development of women's football ==
Zanzibar is a territory consisting of two main islands, Unguja/Zanzibar and Pemba, and is a semi-autonomous part of Tanzania with its own government. As of the 2002 census, it had a total population of 984,625. Women's football in Africa has not developed compared to elsewhere because of a variety of factors, including limited access to education, poverty amongst women in the wider society, and fundamental inequality present in the society that occasionally allows for female specific human rights abuses. Another problem with the development of the game throughout the continent is that higher ability players leave to play in Europe or the United States. According to Kuhn, funding for the game on a regional level is problematic as national associations do not fund the women's game adequately.

Zanzibar has unique problems relating to the development of the women's game including pressures for female players to wear the hijab while playing and pressure from male family members not to participate as their involvement may bring shame to the family. There is minimal support for the game at schools, with the national federation not responding to requests from the national team coach to work harder to get girls to play the sport in school. A national women's league was created in 2004 after a 26-year effort. Five teams competed in the inaugural season: Women Fighters, Nyuki FC, Koani Sisters, Bungi Sisters and Policewomen FC. Women Fighters won the first two editions of the league, however, the league has since collapsed.

== Team ==
Founded in 1988 by Nassra Juma Mohammed of Tanzania, the Women Fighters was Zanzibar's first women's football club, upon which the national team was built, and the team was created at a time when there were very few women's national teams in existence. Prior to 1988, women had played informally or on men's only teams; several of these players, as well as those from other sports, including badminton, made up the inaugural team. The team soon played a game against the touring Swedish women's club side, Tyresö FF in Zanzibar's largest football stadium, losing the game 0–15 at Amaan Stadium. At the time the team was created, there were few opportunities for it to compete against other women's teams in Zanzibar, but they have played and sometimes beaten men's teams in Zanzibar while receiving support from the Zanzibar Football Association and Zanzibar's Ministry of Sport. The players do not wear a hijab or cover up as part of their kit, which has led to criticism from religious leaders for playing in public while wearing shorts and jersey tops, instead of covering their bodies according to Muslim custom. The team trains in Stone Town at the Mao Tse Tung Stadium. Player recruitment and retention has been a problem because some members of the national team have been prohibited from playing by their husbands or family members. Male relatives of the Fighters team have beaten players because they "disgrace them". National team players are eligible to play for Tanzania in all competitions. Aziza Mwadini and Sabai Yusuf are two Zanzibar based players who have participated in a Tanzanian national team training camp. As of 2011, Mohammed remained the team's head coach.

The national association, founded in 1926, is recognised by the Council for East and Central Africa Football Associations (CECAFA), but not by Fédération Internationale de Football Association (FIFA) despite repeated attempts for such recognition. However, it became a member of CAF in 2017, after previously being an associate member, and plans to re-apply for FIFA membership, which it last did unsuccessfully in 2005.

Zanzibar were meant to play in the inaugural CECAFA Women's Challenge Cup in October 2007, but the tournament was ultimately cancelled because of an inability to attain funding from CECAFA to cover costs connected to the competition. The competition was to have been jointly funded by CAF and CECAFA. The CECAFA secretary, Nicholas Musonye said of the event, "CAF wants to develop women football in this region in recognition of the milestones CECAFA has achieved over the years. CAF appreciates what CECAFA has done despite the hardships the association has gone through, from financial problems to political instability in member states and poor management of associations. Member states in the CECAFA region have not taken women's football seriously. CAF now wants to sponsor a long-term campaign to attract women from this region into the game." CECAFA, after many false starts, eventually staged the first ever CECAFA Women's Championship in 2016 in Uganda, and Zanzibar were one of seven participating teams. They lost all 3 group games, scoring just 1 goal and conceding 30.

In 2007, a movie was made about the team called Zanzibar Soccer Queens. The film was featured at the BFI London Film Festival in 2007.

== Results and fixtures ==
The following is a list of match results in the last 12 months, as well as any future matches that have been scheduled.

Win Draw Lose Fixture

== See also ==
- Football in Zanzibar
