= Shamirah Nalugya =

Ugandan footballer (born 2003)

Personal information
- Date of birth: 12 September 2003 (age 23)
- Position: Attacking midfielder

Team information
- Current team: FC Dynamo Brest
- Number: 15

Senior career*
Years	Team	Apps	(Gls)
- Kawempe Muslim Ladies
- Kampala Queens FC

International career^{‡}
2021–	Uganda	33	(8)
- * Club domestic league appearances and goals ‡ National team caps and goals as of 26 October 2021.

Shamirah Nalugya (born 12 September 2003) is a Ugandan footballer who plays as an attacking midfielder for BELARUSIAN Women Super League Football club Dynamo Brest and the Uganda women's national team.

== Early life ==
Nalugya was raised in Bweyogerere and belongs to the Baganda.

== Club career ==
Nalugya has played for Isra soccer academy, Kawempe Muslims WL, Kampala queens, Fc Minsk women and currently in FC Dynamo Brest in BELARUS.

== International career ==
Nalugya made her senior national team debut at the 2018 COSAFA Women's Championship as Uganda defeated Eswatini 4-3 in South Africa.

Nalugya capped for Uganda at senior level during the 2022 Africa Women Cup of Nations qualification.

=== International goals ===
Scores and results list Uganda goal tally first

No.	Date	Venue	Opponent	Score	Result	Competition
1	25 November 2019	Chamazi Stadium, Mbagala, Tanzania	Burundi	2–0	2–0	2019 CECAFA Women's Championship
