= Rukiya Bizimana =

Burundian footballer (born 2006)

Personal information
- Date of birth: 23 March 2006 (age 20)
- Height: 1.60 m (5 ft 3 in)
- Position: Forward

Team information
- Current team: Etoile du matin
- Number: 10

Senior career*
Years	Team	Apps	(Gls)
2018	Etoile du matin	28	(53)
2024	Rayon sport wfc	32	(24)
2025	Police wfc	3	(3)

International career^{‡}
2021–	Burundi	2	(4)
- * Club domestic league appearances and goals ‡ National team caps and goals as of 21 February 2022.

Rukiya Bizimana (born 23 March 2006) is a Burundian footballer who plays as a forward for Etoile du matin and Burundi women's national team.

== International career ==
In February 2022, Bizimana scored four goals in their 11–1 aggregate victory over Djibouti which qualified them to the 2022 African Women Cup of Nations, their first African Women's Cup of Nations tournament.
