= CECAFA =

Football organisation in East Africa

Council for East and Central Africa Football Associations Baraza la Mashirikisho ya Mpira wa Miguu Afrika Mashariki na Kati Conseil des Associations de Football d'Afrique de l'Est et Centrale مؤتمر جمعيات شرق ووسط أفريقيا لكرة القدم የምስራቅ እና መካከለኛው አፍሪካ እግር ኳስ ማህበራት ምክር ቤት Guddiga Kubadda Cagta Bariga iyo Bartamaha Afrika

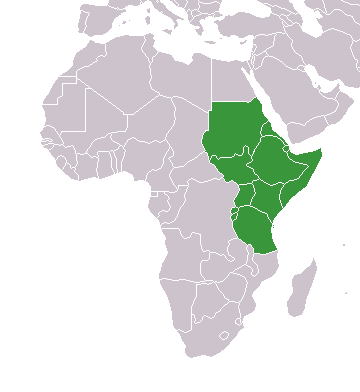
- CECAFA members
- Formation: 1927 (unofficial); 1973 (official)
- Type: CAF regional subconfederation
- Headquarters: Nairobi, Kenya
- Region served: East Africa; Horn of Africa
- Members: 12 members: Uganda; Ethiopia; Kenya; Sudan; Tanzania; Burundi; Djibouti; Somalia; Eritrea; Rwanda; South Sudan; Zanzibar
- Official language: Swahili, English, French
- President: Eritrea Paulos Weldehaimanot
- Affiliations: CAF, FIFA
- Website: www.cecafaonline.com

The Council for East and Central Africa Football Associations (Swahili: Baraza la Mashirikisho ya Mpira wa Miguu Afrika Mashariki na Kati, French: Conseil des Associations de Football d'Afrique de l'Est et Centrale, Arabic: مؤتمر جمعيات شرق ووسط أفريقيا لكرة القدم, Amharic: የምስራቅ እና መካከለኗኛሙ አፍሪካ እግር ኳስ ማህበራት ምክር ቤት, Somali: Guddiga Kubadda Cagta Bariga iyo Bartamaha Afrika,Tigrinya: ቤት ምኽሪ ማሕበራት ኩዕሶ እግሪ ምብራቕን ማእከላይን ኣፍሪቃ), also known by its acronym CECAFA, is a regional subconfederation affiliated with CAF and the governing body for football in East Africa that includes the Horn of Africa and small parts of Central Africa. Formed unofficially in 1927, it is the oldest regional football organization on the continent; however, CECAFA was officially established in 1973.

The CECAFA organises competitions for men's and women's national teams and clubs in the Eastern African region, its premier competitions for national teams are the CECAFA Cup and the CECAFA Women's Championship. Its premier club competition is the Kagame Interclub Cup.

== CECAFA Address/Location ==
- No 209/4987 Amber House Ground Floor, Tom Mboya Street, Nairobi, Kenya, East Africa

== History ==
The competition that would later evolve into CECAFA began in 1926 with the establishment of an annual match known as the Gossage Cup, making it the oldest international football tournament in Africa. The first recorded contest took place that year, with Kenya emerging victorious over Uganda in a replay after the initial match ended in a draw.

CECAFA was founded unofficially in 1927. The competition was sponsored by the major Nairobi-based soap-manufacturing firm Gossage, owned by the British Lever Brothers. Its formation is often misattributed to William Gossage, founder of the Gossage company. However, he died 50 years before the CECAFA was established.

Tanganyika (present-day mainland Tanzania) joined in 1945, and Zanzibar followed in 1949, expanding the field to four participating teams over time.

The tournament was known as the "Gossage Cup" until the 1960s, when it was redubbed the "East African Challenge Cup". This version of the tournament continued until 1971, after which the competition was reconstituted under the banner of the CECAFA Senior Challenge Cup. The organizational body was formally established as a regional football association in 1973.

CECAFA's head offices are in Nairobi, Kenya, under the governance of the Council, which is affiliated with both CAF and FIFA.

== Member associations ==
All associations that joined in 1973 were founding members of CECAFA.

Country	Year	Governing body
Uganda	1973	Federation of Uganda Football Associations
Sudan*	1975	Sudan Football Association
Ethiopia	1983	Ethiopian Football Federation
Kenya	1973	Football Kenya Federation
Tanzania	1973	Tanzania Football Federation
Djibouti*	1994	Djiboutian Football Federation
Eritrea	1994	Eritrean National Football Federation
Rwanda	1995	Rwandese Association Football Federation
Somalia*	1973	Somali Football Federation
Burundi	1998	Football Federation of Burundi
South Sudan	2012	South Sudan Football Association
Zanzibar	1973	Zanzibar Football Association

* Union of Arab Football Associations (UAFA) members are marked with an asterisk

== Broadcasting rights ==
In 2007, television rights for the tournament were sold to GTV. Since 2009, broadcasting of CECAFA competitions has been taken over by South Africa broadcaster SuperSport

- Uganda NBS Sports
- Kenya Pro Soccer tv
- Ethiopia Shega Sports
- Tanzania Azam Tv
- Somalia Astaan Sports
- Sudan Sudan sport

== Kit Manufacturing ==
- Uganda Umbro
- Kenya Joma
- Ethiopia Adidas
- Tanzania Sandaland
- Somalia AZ sports
- Sudan Adidas

== Competitions ==
=== Current title holders ===
Competition	Edition	Champions	Title	Runners-up	Next edition	Dates
Men's national teams
Senior Challenge Cup	2019	Uganda	40°	Eritrea	TBD	
U-23 Challenge Cup	2021	Tanzania	1°	Burundi	TBD	
U-20 Championship	2024	Tanzania	3°	Kenya	TBD	
U-18 Championship	2023	Uganda	1°	Kenya	TBD	
U-17 Championship	2025	Tanzania	2°	Uganda	TBD	
U-15 Championship	2023	Zanzibar	1°	Uganda		
CECAFA African School Championship	2023	(Uganda) Royal Giants High School	1°	(Ethiopia) Geda Roble SS	2024	
CECAFA Beach Soccer Championship				2025		
Women's national teams
Women's Championship	2025	Tanzania	3rd	Kenya	TBD	
U-20 Women's Championship	2021	Ethiopia	1st	Uganda	TBD	
U-18 Women's Championship	2023	Tanzania	1st	Uganda	TBD	
U-17 Women's Championship	2019	Uganda	1st	Tanzania	2026	13–23 June
Girls Schools Championship	2023	(Tanzania) FT Fountain Gate	1st	(Ethiopia) Awaro SS	TBD	
Men's club teams
Kagame Cup	2024	(Zambia) Red Arrows	1°	(Rwanda) APR FC	TBD	
Women's club teams
CAF Women's Champions League CECAFA qualifiers	2024	(Ethiopia) CBE F.C.	1st	Kenya Police Bullets	2025	

== Rankings ==
=== Football ===
FIFA Rankings (as of 7 October 2026)
CECAFA*	FIFA	+/−	National Team	Points
1	87	▲2	Uganda	1278.26
2	114	▼5	Kenya	1168.67
3	115	▼3	Tanzania	1166.82
4	118	▼1	Sudan	1156.74
5	119	▲9	Rwanda	1156.16
6	140	▲2	Burundi	1076.75
7	147	▼4	Ethiopia	1064.46
8	170	▼1	South Sudan	959.91
9	183	▲1	Eritrea	890.97
10	195	▲1	Djibouti	853.58
11	200	▼1	Somalia	832.14

FIFA Rankings (as of 20 October 2026)
CECAFA*	FIFA	+/−	National Team	Points
1	111	▲11	Tanzania	1164.03
2	128	Steady	Kenya	1106.41
3	140	▼2	Ethiopia	1066.87
4	143	▲2	Uganda	1063.6
5	169	Steady	Rwanda	897.44
6	180	▼1	Burundi	822.1
7	194	Steady	Sudan	628.74
8	195	Steady	South Sudan	628.66
9	197	Steady	Djibouti	556.64

=== Futsal ===
FIFA Rankings (as of 24 September 2026)
CECAFA*	FIFA	+/−	National Team	Points
1	125	Steady	Somalia	816.42
2	137	▼3	Tanzania	737.22
3	143	Steady	Kenya	670.38

FIFA Rankings (as of 24 September 2026)
CECAFA*	FIFA	+/−	National Team	Points
1	73	Steady	Tanzania	797.7

=== Beach Soccer ===
BSWW Rankings (as of 2 September 2026)
CECAFA*	BSWW	+/−	National Team	Points
1	52	▼8	Tanzania	155
2	79	▲1	Uganda	46.25
3	80	▼7	Kenya	36.25

== See also ==
- Confederation of African Football (CAF)
- FIFA
