= Chamazi =

Ward of Dar es Salaam Region, Tanzania

Chamazi Kata ya Chamazi (Swahili)
- Ward of Temeke District
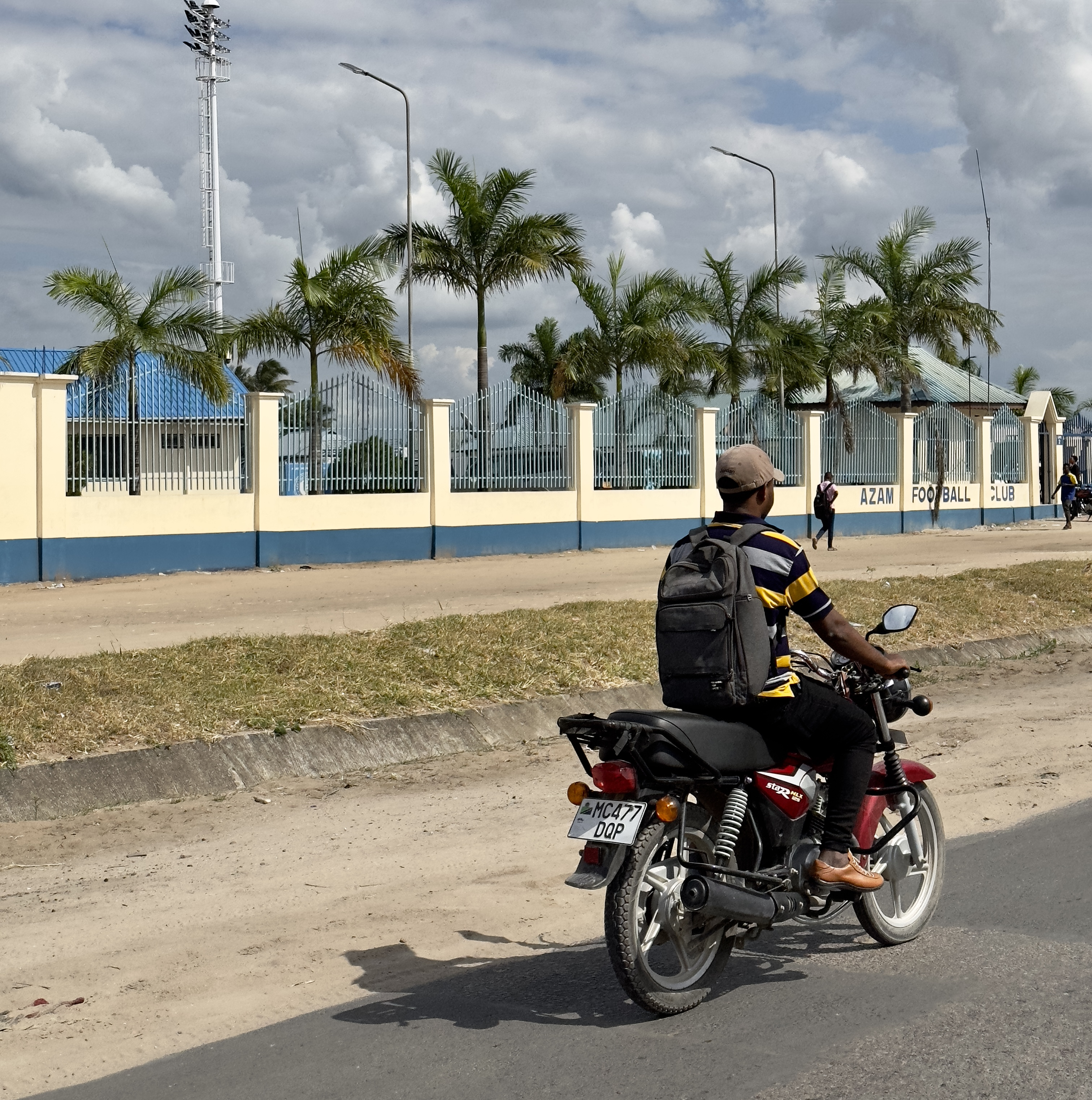
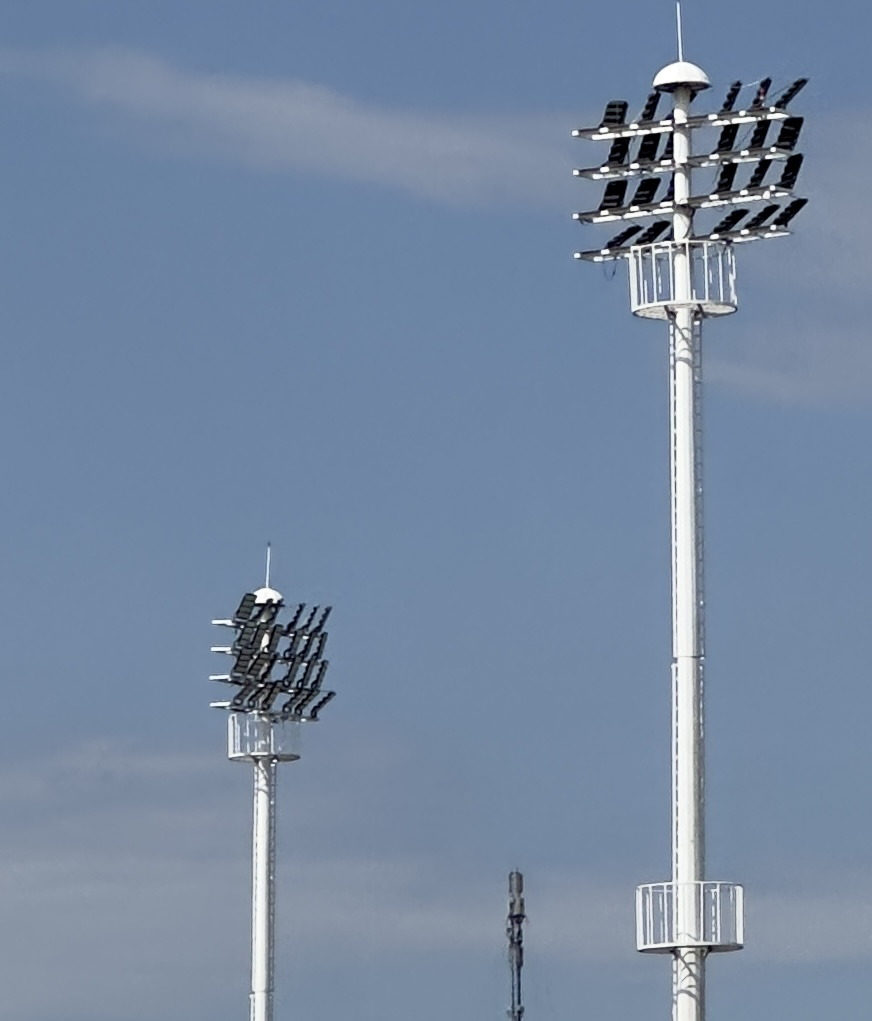
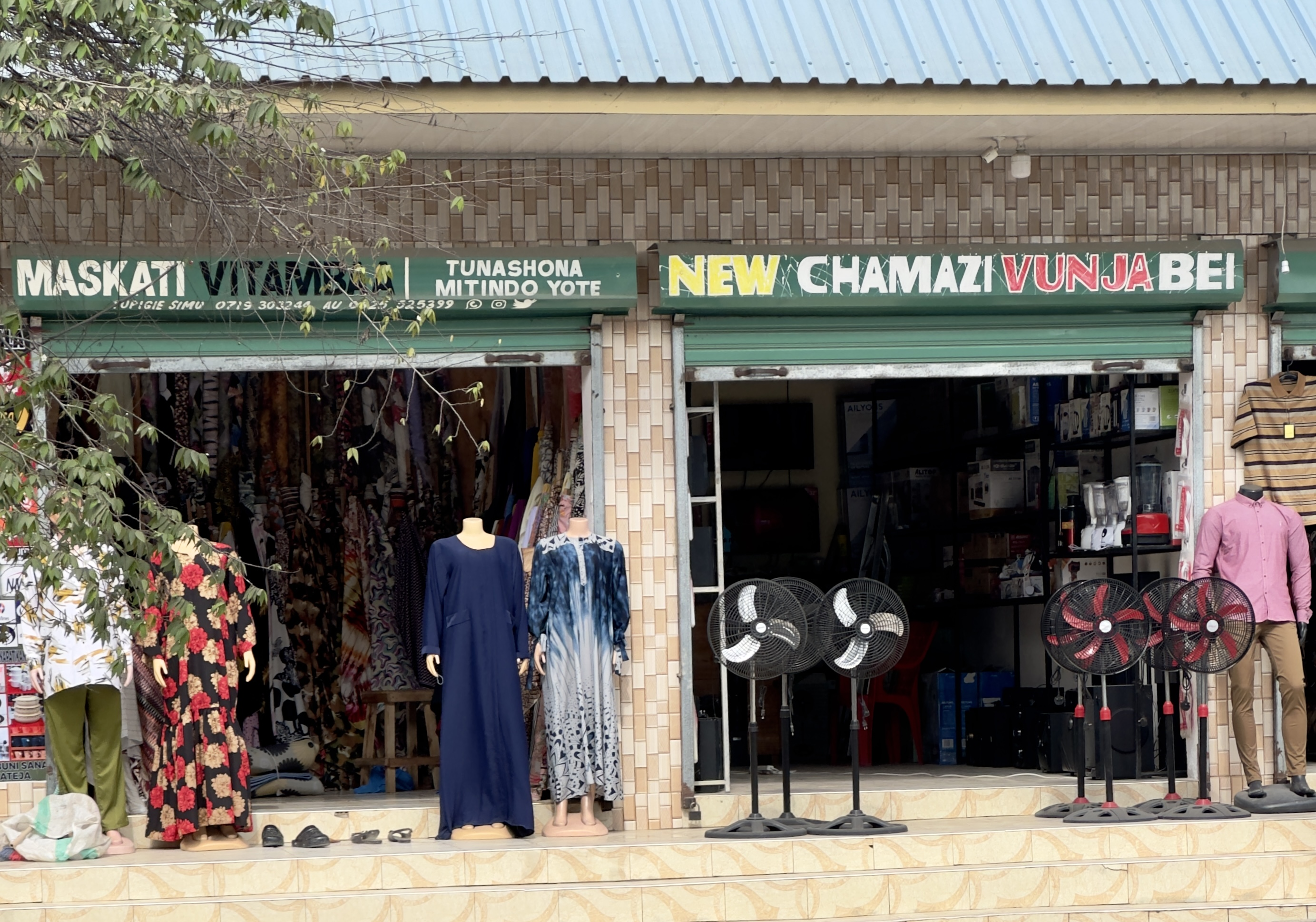
- From top to bottom: Scene in Chamzi outside Azam Complex, Stadium Lights at The Chamazi Stadium in Chamazi & Shops in Chamazi ward
- Interactive map of Chamazi
- Coordinates: 6°56′52.8″S 39°13′45.48″E
- Country: Tanzania
- Region: Dar es Salaam Region
- District: Temeke District

Area
  - Total: 27.1 km^{2} (10.5 sq mi)

Population (2012)
  - Total: 63,650

Ethnic groups
  - Settler: Swahili
  - Ancestral: Zaramo
- Tanzanian Postal Code: 15116

Chamazi (Kata ya Chamazi, in Swahili) is an administrative ward in the Temeke district of the Dar es Salaam Region of Tanzania. The Kitunda, Kivule, and Msongola wards of Ilala MC's form the western border of the ward. Mianzini and Charambe are to the north. Tambani ward in Pwani Region's Mkuranga District is to the south and east. The ward is home to the Azam Football Club and the Chamazi Stadium. According to the 2012 census, the ward has a total population of 63,650.

== Administration ==
The postal code for Chamazi Ward is 15116. The ward is divided into the following neighborhoods (Mitaa):

- Dovya
- Kipoza
- Kisewe
- Magengeni, Chamazi
- Mkondogwa

- Msufini
- Mwembebamia
- Rufu
- Vigoa

=== Government ===
Like every other ward in the country, the ward has local government offices based on the population served. The Chamazi Ward administration building houses a court as per the Ward Tribunal Act of 1988, including other vital departments for the administration of the ward. The ward has the following administration offices:

- Chamazi Police Station (Kituo cha Polisi)
- Chamazi Government Office ( Ofisi ya Afisa Mtendaji wa Kata)
- Chamazi Tribunal (Baraza La Kata) is a Department inside Ward Government Office

In the local government system of Tanzania, the ward is the smallest democratic unit. Each ward comprises a committee of eight elected council members, including a chairperson, one salaried officer (with no voting rights), and an executive officer. One-third of seats are reserved for women councilors.

== Demographics ==
The ward serves as the Zaramo people's ancestral home, along with much of the district. As the city developed over time, the ward became a cosmopolitan ward with a population of 63,650 as of 2012.

== Education and health ==
=== Education ===
The ward is home to these educational institutions:

- Chamazi Primary School
- Rufu Primary School
- Shalom Mission Primary School
- Yalamalam Primary School
- Saku Primary School
- Dynamic Primary School
- Salaam Primary School
- Chamazi Islamic Primary School
- Mkombozi Primary School
- Pacific Primary School, Chamazi
- Chamazi Secondary School
- Mbande Secondary School
- Upeo Islamic Secondary School
- Chem-Bande Secondary School
- Chamazi Islamic Secondary School
- St. Emmanuel Secondary School
- Kent Secondary School, Chamazi
- Epiphany Secondary School, Chamazi
- Debrabant Secondary School

=== Healthcare ===
The ward is home to the following health institutions:

- Medichecks Polyclinic, Chamazi
- Zango Health Center
- Hekima Health Center, Chamazi
- Ansa Health Center
- Alves Health Center, Chamazi
- Family Health Center, Chamazi
