= Togo women's national football team results =

National sports team

The Togo women's national football team is the representative women's association football team of Togo. Its governing body is the Togolese Football Federation (FTF) and it competes as a member of the Confederation of African Football (CAF).

The national team initiated its participation in the international stage in 2006, engaging in the 2006 African Women's Championship qualification. During this qualification phase, the team's inaugural match was against São Tomé and Príncipe, resulting in victories in both legs with an aggregate score of 9–0 (3–0 in the 1st leg and 6–0 in the 2nd leg). In the second round of qualification, Togo faced Congo-Brazzaville, experiencing a significant setback by losing the first match 9–0, marking their largest defeat to date. The second leg concluded with a 1–3 loss. Togo is currently ranked 120th in the FIFA Women's World Rankings.

== Record per opponent ==
Key

Positive balance (more wins than losses)
Neutral balance (as many wins as losses)
Negative balance (more losses than wins)

The following table shows Togo' all-time official international record per opponent:

Opponent	Pld	W	D	L	GF	GA	GD	W%	Confederation
Benin	4	2	1	1	6	5	+1	50.00	CAF
Botswana	1	0	1	0	1	1	0	00.00	CAF
Cameroon	1	0	1	0	1	1	0	00.00	CAF
Congo	2	0	0	2	1	12	−11	00.00	CAF
Djibouti	2	2	0	0	13	0	+13	100.00	CAF
Gabon	2	2	0	0	4	2	+2	100.00	CAF
Ghana	2	0	0	2	1	10	−9	00.00	CAF
Ivory Coast	2	0	0	2	0	10	−10	00.00	CAF
Mali	1	0	0	1	0	8	−8	00.00	CAF
Nigeria	1	0	0	1	1	3	−2	00.00	CAF
São Tomé and Príncipe	3	3	0	0	14	0	+14	100.00	CAF
Senegal	2	1	0	1	2	7	−5	50.00	CAF
Tunisia	1	0	0	1	1	4	−3	00.00	CAF
Zambia	1	0	0	1	1	4	−3	00.00	CAF
Total	25	10	3	12	46	67	−21	40.00	—

== Results ==
=== 2006 ===
19 February 2006 2006 AWCQ	São Tomé and Príncipe	0–3	Togo	São Tomé and Príncipe

26 February 2006 2006 AWCQ	Togo	6–0	São Tomé and Príncipe	Togo

12 March 2006 2006 AWCQ	Congo	9–0	Togo	Brazzaville, Congo

26 March 2006 2006 AWCQ	Togo	1–3	Congo	Lomé, Togo

=== 2007 ===
5 September 2007 2007 Tournoi de Cinq Nations	Ivory Coast	5–0	Togo	Ouagadougou, Burkina Faso

=== 2018 ===
15 February 2018 2018 WAFU Women's Cup	Senegal	6–0	Togo	Abidjan, Ivory Coast
17:30	Ngom 7'; Diedhiou 12', 32'; Sagna 28'; Diop 51'; Ndeye 72'	Report		Stadium: Stade Félix Houphouët-Boigny; Referee: Sonia Koré (Ivory Coast)

17 February 2018 2018 WAFU Women's Cup	Mali	8–0	Togo	Abidjan, Ivory Coast
20:00	Touré (?), 55'; F. Diarra (?); A. Diarra (?); Traoré (?); Tangara (?); S. Diarra 82'	Report		Stadium: Stade Robert Champroux

19 February 2018 2018 WAFU Women's Cup	Nigeria	3–1	Togo	Abidjan, Ivory Coast
17:30	Anam 40'; Uchendu 49'; Wogu 75'	Report	Woedikou 80' (pen.)	Stadium: Stade Robert Champroux

=== 2019 ===
8 May 2019 2019 WAFU Zone B Women's Cup Group A	Ivory Coast	5–0	Togo	Abidjan, Ivory Coast
--:-- UTC+0	Tokpoledo 9' (pen.); Diakité 26'; Agbo 33'; N'Guessan 52'; Kouadio 90+3'	Report

10 May 2019 2019 WAFU Zone B Women's Cup Group A	Ghana	6–0	Togo	Abidjan, Ivory Coast
--:-- UTC+0	Abdulai (??); A. Owusu (??); Asantewaa (??); M. Owusu (??)

13 May 2019 2019 WAFU Zone B Women's Cup Group A	Senegal	1–2	Togo	Abidjan, Ivory Coast
--:-- UTC+0			Woedikou (??)

8 September 2019 Friendly	Ghana	4–1	Togo	Accra, Ghana
--:-- UTC+1	Amfobea 31', 45' (pen.); 47'; 90+2'	Report	Adinda-Akpo 85'

23 December 2019 Friendly	Togo	2–1	Benin	Lomé, Togo
--:-- UTC+1	Gnintegma (??); Sama (??)	Report		Stadium: Stade de Kégué

26 December 2019 Friendly	Togo	1–1	Benin	Lomé, Togo
--:-- UTC+1	Sama (?)	Report		Stadium: Stade de Kégué

=== 2021 ===
18 October 2021 2022 AFWCON qualification First round 1st leg	São Tomé and Príncipe	0–5	Togo	São Tomé, São Tomé and Príncipe
13:00 UTC+0		Report	Gnintegma 2', 65', 68'; Woedikou 17'; Konou 71' (pen.)	Stadium: Estádio Nacional 12 de Julho

=== 2022 ===
14 January 2022 Friendly	Togo	0–2	Benin	Lomé, Togo
--:-- UTC+1				Stadium: Stade de Kégué

14 February 2022 2022 AFWCON qualification Second round first leg	Togo	2–1	Gabon	Lomé, Togo
15:00 UTC+0	Gake 29'; Gnintegma 90'	Report	Obiang 59'	Stadium: Stade de Kégué; Referee: Aurore Ligan (Benin)

23 February 2022 2022 AFWCON qualification Second round 2nd leg	Gabon	1–2 (2–4 agg.)	Togo	Libreville, Gabon
15:30 UTC+1	Obiang 63'	Report	Sama 32'; Yaya 82'	Stadium: Stade Augustin Monédan de Sibang; Referee: Chancelle Ngakosso (Congo)
Note: Togo won 4–2 on aggregate.

29 June 2022 Friendly	Botswana	1–1	Togo	Marrakesh, Morocco
18:00 UTC+0	Mahlasela 70'	Report	Woedikou 52'	Stadium: Marrakesh Stadium

3 July 2022 2022 Africa Cup of Nations GS	Tunisia	4–1	Togo	Casablanca, Morocco
21:00 UTC+0	Houij 1'; Ellouzi 12', 60'; Amé 71' (o.g.)	Report	Gnintegma 22' (pen.)	Stadium: Stade Mohammed V Referee: Antsino Twanyanyukwa (Namibia)

6 July 2022 2022 Africa Cup of Nations GS	Togo	1–1	Cameroon	Casablanca, Morocco
21:00 UTC+1	Woedikou 28' (pen.)	Report	Johnson 38'	Stadium: Stade Mohammed V Referee: Zomadre Kore (Ivory Coast)

9 July 2022 2022 Africa Cup of Nations GS	Zambia	4–1	Togo	Rabat, Morocco
21:00 UTC+1	Chanda 15', 60'; Lungu 21'; Mapepa 41'	Report	Woedikou 35'	Stadium: Stade Moulay Hassan; Referee: Shamira Nabadda (Uganda)

=== 2023 ===
22 February 2023 Friendly	Benin	1–3	Togo	Cotonou, Benin
16:00 UTC+1	Ahouassou 15'		Adinda-Apko 6', 44'; Kayaba 56'	Stadium: Stade de l'Amitié

25 February 2023 Friendly	Togo	v	Ghana	Cotonou, Benin
--:-- UTC+1				Stadium: Stade de l'Amitié

22 September 2023 2024 AFWCON qualification First round 1st leg	Djibouti	0–7	Togo	Lomé, Togo
14:30 UTC+0		Report (FTF)	Woedikou 8', 47', 76', 90'; N'djambara 25'; Gnintegma 32'; Kayaba 76'	Stadium: Stade de Kégué

26 September 2023 2024 AFWCON qualification First round 2nd leg	Togo	6–0 (13–0 agg.)	Djibouti	Lomé, Togo
15:30 UTC+0	Woedikou 4', 15', 40'; Koudjoukalo 31', 89'; Adinda-Apko 66'	Report (FTF)		Stadium: Stade de Kégué
Note: Togo won 13–0 on aggregate.

30 November 2023 2024 AFWCON qualification Second round 1st leg	Tanzania	3–0	Togo	Dar es Salaam, Tanzania
16:00 UTC+3	Clement 45', 81'; Yawa 50' (o.g.)	Report (FTF)		Stadium: Azam Complex Stadium

5 December 2023 2024 AFWCON qualification Second round 2nd leg	Togo	2–0 (2–3 agg.)	Tanzania	Lomé, Togo
17:00 UTC+1	Kayaba 67'; Gnintegma 90+12'			Stadium: Stade de Kégué; Referee: Report (FTF)
Note: Tanzania won 3–2 on aggregate.

== See also ==
- Togo national football team results
