= 2024 Women's Africa Cup of Nations qualification =

Tournament details
- Dates: 20–26 September and 29 November – 5 December 2023
- Teams: 42 (from 1 confederation)

Tournament statistics
- Matches played: 56
- Goals scored: 205 (3.66 per match)
- Top scorer: (Mali) Agueicha Diarra (8 goals)

Qualification for the 2024 Women's Africa Cup of Nations began on the week of 20–26 September 2023 and concluded on the week of 29 November – 5 December the same year. Its draw was held at the Mohammed VI Football Academy in Salé, Morocco on 6 July 2023 at 18:00 CET (UTC+1).

A total of 12 teams qualified for the group stages and joined automatically-qualified hosts Morocco.

== Format ==
Qualification ties took place on a home-and-away two-legged basis. If the aggregate score was tied after the second leg, the away goals rule was applied, and if still tied, the penalty shoot-out (no extra time).

== Schedule ==
Round	Leg	Dates
First round	First leg	20 – 22 September 2023
First round	Second leg	24 – 26 September 2023
Second round	First leg	29 November – 1 December 2023
Second round	Second leg	4 and 5 December 2023

== Entrants ==
The applicant teams were seeded according to the FIFA Women's World Ranking of June 2023 and their performance in the previous edition of the tournament.

Tournament hosts
Team	Rank
**Morocco**	72

Teams received a bye to the second round
Team	Rank
**South Africa**	54
**Zambia**	77

Teams entering first round

Pot 1
Team	Rank
**Nigeria**	40
Cameroon	56
**Ghana**	58
Ivory Coast	66
Equatorial Guinea	70
**Tunisia**	76
**Algeria**	80
**Mali**	81
**Senegal**	82

Pot 2
Team	Rank
Egypt	88
Congo	110
**DR Congo**	112
Togo	120
Gambia	123
Ethiopia	124
Cape Verde	134
Gabon	135
Guinea	136

Pot 3
Team	Rank
Burkina Faso	141
Angola	143
Benin	145
Namibia	146
Kenya	148
**Botswana**	150
**Tanzania**	152
Uganda	161
Rwanda	163
Liberia	164
Niger	166
Guinea-Bissau	173
Mozambique	174
Burundi	176
Eswatini	177
South Sudan	187
Mauritius	188
Central African Republic	NR
São Tomé and Príncipe	NR
Libya	NR
Djibouti	NR
Sudan	NR

Notes

- Teams marked in **bold** qualified for the group stages.

Did not enter
Team	Rank
Zimbabwe	125
Sierra Leone	139
Malawi	159
Seychelles	165
Lesotho	169
Comoros	183
Madagascar	184
Chad	NR
Mauritania	NR
Eritrea	NR
Somalia	NR

== First round ==
Team 1	Agg.	Team 2	1st leg	2nd leg
Senegal	3–2	Mozambique	1–1	2–1
Egypt	8–0	South Sudan	4–0	4–0
Central African Republic	1–10	Mali	1–7	0–3
Guinea	11–0	Mauritius	8–0	3–0
Nigeria	w/o	São Tomé and Príncipe	—	—
Cape Verde	6–2	Liberia	3–0	3–2
Uganda	2–3	Algeria	1–2	1–1
Burundi	2–2 (5–3 p)	Ethiopia	1–1	1–1
Equatorial Guinea	w/o	Libya	—	—
DR Congo	4–2	Benin	2–1	2–1
Ivory Coast	2–2 (2–4 p)	Tanzania	2–0	0–2
Djibouti	0–13	Togo	0–7	0–6
Rwanda	0–12	Ghana	0–7	0–5
Gambia	2–5	Namibia	2–3	0–2
Cameroon	1–1 (3–4 p)	Kenya	1–0	0–1
Gabon	1–10	Botswana	1–4	0–6
Tunisia	12–1	Niger	7–0	5–1
Guinea-Bissau	0–3	Congo	0–1	0–2
Angola	w/o	Sudan	—	—
Eswatini	2–6	Burkina Faso	2–3	0–3

=== Matches ===
22 September 2023
17:00 UTC+0

Senegal	1–1	Mozambique
Ndiaye 59'	Report (FSF)	Moçambique 57'

Stade Lat-Dior, Thiès
25 September 2023
19:00 UTC+2

Mozambique	1–2	Senegal
Moçambique 12'	Report (FSF)	Diop 14'; Ndiaye 85'

Stade Lat-Dior, Thiès (Senegal)

Senegal won 3–2 on aggregate.

20 September 2023
18:00 UTC+3

Egypt	4–0	South Sudan
S. Adam 4'; H. Maustafa 27'; O. Samir 38'; S. Essam 57'	Report (EFA)

Petrosport Stadium, Cairo
Referee: Dorsaf Ganouati (Tunisia)
24 September 2023
18:00 UTC+3

South Sudan	0–4	Egypt
	Report (EFA)	S. Adam 17'; H. Maustafa 21'; S. Essam 33', 72'

Al Salam Stadium, Cairo (Egypt)

Egypt won 8–0 on aggregate.

22 September 2023
14:00 UTC+1

Central African Republic	1–7	Mali
Demba 45+3' (pen.)	Report	A. Diarra 3', 15' (pen.), 55'; F. Diarra 6'; O. Koné 18'; A. Traoré 43', 48'

Stade de la Réunification, Douala (Cameroon)
26 September 2023
16:30 UTC+0

Mali	3–0	Central African Republic
A. Diarra 31'; A. Traoré 36'; S. Diarra 58'

Stade du 26 Mars, Bamako

Mali won 10–1 on aggregate.

21 September 2023
16:00 UTC+0

Guinea	8–0	Mauritius
Kourouma 9', 75'; Fancinandouno 40', 66'; M. Camara 54'; Lamah 59'; A. Camara 77'; N. Camara 90'	Report (FGF)

General Lansana Conté Stadium, Conakry
26 September 2023
18:00 UTC+4

Mauritius	0–3	Guinea
	Report (FGF)	A. Camara 5', 38'; M. Camara 32'

Cote d'Or National Sports Complex, Quatre Bornes

Guinea won 11–0 on aggregate.

22 September 2023
16:00 UTC+1

Nigeria	Cancelled	São Tomé and Príncipe

Onikan Stadium, Lagos
25 September 2023

São Tomé and Príncipe	Cancelled	Nigeria

Onikan Stadium, Lagos (Nigeria)

Nigeria won on walkover and advanced to the second round after São Tomé and Príncipe withdrew prior to the first leg without providing a reason for their withdrawal.

22 September 2023
16:00 UTC−1

Cape Verde	3–0	Liberia
Moreira 15', 90+5'; Pereira 53'	Report (FCF)

Estádio Nacional de Cabo Verde, Praia
26 September 2023
15:30 UTC+0

Liberia	2–3	Cape Verde
Agbotsu 13'; Kpan 70' (pen.)	Report (FCF)	Pereira 10'; Santos 23'; Borges 38'

Samuel Kanyon Doe Sports Complex, Monrovia

Cape Verde won 6–2 on aggregate.

20 September 2023
16:00 UTC+3

Uganda	1–2	Algeria
Najjemba 87' (pen.)	Report (FAF); Report (FUFA)	Chebel 47'; Karchouni 51'

FUFA Technical Centre, Njeru
Referee: Tatu Nuru Malogo (Tanzania)
26 September 2023
19:00 UTC+1

Algeria	1–1	Uganda
Bouhani 5'		Najjemba 67' (pen.)

Miloud Hadefi Stadium, Oran
Referee: Chahenda El Maghribi (Egypt)

Algeria won 3–2 on aggregate.

22 September 2023
15:00 UTC+3

Burundi	1–1	Ethiopia
Kanyamuneza 49'	Report (EFF)	Asresahegn 38'

Abebe Bikila Stadium, Addis Ababa (Ethiopia)
26 September 2023
15:30 UTC+3

Ethiopia	1–1	Burundi
Asresahegn 19'	Report (EFF)	Niyonkuru 49'
Penalties
Abera (penalty scored); Yien (penalty missed); Kalsa (penalty scored); Amare (penalty scored)	3–5	(penalty scored) Kanyamuneza; (penalty scored) R. Bukuru; (penalty scored) Nahimana; (penalty scored) Niyonkuru; (penalty scored) Djafari

Abebe Bikila Stadium, Addis Ababa

2–2 on aggregate. Burundi won 5–3 on penalties.

21 September 2023
--:-- UTC+1

Equatorial Guinea	Cancelled	Libya

Estadio de Malabo, Malabo
25 September 2023
--:-- UTC+2

Libya	Cancelled	Equatorial Guinea

Martyrs of February Stadium, Benina

Equatorial Guinea won on walkover and advanced to the second round after Libya withdrew prior to the first leg due to the aftermath of the 2023 Libya floods.

22 September 2023
15:30 UTC+1

DR Congo	2–1	Benin
Pambani 14'; Kabakaba 56'	Report (FECOFA)	Gnammi 30'

Stade des Martyrs, Kinshasa
26 September 2023
17:00 UTC+1

Benin	1–2	DR Congo
Gnammi 5'	Report (FECOFA)	Kanjinga 31'; Kabakaba 34'

Stade de l'Amitié, Cotonou

DR Congo won 4–2 on aggregate.

22 September 2023
15:30 UTC+0

Ivory Coast	2–0	Tanzania
Abrogoua 48'; Guehai 55'	Report (FIF)

Stade de Yamoussoukro, Yamoussoukro
Referee: Ghada Mehat (Algeria)
26 September 2023
16:00 UTC+3

Tanzania	2–0	Ivory Coast
Minja 50'; Clement 52'	Report (FIF)
Penalties
Mabanza (penalty scored); Katunzi (penalty scored); Kasonga (penalty missed); Minja (penalty scored); Clement (penalty scored)	4–2	(penalty scored) Diakité; (penalty missed) Kpaho; (penalty scored) Guehai; (penalty missed) Kakounan

Azam Complex Stadium, Dar es Salaam

2–2 on aggregate. Tanzania won 4–2 on penalties.

22 September 2023
14:30 UTC+0

Djibouti	0–7	Togo
	Report (FTF)	Woedikou 8', 47', 76', 90'; N'djambara 25'; Gnintegma 32'; Kayaba 76'

Stade de Kégué, Lomé (Togo)
26 September 2023
15:30 UTC+0

Togo	6–0	Djibouti
Woedikou 4', 15', 40'; Koudjoukalo 31', 89'; Adinda-Apko 66'	Report (FTF)

Stade de Kégué, Lomé

Togo won 13–0 on aggregate.

20 September 2023
15:00 UTC+2

Rwanda	0–7	Ghana
	Report (GFA)	Boaduwaa 3'; Badu 14', 64'; Adubea 28'; Kusi 51'; Achiaa 76', 81'

Kigali Pelé Stadium, Kigali
26 September 2023
16:00 UTC+0

Ghana	5–0	Rwanda
Kusi 22', 26', 37'; Badu 42'; Nyamekye 90+3'	Report (GFA)

Accra Sports Stadium, Accra
Referee: Jacqueline Nikiema (Burkina Faso)

Ghana won 12–0 on aggregate.

21 September 2023
15:00 UTC+0

Gambia	2–3	Namibia
Kanteh 24', 59' (pen.)	Report (GFF)	Mulunga 14'; Kooper 19'; Coleman 75'

Ben M'Hamed El Abdi Stadium, El Jadida (Morocco)
24 September 2023
17:00 UTC+2

Namibia	2–0	Gambia
Coleman 15', 37'	Report (GFF); Report (NFA)

Moulay Hassan Stadium, Rabat (Morocco)

Namibia won 5–2 on aggregate.

22 September 2023
19:00 UTC+1

Cameroon	1–0	Kenya
Manbolamo 8'	Report (FKF)

Stade de la Réunification, Douala
Referee: Antsino Twanyanyukwa (Namibia)
26 September 2023
15:00 UTC+3

Kenya	1–0	Cameroon
Shilwatso 75'	Report (FKF)
Penalties
Ingosi (penalty missed); Wanyonyi (penalty scored); Andibo (penalty scored); Adam (penalty scored); Aquino (penalty scored)	4–3	(penalty scored) Eto; (penalty missed) Meyong; (penalty scored) Toko Njoya; (penalty missed) Meffometou; (penalty scored) Nchout Njoya

Nyayo National Stadium, Nairobi

1–1 on aggregate. Kenya won 4–3 on penalties.

22 September 2023
16:30 UTC+2

Gabon	1–4	Botswana
Assengone 90+3' (pen.)	Report (BFA)	Radiakanyo 56'; Ontlametse 76', 89'; Tholakele 90'

Stade de Franceville, Franceville
Referee: Greta Musimu (DR Congo)
26 September 2023
15:00 UTC+2

Botswana	6–0	Gabon
Radiakanyo 8'; Ontlametse 10', 30'; Baeletsi 40'; Dithebe 45+4'; Gaofetoge 57'	Report (BFA)

Lobatse Stadium, Lobatse

Botswana won 10–1 on aggregate.

22 September 2023
16:00 UTC+1

Tunisia	7–0	Niger
Houij 14', 58'; Klai 43'; Ellouzi 67', 80', 90+2'; Hamdi 73'	Report (FTF)

Stade municipal de Soliman, Soliman
26 September 2023
15:30 UTC+1

Niger	1–5	Tunisia
Hamed 90' (pen.)	Report (FTF)	Ellouzi 9', 49'; Mamay 15'; Houij 45+1' (pen.); Zemzem 77'

Stade municipal de Soliman, Soliman (Tunisia)

Tunisia won 12–1 on aggregate.

21 September 2023
15:30 UTC+0

Guinea-Bissau	0–1	Congo
	Report (FECOFOOT)	Mabahou 89'

Estádio 24 de Setembro, Bissau
26 September 2023
15:30 UTC+1

Congo	2–0	Guinea-Bissau
Senga 58'; Dembélé 78'

Stade Alphonse Massemba-Débat, Brazzaville

Congo won 3–0 on aggregate.

19 September 2023
--:-- UTC+1

Angola	Cancelled	Sudan

Estádio dos Coqueiros, Luanda
25 September 2023
--:-- UTC+2

Sudan	Cancelled	Angola

Kigali Pelé Stadium, Kigali (Rwanda)

Angola won on walkover and advanced to the second round after Sudan withdrew prior to the first leg citing lack of preparation due to no local championship being contested since the War in Sudan started.

20 September 2023
15:00 UTC+2

Eswatini	2–3	Burkina Faso
Simelane 47'; Ngcamphalala 90+1'	Report (FBF); Report (EFA)	Belem 16'; R. Sawadogo 20'; Compaore 32'

Somhlolo National Stadium, Lobamba
26 September 2023
16:00 UTC+0

Burkina Faso	3–0	Eswatini
Kabré 8', 19'; Zongo 61'

Stade de la Paix, Bouaké (Ivory Coast)

Burkina Faso won 6–2 on aggregate.

== Second round ==
Team 1	Agg.	Team 2	1st leg	2nd leg
Senegal	4–0	Egypt	4–0	0–0
Mali	10–2	Guinea	7–2	3–0
Nigeria	7–1	Cape Verde	5–0	2–1
Algeria	6–1	Burundi	5–1	1–0
Equatorial Guinea	2–3	DR Congo	1–1	1–2
Tanzania	3–2	Togo	3–0	0–2
Ghana	3–2	Namibia	3–1	0–1
Kenya	1–2	Botswana	1–1	0–1
Tunisia	6–3	Congo	5–2	1–1
Angola	0–12	Zambia	0–6	0–6
Burkina Faso	1–3	South Africa	1–1	0–2

=== Matches ===
30 November 2023
17:00 UTC+0

Senegal	4–0	Egypt
Babou 26'; Ndiaye 30'; H. Diallo 68'; Sow 88'	Report (FSF)

Stade Lat-Dior, Thiès
5 December 2023
18:00 UTC+2

Egypt	0–0	Senegal

Al Salam Stadium, Cairo

Senegal won 4–0 on aggregate.

30 November 2023
16:30 UTC+0

Mali	7–2	Guinea
A. Diarra 5', 45+2', 69'; Dembelé 11'; Sogoré 34'; Baradji 83'; A. Traoré 90+2' (pen.)	Report (FEMAFOOT); Report (FEGUIFOOT)	Lamah 39'; Kourouma 90'

Stade du 26 Mars, Bamako
5 December 2023
17:00 UTC+0

Guinea	0–3	Mali
		F. Diarra 41'; Koné 57'; A. Diarra 90+4'

Stade Lat-Dior, Thiès (Senegal)

Mali won 10–2 on aggregate.

30 November 2023
16:00 UTC+1

Nigeria	5–0	Cape Verde
Kanu 7', 45+1'; Monday 25'; Okoronkwo 66', 77'	Report (NFF)

Onikan Stadium, Lagos
5 December 2023
16:00 UTC−1

Cape Verde	1–2	Nigeria
Fortes 8'		Okoronkwo 62'; Ajibade 90+3'

Estádio Nacional de Cabo Verde, Praia

Nigeria won 7–1 on aggregate.

30 November 2023
17:00 UTC+1

Algeria	5–1	Burundi
Boutaleb 32', 43', 67'; Boussaha 65'; Chebel 80'	Report (FAF)	Niyomwungere 29'

Stade du 5 Juillet, Algiers
Referee: Aline Guimbang Etong (Cameroon)
4 December 2023
17:00 UTC+3

Burundi	0–1	Algeria
	Report (FAF)	Boutaleb 17'

Stade du 5 Juillet, Algiers (Algeria)
Referee: Dominique Hanjavola (Madagascar)

Algeria won 6–1 on aggregate.

1 December 2023
16:00 UTC+1

Equatorial Guinea	1–1	DR Congo
Obono 20'		Kabakaba 72'

Estadio de Malabo, Malabo
5 December 2023
13:30 UTC+1

DR Congo	2–1	Equatorial Guinea
Kanjinga 55'; Kipoyi 75'		Obono 45'

Stade des Martyrs, Kinshasa

DR Congo won 3–2 on aggregate. A CAF decision on Equatorial Guinea challenge, regarding DR Congo players Fideline Ngoy and Falonne Pambani's dates of birth, is pending.

30 November 2023
16:00 UTC+3

Tanzania	3–0	Togo
Clement 45', 81'; Yawa 50' (o.g.)	Report (FTF)

Azam Complex Stadium, Dar es Salaam
5 December 2023
17:00 UTC+1

Togo	2–0	Tanzania
Kayaba 67'; Gnintegma 90+12'

Stade de Kégué, Lomé

Tanzania won 3–2 on aggregate.

1 December 2023
15:30 UTC+0

Ghana	3–1	Namibia
Boaduwaa 26', 58'; Boakye 37'		Boakye 69' (o.g.)

Accra Sports Stadium, Accra
Referee: Ghada Mehat (Algeria)
5 December 2023
14:00 UTC+1

Namibia	1–0	Ghana
Nanamus 15'

Lucas Moripe Stadium, Pretoria (South Africa)

Ghana won 3–2 on aggregate.

29 November 2023
15:00 UTC+3

Kenya	1–1	Botswana
Nekesa 45+4' (pen.)	Report (CAF)	Dithebe 37'

Nyayo National Stadium, Nairobi
5 December 2023
18:00 UTC+1

Botswana	1–0	Kenya
Dithebe 62'

Botswana National Stadium, Gaborone

Botswana won 2–1 on aggregate.

30 November 2023
14:30 UTC+1

Tunisia	5–2	Congo
Zemzem 13', 37', 57'; Houij 44'; Ellouzi 50'	Report (FTF)	56'; 87'

Stade municipal de Soliman, Soliman
5 December 2023
15:30 UTC+1

Congo	1–1	Tunisia
Bouanga 18'		Ellouzi 46'

Stade Alphonse Massemba-Débat, Brazzaville

Tunisia won 6–3 on aggregate.

29 November 2023
16:00 UTC+1

Angola	0–6	Zambia
	Report (CAF)	Mweemba 40'; B. Banda 44' (pen.), 45+2', 64'; Lungu 52'; Kundananji 87'

Estádio 22 de Junho, Luanda
5 December 2023
18:00 UTC+2

Zambia	6–0	Angola
Kundananji 5', 86'; B. Banda 14'; S. Banda 46'; Chitundu 71'; E. Banda 76'

Levy Mwanawasa Stadium, Ndola, Zambia

Zambia won 12–0 on aggregate.

30 November 2023
17:00 UTC+1

Burkina Faso	1–1	South Africa
Konaté 68'	Report (SAFA)	Magaia 56'

Charles Konan Banny Stadium, Yamoussoukro (Ivory Coast)
Referee: Aissata Lam (MRT)
4 December 2023
15:00 UTC+1

South Africa	2–0	Burkina Faso
Motlhalo 56' (pen.); Michael 86'

Lucas Moripe Stadium, Pretoria

South Africa won 3–1 on aggregate.

== Qualified teams ==
The following teams qualified for the final tournament.

Team	Qualified as	Qualified on	Previous appearances in Women's Africa Cup of Nations^{1}
Morocco	Hosts	10 August 2022	3 (1998, 2000, 2022)
South Africa	Second round winners	4 December 2023	13 (1995, 1998, 2000, 2002, 2004, 2006, 2008, 2010, 2012, 2014, 2016, 2018, **2022**)
Algeria	Second round winners	4 December 2023	5 (2004, 2006, 2010, 2014, 2018)
Ghana	Second round winners	5 December 2023	12 (1991, 1995, 1998, 2000, 2002, 2004, 2006, 2008, 2010, 2014, 2016, 2018)
Botswana	Second round winners	5 December 2023	1 (2022)
DR Congo	Second round winners	5 December 2023	3 (1998, 2006, 2012)
Tunisia	Second round winners	5 December 2023	2 (2008, 2022)
Senegal	Second round winners	5 December 2023	2 (2012, 2022)
Zambia	Second round winners	5 December 2023	4 (1995, 2014, 2018, 2022)
Tanzania	Second round winners	5 December 2023	1 (2010)
Mali	Second round winners	5 December 2023	7 (2002, 2004, 2006, 2008, 2010, 2016, 2018)
Nigeria	Second round winners	5 December 2023	14 (**1991**, **1995**, **1998**, **2000**, **2002**, **2004**, **2006**, 2008, **2010**, 2012, **2014**, **2016**, **2018**, 2022)

^{1} Bold indicates champions for that year. Italic indicates hosts for that year.

== Goalscorers ==
There were 205 goals scored in 56 matches, for an average of 3.66 goals per match.

8 goals

- (Mali) Agueicha Diarra

7 goals

- (Togo) Mafille Woedikou
- (Tunisia) Sabrine Ellouzi

4 goals

- (Algeria) Inès Boutaleb
- (Botswana) Gaonyadiwe Ontlametse
- (Ghana) Alice Kusi
- (Mali) Aissata Traoré
- (Tunisia) Mariem Houij
- (Tunisia) Salma Zemzem
- (Zambia) Barbra Banda

3 goals

- (Botswana) Keitumetse Dithebe
- (Democratic Republic of the Congo) Naomie Kabakaba
- (Egypt) Sarah Essam
- (Ghana) Evelyn Badu
- (Ghana) Doris Boaduwaa
- (Guinea) Aminata Camara
- (Guinea) Nency Kourouma
- (Namibia) Zenatha Coleman
- (Nigeria) Esther Okoronkwo
- (Senegal) Nguenar Ndiaye
- (Tanzania) Opah Clement
- (Zambia) Racheal Kundananji

2 goals

- (Algeria) Imane Chebel
- (Benin) Yolande Gnammi
- (Botswana) Lesego Radiakanyo
- (Burkina Faso) Adèle Kabré
- (Cape Verde) Ivânia Moreira
- (Cape Verde) Evy Pereira
- (Democratic Republic of the Congo) Merveille Kanjinga
- (Egypt) Samia Adam
- (Egypt) Hala Maustafa
- (Equatorial Guinea) Elena Obono
- (Ethiopia) Rediet Asresahegn
- (The Gambia) Fatou Kanteh
- (Ghana) Anasthesia Achiaa
- (Guinea) Maman Sata Fancinandouno
- (Guinea) Suzanne Daniel Lamah
- (Mali) Fatoumata Diarra
- (Mali) Oumou Kone
- (Mozambique) Lúcia Leila
- (Nigeria) Uchenna Kanu
- (Togo) Odette Gnintegma
- (Togo) Tatiana Kayaba
- (Togo) Sama Koudjoukalo
- (Uganda) Fauzia Najjemba

1 goal

- (Algeria) Naïma Bouhani
- (Algeria) Lina Boussaha
- (Algeria) Ghoutia Karchouni
- (Botswana) Nancy Baeletsi
- (Botswana) Lone Gaofetoge
- (Botswana) Refilwe Tholakele
- (Burkina Faso) Alimata Belem
- (Burkina Faso) Mouniratou Compaore
- (Burkina Faso) Yasso Konaté
- (Burkina Faso) Rasmata Sawadogo
- (Burkina Faso) Djamilatou Zongo
- (Burundi) Erica Kanyamuneza
- (Burundi) Peace Niyomwungere
- (Burundi) Sandrine Niyonkuru
- (Cameroon) Eliane Manbolamo
- (Cape Verde) Kleydiana Borges
- (Cape Verde) Melany Fortes
- (Cape Verde) Alcione Santos
- (Central African Republic) Christelle Demba
- (Republic of the Congo) Queen Bouanga
- (Republic of the Congo) Aminata Dembélé
- (Republic of the Congo) Flore Mabahou
- (Republic of the Congo) Doris Senga
- (Republic of the Congo) ?
- (Republic of the Congo) ?
- (Democratic Republic of the Congo) Ruth Kipoyi
- (Democratic Republic of the Congo) Falonne Pambani
- (Egypt) Omneya Samir
- (Eswatini) Tenanile Ngcamphalala
- (Eswatini) Samkelisiwe Simelane
- (Gabon) Laschwana Assengone
- (Ghana) Princella Adubea
- (Ghana) Portia Boakye
- (Ghana) Stella Nyamekye
- (Guinea) Mabinty Camara
- (Guinea) Mamet Camara
- (Guinea) Nana Camara
- (Ivory Coast) Akebie Abrogoua
- (Ivory Coast) Ida Guehai
- (Kenya) Marjolen Nekesa
- (Kenya) Cynthia Shilwatso
- (Liberia) Pauline Agbotsu
- (Liberia) Hawa Kpan
- (Mali) Djenaba Baradji
- (Mali) Fatou Dembelé
- (Mali) Salimata Diarra
- (Mali) Coulouba Sogoré
- (Namibia) Ivone Kooper
- (Namibia) Lovisa Mulunga
- (Namibia) Lydiana Nanamus
- (Nigeria) Rasheedat Ajibade
- (Niger) Aichatou Hamed
- (Nigeria) Gift Monday
- (Senegal) Marième Babou
- (Senegal) Hapsatou Malado Diallo
- (Senegal) Mama Diop
- (Senegal) Mbayang Sow
- (South Africa) Hildah Magaia
- (South Africa) Nicole Michael
- (South Africa) Linda Motlhalo
- (Tanzania) Donisia Minja
- (Togo) Moussouriéto Adinda-Apko
- (Togo) Amiratou N'djambara
- (Tunisia) Hanna Hamdi
- (Tunisia) Yasmine Klai
- (Tunisia) Sabrine Mamay
- (Zambia) Esther Banda
- (Zambia) Susan Banda
- (Zambia) Avell Chitundu
- (Zambia) Ireen Lungu
- (Zambia) Lushomo Mweemba

1 own goal

- (Ghana) Portia Boakye (against Namibia)
- (Togo) Kouno Yawa (against Tanzania)
