= 2022 Women's Africa Cup of Nations qualification =

Qualification for the 2022 WAFCON

Tournament details
- Dates: 18 – 26 October 2021 and 14 – 23 February 2022
- Teams: 44 (from 1 confederation)

Tournament statistics
- Matches played: 58
- Goals scored: 218 (3.76 per match)
- Top scorers: (Kenya) Neddy Atieno; (Tunisia) Mariem Houij; (6 goals each)

Qualification for the 2022 Women's Africa Cup of Nations began with the first round during the week of 18–26 October 2021 and concluded with the second during the week of 14–23 February 2022. For the first time in the tournament's history, 12 teams, including hosts (Morocco), qualified to play in the group stages.

== Format ==
Qualification ties were to be played on a home-and-away two-legged basis. If the aggregate score was tied after the second leg, the away goals rule would be applied, even to the extent of a penalty shoot-out with no extra time played if scores are still tied to determine the winners.

== Draw ==
A record total of 44 out of 54 CAF member national teams entered qualification, whose draw was held on 10 May 2021 at the CAF headquarters in Cairo, Egypt.

- In the first round, the 44 teams were drawn into 22 ties, with teams divided into six pots based on their geographical zones and those in the same pot drawn to play against each other.
- In the second round, the preliminary round winners were allocated into 11 ties based on the first round tie numbers.

First round entrants (44 teams)
Pot A (8 from CECAFA)	Pot B (10 from COSAFA)	Pot C (4 from UNAF)	Pot D (8 from UNIFFAC)	Pot E (8 from WAFU A)	Pot F (6 from WAFU B)
Ethiopia; Uganda; South Sudan; Eritrea; Kenya; Djibouti; Burundi; Rwanda	Malawi; Zambia; Tanzania; Namibia; Eswatini; Zimbabwe; Angola; Botswana; Mozambique; South Africa	Algeria; Tunisia; Egypt; Sudan	Equatorial Guinea; DR Congo; São Tomé and Príncipe; Togo; Congo; Gabon; Cameroon; Central African Republic	Sierra Leone; Gambia; Liberia; Senegal; Mauritania; Mali; Guinea; Guinea-Bissau	Burkina Faso; Nigeria; Ghana; Ivory Coast; Benin; Niger

=== Did not enter ===
- Cape Verde
- Chad
- Comoros
- Lesotho
- Libya
- Madagascar
- Mauritius
- Seychelles
- Somalia

== Schedule ==
The first round of matches was originally scheduled for June 2021, but were postponed to October that year due to the after-effects of the COVID-19 pandemic in Africa.

Round	Leg	Date
First round	First leg	18 – 26 October 2021
First round	Second leg	18 – 26 October 2021
Second round	First leg	16–18 February 2022
Second round	Second leg	21–23 February 2022

== First round ==
=== Summary ===
Team 1	Agg.	Team 2	1st leg	2nd leg
Uganda	2–2 (2–1 p)	Ethiopia	2–0	0–2
Kenya	15–1	South Sudan	8–0	7–1
Eritrea	0–6	Burundi	0–5	0–1
Djibouti	w/o (Note: Djibouti won on walkover and advanced to the second round after Rwanda withdrew before the first leg citing lack of preparation due to no local league being contested since 2018.)	Rwanda	—	—
Malawi	3–4	Zambia	1–1	2–3
Tanzania	3–5	Namibia	1–2	2–3
Zimbabwe	6–1	Eswatini	3–1	3–0
Angola	1–7	Botswana	1–5	0–2
Mozambique	0–13	South Africa	0–7	0–6
Algeria	w/o (Note: The second leg match between Sudan and Algeria initially scheduled for 26 October was postponed and later cancelled due to security concerns following the October 2021 Sudanese coup d'état.)	Sudan	14–0	—
Egypt	2–7	Tunisia	2–6	0–1
Equatorial Guinea	w/o (Note: Equatorial Guinea won on walkover and advanced to the second round after DR Congo failed to appear for the first leg.)	DR Congo	—	—
São Tomé and Príncipe	w/o (Note: Togo won on walkover and advanced to the second round after São Tomé and Príncipe withdrew from the second leg in Togo.)	Togo	0–5	—
Congo	2–2 (a)	Gabon	2–1	0–1
Central African Republic	0–3	Cameroon	0–1	0–2
Sierra Leone	1–3	Gambia	0–2	1–1
Liberia	1–8	Senegal	1–2	0–6
Mali	4–2	Guinea	2–2	2–0
Guinea-Bissau	2–0	Mauritania	1–0	1–0
Burkina Faso	5–2	Benin	2–1	3–1
Nigeria	2–1	Ghana	2–0	0–1
Niger	0–20	Ivory Coast	0–9	0–11

=== Matches ===
20 October 2021
16:00 UTC+3

Uganda	2–0	Ethiopia
Nabbosa 3'; Najjemba 75'

St. Mary's Stadium-Kitende, Kampala
Referee: Josephine Wanjiku (Kenya)
26 October 2021
16:00 UTC+3

Ethiopia	2–0	Uganda
Wakuma 22'; Abera 32'
Penalties
Abera (penalty missed); Kalsa (penalty missed); Adisu (penalty scored); Dengiso (penalty missed); Gebrekirstos (penalty missed)	1–2	(penalty scored) Nassuna; (penalty missed) Nabirye; (penalty scored) Najjemba; (penalty missed) Komuntale

Bahir Dar International Stadium, Bahir Dar
Referee: Aline Umutoni (Rwanda)

2–2 on aggregate. Uganda won 2–1 on penalties.

20 October 2021
18:00 UTC+3

Kenya	8–0	South Sudan
Atieno 2', 3', 34', 57', 62'; Shikangwa 40', 72'; Adam 65'

Nyayo National Stadium, Nairobi
Referee: Salima Mukansanga (Rwanda)
23 October 2021
16:00 UTC+3

South Sudan	1–7	Kenya
Lasu 81'		Adam 37' (pen.), 45'; Bundi 48'; Shikangwa 67', 73'; Akoth 88'; Atieno 90+3'

Nyayo National Stadium, Nairobi (Kenya)
Referee: Florentina Zablon (Tanzania)

Kenya won 15–1 on aggregate.

20 October 2021
16:00 UTC+3

Eritrea	0–5	Burundi
		Uwimana 13'; Niyonkuru 20'; Djafari 24', 49' (pen.); Bukuru 81'

Denden Stadium, Asmara
Referee: Khamdallah El Shayeb (Sudan)
26 October 2021
15:00 UTC+2

Burundi	1–0	Eritrea
Bukuru 21'

Stade Urukundo, Ngozi
Referee: Asnakech Gebre (Ethiopia)

Burundi won 6–0 on aggregate.

20 October 2021
19:00 UTC+3

Djibouti	Cancelled	Rwanda

El Hadj Hassan Gouled Aptidon Stadium, Djibouti
26 October 2021
16:00 UTC+2

Rwanda	Cancelled	Djibouti

Nyamirambo Regional Stadium, Kigali

Djibouti won on walkover after Rwanda withdrew before the first leg citing lack of preparation due to no local league being contested since 2018.

20 October 2021
16:00 UTC+2

Malawi	1–1	Zambia
Thom 66'		Chanda 21'

Bingu National Stadium, Lilongwe
Referee: Itumeleng Methikga (Botswana)
26 October 2021
15:00 UTC+2

Zambia	3–2	Malawi
Kundananji 25', 41'; Mweemba 74'		Simwaka 9'; Mvula 70'

Nkoloma Stadium, Lusaka

Zambia won 4–3 on aggregate.

20 October 2021
16:00 UTC+3

Tanzania	1–2	Namibia
Athumani 41'		Coleman 22', 61'

National Stadium, Dar es Salaam
Referee: Lidya Tafesse (Ethiopia)
23 October 2021
15:30 UTC+2

Namibia	3–2	Tanzania
Coleman 16', 21', 43'		Shurua 8'; Clement 58'

Dobsonville Stadium, Johannesburg (South Africa)
Referee: Nteboheleng Setoko (Lesotho)

Namibia won 5–3 on aggregate.

20 October 2021
15:00 UTC+2

Zimbabwe	3–1	Eswatini
Nyaumwe 5'; Mupeti 17'; Msipa 45'		Mokgale 42'

National Sports Stadium, Harare
Referee: Akhona Makalima (South Africa)
26 October 2021
16:00 UTC+2

Eswatini	0–3	Zimbabwe
		Nyaumwe 12'; Mafuruse 57'; Dambamuromo 58'

Mavuso Sports Centre, Manzini
Referee: Vistoria Shangula (Namibia)

Zimbabwe won 6–1 on aggregate.

20 October 2021
17:00 UTC+1

Angola	1–5	Botswana
Ngonguinha 8'		Tholakele 5', 49'; Thanda 42'; Radiakanyo 48', 74'

Estádio dos Coqueiros, Luanda
26 October 2021
16:00 UTC+2

Botswana	0–0	Angola
Thanda 14'; Ramafifi 16'

Francistown Stadium, Francistown

Botswana won 7–1 on aggregate.

20 October 2021
15:00 UTC+2

Mozambique	0–7	South Africa
		Jane 22'; Motlhalo 41', 87'; Salgado 45+2', 65'; Van Wyk 64'; Cesane 75'

Estádio do Zimpeto, Maputo
Referee: Tânia Duarte (Angola)
26 October 2021
16:00 UTC+2

South Africa	6–0	Mozambique
Mbane 10'; Motlhalo 32', 65'; Magaia 40', 50'; Holweni 85'

Orlando Stadium, Johannesburg
Referee: Mercy Kayira (Malawi)

South Africa won 13–0 on aggregate.

20 October 2021
18:00 UTC+1

Algeria	14–0	Sudan
Oum Srir 2' (o.g.); Bouhani 6', 15', 37', 46'; Koui 11', 67'; Bouzid 17', 18'; Ould Braham 29', 30'; Belkacemi 48'; Bara 71'; Merrouche 82'

Omar Hamadi Stadium, Algiers
Referee: Asma Chouchane (Tunisia)
26 October 2021

Sudan	Cancelled	Algeria

Al Hilal Stadium, Omdurman
Referee: Suzana Semere (Eritrea)

Algeria won on walkover after the second leg match originally scheduled for 26 October 2021 was postponed and later cancelled due to the October–November 2021 Sudanese coup d'état.

20 October 2021
16:00 UTC+2

Egypt	2–6	Tunisia
Sherif 7'; Nadda 66'		Maknoun 6'; Kaabachi 34', 47', 79'; Houij 74' (pen.); Ellouzi 82'

Petro Sport Stadium, Cairo
Referee: Bouchra Karboubi (Morocco)
26 October 2021
15:00 UTC+1

Tunisia	1–0	Egypt
Houij 90+1'

Stade El Menzah, Tunis
Referee: Mame Coumba Faye (Senegal)

Tunisia won 7–2 on aggregate.

20 October 2021
18:00 UTC+1

Equatorial Guinea	Cancelled	DR Congo

Estadio de Malabo, Malabo
Referee: Chancelle Ngakosso (Congo)
24 October 2021
15:30 UTC+1

DR Congo	Cancelled	Equatorial Guinea

Stade des Martyrs, Kinshasa
Referee: Annael Omanda (Gabon)

Equatorial Guinea won on walkover and advanced to the second round after DR Congo failed to appear for the first leg.

22 October 2021
13:00 UTC+0

São Tomé and Príncipe	0–5	Togo
		Gnintegma 2', 63', 67'; Woedikou 17'; Konou 70' (pen.)

Estádio Nacional 12 de Julho, São Tomé
Attendance: 45
Referee: Marie Ngo Biem (Cameroon)
26 October 2021
16:00 UTC+0

Togo	Cancelled	São Tomé and Príncipe

Stade de Kégué, Lomé

Togo won on walkover after São Tomé and Príncipe withdrew from the second leg in Togo.

20 October 2021
15:30 UTC+1

Congo	2–1	Gabon
Yamounou 15'; Loufoua 44'		Edzoumou 84'

Stade Alphonse Massemba-Débat, Brazzaville
Attendance: 115
Referee: Carine Ayom Ampur (DR Congo)
26 October 2021
15:30 UTC+1

Gabon	1–0	Congo
Bikita 79'

Stade Augustin Monédan de Sibang, Libreville
Attendance: 300
Referee: Maria Diangha (Cameroon)

2–2 on aggregate. Gabon won on away goals.

20 October 2021
14:00 UTC+1

Central African Republic	0–1	Cameroon
		Nchout 90+1'

Japoma Stadium, Douala (Cameroon)
24 October 2021
15:30 UTC+1

Cameroon	2–0	Central African Republic
Yango 69'; Bodolo 90+3'

Ahmadou Ahidjo Stadium, Yaoundé

Cameroon won 3–0 on aggregate.

18 October 2021
16:00 UTC+0

Sierra Leone	0–2	Gambia
		Buwaru 53'; Joof 77'

Antoinette Tubman Stadium, Monrovia (Liberia)
Referee: Aïssatou Kanté (Guinea)
25 October 2021
16:30 UTC+0

Gambia	0–1	Sierra Leone
Kanteh 23'		Macauley 54'

Independence Stadium, Bakau

Gambia won 3–1 on aggregate.

20 October 2021
15:00 UTC+0

Liberia	1–2	Senegal
Kikeh 90+5'		Diop 24'; Diakhaté 85'

Samuel Kanyon Doe Sports Complex, Paynesville
Attendance: 50
Referee: Ana Maria Lopes (Cape Verde)
26 October 2021
17:00 UTC+0

Senegal	0–0	Liberia
Diakhaté 4'; Ndiaye 30', 44', 45+2'; Diop 63', 67'

Stade Lat-Dior, Thiès
Attendance: 175
Referee: Isatou Touray (Gambia)

Senegal won 8–1 on aggregate.

20 October 2021
16:30 UTC+0

Mali	2–2	Guinea
B. Diarra 11'; Traoré 22'		Sogoré 5' (o.g.); Camara 66'

Stade Modibo Keita, Bamako
Referee: Shahenda El Maghrabi (Egypt)
25 October 2021
16:00 UTC+0

Guinea	0–2	Mali
		Traoré 56'; A. Diarra 77'

General Lansana Conté Stadium, Conakry
Referee: Aïssata Boudy Lam (Mauritania)

Mali won 4–2 on aggregate.

20 October 2021
15:30 UTC+0

Guinea-Bissau	0–0	Mauritania
Mané 73'

Estádio 24 de Setembro, Bissau
Referee: Sylvina Garnett (Liberia)
26 October 2021
16:00 UTC+0

Mauritania	0–1	Guinea-Bissau
		Man 49'

Stade Olympique, Nouakchott
Referee: Félicité Kourouma (Guinea)

Guinea-Bissau won 2–0 on aggregate.

20 October 2021
16:00 UTC+0

Burkina Faso	2–1	Benin
Millogo 48'; Nikiéma 79'		Fachinan 39'

Stade National de la Côte d'Ivoire, Abidjan (Ivory Coast)
Referee: Yemisi Eunice (Nigeria)
24 October 2021
17:00 UTC+1

Benin	1–3	Burkina Faso
Atanhloueto 90'		Tamboura 39'; Sawadogo 50'; Millogo 90+2'

Stade de l'Amitié, Cotonou
Referee: Zouwaira Souley Sani (Niger)

Burkina Faso won 5–2 on aggregate.

20 October 2021
16:00 UTC+1

Nigeria	2–0	Ghana
Kanu 22', 26'

Onikan Stadium, Lagos
Referee: Vincentia Amedome (Togo)
24 October 2021
16:00 UTC+0

Ghana	1–0	Nigeria
Adubea 47'

Accra Sports Stadium, Accra
Referee: Zomadre Kore (Ivory Coast)

Nigeria won 2–1 on aggregate.

20 October 2021
16:30 UTC+1

Niger	0–9	Ivory Coast
		Diakité 8'; Elloh 10'; Guehai 24', 29', 30'; N'Guessan 46', 48'; Nrehy 55'; Kouassi 82'

Stade Général Seyni Kountché, Niamey
Referee: Aurore Ligan (Benin)
25 October 2021
15:30 UTC+0

Ivory Coast	11–0	Niger
Nrehy 1'; Coulibaly 19', 67'; Kakounan 30'; Guehai 35'; Kouassi 44', 79', 85'; Aby 53'; Elloh 62'; Konan 80'

Stade Robert Champroux, Abidjan
Referee: Juliet Appiah (Ghana)

Ivory Coast won 20–0 on aggregate.

== Second round ==
=== Summary ===
The matches were played between 16 and 23 February 2022. Winners will qualify for the group stages of the 2022 Women's Africa Cup of Nations.

Team 1	Agg.	Team 2	1st leg	2nd leg
Uganda	w/o (Note: Uganda won on walkover and advanced to the group stages after Kenya withdrew before the first leg.)	Kenya	—	—
Burundi	11–1	Djibouti	6–1	5–0
Zambia	1–1 (a)	Namibia	0–0	1–1
Zimbabwe	3–3 (a)	Botswana	1–3	2–0
South Africa	3–1	Algeria	2–0	1–1
Tunisia	7–3	Equatorial Guinea	5–0	2–3
Togo	4–2	Gabon	2–1	2–1
Cameroon	10–1	Gambia	8–0	2–1
Senegal	1–1 (3–2 p)	Mali	1–0	0–1
Guinea-Bissau	0–7	Burkina Faso	0–6	0–1
Nigeria	3–0	Ivory Coast	2–0	1–0

=== Matches ===
16 February 2022

Uganda	Cancelled	Kenya

23 February 2022

Kenya	Cancelled	Uganda

Uganda advanced on walkover after Kenya withdrew before the first leg.

16 February 2022
15:00 UTC+2

Burundi	6–1	Djibouti
Bizimana 19', 43', 62'; Djafari 24'; Uwimana 45+3'; Niyonkuru 57'		Abdo 33'

Stade Urukundo, Ngozi
Referee: Shamirah Nabadda (Uganda)
21 February 2022
15:00 UTC+2

Djibouti	0–5	Burundi
		Bizimana 9', 54'; Uwimana 38', 86', 90+5'

Stade Urukundo, Ngozi (Burundi)
Referee: Josephine Wanjiku (Kenya)

Burundi won 11–1 on aggregate.

16 February 2022
15:00 UTC+2

Zambia	0–0	Namibia

Nkoloma Stadium, Lusaka
Referee: Letticia Viana (Eswatini)
22 February 2022
15:00 UTC+2

Namibia	1–1	Zambia
Naris 6'		Mapepa 70'

Dobsonville Stadium, Johannesburg (South Africa)
Referee: Akhona Makalima (South Africa)

1–1 on aggregate. Zambia won on away goals.

18 February 2022
15:00 UTC+2

Zimbabwe	1–3	Botswana
Mupeti 86'		Tholakele 47'; Radiakanyo 77', 90+5'

National Sports Stadium, Harare
Referee: Vistoria Shangula (Namibia)
23 February 2022
18:00 UTC+2

Botswana	0–2	Zimbabwe
		Msipa 66'; Mupeti 70'

Francistown Stadium, Francistown
Referee: Gloria Sambumba (Zambia)

3–3 on aggregate. Botswana won on away goals.

18 February 2022
15:00 UTC+2

South Africa	2–0	Algeria
Magaia 40'; Kgatlana 89'

Orlando Stadium, Johannesburg
Referee: Mercy Kayira (Malawi)
23 February 2022
18:00 UTC+1

Algeria	1–1	South Africa
Koui 45+2'		Motlhalo 63' (pen.)

Stade Omar Hamadi, Algiers
Referee: Dorsaf Ganouati (Tunisia)

South Africa won 3–1 on aggregate.

18 February 2022
15:00 UTC+1

Tunisia	5–0	Equatorial Guinea
Houij 2', 32', 45+3'; Ellouzi 55', 65'

Stade Municipal de Soliman, Soliman
Referee: Shahenda El-Maghrabi (Egypt)
23 February 2022
16:00 UTC+1

Equatorial Guinea	3–2	Tunisia
Elena 36', 90'; Anaís 82'		Houij 8'; Aouni 20'

Estadio de Malabo, Malabo
Referee: Marie Ngo Biem (Cameroon)

Tunisia won 7–3 on aggregate.

17 February 2022
15:00 UTC+0

Togo	2–1	Gabon
Gake 29'; Gnintegma 90+6'		Obiang 59'

Stade de Kégué, Lomé
Referee: Aurore Ligan (Benin)
23 February 2022
15:30 UTC+1

Gabon	1–2	Togo
Obiang 63'		Sama 32'; Yaya 82'

Stade Augustin Monédan de Sibang, Libreville
Attendance: 400
Referee: Chancelle Ngakosso (Congo)

Togo won 4–2 on aggregate.

18 February 2022
15:30 UTC+1

Cameroon	8–0	Gambia
Kameni 2', 30'; Nchout 15'; Bella 27'; Meffometou 56'; Ewodo Ekogo 69'; Ngo Mbeleck 74', 86'

Ahmadou Ahidjo Stadium, Yaoundé
Referee: Akhona Makalima (South Africa)
23 February 2022
16:00 UTC+0

Gambia	1–2	Cameroon
Jatta 56'		Onguéné 7'; Ossol 40'

Independence Stadium, Bakau
Referee: Mame Coumba Faye (Senegal)

Cameroon won 10–1 on aggregate.

16 February 2022
16:30 UTC+0

Senegal	1–0	Mali
Ndiaye 72'

Stade Lat-Dior, Thiès
Referee: Aïssata Boudy Lam (Mauritania)
22 February 2022
18:00 UTC+0

Mali	1–0	Senegal
A. Diarra 14'
Penalties
F. Diarra (penalty missed); S. Diarra (penalty missed); Sogoré (penalty scored); Baradji (penalty scored); Niakaté (penalty missed)	2–3	(penalty scored) Diop; (penalty missed) Ndiaye; (penalty scored) Diakhaté; (penalty scored) Baldé

Stade Modibo Kéïta, Bamako
Referee: Juliet Appiah (Ghana)

1–1 on aggregate. Senegal won 3–2 on penalties.

16 February 2022
15:30 UTC+0

Guinea-Bissau	0–6	Burkina Faso
		Nana 16', 42'; Kabré 40'; Congo 41'; Rouamba 82'; Nikiéma 85'

Estádio 24 de Setembro, Bissau
Referee: Zomadre Sonia Kore (Ivory Coast)
23 February 2022
17:00 UTC+1

Burkina Faso	0–0	Guinea-Bissau
Nana 11'

Stade Charles de Gaulle, Porto-Novo (Benin)
Referee: Patience Madu (Nigeria)

Burkina Faso won 7–0 on aggregate.

18 February 2022
16:00 UTC+1

Nigeria	2–0	Ivory Coast
Onumonu 21', 56'

Moshood Abiola National Stadium, Abuja
Referee: Jacqueline Nikiéma (Burkina Faso)
23 February 2022
16:00 UTC+0

Ivory Coast	0–1	Nigeria
		Okoronkwo 87'

Robert Champroux Stadium, Abidjan
Referee: Zouwaira Souley Sani (Niger)

Nigeria won 3–0 on aggregate.

== Qualified teams ==
The following 12 teams qualified for the group stages.

Team	Qualified on	Previous appearances in the Women's Africa Cup of Nations^{1}
Morocco (hosts)	15 January 2021	2 (1998, 2000)
Uganda	28 January 2022	1 (2000)
Burundi	21 February 2022	0 (Debut)
Zambia	22 February 2022	3 (1995, 2014, 2018)
Senegal	22 February 2022	1 (2012)
Togo	23 February 2022	0 (Debut)
Tunisia	23 February 2022	1 (2008)
Burkina Faso	23 February 2022	0 (Debut)
Botswana	23 February 2022	0 (Debut)
Cameroon	23 February 2022	12 (1991, 1998, 2000, 2002, 2004, 2006, 2008, 2010, 2012, 2014, 2016, 2018)
Nigeria	23 February 2022	13 (**1991**, **1995**, **1998**, **2000**, **2002**, **2004**, **2006**, 2008, **2010**, 2012, **2014**, **2016**, **2018**)
South Africa	23 February 2022	12 (1995, 1998, 2000, 2002, 2004, 2006, 2008, 2010, 2012, 2014, 2016, 2018)

^{1} Bold indicates champions for that year. Italic indicates hosts for that year.

== Goalscorers ==
There were 218 goals scored in 58 matches, for an average of 3.76 goals per match.

6 goals

- (Kenya) Neddy Atieno
- (Tunisia) Mariem Houij

5 goals

- (Burundi) Rukiya Bizimana
- (Burundi) Aniella Uwimana
- (Namibia) Zenatha Coleman
- (South Africa) Linda Motlhalo

4 goals

- (Algeria) Naïma Bouhani
- (Botswana) Lesego Radiakanyo
- (Ivory Coast) Ida Guehai
- (Ivory Coast) Rosemonde Kouassi
- (Kenya) Jentrix Shikangwa
- (Senegal) Nguenar Ndiaye
- (Togo) Odette Gnintegma

3 goals

- (Algeria) Sylia Koui
- (Botswana) Refilwe Tholakele
- (Burkina Faso) Juliette Nana
- (Burundi) Asha Djafari
- (Kenya) Mwanalima Adam
- (Senegal) Mama Diop
- (South Africa) Hildah Magaia
- (Tunisia) Sabrine Ellouzi
- (Tunisia) Ella Kaabachi
- (Zimbabwe) Priviledge Mupeti

2 goals

- (Algeria) Wissem Bouzid
- (Algeria) Amira Ould Braham
- (Botswana) Mokgabo Thanda
- (Burkina Faso) Charlotte Millogo
- (Burkina Faso) Limata Nikiéma
- (Burundi) Joëlle Bukuru
- (Burundi) Sandrine Niyonkuru
- (Cameroon) Flora Kameni
- (Cameroon) Ajara Nchout
- (Cameroon) Genevieve Ngo Mbeleck
- (Equatorial Guinea) Elena Obono
- (Gabon) Jessy Obiang
- (Ivory Coast) Fatou Coulibaly
- (Ivory Coast) Rebecca Elloh
- (Ivory Coast) Ange N'Guessan
- (Ivory Coast) Ines Nrehy
- (Mali) Agueissa Diarra
- (Mali) Aissata Traoré
- (Nigeria) Uchenna Kanu
- (Nigeria) Ifeoma Onumonu
- (Senegal) Awa Diakhaté
- (South Africa) Gabriela Salgado
- (Zambia) Racheal Kundananji
- (Zimbabwe) Emmaculate Msipa
- (Zimbabwe) Marjory Nyaumwe

1 goal

- (Algeria) Fatima Bara
- (Algeria) Lydia Belkacemi
- (Algeria) Imène Merrouche
- (Angola) Ngonguinha
- (Benin) Nadège Atanhloueto
- (Benin) Léa Fachinan
- (Botswana) Thuto Ramafifi
- (Burkina Faso) Adama Congo
- (Burkina Faso) Adele Kabré
- (Burkina Faso) Madinatou Rouamba
- (Burkina Faso) Balkissa Sawadogo
- (Burkina Faso) Fatoumata Tamboura
- (Cameroon) Rose Bella
- (Cameroon) Eliane Bodolo
- (Cameroon) Tatiana Ewodo Ekogo
- (Cameroon) Claudine Meffometou
- (Cameroon) Gabrielle Onguéné
- (Cameroon) Kévine Ossol
- (Cameroon) Jeannette Yango
- (Republic of the Congo) Vanella Loufoua
- (Republic of the Congo) Aïcha Yamounou
- (Djibouti) Lerman Abdo
- (Egypt) Dana Nadda
- (Egypt) Laila Sherif
- (Equatorial Guinea) Anaís
- (Eswatini) Lesego Mokgale
- (Ethiopia) Loza Abera
- (Ethiopia) Senaf Wakuma
- (Gabon) Flora Bikita
- (Gabon) Reine Edzoumou
- (The Gambia) Ola Buwaru
- (The Gambia) Cathrine Jatta
- (The Gambia) Ruggy Joof
- (The Gambia) Fatou Kanteh
- (Ghana) Princella Adubea
- (Guinea) Mabinty Camara
- (Guinea-Bissau) Adama Mané
- (Guinea-Bissau) Tchaloda Man
- (Ivory Coast) Jessica Aby
- (Ivory Coast) Binta Diakité
- (Ivory Coast) Bernadette Kakounan
- (Ivory Coast) Inès Konan
- (Kenya) Lydia Akoth
- (Kenya) Janet Bundi
- (Liberia) Lucy Kikeh
- (Malawi) Wezzie Mvula
- (Malawi) Asimenye Simwaka
- (Malawi) Sabinah Thom
- (Mali) Binta Diarra
- (Namibia) Emma Naris
- (Nigeria) Esther Okoronkwo
- (Sierra Leone) Zainab Macauley
- (South Africa) Noxolo Cesane
- (South Africa) Sibulele Holweni
- (South Africa) Refiloe Jane
- (South Africa) Thembi Kgatlana
- (South Africa) Bambanani Mbane
- (South Africa) Janine van Wyk
- (South Sudan) Amy Lasu
- (Tanzania) Stumai Athumani
- (Tanzania) Opa Clement
- (Tanzania) Mwanahamisi Shurua
- (Togo) Reine Gake
- (Togo) Yawa Konou
- (Togo) Koudjoukalo Sama
- (Togo) Mafille Woedikou
- (Togo) Takiyatou Yaya
- (Tunisia) Samia Aouni
- (Tunisia) Leïla Maknoun
- (Uganda) Riticia Nabbosa
- (Uganda) Fauzia Najjemba
- (Zambia) Grace Chanda
- (Zambia) Siomara Mapepa
- (Zambia) Lushomo Mweemba
- (Zimbabwe) Shyline Dambamuromo
- (Zimbabwe) Maudy Mafuruse

1 own goal

- (Mali) Coulouba Sogoré (against Guinea)
- (Sudan) Amina Oum Srir (against Algeria)
