= List of African women's national football team managers =

This list of African women's national football team managers encompasses every manager who currently manages a women's national team under the control of Confederation of African Football (CAF).

== Managers ==
Country	Manager	Appointed	Time as manager	Ref
Union of North African Football
Algeria	(France) Farid Benstiti	28 December 2022	3 years, 228 days	
Egypt	(Egypt) Mohamed Kamal	18 February 2026	176 days	
Libya	(Libya) Naji Ajbara	Unknown		
Morocco	(Spain) Jorge Vilda	12 October 2023	2 years, 305 days	
Tunisia	(Tunisia) Walid Garoum	10 March 2026	156 days	
West African Football Union — Zone A
Cape Verde	(Cape Verde) Silvéria Nédio "Nita"	23 October 2018	7 years, 294 days	
The Gambia	(The Gambia) Mariama Sowe	26 January 2025	1 year, 199 days	
Guinea	(Guinea) Kaman Camara	Unknown		
Guinea-Bissau	(Guinea-Bissau) Domingos Na Fatcha	Unknown		
Liberia	(Ethiopia) Selam Kebede	26 July 2023	3 years, 18 days	
Mali	(Mali) Birama Konaté	27 August 2025	351 days	
Mauritania	(Spain) Jordi Arimany	6 November 2023	2 years, 280 days	
Senegal	(Senegal) Serigne Cissé	11 December 2019	6 years, 245 days	
Sierra Leone	(Sierra Leone) Hassan Mansaray	24 October 2021	4 years, 293 days	
West African Football Union — Zone B
Benin	(Benin) Abdoulaye Ouzérou	Unknown		
Burkina Faso	(Burkina Faso) Pascal Sawadogo	14 September 2021	4 years, 333 days	
Ghana	(Sweden) Kim Björkegren	14 January 2025	1 year, 211 days	
Ivory Coast	(France) Reynald Pedros	21 January 2025	1 year, 204 days	
Niger	(Niger) Ali Mamadou	Unknown		
Nigeria	(Nigeria) Justine Madugu	26 September 2024	1 year, 321 days	
Togo	(Togo) Kaï Tomety	8 January 2018	8 years, 217 days	
Central African Football Federations' Union
Cameroon	(Cameroon) Alain Djeumfa	9 December 2025	247 days	
Central African Republic	(Central African Republic) Étienne Momokoamas	Unknown		
Chad	(Chad) André Mahamat	Unknown		
Congo	(Republic of the Congo) Berjona Mbemba	20 September 2019	6 years, 327 days	
DR Congo	(Democratic Republic of the Congo) Mihayo Kazembe	16 October 2025	301 days	
Equatorial Guinea	(Spain) Guillermo Ganet	14 January 2025	1 year, 211 days	
Gabon	(Gabon) Tristan Mombo	13 April 2016	10 years, 122 days	
São Tomé and Príncipe	Regina Trindade	Unknown		
Council for East and Central Africa Football Associations
Burundi	(Burundi) Olivier Niyungeko	Unknown		
Djibouti	(Togo) Jonas Komla	6 January 2025	1 year, 219 days	
Eritrea	(Eritrea) Mekonnen Zewdie	Unknown		
Ethiopia	(Ethiopia) Yosef Gebrewold	17 January 2025	1 year, 208 days	
Kenya	(Kenya) Beldine Odemba	2 September 2023	2 years, 345 days	
Rwanda	(Uganda) André Mbungo	2 March 2025	1 year, 164 days	
South Sudan	(South Sudan) Simon Yor	18 February 2025	1 year, 176 days	
Sudan	(Sudan) Farouk Jabra	25 May 2021	5 years, 80 days	
Tanzania	(Tanzania) Bakari Shime	4 May 2018	8 years, 101 days	
Uganda	(South Africa) Sheryl Botes	15 November 2023	2 years, 271 days	
Council of Southern Africa Football Associations
Angola	(Angola) Afonso Paxe	13 February 2026	181 days	
Botswana	(Botswana) Gaolethoo Nkutlwisang	14 February 2026	180 days	
Comoros	(Comoros) Youssouf Abdallah	11 February 2026	183 days	
Eswatini	(Eswatini) Bongani Makhukhula	Unknown		
Lesotho	(Lesotho) Shalane Lehohla	Unknown		
Madagascar	(Madagascar) Émile Randriamirado	Unknown		
Malawi	(Malawi) Lovemore Fazili	19 August 2022	3 years, 359 days	
Mauritius	(Mauritius) Kersley Levrai	18 April 2023	3 years, 117 days	
Mozambique	(Mozambique) Luís Fumo	3 May 2025	1 year, 102 days	
Namibia	(Namibia) Lucky Kakuva	24 September 2025	323 days	
Seychelles	(Singapore) Chris Yip-Au	22 September 2023	2 years, 325 days	
South Africa	(South Africa) Desiree Ellis	13 October 2016	9 years, 304 days	
Zambia	(Switzerland) Nora Häuptle	4 January 2025	1 year, 221 days	
Zimbabwe	(Zimbabwe) Sithethelelwe Sibanda	23 September 2024	1 year, 324 days	

== See also ==
- List of Asian women's national football team managers
- List of European women's national football team managers
