= Lígia Santos =

Santomean football manager

Personal information
- Place of birth: Portugal

Senior career*
Years	Team	Apps	(Gls)
- Anadia

Managerial career
- São Tomé and Príncipe
- * Club domestic league appearances and goals

Lígia Santos is a Santomean football manager who manages the São Tomé and Príncipe women's national football team.

== Early life ==
Santos is the daughter of Portuguese footballer José Santos.

== Education ==
Santos attended Westchester Community College in the United States.

== Career ==
Santos is the first female football manager in São Tomé and Príncipe and managed the São Tomé and Príncipe women's national football team for 2024 Women's Africa Cup of Nations qualification. She also manages the under-20 team.

== Personal life ==
Santos is nicknamed "Pipi".
