= Mafille Woedikou =

Togolese footballer (born 1994)

Personal information
- Full name: Afi Apeafa Woedikou
- Date of birth: 15 July 1994 (age 32)
- Place of birth: Agoè Nyivé, Togo
- Height: 1.71 m (5 ft 7 in)
- Position: Forward

Team information
- Current team: Thonon Évian

Senior career*
Years	Team	Apps	(Gls)
–2019	Athléta		
2019–2020	Trois Cités		
2020–2021	Auxerre		
2021–2022	Yzeure	18	(5)
2022–2023	Strasbourg	17	(3)
2023–2024	Nantes	10	(0)
2024–	Thonon Évian	3	(0)

International career^{‡}
2018–	Togo	11	(14)
- * Club domestic league appearances and goals as of 21 March 2025 ‡ National team caps and goals as of 26 September 2023 (UTC)

Afi Apeafa "Mafille" Woedikou (born 15 July 1994) is a Togolese footballer who plays as a forward for Greek A Division club GPO Kastoria and the Togo women's national team.

== Club career ==
Woedikou has played for Athléta FC in Togo and for ES Trois Cités Poitiers, AJ Auxerre and FF Yzeure Allier Auvergne in France.

== International career ==
Woedikou capped for Togo at senior level during the 2022 Africa Women Cup of Nations qualification.

=== International goals ===
Scores and results list Togo's goal tally first.

No.	Date	Venue	Opponent	Score	Result	Competition
1.	19 February 2018	Stade Robert Champroux, Abidjan, Ivory Coast	Nigeria	1–3	1–3	2018 WAFU Zone B Women's Cup
2.	13 May 2019	Stade Robert Champroux, Abidjan, Ivory Coast	Senegal	1–0	2–1	2019 WAFU Zone B Women's Cup
3.	13 May 2019	Stade Robert Champroux, Abidjan, Ivory Coast	Senegal	2–1	2–1	2019 WAFU Zone B Women's Cup
4.	18 October 2021	Estádio Nacional 12 de Julho, São Tomé, São Tomé and Príncipe	São Tomé and Príncipe	2–0	5–0	2022 Africa Cup of Nations qualification
5.	29 June 2022	Marrakesh Stadium, Marrakesh, Morocco	Botswana	1–0	1–1	Friendly
6.	6 July 2022	Stade Mohammed V, Casablanca, Morocco	Cameroon	1–0	1–1	2022 Africa Cup of Nations
7.	9 July 2022	Stade Moulay Hassan, Rabat, Morocco	Zambia	1–2	1–4	2022 Africa Cup of Nations
8.	22 September 2023	Stade de Kégué, Lomé, Togo	Djibouti	1–0	7–0	2024 Africa Cup of Nations qualification
9.	22 September 2023	Stade de Kégué, Lomé, Togo	Djibouti	4–0	7–0	2024 Africa Cup of Nations qualification
10.	22 September 2023	Stade de Kégué, Lomé, Togo	Djibouti	6–0	7–0	2024 Africa Cup of Nations qualification
11.	22 September 2023	Stade de Kégué, Lomé, Togo	Djibouti	7–0	7–0	2024 Africa Cup of Nations qualification
12.	26 September 2023	Stade de Kégué, Lomé, Togo	Djibouti	1–0	6–0	2024 Africa Cup of Nations qualification
13.	26 September 2023	Stade de Kégué, Lomé, Togo	Djibouti	2–0	6–0	2024 Africa Cup of Nations qualification
14.	26 September 2023	Stade de Kégué, Lomé, Togo	Djibouti	4–0	6–0	2024 Africa Cup of Nations qualification
Last updated 15 November 2023
