= List of Asian women's national football team managers =

This is a list of Asian women's national football team managers. This encompasses every manager who currently manages a women's national team under the control of Asian Football Confederation (AFC).

== Managers ==
As of April 2026

Default sorting is descending by time as manager.

Country	Manager	Appointed	Time as Manager	Ref.
South Korea	(South Korea) Shin Sang-woo	11 October 2024	1 year, 197 days	
Australia	(Australia) Joe Montemurro	2 June 2025	328 days	
Indonesia	(Japan) Satoru Mochizuki	8 April 2026	18 days	
Iran	(Iran) Marziyeh Jafari	23 April 2025	1 year, 3 days	
India	(India) Crispin Chettri	7 April 2026	18 days	
Japan	(Japan) Michihisa Kano (interim)	2 April 2026	24 days	
Philippines	(Australia) Mark Torcaso	23 August 2023	2 years, 246 days	
China	(Australia) Ante Milicic	11 March 2024	2 years, 46 days	
Guam	(Guam) Kimberly Sherman	December 2024	1 year, 146 days	
Afghanistan	(Afghanistan)			
Bahrain	(Bahrain) Adnan Hussain			
Bangladesh	(England) Peter Butler			
Bhutan	(South Korea) Kim Tae-in			
Brunei	(Brunei)			
Cambodia	(Japan) Koji Gyotoku			
Chinese Taipei	(Thailand) Prasobchoke Chokemor			
Hong Kong	(Brazil) José Ricardo Rambo			
Iraq	(Iraq) Abdul-Wahab Abu Al-Hail			
Jordan	(Portugal) David Nascimento			
Kuwait	Vacant			
Kyrgyzstan	(Kyrgyzstan) Nematjan Zakirov			
Laos	(South Korea) Jong Song-chon			
Lebanon	(Lebanon) Wael Gharzeddine			
Macau	(South Korea) Meng Jun			
Maldives	(Maldives) Mohamed Athif			
Mongolia	(Mongolia) Sandagdorjiin Erdenebat			
Myanmar	(South Korea) Byun Sung-hwan			
Nepal	(Nepal) Nabin Neupane			
North Korea	(North Korea) Ri Song-ho			
Northern Mariana Islands	(Malaysia) Koo Luam Khen			
Oman	(Oman) Rasheed Jabar			
Pakistan	(Pakistan) Adeel Rizki			
Palestine	(Palestine) Ahmed Sharf			
Qatar	Vacant			
Saudi Arabia	(Spain) Lluís Cortés			
Singapore	(Morocco) Karim Bencherifa			
Sri Lanka	(Sri Lanka) Abdullah Al Mutairi			
Syria	(Syria) Salim Jablawi			
Tajikistan	(Tajikistan) Mubin Ergashev			
Thailand	(Thailand) Natipong Sritong-In			
Timor-Leste	(Indonesia) Emral Bustamam			
Turkmenistan	(Turkmenistan) Boris Borowik			
United Arab Emirates	Vera Pauw			
Uzbekistan	(Lithuania) Kotryna Kulbytė			
Vietnam	(Vietnam) vacant			
Yemen	Vacant			

== See also ==
- List of Asian national football team managers
- List of European women's national football team managers
- List of African women's national football team managers
