= Neddy Atieno =

Kenyan footballer (born 1992)

Personal information
- Full name: Neddy Atieno Okoth
- Date of birth: 8 July 1992 (age 34)
- Position: Forward

Senior career*
Years	Team	Apps	(Gls)
- Makolanders
2017–2021	Ulinzi		

International career
2014–2021	Kenya		
- * Club domestic league appearances and goals

Neddy Atieno Okoth (born 8 July 1992), known as Neddy Atieno, is a Kenyan former footballer who plays as a forward for Ulinzi and the Kenya women's national team.

== Club career ==
Atieno joined Ulinzi in 2017 from Makolanders.

Atieno announced her retirement in November 2021 after helping Ulinzi win the FKF Women's Cup and the FKF Super Cup. She later returned in 2023.

== International career ==
At the youth level, Atieno captained the Kenya U20s.

Atieno debuted for the senior national team in 2014. She played in the team's maiden appearance at the Africa Women Cup of Nations in 2016. Atieno also capped for Kenya during the 2018 Africa Women Cup of Nations qualification and 2022 Women's Africa Cup of Nations qualification.

== Personal life ==
In 2018, Atieno started the Neddy for the Needy Initiative, which helps underprivileged children access affordable education.

== See also ==
- List of Kenya women's international footballers
