= Ghoutia Karchouni =

Algerian footballer (born 1995)

Personal information
- Full name: Ghoutia Habiba Karchouni
- Date of birth: 29 May 1995 (age 31)
- Place of birth: Lyon, France
- Height: 1.64 m (5 ft 5 in)
- Position: Midfielder

Team information
- Current team: Servette
- Number: 27

Senior career*
Years	Team	Apps	(Gls)
2013–2016	Paris Saint-Germain	15	(0)
2016	Boston Breakers	3	(0)
2017–2021	Bordeaux	67	(4)
2021–2025	Inter Milan	62	(14)
2025–	Servette	11	(1)

International career
2011	France U16	4	(0)
2011–2012	France U17	19	(1)
2013	France U19	14	(2)
2016	France B	1	(0)
2023–	Algeria	8	(7)
- * Club domestic league appearances and goals as of 06:34, 15 December 2025 (UTC)

Ghoutia Habiba Karchouni (Arabic: غوتيا حبيبة كرشوني; born 29 May 1995) is a professional footballer who plays as a midfielder for Swiss Women's Super League club Servette FC. Born in France, she plays for the Algeria national team. She previously played for Paris Saint-Germain, the Boston Breakers, Bordeaux, and Inter Milan.

== Club career ==
Karchouni joined PSG in 2013. She made her league debut against Arras on 13 October 2013.

On June 29, 2016, Chicago Red Stars acquired a second-round pick in the 2017 NWSL College Draft from the Boston Breakers in exchange for a 2016 international roster spot, which Boston used to sign Karchouni. She made her league debut against FC Kansas City on 28 August 2016.

Karchouni made her league debut against Montpellier on 12 February 2017. She scored her first league goal against PSG on 25 May 2017, scoring in the 48th minute. Karchouni left Bordeaux with her being described as a key player, with one of her goals being nominated for best goal of the season.

On 20 July 2021, Karchouni was announced at Inter Milan on a one-year contract. She made her league debut against Napoli on 28 August 2021. Karchouni scored her first league goal against Empoli on 12 September 2021, scoring a penalty in the 22nd minute. On 31 March 2023, her contract with the club was extended until 30 June 2025. On 8 January 2024, Karchouni underwent surgery due to an ACL injury.

On 23 May 2025, Karchouni joined Swiss club Servette FC.

== International career ==
Karchouni was part of the France squad that played in the 2012 FIFA U-17 Women's World Cup.

Karchouni was part of the France squad that played in the 2013 UEFA Women's Under-19 Championship. She played in the final as France beat England U19s 2–0.

In 2023, Karchouni, who had previously represented the French team, made the decision to switch her allegiance and join the Algerian national team. Consequently, she was called up to participate in two matches with the Algerian team against Tanzania, which took place from April 9 to 11, 2023.

== International goals ==
Scores and results list Algeria's goal tally first, score column indicates score after each Karchouni goal.

List of international goals scored by Ghoutia Karchouni
No.	Date	Venue	Opponent	Score	Result	Competition
1	9 April 2023	Nelson Mandela Stadium, Algiers, Algeria	Tanzania	2–0	4–0	International Friendly
2	9 April 2023	Nelson Mandela Stadium, Algiers, Algeria	Tanzania	3–0	4–0	International Friendly
3	20 September 2023	FUFA Technical Center, Jinja, Uganda	Uganda	2–0	2–1	2024 Africa Cup of Nations qualification
4	30 November 2024	Mustapha Tchaker Stadium, Blida, Algeria	Uganda	1–0	1–0	International Friendly
5	19 February 2025	Juba, South Sudan	South Sudan	5–0	0–5	2026 WAFCON qualifying
6	25 February 2025	Mustapha Tchaker Stadium, Blida, Algeria	South Sudan	1–0	3–0	2026 WAFCON qualifying
7	25 February 2025	Mustapha Tchaker Stadium, Blida, Algeria	South Sudan	3–0	3–0	2026 WAFCON qualifying
