= Sylia Koui =

Algerian footballer (born 1992)

Personal information
- Date of birth: 27 July 1992 (age 34)
- Place of birth: Saint-Denis, France
- Height: 1.69 m (5 ft 7 in)
- Position: Midfielder

Youth career
- 2000–2003: Courtilières FC
- 2003–2006: Blanc-Mesnil SF

Senior career*
Years	Team	Apps	(Gls)
2006–2009	Blanc-Mesnil SF	35	(1)
2009–2013	Le Mans	70	(5)
2013–2014	Yzeure	22	(1)
2014–2016	Tremblay FC	39	(2)
2016–2019	Rouen	44	(6)
2019–2022	Le Havre	56	(3)
2022–2024	Nantes	40	(4)
Total		306	(22)

International career^{‡}
2020–2024	Algeria	14	(4)
- * Club domestic league appearances and goals as of 26 May 2024 ‡ National team caps and goals as of 3 June 2024

Sylia Koui (Arabic: سيليا كوي; born 27 July 1992) is a former professional footballer who played as a midfielder. Born in France, she played for the Algeria national team.

== Early life ==
Koui was born in Saint-Denis a subprefecture of the department of Seine-Saint-Denis. Her parents are originally from Tigzirt in Algeria. She started playing football at the age of eight in the Courtilières FC club. At the age of eleven, she joined the women's team of Blanc-Mesnil SF, where she made her first appearance in the Division 2 Féminine at the age of fourteen.

== Club career ==
In 2009, at the age of seventeen, she joined Le Mans FC for four seasons. During her time there, she contributed to the promotion to Division 1 Féminine in the 2009–2010 season, finishing as D2 champion. However, the following year, at the end of the 2010–2011 season, the club was relegated back to D2. Following her signing with FF Yzeure Allier Auvergne in 2013, she played in the 2013–14 Division 1 Féminine. 2014 also saw her return to the Parisian suburbs where she played two seasons with Tremblay FC in D2. after two seasons in the club she moved to Division 2 side FC Rouen for three seasons.

In 2019, Le Harve AC announced the signing of Koui for the 2019–20 season. where the contract was later renewed till 2022. Afterward, she joined Division 2's club FC Nantes. Playing for Nantes for two seasons, she contributed the club's historic promotion to the Première Ligue. Her brace on the final matchday against ASPTT Albi was crucial in securing their historic promotion.

On 27 May 2024, Koui announced her retirement from professional football after achieving promotion to Première Ligue with the club.

== International career ==
In March 2020, Koui was called up for the first time to the Algerian national team to participate in a training camp in preparation for the first qualifying round of the 2020 Women's Africa Cup of Nations qualification. The competition was later canceled due to the COVID-19 pandemic.

She was selected again in October 2021 by coach Radia Fertoul to participate in a double-legged qualifier match against Sudan as a part of the 2022 Women's Africa Cup of Nations qualification. On 20 October 2021, Sylia earned her first cap after she made her first appearance as a starter and scored a brace in the historic 14–0 victory against Sudan. On 3 June 2024, She made her final appearance for the team in a friendly against local club CF Akbou.

== Career statistics ==
=== Club ===
As of match played 26 May 2024

Appearances and goals by club, season and competition
Club	Season	League			Cup		Continental		Other		Total	
Club	Season	Division	Apps	Goals	Apps	Goals	Apps	Goals	Apps	Goals	Apps	Goals
Blanc-Mesnil SF	2006–07	Division 2 Féminine	1	0	–	–	—		—		1	0
Blanc-Mesnil SF	2007–08	Division 2 Féminine	17	0	1	0	—		—		18	0
Blanc-Mesnil SF	2008–09	Division 3 Féminine	15	1	1	0	—		—		16	1
Blanc-Mesnil SF	Total		33	1	2	0	—		—		35	1
Le Mans FC B	2009–10	Division 3 Féminine	13	0	–	–	—		—		13	0
Le Mans FC	2010–11	Division 1 Féminine	14	0	3	0	—		—		17	0
Le Mans FC	2011–12	Division 2 Féminine	22	3	2	2	—		—		24	5
Le Mans FC	2012–13	Division 2 Féminine	15	0	1	0	—		—		16	0
Le Mans FC	Total		64	3	6	2	—		—		70	5
FF Yzeure	2013–14	Division 1 Féminine	22	1	–	–	—		—		22	1
FF Yzeure	Total		22	1	–	–	—		—		22	1
Tremblay FC	2014–15	Division 2 Féminine	22	1	2	0	—		—		24	1
Tremblay FC	2015–16	Division 2 Féminine	15	1	–	–	—		—		15	1
Tremblay FC	Total		37	2	2	0	—		—		39	2
FC Rouen	2016–17	Division 2 Féminine	21	3	–	–	—		—		21	3
FC Rouen	2017–18	Division 2 Féminine	21	3	1	0	—		—		22	3
FC Rouen	2018–19	Division 2 Féminine	–	–	1	0	—		—		1	0
FC Rouen	Total		42	6	2	0	—		—		44	6
Le Harve AC	2019–20	Division 2 Féminine	14	0	3	0	—		—		17	0
Le Harve AC	2020–21	Division 1 Féminine	16	1	1	0	—		—		17	1
Le Harve AC	2021–22	Division 2 Féminine	18	1	4	1	—		—		22	2
Le Harve AC	Total		48	2	8	1	—		—		56	3
Nantes	2022–23	Division 2 Féminine	13	0	2	0	—		—		15	0
Nantes	2023–24	Division 2 Féminine	22	3	3	1	—		—		25	4
Nantes	Total		35	3	5	1	—		—		40	4
Career total			281	18	25	4	—		—		306	22

=== International ===
As of match played 3 June 2024

Appearances and goals by national team and year
National team	Year	Apps	Goals
Algeria	2020	0	0
Algeria	2021	3	3
Algeria	2022	2	1
Algeria	2023	5	0
Algeria	2024	4	0
Total		14	4

==== International goals ====
#	Date	Venue	Opponent	Score	Result	Competition
1	20 October 2021	Omar Hamadi Stadium, Algiers, Algeria	Sudan	3–0	14–0	2022 Africa Cup of Nations qualification
2	20 October 2021	Omar Hamadi Stadium, Algiers, Algeria	Sudan	12–0	14–0	2022 Africa Cup of Nations qualification
3	28 November 2021	Stade de Ariana, Ariana, Tunisia	Tunisia	2–0	4–2	International Friendly
4	23 February 2022	Stade Omar Hamadi, Algiers, Algeria	South Africa	1–0	1–1	2022 Africa Cup of Nations qualification

== Honours ==
Le Mans FC

- Division 2 Féminine Champions: 2009–10
