= List of European women's national football team managers =

This is a list of European women's national football team managers. This encompasses every manager who currently manages a women's national team under the control of UEFA.

== Managers ==
Last update: 12 April 2026. Default sorting is descending by time as manager.

Team	Manager	Appointed	Time as manager	Ref
Portugal	(Portugal) Francisco Neto	25 February 2014	12 years, 60 days	
Albania	(Albania) Armir Grimaj	22 April 2016	10 years, 4 days	
Montenegro	(Montenegro) Mirko Marić	25 December 2017	8 years, 122 days	
Slovakia	(Slovakia) Peter Kopúň	27 June 2018	7 years, 303 days	
Azerbaijan	(Azerbaijan) Siyasat Asgarov	4 October 2019	6 years, 204 days	
Turkey	(Turkey) Necla Güngör	1 January 2020	6 years, 115 days	
England	(Netherlands) Sarina Wiegman	14 August 2020	5 years, 255 days	
Russia	(Russia) Yuri Krasnozhan	30 December 2020	5 years, 117 days	
Iceland	(Iceland) Þorsteinn Halldórsson	28 January 2021	5 years, 88 days	
Poland	(Poland) Nina Patalon	29 April 2021	4 years, 362 days	
Croatia	(Croatia) Nenad Gračan	15 November 2021	4 years, 162 days	
Finland	(Finland) Marko Saloranta	25 November 2022	3 years, 152 days	
Malta	(Italy) Manuela Tesse	15 December 2022	3 years, 132 days	
Georgia	(Israel) Iris Antman	10 April 2023	3 years, 16 days	
Liechtenstein	(Switzerland) Adrienne Krysl	27 June 2023	2 years, 303 days	
Italy	(Italy) Andrea Soncin	8 September 2023	2 years, 230 days	
Slovenia	(Slovenia) Saša Kolman	15 September 2023	2 years, 223 days	
Norway	(England) Gemma Grainger	10 January 2024	2 years, 106 days	
Andorra	(Spain) Albert Panadero	12 January 2024	2 years, 104 days	
Wales	(Canada) Rhian Wilkinson	27 February 2024	2 years, 58 days	
Moldova	(Moldova) Ghenadie Puşcă	1 March 2024	2 years, 56 days	
Germany	(Germany) Christian Wück	8 March 2024	2 years, 49 days	
Romania	(Italy) Massimo Pedrazzini	15 March 2024	2 years, 42 days	
Bosnia and Herzegovina	(Bosnia and Herzegovina) Selver Hodžić	16 March 2024	2 years, 41 days	
North Macedonia	(North Macedonia) Aleksandar Andov	19 March 2024	2 years, 38 days	
Hungary	(Hungary) Alexandra Szarvas	21 March 2024	2 years, 36 days	
France	(France) Laurent Bonadei	23 August 2024	1 year, 246 days	
Cyprus	(Cyprus) Renos Demetriades	17 October 2024	1 year, 191 days	
Kosovo	(Kosovo) Sami Sermaxhaj	21 October 2024	1 year, 196 days	
Serbia	(Serbia) Lidija Stojkanović	17 December 2024	1 year, 130 days	
Estonia	(Estonia) Aleksandra Ševoldajeva	4 November 2024	1 year, 173 days	
Lithuania	(Lithuania) Tomas Ražanauskas	13 January 2025	1 year, 103 days	
Republic of Ireland	(England) Carla Ward	15 January 2025	1 year, 101 days	
Latvia	(Latvia) Liene Vāciete	17 January 2025	1 year, 99 days	
Belgium	(Iceland) Elísabet Gunnarsdóttir	20 January 2025	1 year, 96 days	
Austria	(Austria) Alexander Schriebl	21 January 2025	1 year, 95 days	
Czech Republic	(Czech Republic) Jitka Klimková	21 January 2025	1 year, 95 days	
Sweden	(Sweden) Tony Gustavsson	6 February 2025	1 year, 79 days	
Scotland	(Australia) Melissa Andreatta	9 April 2025	1 year, 17 days	
Netherlands	(Netherlands) Arjan Veurink	15 April 2025	1 year, 11 days	
Denmark	(Denmark) Jakob Michelsen	4 June 2025	326 days	
Faroe Islands	(Faroe Islands) Pætur Clementsen	4 June 2025	326 days	
Spain	(Spain) Sonia Bermúdez	11 August 2025	258 days	
Belarus	(Belarus) Viachaslau Hryharau	22 August 2025	247 days	
Gibraltar	(Croatia) Stella Gotal	3 September 2025	235 days	
Greece	(Greece) Vassileios Spertos	3 November 2025	174 days	
Switzerland	(Spain) Rafel Navarro	4 November 2025	173 days	
Bulgaria	(Bulgaria) Kaloyan Petkov	30 January 2026	86 days	
Israel	(Israel) Menahem Koretzki	8 February 2026	77 days	
Ukraine	(Ukraine) Iya Andrushchak	9 February 2026	76 days	
Kazakhstan	(Kazakhstan) Begaim Kirgizbaeva	24 February 2026	61 days	
Northern Ireland	(Scotland) Michael McArdle	9 March 2026	48 days	
Armenia	(Armenia) Mariam Stepanyan	16 March 2026	41 days	
Luxembourg	(Luxembourg) Cristina Correia (Germany) Daniel Zirbes	24 March 2026	33 days	
San Marino	(Italy) Giulia Domenichetti	8 April 2026	18 days	

== See also ==
- List of African women's national football team managers
- List of Asian women's national football team managers
