= Fatima Bara =

Algerian footballer (born 1990)

Personal information
- Date of birth: 21 February 1990 (age 36)
- Place of birth: El Harrach, Algeria
- Position: Defender

Team information
- Current team: Alger Centre

Senior career*
Years	Team	Apps	(Gls)
2007–	Alger Centre		

International career^{‡}
2014–	Algeria	2	(0)
- * Club domestic league appearances and goals ‡ National team caps and goals as of 20 June 2019

Fatima Bara (Arabic: فطيمة بارة; born 21 February 1990) is an Algerian footballer who plays as a defender for ASE Alger Centre and the Algeria women's national football team.

== Club career ==
Bara has played for Alger Centre in Algeria.

== International career ==
Bara competed for Algeria at the 2018 Africa Women Cup of Nations, playing in two matches.
