= Claudine Meffometou =

Cameroonian footballer (born 1990)

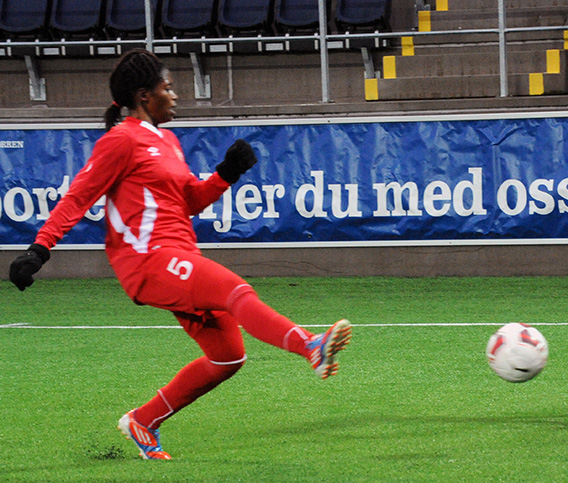
- Meffometou with Zvezda Perm in 2014

Personal information
- Full name: Claudine Falonne Meffometou Tcheno
- Date of birth: 1 July 1990 (age 36)
- Place of birth: Lafé-Baleng, Cameroon
- Height: 1.63 m (5 ft 4 in)
- Position: Defender

Team information
- Current team: Fleury
- Number: 12

Senior career*
Years	Team	Apps	(Gls)
- Franck Rohlicek
2012–2014	ŽFK Spartak Subotica		
2014	Zvezda 2005 Perm	12	(1)
2017–2019	Guingamp	40	(0)
2019–	Fleury	111	(1)

International career^{‡}
2011–	Cameroon	25	(1)
- * Club domestic league appearances and goals as of 05:16, 13 June 2026 (UTC) ‡ National team caps and goals as of 16:50, 23 June 2015 (UTC)

Claudine Falonne Meffometou Tcheno (born 1 July 1990) is a Cameroonian professional footballer who plays as a defender for Première Ligue club Fleury and the Cameroon national team. She has represented her country at the 2012 Summer Olympics and the 2015 FIFA Women's World Cup.

== International goals ==
No.	Date	Venue	Opponent	Score	Result	Competition
1.	17 November 2018	Accra Sports Stadium, Accra, Ghana	Mali	1–1	2–1	2018 Africa Women Cup of Nations

== Honours ==
Zvezda 2005 Perm

- Russian Women's Football Championship: 2014

ŽFK Spartak Subotica

- Serbian Super Liga (women): 2012–13, 2013–14
