= Eugenia Bokoka =

Equatoguinean footballer (born 2002)

Personal information
- Full name: Eugenia Bokoka Mosua
- Date of birth: 3 June 2002 (age 24)
- Place of birth: Malabo, Equatorial Guinea
- Height: 1.75 m (5 ft 9 in)
- Position: Forward

Team information
- Current team: Atlético Malabo

Senior career*
Years	Team	Apps	(Gls)
2016–2017	Estrellas de E'Waiso Ipola		
2018	Real Dona		
2019–2022	Malabo Kings		
2024–	Atlético Malabo		

International career^{‡}
2017	Equatorial Guinea U17		
2019	Equatorial Guinea U20		
2017–2022	Equatorial Guinea	3	(2)
- * Club domestic league appearances and goals ‡ National team caps and goals as of 23 February 2022

Eugenia Bokoka Mosua (born 3 June 2002), also known as Anaís, is an Equatoguinean footballer who plays as a forward for local club Atlético Malabo and the Equatorial Guinea national team.

== International career ==
Bokoka made her senior debut for Equatorial Guinea on 27 November 2017. She also represented the country at under-20 level at the 2019 African Games.

=== International goals ===
Scores and results list Equatorial Guinea's goal tally first

No.	Date	Venue	Opponent	Score	Result	Competition
1	26 November 2017	Estadio de Malabo, Malabo, Equatorial Guinea	Comoros	1–0	4–0	Friendly
