= Kaï Tomety =

Togolese football manager (born 1974)

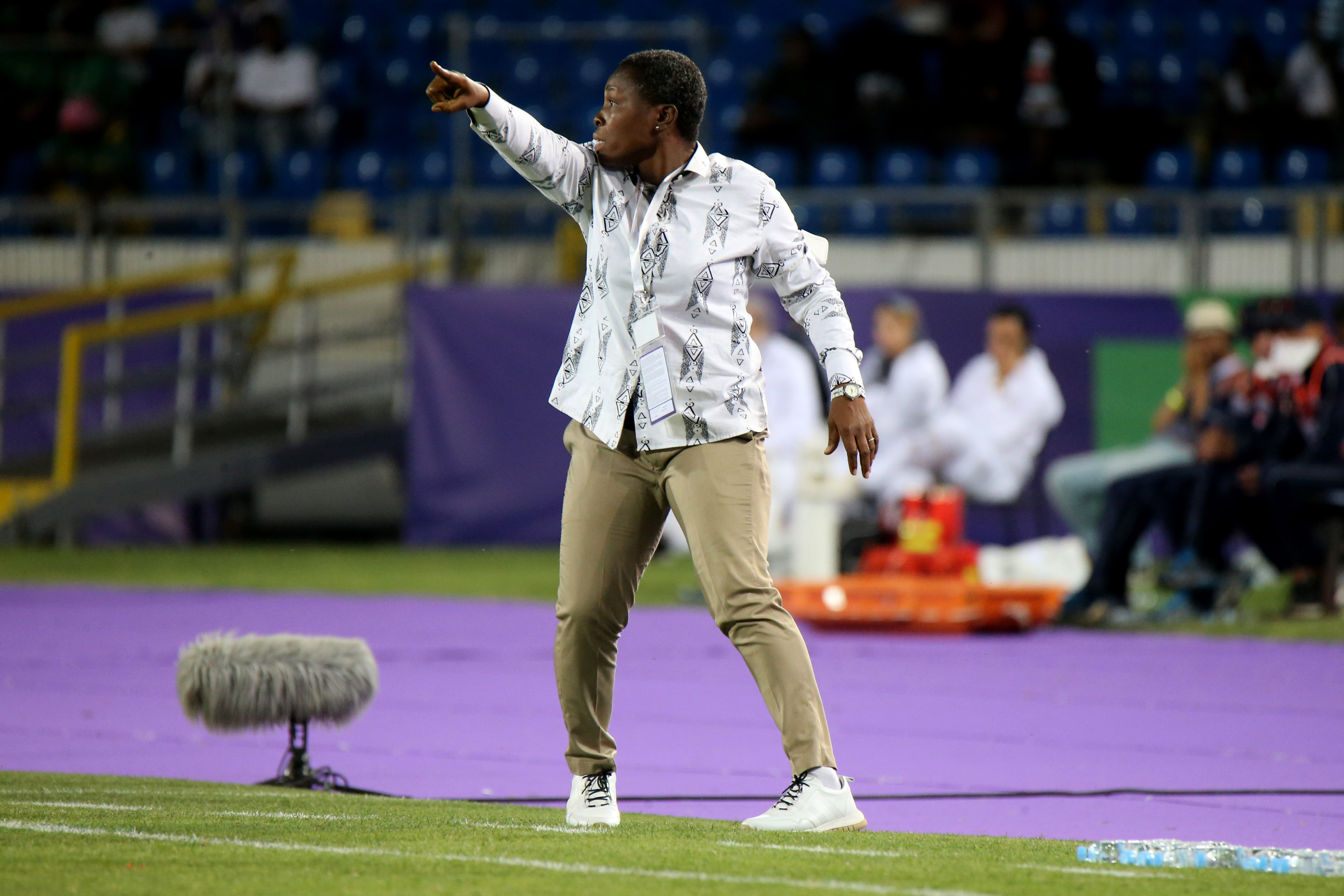

Personal information
- Date of birth: 30 March 1974 (age 52)
- Place of birth: Atakpamé, Togo

Managerial career
- Years: Team
- 2017–: Togo

Kaï Tomety (born 30 March, 1974) is a Togolese football manager who manages the Togo women's national football team.

== Life and career ==
Tomety was born on 30 March, 1974 in Atakpamé, Togo. She worked as a physical education teacher for the Institute National Des Jeunesses Et Sport in Togo. Tomety has also worked for the Togolese National Olympic Committee. She has been described as a "passionate footballer... one of the pioneers of women’s football in Togo and has been one of the best players in her country".

Tomety holds a CAF B License. In 2017, she was appointed manager of the Togo women's national football team, the first female manager of the team. Tomety helped the team qualify for the 2022 Women's Africa Cup of Nations., the team's first major tournament. However, they were unable to qualify for the knockout stages.
