= Lafé-Baleng =

Town and commune in Cameroon

Coordinates: 5.4667°N 10.4167°E

- Commune and town
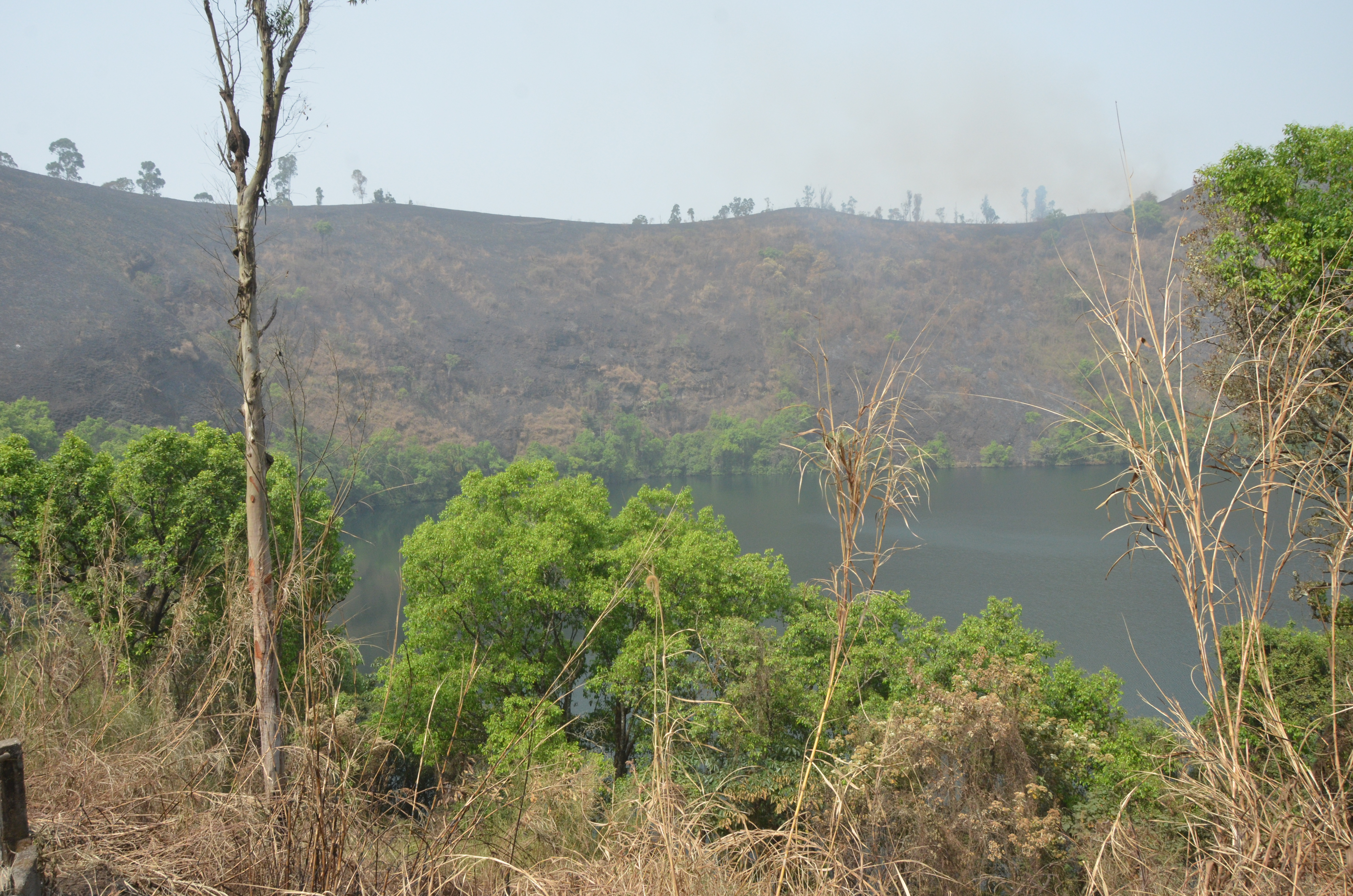
- Baleng Lake
- Interactive map of Lafé-Baleng
- Country: Cameroon
- Time zone: UTC+1 (WAT)

Lafé-Baleng is a town and commune in Cameroon.

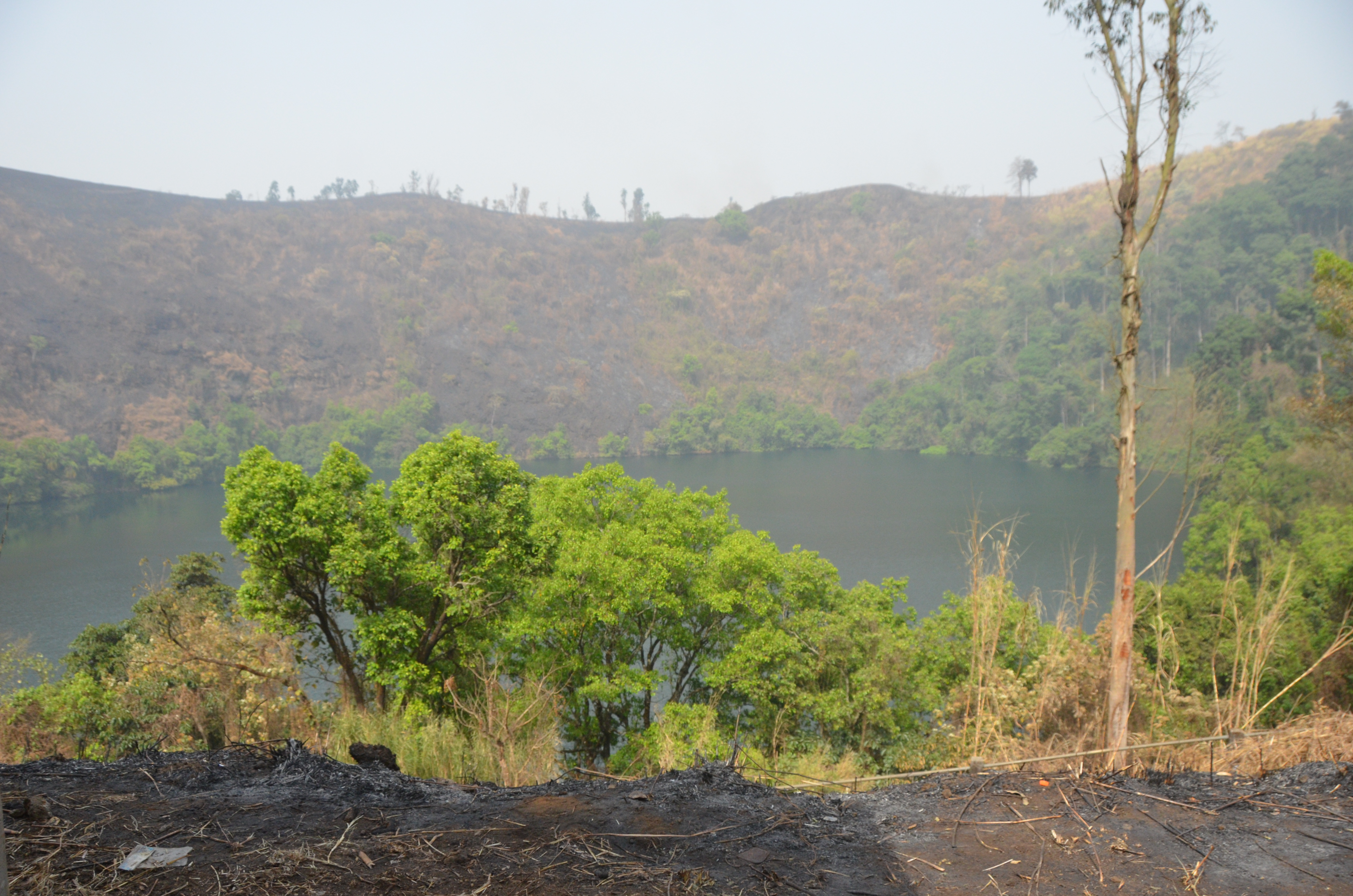
Baleng Lake

== See also ==
- Communes of Cameroon
