= Togo women's national football team =

Women's national association football team representing Togo

Togo
- Nickname(s): Les Éperviers Dames (The Female Sparrowhawks)
- Association: Togolese Football Federation (FTF)
- Confederation: CAF (Africa)
- Sub-confederation: WAFU (West Africa)
- Head coach: Kaï Tomety
- Most caps: Unknown
- Top scorer: Mafille Woedikou (14)
- Home stadium: Stade de Kégué
- FIFA code: TOG
First colours	Second colours

FIFA ranking
- Current: 133 ▲1 (16 June 2026)
- Highest: 115 (March 2022)
- Lowest: 134 (December 2025)

First international
- São Tomé and Príncipe 0–3 Togo (São Tomé and Príncipe, 19 February 2006)

Biggest win
- Djibouti 0–7 Togo (Lomé, Togo; 22 September 2023)

Biggest defeat
- Congo 9–0 Togo (Brazzaville, Republic of the Congo; 12 March 2006)

World Cup
- Appearances: 0

Olympic Games
- Appearances: 0

Africa Women Cup of Nations
- Appearances: 1 (first in 2022)
- Best result: Group stage (2022)

The Togo women's national football team (French: Équipe du Togo féminine de football) represents Togo in international women's football since 2006. It is governed by the Togolese Football Federation (FTF), the governing body of football in Togo. The team has played five FIFA-recognised matches, in 2006 and 2007, before reappearing in the 2018 WAFU Women's Cup, set in Abidjan, Ivory Coast. Their manager since January 2018 is Kaï Tomety. Togo's home stadium is the Stade de Kégué, located in Lomé.

Togo has never qualified for a FIFA World Cup but has qualified for the first Africa Women Cup of Nations in 2022. Currently, they are unranked on the FIFA Women's World Rankings for not having played more than five matches against officially ranked teams.

== History ==
Togo did not compete in their first FIFA-sanctioned match until 2006, when they played five games. In their first game, on 19 February, Togo beat São Tomé and Príncipe 3–0. The team beat São Tomé and Príncipe again by a score of 6–0 on 26 February 2006 in Togo. In its next two games, Togo lost 0–9 and 1–3 to Congo. The team has since played just one match. In 2007, the team competed at the Tournoi de Cinq Nations held in Ouagadougou, Burkina Faso. There, Togo was paired with Mali and Ivory Coast on Pool B. The team lost 0–5 to Ivory Coast before being disqualified for bringing a club team, MBA Lomé, to the competition in violation of tournament rules.

The team was expected to participate in the 2010 African Women's Championship and was scheduled to play against Mali but withdrew before the competition started. The same occurred in the 2016 Africa Women Cup of Nations qualification process, where Togo was drawn with Algeria, but withdrew before playing any game. The team was replaced by Ethiopia, and were excluded from participating in the 2018 edition in Ghana.

Now coached by Kaï Tomety, the Éperviers Dames finally returned to the international competition in the maiden edition of the WAFU Women's Cup, after 11 years of absence. The performance of the new team, however, wasn't good as expected, since they were eliminated in the group stage after suffering heavy defeats to Senegal, Mali and Nigeria. Afi Woedikou scored Togo's only goal in the tournament against the latter, as result of a penalty kick.

== Background and development ==
The national football association, the Togolese Football Federation, was founded in 1960 and became affiliated with FIFA in 1964. The organisation has fifteen staff members focusing on women's football. Football is the fourth-most-popular women's sport in Togo, trailing basketball, handball and volleyball. Football's popularity is growing, however. The country had 380 registered players in 2006, up from 180 in 2000. Women's football was first organised in the country in 2000. By 2006, there were 105 football clubs in Togo, 11 of which were for women only. A national women's competition was created by 2006 and was still operating in 2009. While there are no school, university or regional competitions for women's football, there was an active under-17 women's league in 2009. In 2010, a women's football competition involving 50 women's teams was organised by the German embassy, which provided teams with football kits and footballs.

== Team image ==
=== Home stadium ===
The Togo women's national football team plays their home matches on the Stade de Kégué.

== Results and fixtures ==
The following is a list of match results in the last 12 months, as well as any future matches that have been scheduled.

Win Draw Lose Fixture

=== 2025 ===
24 October 2025 2026 WAFCON qualifying	Burkina Faso	2–0	Togo	Ouagadougou
16:00 UTC+0	R. Sawadogo 65' (pen.); Kabré 89' (pen.)	Report (FIFA)		Stadium: Stade du 4 Août; Referee: Mariétou Fall (Senegal)

28 October 2025 2026 WAFCON qualifying	Togo	0–1	Burkina Faso	Lomé
16:00 UTC+0		Report (FIFA)	Congo 45+4'	Stadium: Stade de Kégué; Referee: Zakia El Grini (Morocco)
Note: Burkina Faso won 3–0 on aggregate.

Source: global sport-

== Coaching staff ==
- The current coaching staff was announced on 8 January 2018.

Position	Name
Manager	(Togo) Kaï Tomety
Assistant manager	Vacant
Goalkeeper coach	(Togo) Dayane Tagoi
Physiotherapist	(Togo) Noufo Tamaka
Intendant	(Togo) Blanche Sewoavi
Trainer	(Togo) Kansame Kammoi-Lare
Media officer	(Togo) Rafietou Tchedre

== Players ==
=== Current squad ===
The following 25 players were called up for the 2026 Women's Africa Cup of Nations qualification against Burkina Faso on 24 and 28 October 2025.

- Match dates: 24 – 28 October 2025
- Opposition: Burkina Faso

No.	Pos.	Player	Date of birth (age)	Club
	GK	Abla Amenyenu	{{{age}}}	(Togolese Football Federation) Sam Nelly
	GK	Adjo Hatto	{{{age}}}	(Togolese Football Federation) AHE FC
	GK	Bilansama Kanda	{{{age}}}	(Togolese Football Federation) Hedjaz Club
	DF	Ramatou Atoukou	{{{age}}}	(Egyptian Football Association) Arab Contractor
	DF	Sonia Zoutepe	{{{age}}}	(Togolese Football Federation) AC Barracuda
	DF	Happy Ziorklui	{{{age}}}	(Togolese Football Federation) CSD Ebenezer
	DF	Ayélé Amemado	{{{age}}}	(Togolese Football Federation) Entente 2
	DF	Folly-Abla Adouoke	{{{age}}}	(Togolese Football Federation) AS OTR
	DF	Bénédite Kouglo	{{{age}}}	(Togolese Football Federation) AC Barracuda
	DF	Akoko Assigno	{{{age}}}	(Togolese Football Federation) AC Barracuda
	DF	Nora Gnamsoum	{{{age}}}	(Togolese Football Federation) AC Barracuda
	DF	Gift Bani	{{{age}}}	(Togolese Football Federation) ASKO FC
	MF	Takiyatou Yaya	{{{age}}}	(Togolese Football Federation) Modern Sport FC
	MF	K. Alice Gbati	{{{age}}}	(Togolese Football Federation) Alamef de Assar
	MF	Koudjoukalo Sama	{{{age}}}	(French Football Federation) Jura Dolois Football
	MF	Nathalie Badate	{{{age}}}	(French Football Federation) Chassieu Décines FC
	MF	Amiratou N'djambara	{{{age}}}	(Togolese Football Federation) Athleta FC
	MF	Odette Gnintegma	{{{age}}}	(Togolese Football Federation) Athleta FC
	MF	Judith Guede	{{{age}}}	(Togolese Football Federation) TDS
	MF	Reine Gake	{{{age}}}	(Togolese Football Federation) AC Barracuda
	MF	Awussi Tassa	{{{age}}}	(Togolese Football Federation) CSD Ebenezer
	FW	Tatiana Kayaba	{{{age}}}	(Togolese Football Federation) ASKO FC
	FW	Rachira Abdou	{{{age}}}	(Togolese Football Federation) AS OTR
	FW	Lucie Gantim	{{{age}}}	(French Football Federation) ES Trois Cités Poitiers
	FW	Nadia Boundjou	{{{age}}}	(Togolese Football Federation) ASKO FC
	FW	Apeafa Woedikou	{{{age}}}	(French Football Federation) Racing Club Saint-Denis

=== Recent call-ups ===
The following players have been called up to a Togo squad in the past 12 months.

Pos.	Player	Date of birth (age)	Caps	Goals	Club	Latest call-up

=== Previous squads ===
Africa Women Cup of Nations

- 2022 Women's Africa Cup of Nations squads

== Individual records ==
- Active players in **bold**, statistics correct **as of 2020**.

=== Most capped players ===
#	Player	Year(s)	Caps

=== Top goalscorers ===
As of 26 September 2023, after the match against Djibouti.

Only includes Togo's scorers from 2018–present.

#	Player	Year(s)	Goals	Caps
1	Mafille Woedikou	2018–Present	14	–
2	Odette Gnintegma	2018–Present	7	–
3	Koudjoukalo Sama	2018–Present	5	–
4	Moussiriétou Adinda-Akpo	2018–Present	4	–
5	Tatiana Kayaba	2023–Present	2	–
6	Ami Reine Gake	2021–Present	1	–
6	Bertille Kounou	2021–Present	1	–
6	Takiyatou Yaya	2022–Present	1	–
6	Amiratou N'djambara	2019–Present	1	–

== Managers ==
Manager	Career	Games	Won	Drawn	Lost	Win %
(Togo) Paul Zoungbede	2006–2007	5	2	0	3	40.0
(Togo) **Kaï Tomety**	2018–present	3	0	0	3	0.0

== Achievements ==
=== Women's World Cup record ===
Women's World Cup finals									Women's World Cup qualification					
Year	Result	Position	Pld	W	D	L	GF	GA	Pld	W	D	L	GF	GA
(China) 1991	Did not enter								–	–	–	–	–	–
(Sweden) 1995	Did not enter								–	–	–	–	–	–
(United States) 1999	Did not enter								–	–	–	–	–	–
(United States) 2003	Did not enter								–	–	–	–	–	–
(China) 2007	Did not qualify								4	2	0	2	10	12
(Germany) 2011	Withdrew								–	–	–	–	–	–
(Canada) 2015	Did not enter								–	–	–	–	–	–
(France) 2019	Excluded								–	–	–	–	–	–
(Australia) (New Zealand) 2023	Did not qualify								Withdrawn					
(Brazil) 2027	To be determined								To be determined					
Total	–	–	–	–	–	–	–	–	4	2	0	2	10	12

=== Olympic Games record ===
Olympic Games finals									Olympic Games qualification					
Year	Result	Position	Pld	W	D	L	GF	GA	Pld	W	D	L	GF	GA
(United States) 1996	Ineligible								–	–	–	–	–	–
(Australia) 2000	Ineligible								–	–	–	–	–	–
(Greece) 2004	Did not enter								–	–	–	–	–	–
(China) 2008	Did not enter								–	–	–	–	–	–
(United Kingdom) 2012	Did not enter								–	–	–	–	–	–
(Brazil) 2016	Did not enter								–	–	–	–	–	–
(Japan) 2020	Did not enter								–	–	–	–	–	–
(France) 2024	Did not enter								–	–	–	–	–	–
Total	–	–	–	–	–	–	–	–	–	–	–	–	–	–

=== Africa Women Cup of Nations record ===
Africa Women Cup of Nations finals									Africa Women Cup of Nations qualification					
Year	Result	Position	Pld	W	D	L	GF	GA	Pld	W	D	L	GF	GA
1991	Did not enter								No Qualifying Process					
1995	Did not enter								No Qualifying Process					
(Nigeria) 1998	Did not enter								–	–	–	–	–	–
(South Africa) 2000	Did not enter								–	–	–	–	–	–
(Nigeria) 2002	Did not enter								–	–	–	–	–	–
(South Africa) 2004	Did not enter								–	–	–	–	–	–
(Nigeria) 2006	Did not qualify								4	2	0	2	10	12
(Equatorial Guinea) 2008	Did not enter								–	–	–	–	–	–
(South Africa) 2010	Withdrew								–	–	–	–	–	–
(Equatorial Guinea) 2012	Did not enter								–	–	–	–	–	–
(Namibia) 2014	Did not enter								–	–	–	–	–	–
(Cameroon) 2016	Withdrew								–	–	–	–	–	–
(Ghana) 2018	Excluded								–	–	–	–	–	–
2020	Cancelled								–	–	–	–	–	–
(Morocco) 2022	Group stage	11th	3	0	1	2	3	9						
(Morocco) 2024	Did not qualify													
Total	Group stage	11th	3	0	1	2	3	9	4	2	0	2	10	12

=== African Games record ===
African Games finals									African Games qualification					
Year	Result	Position	Pld	W	D	L	GF	GA	Pld	W	D	L	GF	GA
(Nigeria) 2003	Did not enter								No Qualifying Process					
(Algeria) 2007	Did not enter								–	–	–	–	–	–
(Mozambique) 2011	Did not enter								–	–	–	–	–	–
(Republic of the Congo) 2015	Did not enter								–	–	–	–	–	–
(Morocco) 2019	Did not enter								No Qualifying Process					
(Ghana) 2023	Did not enter								–	–	–	–	–	–
Total	–	–	–	–	–	–	–	–	–	–	–	–	–	–

=== Tournoi de Cinq Nations record ===
Tournoi de Cinq Nations
Year	Result	Position	Pld	W	D	L	GF	GA
(Burkina Faso) 2007	Disqualified	5th	1	0	0	1	0	5
Total	Group Stage	1/1	1	0	0	1	0	5

=== WAFU Women's Cup record ===
WAFU Zone B Women's Cup
Year	Result	Position	Pld	W	D	L	GF	GA
(Ivory Coast) 2018	Group stage	7th	3	0	0	3	1	17
(Ivory Coast) 2019	Group stage	7th	3	1	0	2	2	12
Total	Group Stage	1/1	3	0	0	3	1	17

== All−time record against FIFA recognized nations ==
Against	Played	Won	Drawn	Lost	GF	GA	GD
Congo	2	0	0	2	1	12	−11
Ivory Coast	1	0	0	1	0	5	−5
Mali	1	0	0	1	0	8	−8
Nigeria	1	0	0	1	1	3	−2
São Tomé and Príncipe	2	2	0	0	9	0	+9
Senegal	1	0	0	1	0	6	−6
Total	8	2	0	6	11	34	−23

== See also ==
- Sport in Togo
  - Football in Togo
    - Women's football in Togo
