= Amiratou N'djambara =

Togolese footballer (born 1999)

Personal information
- Date of birth: 10 April 1999 (age 27)
- Position: Attacking midfielder

Team information
- Current team: NBE

Senior career*
Years	Team	Apps	(Gls)
2019-2026	Future Stars Agoe	1	(1)
2020-2022	Raja Ain Harrouda	43	(31)
2022-2025	FUS	61	(38)
2025-2026	Nita	5	(3)
2026	NBE	10	(5)

International career
2020	Togo	12	(2)
- * Club domestic league appearances and goals

Amiratou N'djambara (born 10 April 1999) is a Togolese footballer who plays as a midfielder or striker for NBE.

== Early life ==
As a youth player, N'djambara joined the Futur Star d'Agoè academy.

== Career ==
N'djambara signed for Moroccan side Club Raja Aïn Harrouda, where she was described as "impose her stamp on the playing system of their new club, to the point of becoming essential throughout the meetings, in the system of Adil Faras, the club's coach. In 13 matches played, Amiratou N'djambara scored 13 goals". In 2022, she signed for Moroccan side Fath Union Sport, where she was described as "brilliant in the league since her arrival". She was nominated for the league Best Foreign Player award.

== Style of play ==
N'djambara operates as a striker or midfielder.

== Personal life ==
N'djambara was born in Lomé and has regarded France international Kadidiatou Diani as her football idol.
