= Odette Gnintegma =

Togolese footballer

Personal information
- Date of birth: 22 April 1999 (age 27)
- Position: Attacking midfielder

Team information
- Current team: FUS

Youth career
- FSA de Lomé

Senior career*
Years	Team	Apps	(Gls)
- Tempête
2017	Athlèta	9	(8)
2021–2022	Raja Ain Harrouda	20	(12)
2022	FUS	44	(21)

International career^{‡}
2022–	Togo	6	(5)
- * Club domestic league appearances and goals ‡ National team caps and goals as of 20 May 2025

Odette Gnintegma (born 22 April 1999) is a Togolese footballer who plays as an attacking midfielder for Moroccan club Raja Ain Harrouda and the Togo women's national team.

== Club career ==
Gnintegma has played for Tempête FC and Athlèta FC in Togo and for Raja Ain Harrouda in Morocco.

== International career ==
Gnintegma capped for the Togo women's national team at senior level during the 2022 Africa Women Cup of Nations qualification.
