= São Tomé and Príncipe women's national football team =

Women's national football team representing São Tomé and Príncipe

São Tomé and Príncipe
- Association: São Toméan Football Federation
- Confederation: CAF (Africa)
- Sub-confederation: UNIFFAC (Central Africa)
- FIFA code: STP

FIFA ranking
- Current: NR (16 June 2026)

First international
- São Tomé and Príncipe 0–2 Gabon (São Tomé, São Tomé and Príncipe; 9 August 2002)

Biggest defeat
- Central African Republic 9–0 São Tomé and Príncipe (Libreville, Gabon; 7 November 2026)

The São Tomé and Príncipe women's national football team represents São Tomé and Príncipe in international women's football. It is governed by the São Toméan Football Federation. It has played in six FIFA recognised matches and has never been internationally ranked by FIFA. The country also has a national under-19 team.

== History ==
São Tomé and Príncipe women's team played their first FIFA recognised fixture in 2002 when they participated in qualifications for the 2003 Women's World Cup. In the team's history, they have only played in six FIFA recognised matches. On 10 August 2002 in São Tome, São Tomé and Príncipe lost to Gabon 0–2 after being down 0–1 at the half. On 24 August 2002 in Libreville, São Tomé and Príncipe lost to Gabon 0–6 after being down 0–3 at the half. They finished last in the first group round, scoring 0 total goals and having 8 scored against them in two games. On 19 February 2006 in São Tomé and Príncipe, São Tomé and Príncipe lost 0–3 to Togo. On 26 February 2006 in Togo, São Tomé and Príncipe lost 0–6 to Togo. In 2010, the country did not have a team competing in the African Women's Championships during the preliminary rounds or at the 2011 All Africa Games. In June 2012, the team was not ranked in the world by FIFA. The team has never been ranked by FIFA.

In October 2021, São Tomé and Príncipe participated in the first round of 2022 Africa Women Cup of Nations qualification, which acted also as the first round of Africa's 2023 Women's World Cup qualifiers, but withdrew after losing the first leg to Togo 0–5, leading to the cancellation of the second and the team's elimination.

=== Under-20 ===
In 2002, São Tomé and Príncipe women's national under-19 football team participated in the African Women U-19 Championship, the first edition of the competition to be held. In the first round, they lost to Mali women's national under-19 football team twice with scores of 0–6 and 1–4. The age grouping for the youth national cup was subsequently changed from under-19 to under-20. São Tomé and Príncipe women's national under-20 football team was supposed to play against Central African Republic women's national under-20 football team in the African Women U-20 World Cup 2010 Qualifying in 2010 but São Tomé and Príncipe withdrew and Central African Republic got a walkover in their scheduled matches against the country.

== Background and development ==
The island country gained independence in 1975, the same year the national football association was created. The association gained FIFA recognition in 1986. Female players register with the national association starting at the age of 16. In 2009, there were only four women's only teams in the country, which formed a national competition.

Early development of the women's game at the time began when colonial powers brought football to the continent was limited as colonial powers in the region tended to take make concepts of patriarchy and women's participation in sport with them to local cultures that had similar concepts already embedded in them. The lack of later development of the national team on a wider international level symptomatic of all African teams is a result of several factors, including limited access to education, poverty amongst women in the wider society, and fundamental inequality present in the society that occasionally allows for female specific human rights abuses. When quality female football players are developed, they tend to leave for greater opportunities abroad. Continent wide, funding is also an issue, with most development money coming from FIFA, not the national football association. Future success for women's football in Africa is dependent on improved facilities and access by women to these facilities. Attempting to commercialise the game and make it commercially viable is not the solution, as demonstrated by the current existence of many youth and women's football camps held throughout the continent.

== Results and fixtures ==
The following is a list of match results in the last 12 months, as well as any future matches that have been scheduled.

Legend

Win Draw Lose Void or Postponed Fixture

=== 2026 ===
| 4 November 2026 Friendly | Congo | 4–1 | São Tomé and Príncipe | Libreville, Gabon |

| 7 November 2026 Friendly | Central African Republic | 9–0 | São Tomé and Príncipe | Libreville, Gabon |

== Coaching staff ==
=== Current coaching staff ===
As of September 2022

| Position | Name | Ref. |
|---|---|---|
| Head coach | (São Tomé and Príncipe) Marcelina da Costa | |

=== Manager history ===
- Lígia Santos (2022– )

== Players ==
=== Current squad ===
- The following players were named on 10 October 2021 for the 2022 Africa Women Cup of Nations qualification tournament.
- Caps and goals accurate up to and including 30 October 2021.

| No. | Pos. | Player | Date of birth (age) | Club |
|---|---|---|---|---|
| | GK | Euridice Bandeira | 8 November 2004 (age 22) | (São Toméan Football Federation) |
| | GK | Rosa Gomes | 3 September 2003 (age 23) | (São Toméan Football Federation) |
| | DF | Nielette Nazaré | 28 January 2000 (age 26) | (São Toméan Football Federation) |
| | DF | Jucelina Gonçalves | 28 June 2003 (age 23) | (São Toméan Football Federation) |
| | DF | Adgelsa de Sousa | 29 April 1998 (age 28) | (São Toméan Football Federation) |
| | DF | Maurícia Gomes | 28 November 2000 (age 25) | (São Toméan Football Federation) |
| | DF | Rita Managem | 8 February 1999 (age 27) | (São Toméan Football Federation) |
| | DF | Elcy Vicente Fernandes | 10 August 2009 (age 17) | (São Toméan Football Federation) |
| | DF | Inácia Santo | 28 June 2006 (age 20) | (São Toméan Football Federation) |
| | MF | Stela Rocha | 11 January 2000 (age 26) | (São Toméan Football Federation) |
| | MF | Vânia Duarte | 28 November 2003 (age 22) | (São Toméan Football Federation) |
| | MF | Reginalda da Veiga | 4 April 2004 (age 22) | (São Toméan Football Federation) |
| | MF | Geraldina Geraldina | 10 September 2001 (age 25) | (São Toméan Football Federation) |
| | FW | Wilma Guimarães | 25 April 2000 (age 26) | (São Toméan Football Federation) |
| | FW | Seliny Bragança | 8 November 2000 (age 26) | (São Toméan Football Federation) |
| | FW | Jecimila Ramos | 17 April 1999 (age 27) | (São Toméan Football Federation) |
| | FW | Mila Sacramento Simáo | 28 November 2002 (age 23) | (São Toméan Football Federation) |
| | FW | Mileyde Bonfim Gomes | 28 October 2002 (age 24) | (São Toméan Football Federation) |

=== Recent call-ups ===
The following players have been called up to a São Tomé and Príncipe squad in the past 12 months.

| Pos. | Player | Date of birth (age) | Caps | Goals | Club | Latest call-up |

–

== Competitive record ==
=== FIFA Women's World Cup ===
FIFA Women's World Cup record
| Year | Round | GP | W | D* | L | GS | GA | GD |
|---|---|---|---|---|---|---|---|---|
| (United States) 2003 | Did not qualify | | | | | | | |
| (China) 2007 | Did not qualify | | | | | | | |
| (Germany) 2011 to (France) 2019 | Did not enter | | | | | | | |
| (Australia) (New Zealand) 2023 | Did not qualify | | | | | | | |
| (Brazil) 2027 | To be determined | | | | | | | |
| Total | 0/4 | 0 | 0 | 0 | 0 | 0 | 0 | 0 |

*Draws include knockout matches decided on penalty kicks.

=== Olympic Games ===
Summer Olympics record
| Year | Result | Pld | W | D* | L | GS | GA | GD |
|---|---|---|---|---|---|---|---|---|
| (United States) 1996 | Did not qualify | | | | | | | |
| (Australia) 2000 | Did not qualify | | | | | | | |
| (Greece) 2004 | Did not qualify | | | | | | | |
| (China) 2008 | Did not qualify | | | | | | | |
| (United Kingdom) 2012 | Did not qualify | | | | | | | |
| (Brazil) 2016 | Did not qualify | | | | | | | |
| (Japan) 2020 | Did not qualify | | | | | | | |
| (France) 2024 | Did not enter | | | | | | | |
| Total | 0/8 | 0 | 0 | 0 | 0 | 0 | 0 | 0 |

*Draws include knockout matches decided on penalty kicks.

=== Africa Women Cup of Nations ===
Africa Women Cup of Nations
| Year | Round | GP | W | D* | L | GS | GA | GD |
|---|---|---|---|---|---|---|---|---|
| (Nigeria) 2002 | Did not qualify | | | | | | | |
| (South Africa) 2004 | Did not enter | | | | | | | |
| (Nigeria) 2006 | Did not qualify | | | | | | | |
| (Equatorial Guinea) 2008 to (Ghana) 2018 | Did not enter | | | | | | | |
| 2020 | Cancelled due to COVID-19 pandemic in Africa | | | | | | | |
| (Morocco) 2022 | Did not qualify | | | | | | | |
| (Morocco) 2024 | W/D | | | | | | | |
| Total | 0/3 | 0 | 0 | 0 | 0 | 0 | 0 | 0 |

*Draws include knockout matches decided on penalty kicks.

=== African Games record ===
African Games Finals
| Year | Round | GP | W | D | L | GS | GA |
|---|---|---|---|---|---|---|---|
| (Nigeria) 2003 | - | 0 | 0 | 0 | 0 | 0 | 0 |
| (Algeria) 2007 | - | 0 | 0 | 0 | 0 | 0 | 0 |
| (Mozambique) 2011 | - | 0 | 0 | 0 | 0 | 0 | 0 |
| (Republic of the Congo) 2015 | - | 0 | 0 | 0 | 0 | 0 | 0 |
| (Morocco) 2019 | - | 0 | 0 | 0 | 0 | 0 | 0 |
| (Ghana) 2023 | - | 0 | 0 | 0 | 0 | 0 | 0 |
| Total | 4/4 | 0 | 0 | 0 | 0 | 0 | 0 |

=== UNIFFAC Women's Cup ===
UNIFFAC Women's Cup
| Year | Result | Matches | Wins | Draws | Losses | GF | GA | GD |
|---|---|---|---|---|---|---|---|---|
| (Equatorial Guinea) 2020 | DID NOT ENTER | | | | | | | |
| Total | 1/1 | 4 | 0 | 3 | 1 | 4 | 5 | −1 |
