= Kégué Stadium =

Building in Togo

- Interactive map of Kégué Stadium
- Location: Avenue Jean-Paul 2, Lomé, Togo
- Coordinates: 6.2022°N 1.2397°E
- Capacity: 25,000
- Surface: Grass

Construction
- Opened: 12 January 2000

Tenant
- Togo national football team

Kégué Stadium is a multi-use stadium in Lomé, Togo. It is currently used mostly for football matches. The stadium holds 25,000 people and opened in 2000. It was designed by Chinese architect Yang Zhou. The stadium was the main host of the 2007 African U-17 Championship, in March 2007.

== History ==
In 2004, the stadium saw an incident following a match between Togo and Mali in the 2006 FIFA World Cup qualifiers. The lights on Stade de Kégué failed due to a power outage, and while the panicking crowd tried to leave the stadium, three people were killed and eight injured in the ensuing stampede. On 19 October 2007 the Confederation of African Football placed an indefinite ban on the stadium after an African Nations Cup qualifier between ended in violence which saw Malian players and fans injured. Over 118 million CFA francs were spent in renovations aiming for a higher security during the ban. Kégué went back to hosting international games in 2009, where Togo lost 2-1 to Morocco in the 2010 FIFA World Cup qualifiers.
