= 2021 COSAFA Women's Championship squads =

List of players competing at the 9th edition of the COSAFA Women's Championship

This article lists the squads for the 2021 COSAFA Women's Championship, the 9th edition of the COSAFA Women's Championship. The tournament is a women's international football tournament for national teams organised by COSAFA, teams from Southern Africa, and was held in Nelson Mandela Bay from 28 September to 9 October 2021. In the tournament were involved twelve national teams: nine teams from COSAFA and three teams from CECAFA, who were invited as guests. Each national team registered a squad of 20 players.

The age listed for each player is on 28 September 2021, the first day of the tournament. The numbers of caps and goals listed for each player do not include any matches played after the start of tournament. The club listed is the club for which the player last played a competitive match prior to the tournament. The nationality for each club reflects the national association (not the league) to which the club is affiliated. A flag is included for coaches that are of a different nationality than their own national team.

== Group A ==
=== Angola ===
Coach: Sousa Garcia

The squad was announced on 21 September 2021.

No.	Pos.	Player	Date of birth (age)	Club
1	GK	Mimi	2 March 1995 (aged 26)	(Angola) Paulo FC
3	DF	Nela	4 April 2002 (aged 19)	(Angola) Sagrada Esperança
4	MF	Lídia (captain)	29 January 1998 (aged 23)	(Angola) Sagrada Esperança
5	DF	Dorcacia		(Angola) Sagrada Esperança
6	MF	Prado	12 September 1999 (aged 22)	(Angola) 1º de Agosto
7	FW	Alegria	14 May 1995 (aged 26)	(Angola) Sagrada Esperança
8	MF	Chiquita	19 September 1997 (aged 24)	
10	FW	Ngonguinha	11 July 1999 (aged 22)	(Angola) Tchapesse CA
11	MF	Yara		(Angola) Sagrada Esperança
12	GK	Sandrinha	5 October 1997 (aged 23)	(Angola) Sagrada Esperança
13	DF	Fátima Faria		(Angola) GR Kilamba
14	FW	Bia	29 April 1997 (aged 24)	(Angola) GR Kilamba
15	DF	Erica Panguila		(Angola) GR Kilamba
16	MF	Eleúteria Pinto	6 September 1999 (aged 22)	(Angola) DC Exército
17	FW	Marizete	24 April 1999 (aged 22)	(Angola) Paulo FC
18	MF	Margarete	16 August 2002 (aged 19)	(Angola) 1º de Agosto
20	MF	Ladaínha	4 March 1992 (aged 29)	(Angola) Atlético do Cunene
21	MF	Ana Costa		(Angola) 1º de Agosto

=== Malawi ===
Coaches: McNerbert Kazuwa and Andrew Chikhosi

A preliminary squad was announced on 7 September 2021. The squad was reduced prior to the beginning of the tournament.

No.	Pos.	Player	Date of birth (age)	Club
1	GK	Mercy Sikelo	22 December 1997 (aged 23)	(Malawi) Ntopwa
2	DF	Emily Jossam	18 August 1998 (aged 23)	(Malawi) Blantyre Zero
3	DF	Ruth Nyirongo	30 December 1995 (aged 25)	(Malawi) DD Sunshine
4	DF	Chimwemwe Madise	6 April 1992 (aged 29)	(Zambia) Lusaka Dynamos
5	DF	Patricia Nyirenda	8 April 1998 (aged 23)	(Zambia) Lusaka Dynamos
6	MF	Lyna James		
7	FW	Asimenye Simwaka	8 August 1997 (aged 24)	(Malawi) Topik
8	MF	Chikondi Gondwe	19 September 1998 (aged 23)	(Malawi) CY Sisters
9	FW	Sabinah Thom	3 March 1996 (aged 25)	(Malawi) DD Sunshine
10	FW	Vanessa Chikupila	2 April 1991 (aged 29)	(Malawi) Blantyre Zero
11	FW	Fazila Chiyembekezo		(Malawi) Skippers
12	MF	Wezzie Mvula	6 July 1996 (aged 25)	(Malawi) DD Sunshine
13	GK	Ruth Mhango		(Malawi) Moyale Sisters
14	MF	Madyina Ngulube	18 June 1996 (aged 25)	(Malawi) DD Sunshine
15	DF	Mphatso Gondwe		(Malawi) DD Sunshine
16	GK	Samil Amidu	29 December 1996 (aged 24)	(Malawi) DD Sunshine
17	MF	Zainab Kapanda	12 March 2002 (aged 19)	(Malawi) Blantyre Zero
18	DF	Ireen Khumalo		(Malawi) Ascent Academy
19	MF	Carolyn Mathyola		(Malawi) DD Sunshine
20	DF	Tionge Phiri	28 August 2000 (aged 21)	(Malawi) DD Sunshine

=== Mozambique ===
Coach: Felizarda Lemos

The squad was announced on 17 September 2021.

No.	Pos.	Player	Date of birth (age)	Club
1	GK	Esperança		
2	DF	Lili		
3	DF	Virginia		
4	DF	Rosa António		
5	DF	Aurora		
6	FW	Fidelia		
7	MF	Chingueleze		
8	MF	Goia		
9	MF	Lónica		
10	FW	Ninika		
11	FW	Badru		
12	GK	Vava		
13	MF	Joana		
14	DF	Madona		
15	FW	Cina		
16	MF	Emília		
17	MF	Amélia		
18	DF	Cai'Cai (captain)		
19	MF	Marlene		
20	DF	Lúcia Leila		
21	MF	Deo		
22	GK	Isaura		

=== South Africa ===
Coach: Desiree Ellis

The squad was announced on 16 September 2021.

No.	Pos.	Player	Date of birth (age)	Club
1	GK	Kaylin Swart	30 September 1994 (aged 26)	(South Africa) JVW
2	DF	Karabo Makhurubetshi	3 February 1999 (aged 22)	(South Africa) Mamelodi Sundowns
3	FW	Mandisa Faya		
4	MF	Sibulele Holweni	28 April 2001 (aged 20)	(South Africa) University of the Western Cape
5	DF	Janine van Wyk (captain)	17 April 1987 (aged 34)	(Scotland) Glasgow City
6	MF	Mamello Makhabane	24 February 1988 (aged 33)	(South Africa) JVW
7	MF	Noxolo Cesane	11 October 2000 (aged 20)	(South Africa) University of the Western Cape
8	DF	Salome Kekana		
9	MF	Gabriela Salgado	20 February 1998 (aged 23)	(South Africa) JVW
10	MF	Oratile Mokwena	21 March 2001 (aged 20)	(South Africa) Mamelodi Sundowns
11	FW	Nokwanda Zondi		
12	MF	Robyn Moodaly	16 June 1994 (aged 27)	(South Africa) JVW
13	DF	Bambanani Mbane	12 March 1990 (aged 31)	(South Africa) Mamelodi Sundowns
14	DF	Tiisetso Makhubela	24 April 1997 (aged 24)	(South Africa) Tshwane University of Technology
15	FW	Kgaelebane Mohlakoana	10 December 1993 (aged 27)	(South Africa) Bloemfontein Celtic
16	GK	Asa Rabalao		
17	FW	Melinda Kgadiete	21 July 1992 (aged 29)	(South Africa) Mamelodi Sundowns
18	DF	Ongeziwe Ndlangisa	16 April 1994 (aged 27)	(South Africa) Sunflower
19	FW	Ntombifikile Ndlovu		(South Africa) Sunflower
20	FW	Chabana Reitumetse	5 August 1993 (aged 28)	(South Africa) Bloemfontein Celtic

== Group B ==
=== Botswana ===
Coach: Gaoletlhoo Nkutlwisang
On 27 September 2021, it was announced Nkutlwisang tested positive for COVID-19 and wouldn't travel with the team, who would be coached by Thaloba Nthaga, Belindah Moatswi, and Thabo Motang.

A preliminary squad was announced on 15 September 2021.

No.	Pos.	Player	Date of birth (age)	Club
1	GK	Gloria Moeng	3 February 1998 (aged 23)	Botswana Defence Force
2	DF	Kesegofetse Mochawe	30 January 1995 (aged 26)	(Botswana) Prisons
4	DF	Masego Montsho	15 June 1991 (aged 30)	Botswana Defence Force
5	DF	Theo George	30 January 2001 (aged 20)	(Botswana) Wonder Sporting
6	MF	Golebaone Selebatso	22 March 1991 (aged 30)	(Botswana) Prisons
7	FW	Refilwe Tholakele	26 January 1996 (aged 25)	(Botswana) Township Rollers
8	DF	Lone Gaofetoge	16 July 2001 (aged 20)	(Zambia) Lusaka Dynamos
9	DF	Mokgabo Thanda	3 April 1993 (aged 28)	(Zambia) Yasa
10	MF	Lesego Radiakanyo	27 June 1999 (aged 22)	(Botswana) Double Action
11	MF	Segakolodi Didukunyane	14 December 2000 (aged 20)	(Botswana) Mexican Girls
12	DF	Bonang Otlhagile	7 August 1986 (aged 35)	(Botswana) Double Action
13	MF	Amogelang Moahi	31 March 1990 (aged 31)	(Botswana) Geronah
14	DF	Veronicah Mogotsi	21 August 1992 (aged 29)	(Botswana) Double Action
15	DF	Balotlhanyi Johannes	28 June 1994 (aged 27)	(Botswana) Double Action
16	GK	Tlamelo Pheresi	30 November 1996 (aged 24)	(Botswana) Double Action
17	MF	Leano Busang	20 December 1999 (aged 21)	(Botswana) Prisons
18	DF	Nondi Mahlasela	25 December 1991 (aged 29)	(Botswana) Prisons
19	FW	Warona Molete	17 February 1998 (aged 23)	(Zambia) Lusaka Dynamos
20	MF	Gaonyadiwe Ontlametse	12 January 2000 (aged 21)	(Botswana) Double Action
23	GK	Marylin John	12 November 1996 (aged 24)	Botswana Defence Force

=== South Sudan ===
Coach: (South Africa) Shilene Booysen

No.	Pos.	Player	Date of birth (age)	Club
2	DF	Sumaya Noah		
3	DF	Amadrio Filder		
4	DF	Esther Kide		
5	DF	Dorka Lokeri		
6	MF	Suzzie Michael		
7	MF	Esther Luis		
8	MF	Mary Dan		
9	FW	Chiang Thomas		
10	MF	Amy Lasu (captain)	8 November 1995 (aged 25)	
11	MF	Sarah Modi		
12	MF	Namugeya Cosmas		
13	GK	Khalda Hasaan		
14	MF	Mary Kuach		
16	DF	Cicilia Juli		
17	MF	Kilega Lokonga		
18	FW	Ayikoru Luka		
19	FW	Josphine Makuei		
20	MF	Modong Simaya		
21	DF	Sarah Yesona		
23	GK	Anna Stephen		

=== Tanzania ===
Coach: Bakari Shime

The squad was announced on 20 September 2021.

No.	Pos.	Player	Date of birth (age)	Club
1	GK	Janeth Shija		
2	DF	Anastazia Antony	29 January 1996 (aged 25)	
3	MF	Eva Wailes	2 May 2000 (aged 21)	
4	MF	Amina Ally (sw) (captain)	23 May 2001 (aged 20)	(Tanzania) Yanga Princess
5	MF	Fatuma Issa		
6	FW	Donisia Minja		
7	FW	Mwanahamisi Shurua	16 October 1989 (aged 31)	(Tanzania) Simba Queens
8	MF	Stumai Abdallah	25 August 1997 (aged 24)	
9	DF	Mwamvua Haruna		
10	FW	Aisha Masaka	10 November 2003 (aged 17)	(Tanzania) Yanga Princess
11	FW	Diana Msewa		
12	MF	Janeth Pangamwene	27 November 2000 (aged 20)	
13	MF	Koku Kipanga		
14	DF	Clara Luvanga		
15	DF	Julietha Singano	8 February 2001 (aged 20)	(Tanzania) Simba Queens
16	MF	Zawadi Hamisi		
17	DF	Enekia Kasonga	20 April 2002 (aged 19)	
18	FW	Opah Clement	14 February 2001 (aged 20)	(Tanzania) Simba Queens
19	MF	Happiness Hensron	7 May 1996 (aged 25)	
20	GK	Zubeda Mgunda	20 October 1997 (aged 23)	(Tanzania) Simba Queens
21	GK	Husna Zuberi		

=== Zimbabwe ===
Coach: Sithetheliwe Sibanda

A preliminary squad was announced on 14 September 2021.

No.	Pos.	Player	Date of birth (age)	Club
1	GK	Cynthia Shonga	18 June 2000 (aged 21)	(Zimbabwe) Harare City
2	MF	Talent Mukwanda	24 April 1993 (aged 28)	(Zimbabwe) Herentals
3	DF	Edline Mutumbami	13 October 1996 (aged 24)	(Zimbabwe) Blue Swallows
4	DF	Egness Tumbare	31 July 1993 (aged 28)	(Zimbabwe) Harare City
5	MF	Emmaculate Msipa	7 June 1992 (aged 29)	Unattached
6	FW	Natasha Ndowa	3 January 1998 (aged 23)	(Zimbabwe) Blue Swallows
7	FW	Rudo Neshamba	10 February 1992 (aged 29)	(Zimbabwe) Harare City
8	DF	Sheila Makoto	14 January 1990 (aged 31)	(Zimbabwe) Blue Swallows
9	DF	Nobukhosi Ncube	17 February 1993 (aged 28)	(Zimbabwe) Correctional Services
10	MF	Mavis Chirandu	15 January 1995 (aged 26)	(Zimbabwe) Black Rhinos
12	MF	Marjory Nyaumwe	10 July 1987 (aged 34)	(Zimbabwe) Correctional Services
13	MF	Christobel Katona	13 February 1999 (aged 22)	(Zimbabwe) Black Rhinos
14	DF	Eunice Chibanda	26 March 1993 (aged 28)	(Zimbabwe) Black Rhinos
15	FW	Rutendo Makore	30 September 1992 (aged 28)	(Zimbabwe) Black Rhinos
16	GK	Lindiwe Magwede	1 December 1991 (aged 29)	(Zimbabwe) Herentals
17	FW	Priviledge Mupeti	29 September 1997 (aged 23)	(Zimbabwe) Black Rhinos
18	FW	Maudy Mafuruse	24 April 1999 (aged 22)	(Zimbabwe) Faith Drive
19	MF	Shyline Dambamuromo	4 April 2000 (aged 21)	(Zimbabwe) Faith Drive
22	GK	Precious Mudyiwa	2 February 1998 (aged 23)	(Zimbabwe) Black Rhinos

== Group C ==
=== Eswatini ===
Coach: Dumisani Makhanya

The squad was announced on 23 September 2021.

No.	Pos.	Player	Date of birth (age)	Club
1	GK	Gcinile Dlamini		(Eswatini) AS Interladies
2	MF	Tenanile Ngcamphalala	15 February 1998 (aged 23)	(Eswatini) Young Buffaloes
3	DF	Samkelisiwe Malinga		(Eswatini) AS Interladies
4	FW	Nomvula Sanga	15 September 1988 (aged 33)	(Eswatini) Manzini Wanderers
5	DF	Thulisile Dvuba	12 November 1988 (aged 32)	(Eswatini) Young Buffaloes
6	MF	Mazwi Dube		(Eswatini) Manzini Wanderers
7	FW	Celiwe Nkambule	19 February 1993 (aged 28)	(Eswatini) Young Buffaloes
8	DF	Noxolo Malinga		(Eswatini) Young Buffaloes
9	FW	Siphesihle Dlamini		(Eswatini) Royal Leopards
10	MF	Phumzile Dlamini		(Eswatini) Royal Leopards
11	FW	Nonjabuliso Mokgale		(Eswatini) Royal Leopards
12	DF	Thandeka Mbatha		(Eswatini) Manzini Wanderers
13	MF	Nokuthula Dlamini		(Eswatini) Young Buffaloes
14	MF	Thulisile Thring		
15	DF	Welile Ndwandwa		(Eswatini) Manzini Wanderers
16	GK	Sukoluhle Sibandze	12 December 1989 (aged 31)	(Eswatini) Young Buffaloes
17	DF	Futhie Dlamini		(Eswatini) Royal Leopards
18	MF	Simangele Sikhondze		(Eswatini) Elangeni Ladies
19	MF	Sikhanyiso Magagula		(Eswatini) Young Buffaloes
20	DF	Sibongile Ngwenya		Unattached

=== Namibia ===
Coach: Woody Jacobs

The squad was announced on 28 September 2021.

No.	Pos.	Player	Date of birth (age)	Club
1	GK	Sussana Eises		
2	DF	Selma Enkali		
3	DF	Iina Katuta	16 December 1986 (aged 34)	
4	DF	Kamunikire Tjituka		
5	DF	Emma Naris	8 November 1996 (aged 24)	
6	MF	Annouschka Kordom		
7	MF	Tuelikondjela Amukoto		
8	FW	Kylie van Wyk		
9	FW	Thomalina Adams	6 July 1993 (aged 28)	
10	MF	Milicent Hikuam		
11	FW	Anna-Marie Shikusho		
12	FW	Rita Williams	15 August 1979 (aged 42)	
13	DF	Veronica van Wyk		
14	DF	Nicole Philander		
15	DF	Lydiana Nanamus		
16	GK	Agnes Kauzuu	7 July 1979 (aged 42)	
17	MF	Memory Ngonda	11 February 1998 (aged 23)	
18	FW	Juliana Blou	7 May 1995 (aged 26)	
19	GK	Melissa Matheus		
20	DF	Lovisa Mulunga	18 March 1995 (aged 26)	(United States) Albany State Golden Rams
21	MF	Asteria Angula		
22	FW	Fiola Vliete		
23	FW	Beverly Ueziua		
24	FW	Gaironeeza Maclobo		
25	MF	Shanice Diaries		

=== Uganda ===
Coach: George Lutalo

A provisional squad was announced on 3 September 2021.

No.	Pos.	Player	Date of birth (age)	Club
1	GK	Ruth Aturo	19 July 1995 (aged 26)	(Uganda) UCU Lady Cardinals
3	DF	Asia Nakibuuka	28 December 2002 (aged 18)	(Uganda) Kawempe Muslim
4	DF	Bridget Nabisaalu	10 January 1997 (aged 24)	(Uganda) She Corporate
5	DF	Shadia Nankya	25 November 2001 (aged 19)	(Uganda) UCU Lady Cardinals
6	DF	Viola Namuddu	8 April 1994 (aged 27)	(Uganda) Makerere University
7	MF	Norah Alupo	15 December 2000 (aged 20)	(Uganda) Lady Doves
8	FW	Sandra Nabweteme	1 November 1996 (aged 24)	(Iceland) FH
9	FW	Otandeka Laki	24 January 1996 (aged 25)	(United States) New Jersey Copa
10	FW	Hasifah Nassuna	16 February 1998 (aged 23)	(Uganda) UCU Lady Cardinals
11	MF	Spencer Nakacwa	3 June 1999 (aged 22)	(Uganda) Lady Doves
12	MF	Joan Nabirye	25 June 1998 (aged 23)	(Uganda) She Maroons
13	DF	Phoebe Banura	21 June 1994 (aged 27)	(Uganda) UCU Lady Cardinals
14	DF	Eunice Ariokot		(Uganda) Olila High School
16	FW	Resty Nanziri	29 August 1997 (aged 24)	(Uganda) Kawempe Muslim
17	MF	Riticia Nabbosa	9 October 1997 (aged 23)	(Uganda) Lady Doves
19	GK	Daisy Nakaziro	22 September 1997 (aged 24)	(Uganda) Lady Doves
20	FW	Sharon Nadunga	7 December 2001 (aged 19)	(Uganda) Kawempe Muslim
21	MF	Amina Nababi	12 August 1998 (aged 23)	(Uganda) Makerere University
22	MF	Sheebah Zalwango	20 August 2000 (aged 21)	(Uganda) Asubo Gafford Ladies
23	MF	Phiona Nabbumba	20 July 2000 (aged 21)	(Uganda) She Corporate

=== Zambia ===
Coach: Bruce Mwape

The squad was announced on 16 September 2021.

No.	Pos.	Player	Date of birth (age)	Club
1	GK	Catherine Musonda	20 February 1998 (aged 23)	(Zambia) Indeni Roses
2	DF	Margret Mulenga		(Zambia) Lusaka Dynamos
3	DF	Lushomo Mweemba	10 April 2001 (aged 20)	(Zambia) Green Buffaloes
4	FW	Happy Pinto		(Zambia) ZESCO United
5	MF	Milika Limwanya	8 January 1996 (aged 25)	
6	MF	Elizabeth Mupeso		(Zambia) Lusaka Dynamos
7	FW	Ochumba Oseke	1 July 2002 (aged 19)	(Zambia) Red Arrows
8	DF	Margaret Belemu	24 February 1997 (aged 24)	(Zambia) Red Arrows
9	MF	Thandiwe Nkhata		Unattached
10	MF	Grace Chanda	11 June 1997 (aged 24)	(Zambia) Red Arrows
11	MF	Penelope Mulubwa		(Zambia) ZESCO United
12	DF	Esther Mukwasa	24 October 1996 (aged 24)	(Zambia) Indeni Roses
14	FW	Avell Chitundu	30 July 1997 (aged 24)	(Zambia) ZESCO United
15	MF	Agness Musase	11 July 1997 (aged 24)	(Zambia) Green Buffaloes
16	GK	Eunice Sakala		
17	MF	Mary Wilombe	22 September 1997 (aged 24)	(Zambia) Red Arrows
18	GK	Ngambo Musole	23 June 1998 (aged 23)	(Zambia) ZESCO United
19	DF	Vast Phiri	3 February 1996 (aged 25)	(Zambia) ZESCO United
20	DF	Patricia Lampi		(Zambia) YASA Girls
21	MF	Mary Mulenga	11 April 1998 (aged 23)	(Zambia) Red Arrows

== Player representation ==
Statistics are per the beginning of the competition.

=== By club ===
Clubs with 5 or more players represented are listed.
