= Technikum =

Technikum or Technicum may refer to:

- Technikum (Polish education)
- Tekhnikum, middle special education school in Soviet Union, Russia, and some other post-Soviet states
- Technicum (German education)
- Technikum (Dunaújváros), a district of Dunaújváros, Hungary

== See also ==
- Lexicon Technicum
- Lititz Watch Technicum
