= Namugerwa Gloria =

Ugandan footballer

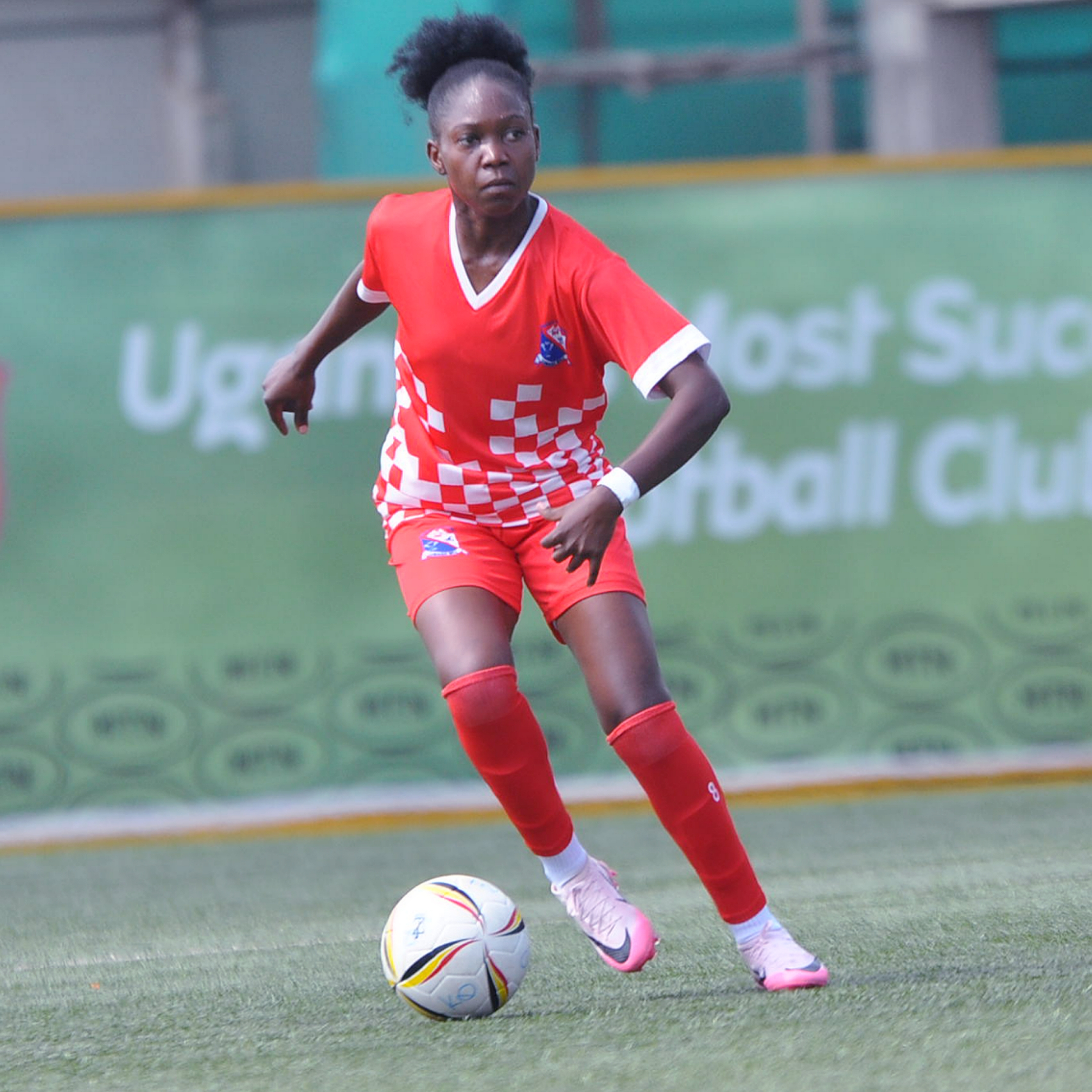
- With the ball in Women Super League

Personal information
- Full name: Namugerwa Gloria
- Date of birth: 29-November-2003
- Place of birth: Kabaale [Wakiso District]
- Position: Defender

Team information
- Current team: Uganda Martyrs Lubaga WFC
- Number: 8

Namugerwa Gloria (born 22 November 2003) is a Ugandan footballer who plays as a defender for the Uganda Martyrs Lubaga in the FUFA Women Super League.

== Educational background ==
Namugerwa Gloria began her elementary education at Kireka Grammar School, where she studied from 2007 to 2009, before transferring to Nkumba Model Primary School. She completed her Primary Leaving Examinations (PLE) there in 2013.

In 2014, she enrolled at Princess Diana Secondary School for her Ordinary Level (O-Level) education. However, after two years, she transferred to Uganda Martyrs High School in 2016, where she was offered a place due to her exceptional talent. She earned her Uganda Certificate of Education (UCE) in 2017 and later obtained her Uganda Advanced Certificate of Education (UACE) from the same school in 2019.

In 2020, Namugerwa joined Makerere University to pursue a degree in Arts with Education, although she did not complete the program, embarking on a professional football career. She signed with FCF Amani in Kinshasa.

== Career history ==
Namugerwa began her football journey in 2011 while she was in Primary Five, attributing her development to her coach, Allan Kabonge, who played a pivotal role in nurturing and honing her talent. In 2014, she also joined the Princess Diana Secondary School on a football scholarship.

She later became a member of Uganda Martyrs Women's Football Club (WFC), where she played as the team progressed from the Regional League to the Elite League and eventually to the Super League. Namugerwa also represented the national team at the Under-17 level.

== Club career ==
Gloria has also played locally for the following clubs.

YEAR	CLUB LEVEL
2019-2020	Uganda Martyrs Lubaga WFC
2020-2021	Lady Doves FC
2023-to-date	Uganda Martyrs Lubaga WFC

== International career ==
Gloria joined FCF Amani FC in DR Congo Women top flight side upon signing a two-year employment contract.
