= Myra Manganye =

- Born: Myra Rhulani Manganye; 10 November 1986 (age 39); Pretoria, South Africa
- Education: Tshwane University of Technology
- Occupations: BB Cosmetics Brands Ambassador, Author, National African Groom Entrepreneurs Ambassador, Model and Philanthropist
- Title: South Africa’s Ultimate Brand Ambassador 2013
- Awards: (SA’s Ultimate Brand Ambassador) 2013 (Winner) (Miss Mamelodi 1st princess) (Tshwane University of Technology 1st team 2010 Tennis Gold Medalist)

Myra Manganye (born 10 November 1986) is a South African Reality Competition titleholder who was crowned South Africa's Ultimate Brand Ambassador 2013, becoming the official national ambassador of her country to interlink the social and corporate sectors, while benefiting local African communities and countries, and recruiting philanthropists and supporting SME's.

== Early life ==
Manganye was born and raised in Pretoria. She was born in 1986 and has two sisters and one brother. She is a philanthropist and a graduate in Information Technology from Tshwane University of Technology.

== Career ==
Manganye was crowned South Africa's Ultimate Brand Ambassador, at an event held at Montecasino North of Johannesburg on 4 August 2014.

Manganye has co–written a book with the other top 5 runner ups from SAUBA competition about being a national ambassador and her mission for the country.
