= Római tábor =

Római tábor is a district of Dunaújváros, Hungary. Plans made for example by Dénes Kiss urbanist learnt in England about the construction date from 1962. It was built in two strokes. First part included territory at Római városrész, near Dunapart. There are several artworks here. These are colourful, these are the main parts of the facades. There are several 10-storey buildings here.

IPhase II. of the construction includes territories further from River Danube. These parts are out of Római körút. Roads Batsányi and Váci Mihály are here. There are sights to Bagolyvár, Technikum, and Óváros.

== Sources ==
- Dunaújvárosi Köztéri Szobrai, Várnai Gyula - Gyöngyössy Csaba, 1999, Ma Kiadó, ISBN 963 85423 7 3
- Dunapentele Sztálinváros, Dunaújváros Numizmatikai Emlékei 1950–2010, Asztalos Andrásné, ISBN 978-963-08-1300-6
