= Saint Petersburg Medical Technikum No. 2 =

Russian nursing and massage school

Coordinates: 59°53′22″N 30°21′21″E

Saint Petersburg Medical Technikum № 2
- Type: Technikum
- Established: 1870
- Location: Saint Petersburg, Russia
- Website: www.georgtech.ru

Saint Petersburg Medical Technikum № 2 — is a vocational education technikum in Saint Petersburg, Russia. It's one of the oldest Russian educational institutions for training medical staff. Currently it has 2 directions of study - "Nursing" and "Medical Massage (training of visually impaired persons)".

== History ==
Immediately after Community for Care of Wounded and Sick's foundation in 1867 (since 1879 – Russian Red Cross Society), need for Sisters of Mercy training was understood. On November 26, 1870, Saint George Sisters of Mercy Community was founded.

In October 1874, feldsher school was opened in the Community. Later, hospital was created, equipped with best medical facilities (for that time). The hospital was located near the Krasnoye Selo. Year after year, hospital grew from 10 to more than 200 beds.

Since the first years of Community, its sisters served in various civil and military medical facilities of Petersburg. For example, famous Russian surgeon Nikolai Korotkov was appointed as the senior physician of sanitary squad and went to Russo-Japanese War. Number of doctors worked for free in hospital, even famous ones, like Sergey Botkin.

Community continued its work even in 1918. In January 1919, a lot of students from other schools were transferred there in order to continue nursing education. Later, Community school was reorganized into Karl Marx Hospital Sisters of Mercy Normal School. During following decades, school was reorganized few times as well, until it became Saint Petersburg Medical Technikum № 2. Current technikum's building was created during 1936–37, in socialist classicism style.

== Former names ==
Saint George Sisters of Mercy Community (1870–1920), Karl Marx Hospital Sisters of Mercy Normal School (1920–1923), Karl Marx Nursing Courses (1923–1926), Karl Marx Medical Technikum (1926–1933), Karl Marx 2nd Medical Technikum (1933–1935), Karl Marx 2nd Feldsher-Midwife Medical Technikum (1935–1936), Karl Marx 2nd Feldsher-Midwife School (1936–1949), 2nd Feldsher School (1949–1954), 2nd Leningrad Medical Vocational School (1954–1995), Saint Petersburg Medical Vocational School № 2 (1995–2010)

== Famous graduates ==
Fedor Trikolich(class of 2006) - is a visually impaired Russian sprinter. He won two gold and a silver medal at the 2012 Summer Paralympics. He is also a multiple world and European champion, taking nine medals over five tournaments.
