= Vocational technical school =

Vocational technical school may refer to:

- Vocational-technical school, principally North American
- Professional technical school, principally Eastern European and Eurasian

== See also ==
- Vocational school
- Technical school
