= 2021 CAF Women's Champions League COSAFA Qualifiers =

Inaugural COSAFA Women's Champions League edition

COSAFA Women's Champions League

Tournament details
- Host country: South Africa
- City: 1
- Dates: 26 August – 4 September
- Teams: 7 (from 14 associations)
- Venues: 2 (in 1 host city)

Final positions
- Champions: (South Africa) Mamelodi Sundowns (1st title)
- Runners-up: (Zimbabwe) Black Rhinos Queens

Tournament statistics
- Matches played: 12
- Goals scored: 42 (3.5 per match)
- Top scorer: (South Africa) Melinda Kgadiete (Mamelodi Sundowns) (5 goals)
- Best player: (Zimbabwe) Rutendo Makore (Black Rhino Queens)
- Best goalkeeper: (Zimbabwe) Precious Mudyiwa (Black Rhino Queens)

The 2021 CAF Women's Champions League COSAFA Qualifiers, commonly known as the 2021 COSAFA Women's Champions League, was the inaugural edition of the annual qualification competition for the CAF Women's Champions League organized by COSAFA for its nations. This edition was held in two stadiums in Durban, South Africa from 26 August to 4 September 2021.

== Teams ==
The following teams participated in this edition of the competition. CD Costa do Sol from Mozambique had its license rejected by CAF for failing to meet the competition's criteria.

- (Botswana) Double Action Ladies
- (Eswatini) Manzini Wanderers Ladies
- Lesotho Defence Force Ladies
- (Namibia) Tura Magic Ladies FC
- (South Africa) Mamelodi Sundowns Ladies
- (Zambia) Green Buffaloes Women
- (Zimbabwe) Black Rhinos Queens

== Venue ==
This edition of the tournament was held at the King Zwelithini Stadium and Moses Mabhida Stadium in Durban, South Africa.

Durban	Durban is located in South Africa
King Zwelithini Stadium	Durban is located in South Africa
Capacity: 10,000	Durban is located in South Africa
Moses Mabhida Stadium	Durban is located in South Africa
Capacity: 55,500	Durban is located in South Africa

== Match officials ==
Referees

- (Eswatini) Letticia Viana
- (Namibia) Antsino Twanyanyukwa
- (Botswana) Itumeleng Methikga
- (Lesotho) Nteboheleng Setoko
- (Zambia) Patience Mumba

Assistant Referees

- (Botswana) Botsalo Mosimanewatlala
- (Zambia) Mercy Zulu
- (South Africa) Nobuhle Tsokela
- (Lesotho) Polotso Maapara
- (Malawi) Eliza Sichinga
- (Eswatini) Siphiwayikhosi Cosma Nxumalo

== Draw ==
The draw ceremony of the edition of the competition was held on 29 July 2021 11:00 CAT/SAST (09:00 UTC) in Johannesburg, South Africa.

== Group summary ==
Group A	Group B
(South Africa) Mamelodi Sundowns; Lesotho Defence Force Ladies; (Botswana) Double Action Ladies; (Eswatini) Manzi Wanderers Ladies	(Zambia) Green Buffaloes; (Namibia) Tura Magic Ladies FC; (Zimbabwe) Black Rhinos Queens

== Group stage ==
Key to colours in group tables
Group winners and runners-up advance to the Knockout stage

Tiebreakers

Teams are ranked according to the three points for a win system (3 for a win, 1 for a draw and none/0 for a loss) and if tied on points, the following tie-breaking criteria are applied, in the order given, to determine the rankings.

1. Points in head-to-head matches among tied teams;
2. Goal difference in head-to-head matches among tied teams;
3. Goals scored in head-to-head matches among tied teams;
4. If more than two teams are tied, and after applying all head-to-head criteria above, a subset of teams are still tied, all head-to-head criteria above are reapplied exclusively to this subset of teams;
5. Goal difference in all group matches;
6. Goals scored in all group matches;
7. Penalty shoot-out if only two teams are tied and they met in the last round of the group;
8. Disciplinary points (yellow card = 1 point, red card as a result of two yellow cards = 3 points, direct red card = 3 points, yellow card followed by direct red card = 4 points);
9. Drawing of lots.

All times are in South African Standard Time (UTC+02:00).

=== Group A ===
Pos	Team	Pld	W	D	L	GF	GA	GD	Pts	Status
1	(South Africa) Mamelodi Sundowns (H)	3	3	0	0	18	1	+17	9	Qualified for the Knockout phase
2	(Botswana) Double Action Ladies	3	2	0	1	9	6	+3	6	Qualified for the Knockout phase
3	(Eswatini) Manzini Wonderers	3	0	1	2	2	10	−8	1	
4	Lesotho Defence Force Ladies	3	0	1	2	1	13	−12	1	

Source: Goalzz
(H) Hosts
26 August 2021
12:00

Double Action Ladies (Botswana)	3–0	(Eswatini) Manzini Wanderers
Moloi 27'; Radiakanyo 55'; G. Ontlametse 78'	Report

King Zwelithini Stadium, Durban
Referee: Antsino Twanyanyukwa (Namibia)
26 August 2021
15:00

Mamelodi Sundowns (South Africa)	6–0	Lesotho Defence Force Ladies
Mgcoyi 15', 66', 69'; R. Mulaudz 20'; Kgadiete 60'; Rabale 90'	Report

King Zwelithini Stadium, Durban
Referee: Letticia Viana (Eswatini)

28 August 2021
12:00

Lesotho Defence Force Ladies	1–1	(Eswatini) Manzini Wanderers
K. Lebakeng 3'	Report	N. Sanga 89'

King Zwelithini Stadium, Durban
Referee: Patience Mumba (Zambia)
28 August 2021
15:00

Mamelodi Sundowns (South Africa)	6–0	(Botswana) Double Action Ladies
Nhlapo 13'; Kgadiete 25', 46', 63'; Mgcoyi 50'; Daweti 74'	Report

King Zwelithini Stadium, Durban
Referee: Antsino Twanyanyukwa (Namibia)

30 August 2021
12:00

Lesotho Defence Force Ladies	0–6	(Botswana) Double Action Ladies
	Report	G. Ontlametse 3'; Radiakanyo 14', 75'; B. Otlhagile 27'; L. Kgalaeng 40'; L. Pineng 90'

King Zwelithini Stadium, Durban
Referee: Letticia Viana (Eswatini)
30 August 2021
15:00

Mamelodi Sundowns (South Africa)	6–1	(Eswatini) Manzini Wanderers
C. Esau 10', 27'; Daweti 35', 56'; T. Masibi 52'; K. Mali 72'	Report	N. Sanga 67'

King Zwelithini Stadium, Durban
Referee: Itumeleng Methikga (Botswana)

=== Group B ===
Pos	Team	Pld	W	D	L	GF	GA	GD	Pts	Status
1	(Zimbabwe) Black Rhinos Queens	2	2	0	0	5	0	+5	6	Qualified for the Knockout stage
2	(Zambia) Green Buffaloes	2	1	0	1	1	2	−1	3	Qualified for the Knockout stage
3	(Namibia) Tura Magic Ladies FC	2	0	0	2	0	4	−4	0	

Source: Goalzz

27 August 2021
14:00

Green Buffaloes (Zambia)	0–2	(Zimbabwe) Black Rhinos Queens
	Report	Nyaumwe 60'; C. Katona 73'

King Zwelithini Stadium, Durban
Referee: Itumeleng Methikga (Botswana)

29 August 2021
14:00

Tura Magic Ladies FC (Namibia)	0–3	(Zimbabwe) Black Rhinos Queens
	Report	Makore 23', 68'; C. Katona 66'

Moses Mabhida Stadium, Durban
Referee: Nteboheleng Setoko (Lesotho)

31 August 2021
14:00

Green Buffaloes (Zambia)	1–0	(Namibia) Tura Magic Ladies FC
Mulenga 88'	Report

Moses Mabhida Stadium, Durban
Referee: Nteboheleng Setoko (Lesotho)

== Knockout stage ==
At the knockout stage, extra-time and penalty shoot-out may be used if necessary for tie-breakers if scores level after normal regulation time.

=== Bracket ===
Semi-finals
2 September – Durban
(Zimbabwe) Black Rhinos Queens	2
(Botswana) Double Action Ladies	0
2 September – Durban
(South Africa) Mamelodi Sundowns	1
(Zambia) Green Buffaloes	0

Final
4 September – Durban
(Zimbabwe) Black Rhinos Queens	0
(South Africa) Mamelodi Sundowns	3

=== Semi-finals ===
2 September 2021
12:00

Black Rhinos Queens (Zimbabwe)	2–0	(Botswana) Double Action Ladies
Chirandu 4'; Nyaumwe 15'	Report

Moses Mabhida Stadium, Durban
Referee: Antsino Twanyanyukwa (Namibia)
2 September 2021
15:00

Mamelodi Sundowns (South Africa)	1–0	(Zambia) Green Buffaloes
Kgadiete 44'	Report

King Zwelithini Stadium, Durban
Referee: Itumeleng Methikga (Botswana)

=== Final ===
4 September 2021
15:00

Black Rhinos Queens (Zimbabwe)	0–3	(South Africa) Mamelodi Sundowns
	Report	L. Kgasago 12'; N. Mthandi 78'; Rabale 90'

King Zwelithini Stadium, Durban
Referee: Letticia Viana (Eswatini)

== Statistics ==
=== Goalscorers ===
There were 42 goals scored in 12 matches, for an average of 3.5 goals per match.

Rank	Player	Team	Goals
1	(South Africa) Melinda Kgadiete	(South Africa) Mamelodi Sundowns	5
2	(South Africa) Andisiwe Mgcoyi	(South Africa) Mamelodi Sundowns	4
3	(South Africa) Lelona Daweti	(South Africa) Mamelodi Sundowns	3
3	(Botswana) Lesego Radiakanyo	(Botswana) Double Action Ladies	3
5	(Zimbabwe) Rutendo Makore	(Zimbabwe) Black Rhinos Queens	2
5	(Zimbabwe) Cristobel Katona	(Zimbabwe) Black Rhinos Queens	2
5	(Zimbabwe) Marjory Nyaumwe	(Zimbabwe) Black Rhinos Queens	2
5	(Lesotho) Boitumelo Rabale	(South Africa) Mamelodi Sundowns	2
5	(South Africa) Chantelle Esau	(South Africa) Mamelodi Sundowns	2
5	(Botswana) Gaonyadiwe Ontlametse	(Botswana) Double Action Ladies	2
5	(Eswatini) Nomvula Sanga	(Eswatini) Manzini Wonderers	2
11	(South Africa) Rhoda Mulaudzi	(South Africa) Mamelodi Sundowns	1
11	(South Africa) Zanele Nhlapho	(South Africa) Mamelodi Sundowns	1
11	(South Africa) Lerato Kgasago	(South Africa) Mamelodi Sundowns	1
11	(South Africa) Nonhlanhla Mthandi	(South Africa) Mamelodi Sundowns	1
11	(South Africa) Thembelihle Masibi	(South Africa) Mamelodi Sundowns	1
11	(South Africa) Khunjulwa Mali	(South Africa) Mamelodi Sundowns	1
11	(Botswana) Laone Moloi	(Botswana) Double Action Ladies	1
11	(Botswana) Lone Kgalaeng	(Botswana) Double Action Ladies	1
11	(Botswana) Lesego Pineng	(Botswana) Double Action Ladies	1
11	(Lesotho) Kholu Lebakeng	Lesotho Defence Force Ladies	1
11	(Zambia) Anita Mulenga	(Zambia) Green Buffaloes	1
11	(Zimbabwe) Mavis Chirandu	(Zimbabwe) Black Rhinos Queens	1
