= Precious Mudyiwa =

Zimbabwean footballer (born 1998)

Personal information
- Date of birth: 2 February 1998 (age 28)
- Position: Goalkeeper

Team information
- Current team: Black Rhinos

Senior career*
Years	Team	Apps	(Gls)
- Black Rhinos

International career^{‡}
2021–	Zimbabwe	1+	(0+)
Medal record
COSAFA Women's Champions League
Silver medal – second place	2021 South Africa
- * Club domestic league appearances and goals ‡ National team caps and goals as of 4 October 2021.

Precious Mudyiwa (born 2 February 1998) is a Zimbabwean footballer who plays as a goalkeeper for Black Rhinos Queens FC and the Zimbabwe women's national team.

== Club career ==
Mudyiwa played for Zimbabwean club Black Rhinos Queens at the 2021 CAF Women's Champions League COSAFA Qualifiers where she was named goal keeper of the tournament despite being a runner-up.

== International career ==
Mudyiwa capped for Zimbabwe at senior level during the 2021 COSAFA Women's Championship.

== Honours ==
Club

Black Rhino Queens

- COSAFA Women's Champions League: runner-up: 2021

Individual

- 2021 COSAFA Women's Champions League: Best goal keeper
