= Tekhnikum =

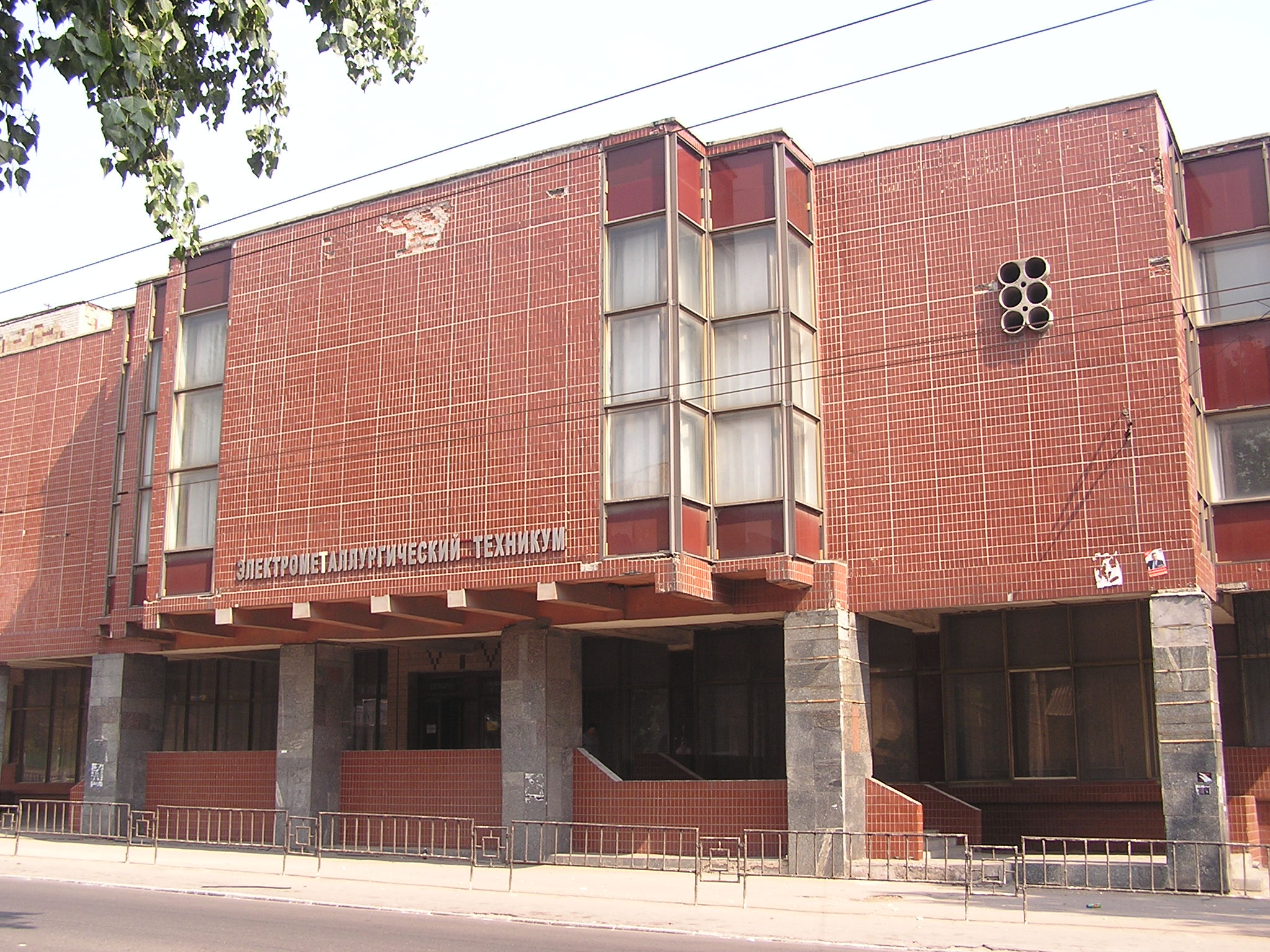
A Technikum in Donetsk

A tekhnikum (Russian: техникум) is a type of secondary vocational school in the Russian Empire, the Soviet Union, as well as in modern Russia, Ukraine and some other post-Soviet states. The tekhnikums were (and are) to prepare educated workforce for various branches of industry, agriculture, construction, transport, and communications. The education level was intermediate, between ordinary school and higher education (universities, institutes). There were also tekhnikums for other occupations in the economy of the Soviet Union: artisans, tailors, salesmen, cooks, bookkeepers, etc.

The term was borrowed from 19th-century German education, where these kinds of school were called Technicum. In modern Russia many tekhnikums were renamed into "technical college", "technological college", "technical liceum", etc.

== See also ==
- Professional technical school
- Technikum (Polish education)
- Technicum (German education)
- Technikon, South Africa
