= Daisy Nakaziro =

Ugandan footballer (born 1997)

Personal information
- Date of birth: 22 September 1997 (age 29)
- Position: Goalkeeper

Team information
- Current team: Kampala Queens FC

Senior career*
Years	Team	Apps	(Gls)
- Lady Doves
- Uganda Martyrs WFC

International career^{‡}
2021–	Uganda	1	(0)
- * Club domestic league appearances and goals ‡ National team caps and goals as of 26 October 2021.

Daisy Nakaziro (born 22 September 1997) is a Ugandan footballer who plays as a goalkeeper for FUFA Women Super League club Kampala Queens FC and the Uganda women's national team The Crested Cranes.

== Club career ==
Nakaziro has played for Lady Doves in Uganda. and won with them the inaugural Women Super League in 2021. Nakaziro also featured for Uganda Martyrs Lubaga WFC before joining Kampala Queens FC in 2022.

== International career ==
Nakaziro capped for Uganda at senior level during the 2021 COSAFA Women's Championship.
