= Technikon =

South African post-secondary institution

A technikon was a post-secondary institute of technology (polytech) in South Africa. It focused on career-oriented vocational training. There were 15 technikons in the 1990s, but they were merged or restructured as universities (especially universities of technology) in the early 2000s.

== Etymology ==
The word comes from the Greek technikon, meaning 'technical'. (cf. Some technical schools were called technikums elsewhere in the world.)

== List of technikons ==
The right arrow → indicates the year it became a technikon, if started out as another type of school.

Institute	Existence	Now
Border Technikon ← Ciskei Technikon, 1980s	1987–2005	Walter Sisulu University
Cape Technikon; Afrikaans: Kaapse Technikon	1920–2005 → technikon, 1979	Cape Peninsula University of Technology
Eastern Cape Technikon ← Transkei Technikon	1991–2005	Walter Sisulu University
Peninsula Technikon	1962-2005 → technikon, 1979	Cape Peninsula University of Technology
Port Elizabeth Technikon (PE Technikon)	1882–2005 → technikon, 1979	Nelson Mandela Metropolitan University
Technikon Pretoria	1968–2004 → technikon, 1979	Tshwane University of Technology
Technikon Natal	1907–2002 → technikon, 1979	Durban Institute of Technology
Technikon North-West ← Setlogelo Technikon, 1994–97	1976–2004 → technikon, 1994	Tshwane University of Technology
Technikon Northern Gauteng ← Technikon Northern Transvaal, –1997	1980–2004	Tshwane University of Technology
Technikon SA (Technikon South Africa) ← Technikon RSA, 1980–93	1980–2004	University of South Africa
Technikon Free State; Technikon Vrystaat, 1994-2004 ← Technikon OFS / OVS, 1988-1994	1988?–2004	Central University of Technology
ML Sultan Technikon	1946–2002 → technikon, 1979	Durban Institute of Technology
Mangosuthu Technikon	1979–2001	Mangosuthu University of Technology
Vaal Triangle Technikon; Vaaldriehoekse Technikon	1966–2003 → technikon, 1979	Vaal University of Technology
Witwatersrand Technikon	1923–2005 → technikon, 1979	University of Johannesburg

In some sources, certain school names were reversed, e.g., Technikon Pretoria or Pretoria Technikon. Likewise, Witwatersrand Technikon or Technikon Witwatersrand; Natal Technikon or Technikon Natal; Free State Technikon or Technikon Free State.

== History ==
Some technical colleges were founded in the early to mid-20th century in the country. In 1967, four technical colleges (Cape, Pretoria, Witwatersrand and Natal) became "colleges of advanced technical education". Two more such colleges (Vaal and Witwatersrand) were added by 1969. These six colleges became the first technikons in 1979.

In the 1980s and 1990s, 9 more technikons were constituted, bringing up the total to 15.

Compared to universities, technikons were not seen as prestigious. The Committee of Technikon Principals felt that "the name technikon had become a stumbling block", as their graduates were not recognized by professional associations, especially internationally.

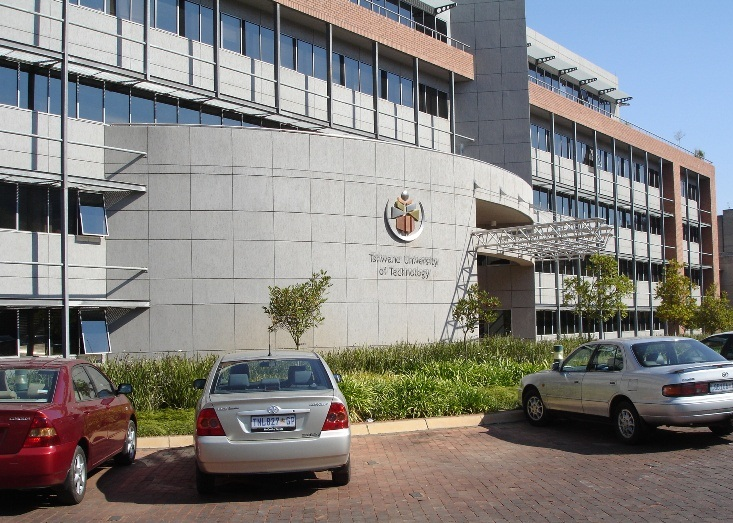
Tshwane University of Technology combined 3 technikons.

Mergers and reorganisations were announced in 2002, drastically reducing the number of technikons. By 2006, after a process to transform the nation's "higher education landscape", there were no technikons left.

== Student compositions ==
During Apartheid, the schools were divided into historically white technikons (HWTs) and historically black technikons (HBTs). The seven white technikons include the 'big four' (Cape, Pretoria, Witwatersrand and Natal), which had the most students (6000–11000 in 1991). The other white technikons were Free State, Port Elizabeth, and Vaal Triangle. SA was for distance learning, with a slight majority of whites.

Northern Gauteng and Mangosuthu were black technikons. Peninsula was classified as a HBT, but it was mostly attended by Coloureds. ML Sultan was also nominally a HBT, but was mostly attended by Indians.

Three technikons were created in bantustans; these had the lowest enrollments: Border (Ciskei), Eastern Cape (Transkei), and North-West (initially named Setlogelo; in Bophuthatswana).

== Degrees ==
In 1993, the Technikon Act (No. 125) enabled technikons to provide degree studies and confer degrees. Several technikon programmes were possible:

- national higher certificate (2 years)
- national diploma (3 years): 75% of technikon enrollments were in this diploma.
  - 2 years of theoretical training, plus
  - 1 year of experiential training with an industrial employer
- national higher diploma (4 years)
- bachelor's degree in technology (B-Tech: 4 years)
- in some schools: master's degree (M-Tech: 1 year minimum)
- in some schools: doctoral degree (D-Tech: 2 years minimum).

White technikons and ML Sultan Technikon offered degrees at all three levels (bachelor's, master's and doctorates), but others did not.
