= Technikon Witwatersrand =

Technical college in South Africa

- Type: Technikon
- Location: South Africa

The Technikon Witwatersrand was a technikon located in South Africa. On 1 January 2005, it merged with Rand Afrikaans University and the Soweto and East Rand campuses of Vista University to form the University of Johannesburg. The former Vista University East Rand Campus has subsequently been permanently closed.
