= Technicum (German education) =

In 19th century German education, Technicum was a lower grade of vocational schools (lower than the polytechnical institute), with training of 2.5–4 years.

This term was borrowed in Poland (Technikum) and in Russia (Tekhnikum).
