= Tshwane University of Technology Soshanguve Campus =

South African multi-campus university

Tshwane University of Technology - Soshanguve Campus
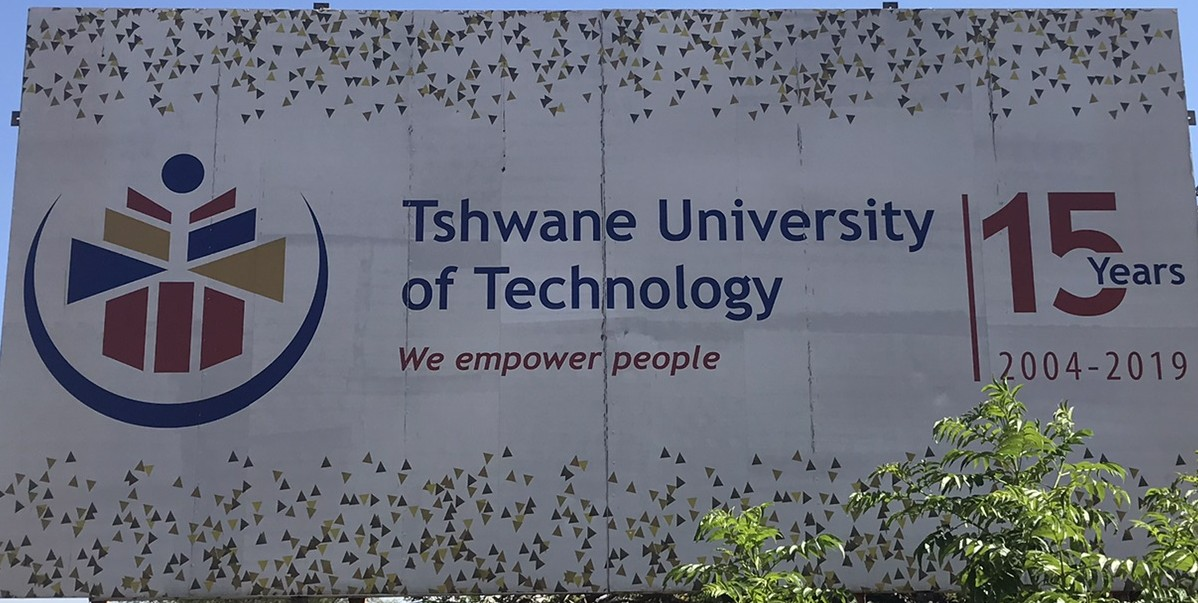
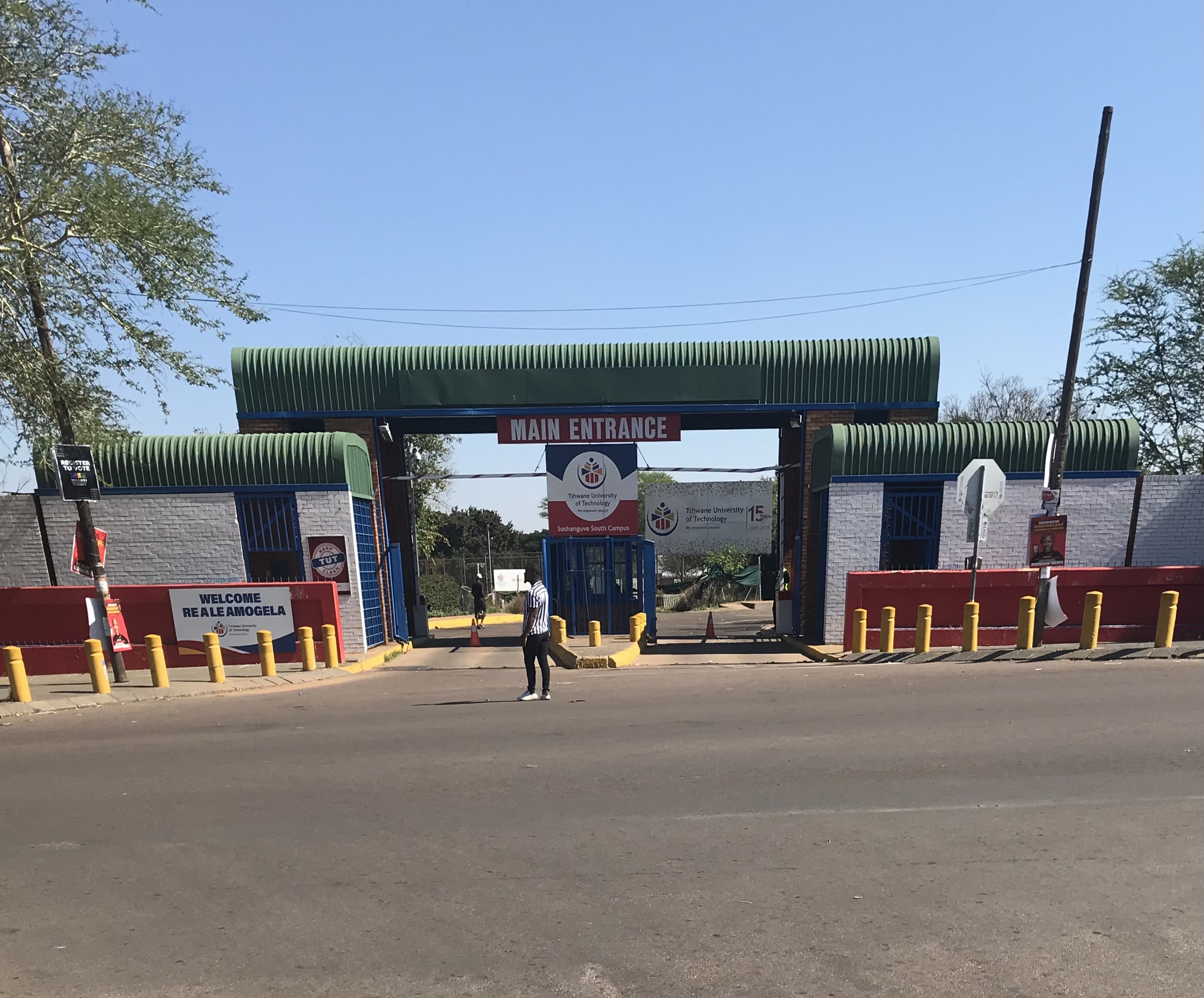
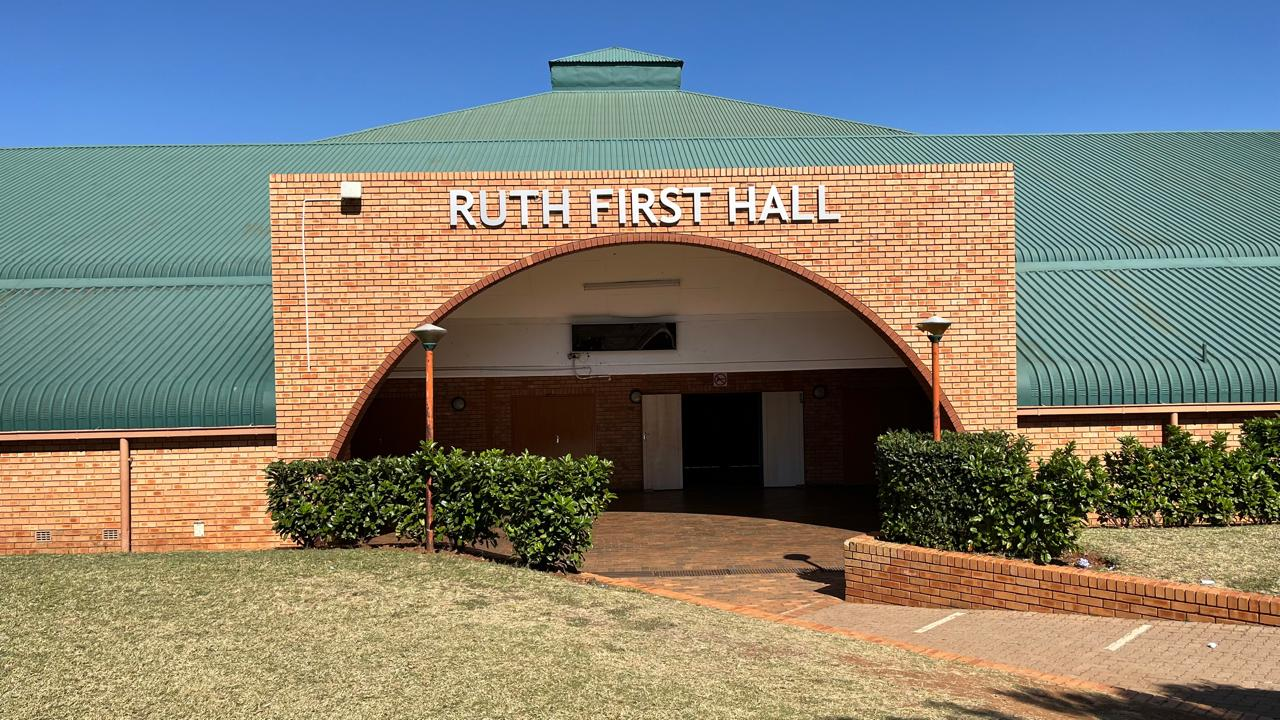
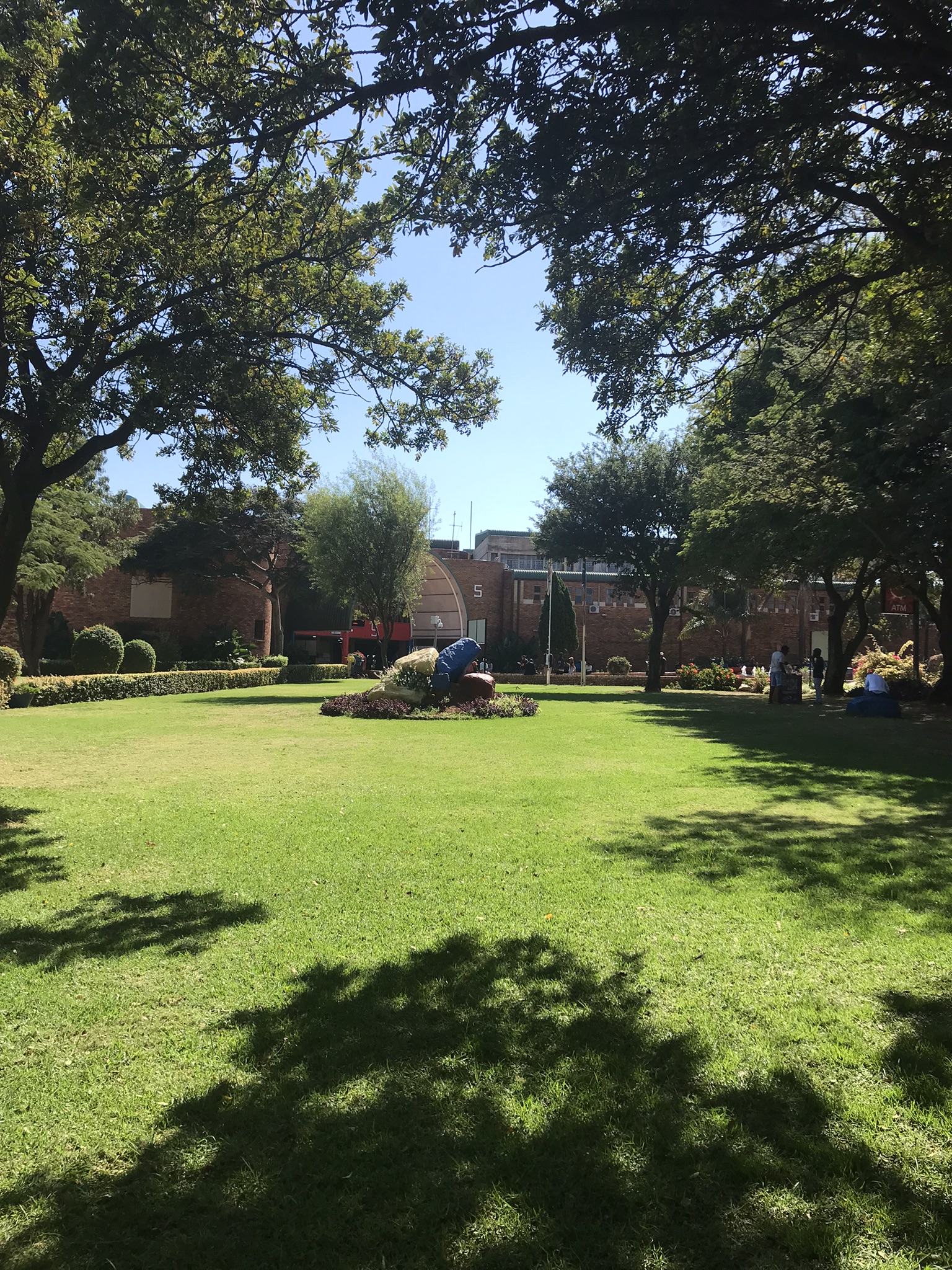
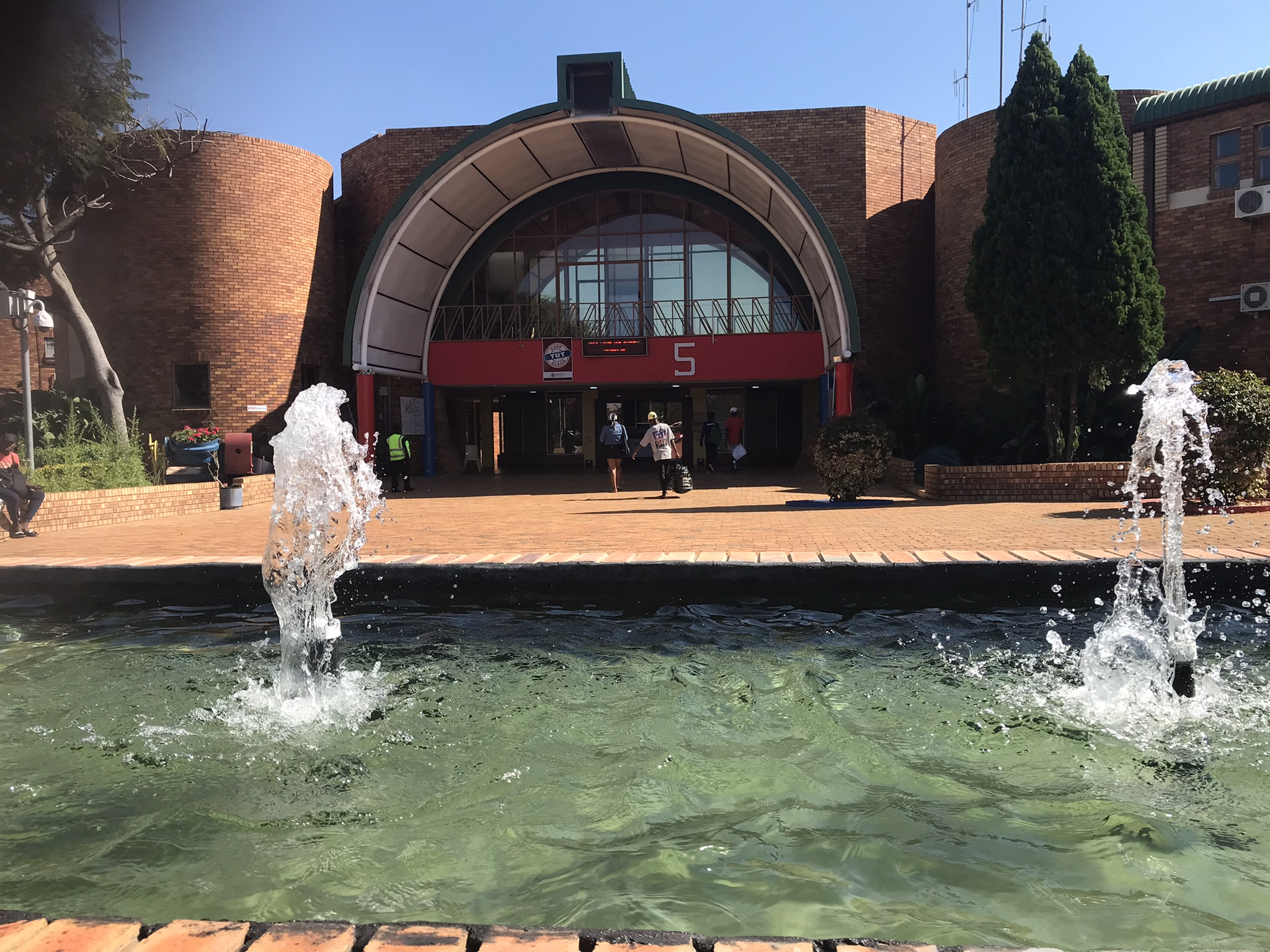
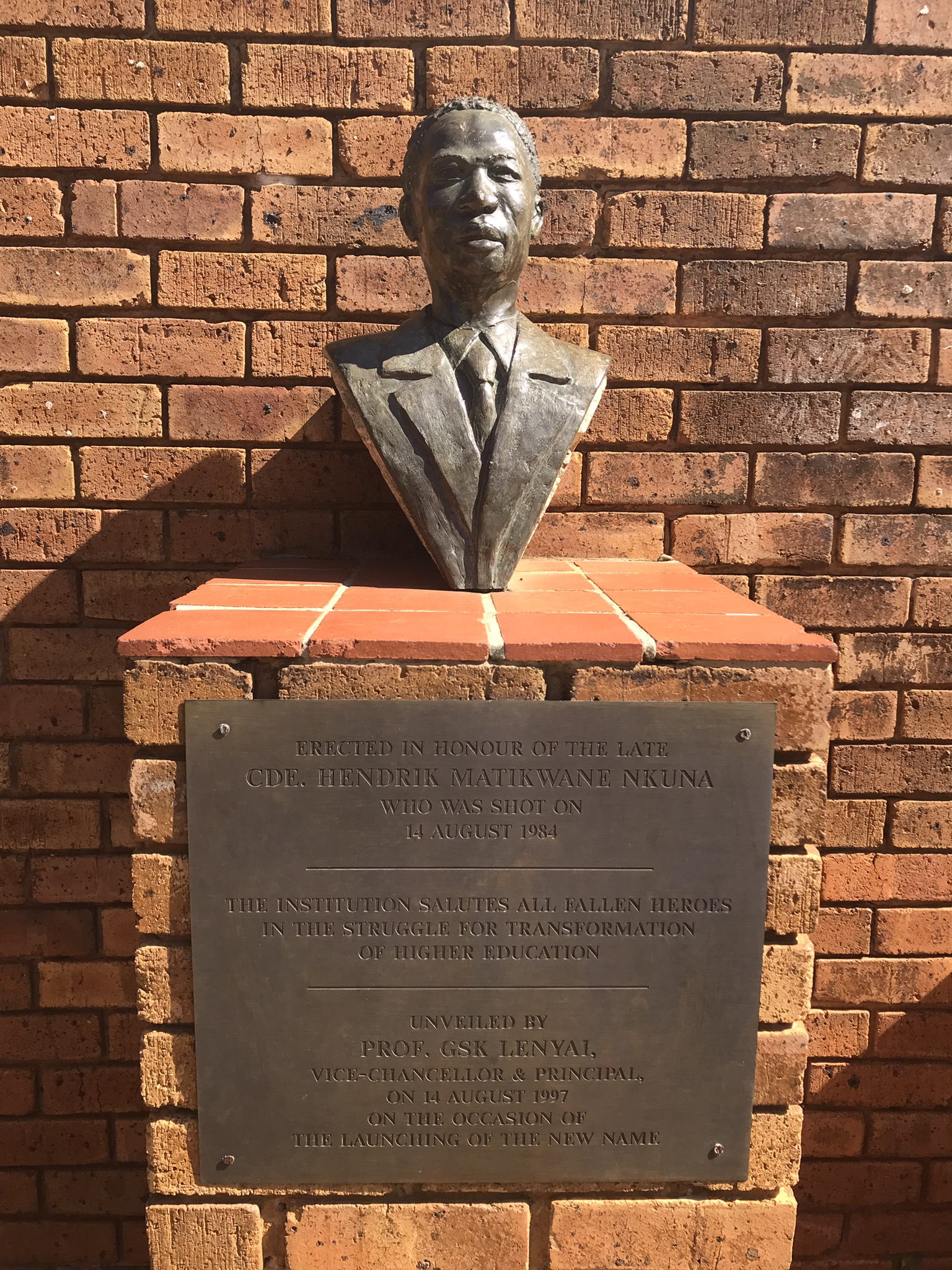
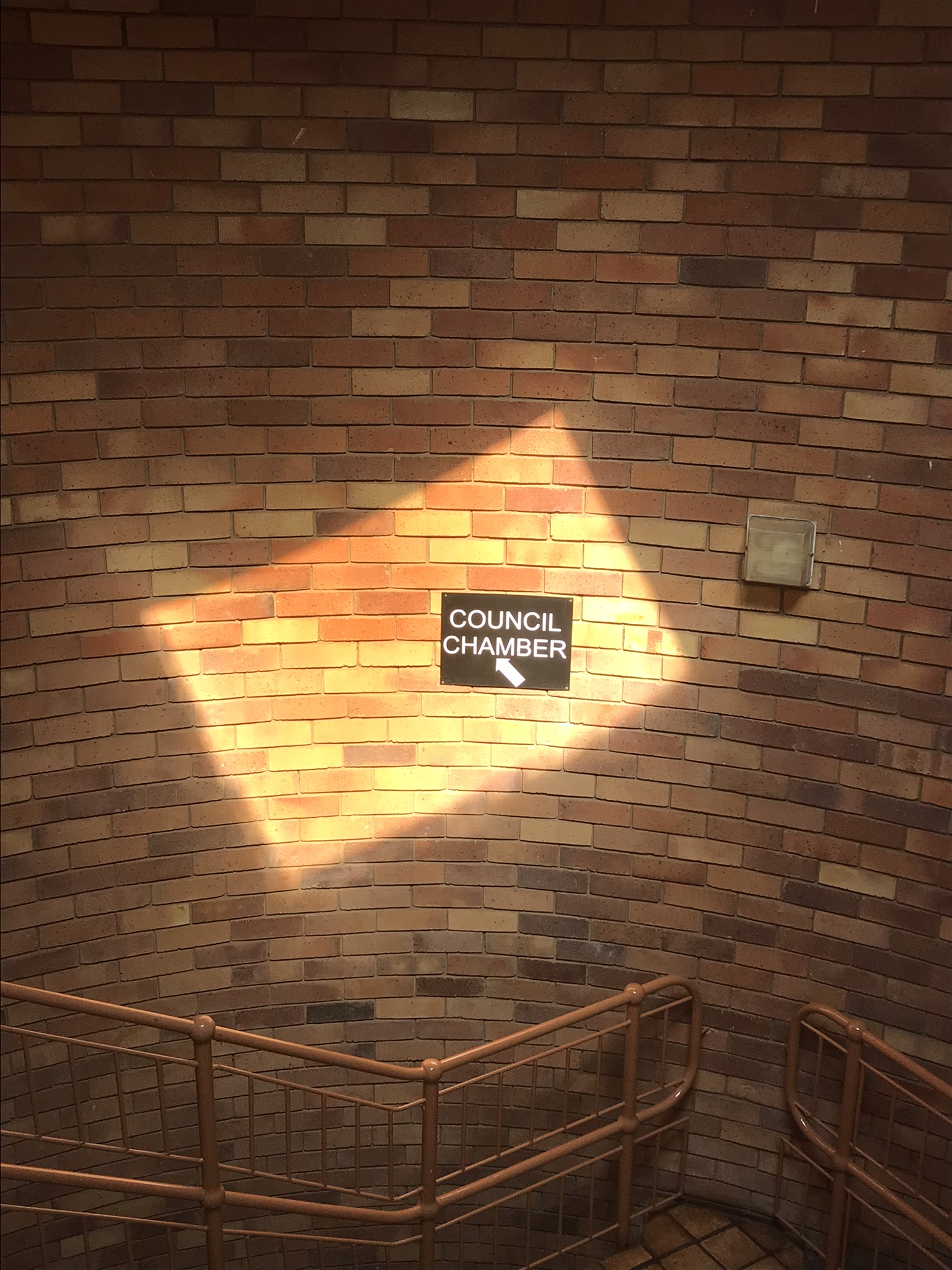
- Tshwane University of Technology - 15 years Aubrey Matlala Street Ruth First (previously Gencor) Hall TUT South Campus lawns Entrance to Council Chambers Hendrik Matikweni Nkuna Stairs leading up to Council Chambers
- Location: 25.54055°S 28.09530°E
- Tshwane University of Technology - Shoshanguve Campus (Q100943879) Tshwane University of Technology - Shoshanguve Campus (Q100943879)

Tshwane University of Technology (TUT) operates multiple campuses across South Africa, and the Soshanguve campus is divided into two main sites: Soshanguve South and Soshanguve North. Both are part of TUT's broader footprint in Pretoria and play an important role in serving students from the northern Tshwane area.

== Tshwane University of Technology - Soshanguve South Campus ==
The Soshanguve South Campus is one of the nine academic hubs at Tshwane University of Technology (TUT). South campus is located on Aubrey Matlala Street in Soshanguve, north of Pretoria with a focus on Information and Communication Technology (ICT) and Humanities. As part of South Africa's largest residential university, south campus plays a vital role in multilingual setting, providing quality higher education and expanding access to learning opportunities within the Gauteng province

=== Student leadership ===
Hendrik Makitini Nkuna was a student activist who was shot and killed by police during a 1984 protest for academic inclusion and democratic student representation. Soshanguve South Campus's statue, commemorates Nkuna's contribution to student struggle through memorial events and public lectures. This is intended to contribute to broader discussions about the history of South African student activism.

=== Tshwane University of Technology - Soshanguve North Campus ===
At the North campus, students can pursue qualifications and training aimed at professional careers in education, communication, and related fields. The campus supports learning through lecture halls, library facilities, and student support services typical of TUT sites

=== Alumni ===
Refer to Notable Alumni and add your section
