= Lesotho Women's Super League =

Highest division of league competition for Lesotho women's football

- Founded: 2014; 12 years ago
- Country: Lesotho
- Confederation: CAF
- Number of clubs: 10
- Level on pyramid: 1
- International cup(s): COSAFA Women's Champions League; CAF Women's Champions League
- Current champions: LDF Ladies (8th title) (2025–26)
- Most championships: LDF Ladies (8 titles)
- Website: www.lesothowsl.com

The Lesotho Women's Super League is the highest level of league competition for women's football in Lesotho. It is the women's equivalent of the men's Lesotho Premier League. Starting in 2021, the league champion will qualify for the COSAFA Women's Champions League.

== Champions ==
The list of champions and runners-up:

| Year | Champions | Runners-up |
|---|---|---|
| 2015 | LDF Ladies | Kick4Life |
| 2016 | Setoko | Kick4Life |
| 2017 | LDF Ladies | Kick4Life |
| 2018 | Kick4Life | LDF Ladies |
| 2018–19 | LDF Ladies | Setoko |
| 2019–20 | LDF Ladies | Kick4Life |
| 2021 | Kick4Life | LDF Ladies |
| 2022 | LDF Ladies | Kick4Life |
| 2022–23 | LDF Ladies | Kick4Life |
| 2023–24 | LDF Ladies | Kick4Life |
| 2024–25 | Kick4Life | LDF Ladies |
| 2025–26 | LDF Ladies | Kick4Life |
