= Lesotho Defence Force Ladies F.C. =

Lesotho Defence Force Ladies
- Full name: Lesotho Defence Force Ladies Football Club
- Stadium: Ratjomose Stadium
- Owner: Lesotho Defence Force
- Heach coach: (Lesotho) Nation Dube
- League: Lesotho Women's Super League
- 2025–26: 1st

Lesotho Defence Force Ladies Football Club, commonly known as LDF Ladies, is a women’s football club based in Maseru, Lesotho. The team is operated by the Lesotho Defence Force and competes in the Lesotho Women’s Super League, the top tier of women’s football in the country.

LDF Ladies are widely regarded as one of the most successful women’s teams in Lesotho, having won eight league titles and represented the nation in regional competitions.

== History ==
LDF Ladies were established as part of the Lesotho Defence Force’s sports programme, which includes football teams for both men and women. Over the years, the club has grown into a dominant force in women’s football, consistently finishing at the top of the Lesotho Women’s Super League.

The team’s rise coincided with increased investment in women’s football in Lesotho, as well as the introduction of regional competitions such as the COSAFA Women’s Champions League qualifiers, where LDF Ladies have participated as national representatives.

=== Continental Debut (2021) ===
LDF Ladies made their continental debut at the 2021 CAF Women's Champions League COSAFA Qualifiers after qualifying as champions of the 2019–20 Lesotho Women’s Super League. Drawn in Group A, they opened their campaign with a 6–0 defeat to Mamelodi Sundowns Ladies, followed by a 1–1 draw against Manzini Wanderers, which earned them their first point in the competition. They concluded the group stage with a 6–0 loss to Double Action Ladies, finishing with one point from three matches.

Their second appearance came in 2023, where they again finished the group stage with one point from three matches.

LDF Ladies starting XI against ZESCO Ndola Girls F.C. in the 2026 CAF Women's Champions League COSAFA Qualifiers in Gaborone, Botswana.

LDF Ladies returned for their third appearance in 2026, where they were drawn in the group stage and lost all three matches, ending the tournament without registering a point.

== Technical staff ==
Position	Name
Head coach	Nation Dube
Team manager	Fothoane Matlhokomelo
Physiotherapists	Anastacia Maqabane
Assistant coach	Angelinah Segole
Physical trainer	Machabe Letsatsi
Team doctor	Molahelhi Lehlohonolo
Goalkeeper coach	Moletsane Maieane
Safeguarding officer	Masasa Rebone

== Honours ==
- Lesotho Women's Super League: 2015, 2017, 2018–19, 2019–20, 2022, 2022–23, 2023–24,2025–26

== Club records ==
=== CAF Women's Champions League COSAFA qualifiers record ===
Season	Pos	Record						
Season	Pos	P	W	D	L	F	A	GD
2021	7th place	3	0	1	2	1	(13)	(12)
2023	5th place	3	0	1	2	2	(4)	(2)
2026	7th place	3	0	0	3	1	(4)	(3)

== See also ==
- Lesotho Women's Super League
- CAF Women's Champions League
- COSAFA Women's Champions League
