= Zimbabwean Women's League =

Highest division of league competition for Zimbabwe women's football

Zimbabwe Women's League
- Organising body: Zimbabwe Football Association
- Founded: 2011; 15 years ago
- Country: Zimbabwe
- Confederation: CAF
- Number of clubs: 14
- Level on pyramid: 1
- International cup: COSAFA Women's Champions League
- Current champions: Herentals Queens (3rd title) (2024)
- Most championships: Black Rhinos Queens (4 titles)

The Zimbabwean Women's League is the highest level of league competition for women's football in Zimbabwe. It is the women's equivalent of the men's Zimbabwe Premier Soccer League. Starting with the 2021, the league champion will qualify for the CAF Women's Champions League.

In August 2025, the Women's Super League received a three-month sponsorship from Utano.

== Champions ==
The list of champions and runners-up:

Year	Champions	Runners-up
2011	Black Rhinos Queens	
2012	Black Rhinos Queens	
2013	canceled	
2014	Flame Lily Queens	
2015	canceled	
2016	canceled	
2017	Correctional Queens	
2018	Black Rhinos Queens	
2019	Black Rhinos Queens	
2020	canceled	
2021	canceled	
2022	Herentals Queens	Black Rhinos Queens
2023	Herentals Queens	Black Rhinos Queens
2024	Herentals Queens	Black Rhinos Queens

== Top goalscorers ==
Season	Player	Team	Goals
2019	Emmaculate Msipa	Black Rhinos	24
2023	(Zimbabwe) Maudy Mafuruse	Herentals	32
2024	(Zimbabwe) Morelife Nyagumbo	Drive Academy	25
