= Herentals Queens =

- Logo of Herentals Queens F.C.
- Full name: Herentals Queens Football Club
- Owner: Innocent Benza
- Head Coach: (Zimbabwe) Lazarus Magaya Izimi
- League: Zimbabwean Women's League
- 1st

Herentals Queens F.C. is a women's football club representing Herentals Group of Colleges based in Harare, Zimbabwe. The team competes in the Zimbabwean Women's League, the top tier women's football league in Zimbabwe.

== History ==
The club won their maiden Zimbabwean Women's League title in 2022 and defended the title in 2023 ending the season undefeated. The team went on a 2 year (38 game) unbeaten streak before losing a Black Rhinos Queens 1-0 in July 2024.

The team could not represent Zimbabwe at the 2023 COSAFA Women's Champions League due to a Zimbabwe Football Association ban by FIFA.

=== COSAFA Women's Champions League ===
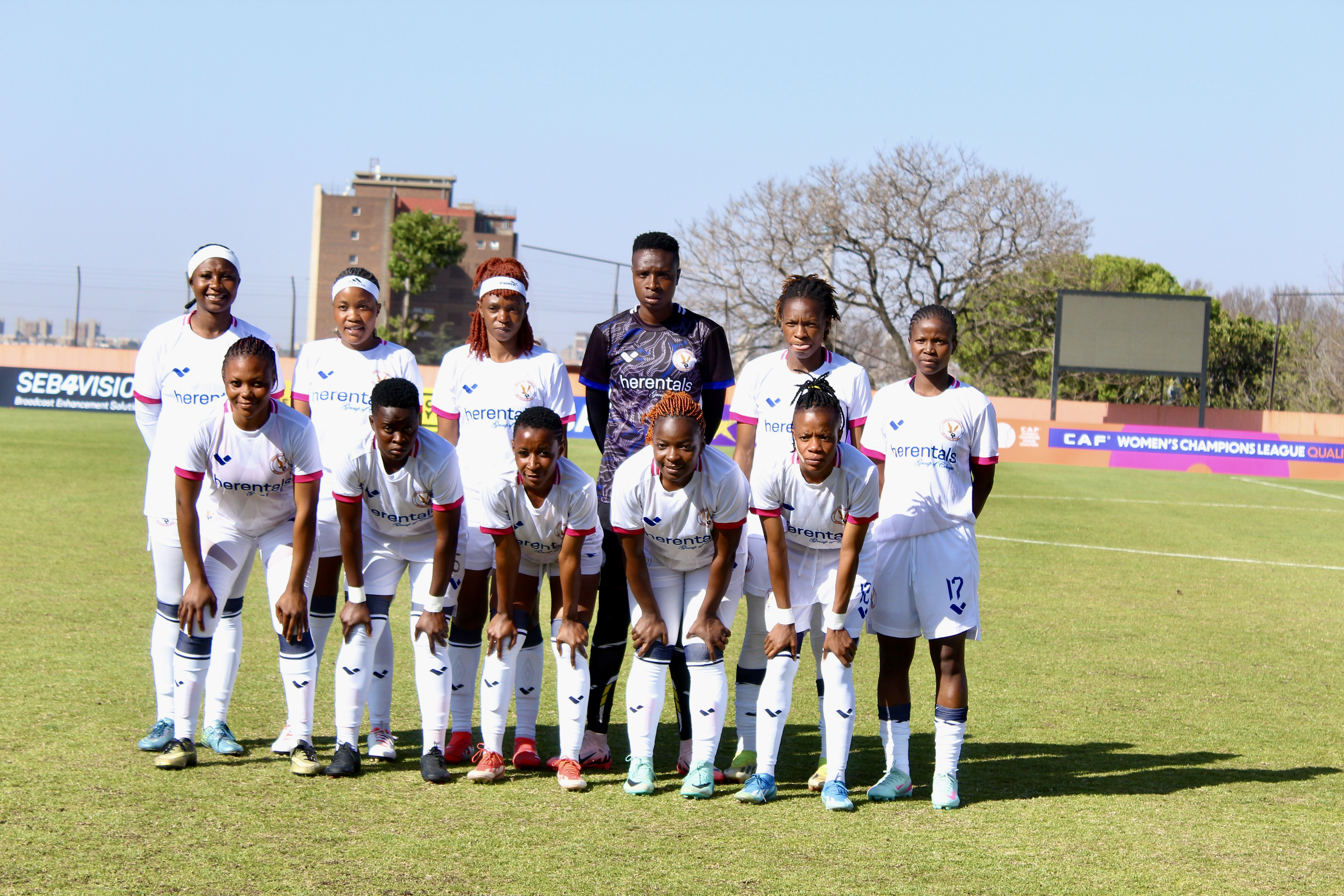
The Herental Queens XI at the 2025 CAF Women's Champions League COSAFA Qualifiers against Costa do Sol

The team made their COSAFA Women's Champions League debut with a 3–1 win over FC Ongos from Namibia. Their next match was a 1–0 win over Green Buffaloes from Zambia. They finished as runners-up in group A after a 2–1 to fellow students UWC Ladies from South Africa. They lost their semi-final match 1–0 against Gaborone United Ladies from Botswana.

They opened their 2025 COSAFA Women's Champions League with a 2–0 loss to CD Costa do Sol from Mozambique. They won their final group match 4–2 against Olympic de Moroni from Comoros to finish second in group C.

== Players ==
As of August 2025

Herental Queens F.C. squad for 2025 season.

Note: Flags indicate national team as defined under FIFA eligibility rules; some limited exceptions apply. Players may hold more than one non-FIFA nationality.

| No. | Pos. | Nation | Player |
|---|---|---|---|
| 1 | GK | ZIM | DOREEN SIBUSISIWE ZVAYI |
| 3 | DF | ZIM | PRAYNENCE EBLISTER ZVAWANDA |
| 4 | DF | ZIM | POLITE MABIKA |
| 5 | MF | ZIM | BETHEL KONDO |
| 6 | MF | ZIM | TABETH GAMUCHIRAI MUTINHIRI |
| 7 | MF | ZIM | MELANDA RUNGU |
| 8 | FW | ZIM | YEUKAI DIANA DIANA CHIPATIKO |
| 9 | FW | ZIM | GRACE KAZEMBE |
| 10 | FW | ZIM | MAUDY PAIDAMOYO MAFURUSE |
| 11 | FW | ZIM | MORELIFE NYAGUMBO |
| 12 | DF | ZIM | ALICE MOYO |
| 13 | DF | ZIM | RUJEKO NOCTAVIA KUNZE |

| No. | Pos. | Nation | Player |
|---|---|---|---|
| 15 | MF | ZIM | ELIZABETH BVUNZAWABAYA |
| 16 | FW | ZIM | MILLINDA CHIMBWANDA |
| 17 | MF | ZIM | LINDIWE MAGWEDE |
| 18 | DF | ZIM | SHYLINE DAMBAMURONO |
| 19 | FW | ZIM | SIKULEKILE NYONI |
| 20 | DF | ZIM | BRIDGET MUTAURWA |
| 21 | MF | ZIM | TUMBARE EGNESS |
| 22 | MF | ZIM | TALENT MUKWANDA |
| 23 | MF | ZIM | NYASHA MUNEMO |
| 24 | MF | ZIM | CYNTHIA SHONGA |
| 25 | DF | ZIM | POLITE ANNACRETTA DZUREMBA |
| 26 | GK | ZIM | CHRISTABEL ZULU |
| 27 | FW | ZIM | CATHRINE GWANGWARA |

== Honours ==
- Zimbabwean Women's League: 2022, 2023, 2024
