= Viola Namuddu =

Ugandan footballer

Personal information
- Date of birth: 8 April 1994 (age 32)
- Position: Midfielder

Team information
- Current team: Uganda Martyrs Lubaga Women Football Club

Senior career*
Years	Team	Apps	(Gls)
- Makerere University

International career^{‡}
2021–	Uganda	4	(0)
- * Club domestic league appearances and goals ‡ National team caps and goals as of 5 October 2021.

Viola Namuddu (born 8 April 1994) is a Ugandan footballer who plays as a midfielder for FUFA Women Super League club Makerere University and the Uganda women's national team.

== Club career ==
Namuddu has played for Makerere University in Uganda.

== International career ==
Namuddu capped for Uganda at senior level during the 2021 COSAFA Women's Championship.
