= Badru =

Badru is both a given name and a surname. Notable people with the name include:

- Badru Hafidh, Tanzanian football manager
- Badru Kateregga (born 1948), Ugandan academic
- Badru Kiggundu, Ugandan civil engineer
- Badru Lusambya (born 1982), Ugandan boxer
- Enitan Badru (born 1953), Nigerian politician
