= Janeth Shija =

Tanzanian footballer

Janeth Shija Simba
Personal information
- Full name: Stumai Abdallah Athumani
- Date of birth: 5 November 2003 (age 23)
- Position: Goalkeeper

Team information
- Current team: Simba Queens

Senior career*
Years	Team	Apps	(Gls)
- Simba Queens

International career^{‡}
2019–	Tanzania U20		
2021–	Tanzania	5+	(0)
- * Club domestic league appearances and goals ‡ National team caps and goals as of 12 July 2025

Janeth Shija Simba is a Tanzanian professional footballer who plays as a goalkeeper for Simba Queens and the Tanzania women's national team.

== International career ==
In 2019, Shija earned a call up to the Tanzania women's under-20 team for the inaugural 2019 COSAFA U-20 Women's Championship. At the end of the competition Tanzania emerged champions after defeating Zambia by 2–1 in the final. She was named in the 2021 COSAFA Women's Championship squad list. She started all five matches during the competition as Tanzania emerged champions for the first time in history.

== Honours ==
- COSAFA U-20 Women's Championship: 2019
- COSAFA Women's Championship: 2021
