= Dunasor =

Coordinates: 46°57′43″N 18°56′42″E

Dunasor is a district of Dunaújváros, Hungary. It is located between Városháza tér and the hospital. It is bordered by Streets Kossuth Lajos utca Vasmű, Kohász, Duna sor and Panoráma.

== Sources ==
- Dunaújvárosi Köztéri Szobrai, Várnai Gyula - Gyöngyössy Csaba, 1999, Ma Kiadó, ISBN 963 85423 7 3
- Dunapentele Sztálinváros, Dunaújváros Numizmatikai Emlékei 1950-2010, Asztalos Andrásné, ISBN 978-963-08-1300-6
