= Technikum (Dunaújváros) =

District in Hungary

Technikum is a district of Dunaújváros in Hungary. It is located between Táncsics Mihály and Dózsa György Streets.

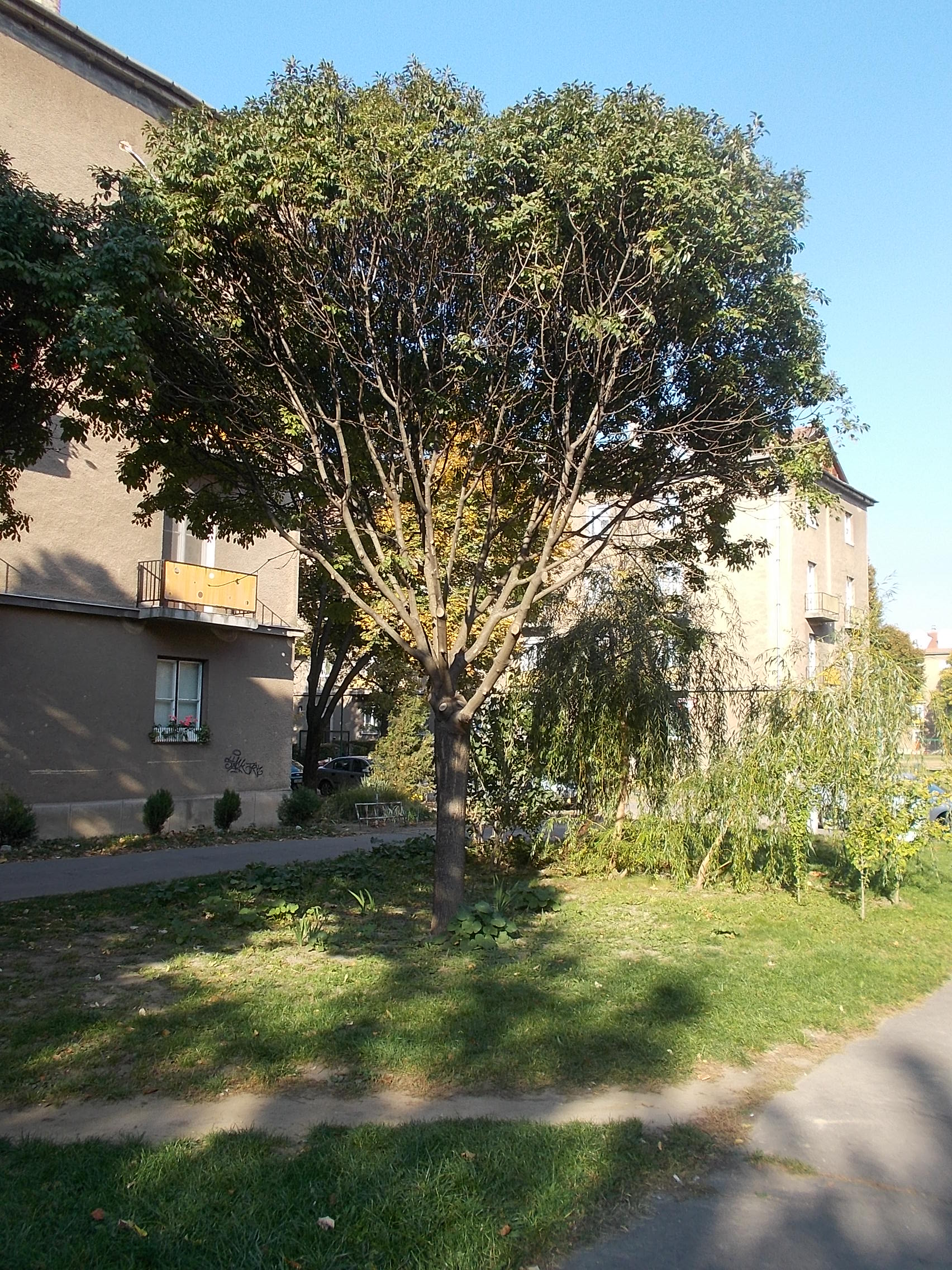
A tree in Technikum

Drinking water were ensured from Dunaföldvár and Budapest during the construction works. Decision about the construction is from November 1952. It has similar structure as Dunasor. Works were suspended in 1954, and the planned buildings with socreal facades were not built, because Khrushchev did not support this kind of art.

Family residential houses were built with gardens in front of them, and there were avant-corps and arcades on them. These were built with reinforced concrete, with a main wall at the centre from brick. There were numerous designers, for example József Malomsoky, Zoltán Czellecz, Ádám Solta, Ildikó Császár, Kálmán Mészáros, József Tiefenbeck, Tamás Szubi, Gábor Rombauer. József Malomsoky gained the rights to plan the western part of Dunaújváros with one of his plans from 1956.

Two schools were built, one with 16, and another one with 20 rooms.

Plans about the College of Dunaújváros’s predecessor are from 1952. The main idea was to make a technicum, a dormitory and a workshop, the latter being ready in 1956.

== Sources ==
- Dunaújvárosi Köztéri Szobrai, Várnai Gyula - Gyöngyössy Csaba, 1999, Ma Kiadó, ISBN 963 85423 7 3
- Dunapentele Sztálinváros, Dunaújváros Numizmatikai Emlékei 1950-2010, Asztalos Andrásné, ISBN 978-963-08-1300-6
