= Professional technical school =

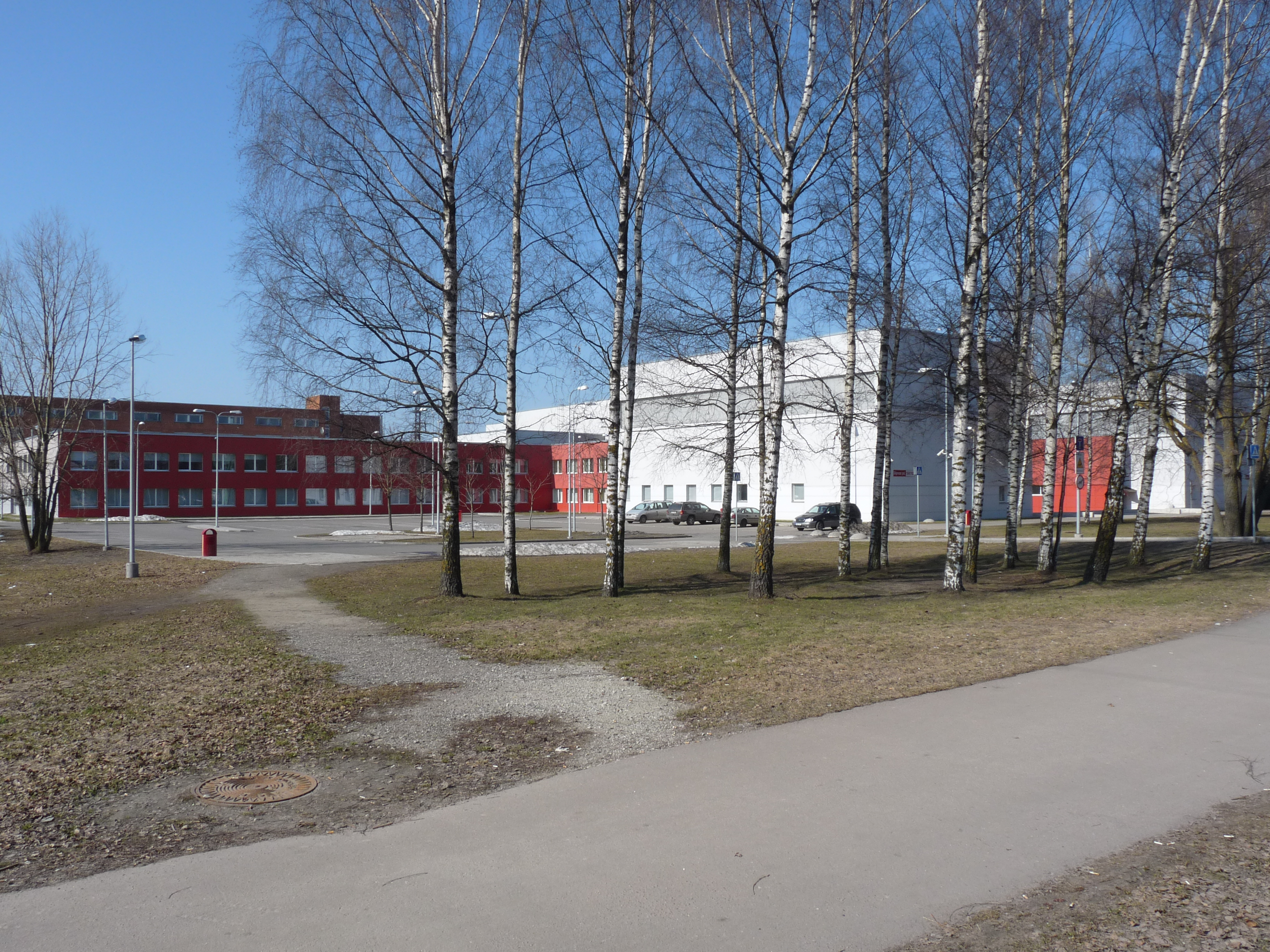
Vocation school in Tallinn, a carryover from Soviet times. Vocations available there include metalworker, welder, technician, barber, and tailor. A one-month electrician's certification is also available).

A professional technical school (Russian: профессиона́льно-техни́ческое учи́лище) – "professionalno-tehnicheskoye uchilishche" (acronym: PTU; ПТУ, пэ-тэ-у́) is a type of vocational education facility established in the former Soviet Union to train qualified industrial workers and servicemen. Such schools are widespread in post-Soviet countries (with one or more in most cities).

== Background ==
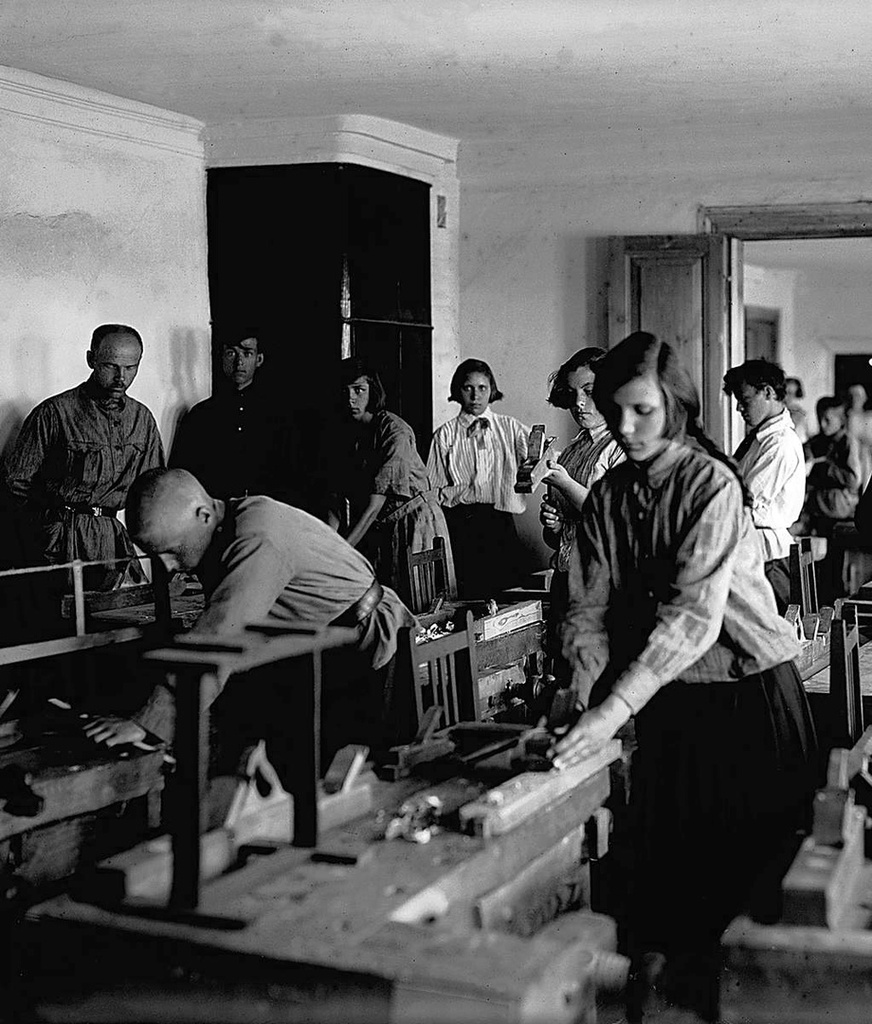
Carpentry workshop in school of factory and plant apprenticeship

By the reign of Nicholas II, a rudimentary and rather loose network of vocational institutions existed throughout the Russian Empire, drawing its support and funding from various sources including the state and industry and catering to students of varying levels of literacy and other preparation. A similar situation existed in areas that were not immediately absorbed into the USSR. The physical capital of these schools served as a kernel for subsequent Soviet institutions, a network expanded rapidly in concert with the industrialization drives of Soviet leaders.

In the 1920–1930s, the forerunners of PTU's included "schools of factory and plant apprenticeship"(Russian:"шко́ла фабри́чно-заводско́го учени́чества" – "Shkola fabrichno-zavodskogo uchenichestva", acronym: FZU; ФЗУ, фэ-зэ-у́), which were partly inherited from the vocational school system of the Russian Empire. In 1940, they were reorganized to "vocational schools" (Russian:"реме́сленное учи́лище" – "Remeslennoye uchilishche"), and in 1959 to PTUs.

PTUs, increasingly standardized through the 1960s, formed a government-funded USSR-wide system for school graduates who didn't intend to receive a university degree. Instead, they were both educated generally and trained for non-academic occupations. There were PTUs specializing in almost all such professions, but the most common were construction and machinery positions. Specializations also included electricians, secretaries (girls only), cooks, waiters and even mosaic artists (needed drawing talents to apply). The usual entering age for students was 15 – after 8 years of ordinary school, with students coming from peasant backgrounds, the lower working class, orphanages and the like. Two or three years of learning were typical, though some students would enter after 10 years of ordinary school and learn during 1 year.

PTUs sometimes required no entrance examination and provided students with free dormitories and meals. Parents were also attracted by the 24-hour presence of "upbringers" – mentors tasked with preventing students from engaging in deviant behavior. Further employment was also guaranteed, as well as the possibility of continuing education at university level. PTUs played an important role in urbanizing rural communities and forming the Soviet working class (see Urbanization).

== PTU's in the Post-Soviet Period ==
During the transformation to a market economy, Many PTUs were merged or some PTUs were renamed and reformed into "lyceums" in an attempt to gain higher status and establish tuition fees.

== See also ==
- Tekhnikum
- Rabfak
- Institute of technology
