= Technikum (Polish education) =

Type of specialized secondary school

Technikum is an institute of vocational education in Poland.

It is a mass-education institution of "special middle education" category 1 step higher than PTU, but aimed to train low and middle level (depending on profile) industrial managers, foremen, coordinators, technical supervisors etc. or specializing in occupations that require skills more advanced than purely manual labor, especially in high-tech occupations (such as electronics). After graduation from a technikum/college, a student may apply to an institution of higher learning (i.e. university) as a freshman.

== Poland ==
A student completing the 8th year of compulsory education (primary school) may choose from among three types of schools:

- liceum ogólnokształcące (high school, 4 years), designed mainly for those who want to pass the matura examinations and undertake a higher education;
- branżowa szkoła I stopnia (vocational school, 3 years), designed for those who want to start working immediately on completing their compulsory education;
- technikum (professional technical school, 5 years), after which students are qualified to work, with the possibility of taking the matura examinations and undertaking a higher education.

People who have completed a technikum and passed the final exams (organized by an external, state unit - Centralna Komisja Egzaminacyjna - Central Examination Board) in their profession obtain a title consisting of the word technik and the profession they have learnt (for example technik elektryk - electrical industry technician), where the word technician (technik) cannot be used by those who finished three-year vocational school. Their title contains only the name of profession, for example elektryk (electrician).

Examples (in alphabetical order):

- Technikum Budowlane: Vocational Technical High School for Construction
- Technikum Ceramiczne: Vocational Technical High School for Ceramics
- Technikum Chemiczne: Vocational Technical High School for Chemistry
- Technikum Drogowe Zespołu Szkół Budowlanych: Vocational Technical High School for Road Construction
- Technikum Drzewne: Vocational Technical High School for Woodworking
- Technikum Elektryczne: Vocational Technical High School for Electrical Science
- Technikum Energetyczne: Vocational Technical High School for Energetic Science
- Technikum Usług Fryzjerskich: Vocational Technical High School for Hairdressing
- Technikum Gastronomiczne: Secondary Technical School of Catering (Note: not a cooking school, per se)
- Technikum Handlowe: Vocational Trade High School for Retail
- Technikum Hodowlane: Vocational Technical High School for Agricultural Studies
- Technikum Hotelarskie: Vocational Technical High School for Hotel Administration
- Technikum Informatyczne: Vocational Technical High School for Computer Science
- Technikum Logistyczne: Vocational Technical High School for Logistics
- Technikum Łączności: Vocational Technical High School for Telecommunications
- Technikum Mechaniczne: Vocational Technical High School for Mechanical Studies
- Technikum Obsługi Turystycznej: Vocational School for Tourism and tourism-related enterprise
