= Tshwane University of Technology =

Multi-campus university in South Africa

- Motto: We empower people
- Type: Public university of technology
- Established: 1 January 2004 (Formed as a result of a merger of three established institutions)
- Affiliations: HESA; NADEOSA
- Chancellor: Gloria Tomatoe Serobe
- President: Banele Ntsele
- Vice-Chancellor: Tinyiko Samuel Maluleke
- Academic staff: c. 755
- Administrative staff: 4,800
- Students: c. 65,000
- Location: South Africa; 25.7322°S 28.1619°E
- Campus: nine campuses, mostly urban
- Colours: Blue, red, gold
- Nickname: TUT
- Website: www.tut.ac.za

Tshwane University of Technology (TUT; Afrikaans: Tshwane-Universiteit vir Tegnologie) is a higher education institution in South Africa that came into being through a merger of three technikons — Technikon Northern Gauteng, Technikon North-West and Technikon Pretoria.

As the number of students registering annually grows rapidly, records show that Tshwane University of Technology caters for approximately more than 60,000 students and it has become the largest residential higher education institution in South Africa.

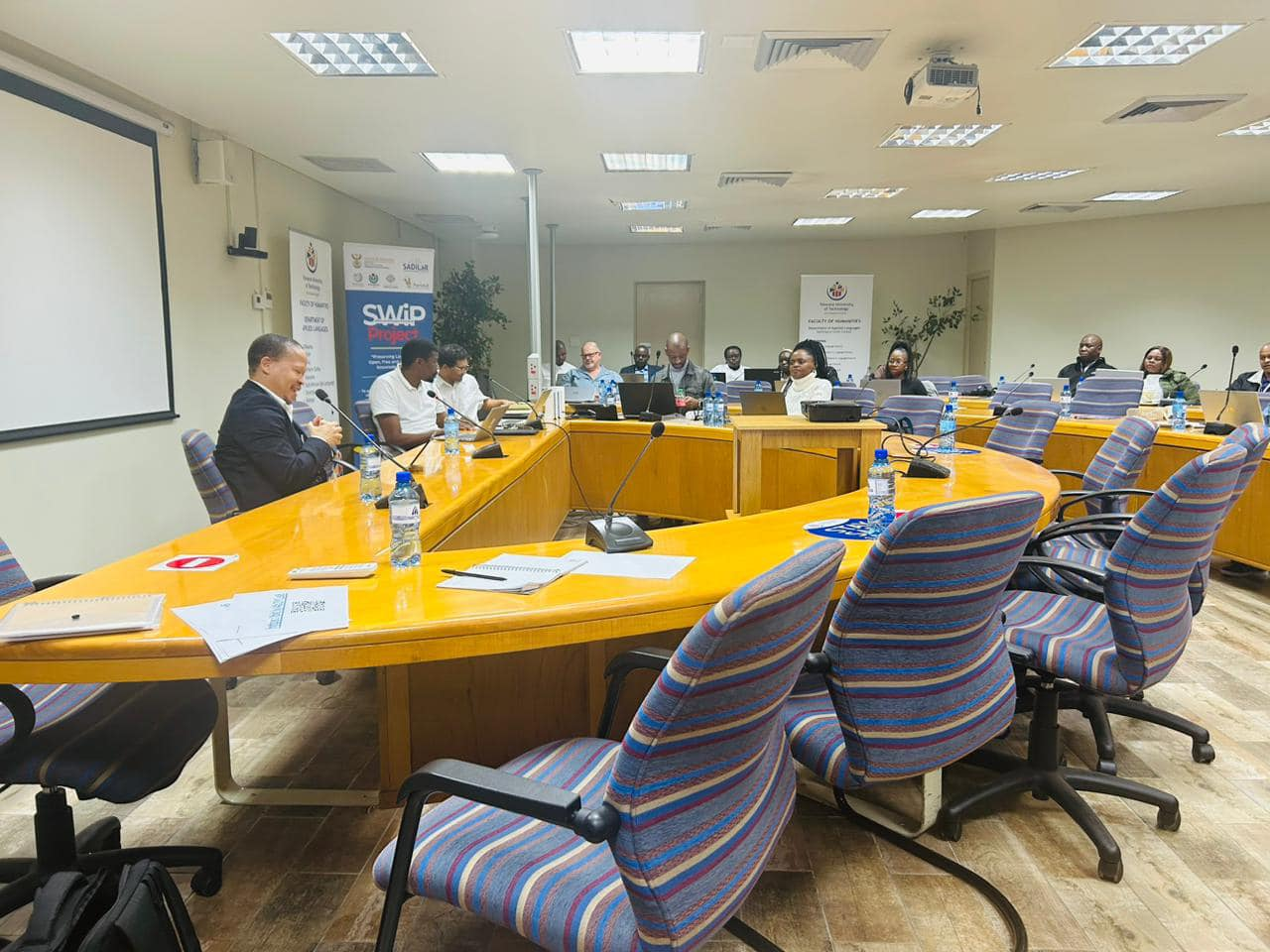
A Workshop At Tswane University Of Technology South Campus

== Campuses ==
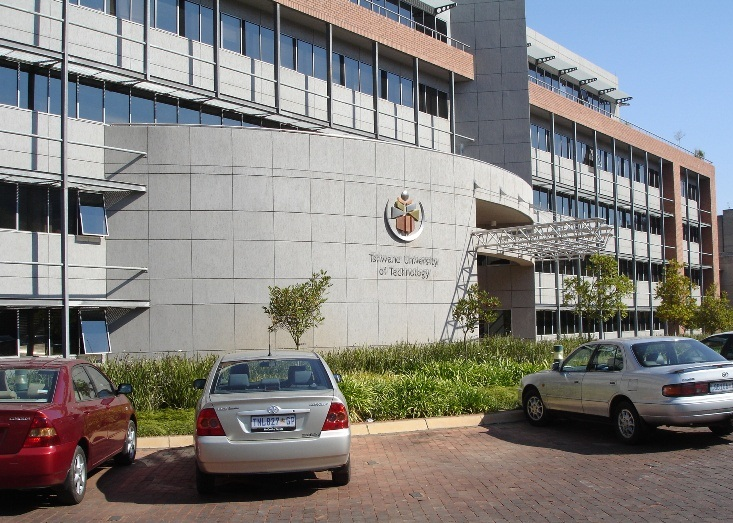
Tshwane University of Technology

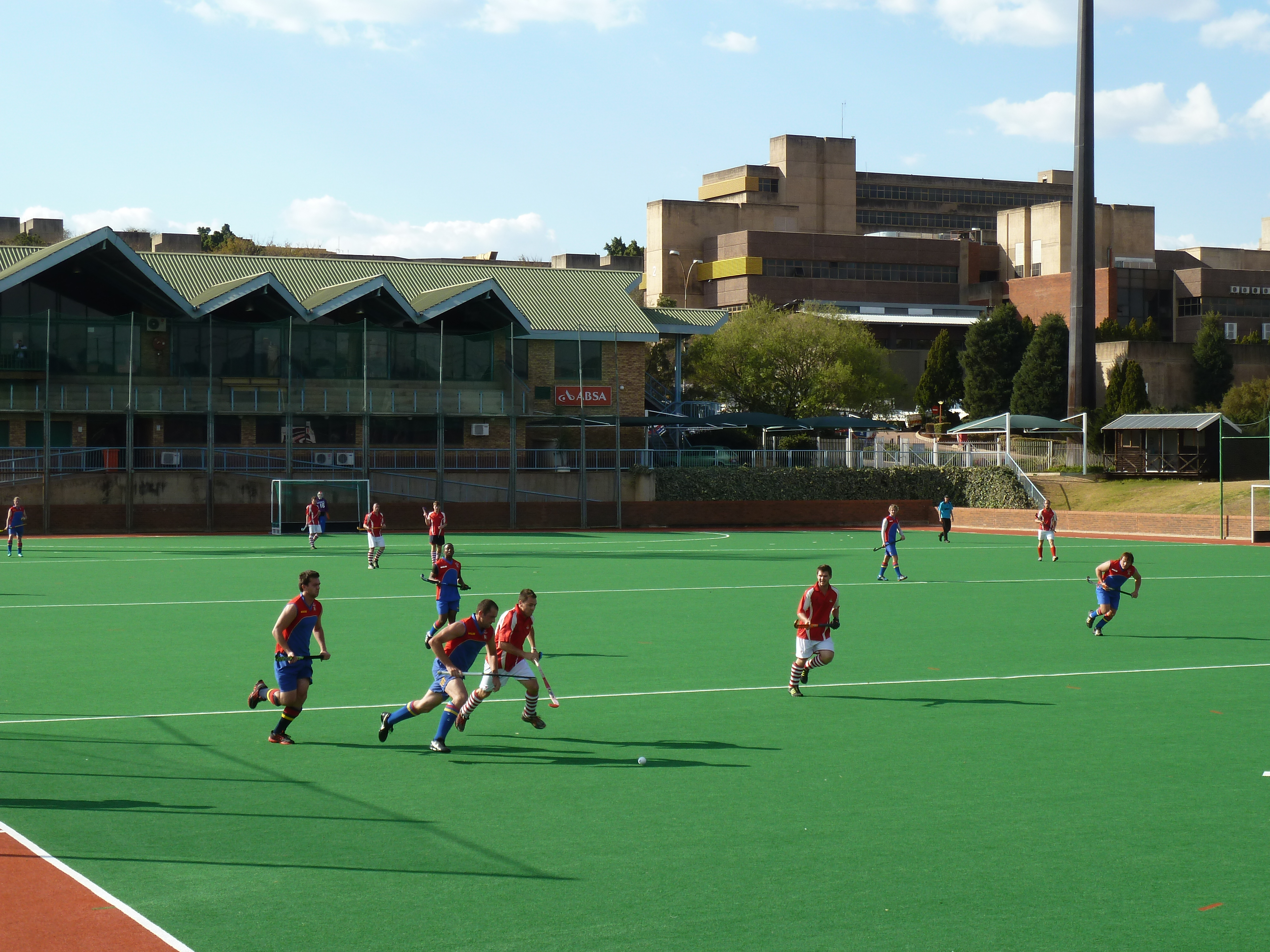
Hockey match at the Pretoria campus

The university occupies nine campuses: Pretoria main campus, arcadia campus, arts campus, Soshanguve south and Soshanguve north campus, Ga-Rankuwa campus, Witbank (eMalahleni campus), Mbombela (Nelspruit) and Polokwane. Two faculties, namely the Faculties of Science and The Arts, have dedicated campuses in the Pretoria city centre.

== Student enrollment ==
There were 88,078 students enrolled for the year 2012 at the Tshwane University of Technology. It was estimated, for the year 2014, that the number of first year student applications the university received were around 80,000. Tshwane University of Technology predominantly provides vocational qualifications in the form of three-year diplomas. Additional options exist in the form of advanced diplomas, postgraduate and masters and doctoral degrees. These qualifications are offered through the following faculties:

- Faculty of Arts and Design
- Faculty of Science
- Faculty of Engineering and the Built Environment
- Faculty of Information and Communication Technology (ICT)
- Faculty of Humanities
- Faculty of Economics and Finance
- Faculty of Management Sciences (including Business School)

== Ranking ==
In 2010 Webometrics ranked the university the 15th best in South Africa and 5662th in the world. In 2018, the university ranked ninth best university in South Africa.

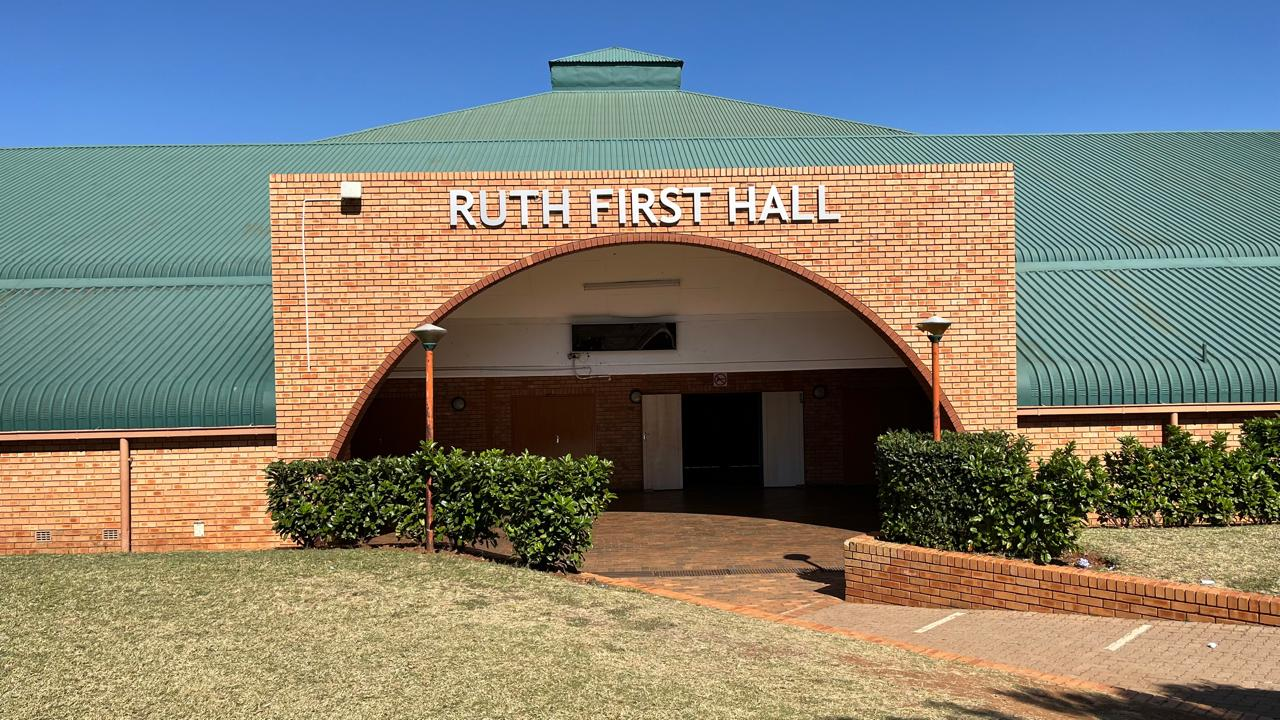
A hall found on TUT Soshanguve south campus

The United Nations Educational, Scientific and Cultural Organisation (UNESCO) ranks the university's Department of Journalism as one of twelve Potential Centres of Excellence in Journalism Training in Africa.

TUT Times Higher Education Ranking 2019 to 2024
Year	World Rank
2024	1201–1500
2023	-
2022	1001–1200
2021	1001+
2020	801–1000
2019	801–1000

== Electricity payment ==
In September 2025, TUT had its electricity cut for failing to pay an outstanding R 5.8 million electricity bill. The Mayor, Nasiphi Moya, had indicated that big institutions were not exempt from paying their bills, and this action was part of "Tshwane Ya Tima" revenue-collection campaign, where businesses and households that fail to pay their municipal bills face disconnections. The reconnection was done the same day as the university's management swiftly made payment arrangements with the Mayor. The ISRC President General made a public statement during the reconnection assuring students that such will not happen again.

== See also ==
- List of universities in South Africa
- List of post secondary institutions in South Africa
