= Black Rhinos Queens F.C. =

Black Rhino Queens
- Full name: Black Rhino Queens Football Club
- Head Coach: (Zimbabwe) Kuda Matuwi
- League: Zimbabwean Women's League
- 2024: 2nd

Black Rhino Queens F.C. is a women's football club based in Harare, Zimbabwe. The team competes in the Zimbabwean Women's League, the top tier women's football league in Zimbabwe.

== History ==
The club won the inaugural Zimbabwean Women's League in 2011. They won their fourth league title in 2019 and qualified for the 2021 COSAFA Women's Champions League.

=== COSAFA Women's Champions League ===
The team participated in the inaugural COSAFA Women's Champions League. Their first match was a 2–0 win against Zambia's Green Buffaloes. They booked their semi-final place with a 3–0 win against Namibia's Tura Magic Ladies. They won their semi-final 2–0 win against Botswana's Double Action and lost the final 3–0 to South Africa's Mamelodi Sundowns.

== Honours ==
- COSAFA Women's Champions League: Runners-Up: 2021
- Zimbabwean Women's League: 2011, 2012, 2018, 2019, Runners-Up: 2022, 2023, 2024
