= Lady Doves FC =

Ugandan women's association football club

Lady Doves FC is a Ugandan women's football club competing in the FUFA Women Super League. The club is based in Masindi city.

== History ==
Lady Doves FC made an official partnership with Uganda Premier League side Kitara FC. The partnership was made official after signing of a memorandum of understanding by Kitara FC president, Deo Kasozi and Nsingwire Godfrey, of Lady Doves FC.

Lady Doves FC won $10000 after they finished third with a bronze medal at the just inaugural CAF Women's Champions League Qualifiers that took place in the Kenyan capital, Nairobi.

In 2022, Lady Doves FC ended She Corporates unbeaten run by 5 goals to nil at Katusabe stadium in Masindi.

== Honours ==
Type	Competition	Titles	Winning Seasons	Runners-up
CAF	CAF Women's Champions League	Bronze	2021	1
